= 2013 Liga Indonesia Premier Division knock-out stage =

The knockout stage of 2013 Liga Indonesia Premier Division took place between September 8, 2013, and September 14, 2013, with the final at the Manahan Stadium in Surakarta, Central Java. The draw for the semi-finals took place on 2 September 2013 at the headquarters of the Football Association of Indonesia. To determine which teams who were to be promoted to the Indonesia Super League After the completion of the group stage on 30 August 2013, four teams qualified for the semi-finals (winner from each group and one best runner-up), which were played from 8 September 2013. The Champions, Runner-Up, and the 3rd Place finishers directly qualified to the 2014 Indonesia Super League with the 4th-place finisher qualified via Play-off with the 15th-place finisher of the 2013 Indonesia Super League.

== Qualified teams ==
Group	Winners	Runners-up
A	Persik	
B	Persebaya DU (Bhayangkara)	
C	Perseru	Persikabo

== Bracket ==
Semi-finals
8 September – Solo, Central Java
Persikabo	1
Persebaya DU (Bhayangkara)	4
8 September – Solo, Central Java
Persik	2 (4)
Perseru (p)	2 (5)

Final
14 September – Solo, Central Java
Persebaya DU (Bhayangkara)	2
Perseru	0
Third place
14 September – Solo, Central Java
Persikabo	2
Persik	6

== Semi-finals ==
=== Persikabo vs Persebaya DU (Bhayangkara) ===
8 September 2013
15:30 WIB

Persikabo	1 - 4	Persebaya DU (Bhayangkara) (P)
Tobar 90' (pen.)	Report	20', 54' Lopicic; 57', 80' (pen.) Boumsong

Manahan Stadium, Solo, Central Java
Attendance: 7,823

Persikabo	Persebaya DU (Bhayangkara)

PERSIKABO:4-3-3
GK	46	Agus Rohman
CB	3	Tugi Hadi (captain)
CB	19	(Moldova) Eduard Valuta
LB	5	Anwarudin
RB	23	Rodjali A.
CM	20	(Chile) Alejandro A. Tobar	(yellow card) 51'
CM	24	Septian A.
CM	34	Cucu Hidayat	(yellow card) 13'	(substituted off) 64'
LW	13	Aliyudin
RW	18	Handri		(substituted off) 72'
CF	90	(Brazil) Cristiano Lopes
Substitutions:
FW	9	Mustopa Aji		(substituted on) 64'
FW	6	Andi Sopian		(substituted on) 72'
Coach:
(Indonesia) Denny Syamsudin

Persebaya DU (Bhayangkara):4-2-3-1
GK	20	Bayu Cahyo Wibowo
CB	3	(Togo) Djaledjete Bedalbe	(yellow card) 31'
CB	6	Suroso
LB	18	Rasmoyo
RB	2	Imam Yulianto
DM	13	Asri Akbar
LM	29	Yanuarius Y. Kahol		(substituted off) 20'
CM	9	Uston Nawawi (captain)		(substituted off) 52'
RM	21	Ari Supriatna		(substituted off) 76'
AM	10	(Montenegro) Srdan Lopicic
ST	99	(Cameroon) Jean Paul Boumsong
Substitutions:
MF	7	Firmansyah Aprillianto		(substituted on) 20'
DF	23	Achmad Hisyam Tolle		(substituted on) 52'
DF	5	Zainal Abidin	(yellow card) 90'	(substituted on) 76'
Coach:
(Indonesia) Tony Ho

Man of the Match:
(Montenegro) Srdan Lopicic

Assistant referees:

Fourth official:

=== Persik vs Perseru ===
8 September 2013
19:00 WIB

Persik	2 - 2 (a.e.t.)	Perseru (P)
Ichya 30'; Dimas 53'	Report	55' Abdi; 60' Yoksan
Penalties
Kusnul Yuli (penalty scored); Yayan Andhy (penalty scored); Rendy Saputra (penalty scored); Tamsil (penalty scored); Fachtul Ichya (penalty missed)	4–5	(penalty scored) Liston Fonataba; (penalty scored) Michael Ditubun; (penalty scored) Marchelino Mandagi; (penalty scored) Abdi Gusti; (penalty scored) Yoksan Ama

Manahan Stadium, Solo, Central Java
Attendance: 4,321
Referee: Hamsir

Persik	Perseru

PERSIK:4-4-1-1
GK	91	Teddy Heri Setiawan
CB	25	(Cameroon) Mahamadou Al Hadji		(substituted off) 67'
CB	27	Tito Purnomo	(yellow card) 63'
LB	24	Mohammad Fachtul Ichya	(yellow card) 68'
RB	75	Kusnul Yuli (captain)
LM	13	Faris Aditama		(substituted off) 52'
CM	12	Harianto
CM	44	Tamsil	(yellow card) 6'
RM	16	Rendy Saputra
SS	11	(Liberia) Oliver Makor		(substituted off) 77'
ST	7	Dimas Galih Gumilang
Substitutions:
FW	6	Sigit Sudarmawan		(substituted on) 52'
DF	5	Sofyan Effendy		(substituted on) 67'
MF	17	Yayan Andhy	(yellow card) 98'	(substituted on) 77'
Coach:
(Indonesia) Aris Budi Sulistyo

PERSERU:3-5-2
GK	43	Yuwiwanto Stya Beni		(substituted off) 60'
CB	3	Onny Marthen Sibi	(yellow card) 39'
CB	5	Liston Harry Fonataba (captain)
CB	18	Bilibig Dian Mahrus
DM	45	Marchelino Mandagi
LM	16	Micheal Ditubun
RM	38	Tonny Roy Ayomi
AM	8	Abdi Gusti Wicahyono
AM	22	Arthur Barrios Bonai		(substituted off) 110'
ST	11	Yoksan Ama
ST	19	(Cameroon) Marc Orland Etogou
Substitutions:
GK	15	Teguh Amiruddin		(substituted on) 60'
MF	13	Franklin Rumbiak		(substituted on) 110'
Coach:
(Indonesia) Robby Maruanaya

Man of the Match:
Yoksan Ama

Assistant referees:

Fourth official:

== Third-placed ==
14 September 2013
15:30 WIB

Persikabo	2 - 6	Persik (P)
Al Hadji 45' (o.g.); Lopes 66' (pen.)	Report	6' Faris; 22', 45', 62' Makor; 80' Agus; 90' Kusnul Yuli

Manahan Stadium, Solo, Central Java
Attendance: 5,230

Persikabo	Persik

PERSIKABO:4-2-3-1
GK	46	Agus Rohman		(substituted off) 27'
CB	3	Tugi Hadi (captain)		(substituted off) 26'
CB	19	(Moldova) Eduard Valuta
LB	5	Anwarudin		(substituted off) 76'
RB	37	Masperi Kasim
DM	23	Rodjali A.
CM	24	Septian A.	(yellow card) 38'
LW	14	Bijahil Chalwa	(yellow card) 41' (yellow-red card) 90'
AM	20	(Chile) Alejandro A. Tobar
RW	9	Mustopa Aji	(yellow card) 60'
CF	90	(Brazil) Cristiano Lopes
Substitutions:
DF	2	Erick		(substituted on) 26'
GK	27	Abdulloh		(substituted on) 27'
FW	13	Aliyudin		(substituted on) 76'
Coach:
(Indonesia) Denny Syamsudin

PERSIK:4-4-1-1
GK	50	Wahyudi
CB	25	(Cameroon) Mahamadou Al Hadji	(yellow card) 8' (red card) 63'
CB	5	Sofyan Effendy		(substituted off) 58'
LB	24	Mohammad Fachtul Ichya		(substituted off) 53'
RB	75	Kusnul Yuli	(yellow card) 35'
LM	13	Faris Aditama		(substituted off) 83'
CM	12	Harianto (captain)
CM	44	Tamsil
RM	16	Rendy Saputra	(yellow card) 60'
SS	11	(Liberia) Oliver Makor
ST	7	Dimas Galih Gumilang
Substitutions:
MF	8	Agus Susanto		(substituted on) 53'
DF	27	Tito Purnomo	(yellow card) 73'	(substituted on) 58'
DF	26	Moch. Ansori		(substituted on) 83'
Coach:
(Indonesia) Aris Budi Sulistyo

Man of the Match:
Wahyudi

Assistant referees:

Fourth official:

== Final ==
14 September 2013
19:00 WIB

Persebaya DU (Bhayangkara)	2 - 0	Perseru
Boumsong 30', 57'	Report

Manahan Stadium, Solo, Central Java
Attendance: 11,236

Persebaya DU (Bhayangkara)	Perseru

Persebaya DU (Bhayangkara):4-1-3-2
GK	20	Bayu Cahyo Wibowo
CB	3	(Togo) Djaledjete Bedalbe
CB	6	Suroso
LB	18	Rasmoyo	(yellow card) 35'
RB	2	Imam Yulianto
DM	13	Asri Akbar
LM	21	Ari Supriatna		(substituted off) 82'
CM	9	Uston Nawawi (captain)		(substituted off) 71'
RM	10	(Montenegro) Srdan Lopicic
ST	25	Febri Setiadi Hamzah		(substituted off) 55'
ST	99	(Cameroon) Jean Paul Boumsong
Substitutions:
MF	7	Firmansyah Aprillianto		(substituted on) 55'
DF	23	Achmad Hisyam Tolle		(substituted on) 71'
MF	26	Ronny Firmansyah		(substituted on) 82'
Coach:
(Indonesia) Tony Ho

PERSERU:3-5-2
GK	15	Teguh Amiruddin
CB	25	Alex Wayoi	(yellow card) 90'
CB	5	Liston Harry Fonataba (captain)
CB	18	Bilibig Dian Mahrus
DM	45	Marchelino Mandagi
LM	22	Arthur Barrios Bonai
RM	38	Tonny Roy Ayomi
AM	8	Abdi Gusti Wicahyono	(yellow card) 30'	(substituted off) 76'
AM	13	Franklin Rumbiak		(substituted off) 64'
ST	10	Jefri Haay		(substituted off) 68'
ST	11	Yoksan Ama
Substitutions:
MF	16	Micheal Ditubun		(substituted on) 64'
MF	14	Luter Payawa		(substituted on) 68'
FW	26	Soleman Bayowa		(substituted on) 76'
Coach:
(Indonesia) Robby Maruanaya

Man of the Match:
(Cameroon) Jean Paul Boumsong

Assistant referees:

Fourth official:

== Promotion/relegation play-off ==
22 September 2013
15:30

Pelita Bandung Raya (O) (15th Super League)	2 – 1	Persikabo (4th Premier Division)
Gaston 7'; Dadić 34'	Report	51' Aji

Manahan Stadium, Solo, Central Java
Attendance: 2,052

Pelita Bandung Raya	Persikabo

PELITA BR:4-4-1-1
GK	12	Edi Kurnia
CB	20	(Croatia) Mijo Dadić (captain)
CB	29	Leonard Tupamahu	(yellow card) 61'
LB	42	Riyandi Ramadhana		(substituted off) 66'
RB	30	Nova Arianto
LM	10	(South Korea) Park Kyung-Min		(substituted off) 72'
CM	88	Rizky Pellu	(yellow card) 90'
CM	94	Imam Pathuroman	(yellow card) 39'
RM	16	Munadi
SS	78	(Syria) Marwan Sayedeh		(substituted off) 84'
ST	32	(Argentina) Gaston Castano
Substitutions:
DF	4	Mokhamad Syaifuddin		(substituted on) 66'
MF	7	Mochammad Solechudin		(substituted on) 72'
MF	58	(Montenegro) Miljan Radović		(substituted on) 84'
Coach:
(France) Darko Janacković

PERSIKABO:4-2-3-1
GK	46	Agus Rohman
CB	3	Tugi Hadi (captain)
CB	19	(Moldova) Eduard Valuta
LB	5	Anwarudin	(yellow card) 85'	(substituted off) 85'
RB	37	Masperi Kasim
DM	23	Rodjali A.
CM	34	Cucu Hidayat	(yellow card) 28'	(substituted off) 77'
LW	13	Aliyudin		(substituted off) 58'
AM	20	(Chile) Alejandro A. Tobar
RW	9	Mustopa Aji
CF	90	(Brazil) Cristiano Lopes
Substitutions:
FW	14	Bijahil Chalwa		(substituted on) 58'
FW	6	Andi Sopian		(substituted on) 77'
MF	11	Wawan Susilo		(substituted on) 85'
Coach:
(Indonesia) Denny Syamsudin

Man of the Match:

Assistant referees:

Fourth official:

Note: (O) = Play-off winner; (P) = Promoted to 2014 Indonesia Super League; (R) = Relegated to 2014 Liga Indonesia Premier Division.
