= 2013 Liga Indonesia Premier Division final =

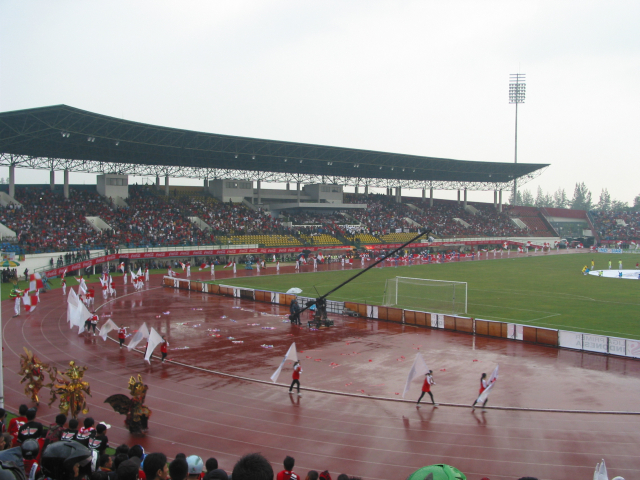
- Event: 2013 Liga Indonesia Premier Division
Persebaya DU (Bhayangkara)	Perseru Serui
(Indonesia)	(Indonesia)
2	0
- Details
- Date: 14 September 2013
- Venue: Manahan Stadium, Surakarta
- Premier Division Man of the Match: (Cameroon) Jean Paul Boumsong
- Referee: (Indonesia)
- Attendance: 11,236
- Weather: fine

The 2013 Liga Indonesia Premier Division final is a scheduled football match played on 14 September 2013 at the Manahan Stadium in Surakarta, Indonesia, to determine the winner of 2013 Liga Indonesia Premier Division. This round will bring together two of the best teams the East Java club Persebaya DU (Bhayangkara) with his opponent from Papua Perseru Serui. Persebaya DU (Bhayangkara) advanced to the finals after conquering Persikabo Bogor with a score of 4-1, while Perseru overcame Persik Kediri in a shootout with the final score ending 5-4 after extra time when normal and half ended with the score 2-2.

Persebaya DU (Bhayangkara) claim his first title in Premier Division after defeat Perseru Serui 2-0 in this Final.

== Route to the Final ==
Bhayangkara F.C.			Stages	Perseru Serui		
Main article: 2013 Liga Indonesia Premier Division (LI) § Group 3: Team / Pld / W / D / L / GF / GA / GD / Pts / Qualification; Persebaya DU (Bhayangkara) / 14 / 10 / 4 / 0 / 34 / 9 / +25 / 34 / Advanced to Second round; Perseba Super Bangkalan / 14 / 7 / 1 / 6 / 24 / 23 / +1 / 22 / Advanced to Second round; Perseta Tulungagung / 14 / 6 / 4 / 4 / 19 / 20 / −1 / 22 / Advanced to Second round; Deltras Sidoarjo / 14 / 6 / 3 / 5 / 22 / 16 / +6 / 21; PSBK Blitar / 14 / 6 / 3 / 5 / 19 / 15 / +4 / 21; Persekam Metro / 14 / 4 / 2 / 8 / 16 / 25 / −9 / 14; Persebo Bondowoso / 14 / 3 / 3 / 8 / 12 / 27 / −15 / 12; Persid Jember / 14 / 1 / 6 / 7 / 9 / 20 / −11 / 9; Updated to match(es) played on 11 June 2013. Source: 2013 Premier Division table Rules for classification: 1) points; 2) goal difference; 3) number of goals scored.			1st Round	Main article: 2013 Liga Indonesia Premier Division (LI) § Group 4: Team / Pld / W / D / L / GF / GA / GD / Pts / Qualification; Perseru / 14 / 11 / 2 / 1 / 22 / 6 / +16 / 35 / Advanced to Second round; PSBS / 14 / 7 / 3 / 4 / 24 / 16 / +8 / 24 / Advanced to Second round; Perseka Kaimana / 14 / 5 / 5 / 4 / 23 / 16 / +7 / 20; Persbul Buol / 14 / 5 / 4 / 5 / 25 / 19 / +6 / 19; Sumbawa Barat / 14 / 5 / 3 / 6 / 18 / 21 / −3 / 18; Persigo / 14 / 4 / 3 / 7 / 10 / 23 / −13 / 15; Perssin Sinjai / 14 / 4 / 2 / 8 / 16 / 26 / −10 / 14; Yahukimo / 14 / 3 / 2 / 9 / 12 / 23 / −11 / 11; Updated to match(es) played on 9 June 2013. Source: 2013 Premier Division table Rules for classification: 1) points; 2) goal difference; 3) number of goals scored.		
Main article: 2013 Liga Indonesia Premier Division (LI) second round § Group B: Team / Pld / W / D / L / GF / GA / GD / Pts; Persebaya DU (Bhayangkara) (A) / 6 / 3 / 3 / 0 / 9 / 5 / +4 / 12; PSBS Biak Numfor / 6 / 3 / 1 / 2 / 8 / 6 / +2 / 10; PS Bangka / 6 / 2 / 2 / 2 / 6 / 5 / +1 / 8; PSIS Semarang / 6 / 0 / 2 / 4 / 5 / 12 / −7 / 2; Source: (A) Advance to a further round			2nd Round	Main article: 2013 Liga Indonesia Premier Division (LI) second round § Group C: Team / Pld / W / D / L / GF / GA / GD / Pts; Perseru Serui (A) / 6 / 4 / 2 / 0 / 12 / 3 / +9 / 14; Persikabo Bogor (A) / 6 / 4 / 1 / 1 / 12 / 7 / +5 / 13; Mojokerto Putra / 6 / 1 / 1 / 4 / 9 / 13 / −4 / 4; Perseba Super / 6 / 1 / 0 / 5 / 8 / 18 / −10 / 3; Source: (A) Advance to a further round		
Opponent	Result	Legs	Knockout Stage	Opponent	Result	Legs
Persikabo	4 - 1	One-leg match	Semi-finals	Persik	2-2 (5-4; pso)	One-leg match

== Match ==
14 Sept 2013
19:00 WIB

Persebaya DU (Bhayangkara)	2 - 0	Perseru
Boumsong 30', 57'	Report

Manahan Stadium, Solo, Central Java
Attendance: 11,236

Persebaya DU (Bhayangkara)	Perseru

Persebaya DU (Bhayangkara):4-1-3-2
GK	20	Bayu Cahyo Wibowo
CB	3	(Togo) Djaledjete Bedalbe
CB	6	Suroso
LB	18	Rasmoyo	(yellow card) 35'
RB	2	Imam Yulianto
DM	13	Asri Akbar
LM	21	Ari Supriatna		(substituted off) 82'
CM	9	Uston Nawawi (captain)		(substituted off) 71'
RM	10	(Montenegro) Srdan Lopicic
ST	25	Febri Setiadi Hamzah		(substituted off) 55'
ST	99	(Cameroon) Jean Paul Boumsong
Substitutions:
MF	7	Firmansyah Aprillianto		(substituted on) 55'
DF	23	Achmad Hisyam Tolle		(substituted on) 71'
MF	26	Ronny Firmansyah		(substituted on) 82'
Coach:
(Indonesia) Tony Ho

PERSERU:3-5-2
GK	15	Teguh Amiruddin
CB	25	Alex Wayoi	(yellow card) 90'
CB	5	Liston Harry Fonataba (captain)
CB	18	Bilibig Dian Mahrus
DM	45	Marchelino Mandagi
LM	22	Arthur Barrios Bonai
RM	38	Tonny Roy Ayomi
AM	8	Abdi Gusti Wicahyono	(yellow card) 30'	(substituted off) 76'
AM	13	Franklin Rumbiak		(substituted off) 64'
ST	10	Jefri Haay		(substituted off) 68'
ST	11	Yoksan Ama
Substitutions:
MF	16	Micheal Ditubun		(substituted on) 64'
MF	14	Luter Payawa		(substituted on) 68'
FW	26	Soleman Bayowa		(substituted on) 76'
Coach:
(Indonesia) Robby Maruanaya

Man of the Match:
(Cameroon) Jean Paul Boumsong

Assistant referees:
??
??
Fourth official:
??

Match rules

- 90 minutes.
- 30 minutes of extra time if necessary.
- Penalty shoot-out if scores still level.
- Seven named substitutes, of which up to three may be used.
