= 2013 Liga Indonesia Premier Division second round =

The second stage of the 2013 Liga Indonesia Premier Division (LI) was played from 28 June to 30 August 2013. A total of twelve teams competed in the second stage.

== Draw ==
The draw for the group stage was held in June 2013, at the Liga Indonesia House in Jakarta, Indonesia. The 12 teams were drawn into three groups of four.

Group	Winners	Runners-up	3rd places
1	PS Bangka	Persisko Bangko	None
2	PSCS Cilacap	Persikabo Bogor	PSIS Semarang
3	Persebaya DU (Bhayangkara)	Perseba Super	Perseta Tulungagung
4	Perseru Serui	PSBS Biak Numfor	None
5	Persik Kediri	Mojokerto Putra	None

== Format ==
In the group stage, each group was played on a home-and-away round-robin basis. The winners of each group and one best runners-up advanced to the semi-finals.

=== Tiebreakers ===
The teams are ranked according to points (3 points for a win, 1 point for a tie, 0 points for a loss). If tied on points, tiebreakers are applied in the following order:

1. Greater number of points obtained in the group matches between the teams concerned
2. Goal difference resulting from the group matches between the teams concerned
3. Greater number of goals scored in the group matches between the teams concerned (away goals do not apply)
4. Goal difference in all the group matches
5. Greater number of goals scored in all the group matches
6. Kicks from the penalty mark if only two teams are involved and they are both on the field of play
7. Fewer score calculated according to the number of yellow and red cards received in the group matches (1 point for each yellow card, 3 points for each red card as a consequence of two yellow cards, 3 points for each direct red card, 4 points for each yellow card followed by a direct red card)
8. Drawing of lots

== Groups ==
The matchdays were 28 June, 3 July, 8 July, 19 August, 24/25 August, and 30 August 2013.

=== Group A ===
Team	Pld	W	D	L	GF	GA	GD	Pts
Persik Kediri (A)	6	5	0	1	16	5	+11	15
PSCS Cilacap	6	4	0	2	7	4	+3	12
Persisko Bangko	6	1	1	4	12	15	−3	4
Perseta Tulungagung	6	1	1	4	7	18	−11	4

(A) Advance to a further round
28 June 2013
19:00 UTC+07:00

Persik	4 - 0	Perseta
Al Hadji 13'; Faris 40'; Makor 55', 91'; Machia (yellow card) 58'; Qischil (yellow card) 73'	Report	(yellow card) 54' Ferdiansyah

Brawijaya Stadium, Kediri
Attendance: 14,456
Referee: Bahrul Ulum
28 June 2013
15:30 UTC+07:00

PSCS	2 - 0	Persisko
Rastiawan 25'; Andri 42'	Report	(yellow card) 86' Otot

Wijayakusuma Stadium, Cilacap
Attendance: 8,125
Referee: Sapari

3 July 2013
15:15 UTC+07:00

Perseta	1 - 0	PSCS
Hugo 43'; Arista (yellow card) 91'	Report	(yellow card) 31' Bienvenue; (yellow card) 66' Eric

Rejoagung Stadium, Tulungagung
Attendance: 7,550
Referee: Wendy Umar Senoaji
3 July 2013
15:30 UTC+07:00

Persisko	3 - 4	Persik
Rifai 47', 90'; Amsar 51'; Mursalim (yellow card) 64'	Report	12', 65' Makor; 16' Agus; 76' Al Hadji; (yellow card) 88' Kusnul Yuli

Karya Bhakti Stadium, Tanjabar
Attendance: 1,500
Referee: Masril

8 July 2013
15:30 UTC+07:00

Persisko	2 - 2	Perseta
Otot 45'; Alejandro 60'	Report	(yellow card) 9' Sudarsono; 25', 39' Hugo

Karya Bhakti Stadium, Tanjabar
Attendance: 1,500
Referee: Fahrizal M. Kahar
8 July 2013
15:30 UTC+07:00

PSCS	1 - 0	Persik
Wahyu 32'	Report	(red card) 30' Khusnul Yuli; (yellow card) 78' Machia

Wijayakusuma Stadium, Cilacap
Attendance: 9,825
Referee: Hipni

19 August 2013
15:30 UTC+07:00

Perseta	1 - 5	Persik
Arista 43'	Report	6', 63' Dimas; 9', 20', 46' Makor

Pandan Arang Stadium, Boyolali
Attendance: 1,225
Referee: Hariyanto
19 August 2013
15:00 UTC+07:00

Persisko	1 - 3	PSCS
Alejandro 60'	Report	4', 8' Bienvenue; 66' Taryono

Madya Stadium, Magelang
Referee: Fahrizal M. Kahar

24 August 2013
15:30 UTC+07:00

PSCS	1 - 0	Perseta
Taryono 29'; Eric (yellow card) 38'; Rastiawan (yellow card) 83'	Report	(yellow card) 37' Harmoko; (yellow card) 85' Nkomo

Wijayakusuma Stadium, Cilacap
Attendance: 8,965
24 August 2013
15:30 UTC+07:00

Persik	1 - 0	Persisko
Dimas 49'; Irvan (yellow card) 54'; Faris (yellow card) 87'	Report	(yellow card) 81' Otot; (yellow card) 89' Rahmat

Pandan Arang Stadium, Boyolali
Attendance: 1,000

30 August 2013
15:30 UTC+07:00

Perseta	3 - 6	Persisko
Ferdi (yellow card) 16'; Dede 23', 42'; Agus (yellow card) 86'; Andi 88'	Report	6', 47', 61' Alejandro; (yellow card) 21' Teguh; 49', 78' Amsar; 85' Otot

Taruna Stadium, Sragen
Attendance: 1,000
30 August 2013
15:00 UTC+07:00

Persik	2 - 0	PSCS
Dimas 5'; Makor 31'; Faris (yellow card) 39'; Fachtul (yellow card) 42'	Report	(yellow card) 57' Abong

Manahan Stadium, Surakarta
Attendance: 3,267

=== Group B ===
Team	Pld	W	D	L	GF	GA	GD	Pts
Persebaya DU (Bhayangkara) (A)	6	3	3	0	9	5	+4	12
PSBS Biak Numfor	6	3	1	2	8	6	+2	10
PS Bangka	6	2	2	2	6	5	+1	8
PSIS Semarang	6	0	2	4	5	12	−7	2

(A) Advance to a further round
28 June 2013
15:30 UTC+07:00

Persebaya DU (Bhayangkara)	1 - 0	PSBS
Boumsong 54'; Imam (yellow card) 62'; Zainal (yellow card) 82'	Report	(yellow card) 18' Msen; (yellow card) 32' Lucky

Gelora Bung Tomo Stadium, Surabaya
Attendance: 1,140
Referee: Moh. Sholeh
28 June 2013
15:30 UTC+07:00

Bangka	2 - 1	PSIS
Husen 41'; Nanang 81'	Report	Sukarja 39'; (yellow card) 11' Edy Gunawan; (yellow card) 42' Morris

Ir. Sutiyono (Orom) Stadium, Bangka
Attendance: 5,375
Referee: Hipni

3 July 2013
15:15 UTC+09:00

PSBS	1 - 0	Bangka
Yarangga (yellow card) 48'; Alex 68' (pen.)	Report	(yellow card) 62' Rafael

Cendrawasih Stadium, Biak
Attendance: 3,000
Referee: Joni Parera
3 July 2013
15:30 UTC+07:00

PSIS	2 - 2	Persebaya DU (Bhayangkara)
Addison 32', 75'; M. Irfan (yellow card) 81'; Morris (yellow card) 88'; Addison (yellow card) 89'	Report	31' Djaledjete; (yellow card) 41' Rony; (yellow card) 65' Lopicic; (yellow card) 91' Febri; 91' Lopicic

Jatidiri Stadium, Semarang
Attendance: 25,000
Referee: Hamsir

8 July 2013
15:15 UTC+07:00

Persebaya DU (Bhayangkara)	2 - 1	Bangka
Lopicic 20'; Boumsong 55' (pen.); Boumsong (yellow card) 79'; Akbar Rasyid (yellow card) 84'	Report	16' Nanang; (yellow card) 44' Nagbe; (yellow card) 67' Novrianto

Gelora 10 November Stadium, Surabaya
Attendance: 2,000
Referee: Jusman R.
8 July 2013
15:15 UTC+09:00

PSBS	3 - 1	PSIS
Defli 29'; Toumahuw 55'; Michael (yellow card) 69'; Varney 72'; Varney (yellow card) 77'	Report	(yellow card) 20' Fajri; 40' Addison

Cendrawasih Stadium, Biak
Attendance: 3,500
Referee: Ahmad Tuharea

19 August 2013
15:15 UTC+09:00

PSBS	1 - 1	Persebaya DU (Bhayangkara)
Defli (yellow card) 11'; Varney 27'; Korwa (yellow card) 29'	Report	61' (yellow card) 62' Boumsong

Cendrawasih Stadium, Biak
Attendance: 5,000
Referee: Jusman R.
19 August 2013
15:30 UTC+07:00

PSIS	0 - 0	Bangka
Ringga (yellow card) 20'; Fajri (yellow card) 65'	Report	(yellow card) 45' Marcel; (yellow card) 67' Suheri

Jatidiri Stadium, Semarang
Attendance: 18,000
Referee: Sapari

24 August 2013
15:30 UTC+07:00

Bangka	2 - 0	PSBS
Rafael 38' (pen.); Marcel 46' (pen.) (yellow card) 46'; Suheri (yellow card) 48'; Royasman (yellow card) 85'	Report	(yellow card) 31' Patrias

Ir. Sutiyono (Orom) Stadium, Bangka
Attendance: 5,375
25 August 2013
15:30 UTC+07:00

Persebaya DU (Bhayangkara)	2 - 0	PSIS
Djaledjete 1'; Febri 40'; Zainal (yellow card) 60'; Lopicic (yellow card) 85'	Report	(yellow card) 34' Addison; (yellow card) 56' Yulian

Kobangdikal Bumi Moro Stadium, Surabaya
Attendance: 2,789

30 August 2013
15:30 UTC+07:00

Bangka	1 - 1	Persebaya DU (Bhayangkara)
Nagbe (yellow card) 45'; Rafael 65' (pen.)	Report	41' Tolle; (yellow card) 45' Thomas; (yellow card) 52' Tolle

Ir. Sutiyono (Orom) Stadium, Bangka
Attendance: 5,375
30 August 2013
15:30 UTC+07:00

PSIS	1 - 3	PSBS
Iksan (yellow card) 29'; Fagundez 77'	Report	(yellow card) 16' Lois; 29' Yarangga; (yellow card) 66' Obinaru; (yellow card) 71' Varney; 83' Goerge; 85' Toumahuw

Jatidiri Stadium, Semarang
Attendance: 15,000

=== Group C ===
Team	Pld	W	D	L	GF	GA	GD	Pts
Perseru Serui (A)	6	4	2	0	12	3	+9	14
Persikabo Bogor (A)	6	4	1	1	12	7	+5	13
Mojokerto Putra	6	1	1	4	9	13	−4	4
Perseba Super	6	1	0	5	8	18	−10	3

(A) Advance to a further round
28 June 2013
15:15 UTC+09:00

Perseru	2 - 0	Perseba
Abdi Gusti 21'; Etogou 29'; Arthur (yellow card) 38'; Etogou (yellow card) 71'	Report	(yellow card) 24' Ferry; (yellow card) 53' Heri; (yellow card) 61' Hariyanto; (yellow card) 80' Kodari

Marora Stadium, Yapen Islands
Attendance: 2,500
Referee: Ahmad Tuharea
28 June 2013
15:30 UTC+07:00

Persikabo	3 - 1	Mojokerto Putra
Lipede 8' (o.g.); Valuta 14'; Aliyudin 57'	Report	(yellow card) 24' Asman; (yellow card) 35' Wahyu; 88' Bationo

Persikabo Stadium, Bogor
Attendance: 5,251
Referee: Fahrizal M. Kahar

3 July 2013
15:00 UTC+07:00

Perseba	2 - 3	Persikabo
Victor 29' (pen.), 49' (pen.); Mujib (yellow card) 90'	Report	11' Tobar; 43' Aji; (yellow card) 57' Lopes; (yellow card) 78' Cuhi; (yellow card) 85' Tugi Hadi; 93' (o.g.) Camli; (yellow card) 94' Aliyudin

Gelora Bangkalan Stadium, Bangkalan
Attendance: 5,210
Referee: Fahri Albar
3 July 2013
15:30 UTC+09:00

Mojokerto Putra	1 - 1	Perseru
Supaham 50'	Report	34' Etogou; (yellow card) 52' Onny; (yellow card) 60' Yoksan

Gajahmada Mojosari Stadium, Mojokerto
Attendance: 4,653
Referee: Suyanto

8 July 2013
15:15 UTC+09:00

Perseba	4 - 2	Mojokerto Putra
Fandhy 4', 85'; Danilo 30' (pen.), 57' (pen.)	Report	18', 86' Bationo; (yellow card) 24' Fafa; (yellow card) 29' Lipede

Gelora Bangkalan Stadium, Bangkalan
Attendance: 7,107
Referee: Bahrul Ulum
8 July 2013
15:15 UTC+07:00

Perseru	3 - 2	Persikabo
Etogou 7'; Yoksan 25'; Arthur 48'; Onny (yellow card) 85'	Report	20' Lopes; 28' Aji; (yellow card) 44' Cuhi; (yellow card) 83' Septian A.

Marora Stadium, Yapen Islands
Attendance: 3,000
Referee: Hariyanto

19 August 2013
15:30 UTC+09:00

Perseba	0 - 3	Perseru
Mujib (yellow card) 49'	Report	22', 23', 50' Etogou

Kobangdikal Bumi Moro Stadium, Surabaya
Attendance: 1,200
Referee: Choiruddin
19 August 2013
15:30 UTC+07:00

Mojokerto Putra	0 - 1	Persikabo
Ma'ruf (yellow card) 39'	Report	40' (pen.) Lopes; (yellow card) 84' Chalwa

Arhanud Stadium, Sidoarjo
Attendance: 0
Referee: Suyanto

24 August 2013
15:00 UTC+09:00

Perseru	3 - 0 (w.o.)	Mojokerto Putra
	Report

Marora Stadium, Yapen Islands
Attendance: 1,000
24 August 2013
15:30 UTC+07:00

Persikabo	3 - 1	Perseba
Lopes 59' (pen.), 67' (pen.), 82'	Report	85' Fandhy

Persikabo Stadium, Bogor
Attendance: 4,235

30 August 2013
15:30 UTC+07:00

Persikabo	0 - 0	Perseru
	Report	(yellow card) 28' Etogou; (yellow card) 68' Beni; (yellow card) 90' Wayoi

Persikabo Stadium, Bogor
Attendance: 8,735
30 August 2013
15:30 UTC+07:00

Mojokerto Putra	5 - 1	Perseba
Supaham 11'; Pradibtya 20'; Agung 41'; Asman 58'; Ragil 65'	Report	87' Hariyanto

Kobangdikal Bumi Moro Stadium, Surabaya
Attendance: 45
