= 2013 Persebaya Surabaya (DU) season =

Persebaya Surabaya (DU)
2013 season
- Owner: PT. Mitra Muda Inti Berlian
- President: Diar Kusuma Putra; Bambang Pramukantoro
- Headcoach: Miroslav Janu; Tony Ho
- Stadium: Gelora Bung Tomo Stadium, Surabaya
- Premier Division: Champions
- Top goalscorer: Jean-Paul Boumsong (18)
- Biggest win: Persebo Bondowoso 0-5 Persebaya Surabaya (DU)
- Biggest defeat: season unbeaten

The 2013 season was Persebaya Surabaya (DU) 3rd season in the club's football history, the 3rd consecutive season in the second-tier Liga Indonesia season and the 3rd season competing in the Liga Indonesia Premier Division since their existence in 2010 after the acquisition of league slots and membership from Persikubar West Kutai. In the 2013 season, Persebaya DU won the championship after defeating Perseru Serui in the Final round at Manahan Stadium. Persebaya DU was the unbeaten team throughout the competition.

== Squad ==
Note: Flags indicate national team as defined under FIFA eligibility rules; some limited exceptions apply. Players may hold more than one non-FIFA nationality.

No.	Pos.	Nation	Player
1	GK	(Indonesia) IDN	Thomas Ryan Bayu
2	DF	(Indonesia) IDN	Imam Yulianto
3	DF	(Togo) TOG	Djaledjete Bedalbe
5	DF	(Indonesia) IDN	Zainal Abidin (c)
6	MF	(Indonesia) IDN	Suroso
7	FW	(Indonesia) IDN	Firmansyah Aprillianto
9	MF	(Indonesia) IDN	Uston Nawawi
10	FW	(Montenegro) MNE	Srđan Lopičić
11	FW	(Indonesia) IDN	Basuki
12	MF	(Indonesia) IDN	Wahyu Subo Seto
13	MF	(Indonesia) IDN	Akbar Rasyid
18	MF	(Indonesia) IDN	Rasmoyo
20	GK	(Indonesia) IDN	Bayu Cahyo Wibowo

No.	Pos.	Nation	Player
21	DF	(Indonesia) IDN	Ari Supriyatna
23	DF	(Indonesia) IDN	Achmad Tolle
25	FW	(Indonesia) IDN	Febri Setiadi Hamzah
26	MF	(Indonesia) IDN	Ronny Firmansyah
29	DF	(Indonesia) IDN	Yanuarius Y Kahol
99	FW	(Cameroon) CMR	Jean-Paul Boumsong
—	GK	(Indonesia) IDN	Roni Tri Prasnanto
—	FW	(Indonesia) IDN	Reza Aditya
—	DF	(Indonesia) IDN	Ade Iwan Setiawan
—	DF	(Indonesia) IDN	Iqbal Samad
—	DF	(Indonesia) IDN	Saddam Hi Tenang
—	FW	(Indonesia) IDN	Fany Setyo Jatmiko
—	FW	(Indonesia) IDN	Gherry Setya
—	DF	(Indonesia) IDN	Angga Pratama
—	DF	(Indonesia) IDN	Muhammad Hamzah
—	FW		Martin Pougue
—	DF	(Brazil) BRA	Gesio Carvalho
—	MF	(Croatia) CRO	Vedran Muratović
—	MF	(Indonesia) IDN	Zainal Anwar

== Match Results ==
=== First round ===
Group 3

Pos	Team	Pld	W	D	L	GF	GA	GD	Pts	Qualification
1	Persebaya DU (Bhayangkara)	14	10	4	0	34	9	+25	34	Advanced to Second round
2	Perseba Super Bangkalan	14	7	1	6	24	23	+1	22	Advanced to Second round
3	Perseta Tulungagung	14	6	4	4	19	20	−1	22	Advanced to Second round
4	Deltras Sidoarjo	14	6	3	5	22	16	+6	21	
5	PSBK Blitar	14	6	3	5	19	15	+4	21	
6	Persekam Metro	14	4	2	8	16	25	−9	14	
7	Persebo Bondowoso	14	3	3	8	12	27	−15	12	
8	Persid Jember	14	1	6	7	9	20	−11	9	
9	Persipas Paser (Note: Due to the difficulty of funding is a problem that can not be overcome by the club, then Persipas Paser officially declared bankrupt and withdrew from participation in the league after serving a three match.)	0	0	0	0	0	0	0	0	Clubs expelled, records expunged

Updated to match(es) played on 11 June 2013. Source: 2013 Premier Division table
Rules for classification: 1) points; 2) goal difference; 3) number of goals scored.

=== Second round ===
Group B

Pos	Team	Pld	W	D	L	GF	GA	GD	Pts	Qualification	BHA	PSBS	BGK	PSIS
1	Persebaya DU (Bhayangkara)	6	3	3	0	9	5	+4	12	Advance to knockout stage		1–0	2–1	2–0
2	PSBS Biak Numfor	6	3	1	2	8	6	+2	10		1–1		1–0	3–1
3	PS Bangka	6	2	2	2	6	5	+1	8		1–1	2–0		2–1
4	PSIS Semarang	6	0	2	4	5	12	−7	2		2–2	1–3	0–0	

=== Knockout Stage ===
Semifinal

8 September 2013
15:30 WIB

Persikabo	1 - 4	Persebaya DU (Bhayangkara) (P)
Tobar 90' (pen.)	Report	20', 54' Lopicic; 57', 80' (pen.) Boumsong

Manahan Stadium, Solo, Central Java
Attendance: 7,823

Final

14 September 2013
19:00 WIB

Persebaya DU (Bhayangkara)	2 - 0	Perseru
Boumsong 30', 57'	Report

Manahan Stadium, Solo, Central Java
Attendance: 11,236
