= 2013 Liga Indonesia Premier Division =

Liga Indonesia Premier Division
- Season: 2013
- Champions: Persebaya DU (Bhayangkara)
- Promoted: Persebaya DU (Bhayangkara); Perseru Serui; Persik Kediri
- Matches: 296
- Goals: 807 (2.73 per match)
- Top goalscorer: J.P. Boumsong; Oliver Makor (18 goals)
- Biggest home win: PS Bangka 11–0 PS Bengkulu (26 May 2013)
- Biggest away win: Persebo 0–5 Persebaya DU (Bhayangkara) (2 April 2013); PPSM 0–5 Mojokerto Putra (11 May 2013)
- Highest scoring: PS Bangka 11–0 PS Bengkulu (26 May 2013)
- Longest winning run: Perseru Serui (8 matches)
- Longest unbeaten run: Persebaya DU (Bhayangkara) (22 matches)
- Longest winless run: PPSM Magelang (12 matches)
- Longest losing run: PS Bengkulu (4 matches)
- Highest attendance: 22,000; PSIS 1–0 PSCS (27 January 2013)
- Lowest attendance: 0 Mojokerto Putra 0–1 Persikabo (19 August 2013)
- Total attendance: 131,037
- Average attendance: 6,240

The 2013 Liga Indonesia Premier Division season is the eighteenth edition of Liga Indonesia Premier Division since its establishment in 1994. The competition is managed by PT. Liga Indonesia (LI).

This season is the second season of Liga Indonesia Premier Division organised by PT.Liga Indonesia without authorisation from PSSI as it has decided to appoint the new PT. Liga Prima Indonesia Sportindo (LPIS) to organise the competition. It is then recognised by PSSI breakaway leadership under La Nyalla Matalitti.

The participant initially consists of 37 clubs, Included the four clubs that played last season at DU PT LPIS, PSIS Semarang, PSCS Cilacap, Persikabo Bogor and Persbul Buol, later added to 42 clubs, after 5 clubs, (Persipasi Bekasi, Persik Kediri, PS Madiun Putra, Persewangi Banyuwangi, and PPSM Sakti Magelang) come back from competition that held by PT. LPIS, and divided into five groups. The fixtures were released on 23 January 2013. The season kicked off on 27 January 2013 and the group stage is scheduled to conclude on 23 Juny 2013.

On 1 February 2013, PT. Liga Indonesia received resignation PSGL Gayo Lues due to lack of sponsors to support their progress in the competition this season.

On 6 February 2013, PT. Liga Indonesia disqualified PSAB Aceh Besar and Persipasi Bekasi due to administrative reason.

== Teams ==
Group 1	Group 2	Group 3	Group 4	Group 5
PSAP Sigli	Persitara Jakarta Utara	Persebaya DU (Bhayangkara)	PSKSB Sumbawa Barat	Persis Solo
PSMS Medan	Persikad Depok	Deltras Sidoarjo	Persigo Gorontalo	PSIM Yogyakarta
Persih Tembilahan	Persikabo Bogor	PSBK Blitar	Perssin Sinjai	PS Mojokerto Putra
PS Bangka	Persip Pekalongan	Persekam Metro	PSBS Biak Numfor	Persewangi Banyuwangi
Persisko Bangko	Persitema Temanggung	Persid Jember	Perseru Serui	Persik Kediri
PS Bengkulu	PSIS Semarang	Persebo Bondowoso	Perseka Kaimana	Madiun Putra
	Persiku Kudus	Perseba Bangkalan	Yahukimo	PPSM Sakti Magelang
	Persipur Purwodadi	Persipas Paser	Persbul Buol	
	PSCS Cilacap	Perseta Tulungagung		

=== Stadium and locations ===
Locations of 2013 Liga Indonesia Premier Division (LI) teams

Team	Regency or City	Province	Stadium	Capacity	2011–12 season
Deltras Sidoarjo	Sidoarjo	East Java	Gelora Delta	35,000	17th 2011–12 Super League
Madiun Putra	Madiun	East Java	Wilis	10,000	join LPIS competition
Mojokerto Putra	Mojokerto	East Java	Gajahmada	10,000	11th in Group 2 2011–12 Premier Division
Persbul Buol	Buol	Central Sulawesi	Kuonoto	10,000	join LPIS competition
Persebaya DU (Bhayangkara)	Surabaya	East Java	Gelora 10 November	30,000	Top 8 2011–12 Premier Division
Perseba Super Bangkalan	Bangkalan	East Java	Gelora Bangkalan	10,000	Top 12 2012 First Division
Persebo Bondowoso	Bondowoso	East Java	R. Soedarsono	10,000	Semifinal 2012 First Division
Perseka Kaimana	Kaimana	West Papua	Triton	8,000	Champion of 2012 First Division
Persekam Metro	Malang Regency	East Java	Kanjuruhan	30,000	7th in Group 2 2011–12 Premier Division
Perseru Serui	Yapen Islands Regency	Papua	Marora	10,000	6th in Group 2 2011–12 Premier Division
Perseta Tulungagung	Tulungagung Regency	East Java	Rejoagung	7,000	Top 12 2012 First Division
Persewangi Banyuwangi	Banyuwangi	East Java	Diponegoro	10,000	join LPIS competition
Persid Jember	Jember	East Java	Notohadinegoro	10,000	8th in Group 2 2011–12 Premier Division
Persigo Gorontalo	Gorontalo	Gorontalo	Merdeka	10,000	7th in Group 2 2011–12 Premier Division
Persih Tembilahan	Indragiri Hilir	Riau	Beringin	5,000	8th in Group 1 2011–12 Premier Division
Persik Kediri	Kediri	East Java	Brawijaya	12,000	join LPIS competition
Persikabo Bogor	Bogor Regency	West Java	Persikabo	15,000	join LPIS competition
Persikad Depok	Depok	West Java	Merpati	1,000	Top 12 2012 First Division
Persiku Kudus	Kudus	Central Java	Wergu Wetan	10,000	Top 8 2011–12 Premier Division
Persip Pekalongan	Pekalongan	Central Java	Gelora Bumi Batik	25,000	6th in Group 1 2011–12 Premier Division
Persipas Paser	Paser Regency	East Kalimantan	Sadurangas	3,000	Top 12 2012 First Division
Persipur Purwodadi	Purwodadi	Central Java	Krida Bakti	15,000	Semifinal 2012 First Division
Persis Solo	Surakarta	Central Java	Manahan	35,000	7th in Group 1 2011–12 Premier Division
Persisko Bangko	West Tanjung Jabung Regency	Jambi	Persitaj	3,000	Top 12 2012 First Division
Persitara Jakarta Utara	North Jakarta	Jakarta	Tugu	10,000	5th in Group 1 2011–12 Premier Division
Persitema Temanggung	Temanggung Regency	Central Java	Bhumi Phala	15,000	9th in Group 1 2011–12 Premier Division
Perssin Sinjai	Sinjai Regency	South Sulawesi	Andi Bintang	15,000	10th in Group 2 2011–12 Premier Division
PPSM Sakti Magelang	Magelang	Central Java	Abu Bakrin	10,000	join LPIS competition
PSAP Sigli	Pidie Regency	Aceh	Kuta Asan	15,000	18th 2011–12 Super League
PS Bangka	Bangka Regency	Bangka-Belitung	Orom	3,000	Runner-up 2012 First Division
PS Bengkulu	Bengkulu	Bengkulu	Semarak	15,000	10th in Group 1 2011–12 Premier Division
PSBK Blitar	Blitar	East Java	Gelora Supriyadi	15,000	Top 8 2011–12 Premier Division
PSBS Biak Numfor	Biak Numfor	Papua	Cendrawasih	30,000	5th in Group 2 2011–12 Premier Division
PSCS Cilacap	Cilacap	Central Java	Wijayakusuma	10,000	join LPIS competition
PSIM Yogyakarta	Yogyakarta	Yogyakarta	Mandala Krida	25,000	Semifinal 2011–12 Premier Division
PSIS Semarang	Semarang	Central Java	Jatidiri	25,000	join LPIS competition
PSMS Medan	Medan	North Sumatra	Teladan	22,234	16th 2011–12 Super League
PSKSB Sumbawa Barat	West Sumbawa	West Nusa Tenggara	Gelora Turide	15,000	Top 8 2011–12 Premier Division
Yahukimo FC	Yahukimo	Papua	TBD	–	Wildcard from 2012 First Division

=== Coach changes ===
==== Pre-season ====
Team	Outgoing coach	Manner of departure	Date of vacancy	Incoming coach	Date of appointment
Persiku Kudus	Riono Asnan	Signed by Persijap Jepara	28 August 2012	Lukas Tumbuan	September 2012
PSKSB West Sumbawa	Mustaqim	Signed by Persepam Madura United	4 September 2012		
Perseba Super		Contract terminated	September 2012	Nus Yadera	November 2012
Persebaya DU (Bhayangkara)	Yusuf Ekodono	Resigned	October 2012	Miroslav Janu	October 2012
PSMS Medan	Suharto AD	Mutual consent	November 2012	Suimin Diharja	November 2012
PSBK Blitar	Nus Yadera	Signed by Perseba Super	November 2012		
PSBS Biak	Rully Nere	End of contract	November 2012	Jailani	18 December 2012
Persebaya DU (Bhayangkara)	Miroslav Janu	Death	January 2013	Tony Ho	29 January 2013

==== In-season ====
Team	Outgoing coach	Manner of departure	Date of vacancy	Position in table	Incoming coach	Date of appointment
PSMS Medan	Suimin Diharja	Sacked	March 2013	3rd	Suharto AD	March 2013

== First round ==
The First round is played from 27 January 2013 to 21 June 2013

=== Group 1 ===
Pos	Team	Pld	W	D	L	GF	GA	GD	Pts	Qualification
1	PS Bangka	10	6	2	2	30	6	+24	20	Advanced to Second round
2	Persisko Bangko	10	6	1	3	14	13	+1	19	Advanced to Second round
3	PSAP Sigli	10	4	3	3	19	12	+7	15	
4	PSMS	10	4	3	3	17	16	+1	15	
5	Persih Tembilahan	10	2	3	5	9	19	−10	9	
6	PS Bengkulu	10	1	2	7	6	29	−23	5	

Updated to match(es) played on 9 June 2013. Source: 2013 Premier Division table
Rules for classification: 1) points; 2) goal difference; 3) number of goals scored.

==== Results ====
Home \ Away	PSIH	PSKO	PSAP	BGK	PSBU	MED
Persih Tembilahan		1–2	1–1	1–0	2–2	0–2
Persisko Bangko	3–1		1–0	1–0	2–0	0–3
PSAP Sigli	4–0	3–2		1–1	4–0	2–2
PS Bangka	4–0	5–1	2–0		11–0	3–2
PS Bengkulu	0–2	0–2	0–2	0–0		3–0
PSMS	1–1	0–0	3–2	0–4	4–1	

Updated to match(es) played on 9 June 2013. Source: 2013 Premier Division results
Legend: Blue = home team win; Yellow = draw; Red = away team win.

=== Group 2 ===
Pos	Team	Pld	W	D	L	GF	GA	GD	Pts	Qualification
1	PSCS Cilacap	16	10	5	1	23	10	+13	35	Advanced to Second round
2	Persikabo Bogor	16	10	4	2	28	10	+18	34	Advanced to Second round
3	PSIS	16	9	5	2	27	7	+20	32	Advanced to Second round
4	Persiku Kudus	16	4	7	5	14	17	−3	19	
5	Persitema Temanggung	16	4	6	6	15	14	+1	18	
6	Persip Pekalongan	16	4	4	8	12	25	−13	16	
7	Persipur Purwodadi	16	3	6	7	13	29	−16	15	
8	Persitara North Jak	16	3	5	8	14	18	−4	14	
9	Persikad Depok	16	2	4	10	13	29	−16	10	

Updated to match(es) played on 22 June 2013. Source: 2013 Premier Division table
Rules for classification: 1) points; 2) goal difference; 3) number of goals scored.

==== Results ====
Home \ Away	KABO	PKAD	PSKU	PSIP	PPUR	TARA	TEMA	PSCS	PSIS
Persikabo Bogor		0–0	5–0	2–0	4–1	2–0	2–0	1–1	2–0
Persikad Depok	1–2		0–0	0–0	4–0	3–2	2–2	0–2	0–1
Persiku Kudus	1–3	4–1		1–0	3–0	1–1	1–0	0–1	0–1
Persip Pekalongan	1–1	2–0	1–1		2–1	2–1	1–0	0–1	1–1
Persipur Purwodadi	2–0	1–0	1–1	3–1		1–1	1–1	1–1	0–0
Persitara North Jak	0–1	3–1	0–0	3–1	0–0		1–0	1–1	0–1
Persitema Temanggung	0–0	3–0	0–0	4–0	1–0	1–0		1–1	1–1
PSCS Cilacap	2–1	2–1	3–1	2–0	3–1	1–0	2–1		0–0
PSIS	1–2	5–0	0–0	4–0	7–0	2–1	2–0	1–0	

Updated to match(es) played on 22 June 2013. Source: 2013 Premier Division results
Legend: Blue = home team win; Yellow = draw; Red = away team win.

=== Group 3 ===
Pos	Team	Pld	W	D	L	GF	GA	GD	Pts	Qualification
1	Persebaya DU (Bhayangkara)	14	10	4	0	34	9	+25	34	Advanced to Second round
2	Perseba Super Bangkalan	14	7	1	6	24	23	+1	22	Advanced to Second round
3	Perseta Tulungagung	14	6	4	4	19	20	−1	22	Advanced to Second round
4	Deltras Sidoarjo	14	6	3	5	22	16	+6	21	
5	PSBK Blitar	14	6	3	5	19	15	+4	21	
6	Persekam Metro	14	4	2	8	16	25	−9	14	
7	Persebo Bondowoso	14	3	3	8	12	27	−15	12	
8	Persid Jember	14	1	6	7	9	20	−11	9	
9	Persipas Paser (Note: Due to the difficulty of funding is a problem that can not be overcome by the club, then Persipas Paser officially declared bankrupt and withdrew from participation in the league after serving a three match.)	0	0	0	0	0	0	0	0	Clubs expelled, records expunged

Updated to match(es) played on 11 June 2013. Source: 2013 Premier Division table
Rules for classification: 1) points; 2) goal difference; 3) number of goals scored.

==== Results ====
Home \ Away	DEL	SUBA	BHA	SEBO	KAMM	SETA	PSDJ	PSBK
Deltras Sidoarjo		2–0	1–3	3–0	4–0	2–0	4–1	1–3
Perseba Super Bangkalan	4–1		0–1	1–0	2–1	2–3	3–0	3–2
Persebaya DU (Bhayangkara)	0–0	5–2		1–1	5–1	4–1	2–0	2–0
Persebo Bondowoso	1–0	2–3	0–5		3–2	1–2	1–0	1–1
Persekam Metro	0–2	2–0	1–1	4–1		3–2	2–0	0–0
Perseta Tulungagung	0–0	2–1	1–1	2–0	1–0		1–1	3–2
Persid Jember	1–1	2–2	0–1	1–1	2–0	1–1		0–1
PSBK Blitar	3–1	0–1	1–3	2–0	2–0	2–0	0–0	

Updated to match(es) played on 11 June 2013. Source: 2013 Premier Division results
Legend: Blue = home team win; Yellow = draw; Red = away team win.

=== Group 4 ===
Pos	Team	Pld	W	D	L	GF	GA	GD	Pts	Qualification
1	Perseru	14	11	2	1	22	6	+16	35	Advanced to Second round
2	PSBS	14	7	3	4	24	16	+8	24	Advanced to Second round
3	Perseka Kaimana	14	5	5	4	23	16	+7	20	
4	Persbul Buol	14	5	4	5	25	19	+6	19	
5	Sumbawa Barat	14	5	3	6	18	21	−3	18	
6	Persigo	14	4	3	7	10	23	−13	15	
7	Perssin Sinjai	14	4	2	8	16	26	−10	14	
8	Yahukimo	14	3	2	9	12	23	−11	11	

Updated to match(es) played on 9 June 2013. Source: 2013 Premier Division table
Rules for classification: 1) points; 2) goal difference; 3) number of goals scored.

==== Results ====
Home \ Away	BUOL	SEKA	PSR	SEM	SINJ	BIA	SUMB	YAHU
Persbul Buol		2–2	1–1	2–1	5–1	3–3	4–1	3–0
Perseka Kaimana	2–1		1–2	1–0	3–0	3–0	2–2	3–0
Perseru	1–0	2–1		3–0	1–0	2–1	3–0	1–0
Persigo	0–0	3–2	1–0		1–0	1–1	1–1	1–0
Perssin Sinjai	3–2	1–1	0–3	5–1		0–3	4–1	2–1
PSBS	3–1	1–1	0–1	3–0	2–0		2–0	2–1
Sumbawa Barat	1–0	1–0	0–0	3–0	2–0	0–2		6–0
Yahukimo	0–1	1–1	1–2	2–0	0–0	3–1	3–0	

Updated to match(es) played on 9 June 2013. Source: 2013 Premier Division results
Legend: Blue = home team win; Yellow = draw; Red = away team win.

=== Group 5 ===
Pos	Team	Pld	W	D	L	GF	GA	GD	Pts	Qualification
1	Persik Kediri	12	9	2	1	25	4	+21	29	Advanced to Second round
2	PS Mojokerto Putra	12	7	0	5	20	13	+7	21	Advanced to Second round
3	Persis	12	5	3	4	17	20	−3	18	
4	PSIM	12	5	2	5	20	18	+2	17	
5	Persewangi Banyuwangi	12	4	3	5	14	16	−2	15	
6	Madiun Putra	12	4	2	6	18	23	−5	14	
7	PPSM Sakti Magelang	12	0	4	8	12	32	−20	4	

Updated to match(es) played on 10 June 2013. Source: 2013 Premier Division table
Rules for classification: 1) points; 2) goal difference; 3) number of goals scored.

==== Results ====
Home \ Away	MADI	PMP	PSBY	PSIK	SOL	PPSM	YOG
Madiun Putra		2–1	1–3	1–0	0–1	3–2	4–1
PS Mojokerto Putra	2–0		3–1	1–5	3–0	1–0	2–0
Persewangi Banyuwangi	3–2	1–0		0–0	2–3	2–0	1–1
Persik Kediri	3–0	1–0	1–0		3–0	4–0	4–0
Persis	1–1	3–1	1–0	1–2		4–2	1–1
PPSM Sakti Magelang	3–3	0–5	1–1	1–1	1–1		1–4
PSIM	3–1	0–1	3–0	0–1	4–1	3–1	

Updated to match(es) played on 10 June 2013. Source: 2013 Premier Division results
Legend: Blue = home team win; Yellow = draw; Red = away team win.

== Second round ==
The 12 teams were drawn into three groups of four. Each group was played on a home-and-away round-robin basis. The winners of each group and one best runners-up advanced to the semi-final. The second round is played from 28 June 2013 to 30 August 2013.

=== Group A ===
Pos	Team	Pld	W	D	L	GF	GA	GD	Pts	Qualification	PSIK	PSCS	PSKO	SETA
1	Persik Kediri	6	5	0	1	16	5	+11	15	Advance to knockout stage		2–0	1–0	4–0
2	PSCS Cilacap	6	4	0	2	7	4	+3	12		1–0		2–0	1–0
3	Persisko Bangko	6	1	1	4	12	15	−3	4		3–4	1–3		2–2
4	Perseta Tulungagung	6	1	1	4	7	18	−11	4		1–5	1–0	3–6	

=== Group B ===
Pos	Team	Pld	W	D	L	GF	GA	GD	Pts	Qualification	BHA	PSBS	BGK	PSIS
1	Persebaya DU (Bhayangkara)	6	3	3	0	9	5	+4	12	Advance to knockout stage		1–0	2–1	2–0
2	PSBS Biak Numfor	6	3	1	2	8	6	+2	10		1–1		1–0	3–1
3	PS Bangka	6	2	2	2	6	5	+1	8		1–1	2–0		2–1
4	PSIS Semarang	6	0	2	4	5	12	−7	2		2–2	1–3	0–0	

=== Group C ===
Pos	Team	Pld	W	D	L	GF	GA	GD	Pts	Qualification	PSRU	KABO	PSMP	SEBA
1	Perseru Serui	6	4	2	0	12	3	+9	14	Advance to knockout stage		3–2	3–0 (Note: Mojokerto Putra loses 3–0 against Perseru Serui after did not attend the match on 24 August 2013 in Marora Stadium.)	2–0
2	Persikabo Bogor	6	4	1	1	12	7	+5	13	Advance to knockout stage	0–0		3–1	3–1
3	Mojokerto Putra	6	1	1	4	9	13	−4	4		1–1	0–1		5–1
4	Perseba Super	6	1	0	5	8	18	−10	3		0–3	2–3	4–2	

=== Best Runner-up ===
Pos	Team	Pld	W	D	L	GF	GA	GD	Pts	Qualification
1	Persikabo Bogor	6	4	1	1	12	7	+5	13	Advance to knockout stage
2	PSCS Cilacap	6	4	0	2	7	4	+3	12	
3	PSBS Biak Numfor	6	3	1	2	8	6	+2	10	

== Knockout stage ==
For this season in the knock-out stage, the 4 teams play a single-elimination tournament. The draw for the semi-finals took place on 2 September 2013 at the headquarters of the Football Association of Indonesia. All matches will play in Manahan Stadium in Surakarta, Central Java.

=== Bracket ===
Semi-finals
8 September – Solo, Central Java
Persikabo	1
Persebaya DU (Bhayangkara)	4
8 September – Solo, Central Java
Persik	2 (4)
Perseru (p)	2 (5)

Final
14 September – Solo, Central Java
Persebaya DU (Bhayangkara)	2
Perseru	0
Third place
14 September – Solo, Central Java
Persikabo	2
Persik	6

=== Semi-finals ===
Play On 8 September 2013

Team 1	Score	Team 2
Persikabo Bogor	1 – 4	Persebaya DU (Bhayangkara)
Persik Kediri	2 – 2 (4 – 5 pso.)	Perseru Serui

=== Third-placed ===
Play On 14 September 2013

Team 1	Score	Team 2
Persikabo Bogor	2 – 6	Persik Kediri

=== Final ===
Play On 14 September 2013

Team 1	Score	Team 2
Persebaya DU (Bhayangkara)	2 – 0	Perseru Serui

== Champions ==
Premier Division 2013 winner

Achievement
Best Player	Topscorer
Jean Paul Boumsong	Jean Paul Boumsong; Oliver Makor

== Promotion/relegation play-off ==
Play On 22 September 2013 in Manahan Stadium, Surakarta ( Central Java)

Team 1	Score	Team 2
Pelita Bandung Raya	2–1	Persikabo Bogor

== Season statistics ==
=== Top scorers ===
Rank	Player	Club	Goals
1	(Cameroon) Jean Paul Boumsong	Persebaya DU (Bhayangkara)	18
1	(Liberia) Oliver Makor	Persik Kediri	18
3	Marc Orland Etogou	Perseru Serui	11
4	Cristiano Lopes	Persikabo Bogor	10
4	Purwanto Suwondo	PSBK Blitar	10
6	Danilo Fernando	Perseba Super	9
6	Dede Hugo Kunarko	Perseta Tulungagung	9
6	Mustopa Aji	Persikabo Bogor	9
6	Baso Bintang	Perssin Sinjai	9
6	Varney Pas Boakay	PSBS Biak Numfor	9
6	Addison Alves	PSIS Semarang	9

=== Own goals ===
Player	For	Club
Kasiadi	Persid Jember	Deltras
Godstime Ouseloka	Persebaya DU (Bhayangkara)	PSBK Blitar
Sugiat	Persitara Jakarta Utara	Persip Pekalongan
Agus Supriyanto	Persikabo Bogor	Persiku Kudus
Djaledjete Bedalbe	Deltras Sidoarjo	Persebaya DU (Bhayangkara)
Muhammad Kusen	Persebaya DU (Bhayangkara)	Persebo Bondowoso
Riski Setiawan	Persitara Jakarta Utara	Persip Pekalongan
Miftachul Camli	Persikabo Bogor	Perseba Super
Peter Lipede	Persikabo Bogor	Mojokerto Putra

=== Hat-tricks ===
Player	For	Against	Result	Date
Yanuarius Y. Kahol	PS Bangka	PSMS Medan	4 – 0	14 February 2013
Baso Bintang	Perssin Sinjai	Persigo Gorontalo	5 – 1	23 March 2013
Baso Bintang	Perssin Sinjai	Persbul Buol	3 – 2	27 March 2013
Jean Paul Boumsong	Persebaya DU (Bhayangkara)	Perseba Super	5 – 2	2 April 2013
Jackson Hans Osok^{4}	PS Bangka	Persisko Bangko	5 – 1	27 April 2013
Ronnie	Persikad Depok	Persipur Purwodadi	4 – 0	24 May 2013
Martial Poungoue Nz^{5}	PS Bangka	PS Bengkulu	11 – 0	26 May 2013
Engkus Kushawa	Deltras	Persekam Metro	4 – 0	6 June 2013
Addison Alves	PSIS Semarang	Persikad Depok	5 – 0	9 June 2013
Sumaryanto	Persitema Temanggung	Persip Pekalongan	4 – 0	11 June 2013
Beto^{4}	Persiku Kudus	Persikad Depok	4 – 1	13 June 2013
Oliver Makor	Persik Kediri	Perseta Tulungagung	5 – 1	19 August 2013
Marc Orland Etogou	Perseru Serui	Perseba Super	3 – 0	19 August 2013
Cristiano Lopes	Persikabo Bogor	Perseba Super	3 – 1	24 August 2013
Christian Alejandro	Persisko Bangko	Perseta Tulungagung	6 – 3	30 August 2013
Oliver Makor	Persik Kediri	Persikabo Bogor	6 – 2	14 September 2013

- ^{4} Player scored 4 goals
- ^{5} Player scored 5 goals

=== Scoring ===
- First goal of the season: Emile Linkers for PSIS Semarang against PSCS Cilacap (27 January 2013)
- Last goal of the season: Jean Paul Boumsong for Persebaya DU (Bhayangkara) against Perseru Serui (14 September 2013)
- Fastest goal of the season: 1 minutes – Irfandani for PSAP Sigli against Persisko Bangko (9 June 2013)
- Widest winning margin: 11 goals
  - PS Bangka 11–0 PS Bengkulu (26 May 2013)
- Highest scoring game: 11 goals
  - PS Bangka 11–0 PS Bengkulu (26 May 2013)
- Most goals scored in a match by a single team: 11 goals
  - PS Bangka 11–0 PS Bengkulu (26 May 2013)
- Most goals scored in a match by a losing team: 3 goal
  - Persisko Bangko 3–4 Persik Kediri (3 July 2013)
  - Perseta Tulungagung 3–6 Persisko Bangko (30 August 2013)
- Widest home winning margin: 11 goals
  - PS Bangka 11–0 PS Bengkulu (26 May 2013)
- Widest away winning margin: 5 goals
  - Persebo Bondowoso 0–5 Persebaya DU (Bhayangkara) (23 April 2013)
  - PPSM Sakti Magelang 0–5 PS Mojokerto Putra (11 May 2013)
- Most goals scored by a home team: 11 goals
  - PS Bangka 11–0 PS Bengkulu (26 May 2013)
- Most goals scored by an away team: 6 goals
  - Perseta Tulungagung 3–6 Persisko Bangko (30 August 2013)

=== Clean sheets ===
- Most Clean Sheets: 12
  - PSIS Semarang
- Fewest clean sheets: 0
  - PPSM Sakti Magelang
