= Ayomi (name) =

Ayomi is a name. Notable people with the name include:

- Ayomi Yoshida (born 1958), Japanese artist
- Tonny Roy Ayomi (born 1992), Indonesian footballer
