= Persikad Depok (1990) =

Indonesian football club

- Full name: Persatuan Sepakbola Indonesia Kota Administratif Depok
- Nickname: Knight of Ciliwung The Thunderbolt The Margonda Wolves
- Founded: 1990
- Dissolved: 2017 (became Bogor FC)
- Ground: Merpati Stadium
- Capacity: 10,000
- Owner(s): Depok government (45%); Edy Djoekardi (55%)
- 2017: Liga 2, 5th in Group 2 (relegated)
- Website: http://www.persikad.net
Home colours	Away colours

Persatuan Sepakbola Indonesia Kota Administratif Depok (simply known as Persikad) was an Indonesian football club based in Depok, West Java. Along with the financial crisis experienced, Persikad underwent a change of ownership and was renamed to Bogor FC in 2017.

Persikad's home ground was Merpati Stadium, which is located in Depok, West Java.

== History ==
In 2009, Persikad experienced a severe financial crisis that left the management team owing 11 months' wages to the players. A businessman named Edy Djoekardi rescued the team by buying a majority stake in PT. Persikad Depok. Djoekardi planned to invest millions of dollars to build a team capable of performing up to the international scene, and to build infrastructure, such as stadiums. The club was finally sold, relocated to Bogor, and rebranded as Bogor F.C. in 2017 similar story to Milton Keynes Dons F.C., but later the supporters formed a phoenix club called Persikad 1999 in 2018.

== Performance by seasons ==
Season	League	Tier	Tms.	Pos.	Piala Indonesia
2002	Second Division	3		2	–
2003	First Division	2	26	4th, Group A	–
2004	First Division	2	24	10th, West division	–
2005	First Division	2	27	4th, Group 1	–
2006	First Division	2	36	4th, Group 2	–
2007	First Division	2	40	2	–
2008–09	Premier Division	2	29	10th, Group 1	–
2009–10	Premier Division	2	33	Disqualified	–
2010	First Division	3	57	5th, Group 5	–
2012	First Division (BLAI)	3	56	5th, Third round	–
2013	Premier Division	2	39	9th, Group 2	–
2014	Premier Division	2	63	6th, Group 2	–
2015	Premier Division	2	55	did not finish	–
2016	Indonesia Soccer Championship B	2	53	4th, Group 2	–
2017	Liga 2	2	61	5th, Group 2	–

== Notable former players ==
This is the list of several domestic and foreign former notable or famous players of Persikad from time to time.

=== Indonesia ===
- (Indonesia) Dhika Bayangkara
- (Indonesia) Adittia Gigis
- (Indonesia) Cucu Hidayat
- (Indonesia) Sansan Husaeni
- (Indonesia) Reksa Maulana
- (Indonesia) Ricky Ohorella
- (Indonesia) Samsul Pelu
- (Indonesia) Muhammad Roby
- (Indonesia) Nehemia Solossa

=== Africa (CAF) ===
- (Cameroon) Jean Paul Boumsong
- (Cameroon) Nnana Onana

=== South America (CONMEBOL) ===
- (Chile) Patricio Jiménez
- (Chile) Eladio Rojas
