= 2016 Indonesia Soccer Championship B =

Indonesia Soccer Championship B
- Season: 2016
- Dates: 30 April – 22 December 2016
- Champions: PSCS Cilacap
- Runner up: PSS Sleman
- Promoted: none
- Relegated: none
- Matches: 328
- Goals: 819 (2.5 per match)
- Best player: Ugik Sugiyanto (PSCS Cilacap)
- Top goalscorer: Johan Yoga (PSIS Semarang) (15 goals)
- Biggest home win: Persekam Metro 7–1 PS Sumbawa Barat (25 July 2016)
- Biggest away win: PS Sumbawa Barat 0–4 Perssu Sumenep (30 July 2016); PSMP Mojokerto 0–4 PSS Sleman (14 August 2016)
- Highest scoring: Kalteng Putra 3–6 Persita Tangerang (1 October 2016)
- Longest winning run: 6 games Persik Kediri
- Longest unbeaten run: 12 games Persik Kediri
- Longest winless run: 9 games PSBK Blitar; Laga; Persigubin Bintang Mountains
- Longest losing run: 6 games PS Sumbawa Barat

The 2016 Indonesia Soccer Championship B is the inaugural season of the Indonesia Soccer Championship B, a football competition that replaced the temporarily suspended Liga Indonesia Premier Division. This competition started on 30 April 2016.

PSCS Cilacap became champion after beating PSS Sleman 4–3 after extra time in the final.

== Teams ==
Indonesia Soccer Championship B was competed for by 53 clubs from 2015 Liga Indonesia Premier Division. But later on, PS Badung Bali and Persires Rengat withdrew from the tournament.

=== Stadiums and locations ===
Locations of the teams in the 2016 Indonesia Soccer Championship B.
Locations of the teams from Java in the 2016 Indonesia Soccer Championship B.

Club	Location	Province	Stadium	Capacity
Celebest	Palu	Central Sulawesi	Tuah Pahoe; Gawalise	5,000; 20,000
Cilegon United	Cilegon	Banten	Krakatau Steel	20,000
Kalteng Putra	Palangka Raya	Central Kalimantan	Tuah Pahoe; Gawalise	5,000; 20,000
Laga	Surabaya	East Java	Gelora Bung Tomo	55,000
Madiun Putra	Madiun	East Java	Wilis	25,000
Martapura	Martapura	South Kalimantan	Demang Lehman	6,500
Persatu Tuban	Tuban	East Java	Loka Jaya	2,000
Persbul Buol	Buol	Central Sulawesi	Tuah Pahoe; Gawalise	5,000; 20,000
Persebo Musi Raya	Musi Banyuasin	South Sumatra	Serasan Sekate	5,000
Persekam Metro	Malang Regency	East Java	Kanjuruhan	42,449
Persekap Pasuruan	Pasuruan	East Java	Untung Suropati	5,000
Persepam Madura Utama	Pamekasan	East Java	Gelora Bangkalan	15,000
Perserang Serang	Serang	Banten	Maulana Yusuf	15,000
Persewangi Banyuwangi	Banyuwangi	East Java	Diponegoro	15,000
Persiba Bantul	Bantul	Yogyakarta	Sultan Agung	35,000
Persibangga Purbalingga	Purbalingga	Central Java	Goentoer Darjono	15,000
Persibas Banyumas	Banyumas	Central Java	GOR Satria	15,000
Persibat Batang	Batang	Central Java	Moh Sarengat	12,000
Persida Sidoarjo	Sidoarjo	East Java	Gelora Delta	35,000
Persigo Gorontalo	Gorontalo	Gorontalo	Tuah Pahoe; Gawalise	5,000; 20,000
Persigubin Bintang Mountains	Bintang Mountains	Papua	Tuah Pahoe; Gawalise	5,000; 20,000
Persijap Jepara	Jepara	Central Java	Gelora Bumi Kartini	23,000
Persik Kediri	Kediri	East Java	Brawijaya	25,000
Persika Karawang	Karawang	West Java	Singaperbangsa	25,000
Persikabo Bogor	Bogor Regency	West Java	Persikabo	15,000
Persikad Depok	Depok	West Java	Merpati	3,000
Persinga Ngawi	Ngawi	East Java	Ketonggo	10,000
Persip Pekalongan	Pekalongan	Central Java	Jenderal Hoegeng	20,000
Persipur Purwodadi	Grobogan	Central Java	Krida Bakti	12,000
Persiraja Banda Aceh	Banda Aceh	Aceh	H. Dimurthala; Harapan Bangsa	20,000; 45,000
Persis Surakarta	Surakarta	Central Java	Manahan	25,000
Persita Tangerang	Tangerang	Banten	Singaperbangsa	25,000
Perssu Super Madura	Sumenep	East Java	Ahmad Yani	15,000
PPSM Sakti Magelang	Magelang	Central Java	Moch. Soebroto	10,000
PS Bengkulu	Bengkulu	Bengkulu	Semarak	15,000
PSMP Mojokerto	Mojokerto Regency	East Java	Gajahmada Mojosari	10,000
PS Sumbawa Barat	West Sumbawa	West Nusa Tenggara	December 17th	15,000
PS Bangka	Bangka	Bangka-Belitung Islands	Orom Sungailiat	7,000
PS Bintang Jaya Asahan	Asahan	North Sumatra	Mutiara Kisaran	10,000
PSBI Blitar	Blitar Regency	East Java	Gelora Panataran	8,000
PSBK Blitar	Blitar	East Java	Gelora Supriyadi	15,000
PSBL Langsa	Langsa	Aceh	Langsa	15,000
PSCS Cilacap	Cilacap	Central Java	Wijayakusuma	15,000
PSGC Ciamis	Ciamis	West Java	Galuh	25,000
PSIM Yogyakarta	Yogyakarta	Yogyakarta	Mandala Krida	25,000
PSIR Rembang	Rembang	Central Java	Krida	10,000
PSIS Semarang	Semarang	Central Java	Jatidiri	25,000
PSMS Medan	Medan	North Sumatra	Teladan	20,000
PSPS Pekanbaru	Pekanbaru	Riau	Rumbai	30,000
PSS Sleman	Sleman	Yogyakarta	Maguwoharjo	40,000
Yahukimo	Yahukimo	Papua	Tuah Pahoe; Gawalise	5,000; 20,000

== First round ==
The first round was held on 30 April-4 September 2016. All groups will play home and away round-robin tournament.

=== Group 1 ===
Pos	Team	Pld	W	D	L	GF	GA	GD	Pts	Qualification or relegation	PBA	PEK	MED	PSL	MUS	BAN	BIN
1	Persiraja Banda Aceh (A)	12	8	1	3	19	10	+9	25	Advance to Second round	—	3–2	3–0	0–0	3–0	3–0	1–0
2	PSPS Pekanbaru (A)	12	6	2	4	20	14	+6	20	Advance to Second round	1–2	—	1–0	2–1	1–1	2–1	3–0
3	PSMS Medan	12	5	3	4	18	13	+5	18		3–1	2–3	—	2–0	5–0	1–0	1–1
4	PSBL Langsa	12	6	0	6	12	17	−5	18		3–1	0–3	1–0	—	2–1	2–1	2–1
5	Persebo Musi Raya	12	4	3	5	11	16	−5	15		1–0	1–0	1–2	1–0	—	2–2	3–0
6	PS Bangka	12	4	2	6	15	15	0	14		0–1	1–0	1–1	4–0	1–0	—	3–1
7	PS Bintang Jaya Asahan	12	1	5	6	8	18	−10	8		0–0	2–2	1–1	0–1	0–0	2–1	—

Updated to match(es) played on 4 September 2016. Source: ISC
Rules for classification: 1) points; 2) goal difference; 3) number of goals scored.
(A) Advance to a further round

=== Group 2 ===
Pos	Team	Pld	W	D	L	GF	GA	GD	Pts	Qualification	TGR	SER	CLU	PUR	BEN	BOG	SKH
1	Persita Tangerang (A)	10	6	3	1	18	6	+12	21	Advance to Second round	—	1–0	6–2	3–0	3–1	2–0	
2	Perserang Serang (A)	10	5	4	1	9	4	+5	19	Advance to Second round	0–0	—	1–1	2–0	2–1	0–0	
3	Cilegon United	10	4	3	3	17	14	+3	15		1–1	0–1	—	1–2	1–1	4–0	
4	Persikad Depok	10	2	4	4	7	12	−5	10		2–0	0–0	2–4	—	0–0	2–1	
5	PS Bengkulu	10	2	3	5	8	11	−3	9		0–0	0–1	2–0	0–0	—	3–0	
6	Persikabo Bogor	10	2	1	7	5	17	−12	7		0–2	1–2	0–1	1–0	2–1	—	
7	Persires Rengat (X)	0	0	0	0	0	0	0	0	Withdrawn							—

Updated to match(es) played on 4 September 2016. Source: ISC
Rules for classification: 1) points; 2) goal difference; 3) number of goals scored.
(A) Advance to a further round; (X) Withdrawn

=== Group 3 ===
Pos	Team	Pld	W	D	L	GF	GA	GD	Pts	Qualification or relegation	CIA	CIL	KAL	KAR	SOL	BYM	PUB
1	PSGC Ciamis (A)	12	6	5	1	21	7	+14	23	Advance to Second round	—	1–1	3–0	3–0	1–0	4–0	2–0
2	PSCS Cilacap (A)	12	7	2	3	16	5	+11	23	Advance to Second round	1–1	—	5–0	1–0	1–0	2–0	3–0
3	Persip Pekalongan	12	5	2	5	11	16	−5	17		3–1	1–0	—	1–2	0–0	1–0	1–0
4	Persika Karawang	12	5	1	6	11	15	−4	16		1–1	1–0	2–1	—	2–0	1–2	2–0
5	Persis Surakarta	12	3	5	4	11	10	+1	14		1–1	0–1	2–1	3–0	—	2–2	2–0
6	Persibas Banyumas	12	3	3	6	9	18	−9	12		0–3	1–0	1–2	1–0	1–1	—	0–0
7	Persibangga Purbalingga	12	2	4	6	4	12	−8	10		0–0	0–1	0–0	2–0	0–0	2–1	—

Updated to match(es) played on 4 September 2016. Source: ISC
Rules for classification: 1) points; 2) goal difference; 3) number of goals scored.
(A) Advance to a further round

=== Group 4 ===
Pos	Team	Pld	W	D	L	GF	GA	GD	Pts	Qualification or relegation	SMR	YOG	JAP	BAT	REM	MAG	PUR
1	PSIS Semarang (A)	12	9	1	2	23	7	+16	28	Advance to Second round	—	2–1	4–0	0–0	1–0	1–0	3–0
2	PSIM Yogyakarta (A)	12	6	2	4	17	9	+8	20	Advance to Second round	1–0	—	2–0	0–0	1–0	2–0	3–0
3	Persijap Jepara	12	5	3	4	13	14	−1	18		2–0	1–0	—	2–0	2–2	2–0	2–0
4	Persibat Batang	12	4	4	4	13	13	0	16		1–4	2–2	4–1	—	2–0	1–1	1–0
5	PSIR Rembang	12	4	4	4	13	13	0	16		1–2	2–1	1–1	2–1	—	1–1	1–0
6	PPSM Sakti Magelang	12	2	4	6	10	18	−8	10		1–3	0–3	0–0	1–0	1–1	—	3–1
7	Persipur Purwodadi	12	3	0	9	7	22	−15	9		0–3	2–1	1–0	0–1	0–2	3–2	—

Updated to match(es) played on 10 September 2016. Source: ISC
Rules for classification: 1) points; 2) goal difference; 3) number of goals scored.
(A) Advance to a further round

=== Group 5 ===
Pos	Team	Pld	W	D	L	GF	GA	GD	Pts	Qualification or relegation	SLE	MAR	MAP	BLI	BAN	MOJ	NGA
1	PSS Sleman (A)	10	7	2	1	19	8	+11	23	Advance to Second round	—	2–1	1–1	4–1	2–1	3–0	
2	Martapura (A)	10	6	1	3	21	11	+10	19	Advance to Second round	3–0	—	1–0	3–1	1–0	5–0	2–0
3	Madiun Putra	10	4	3	3	19	14	+5	15		0–0	5–2	—	6–1	3–2	1–0	
4	PSBI Blitar	10	4	2	4	15	19	−4	14		1–2	2–1	4–1	—	1–0	3–1	1–2
5	Persiba Bantul	10	2	2	6	11	16	−5	8		0–1	1–1	2–1	0–0	—	3–0	1–2
6	PSMP Mojokerto	10	1	2	7	9	26	−17	5		0–4	0–3	1–1	1–1	6–2	—	1–1
7	Persinga Ngawi (D)	0	0	0	0	0	0	0	0	Disqualified	2–1	2–1	2–1	1–1			—

Updated to match(es) played on 4 September 2016. Source: ISC
Rules for classification: 1) points; 2) goal difference; 3) number of goals scored.
(A) Advance to a further round; (D) Disqualified

=== Group 6 ===
Pos	Team	Pld	W	D	L	GF	GA	GD	Pts	Qualification or relegation	KED	MAD	SID	TUB	BLI	LAG
1	Persik Kediri (A)	10	8	2	0	20	5	+15	26	Advance to Second round	—	2–1	3–0	2–1	2–1	2–0
2	Persepam Madura Utama (A)	10	5	3	2	16	7	+9	18	Advance to Second round	0–0	—	3–1	2–0	4–0	1–0
3	Persida Sidoarjo	10	4	0	6	16	16	0	12		1–4	1–0	—	3–1	4–0	4–1
4	Persatu Tuban	10	3	3	4	13	15	−2	12		1–2	2–2	1–1	—	2–0	2–1
5	PSBK Blitar	10	1	5	4	8	18	−10	8		0–0	1–1	2–1	2–2	—	1–1
6	Laga	10	1	2	7	5	17	−12	5		0–3	0–2	1–0	0–1	1–1	—

Updated to match(es) played on 7 August 2016. Source: ISC
Rules for classification: 1) points; 2) goal difference; 3) number of goals scored.
(A) Advance to a further round

=== Group 7 ===
Pos	Team	Pld	W	D	L	GF	GA	GD	Pts	Qualification	SUM	PAS	MET	BAN	SBA	BAD
1	Perssu Super Madura (A)	8	6	1	1	20	5	+15	19	Advance to Second round	—	3–0	3–1	2–0	5–0	
2	Persekap Pasuruan (A)	8	4	1	3	12	12	0	13	Advance to Second round	2–0	—	1–1	1–3	2–0	
3	Persekam Metro	8	3	3	2	16	11	+5	12		1–1	2–3	—	1–0	7–1	
4	Persewangi Banyuwangi	8	3	2	3	12	9	+3	11		1–2	2–1	1–1	—	4–0	
5	PS Sumbawa Barat	8	0	1	7	4	27	−23	1		0–4	1–2	1–2	1–1	—	
6	PS Badung (X)	0	0	0	0	0	0	0	0	Withdrawn						—

Updated to match(es) played on 13 August 2016. Source: ISC
Rules for classification: 1) points; 2) goal difference; 3) number of goals scored.
(A) Advance to a further round; (X) Withdrawn

=== Group 8 ===
Pos	Team	Pld	W	D	L	GF	GA	GD	Pts	Qualification or relegation	CEL	KAL	YAH	GOR	BUO	GBI
1	Celebest (A)	10	7	2	1	17	5	+12	23	Advance to Second round	—	2–1	2–1	2–0	4–0	0–0
2	Kalteng Putra (A)	10	7	1	2	17	8	+9	22	Advance to Second round	2–1	—	2–1	3–0	3–1	2–1
3	Yahukimo	10	3	3	4	12	10	+2	12		1–1	0–0	—	0–1	1–1	3–2
4	Persigo Gorontalo	10	3	2	5	6	12	−6	11		0–1	0–2	0–3	—	1–0	3–0
5	Persbul Buol	10	2	3	5	7	18	−11	9		0–3	2–1	1–0	1–1	—	0–3
6	Persigubin Bintang Mountains	10	1	3	6	7	13	−6	6		0–1	0–1	0–2	0–0	1–1	—

Updated to match(es) played on 4 September 2016. Source: ISC
Rules for classification: 1) points; 2) goal difference; 3) number of goals scored.
(A) Advance to a further round

== Second round ==
The second round was held on 30 September-14 November 2016. All groups will play home and away round-robin tournament.

=== Group A ===
Pos	Team	Pld	W	D	L	GF	GA	GD	Pts	Qualification or relegation	CIL	SUM	YOG	PBA
1	PSCS Cilacap (A)	6	3	2	1	7	4	+3	11	Advance to Quarter-finals	—	1–0	1–0	3–0
2	Perssu Super Madura (A)	6	3	1	2	5	4	+1	10	Advance to Quarter-finals	0–0	—	1–0	1–0
3	PSIM Yogyakarta	6	2	1	3	6	8	−2	7		3–1	0–3^{1}	—	1–1
4	Persiraja Banda Aceh	6	1	2	3	6	8	−2	5		1–1	3–0	1–2	—

Updated to match(es) played on 12 November 2016. Source: ISC
Rules for classification: 1) points; 2) goal difference; 3) number of goals scored.
(A) Advance to a further round

^1Perssu Super Madura awarded 3–0 win over PSIM Yogyakarta that failed to host the match due to not get permission from the police.

=== Group B ===
Pos	Team	Pld	W	D	L	GF	GA	GD	Pts	Qualification or relegation	SLE	TGR	MAD	KAL
1	PSS Sleman (A)	6	4	2	0	11	3	+8	14	Advance to Quarter-finals	—	1–0	1–1	5–1
2	Persita Tangerang (A)	6	3	2	1	12	7	+5	11	Advance to Quarter-finals	0–0	—	3–1	2–1
3	Persepam Madura Utama	6	1	2	3	4	7	−3	5		0–1	1–1	—	1–0
4	Kalteng Putra	6	1	0	5	7	17	−10	3		1–3	3–6	1–0	—

Updated to match(es) played on 12 November 2016. Source: ISC
Rules for classification: 1) points; 2) goal difference; 3) number of goals scored.
(A) Advance to a further round

=== Group C ===
Pos	Team	Pld	W	D	L	GF	GA	GD	Pts	Qualification or relegation	MAR	SER	KED	CEL
1	Martapura (A)	6	3	2	1	12	6	+6	11	Advance to Quarter-finals	—	3–1	4–0	3–2
2	Perserang Serang (A)	6	3	2	1	10	7	+3	11	Advance to Quarter-finals	0–0	—	4–3	2–0
3	Persik Kediri	6	3	1	2	9	11	−2	10		2–1	1–1	—	1–0
4	Celebest	6	0	1	5	4	11	−7	1		1–1	0–2	1–2	—

Updated to match(es) played on 12 November 2016. Source: ISC
Rules for classification: 1) points; 2) goal difference; 3) number of goals scored.
(A) Advance to a further round

=== Group D ===
Pos	Team	Pld	W	D	L	GF	GA	GD	Pts	Qualification or relegation	PEK	PAS	SMR	CIA
1	PSPS Pekanbaru (A)	6	2	3	1	11	10	+1	9	Advance to Quarter-finals	—	4–3	2–1	1–1
2	Persekap Pasuruan (A)	6	3	0	3	9	13	−4	9	Advance to Quarter-finals	3–2	—	1–0	1–0
3	PSIS Semarang	6	2	2	2	7	5	+2	8		0–0	3–1	—	3–1
4	PSGC Ciamis	6	1	3	2	8	7	+1	6		2–2	4–0	0–0	—

Updated to match(es) played on 12 November 2016. Source: ISC
Rules for classification: 1) points; 2) goal difference; 3) number of goals scored.
(A) Advance to a further round

== Knockout stage ==
The knockout stage was held on 9–22 December 2016.

=== Quarter-finals ===
Matches for Quarter-finals were played at 9–10 December 2016. All matches were held in Gelora Bumi Kartini, Jepara

9 December 2016	PSS Sleman	3–2	Perserang Serang	Jepara
15:30				Stadium: Gelora Bumi Kartini; Referee: Oki Dwi Putra Sanjaya

9 December 2016	PSPS Pekanbaru	1–2	Perssu Super Madura	Jepara
19:00				Stadium: Gelora Bumi Kartini; Referee: Dodi Setia Purnama

10 December 2016	PSCS Cilacap	1–0	Persita Tangerang	Jepara
15:30				Stadium: Gelora Bumi Kartini; Referee: Rully Ruslin Tambuntina

10 December 2016	Martapura	3–1	Persekap Pasuruan	Jepara
19:00				Stadium: Gelora Bumi Kartini; Referee: Hadiyana

=== Semi-finals ===
Matches for Semi-finals were played at 14 December 2016. All matches were held in Gelora Bumi Kartini, Jepara

14 December 2016	Perssu Super Madura	1–2 (a.e.t.)	PSS Sleman	Jepara
15:30				Stadium: Gelora Bumi Kartini; Referee: Ahmad Tuharea

14 December 2016	PSCS Cilacap	2–1 (a.e.t.)	Martapura	Jepara
19:00				Stadium: Gelora Bumi Kartini; Referee: Heru Santoso

=== Third Place ===
The Third Place Play-off match was played at 17 December 2016 and was held in Manahan, Surakarta

17 December 2016	Perssu Super Madura	0–0 (2–1 p)	Martapura	Surakarta
15:30				Stadium: Manahan; Referee: Suyanto

=== Final ===
The Final was played at 22 December 2016 and was held in Gelora Bumi Kartini, Jepara

22 December 2016	PSS Sleman	3–4 (a.e.t.)	PSCS Cilacap	Jepara
19:00	Dave Mustaine 1'; Busari 78'; Tri Handoko 106'		Ugik Sugiyanto 7'; 32'; Haudi Abdillah 101'; Said Nurul Aksori 109'	Stadium: Gelora Bumi Kartini; Attendance: 20,000; Referee: Oki Dwi Putra Senjaya

== Champions ==
Champions

PSCS Cilacap
1st title

== See also ==
- 2016 Indonesia Soccer Championship A
- 2016 Liga Nusantara
- 2016 Indonesia Soccer Championship U-21
- 2016 Soeratin Cup
