= Liston Fonataba =

Indonesian professional footballer

Liston Harry Fonataba
Personal information
- Full name: Liston Harry Fonataba
- Date of birth: 12 March 1984 (age 42)
- Place of birth: Yapen Islands, Indonesia
- Height: 1.67 m (5 ft 5 1/2 in)
- Position: Defender

Senior career*
Years	Team	Apps	(Gls)
2010–2016	Perseru Serui	117	(5)
- * Club domestic league appearances and goals

Liston Harry Fonataba (born 12 March 1984) is an Indonesian former professional footballer who played as a defender.
