= Yoewanto Setya Beny =

Indonesian footballer

Yoewanto Beny
Personal information
- Full name: Yoewanto Setya Beny
- Date of birth: 3 April 1993 (age 33)
- Place of birth: Malang, Indonesia
- Height: 1.73 m (5 ft 8 in)
- Position: Goalkeeper

Team information
- Current team: Garudayaksa
- Number: 23

Youth career
- 2009–2010: Deportivo Indonesia
- 2008–2012: Arema FC

Senior career*
Years	Team	Apps	(Gls)
2011–2013	Arema Indonesia	5	(0)
2015	Persipon Pontianak	0	(0)
2016–2017	Persiba Balikpapan	29	(0)
2018	PSS Sleman	6	(0)
2019	Badak Lampung	12	(0)
2020–2021	Barito Putra	1	(0)
2021–2022	Persija Jakarta	0	(0)
2022–2024	Sriwijaya	15	(0)
2023	→ Barito Putera (loan)	7	(0)
2024–2025	PSKC Cimahi	22	(0)
2025–	Garudayaksa	6	(0)

International career^{‡}
2008	Indonesia U16	2	(0)
2009–2011	Indonesia U19	2	(0)
- * Club domestic league appearances and goals as of 9 May 2026 ‡ National team caps and goals as of 8 November 2018

Yoewanto Setya Beny (born 3 April 1993) is an Indonesian professional footballer who plays as a goalkeeper for Super League club Garudayaksa.

== International career ==
In 2008, Beny represented the Indonesia U-16, in the 2008 AFC U-16 Championship.

== Honours ==
PSS Sleman

- Liga 2: 2018

Persija Jakarta

- Menpora Cup: 2021

Garudayaksa

- Championship: 2025–26
