= Franklin Rumbiak =

Indonesian footballer

Personal information
- Full name: Franklin Rumbiak
- Date of birth: 12 November 1989 (age 37)
- Place of birth: Biak Numfor, Indonesia
- Height: 1.67 m (5 ft 5 1/2 in)
- Position: Midfielder

Senior career*
Years	Team	Apps	(Gls)
2014–2017	Perseru Serui	42	(10)
- * Club domestic league appearances and goals as of 22:50, 12 September 2014 (UTC)

Franklin Rumbiak (born 12 November 1989) is an Indonesian footballer who plays as a midfielder.

== Career ==
=== Perseru Serui ===
On 18 May 2014, he scored his first goal for Perseru in a 1–1 draw against Persiba Bantul.
