= Khusnul Yuli =

Indonesian footballer

Personal information
- Full name: Khusnul Yuli Kurniawan
- Date of birth: 13 July 1978 (age 48)
- Place of birth: Malang, East Java, Indonesia
- Height: 1.71 m (5 ft 7 1/2 in)
- Positions: Midfielder; defender

Senior career*
Years	Team	Apps	(Gls)
1997–2000	Persema Malang	42	(0)
2001–2002	Arema Malang	33	(0)
2003–2006	Persik Kediri	57	(3)
2007–2008	Persebaya Surabaya	29	(0)
2009–2010	Arema Indonesia	27	(1)
2011–2013	Persepam Madura United	17	(0)
2013–2016	Persik Kediri	20	(0)
2017–2018	Persekam Metro	23	(0)
Total		248	(4)
- * Club domestic league appearances and goals

Khusnul Yuli Kurniawan (born 13 July 1978 in Malang, East Java) is an Indonesian former footballer.

== Honours ==
Persik Kediri

- Liga Indonesia Premier Division: 2003, 2006
