= Varney Pas Boakay =

Liberian footballer

Personal information
- Full name: Varney Pas Boakay
- Date of birth: January 16, 1983 (age 43)
- Place of birth: Monrovia, Liberia
- Height: 1.80 m (5 ft 11 in)
- Position: Striker

Senior career*
Years	Team	Apps	(Gls)
2002–2004	LPRC Oilers	57	(24)
2004–2006	Persigo Gorontalo	32	(13)
2006–2009	Persibo Bojonegoro	77	(16)
2009–2010	Persela Lamongan	28	(2)
2010–2011	Gresik United	27	(4)
2011–2012	Persiku Kudus	18	(1)
2012–2013	PSBI Blitar	19	(3)
2014–2015	PSBS Biak Numfor	12	(7)

International career
2003	Liberia	2	(0)
- * Club domestic league appearances and goals as of 12 February 2010

Varney Pas Boakay (born 16 January 1983) is a Liberian former footballer who plays as a striker. His former clubs include Persibo Bojonegoro and Persela Lamongan. With Persela, he played in the Indonesia Super League.
