= Yoksan Ama =

Indonesian professional footballer

Personal information
- Full name: Yoksan Ama
- Date of birth: 22 September 1986 (age 40)
- Place of birth: Indonesia
- Height: 1.67 m (5 ft 5 1/2 in)
- Position: Forward

Senior career*
Years	Team	Apps	(Gls)
2013–2018	Perseru Serui	41	(7)
- * Club domestic league appearances and goals

Yoksan Ama (born 22 September 1986) is an Indonesian professional footballer who currently plays as a forward.

== Career ==
=== Perseru Serui ===
Ama was part of the team that successfully got Perseru promoted to the Indonesia Super League for the first time in their history, after beating Persik Kediri by a penalty shoot-out in the 2013 Liga Indonesia Premier Division knockout stage semi-final.

Ama scored his first two goals in the Indonesia Super League in a match that ended 4–1 for Perseru Serui against Persepam Madura United on 2 February 2014.

== Honours ==
=== Club ===
Perseru Serui

Runner-up

- Liga Indonesia Premier Division: 2013
