= Marchelino Mandagi =

Indonesian footballer

Personal information
- Full name: Marchelino Abraham Mandagi
- Date of birth: 16 February 1990 (age 36)
- Place of birth: Tomohon, North Sulawesi, Indonesia
- Height: 1.79 m (5 ft 10 1/2 in)
- Positions: Defender; midfielder

Senior career*
Years	Team	Apps	(Gls)
2008–2009	Persisam Putra Samarinda	19	(0)
2010–2011	Bontang	30	(1)
2011–2013	Persiwa Wamena	37	(0)
2014–2018	Perseru Serui	31	(0)
Total		117	(1)
- * Club domestic league appearances and goals

Marchelino Mandagi (born 16 February 1990, in Tomohon) is an Indonesian former footballer.

== Club career statistics ==
Club performance			League		Cup		League Cup		Total	
Season	Club	League	Apps	Goals	Apps	Goals	Apps	Goals	Apps	Goals
Indonesia			League		Piala Indonesia		League Cup		Total	
2008–09	Persisam Putra Samarinda	Premier Division	19	0	-		-		19	0
2009–10	Bontang	Super League	14	1	5	0	-		19	1
2010–11	Bontang	Super League	16	0	-		-		16	0
2011–12	Persiwa Wamena	Super League	13	0	-		-		13	0
Total	Indonesia		62	1	5	0	-		67	1
Career total			62	1	5	0	-		67	1

== Honours ==
Persisam Putra Samarinda

- Liga Indonesia Premier Division: 2008–09
