= Robby Maruanaya =

Indonesian footballer and manager (died 2020)

Personal information
- Place of birth: Papua, Indonesia
- Date of death: 4 October 2020 (aged 70)
- Place of death: Jayapura, Indonesia
- Position: Defender

Senior career*
Years	Team	Apps	(Gls)
- Persipur Purwodadi
- Pelita Jaya

International career
- Indonesia

Managerial career
- PSBL Bandar Lampung
- Persiwa Wamena
- Persewar Waropen
- Persimi Sarmi
- 2014: Perseru Serui
- PS Freeport
- * Club domestic league appearances and goals

Robby Maruanaya (died 4 October 2020) was an Indonesian former footballer and manager who played as a defender.

== Playing career ==
During the 1970s and 1980s, Maruanaya played club football for Persipur Purwodadi. At international level, Maruanaya represented Indonesia during the 1980s, playing at the 1986 Asian Games in South Korea, whilst playing for Pelita Jaya.

== Managerial career ==
Following his playing career, Maruanaya moved into management. Following a spell at PSBL Bandar Lampung, Maruanaya managed Persiwa Wamena, Persewar Waropen and Persimi Sarmi. In 2014, following a short spell at Perseru Serui, Maruanaya was appointed manager of Divisi Tiga club PS Freeport.
