= Bilibig Dian Mahrus =

Indonesian footballer

Personal information
- Full name: Bilibig Dian Mahrus
- Date of birth: 27 March 1986 (age 40)
- Place of birth: Jember, Indonesia
- Height: 1.86 m (6 ft 1 in)
- Position: Defender

Senior career*
Years	Team	Apps	(Gls)
2009–2010	Persires Rengat	22	(0)
2010–2018	Perseru Serui	103	(0)
2018–2019	Semeru	15	(0)
- * Club domestic league appearances and goals

Bilibig Dian Mahrus (born 27 March 1986) is an Indonesian former footballer who plays as a defender.
