= Aliyudin Ali =

Indonesian footballer

Aliyudin
Personal information
- Full name: Aliyudin Ali
- Date of birth: 7 May 1980 (age 46)
- Place of birth: Cikeas, Bogor, Indonesia
- Height: 1.68 m (5 ft 6 in)
- Position: Forward

Youth career
- 1995–1998: PS Indocement Cirebon

Senior career*
Years	Team	Apps	(Gls)
1998–2000	PS Indocement Cirebon		
2000–2002	Persikabo Bogor	26	(14)
2002–2004	Pelita Krakatau Steel	50	(43)
2004–2007	Persikota Tangerang	85	(40)
2007–2011	Persija Jakarta	90	(38)
2011–2012	Persib Bandung	28	(5)
2012–2013	Sriwijaya	8	(1)
2013–2016	Persikabo Bogor	34	(12)
Total		321	(153)

International career
2003	Indonesia U23		
2004–2009	Indonesia	9	(0)
- * Club domestic league appearances and goals

Aliyudin Ali (born 7 May 1980) is an Indonesian former footballer. He normally plays as a forward.

His favourite player is Michael Owen. His favourite clubs are Real Madrid and Liverpool.

He is a lively and energetic player and the opposing defence often has difficulty guarding him.

== Performance in National Team ==
=== With U-23 Team ===
- 2003: Sea games

=== With Senior Team ===
- 2004: Asian Cup and Pre Asian Cup
- 2008: AFF Suzuki Cup

== Honours ==
=== Individual honors ===
- First Division Top Scorer (1): 2001
