= Cendrawasih Stadium =

Stadium in Papua, Indonesia

- Location in Western New Guinea and Indonesia Cendrawasih Stadium (Indonesia)
- Address: Jl. Sisingamangaraja, Samofa, Biak, Biak Numfor Regency, Papua 98111; Indonesia
- Location: Biak Numfor Regency, Papua
- Coordinates: 1.178731°S 136.086986°E
- Owner: Biak Numfor Regency Government
- Operator: Biak Numfor Regency Government
- Capacity: 15,000
- Surface: Grass field
- Field size: 130m x 74m

Construction
- Opened: 1980; 46 years ago
- Renovated: 2011

Tenants
- PSBS Biak (1990–present); Biak United

Cendrawasih Stadium is a main sports venue of Biak Numfor Regency, Papua. This stadium has a seating capacity of 15,000. It is the home stadium of Liga 1 club PSBS Biak and Liga 3 club Biak United.
