= PSBS Biak =

Association football team in Indonesia

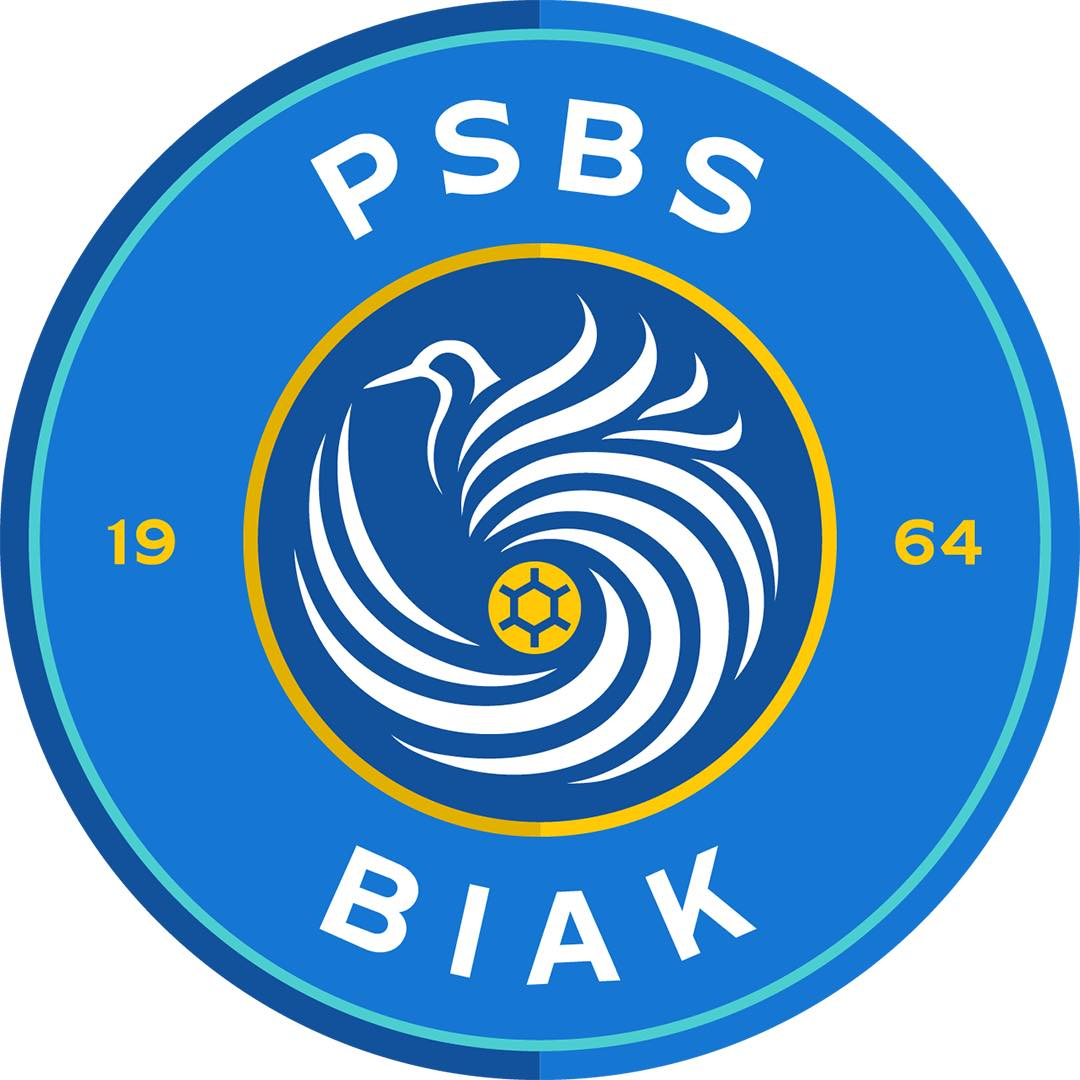
- Full name: Persatuan Sepakbola Biak dan Sekitarnya
- Nickname: Badai Pasifik (The Pacific Typhoon)
- Short name: BIK
- Founded: 12 December 1964; 61 years ago
- Ground: Cendrawasih Stadium
- Capacity: 15,000
- Owner: PT Sepak Bola Biak Jaya
- Head coach: Miskardi
- League: Championship
- 2025–26: Super League, 18th of 18 (relegated)
Home colours	Away colours

Persatuan Sepakbola Biak dan Sekitarnya, commonly known as PSBS Biak, is an Indonesian professional football club based in Biak Numfor Regency, Papua. The club currently competes in the Championship next season, following relegation from the 2025–26 Super League.

== History ==
PSBS Biak was founded on 12 December 1964. PSBS Biak was not as fortunate as other Papuan clubs such as Persipura Jayapura, Persiwa Wamena, Persidafon Dafonsoro, Persiram Raja Ampat, and Perseru Serui. They were promoted to Premier Division in the 2011–12 season after winning the Liga Indonesia First Division in the 2010 Liga Indonesia First Division.

After eight seasons surviving in the second-tier competition, PSBS Biak had to be taken over by rival, Persewar Waropen, who successfully made history by qualifying for the second round of 2019 Liga 2.

PSBS Biak managed go through to the semi-finals of 2023–24 Liga 2 season. They defeated Persiraja Banda Aceh on 5–1 on aggregate to go through to the final. Thus PSBS Biak secured a promotion for the first time in history to the Liga 1. In the final match which was held over two legs, PSBS managed to become champion after beating Semen Padang 3–0 in the home match in the first leg and the away match again won 0–3 with a 6–0 aggregate win. Alexsandro managed to win two individual awards at once, "Top Scorer" with 19 goals and being the "Best Player" too.

Competing in the 2025–26 Super League, PSBS recorded their biggest home defeat in history by losing 0–7 to Malut United on 28 April 2026 at the Maguwoharjo Stadium, Sleman. They were relegated to the Championship after losing 4–0 to Persebaya Surabaya in matchday 31.

== Players ==
=== Current squad ===
As of 16 September 2026

Note: Flags indicate national team as defined under FIFA eligibility rules; some limited exceptions apply. Players may hold more than one non-FIFA nationality.

No.	Pos.	Nation	Player
3	DF	IDN	Gesang Suparman
11	DF	IDN	Wafi Naufal
12	MF	IDN	Alfan Tri
14	MF	IDN	Ians Rumbewas
19	MF	IDN	Fajar Galih
20	GK	IDN	Ilham Radhitya
22	GK	IDN	Leo Mosey
23	MF	IDN	Pasha Susilo
27	MF	IDN	Rahel Aji
29	MF	IDN	Naufal Al Ghani
31	DF	IDN	Raissa Oktavian
32	DF	IDN	Patrias Rumere (captain)

No.	Pos.	Nation	Player
33	DF	IDN	Keanu Zidan
37	DF	IDN	Bintang Angkasa
44	DF	IDN	Moses Madjar
46	FW	IDN	Thobias Solossa
49	DF	IDN	Syathir Alwansyah
66	DF	IDN	Gavin Ganendra
77	FW	IDN	Fathan Nabil
89	DF	IDN	Jenar Maheswara
90	MF	IDN	Nelson Alom
94	FW	IDN	Heri Susanto
98	FW	IDN	Samuel Gwijangge

== Supporters ==
PSBS's supporters are called Napi Bongkar, with yellow and green as their identity. Napi Bongkar is one of the biggest football club supporters in Papua.

== Staff ==
Position	Name
Manager	(Indonesia) Alexander Yarangga
Assistant manager	(Indonesia) Bryan M.S. Anwar
Director	(Indonesia) Freddy Montolalu
Head coach	(Indonesia) Miskardi
Assistant coach	(Indonesia) Dani Syahru
Goalkeeping coach	(Indonesia) Gary A.S. Anwar
Doctor	(Indonesia) Lintang A.A. Handayani
Physiotherapist	(Indonesia) Puspa Adelia
Masseur	(Indonesia) Imanda Haristiarto
Kitman	(Indonesia) James A. Woof
Security officer	(Indonesia) Hasan H. Al-Habsyi
Photographer	(Indonesia) Hugo Erick E.B.G. Papare
Secretary	(Indonesia) Yuberty H. Karwur

== Honours ==
- Liga 2 (second-tier)
  - Champion (1): 2023–24
- Liga Indonesia First Division (third-tier)
  - Champion (1): 2010–11

== Statistics ==
Note: Since 2010 season

=== Recent history ===
Champions	Runners-up	Third place	Promoted	Relegated

Season	Division	Position	Pld	W	D	L	GF	GA	Pts	Cup	AFC/AFF competition(s)	
2010	FD	1st	8	7	1	0	17	3	22	–	–	–
2011–12	PD	5th (Note: Group 2 in First Round.)	20	7	8	5	27	22	29	–	–	–
2013	PD	2nd (Note: Group 2 in Second Round.)	20	10	4	6	32	22	34	–	–	–
2014	PD	3rd (Note: Group 8 in First Round.)	12	7	2	3	17	12	23	–	–	–
2015	PD	failed the verification process									–	–
2016	ISC-B	not participating									–	–
2017	L2	4th (Note: Group C in Second Round.)	16	5	5	6	18	22	20	–	–	–
2018	L2	9th (Note: East Region in First Round.)	22	7	5	10	28	32	26	First round	–	–
2019	L2	9th (Note: East Region in First Round.)	20	6	6	8	14	21	24	–	–	–
2020	L2	season declared void									–	–
2021–22	L2	5th (Note: Group D in First Round.)	10	3	3	4	9	9	12	–	–	–
2022–23	L2	season not finished									–	–
2023–24	L2	1st	18	13	3	2	33	12	42	–	–	–
2024–25	L1	9th	34	13	9	12	44	47	48	–	–	–
2025–26	SL	18th	34	4	6	24	31	95	18	–	–	–
2026–27	CH	TBD	27	0	0	0	0	0	0	–	–	–

=== Season by season ===
Season	Tier	Division	Place	Piala Indonesia
2005	4	TD	4th	–
2006	3	SD	Second round	–
2007–08	3	SD	Second round	–
2008–09	3	FD	First round	–
2009–10	3	FD	Second round	–
2010	3	FD	1st	–
2011–12	2	PD	5th (1R: Group 2)	–
2013	2	PD	2nd (2R: Group 2)	–
2014	2	PD	3rd (1R: Group 8)	–
2015	2	PD	not participating	–
2016	2	ISC-B	not participating	–
2017	2	L2	4th (2R: Group C)	–
2018	2	L2	9th (1R: East Region)	First Round
2019	2	L2	9th (1R: East Region)	First Round
2020	2	L2	declared void	–
2021–22	2	L2	5th (1R: Group D)	–
2022–23	2	L2	not finished	–
2023–24	2	L2	1st	–
2024–25	1	L1	9th	–
2025–26	1	SL	18th	–
2026–27	2	CH		–

Current league

- 8 seasons in Championship
- 2 seasons in Super League

Defunct league

- 4 season in Premier Division (as second tier)
- 3 season in First Division (as third tier)
- 2 season in Second Division (as third tier)
- 1 season in Third Division (as fourth tier)
