= Akbar Rasyid =

Indonesian footballer

Personal information
- Full name: Akbar Rasyid
- Date of birth: 1 January 1983 (age 43)
- Place of birth: Makassar, Indonesia
- Height: 1.69 m (5 ft 6 1/2 in)
- Position: Midfielder

Senior career*
Years	Team	Apps	(Gls)
2004–2005	PSM Makassar		(1)
2005–2006	Persmin Minahasa		(3)
2007–2008	Arema Malang	20	(0)
2008–2012	Persisam Putra Samarinda	110	(2)
2014	Persebaya DU (Bhayangkara)	3	(0)
2014	→ Pusamania Borneo F.C. (loan)	6	(0)
2015	Persela Lamongan	0	(0)
- * Club domestic league appearances and goals

Akbar Rasyid (born 1 January 1983) is an Indonesian former footballer who plays as a midfielder.

== Honours ==
Persisam Putra Samarinda

- Liga Indonesia Premier Division: 2008–09
