= Faris Aditama =

Indonesian association football player

Personal information
- Full name: Faris Aditama
- Date of birth: 19 February 1988 (age 38)
- Place of birth: Kediri, Indonesia
- Height: 1.75 m (5 ft 9 in)
- Position: Winger

Youth career
- 2006–2007: Arema Malang
- 2007–2010: Persik Kediri

Senior career*
Years	Team	Apps	(Gls)
2010–2014	Persik Kediri	55	(14)
2015–2017	Persepam Madura Utama	33	(12)
2018	Martapura	11	(1)
2018	Madura	9	(1)
2019–2026	Persik Kediri	104	(6)
- * Club domestic league appearances and goals as of 23 May 2026

Faris Aditama (born 19 February 1988) is an Indonesian professional footballer who plays as a winger.

== Club career ==
=== Persik Kediri ===
He was signed for Persik Kediri to play in Liga 2 in the 2019 season. On 25 November 2019 Persik successfully won the 2019 Liga 2 Final and was promoted to Liga 1, after defeating Persita Tangerang 3–2 at the Kapten I Wayan Dipta Stadium, Gianyar.

== Honours ==
=== Club ===
Persik Kediri

- Liga 2: 2019
