= Tonny Roy Ayomi =

Indonesian professional footballer

Personal information
- Full name: Tonny Roy Ayomi
- Date of birth: 2 August 1992 (age 34)
- Place of birth: Indonesia
- Height: 1.68 m (5 ft 6 in)
- Position: Midfielder

Senior career*
Years	Team	Apps	(Gls)
2014–2018	Perseru Serui	102	(6)
- * Club domestic league appearances and goals as of 11 November 2018

Tonny Roy Ayomi (born 2 August 1992) is an Indonesian professional footballer who plays as a midfielder.
