= Bijahil Chalwa =

Indonesian association footballer

Personal information
- Full name: Bijahil Chalwa
- Date of birth: 30 November 1990 (age 35)
- Place of birth: Bojonegoro, Indonesia
- Height: 1.72 m (5 ft 8 in)
- Position: Forward

Senior career*
Years	Team	Apps	(Gls)
2010–2012	Persibo Bojonegoro	18	(2)
2012–2013	Persikabo Bogor	22	(3)
2013	Persibo Bojonegoro	14	(1)
2014–2015	Persela Lamongan	23	(4)
2016	Bhayangkara	1	(0)
2016	PSS Sleman	5	(0)
2017	Persiba Balikpapan	24	(5)
2018	Barito Putera	5	(0)
2018–2019	→ Kalteng Putra (loan)	10	(0)
2019	Persik Kediri	2	(0)
2019	Sulut United	4	(0)
2020	Mitra Kukar	1	(0)
2021–2023	Persibo Bojonegoro	4	(7)
Total		133	(22)

Managerial career
- 2023–: Persibo Bojonegoro (Assistant coach)
- * Club domestic league appearances and goals

Bijahil Chalwa (born 30 November 1990) is an Indonesian former footballer.

== Club career ==
=== Persela Lamongan ===
He scored his first hattrick in a 3–0 win against Persebaya Surabaya on 10 February 2014.

== Honours ==
Persibo Bojonegoro

- Piala Indonesia: 2012
