= Cucu Hidayat =

Indonesian footballer

Personal information
- Full name: Cucu Hidayat
- Date of birth: 20 August 1983 (age 43)
- Place of birth: Bandung, Indonesia
- Height: 1.68 m (5 ft 6 in)
- Position: Midfielder

Youth career
- Propelat
- POPP
- PS Setia

Senior career*
Years	Team	Apps	(Gls)
2002–2004	Persikabo Bogor	22	(1)
2004–2006	Persikad Depok	24	(2)
2006–2008	Persib Bandung	23	(1)
2008–2009	Persita Tangerang	20	(3)
2009–2010	Persib Bandung	18	(1)
2010–2011	Persibo Bojonegoro	21	(0)
2010–2012	Persikabo Bogor	28	(0)
2012–2013	Sriwijaya	16	(0)
2013–2014	Persikabo Bogor	23	(0)
2014–2015	Persijap Jepara	24	(0)
2016–2017	Persikotas Tasikmalaya	15	(1)
Total		234	(9)
- * Club domestic league appearances and goals

Cucu Hidayat (born 20 August 1983) is an Indonesian former footballer who plays as a midfielder.
