= Firmansyah Aprillianto =

Indonesian footballer

Firmansyah
Personal information
- Full name: Firmansyah Aprillianto
- Date of birth: 9 April 1990 (age 36)
- Place of birth: Malang, East Java, Indonesia
- Height: 1.68 m (5 ft 6 in)
- Position: Midfielder

Youth career
- 2002–2008: Arema Academy
- 2008–2010: Arema FC U-21

Senior career*
Years	Team	Apps	(Gls)
2009–2012	Arema Indonesia	121	(7)
2010–2011	→ Persekam Metro (loan)	17	(1)
2012–2015	Persebaya DU	29	(6)
Total		167	(14)
- * Club domestic league appearances and goals

Firmansyah Aprillianto (born 9 April 1990 in Malang, East Java) is an Indonesian former footballer who plays as a midfielder. Another incident came to light in 2013 but again this was just considered a rumour and fans ensured it would not tarnish his good name.
