= Eduard Văluță =

Moldovan footballer

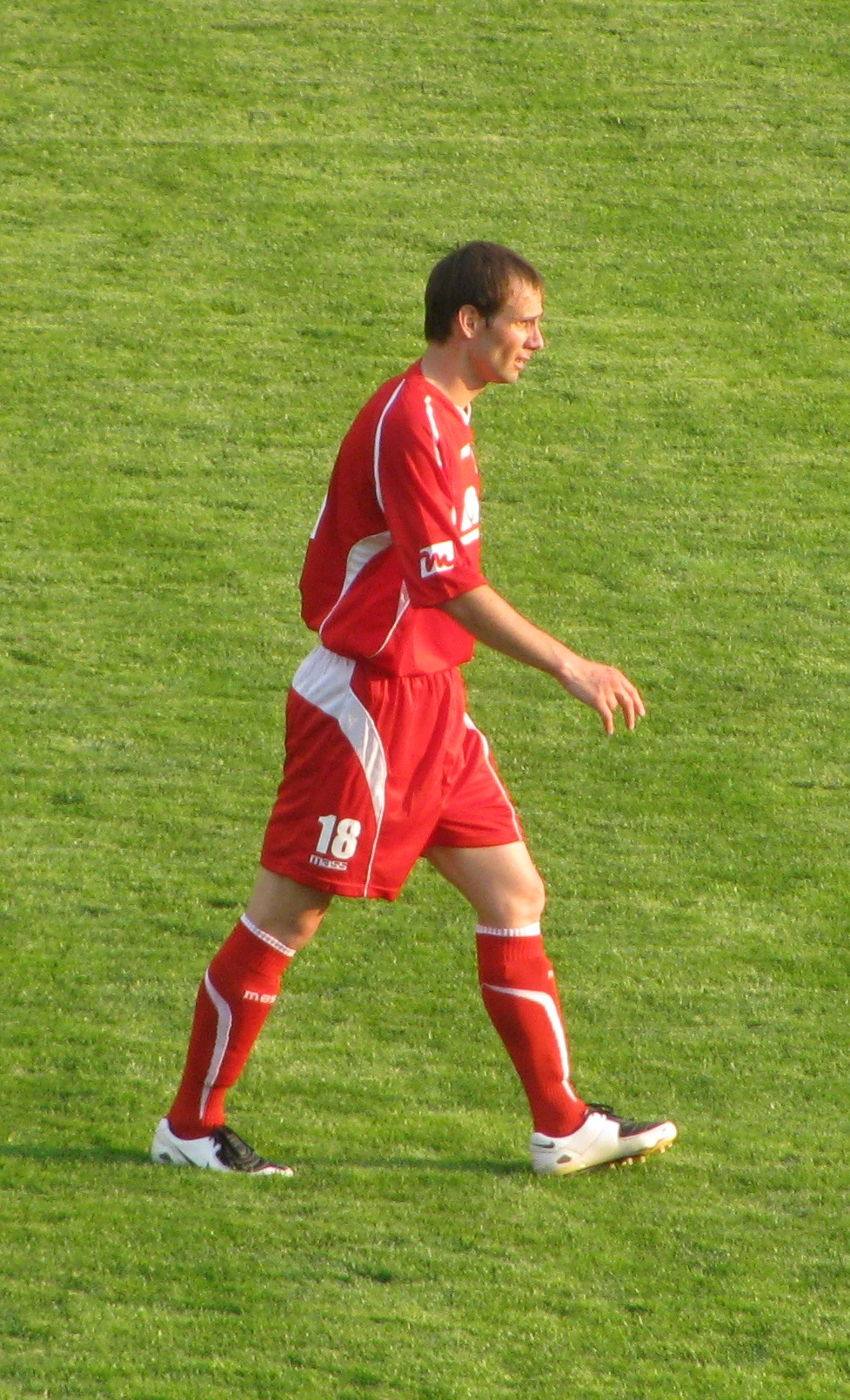

Personal information
- Full name: Eduard Văluță
- Date of birth: 9 April 1979 (age 47)
- Place of birth: Moldovan SSR
- Height: 1.85 m (6 ft 1 in)
- Position: Defender

Senior career*
Years	Team	Apps	(Gls)
1996–1997	Codru Călăraşi	11	(0)
1997–2000	Moldova Gaz Chișinău	33	(3)
2000–2001	Rostselmash Rostov-on-Don	0	(0)
2000–2001	→ Rostselmash-d Rostov-on-Don	14	(0)
2002–2004	Metalurh Zaporizhya	39	(4)
2004	Mykolaiv	16	(0)
2004	Torpedo-SKA Minsk	13	(0)
2005	Nistru Otaci	9	(0)
2005	Dinamo Brest	11	(0)
2006–2007	Alma-Ata	9	(1)
2007–2008	Naftovyk Okhtyrka	23	(2)
2009	Lokomotiv Astana	11	(1)
2010	→ Olimpia Bălți (loan)	9	(0)
2011–2013	Persikabo Bogor		
2014	Persepam MU	9	(2)
2014	Pusamania Borneo		

International career
2000–2001	Moldova U21	7	(0)
2003–2004	Moldova	4	(0)
- * Club domestic league appearances and goals

Eduard Văluță (born 9 April 1979) is a Moldovan former professional footballer who played as a defender.
