= Arthur Bonai =

Indonesian footballer

Personal information
- Full name: Arthur Barrios Bonai
- Date of birth: 3 August 1991 (age 35)
- Place of birth: Jayapura, Indonesia
- Height: 1.80 m (5 ft 11 in)
- Position: Midfielder

Senior career*
Years	Team	Apps	(Gls)
2011–2017	Perseru Serui	98	(17)
2018	Persija Jakarta	0	(0)
2018–2019	Perseru Serui	28	(2)
2019	PSIS Semarang	14	(0)
2019	Badak Lampung	13	(2)
2020–2021	TIRA-Persikabo	3	(0)
2021–2022	Bhayangkara	24	(2)
2022–2023	RANS Nusantara	9	(1)

International career
2019	Indonesia	2	(0)
- * Club domestic league appearances and goals as of 23 December 2022

Arthur Barrios Bonai (born 3 August 1992) is an Indonesian professional footballer who plays as a midfielder.

== Club career ==
=== Perseru Serui ===
He became one of the Perseru Serui players who called Alfred Riedl to follow the training camp of the Indonesia national football team on September 22–27, in Solo.

=== Persija Jakarta ===
On November 30, 2017, he signed a two-year contract with Persija Jakarta.

=== Return to Perseru Serui ===
In 2018, it was confirmed that Lerby would re-join Perseru Serui. He made his league debut on 31 March 2018 in a match against PSM Makassar. On 4 November 2018, Bonai scored his first goal against Mitra Kukar.

=== PSIS Semarang ===
He was signed for PSIS Semarang to play in Liga 1 in the 2019 season. Bonai made his league debut on 16 May 2019 in a match against Kalteng Putra at the Moch. Soebroto Stadium, Magelang.

=== Badak Lampung ===
In Middle season 2019, Bonai signed a year contract with Badak Lampung. He made his league debut on 19 September 2019 in a match against Kalteng Putra. On 18 December 2019, Bonai scored his first goal for Badak Lampung against Persija Jakarta in the 54th minute at the Sumpah Pemuda Stadium, Bandar Lampung.

=== TIRA-Persikabo ===
He was signed for TIRA-Persikabo to play in Liga 1 in the 2020 season. Bonai made his league debut on 2 March 2020 in a match against Arema at the Pakansari Stadium, Cibinong. This season was suspended on 27 March 2020 due to the COVID-19 pandemic. The season was abandoned and was declared void on 20 January 2021.

=== Bhayangkara ===
In 2019, Bonai signed a year contract with Bhayangkara. He made his league debut on 18 September 2021 in a match against Madura United. On 29 September 2021, Bonai scored his first goal for Bhayangkara against Persik Kediri in the 83rd minute at the Gelora Bung Karno Madya Stadium, Jakarta.

=== RANS Nusantara ===
He was signed for RANS Nusantara to play in Liga 1 in the 2022–23 season. On 23 July 2022, Bonai made his league debut by being starting player in a 3–2 loss match against Bali United at Kapten I Wayan Dipta Stadium.

== International career ==
He made his debut for the Indonesia against Myanmar on 25 March 2019.

== Career statistics ==
=== International appearances ===
As of 15 June 2019

Appearances and goals by national team and year
National team	Year	Apps	Goals
Indonesia	2019	2	0
Total		2	0

== Personal life ==
Arthur is the younger brother of fellow footballer, Titus Bonai.

== Honours ==
=== Club ===
Persija Jakarta

- Indonesia President's Cup: 2018
