= Suroso =

Indonesian footballer

Personal information
- Full name: Suroso
- Date of birth: 24 April 1981 (age 45)
- Place of birth: Sidoarjo, Indonesia
- Height: 1.78 m (5 ft 10 in)
- Position: Defender

Youth career
- 2000–2001: Pd. Sinar Mas Pangan

Senior career*
Years	Team	Apps	(Gls)
2001–2002	Persebaya Surabaya		
2002–2004	Deltras Sidoarjo		(1)
2004–2006	Persik Kediri		
2006–2007	PSBL Bandar Lampung		
2007–2009	Arema Malang	57	(2)
2009–2011	Persema Malang	35	(0)
2011–2014	Persela Lamongan	47	(0)
2014–2015	Arema Cronus	12	(0)
2016–2018	Bhayangkara	9	(0)
- * Club domestic league appearances and goals

Suroso (born Sidoarjo, East Java, 24 April 1981) is an Indonesian former footballer. He normally plays as a defender and is 178 cm tall. In 2006, he helped Persik Kediri win the Liga Indonesia Premier Division. He also played for Arema Malang in the 2007 AFC Champions League group stage, where he was sent off in a match against Bangkok University FC.

He has played with football clubs or teams with a home base in East Java, because he does not want to be far away from his family. Now, he stays in Lamongan and plays for club Persela Lamongan.

== Career ==
He signed with Arema Cronus on 9 December 2014.

== Honours ==
Persik Kediri

- Liga Indonesia Premier Division: 2006

Bhayangkara

- Liga 1: 2017
