= Cristiano Lopes =

Brazilian footballer (born 1978)

Personal information
- Full name: Cristiano Lopes Figueiredo
- Date of birth: 18 February 1978 (age 48)
- Place of birth: Rio de Janeiro, Brazil
- Height: 1.72 m (5 ft 7 1/2 in)
- Position: Striker

Youth career
- 1989–1995: America
- 1995–1997: Vasco da Gama
- 1997–2000: NAC Breda

Senior career*
Years	Team	Apps	(Gls)
2000–2001	Stuttgarter Kickers		
2001–2002	Uberlândia		
2002–2004	Persita Tangerang	28	(6)
2004–2005	Persim Maros	12	(3)
2005–2006	PSPS Pekanbaru	16	(4)
2006–2008	Pelita Jaya	50	(26)
2008–2009	Pahang FA		
2009–2010	PSIS Semarang	28	(5)
2010–2011	Deltras Sidoarjo	26	(12)
2011–2012	Sriracha	20	(9)
2012–2013	Krabi		
2013–2014	Persikabo Bogor	14	(5)
2014–2015	Pattaya United	12	(4)
- * Club domestic league appearances and goals

Cristiano Lopes Figueiredo (born 18 February 1978) is a Brazilian former footballer who plays as a striker.
