= Rasmoyo =

Indonesian footballer

Personal information
- Full name: Rasmoyo
- Date of birth: 18 June 1978 (age 48)
- Place of birth: Magelang, Indonesia
- Height: 1.70 m (5 ft 7 in)
- Positions: Midfielder; defender

Senior career*
Years	Team	Apps	(Gls)
2000–2004	Persema Malang	22	(3)
2004–2006	Persela Lamongan	14	(0)
2006–2008	Arema Malang	16	(1)
2008–2009	Persisam Putra Samarinda	30	(1)
2009–2010	Persikab Bandung	18	(0)
2010–2011	Persiba Balikpapan	12	(0)
2011–2013	Persidafon Dafonsoro	48	(4)
2013–2016	PSS Sleman	32	(2)
Total		192	(11)
- * Club domestic league appearances and goals

Rasmoyo (born 18 June 1978 in Magelang) is an Indonesian former footballer.

== Honours ==
Arema Malang

- Copa Indonesia: 2006

Persisam Putra Samarinda

- Liga Indonesia Premier Division: 2008–09
