= Oliver Makor =

Liberian footballer (born 1973)

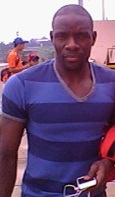
- Makor with Persija Jakarta

Personal information
- Full name: Oliver Paul Makor
- Date of birth: 9 October 1973 (age 53)
- Place of birth: Monrovia, Liberia
- Height: 1.68 m (5 ft 6 in)
- Position: Midfielder

Senior career*
| Years | Team | Apps | (Gls) |
| 1991–1992 | Black Star | | |
| 1992–1993 | Julius Berger | | |
| 1993–1994 | Canon Yaoundé | | |
| 1994–1996 | Grenoble | | |
| 1996–1997 | Tours | | |
| 1997–1999 | Limoges Foot | | |
| 1999–2001 | Proodeftiki | 46 | (13) |
| 2001–2002 | Egaleo | 18 | (6) |
| 2002–2008 | Ionikos | 165 | (45) |
| 2008–2009 | Panachaiki | 25 | (6) |
| 2010–2011 | Persija Jakarta | 22 | (18) |
| 2011–2012 | Persik Kediri | | |

International career
| 1993–2008 | Liberia | 33 | (9) |
- * Club domestic league appearances and goals

Oliver Makor (born 9 October 1973) is a Liberian former professional footballer who played as a midfielder. Over his career, he played for Persik Kediri, Proodeftiki, Egaleo and Ionikos, among others. Makor was also a member of the Liberia national team.

== Honors ==
Individual

- Piala Indonesia top goalscorer: 2012
