= Jean-Paul Boumsong =

Cameroonian footballer

Personal information
- Full name: Jean Paul Casimir E. Boumsong
- Date of birth: 20 May 1986 (age 40)
- Place of birth: Yaoundé, Cameroon
- Height: 1.86 m (6 ft 1 in)
- Position: Forward

Senior career*
Years	Team	Apps	(Gls)
2005–2006	Persitara Jakarta Utara	22	(5)
2006–2007	PSPS Pekanbaru	23	(6)
2007–2008	Persisam Putra Samarinda	24	(7)
2008–2009	Persikad Depok	28	(17)
2009–2010	Persipasi Bekasi	16	(13)
2010–2011	Persikabo Bogor	18	(9)
2011–2012	PSSB Bireuen	19	(12)
2013	Persiram Raja Ampat	29	(16)
2013–2014	Persebaya Bhayangkara	28	(21)
2014	Persik Kediri	18	(5)
2014–2016	Perseru Serui	12	(4)
Total		237	(115)
- * Club domestic league appearances and goals

Jean Paul Casimir E. Boumsong (born 20 May 1986) is a Cameroonian former footballer who plays as a forward.

== Honours ==
Individual

- Liga Indonesia Premier Division Best Player: 2013
- Liga Indonesia Premier Division Top Goalscorer: 2008–09 (shared), 2013 (shared)
