= Djaledjete Bedalbe =

Togolese footballer (born 1988)

Personal information
- Full name: Djaledjete Bedalbe
- Date of birth: 22 December 1988 (age 37)
- Place of birth: Lomé, Togo
- Height: 1.83 m (6 ft 0 in)
- Position: Centre-back

Senior career*
Years	Team	Apps	(Gls)
2013	Persebaya DU (Bhayangkara)		
2014	Persinga Ngawi		
2015–2016	Perseru Serui	18	(0)
- * Club domestic league appearances and goals

Djaledjete Bedalbe (born 22 December 1988) is a Togolese former footballer who played as a centre-back.

He joined the Persebaya DU in 2013 as a replacement for Gesio Carvalho. Together with the team, Djaledjete won the 2013 Liga Indonesia Premier Division.

== Honours ==
=== Clubs ===
Persebaya DU (Bhayangkara F.C.)

- Liga Indonesia Premier Division: 2013
