= Perseta Batara =

Association football team in Indonesia

- Full name: Persatuan Sepakbola Batara
- Nickname: Laskar Wongsorejo
- Founded: 1970; 56 years ago as Perseta Tulungagung; 2024; 2 years ago as Perseta Batara
- Ground: Guntur Wongsorejo Field
- Chairman: Anas Sulaiman
- Manager: Santoso
- Coach: Fendy Hendrawan
- League: Liga 4
- 2024–25: 3rd, in Group B (East Java zone)
- Website: www.persetatulungagung.com
Home colours	Away colours

Perseta Batara, stands for Persatuan Sepakbola Batara, formerly known as Perseta Tulungagung, is an Indonesian football club, based in Banyuwangi Regency, East Java, Indonesia. The club currently plays in Liga 4.

== Honours ==
- Liga Indonesia Third Division
  - Champion (1): 2006
