= Febri Setiadi Hamzah =

Indonesian footballer

Febri Hamzah
Personal information
- Full name: Febri Setiadi Hamzah
- Date of birth: 3 December 1984 (age 41)
- Place of birth: Padang, Indonesia
- Height: 1.84 m (6 ft 0 in)
- Position: Forward

Senior career*
| Years | Team | Apps | (Gls) |
| 2006–2009 | PSP Padang | | |
| 2008–2009 | → Semen Padang (loan) | 43 | (10) |
| 2011–2012 | Persih Tembilahan | 5 | (8) |
| 2013 | Persebaya DU (Bhayangkara) | 11 | (8) |
| 2014–2015 | Borneo | 25 | (13) |
| 2016 | Arema | 7 | (0) |
| 2017–2018 | Borneo | 8 | (2) |
| 2019 | PSMS Medan | 0 | (0) |
| 2021 | Serpong City | 5 | (0) |
- * Club domestic league appearances and goals as of 02:07, 8 April 2021 (UTC)

Febri Setiadi Hamzah (born 3 December 1984) is an Indonesian former footballer who last played as a forward for Liga 3 club Serpong City.
