= Srđan Lopičić =

Montenegrin footballer

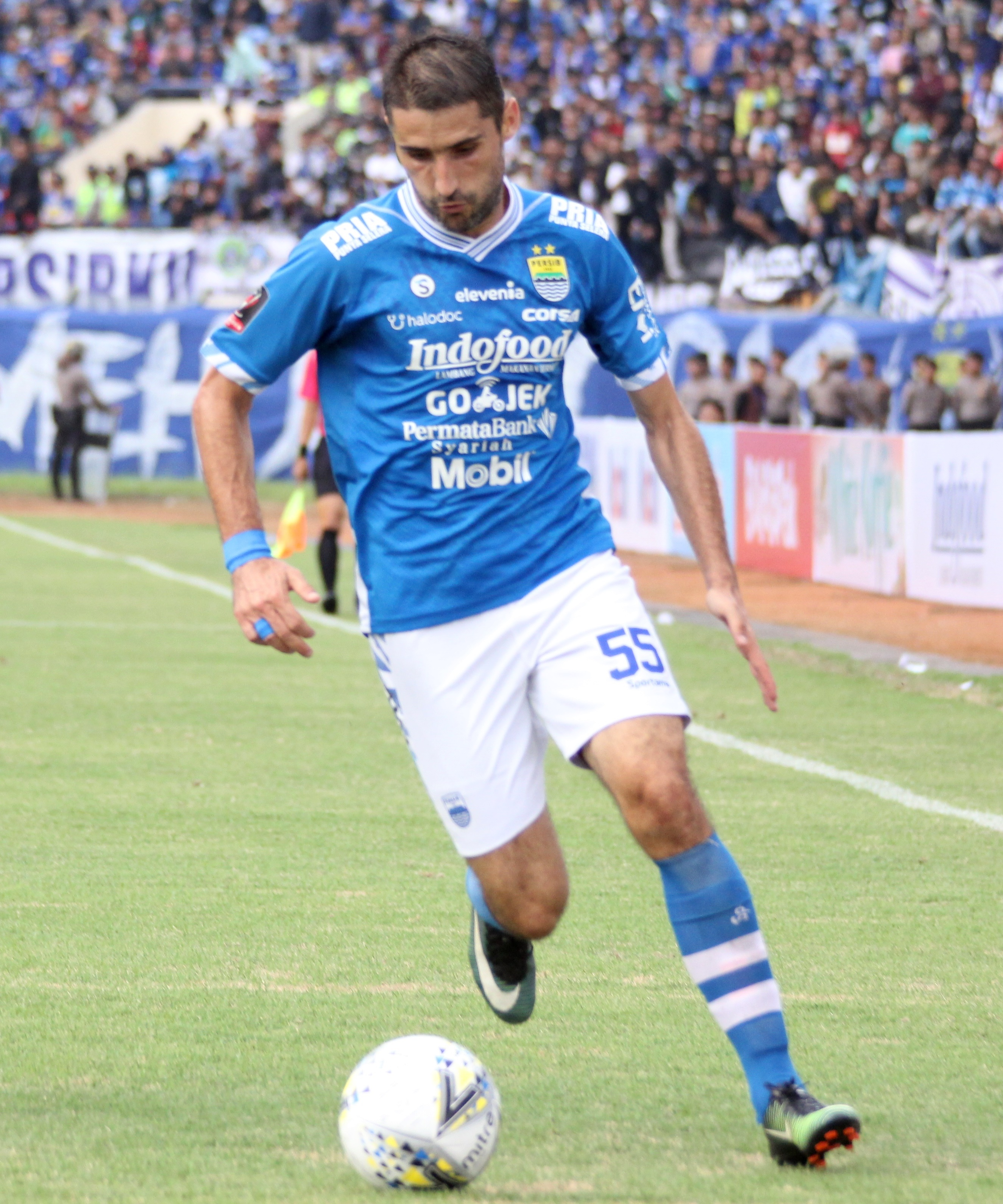
- Lopičić with Persib Bandung in 2019

Personal information
- Full name: Srđan Lopičić
- Date of birth: 20 November 1983 (age 42)
- Place of birth: Cetinje, SR Montenegro, SFR Yugoslavia
- Height: 1.81 m (5 ft 11 1/2 in)
- Position: Attacking midfielder

Senior career*
Years	Team	Apps	(Gls)
2000−2001	Lovćen	20	(4)
2001−2002	Crvena Stijena	21	(8)
2002−2004	Rudar Pljevlja	18	(12)
2004−2005	Hajduk Beograd	26	(9)
2005−2006	Mogren	21	(7)
2006−2007	Bokelj	23	(8)
2007−2008	Lovćen	22	(9)
2008−2010	Petrovac	54	(4)
2010	Olympic Charleroi	13	(4)
2011	Lovćen	19	(7)
2011−2012	Persisam Putra Samarinda	28	(4)
2013	Persebaya DU (Bhayangkara)	14	(4)
2014	Persela Lamongan	24	(7)
2015	Pusamania Borneo	12	(1)
2016	Arema Cronus	16	(2)
2016	South China	3	(0)
2017	Lovćen	15	(1)
2017	Persiba Balikpapan	16	(5)
2018	Borneo	18	(3)
2019	Persib Bandung	3	(3)
2021	Budva	7	(1)
Total		393	(103)

International career
2000–2005	Montenegro U-21	6	(0)

Managerial career
- 2019–2021: Budva (academy)
- 2021–2022: Borneo (assistant)
- 2023: Bokelj (assistant)
- 2023–2024: PSS Sleman (assistant)
- 2024–2025: Arsenal Tivat (assistant)
- 2025–: Kuala Lumpur City (assistant)
- * Club domestic league appearances and goals

Srđan Lopičić (born 20 November 1983) is a Montenegrin former professional footballer who played as an attacking midfielder.

== Club career ==
Lopičić played for several clubs in his native Montenegro before moving abroad to play in Indonesia for eight years. At the start of 2014, he joined Persela Lamongan from Persebaya DU and on December 20, 2014, he signed with Pusamania Borneo.

He was released by Persib Bandung in May 2019.

== Managerial career ==
=== Budva ===
In 2019–2021, Lopičić was the academy coach for the club Budva.

=== Borneo ===
In 2021–2022, he joined Borneo as an assistant coach to compete in the Liga 1 Indonesia.

=== Bokelj ===
On 2023, he returned to his country and became an assistant coach FK Bokelj.

=== PSS Sleman ===
At the end of 2023, he came to Indonesia again as an assistant coach of PSS Sleman until June 2024.

=== Arsenal Tivat ===
In 2024, Lopičić returned to his country where he was offered the position of assistant coach Arsenal Tivat.

=== Kuala Lumpur City ===
On 2025, Lopičić now returns to Southeast Asia again. Now he has returned under the auspices of Risto Vidaković with Kuala Lumpur City to face the 2025–26 Malaysia Super League.

== Honours ==
Petrovac

Winner

- Montenegrin Cup: 2008–09
