= Achmad Hisyam =

Indonesian footballer

Hisyam Tolle
Personal information
- Full name: Achmad Hisyam Tolle
- Date of birth: 7 January 1994 (age 32)
- Place of birth: Makassar, Indonesia
- Height: 1.78 m (5 ft 10 in)
- Position: Centre-back

Youth career
- 2012–2013: PSM Makassar

Senior career*
Years	Team	Apps	(Gls)
2014	Bhayangkara	2	(0)
2015–2016	Borneo	2	(0)
2016	→ Sriwijaya (loan)	3	(0)
2016	PSM Makassar	6	(0)
2017	Mitra Kukar	0	(0)
2017	Persiba Balikpapan	3	(0)
2017	PSS Sleman	11	(1)
2018	Borneo	11	(0)
2018	PSS Sleman	10	(2)
2019	PSIM Yogyakarta	14	(0)
Total		62	(3)

International career
2012	Indonesia U21	1	(0)
- * Club domestic league appearances and goals as of 3 August 2019

Achmad Hisyam Tolle (born 7 January 1994) is an Indonesian former footballer who plays as a centre-back.

== Honours ==
=== International ===
Indonesia U-21

- Hassanal Bolkiah Trophy runner-up: 2012
