= Babel United F.C. =

Indonesian football club

Babel United
- Full name: Bangka Belitung United Football Club
- Nicknames: Beruang Buas (Wild Bear)
- Founded: 1970; 56 years ago, as PS Bangka; 2017; 9 years ago, as PS Timah Babel; 2019; 7 years ago, as Babel United
- Dissolved: 2020 (merged with Muba United)
- Ground: Depati Amir Stadium
- Capacity: 15,000
- League: Liga 2
- 2019: Liga 2/1st round (West region), 8th
Home colours	Away colours	Third colours

Bangka Belitung United FC (commonly abbreviated as Babel United) was an Indonesian football club based in Pangkal Pinang, Bangka-Belitung Islands. The club played their home games at Depati Amir Stadium.

== History ==
Babel United was formed on 2019 after Aceh United and PS Timah Babel merged.
