= Persekam Malang =

Indonesian football club

Persekam
- Full name: Persatuan Sepakbola Kabupaten Malang
- Nicknames: Singo Putih (White Lions)
- Founded: 1970; 56 years ago
- Ground: Kahuripan Stadium
- Capacity: 3,000
- Owner: PSSI Malang Regency
- Chairman: M. Ukasyah Ali Murtadho
- Manager: Sasmito Budi Prastyo
- League: Liga 4
- 2024–25: Round of 32, (East Java zone)
Home colours	Away colours

Persatuan Sepakbola Kabupaten Malang, commonly known as Persekam, is an Indonesian football club based in Malang Regency, East Java. They currently compete in the Liga 4 East Java zone.

== History ==
They won 2009–10 Liga Indonesia First Division after beating Persemalra Southeast Maluku, 4–1 in penalty shootout at Singaperbangsa Stadium, Karawang. They got relegated to Liga 3 in 2017. This ended their seven-years stay in the Liga 2.

== Squad ==
The following is the squad for the event Indonesia Soccer Championship B 2016.

Note: Flags indicate national team as defined under FIFA eligibility rules; some limited exceptions apply. Players may hold more than one non-FIFA nationality.

No.	Pos.	Nation	Player
1	GK	IDN	Karyawan Yudik Raharjo
3	DF	IDN	Yuannugrah Awalta
4	DF	IDN	Rendi Budi Satriono
6	DF	IDN	Singgi Pitono
7	FW	IDN	Indra Cahya Andika
8	MF	IDN	Joko Slamet
9	FW	IDN	Andrianto
10	MF	IDN	Luxi Ariawan
11	FW	IDN	Setyo Adhi Prastowo
12	MF	IDN	Muh Amirul Bukhori
13	FW	IDN	Dwi Prasetyo
14	MF	IDN	Pendik Primadimanto
15	DF	IDN	Mohamad Yasin

No.	Pos.	Nation	Player
16	MF	IDN	Supriyadi
17	MF	IDN	Muh. Asni Fitrian
18	DF	IDN	Nanda Bagus Nugroho
20	GK	IDN	Effendi Dwi Ahyono
21	MF	IDN	Dwi Aditya Riski
22	DF	IDN	Tria Wida Wandani
23	MF	IDN	Nur Akbar Jawara Munir
26	DF	IDN	Achmad Soleh
29	DF	IDN	Gedhong Tangguh Pambudi
30	GK	IDN	Muh. Samsul Baqtiar

=== Management ===
- Coach Choirul Huda
- Assistant coach: Beny Wahyudi
- Manager: Made Arya
- Team treasurer: Slamet Suryono

== Honours ==
- Liga Indonesia First Division
  - Champion (1): 2009–10

== Logo history ==
Persekam Metro FC (2009–2025)
