= Badak Lampung F.C. =

Association football team in Indonesia

Badak Lampung
- Full name: Badak Lampung Football Club
- Nickname: Laskar Saburai (Saburai Warriors)
- Short name: BDL, BLFC
- Founded: 1970; 56 years ago (as Perseru Serui); 1 May 2019; 7 years ago (as Badak Lampung FC)
- Dissolved: 2023
- Ground: Sumpah Pemuda Stadium
- Capacity: 25,000
- Coach: Rudy William Keltjes
- League: Liga 4
- 2021: Liga 2, 1st round (Group B), 6th (relegated)
Home colours	Away colours	Third colours

Badak Lampung Football Club, commonly known as BLFC, was an Indonesian football club based in Bandar Lampung, Lampung. Their homebase was Sumpah Pemuda Stadium.

== History ==
The club was initially established in 1970 as Perseru Serui. In 2010, the club gained promotion to the Premier Division after finishing as the fourth-ranked Liga Indonesia First Division.

In 2013, Perseru achieved its dream to compete at the highest football competition in Indonesia, Indonesia Super League after successfully stepping into the Premier Division Final 2013 season.

In March 2019, Perseru was bought by a businessman in Lampung, since all clubs in Lampung were only competing in third tier league. No clubs in Lampung competed in Liga 1 for decades. Therefore, the club's home base was moved to Lampung, and the club's name was changed from Perseru Serui to Badak Lampung FC. However, they only competed for a year (five years overall) in 2019 Liga 1, were relegated to Liga 2 for 2020 season, and then to Liga 3 for 2022 season.

Badak Lampung disbanded after their last match in the 2021 Liga 2 season.

== Sponsorship ==
- Sunpride
- Indofood
- M-150
- Kredit Plus

=== Kit supplier ===
- Veldome Sport (2012)
- Injers (2015)
- Junior Sport (2017)
- Noij Sportwear (2018)
- Made by Club (2019)
- MAR10 Apparel (2020)
- Adhoc Apparel (2021−2022)

== Stadiums ==
- Marora Stadium (2012–2019)
- Sumpah Pemuda Stadium (2019–2023)

== Season-by-season records ==
As Perseru Serui

Season	League/Division	Tms.	Pos.	Piala Indonesia	AFC competition(s)		ASEAN Club Championship
2008–09	Second Division	82	First round	–	–	–	–
2009–10	First Division	60	4	–	–	–	–
2010–11	Premier Division	39	12th, Group 3	–	–	–	–
2011–12	Premier Division	22	6th, Group 2	–	–	–	–
2013	Premier Division	38	2	–	–	–	–
2014	Indonesia Super League	22	8th, East division	–	–	–	–
2015	Indonesia Super League	18	did not finish	–	–	–	–
2016	Indonesia Soccer Championship A	18	11	–	–	–	–
2017	Liga 1	18	15	–	–	–	–
2018	Liga 1	18	14	Round of 16	–	–	–

As Badak Lampung

Season	League/Division	Tms.	Pos.	Piala Indonesia	AFC competition(s)		ASEAN Club Championship
2019	Liga 1	18	16	–	–	–	–
2020	Liga 2	24	did not finish	–	–	–	–
2021–22	Liga 2	24	6th, Group B	–	–	–	–

== Honours ==
- Liga Indonesia Premier Division
  - Runners-up (1): 2013

== Coaching staff ==
Position	Name
Manager Team	(Indonesia) Henry Arifianto
Head coach	(Indonesia) Rudy William Keltjes
Technical coach	(Indonesia) Fachmi Amiruddin
Goalkeeper Coach	(Indonesia) Agus Triono
Fitness Coach	(Indonesia) Ananto Nurhani
