= 2012 Piala Indonesia =

- 2012 Piala Indonesia logo

Tournament details
- Country: Indonesia
- Dates: 27 March – 14 July 2012
- Teams: 40

Final positions
- Champions: Persibo Bojonegoro
- Runners-up: Semen Padang

Tournament statistics
- Matches played: 77
- Goals scored: 171 (2.22 per match)
- Top goal scorer(s): (Liberia) Oliver Makor (6 goals)

The 2012 Piala Indonesia was the sixth edition of Piala Indonesia, the nationwide football cup tournament in Indonesia, involving professional clubs from Indonesian Premier League and Premier Division. Sriwijaya was the tournament's defending champions. However, the team did not join Piala Indonesia that season due to being one of the Indonesia Super League teams.

Persibo Bojonegoro of East Java won the championship after defeating Semen Padang of West Sumatra in the final.

The cup winner qualified for the 2013 AFC Cup.

== Regulation ==
Each tie in every round, apart from the final, was played over two legs, with each team playing one leg at home. The team with the higher aggregate score over the two legs progressed to the next round. If aggregate scores finished level, then the team that scored more goals away from home over the two legs progressed. If away goals were also equal, 30 minutes of extra time were played. If there were goals scored during extra time and the aggregate score is still level, the visiting team qualified by virtue of more away goals scored. If no goals were scored during extra time, there was a penalty shootout after extra time.

== Team allocation ==
40 teams participated in the 2012 Piala Indonesia from Indonesian Premier League and Indonesian Premier Division, the top two flights of the Indonesian football league system.

- Indonesian Premier League had 12 teams
- Indonesian Premier Division had 28 teams

=== Distribution ===
	Teams entering in this round	Teams advancing from previous round
First round (24 teams)	24 teams from Indonesian Premier Division	
Second round (24 teams)	4 teams from Indonesian Premier Division get bye; 8 teams from Indonesian Premier League	12 winners from the first round
Third round (16 teams)	4 team from Indonesian Premier League get bye	12 winners from the second round
Quarter-finals		8 winners from the third round
Semi-finals		4 winners from the quarter-finals
Final		2 winners from the semi-finals

== First round ==
The first leg matches were played on 27–28 March and the second leg on 4 April 2012.

Team 1	Agg.	Team 2	1st leg	2nd leg
Persitara North Jakarta	3 – 0 (wo)	PS Bengkulu	3 – 0	–
Persikota Tangerang	1 – 3	Persikabo Bogor	1 – 0	0 – 3
PSBL Langsa	Cancelled	PSSB Bireuen	–	–
Persikab Bandung	2 – 1	PSP Padang	1 – 0	1 – 1
Persepar Palangkaraya	3 – 3 (a)	PSIS Semarang	3 – 2	0 – 1
PSCS Cilacap	2 – 6	Persik Kediri	2 – 1	0 – 5
PSIR Rembang	2 – 3	PPSM Magelang	2 – 2	0 – 1
Persis Solo	5 – 5 (a)	PSS Sleman	3 – 1	2 – 4
Persbul Buol	3 – 0 (wo)	Persemalra Southeast Maluku	3 – 0	–
Madiun Putra	3 – 0	Persires Bali Devata	1 – 0	2 – 0
Persewangi Banyuwangi	1 – 2	Persipro Probolinggo	1 – 1	0 – 1
PSBI Blitar	Cancelled	Gresik United	–	–

=== First leg ===
28 March 2012

Persitara North Jakarta	3 – 0 Awarded	PS Bengkulu

Tugu Stadium, Jakarta

27 March 2012
16:15 UTC+7

Persikota Tangerang	1 – 0	Persikabo Bogor
Anam 12'	Report

Badak Stadium, Pandeglang

28 March 2012

PSBL Langsa	v	PSSB Bireuen

Langsa Stadium, Langsa

27 March 2012

Persikab Bandung	1 – 0	PSP Padang
Maulana 59'	Report

Si Jalak Harupat Stadium, Bandung

28 March 2012
15:30 UTC+7

Persepar Palangkaraya	3 – 2	PSIS Semarang
Pongky 43', 69'; Panambunan 59'	Report	Barques 17'; Anderson 32'

Tuah Pahoe Stadium, Palangkaraya

27 March 2012
15:30 UTC+7

PSCS Cilacap	2 – 1	Persik Kediri
Batoum 26'; Taryono 55'	Report	Da Silva 76'

Wijayakusuma Stadium, Cilacap

28 March 2012

PSIR Rembang	2 – 2	PPSM Magelang
Lenglolo 41', 57'	Report	Noor 12'; Yulianto 87'

Krida Stadium, Rembang

27 March 2012
16:00 UTC+7

Persis Solo	3 – 1	PSS Sleman
Rocha 4'; Ndubuisi 33'; Ferianto 49'	Report	Nanda 15'

Manahan Stadium, Surakarta

27 March 2012

Persbul Buol	3 – 0 Awarded	Persemalra Southeast Maluku

Kuonoto Stadium, Buol

27 March 2012
19:15 UTC+7

Madiun Putra	1 – 0	Persires Bali Devata
Wendik 80'	Report

Wilis Stadium, Madiun

28 March 2012

Persewangi Banyuwangi	1 – 1	Persipro Probolinggo
Da Silva 84' (pen.)	Report	Muril 72'

Diponegoro Stadium, Banyuwangi

28 March 2012

PSBI Blitar	v	Gresik United

Gelora Supriyadi Stadium, Blitar

=== Second leg ===
4 April 2012

PS Bengkulu	v	Persitara North Jakarta

Semarak Stadium, Bengkulu

4 April 2012

Persikabo Bogor	3 – 0	Persikota Tangerang
Suharlan 14'; Rojali 80'; Sopian 84'	Report

Persikabo Stadium, Cibinong

4 April 2012

PSSB Bireuen	v	PSBL Langsa

Cot Gapu Stadium, Bireuen

4 April 2012

PSP Padang	1 – 1	Persikab Bandung
Ferdi 85'	Report	Maulana 49'

Agus Salim Stadium, Padang

4 April 2012

PSIS Semarang	1 – 0	Persepar Palangkaraya
Anderson 45'	Report

Jatidiri Stadium, Semarang

4 April 2012

Persik Kediri	5 – 0	PSCS Cilacap
Makor 3' (pen.), 8' (pen.); Adhitama 23'; Mariawan 32'; Susanto 83'	Report

Brawijaya Stadium, Kediri

4 April 2012

PPSM Magelang	1 – 0	PSIR Rembang
Josiah Seton 75' (pen.)	Report

Madya Stadium, Magelang

4 April 2012

PSS Sleman	4 – 2 (a.e.t.)	Persis Solo
Handoko 22'; Marwan 42'; Nasution 78' orock 92'	Report	Rocha 60'; Alfian 100'

Maguwoharjo Stadium, Sleman

4 April 2012

Persemalra Southeast Maluku	v	Persbul Buol

Maren Stadium, Tual

4 April 2012

Persires Bali Devata	0 – 2	Madiun Putra
	Report	Agus Y. 30'; Eka 87'

I Wayan Dipta Stadium, Gianyar

4 April 2012

Persipro Probolinggo	1 – 0	Persewangi Banyuwangi
Junaedi 17'	Report

Bayu Angga Stadium, Probolinggo

4 April 2012

Gresik United	v	PSBI Blitar

Petrokimia Stadium, Gresik

== Second round ==
The first leg matches were played on 11 April and the second legs on 18 April 2012.

Team 1	Agg.	Team 2	1st leg	2nd leg
Persitara Jakarta Utara	1 – 2	Pro Duta FC	0 – 0	1 – 2
Persikabo Bogor	1 – 3	Persiraja Banda Aceh	0 – 0	1 – 3
Persikab Bandung	0 – 4	PSLS Lhokseumawe	0 – 1	0 – 3
PSIS Semarang	6 – 4	Bontang FC	4 – 0	2 – 4
Persik Kediri	3 – 0	Persijap Jepara	2 – 0	1 – 0
Persipasi Bekasi	0 – 3(wo)	PPSM Magelang	0 – 3	–
Persis Solo	4 – 4 (a)	Jakarta FC 1928	2 – 1	2 – 3
Perseman Manokwari	3 – 0(wo)	Persbul Buol	3 – 0	–
Madiun Putra FC	2 – 5	PSM Makassar	1 – 1	1 – 4
Persipro Probolinggo	0 – 6	Arema Indonesia	0 – 3	0 – 3(wo)

=== First leg ===
11 April 2012

Persitara Jakarta Utara	0 – 0	Pro Duta FC
	Report

Tugu Stadium, Jakarta

11 April 2012

Persikabo Bogor	0 – 0	Persiraja Banda Aceh
	Report

Persikabo Stadium, Cibinong

11 April 2012

Persikab Bandung	0 – 1	PSLS Lhokseumawe
	Report	Raul 83'

Si Jalak Harupat Stadium, Bandung

10 April 2012

PSIS Semarang	4 – 0	Bontang FC
Siregar 63' (pen.)	Report

Jatidiri Stadium, Semarang

17 April 2012

Persik Kediri	2 – 0	Persijap Jepara
Makor 41'; Mariawan 89'	Report

Brawijaya Stadium, Kediri

11 April 2012

Persipasi Bekasi	0 – 3 Awarded	PPSM Magelang
	Report

Patriot Stadium, Bekasi

11 April 2012

Persis Solo	2 – 1	Jakarta FC 1928
Rocha 58', 64'	Report	De Porras 39'

Manahan Stadium, Surakarta

11 April 2012

Perseman Manokwari	3 – 0 Awarded	Persbul Buol
	Report

Sanggeng Stadium, Manokwari

12 April 2012

Madiun Putra FC	1 – 1	PSM Makassar
Wibowo 23'	Report	Fadly 90+3'

Wilis Stadium, Madiun

14 April 2012

Persipro Probolinggo	0 – 3	Arema Indonesia
	Report	Jati 16'; Musafri 25'; Amiruddin 55'

Bayu Angga Stadium, Probolinggo

=== Second leg ===
18 April 2012

Pro Duta FC	2 – 1	Persitara Jakarta Utara
Rahmad 21'; Soldevilla 90'	Report	Pena 66'

Baharuddin Siregar Stadium, Deli Serdang

18 April 2012

Persiraja Banda Aceh	3 – 1	Persikabo Bogor
Dillah 13'; Angga 23'; Yudi 49'	Report	Pepito 78'

Harapan Bangsa Stadium, Banda Aceh

18 April 2012

PSLS Lhokseumawe	3 – 0	Persikab Bandung
Raul 33'; Sulaiman 37', 74'	Report

Tunas Bangsa Stadium, Lhokseumawe

18 April 2012

Bontang FC	4 – 2	PSIS Semarang
Poluakan 35'; Damasela 54'; Fukusawa 80'; Setiawan 90+'	Report	Parjono 16'; Taufan 73'

Mulawarman Stadium, Bontang

25 April 2012

Persijap Jepara	0 – 1	Persik Kediri
	Report	Rendy 85'

Gelora Bumi Kartini Stadium, Jepara

18 April 2012

PPSM Magelang	v	Persipasi Bekasi

Madya Stadium, Magelang

18 April 2012

Jakarta FC 1928	3 – 2	Persis Solo
De Porras 39', 54'; Danilo 69'	Report	Benitez 62'; Hasan 75'

Wilis Stadium, Madiun

18 April 2012

Persbul Buol	v	Perseman Manokwari

Kuonoto Stadium, Buol

18 April 2012

PSM Makassar	4 – 1	Madiun Putra FC
Kaharuddin 11'; Spasojević 66', 73'; Rahmat 76'	Report	Rahman 19'

Andi Mattalatta, Makassar

18 April 2012

Arema Indonesia	3 – 0 Awarded	Persipro Probolinggo
	Report

Gajayana Stadium, Malang

== Third round ==
The first leg matches were played on 9 May and the second leg on 23 May 2012.

Team 1	Agg.	Team 2	1st leg	2nd leg
Semen Padang FC	5 – 0	Pro Duta FC	2 – 0	3 – 0
Persiraja Banda Aceh	3 – 4	PSMS Medan	3 – 2	0 – 2
PSLS Lhokseumawe	1 – 4	Persebaya Surabaya	1 – 1	0 – 3
PSIS Semarang	5 – 6	Persik Kediri	1 – 1	4 – 5
Persis Solo	3 – 4	PPSM Magelang	2 – 1	1 – 3
Persiba Bantul	2 – 0	Perseman Manokwari	2 – 0	0 – 0
Persema Malang	2 – 4	Persibo Bojonegoro	1 – 1	1 – 3
PSM Makassar	2 – 2(a)	Arema Indonesia	2 – 1	0 – 1

=== First leg ===
10 May 2012

Semen Padang FC	2 – 0	Pro Duta FC
Ferdinand Sinaga 43', 65'	Report

Haji Agus Salim Stadium

9 May 2012

Persiraja Banda Aceh	3 – 2	PSMS Medan
Murilo 22'; Usman 73', 76'	Report	Vagner 52'; Andre 55'

H Dimurthala Stadium, Banda Aceh

8 May 2012

PSLS Lhokseumawe	1 – 1	Persebaya 1927
Malock 62'	Report	Halil 66'

Tunas Bangsa Stadium, Lhokseumawe

9 May 2012

PSIS Semarang	1 – 1	Persik Kediri
Anderson 70'	Report	Almiro 81'

Jatidiri Stadium, Semarang

9 May 2012

Persis Solo F.C.	2 – 1	PPSM Magelang
Hasan 62'; Rocha 80' (pen.)	Report	Yan 85' (pen.)

Manahan Stadium, Solo

9 May 2012

Persiba Bantul	2 – 0	Perseman Manokwari
Johan Manaji 37'; Bizarro 90'	Report

Sultan Agung Stadium, Bantul

10 May 2012

Persema Malang	1 – 1	Persibo Bojonegoro
Rico Satrio 73'	Report	Wahyu Teguh 17'

Gajayana Stadium

16 May 2012

PSM Makassar	2 – 1	Arema Indonesia
Spasojevic 10', 56'	Report	Jati 82'

Andi Matalatta Stadium

=== Second leg ===
30 May 2012

Pro Duta FC	0 – 3	Semen Padang FC
	Report	Pahabol 17'; Wilson 75'; Ohorella 90'

Baharoeddin Siregar Stadium

30 May 2012

PSMS Medan	2 – 0	Persiraja Banda Aceh
Vagner 2'; Pasarela 87'

Teladan Stadium

30 May 2012

Persebaya 1927	3 – 0	PSLS Lhokseumawe
Wahyu 16'; Ariawan 26', 90+2'	Report

Gelora 10 November Stadium

29 May 2012

Persik Kediri	1 – 1	PSIS Semarang
Makor 25'	Report	Agustiawan 78'
Penalties
Saputra (penalty scored); Dwi Hadi (penalty scored); Ihya (penalty scored); Tamsil (penalty scored); Makor (penalty missed)	4 – 3	(penalty scored) Han; (penalty scored) Setiawan; (penalty scored) Anderson; (penalty missed) Yakin; (penalty missed) Siregar

Brawijaya Stadium

30 May 2012

PPSM Magelang	3 – 1	Persis Solo F.C.
Supriyanto 17' (pen.), 23'; Permana 90+1'	Report	Yoga 75'

Madya Stadium

3 June 2012

Perseman Manokwari	0 – 0	Persiba Bantul
	Report

Sangeng Stadium

30 May 2012

Persibo Bojonegoro	3 – 1	Persema Malang
Arif 41'; Ortiz 58', 71'	Report	Mbamba 20'

Letjen H Soedirman Stadium

30 May 2012

Arema Indonesia	1 – 0	PSM Makassar
Angga 54'	Report

Gajayana Stadium

== Quarter-finals ==
The first leg matches were played on 6 June and the second leg on 13 June 2012.

Team 1	Agg.	Team 2	1st leg	2nd leg
Semen Padang	3 – 1	PSMS Medan	2 – 0	1 – 1
Persik Kediri	3 – 6	Persebaya Surabaya	1 – 3	2 – 3
PPSM Magelang	4 – 3	Persiba Bantul	3 – 0	1 – 3
Arema Indonesia	0 – 1	Persibo Bojonegoro	0 – 0	0 – 1

=== First leg ===
6 June 2012

Semen Padang FC	2 – 0	PSMS Medan
Wilson 87' (pen.), 90+'	Report

Haji Agus Salim Stadium

7 June 2012

Persik Kediri	1 – 3	Persebaya Surabaya
Saputra 69'	Report	Andik 57', 85'; Ariawan 89'

Brawijaya Stadium

7 June 2012

PPSM Magelang	3 – 0	Persiba Bantul
Seton 25'; Suharto 48', 81'	Report

Madya Stadium

6 June 2012

Arema Indonesia	0 – 0	Persibo Bojonegoro
	Report

Gajayana Stadium

=== Second leg ===
13 June 2012

PSMS Medan	1 – 1	Semen Padang FC
Luis 31'	Report	Aiboy 29'

Teladan Stadium

13 June 2012

Persebaya Surabaya	3 – 2	Persik Kediri
Soler 15', 28'; Ariawan 75'	Report	Makor 36', 90+'

Sasana Krida Air Force Academy Stadium

13 June 2012

Persiba Bantul	3 – 1	PPSM Magelang
Busari 7', 35'; Bizarro 90+5'	Report	Suharto 25'

Sultan Agung Stadium

13 June 2012

Persibo Bojonegoro	1 - 0	Arema Indonesia
Teguh 42'	Report

Letjen Haji Sudirman Stadium

== Semi-finals ==
The first leg matches were played on 20 June and the second leg on 27 June 2012.

Team 1	Agg.	Team 2	1st leg	2nd leg
Persebaya Surabaya	2 – 3	Semen Padang	2 – 0	0 – 3
PPSM Magelang	2 – 5	Persibo Bojonegoro	1 – 2	1 – 3

=== First leg ===
20 June 2012

Persebaya Surabaya	2 – 0	Semen Padang FC
Halil 11', 90+'	Report

Gelora Bung Tomo Stadium

20 June 2012

PPSM Magelang	1 – 2	Persibo Bojonegoro
Nur Hakim 69'	Report	Nasirov 44'; Iskandar 87'

Madya Stadium

=== Second leg ===
27 June 2012

Semen Padang FC	3 – 0	Persebaya Surabaya
Ferdinand Sinaga 45+1'; Mofu 52'; Aiboy 68'	Report

Haji Agus Salim Stadium

27 June 2012

Persibo Bojonegoro	3 – 1	PPSM Magelang
Arif 20', 90+1'; Wahyu Teguh 60'	Report	Yan 55'

Letjen Haji Sudirman Stadium

== Final ==
14 July 2012

Persibo Bojonegoro	1 – 0	Semen Padang FC
Dian Irawan 50'	Report

Sultan Agung Stadium

== Top goalscorers ==
Rank	Player	Club	Goals
1	(Liberia) Oliver Makor	Persik Kediri	6
2	(Chile) Javier Roca	Persis Solo	5
3	(Indonesia) Feri Ariawan	Persebaya 1927	4
3	(Montenegro) Ilija Spasojević	PSM Makassar	4
5	(Liberia) Edward Wilson Junior	Semen Padang	3
5	(Indonesia) Ferdinand Sinaga	Semen Padang	3
5	(Indonesia) Wahyu Teguh	Persibo Bojonegoro	3
5	(Indonesia) Tinton Suharto	PPSM Magelang	3
5	(Argentina) Emanuel De Porras	Jakarta FC 1928	3
5	(Scotland) Steven Anderson	PSIS Semarang	3
5	(Brazil) Vagner Luis	PSMS Medan	3

== See also ==
- 2011–12 Indonesian Premier League
- 2011–12 Liga Indonesia Premier Division (LPIS)
- 2013 AFC Champions League
