= 2014 Liga Indonesia Premier Division =

Liga Indonesia Premier Division
- Season: 2014
- Champions: Pusamania Borneo
- Promoted: Pusamania Borneo; Persiwa Wamena
- Relegated: PS Kwarta; PSAP Sigli; Persisko Bangko; Persipasi Bekasi; Persikab Bandung; Persiku Kudus; Persitema Temanggung; Perseman Manokwari; Perseta Tulungagung; Deltras Sidoarjo; Persid Jember; Perseka Kaimana; Persitara Jakarta Utara (withdraw); Persenga Nganjuk (withdraw); Persidafon Dafonsoro (Withdraw)
- Matches: 467
- Goals: 1,227 (2.63 per match)
- Top goalscorer: (Liberia) Yao Rudy Abblode (17 goals)
- Biggest home win: PS Bangka 9–0 Persisko (23 August 2014)
- Biggest away win: Persisko 0–10 Persih (15 August 2014)
- Highest scoring: Persikab 2–8 PSGC (11 August 2014); Persisko 0–10 Persih (15 August 2014)
- Longest winning run: 6 matches PSIS Semarang
- Longest unbeaten run: 10 matches Persis Solo; PS Bangka; PSCS Cilacap
- Longest winless run: 10 matches Deltras Sidoarjo; Persisko Merangin
- Longest losing run: 4 matches Perseka Kaimana

The 2014 Liga Indonesia Premier Division season is the nineteenth edition of Liga Indonesia Premier Division since its establishment in 1994. The competition is managed by PT. Liga Indonesia (LI). The season scheduled begins in February 2014. On 20 January, PT Liga Indonesia decided to change the schedule for the kickoff of the Premier Division this season was supposed to be held in mid-February was changed to April. After managers meeting on 27 January, PT Liga Indonesia decided that the Premier Division will begin on 15 April 2014 and will end on 27 November 2014.

This season was supposed to be followed by 66 teams (46 LI and 20 LPIS), but after the decision of the PSSI disciplinary commission on 21 December 2013, the number of participating clubs was reduced to 64 teams (46 LI and 18 LPIS) after Bontang F.C. and PSLS Lhokseumawe had been found guilty of match fixing in 2013 Indonesian Premier League playoffs. The number of participating teams can still be reduced if the club can not pass the verification that includes healthy financial condition or not in arrears in the last two seasons, and has adequate infrastructure in the form of a football stadium that meets AFC standards.

After verifying the candidates of participating teams from 3 to 28 February 2014, PT LI released the result on 10 March 2014. The list consisted of 66 teams, including three additional 2013 LPIS Premier Division teams, Persemalra Maluku Tenggara, Persewon Wondama, and Persipon Pontianak. The results were 51 teams passed, 12 teams passed with certain condition, and 3 teams didn't pass, which are Perssin Sinjai, PSSB Bireuen, and Persemalra Maluku Tenggara. Lampung FC was not included on the list.

On 8 April 2014, Persiraja Banda Aceh resigned due to lack of support from the local government. Persiraja re-joined the league after they register players for this season to the league operator although there is no guarantee of support from the local government.

In August 2014 because of financial problems, Persenga Nganjuk and Persitara Jakarta Utara withdrew from the competition and each of their results was voided. On 18 August 2014, Persidafon Dafonsoro also withdrew from the competition.

After PSIS Semarang and PSS Sleman was disqualified because of match fixing, PSGC Ciamis and Persiwa Wamena qualifies to the semifinals.

Pusamania Borneo became champion after beating Persiwa Wamena 2–1 in the final.

== Teams ==
Bhayangkara, Perseru Serui, and Persik Kediri, respectively the champions, runner-up and third-placed team in the previous season, were promoted to Indonesia Super League (ISL), and were replaced by Persiwa Wamena, Persidafon Dafonsoro, and PSPS Pekanbaru, who were relegated from the 2013 Indonesia Super League. Fourth-placed Premier Division team Persikabo Bogor failed to be promoted to the Super League after defeated by the 15th-placed finisher of the 2013 Super League, Pelita Bandung Raya by 2–1 in the promotion/relegation play-offs.

PSIR Rembang, Persiraja Banda Aceh, PSLS Lhokseumawe, and Bontang, the bottom four teams in the Indonesian Premier League (IPL) previous season, were relegated to Premier Division.

On 21 December 2013, the PSSI disciplinary commission determined that Bontang and PSLS Lhokseumawe had been found guilty of match fixing in the 2013 Premier League playoffs, and both were relegated to the third division.

On 23 December 2013, three IPL teams, Pro Duta, Persepar Palangka Raya, and Perseman Manokwari were rejected as ISL members, due to financial problems and not having an AFC standard stadium for a professional club, and were thus relegated to the Premier Division.

Thirteen teams of the LPIS Premier Division will participate in this season: champions PSS Sleman, runner-up Lampung, Persipasi Bekasi, PSSB Bireuen, Persika Karawang, PSBL Langsa, Persikab Bandung, Persekap Pasuruan, Persifa Fakfak, Persibangga Purbalingga, PSBI Blitar, Persires Banjarnegara, and Persenga Nganjuk.

PS Kwarta, Persinga Ngawi, Bintang Jaya Asahan, Martapura, Persigubin Gunung Bintang, Villa 2000, PSGC Ciamis, and Persida Sidoarjo, respectively the champion, runner-up, and six best clubs of the 2013 Liga Indonesia First Division, were promoted to Premier Division.

On 10 March 2014, three additional 2013 LPIS Premier Division teams are added to the competition's verification list, and three teams were removed from the competition for failing the verification. The additional teams are Persemalra Maluku Tenggara, Persewon Wondama, and Persipon Pontianak, while Perssin Sinjai, PSSB Bireuen, and Persemalra Southeast Maluku were removed. Lampung was not included on this list.

On 8 April 2014, Persiraja Banda Aceh resigned due to lack of support from the local government. Persiraja re-joined the league after they registered players for this season to the league, although there was no guarantee of support from the local government.

=== Stadium and locations ===
Locations of the teams in the 2014 Liga Indonesia Premier Division
Locations of the teams in the 2014 Liga Indonesia Premier Division from Java

Club	City or Regency	Stadium	Capacity	2013 season
Bintang Jaya Asahan	Asahan	Mutiara Kisaran	10,000	Third round in First Division
Deltras Sidoarjo	Sidoarjo	Gelora Delta	35,000	First round in LI Premier Division
Kalteng Putra	Palangkaraya	Tuah Pahoe Stadium	7,000	Premier League playoff runner-up
Martapura	Banjar	Demang Lehman	15,000	Third round in First Division
Madiun Putra	Madiun	Wilis	10,000	First round in LI Premier Division
Mojokerto Putra	Mojokerto	Gajahmada	10,000	Second round in LI Premier Division
Persbul Buol	Buol	Kuonoto	3,000	First round in LI Premier Division
Persebo Bondowoso	Bondowoso	Semeru	10,000	First round in LI Premier Division
Perseka Kaimana	Kaimana	Triton	5,000	First round in LI Premier Division
Persekam Metro	Malang Regency	Kanjuruhan	30,000	First round in LI Premier Division
Persekap Pasuruan	Pasuruan	Untung Suropati	5,000	LPIS Premier Division participant
Perseman Manokwari	Manokwari	Wilis	10,000	Premier League playoff participant
Persenga Nganjuk	Nganjuk	Anjukladang	10,000	LPIS Premier Division participant
Perseta Tulungagung	Tulungagung	Rejoagung	7,000	Second round in LI Premier Division
Persewangi Banyuwangi	Banyuwangi	Diponegoro	10,000	First round in LI Premier Division
Persewon Wondama Bay	Wondama Bay	Sanggeng	10,000	LPIS Premier Division participant
Persibangga Purbalingga	Purbalingga	Goentoer Darjono	15,000	LPIS Premier Division participant
Persid Jember	Jember	Notohadinegoro	10,000	First round in LI Premier Division
Persida Sidoarjo	Sidoarjo	Gelora Delta	35,000	Third round in First Division
Persidafon Dafonsoro	Jayapura Regency	Barnabas Youwe	15,000	16th in Super League
Persifa Fakfak	Fakfak	16 November	7,000	LPIS Premier Division participant
Persigo Gorontalo	Gorontalo	Merdeka	10,000	First round in LI Premier Division
Persigubin Bintang Mountains	Bintang Mountains	Barnabas Youwe	15,000	Third round in First Division
Persih Tembilahan	Indragiri Hilir	Beringin	5,000	First round in LI Premier Division
Persika Karawang	Karawang	Singaperbangsa	20,000	LPIS Premier Division participant
Persikab Bandung	Bandung Regency	Jalak Harupat	40,000	LPIS Premier Division participant
Persikabo Bogor	Bogor Regency	Pakansari; Persikabo	30,000; 15,000	Knockout stage in LI Premier Division
Persikad Depok	Depok	Merpati Stadium	1,000	First round in LI Premier Division
Persiku Kudus	Kudus	Wergu Wetan	10,000	First round in LI Premier Division
Persinga Ngawi	Ngawi; Madiun	Ketonggo; Wilis	10,000; 10,000	First Division runner-up
Persip Pekalongan	Pekalongan	Hoegeng	25,000	First round in LI Premier Division
Persipasi Bekasi	Bekasi	Patriot; PTIK; Persikabo	30,000; 5,000; 15,000	LPIS Premier Division participant
Persipon Pontianak	Pontianak	Sultan Syarif Abdurrahman	15,000	LPIS Premier Division participant
Persipur Purwodadi	Grobogan	Krida Bakti	15,000	First round in LI Premier Division
Persiraja Banda Aceh	Banda Aceh	Harapan Bangsa Stadium	40,000	Premier League playoff participant
Persires Kuningan	Kuningan	Mashud Wisnusaputra	10,000	LPIS Premier Division participant (as Persires Banjarnegara)
Persis Solo	Surakarta	Manahan	35,000	First round in LI Premier Division
Persisko Bangko	West Tanjung Jabung Regency	Karya Bhakti	3,000	Second round in LI Premier Division
Persitara Jakarta Utara	North Jakarta	Kamal Muara; Tugu	10,000; 10,000	First round in LI Premier Division
Persitema Temanggung	Temanggung	Bhumi Phala	15,000	First round in LI Premier Division
Persiwa Wamena	Jayawijaya	Pendidikan Stadium	15,000	17th in Super League
PPSM Sakti Magelang	Magelang	Abu Bakrin	10,000	First round in LI Premier Division
Pro Duta	Medan	Teladan	22,234	Premier League playoff champion
PS Bangka	Bangka	Orom	3,000	Second round in LI Premier Division
PS Bengkulu	Bengkulu	Semarak	15,000	First round in LI Premier Division
PS Kwarta	Deli Serdang	Teladan	22,234	First Division champions
PS Sumbawa Barat	West Sumbawa	Lalu Magaparang	15,000	First round in LI Premier Division
PSAP Sigli	Pidie	Kuta Asan	15,000	First round in LI Premier Division
PSBI Blitar	Blitar	Aryo Srengat	6,000	LPIS Premier Division participant
PSBK Blitar	Blitar Regency	Gelora Supriyadi	15,000	First round in LI Premier Division
PSBL Langsa	Langsa	Langsa Stadium	8,000	LPIS Premier Division participant
PSBS Biak Numfor	Biak Numfor	Cendrawasih	30,000	Second round in LI Premier Division
PSCS Cilacap	Cilacap	Wijayakusuma	10,000	Second round in LI Premier Division
PSGC Ciamis	Ciamis	Galuh	10,000	Third round in First Division
PSIM Yogyakarta	Yogyakarta	Mandala Krida	25,000	First round in LI Premier Division
PSIR Rembang	Rembang	Krida	10,000	Premier League playoff participant
PSIS Semarang	Semarang	Jatidiri	25,000	Second round in LI Premier Division
PSMS Medan	Medan	Teladan	22,234	First round in LI Premier Division
PSPS Pekanbaru	Pekanbaru	Kaharudin Nasution	25,000	18th in Super League
PSS Sleman	Sleman	Maguwoharjo	10,000	LPIS Premier Division champions
Pusamania Borneo	Samarinda	Segiri	25,000	Second round in LI Premier Division (as Perseba Super Bangkalan)
Villa 2000	South Tangerang	GOR Ciracas	5,000	Third round in First Division
Yahukimo	Yahukimo	Andi Mattalatta	15,000	First round in LI Premier Division

Notes

1. Indonesian Premier League (IPL) : Club qualified for the Super League but did not pass the verification so that they should be relegated to the premier division.
2. Persigubin Bintang Mountains (PGB): They played in Barnabas Youwe Stadium, Jayapura after not stadium pass the verification in Bintang Mountains.
3. Persipasi Bekasi (PASI): Because there is no permission to use Patriot Stadium, Bekasi, they propose changes homebase be Persikabo Stadium, Bogor Regency.
4. Persitara North Jakarta (TARA): They filed a change of home ground to Tugu Stadium, North Jakarta, due to no longer being allowed by the police to hold the match in Kamal Muara Stadium.
5. Yahukimo (YFC): They played in Andi Mattalatta Stadium, Makassar after not stadium pass the verification in Yahukimo.

=== Personnel and kits ===
Note: Flags indicate national team as has been defined under FIFA eligibility rules. Players and Managers may hold more than one non-FIFA nationality.

Team	Coach	Captain	Kit manufacturer	Shirt sponsor
Bintang Jaya Asahan	(Indonesia) Abdul Rahman Gurning	(Indonesia) Irwanto		Semen Merah Putih
Deltras Sidoarjo	(Indonesia) Riono Asnan	(Indonesia) Yoga Wahyu		
Kalteng Putra	(Indonesia) Edy Paryono	(Brazil) Antônio Teles		EW Plantation
Martapura FC	(Indonesia) Frans Sinatra Huwae	(Indonesia) Isnan Ali	Mitre	
Madiun Putra	(Indonesia) Wahyudi	(Indonesia) Agus Riawan		Radar Madiun
Mojokerto Putra	(Indonesia) Jamal Yastro	(Indonesia) Asman Akman		
Persbul Buol	(Indonesia) Jufri Bakri			
Persebo Bondowoso	(Indonesia) Bambang Sumantri	(Indonesia) Ali Usman		Kresno Group
Perseka Kaimana	(Indonesia) Aris Kambu	(Indonesia) Victor Arus		Bank Papua
Persekam Metro FC	(Indonesia) Suswantoro	(Indonesia) Setyo Adhi Prastowo	Injers	Radar Malang
Persekap Pasuruan	(Indonesia) Danurwindo	(Indonesia) Trias Budi Santoso	Mitre	BJ. Perdana Hotel & Resort
Perseman Manokwari	(Brazil) Wanderley	(Indonesia) Lukas Latuperissa	Nike	Bank Papua
Persenga Nganjuk	(Indonesia) Sunardi C.	(Indonesia) Mohamad Irvan Santoso		
Perseta Tulungagung	(Indonesia) Syamsul Bahri	(Indonesia) Bambang Sulistyo	Cilo Sport	
Persewangi Banyuwangi	(Indonesia) Bagong Iswahyudi			
Persewon Wondama	(Indonesia) Buddy Susanto	(Indonesia) Kelly Runfabe		Bank Papua
Persibangga Purbalingga	(Indonesia) Ahmad Muhariah	(Cameroon) Bruno Casimir		
Persid Jember	(Indonesia) Santoso Pribadi			
Persida Sidoarjo	(Indonesia) Freddy Muli	(Indonesia) Uston Nawawi	Cilo Sport	Kapal Api
Persidafon Dafonsoro	(Indonesia) Frits Yom			Bank Papua
Persifa Fak-fak	(Indonesia) Joko Susilo	(Indonesia) Arnold Bame		Bank Papua
Persigo Gorontalo	(Indonesia) Mohammad Khaidir			
Persigubin Gunung Bintang	(Indonesia) Mial Armand	(Indonesia) Engelbertus Uropmabin		Bank Papua
Persih Tembilahan	(Indonesia) Ismiadi	(Indonesia) Firman Usman		
Persika Karawang	(Indonesia) Suimin Diharja	(Indonesia) Agus Suprianto	MBB Apparel	Bank BJB
Persikab Bandung	(Indonesia) Suhandono	(Indonesia) Andro Levandy	Kitlec Sportindo	Obs
Persikabo Bogor	(Indonesia) Kas Hartadi	(Indonesia) Rudi Widodo	MBB Apparel	
Persikad Depok	(Indonesia) Bonggo Pribadi	(Indonesia) Fadli Haris	Cilo Sport	AsmaNadia
Persiku Kudus	(Indonesia) Agus Riyanto	(Indonesia) Junedi	Vilour	Bank Jateng
Persinga Ngawi	(Indonesia) Rully Nere	(Indonesia) Muhammad Zamnur		Bank Jatim
Persip Pekalongan	(Indonesia) Sugeng Widodo	(Indonesia) Aris Fandi Kurniawan	Vilour	
Persipasi Bekasi	(Indonesia) Warta Kusma	(Indonesia) Agus Supriyanto	Kitlec Sportindo	
Persipon Pontianak	(Indonesia) Max Pieters	(Indonesia) Imam Subekti	Joma	
Persipur Purwodadi	(Indonesia) Nunung Kushardiyanto	(Indonesia) Widiyanto Ahmad		Hadist Group
Persiraja Banda Aceh	(Indonesia) Akhyar Ilyas	(Indonesia) Kurniawan		Imhetro
Persires Kuningan	(Indonesia) Asep Muslim	(Liberia) Patrick Kaiyer Sieh	MBB Apparel	
Persis Solo	(Indonesia) Widyantoro	(Argentina) Marcelo Cirelli	90 Minutes	
Persisko Merangin	(Indonesia) Yusran	(Indonesia) Fadli Fernanda		
Persitara North	(Indonesia) Wawan Hermawan	(Indonesia) Sutriyono	MBB Apparel	
Persitema Temanggung	(Indonesia) Yopi Riwoe	(Indonesia) Adik Sumarno	Kitlec Sportindo	Bank Jateng
Persiwa Wamena	(Indonesia) Mahmudiana	(Indonesia) Pieter Rumaropen		Bank Papua
PPSM Sakti Magelang	(Indonesia) M. Hasan	(Paraguay) Christian René	Multi Sport	DNA Taxi
Pro Duta FC	(Uruguay) Alfredo Gonzalez	(Indonesia) Muhammad Rifqi	Adidas	Humega Liquid
PS Bangka	(Indonesia) Sanusi Rahman	(Liberia) Adolphus Nagbe	SPECS	PT Timah tbk
PS Bengkulu	(Indonesia) M. Nasir	(Indonesia) Taufik Hasbuna		
PS Kwarta	(Indonesia) Slamet Riyadi	(Indonesia) Zulkarnain	Kappa	Sumut Pos
PS Sumbawa Barat	(Indonesia) Winedy Purwito	(Cameroon) Tássio Bako	Cilo Sport	Indotan Sumbawa Barat
PSAP Sigli	(Indonesia) M. Khaidir	(Indonesia) Reza Fandi		
PSBI Blitar	(Indonesia) Efendi Aziz	(Indonesia) Purwanto		Cahya Yamaha; Unisba Blitar
PSBK Blitar	(Indonesia) I Putu Gede	(Indonesia) Slamet Santoso		
PSBL Langsa	(Indonesia) Anwar	(Mali) Moussa Traore		Pemko Langsa
PSBS Biak Numfor	(Indonesia) Frengky Samay		MBB Apparel	Bank Papua
PSCS Cilacap	(Indonesia) Gatot Barnowo	(Indonesia) Taryono		Pertamina; Wp
PSGC Ciamis	(Indonesia) Heri Rafni Kotari	(Indonesia) Achmad Abdul Basid	Cilo Sport	SumberJaya
PSIM Yogyakarta	(Indonesia) Seto Nurdiyantoro	(Indonesia) Topas Pamungkas		
PSIR Rembang	(Indonesia) Bambang Handoyo	(Indonesia) Yoni Ustaf Bukhori		Bank Mega Syariah
PSIS Semarang	(Indonesia) Eko Riyadi	(Indonesia) Fauzan Fajri	JR77 Apparel	Yamaha; No Ticket No Game!
PSMS Medan	(Indonesia) Kustiono	(Indonesia) Enjang Rohiman	SPECS	
PSPS Pekanbaru	(Indonesia) Philip Hansen	(Indonesia) Novrianto		
PSS Sleman	(Indonesia) Edy Broto (interim coach)	(Indonesia) Anang Hadi	Sembada	Muncul Group
Pusamania Borneo	(Indonesia) Iwan Setiawan	(Brazil) Danilo Fernando	TOWN Apparel	Nahusam Pratama Indonesia
Villa 2000	(Indonesia) Ricky Nelson	(Brazil) Antônio Cláudio	Gevin Sports	Villa2000.net
Yahukimo FC	(Indonesia) Rivai Arsyad			Bank Papua

=== Coach changes ===
==== Pre-season ====
Team	Outgoing coach	Manner of departure	Date of vacancy	Incoming coach	Date of appointment
Persewangi Banyuwangi	(Indonesia) M. Hasan	Signed by PPSM Sakti Magelang	September 2013	(Indonesia) Bagong Iswahyudi	September 2013
PPSM Sakti Magelang	(Indonesia)	Sacked	September 2013	(Indonesia) M. Hasan	September 2013
PSS Sleman	(Indonesia) Lafran Pribadi	Contract terminated	September 2013	(Indonesia) Sartono Anwar	2 December 2013
PSIS Semarang	(Indonesia) Firmandoyo	Contract terminated	September 2013	(Indonesia) Eko Riyadi	10 December 2013
Persikabo Bogor	(Indonesia) Denny Syamsudin	Contract terminated	September 2013	(Indonesia) Kas Hartadi	17 December 2013
Persidafon Dafonsoro	(Indonesia) Agus Yuwono	Signed by Gresik United	17 November 2013	(Indonesia) Frits Yom	January 2014
Pro Duta	(Serbia) Dejan Antonić	Signed by Pelita Bandung Raya	19 November 2013	(Uruguay) Alfredo Gonzalez	27 January 2014
PSMS Medan	(Indonesia) Suharto A.D.	Resigned	November 2013	(Indonesia) Liestiadi	9 January 2014
Perseman Manokwari	(Moldova) Arcan Iurie	Signed by Persita Tangerang	2 December 2013	(Brazil) Wanderley	January 2014
Persitema Temanggung	(Indonesia) Eko Riyadi	Signed by PSIS Semarang	10 December 2013	(Indonesia) Sri Widadi	January 2014
Persis Solo	(Indonesia) Agung Setyabudi	End of caretaker role	17 December 2013	(Indonesia) Widyantoro	29 December 2013
PSPS Pekanbaru	(Indonesia) Afrizal Tanjung	End of caretaker role	December 2013	(Indonesia) Philip Hansen	31 December 2013
Persikad Depok	(Indonesia) Meiyadi Rakasiwi	Sacked	December 2013	(Indonesia) Bonggo Pribadi	January 2014
Persigo Gorontalo	(Indonesia) Welly Podungge	Sacked	December 2013	(Indonesia) Mohammad Khaidir	January 2014
Persifa Fak-fak	(Indonesia) A. Sutiana	Sacked	January 2014	(Indonesia) Joko Susilo	January 2014
Persiku Kudus	(Indonesia) Lukas Tumbuan	Sacked	January 2014	(Indonesia) Agus Riyanto	January 2014
PSAP Sigli	(Indonesia) Rudi Saari	Pass away	1 January 2014	(Indonesia) M. Khaidir	28 March 2014
Persida Sidoarjo	(Indonesia) Hayatul Fauzi	Sacked	4 January 2014	(Indonesia) Freddy Muli	4 January 2014
Kwarta	(Indonesia) Lilik Suheri	Sacked	10 January 2014	(Indonesia) Slamet Riyadi	10 January 2014
PSMS Medan	(Indonesia) Liestiadi	Resigned	11 January 2014	(Indonesia) Edi Syahputra	11 January 2014
Bintang Jaya	(Indonesia) Sriyatno	Sacked	February 2014	(Indonesia) Zulheri Lubis	February 2014
Persewon Wondama	(Indonesia) Didik Listiyantara	End of contract	February 2014	(Indonesia) Buddy Susanto	February 2014
PSMS Medan	(Indonesia) Edi Syahputra	Signed by PSGL Gayo Lues	February 2014	(Indonesia) Kustiono	February 2014
Persinga Ngawi	(Indonesia) Putut Widjanarko	Mutual consent	February 2014	(Indonesia) Rully Nere	February 2014
Sumbawa Barat	(Indonesia) Margono	End caretaker role	February 2014	(Indonesia) Winedy Purwito	23 February 2014
PS Bangka	(Indonesia) Lapril A.S.	End of contract	February 2014	(Indonesia) Gusnul Yakin	6 March 2014
PSBS Biak Numfor	(Indonesia) Jaelani Saputra	Contract terminated	February 2014	(Indonesia) Frengky Samay	13 March 2014
PSBI Blitar	(Indonesia) M. Arifin	End of contract	February 2014	(Indonesia) Efendi Aziz	18 March 2014
Mojokerto Putra	(Indonesia) Hartono	Sacked	March 2014	(Indonesia) Jamal Yastro	March 2014
PS Bangka	(Indonesia) Gusnul Yakin	Still in sanctions by the federation	March 2014	(Indonesia) Sanusi Rahman	March 2014
PSIM Yogyakarta	(Indonesia) Maman Durrachman	To be Technical Director	10 March 2014	(Indonesia) Seto Nurdiyantoro	10 March 2014

==== In-season ====
Team	Outgoing coach	Manner of departure	Date of vacancy	Position in table	Incoming coach	Date of appointment
Bintang Jaya Asahan	(Indonesia) Zulheri Lubis	24 April 2014	Sacked	7th in Group 1	(Indonesia) Abdul Rahman Gurning	24 April 2014
Persitara North	(Indonesia) Jaelani Saputra	27 April 2014	Resigned	8th in Group 2	(Indonesia) Wawan Hermawan	27 April 2014
Pusamania Borneo	(Indonesia) Nus Yadera	29 April 2014	Sacked	2nd in Group 6	(Indonesia) Iwan Setiawan	30 April 2014
PSS Sleman	(Indonesia) Sartono Anwar	10 May 2014	Resigned	8th in Group 5	(Indonesia) Edy Broto (interim coach)	11 May 2014
Persikab Bandung	(Indonesia) Hendriawan	14 May 2014	Sacked	8th in Group 3	(Indonesia) Suhandono	14 May 2014

== Foreign players ==
Club	Visa 1	Visa 2	Non-Visa Foreign
Bintang Jaya Asahan	(Guinea) Sylla Daouda	(Guinea) Moussa Keita	None
Deltras Sidoarjo^{3}	None	None	None
Kalteng Putra	(Brazil) Antônio Teles	(Nigeria) Charles Parker	None
Martapura FC	(Cameroon) Henry Njobi Elad	(Sierra Leone) Brima Pepito	None
Madiun Putra	(Brazil) Anderson Da Silva	(Ivory Coast) Toure Mukhtar	None
Mojokerto Putra	(Cameroon) Jacques Evrad	(Burkina Faso) Alain Nebie	None
Persbul Buol	None	None	None
Persebo Bondowoso	(Nigeria) Godstime Ouseloka	None	None
Perseka Kaimana	None	None	None
Persekam Metro	None	None	None
Persekap Pasuruan	(Brazil) Tingga	(Cameroon) Ngon A Djam	None
Perseman Manokwari^{5}	None	None	None
Persenga Nganjuk	(Burkina Faso) Germain Bationo	(Liberia) Titus Johnson Junior	None
Perseta Tulungagung	(Sierra Leone) Anthony Williams	(Cameroon) Banaken Bassoken	None
Persewangi Banyuwangi	(Paraguay) Nelson Chaparro	(Nigeria) Peter Lipede	None
Persewon Wondama	(Liberia) Alex Robinson	(Liberia) Abel Cielo Quioh	None
Persibangga Purbalingga	(Cameroon) Bruno Casimir	(Cameroon) Emaleu Serge	None
Persid Jember	(Cameroon) Augustin Elie Mbom	None	None
Persida Sidoarjo	None	None	None
Persidafon Dafonsoro^{4}	None	None	None
Persifa Fak-fak	None	None	None
Persigo Gorontalo	None	None	None
Persigubin Gunung Bintang	(Cameroon) Batang Ba Issom	(Cameroon) Omboudou Liboire	None
Persih Tembilahan	(Guinea) Lamarana Diallo	None	None
Persika Karawang	(Iran) Reza Abbasfard	(Liberia) Amos Marah	None
Persikab Bandung	(Cameroon) Ngom Totto	(Netherlands) Georges	None
Persikabo Bogor	(Cameroon) Jacques Joel Tsimi	(Paraguay) Aldo Baretto	None
Persikad Depok	(Chile) Patricio Jimenez	(Chad) Agwa Abila	None
Persiku Kudus	(Mali) Sylla Bamba	(Mali) Gakou Amadou	None
Persinga Ngawi	(Cameroon) Arsene Aime Ntolo	(Togo) Djaledjete Bedalbe	None
Persip Pekalongan	(Ivory Coast) Siaka Dembele	(Nigeria) Charles Orock	None
Persipasi Bekasi	(Brazil) Rodrigo Wallace	(Liberia) Stephen Mennoh	None
Persipon Pontianak	(Chile) Julio Cid	(Chile) Juan Luis Lillo	None
Persipur Purwodadi	(Liberia) John Tamba Barnes	(Cameroon) Bienvenue Nnengue	None
Persiraja Banda Aceh	None	None	None
Persires Kuningan	(Liberia) Julius Jay Kwateh	(Liberia) Patrick Kaiyer Sieh	None
Persis Solo	(Iran) Javad Moradi	(Cameroon) Nnana Onana	None
Persisko Merangin^{5} ^{6}	(Chile) Christian Alejandro González	(Brazil) Victor da Silva	None
Persitara North Jakarta	(Cameroon) Kamdem Meya Martial	(Liberia) Esaiah Pello Benson	None
Persitema Temanggung	(Mali) Moussa Sidibe	(Burkina Faso) Mahamadi Ilboudo	None
Persiwa Wamena	(Liberia) Sengbah Kennedy	(Liberia) Yao Rudy Abdole	None
PPSM Sakti Magelang	(Paraguay) Christian René	(Cameroon) Christian Bekatal	None
Pro Duta	(Argentina) Walter Brizuela	(Iran) Vali Khorsandipish	None
PS Bangka	(Liberia) Adolphus Nagbe	(Liberia) Sackie Doe	None
PS Bengkulu	None	None	None
PS Kwarta	(Argentina) Jorge Alberto Abdala	None	None
PS Sumbawa Barat	(Cameroon) Tássio Bako	(Brazil) Evandro	None
PSAP Sigli^{4}	None	None	None
PSBI Blitar	(Cameroon) Nkomo Joseph	(Mali) Makan Dembele	None
PSBK Blitar	(Liberia) George Dakar Mitchell	(Nigeria) Ekene Ikenwa	None
PSBL Langsa	(Mali) Moussa Traore	(Ivory Coast) Donald Bissa	None
PSBS Biak Numfor^{5} ^{6}	(Liberia) Varney Pas Boakay	(Liberia) George Mark Davies	None
PSCS Cilacap	(Cameroon) Erick Awaoundja	(Liberia) Roberto Kwateh	None
PSGC Ciamis	(Liberia) Morris Power	(Aruba) Emile Linkers	None
PSIM Yogyakarta	None	None	None
PSIR Rembang	(Guinea) Kande Lansana	(Cameroon) Christian Lenglolo	None
PSIS Semarang	(Uruguay) Ronald Fagundez	(Argentina) Julio Alcorsé	None
PSMS Medan^{3}	None	None	None
PSPS Pekanbaru^{3}	(Cameroon) Nana Onana	(Burkina Faso) Alan Hasamoah	None
PSS Sleman	(Netherlands) Kristian Adelmund	(Cameroon) Guy Junior Ondoua	None
Pusamania Borneo	(Brazil) Danilo Fernando	(Argentina) Fernando Soler	None
Villa 2000	(Brazil) Antônio Cláudio	(Nigeria) Gbeneme Friday	None
Yahukimo FC	None	None	None

Note:
^1Those players who were born and started their professional career abroad but have since gained Indonesia Residency;
^2Injury Replacement Players;
^3Deltras Sidoarjo, PSPS Pekanbaru, and PSMS Medan, allowed to register players with a maximum quota (30 players), without foreign players. If able to complete the arrears in accordance with the April 14 deadline, the club concerned may use the foreign players.
^4Persidafon and PSAP, players are allowed to register with the minimum quota (18 players), without foreign players. If the club can complete the arrears in accordance with the April 14 deadline, the club in question may register players up to a maximum quota, but still without any foreign players.
^5PSBS Biak Numfor, Perseman Manokwari, and Persisko Merangin, allowed to register players with a maximum quota (30 players), without foreign players. If able to complete the arrears in accordance with the April 14 deadline, the club concerned may use the foreign players, but not able to complete club may disqualification from league.

== First round ==
PT Liga Indonesia announced the groupings of the Premier Division after club verification was completed on 10 March. The competition was divided into groups of six to eight, depending on the number of clubs that passed verification. The division of the groups was carried out on 18 March 2014, after re-verification of the 12 teams that qualified in the first stage of verification in February but had not met the financial aspect.

This round began on 15 April 2014 and ended on 23 August 2014. 63 teams competed in this round.

=== Group 1 ===
Pos	Team	Pld	W	D	L	GF	GA	GD	Pts	Qualification or relegation	PDFC	RIA	MED	BJA	PSBL	RAJ	KWT	PSAP
1	Pro Duta	14	8	5	1	28	13	+15	29	Advances to Second round		2–0	0–0	0–3	2–2	3–1	3–1	5–0
2	PSPS Riau	14	6	2	6	18	19	−1	20	Advances to Second round	0–2		3–1	1–0	0–3	1–1	3–2	6–0
3	PSMS	14	4	7	3	12	7	+5	19		0–0	2–0		1–0	0–0	1–0	0–0	5–0
4	PS Bintang Jaya Asahan	14	5	4	5	16	13	+3	19		1–3	4–1	0–0		1–0	1–1	0–0	3–2
5	PSBL Langsa	14	5	4	5	16	15	+1	19		1–3	0–1	1–1	1–0		1–0	1–0	1–1
6	Persiraja (Note: Due to the lack of support by the local government, Persiraja Banda Aceh were officially declared bankrupt and withdrew from their participation in the league. Persiraja re-joined the league after they registered players for the season to the league, although there was no guarantee of support from the local government.)	14	4	5	5	15	16	−1	17		2–2	1–2	1–0	3–1	2–0		1–1	1–0
7	PS Kwarta (R)	14	3	6	5	14	14	0	15	Relegation to 2015 Liga Nusantara	1–2	0–0	1–1	0–0	1–0	2–0		3–0
8	PSAP Sigli (R)	14	3	3	8	13	35	−22	12	Relegation to 2015 Liga Nusantara	1–1	1–0	1–0	0–2	3–5	1–1	3–2	

Updated to match(es) played on 23 August 2014. Source: 2014 Premier Division table and 2014 Premier Division results
Rules for classification: 1) points; 2) goal difference; 3) number of goals scored.
(R) Relegated

=== Group 2 ===
Pos	Team	Pld	W	D	L	GF	GA	GD	Pts	Qualification or relegation	BGK	KABO	PSIH	VLA	PSBU	PKAD	PSKO
1	PS Bangka	12	9	3	0	29	8	+21	30	Advances to Second round		1–0	3–2	1–0	4–1	2–0	9–0
2	Persikabo Bogor	12	7	3	2	17	9	+8	24	Advances to Second round	1–1		1–0	1–1	1–0	1–0	4–0
3	Persih Tembilahan	12	6	1	5	26	15	+11	19		3–3	3–1		2–1	2–0	2–1	1–0
4	Villa 2000	12	4	4	4	15	13	+2	16		0–1	1–2	3–1		1–0	0–0	4–2
5	PS Bengkulu	12	4	3	5	12	15	−3	15		1–3	1–1	1–0	2–2		1–0	3–0
6	Persikad Depok	12	2	5	5	10	9	+1	11		0–0	0–1	1–0	1–1	1–1		6–0
7	Persisko Bangko (R)	12	0	1	11	3	43	−40	1	Relegation to 2015 Liga Nusantara	0–1	1–3	0–10	0–1	0–1	0–0	

Updated to match(es) played on 23 August 2014. Source: 2014 Premier Division table and 2014 Premier Division results
Rules for classification: 1) points; 2) goal difference; 3) number of goals scored.
(R) Relegated

=== Group 3 ===
Pos	Team	Pld	W	D	L	GF	GA	GD	Pts	Qualification or relegation	PSCS	PSGC	KAR	PPBG	PON	PSRK	PASI	PSBD
1	PSCS Cilacap	14	8	6	0	27	9	+18	30	Advances to Second round		3–0	2–1	2–0	3–1	1–1	3–1	5–0
2	PSGC Ciamis	14	8	4	2	25	13	+12	28	Advances to Second round	1–1		1–1	1–0	1–0	4–1	2–1	3–1
3	Persika Karawang	14	5	5	4	24	17	+7	20		1–1	0–0		3–1	1–1	1–0	2–2	2–0
4	Persibangga Purbalingga	14	5	4	5	17	17	0	19		1–1	1–2	3–1		1–1	2–0	0–0	3–1
5	Persipon Pontianak	14	4	4	6	20	21	−1	16		0–2	1–2	2–0	4–2		2–1	2–3	3–0
6	Persires Kuningan	14	4	4	6	13	20	−7	16		1–1	0–0	3–2	0–0	1–0		0–2	1–0
7	Persipasi Bekasi (R)	14	5	3	6	21	22	−1	15	Relegation to 2015 Liga Nusantara	0–1	1–0	0–4	0–1	1–1	3–1		0–3 (Note: Persipasi forfeited after they failed to organize their match against Persikab on 15 April 2014.)
8	Persikab Bandung (R)	14	1	2	11	14	42	−28	5	Relegation to 2015 Liga Nusantara	1–1	2–8	1–5	1–2	1–1	2–3	1–5	

Updated to match(es) played on 23 August 2014. Source: 2014 Premier Division table and 2014 Premier Division results
Rules for classification: 1) points; 2) goal difference; 3) number of goals scored.
(R) Relegated

=== Group 4 ===
Pos	Team	Pld	W	D	L	GF	GA	GD	Pts	Qualification or relegation	SOL	SMG	REM	PPUR	PSIP	PPSM	PSKU	TEMA
1	Persis	14	8	5	1	20	9	+11	29	Advances to Second round		1–0	3–0	1–0	1–0	2–2	3–1	2–0
2	PSIS	14	9	2	3	29	12	+17	29	Advances to Second round	1–1		1–0	3–1	3–0	4–0	3–2	4–0
3	PSIR	14	6	3	5	18	13	+5	21		1–1	2–0		2–1	3–1	3–0	2–0	3–0
4	Persipur Purwodadi	14	5	3	6	19	18	+1	18		0–1	3–2	2–1		3–0	4–1	0–0	2–0
5	Persip Pekalongan	14	5	2	7	16	21	−5	17		0–0	0–2	2–0	3–0		1–0	1–1	3–0
6	PPSM Sakti Magelang	14	5	2	7	21	30	−9	17		2–1	1–3	2–1	2–1	5–1		3–3	3–2
7	Persiku Kudus (R)	14	3	7	4	16	18	−2	16	Relegation to 2015 Liga Nusantara	2–2	1–1	0–0	0–0	2–1	2–0		2–0
8	Persitema Temanggung (R)	14	2	2	10	9	27	−18	8	Relegation to 2015 Liga Nusantara	0–1	0–2	0–0	2–2	1–3	2–0	2–0	

Updated to match(es) played on 23 August 2014. Source: 2014 Premier Division table and 2014 Premier Division results
Rules for classification: 1) points; 2) goal difference; 3) number of goals scored.
(R) Relegated

=== Group 5 ===
Pos	Team	Pld	W	D	L	GF	GA	GD	Pts	Qualification or relegation	PSS	NGW	PSBI	YOG	MADI	PSBK	PSMN
1	PSS	12	5	4	3	27	11	+16	19	Advances to Second round		5–0	4–0	0–0	4–1	4–1	5–1
2	Persinga Ngawi	12	5	4	3	16	18	−2	19	Advances to Second round	1–0		0–0	1–1	1–2	2–2	4–2
3	PSBI Blitar	12	5	3	4	11	14	−3	18		2–1	2–0		1–1	1–0	1–0	1–0
4	PSIM	12	3	6	3	15	13	+2	15		2–2	0–1	2–0		3–1	1–3	2–0
5	Madiun Putra	12	3	5	4	11	15	−4	14		0–0	1–1	2–0	1–1		1–1	1–0
6	PSBK Blitar	12	2	7	3	15	17	−2	13		1–1	2–3	1–1	1–1	1–1		0–0
7	Perseman Manokwari (R)	12	4	1	7	14	21	−7	13	Relegation to 2015 Liga Nusantara	2–1	1–2	3–2	2–1	2–0	1–2	

Updated to match(es) played on 23 August 2014. Source: 2014 Premier Division table and 2014 Premier Division results
Rules for classification: 1) points; 2) goal difference; 3) number of goals scored.
(R) Relegated

Persenga forfeited a game against Perseman on 28 May 2014 after they failed to appear.

=== Group 6 ===
Pos	Team	Pld	W	D	L	GF	GA	GD	Pts	Qualification or relegation	BOR	MTP	KTP	PMP	SIDA	SKAP	SETA	DEL
1	Pusamania Borneo	14	9	2	3	26	13	+13	29	Advances to Second round		2–1	2–1	2–0	3–0	4–1	2–0	2–1
2	Martapura	14	8	4	2	27	13	+14	28	Advances to Second round	2–1		1–0	2–0	1–0	4–0	4–2	4–1
3	Kalteng Putra	14	6	3	5	18	17	+1	21		1–1	3–1		1–1	2–0	1–0	3–1	3–1
4	PS Mojokerto Putra	14	4	6	4	21	22	−1	18		2–0	3–3	2–0		1–0	2–0	1–1	1–1
5	Persida Sidoarjo	14	5	2	7	15	18	−3	17		2–0	0–0	3–0	5–2		1–0	1–1	2–0
6	Persekap Pasuruan	14	4	4	6	16	19	−3	16		1–1	0–0	3–0	1–1	2–0		2–0	2–0
7	Perseta Tulungagung (R)	14	4	2	8	20	32	−12	14	Relegation to 2015 Liga Nusantara	1–5	0–3	0–2	3–2	4–1	4–3		1–0
8	Deltras Sidoarjo (R)	14	2	5	7	15	24	−9	11	Relegation to 2015 Liga Nusantara	0–1	1–1	1–1	3–3	2–0	1–1	3–2	

Updated to match(es) played on 23 August 2014. Source: 2014 Premier Division table and 2014 Premier Division results
Rules for classification: 1) points; 2) goal difference; 3) number of goals scored.
(R) Relegated

=== Group 7 ===
Pos	Team	Pld	W	D	L	GF	GA	GD	Pts	Qualification or relegation	PSBY	SEBO	KAMM	BUOL	SUMB	SEM	PSDJ
1	Persewangi Banyuwangi	12	6	5	1	10	3	+7	23	Advances to Second round		1–0	1–0	0–0	1–0	3–0	1–0
2	Persebo Bondowoso	12	5	4	3	10	9	+1	19	Advances to Second round	0–0		1–0	2–0	1–0	2–1	2–1
3	Persekam Metro	12	5	3	4	15	8	+7	18		0–0	2–0		0–0	1–1	2–0	4–0
4	Persbul Buol	12	4	5	3	16	10	+6	17		1–2	1–1	2–0		1–0	3–1	3–0 (Note: Persid Jember forfeited their match against Persbul Buol after they failed to appear on 15 April 2014 at Kuwonto Stadium.)
5	Sumbawa Barat	12	4	2	6	10	9	+1	14		1–0	2–0	1–2	0–0		2–0	2–0
6	Persigo Gorontalo	12	3	3	6	9	19	−10	12		1–1	0–0	2–1	1–1	2–1		1–0
7	Persid Jember (R)	12	3	2	7	9	21	−12	11	Relegation to 2015 Liga Nusantara	0–0	1–1	0–3	3–1	1–0	3–0	

Updated to match(es) played on 23 August 2014. Source: 2014 Premier Division table and 2014 Premier Division results
Rules for classification: 1) points; 2) goal difference; 3) number of goals scored.
(R) Relegated

=== Group 8 ===
Pos	Team	Pld	W	D	L	GF	GA	GD	Pts	Qualification or relegation	PWA	GUBI	BIA	WON	SIFA	YAHU	SEKA
1	Persiwa	12	8	1	3	19	9	+10	25	Advances to Second round		1–0	2–1	1–0	2–0	1–0	2–0
2	Persigubin	12	5	5	2	18	8	+10	20	Advances to Second round	0–0		0–0	3–0 (Note: Persewon Wondama forfeited after they failed to attend for the matches against Perseka Kaimana on 15 August 2014 and against Persigubin Gunung Bintang on 23 August 2014.)	1–1	3–1	3–0
3	PSBS	12	7	2	3	17	12	+5	20		2–1	2–2		1–0	3–0 (Note: Persifa Fakfak forfeited after they failed to appear for the match against PSBS Biak Numfor on 15 August 2014.)	1–0	1–0
4	Persewon Wondama (Note: Persewon Wondama were deducted six points after failing to appear for matches on 15 August and 23 August 2014.)	12	6	2	4	22	15	+7	14		4–2	2–1	2–2		1–1	3–0	0–3
5	Persifa Fakfak (Note: Persifa Fakfak were deducted three points after failing to attend a match on 15 August.)	12	3	4	5	11	18	−7	10		0–4	1–1	2–0	1–3		2–0	2–1
6	Yahukimo	12	2	1	9	5	18	−13	7		0–2	0–1	0–1	0–3	0–0		3–1
7	Perseka Kaimana (Note: Perseka Kaimana were deducted three points after failing to attend a match on 23 August, and were relegated.) (R)	12	3	1	8	9	21	−12	7	Relegation to 2015 Liga Nusantara	2–1	0–0	0–3 (Note: Perseka Kaimana forfeited after they failed to appear for the match against PSBS Biak Numfor on 23 August 2014.)	0–4	2–1	0–1	

Updated to match(es) played on 30 August 2014. Source: 2014 Premier Division table and 2014 Premier Division results
Rules for classification: 1) points; 2) goal difference; 3) number of goals scored.
(R) Relegated

== Second round ==
This round begin on 2 September 2014 and will end on 28 September 2014. Sixteen teams compete in this round.

=== Group J ===
Pos	Team	Pld	W	D	L	GF	GA	GD	Pts	Qualification	SMG	PSCS	PDFC	KABO
1	PSIS	6	4	1	1	12	6	+6	13	Advances to Third round		1–0	2–1	5–1
2	PSCS Cilacap	6	3	1	2	8	6	+2	10	Advances to Third round	3–1		1–0	2–0
3	Pro Duta	6	2	1	3	8	8	0	7		1–1	3–1		3–2
4	Persikabo Bogor	6	1	1	4	5	13	−8	4		0–2	1–1	1–0	

Updated to match(es) played on 24 September 2014. Source: 2014 Premier Division table and 2014 Premier Division results
Rules for classification: 1) points; 2) goal difference; 3) number of goals scored.

=== Group K ===
Pos	Team	Pld	W	D	L	GF	GA	GD	Pts	Qualification	SOL	PSGC	BGK	RIA
1	Persis	6	3	1	2	14	10	+4	10	Advances to Third round		5–2	3–0	4–1
2	PSGC Ciamis	6	2	2	2	11	13	−2	8	Advances to Third round	1–1		1–0	3–2
3	PS Bangka	6	2	2	2	8	9	−1	8		3–1	2–2		0–0
4	PSPS Riau	6	2	1	3	11	12	−1	7		3–0	3–2	2–3	

Updated to match(es) played on 28 September 2014. Source: 2014 Premier Division table and 2014 Premier Division results
Rules for classification: 1) points; 2) goal difference; 3) number of goals scored.

=== Group L ===
Pos	Team	Pld	W	D	L	GF	GA	GD	Pts	Qualification	PSS	MTP	GUBI	PSBY
1	PSS	6	4	0	2	11	6	+5	12	Advances to Third round		1–0	3–0	2–0
2	Martapura	6	3	2	1	10	7	+3	11	Advances to Third round	4–3		1–1	3–1
3	Persigubin	6	2	3	1	6	5	+1	9		1–0	1–1		3–0
4	Persewangi Banyuwangi	6	0	1	5	2	11	−9	1		1–2	0–1	0–0	

Updated to match(es) played on 24 September 2014. Source: 2014 Premier Division table and 2014 Premier Division results
Rules for classification: 1) points; 2) goal difference; 3) number of goals scored.

=== Group M ===
Pos	Team	Pld	W	D	L	GF	GA	GD	Pts	Qualification	BOR	PWA	NGW	SEBO
1	Pusamania Borneo	6	4	1	1	16	5	+11	13	Advances to Third round		3–0	5–1	5–1
2	Persiwa	6	4	1	1	15	8	+7	13	Advances to Third round	2–0		3–3	6–0
3	Persinga Ngawi	6	1	3	2	7	11	−4	6		1–1	0–1		1–0
4	Persebo Bondowoso	6	0	1	5	4	18	−14	1		0–2	2–3	1–1	

Updated to match(es) played on 24 September 2014. Source: 2014 Premier Division table and 2014 Premier Division results
Rules for classification: 1) points; 2) goal difference; 3) number of goals scored.

== Third round ==
The group winners and runners-up from the second round will be divided into two groups. Matches will start on 3 October 2014 and will end on 20 November 2014. Eight teams compete in this round.

=== Group N ===
Pos	Team	Pld	W	D	L	GF	GA	GD	Pts	Qualification
1	PSS (Note: PSS Sleman and PSIS Semarang were disqualified for match-fixing and bringing the game into disrepute after they scored five own goals in their last match to avoid playing Pusamania Borneo FC in the semifinals.)	6	4	2	0	13	6	+7	14	Disqualified
2	PSIS	6	3	2	1	16	8	+8	11	Disqualified
3	PSGC Ciamis (Note: PSGC Ciamis were deducted three points after failing to attend their match on 26 October 2014.)	6	1	1	4	6	13	−7	1	Advances to Knock-out stage
4	Persiwa (Note: Persiwa Wamena were deducted three points after failing to attend their match on 18 October 2014.)	6	1	1	4	4	12	−8	1	Advances to Knock-out stage

Updated to match(es) played on 14 November 2014. Source: 2014 Premier Division table
Rules for classification: 1) points; 2) goal difference; 3) number of goals scored.

=== Group P ===
Pos	Team	Pld	W	D	L	GF	GA	GD	Pts	Qualification
1	Martapura	6	3	2	1	8	7	+1	11	Advances to Knock-out stage
2	Pusamania Borneo	6	3	1	2	14	6	+8	10	Advances to Knock-out stage
3	PSCS Cilacap	6	2	1	3	7	9	−2	7	
4	Persis	6	1	2	3	5	12	−7	5	

Updated to match(es) played on 20 November 2014. Source: 2014 Premier Division table
Rules for classification: 1) points; 2) goal difference; 3) number of goals scored.

== Knock-out stage ==
Gelora Delta Stadium will host both semifinals and the final match. Semifinal matches will be played on November 24, 2014, and the final on November 27, 2014.

=== Bracket ===
Semi-finals
24 November – Sidoarjo
PSGC Ciamis	0 (1)
Pusamania Borneo (p)	0 (3)
24 November – Sidoarjo
Martapura	0
Persiwa Wamena	1

Final
27 November – Sidoarjo
Pusamania Borneo	2
Persiwa Wamena	1

=== Semifinals ===
Team 1	Score	Team 2
Martapura	0–1	Persiwa Wamena
PSGC Ciamis	0–0 (1–3 p)	Pusamania Borneo

=== Final ===
Team 1	Score	Team 2
Pusamania Borneo	2–1	Persiwa Wamena

== Champions ==
Premier Division 2014 winner

== Achievement ==
Best Player	Top Goalscorer
(Liberia) Sengbah Kennedy	(Liberia) Yao Rudy Abblude

== Season statistics ==
Update for match played on 27 November 2014

=== Goalscorers ===
Rank	Player	Club	Goals
1	(Liberia) Yao Rudy Abblode	Persiwa Wamena	17
2	(Sierra Leone) Brima Pepito	Martapura FC	16
3	(Argentina) Fernando Gaston Soler	Pusamania Borneo F.C.	15
4	(Indonesia) Hari Nur Yulianto	PSIS Semarang	14
5	(Indonesia) Slamet Hariyadi	Persinga Ngawi	13
5	(Argentina) Julio Alcorsé	PSIS Semarang	13
5	(Liberia) Roberto Kwateh	PSCS Cilacap	13
5	(Indonesia) Febri Setiadi Hamzah	Pusamania Borneo F.C.	13

=== Own goals ===
Player	For	Club
(Indonesia) Julia Mardianus	Persipon Pontianak	PSCS Cilacap
(Indonesia) Agus Suprianto	Persipon Pontianak	Persika Karawang
(Indonesia) Ahmad Yani	PSPS Pekanbaru	Persiraja Banda Aceh
(Indonesia) Donny Irvana	Persisko Merangin	Villa 2000
(Indonesia) Noldy Adrian	Persbul Buol	Persigo Gorontalo
(Indonesia) Abdul Gani Pelupessy	PS Bengkulu	Villa 2000
(Indonesia) Ade Suhendra	Persikabo Bogor	Persih Tembilahan
(Indonesia) Ali Mustofa	Persis Solo	Persiku Kudus
(Indonesia) Yuanugerah	Persigo Gorontalo	Persekam Metro

=== Hat–tricks ===
Player	For	Against	Result	Date
(Indonesia) Agus Salim	Persipasi Bekasi	Persipon Pontianak	3–2	26 April 2014
(Indonesia) Slamet Hariyadi	Persinga Ngawi	Perseman Manokwari	4–2	29 April 2014
(Indonesia) Tommy Oropka	Perseman Manokwari	Persenga Nganjuk	5–1	18 May 2014
(Indonesia) Indra Gunawan	Persipon Pontianak	Persibangga Purbalingga	4–2	4 June 2014
(Indonesia) Ahmad Ihwan	PSPS Pekanbaru	PSAP Sigli	6–0	8 June 2014
(Indonesia) Hari Nur Yulianto	PSIS Semarang	PSGC Ciamis	4–2	12 Oktober 2014
(Indonesia) Hari Nur Yulianto	PSIS Semarang	Persiwa Wamena	5–0	22 Oktober 2014

=== Scoring ===
- First goal of the season: Benhard Larawo for Persifa Fak-fak against Persidafon Dafonsoro (15 April 2014)
- Last goal of the season: for against
- Fastest goal of the season: 1 minutes – Ali Usman for Persebo Bondowoso against Persbul Buol (26 April 2014)
- Widest winning margin: 6 goals
  - PSPS Pekanbaru 6–0 PSAP Sigli (8 June 2014)
- Highest scoring game: 7 goals
  - Perseta Tulungagung 4–3 Persekap Pasuruan (22 April 2014)
- Most goals scored in a match by a single team: 6 goals
  - PSPS Pekanbaru 6–0 PSAP Sigli (8 June 2014)
- Most goals scored in a match by a losing team: 3 goals
  - Perseta Tulungagung 4–3 Persekap Pasuruan (22 April 2014)
- Widest home winning margin: 6 goals
  - PSPS Pekanbaru 6–0 PSAP Sigli (8 June 2014)
- Widest away winning margin: 4 goals
  - Perseka Kaimana 0–4 Persewon Wondama (19 April 2014)
  - Persipasi Bekasi 0–4 Persika Karawang (10 May 2014)
- Most goals scored by a home team: 6 goals
  - PSPS Pekanbaru 6–0 PSAP Sigli (8 June 2014)
- Most goals scored by an away team: 4 goals
  - Perseka Kaimana 0–4 Persewon Wondama (19 April 2014)
  - Persipasi Bekasi 0–4 Persika Karawang (10 May 2014)

=== Clean sheets ===
- Most clean sheets: 6
  - PS Kwarta
- Fewest clean sheets: 0
  - Deltras Sidoarjo
  - Perseka Kaimana
  - Persisko Merangin
  - Persitema Temanggung
  - PPSM Sakti Magelang

== Teams by province ==
	Province	Number of teams	Teams
1	East Java	14	Deltras, Madiun Putra, Mojokerto Putra, Persebo, Persekam Metro, Persekap, Persenga, Perseta, Persewangi, Persid, Persida, Persinga, PSBI and PSBK
2	Central Java	11	Persibangga, Persiku, Persip, Persipur, Persires, Persis, Persitema, PPSM, PSCS, PSIR and PSIS
3	West Java	6	Persika, Persikab, Persikabo, Persikad, Persipasi and PSGC
4	(Papua (province)) Papua	5	Persidafon, Persigubin, Persiwa, PSBS and Yahukimo
5	North Sumatra	4	Bintang Jaya, Pro Duta, Kwarta and PSMS
5	(West Papua (province)) West Papua	4	Perseka, Perseman, Persewon, and Persifa
6	Aceh	3	PSAP, Persiraja, and PSBL
6	Riau	2	Persih and PSPS
6	(Special Region of Yogyakarta) Yogyakarta	2	PSIM and PSS
8	Bangka Belitung	1	Bangka
8	Banten	1	Villa 2000
8	Bengkulu	1	Bengkulu
8	Central Kalimantan	1	Persepar
8	Central Sulawesi	1	Persbul
8	Gorontalo	1	Persigo
8	Jakarta	1	Persitara
8	Jambi	1	Persisko
8	East Kalimantan	1	Pusamania Borneo FC
8	South Kalimantan	1	Martapura
8	West Kalimantan	1	Persipon
8	West Nusa Tenggara	1	Sumbawa Barat
