= 2011–12 Indonesian Premier Division =

Indonesian Premier Division
- Season: 2011–12
- Champions: Persepar Palangkaraya
- Promoted: Group 1 : Pro Duta FC; Group 2 : Persepar Palangkaraya; Group 3 : Perseman Manokwari
- Relegated: Persikota Tangerang; PSP Padang; Gresik United
- Matches: 227
- Goals: 509 (2.24 per match)
- Top goalscorer: 11 goals Abel Cielo
- Biggest home win: Persis Solo 5–0 PSCS Cilacap; Persik Kediri 5–0 PPSM Magelang
- Biggest away win: PSP Padang 0–3 PSLS Lhokseumawe
- Highest scoring: PSS Sleman 6–3 Persepar Palangkaraya
- Longest winning run: Persires Bali Devata (3)
- Longest unbeaten run: Pro Duta FC (7)
- Longest winless run: Gresik United (14)
- Longest losing run: PSP Padang (6)

The 2011–12 Liga Indonesia Premier Division season is the seventeenth edition of Indonesian Premier Division since its establishment in 1994. The competition is managed by PT Liga Prima Indonesia Sportindo (LPIS).

The participant initially consists of 36 clubs but later reduced to only 28 clubs, divided into three groups.

== Teams ==
=== Stadium and locations ===
Club	City	Province	Stadium	Capacity	2010–11 season
Gresik United (Note: The club also listed as 2011-12 Indonesia Super League participant.)	Gresik Regency	East Java	Petrokimia	25,000	5th in 2010–11 Premier Division
Madiun Putra	Madiun Regency	East Java	Wilis	30,000	6th in 2010 First Division
Persbul Buol	Buol Regency	Central Sulawesi	Kuonoto	8,000	2nd in 2010 First Division
Persemalra Maluku Tenggara	Southeast Maluku	Maluku	Maren	7,000	10th in Group 2 2010–11 Premier Division
Perseman Manokwari	Manokwari Regency	West Papua	Sanggeng	15,000	4th in Group 2 2010–11 Premier Division
Persepar Palangkaraya	Palangkaraya	Central Kalimantan	Tuah Pahoe	7,000	3rd in Group E Second stage 2010 First Division
Persewangi Banyuwangi	Banyuwangi Regency	East Java	Diponegoro	20,000	7th in 2010 First Division
Persik Kediri	Kediri	East Java	Brawijaya	15,000	6th in Group 2 2010–11 Premier Division
Persikab Bandung	Bandung Regency	West Java	Jalak Harupat	40,000	7th in Group 2 2010–11 Premier Division
Persikabo Bogor	Bogor Regency	West Java	Persikabo	12,000	8th in Group 1 2010–11 Premier Division
Persikota Tangerang	Tangerang	Banten	Benteng	20,000	12th in Group 2 2010–11 Premier Division
Persipasi Bekasi	Bekasi; East Jakarta	West Java; Jakarta	Patriot; Ciracas	2,500	5th in Group 1 2010–11 Premier Division
Persipro Probolinggo	Probolinggo Regency	East Java	Bayuangga	15,000	9th in Group 3 2010–11 Premier Division
Persires Bali Devata	Gianyar Regency	Bali	Kapten Dipta	15,000	13th in Group 1 2010–11 Premier Division
Persis Solo (Note: The club also listed as 2011–12 Premier Division (LI) participant.)	Surakarta	Central Java	Manahan	35,000	13th in Group 2 2010–11 Premier Division
Persitara Jakarta Utara	North Jakarta	Jakarta	Tugu	10,000	7th in Group 1 2010–11 Premier Division
PPSM Kartika Nusantara	Magelang Regency	Central Java	Madya	35,000	11th in Group 2 2010–11 Premier Division
Pro Duta FC	Medan	North Sumatra	Teladan	20,000	11th in Group 1 2010–11 Premier Division
PS Bengkulu	Bengkulu	Bengkulu	Semarak	10,000	10th in Group 1 2010–11 Premier Division
PSBI Blitar	Blitar	East Java	Aryo Srengat	6,000	3rd in Group 3 2010–11 Premier Division
PSBL Langsa	Langsa	Aceh	Langsa	8,000	4th in 2010 First Division
PSCS Cilacap	Cilacap	Central Java	Wijaya Kusuma	10,000	9th in Group 2 2010–11 Premier Division
PSIR Rembang	Rembang Regency	Central Java	Krida	7,000	11th in Group 3 2010–11 Premier Division
PSIS Semarang	Semarang	Central Java	Jatidiri	25,000	8th in Group 2 2010–11 Premier Division
PSLS Lhokseumawe	Lhokseumawe	Aceh	Tunas Bangsa	12,000	9th in Group 1 2010–11 Premier Division
PSP Padang	Padang	West Sumatra	Agus Salim	28,000	4th in Group A Second stage 2010 First Division
PSS Sleman	Sleman Regency	Yogyakarta	Maguwoharjo	30,000	10th in Group 3 2010–11 Premier Division
PSSB Bireuen	Bireuën Regency	Aceh	Dimurthala	10,000	12th in Group 1 2010–11 Premier Division

=== Personnel and kit ===
Note: Flags indicate national team as has been defined under FIFA eligibility rules. Players and Managers may hold more than one non-FIFA nationality.

Team	Coach	Captain	Kit manufacturer	Shirt sponsor
Group 1
Persikabo Bogor	Suimin Diharja	Tugihadi		
Persikota Tangerang	Izak J. Doddy Sahetapy	Bakri Umarela		
Persitara Jakarta Utara	Agus Suryanto	Gendut Doni Christiawan		
Pro Duta FC	Roberto Bianchi	Antonio Soldevilla	Umbro	
PS Bengkulu	Khairul Sopian	Taufik Siregar		
PSBL Langsa	Amrustian	Ahmad Junaidi		
PSLS Lhokseumawe	Nasrul Koto	Mahdi Sulaiman		
PSP Padang	Zulkifli Jamal	Ardian		
PSSB Bireuen	Simón Elissetche	Zoel Fadhli		
Group 2
Persepar Palangkaraya	Agus Sutiono	Ahmad Faizal	Adidas	
Persik Kediri	Djoko Malis Mustafa	Oliver Makor		GGInterSport
Persikab Bandung	Encang Ibrahim	Cahya Sumirat	Vilour	
Persipasi Bekasi	Warta Kusuma	Mansyur		
Persis Solo	Junaidi	Javier Roca	mitre	
PPSM Kartika Nusantara	Danurwindo	Kurniawan Dwi Yulianto	mitre	
PSCS Cilacap	Vacant	Taryono		PT. BMS
PSIR Rembang	Hariyanto	Efendi		
PSIS Semarang	Gusnul Yakin	Victor de Souza	mitre	Wawasan
PSS Sleman	Widiantoro	Andrid Wibowo		
Group 3
Gresik United	Sasi Kirono	Peter Lipede		
Madiun Putra FC	Hanafi	Windu Wibowo		
Persbul Buol	Kamaludin	Munawir Basri		
Persemalra Maluku Tenggara	Ritham Madubun	Andreas Kaanubun		
Perseman Manokwari	John Castro	Izaac Mansawan	Vilour	
Persewangi Banyuwangi	Yudi Suryata	Victor da Silva		
Persipro Probolinggo	Jefry Sastra	Khoirul Huda		
Persires Bali Devata	Edward Tjong	Adolphus Nagbe		
PSBI Blitar	M. Arifin	Berta Yuana		

=== Managerial changes ===
Team	Outgoing manager	Manner of departure	Date of vacancy	Position in table	Incoming manager	Date of appointment
PSSB Bireuen	Bachtiar Juli	Mutual consent	February 2012		Simón Elissetche	February 2012
PSIS Semarang	Edy Paryono	Resigned	April 2012		Gusnul Yakin	April 2012
PSCS Cilacap	Jessy Mustamu	Signed by PSAP Sigli	May 2012		Vacant	

=== Foreign player ===
==== Group 1 ====
Club	Visa 1	Visa 2	Visa 3	Non-Visa Foreign
Persikabo Bogor	(Moldova) Eduard Valuta	(Cameroon) Cyril Tchana	(Sierra Leone) Brima Pepito	None
Persikota Tangerang	(Serbia) Dušan Bogdanović	None	None	None
Persitara Jakarta Utara	(Argentina) Juan Cortez	None	None	None
Pro Duta	(Morocco) Abdelhadi Laakkad	(Spain) Antonio Soldevilla	(Spain) Xavi Pérez	None
PS Bengkulu	None	None	None	None
PSBL Langsa	(Mali) Maussa Traoré	(Cameroon) Christian Bekatal	None	None
PSLS Lhokseumawe	(Argentina) Carlos Sciucatti	(Cameroon) Georges Malock	None	None
PSP Padang	None	None	None	None
PSSB Bireun	None	None	None	None

==== Group 2 ====
Club	Visa 1	Visa 2	Visa 3	Non-Visa Foreign
Persepar Palangkaraya	(Liberia) Roberto Kwateh	(Nigeria) George Oyebedo	(Nigeria) Ibi Kingsley	None
Persik Kediri	(Brazil) Almiro Valadares	(Brazil) Anderson Da Silva	(Liberia) Oliver Makor	None
Persikab Bandung	(Nigeria) Angel Ebus	None	None	None
Persipasi Bekasi	(Brazil) Wallance Rodrigues	None	None	None
Persis Solo	(Nigeria) Michael Ndubuisi	(Chile) Javier Roca	(Paraguay) Arnaldo Villalba	None
PPSM Magelang	(Paraguay) Christian Rene	(Liberia) Josiah Seton	(France) Kévin Yann	None
PSCS Cilacap	(South Korea) Lee Su-Hyong	(Cameroon) Mahop Guy	(Cameroon) Roger Batoum	None
PSIR	(Cameroon) Christian Lenglolo	(Argentina) Leonardo Felicia	(Nigeria) Gervais Ngana	None
PSIS	(South Korea) Han Ji-Ho	(Brazil) Vitor Borges	(Italy) Raffaele Quintieri	None
PSS	(Cameroon) Bruno Casimir	(Cameroon) Charles Orock	None	None

==== Group 3 ====
Club	Visa 1	Visa 2	Visa 3	Non-Visa Foreign
Persegres	(Liberia) Daouda Sylla	(Cameroon) Augustin Mbon	(Nigeria) Peter Lipede	None
Madiun Putra FC	(Paraguay) Alberto Paredes	None	None	None
Persbul Buol	None	None	None	None
Persemalra Maluku Tenggara	None	None	None	None
Perseman Manokwari	(Liberia) Alex Robinson	(Liberia) Abiel Cielo	(Cameroon) Nnana Onana	None
Persewangi Banyuwangi	(Brazil) Victor da Silva	None	None	None
Persipro Bondowoso United	(Guinea) Mbemba Sylla	(Cameroon) Salomon Bengondo	None	None
Persires Bali Devata	(Liberia) Adolphus Nagbe	(Australia) Joshua Maguire	(Italy) Alessandro Beccaria	None
PSBI Blitar	(Paraguay) Alberto Paredes	None	None	None

== Group 1 ==
Pos	Team	Pld	W	D	L	GF	GA	GD	Pts	Promotion or qualification
1	Pro Duta (Note: Group champions also qualified for the 2011–12 Premier Division Grand Final.) (P)	14	11	1	2	19	6	+13	34	Promotion to 2013 Indonesian Premier League
2	PSLS Lhokseumawe	14	11	0	3	22	11	+11	33	Qualification for 2012–13 Indonesian Premier League Playoffs
3	Persikabo Bogor	15	8	6	1	18	5	+13	30	Move to 2013 Liga Indonesia Premier Division
4	PSBL Langsa	15	6	5	4	19	12	+7	23	Move to 2013 Liga Indonesia Premier Division
5	PSSB Bireun	15	5	3	7	19	18	+1	18	
6	Persitara Jakarta Utara	15	4	5	6	16	19	−3	17	
7	Persikota Tangerang	15	3	1	11	7	23	−16	10	Team disbanded later
8	PS Bengkulu (Note: PS Bengkulu not continue with the rest of the season due to financial problems.)	8	1	3	4	4	12	−8	6	Team disbanded later
9	PSP Padang	15	1	2	12	5	26	−21	5	

Updated to match(es) played on 2 June 2012. Source: 2011–12 Premier Division table
Rules for classification: 1) points; 2) goal difference; 3) number of goals scored.
(P) Promoted

=== Results ===
Home \ Away	KABO	KOTA	PSTR	PDFC	PSBU	PSBL	PSLS	PSPP	PSSB
Persikabo Bogor		1–0	1–0			1–0			2–2
Persikota Tangerang			1–1				3–0		2–1
Persitara Jakarta Utara					0–0	2–2		3–1	1–0
Pro Duta	0–0	3–1	2–0		2–0				
PS Bengkulu	0–0					2–2		1–0	1–3
PSBL Langsa		2–0		0–1			2–0	2–0	
PSLS Lhokseumawe	1–0	1–0	5–2	1–0	2–0				
PSP Padang	0–2	1–0		0–2			0–3		
PSSB Bireun				0–1		1–1	0–1	3–0	

Updated to match(es) played on 11 March 2012. Source: IPL
Legend: Blue = home team win; Yellow = draw; Red = away team win.

== Group 2 ==
Pos	Team	Pld	W	D	L	GF	GA	GD	Pts	Promotion or qualification
1	Persepar Palangkaraya (Note: Group champions also qualified for the 2011–12 Premier Division Grand Final.) (P)	18	10	3	5	27	23	+4	33	Promotion to 2013 Indonesian Premier League
2	PSIR	18	9	3	6	18	16	+2	30	Qualification for 2012–13 Indonesian Premier League Playoffs
3	Persik Kediri	18	8	4	6	33	26	+7	28	Move to 2013 Liga Indonesia Premier Division
4	PSCS Cilacap	18	8	4	6	19	23	−4	28	Move to 2013 Liga Indonesia Premier Division
5	PSIS	18	8	3	7	26	18	+8	27	
6	Persipasi Bekasi	18	8	3	7	24	23	+1	27	
7	PSS	18	7	5	6	29	21	+8	26	
8	Persis Solo	18	6	5	7	26	21	+5	23	
9	Persikab Bandung	18	5	6	7	20	25	−5	21	
10	PPSM Magelang	18	2	2	14	17	43	−26	8	

Updated to match(es) played on 2 June 2012. Source: 2011–12 Premier Division table
Rules for classification: 1) points; 2) goal difference; 3) number of goals scored.
(P) Promoted

=== Results ===
Home \ Away	PPAR	PSIK	PSBD	PASI	SOL	PPSM	PSCS	REM	SMG	PSS
Persepar Palangkaraya		2–1			1–0	4–0	2–1		1–0	
Persik Kediri				3–1	1–0	5–0	1–1			2–2
Persikab Bandung	2–2	0–1			2–1	2–0		2–1		1–0
Persipasi Bekasi	3–1		1–0		0–0		3–2	2–0	5–2	
Persis Solo		2–1		3–0			5–0	2–2		1–1
PPSM Magelang		3–2	2–2	1–2	2–3				3–2	2–2
PSCS Cilacap	1–1		1–1	2–1		1–0		1–0	1–0	1–0
PSIR	1–0	2–2		2–0		1–0	1–0		1–0	
PSIS	2–0	3–0	2–0		1–0			3–0		2–1
PSS	6–3	4–1	2–1	3–1				0–0	0–0	

Updated to match(es) played on 14 April 2012. Source: IPL
Legend: Blue = home team win; Yellow = draw; Red = away team win.

== Group 3 ==
Pos	Team	Pld	W	D	L	GF	GA	GD	Pts	Promotion or relegation
1	Perseman Manokwari (Note: Group champions also qualified for the 2011–12 Premier Division Grand Final.) (P)	16	12	3	1	37	9	+28	39	Promotion to 2013 Indonesian Premier League
2	Persbul Buol	16	9	0	7	26	18	+8	27	Move to 2013 Liga Indonesia Premier Division
3	PSBI Blitar	16	8	3	5	22	23	−1	27	
4	Persipro Bondowoso United	16	7	2	7	15	17	−2	23	
5	Persires Bali Devata	15	6	3	6	9	11	−2	21	
6	Madiun Putra FC	16	5	5	6	14	20	−6	20	Move to 2013 Liga Indonesia Premier Division
7	Persewangi Banyuwangi (R)	15	5	4	6	5	15	−10	19	Relegation to 2012–13 Liga Indonesia First Division
8	Persemalra Maluku Tenggara	15	5	4	6	10	21	−11	19	
9	Gresik United	15	1	2	12	0	32	−32	5	Team disbanded later

Updated to match(es) played on 2 June 2012. Source: 2011–12 Premier Division table
Rules for classification: 1) points; 2) goal difference; 3) number of goals scored.
(P) Promoted; (R) Relegated

=== Results ===
Home \ Away	GU	MPFC	BUOL	PMLR	PSMN	PSBY	PPRO	PRBD	PSBI
Gresik United		3–4					0–1	3–1	
Madiun Putra FC	1–1					0–1	1–0	1–0	4–2
Persbul Buol		2–0		4–0	0–1				
Persemalra Maluku Tenggara	1–1	2–2			0–0				2–0
Perseman Manokwari	2–1	1–0					4–1		5–1
Persewangi Banyuwangi	1–0		2–1	2–1	1–1				
Persipro Bondowoso United			2–0	0–2		1–0		1–0	
Persires Bali Devata			3–0	1–0	2–0	1–0			
PSBI Blitar			3–1			1–0	2–0	0–1	

Updated to match(es) played on 11 March 2012. Source: IPL
Legend: Blue = home team win; Yellow = draw; Red = away team win.

== Grand Finals ==
Three champion clubs from each group at 2011–12 Premier Division will be met in the final round which will begin and held in 1 to 5 July 2012 ahead. The third club is Pro Duta FC who won the Group 1, Group 2 champion Persepar Palangkaraya, and Perseman Manokwari winner of Group 3.

Drawing Competition 2011–12 Premier Division final round was held at the Office of PT Liga Prima Indonesia Sportindo (LPIS) in Jakarta, Wednesday, 20 June afternoon. The drawing was also attended by Deputy Secretary-General of PSSI Saleh Ismail Mukadar, CEO LPIS Widjajanto, and Hendriyana, Head of Competition LPIS. While the three clubs who attend each represented by Handoyo Subosito (Pro Duta FC), Warda Rocky M. Dahan (Persepar Palangkaraya), and Hendrik Renjaan (Perseman Manokwari).

=== Table ===
Pos	Team	Pld	W	D	L	GF	GA	GD	Pts
1	Persepar Palangkaraya (C)	2	1	1	0	1	0	+1	4
2	Pro Duta	2	0	2	0	1	1	0	2
3	Perseman Manokwari	2	0	1	1	1	2	−1	1

Updated to match(es) played on 5 July 2012. Source: 2011–12 Premier Division table
Rules for classification: 1) points; 2) goal difference; 3) number of goals scored.
(C) Champions

=== Results ===
1 July 2012
15:30 WIB

Pro Duta FC	1–1	Perseman Manokwari
Irwansyah 3'	Report	19' Cielo

Si Jalak Harupat Stadium, Bandung Regency
3 July 2012
15:30 WIB

Perseman Manokwari	0–1	Persepar Palangkaraya
	Report	68' Kwateh

Si Jalak Harupat Stadium, Bandung Regency
Referee: R.A. Mas Agus
5 July 2012
15:30 WIB

Persepar Palangkaraya	0–0	Pro Duta FC
	Report

Si Jalak Harupat Stadium, Bandung Regency
Referee: Nopendri

== Champions ==
Champions

== Season statistics ==
=== Top scorers ===
==== All round top scorers ====
Rank	Player	Club	Goals
1	Abiel Cielo Quioh	Perseman Manokwari	11
2	Ahmad Faizal	Persepar Palangkaraya	10
2	Charles Orock	PSS Sleman	10
4	Cristian Lenglolo	PSIR Rembang	9
5	Faris Aditama	Persik Kediri	8
5	Oliver Makor	Persik Kediri	8
5	Vitor Borges de Souza	PSIS Semarang	8
5	Carlos Raul Sciucatti	PSLS Lhokseumawe	8
5	Mahdi Sulaiman	PSLS Lhokseumawe	8

==== Top scorer by group ====
goals scored in grand-final are not included

Group 1
Rank	Player	Club	Goals
1	Carlos Raul Sciucatti	PSLS Lhokseumawe	8
1	Mahdi Sulaiman	PSLS Lhokseumawe	8
3	Gendut Doni Christiawan	Persikota Tangerang	6
3	Ghozali Muharam Siregar	Pro Duta FC	6
5	Zoel Fadli	PSSB Bireuen	5
6	Brima Pepito Sanusie	Persikabo Bogor	4
6	Jibby Wuwungan	Persikabo Bogor	4
6	Abdelhadi Laakkad	Pro Duta FC	4
6	Cristian Bekatal	PSBL Langsa	4
6	Mamadou Lamara Diallo	PSBL Langsa	4

Group 2
Rank	Player	Club	Goals
1	Ahmad Faizal	Persepar Palangkaraya	10
1	Charles Orock	PSS Sleman	10
3	Cristian Lenglolo	PSIR Rembang	9
4	Faris Aditama	Persik Kediri	8
4	Oliver Makor	Persik Kediri	8
4	Vitor Borges de Souza	PSIS Semarang	8
7	Wallace Rodrigues da Silva	Persipasi Bekasi	7
8	Cahya Sumirat	Persikab Bandung	6
8	Komang Mariawan	Persik Kediri	6
8	Ferriyanto	Persis Solo	6

Group 3
Rank	Player	Club	Goals
1	Abiel Cielo Quioh	Perseman Manokwari	10
2	Izaac Mansawan	Perseman Manokwari	6
3	Daouda Sylla	Gresik United	5
3	Windu Wibowo	Madiun Putra FC	5
3	Masrul	PSBI Blitar	5
3	Purwanto	PSBI Blitar	5
7	Lukas Latuperisa	Perseman Manokwari	4
7	Mbemba Sylla	Persipro Bond-U	4
9	Andi Purnomo	Persipro Bond-U	3
9	Alessandro Beccaria	Persires Bali Devata	3
