= Bayu Pradana =

Indonesian footballer

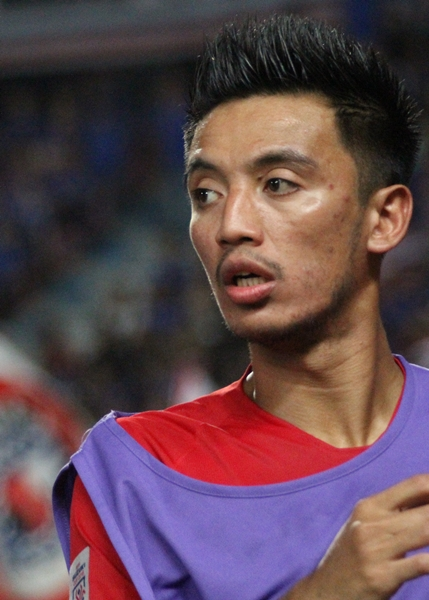
- Bayu Pradana with Indonesia at the 2018 AFF Championship

Personal information
- Full name: Bayu Pradana Andriatmoko
- Date of birth: 19 April 1991 (age 35)
- Place of birth: Salatiga, Indonesia
- Height: 1.80 m (5 ft 11 in)
- Position: Defensive midfielder

Team information
- Current team: Barito Putera
- Number: 13

Youth career
- Diklat Salatiga

Senior career*
Years	Team	Apps	(Gls)
2010−2011	Persis Solo	7	(1)
2011−2012	Persipasi Bekasi	18	(0)
2013–2014	Persepar Palangkaraya	35	(9)
2015	Persiba Balikpapan	1	(0)
2016−2019	Mitra Kukar	74	(5)
2019−	Barito Putera	154	(9)

International career
2013	Indonesia U23	1	(0)
2016−2019	Indonesia	23	(0)
Medal record
Men's football
Representing Indonesia
AFF Championship
Runner-up	2016 Myanmar & Philippines	Team
- * Club domestic league appearances and goals as of 3 May 2026

Bayu Pradana Andriatmoko (born 19 April 1991) is an Indonesian professional footballer who plays as a defensive midfielder for Liga 2 club Barito Putera.

== Career statistics ==
=== Club ===
As of match played 3 May 2026

Club	Season	League			Cup (Note: Includes Piala Indonesia)		Other (Note: Appearances in Indonesia President's Cup)		Total	
Club	Season	Division	Apps	Goals	Apps	Goals	Apps	Goals	Apps	Goals
Persis Solo	2010–11	Premier Division	7	1	0	0	0	0	7	1
Persipasi Bekasi	2011–12	Premier Division	18	0	0	0	0	0	18	0
Persepar Palangkaraya	2013	IPL	21	5	0	0	0	0	21	5
Persepar Palangkaraya	2014	Premier Division	14	4	0	0	0	0	14	4
Persepar Palangkaraya	Total		35	9	0	0	0	0	35	9
Persiba Balikpapan	2015	ISL	1	0	0	0	3	3	4	3
Mitra Kukar	2016	ISC A	22	2	0	0	0	0	22	2
Mitra Kukar	2017	Liga 1	27	1	0	0	3	0	30	1
Mitra Kukar	2018	Liga 1	25	2	0	0	4	0	29	2
Mitra Kukar	Total		74	5	0	0	7	0	81	5
Barito Putera	2019	Liga 1	21	0	0	0	3	0	24	0
Barito Putera	2020	Liga 1	1	0	0	0	0	0	1	0
Barito Putera	2021–22	Liga 1	30	4	0	0	4 (Note: Appearances in Menpora Cup)	1	34	5
Barito Putera	2022–23	Liga 1	31	1	0	0	5	0	36	1
Barito Putera	2023–24	Liga 1	30	2	0	0	0	0	30	2
Barito Putera	2024–25	Liga 1	16	0	0	0	0	0	16	0
Barito Putera	2025–26	Championship	25	2	0	0	0	0	25	2
Career total			289	24	0	0	22	4	311	28

=== International ===
As of match played 19 November 2019

Appearances and goals by national team and year
National team	Year	Apps	Goals
Indonesia	2016	11	0
Indonesia	2017	4	0
Indonesia	2018	6	0
Indonesia	2019	2	0
Total		23	0

== Honours ==
=== International ===
Indonesia

- AFF Championship runner-up: 2016

=== Individual ===
- Liga 1 Best XI: 2017
- Indonesia Soccer Championship A Best XI: 2016
- Liga 2 Team of the Season: 2025–26
