= 2013 Indonesian Premier Division (LPIS) =

Liga Indonesia Premier Division
- Season: 2013
- Champions: PSS Sleman

2013 Indonesian Premier Division was the second and the final edition of Indonesian Premier Division organized by LPIS before reverted to be organized by PT.LI. PSS Sleman was the champions but not awarded promotion to 2014 Indonesian Super League.

== Group stage ==
=== Group 1 ===
Pos	Team	Pld	W	D	L	GF	GA	GD	Pts	Qualification
1	Lampung	14	11	2	1	30	8	+22	35	Advanced to Semi-final
2	Persitara Jakarta Utara	15	8	2	5	23	19	+4	26	Advanced to Semi-final
3	PSBL Langsa	16	7	4	5	12	11	+1	25	
4	PSMS Medan	11	7	3	1	22	9	+13	24	
5	Persikab Bandung	16	6	3	7	22	21	+1	21	
6	Persipasi Bekasi	15	6	2	7	19	17	+2	20	
7	Persipon Pontianak	11	4	2	5	14	15	−1	14	
8	PSSB Bireun	16	3	4	9	18	32	−14	13	
9	Persika Karawang	15	3	2	10	14	25	−11	11	
10	PSIS Semarang	11	3	0	8	6	23	−17	9	

Updated to match(es) played on 06 October 2013 (not clear whether the remaining matches were played, but the semifinalists had been decided). Source: Persibangga
Rules for classification: 1) points; 2) goal difference; 3) number of goals scored.

=== Group 2 ===
Pos	Team	Pld	W	D	L	GF	GA	GD	Pts	Qualification
1	PSS Sleman	17	10	4	3	23	15	+8	34	Advanced to Semi-final
2	Persenga Nganjuk	13	9	2	2	29	15	+14	29	Advanced to Semi-final
3	Persekap Pasuruan	15	9	2	4	27	15	+12	29	
4	Persifa Fakfak	16	6	5	5	25	16	+9	23	
5	Persis Solo	13	7	2	4	22	14	+8	23	
6	Persibangga Purbalingga	18	5	6	7	19	27	−8	21	
7	PSBI Blitar	15	4	5	6	15	14	+1	17	
8	Persires Banjarnegara	14	3	5	6	13	18	−5	14	
9	Persemalra Maluku Tenggara	12	4	0	8	12	21	−9	12	
10	Persewon Wondama	12	2	1	9	10	28	−18	7	
11	PPSM Magelang	5	0	0	5	0	12	−12	0	

Updated to match(es) played on 06 October 2013 (not clear whether the remaining matches were played, but the semifinalists had been decided). Source: Persibangga
Rules for classification: 1) points; 2) goal difference; 3) number of goals scored.

== Knockout stage ==
Semi-finals
7 November – Sleman
PSS Sleman	3
Persitara Jakarta Utara	0
7 November – Sleman
Lampung	2
Persenga Nganjuk	0

Final
10 November – Sleman
PSS Sleman	2
Lampung	1
Third place
10 November – Sleman
Persitara Jakarta Utara	4
Persenga Nganjuk	3

=== Venue ===
Maguwoharjo Stadium in Sleman Regency, home base of PSS Sleman, became the host for semi-finals, third place play-off, and final.

=== Semi-finals ===
7 November 2013

PSS Sleman	3–0	Persitara Jakarta Utara

7 November 2013

Lampung	2–0	Persenga Nganjuk

=== Third place play-off ===
10 November 2013

Persitara Jakarta Utara	4–3	Persenga Nganjuk

=== Final ===
10 November 2013

PSS Sleman	2–1	Lampung

== Champion ==
Champion
PSS Sleman
1st title
