= Beccaria =

Beccaria is an Italian surname and place name.

== People ==
- Alessandro Beccaria (born 1988), Italian footballer
- Angelo Beccaria (1820–1897), Italian landscape painter
- Battista Beccario (15th-century), Genoese cartographer
- Cesare Beccaria (1738–1794), Italian jurist and philosopher, argued for abolition of death penalty
- Giovanni Battista Beccaria (1716–1781), Italian physicist
- Ippolito Maria Beccaria (1550–1600), Dominican preacher
- José Manuel Romay Beccaría (born 1934), Spanish lawyer and politician
- Lola Beccaria (born 1963), Spanish writer
- Luisa Beccaria, Italian fashion designer
- Mario Beccaria (1920–2003), Italian politician
- Vania Beccaria (born 1973), Italian volleyball player

== Places ==
- Beccaria Township, Clearfield County, Pennsylvania
- Beccaria, Clearfield County, Pennsylvania, an unincorporated community with the same name as the township
- Montù Beccaria - comune in Province of Pavia, Region of Lombardy, Italy
- Piazza Cesare Beccaria - City square or plaza in Florence, Italy
