= Kim Jong-kyung =

South Korean footballer (born 1982)

Kim Jong-Kyung
Personal information
- Full name: Kim Jong-Kyung
- Date of birth: 9 May 1982 (age 44)
- Place of birth: South Korea
- Height: 1.85 m (6 ft 1 in)
- Position: Defender

Youth career
- Hongik University

Senior career*
Years	Team	Apps	(Gls)
2004–2005	Gwangju Sangmu Bulsajo	8	(0)
2006	Gyeongnam	26	(4)
2007	Jeonbuk Hyundai Motors	18	(1)
2008	Daegu	5	(0)
2009–2010	Persipura Jayapura	3	(0)
2010–2011	Persitara North Jakarta	15	(0)
2011–2012	Batavia Union	16	(1)
- * Club domestic league appearances and goals as of 13 June 2011

Kim Jong-Kyung (Korean: 김종경; born 9 May 1982) is a South Korean former footballer who plays as a defender.

== Club career ==
Kim's first step in professional football in Korea was somewhat unusual; his first club was the military club Gwangju Sangmu Bulsajo, while he fulfilled his military obligations. Typically, players defer their military stint until after they have already established, or have attempted to establish, a professional career to which they can return while they complete their duties.

Following the completion of his military service, Kim moved to Gyeongnam FC for 2006, the club making its debut that year in the K League. A regular starter for Gyeongnam, Kim transferred to Jeonbuk Hyundai Motors for the 2007 season, and once again was a regular starter. For 2008, Kim transferred to Daegu FC for two seasons. However, this was an unsuccessful move, and Kim only played two matches for the club, in the 2008 edition of League Cup

At the conclusion of the 2009 season, Kim moved to Indonesian club Persipura Jayapura, making a start in an AFC Champions League match. Kim then moved to the capital of Indonesia, Jakarta, playing for Persitara in the Indonesian Super League. Following the relegation of Persitara to the Liga Indonesia Premier Division, Kim moved to newly established Batavia United FC to ensure he remained in the Indonesian Super League.
