= Julio Cid =

Chilean footballer (born 1983)

Personal information
- Full name: Julio Eduardo Cid Lagos
- Date of birth: January 11, 1983 (age 43)
- Place of birth: Chillán, Chile
- Height: 1.72 m (5 ft 8 in)
- Position: Midfielder

Senior career*
Years	Team	Apps	(Gls)
- Universidad Católica
- Deportes Puerto Montt
- Curicó Unido
2001	Ñublense		
- Huachipato
2004	Deportes Valdivia		
2007–2008	Colchagua		
2009	Balestier Khalsa FC	11	(0)
2011–2013	Persitara North Jakarta		
2014	Persipon Pontianak		
- * Club domestic league appearances and goals

Julio Eduardo Cid Lagos (born January 11, 1983) is a Chilean former footballer who last played for Persipon Pontianak of the Liga Indonesia Premier Division.

== Career ==
=== In Chile ===
Cid had stints with Universidad Católica, Deportes Puerto Montt, Curicó Unido, Ñublense, Deportes Valdivia, Huachipato and Colchagua before moving abroad.

=== Balestier Khalsa ===
Plying his trade with Balestier Khalsa of the Singapore S.League in 2009, Eduardo suffered an injury while playing for them, forcing him to miss some matches including a 1–4 defeat to Gombak United. Besides that, the Chilean midfielder participated in the 2009 Singapore League Cup, winning his first S.League game in a 2–1 triumph over Young Lions.

During his time in Singapore, Eduardo was sent off once, when he got two straight yellow cards in a 0–0 tie with Sengkang Punggol.

=== Persipon Pontianak ===
Along with Chilean footballer Juan Luis Lillo, Eduardo claimed that Persipon Pontianak owed them eight months' worth of pay. However, when they went to see Edi Rusdi Kamtono, the proprietor of the club, he blatantly stated he did not want to pay them anymore.
