= Roberto Kwateh =

Liberian footballer (born 1974)

Personal information
- Full name: Roberto Saydee Kwateh
- Date of birth: 11 August 1984 (age 42)
- Place of birth: Liberia
- Position: Striker

Senior career*
| Years | Team | Apps | (Gls) |
| 2003 | PSIM Yogyakarta | | |
| 2004 | PSIS Semarang | | |
| 2005 | Persibat Batang | | |
| 2007 | Persiwa Wamena | | |
| 2007 | Persiraja Banda Aceh | | |
| 2008–2010 | PSIR Rembang | | |
| 2010–2011 | Persipasi Bekasi | | |
| 2011–2012 | Persitara North Jakarta | | |
| 2014 | PSCS Cilacap | | |

International career
| 2007 | Liberia | 1 | (0) |
- * Club domestic league appearances and goals

Roberto Saydee Kwateh (born 11 August 1984) is a Liberian former footballer who played as a striker.

== Early life ==
Kwateh was born in 1984 in Liberia. He moved to Indonesia at the age of nineteen.

== Career ==
He played for Indonesian side Kalteng Putra FC. He helped the club win the league.

== Personal life ==
Kwateh has been married to an Indonesian woman. He has three children, including Ronaldo Kwateh.
