= Persbul Buol =

Association football team in Indonesia

Persbul
- Full name: Persatuan Sepakbola Buol
- Nicknames: Coconut Crabs; Pogogul Warriors
- Founded: 1950; 76 years ago
- Ground: Kuonoto Stadium; Buol, Central Sulawesi
- Capacity: 5,000
- Owner: PT. Buol Sportindo
- Chairman: Abdullah Batalipu
- Coach: Jufri Bakri
- League: Liga 4
- 2021: 4th in Group B, (Central Sulawesi zone)
Home colours	Away colours

Persatuan Sepakbola Buol, commonly known as Persbul Buol or Persbul, is an Indonesian football club based in Buol Regency, Central Sulawesi. They currently compete in the Liga 4 Central Sulawesi zone.

== Honours ==
- Liga Indonesia First Division
  - Runner-up (1): 2010

== Season-by-season records ==
Season	League	Tier	Tms.	Pos.	Piala Indonesia
2009–10	Second Division	4		promoted	—
2010	First Division	3	57	2nd	—
2011–12	Premier Division (LPIS)	2	28	2nd, Group 3	Second round
2013	Premier Division	2	39	4th, Group 4	—
2014	Premier Division	2	63	4th, Group 7	—
2015	Premier Division	2	55	did not finish	—
2016	ISC B	2	53	5th, Group 8	—
2017	Liga 2	2	61	6th, Group 8	—
2018	Liga 3	3	32	eliminated in National zone route	Second round
2019					
2020
2021–22	Liga 3	3	64	eliminated in provincial phase	—
2022–23					
2023–24
2024–25
2025–26
