= Ferdi =

Ferdi may refer to:

- Ferdi Elmas (born 1985), Turkish footballer
- Ferdi Hardal (born 1996), Turkish weightlifter
- Ferdi Kadıoğlu (born 1999), Turkish-Dutch footballer
- Ferdi Özbeğen (1941–2013), Turkish-Armenian singer and pianist
- Ferdi Sabit Soyer (born 1952), former de facto Prime Minister of the Turkish Republic of Northern Cyprus
- Ferdi Tayfur (1945–2025), Turkish arabesque singer, actor, and composer
- Ferdi Taygan (born 1956), American tennis player
- Ferdi Zeyrek (1977–2025), Turkish architect and politician
