= Adolphus Nagbe =

Liberian footballer

Adoplphus Nagbe Marshall
Personal information
- Full name: Adolphus Nagbe Marshall
- Date of birth: 21 July 1992 (age 34)
- Place of birth: Monrovia, Liberia
- Position: Defender

Team information
- Current team: Fgura United
- Number: 33

Senior career*
Years	Team	Apps	(Gls)
2008–2009	PSIR Rembang	29	(0)
2009–2010	Deltras Sidoarjo	34	(0)
2010–2012	Persires Bali Devata FC	14	(0)
2012–2015	PS Bangka	32	(0)
2017–2019	Gudja United F.C.	46	(6)
2019–2021	Pembroke Athleta F.C	34	(0)
2022–2023	Naxxar Lions	39	(2)
2023 - current	Fgura United		

International career
2015–2016	Liberia	6	(0)
- * Club domestic league appearances and goals

Adolphus Nagbe Marshall (born 21 July 1992) is a Liberian footballer who plays for Maltese club Fgura United.

== Career ==
=== Indonesia ===
Recalled to PS Bangka early December 2013, Nagbe was described as being good in aerial duels and having the ideal height for a defender while being examined at PSMS Medan. However, he was threatened to be deported due to immigration issues but it never happened.

Provoked and taunted by the PSMS Medan starters on 14 February 2014, the centerback still concentrated on the match they were unable to elicit a reaction from him.

=== Malta ===
Spending 2017–18 with Gudja United, the Liberia international focused on promotion that season and was nominated for the 2nd Division Player of the Year Award.
