= Feri Ariawan =

Indonesian footballer (born 1986)

Personal information
- Full name: Feri Ariawan
- Date of birth: 16 May 1986 (age 40)
- Place of birth: Surabaya, Indonesia
- Height: 1.70 m (5 ft 7 in)
- Positions: Forward; winger

Youth career
- 2007: Sasana Bhakti
- 2008: PON Jatim

Senior career*
Years	Team	Apps	(Gls)
2008−2009	PSIS Semarang	27	(10)
2009−2010	Persiba Balikpapan	32	(7)
2010−2011	Persela Lamongan	26	(3)
2011−2013	Persebaya 1927	28	(5)
2014–2015	Persela Lamongan	20	(0)
2016	PSIS Semarang	31	(2)
Total		164	(27)
- * Club domestic league appearances and goals

Feri Ariawan (born 16 May 1986) is an Indonesian former footballer who played as a forward or winger.
