= Aryo Srengat Stadium =

Stadium in East Java, Indonesia

Coordinates: 8°03′37″S 112°04′20″E

- Interactive map of Aryo Srengat Stadium
- Location: Srengat, Blitar, East Java, Indonesia
- Owner: Blitar Regency
- Operator: Blitar Regency
- Capacity: 800
- Surface: Grass field

Tenant
- PSBI Blitar

Aryo Srengat Stadium is a football stadium in the town of Srengat, Blitar, Indonesia. The stadium has a capacity of 800 people.

It is the home base of PSBI Blitar.
