= Raffaele Simone Quintieri =

Italian footballer

Simone Quintieri
Personal information
- Full name: Raffaele Simone Quintieri
- Date of birth: 16 March 1982 (age 44)
- Place of birth: Cosenza, Italy
- Height: 1.84 m (6 ft 0 in)
- Position: Attacking midfielder

Senior career*
Years	Team	Apps	(Gls)
2006–2008	Lumezzane	12	(0)
2008–2009	Igea Virtus	6	(2)
2009–2010	HinterReggio		
2010–2011	Semarang United		
2011–2013	PSIS Semarang		
2013	Miami United		
2014	Qormi	9	(0)
2015	Sriwijaya		
2015	SPA		
2016	Al Jahra		
- * Club domestic league appearances and goals

Raffaele Simone Quintieri (born 16 March 1982) is an Italian former footballer who plays as an attacking midfielder.

== Career ==
=== United States ===
Captaining Miami United to the 2013 United Premier Soccer League, Quintieri was tasked with securing the championship and doing well at the US Open Cup, stating that the popularity of football there had risen a lot.

=== Malta ===
Registering his first outing as Qormi conceded 5–3 to Hibernians on February 3, 2014, the Italian viewed the Maltese Premier League's quality as good as the Lega Pro in his home country.

=== Malaysia ===
Among the new arrivals at SPA preceding the 2015 Malaysia Premier League, he came across the likes of Senegalese international El Hadji Diouf there, viewing the lifestyle in Malaysia as similar to Europe.

=== Indonesia ===
Greeted by euphoric fans upon arrival to Semarang United, the then 29-year old competed alongside an Angolan, two Australians, and a Brazilian, taking the number 37 jersey and supplying two assists in three matchups. Hoping to reach the first stage of the AFC Champions League, he considered the local standard the same level as the Italian Serie C2. Upon returning to Italy, he stated that he missed his celebrity status in Indonesia.

Aiding Sriwijaya at the 2015 General Sudirman Cup, his transfer was delayed due to injury, but ended up being dropped.

=== Kuwait ===
Putting pen to paper with Al-Jahra preceding the second part of 2015–16, the former Miami United man mixed with a Brazilian and a Cameroonian there, setting a top eight finish as the main goal.
