= Lee Su-hyong =

South Korean footballer

Personal information
- Date of birth: May 14, 1986 (age 40)
- Place of birth: South Korea
- Height: 1.75 m (5 ft 9 in)
- Position: Midfielder

Senior career*
Years	Team	Apps	(Gls)
2007–2009	Ansan Hi FC	12	(2)
2009~2012	PSCS Cilacap	102	(16)
2012~2013	PSPS Pekanbaru	24	(4)
- * Club domestic league appearances and goals as of 10 May 2013

- Lee Su-hyong
- Hangul: 이수형
- RR: I Suhyeong
- MR: I Suhyŏng

Lee Su-hyong (born May 14, 1986) is a South Korean football player previously play for PSPS Pekanbaru in Indonesia Super League.
