= Batavia Union F.C. =

Indonesian football club

- Full name: Batavia Union Football Club
- Nickname: Laskar Si Pitung
- Founded: 2010, named Batavia Union FC
- Dissolved: 2011
- Ground: Tugu Stadium
- Capacity: 4,000
- Owner: PT Batavia Desborough Footballindo
- CEO: (Indonesia) Meiriyon "Yon" Moeis
- Manager: (Indonesia) Sutrisno
- Coach: (Argentina) Gustavo Balvorín
- League: Liga Indonesia Premier Division
- 2011-12: 5th
Home colours

Batavia Union Football Club was an Indonesian football club based in North Jakarta, Jakarta. The team plays in Liga Indonesia Premier Division (LPIS).

== Last squad ==
Note: Flags indicate national team as defined under FIFA eligibility rules; some limited exceptions apply. Players may hold more than one non-FIFA nationality.

No.	Pos.	Nation	Player
22	GK	IDN	Fauzi Toldo
3	DF	IDN	Tugihadi
13	DF	IDN	Ledi Utomo
8	MF	CHI	Javier Rocha
7	MF	KOR	Na Byung-Yul
14	DF	KOR	Kim Jong-Kyung
11	MF	IDN	Muhammad Iskandar
21	FW	ARG	Leandro Scornainchi
9	FW	ARG	Juan Manuel Cortes
10	FW	IDN	Tantan
21	GK	IDN	Syaiful Khabib
31	GK	IDN	Ade Hendra Nasution

No.	Pos.	Nation	Player
33	DF	IDN	Sofyan Morhan
19	DF	IDN	Muhammad Fathulmanan
21	DF	IDN	Saefulloh
15	MF	IDN	Munir Lessy
17	MF	IDN	Mulyani Hadi Kifayah
4	MF	IDN	Muhammad Fahri
27	MF	IDN	Ronny Wahyudi
73	MF	IDN	Basir Arafat
92	FW	IDN	Muhammad Renggur
16	FW	IDN	Yahya Sosomar
99	FW	IDN	Fathul Adha

== Former Coach ==
- (Spain) Roberto Bianchi

== See also ==
- Persitara North Jakarta
