= Alessandro Beccaria =

Italian football player (born 1988)

Alex Beccaria
Personal information
- Full name: Alessandro Beccaria
- Date of birth: 12 June 1988 (age 38)
- Place of birth: Mantua, Italy
- Height: 1.85 m (6 ft 1 in)
- Position: Forward

Senior career*
Years	Team	Apps	(Gls)
2010–2011	Sambonifacese	6	(1)
2011–2012	Bali Devata	18	(10)
2012–2013	Sportfreunde Lotte	7	(0)
2013–2014	SV Wilhelmshaven	8	(1)
2015–2018	A.C. Fabbrico		
2018–2018	Solierese	9	(3)
- * Club domestic league appearances and goals

Alessandro Beccaria (born 12 June 1988) is an Italian footballer who plays as a forward. He previously played for A.C. Sambonifacese in the Lega Pro Seconda Divisione.
