= Vagner Luís =

Brazilian footballer

Vagner Luis
Personal information
- Full name: Vagner Luis de Oliveira Marins
- Date of birth: 3 November 1980 (age 45)
- Place of birth: Rio de Janeiro, Brazil
- Height: 1.80 m (5 ft 11 in)
- Position: Defender

Senior career*
Years	Team	Apps	(Gls)
2000–2007	Villa Rio	115	(8)
2007–2008	Pelita Jaya	31	(1)
2008–2009	PSM Makassar	28	(1)
2009–2010	Persiwa Wamena	29	(2)
2010–2012	PSMS Medan	32	(5)
2012–2014	Busaiteen Club	89	(3)
- * Club domestic league appearances and goals as of 9 July 2014

Vagner Luis de Oliveira Marins (born November 3, 1980) is a Brazilian former footballer who plays as a defender.
