= Hartono =

Hartono can be a given name, a middle name, or a surname. Notable people with the name include:

== Given name ==
- Hartono Rekso Dharsono, Indonesian general

== Middle name ==
- Cindana Hartono Kusuma (born 1976), Indonesian badminton player

== Surname ==
- Arianne Hartono (born 1996), a Dutch tennis player
- Bambang Dwi Hartono (born 1961), Indonesian politician
- Dedi Hartono (born 1987), Indonesian footballer
- Eddy Hartono (born 1964), an Indonesian badminton player
- Heru Budi Hartono, Indonesian politician
- Jaya Hartono, Indonesian football coach
- Michael Bambang Hartono (1939–2026), Indonesian businessman
- Nathan Hartono (born 1991), a Singaporean singer and actor
- Robert Budi Hartono (born 1940), an Indonesian businessman
- Rudy Hartono (born 1949), an Indonesian badminton player
- Sunaryati Hartono, Indonesian attorney and government official
