= René Martínez =

Paraguayan footballer (born 1978)

Personal information
- Full name: Christian René Martínez Arevalos
- Date of birth: 16 May 1978 (age 48)
- Place of birth: Ciudad del Este, Paraguay
- Height: 1.82 m (5 ft 11 1/2 in)
- Position: Defender

Senior career*
Years	Team	Apps	(Gls)
2000–2006	3 de Febrero	78	(1)
2004–2005	→Sportivo Luqueño (loan)	18	(0)
2006–2008	Deltras	36	(2)
2008–2010	Persib Bandung	54	(2)
2010–2011	PSIR Rembang	26	(1)
2011–2013	PPSM KN	38	(2)
2013–2014	Madiun Putra	23	(1)
2014	PPSM Sakti Magelang	12	(2)
- * Club domestic league appearances and goals as of 30 May 2010

Christian René Martínez Arevalos (born May 16, 1978) is a Paraguayan former footballer. He previously played for PPSM Magelang at the 2014 Liga Indonesia Premier Division.
