= Muhammad Zamnur =

Indonesian footballer

Muhammad Zamnur is an Indonesian footballer who plays as a forward. He currently plays for Persinga Ngawi.
