= Bruno Casimir =

Cameroonian footballer

Personal information
- Full name: Kouotou Kounjouenko Casimir Bruno
- Date of birth: 17 December 1981 (age 44)
- Place of birth: Douala, Cameroon
- Height: 1.86 m (6 ft 1 in)
- Position: Centre-back

Team information
- Current team: Matrix Putra Brother's
- Number: 5

Senior career*
Years	Team	Apps	(Gls)
2000	Unisport Bafang		
2001–2003	Sable		
2003–2004	Beerschot		
2004–2007	Canon Yaoundé		
2007–2008	Arema Indonesia	33	(2)
2008–2009	Persita Tangerang	28	(0)
2009–2010	Persidafon Dafonsoro	23	(3)
2010–2011	Persiba Bantul	16	(0)
2011–2012	PSS Sleman	9	(0)
2013	Arema Cronus	16	(0)
2014	Persibangga Purbalingga	14	(3)
2017	Persita Tangerang	0	(0)
2019	Sriwijaya	8	(0)
2019	PSMS Medan	10	(1)
2020	Persis Solo	0	(0)
2021	PS Siak	18	(2)
2025–	Matrix Putra Brother's	4	(0)
Total		179	(11)
- * Club domestic league appearances and goals as of 13 February 2025

Kouotou Kounjouenko Casimir Bruno (born 17 December 1981) is a Cameroonian footballer who plays as a centre-back for Liga 4 club Matrix Putra Brother's.

== Club career ==
=== Sriwijaya ===
He was signed for Sriwijaya to play in Liga 2 in the 2019 season. Casimir made 8 league appearances and without scoring a goal for Sriwijaya.

=== PSMS Medan ===
In mid-season 2019, Bruno Casimir signed a one-year contract with PSMS Medan from Sriwijaya. He made 10 league appearances and scored 1 goal for PSMS.

=== Persis Solo ===
He was signed for Persis Solo to play in Liga 2 in the 2020 season. This season was suspended on 27 March 2020 due to the COVID-19 pandemic. The season was abandoned and declared void on 20 January 2021.

=== PS Siak ===
In 2021, Casimir signed a contract with the Indonesian Liga 3 club PS Siak. On 21 December 2021, PS Siak successfully won the 2021 Liga 3 Riau Final, after defeating Tornado on penalties (4–3) after previously playing 1–1. He made 18 league appearances and scored 2 goals for PS Siak.

== Personal life ==
Born and raised in Cameroon, he acquired Indonesian citizenship in 2019.

== Career statistics ==
As of 13 February 2025

Appearances and goals by club, season and competition
Club	Season	League			Cup		Continental		Other		Total	
Club	Season	Division	Apps	Goals	Apps	Goals	Apps	Goals	Apps	Goals	Apps	Goals
Sriwijaya	2019	Liga 2	8	0	0	0	–		0	0	8	0
PSMS Medan	2019	Liga 2	10	1	0	0	–		0	0	10	1
Persis Solo	2020	Liga 2	0	0	0	0	–		0	0	0	0
PS Siak	2021	Liga 3	18	2	0	0	–		0	0	18	2
Matrix Putra Brothers	2024–25	Liga 4	4	0	0	0	–		0	0	4	0
Career total			40	3	0	0	0	0	0	0	40	3

== Honours ==
=== Club ===
Persiba Bantul

- Indonesian Premier Division: 2010-11

PS Siak

- Liga 3 Riau: 2021
