= Javier Roca =

Chilean footballer (born 1977)

Personal information
- Full name: Javier Leopoldo Roca Sepúlveda
- Date of birth: 9 August 1977 (age 49)
- Place of birth: Santiago, Chile
- Height: 1.75 m (5 ft 9 in)
- Position: Midfielder

Team information
- Current team: Gungahlin United (manager)

Youth career
- Colo-Colo

Senior career*
Years	Team	Apps	(Gls)
1996–1998	Colo-Colo	0	(0)
1997	→ Deportes Los Andes (loan)		
1998	→ Unión San Felipe (loan)		
1999–2000	Deportivo Italchacao		
2000	Coquimbo Unido	11	(0)
2001	Deportes Arica	17	(11)
2004	PSMS Medan	18	(12)
2005	Persegi Gianyar	16	(8)
2006	Persitara North Jakarta	15	(7)
2007	Persija Jakarta	14	(8)
2008	Persiba Balikpapan	15	(6)
2008	Persebaya Surabaya	20	(15)
2009	Gresik United	16	(8)
2010–2011	Persidafon Dafonsoro	22	(12)
2011–2012	Batavia Union	10	(2)
2012–2013	Persis Solo		
Total		153	(87)

Managerial career
- 2021–2022: Persik Kediri
- 2022–2023: Arema
- 2023–: Gungahlin United (youth)
- 2023–: Gungahlin United
- * Club domestic league appearances and goals

Javier Leopoldo Roca Sepúlveda (born 9 August 1977) is a Chilean professional football coach and former player. He is currently in charge of Australian club Gungahlin United.

== Club career ==
As a football player, Roca is a product of Colo-Colo youth system and had an extensive career in Indonesia. Previously, he played for Venezuelan club Deportivo Italchacao from 1999 to 2000 and for Deportes Los Andes, Unión San Felipe Coquimbo Unido and Deportes Arica in his country of birth.

== Coaching career ==
Following his retirement as a football player, Roca continued as a manager in Indonesia. In 2023, he moved to Australia to be in charge of both the youth system and the first team of Gungahlin United.

== Managerial statistics ==
As of 14 September 2024

Managerial record by team and tenure
Team	From	To	Record				
Team	From	To	G	W	D	L	Win %
Persik Kediri	11 November 2021	13 August 2022	27	7	9	11	25.93
Arema	6 September 2022	6 February 2023	12	5	0	7	41.67
Gungahlin United	23 August 2024	Present	4	2	1	1	50.00
Total			43	14	10	19	32.56

== Honours ==
=== Player ===
Individual

- Copa Indonesia Top Goalscorer: 2005

=== Manager ===
Gungahlin United

- NPL1: 2024
