= PS Lampung Sakti =

Association football team in Indonesia

- Full name: Persatuan Sepakbola Lampung Sakti
- Nickname: The Lampung Elephant
- Founded: 2017; 9 years ago
- Dissolved: 2019; 7 years ago
- Ground: Sumpah Pemuda Stadium
- Capacity: 25,000
- Owner: PT Great Giant Pineapple Company (GGPC)
- 2018: Liga 3, Round of 16 (National)
Home colours	Away colours

Persatuan Sepakbola Lampung Sakti (simply known as PS Lampung Sakti) was an Indonesian football club based in Bandar Lampung, Lampung. This club owned by PT Great Giant Pineapple Company (GGPC) Humas Jaya.

== History ==
Previously, PS Lampung Sakti was named Persires Sukoharjo. Persires changed their name 7 times. In 1962, Persires was based in Rengat and used Persires Rengat as their club name. In the middle of 2011, the club merged with Bali Devata and was re-named Persires Bali Devata. Then they changed their name to Persires Banjarnegara after their move to Banjarnegara. In 2013, they moved again to Cirebon and changed the name again to Persires Cirebon. In 2014, they moved to Mashud Wisnusaputra Stadium, Kuningan and was re-named Persires Kuningan. In 2015, they moved to Sukoharjo and changed their name again.

=== Name change ===
- Persires Rengat (1962; lists of the major shareholder of the Indragiri Hulu Regency Government)
- Persires Bali Devata (2011–2012; merging with Bali Devata)
- Persires Banjarnegara (2013; home base at Banjarnegara)
- Persires Cirebon (2013; homebase at Watubelah Stadium, Cirebon)
- Persires Kuningan (2014; homebase at Mashud Wisnusaputra Stadium, Kuningan)
- Persires Sukoharjo (2015–2017; homebase at Gelora Merdeka Jombor Stadium, Sukoharjo)
- PS Lampung Sakti (2017–2019)

== Stadium ==
In 2017 Liga 2 the club used Sumpah Pemuda Stadium for their home matches.

== Season-by-season records ==
As Persires Rengat

Season	League	Tier	Tms.	Pos.	Piala Indonesia
2006	Second Division	3	47	3rd, Group IIB	–
2007	Second Division	3	53	1	Qualifying round
2008–09	First Division	3	48	4	Second round
2009–10	Premier Division	2	33	11th, Group 1	–
2010–11	Premier Division	2	39	13th, Group 1	–

As Persires Bali Devata

Season	League	Tier	Tms.	Pos.	Piala Indonesia
2011–12	Premier Division (LPIS)	2	28	5th, Group 3	First round

As Persires Banjarnegara

Season	League	Tier	Tms.	Pos.	Piala Indonesia
2013	Premier Division (LPIS)	2	21	8th, Group 2	–

As Persires Kuningan

Season	League	Tier	Tms.	Pos.	Piala Indonesia
2014	Premier Division	2	63	6th, Group 3	–

As Persires Sukoharjo

Season	League	Tier	Tms.	Pos.	Piala Indonesia
2015	Premier Division	2	55	did not finish	–
2016	ISC B	2	53	Withdrew	–

As PS Lampung Sakti

Season	League	Tier	Tms.	Pos.	Piala Indonesia
2017	Liga 2	2	61	7th, Group 2	–
2018	Liga 3	3	32	Second round	Second round
2019	Liga 3	3	32	Withdrew	Second round
