= Christian Lenglolo =

Cameroonian footballer (1982–2021)

Personal information
- Full name: Georges Christian Lenglolo
- Date of birth: 28 July 1982
- Place of birth: Douala, Cameroon
- Date of death: 4 September 2021 (aged 39)
- Place of death: Bogor, Indonesia
- Height: 1.83 m (6 ft 0 in)
- Position: Forward

Senior career*
| Years | Team | Apps | (Gls) |
| 2000 | Jasper United | 16 | (0) |
| 2003–2004 | Union Douala | 21 | (13) |
| 2005 | Persipura Jayapura | 25 | (9) |
| 2006 | Persikota Tangerang | 32 | (19) |
| 2007–2008 | Sriwijaya | 28 | (7) |
| 2008–2009 | Persema Malang | 30 | (10) |
| 2009–2010 | PSBI Blitar | 27 | (8) |
| 2011–2014 | PSIR Rembang | 49 | (16) |
| 2014–2015 | Persijap Jepara | 7 | (0) |

International career
| 2001–2002 | Cameroon U20 | | |
- * Club domestic league appearances and goals

Georges Christian Lenglolo (28 July 1982 – 4 September 2021) was a Cameroonian former professional footballer who played as a forward.

== Honours ==
Persipura Jayapura

- Liga Indonesia Premier Division: 2005

Sriwijaya

- Liga Indonesia Premier Division: 2007–08
