= Juan Luis Lillo =

Chilean footballer

Personal information
- Full name: Juan Luis Lillo Jara
- Date of birth: 11 July 1983 (age 43)
- Place of birth: Santiago, Chile
- Height: 1.81 m (5 ft 11 in)
- Position: Midfielder

Senior career*
Years	Team	Apps	(Gls)
2002–2003	Cobreloa		
2004–2005	Persigo Gorontalo		
2005–2007	PSPS Pekanbaru		
2008	Persema Malang		
2010–2011	Chainat		
2014	Persipon Pontianak		
- * Club domestic league appearances and goals

Juan Luis Lillo Jara (born 11 July 1983) is a Chilean former professional footballer who played as a midfielder for clubs in Chile, Thailand and Indonesia.

== Career ==
Born in Santiago, Lillo played in his homeland for Cobreloa in the top division.

Abroad, he played in Indonesia for Persigo Gorontalo, PSPS Pekanbaru, Persema Malang and Persipon Pontianak.

He also had a stint in Thailand with Chainat.

== Personal life ==
Lillo was married to the Indonesian TV presenter and model Emma Waroka, with whom he had legal issues due to alleged domestic violence.
