= Indonesian Premier Division =

- Founded: 2011
- Folded: 2013
- Country: Indonesia
- Confederation: AFC
- Number of clubs: 22 (2013); 28 (2011–12)
- Level on pyramid: 2
- Promotion to: Indonesian Premier League
- Relegation to: First Division
- Domestic cup: Piala Indonesia
- Last champions: PSS Sleman (2013)
- Most championships: Persepar Palangkaraya; PSS Sleman
- Website: divisiutama.co.id

Liga Prima Indonesia Sportindo Premier Division (Indonesian: Divisi Utama Liga Prima Indonesia Sportindo) was the regionalized second level of football competition system in Indonesia, organized by the PT Liga Prima Indonesia Sportindo and Football Association of Indonesia (PSSI). The competition is usually divided geographically into two or three groups.

Prior to the formation of Indonesia Super League in 2008, the Premier Division was the Indonesian top-flight football league. Along with Premier League/Super League, Premier Division was a competition for professional (semi professional) football clubs.

== Championship history ==
Season	League name	Champion	Score	Runner-up
2011-12	Divisi Utama	Persepar Palangkaraya	roundrobin	Pro Duta
2013	Divisi Utama	PSS Sleman	2-1	PSBL Bandar Lampung

== Grouping ==
Season	Nationwide	West	Central	East	Total
2011-12		9	10	9	28
2013		11		11	22

== Best players ==
Season	Player	Club
2011-12	(Nigeria) George Oyebode Oyedepo	Persepar Palangkaraya

== Top goalscorers ==
Season	Top scorer	Club	Goals
2011–12	(Liberia) Abel Cielo Quioh	Perseman Manokwari	11
