= Brima Pepito =

Sierra Leonean footballer

Personal information
- Full name: Brima Pepito Sanusie
- Date of birth: 13 April 1985 (age 41)
- Place of birth: Freetown, Sierra Leone
- Height: 1.86 m (6 ft 1 in)
- Position: Striker

Senior career*
Years	Team	Apps	(Gls)
2008–2009	Persiba Balikpapan	17	(5)
2009–2011	Persema Malang	55	(20)
2011–2012	Persitara North Jakarta	22	(11)
2012–2014	Persikabo Bogor	27	(8)
2014–2015	Martapura FC	25	(16)
Total		146	(60)
- * Club domestic league appearances and goals

Brima Pepito Sanusie (born 13 April 1985) is a Sierra Leonean former footballer who plays as a striker.

== Honours ==
Persema Malang

- Liga Indonesia Premier Division runner up: 2008–09
