= PSBI Blitar =

Indonesian football club

- Full name: Persatuan Sepakbola Bangsa Indonesia Blitar
- Nickname(s): Singo Lodro (Lodro Lion)
- Short name: PSBI
- Founded: 1928; 97 years ago
- Ground: Gelora Penataran Stadium; Blitar, East Java
- Capacity: 5.000
- Owner: Askab PSSI Blitar; Blitar Football Foundation
- Chairman: Wima Brahmantya
- Manager: Randu Ramaditya
- Coach: Yongki Kastanya
- League: Liga 4
- 2023: Round of 28, (East Java zone)
Home colours	Away colours

Persatuan Sepakbola Bangsa Indonesia Blitar, commonly known as PSBI Blitar is an Indonesian football club based in Blitar Regency, East Java. They currently compete in the Liga 4.

== Season-by-season records ==
Season	League	Tier	Tms.	Pos.	Piala Indonesia
2004	East Java Second Division	4	25	2	–
2005	Third Division	4		Eliminated in Provincial round	–
2006	Third Division	4		Fourth round	–
2007	Second Division	3	53	3	–
2008–09	First Division	3	48	3rd, Second round	–
2009–10	Premier Division	2	33	9th, Group 3	–
2010–11	Premier Division	2	39	3rd, Group 3	First group stage
2011–12	Premier Division (LPIS)	2	28	3rd, Group 3	–
2013	Premier Division (LPIS)	2	21	7th, Group 2	–
2014	Premier Division	2	63	3rd, Group 5	–
2015	Premier Division	2	55	did not finish	–
2016	ISC B	2	53	4th, Group 5	–
2017	Liga 2	2	61	8th, Group 5	–
2018	Liga 3	3	32	Eliminated in National zone route	First round
2019					
2020
2021–22	Liga 3	3	64	Eliminated in Provincial round	–
2022–23	Liga 3	3	season abandoned		–
2023–24	Liga 3	3	80	Eliminated in Provincial round	–
