= Kuonoto Stadium =

Stadium in Buol, Central Sulawesi, Indonesia

- Location in Sulawesi
- Location: Buol, Buol Regency, Central Sulawesi, Indonesia
- Coordinates: 1.162462°N 121.429283°E
- Owner: Regency government of Buol
- Operator: Regency government of Buol
- Capacity: 5,000
- Surface: Grass field

Tenant
- Persbul Buol

Kuonoto Stadium, also known as Mini Kuonoto, is a stadium in Buol, Buol Regency, Central Sulawesi, Indonesia. It has a seating capacity of 5,000 and is home to Persbul Buol football club.

== See also ==
- List of stadiums in Indonesia
- List of stadiums by capacity
