= Kalteng Putra F.C. =

Association football team in Indonesia

Kalteng Putra
- Full name: Kalimantan Tengah Putra Football Club
- Nicknames: Enggang Borneo (Borneo Hornbill); Laskar Isen Mulang (Isen Mulang Warrior)
- Short name: KTG; KLTG
- Founded: 1 January 1970; 56 years ago; as Persepar Palangkaraya; 2001; 25 years ago as Persepar Kalteng Putra; 2013; 13 years ago as Kalteng Putra Football Club
- Ground: Tuah Pahoe Stadium
- Capacity: 10.000
- Owner: PT Kalteng Putra
- Chairman: Agustiar Sabran
- Manager: Bintang Wigustiar
- Coach: Vacant
- League: Liga 4
Home colours	Away colours	Third colours

Kalimantan Tengah Putra Football Club, commonly known as Kalteng Putra, is an Indonesian football club based in Palangka Raya, Central Kalimantan. They competed in the Liga 3, but resigned and got relegated to the Liga 4. Their best achievement was in 2011–12 Indonesian Premier Division, becoming champions after occupying the first place in the grand final standings.

== History ==
The club was founded as Persepar Palangkaraya on 1 January 1970 in the form of "Perserikatan era". At that time, competition consisted of 48 clubs. J. J. Koetin is a football figure and the first chairman of Kalteng Putra. The next Kalteng Putra's chairman is Nahson Taway in 1993–1998. The next period, 1998–2001, is chaired by Hendry Yunus.

In 2001–2005 the chairman of Kalteng Putra was Andi Hamzah. In 2001, Kalteng Putra became an official club after being recognized by the PSSI as their member. After the era of Hamzah, the next Kalteng Putra's chairman has been Tuah Pahoe. In 2005, the club was coached by Salahudin. In 2007, the club was coached by Hartono Ruslan. In 2009, Kalteng Putra was coached by Inyong Lolombulan, who got replaced by Nandar Iskandar. In the 2010 season, Kalteng Putra was coached by Eko Tamamie, and Wahyudi F Dirun. The next chairman was Tuty Dau. In the 2011–2012 season, Kalteng Putra became champion in the Divisi Utama, coached by Agus Sutyono. In the 2013 season, Kalteng Putra participated in the Indonesia Premier League. Kalteng Putra briefly disbanded after withdrawing from Liga Nusantara in the 2024–25 season.

=== Name changes ===
- Persepar Palangkaraya (1970–2001) (Perserikatan era)
- Persepar Kalteng Putra (2001–2013)
- Kalteng Putra (2013–present)

== Stadium ==
Kalteng Putra FC's home stadium is Tuah Pahoe Stadium in Palangkaraya.

== Kit suppliers ==
- (Italy) Lotto (2010–2011)
- (Germany) Adidas (2011–2012)
- (England) Mitre (2012–2015)
- (Indonesia) MBB (2017–2019)
- (Indonesia) Adhoc (2020)
- (Indonesia) WWJD Sport (2021–2022)
- (Indonesia) Ereight Apparel (2023)

== Players (2024) ==
Note: Flags indicate national team as defined under FIFA eligibility rules; some limited exceptions apply. Players may hold more than one non-FIFA nationality.

No.	Pos.	Nation	Player
1	GK	IDN	Zhean Patih Alam
11	MF	IDN	Yogi Rahadian
12	GK	IDN	Shahar Ginanjar
14	MF	IDN	Michael Rumere
15	GK	IDN	Endang Subrata
16	DF	IDN	Saepuloh Maulana

No.	Pos.	Nation	Player
18	FW	IDN	Mario Aibekob
24	MF	IDN	Dadang Apridianto
25	MF	IDN	Dimas Andrianto
44	DF	IDN	Iqbal Baihaqi
45	FW	IDN	Usman Diarra
96	MF	IDN	Agi Pratama

== Coaching staff (2024) ==
Position	Name
Head coach	Vacant
Assistant coach	(Indonesia) Eko Tamamie
Assistant coach	(Indonesia) Yulian Syahreva
Assistant coach	(Indonesia) Edi Sibung
Fitness coach	(Indonesia) Rici Fauzi
Goalkeeper coach	(Indonesia) Sandy Firmansyah

== Supporters ==
Kalteng Putra have two biggest supporters' groups, the Pasus 1970 and the Kalteng Mania. Usually Pasus 1970 uses black attribute and Kalteng Mania red (bahandang).

== Season-by-season record ==
Season	League/Division	Tms.	Pos.	Piala Indonesia	AFC competition(s)
2004	Second Division	41	eliminated in provincial phase	—	—
2005	Second Division			—	—
2006	Second Division	48	3rd	—	—
2007	First Division	40	8th, Group 3	Qualifying round	—
2008–09	First Division	48	3rd, Group 4	—	—
2009–10	First Division	60	4th, Third round	—	—
2010	First Division	57	3rd, Second round	—	—
2011–12	Premier Division (LPIS)	28	1st	First round	—
2013	Indonesian Premier League	16	3rd	—	—
2014	Premier Division	63	3rd, Group 6	—	—
2015	Premier Division	55	season abandoned	—	—
2016	Indonesia Soccer Championship B	53	4th, Second round	—	—
2017	Liga 2	61	3rd, Third round	—	—
2018	Liga 2	24	3rd	Round of 32	—
2019	Liga 1	18	18th	Round of 32	—
2020	Liga 2	24	did not finish	—	—
2021–22	Liga 2	24	4th, Group D	—	—
2022–23	Liga 2	28	did not finish	—	—
2023–24	Liga 2	28	4th, Relegation round	—	—
2024–25	Liga Nusantara	16	Withdrew	—	—

== Honours ==
=== National ===
- Indonesian Premier Division/Liga 2
  - Champion (1): 2011–2012
  - Third place (1): 2018
