= Persemalra Southeast Maluku =

Indonesian association football club

Persemalra
- Full name: Persatuan Sepakbola Maluku Tenggara
- Nicknames: Tombak Merah (Red Spear); The Moluccas Eagle
- Founded: 1 January 1970; 56 years ago
- Ground: Maren Stadium; Southeast Maluku, Maluku
- Capacity: 6,500
- Owner: Government of Southeast Maluku Regency
- Chairman: A.H. Notanubun
- Manager: Andreas Rentanubun
- League: Liga 4
Home colours	Away colours

Persatuan Sepakbola Maluku Tenggara, simply known as a Persemalra, is an Indonesian football club based in Langgur, Southeast Maluku Regency, Maluku. They currently compete in the Liga 4 and play their home matches at the Maren Stadium with a capacity of 6,500 seats.

== History ==
Persemalra was founded on 14 June 1982, where previously this club was known as Persemalra Tual. When Tual separated from Southeast Maluku, this club moved to Langgur. The owner of Persemalra Southeast Maluku is the Government of Southeast Maluku Regency.

The club scored well in the 2010s. Persemalra beat the Divisi Utama in those seasons.

== Logo and name changes ==
Persemalra Tual

Persemalra Langgur

== Players ==
=== Current squad ===
Not known

=== Notable former players ===
- (Indonesia) Rahel Tuasalamony
- (Indonesia) Hendra Bayauw
- (Netherlands) Amarildo Lawansuka

== Honours ==
- Division III Maluku Zone
  - Champion: 2005
- Division III
  - Champion: 2005
- Division II
  - Champion: 2006
- Division I
  - Champion: 2007, 2009–10
- Premier Division
  - 9th place: 2010–11
