= Persipasi Bekasi =

Indonesian football club

Persipasi
- Full name: Persatuan Sepakbola Indonesia Patriot Bekasi
- Nickname(s): Laskar Patriot
- Founded: 1998; 27 years ago as Persipasi Bekasi; 2014; 11 years ago as Persipasi Bandung Raya
- Dissolved: 2021; 4 years ago Merged with Patriot Candrabhaga FC
- Ground: Patriot Stadium; Bekasi, West Java
- Capacity: 30,000
- Owner: Bekasi City Government
- Chairman: Rahmat Effendi
- Manager: Aan Suhanda
- League: Liga 3

Persatuan Sepakbola Indonesia Patriot Bekasi (simply known as Persipasi) was an Indonesian football club based in Bekasi, West Java. The club played in Liga 3. The team plays at Patriot Stadium in downtown Bekasi.

== History ==
Started with the name Persipasi Bekasi which was established in 1998, in the 2009–10 Liga Indonesia Premier Division, they were ranked 2nd in the First Division's Group I standings, with a value of 37 results from 20 games, 11 wins, 4 draws, and 5 defeats. The results are quite satisfactory several Supporter's group are starting to actively support them every home game such as Patriot Mania and Soebex Mania. Both groups of supporters share the motto "Love peace and friendship in every Persipasi match".

The conflict within the Persipasi Bekasi team occurred in 2014 when the Persipasi Bekasi of coaches and players stated that they did not trust the club manager, PG Patriot Indonesia. In April 2015, Persipasi Bekasi merged with Pelita Bandung Raya and changed its name to Persipasi Bandung Raya. The peak of the disappointment of Persipasi supporters became even more when the club they supported was sold and is currently named Madura United in 2016.

This made the Persipasi supporters disappointed with the Persipasi team management who actually sold their proud club. After the team has now changed to Madura United, Persipasi have to start the competition from Liga 3, even though they have the Patriot Candrabhaga Stadium which is of international standard.

In 2017, The Mayor of Bekasi formed a new football club called Patriot Chandrabhaga FC. The club was formed with the aim of football lovers in Bekasi, hoping that they can become the pride of the citizens. Since they were first formed, they played in Liga 3, their presence did not get the attention of the people. A number of football lovers, especially Persipasi's supporters, can't just look away, they still hope that Persipasi, the original icon of Bekasi, can comeback.

In 2021, Persipasi merged with the Patriot Chandrabhaga team and competed again in Liga 3 Zone West Java under the name PCB Persipasi. PCB Persipasi is an official member of Asprov PSSI West Java and plays in Liga 3 West Java zone.
