= 2010 Liga Indonesia Premier Division final =

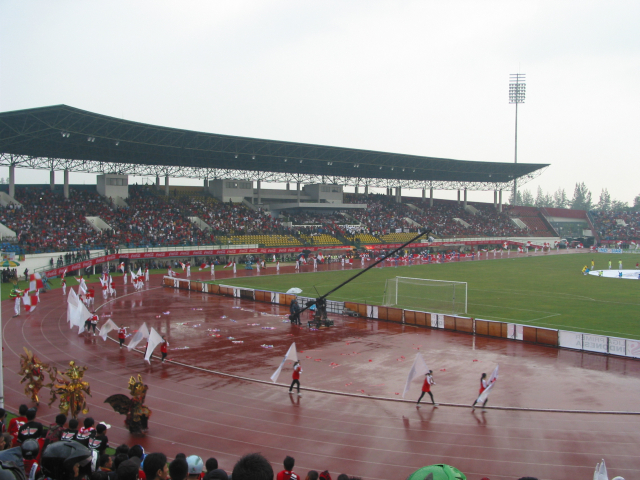
- Event: 2009–10 Liga Indonesia Premier Division
| Persibo Bojonegoro | Deltras Sidoarjo |
| (Indonesia) | (Indonesia) |
| 3 | 1 |
- Date: 16 May 2010
- Venue: Manahan Stadium, Solo, Central Java
- Liga Joss Man of the Match: Victor Da Silva (Persibo)
- Referee: Mulyadi (Indonesia)
- Attendance: 34,568
- Weather: Rainy

The 2010 Liga Indonesia Premier Division final was a football match which was played on Saturday, 29 May 2010. Persibo and Deltras was a debutant of the final stage.

== Road to Solo ==
| Persibo Bojonegoro | | | Round | Deltras Sidoarjo | | |
|---|---|---|---|---|---|---|
| Main article: 2009–10 Liga Indonesia Premier Division first group stage: Group 2: Team / Pld / W / D / L / GF / GA / GD / Pts; Persiram Raja Ampat / 20 / 14 / 2 / 4 / 35 / 15 / +20 / 44; Persibo Bojonegoro / 20 / 12 / 1 / 7 / 31 / 17 / +14 / 37; PS Mojokerto Putra / 20 / 11 / 0 / 9 / 25 / 20 / +5 / 33; Persipro Probolinggo / 20 / 10 / 2 / 8 / 17 / 22 / -5 / 32; Persigo Gorontalo / 20 / 10 / 1 / 9 / 29 / 20 / +9 / 31; Perseman Manokwari / 20 / 8 / 4 / 8 / 23 / 17 / +6 / 28; PSIM Yogyakarta / 20 / 6 / 5 / 9 / 22 / 31 / -9 / 23; PSIR Rembang / 20 / 6 / 5 / 9 / 17 / 27 / -10 / 23; PSBI Blitar / 20 / 7 / 2 / 11 / 21 / 32 / -11 / 23; PSS Sleman / 20 / 6 / 4 / 10 / 21 / 31 / -10 / 22; Persiku Kudus / 20 / 5 / 4 / 11 / 11 / 18 / -7 / 19 | | | First Group stage | Main article: 2009–10 Liga Indonesia Premier Division first group stage: Group 3: Team / Pld / W / D / L / GF / GA / GD / Pts; Persidafon / 20 / 13 / 3 / 4 / 51 / 12 / +39 / 42; Persiba Bantul / 20 / 11 / 4 / 5 / 33 / 16 / +17 / 37; Deltras Sidoarjo / 20 / 11 / 4 / 5 / 21 / 16 / +5 / 37; Persikab Bandung Regency / 20 / 10 / 2 / 8 / 24 / 22 / +2 / 32; Gresik United / 20 / 7 / 5 / 8 / 30 / 23 / +7 / 26; PSIS Semarang / 20 / 7 / 5 / 8 / 22 / 32 / -10 / 26; Pro Duta / 20 / 8 / 2 / 10 / 21 / 31 / -10 / 26; Mitra Kukar / 20 / 7 / 4 / 9 / 31 / 24 / +7 / 25; PPSM Sakti Magelang / 20 / 7 / 4 / 9 / 22 / 28 / -8 / 25; Persikota Tangerang / 20 / 4 / 7 / 9 / 19 / 37 / -18 / 19; Persis Solo / 20 / 2 / 6 / 12 / 9 / 42 / -33 / 12 | | |
| Main article: 2009–10 Liga Indonesia Premier Division second group stage: Group B: Team / Pld / W / D / L / GF / GA / GD / Pts; Deltras Sidoarjo / 3 / 2 / 1 / 0 / 5 / 3 / +2 / 7; Persibo Bojonegoro / 3 / 2 / 0 / 1 / 3 / 2 / +1 / 6; Persidafon Dafonsoro / 3 / 1 / 0 / 2 / 5 / 6 / -1 / 3; Persipasi Bekasi / 3 / 0 / 1 / 2 / 4 / 6 / -2 / 1 | | | Second Group stage | Main article: 2009–10 Liga Indonesia Premier Division second group stage: Group B: Team / Pld / W / D / L / GF / GA / GD / Pts; Deltras Sidoarjo / 3 / 2 / 1 / 0 / 5 / 3 / +2 / 7; Persibo Bojonegoro / 3 / 2 / 0 / 1 / 3 / 2 / +1 / 6; Persidafon Dafonsoro / 3 / 1 / 0 / 2 / 5 / 6 / -1 / 3; Persipasi Bekasi / 3 / 0 / 1 / 2 / 4 / 6 / -2 / 1 | | |
| Opponent | Result | Legs | Knockout stage | Opponent | Result | Legs |
| Persiram Raja Ampat | 1-0 | One-leg match played | Semifinals | Semen Padang | 4–2 | One-leg match played |

== Match details ==
29 May 2010
19:00 (WIB)

| Persibo Bojonegoro | 0 – 0 (a.e.t.) | Deltras Sidoarjo |
|---|---|---|
| | Report |
Penalties
| Victor Da Silva (penalty scored); Nurhidayat (penalty scored); Jajang Paliama (penalty scored) | 3 – 1 | Fachami Amirudin |

Manahan Stadium, Solo, Central Java
Attendance: 34,568
Referee: Mulyadi (Indonesia)

| Persibo Bojonegoro | Deltras Sidoarjo |

Persibo Bojonegoro: 4-4-2
| GK | 77 | (Indonesia) Hery Prasetyo |
| DF | 6 | (Indonesia) Muhammad Hamzah |
| DF | 8 | (Indonesia) Modestus Setiawan |
| DF | 15 | (Indonesia) Slamet Sampurno |
| DF | 88 | (Indonesia) Nurhidayat |
| MF | 4 | (Brazil) Victor Da Silva (c) |
| MF | 10 | (Liberia) Abiel Cielo |
| MF | 16 | (Indonesia) Jajang Paliama |
| MF | 17 | (Indonesia) Mochamad Irfan |
| FW | 9 | (Indonesia) Busari |
| FW | 22 | (Indonesia) Melky Pekey | (substituted off) 86' |
Substitutes
| DF | 2 | (Indonesia) Novan Setyo | (substituted on) 86' |
| DF | 7 | (Indonesia) Maidiyansyah |
| MF | 11 | (Indonesia) Kukuh Adriyono |
| DF | 13 | (Indonesia) Akhmad Aries Tuansyah |
| FW | 19 | (Indonesia) Khoirul Asnan |
| MF | 27 | (Indonesia) Much. Samsul Huda |
| GK | 32 | (Indonesia) Johan Charles |
Head coach
(Indonesia) Sartono Anwar

Deltras Sidoarjo: 3-6-1
| GK | 1 | (Indonesia) Dwi Kuswanto |
| DF | 6 | (Indonesia) Mujib Ridwan |
| DF | 18 | (Indonesia) Erfan Fabianto |
| DF | 24 | (Indonesia) Agung Yudha | (substituted off) 91' |
| MF | 3 | (Indonesia) Wahyu Gunawan |
| MF | 5 | (Indonesia) Khoirul Mashuda |
| MF | 7 | (Liberia) Sackie Doe | (substituted off) 111' |
| MF | 9 | (Indonesia) Feri Aman Saragih (c) |
| MF | 14 | (Indonesia) Fachmi Amiruddin |
| MF | 34 | (Indonesia) Imam Yulianto | (yellow card) 28' |
| FW | 19 | (Indonesia) Satyo Husodo |
Substitutes
| DF | 2 | (Indonesia) Muhammad Kusen | (substituted on) 91' |
| MF | 8 | (Indonesia) Arif Basuki | (substituted on) 111' |
| FW | 10 | (Liberia) Roberto Kwateh |
| GK | 16 | (Indonesia) M. Juni Irawan |
| FW | 17 | (Indonesia) Indra Setiawan |
| MF | 27 | (Indonesia) Sugiarto |
| DF | 29 | (Indonesia) Dodok Anang |
Head coach
(Indonesia) Nus Yadera

Man of the Match:
(Brazil) Victor Da Silva

Assistant referees:
???
???
Fourth official:
???

Match rules

- 90 minutes.
- 30 minutes of extra time if necessary.
- Penalty shoot-out if scores still level.
- Seven named substitutes, of which up to three may be used.

== See also ==
- 2009–10 Liga Indonesia Premier Division
