= 2010–11 Persibo Bojonegoro season =

Persibo Bojonegoro
2010–11 season
- Chairman: (Indonesia) Taufik Risnendar
- Manager: (Indonesia) Sartono Anwar
- Ground: Letjen Haji Sudirman Stadium
- LPi: 4th

The 2010–11 season is Persibo Bojonegoro's 1st season that the club play in the Indonesia Super League, the top division of Indonesian football, and subsequently defect to Liga Primer Indonesia, an independent professional competition for football clubs in Indonesia.

== Review and events ==
Bojonegoro is 2009–10 Premier Division champions, under supervision of the Football Association of Indonesia (PSSI). The club got promoted from Premier Division to Indonesian Super League.

Bojonegoro had played in Super League, but no wins in six games.

=== ISL Results summary ===
Overall								Home						Away					
Pld	W	D	L	GF	GA	GD	Pts	W	D	L	GF	GA	GD	W	D	L	GF	GA	GD
6	0	2	4	4	9	−5	2	0	2	2	2	4	−2	0	0	2	2	5	−3

Last updated: start of season.
Source: Liga Indonesia

=== ISL Results by round ===
Round	1	2	3	4	5	6	7	8	9	10	11	12	13	14	15	16	17	18	19	20	21	22	23	24	25	26	27	28	29	30	31	32	33	34
Ground	H	H	A	A	H	H	H	A	H	A	A	H	H	A	A	H	A	H	A	H	H	A	H	A	A	H	A	H	H	A	H	A	H	A
Result	D	L	L	L	D	L																												
Position	8	13	17	17	17	18																												

Updated to match(es) played on 30 April 2011. Source: Liga Indonesia
A = Away; H = Home; W = Win; D = Draw; L = Loss

=== IPL ===
In late 2010, Bojonegoro withdrew from 2010 to 2011 Indonesia Super League and move to 2011 Liga Primer Indonesia. Bojonegoro played their first game against Batavia Union on 9 January 2011, in a 0–2 loss at home.

Liga Primer Indonesia officials revealed Samsul Arif was a marquee signing, who sat outside the club's Liga Primer Indonesia salary cap.

== Squad ==
As of 30 April 2011, according to the IPL official website. Note: Flags indicate national team as defined under FIFA eligibility rules; some limited exceptions apply. Players may hold more than one non-FIFA nationality.

No.	Pos.	Nation	Player
1	GK	(Indonesia) IDN	Rendra Pratama
2	DF	(Indonesia) IDN	Novan Sasongko
3	DF	(Indonesia) IDN	Achmad Sumardi
4	MF	(Indonesia) IDN	Ahmad Sholeh
5	DF	(Brazil) BRA	Carlos Bizarro
6	DF	(Indonesia) IDN	Muhammad Hamzah
7	FW	(Syria) SYR	Muhammad Albicho
9	FW	(Indonesia) IDN	Samsul Arif
10	MF	(Brazil) BRA	Wallacer de Andrade
13	DF	(Indonesia) IDN	Akhmad Tuansyah (captain)
15	MF	(Indonesia) IDN	Iswandi
16	MF	(Indonesia) IDN	Jajang Paliyama

No.	Pos.	Nation	Player
17	MF	(Indonesia) IDN	Mohamad Irfan
18	FW	(Brazil) BRA	Tiago Nunez da Silva
19	FW	(Indonesia) IDN	Dicky Firasat
20	DF	(Japan) JPN	Tatsuya Kuroda
23	DF	(Indonesia) IDN	Aang Suparman
24	DF	(Indonesia) IDN	Friyan Yuono
27	MF	(Indonesia) IDN	Mochammad Huda
29	GK	(Indonesia) IDN	Susanto
50	GK	(Indonesia) IDN	Wahyudi
81	FW	(China) CHN	Li Zhixing
88	MF	(Indonesia) IDN	Nurhidayat
99	MF	(South Korea) KOR	Kim Kang-hyun

== Transfers ==
=== In ===
Date	Pos.	Name	From	Source
22 August 2010	FW	(Indonesia) Dicky Firasat	(Indonesia) Persela Lamongan	
19 August 2010	GK	(Indonesia) Syaifudin	(Indonesia) Persebaya	
	FW	(Syria) Muhammad Albico	(Syria) Al-Wahda Damascus	
