= 2008–09 Liga Indonesia Premier Division =

Football season in Indonesia

Liga Indonesia Premier Division
- Season: 2008–09
- Champions: Persisam Samarinda
- Promoted: Persisam Samarinda; Persema Malang; PSPS Pekanbaru; Persebaya Surabaya
- Relegated: Persibat Batang; PSP Padang; Persekabpas Pasuruan
- Top goalscorer: Jean Paul Boumsong; Herman Dzumafo; Mardiansyah (17 goals each)

The 2008–09 Liga Indonesia Premier Division (also known as Liga Esia for sponsorship reasons) was the 14th season of the Liga Indonesia Premier Division. It was the first season for the Liga Indonesia Premier Division as the second tier of the Indonesian football pyramid, following the creation of the Indonesia Super League as the first tier.

== Changes from 2007–08 season ==
The Football Association of Indonesia's decision to create a new Indonesia Super League relegated the Liga Indonesia Premier Division to the second tier of Indonesian football for the first time.

For the 2007 season, teams were allocated to one of two groups (with 15 and 14 teams respectively) in the first round. The top four in each group advanced to the second round, or quarter final. The eight teams in the second round were divided into two groups of four, the top two teams in each group advancing to the semifinal in a knock-out system. Champions, runners-up, and 3rd-place teams were promoted to the Indonesia Super League, while the 4th-place team faced the 15th-place team from the Indonesia Super League in a promotion/relegation play-off match. The 14th and 15th-place teams in the first round from each group were relegated to the First Division.

== Season overview ==
Twenty-nine teams took part. The season began on 4 August 2008 and the last games were played on 29 May 2009.

The top four from group 1 in the first round were Persisam Samarinda, PSPS Pekanbaru, Mitra Kukar, and Persikabo Bogor, and from group 2 Persema Malang, Persebaya Surabaya, Persiba Bantul, and Persigo Gorontalo. The group winners – Persisam Samarinda and Persema Malang – hosted the quarter-finals, both advancing to the semifinal, again as group winners. In the semifinal Persisam Samarinda beat PSPS Pekanbaru and Persema Malang beat Persebaya Surabaya. The championship was won by Persisam Samarinda with a 1–0 victory over Persema Malang.

Persisam Samarinda, Persema Malang, and PSPS Pekanbaru were automatically promoted to the Indonesia Super League. The promotion/relegation playoff was won by Persebaya Surabaya, who beat Indonesia Super League 15th-place team PSMS Medan in a penalty shoot-out to also win promotion. Persibat Batang, PSP Padang, and Persekabpas Pasuruan were relegated to the Liga Indonesia First Division.

On 12 November 2008, in their match away to Persibom Bolaang Mongondow at Ambang Stadium, Kotamobagu, PSIR Rembang players attacked and injured the referee. The incident began when referee Muzair awarded a penalty to Persibom. Angered by the decision, PSIR players punched and kicked the referee, knocking him to the ground and trampling on him; the bruised official had to be rushed to hospital. A similar fate almost befell his replacement, Jusman R.A. He was chased and stripped naked on the field of play after showing a red card to a PSIR player who committed a bad challenge. The match ended 1–0 for Persibom. PSIR were suspended for two years as a result, but on appeal on 1 December 2008 the suspension was lifted, and their next match was rescheduled. The day after the incident PSIR players Yongki Rantung, Tadis Suryanto and Stevie Kusoi were banned from football for life. Five days later Stanley Mamuaya also received a life ban, and fellow players Stanley Katuuk, Gery Mandagi, and M Orah were banned from football for two years. Muzair Usman, Jusman R.A and match inspector Sukarno Wahid subsequently received a reward from PSSI in recognition of their justice, bravery and loyalty, which was considered to have promoted the image of football in Indonesia.

On 7 March 2009, during a match between Persela Lamongan and PKT Bontang at Mulawarman Stadium, Jumadi Abdi was hospitalized after colliding with Persela's Deny Tarkas. Abdi suffered an injury to the stomach and had surgery on his intestines, but died eight days later.

== Teams ==
Promoted from First Division:

- PSP Padang
- PSAP Sigli
- Persih Tembilahan
- PSPS Riau
- Persikad Depok
- Persiku Kudus
- Persikab Bandung
- Persibat Batang
- Persibo Bojonegoro
- Persiba Bantul
- Gresik United
- PSIR Rembang
- Mitra Kukar F.C.
- Persigo Gorontalo
- Persisam Putra Samarinda

=== Stadiums and locations ===
Locations of the teams in the 2008-2009 Liga Indonesia Premier Division.
Blue: West Division; Red: East Division

== Groups ==
The competition was divided into two groups, based on geography. Group 1 or West Group was for clubs from Sumatera, Kalimantan and the Western part of Java, while Group 2 or East Group was for clubs from the Eastern part of Java and Eastern Indonesia.

Group 1	Group 2
Persisam Samarinda	Persema Malang
PSPS Pekanbaru	Persebaya Surabaya
Mitra Kukar	Persiba Bantul
Persikabo Bogor	Persigo Gorontalo
Persikab Bandung	Persibom Bolaang Mongondow
Persiraja Banda Aceh	Persibo Bojonegoro
Semen Padang	Perseman Manokwari
Persih Tembilahan	PSIR Rembang
PSDS Deli Serdang	Gresik United
Persikad Depok	PSS Sleman
PSAP Sigli	Persis Solo
PSSB Bireun	PSIM Yogyakarta
Persikota Tangerang	Persiku Kudus
Persibat Batang	Persekabpas Pasuruan
PSP Padang

== Foreign Players ==
A total of maximum 3 Foreign Players may be registered

=== Group 1 ===
Club	Player 1	Player 2	Player 3
Mitra Kukar	(Burkina Faso) Germain Bationo	(Cameroon) Marc Orland Etougou	-
Persibat	-	-	-
Persih	(Cameroon) Raymond Nsangue	(Cameroon) Sadissou Bako	-
Persikab	(Liberia) Amos Marah	(Mali) Mamadou Niane	-
Persikabo	(Paraguay) Mauro Gaston	-	-
Persikad	(Cameroon) Jean-Paul Boumsong	(Cameroon) Nnana Onana	(Japan) Yusuke Sasa
Persikota	(Argentina) Esteban Busto	(Uruguay) Esteban Guillén	-
Persiraja	(Argentina) Leonardo Felicia	(Cameroon) Tong Ely Mourel	-
Putra Samarinda	(Uruguay) Gustavo Ortiz	(Chile) Patricio Jiménez	(Paraguay) Aldo Barreto
PSAP	(Cameroon) Serge Elembe	(Liberia) Fallah Johnson	(Liberia) Sunday Seah
PSDS	(Cameroon) Anderson Pohos	(Cameroon) Mahop Guy	(Nigeria) Osas Saha
PSP	(Cameroon) Noah Romuald	-	-
PSPS	(Cameroon) Cyril Tchana	(Cameroon) Henry Njobi	(Cameroon) Herman Dzumafo
PSSB	(Brazil) Antônio Teles	-	-
Semen Padang	(Brazil) Wanderson da Silva	(Liberia) Edward Junior Wilson	(Liberia) Stephen Mennoh

=== Group 2 ===
Club	Player 1	Player 2	Player 3
Gresik	(Burkina Faso) Brahima Traoré	(Nigeria) Christopher Ikechukwu	-
Persebaya	(Brazil) Anderson da Silva	(Brazil) Jairon	(Chile) Javier Roca
Persekabpas	(Chile) Francisco Rotunno	(Nigeria) Udie Mathias	-
Persema	(Cameroon) Christian Lenglolo	(Cameroon) Seme Pattrick	(Sierra Leone) Brima Pepito
Perseman	(Guinea) Moussa Keita	(Nigeria) George Oyedepo	-
Persiba	(Argentina) Ezequiel González	(Brazil) Cristiano	(Nigeria) Michael Onwatuegwu
Persibo	(Cameroon) Bessala	(Liberia) Varney Boakay	-
Persibom	(Brazil) Antônio Cláudio	(Serbia) Aleksandar Paunovic	-
Persigo	(Chile) Claudio Martínez	(Liberia) Daouda Sylla	-
Persiku	(Cameroon) Crepin Owang Abong	-	-
Persis	-	-	-
PSIM	-	-	-
PSIR	(Brazil) Evandro	(Cameroon) Michael Babouaken	(Liberia) Roberto Kwateh
PSS	(Argentina) Angel Vera	(Nigeria) Peter Lipede	-

== First round ==
=== Group 1 ===
==== Standings ====
Pos	Team	Pld	W	D	L	GF	GA	GD	Pts	Qualification or relegation
1	Persisam Samarinda	28	17	7	4	52	24	+28	58	Advance to second round
2	PSPS Pekanbaru	28	17	5	6	47	25	+22	56	Advance to second round
3	Mitra Kukar	28	17	1	10	38	28	+10	52	Advance to second round
4	Persikabo Bogor	28	13	10	5	44	27	+17	49	Advance to second round
5	Persikab Bandung	28	14	6	8	46	34	+12	48	
6	Persiraja Banda Aceh	28	12	5	11	32	34	−2	41	
7	Semen Padang	28	10	10	8	42	30	+12	40	
8	Persih Tembilahan	28	10	7	11	39	35	+4	37	
9	PSDS Deli Serdang	28	10	4	14	27	34	−7	34	
10	Persikad Depok (Note: Persikad Depok were docked three points.)	28	10	6	12	33	42	−9	33	
11	PSAP Sigli	28	10	3	15	28	47	−19	33	
12	PSSB Bireun	28	7	6	15	23	34	−11	27	
13	Persikota Tangerang	28	7	6	15	29	52	−23	27	
14	Persibat Batang (R)	28	8	2	18	25	44	−19	26	Relegation to First Division
15	PSP Padang (R)	28	6	6	16	24	39	−15	24	Relegation to First Division

Source: RSSSF
(R) Relegated

==== Positions by round ====
Team ╲ Round	1	2	3	4	5	6	7	8	9	10	11	12	13	14	15	16	17	18	19	20	21	22	23	24	25	26	27	28
Persisam Putra Samarinda	14																									1		
PSPS Pekanbaru																										2		
Mitra Kukar																										3		
Persikabo Bogor																										4		
Persikab Bandung																										5		
Persiraja Banda Aceh																										6		
Semen Padang																										7		
Persih Tembilahan																										8		
PSDS Deli Serdang	9	4	9	6	4	4	2	3	7	7	10	8	9	11	11	8	10	12	9	9	9	11	9	10	11	11		
Persikad Depok	3	8	12	13	10	11	12	13	12	11	11	11	10	9	9	10	8	8	8	8	8	8	10	9	9	7		
PSAP Sigli	8	9	14	14	12	12	13	14	15	15	15	15	15	15	15	14	13	11	12	13	11	10	11	11	10	10		
PSSB Bireun	5	6	1	1	1	2	3	2	2	5	5	4	6	8	8	9	11	10	11	10	12	13	12	12	13	13		
Persikota Tangerang	7	3	7	12	6	7	9	8	8	10	9	10	11	13	13	13	14	14	13	14	14	14	14	14	12	12		
Persibat Batang	12	13	15	15	15	13	14	15	13	13	14	14	13	12	12	12	12	13	14	12	13	12	13	13	14	14		
PSP Padang	15	15	13	9	8	5	8	10	9	12	12	12	14	14	14	15	15	15	15	15	15	15	15	15	15	15		

Qualification to the Second Round
Relegation to the 2009–10 Liga Indonesia First Division

==== Result ====
Home \ Away	MKU	BAT	TEM	PSBD	BOG	PUR	PTA	PBA	PSA	PSAP	PDS	PPA	PEK	PSSB	SPA
Mitra Kukar		2–0	2–1	2–1	1–0	3–0	1–0	1–0	1–0	6–0	1–0	1–0	1–0	5–1	1–0
Persibat Batang	2–1		1–2	2–2	0–1	0–3	0–1	3–0	0–1	1–0	1–1	3–1	2–1	2–0	1–0
Persih Tembilahan	1–2	1–0		4–0	1–1	0–0	4–1	1–0	1–2	5–0	1–0	1–0	2–2	2–1	2–2
Persikab Bandung	3–1	4–2	3–1		2–2	2–0	4–0	3–1	0–1	2–0	1–0	3–0	2–1	3–2	1–1
Persikabo Bogor	3–0	2–0	1–0	1–1		1–1	3–0	2–0	2–2	3–1	2–0	2–1	2–0	1–0	0–0
Persikad Depok	3–1	5–2	1–0	2–0	2–1		0–0	2–1	0–1	4–0	3–0	1–3	0–2	2–1	1–1
Persikota Tangerang	2–3	3–0	5–2	1–3	1–3	1–0		0–0	0–1	0–1	2–0	0–3	2–2	1–1	3–2
Persiraja Banda Aceh	2–0	1–0	1–0	2–1	2–0	1–1	2–1		2–1	3–3	1–0	3–1	0–1	2–1	1–0
Persisam Samarinda	1–0	1–0	1–1	2–0	2–1	6–0	6–1	1–1		2–0	5–1	1–0	3–0	2–1	4–2
PSAP Sigli	0–0	1–0	2–1	1–2	1–2	2–0	4–0	2–1	1–1		1–0	3–0	1–2	1–0	1–0
PSDS Deli Serdang	2–0	2–1	2–0	3–2	3–2	1–1	2–0	0–1	1–0	1–0		1–0	0–1	5–0	1–1
PSP Padang	1–2	0–1	1–1	0–1	2–2	1–0	2–2	3–2	1–1	2–1	0–0		1–1	1–0	0–1
PSPS Pekanbaru	2–0	2–0	2–1	2–0	2–2	3–0	2–0	1–0	2–2	6–1	2–0	2–0		2–0	3–2
PSSB Bireuen	1–0	1–0	0–0	0–0	0–0	3–1	0–1	1–1	3–0	2–0	3–0	1–0	0–1		1–1
Semen Padang	2–0	5–1	2–3	0–0	2–2	5–0	1–1	3–0	2–2	1–0	2–1	2–0	1–0	1–0	

Source: RSSSF
Legend: Blue = home team win; Yellow = draw; Red = away team win.

=== Group 2 ===
==== Standings ====
Pos	Team	Pld	W	D	L	GF	GA	GD	Pts	Qualification or relegation
1	Persema Malang	26	19	1	6	52	26	+26	58	Advance to second round
2	Persebaya Surabaya	26	18	1	7	44	19	+25	55	Advance to second round
3	Persiba Bantul	26	15	4	7	32	21	+11	49	Advance to second round
4	Persigo Gorontalo	26	15	1	10	38	27	+11	46	Advance to second round
5	Persibom BM	26	14	1	11	33	26	+7	43	
6	Persibo Bojonegoro	26	12	5	9	35	31	+4	41	
7	Perseman Manokwari	26	12	3	11	31	28	+3	39	
8	PSIR Rembang	26	8	7	11	20	31	−11	31	
9	Gresik United	26	9	3	14	31	36	−5	30	
10	PSS Sleman (Note: PSS Sleman were docked three points.)	26	9	6	11	31	38	−7	30	
11	Persis Solo (Note: Persis Solo were docked one point.)	26	7	5	14	17	28	−11	25	
12	PSIM Yogyakarta	26	7	4	15	20	36	−16	25	
13	Persiku Kudus	26	7	4	15	19	40	−21	25	
14	Persekabpas Pasuruan (Note: Persekabpas Pasuruan were docked three points.) (R)	26	5	5	16	22	38	−16	17	Relegation to First Division

Source: RSSSF
(R) Relegated

==== Positions by round ====
Team ╲ Round	1	2	3	4	5	6	7	8	9	10	11	12	13	14	15	16	17	18	19	20	21	22	23	24	25	26
Persema Malang	1	6	3	2	6	7	6	4	2	3	3															1
Persebaya Surabaya	10	5	2	6	3	1	1	1	1	1	1															2
Persiba Bantul	6	1	1	1	1	4	3	2	3	2	2															3
Persigo Gorontalo	12	8	10	11	9	8	7	7	7	7	6															4
Persibom BM	3	7	4	3	5	3	2	3	5	5	4															5
Persibo Bojonegoro	2	2	6	8	10	11	12	12	11	11	11															6
Perseman Manokwari	11	12	8	7	4	2	5	6	4	4	5															7
PSIR Rembang	4	4	7	5	2	6	4	5	6	6	7															8
Gresik United	9	13	13	10	12	12	11	9	12	12																9
PSS Sleman	8	10	11	12	11	10	10	11	10	10																10
Persis Solo	13	14	14	14	14	14	14	14	14	14																11
PSIM Yogyakarta	14	9	9	9	8	9	9	10	9	9																12
Persiku Kudus	7	3	6	4	7	5	8	8	8	8																13
Persekabpas Pasuruan	5	11	12	13	13	13	13	13	13	13																14

Qualification to the Second Round
Relegation to the 2009–10 Liga Indonesia First Division

==== Result ====
Home \ Away	GU	PBY	PPA	PMA	PSMN	BAN	PBO	PBM	GOR	PSKU	SOL	YOG	REM	PSS
Gresik United			2–0			0–1		0–0	1–0			2–1	2–2	
Persebaya Surabaya	3–1		2–0	6–1			1–2		5–0					
Persekabpas Pasuruan									0–3					
Persema Malang									3–0	4–0				
Perseman Manokwari	2–1			4–1						2–0				
Persiba Bantul			0–0					3–1						
Persibo Bojonegoro						0–2						1–1		
Persibom BM									1–0					
Persigo Gorontalo														
Persiku Kudus	1–0													0–0
Persis Solo		1–2												
PSIM Yogyakarta				0–1										
PSIR Rembang	1–0	0–1									2–1			
PSS Sleman		1–1												

Source: RSSSF
Legend: Blue = home team win; Yellow = draw; Red = away team win.

== Second round ==
Key to colours in group tables
Top two placed teams advance to the semifinal

Legend
Group winners and second-placed directly qualify for the semi-finals

=== Group A ===
Pos	Team	Pld	W	D	L	GF	GA	GD	Pts	Qualification
1	Persema Malang	3	2	1	0	4	1	+3	7	Advance to knockout phase
2	PSPS Pekanbaru	3	1	2	0	5	3	+2	5	Advance to knockout phase
3	Persiba Bantul	3	1	0	2	3	5	−2	3	
4	Persikabo Bogor	3	0	1	2	2	5	−3	1	

Source: RSSSF

Note : All matches played in Malang.

18 May 2009
15:30 WIB

Persema Malang	1–0	Persiba Bantul
Pepito 2'

Gajayana Stadium, Malang, East Java
Attendance: 1111
18 May 2009
19:00 WIB

PSPS Pekanbaru	1–1	Persikabo
Tchana 64'		Gaston 67'

Gajayana Stadium, Malang, East Java
Attendance: 1012
20 May 2009
15:30 WIB

Persikabo	0-2	Persema Malang
		Jaya 3', 12'

Gajayana Stadium, Malang, East Java
Attendance: 923
20 May 2009
19:00 WIB

PSPS Pekanbaru	3–1	Persiba Bantul
Tchana 13', 60'; Ade 50'		Onwatuegwu 73'

Gajayana Stadium, Malang, East Java
Attendance: 923
23 May 2009
19:00 WIB

Persema Malang	1–1	PSPS Pekanbaru
Pepito 43'		Dzumafo 34'

Gajayana Stadium, Malang, East Java
Attendance: 1200
23 May 2009
19:00 WIB

Persiba Bantul	2–1	Persikabo
Ezequiel 3', 60'		Gaston 33'

Kanjuruhan Stadium, Malang, East Java
Attendance: 759

=== Group B ===
Pos	Team	Pld	W	D	L	GF	GA	GD	Pts	Qualification
1	Persisam Samarinda	3	2	1	0	10	2	+8	7	Advance to knockout phase
2	Persebaya Surabaya	3	1	1	1	2	2	0	4	Advance to knockout phase
3	Mitra Kukar	3	1	1	1	4	7	−3	4	
4	Persigo Gorontalo	3	0	1	2	4	9	−5	1	

Source: RSSSF

Note : All matches played in Samarinda.

18 May 2009
15:30 WITA

Persisam Putra Samarinda	5–1	Mitra Kukar
Ortiz 22', 52'; Barreto 32'; Jiménez 69'; Ilham 84'		Ferry 18'

Segiri Stadium, Samarinda, East Kalimantan
Attendance: 805
18 May 2009
19:00 WITA

Persebaya Surabaya	2–1	Persigo Gorontalo
Jairon 4', 16'		Iksan 23'

Segiri Stadium, Samarinda, East Kalimantan
Attendance: 11,230
20 May 2009
15:30 WITA

Persigo Gorontalo	1-5	Persisam Putra Samarinda
Sylla 64'		Kurniawan 33'; Ortiz 36', 44'; Barreto 75'; Ilham 88'

Segiri Stadium, Samarinda, East Kalimantan
Attendance: 1213
20 May 2009
19:00 WITA

Persebaya Surabaya	0–1	Mitra Kukar
		Bejo 89'

Segiri Stadium, Samarinda, East Kalimantan
Attendance: 7,112
23 May 2009
19:00 WITA

Persisam Putra Samarinda	0–0	Persebaya Surabaya

Segiri Stadium, Samarinda, East Kalimantan
Attendance: 17,357
23 May 2009
19:00 WITA

Mitra Kukar	2–2	Persigo Gorontalo
Gusti 29'; Ihrom 72'		Marwan 29'; Iksan 35'

Balikpapan Stadium, Samarinda, East Kalimantan
Attendance: 4,776

== Knockout phase ==
Semi-finals
26 May – Samarinda
Persisam Samarinda	3
PSPS Pekanbaru	1
26 May – Samarinda
Persema Malang	3
Persebaya Surabaya	1

Final
29 May – Samarinda
Persisam Samarinda	1
Persema Malang	0
Third place
29 May – Samarinda
PSPS Pekanbaru	5
Persebaya Surabaya	1

=== Semifinals ===
26 May 2009
15:30 WITA

Persisam Samarinda	3–1	PSPS Pekanbaru
Baretto 39', 52'; Kurniawan 65'		Dzumafo 69'

Segiri Stadium, Samarinda
Attendance: 10,000
Referee: Syamsudin Linta
26 May 2009
19:30 WITA

Persema Malang	3–1	Persebaya Surabaya
Sutaji 6'; Pepito 28'; Harmoko 72'		Faris 67'

Segiri Stadium, Samarinda
Attendance: 6,000
Referee: Hariyanto

=== Third place playoff ===
29 May 2009
15:30 WITA

PSPS Pekanbaru	5–1	Persebaya Surabaya
Ade 5'; Iman 8'; April 16'; Danil 25'; Dzumafo 90'	Report	Jairon 61'

Palaran Stadium, Samarinda
Attendance: 32,000
Referee: Jerry Elly

=== Final ===
29 May 2009
19:00 WITA

Persisam Samarinda	1–0	Persema Malang
Baretto 35'	Report

Palaran Stadium, Samarinda
Attendance: 30,000
Referee: Suharto

== Promotion/relegation playoff ==
The promotion/relegation play-off match was held in SIliwangi Stadium, Bandung, on 30 June 2009. Persebaya Surabaya, the 4th-place team in the Liga Indonesia Premier Division played PSMS Medan, the 15th-place team in the Indonesia Super League. The winner would play in the Indonesia Super League the following season, while the loser would play in the Liga Indonesia Premier Division.

30 June 2009
19:00 WIB

Persebaya Surabaya	1–1 (a.e.t.)	PSMS Medan
Jairon 88'	Report	Zada 32'
Penalties
Batoum (penalty missed); Andi (penalty scored); Anang (penalty scored); Purwanto (penalty scored); Jairon (penalty scored); Bobby (penalty scored); Anderson (penalty scored)	6–5	(penalty missed) Zada; (penalty scored) Costas; (penalty scored) Andika; (penalty scored) Lubis; (penalty scored) Guillen; (penalty scored) Carbiny; (penalty missed) Okto

Siliwangi Stadium, Bandung
Attendance: 18,000
Referee: Yandri

== Awards ==
=== Top scorers ===
This is a list of top scorers in the 2008–09 season.

Rank	Player	Club	Goals
1	(Cameroon) Jean Paul Boumsong	Persikad Depok	17
1	(Indonesia) Mardiansyah	Persikabo Bogor	17
1	(Cameroon) Herman Dzumafo	PSPS	17
4	(Liberia) Edward Wilson	Semen Padang	15
5	(Paraguay) Aldo Baretto	Persisam Samarinda	14
5	(Argentina) Ezequiel González	Persiba Bantul	14
5	(Sierra Leone) Brima Pepito Sanusie	Persema Malang	14
5	(Brazil) Jardel Santana	Persisam Samarinda	14
9	(Indonesia) Agung Suprayogi	Persih Tembilahan	12
9	(Brazil) Jairon	Persebaya Surabaya	12
9	(Mali) Mamadou Niane	Persikab Bandung	12

=== Best Player ===
(Paraguay) Aldo Baretto (Persisam Samarinda)

== See also ==
- 2008-09 Indonesia Super League
