= 2012 Piala Indonesia final =

- Event: 2012 Piala Indonesia
Persibo Bojonegoro	Semen Padang FC
1	0
- Date: 14 July 2012
- Venue: Sultan Agung Stadium, Bantul
- Man of the Match: Dian Irawan (Persibo Bojonegoro)
- Referee: Sudaryanto
- Weather: Fine

The 2012 Piala Indonesia final was a football match that took place on 14 July 2012 at Sultan Agung Stadium in Bantul. It was the sixth final of Piala Indonesia and contested by Persibo Bojonegoro and Semen Padang FC. Persibo won the match 1–0 courtesy of a goal from Dian Irawan in the 50th minute to give them their first Piala Indonesia title. As winners, they gained entry to the 2013 AFC Cup.

== Road to the final ==
Note: In all results below, the score of the finalist is given first (H: home; A: away).

Persibo Bojonegoro				Round	Semen Padang FC			
Opponent	Agg.	1st leg	2nd leg	Round	Opponent	Agg.	1st leg	2nd leg
Persema Malang	4–2	1–1 (A)	3–1 (H)	Third round	Pro Duta FC	5–0	2–0 (H)	3–0 (A)
Arema Indonesia	1–0	0–0 (H)	1–0 (A)	Quarter-finals	PSMS Medan	3–1	2–0 (H)	1–1 (A)
PPSM Magelang	5–2	2–1 (A)	3–1 (H)	Semi-finals	Persebaya Surabaya	3–2	0–2 (A)	3–0 (H)

== Match details ==
14 July 2012
15:00 WIB

Persibo Bojonegoro	1–0	Semen Padang FC
Dian 50'	Report

Sultan Agung Stadium, Bantul
Referee: Sudaryanto

Persibo Bojonegoro	Semen Padang FC

Persibo Bojonegoro: 4-4-2
GK	22	(Indonesia) Fauzi Toldo
DF	5	(Brazil) Lexe	(substituted off) 74'
DF	45	(Indonesia) Harry Saputra
DF	23	(Indonesia) Aang Suparman
DF	8	(Indonesia) Aulia Tri	(substituted off) 84'
MF	44	(Turkmenistan) Mekan Nasyrow
MF	16	(Indonesia) Jajang Paliama
MF	31	(Indonesia) Dian Irawan
MF	20	(Argentina) Gustavo Ortiz
FW	9	(Indonesia) Samsul Arif (c)
FW	11	(Indonesia) Nur Iskandar
Substitutes:
GK	1	(Indonesia) Aditya Harlan
DF	2	(Indonesia) Novan Sasongko
DF	13	(Indonesia) Aries Tuansyah	(substituted in) 74'
MF	17	(Indonesia) Edi Sibung	(substituted in) 84'
FW	7	(Indonesia) Bijahil Chalwa
Manager:
(Brazil) Paulo Camargo

Semen Padang FC: 4-4-2
GK	21	(Indonesia) Jandia Eka Putra
DF	5	(Cameroon) David Pagbe
DF	28	(Indonesia) Abdul Rahman
DF	11	(Indonesia) Hengky Ardiles
DF	25	(Indonesia) Slamet Riyadi
MF	10	(Indonesia) Vendry Mofu	(substituted off) 75'
MF	24	(Indonesia) Muhammad Rizal
MF	8	(Indonesia) Elie Aiboy (c)	(substituted off) 87'
MF	23	(Argentina) Esteban Vizcarra
FW	22	(Liberia) Edward Wilson
FW	7	(Indonesia) Suheri Daud	(substituted off) 17'
Substitutes:
GK	1	(Indonesia) Syamsidar
MF	9	(Indonesia) Mustofa Aji	(substituted in) 75'
MF	31	(Indonesia) Rudi Doang	(substituted in) 87'
MF	32	(Indonesia) Arifan Fitra	(substituted in) 17'
FW	13	(Indonesia) Yosua Pahabol
Manager:
(Indonesia) Suhatman Iman

Man of the Match:
(Indonesia) Dian Irawan (Persibo Bojonegoro)

== See also ==
- 2012 Piala Indonesia
