= 2009–10 Liga Indonesia Premier Division =

Liga Indonesia Premier Division
- Season: 2009–10
- Champions: Persibo Bojonegoro
- Promoted: Persibo Bojonegoro; Delta Putra Sidoarjo; Semen Padang
- Top goalscorer: Edward Wilson (20 goals)

The 2009–10 Liga Indonesia Premier Division (also known as Liga Joss Indonesia for sponsorship reasons) was the 15th season of the Liga Indonesia Premier Division, the second level of the Indonesian football pyramid. The season was held from 25 November 2009 to 29 May 2010.

== Teams ==
From Premier Division

Promoted to Indonesia Super League

- Persisam Samarinda
- Persema Malang
- PSPS Pekanbaru
- Persebaya Surabaya

Relegated to First Division

- Persibat Batang
- PSP Padang
- Persekabpas Pasuruan

To Premier Division

Relegated from Indonesia Super League

- Deltras F.C.
- Persita Tangerang
- PSIS Semarang
- PSMS Medan

Promoted from First Division

- PPSM Magelang
- Persires Rengat
- Pro Duta F.C.
- PS Mojokerto Putra
- Persidafon Dafonsoro
- Persiram Raja Ampat
- Persipro Probolinggo
- Persipasi Bekasi
- PSBI Blitar

Withdrew or disqualified from competition:

- PS Banyuasin
- Persibom Bolaang Mongondow
- Persikad Depok(disqualified)

== Groups ==
The competition was divided into three groups.

Group 1	Group 2	Group 3
Persiraja Banda Aceh	Persikad Depok	PSIR Rembang
PSDS Deli Serdang	Persikota Tangerang	Persiku Kudus
PSAP Sigli	Persikab Bandung Regency	PSIM Yogyakarta
PSSB Bireun	Persis Solo	PSS Sleman
PSMS Medan	Gresik United	Persigo Gorontalo
Semen Padang FC	Persidafon	PS Mojokerto Putra
Persires Rengat	PPSM Sakti Magelang	Persibo Bojonegoro
Persih Tembilahan	PSIS Semarang	Persiram Raja Ampat
Persita Tangerang	Deltras Sidoarjo	Perseman Manokwari
Persikabo Bogor	Mitra Kukar FC	PSBI Blitar
Persipasi Bekasi	PS Pro Duta Sleman	Persipro Probolinggo
	Persiba Bantul	

Notes: PS Banyuasin and Persibom Bolaang Mongondow withdrew their participation in this competition; Persikad Depok was disqualified by Football Association of Indonesia.

== Foreign Players ==
=== West ===
Club	Visa 1	Visa 2	Visa 3	Visa 4
Persih Tembilahan	(Cameroon) Marc Orland Etogou	(Cameroon) Didier Emery Koutouzi Ngamga	(Argentina) Adrián Verón	(Chile) Pablo Andres Rojas Apablaza
Persikabo Bogor	(Japan) Yusuke Sasa	(Argentina) Rodrigo Santoni	(Cameroon) David Pagbe	None
Persipasi Bekasi	(Liberia) Stephen Mennoh	(Cameroon) Fofee Charles Bility	(Cameroon) Gervais Ngana Jouonang	(Cameroon) Jean Paul Boumsong
Persiraja Banda Aceh	(Liberia) Amos Marah Kicmett	(Liberia) Esaiah Pello Benson	(Cameroon) Eli Mayega	(Cameroon) Batoum Urbain Roger
Persires Rengat	(Mali) Sylla Daouda	(Cameroon) Wandjou Olivier	(Cameroon) Christian Desire Nnana Onana	(Guinea) Mamadou Hady Barry
Persita Tangerang	(Argentina) Matías Recio	(Chile) Luis Durán	(Brazil) Antonio Teles	None
PSAP Sigli	(Mali) Maussa Traore	(Cameroon) Mathias Udie	(Brazil) Michel Adolfo de Souza	None
PSDS Deli Serdang	(Nigeria) Gbeneme Friday	(Chile) Angel Alfredo Vera	(Nigeria) Ebus Angel Cnuchukwu	None
PSMS Medan	(Cameroon) George Clement Nyeck Nyobe	(Nigeria) Osas Saha	(Nigeria) Daniel Nwanko Agochukwu	None
PSSB Bireuen	(Cameroon) Ousmane Sao	(Cameroon) Salomon Koube	(Cameroon) Felix Yetna Mouha	None
Semen Padang	(Brazil) Toyo	(Brazil) Marcio Souza	(Liberia) Edward Wilson	None

=== Central ===
Club	Visa 1	Visa 2	Visa 3	Visa 4
Deltras Sidoarjo	(Liberia) Sackie Teh Doe	(Liberia) Roberto Kwateh	(Liberia) Marshall Nagbe	None
Gresik United	(Liberia) Bernard Trokon Mamadou	(Cameroon) Jules Basile Onambele	(Liberia) Varney Pas Boakay	None
Mitra Kukar	(Cameroon) Rufus Armah Salue	(Cameroon) Anderson Pohos	(Argentina) Leonardo Maximiliano Felicia	(Paraguay) Ever Marino Barrientos Salcedo
Persiba Bantul	(Argentina) Luciano Theiler	(Cameroon) Sylvain Moukwelle	(Argentina) Ezequiel González	
Persidafon Dafonsoro	(Cameroon) Bruno Casimir	(Chile) Javier Roca	(Argentina) Carlos Sciucatti	None
Persikab Bandung	(Morocco) Abdelaziz Dnibi	(Nigeria) Peter Lipede	(Nigeria) Udo Fortune	None
Persikota Tangerang	(Cameroon) Daniel Bikoi	(Cameroon) Jacques Evrard	(Cameroon) Salomon Bengondo	None
Persis Solo	(Paraguay) Domingo Villalba	(Paraguay) Jorge Paredes	None	None
PPSM Magelang	(Cameroon) Bidias Samuel	(Cameroon) Georges Nicolas Djone	(Cameroon) Raymond Nsangue	(Chile) Claudio Martínez
Pro Duta	(Cameroon) Emalue Serge	(Liberia) Morris Power	(Morocco) Tarik El Janaby	None
PSIS Semarang	(Brazil) Cristiano Lopes	(Argentina) Gustavo Chena	(Brazil) Anderson Leke	None

=== East ===
Club	Visa 1	Visa 2	Visa 3	Visa 4
Perseman Manokwari	(Brazil) Reginaldo	(Brazil) Zé Luiz	(Nigeria) George Oyedepo	None
Persibo Bojonegoro	(Brazil) Victor da Silva	(Liberia) Abel Cielo	(Liberia) Perry Kollie	None
Persigo Gorontalo	(Cameroon) Henri Bassoubeck	None	None	None
Persiku Kudus	(Cameroon) Christian Bekatal	(Cameroon) Crepin Owang Abong	(Mali) Sékou Camara	None
Persipro Probolinggo	None	None	None	None
Persiram Raja Ampat	(Cameroon) Mbom Mbom Julien	(Liberia) Kubay Quaiyan	(South Africa) Mfundo Mathonsi	None
PS Mojokerto Putra	(Brazil) Evandro	(Burkina Faso) Germain Bationo	(Cameroon) Charles Orock	(Liberia) Patrick Nuku Granue
PSBI Blitar	(Cameroon) Bienvenue Nnengue	(Cameroon) Christian Lenglolo	(Cameroon) Engelbert Asse-Etoga	(Cameroon) Jean Jacques Ngwos
PSIM Yogyakarta	None	None	None	None
PSIR Rembang	(Cameroon) Tassiou Bako	(Ghana) Fassawa Camara	(Liberia) Anthony Ballah	None
PSS Sleman	(Cameroon) Nkomo Bertrand	(Guinea) Mamadou Diallo	(Mali) Bamba Sylla	None

== First round ==
Matches were played from 25 November 2009 to 1 April 2010.

=== Group 1 ===
Pos	Team	Pld	W	D	L	GF	GA	GD	Pts	Qualification
1	Semen Padang	20	12	6	2	33	13	+20	42	Advance to second round
2	Persipasi Bekasi	20	11	4	5	34	21	+13	37	Advance to second round
3	Persita Tangerang	20	9	5	6	26	14	+12	32	
4	Persikabo Bogor (Note: Persikabo Bogor were docked three points.)	20	10	5	5	28	19	+9	32	
5	PSAP Sigli	20	8	3	9	19	18	+1	27	
6	Persih Tembilahan	20	7	6	7	14	14	0	27	
7	Persiraja Banda Aceh	20	7	6	7	18	24	−6	27	
8	PSSB Bireun	20	7	2	11	19	32	−13	23	
9	PSMS Medan	20	5	6	9	15	23	−8	21	
10	PSDS Deli Serdang	20	6	2	12	17	28	−11	20	
11	Persires Rengat	20	4	3	13	17	34	−17	15	

Source: RSSSF

=== Group 2 ===
Pos	Team	Pld	W	D	L	GF	GA	GD	Pts	Qualification
1	Persidafon	20	13	3	4	51	12	+39	42	Advance to second round
2	Persiba Bantul	20	11	4	5	33	16	+17	37	Advance to second round
3	Deltras Sidoarjo	20	11	4	5	21	16	+5	37	Advance to second round
4	Persikab Bandung Regency	20	10	2	8	24	22	+2	32	
5	Gresik United	20	7	5	8	30	23	+7	26	
6	PSIS Semarang	20	7	5	8	22	32	−10	26	
7	Pro Duta	20	8	2	10	21	31	−10	26	
8	Mitra Kukar	20	7	4	9	31	24	+7	25	
9	PPSM Sakti Magelang	20	7	4	9	22	28	−6	25	
10	Persikota Tangerang	20	4	7	9	19	37	−18	19	
11	Persis Solo	20	2	6	12	9	42	−33	12	

Source: RSSSF

=== Group 3 ===
Pos	Team	Pld	W	D	L	GF	GA	GD	Pts	Qualification
1	Persiram Raja Ampat	20	14	2	4	35	15	+20	44	Advance to second round
2	Persibo Bojonegoro	20	12	1	7	31	17	+14	37	Advance to second round
3	PS Mojokerto Putra	20	11	0	9	25	20	+5	33	Advance to second round
4	Persipro Probolinggo	20	10	2	8	17	22	−5	32	
5	Persigo Gorontalo	20	10	1	9	29	20	+9	31	
6	Perseman Manokwari	20	8	4	8	23	17	+6	28	
7	PSIM Yogyakarta	20	6	5	9	22	31	−9	23	
8	PSIR Rembang	20	6	5	9	17	27	−10	23	
9	PSBI Blitar	20	7	2	11	21	32	−11	23	
10	PSS Sleman	20	6	4	10	21	31	−10	22	
11	Persiku Kudus	20	5	4	11	18	27	−9	19	

Source: RSSSF

=== Ranking of third-placed teams ===
Two best-ranked third-placed team will also qualify for the second round.

Pos	Grp	Team	Pld	W	D	L	GF	GA	GD	Pts	Qualification
1	2	Deltras Sidoarjo	20	11	4	5	21	16	+5	37	Advance to second round
2	3	PS Mojokerto Putra	20	11	0	9	25	20	+5	33	Advance to second round
3	1	Persita Tangerang	20	9	5	6	26	14	+12	32	

Source: RSSSF

== Second round ==
Matches were played from 18 May 2010 to 23 May 2010.

Key to colours in group tables
Top two placed teams advance to the Semifinal

Legend
Group winners and second-placed directly qualify for the semi-finals

=== Group A ===
Group A
Pos	Team	Pld	W	D	L	GF	GA	GD	Pts	Qualification
1	Persiram Raja Ampat	3	2	1	0	6	3	+3	7	Advance to second round
2	Semen Padang	3	1	2	0	4	3	+1	5	Advance to second round
3	Persiba Bantul	3	1	1	1	6	4	+2	4	
4	PS Mojokerto Putra	3	0	0	3	3	9	−6	0	

Source: RSSSF

=== Group B ===
Group B
Pos	Team	Pld	W	D	L	GF	GA	GD	Pts	Qualification
1	Deltras Sidoarjo	3	2	1	0	5	3	+2	7	Advance to second round
2	Persibo Bojonegoro	3	2	0	1	3	2	+1	6	Advance to second round
3	Persidafon Dafonsoro	3	1	0	2	5	6	−1	3	
4	Persipasi Bekasi	3	0	1	2	4	6	−2	1	

Source: RSSSF

== Knockout phase ==
=== Bracket ===
Semi-finals
27 May 2010 – Surakarta
Persiram Raja Ampat	0
Persibo Bojonegoro	1
27 May 2010 – Surakarta
Deltras Sidoarjo (p)	0 (4)
Semen Padang	0 (2)

Final
29 May 2010 – Surakarta
Persibo Bojonegoro (p)	0 (3)
Deltras Sidoarjo	0 (1)
Third place
29 May 2010 – Surakarta
Persiram Raja Ampat	0
Semen Padang	1

=== Semifinals ===
27 May 2010
15:30 WIB

Persiram Raja Ampat	0–1	Persibo Bojonegoro
	Report	Irfan 5'

Manahan Stadium, Solo
Attendance: 10,000
27 May 2010
19:00 WIB

Deltras Sidoarjo	0–0 (a.e.t.)	Semen Padang
	Report
Penalties
Satyo (penalty scored); Wahyu (penalty scored); Erfan (penalty scored); Feri (penalty scored)	4–2	(penalty scored) Toyo; (penalty missed) Dedi; (penalty scored) Bayu; (penalty missed) Wilson

Manahan Stadium, Solo
Attendance: 10,000

=== Third-place playoff ===
29 May 2010
15:30 WIB

Persiram Raja Ampat	0–1	Semen Padang
	Report	Wilson 88' (pen.)

Manahan Stadium, Solo
Attendance: 12,000

=== Final ===
29 May 2010
19:00 WIB

Persibo Bojonegoro	0–0 (a.e.t.)	Deltras Sidoarjo
	Report
Penalties
Victor (penalty scored); Nur (penalty scored); Jajang (penalty scored); Cielo (penalty missed)	3–1	(penalty missed) Satyo; (penalty missed) Wahyu; (penalty scored) Fahmi; (penalty missed) Ervan

Manahan Stadium, Solo
Attendance: 25,000

== Promotion/relegation playoff ==
The promotion/relegation play-off match was held in Jakabaring Stadium, Palembang, on 10 Agustus 2010. Persiram Raja Ampat, the 4th-place team in the Liga Indonesia Premier Division played Pelita Jaya, the 15th-place team in the Indonesia Super League. The winner would play in the Indonesia Super League the following season, while the loser would play in the Liga Indonesia Premier Division.

10 Agustus 2010
15:30 WIB

Persiram Raja Ampat	0–0 (a.e.t.)	Pelita Jaya
-		-
Penalties
Giddy Karow (penalty missed); Titus (penalty scored); Gideon (penalty scored); Amiruddin (penalty missed)	2–4	(penalty scored) Barkaoui; (penalty scored) Basri Badussalam; (penalty scored) Jajang; (penalty scored) Ardan

Jakabaring Stadium, Palembang
Attendance: 7,500

Pelita Jaya promoted to the top flight

== Awards ==
=== Top scorers ===
Rank	Scorer	Club	Goals
1	(Liberia) Edward Wilson	Semen Padang	20
2	(Indonesia) Titus Bonai	Persiram Raja Ampat	14
3	(Cameroon) Jean Paul Boumsong	Persipasi Bekasi	13
3	(Chile) Javier Roca	Persidafon Dafonsoro	13
5	(Argentina) Ezequiel González	Persiba Bantul	12
5	(Indonesia) Iksan Abubakar	Persigo Gorontalo	12
7	(Liberia) Abel Cielo	Persibo Bojonegoro	11
7	(Liberia) Perry Kollie	Persibo Bojonegoro	11
7	(Indonesia) Elie Aiboy	Persidafon Dafonsoro	11
10	(Brazil) Evandro	PS Mojokerto Putra	10

=== Best player ===
(Brazil) Victor da Silva (Persibo Bojonegoro)

== See also ==
- 2009-10 Indonesia Super League
- 2010 Piala Indonesia

== Other references ==
- The official website of Liga Indonesia
