= Championship (Indonesia) =

Second tier of Indonesian football

- Organising body: Liga Utama Indonesia
- Founded: 2008; 18 years ago, as Liga Indonesia Premier Division in 2nd tier; 2017; 9 years ago, as Liga 2; 2025; 1 year ago, as Championship
- Country: Indonesia
- Confederation: AFC
- Number of clubs: 20
- Level on pyramid: 2
- Promotion to: Super League
- Relegation to: Liga Nusantara
- Domestic cup: Piala Indonesia
- League cup: I-League Cup
- International cup: AFC Challenge League via domestic cup
- Current champions: Garudayaksa; 1st Championship title 1st second-tier title (2025–26)
- Most championships: Persebaya Surabaya; 3 second-tier titles
- Broadcasters: Terrestrial: Indosiar; Sin Po TV; Pay TV: Nex Parabola; Streaming: Vidio; RANS Entertainment (Persikad and RANS Nusantara matches only)
- Sponsor: Pegadaian
- Website: Official website
- Current: 2026–27 Championship

The Championship (Indonesian: Kejuaraan), officially known as the Pegadaian Championship for sponsorship reasons, is the second-tier of the football competition system in Indonesia, organized by the Liga Utama Indonesia. The competition started in 2017 after PSSI changed the previous competition Liga Indonesia Premier Division (Indonesian: Divisi Utama Liga Indonesia).

Originally, the Premier Division was the top-tier division when it was first established in 1994 and only became the second tier in 2008 when its place in the top flight was replaced by the newly formed Indonesia Super League. The competition is usually divided into several groups because of factors in terms of geography and number of participants.

== History ==
=== Foundation ===
The Premier Division was the first-tier in Liga Indonesia. The system stayed put until 2007. In 2008, PSSI formed the Indonesia Super League (ISL), the first fully professional league in Indonesia, as the new top-tier of Indonesian football. The Premier Division was then being relegated to the second-tier.

As a result of continuing conflict between PT Liga Indonesia (LI) and PT Liga Prima Indonesia Sportindo (LPIS), there were two different Liga Indonesia Premier Division being organized for 2011–12 and 2013 season, one for the Indonesia Super League and the other for Indonesian Premier League. Starting in the 2014 season Premier Division was organized again by PT Liga Indonesia after the dissolution of LPIS.

=== First name change ===
In January 2017, PSSI renamed the competition from Premier Division to Liga 2 along with the change in the name of the league in the top division from Indonesia Super League to Liga 1.

Liga 2 did not use the name of the main sponsor after the name change in 2017 season until Pegadaian, which operates in the financial sector became the main sponsor in the 2023–24 season and changed the name of the league to Pegadaian Liga 2.

=== Second name change and new operator ===
In July 2025, the competition was renamed from Liga 2 to the Championship along with the change in the name of the league in the top division from Liga 1 to the Super League. The management of this league is officially transferring from the I-League to its subsidiary, Liga Utama Indonesia and effective from the 2026–27 season.

== Competition format ==
Here are some regulations that are implemented for the 2025–26 season.

=== Competition ===
There are 20 clubs in Championship, divided into two groups: Group A and Group B. Each group consists of 10 clubs based on geographical location and during the course of the season (from September to May), the teams play each other three times in a triple round-robin system (either once home and twice away or twice home and once away) for a total of 27 games. Teams receive three points for a win, one point for a draw, and no points for a loss. Teams are ranked by total points, then head-to-head records, then goal difference, and then goals scored. If still equal, fair play points and then a drawing of lots decide the ranking.

=== Promotion and relegation ===
The first-place teams from both the Group A and B earn direct promotion to Super League, while the runners-up of each group face each other in a promotion play-off to compete for one additional promotion spot.

The 10th-placed teams from both the Group A and B are directly relegated to Liga Nusantara, while the 9th-placed teams from each group compete in a relegation play-off to determine one more team to be relegated.

=== Video Assistant Referee ===
Video assistant referee (VAR) was introduced to Championship for the first time in the 2024–25 season during the final and promotion play-off matches. The 2025–26 season saw the full implementation of VAR for the first time.

== Teams ==
=== Maps ===
Locations of teams in the 2026–27 Championship.
Red: West region; Blue: East region
Locations of teams in the 2026–27 Championship from Java region.
Red: West region; Blue: East region

.

=== Current participating teams ===
The following 20 clubs will compete in the Championship during 2026–27 season.

Team	Location	2025–26 position	Year joined	Seasons in CH	First season in D2	Seasons in D2	Current spell in D2	Last spell in top flight	Former names	Other leagues
Adhyaksa Bekasi	Bekasi	3rd in Group 1	2014	7	2020 (Note: Include season as Putra Safin Group, AHHA PS Pati and Bekasi City.)	7	2020–	—		—
Barito Putera	Banjarmasin	3rd in Group 2	1994–95	2	2010–11	4	2025–	2013–2025	—	—
de Red	Surabaya	2nd (Liga Nusantara)	2022–23	2	2024–25 (Note: Include season as Dejan.)	2	2026–	—		—
Deltras	Sidoarjo	5th in Group 2	1994–95	5	2009–10	8	2022–	2010–2012	—	—
Kendal Tornado	Kendal	4th in Group 2	2018	2	2025–26	2	2025–	—		—
Persela	Lamongan	6th in Group 2	1994–95	5	2022–23	5	2022–	2008–2022	—	—
Persiba Balikpapan	Balikpapan	Won relegation play-off	1994–95	8	2018	8	2025–	2008–2017	—	—
Persikad	Depok	8th in Group 1	2019	4	2022–23 (Note: Include season as Karo United, Sada Sumut and Sumut United.)	4	2025–	—		—
Persiku	Kudus	7th in Group 2	1994–95	3	2008–09	8	2024–	—	—	—
Persipura	Jayapura	4th	1994–95	5	2022–23	5	2022–	2008–2022	—	—
Persiraja	Banda Aceh	5th in Group 1	1994–95	8	2008–09	14	2022–	2020–2022	—	(Note: 2016 ISC B)
Persis	Surakarta	16th (Super League)	1994–95	6	2008–09	14	2026–	2022–2026	—	(Note: 2011–12 Premier Division (LPIS)) (Note: 2013 Premier Division (LPIS))
PSBS	Biak Numfor	18th (Super League)	1994–95	8	2011	14	2026–	2024–2026	—	—
PSGC	Ciamis	3rd (Liga Nusantara)	1994–95	3	2008–09	6	2026–	—	—	
PSIS	Semarang	8th in Group 2	1994–95	3	2009–10	10	2025–	2018–2025	—	
PSMS	Medan	7th in Group 1	1994–95	9	2009–10	15	2019–	2018	—	
PSPS	Pekanbaru	6th in Group 1	1994–95	10	2008–09	14	2017–	2009–2013	—	
RANS Nusantara	Batu	1st (Liga Nusantara)	2013	7	2015 (Note: Include season as Cilegon United and RANS Cilegon.)	9	2026–	2022–2024		
Semen Padang	Padang	17th (Super League)	1994–95	6	2008–09	8	2026–	2024–2026	—	—
Sumsel United	Palembang	4th in Group 1	1994–95	3	2024–25 (Note: Include season as Persikas Subang.)	3	2024–	—		—

Recently relegated from Super League
Recently promoted from Liga Nusantara

- "Year joined" is the year the club joined the Liga Indonesia, including leagues that are divisionally below it and counted since 1994–95 season.
- "First season in D2" and "Seasons in D2" counted since Premier Division dropped down to second-tier and also including of LPIS Premier Division during dualism era (2011–2013) and ISC B.
- "Last spell in top flight" counted since foundation of Super League, including Indonesian Premier League during dualism era (2011–2013) and ISC A in 2016 season.

Notes

Former names

1. Adhyaksa Bekasi (ADB): previously as Putra Ijen FC.
2. de Red (RED): previously as Dejan.
3. Kendal Tornado (TRD): previously as Tornado Pekanbaru.
4. Persikad (KAD): previously as Karo United.
5. RANS Nusantara (RAN): previously as Cilegon United.
6. Sumsel United (SSU): previously as Persikas Subang.

Breakaway league

Unofficial league

=== Former teams ===
The following clubs competed in the Championship since 2017 season, but are not competing in the 2026–27 season.

Team	Location	Year joined	Seasons in CH	First season in D2	Seasons in D2	Last spell in CH	Current league	Former names	Other leagues
757 Kepri Jaya	Batam	2008–09	1	2014 (Note: Include season as Bintang Jaya Asahan.)	4	2017	Liga 4		(Note: 2016 ISC B)
Badak Lampung	Bandar Lampung	2010	2	2010–11 (Note: Include season as Perseru Serui.)	5	2020–2022	Defunct		—
Bandung United	Bandung City	2012	2	2018 (Note: Include season as Blitar United.)	2	2018–2019	Liga 4		—
Bhayangkara Presisi	Bandar Lampung	2010	1	2010–11 (Note: Include season as Persebaya (DU/ISL) and Bhayangkara.)	4	2024–2025	Super League		—
Celebest	Palu	2000	1	2014 (Note: Include season as Villa 2000.)	4	2017	Liga 4		
Dewa United	Serang	2014	5	2014 (Note: Include season as Martapura FC.)	7	2017–2022	Super League		
Donggala United	Donggala	2011	8	2018 (Note: Include season as Aceh United, Babel United, Muba Babel United and Persipal.)	8	2018–2026	Liga Nusantara		—
Garudayaksa	Bogor	2001	6	2020 (Note: Include season as PSKC Cimahi.)	6	2020–2026	Super League		—
Gresik United	Gresik	2006	3	2008–09	8	2022–2025	Liga Nusantara	—	(Note: 2011–12 Premier Division (LPIS))
Hizbul Wathan	Sidoarjo	2017	4	2017 (Note: Include season as Semeru FC.)	4	2020–2022	Liga 4		—
Isenmulang Kalteng	Palangka Raya	2020	2	2024–25 (Note: Include season as Adhyaksa.)	2	2024–2026	Super League		—
Java United	Semarang	2022	2	2022–23 (Note: Include season as Putra Delta Sidoarjo and Malut United.)	2	2022–2024	Super League		—
Kalteng Putra	Palangka Raya	2001	4	2011–12	7	2020–2024	Defunct	—	
Madiun Putra	Madiun	2009–10	1	2011–12	6	2017	Liga 4	—	
Madura	Sumenep	2004	3	2013 (Note: Include season as Persebo.)	7	2017–2019	—		
Mitra Kukar	Tenggarong	2003	3	2008–09	6	2019–2022	Defunct	—	—
Persatu	Tuban	2010–11	2	2015	4	2019	Liga 4	—	
Persbul	Buol	2009–10	1	2011–12	6	2017	—	—	
Persebaya	Surabaya	1994–95	1	2008–09	2	2017	Super League	—	—
Perseka	Kaimana	2008–09	1	2013	3	2017	Liga 4	—	—
Persekam	Malang	2004	1	2010–11	7	2017	Liga 4	—	
Persekap	Pasuruan	2004	1	2013	5	2017	Liga 4	—	(Note: 2013 Premier Division (LPIS))
Persekat	Tegal	2006	6	2020	6	2020–2026	Liga Nusantara	—	—
Persepam	Pamekasan	2004	1	2011–12	4	2017	Liga 4	—	
Perserang	Serang	2011	7	2015	9	2017–2024	Liga Nusantara	—	
Persewangi	Banyuwangi	1994–95	1	2011–12	6	2017	Liga 4	—	
Persewar	Waropen	2005	6	2019	6	2019–2025	—	—	—
Persiba Bantul	Bantul	2004	1	2015	3	2017	Liga Nusantara	—	
Persibangga	Purbalingga	2006	1	2013	5	2017	Liga Nusantara	—	
Persibas	Banyumas	2004	1	2015	3	2017	Liga 4	—	
Persibat	Batang	2004	3	2008–09	6	2017–2019	Liga 4	—	
Persibo	Bojonegoro	2000	1	2008–09	3	2024–2025	Liga Nusantara	—	—
Persida	Sidoarjo	2004	1	2014	4	2017	Liga 4	—	
Persigubin	Bintang Mountains	2003	1	2014	4	2017	Liga 4	—	
Persih	Indragiri Hulu	2005	1	2008–09	8	2017	—	—	—
Persijap	Jepara	1994–95	5	2015	8	2020–2025	Super League	—	
Persik Kediri	Kediri	1994–95	2	2009–10	5	2019	Super League	—	
Persik Kendal	Kendal	2006	1	2018	1	2018	Liga 4	—	—
Persika	Karawang	2014	2	2014	4	2017–2018	Liga 4	—	
Persikab	Bandung Regency	1995	2	2008–09	8	2022–2024	Liga 4	—	
Persikabo 1973	Bogor	2016	1	2024–25	1	2024–2025	—		—
Persikota	Tangerang City	1994–95	1	2008–09	5	2024–2025	Liga Nusantara	—	
Persikotas Nusantara	Tasikmalaya	2021	3	2022–23 (Note: Include season as Nusantara United and Nusantara Lampung.)	3	2022–2025	Liga Nusantara		—
Persinga	Ngawi	2004	1	2014	4	2017	Liga Nusantara	—	
Persip	Pekalongan	2006	1	2011–12	6	2017	—	—	
Persipa	Pati	1994–95	3	2022–23	3	2022–2025	Liga Nusantara	—	—
Persipon	Pontianak	2004	1	2013	4	2017	Liga 4	—	
Persipur	Grobogan	2002	1	2013	5	2017	Liga 4	—	
Persita	Tangerang Regency	1994–95	3	2009–10	7	2017–2019	Super League	—	
Persiwa	Jayawijaya	1994–95	2	2014	4	2017–2018	Defunct	—	—
Perssu	Sumenep	2004	1	2015	3	2017	Liga 4	—	
PPSM	Magelang	2004	1	2009–10	8	2017	Liga 4	—	
PS Badung	Badung	2008–09	1	2015	2	2017	Liga 4	—	—
PS Bengkulu	Bengkulu	1994–95	1	2010–11	7	2017	—	—	
PS Cordova University	West Sumbawa	2009–10	1	2011–12 (Note: Include season as PS West Sumbawa.)	6	2017	Liga 4		
PS Lampung Sakti	Bandar Lampung	2006	1	2009–10 (Note: Include season as Persires Rengat, Persires Bali Devata, Persires Banjarnegara, Persires Cirebon, Persires Kuningan and Persires Sukoharjo.)	7	2017	Defunct		
PS Mojokerto Putra	Mojokerto	2001	2	2009–10	9	2018	Liga 4	—	
PSBI	Blitar	2004	1	2009–10	8	2017	Liga 4	—	
PSBK	Blitar	2007	1	2011–12	6	2017	Liga 4	—	
PSBL	Langsa	1999–2000	1	2011–12	6	2017	Liga 4	—	
PSCS	Cilacap	1994–95	5	2010–11	14	2019–2024	Liga 4	—	
PSDS	Deli Serdang	1994–95	2	2008–09	5	2022–2024	Liga 4	—	—
PSIM	Yogyakarta	1994–95	8	2008–09	16	2017–2025	Super League	—	
PSIR	Rembang	1994–95	2	2009–10	6	2017–2018	Liga 4	—	
PSS	Sleman	1994–95	3	2008–09	11	2025–2026	Super League	—	
Sragen United	Sragen	2014	1	2015 (Note: Include season as Laga FC.)	3	2017	—		
Sriwijaya	Palembang	2005	7	2019	7	2019–2026	Liga Nusantara	—	—
Sulut United	Manado	2002	6	2008–09 (Note: Include season as Persikad and Bogor FC.)	9	2019–2024	—		—
Tiga Naga	Pekanbaru	2015	2	2020	2	2020–2022	—	—	—
Yahukimo	Yahukimo	1999–00	1	2013	5	2017	—		

Recently promoted to Super League
Recently relegated to Liga Nusantara

- "Year joined" is the year the club joined the Liga Indonesia, including leagues that are divisionally below it and counted since 1994–95 season.
- "First season in D2" and "Seasons in D2" counted since Premier Division dropped down to second-tier and also including of LPIS Premier Division during dualism era (2011–2013) and ISC B.
- "Last spell in CH" counted since foundation of Liga 2.

Notes

Former names

1. 757 Kepri Jaya (757): previously as Bintang Jaya Asahan.
2. Badak Lampung (BDL): previously as Perseru Serui.
3. Bandung United (BDU): previously as Blitar United.
4. Bhayangkara Presisi (BFC): previously as Persikubar West Kutai.
5. Celebest (CEL): previously as Villa 2000.
6. Dewa United (DWU): previously as Martapura FC.
7. Donggala United (DGL): previously as Aceh United.
8. Garudayaksa (GYK): previously as PSKC Cimahi.
9. Hizbul Wathan (HIZ): previously as Semeru FC.
10. Isenmulang Kalteng (KFC): previously as Farmel.
11. Java United (JVU): previously as Putra Delta Sidoarjo.
12. Madura (MDR): previously as Persebo.
13. Persikabo 1973 (PBO): previously as PS TNI.
14. Persikotas Nusantara (TSK): previously as Mataram Utama.
15. PS Cordova University (COR): previously as PS West Sumbawa.
16. PS Lampung Sakti (LSK): previously as Persires Rengat.
17. Sragen United (SRU): previously as Laga FC.
18. Sulut United (SUL): previously as Persikad.
19. Yahukimo (YHK): previously as Persekaba Badung.

Breakaway league

Unofficial league

== Championship history ==
Season	League name	Champions	Score	Runners-up
2008–09	Divisi Utama Esia	Persisam Putra Samarinda	1–0	Persema Malang
2009–10	Liga Joss Indonesia	Persibo Bojonegoro	0–0 (a.e.t.) (3–1 p)	Deltras Sidoarjo
2010–11	Liga Ti-Phone	Persiba Bantul	1–0	Persiraja Banda Aceh
2011–12 (LPIS)	Divisi Utama	Persepar Palangkaraya	round robin	Pro Duta
2011–12 (LI)	Divisi Utama	Barito Putera	2–1	Persita Tanggerang
2013 (LPIS)	Divisi Utama	PSS Sleman	2–1	Lampung
2013 (LI)	Divisi Utama	Persebaya DU	2–0	Perseru Serui
2014	Divisi Utama	Pusamania Borneo	2–1	Persiwa Wamena
2015	Divisi Utama	season abandoned due to FIFA suspension of Indonesia		
2017	Liga 2	Persebaya Surabaya	3–2 (a.e.t.)	PSMS Medan
2018	Liga 2	PSS Sleman	2–0	Semen Padang
2019	Liga 2	Persik Kediri	3–2	Persita Tangerang
2020	Liga 2	season abandoned due to COVID-19 pandemic in Indonesia		
2021	Liga 2	Persis Solo	2–1	RANS Cilegon
2022–23	Liga 2	season abandoned after Kanjuruhan Stadium disaster		
2023–24	Pegadaian Liga 2	PSBS Biak	6–0 (3–0 / 3–0)	Semen Padang
2024–25	Pegadaian Liga 2	PSIM Yogyakarta	2–1 (a.e.t.)	Bhayangkara Presisi
2025–26	Pegadaian Championship	Garudayaksa	2–2 (a.e.t.) (4–3 p)	PSS Sleman

== Promotion history ==
Season	Champions	Runners-up	Third place	Fourth place
2008–09	Persisam Samarinda	Persema Malang	PSPS Pekanbaru	Persebaya Surabaya^{‡}
2009–10	Persibo Bojonegoro	Deltras Sidoarjo	Semen Padang	Persiram Raja Ampat^{†}
2010–11	Persiba Bantul	Persiraja Banda Aceh	Mitra Kukar	Persidafon Jayapura^{‡}
2011–12 (LPIS)	Persepar Palangkaraya	Pro Duta	Perseman Manokwari	—N/a
2011–12 (LI)	Barito Putera	Persita Tangerang	Persepam Madura United	PSIM Yogyakarta^{†}
2013 (LI)	Persebaya DU (Bhayangkara)	Perseru Serui	Persik Kediri	Persikabo Bogor^{†}
2014	Pusamania Borneo	Persiwa Wamena	—N/a	—N/a
2017	Persebaya Surabaya	PSMS Medan	PSIS Semarang	—N/a
2018	PSS Sleman	Semen Padang	Kalteng Putra	—N/a
2019	Persik Kediri	Persita Tangerang	Persiraja Banda Aceh	—N/a
2021	Persis Solo	RANS Cilegon	Dewa United	—N/a
2023–24	PSBS Biak	Semen Padang	Malut United	—N/a
2024–25	PSIM Yogyakarta	Bhayangkara Presisi	Persijap Jepara	—N/a
2025–26	Garudayaksa	PSS Sleman	Adhyaksa Banten	—N/a

* Bold designates the promoted club
† Lost the promotion/relegation playoff
‡ Won the promotion/relegation playoff and got promoted

== Relegation history ==
Season	Relegated teams	Total
2008–09	Persibat Batang; PSP Padang; Persekabpas Pasuruan; Persma Manado (withdrew); Persidago Gorontalo (withdrew); Persmin Minahasa (withdrew); Persiter Ternate (withdrew); Persegi Gianyar (withdrew)	8
2011–12 (LPIS)	Persikota Tangerang; PSP Padang; Gresik United	3
2013 (LI)	PSGL Gayo Lues (withdrew); PSAB Aceh Besar (withdrew); Persipas Paser (withdrew)	3
2014	PS Kwarta; PSAP Sigli; Persisko Bangko; Persipasi Bekasi; Persikab Bandung; Persiku Kudus; Persitema Temanggung; Perseman Manokwari; Perseta Tulungagung; Deltras Sidoarjo; Persid Jember; Perseka Kaimana; Persitara North Jakarta (withdrew); Persenga Nganjuk (withdrew); Persidafon Dafonsoro (withdrew)	15
2017	757 Kepri Jaya; PSBL Langsa; Persih Tembilahan; Pro Duta; Persikad Depok; PS Bengkulu; PS Lampung Sakti; Persikabo Bogor; Persibas Banyumas; Persip Pekalongan; Persijap Jepara; Persibangga Purbalingga; Sragen United; PPSM Magelang; Persipon Pontianak; Persiba Bantul; Persatu Tuban; Persinga Ngawi; Madiun Putra; PSBI Blitar; Persewangi Banyuwangi; Perssu Sumenep; Persida Sidoarjo; PS Badung; PS West Sumbawa; Persekap Pasuruan; Persigubin Bintang Mountains; Persbul Buol; Persifa Fakfak; Persepam Madura Utama; Celebest; Yahukimo; Persik Kediri; PS Timah Babel; PSGC Ciamis; Persekam Metro; Perseka Manokwari; PSCS Cilacap; PSBK Blitar; Persipur Purwodadi	40

Season	Relegated teams (points)		Total
Season	West region	East region	Total
2018	Persika Karawang (24); PSIR Rembang (22); Persik Kendal (22)	Persegres Gresik United (26); Semeru (19); Persiwa Wamena (7)	6
2019	PSGC Ciamis (19); Persibat Batang (16); Bandung United (12)	Madura (23); Persatu Tuban (20); PS Mojokerto Putra (disqualified)	6

Season	Relegated teams	Total
2021	Badak Lampung; Hizbul Wathan; KS Tiga Naga; Mitra Kukar	4
2023–24	Kalteng Putra; Perserang Serang; Persiba Balikpapan; Persikab Bandung; PSCS Cilacap; PSDS Deli Serdang; Sada Sumut; Sulut United	8
2024–25	Dejan; Gresik United; Nusantara United; Persewar Waropen; Persibo Bojonegoro; Persikabo 1973; Persikota Tangerang; Persipa Pati; RANS Nusantara	9
2025–26	Persekat Tegal; Persipal Palu; Sriwijaya	3

== Foreign players ==
Championship's policy on foreign players has changed multiple times since its inception.

- 2008–2009: 3 foreign players.
- 2009–2010: 4 foreign players.
- 2010–2012: 3 foreign players.
- 2014 : 2 foreign players.
- 2015–2023 : No foreign players quota.
- 2023–2024: 2 foreign players including 1 Asian quota.
- 2024–present: 3 foreign players.

== Awards ==
=== Best players ===
Season	Player	Club
2008–09	(Paraguay) Aldo Barreto	Persisam Putra Samarinda
2009–10	(Brazil) Victor da Silva	Persibo Bojonegoro
2010–11	(Indonesia) Wahyu Wijiastanto	Persiba Bantul
2011–12 (LPIS)	(Nigeria) George Oyedepo	Persepar Palangkaraya
2011–12 (LI)	(Chile) Cristian Carrasco	Persita Tangerang
2013 (LPIS)	not awarded	
2013 (LI)	(Cameroon) Jean Paul Boumsong	Persebaya (DU)
2014	(Liberia) Sengbah Kennedy	Persiwa Wamena
2017	(Indonesia) Irfan Jaya	Persebaya Surabaya
2018	(Indonesia) Ichsan Pratama	PSS Sleman
2019	(Indonesia) Taufiq Febriyanto	Persik Kediri
2021	(Indonesia) Rifal Lastori	RANS Cilegon
2023–24	(Brazil) Alexsandro	PSBS Biak
2024–25	(Brazil) Rafinha	PSIM Yogyakarta
2025–26	(Brazil) Gustavo Tocantins	PSS Sleman

=== Top scorers ===
Season	Top scorer(s)	Club(s)	Goals
2008–09	(Cameroon) Herman Dzumafo	PSPS Pekanbaru	17
2008–09	(Cameroon) Jean Paul Boumsong	Persikad Depok	17
2008–09	(Indonesia) Mardiansyah	Persikabo Bogor	17
2009–10	(Liberia) Edward Junior Wilson	Semen Padang	20
2010–11	(Nigeria) Udo Fortune	Persiba Bantul	34
2011–12 (LPIS)	(Liberia) Abel Cielo	Perseman Manokwari	11
2011–12 (LI)	(Liberia) Sackie Teah Doe	Barito Putera	18
2013 (LPIS)	not awarded		
2013 (LI)	(Cameroon) Jean Paul Boumsong	Persebaya (DU)	18
2013 (LI)	(Liberia) Oliver Makor	Persik Kediri	18
2014	(Liberia) Yao Rudy Abblode	Persiwa Wamena	17
2017	(Indonesia) Rivaldi Bawuo	Kalteng Putra	17
2018	(Indonesia) Indra Setiawan	PS Mojokerto Putra	29
2019	(Indonesia) Sirvi Arvani	Persita Tangerang	14
2021	(Indonesia) Alberto Gonçalves	Persis Solo	11
2023–24	(Brazil) Alexsandro	PSBS Biak	19
2024–25	(Indonesia) Ramai Rumakiek	Persipura Jayapura	22
2025–26	(Brazil) Adilson Silva	Adhyaksa Banten	26

== Title sponsors ==
Period	Sponsor(s)	Brand	Ref.
2008–2009	Esia	Esia Divisi Utama	
2009–2010	Extra Joss	Liga Joss Indonesia	
2010–2011	Ti-Phone	Liga Ti-Phone	
2012–2016	no sponsors	Divisi Utama	
2017–2023	no sponsors	Liga 2	
2023–2025	Pegadaian	Pegadaian Liga 2	
2025–present	Pegadaian	Pegadaian Championship	

== Broadcasting partner ==
Broadcaster	Year	Ref.
ANTV	2008–2013	
tvOne	2013, 2017–2019	
First Media and Big TV	2014	
OrangeTV	2017–2018	
iflix	2017–2018	
Telkom Indonesia	2018–2022	
Vidio	2018–present	
Nex Parabola	2019, 2021–present	
Kompas TV	2020	
MNC Vision Networks	2020–2021, 2023–2025	
Indosiar	2021–present	
Moji	2021–2022, 2024	
Sin Po TV	2025–present	

== See also ==
- Indonesian football league system
- Super League
- Liga Nusantara
- Liga 4
- Piala Indonesia
- Piala Presiden
- I-League Cup
