= Tarik El Janaby =

Moroccan footballer

Personal information
- Full name: Tarik El Janaby
- Date of birth: 29 June 1984 (age 42)
- Place of birth: Casablanca, Morocco
- Height: 1.78 m (5 ft 10 in)
- Position: Midfielder

Senior career*
Years	Team	Apps	(Gls)
2003–2004	Raja Casablanca	20	(14)
2004–2005	ES Beni-Khalled	28	(10)
2005–2006	Sriwijaya	11	(0)
2006–2007	Pahang	19	(4)
2007	Arema Malang	9	(0)
2008	Bontang PKT	24	(3)
2009	Pro Duta	15	(2)
2010–2011	Al Ahli Club	14	(6)
2011–2012	CR Al Hoceima	25	(1)
2012–2013	Sheikh Russel	16	(7)
2013–2014	Al Ahli Club	22	(8)
2015–2016	Kuantan FA	8	(0)
2016	Chittagong Abahani	22	(1)
2021	RANS Cilegon	9	(2)
2022–2023	Adhyaksa Farmel	5	(0)
2023	Persibo Bojonegoro	0	(0)
- * Club domestic league appearances and goals as of 8 February 2023

Tarik El Janaby (born 29 June 1984) is a Moroccan professional footballer who last played as a midfielder for Liga 3 club Persibo Bojonegoro.

== Club career ==
El Janaby spent most of his career in Asia, with Indonesian clubs Sriwijaya F.C., Arema FC, Bontang PKT and Pro Duta; Qatari club Al Ahli SC; Malaysian Pahang FA; and Morocco League Chabab Rif Al Hoceima.

=== RANS Cilegon ===
In 2021 Tarik El Janaby Returning Career In Indonesia Joined Indonesian Liga 2 Club RANS Cilegon. He made his debut on 5 October 2021 in a match against Persekat Tegal at the Gelora Bung Karno Madya Stadium, Jakarta. And Tarik scored his first goal for RANS Cilegon in the 36th minute against.

== Personal life ==
Born and raised in Morocco, he acquired Indonesian citizenship in 2021.

== Honours ==
=== Club ===
RANS Cilegon

- Liga 2 runner-up: 2021
