= Busari =

Indonesian footballer (born 1986)

Personal information
- Full name: Busari
- Date of birth: 23 October 1986 (age 40)
- Place of birth: Kendal, Indonesia
- Height: 1.72 m (5 ft 8 in)
- Position: Winger

Youth career
- 2002−2005: PSS Sleman

Senior career*
Years	Team	Apps	(Gls)
2005−2006	Persiba Bantul	14	(1)
2006−2008	PSS Sleman	27	(7)
2009−2010	Persibo Bojonegoro	18	(2)
2010−2012	Persiba Bantul	29	(4)
2013−2015	Persepam Madura Utama	50	(6)
2016−2017	PSS Sleman	37	(11)
2018	Persibat Batang	21	(3)
2018	PSS Sleman	7	(2)
2019–2020	Sulut United	9	(2)
2021	Persijap Jepara	7	(1)
2022–2024	Serpong City	13	(6)
- * Club domestic league appearances and goals as of 8 May 2024

Busari (born 23 October 1986) is an Indonesian professional footballer who plays as a winger.

== Honours ==
Persibo Bojonegoro

- Liga Indonesia Premier Division: 2009–10

Persiba Bantul

- Liga Indonesia Premier Division: 2010–11

PSS Sleman

- Liga 2: 2018

Serpong City

- Liga 3 Banten zone: 2022
