= Oyedepo =

Oyèdépò is a Yoruba surname meaning "chieftaincy has reached its position". Notable people with the surname include:

- David Oyedepo (born 1954), Nigerian Christian author, businessman, and architect
- George Oyebode Oyedepo (born 1985), Nigerian footballer
- Stella Oyedepo (born 1950s), Nigerian playwright
