= Patrick Nuku Granue =

Liberian footballer

Patrick Granue
Personal information
- Full name: Patrick Nuku Granue
- Date of birth: March 1, 1975 (age 51)
- Place of birth: Monrovia, Liberia
- Position: Defender

Senior career*
Years	Team	Apps	(Gls)
2000–2002	FC Kochin		
2002–2003	Invincible Eleven		
2004	Mighty Barolle		
2005–2006	LPRC Oilers		
2007–2008	Persibo Bojonegoro		
2009–2010	PS Mojokerto Putra		

International career
2000–2003	Liberia	10	(0)
- * Club domestic league appearances and goals as of 13:42, 18 December 2007 (UTC)

Patrick Nuku Granue (born March 1, 1975) is a Liberian former footballer who played as a defender.
