= Anderson dos Santos =

Anderson dos Santos may refer to:

- Lexe (born 1977), Brazilian footballer named Anderson dos Santos
- Kanu (footballer, born 1985), Brazilian footballer named Anderson dos Santos
- Anderson dos Santos (fighter) (born 1985), Brazilian mixed martial arts fighter
- Anderson Jorge dos Santos (born 1972), Brazilian track and field sprinter
