= Indra Setiawan =

Indonesian association footballer

Personal information
- Full name: Indra Setiawan
- Date of birth: 11 September 1990 (age 36)
- Place of birth: Sidoarjo, Indonesia
- Height: 1.70 m (5 ft 7 in)
- Position: Forward

Youth career
- 2007–2008: Deltras

Senior career*
Years	Team	Apps	(Gls)
2009–2012	Deltras	33	(0)
2013	Gresik United	6	(0)
2014	Persida Sidoarjo	8	(1)
2015	PSIS Semarang	0	(0)
2016	Bhayangkara	2	(0)
2017–2018	PS Mojokerto Putra	47	(41)
2019	PSCS Cilacap	6	(0)
2019–2021	Persiba Balikpapan	18	(3)
2022	Putra Delta Sidoarjo	5	(3)
2023–2024	PSIM Yogyakarta	12	(1)
- * Club domestic league appearances and goals as of 6 February 2024 (UTC)

Indra Setiawan (born 11 September 1990 in Sidoarjo) is an Indonesian professional footballer, who last played as a forward for Liga 2 club PSIM Yogyakarta.

== Honours ==
Deltras

- Liga Indonesia Premier Division runner up: 2009–10

Individual

- Liga 2 Top Goalscorer: 2018
