= Jajang Paliama =

Indonesian footballer (1984–2024)

Personal information
- Full name: Jajang Paliama Mujianto
- Date of birth: 6 June 1984
- Place of birth: Kediri, Indonesia
- Date of death: 11 May 2024 (aged 39)
- Place of death: Kediri, Indonesia
- Height: 1.70 m (5 ft 7 in)
- Position: Midfielder

Senior career*
Years	Team	Apps	(Gls)
2004–2006	PS Mojokerto Putra	22	(2)
2006–2008	Persid Jember	25	(1)
2008–2009	Gresik United	18	(0)
2009–2012	Persibo Bojonegoro	37	(2)
2012–2013	Semen Padang	48	(1)
2014–2015	Persepam Madura Utama	28	(5)
2015–2016	Persatu Tuban	19	(0)
2016	Persik Kediri	13	(0)
2017–2018	Semeru	10	(0)
Total		220	(11)

International career
2012	Indonesia	2	(0)
- * Club domestic league appearances and goals

Jajang Paliama Mujianto (6 June 1984 – 11 May 2024) was an Indonesian professional footballer who played as a midfielder.

== Career ==
On 3 November 2014, he was released by Semen Padang.

== Death ==
Jajang died in a traffic collision in Maron, Kediri, on 11 May 2024, at the age of 39.

== Honours ==
Persibo Bojonegoro

- Liga Indonesia Premier Division: 2009–10
- Piala Indonesia: 2012

Semen Padang

- Indonesian Community Shield: 2013
