= Iwan Setiawan =

Indonesian football manager (1958–2026)

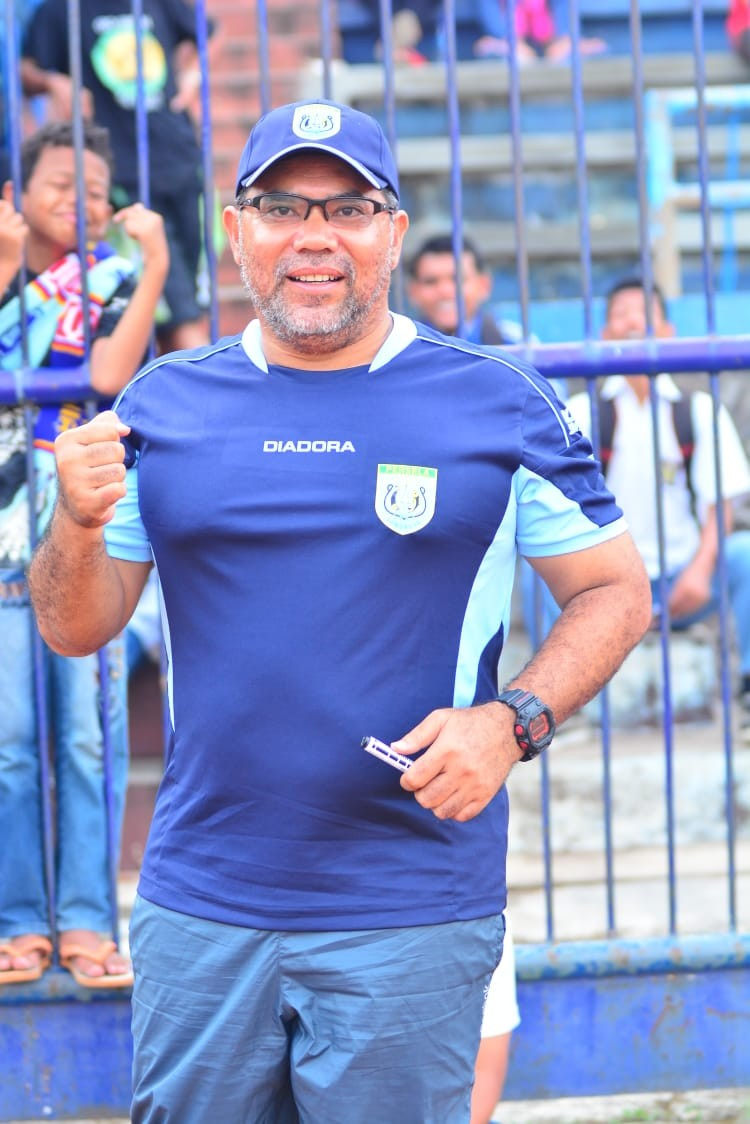

Personal information
- Date of birth: 5 July 1958
- Place of birth: Medan, North Sumatra, Indonesia
- Date of death: September 2026 (aged 68)

Managerial career
- Years: Team
- 1997: Persija Junior
- 1998: Persikabo Bogor
- 2001: Persija Jakarta
- 2002: Persijatim Solo FC
- 2002: Persekaba Badung
- 2004–2005: Indonesia U17
- 2006–2007: Persibom Bolaang Mongondow
- 2008: PSMS Medan
- 2009: Persibom Bolaang Mongondow
- 2011–2012: Persija Jakarta
- 2014: Pusamania Borneo
- 2015: Pusamania Borneo
- 2015: Persela Lamongan
- 2017: Persebaya Surabaya
- 2017–2018: Borneo
- 2019: Persidi Idi
- 2021: Persela Lamongan
- 2021–2022: Serpong City
- 2022: PS Siak
- 2023–2025: Persibo Bojonegoro
- 2026: Persema Malang
- 2026: Sriwijaya FC

Iwan Setiawan (5 July 1958 – September 2026) was an Indonesian football manager, who was latterly the football coach of the Championship club Sriwijaya FC.

Setiawan's death at the age of 68 was announced on 3 September 2026.

== Honours ==
Pusamania Borneo

- Liga Indonesia Premier Division (level 2)
  - Champions: 2014
