= Dwi Kuswanto =

Indonesian footballer

Personal information
- Full name: Dwi Kuswanto
- Date of birth: 16 August 1985 (age 41)
- Place of birth: Sidoarjo, Indonesia
- Height: 1.80 m (5 ft 11 in)
- Position: Goalkeeper

Senior career*
Years	Team	Apps	(Gls)
2008	Persibo Bojonegoro	0	(0)
2009	Deltras Sidoarjo	18	(0)
2010	Persikabo Bogor	1	(0)
2010–2011	Persibo Bojonegoro	0	(0)
2013	Persiwa Wamena	22	(0)
2014	Persisam Samarinda	4	(0)
2015	Persepam Madura Utama	0	(0)
2015–2016	Persatu Tuban	1	(0)
2016	Persela Lamongan	6	(0)
2017	Arema	9	(0)
2018–2019	Persela Lamongan	49	(0)
2020–2021	TIRA-Persikabo	2	(0)
2021–2022	Persela Lamongan	24	(0)
2022–2023	Borneo	6	(0)
2023–2024	PSKC Cimahi	14	(0)
2025	Persebi Boyolali	16	(0)
2025–2026	RANS Nusantara	3	(0)
- * Club domestic league appearances and goals as of 15 January 2026

Dwi Kuswanto (born 16 August 1985) is an Indonesian former footballer who plays as a goalkeeper.

== Honours ==
Deltras Sidoarjo

- Liga Indonesia Premier Division runner up: 2009–10

Arema

- Indonesia President's Cup: 2017

Persebi Boyolali

- Liga 4 Central Java: 2024–25

RANS Nusantara

- Liga Nusantara: 2025–26
