= Khoirul Mashuda =

Indonesian footballer

Personal information
- Full name: Khoirul Mashuda
- Date of birth: 8 August 1982 (age 44)
- Place of birth: Sidoarjo, Indonesia
- Height: 1.73 m (5 ft 8 in)
- Position: Midfielder

Senior career*
Years	Team	Apps	(Gls)
2003–2005	Persida Sidoarjo	20	(0)
2005	Persidafon Dafonsoro	12	(0)
2006	Persiter Ternate	19	(0)
2006−2007	Persiraja Banda Aceh	45	(2)
2008−2009	Persisam Samarinda	22	(0)
2009−2012	Deltras Sidoarjo	77	(1)
2012–2015	Persepam Madura Utama	52	(3)
Total		247	(6)
- * Club domestic league appearances and goals

Khoirul Mashuda (born 8 August 1982) is an Indonesian former footballer.

== Honours ==
Deltras Sidoarjo

- Liga Indonesia Premier Division runner up: 2009–10
