= Dodok Anang =

Indonesian footballer

Personal information
- Full name: Dodok Anang Zuanto
- Date of birth: 13 January 1983 (age 43)
- Place of birth: Sidoarjo, Indonesia
- Height: 1.76 m (5 ft 9 1/2 in)
- Position: Defender

Senior career*
Years	Team	Apps	(Gls)
2007	Persegi Gianyar	8	(0)
2007	PSSB Bireuen	5	(0)
2008–2009	Mitra Kukar	19	(0)
2009–2011	Deltras	40	(0)
2011–2013	Sriwijaya	26	(0)
2014–2015	Persela Lamongan	15	(0)
2016–2017	Persik Kediri	18	(0)
Total		131	(0)
- * Club domestic league appearances and goals

Dodok Anang Zuanto (born 13 January 1983, in Sidoarjo, East Java) is an Indonesian former footballer.

== Honours ==
Deltras

- Liga Indonesia Premier Division runner up: 2009–10
