= Satyo Husodo =

Indonesian footballer

Personal information
- Full name: Satyo Husodo
- Date of birth: 22 February 1983 (age 43)
- Place of birth: Indonesia
- Height: 1.70 m (5 ft 7 in)
- Position: Striker

Senior career*
Years	Team	Apps	(Gls)
2007	Persewangi Banyuwangi	11	(7)
2008–2009	Mitra Kukar	25	(3)
2009–2011	Deltras Sidoarjo	23	(9)
2011–2012	Gresik United	3	(0)
2012–2015	Barito Putera	35	(1)
2016–2017	Persipa Pati	22	(2)
Total		119	(22)
- * Club domestic league appearances and goals

Satyo Husodo (born 22 February 1983) is an Indonesian former footballer.

== Club statistics ==
Club	Season	Super League		Premier Division		Piala Indonesia		Total	
Club	Season	Apps	Goals	Apps	Goals	Apps	Goals	Apps	Goals
Mitra Kukar FC	2008-09	-		??	3	??	1	??	4
Deltras Sidoarjo	2009-10	-		13	8	3	1	16	9
Deltras Sidoarjo	2010-11	10	1	-		-		10	1
Gresik United	2011-12	3	0	-		-		3	0
Barito Putera	2011-12	-		??	1	-		??	1
Total		13	1	??	12	??	2	??	15

== Honours ==
Deltras Sidoarjo

- Liga Indonesia Premier Division runner up: 2009–10
