= Danil Junaidi =

Indonesian footballer

Personal information
- Full name: Danil Junaidi
- Date of birth: 15 January 1986 (age 40)
- Place of birth: Kuantan Singingi, Indonesia
- Height: 1.70 m (5 ft 7 in)
- Position: Right-back

Team information
- Current team: Pekanbaru Warriors
- Number: 15

Youth career
- 2004–2006: Persemai Dumai

Senior career*
Years	Team	Apps	(Gls)
2006–2015	PSPS Pekanbaru	102	(2)
2016–2017	Persegres Gresik	7	(0)
2017	Persih Tembilahan	0	(0)
2019–2022	PSPS Riau	28	(0)
2022–	Pekanbaru Warriors	3	(0)
- * Club domestic league appearances and goals as of 16 January 2023

Danil Junaidi (born 15 January 1986) is an Indonesian professional footballer who plays as a right-back for and captains Liga 3 club Pekanbaru Warriors.

== Club career ==
=== PSPS Riau ===
He was signed for PSPS Riau to play in Liga 2 in the 2019 season.
