= Dian Irawan =

Indonesian footballer

Personal information
- Full name: Dian Irawan
- Date of birth: 14 November 1984 (age 41)
- Place of birth: Bogor, Indonesia
- Height: 1.68 m (5 ft 6 in)
- Position: Midfielder

Senior career*
| Years | Team | Apps | (Gls) |
| 2006 | PSB Bogor | | |
| 2007–2008 | Semen Padang | 5 | (0) |
| 2008–2009 | Persikabo Bogor | 10 | (1) |
| 2009–2010 | Persipasi Bekasi | 20 | (0) |
| 2010–2011 | Persikabo Bogor | 29 | (5) |
| 2011–2012 | Persibo Bojonegoro | 14 | (2) |
| 2012–2014 | Putra Samarinda | 42 | (0) |
| 2015–2016 | Gresik United | 2 | (0) |
| 2016 | Mitra Kukar | 19 | (0) |
- * Club domestic league appearances and goals

Dian Irawan (born 14 November 1984) is an Indonesian former footballer who plays as a midfielder.

== Club career ==
In December 2014, he signed with Gresik United.

== Honours ==
=== Club ===
Persibo Bojonegoro

Winner

- Piala Indonesia: 2012

=== Individual ===
- Piala Indonesia Best Player: 2012
