= Morris Bayour Power =

Liberian footballer

Morris Power
Personal information
- Full name: Morris Bayour Power
- Date of birth: 13 March 1985 (age 41)
- Place of birth: Monrovia, Liberia
- Height: 1.85 m (6 ft 1 in)
- Position: Defender

Senior career*
Years	Team	Apps	(Gls)
2006–2007	PS Palembang		
2007–2008	Persibat		
2008–2009	Persibo Bojonegoro		
2009–2010	Pro Duta F.C.		
2010–2013	Persipasi Bekasi		
2013–2014	PSIS Semarang		
2014–2015	PSGC Galuh Ciamis		
- * Club domestic league appearances and goals

Morris Bayour Power (born 13 March 1984) is a Liberian former professional football player who played for PSGC Galuh Ciamis in the Liga Indonesia Premier Division
