= Achmad Sumardi =

Indonesian footballer

Personal information
- Full name: Achmad Sumardi
- Date of birth: 2 May 1980 (age 46)
- Place of birth: Mamasa, Indonesia
- Height: 1.67 m (5 ft 5 1/2 in)
- Position: Defender

Senior career*
Years	Team	Apps	(Gls)
2009–2011	Persibo Bojonegoro		
2011–2012	PSIS Semarang		
2012–2013	Persisam Putra Samarinda	29	(0)
2014	Sriwijaya	10	(0)
2015–2016	Persiram Raja Ampat	2	(0)
2016	PSM Makassar	10	(0)
- * Club domestic league appearances and goals as of 22:49, 12 September 2014 (UTC)

Achmad Sumardi (born 2 May 1980) is an Indonesian former footballer who plays as a defender.

== Career ==
He moved from Putra Samarinda to Sriwijaya in November 2013.
