= Perry Kollie =

Liberian footballer

Personal information
- Full name: Perry Sah Kollie
- Date of birth: 3 December 1982 (age 43)
- Place of birth: Monrovia, Liberia
- Height: 1.65 m (5 ft 5 in)
- Position: Striker

Senior career*
Years	Team	Apps	(Gls)
2000–2001	Invincible Eleven		
2001	ASEC Mimosas		
2005	Persikota Tangerang		
2006–2009	Perserang Serang		
2009–2011	Persibo Bojonegoro		
2011–2012	Royal Wahingdoh	6	(2)
2012–2013	Invincible Eleven		
2014	Phichit		

International career
2010–2013	Liberia	3	(0)
- * Club domestic league appearances and goals

Perry San Kollie (born 3 December 1982) is a Liberian former footballer who played as a striker.

== Career ==
Born in Monrovia, Kollie played for Invincible Eleven, ASEC Mimosas, Persikota Tangerang, Perserang Serang, Persibo Bojonegoro, Royal Wahingdoh and Phichit.

Kollie made his international debut for Liberia in 2010, earning 3 caps in total.
