= Stella Oyedepo =

Nigerian playwright (1949–2019)

- Born: Nigeria
- Occupations: Playwright, Dramatist
- Writing career
- Language: English
- Genre: Drama
- Notable works: The Rebellion of the Bumpy-Chested; The Missing Face

Stella Moroundia Morounmubo Oyedepo (sometimes Stella Dia Oyedepo; 7 May 1949 – 22 April 2019) was a Nigerian playwright. Until her death, 22 April 2019, she was the General Manager / CEO of the National Theatre, Iganmu, Lagos.

== Biography ==
Oyedepo's origins are from Ondo State. She trained as a linguist, and for some time in the 1980s, she served as Senior Principal Lecturer at the Kwara State College for Education in Ilorin. She has also served as director of the Kwara State Council for Arts and Culture. Many of her plays were commissioned for specific occasions.She was survived by her husband Dr. Hezekiah Bamidele Oyedepo, four children and eleven grandchildren.

== Career ==
Oyedepo has written over 300 plays over the course of her career; of these, only around 30 have been published. She takes her subject daily life, problems and her work. She often, addresses such themes as marriage, corruption, politics, and family life. A typical example is her 1988 play “The Greatest Gift”, which contrasts the life of a family destroyed by the father's drunkenness with the life of a successful family. Her 2001 play titled, “Brain Has No Gender” was written for the Kwara State Ministry of Education for Women-in-Science Programme. Her first play, titled, “Our Wife is Not a Woman” was written in 1979.
