= Stephen Mennoh =

Liberian footballer

Personal information
- Full name: Stephen Nagbe Mennoh
- Date of birth: June 5, 1984 (age 42)
- Place of birth: Monrovia, Liberia
- Height: 1.75 m (5 ft 9 in)
- Position: Midfielder

Senior career*
Years	Team	Apps	(Gls)
2003–2004	LPRC Oilers	13	(0)
2005–2006	Semen Padang	29	(0)
2006–2007	Sriwijaya	23	(0)
2007–2008	Persita Tangerang	27	(2)
2008–2009	Semen Padang	30	(5)
2009–2011	Persipasi Bekasi	32	(9)
2012–2013	Persiraja Banda Aceh	18	(0)
2013	Persepam Madura United	0	(0)
2014–2015	Persipasi Bekasi	14	(2)

International career
2003–2010	Liberia	10	(3)
- * Club domestic league appearances and goals as of 13:42, 15 December 2007 (UTC)

Stephen Nagbe Mennoh (born June 5, 1984) is a Liberian former footballer. He was also a former member of the Liberia national football team.
