= Modestus Setiawan =

Indonesian footballer

Personal information
- Full name: Modestus Setiawan
- Date of birth: 17 December 1982 (age 43)
- Place of birth: Semarang, Indonesia
- Height: 1.72 m (5 ft 7 1/2 in)
- Position: Full back

Youth career
- Persak Kebumen

Senior career*
Years	Team	Apps	(Gls)
2003−2004	Persijatim Solo	52	(10)
2005−2008	PSIS Semarang	24	(1)
2008−2009	Mitra Kukar	22	(0)
2009−2011	PSIS Semarang	30	(4)
2011−2012	Persewangi Banyuwangi	22	(0)
2012−2013	Persis Solo	29	(4)
2013	PSIS Semarang	11	(0)
2015–2017	Persak Kebumen	32	(2)
Total		222	(21)

International career
2005−2007	Indonesia U-23	2	(0)
- * Club domestic league appearances and goals

Modestus Setiawan (born 17 December 1982), also known as Tutus, is an Indonesian former footballer who plays as a full back. He is 172 cm tall. He plays as a full back.

== Career ==
The 2005 season, when Persijatim moved homebase from Surakarta to Palembang, Modestus Setyawan with Maman Abdurrahman and Akyar Ilyas became the main target of coach Bambang Nurdiansyah who at that time trained PSIS Semarang. Tutut's decision (call Modestus Setiawan because with his home town club, PSIS Semarang, managed to finish in rank III in the 2005 season and runner-up in the 2006 season.

On 2 December 2015, he signed with Persak Kebumen.

== Controversy ==
Modestus was involved in a fistfight with Greg Nwokolo when they together defended PSIS Semarang in the 2006 season. As a result, Greg Nwokolo was fired. According to general explanation of the manager of PSIS Semarang at that time, Yoyok Sukawi, Greg dismissal among others because There are three mistakes that Greg did. First, disagree with Emanuel de Porras against PS Semen Padang. Second, make Maman Abdurrahman injury during practice in Cilegon. And lastly, he beat Tutus after the fight against Persijap Jepara.

== National team ==
He had played for Indonesia national under-23 football team in 2005 SEA Games.
