= Cyril Emile Tchana =

Cameroonian footballer

Cyril Tchana
Personal information
- Full name: Cyril Émile Tchana
- Date of birth: 25 June 1983 (age 43)
- Place of birth: Douala, Cameroon
- Height: 1.76 m (5 ft 9 1/2 in)
- Position: Midfielder

Senior career*
Years	Team	Apps	(Gls)
2009–2010	PSPS Pekanbaru	31	(4)
2010–2012	Persikabo Bogor	27	(2)
- * Club domestic league appearances and goals as of 26 May 2010

Cyril Émile Tchana (born June 25, 1983) is a Cameroonian former footballer who plays as a midfielder. He previously played for Persikabo Bogor.
