= Wahyu Gunawan =

Indonesian footballer

Personal information
- Full name: Wahyu Gunawan
- Date of birth: 10 November 1985 (age 40)
- Place of birth: Malang, East Java, Indonesia
- Height: 1.70 m (5 ft 7 in)
- Positions: Defender; midfielder

Youth career
- Arema Malang

Senior career*
Years	Team	Apps	(Gls)
2007	Persipro Probolinggo	21	(2)
2008−2010	Deltras Sidoarjo	8	(1)
2010−2011	Arema Indonesia	0	(0)
2011−2012	Deltras Sidoarjo	16	(0)
2013	PSS Sleman	19	(0)
2014	Deltras Sidoarjo	18	(0)
Total		82	(3)
- * Club domestic league appearances and goals

Wahyu Gunawan (born 10 November 1985) is an Indonesian former footballer who played as a defender and midfielder.

== Honours ==
Deltras Sidoarjo

- Liga Indonesia Premier Division runner up: 2009–10
