= Kim Kang-hyun =

South Korean footballer (born 1985)

Kim Kang-Hyun
Personal information
- Full name: Kim Kang-Hyun
- Date of birth: May 16, 1985 (age 41)
- Place of birth: South Korea
- Height: 1.77 m (5 ft 10 in)
- Position: Midfielder

Senior career*
Years	Team	Apps	(Gls)
2004–2005	Pohang Steelers	27	(1)
2009–2010	Incheon Korail	29	(6)
2010–2011	Persibo Bojonegoro	5	(0)
2011–2012	Persita Tangerang	8	(0)
2012–2013	Persiwa Wamena	29	(0)
- * Club domestic league appearances and goals as of 11 July 2012

Kim Kang Hyun (born May 16, 1985 in South Korea) is a South Korean former footballer who plays as a midfielder.
