= Jairon (footballer) =

Brazilian footballer

Personal information
- Full name: Jairon Feliciano Damásio
- Date of birth: 21 April 1981 (age 45)
- Place of birth: Ponte Nova, Brazil
- Height: 1.83 m (6 ft 0 in)
- Position: Forward

Youth career
- 1994: Cruz Sport Clube
- 1998: Valeriodoce
- 1999: Democrata
- 2000: Ipatinga Futebol Clube

Senior career*
Years	Team	Apps	(Gls)
2001	Atlético Três Corações		
2002	Nacional (SP)		
2003	Radium	-	(7)
2004	Guarani	-	(13)
2005	Paranoá		
2005	FK Radnički Niš	17	(4)
2006	FK Pobeda	12	(3)
2007–2008	Agrotikos Asteras	20	(9)
2008–2009	Persebaya Surabaya	30	(21)
2009–2010	Persema Malang	20	(8)
2010–2011	Perseman Manokwari	10	(4)
2012	Persibo Bojonegoro	18	(7)
2013–2015	Al-Nasr	32	(15)
- * Club domestic league appearances and goals

Jairon Feliciano Damásio, known simply as Jairon, (born 21 April 1981) is a Brazilian former professional footballer who played as a forward.

== Career ==
After playing many years in Brazil in some prominent clubs like Nacional (SP) or Guaraní, in 2005, Petkovic moved this player to Serbia and signed with the historic Serbian First League club Radnički Niš. Macedonian First League club FK Pobeda before moving, in 2007, to Greece to play in Agrotikos Asteras in Greek second level. After one season there, he has moved to Persebaya and play in the ISL club Persebaya Surabaya played in this club 11 Games scored 21 goals and made history in this club and bring Persebaya promoted to ISL. He also played with Persema Malang before moving to Perseman Manokwari in 2011, season 2012 jairon moving to Persibo Bojonegoro and there he was champion of the Indonesian Cup, after great season he moved to Al Nasr in Oman.

== Honours ==
Pobeda Prilep

- Macedonian First League: 2006–07

Persibo Bojonegoro

- Piala Indonesia: 2012
