= Susanto (footballer) =

Indonesian footballer

Personal information
- Date of birth: 21 August 1987 (age 39)
- Place of birth: Pekanbaru, Indonesia
- Height: 1.78 m (5 ft 10 in)
- Position: Goalkeeper

Senior career*
| Years | Team | Apps | (Gls) |
| 2011–2016 | PSPS Riau | 48 | (0) |
- * Club domestic league appearances and goals as of 11 July 2012

Susanto (born August 21, 1987) is an Indonesian former footballer who plays as a goalkeeper.

== Club statistics ==
| Club | Season | Super League | | Premier Division | | Piala Indonesia | | Total | |
| Club | Season | Apps | Goals | Apps | Goals | Apps | Goals | Apps | Goals |
|---|---|---|---|---|---|---|---|---|---|
| PSPS Pekanbaru | 2011-12 | 1 | 0 | - | | - | | 1 | 0 |
| Total | | 1 | 0 | - | | - | | 1 | 0 |
