= Muhammad Albicho =

Syrian footballer (born 1985)

Muhammad Albicho محمد البشو
Personal information
- Date of birth: 7 March 1985 (age 41)
- Place of birth: Al Qamishli, Syria
- Height: 1.83 m (6 ft 0 in)
- Position: Striker

Senior career*
Years	Team	Apps	(Gls)
2005–2008	Al-Jehad	43	(25)
2008–2009	Al-Futowa Deir ez-Zor	31	(12)
2009–2010	Al-Wahda Damascus	24	(8)
2010–2011	Persiba Balikpapan	26	(5)
2011–2012	Persibo Bojonegoro	14	(4)
2012−2014	Al-Jehad	35	(13)
2014–2015	Misfat Baniyas	23	(7)
- * Club domestic league appearances and goals as of 13 April 2011

Muhammad Albicho (Arabic: محمد البشو, born 7 March 1985) is a Syrian former footballer who plays as a striker.
