= Victor da Silva (footballer, born 1976) =

Brazilian footballer

Personal information
- Full name: Victor Rodrigues da Silva
- Date of birth: 10 February 1976 (age 50)
- Place of birth: Rio de Janeiro, Brazil
- Height: 1.92 m (6 ft 4 in)
- Positions: Midfielder; defender

Senior career*
Years	Team	Apps	(Gls)
2002–2003	Anyang LG Cheetahs	13	(1)
2003–2008	Esporte Clube Mamore	38	(4)
2008–2010	Persibo Bojonegoro	49	(5)
2010–2013	PSIR Rembang	37	(2)
2013–2014	Perseba Super	20	(1)
2014–2015	Persisko Merangin	11	(0)
Total		160	(13)
- * Club domestic league appearances and goals

Victor Rodrigues da Silva or Victor da Silva (born 10 February 1976) is a Brazilian former footballer who played as defensive midfielder or defender.

== Club career ==
He played for FC Seoul of the South Korean K League, then known as Anyang LG Cheetahs.

== Honours ==
Persibo Bojonegoro

- Liga Indonesia Premier Division: 2009–10

Individual

- Liga Indonesia Premier Division Best Player: 2009–10
