= Amos Marah =

Ghanaian-born Liberian footballer

Personal information
- Full name: Amos Marah Kicmett
- Date of birth: January 1, 1984 (age 42)
- Place of birth: Buduburam, Ghana
- Height: 1.80 m (5 ft 11 in)
- Position: Striker

Youth career
- 1997–1999: Buduburam FC

Senior career*
Years	Team	Apps	(Gls)
2005	Persibo Bojonegoro	26	
2006	Gresik United	23	(1)
2007	PSS Sleman	6	(0)
2007	Persid Jember	9	
2008	PSSB Bireuen	12	(3)
2008–2009	Persikab Bandung	14	(7)
2009–2010	Persiraja Banda Aceh	19	(2)
2011–2012	Deltras	13	(2)
2013–2015	Persika Karawang	37	(10)

International career
2003	Liberia	1	(0)
- * Club domestic league appearances and goals as of 13:38, 22 March 2012 (UTC)

Amos Marah Kicmett (born January 1, 1984) is a Liberian former professional footballer.
