= Antônio Cláudio =

Brazilian footballer (born 1973)

Personal information
- Full name: Antônio Cláudio de Jesus Oliveira
- Date of birth: 16 April 1973 (age 53)
- Place of birth: Brazil
- Height: 1.80 m (5 ft 11 in)
- Position: Defender

Team information
- Current team: PSBS Biak (Assistant Coach)

Senior career*
| Years | Team | Apps | (Gls) |
| 1994−1995 | Semen Padang | | |
| 1995−1997 | PSP Padang | | |
| 2001−2004 | Persija Jakarta | | |
| 2005 | Semen Padang | | |
| 2006 | Persija Jakarta | | |
| 2007 | Persib Bandung | 28 | (4) |
| 2007−2009 | Persibom Bolmong | | |
| 2009−2010 | Semen Padang | | |
| 2010−2011 | Persih Tembilahan | 14 | (2) |
| 2011−2013 | Chiangrai United | 10 | (0) |
| 2014 | Villa 2000 | | |

Managerial career
- 2018–2019: Persija Jakarta (assistant)
- 2020: Borneo (assistant)
- 2021–2023: Bali United (assistant)
- 2024–2025: Persik Kediri (translator)
- 2025: PSBS Biak (assistant)
- 2025: Persijap Jepara (assistant)
- 2026–: PSBS Biak (assistant)
- * Club domestic league appearances and goals

Antônio Cláudio de Jesus Oliveira (born 16 April 1973), known as just Antônio Cláudio, is an Indonesian-Brazilian professional football manager and former player who is currently the assistant coach of Indonesian Super League club PSBS Biak.

== Honours ==
Persija Jakarta

- Liga Indonesia Premier Division: 2001
