= Lexe =

Brazilian footballer

Personal information
- Full name: Anderson Alexandro Ferreira dos Santos
- Date of birth: 30 August 1978 (age 48)
- Place of birth: Brazil
- Height: 1.82 m (5 ft 11 1/2 in)
- Position: Defender

Senior career*
Years	Team	Apps	(Gls)
2007–2008	PSMS Medan	15	(0)
2008–2010	PSIS Semarang	42	(0)
2010–2011	PSSB Bireuen	22	(1)
2011–2012	Gresik United	24	(0)
2012	Persibo Bojonegoro	26	(0)
- * Club domestic league appearances and goals

Anderson Alexandro Ferreira dos Santos (born 30 August 1978), better known as Lexe, is a Brazilian former footballer.

== Honours ==
Persibo Bojonegoro

- Piala Indonesia: 2012
