= George Oyedepo =

Nigerian footballer

Personal information
- Full name: George Oyebode Oyedepo
- Date of birth: 20 September 1985 (age 41)
- Place of birth: Lagos, Nigeria
- Height: 1.91 m (6 ft 3 in)
- Position: Defender

Senior career*
Years	Team	Apps	(Gls)
2005–2008	PSS Sleman	52	(3)
2008–2010	Perseman Manokwari	38	(2)
2010–2012	Persepar Palangkaraya	42	(5)
2012–2014	Kalteng Putra F.C.	32	(2)
2014–2015	Persiba Bantul	28	(3)
2015–2016	PSGC Ciamis	15	(1)
Total		207	(16)
- * Club domestic league appearances and goals

George Oyebode Oyedepo (born 20 September 1985) is a Nigerian former footballer who plays as a forward.

== Career ==
He played for PSS Sleman and Kalteng Putra before joining Persiba Bantul.
