= PS Mojokerto Putra =

Indonesian football club

- Full name: Persatuan Sepakbola Mojokerto Putra
- Nicknames: Laskar Majapahit (Majapahit Warriors)
- Short name: PSMP
- Founded: 21 March 2001; 25 years ago
- Ground: Gajahmada Mojosari Stadium; Mojokerto; East Java
- Capacity: 10,000
- Owner: Patriots Group
- President: Raja Siahaan
- Coach: Ridwan Oesman
- League: Liga 4
- 2024–25: 3rd (East Java zone); Third round, 3rd in Group A (National phase)
| Home colours | Away colours |

Persatuan Sepakbola Mojokerto Putra, commonly known as PS Mojokerto Putra or simply known as PSMP, is a professional Indonesian football team based in Mojokerto, East Java. Their homeground is Gajah Mada Stadium, Mojokerto. They compete in the Liga 4.

Their most memorable achievement was when they won the Indonesian First Division in 2008.

== Season-by-season records ==
| Season | League | Tier | Tms. | Pos. | Piala Indonesia |
|---|---|---|---|---|---|
| 2004 | Second Division | 3 | 41 | 3 | – |
| 2005 | First Division | 2 | 27 | '5th, Group 2 | First round |
| 2006 | First Division | 2 | 36 | 4th, Group III | First round |
| 2007 | First Division | 2 | 40 | 6th, Group III | Qualifying round |
| 2008–09 | First Division | 3 | 48 | 1 | First round |
| 2009–10 | Premier Division | 2 | 33 | 4th, Second round | – |
| 2010–11 | Premier Division | 2 | 39 | 13th, Group 3 | Second group stage |
| 2011–12 | Premier Division | 2 | 22 | 11th, Group 2 | – |
| 2013 | Premier Division | 2 | 39 | 3rd, Second round | – |
| 2014 | Premier Division | 2 | 63 | 4th, Group 6 | – |
| 2015 | Premier Division | 2 | 55 | did not finish | – |
| 2016 | ISC B | 2 | 53 | 6th, Group 5 | – |
| 2017 | Liga 2 | 2 | 61 | 4th, Third round | – |
| 2018 | Liga 2 | 2 | 24 | 3rd, Second round | Round of 32 |
| 2019 | Liga 2 | 2 | 23 | Disqualified | Round of 32 |
| 2020 | | | | | |
2021–22
2022–23
| 2023–24 | Liga 3 | 3 | 80 | Eliminated in Provincial round | – |
| 2024–25 | Liga 4 | 4 | 64 | 3rd, Third round | – |

== Honours ==
- Liga Indonesia First Division
  - Champions (1): 2008–09
