= Pro Duta F.C. =

Indonesian football club

Pro Duta FC
- Full name: Pro Duta Football Club
- Nickname: Pegasus
- Founded: 1986; 40 years ago
- League: Liga 3
- 2017: Liga 2, Withdrew (Relegated)
- Website: www.produta.com
Home colours	Away colours

Pro Duta Football Club is an Indonesian professional football club based in Medan, North Sumatra. Recently, it won the Indonesian Premier League (IPL) Play-off 2013 and had several friendly matches in Europe and Thailand during the Dare to Dream Tour 2013. The club is focused on youth development program. Their junior team (Pro Duta FC U-19) participated in the Trofeo Karol Wojtyla in Rome, Italy, December 2013.

== History ==
The origin of Pro Duta FC (PDFC) in its development to become one of Indonesia's football clubs, can be traced back to one of several Persib Bandung internal amateur football clubs under the management of Maung Bandung. At the time, Pro Duta was still called "Bandung Putra". As part of the 1986 management improvement efforts, "Bandung Putra" was renamed as "Pro". A year afterwards, "Pro" won the internal Persib Division I competition. In 1987, "Pro" was again renamed "Pro Duta" in preparations to take part in the professional competition organized by PSSI. Since turning into a professional club, "Pro Duta" decided to sever its dependence on(Persib Bandung). The club then began its tour in the 3rd Amateur Division of Liga Indonesia, West Java Zone. In the 2008/2009 playing season, "Pro Duta" competed in the 1st Amateur Division, while in the subsequent year, the club was promoted into the Premier Division 2009/2010.

== Youth development ==
The development program is implemented through an integrated vertical structure that includes “Boca Juniors Football Schools Indonesia” in Jakarta (an international-standard school with license from Argentina), “Medan United” in Medan (competing in Amateur 2nd Division of PSSI), “Nusaina FC” in Ambon (competing in Amateur 1st Division of PSSI), PRO DUTA FC as the first experience to play in the professional league and to experience play at the National Competition level.
