= Semen Padang (company) =

Indonesian cement company

Padang Cement
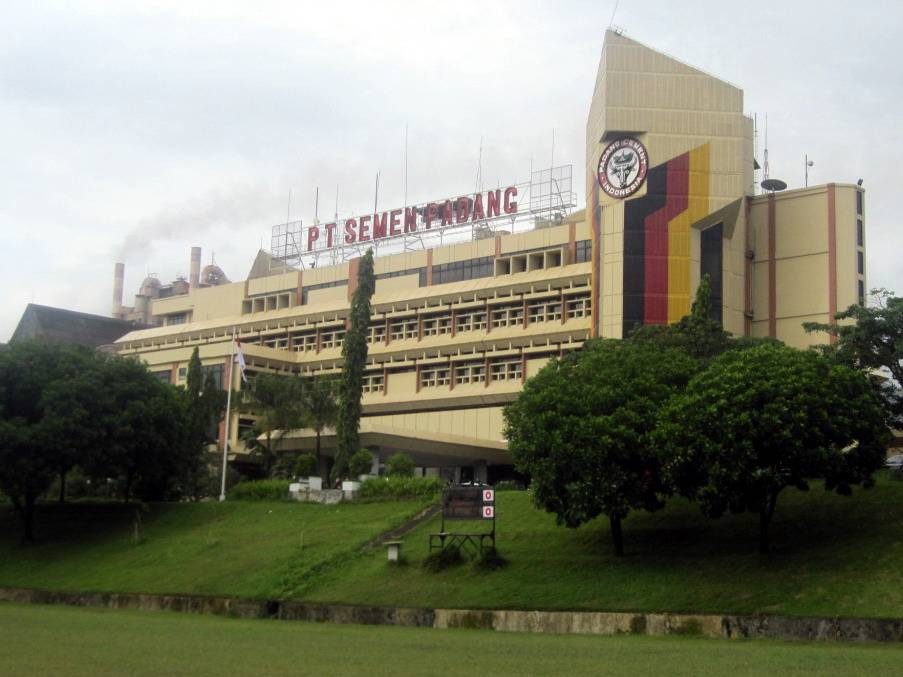
- Headquarters of Semen Padang in Indarung
- Native name: PT Semen Padang
- Formerly: NV Nederlandsch Indische Portland Cement Maatschappij
- Type: Company
- Industry: production
- Founded: 18 March 1910
- Founder: Carl Christophus Lau
- Headquarters: Padang, Indonesia
- Key people: Pri Gustari Akbar (President Director)
- Products: Cement
- Production output: 8,900,000 tons/year
- Parent: Semen Indonesia
- Website: www.semenpadang.co.id

PT Semen Padang is a subsidiary of SIG engaged in cement production. The company is the oldest cement manufacturer in Shoutheast Asia. To support its business activities, as of the end of 2020, the company operated five plants in Padang and one plant in dumai, with a total production capacity of 8.9 milion tons of cement per year

== History ==
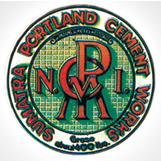
The first logo used by NV NIPCM

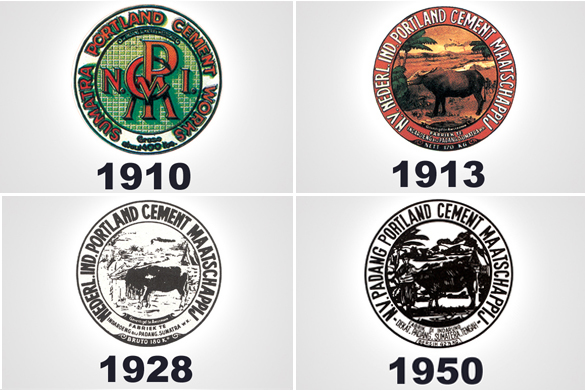
Semen Padang logos when it was first established until the last time it was controlled by the Dutch

The company traces its origins back to 1906, when a Dutch officer of German descent, Carl Christophus Lau, applied to the Dutch East Indies government for permission to establish a cement plant in Indarung Lau had previously discovered raw materials for cement production in the Indarung area. The application was approved about seven months later. Lau then partnered with several companies to establish the cement plant on 18 March 1910 under the name NV Nederlandsch Indische Portland Cement Maatschappij (NIPCM)

The company’s first kiln was completed in 1911 with a production capacity of 76.5 tons of cement per day. A second kiln with the same capacity was built the following year. By 1913, the company began operating the Indarung I Plant, with an annual production capacity of 22,900 tons of cement. In 1939, the plant’s capacity was increased to 170,000 tons per year.

During World War II, under the Japanese occupation of Indonesia, the company was managed by Asano Cement (now Taiheiyo Cement). Its output was used t support Japanese military needs. In August 1944, the plant was destroyed by Allied bombing. After Indonesia's independence, the company was renamed NV Padang Portland Cement Maatschappij (PPCM). In 1959, the Indonesian government nationalized the company, placing it under the management of the Industrial and Mining Enterprise Administration Agency (BAPPIT). In 1961, the company was converted into a state-owned enterprise (PN) under the name PN Semen Padang. In the late 1960s, political turmoil caused by the PRRI movement disrupted company operations, nearly leading to the closure and dismantling of the factory. However, West Sumatra Governor Harun Zain intervened and appointed Ir. Azwar Anas to lead the company. Under his leadership, Semen Padang was revitalized and survived.In 1971, the government converted the company into a persero (state-owned limited liability company), and the production capacity of Indarung I was raised to 300,000 tons per year.

Over the following decades, the company expanded its production facilities: the Indarung II Plant began operations in 1979 with a capacity of 600,000 tons per year; the Indarung IIIA and IIIB Plants were launched in 1984 and 1986, each with the same capacity; and between 1990 and 1993, the Indarung IIIB Plant’s capacity was upgraded to 1.62 million tons per year. In 1995, Semen Padang officially became a subsidiary of Semen Gresik. The Indarung V Plant began operations in 1998 with a capacity of 2.3 million tons per year, and the following year, the Indarung I Plant was decommissioned

Between 2003 and 2011, the company optimized its facilities, increasing its total production capacity to 6.5 million tons/year. In 2012, Semen Padang began constructing a cement plant in Dumai (capacity: 900,000 tons/year). In 2017, it inaugurated the Indarung VI Plant with a capacity of 1.5 million tons/year

== Production ==
In 2019, PT Semen Padang produced 6.5 million tons of cement and 5.72 million tons of clinker, with detailed output since 2016 as follows:

=== Plant Capacity ===
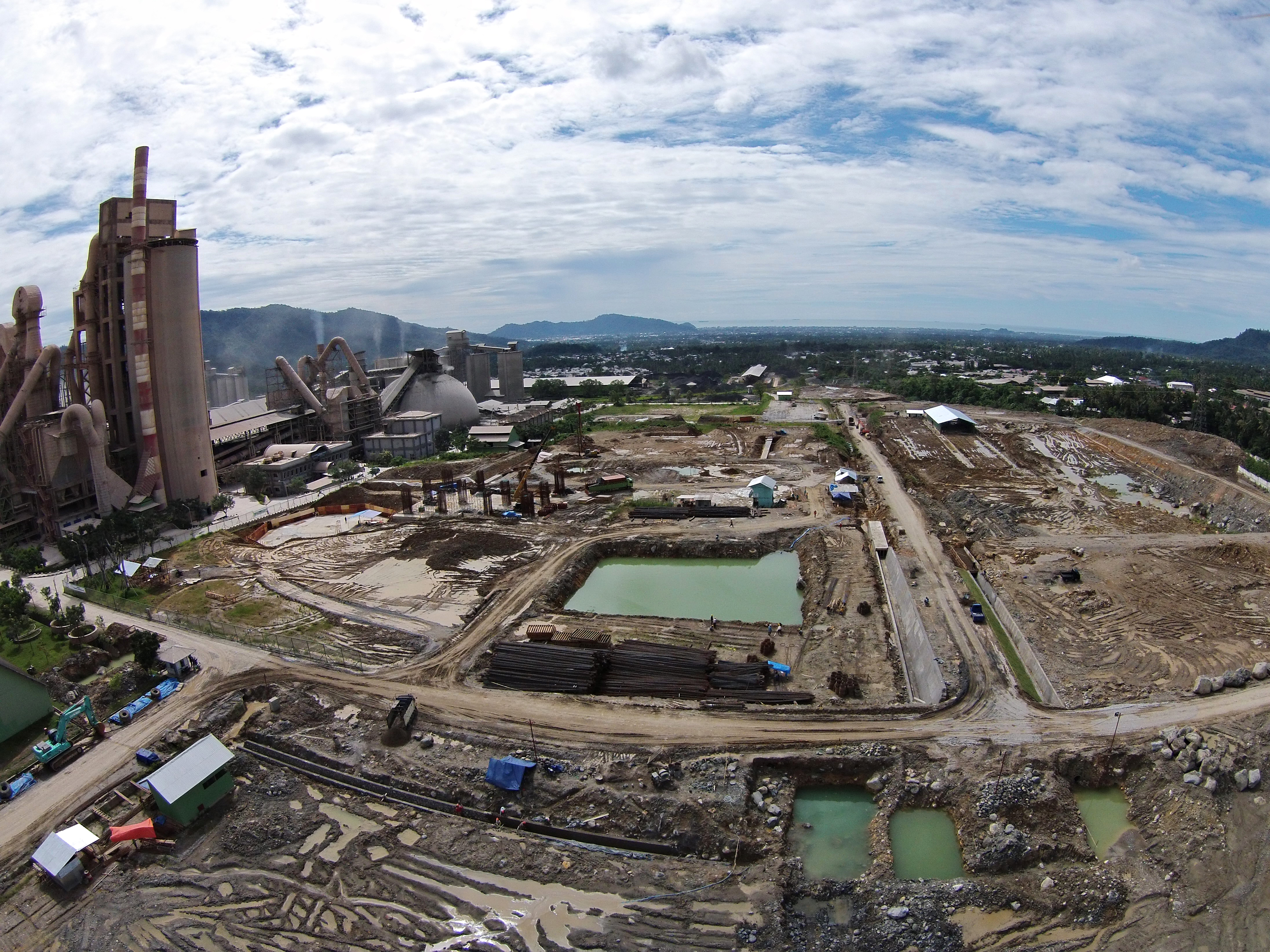
One of Indarung factories

The company’s total production capacity is 8.9 million tons/year, distributed as:

- Indarung II Plant – 860,000 tons / year
- Indarung III Plant – 720,000 tons / year
- Indarung IV Plant – 1,920,000 tons / year
- Indarung V Plant – 2,500,000 tons / year
- Indarung VI Plant – 2,500,000 tons / year
- Dumai Cement Mill – 900,000 tons / year

Indarung I was shut down in October 1999 due to efficiency and environmental concerns, as it still employed the wet-process method since its establishment in 1910.

=== Raw Materials ===
The main raw materials for cement production are limestone, silica stone, clay, and iron sand.

- Limestone (81%) is sourced from Karang Putih hill (2 km from the plant).
- Silica stone (9%) comes from Ngalau hill (1.5 km from the plant).
- Clay (9%) is obtained from Kuranji District, Padang.
- Iron sand (1%) is supplied from Cilacap.

At the final grinding stage, gypsum (3–5%) is added, imported from Thailand as well as supplied by PT Petrokimia Gresik (natural and synthetic gypsum).

=== Production Process ===
The cement production process consists of five stages:

1. Mining and storage of raw materials
2. Grinding and mixing of raw materials
3. Homogenization of raw meal
4. Burning in the kiln
5. Final grinding

In the dry process, raw materials are ground in the Raw Mill with hot air from the rotary kiln, producing raw mix with <1% moisture content. After homogenization, the raw mix is burned in the kiln using coal fuel, producing black nodules called clinker.

The clinker is then ground in the Cement Mill, combined with gypsum in specific proportions, resulting in cement ready for market distribution (both bagged and bulk).

=== Product Portfolio ===
- Portland Cement Type I – For general construction without special requirements.
- Portland Cement Type II – For mass concrete with moderate heat of hydration and sulfate resistance.
- Portland Cement Type III – For constructions needing early high compressive strength.
- Portland Cement Type V – For environments with high sulfate content (e.g., wastewater plants, bridges, harbors).
- Super Masonry Cement – For housing, small infrastructure, and building materials (tiles, hollow bricks, paving blocks).
- Oil Well Cement (OWC), Class G-HSR – Special cement for offshore and onshore oil and gas wells.
- Portland Composite Cement (PCC) – Conforming to SNI 15-7064-2004, suitable for general construction and precast concrete.
- Portland Pozzolan Cement (PPC) – Conforming to SNI 15-0302-2004 and ASTM C595, ideal for dams, coastal structures, and sulfate-resistant concrete.

=== Sports Sponsorship ===
On 30 November 1980, PT Semen Padang founded PS Semen Padang, which later became the professional football club Semen Padang FC. The club is still owned by PT Semen Padang today.
