= Persibo Bojonegoro =

Indonesian football club

- Full name: Persatuan Sepakbola Indonesia Bojonegoro
- Nicknames: Laskar Angling Dharma (Angling Dharma Army); Naga Bergola (The Bergola Dragon); Pembunuh Raksasa (The Giant Killer)
- Short name: PSBO; BJO
- Founded: 12 March 1949; 77 years ago
- Ground: Letjen Haji Sudirman Stadium
- Capacity: 10.000
- Owner: PT. Semangat Bojonegoro Jaya
- CEO: Eko Setyawan
- Coach: Iwan Setiawan
- League: Liga Nusantara
- 2025–26: Liga Nusantara/Regular Round (Group C), 3rd
- Website: persibo.com
Home colours	Away colours

Persatuan Sepakbola Indonesia Bojonegoro (English: Indonesian Football Association of Bojonegoro) commonly known and abbreviated as Persibo, is an Indonesian professional football club in Bojonegoro, East Java. They compete in the Liga Nusantara, the third tier of Indonesian football, after relegated from the Championship in 2025 through a relegation playoff match against Persipura. In 2010, Persibo played in the Indonesia Super League (the top tier of Indonesian football) after winning Divisi Utama the previous season. In 2012, Persibo won Piala Indonesia after defeating Semen Padang in the final and represented Indonesia in 2013 AFC Cup.

== History ==
The club was established on 12 March 1949, on the initiative of Raden Tumenggung Sukardi who served as Regent of Bojonegoro at that time. Once inactive in the 1960s, the team starting to compete once again in the Indonesian footballing pyramid during the new millennium in 2000, where the team's best achievement was crowned as champions of Divisi Dua Liga Indonesia in the 2003–04 season and promoted to Divisi Satu Liga Indonesia. After only two seasons in the league, in the 2007–08 season, the club once again emerged as Divisi Satu Liga Indonesia champions and earned promotion, this time to the Divisi Utama.

In their first season in the second tier of Indonesian football, the team nicknamed Laskar Angling Dharma made a big surprise in the Copa Indonesia tournament, after they caused some upsets by defeating three teams from Indonesia's top-flight, namely Arema Indonesia, Persik Kediri, and Pelita Jaya to advance to the last eight of the prestigious tournament which brought together teams across three divisions. At the same time, the national football public was shocked and began to reckon with them, in doing so dubbed the team as The Giant Killer.

Persibo managed to win 2009-10 Liga Joss Indonesia after defeating Deltras FC in the final match, thus successfully qualifying for the 2011 Indonesian Super League with Deltras FC as runner-up and Semen Padang FC who won third place. After playing several matches at Indonesia Super League, precisely at the end of December 2010 Persibo decided to jump the ship and join the Indonesian Premier League which at that time was a breakaway league thus the club was sanctioned which meant that Persibo Bojonegoro was banned from participating in any PSSI activities and had to be thrown into Divisi Satu Liga Indonesia the following season. However, Persibo's membership status was restored along with Persema Malang, Persebaya Surabaya and PSM Makassar by the PSSI Executive Committee (Exco) in the third Exco meeting on Monday, 15 August 2011 at the PSSI Senayan Office Jakarta.

The lifting of these sanctions gave a way for Persibo to take part in the assistance of the PSSI professional league for the 2011–12 season and compete with clubs from Indonesian Super League and Divisi Satu Liga Indonesia to professionalize. From the results of this assistance, Persibo was registered as one of the 24 clubs entitled to compete at level 1 of the Indonesian pro league which was later named Indonesian Premier League or Liga Prima Indonesia. In the 2011–12 season, Persibo was among 13 teams taking part in the Indonesian Premier League, which at the time is the highest tier in Indonesian football.

In 2012, Persibo became the champions of Piala Indonesia after defeating Semen Padang FC in the final. That result gave them the right to take part in the next season AFC Cup. Unfortunately the following season, the club would become a mere punching bag in the group containing the likes of Sun Hei SC of Hong Kong, New Radiant SC of Maldives, Yangon United FC of Myanmar; collecting just a single point from 5 matches and allowing 39 goals in the process. On top of that, the club were in the middle of a severe financial crisis which ultimately led to their eventual demise and relegation to the lowest tier of Indonesian football at the time, Liga Nusantara.

For several years after relegation to Liga Nusantara (which would later rebranded as Liga 3), the club was simply inactive due to several things, partly for financial reason and being banned by PSSI for breaking away from the official competition during the 2011 schism in the federation (commonly referred to as Dualisme, Dualism). Their membership status was finally restored in PSSI Extraordinary Congress 2017, which granted them a spot to compete in the Regional phase of 2017–18 Liga 3 East Java Region.

In 2023–24, after several years in the third tier, Persibo secured promotion to Liga 2 for the first time in more than a decade after finishing as one of the top 3 teams in their National phase Liga 3 group. They progressed as far as the National phase final, where they were beaten by Adhyaksa Farmel.

Unfortunately, Persibo Bojonegoro was only able to survive one season in Liga 2. They were relegated back to Liga Nusantara (3rd tier of Indonesian football) after losing 2–1 against Persipura Jayapura in the relegation playoff.

== Staff & coaching ==
Position	Name
Team Manager	(Indonesia) Jeffri Jehosua
Head coach	(Indonesia) Iwan Setiawan
Assistant coach	(Indonesia) Agus Supriyanto
Assistant coach	(Indonesia) Aries Tuansyah
Goalkeeper coach	(Indonesia) Gary Anggrana
Physical coach	(Indonesia) Prabowo Sucipto

== Manager history ==
- (Indonesia) Jamrawi (2001–2003)
- (Indonesia) Sanusi Rahman (2003–2006)
- (Indonesia) Hanafi (2006)
- (Indonesia) Gusnul Yakin (2006–2008)
- (Indonesia) Sartono Anwar (2008–2010)
- (Brazil) Paulo Camargo (2011–2012)
- (Indonesia) Gusnul Yakin (2013)
- (Indonesia) Bambang Pramudji (2014–2017)
- (Indonesia) I Putu Gede (2017)
- (Indonesia) Jordi Kartiko (2018)
- (Indonesia) Muhammad Nadhief (2019–2020)
- (Indonesia) Muhammad Fahrudin (2021)
- (Indonesia) Masdra Nurriza (2022)
- (Indonesia) Adnan Mahing (2023)
- (Indonesia) Iwan Setiawan (2023–2024)
- (Indonesia) I Putu Gede (2024)
- (Indonesia) Regi Aditya (2024)
- (Indonesia) Kahudi Wahyu (2024–2025)
- (Indonesia) Iwan Setiawan (2025–now)

== Players ==
=== Current squad ===
As of 25 July 2026

Note: Flags indicate national team as defined under FIFA eligibility rules; some limited exceptions apply. Players may hold more than one non-FIFA nationality.

No.	Pos.	Nation	Player
1	GK	IDN	Nur Ikhsan
2	DF	IDN	Rizky Dwi Nugraha
3	DF	IDN	Joko Supriyanto
5	DF	IDN	Romy Setiawan
6	DF	IDN	Tegar Shevanton
7	FW	IDN	Revan Nurianto
8	MF	IDN	Ilham Maulana
9	FW	IDN	Samsul Arif (captain)
12	MF	IDN	Rangga Dwi Lesmana
14	MF	IDN	Fadil Sausu
15	MF	IDN	Ananda Bagus
17	FW	IDN	Jhon Wutoy
19	MF	IDN	Gilang Pratama
20	FW	IDN	Azka Fauzi

No.	Pos.	Nation	Player
21	FW	IDN	Zegga Novembrian
22	DF	IDN	Jovan Maulana
23	MF	IDN	Fajar Ikhsanudin
26	DF	IDN	Rio Valentino
27	GK	IDN	Fiqy Febrian
28	DF	IDN	Fransiskus Nono
29	DF	IDN	Yonas Rejauw
30	DF	IDN	Fahmi Arma
33	DF	IDN	Yoga Prasetya
77	FW	IDN	Tirta Bayu
78	MF	IDN	Rahel Radiansyah
83	GK	IDN	Febryansyah Sanusi
88	GK	IDN	Adre Arido
92	MF	IDN	Bayu Nugroho
99	MF	IDN	Oscar Novangga

== Former foreign players ==
=== AFC ===
- (Australia) Adam Harrys
- (Australia) Kim Harrys
- (China) Li Zhixing
- (Timor-Leste) Adelino Oliveira
- (Iran) Amir Amadeh
- (Iran) Taher Jahanbakhsh
- (Malaysia) Stanley Bernard
- (South Korea) Kim Kang-hyun
- (South Korea) Han Ji-ho
- (Syria) Muhammad Albicho
- (Turkmenistan) Mekan Nasyrow

=== CONMEBOL ===
- (Argentina) Gustavo Ortiz
- (Argentina) Julio Alcorsé
- (Argentina) Marcelo Cirelli
- (Brazil) Carlos Eduardo
- (Brazil) Jairon Feliciano
- (Brazil) Lexe
- (Brazil) Victor da Silva
- (Brazil) Wallacer

=== CAF ===
- (Ivory Coast) Eugène Dadi
- (Liberia) Amos Marah
- (Liberia) Abel Cielo Quioh
- (Liberia) Alexander Robinson
- (Liberia) Joseph Amoah
- (Liberia) Morris Bayour Power
- (Liberia) Perry Kollie
- (Liberia) Varney Pas Boakay

=== UEFA ===
- (France) Enzo Célestine
- (Portugal) Vítor Barata

== Season-by-season records ==
Season	League/Division	Tms.	Pos.	Piala Indonesia	AFC competition(s)
2002	Second Division	24	3	–	–
2003	First Division	26	5th, Group B	–	–
2004	Second Division	41	1	–	–
2005	First Division	30	3rd, Second round	First round	–
2006	First Division	36	6th, Group 3	Second round	–
2007	First Division	40	1	Second round	–
2008–09	Premier Division	29	6th, Group 2	Quarter-final	–
2009–10	Premier Division	33	1	Second round	–
2010–11	Liga Primer Indonesia	18	8	–	–
2011–12	Indonesian Premier League	12	4	Champions	–
2013	Indonesian Premier League	16	Disqualified	–	Group stage
2014					
2015
2016
2017	Liga 3	32	Quarter-final	–	–
2018	Liga 3	32	Eliminated in Provincial round	First round	–
2019	Liga 3	32	Eliminated in Provincial round	First round	–
2020	Liga 3	season abandoned		–	–
2021–22	Liga 3	64	Eliminated in Provincial round	–	–
2022–23	Liga 3	season abandoned		–	–
2023–24	Liga 3	80	2	–	–
2024–25	Liga 2	26	Relegation play-of loser	–	–
2025–26	Liga Nusantara	24	3rd, Group C	–	–
2026–27	Liga Nusantara	24	TBD	–	–

== Performance in AFC competitions ==
Season	Competition	Round	Nat	Club	Home	Away
2013	AFC Cup	Group stage	(Myanmar)	Yangon United	1–7	0–3
2013	AFC Cup	Group stage	(Maldives)	New Radiant	0–7	1–6
2013	AFC Cup	Group stage	(Hong Kong)	Sunray Cave JC Sun Hei	3–3	0–8

== Honours ==
=== Domestic ===
League

- Liga Indonesia Premier Division
  - Winners (1): 2009–10
- Liga Indonesia First Division
  - Winners (1): 2007
- Liga Indonesia Second Division
  - Winners: 2004
- Liga 3
  - Runners-up: 2023–24
- Liga 3 East Java
  - Winners: 2023–24

Cups

- Piala Indonesia
  - Winners: 2012
- Community Shield
  - Runners-up: 2013

=== AFC (Asian competitions) ===
- AFC Cup
  - 2013 – Group stage
