= 2010–11 Persiraja Banda Aceh season =

Persiraja Banda Aceh
- Full name: Persatuan Sepakbola Indonesia Kutaraja Banda Aceh
- Nicknames: Rencong Army, The Kutaraja Tiger
- Founded: 28 July 1957 (55 years ago)
- Ground: H. Dimurthala Stadium; Banda Aceh, Indonesia
- Capacity: 20,000
- Owner: Municipality of Banda Aceh
- CEO: Mawardy Nurdin (Mayor of Banda Aceh)
- Manager: (Indonesia) Adly Tjalok
- Coach: (Indonesia) Herry Kiswanto
- League: Liga Indonesia Premier Division
- 2010–11 LIPD: 2nd
Home colours	Away colours

The 2010–11 Liga Indonesia Premier Division is Persiraja Banda Aceh's fourth season since the inception of Liga Indonesia Premier Division.

== Players ==
unknown

== Transfer ==
unknown

== Competitions ==
=== Liga Indonesia Premier Division ===
==== Results summary ====
Overall								Home						Away					
Pld	W	D	L	GF	GA	GD	Pts	W	D	L	GF	GA	GD	W	D	L	GF	GA	GD
24	15	3	6	43	25	+18	48	10	2	0	27	6	+21	5	1	6	16	19	−3

==== Table ====
Group 1
Pos	Team	Pld	W	D	L	GF	GA	GD	Pts	Qualification
1	Persiraja Banda Aceh	24	15	3	6	43	25	+18	48	Advanced to the 2010–11 Liga Indonesia Premier Division Second Round
2	PSAP Sigli	24	15	2	7	53	20	+33	47	Advanced to the 2010–11 Liga Indonesia Premier Division Second Round
3	PSMS Medan	24	14	3	7	36	25	+11	45	Advanced to the 2010–11 Liga Indonesia Premier Division Second Round
4	Persita Tangerang	24	12	7	5	42	18	+24	43	
5	Persipasi Bekasi	24	13	4	7	38	21	+17	43	

==== Fixtures and results ====
===== First round =====
19 November 2010 Matchday 1	PS Bengkulu	1–2	Persiraja Banda Aceh	Semarak Stadium, Bengkulu
15.15 WIB	Bako 79'		Mukhlis 47'; Musawir 86'	Attendance: 5,000; Referee: Suprapto (Indonesia)

28 November 2010 Matchday 2	Persiraja Banda Aceh	3–0	PSMS Medan	H. Dimurthala Stadium, Banda Aceh
16.00 WIB	Bekatal 56', 80'; Djibril 42'			Attendance: 9,993; Referee: Tardianis (Indonesia)

2 December 2010 Matchday 3	Persiraja Banda Aceh	2–1	Pro Titan FC	H. Dimurthala Stadium, Banda Aceh
16.10 WIB	Djibril 17'; Musawir 75'		Suyatno 90'	Attendance: 8,321; Referee: Novari Ikhsan Arilaha (Indonesia)

16 December 2010 Matchday 4	Persih Tembilahan	1–2	Persiraja Banda Aceh	Beringin Stadium, Tembilahan
15.45 WIB	Adrian 25'		Djibril 5'; Fahrizal 73'	Attendance: 3,200; Referee: Puji Suprayitno (Indonesia)

20 December 2010 Matchday 5	Persires Rengat	1–3	Persiraja Banda Aceh	Narasinga Stadium, Rengat
15.30 WIB	Nanang 73'		Bekatal 24', 82'; Andria 45+1'	Attendance: 100; Referee: Suprapto (Indonesia)

3 January 2011 Matchday 6	Persiraja Banda Aceh	1–0	Persipasi Bekasi	H. Dimurthala Stadium, Banda Aceh
16.15 WIB	Bekatal 36'			Attendance: 6,539; Referee: Tardianis (Indonesia)

7 January 2011 Matchday 7	Persiraja Banda Aceh	1–1	Persita Tangerang	H. Dimurthala Stadium, Banda Aceh
16.15 WIB	Fahrizal 81'		Maman 20'	Attendance: 8,503; Referee: Ferdinand Duha (Indonesia)

12 January 2011 Matchday 8	Persitara Jakarta Utara	2–3	Persiraja Banda Aceh	Tugu Stadium, Jakarta Utara
15.00 WIB	Harri 33'; Brima Pepito 56'		Musawir 41'; Erik 44'; Djibril 87'	Attendance: 2,527; Referee: Isham (Indonesia)

17 January 2011 Matchday 9	Persikabo Bogor	4–3	Persiraja Banda Aceh	Persikabo Stadium, Cibinong
15.15 WIB	Salim 23', 64'; Cyril 52'; Jibby 87'		Fahrizal 40'; Musawir 69'; Erik 74'	Attendance: 4,756; Referee: Hadi Suroso (Indonesia)

21 January 2011 Matchday 10	Persiraja Banda Aceh	1–1	PSAP Sigli	H. Dimurthala Stadium, Banda Aceh
16.15 WIB	Musawir 62'		Osas Saha 8'	Attendance: 10,479; Referee: Suprapto (Indonesia)

1 February 2011 Matchday 11	Persiraja Banda Aceh	1–0	PSSB Bireun	H. Dimurthala Stadium, Banda Aceh
16.15 WIB	Musawir 21'			Attendance: 6,793; Referee: Suprapto (Indonesia)

5 February 2011 Matchday 12	Persiraja Banda Aceh	1–0	PSLS Lhokseumawe	H. Dimurthala Stadium, Banda Aceh
16.15 WIB	Fahrizal 1'			Attendance: 5,967; Referee: Suprapto (Indonesia)

26 February 2011 Matchday 13	PSSB Bireun	0–2	Persiraja Banda Aceh	Cot Gapu Stadium, Bireuen
15.15 WIB			Bekatal 47', 59'	Attendance: 1,212; Referee: Tardianis (Indonesia)

2 March 2011 Matchday 14	PSLS Lhokseumawe	3–0	Persiraja Banda Aceh	Tunas Bangsa Stadium, Lhokseumawe
16.15 WIB	Raul 56', 66'; Iqbal 9'			Attendance: 5,713; Referee: Bachtiar A. (Indonesia)

6 March 2011 Matchday 15	PSAP Sigli	1–0	Persiraja Banda Aceh	Kuta Asan Stadium, Sigli
16.15 WIB	Reza 10'			Attendance: 7,212; Referee: Dodi Setia Purnama (Indonesia)

13 March 2011 Matchday 16	Persiraja Banda Aceh	5–1	Persitara Jakarta Utara	H. Dimurthala Stadium, Banda Aceh
16.15 WIB	Fahrizal 82', 88'; Bekatal 28'; Djibril 41'; Musawir 48'		Evrad 43'	Attendance: 8,152; Referee: Tardianis (Indonesia)

17 March 2011 Matchday 17	Persiraja Banda Aceh	2–0	Persikabo Bogor	H. Dimurthala Stadium, Banda Aceh
15.15 WIB	Hendra 62'; Fahrizal 68'			Attendance: 7,509; Referee: Isham (Indonesia)

22 March 2011 Matchday 18	Persipasi Bekasi	1–0	Persiraja Banda Aceh	Patriot Stadium, Bekasi
15.15 WIB	Arie 71'			Attendance: 6,893; Referee: Prasetyo Hadi (Indonesia)

25 March 2011 Matchday 19	Persita Tangerang	3–1	Persiraja Banda Aceh	Benteng Stadium, Tangerang
15.15 WIB	Cristian 31', 66'; Fauzi 64'		Bekatal 36'	Attendance: 14,276; Referee: Iwan Sukoco (Indonesia)

29 March 2011 Matchday 20	Persiraja Banda Aceh	2–0	Persih Tembilahan	H. Dimurthala Stadium, Banda Aceh
16.15 WIB	Musawir 52', 88'			Attendance: 5,000; Referee: Suprapto (Indonesia)

2 April 2011 Matchday 21	Persiraja Banda Aceh	5–2	Persires Rengat	H. Dimurthala Stadium, Banda Aceh
16.15 WIB	Fahrizal 5', 60', 84'; Musawir 49'; Bekatal 72'		Burhanuddin 7'; Hermawan 21'	Attendance: 8,539; Referee: Heri Santoso (Indonesia)

12 April 2011 Matchday 22	PSMS Medan	2–0	Persiraja Banda Aceh	Teladan Stadium, Medan
19.00 WIB	Luis 50'; Gaston 76' (pen.)			Attendance: 15,121; Referee: Supratman (Indonesia)

18 April 2011 Matchday 23	Pro Titan FC	0–0	Persiraja Banda Aceh	Teladan Stadium, Medan
16.00 WIB				Attendance: 321; Referee: Dodi Setia Purnama (Indonesia)

25 April 2011 Matchday 24	Persiraja Banda Aceh	3–0	PS Bengkulu	H. Dimurthala Stadium, Banda Aceh
15.15 WIB	Nanda 28', 42'; Irwanto 66' (pen.)			Attendance: 8,053; Referee: Suprapto (Indonesia)

=== Group A ===
- 5 matches were played in Mandala Stadium, Jayapura, Papua.
- 1 match were played in Barnabas Youwe Stadium, Sentani, Jayapura Regency, Papua.
- All times are Eastern Indonesia Time (WIT) – UTC+09:00.

Pos	Team	Pld	W	D	L	GF	GA	GD	Pts	Qualification
1	Persidafon Dafonsoro	3	2	1	0	7	4	+3	7	Advanced to the Semifinals
2	Persiraja Banda Aceh	3	1	1	1	3	4	−1	4	Advanced to the Semifinals
3	Gresik United	3	1	0	2	6	7	−1	3	
4	Persiram Raja Ampat	3	1	0	2	5	6	−1	3	

Day 1

12 May 2011
21:00 WIT

Persiraja Banda Aceh	2–1	Gresik United
Djibril 18'; Bekatal 69'	Report; Live TV: antv	Herry 31'

Mandala Stadium, Jayapura, Papua
Attendance: 1,137
Referee: Najamuddin Aspiran (Indonesia)

Day 3

14 May 2011
21:00 WIT

Persiram Raja Ampat	2–0	Persiraja Banda Aceh
N. Solossa 50'; Tao 87' (pen.)	Report; Live TV: antv

Mandala Stadium, Jayapura, Papua
Attendance: 852
Referee: Suharto (Indonesia)

Day 6

17 May 2011
15:05 WIT

Persidafon Jayapura	1–1	Persiraja Banda Aceh
Rasmoyo 26'	Report; Live TV: antv	Qadar 33'

Mandala Stadium, Jayapura, Papua
Attendance: 1,763
Referee: Novari Ikhsan Arilaha (Indonesia)

==== Knockout phase ====
Semifinal

22 May 2011
19:00 WIB

Mitra Kukar	0–1	Persiraja Banda Aceh (P)
	Report	Fahrizal 31'

Manahan, Solo, Central Java
Attendance: 1,025
Referee: Djumadi Effendi (Indonesia)

Final

25 May 2011
19:00 WIB

Persiba Bantul	1–0	Persiraja Banda Aceh
Wahyu 45'	Report; Live TV: antv

Manahan Stadium, Solo, Central Java
Attendance: 34,898
Referee: Jimmy Napitupulu (Indonesia)
