= List of Indonesian football transfers 2011–12 =

This is a list of Indonesian football transfers in the summer and the winter transfer window 2011–12. Only transfers of the Indonesia Super League are included.

Updated Transfer window on April 30, 2012.

== First transfer window ==
=== Foreign Players ===
Team	Outgoing player	Manner of departure	Destination club	Incoming player	Previous club
Arema Indonesia	(Slovakia) Roman Golian	Released	Persela Lamongan	(Cameroon) Seme Pattrick	Persema Malang
Arema Indonesia	(Singapore) Noh Alam Shah	Released	Arema IPL	(Argentina) Rodrigo Santoni	PSIS Semarang
Arema Indonesia	(Uruguay) Esteban Guillén	Released	Arema IPL	(South Korea) Kim Yong-hee	Persiba Balikpapan
Arema Indonesia	(Singapore) Muhammad Ridhuan	Released	Arema IPL	(Australia) Steve Hesketh	Deltras Sidoarjo
Arema Indonesia	(Slovakia) Roman Chmelo	Released	Arema IPL	(Brazil) Marcio Souza	Deltras Sidoarjo
Deltras	(Brazil) Cristiano Lopes	Released	Sriracha	(Liberia) Amos Marah	Persiraja Banda Aceh
Deltras	(Brazil) Danilo Fernando	Released	Persija IPL	(Argentina) Walter Bruzuela	Pelita Jaya
Deltras	(Brazil) Marcio Souza	Released	Arema Indonesia	(Croatia) Mijo Dadic	Persiba Balikpapan
Deltras	(Australia) Steve Hesketh	Released	Arema Indonesia	(Australia) Sean Rooney	Newcastle Jets
Deltras	(South Korea) Park Chan Young	Released	Free agent	(South Korea) Shin Hyun-Joon	PSPS Pekanbaru
Gresik United	(Paraguay) Jorge Bareiro	Released	Free agent	(Argentina) Gaston Castano	PSMS Medan
Gresik United	(Chile) Luis Peña	Released	PSMS Medan	(Argentina) Gustavo Chena	PSIS Semarang
Gresik United	(Brazil) Anderson dos Santos	Released	Persibo Bojonegoro	(Liberia) James Koko	LISCR FC
Gresik United	(Brazil) Anderson dos Santos	Released	Persibo Bojonegoro	(Syria) Marwan Sayedeh	PSM Makassar
Mitra Kukar	(Brazil) Anderson Da Silva	Released	Persik Kediri	(Japan) Seiji Kaneko	Tampines Rovers
Mitra Kukar	(Argentina) Franco Hitta	Released	Chiangrai United	(England) Marcus Bent	Birmingham City
Mitra Kukar	(Cameroon) Mbom Julian	Released	Free agent	(Cameroon) Pierre Njanka	Atjeh United
Mitra Kukar	(Cameroon) Mbom Julian	Released	Free agent	(Serbia) Nemanja Obrić	Al Hazm
Mitra Kukar	(Cameroon) Mbom Julian	Released	Free agent	(South Korea) Lee Sang-Min	Rio Branco
Pelita Jaya	(Paraguay) Juan Ramirez	Released	Free agent	(North Macedonia) Aleksandar Bajevski	Flamurtari Vlorë
Pelita Jaya	(Scotland) Chris Doig	Released	Aldershot Town	(Bulgaria) Stanislav Zhekov	Ludogorets Razgrad
Pelita Jaya	(Mali) Dramane Coulibaly	Released	Free agent	(Liberia) John Tarkpor	Persebaya 1927
Pelita Jaya	(Mali) Dramane Coulibaly	Released	Free agent	(Serbia) Saša Radivojević	Čukarički Stankom
Pelita Jaya	(Australia) Troy Hearfield	End of loan	Central Coast Mariners	(Nigeria) Victor Igbonefo	Persipura Jayapura
Pelita Jaya	(Australia) Troy Hearfield	End of loan	Central Coast Mariners	(Nigeria) Greg Nwokolo	Persija Jakarta
Persela Lamongan	(South Korea) Ahn Hyo-Yeon	Released	PSMS IPL	(Philippines) Satoshi Ōtomo	Bontang
Persela Lamongan	(Singapore) Fahrudin Mustafić	Released	Tampines Rovers	(Argentina) Mario Costas	Pro Duta
Persela Lamongan	(Singapore) Fahrudin Mustafić	Released	Tampines Rovers	(Slovakia) Roman Golian	Arema Indonesia
Persib Bandung	(Brazil) Hilton Moreira	Released	Sriwijaya	(Montenegro) Zdravko Dragićević	OFK Grbalj
Persib Bandung	(Japan) Matsunaga Shohei	Released	Persiba Balikpapan	(Australia) Robby Gaspar	Persema Malang
Persib Bandung	(Montenegro) Zdravko Dragićević ^{1}	Released	OFK Petrovac	(Ghana) Moses Sakyi	C.D. Pinhalnovense
Persiba Balikpapan	(Croatia) Mijo Dadić	Released	Deltras	(Croatia) Tomislav Labudović	Budapest Honvéd
Persiba Balikpapan	(South Korea) Kim Yong-hee	Released	Arema Indonesia	(Paraguay) Richard Caceres	
Persiba Balikpapan	(Singapore) Khairul Amri	Released	Singapore LIONSXII	(Japan) Kenji Adachihara	Bontang
Persiba Balikpapan	(Philippines) Jason de Jong	Released	Dordrecht	(Japan) Shohei Matsunaga	Persib Bandung
Persidafon Dafonsoro	(Liberia) Abiel Cielo	Released	Perseman Manokwari	(Cameroon) Eric Bayemi	Persija Jakarta
Persidafon Dafonsoro	(Nigeria) Ernest Jeremiah	Released		(Cameroon) Ngon A Djam	
Persidafon Dafonsoro	(Nigeria) Ernest Jeremiah	Released		(Singapore) Itimi Dickson	Geylang United
Persija Jakarta	(Cameroon) Eric Bayemi	Released	Persidafon Dafonsoro	(Brazil) Fabiano Beltrame	Persela Lamongan
Persija Jakarta	(Liberia) Oliver Makor	Released	Persik Kediri	(Argentina) Robertino Pugliara	Persiba Balikpapan
Persija Jakarta	(Singapore) Agu Casmir	Released	Singapore LIONSXII	(Paraguay) Pedro Velázquez	The Strongest
Persija Jakarta	(Nigeria) Greg Nwokolo^{2}	Transferred	Pelita Jaya	(Paraguay) Pedro Velázquez	The Strongest
Persipura Jayapura	(Nigeria) Victor Igbonefo^{2}	Transferred	Pelita Jaya	(Brazil) Beto Gonçalves	Persijap Jepara
Persiram Raja Ampat	(Liberia) James Debbah	Released	Free agent	(Liberia) Pello Benson	Persitara
Persiram Raja Ampat	(Liberia) James Debbah	Released	Free agent	(Cameroon) J.P. Boumsong	PSSB Bireuen
Persiram Raja Ampat	(Japan) Yusuke Sasa	Released	Free agent	(Malaysia) Tomoyuki Sakai	Persiwa Wamena
Persiram Raja Ampat	(Japan) Yusuke Sasa	Released	Free agent	(South Korea) Jeon Sung-Ha	Incheon Korail
Persisam Putra	(South Korea) Choi Dong-Soo	Released	PSMS Medan	(Australia) Boima Karpeh	Churchill Brothers
Persisam Putra	(Chile) Julio Lopez	Released	Persijap Jepara	(Cameroon) Luc Zoa	
Persisam Putra	(Uzbekistan) Pavel Solomin	Released	Tramvaychi Tashkent	(Montenegro) Srđan Lopičić	FK Lovćen
Persiwa Wamena	(Serbia) Saša Zečević	Released	PSMS Medan	(Nigeria) Onorionde Kughegbe	Persik Kediri
Persiwa Wamena	(Malaysia) Tomoyuki Sakai	Released	Persiram Raja Ampat	(Nigeria) Onorionde Kughegbe	Persik Kediri
PSAP Sigli	(Nigeria) Osas Saha	Transferred	PSMS Medan	(South Africa) Mfundo Cecil	Persita Tangerang
PSAP Sigli	(Nigeria) Osas Saha	Transferred	PSMS Medan	(South Africa) Sthembiso Ntombela	Rangers
PSAP Sigli	(Mali) Sylla Bamba	Released	Persipro Bond-U	(Mali) Sekou Camara	Engen Santos
PSAP Sigli	(Mali) Sylla Bamba	Released	Persipro Bond-U	(South Korea) Yoo Wook-Jin	Jeju United
PSAP Sigli	(Mali) Maussa Traore	Released	Free agent	(South Korea) Lee Soung Yong	
PSMS Medan	(Argentina) Gaston Castano	Transferred	Gresik United	(Nigeria) Osas Saha	PSAP Sigli
PSMS Medan	(Argentina) Gaston Castano	Transferred	Gresik United	(Chile) Luis Pena	Gresik United
PSMS Medan	(Brazil) Vagner Luis	Transferred	PSMS IPL	(Serbia) Saša Zečević	Persiwa Wamena
PSMS Medan	(Brazil) Vagner Luis	Transferred	PSMS IPL	(South Korea) Oh In-Kyun	PS Bengkulu
PSMS Medan	(Brazil) Almiro Valladares	Released	Free agent	(South Korea) Choi Dong-Soo	Persisam Putra
PSPS Pekanbaru	(South Korea) Shin Hyun Joon	Released	Deltras	(South Korea) Park Chul-Hyung	Semen Padang
PSPS Pekanbaru	(Cameroon) Banaken Bassoken	Released	Persijap Jepara	(Togo) Ali Khadaffi	Bontang
Sriwijaya	(Brazil) Diano	Released	Free agent	(Brazil) Hilton Moreira	Persib Bandung
Sriwijaya	(South Korea) Kim Yong-hee	End of loan	Persiba Balikpapan	(Brazil) Hilton Moreira	Persib Bandung

Notes:
^{1} = Player released after four opening match in the round I.
^{2} = Moved after changing citizenship to citizens of Indonesia.

== Second transfer window ==
Transfer window opening 1 April 2012 and closed on 22 April 2012.

=== Local Players ===
Team	Outgoing player	Manner of departure	Destination club	Incoming player	Previous club
Arema Indonesia	(Indonesia) Luxi Ariawan	Loan	Persekam Metro FC	(Indonesia) Kurnia Meiga	Arema IPL
Arema Indonesia	(Indonesia) Benny Kristian	Released	Free agent	(Indonesia) Johan Farisi	Arema IPL
Arema Indonesia	(Indonesia) Kery Yudiono	Released	Arema IPL	(Indonesia) Sunarto	Arema IPL
Arema Indonesia	(Indonesia) Kery Yudiono	Released	Arema IPL	(Indonesia) Dendi Santoso	Arema IPL
Arema Indonesia	(Indonesia) Boy Jati	Released	Free agent	(Indonesia) Hendro Siswanto	Arema IPL
Arema Indonesia	(Indonesia) Boy Jati	Released	Free agent	(Indonesia) Sutikno	Persiba Balikpapan
Deltras	None			(Indonesia) Herman Batak	Persiram Raja Ampat
Deltras	None			(Indonesia) Indra Kahfi	Persikota Tangerang
Gresik United	(Indonesia) Dani Namangge	Released	Free agent	(Indonesia) Hafit Saleman	
Gresik United	(Indonesia) Mujib Riduan	Released	Barito Putera	(Indonesia) Gangga Mudana	Persela Lamongan
Gresik United	(Indonesia) Satyo Husodo	Released	Barito Putera	(Indonesia) Rahmat Rivai	Sriwijaya
Persela Lamongan	(Indonesia) Ryco Fernanda	Released	Free agent	(Indonesia) Rendy Siregar	Sriwijaya
Persiba Balikpapan	(Indonesia) Sutikno	Loan	Arema Indonesia	None	
Persija Jakarta	(Indonesia) Alan Martha	Loan	Persepam Madura United	None	
Persipura Jayapura	(Indonesia) David Uron	Loan	Persiram Raja Ampat	(Indonesia) Yeremia Asmuruf	Persidafon Dafonsoro
Persipura Jayapura	(Indonesia) Imanuel Padwa	Released	Persiwa Wamena	(Indonesia) Yeremia Asmuruf	Persidafon Dafonsoro
Persiram Raja Ampat	(Indonesia) Didi Paroy	Released	Free agent	(Indonesia) David Uron	Persipura Jayapura
Persiram Raja Ampat	(Indonesia) Anda Hendrawan	Released	Free agent	(Indonesia) David Uron	Persipura Jayapura
Persiram Raja Ampat	(Indonesia) Herman Batak	Released	Deltras	(Indonesia) Arifin Geununi	PSAP Sigli
Persiram Raja Ampat	(Indonesia) Nehemia Solossa	Transferred	Barito Putera	(Indonesia) Arifin Geununi	PSAP Sigli
Persiram Raja Ampat	(Indonesia) Michael Sani	Released	Free agent	(Indonesia) Arifin Geununi	PSAP Sigli
Persisam Putra Samarinda	None			(Indonesia) Guntur Pranata	Persisam U-21
Persiwa Wamena	None			(Indonesia) Imanuel Padwa	Persipura Jayapura
PSAP Sigli	(Indonesia) Arifin Geununi	Transferred	Persiram Raja Ampat	(Indonesia) Muhammad Ikbal	PSAP Sigli U-21
PSAP Sigli	(Indonesia) Arifin Geununi	Transferred	Persiram Raja Ampat	(Indonesia) Muhammad Sabani	
PSAP Sigli	(Indonesia) Arifin Geununi	Transferred	Persiram Raja Ampat	(Indonesia) Indra Gunawan	
PSMS Medan	None			(Indonesia) Wiganda Pradika	PSMS Medan U-21
Sriwijaya	(Indonesia) Rendy Siregar	Released	Persela Lamongan	None	
Sriwijaya	(Indonesia) Jeki Arisandi	Released	Free agent	None	
Sriwijaya	(Indonesia) Markhus Bahtiar	Released	Persijap Jepara	None	
Sriwijaya	(Indonesia) Rahmat Rivai	Released	Gresik United	None	
Sriwijaya	(Indonesia) Ilham Jaya Kesuma	Released	Free agent	None	

=== Foreign Players ===
Team	Outgoing player	Manner of departure	Destination club	Incoming player	Previous club
Arema Indonesia	(Argentina) Rodrigo Santoni	Released	Free agent	(Cameroon) Alain N'Kong	Atjeh United
Arema Indonesia	(Brazil) Marcio Souza	Transferred	Persib Bandung	(Cameroon) Herman Dzumafo	PSPS Pekanbaru
Arema Indonesia	(South Korea) Kim Yong-hee	Released	Free agent	(Singapore) Muhammad Ridhuan	Arema IPL
Deltras	(Argentina) Walter Bruzuela	Released	Persebaya 1927	(Ivory Coast) Lacine Kone	Raja Casablanca
Deltras	(South Korea) Shin Hyun-Joon	Released	PSMS Medan	(Australia) Srećko Mitrović	PSM Makassar
Deltras	(Liberia) Amos Marah	Released	Free agent	(Liberia) James Koko	Gresik United
Gresik United	(Liberia) James Koko	Released	Deltras	(Argentina) Claudio Pronetto	
Gresik United	(Liberia) James Koko	Released	Deltras	(Australia) Daniel Zeleny	Mohun Bagan
Mitra Kukar	(England) Marcus Bent	Released	Free agent	(Netherlands) Kevin Oliviera	NAC Breda
Mitra Kukar	(Cameroon) Pierre Njanka	Released	Persisam Putra	(Cameroon) Gustave Bahoken	
Mitra Kukar	(Serbia) Nemanja Obrić	Contract terminated	Free agent	(Argentina) Esteban Herrera	Ñublense
Mitra Kukar	(Cameroon) Gustave Bahoken	Released	Free agent	(Brazil) Anderson Da Silva	Persik Kediri
Persela Lamongan	(Philippines) Satoshi Ōtomo	Released	Free agent	(South Korea) Oh In-Kyun	PSMS Medan
Persela Lamongan	(Philippines) Satoshi Ōtomo	Released	Free agent	(South Korea) Park Chul-Hyung	PSPS Pekanbaru
Persib Bandung	(Ghana) Moses Sakyi	Released	Free agent	(Brazil) Marcio Souza	Arema Indonesia
Persib Bandung	(Ghana) Moses Sakyi	Released	Free agent	(Singapore) Noh Alam Shah	Arema IPL
Persiba Balikpapan	(Paraguay) Richard Caceres	Released	Free agent	(Uruguay) Esteban Guillén	Arema IPL
Persija Jakarta	None			(South Korea) Jeong Kwang-Sik	Brisbane City
Persipura Jayapura	None			(South Korea) Choi Dong-Soo	PSMS Medan
Persiram Raja Ampat	(Liberia) Pello Benson	Released	Free agent	(Brazil) Anderson da Silva	
Persiram Raja Ampat	(South Korea) Jeon Sung-Ha	Released	PSAP Sigli	(South Korea) Yoo Wook-Jin	PSAP Sigli
Persisam Putra Samarinda	None			(South Korea) Kim Dong-Chan	Thai Port
Persisam Putra Samarinda	None			(Cameroon) Pierre Njanka	Mitra Kukar
Persiwa Wamena	None			(South Korea) Kang Hyun	Persita Tangerang
PSAP Sigli	(South Korea) Yoo Wook-Jin	Transferred	Persiram Raja Ampat	(South Korea) Jeon Sung-Ha	Persiram Raja Ampat
PSAP Sigli	(South Africa) Mfundo Cecil	Released	Free agent	(Sierra Leone) Abu Bakar	
PSMS Medan	(Chile) Luis Peña	Released	Free agent	(Slovenia) Nastja Čeh	Maccabi Petah Tikva
PSMS Medan	(South Korea) Oh In-Kyun	Released	Persela Lamongan	(South Korea) Shin Hyun-Joon	Deltras
PSMS Medan	(South Korea) Choi Dong-Soo	Released	Persipura Jayapura		
PSPS Pekanbaru	(South Korea) Park Chul-Hyung	Transferred	Persela Lamongan	(South Korea) Joo Ki-Hwan	Geylang United
PSPS Pekanbaru	(Cameroon) Herman Dzumafo	Transferred	Arema Indonesia	(Paraguay) Roberto Acosta	
PSPS Pekanbaru	(Paraguay) Roberto Acosta^{2}	Released	Free agent	(Nigeria) Kabir Bello	
PSPS Pekanbaru	(Paraguay) Roberto Acosta^{2}	Released	Free agent	(South Korea) Ko Jae-Hyo	
Sriwijaya	None			(Australia) Jamie Coyne	Sydney FC

Notes:
^{1} = Player released after play in the two opening match in the round II.
