= 2011–12 Persiraja Banda Aceh season =

Persiraja Banda Aceh
- Full name: Persatuan Sepakbola Indonesia Kutaraja Banda Aceh
- Nicknames: Rencong Army, The Kutaraja Tiger
- Founded: July 28, 1957 (55 years ago)
- Ground: Harapan Bangsa Stadium; Banda Aceh, Indonesia
- Capacity: 40.000
- Owner: PT Atjeh Sportinda Mandiri
- CEO: Akmal Marhali
- Manager: (Indonesia) Reza Fahlevi
- Coach: (Indonesia) Herry Kiswanto
- League: Indonesian Premier League
- 2011–12 IPL: 8th
Home colours	Away colours

The 2011–12 season is Persiraja Banda Aceh's 1st season since the inception of the Indonesian Premier League.

== Players ==
=== First team squad ===
Note: Flags indicate national team as defined under FIFA eligibility rules; some limited exceptions apply. Players may hold more than one non-FIFA nationality.

No.	Pos.	Nation	Player
1	GK	IDN	Amiruddin
3	DF	IDN	Andria
4	MF	IDN	Muhammad Guntur Triaji
5	DF	IDN	Yusrizal
6	MF	LBR	Stephen Mennoh
7	MF	IDN	Abdul Musawir (Vice Captain)
8	MF	IDN	Imral Usman
9	MF	IDN	Syakir Sulaiman
10	MF	TUN	Patrick Sofian Ghigani
11	MF	GUI	Diallo Abdoulaye Djibril (Captain)
12	DF	IDN	Gilang Angga Kusuma
14	FW	IDN	Arief Kurniawan
17	MF	IDN	Erik Saputra
18	DF	IDN	Agus Mulyadi

No.	Pos.	Nation	Player
19	MF	IDN	Muhammad Nasir Jangka
20	GK	IDN	Yuda Andhika
21	GK	IDN	Zulbahra
22	MF	IDN	Defri Rizky
23	DF	IDN	Yudi Khoerudin
25	DF	IDN	Rachmadani
26	MF	IDN	Herisman
27	FW	IDN	Fahrizal Dillah
28	MF	IDN	Mukhlis Nakata
30	DF	IDN	Irwanto
35	FW	TLS	Murilo de Almeida

== Transfer ==
Out:

Note: Flags indicate national team as defined under FIFA eligibility rules; some limited exceptions apply. Players may hold more than one non-FIFA nationality.

No.	Pos.	Nation	Player
2	DF	CHI	Cristian Alejandro Febre Santis (to (Indonesia) PSM Makassar)

== Matches ==
=== Indonesian Premier League ===
==== Results summary ====
Overall								Home						Away					
Pld	W	D	L	GF	GA	GD	Pts	W	D	L	GF	GA	GD	W	D	L	GF	GA	GD
22	9	5	8	27	30	−3	32	7	4	0	18	10	+8	2	1	8	9	20	−11

==== Table ====
Pos	Team	Pld	W	D	L	GF	GA	GD	Pts
5	Persiba Bantul	22	10	5	7	27	23	+4	35
6	PSM	22	9	7	6	29	26	+3	34
7	Persiraja	22	9	5	8	27	30	−3	32
8	Persema Malang (Note: Persema Malang, Jakarta FC, Persijap Jepara, Bontang FC, and PSMS Medan were deducted 3 points due to the punishment from PSSI's Discipline Committee)	22	10	4	8	32	32	0	31
9	Persija IPL (Jakarta FC)	22	7	7	8	38	34	+4	25

Updated to match(es) played on 17 July 2012. Source: IPL
Rules for classification: 1) points; 2) goal difference; 3) number of goals scored.

==== Fixtures and results ====
===== First round =====
26 November 2011 Matchday 1	Persiraja Banda Aceh	3 – 3	Persija Jakarta	Harapan Bangsa Stadium, Banda Aceh
15.30 WIB	Musawir 35', 50'; Gilang 73'		Sansan 31'; Danilo 37'; Rinto Ali 84'	Attendance: 15,743

1 December 2011 Matchday 2	Persiraja Banda Aceh	2 – 1	Persebaya 1927	Harapan Bangsa Stadium, Banda Aceh
15.30 WIB	Djibril 20'; Musawir 36'		Taufiq 9'	Attendance: 12,872

10 December 2011 Matchday 3	Persibo Bojonegoro	2 – 0	Persiraja Banda Aceh	Letjen Haji Sudirman Stadium, Bojonegoro
15.30 WIB	Samsul 15'; Mekan 18'

16 December 2011 Matchday 4	Persiraja Banda Aceh	0 – 0	Bontang FC	Harapan Bangsa Stadium, Banda Aceh
15.30 WIB				Attendance: 14,912

7 January 2012 Matchday 5	PSMS Medan	1 – 0	Persiraja Banda Aceh	Teladan Stadium, Medan
15.30 WIB	Jecky 53'

14 January 2012 Matchday 6	Persiraja Banda Aceh	1 – 1	Arema Malang	Harapan Bangsa Stadium, Banda Aceh
15.30 WIB	Djibril 45+1' (pen.)		Roman 56'	Attendance: 13,291

22 January 2012 Matchday 7	Persiraja Banda Aceh	2 – 1	Persijap Jepara	Harapan Bangsa Stadium, Banda Aceh
15.30 WIB	Imral 23'; Murilo 65'		Made Wirahadi 20'	Attendance: 17,201

30 January 2012 Matchday 8	Persema Malang	1 – 0	Persiraja Banda Aceh	Gajayana Stadium, Malang
19.00 WIB	Bima Sakti 49'

5 February 2012 Matchday 9	Persiraja Banda Aceh	2 – 2	Semen Padang	Harapan Bangsa Stadium, Banda Aceh
15.30 WIB	Defri 78'; Irwanto 82'		Ferdinand 3'; Edward 54'	Attendance: 15,390

20 February 2012 Matchday 10	Persiba Bantul	1 – 1	Persiraja Banda Aceh	Sultan Agung Stadium, Bantul
19.00 WIB	Ugik 9'		Patrick 27'

11 March 2012 Matchday 11	Persiraja Banda Aceh	2 – 1	PSM Makassar	Harapan Bangsa Stadium, Banda Aceh
15.30 WIB	Patrick 55'; Djibril 90+3'		Kwon Jun 58'	Attendance: 17,391

===== Second round =====
7 April 2012 Matchday 12	Persija Jakarta	3 – 1	Persiraja Banda Aceh	Wilis Stadium, Madiun
15.30 WIB	Danilo 25'; Hendra 39'; Sansan 81'		Fahrizal 46'

15 April 2012 Matchday 13	Persiraja Banda Aceh	2 – 1	Persiba Bantul	H. Dimurthala Stadium, Banda Aceh
16.00 WIB	Fahrizal 11', 74'		Riyanto 90+4'	Attendance: 19,417

28 April 2012 Matchday 14	Persiraja Banda Aceh	2 – 0	PSMS Medan	H. Dimurthala Stadium, Banda Aceh
15.30 WIB	Syakir 30'; Murilo 55'			Attendance: 19,836

13 May 2012 Matchday 15	Persiraja Banda Aceh	1 – 0	Persibo Bojonegoro	H. Dimurthala Stadium, Banda Aceh
15.30 WIB	Murilo 68' (pen.)			Attendance: 17,371

19 May 2012 Matchday 16	Bontang FC	1 – 2	Persiraja Banda Aceh	Mulawarman Stadium, Bontang
18.05 WIB	Jhon 67'		Murilo 39'; Syakir 54'

26 May 2012 Matchday 17	PSM Makassar	3 – 0	Persiraja Banda Aceh	Andi Mattalatta Stadium, Makassar
18.30 WIB	Rahmat 71', 92'; Ilija 23' (pen.)

3 June 2012 Matchday 18	Arema Malang	2 – 1	Persiraja Banda Aceh	Gajayana Stadium, Malang
15.30 WIB	Musafri 17'; Ahmad 25'		Arief 39'

10 June 2012 Matchday 19	Persijap Jepara	1 – 2	Persiraja Banda Aceh	Gelora Bumi Kartini Stadium, Jepara
15.30 WIB	Julio 60'		Arief 81'; Fahrizal 88'

17 June 2012 Matchday 20	Persiraja Banda Aceh	1 – 0	Persema Malang	H. Dimurthala Stadium, Banda Aceh
16.30 WIB	Arief 57'			Attendance: 19,462
Note: The match between Persiraja Banda Aceh and Persema Malang set a new world record. That is the second half extra time that added 15 minutes.

24 June 2012 Matchday 21	Semen Padang	3 – 1	Persiraja Banda Aceh	Haji Agus Salim Stadium, Padang
15.30 WIB	Edward 25' (pen.), 83'; Ferdinand 23'		Erik 90+1'

2 July 2012 Matchday 22	Persebaya 1927	2 – 1	Persiraja Banda Aceh	Gelora Bung Tomo Stadium, Surabaya
15.30 WIB	Mat Halil 37'; Fernando 84'		Arief 54'

=== 2012 Piala Indonesia ===
==== Second round ====
Team 1	Agg.	Team 2	1st leg	2nd leg
Persikabo Bogor	1 – 3	Persiraja Banda Aceh	0 – 0	1 – 3

===== Results =====
First Leg

11 April 2012

Persikabo Bogor	0 – 0	Persiraja Banda Aceh
	Report

Persikabo Stadium, Cibinong

Second Leg

18 April 2012

Persiraja Banda Aceh	3 – 1	Persikabo Bogor
Dillah 13'; Angga 23'; Yudi 49'	Report	Pepito 78'

H. Dimurthala Stadium, Banda Aceh

==== Third round ====
Team 1	Agg.	Team 2	1st leg	2nd leg
Persiraja Banda Aceh	3 – 4	PSMS Medan	3 – 2	0 – 2

===== Results =====
First Leg

9 May 2012

Persiraja Banda Aceh	3 – 2	PSMS Medan
Murilo 22'; Usman 73', 76'	Report	Vagner 52'; Andre 55'

H Dimurthala Stadium, Banda Aceh

Second Leg

30 May 2012

PSMS Medan	2 – 0	Persiraja Banda Aceh
Vagner 2'; Pasarela 87'

Teladan Stadium
