= 2011 Liga Indonesia Premier Division final =

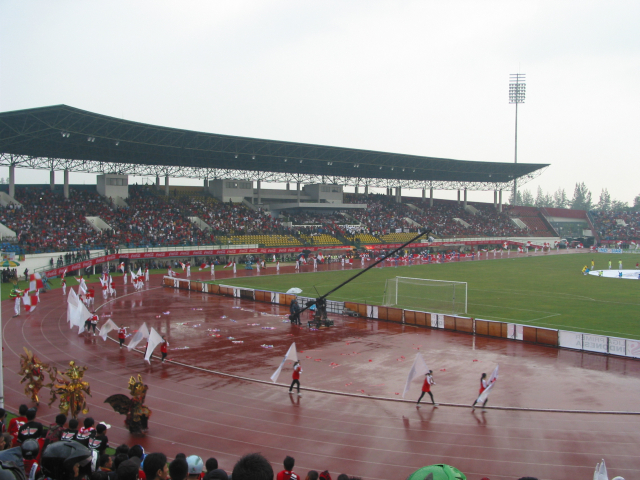
- Event: 2010–11 Liga Indonesia Premier Division
Persiba Bantul	Persiraja Banda Aceh
(Indonesia)	(Indonesia)
1	0
- Date: 25 May 2011
- Venue: Manahan Stadium, Solo, Central Java
- Liga Tiphone Man of the Match: Wahyu Wiji Astanto (Persiba Bantul)
- Referee: Jimmy Napitupulu (Indonesia)
- Attendance: 34,898
- Weather: Sunny

The 2011 Liga Indonesia Premier Division final was a football match which was played on Wednesday, 25 May 2011.

== Road to Final ==
Persiba Bantul			Round	Persiraja Banda Aceh		
Main article: 2010–11 Liga Indonesia Premier Division first group stage: Group 3: Team / Pld / W / D / L / GF / GA / GD / Pts; Persidafon Dafonsoro / 24 / 15 / 3 / 6 / 51 / 17 / +34 / 48; Persiba Bantul / 24 / 13 / 5 / 6 / 52 / 20 / +32 / 44; PSBI Blitar / 24 / 12 / 3 / 9 / 29 / 24 / +5 / 39; Persebaya Surabaya / 24 / 12 / 0 / 12 / 33 / 37 / −4 / 36; Barito Putra / 24 / 11 / 2 / 11 / 30 / 23 / +7 / 35; Persiku Kudus / 24 / 11 / 1 / 12 / 30 / 36 / -6 / 34; Persekam Metro FC / 24 / 11 / 1 / 12 / 28 / 37 / -9 / 34; Persigo Gorontalo / 24 / 11 / 3 / 10 / 30 / 30 / 0 / 33; Persipro Probolinggo / 24 / 9 / 4 / 11 / 23 / 35 / -12 / 31; PSS Sleman / 24 / 9 / 4 / 11 / 22 / 40 / -18 / 31; PSIR Rembang / 24 / 9 / 3 / 12 / 23 / 35 / -12 / 30; Perseru Serui / 24 / 7 / 4 / 12 / 27 / 32 / -5 / 28; PS Mojokerto Putra / 24 / 6 / 5 / 13 / 22 / 34 / -12 / 23			First Group stage	Main article: 2010–11 Liga Indonesia Premier Division first group stage: Group 1: Team / Pld / W / D / L / GF / GA / GD / Pts; Persiraja Banda Aceh / 24 / 15 / 3 / 6 / 43 / 25 / +18 / 48; PSAP Sigli / 24 / 14 / 5 / 5 / 53 / 20 / +33 / 47; PSMS Medan / 24 / 14 / 3 / 7 / 36 / 25 / +11 / 45; Persita Tangerang / 24 / 12 / 7 / 5 / 42 / 18 / +24 / 43; Persipasi Bekasi / 24 / 13 / 4 / 7 / 38 / 21 / +17 / 43; Persih Tembilahan / 24 / 13 / 3 / 8 / 31 / 32 / -1 / 42; Persitara Jakarta Utara / 24 / 9 / 6 / 9 / 29 / 34 / -5 / 33; Persikabo Bogor / 24 / 8 / 6 / 9 / 34 / 35 / -1 / 30; PSLS Lhokseumawe / 24 / 7 / 8 / 9 / 24 / 24 / 0 / 29; Bengkulu City FC / 24 / 7 / 6 / 11 / 20 / 35 / -15 / 27; Pro Titan FC / 24 / 5 / 8 / 10 / 26 / 32 / -6 / 23; PSSB Bireun / 24 / 4 / 6 / 14 / 19 / 35 / -16 / 18; Persires Rengat / 24 / 1 / 3 / 20 / 12 / 72 / -60 / 6		
Main article: 2010–11 Liga Indonesia Premier Division second group stage: Group B: Team / Pld / W / D / L / GF / GA / GD / Pts; Mitra Kukar / 3 / 2 / 1 / 0 / 4 / 1 / +3 / 7; Persiba Bantul / 3 / 0 / 3 / 0 / 3 / 3 / 0 / 3; PSAP Sigli / 3 / 0 / 2 / 1 / 1 / 2 / −1 / 2; PSMS Medan / 3 / 0 / 2 / 1 / 5 / 7 / −2 / 2			Second Group stage	Main article: 2010–11 Liga Indonesia Premier Division second group stage: Group A: Team / Pld / W / D / L / GF / GA / GD / Pts; Persidafon Jayapura / 3 / 2 / 1 / 0 / 7 / 4 / +3 / 7; Persiraja Banda Aceh / 3 / 1 / 1 / 1 / 3 / 4 / −1 / 4; Gresik United / 3 / 1 / 0 / 2 / 6 / 7 / −1 / 3; Persiram Raja Ampat / 3 / 1 / 0 / 2 / 5 / 6 / −1 / 3		
Opponent	Result	Legs	Knockout stage	Opponent	Result	Legs
Persidafon Jayapura	5-2	One-leg match played	Semifinals	Mitra Kukar	1-0	One-leg match played

== Match details ==
25 May 2011
19:00 WIB

Persiba Bantul	1 – 0	Persiraja Banda Aceh
Wahyu 45'	Report

Manahan Stadium, Solo, Central Java
Attendance: 34,898
Referee: Jimmy Napitupulu (Indonesia)

Persiba Bantul	Persiraja Banda Aceh

Persiba Bantul: 4-3-1-2
GK	1	(Indonesia) Wahyu Tri Nugroho
DF	5	(Indonesia) Nopendi
DF	18	(Indonesia) Muhammad Ansori	(substituted off) 79'
DF	13	(Indonesia) Wahyu Wiji Astanto (c)	(yellow card) 15'	45'
DF	19	(Indonesia) Slamet Widodo
MF	11	(Indonesia) Slamet Nurcahyo	(substituted off) 88'
MF	23	(Indonesia) Arwin
MF	7	(Indonesia) Busari
MF	9	(Argentina) Ezequiel González	(yellow card) 34'
FW	22	(Indonesia) Ugiex Sugiyanto
FW	10	(Nigeria) Udo Fortune
Substitutes
GK	45	(Indonesia) Hiskia Rambing
DF	2	(Indonesia) Ardi Suyanto
MF	3	(Indonesia) Anwarudin	(substituted on) 79'
FW	8	(Indonesia) Choirul Anam
FW	16	(Indonesia) Xyz Roeroe
MF	26	(Indonesia) Johan Manaji	(substituted on) 88'
FW	27	(Indonesia) Seto Nurdiyantara
Head coach
(Indonesia) Sajuri Syahid

Deltras Sidoarjo: 4-4-1-1
GK	21	(Indonesia) Yuda Andika
DF	30	(Indonesia) Irwanto
DF	14	(Indonesia) Qadar Usman
DF	13	(Cameroon) Eli Maurel Mayega (substituted off) 85'
DF	3	(Indonesia) Andria
MF	7	(Indonesia) Abdul Musawir (c)
MF	18	(Indonesia) Herisman
MF	12	(Indonesia) Erik Saputra
MF	11	(Guinea) Abdoulaye Djibril Diallo
MF	78	(Indonesia) Mukhlis Nakata	(substituted off) 69'
FW	27	(Indonesia) Fahrizal Dilla
Substitutes
GK	1	(Indonesia) Dicky Anggriawan
MF	8	(Indonesia) Aswin Sitours
FW	9	(Indonesia) Novanda
DF	15	(Indonesia) Adhi Sismanto
FW	17	(Indonesia) Nanda Lubis (substituted on) 69'
DF	25	(Indonesia) Farijal (substituted on) 85'
MF	28	(Indonesia) Azhari
Head coach
(Indonesia) Herry Kiswanto

Man of the Match:
(Indonesia) Wahyu Wiji Astanto (Persiba Bantul)

Assistant referees:
???
???
Fourth official:
???

Match rules

- 90 minutes.
- 30 minutes of extra time if necessary.
- Penalty shoot-out if scores still level.
- Seven named substitutes, of which up to three may be used.

== See also ==
- 2010–11 Liga Indonesia Premier Division
