= 2012 Aceh Governor Cup =

2012 Gubernur Aceh Cup
Piala Gubernur Aceh 2012

Tournament details
- Host country: Indonesia
- City: Banda Aceh
- Dates: 15–22 December 2012
- Teams: 6 (from 1 sub-confederation)
- Venue: Harapan Bangsa Stadium

Final positions
- Champions: (Indonesia) Aceh FC (1st title)
- Runners-up: (Indonesia) Semen Padang
- Third place: (Malaysia) Selangor FA
- Fourth place: Brunei DPMM FC

Tournament statistics
- Matches played: 10
- Goals scored: 32 (3.2 per match)
- Attendance: 35,000 (3,500 per match)
- Top scorer: (Indonesia) Edward Junior Wilson (6 goals)

The 2012 Aceh Governor Cup was played at Harapan Bangsa Stadium, Banda Aceh, Indonesia from 15 to 23 December 2012.

== Venues ==
Venues; 2012 Aceh Governor Cup at the Harapan Bangsa Stadium in Banda Aceh, Indonesia. Capacity Stadium : 45,000

== Group stage ==
- All matches were played in Indonesia.
- Times listed are UTC+7.

=== Group A ===
| Team | Pld | W | D | L | GF | GA | GD | Pts |
|---|---|---|---|---|---|---|---|---|
| (Indonesia) Aceh FC | 2 | 2 | 0 | 0 | 3 | 0 | +3 | 6 |
| (Malaysia) Selangor FA | 2 | 0 | 1 | 1 | 1 | 1 | 0 | 1 |
| (Indonesia) Makassar United | 2 | 0 | 1 | 1 | 1 | 3 | −2 | 1 |

15 December 2012
16:00

| Aceh FC (Indonesia) | 2 – 0 | (Indonesia) Makassar United |
|---|---|---|
| Fahrizal Dillah 72'; Mukhlis Nakata 81' | Report |

Harapan Bangsa Stadium

16 December 2012
16:00

| Makassar United (Indonesia) | 1 – 1 | (Malaysia) Selangor FA |
|---|---|---|
| Jakson 73' | Report | Francis Doe Forkey 90' |

Harapan Bangsa Stadium

17 December 2012
20:00

| Selangor FA (Malaysia) | 0 – 1 | (Indonesia) Aceh FC |
|---|---|---|
| | Report | Muhammad Syakir 33' (pen.) |

Harapan Bangsa Stadium

=== Group B ===
| Team | Pld | W | D | L | GF | GA | GD | Pts | Qualification |
|---|---|---|---|---|---|---|---|---|---|
| (Indonesia) Semen Padang | 2 | 2 | 0 | 0 | 8 | 4 | +4 | 6 | Advance to knockout stage |
| Brunei DPMM FC | 2 | 0 | 1 | 1 | 3 | 5 | −2 | 1 | Advance to knockout stage |
| (Malaysia) Kelantan FA | 2 | 0 | 1 | 1 | 3 | 5 | −2 | 1 | |

15 December 2012
20:00

| Semen Padang (Indonesia) | 4 – 2 | Brunei DPMM FC |
|---|---|---|
| Titus Bonai 3', 18', 80'; Edward Junior Wilson 50' | Report | Azwan Salleh 28'; Rocha De Carvalho Victor 55' |

Harapan Bangsa Stadium

16 December 2012
20:00

| Brunei DPMM FC | 1 – 1 | (Malaysia) Kelantan FA |
|---|---|---|
| João Moreira 66' | Report | Dimitri Petratos 75' |

Harapan Bangsa Stadium

17 December 2012
16:00

| Kelantan FA (Malaysia) | 2 – 4 | (Indonesia) Semen Padang |
|---|---|---|
| Badhri Radzi 26'; Dimitri Petratos 68' | Report | Edward Junior Wilson 24', 33' (pen.), 69'; Muhammad Rizal 68' |

Harapan Bangsa Stadium

== Knockout stage ==
Semi-finals
A1 | (Indonesia) Aceh FC | 1 | 2 | 3
B2 | Brunei DPMM FC | 1 | 1 | 2
B1 | (Indonesia) Semen Padang | 2 | 1 | 3
A2 | (Malaysia) Selangor FA | 1 | 0 | 1

Final
A1 | (Indonesia) Aceh FC | 0 | 2 | 2
B1 | (Indonesia) Semen Padang | 0 | 0 | 0

== Semi-final ==
19 December 2012
16:00

| Aceh FC (Indonesia) | 3 – 2 | Brunei DPMM FC |
|---|---|---|
| Mahdi Senegal 23'; Defri Rizky 78'; Ismed Sofyan 90' | Report | Mohd Shahrazen Said 36' (pen.); 90' |

Harapan Bangsa Stadium

19 December 2012
20:00

| Semen Padang (Indonesia) | 3 – 1 | (Malaysia) Selangor FA |
|---|---|---|
| Edward Junior Wilson 7', 24'; Hendra Bayauw 85' | Report | Afiq Azmi 29' |

Harapan Bangsa Stadium

== Third Place ==
22 December 2012
16:00

| Brunei DPMM FC | 1 – 1 | (Malaysia) Selangor FA |
|---|---|---|
| Mohd Shahrazen Said 28' | Report | Ramzul Zahini 61' |
Penalties
| Adi Said; Mohd Shahrazen Said | 2 – 3 | Ramez Dayoub; Mahali Jasuli; Francis Doe Forkey |

Harapan Bangsa Stadium

== Final ==
22 December 2012
20:00

| Aceh FC (Indonesia) | 2 – 0 | (Indonesia) Semen Padang |
|---|---|---|
| Reza Fandi 75'; Defri Rizki 88' | Report |

Harapan Bangsa Stadium

== Goalscorers ==
6 goals

- (Indonesia) Edward Junior Wilson

3 goals

- (Indonesia) Titus Bonai

2 goals

- (Brunei) Mohd Shahrazen Said
- (Malaysia) Dimitri Petratos

1 goal

- (Brunei) Azwan Salleh
- (Brunei) João Moreira
- (Indonesia) Fahrizal Dilla
- (Indonesia) Defri Rizki
- (Indonesia) Hendra Bayauw
- (Indonesia) Ismed Sofyan
- (Indonesia) Jakson
- (Indonesia) Mahdi Senegal
- (Indonesia) Reza Fandi
- (Indonesia) Muhammad Syakir
- (Indonesia) Muhammad Rizal
- (Indonesia) Mukhlis Nakata
- (Malaysia) Badhri Radzi
- (Malaysia) Francis Doe Forkey
- (Malaysia) Ramzul Zahini
