= M. Zahrul Bin Azhar =

Indonesian footballer

Zahrul Azhar
Personal information
- Full name: Muhammad Zahrul bin Azhar
- Date of birth: 5 September 1982 (age 44)
- Place of birth: Indonesia
- Height: 1.65 m (5 ft 5 in)
- Position: Midfielder

Senior career*
Years	Team	Apps	(Gls)
2008–2013	PSPS Pekanbaru	45	(2)
2011 (6 month)	→ Persih Tembilahan (loan)	15	(4)
- * Club domestic league appearances and goals as of 11 July 2012

M. Zahrul Bin Azhar (born September 5, 1982) is an Indonesian former footballer who plays as a midfielder.

== Club statistics ==
Club	Season	Super League		Premier Division		Piala Indonesia		Total	
Club	Season	Apps	Goals	Apps	Goals	Apps	Goals	Apps	Goals
PSPS Pekanbaru	2009-10	8	0	-		2	0	10	0
PSPS Pekanbaru	2010-11	5	0	-		-		5	0
Persih Tembilahan	2010-11	-		15	4	-		15	4
PSPS Pekanbaru	2011-12	22	1	-		-		22	1
Total		35	0	15	4	2	0	52	5
