= Luis Peña =

Luis Peña may refer to:

- Luis Peña (actor) (1918–1977), Spanish actor
- Luis Peña (footballer) (born 1979), Chilean football midfielder
- Luis Peña (fighter) (born 1993), Italian-born American professional mixed-martial artist
- Luis Peña (baseball) (born 2006), Dominican baseball player
