= 2010–11 Liga Indonesia Premier Division =

Liga Indonesia Premier Division
- Season: 2010–11
- Champions: Persiba Bantul
- Promoted: Persiba Bantul; Persiraja Banda Aceh; Mitra Kukar; Persidafon Jayapura (via play-off)
- Relegated: --
- Matches played: 484
- Goals scored: 1,171 (2.42 per match)
- Top goalscorer: Fortune Udo (34)
- Biggest home win: PSAP Sigli 10-0 Persires Rengat (29 March 2011)
- Biggest away win: Persires 0-4 PSAP Sigli (16 December 2010); Persires 0-4 Pro Titan FC (21 March 2011)
- Highest scoring: PSAP Sigli 10-0 Persires Rengat (29 March 2011)
- Longest winning run: Persiraja Banda Aceh; PSAP Sigli (6 games)
- Longest unbeaten run: Persidafon Dafonsoro (from 22 November 2010 to 1 March 2011) (13 games)
- Longest losing run: Persires Rengat (7 games)
- Highest attendance: 34,898; Persiba Bantul – Persiraja Banda Aceh
- Lowest attendance: 100; Persires Rengat – Persiraja Banda Aceh

The 2010–11 Liga Indonesia Premier Division, also known as 2010–11 Liga Ti-Phone Indonesia season, was the sixteenth edition of Liga Indonesia Premier Division since its establishment in 1994. The competition ran from 19 November 2010 to 25 May 2011.

As in the previous seasons, there will be around 39 clubs, divided into three groups.

== Participants ==
=== Relegated clubs from 2009–10 Indonesia Super League ===
- Persik Kediri
- Persebaya Surabaya^{1}
- Persitara North Jakarta

=== Promoted clubs from First Division ===
- PSCS Cilacap
- Persekam Metro FC
- Bengkulu City FC
- PSLS Lhokseumawe
- Perseru Serui
- Persemalra Maluku Tenggara
- Barito Putra
- Persikubar Kutai Barat^{2}

=== 2010–11 season clubs ===
- Gresik United
- PSAP Sigli
- PSIM Yogyakarta
- PSMS Medan
- PS Mojokerto Putra
- Persidafon Jayapura
- Persikab Kabupaten Bandung
- Persiku Kudus
- Persiraja Banda Aceh
- Mitra Kukar
- PSBI Blitar
- PSIR Rembang
- PSS Sleman
- Perseman Manokwari
- Persigo Gorontalo
- Persikabo Bogor
- Persipasi Bekasi
- Persita Tangerang
- PPSM Sakti Magelang
- PSDS Deli Serdang^{3}
- PSIS Semarang
- PSSB Bireuen
- Persiba Bantul
- Persih Tembilahan
- Persikota Tangerang
- Persipro Probolinggo
- Pro Titan Football Club

=== Lose in play-off promotion/relegation 2010 ===
- Persiram Raja Ampat

1= Persebaya Surabaya decided out of the competition held by PSSI that led to the membership Persebaya suspended. Then, they chose to join with Liga Primer Indonesia.

2= League Board decided Persires Rengat to replace Persikubar West Kutai as a participant in the premiere division because of financial problem in Persikubar. Later, it was revealed that Persikubar has been sold to Surabaya, to kept them in the competition.

3= PSDS Deli Serdang resigned because of financial problems and replaced by Persis Solo.

== Foreign players ==
=== West ===
Club	Visa 1	Visa 2	Visa 3	Visa 4	Visa 5	Non-Visa Foreign
Bengkulu City FC	(South Korea) Oh In-Kyun	(Nigeria) Peter Lipede	(Cameroon) Sadissou Bako	None	None	None
Persih Tembilahan	(Argentina) Adrian Veron	(Nigeria) Gbeneme Friday	(Brazil) Toyo^{4}	None	None	None
Persikabo Bogor	(Nigeria) Emeka Okoye	(Moldova) Eduard Valuta	(Cameroon) Cyril Tchana	None	None	None
Persipasi Bekasi	(Liberia) Stephen Mennoh	(Liberia) Morris Power	(Cameroon) Emaleu Serge	None	None	None
Persiraja Banda Aceh	(Cameroon) Christian Bekatal	(Guinea) Abdoulaye Djibril	(Cameroon) Eli Mayega	None	None	None
Persires Rengat	(Liberia) Sylla Daouda	(Guinea) Mamadou Hady Barry	None	None	None	None
Persita Tangerang	(Chile) Cristian Carrasco	(Chile) Luis Edmundo	(South Africa) Mfundo Cecil	None	None	None
Persitara North Jakarta	(Cameroon) Jacques Evrad	(Sierra Leone) Brima Pepito	(Liberia) Pello Benson	None	None	None
Pro Titan FC	(Argentina) Mario Costas	(Brazil) Antonio Teles	None	None	None	None
PSAP Sigli	(Nigeria) Osas Saha	(Mali) Sylla Bamba	(Mali) Maussa Traore	None	None	None
PSLS Lhokseumawe	(Argentina) Carlos Sciucatti	(Cameroon) Salomon Koube	(Liberia) Konah David	None	None	None
PSMS Medan	(Argentina) Gaston Castano	(Brazil) Vagner Luis	(Brazil) Almiro Valladares	None	None	None
PSSB Bireuen	(Cameroon) J.P. Boumsong	(Cameroon) Daniels Bikoi	(Cameroon) Nnana Onana	None	None	None

=== Central ===
Club	Visa 1	Visa 2	Visa 3	Visa 4	Visa 5	Non-Visa Foreign
Gresik United	(Chile) Luis Pena	(Brazil) Leke Anderson	(Paraguay) Alberto Paredes	None	None	None
Mitra Kukar	(Argentina) Franco Hita	(Brazil) Anderson Da Silva	(Cameroon) Mbom Mbom Julien	None	None	None
Persemalra Maluku Tenggara	None	None	None	None	None	None
Perseman Manokwari	(Morocco) Tarik Chaqui	(Liberia) Alex Robinson	(Brazil) Jairon Feliciano	None	None	None
Persik Kediri	(Argentina) Adrian Trinidad	(Turkmenistan) Mekan Nasyrow	None	None	None	None
Persikab Bandung	(Nigeria) Angel Ebus	(Argentina) Pablo Frances	(Cameroon) J.C. Kamga	None	None	None
Persikota Tangerang	(Serbia) Dušan Bogdanović	(Brazil) Michel Adolfo	(Brazil) Bruno Zandonaide	None	None	None
Persiram Raja Ampat	(Liberia) James Debbah	(Japan) Yusuke Sasa	(Liberia) Kubay Quaiyan	None	None	None
Persis Solo	None	None	None	None	None	None
PPSM Sakti Magelang	(Cameroon) Mbaiogauo Dillah	(Cameroon) Nicolas Djone	(Liberia) Roberto Kwateh	None	None	None
PSCS Cilacap	(South Korea) Su Hyong-Lee	(Cameroon) Guy Herve Mahop	(South Korea) Jun Jin	None	None	None
PSIM Yogyakarta	None	None	None	None	None	None
PSIS Semarang	(Argentina) Gustavo Chena	(Argentina) Rodrigo Santoni	(Chile) Patricio Jimenez	None	None	None

=== East ===
Club	Visa 1	Visa 2	Visa 3	Visa 4	Visa 5	Non-Visa Foreign
Barito Putra	(Paraguay) Arnaldo Villalba	(Cameroon) Bienvenue Nnengue	None	None	None	None
Persebaya DU (Bhayangkara)	(Cameroon) Charles Orock	(Guinea) Fassawa Camara	(Liberia) Sackie Doe	None	None	None
Persekam Metro FC	(Cameroon) Henry Njobi	(Cameroon) Lois Eduardo	None	None	None	None
Perseru Serui	(Guinea) Mamadaou Diallo	(Nigeria) Daniel Agochukwu	None	None	None	None
Persiba Bantul	(Argentina) Ezequiel González	(Nigeria) Udo Fortune	(Cameroon) Bruno Casimir	None	None	None
Persidafon Jayapura	(Liberia) Abiel Cielo	(Nigeria) Ernest Jeremiah	(Argentina) Marcelo Cirelli	None	None	None
Persigo Gorontalo	(Cameroon) Henri Joel	None	None	None	None	None
Persiku Kudus	(Chile) Alejandro Tobar	(Brazil) William Moreno	(Nigeria) George Oyedepo	None	None	None
Persipro Probolinggo	None	None	None	None	None	None
PSBI Blitar	(Cameroon) Wandjou Olivier	(Liberia) Varney Pas Boakay	(South Korea) Han Ji-Ho	None	None	(Cameroon) Sylvain Moukwelle^{5}
PSIR Rembang	(Brazil) Victor Da Silva	(Paraguay) Cristian Rene	(Argentina) Leonardo Felicia	None	None	None
PS Mojokerto Putra	(Cameroon) Anderson Pohos	(Brazil) Evandro	(Liberia) Patrick Nuku	None	None	None
PSS Sleman	None	None	None	None	None	None

These players do not fill a Visa position:
^{1}Those players who were born and started their professional career abroad but have since gained Indonesia Residency;
^{2}Foreign residents or foreign residents of Indonesian descent who have chosen to represent Indonesian national team;
^{3}Players with Indonesian descent who were born and started their professional career abroad, but will have since gained Indonesia Residency;
^{4}Those players who were born and started their professional career abroad, but will have since gained Indonesia Residency;
^{5}Injured replacement players;

== First round ==
Key to colours in group tables
advanced to the 2010–11 Liga Indonesia Premier Division Second Round

Play on 19 November 2010 to 30 April 2011.

=== Group 1 ===
Locations of the teams in the group 1 of 2010–11 Liga Indonesia Premier Division

Pos	Team	Pld	W	D	L	GF	GA	GD	Pts	Qualification
1	Persiraja Banda Aceh	24	15	3	6	43	25	+18	48	Advanced to the 2010–11 Liga Indonesia Premier Division Second Round
2	PSAP Sigli	24	15	2	7	53	20	+33	47	Advanced to the 2010–11 Liga Indonesia Premier Division Second Round
3	PSMS Medan	24	14	3	7	36	25	+11	45	Advanced to the 2010–11 Liga Indonesia Premier Division Second Round
4	Persita Tangerang	24	12	7	5	42	18	+24	43	
5	Persipasi Bekasi	24	13	4	7	38	21	+17	43	
6	Persih Tembilahan	24	13	3	8	31	32	−1	42	
7	Persitara Jakarta Utara	24	9	6	9	29	34	−5	33	
8	Persikabo Bogor	24	8	7	9	34	35	−1	31	
9	PSLS Lhokseumawe	24	7	8	9	24	24	0	29	
10	PS Bengkulu	24	7	6	11	20	35	−15	27	
11	Pro Duta FC	24	5	9	10	26	32	−6	24	
12	PSSB Bireun	24	4	6	14	19	35	−16	18	
13	Persires Rengat	24	1	3	20	12	72	−60	6	

=== Group 2 ===
Locations of the teams in the group 2 of 2010–11 Liga Indonesia Premier Division

Pos	Team	Pld	W	D	L	GF	GA	GD	Pts	Qualification
1	Mitra Kukar	24	15	2	7	38	20	+18	47	Advanced to the 2010–11 Liga Indonesia Premier Division Second Round
2	Persiram Raja Ampat	24	11	9	4	26	18	+8	42	Advanced to the 2010–11 Liga Indonesia Premier Division Second Round
3	Gresik United	24	12	4	8	27	16	+11	40	Advanced to the 2010–11 Liga Indonesia Premier Division Second Round
4	Perseman Manokwari	24	12	3	9	22	15	+7	39	
5	PSIM Yogyakarta	24	12	3	9	26	22	+4	39	
6	Persik Kediri	24	11	3	10	25	21	+4	36	
7	Persikab Kabupaten Bandung	24	10	5	9	31	30	+1	35	
8	PSIS Semarang	24	10	5	9	22	22	0	35	
9	PSCS Cilacap	24	9	5	10	25	26	−1	32	
10	Persemalra Maluku Tenggara	24	10	1	13	31	31	0	31	
11	PPSM Sakti Magelang	24	9	3	12	18	26	−8	30	
12	Persikota Tangerang	24	6	8	10	18	24	−6	26	
13	Persis Solo	24	1	5	18	9	47	−38	8	

=== Group 3 ===
Locations of the teams in the group 3 of 2010–11 Liga Indonesia Premier Division

Pos	Team	Pld	W	D	L	GF	GA	GD	Pts	Qualification
1	Persidafon Dafonsoro	24	15	3	6	51	17	+34	48	Advanced to the 2010–11 Liga Indonesia Premier Division Second Round
2	Persiba Bantul	24	13	5	6	52	20	+32	44	Advanced to the 2010–11 Liga Indonesia Premier Division Second Round
3	PSBI Blitar	24	12	3	9	29	24	+5	39	
4	Persigo Gorontalo	24	11	3	10	30	30	0	36	
5	Persebaya DU (Bhayangkara)	24	12	0	12	33	37	−4	36	
6	Barito Putra	24	11	2	11	30	23	+7	35	
7	Persiku Kudus	24	11	1	12	30	36	−6	34	
8	Persekam Metro FC	24	11	1	12	28	37	−9	34	
9	Persipro Probolinggo	24	9	4	11	23	35	−12	31	
10	PSS Sleman	24	9	4	11	22	40	−18	31	
11	PSIR Rembang	24	9	3	12	23	35	−12	30	
12	Perseru Serui	24	8	4	12	27	32	−5	28	
13	PS Mojokerto Putra	24	6	5	13	22	34	−12	23	

Source: Barclays Premier League
Rules for classification: 1) points; 2) goal difference; 3) number of goals scored.

=== Ranking of third placed teams ===
Grp	Team	Pld	W	D	L	GF	GA	GD	Pts
1	PSMS Medan	24	14	3	7	36	25	+11	45
2	Gresik United	24	12	4	8	27	16	+11	40
3	PSBI Blitar	24	12	3	9	29	24	+5	39

== Second round ==
Group	Winners	Runners-up
1	Persiraja Banda Aceh	PSAP Sigli
2	Mitra Kukar	Persiram Raja Ampat
3	Persidafon Jayapura	Persiba Bantul
Best 3rd	PSMS Medan	Gresik United

Key to colours in group tables
Top two placed teams advance to the Semifinal

Legend
Group winners and second-placed directly qualify for the semi-finals

=== Group A ===
- 5 matches were played in Mandala Stadium, Jayapura, Papua.
- 1 match were played in Barnabas Youwe Stadium, Sentani, Jayapura Regency, Papua.
- All times are Eastern Indonesia Time (WIT) – UTC+09:00.

Pos	Team	Pld	W	D	L	GF	GA	GD	Pts	Qualification
1	Persidafon Dafonsoro	3	2	1	0	7	4	+3	7	Advanced to the Semifinals
2	Persiraja Banda Aceh	3	1	1	1	3	4	−1	4	Advanced to the Semifinals
3	Gresik United	3	1	0	2	6	7	−1	3	
4	Persiram Raja Ampat	3	1	0	2	5	6	−1	3	

12 May 2011
17:30 WIT

Persidafon Jayapura	3–1	Persiram Raja Ampat
Jeremiah 10' (pen.), 54'; Iz. Wanggai 79'	Report	Sasa 4'

Mandala Stadium, Jayapura, Papua
Attendance: 800
Referee: Hadi Suroso (Indonesia)
12 May 2011
21:00 WIT

Persiraja Banda Aceh	2–1	Gresik United
Djibril 18'; Bekatal 69'	Report	Herry 31'

Mandala Stadium, Jayapura, Papua
Attendance: 1,137
Referee: Najamuddin Aspiran (Indonesia)

14 May 2011
17:30 WIT

Gresik United	2–3	Persidafon Jayapura
Nawawi 45+2'; Pena 86'	Report	P. Wanggai 15'; Jeremiah 39' (pen.); Cirelli 43'

Mandala Stadium, Jayapura, Papua
Attendance: 1,000
Referee: Ahmad Suparman (Indonesia)
14 May 2011
21:00 WIT

Persiram Raja Ampat	2–0	Persiraja Banda Aceh
N. Solossa 50'; Tao 87' (pen.)	Report

Mandala Stadium, Jayapura, Papua
Attendance: 852
Referee: Suharto (Indonesia)

17 May 2011
15:05 WIT

Persidafon Jayapura	1–1	Persiraja Banda Aceh
Rasmoyo 26'	Report	Qadar 33'

Mandala Stadium, Jayapura, Papua
Attendance: 1,763
Referee: Novari Ikhsan Arilaha (Indonesia)
17 May 2011
15:05 WIT

Persiram Raja Ampat	2–3	Gresik United
Tao 43' (pen.); Sander 77'	Report	Nawawi 6', 57'; Arufin 22'

Barnabas Youwe, Jayapura Regency, Papua
Attendance: 1,153
Referee: Najamuddin Aspiran (Indonesia)

=== Group B ===
- 5 matches were played in Madya Kudunga Tenggarong Stadium, Kutai Kartanegara, East Kalimantan.
- 1 match were played in Segiri Samarinda Stadium, Samarinda, East Kalimantan.
- All times are Central Indonesia Time (WITA) – UTC+08:00.

Pos	Team	Pld	W	D	L	GF	GA	GD	Pts	Qualification
1	Mitra Kukar	3	2	1	0	4	1	+3	7	Advanced to the Semifinals
2	Persiba Bantul	3	0	3	0	3	3	0	3	Advanced to the Semifinals
3	PSAP Sigli	3	0	2	1	1	2	−1	2	
4	PSMS Medan	3	0	2	1	5	7	−2	2	

13 May 2011
16:30 WITA

Mitra Kukar	0–0	Persiba Bantul
	Report

Madya Kudunga, Kutai Kartanegara, East Kalimantan
Attendance: 3,503
Referee: Anselmus (Indonesia)
13 May 2011
20:00 WITA

PSAP Sigli	1–1	PSMS Medan
Feri Komul 14'	Report	Faisal 40'

Madya Kudunga, Kutai Kartanegara, East Kalimantan
Attendance: 1,112
Referee: Iis Isya Permana (Indonesia)

15 May 2011
16:30 WITA

PSMS Medan	1–3	Mitra Kukar
Gaston 87' (pen.)	Report	Boy Jati 9'; Hita 28'; Junaedi 67'

Madya Kudunga, Kutai Kartanegara, East Kalimantan
Attendance: 3,601
Referee: Prasetyo Hadi (Indonesia)
15 May 2011
20:00 WITA

Persiba Bantul	0–0	PSAP Sigli
	Report

Madya Kudunga, Kutai Kartanegara, East Kalimantan
Attendance: 1,502
Referee: Dodi Setya Purnomo (Indonesia)

18 May 2011
16:30 WITA

Mitra Kukar	1–0	PSAP Sigli
Hita 50'	Report

Madya Kudunga, Kutai Kartanegara, East Kalimantan
Attendance: 3,127
Referee: Iis Isya Permana (Indonesia)
18 May 2011
16:30 WITA

Persiba Bantul	3–3	PSMS Medan
Fortune 53', 75', 85'	Report	Gaston 15'; Dony 36'; Rinaldo 43'

Segiri, Samarinda, East Kalimantan
Attendance: 1,439
Referee: Retu Slamet Wijaya (Indonesia)

== Knockout phase ==
The knockout phase is scheduled on 22 & 25 May 2011.

Semi-finals
22 May 2011 - Manahan, Solo
Persidafon Jayapura	2
Persiba Bantul	5
22 May 2011 - Manahan, Solo
Mitra Kukar	0
Persiraja Banda Aceh	1

Final
25 May 2011 - Manahan, Solo
Persiba Bantul	1
Persiraja Banda Aceh	0
Third place
25 May 2011 - Manahan, Solo
Persidafon Jayapura	1
Mitra Kukar	2

=== Semifinals ===
22 May 2011
15:30 WIB

Persidafon Jayapura	2–5	Persiba Bantul (P)
Harianto 9'; P. Wanggai 45+2'	Report	E. González 15', 40'; Ugiex 18', 45+3', 73'

Manahan, Solo, Central Java
Attendance: 34,126
Referee: Setiyono (Indonesia)
22 May 2011
19:00 WIB

Mitra Kukar	0–1	Persiraja Banda Aceh (P)
	Report	Fahrizal Dillah 31'

Manahan, Solo, Central Java
Attendance: 1,025
Referee: Djumadi Effendi (Indonesia)

=== Third place ===
25 May 2011
15:30 WIB

Persidafon Jayapura	1–2	Mitra Kukar (P)
Jeremiah 43' (pen.)	Report	Rully 3'; Hita 69'

Manahan, Solo, Central Java
Attendance: 2,154
Referee: Mulyadi (Indonesia)

=== Final ===
25 May 2011
19:00 WIB

Persiba Bantul (C)	1–0	Persiraja Banda Aceh
Wahyu 45'	Report

Manahan, Solo, Central Java
Attendance: 34,898
Referee: Jimmy Napitupulu (Indonesia)

NB: (C) = Champion; (P) = Promoted.

== Champions ==
Champions
Persiba Bantul

== Promotion/relegation play-off ==
23 June 2011
15:30 WIB

Bontang FC (R) Indonesia Super League	2–3	Persidafon Jayapura (O) (P) Liga Indonesia Premier Division
Kenji 12'; Istigfar 65'	Report	Lukas 48'; Cirelli 56' (pen.); P. Wanggai 66'

Kanjuruhan Stadium, Malang Regency, East Java
Attendance: 1,546
Referee: Iis Isya Permana (Indonesia)

NB: (O) = Play-off winner; (P) = Promoted to Indonesia Super League; (R) = Relegated to Indonesian Premier Division.

== Top goal scorers ==
Including matches played on 13 March 2011

Note: players in bold are still active in the competition.

Rank	Scorer	Club	Goals
1	(Nigeria) Udo Fortune	Persiba Bantul	34
2	(Nigeria) Osas Saha	PSAP Sigli	29
3	(Argentina) Franco Hita	Mitra Kukar	21
4	(Indonesia) Patrick Wanggai	Persidafon Jayapura	20
5	(Nigeria) Ernest Jeremiah	Persidafon Jayapura	16
5	(Chile) Cristian Carrasco	Persita Tangerang	16
7	(Argentina) Adrian Trinidad	Persik Kediri	15
7	(Indonesia) M. Agus Salim	Persita Tangerang	15
7	(Argentina) Gaston Castano	PSMS Medan	15
10	(Argentina) Leonardo Veron	Persih Tembilahan	14
10	(Nigeria) Angel Ebus	Persikab Bandung	14
12	(Indonesia) Purwanto	PSBI Blitar	12
13	(Indonesia) Mansyur	Persipasi Bekasi	9
14	(Indonesia) Kornelis Kaimu	Persebaya DU (Bhayangkara)	8
14	(Indonesia) John Pattikawa	Persemalra Maluku Tenggara	8
14	(Nigeria) Peter M. Kuoh	PS Mojokerto Putra	8
