= Beringin Stadium =

Football stadium in Tembilahan, Indonesia

- Location in Riau
- Location: Tembilahan, Indragiri Hilir Regency, Indonesia
- Coordinates: 0°18′31″S 103°09′36″E
- Owner: Indragiri Hilir Regency Government
- Operator: Indragiri Hilir Regency Government
- Capacity: 10,000
- Surface: Grass field

Tenant
- Persih Tembilahan

Beringin Stadium is a football stadium in the town of Tembilahan, Indragiri Hilir Regency, Indonesia. The stadium has a capacity of 10,000 people. It is the home base of Persih Tembilahan.
