= Angga =

Angga may refer to:

- Angga Dwimas Sasongko (born 1985), Indonesian film director
- Angga Pratama (born 1991), Indonesian badminton player
- Angga Febryanto Putra (born 1995), Indonesian professional footballer
- Angga Saputra (born 1993), Indonesian professional footballer
- Gilang Angga (born 1980), Indonesian footballer
- Jaya Teguh Angga (born 1987), Indonesian footballer
- Angga Yunanda (born 2000), Indonesian actor

== See also ==
- Anggun (born 1974), Indonesian female singer
- Anga Kingdom, in the eastern parts of India
- Angga railway station, a station on the Chinese Qingzang Railway
