= Nopendi =

Indonesian footballer

Personal information
- Full name: Nopendi
- Date of birth: 15 November 1986 (age 40)
- Place of birth: Bantul, Indonesia
- Height: 1.75 m (5 ft 9 in)
- Position: Right back

Senior career*
Years	Team	Apps	(Gls)
2004–2013	Persiba Bantul	126	(5)
2014–2015	Persepam Madura United	18	(0)
Total		144	(5)

International career
2005	Indonesia U20		
2012–2013	Indonesia	6	(0)
- * Club domestic league appearances and goals

Nopendi (born 15 November 1986) is a former footballer from Indonesia.

== International career ==
Nopendi receives his first senior international cap against Philippines on 5 June 2012.

Indonesian's goal tally first.

International appearances and goals
#	Date	Venue	Opponent	Result	Competition	Goal
2012
1	5 June	Rizal Memorial Stadium, Manila	Philippines	2–2	Friendly	
2	26 September	Sultan Hassanal Bolkiah Stadium, Bandar Seri Begawan	Brunei	5–0	Friendly	
3	16 October	Mỹ Đình National Stadium, Hanoi	Vietnam	0–0	Friendly	
4	1 December	National Stadium, Bukit Jalil, Kuala Lumpur	Malaysia	0–2	2012 AFF Suzuki Cup	
2013
5	31 January	Amman International Stadium, Amman	Jordan	0–5	Friendly	
6	6 February	Al-Rashid Stadium, Dubai	Iraq	0–1	2015 AFC Asian Cup qualification	

== Honours ==
Persiba Bantul

- Liga Indonesia Premier Division: 2010–11
