= Tempuling Airport =

Tempuling Airport Bandar Udara Tempuling
- IATA: none; ICAO: none

Summary
- Airport type: Civil
- Operator: Government
- Serves: Tembilahan
- Location: Tembilahan, Riau, Indonesia
- Time zone: WIB (UTC+07:00)
- Elevation AMSL: 55 ft (17 m)
- Coordinates: 00°25′14.4″S 102°59′31.9″E

Map
- Location of the airport in Sumatra Tempuling Airport (Indonesia)

Runways
Direction	Length		Surface
Direction	m	ft	Surface
15/33	1,800	5,906	Asphalt

Tempuling Airport (Indonesian: Bandar Udara Tempuling [ˌbandar uˌdara t̪əmˈpuliŋ]) is a domestic airport located at Tembilahan, the capital of Indragiri Hilir Regency, Riau province, Indonesia. It serves Tembilahan and surrounding areas. Currently, this airport only serves flights to and from Pekanbaru. This airport is able to serve mid-sized aircraft such as BAe 146 and ATR 72.

== History ==
The airport construction started in 2006 and finished in 2008. This airport is actually located in Sungai Salak Village, Tempuling District, 24 km from Tembilahan. The runway has been extended from 1,350 metres to 1,800 metres to accommodate larger aircraft than previous, and the airport now is able to accommodate aircraft equivalent to BAe 146 and ATR 72.

A new airport terminal is under construction and was expected to be finished in 2019.

== Airlines and destinations ==
Airlines	Destinations
Susi Air	Pekanbaru

== Statistics ==
Frequency of flights at Tempuling Airport
Rank	Destinations	Frequency (weekly)	Airline(s)
1	Pekanbaru, Riau	1	Susi Air
