= PS PLN NAD =

Indonesian football club in Aceh

- Full name: Persatuan Sepakbola Perusahaan Listrik Negara Nanggroe Aceh Darussalam
- Nickname: The Electricians
- Founded: 2006; 20 years ago
- Ground: Harapan Bangsa Stadium
- Capacity: 18,000
- Owner: State Electricity Company of Banda Aceh
- Coach: Rian Apriliansyah Kautsar
- League: Liga 3
- 2021: Round of 16, (Aceh zone)
Home colours	Away colours

Persatuan Sepakbola Perusahaan Listrik Negara Nanggroe Aceh Darussalam (simply known as PS PLN NAD) is an Indonesian football club based in Banda Aceh, Aceh. They currently compete in the Liga 3 and their homeground is Harapan Bangsa Stadium.

== Players ==
=== Current squad ===
As of 31 August 2021

Note: Flags indicate national team as defined under FIFA eligibility rules; some limited exceptions apply. Players may hold more than one non-FIFA nationality.

No.	Pos.	Nation	Player
1	FW	IDN	Muhammad Rusidy
2	DF	IDN	Begal Munazar
3	DF	IDN	Kaifin Aulia
4	DF	IDN	Iqbal Gano
5	DF	IDN	Nanda
6	MF	IDN	Machraja
7	MF	IDN	Rizki Irwanda
8	FW	IDN	Ricky Wahyudi
9	FW	IDN	Utut Ardiansyah
10	FW	IDN	Fahmi Rinaldi
11	MF	IDN	Habibullah
12	FW	IDN	Yudi Mafira
13	DF	IDN	Windy Andrian
14	DF	IDN	Reza Pahlevi

No.	Pos.	Nation	Player
15	MF	IDN	Ferdi
16	MF	IDN	Muhammad Azwar (Captain)
17	MF	IDN	Ridha Munandar
18	FW	IDN	Adri Fuadi
19	MF	IDN	Nizam Al Hafizh
20	MF	IDN	Assyahrur Radhi Baroena
21	DF	IDN	Rozi Mulia
22	GK	IDN	Teuku Afdhal
29	MF	IDN	Fitra Ramadhan
31	GK	IDN	Muhammad Khalidi
57	GK	IDN	Januar Ramadhan
