= Anda Hendrawan =

Indonesian footballer

Anda
Personal information
- Full name: Anda Hendrawan
- Date of birth: 25 January 1984 (age 42)
- Place of birth: Medan, North Sumatra, Indonesia
- Height: 1.65 m (5 ft 5 in)
- Position: Full-back

Senior career*
Years	Team	Apps	(Gls)
2009–2010	Bontang	23	(0)
2010–2011	Semen Padang	4	(0)
2011–2014	Persiram Raja Ampat	31	(0)
- * Club domestic league appearances and goals as of 11 July 2012

Anda Hendrawan (born January 25, 1984) is an Indonesian former footballer.

== Club statistics ==
Club	Season	Super League		Premier Division		Piala Indonesia		Total	
Club	Season	Apps	Goals	Apps	Goals	Apps	Goals	Apps	Goals
Bontang FC	2009-10	23	0	-		-		23	0
Semen Padang	2010-11	4	0	-		-		4	0
Persiram Raja Ampat	2011-12	4	0	-		-		4	0
Total		31	0	-		-		31	0
