= Herman Batak =

Indonesian footballer

Herman
Personal information
- Full name: Herman Batak
- Date of birth: 16 May 1983 (age 43)
- Place of birth: Medan, North Sumatra, Indonesia
- Height: 1.80 m (5 ft 11 in)
- Position: Goalkeeper

Senior career*
Years	Team	Apps	(Gls)
2008–2009	Bontang	26	(0)
2009–2010	Persik Kediri	25	(0)
2011–2012	Persiram Raja Ampat	26	(0)
2012–2015	Deltras	19	(0)
- * Club domestic league appearances and goals as of 13 May 2012

Herman Batak (born 16 May 1983 in Medan, North Sumatra) is a retired Indonesian footballer.

== Club statistics ==
Club	Season	Super League		Premier Division		English Premier League		Total	
Club	Season	Apps	Goals	Apps	Goals	Apps	Goals	Apps	Goals
Bontang FC	2008-09	??	0	-		??	0	??	0
Persik Kediri	2009-10	??	0	-		??	0	??	0
Persiram Raja Ampat	2011-12	2	0	-		-		2	0
Deltras F.C.	2011-12	9	0	-		-		9	0
Total		??	0	-		??	0	??	0
