= Patrick Ghigani =

German footballer (born 1978)

Personal information
- Full name: Patrick Sofian Ghigani
- Date of birth: 16 March 1978 (age 48)
- Place of birth: Munich, West Germany
- Height: 1.75 m (5 ft 9 in)
- Position: Midfielder

Youth career
- DJK München-Nord
- SpVgg Feldmoching
- TSV Milbertshofen
- –1996: 1860 Munich

Senior career*
Years	Team	Apps	(Gls)
1996–2000	FC Aschheim		
2000–2002	Club Africain		
2002–2003	LR Ahlen	1	(0)
2003–2004	Kickers Emden		
2004–2005	Stade Tunisien		
2005–2007	SpVgg Unterhaching	48	(3)
2007	SpVgg Unterhaching II	1	(0)
2007–2008	SC Pfullendorf	11	(0)
2008–2009	Rodos		
2009–2010	Panargiakos		
2010–2011	Panegialios		
2011–2012	Cenderawasih FC		
2012–2013	Persiraja Banda Aceh		
2013	SpVgg Feldmoching		
2013–	TSV Geiselbullach		

Managerial career
- 2013–: TSV Geiselbullach (player-manager)
- 2018: Persijap Jepara
- TSV Allach
- 2022–?: SV Aubing
- * Club domestic league appearances and goals

Patrick Sofian Ghigani (born 16 March 1978) is a German football manager and former player.

== Playing career ==
Born in Munich, Ghigani began playing senior football with FC Aschheim in the amateur-level Bezirksliga in 1996.

Four years later, Ghigani moved to Tunisia, the country of his ancestry, joining Tunisian Ligue Professionnelle 1 side Club Africain. In his two years there, he won the cup, came second in the league and reached the final of the CAF Champions League, being awarded player of the tournament in the Champions League.

He returned to Germany joining 2. Bundesliga side LR Ahlen for the 2002–03 season, appearing in just one league match due to injuries. After a return spell in the Tunisian first division with Stade Tunisien and a spell with German amateurs Kickers Emden, he returned to the 2. Bundesliga with SpVgg Unterhaching in 2005. In two seasons with Unterhaching he made 48 league appearances scoring three goals. Unterhaching were relegated at the end of the 2006–07 season and he was released. After spending the remainder of 2007 without a club, he dropped down to play in the Regionalliga with SC Pfullendorf, where he stayed for one season.

In January 2009, Ghigani moved to Greece, joining Rodos F.C. in the third division. After helping the club gain promotion, he stayed in the third division by moving to Panargiakos F.C. for the following season. A move to third division side Panegialios followed.

In January 2011 Ghigani signed with Indonesian club Cenderawasih FC, coached by Uwe Erkenbrecher. Ten months later, he joined Persiraja Banda Aceh.

In late 2012, he decided to return to Germany to play amateur football for his youth club SpVgg Feldmoching in the Bezirksliga, having bought a house in Olching. In May it was announced he would become player-manager at TSV Geiselbullach for the 2012–13 season.

== Managerial career ==
In January 2018 Ghigani became head coach at Indonesian club Persijap Jepara.

Ghigani was appointed coach at Bezirksliga side SV Aubing in June 2022, having previously coached TSV Allach.

== Personal life ==
In 2012, after returning to Germany from Indonesia, Ghigani settled in Olching. He has a wife and two children. His younger brother Ennis also played football.
