= Kim Yong-hee (footballer) =

South Korean footballer (born 1978)

Kim Yong-Hee
Personal information
- Full name: Kim Yong-Hee
- Date of birth: 15 October 1978 (age 48)
- Place of birth: South Korea
- Height: 1.75 m (5 ft 9 in)
- Position: Midfielder

Youth career
- Chungang University

Senior career*
Years	Team	Apps	(Gls)
2001–2003	Seongnam Ilhwa Chunma	42	(1)
2004	Busan I'cons	21	(0)
2005–2006	Gwangju Sangmu Bulsajo (Army)	44	(1)
2007	Busan I'Park	2	(0)
2008	Jeonbuk Hyundai Motors	1	(0)
2009	Gangneung City	13	(1)
2009	Incheon Korail	10	(0)
2010–2011	Persiba Balikpapan	26	(1)
2011–2012	Sriwijaya	18	(0)
2012–2013	Arema Indonesia (ISL)	16	(0)
Total		193	(4)
- * Club domestic league appearances and goals

- Kim Yong-hee
- Hangul: 김용희
- Hanja: 金容熙
- RR: Gim Yonghui
- MR: Kim Yonghŭi

Kim Yong-Hee (born 15 October 1978) is a South Korean former football player who last played for Arema Indonesia (ISL) in the Indonesian Super League.

He previously played professionally in the K-League for Jeonbuk Hyundai Motors, Gwangju Sangmu Bulsajo, Busan I'Park and Seongnam Ilhwa Chunma, before first stepping down to the semi-professional National League at the beginning of 2009 by signing for Gangneung City. In mid-2009 he moved to Incheon Korail and spent six months with the club before signing a contract in March 2010 with Indonesian Super League side Persiba Balikpapan.

== Club career statistics ==
Club performance			League		Cup		League Cup		Continental		Total	
Season	Club	League	Apps	Goals	Apps	Goals	Apps	Goals	Apps	Goals	Apps	Goals
South Korea			League		KFA Cup		League Cup		Asia		Total	
2001	Seongnam Ilhwa Chunma	K-League	26	1	?	?	1	0	-			
2002	Seongnam Ilhwa Chunma	K-League	14	0	?	?	4	0	?	?		
2003	Seongnam Ilhwa Chunma	K-League	2	0	1	0	-		?	?		
2004	Busan I'cons	K-League	21	0	0	0	10	0	-		31	0
2005	Gwangju Sangmu Bulsajo	K-League	22	0	0	0	12	1	-		34	1
2006	Gwangju Sangmu Bulsajo	K-League	22	1	1	0	10	2	-		33	3
2007	Busan I'Park	K-League	2	0	0	0	4	0	-		6	0
2008	Jeonbuk Hyundai Motors	K-League	1	0	0	0	0	0	-		1	0
2009	Gangneung City FC	Korea National League	13	1	1	0	-		-		14	1
2009	Incheon Korail	Korea National League	10	0			-		-		10	0
Indonesia			League		Piala Indonesia		League Cup		Asia		Total	
2009–10	Persiba Balikpapan	Indonesia Super League	11	0	0	0	-		-		11	0
2010–11	Persiba Balikpapan	Indonesia Super League	12	0	-		-		-		12	0
2010–11	Sriwijaya	Indonesia Super League	7	0	-		-		-		7	0
2011–12	Arema Indonesia (ISL)	Indonesia Super League	15	0			-		-		15	0
Total	South Korea		133	3			41	3				
Total	Indonesia		45	0	0	0	-		-		45	0
Career total			178	3			41	3				
