= Mulham Arufin =

Indonesian footballer (born 1990)

Personal information
- Full name: Mulham Arufin
- Date of birth: 17 November 1990 (age 35)
- Place of birth: Gresik, Indonesia
- Height: 1.70 m (5 ft 7 in)
- Positions: Forward (football); Anchor (futsal)

Youth career
- 2007–2009: Gresik United

Senior career*
Years	Team	Apps	(Gls)
2010–2014	Gresik United	32	(7)
2015–2019	Bintang Timur Surabaya		
- * Club domestic league appearances and goals

Mulham Arufin (born November 17, 1990) is an Indonesian former footballer and fustal player.

In 2015, he joined Bintang Timur Surabaya in the Indonesia Pro Futsal League.
