= Jeon Sung-ha =

South Korean footballer

Sungha Jeon
Personal information
- Full name: Jeon Sung-Ha
- Date of birth: 6 April 1987 (age 39)
- Place of birth: South Korea
- Height: 1.86 m (6 ft 1 in)
- Position: Forward

Senior career*
Years	Team	Apps	(Gls)
2009–2011	Incheon Korail	34	(11)
2011–2012	Persiram Raja Ampat	10	(0)
2012	PSAP Sigli	5	(0)
- * Club domestic league appearances and goals as of 19:38, 16 May 2012

Jeon Sung-Ha or Sung-Ha Jeon (born April 6, 1987) is a South Korean former football who plays as a forward.
