= Hendra Syahputra =

Indonesian footballer

Personal information
- Full name: Hendra Syahputra
- Date of birth: 1 September 1983 (age 43)
- Place of birth: Bireuen, Indonesia
- Height: 1.70 m (5 ft 7 in)
- Position: Midfielder

Senior career*
Years	Team	Apps	(Gls)
2008–2009	PSSB Bireuen	36	(1)
2009–2010	PSAP Sigli	30	(1)
2010–2011	Persiraja Banda Aceh	29	(1)
2011–2012	PSAP Sigli	23	(0)
2013–2014	PSLS Lhokseumawe	17	(0)
- * Club domestic league appearances and goals as of 11 July 2012

Hendra Syahputra (born September 1, 1983) is an Indonesian former footballer.

== Club statistics ==
Club	Season	Super League		Premier Division		Piala Indonesia		Total	
Club	Season	Apps	Goals	Apps	Goals	Apps	Goals	Apps	Goals
PSAP Sigli	2011-12	9	0	-		-		9	0
Total		9	0	-		-		9	0
