= Arie Supriyatna =

Indonesian footballer (born 1984)

Personal information
- Full name: Arie Supriyatna
- Date of birth: 25 December 1984 (age 41)
- Place of birth: Tangerang, Indonesia
- Height: 1.73 m (5 ft 8 in)
- Position: Striker

Senior career*
Years	Team	Apps	(Gls)
2010–2011	Persipasi Bekasi	??	(8)
2011–2012	PSMS Medan	16	(2)
2012–2014	Persebaya DU	19	(0)
2014–2015	Pusamania Borneo	19	(5)
2016–2017	Persikabo Bogor	28	(5)
- * Club domestic league appearances and goals as of 11 July 2012

Arie Supriyatna (born 25 December 1984) is an Indonesian former footballer who plays as a striker.

== Club statistics ==
Club	Season	Super League		Premier Division		Piala Indonesia		Total	
Club	Season	Apps	Goals	Apps	Goals	Apps	Goals	Apps	Goals
PSMS Medan	2011-12	16	2	-		-		16	2
Total		16	2	-		-		16	2
