= Richard Caceres =

Paraguayan footballer (born 1982)

Personal information
- Full name: Richard Francisco Caceres Benitez
- Date of birth: 3 September 1982 (age 44)
- Place of birth: Asunción, Paraguay
- Height: 1.81 m (5 ft 11 in)
- Position: Midfielder

Senior career*
Years	Team	Apps	(Gls)
2009–2010	Persija Jakarta	6	(0)
2011–2012	Persiba Balikpapan	8	(0)
2013–2014	Persiku Kudus	15	(0)
- * Club domestic league appearances and goals as of 8 June 2013

Richard Francisco Caceres Benitez (born 3 September 1982) is a Paraguayan footballer who last played for Persiba Balikpapan in the Indonesia Super League.
