= Muhammad Sabani =

Indonesian footballer

M. Sabani
Personal information
- Full name: Muhammad Sabani
- Date of birth: 15 October 1977 (age 49)
- Place of birth: Medan, Indonesia
- Height: 1.80 m (5 ft 11 in)
- Position: Goalkeeper

Youth career
- Putra Buana

Senior career*
| Years | Team | Apps | (Gls) |
| 1998–2000 | PSMS Medan | 39 | (0) |
| 2000–2001 | Barito Putera | 23 | (0) |
| 2001–2002 | Petrokimia Putra | 13 | (0) |
| 2003–2004 | Persija Jakarta | 15 | (0) |
| 2005–2006 | Persmin Minahasa | 27 | (0) |
| 2006–2007 | Persijap Jepara | 11 | (0) |
| 2008–2009 | Persiraja Banda Aceh | 20 | (0) |
| 2010–2011 | Persik Kediri | 14 | (0) |
| 2011–2013 | PSAP Sigli | 31 | (0) |

Managerial career
- 2019: PSMS Medan (Goalkeeper coach)
- * Club domestic league appearances and goals as of 11 July 2012

Muhammad Sabani (born October 15, 1977) is an Indonesian professional football coach and former player who plays as a goalkeeper.

== Personal life ==
Sabani is married to Melysa Fitri and has two children, Falah and Balqis. He started his career by joining the Mercu Buana football team in Medan. Before he became a football player, Sabani was a tea courier boy. He delivered tea bottles to the Mercu Buana dormitory and by chance met a local coach who offered to train him as a goal keeper. Before a year had passed, he was accepted as a player in PSMS Medan in 1998.

== Career statistics ==
| Club | liga | Super League | | Premier Division | | Piala Indonesia | | Total | |
| Club | liga | Apps | Goals | Apps | Goals | Apps | Goals | Apps | Goals |
|---|---|---|---|---|---|---|---|---|---|
| PSAP Sigli | 2011-12 | 4 | 0 | - | | - | | 4 | 0 |
| Total | | 4 | 0 | - | | - | | 4 | 0 |
