= Sansan Husaeni =

Indonesian association footballer

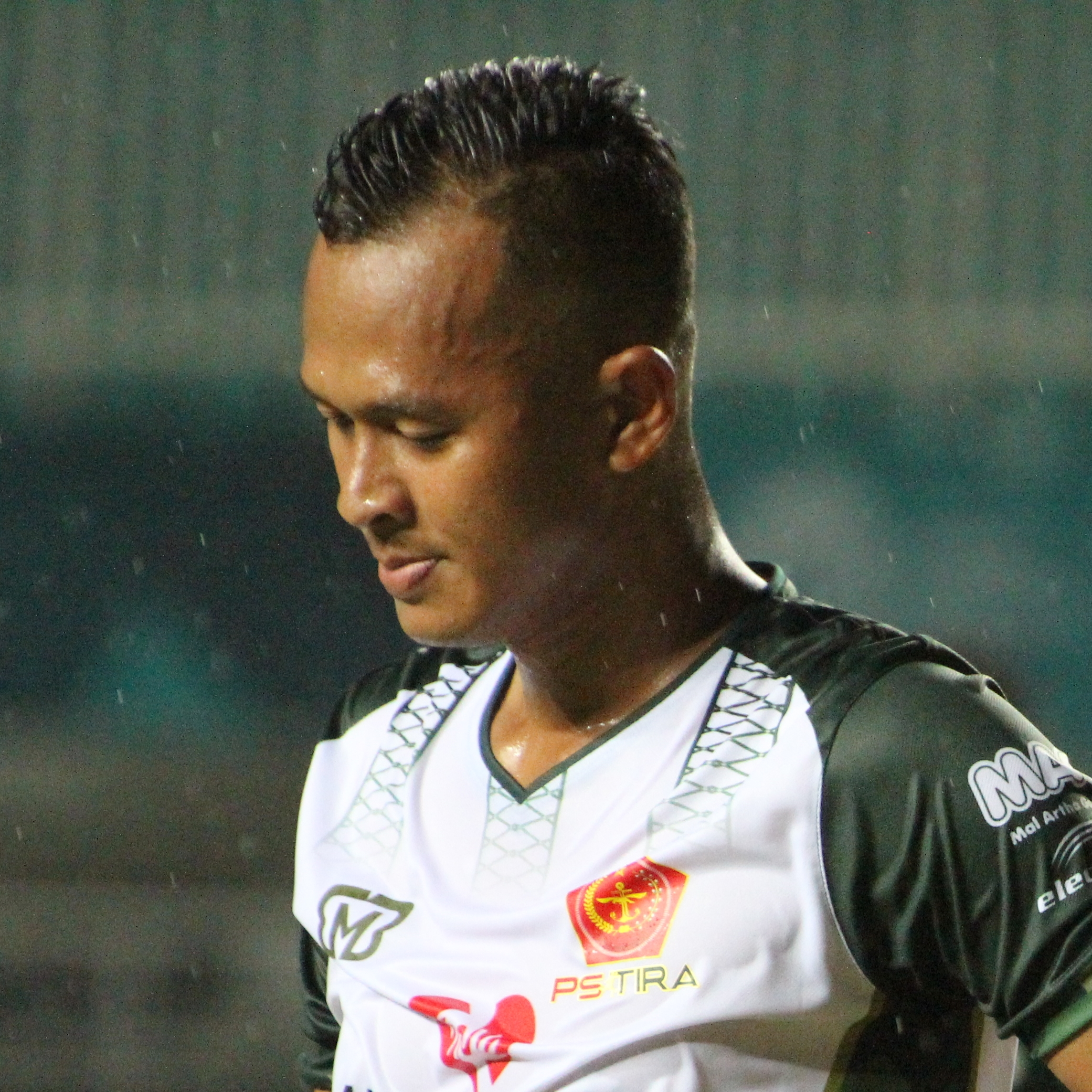
- Sansan playing for PS TIRA in 2018

Personal information
- Full name: Sansan Fauzi Husaeni
- Date of birth: 1 August 1989 (age 37)
- Place of birth: Tasikmalaya, Indonesia
- Height: 1.80 m (5 ft 11 in)
- Position: Striker

Team information
- Current team: Persiba Bantul
- Number: 9

Youth career
- 2008–2009: Persija Jakarta

Senior career*
Years	Team	Apps	(Gls)
2009–2010	Persija Jakarta	6	(0)
2011–2013	Jakarta FC 1928	50	(18)
2014–2015	Persekap Pasuruan	11	(3)
2016	Persikad Depok	2	(0)
2017–2019	TIRA-Persikabo	45	(11)
2020	Persis Solo	0	(0)
2021	Madura United	6	(0)
2021	RANS Cilegon	4	(0)
2022	Persipura Jayapura	5	(1)
2023–2024	Nusantara United	12	(2)
2024–2025	Persikab Bandung	17	(4)
2025–	Persiba Bantul	11	(2)
- * Club domestic league appearances and goals as of 25 January 2026

Sansan Fauzi Husaeni (born 1 August 1989) is an Indonesian professional footballer who plays as a striker for Liga Nusantara club Persiba Bantul.

== Club career ==
=== TIRA-Persikabo ===
In 2017, Sansan signed a year contract with TIRA-Persikabo. He made his debut on 27 May 2017 in a match against Persela Lamongan in the Liga 1. On 27 May 2017, Sansan scored his first goal for PS TNI against Persela Lamongan in the 53rd minute at the Pakansari Stadium, Bogor.

=== Persis Solo ===
He was signed for Persis Solo to play in Liga 2 in the 2020 season. This season was suspended on 27 March 2020 due to the COVID-19 pandemic. The season was abandoned and was declared void on 20 January 2021.

=== Madura United ===
In 2021, Sansan signed a contract with Indonesian Liga 1 club Madura United. He made his debut on 16 October 2021 in a match against Persela Lamongan at the Maguwoharjo Stadium, Sleman.

=== RANS Cilegon ===
He was signed for RANS Cilegon to play in the second round of Liga 2 in the 2021 season. Sansan made his debut on 15 December 2021 in a match against Persis Solo at the Pakansari Stadium, Cibinong.

== Honours ==
=== Club ===
RANS Cilegon

- Liga 2 runner-up: 2021
