= Udo Fortune =

Nigerian professional footballer

Personal information
- Date of birth: 2 February 1988 (age 38)
- Place of birth: Warri, Nigeria
- Height: 1.87 m (6 ft 1 1/2 in)
- Position: Striker

Senior career*
Years	Team	Apps	(Gls)
2007	Balestier Khalsa	17	(0)
2008	Negeri Sembilan	20	(7)
2009–2010	Persema Malang	12	(4)
2010–2011	Persikabo Bogor	18	(9)
2011	Persiba Bantul	12	(2)
2011–2012	Becamex Bình Dương	23	(2)
2012–2013	Hapoel Nir Ramat HaSharon	11	(1)
2014	Persib Bandung	7	(0)
2014–2015	Persik Kediri	10	(4)
2015–2016	Mosta	12	(2)
2016–2017	Đồng Tháp	28	(6)
Total		170	(37)
- * Club domestic league appearances and goals

Udo Fortune (born 2 February 1988) is a Nigerian former footballer who played as a striker.

== Career ==
Born in Warri, Fortune has played for Becamex Bình Dương, Hapoel Nir Ramat HaSharon, Bali United, Persik Kediri, Mosta and Đồng Tháp.

== Honours ==
Persiba Bantul

- Liga Indonesia Premier Division: 2010–11

Individual

- Liga Indonesia Premier Division Top Goalscorer: 2010–11
