= Amiruddin =

Amiruddin is both a given name and a surname or patronymic. People with the name include:

== Given name ==
- Amiruddin Ahmad (1895 - after 1956), Bengali politician and jurist

== Surname or patronymic ==
- Ahmad Amiruddin (born 1982), Indonesian footballer
- Mohd Afif Amiruddin (born 1984), Malaysian footballer
- Nuku Muhammad Amiruddin (1738–1805), sultan of Tidore and a National Hero of Indonesia
- Teguh Amiruddin (born 1993), Indonesian footballer
