= Sutikno =

Indonesian footballer

Personal information
- Date of birth: 23 March 1985 (age 41)
- Place of birth: Balikpapan, Indonesia
- Height: 1.65 m (5 ft 5 in)
- Positions: Left-back; winger

Senior career*
Years	Team	Apps	(Gls)
2005	Persebaya Surabaya		
2006–2007	PSIR Rembang		
2008–2009	Mitra Kukar		(1)
2009–2010	Persitara North Jakarta	27	(2)
2010–2011	Deltras Sidoarjo	22	(0)
2011–2012	Persiba Balikpapan	3	(0)
2012–2013	Arema Indonesia	6	(0)
2014–2015	Pusamania Borneo	12	(0)
- * Club domestic league appearances and goals

Sutikno (born 23 March 1985) is an Indonesian former footballer.
