= Mujib Riduan =

Indonesian footballer

M. Riduan
Personal information
- Full name: Mujib Riduan
- Date of birth: 15 July 1983 (age 43)
- Place of birth: Indonesia
- Height: 1.70 m (5 ft 7 in)
- Position: Defender

Senior career*
| Years | Team | Apps | (Gls) |
| 2008−2009 | Mitra Kukar | 21 | (0) |
| 2009−2011 | Deltras Sidoarjo | 32 | (1) |
| 2011−2012 | Gresik United | 9 | (0) |
| 2014−2015 | Pusamania Borneo | 5 | (0) |
| 2016 | Gresik United | 0 | (0) |
- * Club domestic league appearances and goals as of 22:39, 28 October 2014 (UTC)

Mujib Riduan (born July 15, 1983) is an Indonesian former footballer who plays as a defender.
