= Defri Rizki =

Indonesian footballer

Personal information
- Full name: Defri Rizki
- Date of birth: 10 December 1988 (age 37)
- Place of birth: Takengon, Indonesia
- Height: 1.60 m (5 ft 3 in)
- Positions: Winger; attacking midfielder

Senior career*
Years	Team	Apps	(Gls)
2008	Persiraja Banda Aceh	22	(1)
2009	Persikabo Bogor	17	(3)
2010	Persih Tembilahan	21	(1)
2011–2012	Persiraja Banda Aceh	29	(1)
2013–2014	Persija Jakarta	39	(0)
2015–2016	Mitra Kukar	24	(5)
2016–2017	Semen Padang	15	(0)
2017	PSPS Pekanbaru	14	(3)
2018–2022	Persiraja Banda Aceh	69	(12)
2022–2023	RANS Nusantara	14	(0)
2023	PSMS Medan	1	(0)
2023–2024	Persiraja Banda Aceh	7	(1)
2024–2025	PSGC Ciamis	18	(0)
- * Club domestic league appearances and goals as of 27 February 2025

Defri Rizki (born 10 December 1988) is an Indonesian professional footballer who plays as a winger or attacking midfielder. Previously, he has played for Persija Jakarta, Semen Padang, Mitra Kukar and PSPS Pekanbaru. He was born in Takengon.

== Club career ==
He previously played for Persiraja Banda Aceh. On January 5, 2013, he signed with Persija Jakarta. On November 12, 2014, he signed a pre-contract with Barito Putera but later decided to sign a contract with Mitra Kukar. In February 2016 he signed a one-year contract with Semen Padang FC. In 2018, he rejoined his former club Persiraja Banda Aceh to play in Liga 2.

== Honours ==
=== Club ===
Mitra Kukar

- General Sudirman Cup: 2015

Persiraja Banda Aceh

- Liga 2 third place (play-offs): 2019
