= Reza Fandi =

Indonesian footballer

Personal information
- Full name: Reza Fandi
- Date of birth: 15 October 1987 (age 39)
- Place of birth: Sigli, Pidie Regency, Aceh, Indonesia
- Height: 1.70 m (5 ft 7 in)
- Position: Midfielder

Youth career
- 2005–2008: PS PT. PLN Aceh

Senior career*
| Years | Team | Apps | (Gls) |
| 2008–2014 | PSAP Sigli | 32 | (1) |
| 2016–2017 | PS Pidie Jaya | | |
| 2018 | Aceh United | 1 | |
- * Club domestic league appearances and goals as of 31 May 2018

Reza Fandi (born October 15, 1987, in Sigli) is an Indonesian former footballer. Previously, he played for PSAP Sigli in the Indonesia Super League, PS Pidie Jaya, and Aceh United.

== Club statistics ==
| Club | Season | Super League | | Premier Division | | Piala Indonesia | | Total | |
| Club | Season | Apps | Goals | Apps | Goals | Apps | Goals | Apps | Goals |
|---|---|---|---|---|---|---|---|---|---|
| PSAP Sigli | 2011-12 | 32 | 1 | - | | - | | 32 | 1 |
| Total | | 32 | 1 | - | | - | | 32 | 1 |
