= Harapan Bangsa Stadium =

Stadium in Banda Aceh, Aceh, Indonesia

- SHB
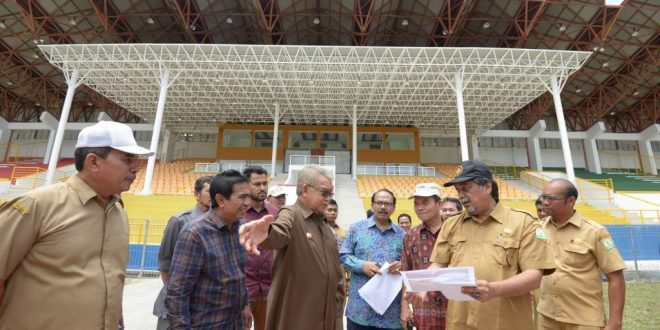

- Location in Aceh, Northern Sumatra, Sumatra and Indonesia Harapan Bangsa Stadium (Northern Sumatra) Harapan Bangsa Stadium (Sumatra) Harapan Bangsa Stadium (Indonesia)
- Former names: Banda Aceh Main Stadium
- Location: Banda Aceh, Aceh, Indonesia
- Coordinates: 05°31′21″N 95°19′25″E
- Owner: Government of Aceh
- Capacity: 18,000
- Surface: Grass pitch Track
- Field size: 109 m x 64 m

Construction
- Groundbreaking: 1 February 1991
- Built: 3 February 1991 – 26 December 1996
- Opened: 1 January 1997; 29 years ago
- Renovated: 2006,2023–
- Expanded: 2008
- Cost: Rp 3,829,345,987

Tenants
- Persiraja Banda Aceh; PS PLN NAD

Harapan Bangsa Stadium or Lhong Raya Stadium is a multi-use stadium in Banda Aceh, Aceh, Indonesia. It is currently used mostly for football matches. The stadium has an all-seated capacity of 18,000.

== International Match ==
=== 2017 Aceh World Solidarity Tsunami Cup ===
Date	Team #1	Score	Team #2
2 December 2017	Kyrgyzstan	3–0	Mongolia
2 December 2017	Indonesia	4–0	Brunei
4 December 2017	Brunei	0–4	Kyrgyzstan
4 December 2017	Mongolia	2–3	Indonesia
6 December 2017	Mongolia	canceled	Brunei
6 December 2017	Kyrgyzstan	1–0	Indonesia

== See also ==
- List of stadiums in Indonesia
- List of stadiums by capacity
