= Indragiri Hilir Regency =

Regency in Riau, Indonesia

Coordinates: 0°20′00″S 103°10′01″E

Indragiri Hilir Regency Kabupaten Indragiri Hilir
- Regency
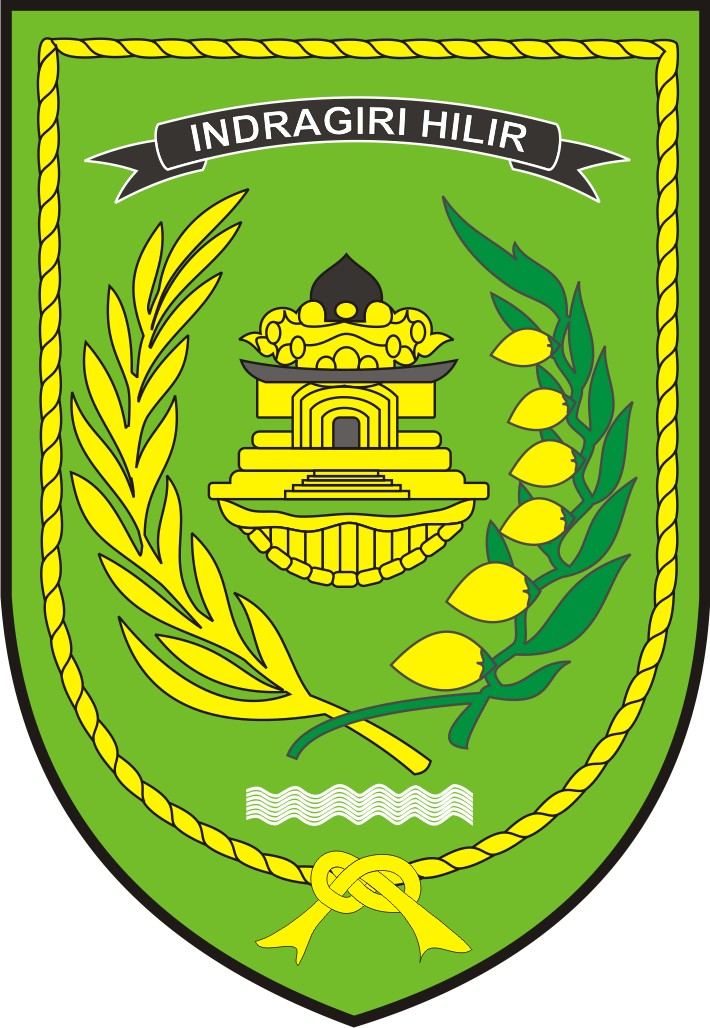
- Coat of arms
- Motto(s): Berlayar sampai ke Pulau, Berjalan sampai ke Batas
- Country: Indonesia
- Province: Riau
- Regency seat: Tembilahan

Government
  - Regent: Herman
  - Vice Regent: Yuliantini

Area
  - Total: 13,136.14 km^{2} (5,071.89 sq mi)

Population (mid 2025 estimate)
  - Total: 731,374
  - Density: 55.6765/km^{2} (144.201/sq mi)
- Time zone: UTC+7 (WIB)
- Website: www.inhilkab.go.id

Indragiri Hilir (or Lower Indragiri) is the most eastern regency (kabupaten) of Riau Province, Indonesia. It is located on the island of Sumatra. The regency has an area of 13,136.14 km^{2} and had a population of 661,779 at the 2010 census and 654,909 at the 2020 Census; the official estimate as at mid 2025 was 731,374 (comprising 376,749 males and 354,625 females). The administrative centre of the regency is the town of Tembilahan.

== Administrative districts ==
The regency is divided into twenty districts (kecamatan), listed below with their areas and their populations at the 2010 census and the 2020 census, together with the official estimates as at mid 2025. The table also includes the locations of the district administrative centres, the number of administrative villages in each district (totaling 197 rural desa and 39 urban kelurahan), and its post code.

Kode Wilayah	Name of District (kecamatan)	Area in km^{2}	Pop'n census 2010	Pop'n census 2020	Pop'n estimate mid 2025	Admin centre	No. of desa	No. of kelurahan	Post code
14.04.09	Keritang	898.53	61,420	63,103	71,026	Kotabaru Reteh	16	1	29275
14.04.14	Kemuning	901.90	29,647	38,499	46,771	Selensen	11	1	29274
14.04.01	Reteh	500.69	42,213	35,974	37,448	Pulau Kijang	11	3	29273
14.04.20	Sungai Batang	328.09	11,837	10,066	10,662	Benteng	7	1	29270
14.04.02	Enok	530.23	32,987	33,846	37,213	Enok	10	4	29272
14.04.10	Tanah Merah	470.57	29,820	25,236	26,920	Kuala Enok	9	1	29271
14.04.03	Kuala Indragiri	696.29	18,733	14,679	16,845	Sapat	7	1	29280
14.04.18	Concong	266.71	12,852	11,764	12,254	Concong Luar	5	1	29281
14.04.04	Tembilahan	162.14	69,498	77,862	86,705	Tembilahan Hilir	-	8 ^{(a)}	29211, 29212 and 29214
14.04.13	Tembilahan Hulu	127.52	42,675	46,662	52,886	Tembilahan Hulu	4	2	29213
14.04.05	Tempuling	553.47	29,584	31,633	36,780	Sungai Salak	5	4	29262
14.04.19	Kempas	596.50	32,641	38,671	42,888	Harapan Tani	10	2	29261
14.04.11	Batang Tuaka	421.23	26,412	27,190	31,325	Sungai Piring	12	1	29252
14.04.06	Gaung Anak Serka	621.14	21,252	22,591	25,195	Teluk Pinang	9	3	29253
14.04.12	Gaung	2,182.80	38,573	38,367	45,377	Kuala Lahang	15	1	29282
14.04.07	Mandah	857.14	38,247	34,531	40,466	Khairiah Mandah	16	1	29254
14.04.08	Kateman	563.16	43,783	39,284	46,116	Tagaraja	8	3	29255
14.04.15	Pelangiran	1,351.26	41,918	35,318	34,004	Pelangiran	15	1	29257
14.04.16	Teluk Balengkong	575.26	16,126	9,229	9,326	Saka Rotan	13	-	29258
14.02.17	Pulau Burung	531.49	21,561	20,404	21,167	Pulau Burung	14	-	29256
	Totals	13,136.14	661,779	654,909	731,374	Tembilahan	197	39	

Note: (a) comprising the 8 kelurahan of Pekan Arba, Seberang Tembilahan, Sungai Beringin, Sungai Perak, Tembilahan Hilir, Tembilahan Kota, Seberang Tembilahan Barat and Seberang Tembilahan Selatan.

== Airports ==
The only public airport in Indragiri Hilir is Tempuling Airport. There is also a private airport located in Pelangiran District owned by PT THIP.
