= Gilang Angga =

Indonesian footballer

Gilang Angga Kusuma
Personal information
- Full name: Gilang Angga Kusuma
- Date of birth: 13 September 1980 (age 46)
- Place of birth: Bandung, Indonesia
- Height: 1.72 m (5 ft 7 1/2 in)
- Positions: Winger; full-back

Youth career
- Citra Raya
- Swasco

Senior career*
Years	Team	Apps	(Gls)
2002	Persikab Bandung	16	(1)
2002–2011	Persib Bandung	123	(1)
2011–2012	Persiraja Banda Aceh	19	(1)
2012–2013	Persela Lamongan	9	(0)
2013–2014	Persita Tangerang	15	(0)
2015–2017	Persika Karawang	4	(0)
Total		186	(3)

International career
2005–2007	Indonesia	2	(0)
- * Club domestic league appearances and goals

Gilang Angga Kusuma is an Indonesian former footballer who plays as a winger, or full-back. His natural position is a midfielder. He stands at 172 cm.

== Club career ==
He was contracted by Persib in 2002. he successfully became part of the senior squad. He scored his first goal when Persib played against Deltras.
