= Mukhlis Nakata =

Indonesian footballer

Personal information
- Full name: Mukhlis Nakata
- Date of birth: 12 May 1988 (age 38)
- Place of birth: Aceh Besar, Indonesia
- Height: 1.65 m (5 ft 5 in)
- Position: Midfielder

Youth career
- 2007–2008: Persiraja Banda Aceh

Senior career*
Years	Team	Apps	(Gls)
2009–2025	Persiraja Banda Aceh	111	(1)
- * Club domestic league appearances and goals

Mukhlis Nakata is an Indonesian former footballer who played as a midfielder. He played his whole career for Persiraja Banda Aceh. He was also the captain for the team from 2016 to his retirement in 2025.

== Club career ==
=== Persiraja Banda Aceh ===
Mukhlis spent his whole football career at Persiraja. He started playing for the senior team as a winger in Liga Indonesia Premier Division for 2008-09 season. The following season, he played on a regular basis under the head coach Herry Kiswanto, and helped Persiraja win the promotion to Indonesian Premier League, the highest tier in Indonesian League at that time.

In 2011-12 Indonesian Premier League opening game versus Persija Jakarta, he came in from the bench substituting Defri Rizky. He established himself in regular first team and was featured in several games, such as when Persiraja defeated Persibo Bojonegoro 1–0. Persiraja finished 7th (out of 12 teams) this season.

In 2013 Indonesian Premier League, he played regularly for Persiraja. However, Persiraja were relegated this season, as they only finished 5th in the play-off round and did not qualify to Indonesian Super League (note: 2013 was the last season of Indonesian Premier League played as the highest tier league, before merged with Indonesian Super League in the following season). And ever since, he played for Persiraja in the second-tier league.

Mukhlis helped Persiraja promoted to 2020 Liga 1, winning the third place play-off against Sriwijaya FC. After a 15-year long career, he decided to retire from football in the middle of the 2024–25 Liga 2 season. This made him among one-club men in football. He played his final match against Dejan FC on 5 January 2025, subbed on for Rizky Nasution on 84th minute.

== Honours ==
Persiraja Banda Aceh

- Liga Indonesia Premier Division runner-up: 2010–11
- Liga 2 third place (play-offs): 2019
