= Mfundo Cecil Mathonsi =

South African soccer player

Mfundo Cecil
Personal information
- Full name: Mfundo Cecil Mathonsi
- Date of birth: 27 July 1982 (age 44)
- Place of birth: Durban, South Africa
- Height: 1.72 m (5 ft 8 in)
- Position: Midfielder

Senior career*
Years	Team	Apps	(Gls)
2000–2002	Ajax Cape Town		
2002–2003	Altay	20	(3)
2003–2005	Ajax Cape Town		
2005–2007	Lamontville Golden Arrows		
2007–2009	Maritzburg Classic		
2009–2010	Persiram Raja Ampat	25	(3)
2010–2011	Persita Tangerang	23	(2)
2011–2012	PSAP Sigli	18	(1)
- * Club domestic league appearances and goals as of 15:28, 30 March 2012 (UTC)

Mfundo Cecil Mathonsi (born 27 July 1982) is a South African former soccer player who played as a striker.

== Career ==
Mathonsi began playing football with Ajax Cape Town. He signed with Turkish side Altay in August 2002, but only appeared for the reserve team before returning to South Africa in March 2003. He would play for Lamontville Golden Arrows and Maritzburg Classic in the Premier Soccer League.

Mathonsi moved to Indonesia in 2009, helping Persiram Raja Ampat win their group in the second division.
