= Abdul Musawir =

Indonesian footballer (born 1984)

Personal information
- Full name: Abdul Musawir
- Date of birth: 18 May 1984 (age 42)
- Place of birth: Banda Aceh, Indonesia
- Height: 1.67 m (5 ft 5 1/2 in)
- Position: Winger

Senior career*
Years	Team	Apps	(Gls)
2003–2004	Persiraja Banda Aceh	15	(10)
2005	PSIM Yogyakarta	5	(1)
2006–2018	Persiraja Banda Aceh	218	(77)
Total		238	(88)
- * Club domestic league appearances and goals

Abdul Musawir (born 18 May 1984) is an Indonesian former footballer.

== Honours ==
Persiraja Banda Aceh

- Liga Indonesia Premier Division runner-up: 2010–11
