= Ernest Jeremiah Chukwuma =

Nigerian footballer (born 1985)

Ernest Jeremiah
Personal information
- Full name: Ernest Jeremiah Chukwuma
- Date of birth: 29 August 1985 (age 41)
- Place of birth: Warri, Nigeria
- Height: 1.81 m (5 ft 11 1/2 in)
- Position: Forward

Senior career*
Years	Team	Apps	(Gls)
2004–2005	East Bengal		
2005–2006	Sporting Clube de Goa		
2006–2007	Eveready Association		
2007–2009	Persipura Jayapura		
2009–2010	Hangzhou Greentown		
2010–2011	Persidafon Dafonsoro		
2012	Persiba Bantul		
- * Club domestic league appearances and goals

Ernest Jeremiah Chukwuma (born 29 August 1985) is a Nigerian retired footballer who played as a forward. He scored a hat-trick on his debut for East Bengal in 2004 vs Sporting Clube de Goa. He has played for Persipura Jayapura and Persidafon Dafonsoro after playing for Super Hangzhou Greentown. In 2012, he returned to Indonesia and played for Persiba Bantul in the Indonesian Premier League.

== Honours ==
Persipura Jayapura

- Copa Indonesia runner-up: 2007–08, 2008–09
