= Wahyu Wijiastanto =

Indonesian footballer

Personal information
- Full name: Wahyu Wijiastanto
- Date of birth: 31 May 1986 (age 40)
- Place of birth: Karanganyar, Indonesia
- Height: 1.93 m (6 ft 4 in)
- Position: Centre-back

Youth career
- 2002–2003: Diklat Salatiga
- 2004–2005: Persijap Jepara

Senior career*
Years	Team	Apps	(Gls)
2005−2006	Persijap Jepara	15	(0)
2006–2009	Persis Solo	48	(1)
2009–2012	Persiba Bantul	76	(3)
2012–2014	Semen Padang	35	(1)
2014–2015	Persiba Bantul	8	(0)
2016	Kalteng Putra	9	(0)
2017	Persip Pekalongan	6	(0)
2021–2022	PSISa Salatiga	5	(0)
Total		197	(5)

International career
2006–2007	Indonesia U23	6	(0)
2011–2013	Indonesia	15	(0)
- * Club domestic league appearances and goals

Wahyu Wijiastanto is an Indonesian former footballer. He played for Indonesia U23 in the Asian Games with Ahmad Bustomi, Tony Sucipto, Zulkifli Syukur, Fandy Mochtar, and Irfan Bachdim.

== International career ==
Wahyu Wijiastanto received his first senior international cap against Saudi Arabia national football team on 7 October 2011. He represented Indonesia in 2014 World Cup qualifying.

Indonesian's goal tally first.

International appearances and goals
#	Date	Venue	Opponent	Result	Competition	Goal
2011
1	7 October	Shah Alam Stadium, Selangor	Saudi Arabia	0–0	Friendly	
2	15 November	Gelora Bung Karno Stadium, Jakarta	Iran	1–4	2014 FIFA World Cup qualification	
2012
3	29 February	Bahrain National Stadium, Riffa	Bahrain	0–10	2014 FIFA World Cup qualification	
4	17 May	Nablus Football Stadium, Nablus	Mauritania	0–2	Friendly	
5	22 May	Hussein Bin Ali Stadium, Hebron	Palestine	1–2	Friendly	
6	10 September	Gelora Bung Karno Stadium, Jakarta	North Korea	0–2	SCTV Cup	
7	15 September	Gelora Bung Tomo Stadium, Surabaya	Vietnam	0–0	Friendly	
8	26 September	Hassanal Bolkiah National Stadium, Bandar Seri Begawan	Brunei	5–0	Friendly	
9	16 October	Mỹ Đình National Stadium, Hanoi	Vietnam	0–0	Friendly	
10	14 November	Gelora Bung Karno Stadium, Jakarta	Timor-Leste	1–0	Friendly	
11	16 November	Gelora Bung Karno Stadium, Jakarta	Cameroon	0–0	Friendly	
12	25 November	Bukit Jalil National Stadium, Kuala Lumpur	Laos	2–2	2012 AFF Suzuki Cup	
13	28 November	National Stadium, Bukit Jalil, Kuala Lumpur	Singapore	1–0	2012 AFF Suzuki Cup	
2013
14	31 January	Amman International Stadium, Amman	Jordan	0–5	Friendly	
15	6 February	Al-Rashid Stadium, Dubai	Iraq	0–1	2015 AFC Asian Cup qualification	

== Honours ==
Persiba Bantul

- Liga Indonesia Premier Division: 2010–11

Semen Padang

- Indonesian Community Shield: 2013

Individual

- Liga Indonesia Premier Division Best Player: 2010–11
