= Tembilahan =

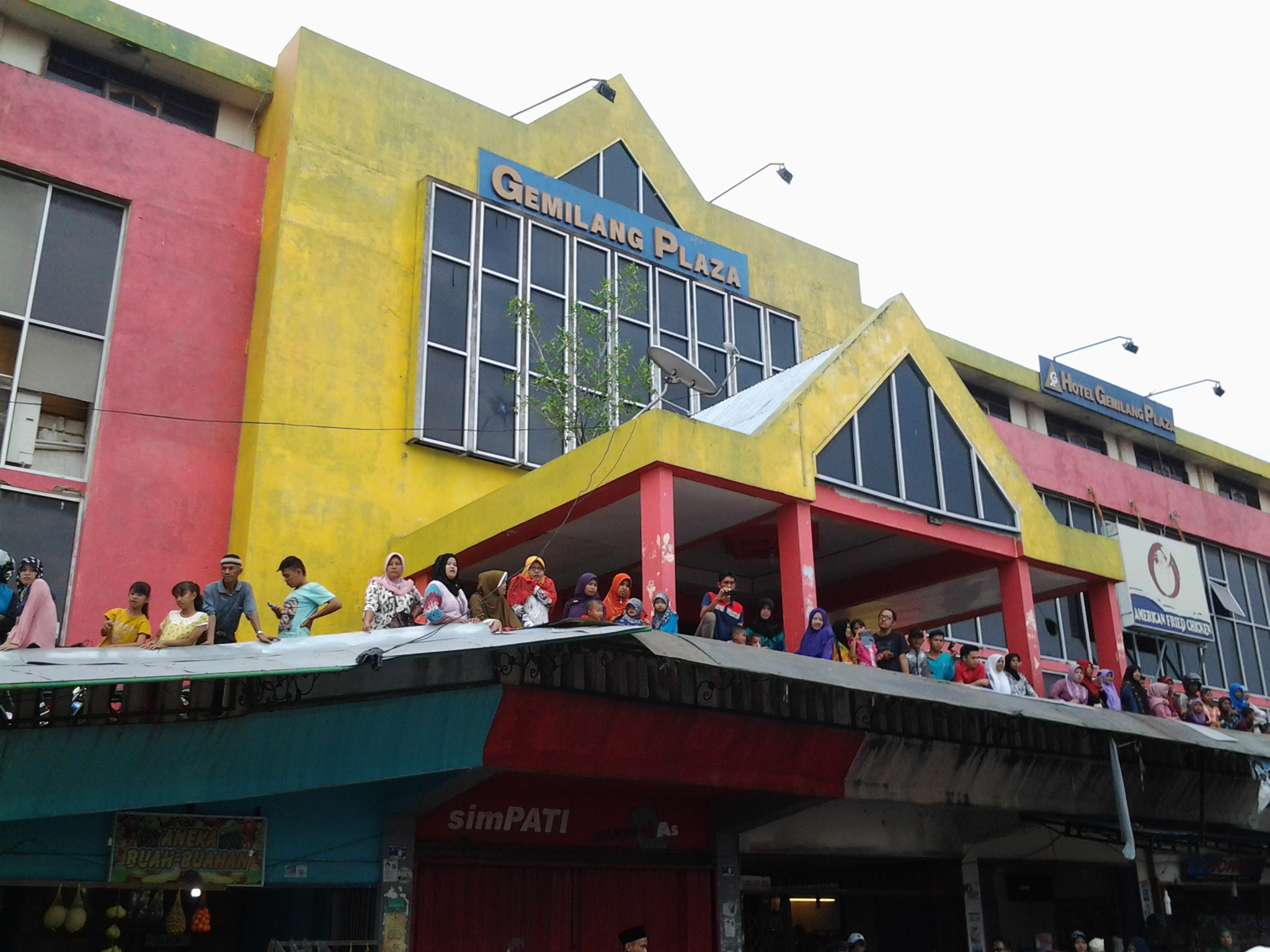
Gemilang Plaza in Tembilahan

Tembilahan (Indonesian: تمبيلاهن; [t̪əmbiˈlahan]) is a town and district of Indragiri Hilir Regency, in the Riau province of Indonesia. It is also the capital of the regency. Tembilahan District has an area of 162.14 square kilometres (62.60 sq mi), consisting of 8 villages (all classed as urban kelurahan). Tembilahan's population at the 2020 Census was 77,862, rising to 86,705 according to the official estimates for mid 2025.

== Town overview ==
The 8 urban villages (kelurahan) which comprise Tembilahan are:

- Pekan Arba
- Seberang Tembilahan
- Sungai Beringin
- Sungai Perak
- Tembilahan Hilir
- Tembilahan Kota
- Seberang Tembilahan Barat
- Seberang Tembilahan Selatan

The districts (kecamatan) surrounding Tembilahan include:

- Batang Tuaka to the north
- Kuala Indragiri and Tanah Merah to the east
- Enok to the south
- Tembilahan Hulu (Upper Tembilahan) and Batang Tuaka to the west

== Geographics ==
The soil conditions of the area is mostly composed of peat soil and stream sediment and marshes. The altitude of the District's Government's Centre is from 1 to 4 metres (3 to 13 ft). On the banks of the rivers and in the estuaries trenches there are many plants that grow, such as Nipah trees.

Because this district is an area of peat soil, the area is classified as having a wet tropical climate. The number of rainy days in this area (which has an average height of 2.5 metres (8.2 ft) above sea level) reached the highest rainfall in the month of March 1999, namely 11 days, with the lowest figure being in June 1999 which is 4 days.

== Climate ==
Tembilahan has a tropical rainforest climate (Af) with heavy rainfall year-round.

Climate data for Tembilahan
Month	Jan	Feb	Mar	Apr	May	Jun	Jul	Aug	Sep	Oct	Nov	Dec	Year
Mean daily maximum °C (°F)	30.0 (86.0)	30.5 (86.9)	31.2 (88.2)	31.4 (88.5)	31.7 (89.1)	31.4 (88.5)	31.2 (88.2)	31.1 (88.0)	31.2 (88.2)	31.2 (88.2)	30.9 (87.6)	30.3 (86.5)	31.0 (87.8)
Daily mean °C (°F)	26.2 (79.2)	26.4 (79.5)	27.0 (80.6)	27.2 (81.0)	27.4 (81.3)	27.1 (80.8)	26.9 (80.4)	26.7 (80.1)	26.9 (80.4)	26.8 (80.2)	26.7 (80.1)	26.4 (79.5)	26.8 (80.3)
Mean daily minimum °C (°F)	22.4 (72.3)	22.4 (72.3)	22.8 (73.0)	23.0 (73.4)	23.1 (73.6)	22.9 (73.2)	22.6 (72.7)	22.4 (72.3)	22.6 (72.7)	22.5 (72.5)	22.5 (72.5)	22.5 (72.5)	22.6 (72.8)
Average rainfall mm (inches)	243 (9.6)	193 (7.6)	212 (8.3)	223 (8.8)	187 (7.4)	132 (5.2)	121 (4.8)	144 (5.7)	167 (6.6)	203 (8.0)	247 (9.7)	233 (9.2)	2,305 (90.9)
Source: Climate-Data.org

== Demographics ==
The residents of Tembilahan district consist of various ethnic groups such as Banjarese, who are the majority in Tembilahan, Bugis, Malays, Minang, Javanese, and Batak as well as residents of Chinese descent. The main livelihood of Tembilahan District's residents are in the agricultural sector.

== Transportation ==
Tempuling Airport is located in Tempuling District, which serves Tembilahan and surrounding areas. Currently, this airport only serves by Susi Air for flights to and from Pekanbaru.

Tembilahan is also served by roads that connect Tembilahan to all major cities and towns in Sumatra, such as Pekanbaru, Rengat, Jambi, and others. Tembilahan is also served by a seaport that connects Tembilahan to Batam and other cities and towns in Indonesia.
