= Abdoulaye Djibril Diallo =

Guinean footballer

Diallo Abdoulaye Djibril
Personal information
- Full name: Diallo Abdoulaye Djibril
- Date of birth: 27 March 1983 (age 43)
- Place of birth: Guinea
- Height: 1.74 m (5 ft 8 1/2 in)
- Position: Midfielder

Senior career*
Years	Team	Apps	(Gls)
2000–2003	Gombak United	55	(2)
2003–2006	PSIS Semarang	100	(6)
2007–2008	Semen Padang	29	(4)
2008	Persiraja Banda Aceh	6	(1)
2008–2010	Sengkang Punggol	70	(29)
2010–2012	Persiraja Banda Aceh	10	(2)
2013–2018	Melbourne Knights	67	(9)
Total		337	(53)
- * Club domestic league appearances and goals

Diallo Abdoulaye Djibril (born 27 March 1983) is a Guinean former footballer who plays as a midfielder.

== Honours ==
Persiraja Banda Aceh

- Liga Indonesia Premier Division runner-up: 2010–11
