= Persih Tembilahan =

Indonesian football club

- Full name: Persatuan Sepakbola Indragiri Hilir
- Nicknames: Harimau Rawa (Swamp Tigers)
- Founded: 1970; 56 years ago, as Persih Tembilahan; 2018; 8 years ago, as Masurai Football Club
- Ground: Beringin Stadium; Tembilahan, Indragiri Hilir Regency, Riau
- Capacity: 10,000
- Owner: Indragiri Hilir Regency Government
- Chairman: Indra Muchlis Adnan
- Head coach: Mundari Karya
- League: Liga 4
- 2017: Liga 2, 7th in Group 1 (Relegated)
Home colours	Away colours

Persatuan Sepakbola Indragiri Hilir, commonly known as Persih Tembilahan or simply known as Persih, is an Indonesian football club based in Tembilahan, Indragiri Hilir Regency, Riau. They are competing in Liga 4 and use Beringin Stadium as their home ground.

== History ==
Persih Tembilahan this as a debutant club that was lucky, because it began competing in Third Division in 2005 and every year the competition successful promotion. Persih finally play in First Division in 2007, and entered the Premier Division in 2008.

This success is attributed to Indra Muchlis Adnan, the Regent of Indragiri Hilir Regency, together with the regional officials of Indragiri Hilir, who continue to vouch for the survival of Persih Tembilahan in the Indonesian football league system.

In 2018, a businessman from Merangin in Jambi, Harmaini, bought the license of Persih Tembilahan and changed its name to Masurai Football Club which is based in Merangin Regency. In the 2018 Liga 3 season, they used the name Persih Masurai (instead of Masurai Football Club) in the competition.

In 2025, there was talk of reviving Persih Tembilahan to compete in the Liga 4 Riau zone. Therefore, Riau football figures are conducting a review phase to determine whether to retain the name Persih Tembilahan or adopt a new name.
