= Luis Peña (footballer) =

Chilean footballer (born 1979)

Personal information
- Full name: Luis Alejandro Peña Sanhueza
- Date of birth: 30 June 1979 (age 47)
- Place of birth: Curanilahue, Chile
- Height: 1.72 m (5 ft 8 in)
- Position: Midfielder

Youth career
- 1996–1998: Huachipato

Senior career*
| Years | Team | Apps | (Gls) |
| 1999–2007 | Huachipato | 202 | (4) |
| 2008 | Santiago Morning | | |
| 2008 | Lota Schwager | | (1) |
| 2009 | Lota Schwager | 32 | (3) |
| 2010 | PSM Makassar | 16 | (0) |
| 2010–2011 | Gresik United | | (10) |
| 2011–2012 | PSMS Medan | 15 | (4) |
| 2012 | Persib Bandung | | |

Managerial career
- Huachipato (youth)
- * Club domestic league appearances and goals

Luis Alejandro Peña Sanhueza (born 30 June 1979) is a Chilean former professional footballer who played as a midfielder.

== Career ==
Peña joined Huachipato youth ranks at the age of sixteen and made his professional debut in a match against Palestino at the age of nineteen thanks to the coach Andrija Perčić.

After a brief stint with Santiago Morning in 2008, he joined Lota Schwager in the same year.

In 2010, he moved to Indonesia thanks to a Chilean colleague and joined PSM Makassar. After six months with the club, he switched to Gresik United, where he scored ten goals and became the historical goalscorer for the club at that time. He also played for PSMS Medan and Persib Bandung.

== Post-retirement ==
Peña has served as coach in the Huachipato youth ranks.
