= Fahrizal Dillah =

Indonesian professional footballer

Personal information
- Full name: Fahrizal Dillah
- Date of birth: 14 April 1990 (age 36)
- Place of birth: Sigli, Indonesia
- Height: 1.80 m (5 ft 11 in)
- Position: Striker

Team information
- Current team: PSAB Aceh Besar
- Number: 27

Youth career
- 2006–2007: Persiraja Banda Aceh

Senior career*
Years	Team	Apps	(Gls)
2008–2009	PSSB Bireuen	10	(0)
2009–2013	Persiraja Banda Aceh	40	(20)
2014	Semen Padang	7	(0)
2015	Persegres Gresik United	2	(0)
2016–2019	Persiraja Banda Aceh	41	(22)
2022	Persiraja Banda Aceh	5	(0)
2025–	PSAB Aceh Besar	1	(0)
- * Club domestic league appearances and goals as of 1 October 2022

Fahrizal Dillah (born 14 April 1990) is an Indonesian professional footballer who plays as a striker for Liga 4 club PSAB Aceh Besar.

== Club career ==
=== Persiraja Banda Aceh ===
He is a product of Persiraja Banda Aceh youth academy. He was then promoted to senior team and played for Persiraja in 2011-12 Indonesian Premier League and 2013 Indonesian Premier League, which were the highest tier Indonesian league at that time. In total, he scored 6 goals.

=== Semen Padang ===
He signed for Semen Padang in 2013 to play in Indonesia Super League. He played in 7 league games and 2 cups game without scoring any goal.

=== Persegres Gresik United ===
In 2014, he played for Persegres Gresik United, and played in 2 league games and 2 cup games, but did not score any goal.

=== Persiraja Banda Aceh ===
He rejoined his youth club Persiraja Banda Aceh in 2016, and became Persiraja's top goalscorer in 2016 ISC B with 11 goals.
