= 2023–24 Liga 3 East Java =

2023–24 Liga 3 Kapal Api PSSI East Java

Tournament details
- Country: Indonesia
- Dates: 5 December 2023 – 6 February 2024
- Teams: 53

Final positions
- Champions: Persibo Bojonegoro (1st title)
- Runners-up: Persedikab Kediri
- Third place: Persekabpas Pasuruan
- Fourth place: NZR Sumbersari
- Qualified for: National phase

Tournament statistics
- Matches played: 230
- Goals scored: 722 (3.14 per match)
- All statistics correct as of 6 February 2024.

The 2023–24 Liga 3 East Java (also known as 2023–24 Liga 3 Kapal Api PSSI East Java for sponsorship reason) is the eighth season of Liga 3 East Java as a qualifying round for the national phase of the 2023–24 Liga 3.

NZR Sumbersari are the defending champions after winning it in the 2021 season.

== Teams ==
A total of 53 teams are competing in this season.

Regencies	Clubs
Bangkalan	Perseba
Banyuwangi	Persewangi
Banyuwangi	Banyuwangi Putra
Blitar	PSBI
Bojonegoro	Bojonegoro
Bojonegoro	Persibo
Bondowoso	Persebo 1964
Bondowoso	Persebo Muda
Jember	Persid
Kediri	Persedikab
Kediri	Triple'S
Lumajang	PSIL
Madiun	Persekama
Magetan	Persemag
Malang	Persekam
Malang	Singhasari
Mojokerto	AC Majapahit
Mojokerto	PS Mojokerto Putra

Regencies	Clubs
Nganjuk	Persenga
Ngawi	Persinga
Pacitan	Perspa
Pamekasan	Simo Putra
Pamekasan	Persepam
Pasuruan	Persekabpas
Pasuruan	Assyabaab Bangil
Ponorogo	Persepon
Probolinggo	Persipro 54
Sampang	Persesa
Sumenep	Perssu Madura City
Trenggalek	Persiga
Tuban	Persatu
Tulungagung	Akademi Arema Ngunut
Tulungagung	Naga Emas Asri
Tulungagung	Perseta 1970
Tulungagung	Perseta

Cities	Clubs
Batu	Persikoba
Blitar	PSBK
Kediri	Inter Pemuda Kediri
Madiun	Madiun Putra
Madiun	PSM
Malang	Arema Indonesia
Malang	Malang United
Malang	NZR Sumbersari
Malang	Persema
Pasuruan	Pasuruan United
Pasuruan	Persekap
Pasuruan	PSPK
Surabaya	Arek Suroboyo
Surabaya	Bajul Ijo
Surabaya	Mitra Bola Utama
Surabaya	Mitra Surabaya
Surabaya	Kresna Unesa
Surabaya	Surabaya Muda
Surabaya	Suryanaga Connection

Note

1. WD: As of 6 December 2023, Asprov PSSI East Java announced the withdrawal of Arek Suroboyo from their participation in this season's competition.

== First round ==
=== Group A ===
All matches will be held at Diponegoro Stadium, Banyuwangi Regency.

Pos	Team	Pld	W	D	L	GF	GA	GD	Pts	Qualification
1	Banyuwangi Putra (H)	6	6	0	0	22	4	+18	18	Advance to the Second Round
2	Suryanaga Connection	6	4	0	2	15	8	+7	12	Advance to the Second Round
3	Persekap	6	1	0	5	6	17	−11	3 (Note: Tied on head-to-head points, head-to-head goal difference, and head-to-head goal scored. Overall goal difference: Persekap −11, Malang United −14.)	
4	Malang United	6	1	0	5	5	19	−14	3	

Source: Liga 3 Jawa Timur 2023
(H) Hosts
Notes:
5 December 2023
13.00 WIB

Suryanaga Connection	2−1	Persekap
	Report

Diponegoro Stadium, Banyuwangi Regency
5 December 2023
15.15 WIB

Banyuwangi Putra	6−1	Malang United
	Report

Diponegoro Stadium, Banyuwangi Regency

7 December 2023
13.00 WIB

Persekap	2−4	Banyuwangi Putra
	Report

Diponegoro Stadium, Banyuwangi Regency
7 December 2023
15.15 WIB

Malang United	0−4	Suryanaga Connection
	Report

Diponegoro Stadium, Banyuwangi Regency

9 December 2023
13.00 WIB

Persekap	2−1	Malang United
	Report

Diponegoro Stadium, Banyuwangi Regency
9 December 2023
15.15 WIB

Banyuwangi Putra	2–0	Suryanaga Connection
	Report

Diponegoro Stadium, Banyuwangi Regency

13 December 2023
13.00 WIB

Persekap	0−4	Suryanaga Connection
	Report

Diponegoro Stadium, Banyuwangi Regency
13 December 2023
15.15 WIB

Malang United	0−2	Banyuwangi Putra
	Report

Diponegoro Stadium, Banyuwangi Regency

15 December 2023
13.00 WIB

Suryanaga Connection	4−1	Malang United
	Report

Diponegoro Stadium, Banyuwangi Regency
15 December 2023
15.15 WIB

Banyuwangi Putra	4−0	Persekap
	Report

Diponegoro Stadium, Banyuwangi Regency

17 December 2023
13.00 WIB

Malang United	2−1	Persekap
	Report

Diponegoro Stadium, Banyuwangi Regency
17 December 2023
15.15 WIB

Suryanaga Connection	1−4	Banyuwangi Putra
	Report

Diponegoro Stadium, Banyuwangi Regency

=== Group B ===
All matches will be held at Diponegoro Stadium, Banyuwangi Regency.

Pos	Team	Pld	W	D	L	GF	GA	GD	Pts	Qualification
1	Persewangi (H)	4	4	0	0	10	4	+6	12	Advance to the Second Round
2	NZR Sumbersari	4	2	0	2	11	5	+6	6	Advance to the Second Round
3	Persebo Muda	4	0	0	4	1	13	−12	0	
4	Arek Suroboyo	0	0	0	0	0	0	0	0	Withdrew (Note: As of 6 December 2023, Asprov PSSI East Java announced the withdrawal of Arek Suroboyo from their participation in this season's competition.)

Source: Liga 3 Jawa Timur 2023
(H) Hosts
8 December 2023
15.15 WIB

Persebo Muda	0−2	NZR Sumbersari
	Report

Diponegoro Stadium, Banyuwangi Regency

10 December 2023
15.15 WIB

NZR Sumbersari	3−4	Persewangi
	Report

Diponegoro Stadium, Banyuwangi Regency

11 December 2023
15.15 WIB

Persewangi	3−0	Persebo Muda
	Report

Diponegoro Stadium, Banyuwangi Regency

14 December 2023
15.15 WIB

NZR Sumbersari	6−0	Persebo Muda
	Report

Diponegoro Stadium, Banyuwangi Regency

16 December 2023
15.15 WIB

Persewangi	1−0	NZR Sumbersari
	Report

Diponegoro Stadium, Banyuwangi Regency

18 December 2023
15.15 WIB

Persebo Muda	1−2	Persewangi
	Report

Diponegoro Stadium, Banyuwangi Regency

=== Group C ===
All matches will be held at Semeru Stadium, Lumajang Regency.

Pos	Team	Pld	W	D	L	GF	GA	GD	Pts	Qualification
1	PSIL (H)	6	4	2	0	13	3	+10	14	Advance to the Second Round
2	Persekam	6	4	0	2	8	4	+4	12	Advance to the Second Round
3	Persebo 1964	6	1	3	2	5	6	−1	6	
4	Surabaya Muda	6	0	1	5	4	17	−13	1	

Source: Liga 3 Jawa Timur 2023
(H) Hosts
5 December 2023
13.00 WIB

Persekam	1−0	Persebo 1964
	Report

Semeru Stadium, Lumajang Regency
5 December 2023
15.15 WIB

PSIL	2−1	Surabaya Muda
	Report

Semeru Stadium, Lumajang Regency

7 December 2023
13.00 WIB

Persebo 1964	0−0	PSIL
	Report

Semeru Stadium, Lumajang Regency
7 December 2023
15.15 WIB

Surabaya Muda	0−2	Persekam
	Report

Semeru Stadium, Lumajang Regency

9 December 2023
13.00 WIB

Persebo 1964	2−0	Surabaya Muda
	Report

Semeru Stadium, Lumajang Regency
9 December 2023
15.15 WIB

PSIL	2−0	Persekam
	Report

Semeru Stadium, Lumajang Regency

13 December 2023
13.00 WIB

Persebo 1964	0−2	Persekam
	Report

Semeru Stadium, Lumajang Regency
13 December 2023
15.15 WIB

Surabaya Muda	1−6	PSIL
	Report

Semeru Stadium, Lumajang Regency

15 December 2023
13.00 WIB

Persekam	3−0	Surabaya Muda
	Report

Semeru Stadium, Lumajang Regency
15 December 2023
15.15 WIB

PSIL	1−1	Persebo 1964
	Report

Semeru Stadium, Lumajang Regency

17 December 2023
13.00 WIB

Surabaya Muda	2−2	Persebo 1964
	Report

Semeru Stadium, Lumajang Regency
17 December 2023
15.15 WIB

Persekam	0−2	PSIL
	Report

Semeru Stadium, Lumajang Regency

=== Group D ===
All matches will be held at Menak Sopal Stadium, Trenggalek Regency.

Pos	Team	Pld	W	D	L	GF	GA	GD	Pts	Qualification
1	Persiga (H)	4	4	0	0	22	3	+19	12	Advance to the Second Round
2	Persekama	4	1	1	2	8	17	−9	4	Advance to the Second Round
3	Naga Emas Asri	4	0	1	3	4	14	−10	1	

Source: Liga 3 Jawa Timur 2023
(H) Hosts
5 December 2023
15.15 WIB

Persekama	2−5	Persiga
	Report

Menak Sopal Stadium, Trenggalek Regency

7 December 2023
15.15 WIB

Naga Emas Asri	3−4	Persekama
	Report

Menak Sopal Stadium, Trenggalek Regency

9 December 2023
15.15 WIB

Persiga	5−0	Naga Emas Asri
	Report

Menak Sopal Stadium, Trenggalek Regency

13 December 2023
15.15 WIB

Persiga	8−1	Persekama
	Report

Menak Sopal Stadium, Trenggalek Regency

15 December 2023
15.15 WIB

Persekama	1−1	Naga Emas Asri
	Report

Menak Sopal Stadium, Trenggalek Regency

17 December 2023
15.15 WIB

Naga Emas Asri	0−4	Persiga
	Report

Menak Sopal Stadium, Trenggalek Regency

=== Group E ===
All matches will be held at Gajah Mada Stadium, Mojokerto Regency

Pos	Team	Pld	W	D	L	GF	GA	GD	Pts	Qualification
1	PS Mojokerto Putra (H)	6	4	1	1	9	3	+6	13	Advance to the Second Round
2	Assyabaab Bangil	6	3	1	2	8	6	+2	10	Advance to the Second Round
3	Simo Putra	6	1	2	3	4	10	−6	5 (Note: Head-to-head points: Simo Putra 4, Persenga 1.)	
4	Persenga	6	1	2	3	2	4	−2	5	

Source: Liga 3 Jawa Timur 2023
(H) Hosts
Notes:
5 December 2023
13.00 WIB

Assyabaab Bangil	5−1	Simo Putra
	Report

Gajah Mada Stadium, Mojokerto Regency
5 December 2023
15.15 WIB

PS Mojokerto Putra	1−0	Persenga
	Report

Gajah Mada Stadium, Mojokerto Regency

7 December 2023
13.00 WIB

Simo Putra	1−3	PS Mojokerto Putra
	Report

Gajah Mada Stadium, Mojokerto Regency
7 December 2023
15.15 WIB

Persenga	0−1	Assyabaab Bangil
	Report

Gajah Mada Stadium, Mojokerto Regency

9 December 2023
13.00 WIB

Simo Putra	1−1	Persenga
	Report

Gajah Mada Stadium, Mojokerto Regency
9 December 2023
15.15 WIB

PS Mojokerto Putra	2−1	Assyabaab Bangil
	Report

Gajah Mada Stadium, Mojokerto Regency

13 December 2023
13.00 WIB

Simo Putra	0−1	Assyabaab Bangil
	Report

Gajah Mada Stadium, Mojokerto Regency
13 December 2023
15.15 WIB

Persenga	1−0	PS Mojokerto Putra
	Report

Gajah Mada Stadium, Mojokerto Regency

15 December 2023
13.00 WIB

Assyabaab Bangil	0−0	Persenga
	Report

Gajah Mada Stadium, Mojokerto Regency
15 December 2023
15.15 WIB

PS Mojokerto Putra	0−0	Simo Putra
	Report

Gajah Mada Stadium, Mojokerto Regency

17 December 2023
13.00 WIB

Persenga	0−1	Simo Putra
	Report

Gajah Mada Stadium, Mojokerto Regency
17 December 2023
15.15 WIB

Assyabaab Bangil	0−3	PS Mojokerto Putra
	Report

Gajah Mada Stadium, Mojokerto Regency

=== Group F ===
All matches will be held at Bayuangga Stadium, Probolinggo Regency.

Pos	Team	Pld	W	D	L	GF	GA	GD	Pts	Qualification
1	Persipro 54 (H)	6	6	0	0	28	1	+27	18	Advance to the Second Round
2	Mitra Bola Utama	6	4	0	2	16	8	+8	12	Advance to the Second Round
3	Singhasari	6	0	2	4	1	15	−14	2 (Note: Tied on head-to-head points, head-to-head goal difference and head-to-head goal scored. Overall goal difference: Singhasari −14, Bajul Ijo −21.)	
4	Bajul Ijo	6	0	2	4	3	24	−21	2	

Source: Liga 3 Jawa Timur 2023
(H) Hosts
Notes:
5 December 2023
13.00 WIB

Mitra Bola Utama	5−1	Bajul Ijo
	Report

Bayuangga Stadium, Probolinggo Regency
5 December 2023
15.15 WIB

Persipro 54	4−0	Singhasari
	Report

Bayuangga Stadium, Probolinggo Regency

7 December 2023
13.00 WIB

Bajul Ijo	1−7	Persipro 54
	Report

Bayuangga Stadium, Probolinggo Regency
7 December 2023
15.15 WIB

Singhasari	0−2	Mitra Bola Utama
	Report

Bayuangga Stadium, Probolinggo Regency

9 December 2023
13.00 WIB

Bajul Ijo	1−1	Singhasari
	Report

Bayuangga Stadium, Probolinggo Regency
9 December 2023
15.15 WIB

Persipro 54	3−0	Mitra Bola Utama
	Report

Bayuangga Stadium, Probolinggo Regency

13 December 2023
13.00 WIB

Bajul Ijo	0−5	Mitra Bola Utama
	Report

Bayuangga Stadium, Probolinggo Regency
13 December 2023
15.15 WIB

Singhasari	0−4	Persipro 54
	Report

Bayuangga Stadium, Probolinggo Regency

15 December 2023
13.00 WIB

Mitra Bola Utama	4−0	Singhasari
	Report

Bayuangga Stadium, Probolinggo Regency
15 December 2023
15.15 WIB

Persipro 54	6−0	Bajul Ijo
	Report

Bayuangga Stadium, Probolinggo Regency

17 December 2023
13.00 WIB

Singhasari	0−0	Bajul Ijo
	Report

Bayuangga Stadium, Probolinggo Regency
17 December 2023
15.15 WIB

Mitra Bola Utama	0−4	Persipro 54
	Report

Bayuangga Stadium, Probolinggo Regency

=== Group G ===
All matches will be held at R. Soedarsono Stadium, Pasuruan Regency

Pos	Team	Pld	W	D	L	GF	GA	GD	Pts	Qualification
1	Persekabpas (H)	4	3	1	0	16	5	+11	10	Advance to the Second Round
2	Mitra Surabaya	4	2	1	1	8	8	0	7	Advance to the Second Round
3	PSPK	4	0	0	4	5	16	−11	0	

Source: Liga 3 Jawa Timur 2023
(H) Hosts
5 December 2023
15.15 WIB

Mitra Surabaya	0−4	Persekabpas
	Report

R. Soedarsono Stadium, Pasuruan Regency

7 December 2023
15.15 WIB

PSPK	2−3	Mitra Surabaya
	Report

R. Soedarsono Stadium, Pasuruan Regency

9 December 2023
15.15 WIB

Persekabpas	6–0	PSPK
	Report

R. Soedarsono Stadium, Pasuruan Regency

13 December 2023
15.15 WIB

Persekabpas	2−2	Mitra Surabaya
	Report

R. Soedarsono Stadium, Pasuruan Regency

15 December 2023
15.15 WIB

Mitra Surabaya	3−0	PSPK
	Report

R. Soedarsono Stadium, Pasuruan Regency

17 December 2023
15.15 WIB

PSPK	3−4	Persekabpas
	Report

R. Soedarsono Stadium, Pasuruan Regency

=== Group H ===
All matches will be held at Jember Sport Garden Stadium, Jember Regency.

Pos	Team	Pld	W	D	L	GF	GA	GD	Pts	Qualification
1	Persid (H)	6	6	0	0	12	2	+10	18	Advance to the Second Round
2	Pasuruan United	6	3	1	2	7	5	+2	10	Advance to the Second Round
3	Kresna Unesa	6	2	1	3	6	7	−1	7	
4	Persema	6	0	0	6	2	13	−11	0	

Source: Liga 3 Jawa Timur 2023
(H) Hosts
5 December 2023
13.00 WIB

Kresna Unesa	0−2	Pasuruan United
	Report

Jember Sport Garden Stadium, Jember Regency
5 December 2023
15.15 WIB

Persid	3−0	Persema
	Report

Jember Sport Garden Stadium, Jember Regency

7 December 2023
13.00 WIB

Pasuruan United	0−1	Persid
	Report

Jember Sport Garden Stadium, Jember Regency
7 December 2023
15.15 WIB

Persema	0−1	Kresna Unesa
	Report

Jember Sport Garden Stadium, Jember Regency

9 December 2023
13.00 WIB

Pasuruan United	2−1	Persema
	Report

Jember Sport Garden Stadium, Jember Regency
9 December 2023
15.15 WIB

Persid	2–1	Kresna Unesa
	Report

Jember Sport Garden Stadium, Jember Regency

13 December 2023
13.00 WIB

Pasuruan United	1–1	Kresna Unesa
	Report

Jember Sport Garden Stadium, Jember Regency
13 December 2023
15.15 WIB

Persema	0−3	Persid
	Report

Jember Sport Garden Stadium, Jember Regency

15 December 2023
13.00 WIB

Kresna Unesa	3−1	Persema
	Report

Jember Sport Garden Stadium, Jember Regency
15 December 2023
15.15 WIB

Persid	2−1	Pasuruan United
	Report

Jember Sport Garden Stadium, Jember Regency

17 December 2023
13.00 WIB

Persema	0−1	Pasuruan United
	Report

Jember Sport Garden Stadium, Jember Regency
17 December 2023
15.15 WIB

Kresna Unesa	0−1	Persid
	Report

Jember Sport Garden Stadium, Jember Regency

=== Group I ===
All matches will be held at Gelora Penataran Stadium, Blitar Regency.

Pos	Team	Pld	W	D	L	GF	GA	GD	Pts	Qualification
1	Triple'S	6	3	2	1	9	4	+5	11 (Note: Tied on head-do-head points. Head-to-head goal difference: Triple'S +1, PSBI 0, Persikoba −1.)	Advance to the Second Round
2	PSBI (H)	6	3	2	1	10	5	+5	11	Advance to the Second Round
3	Persikoba	6	3	2	1	9	4	+5	11	
4	Perseta (Note: Perseta was deducted three points by the disciplinary committee of Asprov PSSI East Java for including an unauthorised player in the starting XI in the match against Persikoba on 8 December 2023.)	6	0	0	6	1	16	−15	−3	

Source: Liga 3 Jawa Timur 2023
(H) Hosts
Notes:
6 December 2023
13.00 WIB

Persikoba	0−2	Triple'S
	Report

Gelora Penataran Stadium, Blitar Regency
6 December 2023
15.15 WIB

PSBI	1–0	Perseta
	Report

Gelora Penataran Stadium, Blitar Regency

8 December 2023
13.00 WIB

Triple'S	2–2	PSBI
	Report

Gelora Penataran Stadium, Blitar Regency
8 December 2023
15.15 WIB

Perseta	0−3	Persikoba
	Report

Gelora Penataran Stadium, Blitar Regency

This match initially ended with the score Perseta 3−1 Persikoba. However, the disciplinary committee of Asprov PSSI East Java as of 9 December 2023 stated that the score was changed to Perseta 0−3 Persikoba, after Perseta was indicated to have violated league regulations.

10 December 2023
13.00 WIB

Triple'S	1–0	Perseta
	Report

Gelora Penataran Stadium, Blitar Regency
10 December 2023
15.15 WIB

PSBI	1–1	Persikoba
	Report

Gelora Penataran Stadium, Blitar Regency

13 December 2023
13.00 WIB

Triple'S	1−1	Persikoba
	Report

Gelora Penataran Stadium, Blitar Regency
13 December 2023
15.15 WIB

Perseta	1−5	PSBI
	Report

Gelora Penataran Stadium, Blitar Regency

15 December 2023
13.00 WIB

Persikoba	3−0	Perseta
	Report

Gelora Penataran Stadium, Blitar Regency
15 December 2023
15.15 WIB

PSBI	1−0	Triple'S
	Report

Gelora Penataran Stadium, Blitar Regency

17 December 2023
13.00 WIB

Perseta	0−3	Triple'S
	Report

Gelora Penataran Stadium, Blitar Regency
17 December 2023
15.15 WIB

Persikoba	1−0	PSBI
	Report

Gelora Penataran Stadium, Blitar Regency

=== Group J ===
All matches will be held at Wilis Stadium, Madiun City.

Pos	Team	Pld	W	D	L	GF	GA	GD	Pts	Qualification
1	PSM Madiun (H)	6	6	0	0	16	6	+10	18	Advance to the Second Round
2	Perseta 1970	6	3	1	2	9	8	+1	10	Advance to the Second Round
3	Persinga	6	1	1	4	6	9	−3	4	
4	Arema Indonesia	6	0	2	4	1	9	−8	2	

Source: Liga 3 Jawa Timur 2023
(H) Hosts
5 December 2023
13.00 WIB

Persinga	2−3	Perseta 1970
	Report

Wilis Stadium, Madiun City
5 December 2023
15.15 WIB

PSM Madiun	2−1	Arema Indonesia
	Report

Wilis Stadium, Madiun City

7 December 2023
13.00 WIB

Perseta 1970	2−3	PSM Madiun
	Report

Wilis Stadium, Madiun City
7 December 2023
15.15 WIB

Arema Indonesia	0−0	Persinga
	Report

Wilis Stadium, Madiun City

9 December 2023
13.00 WIB

Perseta 1970	3−0	Arema Indonesia
	Report

Wilis Stadium, Madiun City
9 December 2023
15.15 WIB

PSM Madiun	2−1	Persinga
	Report

Wilis Stadium, Madiun City

13 December 2023
13.00 WIB

Perseta 1970	1−0	Persinga
	Report

Wilis Stadium, Madiun City
13 December 2023
15.15 WIB

Arema Indonesia	0−3	PSM Madiun
	Report

Wilis Stadium, Madiun City

15 December 2023
13.00 WIB

Persinga	1−0	Arema Indonesia
	Report

Wilis Stadium, Madiun City
15 December 2023
15.15 WIB

PSM Madiun	3−0	Perseta 1970
	Report

Wilis Stadium, Madiun City

17 December 2023
13.00 WIB

Arema Indonesia	0−0	Perseta 1970
	Report

Wilis Stadium, Madiun City
17 December 2023
15.15 WIB

Persinga	2−3	PSM Madiun
	Report

Wilis Stadium, Madiun City

=== Group K ===
All matches will be held at Yosonegoro Stadium, Magetan Regency.

Pos	Team	Pld	W	D	L	GF	GA	GD	Pts	Qualification
1	Persemag (H)	6	4	2	0	11	2	+9	14	Advance to the Second Round
2	Perspa	6	2	2	2	5	6	−1	8 (Note: Head-to-head points: Perspa 4, Persepon 1.)	Advance to the Second Round
3	Persepon	6	2	2	2	6	3	+3	8	
4	Bojonegoro	6	0	2	4	2	13	−11	2	

Source: Liga 3 Jawa Timur 2023
(H) Hosts
Notes:
5 December 2023
13.00 WIB

Bojonegoro	0−0	Perspa
	Report

Yosonegoro Stadium, Magetan Regency
5 December 2023
15.15 WIB

Persemag	0−0	Persepon
	Report

Yosonegoro Stadium, Magetan Regency

7 December 2023
13.00 WIB

Perspa	0−1	Persemag
	Report

Yosonegoro Stadium, Magetan Regency
7 December 2023
15.15 WIB

Persepon	3−0	Bojonegoro
	Report

Yosonegoro Stadium, Magetan Regency

9 December 2023
13.00 WIB

Perspa	1−0	Persepon
	Report

Yosonegoro Stadium, Magetan Regency
9 December 2023
15.15 WIB

Persemag	1−1	Bojonegoro
	Report

Yosonegoro Stadium, Magetan Regency

13 December 2023
13.00 WIB

Perspa	3−0	Bojonegoro
	Report

Yosonegoro Stadium, Magetan Regency
13 December 2023
15.15 WIB

Persepon	0−1	Persemag
	Report

Yosonegoro Stadium, Magetan Regency

15 December 2023
13.00 WIB

Bojonegoro	0−2	Persepon
	Report

Yosonegoro Stadium, Magetan Regency
15 December 2023
15.15 WIB

Persemag	4−0	Perspa
	Report

Yosonegoro Stadium, Magetan Regency

17 December 2023
13.00 WIB

Persepon	1−1	Perspa
	Report

Yosonegoro Stadium, Magetan Regency
17 December 2023
15.15 WIB

Bojonegoro	1−4	Persemag
	Report

Yosonegoro Stadium, Magetan Regency

=== Group L ===
All matches will be held at Canda Bhirawa Stadium, Kediri Regency.

Pos	Team	Pld	W	D	L	GF	GA	GD	Pts	Qualification
1	Persedikab (H)	6	6	0	0	32	0	+32	18	Advance to the Second Round
2	AC Majapahit	6	4	0	2	15	5	+10	12	Advance to the Second Round
3	Akademi Arema Ngunut	6	1	1	4	2	19	−17	4	
4	PSBK	6	0	1	5	3	28	−25	1	

Source: Liga 3 Jawa Timur 2023
(H) Hosts
5 December 2023
13.00 WIB

PSBK	0−1	Akademi Arema Ngunut
	Report

Canda Bhirawa Stadium, Kediri Regency
5 December 2023
15.15 WIB

Persedikab	1−0	AC Majapahit
	Report

Canda Bhirawa Stadium, Kediri Regency

7 December 2023
13.00 WIB

Akademi Arema Ngunut	0−6	Persedikab
	Report

Canda Bhirawa Stadium, Kediri Regency
7 December 2023
15.15 WIB

AC Majapahit	4−1	PSBK
	Report

Canda Bhirawa Stadium, Kediri Regency

9 December 2023
13.00 WIB

Akademi Arema Ngunut	0−2	AC Majapahit
	Report

Canda Bhirawa Stadium, Kediri Regency
9 December 2023
15.15 WIB

Persedikab	4−0	PSBK
	Report

Canda Bhirawa Stadium, Kediri Regency

13 December 2023
13.00 WIB

Akademi Arema Ngunut	1−1	PSBK
	Report

Canda Bhirawa Stadium, Kediri Regency
13 December 2023
15.15 WIB

AC Majapahit	0−2	Persedikab
	Report

Canda Bhirawa Stadium, Kediri Regency

15 December 2023
13.00 WIB

PSBK	1−7	AC Majapahit
	Report

Canda Bhirawa Stadium, Kediri Regency
15 December 2023
15.15 WIB

Persedikab	8−0	Akademi Arema Ngunut
	Report

Canda Bhirawa Stadium, Kediri Regency

17 December 2023
13.00 WIB

AC Majapahit	2−0	Akademi Arema Ngunut
	Report

Canda Bhirawa Stadium, Kediri Regency
17 December 2023
15.15 WIB

PSBK	0−11	Persedikab
	Report

Canda Bhirawa Stadium, Kediri Regency

=== Group M ===
All matches will be held at Ahmad Yani Stadium, Sumenep Regency.

Pos	Team	Pld	W	D	L	GF	GA	GD	Pts	Qualification
1	Perssu Madura City (H)	6	6	0	0	13	3	+10	18	Advance to the Second Round
2	Persepam	6	3	1	2	6	4	+2	10	Advance to the Second Round
3	Perseba	6	1	1	4	6	9	−3	4	
4	Persesa	6	1	0	5	5	14	−9	3	

Source: Liga 3 Jawa Timur 2023
(H) Hosts
5 December 2023
13.00 WIB

Persepam	2−0	Persesa
	Report

Ahmad Yani Stadium, Sumenep Regency.
5 December 2023
15.15 WIB

Perssu Madura City	1−0	Perseba
	Report

Ahmad Yani Stadium, Sumenep Regency.

7 December 2023
13.00 WIB

Persesa	1−6	Perssu Madura City
	Report

Ahmad Yani Stadium, Sumenep Regency.
7 December 2023
15.15 WIB

Perseba	1−2	Persepam
	Report

Ahmad Yani Stadium, Sumenep Regency.

9 December 2023
13.00 WIB

Persesa	1−0	Perseba
	Report

Ahmad Yani Stadium, Sumenep Regency.
9 December 2023
15.15 WIB

Perssu Madura City	1−0	Persepam
	Report

Ahmad Yani Stadium, Sumenep Regency.

13 December 2023
13.00 WIB

Persesa	0−1	Persepam
	Report

Ahmad Yani Stadium, Sumenep Regency.
13 December 2023
15.15 WIB

Perseba	1−2	Perssu Madura City
	Report

Ahmad Yani Stadium, Sumenep Regency.

15 December 2023
13.00 WIB

Persepam	1−1	Perseba
	Report

Ahmad Yani Stadium, Sumenep Regency.
15 December 2023
15.15 WIB

Perssu Madura City	2−1	Persesa
	Report

Ahmad Yani Stadium, Sumenep Regency.

17 December 2023
13.00 WIB

Perseba	3−2	Persesa
	Report

Ahmad Yani Stadium, Sumenep Regency.
17 December 2023
15.15 WIB

Persepam	0−1	Perssu Madura City
	Report

Ahmad Yani Stadium, Sumenep Regency.

=== Group N ===
All matches will be held at Letjen H. Soedirman Stadium, Bojonegoro Regency.

Pos	Team	Pld	W	D	L	GF	GA	GD	Pts	Qualification
1	Persibo (H)	6	4	2	0	14	3	+11	14	Advance to the Second Round
2	Madiun Putra	6	3	1	2	10	13	−3	10	Advance to the Second Round
3	Persatu	6	1	2	3	5	7	−2	5	
4	Inter Pemuda Kediri	6	0	3	3	7	13	−6	3	

Source: Liga 3 Jawa Timur 2023
(H) Hosts
5 December 2023
13.00 WIB

Persatu	0−1	Madiun Putra
	Report

Letjen H. Soedirman Stadium, Bojonegoro Regency
5 December 2023
15.15 WIB

Persibo	2−0	Inter Pemuda Kediri
	Report

Letjen H. Soedirman Stadium, Bojonegoro Regency

7 December 2023
13.00 WIB

Madiun Putra	0−2	Persibo
	Report

Letjen H. Soedirman Stadium, Bojonegoro Regency
7 December 2023
15.15 WIB

Inter Pemuda Kediri	0−3	Persatu
	Report

Letjen H. Soedirman Stadium, Bojonegoro Regency

9 December 2023
13.00 WIB

Madiun Putra	2−1	Inter Pemuda Kediri
	Report

Letjen H. Soedirman Stadium, Bojonegoro Regency
9 December 2023
15.15 WIB

Persibo	3–1	Persatu
	Report

Letjen H. Soedirman Stadium, Bojonegoro Regency

13 December 2023
13.00 WIB

Madiun Putra	2−0	Persatu
	Report

Letjen H. Soedirman Stadium, Bojonegoro Regency
13 December 2023
15.15 WIB

Inter Pemuda Kediri	1−1	Persibo
	Report

Letjen H. Soedirman Stadium, Bojonegoro Regency

15 December 2023
13.00 WIB

Persatu	1−1	Inter Pemuda Kediri
	Report

Letjen H. Soedirman Stadium, Bojonegoro Regency
15 December 2023
15.15 WIB

Persibo	6−1	Madiun Putra
	Report

Letjen H. Soedirman Stadium, Bojonegoro Regency

17 December 2023
13.00 WIB

Inter Pemuda Kediri	4−4	Madiun Putra
	Report

Letjen H. Soedirman Stadium, Bojonegoro Regency
17 December 2023
15.15 WIB

Persatu	0−0	Persibo
	Report

Letjen H. Soedirman Stadium, Bojonegoro Regency

== Second round ==
=== Group AA ===
All matches will be held at Diponegoro Stadium, Banyuwangi Regency.

Pos	Team	Pld	W	D	L	GF	GA	GD	Pts	Qualification
1	Persid	3	2	1	0	6	1	+5	7	Advance to the Third Round
2	Banyuwangi Putra (H)	3	2	1	0	6	1	+5	7	Advance to the Third Round
3	Madiun Putra	3	1	0	2	8	8	0	3	
4	Mitra Surabaya	3	0	0	3	3	13	−10	0	

Source: Asprov PSSI Jawa Timur
(H) Hosts
8 January 2024
13.00 WIB

Banyuwangi Putra	2−1	Madiun Putra
	Report

Diponegoro Stadium, Banyuwangi Regency
8 January 2024
15.15 WIB

Persid	3–0	Mitra Surabaya
	Report

Diponegoro Stadium, Banyuwangi Regency

10 January 2024
13.00 WIB

Mitra Surabaya	0–4	Banyuwangi Putra
	Report

Diponegoro Stadium, Banyuwangi Regency
10 January 2024
15.15 WIB

Madiun Putra	1–3	Persid
	Report

Diponegoro Stadium, Banyuwangi Regency

12 January 2024
13.00 WIB

Mitra Surabaya	3−6	Madiun Putra
	Report

Diponegoro Stadium, Banyuwangi Regency
12 January 2024
15.15 WIB

Persid	0−0	Banyuwangi Putra
	Report

Diponegoro Stadium, Banyuwangi Regency

=== Group BB ===
All matches will be held at Diponegoro Stadium, Banyuwangi Regency.

Pos	Team	Pld	W	D	L	GF	GA	GD	Pts	Qualification
1	Mitra Bola Utama	3	2	1	0	5	2	+3	7	Advance to the Third Round
2	Persewangi (H)	3	1	1	1	5	4	+1	4	Advance to the Third Round
3	Persepam	3	1	0	2	3	5	−2	3	
4	Triple'S	3	0	2	1	4	6	−2	2	

Source: Asprov PSSI Jawa Timur
(H) Hosts
7 January 2024
13.00 WIB

Mitra Bola Utama	1−1	Triple'S
	Report

Diponegoro Stadium, Banyuwangi Regency
7 January 2024
15.15 WIB

Persepam	0−2	Persewangi
	Report

Diponegoro Stadium, Banyuwangi Regency

9 January 2024
13.00 WIB

Persepam	3−1	Triple'S
	Report

Diponegoro Stadium, Banyuwangi Regency
9 January 2024
15.15 WIB

Mitra Bola Utama	2−1	Persewangi
	Report

Diponegoro Stadium, Banyuwangi Regency

11 January 2024
13.00 WIB

Mitra Bola Utama	2–0	Persepam
	Report

Diponegoro Stadium, Banyuwangi Regency
11 January 2024
15.15 WIB

Persewangi	2–2	Triple'S
	Report

Diponegoro Stadium, Banyuwangi Regency

=== Group CC ===
All matches will be held at Semeru Stadium, Lumajang Regency.

Pos	Team	Pld	W	D	L	GF	GA	GD	Pts	Qualification
1	PSM Madiun	3	3	0	0	11	0	+11	9	Advance to the Third Round
2	PSIL (H)	3	2	0	1	5	2	+3	6	Advance to the Third Round
3	Assyabaab Bangil	3	1	0	2	4	7	−3	3	
4	AC Majapahit	3	0	0	3	0	11	−11	0	

Source: Asprov PSSI Jawa Timur
(H) Hosts
7 January 2024
13.00 WIB

Assyabaab Bangil	0−4	PSM Madiun
	Report

Semeru Stadium, Lumajang Regency
7 January 2024
15.15 WIB

AC Majapahit	0−2	PSIL
	Report

Semeru Stadium, Lumajang Regency

9 January 2024
13.00 WIB

AC Majapahit	0−6	PSM Madiun
	Report

Semeru Stadium, Lumajang Regency
9 January 2024
15.15 WIB

Assyabaab Bangil	1−3	PSIL
	Report

Semeru Stadium, Lumajang Regency

11 January 2024
13.00 WIB

Assyabaab Bangil	3–0	AC Majapahit
	Report

Semeru Stadium, Lumajang Regency
11 January 2024
15.15 WIB

PSIL	0–1	PSM Madiun
	Report

Semeru Stadium, Lumajang Regency

=== Group DD ===
All matches will be held at Menak Sopal Stadium, Trenggalek Regency.

Pos	Team	Pld	W	D	L	GF	GA	GD	Pts	Qualification
1	Persiga (H)	3	2	1	0	7	2	+5	7	Advance to the Third Round
2	Perseta 1970	3	1	2	0	5	2	+3	5	Advance to the Third Round
3	Persemag	3	1	1	1	7	5	+2	4	
4	Persekam	3	0	0	3	2	12	−10	0	

Source: Asprov PSSI Jawa Timur
(H) Hosts
8 January 2024
08.00 WIB (Note: The Persekam vs Persemag match was originally scheduled for 7 January 2024 at 13.00 WIB, was rescheduled due to bad weather reasons to 8 January 2024 at 08.00 WIB.)

Persekam	1−4	Persemag
	Report

Menak Sopal Stadium, Trenggalek Regency
7 January 2024
15.15 WIB

Perseta 1970	0−0	Persiga
	Report

Menak Sopal Stadium, Trenggalek Regency

9 January 2024
13.00 WIB

Perseta 1970	2−2	Persemag
	Report

Menak Sopal Stadium, Trenggalek Regency
9 January 2024
15.15 WIB

Persekam	1−5	Persiga
	Report

Menak Sopal Stadium, Trenggalek Regency

11 January 2024
13.00 WIB

Persekam	0–3	Perseta 1970
	Report

Menak Sopal Stadium, Trenggalek Regency
11 January 2024
15.15 WIB

Persiga	2–1	Persemag
	Report

Menak Sopal Stadium, Trenggalek Regency

=== Group EE ===
All matches will be held at Canda Bhirawa Stadium, Kediri Regency.

Pos	Team	Pld	W	D	L	GF	GA	GD	Pts	Qualification
1	NZR Sumbersari	3	2	0	1	8	2	+6	6 (Note: Tied on head-to-head points. Head-to-head goal difference: NZR Sumbersari +1, Persedikab 0, PS Mojokerto Putra −1.)	Advance to the Third Round
2	Persedikab (H)	3	2	0	1	7	2	+5	6	Advance to the Third Round
3	PS Mojokerto Putra	3	2	0	1	5	4	+1	6	Advance to the Third Round
4	PSBI	3	0	0	3	2	14	−12	0	

Source: Asprov PSSI Jawa Timur
(H) Hosts
Notes:
7 January 2024
13.00 WIB

PS Mojokerto Putra	3−1	PSBI
	Report

Canda Bhirawa Stadium, Kediri Regency
7 January 2024
15.15 WIB

Persedikab	1−0	NZR Sumbersari
	Report

Canda Bhirawa Stadium, Kediri Regency

9 January 2024
13.00 WIB

NZR Sumbersari	3−1	PS Mojokerto Putra
	Report

Canda Bhirawa Stadium, Kediri Regency
9 January 2024
15.15 WIB

PSBI	1−6	Persedikab
	Report

Canda Bhirawa Stadium, Kediri Regency

11 January 2024
13.00 WIB

NZR Sumbersari	5–0	PSBI
	Report

Canda Bhirawa Stadium, Kediri Regency
11 January 2024
15.15 WIB

Persedikab	0–1	PS Mojokerto Putra
	Report

Canda Bhirawa Stadium, Kediri Regency

=== Group FF ===
All matches will be held at Ahmad Yani Stadium, Sumenep Regency.

Pos	Team	Pld	W	D	L	GF	GA	GD	Pts	Qualification
1	Persipro 54	3	2	1	0	9	3	+6	7	Advance to the Third Round
2	Perssu Madura City (H)	3	1	2	0	6	4	+2	5	Advance to the Third Round
3	Pasuruan United	3	1	1	1	8	5	+3	4	Advance to the Third Round
4	Suryanaga Connection	3	0	0	3	1	12	−11	0	

Source: Asprov PSSI Jawa Timur
(H) Hosts
7 January 2024
13.00 WIB

Persipro 54	3−0	Pasuruan United
	Report

Ahmad Yani Stadium, Sumenep Regency
7 January 2024
15.15 WIB

Perssu Madura City	2−0	Suryanaga Connection
	Report

Ahmad Yani Stadium, Sumenep Regency

9 January 2024
13.00 WIB

Suryanaga Connection	1−4	Persipro 54
	Report

Ahmad Yani Stadium, Sumenep Regency
9 January 2024
15.15 WIB

Pasuruan United	2−2	Perssu Madura City
	Report

Ahmad Yani Stadium, Sumenep Regency

11 January 2024
13.00 WIB

Suryanaga Connection	0–6	Pasuruan United
	Report

Ahmad Yani Stadium, Sumenep Regency
11 January 2024
15.15 WIB

Perssu Madura City	2–2	Persipro 54
	Report

Ahmad Yani Stadium, Sumenep Regency

=== Group GG ===
All matches will be held at Letjen H. Soedirman Stadium, Bojonegoro Regency.

Pos	Team	Pld	W	D	L	GF	GA	GD	Pts	Qualification
1	Persibo (H)	3	3	0	0	5	0	+5	9	Advance to the Third Round
2	Persekabpas	3	2	0	1	11	4	+7	6	Advance to the Third Round
3	Persekama	3	1	0	2	3	9	−6	3	
4	Perspa	3	0	0	3	3	9	−6	0	

Source: Asprov PSSI Jawa Timur
(H) Hosts
7 January 2024
13.00 WIB

Persekabpas	6−2	Perspa
	Report

Letjen H. Soedirman Stadium, Bojonegoro Regency
7 January 2024
15.15 WIB

Persibo	3−0	Persekama
	Report

Letjen H. Soedirman Stadium, Bojonegoro Regency

9 January 2024
13.00 WIB

Persekama	1−5	Persekabpas
	Report

Letjen H. Soedirman Stadium, Bojonegoro Regency
9 January 2024
15.15 WIB

Perspa	0−1	Persibo
	Report

Letjen H. Soedirman Stadium, Bojonegoro Regency

11 January 2024
13.00 WIB

Persekama	2–1	Perspa
	Report

Letjen H. Soedirman Stadium, Bojonegoro Regency
11 January 2024
15.15 WIB

Persibo	1–0	Persekabpas
	Report

Letjen H. Soedirman Stadium, Bojonegoro Regency

=== Ranking of third-placed teams ===
Pos	Grp	Team	Pld	W	D	L	GF	GA	GD	Pts	Qualification
1	EE	PS Mojokerto Putra	3	2	0	1	5	4	+1	6	Advance to the Third Round
2	FF	Pasuruan United	3	1	1	1	8	5	+3	4	Advance to the Third Round
3	DD	Persemag	3	1	1	1	7	5	+2	4	
4	AA	Madiun Putra	3	1	0	2	8	8	0	3	
5	BB	Persepam	3	1	0	2	3	5	−2	3	
6	CC	Assyabaab Bangil	3	1	0	2	4	7	−3	3	
7	GG	Persekama	3	1	0	2	3	9	−6	3	

Source: Asprov PSSI Jawa Timur

== Third round ==
=== Group HH ===
All matches will be held at R. Soedarsono Stadium, Pasuruan.

Pos	Team	Pld	W	D	L	GF	GA	GD	Pts	Qualification
1	Persekabpas (H)	3	2	1	0	9	2	+7	7	Advance to the Fourth Round
2	PSM Madiun	3	2	0	1	8	5	+3	6	Advance to the Fourth Round
3	PS Mojokerto Putra	3	0	0	3	2	13	−11	0	
4	Persid (Note: Persid was deducted six points by the disciplinary committee of Asprov PSSI East Java.)	3	1	1	1	4	3	+1	−2	

Source: Asprov PSSI Jawa Timur
(H) Hosts
Notes:
18 January 2024
13.00 WIB

Persid	2–0	PS Mojokerto Putra
	Report

R. Soedarsono Stadium, Pasuruan Regency
18 January 2024
15.15 WIB

PSM Madiun	1–2	Persekabpas
	Report

R. Soedarsono Stadium, Pasuruan Regency

20 January 2024
13.00 WIB

PS Mojokerto Putra	2–5	PSM Madiun
	Report

R. Soedarsono Stadium, Pasuruan Regency
20 January 2024
15.15 WIB

Persekabpas	1–1	Persid
	Report

R. Soedarsono Stadium, Pasuruan Regency

22 January 2024
13.00 WIB

Persid	1–2	PSM Madiun
	Report

R. Soedarsono Stadium, Pasuruan Regency
22 January 2024
15.15 WIB

Persekabpas	6–0	PS Mojokerto Putra
	Report

R. Soedarsono Stadium, Pasuruan Regency

=== Group II ===
All matches will be held at Letjen H. Soedirman Stadium, Bojonegoro Regency.

Pos	Team	Pld	W	D	L	GF	GA	GD	Pts	Qualification
1	Persibo (H)	3	3	0	0	7	3	+4	9	Advance to the Fourth Round
2	NZR Sumbersari	3	2	0	1	7	2	+5	6	Advance to the Fourth Round
3	PSIL	3	1	0	2	3	3	0	3	
4	Banyuwangi Putra	3	0	0	3	2	11	−9	0	

Source: Asprov PSSI Jawa Timur
(H) Hosts
18 January 2024
13.00 WIB

NZR Sumbersari	5–0	Banyuwangi Putra
	Report

Letjen H. Soedirman Stadium
18 January 2024
15.15 WIB

Persibo	2–0	PSIL
	Report

Letjen H. Soedirman Stadium

20 January 2024
13.00 WIB

PSIL	0–1	NZR Sumbersari
	Report

Letjen H. Soedirman Stadium
20 January 2024
15.15 WIB

Banyuwangi Putra	2–3	Persibo
	Report

Letjen H. Soedirman Stadium

22 January 2024
13.00 WIB

Banyuwangi Putra	0–3	PSIL
	Report

Letjen H. Soedirman Stadium
22 January 2024
15.15 WIB

Persibo	2–1	NZR Sumbersari
	Report

Letjen H. Soedirman Stadium

=== Group JJ ===
All matches will be held at Untung Suropati Stadium, Pasuruan City.

Pos	Team	Pld	W	D	L	GF	GA	GD	Pts	Qualification
1	Pasuruan United (H)	3	3	0	0	6	2	+4	9	Advance to the Fourth Round
2	Perssu Madura City	3	2	0	1	5	2	+3	6	Advance to the Fourth Round
3	Persiga	3	1	0	2	6	9	−3	3	
4	Mitra Bola Utama	3	0	0	3	4	8	−4	0	

Source: Asprov PSSI Jawa Timur
(H) Hosts
18 January 2024
13.00 WIB

Persiga	1–3	Perssu Madura City
	Report

Untung Suropati Stadium, Pasuruan City
18 January 2024
15.15 WIB

Mitra Bola Utama	1–2	Pasuruan United
	Report

Untung Suropati Stadium, Pasuruan City

20 January 2024
13.00 WIB

Perssu Madura City	2–0	Mitra Bola Utama
	Report

Untung Suropati Stadium, Pasuruan City
20 January 2024
15.15 WIB

Pasuruan United	3–1	Persiga
	Report

Untung Suropati Stadium, Pasuruan City

22 January 2024
13.00 WIB

Mitra Bola Utama	3–4	Persiga
	Report

Untung Suropati Stadium, Pasuruan City
22 January 2024
15.15 WIB

Perssu Madura City	0–1	Pasuruan United
	Report

Untung Suropati Stadium, Pasuruan City

=== Group KK ===
All matches will be held at Canda Bhirawa Stadium, Kediri Regency.

Pos	Team	Pld	W	D	L	GF	GA	GD	Pts	Qualification
1	Persedikab (H)	2	1	1	0	1	0	+1	4	Advance to the Fourth Round
2	Perseta 1970	2	1	0	1	3	1	+2	3	Advance to the Fourth Round
3	Persewangi	2	0	1	1	0	3	−3	1	
4	Persipro 54 (D)	0	0	0	0	0	0	0	0	Disqualified

Source: Asprov PSSI Jawa Timur
(D) Disqualified; (H) Hosts
18 January 2024
13.00 WIB

Perseta 1970	3–0	Persewangi
	Report

Canda Bhirawa Stadium, Kediri Regency
18 January 2024
15.15 WIB

Persipro 54	~~0–1~~	Persedikab
	Report

Canda Bhirawa Stadium, Kediri Regency

20 January 2024
13.00 WIB

Persewangi	Cancelled	Persipro 54

Canda Bhirawa Stadium, Kediri Regency
20 January 2024
15.15 WIB

Persedikab	1–0	Perseta 1970
	Report

Canda Bhirawa Stadium, Kediri Regency

22 January 2024
13.00 WIB

Persipro 54	Cancelled	Perseta 1970

Canda Bhirawa Stadium, Kediri Regency
22 January 2024
15.15 WIB

Persewangi	0–0	Persedikab
	Report

Canda Bhirawa Stadium, Kediri Regency

== Fourth round ==
=== Group LL ===
All matches will be held at Untung Suropati Stadium, Pasuruan City.

Pos	Team	Pld	W	D	L	GF	GA	GD	Pts	Qualification
1	Persekabpas	3	2	1	0	6	0	+6	7	Advanced to the knockout round and National phase
2	NZR Sumbersari	3	2	1	0	3	0	+3	7	Advanced to the knockout round and National phase
3	Pasuruan United (H)	3	1	0	2	3	5	−2	3	Advanced to the National phase
4	Perseta 1970	3	0	0	3	2	9	−7	0	

Source: Asprov PSSI Jawa Timur
(H) Hosts
28 January 2024
13.00 WIB

Pasuruan United	0–1	NZR Sumbersari
	Report

Untung Suropati Stadium, Pasuruan City
28 January 2024
15.15 WIB

Persekabpas Pasuruan	4–0	Perseta 1970
	Report

Untung Suropati Stadium, Pasuruan City

30 January 2024
13.00 WIB

Perseta 1970	2–3	Pasuruan United
	Report

Untung Suropati Stadium, Pasuruan City
30 January 2024
15.15 WIB

NZR Sumbersari	0–0	Persekabpas Pasuruan
	Report

Untung Suropati Stadium, Pasuruan City

1 February 2024
13.00 WIB

NZR Sumbersari	2–0	Perseta 1970
	Report

Untung Suropati Stadium, Pasuruan City
1 February 2024
15.15 WIB

Persekabpas Pasuruan	2–0	Pasuruan United
	Report

Untung Suropati Stadium, Pasuruan City

=== Group MM ===
All matches will be held at Letjen H. Soedirman Stadium, Bojonegoro Regency.

Pos	Team	Pld	W	D	L	GF	GA	GD	Pts	Qualification
1	Persibo (H)	3	2	1	0	3	1	+2	7	Advanced to the knockout round and National phase
2	Persedikab	3	1	2	0	5	4	+1	5	Advanced to the knockout round and National phase
3	PSM Madiun	3	0	2	1	6	7	−1	2	Advanced to the National phase
4	Perssu Madura City	3	0	1	2	5	7	−2	1	

Source: Asprov PSSI Jawa Timur
(H) Hosts
28 January 2024
13.00 WIB

Persedikab Kediri	2–2	PSM Madiun
	Report

Letjen H. Soedirman Stadium, Bojonegoro Regency
28 January 2024
15.15 WIB

Persibo Bojonegoro	1–0	Perssu Madura City
	Report

Letjen H. Soedirman Stadium, Bojonegoro Regency

30 January 2024
13.00 WIB

Perssu Madura City	1–2	Persedikab Kediri
	Report

Letjen H. Soedirman Stadium, Bojonegoro Regency
30 January 2024
15.15 WIB

PSM Madiun	0–1	Persibo Bojonegoro
	Report

Letjen H. Soedirman Stadium, Bojonegoro Regency

1 February 2024
13.00 WIB

PSM Madiun	4–4	Perssu Madura City
	Report

Letjen H. Soedirman Stadium, Bojonegoro Regency
1 February 2024
15.15 WIB

Persibo Bojonegoro	1–1	Persedikab Kediri
	Report

Letjen H. Soedirman Stadium, Bojonegoro Regency

== Knockout round ==
=== Bracket ===
Semi-finals
4 February 2024 – Bojonegoro
Persekabpas Pasuruan	1 (1)
Persedikab Kediri(p)	1 (4)
4 February 2024 – Bojonegoro
Persibo Bojonegoro	0 (5)
NZR Sumbersari	0 (4)

Final
6 February 2024 – Bojonegoro
Persedikab Kediri	0
Persibo Bojonegoro	2
Third place play-off
6 February 2024 – Bojonegoro
Persekabpas Pasuruan	3
NZR Sumbersari	1

=== Semi-finals ===
4 February 2024
13.00 WIB

Persekabpas Pasuruan	1–1	Persedikab Kediri
	Report
Penalties
	1–4

Letjen H. Soedirman Stadium, Bojonegoro Regency

4 February 2024
16.00 WIB

Persibo Bojonegoro	0–0	NZR Sumbersari
	Report
Penalties
	5–4

Letjen H. Soedirman Stadium, Bojonegoro Regency

=== Third place play-off ===
6 February 2024
13.00 WIB

Persekabpas Pasuruan	3–1	NZR Sumbersari
	Report

Letjen H. Soedirman Stadium, Bojonegoro Regency

=== Final ===
6 February 2024
16.00 WIB

Persedikab Kediri	0–2	Persibo Bojonegoro
	Report

Letjen H. Soedirman Stadium, Bojonegoro Regency

== Qualification to the national phase ==
Team	Method of qualification	Date of qualification	Qualified to
Persekabpas	[[Winner of Group LL]]	30 January 2024	2023–24 Liga 3 National Phase
Persibo Bojonegoro	Winner of Group MM	30 January 2024	2023–24 Liga 3 National Phase
NZR Sumbersari	Runner-up of Group LL	30 January 2024	2023–24 Liga 3 National Phase
Persedikab Kediri	Runner-up of Group MM	30 January 2024	2023–24 Liga 3 National Phase
Pasuruan United	Third-placed team of Group LL	30 January 2024	2023–24 Liga 3 National Phase
PSM Madiun	Third-placed team of Group MM	1 February 2024	2023–24 Liga 3 National Phase

== See also ==
- 2023 Liga 3 Banten
- 2023 Liga 3 Jakarta
- 2023 Liga 3 West Java Series 1
- 2023 Liga 3 Central Java
- 2023 Liga 3 Special Region of Yogyakarta
