= 2018 Liga 3 National Zone Route =

The 2018 Liga 3 National Zone Route was played from 14 July to 20 October 2018. A total of 32 teams competed in the national zone route to decide 20 of the 32 places in the national round of the 2018 Liga 3.

== Teams ==
The following 32 teams entered the national zone route:

- 757 Kepri Jaya
- Celebest
- Lampung Sakti
- Madiun Putra
- Persatu Tuban
- Persbul Buol
- Perseka Kaimana (rename it again after last year competing with the name Perseka Manokwari)
- Persekam Metro
- Persekap Pasuruan
- Persepam Madura Utama
- Persewangi Banyuwangi
- Persiba Bantul
- Persibangga Purbalingga
- Persibas Banyumas
- Persida Sidoarjo
- Persih Masurai (formerly Persih Tembilahan)
- Persijap Jepara
- Persik Kediri
- Persikabo Bogor
- Bogor (formerly Persikad Depok)
- Persinga Ngawi
- Persip Pekalongan
- Persipon Pontianak
- Persipur Purwodadi
- Perssu Real Madura
- PS Badung
- PS West Sumbawa
- PSBI Blitar
- PSBK Blitar
- PSBL Langsa
- PSCS Cilacap
- PSGC Ciamis

There should be 40 teams relegated from 2017 Liga 2 competed in this route, but Pro Duta and Persifa Fak-fak disqualified. On 5 June 2018, PSSI disqualified PPSM Magelang and Sragen United. Also PS Bengkulu, PS Timah BaBel, and Persigubin Gunung Bintang withdrew from the competition. Later on 28 July 2018, PSSI disqualified Yahukimo because they didn't attend match coordination meeting in Gawalise Stadium.

== Format ==
In the preliminary round, 32 teams divided into eight groups. Each group was played on a home-and-away round-robin basis, except for group 7 and 8 that is played on a home tournament. The winners and runner-ups from each group advanced to national round of 2018 Liga 3.

In the play-off round, third-placed teams on each group competed in a knockout round home and away tournament. Each winners advanced to national round of 2018 Liga 3.

== Schedule ==
The schedule of each round was as follows.

Round	Match date
Preliminary round	14 July – 23 September 2018
Play-off round	22 September – 7 October 2018

== Preliminary round ==
A total of 32 teams played in the preliminary round.

=== Group 1 ===
Pos	Team	Pld	W	D	L	GF	GA	GD	Pts	Qualification
1	757 Kepri Jaya	4	4	0	0	18	2	+16	12	Qualify to national round
2	PSBL	4	2	0	2	17	5	+12	6	Qualify to national round
3	Persih Masurai	4	0	0	4	1	29	−28	0	Advance to play-off round

Source: PSSI

14 July 2018
PSBL	1–3	757 Kepri Jaya	Langsa Stadium, Langsa
21 July 2018
Persih Masurai	0–6	PSBL	Bumi Masurai Stadium, Merangin
28 July 2018
757 Kepri Jaya	5–1	Persih Masurai	Gelora Citramas Stadium, Batam
25 August 2018
757 Kepri Jaya	2–0	PSBL	Gelora Citramas Stadium, Batam
1 September 2018
PSBL	10–0	Persih Masurai	Langsa Stadium, Langsa
8 September 2018
Persih Masurai	0–8	757 Kepri Jaya	Bumi Masurai Stadium, Merangin

=== Group 2 ===
Pos	Team	Pld	W	D	L	GF	GA	GD	Pts	Qualification
1	Bogor	5	3	2	0	10	2	+8	11	Qualify to national round
2	Lampung Sakti	6	2	3	1	10	5	+5	9	Qualify to national round
3	PSGC	6	2	1	3	6	11	−5	7	Advance to play-off round
4	Persikabo	5	1	0	4	4	12	−8	3	

Source: PSSI

15 July 2018
Bogor	4–0	Persikabo	Heri Sudrajat Stadium, Depok
22 July 2018
PSGC	1–1	Lampung Sakti	Galuh Stadium, Ciamis
28 July 2018
Persikabo	1–2	PSGC	Badak Putih Stadium, Cianjur
29 July 2018
Lampung Sakti	0–0	Bogor	Sumpah Pemuda Stadium, Bandar Lampung
5 August 2018
Bogor	2–0	PSGC	Heri Sudrajat Stadium, Depok
Persikabo	2–0	Lampung Sakti	Badak Putih Stadium, Cianjur
26 August 2018
Persikabo	DNF (Note: The match was stopped in the second half due to supporters' riot when the score was 1–1. The result of this match still TBD.)	Bogor	Badak Putih Stadium, Cianjur
Lampung Sakti	4–0	PSGC	Sumpah Pemuda Stadium, Bandar Lampung
2 September 2018
PSGC	3–1	Persikabo	Galuh Stadium, Ciamis
Bogor	2–2	Lampung Sakti	Heri Sudrajat Stadium, Depok
9 September 2018
PSGC	0–2	Bogor	Galuh Stadium, Ciamis
Lampung Sakti	3–0	Persikabo	Sumpah Pemuda Stadium, Bandar Lampung

=== Group 3 ===
Pos	Team	Pld	W	D	L	GF	GA	GD	Pts	Qualification
1	PSCS	6	5	1	0	7	1	+6	16	Qualify to national round
2	Persibas	6	2	2	2	3	2	+1	8	Qualify to national round
3	Persip	6	2	1	3	4	5	−1	7	Advance to play-off round
4	Persibangga	6	0	2	4	2	8	−6	2	

Source: PSSI

28 July 2018
Persip	2–0	Persibangga	Jenderal Hoegeng Stadium, Pekalongan
Persibas	0–0	PSCS	Satria Stadium, Purwokerto
4 August 2018
Persibangga	0–0	Persibas	Goentoer Darjono Stadium, Purbalingga
PSCS	1–0	Persip	Wijayakusuma Stadium, Cilacap
11 August 2018
Persip	1–0	Persibas	Jenderal Hoegeng Stadium, Pekalongan
Persibangga	0–1	PSCS	Goentoer Darjono Stadium, Purbalingga
25 August 2018
Persibangga	1–1	Persip	Goentoer Darjono Stadium, Purbalingga
PSCS	1–0	Persibas	Wijayakusuma Stadium, Cilacap
1 September 2018
Persibas	2–0	Persibangga	Satria Stadium, Purwokerto
Persip	0–2	PSCS	Jenderal Hoegeng Stadium, Pekalongan
8 September 2018
Persibas	1–0	Persip	Satria Stadium, Purwokerto
PSCS	2–1	Persibangga	Wijayakusuma Stadium, Cilacap

=== Group 4 ===
Pos	Team	Pld	W	D	L	GF	GA	GD	Pts	Qualification
1	Persijap	6	3	2	1	8	8	0	11	Qualify to national round
2	Persiba Bantul	6	3	1	2	15	10	+5	10	Qualify to national round
3	Persatu	6	2	2	2	10	6	+4	8	Advance to play-off round
4	Persipur	6	0	3	3	5	14	−9	3	

Source: PSSI

29 July 2018
Persiba Bantul	3–2	Persipur	Sultan Agung Stadium, Bantul
Persijap	2–1	Persatu	Gelora Bumi Kartini Stadium, Jepara
5 August 2018
Persipur	1–1	Persijap	Krida Bakti Stadium, Purwodadi
Persatu	3–2	Persiba Bantul	Loka Jaya Stadium, Tuban
12 August 2018
Persipur	0–0	Persatu	Krida Bakti Stadium, Purwodadi
19 August 2018
Persiba Bantul	5–0	Persijap	Sultan Agung Stadium, Bantul
26 August 2018
Persipur	2–2	Persiba Bantul	Krida Bakti Stadium, Purwodadi
Persatu	0–0	Persijap	Loka Jaya Stadium, Tuban
2 September 2018
Persijap	3–0	Persipur	Gelora Bumi Kartini Stadium, Jepara
Persiba Bantul	2–1	Persatu	Sultan Agung Stadium, Bantul
9 September 2018
Persijap	2–1	Persiba Bantul	Gelora Bumi Kartini Stadium, Jepara
Persatu	5–0	Persipur	Loka Jaya Stadium, Tuban

=== Group 5 ===
Pos	Team	Pld	W	D	L	GF	GA	GD	Pts	Qualification
1	PSBK	8	5	2	1	14	7	+7	17	Qualify to national round
2	Persik (Note: Persik were deducted three points due to FIFA sanction.)	8	5	3	0	13	4	+9	15	Qualify to national round
3	Persinga	8	3	3	2	13	5	+8	12	Advance to play-off round
4	Madiun Putra	8	1	2	5	4	13	−9	5	
5	Persipon	8	0	2	6	6	21	−15	2	

Source: PSSI
Notes:

14 July 2018
Persinga	2–0	PSBK	Ketonggo Stadium, Ngawi
Persik	2–0	Madiun Putra	Brawijaya Stadium, Kediri
21 July 2018
Persipon	0–0	Persinga	Sultan Syarif Abdurrahman Stadium, Pontianak
PSBK	0–0	Persik	Gelora Supriyadi Stadium, Blitar
28 July 2018
Madiun Putra	2–1	Persipon	Wilis Stadium, Madiun
Persinga	1–1	Persik	Ketonggo Stadium, Ngawi
4 August 2018
PSBK	2–0	Madiun Putra	Gelora Supriyadi Stadium, Blitar
Persik	2–1	Persipon	Brawijaya Stadium, Kediri
11 August 2018
Madiun Putra	0–0	Persinga	Wilis Stadium, Madiun
Persipon	1–2	PSBK	Sultan Syarif Abdurrahman Stadium, Pontianak
25 August 2018
PSBK	2–1	Persinga	Gelora Supriyadi Stadium, Blitar
Madiun Putra	0–2	Persik	Wilis Stadium, Madiun
1 September 2018
Persinga	6–0	Persipon	Ketonggo Stadium, Ngawi
Persik	2–2	PSBK	Brawijaya Stadium, Kediri
8 September 2018
Persipon	2–2	Madiun Putra	Sultan Syarif Abdurrahman Stadium, Pontianak
Persik	2–0	Persinga	Brawijaya Stadium, Kediri
15 September 2018
Madiun Putra	0–1	PSBK	Wilis Stadium, Madiun
Persipon	0–2	Persik	Sultan Syarif Abdurrahman Stadium, Pontianak
22 September 2018
Persinga	3–0	Madiun Putra	Ketonggo Stadium, Ngawi
PSBK	5–1	Persipon	Gelora Supriyadi Stadium, Blitar

=== Group 6 ===
Pos	Team	Pld	W	D	L	GF	GA	GD	Pts	Qualification
1	Persekam Metro	8	4	2	2	11	6	+5	14	Qualify to national round
2	Persekap	8	4	1	3	12	7	+5	13	Qualify to national round
3	Persida	8	3	2	3	10	11	−1	11	Advance to play-off round
4	Persepam (Note: Persepam were deducted three points due to FIFA sanction.)	8	3	3	2	6	7	−1	9	
5	PSBI	8	1	2	5	5	13	−8	5	

Source: PSSI
Notes:

15 July 2018
Persepam	1–0	Persekap	Gelora Ratu Pamelingan Stadium, Pamekasan
PSBI	1–1	Persekam Metro	Gelora Bumi Penataran Stadium, Blitar
22 July 2018
Persida	0–0	Persepam	Gelora Delta Stadium, Sidoarjo
Persekap	2–0	PSBI	Untung Suropati Stadium, Pasuruan
29 July 2018
Persekam Metro	3–1	Persida	Kanjuruhan Stadium, Malang
Persepam	1–1	PSBI	Gelora Ratu Pamelingan Stadium, Pamekasan
5 August 2018
Persekap	0–0	Persekam Metro	Untung Suropati Stadium, Pasuruan
PSBI	1–0	Persida	Gelora Bumi Penataran Stadium, Blitar
12 August 2018
Persekam Metro	1–0	Persepam	Kanjuruhan Stadium, Malang
Persida	2–3	Persekap	Gelora Delta Stadium, Sidoarjo
26 August 2018
Persekap	3–0	Persepam	Untung Suropati Stadium, Pasuruan
Persekam Metro	3–0	PSBI	Kanjuruhan Stadium, Malang
2 September 2018
Persepam	1–1	Persida	Gelora Ratu Pamelingan Stadium, Pamekasan
5 September 2018
PSBI	1–3	Persekap	Gelora Bumi Penataran Stadium, Blitar
9 September 2018
Persida	2–1	Persekam Metro	Gelora Delta Stadium, Sidoarjo
PSBI	0–1	Persepam	Gelora Bumi Penataran Stadium, Blitar
16 September 2018
Persekam Metro	1–0	Persekap	Kanjuruhan Stadium, Malang
Persida	2–1	PSBI	Gelora Delta Stadium, Sidoarjo
23 September 2018
Persepam	2–1	Persekam Metro	Gelora Ratu Pamelingan Stadium, Pamekasan
Persekap	1–2	Persida	Untung Suropati Stadium, Pasuruan

=== Group 7 ===
On 28 August 2018, PS West Sumbawa withdrew from the competition after 3 matches. The other teams' results against PS West Sumbawa was annulled.

Pos	Team	Pld	W	D	L	GF	GA	GD	Pts	Qualification
1	PS Badung	4	3	1	0	11	2	+9	10	Qualify to national round
2	Persewangi	4	1	2	1	4	5	−1	5	Qualify to national round
3	Perssu	4	0	1	3	1	9	−8	1	Advance to play-off round
4	PS West Sumbawa	0	0	0	0	0	0	0	0	Withdrew

Source: PSSI

28 July 2018
Perssu	0–0	Persewangi	Ahmad Yani Stadium, Sumenep
1 August 2018
Persewangi	2–2	PS Badung	Ahmad Yani Stadium, Sumenep
5 August 2018
Perssu	0–2	PS Badung	Ahmad Yani Stadium, Sumenep
30 August 2018
PS Badung	5–0	Perssu	Gelora Samudera Stadium, Kuta
2 September 2018
Persewangi	2–1	Perssu	Gelora Samudera Stadium, Kuta
5 September 2018
PS Badung	2–0	Persewangi	Gelora Samudera Stadium, Kuta

=== Group 8 ===
Pos	Team	Pld	W	D	L	GF	GA	GD	Pts	Qualification
1	Celebest	4	4	0	0	12	0	+12	12	Qualify to national round
2	Perseka	4	1	1	2	4	5	−1	4	Qualify to national round
3	Persbul	4	0	1	3	1	11	−10	−1	Disqualified

Source: PSSI

29 July 2018
Celebest	4–0	Persbul	Gawalise Stadium, Palu
1 August 2018
Persbul	1–1	Perseka	Gawalise Stadium, Palu
4 August 2018
Celebest	3–0	Perseka	Gawalise Stadium, Palu
14 October 2018
Perseka	3–0 (w/o) (Note: Persbul sanctioned lost 0–3, 1 point reduction each, and disqualified from the competition)	Persbul	Triton Stadium, Kaimana
17 October 2018
Persbul	0–3 (w/o)	Celebest	Triton Stadium, Kaimana
20 October 2018
Perseka	0–2	Celebest	Triton Stadium, Kaimana

== Play-off round ==
A total of eight teams played in the play-off round: third-placed teams on each group.

Team 1	Agg.	Team 2	1st leg	2nd leg
Persih Masurai	0–20	PSGC	0–7	0–13
Persip	1–2	Persatu	1–1	0–1
Persinga	3–2	Persida	2–0	1–2
Perssu	—	n/a (Note: Originally Persbul were advanced to play-off, but they were disqualified. So Perssu went through to national round.)	—	—

== Qualified teams ==
The following teams qualified from national zone route for the national round.

Qualified teams	Qualified as	Qualified on
757 Kepri Jaya	Group 1 winner	25 August 2018
PSCS	Group 3 winner	25 August 2018
PS Badung	Group 7 winner	30 August 2018
PSBL	Group 1 runner-up	1 September 2018
Persiba Bantul	Group 4 runner-up	2 September 2018
Persewangi	Group 7 runner-up	2 September 2018
Persekap	Group 6 runner-up	5 September 2018
Persibas	Group 3 runner-up	8 September 2018
Persik	Group 5 runner-up	8 September 2018
Persijap	Group 4 winner	9 September 2018
Bogor	Group 2 winner	9 September 2018
Lampung Sakti	Group 2 runner-up	9 September 2018
PSBK	Group 5 winner	15 September 2018
Persekam Metro	Group 6 winner	16 September 2018
Persatu	Play-off winner	7 October 2018
PSGC	Play-off winner	7 October 2018
Persinga	Play-off winner	7 October 2018
Celebest	Group 8 winner	20 October 2018
Perseka	Group 8 runner-up	25 October 2018
Perssu	Play-off winner	25 October 2018
