= List of football stadiums in Indonesia =

The following is the list of football stadiums in Indonesia, ordered by capacity.

== Current stadiums ==
=== Capacity of 20,000 and higher ===
| # | Image | Stadium | Capacity | City | Home team |
|---|---|---|---|---|---|
| 1 | | Jakarta International Stadium | 82,000 | Jakarta | Persija Jakarta |
| 2 | | Gelora Bung Karno Stadium | 78,000 | Jakarta | Indonesia national football team |
| 3 | | Gelora Bung Tomo Stadium | 46,806 | Surabaya | Persebaya Surabaya |
| 4 | | Riau Main Stadium | 43,923 | Pekanbaru | PSPS Pekanbaru |
| 5 | | Lukas Enembe Stadium | 40,263 | Jayapura | Persipura Jayapura |
| 6 | | Batakan Stadium | 40,000 | Balikpapan | Persiba Balikpapan |
| 7 | | Gelora Bandung Lautan Api Stadium | 38,000 | Bandung | Persib Bandung |
| 8 | | Aji Imbut Stadium | 35,000 | Kutai Kartanegara | Mitra Kukar |
| 9 | | Palaran Stadium | 35,000 | Samarinda | Borneo Samarinda |
| 10 | | Banten International Stadium | 30,000 | Serang | Dewa United Banten |
| 11 | | Mandala Stadium | 30,000 | Jayapura | Persipura Jayapura |
| 12 | | Moch. Soebroto Stadium | 30,000 | Magelang | PPSM Magelang |
| 13 | | Pakansari Stadium | 30,000 | Bogor | Persikabo 1973 |
| 14 | | Patriot Candrabhaga Stadium | 30,000 | Bekasi | Adhyaksa Bekasi; Persipasi Kota Bekasi |
| 15 | | Sultan Agung Stadium | 30,000 | Bantul | Persiba Bantul |
| 16 | | Wibawa Mukti Stadium | 30,000 | Bekasi | Persikasi Bekasi |
| 17 | | Jalak Harupat Stadium | 27,000 | Bandung | Persikab Bandung |
| 18 | | North Sumatra Main Stadium | 25,750 | Deli Serdang | PSMS Medan |
| 19 | | Gajayana Stadium | 25,000 | Malang | Persema Malang |
| 20 | | Gelora Joko Samudro Stadium | 25,000 | Gresik | Gresik United |
| 21 | | Kaharudin Nasution Rumbai Stadium | 25,000 | Pekanbaru | PSPS Pekanbaru |
| 22 | | Kuantan Singingi Sport Centre Stadium | 25,000 | Kuantan Singingi | Persiks Kuantan Singingi |
| 23 | | Mandala Krida Stadium | 25,000 | Yogyakarta | PSIM Yogyakarta |
| 24 | | Mandala Remaja Stadium | 25,000 | Ambon | PSA Ambon |
| 25 | | Petrokimia Stadium | 25,000 | Gresik | Gresik United |
| 26 | | Siliwangi Stadium | 25,000 | Bandung | Bandung United |
| 27 | | Singaperbangsa Stadium | 25,000 | Karawang | Persika Karawang; Persika 1951 |
| 28 | | Wilis Stadium | 25,000 | Madiun | PSM Madiun |
| 29 | | Jatidiri Stadium | 25,000 | Semarang | PSIS Semarang |
| 30 | | Taman Prestasi Stadium | 25,000 | Bontang | Bontang F.C. |
| 31 | | Gelora Sriwijaya Stadium | 23,000 | Palembang | Sriwijaya |
| 32 | | Kanjuruhan Stadium | 21,700 | Malang | Arema |
| 33 | | Maguwoharjo Stadium | 20,594 | Sleman | PSS Sleman |
| 34 | | Galuh Stadium | 20,000 | Ciamis | PSGC Ciamis |
| 35 | | Gawalise Stadium | 20,000 | Palu | Persipal Palu |
| 36 | | Gelora 10 November Stadium | 20,000 | Surabaya | de Red |
| 37 | | Gelora Bumi Kartini Stadium | 20,000 | Jepara | Persijap Jepara |
| 38 | | Hoegeng Stadium | 20,000 | Pekalongan | Persip Pekalongan |
| 39 | | Jember Sport Garden Stadium | 20,000 | Jember | Persid Jember |
| 40 | | Manahan Stadium | 20,000 | Surakarta | Persis Solo |
| 41 | | Sri Maharaja Stadium | 20,000 | Tebo | Persiteb Tebo |
| 42 | | Swarnabhumi Stadium | 20,000 | Jambi | Persijam Jambi |
| 43 | | Teladan Stadium | 20,000 | Medan | PSMS Medan |
| 44 | | Tunas Bangsa Stadium | 20,000 | Lhokseumawe | PSLS Lhokseumawe |

=== Capacity below 20,000 ===
| # | Image | Stadium | Capacity | City | Home team |
|---|---|---|---|---|---|
| 1 | | Gelora Delta Stadium | 19,467 | Sidoarjo | Deltras Sidoarjo |
| 2 | | Harapan Bangsa Stadium | 18,000 | Banda Aceh | Persiraja Banda Aceh |
| 3 | | Kapten I Wayan Dipta Stadium | 18,000 | Gianyar | Bali United |
| 4 | | Segiri Stadium | 16,000 | Samarinda | Borneo Samarinda |
| 5 | | Surajaya Stadium | 16,000 | Lamongan | Persela Lamongan |
| 6 | | Baharuddin Siregar Stadium | 15,000 | Deli Serdang | PSDS Deli Serdang |
| 7 | | Barnabas Youwe Stadium | 15,000 | Jayapura | Persidafon Dafonsoro |
| 8 | | Bima Stadium | 15,000 | Cirebon | PSGJ Cirebon |
| 9 | | Cendrawasih Stadium | 15,000 | Biak Numfor | PSBS Biak |
| 10 | | Diponegoro Stadium | 15,000 | Banyuwangi | Persewangi Banyuwangi |
| 11 | | Gelora Bangkalan Stadium | 15,000 | Bangkalan | Perseba Bangkalan |
| 12 | | Gelora Geger Stadium | 15,000 | Cilegon | Persigon Cilegon |
| 13 | | Gelora Kie Raha Stadium | 15,000 | Ternate | Persiter Ternate |
| 14 | | Gelora Supriyadi Stadium | 15,000 | Blitar | PSBI Blitar |
| 15 | | Goentoer Darjono Stadium | 15,000 | Purbalingga | Persibangga Purbalingga |
| 16 | | Indomilk Arena | 15,000 | Tangerang | Persita Tangerang |
| 17 | | Kamal Djunaedi Stadium | 15,000 | Jepara | Persijap Jepara |
| 18 | | Kebon Dalem Stadium | 15,000 | Kendal | Persik Kendal |
| 19 | | Letjen Haji Sudirman Stadium | 15,000 | Bojonegoro | Persibo Bojonegoro |
| 20 | | Manakarra Stadium | 15,000 | Mamuju | Persimaju Mamuju |
| 21 | | Maulana Yusuf Stadium | 15,000 | Serang | Perserang Serang |
| 22 | | Moh Sarengat Stadium | 15,000 | Batang | Persibat Batang |
| 23 | | Notohadinegoro Stadium | 15,000 | Jember | Persid Jember |
| 24 | | Pahoman Stadium | 15,000 | Bandar Lampung | Nusantara Lampung |
| 25 | | Pandan Arang Stadium | 15,000 | Boyolali | Persebi Boyolali |
| 26 | | Persikabo Stadium | 15,000 | Bogor | Persikabo Bogor |
| 27 | | Semarak Stadium | 15,000 | Bengkulu | PS Bengkulu |
| 28 | | Semeru Stadium | 15,000 | Lumajang | PSIL Lumajang |
| 29 | | Sempaja Stadium | 15,000 | Samarinda | Persisam United |
| 30 | | Wergu Wetan Stadium | 15,000 | Kudus | Persiku Kudus |
| 31 | | Wijayakusuma Stadium | 15,000 | Cilacap | PSCS Cilacap |
| 32 | | Gelora Ratu Pamelingan Stadium | 13,500 | Pamekasan | Madura United |
| 33 | | Krida Bakti Stadium | 12,000 | Grobogan | Persipur Purwodadi |
| 34 | | Mulawarman Stadium | 12,000 | Bontang | Bontang |
| 35 | | 17th May Stadium | 12,000 | Banjarmasin | Barito Putera |
| 36 | | Ngurah Rai Stadium | 12,000 | Denpasar | Perseden Denpasar |
| 37 | | Tridadi Stadium | 12,000 | Sleman | Sleman United |
| 38 | | Abu Bakrin Stadium | 10,000 | Magelang | Persikama Magelang |
| 39 | | Ambang Stadium | 10,000 | Kotamobagu | Persibom Bolaang Mongondow; Persikokot Kotamobagu |
| 40 | | Anjukladang Stadium | 10,000 | Nganjuk | Persenga Nganjuk |
| 41 | | Beringin Stadium | 10,000 | Indragiri Hilir | Persih Tembilahan |
| 42 | | Brawijaya Stadium | 10,000 | Kediri | Persik Kediri |
| 43 | | Chandradimuka Stadium | 10,000 | Kebumen | Persak Kebumen |
| 44 | | Gelora Handayani Stadium | 10,000 | Gunung Kidul | Persig Gunungkidul |
| 45 | | Gentung Temiang Stadium | 10,000 | Tanah Grogot | Paser United |
| 46 | | Kamal Muara Stadium | 10,000 | Jakarta | Jakarta City |
| 47 | | Ketonggo Stadium | 10,000 | Ngawi | Persinga Ngawi |
| 48 | | Klabat Stadium | 10,000 | Manado | Sulut United |
| 49 | | Krida Stadium | 10,000 | Rembang | PSIR Rembang |
| 50 | | Lagaligo Stadium | 10,000 | Palopo | Gaspa 1958 |
| 51 | | Maesa Tondano Stadium | 10,000 | Minahasa | Persmin Minahasa |
| 52 | | Mashud Wisnusaputra Stadium | 10,000 | Kuningan | Pesik Kuningan |
| 53 | | Merdeka Stadium | 10,000 | Gorontalo | Kreasindo Rajawali Sultan |
| 54 | | R. Soedarsono Stadium | 10,000 | Pasuruan | Persekabpas Pasuruan |
| 55 | | Purnawarman Stadium | 10,000 | Purwakarta | Persipo Purwakarta |
| 56 | | Sanggeng Stadium | 10,000 | Manokwari | Perseman Manokwari |
| 57 | | Tuah Pahoe Stadium | 10,000 | Palangka Raya | Isenmulang Kalteng; Kalteng Putra |
| 58 | | Tuanku Tambusai Stadium | 10,000 | Kampar | PSBS Bangkinang |

=== Capacity below 10,000 ===
| # | Image | Stadium | Capacity | City | Home team |
|---|---|---|---|---|---|
| 1 | | Madya Stadium | 9,170 | Jakarta | Indonesian Athletics Association |
| 2 | | Gelora B.J. Habibie Stadium | 8,547 | Parepare | PSM Makassar |
| 3 | | H. Dimurthala Stadium | 8,000 | Banda Aceh | Persiraja Banda Aceh |
| 4 | | Demang Lehman Stadium | 7,200 | Banjar Regency | Persemar Martapura |
| 5 | | Sumpah Pemuda Stadium | 7,159 | Bandar Lampung | Bhayangkara Presisi Lampung F.C. |
| 6 | | Bumi Sriwijaya Stadium | 6,051 | Palembang | PS Palembang |

=== Demolished stadium ===
| # | Image | Stadium | Capacity | City | Former home team | Opened | Demolished |
|---|---|---|---|---|---|---|---|
| 1 | | Andi Mattalata Stadium | 15,000 | Makassar | PSM Makassar (1957–2020) | 1957 | 2020 |
| 2 | | Ikada Stadium | 15,000 | Jakarta | Indonesia national football team (1951–1963) | 1951 | 1963 |
| 3 | | Lebak Bulus Stadium | 12,800 | Jakarta | Persija Jakarta (1998–2007) | 1987 | 2013 |
| 4 | | Menteng Stadium | 10,000 | Jakarta | Persija Jakarta (1961–2000) | 1921 | 2013 |
| 5 | | Persiba Stadium | 12,500 | Balikpapan | Persiba Balikpapan (1987–2017) | 1985 | 2017 |

=== Future stadium ===
| # | Image | Stadium | Capacity | City | Status | Construction | Opening |
|---|---|---|---|---|---|---|---|
| 1 | | Kalsel Main Stadium | 30,046 | Banjarbaru | Preparation | 2026 | 2028 |
| 2 | | Sudiang Stadium | 27,000 | Makassar | Under Construction | 2026 | 2028 |
| 3 | | Gelora Daha Jayati Stadium | 18,000 | Kediri | Under Construction | 2023 | 2027 |
| 4 | | Untia Stadium | 16,000 | Makassar | Under Construction | 2026 | 2028 |
| 5 | | Kendal Tornado Stadium | 10.000 | Kendal | Preparation | 2027 | 2029 |

== See also ==
- List of Asian stadiums by capacity
- List of association football stadiums by capacity
- List of association football stadiums by country
- List of sports venues by capacity
- Lists of stadiums
- Football in Indonesia
