= 2015 Liga Indonesia Premier Division =

Liga Indonesia Premier Division
- Season: 2015
- Matches: 1
- Goals: 4 (4 per match)
- Top goalscorer: (Indonesia) Mansyur (2 goals)
- Biggest home win: Persikad 3–1 Persires (26 April 2015)
- Highest scoring: Persikad 3–1 Persires (26 April 2015)

The 2015 Liga Indonesia Premier Division season was the 20th edition of Liga Indonesia Premier Division and the seventh edition as a second-tier competition.

On November 3, 2014, PSSI announced that starting this season, teams are not allowed to use foreign players and only allowed to have a maximum of 30 players. It was planned to start the season in March 2015 but it was revised to start the season on February 19, 2015. The start of the season was again revised to start in mid-April. On April 20, 2015, it was confirmed that the season will start on April 26, 2015.

This season was officially discontinued by PSSI on May 2, 2015, due to a ban by Imam Nahrawi, Minister of Youth and Sports Affairs, against PSSI to run any football competition. Only one match was successfully played before the ban was put on place.

== Format ==
This year the competition will divided into six groups containing tens teams, the top two teams from each group will qualify for the next round, meanwhile the five lowest team from each group will be relegated to Liga Nusantara next season, this is done to reduce participants to 32 clubs in the 2016 season.

== Teams ==
Persiba Bantul, Persijap Jepara, Persita Tangerang and Persepam Madura Utama will participate this season, having been relegated from Indonesia Super League. Cilegon United and Persibat Batang are teams promoted from Liga Indonesia First Division. Laga FC, Persatu Tuban, Perssu Sumenep, PS Badung, Perserang Serang and Persibas Banyumas are teams promoted from Liga Nusantara.

Persiwa Wamena will still play in the Liga Indonesia Premier Division despite gaining promotion in the 2014 Liga Indonesia Premier Division, after they did not pass the verification process for the 2015 Indonesia Super League. Persik Kediri will also compete in the Liga Indonesia Premier Division, because they fail to pass the verification process.

On April 20, 2015, Persiwa Wamena and Persik Kediri decided to pull out from the competition, joining PSBS Biak and Persifa Fak-fak who failed the verification process.

=== Stadium and locations ===
Locations of the teams in the 2015 Liga Indonesia Premier Division
Locations of the teams in the 2015 Liga Indonesia Premier Division from Java

Club	Regency or City	Province	Stadium	Capacity	2014 season
PS Bintang Jaya Asahan	Asahan	North Sumatra	Mutiara Kisaran	10,000	First round in Premier Division
PSBL Langsa	Langsa	Aceh	Langsa	8,000	First round in Premier Division
PSMS Medan	Medan	North Sumatra	Teladan	20,000	First round in Premier Division
Persiraja Banda Aceh	Banda Aceh	Aceh	Haji Dimurthala	20,000	First round in Premier Division
Persih Tembilahan	Indragiri Hilir	Riau	Beringin	5,000	First round in Premier Division
Persikad Depok	Depok	West Java	Merpati	1,000	First round in Premier Division
PS Bengkulu	Bengkulu	Bengkulu	Semarak	15,000	First round in Premier Division
Villa 2000	South Tangerang	Banten	Gelora 19 Agustus	10,000	First round in Premier Division
Persika Karawang	Karawang	West Java	Singaperbangsa	25,000	First round in Premier Division
Persibangga Purbalingga	Purbalingga	Central Java	Goentoer Darjono	15,000	First round in Premier Division
Persipon Pontianak	Pontianak	West Kalimantan	Sultan Syarif Abdurrahman	15,000	First round in Premier Division
Persip Pekalongan	Pekalongan	Central Java	Hoegeng	20,000	First round in Premier Division
Persipur Purwodadi	Purwodadi	Central Java	Krida Bakti	12,000	First round in Premier Division
Persires Sukoharjo	Sukoharjo Regency	Central Java	Gelora Merdeka Jombor		First round in Premier Division
PPSM Sakti Magelang	Magelang	Central Java	Abu Bakrin	10,000	First round in Premier Division
PSIR Rembang	Rembang Regency	Central Java	Krida	7,000	First round in Premier Division
PSBI Blitar	Blitar	East Java	Aryo Srengat	6,000	First round in Premier Division
PSBK Blitar	Blitar Regency	East Java	Gelora Supriyadi	15,000	First round in Premier Division
PSIM Yogyakarta	Yogyakarta	Yogyakarta	Mandala Krida	25,000	First round in Premier Division
Madiun Putra	Madiun	East Java	Wilis	25,000	First round in Premier Division
Kalteng Putra	Palangkaraya	Central Kalimantan	Tuah Pahoe	5,000	First round in Premier Division
Mojokerto Putra	Mojokerto	East Java	Gajahmada	10,000	First round in Premier Division
Persekap Pasuruan	Pasuruan	East Java	Untung Suropati	5,000	First round in Premier Division
Persida Sidoarjo	Sidoarjo	East Java	Gelora Delta	35,000	First round in Premier Division
Persbul Buol	Buol	Central Sulawesi	Kuonoto	3,000	First round in Premier Division
Metro FC	Malang Regency	East Java	Kanjuruhan	40,000	First round in Premier Division
Persigo Gorontalo	Gorontalo	Gorontalo	Merdeka	10,000	First round in Premier Division
PS Sumbawa Barat	West Sumbawa	West Nusa Tenggara	Lalu Magaparang	15,000	First round in Premier Division
Yahukimo FC	Yahukimo	Papua	Andi Mattalatta	20,000	First round in Premier Division
Persiba Bantul	Bantul Regency	Yogyakarta	Sultan Agung	30,000	Relegated from Super League
Persijap Jepara	Jepara Regency	Central Java	Gelora Bumi Kartini	25,000	Relegated from Super League
Persepam Madura Utama	Pamekasan Regency	East Java	Gelora Bangkalan	15,000	Relegated from Super League
Persita Tangerang	Karawang Regency	West Java	Singaperbangsa	25,000	Relegated from Super League
Cilegon United F.C.	Cilegon	Banten	Krakatau Steel	25,000	Promoted from Liga Indonesia First Division
Persibat Batang	Batang Regency	Central Java	Moh Sarengat	15,000	Promoted from Liga Indonesia First Division
Persewangi Banyuwangi	Banyuwangi	East Java	Diponegoro	10,000	Second round in Premier Division
Persebo Bondowoso	Bondowoso	East Java	Semeru	25,000	Second round in Premier Division
Persinga Ngawi	Ngawi; Madiun	East Java	Ketonggo; Wilis	6,000; 25,000	Second round in Premier Division
Pro Duta FC	Medan	North Sumatra	Teladan	20,000	Second round in Premier Division
Persigubin Gunung Bintang	Pegunungan Bintang	Papua	Barnabas Youwe	15,000	Second round in Premier Division
Persikabo Bogor	Bogor Regency	West Java	Pakansari; Persikabo	30,000; 15,000	Second round in Premier Division
PSPS Pekanbaru	Pekanbaru	Riau	Kaharudin Nasution	25,000	Second round in Premier Division
PS Bangka	Bangka Regency	Bangka-Belitung	Orom	7,000	Second round in Premier Division
Persis Solo	Surakarta	Central Java	Manahan	25,000	Third round in Premier Division
PSCS Cilacap	Cilacap	Central Java	Wijayakusuma	15,000	Third round in Premier Division
PSIS Semarang	Semarang	Central Java	Jatidiri	25,000	Third round in Premier Division
PSS Sleman	Sleman	Yogyakarta	Maguwoharjo	40,000	Third round in Premier Division
PSGC Ciamis	Ciamis	West Java	Galuh	10,000	Semifinal in Premier Division
Martapura FC	Banjar	South Kalimantan	Demang Lehman	15,000	Semifinal in Premier Division
Laga FC		East Java			Promoted from Liga Nusantara
Persatu Tuban	Tuban	East Java	Loka Jaya Stadium	2,000	Promoted from Liga Nusantara
Perssu Sumenep	Sumenep	East Java	Ahmad Yani	15,000	Promoted from Liga Nusantara
PS Badung	Badung	Bali	Gelora Samudra		Promoted from Liga Nusantara
Perserang Serang	Serang	Banten	Maulana Yusuf	15,000	Promoted from Liga Nusantara
Persibas Banyumas	Banyumas	Central Java	Satria	8,000	Promoted from Liga Nusantara

== First round ==
This round will start on 26 April 2015 until 10 September 2015 with 55 teams competing.

=== Group 1 ===
Pos	Team	Pld	W	D	L	GF	GA	GD	Pts	Qualification or relegation	PBA	PSL	MED	PRO	BIN	PEK	TEM	BEN	BAN
1	Persiraja Banda Aceh	0	0	0	0	0	0	0	0	Qualification to Second round	—								
2	PSBL Langsa	0	0	0	0	0	0	0	0	Qualification to Second round		—							
3	PSMS Medan	0	0	0	0	0	0	0	0				—						
4	Pro Duta FC	0	0	0	0	0	0	0	0					—					
5	PS Bintang Jaya Asahan	0	0	0	0	0	0	0	0						—				
6	PSPS Pekanbaru	0	0	0	0	0	0	0	0							—			
7	Persih Tembilahan	0	0	0	0	0	0	0	0								—		
8	PS Bengkulu	0	0	0	0	0	0	0	0									—	
9	PS Bangka	0	0	0	0	0	0	0	0										—

First match(es) will be played: 26 April 2015. Source: Liga Indonesia
Rules for classification: 1) points; 2) goal difference; 3) number of goals scored.

=== Group 2 ===
Pos	Team	Pld	W	D	L	GF	GA	GD	Pts	Qualification or relegation	PUR	CLU	SER	TGR	VIL	BOG	KAR	CIA	CIL	SKH
1	Persikad Purwakarta	1	1	0	0	3	1	+2	3	Qualification to Second round	—									3–1
2	Cilegon United	0	0	0	0	0	0	0	0	Qualification to Second round		—								
3	Perserang Serang	0	0	0	0	0	0	0	0				—							
4	Persita Tangerang	0	0	0	0	0	0	0	0					—						
5	Villa 2000	0	0	0	0	0	0	0	0						—					
6	Persikabo Bogor	0	0	0	0	0	0	0	0							—				
7	Persika Karawang	0	0	0	0	0	0	0	0								—			
8	PSGC Ciamis	0	0	0	0	0	0	0	0									—		
9	PSCS Cilacap	0	0	0	0	0	0	0	0										—	
10	Persires Sukoharjo	1	0	0	1	1	3	−2	0											—

Updated to match(es) played on 26 April 2015. Source: Liga Indonesia
Rules for classification: 1) points; 2) goal diffeSKHce; 3) number of goals scored.

=== Group 3 ===
Pos	Team	Pld	W	D	L	GF	GA	GD	Pts	Qualification or relegation	PUB	BYM	BAT	KAL	SMR	KAR	PUR	REM	SOL	MAG
1	Persibangga Purbalingga	0	0	0	0	0	0	0	0	Qualification to Second round	—									
2	Persibas Banyumas	0	0	0	0	0	0	0	0	Qualification to Second round		—								
3	Persibat Batang	0	0	0	0	0	0	0	0				—							
4	Persip Pekalongan	0	0	0	0	0	0	0	0					—						
5	PSIS Semarang	0	0	0	0	0	0	0	0						—					
6	Persijap Jepara	0	0	0	0	0	0	0	0							—				
7	Persipur Purwodadi	0	0	0	0	0	0	0	0								—			
8	PSIR Rembang	0	0	0	0	0	0	0	0									—		
9	Persis Solo	0	0	0	0	0	0	0	0										—	
10	PPSM Sakti Magelang	0	0	0	0	0	0	0	0											—

First match(es) will be played: 26 April 2015. Source: Liga Indonesia
Rules for classification: 1) points; 2) goal difference; 3) number of goals scored.

=== Group 4 ===
Pos	Team	Pld	W	D	L	GF	GA	GD	Pts	Qualification or relegation	SLE	BAN	YOG	NGA	TUB	MAP	BLI	MOJ	MAD
1	PSS Sleman	0	0	0	0	0	0	0	0	Qualification to Second round	—								
2	Persiba Bantul	0	0	0	0	0	0	0	0	Qualification to Second round		—							
3	PSIM Yogyakarta	0	0	0	0	0	0	0	0				—						
4	Persinga Ngawi	0	0	0	0	0	0	0	0					—					
5	Persatu Tuban	0	0	0	0	0	0	0	0						—				
6	Madiun Putra FC	0	0	0	0	0	0	0	0							—			
7	PSBI Blitar	0	0	0	0	0	0	0	0								—		
8	PS Mojokerto Putra	0	0	0	0	0	0	0	0									—	
9	Persepam Madura United	0	0	0	0	0	0	0	0										—

First match(es) will be played: 26 April 2015. Source: Liga Indonesia
Rules for classification: 1) points; 2) goal difference; 3) number of goals scored.

=== Group 5 ===
Pos	Team	Pld	W	D	L	GF	GA	GD	Pts	Qualification or relegation	BLI	LAG	SID	SUM	MET	PAS	BON	BAN	BAD	SBA
1	PSBK Blitar	0	0	0	0	0	0	0	0	Qualification to Second round	—									
2	Laga FC	0	0	0	0	0	0	0	0	Qualification to Second round		—								
3	Persida Sidoarjo	0	0	0	0	0	0	0	0				—							
4	Perssu Sumenep	0	0	0	0	0	0	0	0					—						
5	Persekam Metro FC	0	0	0	0	0	0	0	0						—					
6	Persekap Pasuruan	0	0	0	0	0	0	0	0							—				
7	Persebo Bondowoso	0	0	0	0	0	0	0	0								—			
8	Persewangi Banyuwangi	0	0	0	0	0	0	0	0									—		
9	PS Badung	0	0	0	0	0	0	0	0										—	
10	PS Sumbawa Barat	0	0	0	0	0	0	0	0											—

First match(es) will be played: 26 April 2015. Source: Liga Indonesia
Rules for classification: 1) points; 2) goal difference; 3) number of goals scored.

=== Group 6 ===
Pos	Team	Pld	W	D	L	GF	GA	GD	Pts	Qualification or relegation	PON	KAL	MAR	BUO	GOR	YAH	GBI
1	Persipon Pontianak	0	0	0	0	0	0	0	0	Qualification to Second round	—						
2	Kalteng Putra FC	0	0	0	0	0	0	0	0	Qualification to Second round		—					
3	Martapura FC	0	0	0	0	0	0	0	0				—				
4	Persbul Buol	0	0	0	0	0	0	0	0					—			
5	Persigo Gorontalo	0	0	0	0	0	0	0	0						—		
6	Yahukimo FC	0	0	0	0	0	0	0	0							—	
7	Persigubin Gunung Bintang	0	0	0	0	0	0	0	0								—

First match(es) will be played: 26 April 2015. Source: Liga Indonesia
Rules for classification: 1) points; 2) goal difference; 3) number of goals scored.

== See also ==
- 2015 Indonesia Super League
- 2015 Liga Nusantara
- 2015 Indonesia Super League U-21
- 2015 Piala Indonesia
