= 2022 Liga 3 East Java =

Tournament details
- Country: Indonesia
- Teams: 58
- Qualified for: National Round

The 2022 Liga 3 East Java is the seventh season of Liga 3 East Java as a qualifying round for the national round of the 2022–23 Liga 3.

NZR Sumbersari are the defending champions after winning it in the 2021 season.

== Teams ==
2022 Liga 3 East Java was attended by 58 teams.

Regencies	Clubs
Banyuwangi	Banyuwangi Putra
Banyuwangi	Persewangi
Bojonegoro	Bojonegoro
Bojonegoro	Persibo
Blitar	Blitar Poetra
Blitar	PSBI
Blitar	PSBK
Blitar	PSBR
Bondowoso	Persebo Muda
Gresik	Persegres Putra
Jember	Persid
Jember	PS Unmuh Jember
Kediri	Persedikab
Kediri	Triple's Kediri
Lumajang	PSIL
Madiun	Persekama
Magetan	Persemag
Malang	Kanjuruhan
Malang	Persekam
Malang	Singhasari
Mojokerto	AC Majapahit
Mojokerto	PSMP Mojekerto
Nganjuk	Nganjuk Ladang
Ngawi	Persinga

Regencies	Clubs
Pacitan	Perspa
Pamekasan	Pamekasan Putra Tri Brata
Pamekasan	Persepam
Pasuruan	Assyabaab Bangil
Pasuruan	Pasuruan United
Pasuruan	Persekabpas
Ponorogo	Persepon
Ponorogo	PS Hizbul Wathan Ponorogo
Sampang	Persesa
Sidoarjo	Persida
Situbondo	PSSS
Sumenep	Perssu
Trenggalek	Persiga
Tuban	Bumi Wali
Tuban	Persatu
Tulungagung	Akademi Arema Ngunut
Tulungagung	Naga Emas Asri
Tulungagung	Perseta

Cities	Clubs
Madiun	Madiun Putra
Madiun	PSM
Malang	Arema Indonesia
Malang	ASIFA
Malang	Gestra Paranane
Malang	NZR Sumbersari
Malang	Malang United
Mojokerto	Persem
Probolinggo	Persipro 1950
Surabaya	Arek Suroboyo (PSAD)
Surabaya	Bajol Ijo
Surabaya	Kresna
Surabaya	Mitra Surabaya
Surabaya	PS Surabaya Muda
Surabaya	Sang Maestro
Surabaya	Suryanaga Connection

=== Name changes ===
- FC Maestro change its name to Sang Maestro.
- Pamekasan FC change its name to Pamekasan Putra Tri Brata.
- AFA Syailendra relocated to Pasuruan and were renamed to Pasuruan United.
- PSPK Pasuruan relocated to Jember and were renamed to PS Unmuh Jember.
- SWIs Magetan relocated to Ponorogo and were renamed to PS Hizbul Wathan Ponorogo.
