= List of East Java major league professional sports teams =

This is a list of East Java major league professional sports teams.

List of East Java major league professional sports teams
Club	Sport	League	Based
Arema FC	Football	Liga 1	Malang
Blitar United	Football	Liga 2	Blitar
CLS Knights	Basketball	ASEAN Basketball League	Surabaya
Deltras	Football	Liga 3	Sidoarjo
Gresik United	Football	Liga 3	Gresik
Madura F.C.	Football	Liga 2	Sumenep
Madura United	Football	Liga 1	Pamekasan
Pacific Cesar	Basketball	Indonesian Basketball League	Surabaya
Persatu	Football	Liga 3	Tuban
Persebaya	Football	Liga 1	Surabaya
Persela	Football	Liga 1	Lamongan
Persema	Football	Liga 3	Malang
Perseta	Football	Liga 3	Tulungagung
Persewangi	Football	Liga 3	Banyuwangi
Persibo	Football	Liga 3	Bojonegoro
Persik	Football	Liga 1	Kediri
Semeru F.C.	Football	Liga 2	Lumajang
