= Obet =

Obet could refer to:

- Tropical Depression Obet, a tropical depression over the Philippine Sea in October 2022
- Obet Yulius (born 1995), Indonesian footballer
- Victim (2022 film) (Czech: Oběť), 2022 thriller film
