= Roni Tri Prasnanto =

Indonesian footballer

Personal information
- Full name: Roni Tri Prasnanto
- Date of birth: 12 December 1985 (age 40)
- Place of birth: Banyuwangi, Indonesia
- Height: 5 ft 9 in (1.75 m)
- Position: Goalkeeper

Senior career*
Years	Team	Apps	(Gls)
2001–2008	Persekabpas Pasuruan		
2005	→ Persiba Bantul		
2008–2009	Persitara Jakarta Utara		
2009–2010	Persija Jakarta	7	(0)
2011–2012	Persela Lamongan		
2012–2013	Bhayangkara F.C.		
2014–2016	Persela Lamongan	3	(0)

International career
2005	Indonesia U-20		
2003–2007	Indonesia U-23		

Managerial career
- 2019–2020: PSM Madiun
- 2022–: Madiun Putra
- * Club domestic league appearances and goals

Roni Tri Prasnanto (born 12 December 1985) is an Indonesian football coach and former player who is currently head coach of Liga 3 club Madiun Putra. He previously coached another Madiun-based club, PSM Madiun from 2019 to 2020.
