= Obet Yulius =

Indonesian footballer (born 1995)

Obet Rivaldo
Personal information
- Full name: Obet Rivaldo Yulius
- Date of birth: 22 July 1995 (age 31)
- Place of birth: Tulungagung, Indonesia
- Height: 1.69 m (5 ft 7 in)
- Position: Defensive midfielder

Team information
- Current team: PSM Madiun
- Number: 10

Senior career*
Years	Team	Apps	(Gls)
2016	Laga	8	(1)
2016–2018	Persegres Gresik	25	(5)
2018	Madura	6	(2)
2019	Persatu Tuban	6	(0)
2020	Persekat Tegal	0	(0)
2021	Hizbul Wathan	5	(0)
2024–	PSM Madiun	9	(1)
- * Club domestic league appearances and goals

Obet Rivaldo Yulius (born 22 July 1995) is an Indonesian professional footballer who plays as a defensive midfielder for Liga Nusantara club PSM Madiun.

== Club career ==
=== Persekat Tegal ===
He was signed for Persekat Tegal to play in Liga 2 in the 2020 season.

=== Hizbul Wathan FC ===
In 2021, Obet signed a contract with Indonesian Liga 2 club Hizbul Wathan. He made his league debut on 27 September against Persijap Jepara.
