= Isdiantono =

Indonesian footballer

Personal information
- Date of birth: 8 November 1978 (age 48)
- Place of birth: Banyuwangi, Indonesia
- Height: 1.70 m (5 ft 7 in)
- Position: Defender

Team information
- Current team: Persewangi Banyuwangi (Head coach)

Senior career*
Years	Team	Apps	(Gls)
1998–2002	Gelora Dewata	43	(3)
2003–2007	Arema Indonesia	69	(2)
2008–2010	Persijap Jepara	57	(1)
2010–2014	Persisam Putra	56	(0)
Total		225	(6)

Managerial career
- 2021–: Persewangi Banyuwangi
- * Club domestic league appearances and goals

Isdiantono (born 8 November 1978, in Banyuwangi) is an Indonesian former footballer who is currently the head coach of Persewangi Banyuwangi in the Liga 3.

== Club statistics ==
Club	Season	Super League		Premier Division		Piala Indonesia		Total	
Club	Season	Apps	Goals	Apps	Goals	Apps	Goals	Apps	Goals
Persijap Jepara	2008-09	30	0	-		4	0	34	0
Persijap Jepara	2009-10	27	1	-		4	0	31	1
Persisam Putra Samarinda	2010-11	19	0	-		-		19	0
Persisam Putra Samarinda	2011-12	22	0	-		-		22	0
Total		98	1	-		8	0	106	1
