= Trubus Gunawan =

Indonesian footballer

Personal information
- Full name: Trubus Gunawan
- Date of birth: November 11, 1980 (age 45)
- Place of birth: Banyuwangi, Indonesia
- Height: 1.68 m (5 ft 6 in)
- Position: Forward

Senior career*
Years	Team	Apps	(Gls)
2007–2009	PS Mojokerto Putra	35	(14)
2009–2013	Deltras Sidoarjo	58	(12)
2014–2019	Persewangi Banyuwangi	47	(16)
2021–2022	Banyuwangi Putra	4	(0)
- * Club domestic league appearances and goals

Trubus Gunawan (born 11 November 1980) is an Indonesian former footballer.
