= Madura F.C. =

Indonesian football club

Madura
- Full name: Madura Football Club
- Nickname(s): Laskar Jokotole (Jokotole Warriors); Sapi Madura (The Madurese Bulls)
- Founded: 1964; 61 years ago (as Persebo Bondowoso); 2016; 9 years ago (as Persebo Musi Raya); 2017; 8 years ago (as Madura FC)
- Ground: Ahmad Yani Stadium
- Capacity: 15,000
- Owner: PT. Sepakbola Madura Bangkit
- Chairman: Salim
- Manager: Slamet Hidayat
- Coach: Vacant
- League: Liga 4
- 2021: Round of 16, (East Java zone)
| Home colours | Away colours |

Madura Football Club is an Indonesia football club based in Sumenep, East Java. After relegation, the club will compete in Liga 4 in 2024. Madura FC plays their home matches in the Ahmad Yani Stadium. Their nickname is Laskar Jokotole (Jokotole Warriors) and Sapi Madura (Madura Cows).

== History ==
Madura FC was founded as Persebo Bondowoso on 1964. They managed to get promoted to the Liga Indonesia Second Division in 2010 after beating PSIK Klaten 3–1. In 2012, they won promotion to the Liga Indonesia Premier Division. When their facing Indonesia Soccer Championship B in 2016, Persebo move their homebase - to the Serasan Sekate Stadium in the Musi Banyuasin, South Sumatra. Because Semeru Stadium less qualified. Consequently, by playing in Sumatra, Persebo too Groups 1 after previously placed in Group 2. Persebo exchanged with PS Bengkulu. Persebo change their name to Persebo Musi Raya after move to Musi Banyuasin. At the late March 2017, Persebo Musi Raya change their name to Madura FC after move their homebase to Sumenep, East Java.

== Stadium ==
Madura FC will use Ahmad Yani Stadium (groundshare with Perssu Sumenep) at Liga 2.

== Season-by-season records ==
| Season | League | Tier | Tms. | Pos. | Piala Indonesia |
|---|---|---|---|---|---|
| 2017 | Liga 2 | 2 | 61 | 3rd, Second round | – |
| 2018 | Liga 2 | 2 | 24 | 4th, Second round | Second round |
| 2019 | Liga 2 | 2 | 23 | 10th, East division | Second round |
| 2020 | Liga 3 | 3 | season abandoned | | – |
| 2021–22 | Liga 3 | 3 | 64 | Eliminated in Provincial round | – |
| 2022–23 | | | | | |
2023–24
2024–25
