= Endang Subrata =

Indonesian association footballer

Personal information
- Full name: Endang Egga Subrata
- Date of birth: 15 June 1992 (age 34)
- Place of birth: Bandung, Indonesia
- Height: 1.77 m (5 ft 10 in)
- Position: Goalkeeper

Team information
- Current team: Kalteng Putra
- Number: 15

Senior career*
Years	Team	Apps	(Gls)
2012–2014	Pelita Bandung Raya	0	(0)
2014–2015	Persipasi Bekasi	3	(0)
2016	Madiun Putra	9	(0)
2017	Lampung Sakti	9	(0)
2018	Persiwa Wamena	7	(0)
2019	PSIS Semarang	1	(0)
2020–2021	Mitra Kukar	0	(0)
2022–	Kalteng Putra	0	(0)
- * Club domestic league appearances and goals

Endang Egga Subrata (born 15 June 1992) is an Indonesian professional footballer who plays as a goalkeeper for Liga 2 club Kalteng Putra.

== Club career ==
=== Persiwa Wamena ===
In 2018, Endang Subrata signed a one-year contract with Indonesian Liga 2 club Persiwa Wamena.

=== PSIS Semarang ===
In 2019, Endang Subrata signed a one-year contract with Indonesian Liga 1 club PSIS Semarang. He made his debut on 4 December 2019 in a match against Persipura Jayapura at the Mandala Stadium, Jayapura.

=== Mitra Kukar ===
He was signed for Mitra Kukar to play in Liga 2 in the 2020 season. This season was suspended on 27 March 2020 due to the COVID-19 pandemic. The season was abandoned and was declared void on 20 January 2021.
