= Tebo =

Tebo may refer to:

== Places ==
- Tebo, a regency in Indonesia, whose seat is at the town of Muara Tebo
- Tebo Creek, a stream in Benton and Henry Counties in the U.S. state of Missouri
- Tebo Township, Henry County, Missouri, named after Tebo Creek
- Têbo, a populated place in Tibet
- Tèbo, a town in the Biro arrondissement in the Borgou Department, in Benin

== Persons ==
- Tebó, artist signature for art by Sacha Thébaud, a Caribbean-American Artist
- R.A.M Tebo II of Batibo, a fon (traditional chieftain), in Cameroon
- Casey Tebo (born 1974), American film producer and director
- Jared Tebo (born 1987), American radio-controlled racer

== Other ==
- tebo worm, another name of the butterworm, a moth

== See also ==
- Tebo Yacht Basin, acquired by Todd Shipyards
