= Persemag Magetan =

Indonesian football club

- Full name: Persatuan Sepakbola Magetan
- Nicknames: (Macan-Lawu) (Lawu-Tiger)
- Founded: 1977; 49 years ago as Asosiasi Sepakbola Magetan (ASMAG); 1989; 37 years ago as Persemag Magetan
- Ground: Yosonegoro Stadium; Magetan, East Java
- Capacity: 2,000
- Owner: Arif Mustofa
- Manager: Suryono
- Coach: Windu Widodo
- League: Liga 4
- 2023: Round of 28, (East Java zone)
Home colours	Away colours

Persatuan Sepakbola Magetan (simply known as Persemag Magetan) is an Indonesian football club based in Magetan Regency, East Java. They currently compete in the Liga 4.

== History ==
Persemag was founded in 1977 as Asosiasi Sepakbola Magetan (ASMAG). In 1989, ASMAG change its name to Persemag. Persemag best achievement was in 2000 when they managed to advance to Liga Indonesia First Division. But it didn't last long, Persemag falling down and now they are playing in the Liga 3 East Java Region.
