= Triton Stadium =

Football stadium in Kaimana, West Papua, Indonesia

- Location in West Papua
- Location: Kaimana, Kaimana Regency West Papua, Indonesia
- Coordinates: 3.66040°S 133.715117°E
- Owner: Regency government of Kaimana
- Operator: Regency government of Kaimana
- Capacity: 5,000
- Surface: Grass field

Tenants
- Perseka Kaimana; Kaimana Football Club

Triton Stadium is a football stadium in the town of Kaimana, Kaimana Regency, West Papua, Indonesia. The stadium has a capacity of 5,000 seats.

It is the home base of Perseka Kaimana and Kaimana Football Club.
