= Tèbo =

Coordinates: 09°50′10″N 02°50′19″E

- Arrondissement and town
- Interactive map of Tèbo
- Country: Benin
- Department: Borgou Department
- Commune: Nikki

Population (2013)
  - Total: 2,033
- Time zone: UTC+1 (WAT)

Tèbo is a town in the Biro arrondissement in the Borgou Department of Benin. It is an administrative division under the jurisdiction of the commune of Nikki. According to the population census in 2013, the village had a total population of 2,033.
