= Jember Sport Garden Stadium =

Stadium in East Java, Indonesia

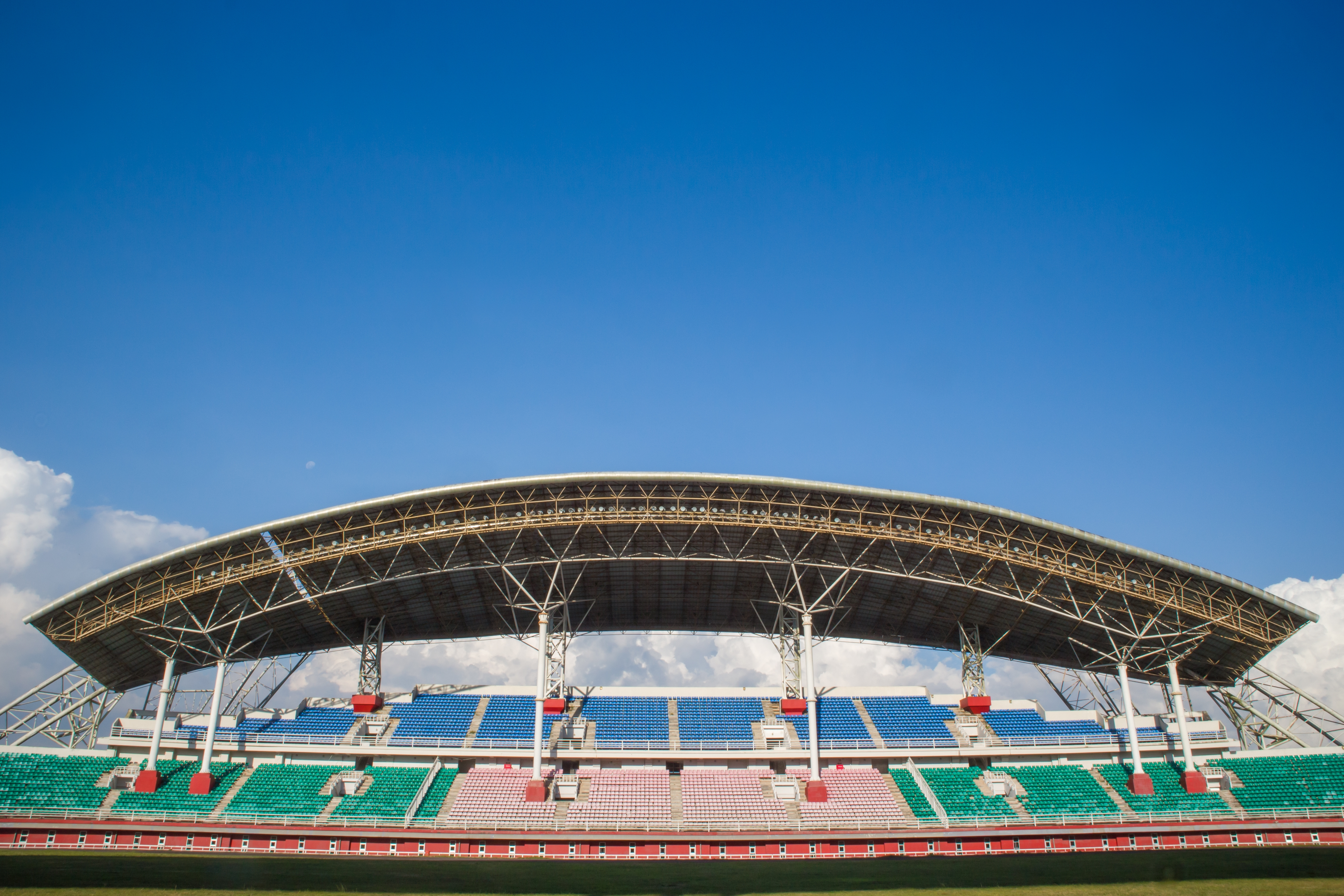

- Location in Java
- Location: Ajung, Jember Regency, East Java, Indonesia
- Coordinates: 8.213572°S 113.666549°E
- Owner: Government of Jember Regency
- Operator: Government of Jember Regency
- Capacity: 20,000

Construction
- Groundbreaking: October 2012
- Opened: 2015
- Cost: IDR 211 billion

Tenants
- Persid Jember; Semeru FC

Jember Sport Garden Stadium is a multi-purpose stadium in Ajung, Jember Regency, East Java, Indonesia. It is mostly used for football matches and is the new home stadium of Persid Jember.
