= Assyabaab Bangil =

Indonesian football club in East Java

- Full name: Assyabaab Bangil
- Nickname: Assyabaab Warriors
- Short name: AB
- Founded: 1920; 106 years ago
- Ground: Pogar Bangil Stadium; Pasuruan Regency, East Java
- Capacity: 10,000
- Owner: PSSI Pasuruan Regency
- CEO: Abu Bakar Assegaf
- Coach: Slamet
- League: Liga 4
- 2024–25: 3rd, in Group I (East Java zone)
Home colours	Away colours

Assyabaab Bangil is an Indonesian football club based in Pasuruan Regency, East Java. They are competing in Liga 4 and their homeground is Pogar Bangil Stadium.

== History ==
With a distinctive Arabic name, Assyabaab is indeed a club that was also founded by Arabs. But not by Arabs who are far from the Middle East, but people of Arab descent who live in Surabaya, Assyabaab was officially founded, with the name at that time was An-Nasher or literally means 'the victory'.

Initially founded by Yislam Murtak, Salim Barmen, Mohammad ibn Said Martak, and Mohammad Bahalmar. This club is only a sports association whose purpose is to show the existence of Arab descent, as well as a place for them to exercise. It is not surprising then that it is not only football, but also pencak silat and volleyball. In 1932, the club then joined NIVB (Nederlandsch Indische Voetbal Bond) or the football federation in the Dutch East Indies (currently Indonesia) so that they could participate in the internal competition of the Surabaya Football Federation, SVB (Soerabhaiasche Voetbal Bond).

On 16 June 1948, a major change occurred. Initiated by Zein ibn Agil, Aly Bahalwan, Mochtar, and Ali Salim, the name Al-Faouz was finally changed again, to Assyabaab which means 'youth'. A name that continues to this day, With an Arabic name, in 1964, there was a discourse to change the name to Putra Indonesia (lit. 'Son of Indonesia'). However, the discourse received opposition from a number of internal administrators, eventually ending after being mediated by the then Minister of Sports, Maladi. Which suggested that the name Assyabaab remain in use. As there were also several other clubs in Indonesia that had Arabic names at that time such as Al-Badar, Hizbul Wathan, and Al-Hilal.

Assyaabaab's achievements and contributions to the Indonesian football scene include the editions of 1–5 September 1975, 6 February 1976, and 31 October 1981. In addition to participating in Galatama and having won the 1990 Galatama Division 1, Assyabab has also participated in the 1991 Bentoel Cup, 1991 Tugu Muda Cup, 1993 Kasogi Cup, and 1993 Indocement Cup.

In 1997, when the economic crisis hit Indonesia, the club's main sponsor got into trouble and eventually Assyabaab Salim Group disbanded. As the strongest team in Surabaya, even though the group is gone, Assyabaab as an amateur team is still there. Mohammad Barmen is still listed as the coach.

In the 2009–10 season, Assyabaab was runner-up in the Persebaya Surabaya internal competition and was involved in a conflict with the Suryanaga Connection (Chinese descent club) who won. Since then the division of Persebaya's internal clubs has occurred and the problem has become complicated. The news about Assyabaab is slowly fading away. Now news about the club, sometimes still found in several newspapers based in Surabaya. Until after that, Assyabaab officially moved its headquarters to Bangil in Pasuruan Regency, which also has a fairly large population of Arab descent.
