= Perseka Kaimana =

Indonesian football club

Perseka
- Full name: Persatuan Sepakbola Kaimana
- Nicknames: The Golden Hawk; The Black and Gold
- Founded: 2003; 23 years ago
- Ground: Triton Stadium
- Capacity: 8,000
- Owner: PSSI Kaimana Regency
- Manager: Budi Nursalim Ohoimas
- Coach: Armand Mial
- League: Liga 4
- 2021–22: 4th in Group B, (Liga 3 West Papua zone)
Home colours	Away colours

Persatuan Sepakbola Kaimana (simply known as Perseka) is an Indonesian football club based in Kaimana Regency, West Papua. They currently compete in the Liga 4 West Papua zone.

== Season-by-season records ==
Season	League	Tier	Tms.	Pos.	Piala Indonesia
2012	First Division	3	56	1st	–
2013	Premier Division	2	39	3rd, Group 4	–
2014	Premier Division	2	63	7th, Group 8	–
2015					
2016
2017	Liga 2	2	61	4th, Relegation round	–
2018	Liga 3	3	32	Withdrew	–
2019					
2020
2021–22	Liga 3	3	64	Eliminated in provincial round	–
2022–23					
2023–24
2024–25

== Honours ==
- 2010–11: position 4th Division 2 (promotion to Division 1)
- 2011–12: Champion Division 1 (promotion to Premier Division)
