= Letjen Haji Sudirman Stadium =

- Location in Bojonegoro Regency
- Location: Bojonegoro Regency, Indonesia
- Coordinates: 7°08′53″S 111°54′03″E
- Owner: Persibo Bojonegoro
- Operator: Persibo Bojonegoro
- Capacity: 15,000 (Football)
- Surface: Grass

Tenant
- Persibo Bojonegoro

Letjen Haji Sudirman Stadium is a multi-use stadium in Bojonegoro, Indonesia. It is currently used mostly for football matches and is used as the home venue for Persibo Bojonegoro of the Liga Indonesia. The stadium has a capacity of 15,000 spectators.
