= Satria Stadium =

Sports stadium in Purwokerto, Indonesia

- Interactive map of Satria Stadium
- Location: Purwokerto, Banyumas Regency, Central Java, Indonesia
- Coordinates: 7°24′57.3″S 109°15′2.5″E
- Owner: Regency government of Banyumas
- Capacity: 5,000
- Surface: Grass field

Tenant
- Persibas Banyumas (1996–)

Satria Stadium is a sports stadium, used mostly for association football matches and also for athletics, located in Purwokerto, Central Java, Indonesia. The stadium is the home base of Persibas Banyumas.

== See also ==
- List of stadiums by capacity
