= R. Soedarsono Stadium =

Indonesian sports facility

Pogar Bangil Stadium R. Soedarsono Stadium
- Location in Java
- Address: Jl. Gajah Mada, Diwet, Pogar, Bangil, Pasuruan Regency, East Java 67153; Indonesia
- Location: Bangil, Pasuruan Regency, East Java
- Coordinates: 7.595123°S 112.774153°E
- Owner: Government of Pasuruan Regency
- Operator: Government of Pasuruan Regency
- Capacity: 10,000
- Surface: Grass field

Tenants
- Persekabpas Pasuruan; Assyabaab Bangil

Pogar Bangil Stadium or R. Soedarsono Stadium is a multi-use stadium in Bangil, Pasuruan Regency, East Java, Indonesia.

It is currently used mostly for football matches and is used as the home stadium for Persekabpas Pasuruan. The stadium has a capacity of 15,000 people.
