= Persekama Madiun =

Indonesian football club

- Full name: Persatuan Sepakbola Kabupaten Madiun
- Nickname(s): Laskar Pangeran Timoer
- Founded: 1997; 28 years ago
- Ground: Pangeran Timoer Stadium; Madiun Regency, East Java
- Capacity: 10,000
- Owner: Askab PSSI Madiun
- Manager: Muhammad Iskandar
- Coach: Sukamto
- League: Liga 4
- 2024–25: 3rd, in Group K (East Java zone)
Home colours	Away colours

(Persekama) is short for (Persatuan Sepakbola Kabupaten Madiun) (en: Football Association of Madiun Regency). Persekama Madiun is Indonesia football Team based in Madiun Regency, East Java. The team plays in Liga 4.
