= Diponegoro Stadium =

Indonesian Football Stadium

- Location in Banyuwangi Regency
- Address: Penganjuran, Banyuwangi, Banyuwangi Regency, East Java 68416
- Location: Banyuwangi, Banyuwangi Regency, East Java, Indonesia
- Coordinates: 8.215469°S 114.366523°E
- Owner: Government of Banyuwangi Regency
- Operator: Government of Banyuwangi Regency
- Capacity: 15,000
- Surface: Grass field

Construction
- Renovated: 2014

Tenant
- Persewangi Banyuwangi

Diponegoro Stadium is a football stadium in the town of Banyuwangi, Indonesia. The stadium has a capacity of 15,000 people.

It is the home base of Persewangi Banyuwangi.
