= Semeru Stadium =

Multi-purpose stadium in Lumajang, Indonesia

- Interactive map of Semeru Stadium
- Address: Lumajang Regency; Indonesia
- Location: Lumajang Regency, Indonesia
- Coordinates: 8°07′02″S 113°13′42″E
- Owner: Government of Lumajang Regency
- Operator: Government of Lumajang Regency
- Capacity: 15,000
- Surface: Grass field

Construction
- Renovated: 2008, 2022

Tenants
- Semeru FC; PSIL Lumajang

Semeru Stadium is a multi-purpose stadium in the town of Lumajang, Indonesia. It is currently used mostly for football matches. The stadium has a capacity of 15,000 people After being renovated for the Pekan Olahraha Provinsi/ PORPROV VII (Provincial Sports Week), Semeru Stadium has National Standard . Semeru stadium was formerly named Karya Jaya Stadium. In addition, the stadium is a stadium Lumajang community pride.

It is the home base of Semeru FC and PSIL Lumajang.

== History ==
Pride of Lumajang stadium, previously being named SEMERU STADIUM DISTRICT OF LUMAJANG, the stadium was named Karya Jaya Lumajang Stadium

On the front page this stadium, there are also several sports fields. Among other things, tennis courts, basketball courts, volleyball and soccer field. Every afternoon, many people exercise this stadium page.

In the past, the main door stadium facing east to Jl.Jend.A.Yani. But now, after the stadium was renovated, and Judah change the name, the stadium eventually changed facing westward, to Jl.Gajah MADA. Yag Jl.Jend.A.Yani while facing the back entrance or exit from the stadium.

== Location ==
Gajah Mada Street, Kepuharjo, Lumajang districts, Lumajang Regency, East Java 6731 - 0812-3456-569

== Stadium Condition ==
Part	Score
Stand	B
Seat	B+
Facilities	B+
Surface	A
Drainase	B
Score Board	A
Condition	B
