= Wilis Stadium =

Multi-purpose stadium in Madiun, Indonesia

- Interactive map of Wilis Stadium
- Address: Jl. Mastrip, Klegen, Kartoharjo, 63117; Indonesia
- Location: Madiun, East Java
- Coordinates: 7°37′51.6″S 111°31′46.8″E
- Owner: Government of Madiun City
- Operator: Government of Madiun City
- Capacity: 25,000

Tenants
- PSM Madiun; Madiun Putra; Indonesia Muda

Wilis Stadium is a multi-purpose stadium in Madiun, Indonesia. It is currently used mostly for football matches. This stadium holds 25,000 spectators.

== See also ==
- List of stadiums in Indonesia
