= Madiun Putra F.C. =

Indonesian football club

Madiun Putra FC
- Full name: Madiun Putra Football Club
- Nickname(s): (Kancil Biru); The Blue Force
- Short name: MPFC
- Founded: 1986; 39 years ago
- Ground: Wilis Stadium; Madiun; East Java
- Capacity: 25,000
- Owner: Ambassador Development
- Chairman: Unggul Akbar Musttaqien
- Manager: Duta Radia
- Coach: Roni Tri Prasnanto
- League: Liga 4
- 2023: Round of 28,(East Java Round)
| Home colours | Away colours |

Madiun Putra Football Club is an Indonesian football Team based in Madiun, East Java. They currently compete in the Liga 4 East Java.

== Players ==
Note: Flags indicate national team as defined under FIFA eligibility rules; some limited exceptions apply. Players may hold more than one non-FIFA nationality.

| No. | Pos. | Nation | Player |
|---|---|---|---|
| 1 | GK | IDN | Achmad Syaiful Amri |
| 3 | MF | IDN | Moch Sholehudin |
| 4 | DF | IDN | Slamet Hermoko |
| 6 | DF | IDN | Nova Setiantoro |
| 7 | MF | IDN | Purniawan |
| 8 | FW | IDN | Wendyk Setyo Nugroho |
| 9 | FW | IDN | Nanang Wahyudi |
| 11 | FW | IDN | Marwansyah Agung |
| 12 | GK | IDN | Endang Subrata |
| 17 | MF | IDN | Arfan Ary Wijaya |
| 18 | MF | IDN | Lutfi Ardiansyah Pratama |

| No. | Pos. | Nation | Player |
|---|---|---|---|
| 19 | MF | IDN | Yulian Eka Hermawan |
| 22 | DF | IDN | Randi Hardianto |
| 25 | FW | IDN | Agus Yulianto |
| 36 | GK | IDN | Agung Hari Mukti |
| 44 | MF | IDN | Mahardika Fajar Ramadhan |
| 77 | DF | IDN | Fadli Fernanda |
| 79 | DF | IDN | Ambitie Dolus |
| 82 | GK | IDN | Puguh Sunaryo |
| 87 | FW | IDN | Errol Simunapendi |
| 88 | MF | IDN | Asmar Abu |
| 98 | MF | IDN | Agus Riawan |

== Season-by-season records ==
| Season | League | Tier | Tms. | Pos. | Piala Indonesia |
|---|---|---|---|---|---|
| 2009–10 | Second Division | 4 | | Promoted | – |
| 2010 | First Division | 3 | 57 | 2nd, Third round | – |
| 2011–12 | Premier Division (LPIS) | 2 | 28 | 6th, Group 3 | – |
| 2013 | Premier Division | 2 | 39 | 6th, Group 5 | – |
| 2014 | Premier Division | 2 | 63 | 5th, Group 5 | – |
| 2015 | Premier Division | 2 | 55 | did not finish | – |
| 2016 | Indonesia Soccer Championship B | 2 | 53 | 3rd, Group 5 | – |
| 2017 | Liga 2 | 2 | 61 | 7th, Group 5 | – |
| 2018 | Liga 3 | 3 | 32 | Eliminated in National zone route | – |
| 2019 | | | | | |
2020
2021–22
2022–23
| 2023–24 | Liga 3 | 3 | 80 | Eliminated in Provincial round | – |
| 2024–25 | | | | | |
