= Ketonggo Stadium =

Stadium in Ngawi, Indonesia

Coordinates: 7°25′07″S 111°26′33″E

- Interactive map of Ketonggo Stadium
- Location: Ngawi city, Ngawi, Indonesia
- Owner: Government of Ngawi Regency
- Operator: Government of Ngawi Regency
- Capacity: 10,000
- Surface: Grass

Tenant
- Persinga Ngawi

Ketonggo Stadium is a football stadium in the town of Ngawi, Indonesia. The stadium has a capacity of 10,000 people. It is the home ground of Persinga Ngawi.
