= Ahmad Yani Stadium =

Stadium in Sumenep, East Java

- SAY
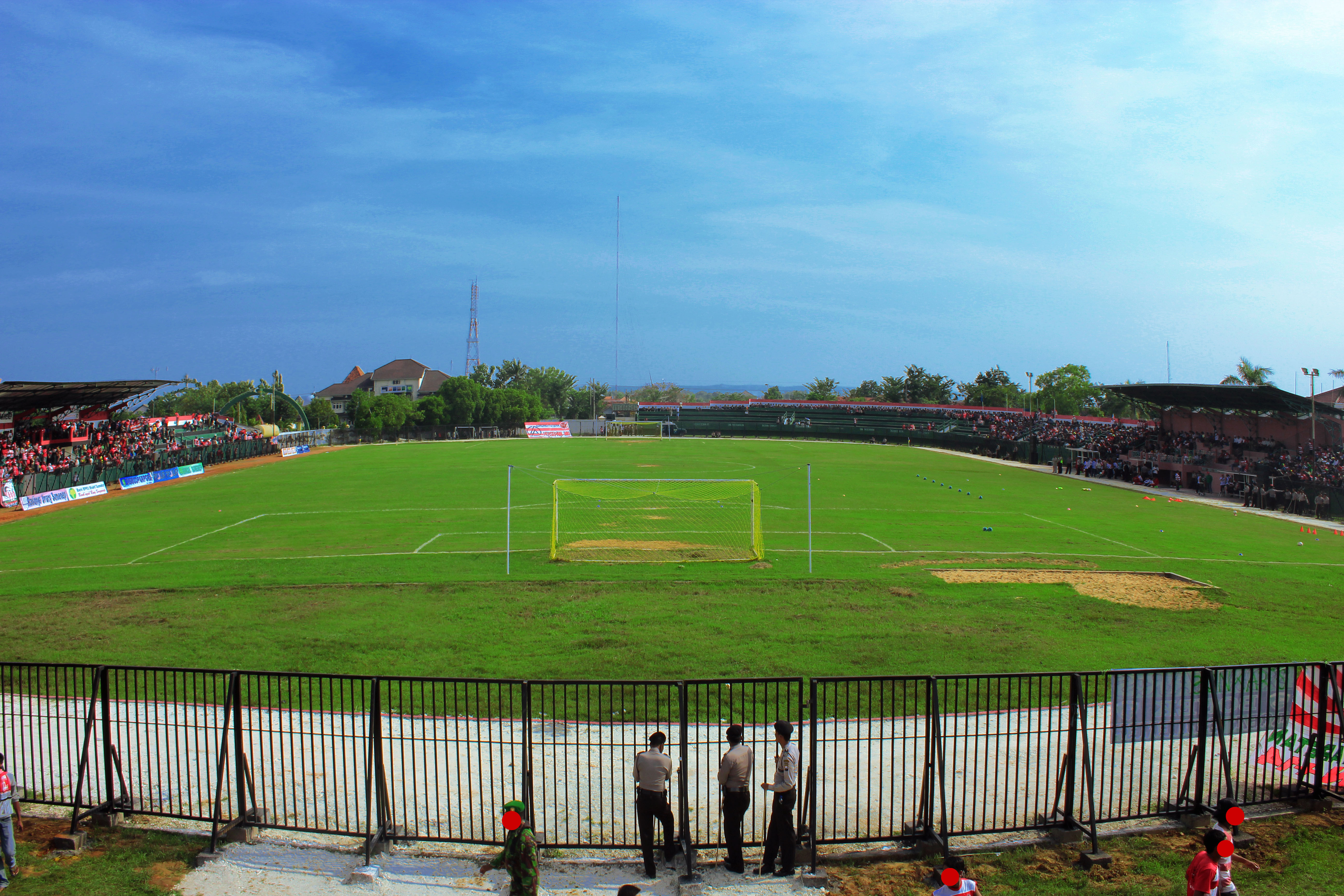
- Ahmad Yani Stadium

- Location in Java
- Location: Sumenep, East Java, Indonesia
- Coordinates: 7°1′00.2″S 113°52′27.0″E
- Owner: Government of Sumenep Regency
- Operator: Government of Sumenep Regency
- Capacity: 15,000
- Surface: Grass field

Construction
- Built: 1990
- Opened: 1990

Tenants
- Madura F.C. and Perssu Sumenep

Ahmad Yani Stadium is the name of a football stadium in the city of Sumenep, East Java, Indonesia. It was named after National Hero of Indonesia, General Ahmad Yani. It is used as the home venue for Madura F.C. and Perssu Sumenep of the Liga Indonesia. The stadium has a capacity of 15,000. The stadium was built in 1990.
