= PSBK-PETA =

Indonesian football club

- Full name: Persatuan Sepakbola Blitar Kota-Pembela Tanah Air
- Nickname(s): Laskar PETA (PETA Warriors); Macan Lodro (Lodro Tiger)
- Founded: 14 February 2006; 19 years ago
- Ground: Gelora Supriyadi Stadium; Blitar, East Java, Indonesia
- Capacity: 15,000
- Owner: Askot PSSI Blitar
- Chairman: Yudi Meira
- Coach: Joni Hermanto
- League: Liga 4
- 2024–25: 4th, in Group H (East Java zone)
Home colours	Away colours

Persatuan Sepakbola Blitar Kota-Pembela Tanah Air, commonly known as PSBK-PETA or just PSBK, is an Indonesian football club based in Blitar, East Java. They play in Liga 4. Their nicknames are Laskar PETA and Macan Lodro. They play their home match in Gelora Supriyadi Stadium. which is located in downtown Blitar.

== Season-by-season records ==
Season	League	Tier	Tms.	Pos.	Piala Indonesia
2007	Third Division	4		2	–
2008–09	Second Division	4		Promoted	–
2009–10	First Division	3	60	3rd, Second round	–
2010	First Division	3	57	3rd, Third round	–
2011–12	Premier Division	2	22	3rd, Second round	–
2013	Premier Division	2	39	5th, Group 3	–
2014	Premier Division	2	63	6th, Group 5	–
2015	Premier Division	2	55	did not finish	–
2016	ISC B	2	53	5th, Group 6	–
2017	Liga 2	2	61	3rd, Relegation round	–
2018	Liga 3	3	32	Second round	First round
2019	Liga 3	3	32	Eliminated in Pre-national route	First round
2020					
2021–22
2022–23
2023–24	Liga 3	3	80	Eliminated in Provincial round	–
2024–25	Liga 4	64	4	Eliminated in Provincial round	–
