= PSM Madiun =

Indonesian football club

- Full name: Persatuan Sepakbola Madiun
- Nicknames: Banteng Wilis (The Wilis Bulls)
- Founded: 29 May 1929; 97 years ago (as Madioensche Voetbal Bond)
- Ground: Wilis Stadium
- Capacity: 25.000
- Chairman: Nono Djatikusumo
- Manager: Nono Djatikusumo
- Coach: Edy Santoso
- League: Liga 4
- 2024–25: Liga Nusantara, 4th in Group K Relegation Round, (Relegation)
Home colours	Away colours

Persatuan Sepakbola Madiun (commonly known as PSM Madiun) is an Indonesian football club based in Madiun, East Java. They currently plays in Liga 4 and their homebase is Wilis Stadium.

== History ==
The club was founded in 1929 under as Madioensche Voetbal Bond (MVB). On 19 April 1930, MVB and seven other clubs established the Persatoean Sepak Raga Seloeroeh Indonesia (Football Association of Indonesia).

On 6 February 2025, PSM Madiun was relegated to Liga 4 after 5-0 defeat against Perserang Serang.

== Players ==
=== Current squad ===
As of September 2026

Note: Flags indicate national team as defined under FIFA eligibility rules; some limited exceptions apply. Players may hold more than one non-FIFA nationality.

No.	Pos.	Nation	Player
4	DF	IDN	Agus Prasetyo
6	MF	IDN	Achmad Muchtarom
7	FW	IDN	Rian Hidayat
8	DF	IDN	Jawahiril Arzaq
9	FW	IDN	Alfian Faozi
10	MF	IDN	Obet Yulius (captain)
18	MF	IDN	Rizki Ramadan
19	MF	IDN	Ridwan Prihandoko
20	GK	IDN	Izzul Khaq
21	FW	IDN	Aldi Setya Wicaksono

No.	Pos.	Nation	Player
22	FW	IDN	Taufikur Rahman
23	MF	IDN	Eka Putra Yudhistira
24	DF	IDN	Moch Idris
25	FW	IDN	Ahnaf Desem Reno
26	DF	IDN	Achmad Bachtiar
27	MF	IDN	Abi Septiandi Zidandio
28	DF	IDN	Rendi Tiyeri
29	FW	IDN	Rendika Adi Pratama
30	GK	IDN	Davano Alzamora

== Season-by-season records ==
Season(s)	League/Division	Tier	Tms.	Pos.	Piala Indonesia	AFC/AFF competition(s)	
2004	Second Division	3		Eliminated in Provincial round	–	–	–
2005	Third Division	4		Eliminated in Provincial round	–	–	–
2006	Third Division	4		Eliminated in Provincial round	–	–	–
2007	Third Division	4		Eliminated in Provincial round	–	–	–
2008–09							
2009–10
2010–11
2011–12
2013
2014
2015
2016
2017
2018
2019	Liga 3	3	32	Eliminated in Provincial round	–	–	–
2020	Liga 3	3	season abandoned		–	–	–
2021–22							
2022–23	Liga 3	3	season abandoned		–	–	–
2023–24	Liga 3	3	80	4th, Third round	–	–	–
2024–25	Liga Nusantara	3	16	4th, Relegation round	–	–	

== Coaching staff ==
As of 15 December 2024

Position	Staff
Head coach	(Indonesia) Edy Santoso
Assistant coach	(Indonesia) Kodari Amir
Assistant coach	(Indonesia) Rony Firmansyah
Goalkeeper coach	(Indonesia) Saifudin
Physical Coach	(Indonesia) Miftakul Huda

== Stadium ==
The club's home base is Wilis Stadium (groundshared with Madiun Putra) located at Jalan Mastrip, Klegen, Kartoharjo, Madiun 63117 with a capacity of 25,000 spectators.
