= Perssu Madura City =

Indonesian football club

- Full name: Persatuan Sepakbola Sumenep
- Nickname: Kuda Terbang Sumekar
- Founded: 1977; 49 years ago
- Ground: Ahmad Yani Stadium; Sumenep Regency, East Java
- Capacity: 15,000
- Owner: Perssu Foundation Club Ltd.
- Manager: Hairul Anwar
- Coach: Budiardjo Thalib
- League: Liga 4
- 2024–25: Round of 32, (East Java zone)
| Home colours | Away colours |

Persatuan Sepakbola Sumenep (also known as Perssu Madura City) is an Indonesian football club based in Sumenep Regency, East Java. It currently compete in Liga 4 East Java zone.

== History ==
Established on 1977, the club began its tenure in the Indonesian football league by playing in the Liga Indonesia Third Division. In the 2011-12 season, Perssu, which at that time was ranked 11th in Third Division, were entitled to promotion to Liga Indonesia Second Division. In its inaugural season in Second Division, the club finished in 6th place. After a change in format, Perssu played in 2014 Liga Nusantara.

In December 2014, the club was promoted to the Liga Indonesia Premier Division.

In 2016 Indonesia Soccer Championship B, Perssu achieved a third-place finish under PSCS Cilacap and PSS Sleman. Perssu Sumenep managed to beat Martapura through the penalty shootout.

However, in the 2017 Liga 2, Perssu was ranked 6th in Group 6, and was relegated to Liga 3 along with 39 other clubs.

== Players ==
=== Current squad ===
As of 12 December 2023

Note: Flags indicate national team as defined under FIFA eligibility rules; some limited exceptions apply. Players may hold more than one non-FIFA nationality.

| No. | Pos. | Nation | Player |
|---|---|---|---|
| 1 | GK | IDN | Guruh Guwino |
| 2 | DF | IDN | Imam Burhanuddin |
| 3 | DF | IDN | Yafisham Yaqlul Pasya |
| 4 | DF | IDN | Emerson Daffajr Setiana |
| 5 | DF | IDN | Moch Luthfi Sabilillah |
| 6 | DF | IDN | Rivaldo Sihombing |
| 8 | DF | IDN | Hairul |
| 9 | FW | IDN | Wimba Sutan Fanosa |
| 10 | FW | IDN | Sandrian |
| 12 | DF | IDN | Arif Rosidi |
| 13 | MF | IDN | Agung Dwi Yulianto |
| 14 | DF | IDN | Rivaldo Dwi Sugandi |
| 15 | GK | IDN | Rifqy Bachtiar |
| 17 | MF | IDN | Muhammad Hifni |

| No. | Pos. | Nation | Player |
|---|---|---|---|
| 19 | MF | IDN | Komang Rama Ardika Putra |
| 22 | GK | IDN | M. Abrori |
| 25 | MF | IDN | Achmad Saugi |
| 27 | MF | IDN | Ahmad Dedi |
| 28 | FW | IDN | Bagas Prasetyo Wicaksono |
| 29 | MF | IDN | Richard Arberd Anderson |
| 30 | MF | IDN | M. Jatimul Hidayat |
| 33 | GK | IDN | Yusuf Bhaktiar |
| 34 | FW | IDN | Aan |
| 45 | MF | IDN | Aan Dwi Saputra |
| 50 | FW | IDN | Gunawan |
| 81 | FW | IDN | Erik Gamis Sanjaya |
| 90 | FW | IDN | Aditya Futzal Ramadhan |

== Supporters ==
The Peccot Mania was established on 23 February 2011, as a supporter group for Perssu Sumenep and Madura United. They are part of the Supporter Madura Bersatu (SMB), in there are also other groups of supporters such as Tretan Dhibik (Pamekasan), Trunojoyo Mania (Sampang), and K-Conk Mania (Bangkalan).

== Season-by-season records ==
| Season | League | Tier | Tms. | Pos. | Piala Indonesia |
|---|---|---|---|---|---|
| 2013 | Second Division | 4 | 73 | 4th, Second round | – |
| 2014 | Liga Nusantara | 4 | | 3 | – |
| 2015 | Premier Division | 2 | 55 | did not finish | – |
| 2016 | ISC B | 2 | 53 | 3 | – |
| 2017 | Liga 2 | 2 | 61 | 6th, Group 6 | – |
| 2018 | Liga 3 | 3 | 32 | Second round | Second round |
| 2019 | Liga 3 | 3 | 32 | Eliminated in Pre-national route | Second round |
| 2020 | Liga 3 | 3 | season abandoned | | – |
| 2021–22 | Liga 3 | 3 | 64 | Eliminated in Provincial round | – |
| 2022–23 | Liga 3 | 3 | season abandoned | | – |
| 2023–24 | Liga 3 | 3 | 80 | Eliminated in Provincial round | – |
| 2024–25 | Liga 4 | 4 | 64 | Eliminated in Provincial round | – |

== Honours ==
- Liga Nusantara
  - Third-place (1): 2014
- Indonesia Soccer Championship B
  - Third-place (1): 2016
