= Hizbul Wathan F.C. =

Association football team in Indonesia

Hizbul Wathan
- Full name: Hizbul Wathan Football Club
- Nickname(s): Sun Warriors; The Sun Turtles
- Short name: HWFC; PSHW Sidoarjo
- Founded: 1970; 55 years ago, as Persigo Gorontalo; 2017; 8 years ago, as Semeru FC; 25 February 2020; 5 years ago, as Hizbul Wathan FC
- Ground: Gelora Delta Stadium; Sidoarjo
- Capacity: 19,400
- Owner: Muhammadiyah East Java Region Leadership
- Chairman: Dhimam Abror
- Coach: Freddy Muli
- League: Liga 4
- 2024–25: 4th, in Group O (East Java zone)
- Website: https://hizbulwathanfc.id/
Home colours	Away colours	Third colours

Hizbul Wathan Football Club is a professional Indonesian football team based in Sidoarjo Regency, East Java. They compete in the fourth tier of Indonesian league, Liga 4.

== History ==
Semeru FC is an amalgamation of other Lumajang regional teams. In 2017, hoping to promote regional football and build community pride, regent ASAT Malik met with local football clubs including Persigo Gorontalo, based in Gorontalo to discuss a merger. The owner of Persigo Gorontalo, Ngateman, and ASAT Malik finalized a merger agreement and renamed Persigo Gorontalo to Semeru FC.

In forming Semeru FC, local Lumajang footballers hope to raise the standard of their play and break into national football. As of 2017 the team was in the Liga Nusantara level.

On 25 February 2020, the East Java Regional Leadership of Muhammadiyah (East Java PWM) confirmed that it has acquired Semeru FC, one of the participating Liga 2 football clubs. They acquired Semeru FC who this season competed in Liga 2. In addition, they will compete under the name PS Hizbul Wathan (named after its scouting wing) and headquartered at the Gelora Delta Stadium. Chairman of the East Java PWM M. Saad Ibrahim said that the acquisition was carried out because Muhammadiyah wanted to "preach through football". Despite being a new territory, the organization wanted to instill the values of Islam, nationality and humanity through football; citing its cadres like Soeratin Sosrosoegondo that used to be the founders of the Football Association of Indonesia (PSSI).

== Name and logo change ==
Semeru FC Lumajang (2017–2019)

== Coaching staff ==
Position	Name
Head Coach	(Indonesia) Freddy Muli
Assistant Coach	(Indonesia) Yusman Mulyono
Fitness Coach	(Indonesia) Kodari Amir
Goalkeeper Coach	(Indonesia) Muhammad Adam

== Stadium ==
Hizbul Wathan Football Club Sidoarjo plays their home matches at Gelora Delta Stadium in 2020.

== Season-by-season records ==
Season	League	Tier	Tms.	Pos.	Piala Indonesia
2020	Liga 2	2	24	did not finish	–
2021–22	Liga 2	2	24	6th, Group C	–
2022–23	Liga 3	3	season abandoned		–
2023–24					
2024–25	Liga 4	4	64	Eliminated in Provincial round	–
