= Persewangi Banyuwangi =

Indonesian football club

Persewangi
- Full name: Persatuan Sepakbola Banyuwangi
- Nicknames: Laskar Blambangan; Laros Jenggirat
- Founded: 1 December 1970; 55 years ago
- Ground: Diponegoro Stadium; Banyuwangi (town), East Java
- Capacity: 15,000
- President: Handoko
- Coach: Purwanto Suwondo
- League: Liga 4
- 2024–25: 1st (East Java zone); Third round, 4th in Group B (National phase)
Home colours	Away colours

Persatuan Sepakbola Banyuwangi (simply known as Persewangi) is an Indonesian football club based in Diponegoro Stadium, Banyuwangi Regency, East Java. They currently compete in the Liga 4 East Java zone.

== Honours ==
- Liga Indonesia Second Division
  - Runners-up (3): 1996–97, 2007, 2009–10
- Liga 4 East Java
  - Champion (1): 2024–25

== Players ==
=== Current squad ===
As of 5 January 2025

Note: Flags indicate national team as defined under FIFA eligibility rules; some limited exceptions apply. Players may hold more than one non-FIFA nationality.

No.	Pos.	Nation	Player
—	GK	IDN	Dimas Faiz
—	GK	IDN	Ilham Abdurrohman
—	GK	IDN	Firdaus Jufri
—	GK	IDN	Zaki Ali Sapari
—	DF	IDN	Anis Mujiono
—	DF	IDN	Andika Dwi Putra
—	DF	IDN	Arya Ramadhan
—	DF	IDN	Deni Wahyu
—	DF	IDN	Khalifatur Risky
—	DF	IDN	Rachmat Latief
—	DF	IDN	Teddy Galih Saputra
—	DF	IDN	Sandi Maulana Putra
—	MF	IDN	Yusuf Effendi

No.	Pos.	Nation	Player
—	MF	IDN	Fadel Muhammad
—	MF	IDN	Ramdin Tuasalamony
—	MF	IDN	Akbar Syakira
—	MF	IDN	Fitrah Ramadhan
—	MF	IDN	Dheo Zendy
—	MF	IDN	Yohanes Mali Dasi
—	FW	IDN	Wahyu Lutfi Bahtiar
—	FW	IDN	Maldini Pali
—	FW	IDN	Alfian Arfarid
—	FW	IDN	Ilham Maulana
—	FW	IDN	Muhammad Yusran
—	FW	IDN	Muhammad Rizal
—	FW	IDN	Ahmad Duwaidar
