= 2014 PSIS Semarang season =

PSIS Semarang
2014 season
- Chairman: (Indonesia) Yoyok Sukawi
- Manager: (Indonesia) Eko Riyadi
- Liga Indonesia Premier Division: quarter-final
- Top goalscorer: (Indonesia) Hari Nur Yulianto (17)

PSIS Semarang with two foreign footballers Julio Alcorsé and Ronald Fagundez started the 2014 Liga Indonesia Premier Division superbly, topping the standings of Group 4, with only 1 defeat, to qualify for the a quarter-finals. PSIS Semarang's striker Hari Nur Yulianto became the 4th top scorer with 14 goals under Abblode Yao Rudy (Persiwa Wamena, 17 goals), Brima Pepito Sanusie (Martapura FC, 16 goals), and Fernando Gaston Soler (Pusamania Borneo F.C., 15 goals), while Mahesa Jenar's other striker Julio Alcorsé was ranked 7th with 13 goals.

Match Fixed Scandal (Sepak Bola Gajah Scandal) The hard-won effort built since the start of the season had to end in the final game which only fight over to the group winner position. PSS Sleman and PSIS Semarang are involved in a scandal in which the two clubs were both desperate to avoid facing Pusamania Borneo F.C. Management argued "because it avoids Indonesian football mafia, they assess Pusamania Borneo F.C. is set to win the 2014 Liga Indonesia Premier Division so we avoid it". As a result of this scandal, Laskar Mahesa Djenar was disqualified from the semi-finals round. While coach Eko Riyadi, Saptono, Fadly Manna and Catur Adi Nugraha get life sentence not to play in Indonesian football and fine each 100 million Rupiah.

== Squad ==
Update November 2014

No.	Nama	Negara	Posisi	Tanggal Lahir (Usia)	Klub Sebelumnya
Goalkeepers
1	Ivo Andre Wibowo	(Indonesia)	GK	August 28, 1989 (aged 24)	PS Siak
20	Catur Adi Nugraha	(Indonesia)	GK	January 20, 1985 (aged 28)	Persewangi Banyuwangi
25	Fajar Setya Jaya	(Indonesia)	GK	November 17, 1995 (aged 18)	PSIS Magang
Defenders
2	Yudha Pramana	(Indonesia)	CB/RB	November 17, 1995 (aged 18)	Berlian Rajawali
5	Welly Siagian	(Indonesia)	CB/LB	May 18, 1992 (aged 21)	PSCS Cilacap
13	Fauzan Fajri	(Indonesia)	CB	May 18, 1989 (aged 24)	Persap Purbalingga
26	Taufik Hidayat	(Indonesia)	RB/LB	March 20, 1993 (aged 20)	PS Beltim
27	Safrudin Tahar	(Indonesia)	CB	December 13, 1993 (aged 20)	PSM Makassar
29	Sunar Sulaiman	(Indonesia)	CB	December 29, 1983 (aged 30)	Arema Malang
42	Anam Syahrul Fitrianto	(Indonesia)	RB/LB	August 30, 1985 (aged 28)	Persijap Jepara
Midfielders
7	Muhamad Yunus	(Indonesia)	CM	July 7, 1988 (aged 25)	Persitema
8	Vidi Hasiholan	(Indonesia)	CM/AM	January 2, 1989 (aged 24)	PBR FC U-21
12	Andik Rahmat	(Indonesia)	AM	October 25, 1994 (aged 19)	PSIS Magang
15	Ediyanto	(Indonesia)	CM	February 2, 1986 (aged 27)	Persewon Wondama
17	Franky Mahendra	(Indonesia)	LM/RM	June 6, 1991 (aged 22)	Persipur
19	Khomaidi	(Indonesia)	CM	December 10, 1990 (aged 23)	PSIS Magang
23	Eli Nasokha	(Indonesia)	AM	June 18, 1992 (aged 21)	PSS Sleman
24	Fadly Manna	(Indonesia)	AM	January 11, 1991 (aged 22)	PSM Makassar
28	Ronald Fagundez(c)	(Uruguay)	RM/LM	May 12, 1979 (aged 34)	Putra Samarinda
Forwards
4	Elmirio Andrestani	(Indonesia)	FW/CF	December 5, 1993 (aged 20)	Berlian Rajawali FC
10	Julio Alcorsé	(Argentina)	CF	September 17, 1981 (aged 32)	Persijap Jepara
11	Saptono	(Indonesia)	FW	April 16, 1989 (aged 24)	Persibangga
14	Ahmad Noviandani	(Indonesia)	FW	July 6, 1995 (aged 18)	Persijap Jepara
22	Hari Nur Yulianto	(Indonesia)	CF	July 31, 1989 (aged 24)	PSCS Cilacap

== Top scorers ==
- (Argentina) Julio Alcorsé 13 Gol
- (Indonesia) Muhamad Yunus 7 Gol
- (Uruguay) Ronald Fagundez 7 Gol
- (Indonesia) Fauzan Fajri 6 Gol
- (Indonesia) Ahmad Noviandani 5 Gol

== First stage ==
Pos	Team	Pld	W	D	L	GF	GA	GD	Pts	Qualification or relegation	SOL	SMG	REM	PPUR	PSIP	PPSM	PSKU	TEMA
1	Persis	14	8	5	1	20	9	+11	29	Advances to Second round		1–0	3–0	1–0	1–0	2–2	3–1	2–0
2	PSIS	14	9	2	3	29	12	+17	29	Advances to Second round	1–1		1–0	3–1	3–0	4–0	3–2	4–0
3	PSIR	14	6	3	5	18	13	+5	21		1–1	2–0		2–1	3–1	3–0	2–0	3–0
4	Persipur Purwodadi	14	5	3	6	19	18	+1	18		0–1	3–2	2–1		3–0	4–1	0–0	2–0
5	Persip Pekalongan	14	5	2	7	16	21	−5	17		0–0	0–2	2–0	3–0		1–0	1–1	3–0
6	PPSM Sakti Magelang	14	5	2	7	21	30	−9	17		2–1	1–3	2–1	2–1	5–1		3–3	3–2
7	Persiku Kudus (R)	14	3	7	4	16	18	−2	16	Relegation to 2015 Liga Nusantara	2–2	1–1	0–0	0–0	2–1	2–0		2–0
8	Persitema Temanggung (R)	14	2	2	10	9	27	−18	8	Relegation to 2015 Liga Nusantara	0–1	0–2	0–0	2–2	1–3	2–0	2–0	

Updated to match(es) played on 23 August 2014. Source: 2014 Premier Division table and 2014 Premier Division results
Rules for classification: 1) points; 2) goal difference; 3) number of goals scored.
(R) Relegated

=== Match results ===
15 April 2014 1	PSIS Semarang	3-1	Persipur Purwodadi	Jatidiri Stadium
	Alcorsé 45' Pen; Hari Nur Yulianto 48'; Taufik 48'		Nur Hamid 10'

18 April 2014 2	PSIS Semarang	1-0	PSIR Rembang	Jatidiri Stadium
	Alcorsé 35'

22 April 2014 3	Persip Pekalongan	0-2	PSIS Semarang	Kota Batik Stadium
			Alcorsé 42'; Alcorsé 47'

26 April 2014 4	PPSM	1-3	PSIS Semarang	Stadion Madya Magelang
	Ardiansyah 58'		M. Yunus 33'; Safrudin Tahar 47'; Hari Nur Yulianto 75'

3 May 2014 5	PSIS Semarang	4-0	Persitema Temanggung	Jatidiri Stadium
	Alcorsé 33'; Fauzan 37'; Fauzan 42'; Boas Atururi 53'

10 May 2014 6	PSIS Semarang	3-2	Persiku Kudus	Jatidiri Stadium
	M. Yunus 32'; Fauzan Fajri 84'; Fauzan Fajri 90+1'		Amadou Gakou 35'; Agus Ryanto 74'

14 May 2014 7	Persis Solo	1-0	PSIS Semarang	Manahan Stadium
	Yanuar 55'

31 May 2014 8	PSIS Semarang	1-1	Persis Solo	Jatidiri Stadium
	Ahmad Noviandani 6'		Nnana Onana 38'

4 June 2014 9	Persiku Kudus	1-1	PSIS Semarang	Wergu Wetan Stadium
	Alcorsé 10'		Amadou Gakou 38'

11 June 2014 10	Persitema Temanggung	0-2	PSIS Semarang	Bhumi Phala Stadium
			Fauzan 54'; Alcorsé 70'

11 August 2014 11	PSIS Semarang	4-0	PPSM Sakti Magelang	Jatidiri Stadium
			Ronald Fagundez 6'; M. Yunus 14'; Alcorsé 36'; Hari Nur 89'

19 August 2014 12	PSIR Rembang	2-0	PSIS Semarang	Rembang Krida Stadium
	Zaenal Arifin 16'; Christian Lenglolo 58'

15 August 2014 13	PSIS Semarang	3-0	Persip Pekalongan	Jatidiri Stadium
	Ronald Fagundez 12'pen Ahmad Noviandani 70'; Hari Nur 90'

23 August 2014 14	Persipur Purwodadi	3-2	PSIS Semarang	Krida Bakti Stadium
	Jhon Tamba 46'; Anenoue Biemvenu 57'; Heri Widiyanto 60'		Hari Nur 25'; Franky Mahendra 81'

== 2nd Stage (Group J) ==
Pos	Team	Pld	W	D	L	GF	GA	GD	Pts	Qualification	SMG	PSCS	PDFC	KABO
1	PSIS	6	4	1	1	12	6	+6	13	Advances to Third round		1–0	2–1	5–1
2	PSCS Cilacap	6	3	1	2	8	6	+2	10	Advances to Third round	3–1		1–0	2–0
3	Pro Duta	6	2	1	3	8	8	0	7		1–1	3–1		3–2
4	Persikabo Bogor	6	1	1	4	5	13	−8	4		0–2	1–1	1–0	

Updated to match(es) played on 24 September 2014. Source: 2014 Premier Division table and 2014 Premier Division results
Rules for classification: 1) points; 2) goal difference; 3) number of goals scored.

=== Match results ===
2 September 2014 1	Persikabo	0-2	PSIS Semarang	Persikabo Stadium
			Fauzan 5' Pen; Hari Nur Yulianto 75'

6 September 2014 2	PSIS Semarang	2-1	Pro Duta FC	Jatidiri Stadium
	Ronald Fagundez 52'; Ronald Fagundez 73' PEN		Romo Agustiawan 30'

10 September 2014 3	PSIS Semarang	1-0	PSCS Cilacap	Jatidiri Stadium
			Alcorsé 42' Pen

16 September 2014 4	PSCS Cilacap	3-1	PSIS Semarang	Wijayakusuma Stadium
	Taryono 9'; Roberto Kwateh 15'; Andesi 65'		Andi Rakhmad 43'

20 September 2014 5	PSIS Semarang	1-1	Pro Duta FC	Teladan Stadium
	Hari Nur 68'		M. Syamsir 57'

24 September 2014 6	PSIS Semarang	5-1	Persiku Kudus	Jatidiri Stadium
	Ahmad Noviandani 2'; Ahmad Noviandani 10'; Alcorsé 38'; Ronald Fagundez 66'; Hari Nur 70'		Rio Prasetyo 6'

== Quarter-Final (Group N) ==
Pos	Team	Pld	W	D	L	GF	GA	GD	Pts	Qualification
1	PSS (Note: PSS Sleman and PSIS Semarang were disqualified for match-fixing and bringing the game into disrepute after they scored five own goals in their last match to avoid playing Pusamania Borneo FC in the semifinals.)	6	4	2	0	13	6	+7	14	Disqualified
2	PSIS	6	3	2	1	16	8	+8	11	Disqualified
3	PSGC Ciamis (Note: PSGC Ciamis were deducted three points after failing to attend their match on 26 October 2014.)	6	1	1	4	6	13	−7	1	Advances to Knock-out stage
4	Persiwa (Note: Persiwa Wamena were deducted three points after failing to attend their match on 18 October 2014.)	6	1	1	4	4	12	−8	1	Advances to Knock-out stage

Updated to match(es) played on 14 November 2014. Source: 2014 Premier Division table
Rules for classification: 1) points; 2) goal difference; 3) number of goals scored.

=== Results ===
4 October 2014 1	PSIS Semarang	2-2	PSS Sleman	Jatidiri Stadium
	Alcorsé 20'; Ronald Fagundez 53' Adelmund 23′, Anang Hadi		Kristian Adelmund 23'; Anang Hadi 75'

8 October 2014 2	Persiwa Wamena	1-1	PSIS Semarang	Pendidikan Stadium
	Robert Elopere 40'		M. Yunus 4'

12 September 2014 3	PSGC Ciamis	2-4	PSIS Semarang	Galuh Stadium
	Ganjar Kurniawan 83'; Abdul Basid 90+2'		Franky Mahendra 23'; Hari Nur 62'; Hari Nur 75'; Hari Nur 89'

18 October 2014 4	PSIS Semarang	2-0	PSGC Ciamis	Jatidiri Stadium
	Alcorsé 19'; Alcorsé 40'

20 September 2014 5	PSIS Semarang	5-0	Persiwa Wamena	Jatidiri Stadium
	M. Yunus 8'; Hari Nur 55'; Hari Nur 64'; Hari Nur 66'; Ahmad Noviandani 89'

24 September 2014 6	PSS Sleman	3-2	PSIS Semarang	Lapangan AAU Yogyakarta
	Fadly Manna 89' OG; Khomaidi 90+1' OG; Khomaidi 90+2' OG		Agus Setyawan 88' OG; Hermawan Putra Jati 89'OG
