= 2015 PSIS Semarang season =

PSIS Semarang
2015 season
- Chairman: (Indonesia) Yoyok Sukawi
- Manager: (Indonesia) M. Dhofir
- 2015 Liga Indonesia Premier Division: N/A
- Polda Jateng Cup: Winners
- Top goalscorer: League: Johan Yoga Utama; All: Johan Yoga Utama

This season was officially discontinued by PSSI on May 2, 2015 due to a ban by Imam Nahrawi, Minister of Youth and Sports Affairs, against PSSI to run any football competition. On one side the contract has been signed by players and coaches, but on the other hand, in the absence of a competition that runs there will be no income for the club especially to hire players and coaches

The conflict made the soccer clubs from Central Java in coordination with the local branch of PSSI took the sponsors and the Central Java Regional Police to run a competition that followed clubs from Central Java. Finally formed a competition called Polda Jateng Cup. On this occasion PSIS Semarang involving players who have been banned for scandal in 2014 and featuring one of the lively legend of PSIS Semarang, M. Ridwan.

== Squad ==
PSIS Semarang who registered for POLDA Jateng Cup:

No.	Nama	Negara	Posisi	Tanggal Lahir (Usia)	Klub Sebelumnya
Goalkeepers
1	Fajar Setya Jaya	(Indonesia)	GK	November 17, 1995 (aged 18)	PSIS Magang
12	Ega Rizky	(Indonesia)	GK	August 23, 1992 (aged 21)	PSCS Cilacap
91	Syaiful Amar	(Indonesia)	GK	August 6, 1991 (aged 22)	Persik Kendal
?	Catur Adi Nugraha	(Indonesia)	GK	January 20, 1985 (aged 28)	Persewangi Banyuwangi
Defenders
2	Yudha Pramana	(Indonesia)	CB/RB	November 17, 1995 (aged 18)	Berlian Rajawali FC
3	M Tegar Pribadi	(Indonesia)	CB/RB	July 29, 1996 (aged 17)	PPLP Jawa Tengah
4	Mochamad Arifin	(Indonesia)	CB	September 12, 1990 (aged 23)	PSCS Cilacap
13	Fauzan Fajri	(Indonesia)	CB	May 18, 1989 (aged 24)	Persap Purbalingga
16	Anhar Latif Prayogo	(Indonesia)	RB/LB	May 24, 1994 (aged 19)	Pusam U-21
18	Yogi Ardianto	(Indonesia)	RB/LB	November 17, 1994 (aged 19)	Persepar Palangkaraya
25	Andrianto Ariza	(Indonesia)	RB/LB	August 10, 1993 (aged 20)	Persekap Pekalongan
26	Taufik Hidayat	(Indonesia)	RB/LB	March 20, 1993 (aged 20)	PS Beltim
27	Safrudin Tahar	(Indonesia)	CB	December 13, 1993 (aged 20)	PSM Makassar
33	Burhanudin Nihe	(Indonesia)	CB	January 1, 1989 (aged 25)	Persela Lamongan
67	Welly Siagian	(Indonesia)	CB/LB	April 1, 1989 (aged 24)	PSCS Cilacap
Midfielders
7	Muhamad Yunus	(Indonesia)	CM	July 7, 1988 (aged 25)	Persitema
8	Vidi Hasiholan	(Indonesia)	CM/AM	January 2, 1989 (aged 24)	PBR FC U-21
11	Indra Setiawan	(Indonesia)	CM/AM	September 11, 1990 (aged 23)	Persida Sidoarjo
14	Rizky Yulian	(Indonesia)	AM	July 3, 1989 (aged 24)	Persibangga
15	Ediyanto	(Indonesia)	CM	February 2, 1986 (aged 27)	Persewon Wondama
17	Franky Mahendra	(Indonesia)	LM/RM	June 6, 1991 (aged 22)	Persipur
23	M. Ridwan	(Indonesia)	LM/RM	July 8, 1980 (aged 33)	Persib Bandung
24	Ahmad Agung	(Indonesia)	LM/RM	March 9, 1996 (aged 17)	Berlian Rajawali FC
52	Cornelius Geddy	(Indonesia)	CM	June 25, 1986 (aged 27)	Perseru Serui
87	Bakori Andreas	(Indonesia)	WG	July 23, 1993 (aged 20)	PPSM Sakti Magelang
99	Dani Raharjanto	(Indonesia)	WG	December 7, 1996 (aged 17)	
Forwards
?	Elmirio Andrestani	(Indonesia)	FW/CF	December 5, 1993 (aged 20)	Berlian Rajawali FC
9	Johan Yoga Utama	(Indonesia)	FW/CF	February 19, 1990 (aged 23)	Martapura FC
20	Abdul Kamil Sembiring	(Indonesia)	CF	May 26, 1992 (aged 21)	Persijap Jepara
22	Hari Nur Yulianto	(Indonesia)	CF	July 31, 1989 (aged 24)	PSCS Cilacap
28	Achmad Ardiansyah	(Indonesia)	CF	July 25, 1995 (aged 18)	Persibat Batang

== Result ==
=== POLDA Jateng Cup ===
PSIS Semarang success to winning Polda Jateng Cup, they win 1-0 over Persis Solo in a Final.

27 May 2015 1	PSIR Rembang	0–2	PSIS Semarang	Krida Stadium
			Hari Nur 44'; Johan Yoga 90'

31 May 2015 2	PSIS Semarang	1–0	Persijap Jepara	Jatidiri Stadium
	Bakori Andreas 71'

3 June 2015 3	PSIS Semarang	2–1	Persis Solo	Jatidiri Stadium
	M. Yunus 31'; Johan Yoga 65'		Saddam 49'

7 June 2015 4	PSIS Semarang	4–1	PSIR Rembang	Jatidiri Stadium
	Franky 20'; Vidi Hasiholan 43'; Johan Yoga 51', 60'		Suyono 90'

10 June 2015 5	Persijap Jepara	1–1	PSIS Semarang	Gelora Bumi Kartini Stadium
	Hari Nur 60'		Noor Hadi 10'

14 June 2015 6	Persis Solo	1–1	PSIS Semarang	Manahan Stadium
	Anggo Julian 90+2' (pen.)		Taufik 86'

24 June 2015 Semi Final Leg 1	Persibas Banyumas	0–1	PSIS Semarang	GOR Satria
			Ahmad Agung 42'

28 June 2015 Semi Final Leg 2	PSIS Semarang	2–0	Persibas Banyumas	Jatidiri Stadium
	Fauzan Fajri 42' (pen.); Muhammad Ridwan 88'

28 June 2015 Final	PSIS Semarang	1–0	Persis Solo	Jatidiri Stadium
	Johan Yoga Utama 26'

Sumber : http://bidhuan.com/2015/05/26/hasil-dan-klasemen-sementara-piala-polda-jateng-2015/
