= 2018 Liga 2 (Indonesia) final =

2018 Liga 2 final
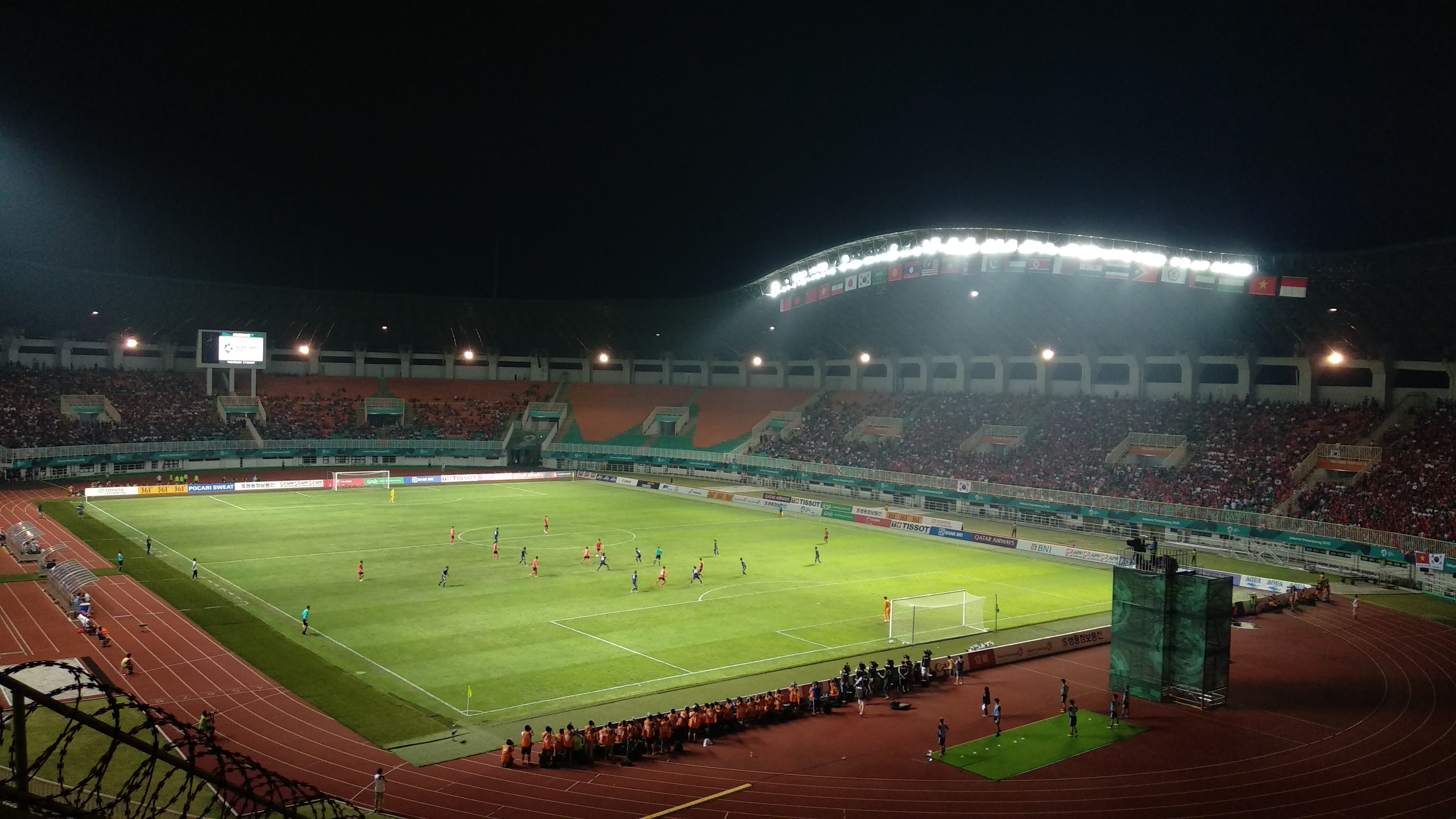
- The Pakansari in Cibinong hosted the final
- Event: 2018 Liga 2
| Semen Padang | PSS |
| 0 | 2 |
- Date: 4 December 2018
- Venue: Pakansari Stadium, Cibinong
- Man of the Match: Ichsan Pratama (PSS)
- Referee: Dwi Purba (Indonesia)

The 2018 Liga 2 final was the final match of the 2018 Liga 2, the ninth season of second-tier competition in Indonesia organised by PT Liga Indonesia Baru, and the second season since it was renamed from the Liga Indonesia Premier Division to the Liga 2. It was played at the Pakansari Stadium in Cibinong, Bogor, West Java on 4 December 2018.

PSS won the match 2–0 to secure their first title in this competition.

== Road to the final ==
Note: In all results below, the score of the finalist is given first (H: home; A: away).

| Semen Padang | | | | Round | PSS | | | |
|---|---|---|---|---|---|---|---|---|
| West region winners: Pos / Team / Pld / Pts; 1 / Semen Padang (P) / 22 / 39; 2 / Persiraja / 22 / 35; 3 / Aceh United / 22 / 35; 4 / Persita / 22 / 35; 5 / Persis / 22 / 35; 6 / PSPS Riau / 22 / 31; 7 / Perserang / 22 / 31; 8 / Cilegon United / 22 / 29; 9 / Persibat / 22 / 28; 10 / Persika (R) / 22 / 24; 11 / PSIR (R) / 22 / 22; 12 / Persik Kendal (R) / 22 / 22; Source: Babak Penyisihan Liga 2 (P) Promoted; (R) Relegated | | | | First round | East region winners: Pos / Team / Pld / Pts; 1 / PSS (C, P) / 22 / 43; 2 / Kalteng Putra (P) / 22 / 39; 3 / Madura / 22 / 39; 4 / PSMP / 22 / 37; 5 / Martapura / 22 / 31; 6 / PSIM / 22 / 31; 7 / Blitar United / 22 / 31; 8 / Persiba / 22 / 27; 9 / PSBS / 22 / 26; 10 / Persegres (R) / 22 / 26; 11 / Semeru (R) / 22 / 19; 12 / Persiwa (R) / 22 / 7; Source: Babak Penyisihan Liga 2 (C) Champions; (P) Promoted; (R) Relegated | | | |
| Group A winners: Pos / Team / Pld / Pts; 1 / Semen Padang / 6 / 10; 2 / Kalteng Putra / 6 / 10; 3 / PSMP / 6 / 9; 4 / Aceh United / 6 / 5; Source: Babak 8 Besar Liga 2 | | | | Second round | Group B winners: Pos / Team / Pld / Pts; 1 / PSS / 6 / 10; 2 / Persita / 6 / 10; 3 / Persiraja / 6 / 9; 4 / Madura / 6 / 6; Source: Babak 8 Besar Liga 2 | | | |
| Opponent | Agg. | 1st leg | 2nd leg | Knockout round | Opponent | Agg. | 1st leg | 2nd leg |
| Persita | 3–2 | 0–1 (A) | 3–1 (H) | Semi-finals | Kalteng Putra | 2–0 | 0–0 (A) | 2–0 (H) |

== Match ==
=== Details ===
4 December 2018
18:30 UTC+7

| Semen Padang | 0–2 | PSS |
|---|---|---|
| | Report | Gonzáles 18'; Lastori 27' |

Pakansari Stadium, Cibinong
Referee: Dwi Purba

| Semen Padang | PSS |

| GK | 21 | (Indonesia) Rendy Oscario |
| RB | 11 | (Indonesia) Hengky Ardiles (c) | | (substituted off) 46' |
| CB | 28 | (Indonesia) Ngurah Nanak |
| CB | 5 | (Indonesia) Novrianto |
| LB | 15 | (Indonesia) Leo Guntara | (yellow card) 88' |
| CM | 19 | (Indonesia) Manda Cingi | (yellow card) 43' |
| CM | 7 | (Indonesia) Rudi | | (substituted off) 41' |
| CM | 6 | (Indonesia) Fridolin Yoku |
| RW | 91 | (Indonesia) Afriansyah | | (substituted off) 84' |
| LW | 88 | (Indonesia) Irsyad Maulana |
| CF | 14 | (Indonesia) Riski Novriansyah |
Substitutes:
| GK | 20 | (Indonesia) Guntur Pranata |
| DF | 2 | (Indonesia) Ibrahim Sanjaya | | (substituted in) 46' |
| DF | 32 | (Indonesia) Ahmad Bahtiar |
| MF | 10 | (Indonesia) Abdul Lestaluhu | | (substituted in) 84' |
| MF | 31 | (Indonesia) Rosad Setiawan |
| MF | 23 | (Indonesia) Firman Septian | | (substituted in) 41' |
| FW | 99 | (Indonesia) Mardiono |
Head Coach:
(Indonesia) Syafrianto Rusli

Starting XI

| GK | 21 | (Indonesia) Ega Rizky |
| RB | 3 | (Indonesia) Bagus Nirwanto (c) |
| CB | 55 | (Indonesia) Asyraq Gufron |
| CB | 44 | (Indonesia) Ikhwan Ciptady |
| LB | 28 | (Indonesia) Aditya Dewa |
| DM | 25 | (Indonesia) Amarzukih | (yellow card) 55' |
| CM | 92 | (Indonesia) Dave Mustaine | (yellow card) 64' |
| CM | 23 | (Indonesia) Ichsan Pratama | | (substituted off) 77' |
| RW | 22 | (Indonesia) Rifal Lastori | | (substituted off) 64' |
| LW | 15 | (Indonesia) Rangga Muslim | | (substituted off) 89' |
| CF | 10 | (Indonesia) Cristian Gonzáles |
Substitutes:
| GK | 18 | (Indonesia) Yoewanto Setya Beny |
| DF | 2 | (Indonesia) Akbar Zakaria |
| DF | 31 | (Indonesia) Jodi Kustiawan |
| MF | 8 | (Indonesia) Taufiq Febriyanto | | (substituted in) 89' |
| MF | 87 | (Indonesia) Ilhamul Irhaz | | (substituted in) 77' |
| FW | 16 | (Indonesia) Qischil Minny |
| FW | 41 | (Indonesia) Slamet Budiyono | | (substituted in) 64' |
Head Coach:
(Indonesia) Seto Nurdiantoro

Man of the Match:
Ichsan Pratama (PSS)

Assistant referees:
Agus Mulyadi
Dedek Duha
Fourth official:
Annas Apriliandi

Match rules

- 90 minutes.
- 30 minutes of extra time if necessary.
- Penalty shoot-out if scores still level.
- Seven named substitutes, of which up to three may be used.

=== Statistics ===
First half
| Statistic | Semen Padang | PSS |
|---|---|---|
| Goals scored | 0 | 2 |
| Shot off target | 3 | 1 |
| Shots on target | 1 | 5 |
| Fouls | 5 | 5 |
| Yellow cards | 1 | 0 |
| Red cards | 0 | 0 |
| Offsides | 0 | 0 |
| Corners | 4 | 1 |
| Ball possession | 51% | 49% |

Second half
| Statistic | Semen Padang | PSS |
|---|---|---|
| Goals scored | 0 | 0 |
| Shot off target | 6 | 2 |
| Shots on target | 0 | 4 |
| Fouls | 11 | 4 |
| Yellow cards | 1 | 2 |
| Red cards | 0 | 0 |
| Offsides | 1 | 3 |
| Corners | 8 | 0 |
| Ball possession | 61% | 39% |

Overall
| Statistic | Semen Padang | PSS |
|---|---|---|
| Goals scored | 0 | 2 |
| Shot off target | 9 | 3 |
| Shots on target | 1 | 9 |
| Fouls | 16 | 9 |
| Yellow cards | 2 | 2 |
| Red cards | 0 | 0 |
| Offsides | 1 | 3 |
| Corners | 12 | 1 |
| Ball possession | 56% | 44% |
