= Fridolin Yoku =

Indonesian footballer

Personal information
- Full name: Fridolin Kristof Yoku
- Date of birth: 10 February 1997 (age 29)
- Place of birth: Sentani, Indonesia
- Height: 1.71 m (5 ft 7 in)
- Position: Defensive midfielder

Youth career
- 2014–2016: Frenz United
- 2016: Persipura Jayapura
- 2017: Semen Padang

Senior career*
Years	Team	Apps	(Gls)
2017–2019	Semen Padang	53	(0)
2020–2025	Persipura Jayapura	68	(1)
2026	PSIS Semarang	0	(0)
- * Club domestic league appearances and goals as of 19 October 2025

Fridolin Kristof Yoku (born 10 February 1997) is an Indonesian professional footballer who plays as a defensive midfielder.

== Club career ==
=== Semen Padang ===
In 2017, Yoku signed a year contract with Liga 1 club Semen Padang. He made his league debut on 4 May 2017 in a match against Bali United at the Kapten I Wayan Dipta Stadium, Gianyar.

=== Persipura Jayapura ===
He was signed for Persipura Jayapura to play in Liga 1 in the 2020 season. Yoku made his league debut on 13 March 2020 in a match against Persebaya Surabaya at the Gelora Bung Tomo Stadium, Surabaya. This season was suspended on 27 March 2020 due to the COVID-19 pandemic. The season was abandoned and was declared void on 20 January 2021.

== Career statistics ==
=== Club ===
As of match played 19 October 2025

Club	Season	League			Cup		Continental		Other		Total	
Club	Season	Division	Apps	Goals	Apps	Goals	Apps	Goals	Apps	Goals	Apps	Goals
Semen Padang	2017	Liga 1	6	0	0	0	0	0	0	0	6	0
Semen Padang	2018	Liga 2	22	0	0	0	0	0	0	0	22	0
Semen Padang	2019	Liga 1	25	0	0	0	0	0	0	0	25	0
Semen Padang	Total		53	0	0	0	0	0	0	0	53	0
Persipura Jayapura	2020	Liga 1	1	0	0	0	0	0	0	0	1	0
Persipura Jayapura	2021–22	Liga 1	21	1	0	0	0	0	0	0	21	1
Persipura Jayapura	2022–23	Liga 2	4	0	0	0	–		0	0	4	0
Persipura Jayapura	2023–24	Liga 2	16	0	0	0	–		0	0	16	0
Persipura Jayapura	2024–25	Liga 2	21	0	0	0	–		0	0	21	0
Persipura Jayapura	2025–26	Championship	5	0	0	0	–		0	0	5	0
Persipura Jayapura	Total		68	1	0	0	0	0	0	0	68	1
PSIS Semarang	2025–26	Championship	0	0	0	0	–		0	0	0	0
Career total			121	1	0	0	0	0	0	0	121	1

== Honours ==
=== Club ===
Semen Padang

- Liga 2 runner-up: 2018
