= Ilham Irhaz =

Indonesian footballer

Personal information
- Full name: Muhammad Ilhamul Irhaz
- Date of birth: 26 April 1992 (age 34)
- Place of birth: Malang, Indonesia
- Height: 1.77 m (5 ft 10 in)
- Position: Attacking midfielder

Team information
- Current team: Persibangga Purbalingga
- Number: 87

Youth career
- 2009: Persema Malang
- 2010: Persatu Tuban
- 2011: PON Central Kalimantan

Senior career*
| Years | Team | Apps | (Gls) |
| 2012–2013 | Persekat Tegal | 17 | (2) |
| 2013–2014 | Persekam Metro | 25 | (8) |
| 2015–2016 | PSS Sleman | 19 | (7) |
| 2017 | Persiba Balikpapan | 18 | (1) |
| 2018 | PSS Sleman | 13 | (0) |
| 2018–2019 | Persis Solo | 22 | (0) |
| 2020 | Persijap Jepara | 0 | (0) |
| 2021–2022 | PSIM Yogyakarta | 11 | (2) |
| 2022–2024 | Sulut United | 17 | (1) |
| 2024–2025 | RANS Nusantara | 17 | (0) |
| 2025–2026 | Persitema Temanggung | 2 | (0) |
| 2026– | Persibangga Purbalingga | 1 | (0) |
- * Club domestic league appearances and goals as of 14 November 2026 (UTC)

Muhammad Ilhamul Irhaz (born 26 April 1992) is an Indonesian professional footballer who plays as an attacking midfielder for Liga Nusantara club Persibangga Purbalingga.

== Club career ==
=== Persiba Balikpapan ===
In March 2017, Ilham signed a contract with Persiba Balikpapan. He made his league debut in a 0–1 lose against Arema on 1 May 2017. On 17 September 2017, Ilham scored his first league goal for Persiba against Persipura Jayapura as his team loss 4–2. He contributed 18 league appearances and scored one goal.

=== Return to PSS Sleman ===
In January 2018, Ilham decided return dan signed a contract with PSS Sleman. He had a good season in this season with PSS Sleman, while helping the club win the championship Liga 2 this season.

=== Persis Solo ===
On 28 February 2019, Ilham signed a one-year contract with Persis Solo. He made his league debut in a 0–0 draw against Mitra Kukar on 22 June 2019.

=== Persijap Jepara ===
In 2020, Ilham signed for other Liga 2 club Persijap Jepara. This season was suspended on 27 March 2020 due to the COVID-19 pandemic. The season was abandoned and was declared void on 20 January 2021.

=== PSIM Yogyakarta ===
Ilham was signed for PSIM Yogyakarta to play in Liga 2 in the 2021–22 season. He made his league debut on 26 September 2021 in a 0–1 lose against PSCS Cilacap.

=== Sulut United ===
Ahead of the 2022–23 season, Ilham signed a contract with Sulut United. He made his league debut in a 0–1 away lose against Persipal BU on 4 September 2022.

== Honours ==
=== Club ===
PSS Sleman

- Liga 2: 2018
