= Hari Nur Yulianto =

Indonesian footballer

Personal information
- Full name: Hari Nur Yulianto
- Date of birth: 31 July 1989 (age 37)
- Place of birth: Kendal, Indonesia
- Height: 1.78 m (5 ft 10 in)
- Position: Forward

Team information
- Current team: PSIS Semarang
- Number: 22

Senior career*
Years	Team	Apps	(Gls)
2010	PSCS Cilacap	9	(2)
2011–2012	Persibangga Purbalingga	28	(16)
2013–2023	PSIS Semarang	183	(69)
2023–2025	Malut United	29	(3)
2025–2026	PSPS Pekanbaru	20	(4)
2026–	PSIS Semarang	8	(2)
- * Club domestic league appearances and goals as of 21 November 2026

Hari Nur Yulianto (born 31 July 1989) is an Indonesian professional footballer who plays as a forward for Championship club PSIS Semarang.

== Club career ==
=== PSCS Cilacap ===
Hari Nur started his career in 2010–11 Liga Indonesia Premier Division. He made 2 goals in 9 games.

=== Persibangga Purbalingga ===
He was signed for Persibangga Purbalingga to play in the Indonesian Premier Division in the 2011-12 season.

=== PSIS Semarang ===
He started his season debut with PSIS in 2013 by scoring 6 goals but only managed to bring PSIS Semarang to the quarter-final. In the following season (2014), his name became increasingly famous when he had a duet with Julio Alcorsé. He became the fourth top scorer of the 2014 Liga Indonesia Premier Division, in this 2014 season he also managed to score 2 hat-tricks, each against PSGC Ciamis on 12 October 2014 and Persiwa Wamena on 22 October 2014, both in the top 8 of the 2014 Indonesian Premier Division. In his second season with PSIS Semarang Hari reunited with the Central Java Contingent in the football team for PON XVIII including Fauzan Fajri, Saptono, Vidi Hasiholan, Eli Nasokha, and Ivo Andre Wibowo who had won bronze together at the XVIII PON event.

== Honours ==
=== Club ===
PSIS Semarang

- Liga 2 third place (play-offs): 2017

Malut United

- Liga 2 third place (play-offs): 2023–24
