= 2011 Indonesian Futsal League =

SPECS LIGA FUTSAL INDONESIA V-2011

Tournament details
- Host country: Indonesia
- Dates: April 19 - July 24
- Teams: 10
- Venue(s): 4 (in 3 host cities)

Final positions
- Champions: Pelindo II (1st title)

Tournament statistics
- Matches played: 24
- Goals scored: 207 (8.63 per match)
- Top scorer(s): Sandy Gempur (17)

The 2011 Indonesian Futsal League (known as Specs Liga Futsal Indonesia V for sponsorship reason) is the 5th edition of Indonesian Futsal League (IFL), a nationwide futsal competition organized by the Football Association of Indonesia. This competition was scheduled to be held in 3 cities: Jakarta (Vidi Arena Pancoran & Tennis indoor GBK Stadium), Lampung (Saburai) and Palembang.

== Participating clubs ==
Ten professional clubs will be participating in this competition.

Team	City/Province	2010 season
Bank Sumut FC	Medan, North Sumatra	
Electric PLN	Jakarta	2010 Indonesian Futsal League Runner-up
Futsal Kota Bandung	Bandung, West Java	4th place at 2010 Indonesian Futsal League
Harimau Rawa	Pekanbaru, Riau	2010 Indonesian Futsal League Champions
Jatim Futsal	Surabaya, East Java	
Jaya Kencana United	South Tangerang, Banten	Amateur Futsal League 2011 Runner-up
JICT Jakarta	Jakarta	Amateur Futsal League 2011 Champion
Limus IBM Jaya	West Java	
Pelindo II	Jakarta	3rd at 2010 Indonesian Futsal League
IM Sriwijaya United	Palembang, South Sumatra	previously named Isen Mulang

== Regular season table ==
- The first series held in Vidi Arena, Pancoran, Jakarta on 19–26 April 2011
- The second series held in Saburai Arena, Lampung on 31 May - 3 June 2011
- The third series held in Palembang, South Sumatra on 5–8 July 2011
- All times are Waktu Indonesia bagian Barat (WIB) – UTC+7

Key to colours in group tables
advanced to the 2011 Indonesian Futsal League Final Four
relegation to the 2012 Premier Division

Rank	Team	Pld	W	D	L	GF	GA	GD	Pts	Qualification or relegation
1	Electric PLN	6	5	0	1	41	16	+25	15	2011 Indonesian Futsal League Final Four
2	IM Sriwijaya	6	4	2	0	35	17	+18	14	2011 Indonesian Futsal League Final Four
3	Futsal Kota Bandung	6	4	1	1	28	17	+11	13	2011 Indonesian Futsal League Final Four
4	Harimau Rawa	6	3	1	2	21	22	−1	10	2011 Indonesian Futsal League Final Four
5	Pelindo II	6	3	0	3	21	18	+3	9	
6	JICT Futsal	6	2	1	3	30	31	−1	7	
7	Jaya Kencana United	6	0	1	5	18	43	−25	1	
8	Bank Sumut FC	6	0	0	6	13	39	−26	0	
9	Jatim Futsal (DQ) (R)	0	0	0	0	0	0	0	0	Relegated to Premier Division
10	Limus IBM Jaya (DQ) (R)	0	0	0	0	0	0	0	0	Relegated to Premier Division

Updated to games played on 5 May 2011
(C) = Champion; (R) = Relegated; (P) = Promoted; (O) = Play-off winner; (A) = Advances to a further round.
Only applicable when the season is not finished:
(Q) = Qualified to the phase of tournament indicated; (TQ) = Qualified to tournament, but not yet to the particular phase indicated; (DQ) = Disqualified from tournament.

== Final four ==
The knockout phase is scheduled on 22 July & 24 July 2011.

- All matches were played in Tennis Indoor Gelora Bung Karno Stadium, Senayan, Jakarta
- All times are Waktu Indonesia bagian Barat (WIB) – UTC+7

Semi-finals
2 July 2011 - Tennis Indoor GBK
Electric PLN	0
Futsal Kota Bandung	0
2 July 2011 - Tennis Indoor GBK
Pelindo II	0
IM Sriwijaya United	0

Final
21 July 2011 - Tennis Indoor GBK
Pelindo II	2
Electric PLN	1
Third place
21 July 2011 - Tennis Indoor GBK
Futsal Kota Bandung	5
IM Sriwijaya United	2

=== Semi-finals ===
2 July 2011
15:30 WIB

Electric PLN	v	Futsal Kota Bandung

Tennis Indoor GBK
2 July 2011
19:00 WIB

Pelindo II	v	IM Sriwijaya United

Tennis Indoor GBK

=== Third Place ===
21 July 2011
15:30 WIB

Futsal Kota Bandung	5 - 2	IM Sriwijaya United

Tennis Indoor GBK

=== Final ===
21 July 2011
19:00 WIB

Pelindo II	2 - 1	Electric PLN

Tennis Indoor GBK
