= Adithya Jorry Guruh =

Indonesian footballer

Jorry Guruh
Personal information
- Full name: Adithya Jorry Guruh Setiawan
- Date of birth: 18 March 2001 (age 25)
- Place of birth: Rembang, Indonesia
- Height: 1.75 m (5 ft 9 in)
- Position: Forward

Team information
- Current team: Persibangga Purbalingga
- Number: 79

Youth career
- –2017: SSB Terang Bangsa
- 2018: PSIS U18
- 2019–2020: PSIS U20

Senior career*
Years	Team	Apps	(Gls)
2020–2024	PSIS Semarang	2	(0)
2022	→ Persipa Pati (loan)	0	(0)
2023	→ Persik Kendal (loan)	2	(2)
2024–2025	Semen Padang	0	(0)
2025	Kendal Tornado	2	(0)
2026–	Persibangga Purbalingga	1	(0)
- * Club domestic league appearances and goals as of 14 November 2026

Adithya Jorry Guruh Setiawan (born 18 March 2001) is an Indonesian professional footballer who plays as a forward for Liga Nusantara club Persibangga Purbalingga.

== Career ==
=== PSIS Semarang ===
He made his professional debut in the Liga 1 on 1 March 2020, against Persipura Jayapura where he played as a substitute. This season was suspended on 27 March 2020 due to the COVID-19 pandemic. The season was abandoned and was declared void on 20 January 2021.

== Career statistics ==
As of 7 November 2025

Club	Season	League		Cup		Other		Total	
Club	Season	Apps	Goals	Apps	Goals	Apps	Goals	Apps	Goals
PSIS Semarang	2020	1	0	0	0	0	0	1	0
PSIS Semarang	2021–22	1	0	0	0	0	0	1	0
Persipa Pati (loan)	2022–23	0	0	0	0	0	0	0	0
Persik Kendal (loan)	2023–24	2	2	0	0	0	0	2	2
Semen Padang	2024–25	0	0	0	0	0	0	0	0
Kendal Tornado	2025–26	2	0	0	0	0	0	2	0
Career total		6	2	0	0	0	0	6	2
