= 2010 Indonesian Futsal League =

Indonesian Futsal League
- Season: 2010
- Champions: Harimau Rawa
- AFC Futsal Club Championship: Harimau Rawa
- Matches: 62
- Top goalscorer: Firman Septian (20)

2010 Indonesian Futsal League (IFL) is the 4th edition of Indonesian Futsal League, which is organized by the PSSI (Indonesian football association). The competition will be held in 3 consecutive series (full competition) in 3 cities (Jakarta, Riau and Surabaya).

The winner of this competition will represent Indonesia in the AFC Futsal Club Championship.

== Participating clubs ==
Eight clubs are participating in this competition:

- Electric PLN (Jakarta)
- Pelindo II (Jakarta)
- Limus IBM Jaya (West Java)
- Futsal Kota Bandung (West Java)
- Jatim Futsal (Surabaya)
- Bank Sumut FC (North Sumatra)
- Harimau Rawa (Riau)
- Isen Mulang (Central Kalimantan)

== Competition system ==
=== Regular stages ===
- First series, starts on 2–8 August 2010 in Jakarta
- Second series, starts on 30 September - 3 October 2010 in Riau
- Third series, starts on 14–17 October in Surabaya

=== Final four ===
The best four clubs in regular stage will qualify to the final four stage which will be held in Jakarta, 1–3 November 2010.

== Final four ==
=== Third Placed ===
November 24, 2010
19.00 WIB

Pelindo II	5 – 2	Futsal Kota Bandung
Indra 4', 32'; Zulfikar 22'; Taufiqurahman 33'	Report	19' Julinur; 40' Ilham; 38' (og.) Ardi

Tenis Indor Gelora Bung Karno Stadium, Jakarta
Attendance: 1,305

=== Final ===
November 24, 2010
21.00 WIB

Harimau Rawa	2 – 2 (a.e.t.) (HT : 0 – 0)	Electric PLN
Stevanus 24'; Sandy 26'	Report	37' Maulid; 40' Deny
Penalties
Ali Khaidar (penalty missed); Chaca (penalty scored); Stevanus (penalty scored); Rhandias (penalty scored); Vennard (penalty scored); Sandy (penalty scored); Sulaiman (penalty scored); Hari (penalty scored); Silitonga (penalty scored); Jailani (penalty scored); Ahmad S. (penalty scored); Junaedi (penalty scored)	11 – 10	(penalty scored) Amril Daulay; (penalty scored) Hafit Tamini; (penalty missed) Badriana; (penalty scored) Irwan; (penalty scored) Deny; (penalty scored) Samsul; (penalty scored) Syehrian; (penalty scored) Trisan; (penalty scored) Junianto; (penalty scored) Saktiawan; (penalty scored) Ade; (penalty missed) Dede S.

Tenis Indor Gelora Bung Karno Stadium, Jakarta
Attendance: 1,305

== Individual Award ==
=== Top Scorers ===
Scorer	Club	Goals
(Indonesia) Firman Septian	Limus IBM Jaya	20

=== Best Players ===
Player	Club
(Indonesia) Socrates Matulessy	Harimau Rawa
