= Lorensius Sabda =

Indonesian footballer (born 2000

Personal information
- Full name: Lorensius Amanat Sabda
- Date of birth: 14 January 2000 (age 26)
- Place of birth: West Kutai Regency, Indonesia
- Height: 1.75 m (5 ft 9 in)
- Position: Winger

Team information
- Current team: PSIS Semarang
- Number: 77

Senior career*
Years	Team	Apps	(Gls)
2021–2022	Persikutim Kutai Timur		
2022–2023	Serpong City		
2023–2026	Persiba Balikpapan	50	(10)
2026–	PSIS Semarang	8	(2)
- * Club domestic league appearances and goals as of 21 November 2026

Lorensius Amanat Sabda (born 14 January 2000) is an Indonesian professional footballer who plays as a winger for Championship club PSIS Semarang.

== Early life ==
Lorensius Sabda was born on 14 January 2000 in West Kutai Regency, East Kalimantan, Indonesia.

== Club career ==
=== Persiba Balikpapan ===
Sabda played for Persiba Balikpapan in the Liga 2 during the 2023–24 season. He made 8 appearances during the competition.

In the 2024–25 Liga Nusantara, Sabda made 15 appearances and scored eight goals for Persiba Balikpapan. He was used primarily in a wide attacking role.

During the 2025–26 Championship, Sabda made 27 appearances and scored two goals for Persiba Balikpapan. He scored in scored a goal in the 18th minute of the relegation play-off match against Persekat Tegal on 8 May 2026.

=== PSIS Semarang ===
On 5 July 2026, PSIS Semarang announced the signing of Sabda from Persiba Balikpapan. He joined the club as a winger ahead of the 2026–27 Championship season.

Sabda made an immediate impact during his first appearance for PSIS in a pre-season friendly against Persebaya Surabaya, scoring twice after coming on as a second-half substitute.

On 11 September 2026, Sabda scored a goal in his debut match against PSPS Pekanbaru at the Jatidiri Stadium, Semarang.
