= Football at the Brunei Merdeka Games =

Football at the Brunei Merdeka Games, known as Sultan Hassanal Bolkiah Cup, or Brunei Pesta Sukan Cup, was the sports that held during the games which was hosted by Brunei.

There were four editions of the tournament, from 1985 to 1987 and 1990.

== Results ==
Year	Champions	Score in final	Runner-up	Notes
1985	Singapore XI	1–1	Brunei	Singapore won 3–1 on pens.
1986	(Indonesia) Persib Bandung	1–0	Harimau Malaysia	
1987	(Malaysia) Johor	4–1	(Indonesia) PSIS Semarang	
1990	Thailand; Malaysia	1–1		Gold medal shared.
