= Electric PLN Futsal Club =

Indonesian futsal club

Electric PLN
- Full name: Electric PLN Futsal Club
- Founded: 2006
- League: Indonesia Pro Futsal League
- 2016: PFL, 3rd
Home colours

Electric PLN was an Indonesian futsal club, currently playing in the Indonesia Pro Futsal League. The team is located in Jakarta. It last competed in the league in the 2016 season. Right before the 2017 season started, the club pulled out of the league. If the club wanted to participate again, they have to start from the bottom division futsal competition in Indonesia, Nusantara Futsal League.

The club were no longer active to this day.

== Trophies ==
- Indonesian Futsal League
  - Champions (3): 2008, 2009, 2013
  - Runner-up (2): 2010, 2011
  - Third place (3): 2006-07, 2012, 2015
