= Ichsan Pratama =

Indonesian association footballer

Personal information
- Full name: Ichsan Pratama
- Date of birth: 9 October 1993 (age 33)
- Place of birth: Sukabumi, Indonesia
- Height: 1.71 m (5 ft 7 in)
- Position: Central midfielder

Team information
- Current team: Deltras
- Number: 22

Senior career*
Years	Team	Apps	(Gls)
2015	Persipasi Bandung Raya	0	(0)
2016	Barito Putera	11	(0)
2017	PSPS Pekanbaru	22	(3)
2018	PSS Sleman	28	(4)
2019–2020	PSIM Yogyakarta	21	(1)
2021–2024	PSMS Medan	41	(4)
2024–2025	Bekasi City	7	(0)
2025	Semen Padang	0	(0)
2025–2026	PSS Sleman	21	(1)
2026–	Deltras	1	(0)
- * Club domestic league appearances and goals as of 13 September 2026

Ichsan Pratama (born 9 October 1993) is an Indonesian professional footballer who plays as a central midfielder for Championship club Deltras.

== Club career ==
=== Barito Putera ===
Ichsan joined in the squad for the 2016 Indonesia Soccer Championship A. Ichsan made his debut against Bhayangkara F.C. in first week.

=== PSPS Pekanbaru ===
He was signed for PSPS Pekanbaru to play in Liga 2 in the 2017 season. He made 22 league appearances and scored 3 goals for PSPS Pekanbaru.

=== PSS Sleman ===
In 2018, Ichsan Pratama signed a one-year contract with Indonesian Liga 2 club PSS Sleman. On 4 December 2018 PSS successfully won the 2018 Liga 2 Final and promoted to Liga 1, after defeated Semen Padang 2–0 at the Pakansari Stadium, Cibinong. He made 28 league appearances and scored 4 goals for PSS Sleman.

=== PSIM Yogyakarta ===
He was signed for PSIM Yogyakarta to play in Liga 2 in the 2019 season.

=== PSMS Medan ===
In 2021, Ichsan Pratama signed a contract with Indonesian Liga 2 club PSMS Medan. He made his league debut on 7 October against KS Tiga Naga. Ichsan scored his first goal for PSMS in the 49th minute against Tiga Naga at the Gelora Sriwijaya Stadium, Palembang.

=== Semen Padang ===
In 2025, Ichsan Pratama signed a contract with Indonesian Liga 1 club Semen Padang.

== Career statistics ==
=== Club ===
As of match played 13 September 2026

Club	Season	League			Cup		Other		Total	
Club	Season	Division	Apps	Goals	Apps	Goals	Apps	Goals	Apps	Goals
Barito Putera	2016	ISC A	11	0	0	0	0	0	11	0
PSPS Pekanbaru	2017	Liga 2	22	3	0	0	0	0	22	3
PSS Sleman	2018	Liga 2	28	4	0	0	0	0	28	4
PSIM Yogyakarta	2019	Liga 2	20	1	0	0	0	0	20	1
PSIM Yogyakarta	2020	Liga 2	1	0	0	0	0	0	1	0
PSIM Yogyakarta	Total		21	1	0	0	0	0	21	1
PSMS Medan	2021	Liga 2	12	1	0	0	0	0	12	1
PSMS Medan	2022	Liga 2	5	0	0	0	0	0	5	0
PSMS Medan	2023–24	Liga 2	18	2	0	0	0	0	18	2
Bekasi City	2024–25	Liga 2	7	0	0	0	0	0	7	0
Semen Padang	2024–25	Liga 1	0	0	0	0	0	0	0	0
PSS Sleman	2025–26	Championship	21	1	0	0	0	0	21	1
Deltras	2026–27	Championship	1	0	0	0	0	0	1	0
Career total			146	12	0	0	0	0	146	12

== Honours ==
PSS Sleman

- Liga 2: 2018; runner up: 2025–26

Individual

- Liga 2 Best Player: 2018
