= Muhamad Yunus =

Indonesian footballer

Muhammad Yunus
Personal information
- Full name: Muhammad Yunus
- Date of birth: 7 July 1988 (age 38)
- Place of birth: Temanggung, Indonesia
- Height: 1.79 m (5 ft 10 in)
- Position: Defensive midfielder

Team information
- Current team: Persitema Temanggung (head coach)

Youth career
- PSIM Yogyakarta

Senior career*
Years	Team	Apps	(Gls)
2010–2013	Persitema Temanggung	30	(2)
2013–2019	PSIS Semarang	97	(8)
2024	Persitema Temanggung	3	(0)

Managerial career
- 2025–: Persitema Temanggung
- * Club domestic league appearances and goals as of 28 January 2024

Muhammad Yunus (born 7 July 1988) is an Indonesian professional football coach and former player who is currently the head coach at Persitema Temanggung.

== Career ==
=== Persitema Temanggung ===
M. Yunus started his professional career with the Persitema Temanggung since competing the Divisi II Liga Indonesia to promotion to Divisi I Liga Indonesia. In the 2012/2013 Liga Indonesia Premier Division, M. Yunus led Persitema Temanggung in the 5th of Fist Stage Liga Indonesia Premier Division which is the club's best achievement to date.

=== PSIS Semarang ===
In 2014 he signed a contract with PSIS Semarang. In the first season, M. Yunus became the 3rd club's top goal scorer with Ronald Fagundez for PSIS Semarang with 6 goals from 24 appearances while helping PSIS Semarang to qualify for the quarter-finals Liga Indonesia Premier Division. In the 2017, Yunus success led PSIS Semarang to promote to Liga 1.

== Honours ==
=== Club ===
PSIS Semarang

- Liga 2 third place: 2017

== Personal life ==
Yunus married Ayu Kusuma Wijaya on Saturday January 24, 2014 and has a son.
