= Novrianto =

Indonesian footballer

Personal information
- Full name: Novrianto
- Date of birth: 5 November 1992 (age 34)
- Place of birth: Koto Tangah, Padang, Indonesia
- Height: 6 ft 0 in (1.83 m)
- Position: Centre-back

Senior career*
| Years | Team | Apps | (Gls) |
| 2012–2013 | PS Bangka | 16 | (1) |
| 2014–2015 | PSPS Pekanbaru | 20 | (5) |
| 2016–2019 | Semen Padang | 42 | (2) |
| 2019 | Persita Tangerang | 15 | (0) |
| 2020 | Semen Padang | 1 | (0) |
| 2021 | PSPS Riau | 4 | (1) |

International career
| 2012 | Indonesia U23 | 0 | (0) |
- * Club domestic league appearances and goals as of 20 October 2021

Novrianto (born 5 November 1992, in Padang) is an Indonesian professional footballer who plays as a centre-back. Novrianto dubbed Andrea Pirlo of indonesia by his friend in the national team of POM ASEAN in Palembang

== Club career ==
=== Semen Padang ===
He made his debut against Bali United in four week 2016 Indonesia Soccer Championship A

=== Persita Tangerang ===
In 2019, Novrianto signed a contract with Indonesian Liga 2 club Persita Tangerang.

=== Return to Semen Padang ===
On 2020, it was confirmed that Novrianto would re-join Semen Padang, signing a year contract. This season was suspended on 27 March 2020 due to the COVID-19 pandemic. The season was abandoned and was declared void on 20 January 2021.

=== PSPS Riau ===
In 2021, Novrianto signed a contract with Indonesian Liga 2 club PSPS Riau. He made his league debut on 6 October against Semen Padang at the Gelora Sriwijaya Stadium, Palembang.

== Honours ==
Semen Padang

- Liga 2 runner-up: 2018

Persita Tangerang

- Liga 2 runner-up: 2019
