= Ega Rizky =

Indonesian footballer

Personal information
- Full name: Ega Rizky Pramana
- Date of birth: 23 August 1992 (age 34)
- Place of birth: Banyumas, Indonesia
- Height: 1.76 m (5 ft 9 in)
- Position: Goalkeeper

Team information
- Current team: PSS Sleman
- Number: 32

Youth career
- PON Jateng

Senior career*
Years	Team	Apps	(Gls)
2012–2013	Persibas Banyumas	0	(0)
2014	PSCS Cilacap	21	(0)
2014–2015	PSIS Semarang	0	(0)
2016–2018	PSCS Cilacap	33	(0)
2018–2023	PSS Sleman	66	(0)
2023–2024	Barito Putera	28	(0)
2024–	PSS Sleman	18	(0)
- * Club domestic league appearances and goals as of 4 September 2026

Ega Rizky Pramana (born 23 August 1992) is an Indonesian professional footballer who plays as a goalkeeper for Championship club PSS Sleman.

== Honours ==
=== Club ===
PSCS Cilacap

- Indonesia Soccer Championship B: 2016

PSS Sleman

- Liga 2: 2018; runner up: 2025–26
- Menpora Cup third place: 2021
