= Aldhila Ray Redondo =

Indonesian footballer

Ray Redondo
Personal information
- Full name: Aldhila Ray Redondo
- Date of birth: 19 March 1996 (age 30)
- Place of birth: Ungaran, Indonesia
- Height: 1.82 m (6 ft 0 in)
- Position: Goalkeeper

Team information
- Current team: PSIS Semarang
- Number: 96

Youth career
- PSIS Semarang
- Bhayangkara

Senior career*
Years	Team	Apps	(Gls)
2016–2018	Persipa Pati		
2018–2019	Persijap Jepara		
2019	Persiku Kudus	11	(0)
2021–2022	PSKC Cimahi	4	(0)
2022–2023	PSIS Semarang	14	(0)
2023–2025	Malut United	23	(0)
2025–2026	Garudayaksa	3	(0)
2026–	PSIS Semarang	2	(0)
- * Club domestic league appearances and goals as of 25 October 2026

Aldhila Ray Redondo (born 19 March 1996) is an Indonesian professional footballer who plays as a goalkeeper for Championship club PSIS Semarang.

== Club career ==
=== PSIS Semarang ===
He was signed for PSIS Semarang to play in Liga 1 in the 2021–22 season. Ray made his professional debut on 29 March 2022 in a match against Persela Lamongan at the Kapten I Wayan Dipta Stadium, Gianyar.

== Career statistics ==
=== Club ===
As of 25 October 2026

Club	Season	League		Cup		Continental		Other		Total	
Club	Season	Apps	Goals	Apps	Goals	Apps	Goals	Apps	Goals	Apps	Goals
Persiku Kudus	2019	11	0	0	0	–		0	0	11	0
PSKC Cimahi	2021	4	0	0	0	–		0	0	4	0
PSIS Semarang	2021–22	1	0	0	0	–		0	0	1	0
PSIS Semarang	2022–23	13	0	0	0	–		5 (Note: Appearances in Indonesia President's Cup)	0	18	0
Malut United	2023–24	18	0	0	0	–		0	0	18	0
Malut United	2024–25	5	0	0	0	–		0	0	5	0
Garudayaksa	2025–26	3	0	0	0	–		0	0	3	0
PSIS Semarang	2026–27	2	0	0	0	–		0	0	2	0
Career total		57	0	0	0	0	0	5	0	62	0

== Honours ==
Malut United

- Liga 2 third place (play-offs): 2023–24

Garudayaksa

- Championship: 2025–26
