= Rifal Lastori =

Indonesian footballer

Personal information
- Full name: Rifal Lastori
- Date of birth: 9 June 1997 (age 29)
- Place of birth: Tidore, Indonesia
- Height: 1.60 m (5 ft 3 in)
- Position: Winger

Team information
- Current team: Kendal Tornado
- Number: 86

Youth career
- 2013–2014: Borneo
- 2015: Semen Padang
- 2016: PON Maluku Utara

Senior career*
Years	Team	Apps	(Gls)
2016–2023	Borneo Samarinda	37	(2)
2017	→ PSIS Semarang (loan)	14	(4)
2018	→ PSS Sleman (loan)	24	(5)
2020	→ Sulut United (loan)	0	(0)
2021	→ RANS Cilegon (loan)	15	(2)
2022	→ PSIM Yogyakarta (loan)	7	(0)
2023–2026	Malut United	36	(2)
2025–2026	→ PSMS Medan (loan)	22	(2)
2026–	Kendal Tornado	1	(0)

International career
2015	Indonesia U19	4	(2)
- * Club domestic league appearances and goals as of 12 September 2026

Rifal Lastori (born 9 June 1997) is an Indonesian professional footballer who plays as a winger for Championship club Kendal Tornado.

== Career statistics ==
=== Club ===
As of match played 12 September 2026

Club	Season	League			Cup (Note: Includes Piala Indonesia)		Other (Note: Appearances in Indonesia President's Cup)		Total	
Club	Season	Division	Apps	Goals	Apps	Goals	Apps	Goals	Apps	Goals
Borneo	2016	ISC A	7	1	0	0	0	0	7	1
Borneo	2017	Liga 1	8	0	0	0	5	0	13	0
Borneo	2019	Liga 1	13	1	3	0	2	0	18	1
Borneo	2020	Liga 1	1	0	0	0	0	0	1	0
Borneo	2021	Liga 1	8	0	0	0	2 (Note: Appearances in Menpora Cup)	1	10	1
Borneo	2022–23	Liga 1	0	0	0	0	0	0	0	0
PSIS Semarang (loan)	2017	Liga 2	14	4	0	0	0	0	14	4
PSS Sleman (loan)	2018	Liga 2	24	5	0	0	0	0	24	5
Sulut United (loan)	2020	Liga 2	0	0	0	0	0	0	0	0
RANS Cilegon (loan)	2021	Liga 2	15	2	0	0	0	0	15	2
PSIM Yogyakarta (loan)	2022–23	Liga 2	7	0	0	0	0	0	7	0
Malut United	2023–24	Liga 2	13	0	0	0	0	0	13	0
Malut United	2024–25	Liga 1	23	2	0	0	0	0	22	2
PSMS Medan (loan)	2025–26	Liga 2	22	2	0	0	0	0	22	2
Kendal Tornado	2026–27	Championship	1	0	0	0	0	0	1	0
Career total			156	17	3	0	9	1	168	18

== Honours ==
=== Club ===
Borneo Samarinda

- Indonesia President's Cup runner-up: 2017

PSIS Semarang

- Liga 2 third place (play-offs): 2017

PSS Sleman

- Liga 2: 2018

RANS Cilegon

- Liga 2 runner-up: 2021

Malut United

- Liga 2 third place (play-offs): 2023–24

=== Individual ===
- Liga 2 Best Player: 2021
- Liga 2 Best XI: 2021
