= Fajar Setya =

Indonesian footballer

Personal information
- Full name: Fajar Setya Jaya
- Date of birth: 17 November 1995 (age 30)
- Place of birth: Semarang, Indonesia
- Height: 1.73 m (5 ft 8 in)
- Position: Goalkeeper

Team information
- Current team: Persipal Palu
- Number: 71

Youth career
- SSB Bhaladika
- 2014–2015: PSIS Semarang
- 2016: PON Jateng

Senior career*
Years	Team	Apps	(Gls)
2016–2017	PSIS Semarang	7	(0)
2018	Persiba Balikpapan	20	(0)
2019–2022	Persik Kediri	24	(0)
2022–2023	PSIS Semarang	0	(0)
2022	→ Kalteng Putra (loan)	3	(0)
2023–2024	PSKC Cimahi	6	(0)
2024	Persikas Subang	6	(0)
2025	PSPS Pekanbaru	0	(0)
2025–	Persipal Palu	0	(0)
- * Club domestic league appearances and goals as of 15 January 2024

Fajar Setya Jaya (born 17 November 1995) is an Indonesian professional footballer who plays as a goalkeeper for Liga 2 club Persipal Palu.

== Club career ==
=== Persik Kediri ===
He was signed for Persik Kediri to play in Liga 2 in the 2019 season. On 25 November 2019 Persik successfully won the 2019 Liga 2 Final and promoted to Liga 1, after defeated Persita Tangerang 3–2 at the Kapten I Wayan Dipta Stadium, Gianyar.

=== PSIS Semarang ===
PSIS Semarang officially introduced goalkeeper Fajar Setya Jaya to strengthen the team ahead of the 2022–23 Liga 1 competition. Fajar Setya himself admitted that he was happy with his return to the Laskar Mahesa Jenar squad this year. The 26-year-old player previously played for PSIS in 2016–2017 before moving on.

== Career statistics ==
=== Club ===
As of 8 December 2024

Club	Season	League			Cup		Continental		Other		Total	
Club	Season	Division	Apps	Goals	Apps	Goals	Apps	Goals	Apps	Goals	Apps	Goals
PSIS Semarang	2016	ISC B	7	0	0	0	–		0	0	7	0
PSIS Semarang	2017	Liga 2	0	0	0	0	–		0	0	0	0
PSIS Semarang	Total		7	0	0	0	0	0	0	0	7	0
Persiba Balikpapan	2018	Liga 2	20	0	0	0	–		0	0	20	0
Persik Kediri	2019	Liga 2	18	0	0	0	–		0	0	18	0
Persik Kediri	2020	Liga 1	0	0	0	0	–		0	0	0	0
Persik Kediri	2021–22	Liga 1	6	0	0	0	–		0	0	6	0
Persik Kediri	Total		44	0	0	0	0	0	0	0	44	0
PSIS Semarang	2022–23	Liga 1	0	0	0	0	–		1 (Note: Appearances in Indonesia President's Cup.)	0	1	0
Kalteng Putra (loan)	2022–23	Liga 2	3	0	0	0	–		0	0	3	0
PSKC Cimahi	2023–24	Liga 2	6	0	0	0	–		0	0	6	0
Persikas Subang	2024–25	Liga 2	6	0	0	0	–		0	0	6	0
PSPS Pekanbaru	2024–25	Liga 2	0	0	0	0	–		0	0	0	0
Persipal Palu	2025–26	Liga 2	0	0	0	0	–		0	0	0	0
Career total			66	0	0	0	0	0	1	0	67	0

== Honours ==
=== Club ===
Persik Kediri

- Liga 2: 2019
