= Dugderan =

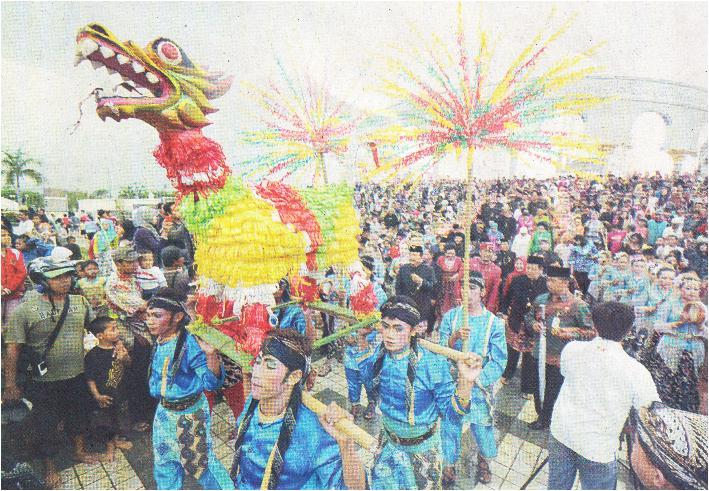
- Dugderan festival
- Date: Last ten days/seven days/last day of Sha'ban until before Ramadan
- Begins: Morning
- Ends: Dawn
- Frequency: Annually
- Locations: Semarang, Central Java, Indonesia
- Years active: 1881 - current
- Major events: Fireworks festival

Dugderan is a festival tradition practiced by Javanese residents in Semarang to mark the start of Ramadan.

In certain years, as clashing with other religious festivasl, dugderan can be merged and become multi religious in nature with participation from other religions (such as Imlek).

== Etymology ==
Dugderan refer to the sound of beduk and bamboo cannon that is associated with the month of Ramadan. The beduk will be hit seventeen times while the cannon will be fired seven times. The sound (duk duk duk by beduk and der der der by the cannon) that made by all these activities is what called as dugderan.

For Demak population, the term megengan is more popularly used.

== Tradition ==
The tradition started in 1881 at Kauman by Semarang administration.

Participant of the festival included but not limited to students, art practitioners, and residents, wearing colorful traditional clothes such as warriors costume. It is usually held from morning till evening. Based on several records, the festival may be held on the last ten days, the last seven days,or the last day of Sha'ban till before the first day of Ramadan. The festival is usually done in two parts.

The first part will involve cultural and traditional folks activities. The second part will involve mayor parade through the city center without the supporting act. Alongside the main festival, a side festival called warak festival and jipin blatenan are also held.

During the festival, Warak ngendog (an imaginary animal, with dragon as its head, camel hump and goat legs) will be paraded. The belief is that every purchase of celengan (children money box) and warak badag (children toy version of warak ngendog) will gain pahala.

The entire proceedings will use a sub Javanese language called kromo.
