= Silitonga =

Silitonga is one of Toba Batak clans originating in North Sumatra, Indonesia. People of this clan bear the clan's name as their surname. Notable people of this clan include:

- Eddy Silitonga (1949–2016), Indonesian singer
- Reuben Silitonga (born 1991), Indonesian footballer
