= Cristian Gonzáles =

Indonesian footballer (born 1976)

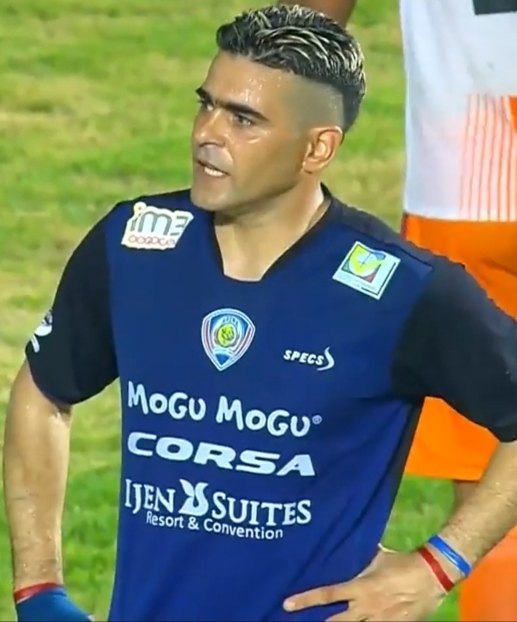
- Gonzáles playing for Arema Cronus in 2015

Personal information
- Full name: Cristian Gérard Alfaro Gonzáles
- Date of birth: 30 August 1976 (age 50)
- Place of birth: Montevideo, Uruguay
- Height: 1.77 m (5 ft 10 in)
- Position: Striker

Senior career*
Years	Team	Apps	(Gls)
1995–1999	Sud América	14	(2)
1997	→ Huracán Corrientes (loan)	4	(0)
2000–2002	Deportivo Maldonado	22	(2)
2003–2004	PSM Makassar	56	(32)
2005–2009	Persik Kediri	96	(102)
2009–2011	Persib Bandung	64	(42)
2011–2012	Putra Samarinda	32	(18)
2013–2017	Arema Cronus	120	(60)
2018	Madura United	2	(0)
2018–2019	PSS Sleman	20	(16)
2019	Bogor	2	(0)
2019–2020	PSIM Yogyakarta	18	(10)
2021–2022	RANS Nusantara	14	(8)
2022	→ PSIM Yogyakarta (loan)	4	(2)
Total		458	(286)

International career
1994–1996	Uruguay U20	26	(16)
2010–2015	Indonesia	32	(13)
Medal record
Men's football
Representing Indonesia
AFF Championship
Runner-up	2010 Indonesia & Vietnam	Team
- * Club domestic league appearances and goals

Cristian Gérard Alfaro Gonzáles (born 30 August 1976), also known as Abubakar Mustafa Habibi or Mustafa Habibi, is a former footballer who played as a striker. He was top scorer in Liga Indonesia four times, scoring a total of 249 goals in the league. Born in Uruguay and a former Uruguay youth international, he is the first naturalized player to be called up to the Indonesian national team.

== Club career ==
=== Sud América ===
In 1995, he joined the Uruguayan club Sud América. During the 28 months there, he played only once, scoring no goals. After being loaned to Huracán Corrientes, he went back to Sud America in the starting lineup. He played 12 times and scored one goal.

==== Huracán Corrientes (loan) ====
He was loaned to Huracán Corrientes where he played three times without scoring a goal.

=== Deportivo Maldonado ===
In 2000, on expiry of his contract, he moved to Deportivo Maldonado on a free transfer. He played 22 times and scored one goal.

=== PSM Makassar ===
He started playing in Indonesia in 2003, joining PSM Makassar. In that season he scored 27 goals. PSM won the Liga Indonesia in that season. He was fined Rp20 million for hitting one of the officials from Persita Tangerang and was suspended.

=== Persik Kediri ===
Free from suspension, he joined and led Persik Kediri to become champions of Liga Indonesia in 2006. In 2008, he was sentenced to suspension by the PSSI for unsportsmanlike behaviour. A financial crisis at Persik Kediri led Persik management to rationalize salaries. Gonzáles was one of the few players who was against the decision and looked for another club.

=== Persib Bandung ===
On 30 January 2009, Persib Bandung management announced that they had recruited Gonzáles with remission from PSSI chairman Nurdin Halid. Gonzáles was contracted as a loan from Persik Kediri and was paid 60 million rupiahs per month by Persib Bandung.

He debuted as a starter in the Super League for Persib against Persipura Jayapura in a 1–1 draw thanks to a goal he scored. In 2008, he played 16 times in the League and scored 14 goals, making Gonzáles a top scorer in the Super League.

After his contract at Persik Kediri expired, he was immediately hired by Persib Bandung. In the 2009–10 pre-season, he scored a goal for Persib in the East Java Government Cup. In the 2009–10 season, he scored 51 goals.

=== Persisam Putra Samarinda ===
In September 2011, Gonzáles signed a year contract with Persisam Putra Samarinda. He made his league debut on 4 December 2011 in a match against PSAP Sigli. 4 December 2011, Gonzáles scored his first goal for Persisam Putra Samarinda in the 32nd minute at the Harapan Bangsa Stadium, Banda Aceh.

=== Arema Cronus ===
After his contract at Persisam Samarinda expired. He joined Arema Cronus and wore number 10. Gonzáles made his league debut on 9 January 2013 in a match against Persidafon Dafonsoro. On 9 January 2013, Gonzáles scored his first goal for Arema in the 9th minute at the Kanjuruhan Stadium, Malang.

=== Madura United ===
He was signed for Madura United to play in Liga 1 in the 2018 season. Gonzáles made his league debut on 2 April 2018 in a match against PS TIRA at the Sultan Agung Stadium, Bantul.

=== PSS Sleman ===
In 2018, Gonzales signed a one-year contract with Indonesian Liga 2 club PSS Sleman. On 4 December 2018 PSS won the 2018 Liga 2 Final and promoted to Liga 1, after defeated Semen Padang 2–0 at the Pakansari Stadium, Cibinong. He made 19 league appearances and scored 15 goals for PSS Sleman.

=== PSIM Yogyakarta ===
He was signed for PSIM Yogyakarta to play in Liga 2 in the 2019 season. He made 17 league appearances and scored 9 goals for PSIM Yogyakarta.

=== RANS Cilegon ===
In 2021, Gonzáles signed a contract with Indonesian Liga 2 club RANS Cilegon. He made his league debut on 5 October against Persekat Tegal. Gonzáles scored his first goal for RANS Cilegon against Badak Lampung in the 18th minute at the Gelora Bung Karno Madya Stadium, Jakarta.

=== Second spell with PSIM Yogyakarta ===
He was loaned from RANS Cilegon to PSIM Yogyakarta for 2022–23 Liga 2 season, which would be his last season in his professional career.

== International career ==
Although Gonzales began his career in Indonesia as an Uruguayan, he became an Indonesian national on 3 November 2010 after a six-year wait, including not going home to his father's funeral. He is the first naturalised football player in Indonesia and the first to join the Indonesia national football team. His debut with the national team was on 21 November 2010, in a friendly game against Timor-Leste, where he scored twice in a 6–0 win.

== Career statistics ==
=== International ===
Appearances and goals by national team and year
National team	Year	Apps	Goals
Indonesia	2010	9	6
Indonesia	2011	10	5
Indonesia	2014	10	1
Indonesia	2015	2	1
Total		31	13

Scores and results list Indonesia's goal tally first, score column indicates score after each Gonzáles goal.

List of international goals scored by Cristian Gonzáles
No.	Date	Venue	Cap	Opponent	Score	Result	Competition
1	21 November 2010	Gelora Sriwijaya Stadium, Palembang, Indonesia	1	Timor-Leste	3–0	6–0	Friendly
2	21 November 2010	Gelora Sriwijaya Stadium, Palembang, Indonesia	1	Timor-Leste	4–0	6–0	Friendly
3	24 November 2010	Gelora Sriwijaya Stadium, Palembang, Indonesia	2	Chinese Taipei	1–0	2–0	Friendly
4	1 December 2010	Gelora Bung Karno Stadium, Jakarta, Indonesia	3	Malaysia	2–1	5–1	2010 AFF Championship
5	16 December 2010	Gelora Bung Karno Stadium, Jakarta, Indonesia	6	Philippines	1–0	1–0	2010 AFF Championship
6	19 December 2010	Gelora Bung Karno Stadium, Jakarta, Indonesia	7	Philippines	1–0	1–0	2010 AFF Championship
7	28 July 2011	Gelora Bung Karno Stadium, Jakarta, Indonesia	11	Turkmenistan	1–0	4–3	2014 FIFA World Cup qualification
8	28 July 2011	Gelora Bung Karno Stadium, Jakarta, Indonesia	11	Turkmenistan	2–0	4–3	2014 FIFA World Cup qualification
9	22 August 2011	Manahan Stadium, Surakarta, Indonesia	12	Palestine	2–1	4–1	Friendly
10	11 October 2011	Gelora Bung Karno Stadium, Jakarta, Indonesia	17	Qatar	1–1	2–3	2014 FIFA World Cup qualification (Note: Different qualification round as to goals 7 and 8.)
11	11 October 2011	Gelora Bung Karno Stadium, Jakarta, Indonesia	17	Qatar	2–2	2–3	2014 FIFA World Cup qualification
12	21 June 2014	Gelora Delta Stadium, Sidoarjo, Indonesia	20	Pakistan	1–0	4–0	Friendly
13	30 March 2015	Gelora Delta Stadium, Sidoarjo, Indonesia	31	Myanmar	2–0	2–1	Friendly

== Personal life ==
Gonzáles was born in Montevideo, Uruguay. He married his wife, Eva Nurida Siregar, in 1995 and has 4 children. On 9 October 2003, he converted to Islam and chose Mustafa Habibi as his Islamic name. He gained an Indonesian passport in 2010. Gonzáles also appeared in Indonesian soap operas and television commercials. After retirement, he became active in charity to support local mosques and orphanages.

One of his daughters is married to Filipino national team player Christian Rontini.

== Controversies ==
Gonzáles is known for his temper, and has been reprimanded by the Football Association of Indonesia (PSSI) on a number of occasions.

== Trivia ==
He is one of the most lethal strikers in the history of the Indonesian football competition.

While in Uruguay, he played as an attacking midfielder. He later moved to Indonesia to join PSM Makassar as a striker. Since this transition, he has played in the striker position.

Cristian Gonzales is a popular figure among Indonesians and has starred in commercials speaking Indonesian language.

In 2006, he was the most expensive player in the Liga Indonesia according to the data from the Indonesian Football Association at Rp 1.2 billion

On 21 November 2010, Gonzales debuted as a member of Indonesia's national football team in a game against Timor-Leste scoring two goals, and joined Indonesia's core national football team in the 2010 AFF Suzuki Cup.

== Honours ==
Persik Kediri

- Liga Indonesia Premier Division: 2006

Arema

- East Java Governor Cup: 2013
- Menpora Cup: 2013
- Inter Island Cup: 2014/15
- Indonesia President's Cup: 2017

PSS Sleman

- Liga 2: 2018

RANS Cilegon

- Liga 2 runner-up: 2021

Indonesia

- AFF Championship runner-up: 2010

Individual

- Liga Indonesia Premier Division Top Goalscorer: 2005, 2006, 2007–08
- Indonesia Super League Top Goalscorer: 2008–09 (shared)
- Piala Indonesia Top Goalscorer: 2010
- Indonesia President's Cup Top Goalscorer: 2017

== See also ==
- List of Indonesia international footballers born outside Indonesia
