= Warak ngendog =

Mythical creature

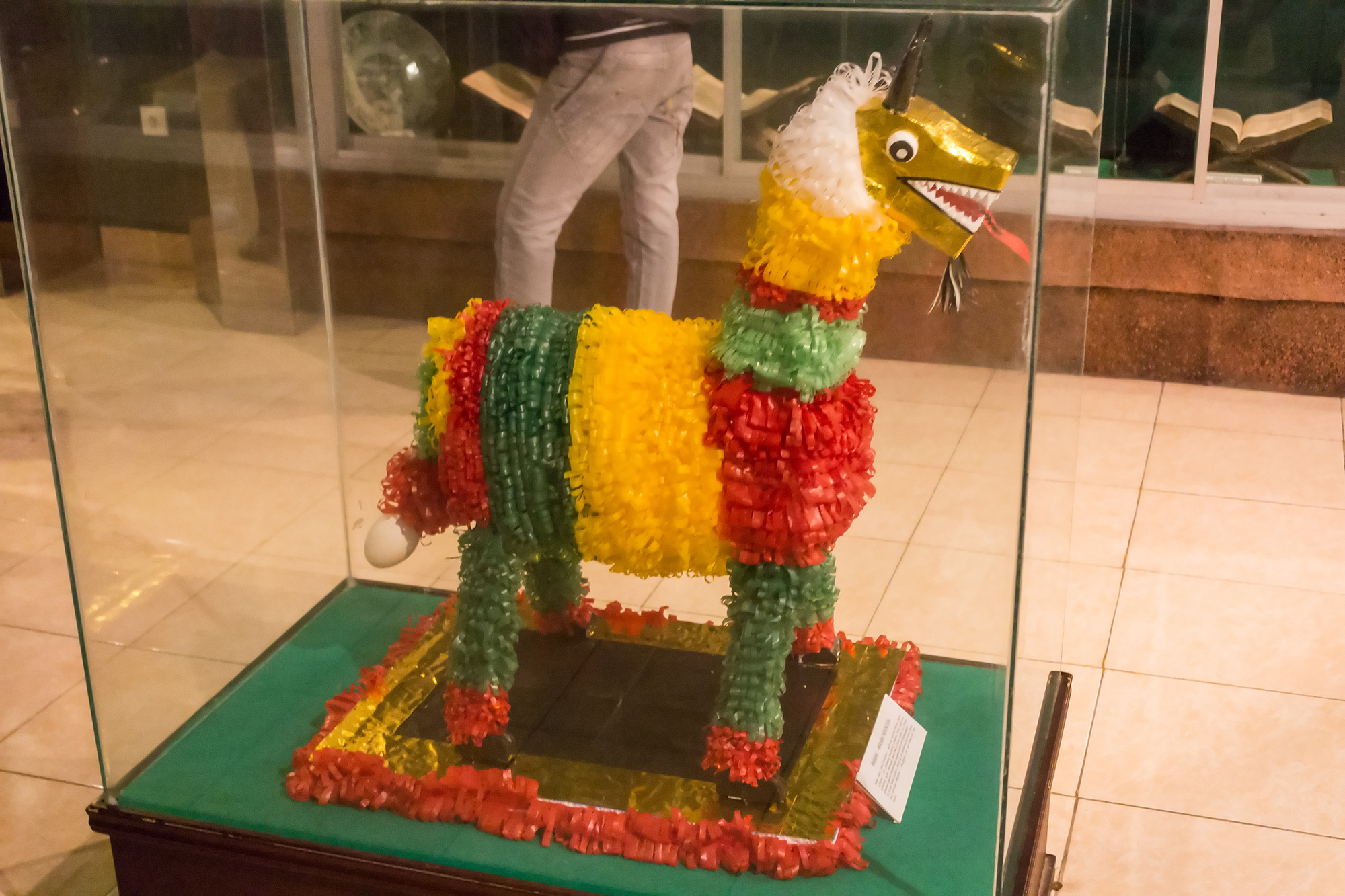
A warak ngendog figure, in the collection of the Great Mosque of Central Java

Warak ngendog (egg laying bird) is a mythical creature resembling a rhinoceros carrying eggs on its back. This creature, celebrated during the Dugderan Festival held annually on September 23 a few days before the holiday of Ramadan, is believed to represent three different ethnic groups in Semarang: Javanese, Chinese and Arabian. Its head is like a dragon (Chinese), its body is the combination of buraq (a special animal resembling the winged horse with a human head believed to take Muhammad to Sidratul Muntaha; Arab) and goat (Javanese).

Warak Ngendog is a children's toy that was once very popular in the city of Semarang and its surroundings, and is usually sold during the Dugderan Festival, a folk festival in Semarang held to welcome the coming of Ramadan.

The Dugderan celebration itself is a public market that is held at the Johar Market every Sya'ban month in the Islamic calendar. This celebration is held once a year to welcome the arrival of the Holy Month of Ramadan. The Dugderan celebration will be filled with people's market activities in the heart of Semarang City, precisely in Johar Market. Dugderan usually lasts for a week before entering the month of Ramadan. The highlight of Dugderan itself is the street festival where Warak Ngendog is paraded along the Semarang city area. The day before Ramadan arrives, the top of the Dugderan Festival will be held. There will be a carnival which will be attended by red and white troops, drumband, warak ngendhog, residents who wear traditional clothes, cannons, and various other arts from Semarang.

The creature is described to be part giraffe, part lion, part Chinese dragon, part horse, and part bird and is made into popular toys for children to play with during the festival.
