= Taufik Hidayat (footballer, born 1993) =

Indonesian footballer

Personal information
- Full name: Muhammad Taufik Hidayat
- Date of birth: 20 March 1993 (age 33)
- Place of birth: Demak, Indonesia
- Height: 1.67 m (5 ft 6 in)
- Position: Left-back

Team information
- Current team: Madura United
- Number: 45

Youth career
- 2011–2012: Persib U21
- 2012–2013: PS Beltim U21

Senior career*
Years	Team	Apps	(Gls)
2014–2017	PSIS Semarang	45	(5)
2018–2019	Bali United	17	(0)
2019–2020	PSM Makassar	21	(0)
2020–2021	Arema	2	(0)
2021	PSIM Yogyakarta	10	(0)
2022–2023	PSIS Semarang	31	(0)
2023–2024	RANS Nusantara	31	(0)
2024–	Madura United	52	(1)
- * Club domestic league appearances and goals as of 6 September 2026

Muhammad Taufik Hidayat (born 20 March 1993) is an Indonesian professional footballer who plays as a left-back for Super League club Madura United.

== Club career ==
=== PSIS Semarang ===
First professional club of Taufik Hidayat was PSIS Semarang. Since the first year, Taufik was often being the first choice of coach. In the "Sepak Bola Gajah" scandal in 2014, Taufik received a five-year ban on playing in the league and fined Rp 50 million. But then in 2017 through Letter Number 009/Kep/PK-PSSI/I/2017 dated 10 January 2017, status of Taufik together with 9 players and three officials restored by PSSI.

=== Bali United ===
On 17 December 2017, he signed a year contract with Liga 1 club Bali United. Taufik made his league debut on 3 June 2018 in a match against Madura United at the Gelora Bangkalan Stadium, Bangkalan.

=== PSM Makassar ===
On 13 January 2019, he signed contract with Liga 1 club PSM Makassar. Taufik made his league debut on 24 May 2019 in a match against Badak Lampung at the Andi Mattalatta Stadium, Makassar.

=== Arema F.C. ===
Taufik in 2020 signed for Arema to play in the 2020 Liga 1 (Indonesia) season. He made his league debut on 2 March 2020 in a match against TIRA-Persikabo at the Pakansari Stadium, Cibinong. This season was suspended on 27 March 2020 due to the COVID-19 pandemic. The season was abandoned and was declared void on 20 January 2021.

=== PSIM Yogyakarta ===
In 2021, Taufik Hidayat signed a contract with Indonesian Liga 2 club PSIM Yogyakarta. He made his league debut on 26 September in a 1–0 loss against PSCS Cilacap at the Manahan Stadium, Surakarta.

=== Return to PSIS Semarang ===
In 2022, Taufik Hidayat is back in PSIS Semarang uniform. The player from Sayung, Demak will wear the PSIS uniform in the second round of Liga 1 after yesterday strengthening PSIM Yogyakarta in the Liga 2 competition until the semifinals. Taufik made his league debut on 6 January 2022 in a match against Persija Jakarta at the Kapten I Wayan Dipta Stadium, Gianyar.

== Honours ==
=== Club ===
PSIS Semarang

- Liga 2 third place (play-offs): 2017

PSM Makassar

- Piala Indonesia: 2018–19
