= Fauzan Fajri =

Indonesian association football player

Personal information
- Full name: Fauzan Fajri Nasrullah
- Date of birth: 18 May 1989 (age 37)
- Place of birth: Semarang, Indonesia
- Height: 1.86 m (6 ft 1 in)
- Position: Centre-back

Senior career*
Years	Team	Apps	(Gls)
2011–2012	Persibangga Purbalingga	0	(0)
2012–2016	PSIS Semarang	50	(5)
2017	Persibangga Purbalingga	9	(1)
2017	Kalteng Putra	7	(0)
2018–2020	PSIS Semarang	15	(0)
2020	Mitra Kukar	0	(0)
2021	Muba Babel United	0	(0)
2021–2022	Dewa United	7	(0)
2022–2023	PSIM Yogyakarta	8	(0)
2023–2024	Persibangga Purbalingga	13	(0)
- * Club domestic league appearances and goals as of 30 December 2021

Fauzan Fajri Nasrullah (born 18 May 1989), is an Indonesian professional footballer who plays as a centre-back.

== Club career ==
=== PSIS Semarang ===
In the 2012 season, Fauzan joined PSIS Semarang. In the 2014 season, Fauzan reunited with some of his colleagues in the Central Java soccer team for PON XVIII. Among them, Hari Nur Yulianto, Saptono, Vidi Hasiholan, Eli Nasokha, and Ivo Andre Wibowo. Since the season of 2014 Fauzan Fajri was trusted to be the team captain PSIS Semarang. Fauzan Fajri spent 5 seasons with PSIS Semarang since joining PSIS Semarang in 2012. Fauzan was marginalized from the PSIS squad at Indonesia Championship 2016 due to a knee injury he suffered for over a year.

=== Mitra Kukar ===
He was signed for Mitra Kukar to play in Liga 2 in the 2020 season. This season was suspended on 27 March 2020 due to the COVID-19 pandemic. The season was abandoned and was declared void on 20 January 2021.

=== Muba Babel United ===
In 2021, Fauzan Fajri signed with Indonesian Liga 2 club Muba Babel United.

=== Dewa United ===
In 2021, Fajri signed a contract with Indonesian Liga 2 club Dewa United. He made first 2021–22 Liga 2 debut on 18 October 2021, coming on as a starter in a 2–0 win against PSKC Cimahi at the Gelora Bung Karno Madya Stadium, Jakarta.

=== PSIM Yogyakarta ===
Fauzan was signed for PSIM Yogyakarta to play in Liga 2 on 2022 season.

== Honours ==
=== Club ===
Dewa United

- Liga 2 third place (play-offs): 2021
