= Robert Elopere =

Indonesian footballer

Personal information
- Full name: Hobert Robert Elopere
- Date of birth: 1 March 1990 (age 36)
- Place of birth: Wamena, Indonesia
- Height: 1.75 m (5 ft 9 in)
- Position: Defender

Youth career
- 2006–2008: Persiwa Junior
- 2008–2011: Persiwa U-21

Senior career*
Years	Team	Apps	(Gls)
2010–2017	Persiwa Wamena	82	(5)
2018	PSMS Medan	0	(0)
2018	Persiwa Wamena	29	(0)
- * Club domestic league appearances and goals

Robert Elopere (born on March 1, 1990) is an Indonesian former footballer.
