= Safrudin Tahar =

Indonesian footballer

Personal information
- Full name: Safrudin Tahar
- Date of birth: 13 December 1993 (age 32)
- Place of birth: Ternate, Indonesia
- Height: 1.72 m (5 ft 8 in)
- Position: Defender

Team information
- Current team: Semen Padang
- Number: 27

Youth career
- 2009: Persija Jakarta

Senior career*
Years	Team	Apps	(Gls)
2011–2012	PSMS Medan	32	(2)
2013–2014	PSM Makassar	22	(0)
2014–2021	PSIS Semarang	119	(4)
2021–2022	Borneo Samarinda	17	(0)
2022–2024	PSM Makassar	50	(1)
2024–2026	Malut United	61	(0)
2026–	Semen Padang	1	(0)

International career
2012	Indonesia U23	3	(0)
- * Club domestic league appearances and goals as of 13 September 2026

Safrudin Tahar (born 13 December 1993) is an Indonesian professional footballer, who plays as a defender for Championship club Semen Padang.

== Club career ==
=== PSIS Semarang ===
After he failed his trial on Persik Kediri, Safrudin Tahar chose PSIS Semarang as his team. He played 23 times and scored 1 goal in his first season, bringing PSIS Semarang to a quarter-final, but PSIS Semarang did not qualify to the next stage because of match fixing scandal. But Tahar escaped sanctions, so his contract was extended by PSIS Semarang. In 2017, Tahar helped the club win third-place of Liga 2 after winning 6–4 over Martapura in December 2017 and was automatically promoted to Liga 1.

=== Borneo F.C. Samarinda ===
In 2021, Safrudin Tahar signed a contract with Indonesian Liga 1 club Borneo Samarinda. He made his debut on 10 September 2021 in a match against Persik Kediri.

=== PSM Makassar ===
Safrudin was signed for PSM Makassar to play in Liga 1 in the 2022–23 season. He made his league debut on 29 August 2022 in a match against Persib Bandung at the Gelora B.J. Habibie Stadium, Parepare.

== International career ==
Tahar called up Indonesia U-22 for 2013 AFC U-22 Championship qualification.

== Honours ==
=== Club ===
PSIS Semarang

- Liga 2 third place (play-offs): 2017

PSM Makassar

- Liga 1: 2022–23
