= Julio Alcorsé =

Argentine footballer (born 1981)

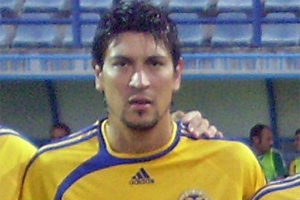

Personal information
- Full name: Julio César Alcorsé
- Date of birth: September 17, 1981 (age 45)
- Place of birth: Santa Fe, Argentina
- Height: 1.91 m (6 ft 3 in)
- Position: Striker

Senior career*
Years	Team	Apps	(Gls)
1998–1999	Entella Chiavari	15	(9)
2000–2001	Boca Juniors	1	(0)
2001–2002	FC Luzern	15	(6)
2002–2003	Almirante Brown	8	(1)
2003–2004	Deportivo Morón	8	(1)
2004–2005	Unión La Calera	8	(2)
2005–2006	Sportivo Belgrano	17	(12)
2006–2007	Deportivo Roca	7	(3)
2007–2009	Hibernians	14	(3)
2008	→Marsaxlokk (loan)	14	(10)
2008–2009	→Marsaxlokk (loan)	20	(17)
2009	Guaraní	4	(0)
2009–2010	Sliema Wanderers	15	(5)
2010–2011	Marsaxlokk	14	(6)
2011–2012	PSMS Medan	15	(7)
2012–2013	Persibo Bojonegoro	8	(3)
2013–2014	Persijap Jepara	12	(6)
2014–2015	PSIS Semarang	17	(13)
2015–2016	Sliema Wanderers F.C.		
- * Club domestic league appearances and goals as of 3 December 2014

Julio César Alcorsé (born September 17, 1981, in Santa Fe, Argentina) is an Argentine former professional footballer who plays as a striker.

== Playing career ==
He started his career when he was only 16 years old in Entella Chiavari Club (Italy). In the year 2000 he joined Boca Juniors, starting in the second team and after scoring 15 goals in only 12 games he joined the first team with Carlos Bianchi as coach. He played 3 games and then he joined a Swiss Club: F.C Luzern (2001–2002) scoring 6 goals in 14 games. Almirante Brown (Arrecifes), Deportivo Moron, Union La Calera (Chile) and Sportivo Belgrano Cordoba in Argentina were the clubs where he played too. In 2007, he joined a Maltese club, Hibernians FC. He won the Maltese Super Cup, played the UEFA Cup Classification in Serbia and scored 2 goals in 10 games. After 6 months he moved on loan to another Maltese club, Marsaxlokk FC. He played in this club until 2011 (with a 2 times - 6 months - break that he joined Guarani FC in Paraguay and Sliema Wanderers in Malta as well) playing 45 games and scoring 37 goals. In 2011 Indonesia was his new destination: PSM Medan first - IPL League - until 2012 and then in 2013 Persibo Bojonegoro (first round). AFC cup was another International Cup that Julio played (3 games- 2 goals.) In the second round he played for Persijap Jepara - IPL League - playing 8 games and scored 6 goals.

In March 2014 he joined PSIS Semarang, he played 17 games and scored 13 goals.

== Personal life ==
Julio is married to Julieta Zerillo, and the couple have one daughter called Catalina Alcorse.
