= Ronald Fagundez =

Uruguayan footballer (born 1979)

Personal information
- Full name: Ronald Daian Fagundez Olivera
- Date of birth: May 12, 1979 (age 47)
- Place of birth: Montevideo, Uruguay
- Height: 1.82 m (5 ft 11 1/2 in)
- Position: Midfielder

Team information
- Current team: PSM Makassar (assistant)

Senior career*
Years	Team	Apps	(Gls)
1999–2003	Huracán Buceo	40	(8)
2003–2006	PSM Makassar	72	(14)
2006–2009	Persik Kediri	73	(25)
2009–2012	Persisam Putra Samarinda	67	(8)
2013–2014	PSIS Semarang	50	(17)

Managerial career
- 2022–: PSM Makassar (assistant)
- * Club domestic league appearances and goals

Ronald Daian Fagundez Olivera (born May 12, 1979) is a Uruguayan-born Indonesian former professional footballer who is currently the assistant coach of Liga 1 club PSM Makassar.
