= Firman Septian =

Indonesian footballer

Personal information
- Full name: Firman Septian
- Date of birth: 23 September 1988 (age 38)
- Place of birth: Jakarta, Indonesia
- Height: 1.73 m (5 ft 8 in)
- Positions: Forward; winger

Team information
- Current team: Wahana
- Number: 21

Youth career
- 2008–2009: Persija Jakarta

Senior career*
Years	Team	Apps	(Gls)
2010–2013	Persitara Jakarta Utara	35	(5)
2014–2018	PSPS Riau	78	(31)
2018–2019	Semen Padang	7	(0)
2019	PSPS Riau	11	(7)
2020	Sriwijaya	1	(0)
2021	PSIM Yogyakarta	6	(0)
2022	Pekanbaru Warriors	3	(1)
2023–2024	PSPS Riau	10	(2)
2025–	Wahana	12	(10)
- * Club domestic league appearances and goals as of 21 April 2025

Firman Septian (born 23 September 1988) is an Indonesian professional footballer who plays as a winger for Liga 4 club Wahana.

== Club career ==
=== Sriwijaya ===
He was signed for Sriwijaya to play in Liga 2 in the 2020 season. This season was suspended on 27 March 2020 due to the COVID-19 pandemic. The season was abandoned and was declared void on 20 January 2021.

=== PSIM Yogyakarta ===
In 2021, Firman signed a contract with Indonesian Liga 2 club PSIM Yogyakarta. He made his league debut on 26 September in a 1–0 loss against PSCS Cilacap at the Manahan Stadium, Surakarta.

== Honours ==
=== Club ===
Semen Padang

- Liga 2 runner-up: 2018

Wahana FC

- Liga 4 Riau: 2024–25
