= 2018 Liga 2 (Indonesia) =

Indonesian football season

Liga 2
- Season: 2018
- Dates: 23 April – 4 December 2018
- Champions: PSS (1st title)
- Promoted: PSS; Semen Padang; Kalteng Putra
- Relegated: Persegres; Persik Kendal; Persika; Persiwa; PSIR; Semeru
- Matches: 293 (Note: Excluding match between Persiwa vs PSIM (goals also not counted).)
- Goals: 761 (2.6 per match)
- Best player: Ichsan Pratama
- Top goalscorer: Indra Setiawan (29 goals)
- Biggest home win: Persiraja 7–0 Perserang (14 July 2018)
- Biggest away win: Persik Kendal 0–3 Semen Padang (3 July 2018); Semeru 0–3 Madura (5 July 2018)
- Highest scoring: Martapura 3–4 Persiwa (25 April 2018); Persiraja 7–0 Perserang (14 July 2018); PSBS 5–2 Persiba (15 July 2018); Persiraja 6–1 Aceh United (8 October 2018)
- Longest winning run: 7 games Semen Padang
- Longest unbeaten run: 10 games PSIM
- Longest winless run: 12 games Persiwa
- Longest losing run: 6 games Persiwa

The 2018 Liga 2 was the second season of the Liga 2 under its current name, and the ninth season under its current league structure.

PSS won the title after a 2–0 win over Semen Padang in the final at Pakansari Stadium, Cibinong on 4 December 2018.

== Overview ==
=== Player regulations ===
Clubs could register at least 18 players and a maximum of 30 players without age restriction like the previous season, but maximum 3 players over the age of 35 years. Like the previous season, the clubs also couldn't use foreign players.

== Teams ==
=== Teams changes ===
The following teams have changed division since the 2017 season.

==== To Liga 2 ====
Relegated from Liga 1

- Persegres
- Persiba
- Semen Padang

Promoted from Liga 3

- Blitar United
- Persik Kendal
- Aceh United

==== From Liga 2 ====
Promoted to Liga 1

- Persebaya
- PSMS
- PSIS

Relegated to Liga 3

- 757 Kepri Jaya
- PSBL
- Persih
- Pro Duta
- Persikad
- PS Bengkulu
- Lampung Sakti
- Persikabo
- Persibas
- Persip
- Persijap
- Persibangga
- Sragen United
- PPSM
- Persipon
- Persiba Bantul
- Persatu
- Persinga
- Madiun Putra
- PSBI
- Persewangi
- Perssu
- Persida
- PS Badung
- PS West Sumbawa
- Persekap
- Persigubin
- Persbul
- Persifa
- Celebest
- PS Timah Babel
- Persepam
- Yahukimo
- Perseka
- PSCS
- Persipur
- PSBK
- Persik
- PSGC
- Persekam Metro

=== Stadium and locations ===
Locations of the 2018 Liga 2 teams (Red: West Region, Blue: East Region)

Team	Location	Stadium	Capacity
Aceh United	Banda Aceh	Harapan Bangsa	45,000
Aceh United	Bireuën	Cot Gapu (Note: Aceh United plays at Cot Gapu starting from week 16.)	15,000
Blitar United	Blitar	Gelora Supriyadi	15,000
Cilegon United	Cilegon	Krakatau Steel	25,000
Kalteng Putra	Palangka Raya	Tuah Pahoe	5,000
Madura	Sumenep	Ahmad Yani	15,000
Martapura	Martapura	Demang Lehman	15,000
Persegres	Gresik	Gelora Joko Samudro	25,000
Perserang	Serang	Maulana Yusuf	15,000
Persiba	Balikpapan	Batakan	40,000
Persibat	Batang	Moh Sarengat	15,000
Persik Kendal	Kendal	Kebondalem	10,000
Persika	Karawang	Singaperbangsa	25,000
Persiraja	Banda Aceh	H. Dimurthala	20,000
Persis	Solo	Manahan	25,000
Persis	Madiun	Wilis (Note: Persis plays at Wilis due to the renovation of their stadium at Manahan.)	25,000
Persita	Karawang	Singaperbangsa (Note: Persita played their first seven home games at Singaperbangsa until Benteng Taruna was finished.)	25,000
Persita	Tangerang	Benteng Taruna	30,000
Persiwa	Kuningan	Mashud Wisnusaputra	10,000
Persiwa	Cirebon	Bima	15,000
Persiwa	Depok	Heri Sudrajat	5,000
PSBS	Biak	Cendrawasih	15,000
PSIM	Yogyakarta	Sultan Agung (Note: PSIM plays at Sultan Agung due to the renovation of their stadium at Mandala Krida.)	35,000
PSIR	Rembang	Krida	10,000
PSMP	Mojokerto	Gajahmada Mojosari	10,000
PSPS Riau	Pekanbaru	Kaharudin Nasution	30,000
PSS	Sleman	Maguwoharjo	31,700
Semen Padang	Padang	Haji Agus Salim	15,000
Semeru	Lumajang	Semeru	3,000

=== Personnel and kits ===
Note: Flags indicate national team as has been defined under FIFA eligibility rules. Players and coaches may hold more than one non-FIFA nationality.

Team	Head coach	Captain	Kit manufacturer	Shirt Sponsor(s)
Aceh United	(Indonesia) Bonggo Pribadi	(Indonesia) Feri Komul	Calci	Bank Aceh^{1}, The Light of Aceh^{1}
Blitar United	Vacant	(Indonesia) Eka Hera	Kelme	
Cilegon United	(Indonesia) Sasi Kirono	(Indonesia) Rinto Ali	Kelme	Krakatau Steel^{1}, PT. Cilegon Putra Mandala^{1}
Kalteng Putra	(Indonesia) Kas Hartadi	(Indonesia) Dadang Apridianto	MBB	Halo Dayak^{1}, Bank Kalteng^{1}, Barito Pacific^{1}, Dwima Group^{1}, Wilmar^{2}
Madura	(Indonesia) Salahudin	(Indonesia) Beny Ashar	Kelme	BPR El Baghraf^{1}
Martapura	(Indonesia) Frans Sinatra Huwae	(Indonesia) Qischil Minny	Kelme	Jhonlin Group^{1}, Banjarmasin Post^{1}, Haji Maming^{2}
Persegres	(Indonesia) Sanusi Rahman	(Indonesia) Dedi Indra	Twinstore	
Perserang	(Indonesia) Bambang Nurdiansyah	(Indonesia) Rastiawan Aribowo	Kelme	
Persiba	(Indonesia) Haryadi	(Indonesia) Bryan Cesar	RIORS	Anugerah Group Balikpapan^{1}, Cahaya Indonesia Wisata^{3}
Persibat	(Indonesia) Daniel Roekito	(Indonesia) Arif Budiono	RIORS	Negeri Phonsel^{1}, Kospin Sekartama^{1}
Persik Kendal	(Indonesia) Ricky Nelson	(Indonesia) Alaik Sabrina	Kelme	Sinar Mas Group^{1}, Dewi Ratih Putera Beton^{2}, Tribun Jateng^{2}, Kendal Industrial Park^{3}
Persika	(Indonesia) Herry Kiswanto	(Indonesia) Aang Suparman	MBB	Paytren^{1}, Pupuk Kujang^{1}, Peruri^{1}, Yamaha^{3}, Bank BJB^{3}, Aqudo^{3}
Persiraja	(Indonesia) Akhyar Ilyas	(Indonesia) Muklis Nakata	Kelme	PDAM Tirta Daroy^{1}
Persis	(Indonesia) Agus Yuwono	(Indonesia) Galih Sudaryono	Saestu	Torabika^{1}, Bukalapak^{1}, BNI^{1}, Syahdana Properti Nusantara^{1}, Syahdhana Energi^{1}, Saestu Manunggal Nusantara^{1}, PLN^{2}, Corsa^{2}, Kalimasadha Nusantara^{3}
Persita	(Indonesia) Wiganda Saputra	(Indonesia) Egi Melgiansyah	RIORS	
Persiwa	(Indonesia) Suimin Diharja	(Indonesia) Saktiawan Sinaga	Calsie	
PSBS	(Indonesia) Slamet Riyadi	(Indonesia) Toumahuw Yacob	talas	Bank Papua^{1}
PSIM	(Indonesia) Bona Simanjuntak	(Indonesia) Hendika Arga	Kelme	ReneSola^{1}, Jogja Istimewa^{1}, Gudegnet^{3}
PSIR	(Indonesia) Uston Nawawi	(Indonesia) Denny Rumba	Print Sport	Semen Gresik^{1}
PSMP	(Indonesia) Jamal Yastro	(Indonesia) Indra Setiawan	Print Sport	
PSPS Riau	(Indonesia) Hendri Susilo	(Indonesia) Ponda Dwi Saputra	Kelme	Corsa^{1}, Bank Riau Kepri^{1}, Frozen^{1}, Oxygen^{1}, FAT^{1}, Pemuda Pancasila Provinsi Riau^{3}, Grand Elite Hotel Pekanbaru^{3}
PSS	(Indonesia) Seto Nurdiantoro	(Indonesia) Achmad Hisyam	Sembada	Corsa^{1}, Torabika^{1}, Indomie^{1}, Go-Jek^{1}, Muncul^{3}
Semen Padang	(Indonesia) Syafrianto Rusli	(Indonesia) Hengky Ardiles	MBB	Oxygen^{1}, Semen Padang (Semen Indonesia Group)^{1}, Torabika^{1}, Corsa^{1}, Paytren^{1}, Citilink^{2}, AYIA^{3}
Semeru	(Indonesia) Putut Wijanarko	(Indonesia) Reza Mustofa	Kelme	Manda Group^{1}, Nogosari Leather^{1}, Radar Semeru^{1}, Radar Jember^{2}, Tabloid Bola^{3}, Beritajatim.com^{3}

Notes:

1. On the front of shirt.
2. On the back of shirt.
3. On the sleeves.
4. On the shorts.

=== Coaching changes ===
Team	Outgoing coach	Manner of departure	Date of vacancy	Position in table	Incoming coach	Date of appointment
Persita	(Indonesia) Bambang Nurdiansyah	End of contract	12 October 2017	Pre-season	(Indonesia) Elly Idris	27 December 2017
PSBS	(Indonesia) Frengky Samay	End of contract	13 October 2017	Pre-season	(Indonesia) M. Jaelani Saputra	February 2018
Persiwa	(Indonesia) Djoko Susilo	End of contract	13 October 2017	Pre-season	(Indonesia) Suimin Diharja	13 April 2018
PSS	(Indonesia) Freddy Muli	Signed by Persis	16 October 2017	Pre-season	(Indonesia) Herry Kiswanto	1 December 2017
Persegres	(Indonesia) Hanafi	End of contract	12 November 2017	Pre-season	(Indonesia) Puji Handoko	19 April 2018
Persiba	(Indonesia) Haryadi	Demoted to assistant coach	12 November 2017	Pre-season	(Brazil) Wanderley da Silva	13 December 2017
PSPS Riau	(Indonesia) Philep Hansen Maramis	End of contract	21 November 2017	Pre-season	(Indonesia) Jafri Sastra	15 December 2017
Persika	(Indonesia) Suimin Diharja	End of contract	24 November 2017	Pre-season	(Indonesia) Ricky Nelson	11 December 2017
Martapura	(Indonesia) Frans Sinatra Huawe	End of contract	28 November 2017	Pre-season	(Indonesia) Hartono Ruslan	22 February 2018
Aceh United	(Indonesia) Ansyari Lubis	End of contract	28 December 2017	Pre-season	(Chile) Simón Elissetche	28 December 2017
PSMP	(Indonesia) Redi Supriyanto	Demoted to assistant coach	2 January 2018	Pre-season	(Indonesia) Jamal Yastro	2 January 2018
Blitar United	(Indonesia) Gatot Mulbajadi	Mutual termination	12 January 2018	Pre-season	(Indonesia) Suimin Diharja	2 March 2018
Persik Kendal	(Indonesia) Ahmad Yasin	Demoted to assistant coach	24 January 2018	Pre-season	(Indonesia) Eduard Tjong	24 January 2018
PSPS Riau	(Indonesia) Jafri Sastra	Mutual termination	4 February 2018	Pre-season	(Indonesia) Ansyari Lubis	8 February 2018
Persis	(Indonesia) Freddy Muli	Resigned	23 February 2018	Pre-season	(Indonesia) Jafri Sastra	14 March 2018
PSPS Riau	(Indonesia) Ansyari Lubis	Resigned	4 March 2018	Pre-season	(Indonesia) Hendri Susilo	20 March 2018
Blitar United	(Indonesia) Suimin Diharja	Mutual termination	11 April 2018	Pre-season	(Indonesia) Bonggo Pribadi	12 April 2018
PSIM	(Indonesia) Erwan Hendarwanto	Became team's manager	30 April 2018	12th in East Region	(Indonesia) Bona Simanjuntak	30 April 2018
PSS	(Indonesia) Herry Kiswanto	Resigned	6 May 2018	5th in East Region	(Indonesia) Seto Nurdiantoro	24 May 2018
Perserang	(Indonesia) Zainal Abidin Zapello	Sacked	22 June 2018	10th in West Region	(Indonesia) Bambang Nurdiansyah	22 June 2018
PSBS	(Indonesia) M. Jaelani Saputra	Sacked	3 July 2018	11th in East Region	(Indonesia) Slamet Riyadi	3 July 2018
Persiba	(Brazil) Wanderley da Silva	Resigned	5 July 2018	9th in East Region	(Indonesia) Haryadi	5 July 2018
Martapura	(Indonesia) Hartono Ruslan	Sacked	12 July 2018	6th in East Region	(Indonesia) Frans Sinatra Huawe	12 July 2018
Persita	(Indonesia) Elly Idris	Sacked	15 July 2018	11th in West Region	(Indonesia) Wiganda Saputra	15 July 2018
Persika	(Indonesia) Ricky Nelson	Resigned	16 July 2018	8th in West Region	(Indonesia) Herry Kiswanto	25 July 2018
Persegres	(Indonesia) Puji Handoko	Resigned	21 July 2018	11th in East Region	(Indonesia) Sanusi Rahman	21 July 2018
Persik Kendal	(Indonesia) Eduard Tjong	Resigned	25 July 2018	12th in West Region	(Indonesia) Ricky Nelson	29 July 2018
Persis	(Indonesia) Jafri Sastra	Sacked	14 August 2018	2nd in West Region	(Indonesia) Agus Yuwono	15 August 2018
Cilegon United	(Indonesia) Imam Riyadi	Resigned	4 September 2018	10th in West Region	(Indonesia) Sasi Kirono	11 September 2018
Blitar United	(Indonesia) Bonggo Pribadi	Loaned by Aceh United	19 October 2018	7th in East Region		
Aceh United	(Chile) Simón Elissetche	Sacked	19 October 2018	3rd in West Region	(Indonesia) Bonggo Pribadi	19 October 2018

== First round ==
=== West region ===
Pos	Team	Pld	W	D	L	GF	GA	GD	Pts	Qualification or relegation
1	Semen Padang (P)	22	12	3	7	29	22	+7	39	Advance to the second round
2	Persiraja	22	10	5	7	43	28	+15	35 (Note: Head-to-head points: Persiraja (+5) 11 pts; Aceh United (–2) 10 pts; Persita (–1) 7 pts; Persis (–2) 5 pts)	Advance to the second round
3	Aceh United	22	10	5	7	29	30	−1	35	Advance to the second round
4	Persita	22	10	5	7	32	22	+10	35	Advance to the second round
5	Persis	22	10	5	7	25	16	+9	35	
6	PSPS Riau	22	8	7	7	30	38	−8	31 (Note: Head-to-head results: PSPS Riau 2–1 Perserang, Perserang 3–2 PSPS Riau)	
7	Perserang	22	8	7	7	23	29	−6	31	
8	Cilegon United	22	8	5	9	27	25	+2	29	
9	Persibat	22	8	4	10	22	28	−6	28	
10	Persika (R)	22	6	6	10	23	33	−10	24	Relegation to Liga 3
11	PSIR (R)	22	6	4	12	24	30	−6	22 (Note: Head-to-head results: PSIR 1–0 Persik Kendal, Persik Kendal 1–1 PSIR)	Relegation to Liga 3
12	Persik Kendal (R)	22	6	4	12	18	24	−6	22	Relegation to Liga 3

Source: Babak Penyisihan Liga 2
Rules for classification: 1) Points; 2) Head-to-head; 3) Goal difference; 4) Goals scored; 5) Drawing.
(P) Promoted; (R) Relegated
Notes:

Home \ Away	ACH	CLG	SER	BAT	KEN	KAR	RAJ	SOL	PTA	REM	RIA	SPD
Aceh United	—	1–0	0–0	2–0	2–1	3–1	0–0	2–1	2–0	2–2	2–2	4–1
Cilegon United	4–0	—	2–0	0–0	3–2	1–2	4–0	2–1	1–2	2–1	2–0	1–0
Perserang	1–0	1–1	—	1–1	2–1	2–2	3–1	1–0	1–2	1–0	3–2	1–0
Persibat	1–1	2–1	2–1	—	1–0	1–0	2–1	2–1	0–1	3–1	2–2	1–2
Persik Kendal	3–0	1–0	2–0	0–1	—	2–0	1–3	0–1	1–1	1–1	0–0	0–3
Persika	2–1	4–0	1–1	2–1	0–1	—	2–2	0–0	0–2	2–1	0–0	1–0
Persiraja	6–1	0–0	7–0	1–0	0–0	3–1	—	1–0	2–1	2–0	5–0	2–0
Persis	1–0	2–0	2–1	2–1	1–0	2–0	1–1	—	0–0	2–0	3–1	3–0
Persita	2–3	0–0	1–1	3–0	0–1	4–1	4–2	1–0	—	4–0	2–1	1–1
PSIR	0–1	1–1	0–1	1–0	1–0	3–1	1–0	1–1	2–0	—	6–0	1–2
PSPS Riau	1–2	2–1	2–1	3–1	2–1	1–1	4–2	1–1	2–1	1–0	—	2–1
Semen Padang	1–0	3–1	0–0	2–0	2–0	2–0	3–2	1–0	1–0	3–1	1–1	—

Source: Babak Penyisihan Liga 2
Legend: Blue = home team win; Yellow = draw; Red = away team win.
For upcoming matches, an "a" indicates there is an article about the rivalry between the two participants.

=== East region ===
Pos	Team	Pld	W	D	L	GF	GA	GD	Pts	Qualification or relegation
1	PSS (C, P)	22	14	1	7	37	15	+22	43	Advance to the second round
2	Kalteng Putra (P)	22	11	6	5	29	18	+11	39 (Note: Head-to-head results: Kalteng Putra 1–0 Madura, Madura 1–1 Kalteng Putra)	Advance to the second round
3	Madura	22	11	6	5	35	21	+14	39	Advance to the second round
4	PSMP	22	12	1	9	41	29	+12	37	Advance to the second round
5	Martapura	22	9	4	9	31	29	+2	31 (Note: Head-to-head points: Martapura (+1) 6 pts; PSIM (0) 6 pts; Blitar United (–1) 6 pts)	
6	PSIM (Note: PSIM were deducted nine points due to FIFA sanction.)	22	12	4	6	31	29	+2	31	
7	Blitar United	22	9	4	9	24	26	−2	31	
8	Persiba	22	8	3	11	36	34	+2	27	
9	PSBS	22	7	5	10	28	32	−4	26 (Note: Head-to-head results: PSBS 4–0 Persegres, Persegres 2–1 PSBS)	
10	Persegres (R)	22	7	5	10	23	40	−17	26	Relegation to Liga 3
11	Semeru (R)	22	6	1	15	17	40	−23	19	Relegation to Liga 3
12	Persiwa (Note: Persiwa were deducted six points due to FIFA sanction and three points from PSSI disciplinary committee on 3 October 2018.) (R)	22	4	4	14	21	40	−19	7	Relegation to Liga 3

Source: Babak Penyisihan Liga 2
Rules for classification: 1) Points; 2) Head-to-head; 3) Goal difference; 4) Goals scored; 5) Drawing.
(C) Champions; (P) Promoted; (R) Relegated
Notes:

Home \ Away	BLI	KTP	MAD	MTP	PGU	PBA	PWA	BIA	YOG	PMP	PSS	SEM
Blitar United	—	1–1	1–1	1–0	1–1	2–0	3–1	3–1	1–3	2–1	1–0	1–2
Kalteng Putra	2–0	—	1–0	3–0	2–0	2–2	2–0	1–1	3–0	2–1	1–0	3–1
Madura	3–0	1–1	—	0–0	1–0	2–1	2–0	3–0	3–1	2–1	1–0	4–0
Martapura	2–1	0–0	4–2	—	2–1	1–1	3–4	1–0	3–0	4–2	3–0	1–0
Persegres	1–1	2–1	1–1	2–1	—	2–1	2–1	2–1	2–3	0–2	1–1	2–1
Persiba	0–2	2–0	1–1	2–1	6–0	—	3–0	3–1	1–2	3–2	1–4	3–0
Persiwa	0–1	1–3	1–1	1–0	1–1	2–1	—	0–0	0–3 (Note: PSIM was declared a walkover win over Persiwa because Persiwa organizing committee failed to obtain permission from the Cirebon City Police to hold a match.)	3–1	0–1	2–3
PSBS	2–1	0–0	1–0	1–2	4–0	5–2	3–2	—	0–0	3–0	0–2	2–0
PSIM	0–1	2–0	3–2	3–1	1–0	2–1	2–2	1–1	—	0–0	1–0	2–0
PSMP	2–0	3–0	3–0	4–2	2–0	2–0	2–0	2–1	4–1	—	2–1	3–0
PSS	2–0	1–0	1–2	1–0	5–1	1–0	1–0	3–0	4–0	3–1	—	5–0
Semeru	1–0	0–1	0–3	0–0	1–2	0–2	2–0	4–1	0–1	2–1	0–1	—

Source: Babak Penyisihan Liga 2
Legend: Blue = home team win; Yellow = draw; Red = away team win.
For upcoming matches, an "a" indicates there is an article about the rivalry between the two participants.

== Second round ==
This round began on 24 October 2018 and ended on 21 November 2018. Eight teams competed in this round.

=== Group A ===
Pos	Team	Pld	W	D	L	GF	GA	GD	Pts	Qualification	SPD	KTP	PMP	ACH
1	Semen Padang	6	3	1	2	12	11	+1	10 (Note: Head-to-head results: Kalteng Putra 1–0 Semen Padang, Semen Padang 3–1 Kalteng Putra)	Advance to the semi-finals	—	3–1	2–1	3–3
2	Kalteng Putra	6	3	1	2	8	7	+1	10	Advance to the semi-finals	1–0	—	1–0	2–0
3	PSMP	6	3	0	3	11	9	+2	9		3–1	2–1	—	3–1
4	Aceh United	6	1	2	3	11	15	−4	5		2–3	2–2	3–2	—

Source: Babak 8 Besar Liga 2
Legend: Blue = home team win; Yellow = draw; Red = away team win.
Rules for classification: 1) Points; 2) Head-to-head; 3) Goal difference; 4) Goals scored; 5) Drawing.

=== Group B ===
Pos	Team	Pld	W	D	L	GF	GA	GD	Pts	Qualification	PSS	PTA	RAJ	MAD
1	PSS	6	3	1	2	12	5	+7	10 (Note: Head-to-head results: Persita 1–1 PSS, PSS 4–1 Persita)	Advance to the semi-finals	—	4–1	5–0	1–0
2	Persita	6	3	1	2	8	10	−2	10	Advance to the semi-finals	1–1	—	1–0	3–2
3	Persiraja	6	3	0	3	7	9	−2	9		2–1	2–0	—	3–0
4	Madura	6	2	0	4	6	9	−3	6		1–0	1–2	2–0	—

Source: Babak 8 Besar Liga 2
Legend: Blue = home team win; Yellow = draw; Red = away team win.
Rules for classification: 1) Points; 2) Head-to-head; 3) Goal difference; 4) Goals scored; 5) Drawing.

== Knockout round ==
=== Bracket ===
Semi-finals
25/28 November
Persita	1	1	2
Semen Padang	0	3	3
25/28 November
Kalteng Putra	0	0	0
PSS	0	2	2

Final
4 December – Cibinong
Semen Padang	0
PSS	2
Third place
4 December – Cibinong
Persita	0
Kalteng Putra	2

=== Semi-finals ===
25 November 2018
15:30 UTC+7

Persita	1–0	Semen Padang
Ryan 22'	Report

Benteng Taruna Stadium, Tangerang
Referee: Yudi Nurcahya
28 November 2018
15:30 UTC+7

Semen Padang	3–1	Persita
Novriansyah 32'; Afriansyah 36'; Irsyad 60' (pen.)	Report	Ryan 30'

Haji Agus Salim Stadium, Padang
Referee: Dodi Setia Purnama

Semen Padang won 3–2 on aggregate.

25 November 2018
15:15 UTC+7

Kalteng Putra	0–0	PSS
	Report

Tuah Pahoe Stadium, Palangka Raya
Referee: Dwi Purba
28 November 2018
15:30 UTC+7

PSS	2–0	Kalteng Putra
Gonzáles 10', 54'	Report

Maguwoharjo Stadium, Sleman
Referee: Asep Yandis

PSS won 2–0 on aggregate.

=== Third place ===
4 December 2018
15:00 UTC+7

Persita	0–2	Kalteng Putra
	Report	Dendi 12'; Wirahadi 18'

Pakansari Stadium, Cibinong
Referee: Novari Ikhsan

=== Final ===
4 December 2018
18:30 UTC+7

Semen Padang	0–2	PSS
	Report	Gonzáles 18'; Lastori 27'

Pakansari Stadium, Cibinong
Referee: Dwi Purba

== Season statistics ==
=== Top scorers ===
Rank	Player	Club	Goals
1	(Indonesia) Indra Setiawan	PSMP	29
2	(Indonesia) Vivi Asrizal	Persiraja	15
2	(Indonesia) Cristian Gonzáles	PSS	15
4	(Indonesia) Kushedya Hari Yudo	Kalteng Putra	14
5	(Indonesia) Aldi Al Achya	Persita	13
6	(Indonesia) Firman Septian	Semen Padang/PSPS Riau	11

== See also ==
- 2018 Liga 1
- 2018 Liga 3
- 2018–19 Piala Indonesia
