= Jatidiri Stadium =

Stadium in Indonesia

- Location in the city of Semarang
- Location: Semarang, Central Java, Indonesia
- Coordinates: 7°01′34″S 110°24′34″E
- Owner: Central Java Provincial Government
- Capacity: 18,000 List: 20,000 (1991–2016) 25,000 (2021–2024) 18,000 (2024–)
- Surface: Zoysia matrella
- Field size: 110 by 64 metres (120 by 70 yd)
- Public transit: Corridor 6

Construction
- Opened: 1991
- Renovated: 2016–2022; 2023–2024
- Cost: IDR 1,1 trilion (renovation)

Tenants
- PSIS Semarang; Java United (2026–)

Jatidiri Stadium (Indonesian: Stadion Jatidiri) is a multi-use stadium in Semarang, Central Java, Indonesia. It is currently used mostly for football matches and is home stadium of PSIS Semarang. The stadium holds 18,000 people. In addition to a stadium, in this complex there is also a sports building, swimming pool, and other sports facilities.

== History ==
Jatidiri Stadium was built during the reign of Governor Muhammad Ismail and inaugurated in 1991. In 2016 the stadium renovation was started by the Central Java Provincial Government through Governor Ganjar Pranowo. The renovation of the stadium was completed at the end of 2021, the renovation consisted of drainage, fields, stands, roofs, and other supporting facilities which will later become an international class stadium. In December 2023 the renovation of the stadium started again with the cost of Rp23.5 billion. In August 2026, the stadium was chosen as the home base of Java United for the 2026–27 Super League season.

== Gallery ==
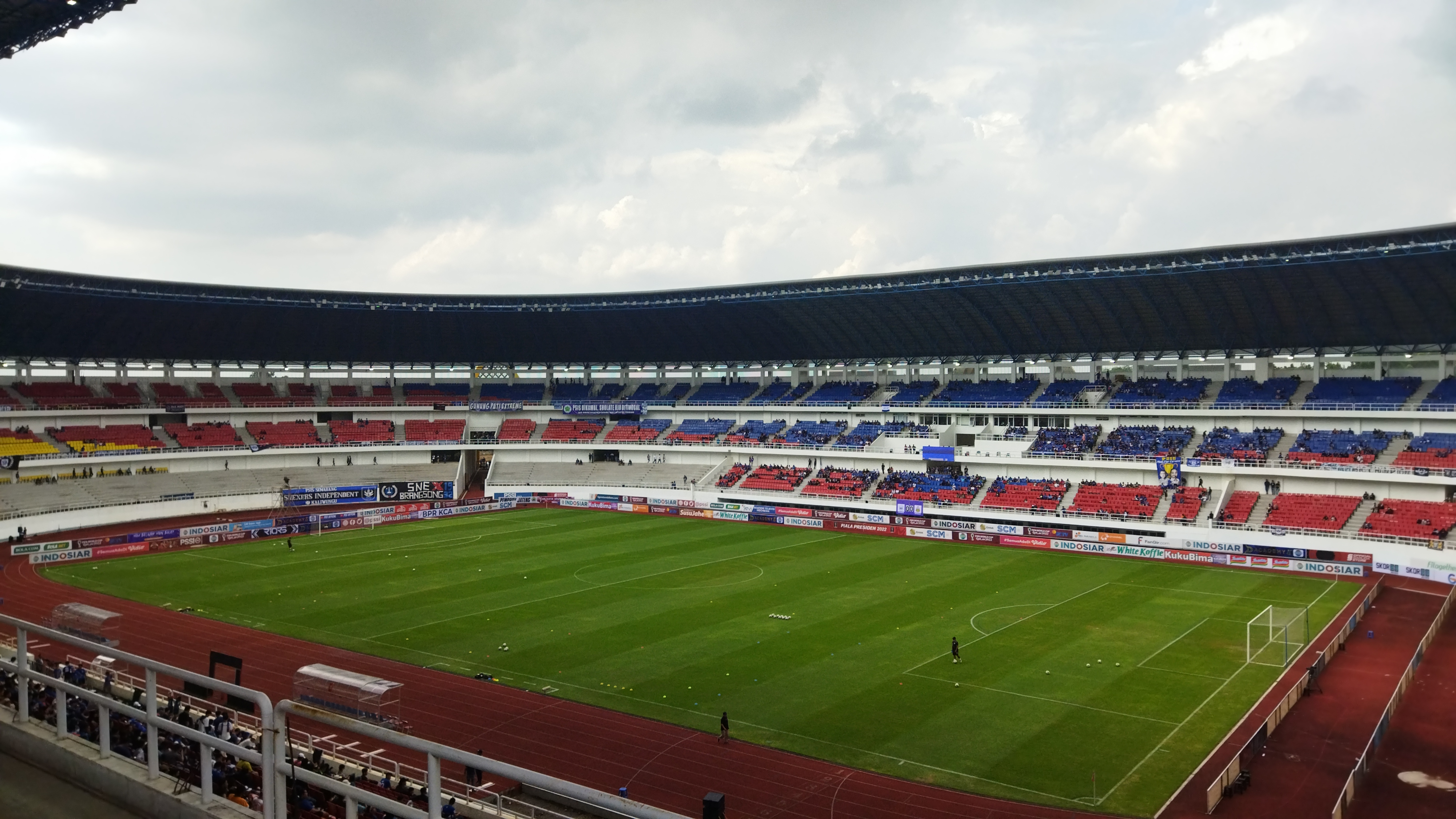
Jatidiri Stadium
