= Persibangga Purbalingga =

Indonesian football club

Persibangga
- Full name: Persatuan Sepakbola Indonesia Purbalingga
- Nicknames: Laskar Jenderal Soedirman; Jalak Suren
- Founded: 1950; 76 years ago
- Ground: Goentoer Darjono Stadium
- Capacity: 15,000
- Owner: PSSI Purbalingga Regency
- Chairman: Bambang Irawan
- Manager: Uut Triyas
- Coach: Mochammad Irfan
- League: Liga Nusantara
- 2025–26: Champions (Provincial phase); 3rd, Fourth round (National phase/promoted)
- Website: persibanggafc.com
Home colours	Away colours	Third colours

Persatuan Sepakbola Indonesia Purbalingga (simply known as Persibangga) is an Indonesian football club based in Purbalingga, Central Java. They set to compete in Liga Nusantara from 2026–27 season following their promotion from Liga 4 in 2025–26 season.

== History ==
Before being named Persibangga, this team was previously called Porip (Persatuan Olahraga Indonesia Purbalingga) which was founded in 1950. Three years later, precisely in 1953, Porip changed its name to Persap (Persatuan Sepakbola Antar Purbalingga).

Until then Persap won 2010–11 Liga Indonesia Second Division on 18 January 2011, at Lebak Bulus Stadium, Persap then changed its name to Persibangga. The name change was carried out at the PSSI Congress in Bali on 21–23 January 2011.

== Season-by-season records ==
Season(s)	League/Division	Tms.	Pos.	Piala Indonesia
2010–11	Second Division	78	1	–
2011–12	First Division	66	2	–
2013	Premier Division (LPIS)	21	6th, Group 2	–
2014	Premier Division	60	4th, Group 3	–
2015	Premier Division	season abandoned		–
2016	ISC B	53	7th, Group 3	–
2017	Liga 2	61	8th, Group 3	–
2018	Liga 3	32	Eliminated in National zone route	–
2019	Liga 3	32	Eliminated in Provincial round	–
2020	Liga 3	season abandoned		–
2021–22				
2022–23	Liga 3	season abandoned		–
2023–24	Liga 3	80	3rd, Second round	–
2024–25				
2025–26	Liga 4	64	3rd, Fourth round Group B (National)	–
2026–27	Liga Nusantara	24	TBD	–

== Supporter ==
Braling Mania is a supporter of the Persibangga Purbalingga team.

== Players ==
=== Current squad ===
As of November 2026

Note: Flags indicate national team as defined under FIFA eligibility rules; some limited exceptions apply. Players may hold more than one non-FIFA nationality.

No.	Pos.	Nation	Player
2	DF	IDN	Khoirul Amin
4	DF	IDN	Fathur Yan
6	DF	IDN	Yufrizal Abiyu
7	MF	IDN	Erlangga Adhyaksa
8	DF	IDN	Dhamar Lintang
11	MF	IDN	Alfandi
12	FW	IDN	Ardya Malik
14	DF	IDN	Rizky Wahyu
15	DF	IDN	Made Meiyana
16	DF	IDN	Azhril Syahdan
17	MF	IDN	Afif Teguh

No.	Pos.	Nation	Player
18	FW	IDN	Usama Ahmad
21	GK	IDN	Ichwan Sidiq
22	MF	IDN	Raja Naufal
25	DF	IDN	Ahmad Tuasalamony
28	GK	IDN	Novian Setya
30	MF	IDN	Theo Wicaksono
32	FW	IDN	Farrel Arya
44	DF	IDN	Restu Pratama
47	DF	IDN	Aliyyu Desta
76	GK	IDN	Husein Akbar
79	FW	IDN	Adithya Jorry Guruh
87	MF	IDN	Ilham Irhaz
91	FW	IDN	Fajar Akhmad

== Coaching staff ==
Position	Name
Head Coach	(Indonesia) Mochammad Irfan
Assistant Coach	(Indonesia) Fauzan Fajri
Goalkeeper Coach	(Indonesia) Riyadi
Physical Coach	(Indonesia) Sigit Pamungkas
Analyst	(Indonesia) Muji Rantono
Media Officer	(Indonesia) Rizqa Amali Asnan
Physiotherapy	(Indonesia) Ahmad Fakih Prasetyo
Masseur	(Indonesia) Andes Sandi Salavas
Kitman	(Indonesia) Supono (Indonesia) Mulyono

== Honours ==
- Liga Indonesia First Division
  - Runners-up (1): 2011–2012
- Liga Indonesia Second Division
  - Champions (1): 2010–11
- Liga 4 Central Java
  - Champions (1): 2025–26
