= PSIS Semarang =

Association football team in Indonesia

- Full name: Persatuan Sepakbola Indonesia Semarang
- Nicknames: Laskar Mahesa Jenar (Mahesa Jenar Army); Naga Warak (Warak Dragons)
- Short name: SMG
- Founded: 18 May 1932; 94 years ago
- Ground: Jatidiri Stadium
- Capacity: 18,000
- Owner: PT Mahesa Jenar Semarang
- CEO: Datu Nova Fatmawati
- Head coach: Widodo Cahyono Putro
- League: Championship
- 2025–26: Championship, 8th of 10th (Group 2)
- Website: psis.co.id
Home colours	Away colours

Persatuan Sepakbola Indonesia Semarang (lit. 'Indonesian Football Association of Semarang'), commonly known by its abbreviation PSIS is an Indonesian professional football club based in Semarang, Central Java. The club play their home matches at the Jatidiri Stadium. They are set to compete in Championship, the second tier of Indonesian football, following relegation in the 2024–25 Liga 1 season.

== History ==
Founded on 18 May 1932, PSIS is one of the oldest football teams in Indonesia. It was previously known as Voetbalbond Indonesia Semarang.

=== First title ===
Before the professional league was held in 1994–1995, PSIS joined Perserikatan, an amateur football competition organized by the PSSI. Their greatest success was in the 1986–87 season, when PSIS won the title after defeating Persebaya Surabaya in the final 1–0 by Syaiful Amri's goal. At the time, PSIS legend Ribut Waidi was in the team. There is now a sculpture of Ribut Waidi in the center of Semarang.

=== Ligina (Liga Indonesia) era ===
In 1994, when Perserikatan and Galatama merged to form Liga Indonesia, PSIS was placed in the Premier division. In the 1998–1999 season, PSIS attained their highest achievement by winning the probe. In the final, PSIS defeated Persebaya 1–0 in a final match held at Manado. The goal was scored by Tugiyo in the injury time of the second half. However, PSIS was ironically relegated in 1999–2000 season. A year later, PSIS managed to secure a promotion back to the Premier division.

=== Golden era: 2005–2007 ===
PSIS Semarang made a surprise by accomplishing the 3rd place after defeating PSMS Medan with a score of 2–1. The players like Muhammad Ridwan, Khusnul Yaqien, Modestus Setiawan, Idrus Gunawan, Maman Abdurrahman, Abdoulaye Djibril Diallo and Emanuel de Porras became superstars and following their success, were wanted by bigger teams. Result was achieved by coach Bambang Nurdiansyah.

In 2006, competing in the Western Zone, PSIS finished in 3rd place of the regular season. Therefore, PSIS went to the next round with 7 other teams, split into two groups of 4. PSIS won the first match against Arema Malang, courtesy of Gustavo Ortiz's goal. However, they were defeated by Persik Kediri with a score of 1–3 on matchday 2. PSIS needed a win in the last match against Persiba Balikpapan to progress to the semi-final, and they successfully booked a place with 1–0 victory in a controversially postponed match due to the pitch invasion by the fans. In the semi-final, PSIS won 1–0 against Persekabpas Pasuruan who defeated them twice in the regular season. In the grand final, PSIS met Persik Kediri once again, and was defeated with the score of 0–1 in extra time. The goal was scored by Cristian Gonzáles in 107th minute.

In 2007 season, PSIS successfully recruited Julio Lopez from Chile, projected as a replacement for Emanuel de Porras who controversially left the team after a defeat in the 2006 Liga Indonesia grand final.

=== Super League era ===
In the 2008 season, PSIS and PKT Bontang joined the Indonesia Super League, replacing Persmin Minahasa and Persiter Ternate.

In the 2011–2012 season, PSIS Semarang choose 2011–12 Indonesian Premier Division under the authority of PT Liga Prima Indonesia Sportindo (LPIS), finishing 5th.

In the 2013 season, PSIS moved to Divisi Utama. Ronald Fagundez and Addison Alves injuries contributed to defeated by the champion Persebaya, PSBS Biak Numfor, and PS Bangka.

=== Scandal in 2014 season ===
PSIS reinforced with two foreign players Julio Alcorsé and Ronald Fagundez, starting 2014 Liga Indonesia Premier Division at the top the standings in Group 4 with only 1 defeat. In the 2nd round, PSIS advanced to the semi-final along with PSS Sleman. Biggest victory came against Persiwa Wamena, with the score of 5–0. Hari Nur Yulianto scored 14, and Julio Alcorsé 13 goals.

PSS Sleman and PSIS Semarang were involved in match fixing, where both clubs wanted to be defeated in order not to meet Pusamania Borneo. Both teams scored 5 own goals in 7 minutes, and the game ended with 2-3 victory for Sleman. As a result of this scandal, PSIS Semarang was disqualified. Coach Eko Riyadi, players Saptono, Fadli Manan and Catur Adi Nugraha received lifetime bans and financial fines.

=== Liga 1 era ===
In the 2024–25 Liga 1 season PSIS were relegated to Liga 2 with two matches left.

== Players ==
=== Current squad ===
As of 23 September 2026

Note: Flags indicate national team as defined under FIFA eligibility rules; some limited exceptions apply. Players may hold more than one non-FIFA nationality.

No.	Pos.	Nation	Player
1	GK	IDN	Reky Rahayu
4	DF	IDN	Agus Nova
7	FW	ENG	Deri Corfe
8	MF	IDN	Syahrian Abimanyu
10	MF	ARG	Jonathan Bustos
11	FW	IDN	Miftahul Hamdi
12	DF	IDN	Nuri Fasya
13	DF	IDN	Bayu Fiqri
15	DF	BRA	Fabiano Beltrame
16	MF	IDN	Muammar Khadafi
17	FW	IDN	Ahmad Nufiandani
18	DF	IDN	Abduh Lestaluhu
19	MF	IDN	Ricki Ariansyah
20	DF	IDN	Habil Akbar
22	FW	IDN	Hari Nur Yulianto (captain)
25	DF	IDN	Akbar Arjunsyah
27	MF	IDN	Fitra Ridwan

No.	Pos.	Nation	Player
30	FW	IDN	Yohanes Gandrung
31	FW	IDN	Krisna Sulistia
32	MF	IDN	Rifky Dwi Septiawan (on loan from Persita Tangerang)
33	DF	IDN	Komang Tri (vice-captain)
38	GK	IDN	Bima Al-Rusi
41	DF	IDN	Amirul Fisabilillah
43	MF	IDN	Fadistya Mahendra
47	DF	IDN	Akmal Noor Hidayat
52	GK	IDN	Rizky Darmawan
70	FW	IDN	Thaufan Hidayat
73	FW	IDN	Seva Bernadine
77	FW	IDN	Lorensius Sabda
90	MF	IDN	Jack Brown
91	FW	ARG	Felipe Cadenazzi
96	GK	IDN	Ray Redondo
97	DF	IDN	Andy Setyo

=== Retired numbers ===
- 9 – Erik Dwi Ermawansyah (posthumous)

== Season-by-season records ==
Men's Team
Season	League	Tier	Tms.	Pos	Piala Indonesia	I-League Cup	ACLE	ACL 2	ACGL	ACC
1994–95	Premier Division	1	34	13th, East Division	–	–	–	–	–	–
1995–96	Premier Division	1	31	10th, East Division	–	–	–	–	–	–
1996–97	Premier Division	1	33	6th, Central Division	–	–	–	–	–	–
1997–98	Premier Division	1	31	did not finish	–	–	–	–	–	–
1998–99	Premier Division	1	28	1st	–	–	–	–	–	–
1999–2000	Premier Division	1	28	13th, East Division	–	–	First round	–	–	–
2001	First Division	2	23	1st	–	–	–	–	–	–
2002	Premier Division	1	24	8th, East Division	–	–	–	–	–	–
2003	Premier Division	1	20	13th	–	–	–	–	–	–
2004	Premier Division	1	18	10th	–	–	–	–	–	–
2005	Premier Division	1	28	3rd	R2	–	–	–	–	–
2006	Premier Division	1	28	2nd	R2	–	–	–	–	–
2007–08	Premier Division	1	36	10th, West Division	–	–	–	–	–	–
2008–09	Indonesia Super League	1	18	18th	R2	–	–	–	–	–
2009–10	Premier Division	2	33	6th, Group 2	–	–	–	–	–	–
2010–11	Premier Division	2	39	8th, Group 2	–	–	–	–	–	–
2011–12	Premier Division	2	28	5th, Group 2	R3	–	–	–	–	–
2013	Premier Division (LPIS)	2	21	10th, Group 1	–	–	–	–	–	–
2013	Premier Division (LI)	2	39	4th, Second round	–	–	–	–	–	–
2014	Premier Division	2	63	Third Round	–	–	–	–	–	–
2015	Premier Division	2	55	did not finish	–	–	–	–	–	–
2016	Indonesia Soccer Championship B	2	53	3rd, Second Round	–	–	–	–	–	–
2017	Liga 2	2	61	3rd	–	–	–	–	–	–
2018	Liga 1	1	18	10th	R16	–	–	–	–	–
2019	Liga 1	1	18	14th	R16	–	–	–	–	–
2020	Liga 1	1	18	did not finish	–	–	–	–	–	–
2021–22	Liga 1	1	18	7th	–	–	–	–	–	–
2022–23	Liga 1	1	18	13th	–	–	–	–	–	–
2023–24	Liga 1	1	18	6th	–	–	–	–	–	–
2024–25	Liga 1	1	18	18th	–	–	–	–	–	–
2025–26	Championship	2	20	8th, Group 2	–	–	–	–	–	–
2026–27	Championship	2	20	TBD	–	TBD	–	–	–	–

Women's Team
Season	League	Tier	Tms.	Pos
2019	Liga 1 Putri	1	10	5th, Group A

== Continental record ==
As of 1 September 1999

Competition	Pld	W	D	L	GF	GA
Asian Club Championship	2	0	0	2	4	9

Season	Competition	Round	Club	Home	Away	Aggregate
1999–2000	Asian Club Championship	First round	(South Korea) Suwon Samsung Bluewings	2–3	2–6	4–9

== Crest and colours ==
First crest

2006

2007–current

From the foundation of the club, the common home kit includes a blue shirt and blue shorts. The away kit of the club is associated with a white or black background.

== Supporters and rivalries ==
PSIS Semarang's supporters call themselves Panser Biru (Pasukan Supporter Semarang Biru) and SneX (Supporter Semarang Extreme). Panser Biru was founded on 25 March 2001. Earlier, on 22 October 2000, a Care Forum PSIS Semarang was created. SneX became an independent group on 20 March 2005.

=== Rivalries ===
PSIS has a rivalry with Persis Solo because of the prestige between the two teams in Central Java. The rivalry with Persebaya Surabaya was born from the controversy of Sepakbola Gajah since Perserikatan. PSIS supporters had a rivalry with Persijap Jepara because of the riots that had taken place.

== Mascot ==
Warak ngendog is a fictional fauna that depicts the symbols of unity of all ethnic groups in Semarang, namely Javanese, ethnic Arabian, and Chinese. Ethnic unity creates a harmonious and peaceful city of Semarang. The appearance of the Warak Ngendog animal is that its head resembles a horned dragon, its neck is long like a camel, while its body, legs and tail resemble those of a goat. At first glance, the Warak ngendog animal is similar to the Qilin animal, but the Kirin has a body like a horse and a tail like a lion.

The MJ (Mahesa Jenar) is identical to fictional figures that are more focused on one group, namely Islam.

Mascots are often used to liven up the atmosphere. They don't not only function as an identity, it also brings joy to fans of PSIS Semarang.

== Official staff ==
Position	Staff
Chief Executive Officer	(Indonesia) Datu Nova Fatmawati
Chief Operating Officer	(Indonesia) Fariz Julinar Maurisal
Manager	(Indonesia) Krisna Handaru Murti
Assistant Manager	(Indonesia) Mochammad Reza Handhika
General Manager	(Indonesia) Wafa Amri
Head Coach	(Indonesia) Widodo Cahyono Putro
Assistant Coach	(Indonesia) Agam Haris Pambudi
Assistant Coach	(Indonesia) Anang Dwita Diina
Assistant Coach	(Indonesia) Hamka Hamzah
Goalkeeping Coach	(Indonesia) I Komang Putra
Fitness Coach	(Indonesia) Gaselly Jun Panam
Analyst	(Indonesia) Jihad Alief Alfikri
Team Doctor	(Indonesia) Edi Suprayitno
Physiotherapist	(Indonesia) Dodi Okta Fiandanu
Kitman	(Indonesia) Ahmad Muala Isnad Rosa (Indonesia) Andika Eki Prasetyo (Indonesia) Hadi Sutikno
Masseur	(Indonesia) Abdul Kharis Murtadlo (Indonesia) Mochamad Mishwanuddin

== Honours ==
Domestic
League/Division	Titles	Runners-up	Seasons won	Seasons runners-up
Perserikatan	1	0	1986–87	
Liga Indonesia Premier Division	1	1	1998–99	2006
Liga Indonesia First Division	1	0	2001	
Perserikatan First Division	1	0	1983	

=== AFC (Asian competitions) ===
- Asian Club Championship
  - First round (1): 1999–2000

=== Friendly tournaments ===
- Piala Emas Bang Yos
  - Runner-Up (1): 2006
- Piala Kampoeng Semawis
  - Winner (1): 2009
- Piala Polda Jateng
  - Winner (1): 2015
- Piala Siliwangi
  - Winner (1): 1983
- Piala Tugu Muda
  - Winner (1): 1978
- Sultan Hassanal Bolkiah Cup
  - Runner-Up (1): 1987
- Trofeo Pesantenan
  - Runner-Up (1): 2019

== See also ==
- List of football clubs in Indonesia
