= 2021 Liga 3 East Java =

Tournament details
- Dates: 3 November–16 December 2021
- Teams: 69

Final positions
- Champions: NZR Sumbersari (1st title)
- Runners-up: Persedikab Kediri
- Third place: Gresik United
- Fourth place: Persewangi Banyuwangi

The 2021 Liga 3 East Java (also known as Liga 3 MS Glow For Men PSSI Jawa Timur for sponsorship reason) was the sixth season of Liga 3 East Java as a qualifying round for the national round of the 2021–22 Liga 3.

PSG Gresik (now AHHA PS Pati) were the defending champion.

== Teams ==
There are 69 teams participated in the league this season.

== Group stage ==
=== Group A ===
Pos	Team	Pld	W	D	L	GF	GA	GD	Pts	Qualification
1	Persedikab (H)	4	2	2	0	10	4	+6	8	Advanced to Knockout stage
2	Persekam	4	2	0	2	2	3	−1	6	Advanced to Knockout stage
3	PSID	4	1	2	1	6	6	0	5	
4	Persem	4	1	1	2	5	9	−4	4	
5	PSBI	4	0	3	1	3	4	−1	3	

Updated to match(es) played on 19 November 2021. Source: Liga 3 Jawa Timur
(H) Hosts

=== Group B ===
Pos	Team	Pld	W	D	L	GF	GA	GD	Pts	Qualification
1	NZR Sumbersari (H)	4	4	0	0	11	0	+11	12	Advanced to Knockout stage
2	Persema	4	3	0	1	13	3	+10	9	Advanced to Knockout stage
3	Gresik Putra	4	1	1	2	4	8	−4	4	
4	Triple's Kediri	4	1	1	2	4	12	−8	4	
5	Akor	4	0	0	4	4	13	−9	0	

Updated to match(es) played on 19 November 2021. Source: Liga 3 Jawa Timur
(H) Hosts

=== Group C ===
Pos	Team	Pld	W	D	L	GF	GA	GD	Pts	Qualification
1	Persida	4	4	0	0	15	1	+14	12	Advanced to Knockout stage
2	Gresik United (H)	4	3	0	1	13	2	+11	9	Advanced to Knockout stage
3	PS Surabaya Muda	4	2	0	2	7	10	−3	6	
4	Malang United	4	1	0	3	5	8	−3	3	
5	Maestro	4	0	0	4	0	19	−19	0	

Updated to match(es) played on 17 November 2021. Source: Liga 3 Jawa Timur
(H) Hosts

=== Group D ===
Pos	Team	Pld	W	D	L	GF	GA	GD	Pts	Qualification
1	Persepam (H)	3	3	0	0	4	0	+4	9	Advanced to Knockout stage
2	PS KoPa	3	2	0	1	7	3	+4	6	Advanced to Knockout stage
3	Perssu 1977	3	1	0	2	2	3	−1	3	
4	Kresna	3	0	0	3	1	8	−7	0	

Updated to match(es) played on 13 November 2021. Source: Liga 3 Jawa Timur
(H) Hosts

=== Group E ===
Pos	Team	Pld	W	D	L	GF	GA	GD	Pts	Qualification
1	Blitar Poetra (H)	4	2	2	0	12	6	+6	8	Advanced to Knockout stage
2	Arema Indonesia	4	2	2	0	10	5	+5	8	Advanced to Knockout stage
3	Perseta	4	1	3	0	9	8	+1	6	Best third-place
4	Akademi Arema Ngunut	4	1	0	3	5	8	−3	3	
5	Mojokerto	4	0	1	3	4	13	−9	1	

Updated to match(es) played on 17 November 2021. Source: Liga 3 Jawa Timur
(H) Hosts

=== Group F ===
Pos	Team	Pld	W	D	L	GF	GA	GD	Pts	Qualification
1	AC Majapahit (H)	4	4	0	0	11	0	+11	12	Advanced to Knockout stage
2	Mojosari Putra	4	3	0	1	5	3	+2	9	Advanced to Knockout stage
3	Bumi Wali	4	2	0	2	8	6	+2	6	Best third-place
4	Ngawi	4	1	0	3	2	8	−6	3	
5	Naga Emas Asri	4	0	0	4	2	11	−9	0	

Updated to match(es) played on 17 November 2021. Source: Liga 3 Jawa Timur
(H) Hosts

=== Group G ===
Pos	Team	Pld	W	D	L	GF	GA	GD	Pts	Qualification
1	Persibo (H)	4	4	0	0	15	0	+15	12	Advanced to Knockout stage
2	Persatu	4	3	0	1	11	1	+10	9	Advanced to Knockout stage
3	Lamongan	4	2	0	2	6	5	+1	6	
4	Persegres Putra	4	0	1	3	2	15	−13	1	
5	Gen-B Mojokerto	4	0	1	3	1	14	−13	1 (Note: Match result: Lamongan FC awarded a walk-over win because Gen-B Mojokerto did not attend the match.)	

Updated to match(es) played on 17 November 2021. Source: Liga 3 Jawa Timur
(H) Hosts

=== Group H ===
Pos	Team	Pld	W	D	L	GF	GA	GD	Pts	Qualification
1	Persiga (H)	4	3	1	0	6	3	+3	10	Advanced to Knockout stage
2	Persemag	4	1	3	0	5	3	+2	6	Advanced to Knockout stage
3	Perspa	4	1	2	1	4	4	0	5	
4	SWIs Magetan	4	1	1	2	3	4	−1	4	
5	Persenga	4	0	1	3	3	7	−4	1	

Updated to match(es) played on 19 November 2021. Source: Liga 3 Jawa Timur
(H) Hosts

=== Group I ===
Pos	Team	Pld	W	D	L	GF	GA	GD	Pts	Qualification
1	Madura	4	3	1	0	12	3	+9	10	Advanced to Knockout stage
2	Mitra Surabaya	4	1	3	0	3	1	+2	6	Advanced to Knockout stage
3	Bajul Ijo	4	1	1	2	3	7	−4	4	
4	Perseba (H)	4	1	1	2	4	9	−5	4	
5	Cahaya Madura Muda	4	1	0	3	3	5	−2	3	

Updated to match(es) played on 19 November 2021. Source: Liga 3 Jawa Timur
(H) Hosts

=== Group J ===
Pos	Team	Pld	W	D	L	GF	GA	GD	Pts	Qualification
1	Banyuwangi Putra	4	3	0	1	13	4	+9	9	Advanced to Knockout stage
2	Persid (H)	4	3	0	1	11	2	+9	9	Advanced to Knockout stage
3	PSIL	4	2	1	1	7	9	−2	7	Best third-place
4	Persipro	4	1	1	2	4	12	−8	4	
5	Singhasari	4	0	0	4	0	8	−8	0	

Updated to match(es) played on 22 November 2021. Source: Liga 3 Jawa Timur
(H) Hosts

=== Group K ===
Pos	Team	Pld	W	D	L	GF	GA	GD	Pts	Qualification
1	Putra Delta Sidoarjo (H)	4	3	1	0	17	1	+16	10	Advanced to Knockout stage
2	Deltras	4	3	1	0	17	3	+14	10	Advanced to Knockout stage
3	Persikoba	4	2	0	2	3	10	−7	6	
4	Assyabaab Bangil	4	0	1	3	4	12	−8	1	
5	PSAD Arek Suroboyo	4	0	1	3	3	18	−15	1	

Updated to match(es) played on 19 November 2021. Source: Liga 3 Jawa Timur
(H) Hosts

=== Group L ===
Pos	Team	Pld	W	D	L	GF	GA	GD	Pts	Qualification
1	Persekabpas (H)	4	4	0	0	20	1	+19	12	Advanced to Knockout stage
2	Persekap	4	3	0	1	16	2	+14	9	Advanced to Knockout stage
3	AFA Syailendra	4	2	0	2	9	5	+4	6	Best third-place
4	ASIFA	4	1	0	3	6	18	−12	3	
5	PS Mitra Bola Utama	4	0	0	4	0	25	−25	0	

Updated to match(es) played on 19 November 2021. Source: Liga 3 Jawa Timur
(H) Hosts

=== Group M ===
Pos	Team	Pld	W	D	L	GF	GA	GD	Pts	Qualification
1	Persinga (H)	4	4	0	0	9	2	+7	12	Advanced to Knockout stage
2	Persepon	4	3	0	1	10	2	+8	9	Advanced to Knockout stage
3	Persekama	4	2	0	2	5	5	0	6	
4	Bojonegoro	4	0	1	3	4	10	−6	1	
5	Nganjuk Ladang	4	0	1	3	3	12	−9	1	

Updated to match(es) played on 19 November 2021. Source: Liga 3 Jawa Timur
(H) Hosts

=== Group N ===
Pos	Team	Pld	W	D	L	GF	GA	GD	Pts	Qualification
1	PSPK	4	4	0	0	12	3	+9	12	Advanced to Knockout stage
2	Persewangi (H)	4	3	0	1	10	7	+3	9	Advanced to Knockout stage
3	Persebo Muda	4	1	1	2	2	8	−6	4	
4	Persikapro	4	1	0	3	5	7	−2	3	
5	PSSS	4	0	1	3	2	6	−4	1	

Updated to match(es) played on 19 November 2021. Source: Liga 3 Jawa Timur
(H) Hosts

== Knockout stage ==
Round of 32
A1	Persedikab	3
J3	PSIL	0
N1	PSPK	2
H2	Persemag	1
J1	Banyuwangi Putra	0
B2	Persema	1
M1	Persinga	0 (4)
D2	PS KoPa	0 (2)
E1	Blitar Poetra	0
K2	Deltras	4
G1	Persibo (W.O.)	0
I2	Mitra Surabaya	3
F1	AC Majapahit	0 (3)
L2	Persekap	0 (4)
C2	Gresik United	2
F3	Bumi Wali	0
B1	NZR Sumbersari	3
I3	AFA Syailendra	0
H1	Persiga	0
A2	Persekam	4
C1	Persida	2
J2	Persid	1
D1	Persepam	0
M2	Persepon	1
K1	Putra Delta Sidoarjo	2
F2	Mojosari Putra	0
I1	Madura	1
E2	Arema Indonesia	0
L1	Persekabpas	0
G2	Persatu	1
N2	Persewangi	5
E3	Perseta	1

Round of 16
Persedikab	2
PSPK	0
Persema	3
Persinga	5
Deltras	3
Mitra Surabaya	0
Persekap	1
Gresik United	2
NZR Sumbersari	4
Persekam	1
Persida	1
Persepon	0
Putra Delta Sidoarjo	3
Madura FC	0
Persatu	1
Persewangi	2

Quarterfinals
Persedikab	5
Persinga	0
Deltras	1
Gresik United	2
NZR Sumbersari	1
Persida	0
Putra Delta Sidoarjo	1
Persewangi	2

Semifinals
Persedikab	3
Gresik United	1
NZR Sumbersari	2
Persewangi	0

Finals
Persedikab	0
NZR Sumbersari	1
Third place
Gresik United	2
Persewangi	1
