= 2018 Liga 3 East Java =

Liga 3 Jawa Timur
- Season: 2018
- Champions: Persiga Trenggalek

The 2018 Liga 3 East Java (known as Liga 3 Kapal Api for sponsorship reasons) is the third edition of Liga 3 (formerly known as Liga Nusantara) East Java as a qualifying round for the national round of 2018 Liga 3. Blitar United (now in 2018 Liga 2), winner of the 2017 Liga 3 East Java are the defending champions. The competition began on 1 April 2018.

== Format ==
In this competition, 49 teams are divided into 7 groups of seven. The two best teams are through to knockout stage. The winner will represent East Java in national round of 2018 Liga 3.

== Teams ==
There are 49 clubs which will participate the league in this season.

== Group stage ==
This stage started on 1 April 2018.

=== Group A ===
Pos	Team	Pld	W	D	L	GF	GA	GD	Pts	Qualification
1	Deltras (Note: Deltras were deducted three points due to FIFA sanction)	12	11	1	0	28	1	+27	31	Advance to next round
2	Persesa Sampang	12	7	2	3	25	9	+16	23	Advance to next round
3	Cahaya Muda	12	5	2	5	33	20	+13	17	
4	Surabaya Muda (Note: Surabaya Muda were deducted six points due to PSSI sanction, as Surabaya Muda walked over in the match against Persesa)	12	6	0	6	19	20	−1	12	
5	Perseba Bangkalan	12	4	0	8	16	32	−16	12	
6	Mitra Surabaya	12	2	1	9	10	33	−23	7	
7	Maestro Parabola	12	2	2	8	7	23	−16	8	

Updated to match(es) played on 29 July 2018. Source: MD-1MD-2MD-3MD-4MD-5MD-6MD-7MD-8

=== Group B ===
Pos	Team	Pld	W	D	L	GF	GA	GD	Pts	Qualification
1	Malang United	11	9	0	2	25	13	+12	27	Advance to next round
2	Lamongan F.C.	12	8	0	4	24	17	+7	24	Advance to next round
3	PS Kota Pahlawan	12	7	2	3	14	6	+8	23	
4	Triple S Kediri	12	4	3	5	15	18	−3	15	
5	Bojonegoro F.C.	12	4	0	8	13	18	−5	12	
6	Persegres Putra	12	2	3	7	15	22	−7	9	
7	Madiun United	11	2	2	7	11	23	−12	8	

Updated to match(es) played on 25 July 2018. Source: MD-1MD-2MD-3MD-4MD-5MD-6MD-7MD-8

=== Group C ===
Pos	Team	Pld	W	D	L	GF	GA	GD	Pts	Qualification
1	Persedikab Kediri	12	10	2	0	35	7	+28	32	Advance to next round
2	Blitar Poetra	12	7	3	2	20	10	+10	24	Advance to next round
3	Persibo Bojonegoro	12	6	3	3	29	12	+17	21	
4	Persepon Ponorogo	12	5	2	5	10	15	−5	17	
5	Bumi Wali	12	5	1	6	15	18	−3	16	
6	Persemag Magetan	12	1	3	8	5	32	−27	6	
7	Perspa Pacitan	12	1	0	11	8	28	−20	3	

Updated to match(es) played on 29 July 2018. Source: MD-1MD-2MD-3MD-4MD-5MD-6MD-7MD-8

=== Group D ===
Pos	Team	Pld	W	D	L	GF	GA	GD	Pts	Qualification
1	Persekabpas Pasuruan	10	8	2	0	19	2	+17	26	Advance to next round
2	PSIL Lumajang	10	5	4	1	20	10	+10	19	Advance to next round
3	Probolinggo United	10	5	2	3	16	7	+9	17	
4	Putra Jombang	10	3	2	5	26	17	+9	11	
5	Jember United	10	2	2	6	7	16	−9	8	
6	Kresna F.C.	10	1	0	9	3	39	−36	3	
7	Kanjuruhan F.C.	0	0	0	0	0	0	0	0	Disqualified

Updated to match(es) played on 29 July 2018. Source: MD-1MD-2MD-3MD-4MD-5MD-6MD-7MD-8

=== Group E ===
Pos	Team	Pld	W	D	L	GF	GA	GD	Pts	Qualification
1	Persiga Trenggalek	12	8	3	1	31	6	+25	27	Advance to next round
2	Persema Malang 1953	12	8	3	1	32	9	+23	27	Advance to next round
3	Putra Sinar Giri	12	6	5	1	19	8	+11	23	
4	Perseta Tulungagung	12	3	2	7	21	24	−3	11	
5	ASIFA F.C.	12	3	2	7	23	41	−18	11	
6	Akademi Arema Ngunut	12	3	1	8	17	34	−17	10	
7	Gen B Mojokerto	12	3	0	9	11	32	−21	9	

Updated to match(es) played on 25 July 2018. Source: MD-1MD-2MD-3MD-4MD-5MD-6MD-7MD-8

=== Group F ===
Pos	Team	Pld	W	D	L	GF	GA	GD	Pts	Qualification
1	PSID Jombang	12	9	2	1	34	9	+25	29	Advance to next round
2	Persem Mojokerto	12	7	3	2	18	13	+5	24	Advance to next round
3	Arema Indonesia	12	5	3	4	13	16	−3	18	
4	Sumbersari F.C.	12	4	4	4	15	9	+6	16	
5	Persikoba Batu	12	4	3	5	20	18	+2	15	
6	Persenga Nganjuk	12	2	2	8	13	26	−13	8	
7	Persekama Madiun Regency	12	1	3	8	5	27	−22	6	

Updated to match(es) played on 29 July 2018. Source: MD-1MD-2MD-3MD-4MD-5MD-6MD-7MD-8

=== Group G ===
Pos	Team	Pld	W	D	L	GF	GA	GD	Pts	Qualification
1	PS Sindo Dharaka	10	7	2	1	20	9	+11	23	Advance to next round
2	PSSS Situbondo	10	7	1	2	24	3	+21	22	Advance to next round
3	Persid Jember	10	6	3	1	23	10	+13	21	
4	Persebo Muda Bondowoso	10	2	3	5	12	18	−6	9	
5	Banyuwangi Putra	10	2	2	6	7	20	−13	8	
6	Suryanaga Connection	10	0	1	9	6	32	−26	1	
7	Persikapro Probolinggo Regency	0	0	0	0	0	0	0	0	Disqualified

Updated to match(es) played on 29 July 2018. Source: MD-1MD-2MD-3MD-4MD-5MD-6MD-7MD-8
