= 2017 Liga 3 East Java =

Liga 3 East Java
- Season: 2017
- Champions: Blitar United

The 2017 Liga 3 East Java (also known as Liga 3 Kapal Api Jawa Timur for sponsorship reason) is the third edition of Liga 3 East Java as a qualifying round for the national round of 2017 Liga 3. Blitar United are the defending champions.

The competition scheduled starts on May 3, 2017.

== Teams ==
There are 41 clubs which will participate the league in this season.

== Groups ==
Group 1
Persewangi Banyuwangi
Persid Jember
PSIL Lumajang
Assyabab Bangil
PSSS Situbondo
Probolinggo United
Persebo Muda Bondowoso

Group 2
Persekabpas Pasuruan
Persikapro Probolinggo
PSPK Pasuruan City
Banyuwangi Putra F.C.
Mitra Bola Utama Sidoarjo
Mitra Surabaya

Group 3
Deltras Sidoarjo
Cahaya Muda FC Pamekasan
PS KoPa Surabaya
Persegres Putra
Bojonegoro F.C.
Pamekasan F.C.
Sinar Harapan FC Sidoarjo

Group 4
Persema Malang
Singosari FC
Persikoba Batu City
Blitar United
DPFF Malang United
Triple S Kediri
Persenga Nganjuk

Group 5
ASIFA Malang
Persema 1953
Blitar Poetra
Perseta Tulungagung
Persiga Trenggalek
Mojosari Putra
Arema Indonesia

Group 6
Persibo Bojonegoro
Bumi Wali FC Tuban
PSID Jombang
Putra Jombang
Persedikab Kediri
Lamongan FC
Ngawi FC

== Round 2 ==
Group A
Deltras Sidoarjo
Persid Jember
PSPK Pasuruan City

Group B
Blitar United
Persiga Trenggalek
Lamongan FC

Group C
Persibo Bojonegoro
Perseta Tulungagung
Persenga Nganjuk

Group D
Persekabpas Pasuruan
Persewangi Banyuwangi
Persegres Putra

== Semifinal ==
All matches was played in Brawijaya Stadium, Kediri City

MATCH 1

Deltras Sidoarjo (1 - 2) Blitar United

MATCH 2

Persibo Bojonegoro (2 - 0) Persekabpas Pasuruan

== 3rd Place ==
Match is played in Brawijaya Stadium, Kediri City on Sept 30th 2017

Deltras Sidoarjo (2 - 0) Persekabpas Pasuruan

== Final ==
Match is played in Brawijaya Stadium, Kediri City on Sept 30th 2017

Blitar United 1(3) - 1(1) Persibo Bojonegoro

== Qualified teams for National round ==
East Java was given 3 representative to the National round and 2 representative to Play-off round

- 3 teams to National round :

National round
Blitar United
Persibo Bojonegoro
Deltras Sidoarjo

- 2 teams to Play-off round:

Play-off round
Persekabpas Pasuruan
Persiga Trenggalek
