= 2024–25 Liga 4 East Java =

Liga 4 East Java
- Season: 2024–25
- Dates: 4 January – 23 February 2025
- Champions: Persewangi (1st title)
- National phase: Persewangi; Persinga; PS Mojokerto Putra; Persema; Sang Maestro; Mitra Surabaya; Inter Kediri; Persikoba
- Matches: 199
- Goals: 584 (2.93 per match)
- Biggest win: PSPK 0–10 PS Kota Pahlawan (8 January 2025)
- Highest scoring: PSPK 0–10 PS Kota Pahlawan (8 January 2025)

The 2024–25 Liga 4 East Java (also known as 2024–25 Liga 4 Kapal Api PSSI East Java for sponsorship reason) was the inaugural season of Liga 4 East Java after the structural changes of Indonesian football competition and serves as a qualifying round for the national phase of the 2024–25 Liga 4. The competition is organised by the East Java Provincial PSSI Association.

== Teams ==
=== Teams changes ===
The following teams changed division after the 2023–24 season.

▲ Promoted to Liga 2
- Persibo
▲ Qualified for Liga Nusantara
- NZR Sumbersari
- Persekabpas
- PSM Madiun

=== Name changes ===
- Perseta merged with Batara, becoming Perseta Batara and relocating to Banyuwangi, but this season they officially still use the name Perseta Tulungagung.
- Singhasari change their official name to Blayu Football Club from this season.
- Kresna UNESA removed "Kresna" from its official name and change their full name to UNESA Football Club from this season.
- PS Kota Pahlawan merged with Gressia, becoming PS KoPa Gressia, however for this season they will still compete under the PS Kota Pahlawan name.
- Arema Indonesia changed its official name to ArekMalang Indonesia after receiving a cease and desist letter from Arema over the dual use of the name "Arema".

=== Participating teams ===
A total of 66 teams are competing in this season.

No	Team	Location	2023–24 season
1	Perseba	Bangkalan Regency	First round (3rd in Group M)
2	Banyuwangi Putra	Banyuwangi Regency	Third round (4th in Group II)
3	Mitra Surabaya	Banyuwangi Regency	Second round (4th in Group AA)
4	Perseta	Banyuwangi Regency	First round (4th in Group I)
5	Persewangi	Banyuwangi Regency	Third round (3rd in Group KK)
6	Persikoba	Batu City	First round (3rd in Group I)
7	PSBK	Blitar City	First round (4th in Group L)
8	PS Blitar Raya	Blitar City	—
9	Blitar Poetra	Blitar Regency	—
10	Persebo 1964	Bondowoso Regency	First round (3rd in Group C)
11	Persebo Muda	Bondowoso Regency	First round (3rd in Group B)
12	Bojonegoro (Note: Replacing Persemag)	Bojonegoro Regency	First round (4th in Group K)
13	Persegres Putra	Gresik Regency	—
14	Persid	Jember Regency	Third round (4th in Group HH)
15	Akor	Jombang Regency	—
16	PSID	Jombang Regency	—
17	Inter Kediri	Kediri City	First round (4th in Group N)
18	FC Pare	Kediri Regency	—
19	Persedikab	Kediri Regency	Runner-up
20	Triple'S Kediri	Kediri Regency	Second round (4th in Group BB)
21	Lamongan	Lamongan Regency	—
22	PSIL	Lumajang Regency	Third round (3rd in Group II)
23	Persekama	Madiun Regency	Second round (3rd in Group GG)
24	ArekMalang Indonesia	Malang City	First round (4th in Group J)
25	ASIFA	Malang City	—
26	Malang United	Malang City	First round (4th in Group A)
27	Persema	Malang City	First round (4th in Group H)
28	Blayu	Malang Regency	First round (3rd in Group F)
29	Persekam	Malang Regency	Second round (4th in Group DD)
30	Gen–B Mojokerto	Mojokerto City	—
31	Persem	Mojokerto City	—
32	AC Majapahit	Mojokerto Regency	Second round (4th in Group CC)
33	Mojokerto	Mojokerto Regency	—
34	Mojosari Putra	Mojokerto Regency	—
35	PS Mojokerto Putra	Mojokerto Regency	Third round (3rd in Group HH)

No	Team	Location	2023–24 season
36	Nganjuk Ladang	Nganjuk Regency	—
37	Persenga	Nganjuk Regency	First round (4th in Group E)
38	Ngawi	Ngawi Regency	—
39	Persinga	Ngawi Regency	First round (3rd in Group J)
40	Perspa	Pacitan Regency	Second round (4th in Group GG)
41	Cahaya Madura Muda	Pamekasan Regency	—
42	Persepam	Pamekasan Regency	Second round (3rd in Group BB)
43	Pasuruan United	Pasuruan City	Fourth round (3rd in Group LL)
44	Persekap	Pasuruan City	First round (3rd in Group A)
45	PSPK	Pasuruan City	First round (3rd in Group G)
46	Assyabaab Bangil	Pasuruan Regency	Second round (3rd in Group CC)
47	Persepon	Ponorogo Regency	First round (3rd in Group K)
48	PSHW	Ponorogo Regency	—
49	Persipro 1954	Probolinggo City	Third round (4th in Group KK)
50	Persikapro	Probolinggo Regency	—
51	Persesa	Sampang Regency	First round (4th in Group M)
52	Persida	Sidoarjo Regency	—
53	Sinar Harapan	Sidoarjo Regency	—
54	PSSS	Situbondo Regency	—
55	Perssu	Sumenep Regency	Fourth round (4th in Group MM)
56	Bajul Ijo	Surabaya City	First round (4th in Group F)
57	Hizbul Wathan	Surabaya City	—
58	PS Kota Pahlawan	Surabaya City	—
59	Sang Maestro	Surabaya City	—
60	Surabaya Muda	Surabaya City	First round (4th in Group C)
61	Suryanaga Connection	Surabaya City	Second round (4th in Group FF)
62	UNESA	Surabaya City	First round (3rd in Group H)
63	Persiga	Trenggalek Regency	Third round (3rd in Group JJ)
64	Bumi Wali	Tuban Regency	—
65	Naga Emas Asri	Tulungagung Regency	First round (3rd in Group D)
66	Perseta 1970	Tulungagung Regency	Fourth round (4th in Group LL)

=== Personnel and kits ===
Since 2017, the provincial competition underneath the East Java Provincial PSSI Association has been sponsored by PT Santos Jaya Abadi, with all teams bearing the logos of the company's products as their main kit sponsor - Kapal Api, Kopi ABC, and Fresco. All teams' kits also bear the logo of Sarung Mangga, who have also sponsored the competition since 2023.

Note: Flags indicate national team as has been defined under FIFA eligibility rules. Players and Managers may hold more than one non-FIFA nationality.

Group A

Team	Head coach	Captain	Kit manufacturer	Main kit sponsor	Secondary kit sponsor	Other kit sponsor(s)
Persewangi	(Indonesia) Alexander Saununu		(Indonesia) TM Sportswear	Kopi ABC	Sarung Mangga	List: Front: Flynet; Back: None; Sleeves: Banyuwangi Rebound; Shorts: None
Persebo Muda			(Indonesia) Lekaw	Kapal Api	Sarung Mangga	List: Front: None; Back: None; Sleeves: None; Shorts: None
Banyuwangi Putra			(Indonesia) Segara	Fresco	Sarung Mangga	List: Front: PT Aura Indonesia, Universitas PGRI Banyuwangi; Back: None; Sleeves: None; Shorts: None
PSSS			(Indonesia) Lekaw	Fresco	Sarung Mangga	List: Front: JConnect; Back: AKA Air Mineral; Sleeves: None; Shorts: None

Group B

Team	Head coach	Captain	Kit manufacturer	Main kit sponsor	Secondary kit sponsor	Other kit sponsor(s)
Mitra Surabaya			(Indonesia) Noto	Fresco	Sarung Mangga	List: Front: EGO Trading; Back: Fisioroom, DEECORP, Trisakti Management; Sleeves: None; Shorts: None
Persebo 1964	(Indonesia) Sabeq Fahmi Fahrezy		(Indonesia) YF Cloth	Kapal Api	Sarung Mangga	List: Front: None; Back: None; Sleeves: None; Shorts: None
Perseta			(Indonesia) Segara	Kapal Api	Sarung Mangga	List: Front: Trisakti Management; Back: None; Sleeves: None; Shorts: None
Persikapro			(Indonesia) Lekaw	Kopi ABC	Sarung Mangga	List: Front: None; Back: None; Sleeves: None; Shorts: None

Group C

Team	Head coach	Captain	Kit manufacturer	Main kit sponsor	Secondary kit sponsor	Other kit sponsor(s)
Persid			(Indonesia) Raung Apparel^{1}	Fresco	Sarung Mangga	List: Front: BIG Access GMDP; Back: Bank Jatim, Top4, Jember Roxy Square; Sleeves: None; Shorts: None
PSIL			(Indonesia) YF Cloth	Kapal Api	Sarung Mangga	List: Front: Nogosari Leather; Back: Mahkota Gold; Sleeves: None; Shorts: None
Persipro 1954			(Indonesia) Samba Apparel	Kopi ABC	Sarung Mangga	List: Front: Diva Dava Residence; Back: Prima Sagara; Sleeves: None; Shorts: None
Persekap	(Indonesia) M. Suhaimi		(Indonesia) Samba Apparel	Kapal Api	Sarung Mangga	List: Front: Tractorindo; Back: BPJS Ketenagakerjaan, PT Rizrafa Mitra Sejahtera, Segelast!, RSU Wajak Husada, Arto Berkah Indonesia; Sleeves: None; Shorts: None

Group D

Team	Head coach	Captain	Kit manufacturer	Main kit sponsor	Secondary kit sponsor	Other kit sponsor(s)
Perseba			(Indonesia) YF Cloth	Kapal Api	Sarung Mangga	List: Front: Begundal Construction; Back: Bebek Sinjay; Sleeves: None; Shorts: None
Persepam			(Indonesia) YF Cloth	Kapal Api	Sarung Mangga	List: Front: None; Back: None; Sleeves: None; Shorts: None
Persesa	(Indonesia) Wimba Sutan		(Indonesia) RMB Apparel	Kapal Api	Sarung Mangga	List: Front: Bos Jitu; Back: PT Sampang Sarana Shorebase, GSM, PDAM Trunojoyo, Bank Sampang; Sleeves: None; Shorts: None
Perssu			(Indonesia) Trops	Kopi ABC	Sarung Mangga	List: Front: Kangean Energy Indonesia, AF Sport, PLN Nusantara Power Services; Back: Garam Lososa, Alfanet; Sleeves: Shorts:
Cahaya Madura Muda	(Indonesia) Daniel Rokito		(Indonesia) YF Cloth	Kopi ABC	Sarung Mangga	List: Front: MBS, BANI; Back: Sleeves: Shorts:

Group E

Team	Head coach	Captain	Kit manufacturer	Main kit sponsor	Secondary kit sponsor	Other kit sponsor(s)
Persida			(Indonesia) YF Cloth	Kapal Api	Sarung Mangga	List: Front: Back: Sleeves: Shorts:
Sang Maestro			(Indonesia) YF Cloth	Kapal Api	Sarung Mangga	List: Front: Back: Sleeves: Shorts:
Akor			(Indonesia) RG Sportwear	Kapal Api	Sarung Mangga	List: Front: None; Back: None; Sleeves: None; Shorts: None
Gen-B Mojokerto			(Indonesia) YF Cloth	Kopi ABC	Sarung Mangga	List: Front: Back: Sleeves: Shorts:

Group F

Team	Head coach	Captain	Kit manufacturer	Main kit sponsor	Secondary kit sponsor	Other kit sponsor(s)
Sinar Harapan			(Indonesia) YF Cloth	Kapal Api	Sarung Mangga	List: Front: Back: Az Zahra; Sleeves: Shorts:
PS Kota Pahlawan			(Indonesia) Lekaw	Kopi ABC	Sarung Mangga	List: Front: Gressia Jaya Indonesia, PT Smelting; Back: EmiraGrow; Sleeves: None; Shorts: None
Mojokerto	(Indonesia) Dedeyan Surdani		(Indonesia) YF Cloth	Fresco	Sarung Mangga	List: Front: Back: Sleeves: Shorts:
PSPK			(Indonesia) YF Cloth	Kopi ABC	Sarung Mangga	List: Front: Back: Sleeves: Shorts:

Group G

Team	Head coach	Captain	Kit manufacturer	Main kit sponsor	Secondary kit sponsor	Other kit sponsor(s)
ArekMalang Indonesia			(Indonesia) A7	Kopi ABC	Sarung Mangga	List: Front: Jiren.id; Back: PermataLand.id; Sleeves: Shorts:
Mojosari Putra	(Indonesia) Nono Srihartono		(Indonesia) RG Sportwear	Kapal Api	Sarung Mangga	List: Front: Pondok Pesantren eLKISI; Back: None; Sleeves: None; Shorts: None
Suryanaga Connection			(Indonesia) Lekaw	Kopi ABC	Sarung Mangga	List: Front: None; Back: None; Sleeves: None; Shorts: None
Blayu			(Indonesia) YF Cloth	Fresco	Sarung Mangga	List: Front: PT Eka Family Perkasa; Back: Sleeves: Shorts:

Group H

Team	Head coach	Captain	Kit manufacturer	Main kit sponsor	Secondary kit sponsor	Other kit sponsor(s)
Persikoba	(Indonesia) Arif Suyono		(Indonesia) Fans Apparel	Kapal Api	Sarung Mangga	List: Front: Simpangsiur 68, Concrete Batu, Grand Pujon View; Back: Concrete Batu, Bara-Bara Shoes; Sleeves: Qisti Indonesia; Shorts: None
PSBK	(Indonesia) Aries Imansyah		(Indonesia) YF Cloth	Kapal Api	Sarung Mangga	List: Front: Aura Air Minum; Back: None; Sleeves: None; Shorts: None
Persekam			(Indonesia) Fans Apparel	Fresco	Sarung Mangga	List: Front: Kontraktor 77; Back: None; Sleeves: None; Shorts: None
Blitar Poetra				Fresco	Sarung Mangga	List: Front: Back: Sleeves: Shorts:

Group I

Team	Head coach	Captain	Kit manufacturer	Main kit sponsor	Secondary kit sponsor	Other kit sponsor(s)
PS Mojokerto Putra			(Indonesia) YF Cloth	Kopi ABC	Sarung Mangga	List: Front: Patriots Group, Jamu Iboe; Back: Sleeves: Shorts:
Assyabaab Bangil					Sarung Mangga	List: Front: Back: Sleeves: Shorts:
PSID	(Indonesia) Hendriawan Dwi		(Indonesia) RMB Apparel	Fresco	Sarung Mangga	List: Front: None; Back: Eknan Group, NSG Official, Fish Meal; Sleeves: None; Shorts: None
Surabaya Muda			(Indonesia) RMB Apparel	Kopi ABC	Sarung Mangga	List: Front: None; Back: None; Sleeves: None; Shorts: None
Pasuruan United	(Indonesia) Jefri Kurniawan		(Indonesia) YF Cloth	Fresco	Sarung Mangga	List: Front: Kopi Langit’81 Trans; Back: None; Sleeves: None; Shorts: None

Group J

Team	Head coach	Captain	Kit manufacturer	Main kit sponsor	Secondary kit sponsor	Other kit sponsor(s)
Triple'S Kediri			(Indonesia) Sith	Fresco	Sarung Mangga	List: Front: Deathless Empire, Tell Kopi; Back: None; Sleeves: Planet Physio; Shorts: None
FC Pare			(Indonesia) ALB Apparel	Fresco	Sarung Mangga	List: Front: Anekapay, 3Kiosk; Back: None; Sleeves: None; Shorts: None
ASIFA			(Indonesia) Made by club	Kapal Api	Sarung Mangga	List: Front: ASIFA; Back: None; Sleeves: None; Shorts: None
Malang United	(Indonesia) Bambang Pujo		(Indonesia) YF Cloth	Kopi ABC	Sarung Mangga	List: Front: Sansain Farma; Back: tentangbola.com; Sleeves: Shorts:

Group K

Team	Head coach	Captain	Kit manufacturer	Main kit sponsor	Secondary kit sponsor	Other kit sponsor(s)
Persedikab	(Indonesia) Ambitie Dolus Cahyana		(Indonesia) ALB Apparel	Fresco	Sarung Mangga	List: Front: Back: Sleeves: RSUD Kabupaten Kediri; Shorts:
Persenga	(Indonesia) Heru Sunarno		(Indonesia) Leon	Fresco	Sarung Mangga	List: Front: PT Borneo Jaya Sakti; Back: None; Sleeves: None; Shorts: None
Persiga			(Indonesia) Lekaw	Kapal Api	Sarung Mangga	List: Front: None; Back: None; Sleeves: None; Shorts: None
Persekama			(Indonesia) YF Cloth	Fresco	Sarung Mangga	List: Front: KAI, Bank Jatim; Back: Sleeves: Shorts:

Group L

Team	Head coach	Captain	Kit manufacturer	Main kit sponsor	Secondary kit sponsor	Other kit sponsor(s)
Inter Kediri			(Indonesia) YF Cloth	Kapal Api	Sarung Mangga	List: Front: Back: Sleeves: Shorts:
PS Blitar Raya			(Indonesia) YF Cloth	Kopi ABC	Sarung Mangga	List: Front: Back: Sleeves: Shorts:
Naga Emas Asri			(Indonesia) Reds!	Kapal Api	Sarung Mangga	List: Front: Back: Sleeves: Kunir Asam Bu Yayuk; Shorts:
Bojonegoro	(Indonesia) Bambang Pramudji		(Indonesia) YF Cloth	Kapal Api	Sarung Mangga	List: Front: Back: Sleeves: Shorts:

Group M

Team	Head coach	Captain	Kit manufacturer	Main kit sponsor	Secondary kit sponsor	Other kit sponsor(s)
Nganjuk Ladang	(Indonesia) Hartono		(Indonesia) Lekaw	Fresco	Sarung Mangga	List: Front: PT Karya Usaha Group; Back: None; Sleeves: None; Shorts: None
Ngawi	(Indonesia) Edy Sutrisno		(Indonesia) Galaxy Sport	Fresco	Sarung Mangga	List: Front: Trisakti Hotel & Cruise Ship; Back: Mas Antok DRJ, Tirta Herbal Sukses, Invecta Radia Nagari; Sleeves: B. Digital Printing, Bang Roni; Shorts: None
Bumi Wali			(Indonesia) YF Cloth	Fresco	Sarung Mangga	List: Front: Back: Sleeves: Shorts:
Lamongan			(Indonesia) Etams	Kopi ABC	Sarung Mangga	List: Front: Ubet Jaya Konstruksi; Back: None; Sleeves: None; Shorts: None

Group N

Team	Head coach	Captain	Kit manufacturer	Main kit sponsor	Secondary kit sponsor	Other kit sponsor(s)
Persem	(Indonesia) Adi Prasetyo	(Indonesia) Aryosutan Rajikar	(Indonesia) RMB Apparel	Kopi ABC	Sarung Mangga	List: Front: Back: Sleeves: Shorts:
Persegres Putra			(Indonesia) Lekaw	Fresco	Sarung Mangga	List: Front: None; Back: None; Sleeves: None; Shorts: None
Bajul Ijo			(Indonesia) YF Cloth	Kapal Api	Sarung Mangga	List: Front: None; Back: None; Sleeves: None; Shorts: None
UNESA			(Indonesia) RG Sportwear	Kopi ABC	Sarung Mangga	List: Front: Blue Harbor Bali - Nusa Penida; Back: Sleeves: Shorts:

Group O

Team	Head coach	Captain	Kit manufacturer	Main kit sponsor	Secondary kit sponsor	Other kit sponsor(s)
Perseta 1970	(Indonesia) Medi Redondo	(Indonesia) Muhamad Nurngaini	(Indonesia) RG Sportwear	Kapal Api	Sarung Mangga	List: Front: None; Back: None; Sleeves: None; Shorts: None
Persema	(Indonesia) Ahmad Bustomi	(Indonesia) Dzakwan Mangiawang	(Indonesia) HSP Sportwear	Kopi ABC	Sarung Mangga	List: Front: Bintang Galaxy Football Academy; Back: None; Sleeves: None; Shorts: None
AC Majapahit			(Indonesia) YF Cloth	Kopi ABC	Sarung Mangga	List: Front: Back: Sleeves: Shorts:
Hizbul Wathan			(Indonesia) RISPORT	Kapal Api	Sarung Mangga	List: Front: Universitas Muhammadiyah Lamongan, SMK Muhammadiyah 1 Surabaya, Universitas Muhammadiyah Surabaya; Back: SMA Muhammadiyah 10 Surabaya, SMP Muhammadiyah 2; Sleeves: SMK Muhammadiyah 1 Surabaya; Shorts: None

Group P

Team	Head coach	Captain	Kit manufacturer	Main kit sponsor	Secondary kit sponsor	Other kit sponsor(s)
Persepon			(Indonesia) YF Cloth	Fresco	Sarung Mangga	List: Front: Back: Sleeves: Shorts:
PSHW		(Indonesia) Thalib Abdul Halim	(Indonesia) YF Cloth	Kapal Api	Sarung Mangga	List: Front: Universitas Muhammadiyah Surabaya; Back: Universitas Muhammadiyah Ponorogo; Sleeves: Shorts:
Perspa			(Indonesia) Lekaw	Kopi ABC	Sarung Mangga	List: Front: Pandu Jaya; Back: Ayo Dolan Pacitan, Pantai Klayar; Sleeves: Shorts:
Persinga			(Indonesia) ADSport	Kapal Api	Sarung Mangga	List: Front: Bank Jatim; Back: Mas Antok DRJ, Laskar Ngawi; Sleeves: None; Shorts: None

Notes:

1. Apparel made by club.

== Schedule ==
The schedule of the competition is as follows.

Round	Matchday	Date
First round	Matchday 1	4–7 & 12 January 2025
First round	Matchday 2	7–9 & 14 January 2025
First round	Matchday 3	9–11 & 15 January 2025
First round	Matchday 4	11 January 2025
First round	Matchday 5	13 January 2025
Second round	Matchday 1	20–21 January 2025
Second round	Matchday 2	22–23 January 2025
Second round	Matchday 3	23–25 January 2025
Third round	Matchday 1	31 January – 1 February 2025
Third round	Matchday 2	2–3 February 2025
Third round	Matchday 3	4–5 February 2025
Fourth round	Matchday 1	11 February 2025
Fourth round	Matchday 2	13 February 2025
Fourth round	Matchday 3	15 February 2025
Knockout round	Semi-finals	21 February 2025
Knockout round	Third place play-off	23 February 2025
Knockout round	Final	23 February 2025

== First round ==
The draw for the first round took place on 12 December 2024 in Surabaya. The 66 teams will be drawn into 16 groups of four or five based on the geographical location of their homebase. The first round will be played in a home tournament format of single round-robin matches.

The top two teams of each group will qualify for the second round.

=== Group A ===
All matches will be held at Diponegoro Stadium, Banyuwangi.

Pos	Team	Pld	W	D	L	GF	GA	GD	Pts	Qualification	PWG	BPT	PSS	PBO
1	Persewangi (H)	3	2	1	0	9	1	+8	7	Qualification to the second round	—	—	4–0	4–0
2	Banyuwangi Putra	3	1	2	0	5	4	+1	5	Qualification to the second round	1–1	—	1–1	—
3	PSSS	3	1	1	1	4	6	−2	4		—	—	—	3–1
4	Persebo Muda	3	0	0	3	3	10	−7	0		—	2–3	—	—

Source: Liga 4 East Java
Legend: Blue = home team win; Yellow = draw; Red = away team win.
Rules for classification: 1) Points; 2) Head-to-head points; 3) Head-to-head goal difference; 4) Head-to-head goals scored; 5) Goal difference; 6) Goals scored; 7) Fair-play points; 8) Draw.
(H) Hosts

Matches

Matchday 1 (6 January 2025)
6 January 2025
13.00 WIB (UTC+7)

Persebo Muda	2–3	Banyuwangi Putra
	Report

Diponegoro Stadium, Banyuwangi
6 January 2025
15.00 WIB (UTC+7)

Persewangi	4–0	PSSS
	Report

Diponegoro Stadium, Banyuwangi

Matchday 2 (8 January 2025)
8 January 2025
13.00 WIB (UTC+7)

Banyuwangi Putra	1–1	Persewangi
	Report

Diponegoro Stadium, Banyuwangi
8 January 2025
15.00 WIB (UTC+7)

PSSS	3–1	Persebo Muda
	Report

Diponegoro Stadium, Banyuwangi

Matchday 3 (10 January 2025)
10 January 2025
13.15 WIB (UTC+7)

Banyuwangi Putra	1–1	PSSS
	Report

Diponegoro Stadium, Banyuwangi
10 January 2025
15.15 WIB (UTC+7)

Persewangi	4–0	Persebo Muda
	Report

Diponegoro Stadium, Banyuwangi

=== Group B ===
All matches will be held at Diponegoro Stadium, Banyuwangi.

Pos	Team	Pld	W	D	L	GF	GA	GD	Pts	Qualification	MTR	PBO	PTA	PRO
1	Mitra Surabaya (H)	3	3	0	0	11	0	+11	9	Qualification to the second round	—	6–0	—	3–0
2	Persebo 1964	3	1	1	1	2	7	−5	4	Qualification to the second round	—	—	1–1	—
3	Perseta	3	0	2	1	1	3	−2	2		0–2	—	—	0–0
4	Persikapro	3	0	1	2	0	4	−4	1		—	0–1	—	—

Source: Liga 4 East Java
Legend: Blue = home team win; Yellow = draw; Red = away team win.
Rules for classification: 1) Points; 2) Head-to-head points; 3) Head-to-head goal difference; 4) Head-to-head goals scored; 5) Goal difference; 6) Goals scored; 7) Fair-play points; 8) Draw.
(H) Hosts

Matches

Matchday 1 (7 January 2025)
7 January 2025
13.00 WIB (UTC+7)

Persebo 1964	1–1	Perseta
	Report

Bima Sakti Field, Banyuwangi
7 January 2025
15.00 WIB (UTC+7)

Mitra Surabaya	3–0	Persikapro
	Report

Bima Sakti Field, Banyuwangi

Matchday 2 (9 January 2025)
9 January 2025
13.00 WIB (UTC+7)

Perseta	0–2	Mitra Surabaya
	Report

Bima Sakti Field, Banyuwangi
9 January 2025
15.00 WIB (UTC+7)

Persikapro	0–1	Persebo 1964
	Report

Bima Sakti Field, Banyuwangi

Matchday 3 (11 January 2025)
11 January 2025
13.15 WIB (UTC+7)

Perseta	0–0	Persikapro
	Report

Bima Sakti Field, Banyuwangi
11 January 2025
15.15 WIB (UTC+7)

Mitra Surabaya	6–0	Persebo 1964
	Report

Bima Sakti Field, Banyuwangi

=== Group C ===
All matches will be held at Jember Sport Garden Stadium, Jember.

Pos	Team	Pld	W	D	L	GF	GA	GD	Pts	Qualification	PSD	PRO	KAP	PSL
1	Persid (H)	3	2	1	0	7	1	+6	7	Qualification to the second round	—	—	4–0	2–0
2	Persipro 1954	3	1	2	0	3	2	+1	5	Qualification to the second round	1–1	—	1–1	—
3	Persekap	3	1	1	1	3	6	−3	4		—	—	—	2–1
4	PSIL	3	0	0	3	1	5	−4	0		—	0–1	—	—

Source: Liga 4 East Java
Legend: Blue = home team win; Yellow = draw; Red = away team win.
Rules for classification: 1) Points; 2) Head-to-head points; 3) Head-to-head goal difference; 4) Head-to-head goals scored; 5) Goal difference; 6) Goals scored; 7) Fair-play points; 8) Draw.
(H) Hosts

Matches

Matchday 1 (4–5 January 2025)
4 January 2025
15.00 WIB (UTC+7)

Persid	4–0	Persekap
	Report

Jember Sport Garden Stadium, Jember
5 January 2025
13.00 WIB (UTC+7)

PSIL	0–1	Persipro 1954
	Report

Jember Sport Garden Stadium, Jember

Matchday 2 (7 January 2025)
7 January 2025
13.00 WIB (UTC+7)

Persipro 1954	1–1	Persid
	Report

Jember Sport Garden Stadium, Jember
7 January 2025
15.00 WIB (UTC+7)

Persekap	2–1	PSIL
	Report

Jember Sport Garden Stadium, Jember

Matchday 3 (9 January 2025)
9 January 2025
13.15 WIB (UTC+7)

Persipro 1954	1–1	Persekap
	Report

Jember Sport Garden Stadium, Jember
9 January 2025
15.15 WIB (UTC+7)

Persid	2–0	PSIL
	Report

Jember Sport Garden Stadium, Jember

=== Group D ===
All matches will be held at Gelora Bangkalan Stadium, Bangkalan.

Pos	Team	Pld	W	D	L	GF	GA	GD	Pts	Qualification	PSU	PSA	PBA	PAM	CHY
1	Perssu	4	2	2	0	7	3	+4	8	Qualification to the second round	—	0–0	2–2	—	—
2	Persesa	4	2	2	0	7	4	+3	8	Qualification to the second round	—	—	1–0	2–2	—
3	Perseba (H)	4	2	1	1	8	3	+5	7		—	—	—	4–0	2–0
4	Persepam	4	1	1	2	6	10	−4	4		1–3	—	—	—	3–1
5	Cahaya Madura Muda	4	0	0	4	3	11	−8	0		0–2	2–4	—	—	—

Source: Liga 4 East Java
Legend: Blue = home team win; Yellow = draw; Red = away team win.
Rules for classification: 1) Points; 2) Head-to-head points; 3) Head-to-head goal difference; 4) Head-to-head goals scored; 5) Goal difference; 6) Goals scored; 7) Fair-play points; 8) Draw.
(H) Hosts

Matches

Matchday 1 (5 January 2025)
5 January 2025
13.00 WIB (UTC+7)

Persesa	2–2	Persepam
	Report

Gelora Bangkalan Stadium, Bangkalan
5 January 2025
15.00 WIB (UTC+7)

Cahaya Madura Muda	0–2	Perssu
	Report

Gelora Bangkalan Stadium, Bangkalan

Matchday 2 (7 January 2025)
7 January 2025
13.00 WIB (UTC+7)

Perssu	2–2	Perseba
	Report

Gelora Bangkalan Stadium, Bangkalan
7 January 2025
15.00 WIB (UTC+7)

Cahaya Madura Muda	2–4	Persesa
	Report

Gelora Bangkalan Stadium, Bangkalan

Matchday 3 (9 January 2025)
9 January 2025
13.00 WIB (UTC+7)

Perseba	2–0	Cahaya Madura Muda
	Report

Gelora Bangkalan Stadium, Bangkalan
9 January 2025
15.00 WIB (UTC+7)

Persepam	1–3	Perssu
	Report

Gelora Bangkalan Stadium, Bangkalan

Matchday 4 (11 January 2025)
11 January 2025
13.00 WIB (UTC+7)

Persepam	3–1	Cahaya Madura Muda
	Report

Gelora Bangkalan Stadium, Bangkalan
11 January 2025
15.00 WIB (UTC+7)

Persesa	1–0	Perseba
	Report

Gelora Bangkalan Stadium, Bangkalan

Matchday 5 (13 January 2025)
13 January 2025
13.00 WIB (UTC+7)

Perssu	0–0	Persesa
	Report

Gelora Bangkalan Stadium, Bangkalan
13 January 2025
15.00 WIB (UTC+7)

Perseba	4–0	Persepam

Gelora Bangkalan Stadium, Bangkalan

=== Group E ===
All matches will be held at Gelora Delta Stadium, Sidoarjo.

Pos	Team	Pld	W	D	L	GF	GA	GD	Pts	Qualification	MAE	PSD	AKO	GEN
1	Sang Maestro	3	2	1	0	8	0	+8	7	Qualification to the second round	—	—	0–0	—
2	Persida (H)	3	2	0	1	6	1	+5	6	Qualification to the second round	0–1	—	—	1–0
3	Akor	3	1	1	1	9	5	+4	4		—	0–5	—	9–0
4	Gen–B Mojokerto	3	0	0	3	0	17	−17	0		0–7	—	—	—

Source: Liga 4 East Java
Legend: Blue = home team win; Yellow = draw; Red = away team win.
Rules for classification: 1) Points; 2) Head-to-head points; 3) Head-to-head goal difference; 4) Head-to-head goals scored; 5) Goal difference; 6) Goals scored; 7) Fair-play points; 8) Draw.
(H) Hosts

Matches

Matchday 1 (6 January 2025)
6 January 2025
13.00 WIB (UTC+7)

Sang Maestro	0–0	Akor
	Report

Gelora Delta Stadium, Sidoarjo
6 January 2025
15.00 WIB (UTC+7)

Persida	1–0	Gen–B Mojokerto
	Report

Gelora Delta Stadium, Sidoarjo

Matchday 2 (8 January 2025)
8 January 2025
13.00 WIB (UTC+7)

Akor	0–5	Persida
	Report

Gelora Delta Stadium, Sidoarjo
8 January 2025
15.00 WIB (UTC+7)

Gen–B Mojokerto	0–7	Sang Maestro
	Report

Gelora Delta Stadium, Sidoarjo

Matchday 3 (9 January 2025)
9 January 2025
13.00 WIB (UTC+7)

Akor	9–0	Gen–B Mojokerto
	Report

Gelora Delta Stadium, Sidoarjo
9 January 2025
15.00 WIB (UTC+7)

Persida	0–1	Sang Maestro
	Report

Gelora Delta Stadium, Sidoarjo

=== Group F ===
All matches will be held at Jenggolo Stadium, Sidoarjo.

Pos	Team	Pld	W	D	L	GF	GA	GD	Pts	Qualification	KOT	SIN	MJK	PPK
1	PS Kota Pahlawan	3	3	0	0	18	0	+18	9	Qualification to the second round	—	—	6–0	—
2	Sinar Harapan (H)	3	2	0	1	14	3	+11	6	Qualification to the second round	0–2	—	—	8–1
3	Mojokerto	3	0	1	2	1	13	−12	1		—	0–6	—	1–1
4	PSPK	3	0	1	2	2	19	−17	1		0–10	—	—	—

Source: Liga 4 East Java
Legend: Blue = home team win; Yellow = draw; Red = away team win.
Rules for classification: 1) Points; 2) Head-to-head points; 3) Head-to-head goal difference; 4) Head-to-head goals scored; 5) Goal difference; 6) Goals scored; 7) Fair-play points; 8) Draw.
(H) Hosts

Matches

Matchday 1 (6 January 2025)
6 January 2025
13.00 WIB (UTC+7)

PS Kota Pahlawan	6–0	Mojokerto
	Report

Jenggolo Stadium, Sidoarjo
6 January 2025
15.00 WIB (UTC+7)

Sinar Harapan	8–1	PSPK
	Report

Jenggolo Stadium, Sidoarjo

Matchday 2 (8 January 2025)
8 January 2025
13.00 WIB (UTC+7)

Mojokerto	0–6	Sinar Harapan
	Report

Jenggolo Stadium, Sidoarjo
8 January 2025
15.00 WIB (UTC+7)

PSPK	0–10	PS Kota Pahlawan
	Report

Jenggolo Stadium, Sidoarjo

Matchday 3 (10 January 2025)
10 January 2025
13.15 WIB (UTC+7)

Mojokerto	1–1	PSPK
	Report

Jenggolo Stadium, Sidoarjo
10 January 2025
15.15 WIB (UTC+7)

Sinar Harapan	0–2	PS Kota Pahlawan
	Report

Jenggolo Stadium, Sidoarjo

=== Group G ===
All matches will be held at Jala Krida Mandala Field, Surabaya.

Pos	Team	Pld	W	D	L	GF	GA	GD	Pts	Qualification	MJS	ARE	BLA	SNC
1	Mojosari Putra	3	2	1	0	7	3	+4	7	Qualification to the second round	—	—	—	4–1
2	ArekMalang Indonesia	3	2	0	1	7	3	+4	6	Qualification to the second round	1–2	—	2–1	—
3	Blayu	3	1	1	1	7	4	+3	4		1–1	—	—	—
4	Suryanaga Connection (H)	3	0	0	3	2	13	−11	0		—	0–4	1–5	—

Source: Liga 4 East Java
Legend: Blue = home team win; Yellow = draw; Red = away team win.
Rules for classification: 1) Points; 2) Head-to-head points; 3) Head-to-head goal difference; 4) Head-to-head goals scored; 5) Goal difference; 6) Goals scored; 7) Fair-play points; 8) Draw.
(H) Hosts

Matches

Matchday 1 (12 January 2025)
12 January 2025
13.00 WIB (UTC+7)

Mojosari Putra	4–1	Suryanaga Connection
	Report

Jala Krida Mandala Field, Surabaya
12 January 2025
15.00 WIB (UTC+7)

ArekMalang Indonesia	2–1	Blayu
	Report

Jala Krida Mandala Field, Surabaya

Matchday 2 (14 January 2025)
14 January 2025
13.00 WIB (UTC+7)

Suryanaga Connection	0–4	ArekMalang Indonesia
	Report

Jala Krida Mandala Field, Surabaya
14 January 2025
15.00 WIB (UTC+7)

Blayu	1–1	Mojosari Putra
	Report

Jala Krida Mandala Field, Surabaya

Matchday 3 (15 January 2025)
15 January 2025
13.15 WIB (UTC+7)

Suryanaga Connection	1–5	Blayu
	Report

Jala Krida Mandala Field, Surabaya
15 January 2025
15.15 WIB (UTC+7)

ArekMalang Indonesia	1–2	Mojosari Putra
	Report

Jala Krida Mandala Field, Surabaya

=== Group H ===
All matches will be held at Brantas Stadium, Batu.

Pos	Team	Pld	W	D	L	GF	GA	GD	Pts	Qualification	KBA	PKM	BPT	PBK
1	Persikoba (H)	3	3	0	0	8	0	+8	9	Qualification to the second round	—	—	4–0	3–0
2	Persekam	3	2	0	1	6	2	+4	6	Qualification to the second round	0–1	—	2–1	—
3	Blitar Poetra	3	1	0	2	3	6	−3	3		—	—	—	2–0
4	PSBK	3	0	0	3	0	9	−9	0		—	0–4	—	—

Source: Liga 4 East Java
Legend: Blue = home team win; Yellow = draw; Red = away team win.
Rules for classification: 1) Points; 2) Head-to-head points; 3) Head-to-head goal difference; 4) Head-to-head goals scored; 5) Goal difference; 6) Goals scored; 7) Fair-play points; 8) Draw.
(H) Hosts

Matches

Matchday 1 (6 January 2025)
6 January 2025
13.00 WIB (UTC+7)

PSBK	0–4	Persekam
	Report

Brantas Stadium, Batu
6 January 2025
15.00 WIB (UTC+7)

Persikoba	4–0	Blitar Poetra
	Report

Brantas Stadium, Batu

Matchday 2 (8 January 2025)
8 January 2025
13.00 WIB (UTC+7)

Persekam	0–1	Persikoba
	Report

Brantas Stadium, Batu
8 January 2025
15.00 WIB (UTC+7)

Blitar Poetra	2–0	PSBK
	Report

Brantas Stadium, Batu

Matchday 3 (10 January 2025)
10 January 2025
13.15 WIB (UTC+7)

Persekam	2–1	Blitar Poetra
	Report

Brantas Stadium, Batu
10 January 2025
15.15 WIB (UTC+7)

Persikoba	3–0	PSBK
	Report

Brantas Stadium, Batu

=== Group I ===
All matches will be held at Jenggolo Stadium, Sidoarjo.

Pos	Team	Pld	W	D	L	GF	GA	GD	Pts	Qualification	PMP	PSD	PUN	ASY	SBY
1	PS Mojokerto Putra (H)	4	4	0	0	13	1	+12	12	Qualification to the second round	—	—	3–1	1–0	—
2	PSID	4	2	1	1	8	3	+5	7	Qualification to the second round	0–2	—	—	1–0	—
3	Pasuruan United	4	1	2	1	7	4	+3	5		—	1–1	—	—	5–0
4	Assyabaab Bangil	4	1	1	2	1	2	−1	4		—	—	0–0	—	1–0
5	Surabaya Muda	4	0	0	4	0	19	−19	0		0–7	0–6	—	—	—

Source: Liga 4 East Java
Legend: Blue = home team win; Yellow = draw; Red = away team win.
Rules for classification: 1) Points; 2) Head-to-head points; 3) Head-to-head goal difference; 4) Head-to-head goals scored; 5) Goal difference; 6) Goals scored; 7) Fair-play points; 8) Draw.
(H) Hosts

Matches

Matchday 1 (5–6 January 2025)
5 January 2025
15.00 WIB (UTC+7)

Pasuruan United	5–0	Surabaya Muda
	Report

Jenggolo Stadium, Sidoarjo
6 January 2025 (Note: The PSID vs Assyabaab Bangil match was originally scheduled to be played on 5 January 2025 at 13:00 WIB in Jenggolo Stadium, but was postponed due to bad weather and rescheduled to be held on 6 January 2025 at 08:00 WIB.)
08.00 WIB (UTC+7)

PSID	1–0	Assyabaab Bangil
	Report

Jenggolo Stadium, Sidoarjo

Matchday 2 (7 January 2025)
7 January 2025
13.00 WIB (UTC+7)

Surabaya Muda	0–7	PS Mojokerto Putra
	Report

Jenggolo Stadium, Sidoarjo
7 January 2025
15.00 WIB (UTC+7)

Pasuruan United	1–1	PSID
	Report

Jenggolo Stadium, Sidoarjo

Matchday 3 (9 January 2025)
9 January 2025
13.00 WIB (UTC+7)

PS Mojokerto Putra	3–1	Pasuruan United

Jenggolo Stadium, Sidoarjo
9 January 2025
15.00 WIB (UTC+7)

Assyabaab Bangil	1–0	Surabaya Muda
	Report

Jenggolo Stadium, Sidoarjo

Matchday 4 (11 January 2025)
11 January 2025
13.00 WIB (UTC+7)

Assyabaab Bangil	0–0	Pasuruan United
	Report

Jenggolo Stadium, Sidoarjo
11 January 2025
15.00 WIB (UTC+7)

PSID	0–2	PS Mojokerto Putra
	Report

Jenggolo Stadium, Sidoarjo

Matchday 5 (13 January 2025)
13 January 2025
13.00 WIB (UTC+7)

Surabaya Muda	0–6	PSID
	Report

Jenggolo Stadium, Sidoarjo
13 January 2025
15.00 WIB (UTC+7)

PS Mojokerto Putra	1–0	Assyabaab Bangil

Jenggolo Stadium, Sidoarjo

=== Group J ===
All matches will be held at Rondo Kuning Field, Kediri.

Pos	Team	Pld	W	D	L	GF	GA	GD	Pts	Qualification	TRI	MUN	ASI	FCP
1	Triple'S Kediri (H)	3	3	0	0	10	2	+8	9	Qualification to the second round	—	2–1	—	3–0
2	Malang United	3	2	0	1	5	2	+3	6	Qualification to the second round	—	—	—	3–0
3	ASIFA	3	1	0	2	2	6	−4	3		1–5	0–1	—	—
4	FC Pare	3	0	0	3	0	7	−7	0		—	—	0–1	—

Source: Liga 4 East Java
Legend: Blue = home team win; Yellow = draw; Red = away team win.
Rules for classification: 1) Points; 2) Head-to-head points; 3) Head-to-head goal difference; 4) Head-to-head goals scored; 5) Goal difference; 6) Goals scored; 7) Fair-play points; 8) Draw.
(H) Hosts

Matches

Matchday 1 (6 January 2025)
6 January 2025
13.00 WIB (UTC+7)

FC Pare	0–1	ASIFA
	Report

Rondo Kuning Field, Kediri
6 January 2025
15.00 WIB (UTC+7)

Triple'S Kediri	2–1	Malang United
	Report

Rondo Kuning Field, Kediri

Matchday 2 (8 January 2025)
8 January 2025
13.00 WIB (UTC+7)

ASIFA	1–5	Triple'S Kediri
	Report

Rondo Kuning Field, Kediri
8 January 2025
15.00 WIB (UTC+7)

Malang United	3–0	FC Pare
	Report

Rondo Kuning Field, Kediri

Matchday 3 (10 January 2025)
10 January 2025
13.15 WIB (UTC+7)

ASIFA	0–1	Malang United
	Report

Rondo Kuning Field, Kediri
10 January 2025
15.15 WIB (UTC+7)

Triple'S Kediri	3–0	FC Pare
	Report

Rondo Kuning Field, Kediri

=== Group K ===
All matches will be held at Canda Bhirawa Stadium, Kediri.

Pos	Team	Pld	W	D	L	GF	GA	GD	Pts	Qualification	PDK	NGA	PKM	PGA
1	Persedikab (H)	3	2	1	0	10	4	+6	7	Qualification to the second round	—	1–1	5–2	—
2	Persenga	3	2	1	0	6	2	+4	7	Qualification to the second round	—	—	—	3–1
3	Persekama	3	0	1	2	4	9	−5	1		—	0–2	—	—
4	Persiga	3	0	1	2	4	9	−5	1		1–4	—	2–2	—

Source: Liga 4 East Java
Legend: Blue = home team win; Yellow = draw; Red = away team win.
Rules for classification: 1) Points; 2) Head-to-head points; 3) Head-to-head goal difference; 4) Head-to-head goals scored; 5) Goal difference; 6) Goals scored; 7) Fair-play points; 8) Draw.
(H) Hosts

Matches

Matchday 1 (6 January 2025)
6 January 2025
13.00 WIB (UTC+7)

Persenga	3–1	Persiga
	Report

Canda Bhirawa Stadium, Kediri
6 January 2025
15.00 WIB (UTC+7)

Persedikab	5–2	Persekama
	Report

Canda Bhirawa Stadium, Kediri

Matchday 2 (8 January 2025)
8 January 2025
13.00 WIB (UTC+7)

Persiga	1–4	Persedikab
	Report

Canda Bhirawa Stadium, Kediri
8 January 2025
15.00 WIB (UTC+7)

Persekama	0–2	Persenga
	Report

Canda Bhirawa Stadium, Kediri

Matchday 3 (10 January 2025)
10 January 2025
13.15 WIB (UTC+7)

Persiga	2–2	Persekama
	Report

Canda Bhirawa Stadium, Kediri
10 January 2025
15.15 WIB (UTC+7)

Persedikab	1–1	Persenga
	Report

Canda Bhirawa Stadium, Kediri

=== Group L ===
All matches will be held at Brawijaya Stadium, Kediri.

Pos	Team	Pld	W	D	L	GF	GA	GD	Pts	Qualification	INT	BFC	BRY	NEA
1	Inter Kediri (H)	3	2	1	0	11	0	+11	7	Qualification to the second round	—	0–0	5–0	—
2	Bojonegoro	3	2	1	0	8	1	+7	7	Qualification to the second round	—	—	3–0	—
3	PS Blitar Raya	3	1	0	2	4	8	−4	3		—	—	—	4–0
4	Naga Emas Asri	3	0	0	3	1	15	−14	0		0–6	1–5	—	—

Source: Liga 4 East Java
Legend: Blue = home team win; Yellow = draw; Red = away team win.
Rules for classification: 1) Points; 2) Head-to-head points; 3) Head-to-head goal difference; 4) Head-to-head goals scored; 5) Goal difference; 6) Goals scored; 7) Fair-play points; 8) Draw.
(H) Hosts

Matches

Matchday 1 (6 January 2025)
6 January 2025
13.00 WIB (UTC+7)

PS Blitar Raya	4–0	Naga Emas Asri
	Report

Brawijaya Stadium, Kediri
6 January 2025
15.00 WIB (UTC+7)

Inter Kediri	0–0	Bojonegoro
	Report

Brawijaya Stadium, Kediri

Matchday 2 (8 January 2025)
8 January 2025
13.00 WIB (UTC+7)

Naga Emas Asri	0–6	Inter Kediri
	Report

Brawijaya Stadium, Kediri
8 January 2025
15.00 WIB (UTC+7)

Bojonegoro	3–0	PS Blitar Raya
	Report

Brawijaya Stadium, Kediri

Matchday 3 (10 January 2025)
10 January 2025
13.15 WIB (UTC+7)

Naga Emas Asri	1–5	Bojonegoro
	Report

Brawijaya Stadium, Kediri
10 January 2025
15.15 WIB (UTC+7)

Inter Kediri	5–0	PS Blitar Raya
	Report

Brawijaya Stadium, Kediri

=== Group M ===
All matches will be held at Gelora Bung Sumardji Stadium, Nganjuk.

Pos	Team	Pld	W	D	L	GF	GA	GD	Pts	Qualification	NLD	NFC	LFC	BUM
1	Nganjuk Ladang (H)	3	3	0	0	5	0	+5	9	Qualification to the second round	—	1–0	2–0	—
2	Ngawi	3	2	0	1	2	3	−1	6	Qualification to the second round	—	—	—	2–0
3	Lamongan	3	0	1	2	3	3	0	1		—	0–2	—	—
4	Bumi Wali	3	0	1	2	1	5	−4	1		0–2	—	1–1	—

Source: Liga 4 East Java
Legend: Blue = home team win; Yellow = draw; Red = away team win.
Rules for classification: 1) Points; 2) Head-to-head points; 3) Head-to-head goal difference; 4) Head-to-head goals scored; 5) Goal difference; 6) Goals scored; 7) Fair-play points; 8) Draw.
(H) Hosts

Matches

Matchday 1 (6 January 2025)
6 January 2025
13.00 WIB (UTC+7)

Ngawi	2–0	Bumi Wali
	Report

Gelora Bung Sumardji Stadium, Nganjuk
6 January 2025
15.00 WIB (UTC+7)

Nganjuk Ladang	2–0	Lamongan
	Report

Gelora Bung Sumardji Stadium, Nganjuk

Matchday 2 (8 January 2025)
8 January 2025
13.00 WIB (UTC+7)

Bumi Wali	0–2	Nganjuk Ladang
	Report

Gelora Bung Sumardji Stadium, Nganjuk
8 January 2025
15.00 WIB (UTC+7)

Lamongan	0–2	Ngawi
	Report

Gelora Bung Sumardji Stadium, Nganjuk

Matchday 3 (10 January 2025)
10 January 2025
13.15 WIB (UTC+7)

Bumi Wali	1–1	Lamongan
	Report

Gelora Bung Sumardji Stadium, Nganjuk
10 January 2025
15.15 WIB (UTC+7)

Nganjuk Ladang	1–0	Ngawi
	Report

Gelora Bung Sumardji Stadium, Nganjuk

=== Group N ===
All matches will be held at Semen Gresik Stadium, Gresik.

Pos	Team	Pld	W	D	L	GF	GA	GD	Pts	Qualification	USA	GRS	SEM	BJL
1	UNESA	3	3	0	0	8	1	+7	9	Qualification to the second round	—	3–1	—	—
2	Persegres Putra (H)	3	2	0	1	8	4	+4	6	Qualification to the second round	—	—	—	4–0
3	Persem	3	1	0	2	5	10	−5	3		0–4	1–3	—	—
4	Bajul Ijo	3	0	0	3	3	9	−6	0		0–1	—	3–4	—

Source: Liga 4 East Java
Legend: Blue = home team win; Yellow = draw; Red = away team win.
Rules for classification: 1) Points; 2) Head-to-head points; 3) Head-to-head goal difference; 4) Head-to-head goals scored; 5) Goal difference; 6) Goals scored; 7) Fair-play points; 8) Draw.
(H) Hosts

Matches

Matchday 1 (6 January 2025)
6 January 2025
13.00 WIB (UTC+7)

Persegres Putra	4–0	Bajul Ijo
	Report

Semen Gresik Stadium, Gresik
6 January 2025
15.00 WIB (UTC+7)

Persem	0–4	UNESA
	Report

Semen Gresik Stadium, Gresik

Matchday 2 (8 January 2025)
8 January 2025
13.00 WIB (UTC+7)

Bajul Ijo	3–4	Persem
	Report

Semen Gresik Stadium, Gresik
8 January 2025
15.00 WIB (UTC+7)

UNESA	3–1	Persegres Putra
	Report

Semen Gresik Stadium, Gresik

Matchday 3 (10 January 2025)
10 January 2025
13.15 WIB (UTC+7)

Bajul Ijo	0–1	UNESA
	Report

Semen Gresik Stadium, Gresik
10 January 2025
15.15 WIB (UTC+7)

Persem	1–3	Persegres Putra
	Report

Semen Gresik Stadium, Gresik

=== Group O ===
All matches will be held at Dirgantara Abdulrachman Saleh Stadium, Malang.

Pos	Team	Pld	W	D	L	GF	GA	GD	Pts	Qualification	PMA	ACM	PTA	HIZ
1	Persema (H)	3	3	0	0	4	0	+4	9	Qualification to the second round	—	—	1–0	2–0
2	AC Majapahit	3	1	1	1	4	4	0	4	Qualification to the second round	0–1	—	—	2–1
3	Perseta 1970	3	0	2	1	2	3	−1	2		—	2–2	—	—
4	Hizbul Wathan	3	0	1	2	1	4	−3	1		—	—	0–0	—

Updated to match(es) played on 10 January 2025. Source: Liga 4 East Java
Legend: Blue = home team win; Yellow = draw; Red = away team win.
Rules for classification: 1) Points; 2) Head-to-head points; 3) Head-to-head goal difference; 4) Head-to-head goals scored; 5) Goal difference; 6) Goals scored; 7) Fair-play points; 8) Draw.
(H) Hosts

Matches

Matchday 1 (6 January 2025)
6 January 2025
13.00 WIB (UTC+7)

Perseta 1970	2–2	AC Majapahit
	Report

Dirgantara Abdulrachman Saleh Stadium, Malang
6 January 2025
15.00 WIB (UTC+7)

Persema	2–0	Hizbul Wathan
	Report

Dirgantara Abdulrachman Saleh Stadium, Malang

Matchday 2 (8 January 2025)
8 January 2025
13.00 WIB (UTC+7)

AC Majapahit	0–1	Persema
	Report

Dirgantara Abdulrachman Saleh Stadium, Malang
8 January 2025
15.00 WIB (UTC+7)

Hizbul Wathan	0–0	Perseta 1970
	Report

Dirgantara Abdulrachman Saleh Stadium, Malang

Matchday 3 (10 January 2025)
10 January 2025
13.15 WIB (UTC+7)

AC Majapahit	2–1	Hizbul Wathan
	Report

Dirgantara Abdulrachman Saleh Stadium, Malang
10 January 2025
15.15 WIB (UTC+7)

Persema	1–0	Perseta 1970
	Report

Dirgantara Abdulrachman Saleh Stadium, Malang

=== Group P ===
All matches will be held at Batoro Katong Stadium, Ponorogo.

Pos	Team	Pld	W	D	L	GF	GA	GD	Pts	Qualification	PON	NGA	PPA	PHW
1	Persepon (H)	3	3	0	0	7	1	+6	9	Qualification to the second round	—	3–1	—	3–0
2	Persinga	3	2	0	1	3	3	0	6	Qualification to the second round	—	—	—	1–0
3	Perspa	3	0	1	2	0	2	−2	1		0–1	0–1	—	—
4	PSHW	3	0	1	2	0	4	−4	1		—	—	0–0	—

Source: Liga 4 East Java
Legend: Blue = home team win; Yellow = draw; Red = away team win.
Rules for classification: 1) Points; 2) Head-to-head points; 3) Head-to-head goal difference; 4) Head-to-head goals scored; 5) Goal difference; 6) Goals scored; 7) Fair-play points; 8) Draw.
(H) Hosts

Matches

Matchday 1 (6 January 2025)
6 January 2025
13.00 WIB (UTC+7)

PSHW	0–0	Perspa
	Report

Batoro Katong Stadium, Ponorogo
6 January 2025
15.00 WIB (UTC+7)

Persepon	3–1	Persinga
	Report

Batoro Katong Stadium, Ponorogo

Matchday 2 (8 January 2025)
8 January 2025
13.00 WIB (UTC+7)

Perspa	0–1	Persepon
	Report

Batoro Katong Stadium, Ponorogo
8 January 2025
15.00 WIB (UTC+7)

Persinga	1–0	PSHW
	Report

Batoro Katong Stadium, Ponorogo

Matchday 3 (10 January 2025)
10 January 2025
13.15 WIB (UTC+7)

Perspa	0–1	Persinga
	Report

Batoro Katong Stadium, Ponorogo
10 January 2025
15.15 WIB (UTC+7)

Persepon	3–0	PSHW

Batoro Katong Stadium, Ponorogo

== Second round ==
The 32 teams that qualify from the first round will be drawn into 8 groups of four. The second round will be played in a home tournament format of single round-robin matches.

The top two teams of each group will qualify for the third round.

=== Group AA ===
All matches will be held at Diponegoro Stadium, Banyuwangi.

Pos	Team	Pld	W	D	L	GF	GA	GD	Pts	Qualification	PWG	PBO	PSD	PSA
1	Persewangi (H)	3	2	1	0	4	1	+3	7	Qualification to the Third round	—	3–1	—	0–0
2	Persebo 1964	3	1	1	1	5	4	+1	4	Qualification to the Third round	—	—	1–1	—
3	Persid	3	1	1	1	4	3	+1	4		0–1	—	—	3–1
4	Persesa	3	0	1	2	1	6	−5	1		—	0–3	—	—

Source: Liga 4 East Java
Legend: Blue = home team win; Yellow = draw; Red = away team win.
Rules for classification: 1) Points; 2) Head-to-head points; 3) Head-to-head goal difference; 4) Head-to-head goals scored; 5) Goal difference; 6) Goals scored; 7) Fair-play points; 8) Draw.
(H) Hosts

Matches

Matchday 1 (20 January 2025)
20 January 2025
13.00 WIB (UTC+7)

Persebo 1964	1–1	Persid
	Report

Diponegoro Stadium, Banyuwangi
20 January 2025
15.00 WIB (UTC+7)

Persewangi	0–0	Persesa
	Report

Diponegoro Stadium, Banyuwangi

Matchday 2 (22 January 2025)
22 January 2025
13.00 WIB (UTC+7)

Persesa	0–3	Persebo 1964
	Report

Diponegoro Stadium, Banyuwangi
22 January 2025
15.00 WIB (UTC+7)

Persid	0–1	Persewangi
	Report

Diponegoro Stadium, Banyuwangi

Matchday 3 (24 January 2025)
24 January 2025
13.15 WIB (UTC+7)

Persid	3–1	Persesa
	Report

Diponegoro Stadium, Banyuwangi
24 January 2025
15.15 WIB (UTC+7)

Persewangi	3–1	Persebo 1964
	Report

Diponegoro Stadium, Banyuwangi

=== Group BB ===
All matches will be held at Bima Sakti Field, Banyuwangi.

Pos	Team	Pld	W	D	L	GF	GA	GD	Pts	Qualification	BPT	MTR	PRO	PSU
1	Banyuwangi Putra	3	2	1	0	6	1	+5	7	Qualifiction to the Third round	—	—	—	3–0
2	Mitra Surabaya (H)	3	1	2	0	6	2	+4	5	Qualifiction to the Third round	0–0	—	1–1	—
3	Persipro 1954	3	1	1	1	4	5	−1	4		1–3	—	—	—
4	Perssu	3	0	0	3	2	10	−8	0		—	1–5	1–2	—

Source: Liga 4 East Java
Legend: Blue = home team win; Yellow = draw; Red = away team win.
Rules for classification: 1) Points; 2) Head-to-head points; 3) Head-to-head goal difference; 4) Head-to-head goals scored; 5) Goal difference; 6) Goals scored; 7) Fair-play points; 8) Draw.
(H) Hosts

Matches

Matchday 1 (21 January 2025)
21 January 2025
13.00 WIB (UTC+7)

Banyuwangi Putra	3–0	Perssu
	Report

Bima Sakti Field, Banyuwangi
21 January 2025
15.00 WIB (UTC+7)

Mitra Surabaya	1–1	Persipro 1954
	Report

Bima Sakti Field, Banyuwangi

Matchday 2 (23 January 2025)
23 January 2025
13.00 WIB (UTC+7)

Persipro 1954	1–3	Banyuwangi Putra
	Report

Bima Sakti Field, Banyuwangi
23 January 2025
15.00 WIB (UTC+7)

Perssu	1–5	Mitra Surabaya
	Report

Bima Sakti Field, Banyuwangi

Matchday 3 (25 January 2025)
25 January 2025
13.00 WIB (UTC+7)

Perssu	1–2	Persipro 1954
	Report

Bima Sakti Field, Banyuwangi
25 January 2025
15.00 WIB (UTC+7)

Mitra Surabaya	0–0	Banyuwangi Putra
	Report

Bima Sakti Field, Banyuwangi

=== Group CC ===
All matches will be held at Jenggolo Stadium, Sidoarjo.

Pos	Team	Pld	W	D	L	GF	GA	GD	Pts	Qualification	MAE	MJS	SIN	PKM
1	Sang Maestro	3	3	0	0	12	0	+12	9	Qualifiction to the Third round	—	—	6–0	5–0
2	Mojosari Putra	3	2	0	1	6	2	+4	6	Qualifiction to the Third round	0–1	—	—	4–1
3	Sinar Harapan (H)	3	1	0	2	1	8	−7	3		—	0–2	—	—
4	Persekam	3	0	0	3	1	10	−9	0		—	—	0–1	—

Source: Liga 4 East Java
Legend: Blue = home team win; Yellow = draw; Red = away team win.
Rules for classification: 1) Points; 2) Head-to-head points; 3) Head-to-head goal difference; 4) Head-to-head goals scored; 5) Goal difference; 6) Goals scored; 7) Fair-play points; 8) Draw.
(H) Hosts

Matches

Matchday 1 (20 January 2025)
20 January 2025
13.00 WIB (UTC+7)

Sang Maestro	5–0	Persekam
	Report

Jenggolo Stadium, Sidoarjo
20 January 2025
15.00 WIB (UTC+7)

Sinar Harapan	0–2	Mojosari Putra
	Report

Jenggolo Stadium, Sidoarjo

Matchday 2 (22 January 2025)
22 January 2025
13.00 WIB (UTC+7)

Mojosari Putra	0–1	Sang Maestro
	Report

Jenggolo Stadium, Sidoarjo
22 January 2025
15.00 WIB (UTC+7)

Persekam	0–1	Sinar Harapan
	Report

Jenggolo Stadium, Sidoarjo

Matchday 3 (23 January 2025)
23 January 2025
13.00 WIB (UTC+7)

Mojosari Putra	4–1	Persekam
	Report

Jenggolo Stadium, Sidoarjo
23 January 2025
15.00 WIB (UTC+7)

Sang Maestro	6–0	Sinar Harapan
	Report

Jenggolo Stadium, Sidoarjo

=== Group DD ===
All matches will be held at Brantas Stadium, Batu.

Pos	Team	Pld	W	D	L	GF	GA	GD	Pts	Qualification	KBA	ARE	KOT	PSD
1	Persikoba (H)	3	3	0	0	4	0	+4	9	Qualifiction to the Third round	—	1–0	2–0	—
2	ArekMalang Indonesia	3	1	1	1	4	2	+2	4	Qualifiction to the Third round	—	—	—	3–0
3	PS Kota Pahlawan	3	1	1	1	4	3	+1	4		—	1–1	—	3–0
4	Persida	3	0	0	3	0	7	−7	0		0–1	—	—	—

Source: Liga 4 East Java
Legend: Blue = home team win; Yellow = draw; Red = away team win.
Rules for classification: 1) Points; 2) Head-to-head points; 3) Head-to-head goal difference; 4) Head-to-head goals scored; 5) Goal difference; 6) Goals scored; 7) Fair-play points; 8) Draw.
(H) Hosts

Matches

Matchday 1 (20 January 2025)
20 January 2025
13.00 WIB (UTC+7)

PS Kota Pahlawan	1–1	ArekMalang Indonesia
	Report

Brantas Stadium, Batu
20 January 2025
15.00 WIB (UTC+7)

Persida	0–1	Persikoba
	Report

Brantas Stadium, Batu

Matchday 2 (22 January 2025)
22 January 2025
13.00 WIB (UTC+7)

ArekMalang Indonesia	3–0	Persida
	Report

Brantas Stadium, Batu
22 January 2025
15.00 WIB (UTC+7)

Persikoba	2–0	PS Kota Pahlawan
	Report

Brantas Stadium, Batu

Matchday 3 (24 January 2025)
24 January 2025
13.15 WIB (UTC+7)

PS Kota Pahlawan	3–0	Persida
	Report

Brantas Stadium, Batu
24 January 2025
15.15 WIB (UTC+7)

Persikoba	1–0	ArekMalang Indonesia
	Report

Brantas Stadium, Batu

=== Group EE ===
All matches will be held at Canda Bhirawa Stadium, Kediri.

Pos	Team	Pld	W	D	L	GF	GA	GD	Pts	Qualification	PDK	PMP	BFC	MUN
1	Persedikab (H)	3	2	0	1	7	3	+4	6	Qualifiction to the Third round	—	2–1	1–2	—
2	PS Mojokerto Putra	3	1	1	1	10	4	+6	4 (Note: Ranked on head-to-head points: PS Mojokerto Putra 3, Bojonegoro 0.)	Qualifiction to the Third round	—	—	7–0	2–2
3	Bojonegoro	3	1	1	1	5	11	−6	4		—	—	—	3–3
4	Malang United	3	0	2	1	5	9	−4	2		0–4	—	—	—

Source: Liga 4 East Java
Legend: Blue = home team win; Yellow = draw; Red = away team win.
Rules for classification: 1) Points; 2) Head-to-head points; 3) Head-to-head goal difference; 4) Head-to-head goals scored; 5) Goal difference; 6) Goals scored; 7) Fair-play points; 8) Draw.
(H) Hosts
Notes:

Matches

Matchday 1 (20 January 2025)
20 January 2025
13.00 WIB (UTC+7)

PS Mojokerto Putra	7–0	Bojonegoro
	Report

Canda Bhirawa Stadium, Kediri
20 January 2025
15.00 WIB (UTC+7)

Malang United	0–4	Persedikab
	Report

Canda Bhirawa Stadium, Kediri

Matchday 2 (22 January 2025)
22 January 2025
13.00 WIB (UTC+7)

Bojonegoro	3–3	Malang United
	Report

Canda Bhirawa Stadium, Kediri
22 January 2025
15.00 WIB (UTC+7)

Persedikab	2–1	PS Mojokerto Putra
	Report

Canda Bhirawa Stadium, Kediri

Matchday 3 (24 January 2025)
24 January 2025
13.15 WIB (UTC+7)

PS Mojokerto Putra	2–2	Malang United
	Report

Canda Bhirawa Stadium, Kediri
24 January 2025
15.15 WIB (UTC+7)

Persedikab	1–2	Bojonegoro
	Report

Canda Bhirawa Stadium, Kediri

=== Group FF ===
All matches will be held at Brawijaya Stadium, Kediri.

Pos	Team	Pld	W	D	L	GF	GA	GD	Pts	Qualification	INT	NGA	TRI	PSD
1	Inter Kediri (H)	3	2	1	0	5	3	+2	7	Qualifiction to the Third round	—	1–1	2–1	—
2	Persenga	3	1	2	0	4	2	+2	5	Qualifiction to the Third round	—	—	—	2–0
3	Triple'S Kediri	3	1	1	1	7	3	+4	4		—	1–1	—	5–0
4	PSID	3	0	0	3	1	9	−8	0		1–2	—	—	—

Source: Liga 4 East Java
Legend: Blue = home team win; Yellow = draw; Red = away team win.
Rules for classification: 1) Points; 2) Head-to-head points; 3) Head-to-head goal difference; 4) Head-to-head goals scored; 5) Goal difference; 6) Goals scored; 7) Fair-play points; 8) Draw.
(H) Hosts

Matches

Matchday 1 (20 January 2025)
20 January 2025
13.00 WIB (UTC+7)

Triple'S Kediri	1–1	Persenga
	Report

Brawijaya Stadium, Kediri
20 January 2025
15.00 WIB (UTC+7)

PSID	1–2	Inter Kediri
	Report

Brawijaya Stadium, Kediri

Matchday 2 (22 January 2025)
22 January 2025
13.00 WIB (UTC+7)

Persenga	2–0	PSID
	Report

Brawijaya Stadium, Kediri
22 January 2025
15.00 WIB (UTC+7)

Inter Kediri	2–1	Triple'S Kediri
	Report

Brawijaya Stadium, Kediri

Matchday 3 (24 January 2025)
24 January 2025
13.15 WIB (UTC+7)

Triple'S Kediri	5–0	PSID
	Report

Brawijaya Stadium, Kediri
24 January 2025
15.15 WIB (UTC+7)

Inter Kediri	1–1	Persenga
	Report

Brawijaya Stadium, Kediri

=== Group GG ===
All matches will be held at Gelora Bung Sumardji Stadium, Nganjuk.

Pos	Team	Pld	W	D	L	GF	GA	GD	Pts	Qualification	PGA	PMA	NLD	GRS
1	Persinga	3	2	1	0	8	4	+4	7	Qualifiction to the Third round	—	—	—	3–0
2	Persema	3	2	0	1	10	5	+5	6	Qualifiction to the Third round	1–2	—	4–3	—
3	Nganjuk Ladang (H)	3	1	1	1	13	8	+5	4		3–3	—	—	7–1
4	Persegres Putra	3	0	0	3	1	15	−14	0		—	0–5	—	—

Source: Liga 4 East Java
Legend: Blue = home team win; Yellow = draw; Red = away team win.
Rules for classification: 1) Points; 2) Head-to-head points; 3) Head-to-head goal difference; 4) Head-to-head goals scored; 5) Goal difference; 6) Goals scored; 7) Fair-play points; 8) Draw.
(H) Hosts

Matches

Matchday 1 (20 January 2025)
20 January 2025
13.00 WIB (UTC+7)

Persegres Putra	0–5	Persema
	Report

Gelora Bung Sumardji Stadium, Nganjuk
20 January 2025
15.00 WIB (UTC+7)

Nganjuk Ladang	3–3	Persinga
	Report

Gelora Bung Sumardji Stadium, Nganjuk

Matchday 2 (22 January 2025)
22 January 2025
13.00 WIB (UTC+7)

Persinga	3–0	Persegres Putra
	Report

Gelora Bung Sumardji Stadium, Nganjuk
22 January 2025
15.00 WIB (UTC+7)

Persema	4–3	Nganjuk Ladang
	Report

Gelora Bung Sumardji Stadium, Nganjuk

Matchday 3 (24 January 2025)
24 January 2025
13.15 WIB (UTC+7)

Persema	1–2	Persinga
	Report

Gelora Bung Sumardji Stadium, Nganjuk
24 January 2025
15.15 WIB (UTC+7)

Nganjuk Ladang	7–1	Persegres Putra
	Report

Gelora Bung Sumardji Stadium, Nganjuk

=== Group HH ===
All matches will be held at Batoro Katong Stadium, Ponorogo.

Pos	Team	Pld	W	D	L	GF	GA	GD	Pts	Qualification	PON	USA	ACM	NFC
1	Persepon (H)	3	3	0	0	6	0	+6	9	Qualifiction to the Third round	—	1–0	4–0	—
2	UNESA	3	2	0	1	8	5	+3	6	Qualifiction to the Third round	—	—	6–3	2–1
3	AC Majapahit	3	1	0	2	7	10	−3	3		—	—	—	4–0
4	Ngawi	3	0	0	3	1	7	−6	0		0–1	—	—	—

Source: Liga 4 East Java
Legend: Blue = home team win; Yellow = draw; Red = away team win.
Rules for classification: 1) Points; 2) Head-to-head points; 3) Head-to-head goal difference; 4) Head-to-head goals scored; 5) Goal difference; 6) Goals scored; 7) Fair-play points; 8) Draw.
(H) Hosts

Matches

Matchday 1 (20 January 2025)
20 January 2025
13.00 WIB (UTC+7)

UNESA	6–3	AC Majapahit
	Report

Batoro Katong Stadium, Ponorogo
20 January 2025
15.00 WIB (UTC+7)

Ngawi	0–1	Persepon
	Report

Batoro Katong Stadium, Ponorogo

Matchday 2 (22 January 2025)
22 January 2025
13.00 WIB (UTC+7)

AC Majapahit	4–0	Ngawi
	Report

Batoro Katong Stadium, Ponorogo
22 January 2025
15.00 WIB (UTC+7)

Persepon	1–0	UNESA
	Report

Batoro Katong Stadium, Ponorogo

Matchday 3 (24 January 2025)
24 January 2025
13.15 WIB (UTC+7)

UNESA	2–1	Ngawi
	Report

Batoro Katong Stadium, Ponorogo
24 January 2025
15.15 WIB (UTC+7)

Persepon	4–0	AC Majapahit
	Report

Batoro Katong Stadium, Ponorogo

== Third round ==
The 16 teams that qualify from the second round will be drawn into 4 groups of four. The third round will be played in a home tournament format of single round-robin matches.

The top two teams of each group will qualify for the fourth round and national phase.

=== Group II ===
All matches will be held at Diponegoro Stadium, Banyuwangi.

Pos	Team	Pld	W	D	L	GF	GA	GD	Pts	Qualification	MTR	PWG	PDK	NGA
1	Mitra Surabaya	3	1	2	0	4	1	+3	5	Qualifiction to the Fourth round & National phase	—	—	1–1	—
2	Persewangi (H)	3	1	2	0	2	1	+1	5	Qualifiction to the Fourth round & National phase	0–0	—	—	0–0
3	Persedikab	3	1	1	1	6	4	+2	4		—	1–2	—	4–1
4	Persenga	3	0	1	2	1	7	−6	1		0–3	—	—	—

Source: Liga 4 East Java
Legend: Blue = home team win; Yellow = draw; Red = away team win.
Rules for classification: 1) Points; 2) Head-to-head points; 3) Head-to-head goal difference; 4) Head-to-head goals scored; 5) Goal difference; 6) Goals scored; 7) Fair-play points; 8) Draw.
(H) Hosts

Matches

Matchday 1 (31 January 2025)
31 January 2025
13.15 WIB (UTC+7)

Mitra Surabaya	1–1	Persedikab
	Report

Diponegoro Stadium, Banyuwangi
31 January 2025
15.15 WIB (UTC+7)

Persewangi	0–0	Persenga
	Report

Diponegoro Stadium, Banyuwangi

Matchday 2 (2 February 2025)
2 February 2025
13.00 WIB (UTC+7)

Persenga	0–3	Mitra Surabaya
https://www.instagram.com/p/DFkBlqhzIUC/?igsh=MWY0dGZwbXc2bG5wOQ==

Diponegoro Stadium, Banyuwangi
2 February 2025
15.00 WIB (UTC+7)

Persedikab	1–2	Persewangi
https://www.instagram.com/p/DFkQWbMTx_T/?igsh=MTdwNjF2bzR2NW1xaQ==

Diponegoro Stadium, Banyuwangi

Matchday 3 (4 February 2025)
4 February 2025
13.00 WIB (UTC+7)

Persedikab	4–1	Persenga
	Report

Diponegoro Stadium, Banyuwangi
4 February 2025
15.00 WIB (UTC+7)

Persewangi	0–0	Mitra Surabaya
	Report

Diponegoro Stadium, Banyuwangi

=== Group JJ ===
All matches will be held at Brawijaya Stadium, Kediri.

Pos	Team	Pld	W	D	L	GF	GA	GD	Pts	Qualification	PMP	INT	BPT	PBO
1	PS Mojokerto Putra	3	2	0	1	6	3	+3	6	Qualifiction to the Fourth round & National phase	—	—	—	4–0
2	Inter Kediri (H)	3	1	2	0	4	2	+2	5	Qualifiction to the Fourth round & National phase	2–0	—	1–1	—
3	Banyuwangi Putra	3	1	1	1	3	3	0	4		1–2	—	—	1–0
4	Persebo 1964	3	0	1	2	1	6	−5	1		—	1–1	—	—

Source: Liga 4 East Java
Legend: Blue = home team win; Yellow = draw; Red = away team win.
Rules for classification: 1) Points; 2) Head-to-head points; 3) Head-to-head goal difference; 4) Head-to-head goals scored; 5) Goal difference; 6) Goals scored; 7) Fair-play points; 8) Draw.
(H) Hosts

Matches

Matchday 1 (1 February 2025)
1 February 2025
13.00 WIB (UTC+7)

Banyuwangi Putra	1–2	PS Mojokerto Putra
	Report

Brawijaya Stadium, Kediri
1 February 2025
15.00 WIB (UTC+7)

Persebo 1964	1–1	Inter Kediri
	Report

Brawijaya Stadium, Kediri

Matchday 2 (3 February 2025)
3 February 2025
13.00 WIB (UTC+7)

PS Mojokerto Putra	4–0	Persebo 1964
	Report

Brawijaya Stadium, Kediri
3 February 2025
15.00 WIB (UTC+7)

Inter Kediri	1–1	Banyuwangi Putra
	Report

Brawijaya Stadium, Kediri

Matchday 3 (5 February 2025)
5 February 2025
13.00 WIB (UTC+7)

Banyuwangi Putra	1–0	Persebo 1964
https://www.instagram.com/p/DFr_CRjzRTq/?igsh=MTl2b2drcHlsOHY0MA==

Brawijaya Stadium, Kediri
5 February 2025
15.00 WIB (UTC+7)

Inter Kediri	2–0	PS Mojokerto Putra
https://www.instagram.com/p/DFr_CRjzRTq/?igsh=MTl2b2drcHlsOHY0MA==

Brawijaya Stadium, Kediri

=== Group KK ===
All matches will be held at Ketonggo Stadium, Ngawi.

Pos	Team	Pld	W	D	L	GF	GA	GD	Pts	Qualification	MAE	NGA	ARE	USA
1	Sang Maestro	3	3	0	0	6	1	+5	9	Qualifiction to the Fourth round & National phase	—	—	2–0	3–1
2	Persinga (H)	3	2	0	1	4	2	+2	6	Qualifiction to the Fourth round & National phase	0–1	—	—	3–1
3	ArekMalang Indonesia	3	1	0	2	1	3	−2	3		—	0–1	—	—
4	UNESA	3	0	0	3	2	7	−5	0		—	—	0–1	—

Source: Liga 4 East Java
Legend: Blue = home team win; Yellow = draw; Red = away team win.
Rules for classification: 1) Points; 2) Head-to-head points; 3) Head-to-head goal difference; 4) Head-to-head goals scored; 5) Goal difference; 6) Goals scored; 7) Fair-play points; 8) Draw.
(H) Hosts

Matches

Matchday 1 (31 January 2025)
31 January 2025
13.15 WIB (UTC+7)

Sang Maestro	3–1	UNESA
	Report

Ketonggo Stadium, Ngawi
31 January 2025
15.15 WIB (UTC+7)

ArekMalang Indonesia	0–1	Persinga
	Report

Ketonggo Stadium, Ngawi

Matchday 2 (2 February 2025)
2 February 2025
13.00 WIB (UTC+7)

UNESA	0–1	ArekMalang Indonesia
	Report

Ketonggo Stadium, Ngawi
2 February 2025
15.00 WIB (UTC+7)

Persinga	0–1	Sang Maestro
	Report

Ketonggo Stadium, Ngawi

Matchday 3 (4 February 2025)
4 February 2025
13.00 WIB (UTC+7)

Sang Maestro	2–0	ArekMalang Indonesia
	Report

Ketonggo Stadium, Ngawi
4 February 2025
15.00 WIB (UTC+7)

Persinga	3–1	UNESA
	Report

Ketonggo Stadium, Ngawi

=== Group LL ===
All matches will be held at Brantas Stadium, Batu.

Pos	Team	Pld	W	D	L	GF	GA	GD	Pts	Qualification	PMA	KBA	PON	MJS
1	Persema	3	3	0	0	6	1	+5	9	Qualifiction to the Fourth round & National phase	—	—	—	3–0
2	Persikoba (H)	3	1	1	1	5	1	+4	4	Qualifiction to the Fourth round & National phase	0–1	—	—	5–0
3	Persepon	3	1	1	1	6	3	+3	4		1–2	0–0	—	—
4	Mojosari Putra	3	0	0	3	1	13	−12	0		—	—	1–5	—

Source: Liga 4 East Java
Legend: Blue = home team win; Yellow = draw; Red = away team win.
Rules for classification: 1) Points; 2) Head-to-head points; 3) Head-to-head goal difference; 4) Head-to-head goals scored; 5) Goal difference; 6) Goals scored; 7) Fair-play points; 8) Draw.
(H) Hosts

Matches

Matchday 1 (31 January 2025)
31 January 2025
13.15 WIB (UTC+7)

Mojosari Putra	1–5	Persepon
	Report

Brantas Stadium, Batu
31 January 2025
15.15 WIB (UTC+7)

Persikoba	0–1	Persema
	Report

Brantas Stadium, Batu

Matchday 2 (2 February 2025)
2 February 2025
13.00 WIB (UTC+7)

Persema	3–0	Mojosari Putra
	Report

Brantas Stadium, Batu
2 February 2025
15.00 WIB (UTC+7)

Persepon	0–0	Persikoba
	Report

Brantas Stadium, Batu

Matchday 3 (4 February 2025)
4 February 2025
13.00 WIB (UTC+7)

Persepon	1–2	Persema
	Report

Brantas Stadium, Batu
4 February 2025
15.00 WIB (UTC+7)

Persikoba	5–0	Mojosari Putra
	Report

Brantas Stadium, Batu

== Fourth round ==
The 8 teams that qualify from the third round will be drawn into 2 groups of four. The fourth round will be played in a home tournament format of single round-robin matches.

The top two teams of each group will qualify for the knockout round.

=== Group MM ===
All matches will be held at Ketonggo Stadium, Ngawi.

Pos	Team	Pld	W	D	L	GF	GA	GD	Pts	Qualification	NGA	PMP	MTR	KBA
1	Persinga (H)	3	3	0	0	5	2	+3	9	Qualifiction to the Knockout round	—	—	—	1–0
2	PS Mojokerto Putra	3	2	0	1	6	2	+4	6	Qualifiction to the Knockout round	1–2	—	2–0	—
3	Mitra Surabaya	3	0	1	2	2	5	−3	1		1–2	—	—	1–1
4	Persikoba	3	0	1	2	1	5	−4	1		—	0–3	—	—

Source: Liga 4 East Java
Legend: Blue = home team win; Yellow = draw; Red = away team win.
Rules for classification: 1) Points; 2) Head-to-head points; 3) Head-to-head goal difference; 4) Head-to-head goals scored; 5) Goal difference; 6) Goals scored; 7) Fair-play points; 8) Draw.
(H) Hosts

Matches

Matchday 1 (11 February 2025)
11 February 2025
13.00 WIB (UTC+7)

Persikoba	0–3	PS Mojokerto Putra
	Report

Ketonggo Stadium, Ngawi
11 February 2025
15.00 WIB (UTC+7)

Mitra Surabaya	1–2	Persinga
	Report

Ketonggo Stadium, Ngawi

Matchday 2 (13 February 2025)
13 February 2025
13.00 WIB (UTC+7)

PS Mojokerto Putra	2–0	Mitra Surabaya
	Report

Ketonggo Stadium, Ngawi
13 February 2025
15.00 WIB (UTC+7)

Persinga	1–0	Persikoba
	Report

Ketonggo Stadium, Ngawi

Matchday 3 (15 February 2025)
15 February 2025
13.00 WIB (UTC+7)

Mitra Surabaya	1–1	Persikoba
	Report

Ketonggo Stadium, Ngawi
15 February 2025
15.00 WIB (UTC+7)

PS Mojokerto Putra	1–2	Persinga
	Report

Ketonggo Stadium, Ngawi

=== Group NN ===
All matches will be held at Diponegoro Stadium, Banyuwangi.

Pos	Team	Pld	W	D	L	GF	GA	GD	Pts	Qualification	PWG	PMA	MAE	INT
1	Persewangi (H)	3	2	1	0	5	3	+2	7	Qualifiction to the Knockout round	—	—	1–1	—
2	Persema	3	2	0	1	5	2	+3	6	Qualifiction to the Knockout round	1–2	—	—	3–0
3	Sang Maestro	3	0	2	1	2	3	−1	2		—	0–1	—	—
4	Inter Kediri	3	0	1	2	2	6	−4	1		1–2	—	1–1	—

Source: Liga 4 East Java
Legend: Blue = home team win; Yellow = draw; Red = away team win.
Rules for classification: 1) Points; 2) Head-to-head points; 3) Head-to-head goal difference; 4) Head-to-head goals scored; 5) Goal difference; 6) Goals scored; 7) Fair-play points; 8) Draw.
(H) Hosts

Matches

Matchday 1 (11 February 2025)
11 February 2025
13.00 WIB (UTC+7)

Persema	3–0	Inter Kediri
	Report

Diponegoro Stadium, Banyuwangi
11 February 2025
15.00 WIB (UTC+7)

Persewangi	1–1	Sang Maestro
	Report

Diponegoro Stadium, Banyuwangi

Matchday 2 (13 February 2025)
13 February 2025
13.00 WIB (UTC+7)

Sang Maestro	0–1	Persema
	Report

Diponegoro Stadium, Banyuwangi
13 February 2025
15.00 WIB (UTC+7)

Inter Kediri	1–2	Persewangi
	Report

Diponegoro Stadium, Banyuwangi

Matchday 3 (15 February 2025)
15 February 2025
13.00 WIB (UTC+7)

Inter Kediri	1–1	Sang Maestro
	Report

Diponegoro Stadium, Banyuwangi
15 February 2025
15.00 WIB (UTC+7)

Persema	1–2	Persewangi
	Report

Diponegoro Stadium, Banyuwangi

== Knockout round ==
The knockout round will be played as a single match. If tied after regulation time, extra time and, if necessary, a penalty shoot-out will be used to decide the winning team.

=== Bracket ===
Semi-finals
21 February 2025 — Ngawi
NN1	Persewangi (p)	2 (7)
MM2	PS Mojokerto Putra	2 (6)
21 February 2025 — Ngawi
MM1	Persinga	1
NN2	Persema	0

Final
23 February 2025 — Ngawi
Persewangi (p)	1 (3)
Persinga	1 (1)
Third place play-off
23 February 2025 — Ngawi
PS Mojokerto Putra	2
Persema	1

=== Semi-finals ===
21 February 2025
13:15 WIB (UTC+7)

Persewangi	2–2	PS Mojokerto Putra
Alfian 34', 47'	Report	Aris 23', 65'
Penalties
Alfian (penalty scored); Fitrah (penalty scored); Fadel (penalty scored); Lutfi (penalty scored); Andika (penalty scored); Dheo (penalty scored); Arya (penalty scored)	7–6	Ferdi (penalty scored); Hasbiyanto (penalty scored); Rigyaldo (penalty scored); Andika (penalty scored); Angga Difa (penalty scored); Gangsar (penalty scored); Rizal (penalty missed)

Ketonggo Stadium, Ngawi

21 February 2025
15:15 WIB (UTC+7)

Persinga	1–0	Persema
Eko 21' (pen.)	Report

Ketonggo Stadium, Ngawi

=== Third place play-off ===
23 February 2025
13:00 WIB (UTC+7)

PS Mojokerto Putra	2–1	Persema
Hasbiyanto 58'; Handika 75'		Galih Tri 45'

Ketonggo Stadium, Ngawi

=== Final ===
23 February 2025
15:00 WIB (UTC+7)

Persewangi	1–1	Persinga
Akbar 12'	Report	Yoga 65'
Penalties
Akbar (penalty scored); Alfian (penalty missed); Lutfi (penalty scored); Ilham (penalty scored)	3–1	Ayuep (penalty scored); Harris (penalty missed); Eko (penalty missed); Slamet (penalty missed)

Ketonggo Stadium, Ngawi

== See also ==
- 2024–25 Liga 4
