= 2026 Liga 4 final =

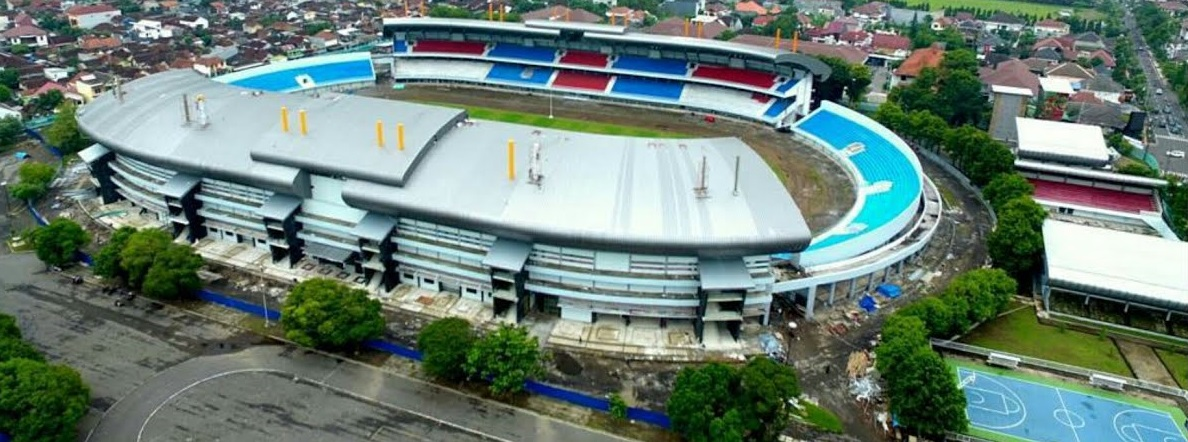
- The final was held in Mandala Krida Stadium, Yogyakarta.
- Event: 2025–26 Liga 4
Pasuruan United (East Java)	Pesik (West Java)
1	0
- Date: 11 July 2026

The 2026 Liga 4 final was the final match of the 2025–26 Liga 4, the second season of the fourth-tier competition in Indonesia under the current league structure organised by PSSI. It was held at Mandala Krida Stadium in Yogyakarta on 11 July 2026.

== Background ==
=== Pasuruan United ===
Since its establishment, Pasuruan United has never reached the final of a fourth-tier league.

In this season, Pasuruan United was successfully promoted to the 2026–27 Liga Nusantara, and will be marking their return to the third-tier after last competing at that level in the 2023–24 Liga 3, where they reached the national phase preliminary round.

=== Pesik ===
Since its establishment, Pesik has never reached the final of a fourth-tier league, making this season their best ever.

In this season, Pesik was successfully promoted to the 2026–27 Liga Nusantara, and will be marking their return to the third-tier after last competing at that level in the 2023–24 Liga 3, where they only played in the West Java provincial league and did not qualify for the national phase.

== Route to the final ==
=== Provincial phase ===
Pasuruan United
Round
Pesik
Provincial phase
Opponents
Result
First round
Opponents
Result
Surabaya Muda
9–0
Matchday 1
Persima Majalengka
0–0
Hizbul Wathan
4–0
Matchday 2
Al Jabbar
8–0
PSPK Pasuruan
5–0
Matchday 3
Persindra Indramayu
1–0
Group D winner

Pos	Team	Pld	Pts
1	Pasuruan United (H)	3	9
2	Hizbul Wathan	3	4
3	Surabaya Muda	3	4
4	PSPK Pasuruan	3	0

Source: 2025–26 Liga 4 East Java
(H) Hosts
Final standings
Group F winner

Pos	Team	Pld	Pts
1	Pesik (H)	3	7
2	Persindra	3	6
3	Persima	3	4
4	Al Jabbar (R)	3	0

Source: Liga 4 West Java Series 1
(H) Hosts; (R) Relegated
Opponents
Result
Second round
Opponents
Result
Nganjuk Ladang
3–0
Matchday 1
Persigar Garut
1–1
Triple'S Kediri
2–0
Matchday 2
PSB Bogor
3–2
Persatu Tuban
3–0
Matchday 3

Group BB winner

Pos	Team	Pld	Pts
1	Pasuruan United	3	9
2	Triple'S Kediri	3	4
3	Persatu Tuban (H)	3	4
4	Nganjuk Ladang	3	0

Source: 2025–26 Liga 4 East Java
(H) Hosts
Final standings
Group 3 runner-up

Pos	Team	Pld	Pts
1	Persigar	2	4
2	Pesik (H)	2	4
3	PSB Bogor	2	0

Source: Liga 4 West Java Series 1
(H) Hosts
Opponents
Result
Third round
Opponents
Result
UNESA
2–1
Matchday 1
Persindra Indramayu
1–0
Persepam Pamekasan
3–3
Matchday 2
ASAD Purwakarta
5–0
Persema Malang
1–0
Matchday 3
Cimahi United
1–2
Group JJ winner

Pos	Team	Pld	Pts
1	Pasuruan United (H)	3	7
2	Persepam Pamekasan	3	5
3	UNESA	3	4
4	Persema Malang	3	0

Source: 2025–26 Liga 4 East Java
(H) Hosts
Final standings
Group Y runner-up

Pos	Team	Pld	Pts
1	Cimahi United	3	9
2	Pesik	3	6
3	Persindra	3	3
4	ASAD Purwakarta (H)	3	0

Source: Liga 4 West Java Series 1
(H) Hosts
Opponents
Result
Fourth round
Opponents
Result
Persinga Ngawi
0–1
Matchday 1

Persikoba Batu
1–0
Matchday 2

PS Mojokerto Putra
2–1
Matchday 3

Group MM runner-up

Pos	Team	Pld	Pts
1	Persinga Ngawi	3	7
2	Pasuruan United (H)	3	6
3	Persikoba Batu	3	2
4	PS Mojokerto Putra	3	1

Source: 2025–26 Liga 4 East Java
(H) Hosts
Final standings

Opponents
Result
Knockout round
Opponents
Result
Persid Jember
1–1 (3–2 (p))
Semi-final
Semi-final (Leg 1)
Persika 1951
0–1
Persepam Pamekasan
1–1 (3–5 (p))
Final
Semi-final (Leg 2)
Persika 1951
1–2

Third-place PO
Cimahi United
4–1

=== National phase ===
Pasuruan United
Round
Pesik
National phase
Opponents
Result
First round
Opponents
Result
PSAP Sigli
1–1
Matchday 1
Persiwah Mempawah
2–0
Bolsel
2–0
Matchday 2
PS Badung
1–0
Persigar Garut
1–0
Matchday 3
Villa 2000 B
1–2
Group N winner

Pos	Team	Pld	Pts
1	(East Java) Pasuruan United (H)	3	7
2	(West Java) Persigar	3	4
3	(North Sulawesi) Bolsel	3	3
4	(Aceh) PSAP	3	2

Source: Liga 4 national phase
(H) Hosts
Final standings
Group A winner

Pos	Team	Pld	Pts
1	(West Java) Pesik	3	6
2	(Bali) PS Badung	3	4
3	(Jakarta) Villa 2000 B (H)	3	4
4	(West Kalimantan) Persiwah	3	2

Source: Liga 4 national phase
(H) Hosts
Opponents
Result
Second round
Opponents
Result
Persiharjo Sukoharjo
0–0
Matchday 1
Persemar Martapura
2–1
Persid Jember
1–1
Matchday 2
Cimahi United
1–2
Persak Kebumen
1–0
Matchday 3
Persibangga Purbalingga
1–1
Group X winner

Pos	Team	Pld	Pts
1	(East Java) Pasuruan United	3	5
2	(Central Java) Persak	3	4
3	(East Java) Persid (H)	3	4
4	(Central Java) Persiharjo	3	2

Source: Liga 4 national phase
(H) Hosts
Final standings
Group Q runner-up

Pos	Team	Pld	Pts
1	(Central Java) Persibangga (H)	3	7
2	(West Java) Pesik	3	4
3	(South Kalimantan) Persemar	3	3
4	(West Java) Cimahi United	3	3

Source: Liga 4 national phase
(H) Hosts
Opponents
Result
Third round
Opponents
Result
Persepam Pamekasan
2–0
Matchday 1
Wahana
2–1
Persipani Paniai
2–0
Matchday 2
Persma 1960
3–0
Celebest
2–2
Matchday 3
Unaaha
1–1
Group DD winner

Pos	Team	Pld	Pts
1	(East Java) Pasuruan United	3	7
2	(Central Papua) Persipani	3	6
3	(Central Sulawesi) Celebest	3	4
4	(East Java) Persepam	3	0

Source: Liga 4 national phase
Final standings
Group BB winner

Pos	Team	Pld	Pts
1	(West Java) Pesik	3	7
2	(Southeast Sulawesi) Unaaha (H)	3	4
3	(North Sulawesi) Persma 1960	3	3
4	(Riau) Wahana	3	3

Source: Liga 4 national phase
(H) Hosts
Opponents
Result
Fourth round
Opponents
Result
Persipani Paniai
0–1
Matchday 1
Persigar Garut
2–0
Persigar Garut
1–0
Matchday 2
Persipani Paniai
0–0
Pesik Kuningan
2–0
Matchday 3
Pasuruan
0–2
Group A winner

Pos	Team	Pld	Pts
1	(East Java) Pasuruan United (P)	3	6
2	(West Java) Pesik (P)	3	4
3	(Central Papua) Persipani (P)	3	4
4	(West Java) Persigar	3	3

Source: Liga 4 national phase
(P) Promoted
Final standings
Group A runner-up

Pos	Team	Pld	Pts
1	(East Java) Pasuruan United (P)	3	6
2	(West Java) Pesik (P)	3	4
3	(Central Papua) Persipani (P)	3	4
4	(West Java) Persigar	3	3

Source: Liga 4 national phase
(P) Promoted
Opponents
Result
Knockout round
Opponents
Result
Persinga Ngawi
0–0 (5–4 (p))
Semi-final
PSN Ngada
1–1 (5–4 (p))

== Format ==
The final will be played as a single match. If tied after regulation time, extra time and, if necessary, a penalty shoot-out will be used to decide the winning team.

== Match ==
11 July 2026
14:00 UTC+7

Pasuruan United (East Java)	1–0	(West Java) Pesik
Surya 80'	Report

Mandala Krida Stadium, Yogyakarta

== See also ==
- 2025–26 Liga 4
