= Slamet Sampurno =

Indonesian footballer

Personal information
- Full name: Slamet Sampurno
- Date of birth: 19 March 1981 (age 45)
- Place of birth: Lumajang, Indonesia
- Height: 1.78 m (5 ft 10 in)
- Position: Defender

Senior career*
Years	Team	Apps	(Gls)
1998–2004	PSIL Lumajang	72	(5)
2004–2005	PSSS Situbondo	27	(0)
2006–2007	Persid Jember	20	(0)
2007–2008	Persiba Balikpapan	31	(1)
2008–2009	PSIM Yogyakarta	20	(4)
2009–2010	Persibo Bojonegoro	29	(3)
2010–2017	Persik Kediri	128	(8)
2012–2013	→ Persewangi Banyuwangi (loan)	26	(0)
2014–2015	→ Persijap Jepara (loan)	11	(0)
2016	→ Persinga Ngawi (loan)	24	(1)
2018	Semeru	12	(0)
Total		400	(22)

Managerial career
- 2019–2020: PSIL Lumajang
- 2022–2023: Persid Jember
- 2023: PSIL Lumajang
- 2024–: Mitra Surabaya
- * Club domestic league appearances and goals

Slamet Sampurno (born 19 March 1981) also known as Cak Met, is an Indonesian professional football coach and former player who is currently head coach of Mitra Surabaya. He is also a former player of Persibo Bojonegoro in 2009–10 Liga Indonesia Premier Division.

== Honours ==
Persibo Bojonegoro

- Liga Indonesia Premier Division: 2009–10
