= Notohadinegoro Stadium =

Football stadium in Jember, Indonesia

- Location in Java
- Location: Jember Regency, East Java, Indonesia
- Coordinates: 8.153958°S 113.702296°E
- Owner: Regency government of Jember
- Operator: Regency government of Jember
- Capacity: 15,000
- Surface: Grass field

Tenant
- Persid Jember

Notohadinegoro Stadium is a football stadium in the town of Jember, Indonesia. The stadium has a capacity of 15,000 people.

It is the home base of Persid Jember .
