= Inter Kediri F.C. =

Inter Kediri
- Full name: Inter Kediri Football Club
- Nickname: Laskar Boncolono
- Short name: IPK, Inter
- Founded: 2016; 10 years ago
- Ground: Brawijaya Stadium
- Capacity: 10,000
- CEO: Tomi Ariwibowo
- Coach: Budiardjo Thalib
- League: Liga 4
- 2024–25: Fourth round, 4th in Group NN (East Java zone); First round, 3rd in Group J (National phase)
Home colours	Away colours

Inter Kediri, sometimes known as Inter Pemuda Kediri, is an Indonesian football club based in Kediri City, East Java. They currently compete in the Liga 4 East Java Zone. Their homebase is Brawijaya Stadium.

== Players ==
As of 29 December 2024

Note: Flags indicate national team as defined under FIFA eligibility rules; some limited exceptions apply. Players may hold more than one non-FIFA nationality.

No.	Pos.	Nation	Player
1	GK	IDN	M. Syarif
2	DF	IDN	Fandy
4	DF	IDN	Samudra
7	FW	IDN	Bintang
8	DF	IDN	Dowi
9	FW	IDN	Bagus
10	MF	IDN	Umar
11	FW	IDN	Sadeka
12	FW	IDN	Dicky
13	FW	IDN	Nur Azji
14	DF	IDN	Danen

No.	Pos.	Nation	Player
15	DF	IDN	Dedi
16	MF	IDN	Fadilah
18	MF	IDN	Zulfikar
19	MF	IDN	Zakaria
20	GK	IDN	Julian
21	MF	IDN	Prisma
23	DF	IDN	Levi
25	MF	IDN	Nicky
26	MF	IDN	Fahad
29	MF	LBR	Sackie Doe
30	GK	IDN	Nafian
