= Gelora Bangkalan Stadium =

Football Stadium in Bangkalan, Indonesia

- SGB
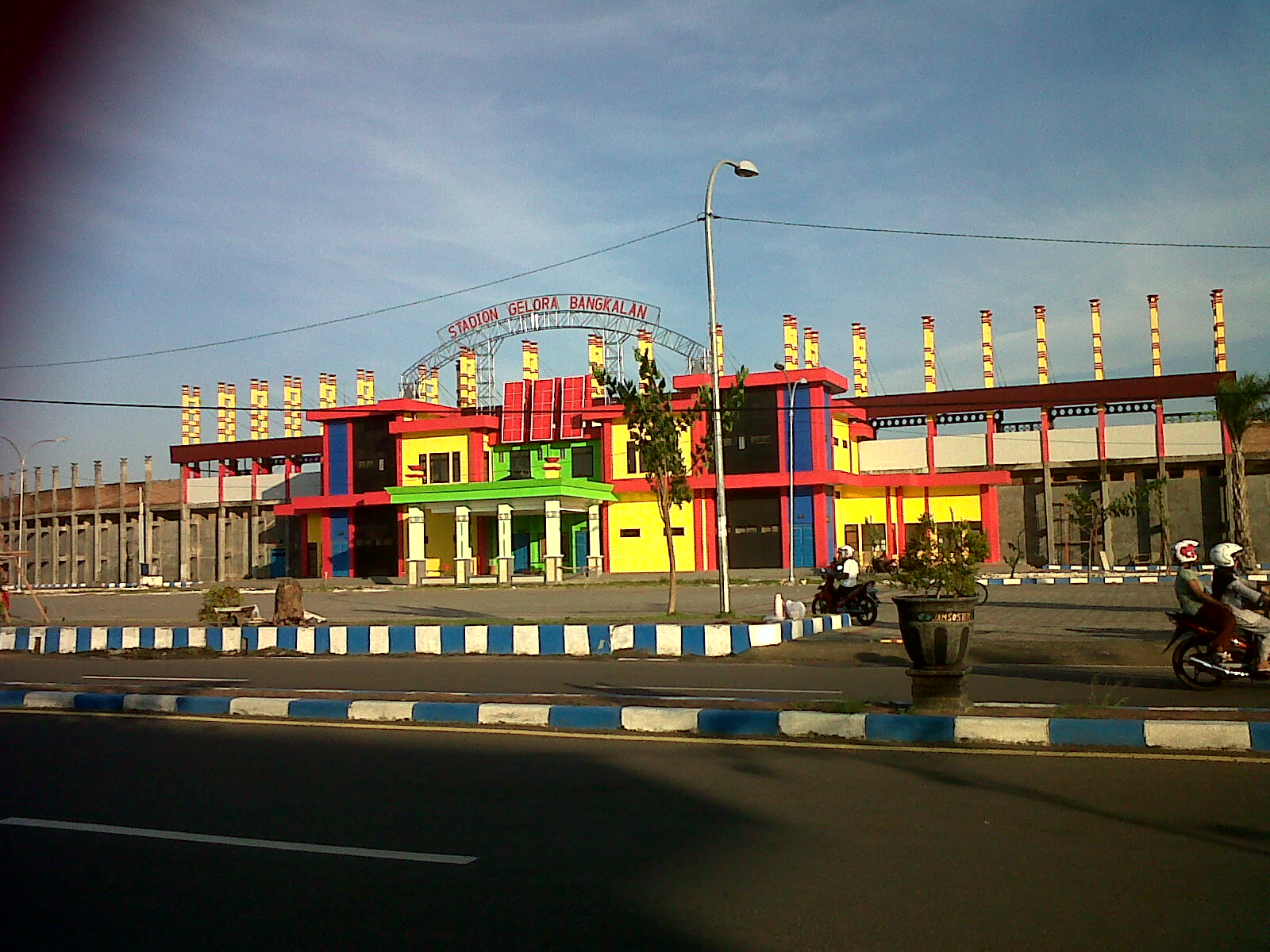
- Frontview

- Location in Java and Indonesia Gelora Bangkalan Stadium (Indonesia)
- Address: Jl. Soekarno Hatta, Wr 08, Mlajah, Bangkalan, Bangkalan Regency, East Java 69116; Indonesia
- Location: Bangkalan, Bangkalan Regency, East Java
- Coordinates: 7°2′36.2″S 112°44′22.1″E
- Owner: Local Government Bangkalan Regency
- Operator: Local Government Bangkalan Regency
- Capacity: 15,000
- Surface: Japan Grass

Construction
- Built: 2010–2012
- Opened: 2012

Tenants
- Persepam Madura United; Perseba Bangkalan; Madura United

Gelora Bangkalan Stadium is a football stadium in Bangkalan, Indonesia. It is located on Jalan Soekarno-Hatta, Bangkalan

== History ==
The stadium was built in 2012 with a seating capacity of 15.000. It is located on Jalan Soekarno-Hatta, Bangkalan. The building of the stadium was also meant to support the bid of their neighbouring city Surabaya, for the 2019 Asian Games. It has a food center located in the north area of the stadium.

== Other uses ==
Persepam Madura United used this stadium for their home games. Persebaya Surabaya also temporarily used the stadium for the 2013 Indonesian Premier League, because of the renovation of Gelora Bung Tomo Stadium.
