= Persida Sidoarjo =

Indonesian football club

- Full name: Persatuan Sepakbola Indonesia Sidoarjo
- Nickname(s): Laskar Jenggolo (Jenggolo Warriors)
- Founded: 1963; 62 years ago
- Ground: Gelora Delta; Sidoarjo, East Java
- Capacity: 35,000
- Owner: Muhammad Mahfud
- Coach: Istiko Hadi Susanto
- League: Liga 4
- 2024–25: Round of 32, (East Java zone)
Home colours	Away colours

Persida stands for Persatuan Sepakbola Indonesia Sidoarjo (en: Football Association of Indonesia Sidoarjo). Persida Sidoarjo is an Indonesian football club based in Sidoarjo, East Java. They compete in Liga 4. Their home ground is Gelora Delta Stadium, which is situated in downtown Sidoarjo, East Java.
