= AC Majapahit =

Indonesian football club

- Full name: Associazione Calcio Majapahit
- Nickname: Laskar Guntur Geni (Guntur Geni Warriors)
- Founded: 7 December 2020; 5 years ago
- Ground: Gajah Mada Stadium; Mojokerto Regency, Indonesia
- Capacity: 10,000
- Owner: PT. Patriots Pamenang Majapahit
- CEO: Pangeran P. Siahaan
- Coach: Ambitie Dolus Cahyana
- League: Liga 4
- 2024–25: Round of 32, (East Java zone)
- Website: http://acmajapahit.com/
Home colours	Away colours

AC Majapahit (or abbreviated Associazione Calcio Majapahit) is an Indonesian semi-professional football team based in Mojokerto Regency, East Java. AC Majapahit currently competes in Liga 4 East Java zone.

== History ==
AC Majapahit's predecessor was Jember United Football Club. In 2019, Jember United was acquired by Patriots Pamenang Majapahit Ltd. and moved its homebase from Jember Regency to Mojokerto Regency. On 7 December 2020, it was decided to inaugurate the AC Majapahit.

== Players ==
=== Current squad ===
As of 31 August 2021

Note: Flags indicate national team as defined under FIFA eligibility rules; some limited exceptions apply. Players may hold more than one non-FIFA nationality.

No.	Pos.	Nation	Player
—	GK	IDN	M. Annas Nur Fadhillah
—	GK	IDN	Aqshal Mahenda Putra
—	GK	IDN	Gale Trisna Prakastiwi
—	GK	IDN	Agung Pranata
—	GK	IDN	Mohammad Tegar Surya Mahendra
—	DF	IDN	Egi Wiranata
—	DF	IDN	M. Wildan Dzaky Haidar
—	DF	IDN	M. Alfin Widad
—	DF	IDN	Tiyok Fendi Pratama
—	DF	IDN	Alif Firmansyah Putra Arisanto
—	DF	IDN	Figo Dimas Yuniansyah

No.	Pos.	Nation	Player
—	DF	IDN	Wira Faturrakhman
—	MF	IDN	M. Firman Jahidin
—	MF	IDN	Jiff Reymon Matuan
—	MF	IDN	Zacky Maharim Abdillah
—	MF	IDN	Mohamad Iqbal
—	MF	IDN	Bimas Raditya
—	MF	IDN	Almayda Deca Irfiansyah
—	MF	IDN	M. Kholis Sabilal Firdaus
—	FW	IDN	Andi Hardianto
—	FW	IDN	Aldo Rhoma Riyou

== Stadium ==
To navigate the competition 2021 Liga 3, AC Majapahit used Gajah Mada Stadium, Mojokerto Regency.
