= UNESA F.C. =

Indonesian football club

UNESA
- Full name: Universitas Negeri Surabaya Football Club
- Short name: UNESA
- Founded: 2023; 3 years ago as Kresna UNESA; 2024; 2 years ago as UNESA FC
- Ground: UNESA Football Field; Surabaya
- Capacity: 1,000
- Owner: State University of Surabaya
- Manager: Sujarwanto
- Coach: David Agus
- League: Liga 4
- 2024–25: Round of 16, (East Java zone)
Home colours	Away colours

Universitas Negeri Surabaya Football Club, simply known as UNESA FC, is an Indonesian football club based in Surabaya, East Java. They currently compete in the Liga 4 East Java Zone.
