= Persekap Pasuruan =

Indonesian football club

Persekap
- Full name: Persatuan Sepakbola Kota Pasuruan
- Nicknames: Untung Suropati Warriors; The Lasser; The Yellow Swallow
- Founded: 1926; 100 years ago
- Ground: Untung Suropati Stadium; Pasuruan, East Java; Indonesia
- Capacity: 5,000
- Owner: Pasuruan City Government
- Manager: Ismail Marzuki Hasan
- Coach: Masdra Nurriza
- League: Liga 4
- 2024–25: 3rd, in Group C (East Java zone)
Home colours	Away colours

Persatuan Sepakbola Kota Pasuruan (simply known as Persekap) is an Indonesian football club based in Pasuruan, East Java. They currently compete in Liga 4 East Java zone.

== Honours ==
- Liga Indonesia First Division
  - Champions: 2011-12
