= Mitra Surabaya F.C. =

Indonesian football club

Mitra Surabaya
- Full name: Mitra Surabaya Football Club
- Nickname: Laskar Sawunggaling
- Short name: Mitra
- Ground: Poral Field, Surabaya; Alas Buluh Field, Banyuwangi; Bima Sakti Field, Banyuwangi
- Manager: Decky Firmansyah
- Coach: Slamet Sampurno
- League: Liga 4
- 2024–25: Fourth round, 3rd in Group MM (East Java zone); First round, 4th in Group M (National phase)
| Home colours | Away colours |

Mitra Surabaya Football Club is an Indonesian football club based in Banyuwangi, East Java. They are currently competes in Liga 4 East Java zone.

== History ==
The current Mitra Surabaya was founded by former players of previous Mitra Surabaya club which was move their homebase to Palangka Raya in 1999 because it was bought by a businessman from Kalimantan who then transformed into Mitra Kalteng Putra and then later became PS Mitra Kukar in 2003.

Formed in Surabaya, the club was acquired in 2025 by Banyuwangi-based businessman Decky Firmansyah, who relocated it to Wongsorejo District, Banyuwangi. Initially based at Alas Buluh Field, Mitra Surabaya played their 2024–25 Liga 4 East Java matches at Bima Sakti Field, also in Wongsorejo.
