= Malang United F.C. =

Association football team in Indonesia

Malang United
- Full name: Malang United Football Club
- Nicknames: Kuda Hitam (Black Horse)
- Short name: MUFC
- Founded: 30 January 2017; 9 years ago
- Ground: Gajayana Stadium
- Capacity: 25,000
- Owner: PT. Akademi Sepakbola Malang Bersatu
- President: Djoko Purwoko
- Manager: Miftahul Hanif
- Coach: Rochmad Santoso
- League: Liga 4
- 2024–25: Round of 32, (East Java zone)
Home colours	Away colours

Malang United Football Club (simply known as Malang United or MUFC) is an Indonesian football club based in Malang, East Java. They currently compete in the Liga 4.

== Coaching staff ==
Position	Name
President	(Indonesia) Djoko Purwoko
Manager	(Indonesia) Miftahul Hanif
Commissioner	(Indonesia) Angelo Emanuel F Seac
Head Coach	(Indonesia) Rochmad Santoso
Assistant Coach	(Indonesia) Ismail
Physical Coach	(Indonesia) Zaenal
Goalkeeper Coach	(Indonesia) Syukrian
