= Persipro 54 =

Indonesian football club

Persipro 1954
- Full name: Persatuan Sepakbola Indonesia Probolinggo 1954
- Nickname(s): Serigala Tengger (Tengger Wolf); Laskar Minak Jinggo (Minak Jinggo Warriors)
- Founded: 11 April 1954; 71 years ago
- Ground: Bayu Angga Stadium; Probolinggo, East Java
- Capacity: 15,000
- Owner: Askot PSSI Probolinggo City
- Chairman: Eko Purwanto
- Manager: Hadi Zainal Abidin
- Coach: Ahmad Junaidi
- League: Liga 4
- 2024–25: Round of 32, (East Java zone)
Home colours	Away colours

Persatuan Sepakbola Indonesia Probolinggo 1954 or Persipro 1954 is an Indonesian football club based in Probolinggo, East Java. They currently compete in the Liga 4.

Persipro stadium named Bayu Angga Stadium. Its location was in downtown Probolinggo.
