= Perseba Bangkalan =

Indonesian football club

Perseba
- Full name: Persatuan Sepakbola Bangkalan
- Nicknames: Laskar Ke'Lesap (Ke'Lesap Warriors)
- Short name: Perseba
- Founded: 2012; 14 years ago
- Ground: Gelora Bangkalan Stadium
- Capacity: 15,000
- Owner: Bangkalan Government
- Chairman: Abdul Latif Amin Imron
- Manager: Moch Fauzan Ja'far
- Coach: Muhammad Syafi'i
- League: Liga 4
- 2024–25: 3rd, in Group D (East Java zone)
Home colours	Away colours

Persatuan Sepakbola Bangkalan (simply known as Perseba) is an Indonesian football club based in Bangkalan Regency, Madura Island, East Java. They currently compete in the Liga 4.

== Honours ==
- Liga Indonesia Third Division
  - Champion (1): 2013
