= PS Unmuh Jember =

Association football team in Indonesia

PS Universitas Muhammadiyah Jember
- Full name: Persatuan Sepakbola Universitas Muhammadiyah Jember
- Founded: 2014; 11 years ago as PSPK Pasuruan
- Ground: Muhammadiyah University of Jember Football Field
- Capacity: 1,000
- Owner: Muhammadiyah University of Jember
- Manager: Syamsul Hadi
- Coach: Rizki Apriliyanto
- League: Liga 4
- 2021: Round of 16, (East Java zone)
- Website: http://www.unmuhjember.ac.id/id/
Home colours	Away colours

PS Unmuh Jember (previously known as PSPK Pasuruan) is an Indonesian football club based in Jember, East Java. They currently compete in the Liga 4.
