= Persepon Ponorogo =

Indonesian football club

- Full name: Persatuan Sepakbola Ponorogo
- Nickname: Laskar Suromenggolo
- Founded: 19 April 1960; 66 years ago
- Ground: Batoro Katong Stadium; Ponorogo, East Java
- Capacity: 5,000
- Owner: Askab PSSI Ponorogo
- Chairman: Rizal Akbar
- Manager: Gatot Saiman
- Coach: Windu Wibowo
- League: Liga 4
- 2024–25: Round of 16, (East Java zone)
Home colours	Away colours

Persatuan Sepakbola Ponorogo, or Persepon Ponorogo, is an Indonesian football club based in Ponorogo Regency, East Java. The club plays in the Liga 4. Their home base is Batoro Katong Stadium.

== Players ==
=== Current squad ===
As of 29 December 2024

Note: Flags indicate national team as defined under FIFA eligibility rules; some limited exceptions apply. Players may hold more than one non-FIFA nationality.

No.	Pos.	Nation	Player
2	DF	IDN	Taufik Hidayat
4	DF	IDN	Rio Fardiyansah
5	DF	IDN	Didik Setyawan
6	DF	IDN	Rizky Dwi (captain)
7	MF	IDN	Radhika Wahyu
8	MF	IDN	Dodik Agung
9	FW	IDN	Yoga Adi
10	FW	IDN	Alfinza Yuzda
11	MF	IDN	Sidik Tri
12	MF	IDN	Revi Nuri
13	DF	IDN	Salman Alfarisi
14	MF	IDN	Achmad Agung
15	MF	IDN	Muhammad Reihan

No.	Pos.	Nation	Player
16	FW	IDN	Yohan Riza
17	MF	IDN	Doni Kurniyanto
19	DF	IDN	Galing Dwi
20	GK	IDN	Irfan Abdilah
21	DF	IDN	Alfin Ardiansyah
23	MF	IDN	Muhammad Ilham
25	DF	IDN	Lukmansah
27	MF	IDN	Hardiansyah
28	MF	IDN	Eka Yudha
29	GK	IDN	Ferdian Rizky
37	FW	IDN	Arjun Ariyanto
78	GK	IDN	Fahmi Adam
