= Perspa Pacitan =

Indonesian football club

- Full name: Persatuan Sepakbola Pacitan
- Nickname(s): Laskar Kanjeng Jimat (Kanjeng Jimat's Warriors); Serdadu Grindulu (Blue Ocean Squad)
- Founded: 22 August 1958; 66 years ago
- Ground: Pacitan Stadium; Pacitan Regency, East Java
- Capacity: 10,000
- Owner: Askab PSSI Pacitan
- Manager: Hudiono
- Coach: Pratama Nahrowi
- League: Liga 4
- 2024–25: 3rd, in Group P (East Java zone)
Home colours	Away colours

Persatuan Sepakbola Pacitan (commonly known as Perspa Pacitan) is an Indonesian football club based in Pacitan, East Java. They currently compete in the Liga 4.

== Supporters ==
Perspa Pacitan supporters' group is known as Pac Man (Pacitan Mania).
