= Persiga Trenggalek =

Indonesian football club

- Full name: Persatuan Sepak bola Indonesia; Trenggalek
- Nickname(s): The White Elephant; Minak Sopal Army
- Founded: 1982; 43 years ago
- Ground: Menak Sopal Stadium; Trenggalek, East Java
- Capacity: 10,000
- Owner: Trenggalek Regency Government
- Manager: Nur Effendi
- Coach: Mursyid Effendi
- League: Liga 4
- 2024–25: 4th, in Group K (East Java zone)
Home colours	Away colours

Persatuan Sepakbola Indonesia Trenggalek (en: Football Association of Indonesia Trenggalek) is an Indonesian football club based in Trenggalek, East Java. They currently compete in the Liga 4.

== Supporter ==
Galakmania is a supporter of Persiga Trenggalek.

== Honours ==
- Liga Indonesia Third Division
  - Champions: 2012
- Liga 3 East Java
  - Champions: 2018

== Kit Suppliers ==
- (Indonesia) Fitsee (2018–2020)
- (Indonesia) Mcloth (2021– present)
