= Brawijaya Stadium =

Multi-use stadium in Kediri, Indonesia

- Brawijaya
- Interactive map of Brawijaya Stadium
- Location: Kediri, East Java, Indonesia
- Coordinates: 7°49′01″S 112°01′43″E
- Owner: Persik Kediri
- Operator: Government of Kediri City
- Capacity: 10,000

Construction
- Opened: 1983; 43 years ago

Tenant
- Persik Kediri

Brawijaya Stadium is a football stadium in the city of Kediri, East Java, Indonesia. It was built in 1983 and underwent renovations in 2000. Brawijaya Stadium has a capacity of 10,000 seats, as well as the headquarters for a football team named Persik Kediri, nicknamed the white tigers. Persik Kediri has won two Indonesian league titles and has also represented the city of Kediri and Indonesia in the Asian arena in the AFC Champions League tournament.
