= Blitar Poetra F.C. =

Association football team in Indonesia

Blitar Poetra FC
- Full name: Blitar Poetra Football Club
- Nickname(s): Laskar Lembu Suro
- Short name: BPFC
- Founded: 1971; 54 years ago
- Ground: Gelora Bumi Penataran Stadium; Blitar, East Java
- Capacity: 8,000
- Owner: Askab PSSI Blitar
- Chairman: Rini Syarifah
- Manager: Hendik Budi Yuantoro
- Coach: Yudianto
- League: Liga 4
- 2024–25: 3rd, in Group H (East Java zone)
Home colours	Away colours

Blitar Poetra Football Club (simply known as Blitar Poetra) is an Indonesian football club based in Blitar Regency, East Java. They currently compete in the Liga 4.
