= Bumi Wali F.C. =

Association football team in Indonesia

Bumi Wali FC
- Full name: Bumi Wali Football Club
- Nickname(s): Laskar Sunan Bonang (Sunan Bonang Warriors)
- Short name: BWFC
- Founded: 7 May 2017; 7 years ago
- Ground: Loka Jaya Stadium; Tuban, East Java
- Capacity: 5,000
- Owner: National Sports Committee of Indonesia Tuban
- Chairman: Muhbib
- Manager: Budi Sulistyono
- Coach: Ainur Rofiq
- League: Liga 4
- 2024–25: 4th, in Group M (East Java zone)
Home colours	Away colours

Bumi Wali Football Club (simply known as Bumi Wali FC or BWFC) is an Indonesian football club based in Tuban Regency, East Java. They currently compete in the Liga 4.
