= Surabaya Muda F.C. =

Association football team in Indonesia

Surabaya Muda
- Full name: Surabaya Muda Football Club
- Nickname: Hiu Muda (The Little Sharks)
- Founded: 2010; 16 years ago
- Ground: Gelora 10 November Stadium; Surabaya, East Java
- Capacity: 20,000
- Chairman: Saleh Hanifah
- Manager: Mariyono
- Coach: Soni Setiawan
- League: Liga 4 (Indonesia)
- 2024–25: 5th, in Group I (East Java zone)
Home colours	Away colours

Surabaya Muda Football Club is an Indonesian football club based in Surabaya, East Java. They currently compete in the Liga 4.
