= PS Kota Pahlawan =

Association football team in Indonesia

- Full name: Persatuan Sepakbola Kota Pahlawan
- Nickname(s): The Young Warriors
- Short name: KOPA, PS KoPa
- Founded: 2018; 7 years ago
- Ground: Kodam V Brawijaya Stadium; Surabaya, East Java
- Owner: Koperasi Surya Abadi Persebaya
- Manager: Juliantono Hadi
- Coach: Ahmad Rosyidin
- League: Liga 4
- 2024–25: Round of 32, (East Java zone)
- Website: http://www.persebaya.id
Home colours	Away colours

Persatuan Sepakbola Kota Pahlawan (simply known as PS KoPa or PS Kota Pahlawan) is an Indonesian football club based in Surabaya, East Java. They currently compete in the Liga 4.

Founded in 2018 as PS Kota Pahlawan or PS KoPa, it is the reserve team of Persebaya Surabaya, and currently plays in Liga 3, holding its home matches at the Kodam V Brawijaya Stadium, Surabaya.
