= Persikapro Probolinggo =

Indonesian football club

Persikapro
- Full name: Persatuan Sepakbola Indonesia Kabupaten Probolinggo
- Nickname(s): Laskar Panji Laras
- Ground: Bayu Angga Stadium; Probolinggo Regency, East Java
- Capacity: 12,000
- Owner: PSSI Probolinggo Regency
- Chairman: Didik Mustadi
- Manager: Bambang Robianto
- Coach: Atipno
- League: Liga 4
- 2024–25: 4th, in Group B (East Java zone)
Home colours	Away colours

Persatuan Sepakbola Indonesia Kabupaten Probolinggo, simply known as Persikapro, is an Indonesian football club based in Probolinggo Regency, East Java. This club competed in Liga 4.
