= PSIL Lumajang =

Indonesian football club

- Full name: Persatuan Sepakbola Indonesia Lumajang
- Nicknames: Walangkopo Bilok (Flying Squirrel); Laskar Wirabhumi (Wirabhumi Warriors)
- Short name: PSIL
- Founded: 1947; 79 years ago
- Ground: Semeru Stadium; Lumajang, Indonesia
- Capacity: 15.000
- Owner: Askab PSSI Lumajang
- Chairman: H. Thoriq
- Manager: Bambang
- Coach: Slamet Sampurno
- League: Liga 4
- 2024–25: 4th, in Group C (East Java zone)
Home colours	Away colours

Persatuan Sepakbola Indonesia Lumajang or PSIL is an Indonesian football club based in Lumajang, East Java that competes in Liga 4. Their nicknames are Laskar Wirabhumi and Walangkopo Bilok (The Flying Squirrel). They play their home matches at Semeru Stadium.
