= PSID Jombang =

Indonesian football club

- Full name: Persatuan Sepakbola Indonesia Djombang
- Nickname(s): Kebo Kicak (en: The Kicak Buffalo)
- Founded: 1953; 72 years ago
- Ground: Merdeka Stadium; Jombang Regency, East Java
- Capacity: 10.530
- Owner: Jombang Government
- Manager: Ariyono
- Coach: Hendrawan Dwi Susanto
- League: Liga 4
- 2024–25: Round of 32, (East Java zone)
| Home colours | Away colours |

PSID stands for Persatuan Sepakbola Indonesia Djombang is a football club based in Jombang Regency, East Java. They currently compete in the Liga 4.

In the 1970s–80s, The Kebo Kicak was among the top in East Java. The golden age of PSID Jombang is also not separated from the intervention of the Regent of Jombang at that time, R. Soedirman, because he is much concerned in the field of sports and art, especially music art.

Currently, PSID Djombang itself is struggling to navigate the tight competition Liga 4.
