= PSSS Situbondo =

Indonesian football club

- Full name: Persatuan Sepakbola Seluruh Situbondo
- Nickname: Macan Baluran
- Ground: Gelora Mohammad Saleh Stadium; Situbondo, East Java
- Capacity: 2,000
- Owner: PSSI Situbondo Regency
- Chairman: Gatot Siswayo
- Manager: Totok Eko Bahari
- Coach: Adi Putra Setiawan
- League: Liga 4
- 2024–25: 3rd, in Group A (East Java zone)
Home colours	Away colours

Persatuan Sepakbola Seluruh Situbondo (simply known as PSSS) is an Indonesian football club based in Situbondo Regency, East Java. They currently compete in Liga 4 and their homeground is Gelora Mohammad Saleh Stadium.

== Coaching staff ==
As of 4 October 2022

Position	Staff
Head coach	(Indonesia) Adi Putra Setiawan
Assistant coach	(Indonesia) Eka Navy Nurfauzi
Physical Coach	(Indonesia) A. Zaini Fathur Rohman
Goalkeeper coach	(Indonesia) M. Supriyanto
