= Persikoba Batu =

Indonesian football club

Persikoba
- Full name: Persatuan Sepakbola Indonesia Kota Batu
- Nickname: Elang Putih (White Eagle)
- Founded: 2003; 23 years ago
- Ground: Brantas Stadium; Batu, East Java
- Capacity: 10,000
- Owner: PSSI Batu City
- Chairman: Ganisa Pratiwi
- Manager: Heli Suyanto
- Coach: Arif Suyono
- League: Liga 4 Indonesia
- 2024–25: Third round (National)
Home colours	Away colours

Persatuan Sepakbola Indonesia Kota Batu (simply known as Persikoba) is an Indonesian football club based in Batu City, East Java. They currently compete in the Liga 4 Indonesia.
