= Persid Jember =

Indonesian football club

- Full name: Persatuan Sepakbola Indonesia Djember
- Nicknames: Macan Raung (The Raung Tigers)
- Founded: 20 May 1952; 73 years ago
- Ground: Jember Sports Garden (JSG Stadium); Jember, East Java
- Capacity: 20,000
- Owner: Yayasan Wes Wayahe Jember Bangkit
- Chairman: Rezky Pratama Hermansyah
- Coach: Misnadi Amrizal
- League: Liga 4
- 2024–25: Round of 32, (East Java zone)
Home colours	Away colours

Persatuan Sepakbola Indonesia Djember (simply known as Persid or Persid Jember) is an Indonesian football club based in Jember, East Java. They currently compete in the Liga 4.

The stadium that Persid plays in is called Notohadinegoro Stadium and is located in downtown Jember.

== History ==
These teams in 2007 playing in First Division after the 2002/2003 season on the Second Division Competition PSSI.

These teams also have produced several players who take part in football Indonesia, such as Hendro Kartiko, Anton Wahyudi, etc.

Persid prepared in PSSI First Division competition in 2008 with former players handled by Persebaya, Santoso Pribadi. Previously, Persid had several times failed to qualify for the Premier Division although they often placed in the top standings in the group. With most of the original players including national goalkeeper Hendro Kartiko, and having gained the experience of doing business in Jember and playing in the national football, Persid expected to qualify for the 2021 Liga 3 with a contracted coach Riono Asnan.

== Players ==
=== Current squad ===
As of 3 September 2021

Note: Flags indicate national team as defined under FIFA eligibility rules; some limited exceptions apply. Players may hold more than one non-FIFA nationality.

No.	Pos.	Nation	Player
—	GK	IDN	Yulian Nur Rahmaddani
—	GK	IDN	Ray Aldi
—	GK	IDN	Fikri Andika
—	DF	IDN	Abdillah M M H
—	MF	IDN	Saiful Anshari
—	DF	IDN	Ajudya Eka Kurniawan
—	DF	IDN	Alvaro Chanigia
—	DF	IDN	Iskandar Fauzi
—	DF	IDN	Nofa Abdul Latif
—	DF	IDN	Diki Safitra
—	DF	IDN	Bintang Novandy
—	DF	IDN	Fiko Styohadi
—	DF	IDN	Emerson Dafajr Setiana
—	DF	IDN	Indra Lesmana Suteja
—	MF	IDN	Ahmad Dedi

No.	Pos.	Nation	Player
—	MF	IDN	Angga Pratama
—	MF	IDN	Ikbal Wahyu
—	MF	IDN	Putra Akbar Ramadhan Karsan
—	MF	IDN	Richard Arbed Anderson
—	MF	IDN	Bagas Prasetyo
—	MF	IDN	Figo Sapta Fahrezi
—	MF	IDN	Dicky Budi Kurniawan
—	MF	IDN	Eka Yudha Pratama
—	FW	IDN	Sabeq Fahmi Fachrezy
—	FW	IDN	Taufiq Hidayat
—	FW	IDN	Abdul Aziz
—	FW	IDN	Andika Ramadani
—	FW	IDN	Moch Bangkit
—	FW	IDN	Alvin Setiawan Saputra

== Honours ==
- Liga Indonesia Second Division
  - Winners (1): 2002–03
