= 2018 Liga 3 Regional Round =

Football competition round

The regional round of the 2018 Liga 3 was played in Indonesia from 24 September to 15 November 2018. 69 teams competed in the regional round, of whom to 12 qualified to participate in the national round of the competition along with 20 teams from the National Zone Route.

== Teams ==
The following 69 teams entered the regional winner route divided into seven regions:

**Sumatra Region**
Province	Teams
North Sumatra	**PSDS**
North Sumatra	Medan Utama
North Sumatra	PS Bhinneka
West Sumatra	**Solok**
West Sumatra	Batang Anai
Riau	**AS Abadi**
Riau	PS Petalangan
Riau Islands	**PS Putra Kundur**
Jambi	**Batanghari**
(Bangka Belitung Islands) Bangka Belitung	**PS Basel**
Bengkulu	**PS Benteng**
Lampung	**Putrad**
Lampung	SS Lampung

**Kalimantan Region**
Province	Teams
Central Kalimantan	**Persesam**
South Kalimantan	**Kotabaru**
South Kalimantan	Persetala
East Kalimantan	**PS PU**
East Kalimantan	Bontang City

**Lesser Sunda Islands Region**
Province	Teams
Bali	**Putra Tresna**
West Nusa Tenggara	**Perslotim**
East Nusa Tenggara	**PSN**
East Nusa Tenggara	PSK

**Java Region**
Province	Teams
Banten	**Persikota**
Banten	Persitangsel
Jakarta	**East Jakarta**
Jakarta	PRO-Direct
Jakarta	PSJS
West Java	**PSKC**
West Java	Persikab
West Java	Super Progresif
West Java	Persitas
West Java	Bintang Timur
West Java	Perssi
West Java	Maung Anom
West Java	Persikasi
Central Java	**PSIP**
Central Java	Persibara
Central Java	Persab
Central Java	BR Unika
Central Java	PSD
East Java	**Persiga**
East Java	Persekabpas
East Java	PS KoPa
East Java	Deltras
East Java	Blitar Poetra
East Java	Persem
East Java	Persedikab
East Java	PSID
East Java	Putra Sinar Giri
East Java	Lamongan
East Java	Persema 1953

**Sulawesi Region**
Province	Teams
North Sulawesi	**Persmin**
North Sulawesi	Persma 1960
Central Sulawesi	**Persido**
South Sulawesi	**Palopo United**
South Sulawesi	Persibone
Southeast Sulawesi	**PS Wonua Bombana**
Gorontalo	**Kreasindo XIII Merdeka**
West Sulawesi	**OTP37**

**Maluku Region**
Province	Teams
(Maluku (province)) Maluku	**Ambon United**
North Maluku	**Persiter**

**Papua Region**
Province	Teams
(West Papua (province)) West Papua	**Persikos**
(West Papua (province)) West Papua	Persiss
(West Papua (province)) West Papua	Persisos
(Papua (province)) Papua	**Persemi**
(Papua (province)) Papua	Persewar
(Papua (province)) Papua	Persitoli
(Papua (province)) Papua	Nafri
(Papua (province)) Papua	Persemar

Note:

- BOLD: Winner of each provincial league.

== Schedule ==
The schedule of each round were as follows.

Round	Match date
Regional round	24 September – 6 November 2018
Preliminary round	6 – 15 November 2018

== Regional round ==
=== Sumatra ===
A total of 13 teams played in Sumatra regional round. Four best teams from this region advanced to preliminary round. This region was played from 29 September – 21 October 2018.

First round
Team 1	Agg.	Team 2	1st leg	2nd leg
PSDS (North Sumatra)	Bye	N/A	N/A	N/A
Solok (West Sumatra)	2–2 (a)	(North Sumatra) PS Bhinneka	1–0	1–2
Batanghari (Jambi)	2–8	(West Sumatra) Batang Anai	2–2	0–6
Medan Utama (North Sumatra)	Bye	N/A	N/A	N/A
PS Putra Kundur (Riau Islands)	2–2 (4–3 p)	(Riau) PS Petalangan	2–0	0–2 (a.e.t.)
AS Abadi (Riau)	w/o (Note: SS Lampung withdrew from competition before the start of the 1st leg. As a result, AS Abadi qualified for the next round.)	SS Lampung	N/A	N/A
PS Basel (Bangka Belitung Islands)	1–0	(Lampung) Putrad	0–0	1–0
PS Benteng (Bengkulu)	Bye	N/A	N/A	N/A

Second round
Team 1	Agg.	Team 2	1st leg	2nd leg
PSDS (North Sumatra)	w/o (Note: PSDS refused to continue the match of the 2nd leg that stopped at 84th minute due to supporter's riot when the score's still 0–0. PSDS declared lose 0–3. Solok qualified for the next round.)	(West Sumatra) Solok	0–0	w/o
Batang Anai (West Sumatra)	3–5	(North Sumatra) Medan Utama	1–1	2–4
PS Putra Kundur (Riau Islands)	w/o (Note: AS Abadi declared a walkover win because PS Putra Kundur didn't have enough player to compete for the 2nd leg. AS Abadi qualified for the next round.)	(Riau) AS Abadi	0–0	w/o
PS Basel (Bangka Belitung Islands)	4–2	(Bengkulu) PS Benteng	4–1	0–1

=== Java ===
A total of 29 teams played in Java regional round. Eight best teams from this region advanced to preliminary round. This region was played from 24 September – 27 October 2018.

First round
Team 1	Agg.	Team 2	1st leg	2nd leg
PRO-Direct (Jakarta)	2–2 (a)	(West Java) Perssi	2–1	0–1
Persikab (West Java)	3–6	(West Java) Bintang Timur	3–5	0–1
Persikota (Banten)	1–3	(West Java) Maung Anom	1–2	0–1
Persem (East Java)	3–1	(West Java) Persikasi	2–1	1–0
Persekabpas (East Java)	5–0	(Jakarta) PSJS	4–0	1–0
Persibara (Central Java)	4–2	(Central Java) BR Unika	3–1	1–1
Persiga (East Java)	1–2	(East Java) Persedikab	1–1	0–1
Persab (Central Java)	Bye	N/A	N/A	N/A
East Jakarta	w/o (Note: East Jakarta withdrew from competition before the start of the 2nd leg. As a result, Persema 1953 qualified for the next round.)	(East Java) Persema 1953	0–2	w/o
Deltras (East Java)	8–1	(East Java) Lamongan	5–0	3–1
Persitas (West Java)	2–6	(Central Java) PSD	1–3	1–3
PSKC (West Java)	Bye	N/A	N/A	N/A
Super Progresif (West Java)	0–3	(East Java) PSID	0–3	0–0
Persitangsel (Banten)	1–4	(East Java) Putra Sinar Giri	0–2	1–2
PSIP (Central Java)	3–2	(East Java) Blitar Poetra	2–2	1–0
PS KoPa (East Java)	Bye	N/A	N/A	N/A

Second round
Team 1	Agg.	Team 2	1st leg	2nd leg
Perssi (West Java)	4–0	(West Java) Bintang Timur	0–0	4–0
Maung Anom (West Java)	0–3	(East Java) Persem	0–1	0–2
Persekabpas (East Java)	3–5	(Central Java) Persibara	3–2	0–3
Persedikab (East Java)	3–3 (a)	(Central Java) Persab	1–0	2–3
Persema 1953 (East Java)	3–2	(East Java) Deltras	1–0	2–2
PSD (Central Java)	0–0 (3–4 p)	(West Java) PSKC	0–0	0–0 (a.e.t.)
PSID (East Java)	3–3 (a)	(East Java) Putra Sinar Giri	1–0	2–3
PSIP (Central Java)	4–4 (a)	(East Java) PS KoPa	4–3	0–1

=== Kalimantan ===
A total of five teams played in Kalimantan regional round. Three best teams from this region advanced to preliminary round. This region was played from 3–10 October 2018.

Team 1	Agg.	Team 2	1st leg	2nd leg
PS PU (East Kalimantan)	8–3 (Note: Bontang City had been punished by PSSI Disciplinary Committee due to fielded illegal player. They originally lose 0–1 in 1st leg and won 3–1 in 2nd leg, made it a 3–2 win on aggregate. But as punishment result, PS PU score was added 3 goals. Therefore PS PU advanced to the next round.)	(East Kalimantan) Bontang City	4–0	4–3
Persesam (Central Kalimantan)	2–4	(South Kalimantan) Persetala	1–0	1–4
Kotabaru (South Kalimantan)	Bye	N/A	N/A	N/A

=== Sulawesi ===
A total of eight teams play in Sulawesi regional round. Three best teams from this region advanced to preliminary round. This region was played from 1 October – 6 November 2018.

First round
Team 1	Agg.	Team 2	1st leg	2nd leg
Persmin (North Sulawesi)	4–0	(North Sulawesi) Persma 1960	3–0	1–0
Kreasindo XIII Merdeka (Gorontalo)	2–1	(Central Sulawesi) Persido	2–1	0–0
PS Wonua Bombana (Southeast Sulawesi)	3–6	(South Sulawesi) Palopo United	1–3	2–3
Persibone (South Sulawesi)	0–2	(West Sulawesi) OTP37	0–1	0–1

Second round
Team 1	Agg.	Team 2	1st leg	2nd leg
Persmin (North Sulawesi)	0–2	(Gorontalo) Kreasindo XIII Merdeka	0–0	0–2
Palopo United (South Sulawesi)	0–1	(West Sulawesi) OTP37	0–0	0–1

Play-off for advance
Team 1	Score	Team 2
Persmin (North Sulawesi)	5–2	(South Sulawesi) Palopo United

=== Lesser Sunda Islands ===
A total of four teams played in Lesser Sunda Islands regional round. Two best teams from this region advanced to preliminary round. This region was played from 6–20 October 2018.

Team 1	Agg.	Team 2	1st leg	2nd leg
Putra Tresna (Bali)	w/o (Note: PSK withdrew from competition before the start of the 1st leg. As a result, Putra Tresna qualified for the next round.)	(East Nusa Tenggara) PSK	—	—
Perslotim (West Nusa Tenggara)	0–2	(East Nusa Tenggara) PSN	0–0	0–2

=== Maluku ===
A total of two teams played in Maluku regional round. The best team from this region advanced to preliminary round. This region was played from 6–21 October 2018.

Team 1	Agg.	Team 2	1st leg	2nd leg
Ambon United (Maluku (province))	0–2	(North Maluku) Persiter	0–0	0–2

=== Papua ===
A total of eight teams play in Papua regional round. Three best teams from this region advanced to preliminary round. This region was played from 1 October – 3 November 2018.

First round
Team 1	Agg.	Team 2	1st leg	2nd leg
Persemar (Papua (province))	1–11	(Papua (province)) Persemi	1–5	0–6
Persitoli (Papua (province))	2–1	(Papua (province)) Nafri	1–1	1–0
Persiss (West Papua (province))	0–5	(Papua (province)) Persewar	0–0	0–5
Persisos (West Papua (province))	2–0	(West Papua (province)) Persikos	0–0	2–0

Second round
Team 1	Agg.	Team 2	1st leg	2nd leg
Persemi (Papua (province))	4–1	(Papua (province)) Persitoli	2–1	2–0
Persewar (Papua (province))	4–3	(West Papua (province)) Persisos	4–2	0–1

Play-off for advance
Team 1	Score	Team 2
Persitoli (Papua (province))	3–0	(West Papua (province)) Persisos

== Preliminary round ==
A total of 24 teams played in this round. This round was played from 6–15 November 2018.

Team 1	Agg.	Team 2	1st leg	2nd leg
Solok (West Sumatra)	3–1	(North Sumatra) Medan Utama	2–1	1–0
AS Abadi (Riau)	5–2	(Bangka Belitung Islands) PS Basel	3–2	2–0
Perssi (West Java)	0–3	(East Java) Persem	0–0	0–3
Persibara (Central Java)	2–3	(East Java) Persedikab	2–1	0–2
Persema 1953 (East Java)	2–0	(West Java) PSKC	2–0	0–0
PSID (East Java)	2–2 (a)	(East Java) PS KoPa	1–0	1–2
Persetala (South Kalimantan)	1–5	(South Kalimantan) Kotabaru	1–0	0–5
PS PU (East Kalimantan)	w/o (Note: PS PU withdrew from competition before the start of the 1st leg. As a result, OTP37 qualified for national round.)	(West Sulawesi) OTP37	—	—
Kreasindo XIII Merdeka (Gorontalo)	3–2	(North Sulawesi) Persmin	1–0	2–2
Putra Tresna (Bali)	0–2	(East Nusa Tenggara) PSN	0–2	0–0
Persiter (North Maluku)	3–4	(Papua (province)) Persitoli	3–1	0–3
Persemi (Papua (province))	3–3 (a)	(Papua (province)) Persewar	3–3	0–0

== Qualified teams ==
The following teams qualified from regional route for the national round.

Qualified teams	Province	Qualified on
OTP37	West Sulawesi	6 November 2018
Solok	West Sumatra	13 November 2018
PSID	East Java	13 November 2018
Kotabaru	South Kalimantan	13 November 2018
Persewar	Papua	13 November 2018
Persitoli	Papua	14 November 2018
Persema 1953	East Java	14 November 2018
AS Abadi	Riau	14 November 2018
PSN	East Nusa Tenggara	15 November 2018
Kreasindo XIII Merdeka	Gorontalo	15 November 2018
Persedikab	East Java	15 November 2018
Persem	East Java	15 November 2018
