= 2018 in Indonesian football =

Football in Indonesia
- Season: 2018

Men's football
- Liga 1: Persija
- Liga 2: PSS
- Liga 3: Persik

The 2018 season of competitive association football in Indonesia.

== Promotion and relegation ==
League	Promoted to league	Relegated from league
Liga 1	Persebaya Surabaya; PSMS Medan; PSIS Semarang	Persegres Gresik United; Persiba Balikpapan; Semen Padang
Liga 2	Blitar United; Persik Kendal; Aceh United	38 teams to Liga 3 + 2 teams disqualified

== National teams ==
=== Men's national football team ===
==== Friendlies ====
===== International Friendlies =====
14 January Non-FIFA Matchday	Indonesia	1−4	Iceland	Jakarta, Indonesia
19:00 UTC+7	Armaiyn 29'	Report	Guðmundsson 45+2', 66', 72'; Smárason 59'	Stadium: Gelora Bung Karno Stadium; Attendance: 36,220; Referee: Yusuke Araki (Japan)

11 September	Indonesia	1–0	Mauritius	Cikarang, Indonesia
16:30 UTC+7	Darmono 90'	Report		Stadium: Wibawa Mukti Stadium; Attendance: 12,621; Referee: Minoru Tōjō (Japan)

10 October	Indonesia	3–0	Myanmar	Cikarang, Indonesia
18:30 UTC+7	Gonçalves 19'; Irfan 26', 40'	Report		Stadium: Wibawa Mukti Stadium; Attendance: 4,217; Referee: Hiroyuki Kimura (Japan)

16 October	Indonesia	1–1	Hong Kong	Cikarang, Indonesia
18:30 UTC+7	Gonçalves 40'	Report	Baise 69'	Stadium: Wibawa Mukti Stadium; Attendance: 3,729; Referee: Lim Bunthoeun (Cambodia)

==== 2018 AFF Championship ====
===== Group B =====
Pos	Team	Pld	W	D	L	GF	GA	GD	Pts	Qualification
1	Thailand	4	3	1	0	15	3	+12	10	Knockout phase
2	Philippines	4	2	2	0	5	3	+2	8	Knockout phase
3	Singapore	4	2	0	2	7	5	+2	6	
4	Indonesia	4	1	1	2	5	6	−1	4	
5	Timor-Leste	4	0	0	4	4	19	−15	0	

Source: AFF

9 November Group B	Singapore	1–0	Indonesia	Kallang, Singapore
20:00 UTC+8	Hariss 37'	Report		Stadium: National Stadium; Attendance: 30,783; Referee: Nguyễn Hiền Triết (Vietnam)

13 November Group B	Indonesia	3–1	Timor-Leste	Jakarta, Indonesia
19:00 UTC+7	Alfath 60'; Lilipaly 69' (pen.); Gonçalves 82'	Report	Gama 48'	Stadium: Gelora Bung Karno Stadium; Attendance: 15,138; Referee: Aziz Asimov (Uzbekistan)

17 November Group B	Thailand	4–2	Indonesia	Bangkok, Thailand
18:30 UTC+7	Korrakot 38'; Pansa 45+2'; Adisak 65'; Pokklaw 74'	Report	Zulfiandi 29'; Fachrudin 89'	Stadium: Rajamangala Stadium; Attendance: 37,570; Referee: Amirul Izwan Yaacob (Malaysia)

25 November Group B	Indonesia	0–0	Philippines	Jakarta, Indonesia
19:00 UTC+7		Report		Stadium: Gelora Bung Karno Stadium; Attendance: 15,436; Referee: Fu Ming (China)

=== Men's under-23 football team ===
==== Friendlies ====
===== International Friendlies =====
21 March	Singapore	0–3	Indonesia	Kallang, Singapore
19:30 UTC+8		Report	Febri 44'; Hargianto 51'; Septian 65'	Stadium: National Stadium; Referee: Muhammad Taqi Aljaafari (Singapore)

31 May	Indonesia	1–2	Thailand	Jakarta, Indonesia
21:30 UTC+7	Septian 48'	Report	Sansern 52'; Tanasith 88'	Stadium: PTIK Stadium; Referee: Oki Dwi Putra (Indonesia)

3 June	Indonesia	0–0	Thailand	Cibinong, Indonesia
21:30 UTC+7		Report		Stadium: Pakansari Stadium; Referee: Dwi Purba (Indonesia)

23 June	Indonesia	1–2	South Korea	Cibinong, Indonesia
19:00 UTC+7	Hansamu 90+2'	Report	Jeong Tae-wook 43'; Han Seung-gyu 90+6'	Stadium: Pakansari Stadium; Referee: Thoriq Alkatiri (Indonesia)

===== Non-International Friendlies =====
24 February	Indonesia	5–0	Indonesia U-19	Jakarta, Indonesia
08:00 UTC+7	Yabes 10'; Febri 18'; Hanif 48'; Osvaldo 65'; Hardianto 88'	Report		Stadium: ABC Field; Attendance: 0

==== 2018 PSSI Anniversary Cup ====
Pos	Team	Pld	W	D	L	GF	GA	GD	Pts	Result
1	Bahrain	3	2	1	0	8	4	+4	7	Champion
2	Uzbekistan	3	0	3	0	5	5	0	3	Runner–up
3	Indonesia (H)	3	0	2	1	0	1	−1	2	Third place
4	North Korea	3	0	2	1	3	6	−3	2	

Source: Football Association of Indonesia
Rules for classification: 1) Points; 2) Head-to-head; 3) Goal difference; 4) Goals scored; 5) Fair-play points; 6) Penalty shoot-out
(H) Hosts

27 April Matchday 1	Indonesia	0–1	Bahrain	Cibinong, Indonesia
19:30 UTC+7	Rezaldi (red card) 90+3'	Report	Marhoon 5'	Stadium: Pakansari Stadium; Referee: Luk Kin Sun (Hong Kong)

30 April Matchday 2	Indonesia	0–0	North Korea	Cibinong, Indonesia
19:30 UTC+7		Report		Stadium: Pakansari Stadium; Referee: Khuon Virak (Cambodia)

3 May Matchday 3	Indonesia	0–0	Uzbekistan	Cibinong, Indonesia
19:30 UTC+7		Report		Stadium: Pakansari Stadium; Referee: Luk Kin Sun (Hong Kong)

==== 2018 Asian Games ====
===== Group A =====
Pos	Team	Pld	W	D	L	GF	GA	GD	Pts	Qualification
1	Indonesia (H)	4	3	0	1	11	3	+8	9	Advance to knockout stage
2	Palestine	4	2	2	0	5	3	+2	8	Advance to knockout stage
3	Hong Kong	4	2	1	1	9	5	+4	7	Advance to knockout stage
4	Laos	4	1	0	3	4	8	−4	3	
5	Chinese Taipei	4	0	1	3	0	10	−10	1	

Source: Asian Games 2018
Rules for classification: Group stage tiebreakers
(H) Hosts

12 August Group A	Chinese Taipei	0–4	Indonesia	Bekasi, Indonesia
19:00 UTC+7		Report	Lilipaly 67', 76'; Gonçalves 71'; Hargianto 90+3'	Stadium: Patriot Candrabhaga Stadium, Bekasi; Referee: Ammar Mahfoodh (Bahrain)

15 August Group A	Indonesia	1–2	Palestine	Bekasi, Indonesia
19:00 UTC+7	Irfan 23'	Report	Dabbagh 16'; Darwish 51'	Stadium: Patriot Candrabhaga Stadium, Bekasi; Referee: Nivon Robesh Gamini (Sri Lanka)

17 August Group A	Laos	0–3	Indonesia	Bekasi, Indonesia
19:00 UTC+7		Report	Gonçalves 14', 47'; Fajrin 75'	Stadium: Patriot Candrabhaga Stadium, Bekasi; Referee: Zaid Thamer Mohammed (Iraq)

20 August Group A	Indonesia	3–1	Hong Kong	Bekasi, Indonesia
19:00 UTC+7	Irfan 46'; Lilipaly 85'; Hanif 90+4'	Report	Lau Hok Ming 39'	Stadium: Patriot Candrabhaga Stadium, Bekasi; Referee: Aziz Asimov (Uzbekistan)

===== Knockout stage =====
24 August Round of 16	Indonesia	2–2 (a.e.t.) (3–4 p)	United Arab Emirates	Cikarang, Indonesia
16:00 UTC+7	Gonçalves 52'; Lilipaly 90+5'	Report	Z. Al-Ameri 20' (pen.), 65' (pen.)	Stadium: Wibawa Mukti Stadium, Cikarang; Referee: Shaun Evans (Australia)
	Penalties
	Lilipaly (penalty scored); Septian (penalty missed); Gonçalves (penalty scored); Ramdani (penalty missed); Hargianto (penalty scored)		(penalty scored) Al-Attas; (penalty scored) Z. Al-Ameri; (penalty scored) Ibrahim; (penalty missed) Ghanem; (penalty scored) Omar

=== Men's under-19 football team ===
==== Friendlies ====
===== International Friendlies =====
25 March	Indonesia	1–4	Japan	Jakarta, Indonesia
19:30 UTC+7	Kusuma 90+4'	Report	Miyashiro 16'; Yamada 48'; Ando 49', 80' (pen.)	Stadium: Gelora Bung Karno Stadium; Referee: Yudi Nurcahya (Indonesia)

10 October	Indonesia	1–2	Saudi Arabia	Cikarang, Indonesia
15:45 UTC+7	Saddil 45+1'	Report	Abdullah 37', 67' (pen.)	Stadium: Wibawa Mukti Stadium; Referee: Aprisman Aranda (Indonesia)

13 October	Indonesia	3–2	Jordan	Cikarang, Indonesia
15:30 UTC+7	Firza 45', 74'; Saif 56' (o.g.)	Report	Abdel 79', 87'	Stadium: Wibawa Mukti Stadium; Referee: Lim Bunthoeun (Cambodia)

===== Non-International Friendlies =====
24 February	Indonesia U-23	5–0	Indonesia	Jakarta, Indonesia
08:00 UTC+7	Yabes 10'; Febri 18'; Hanif 48'; Osvaldo 65'; Hardianto 88'	Report		Stadium: ABC Field; Attendance: 0

28 May	Persis (Indonesia)	3–0	Indonesia	Surakarta, Indonesia
20:30 UTC+7	Handoko 24'; Nurhidayat 83' (o.g.); Johan Yoga 90+2'	Report		Stadium: Manahan Stadium

2 June	PSS (Indonesia)	2–0	Indonesia	Sleman, Indonesia
20:30 UTC+7	Slamet 42'; Ichsan 57'	Report		Stadium: Maguwoharjo Stadium

27 June	Persiba Bantul (Indonesia)	1–3	Indonesia	Bantul, Indonesia
20:30 UTC+7	Arif 86'	Report	Ferre 4'; Witan 15'; Saghara 60'	Stadium: Sultan Agung Stadium

==== 2018 AFF U-19 Youth Championship ====
===== Group A =====
Pos	Team	Pld	W	D	L	GF	GA	GD	Pts	Qualification
1	Thailand	5	4	1	0	16	1	+15	13	Knockout stage
2	Indonesia (H)	5	4	0	1	11	3	+8	12	Knockout stage
3	Vietnam	5	2	2	1	11	4	+7	8	
4	Laos	5	2	0	3	13	10	+3	6	
5	Philippines	5	1	0	4	5	22	−17	3	
6	Singapore	5	0	1	4	3	19	−16	1	

Source: drawing result
(H) Hosts

1 July Group A	Indonesia	1–0	Laos	Sidoarjo, Indonesia
19:00 UTC+7	Witan 30'	Report	Phasao (red card) 90+2'	Stadium: Gelora Delta Stadium, Sidoarjo; Attendance: 13,774; Referee: Myat Thu (Myanmar)

3 July Group A	Indonesia	4–0	Singapore	Sidoarjo, Indonesia
19:00 UTC+7	Rafli 21', 61'; Saddil 70'; Rivaldo 80'	Report		Stadium: Gelora Delta Stadium, Sidoarjo; Attendance: 17,000; Referee: Clifford Daypuyat (Philippines)

5 July Group A	Philippines	1–4	Indonesia	Sidoarjo, Indonesia
19:00 UTC+7	Pabualan 33'	Report	Saddil 82', 86'; Firza 83'; Rivaldo 90'	Stadium: Gelora Delta Stadium, Sidoarjo; Attendance: 16,950; Referee: Razlan Jeffri Ali (Malaysia)

7 July Group A	Indonesia	1–0	Vietnam	Sidoarjo, Indonesia
19:00 UTC+7	Rafli 81'	Report		Stadium: Gelora Delta Stadium, Sidoarjo; Attendance: 25,000; Referee: Razlan Jeffri Ali (Malaysia)

9 July Group A	Thailand	2–1	Indonesia	Sidoarjo, Indonesia
19:00 UTC+7	Nattawut 41'; Matee 50'	Report	Rifad 84'	Stadium: Gelora Delta Stadium, Sidoarjo; Attendance: 26,000; Referee: Clifford Daypuyat (Philippines)

===== Knockout stage =====
12 July Semi-finals	Malaysia	1–1 (3–2 p)	Indonesia	Sidoarjo, Indonesia
19:00 UTC+7	Syaiful 15'	Report	Egy 1' (pen.)	Stadium: Gelora Delta Stadium, Sidoarjo; Attendance: 26,233; Referee: Clifford Daypuyat (Philippines)
	Penalties
	Shivan (penalty scored); Nabil (penalty scored); Akif (penalty scored); Zafuan (penalty missed)		(penalty scored) Luthfi; (penalty scored) Rivaldo; (penalty missed) Witan; (penalty missed) Firza; (penalty missed) Hanis

14 July Third place match	Thailand	1–2	Indonesia	Sidoarjo, Indonesia
15:30 UTC+7	Matee 85'	Report	Feby 34'; Abimanyu 83'	Stadium: Gelora Delta Stadium, Sidoarjo; Attendance: 3,123; Referee: Xaypaseuth Phongsanit (Laos)

==== 2018 AFC U-19 Championship ====
===== Group A =====
Pos	Team	Pld	W	D	L	GF	GA	GD	Pts	Qualification
1	Qatar	3	2	0	1	11	7	+4	6 (Note: Head-to-head results: United Arab Emirates 2–1 Qatar, Qatar 6–5 Indonesia, Indonesia 1–0 United Arab Emirates. Head-to-head standings: Qatar: 3 pts, 0 GD, 7 GF; Indonesia: 3 pts, 0 GD, 6 GF; United Arab Emirates: 3 pts, 0 GD, 2 GF)	Knockout stage
2	Indonesia (H)	3	2	0	1	9	7	+2	6	Knockout stage
3	United Arab Emirates	3	2	0	1	10	3	+7	6	
4	Chinese Taipei	3	0	0	3	2	15	−13	0	

Source: AFC
Rules for classification: Group stage tiebreakers
(H) Hosts
Notes:

18 October Group A	Indonesia	3–1	Chinese Taipei	Jakarta, Indonesia
19:00 UTC+7	Egy 50'; Witan 70', 89'	Report	Wang Chung-yu 53'	Stadium: Gelora Bung Karno Stadium; Attendance: 17,320; Referee: Mooud Bonyadifar (Iran)

21 October Group A	Qatar	6–5	Indonesia	Jakarta, Indonesia
19:00 UTC+7	Ali 11', 51'; Umaru 14', 41', 56'; Waad 24'	Report	Luthfi 28'; Rivaldo 65', 73', 81'; Saddil 69'	Stadium: Gelora Bung Karno Stadium; Attendance: 38,217; Referee: Sivakorn Pu-udom (Thailand)

24 October Group A	Indonesia	1–0	United Arab Emirates	Jakarta, Indonesia
19:00 UTC+7	Witan 23'	Report		Stadium: Gelora Bung Karno Stadium; Attendance: 30,022; Referee: Kim Hee-gon (South Korea)

===== Knockout stage =====
28 October Quarter-finals	Japan	2–0	Indonesia	Jakarta, Indonesia
19:30 UTC+7	Higashi 40'; Miyashiro 70'	Report		Stadium: Gelora Bung Karno Stadium; Attendance: 60,154; Referee: Mooud Bonyadifar (Iran)

=== Men's under-16 football team ===
==== Friendlies ====
===== International Friendlies =====
6 July	Malaysia	4–3	Indonesia	Petaling Jaya, Malaysia
	Haiqal 8'; Alif 24' (pen.); Amirul 37'; Akmal 65'	Report	Yadi 27'; David 56' (pen.); Firdaus 80' (o.g.)	Stadium: Petaling Jaya Stadium

12 September	Indonesia	3–3	Oman	Nilai, Malaysia
	Bagus (?)	Report	Fahad (?); Qusai (?); Omar (?)	Stadium: USIM Stadium

===== Non-International Friendlies =====
25 January	Indonesia	2–0	(Indonesia) Bina Sentra	Jakarta, Indonesia
07:30 UTC+7	Maulana (?); Supriadi (?)	Report		Stadium: Atang Sutresna Stadium

26 January	Indonesia	1–2	(Indonesia) Diklat Ragunan	Jakarta, Indonesia
15:00 UTC+7	M. Iqbal (?)	Report	M. Ridwan (?); M. Hasan (?)	Stadium: Atang Sutresna Stadium

27 January	Indonesia	3–4	(Indonesia) PPLP DKI	Jakarta, Indonesia
07:30 UTC+7	? (?); ? (?); ? (?)	Report	? (?); ? (?); ? (?); ? (?)	Stadium: Atang Sutresna Stadium

24 February	Indonesia	2–3	(Indonesia) Diklat Ragunan	Jakarta, Indonesia
07:30 UTC+7	Lestaluhu (?); Juliansyah (?)	Report	? (?); ? (?); ? (?)	Stadium: Atang Sutresna Stadium

24 February	Indonesia	9–0	(Indonesia) West Persija	Jakarta, Indonesia
15:30 UTC+7	Aldama (?); Abdillah (?); Zico (?); Juliansyah (?); Lestaluhu (?); Supriadi (?); Mulyadi (?); Setyawan (?)	Report		Stadium: Atang Sutresna Stadium

4 March	Indonesia	8–0	(Indonesia) Babek Academy	Jakarta, Indonesia
	Zico (?); Juliansyah (?); Pramudya (?); Fajar (?); Mulyadi (?); Lestaluhu (?); Aldama (?)	Report		Stadium: Atang Sutresna Stadium

9 May	Indonesia	5–2	(Indonesia) Diklat Ragunan	Jakarta, Indonesia
15:00 UTC+7	Bagus (?); Lestaluhu (?); Mulyadi (?)	Report	Witan (?); ? (?)	Stadium: Atang Sutresna Stadium

10 May	Indonesia	0–2	(Indonesia) Topskor League Selection	Jakarta, Indonesia
15:00 UTC+7		Report	Raihnan (?); Rohn (?)	Stadium: Atang Sutresna Stadium

20 June	Bhayangkara U17s (Indonesia)	1–6	Indonesia	Sidoarjo, Indonesia
07:30 UTC+7	Agung (?)	Report	Bagus 10'; Pramudya 20'; Mulyadi 43', 59'; Zico 82'; Vedhayanto 83'	Stadium: Jenggolo Stadium

1 July	Persida U17s (Indonesia)	2–5	Indonesia	Sidoarjo, Indonesia
15:00 UTC+7	? (?); ? (?)	Report	? (?); ? (?); ? (?); ? (?); ? (?)	Stadium: Jenggolo Stadium

8 July	Johor Darul Ta'zim U17s (Malaysia)	1–1	Indonesia	Petaling Jaya, Malaysia
	? (?)	Report	Oktaviansyah 54'	Stadium: Petaling Jaya Stadium

14 July	PSID U17s (Indonesia)	0–4	Indonesia	Jombang, Indonesia
		Report	Juliansyah 29'; Bagus 35'; Mulyadi 57'; Oktaviansyah 85'	Stadium: Merdeka Stadium

18 July	SSB Bligo Sidoarjo (Indonesia)	2–6	Indonesia	Sidoarjo, Indonesia
	? (?); ? (?)	Report	Bagus 2', 22' (pen.); Juliansyah 16', 26', 44'; Oktaviansyah 57'	Stadium: Jenggolo Stadium

20 July	ASIFA Academy (Indonesia)	0–4	Indonesia	Sidoarjo, Indonesia
		Report	Teguh 9', 52'; Bagus 30'; Vedhayanto 80'	Stadium: Gelora Delta Stadium

31 August	Sime Darby U17s (Malaysia)	0–4	Indonesia	Selayang, Malaysia
		Report	Aldama (?); Juliansyah (?); Supriadi (?); Bagus (?)	Stadium: MP Selayang Stadium

4 September	FELDA United U17s (Malaysia)	0–5	Indonesia	Cyberjaya, Malaysia
		Report	Bagus (?); Abdillah (?); Salman (?)	Stadium: MMU Stadium

==== 2018 JENESYS Tournament ====
===== Group B =====
Pos	Team	Pld	W	D	L	GF	GA	GD	Pts	Qualification
1	Indonesia	2	2	0	0	12	1	+11	6	Knockout phase
2	Cambodia	2	1	0	1	3	5	−2	3	Group stage second-place playoff
3	Philippines	2	0	0	2	1	10	−9	0	Group stage third-place playoff

Source: JFA

8 March Group B	Indonesia	7–1	Philippines	Miyazaki, Japan
10:30 UTC+9	Mulyadi 8'; Zico 15', 83'; Maulana 31', 64'; Teguh 68'; Bagas 79'	Report	? (?)	Stadium: Kirishima Yamazakura Miyazaki Prefectural Comprehensive Sports Park Pitch 2

9 March Group B	Indonesia	5–0	Cambodia	Miyazaki, Japan
14:00 UTC+9	Zico 2'; Lestaluhu 30', 78'; Supriadi 71', 73'	Report		Stadium: Kirishima Yamazakura Miyazaki Prefectural Comprehensive Sports Park Pitch 2

===== Knockout phase =====
11 March Semifinal	Japan	0–1	Indonesia	Miyazaki, Japan
16:00 UTC+9		Report	Zico 54'	Stadium: Kirishima Yamazakura Miyazaki Prefectural Comprehensive Sports Park Pitch 1

12 March Final	Indonesia	1–0	Vietnam	Miyazaki, Japan
14:00 UTC+9	Juliansyah 64' (pen.)	Report		Stadium: Kirishima Yamazakura Miyazaki Prefectural Comprehensive Sports Park Pitch 1

==== 2018 AFF U-16 Youth Championship ====
===== Group A =====
Pos	Team	Pld	W	D	L	GF	GA	GD	Pts	Qualification
1	Indonesia (H)	5	5	0	0	21	3	+18	15	Knockout stage
2	Myanmar	5	3	1	1	17	7	+10	10	Knockout stage
3	Vietnam	5	3	1	1	15	7	+8	10	
4	Timor-Leste	5	2	0	3	8	12	−4	6	
5	Cambodia	5	1	0	4	7	12	−5	3	
6	Philippines	5	0	0	5	3	30	−27	0	

Source: AFF
(H) Hosts

29 July Group A	Indonesia	8–0	Philippines	Sidoarjo, Indonesia
19:00 UTC+7	Supriadi 2'; Teguh 18'; Fajar 32'; Zico 45'; Rendy 56'; Maulana 63' (pen.); Bagus 67', 73'	Report		Stadium: Gelora Delta Stadium; Attendance: 8,931; Referee: Souei Vongkham (Laos)

31 July Group A	Myanmar	1–2	Indonesia	Sidoarjo, Indonesia
19:00 UTC+7	Zaw Win Thein 72' (pen.)	Report	Bagus 8', 26'	Stadium: Gelora Delta Stadium; Attendance: 8,745; Referee: Amdillah Zainuddin (Brunei)

2 August Group A	Vietnam	2–4	Indonesia	Sidoarjo, Indonesia
19:00 UTC+7	Trung 6', 73' (pen.); Nguyên Hoàng (red card) 66'	Report	Supriadi 29'; Bagus 45' (pen.), 61'; Oktaviansyah 80+4'; Bagas (yellow card) 66' (red card)	Stadium: Gelora Delta Stadium; Attendance: 9,588; Referee: Xaypaseuth Phongsanit (Laos)

4 August Group A	Indonesia	3–0	Timor-Leste	Sidoarjo, Indonesia
19:00 UTC+7	Bagus 49', 80+2'; Zico 72'	Report	Oscar (yellow card) 80+3' (yellow-red card)	Stadium: Gelora Delta Stadium; Attendance: 23,209; Referee: Wiwat Jumpaoon (Thailand)

6 August Group A	Cambodia	0–4	Indonesia	Sidoarjo, Indonesia
19:00 UTC+7		Report	Juliansyah 10'; Bagus 21', 33', 42' (pen.)	Stadium: Gelora Delta Stadium; Attendance: 15,343; Referee: Abdul Hakim Mohd Haidi (Brunei)

===== Knockout stage =====
9 August Semi-finals	Indonesia	1–0	Malaysia	Sidoarjo, Indonesia
19:00 UTC+7	Bagus 72' (pen.)	Report		Stadium: Gelora Delta Stadium; Attendance: 24,278; Referee: Ngô Duy Lân (Vietnam)

11 August Final	Indonesia	1–1 (4–3 p)	Thailand	Sidoarjo, Indonesia
19:00 UTC+7	Fajar 33'	Report	Apidet 72'	Stadium: Gelora Delta Stadium; Attendance: 26,698; Referee: Souei Vongkham (Laos)
	Penalties
	Zico (penalty scored); Bagus (penalty scored); Juliansyah (penalty scored); Maulana (penalty scored)		(penalty scored) Thanarin; (penalty missed) Apidet; (penalty scored) Anucha; (penalty scored) Kittiphong; (penalty missed) Pongsakorn

==== 2018 AFC U-16 Championship ====
===== Group C =====
Pos	Team	Pld	W	D	L	GF	GA	GD	Pts	Qualification
1	Indonesia	3	1	2	0	3	1	+2	5	Knockout stage
2	India	3	1	2	0	1	0	+1	5	Knockout stage
3	Iran	3	1	1	1	5	2	+3	4	
4	Vietnam	3	0	1	2	1	7	−6	1	

Source: AFC
Rules for classification: Group stage tiebreakers

11 September Group C	Iran	0–2	Indonesia	Kuala Lumpur, Malaysia
16:30 UTC+8		Report	Bagus 4'; Bagas 90+1'	Stadium: Bukit Jalil National Stadium; Attendance: 3,431; Referee: Kim Woo-sung (South Korea)

14 September Group C	Indonesia	1–1	Vietnam	Kuala Lumpur, Malaysia
20:45 UTC+8	Zico 49'	Report	Khang 30'	Stadium: Bukit Jalil National Stadium; Attendance: 11,201; Referee: Ahmad Yacoub Ibrahim (Jordan)

17 September Group C	India	0–0	Indonesia	Kuala Lumpur, Malaysia
20:45 UTC+8		Report		Stadium: Bukit Jalil National Stadium; Attendance: 11,388; Referee: Ahmad Yacoub Ibrahim (Jordan)

===== Knockout stage =====
1 October Quarter-finals	Indonesia	2–3	Australia	Kuala Lumpur, Malaysia
16:30 UTC+8	Zico 17'; Rendy 89'	Report	Walsh 51'; Leombruno 65'; Botic 74'	Stadium: Bukit Jalil National Stadium; Attendance: 13,743; Referee: Kim Woo-sung (South Korea)

=== Women's football team ===
==== Friendlies ====
===== International Friendlies =====
27 May	Indonesia	0–13	Thailand	Palembang, Indonesia
20.30 UTC+7		Report		Stadium: Gelora Sriwijaya Stadium

30 May	Indonesia	0–3	Thailand	Palembang, Indonesia
20.30 UTC+7		Report		Stadium: Gelora Sriwijaya Stadium

==== 2018 AFF Women's Championship ====
===== Group B =====
Pos	Team	Pld	W	D	L	GF	GA	GD	Pts	Qualification
1	Vietnam	4	4	0	0	25	3	+22	12	Knockout stage
2	Myanmar	4	3	0	1	20	5	+15	9	Knockout stage
3	Philippines	4	1	1	2	6	12	−6	4	
4	Indonesia (H)	4	0	2	2	4	15	−11	2	
5	Singapore	4	0	1	3	0	20	−20	1	

Source: AFF
Rules for classification: Group stage tiebreakers
(H) Hosts

1 July Group B	Singapore	0–0	Indonesia	Palembang, Indonesia
19:00 UTC+7		Report		Stadium: Gelora Sriwijaya Stadium; Attendance: 200; Referee: Pansa Chaisanit (Thailand)

3 July Group B	Indonesia	0–6	Vietnam	Palembang, Indonesia
16:00 UTC+7		Report	Huỳnh Như 2', 52'; Fan 28'; Yến 41'; Thao 48'; Tuyết Dung 63'	Stadium: Gelora Sriwijaya Stadium; Attendance: 100; Referee: Thein Thein Aye (Myanmar)

5 July Group B	Myanmar	6–1	Indonesia	Palembang, Indonesia
19:00 UTC+7	Win Theingi Tun 4', 12', 56', 65'; Thandar Moe 24'; July Kyaw 84'	Report	Sada 66'	Stadium: Gelora Sriwijaya Stadium; Attendance: 200; Referee: Pansa Chaisanit (Thailand)

9 July Group B	Indonesia	3–3	Philippines	Palembang, Indonesia
16:00 UTC+7	Zahra 54'; Mayang 63'; Syenida 82'	Report	Inquig 9'; Semacio 14'; Madarang 90+5'	Stadium: Gelora Sriwijaya Stadium; Attendance: 100; Referee: Pansa Chaisanit (Thailand)

==== 2018 Asian Games ====
===== Group A =====
Pos	Team	Pld	W	D	L	GF	GA	GD	Pts	Qualification
1	South Korea	3	3	0	0	22	1	+21	9	Advance to Knockout stage
2	Chinese Taipei	3	2	0	1	12	2	+10	6	Advance to Knockout stage
3	Indonesia (H)	3	1	0	2	6	16	−10	3	
4	Maldives	3	0	0	3	0	21	−21	0	

Source: Asian Games 2018
Rules for classification: Group stage tiebreakers
(H) Hosts

16 August Group A	Indonesia	6–0	Maldives	Palembang, Indonesia
18:30 UTC+7	Musdalifah 10', 72'; Zp 15' (pen.), 55'; Sada 30'; Sari 61'	Report		Stadium: Gelora Sriwijaya Stadium; Referee: Thein Thein Aye (Myanmar)

19 August Group A	Chinese Taipei	4–0	Indonesia	Palembang, Indonesia
18:30 UTC+7	Yu Hsiu-chin 5'; Chan Pi-han 16'; Lin Ya-han 33'; Michelle Pao 39'	Report		Stadium: Gelora Sriwijaya Stadium; Referee: Asaka Matsushita (Japan)

21 August Group A	Indonesia	0–12	South Korea	Palembang, Indonesia
18:30 UTC+7		Report	Lee Hyun-young 4' (pen.), 38', 47', 71', 90'; Moon Mi-ra 11', 37'; Lim Seon-joo 14'; Son Hwa-yeon 48'; Jang Sel-gi 67'; Ji So-yun 88', 90+2'	Stadium: Gelora Sriwijaya Stadium; Referee: Mahsa Ghorbani (Iran)

=== Women's under-16 football team ===
==== 2018 AFF U-16 Girls' Championship ====
===== Group B =====
Pos	Team	Pld	W	D	L	GF	GA	GD	Pts	Qualification
1	Thailand	3	3	0	0	9	1	+8	9	Knockout stage
2	Laos	3	2	0	1	5	2	+3	6	Knockout stage
3	Indonesia (H)	3	1	0	2	3	6	−3	3	
4	Cambodia	3	0	0	3	1	9	−8	0	

Source: AFF
(H) Hosts

2 May Group B	Thailand	4–1	Indonesia	Palembang, Indonesia
16:00 UTC+7	Jinantuya 22'; Pratumkul 28'; Sontisawat 68'; Khamjaroen 74'	Report	Sefia 3'	Stadium: Bumi Sriwijaya Stadium; Attendance: 800; Referee: Bui Thi Thu Trang (Vietnam)

4 May Group B	Indonesia	2–0	Cambodia	Palembang, Indonesia
16:00 UTC+7	Firanda 31', 71'	Report		Stadium: Bumi Sriwijaya Stadium; Attendance: 200; Referee: Seinn Cho Aung (Myanmar)

6 May Group B	Laos	2–0	Indonesia	Palembang, Indonesia
16:00 UTC+7	Pe 4'; Khounsy 51'	Report		Stadium: Gelora Sriwijaya Stadium; Attendance: 820; Referee: Thein Thein Aye (Myanmar)

== League season ==
=== Liga 1 ===
Locations of the 2018 Liga 1 teams

Pos	Team	Pld	W	D	L	GF	GA	GD	Pts	Qualification or relegation
1	Persija (C)	34	18	8	8	53	36	+17	62	Qualification for the AFC Champions League preliminary round 1
2	PSM	34	17	10	7	57	42	+15	61	Qualification for the AFC Cup group stage
3	Bhayangkara (Note: Bhayangkara would have qualified for the AFC Cup group stage had Persija qualified for the AFC Champions League group stage. As Persija failed to qualify for the AFC Champions League group stage, Bhayangkara's qualification in the AFC Cup was annulled.)	34	15	8	11	41	39	+2	53	
4	Persib	34	14	10	10	49	41	+8	52	
5	Persebaya	34	14	8	12	60	48	+12	50 (Note: Head-to-head results: Persebaya 1–0 Arema; Arema 1–0 Persebaya)	
6	Arema	34	14	8	12	53	42	+11	50	
7	Borneo	34	14	6	14	50	49	+1	48 (Note: Head-to-head results: Madura United 1–2 Borneo, Borneo 2–2 Madura United)	
8	Madura United	34	13	9	12	47	50	−3	48	
9	Barito Putera	34	12	11	11	52	55	−3	47	
10	PSIS	34	13	7	14	39	42	−3	46	
11	Bali United	34	12	9	13	44	48	−4	45	
12	Persipura	34	12	8	14	49	46	+3	44	
13	Persela	34	11	10	13	53	52	+1	43	
14	Perseru	34	11	9	14	34	41	−7	42 (Note: Head-to-head results: Perseru 0–0 PS TIRA; PS TIRA 0–1 Perseru)	
15	PS TIRA	34	12	6	16	48	57	−9	42	
16	Mitra Kukar (R)	34	12	3	19	45	58	−13	39 (Note: Head-to-head results: Mitra Kukar 3–0 Sriwijaya; Sriwijaya 3–1 Mitra Kukar)	Relegation to Liga 2
17	Sriwijaya (R)	34	11	6	17	48	56	−8	39	Relegation to Liga 2
18	PSMS (Note: PSMS were deducted three points due to FIFA sanction.) (R)	34	11	4	19	50	70	−20	34	Relegation to Liga 2

Source: Go-Jek Liga 1, Soccerway
Rules for classification: 1) Points; 2) Head-to-head; 3) Goal difference; 4) Goals scored; 5) Drawing.
(C) Champions; (R) Relegated

=== Liga 2 ===
First round

West Region

Pos	Team	Pld	Pts
1	Semen Padang (P)	22	39
2	Persiraja	22	35
3	Aceh United	22	35
4	Persita	22	35
5	Persis	22	35
6	PSPS Riau	22	31
7	Perserang	22	31
8	Cilegon United	22	29
9	Persibat	22	28
10	Persika (R)	22	24
11	PSIR (R)	22	22
12	Persik Kendal (R)	22	22

Source: Babak Penyisihan Liga 2
(P) Promoted;
(R) Relegated
East Region

Pos	Team	Pld	Pts
1	PSS (C, P)	22	43
2	Kalteng Putra (P)	22	39
3	Madura	22	39
4	PSMP	22	37
5	Martapura	22	31
6	PSIM	22	31
7	Blitar United	22	31
8	Persiba	22	27
9	PSBS	22	26
10	Persegres (R)	22	26
11	Semeru (R)	22	19
12	Persiwa (R)	22	7

Source: Babak Penyisihan Liga 2
(C) Champions;
(P) Promoted;
(R) Relegated

Second round

Group A

Pos	Team	Pld	Pts
1	Semen Padang	6	10
2	Kalteng Putra	6	10
3	PSMP	6	9
4	Aceh United	6	5

Source: Babak 8 Besar Liga 2
Group B

Pos	Team	Pld	Pts
1	PSS	6	10
2	Persita	6	10
3	Persiraja	6	9
4	Madura	6	6

Source: Babak 8 Besar Liga 2

Knockout Round

Semi-finals
25/28 November
Persita	1	1	2
Semen Padang	0	3	3
25/28 November
Kalteng Putra	0	0	0
PSS	0	2	2

Final
4 December – Cibinong
Semen Padang	0
PSS	2
Third place
4 December – Cibinong
Persita	0
Kalteng Putra	2

Final

4 December 2018
18:30 UTC+7

Semen Padang	0–2	PSS
	Report	Gonzáles 18'; Lastori 27'

Pakansari Stadium, Cibinong
Referee: Dwi Purba

=== Liga 3 ===
First round

Group A
Pos	Team	Pld	Pts
1	PSGC	3	7
2	AS Abadi	3	6
3	Persibas	3	4
4	757 Kepri Jaya	3	0

Source: PSSI

Group B
Pos	Team	Pld	Pts
1	PSCS	3	9
2	Solok	3	4
3	PSBL	3	3
4	PSID	3	1

Source: PSSI

Group C
Pos	Team	Pld	Pts
1	Persiba Bantul	3	7
2	Bogor	3	7
3	Persem	3	3
4	Kotabaru	3	0

Source: PSSI

Group D
Pos	Team	Pld	Pts
1	Lampung Sakti	3	7
2	Perssu	3	6
3	PS Badung	3	3
4	Persedikab	3	1

Source: PSSI

Group E
Pos	Team	Pld	Pts
1	Persijap	2	4
2	Persatu	2	2
3	Persema 1953	2	1

Source: PSSI

Group F
Pos	Team	Pld	Pts
1	PSBK	2	4
2	Persewar	2	4
3	OTP37	2	−3
4	Persewangi	0	0

Source: PSSI

Group G
Pos	Team	Pld	Pts
1	Persik	3	9
2	PSN	3	6
3	Persitoli	3	3
4	Persekam Metro	3	0

Source: PSSI

Group H
Pos	Team	Pld	Pts
1	Celebest	3	6
2	Persinga	3	6
3	Kreasindo XIII Merdeka	3	4
4	Persekap	3	1

Source: PSSI

Second round

The second round featured by 16 teams which are the winners and runner-ups from each group of the first round. The second round matches was played from 8–9 December 2018. Each winner advanced to third round.

8 December 2018
PSGC	2–0	Solok	Galuh Stadium, Ciamis Regency
Persiba Bantul	4–0	Perssu	Mini Stadium, Cibinong
Persijap	1–1 (9–10 p)	Persewar	Gelora Bumi Kartini Stadium, Jepara
Persik	2–1	Persinga	Brawijaya Stadium, Kediri
9 December 2018
PSCS	4–0	AS Abadi	Wijayakusuma Stadium, Cilacap Regency
Lampung Sakti	0–1	Bogor	Gelora Samudera Stadium, Kuta
PSBK	1–3	Persatu	Gelora Supriyadi Stadium, Blitar
Celebest	1–0	PSN	Brantas Stadium, Batu

Third round

West group
Pos	Team	Pld	Pts
1	PSCS (P)	3	7
2	PSGC (P)	3	6
3	Bogor (P)	3	3
4	Persiba Bantul	3	1

Source: PSSI
(P) Promoted

East group
Pos	Team	Pld	Pts
1	Persik (C, P)	3	7
2	Persatu (P)	3	4
3	Persewar (P)	3	3
4	Celebest	3	1

Source: PSSI
(C) Champions;
(P) Promoted

Final

27 December 2018

Persik	3–1	PSCS
Septian 7', 45+1'; Alfian 23'	Report	Jimmy 18'

Brawijaya Stadium, Kediri
Referee: Yudi Nurcahya

30 December 2018

PSCS	1–0	Persik
Arbeta 87'	Report

Wijayakusuma Stadium, Cilacap
Referee: Thoriq Alkatiri

== AFC Competitions ==
=== AFC Champions League ===
==== Qualifying play-offs ====
===== Preliminary round 1 =====
Team 1	Score	Team 2
Bali United (Indonesia)	3–1	(Singapore) Tampines Rovers

===== Preliminary round 2 =====
Team 1	Score	Team 2
Chiangrai United (Thailand)	2–1 (a.e.t.)	(Indonesia) Bali United

=== AFC Cup ===
==== Group stage ====
===== Group G =====
Pos	Team	Pld	W	D	L	GF	GA	GD	Pts	Qualification	YAN	GLO	THA	BAL
1	(Myanmar) Yangon United	6	4	1	1	15	9	+6	13	Zonal semi-finals	—	3–0	2–1	3–2
2	(Philippines) Global Cebu	6	2	2	2	9	10	−1	8		2–1	—	3–3	1–1
3	(Vietnam) FLC Thanh Hóa	6	1	3	2	9	11	−2	6		3–3	1–0	—	0–0
4	(Indonesia) Bali United	6	1	2	3	8	11	−3	5		1–3	1–3	3–1	—

Source: AFC

===== Group H =====
Pos	Team	Pld	W	D	L	GF	GA	GD	Pts	Qualification	PSJ	SLN	JDT	TAM
1	(Indonesia) Persija Jakarta	6	4	1	1	13	6	+7	13	Zonal semi-finals	—	1–0	4–0	4–1
2	(Vietnam) Sông Lam Nghệ An	6	3	1	2	8	5	+3	10 (Note: Head-to-head results: Sông Lam Nghệ An 2–0 Johor Darul Ta'zim, Johor Darul Ta'zim 3–2 Sông Lam Nghệ An.)		0–0	—	2–0	2–1
3	(Malaysia) Johor Darul Ta'zim	6	3	1	2	8	9	−1	10		3–0	3–2	—	2–1
4	(Singapore) Tampines Rovers	6	0	1	5	5	14	−9	1		2–4	0–2	0–0	—

Source: AFC

==== Knockout stage ====
===== Zonal semi-finals =====
Team 1	Agg.	Team 2	1st leg	2nd leg
Home United (Singapore)	6–3	(Indonesia) Persija Jakarta	3–2	3–1
