= 2018 Liga 3 (Indonesia) =

Liga 3
- Season: 2018
- Dates: Qualifying: 25 March – 15 November 2018; National round: 26 November – 30 December 2018
- Champions: Persik (1st title)
- Promoted: Persik; PSCS; Persatu; PSGC; Persewar; Bogor
- Matches: 63
- Goals: 185 (2.94 per match)
- Best player: Galih Akbar (Persik)
- Top goalscorer: Septian Bagaskara (21 goals)
- Highest scoring: Kotabaru 0–11 Persiba Bantul (2 December 2018)

The 2018 Liga 3 was the second season of the Liga 3 under its current name, the third season under its current league structure, and the only amateur league football competition in Indonesia.

The league was divided into the regional stage and the national stage. Every amateur team in Indonesia competed in its provincial stage of the league and the teams which relegated from 2017 Liga 2 competed in the national zone preliminary round.

Persik defeated PSCS 3–2 on aggregate to win their first Liga 3 title.

== Overview ==
=== Player regulations ===
Teams can register a maximum of 30 players. 27 players were under 23 years old (U-23) and 3 players without age restriction, the teams also could not use foreign players.

== Qualifying round ==
Qualifying round for national round was divided into 2 routes:

- Regional route (consist of representatives from 34 provinces). First, each province held their provincial league followed by unlimited amateur teams with different competition format (see table below). Then qualified teams from provincial league competed in their respective region to earn 24 spots in regional preliminary round based on their quota. These 24 teams then competed for 12 slots in national round.
- National zone route was consisted of the teams which relegated from 2017 Liga 2, 20 teams (winners and runner-ups from 8 groups + 4 play-off winner) qualified for national round from this route.

=== Regional route ===
==== Province round ====
These teams were representatives from their provincial league to be competed in regional round.

#	Province	Qualified teams	Competition format
**Sumatra Region**
1	Aceh	—N/a	Not held
2	North Sumatra (28 teams)	**PSDS Deli Serdang**; Medan Utama; PS Bhinneka	Started on 9 July 2018; Preliminary: Divided to 8 groups, home tournament Second Round: Divided to 4 groups, home tournament Top 8 - Final Round: Knockout system with single match
3	West Sumatra (19 teams)	**Solok**; Batang Anai	Started on 2 July 2018; First Round: divided to 4 groups, home tournament Second Round: Divided to 2 groups, home tournament Final Round (Top 4): Single round robin home tournament
4	Riau (9 teams)	**AS Abadi**; PS Petalangan	Started on 12 August 2018; First Round: Single round robin home tournament Final Round (Top 6): Single round robin home tournament
5	Riau Islands (6 teams)	**PS Putra Kundur**	Started on 2 August 2018; Preliminary: Divided to 2 groups, home tournament Semifinal - Final Round: Knock-out system with single match
6	Jambi (7 teams)	**Batanghari**	Started on 1 July 2018; Double round robin home-away tournament
7	South Sumatra	—N/a	Not held
8	Bangka Belitung Islands (6 teams)	**PS Basel**	Started on 16 July 2018; Preliminary: Divided to 2 groups, home tournament Final Round: single match
9	Bengkulu (11 teams)	**PS Benteng**	Started on 29 April 2018; Double round robin home-away tournament
10	Lampung (9 teams)	**Putrad**; SS Lampung	Started on 25 July 2018; Preliminary: Divided to 2 groups, home tournament Semifinal - Final Round: Knock-out system with single match
**Java Region**
11	Banten (9 teams)	**Persikota Tangerang**; Persitangsel South Tangerang	Started on 7 August 2018; Preliminary: Divided to 2 groups, home tournament Final Round (Top 4): Single round robin home tournament
12	Jakarta (21 teams)	**East Jakarta**; PRO-Direct; PSJS South Jakarta	Started on 22 July 2018; Preliminary: Divided to 4 groups, home tournament Semifinal - Final Round: Knock-out system with single match
13	West Java (41 teams)	**PSKC Cimahi**; Persikab Bandung; Super Progresif; Persitas Tasikmalaya; Bintang Timur; Perssi Sukabumi; Maung Anom; Persikasi Bekasi	Started on 29 April 2018; Preliminary: Divided to 6 groups, double round-robin home tournament Top 16 - Final Round: Knock-out system with single match
14	Central Java (17 teams)	**PSIP Pemalang**; Persibara Banjarnegara; Persab Brebes; BR Unika; PSD Demak	Started on 25 March 2018; Preliminary: Divided to 4 groups, home-away tournament Top 8 - Semifinal round: Knock-out system, home-away Final Round: Single match
15	(Special Region of Yogyakarta) Yogyakarta	—N/a	Not held
16	East Java (49 teams)	**Persiga Trenggalek**; Persekabpas Pasuruan; PS KoPa; Deltras; Blitar Poetra; Persem Mojokerto; Persedikab Kediri; PSID Jombang; Putra Sinar Giri; Lamongan; Persema 1953 Malang	Started on 1 April 2018; First Round: Divided to 7 groups, home-away tournament Second Round: 4 groups, home tournament Semifinal - Final Round: Knock-out system with single match
**Kalimantan Region**
17	West Kalimantan	—N/a	Not held
18	Central Kalimantan (6 teams)	**Persesam Sampit**	Started on 5 August 2018 (West), and 12 August 2018 (Central); Preliminary: Divided to 2 zones (each 3 teams), home tournament Final Round: Two-legged matches in neutral venue
19	South Kalimantan (16 teams)	**Kotabaru**; Persetala Tanah Laut	Started on 24 June 2018; Preliminary: divided to 4 groups, home-away tournament Second Round: divided to 2 groups, home tournament Semifinal - Final Round: Knock-out system with single match
20	East Kalimantan (19 teams)	**PS PU**; Bontang City	Started on 22 April 2018; Preliminary: divided to 3 groups, home tournament Top 8: single round robin home tournament Semifinal - Final Round: Knock-out system with single match
21	North Kalimantan	—N/a	Not held
**Sulawesi Region**
22	North Sulawesi (15 teams)	**Persmin Minahasa**; Persma 1960 Manado	Started on 22 July 2018; Preliminary: divided to 4 groups, home tournament Second Round: Divided to 2 groups, home tournament Semifinal round: Knock-out system with single match Final Round: Home-away matches
23	Central Sulawesi (16 teams)	**Persido Donggala**	Started on 3 May 2018 (Morowali), and 30 July 2018 (Palu); Preliminary: Divided to 2 zones, each zone consist of 2 groups, home tournament Final Round (Top 6): Single round robin home tournament
24	South Sulawesi (20 teams)	**Palopo United**; Persibone Bone	Started on 14 July 2018; Preliminary: divided to 5 groups, home tournament Second Round: divided to 2 groups, home tournament Semifinal round: Knock-out system, home-away Final Round: Single match
25	Southeast Sulawesi (16 teams)	**PS Wonua Bombana**	Started on 22 April 2018; Preliminary: Divided to 4 groups, home tournament Top 8 - Final Round: Knock-out system with single match
26	Gorontalo (7 teams)	**Kreasindo XIII Merdeka**	Started on 27 August 2018; Preliminary: Divided to 2 groups, home tournament Semifinal - Final Round: Knock-out system with single match
27	West Sulawesi (12 teams)	**OTP37**	Started on 9 May 2018 (Mamuju) and ? (Polewali); Preliminary:divided to 2 zones, home tournament Semifinal - Final Round: Knock-out system with single match
**Lesser Sunda Islands Region**
28	Bali (10 teams)	**Putra Tresna**	Started on 2 July 2018; Preliminary: Divided to 2 groups, home tournament Semifinal - Final Round: Knock-out system with single match
29	West Nusa Tenggara (13 teams)	**Perslotim East Lombok**	Started on 29 July 2018 (Sumbawa), and 1 August 2018 (Lombok); Preliminary: Divided to 2 zones, home tournament Sumbawa (5 teams, 1 group), Lombok (8 teams, 2 groups); Final Round: Home-away matches
30	East Nusa Tenggara (10 teams)	**PSN Ngada**; PSK Kupang	Started on 10 July 2018; Preliminary: Divided to 2 groups, home tournament Semifinal - Final Round: Knock-out system with single match
**Maluku Region**
31	(Maluku (province)) Maluku (8 teams)	**Ambon United**	Started on 29 April 2018; Single round robin home tournament
32	North Maluku (2 teams)	**Persiter Ternate**	Started on 22 July 2018; Home-away matches
**Papua Region**
33	(West Papua (province)) West Papua (9 teams)	**Persikos Sorong**; Persiss Sorong; Persisos South Sorong	Started on 9 July 2018; Single round robin home tournament
34	(Papua (province)) Papua (20 teams)	**Persemi Mimika**; Persewar Waropen; Persitoli Tolikara; Nafri; Persemar Mamberamo Raya	Started on 30 June 2018; Preliminary: Divided to 3 groups, home tournament Final Round (Top 6): Single round robin home tournament

Note:
- BOLD: Winner of each provincial league.

==== Regional round ====
The following teams qualified from regional route for the national round.

Qualified teams	Province	Qualified on
OTP37	West Sulawesi	6 November 2018
Solok	West Sumatra	13 November 2018
PSID	East Java	13 November 2018
Kotabaru	South Kalimantan	13 November 2018
Persewar	Papua	13 November 2018
Persitoli	Papua	14 November 2018
Persema 1953	East Java	14 November 2018
AS Abadi	Riau	14 November 2018
PSN	East Nusa Tenggara	15 November 2018
Kreasindo XIII Merdeka	Gorontalo	15 November 2018
Persedikab	East Java	15 November 2018
Persem	East Java	15 November 2018

=== National zone route ===
The following 32 teams entered the national zone route:

- 757 Kepri Jaya
- Celebest
- Lampung Sakti
- Madiun Putra
- Persatu Tuban
- Persbul Buol
- Perseka Kaimana (rename it again after last year competing with the name Perseka Manokwari)
- Persekam Metro

- Persekap Pasuruan
- Persepam Madura Utama
- Persewangi Banyuwangi
- Persiba Bantul
- Persibangga Purbalingga
- Persibas Banyumas
- Persida Sidoarjo
- Persih Masurai (formerly Persih Tembilahan)

- Persijap Jepara
- Persik Kediri
- Persikabo Bogor
- Bogor (formerly Persikad Depok)
- Persinga Ngawi
- Persip Pekalongan
- Persipon Pontianak
- Persipur Purwodadi

- Perssu Real Madura
- PS Badung
- PS West Sumbawa
- PSBI Blitar
- PSBK Blitar
- PSBL Langsa
- PSCS Cilacap
- PSGC Ciamis

There should be 40 teams relegated from 2017 Liga 2 competed in this route, but Pro Duta and Persifa Fak-fak disqualified. On 5 June 2018, PSSI disqualified PPSM Magelang and Sragen United. Also PS Bengkulu, PS Timah BaBel, and Persigubin Gunung Bintang withdrew from the competition. Later on 28 July 2018, PSSI disqualified Yahukimo because they didn't attend match coordination meeting in Gawalise Stadium. The following teams qualified from national zone route for the national round.

Qualified teams	Qualified as	Qualified on
757 Kepri Jaya	Group 1 winner	25 August 2018
PSCS	Group 3 winner	25 August 2018
PS Badung	Group 7 winner	30 August 2018
PSBL	Group 1 runner-up	1 September 2018
Persiba Bantul	Group 4 runner-up	2 September 2018
Persewangi	Group 7 runner-up	2 September 2018
Persekap	Group 6 runner-up	5 September 2018
Persibas	Group 3 runner-up	8 September 2018
Persik	Group 5 runner-up	8 September 2018
Persijap	Group 4 winner	9 September 2018
Bogor	Group 2 winner	9 September 2018
Lampung Sakti	Group 2 runner-up	9 September 2018
PSBK	Group 5 winner	15 September 2018
Persekam Metro	Group 6 winner	16 September 2018
Persatu	Play-off winner	7 October 2018
PSGC	Play-off winner	7 October 2018
Persinga	Play-off winner	7 October 2018
Celebest	Group 8 winner	20 October 2018
Perseka	Group 8 runner-up	25 October 2018
Perssu	Play-off winner	25 October 2018

== National round ==
A total of 32 teams (20 teams from national zone route and 12 teams from The regional route) compete in this round.

=== First round ===
In this first round, 32 teams divided into eight groups. Each group played a home tournament basis. First round was played from 26 November – 2 December 2018. Winner and runner-up of each group advanced to second round.

==== Group A ====
PSGC hosted this group at Galuh Stadium, Ciamis Regency and Wiradadaha Stadium, Tasikmalaya.

Pos	Team	Pld	W	D	L	GF	GA	GD	Pts	Qualification
1	PSGC	3	2	1	0	9	5	+4	7	Advance to second round
2	AS Abadi	3	2	0	1	5	5	0	6	Advance to second round
3	Persibas	3	1	1	1	7	8	−1	4	
4	757 Kepri Jaya	3	0	0	3	3	6	−3	0	

Source: PSSI

26 November 2018
PSGC	2–1	757 Kepri Jaya	Galuh Stadium, Ciamis Regency
AS Abadi	3–1	Persibas	Galuh Stadium, Ciamis Regency
29 November 2018
Persibas	3–3	PSGC	Galuh Stadium, Ciamis Regency
757 Kepri Jaya	0–1	AS Abadi	Galuh Stadium, Ciamis Regency
2 December 2018
PSGC	4–1	AS Abadi	Galuh Stadium, Ciamis Regency
Persibas	3–2	757 Kepri Jaya	Wiradadaha Stadium, Tasikmalaya

==== Group B ====
PSCS hosted this group at Wijayakusuma Stadium, Cilacap Regency and Goentoer Darjono Stadium, Purbalingga Regency.

Pos	Team	Pld	W	D	L	GF	GA	GD	Pts	Qualification
1	PSCS	3	3	0	0	5	2	+3	9	Advance to second round
2	Solok	3	1	1	1	3	2	+1	4	Advance to second round
3	PSBL	3	1	0	2	5	7	−2	3	
4	PSID	3	0	1	2	3	5	−2	1	

Source: PSSI

25 November 2018
PSCS	1–0	PSID	Wijayakusuma Stadium, Cilacap Regency
PSBL	0–2	Solok	Wijayakusuma Stadium, Cilacap Regency
28 November 2018
PSID	2–3	PSBL	Wijayakusuma Stadium, Cilacap Regency
Solok	0–1	PSCS	Wijayakusuma Stadium, Cilacap Regency
1 December 2018
PSCS	3–2	PSBL	Wijayakusuma Stadium, Cilacap Regency
Solok	1–1	PSID	Goentoer Darjono Stadium, Purbalingga Regency

==== Group C ====
Bogor hosted this group at Mini Stadium and Pakansari Stadium, Cibinong. But due to 212 reunion activity and the arrival of the president to Pakansari Stadium (Indonesian Teachers' Union Anniversary), the last matches in this group was moved to Heri Sudrajat Stadium, Depok and PPMP Stadium, Sentul without spectators.

Pos	Team	Pld	W	D	L	GF	GA	GD	Pts	Qualification
1	Persiba Bantul	3	2	1	0	14	2	+12	7	Advance to second round
2	Bogor	3	2	1	0	12	4	+8	7	Advance to second round
3	Persem	3	1	0	2	6	5	+1	3	
4	Kotabaru	3	0	0	3	1	22	−21	0	

Source: PSSI

26 November 2018
Bogor	1–1	Persiba Bantul	Mini Stadium, Cibinong
Persem	3–0	Kotabaru	Mini Stadium, Cibinong
29 November 2018
Kotabaru	1–8	Bogor	Mini Stadium, Cibinong
Persiba Bantul	2–1	Persem	Mini Stadium, Cibinong
2 December 2018
Bogor	3–2	Persem	PPMP Stadium, Sentul
Kotabaru	0–11	Persiba Bantul	Heri Sudrajat Stadium, Depok

==== Group D ====
PS Badung hosted this group at Gelora Samudera Stadium, Kuta and Beji Mandala Stadium, Pecatu.

Pos	Team	Pld	W	D	L	GF	GA	GD	Pts	Qualification
1	Lampung Sakti	3	2	1	0	4	2	+2	7	Advance to second round
2	Perssu	3	2	0	1	5	4	+1	6	Advance to second round
3	PS Badung	3	1	0	2	3	4	−1	3	
4	Persedikab	3	0	1	2	3	5	−2	1	

Source: PSSI

26 November 2018
PS Badung	1–0	Persedikab	Gelora Samudera Stadium, Kuta
Lampung Sakti	1–0	Perssu	Beji Mandala Stadium, Pecatu
29 November 2018
Perssu	2–1	PS Badung	Gelora Samudera Stadium, Kuta
Persedikab	1–1	Lampung Sakti	Beji Mandala Stadium, Pecatu
2 December 2018
PS Badung	1–2	Lampung Sakti	Gelora Samudera Stadium, Kuta
Perssu	3–2	Persedikab	Beji Mandala Stadium, Pecatu

==== Group E ====
Persijap hosted this group at Gelora Bumi Kartini Stadium. Perseka withdrew from the competition due to technical constraints.

Pos	Team	Pld	W	D	L	GF	GA	GD	Pts	Qualification
1	Persijap	2	1	1	0	3	1	+2	4	Advance to second round
2	Persatu	2	0	2	0	0	0	0	2	Advance to second round
3	Persema 1953	2	0	1	1	1	3	−2	1	

Source: PSSI

26 November 2018
Persijap	3–1	Persema 1953	Gelora Bumi Kartini Stadium, Jepara
29 November 2018
Persema 1953	0–0	Persatu	Gelora Bumi Kartini Stadium, Jepara
2 December 2018
Persatu	0–0	Persijap	Gelora Bumi Kartini Stadium, Jepara

==== Group F ====
PSBK hosted this group at Gelora Supriyadi Stadium, Blitar.

Pos	Team	Pld	W	D	L	GF	GA	GD	Pts	Qualification
1	PSBK	2	1	1	0	4	1	+3	4	Advance to second round
2	Persewar	2	1	1	0	3	1	+2	4	Advance to second round
3	OTP37 (Note: OTP37 were deducted three points for walkout in the match against PSBK)	2	0	0	2	0	5	−5	−3	
4	Persewangi (Note: Persewangi were disqualified for not attended the matches against PSBK and Persewar)	0	0	0	0	0	0	0	0	Disqualified

Source: PSSI
Notes:

26 November 2018
Persewar	2–0	OTP37	Gelora Supriyadi Stadium, Blitar
29 November 2018
OTP37	0–3 (w/o)	PSBK	Gelora Supriyadi Stadium, Blitar
2 December 2018
PSBK	1–1	Persewar	Gelora Supriyadi Stadium, Blitar

==== Group G ====
Persik hosted this group at Brawijaya Stadium, Kediri and Canda Bhirawa Stadium, Kediri Regency.

Pos	Team	Pld	W	D	L	GF	GA	GD	Pts	Qualification
1	Persik	3	3	0	0	11	0	+11	9	Advance to second round
2	PSN	3	2	0	1	5	3	+2	6	Advance to second round
3	Persitoli	3	1	0	2	2	6	−4	3	
4	Persekam Metro	3	0	0	3	1	10	−9	0	

Source: PSSI

26 November 2018
Persik	2–0	Persitoli	Brawijaya Stadium, Kediri
PSN	2–0	Persekam Metro	Brawijaya Stadium, Kediri
29 November 2018
Persekam Metro	0–6	Persik	Brawijaya Stadium, Kediri
Persitoli	0–3	PSN	Brawijaya Stadium, Kediri
2 December 2018
Persik	3–0	PSN	Brawijaya Stadium, Kediri
Persekam Metro	1–2	Persitoli	Canda Bhirawa Stadium, Kediri Regency

==== Group H ====
Persinga hosted this group at Brantas Stadium and Kusuma Agrowisata Stadium, Batu.

Pos	Team	Pld	W	D	L	GF	GA	GD	Pts	Qualification
1	Celebest	3	2	0	1	3	3	0	6 (Note: Persinga 0–1 Celebest)	Advance to second round
2	Persinga	3	2	0	1	4	3	+1	6	Advance to second round
3	Kreasindo XIII Merdeka	3	1	1	1	3	2	+1	4	
4	Persekap	3	0	1	2	2	4	−2	1	

Source: PSSI
Notes:

27 November 2018
Persinga	0–1	Celebest	Brantas Stadium, Batu
Kreasindo XIII Merdeka	0–0	Persekap	Brantas Stadium, Batu
29 November 2018
Celebest	0–2	Kreasindo XIII Merdeka	Kusuma Agrowisata Stadium, Batu
Persekap	1–2	Persinga	Brantas Stadium, Batu
2 December 2018
Persinga	2–1	Kreasindo XIII Merdeka	Brantas Stadium, Batu
Persekap	1–2	Celebest	Kusuma Agrowisata Stadium, Batu

=== Second round ===
The second round featured by 16 teams which are the winners and runner-ups from each group of the first round. The second round matches was played from 8–9 December 2018. Each winner advanced to third round.

8 December 2018
PSGC	2–0	Solok	Galuh Stadium, Ciamis Regency
Persiba Bantul	4–0	Perssu	Mini Stadium, Cibinong
Persijap	1–1 (9–10 p)	Persewar	Gelora Bumi Kartini Stadium, Jepara
Persik	2–1	Persinga	Brawijaya Stadium, Kediri
9 December 2018
PSCS	4–0	AS Abadi	Wijayakusuma Stadium, Cilacap Regency
Lampung Sakti	0–1	Bogor	Gelora Samudera Stadium, Kuta
PSBK	1–3	Persatu	Gelora Supriyadi Stadium, Blitar
Celebest	1–0	PSN	Brantas Stadium, Batu

=== Third round ===
In this round, eight teams divided into two groups. Each group played a home tournament basis. Third round was played from 16–22 December 2018. Three best teams of each group promoted to Liga 2. Winner of each group also advanced to final.

==== West Group ====
PSGC hosted this group at Galuh Stadium, Ciamis Regency.

Pos	Team	Pld	W	D	L	GF	GA	GD	Pts	Qualification
1	PSCS (P)	3	2	1	0	4	2	+2	7	Promoted to Liga 2 and advance to final
2	PSGC (P)	3	2	0	1	5	3	+2	6	Promoted to Liga 2
3	Bogor (P)	3	1	0	2	2	4	−2	3	Promoted to Liga 2
4	Persiba Bantul	3	0	1	2	1	3	−2	1	

Source: PSSI
(P) Promoted

16 December 2018
PSGC	3–1	Bogor	Galuh Stadium, Ciamis Regency
PSCS	1–1	Persiba Bantul	Galuh Stadium, Ciamis Regency
19 December 2018
Persiba Bantul	0–1	PSGC	Galuh Stadium, Ciamis Regency
Bogor	0–1	PSCS	Galuh Stadium, Ciamis Regency
22 December 2018
PSGC	1–2	PSCS	Galuh Stadium, Ciamis Regency
Persiba Bantul	0–1	Bogor	Galuh Stadium, Ciamis Regency

==== East Group ====
Persik hosted this group at Brawijaya Stadium, Kediri and Canda Bhirawa Stadium, Kediri Regency.

Pos	Team	Pld	W	D	L	GF	GA	GD	Pts	Qualification
1	Persik (C, P)	3	2	1	0	7	4	+3	7	{Promoted to Liga 2 and advance to final
2	Persatu (P)	3	1	1	1	4	5	−1	4	Promoted to Liga 2
3	Persewar (P)	3	0	3	0	4	4	0	3	Promoted to Liga 2
4	Celebest	3	0	1	2	5	7	−2	1	

Source: PSSI
(C) Champions; (P) Promoted

16 December 2018
Persik	1–1	Persewar	Brawijaya Stadium, Kediri
Persatu	2–1	Celebest	Brawijaya Stadium, Kediri
19 December 2018
Celebest	2–3	Persik	Brawijaya Stadium, Kediri
Persewar	1–1	Persatu	Brawijaya Stadium, Kediri
22 December 2018
Persik	3–1	Persatu	Brawijaya Stadium, Kediri
Celebest	2–2	Persewar	Canda Bhirawa Stadium, Kediri Regency

=== Finals ===
27 December 2018

Persik	3–1	PSCS
Septian 7', 45+1'; Alfian 23'	Report	Jimmy 18'

Brawijaya Stadium, Kediri
Referee: Yudi Nurcahya

30 December 2018

PSCS	1–0	Persik
Arbeta 87'	Report

Wijayakusuma Stadium, Cilacap
Referee: Thoriq Alkatiri

Persik won 3–2 on aggregate

== Champions ==
Champions
Persik Kediri
1st title

== See also ==
- 2018 Liga 1
- 2018 Liga 2
- 2018–19 Piala Indonesia
