= 2018 Liga 3 North Maluku =

Liga 3 North Maluku
- Season: 2018
- Champions: Persiter Ternate

The 2018 Liga 3 North Maluku is the fourth edition of Liga 3 North Maluku as a qualifying round for the national round of 2018 Liga 3. Persiter Ternate are the defending champions.

== Teams ==
Only 2 clubs which will participate the league in this season

22 July 2018

Persiter Ternate	1–0	Persitob Tobelo
	Report

Gelora Kie Raha Stadium, Ternate
24 July 2018

Persitob Tobelo	2–1	Persiter Ternate
	Report

Gelora Kie Raha Stadium, Ternate
