= 2018 Liga 3 Special Region of Yogyakarta =

Liga 3 Jogjakarta
- Season: 2018

The 2018 Liga 3 Jogjakarta is a qualifying round for the national round of 2018 Liga 3. Satria Adhikarta, the winner of the 2017 Liga 3 Jogjakarta are the defending champions but the team did not participate in this year's competition. The competition will begin on June 27, 2018.

== Group stage ==
The 9 probable teams to compete are mentioned below. This stage scheduled starts on 27 Jule 2018.

=== Group A ===
Pos	Team	Pld	W	D	L	GF	GA	GD	Pts	Qualification
1	Sleman United	0	0	0	0	0	0	0	0	Advance to next round
2	Rajawali F.C.	0	0	0	0	0	0	0	0	Advance to next round
3	PS HW	0	0	0	0	0	0	0	0	
4	Persikup Kulonprogo	0	0	0	0	0	0	0	0	
5	Gama F.C.	0	0	0	0	0	0	0	0	

Updated to match(es) played on 23 July 2018. Source:

=== Group B ===
Pos	Team	Pld	W	D	L	GF	GA	GD	Pts	Qualification
1	UAD F.C.	0	0	0	0	0	0	0	0	Advance to next round
2	Protaba	0	0	0	0	0	0	0	0	Advance to next round
3	UNY F.C.	0	0	0	0	0	0	0	0	
4	Tunas Jogja	0	0	0	0	0	0	0	0	

Updated to match(es) played on 23 July 2018. Source:
