= 2018 Liga 3 Bali =

Tournament details
- Dates: 2–18 July 2018
- Teams: 10

Final positions
- Champions: Putra Tresna (1st title)
- Runners-up: Perseden
- Third place: Undiksha
- Fourth place: Perst
- Regional Round: Putra Tresna

Tournament statistics
- Matches played: 24
- Goals scored: 96 (4 per match)

The 2018 Liga 3 Bali was the third edition of Liga 3 Bali as a qualifying round for the Lesser Sunda Islands (Bali Nusra) regional round of 2018 Liga 3. Persekaba Bali were the defending champions. The competition started on 2 July 2018 and finished on 18 July 2018.

Putra Tresna won their first Liga 3 Bali title following a 2–0 victory over Perseden Denpasar after extra time on 18 July 2018. Putra Tresna would represent Bali Region for the Lesser Sunda Islands regional round.

== Format ==
In this competition, the teams were divided into two groups of five. The two best teams were through to knockout stage. The winner represented Bali Region in Lesser Sunda Islands regional round of 2018 Liga 3.

== Teams ==
There were 10 teams participated in the league this season.

Team	City/Regency
Bali	Bantul, Yogyakarta
Bintang Persi Putra	Badung
Persekaba Bali	Badung
Perseden	Denpasar
Perst	Tabanan
Pro Kundalini	Denpasar
Putra Pegok	Denpasar
Putra Tresna	Denpasar
Tunas Muda	Gianyar
Undiksha	Buleleng

== Group stage ==
This stage started on 2 July 2018 and finished on 11 July 2018.

=== Group A ===
- All matches held in Ngurah Rai Stadium, Denpasar
- Times listed are local (UTC+8:00)

Pos	Team	Pld	W	D	L	GF	GA	GD	Pts	Qualification
1	Putra Tresna	4	3	1	0	11	2	+9	10	Advance to semifinals
2	Undiksha	4	3	0	1	6	3	+3	9	Advance to semifinals
3	Persekaba Bali	4	2	1	1	8	2	+6	7	
4	Bintang Persi Putra	4	1	0	3	4	15	−11	3	
5	Bali	4	0	0	4	2	9	−7	0	

Source: Matches

2 July 2018
Putra Tresna	3–0	Bali	Ngurah Rai Stadium, Denpasar
Undiksha	1–0	Persekaba Bali	Ngurah Rai Stadium, Denpasar
4 July 2018
Bali	0–1	Undiksha	Ngurah Rai Stadium, Denpasar
Bintang Persi Putra	1–4	Putra Tresna	Ngurah Rai Stadium, Denpasar
6 July 2018
Persekaba Bali	5–0	Bintang Persi Putra	Ngurah Rai Stadium, Denpasar
Putra Tresna	3–0	Undiksha	Ngurah Rai Stadium, Denpasar
9 July 2018
Putra Tresna	1–1	Persekaba Bali	Ngurah Rai Stadium, Denpasar
Bali	2–3	Bintang Persi Putra	Ngurah Rai Stadium, Denpasar
11 July 2018
Bintang Persi Putra	0–4	Undiksha	Ngurah Rai Stadium, Denpasar
Persekaba Bali	2–0	Bali	Ngurah Rai Stadium, Denpasar

=== Group B ===
- All matches held in Kompyang Sujana Stadium, Denpasar
- Times listed are local (UTC+8:00)

Pos	Team	Pld	W	D	L	GF	GA	GD	Pts	Qualification
1	Perseden	4	4	0	0	20	3	+17	12	Advance to semifinals
2	Perst	4	2	1	1	6	10	−4	7	Advance to semifinals
3	Tunas Muda	4	2	0	2	12	3	+9	6	
4	Pro Kundalini	4	1	1	2	5	6	−1	4	
5	Putra Pegok	4	0	0	4	2	23	−21	0	

Source: Matches

2 July 2018
Tunas Muda	1–0	Pro Kundalini	Kompyang Sujana Stadium, Denpasar
Perseden	8–1	Putra Pegok	Kompyang Sujana Stadium, Denpasar
4 July 2018
Pro Kundalini	1–3	Perseden	Kompyang Sujana Stadium, Denpasar
Perst	1–0	Tunas Muda	Kompyang Sujana Stadium, Denpasar
6 July 2018
Putra Pegok	1–3	Perst	Kompyang Sujana Stadium, Denpasar
Tunas Muda	1–2	Perseden	Kompyang Sujana Stadium, Denpasar
9 July 2018
Tunas Muda	10–0	Putra Pegok	Kompyang Sujana Stadium, Denpasar
Pro Kundalini	2–2	Perst	Kompyang Sujana Stadium, Denpasar
11 July 2018
Perst	0–7	Perseden	Kompyang Sujana Stadium, Denpasar
Putra Pegok	0–2	Pro Kundalini	Kompyang Sujana Stadium, Denpasar

== Knockout stage ==
Semifinals
13 July – Denpasar
Putra Tresna	6
Perst	2
13 July – Denpasar
Perseden	3
Undiksha	2

Final
18 July – Gianyar
Putra Tresna	2
Perseden	0
Third Place
15 July – Denpasar
Perst	2
Undiksha	3

=== Semifinals ===
13 July 2018
Putra Tresna	6–2	Perst	Ngurah Rai Stadium, Denpasar
Perseden	3–2 (a.e.t.)	Undiksha	Kompyang Sujana Stadium, Denpasar

=== Third place ===
15 July 2018
Perst	2–3	Undiksha	Kompyang Sujana Stadium, Denpasar

=== Final ===
18 July 2018
Putra Tresna	2–0 (a.e.t.)	Perseden	Kapten I Wayan Dipta Stadium, Gianyar
