= 2018 Liga 3 Jambi =

Liga 3 Jambi
- Season: 2018
- Champions: Batanghari

The 2018 Liga 3 Jambi is a qualifying round for the national round of 2018 Liga 3. Persijam Jambi, the winner of the 2017 Liga 3 Jambi is the defending champions. The competition will begin on July 1, 2018.

== Format ==
In this competition, all teams will face each other in home and away matches. The winner will represent Jambi in next round.

== Teams ==
There are 7 teams which will participate the league this season.

Pos	Team	Pld	W	D	L	GF	GA	GD	Pts	Qualification
1	Batanghari F.C.	12	11	0	1	33	4	+29	33	To 2018 Liga 3 Regional Round
2	Persibri Batanghari	12	8	3	1	34	8	+26	27	
3	Persitaj West Tanjung Jabung	12	6	3	3	23	11	+12	21	
4	Persijam Jambi	12	5	3	4	25	15	+10	18	
5	Persikasa Sarolangun	12	5	1	6	16	21	−5	16	
6	Persisko Jambi City (Note: Persisko not attended the match against Merangin FC. Both of them didn't have point and declared as 0-3 lost)	12	1	0	11	3	45	−42	3	
7	Merangin F.C. (Note: Merangin FC not attended the match against Persisko. Both of them didn't have point and declared as 0-3 lost)	12	0	0	12	0	36	−36	0	

Updated to match(es) played on 19 August 2018. Source:
