= Papua Komboy =

Indonesian footballer

Personal information
- Full name: Papua Gosner Paskhalino Komboy
- Date of birth: May 11, 1999 (age 27)
- Place of birth: Jayapura, Indonesia
- Height: 1.64 m (5 ft 5 in)
- Position: Winger

Team information
- Current team: PSCS Cilacap
- Number: 57

Youth career
- 2016–2017: Persipura Jayapura

Senior career*
Years	Team	Apps	(Gls)
2018–2019	Persipura Jayapura	3	(0)
2021	Muba Babel United	0	(0)
2021	Batavia	6	(1)
2022–2024	Persiba Balikpapan	18	(2)
2024	PSPS Pekanbaru	0	(0)
2024–	PSCS Cilacap	11	(2)
- * Club domestic league appearances and goals as of 1 February 2025

Papua Gosner Paskhalino Komboy (born May 11, 1999) is an Indonesian professional footballer who plays as a winger for Liga Nusantara club PSCS Cilacap.

== Club career ==
=== Persipura Jayapura ===
He was signed for Persipura Jayapura to play in Liga 1 in the 2018 season.

== Career statistics ==
=== Club ===
As of match played 1 February 2025

Club	Season	League			Cup (Note: Includes Piala Indonesia.)		Continental		Total	
Club	Season	Division	Apps	Goals	Apps	Goals	Apps	Goals	Apps	Goals
Persipura Jayapura	2018	Liga 1	2	0	0	0	0	0	2	0
Persipura Jayapura	2019	Liga 1	1	0	0	0	0	0	1	0
Muba Babel United	2021	Liga 2	0	0	0	0	0	0	0	0
Batavia	2021	Liga 3	6	1	0	0	0	0	6	1
Persiba Balikpapan	2022	Liga 2	3	0	0	0	0	0	3	0
Persiba Balikpapan	2023–24	Liga 2	15	2	0	0	0	0	15	2
PSPS Riau	2024–25	Liga 2	0	0	0	0	0	0	0	0
PSCS Cilacap	2024–25	Liga Nusantara	11	2	0	0	0	0	11	2
Career total			38	5	0	0	0	0	38	5
