= 2018 Liga 3 Banten =

Liga 3 Banten
- Season: 2018
- Champions: Persikota

The 2018 Liga 3 Banten is a qualifying round for the national round of 2018 Liga 3. Persitangsel South Tangerang, the winner of the 2017 Liga 3 Banten are the defending champions. The competition will begin on June 27, 2018.

The 9 probable teams to compete are mentioned below. This stage scheduled starts on 27 Jule 2018.

== First round ==
=== Group A ===
Pos	Team	Pld	W	D	L	GF	GA	GD	Pts	Qualification
1	Persitangsel South Tangerang (A)	4	3	1	0	17	2	+15	10	Advance to next round
2	Banten Jaya F.C. (A)	4	2	2	0	12	3	+9	8	Advance to next round
3	Duta F.C.	4	2	1	1	15	7	+8	7	
4	Bantara S.C.	3	0	0	3	1	11	−10	0	
5	Sam’s Soccer	3	0	0	3	0	22	−22	0	

Updated to match(es) played on 23 July 2018. Source:
(A) Advance to a further round

=== Group B ===
Pos	Team	Pld	W	D	L	GF	GA	GD	Pts	Qualification
1	Persikota Tangerang (A)	3	3	0	0	10	0	+10	9	Advance to next round
2	Serang Jaya F.C. (A)	3	2	0	1	4	1	+3	6	Advance to next round
3	Perssic Cilegon	3	0	1	2	4	8	−4	1	
4	Persipan Pandeglang	3	0	1	2	4	13	−9	1	

Updated to match(es) played on 23 July 2018. Source:
(A) Advance to a further round

== Second round ==
=== Group C ===
Pos	Team	Pld	W	D	L	GF	GA	GD	Pts	Qualification
1	Persikota Tangerang (A)	3	2	1	0	6	0	+6	7	Advance to 2018 Liga 3 Regional Round
2	Persitangsel South Tangerang (A)	3	2	1	0	6	2	+4	7	Advance to 2018 Liga 3 Regional Round
3	Banten Jaya F.C.	3	0	1	2	2	7	−5	1	
4	Serang Jaya F.C.	3	0	1	2	2	7	−5	1	

Updated to match(es) played on 27 August 2018. Source:
(A) Advance to a further round
