= 2018 Liga 3 Bengkulu =

Liga 3 Bengkulu
- Season: 2018
- Champions: PS Benteng

The 2018 Liga 3 Bengkulu is a qualifying round for the national round of 2018 Liga 3. PS Benteng Central Bengkulu, the winner of the 2017 Liga 3 Bengkulu are the defending champions. The competition will begin on June 30, 2018.

== Format ==
In this competition, all teams will face each other in home and away match. The winner will represent Bengkulu in national round of 2018 Liga 3.

== Teams ==
There are initially 11 clubs which will participate the league in this season.

== Table ==
This stage scheduled starts on 29 April 2018.

Pos	Team	Pld	W	D	L	GF	GA	GD	Pts	Qualification
1	PS Benteng Central Bengkulu	9	7	1	1	25	9	+16	22	Champions
2	PS Mukomuko	9	6	2	1	22	7	+15	20	
3	Persirel Rejang Lebong	9	5	2	2	16	10	+6	17	
4	Renal F.C.	10	4	1	5	11	17	−6	13	
5	Aprilia Hafiz	9	2	6	1	16	14	+2	12	
6	Tunas Muda	9	3	1	5	15	15	0	10	
7	Indonesia Muda	8	2	3	3	11	9	+2	9	
8	Bengkulu Raya F.C.	9	2	2	5	10	22	−12	8	
9	Bengkulu Putra F.C.	10	1	0	9	3	26	−23	3	
10	Persiman Manna	0	0	0	0	0	0	0	0	Disqualified
11	PS Kaur	0	0	0	0	0	0	0	0	Disqualified

Updated to match(es) played on 2 September 2018. Source:
