= 2018 Liga 3 Riau =

Liga 3 Riau
- Season: 2018
- Champions: AS Abadi

The 2018 Liga 3 Riau is a qualifying round for the national round of 2018 Liga 3. Nabil F.C., the winner of the 2017 Liga 3 Riau are the defending champions. The competition will begin on August 12, 2018.

== Format ==
In this competition, all teams will face each other in home and away match. The winner will represent Riau in next round.

== Teams ==
There are 8 teams which will participate the league this season.

Pos	Team	Pld	W	D	L	GF	GA	GD	Pts	Qualification
1	AS Abadi	6	5	1	0	20	2	+18	16	Champions
2	Tornado F.C.	6	4	1	1	16	7	+9	13	
3	Nabil F.C.	6	3	1	2	20	11	+9	10	
4	Gempuri F.C.	6	3	0	3	11	6	+5	9	
5	KS Tiga Naga	6	3	0	3	10	9	+1	9	
6	PS Petalangan	6	2	2	2	15	6	+9	8	
7	PS Siak	7	1	1	5	17	26	−9	4	
8	Flamboyan F.C.	7	1	0	6	7	47	−40	3	

Updated to match(es) played on 19 August 2018. Source:
