= 2018 Liga 3 Lampung =

Liga 3 Lampung
- Season: 2018
- Champions: Putrad PB

The 2018 Liga 3 Lampung is a qualifying round for the national round of 2018 Liga 3. Persilat, the winner of the 2017 Liga 3 Lampung are the defending champions. The competition will begin on August 2, 2018.

== Group stage ==
The 6 probable teams to compete are mentioned below. This stage scheduled starts on 25 July 2018.

=== Group A ===
Pos	Team	Pld	W	D	L	GF	GA	GD	Pts	Qualification
1	Persilat	0	0	0	0	0	0	0	0	Advance to next round
2	Persilamtim	0	0	0	0	0	0	0	0	Advance to next round
3	Bina Bangsa	0	0	0	0	0	0	0	0	
4	Persilab	0	0	0	0	0	0	0	0	
5	Persituba	0	0	0	0	0	0	0	0	

Updated to match(es) played on 25 August 2018. Source:

=== Group B ===
Pos	Team	Pld	W	D	L	GF	GA	GD	Pts	Qualification
1	Bandar Lampung	0	0	0	0	0	0	0	0	Advance to next round
2	Tanggamus Farmers	0	0	0	0	0	0	0	0	Advance to next round
3	Putrad PB	0	0	0	0	0	0	0	0	
4	SS Lampung	0	0	0	0	0	0	0	0	

Updated to match(es) played on 25 August 2018. Source:

== Knockout stage ==
Semi-finals

Final
08 August
Putrad PB	1 (5)
SS Lampung	1 (4)
