= 2018 Liga 3 West Sumatra =

Liga 3 Sumatra Barat
- Season: 2018
- Champions: Solok

The 2018 Liga 3 West Sumatra is a qualifying round for the national round of 2018 Liga 3. Batang Anai F.C., the winner of the 2017 Liga 3 West Sumatra are the defending champions. The competition will begin on June 30, 2018.

== Format ==
In this competition, 19 teams are divided into 3 groups of five and 1 groups of four. The two best teams are through to knockout stage. The winner will represent West Sumatra in national round of 2018 Liga 3.

== Teams ==
There are initially 19 clubs which will participate the league in this season.

== First round ==
This stage scheduled starts on 2 July 2018.

=== Group A ===
- All matches will be held at Padang Pariaman

Pos	Team	Pld	W	D	L	GF	GA	GD	Pts	Qualification
1	PesPessel South Coast	4	3	1	0	5	1	+4	10	Advance to next round
2	Batang Anai F.C.	4	2	2	0	9	2	+7	8	Advance to next round
3	Persepak Payakumbuh	4	2	0	2	6	4	+2	6	
4	Piaman F.C.	4	1	1	2	2	6	−4	4	
5	PSPP Padang Panjang	4	0	0	4	1	10	−9	0	

Updated to match(es) played on 7 July 2018. Source:

=== Group B ===
- All matches will be held at Lima Puluh Kota

Pos	Team	Pld	W	D	L	GF	GA	GD	Pts	Qualification
1	Gasliko Lima Puluh Kota	4	4	0	0	14	2	+12	12	Advance to next round
2	PSKB Bukittinggi	4	3	0	1	9	3	+6	9	Advance to next round
3	PSKPS Pasaman	4	2	0	2	7	5	+2	6	
4	PSBS Batusangkar	4	1	0	3	8	8	0	3	
5	Taruna Mandiri F.C.	3	0	0	3	1	21	−20	0	

Updated to match(es) played on 7 July 2018. Source:

=== Group C ===
- All matches will be held at Agam

Pos	Team	Pld	W	D	L	GF	GA	GD	Pts	Qualification
1	Solok F.C.	4	4	0	0	9	2	+7	12	Advance to next round
2	PSP Padang	4	3	0	1	14	5	+9	9	Advance to next round
3	PS Pasbar West Pasaman	4	2	0	2	11	9	+2	6	
4	Limkos F.C.	4	1	0	3	7	11	−4	3	
5	PSKA Agam	4	0	0	4	1	15	−14	0	

Updated to match(es) played on 7 July 2018. Source:

=== Group D ===
- All matches will be held at Sijunjung

Pos	Team	Pld	W	D	L	GF	GA	GD	Pts	Qualification
1	Persiju Sijunjung	3	2	1	0	9	4	+5	7	Advance to next round
2	PS GAS Sawahlunto	3	2	0	1	6	2	+4	6	Advance to next round
3	Persikopa Kota Pariaman	3	1	1	1	14	6	+8	4	
4	Gumarang F.C.	3	0	0	3	1	18	−17	0	

Updated to match(es) played on 29 June 2018. Source:

== Second round ==
This stage scheduled starts on 18 July 2018.

=== Group E ===
Pos	Team	Pld	W	D	L	GF	GA	GD	Pts	Qualification
1	Solok F.C.	3	2	1	0	4	1	+3	7	Advance to next round
2	PesPessel South Coast	3	1	2	0	3	1	+2	5	Advance to next round
3	PS GAS Sawahlunto	3	1	1	1	4	4	0	4	
4	PSKB Bukittinggi	3	0	0	3	0	5	−5	0	

Updated to match(es) played on 20 July 2018. Source:

=== Group F ===
Pos	Team	Pld	W	D	L	GF	GA	GD	Pts	Qualification
1	Persiju Sijunjung	3	2	1	0	7	3	+4	7	Advance to next round
2	Batang Anai	3	1	2	0	5	2	+3	5	Advance to next round
3	PSP Padang	3	1	1	1	7	5	+2	4	
4	Gasliko 50 Kota	3	0	0	3	2	11	−9	0	

Updated to match(es) played on 20 July 2018. Source:

== Final Round ==
This stage scheduled starts on 27 July 2018.

Pos	Team	Pld	W	D	L	GF	GA	GD	Pts	Qualification
1	Solok F.C. (A)	3	3	0	0	5	0	+5	9	Advance to next round
2	Batang Anai F.C. (A)	3	1	1	1	6	4	+2	4	Advance to next round
3	PesPessel South Coast	3	0	2	1	2	4	−2	2	
4	Persiju Sijunjung	3	0	1	2	1	6	−5	1	

Updated to match(es) played on 28 July 2018. Source:
(A) Advance to a further round
