= Septian Bagaskara =

Indonesian footballer (born 1997)

Personal information
- Full name: Septian Satria Bagaskara
- Date of birth: 26 September 1997 (age 29)
- Place of birth: Kediri, Indonesia
- Height: 1.83 m (6 ft 0 in)
- Position: Striker

Team information
- Current team: Garudayaksa
- Number: 20

Youth career
- 2004–2015: SSB Triple'S
- 2015: Manchester United Soccer School

Senior career*
Years	Team	Apps	(Gls)
2016	Persedikab Kediri	0	(0)
2017–2022	Persik Kediri	56	(30)
2018	→ Persekat Tegal (pinjeman)	10	(3)
2022–2023	RANS Nusantara	31	(4)
2023–2026	Dewa United	59	(11)
2026	→ Persis Solo (pinjeman)	7	(0)
2026–	Garudayaksa	0	(0)

International career^{‡}
2019	Indonesia U23	1	(0)
- * Club domestic league appearances and goals as of 2 May 2026 ‡ National team caps and goals as of 7 June 2019

Septian Satria Bagaskara (born 26 September 1997) is an Indonesian professional footballer who plays as a striker for Super League club Garudayaksa.

== Club career ==
=== Persik Kediri ===
Born in Kediri, Bagaskara started his professional career with Persedikab Kediri in 2016, In 2017 Bagaskara joined Persik Kediri. On 25 November 2019 Persik successfully won the 2019 Liga 2 Final and promoted to Liga 1, after defeated Persita Tangerang 3–2 at the Kapten I Wayan Dipta Stadium, Gianyar.

==== Persekat Tegal (loan) ====
He was signed for Persekat Tegal to play in Liga 3 Regional route: Central Java in the 2018 season, on loan from Persik Kediri.

=== RANS Nusantara ===
Bagaskara was signed for RANS Nusantara to play in Liga 1 in the 2022–23 season. He made his league debut on 23 July 2022 in a match against PSIS Semarang at the Jatidiri Stadium, Semarang. On 29 July 2022, Bagaskara scored his first league goals for the team with scored two goals in a 3–3 draw over PSS Sleman at the Pakansari Stadium. On 9 December 2022, Bagaskara scored in the 44th minute and saved RANS Nusantara from losing to Persikabo 1973. score draw 1–1. A week later he scored in a 2–1 win over Bhayangkara.

== International career ==
He made his international debut for Indonesia U23 on 7 June 2019 against Thailand U23 at 2019 Merlion Cup.

== Honours ==
=== Club ===
Persik Kediri

- Liga 2: 2019
- Liga 3: 2018

=== Individual ===
- Liga 3 Top Goalscorer: 2018 (21 goals)
