= 2018 Liga 3 North Sumatra =

Liga 3 Sumatra Utara
- Season: 2018
- Champions: PSDS Deli Serdang

The 2018 Liga 3 North Sumatra is a qualifying round for the national round of 2018 Liga 3. PSDS Deli Serdang, the winner of the 2017 Liga 3 North Sumatra are the defending champions. The competition will begin on July 1, 2018.

== Format ==
In this competition, 28 teams are divided into 8 groups. The two best teams are through to knockout stage. The winner will represent North Sumatra in national round of 2018 Liga 3.

== Teams ==
There are initially 28 clubs which will participate the league in this season.

== First round ==
This stage scheduled starts on 01 July 2018.

=== Group A ===
Pos	Team	Pld	W	D	L	GF	GA	GD	Pts	Qualification
1	PS Kwarta (A)	3	2	1	0	14	4	+10	7	Advance to next round
2	Medan Sakti F.C. (A)	3	2	1	0	10	4	+6	7	Advance to next round
3	PSSA Asahan	3	1	0	2	6	6	0	3	
4	Agtagana F.C.	3	0	0	3	2	18	−16	0	

Updated to match(es) played on 21 August 2018. Source:
(A) Advance to a further round

=== Group B ===
Pos	Team	Pld	W	D	L	GF	GA	GD	Pts	Qualification
1	PSDS Deli Serdang	3	3	0	0	11	0	+11	9	Advance to next round
2	Tanjung Balai United	3	1	1	1	9	3	+6	4	Advance to next round
3	Taruna Satria	3	1	0	2	2	12	−10	3	
4	Patriot Disporasu	3	0	1	2	2	9	−7	1	

Updated to match(es) played on 21 August 2018. Source:

=== Group C ===
Pos	Team	Pld	W	D	L	GF	GA	GD	Pts	Qualification
1	Bhinneka (A)	2	2	0	0	5	1	+4	6	Advance to next round
2	Sergai (A)	2	1	0	1	2	3	−1	3	Advance to next round
3	Deli Serdang United	2	0	0	2	0	3	−3	0	

Updated to match(es) played on 21 August 2018. Source:
(A) Advance to a further round

=== Group D ===
Pos	Team	Pld	W	D	L	GF	GA	GD	Pts	Qualification
1	TGM (A)	3	2	1	0	11	4	+7	7	Advance to next round
2	Keluarga U.S.U (A)	3	2	0	1	5	3	+2	6	Advance to next round
3	Mencirim City F.C.	3	1	1	1	7	6	+1	4	
4	PLN Sumut	3	0	0	3	4	14	−10	0	

Updated to match(es) played on 21 August 2018. Source:
(A) Advance to a further round

=== Group E ===
Pos	Team	Pld	W	D	L	GF	GA	GD	Pts	Qualification
1	Medan Utama F.C. (A)	2	2	0	0	8	3	+5	6	Advance to next round
2	Kurnia Medan City F.C. (A)	2	1	0	1	3	6	−3	3	Advance to next round
3	Medan Soccer F.C.	2	0	0	2	3	4	−1	0	

Updated to match(es) played on 21 August 2018. Source:
(A) Advance to a further round

=== Group F ===
Pos	Team	Pld	W	D	L	GF	GA	GD	Pts	Qualification
1	Harjuna Putra (A)	2	1	1	0	3	0	+3	4	Advance to next round
2	Bina Sentra A. Kumbang	2	0	0	2	1	4	−3	0	Advance to next round
3	Gumarang F.C. (A)	2	0	2	0	1	1	0	2	

Updated to match(es) played on 21 August 2018. Source:
(A) Advance to a further round

=== Group G ===
Pos	Team	Pld	W	D	L	GF	GA	GD	Pts	Qualification
1	Madina Jaya FC (A)	2	2	0	0	6	1	+5	6	Advance to next round
2	RBS Padang Sidempuan F.C. (A)	2	1	0	1	5	4	+1	3	Advance to next round
3	Palas	2	0	0	2	3	9	−6	0	

Updated to match(es) played on 21 August 2018. Source:
(A) Advance to a further round

=== Group H ===
Pos	Team	Pld	W	D	L	GF	GA	GD	Pts	Qualification
1	Toba Samosir F.C. (A)	2	2	0	0	8	2	+6	6	Advance to next round
2	Mandailing Raya F.C. (A)	2	1	0	1	4	3	+1	3	Advance to next round
3	Bintang Utara R. Prapat	2	0	0	2	1	8	−7	0	

Updated to match(es) played on 21 August 2018. Source:
(A) Advance to a further round

== Second round ==
This stage scheduled starts on 18 July 2018.

=== Group I ===
Pos	Team	Pld	W	D	L	GF	GA	GD	Pts	Qualification
1	Toba Samosir F.C.	0	0	0	0	0	0	0	0	Advance to next round
2	Bhinneka	0	0	0	0	0	0	0	0	Advance to next round
3	Sergai	0	0	0	0	0	0	0	0	
4	Kurnia Medan City F.C.	0	0	0	0	0	0	0	0	

Updated to match(es) played on 21 August 2018. Source:

=== Group J ===
Pos	Team	Pld	W	D	L	GF	GA	GD	Pts	Qualification
1	Tanjung Balai United	3	3	0	0	5	2	+3	9	Advance to next round
2	Keluarga U.S.U	3	1	1	1	3	2	+1	4	Advance to next round
3	Harjuna Putra	3	1	1	1	5	5	0	4	
4	Medan Sakti F.C.	3	0	0	3	1	5	−4	0	

Updated to match(es) played on 21 August 2018. Source:

=== Group K ===
Pos	Team	Pld	W	D	L	GF	GA	GD	Pts	Qualification
1	PS Kwarta	0	0	0	0	0	0	0	0	Advance to next round
2	Medan Utama F.C.	0	0	0	0	0	0	0	0	Advance to next round
3	TGM	0	0	0	0	0	0	0	0	
4	Madina Jaya FC	0	0	0	0	0	0	0	0	

Updated to match(es) played on 21 August 2018. Source:

=== Group L ===
Pos	Team	Pld	W	D	L	GF	GA	GD	Pts	Qualification
1	Gumarang F.C.	0	0	0	0	0	0	0	0	Advance to next round
2	Mandailing Raya F.C.	0	0	0	0	0	0	0	0	Advance to next round
3	RBS Padang Sidempuan F.C.	0	0	0	0	0	0	0	0	
4	PSDS Deli Serdang	0	0	0	0	0	0	0	0	

Updated to match(es) played on 21 August 2018. Source:

== Knockout stage ==
Top 8
Keluarga U.S.U	2
Bhinneka	3
Medan Utama F.C.	5
Gumarang F.C.	2
Tanjung Balai United	1
Toba Samosir F.C.	0
PSDS Deli Serdang	2
PS Kwarta	0

Semi-finals
Bhinneka	0
Medan Utama F.C.	1
Tanjung Balai United	2
PSDS Deli Serdang	5

Final
Medan Utama F.C.	1
PSDS Deli Serdang	3
Third place play-off
Tanjung Balai United	1
Bhinneka	2
