= 2018 Liga 3 Riau Islands =

Liga 3 Riau Islands
- Season: 2018
- Champions: PS Putra Kundur

The 2018 Liga 3 Riau Island is a qualifying round for the national round of 2018 Liga 3. PS Bintan, the winner of the 2017 Liga 3 Riau Islands are the defending champions. The competition will begin on August 2, 2018.

== Group stage ==
The 6 probable teams to compete are mentioned below. This stage scheduled starts on 02 August 2018.

=== Group A ===
| Pos | Team | Pld | W | D | L | GF | GA | GD | Pts | Qualification |
|---|---|---|---|---|---|---|---|---|---|---|
| 1 | PS Putra Kundur (A) | 2 | 2 | 0 | 0 | 4 | 1 | +3 | 6 | Advance to next round |
| 2 | Persedas Lingga (A) | 2 | 1 | 0 | 1 | 2 | 1 | +1 | 3 | Advance to next round |
| 3 | PS Batam | 2 | 0 | 0 | 2 | 1 | 5 | −4 | 0 | |

Updated to match(es) played on 20 July 2018. Source:
(A) Advance to a further round

=== Group B ===
| Pos | Team | Pld | W | D | L | GF | GA | GD | Pts | Qualification |
|---|---|---|---|---|---|---|---|---|---|---|
| 1 | PS Karimun (A) | 2 | 1 | 0 | 1 | 5 | 4 | +1 | 3 | Advance to next round |
| 2 | PS Bintan Muda (A) | 2 | 1 | 0 | 1 | 2 | 2 | 0 | 3 | Advance to next round |
| 3 | PS Natuna | 2 | 1 | 0 | 1 | 3 | 4 | −1 | 3 | |

Updated to match(es) played on 20 July 2018. Source:
(A) Advance to a further round

== Knockout stage ==
Semi-finals
06 August
PS Putra Kundur | 2
PS Bintan Muda | 0
06 August
PS Karimun | 2
Persedas Lingga] | 0

Final
07 August
PS Putra Kundur | 4
PS Karimun | 2
