= PSCS Cilacap =

Association football team in Indonesia

- Full name: Persatuan Sepakbola Cilacap dan Sekitarnya
- Nicknames: Laskar Nusakambangan (en: Nusakambangan Warriors); Hiu Selatan (en: Southern Sharks)
- Short name: CLP; PSCS
- Founded: 19 April 1950; 76 years ago
- Ground: Wijayakusuma Stadium
- Capacity: 15,000
- President: Bambang Tujiatno
- Manager: Fanny Irawatie
- Coach: Roffy Wikongsinarjo
- League: Liga 4
- 2024–25: Liga Nusantara/Relegation Round (Group J), 5th (relegated)
| Home colours | Away colours | Third colours |

Persatuan Sepakbola Cilacap dan Sekitarnya (simply known as PSCS Cilacap) is an Indonesian football club based in Cilacap Regency, Central Java. They currently compete in the Liga 4. In 2018, the club was promoted to the Liga 2 after became the runner-up of 2018 Liga 3.

== Players ==
=== Current squad ===
As of 5 January 2025

Note: Flags indicate national team as defined under FIFA eligibility rules; some limited exceptions apply. Players may hold more than one non-FIFA nationality.

| No. | Pos. | Nation | Player |
|---|---|---|---|
| 1 | GK | IDN | Firza Ridwan |
| 2 | DF | IDN | Putra Arrafi |
| 5 | DF | IDN | Ananda Ramadhan |
| 6 | DF | IDN | Yoga Riski |
| 7 | FW | IDN | Dhiyaz Saputra |
| 9 | MF | IDN | Ichsan Hari Kurniawan |
| 10 | FW | IDN | Tri Handoko |
| 11 | MF | IDN | Ruly Putra |
| 12 | GK | IDN | Iqbal Lesmana |
| 13 | MF | IDN | Robi Kriswantoro (captain) |
| 14 | FW | IDN | Adrian Maulana |
| 15 | DF | IDN | Dicky Ricardo |
| 17 | MF | IDN | Omar Albaar |
| 19 | MF | IDN | Rifky Bakhtiar |

| No. | Pos. | Nation | Player |
|---|---|---|---|
| 20 | FW | IDN | Jenico Riski |
| 21 | FW | IDN | Wildan Mukhalladun |
| 22 | MF | IDN | Haviv Mumtaza |
| 23 | FW | IDN | Malik Kaldi |
| 27 | DF | IDN | Adrian Nudin |
| 28 | DF | IDN | Muhammad Roby |
| 29 | MF | IDN | Wahyudya Perdana |
| 32 | DF | IDN | Ahmad Rasyadan |
| 57 | FW | IDN | Papua Komboy |
| 58 | DF | IDN | Satria Karya |
| 70 | DF | IDN | Dimas Rakasena |
| 77 | GK | IDN | Khusnul Wahyu |
| 78 | GK | IDN | Raihan Ably |
| 87 | DF | IDN | Fidthian Maulana |
| 99 | MF | IDN | Syahrur Ramadhani |

== Coaching staff ==
| Position | Name |
|---|---|
| Head coach | (Indonesia) Roffy Wikongsinarjo |
| Assistant coach | (Indonesia) Supriyono Prima |
| Assistant coach | (Indonesia) Jimmy Suparno |
| Physical coach | (Indonesia) Satyo Husodo |
| Goalkeeper coach | (Indonesia) Usman Pribadi |

== Season-by-season records ==
| Season(s) | League/Division | Tier | Tms. | Pos. | Piala Indonesia | AFC/AFF competition(s) | |
|---|---|---|---|---|---|---|---|
| 2006 | Third Division | 4 | | Eliminated in Provincial round | – | – | – |
| 2007–08 | Third Division | 4 | | | – | – | – |
| 2008–09 | Second Division | 4 | 82 | Promoted | – | – | – |
| 2009–10 | First Division | 3 | 60 | 3 | – | – | – |
| 2010–11 | Premier Division | 2 | 39 | 9th, Group 2 | – | – | – |
| 2011–12 | Premier Division (LPIS) | 2 | 28 | 4th, Group 2 | – | – | – |
| 2013 | Premier Division | 2 | 38 | 2nd, Second round | – | – | – |
| 2014 | Premier Division | 2 | 63 | 3rd, Third round | – | – | – |
| 2015 | Premier Division | 2 | 55 | season abandoned | – | – | – |
| 2016 | Indonesia Soccer Championship B | 2 | 53 | 1 | – | – | – |
| 2017 | Liga 2 | 2 | 61 | 2nd, Relegation round | – | – | – |
| 2018 | Liga 3 | 3 | 32 | 2 | Second round | – | – |
| 2019 | Liga 2 | 2 | 24 | 5th, West division | Second round | – | – |
| 2020 | Liga 2 | 2 | 24 | season abandoned | – | – | – |
| 2021–22 | Liga 2 | 2 | 24 | 3rd, Group C | – | – | – |
| 2022–23 | Liga 2 | 2 | 28 | season abandoned | – | – | – |
| 2023–24 | Liga 2 | 2 | 28 | 3rd, Relegation round | – | – | – |
| 2024–25 | Liga Nusantara | 3 | 16 | 5th, Relegation round | – | – | – |
| 2025–26 | | | | | | | |

== Honours ==
- Liga Indonesia First Division
  - Third-place (1): 2009–10
- Indonesia Soccer Championship B
  - Champion (1): 2016
- Liga 3
  - Runner-up (1): 2018
