= Kartika Vedhayanto =

Indonesian footballer

Personal information
- Full name: Kartika Vedhayanto Putra
- Date of birth: 25 January 2002 (age 24)
- Place of birth: Semarang, Indonesia
- Height: 1.72 m (5 ft 8 in)
- Position: Right-back

Team information
- Current team: Sumsel United
- Number: 26

Youth career
- 2018–2019: PPLP Jawa Tengah
- 2019: Garuda Select
- 2019–2021: PSIS Semarang

Senior career*
Years	Team	Apps	(Gls)
2021–2023	PSIS Semarang	14	(0)
2023–2026	Madura United	13	(0)
2026–	Sumsel United	1	(0)

International career
2017–2018	Indonesia U16	4	(0)
Medal record
Men's football
Representing Indonesia
AFF U-16 Youth Championship
Winner	2018 Indonesia
- * Club domestic league appearances and goals as of 26 September 2026

Kartika Vedhayanto Putra (born 25 January 2002) is an Indonesian professional footballer who plays as a right-back for Championship club Sumsel United.

== Club career ==
=== PSIS Semarang ===
He was signed for PSIS Semarang to play in Liga 1 in the 2021 season. Vedhayanto made his professional debut on 15 October 2021 in a match against Persik Kediri at the Manahan Stadium, Surakarta.

=== Madura United ===
Vedhayanto was signed for Madura United to play in Liga 1 in the 2023–24 season.

== Career statistics ==
=== Club ===
As of 24 May 2025

Club	Season	League		Cup		Continental		Other		Total	
Club	Season	Apps	Goals	Apps	Goals	Apps	Goals	Apps	Goals	Apps	Goals
PSIS Semarang	2021–22	7	0	0	0	0	0	0	0	7	0
PSIS Semarang	2022–23	7	0	0	0	0	0	0	0	7	0
PSIS Semarang	Total	14	0	0	0	0	0	0	0	14	0
Madura United	2023–24	7	0	0	0	0	0	0	0	7	0
Madura United	2024–25	6	0	0	0	–		0	0	6	0
Madura United	2025–26	0	0	0	0	–		0	0	0	0
Career total		27	0	0	0	0	0	0	0	27	0

== Honours ==
=== International ===
Indonesia U-16

- AFF U-16 Youth Championship: 2018
