= Gelora Kie Raha Stadium =

Stadium in North Maluku, Indonesia

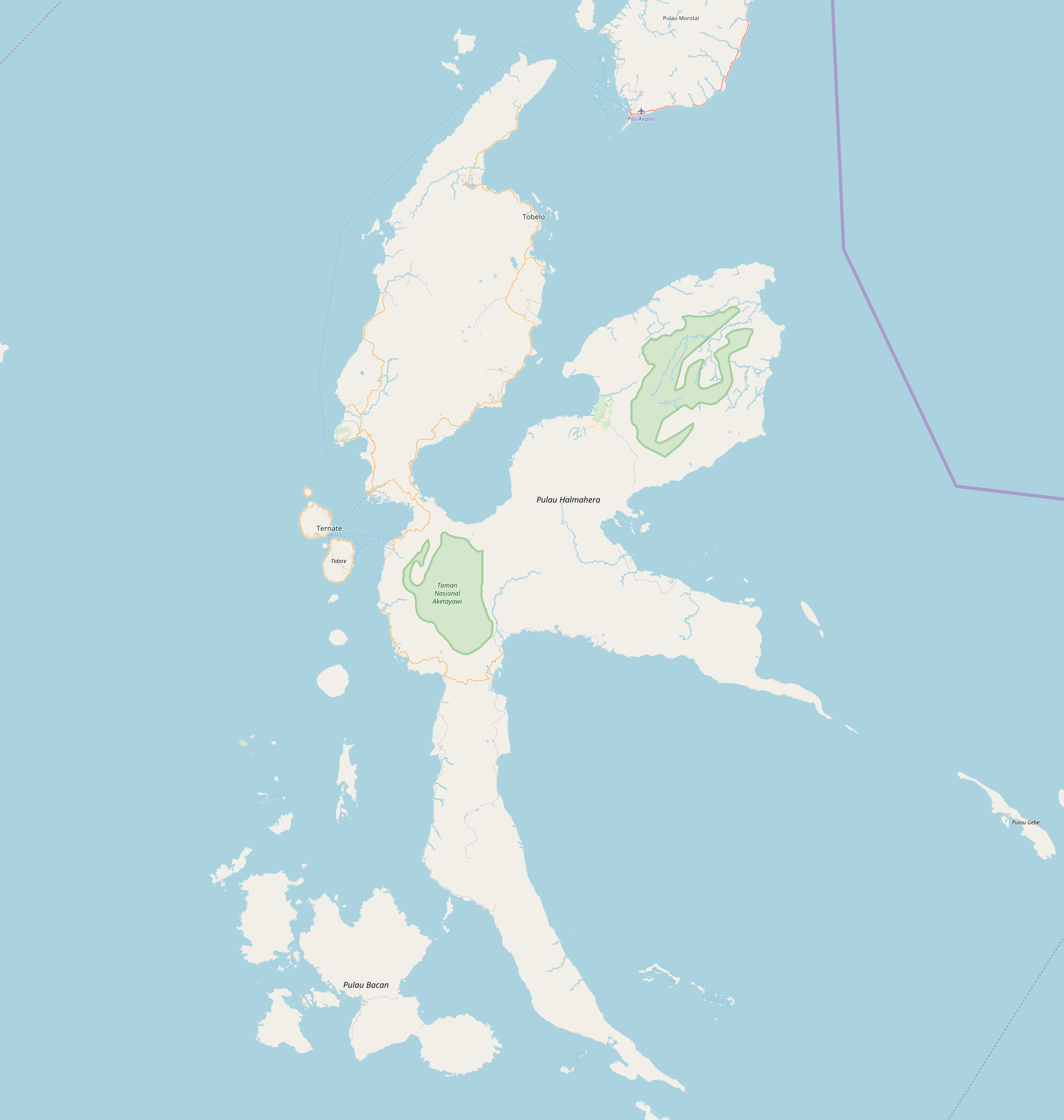
- Location in Halmahera
- Location: Ternate City, North Maluku, Indonesia
- Coordinates: 0.786316°N 127.381889°E
- Owner: City government of Ternate
- Operator: City government of Ternate
- Capacity: 15,000
- Surface: Grass field

Construction
- Opened: 1958
- Renovated: 2024

Tenants
- Persiter Ternate; Malut United (2024–2026)

Gelora Kie Raha Stadium is a multi-use stadium in Ternate City, North Maluku, Indonesia. It is currently used mostly for football matches and is used as the home stadium for Persiter Ternate. The stadium has been inaugurated since 1958, currently with a capacity of 15,000 people.

== History ==
Malut United did some renovations while their stadium passed the Liga 1 verification in 2024. The renovation cost Rp11 billion.
