= 2018 Liga 3 Papua =

Liga 3 Papua
- Season: 2018
- Champions: Persemi

The 2018 Liga 3 Papua is a qualifying round for the national round of 2018 Liga 3. Persewar Waropen, the winner of the 2017 Liga 3 Papua are the defending champions. The competition will begin on 30 June 2018.

== Format ==
In this competition, 20 teams are divided into 2 groups of seven and 1 groups of six. The two best teams are through to knockout stage. The winner will represent Papua in national round of 2018 Liga 3.

== Teams ==
There are initially 20 clubs which will participate the league in this season.

== Group stage ==
This stage scheduled starts on 30 June 2018.

=== Group A ===
Pos	Team	Pld	W	D	L	GF	GA	GD	Pts	Qualification
1	Persindug	0	0	0	0	0	0	0	0	Advance to next round
2	Persintan	0	0	0	0	0	0	0	0	Advance to next round
3	Persimi	0	0	0	0	0	0	0	0	
4	PS Elang Brimob	0	0	0	0	0	0	0	0	
5	Nafri	0	0	0	0	0	0	0	0	
6	Persidafon	0	0	0	0	0	0	0	0	
7	Persiker	0	0	0	0	0	0	0	0	

Updated to match(es) played on 30 June 2018. Source: Asprov PSSI Papua

=== Group B ===
Pos	Team	Pld	W	D	L	GF	GA	GD	Pts	Qualification
1	Persimer	0	0	0	0	0	0	0	0	Advance to next round
2	Persipuja	0	0	0	0	0	0	0	0	Advance to next round
3	Biak United	0	0	0	0	0	0	0	0	
4	Waribo	0	0	0	0	0	0	0	0	
5	Persemar	0	0	0	0	0	0	0	0	
6	Persemi	0	0	0	0	0	0	0	0	
7	Nabire Putra	0	0	0	0	0	0	0	0	

Updated to match(es) played on 30 June 2018. Source: Asprov PSSI Papua

=== Group C ===
Pos	Team	Pld	W	D	L	GF	GA	GD	Pts	Qualification
1	Persitoli	0	0	0	0	0	0	0	0	Advance to next round
2	Emsyk	0	0	0	0	0	0	0	0	Advance to next round
3	PS Harapan Putra	0	0	0	0	0	0	0	0	
4	Sarmi	0	0	0	0	0	0	0	0	
5	Persewar	0	0	0	0	0	0	0	0	
6	Persiyamo	0	0	0	0	0	0	0	0	

Updated to match(es) played on 30 June 2018. Source: Asprov PSSI Papua
