= Mini Cibinong Stadium =

Multi-use stadium in Cibinong, Bogor, Indonesia

Mini Cibinong Stadium Persikabo Stadium
- Tegar Beriman Stadium
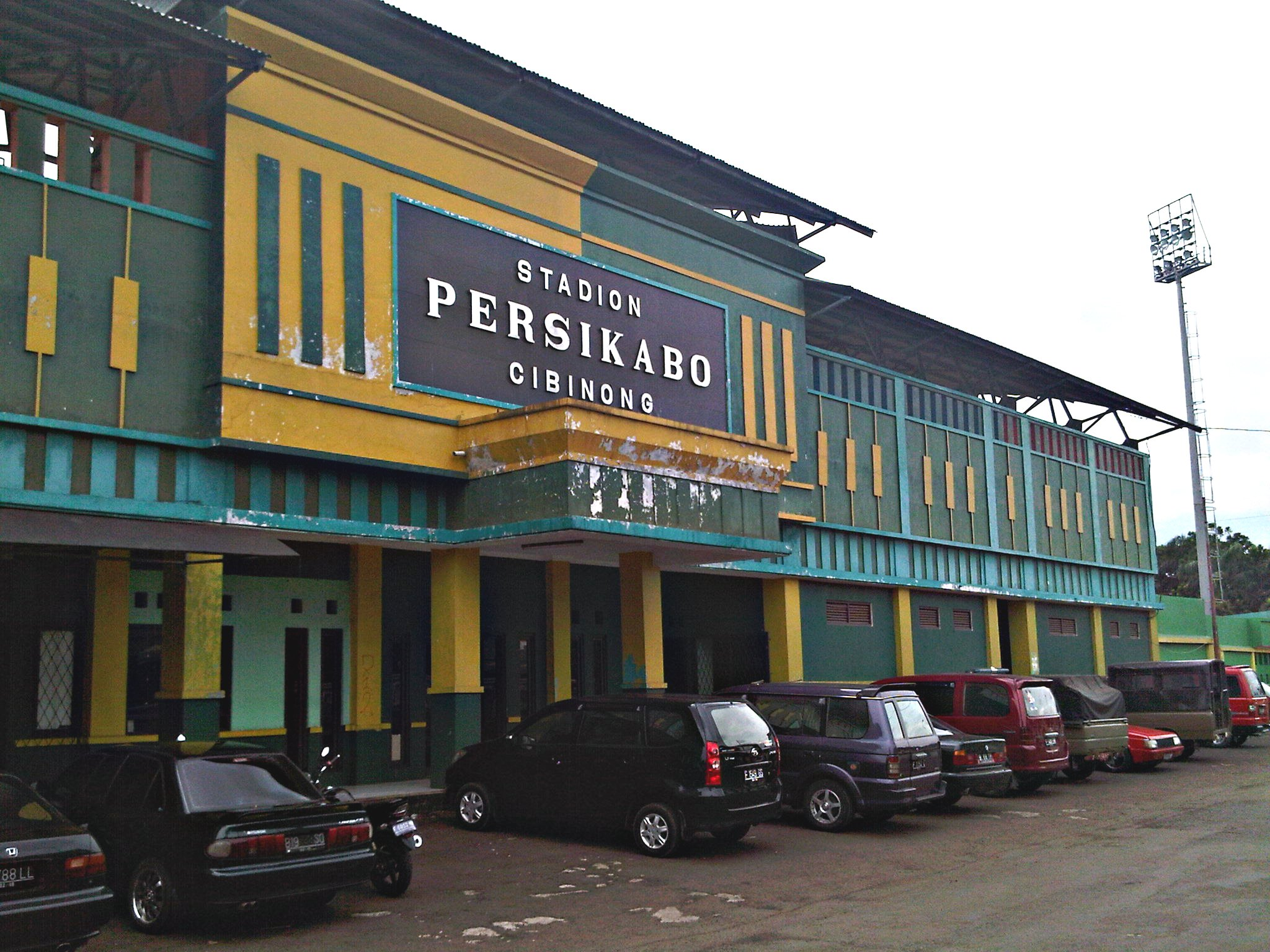
- Front view

- Location in Bogor Regency
- Location: Cibinong, Bogor Regency, West Java, Indonesia
- Coordinates: 6.476573°S 106.825181°E
- Owner: Bogor Regency Government
- Operator: Bogor Regency Government
- Capacity: 15,000
- Surface: Grass field

Construction
- Opened: N/A

Tenant
- Persikabo Bogor

Mini Cibinong Stadium or Persikabo Stadium (previously known as the Tegar Beriman Stadium) is a multi-use stadium in Cibinong, Bogor, Indonesia. It is currently used training stadium of Persikabo Bogor. The stadium holds 15,000 people.
