= Wijayakusuma Stadium =

Multi-purpose stadium in Cilacap, Indonesia

Coordinates: 7°41′43″S 109°02′03″E

Wijaya Kusuma Stadium
- Interactive map of Wijaya Kusuma Stadium
- Location: Cilacap Regency, Central Java, Indonesia
- Owner: Government of Cilacap Regency
- Operator: Government of Cilacap Regency
- Capacity: 10,000
- Surface: Grass field

Construction
- Renovated: 2015

Tenant
- PSCS Cilacap

Wijaya Kusuma Stadium (Stadion Wijaya Kusuma) is a multi-purpose stadium in the town of Cilacap, Indonesia. The stadium has a capacity of 10,000 people.

It is the home base of PSCS Cilacap. The stadium is always full of spectators every time PSCS Cilacap play the home game.
