= Jimmy Suparno =

Indonesian footballer

Personal information
- Full name: Jimmy Suparno
- Date of birth: February 20, 1984 (age 42)
- Place of birth: Cilacap, Indonesia
- Height: 1.67 m (5 ft 6 in)
- Positions: Midfielder; defender

Senior career*
Years	Team	Apps	(Gls)
2002−2003	Persipura Jayapura	12	(0)
2003–2005	Deltras Sidoarjo	50	(7)
2005−2006	Persijap Jepara	28	(3)
2007−2008	Deltras Sidoarjo	30	(0)
2008−2013	Persela Lamongan	124	(12)
2013−2014	Gresik United	9	(0)
2014	Arema Cronous	2	(0)
2015	Persiram Raja Ampat	2	(0)
2016−2019	PSCS Cilacap	41	(4)

International career
2001−2003	Indonesia U19		
2003−2007	Indonesia U23		
2005	Indonesia	1	(0)
- * Club domestic league appearances and goals as of 17:25, 9 January 2019 (UTC)

Jimmy Suparno (born February 20, 1984) is an Indonesian former footballer who played as a midfielder.

== Career ==
In January 2015, he signed with Persiram.

== Honours ==
=== Club ===
PSCS Cilacap

- Indonesia Soccer Championship B: 2016
