= Persiter Ternate =

Indonesian football club

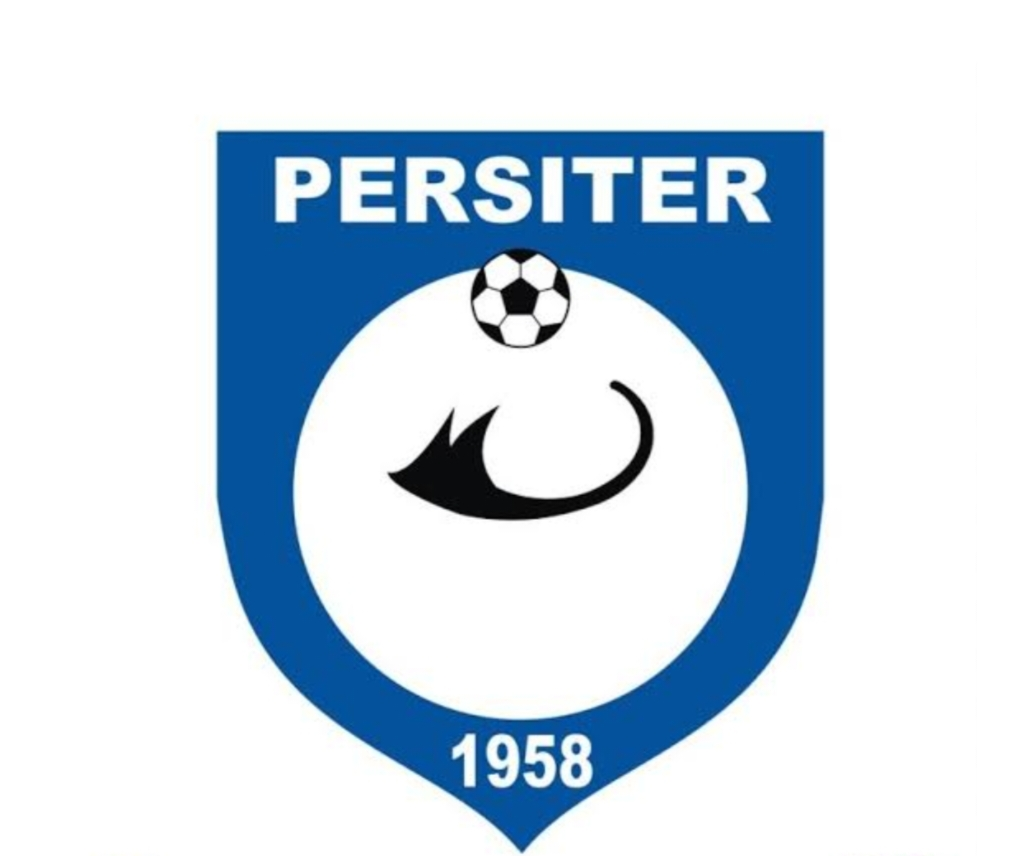
- Full name: Persatuan Sepakbola Indonesia Ternate
- Nicknames: Laskar Kie Raha (Kie Raha Warrior); Ikan Pari (Stingray Fish)
- Founded: 1958; 68 years ago
- Ground: Gelora Kie Raha; Ternate, North Maluku
- Capacity: 15,000
- Owner: Askot PSSI Ternate
- Chairman: Syamsir Andili
- Manager: Rizal Marsaoly
- Coach: Ahmad Loja Idrus
- League: Liga 4
- 2022–23: 3rd, (North Maluku zone)
Home colours	Away colours

Persatuan Sepakbola Indonesia Ternate, simply known as Persiter, is an Indonesian football club based in Ternate. They currently compete in the Liga 4 and their home stadium is Gelora Kie Raha.

== Rivalries ==
This team has a history of local rivalry with the Persikota Tidore team whose feud eventually became known as the Old North Maluku derby, a biggest football rivalry in the region.

== Coaching staff ==
Position	Staff
Head coach	(Indonesia) Quwetly Alweni
Assistant coach	(Indonesia) Iskandar
Goalkeeper coach	(Indonesia) Iswan Karim

== Season-by-season records ==
Season(s)	League/Division	Tms.	Pos.	Piala Indonesia
1994–95	Second Division		3	–
1995–96	First Division	24	5th, East group	–
1996–97	First Division	20	4th, Second round	–
1997–98	First Division	season abandoned		–
1998–99	First Division	19	3rd, Second round	–
1999–2000	First Division	21	4th, East group	–
2001	First Division	23	3rd, East group	–
2002	First Division	27	First round	–
2003	First Division	26	6	–
2004	First Division	24	9th, East division	–
2005	First Division	27	3	Round of 16
2006	Premier Division	28	9th, East division	First round
2007–08	Premier Division	36	6th, East division	First round
2008–09				
2009–10
2010–11
2011–12
2013
2014
2015
2016	ISC Liga Nusantara	32	Round of 16	–
2017	Liga 3	32	4th, First round	–
2018	Liga 3	32	Eliminated in Regional round	Second round
2019	Liga 3	32	3rd, First round	Second round
2020	Liga 3	season abandoned		–
2021–22	Liga 3	64	Eliminated in provincial round	–
