= Galuh Stadium =

Multi-purpose stadium in the city of Ciamis, Indonesia

Coordinates: 7°20′03″S 108°21′23″E

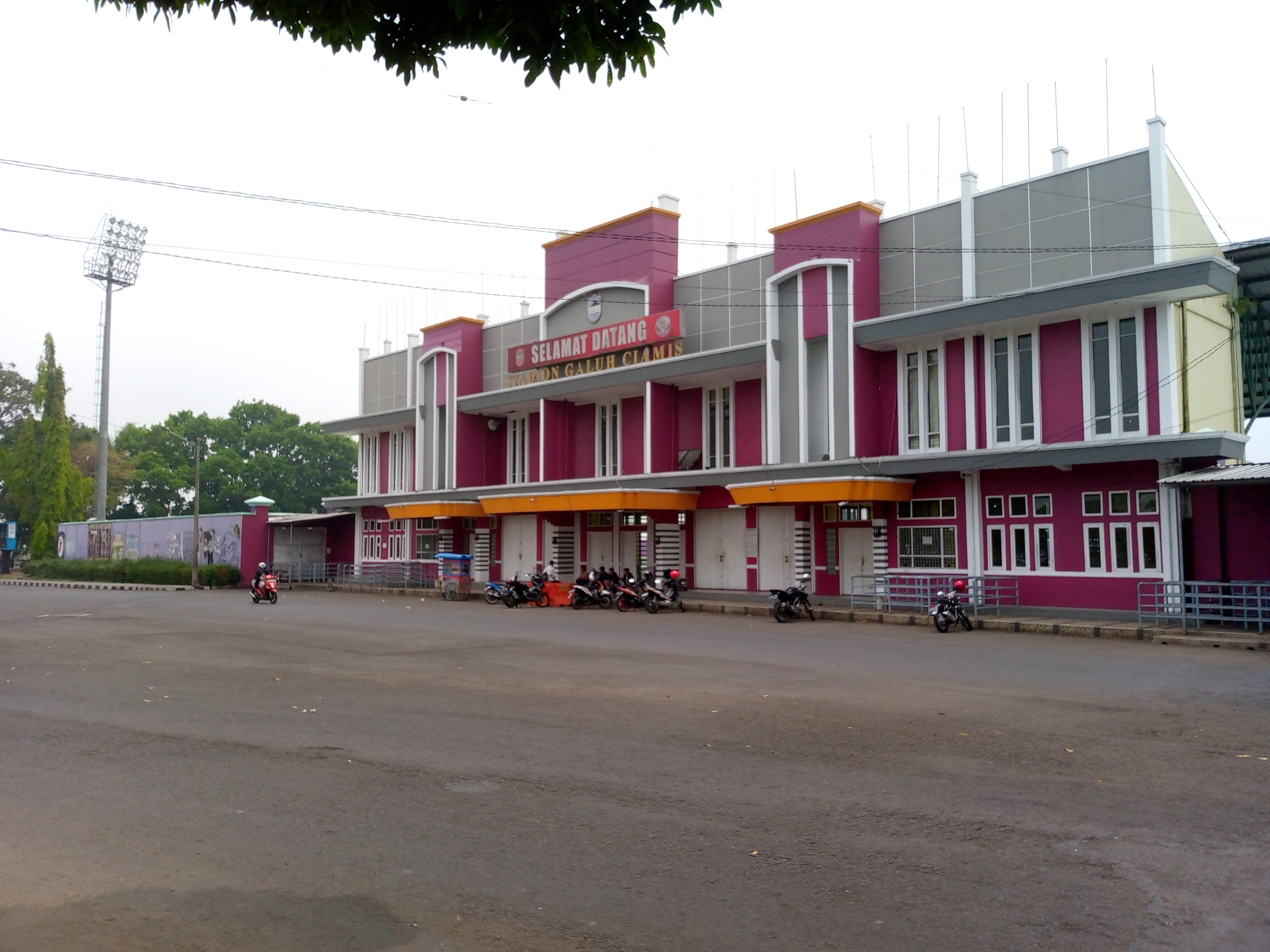
- Interactive map of Galuh Stadium
- Location: Ciamis Regency, West Java, Indonesia
- Owner: Government of Ciamis Regency
- Operator: Government of Ciamis Regency
- Capacity: 20,000
- Surface: Grass field

Tenants
- PSGC Ciamis; Galuh

Galuh Stadium (Stadion Galuh) is a multi-purpose stadium in the city of Ciamis, Indonesia. The stadium has a capacity of 20,000 people.

It is the home base of PSGC Ciamis and Galuh FC.
