= Persebri Batanghari F.C. =

Indonesian football club

Persebri Batanghari
- Full name: Persatuan Sepakbola Batanghari Football Club
- Nickname: Laskar Tapah Malenggang (Tapah Malenggang Warriors)
- Founded: 2014; 12 years ago
- Ground: KONI Batanghari Stadium
- Capacity: 10,000
- Owner: Askab PSSI Batanghari
- Coach: Oktavianus
- League: Liga 4
- 2025–26: 1st (Jambi zone); First round, 3rd in Group E (National phase)
Home colours	Away colours

Persatuan Sepakbola Batanghari Football Club, commonly known as Persebri Batanghari FC or formerly known as Batanghari Football Club, is an Indonesian football club based in Batanghari Regency, Jambi. They currently compete in the Liga 4 Jambi zone.

== Honours ==
- Liga 3 Jambi
  - Champions (2): 2018, 2023
- Liga 4 Jambi
  - Champions (2): 2024–25, 2025–26
