= Persem Mojokerto =

Association football team in Indonesia

- Full name: Persatuan Sepakbola Mojokerto
- Nickname(s): Laskar Damarwulan (Damarwulan Warriors); Badai Biru (Blue Storm)
- Founded: 1931; 94 years ago
- Ground: Gelora Ahmad Yani Stadium; Mojokerto, East Java
- Capacity: 10,000
- Owner: Askot PSSI Mojokerto
- Chairman: Joko Rustianto
- Manager: Elwi Wijaya
- Coach: Mahfudin Budi Santoso
- League: Liga 4
- 2024–25: 3rd, in Group N (East Java zone)
Home colours	Away colours

Persatuan Sepakbola Mojokerto (simply known as Persem Mojokerto) is an Indonesian football club based in Mojokerto, East Java. They currently compete in the Liga 4.

== Honours ==
- Liga Indonesia Third Division
  - Champion: 2007
