= Kotabaru F.C. =

Indonesian football club

Kotabaru
- Full name: Kotabaru Football Club
- Nickname: Ikan Todak (The Swordfish)
- Short name: KTB
- Founded: 2017; 9 years ago
- Ground: Bamega Stadium; Kotabaru, South Kalimantan
- Capacity: 1,500
- Owner: Sayed Andi Makmur Al-Idrus
- Coach: Mochammad Hasan
- League: Liga 4
- 2023: Semi-finals, (South Kalimantan zone)
Home colours	Away colours

Kotabaru Football Club is an Indonesian football club based in Kotabaru, South Kalimantan. They currently play at Liga 4.

== Honours ==
- Liga 3 South Kalimantan
  - Champions (1): 2018
  - Runner-up (2): 2019, 2022
