= 2017 Bali United F.C. season =

Indonesian football club season

Bali United
2017 season
- Chairman: Pieter Tanuri
- Head Coach: Indra Sjafri (until 1 February); Hans-Peter Schaller (from 1 February until 26 April); Eko Purdjianto (caretaker) (from 26 April until 10 May); Widodo Cahyono Putro (from 10 May)
- Stadium: Kapten I Wayan Dipta Stadium
- Liga 1: 2nd
- Top goalscorer: Sylvano Comvalius (37)
- Highest home attendance: 23,220 (vs Arema, 8 October)
- Lowest home attendance: 6,042 (vs Barito Putera, 14 July)
Home colours	Away colours	Third colours

The 2017 season was the third season of competitive association football and second season in the Liga 1 (previously named Indonesia Super League) played by Bali United Football Club, a professional football club based in Gianyar, Bali, Indonesia. As the 2015 Indonesia Super League discontinued, it meant it was their second successive season in Liga 1.

In the transfer window, Bali United surprised the public when they successfully signed Irfan Bachdim and Dutch-born naturalized Stefano Lilipaly. They also signed Sylvano Comvalius and Marcos Flores to fill their foreign players quota. Nick van der Velden, the 2008–09 Eredivisie winner with AZ was signed as marquee player. The club kept hold of Ahn Byung-keon as their Asian quota player. Several players were released before the campaign got under way; defender Bobby Satria left to play for Sriwijaya, Rully Desrian joined Bhayangkara while Zoran Knežević, Nemanja Vidaković, and Daniel Heffernan were without a club. Bali United were also left by their first manager, Indra Sjafri who was appointed as Indonesia national under-19 football team head coach. He was replaced by former Persiba head coach, Hans-Peter Schaller.

Bali United began the season in bad form with two defeats in a row which resulted in the dismissal of Hans-Peter Schaller. They slowly bounce back when Widodo Cahyono Putro took charge in May 2017, and even became runner-ups in the first half of the season. They continued their impressive form until the last match and finishing second in the table, same points with eventual winners Bhayangkara but lost in head-to-head results. Thirty one different players represented the club in the league and there were 12 different goalscorers. Bali United's top goalscorer was Sylvano Comvalius, who scored 37 goals in 34 games. Comvalius also broke the record of Peri Sandria who scored 34 goals in single season which lasted for 22 years and became league top scorer.

== Background ==
The 2016 season was Indra Sjafri's second start to a season as manager of Bali United, having taken charge since the club's founded. They competed in a full season league formatted tournament, Indonesia Soccer Championship A because Indonesia Super League was temporarily suspended. Bali United completed their first full-season campaign in 12th with 10 wins, 10 draws, 14 loses, and 40 points.

== Pre-season and friendlies ==
=== Friendlies ===
Friendlies match details
Date	Opponent	Venue	Result	Scorers
13 March – 16:30	PSS	Sleman (A)	1–2	Comvalius
3 April – 16:00	Celebest	Legian (N)	1–2	Martinus
8 April – 18:00	Persib	Bandung (A)	2–1	Bachdim, Yabes
26 May – 20:30	Indonesia U22s	Gianyar (H)	1–0	Comvalius

=== Indonesia President's Cup ===
Indonesia President's Cup match details
Date	Round	Opponent	Venue	Result	Scorers	Attendance	Referee
7 February – 19:30	Group stage	Sriwijaya	Gianyar (N)	2–2	Marcos, Rahman	18,257	Muslimin
13 February – 19:30	Group stage	Pusamania Borneo	Gianyar (N)	0–0		7,515	Prasetyo Hadi
18 February – 16:00	Group stage	Barito Putera	Gianyar (N)	1–2	Ahn Byung-keon	7,529	Djumadi Effendi

=== Trofeo Bali Island Cup ===
Trofeo Bali Island Cup match details
Date	Round	Opponent	Venue	Result	Scorers	Referee
31 March – 18:30	Trofeo match 1	Celebest	Gianyar (N)	0–0 (3–0 p)		I Made Puja
31 March – 21:30	Trofeo match 3	757 Kepri Jaya	Gianyar (N)	3–1	Rahman (2), Comvalius	Ali Mustofa

== Review and events ==
=== April–July ===
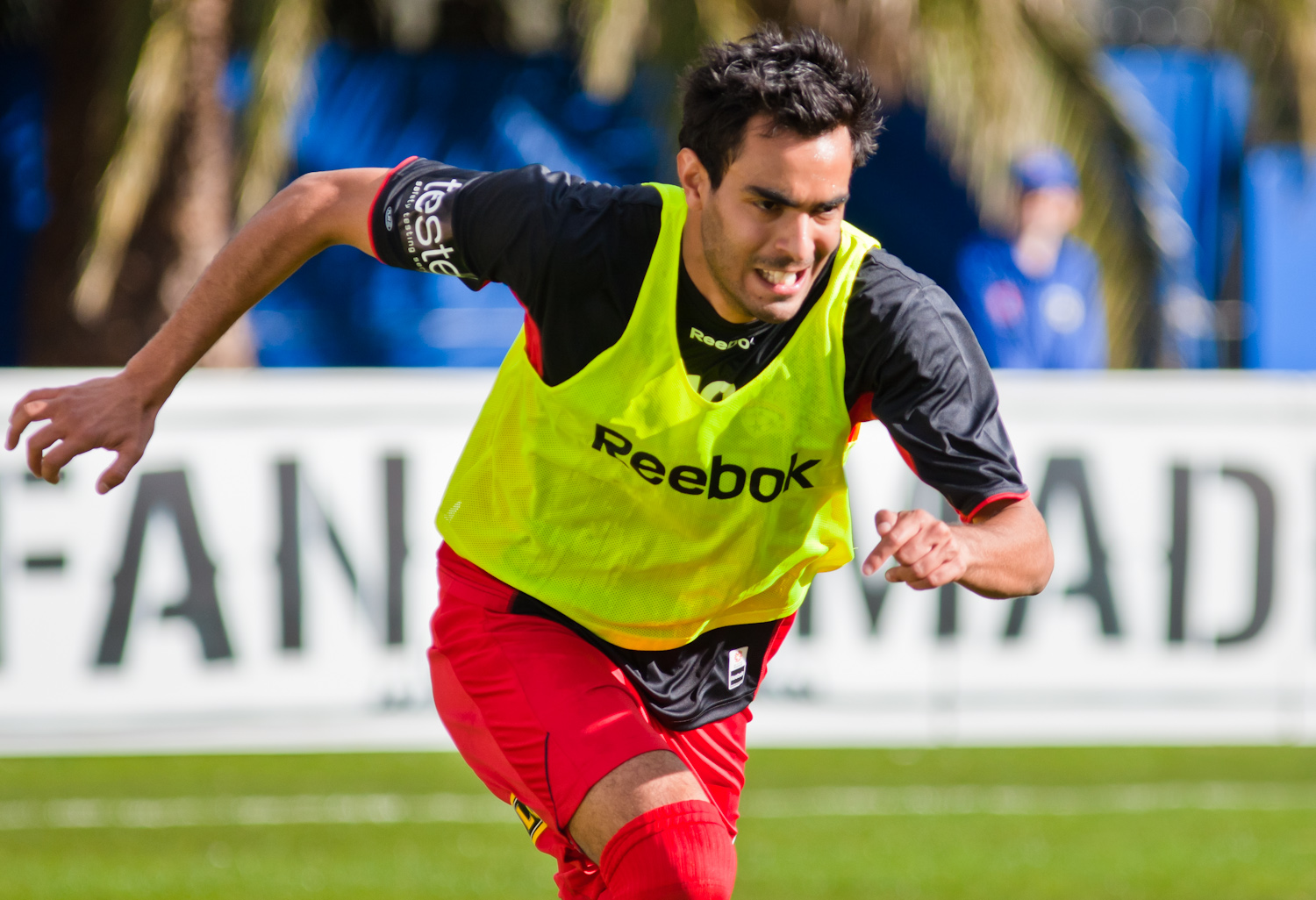
Marcos Flores scored Bali United's winning goal against Persela in April.

A trip to the Gelora Ratu Pamelingan Stadium to face Madura United on the opening weekend of the season ended in a 2–0 defeat; the first goals, scored by Bali United's former player Bayu Gatra in the 32nd minute. A handball from Ahn Byung-keon inside the penalty area earn Madura United a penalty, converted by Peter Odemwingie in the 73rd minute. Bali United hosted Persipura a week after. Marinus Wanewar scored after three minutes for the visitors, before Sylvano Comvalius equalized 28 minutes later. But an own goal from Abdul Rahman Sulaiman in the 42nd minute gave Persipura a 2–1 win. That defeat resulted in the dismissal of head coach Hans-Peter Schaller. Eko Purjianto then took charge as caretaker. At the Surajaya Stadium on 30 April, a penalty goal by Marcos Flores earned Bali United a 1–0 win against Persela.

In early May, Flores and Comvalius each scored as Semen Padang were beaten by two goals. Bali United lost their match six days later, away to Mitra Kukar at Aji Imbut Stadium. Comvalius finished off a header to lead for Bali United. Hendra Bayauw and Anindito Wahyu scored and made a comeback for the host to win the match. At the same night in Bali, Bali United introduced their new head coach Widodo Cahyono Putro. In Widodo's first match, Yabes Roni scored twice for Bali United in a 3–0 win against Borneo. The team then played out a goalless draw against Persija, when I Made Wardana successfully thwarting a penalty from Luiz Júnior. Bali United ended May with a 1–0 home win against the defending champions Persib. Flores scored the winning goal in the first half against his former club.

Bali United then faced Perseru on the first weekend of June at their home stadium, but as away team. Comvalius scored an early lead in the 5th minute and then scored again six minutes later. Sílvio Escobar scored for Perseru narrowed the score, but Irfan Bachdim's first goal for Bali United sealed a 3–1 win. They suffered two consecutive defeats: at home to Bhayangkara and away to Arema.

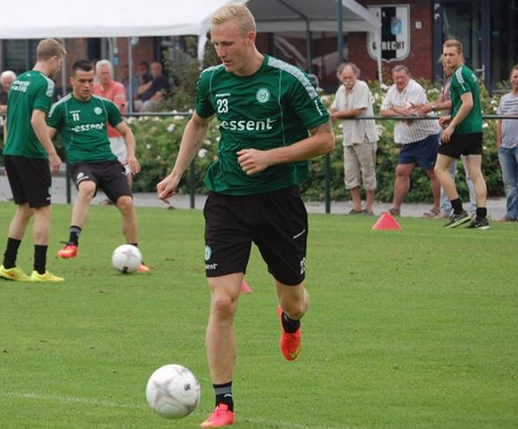
Nick van der Velden scored his first goal for Bali United in July.

Due to Lebaran, Bali United did not play another game for two weeks. On the resumption of club football, they faced Persiba at home. Goals from Nick van der Velden and Comvalius earned a 2–0 win for the team. Five days later Bali United faced PS TNI at Pakansari Stadium. Bali United began the match the better of the two teams and took the lead after 19 minutes when Bachdim scored. Three minutes later, Comvalius increase the advantage before Élio Martins scored made it 1–2. Bachdim scored his second goal in this match 10 minutes before half time. Erwin Ramdani and Facundo Talín equalized for PS TNI, and the visitors went in front after Fadil Sausu converted a corner kick right into the goal. The final score was 3–4 for Bali United. Bali United recorded the biggest win in their history so far, against Barito Putera at Kapten I Wayan Dipta Stadium. Comvalius scored twice in a 5–0 victory. The fourth match of July was against Sriwijaya at Gelora Sriwijaya Stadium. Comvalius scored to put Bali United in front in the 3rd minute. Sriwijaya replied with two goals from Beto Gonçalves and Yanto Basna, but van der Velden in 64th minute equalized for the away team with a volley. At home to PSM on 23 July, the team earned three points courtesy of Comvalius, Flores, and Miftahul Hamdi. Bali United's next game was away to Persegres Gresik United. An own goal in the first half and two second half goals by Comvalius and Fadil gave Bali United a comfortable win. After 17 games, Bali United accumulated 32 points and lay second in the league table.

=== August–November ===
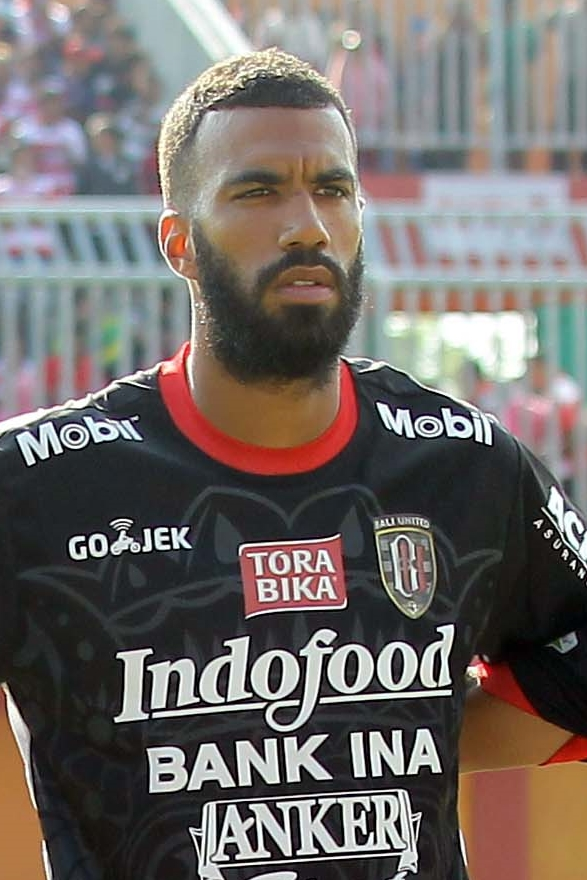
Sylvano Comvalius scored a quin-trick against Mitra Kukar in August.

Bali United lost their first match of August, away to Persipura at Mandala Stadium. Sylvano Comvalius finished off a one-touch move to narrowed the score for Bali United. Bali United faced Madura United at Kapten I Wayan Dipta Stadium. Nick van der Velden opened the scoring for the host after five minutes and Comvalius scored twice made it 3–0. In spite of Fabiano Beltrame's penalty narrowed it to 3–1, Comvalius completed his hat-trick in the 62nd minute from a penalty. I Gede Sukadana scored the fifth goal for the home team before Bayu Gatra made it 5–2. As the match against Persela was postponed due to Indonesian Independence Day week, Bali United traveled to Semen Padang on 24 August and claimed a 3–1 victory. Bali United recorded the second five-goal margin win this season, against Mitra Kukar at Kapten I Wayan Dipta Stadium. Comvalius scored a quin-trick in a 6–1 victory.

On 3 September, Comvalius scored two goals in Bali United's 5–1 win against Persela in the postponed match. Bali United played out a goalless draw with Borneo on 11 September. Four days later, they faced Persija, where Comvalius and Irfan Bachdim sealed a 2–1 victory. The team then played out a goalless draw against Persib. Goals from Bachdim and midfielder Marcos Flores against Perseru, gave the team an eighth straight unbeaten in the league. At Patriot Chandrabhaga Stadium, Bali United lost 3–2 to the league leaders Bhayangkara; midfielder Paulo Sérgio scored twice and an own goal from I Made Andhika Wijaya widening the gap between two teams.

Bali United again recorded their most goals scored, against Arema at Kapten I Wayan Dipta Stadium. An inspired performance by Stefano Lilipaly helped the team win 6–1; created his first and second goals for the team in the second half. Eight days later, Bali United conceding two in the final four minutes to throw away a 2–1 lead against Persiba. Bali United's form improved as the season drew to a close. At home to PS TNI on 20 October, the team earned three points courtesy of Comvalius' brace. Comvalius scored the goal in Bali United's match against Barito Putera to save the team from losing and the team moved back to first position with a home win against Sriwijaya – Comvalius scored another brace.

"Thank you to all of you. I know everyone must be sad because we are not champions. But all of Indonesia also knows who the real champion is. Bali United is the winner!"

— Irfan Bachdim after Bali United's last match, 12 November.

Bali United defeated PSM 1–0 on 6 November in a horror ending as the home supporter went riot after the match. The win made closer to win the title. But the decision from PSSI disciplinary committee to awarded a 3–0 win for Bhayangkara due to Mitra Kukar played an illegal player during the match between the two, made Bali United's chance to win their first major title disappear. Even though Bhayangkara lost their last match against Persija and Bali United won against Persegres Gresik United, Bali United lost the head-to-head results with Bhayangkara.

== Match results ==
=== Liga 1 ===
Pos	Team	Pld	W	D	L	GF	GA	GD	Pts	Qualification or relegation
1	Bhayangkara (C)	34	22	2	10	61	40	+21	68 (Note: Head-to-head results: Bali United 1–3 Bhayangkara; Bhayangkara 3–2 Bali United.)	
2	Bali United	34	21	5	8	76	38	+38	68	Qualification for the AFC Champions League preliminary round 1 (Note: Bhayangkara failed to obtain an AFC license to participate in Asian competitions. As a result, Bali United, the league runners-up, entered the qualifying play-offs.)
3	PSM	34	19	8	7	67	38	+29	65	
4	Persija	34	17	10	7	48	24	+24	61	Qualification for the AFC Cup group stage (Note: PSM failed to obtain an AFC license to participate in Asian competitions. As a result, Persija, the league 4th place, entered the group stage.)
5	Persipura	34	17	9	8	64	37	+27	60	

Source: Go-Jek Traveloka Liga 1, Soccerway
Rules for classification: 1) Points; 2) Head-to-head; 3) Goal Difference; 4) Goals Scored; 5) Drawing.
(C) Champions
Notes:

Liga 1 match details
Date	Week	Opponent	Venue	Result	Scorers	Attendance	Referee	Position
16 April – 16:00	1	Madura United	Pamekasan (A)	0–2		6,198	Abdul Rahman Salasa	17
23 April – 16:00	2	Persipura	Gianyar (H)	1–2	Comvalius	7,417	Bachrul Ulum	17
30 April – 16:00	3	Persela	Lamongan (A)	1–0	Flores	11,800	Faulur Rosy	15
4 May – 16:00	4	Semen Padang	Gianyar (H)	2–0	Flores, Comvalius	6,254	Jerry Elly	9
10 May – 19:30	5	Mitra Kukar	Tenggarong (A)	1–2	Comvalius	3,451	Novari Ikhsan	14
14 May – 19:30	6	Borneo	Gianyar (H)	3–0	Ahn Byung-keon, Yabes (2)	9,312	Aprisman Aranda	7
21 May – 19:30	7	Persija	Bekasi (A)	0–0		23,200	Kusni	11
31 May – 21:30	8	Persib	Gianyar (H)	1–0	Flores	11,087	Musthofa Umarella	6
4 June – 20:15	9	Perseru	Gianyar (A)	3–1	Comvalius (2), Bachdim	8,311	Ikhsan Prasetya Jati	4
9 June – 21:30	10	Bhayangkara	Gianyar (H)	1–3	Comvalius	13,937	Rully Ruslin Tambuntina	5
17 June – 21:30	11	Arema	Malang (A)	0–2		11,430	Oki Dwi Putra	9
5 July – 16:00	12	Persiba	Gianyar (H)	2–0	van der Velden, Comvalius	7,044	Thoriq Alkatiri	7
10 July – 19:30	13	PS TNI	Bogor (A)	4–3	Bachdim (2), Comvalius, Fadil	264	Untung	5
14 July – 16:00	14	Barito Putera	Gianyar (H)	5–0	Fadil, Comvalius (2), Flores, Sukarja	6,042	Rihendra Purba	4
19 July – 19:30	15	Sriwijaya	Palembang (A)	2–2	Comvalius, van der Velden	7,120	Annas Apriliandi	5
23 July – 19:30	16	PSM	Gianyar (H)	3–0	Flores, Comvalius, Hamdi	14,220	Djumadi Effendi	4
31 July – 19:30	17	Persegres Gresik United	Lamongan (A)	3–1	Faris (o.g.), Fadil, Comvalius	1,015	Asep Yandis	2
9 August – 14:30	18	Persipura	Jayapura (A)	1–3	Comvalius	16,128	Agus Fauzan	4
13 August – 19:30	19	Madura United	Gianyar (H)	5–2	van der Velden, Comvalius (3), Sukadana	21,572	(Australia) Shaun Evans	2
24 August – 19:30	21	Semen Padang	Padang (A)	3–1	Comvalius, Flores, Bachdim	6,812	(Kyrgyzstan) Spartak Danilenko	1
27 August – 16:00	22	Mitra Kukar	Gianyar (H)	6–1	Comvalius (5), van der Velden	10,256	Dodi Setia Purnama	1
3 September – 19:30	20	Persela	Gianyar (H)	5–1	Comvalius (2), van der Velden, Bachdim, Taufiq	16,749	Asep Yandis	1
11 September – 19:30	23	Borneo	Samarinda (A)	0–0		7,625	(Kyrgyzstan) Rysbek Shekerbekov	2
15 September – 19:30	24	Persija	Gianyar (H)	2–1	Comvalius, Bachdim	21,439	Yeni Krisdianto	2
21 September – 16:00	25	Persib	Bandung (A)	0–0		23,515	(Kyrgyzstan) Rysbek Shekerbekov	2
25 September – 19:30	26	Perseru	Gianyar (H)	2–0	Bachdim, Flores	9,152	Abdul Rahman Salasa	2
29 September – 19:30	27	Bhayangkara	Bekasi (A)	2–3	Comvalius (2)	3,977	(Kyrgyzstan) Rysbek Shekerbekov	2
8 October – 19:30	28	Arema	Gianyar (H)	6–1	Bachdim, Comvalius (2), Lilipaly (2), Hamdi	23,220	(Iran) Hasan Akrami	2
16 October – 19:30	29	Persiba	Balikpapan (A)	2–3	Lilipaly, Bachdim	12,152	(Kyrgyzstan) Nurgazy Cholponbaev	2
20 October – 19:30	30	PS TNI	Gianyar (H)	2–1	Comvalius (2)	14,099	(Australia) Kris Griffiths-Jones	2
25 October – 16:00	31	Barito Putera	Banjarmasin (A)	1–1	Comvalius	7,451	(Iran) Alireza Faghani	3
30 October – 19:30	32	Sriwijaya	Gianyar (H)	3–2	Comvalius (2), Taufiq	16,350	Thoriq Alkatiri	1
6 November – 19:30	33	PSM	Makassar (A)	1–0	Lilipaly	14,912	(Kyrgyzstan) Eldos Murzabekov	1
12 November – 19:30	34	Persegres Gresik United	Gianyar (H)	3–0	Flores, Comvalius (2)	20,047	Musthofa Umarella	2

== Player details ==
=== Appearances and goals ===
No.	Pos	Nat	Player	Total		Liga 1	
No.	Pos	Nat	Player	Apps	Goals	Apps	Goals
2	DF	(Indonesia) IDN	Amrun Mubarok	1	0	0+1	0
4	DF	(Indonesia) IDN	Mahdi Fahri Albaar	7	0	3+4	0
6	DF	(Indonesia) IDN	Junius R. Bate	4	0	4	0
7	MF	(Indonesia) IDN	Miftahul Hamdi	18	2	2+16	2
8	MF	(Indonesia) IDN	Muhammad Taufiq	30	2	26+4	2
10	FW	(Indonesia) IDN	Irfan Bachdim	30	9	28+2	9
11	MF	(Indonesia) IDN	Yabes Roni	14	2	10+4	2
14	MF	(Indonesia) IDN	Fadil Sausu (captain)	32	3	27+5	3
15	FW	(Indonesia) IDN	Yandi Munawar	11	0	1+10	0
17	MF	(Indonesia) IDN	I Nyoman Sukarja	5	1	3+2	1
21	GK	(Indonesia) IDN	I Made Wardana	17	0	17	0
22	DF	(Indonesia) IDN	Dias Angga Putra	17	0	13+4	0
23	MF	(Netherlands) NED	Nick van der Velden	27	5	19+8	5
24	DF	(Indonesia) IDN	Ricky Fajrin	18	0	17+1	0
26	DF	(Indonesia) IDN	Ngurah Nanak	9	0	7+2	0
27	DF	(Indonesia) IDN	Agus Nova Wiantara	25	0	25	0
28	DF	(Indonesia) IDN	Abdul Rahman Sulaiman	10	0	7+3	0
30	MF	(Indonesia) IDN	Steven Imbiri	1	0	1	0
32	DF	(South Korea) KOR	Ahn Byung-keon	28	1	28	1
33	DF	(Indonesia) IDN	I Made Andhika Wijaya	25	0	22+3	0
37	MF	(Indonesia) IDN	Samsul Pellu	4	0	4	0
44	MF	(Indonesia) IDN	I Gede Sukadana	20	1	11+9	1
45	MF	(Indonesia) IDN	Azka Fauzi	8	0	1+7	0
48	MF	(Argentina) ARG	Marcos Flores	26	8	26	8
59	DF	(Indonesia) IDN	Hasyim Kipuw	18	0	9+9	0
77	GK	(Indonesia) IDN	Alfonsius Kelvan	1	0	0+1	0
81	GK	(Indonesia) IDN	Wawan Hendrawan	17	0	17	0
87	MF	(Indonesia) IDN	Stefano Lilipaly	15	4	11+4	4
92	MF	(Indonesia) IDN	Syakir Sulaiman	12	0	1+11	0
97	GK	(Indonesia) IDN	Diky Indrayana	0	0	0	0
99	FW	(Netherlands) NED	Sylvano Comvalius	34	37	34	37
Players transferred out during the season
18	FW	(Indonesia) IDN	I Made Wirahadi	4	0	0+4	0

- Source: Match results
- Ordered by player's number.

=== Disciplinary record ===
No.	Pos	Nat	Player	Total			Liga 1		
No.	Pos	Nat	Player	Yellow card	Second yellow card	Red card	Yellow card	Second yellow card	Red card
4	DF	(Indonesia) IDN	Mahdi Fahri Albaar	2	0	0	2	0	0
6	DF	(Indonesia) IDN	Junius R. Bate	1	0	0	1	0	0
8	MF	(Indonesia) IDN	Muhammad Taufiq	2	0	0	2	0	0
10	FW	(Indonesia) IDN	Irfan Bachdim	3	0	1	3	0	1
11	MF	(Indonesia) IDN	Yabes Roni	4	0	0	4	0	0
14	MF	(Indonesia) IDN	Fadil Sausu	2	0	0	2	0	0
17	MF	(Indonesia) IDN	I Nyoman Sukarja	1	0	0	1	0	0
22	DF	(Indonesia) IDN	Dias Angga Putra	3	0	0	3	0	0
23	MF	(Netherlands) NED	Nick van der Velden	4	0	0	4	0	0
24	DF	(Indonesia) IDN	Ricky Fajrin	5	0	0	5	0	0
26	DF	(Indonesia) IDN	Ngurah Nanak	4	0	0	4	0	0
27	DF	(Indonesia) IDN	Agus Nova Wiantara	4	0	0	4	0	0
28	DF	(Indonesia) IDN	Abdul Rahman Sulaiman	5	0	0	5	0	0
32	DF	(South Korea) KOR	Ahn Byung-keon	2	0	0	2	0	0
33	DF	(Indonesia) IDN	I Made Andhika Wijaya	5	0	0	5	0	0
44	MF	(Indonesia) IDN	I Gede Sukadana	4	0	0	4	0	0
48	MF	(Argentina) ARG	Marcos Flores	5	0	0	5	0	0
59	DF	(Indonesia) IDN	Hasyim Kipuw	1	0	0	1	0	0
81	GK	(Indonesia) IDN	Wawan Hendrawan	1	0	0	1	0	0
99	FW	(Netherlands) NED	Sylvano Comvalius	1	0	0	1	0	0

- Source: Match results
- Ordered by player's number.
- (yellow card) = Number of bookings; (second yellow card) = Number of sending offs after a second yellow card; (red card) = Number of sending offs by a direct red card.

== Transfers ==
=== Transfers in ===
Date	Pos.	Name	From	Fee	Ref.
5 January	DF	(Indonesia) I Made Andhika Wijaya	Youth sector	Promoted	
5 January	MF	(Indonesia) Samsul Pellu	Youth sector	Promoted	
5 January	MF	(Indonesia) Azka Fauzi	Youth sector	Promoted	
5 January	DF	(Indonesia) Dias Angga Putra	Persib	Free transfer	
5 January	MF	(Indonesia) Muhammad Taufiq	Persib	Free transfer	
5 January	FW	(Indonesia) Yandi Munawar	Persib	Free transfer	
5 January	GK	(Indonesia) I Made Wardana	Arema	Free transfer	
12 January	DF	(Indonesia) Ngurah Nanak	Sriwijaya	Free transfer	
12 January	FW	(Indonesia) Irfan Bachdim	(Japan) Consadole Sapporo	Free transfer	
19 January	MF	(Argentina) Marcos Flores	Persib	Free transfer	
27 January	GK	(Indonesia) Alfonsius Kelvan	Persiba	Free transfer	
1 February	MF	(Indonesia) Jackson Tiwu	PSN	Free transfer	
10 February	FW	(Australia) Ndumba Makeche	(Malaysia) Sarawak	Free transfer	
10 March	FW	(Netherlands) Sylvano Comvalius	(Ukraine) Stal Kamianske	Free transfer	
5 April	GK	(Indonesia) Wawan Hendrawan	Borneo	Free transfer	
5 April	DF	(Indonesia) Amrun Mubarok	Youth sector	Promoted	
25 April	MF	(Netherlands) Nick van der Velden	(Scotland) Dundee United	Free transfer	
4 August	MF	(Indonesia) Steven Imbiri	PS TNI	Free transfer	
12 August	MF	(Indonesia) Stefano Lilipaly	(Netherlands) Cambuur	Free transfer	

=== Transfers out ===
Date	Pos.	Name	To	Fee	Ref.
5 January	GK	(Indonesia) Rully Desrian	Bhayangkara (Note: Joined on 19 December 2016.)	Free transfer	
5 January	MF	(Indonesia) Alsan Sanda	Bhayangkara	Free transfer	
5 January	DF	(Indonesia) Endra Permana	Sriwijaya (Note: Joined on 14 February.)	Free transfer	
5 January	MF	(Indonesia) Hendra Sandi	Sriwijaya	Free transfer	
5 January	MF	(Indonesia) Loudry Setiawan	Persegres (Note: Joined on 23 February.)	Free transfer	
5 January	MF	(Indonesia) Yulius Mauloko	(Timor-Leste) Carsae (Note: Joined on 23 February.)	Free transfer	
5 January	DF	(Indonesia) Bobby Satria	Sriwijaya (Note: Joined on 28 March.)	Free transfer	
5 January	GK	(Indonesia) I Ngurah Komang Arya	Free agent	Released	
5 January	MF	(Indonesia) Leo Guntara	Free agent	Released	
5 January	MF	(Serbia) Zoran Knežević	Free agent	Released	
5 January	FW	(Serbia) Nemanja Vidaković	Free agent	Released	
5 January	FW	(England) Daniel Heffernan	Free agent	Released	
27 February	FW	(Australia) Ndumba Makeche	Free agent	Released	

=== Loans out ===
Start date	Pos.	Name	To	End date	Ref.
14 April	GK	(Indonesia) I Putu Pager Wirajaya	Persikad (Note: Until the end of Persikad's progress in Liga 2.)	End of season	
14 April	DF	(Indonesia) Adi Parwa	Persikad	End of season	
14 April	MF	(Indonesia) Jackson Tiwu	Persikad	End of season	
14 April	FW	(Indonesia) Martinus Novianto	Persikad	End of season	
5 July	DF	(Indonesia) Amrun Mubarok	Persikad	End of season	
5 July	MF	(Indonesia) Samsul Pellu	Persikad	End of season	
29 July	MF	(Indonesia) Azka Fauzi	Celebest (Note: Until the end of Celebest's progress in Liga 2.)	End of season	
25 September	FW	(Indonesia) I Made Wirahadi	PSMS (Note: Until the end of PSMS' progress in Liga 2.)	End of season	
26 September	GK	(Indonesia) Diky Indrayana	Celebest	End of season	
26 September	DF	(Indonesia) Adi Parwa	Celebest	End of season	
26 September	DF	(Indonesia) Junius R. Bate	Celebest	End of season	
26 September	DF	(Indonesia) Mahdi Fahri Albaar	Celebest	End of season	
26 September	FW	(Indonesia) Martinus Novianto	Celebest	End of season	

== Awards ==
- Liga 1
  - Top Goalscorer: Sylvano Comvalius (37 goals)
  - Best XI: Sylvano Comvalius, Irfan Bachdim
