= 2018 Bali United F.C. season =

Indonesian football club season

Bali United
2018 season
- Chairman: Pieter Tanuri
- Head Coach: Widodo Cahyono Putro (until 29 November); Eko Purdjianto (caretaker) (from 29 November)
- Stadium: Kapten I Wayan Dipta Stadium
- Liga 1: 11th
- Piala Indonesia: Round of 32 (Note: Bali United advanced to the round of 32, would be played during 2019 season.)
- Champions League: Preliminary round 2
- AFC Cup: Group stage
- Top goalscorer: League: Stefano Lilipaly (12); All: Ilija Spasojević (14)
- Highest home attendance: 22,210 (vs Persebaya, 18 November)
- Lowest home attendance: 2,154 (vs Global Cebu, 25 April)
| Home colours | Away colours | Third colours |

The 2018 season was the fourth season of competitive association football and third season in the Liga 1 played by Bali United Football Club, a professional football club based in Gianyar, Bali, Indonesia. Their 2nd-place finish in 2017 meant it was their third successive season in Liga 1.

The main addition to the first team was striker Ilija Spasojević as they failed to negotiated new contracts for last season top scorer, Sylvano Comvalius. But they were successfully negotiated new contract with Nick van der Velden. Demerson, former Chapecoense player, and Kevin Brands were signed to complete their foreign players as they retained the service of Ahn Byung-keon. Two Indonesia national under-19 football team players, Feby Eka Putra and Hanis Saghara Putra also joined the team to fulfill under-23 quota. Before the league start, Kevin Brands was replaced by Miloš Krkotić; defender Mahamadou N'Diaye, midfielder Brwa Nouri, and striker Melvin Platje later signed in the second half transfer window to replace Demerson, Miloš Krkotić, and Ahn Byung-keon.

Bali United ended the season 11th, failed to continue their great performance from last season. The club were eliminated in preliminary round 2 of AFC Champions League by Chiangrai United, made them competed in AFC Cup where they were eliminated in the group stage after only finished in 4th. But they were advanced to the round of 32 of Piala Indonesia which would be continued in 2019.

== Background ==
The 2017 season was Indra Sjafri's third start to a season as manager of Bali United, having taken charge since the club's founded. Indra resigned in February 2017 before the start of the season because he was appointed as Indonesia national under-19 football team head coach. He was replaced by Hans-Peter Schaller, but only lasted for two games before being sacked due to two losses in a row. Then Widodo Cahyono Putro took charge in May 2017. Under him, Bali United almost won their first title before a controversial ending as Bhayangkara awarded a 3–0 win against Mitra Kukar and an additional three points. Bali United earn an opportunity to compete in the AFC Champions League because Bhayangkara failed to obtain an AFC license to participate in any Asian competitions.

== Pre-season and friendlies ==
=== Friendlies ===
Friendlies match details
| Date | Opponent | Venue | Result | Scorers |
|---|---|---|---|---|
| 10 January – 15:30 | PSIS | Gianyar (H) | 0–1 | |
| 12 January – 15:30 | Putra Tresna | Seminyak (N) | 7–2 | Saghara (4), Hamdi (2), Yandi |
| 6 May – 16:00 | Bogor | Gianyar (H) | 3–2 | Yandi, Widnyana, Hamdi |
| 31 July – 19:00 | Indonesia U23s | Gianyar (H) | 1–2 (5–4 p) | Sukarja |
| 4 September – 16:00 | Putra Tresna | Gianyar (H) | 10–0 | Yandi (2), Martinus, Spasojević (3), Sukarja (2), Platje, Lilipaly |

=== Indonesia President's Cup ===
Indonesia President's Cup match details
| Date | Round | Opponent | Venue | Result | Scorers | Attendance | Referee |
|---|---|---|---|---|---|---|---|
| 19 January – 16:30 | Group stage | Borneo | Gianyar (N) | 3–2 | Lilipaly (3) | 4,795 | Rully Ruslin Tambuntina |
| 24 January – 16:30 | Group stage | PSPS | Gianyar (N) | 3–2 | Martinus, Sukarja, Azka | 1,957 | Iwan Sukoco |
| 29 January – 20:30 | Group stage | Persija | Gianyar (N) | 3–2 | Spasojević, Brands, Lilipaly | 19,578 | Prasetyo Hadi |
| 3 February – 20:30 | Quarter-finals | Madura United | Surakarta (N) | 2–2 (5–4 p) | Lilipaly, Agung | 6,100 | Musthofa Umarella |
| 11 February – 20:30 | Semi-finals; First leg | Sriwijaya | Palembang (A) | 0–0 | | 25,425 | Oki Dwi Putra |
| 14 February – 20:30 | Semi-finals; Second leg | Sriwijaya | Gianyar (H) | 1–0 | Demerson | 17,476 | Faulur Rosy |
| 17 February – 20:30 | Final | Persija | Jakarta (N) | 0–3 | | 70,255 | Oki Dwi Putra |

== Review and events ==
=== January–April ===
Having finished second in the league last season, Bali United began their AFC Champions League campaign in the qualifying play-offs. They were drawn against S.League runners-up Tampines Rovers, which they won 3–1. Goals from captain Fadil Sausu, Ilija Spasojević, and Hanis Saghara Putra made them through to the preliminary round 2. But they failed to reach the group stage as they were defeated by Chiangrai United in Thailand a week later. This resulted them to played in AFC Cup.

Bali United were drawn into Group G with the runners-up from Myanmar, Philippines, and Vietnam: Yangon United, Global Cebu, and Thanh Hóa. Bali United opened their AFC Cup campaign with a 3–1 defeat against Yangon United. Goals from Sekou Sylla (2) and Emmanuel Uzochukwu can only be replied to one goal by I Gede Sukadana. The team earned a draw away to Global Cebu, but remained bottom of the group.

The team scored three goals in the second half against Thanh Hóa and won 3–1. Followed by a goalless draw in Vietnam against the same team. Bali United hosted the newly promoted PSMS at Kapten I Wayan Dipta on the opening weekend of the league season. A goal from Stefano Lilipaly earned Bali United a 1–0 win.

Bali United began April with a trip to Moch. Soebroto to face PSIS and a goalless draw became the result of this match. They faced Perseru at home. Midfielder Muhammad Taufiq gave the home team a deserved lead, before Sílvio Escobar scored for the visitors and made the game ended in a draw. On 11 April, Bali United continued their campaign in AFC Cup group stage with a 3–2 defeat and destroyed their hopes of qualified for the next round. In the league, for the third time in a row, they got a draw, this time against Persela. They finally got a victory after defeating Barito Putera with goals from Lilipaly and Yandi Munawar. Bali United finished their first AFC Cup campaign at the bottom of the group after they were beaten by Global Cebu at home. The team also ended their April in a bad fashion after a defeat away against PS TIRA.

=== May–August ===
Their losing streak continued into May as they suffered two defeat in a row against Sriwijaya and Mitra Kukar. It ended with a narrow 1–0 win against Arema with a goal from Stefano Lilipaly. Two minor results, a lost to Borneo and a draw against Persib without scoring any goals, closed their May.

Two more points were dropped in Bali United's next match, away to Madura United on the first weekend of June. The hosts had taken the lead before I Nyoman Sukarja and Lilipaly scored for Bali United. But the team conceded the equaliser in 73rd minute. A goal from Lilipaly and Fadil Sausu earned Bali United a 2–0 win the following week, at home to Persipura.

Due to Lebaran, Bali United did not play another game for three weeks. On the resumption of club football, they faced PS West Sumbawa in the first round of the newly reborn Piala Indonesia which ended in a 4–0 win. Five days later, the league continued as Bali United away to Persebaya. Winger Irfan Jaya scored for the hosts eight minute before the final whistle, handed Bali United their fifth lost this season. On 11 July, Ilija Spasojević and Lilipaly scored for Bali United in a 2–0 win against PSM. Six days later, the team played Persija. Two goals of the match were scored by their new striker Melvin Platje and Lilipaly. At home, Bali United lost 3–2 to Bhayangkara; striker Marinus Wanewar scored the winning goal for the visitors and extend the results of their never winning over Bhayangkara since 2016. Bali United ended the month with a 2–1 victory over hosts PSMS; striker Spasojević scoring and Dias Angga Putra adding a further goal.

Bali United's form improved as the second half of the season open. At home to PSIS on 4 August, the team earned three points courtesy of Fadil and Platje. Platje again scored the goal along with Spasojević in Bali United's match against Perseru.

=== September–December ===
In their next match, Bali United defeated Persela by three goals to two; the winner was a penalty scored by Melvin Platje. They were then held by Barito Putera to 1–1 draw. Two more points were dropped in Bali United's next match, at home to PS TIRA on the final day of September.

The first week of October saw Bali United away to Sriwijaya at Gelora Sriwijaya. Sriwijaya managed to lead three goals before Ilija Spasojević and Platje narrowed the score. Bali United defeated Mitra Kukar 1–0 on 15 October 2018 when a goal from Platje secured the win. At Kanjuruhan, Bali United lost 3–1 to Arema; defender Hanif Sjahbandi scored twice against Bali United defense. They ended the October with 2–2 and 1—1 draws against Borneo and Persib respectively.

Starting November, Fadil Sausu and Platje each scored as Madura United were beaten by two goals. After that win, they suffered three lost in a row for the rest of the month. Lost to Persipura 0–1, at home to Persebaya 2–5, and destroyed by PSM 0–4 drop them in the table even more.

In preparation for the final match at home in the league this season, there was a controversy in which Widodo Cahyono Putro suddenly resigned from his position as head coach of the team. In a thrilling match that was stopped several times due to flares from supporters, Bali United suffered a narrow 1–2 defeat from Persija. Bali United lost their final game of the league campaign, away to Bhayangkara. It was a lacklustre performance by the visitors, which conceded two goals inside the 20th minute. They then faced Persekabpas at away in the next round of Piala Indonesia; a goal apiece from Fadil and Spasojević secured a comfortable 2–0 victory.

== Match results ==
=== Liga 1 ===
| Pos | Team | Pld | W | D | L | GF | GA | GD | Pts |
|---|---|---|---|---|---|---|---|---|---|
| 9 | Barito Putera | 34 | 12 | 11 | 11 | 52 | 55 | −3 | 47 |
| 10 | PSIS | 34 | 13 | 7 | 14 | 39 | 42 | −3 | 46 |
| 11 | Bali United | 34 | 12 | 9 | 13 | 44 | 48 | −4 | 45 |
| 12 | Persipura | 34 | 12 | 8 | 14 | 49 | 46 | +3 | 44 |
| 13 | Persela | 34 | 11 | 10 | 13 | 53 | 52 | +1 | 43 |

Source: Go-Jek Liga 1, Soccerway
Rules for classification: 1) Points; 2) Head-to-head; 3) Goal difference; 4) Goals scored; 5) Drawing.

Liga 1 match details
| Date | Week | Opponent | Venue | Result | Scorers | Attendance | Referee | Position |
|---|---|---|---|---|---|---|---|---|
| 24 March – 19:30 | 1 | PSMS | Gianyar (H) | 1–0 | Lilipaly | 17,023 | Maulana Nugraha | 4 |
| 1 April – 16:30 | 2 | PSIS | Magelang (A) | 0–0 | | 11,372 | Novari Ikhsan | 8 |
| 7 April – 19:30 | 3 | Perseru | Gianyar (H) | 1–1 | Taufiq | 17,217 | Untung | 6 |
| 16 April – 19:30 | 4 | Persela | Lamongan (A) | 1–1 | Spasojević | 15,767 | Faulur Rosy | 8 |
| 22 April – 16:30 | 5 | Barito Putera | Gianyar (H) | 2–0 | Lilipaly, Yandi | 12,039 | Thoriq Alkatiri | 4 |
| 30 April – 19:30 | 6 | PS TIRA | Bantul (A) | 1–2 | Lilipaly | 1,877 | Hadiyana | 7 |
| 5 May – 19:00 | 7 | Sriwijaya | Gianyar (H) | 3–4 | Spasojević, Tuasalamony (o.g.), Lilipaly | 12,776 | Prasetyo Hadi | 9 |
| 11 May – 19:30 | 8 | Mitra Kukar | Tenggarong (A) | 1–3 | Lilipaly | 2,418 | Djumadi Effendi | 12 |
| 18 May – 21:30 | 9 | Arema | Gianyar (H) | 1–0 | Lilipaly | 16,095 | Dodi Setia Purnama | 9 |
| 23 May – 21:30 | 10 | Borneo | Samarinda (A) | 0–2 | | 4,731 | Yudi Nurcahya | 12 |
| 27 May – 21:30 | 11 | Persib | Gianyar (H) | 0–0 | | 18,744 | Dwi Purba | 12 |
| 3 June – 21:30 | 12 | Madura United | Bangkalan (A) | 2–2 | Sukarja, Lilipaly | 7,500 | Thoriq Alkatiri | 14 |
| 9 June – 21:30 | 13 | Persipura | Gianyar (H) | 2–0 | Fadil, Lilipaly | 13,875 | Mustofa Umarella | 9 |
| 7 July – 19:30 | 14 | Persebaya | Surabaya (A) | 0–1 | | 27,325 | Hadiyana | 13 |
| 11 July – 19:30 | 15 | PSM | Gianyar (H) | 2–0 | Spasojević, Lilipaly | 15,657 | Moch. Adung | 10 |
| 17 July – 19:30 | 16 | Persija | Bantul (A) | 2–0 | Platje, Lilipaly | 5,798 | Armyn Dwi Suryathin | 8 |
| 21 July – 19:30 | 17 | Bhayangkara | Gianyar (H) | 2–3 | Platje, Dallen | 19,237 | Thoriq Alkatiri | 11 |
| 28 July – 20:15 | 18 | PSMS | Medan (A) | 2–1 | Spasojević, Dias | 10,600 | Prasetyo Hadi | 9 |
| 4 August – 16:30 | 19 | PSIS | Gianyar (H) | 2–0 | Fadil, Platje | 18,650 | Yeni Krisdianto | 5 |
| 10 August – 14:30 | 20 | Perseru | Serui (A) | 2–1 | Spasojević, Platje | 2,400 | Tabrani | 3 |
| 11 September – 16:30 | 21 | Persela | Gianyar (H) | 3–2 | Spasojević, van der Velden, Platje | 16,636 | Novari Ikhsan | 4 |
| 18 September – 16:30 | 22 | Barito Putera | Banjarmasin (A) | 1–1 | Platje | 3,063 | Asep Yandis | 2 |
| 24 September – 19:30 | 23 | PS TIRA | Gianyar (H) | 1–1 | Spasojević | 10,264 | Very Permana | 3 |
| 6 October – 19:30 | 24 | Sriwijaya | Palembang (A) | 2–3 | Spasojević, Platje | 8,535 | Nusur Fadilah | 5 |
| 15 October – 20:00 | 25 | Mitra Kukar | Gianyar (H) | 1–0 | Platje | 9,227 | Iwan Sukoco | 4 |
| 20 October – 16:30 | 26 | Arema | Malang (A) | 1–3 | Bachdim | 0 | Ikhsan Prasetya | 5 |
| 25 October – 19:30 | 27 | Borneo | Gianyar (H) | 2–2 | Andhika, Widnyana | 8,114 | Thoriq Alkatiri | 5 |
| 30 October – 19:30 | 28 | Persib | Balikpapan (A) | 1–1 | Lilipaly | 0 | Dwi Purba | 7 |
| 3 November – 19:30 | 29 | Madura United | Gianyar (H) | 2–0 | Fadil, Platje | 10,627 | Hadiyana | 4 |
| 10 November – 14:30 | 30 | Persipura | Jayapura (A) | 0–1 | | 8,806 | Annas Apriliandi | 6 |
| 18 November – 19:30 | 31 | Persebaya | Gianyar (H) | 2–5 | Spasojević, Platje | 22,210 | Novari Ikhsan | 6 |
| 25 November – 16:30 | 32 | PSM | Makassar (A) | 0–4 | | 14,121 | Mustofa Umarella | 7 |
| 2 December – 19:30 | 33 | Persija | Gianyar (H) | 1–2 | Lilipaly | 20,042 | Djumadi Effendi | 10 |
| 8 December – 19:30 | 34 | Bhayangkara | Jakarta (A) | 0–2 | | 1,500 | Thoriq Alkatiri | 11 |

=== Piala Indonesia ===
Piala Indonesia match details
| Date | Round | Opponent | Venue | Result | Scorers | Referee |
|---|---|---|---|---|---|---|
| 2 July – 16:00 | First round | PS West Sumbawa | West Sumbawa (A) | 4–0 | Wiantara, Yandi, Syarapuddin (o.g.), Martinus | Iwan Sukoco |
| 16 December – 16:00 | Second round | Persekabpas | Pasuruan (A) | 2–0 | Fadil, Spasojević | Muhammad Irham |

=== AFC Champions League ===
AFC Champions League match details
| Date | Round | Opponent | Venue | Result | Scorers | Attendance | Referee |
|---|---|---|---|---|---|---|---|
| 16 January – 20:30 | Preliminary round 1 | (Singapore) Tampines Rovers | Gianyar (H) | 3–1 | Fadil, Spasojević, Saghara | 19,237 | (Japan) Hiroyuki Kimura |
| 23 January – 20:00 | Preliminary round 2 | (Thailand) Chiangrai United | Chiangrai (A) | 1–2 | Spasojević | 5,960 | (India) Rowan Arumughan |

=== AFC Cup ===
| Pos | Team | Pld | W | D | L | GF | GA | GD | Pts | Qualification |
|---|---|---|---|---|---|---|---|---|---|---|
| 1 | (Myanmar) Yangon United | 6 | 4 | 1 | 1 | 15 | 9 | +6 | 13 | Zonal semi-finals |
| 2 | (Philippines) Global Cebu | 6 | 2 | 2 | 2 | 9 | 10 | −1 | 8 | |
| 3 | (Vietnam) FLC Thanh Hóa | 6 | 1 | 3 | 2 | 9 | 11 | −2 | 6 | |
| 4 | (Indonesia) Bali United | 6 | 1 | 2 | 3 | 8 | 11 | −3 | 5 | |

Source: AFC
Rules for classification: Group stage tiebreakers

AFC Cup match details
| Date | Round | Opponent | Venue | Result | Scorers | Attendance | Referee |
|---|---|---|---|---|---|---|---|
| 13 February – 15:30 | Group stage | (Myanmar) Yangon United | Gianyar (H) | 1–3 | Sukadana | 10,542 | (Bahrain) Ammar Mahfoodh |
| 27 February – 19:30 | Group stage | (Philippines) Global Cebu | Manila (A) | 1–1 | Spasojević | 365 | (Malaysia) Suhaizi Shukri |
| 7 March – 15:30 | Group stage | (Vietnam) FLC Thanh Hóa | Gianyar (H) | 3–1 | Yabes, Demerson, Lilipaly | 6,899 | (Syria) Hanna Hattab |
| 13 March – 19:00 | Group stage | (Vietnam) FLC Thanh Hóa | Hanoi (A) | 0–0 | | 4,725 | (United Arab Emirates) Omar Al-Ali |
| 11 April – 17:00 | Group stage | (Myanmar) Yangon United | Yangon (A) | 2–3 | Spasojević, Sukarja | 670 | (Saudi Arabia) Shukri Al-Hunfush |
| 25 April – 19:00 | Group stage | (Philippines) Global Cebu | Gianyar (H) | 1–3 | van der Velden | 2,154 | (Hong Kong) Lau Fong Hei |

== Player details ==
=== Appearances and goals ===
| No. | Pos | Nat | Player | Total | | Liga 1 | | Piala Indonesia | | AFC CL | | AFC Cup | |
| No. | Pos | Nat | Player | Apps | Goals | Apps | Goals | Apps | Goals | Apps | Goals | Apps | Goals |
|---|---|---|---|---|---|---|---|---|---|---|---|---|---|
| 2 | DF | (Indonesia) IDN | Novan Sasongko | 4 | 0 | 2+1 | 0 | 0+1 | 0 | 0 | 0 | 0 | 0 |
| 3 | MF | (Iraq) IRQ | Brwa Nouri | 13 | 0 | 10+3 | 0 | 0 | 0 | 0 | 0 | 0 | 0 |
| 4 | DF | (Indonesia) IDN | Syaiful Cahya | 10 | 0 | 4+5 | 0 | 1 | 0 | 0 | 0 | 0 | 0 |
| 5 | DF | (Indonesia) IDN | Dallen Doke | 9 | 1 | 7+1 | 1 | 1 | 0 | 0 | 0 | 0 | 0 |
| 6 | DF | (Indonesia) IDN | Junius R. Bate | 1 | 0 | 0 | 0 | 0+1 | 0 | 0 | 0 | 0 | 0 |
| 7 | MF | (Indonesia) IDN | Miftahul Hamdi | 9 | 0 | 0+6 | 0 | 0 | 0 | 0 | 0 | 0+3 | 0 |
| 8 | MF | (Indonesia) IDN | Muhammad Taufiq | 34 | 1 | 27 | 1 | 1 | 0 | 2 | 0 | 1+3 | 0 |
| 9 | FW | (Indonesia) IDN | Ilija Spasojević | 35 | 14 | 27+1 | 9 | 1 | 1 | 2 | 2 | 4 | 2 |
| 10 | FW | (Indonesia) IDN | Irfan Bachdim | 25 | 1 | 16+2 | 1 | 1 | 0 | 2 | 0 | 4 | 0 |
| 11 | MF | (Indonesia) IDN | Yabes Roni | 18 | 1 | 5+7 | 0 | 2 | 0 | 0+2 | 0 | 0+2 | 1 |
| 14 | MF | (Indonesia) IDN | Fadil Sausu (captain) | 32 | 5 | 18+6 | 3 | 1+1 | 1 | 2 | 1 | 4 | 0 |
| 15 | FW | (Indonesia) IDN | Yandi Munawar | 14 | 2 | 3+7 | 1 | 1 | 1 | 0 | 0 | 2+1 | 0 |
| 17 | MF | (Indonesia) IDN | I Nyoman Sukarja | 20 | 2 | 6+9 | 1 | 1 | 0 | 0 | 0 | 3+1 | 1 |
| 18 | MF | (Indonesia) IDN | I Kadek Agung Widnyana | 9 | 1 | 0+7 | 1 | 1+1 | 0 | 0 | 0 | 0 | 0 |
| 19 | FW | (Indonesia) IDN | Hanis Saghara Putra | 9 | 1 | 1+4 | 0 | 0+1 | 0 | 0+1 | 1 | 1+1 | 0 |
| 20 | MF | (Indonesia) IDN | Sutanto Tan | 10 | 0 | 2+5 | 0 | 1 | 0 | 0 | 0 | 2 | 0 |
| 21 | GK | (Indonesia) IDN | I Made Wardana | 4 | 0 | 2 | 0 | 0 | 0 | 0 | 0 | 2 | 0 |
| 22 | DF | (Indonesia) IDN | Dias Angga Putra | 17 | 1 | 12+2 | 1 | 1 | 0 | 0 | 0 | 2 | 0 |
| 23 | MF | (Netherlands) NED | Nick van der Velden | 31 | 2 | 22+2 | 1 | 0 | 0 | 2 | 0 | 4+1 | 1 |
| 24 | DF | (Indonesia) IDN | Ricky Fajrin | 31 | 0 | 24 | 0 | 1 | 0 | 2 | 0 | 4 | 0 |
| 26 | DF | (Mali) MLI | Mahamadou N'Diaye | 12 | 0 | 12 | 0 | 0 | 0 | 0 | 0 | 0 | 0 |
| 27 | DF | (Indonesia) IDN | Agus Nova Wiantara | 17 | 1 | 14 | 0 | 1 | 1 | 0 | 0 | 2 | 0 |
| 29 | MF | (Indonesia) IDN | Feby Eka Putra | 3 | 0 | 0+1 | 0 | 0 | 0 | 0 | 0 | 1+1 | 0 |
| 33 | DF | (Indonesia) IDN | I Made Andhika Wijaya | 31 | 1 | 21+2 | 1 | 1 | 0 | 2 | 0 | 5 | 0 |
| 34 | DF | (Brazil) BRA | Demerson | 19 | 1 | 11+1 | 0 | 0 | 0 | 2 | 0 | 5 | 1 |
| 44 | MF | (Indonesia) IDN | I Gede Sukadana | 17 | 1 | 7+5 | 0 | 1 | 0 | 0+1 | 0 | 3 | 1 |
| 48 | MF | (Indonesia) IDN | Ahmad Agung | 22 | 0 | 11+9 | 0 | 1 | 0 | 0 | 0 | 0+1 | 0 |
| 59 | GK | (Indonesia) IDN | Wawan Hendrawan | 36 | 0 | 30 | 0 | 1 | 0 | 2 | 0 | 3 | 0 |
| 62 | DF | (Indonesia) IDN | Taufik Hidayat | 19 | 0 | 17 | 0 | 1 | 0 | 0 | 0 | 1 | 0 |
| 87 | MF | (Indonesia) IDN | Stefano Lilipaly | 30 | 13 | 21+1 | 12 | 1 | 0 | 2 | 0 | 3+2 | 1 |
| 90 | FW | (Netherlands) NED | Melvin Platje | 18 | 10 | 17+1 | 10 | 0 | 0 | 0 | 0 | 0 | 0 |
| 95 | FW | (Indonesia) IDN | Martinus Novianto | 6 | 1 | 2+2 | 0 | 0+1 | 1 | 0 | 0 | 0+1 | 0 |
| 97 | GK | (Indonesia) IDN | Diky Indrayana | 4 | 0 | 2 | 0 | 1 | 0 | 0 | 0 | 1 | 0 |
Players transferred out during the season
| 26 | DF | (Indonesia) IDN | Ngurah Nanak | 1 | 0 | 0 | 0 | 0 | 0 | 0 | 0 | 1 | 0 |
| 32 | DF | (South Korea) KOR | Ahn Byung-keon | 21 | 0 | 14 | 0 | 0 | 0 | 2 | 0 | 4+1 | 0 |
| 61 | MF | (Montenegro) MNE | Miloš Krkotić | 9 | 0 | 8+1 | 0 | 0 | 0 | 0 | 0 | 0 | 0 |
| 77 | MF | (Netherlands) NED | Kevin Brands | 5 | 0 | 0 | 0 | 0 | 0 | 0+1 | 0 | 4 | 0 |

- Source: Match results
- Ordered by player's number.

=== Disciplinary record ===
| No. | Pos | Nat | Player | Total | | | Liga 1 | | | Piala Indonesia | | | AFC CL | | | AFC Cup | | |
| No. | Pos | Nat | Player | Yellow card | Second yellow card | Red card | Yellow card | Second yellow card | Red card | Yellow card | Second yellow card | Red card | Yellow card | Second yellow card | Red card | Yellow card | Second yellow card | Red card |
|---|---|---|---|---|---|---|---|---|---|---|---|---|---|---|---|---|---|---|
| 3 | MF | (Iraq) IRQ | Brwa Nouri | 1 | 0 | 0 | 1 | 0 | 0 | 0 | 0 | 0 | 0 | 0 | 0 | 0 | 0 | 0 |
| 4 | DF | (Indonesia) IDN | Syaiful Cahya | 1 | 0 | 0 | 0 | 0 | 0 | 1 | 0 | 0 | 0 | 0 | 0 | 0 | 0 | 0 |
| 5 | DF | (Indonesia) IDN | Dallen Doke | 4 | 0 | 0 | 4 | 0 | 0 | 0 | 0 | 0 | 0 | 0 | 0 | 0 | 0 | 0 |
| 8 | MF | (Indonesia) IDN | Muhammad Taufiq | 3 | 0 | 0 | 3 | 0 | 0 | 0 | 0 | 0 | 0 | 0 | 0 | 0 | 0 | 0 |
| 9 | FW | (Indonesia) IDN | Ilija Spasojević | 2 | 0 | 0 | 2 | 0 | 0 | 0 | 0 | 0 | 0 | 0 | 0 | 0 | 0 | 0 |
| 11 | MF | (Indonesia) IDN | Yabes Roni | 2 | 0 | 0 | 1 | 0 | 0 | 1 | 0 | 0 | 0 | 0 | 0 | 0 | 0 | 0 |
| 14 | MF | (Indonesia) IDN | Fadil Sausu | 1 | 0 | 0 | 1 | 0 | 0 | 0 | 0 | 0 | 0 | 0 | 0 | 0 | 0 | 0 |
| 17 | MF | (Indonesia) IDN | I Nyoman Sukarja | 1 | 0 | 0 | 0 | 0 | 0 | 1 | 0 | 0 | 0 | 0 | 0 | 0 | 0 | 0 |
| 20 | MF | (Indonesia) IDN | Sutanto Tan | 2 | 0 | 0 | 1 | 0 | 0 | 0 | 0 | 0 | 0 | 0 | 0 | 1 | 0 | 0 |
| 22 | DF | (Indonesia) IDN | Dias Angga Putra | 5 | 0 | 0 | 5 | 0 | 0 | 0 | 0 | 0 | 0 | 0 | 0 | 0 | 0 | 0 |
| 23 | MF | (Netherlands) NED | Nick van der Velden | 8 | 0 | 0 | 5 | 0 | 0 | 0 | 0 | 0 | 1 | 0 | 0 | 2 | 0 | 0 |
| 24 | DF | (Indonesia) IDN | Ricky Fajrin | 1 | 0 | 0 | 1 | 0 | 0 | 0 | 0 | 0 | 0 | 0 | 0 | 0 | 0 | 0 |
| 26 | DF | (Mali) MLI | Mahamadou N'Diaye | 1 | 2 | 0 | 1 | 2 | 0 | 0 | 0 | 0 | 0 | 0 | 0 | 0 | 0 | 0 |
| 27 | DF | (Indonesia) IDN | Agus Nova Wiantara | 0 | 1 | 1 | 0 | 1 | 1 | 0 | 0 | 0 | 0 | 0 | 0 | 0 | 0 | 0 |
| 33 | DF | (Indonesia) IDN | I Made Andhika Wijaya | 6 | 0 | 0 | 3 | 0 | 0 | 0 | 0 | 0 | 2 | 0 | 0 | 1 | 0 | 0 |
| 34 | DF | (Brazil) BRA | Demerson | 2 | 0 | 0 | 1 | 0 | 0 | 0 | 0 | 0 | 0 | 0 | 0 | 1 | 0 | 0 |
| 44 | MF | (Indonesia) IDN | I Gede Sukadana | 2 | 0 | 0 | 2 | 0 | 0 | 0 | 0 | 0 | 0 | 0 | 0 | 0 | 0 | 0 |
| 48 | MF | (Indonesia) IDN | Ahmad Agung | 3 | 0 | 0 | 2 | 0 | 0 | 1 | 0 | 0 | 0 | 0 | 0 | 0 | 0 | 0 |
| 59 | GK | (Indonesia) IDN | Wawan Hendrawan | 3 | 0 | 0 | 3 | 0 | 0 | 0 | 0 | 0 | 0 | 0 | 0 | 0 | 0 | 0 |
| 62 | DF | (Indonesia) IDN | Taufik Hidayat | 4 | 0 | 0 | 4 | 0 | 0 | 0 | 0 | 0 | 0 | 0 | 0 | 0 | 0 | 0 |
| 87 | MF | (Indonesia) IDN | Stefano Lilipaly | 2 | 0 | 0 | 2 | 0 | 0 | 0 | 0 | 0 | 0 | 0 | 0 | 0 | 0 | 0 |
| 90 | FW | (Netherlands) NED | Melvin Platje | 4 | 0 | 0 | 4 | 0 | 0 | 0 | 0 | 0 | 0 | 0 | 0 | 0 | 0 | 0 |
Players transferred out during the season
| 32 | DF | (South Korea) KOR | Ahn Byung-keon | 2 | 0 | 0 | 1 | 0 | 0 | 0 | 0 | 0 | 1 | 0 | 0 | 0 | 0 | 0 |

- Source: Match results
- Ordered by player's number.
- (yellow card) = Number of bookings; (second yellow card) = Number of sending offs after a second yellow card; (red card) = Number of sending offs by a direct red card.

== Transfers ==
=== Transfers in ===
| Date | Pos. | Name | From | Fee | Ref. |
|---|---|---|---|---|---|
| 1 January | MF | (Indonesia) Feby Eka Putra | Free agent (Note: Joined on 4 December 2017.) | Free transfer | |
| 1 January | FW | (Indonesia) Hanis Saghara Putra | Free agent | Free transfer | |
| 1 January | DF | (Brazil) Demerson | (Malaysia) Sarawak | Free transfer | |
| 1 January | MF | (Indonesia) Ahmad Agung | PSIS (Note: Joined on 11 December 2017.) | Free transfer | |
| 1 January | MF | (Indonesia) Sutanto Tan | Persija | Free transfer | |
| 1 January | FW | (Indonesia) Ilija Spasojević | Bhayangkara (Note: Joined on 13 December 2017.) | Free transfer | |
| 1 January | MF | (Netherlands) Kevin Brands | (Netherlands) Almere City (Note: Joined on 14 December 2017.) | Free transfer | |
| 1 January | DF | (Indonesia) Taufik Hidayat | PSIS (Note: Joined on 17 December 2017.) | Free transfer | |
| 18 January | MF | (Indonesia) I Kadek Agung Widnyana | Youth sector | Promoted | |
| 18 January | MF | (Indonesia) Arapenta Poerba | Youth sector | Promoted | |
| 9 March | DF | (Indonesia) Dallen Doke | Youth sector | Promoted | |
| 18 March | MF | (Montenegro) Miloš Krkotić | (Albania) Kukësi | Free transfer | |
| 23 April | GK | (Indonesia) Rakasurya Handika | Free agent | Free transfer | |
| 29 June | FW | (Netherlands) Melvin Platje | (Netherlands) Telstar | Free transfer | |
| 14 July | DF | (Indonesia) Novan Sasongko | Sriwijaya | Free transfer | |
| 14 July | DF | (Mali) Mahamadou N'Diaye | Sriwijaya | Free transfer | |
| 19 July | DF | (Indonesia) Syaiful Cahya | Arema | Free transfer | |
| 19 July | MF | (Iraq) Brwa Nouri | (Sweden) Östersunds | Free transfer | |

=== Transfers out ===
| Date | Pos. | Name | To | Fee | Ref. |
|---|---|---|---|---|---|
| 1 January | GK | (Indonesia) Alfonsius Kelvan | Persebaya (Note: Joined on 22 February.) | Free transfer | |
| 1 January | DF | (Indonesia) Abdul Rahman Sulaiman | PSM (Note: Joined on 3 January.) | Free transfer | |
| 1 January | MF | (Indonesia) Steven Imbiri | Perseru (Note: Joined on 24 February.) | Free transfer | |
| 1 January | MF | (Indonesia) Jackson Tiwu | Persika (Note: Joined on 17 January.) | Free transfer | |
| 1 January | DF | (Indonesia) Mahdi Fahri Albaar | PS TNI (Note: Joined on 30 December 2017.) | Free transfer | |
| 1 January | MF | (Indonesia) Samsul Pellu | Mojokerto Putra (Note: Joined on 22 February.) | Free transfer | |
| 1 January | DF | (Indonesia) Amrun Mubarok | Free agent | Released | |
| 1 January | MF | (Argentina) Marcos Flores | Free agent | Released | |
| 1 January | DF | (Indonesia) Hasyim Kipuw | PSM | Free transfer | |
| 1 January | MF | (Indonesia) Syakir Sulaiman | Aceh United (Note: Joined on 17 January.) | Free transfer | |
| 1 January | FW | (Netherlands) Sylvano Comvalius | (Thailand) Suphanburi (Note: Joined on 27 November 2017.) | Free transfer | |
| 1 January | FW | (Indonesia) I Made Wirahadi | PSS (Note: Joined on 15 February.) | Free transfer | |
| 18 March | MF | (Netherlands) Kevin Brands | Free agent | Released | |
| 3 April | DF | (Indonesia) Ngurah Nanak | Semen Padang | Free transfer | |
| 6 April | MF | (Indonesia) Azka Fauzi | Persis (Note: Joined on 20 April.) | Free transfer | |
| 5 July | MF | (Montenegro) Miloš Krkotić | Free agent | Released | |
| 1 November | DF | (South Korea) Ahn Byung-keon | Free agent | Released | |

=== Loans out ===
| Start date | Pos. | Name | To | End date | Ref. |
|---|---|---|---|---|---|
| 31 March | MF | (Indonesia) Arapenta Poerba | Bogor (Note: Until the end of Bogor's progress in Liga 2.) | End of season | |
| 31 March | DF | (Indonesia) Adi Parwa (Note: Back prematurely due to injury.) | Bogor | End of season | |
| 31 March | GK | (Indonesia) I Putu Pager Wirajaya | Bogor | End of season | |
