= 2016 Bali United F.C. season =

Indonesian football club season

Bali United
2016 season
- Chairman: Pieter Tanuri
- Manager: Indra Sjafri
- Stadium: Kapten I Wayan Dipta Stadium
- Soccer Championship A: 12th
- Top goalscorer: League: Nemanja Vidaković (7); All: Nemanja Vidaković (7)
- Highest home attendance: 21,175 (vs Persib, 18 September)
- Lowest home attendance: 1,566 (vs PSM, 6 December)
Home colours	Away colours	Third colours

The 2016 season was the second season of competitive association football played by Bali United Football Club, a professional football club based in Gianyar, Bali, Indonesia. This season, they competed in the Indonesia Soccer Championship A, a football tournament that replaced the temporarily suspended Indonesia Super League.

This season was the first time Bali United ended a full-competition season after 2015 Indonesia Super League was disbanded, having finished in 12th.

== Pre-season and friendlies ==
=== Friendlies ===
Friendlies match details
Date	Opponent	Venue	Result	Scorers
5 February – 19:30	PS TNI	Home	2–0	Sukarja, Loudry
14 February – 21:00	Persib	Away	0–3	
17 April – 16:00	PSM	Away	0–2	
18 April – 16:00	Persipura	Neutral	1–2	Martinus

=== Bali Island Cup ===
Bali Island Cup match details
Date	Round	Opponent	Venue	Result	Scorers
18 February – 14:30	Match 1	Arema Cronus	Home	1–3	Sukadana
21 February – 17:30	Match 2	Persib	Home	1–1	Antara
23 February – 14:30	Match 3	PSS	Home	1–1	Sukadana

=== Bhayangkara Cup ===
Bhayangkara Cup match details
Date	Round	Opponent	Venue	Result	Scorers
19 March – 21:00	Group stage	Arema Cronus	Home	1–2	Fadil
21 March – 15:30	Group stage	Persija	Home	1–2	Sukadana
25 March – 15:30	Group stage	Persipura	Home	1–0	Yabes
27 March – 18:00	Group stage	PS Polri	Home	1–0	Yabes
30 March – 18:00	Semi-finals	Persib	Away	0–1	
3 April – 18:00	Third place	Sriwijaya	Neutral	0–2	

=== Trofeo Persija ===
Trofeo Persija match details
Date	Round	Opponent	Venue	Result	Scorers
9 April – 18:00	Trofeo match 2	PSM	Neutral	2–0	Hamdi, Sukarja
9 April – 21:00	Trofeo match 3	Persija	Neutral	0–1	

=== Trofeo Bali Celebest ===
Trofeo Bali Celebest match details
Date	Round	Opponent	Venue	Result	Scorers
24 September – 19:00	Trofeo match 1	Perseden	Home	1–0	Heffernan
24 September – 21:30	Trofeo match 3	Celebest	Home	2–0	Sukadana, Heffernan

== Match results ==
=== Soccer Championship A ===
Pos	Team	Pld	W	D	L	GF	GA	GD	Pts
10	Mitra Kukar	34	13	10	11	47	43	+4	49
11	Perseru	34	13	7	14	38	51	−13	46
12	Bali United	34	10	10	14	36	52	−16	40
13	Persiba	34	9	8	17	38	52	−14	35
14	Persija	34	8	11	15	25	42	−17	35

Source: Liga Indonesia, Indonesia Soccer Championship
Rules for classification: 1) Points; 2) Head-to-head goal difference; 3) Goal difference; 4) Goals scored; 5) Draw.

Soccer Championship A match details
Date	Week	Opponent	Venue	Result	Scorers	Attendance	Referee	Position
1 May – 17:00	1	Pusamania Borneo	Home	1–1	Vidaković	7,230	Adi Riyanto	6
8 May – 17:00	2	Persipura	Away	0–0		12,364	Bahrul Ulum	8
14 May – 19:30	3	Persib	Away	0–2		18,572	Iwan Sukoco	14
21 May – 17:00	4	Semen Padang	Home	2–1	Ahn Byung-keon, Martinus	10,003	Nusur Fadilah	11
30 May – 20:00	5	Persiba	Away	1–3	Vidaković	3,271	Prasetyo Hadi	14
11 June – 22:00	6	Persela	Home	3–1	Insa, Fadil, Martinus	15,133	Aprisman Aranda	10
20 June – 22:30	7	Madura United	Away	0–0		1,135	Novari Ikhsan	12
27 June – 20:30	8	Perseru	Home	3–0	Wirahadi, Insa, Patinho	11,191	Mardi	8
3 July – 22:30	9	Bhayangkara	Away	1–3	Parwa	2,143	Thoriq Alkatiri	10
17 July – 16:00	10	Barito Putera	Away	1–0	Loudry	3,509	Jerry Elly	8
23 July – 17:00	11	Mitra Kukar	Home	1–1	Wirahadi	15,285	Djumadi Effendi	9
27 July – 20:00	12	PS TNI	Home	2–2	Wirahadi, Vidaković	14,578	Muslimin	7
1 August – 17:00	13	Persegres	Home	1–1	Fajrin	12,725	Maulana Nugraha	8
7 August – 20:00	14	Arema Cronus	Away	0–1		10,701	Fariq Hitaba	10
14 August – 17:00	15	PSM	Away	0–4		4,765	Hamsir	11
19 August – 17:00	16	Sriwijaya	Home	1–0	Fadil	8,574	Bahrul Ulum	10
26 August – 22:00	17	Persija	Away	2–1	Vidaković, Yabes	6,333	Yudi Nurcahya	8
3 September – 17:00	18	Persipura	Home	0–1		13,127	Yudi Prasojo	9
11 September – 17:00	19	Pusamania Borneo	Away	0–4		5,782	Adi Riyanto	12
18 September – 20:00	20	Persib	Home	1–0	Hamdi	21,175	Dafid Priatmoko	10
3 October – 17:00	21	Semen Padang	Away	0–3		3,272	Iwan Sukoco	11
9 October – 17:00	22	Persiba	Home	1–2	Fadil	12,176	Wendy Umar	12
13 October – 22:00	23	Persela	Away	0–3		935	Maulana Nugraha	12
18 October – 17:00	24	Madura United	Home	0–0		8,725	Adi Riyanto	12
22 October – 17:00	25	Perseru	Away	0–2		1,257	Iwan Sukoco	12
29 October – 17:00	26	Bhayangkara	Home	2–2	Wirahadi, Fadil	6,479	Moch. Adung	13
7 November – 20:00	27	Barito Putera	Home	3–2	Fadil, Syakir, Vidaković	4,366	Yeni Krisdianto	12
14 November – 17:00	28	Mitra Kukar	Away	1–3	Vidaković	1,284	Tabrani	12
20 November – 17:00	29	PS TNI	Away	4–2	Hamdi (4)	625	Satrio Bambang	12
25 November – 17:15	30	Persegres	Away	1–0	Sukadana	5,731	Dwi Susilo	12
3 December – 20:00	31	Arema Cronus	Home	2–2	Alsan, Fadil	15,127	Yudi Nurcahya	12
8 December – 15:00	32	PSM	Home	0–2		1,566	Asep Yandis	12
11 December – 17:00	33	Sriwijaya	Away	1–2	Wiantara	8,725	Kusni	12
18 December – 20:00	34	Persija	Home	1–1	Vidaković	3,780	Djumadi Effendi	12

== Player details ==
=== Appearances and goals ===
No.	Pos	Nat	Player	Total		Soccer Championship A	
No.	Pos	Nat	Player	Apps	Goals	Apps	Goals
1	GK	(Indonesia) IDN	Rully Desrian	20	0	20	0
4	DF	(Indonesia) IDN	Mahdi Fahri Albaar	10	0	9+1	0
6	DF	(Indonesia) IDN	Junius R. Bate	8	0	7+1	0
7	MF	(Indonesia) IDN	Miftahul Hamdi	22	5	22	5
8	DF	(Indonesia) IDN	Ricky Fajrin	30	1	30	1
9	MF	(Indonesia) IDN	Alsan Sanda	22	1	17+5	1
10	MF	(Indonesia) IDN	Loudry Setiawan	10	1	4+6	1
11	MF	(Indonesia) IDN	Yabes Roni	21	1	9+12	1
13	DF	(Indonesia) IDN	Bobby Satria	14	0	12+2	0
14	MF	(Indonesia) IDN	Fadil Sausu (captain)	30	6	29+1	6
15	MF	(Indonesia) IDN	Leo Guntara	2	0	0+2	0
17	MF	(Indonesia) IDN	I Nyoman Sukarja	9	0	7+2	0
18	FW	(Indonesia) IDN	I Made Wirahadi	24	4	14+10	4
19	MF	(Indonesia) IDN	Hendra Sandi	21	0	7+14	0
20	GK	(Indonesia) IDN	I Ngurah Komang Arya	2	0	2	0
22	DF	(Indonesia) IDN	I Komang Sujana	0	0	0	0
27	DF	(Indonesia) IDN	Agus Nova Wiantara	19	1	15+4	1
28	DF	(Indonesia) IDN	Abdul Rahman Sulaiman	10	0	9+1	0
29	MF	(Indonesia) IDN	Syeh Fadiel Abdriansyah	0	0	0	0
30	FW	(England) ENG	Daniel Heffernan	7	0	4+3	0
32	DF	(South Korea) KOR	Ahn Byung-keon	25	1	25	1
33	DF	(Indonesia) IDN	I Made Andhika Wijaya	0	0	0	0
37	MF	(Indonesia) IDN	Samsul Pellu	0	0	0	0
39	GK	(Indonesia) IDN	I Putu Pager Wirajaya	0	0	0	0
44	MF	(Indonesia) IDN	I Gede Sukadana	16	1	15+1	1
59	DF	(Indonesia) IDN	Hasyim Kipuw	27	0	25+2	0
86	MF	(Serbia) SRB	Zoran Knežević	6	0	6	0
88	DF	(Indonesia) IDN	Adi Parwa	14	1	7+7	1
90	MF	(Indonesia) IDN	Yulius Mauloko	4	0	2+2	0
92	MF	(Indonesia) IDN	Syakir Sulaiman	23	1	16+7	1
93	MF	(Indonesia) IDN	I Wayan Bayu Ariawan	0	0	0	0
95	FW	(Indonesia) IDN	Martinus Novianto	8	2	2+6	2
97	GK	(Indonesia) IDN	Diky Indrayana	12	0	12	0
99	FW	(Serbia) SRB	Nemanja Vidaković	27	7	23+4	7
Players transferred out during the season
69	MF	(Brazil) BRA	Lucas Patinho	7	1	7	1
87	DF	(Spain) ESP	Kiko Insa	9	2	6+3	2

- Source: Match results
- Ordered by player's number.

=== Disciplinary record ===
No.	Pos	Nat	Player	Total			Soccer Championship A		
No.	Pos	Nat	Player	Yellow card	Second yellow card	Red card	Yellow card	Second yellow card	Red card
1	GK	(Indonesia) IDN	Rully Desrian	1	0	0	1	0	0
4	DF	(Indonesia) IDN	Mahdi Fahri Albaar	3	0	0	3	0	0
6	DF	(Indonesia) IDN	Junius R. Bate	1	0	0	1	0	0
7	MF	(Indonesia) IDN	Miftahul Hamdi	1	0	0	1	0	0
8	DF	(Indonesia) IDN	Ricky Fajrin	1	0	0	1	0	0
9	MF	(Indonesia) IDN	Alsan Sanda	7	0	0	7	0	0
10	MF	(Indonesia) IDN	Loudry Setiawan	1	0	0	1	0	0
11	MF	(Indonesia) IDN	Yabes Roni	2	0	0	2	0	0
14	MF	(Indonesia) IDN	Fadil Sausu	2	0	0	2	0	0
15	MF	(Indonesia) IDN	Leo Guntara	1	0	0	1	0	0
17	MF	(Indonesia) IDN	I Nyoman Sukarja	1	0	0	1	0	0
18	FW	(Indonesia) IDN	I Made Wirahadi	6	0	0	6	0	0
19	MF	(Indonesia) IDN	Hendra Sandi	1	0	1	1	0	1
27	DF	(Indonesia) IDN	Agus Nova Wiantara	4	0	0	4	0	0
28	DF	(Indonesia) IDN	Abdul Rahman Sulaiman	2	0	0	2	0	0
32	DF	(South Korea) KOR	Ahn Byung-keon	3	0	0	3	0	0
44	MF	(Indonesia) IDN	I Gede Sukadana	6	0	0	6	0	0
59	DF	(Indonesia) IDN	Hasyim Kipuw	5	0	1	5	0	1
86	MF	(Serbia) SRB	Zoran Knežević	3	0	0	3	0	0
88	DF	(Indonesia) IDN	Adi Parwa	4	0	0	4	0	0
92	MF	(Indonesia) IDN	Syakir Sulaiman	3	0	0	3	0	0
95	FW	(Indonesia) IDN	Martinus Novianto	1	0	0	1	0	0
97	GK	(Indonesia) IDN	Diky Indrayana	2	0	0	2	0	0
99	FW	(Serbia) SRB	Nemanja Vidaković	6	0	0	6	0	0
Players transferred out during the season
69	MF	(Brazil) BRA	Lucas Patinho	3	0	0	3	0	0
87	DF	(Spain) ESP	Kiko Insa	4	0	0	4	0	0

- Source: Match results
- Ordered by player's number.
- (yellow card) = Number of bookings; (second yellow card) = Number of sending offs after a second yellow card; (red card) = Number of sending offs by a direct red card.

== Transfers ==
=== Transfers in ===
Date	Pos.	Name	From	Fee	Ref.
1 January 2016	GK	(Indonesia) I Putu Pager Wirajaya	Youth sector	Promoted	
1 January 2016	GK	(Indonesia) Diky Indrayana	Free agent	Free transfer	
1 January 2016	MF	(Indonesia) Alsan Sanda	Free agent	Free transfer	
1 January 2016	GK	(Indonesia) I Ngurah Komang Arya	Persiba	Free transfer	
1 January 2016	MF	(Indonesia) Miftahul Hamdi	Persiba	Free transfer	
1 January 2016	FW	(Indonesia) I Made Wirahadi	Persiba	Free transfer	
1 January 2016	DF	(Indonesia) Agus Nova Wiantara	Persegres	Free transfer	
1 January 2016	GK	(Indonesia) Rully Desrian	Semen Padang	Free transfer	
12 January 2016	MF	(Indonesia) Irfandy Zein	Free agent	Free transfer	
17 February 2016	MF	(Indonesia) I Gede Sukadana	Arema Cronus	Free transfer	
19 February 2016	MF	(Indonesia) Yulius Mauloko	Free agent	Free transfer	
20 February 2016	MF	(Indonesia) Syakir Sulaiman	Sriwijaya	Free transfer	
21 March 2016	MF	(Brazil) Lucas Patinho	(Brazil) Madureira	Free transfer	
26 April 2016	DF	(Indonesia) Hasyim Kipuw	Arema Cronus	Free transfer	
26 April 2016	DF	(Indonesia) Mahdi Fahri Albaar	Mitra Kukar	Free transfer	
28 April 2016	FW	(Serbia) Nemanja Vidaković	(Serbia) Beograd	Free transfer	
3 May 2016	DF	(South Korea) Ahn Byung-keon	Free agent	Free transfer	
28 July 2016	DF	(Indonesia) I Komang Sujana	Youth Sector	Youth contract	
28 July 2016	DF	(Indonesia) I Made Andhika Wijaya	Youth Sector	Youth contract	
28 July 2016	MF	(Indonesia) I Wayan Bayu Ariawan	Youth Sector	Youth contract	
28 July 2016	MF	(Indonesia) Samsul Pellu	Youth Sector	Youth contract	
28 July 2016	MF	(Indonesia) Syeh Fadiel Abdriansyah	Youth Sector	Youth contract	
9 August 2016	DF	(Indonesia) Abdul Rahman Sulaiman	(Timor-Leste) Karketu Dili	Free transfer	
21 August 2016	MF	(Serbia) Zoran Knežević	(Serbia) Jagodina	Free transfer	
21 August 2016	FW	(England) Daniel Heffernan	(Australia) Goulburn Valley Suns	Free transfer	
23 August 2016	MF	(Indonesia) Leo Guntara	Semen Padang	Free transfer	

=== Transfers out ===
Date	Pos.	Name	To	Fee	Ref.
1 January 2016	DF	(Indonesia) Syaeful Anwar	Free agent	Released	
1 January 2016	MF	(Indonesia) Bayu Gatra	Free agent	Released	
1 January 2016	FW	(Indonesia) Lerby Eliandry	Free agent	Released	
1 January 2016	DF	(Indonesia) I Nengah Sulendra	Free agent	Released	
1 January 2016	MF	(Indonesia) Iswandi Dai	Free agent	Released	
1 January 2016	MF	(Indonesia) Sutanto Tan	Free agent	Released	
1 January 2016	DF	(Indonesia) Wahyu Kristanto	Free agent	Released	
1 January 2016	FW	(Indonesia) Sukron Makmun	Free agent	Released	
21 April 2016	MF	(Indonesia) Irfandy Zein	PS TNI	Free transfer	
21 April 2016	DF	(Indonesia) Ganjar Mukti	PS TNI	Free transfer	
5 August 2016	MF	(Brazil) Lucas Patinho	Free agent	Released	

=== Loans in ===
Start date	Pos.	Name	From	End date	Ref.
22 January 2016	DF	(Indonesia) Putu Gede	Surabaya United (Note: Until end of Bali Island Cup 2016.)	25 February 2016	
22 January 2016	MF	(Indonesia) Ilham Armaiyn	Surabaya United	25 February 2016	
22 January 2016	MF	(Indonesia) Zulfiandi	Surabaya United	25 February 2016	
2 March 2016	DF	(Spain) Kiko Insa	Arema Cronus (Note: Loan terminated on 11 August 2016.)	End of season	
