= Komang =

Komang is an Indonesian name. Notable people with the name include:

- Komang Ayu Cahya Dewi (born 2002), Indonesian badminton player
- Komang Teguh (born 2002), Indonesian footballer
- Komang Tri (born 2001), Indonesian footballer
- I Komang Putra (born 1972), Indonesian footballer
- I Ngurah Komang Arya (born 1985), Indonesian footballer
