= Diky Indriyana =

Indonesian footballer

Personal information
- Full name: Mochammad Diky Indriyana
- Date of birth: 4 June 1997 (age 29)
- Place of birth: Ciamis, Indonesia
- Height: 1.80 m (5 ft 11 in)
- Position: Goalkeeper

Team information
- Current team: Madura United
- Number: 21

Youth career
- 2012–2014: PSGC Ciamis

Senior career*
Years	Team	Apps	(Gls)
2015–2019	Bali United	14	(0)
2017	→ Celebest (loan)	2	(0)
2020–2021	Borneo	0	(0)
2021–2024	Persikabo 1973	29	(0)
2024–2025	Semen Padang	8	(0)
2025–	Madura United	6	(0)

International career
2014	Indonesia U19	1	(0)
2017	Indonesia	1	(0)
- * Club domestic league appearances and goals as of 7 February 2026

Mochammad Diky Indriyana (born 4 June 1997) is an Indonesian professional footballer who plays as a goalkeeper for Super League club Madura United.

== Club career ==
=== Bali United ===
Bali United is Indriyana's first professional club. He was recruited in 2015 by then-coach Indra Sjafri along with his teammates Yabes Roni, Martinus Novianto, and Ricky Fajrin.

==== Celebest (loan) ====
He was signed for Celebest to play in the Liga 2 in the 2017 season, on loan from Bali United.

=== Borneo ===
In 2020, Indriyana signed a one-year contract with Indonesian Liga 1 club Borneo. This season was suspended on 27 March 2020 due to the COVID-19 pandemic. The season was abandoned and was declared void on 20 January 2021.

=== Persikabo 1973 ===
He was signed for Persikabo 1973 to play in Liga 1 in the 2021 season. Indriyana made his league debut on 3 December 2021 against Persija Jakarta at the Sultan Agung Stadium, Bantul.

== International career ==
Indriyana made his senior international debut on 21 March 2017, against Myanmar.

== Career statistics ==
=== Club ===
As of match played 7 February 2026

Club	Season	League			Cup (Note: Includes Piala Indonesia)		Continental (Note: Appearances in AFC Cup)		Other		Total	
Club	Season	Division	Apps	Goals	Apps	Goals	Apps	Goals	Apps	Goals	Apps	Goals
Bali United	2016	ISC A	12	0	0	0	0	0	0	0	12	0
Bali United	2017	Liga 1	0	0	0	0	0	0	0	0	0	0
Bali United	2018	Liga 1	2	0	1	0	1	0	0	0	4	0
Bali United	2019	Liga 1	0	0	0	0	0	0	0	0	0	0
Bali United	Total		14	0	1	0	1	0	0	0	16	0
Celebest (loan)	2017	Liga 2	2	0	0	0	0	0	0	0	2	0
Borneo	2020	Liga 1	0	0	0	0	0	0	0	0	0	0
Persikabo 1973	2021–22	Liga 1	9	0	0	0	0	0	0	0	9	0
Persikabo 1973	2022–23	Liga 1	15	0	0	0	–		2 (Note: Appearances in Indonesia President's Cup)	0	17	0
Persikabo 1973	2023–24	Liga 1	5	0	0	0	–		0	0	5	0
Persikabo 1973	Total		29	0	0	0	–		2	0	31	0
Semen Padang	2024–25	Liga 1	8	0	0	0	–		0	0	8	0
Madura United	2025–26	Super League	6	0	0	0	–		0	0	6	0
Career total			59	0	1	0	1	0	2	0	63	0

=== International ===
As of match played 11 June 2017

Appearances and goals by national team and year
National team	Year	Apps	Goals
Indonesia	2017	1	0
Total		1	0

== Honours ==
=== Club ===
Bali United

- Liga 1: 2019
