= Lucas Patinho =

Brazilian footballer (born 1992)

Personal information
- Full name: Lucas Garcia Benetão
- Date of birth: 6 March 1992 (age 34)
- Place of birth: Ribeirão Preto, Brazil
- Height: 1.83 m (6 ft 0 in)
- Position: Midfielder

Youth career
- 2004–2008: Atlético Paranaense
- 2008–2012: Fluminense

Senior career*
Years	Team	Apps	(Gls)
2012–	Fluminense	4	(0)
2012	→ Sporting B (loan)	2	(0)
2013	→ Hajduk Split (loan)	0	(0)
2013	→ Audax Rio (loan)	0	(0)
2014	→ Nacional-MG (loan)	4	(0)
2014	→ Ponte Preta (loan)	0	(0)
2014	→ Botafogo-SP (loan)	0	(0)
2014-2015	→ Alecrim FC (loan)	0	(0)
2015	→ CRAC (loan)	0	(0)
2015	→ Madureira (loan)	2	(0)
2016	→ Botafogo-PB (loan)	0	(0)
2016	Bali United	7	(1)

International career
2011	Brazil U20	2	(0)
- * Club domestic league appearances and goals

Lucas Garcia Benetão (born 6 March 1992 in Ribeirão Preto) is a Brazilian footballer who plays as a midfielder.

== Career ==
A product of Atlético Paranaense and Fluminense and a Brazilian youth national team player, Patinho made his Série A debut with Fluminense in June 2012, coming on for Manuel Lanzini. Patinho was then sent on loan to Portugal where he played in two matches for Sporting Lisbon's reserve side. His next loan was to Croatian side HNK Hajduk Split, in January 2013, but failed to score a cap before he was returned, with his teammate Cassio, in April, to Fluminense.

His next loan was in August 2013, when he joined Audax Rio on a loan. for the Copa Rio.

In 2014, Patinho went on a series of loans. In January he joined Nacional-MG. Ponte Preta was his next destination in April, but at the end of May, the player's loan was cancelled, without him participating in a single official match. His next station was Botafogo (SP), which he joined for the Copa Paulista in August

In late December 2014, Patinho was loaned to Alecrim FC, but his loan was terminated a month later due to the player's lack of dedication without featuring in a single match. In 2015, he would go on to two more loans, first to CRAC and then to Madureira, where he featured twice in Série C and three more times Copa Rio. His last loan would be in January 2016, when he joined Botafogo-PB, which wouldn't last long and Patinho's contract with Fluminense was annulled in March 2016.

The same month, Lucas Patinho signed for the Indonesian side Bali United taking the number 69. On June 27, Patinho scored his first and only senior-level goal, in a 3-0 win versus Badak Lampung. That would prove to be his last official match, as he was sidelined by injury. In August 2016 the club chose not to prolong Patinho's contract, stating that the shoulder injury Patinho had was hidden from them as the player came to the club and that it would need surgery in the future.
