= Dallen Doke =

Indonesian footballer

Personal information
- Full name: Dallen Ramadhan Rovani Doke
- Date of birth: 2 January 1998 (age 28)
- Place of birth: Jakarta, Indonesia
- Height: 1.76 m (5 ft 9 in)
- Position: Full-back

Youth career
- 2015: Persipasi Bandung Raya
- 2015: Torre Levante
- 2016–2017: Castellón
- 2017: → Alcúdia (loan)
- 2017: Bali United
- 2018: Racing Algemesí

Senior career*
Years	Team	Apps	(Gls)
2018–2019	Bali United	9	(1)
2020–2022	Persita Tangerang	3	(0)
2022	→ PSM Makassar (loan)	12	(0)
2022–2023	PSM Makassar	6	(0)
2023–2024	RANS Nusantara	19	(0)
Total		49	(1)
- * Club domestic league appearances and goals

Dallen Ramadhan Rovani Doke (born 2 January 1998) is a former Indonesian football player who last played for RANS Nusantara. Although he mainly plays as a full-back, he can also play as a centre-back.

== Club career ==
=== Bali United ===
On 9 March 2018, Dallen officially signed a two-year contract with Liga 1 club Bali United. He made his professional debut for Bali United in a 4–0 win against PS Sumbawa Barat in 2018 Piala Indonesia. And then made his professional debut in Liga 1 when Bali United got a 2–0 victory against PSM Makassar on 11 July 2018. On 2 December 2019, Bali United won the championship for the first time in their history, becoming the seventh club to win the Liga 1 after second placed Borneo draw to PSM, followed by a win in Semen Padang, giving Bali United a 17-point lead with only four games left.

=== Persita Tangerang ===
On 8 January 2020, Dallen officially signed a year contract with Liga 1 club Persita Tangerang. This season was suspended on 27 March 2020 due to the COVID-19 pandemic. The season was abandoned and was declared void on 20 January 2021.

==== PSM Makassar (loan) ====
In 2022, Dallen signed a contract with Indonesian Liga 1 club PSM Makassar, on loan from Persita Tangerang. He made his league debut on 8 January 2022 in a match against Madura United at the Ngurah Rai Stadium, Denpasar.

== Career statistics ==
=== Club ===
Club	Season	League			Cup		Continental		Other		Total	
Club	Season	Division	Apps	Goals	Apps	Goals	Apps	Goals	Apps	Goals	Apps	Goals
Bali United	2018	Liga 1	8	1	1 (Note: Includes Piala Indonesia)	0	0	0	0	0	9	1
Bali United	2019	Liga 1	1	0	0	0	0	0	0	0	1	0
Bali United	Total		9	1	1	0	0	0	0	0	10	1
Persita Tangerang	2020	Liga 1	0	0	0	0	0	0	0	0	0	0
Persita Tangerang	2021–22	Liga 1	3	0	0	0	0	0	0	0	3	0
PSM Makassar (loan)	2021–22	Liga 1	12	0	0	0	0	0	0	0	12	0
PSM Makassar	2022–23	Liga 1	6	0	0	0	1 (Note: Appearances in AFC Cup)	0	2 (Note: Appearances in Indonesia President's Cup)	0	9	0
RANS Nusantara	2023–24	Liga 1	19	0	0	0	0	0	0	0	19	0
Career total			49	1	1	0	1	0	2	0	53	1

== Honours ==
Bali United

- Liga 1: 2019

PSM Makassar

- Liga 1: 2022–23
