= I Made Wardana =

Indonesian footballer

Kadek Wardana
Personal information
- Full name: I Made Kadek Wardana
- Date of birth: 31 December 1981 (age 44)
- Place of birth: Ubud, Indonesia
- Height: 1.80 m (5 ft 11 in)
- Position: Goalkeeper

Senior career*
Years	Team	Apps	(Gls)
2000–2007	Persegi Gianyar	88	(0)
2007–2008	Persikab Bandung	5	(0)
2008–2012	Pelita Jaya	66	(1)
2012–2016	Arema Cronus	40	(0)
2016–2018	Bali United	19	(0)
Total		218	(1)
- * Club domestic league appearances and goals

I Made Kadek Wardana (born 31 December 1981 in Ubud, Bali) is an Indonesian former footballer who played as a goalkeeper.

== Honours ==
Arema Cronus

- East Java Governor Cup: 2013
- Menpora Cup: 2013
- Indonesian Inter Island Cup: 2014/15

Bali United

- Indonesia President's Cup runner-up: 2018
