= Rully Desrian =

Indonesian footballer

Personal information
- Full name: Rully Desrian
- Date of birth: 19 December 1996 (age 29)
- Place of birth: Padang, Indonesia
- Height: 1.75 m (5 ft 9 in)
- Position: Goalkeeper

Team information
- Current team: Nganjuk Ladang
- Number: 1

Youth career
- 2012–2014: Semen Padang

Senior career*
Years	Team	Apps	(Gls)
2015	Semen Padang	0	(0)
2016	Bali United	20	(0)
2017	Bhayangkara	4	(0)
2018	Aceh United	5	(0)
2018	Martapura	6	(0)
2019	Persatu Tuban	16	(0)
2021	Badak Lampung	1	(0)
2022	Perserang Serang	2	(0)
2025–	Nganjuk Ladang	4	(0)

International career^{‡}
2012	Indonesia U16	0	(0)
2013–2014	Indonesia U19	2	(0)
Medal record
Men's football
Representing Indonesia
AFF U-19 Youth Championship
Winner	2013 Indonesia
- * Club domestic league appearances and goals as of 23 January 2025 (UTC) ‡ National team caps and goals as of 31 May 2018

Rully Desrian (born in Padang, Indonesia, 19 December 1996) is an Indonesian professional footballer who plays as a goalkeeper for Liga 4 club Nganjuk Ladang. He was the part of Indonesia U19 that won 2013 AFF U-19 Youth Championship.

== Career ==
=== Semen Padang ===
He started his football career at Semen Padang, when he played mostly for Semen Padang FC U-21, with which he won the 2014 Indonesia Super League U-21. His good performances made him earn a spot in Indonesia U-19.

=== Bali United ===
In 2016, he joined Bali United to play in ISC A, Indonesian first-tier league at that time. He played in several big matches, i.e.: Semen Padang vs Bali United, in which he saved a penalty kick, PSM Makasar vs Bali United, and Bali United vs Persela. He made a clean sheet when Bali United played an away game with Madura United. However, he made a fatal mistake when Bali United draw 1–1 to Gresik United on August 1, 2016, which made manager Indra Sjafri lost his temper.

=== Bhayangkara F.C. ===
In 2017, he joined Bhayangkara F.C. to compete in 2017 Liga 1, and played in 4 matches. With Bhayangkara F.C., he won Liga 1 this season.

=== Aceh United ===
For 2018 season, he signed for newly promoted club Aceh United to compete in 2018 Liga 2. Until May 31, 2018, he has played in all Aceh United league games, and conceded 9 goals in 5 games.

== International career ==
He was the part of Indonesia U-17 and Indonesia U-19. With Indonesia U-17, he won HKFA International Youth Football Invitation Tournament 2012 and HKJC Cup 2013, both held in Hongkong.

With Indonesia U-19, he won 2013 AFF U-19 Youth Championship where he played in the semifinal game when Indonesia U-19 defeated Timor-Leste U-19 2–0, in which he came from the bench substituting injured Ravi Murdianto in minute 37. He was also called for 2014 AFC U-19 Championship. In this tournament, he played in the first Indonesia U-19 game losing 1–3 to Uzbekistan U-19. But he did not play for the next two games when Indonesia U-19 played Australia U-19 and UAE U-19.

== Personal life ==
Beside being a football player, he is also a member of Indonesian National Police.

== Honours ==
=== Club ===
Semen Padang U21

- Indonesia Super League U-21: 2014

Bhayangkara

- Liga 1: 2017

=== International ===
Indonesia U-16

- HKFA International Youth Invitation: 2012

Indonesia U-19

- HKFA International Youth Invitation: 2013
- AFF U-19 Youth Championship: 2013
