= Ngurah Nanak =

Indonesian association footballer

Personal information
- Full name: Anak Agung Ngurah Wahyu Trisnajaya
- Date of birth: 28 July 1988 (age 38)
- Place of birth: Denpasar, Indonesia
- Height: 1.80 m (5 ft 11 in)
- Position: Centre-back

Senior career*
Years	Team	Apps	(Gls)
2008–2009	Persitara	12	(0)
2009–2010	Sriwijaya	4	(0)
2010–2014	Persija	52	(2)
2015–2016	Sriwijaya	20	(0)
2017–2018	Bali United	9	(0)
2018	Semen Padang	28	(1)
2019	PSIM Yogyakarta	2	(0)
2019–2021	Persiba Balikpapan	19	(0)
2022	Persela Lamongan	1	(0)

International career^{‡}
2011	Indonesia U23		(0)
- * Club domestic league appearances and goals as of 15:19, 4 September 2022 (UTC) ‡ National team caps and goals as of 25 October 2011

Anak Agung Ngurah Wahyu Trisnajaya (born 28 July 1988) better known as Ngurah Nanak, is an Indonesian professional footballer who plays as a centre-back.

== Club career ==
On 30 November 2014, he was signed again by Sriwijaya.

== Honours ==
=== Club ===
Sriwijaya

- Piala Indonesia: 2010

Semen Padang

- Liga 2 runner-up: 2018
