= Nick van der Velden =

Dutch footballer (born 1981)

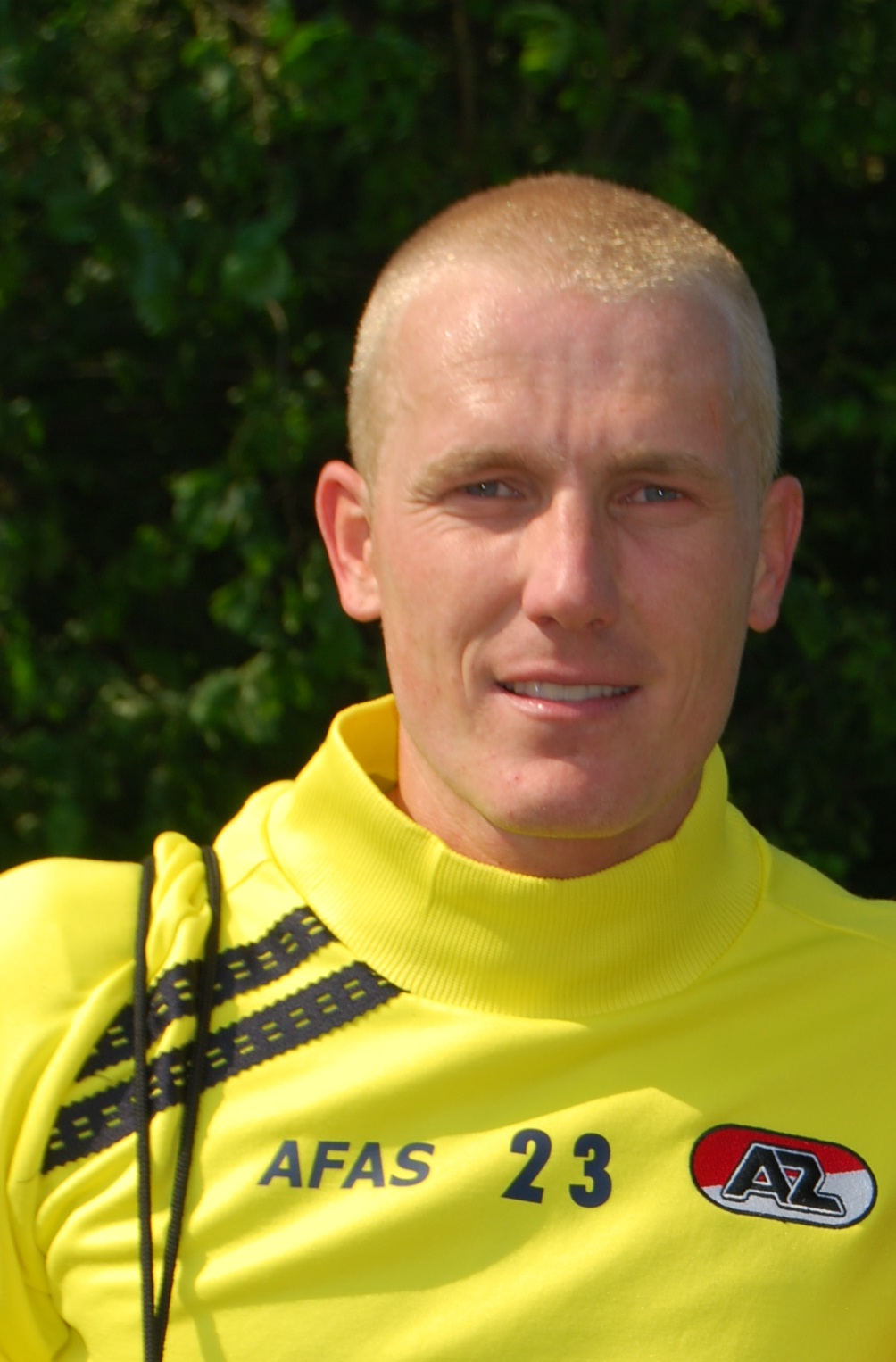
- Van der Velden in 2011

Personal information
- Date of birth: 16 December 1981 (age 44)
- Place of birth: Amsterdam, Netherlands
- Height: 1.88 m (6 ft 2 in)
- Position: Midfielder

Youth career
- De Volewijckers
- DWS
- Ajax

Senior career*
| Years | Team | Apps | (Gls) |
| 2003–2005 | RKC Waalwijk | 13 | (4) |
| 2005–2006 | Dordrecht | 32 | (9) |
| 2006–2007 | RKC Waalwijk | 6 | (2) |
| 2007–2008 | Dordrecht | 42 | (16) |
| 2008–2011 | AZ | 35 | (12) |
| 2011–2013 | NEC | 50 | (17) |
| 2013–2015 | FC Groningen | 42 | (7) |
| 2015–2016 | Willem II | 25 | (3) |
| 2016–2017 | Dundee United | 31 | (8) |
| 2017–2018 | Bali United | 51 | (6) |
| 2019–2020 | AFC | 13 | (1) |
| Total | | 327 | (94) |

Managerial career
- 2019–: AZ U17
- * Club domestic league appearances and goals

Nick van der Velden (born 16 December 1981) is a Dutch former professional footballer. A midfielder, he played for FC Dordrecht, RKC Waalwijk, AZ Alkmaar, NEC, FC Groningen, Willem II, Dundee United, Bali United, and Amsterdamsche FC.

== Playing career ==
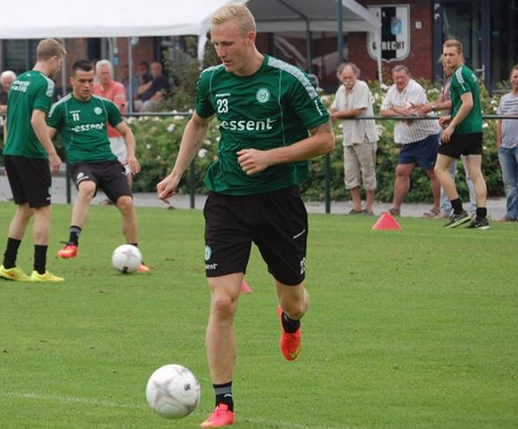
Van der Velden playing for FC Groningen in 2014

Van der Velden started his senior career at RKC Waalwijk before moving to Dordrecht. He would return to Waalwijk and return again to Dordrecht.

In 2008 he joined AZ, which was coached by Champions League-winning manager Louis van Gaal. Alongside Dutch national side members like Stijn Schaars and Demy de Zeeuw as well as foreign internationals, Ragnar Klavan, Sébastien Pocognoli, and Sergio Romero for instance, they won the 2008–09 Eredivisie and qualified for the 2009–10 UEFA Champions League group stage and the 2009 Johan Cruyff Shield. They won the Shield but finished bottom of Group H in the Champions League, prompting the new manager Ronald Koeman to be sacked and replaced by Dick Advocaat. AZ finished fifth and qualified for the 2010–11 UEFA Europa League.

Van der Velden moved to NEC in 2011 before moving to FC Groningen two years later. He won the 2014–15 KNVB Cup in his final season there. He then moved to Willem II before went abroad to Scottish club Dundee United. He helped Dundee United win the Scottish Challenge Cup a month before being released on 25 April 2017. He later joined Indonesian club Bali United, helping the club finish second in the 2017 Liga 1, controversially losing only on head-to-head to police-owned Bhayangkara F.C. As the champions failed to obtain the AFC license, Bali qualified for the 2018 AFC Champions League qualifying play-offs.

== Honours ==
AZ Alkmaar

- Eredivisie: 2008–09
- Johan Cruyff Shield: 2009

Groningen

- KNVB Cup: 2014–15

Dundee United

- Scottish Challenge Cup: 2016–17

Bali United

- Indonesia President's Cup runner-up: 2018
