= Hans-Peter Schaller =

Austrian football manager (born 1962)

Peter Schaller
Personal information
- Full name: Hans-Peter Schaller
- Date of birth: 5 September 1962 (age 64)
- Place of birth: Austria

Managerial career
- Years: Team
- 1991–1992: LUV Graz
- 1993: Wiener Sportklub
- 1994–1995: Oberwart
- 1996: Grazer AK
- 1998–1999: TSV Hartberg
- 2000–2006: Kapfenberg
- 2011: Laos
- 2012: Persiba Balikpapan
- 2015: PSM Makassar
- 2017: Bali United

Hans-Peter Schaller (born 5 September 1962) is an Austrian professional football manager.
