= Steven Imbiri =

Indonesian footballer

Personal information
- Full name: Steven Anderson Imbiri
- Date of birth: April 30, 1987 (age 39)
- Place of birth: Kaimana, Indonesia
- Height: 1.70 m (5 ft 7 in)
- Position: Winger

Senior career*
Years	Team	Apps	(Gls)
2008−2010	Persewon Wondama	33	(6)
2010−2011	PSIM Yogyakarta	23	(3)
2011−2012	PSIS Semarang	20	(3)
2012−2013	Persiba Bantul	16	(0)
2013−2015	Persiram Raja Ampat	43	(3)
2016−2017	Persela Lamongan	22	(5)
2017	MISC-MIFA	13	(0)
2017	PS TNI	2	(0)
2017	Bali United	1	(0)
2018	Perseru Serui	2	(0)
Total		175	(20)

International career^{‡}
2014	Indonesia	2	(0)
- * Club domestic league appearances and goals as of January 24, 2017 ‡ National team caps and goals as of January 24, 2017

Steven Anderson Imbiri (born April 30, 1987) is an Indonesian former footballer.
