= Nemanja Vidaković =

Serbian footballer

Personal information
- Full name: Немања Видаковић
- Date of birth: 29 September 1985 (age 41)
- Place of birth: Belgrade, SFR Yugoslavia
- Height: 1.83 m (6 ft 0 in)
- Position: Forward

Youth career
- Mladi Obilić

Senior career*
| Years | Team | Apps | (Gls) |
| 2003–2005 | Dorćol | 42 | (11) |
| 2005–2006 | Obilić | 4 | (0) |
| 2006–2007 | Pandurii Târgu Jiu | 0 | (0) |
| 2007–2008 | → CSM Râmnicu Vâlcea (loan) | 25 | (12) |
| 2008–2009 | Gaz Metan Mediaș | 14 | (1) |
| 2010 | Dunajská Streda | 6 | (0) |
| 2010–2011 | Borac Banja Luka | 24 | (6) |
| 2012 | Rəvan Bakı | 27 | (7) |
| 2013 | Novi Pazar | 27 | (5) |
| 2014 | Napredak Kruševac | 13 | (2) |
| 2014 | Novi Pazar | 8 | (1) |
| 2015 | Sime Darby | 10 | (5) |
| 2016 | OFK Beograd | 5 | (0) |
| 2016 | Bali United | 28 | (7) |
| 2017 | Napredak Kruševac | 2 | (0) |
| Total | | 244 | (57) |

International career
- Serbia U19
- Serbia U21
- * Club domestic league appearances and goals

Nemanja Vidaković (Serbian Cyrillic: Немања Видаковић; born 29 September 1985) is a Serbian former footballer.

== Career ==
He began his career at FK Obilić in 2005. After the 2005-06 season he was transferred to the Romanian side Pandurii Târgu-Jiu, but he only spent one season there. Then he was loaned to CSM Râmnicu Vâlcea (Romania's Liga II) for one year. In June 2008 he signed a three-year contract with the newly promoted Gaz Metan Mediaș. In 2017 he played for Napredak Kruševac.

== Honours ==
Borac Banja Luka

- Premier League of Bosnia and Herzegovina (1): 2010–11
