= Azka Fauzi =

Indonesian footballer

Personal information
- Full name: Ikhwan Azka Fauzi Wibowo
- Date of birth: 4 February 1996 (age 30)
- Place of birth: Bandung, Indonesia
- Height: 1.73 m (5 ft 8 in)
- Positions: Winger; forward

Team information
- Current team: Persibo Bojonegoro
- Number: 20

Youth career
- 2014–2016: Bali United

Senior career*
Years	Team	Apps	(Gls)
2016	Persatu Tuban	6	(2)
2017	Bali United	8	(0)
2017	→ Celebest (loan)	6	(1)
2018	Persis Solo	16	(5)
2018	Persiraja Banda Aceh	5	(3)
2019	Persita Tangerang	0	(0)
2020	PSMS Medan	1	(0)
2021	Persis Solo	0	(0)
2021	→ PSM Makassar (loan)	10	(1)
2022	Persikab Bandung	5	(0)
2023–2024	Persikota Tangerang	5	(0)
2024–	Persibo Bojonegoro	8	(0)
- * Club domestic league appearances and goals as of 17:10, 12 December 2025 (UTC)

Ikhwan Azka Fauzi Wibowo (born 4 February 1996), commonly known as Azka Fauzi, is an Indonesian professional footballer who plays for Persibo Bojonegoro. Mainly a winger, he can also play as a forward.

== Club career ==
=== Bali United ===
Fauzi made his professional debut in a 2–1 home loss to Persipura Jayapura. He replaced Irfan Bachdim after 74 minutes.
