= Dias Angga Putra =

Indonesian footballer (born 1989)

Dias Angga
Personal information
- Full name: Dias Angga Putra
- Date of birth: 6 May 1989 (age 37)
- Place of birth: Bandung, Indonesia
- Height: 1.68 m (5 ft 6 in)
- Position: Right-back

Team information
- Current team: RANS Nusantara
- Number: 22

Youth career
- 2006−2011: Persib Bandung

Senior career*
| Years | Team | Apps | (Gls) |
| 2010−2011 | Persib Bandung | 2 | (0) |
| 2011−2013 | Putra Samarinda | 46 | (0) |
| 2013−2014 | Pelita Bandung Raya | 26 | (1) |
| 2015−2016 | Persib Bandung | 16 | (0) |
| 2017−2022 | Bali United | 63 | (1) |
| 2022−2023 | Dewa United | 30 | (0) |
| 2023–2024 | PSIM Yogyakarta | 17 | (0) |
| 2024–2025 | PSKC Cimahi | 22 | (0) |
| 2025–2026 | Bekasi City | 20 | (0) |
| 2026– | RANS Nusantara | 1 | (0) |

International career
| 2008 | Indonesia U21 | 0 | (0) |
| 2011 | Indonesia U23 | 3 | (0) |
- * Club domestic league appearances and goals as of 22:35, 13 September 2026 (UTC)

Dias Angga Putra (born 6 May 1989) is an Indonesian professional footballer who plays as a right-back for Championship club RANS Nusantara.

== Personal life ==
In November 2014, Dias got married. His mother is from Ternate, Maluku.

== Club career ==
He signed a two-year contract with Pelita Bandung Raya on 26 November 2013. In November 2014, he signed again with Persib Bandung.

== Honours ==
Persib Bandung U-21

- Indonesia Super League U-21: 2009–10

Persib Bandung

- Indonesia President's Cup: 2015

Bali United

- Liga 1: 2019, 2021–22
- Indonesia President's Cup runner-up: 2018
