= I Nyoman Sukarja =

Indonesian footballer

Personal information
- Full name: I Nyoman Sukarja
- Date of birth: 17 August 1989 (age 37)
- Place of birth: Badung, Indonesia
- Height: 1.73 m (5 ft 8 in)
- Position: Right winger

Senior career*
Years	Team	Apps	(Gls)
2010–2011	Bali Devata	16	(2)
2011–2012	Persija Jakarta (IPL)	22	(3)
2012–2013	PSIS Semarang	14	(2)
2013–2014	PS Badung	0	(0)
2015–2019	Bali United	29	(2)
2021	Sulut United	5	(0)
2022	PSKC Cimahi	6	(4)
2023–2024	PSIM Yogyakarta	16	(4)
2024	PSKC Cimahi	6	(0)
2024–2025	Persekat Tegal	3	(0)
2025–2026	Perseden Denpasar	13	(3)
- * Club domestic league appearances and goals as of 25 January 2026

I Nyoman Sukarja (born 17 August 1989 in Denpasar) is an Indonesian professional footballer who plays as a right winger.

== Club career ==
=== Sulut United ===
In 2021, Nyoman Sukarja signed a contract with Indonesian Liga 2 club Sulut United. He made his league debut on 28 October 2021 in a match against Kalteng Putra at the Tuah Pahoe Stadium, Palangkaraya.
