= Agus Nova =

Indonesian footballer

Personal information
- Full name: Agus Nova Wiantara
- Date of birth: 29 November 1992 (age 33)
- Place of birth: Tabanan, Indonesia
- Height: 1.83 m (6 ft 0 in)
- Position: Centre-back

Team information
- Current team: PSIS Semarang
- Number: 4

Youth career
- SSB Putra Pegok

Senior career*
Years	Team	Apps	(Gls)
2010–2012	Bali Devata	18	(0)
2012–2014	Pro Duta	41	(2)
2015	Persegres Gresik United	16	(0)
2016–2021	Bali United	58	(1)
2021–2022	Persis Solo	0	(0)
2021	→ Mitra Kukar (loan)	3	(0)
2022	Semen Padang	6	(0)
2023	RANS Nusantara	8	(1)
2023–2024	Semen Padang	18	(1)
2024–2025	PSKC Cimahi	17	(1)
2025–2026	Garudayaksa	19	(1)
2026–	PSIS Semarang	0	(0)

International career
2012	Indonesia U21	6	(0)
2012	Indonesia U23	4	(0)
- * Club domestic league appearances and goals as of 9 May 2026

Agus Nova Wiantara (born 29 November 1992 in Tabanan) is an Indonesian professional footballer who plays as a centre-back for Championship club PSIS Semarang.

== International career ==
Agus called up to Indonesia under-21 team and played in 2012 Hassanal Bolkiah Trophy, but failed to win after losing 0-2 from Brunei under-21 team.

== Honours ==
=== Club ===
Bali United

- Indonesia President's Cup runner-up: 2018

Semen Padang

- Liga 2 runner-up: 2023–24

Garudayaksa

- Championship: 2025–26

=== International ===
Indonesia U-21

- Hassanal Bolkiah Trophy runner-up: 2012
