= I Ngurah Komang Arya =

Indonesian footballer

Komang Arya
Personal information
- Full name: I Ngurah Komang Arya
- Date of birth: 14 October 1985 (age 41)
- Place of birth: Bali, Indonesia
- Height: 1.79 m (5 ft 10 1/2 in)
- Position: Goalkeeper

Senior career*
Years	Team	Apps	(Gls)
2011−2012	Arema FC	4	(0)
2013−2014	PSM Makassar	3	(0)
2014−2015	Persiba Balikpapan	5	(0)
2015–2016	Bali United	2	(0)
2019	Martapura	3	(0)
Total		17	(0)
- * Club domestic league appearances and goals

I Ngurah Komang Arya (born 14 October 1985 in Bali) is an Indonesian former footballer who plays as a goalkeeper.
