= Samsul Pelu =

Indonesian association footballer

Personal information
- Full name: Samsul Muhidin Pelu
- Date of birth: 21 September 1995 (age 31)
- Place of birth: Tulehu, Indonesia
- Height: 1.68 m (5 ft 6 in)
- Position: Midfielder

Youth career
- 2012: Persemalra Maluku Tenggara
- 2013–2014: Jember United
- 2014–2015: Perseden Denpasar
- 2016: Bali United

Senior career*
Years	Team	Apps	(Gls)
2016–2017	Bali United	4	(0)
2017	→ Persikad Depok (loan)	6	(0)
2018–2019	PS Mojokerto Putra	28	(0)
2019	Bandung United	22	(0)
2020	Martapura	1	(0)
2021–2022	Sleman United	7	(0)
2023	Persab Brebes	1	(0)
- * Club domestic league appearances and goals

Samsul Muhidin Pelu (born 21 September 1995) is an Indonesian professional footballer who plays as a midfielder.

== Club career ==
=== Bali United ===
He made his debut in the Liga 1 on April 16, 2017, against Madura United.

==== Persikad Depok (loan) ====
He was signed for Persikad Depok to play in the Liga 2 in the 2017 season, on loan from Bali United.

=== PS Mojokerto Putra ===
In 2018, Samsul Pelu signed a contract with Indonesian Liga 2 club PS Mojokerto Putra.

=== Bandung United ===
In 2019, Pelu signed a one-year contract with Bandung United.

=== Martapura ===
In 2020, Pelu signed a contract with Indonesian Liga 2 club Martapura.
