= Junius Bate =

Indonesian association footballer

Personal information
- Full name: Felisianus Junius Rato Bate
- Date of birth: 9 June 1993 (age 33)
- Place of birth: Buleleng, Indonesia
- Height: 1.70 m (5 ft 7 in)
- Position: Full-back

Team information
- Current team: Perseden Denpasar
- Number: 25

Senior career*
Years	Team	Apps	(Gls)
2012–2014	Persiwa Wamena	8	(0)
2015–2019	Bali United	12	(0)
2017	→ Celebest (loan)	2	(0)
2019	→ PSS Sleman (loan)	2	(0)
2019	PSIM Yogyakarta	3	(0)
2020	Kalteng Putra	1	(0)
2021–2022	PSM Makassar	0	(0)
2021	→ Persiba Balikpapan (loan)	5	(0)
2022	Persela Lamongan	2	(0)
2025–2026	PSD Demak	4	(0)
2026–	Perseden Denpasar	0	(0)

International career^{‡}
2023	Indonesia (beach soccer)	3	(2)
- * Club domestic league appearances and goals as of 1 October 2022 ‡ National team caps and goals as of 21 March 2023

Felisianus Junius Rato Bate (born 9 June 1993), simply known as Junius Bate, is an Indonesian professional footballer who plays as a full-back for Liga Nusantara club Perseden Denpasar.

== Club career ==
=== Kalteng Putra ===
He was signed for Kalteng Putra to play in Liga 2 in the 2020 season. This season was suspended on 27 March 2020 due to the COVID-19 pandemic. The season was abandoned and was declared void on 20 January 2021.

=== PSM Makassar ===
In June 2021, Junius confirmed his transfer to PSM Makassar.

==== Persiba Balikpapan (loan) ====
In 2021, Junius signed a contract with Indonesian Liga 2 club Persiba Balikpapan, on loan from PSM Makassar in the 2021 season. He made his league debut on 20 October against Persewar Waropen at the Tuah Pahoe Stadium, Palangka Raya.
