= Mahdi Fahri Albaar =

Indonesian association footballer

Mahdi Albaar
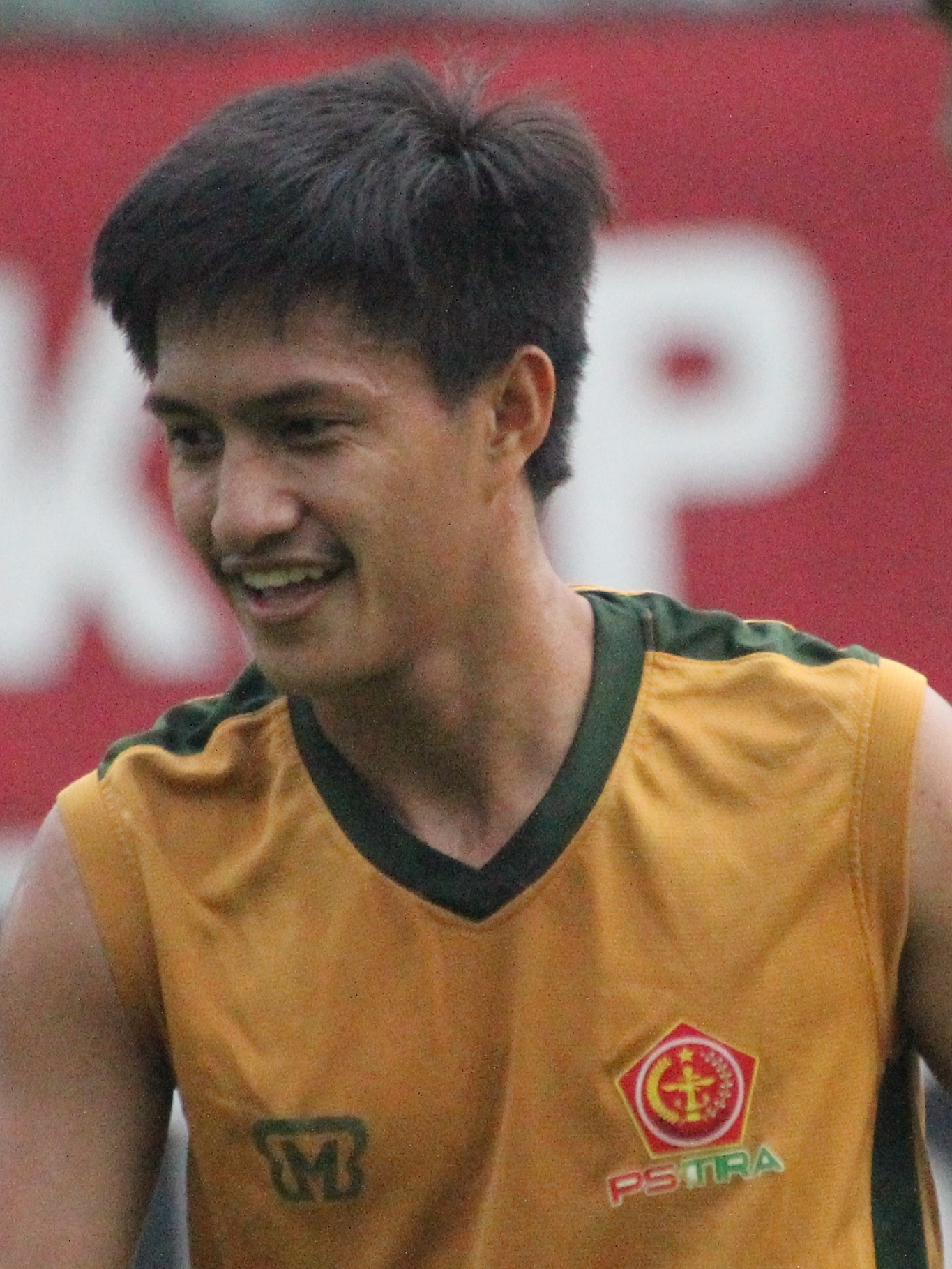
- Mahdi Albaar with TIRA-Persikabo in 2019

Personal information
- Full name: Mahdi Fahri Albaar
- Date of birth: 27 September 1995 (age 31)
- Place of birth: Ternate, Indonesia
- Height: 1.72 m (5 ft 8 in)
- Position: Right-back

Youth career
- 2009: SSB Tunas Gamalama
- 2011–2013: Deportivo Indonesia

Senior career*
Years	Team	Apps	(Gls)
2010–2011	Persiter Ternate	15	(0)
2014–2015	Mitra Kukar	0	(0)
2016–2017	Bali United	17	(0)
2017	→ Celebest (loan)	2	(0)
2018–2020	Persikabo 1973	18	(0)
2019–2020	→ Sulut United (loan)	15	(0)
2021	Sulut United	11	(1)
2022	PSS Sleman	4	(0)
2023–2024	Nusantara United	13	(0)
2024–2025	Adhyaksa	17	(0)

International career^{‡}
2013–2014	Indonesia U19	6	(0)
Medal record
Men's football
Representing Indonesia
AFF U-19 Youth Championship
Winner	2013 Indonesia
- * Club domestic league appearances and goals as of 10 February 2025 ‡ National team caps and goals as of 18 March 2016

Mahdi Fahri Albaar (born 27 September 1995) is an Indonesian professional footballer who plays as a right-back.

== Club career ==
=== Persiter Ternate ===
When he was a teenager, Mahdi has already played for senior team of Persiter Ternate and before eventually, he went to Uruguay to joined with Deportivo Indonesia

=== Mitra Kukar ===
In 2015, Mahdi joined Mitra Kukar F.C. with his colleagues in the Indonesia U-19, namely Ryuji Utomo, Dinan Javier, Ravi Murdianto and Septian David Maulana

=== Bali United ===
In 2016, Mahdi joined Bali United F.C. in 2016 Indonesia Soccer Championship A

==== Celebest (loan) ====
He was signed for Celebest to play in the Liga 2 in the 2017 season, on loan from Bali United.

== International career ==
In 2013, he was called U-19 team in the 2013 AFF U-19 Youth Championship, he took the team to win the AFF U-19 Youth Championship for the first time.

== Honours ==
=== International ===
Indonesia U19

- AFF U-19 Youth Championship: 2013
