= I Made Wirahadi =

Indonesian association footballer

Personal information
- Full name: I Made Adi Wirahadi
- Date of birth: 24 April 1983 (age 43)
- Place of birth: Denpasar, Indonesia
- Height: 1.80 m (5 ft 11 in)
- Position: Striker

Youth career
- 1994: SSB Perseden

Senior career*
| Years | Team | Apps | (Gls) |
| 2004–2005 | Perseden Denpasar | 11 | (6) |
| 2005–2007 | Persekaba Badung | 36 | (14) |
| 2008–2009 | Persita Tangerang | 30 | (6) |
| 2009–2010 | Pelita Jaya | 19 | (0) |
| 2010–2011 | Persebaya 1927 | 17 | (6) |
| 2011–2012 | Persijap Jepara | 22 | (5) |
| 2013 | Persiba Bantul | 18 | (7) |
| 2014–2015 | Perseru Serui | 9 | (1) |
| 2015–2016 | Persiba Balikpapan | 1 | (0) |
| 2016–2017 | Bali United | 28 | (4) |
| 2017 | → PSMS Medan (loan) | 9 | (5) |
| 2018 | PSS Sleman | 9 | (1) |
| 2018 | Kalteng Putra | 9 | (2) |
| 2019–2021 | Bhayangkara | 2 | (0) |
| 2020–2021 | → Sulut United (loan) | 8 | (0) |
| 2022–2023 | PSDS Deli Serdang | 5 | (0) |
- * Club domestic league appearances and goals

I Made Adi Wirahadi (born 24 April 1983) is an Indonesian former footballer who plays as a striker. He is also a First Police Brigadier in the Indonesian National Police.

== Club career ==
=== Bhayangkara ===
Wirahadi was signed for Bhayangkara to play in Liga 1 in the 2019 season. He made his debut on 26 July 2019 as a substitute in a match against Arema at the Kanjuruhan Stadium, Malang.

=== Sulut United ===
He was signed for Sulut United to play in Liga 2 in the 2020 season. This season was suspended on 27 March 2020 due to the COVID-19 pandemic. The season was abandoned and was declared void on 20 January 2021.

== Honours ==
=== Club ===
Persebaya Surabaya

- Liga Primer Indonesia: 2011

PSMS Medan

- Liga 2 runner-up: 2017

Kalteng Putra

- Liga 2 third place (play-offs): 2018
