= Syakir Sulaiman =

Indonesian footballer

Personal information
- Full name: Syakir Sulaiman
- Date of birth: 30 September 1992 (age 34)
- Place of birth: North Aceh, Indonesia
- Height: 1.70 m (5 ft 7 in)
- Position: Attacking midfielder

Senior career*
Years	Team	Apps	(Gls)
2010–2011	PSSB Bireuen	21	(3)
2011–2012	Persiraja Banda Aceh	16	(2)
2012–2013	Persiba Balikpapan	28	(9)
2014–2015	Sriwijaya	14	(3)
2016–2017	Bali United	36	(1)
2018–2019	Aceh United	9	(8)
Total		124	(26)

International career
2013–2014	Indonesia U23	6	(0)
- * Club domestic league appearances and goals

Syakir Sulaiman (born 30 September 1992) is an Indonesian former footballer who plays as an attacking midfielder.

== Club career ==
After some spells on several Indonesian Super League and Liga 1 clubs, he signed for the newly promoted club Aceh United for 2018 Liga 2 season. On 13 May 2018 he scored a hattrick when Aceh United played an away game versus Persita Tangerang.

== International career ==
In 2014, Syakir Sulaiman represented the Indonesia U-23, in the 2014 Asian Games.

== Honours ==
Individual

- Indonesia Super League Young Player of the Year: 2013
