= Ahn Byung-keon =

South Korean footballer

Ahn Byung-Keon
Personal information
- Full name: Ahn Byung-Keon
- Date of birth: 8 December 1988 (age 37)
- Place of birth: Seoul, South Korea
- Height: 1.90 m (6 ft 3 in)
- Position: Centre-back

Senior career*
Years	Team	Apps	(Gls)
2011–2013	Daejeon Korail	33	(2)
2013–2014	Pattaya United	8	(0)
2014	Songkhla United	22	(5)
2015	Bangkok	27	(3)
2016–2018	Bali United	62	(3)
2019	Jeonnam Dragons	3	(0)
2020	Saigon	20	(2)
2021	Binh Dinh	12	(0)
2022	Saigon	5	(0)
2022	Tainan City	6	(0)
Total		198	(15)
- * Club domestic league appearances and goals

Ahn Byung-Keon (Korean: 안병건; born 8 December 1988) is a South Korean former footballer who plays as a centre-back.

== Honours ==
Bali United

- Indonesia President's Cup runner-up: 2018
