= Miftahul Hamdi =

Indonesian footballer (born 1995)

Personal information
- Full name: Miftahul Hamdi
- Date of birth: 13 December 1995 (age 30)
- Place of birth: Banda Aceh, Indonesia
- Height: 1.77 m (5 ft 10 in)
- Position: Winger

Team information
- Current team: PSIS Semarang
- Number: 11

Youth career
- 2012: PPLD Aceh

Senior career*
| Years | Team | Apps | (Gls) |
| 2013–2014 | Persiraja Banda Aceh | 10 | (2) |
| 2015 | Persiba Balikpapan | 2 | (0) |
| 2016–2020 | Bali United | 55 | (7) |
| 2020–2021 | Persiraja Banda Aceh | 3 | (0) |
| 2021–2022 | Persis Solo | 15 | (2) |
| 2022 | → Persita Tangerang (loan) | 15 | (0) |
| 2022–2023 | PSS Sleman | 7 | (0) |
| 2023–2024 | Persik Kediri | 18 | (1) |
| 2024–2026 | Persiraja Banda Aceh | 35 | (10) |
| 2026 | Adhyaksa | 12 | (3) |
| 2026– | PSIS Semarang | 7 | (1) |

International career
| 2017 | Indonesia | 1 | (0) |
- * Club domestic league appearances and goals as of 21 November 2026

Miftahul Hamdi (born 13 December 1995) is an Indonesian professional footballer who plays as a winger for Championship club PSIS Semarang.

== Club career ==
=== Bali United ===
Hamdi joined in the Bali United squad for 2016 Indonesia Soccer Championship A. Hamdi contracted 1 years by the club management.

In a match against PS TNI, Hamdi scored a Quat-trick, with this result, Bali United win over PS TNI, 4-2 for Bali United, Hamdi became a second player to score quat-trick in 2016 Indonesia Soccer Championship A. Previously, Sriwijaya striker, Alberto Goncalves did the same thing when Sriwijaya against PS TNI, then, Sriwijaya FC won 6–1 in Palembang.

=== Persiraja Banda Aceh ===
After several misunderstandings between Bali United and Persiraja regarding Miftahul Hamdi's transfer and status, it was finally confirmed that he will play for Persiraja for 2020 season. This season was suspended on 27 March 2020 due to the COVID-19 pandemic. The season was abandoned and was declared void on 20 January 2021.

=== Persis Solo ===
In 2021, Hamdi signed a contract with Indonesian Liga 2 club Persis Solo. He was transferred from 2019 Liga 1 champion, Bali United. Hamdi made his first 2021–22 Liga 2 debut on 26 September 2021, coming on as a starter in a 2–0 win against PSG Pati at the Manahan Stadium, Surakarta.

==== Persita Tangerang (loan) ====
He was signed for Persita Tangerang to play in the Liga 1, on loan from Persis Solo. Hamdi made his league debut on 7 January 2022 in a match against Persib Bandung at the Ngurah Rai Stadium, Denpasar.

=== PSS Sleman ===
Hamdi was signed for PSS Sleman to play in Liga 1 in the 2022–23 season. He made his league debut on 19 August 2022 in a match against Persib Bandung at the Maguwoharjo Stadium, Sleman.

=== Persik Kediri ===
On 29 January 2023, Hamdi signed a contract with Liga 1 club Persik Kediri from PSS Sleman. Hamdi made his league debut for the club in a 1–2 lose against PSIS Semarang.

== International career ==
He made his international debut for senior team on 8 June 2017, against Cambodia.

== Personal life ==
He is a graduate of Yogyakarta State University (UNY), the Faculty of Sports Science with a concentration in sports coaching education.

== Honours ==
=== Club ===
Bali United

- Liga 1: 2019
- Indonesia President's Cup runner-up: 2018

Persis Solo

- Liga 2: 2021

=== International ===
Indonesia

- Aceh World Solidarity Cup runner-up: 2017

=== Individual ===
- Liga 2 Best XI: 2021
