= Adi Parwa =

Indonesian association footballer

Personal information
- Full name: I Nyoman Adi Parwa
- Date of birth: 4 May 1994 (age 32)
- Place of birth: Jimbaran, Indonesia
- Height: 1.79 m (5 ft 10 in)
- Position: Defender

Team information
- Current team: Persekabpas Pasuruan
- Number: 87

Youth career
- 2003: SSB Putra Perkanthi Jimbaran
- 2009: Villa 2000
- 2010: Perseden Denpasar
- 2012: PS Badung
- 2013: Persib Bandung

Senior career*
Years	Team	Apps	(Gls)
2014	PS Badung	3	(0)
2015–2019	Bali United	14	(1)
2017	→ Persikad Depok (loan)	14	(0)
2017	→ Celebest (loan)	11	(0)
2019	→ Sulut United (loan)	8	(1)
2019–2021	Sulut United	1	(0)
2021	Badak Lampung	5	(0)
2022–2023	PSDS Deli Serdang	0	(0)
2023–2024	Kartanegara	0	(0)
2024–	Persekabpas Pasuruan	10	(0)
- * Club domestic league appearances and goals as of 21 February 2025

I Nyoman Adi Parwa (born 4 May 1994) is an Indonesian professional footballer who plays as a defender for Liga Nusantara club Persekabpas Pasuruan.

== Club career ==
=== Sulut United ===
He was signed for Sulut United to play in Liga 2 in the 2020 season. This season was suspended on 27 March 2020 due to the COVID-19 pandemic. The season was abandoned and was declared void on 20 January 2021.

=== Badak Lampung ===
In 2021, Adi Parwa signed a contract with Indonesian Liga 2 club Badak Lampung. He made his league debut on 4 October against PSKC Cimahi at the Gelora Bung Karno Madya Stadium, Jakarta.
