= Abdul Rahman Sulaiman =

Malaysian politician and journalist (1946–2022)

Yang Berbahagia Tan Sri Abdul Rahman Sulaiman PSM PJN
- عبدالرحمن سليمان

10th Chairman of BERNAMA
- In office 1 February 2010 – 31 January 2016
- Preceded by: Mohd Annuar Zaini
- Succeeded by: Azman Ujang

Member of the Malaysian Parliament for Parit Buntar
- In office 1995–1999
- Preceded by: Abdul Rahman Suliman (UMNO–BN)
- Succeeded by: Hasan Mohamed Ali (PAS)

Personal details
- Born: 26 May 1946 Parit Buntar, Perak, Malayan Union
- Died: 30 January 2022 (aged 75) Kuala Lumpur, Malaysia
- Resting place: Kampung Melaka Muslim Cemetery, Cheras, Kuala Lumpur, Malaysia
- Party: United Malays National Organisation (UMNO)
- Other political affiliations: Barisan Nasional (BN)
- Spouse: Puan Sri Maznah Adam
- Children: 3
- Occupation: Politician, Journalist

Abdul Rahman bin Sulaiman (26 May 1946 – 30 January 2022) was a Malaysian politician and journalist. He died in Kuala Lumpur on 30 January 2022, at the age of 75.

== Election results ==
Parliament of Malaysia
Year	Constituency	Candidate	Votes	Pct	Opponent(s)	Votes	Pct	Ballots cast	Majority	Turnout
1995	P054 Parit Buntar	Abdul Rahman Sulaiman (UMNO)	17,180	59.42%	Idris Abdul Rauf (S46)	11,731	40.58%	30,123	5,449	70.95%

== Honours ==
- Malaysia
  - Commander of the Order of Meritorious Service (PJN) – Datuk (2007)
  - Commander of the Order of Loyalty to the Crown of Malaysia (PSM) – Tan Sri (2016)
