= Fadil Sausu =

Indonesian footballer

Personal information
- Full name: Fadil Sausu
- Date of birth: 19 April 1985 (age 41)
- Place of birth: Palu, Indonesia
- Height: 1.75 m (5 ft 9 in)
- Position: Central midfielder

Team information
- Current team: Persibo Bojonegoro
- Number: 14

Youth career
- 2006: Persisam
- 2007–2008: PON East Kalimantan

Senior career*
Years	Team	Apps	(Gls)
2007–2008	PSTK Tarakan	6	(2)
2008–2009	Persik Kediri	15	(1)
2009–2011	Bontang	48	(5)
2011–2013	Mitra Kukar	37	(1)
2014–2024	Bali United	141	(16)
2024–2025	Gresik United	17	(0)
2025–	Persibo Bojonegoro	10	(1)

International career
2017	Indonesia	1	(0)
- * Club domestic league appearances and goals as of 21:34, 11 January 2026 (UTC)

Fadil Sausu (born 19 April 1985) is an Indonesian professional footballer who plays as a central midfielder for Liga Nusantara club Persibo Bojonegoro. He started his debut when joined junior club Persisam Putra Samarinda in 2006.

== Club career ==
Fadil was recruited by Persik Kediri to play in the 2008–09 Indonesia Super League.

After a season with Persik Kediri, Fadil was called by Fachry Husaini to joined Bontang FC. He joined Bontang FC for 2 seasons before moving to Mitra Kukar.

== International career ==
He made his international debut for senior team on 4 October 2017, against Cambodia.

Indonesia national team
Year	Apps	Goals
2017	1	0
Total	1	0

== Honours ==
Bali United

- Liga 1: 2019, 2021–22
- Indonesia President's Cup runner-up: 2018

Individual

- Liga 1 Team of the Season: 2019
- Indonesian Soccer Awards: Best Footballer 2019
- Indonesian Soccer Awards: Best 11 2019
