= I Gede Sukadana =

Indonesian footballer (born 1987)

Personal information
- Full name: I Gede Sukadana Pratama
- Date of birth: 18 October 1987 (age 39)
- Place of birth: Denpasar, Indonesia
- Height: 1.69 m (5 ft 7 in)
- Position: Midfielder

Team information
- Current team: Persiba Balikpapan
- Number: 44

Youth career
- 2005–2007: Perseden Denpasar

Senior career*
Years	Team	Apps	(Gls)
2007–2008	Persekabpas Pasuruan	20	(3)
2008–2012	Persela Lamongan	88	(2)
2012–2015	Arema Cronus	44	(2)
2015–2018	Bali United	49	(2)
2019	Kalteng Putra	26	(2)
2020–2021	PSS Sleman	0	(0)
2021	PSMS Medan	3	(0)
2021	PSG Pati	5	(0)
2022–2024	Gresik United	12	(2)
2024–	Persiba Balikpapan	12	(0)

International career^{‡}
2015–2017	Indonesia	3	(0)
- * Club domestic league appearances and goals as of 27 February 2025 ‡ National team caps and goals as of 25 March 2015

I Gede Sukadana Pratama (born 18 October 1987) is an Indonesian professional footballer who plays as a midfielder for Liga Nusantara club Persiba Balikpapan.

== International career ==
He made his debut with Indonesia on 25 March 2015 in a friendly against Cameroon.

== Honours ==
=== Club ===
Persela Lamongan

- Piala Gubernur Jatim (2): 2009, 2010

Arema Cronus

- Piala Gubernur Jatim: 2013
- Menpora Cup: 2013
- Indonesian Inter Island Cup: 2014/15

Bali United

- Indonesia President's Cup runner-up: 2018

Persiba Balikpapan

- Liga Nusantara Promotion play-offs: 2024–25
