= Martinus Novianto =

Indonesian footballer

Personal information
- Full name: Martinus Novianto Ardhi
- Date of birth: 4 November 1995 (age 31)
- Place of birth: Gunungkidul, Indonesia
- Height: 1.76 m (5 ft 9 in)
- Position: Striker

Team information
- Current team: Deltras
- Number: 18

Youth career
- 2014: PSIM Yogyakarta

Senior career*
| Years | Team | Apps | (Gls) |
| 2014–2019 | Bali United | 14 | (2) |
| 2016–2017 | → Persikad Depok (loan) | 14 | (4) |
| 2017 | → Celebest (loan) | 3 | (1) |
| 2019 | → Sulut United (loan) | 15 | (4) |
| 2020 | PSIM Yogyakarta | 0 | (0) |
| 2021–2024 | Deltras | 26 | (10) |
| 2025– | Deltras | 10 | (1) |

International career^{‡}
| 2013–2014 | Indonesia U19 | 3 | (1) |
| 2014 | Indonesia U21 | 2 | (0) |
- * Club domestic league appearances and goals as of 23:53, 13 September 2026 (UTC) ‡ National team caps and goals as of 23:53, 9 September 2014 (UTC)

Martinus Novianto Ardhi (born 4 November 1995) is an Indonesian professional footballer who plays as a striker for Deltras.

== Club career ==
On 13 January 2015, Martinus signed a one-year contract with Bali United to commence ahead of the 2015 Indonesia Super League. He made his debut on 4 April 2015, as starting line-up, which ended 2–1 defeat against Perseru Serui.

== International career ==
Martinus has represented Indonesia from under-19 to under-21 level.

== Personal life ==
He is a graduate of Yogyakarta State University (UNY), the Faculty of Sports Science with a concentration in sports coaching education.

== Career statistics ==
=== Club ===
As of 13 September 2026

Club statistics
| Club | Season | League | | | Piala Indonesia | | AFC Cup | | Other | | Total | |
| Club | Season | Division | Apps | Goals | Apps | Goals | Apps | Goals | Apps | Goals | Apps | Goals |
|---|---|---|---|---|---|---|---|---|---|---|---|---|
| Bali United | 2015 | Indonesia Super League | 2 | 0 | 0 | 0 | — | | | | 2 | 0 |
| Bali United | 2016 | ISC A | 8 | 2 | 0 | 0 | — | | | | 8 | 2 |
| Bali United | 2018 | Liga 1 | 4 | 0 | 1 | 1 | 1 | 0 | — | | 6 | 1 |
| Bali United | Total | | 14 | 2 | 1 | 1 | 1 | 0 | — | | 16 | 3 |
| Persikad Depok (loan) | 2017 | Liga 2 | 14 | 4 | 0 | 0 | — | | | | 14 | 4 |
| Celebest (loan) | 2017 | Liga 2 | 3 | 1 | 0 | 0 | — | | | | 3 | 1 |
| Sulut United | 2019 | Liga 2 | 15 | 4 | 0 | 0 | — | | | | 15 | 4 |
| PSIM Yogyakarta | 2020 | Liga 2 | 0 | 0 | 0 | 0 | — | | | | 0 | 0 |
| Deltras | 2021 | Liga 3 | 16 | 9 | 0 | 0 | — | | | | 16 | 9 |
| Deltras | 2022 | Liga 2 | 6 | 1 | 0 | 0 | — | | | | 6 | 1 |
| Deltras | 2025–26 | Championship | 9 | 1 | 0 | 0 | — | | | | 9 | 1 |
| Deltras | 2026–27 | Championship | 1 | 0 | 0 | 0 | — | | | | 1 | 0 |
| Career total | | | 78 | 22 | 1 | 1 | 1 | 0 | — | | 80 | 23 |
