= Ricky Fajrin =

Indonesian footballer (born 1995)

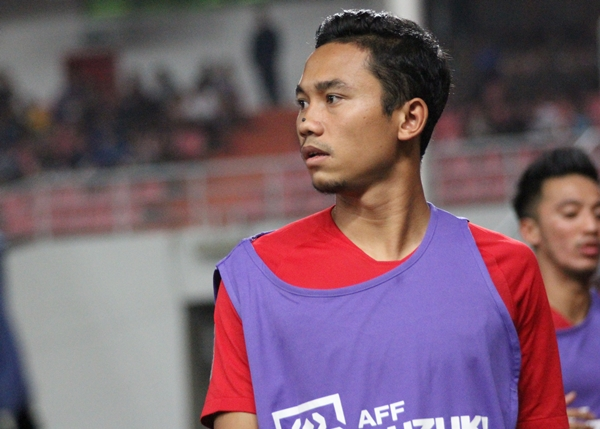
- Fajrin with Indonesia at the 2018 AFF Championship

Personal information
- Full name: Ricky Fajrin Saputra
- Date of birth: 6 September 1995 (age 31)
- Place of birth: Semarang, Indonesia
- Height: 1.76 m (5 ft 9 in)
- Positions: Left-back; centre-back

Team information
- Current team: Bali United
- Number: 24

Youth career
- 2005–2011: Tugu Muda Semarang
- 2012–2014: Berlian Rajawali

Senior career*
Years	Team	Apps	(Gls)
2015–	Bali United	262	(6)

International career
2013–2014	Indonesia U19	2	(0)
2017–2018	Indonesia U23	13	(1)
2017–2019	Indonesia	13	(0)
Medal record
Men's football
Representing Indonesia
Southeast Asian Games
Bronze medal – third place	2017 Kuala Lumpur	Team
- * Club domestic league appearances and goals as of 22 November 2026

Ricky Fajrin Saputra (born 6 September 1995) is an Indonesian professional footballer who plays as a defender for Super League club Bali United.

== Club career ==
Ricky started his career by joining Berlian Rajawali in Liga Nusantara. On 13 January 2015, he signed a contract with Bali United to commence ahead of the 2015 Indonesia Super League. He made his debut on 4 April 2015, as starting line-up, which ended 2–1 defeat against Perseru Serui.

== International career ==
Ricky has represented Indonesia under-19 in 2014 AFC U-19 Championship.

He made his international debut for senior team on 21 March 2017, against Myanmar.

== Career statistics ==
=== Club ===
As of match played 22 May 2026

Club	Season	League		Cup (Note: Includes Piala Indonesia)		League Cup		Continental (Note: Appearances in AFC Cup) (Note: Appearances in AFC Champions League)		Other		Total	
Club	Season	Apps	Goals	Apps	Goals	Apps	Goals	Apps	Goals	Apps	Goals	Apps	Goals
Bali United	2015	2	0	0	0			0	0	0	0	2	0
Bali United	2016	31	1	0	0			0	0	0	0	31	1
Bali United	2017	18	0	0	0			0	0	0	0	18	0
Bali United	2018	24	0	1	0			6	0	0	0	31	0
Bali United	2019	21	2	5	0			0	0	0	0	26	2
Bali United	2020	3	0	0	0			5	0	0	0	8	0
Bali United	2021–22	31	2	0	0			0	0	0	0	31	2
Bali United	2022–23	33	0	0	0			3	0	0	0	38	0
Bali United	2023–24	32	1	0	0			4	0	0	0	36	1
Bali United	2024–25	27	0	0	0			0	0	0	0	27	0
Bali United	2025–26	31	0	0	0			–		0	0	31	0
Bali United	2026–27	9	0	0	0	1	0	–		0	0	10	0
Career total		262	6	6	0	1	0	18	0	0	0	289	6

=== International ===
As of match played 19 November 2019

Appearances and goals by national team and year
National team	Year	Apps	Goals
Indonesia	2017	3	0
Indonesia	2018	4	0
Indonesia	2019	6	0
Total		13	0

=== International goals ===
International under-23 goals

Goal	Date	Venue	Opponent	Score	Result	Competition
1	17 August 2018	Patriot Candrabhaga Stadium, Bekasi, Indonesia	Laos	3–0	3–0	2018 Asian Games

== Honours ==
Bali United

- Liga 1: 2019, 2021–22
- Indonesia President's Cup runner-up: 2018

Indonesia U-23

- SEA Games bronze medal: 2017

Indonesia

- Aceh World Solidarity Cup runner-up: 2017

Individual

- Liga 1 Team of the Season: 2019 (Substitutes), 2023–24
- APPI Indonesian Football Award Best 11: 2021–22, 2023–2024
