= 2020 Bali United F.C. season =

Indonesian football club season

Bali United
2020 season
- Chairman: Pieter Tanuri
- Head coach: Stefano Cugurra
- Stadium: Kapten I Wayan Dipta Stadium
- Liga 1: Did not finish
- Piala Indonesia: Cancelled
- AFC Champions League: Preliminary round 2
- AFC Cup: Did not finish
- ASEAN Club Championship: Cancelled
- Top goalscorer: League: Melvin Platje (2); All: Melvin Platje (6)
- Highest home attendance: 8,223 (vs Madura United, 15 March)
- Lowest home attendance: 5,750 (vs Than Quảng Ninh, 11 February)
Home colours	Away colours	Third colours

The 2020 season was the sixth season of competitive association football and fifth season in the Liga 1 played by Bali United Football Club, a professional football club based in Gianyar, Bali, Indonesia. Their 1st-place finish in 2019 mean it was their fifth successive season in Liga 1.

Coming into the season, Bali United were the reigning Liga 1 champions. They also qualified for the AFC Champions League preliminary round 1 and ASEAN Club Championship group stage. This season was Bali United's second with head coach Stefano Cugurra. But Emral Abus served as a head coach in the AFC Champions League because there was a slight problem with Stefano Cugurra's coaching license which makes it administratively unable to be registered as a head coach. The same case also happen in AFC Cup where Eko Purjianto was registered as head coach.

They unable to finished all of this season competition (except for AFC Champions league which they finished in preliminary round 2) because all competition this season was cancelled due to the COVID-19 pandemic.

== Background ==
The 2019 season was Stefano Cugurra's first full season as head coach of Bali United, having taken charge in January 2019. The team went on a 12-match unbeaten run from July until September. This saw Bali United became the champions of 2019 Liga 1 with four matches left. Bali United were beaten 2–2 on away goals aggregate by Persija in the quarter-finals of 2018–19 Piala Indonesia.

== Pre-season and friendlies ==
=== Friendlies ===
Friendlies match details
Date	Opponent	Venue	Result	Scorers
1 February – 16:30	Persela	Home	1–0	Fadil
2 February – 16:30	Persela	Home	2–0	Widnyana, Rahmat

== Review and events ==
=== January–March ===
Bali United started their new season with preliminary round 1 of the AFC Champions League by playing away to Jalan Besar Stadium, Singapore to face 2019 Singapore Cup winners, Tampines Rovers. Playing on artificial turf, Melvin Platje gave Bali United an early lead with two goals inside 15 minute. Tampines Rovers pull one back with a goal before half time. Tampines Rovers evened the score in the 53rd minute and took the lead in the 68th minute by an own goal from their new signing, Rahmat. Rahmat paid for his mistake with an equalizing goal in the 81st minute and the match continues to extra time. Stefano Lilipaly and the other new signing Sidik Saimima ensured a 5–3 win and Bali United through to preliminary round 2. They once again failed to reach the group stage as they were destroyed by four-time A-League champions, Melbourne Victory five goals without reply at AAMI Park which resulted them to played in AFC Cup.

Once again Bali United were drawn into Group G. Ceres–Negros (Philippines), Svay Rieng (Cambodia), and Than Quảng Ninh (Vietnam) joined the group. The team opened their AFC Cup campaign with a win against 10-men Than Quảng Ninh after falling behind 0–1 in the first half. Rahmat and Platje started their comeback in just five minutes into the second half. Ilija Spasojević scored from a penalty before Platje sealed the game 4–1. They failed to continue their momentum as they lose to Svay Rieng. Once again played in artificial turf, they conceded two goals inside the 20th minute before Spasojević scored the only goals for the team.

They were held to a stalemate against Persita in the first match of March and Liga 1. A trip to the Demang Lehman Stadium to face Barito Putera five days after ended in a 2–1 win; the goals, scored by Lilipaly in the first half and the returning Lerby Eliandry in the second half. Losing three key players really affected the game of Bali United which made them lose 4–0 to Ceres–Negros in the continuation of the AFC Cup group stage. They bounce back with a 3–1 win against Madura United in the league. Platje scored two goals and Paulo Sérgio scored two assists plus a controversially disallowed goal from Spasojević marked their performance after back from injuries.

== Match results ==
=== Liga 1 ===
Pos	Team	Pld	W	D	L	GF	GA	GD	Pts	Qualification or relegation
1	Persib	3	3	0	0	7	2	+5	9	
2	Bali United	3	2	1	0	5	2	+3	7	Qualification for the 2021 AFC Cup group stage (Note: Bali United qualified for the 2021 AFC Cup group stage as the 2019 Liga 1 champions.)
3	Borneo	3	2	0	1	6	4	+2	6	
4	Persipura	3	2	0	1	6	5	+1	6	Qualification for the 2021 AFC Cup play-off round (Note: Persipura qualified for the 2021 AFC Cup play-off round as the 2019 Liga 1 third place.)
5	PSIS	3	2	0	1	5	4	+1	6	

Source: Shopee Liga 1 2020, Soccerway
Rules for classification: 1) Points; 2) Head-to-head; 3) Goal difference; 4) Goals scored; 5) Drawing.
Notes:

Liga 1 match details
Date	Week	Opponent	Venue	Result	Scorers	Attendance	Referee	Position
1 March – 21:40	1	Persita	Home	0–0		6,551	Asep Yandis	9
6 March – 19:30	2	Barito Putera	Away	2–1	Lilipaly, Lerby	4,481	Sigit Budiyanto	4
15 March – 16:30	3	Madura United	Home	3–1	Platje (2), Pacheco	8,223	Aprisman Aranda	2
4 April – 21:30	4	Persiraja	Away					
9 April – 19:30	5	PSM	Away					
19 April – 19:30	6	TIRA-Persikabo	Home					
23 April – 21:30	7	Persib	Away					
4 May – 21:30	8	PSIS	Home					
18 May – 21:30	10	Persebaya	Home					
31 May – 19:30	9	Borneo	Away					
12 June – 16:30	11	Bhayangkara	Away					
19 June – 16:30	12	Persik	Home					
28 June – 16:30	13	Persija	Away					
2 July – 21:30	14	Persipura	Home					
7 July – 19:30	15	Persela	Away					
15 July – 18:30	16	Arema	Home					
19 July – 19:30	17	PSS	Away					
24 July – 16:30	18	Persita	Away					
28 July – 19:30	19	Barito Putera	Home					
2 August – 19:30	20	Madura United	Away					
6 August – 19:30	21	Persiraja	Home					
14 August – 19:00	22	PSM	Home					
18 August – 16:30	23	TIRA-Persikabo	Away					
22 August – 21:30	24	Persib	Home					
30 August – 16:30	25	PSIS	Away					
9 September – 19:30	26	Borneo	Home					
15 September – 16:30	27	Persebaya	Away					
19 September – 19:30	28	Bhayangkara	Home					
26 September – 16:30	29	Persik	Away					
4 October – 19:30	30	Persija	Home					
14 October – 16:30	31	Persipura	Away					
19 October – 19:30	32	Persela	Home					
25 October – 16:30	33	Arema	Away					
TBD – --:--	34	PSS	Home					

=== AFC Champions League ===
AFC Champions League match details
Date	Round	Opponent	Venue	Result	Scorers	Attendance	Referee
14 January – 19:30	Preliminary round 1	(Singapore) Tampines Rovers	Away	5–3 (a.e.t.)	Platje (2), Rahmat, Lilipaly, Saimima	1,400	(Jordan) Ahmad Yacoub Ibrahim
21 January – 16:35	Preliminary round 2	(Australia) Melbourne Victory	Away	0–5		5,387	(Saudi Arabia) Mohammed Al-Hoish

=== AFC Cup ===
Pos	Team	Pld	W	D	L	GF	GA	GD	Pts
1	(Philippines) Ceres–Negros	3	2	1	0	10	2	+8	7
2	(Vietnam) Than Quảng Ninh	3	1	1	1	7	7	0	4
3	(Cambodia) Svay Rieng	3	1	0	2	3	9	−6	3 (Note: Head-to-head points: Svay Rieng 3, Bali United 0.)
4	(Indonesia) Bali United	3	1	0	2	5	7	−2	3

Source: AFC
Rules for classification: Tiebreakers
Notes:

AFC Cup match details
Date	Round	Opponent	Venue	Result	Scorers	Attendance	Referee
11 February – 19:30	Group stage	(Vietnam) Than Quảng Ninh	Home	4–1	Rahmat, Platje (2), Spasojević	5,750	(Syria) Masoud Tufayelieh
25 February – 19:00	Group stage	(Cambodia) Svay Rieng	Away	1–2	Spasojević	2,106	(Oman) Mahmood Al-Majarafi
11 March – 19:30	Group stage	(Philippines) Ceres–Negros	Away	0–4		1	(Tajikistan) Sadullo Gulmurodi
23 September – --:--	Group stage	(Philippines) Ceres–Negros	Neutral				
26 September – --:--	Group stage	(Vietnam) Than Quảng Ninh	Neutral				
29 September – --:--	Group stage	(Cambodia) Svay Rieng	Neutral				

== Player details ==
=== Appearances and goals ===
No.	Pos	Nat	Player	Total		Liga 1		AFC CL		AFC Cup		ASEAN CC	
No.	Pos	Nat	Player	Apps	Goals	Apps	Goals	Apps	Goals	Apps	Goals	Apps	Goals
1	GK	(Indonesia) IDN	Nadeo Argawinata	3	0	0	0	0	0	3	0	0	0
4 (98)	MF	(Indonesia) IDN	Arapenta Poerba	0	0	0	0	0	0	0	0	0	0
6	MF	(Iraq) IRQ	Brwa Nouri	8	0	2+1	0	2	0	3	0	0	0
7	FW	(Netherlands) NED	Melvin Platje	7	6	3	2	2	2	2	2	0	0
8	MF	(Indonesia) IDN	Muhammad Taufiq	1	0	0	0	0	0	0+1	0	0	0
9	FW	(Indonesia) IDN	Ilija Spasojević	3	2	1	0	0	0	2	2	0	0
10	FW	(Indonesia) IDN	Lerby Eliandry	5	1	2	1	0	0	1+2	0	0	0
11	MF	(Indonesia) IDN	Yabes Roni	5	0	1+1	0	2	0	0+1	0	0	0
13	DF	(Indonesia) IDN	Gunawan Dwi Cahyo	1	0	1	0	0	0	0	0	0	0
14	MF	(Indonesia) IDN	Fadil Sausu (captain)	8	0	3	0	2	0	3	0	0	0
15	DF	(Indonesia) IDN	Gavin Kwan Adsit	6	0	1	0	0+2	0	2+1	0	0	0
16	MF	(Indonesia) IDN	Hariono	2	0	1	0	0+1	0	0	0	0	0
17	FW	(Indonesia) IDN	Irfan Jauhari	0	0	0	0	0	0	0	0	0	0
18	MF	(Indonesia) IDN	I Kadek Agung Widnyana	2	0	0+2	0	0	0	0	0	0	0
20	MF	(Indonesia) IDN	Sidik Saimima	5	1	1	0	0+2	1	0+2	0	0	0
21	GK	(Indonesia) IDN	Rakasurya Handika	0	0	0	0	0	0	0	0	0	0
22	DF	(Indonesia) IDN	Dias Angga Putra	2	0	1	0	1	0	0	0	0	0
23	MF	(Indonesia) IDN	Fahmi Al-Ayyubi	4	0	1+1	0	0	0	1+1	0	0	0
24	DF	(Indonesia) IDN	Ricky Fajrin	8	0	3	0	2	0	3	0	0	0
27	DF	(Indonesia) IDN	Agus Nova Wiantara	0	0	0	0	0	0	0	0	0	0
28	MF	(Indonesia) IDN	Rian Firmansyah	0	0	0	0	0	0	0	0	0	0
32	DF	(Indonesia) IDN	Leonard Tupamahu	5	0	2+1	0	1	0	1	0	0	0
33	DF	(Indonesia) IDN	I Made Andhika Wijaya	3	0	1	0	1	0	1	0	0	0
35	DF	(Indonesia) IDN	Haudi Abdillah	4	0	0+1	0	1	0	2	0	0	0
43	DF	(Brazil) BRA	Willian Pacheco	8	1	3	1	2	0	3	0	0	0
59	GK	(Indonesia) IDN	Wawan Hendrawan	5	0	3	0	2	0	0	0	0	0
77 (91)	MF	(Indonesia) IDN	Rahmat	7	2	1+1	0	0+2	1	3	1	0	0
80	MF	(Portugal) POR	Paulo Sérgio	5	0	1	0	2	0	2	0	0	0
85	DF	(Indonesia) IDN	Michael Orah	0	0	0	0	0	0	0	0	0	0
87	MF	(Indonesia) IDN	Stefano Lilipaly	6	2	1+1	1	2	1	1+1	0	0	0
93	GK	(Indonesia) IDN	Samuel Reimas	0	0	0	0	0	0	0	0	0	0

- Source: Match results
- Ordered by player's number.
- No. in bracket is the player's number in AFC Competitions.

=== Disciplinary record ===
No.	Pos	Nat	Player	Total			Liga 1			AFC CL			AFC Cup			ASEAN CC		
No.	Pos	Nat	Player	Yellow card	Second yellow card	Red card	Yellow card	Second yellow card	Red card	Yellow card	Second yellow card	Red card	Yellow card	Second yellow card	Red card	Yellow card	Second yellow card	Red card
6	MF	(Iraq) IRQ	Brwa Nouri	2	0	0	0	0	0	1	0	0	1	0	0	0	0	0
7	FW	(Netherlands) NED	Melvin Platje	1	0	0	0	0	0	0	0	0	1	0	0	0	0	0
9	FW	(Indonesia) IDN	Ilija Spasojević	1	0	0	1	0	0	0	0	0	0	0	0	0	0	0
15	DF	(Indonesia) IDN	Gavin Kwan Adsit	3	0	0	1	0	0	0	0	0	2	0	0	0	0	0
16	MF	(Indonesia) IDN	Hariono	1	0	0	1	0	0	0	0	0	0	0	0	0	0	0
23	MF	(Indonesia) IDN	Fahmi Al-Ayyubi	2	0	0	1	0	0	0	0	0	1	0	0	0	0	0
24	DF	(Indonesia) IDN	Ricky Fajrin	1	0	0	1	0	0	0	0	0	0	0	0	0	0	0
35	DF	(Indonesia) IDN	Haudi Abdillah	1	0	0	0	0	0	0	0	0	1	0	0	0	0	0
43	DF	(Brazil) BRA	Willian Pacheco	3	0	0	1	0	0	1	0	0	1	0	0	0	0	0
87	MF	(Indonesia) IDN	Stefano Lilipaly	1	0	0	1	0	0	0	0	0	0	0	0	0	0	0

- Source: Match results
- Ordered by player's number.
- (yellow card) = Number of bookings; (second yellow card) = Number of sending offs after a second yellow card; (red card) = Number of sending offs by a direct red card.

== Transfers ==
=== Transfers in ===
Date	Pos.	Name	From	Fee	Ref.
28 December 2019	MF	(Indonesia) Hariono	Persib	Free transfer	
28 December 2019	DF	(Indonesia) Gavin Kwan Adsit	Barito Putera	Free transfer	
29 December 2019	GK	(Indonesia) Nadeo Argawinata	Borneo	Undisclosed	
31 December 2019	MF	(Indonesia) Rahmat	PSM	Undisclosed	
5 January 2020	FW	(Indonesia) Lerby Eliandry	Borneo	Undisclosed	
6 January 2020	MF	(Indonesia) Sidik Saimima	PSS	Free transfer	
12 January 2020	MF	(Indonesia) Reza Irfana	Youth sector	Promoted	
12 January 2020	MF	(Indonesia) Kadek Haarlem Anggariva	Youth sector	Promoted	
22 February 2020	FW	(Indonesia) Irfan Jauhari	Youth sector	Promoted	
23 July 2020	FW	(Indonesia) Kadek Dimas Satria	Youth sector	Promoted	
23 July 2020	DF	(Indonesia) Komang Tri	Youth sector	Promoted	

=== Transfers out ===
Date	Pos.	Name	To	Fee	Ref.
27 December 2019	MF	(Indonesia) Ahmad Agung	PSM (Note: Joined on 8 January 2020.)	Free transfer	
28 December 2019	MF	(Indonesia) Ahmad Maulana Putra	Semen Padang (Note: Joined on 27 February 2020.)	Free transfer	
28 December 2019	DF	(Indonesia) Adi Parwa	Sulut United (Note: Joined on 28 December 2019.)	Free transfer	
29 December 2019	GK	(Indonesia) Diky Indrayana	Borneo (Note: Joined on 7 January 2020.)	Free transfer	
29 December 2019	GK	(Indonesia) I Putu Pager Wirajaya	Mitra Kukar (Note: Joined on 22 February 2020.)	Free transfer	
30 December 2019	MF	(Indonesia) I Nyoman Sukarja	Free agent	Released	
30 December 2019	FW	(Indonesia) Aldino Herdianto	Badak Lampung (Note: Joined on 15 January 2020.)	Free transfer	
31 December 2019	FW	(Indonesia) Martinus Novianto	PSIM (Note: Joined on 8 February 2020.)	Free transfer	
31 December 2019	DF	(Indonesia) Dallen Doke	Persita (Note: Joined on 9 January 2020.)	Free transfer	
16 January 2020	MF	(Indonesia) Miftahul Hamdi	Persiraja	Undisclosed	
12 February 2020	FW	(Indonesia) Irfan Bachdim	PSS	Undisclosed	
4 August 2020	DF	(Indonesia) Anan Lestaluhu	Free agent	Released	
5 October 2020	MF	(Portugal) Paulo Sérgio	Free agent	Released	

=== Loans out ===
Start date	Pos.	Name	To	End date	Ref.
17 January 2020	DF	(Indonesia) Gusti Sandria	Sulut United	End of season	
27 August 2020	DF	(Indonesia) Agus Nova Wiantara (Note: Back early out of necessity.)	Sulut United	End of season	
30 August 2020	FW	(Indonesia) Hanis Saghara Putra	PSMS	End of season	
