= 2019 Bali United F.C. season =

Indonesian football club season

Bali United
2019 season
- Chairman: Pieter Tanuri
- Head coach: Stefano Cugurra
- Stadium: Kapten I Wayan Dipta Stadium
- Liga 1: 1st
- Piala Indonesia: Quarter-finals
- Top goalscorer: League: Ilija Spasojević (16); All: Ilija Spasojević (19)
- Highest home attendance: 25,057 (vs Madura United, 22 December)
- Lowest home attendance: 9,696 (vs Badak Lampung, 22 October)
Home colours	Away colours	Third colours

The 2019 season was the fifth season of competitive association football and fourth season in the Liga 1 played by Bali United Football Club, a professional football club based in Gianyar, Bali, Indonesia. Their 11th-place finish in 2018 meant it was their fourth successive season in Liga 1.

This season would be Bali United's first with head coach Stefano Cugurra, who stepped in for Widodo Cahyono Putro. Coming into the season, Bali United were in the round of 32 of the Piala Indonesia for the first time in their history.

The season would see the departures of original players such as I Made Wardana, I Gede Sukadana, Yandi Munawar, Novan Sasongko, Taufik Hidayat, Syaiful Cahya, Junius R. Bate, and Feby Eka Putra, as well as foreign recruits Nick van der Velden, Mahamadou N'Diaye, and Demerson. Players such as Haudi Abdillah, Samuel Reimas, Michael Orah, Willian Pacheco, Leonard Tupamahu, Fahmi Al-Ayyubi, Anan Lestaluhu, and Paulo Sérgio were brought in as replacements.

On 2 December 2019, the club won their first official title since the club formed, after second place Borneo draw to PSM and followed by a 2–0 win at Semen Padang to give Bali United the title with four games to spare.

== Background ==
The 2018 season was Widodo Cahyono Putro's second start to a season as head coach of Bali United, having taken charge in May 2017. The club had their first ever Asian competitions appearances as they competed in AFC Champions League, where they knocked out in the preliminary round 2 by Thailand's side Chiangrai United. That result made them got a consolation place in the AFC Cup, where they had poor results, finishing last in their group. Bali United reached the round of 32 in the Piala Indonesia, which would be held in 2019 season. Widodo resigned as head coach in November 2018 with Bali United was in 7th place of the table. He was replaced by Eko Purdjianto who acted as caretaker and finished the season in 11th place.

== Pre-season and friendlies ==
=== Friendlies ===
Friendlies match details
Date	Opponent	Venue	Result	Scorers
9 February – 16:40	Undiksha	Home	5–2	Spasojević (2), Platje, Undiksha's player (o.g.), Sérgio
17 March – 18:05	Indonesia U22s	Home	0–3	
20 March – 16:30	Indonesia	Home	1–1	Gunawan
30 March – 16:15	Putra Tresna	Home	8–0	Sulendra (o.g.), Platje (3), Sérgio, Hamdi, Martinus, Nouri
6 April – 16:00	Putra Tresna	Home	5–0	Bachdim, Sérgio, Hamdi, Saghara, Yabes
13 April – 16:00	(Timor-Leste) Boavista	Home	4–1	Bachdim, Lilipaly, Fadil, Yabes
24 May – 21:00	Persiba	Home	1–0	Fahmi
14 June – 19:30	Indonesia U23s	Home	0–0	

=== Indonesia President's Cup ===
Indonesia President's Cup match details
Date	Round	Opponent	Venue	Result	Scorers	Attendance	Referee
3 March – 19:30	Group stage	Mitra Kukar	Neutral	3–0	Platje (2), Spasojević	735	Hadiyana
11 March – 19:30	Group stage	Semen Padang	Neutral	2–1	Platje, Fadil	932	Tabrani
14 March – 19:30	Group stage	Bhayangkara	Neutral	1–4	Platje	738	Hadiyana

=== Trofeo Hamengkubuwono X ===
Trofeo Hamengkubuwono X match details
Date	Round	Opponent	Venue	Result	Scorers	Referee
8 September – 14:30	Trofeo match 1	PSIM	Neutral	0–0 (3–4 p)		Ikhsan Prasetya Jati
8 September – 16:00	Trofeo match 2	Indonesia U23s	Neutral	0–1		Fariq Hitaba

== Review and events ==
=== January–April ===
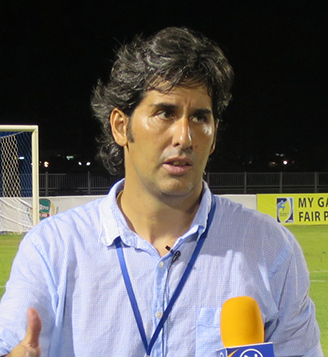
Stefano Cugurra was appointed as head-coach after Widodo Cahyono Putro resigned last season.

Bali United started the season by playing away to Liga 2 team Blitar United in the round of 32 of the Piala Indonesia. Ilija Spasojević gave Bali United the lead with a header from Fadil Sausu's free kick in the 9th minute. Bali United doubled the lead when Melvin Platje taped Spasojević's pass into the net. They sealed the game in the 63rd minute when Platje scored with a penalty and secured a 3–0 win in the first leg.

On the first day of the new month, a brace from Spasojević and goals from Irfan Bachdim and Platje secured Bali United's place in round of 16 of Piala Indonesia in a 4–0 win over Blitar United and 7–0 win on aggregate. The winning streak continues when Bali United won away against Persela. Jairo Rodrigues scored an own goal and failed to convert the penalty that was given after being saved by Wawan Hendrawan sealed 1–0 victory in the first leg. Four days later, Fadil scored a brace in the second leg at home secured a 3–0 win on aggregate against Persela and Bali United through to the quarter-finals.

After almost two-month break because of pre-season tournament Piala Presiden, Piala Indonesia continues with the first leg of quarter-finals when they faced Persija. Shahar Ginanjar saved a penalty from Stefano Lilipaly in the 12th minute, made the score goalless in the first half. Eight minutes into the second half, Lilipaly paid for his failure with a goal after receiving a pass from Bachdim. He scored his second goal in this match in the 80th minute, before Bambang Pamungkas narrow the margin and made the score 2–1 for Bali United.

=== May–August ===
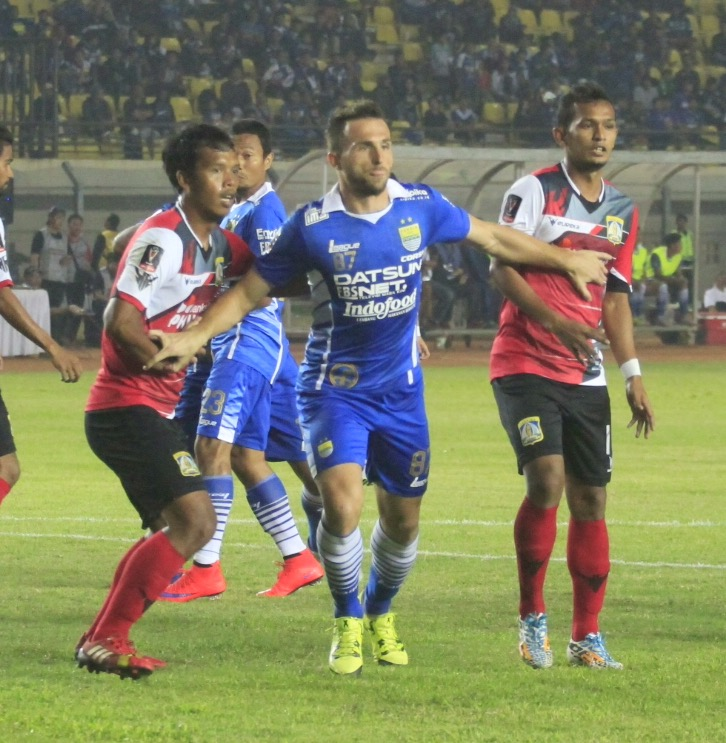
Ilija Spasojević scored Bali United's first league goal of the season.

Bali United were beaten 1–0 away by Persija in the second leg of Piala Indonesia quarter-finals, with Ismed Sofyan scored from a penalty and ended their journey in Piala Indonesia as they lose on away goals. Bali United then kicked off their league season with a home game against Persebaya on 16 May 2019. Bali United took a lead when Ilija Spasojević successfully scored after receiving a pass from Stefano Lilipaly. However, 15 minutes before the half time, Mokhamad Syaifuddin unleashed a right-foot shot and equalized for Persebaya. In the second half, Paulo Sérgio secured their first win of the season with a kick that hit one of the Persebaya defender and scored his first goal in his official debut. Bali United played the next game against 2017 Liga 1 champions, Bhayangkara. Yabes Roni's kick in 70th minute was enough for Bali United to get their first ever win over Bhayangkara since 2016. In their third consecutive home games after Persija requested an exchange of home status due to security reasons after the 2019 Indonesian general election in Jakarta, they got their third consecutive win after Paulo Sérgio scored a chip shot over Andritany Ardhiyasa in the 82nd minute making the score 1–0.

Bali United flagged June off with their fourth consecutive home game against PSIS on 22 June 2019 after the week 4 match against Kalteng Putra was postponed to 26 June 2019. They also secure their fourth consecutive win after Spasojević scored with a header in the 70th minute. In the first away game of the season, Bali United played Kalteng Putra. The match was postponed from its original date of 15 June due to the FIFA international friendly match agenda for Indonesia national football team and Lebaran. Ricky Fajrin scored an early lead with a header from the corner kick of Paulo Sérgio. However, Kalteng Putra scored a quick goal, three minutes in the second half when Yohanes Pahabol put a pass from free-kick situation in the net and equalized. Both teams played with 10 men after Leonard Tupamahu and Diogo Campos was sent off in the 60th minute. Bali United took advantage when Willian Pacheco scored. But Antoni Nugroho equalized once again and the match ended in 2–2 draw, ended their consecutive win. Bali United got their first win in away games after won 3–0 against 10-men Liga 1 debutant Badak Lampung. Spasojević scored in the 33rd minute after receiving a long pass from Fadil Sausu. Fadil again made a beautiful pass for Pacheco's goal in 66th minute. Two minutes after that, Melvin Platje scored his first goal since came back from injury with a drive shot and finished the month at the top of the table.

With the match against Borneo on 4 July was postponed, Bali United started July on the road against Barito Putera on 14 July with a 0–1 lost after Rafael Silva scored the goals 10 minutes before the game ended, while two of Bali United's goal were disallowed. This lost ended Bali United's five unbeaten run. Bali United again lost 2–0 at away to Persela, who took the lead in the first half through Alex Gonçalves in 15th and 45th minute. On 22 July, they finally played at home after four consecutive away games when they faced Liga 1 debutant and 2018 Liga 2 champions, PSS. Bali United took the early lead when Spasojević scored from a penalty. Asyraq Gufron scored to his own goal made the home team lead 2–0 in the first half. Yevhen Bokhashvili narrow the score after converted a penalty in 65th minute. The third penalty was awarded to this match in the 82nd minute and Platje successfully sealed the game 3–1, ended the two losing streak. Bali United's last match of the month was played at away on the 26th against Persib. A late goal from Spasojević secured Bali United a 2–0 away victory after Lilipaly scored the other goal.

On the first day of August, they beat the newly crowned Piala Indonesia winner, PSM 1–0 at home, in which Platje scored in the 60th minute with a header. In the next home game, Bali United faced Semen Padang. Semen Padang were leading 1–0 with an own goal from Pacheco, before Bali United pulled a comeback within 2 minutes with a goal each from Fajrin and Platje just before the half-time. Bali United finished the game 4–1 with two more goals in the second half from Platje and substitutes Irfan Bachdim. On 15 August, Bali United beat league leaders TIRA-Persikabo 2–1 at Pakansari as Lilipaly scored a brace. This result made Bali United became the first team to beat TIRA-Persikabo this season and seized the top spot of the table once again. They went on to win their sixth match in a row on 20 August in a 1–0 away match against Madura United. Spasojević scored the only goal in the second half, while the home team finished the match with 10-men after Jaimerson Xavier was sent off. Four days later, Bali United resumed their winning streak after beating Arema 2–1 at home. Pacheco scored the opening goal in the 27th minute with a header. Makan Konaté scored an equalizer for Arema on 44th minute, before Spasojević scored the winning goal in the 57th minute, with a header. Bali United closed the last match at home for the first half of the season after beating Borneo in the delayed week 7 match. Spasojević opened the scoring with a shot from Platje's pass on 6th minute, and he doubled the lead in the 55th minute with a rebound shot from Fadil's free kick, before Renan Silva scored a consolation goal for Borneo in the 79th minute.

=== September–December ===
As the match against Persipura on 1 September was postponed due to riot in Jayapura, Bali United started their September with the first match in the second half of the season as they away to Bhayangkara. Goalless draw became the outcome of this match when one shots each from Ilija Spasojević and Stefano Lilipaly hit the crossbar. It also ended their eight winning streak. A goal from Melvin Platje earned Bali United a 1–0 win six days later, at away to the defending champions Persija. TIRA-Persikabo's defeat a day after meant the win for Bali United was enough to bring them a 10-point lead at the top of the table. Bali United's unbeaten streak nearly ended when Persebaya led 1–0 until in the 88 minute, before a free-kick from captain Fadil Sausu leveled and maintained their lead at the top of the table. They finished September with a narrow 2–1 win over 10-man Kalteng Putra after former Bali United's player I Gede Sukadana receive a second yellow card at the end of the first half. A header from Platje and Spasojević scored from penalty spot, extend their lead at the top of the table with 12 points and their unbeaten streak to 12 match.

After nearly three weeks off due to match postponement and international breaks, Bali United started their October horribly as their 12 unbeaten streak came to an end when they were destroyed by Borneo six goals without reply at Segiri where Lerby Eliandry, Renan Silva (2), Terens Puhiri (2), and Rifal Lastori scored the goals for the home team. This big lost also set their worst record defeat in their history so far. Bali United managed to rise from a painful defeat with a landslide 3–0 victory against Badak Lampung four days later. A free-kick goal from captain Fadil and brace from Spasojević gave them an 11th win at home this season. The five-goals drama came in the 3–2 victory over Barito Putera. Penalty from Spasojević leveled the score after Barito's goal inside the 10th minute. Willian Pacheco's header from Paulo Sérgio's corner kick made the score 2–1 before the half time whistle. Sérgio again made the assist from corner kick as Platje scored the third goal of Serdadu Tridatu. Rizky Pora managed to narrowed the score to 3–2 via counterattack. This result maintained their 100% win at home and their lead at the top of the table. Their perfect record at home this season came to an end as Persela equalized after Platje scored in the first half and Pacheco was red carded.

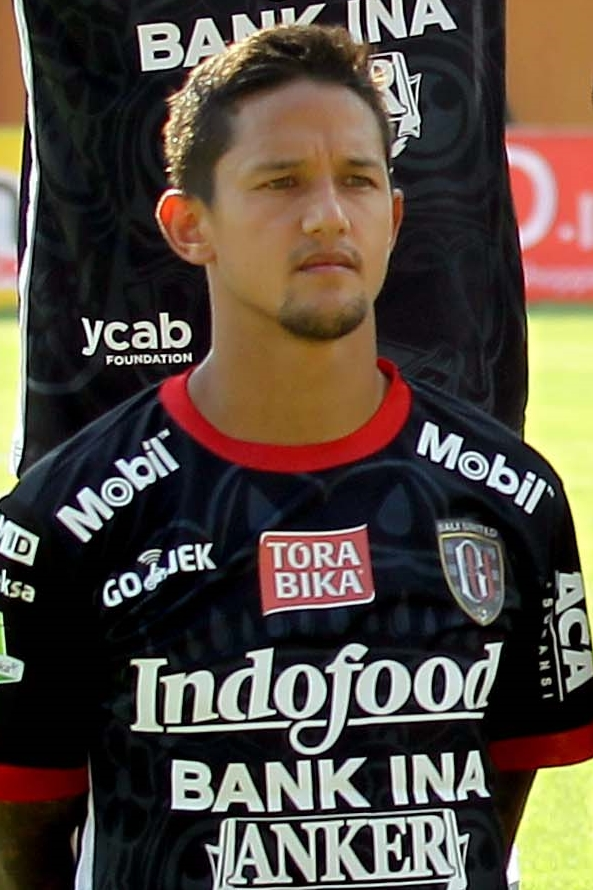
Irfan Bachdim scored an amazing free-kick against Persipura to keep Bali United's unbeaten record at home alive.

Bali United got their first point in November when they draw in away game against PSS. It was their first match of the four away matches in a row. They were again dropped two points against Persipura. Yohanis Tjoe scored to put Persipura in front in the 33rd minute. Bali United replied with two goals from Platje and Lilipaly, but todd Ferre in stoppage time equalized for the home team. Bali United dropped point even more where they lost 0–1 to PSIS and PSM. With Borneo, Persipura, and Madura United unable to won their respective matches in week 29, Bali United knew before their game against Persib that they need only four points to guarantee their status as champions. Kim Kurniawan opened the scoring for the visitors just before half-time, and in spite of Supardi Nasir's own goal equalized after Spasojević failed to converted a penalty, Persib led again with a quick counter. Bali United responded by scoring twice in six minute; Spasojević place the ball past I Made Wirawan with a back heel and Lilipaly shot after receiving long pass from Wawan Hendrawan. They closed November with only one point to clinch their first ever Liga 1 title.

Bali United recorded a 2–0 win against Semen Padang on 2 December 2019 to secure their first league title, even though before the game ended they were confirmed to be champions because Borneo failed to win at away to PSM in a match that was completed 30 minutes earlier. Spasojević, who was re-appointed captain in this match scored a brace ensuring a 17-point advantage in the standings. After clinched the title last week, Bali United went against Persipura at home without all of their foreign players and most were not regular players. Mamadou Samassa scored the goal for the visitors with a free-kick, but Irfan Bachdim keep their unbeaten streak at home alive with his free-kick. TIRA-Persikabo really ended Bali United's unbeaten streak at home with a narrow 1–0 win over the home team. At Kanjuruhan Stadium, Bali United second-tier squad lost 3–2 to Arema. Aldino Herdianto scored his first ever goal for Bali United in this match. Bali United's final game of the league season was against Madura United. They conceded goal from Aleksandar Rakić and Beto Gonçalves that tarnishes the trophy presentation at home.

== Match results ==
=== Liga 1 ===
Pos	Team	Pld	W	D	L	GF	GA	GD	Pts	Qualification or relegation
1	Bali United (C)	34	19	7	8	48	35	+13	64	Qualification for the AFC Champions League preliminary round 1 and ASEAN Club Championship group stage
2	Persebaya (Note: Persebaya would have qualified for the AFC Cup group stage had Bali United qualified for the AFC Champions League group stage. As Bali United failed to qualify for the AFC Champions League group stage, Persebaya's qualification in the AFC Cup was annulled.)	34	14	12	8	57	43	+14	54	Qualification for the ASEAN Club Championship group stage
3	Persipura	34	14	11	9	47	38	+9	53 (Note: Head-to-head points: Persipura (+2) 9 pts; Bhayangkara (+2) 7 pts; Madura United (–4) 1 pts.)	
4	Bhayangkara	34	14	11	9	51	43	+8	53	
5	Madura United	34	15	8	11	55	44	+11	53	

Source: Shopee Liga 1 2019, Soccerway
Rules for classification: 1) Points; 2) Head-to-head; 3) Goal difference; 4) Goals scored; 5) Drawing.
(C) Champions
Notes:

Liga 1 match details
Date	Week	Opponent	Venue	Result	Scorers	Attendance	Referee	Position
16 May – 21:30	1	Persebaya	Home	2–1	Spasojević, Sérgio	15,323	Dodi Setia Purnama	5
21 May – 21:30	2	Bhayangkara	Home	1–0	Yabes	15,215	Agus Fauzan	3
31 May – 21:30	3	Persija	Home	1–0	Sérgio	16,419	Dwi Purba	2
22 June – 16:30	5	PSIS	Home	1–0	Spasojević	15,283	Iwan Sukoco	1
26 June – 16:30	4	Kalteng Putra	Away	2–2	Fajrin, Pacheco	535	Wawan Rapiko	1
30 June – 19:30	6	Badak Lampung	Away	3–0	Spasojević, Pacheco, Platje	13,028	Hamim Tohari	1
14 July – 19:30	8	Barito Putera	Away	0–1		7,578	Iwan Sukoco	2
18 July – 16:30	9	Persela	Away	0–2		5,164	Oki Dwi Putra	2
22 July – 19:30	10	PSS	Home	3–1	Spasojević, Gufron (o.g.), Platje	17,477	Faulur Rosy	2
26 July – 19:30	11	Persib	Away	2–0	Lilipaly, Spasojević	23,642	Dwi Purba	2
1 August – 19:30	12	PSM	Home	1–0	Platje	17,906	Musthofa Umarella	2
9 August – 19:30	13	Semen Padang	Home	4–1	Fajrin, Platje (2), Bachdim	14,020	Tabrani	2
15 August – 19:30	14	TIRA-Persikabo	Away	2–1	Lilipaly (2)	10,840	Hamim Tohari	1
20 August – 19:30	15	Madura United	Away	1–0	Spasojević	3,250	Dwi Purba	1
24 August – 21:30	16	Arema	Home	2–1	Pacheco, Spasojević	21,597	Thoriq Alkatiri	1
28 August – 21:30	7	Borneo	Home	2–1	Spasojević (2)	13,411	Dodi Setia Purnama	1
13 September – 16:30	18	Bhayangkara	Away	0–0		848	Yudi Nurcahya	1
19 September – 16:30	19	Persija	Away	1–0	Platje	13,227	Dwi Purba	1
24 September – 19:30	20	Persebaya	Away	1–1	Fadil	32,450	Oki Dwi Putra	1
29 September – 19:30	21	Kalteng Putra	Home	2–1	Platje, Spasojević	20,939	Yudi Nurcahya	1
18 October – 19:30	23	Borneo	Away	0–6		5,732	Adi Riyanto	1
22 October – 19:30	24	Badak Lampung	Home	3–0	Fadil, Spasojević (2)	9,696	Ikhsan Prasetya Jati	1
27 October – 19:30	25	Barito Putera	Home	3–2	Spasojević, Pacheco, Platje	14,647	Yudi Nurcahya	1
31 October – 19:30	26	Persela	Home	1–1	Platje	16,846	Agus Fauzan	1
6 November – 16:30	27	PSS	Away	0–0		18,862	Hamim Tohari	1
11 November – 16:30	17	Persipura	Away	2–2	Platje, Lilipaly	250	Yeni Krisdianto	1
15 November – 19:30	22	PSIS	Away	0–1		10,339	Tabrani	1
23 November – 16:30	28	PSM	Away	0–1		7,327	Yudi Nurcahya	1
28 November – 21:45	29	Persib	Home	3–2	Supardi (o.g.), Spasojević, Lilipaly	22,000	Aprisman Aranda	1
2 December – 17:00	30	Semen Padang	Away	0–2	Spasojević (2)	4,118	Thoriq Alkatiri	1
8 December – 21:30	31	Persipura	Home	1–1	Bachdim	21,800	Oki Dwi Putra	1
12 December – 18:45	32	TIRA-Persikabo	Home	0–1		10,436	Musthofa Umarella	1
16 December – 16:30	33	Arema	Away	2–3	Aldino, Bachdim	4,318	Yudi Nurcahya	1
22 December – 20:00	34	Madura United	Home	0–2		25,057	Dwi Purba	1

=== Piala Indonesia ===
Piala Indonesia match details
Date	Round	Opponent	Venue	Result	Scorers	Referee
24 January – 20:00	Round of 32; First leg	Blitar United	Away	3–0	Spasojević, Platje (2)	Maulana Nugraha
1 February – 19:00	Round of 32; Second leg	Blitar United	Home	4–0	Platje, Bachdim, Spasojević (2)	Abdul Rahman Salasa
18 February – 20:00	Round of 16; First leg	Persela	Away	1–0	Jairo (o.g.)	Nusur Fadilah
22 February – 21:00	Round of 16; Second leg	Persela	Home	2–0	Fadil (2)	Handri Kristanto
26 April – 16:30	Quarter-finals; First leg	Persija	Home	2–1	Lilipaly (2)	Oki Dwi Putra
5 May – 16:30	Quarter-finals; Second leg	Persija	Away	0–1		Handri Kristanto

== Player details ==
=== Appearances and goals ===
No.	Pos	Nat	Player	Total		Liga 1		Piala Indonesia	
No.	Pos	Nat	Player	Apps	Goals	Apps	Goals	Apps	Goals
4	MF	(Indonesia) IDN	Ahmad Agung	13	0	1+12	0	0	0
5	DF	(Indonesia) IDN	Dallen Doke	1	0	1	0	0	0
6	MF	(Iraq) IRQ	Brwa Nouri	32	0	27	0	5	0
7	FW	(Netherlands) NED	Melvin Platje	26	13	19+3	10	4	3
8	MF	(Indonesia) IDN	Muhammad Taufiq	20	0	8+9	0	1+2	0
9	FW	(Indonesia) IDN	Ilija Spasojević	36	19	30+1	16	4+1	3
10	FW	(Indonesia) IDN	Irfan Bachdim	23	4	6+12	3	4+1	1
11	MF	(Indonesia) IDN	Yabes Roni	26	1	14+7	1	3+2	0
13	DF	(Indonesia) IDN	Gunawan Dwi Cahyo	18	0	12+3	0	3	0
14	MF	(Indonesia) IDN	Fadil Sausu (captain)	37	4	29+2	2	6	2
18	MF	(Indonesia) IDN	I Kadek Agung Widnyana	9	0	4+5	0	0	0
21	GK	(Indonesia) IDN	Rakasurya Handika	0	0	0	0	0	0
22	DF	(Indonesia) IDN	Dias Angga Putra	19	0	18+1	0	0	0
23	MF	(Indonesia) IDN	Fahmi Al-Ayyubi	23	0	8+15	0	0	0
24	DF	(Indonesia) IDN	Ricky Fajrin	26	2	20+1	2	5	0
26	FW	(Indonesia) IDN	Aldino Herdianto	4	1	2+2	1	0	0
28	MF	(Indonesia) IDN	Rian Firmansyah	1	0	0+1	0	0	0
32	DF	(Indonesia) IDN	Leonard Tupamahu	25	0	19+3	0	3	0
33	DF	(Indonesia) IDN	I Made Andhika Wijaya	22	0	15+1	0	6	0
35	DF	(Indonesia) IDN	Haudi Abdillah	15	0	12+3	0	0	0
43	DF	(Brazil) BRA	Willian Pacheco	30	4	24	4	6	0
59	GK	(Indonesia) IDN	Wawan Hendrawan	37	0	31	0	6	0
65	MF	(Indonesia) IDN	Kadek Haarlem Anggariva	0	0	0	0	0	0
77	MF	(Indonesia) IDN	Miftahul Hamdi	13	0	2+6	0	1+4	0
80	MF	(Portugal) POR	Paulo Sérgio	30	2	26	2	4	0
83	MF	(Indonesia) IDN	Reza Irfana	0	0	0	0	0	0
85	DF	(Indonesia) IDN	Michael Orah	19	0	14+3	0	1+1	0
87	MF	(Indonesia) IDN	Stefano Lilipaly	34	7	26+4	5	4	2
93	GK	(Indonesia) IDN	Samuel Reimas	3	0	3	0	0	0
97	GK	(Indonesia) IDN	Diky Indrayana	0	0	0	0	0	0
98	MF	(Indonesia) IDN	Arapenta Poerba	7	0	2+3	0	0+2	0
99	DF	(Indonesia) IDN	Anan Lestaluhu	2	0	1+1	0	0	0
Players transferred out during the season
2	DF	(Indonesia) IDN	Gusti Sandria	1	0	0	0	0+1	0
20	MF	(Indonesia) IDN	Sutanto Tan	2	0	0	0	0+2	0
29	MF	(Indonesia) IDN	Feby Eka Putra	1	0	0	0	0+1	0
30	MF	(Indonesia) IDN	Ahmad Maulana Putra	1	0	0	0	0+1	0

- Source: Match results
- Ordered by player's number.

=== Disciplinary record ===
No.	Pos	Nat	Player	Total			Liga 1			Piala Indonesia		
No.	Pos	Nat	Player	Yellow card	Second yellow card	Red card	Yellow card	Second yellow card	Red card	Yellow card	Second yellow card	Red card
4	MF	(Indonesia) IDN	Ahmad Agung	3	0	1	3	0	1	0	0	0
6	MF	(Iraq) IRQ	Brwa Nouri	11	0	0	9	0	0	2	0	0
7	FW	(Netherlands) NED	Melvin Platje	3	0	0	3	0	0	0	0	0
8	MF	(Indonesia) IDN	Muhammad Taufiq	1	0	0	1	0	0	0	0	0
9	FW	(Indonesia) IDN	Ilija Spasojević	4	0	0	4	0	0	0	0	0
10	FW	(Indonesia) IDN	Irfan Bachdim	2	0	0	2	0	0	0	0	0
11	MF	(Indonesia) IDN	Yabes Roni	3	0	0	3	0	0	0	0	0
13	DF	(Indonesia) IDN	Gunawan Dwi Cahyo	4	0	0	4	0	0	0	0	0
14	MF	(Indonesia) IDN	Fadil Sausu	2	0	0	1	0	0	1	0	0
22	DF	(Indonesia) IDN	Dias Angga Putra	3	0	0	3	0	0	0	0	0
23	MF	(Indonesia) IDN	Fahmi Al-Ayyubi	4	0	0	4	0	0	0	0	0
24	DF	(Indonesia) IDN	Ricky Fajrin	3	0	0	3	0	0	0	0	0
26	FW	(Indonesia) IDN	Aldino Herdianto	1	0	0	1	0	0	0	0	0
32	DF	(Indonesia) IDN	Leonard Tupamahu	8	2	1	6	2	1	2	0	0
33	DF	(Indonesia) IDN	I Made Andhika Wijaya	7	1	0	4	0	0	3	1	0
35	DF	(Indonesia) IDN	Haudi Abdillah	5	0	0	5	0	0	0	0	0
43	DF	(Brazil) BRA	Willian Pacheco	7	0	2	6	0	2	1	0	0
59	GK	(Indonesia) IDN	Wawan Hendrawan	2	0	0	2	0	0	0	0	0
80	MF	(Portugal) POR	Paulo Sérgio	12	0	0	10	0	0	2	0	0
85	DF	(Indonesia) IDN	Michael Orah	7	0	0	6	0	0	1	0	0
87	MF	(Indonesia) IDN	Stefano Lilipaly	2	0	0	2	0	0	0	0	0
Players transferred out during the season
20	MF	(Indonesia) IDN	Sutanto Tan	1	0	0	0	0	0	1	0	0

- Source: Match results
- Ordered by player's number.
- (yellow card) = Number of bookings; (second yellow card) = Number of sending offs after a second yellow card; (red card) = Number of sending offs by a direct red card.

== Transfers ==
=== Transfers in ===
Date	Pos.	Name	From	Fee	Ref.
11 January 2019	MF	(Indonesia) Ahmad Maulana Putra	Borneo	Free transfer	
12 January 2019	DF	(Indonesia) Haudi Abdillah	PSIS	Free transfer	
13 January 2019	GK	(Indonesia) Samuel Reimas	Perseru	Free transfer	
13 January 2019	DF	(Indonesia) Michael Orah	Kalteng Putra	Free transfer	
14 January 2019	DF	(Brazil) Willian Pacheco	(Malaysia) Selangor	Free transfer	
14 January 2019	DF	(Indonesia) Gunawan Dwi Cahyo	Persija	Free transfer	
14 January 2019	DF	(Indonesia) Gusti Sandria	PSMS	Free transfer	
14 January 2019	DF	(Indonesia) Leonard Tupamahu	Borneo	Free transfer	
2 February 2019	MF	(Portugal) Paulo Sérgio	Bhayangkara	Free transfer	
5 April 2019	MF	(Indonesia) Fahmi Al-Ayyubi	Persela	Free transfer	
21 May 2019	DF	(Indonesia) Anan Lestaluhu	Persija	Free transfer	
19 August 2019	FW	(Indonesia) Aldino Herdianto	PSMS	Free transfer	
15 September 2019	MF	(Indonesia) Rian Firmansyah	(Malaysia) Sarawak	Free transfer	

=== Transfers out ===
Date	Pos.	Name	To	Fee	Ref.
1 January 2019	GK	(Indonesia) I Made Wardana	Retired		
1 January 2019	MF	(Indonesia) I Gede Sukadana	Kalteng Putra (Note: Joined on 9 January 2019.)	Free transfer	
1 January 2019	FW	(Indonesia) Yandi Munawar	PSM (Note: Joined on 13 January 2019.)	Free transfer	
1 January 2019	MF	(Netherlands) Nick van der Velden	(Netherlands) Amsterdamsche (Note: Joined as player-coach on 12 June 2019 after announced his retirement on 9 December 2018.)	Free transfer	
1 January 2019	DF	(Indonesia) Novan Sasongko	Persebaya (Note: Joined on 27 January 2019.)	Free transfer	
1 January 2019	DF	(Mali) Mahamadou N'Diaye	(Morocco) FUS Rabat (Note: Joined on 1 July 2019.)	Free transfer	
12 January 2019	DF	(Indonesia) Taufik Hidayat	PSM	Free transfer	
12 January 2019	DF	(Indonesia) Syaiful Cahya	Semen Padang	Free transfer	
12 January 2019	DF	(Brazil) Demerson	Persela (Note: Joined on 10 September 2019.)	Free transfer	
24 April 2019	DF	(Indonesia) Junius R. Bate	PSS	Free transfer	
21 May 2019	MF	(Indonesia) Feby Eka Putra	Persija	Free transfer	
18 August 2019	MF	(Indonesia) Sutanto Tan	PSIM	Free transfer	

=== Loans out ===
Start date	Pos.	Name	To	End date	Ref.
1 March 2019	MF	(Indonesia) Feby Eka Putra	TIRA-Persikabo (Note: Until the end of TIRA-Persikabo's progress in 2019 Indonesia President's Cup.)	April 2019	
9 March 2019	GK	(Indonesia) I Putu Pager Wirajaya	Bogor (Note: Back early due to the dissolved of Bogor.)	End of season	
28 April 2019	GK	(Indonesia) I Putu Pager Wirajaya	PSIM (Note: Until the end of PSIM's progress in 2019 Liga 2.)	End of season	
27 May 2019	DF	(Indonesia) Gusti Sandria	Sulut United (Note: Until the end of Sulut United's progress in 2019 Liga 2.)	End of season	
27 May 2019	DF	(Indonesia) Adi Parwa	Sulut United	End of season	
27 May 2019	MF	(Indonesia) Ahmad Maulana Putra	Sulut United	End of season	
27 May 2019	FW	(Indonesia) Martinus Novianto	Sulut United	End of season	

== Awards ==
- Liga 1
  - Best Coach: Stefano Cugurra
  - Team of the Season: Wawan Hendrawan, Fadil Sausu, Ilija Spasojević, Ricky Fajrin
- Asosiasi Pesepakbola Profesional Indonesia (APPI) Indonesian Soccer Awards 2019
  - Best Goalkeeper: Wawan Hendrawan
  - Best Footballer: Fadil Sausu
  - Favorite Footballer: Ilija Spasojević
  - Best Coach: Stefano Cugurra
  - Best XI: Wawan Hendrawan, Willian Pacheco, Paulo Sérgio, Fadil Sausu
