= List of Indonesian football transfers 2019 =

This is a list of Indonesian football transfers featuring at least one Liga 1 club. The pre-season transfer window will be opened from 15 February to 9 May 2019 while the mid-season transfer window will be opened from 19 August to 16 September 2019, despite some contracts were already signed before the window. Free agent could join any club at any time.

== Transfers ==
All clubs without a flag are Indonesian clubs.

=== Pre-season ===
Below is the list of transfer that occur after 2018 season ends until the first transfer window is closed.

Date	Name	Moving from	Moving to	Type	Ref
9 December 2018	(Netherlands) Nick van der Velden	Bali United	Unattached	End of contract	
9 December 2018	(Montenegro) Vladimir Vujović	Bhayangkara	Retired		
10 December 2018	(Indonesia) Imam Arief Fadillah	PSM	Persib	End of loan	
11 December 2018	(Portugal) Élio Martins	Bhayangkara	Unattached	End of contract	
12 December 2018	(South Korea) Oh In-kyun	Persib	Unattached	End of contract	
13 December 2018	(Indonesia) Israel Wamiau	Arema	Unattached	End of contract	
13 December 2018	(Indonesia) Jefri Kurniawan	Arema	Unattached	End of contract	
13 December 2018	(Indonesia) Purwaka Yudhi	Arema	Unattached	End of contract	
13 December 2018	(Serbia) Srđan Ostojić	Arema	Unattached	End of contract	
13 December 2018	(Hong Kong) Sandro	PSM	Unattached	End of contract	
14 December 2018	(Australia) Dane Milovanović	Preston Lions (Australia)	Madura United	Free transfer	
14 December 2018	(Indonesia) I Made Wardana	Bali United	Retired		
14 December 2018	(Indonesia) Yandi Munawar	Bali United	Unattached	End of contract	
14 December 2018	(Portugal) Paulo Sérgio	Bhayangkara	Bali United	Free transfer	
14 December 2018	(France) Steven Paulle	PSM	Unattached	End of contract	
18 December 2018	(Brazil) Renan Alves	Borneo	Kedah (Malaysia)	Free transfer	
19 December 2018	(Mali) Mahamadou N'Diaye	Bali United	Unattached	End of contract	
19 December 2018	(Indonesia) Terens Puhiri	Port (Thailand)	Borneo	End of loan	
24 December 2018	(Indonesia) Andik Vermansyah	Kedah (Malaysia)	Madura United	Free transfer	
25 December 2018	(Indonesia) Abdullah Safei	PSM	Unattached	End of contract	
25 December 2018	(Indonesia) Agi Pratama	PSM	Unattached	End of contract	
25 December 2018	(Indonesia) Ahmad Hari Ajis	PSM	Unattached	End of contract	
25 December 2018	(Indonesia) Ardan Aras	PSM	Unattached	End of contract	
25 December 2018	(Indonesia) Arsyad Yusgiantoro	PSM	Unattached	End of contract	
25 December 2018	(Indonesia) Fauzan Jamal	PSM	Unattached	End of contract	
25 December 2018	(Indonesia) Syaiful Syamsuddin	PSM	Unattached	End of contract	
25 December 2018	(Indonesia) Muhammad Ridho	Borneo	Madura United	Free transfer	
26 December 2018	(Indonesia) Evan Dimas	Selangor (Malaysia)	Barito Putera	Free transfer	
26 December 2018	(Indonesia) Ryuji Utomo	PTT Rayong (Thailand)	Persija	Free transfer	
28 December 2018	(Brazil) Wallace Costa	Persela	Unattached	End of contract	
28 December 2018	(Turkmenistan) Ahmet Ataýew	Persela	Unattached	End of contract	
29 December 2018	(Indonesia) Eka Ramdani	Persib	Retired		
29 December 2018	(Indonesia) Fandry Imbiri	Persebaya	Madura United	Free transfer	
30 December 2018	(Serbia) Petar Planić	PSIS	Unattached	End of contract	
30 December 2018	(Indonesia) Rizky Darmawan	Persija	Unattached	End of contract	
31 December 2018	(Indonesia) Juan Revi	Semen Padang	Arema	End of loan	
31 December 2018	(Indonesia) Hengky Ardiles	Semen Padang	Retired		
31 December 2018	(Indonesia) Guntur Pranata	Semen Padang	Unattached	End of contract	
31 December 2018	(Indonesia) Ngurah Nanak	Semen Padang	Unattached	End of contract	
31 December 2018	(Indonesia) Ibrahim Sanjaya	Semen Padang	Unattached	End of contract	
31 December 2018	(Indonesia) Febly Gushendar	Semen Padang	Unattached	End of contract	
31 December 2018	(Indonesia) Elthon Maran	Semen Padang	Unattached	End of contract	
31 December 2018	(Indonesia) Mardiono	Semen Padang	Unattached	End of contract	
31 December 2018	(Indonesia) Gugum Gumilar	Semen Padang	Unattached	End of contract	
31 December 2018	(Indonesia) Asri Akbar	Persija	Borneo	Free transfer	
31 December 2018	(Indonesia) Zulfiandi	Sriwijaya	Madura United	Free transfer	
31 December 2018	(Iran) Milad Zeneyedpour	Madura United	Unattached	End of contract	
31 December 2018	(Mali) Mamadou Samassa	Madura United	Unattached	End of contract	
1 January 2019	(Indonesia) Juan Revi	Arema	Unattached	End of contract	
1 January 2019	(Indonesia) Irvan Febrianto	Persebaya	Unattached	End of contract	
2 January 2019	(Indonesia) Rachmad Hidayat	PSMS	Bhayangkara	Free transfer	
2 January 2019	(Indonesia) Rudi Widodo	Persija	Unattached	End of contract	
3 January 2019	(Indonesia) Wasyiat Hasbullah	PSM	Kalteng Putra	Free transfer	
3 January 2019	(Indonesia) Yohanes Pahabol	Persebaya	Kalteng Putra	Free transfer	
3 January 2019	(Indonesia) Adam Maulana	Persebaya	Unattached	End of contract	
3 January 2019	(Brazil) Renan Silva	Persija	Borneo	Free transfer	
4 January 2019	(Indonesia) Ricky Kayame	Persebaya	Unattached	End of contract	
4 January 2019	(Indonesia) Rishadi Fauzi	Persebaya	Unattached	End of contract	
5 January 2019	(Indonesia) Dimas Galih	Persebaya	Unattached	End of contract	
5 January 2019	(Brazil) Bruno Matos	PKNS (Malaysia)	Persija	Free transfer	
6 January 2019	(Brazil) Bruno Silva	PSIS	Al-Ain (Saudi Arabia)	Free transfer	
6 January 2019	(Brazil) Diego Assis	Persela	Al-Ain (Saudi Arabia)	Free transfer	
6 January 2019	(Uzbekistan) Javlon Guseynov	AGMK (Uzbekistan)	Borneo	Free transfer	
6 January 2019	(Argentina) Jonatan Bauman	Persib	Kedah (Malaysia)	Free transfer	
7 January 2019	(Argentina) Matías Córdoba	Barito Putera	Retired		
7 January 2019	(Brazil) Douglas Packer	Barito Putera	Unattached	End of contract	
7 January 2019	(Brazil) Marcel Sacramento	Barito Putera	Unattached	End of contract	
7 January 2019	(Indonesia) Andrean Akbar	Barito Putera	Unattached	End of contract	
7 January 2019	(Indonesia) Bijahil Chalwa	Barito Putera	Unattached	End of contract	
7 January 2019	(Indonesia) Dian Agus	Barito Putera	Unattached	End of contract	
7 January 2019	(Indonesia) Dimas Ardika	Barito Putera	Unattached	End of contract	
7 January 2019	(Indonesia) Dona Saputra	Barito Putera	Unattached	End of contract	
7 January 2019	(Indonesia) Faisal Fakhri	Barito Putera	Unattached	End of contract	
7 January 2019	(Indonesia) Fajar Handika	Barito Putera	Unattached	End of contract	
7 January 2019	(Indonesia) Firly Apriansyah	Barito Putera	Unattached	End of contract	
7 January 2019	(Indonesia) Jajang Sukmara	Barito Putera	Unattached	End of contract	
7 January 2019	(Indonesia) Mariando Uropmabin	Barito Putera	Unattached	End of contract	
7 January 2019	(Indonesia) Nico Fadillah	Barito Putera	Unattached	End of contract	
7 January 2019	(Indonesia) Talaohu Musafri	Barito Putera	Unattached	End of contract	
7 January 2019	(Indonesia) Ilham Armaiyn	Selangor (Malaysia)	Bhayangkara	Free transfer	
7 January 2019	(Indonesia) Saddil Ramdani	Persela	Pahang (Malaysia)	Free transfer	
7 January 2019	(Indonesia) Alfonsius Kelvan	Persebaya	Borneo	Free transfer	
8 January 2019	(Indonesia) Heri Susanto	PSM	Persija	Free transfer	
8 January 2019	(Indonesia) Novan Sasongko	Bali United	Persebaya	Free transfer	
8 January 2019	(Indonesia) Ravi Murdianto	Madura United	PSCS	Free transfer	
9 January 2019	(Indonesia) Sandy Firmansyah	Sriwijaya	Arema	Free transfer	
9 January 2019	(Indonesia) Rachmat Latief	Martapura	Arema	Free transfer	
9 January 2019	(Indonesia) Ikhfanul Alam	PSIR	Arema	Free transfer	
9 January 2019	(Uzbekistan) Pavel Smolyachenko	Metallurg Bekabad (Uzbekistan)	Arema	Free transfer	
9 January 2019	(Brazil) Robert Gladiador	Esportivo (Brazil)	Arema	Free transfer	
9 January 2019	(Indonesia) Ahmad Mahrus Bachtiar	Semen Padang	Barito Putera	Free transfer	
9 January 2019	(Brazil) David da Silva	Persebaya	Pohang Steelers (South Korea)	Free transfer	
9 January 2019	(Indonesia) Marckho Meraudje	Sriwijaya	Madura United	Free transfer	
9 January 2019	(Indonesia) I Gede Sukadana	Bali United	Kalteng Putra	Free transfer	
9 January 2019	(Montenegro) Srđan Lopičić	Unattached	Persib	Free transfer	
10 January 2019	(Indonesia) Victor Igbonefo	Persib	PTT Rayong (Thailand)	Free transfer	
10 January 2019	(Indonesia) Imam Arief Fadillah	Persib	Unattached	End of contract	
10 January 2019	(Indonesia) Hapit Ibrahim	PSIS	Sriwijaya	End of loan	
10 January 2019	(Indonesia) Wahyu Fitriyanto	PSIS	Unattached	End of contract	
10 January 2019	(Brazil) Jaimerson Xavier	Persija	Madura United	Free transfer	
10 January 2019	(Indonesia) Syaiful Cahya	Bali United	Semen Padang	Free transfer	
11 January 2019	(Indonesia) Dany Saputra	Bhayangkara	Persija	End of loan	
11 January 2019	(Indonesia) Marinus Wanewar	Bhayangkara	Persipura	End of loan	
11 January 2019	(Indonesia) Dendy Sulistyawan	Persela	Bhayangkara	End of loan	
11 January 2019	(Indonesia) Panggih Prio	Persipura	Bhayangkara	End of loan	
11 January 2019	(Indonesia) I Made Wirahadi	Kalteng Putra	Bhayangkara	End of loan	
11 January 2019	(Indonesia) Bagas Adi	Arema	Bhayangkara	Free transfer	
11 January 2019	(Indonesia) Gustur Cahyo	PSIS	Unattached	End of contract	
11 January 2019	(Uzbekistan) Jahongir Abdumominov	Istiklol (Tajikistan)	Persija	Free transfer	
12 January 2019	(Indonesia) Ichsan Pratama	PSS	Unattached	End of contract	
12 January 2019	(Indonesia) David Ariyanto	Borneo	Unattached	End of contract	
12 January 2019	(Indonesia) Ahmad Maulana Putra	Borneo	Bali United	Free transfer	
12 January 2019	(Brazil) Demerson	Bali United	Unattached	End of contract	
12 January 2019	(Indonesia) Melcior Majefat	PSIS	Unattached	End of contract	
13 January 2019	(Indonesia) Samuel Reimas	Perseru	Bali United	Free transfer	
13 January 2019	(Indonesia) Haudi Abdillah	PSIS	Bali United	Free transfer	
13 January 2019	(Indonesia) Frets Butuan	PSMS	Persib	Free transfer	
13 January 2019	(Indonesia) Erwin Ramdani	PSMS	Persib	Free transfer	
13 January 2019	(Indonesia) Abdul Aziz	PSMS	Persib	Free transfer	
13 January 2019	(Indonesia) Atep Rizal	Persib	Unattached	End of contract	
13 January 2019	(Indonesia) Airlangga Sutjipto	Persib	Unattached	End of contract	
13 January 2019	(Indonesia) Bayu Gatra	Madura United	PSM	Free transfer	
13 January 2019	(Indonesia) Beny Wahyudi	Madura United	PSM	Free transfer	
13 January 2019	(Indonesia) Hery Prasetyo	Madura United	PSM	Free transfer	
13 January 2019	(Indonesia) Munhar	Madura United	PSM	Free transfer	
13 January 2019	(Indonesia) Taufik Hidayat	Bali United	PSM	Free transfer	
13 January 2019	(Indonesia) Gufroni Al Maruf	Madura	Madura United	Free transfer	
14 January 2019	(Indonesia) Michael Orah	Kalteng Putra	Bali United	Free transfer	
14 January 2019	(Indonesia) Gunawan Dwi Cahyo	Persija	Bali United	Free transfer	
14 January 2019	(Indonesia) Leonard Tupamahu	Borneo	Bali United	Free transfer	
14 January 2019	(Indonesia) Gusti Sandria	PSMS	Bali United	Free transfer	
14 January 2019	(Brazil) Willian Pacheco	Selangor (Malaysia)	Bali United	Free transfer	
14 January 2019	(Indonesia) Makarius Suruan	Perseru	Borneo	Free transfer	
14 January 2019	(Indonesia) Finky Pasamba	PSMP	Borneo	Free transfer	
14 January 2019	(Australia) Aaron Evans	Barito Putera	PSM	Free transfer	
14 January 2019	(Finland) Eero Markkanen	Dalkurd (Sweden)	PSM	Free transfer	
14 January 2019	(Indonesia) Teja Paku Alam	Sriwijaya	Semen Padang	Free transfer	
14 January 2019	(Indonesia) Muhammad Rifqi	Barito Putera	Semen Padang	Free transfer	
15 January 2019	(Indonesia) Kushedya Hari Yudo	Kalteng Putra	PSS	Free transfer	
15 January 2019	(Indonesia) Andri Ibo	Persipura	Barito Putera	Free transfer	
15 January 2019	(Indonesia) Yakob Sayuri	Persitoli	Barito Putera	Free transfer	
15 January 2019	(Indonesia) M. Afandy Yusuf	PS Badung	Barito Putera	Free transfer	
16 January 2019	(Serbia) Aleksandar Rakić	PS TIRA	Madura United	Free transfer	
16 January 2019	(Indonesia) Hansamu Yama	Barito Putera	Persebaya	Free transfer	
16 January 2019	(Martinique) Loris Arnaud	Persela	PS TIRA	Free transfer	
16 January 2019	(Uzbekistan) Shukurali Pulatov	Neftchi Fergana (Uzbekistan)	Semen Padang	Free transfer	
17 January 2019	(Indonesia) O.K. John	Persebaya	Kalteng Putra	Free transfer	
18 January 2019	(Indonesia) Tony Sucipto	Persib	Persija	Free transfer	
18 January 2019	(Brazil) Neguete	Foolad (Iran)	Persija	Free transfer	
18 January 2019	(Indonesia) Esteban Vizcarra	Sriwijaya	Persib	Free transfer	
18 January 2019	(Indonesia) Ganjar Mukti	PS TIRA	PSIS	Free transfer	
19 January 2019	(Brazil) Victor Juffo	Vardar (North Macedonia)	Semen Padang	Free transfer	
19 January 2019	(Brazil) Ciro Alves	Chonburi (Thailand)	PS TIRA	Free transfer	
19 January 2019	(Uzbekistan) Khurshed Beknazarov	Khujand (Tajikistan)	PS TIRA	Free transfer	
20 January 2019	(Indonesia) Zalnando	Sriwijaya	Persib	Free transfer	
20 January 2019	(Indonesia) Hambali Tolib	Sriwijaya	Persela	Free transfer	
20 January 2019	(Indonesia) Muhammad Ridwan	Sriwijaya	Persela	Free transfer	
20 January 2019	(Indonesia) Achmad Arthur Sena	Perssu	Persela	Free transfer	
20 January 2019	(Indonesia) Reza Agus Febrian	Bali United U19s	Persela	Free transfer	
21 January 2019	(Indonesia) Septian David	Mitra Kukar	PSIS	Free transfer	
21 January 2019	(Indonesia) Beto Gonçalves	Sriwijaya	Madura United	Free transfer	
22 January 2019	(Indonesia) Bayu Pradana	Mitra Kukar	Barito Putera	Free transfer	
22 January 2019	(Brazil) Hilton Moreira	Persipura	Unattached	End of contract	
22 January 2019	(Indonesia) Prisca Womsiwor	Persipura	Barito Putera	Free transfer	
22 January 2019	(Indonesia) Nerius Alom	PSIS	Unattached	End of contract	
23 January 2019	(Brazil) Artur Jesus	Boa (Brazil)	Barito Putera	Free transfer	
23 January 2019	(Brazil) Lucas Silva	Zaria Bălți (Maldives)	Barito Putera	Free transfer	
23 January 2019	(Netherlands) Jan Lammers	RKC Waalwijk (Netherlands)	Borneo	Free transfer	
24 January 2019	(Indonesia) Titus Bonai	Borneo	Persipura	Free transfer	
25 January 2019	(Indonesia) Muhammad Alwi Slamat	PSMS	Persebaya	Free transfer	
26 January 2019	(Indonesia) Syahrian Abimanyu	Sriwijaya	Madura United	Free transfer	

=== Mid-season ===
Below is the list of transfer that occur during 2019 season (after first transfer window is closed) until the end of the season.

Date	Name	Moving from	Moving to	Type	Source
