= Stefano Cugurra =

Brazilian-born Indonesian football coach

Stefano Cugurra Teco
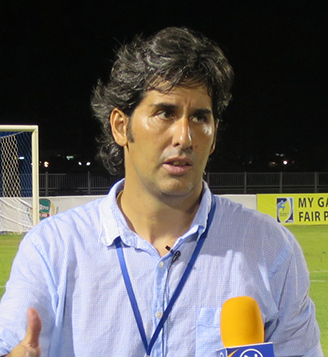
- Cugurra in 2016

Personal information
- Full name: Alessandro Stefano Cugurra Rodrigues
- Date of birth: 25 July 1974 (age 52)
- Place of birth: Rio de Janeiro, Brazil
- Height: 1.81 m (5 ft 11 in)

Team information
- Current team: Semen Padang (head coach)

Managerial career
- Years: Team
- 2009: Kuala Muda Naza
- 2010–2013: Chiangrai United
- 2013–2014: Phuket
- 2014–2015: Osotspa Samut Prakan
- 2015–2016: Royal Thai Navy
- 2017–2018: Persija Jakarta
- 2019–2025: Bali United
- 2025–2026: Barito Putera
- 2026–: Semen Padang

Alessandro Stefano Cugurra Rodrigues (born 25 July 1974), also known as Teco, is a Brazilian-born Indonesian professional football coach. He is currently the head coach of Championship club Semen Padang.

Teco started his career in Indonesia as a physical coach at Persebaya Surabaya in 2004. He rose to prominence coaching Persija Jakarta in late 2017. In 2018, he led Persija to their first Indonesian league title since 2001. Afterwards, he moved to Bali United, where he won his second consecutive league title. Under Teco's guidance, Bali United became the first Balinese club to win an Indonesian league title.

== Managerial career ==
=== Bali United ===
On 14 January 2019, Bali United appointed Teco as their new manager, replacing Widodo Cahyono Putro. On the same day eight new players were announced: Gunawan Dwi Cahyo, Michael Orah, Samuel Reimas, Ahmad Maulana Putra, Gusti Sandria, Haudi Abdillah, Leonard Tupamahu, and Brazilian player Willian Pacheco. Teco's first competitive match in charge was a 3–0 win against Blitar United in the second-round of the 2018-19 Piala Indonesia. In February, Teco signed Portuguese midfielder Paulo Sérgio to fill up the foreign player quota. On 16 May 2019, Teco's first league game, against Persebaya, ended in a 2–1 win, with goals from Spasojević and new signing Paulo Sérgio, who scored on his debut.

=== Barito Putera ===
On 2 June 2025, Barito Putera appointed Teco as their head coach, making the Banjarmasin-based club the first team he's coached since becoming an Indonesian citizen.

== Managerial statistics ==
As of match played 23 May 2025

Managerial record by team and tenure
Team	Nat	From	To	Record					Ref.
Team	Nat	From	To	G	W	D	L	Win %	Ref.
Chiangrai United	(Thailand)	13 February 2011	2 June 2013	13	1	5	7	7.69	
Jumpasri United	(Thailand)	1 July 2014	1 September 2015	36	13	10	13	36.11	
Navy	(Thailand)	22 September 2015	3 November 2016	42	13	11	18	30.95	
Persija Jakarta	(Indonesia)	1 January 2017	31 December 2018	76	39	19	18	51.32	
Bali United	(Indonesia)	14 January 2019	25 May 2025	197	101	42	54	51.27	
Barito Putera	(Indonesia)	2 June 2025	Present	1	1	0	0	100.00	
Career Total				364	167	87	110	45.88	

== Honours ==
Pelatih Fisik Persebaya Surabaya Divisi Utama : 2004

=== Manager ===
Persija Jakarta

- Liga 1: 2018
- Piala Presiden: 2018

Bali United

- Liga 1: 2019, 2021–22

Individual

- Liga 1 Best Coach: 2018, 2019
- APPI Indonesian Soccer Awards Best Coach: 2019
- Liga 1 Coach of the Month: November 2023
