= 2018 PSM Makassar season =

PSM Makassar
2018 season
- Owner: PT Persaudaraan Sepak Bola Makassar; Bosowa Corporation Group
- Chairman: Munafri Arifuddin
- Head coach: Robert Alberts
- Stadium: Andi Mattalatta Stadium
- Liga 1: 2nd
- Piala Indonesia: Second round
- President's Cup: Group stage
| Home colours | Away colours | Third colours |

The 2018 season of PSM Makassar.

== Players ==
=== Current squad ===
As of 31 July 2018

| No. | Name | Nat. | Date of birth (age) | Since | Signed from | Apps | Goals |
Goalkeepers
| 20 | Rivky Mokodompit | (Indonesia) | December 5, 1988 (aged 29) | 2017 | (Indonesia) Mitra Kukar | 25 | 0 |
| 30 | Imam Arief Fadillah | (Indonesia) | December 14, 1989 (aged 28) | 2018 | (Indonesia) Persib Bandung (Loan) | 0 | 0 |
| 33 | Syaiful Syamsuddin | (Indonesia) | June 11, 1993 (aged 24) | 2016 | | 12 | 0 |
| 97 | Hilman Syah | (Indonesia) | May 25, 1997 (aged 20) | 2017 | | 0 | 0 |
Defenders
| 2 | Hendra Wijaya | (Indonesia) | August 4, 1989 (aged 28) | 2009 | Youth System | 46 | 4 |
| 3 | Zulkifli Syukur | (Indonesia) | May 3, 1984 (aged 33) | 2016 | (Indonesia) Mitra Kukar | 29 | 1 |
| 4 | Wasyiat Hasbullah | (Indonesia) | October 25, 1994 (aged 23) | 2016 | Youth System | 36 | 0 |
| 5 | Reva Adi Utama | (Indonesia) | September 1, 1996 (aged 21) | 2017 | Youth System | 24 | 0 |
| 15 | Hasyim Kipuw | (Indonesia) | May 9, 1988 (aged 29) | 2018 | (Indonesia) Bali United F.C. | 0 | 0 |
| 22 | Ardan Aras | (Indonesia) | March 2, 1984 (aged 33) | 2014 | (Indonesia) Barito Putera | 70 | 5 |
| 25 | Muhammad Fauzan Jamal | (Indonesia) | June 6, 1988 (aged 29) | 2018 | (Indonesia) Persijap Jepara | 0 | 0 |
| 28 | Abdul Rahman Sulaeman | (Indonesia) | May 14, 1988 (aged 29) | 2018 | (Indonesia) Bali United F.C. | 0 | 0 |
| 36 | Muhammad Abdullah Syafii | (Indonesia) | March 11, 1996 (aged 21) | 2017 | Youth System | 5 | 0 |
| 38 | Ahmad Hari Satria | (Indonesia) | May 22, 1993 (aged 24) | 2018 | (Indonesia) Bhayangkara F.C. | 0 | 0 |
| 81 | Steven Paulle | (France) | February 10, 1986 (aged 31) | 2017 | (France) Dijon FCO | 27 | 1 |
Midfielders
| 10 | Marc Klok | (Netherlands) | April 20, 1993 (aged 24) | 2017 | (Scotland) Dundee United F.C. | 28 | 4 |
| 14 | Asnawi Bahar | (Indonesia) | October 4, 1999 (aged 18) | 2017 | (Indonesia) Persiba Balikpapan | 9 | 0 |
| 17 | Rasyid Bakri | (Indonesia) | January 17, 1991 (aged 26) | 2011 | Youth System | 61 | 11 |
| 18 | Muhammad Arfan | (Indonesia) | January 22, 1998 (aged 19) | 2017 | Youth System | 28 | 0 |
| 19 | Rizky Pellu | (Indonesia) | January 26, 1992 (aged 25) | 2016 | (Indonesia) Mitra Kukar | 67 | 5 |
| 21 | Arsyad Yusgiantoro | (Indonesia) | July 11, 1996 (aged 21) | 2018 | (Indonesia) Persegres Gresik United | 0 | 0 |
| 80 | Wiljan Pluim | (Netherlands) | January 4, 1989 (aged 28) | 2016 | (Vietnam) Becamex Binh Duong FC | 32 | 12 |
| 99 | Saldy | (Indonesia) | March 9, 1995 (aged 22) | 2018 | (Indonesia) Madura United F.C. | 0 | 0 |
Forwards
| 6 | Ferdinand Sinaga | (Indonesia) | September 18, 1988 (aged 29) | 2018 | (Malaysia) Kelantan FA | 57 | 22 |
| 7 | Zulham Zamrun | (Indonesia) | February 19, 1988 (aged 29) | 2017 | (Indonesia) Mitra Kukar | 16 | 5 |
| 11 | Muhammad Rachmat | (Indonesia) | May 28, 1988 (aged 29) | 2008 | | 90 | 27 |
| 13 | Agi Pratama | (Indonesia) | March 17, 1996 (aged 21) | 2018 | (Indonesia) PSS Sleman | 0 | 0 |
| 29 | Sandro | (Hong Kong) | March 10, 1987 (aged 30) | 2018 | (Hong Kong) Kitchee SC | 0 | 0 |
| 39 | Guy Junior Ondoua | (Indonesia) | August 30, 1986 (aged 31) | 2018 | (Brazil) Bhayangkara F.C. | 0 | 0 |
| 94 | Heri Susanto | (Indonesia) | July 15, 1994 (aged 23) | 2018 | (Indonesia) Persiba Balikpapan | 0 | 0 |
