= Stefano Lilipaly =

Indonesian footballer (born 1990)

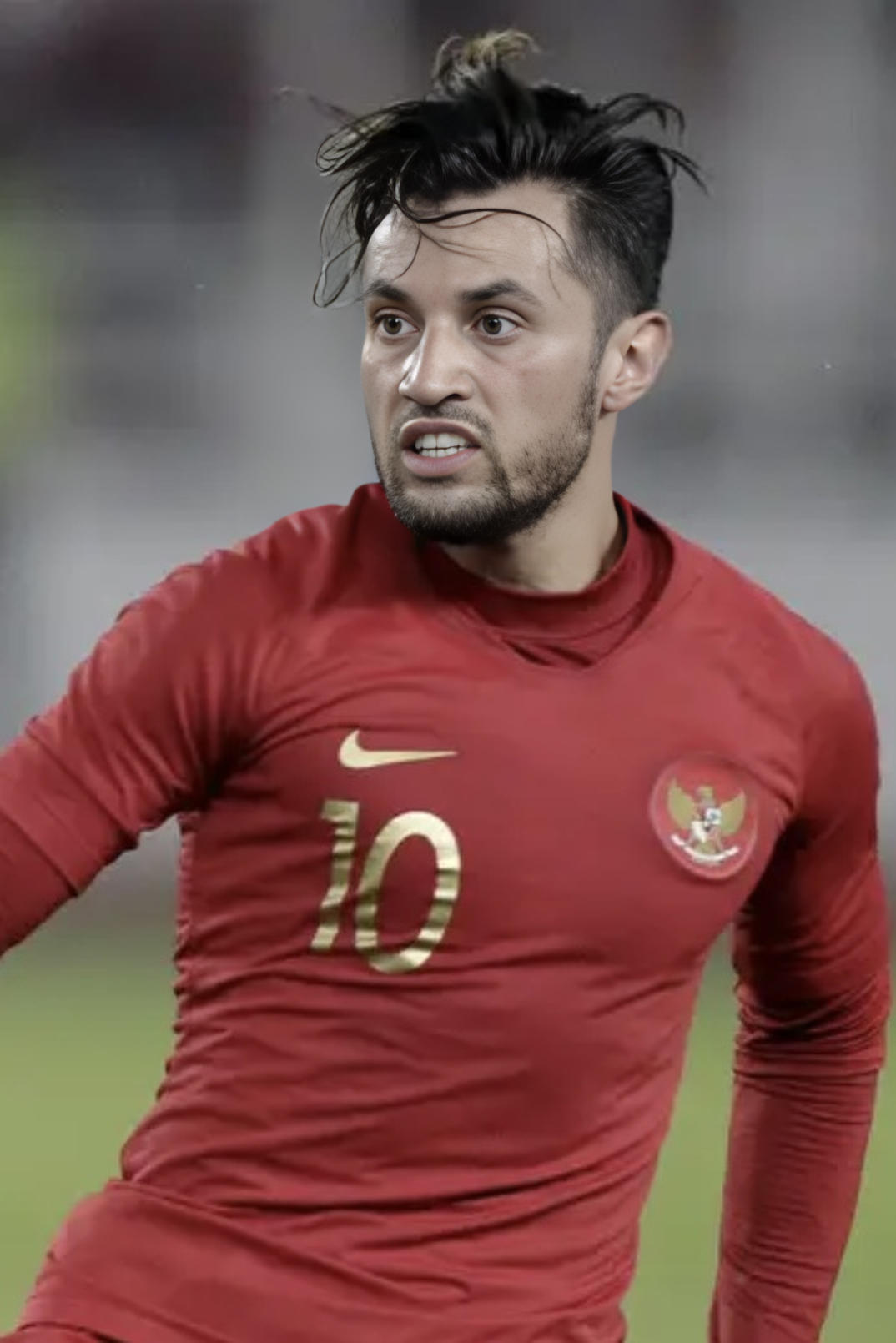
- Lilipaly playing for Indonesia in 2019

Personal information
- Full name: Stefano Jantje Lilipaly
- Date of birth: 10 January 1990 (age 36)
- Place of birth: Amsterdam, Netherlands
- Height: 1.75 m (5 ft 9 in)
- Positions: Winger; attacking midfielder

Team information
- Current team: Semen Padang
- Number: 6

Youth career
- 1997–2000: DCG
- 2000–2001: AZ
- 2001–2010: Utrecht

Senior career*
Years	Team	Apps	(Gls)
2010–2012	Utrecht	5	(1)
2012–2014	Almere City	38	(3)
2014	Consadole Sapporo	0	(0)
2014–2015	Persija Jakarta	0	(0)
2015–2017	Telstar	44	(11)
2017	Cambuur	17	(8)
2017–2022	Bali United	99	(28)
2022–2026	Borneo Samarinda	91	(25)
2025–2026	→ Dewa United Banten (loan)	28	(2)
2026–	Semen Padang	7	(1)

International career^{‡}
2006–2007	Netherlands U17	5	(1)
2018	Indonesia Asian Games (O.P.)	5	(4)
2013–	Indonesia	34	(3)
Medal record
Men's football
Representing Indonesia
AFF Championship
Runner-up	2016 Myanmar & Philippines	Team
- * Club domestic league appearances and goals as of 24 October 2026 ‡ National team caps and goals as of 8 September 2025

Stefano Jantje Lilipaly (born 10 January 1990) is a professional footballer who plays as a winger or an attacking midfielder for Championship club Semen Padang. Born in the Netherlands, he represents the Indonesia national team.

== Club career ==
=== Utrecht ===
Lilipaly played for Dutch amateur side RKSV DCG for three years before joining Eredivisie club AZ's academy in 2000. He moved to Utrecht the following year and progressed through their youth system. Lilipaly made his first team debut for Utrecht in a league game at VVV-Venlo in August 2011, and his first appearance in the starting eleven came in January 2012, where he scored the opening goal against PSV. He played five times for Utrecht before joining Eerste Divisie club Almere City on a free transfer in the summer of 2012.

=== Almere City ===
On 21 May 2012, Lilipaly joined Eerste Divise club Almere City on a two-year contract. during the 2012–13 season, Lilipaly helped his team finish 13th in the league with 22 appearances and 2 goals. He left the club at March 2014.

=== Consadole Sapporo ===
On 23 March 2014, Lilipaly signed for Japanese J2 League club, Consadole Sapporo. But with his new club, Lilipaly didn't make a single appearance, then he went back to the Netherlands.

=== Telstar ===
He was signed for Telstar to play in the Eerste Divisie. Lilipaly made his debut on 28 August 2015 in a match against Emmen, and Lilipaly scored his first goal for Telstar in the 68th minute against Emmen at the Sportpark Schoonenberg.

=== SC Cambuur ===
In January 2017 he joined and signed a contract with Cambuur. and he made his debut as late substitute against FC Utrecht in 2016–17 KNVB Cup. He made his first goal against Helmond Sport, 3 February 2017. At this match Lilipaly made 2 assists at 3–0 won against Helmond Sports. He left the club at August 2017 and move to Indonesia.

=== Bali United ===
==== 2017 season ====
On 12 August 2017, he signed a contract with Indonesian Liga 1 club Bali United to play in 2017 Liga 1. On 13 August 2017, Lilipaly made his league debut for the club in a match against Madura United, coming on as a substitute for I Made Andhika Wijaya in the 78th minute. On 8 October 2017, Lilipaly made his first goal for the club with scored a brace in Liga 1, earning them a 6–1 win over Arema. On 16 October 2017, he scored in a 3–2 away lose over Persiba Balikpapan. On 6 November 2017, Lilipaly scored the only goal in the 95th minute, and it was the winner against PSM Makassar. He finished his first season in 2017 with 4 goals in 15 games.

==== 2018 season ====
On 27 February 2018, he made his Asian debut for the club, coming on as a starter in a 2018 AFC Cup match against Philippines club Global in a 1–1 away draw. On 7 March 2018, Lilipaly scored his first AFC Cup goal for Bali United in the 74th minute of a 3–1 win against V.League 1 club Thanh Hóa. The goal he made was named the best goal in the third week of the 2018 AFC Cup, in a vote conducted by the Asian Football Confederation, Lilipaly's goal received the support of 31.446 voters or 83% of the vote.

On 24 March 2018, Lilipaly scored his first goal of the 2018 season, the opening goal against PSMS Medan in a 1–0 win in the Liga 1. He scored his second league goal for the club on 22 April 2018, opening the scoring in a 2–0 win against PS Barito Putera with a lob over goalkeeper Aditya Harlan. His form in May saw him score three further goals in losses against Sriwijaya (3–4), Mitra Kukar (3–1), and wins against Arema (1–0). Lilipaly finished the season with 12 goals in 22 games.

==== 2019 season ====
On 13 April 2019, Lilipaly scored his first goal of the 2019 season for Bali United in a friendly match against Liga Futebol Timor-Leste club Boavista, which ended in a 4–1 win. On 18 April, he scored a brace for Bali United beat Persija Jakarta 2–1 in the first leg of 2018–19 Piala Indonesia quarter-final. On 26 July, Lilipaly scored his first league goal of the 2019 season, the opening goal against Persib Bandung in a 0–2 away win in the Liga 1. On 15 August, he scored another brace for Bali United in a 1–2 away win against TIRA-Persikabo, with the away win, Bali United is now in first place by collecting 31 points from 13 matches that have been played. Lilipaly scored in second half and give assists an opening goal by Melvin Platje in Bali United's 2–2 draw over Persipura Jayapura on 11 November. Lilipaly scored in second half and give another assists a goal by Ilija Spasojević in Bali United's 3–2 win over Persib Bandung on 28 November.

He had a good season in this season with 30 appearances and 5 goals, while helping Bali United win the championship Liga 1 this season. On 2 December 2019, Bali United won the championship for the first time in their history, becoming the seventh club to win the Liga 1 after second placed Borneo draw to PSM, followed by a win in Semen Padang, giving Bali United a 17-point lead with only four games left.

==== 2020 season ====
On 14 January 2020, Lilipaly scored his first goal of the 2020 season for Bali United in a 2020 AFC Champions League qualifying play-offs against five-time Singapore Premier League champions, Tampines Rovers, Lilipaly and the other new signing Sidik Saimima ensured a 5–3 win and Bali United through to preliminary round 2. On 6 March, Lilipaly scored his first league goal of the 2020 season, the opening goal against PS Barito Putera in a 1–2 away win in the Liga 1. Lilipaly finished the season with only one goal in 2 games, because the league was officially discontinued due to the COVID-19 pandemic.

==== 2021–22 season: Final season with Bali United ====
Lilipaly has been a hot topic of discussion throughout the early part of this year. His contract expired on 31 December 2020. However, when the team started preparations on February 8, Lilipaly did not join. he is shown in training activities around the Jerman beach, Kuta, Bali, with Beto Gonçalves and Demerson. The activity is often uploaded by him through his personal Instagram account, On 12 March 2021, Bali United has finally officially announced the extension of Lilipaly's contract until the end of the season. On 18 September 2021, he started his match in the 2021–22 Liga 1 season for Bali United in a 2–2 draw over Persib Bandung, he coming as a substitute for Yabes Roni in the 85th minute. He played the full 90 minutes in the loss to Bhayangkara on 23 October, where he registered one assist and on 25 November, he played the full 90 minutes in the won to Persija Jakarta.

On 13 January 2022, Lilipaly scored his first league goal of the 2021–22 season, the opening goal against Persib Bandung in a 0–1 win in the Liga 1. His form in February saw him score four further goals in wins against Persikabo 1973 (0–3), Bhayangkara (0–3), Persipura Jayapura (4–1) and draw against PSM Makassar (2–2). On 31 March 2022, he scored in a 1–3 win over Persik Kediri. On 6 May 2021, Lilipaly officially did not renew his contract with Bali United for next season, this was because the team failed to agree on the contract value requested by him, so he chose to leave. He made 119 appearances in five years for Bali United in all competitions, scoring 32 goals making 24 assists and he successfully helped the club to the title for the second time.

=== Borneo Samarinda ===
Lilipaly was signed for Borneo to play in Liga 1 in the 2022–23 season. Lilipaly made his Borneo debut in a pre-season 2022 Indonesia President's Cup against PS Barito Putera on 22 June 2022, he coming as a substitute for Arya Gerryan in the 83rd minute. Three days later, Lilipaly scored his first goal in the 2022 President's Cup for the team in a 1–2 victory over Persija Jakarta at Segiri Stadium. Three days later, Lilipaly scored a brace for the club in a 3–0 win over RANS Nusantara and scored in a 4–0 win over PSS Sleman on 11 July 2022. He has scored a total of 4 goals in this tournament, and also managed to bring the team to the final round, although in the final match lost to Arema.

On 24 July 2022, Lilipaly made his league debut in a 3–0 win over Arema at Segiri Stadium. He scored his first goal for the club on 7 August 2022 in a 4–1 winning match against Persib Bandung at Segiri Stadium. LIlipaly selected as the best player in the third week of the 2022–23 Liga 1. On 9 December, Lilipaly scored a brace in a 2–4 win against PSIS Semarang, the latter result saw Borneo Samarinda move to 3rd position in the league table. On 23 December, Lilipaly scored the opening goal in a 1–1 draw over PSM Makassar, and also scored the opening goal, scoring a penalty in a 3–1 win against Persikabo 1973 on 16 February 2023.

On 20 February 2023, Lilipaly scored the opening goal for the club, scoring a long range in a 1–1 draw with Persita Tangerang at Indomilk Arena. He continued his good form on 8 March with give assists an opening goal by Muhammad Sihran in a 3–1 win over Persija Jakarta, whilst also scored who made it 2–1 in the 80th minute. He then scored a free kick against his former club Bali United on 3 April in the gameweek 32 of Liga 1, in a 5–1 win at Segiri Stadium. He scored a free kick again in a 4–2 home win against RANS Nusantara on 9 April.

On 28 October 2023, Lilipaly scored a hat-trick against Dewa United in a 3–1 win.

== International career ==
Lilipaly represented the Netherlands at youth level, from the under-15s to under-18s. He was eligible to represent the Netherlands or Indonesia at full international level through his parents; his mother being Dutch and his father Indonesian. Lilipaly took the Indonesian citizenship oath in October 2011, to make him officially available for selection. He made his full international debut in August 2013 in a win 2–0 against the Philippines, when he made an assist for Greg Nwokolo.

Lilipaly scored his first international goal for Indonesia in a match against Singapore in the 2016 AFF Championship, which was a late and decisive goal that qualified Indonesia to the semi-finals alongside Thailand. Lilipaly also scored against Vietnam in the second leg semi-finals which sent Indonesia to the finals. He was also called up for the 2018 AFF Championship.

In May 2022, Lilipaly was called up by Shin Tae-yong for a friendly match against Bangladesh, three years since last time playing for the national team. He was called up for the 2023 AFC Asian Cup qualification on Kuwait.

In March 2023, Lilipaly was called up again to the national team for two friendly matches against Burundi, replacing Egy Maulana who was injured.

On 18 May 2025, Lilipaly was called up by Patrick Kluivert to the national team for the matches against China and Japan in the third round of World Cup qualifiers.

== Personal life ==
Born in the Netherlands, Lilipaly represented his country of birth at youth level. Lilipaly made his debut for the Indonesia national team in 2013. His father is Indonesian of Moluccan descent, while his mother is Dutch. The son of Lilipaly plays for AFC Ajax youth academy.

== Career statistics ==
=== Club ===
As of match played 13 September 2026

Club	Season	League			Cup (Note: Includes KNVB Cup, Piala Indonesia)		Continental (Note: Appearances in AFC Champions League) (Note: Appearances in AFC Cup)		Other (Note: Appearances in Indonesia President's Cup)		Total	
Club	Season	Division	Apps	Goals	Apps	Goals	Apps	Goals	Apps	Goals	Apps	Goals
Utrecht	2010–11	Eredivisie	0	0	0	0	—		—		0	0
Utrecht	2011–12	Eredivisie	4	1	0	0	—		—		5	1
Utrecht	Total		4	1	0	0	—		—		4	1
Almere City	2012–13	Eerste Divisie	23	2	1	1	—		—		24	3
Almere City	2013–14	Eerste Divisie	15	1	1	0	—		—		16	1
Almere City	Total		38	3	2	1	—		—		40	4
Consadole Sapporo	2014	J.League Division 2	0	0	0	0	—		—		0	0
Telstar	2015–16	Eerste Divisie	30	7	2	0	—		—		32	7
Telstar	2016–17	Eerste Divisie	14	4	1	0	—		—		15	4
Telstar	Total		44	11	3	0	—		—		47	11
Cambuur	2016–17	Eerste Divisie	17	8	2	0	—		—		19	8
Bali United	2017	Liga 1	15	4	0	0	—		—		15	4
Bali United	2018	Liga 1	22	12	0	0	7	1	6	5	35	18
Bali United	2019	Liga 1	30	5	4	2	—		0	0	34	7
Bali United	2020	Liga 1	2	1	0	0	4	1	—		6	2
Bali United	2021–22	Liga 1	30	6	0	0	—		4 (Note: Appearances in Menpora Cup)	0	34	6
Bali United	Total		99	28	4	2	11	2	10	5	124	37
Borneo Samarinda	2022–23	Liga 1	32	8	0	0	—		8	4	40	12
Borneo Samarinda	2023–24	Liga 1	35	11	0	0	—		0	0	35	11
Borneo Samarinda	2024–25	Liga 1	24	6	0	0	4 (Note: Appearances in ASEAN Club Championship)	0	5	0	33	6
Borneo Samarinda	Total		91	25	0	0	4	0	13	4	108	29
Dewa United Banten (loan)	2025–26	Super League	28	2	0	0	4 (Note: Appearances in AFC Challenge League)	0	0	0	32	2
Semen Padang	2026–27	Championship	7	1	0	0	0	0	0	0	1	0
Career total			322	78	11	3	17	2	23	9	375	92

=== International ===
As of match played 8 September 2025

Appearances and goals by national team and year
National team	Year	Apps	Goals
Indonesia	2013	1	0
Indonesia	2016	8	2
Indonesia	2017	3	0
Indonesia	2018	7	1
Indonesia	2019	5	0
Indonesia	2022	3	0
Indonesia	2023	3	0
Indonesia	2025	4	0
Total		34	3

As of match played 8 September 2023
Scores and results list Indonesia's goal tally first, score column indicates score after each Lilipaly goal.

List of international goals scored by Stefano Lilipaly
No.	Date	Venue	Cap	Opponent	Score	Result	Competition
1	25 November 2016	Rizal Memorial Stadium, Manila, Philippines	5	Singapore	2–1	2–1	2016 AFF Championship
2	7 December 2016	Mỹ Đình National Stadium, Hanoi, Vietnam	7	Vietnam	1–0	2–2 (a.e.t.)	2016 AFF Championship
3	13 November 2018	Gelora Bung Karno Stadium, Jakarta, Indonesia	17	Timor-Leste	2–1	3–1	2018 AFF Championship

== Honours ==
Jong Utrecht

- KNVB Reserve Cup: 2009–10

Bali United

- Liga 1: 2019, 2021–22
- Piala Presiden runner-up: 2018

Borneo Samarinda

- Liga 1 Regular Series: 2023–24
- Piala Presiden runner-up: 2022, 2024

Indonesia

- AFF Championship runner-up: 2016

Individual

- AFF Championship Best XI: 2016
- ASEAN Football Federation Best XI: 2017
- Liga 1 Player of the Month: August 2022, July 2023, September 2023, February 2024
- Liga 1 Team of the Season: 2022–23, 2023–24
- APPI Indonesian Football Award Best Footballer: 2023–24
- APPI Indonesian Football Award Best XI: 2023–24

== See also ==
- List of Indonesia international footballers born outside Indonesia
