= Hendra Wijaya =

Hendra Wijaya may refer to:

- Hendra Wijaya (footballer)
- Hendra Wijaya (badminton)
