= Anan Lestaluhu =

Indonesian footballer

Personal information
- Full name: Anan Mirgaf Lestaluhu
- Date of birth: 22 September 1999 (age 27)
- Place of birth: Tulehu, Indonesia
- Height: 1.72 m (5 ft 8 in)
- Position: Left-back

Youth career
- 2017: Persija Jakarta

Senior career*
Years	Team	Apps	(Gls)
2018–2019	Persija	4	(0)
2019–2020	Bali United	2	(0)
2021–2023	RANS Nusantara	5	(0)
2022–2023	→ Bekasi City (loan)	3	(0)
2023	Persipa Pati	4	(0)
2023–2024	PSKC Cimahi	10	(1)
2024–2025	Dejan	11	(0)
- * Club domestic league appearances and goals as of 10 February 2025

Anan Mirgaf Lestaluhu (born 22 September 1999) is an Indonesian professional footballer who plays as a left-back.

== Career ==
=== Persija ===
Anan got his official professional debut when he played as a starter against PSIS to replace Rezaldi Hehanusa. He played 65 minutes before being substituted with Michael Orah.

=== Bali United ===
On 21 May 2019, Anan officially signed a two-year contract with Bali United, as a part of swap transfer with Feby Eka Putra went to Persija. Bali United registered him for 2019 Liga 1 to completes the quota of U-23 players.

He resigned from Bali United on 4 August 2020 because he will take the test to become a police.

=== RANS Cilegon ===
In 2021, Anan signed a contract with Indonesian Liga 2 club RANS Cilegon. He made his league debut on 28 September against Dewa United at the Gelora Bung Karno Madya Stadium, Jakarta.

== Honours ==
=== Club ===
Persija Jakarta

- Liga 1: 2018

Bali United

- Liga 1: 2019

RANS Cilegon

- Liga 2 runner-up: 2021
