= Sidik Saimima =

Indonesian association football player

Personal information
- Full name: Mohammad Sidik Saimima
- Date of birth: 4 June 1997 (age 29)
- Place of birth: Tulehu, Indonesia
- Height: 1.65 m (5 ft 5 in)
- Position: Midfielder

Team information
- Current team: Garudayaksa
- Number: 77

Youth career
- 2011–2012: SSB Maehanu
- 2013–2014: Perseba Bangkalan
- 2015: Laga FC

Senior career*
Years	Team	Apps	(Gls)
2015–2016	Cilegon United	10	(0)
2016–2017	Gresik United	14	(0)
2017–2018	Persebaya Surabaya	24	(2)
2018	Perseru Serui	11	(2)
2019	PSS Sleman	18	(1)
2020–2025	Bali United	53	(0)
2025–2026	Persis Solo	7	(0)
2026	→ Garudayaksa (loan)	12	(0)
2026–	Garudayaksa	0	(0)
- * Club domestic league appearances and goals as of 9 May 2026

Mohammad Sidik Saimima (born 4 June 1997), is an Indonesian professional footballer who plays as a midfielder for Super League club Garudayaksa.

== Club career ==
=== PSS Sleman ===
In 2019, Saimima signed a contract with Indonesian Liga 1 club PSS Sleman. He made his debut on 31 May 2019 in a match against Persipura Jayapura. On 13 September 2019, Saimima scored his first goal for PSS against Semen Padang in the 83rd minute at the Gelora Haji Agus Salim Stadium, Padang.

=== Bali United ===
On 6 January 2020, fellow Liga 1 club Bali United announced the signing of Saimima. The season however, was suspended on 27 March 2020 due to the COVID-19 pandemic in Indonesia. The season was abandoned and was declared void on 20 January 2021.

=== Persis Solo ===
On 29 June 2025, Saimima officially signed with Persis Solo.

== Career statistics ==
=== Club ===
As of match played 9 May 2026

Club	Season	League			Cup (Note: Includes Piala Indonesia.)		Continental (Note: Includes AFC Cup and AFC Champions League.)		Other		Total	
Club	Season	Division	Apps	Goals	Apps	Goals	Apps	Goals	Apps	Goals	Apps	Goals
Cilegon United	2016	ISC B	10	0	0	0	0	0	0	0	10	0
Persegres Gresik	2016	ISC A	14	0	0	0	0	0	0	0	14	0
Persebaya Surabaya	2017	Liga 2	16	1	0	0	0	0	0	0	16	1
Persebaya Surabaya	2018	Liga 1	8	1	0	0	0	0	0	0	8	1
Persebaya Surabaya	Total		24	2	0	0	0	0	0	0	24	2
Perseru Serui	2018	Liga 1	11	2	0	0	0	0	0	0	11	2
PSS Sleman	2019	Liga 1	18	1	1	1	0	0	0	0	19	2
Bali United	2020	Liga 1	1	0	0	0	4	1	0	0	5	1
Bali United	2021–22	Liga 1	16	0	0	0	0	0	0	0	16	0
Bali United	2022–23	Liga 1	7	0	0	0	0	0	0	0	7	0
Bali United	2023–24	Liga 1	13	0	0	0	1	0	0	0	14	0
Bali United	2024–25	Liga 1	16	0	0	0	0	0	0	0	16	0
Bali United	Total		53	0	0	0	5	1	0	0	58	1
Persis Solo	2025–26	Super League	7	0	0	0	–		0	0	7	0
Garudayaksa (loan)	2025–26	Champhionship	12	0	0	0	–		0	0	12	0
Career total			149	5	1	1	5	1	0	0	155	7

== Honours ==
Persebaya Surabaya

- Liga 2: 2017

Bali United

- Liga 1: 2021–22

Garudayaksa

- Championship: 2025–26
