= 2022 ASEAN Club Championship =

Third edition of the ASEAN Club Championship

Tournament details
- Dates: Cancelled
- Teams: Competition proper: 12; Total: 15 (from 11 associations)

The 2022 ASEAN Club Championship (simply 2022 ACC) was planned to be the third edition of the ASEAN Club Championship, an international association football competition between domestic champion clubs sides affiliated with the member associations of the ASEAN Football Federation. The tournament was initially scheduled to take place in 2020 but was postponed due to the COVID-19 pandemic. In 2022 the tournament was postponed and later cancelled due to the ongoing pandemic and the rescheduling of other 2021 competitions (including the 2020 AFF Championship). The tournament was officially cancelled due to the ongoing pandemic.

It was to be the first ASEAN Club Championship since 2005. Twelve clubs were planned to feature in the competition proper, with prize money for the winners set at about US$500,000.

== Association team allocation ==
Clubs from the following 11 football associations initially entered the competition:

Football association	Group stage	Playoff
Brunei	—	1
Cambodia	—	1
Indonesia	2	—
Laos	—	1
Malaysia	2	—
Myanmar	1	—
Philippines	—	1
Singapore	1	—
Thailand	2	—
Timor-Leste	—	1
Vietnam	2	—

== Teams ==
The following 12 teams from 9 associations confirmed their participation in the competition. Malaysia had direct two berths to the group stage. Brunei's Indera were Brunei's representative at the 2020 AFC Cup, as the only club in the league which fulfilled the AFC Club License requirements. Timor Leste also has not confirmed its participation.

Location of the 2022 ASEAN Club Championship clubs

Group stage direct entrants
Team	Previous league/cup performance	App (Last)
(Thailand) Chiangrai United	2019 Thai League 1 champions	1st
(Thailand) PT Prachuap	2019 Thai League Cup champions	1st
(Vietnam) Hanoi	2019 V.League 1 champions	1st
(Vietnam) Ho Chi Minh City	2019 V.League 1 runners-up	1st
(Indonesia) Bali United	2019 Liga 1 champions	1st
(Indonesia) Persebaya	2019 Liga 1 runners-up	1st
(Singapore) Tampines Rovers	2019 Singapore Premier League runners-up	2nd (2005)
(Myanmar) Shan United	2019 Myanmar National League champions	1st

Qualifying play-off participants: Entering in Group stage
Team	Previous league/cup performance	App (Last)
(Philippines) United City	2019 Philippines Football League champions	1st
(Cambodia) Svay Rieng	2019 C-League champions	1st
(Laos) Chanthabouly	2019 Lao Premier League champions	1st
(Brunei) Indera	2018–19 Brunei Super League 4th place	1st

== See also ==
- AFF Championship
