= Reza Irfana =

Indonesian footballer

Personal information
- Full name: Reza Irfana
- Date of birth: 9 July 1999 (age 27)
- Place of birth: Pati, Indonesia
- Height: 1.76 m (5 ft 9 in)
- Position: Midfielder

Team information
- Current team: Perseden Denpasar
- Number: 16

Youth career
- 2015–2016: SSB Terang Bangsa
- 2016–2017: PSIS Semarang
- 2017–2019: Bali United U19

Senior career*
Years	Team	Apps	(Gls)
2018	Persipa Pati	0	(0)
2019–2021	Bali United	0	(0)
2021–2023	PSIS Semarang	30	(0)
2023–2024	Persikabo 1973	12	(0)
2024–2025	Persibo Bojonegoro	11	(0)
2025–	Perseden Denpasar	5	(0)
- * Club domestic league appearances and goals as of 9 January 2026

Reza Irfana (born 9 July 1999) is an Indonesian professional footballer who plays as a midfielder for Liga Nusantara club Perseden Denpasar.

== Club career ==
=== PSIS Semarang ===
He was signed for PSIS Semarang to play in Liga 1 in the 2021 season. Irfana made his league debut on 12 September 2021 in a match against Persija Jakarta at the Indomilk Arena, Tangerang.

=== Persikabo 1973 ===
Irfana was signed for Persikabo 1973 to play in Liga 1 in the 2023–24 season. He made his debut on 3 July 2023 in a match against RANS Nusantara at the Maguwoharjo Stadium, Sleman.

== Career statistics ==
=== Club ===
As of 9 January 2026

Club	Season	League		Cup		Continental		Other		Total	
Club	Season	Apps	Goals	Apps	Goals	Apps	Goals	Apps	Goals	Apps	Goals
Bali United	2019	0	0	0	0	0	0	0	0	0	0
Bali United	2020	0	0	0	0	0	0	0	0	0	0
PSIS Semarang	2021–22	18	0	0	0	0	0	0	0	18	0
PSIS Semarang	2022–23	12	0	0	0	0	0	2 (Note: Appearances in Indonesia President's Cup)	0	14	0
PSIS Semarang	Total	30	0	0	0	0	0	2	0	32	0
Persikabo 1973	2023–24	12	0	0	0	0	0	0	0	12	0
Persibo Bojonegoro	2024–25	11	0	0	0	0	0	0	0	11	0
Perseden Denpasar	2025–26	5	0	0	0	0	0	0	0	5	0
Career total		58	0	0	0	0	0	2	0	60	0
