= Aldino Herdianto =

Indonesian footballer

Personal information
- Full name: Aldino Herdianto
- Date of birth: 1 November 1988 (age 37)
- Place of birth: Binjai, Indonesia
- Height: 1.72 m (5 ft 8 in)
- Position: Forward

Senior career*
Years	Team	Apps	(Gls)
2014–2015	PSGL Gayo Lues	18	(9)
2015	PSMS Medan	13	(3)
2015–2016	PS TNI	30	(8)
2017–2018	Mitra Kukar	20	(6)
2019	PSMS Medan	6	(1)
2019	Bali United	4	(1)
2020	Badak Lampung	1	(0)
2021	Semen Padang	5	(0)
2022–2024	Serpong City	16	(19)
- * Club domestic league appearances and goals as of 8 May 2024

Aldino Herdianto (born 1 November 1988 in Binjai, Indonesia) is an Indonesian professional footballer who plays as a forward.

== Club career ==
=== PSMS Medan ===
In 2015, Aldino joined PSMS Medan in 2015 Piala Kemerdekaan, In a match against Persinga Ngawi, he scored in 61st minute. Score 1–1 for PSMS Medan. When in injury time of second half, Legimin Raharjo scored for PSMS Medan, 2–1 for PSMS. With this result, PSMS became champion in Piala Kemerdekaan

=== PS TNI ===
Aldino made his debut against Madura United F.C. in the first week 2016 Indonesia Soccer Championship A although only as a substitute.

And in this competition, he has scored as many as 8 goals

=== Mitra Kukar ===
In 2017, Aldino join Mitra Kukar along with teammate, Wiganda Pradika. He made his debut on 15 April 2017 in a match against Barito Putera. On 1 June 2018, Aldino scored his first goal for Mitra Kukar against Perseru Serui in the 51st minute at the Aji Imbut Stadium, Tenggarong.

=== PSMS Medan ===
In 2019, Aldino signed a contract with Indonesian Liga 2 club PSMS Medan.

=== Bali United ===
He was signed for Bali United to play in Liga 1 in the 2019 middle season. Aldino made his debut on 18 October 2019 in a match against Borneo. On 16 December 2019, Aldino scored his first goal for Bali United against Arema in the 14th minute at the Kanjuruhan Stadium, Malang.

=== Badak Lampung ===
In 2020, Aldino signed a contract with Indonesian Liga 2 club Badak Lampung. This season was suspended on 27 March 2020 due to the COVID-19 pandemic. The season was abandoned and was declared void on 20 January 2021.

=== Semen Padang ===
In 2021, Aldino signed a contract with Indonesian Liga 2 club Semen Padang. He made his league debut on 6 October against PSPS Riau at the Gelora Sriwijaya Stadium, Palembang.

== Club honours ==
PSMS Medan

- Piala Kemerdekaan: 2015

Bali United

- Liga 1: 2019

Serpong City

- Liga 3: 2022
