= Syaiful Syamsuddin =

Indonesian footballer

Personal information
- Full name: Syaiful Syamsuddin
- Date of birth: 11 June 1993 (age 33)
- Place of birth: Takalar, Indonesia
- Height: 1.75 m (5 ft 9 in)
- Position: Goalkeeper

Team information
- Current team: PSM Makassar
- Number: 51

Senior career*
Years	Team	Apps	(Gls)
2016–2019	PSM Makassar	31	(0)
2019	Persita Tangerang	10	(0)
2019	Barito Putera	0	(0)
2020–2022	PSM Makassar	11	(0)
2022–2023	Dewa United	4	(0)
2023	PSIS Semarang	1	(0)
2023–2024	Persiba Balikpapan	0	(0)
2024–2025	PSKC Cimahi	1	(0)
2026	PSM Makassar	0	(0)
- * Club domestic league appearances and goals as of 7 February 2025

Syaiful Syamsuddin (born 11 June 1993) is an Indonesian professional footballer who plays as a goalkeeper for Liga 1 club PSM Makassar.
