= Fahmi Al-Ayyubi =

Indonesian footballer

Personal information
- Full name: Mohammad Fahmi Al-Ayyubi
- Date of birth: 21 December 1995 (age 30)
- Place of birth: Pasuruan, Indonesia
- Height: 1.72 m (5 ft 7 1/2 in)
- Position: Winger

Youth career
- –2012: Indonesian Football Academy
- 2012–2013: Laga FC
- 2013–2014: Perseba Bangkalan
- 2015–2016: Persela Lamongan

Senior career*
Years	Team	Apps	(Gls)
2017–2019	Persela Lamongan	48	(10)
2019–2022	Bali United	33	(0)
2022	→ Persik Kediri (loan)	14	(0)
2022–2023	Dewa United	13	(0)
2023–2024	Persijap Jepara	7	(2)
2024–2025	Gresik United	13	(0)
2026	PSIS Semarang	4	(0)

International career
2014	Indonesia U19	2	(0)
- * Club domestic league appearances and goals as of 25 April 2026

Mohammad Fahmi Al-Ayyubi (born 21 December 1995) is an Indonesian professional footballer who plays as a winger.

== Club career ==
=== Persela Lamongan ===
He made his professional debut in the Liga 1 on 16 April 2017 against PSM Makassar. Fahmi made his debut on 21 April 2017 in a match against Madura United. On 21 April 2017, Fahmi scored his first goal for Persela against Madura United in the 38th minute at the Surajaya Stadium, Lamongan.

=== Bali United ===
He was signed for Bali United to play in Liga 1 in the 2019 season. Fahmi made his debut on 16 May 2019 in a match against Persebaya Surabaya at the Kapten I Wayan Dipta Stadium, Gianyar. On 2 December 2019, Bali United won the championship for the first time in their history, becoming the seventh club to win the Liga 1 after second placed Borneo draw to PSM, followed by a win in Semen Padang, giving Bali United a 17-point lead with only four games left.

==== Persik Kediri (loan) ====
In 2022, Fahmi signed a contract with Indonesian Liga 1 club Persik Kediri, on loan from Bali United. He made his league debut on 8 January 2022 in a match against Borneo at the Kapten I Wayan Dipta Stadium, Gianyar.

=== Dewa United ===
On 3 June 2022, Al-Ayyubi signed a contract for Dewa United. He made his league debut on 25 July 2022 in a match against Persis Solo at the Moch. Soebroto Stadium, Magelang.

== International career ==
In 2014, Fahmi represented the Indonesia U-19, in the 2014 AFF U-19 Youth Championship.

== Career statistics ==
=== Club ===
As of match played 25 April 2026

Club	Season	League			Cup		Continental (Note: Appearances in AFC Cup)		Other		Total	
Club	Season	Division	Apps	Goals	Apps	Goals	Apps	Goals	Apps	Goals	Apps	Goals
Persela Lamongan	2017	Liga 1	20	4	0	0	0	0	0	0	20	4
Persela Lamongan	2018	Liga 1	28	6	0	0	0	0	0	0	28	6
Persela Lamongan	Total		48	10	0	0	0	0	0	0	48	10
Bali United	2019	Liga 1	23	0	0	0	0	0	0	0	23	0
Bali United	2020	Liga 1	2	0	0	0	2	0	0	0	4	0
Bali United	2021–22	Liga 1	8	0	0	0	0	0	0	0	8	0
Bali United	Total		33	0	0	0	2	0	0	0	35	0
Persik Kediri (loan)	2021–22	Liga 1	14	0	0	0	0	0	0	0	14	0
Dewa United	2022–23	Liga 1	13	0	0	0	0	0	4 (Note: Appearances in Indonesia President's Cup)	0	17	0
Persijap Jepara	2023–24	Liga 2	7	2	0	0	0	0	0	0	7	2
Gresik United	2024–25	Liga 2	13	0	0	0	0	0	0	0	13	0
PSIS Semarang	2025–26	Championship	4	0	0	0	0	0	0	0	4	0
Career total			132	12	0	0	2	0	4	0	138	12

== Honours ==
=== Club ===
Bali United

- Liga 1: 2019
