= Hendra Wijaya (footballer) =

Indonesian footballer

Personal information
- Full name: Hendra Wijaya
- Date of birth: 4 August 1989 (age 37)
- Place of birth: Sungguminasa, Indonesia
- Height: 5 ft 8 in (1.72 m)
- Position: Defender

Team information
- Current team: PSIM Yogyakarta
- Number: 2

Youth career
- 2008–2009: PSM Makassar

Senior career*
Years	Team	Apps	(Gls)
2009–2020	PSM Makassar	60	(0)
2019	→ PSIM Yogyakarta (loan)	8	(0)
2020	PSIM Yogyakarta	1	(0)
2021	PSM Makassar	0	(0)
2021	RANS Cilegon	10	(0)
2022	Bekasi City	5	(0)
2023–	PSIM Yogyakarta	5	(0)
- * Club domestic league appearances and goals as of 18 December 2023

Hendra Wijaya (born 4 August 1989) is an Indonesian professional footballer who plays as a defender for Liga 2 club PSIM Yogyakarta.

== Honours ==
=== Club ===
PSM Makassar

- Piala Indonesia: 2019

RANS Cilegon

- Liga 2 runner-up: 2021
