= Wasyiat Hasbullah =

Indonesian footballer

Personal information
- Full name: Wasyiat Hasbullah
- Date of birth: October 25, 1994 (age 32)
- Place of birth: Pallangga, Gowa, Indonesia
- Height: 1.73 m (5 ft 8 in)
- Position: Right back

Senior career*
Years	Team	Apps	(Gls)
2016–2018	PSM Makassar	42	(0)
2019	Kalteng Putra	26	(1)
2020	PSM Makassar	0	(0)
- * Club domestic league appearances and goals as of 08.47, 27 November 2019 (UTC)

Wasyiat Hasbullah (born October 25, 1994) is an Indonesian professional footballer who plays as a right back.

== Club career ==
=== PSM Makassar ===
He was signed for PSM Makassar to play in Indonesia Soccer Championship A in the 2016 season.

=== Kalteng Putra ===
In 2019, Wasyiat signed a one-year contract with Indonesian Liga 1 club Kalteng Putra.

=== Return to PSM Makassar ===
In 2020, it was confirmed that Wasyiat would re-join PSM Makassar, signing a year contract. This season was suspended on 27 March 2020 due to the COVID-19 pandemic. The season was abandoned and was declared void on 20 January 2021.

== Career statistics ==
=== Club ===
As of match played 18 April 2021

Club	Season	League			Cup (Note: Includes Piala Indonesia)		Continental		Other (Note: Appearances in Indonesia President's Cup)		Total	
Club	Season	Division	Apps	Goals	Apps	Goals	Apps	Goals	Apps	Goals	Apps	Goals
PSM Makassar	2016	ISC A	22	0	0	0	–		0	0	22	0
PSM Makassar	2017	Liga 1	15	0	0	0	–		1	0	15	0
PSM Makassar	2018	Liga 1	5	0	0	0	–		2	0	7	0
Kalteng Putra	2019	Liga 1	26	1	0	0	–		6	0	33	1
PSM Makassar	2020	Liga 1	0	0	0	0	1 (Note: Appearances in AFC Cup)	0	0	0	1	0
PSM Makassar	2021	Liga 1	0	0	0	0	–		0	0	0	0
Career total			68	1	0	0	1	0	9	0	78	1
