= Samuel Reimas =

Indonesian footballer

Personal information
- Full name: Samuel Charlheins Reimas
- Date of birth: 19 September 1992 (age 34)
- Place of birth: Sorong, Indonesia
- Height: 1.76 m (5 ft 9 in)
- Position: Goalkeeper

Team information
- Current team: Deltras
- Number: 29

Youth career
- Forester Kab. Sorong
- Sawiat FC Kota Sorong
- SSB Sosisal Surabaya

Senior career*
Years	Team	Apps	(Gls)
2017	Persebaya Surabaya	1	(0)
2018	Perseru Serui	25	(0)
2019–2022	Bali United	3	(0)
2022	Semen Padang	5	(0)
2023–2025	Persela Lamongan	24	(0)
2025–2026	Persipura Jayapura	1	(0)
2026–	Deltras	1	(0)
- * Club domestic league appearances and goals as of 22:34, 13 September 2026 (UTC)

Samuel Charlheins Reimas (born 19 September 1992) is an Indonesian professional footballer who plays as a goalkeeper for Championship club Deltras.

== Club career ==
=== Perseru Serui ===
On 22 January 2018, Perseru signed Reimas from newly promoted club, Persebaya. Reimas had 25 appearances with Perseru in 2018 season and recorded 10 clean sheets. He had a saves record in 2018 with 84, tied with Wawan Hendrawan and only lost to Teja Paku Alam.

=== Bali United ===
On 13 January 2019, Reimas officially signed a two-year contract with Bali United. He made his debut on 8 December 2019 in a match against Persipura Jayapura at the Kapten I Wayan Dipta Stadium, Gianyar.

=== Semen Padang ===
Reimas was signed for Semen Padang to play in Liga 2 in the 2022–23 season. He made his league debut on 29 August 2022 in a match against PSPS Riau at the Riau Main Stadium, Riau.

== Honours ==
=== Club ===
Bali United

- Liga 1: 2019, 2021–22
