= Yabes Roni =

Indonesian footballer

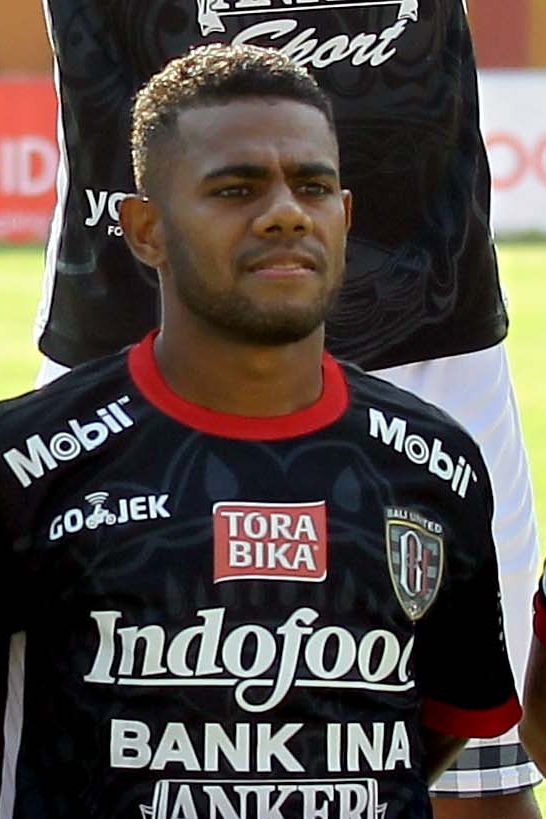
- Yabes playing for Bali United in 2017

Personal information
- Full name: Yabes Roni Malaifani
- Date of birth: 6 February 1995 (age 31)
- Place of birth: Alor, Indonesia
- Height: 1.68 m (5 ft 6 in)
- Position: Winger

Team information
- Current team: Java United
- Number: 11

Youth career
- 2011: PS KDP
- 2013–2014: Persap Alor

Senior career*
Years	Team	Apps	(Gls)
2015–2026	Bali United	146	(9)
2026	→ Persis Solo (loan)	6	(0)
2026–	Java United	1	(0)

International career
2013–2014	Indonesia U19	9	(1)
2017	Indonesia U23	7	(0)
2017–2021	Indonesia	6	(0)
Medal record
Men's football
Representing Indonesia
Southeast Asian Games
Bronze medal – third place	2017 Kuala Lumpur	Team
AFF Championship
Runner-up	2020 Singapore	Team
- * Club domestic league appearances and goals as of 6 September 2026

Yabes Roni Malaifani (born 6 February 1995) is an Indonesian professional footballer who plays as a winger for Super League club Java United.

== Early life ==
Born in Alor Moro February 6, 1995, Yabes had to travel using public transportation for 1 hour to hone his football ability. Although only joined hometown club, but the spirit of the eldest of the two brothers never fades. Yabes himself admitted that his talent was first discovered by the coach, Indra Sjafri in mid-June 2013 ago. At that time, Indra Sjafri was around Indonesia looking for players to be plotted strengthen Indonesia in the AFF U-19 Youth Championship and AFC U-19 Championship.

Indra then opened the selection process in Kupang, East Nusa Tenggara (NTT). Hearing the news, Yabes who was then only 18 years old decided to fly to the location selection.

== Club career ==
=== Early career ===
Yabes started playing football since the age of 6. He has played for hometown club PS KDP and Persap Alor. During his time in Persap Alor, his talent was spotted by Indonesia U-19 head coach Indra Sjafri, subsequently Indra called him for the national team.

=== Bali United ===
In 2015, Yabes joined newly rebranded club, Bali United, this move would saw him sign his first professional contract as well as being reunited with former national coach, Indra Sjafri. Yabes made his club debut in 2016 season on 1 May 2016 in a match against Pusamania Borneo in a 1–1 draw. and on 26 August 2016, he scored his first league goal for the team in 2016 season, scoring in a 2–1 win against Persija Jakarta.

==== 2017–2019 ====
Yabes made his debut in 2017 season on 8 April 2017 in a friendly match against Persib Bandung in a 1–2 win, he also scored his first goal for the team in this match, where he scored in the 68th minutes. Four minutes later, he was involved in an incident with Ghanaian international, Michael Essien. This incident started when he accidentally kicked the ball at him, Displeased with his actions, Essien tried to chase him. Unfortunately for him, Yabes was given a yellow card by the referee and it was his second yellow card so he had to leave the field.

On 16 April 2017, Yabes made his official league debut in a Liga 1 match against Madura United in a 2–0 away lose. On 14 May 2017, Yabes scored his first league goal for Bali United with scored a brace, where he scored in the 23rd and 70th minutes, final result, Bali United win 3–0 over Borneo.

On 21 May 2019, he scored the opening goal as well as the decisive goal for Bali United in a 1–0 win over Bhayangkara. On 31 December 2019, Yabes extended his contract with the club along with Muhammad Taufiq.

==== 2020–present ====
On 1 March 2020, he started his match in the 2020 Liga 1 season for Bali United, playing as a substituted in a 0–0 draw over Persita Tangerang. Yabes only played 2 times for the club because the league was officially discontinued due to the COVID-19 pandemic.

Yabes scored his first goal of the 2021–22 season on 18 September 2021, in a home game against Persib Bandung. The game ended in a 2–2 draw. Yabes ended the 2021–22 season with 11 league appearances and scored one goal.

Yabes give assists goal by Ilija Spasojević in Bali United's 3–2 win over RANS Nusantara on 4 August 2022, as well as being a player included in the Best Starting Eleven 2022–23 Liga 1 game week 3. On 2 September, he made his 100th appearance for the club as Bali United won 1–0 at Persebaya Surabaya, he also contributed by scoring 5 goals and 6 assists while with Bali United.

Yabes scored his first goal of the 2022–23 season on 27 February 2023, in a home game against Persis Solo. The game ended in a 3–1 victory for Bali United. He added his second goals of the season on 27 March against Arema in a 1–3 away win.

== International career ==
He made his international debut for the Indonesia under-19 team in the 2014 AFC U-19 Championship qualifiers and only appeared as a substitute in the 70th minute, replacing Dinan Yahdian Javier. He could have scored a goal in the 85th minute after a pass from Paulo Sitanggang. However, Indonesia won 2–0.

He made his international debut for the senior team on 8 June 2017 against Cambodia.

== Personal life ==
He is a graduate of Yogyakarta State University (UNY), the Faculty of Sports Science with a concentration in sports coaching education.

== Career statistics ==
=== Club ===
As of match played 6 September 2026

Club	Season	League			Cup (Note: Includes Piala Indonesia.)		Continental (Note: Appearances in AFC Champions League and AFC Cup.)		Other		Total	
Club	Season	Division	Apps	Goals	Apps	Goals	Apps	Goals	Apps	Goals	Apps	Goals
Bali United	2015	Indonesia Super League	0	0	0	0	0	0	0	0	0	0
Bali United	2016	ISC A	22	1	0	0	0	0	0	0	22	1
Bali United	2017	Liga 1	14	2	0	0	0	0	0	0	14	2
Bali United	2018	Liga 1	12	0	2	0	4	1	0	0	18	1
Bali United	2019	Liga 1	21	1	5	0	0	0	0	0	26	1
Bali United	2020	Liga 1	2	0	0	0	3	0	0	0	5	0
Bali United	2021–22	Liga 1	11	1	0	0	0	0	0	0	11	1
Bali United	2022–23	Liga 1	26	2	0	0	2	0	3 (Note: Appearances in Indonesia President's Cup)	0	31	2
Bali United	2023–24	Liga 1	17	2	0	0	5	0	0	0	22	2
Bali United	2024–25	Liga 1	20	0	0	0	0	0	0	0	20	0
Bali United	2025–26	Super League	1	0	0	0	–		0	0	1	0
Persis Solo (loan)	2025–26	Super League	6	0	0	0	0	0	0	0	6	0
Java United	2026–27	Super League	1	0	0	0	0	0	0	0	1	0
Career total			153	9	7	0	14	1	3	0	177	10

=== International ===
As of match played 22 December 2021

Appearances and goals by national team and year
National team	Year	Apps	Goals
Indonesia	2017	2	0
Indonesia	2018	0	0
Indonesia	2019	0	0
Indonesia	2020	0	0
Indonesia	2021	4	0
Total		6	0

== Honours ==
Bali United

- Liga 1: 2019, 2021–22
- Indonesia President's Cup runner-up: 2018

Indonesia U-23

- SEA Games bronze medal: 2017

Indonesia

- Aceh World Solidarity Cup runner-up: 2017
- AFF Championship runner-up: 2020
