= Wawan Hendrawan =

Indonesian footballer

Personal information
- Full name: Wawan Hendrawan
- Date of birth: 8 January 1983 (age 43)
- Place of birth: Brebes, Indonesia
- Height: 1.78 m (5 ft 10 in)
- Position: Goalkeeper

Senior career*
Years	Team	Apps	(Gls)
2003–2004	Persibas Banyumas	22	(0)
2004–2005	Persikabo Bogor	11	(0)
2005–2006	Persikab Bandung	20	(0)
2007–2008	Pelita Jaya	3	(0)
2008–2009	Persita Tangerang	21	(0)
2009–2011	Persisam Putra	52	(0)
2011–2012	Deltras Sidoarjo	16	(0)
2012–2014	Persiba Balikpapan	46	(0)
2015–2016	Mitra Kukar	0	(0)
2017	Borneo	0	(0)
2017–2022	Bali United	97	(0)
2022–2023	RANS Nusantara	15	(0)
2023–2024	Madura United	13	(0)
2024–2025	Barito Putera	3	(0)

International career
2019	Indonesia	1	(0)
- * Club domestic league appearances and goals as of 22 December 2024

Wawan Hendrawan (born 8 January 1983 in Brebes Regency) is an Indonesian professional footballer who plays as a goalkeeper.

== Club career ==
Wawan has spent a 20-year-long career playing for many Indonesian clubs.

== International career ==
Wawan made his first international appearance in a 2022 FIFA World Cup qualifier against the UAE on 10 October 2019.

== Career statistics ==
=== Club ===
As of 22 December 2024

Club performance			League		Cup (Note: Includes Piala Indonesia.)		Continental		Total	
Season	Club	League	Apps	Goals	Apps	Goals	Apps	Goals	Apps	Goals
2004	Persikabo Bogor	Second Division	?	0	-		-		?	0
2005	Persikabo Bogor	First Division	?	0	?	0	-		?	0
2005	Persikab Bandung	Second Division	?	0	?	0	-		?	0
2006	Persikab Bandung	First Division	?	0	?	0	-		?	0
2007–08	Pelita Jaya	Premier Division	3	0	1	0	-		4	0
2008–09	Persita Tangerang	Super League	21	0	1	0	-		22	0
2009–10	Persisam Putra Samarinda	Super League	25	0	3	0	-		28	0
2010–11	Persisam Putra Samarinda	Super League	27	0	-		-		27	0
2011–12	Deltras	Super League	16	0	-		-		16	0
2013	Persiba Balikpapan	Super League	30	0	0	0	-		30	0
2014	Persiba Balikpapan	Super League	16	0	0	0	-		16	0
2015	Mitra Kukar	Super League	0	0	0	0	-		0	0
2017	Bali United	Liga 1	17	0	0	0	-		17	0
2018	Bali United	Liga 1	30	0	1	0	5 (Note: Appearances in AFC Cup.)	0	36	0
2019	Bali United	Liga 1	31	0	6	0	-		37	0
2020	Bali United	Liga 1	3	0	0	0	2 (Note: Appearances in AFC Champions League.)	0	5	0
2021–22	Bali United	Liga 1	16	0	0	0	0	0	16	0
2022–23	RANS Nusantara	Liga 1	15	0	0	0	-		15	0
2023–24	Madura United	Liga 1	13	0	0	0	-		13	0
2024–25	Barito Putera	Liga 1	3	0	0	0	-		3	0
Career total			266	0	12	0	7	0	285	0

=== International ===
As of 10 October 2019

Appearances and goals by national team and year
National team	Year	Apps	Goals
Indonesia	2019	1	0
Total		1	0

== Honours ==
Pusamania Borneo

- Indonesia President's Cup runner-up: 2017

Bali United

- Liga 1: 2019, 2021–22
- Indonesia President's Cup runner-up: 2018

=== Individual ===
- Liga 1 Team of the Season: 2019
- Indonesian Soccer Awards: Best Goalkepper 2019
- Indonesian Soccer Awards: Best 11 2019
