= Willian Pacheco =

Brazilian footballer

Personal information
- Full name: Willian Silva Costa Pacheco
- Date of birth: 28 March 1992 (age 34)
- Place of birth: São Paulo, Brazil
- Height: 1.97 m (6 ft 6 in)
- Position: Centre-back

Youth career
- 2011: Corinthians
- 2012: Botafogo
- 2012–2013: Sporting Charleroi

Senior career*
Years	Team	Apps	(Gls)
2014	Rio Branco	11	(3)
2015	Iranduba	4	(0)
2016–2017	Persija Jakarta	60	(5)
2017–2019	Selangor	14	(0)
2019–2023	Bali United	71	(10)
- * Club domestic league appearances and goals as of 19 December 2022

Willian Silva Costa Pacheco (born 28 March 1992) is a Brazilian professional footballer who plays as a centre-back.

== Club career ==
=== Persija Jakarta ===
In 2016, Willian signed for Indonesian club, Persija Jakarta, and on 29 April 2016, Willian made his league debut for the club in a 1–1 draw against Persipura Jayapura at Mandala Stadium.

On 13 June 2017, Willian scored his first league goal for the club, the opening goal against Perseru Serui in a 3–0 win in the Liga 1. three days later, Willian scored the only goal in the 2nd minute, and it was the winner against Sriwijaya. He had a good season this season with 30 appearances and 5 goals, while helping Persija Jakarta to rank fourth in the league this season.

=== Selangor F.C. ===
On 4 December 2017, Willian move to Malaysia and signed a one-year contract with Malaysia Super League club Selangor. He made his league debut for Selangor when he was part of the starting lineup of a 2018 Malaysia Super League match against Kuala Lumpur City on 4 February 2018, in which Selangor won. During the 2018 season, Willian helped his team finish 8th in the league with 14 appearances and without goals. He left the club at March 2014. He left the club at the end of the year.

=== Bali United F.C. ===
On 14 January 2019, Willian was signed for Bali United to play in Liga 1 in the 2019 season. He made his league debut on 16 May 2019 in a match against Persebaya Surabaya at the Kapten I Wayan Dipta Stadium, Gianyar Regency. On 26 June 2019, Willian scored his first goal for Bali United, during a 2–2 league draw against Kalteng Putra. He scored his second league goal for the club four days later in a 0–3 away win against Badak Lampung. On 24 August, he scored the opening goal in a 2–1 win over Arema. He had a good season in this season with 24 appearances and 4 goals, while helping Bali United win the championship Liga 1 this season. On 2 December 2019, Bali United won the championship for the first time in their history, becoming the seventh club to win the Liga 1 after second placed Borneo draw to PSM, followed by a win in Semen Padang, giving Bali United a 17-point lead with only four games left.

== Career statistics ==
=== Club ===
As of match played 19 December 2022

Club	Season	League			Cup (Note: Includes Piala Indonesia, Malaysia FA Cup)		Continental (Note: Appearances in AFC Cup.) (Note: Appearances in AFC Champions League.)		Other		Total	
Club	Season	Division	Apps	Goals	Apps	Goals	Apps	Goals	Apps	Goals	Apps	Goals
Persija Jakarta	2016	ISC A	30	0	0	0	0	0	0	0	30	0
Persija Jakarta	2017	Liga 1	30	5	0	0	0	0	0	0	30	5
Persija Jakarta	Total		60	5	0	0	0	0	0	0	60	5
Selangor	2018	Malaysia Super League	14	0	5	1	0	0	0	0	19	1
Bali United	2019	Liga 1	24	4	4	0	0	0	0	0	28	4
Bali United	2020	Liga 1	3	1	0	0	5	0	0	0	8	1
Bali United	2021–22	Liga 1	30	1	0	0	0	0	0	0	30	1
Bali United	2022–23	Liga 1	14	4	0	0	3	0	0	0	17	4
Bali United	Total		85	10	9	1	8	0	0	0	102	11
Career total			145	15	9	1	8	0	0	0	162	16

== Honours ==
=== Club ===
Bali United

- Liga 1: 2019, 2021–22

=== Individual ===
- Liga 1 Best XI: 2017
- APPI Indonesian Football Award Best 11: 2021–22
