= Leonard Tupamahu =

Indonesian footballer

Personal information
- Full name: Leonard Tupamahu
- Date of birth: 9 July 1983 (age 43)
- Place of birth: Jakarta, Indonesia
- Height: 1.79 m (5 ft 10 in)
- Position: Defender

Team information
- Current team: Deltras (head coach)

Youth career
- 2001: Trisakti
- 2003–2005: Universitas Kristen Indonesia

Senior career*
Years	Team	Apps	(Gls)
2002	Persija Jakarta	20	(0)
2003	Persipur Purwodadi	24	(1)
2004	Persikabo Bogor	15	(0)
2004–2009	Persija Jakarta	130	(6)
2010–2011	Arema Cronus	19	(1)
2012–2013	Persema Malang	24	(3)
2013–2014	Pelita Bandung Raya	19	(0)
2014	Persiram Raja Ampat	20	(1)
2015–2016	Barito Putera	3	(0)
2016–2019	Borneo	67	(0)
2019–2023	Bali United	61	(2)
2023–2024	PSS Sleman	19	(0)
Total		421	(14)

International career
2005	Indonesia U23	6	(0)

Managerial career
- 2026: Persiba Balikpapan
- 2026–: Deltras
- * Club domestic league appearances and goals

Leonard Tupamahu (born 9 July 1983) is an Indonesian professional football coach and former player who is currently the head coach at Deltras. During his playing career, he primarily played as a defender.

== Club career ==
He has played for Persija from 2004 until 2009. In 2009, he also played futsal for Biangbola in Indonesian Futsal League. In 2010, he joined Arema Malang. On 12 December 2014, he joined Barito Putera.

== Honours ==
=== Club ===
Bali United

- Liga 1: 2019, 2021–22
