= Gusti Sandria =

Indonesian association footballer

Personal information
- Full name: Gusti Sandria
- Date of birth: 6 August 1995 (age 31)
- Place of birth: Deli Serdang, Indonesia
- Height: 1.69 m (5 ft 7 in)
- Position: Full-back

Youth career
- SSB Lubuk Pakam Bersinar
- 2012–2015: PSDS Deli Serdang

Senior career*
Years	Team	Apps	(Gls)
2016	Bintang Jaya Asahan	9	(3)
2017–2018	PSMS Medan	26	(1)
2019–2021	Bali United	0	(0)
2019–2020	→ Sulut United (loan)	17	(1)
2021	PSMS Medan	0	(0)
2021	PSPS Riau	4	(0)
2022–2023	Persipal Palu	4	(0)
2023–2024	PSDS Deli Serdang	4	(0)
- * Club domestic league appearances and goals as of 13 December 2023

Gusti Sandria (born 6 August 1995) is an Indonesian professional footballer who last played as a full-back for PSDS Deli Serdang.

== Club career ==
Gusti start his junior career with PSDS Deli Serdang then with PS Bintang Jaya Asahan and strengthen the PON Sumut teams in 2016. In 2017, he joined PSMS Medan who competed in Liga 2. He with his club managed to become runner-up 2017 Liga 2 and got promotion to 2018 Liga 1.

== Honours ==
=== Club ===
PSMS Medan

- Liga 2 runner-up: 2017
- Indonesia President's Cup Fourth place: 2018
