= Ahmad Maulana Putra =

Indonesian footballer

Ahmad Maulana
Personal information
- Full name: Ahmad Maulana Putra
- Date of birth: 28 August 1988 (age 38)
- Place of birth: Medan, Indonesia
- Height: 1.83 m (6 ft 0 in)
- Position: Defensive midfielder

Senior career*
| Years | Team | Apps | (Gls) |
| 2008–2010 | PSMS Medan | 40 | (2) |
| 2010–2011 | Persikabo Bogor | 16 | (0) |
| 2011–2012 | Persires Rengat | 18 | (0) |
| 2012–2013 | Deltras Sidoarjo | 12 | (2) |
| 2013–2014 | Persiba Balikpapan | 40 | (2) |
| 2015 | PSM Makassar | 2 | (0) |
| 2016 | Madura United | 26 | (0) |
| 2017 | Sriwijaya | 0 | (0) |
| 2018 | Borneo | 18 | (0) |
| 2019 | Bali United | 0 | (0) |
| 2019 | → Sulut United (loan) | 0 | (0) |
| 2020 | Semen Padang | 2 | (0) |
| 2021 | Persekat Tegal | 0 | (0) |
| 2021 | Hizbul Wathan | 9 | (0) |
| 2022–2023 | PSKC Cimahi | 6 | (0) |
| 2023 | Adhyaksa Farmel | 0 | (0) |
- * Club domestic league appearances and goals as of 1 October 2022

Ahmad Maulana Putra (born 27 July 1988) is an Indonesian professional footballer who plays as a defensive midfielder. He was called The Indonesian Marouane Fellaini by his friends because of his similar hairstyle with that Belgian footballer.

== Club career ==
=== Semen Padang ===
He was signed for Semen Padang to play in Liga 2 in the 2020 season. This season was suspended on 27 March 2020 due to the COVID-19 pandemic. The season was abandoned and was declared void on 20 January 2021.

=== Hizbul Wathan FC ===
In 2021, Ahmad Maulana signed a contract with Indonesian Liga 2 club Hizbul Wathan. He made his league debut on 27 September against Persijap Jepara at the Manahan Stadium, Surakarta.
