= Haudi Abdillah =

Indonesian footballer (born 1993)

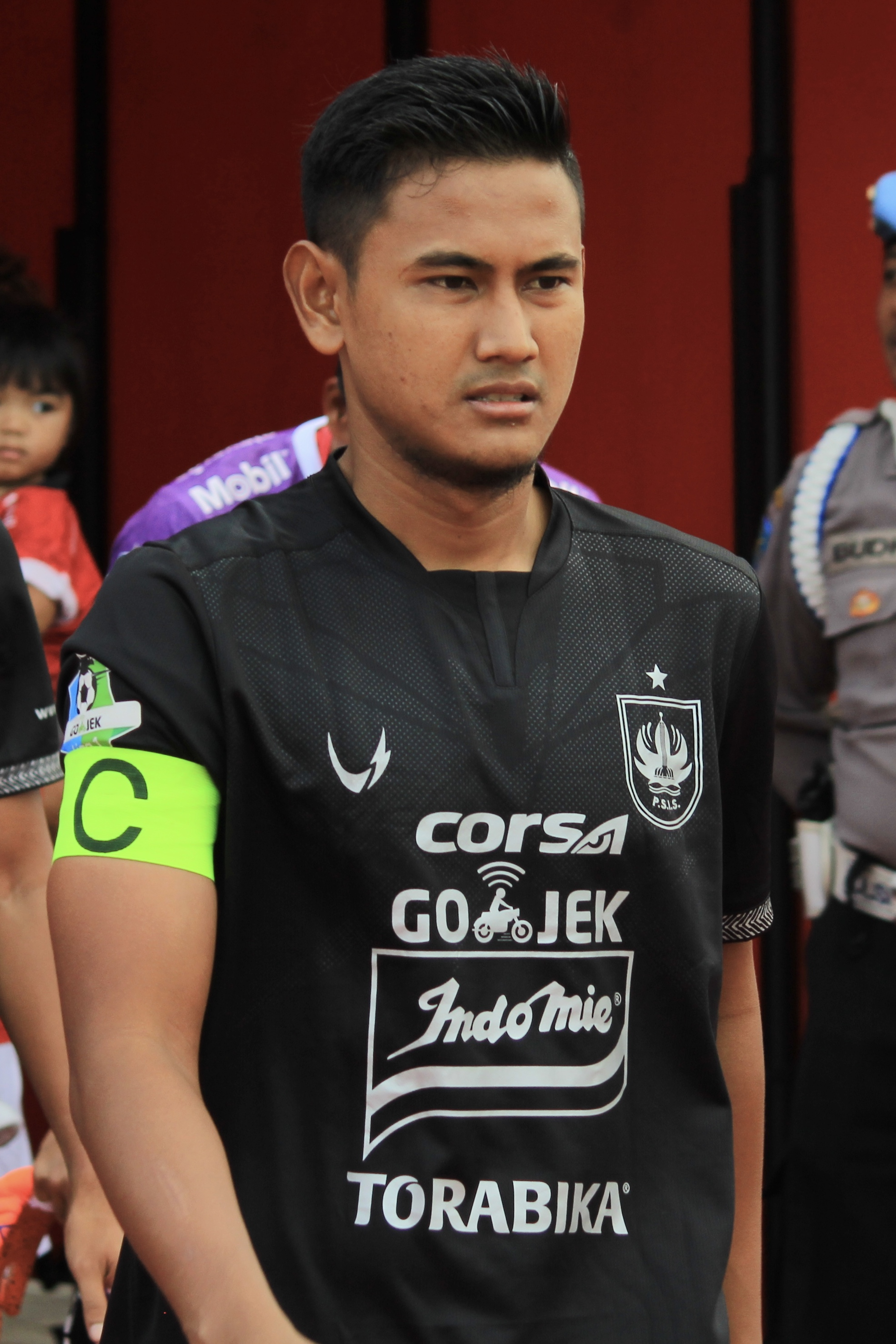
- Haudi playing for PSIS Semarang in 2018

Personal information
- Full name: Haudi Abdillah
- Date of birth: 20 April 1993 (age 33)
- Place of birth: Denpasar, Indonesia
- Height: 1.80 m (5 ft 11 in)
- Position: Centre-back

Team information
- Current team: Barito Putera
- Number: 35

Youth career
- PPLP Salatiga

Senior career*
| Years | Team | Apps | (Gls) |
| 2011–2012 | Persibas Banyumas | 26 | (0) |
| 2012–2016 | PSCS Cilacap | 43 | (5) |
| 2017–2019 | PSIS Semarang | 47 | (3) |
| 2019–2024 | Bali United | 60 | (2) |
| 2024–2025 | Madura United | 16 | (0) |
| 2025– | Barito Putera | 20 | (0) |
- * Club domestic league appearances and goals as of 25 April 2026

Haudi Abdillah (born 20 April 1993) is an Indonesian professional footballer who plays as a centre-back for Liga 2 club Barito Putera.

== Club career ==
=== Persibas Banyumas ===
Haudi signed his first professional contract with Persibas Banyumas on 2011–2012 at Divisi I Liga Indonesia. In that season, Persibas Banyumas finished the 3rd position in first stage of Divisi I Liga Indonesia under Persika Karawang and Persibangga Purbalingga.

=== PSCS Cilacap ===
Haudi Move to PSCS Cilacap and spent 5 (five) seasons in there (2012 - 2016). His first goal for PSCS Cilacap he made when 2–1 victory over Pusamania Borneo F.C. in 2014 Liga Indonesia Premier Division clash on 23 October 2014 at Wijayakusuma Stadium. During the 2016, led PSCS Cilacap achieve Indonesia Soccer Championship B 2016 Winners. In the final match, Haudi scored 1 goal in the extra time and won 4–3 over PSS Sleman.

=== PSIS Semarang ===
13 January 2017 Haudi joined PSIS Semarang, he was choose as captain in his first season and success led PSIS Semarang to promote to Liga 1.

=== Bali United ===
On 12 January 2019, Haudi signed two years contract with Bali United for 2019 Liga 1. Haudi made his Bali United debut five months later on 30 June in a Liga 1 match against Badak Lampung in a 3–0 away win. On 2 December 2019, Bali United won the championship for the first time in their history, becoming the seventh club to win the Liga 1 after second placed Borneo draw to PSM, followed by a win in Semen Padang, giving Bali United a 17-point lead with only four games left.

== Honours ==
PSCS Cilacap

- Indonesia Soccer Championship B: 2016

PSIS Semarang

- Liga 2 third place (play-offs): 2017

Bali United

- Liga 1: 2019, 2021–22
