= Michael Orah =

Indonesian footballer

Personal information
- Full name: Michael Yansen Orah
- Date of birth: 3 July 1985 (age 41)
- Place of birth: Tomohon, Indonesia
- Height: 1.74 m (5 ft 9 in)
- Position: Left back

Senior career*
Years	Team	Apps	(Gls)
2006–2007	Persmin Minahasa	0	(0)
2008–2009	PSIR Rembang	7	(0)
2009–2010	PSKT Tomohon	3	(0)
2010–2011	Barito Putera	14	(1)
2011–2012	PSPS Pekanbaru	19	(2)
2012–2014	Madura Utama	38	(0)
2015–2016	Mitra Kukar	18	(1)
2016–2017	Borneo	34	(2)
2017	Persija Jakarta (loan)	9	(0)
2017–2018	Kalteng Putra	11	(0)
2018–2019	Persija Jakarta	11	(0)
2019–2022	Bali United	22	(0)
2022	Sulut United	2	(0)
- * Club domestic league appearances and goals as of 14:37, 10 September 2022 (UTC)

Michael Yansen Orah (born July 3, 1985) is an Indonesian professional footballer who plays as a left back.

== Honours ==
Mitra Kukar

- Piala Jenderal Sudirman: 2015

Borneo

- Indonesia President's Cup runner-up: 2017

Persija Jakarta

- Liga 1: 2018

Bali United

- Liga 1: 2019, 2021–22
