= 2018–19 Piala Indonesia =

Tournament details
- Country: Indonesia
- Dates: 8 May 2018 – 6 August 2019
- Teams: 128

Final positions
- Champions: PSM (1st title)
- Runners-up: Persija

Tournament statistics
- Matches played: 146
- Goals scored: 506 (3.47 per match)
- Top goal scorer(s): Amido Baldé; Zulham Zamrun (10 goals each)

Awards
- Best player: Zulham Zamrun
- Goals scored in penalty shoot-outs are not included.

The 2018–19 Piala Indonesia (known as the Krating Daeng Piala Indonesia for sponsorship reasons) was the seventh edition of Piala Indonesia. It began with the first round on 8 May 2018, and concluded with the finals on 21 July and 6 August 2019. The winner would qualify for the play-off round of the 2020 AFC Cup.

2012 Piala Indonesia winners Persibo were the defending champions, as there were no competition from 2013 to 2017 for various reasons, but they were eliminated in the first round by Madura United.

PSM won the competition by defeating Persija 2–1 on aggregate in the two-legged finals, winning their first title.

== Participating teams ==
The following 128 teams participated for the competition:

| League | Teams | |
|---|---|---|
| Liga 1 (2018 season) | Arema; Bali United; Barito Putera; Bhayangkara; Borneo; Madura United; Mitra Kukar; Persebaya; Persela; Perseru; Persib; Persija; Persipura; PSIS; PSM; PSMS; Sriwijaya; TIRA-Persikabo | |
| Liga 2 (2018 season) | Aceh United; Blitar United; Cilegon United; Kalteng Putra; Madura; Martapura; Persegres; Perserang; Persiba; Persibat; Persik Kendal; Persika; Persiraja; Persis; Persita; Persiwa; PSBS; PSIM; PSIR; PSMP; PSPS Riau; PSS; Semen Padang; Semeru | |
| Liga 3 | 2018 season National zone participants | 757 Kepri Jaya; Bogor; Celebest; Lampung Sakti; Madiun Putra; Persatu; Persbul; Perseka; Persekam Metro; Persekap; Persepam; Persewangi; Persiba Bantul; Persibangga; Persibas; Persida; Persigubin; Persih Masurai; Persijap; Persik; Persikabo; Persinga; Persip; Persipon; Perssu; PS Badung; PS Bengkulu; PS West Sumbawa; PS Timah Babel; PSBI; PSBK; PSBL; PSCS; PSGC; Yahukimo |
| Liga 3 | 2017 season Regional round winners | Batang Anai; Bintang Kranggan; Deltras; Gadjah Mada; Kuala Nanggroe; Maung Anom; Nabil; Patriot Candrabhaga; Persbit; Perse; Persekaba Bali; Persekabpas; Persewar; Persibeng; Persibo; Persidago; Persijam; Persilat; Persimura; Persintan; Persipal; Persitangsel; Persiter; Peseban; PES Pessel; PS Bangka Selection; PS Beltim; PS Benteng; PS Bintan; PS Keluarga USU; PS Matra; PS Pelauw Putra; PSAD Balikpapan; PSDS; PSKC; PSKT West Sumbawa; Sidrap United; SS Lampung; Villa 2000 B |
| Liga 3 | Invited teams | Blitar Poetra; Kotabaru; Persab; Persekap Kapuas; Persibara; Persid; Persiga; Persipur; Persitema; PSD; PSIP |

== Format and seeding ==
Teams enter the competition at various stages, as follows:

- First stage (one-legged fixtures, the lower league team as home team)
  - First round: 128 teams from Liga 1, Liga 2, and Liga 3 divided into 16 zones, started the tournament
  - Second round: the 64 winners divided into 8 zones
- Second stage (two-legged fixtures)
  - Round of 32: the 32 winners divided into 4 zones
  - Round of 16: the 16 winners divided into 2 zones
- Final stage (two-legged fixtures without zone division)
  - Quarter-finals: the 8 round of 16 winners are inserted into a bracket
  - Semi-finals
  - Finals

== Round and draw dates ==
The schedule of each round was as follows:

| Phase | Round | Draw date | First leg | Second leg |
|---|---|---|---|---|
| First stage | First round | 3 May 2018 | 8 May – 2 September 2018 | |
| First stage | Second round | 10 November 2018 | 20 November 2018 – 5 January 2019 | |
| Second stage | Round of 32 | 8 January 2019 | 23 January – 5 February 2019 | 31 January – 16 February 2019 |
| Second stage | Round of 16 | 8 February 2019 | 15–19 February 2019 | 20–24 February 2019 |
| Final stage | Quarter-finals | 15 April 2019 | 24 April – 19 June 2019 | 3 May – 27 June 2019 |
| Final stage | Semi-finals | 15 April 2019 | 29–30 June 2019 | 6–7 July 2019 |
| Final stage | Finals | 15 April 2019 | 21 July 2019 | 6 August 2019 |

== First stage ==
=== First round ===
The first round was featured by 128 teams. The first round matches were played from 8 May to 2 September 2018. Match list sorted by zone. All times are WIB (UTC+7).

Number of teams per tier still in competition
| Liga 1 | Liga 2 | Liga 3 | Total |
|---|---|---|---|
| 18 / 18 | 24 / 24 | 86 / 86 | 128 / 128 |

| 8 August 2018 Zone 1 | Kuala Nanggroe (3) | 1–5 | PSMS (1) | Banda Aceh, Aceh |
| 20:30 | Dian 62' | Report | Hidayat 8', 35'; Felipe 16', 80'; Tanidis 83' | Stadium: H. Dimurthala Stadium |

| 31 July 2018 Zone 1 | PSBL (3) | 1–1 (4–3 p) | Persiraja (2) | Langsa, Aceh |
| 15:00 | Febri 36' | Report | Mudasir 5' | Stadium: Langsa Stadium |

| 30 June 2018 Zone 1 | PSDS (3) | 1–3 | Aceh United (2) | Lubuk Pakam, North Sumatra |
| 15:00 | Irsan 18' | Report | Yongki 17'; Fadhli 69', 76' | Stadium: Baharuddin Siregar Stadium |

| 5 July 2018 Zone 1 | PS Keluarga USU (3) | 3–0 | Mandailing Raya (3) | Medan, North Sumatra |
| 15:00 | Nurdian 28', 41'; Referendi 86' | Report | | Stadium: Mini USU Stadium |

| 1 August 2018 Zone 2 | 757 Kepri Jaya (3) | 2–1 | PSPS Riau (2) | Batam, Riau Islands |
| 15:00 | Ichsan 14'; Nanang 39' | Report | Renggur 50' | Stadium: Gelora Citramas Stadium |

| 13 August 2018 Zone 2 | Persih Masurai (3) | 1–5 | Semen Padang (2) | Merangin, Jambi |
| 15:00 | Hardiansyah 71' | Report | Afriansyah 5'; Fingkreuw 14'; Maran 65', 74'; Cingi 88' | Stadium: Bumi Masurai Stadium |

| 15 July 2018 Zone 2 | PesPessel (3) | 2–1 | Batang Anai (3) | Pesisir Selatan, West Sumatra |
| 15:00 | Sandi 6'; Adek 15' | Report | Randy 76' | Stadium: Haji Ilyas Yakub Rawang Stadium |
Note: This match was originally scheduled on 8 July 2018 but it was postponed because both teams just met in the last 16 of 2018 Liga 3 West Sumatra on 7 July 2018.

| 30 July 2018 Zone 2 | PS Bintan (3) | cancelled | Nabil (3) | Tanjung Pinang, Riau Islands |
| 15:00 | | | | Stadium: Bintan Stadium |
Note: PS Bintan withdrew from this competition because they didn't have a stadium that met Piala Indonesia standards, so Nabil advance to the next round.

| 25 July 2018 Zone 3 | PS Bangka Selection (3) | 0–4 | Sriwijaya (1) | Sungailiat, Bangka Belitung Islands |
| 15:00 | | Report | Dzhalilov 25', 37' (pen.); Faris 35'; Christianson 80' | Stadium: Orom Stadium |

| 7 August 2018 Zone 3 | Persimura (3) | cancelled | PS Timah BaBel (3) | Lubuklinggau, South Sumatra |
| 15:00 | | | | Stadium: Petanang Stadium |
Note: PS Timah BaBel withdrew from 2018 Liga 3. As a result, PS Timah BaBel couldn't participate in Piala Indonesia and this match was cancelled.

| 4 August 2018 Zone 3 | PS Beltim (3) | cancelled | PS Bengkulu (3) | East Belitung, Bangka Belitung Islands |
| 15:00 | | | | Stadium: East Belitung Main Stadium |
Note: PS Bengkulu withdrew from 2018 Liga 3. As a result, PS Bengkulu couldn't participate in Piala Indonesia and this match was cancelled.

| 28 July 2018 Zone 3 | PS Benteng (3) | 4–1 | Persijam (3) | Bengkulu, Bengkulu |
| 15:00 | Hendri 3', 76'; Hamdan 20'; Rifadli 35' | Report | Andre 17' | Stadium: Semarak Stadium |

| 30 June 2018 Zone 4 | Persitangsel (3) | 0–7 | Bhayangkara (1) | Cilegon, Banten |
| 15:00 | | Report | Mofu 12', 61', 68'; Dzumafo 32'; Sérgio 44'; Dendy 54'; Indra 90+2' | Stadium: Krakatau Steel Stadium |

| 29 June 2018 Zone 4 | Lampung Sakti (3) | 2–1 | Perserang (2) | Bandar Lampung, Lampung |
| 15:00 | Restu 65'; Ihwan 87' | Report | Ervin 42' | Stadium: Sumpah Pemuda Stadium |

| 30 June 2018 Zone 4 | SS Lampung (3) | 1–6 | Cilegon United (2) | Bandar Lampung, Lampung |
| 15:00 | Marsel 48' | Report | Juansyah 32' (pen.); Suhendri 33'; Sopian 37'; Nanang 57'; Ade Ivan 62', 74' | Stadium: Pahoman Stadium |

| 21 July 2018 Zone 4 | Persilat (3) | 0–3 | Persita (2) | Bandar Lampung, Lampung |
| 15:00 | | Report | Engkus 29'; Banowo 69', 80' | Stadium: Sumpah Pemuda Stadium |

| 9 August 2018 Zone 5 | Persikabo (3) | 0–2 | Persija (1) | Bantul, Special Region of Yogyakarta |
| 15:00 | | Report | Silva 7' (pen.); Osas 82' | Stadium: Sultan Agung Stadium |

| 7 July 2018 Zone 5 | Villa 2000 B (3) | 0–2 | Persiwa (2) | Kuningan, West Java |
| 15:00 | | Report | Aldo 2'; Fadil 9' | Stadium: Mashud Wisnusaputra Stadium |

| 14 August 2018 Zone 5 | Bogor (3) | 0–0 (6–5 p) | Persika (2) | South Jakarta, Jakarta |
| 15:00 | | Report | | Stadium: PTIK Stadium |

| 9 July 2018 Zone 5 | Patriot Candrabhaga (3) | 1–2 | Bintang Kranggan (3) | Bekasi, West Java |
| 15:00 | Pajar 35' | Report | Gilang 33'; Erlangga 52' | Stadium: Muda Jaya Stadium |

| 15 August 2018 Zone 6 | PSKC (3) | 1–2 | Persib (1) | Tasikmalaya, West Java |
| 15:00 | Rodliyan 10' | Report | Airlangga 35'; Atep 66' | Stadium: Wiradadaha Stadium |
Note: This match was originally scheduled on 4 July 2018 but the police did not give permission for the match to be held on that day because it coincides with KPU agenda of plenary meeting on vote election result of West Java Election.

| 21 July 2018 Zone 6 | Maung Anom (3) | 1–1 (4–5 p) | Persibat (2) | Tasikmalaya, West Java |
| 15:00 | Rizki 69' | Report | Arif 55' | Stadium: Wiradadaha Stadium |

| 16 July 2018 Zone 6 | PSCS (3) | 3–1 | Persibangga (3) | Cilacap, Central Java |
| 15:00 | Jemi 4'; Arbeta 54'; Irvan 76' | Report | Afrizan 90' | Stadium: Wijayakusuma Stadium |

| 15 July 2018 Zone 6 | Persibas (3) | 2–1 | PSGC (3) | Purwokerto, Central Java |
| 15:00 | Fikram 13', 53' | Report | Deni 48' | Stadium: Satria Stadium |

| 10 August 2018 Zone 7 | Persab (3) | 1–3 | PSIS (1) | Brebes, Central Java |
| 15:00 | Kiki 4' | Report | Melcior 15'; Fauzan 81'; Conteh 86' | Stadium: Karang Birahi Stadium |

| 12 July 2018 Zone 7 | PSIP (3) | 1–1 (5–4 p) | PSIR (2) | Pemalang, Central Java |
| 15:00 | Ibnu 33' | Report | Islam 5' | Stadium: Sirandu Stadium |

| 6 July 2018 Zone 7 | Persipur (3) | 1–2 | Persik Kendal (2) | Purwodadi, Central Java |
| 15:00 | Roni 90+2' | Report | Irwandoyo 37'; Alaik 44' | Stadium: Krida Bakti Stadium |

| 14 July 2018 Zone 7 | Persip (3) | 0–2 | Persijap (3) | Pekalongan, Central Java |
| 15:00 | | Report | Cahyono 27'; Raharjanto 68' | Stadium: Jenderal Hoegeng Stadium |

| 24 July 2018 Zone 8 | Persiba Bantul (3) | 0–4 | TIRA-Persikabo (1) | Bantul, Special Region of Yogyakarta |
| 15:00 | | Report | Nufiandani 51', 66'; Sansan 55' (pen.); Firmansyah 71' | Stadium: Sultan Agung Stadium; Referee: Bachrul Ulum |

| 22 July 2018 Zone 8 | Persitema (3) | 0–2 | PSIM (2) | Temanggung, Central Java |
| 15:00 | | Report | Nanda 38'; Fandy 90+1' | Stadium: Bumi Phala Stadium |

| 18 July 2018 Zone 8 | PSD (3) | 0–1 | PSS (2) | Demak, Central Java |
| 15:00 | | Report | Nugroho 61' (pen.) | Stadium: Pancasila Stadium |

| 18 July 2018 Zone 8 | Persibara (3) | 5–0 | Gadjah Mada (3) | Banjarnegara, Central Java |
| 15:00 | Wisnu 37', 48', 63'; Teja 64'; Fait 72' | Report | | Stadium: Sumitro Kolopaking Stadium |

| 9 May 2018 Zone 9 | PSBK (3) | 0–2 | Arema (1) | Blitar, East Java |
| 18:30 | | Report | Dedik 29', 40' | Stadium: Gelora Supriyadi Stadium; Referee: Juwari |

| 2 August 2018 Zone 9 | Persinga (3) | 1–0 | Persis (2) | Ngawi, East Java |
| 15:00 | Harris 54' | Report | | Stadium: Ketonggo Stadium |

| 17 July 2018 Zone 9 | Madiun Putra (3) | 2–4 | Blitar United (2) | Madiun, East Java |
| 15:00 | Alfian 40'; Purniawan 85' | Report | Zulianto 22', 37', 52'; Didik 25' | Stadium: Wilis Stadium |

| 22 July 2018 Zone 9 | Persekam Metro (3) | 1–1 (5–4 p) | Persiga (3) | Malang, East Java |
| 15:00 | Yogi 13' | Report | Ali 11' | Stadium: Kanjuruhan Stadium |

| 8 May 2018 Zone 10 | Persibo (3) | 1–1 (1–3 p) | Madura United (1) | Bojonegoro, East Java |
| 15:00 | Basri 49' | Report | Engelbert 13' | Stadium: Letjen Haji Sudirman Stadium; Referee: Fariq Hitaba |
| | Penalties |
| | Shulton (penalty missed); Agatha (penalty missed); Lendy (penalty scored); Ervianto (penalty missed) | | Zah Rahan (penalty scored); Beto (penalty scored); Engelbert (penalty missed); Slamet (penalty scored) |

| 30 June 2018 Zone 10 | Persatu (3) | 0–2 | Persegres (2) | Tuban, East Java |
| 15:00 | | Report | Saddam 80'; Revi 83' | Stadium: Loka Jaya Stadium |

| 1 July 2018 Zone 10 | Persepam (3) | 1–5 | Madura (2) | Pamekasan, East Java |
| 15:00 | Anis 41' (pen.) | Report | Isa 15', 52', 90+2'; Ferdian 31'; Vemberyono 85' (pen.) | Stadium: Gelora Ratu Pamelingan Stadium |

| 10 July 2018 Zone 10 | Persekap (3) | 1–1 (3–4 p) | Perssu (3) | Pasuruan, East Java |
| 15:00 | Agies 66' | Report | Rusli 71' | Stadium: Untung Suropati Stadium |
| | Penalties |
| | Agies (penalty scored); Jakfar (penalty scored); Anwar (penalty scored) | | Imam (penalty scored); Riswan (penalty scored); Papin (penalty scored); Rijal (penalty scored) |

| 15 May 2018 Zone 11 | Persik (3) | 1–2 | Persela (1) | Kediri, East Java |
| 15:00 | Fahad 44' | Report | Sugeng 83'; Arnaud 85' | Stadium: Brawijaya Stadium; Referee: Dwi Purba |

| 2 September 2018 Zone 11 | PSBI (3) | 0–14 | Persebaya (1) | Surabaya, East Java |
| 15:00 | | Report | Haay 7', 49'; Dutra 12' (pen.), 82'; Irwan 36'; Da Silva 41', 44', 45', 60'; Abu Rizal 63'; Rishadi 66'; Oktafianus 72'; Sanadi 80'; Kayame 84' | Stadium: Jala Krida Bumimoro AAL Stadium |
Note: This match was originally scheduled on 1 July 2018 but the police did not give permission for the match to be held on that day.

| 30 June 2018 Zone 11 | Blitar Poetra (3) | 0–3 | PSMP (2) | Blitar, East Java |
| 15:00 | | Report | Pellu 14'; Kartanto 30'; Dio 75' | Stadium: Gelora Bumi Penataran Stadium |

| 14 May 2018 Zone 11 | Persekabpas (3) | 1–0 | Persid (3) | Bangil, East Java |
| 15:00 | Ricko 23' | Report | | Stadium: R. Soedarsono Stadium; Referee: Ikhsan Prasetya Jati |

| 2 July 2018 Zone 12 | PS West Sumbawa (3) | 0–4 | Bali United (1) | Taliwang, West Nusa Tenggara |
| 15:00 | | Report | Wiantara 35'; Yandi 54'; Syarapuddin 77' (o.g.); Martinus 85' | Stadium: Lalu Magaparang Stadium |

| 1 July 2018 Zone 12 | PS Badung (3) | 0–2 | Semeru (2) | Kuta, Bali |
| 15:00 | | Report | Yogi 40', 72' | Stadium: Gelora Samudera Stadium |

| 5 August 2018 Zone 12 | Persekaba Bali (3) | cancelled | Perse (3) | Kuta, Bali |
| 15:00 | | | | Stadium: Gelora Samudera Stadium |
Note: Perse withdrew from this competition because they want to concentrate in 2018 Liga 3 East Nusa Tenggara.

| 19 July 2018 Zone 12 | PSKT West Sumbawa (3) | 1–0 | Persewangi (3) | Taliwang, West Nusa Tenggara |
| 15:00 | Pandu 69' | Report | | Stadium: Lalu Magaparang Stadium |

| 29 June 2018 Zone 13 | Kotabaru (3) | 0–3 | Barito Putera (1) | Kotabaru, South Kalimantan |
| 15:00 | | Report | Chalwa 1'; Musafri 3'; Nazarul 13' | Stadium: Bamega Stadium; Referee: Bahrul Ulum |

| 29 June 2018 Zone 13 | Martapura (2) | cancelled | Persibeng (3) | Martapura, South Kalimantan |
| 15:00 | | | | Stadium: Demang Lehman Stadium |
Note: Persibeng was disqualified by PSSI for not doing an online player registration process.

| 15 August 2018 Zone 13 | Persipon (3) | 2–5 | Kalteng Putra (2) | Pontianak, West Kalimantan |
| 15:00 | Hanafi 51', 86' | Report | Dadang 16'; Chalwa 27', 39', 87'; Rumere 41' | Stadium: Sultan Syarif Abdurrahman Stadium |
Note: This match was originally scheduled on 30 June 2018 in Tuah Pahoe Stadium Palangka Raya but it was postponed because there was no police permit.

| 13 July 2018 Zone 13 | Peseban (3) | 3–2 | Persida (3) | Banjarmasin, South Kalimantan |
| 15:00 | Alam 31'; Rifani 69'; Murjani 84' | Report | Hidayat 64'; Kibar 90+3' | Stadium: May 17th Stadium |

| 31 July 2018 Zone 14 | Persekap Kapuas (3) | cancelled | Mitra Kukar (1) | Kapuas, Central Kalimantan |
| 15:00 | | | | Stadium: Pananjung Tarung Stadium |
Note: Persekap Kapuas withdrew from this competition, so Mitra Kukar advance to the next round.

| 2 August 2018 Zone 14 | PSAD Balikpapan (3) | cancelled | Borneo (1) | Balikpapan, East Kalimantan |
| 15:00 | | | | Stadium: Parikesit Stadium |
Note: PSAD Balikpapan didn't take part in 2018 Liga 3 East Kalimantan. As a result, PSAD Balikpapan couldn't participate in Piala Indonesia and this match was cancelled.

| 13 August 2018 Zone 14 | Deltras (3) | 2–3 | Persiba (2) | Sidoarjo, East Java |
| 15:00 | Dzulfikar 46'; Fenosa 64' | Report | Orock 22', 37'; Turnando 43' | Stadium: Gelora Delta Stadium |

| 23 July 2018 Zone 14 | Persbul (3) | 2–0 | Persbit (3) | Buol, Central Sulawesi |
| 15:00 | Rifai 58', 69' | Report | | Stadium: Kuonoto Stadium |

| 19 July 2018 Zone 15 | PSM (1) | cancelled | Sidrap United (3) | Makassar, South Sulawesi |
| 15:00 | | | | Stadium: Andi Mattalata Stadium |
Note: Sidrap United withdrew from 2018 Liga 3 South Sulawesi. As a result, Sidrap United couldn't participate in Piala Indonesia and this match was cancelled.

| 26 July 2018 Zone 15 | Persipal (3) | cancelled | Persigubin (3) | Palu, Central Sulawesi |
| 15:00 | | | | Stadium: Gawalise Stadium |
Note: Persigubin withdrew from 2018 Liga 3. As a result, Persigubin couldn't participate in Piala Indonesia and this match was cancelled.

| 20 July 2018 Zone 15 | Persidago (3) | 2–1 | PS Matra (3) | Gorontalo, Gorontalo |
| 15:00 | Fatra 21'; Ismail 90+1' | Report | Wugaje 22' | Stadium: January 23rd Stadium |

| 17 July 2018 Zone 15 | Persiter (3) | 2–1 | Celebest (3) | Ternate, North Maluku |
| 15:00 | Sahrudin 80'; Zifar 90+1' | Report | Agim 82' | Stadium: Gelora Kieraha Stadium |

| 3 July 2018 Zone 16 | Yahukimo (3) | 0–3 | Persipura (1) | Sentani, Papua |
| 14:00 | | Report | Basna 57'; Merauje 62'; Wanma 68' | Stadium: Barnabas Youwe Stadium |

| 26 July 2018 Zone 16 | Persintan (3) | 2–3 | Perseru (1) | Jayapura, Papua |
| 15:00 | Kapisa 25'; Naa 83' (pen.) | Report | Isir 65'; Monim 73'; Nabar 90+2' (pen.) | Stadium: Mandala Stadium |

| 2 August 2018 Zone 16 | Persewar (3) | 2–1 | PSBS (2) | Sentani, Papua |
| 15:00 | Kipin 23'; Kararbo | Report | Rumaropen 7' | Stadium: Barnabas Youwe Stadium; Referee: Moh. Anis Bil |

| 21 July 2018 Zone 16 | Pelauw Putra (3) | 3–0 | Perseka (3) | Ambon, Maluku |
| 15:00 | Rumaselan 2', 36'; Tuanany 87' | Report | | Stadium: Mandala Remaja Stadium; Referee: Tabrani |

=== Second round ===
The second round was featured by 64 teams which were the winners of the first round. The second round matches was played from 20 November 2018 to 5 January 2019. Match list sorted by zone. All times are WIB (UTC+7).

Number of teams per tier still in competition
| Liga 1 | Liga 2 | Liga 3 | Total |
|---|---|---|---|
| 18 / 18 | 17 / 24 | 29 / 86 | 64 / 128 |

| 4 December 2018 Zone 1 | PesPessel (3) | 1–2 | PS Keluarga USU (3) | Pesisir Selatan, West Sumatra |
| 15:00 | Gebra 32' | Report | Ardi 58'; Randika 75' | Stadium: Haji Ilyas Yakub Rawang Stadium; Referee: Wawan Rapiko |

| 7 December 2018 Zone 1 | Nabil (3) | 0–2 | Semen Padang (2) | Pelalawan, Riau |
| 15:00 | | Report | Lestaluhu 15'; Maran 76' | Stadium: Mini Bagan Laguh Stadium; Referee: Rihendra Purba |

| 13 December 2018 Zone 1 | 757 Kepri Jaya (3) | 1–1 (4–3 p) | PSMS (1) | Batam, Riau Islands |
| 15:00 | Nanang 51' | Report | Erwin 13' | Stadium: Gelora Citramas Stadium; Referee: Wawan Rapiko |

| 24 December 2018 Zone 1 | PSBL (3) | 4–1 | Aceh United (2) | Langsa, Aceh |
| 16:00 | Arif 5'; Rama 48', 60', 83' | Report | Fadhli 80' | Stadium: Langsa Stadium |

| 14 December 2018 Zone 2 | Persimura (3) | 0–3 | Sriwijaya (1) | Palembang, South Sumatra |
| 15:00 | | Report | Rizky 47'; Henrique 73', 85' (pen.) | Stadium: Gelora Sriwijaya Stadium |

| 9 December 2018 Zone 2 | PS Beltim (3) | 2–5 | Cilegon United (2) | East Belitung, Bangka Belitung Islands |
| 15:00 | Candra 42'; Novra 45' | Report | Rinto 13', 58'; Sopian 64'; Suhendri 72', 91' | Stadium: East Belitung Main Stadium |

| 15 December 2018 Zone 2 | PS Benteng (3) | 1–5 | Bhayangkara (1) | Kebayoran Baru, Jakarta |
| 15:00 | Hamid 90+1' | Report | Alsan 15', 39'; Dzumafo 25', 45+2'; Agustinus 81' | Stadium: PTIK Stadium |

| 22 December 2018 Zone 2 | Lampung Sakti (3) | 0–1 | Persita (2) | Bandar Lampung, Lampung |
| 15:00 | | Report | Al Achya 89' | Stadium: Sumpah Pemuda Stadium |

| 30 November 2018 Zone 3 | Bintang Kranggan (3) | 1–4 | Persibat (2) | Depok, West Java |
| 15:00 | Gilang 68' | Report | Nur Coyo 14'; Honi 55', 70'; Isa 80' | Stadium: Heri Sudrajat Stadium |

| 12 December 2018 Zone 3 | Bogor (3) | 0–1 | Persija (1) | Gianyar, Bali |
| 14:00 | | Report | Osas 19' | Stadium: Kapten I Wayan Dipta Stadium; Referee: Bachrul Ulum |

| 30 December 2018 Zone 3 | Persibas (3) | 1–1 (3–4 p) | Persiwa (2) | Purwokerto, Central Java |
| 15:00 | Jusuf 47' | Report | Salim 81' | Stadium: Satria Stadium |

| 5 December 2018 Zone 3 | PSCS (3) | 0–1 | Persib (1) | Cilacap, Central Java |
| 15:00 | | Report | Febri 49' | Stadium: Wijayakusuma Stadium; Referee: Fariq Hitaba |

| 24 November 2018 Zone 4 | PSIP (3) | 2–2 (4–5 p) | Persik Kendal (2) | Pemalang, Central Java |
| 15:00 | Triwibowo 9'; Ibnu 88' | Report | Rizki 33'; Alaik 54' | Stadium: Sirandu Stadium; Referee: Untung |

| 23 November 2018 Zone 4 | Persijap (3) | 0–1 | PSIS (1) | Jepara, Central Java |
| 15:00 | | Report | Gustur 75' | Stadium: Gelora Bumi Kartini Stadium; Referee: Bachrul Ulum |

| 28 December 2018 Zone 4 | Persibara (3) | cancelled | PSS (2) | Banjarnegara, Central Java |
| 15:00 | | | | Stadium: Sumitro Kolopaking Stadium |
Note: Persibara withdrew from the competition. Therefore, PSS advanced to the next round.

| 11 December 2018 Zone 4 | TIRA-Persikabo (1) | 2–0 | PSIM (2) | Bantul, Special Region of Yogyakarta |
| 15:00 | Herwin 52'; Pandi 80' | Report | | Stadium: Sultan Agung Stadium; Referee: Maulana Nugraha |
Note: This match was stopped at 80 minute due to supporter's riot. Both managers agreed not to continue the match.

| 27 December 2018 Zone 5 | Persinga (3) | 3–0 | Persegres (2) | Ngawi, East Java |
| 15:00 | Harris 37' (pen.), 69'; Slamet 66' | Report | | Stadium: Ketonggo Stadium; Referee: Hamim Tohari |

| 29 December 2018 Zone 5 | Perssu (3) | 2–4 | Blitar United (2) | Sumenep, East Java |
| 15:00 | Rega 65'; Rusli 90+3' | Report | Didik 3', 29'; Aulia 72'; Jefri 89' | Stadium: Ahmad Yani Stadium |

| 20 November 2018 Zone 5 | Persekam Metro (3) | 1–5 | Arema (1) | Malang, East Java |
| 15:00 | Hendra 55' | Report | Sunarto 9'; Nasir 14'; Konaté 29', 88'; Alfarizi 32' | Stadium: Gajayana Stadium |

| 6 December 2018 Zone 5 | Madura (2) | 1–4 | Madura United (1) | Sumenep, East Java |
| 15:00 | Prayitno 21' | Report | Engelbert 63', 70'; Imam 77'; Beltrame 83' (pen.) | Stadium: Ahmad Yani Stadium |

| 16 December 2018 Zone 6 | Persekabpas (3) | 0–2 | Bali United (1) | Bangil, East Java |
| 15:00 | | Report | Fadil 17'; Spasojević 72' | Stadium: R. Soedarsono Stadium; Referee: Muhammad Irham |

| 23 December 2018 Zone 6 | PSKT West Sumbawa (3) | 2–4 | Persebaya (1) | Mataram, West Nusa Tenggara |
| 14:00 | Jumardih 18', 77' | Report | Misbakus 39' (pen.); Fandi 49'; Rendi 71'; Jaya 88' | Stadium: December 17th Stadium; Referee: Novari Ikhsan |

| 21 December 2018 Zone 6 | Persekaba Bali (3) | 0–6 | Persela (1) | Lamongan, East Java |
| 15:00 | | Report | Agung 6'; Dendy 7', 63'; Syahroni 21'; Saddil 37' (pen.); Zaenuri 72' | Stadium: Surajaya Stadium |

| 10 December 2018 Zone 6 | PSMP (2) | 2–0 | Semeru (2) | Surabaya, East Java |
| 15:00 | Derry 6'; Pellu 33' | Report | | Stadium: Jala Krida Bumimoro AAL Stadium |

| 20 December 2018 Zone 7 | Persiba (2) | 1–2 | Mitra Kukar (1) | Balikpapan, East Kalimantan |
| 15:00 | Cahyono 67' | Report | Septian 53'; Mursalim 75' | Stadium: Batakan Stadium; Referee: Bachrul Ulum |

| 19 December 2018 Zone 7 | Persbul (3) | 1–3 | Barito Putera (1) | Buol, Central Sulawesi |
| 14:00 | Saldin 82' | Report | Musafri 44'; Rifqi 46'; Gavin 76' | Stadium: Kuonoto Stadium |

| 8 December 2018 Zone 7 | Peseban (3) | 0–6 | Kalteng Putra (2) | Banjarmasin, South Kalimantan |
| 14:00 | | Report | Beny 9', 49', 50', 54'; Rumere 17'; Kushedya 72' | Stadium: May 17th Stadium; Referee: Untung |

| 3 December 2018 Zone 7 | Martapura (2) | 0–1 | Borneo (1) | Martapura, South Kalimantan |
| 15:00 | | Report | Lerby 75' (pen.) | Stadium: Demang Lehman Stadium |

| 5 January 2019 Zone 8 | Persewar (3) | 1–2 | Perseru (1) | Serui, Papua |
| 13:00 | Wombaibo 51' | Report | Escobar 23'; Meosido 85' | Stadium: Marora Stadium |

| 22 December 2018 Zone 8 | Persiter (3) | 3–3 (2–3 p) | PSM (1) | Ternate, North Maluku |
| 13:00 | Zifar 49' (pen.), 84'; Chalil 61' | Report | Zulham 17', 43', 76' | Stadium: Gelora Kieraha Stadium |

| 18 December 2018 Zone 8 | Pelauw Putra (3) | 0–2 | Persipura (1) | Ambon, Maluku |
| 13:00 | | Report | Wanma 34'; Gunansar 37' | Stadium: Mandala Remaja Stadium |

| 29 December 2018 Zone 8 | Persipal (3) | cancelled | Persidago (3) | Palu, Central Sulawesi |
| 14:00 | | | | Stadium: Gawalise Stadium |
Note: Persipal withdrew from the competition. Therefore, Persidago advanced to the next round.

== Second stage ==
=== Round of 32 ===
For the round of 32, the first legs was played from 23 January to 5 February 2019 and the second from 31 January to 16 February 2019. The division shown for each team is the same as they registered from the first round. Match list sorted by zone. All times are WIB (UTC+7).

Number of teams per tier still in competition
| Liga 1 | Liga 2 | Liga 3 | Total |
|---|---|---|---|
| 17 / 18 | 10 / 24 | 5 / 86 | 32 / 128 |

First leg

| 30 January 2019 West 1 | Sriwijaya (1) | 6–2 | PS Keluarga USU (3) | Palembang, South Sumatra |
| 15:00 | Budiyono 7', 26'; Rizky 48'; Yogi 59'; Musafri 72', 74' | Report | Riki 29', 89' | Stadium: Gelora Sriwijaya Stadium; Referee: Mustofa Umarella |

| 23 January 2019 West 1 | Persija (1) | 8–2 | 757 Kepri Jaya (3) | Bekasi, West Java |
| 15:00 | Šimić 14', 27', 40', 64', 69'; Matos 36'; Novri 38'; Bambang 87' | Report | Azis 50'; Nanang 56' | Stadium: Patriot Candrabhaga Stadium; Referee: Fariq Hitaba |

| 24 January 2019 West 1 | PSBL (3) | 1–2 | Bhayangkara (1) | Langsa, Aceh |
| 16:00 | Arif 7' | Report | Dzumafo 51' (pen.); Wirahadi 89' | Stadium: Langsa Stadium; Referee: Rihendra Purba |

| 25 January 2019 West 1 | Semen Padang (2) | 1–2 | TIRA-Persikabo (1) | Padang, West Sumatra |
| 15:00 | Pulatov 32' | Report | Sansan 15'; Guntur 69' (pen.) | Stadium: Haji Agus Salim Stadium; Referee: Nusur Fadilah |

| 5 February 2019 West 2 | PSIS (1) | 2–0 | Persibat (2) | Magelang, Central Java |
| 15:00 | Septian 32'; Bayu 41' | Report | | Stadium: Moch. Soebroto Stadium; Referee: Dwi Susilo |
Note: This match was originally a second leg match.

| 29 January 2019 West 2 | Madura United (1) | 2–0 | Cilegon United (2) | Pamekasan, East Java |
| 19:00 | Vermansyah 65'; Rakić 84' (pen.) | Report | | Stadium: Gelora Ratu Pamelingan Stadium; Referee: Oki Dwi Putra |

| 27 January 2019 West 2 | Persiwa (2) | 0–0 | Persib (1) | Cilacap, Central Java |
| 15:00 | | Report | | Stadium: Wijayakusuma Stadium; Referee: Ikhsan Prasetya Jati |

| 26 January 2019 West 2 | Arema (1) | 4–1 | Persita (2) | Malang, East Java |
| 15:00 | Gladiador 6', 78'; Dedik 11'; Hamka 17' | Report | Waskito 59' | Stadium: Kanjuruhan Stadium; Referee: Untung |

| 9 February 2019 East 1 | Persinga (3) | cancelled | Persebaya (1) | Ngawi, East Java |
| 15:00 | | | | Stadium: Ketonggo Stadium |
Note: This match was originally scheduled on 22 January 2019 but it was postponed because they didn't get police permit to hold the match in Ketonggo Stadium, Ngawi. This match already postponed for four times (from 22 January to 30 January, then 5 February, and lastly 9 February). And finally it was decided that this match would not be held.

| 23 January 2019 East 1 | Barito Putera (1) | 1–2 | PSS (2) | Martapura, South Kalimantan |
| 15:00 | Samsul 35' | Report | Kushedya 19', 48' | Stadium: Demang Lehman Stadium; Referee: Abdul Rahman Salasa |

| 24 January 2019 East 1 | Blitar United (2) | 0–3 | Bali United (1) | Blitar, East Java |
| 19:00 | | Report | Spasojević 10'; Platje 31', 64' (pen.) | Stadium: Gelora Supriyadi Stadium; Referee: Maulana Nugraha |

| 25 January 2019 East 1 | Persela (1) | 3–1 | Persik Kendal (2) | Lamongan, East Java |
| 19:00 | Dendy 45+3'; Hambali 71'; Risaldi 78' | Report | Ardiansyah 80' | Stadium: Surajaya Stadium; Referee: Agus Fauzan |

| 29 January 2019 East 2 | PSMP (2) | 1–3 | Borneo (1) | Mojokerto, East Java |
| 15:00 | Pellu 17' | Report | Michiels 11'; Lerby 21'; Lasut 69' | Stadium: Gajahmada Stadium; Referee: Adi Riyanto |

| 27 January 2019 East 2 | Perseru (1) | 0–0 | Mitra Kukar (1) | Serui, Papua |
| 13:00 | | Report | | Stadium: Marora Stadium; Referee: Ahmad Tuharea |

| 28 January 2019 East 2 | Persidago (3) | 1–0 | Persipura (1) | Gorontalo, Gorontalo |
| 14:00 | Ismunandar 67' | Report | | Stadium: January 23rd Stadium |

| 26 January 2019 East 2 | Kalteng Putra (2) | 1–2 | PSM (1) | Palangka Raya, Central Kalimantan |
| 15:00 | Sukadana 34' (pen.) | Report | Zulham 57'; Pluim 81' | Stadium: Tuah Pahoe Stadium; Referee: Bachrul Ulum |

Second leg

| 7 February 2019 West 1 | PS Keluarga USU (3) | 1–1 (3–7 agg.) | Sriwijaya (1) | Medan, North Sumatra |
| 15:00 | Yowanda 89' | Report | Andes 25' | Stadium: Mini USU Stadium; Referee: Faulur Rossy |

| 31 January 2019 West 1 | 757 Kepri Jaya (3) | 1–1 (3–9 agg.) | Persija (1) | Batam, Riau Islands |
| 15:00 | Lutfi 42' | Report | Ismed 45' | Stadium: Gelora Citramas Stadium; Referee: Aprisman Aranda |

| 1 February 2019 West 1 | Bhayangkara (1) | 4–3 (6–4 agg.) | PSBL (3) | Kebayoran Baru, Jakarta |
| 15:00 | Dzumafo 14', 19'; Indra 52'; Alsan 84' | Report | Riza 37'; Khalidi 55'; Jajang 70' (o.g.) | Stadium: PTIK Stadium; Referee: Bachrul Ulum |

| 2 February 2019 West 1 | TIRA-Persikabo (1) | 2–0 (4–1 agg.) | Semen Padang (2) | Cibinong, West Java |
| 19:00 | Arnaud 53'; Wawan 68' | Report | | Stadium: Pakansari Stadium; Referee: Dodi Setia Purnama |

| 8 February 2019 West 2 | Persibat (2) | 2–5 (2–7 agg.) | PSIS (1) | Batang, Central Java |
| 15:00 | Hapidin 1', 16' (pen.) | Report | Hari Nur 2', 11', 38'; Bayu 7'; Fauzan 29' (pen.) | Stadium: Moh Sarengat Stadium; Referee: Hamim Tohari |
Note: This match was originally scheduled on 28 January 2019 and was a first leg match, but it was postponed because Moh Sarengat Stadium was flooded.

| 6 February 2019 West 2 | Cilegon United (2) | 1–1 (1–3 agg.) | Madura United (1) | Cilegon, Banten |
| 15:00 | Dedi 43' | Report | Greg 51' | Stadium: Krakatau Steel Stadium; Referee: Kuspriyanto |

| 11 February 2019 West 2 | Persib (1) | 7–0 (7–0 agg.) | Persiwa (2) | Bandung, West Java |
| 15:00 | N'Douassel 16', 38', 55'; Lopičić 51' (pen.); Vizcarra 65'; Beckham 79'; Ghozali 90' | Report | | Stadium: Jalak Harupat Stadium; Referee: Handri Kristanto |
Note: This match was originally scheduled on 4 February 2019 at Gelora Bandung Lautan Api Stadium but it was postponed because they didn't have police permit for infrastructure security factors there.

| 3 February 2019 West 2 | Persita (2) | 0–3 (1–7 agg.) | Arema (1) | Tangerang, Banten |
| 19:00 | | Report | Konaté 24'; Gladiador 77'; Nur Hardianto 90+5' | Stadium: Benteng Taruna Stadium; Referee: Moch. Adung |

| 16 February 2019 East 1 | Persebaya (1) | 8–0 (8–0 agg.) | Persinga (3) | Surabaya, East Java |
| 16:00 | Baldé 1', 23', 48', 61'; Jaya 13', 69'; Dzhalilov 79'; Irwan 90+1' | Report | | Stadium: Gelora Bung Tomo Stadium; Referee: Rully Ruslin Tambutina |
Note: This match was originally scheduled on 7 February 2019. But later, it became just single match instead of two-legged match.

| 31 January 2019 East 1 | PSS (2) | 3–3 (5–4 agg.) | Barito Putera (1) | Sleman, Special Region of Yogyakarta |
| 19:00 | Saimima 19'; Kambuaya 42'; Tuharea 81' (pen.) | Report | Prisca 33'; Lucas 70' (pen.); Yakob 86' | Stadium: Maguwoharjo Stadium; Referee: Prasetyo Hadi |

| 1 February 2019 East 1 | Bali United (1) | 4–0 (7–0 agg.) | Blitar United (2) | Gianyar, Bali |
| 18:00 | Platje 8'; Bachdim 14'; Spasojević 51' (pen.), 87' | Report | | Stadium: Kapten I Wayan Dipta Stadium; Referee: Abdul Rahman Salasa |

| 2 February 2019 East 1 | Persik Kendal (2) | 1–0 (2–3 agg.) | Persela (1) | Kendal, Central Java |
| 15:00 | Akshay 90' | Report | | Stadium: Kebondalem Stadium; Referee: Nendi Rohaendi |

| 6 February 2019 East 2 | Borneo (1) | 6–0 (9–1 agg.) | PSMP (2) | Samarinda, East Kalimantan |
| 19:00 | Hamisi 20'; Asri 35'; Umanailo 45+2'; Terens 59'; Lerby 73'; Michiels 89' | Report | | Stadium: Segiri Stadium; Referee: Abdul Rahman Salasa |

| 4 February 2019 East 2 | Mitra Kukar (1) | 1–4 (1–4 agg.) | Perseru (1) | Tenggarong, East Kalimantan |
| 15:00 | Aldino 78' | Report | Escobar 36', 58', 85'; Raweyai 56' | Stadium: Aji Imbut Stadium; Referee: Djumadi Effendi |

| 8 February 2019 East 2 | Persipura (1) | 2–1 (2–2 (a) agg.) | Persidago (3) | Jayapura, Papua |
| 13:00 | Boaz 40'; Tjoe 84' | Report | Panto 37' | Stadium: Mandala Stadium; Referee: Tommy Manggopa |
Note: This match was originally scheduled on 5 February 2019 but it was postponed because it coincides with the great day of the gospel entered in the Land of Papua.

| 3 February 2019 East 2 | PSM (1) | 1–0 (3–1 agg.) | Kalteng Putra (2) | Makassar, South Sulawesi |
| 15:00 | Markkanen 68' | Report | | Stadium: Andi Mattalata Stadium; Referee: Iwan Sukoco |

=== Round of 16 ===
For the round of 16, the first legs was played from 15 to 19 February 2019 and the second from 20 to 24 February 2019. Match list sorted by zone. All times are WIB (UTC+7).

Number of teams per tier still in competition
| Liga 1 | Liga 2 | Liga 3 | Total |
|---|---|---|---|
| 14 / 18 | 1 / 24 | 1 / 86 | 16 / 128 |

First leg

| 19 February 2019 West | Bhayangkara (1) | 1–1 | PSIS (1) | Kebayoran Baru, Jakarta |
| 19:00 | Anderson 90+6' | Report | Bayu 47' | Stadium: PTIK Stadium; Referee: Annas Apriliandi |

| 17 February 2019 West | Madura United (1) | 5–0 | Sriwijaya (1) | Pamekasan, East Java |
| 19:00 | Jaimerson 13'; Vermansyah 20', 72'; Greg 30'; Rakić 90+2' | Report | | Stadium: Gelora Ratu Pamelingan Stadium; Referee: Abdul Rahman Salasa |

| 18 February 2019 West | Persib (1) | 1–1 | Arema (1) | Bandung, West Java |
| 15:00 | Erwin 69' | Report | Rafli 75' | Stadium: Jalak Harupat Stadium; Referee: Dwi Purba |

| 17 February 2019 West | TIRA-Persikabo (1) | 2–2 | Persija (1) | Cibinong, West Java |
| 15:00 | Arnaud 37'; Ciro 44' | Report | Matos 39', 79' (pen.) | Stadium: Pakansari Stadium; Referee: Aprisman Aranda |

| 15 February 2019 East | Borneo (1) | 1–0 | PSS (2) | Samarinda, East Kalimantan |
| 19:00 | Lerby 27' (pen.) | Report | | Stadium: Segiri Stadium; Referee: Prasetyo Hadi |

| 19 February 2019 East | Persidago (3) | 1–4 | Persebaya (1) | Gorontalo, Gorontalo |
| 14:00 | Panto 90+1' (pen.) | Report | Irwan 49'; Dzhalilov 73'; Baldé 84', 90+3' | Stadium: January 23rd Stadium; Referee: Ahmad Tuharea |

| 16 February 2019 East | PSM (1) | 9–0 | Perseru (1) | Makassar, South Sulawesi |
| 14:00 | Markkanen 9', 24', 36', 45+2'; Zulham 31', 33', 38'; Ferdinand 80'; Gatra 89' | Report | | Stadium: Andi Mattalata Stadium; Referee: Tabrani |

| 18 February 2019 East | Persela (1) | 0–1 | Bali United (1) | Lamongan, East Java |
| 19:00 | | Report | Jairo 34' (o.g.) | Stadium: Surajaya Stadium; Referee: Nusur Fadilah |

Second leg

| 24 February 2019 West | PSIS (1) | 1–4 (2–5 agg.) | Bhayangkara (1) | Magelang, Central Java |
| 15:00 | Hari Nur 7' | Report | Anderson 24', 86'; Dendy 54'; Lee Yoo-joon 64' | Stadium: Moch. Soebroto Stadium; Referee: Yudi Nurcahya |

| 21 February 2019 West | Sriwijaya (1) | 1–2 (1–7 agg.) | Madura United (1) | Palembang, South Sumatra |
| 15:00 | Wicaksana 47' | Report | Rakić 9'; Gonçalves 53' | Stadium: Gelora Sriwijaya Stadium; Referee: Mustofa Umarella |

| 22 February 2019 West | Arema (1) | 2–2 (3–3 (a) agg.) | Persib (1) | Malang, East Java |
| 15:00 | Konaté 3'; Gladiador 73' | Report | N'Douassel 45+2' (pen.); Ghozali 85' | Stadium: Kanjuruhan Stadium; Referee: Ikhsan Prasetya Jati |

| 21 February 2019 West | Persija (1) | 2–0 (4–2 agg.) | TIRA-Persikabo (1) | Bekasi, West Java |
| 15:00 | Fitra 2'; Ryuji 73' | Report | | Stadium: Patriot Candrabhaga Stadium; Referee: Adi Riyanto |

| 20 February 2019 East | PSS (2) | 0–0 (0–1 agg.) | Borneo (1) | Sleman, Special Region of Yogyakarta |
| 19:00 | | Report | | Stadium: Maguwoharjo Stadium; Referee: Iwan Sukoco |

| 23 February 2019 East | Persebaya (1) | 7–0 (11–1 agg.) | Persidago (3) | Surabaya, East Java |
| 15:00 | Baldé 27', 29', 56', 87'; Dutra 34'; Hansamu 37'; Lizio 45+1' | Report | | Stadium: Gelora Bung Tomo Stadium; Referee: Fariq Hitaba |

| 20 February 2019 East | Perseru (1) | 0–3 (0–12 agg.) | PSM (1) | Makassar, South Sulawesi |
| 15:00 | | Report | Ferdinand 19', 63'; Gatra 59' | Stadium: Andi Mattalata Stadium; Referee: Bachrul Ulum |
Note: This match was supposed to be held in Marora Stadium, Serui. But financial problem make Perseru choose to play the second leg match at Makassar.

| 22 February 2019 East | Bali United (1) | 2–0 (3–0 agg.) | Persela (1) | Gianyar, Bali |
| 19:00 | Fadil 25', 79' | Report | | Stadium: Kapten I Wayan Dipta Stadium; Referee: Handri Kristanto |

== Final stage ==
=== Bracket ===
Quarter-finals
Bali United | 2 | 0 | 2
Persija (a) | 1 | 1 | 2
Borneo (a) | 2 | 2 | 4
Persib | 1 | 3 | 4
Bhayangkara | 4 | 0 | 4
PSM (a) | 2 | 2 | 4
Persebaya | 1 | 1 | 2
Madura United | 1 | 2 | 3

Semi-finals
Persija | 2 | 1 | 3
Borneo | 1 | 1 | 2
PSM (a) | 1 | 1 | 2
Madura United | 0 | 2 | 2

Finals
Persija | 1 | 0 | 1
PSM | 0 | 2 | 2

=== Quarter-finals ===
For the quarter-finals, the first legs was played from 24 April – 19 June 2019 and the second from 3 May – 27 June 2019. All times are WIB (UTC+7).

First leg

| 26 April 2019 | Bali United (1) | 2–1 | Persija (1) | Gianyar, Bali |
| 15:30 | Lilipaly 52', 80' | Report | Bambang 85' | Stadium: Kapten I Wayan Dipta Stadium; Referee: Oki Dwi Putra |

| 24 April 2019 | Borneo (1) | 2–1 | Persib (1) | Samarinda, East Kalimantan |
| 15:30 | Conti 40'; Asri 90+2' | Report | N'Douassel 16' | Stadium: Segiri Stadium; Referee: Agus Fauzan Arifin |

| 27 April 2019 | Bhayangkara (1) | 4–2 | PSM (1) | Kebayoran Baru, Jakarta |
| 15:30 | Iskandar 11'; Dendy 16'; Mofu 66'; Dzumafo 89' | Report | Pluim 40'; Zulham 64' | Stadium: PTIK Stadium; Referee: Yudi Nurcahya |

| 19 June 2019 | Persebaya (1) | 1–1 | Madura United (1) | Surabaya, East Java |
| 16:00 | Haay 54' | Report | Rakić 3' | Stadium: Gelora Bung Tomo Stadium; Referee: Fariq Hitaba |
Note: This match was originally scheduled on 25 April 2019 but it was postponed to 19 June 2019 as the two teams competed did not earn police permit to hold the match because the police were more focused on securing 2019 Indonesian general election.

Second leg

| 5 May 2019 | Persija (1) | 1–0 (2–2 (a) agg.) | Bali United (1) | Cikarang, West Java |
| 15:30 | Ismed 59' (pen.) | Report | | Stadium: Wibawa Mukti Stadium; Referee: Handri Kristanto |
Note: This match was originally scheduled on 4 May 2019 at Patriot Candrabhaga Stadium, Bekasi. But for some reason, it was postponed to 5 May 2019 and held at Wibawa Mukti Stadium, Cikarang.

| 4 May 2019 | Persib (1) | 3–2 (4–4 (a) agg.) | Borneo (1) | Bandung, West Java |
| 15:30 | Ghozali 5'; N'Douassel 86' (pen.); Supardi 90+4' | Report | Guseynov 69'; Lerby 90+1' | Stadium: Jalak Harupat Stadium; Referee: Fariq Hitaba |
Note: This match was originally scheduled on 29 April 2019 but it was postponed to 4 May 2019 as they didn't get police permit to hold the match because the police focus on securing 2019 Indonesian general election and May Day.

| 3 May 2019 | PSM (1) | 2–0 (4–4 (a) agg.) | Bhayangkara (1) | Makassar, South Sulawesi |
| 15:30 | Rachmat 30'; Rizky 56' | Report | | Stadium: Andi Mattalata Stadium; Referee: Nusur Fadilah |

| 27 June 2019 | Madura United (1) | 2–1 (3–2 agg.) | Persebaya (1) | Pamekasan, East Java |
| 15:30 | Gonçalves 6', 22' | Report | Lizio 20' | Stadium: Gelora Madura; Referee: Dodi Setia Purnama |
Note: This match was originally scheduled on 30 April 2019 but it was postponed to 27 June 2019 as the two teams competed did not earn police permit to hold the match because the police were more focused on securing 2019 Indonesian general election.

=== Semi-finals ===
For the semi-finals, the first legs was played from 29 to 30 June and the second from 6–7 July 2019. All times are WIB (UTC+7).

First leg

| 29 June 2019 | Persija (1) | 2–1 | Borneo (1) | Cikarang, West Java |
| 15:30 | Nasadit 2'; Bambang 90+6' | Report | Terens 38' | Stadium: Wibawa Mukti Stadium; Referee: Wawan Rapiko |

| 30 June 2019 | PSM (1) | 1–0 | Madura United (1) | Makassar, South Sulawesi |
| 15:30 | Zulham 37' | Report | | Stadium: Andi Mattalata Stadium; Referee: Dwi Purba |

Second leg

| 6 July 2019 | Borneo (1) | 1–1 (2–3 agg.) | Persija (1) | Samarinda, East Kalimantan |
| 15:30 | Silva 59' | Report | Ismed 33' | Stadium: Segiri Stadium; Referee: Rully Ruslin Tambutina |

| 7 July 2019 | Madura United (1) | 2–1 (2–2 (a) agg.) | PSM (1) | Pamekasan, East Java |
| 15:30 | Rakić 33' (pen.); Greg 58' | Report | Evans 83' | Stadium: Gelora Madura; Referee: Dwi Susilo |

=== Finals ===
21 July 2019
15:30

| Persija | 1–0 | PSM |
|---|---|---|
| Ryuji 87' | Report |

Gelora Bung Karno Stadium, Jakarta
Attendance: 70,306
Referee: Dwi Purba
6 August 2019 (Note: The PSM v Persija match, originally scheduled on 28 July 2019, 15:30 UTC+7, was postponed to 8 August 2019 due to an attack on the Persija team bus when several players and officials were injured.)
15:30

| PSM | 2–0 | Persija |
|---|---|---|
| Evans 3'; Zulham 49' | Report |

Andi Mattalata Stadium, Makassar
Attendance: 14,997
Referee: Fariq Hitaba

PSM won 2–1 on aggregate.

== Statistics ==
=== Top goalscorers ===
| Rank | Player | Team | Goals |
|---|---|---|---|
| 1 | (Guinea-Bissau) Amido Baldé | Persebaya | 10 |
| 1 | (Indonesia) Zulham Zamrun | PSM | 10 |
| 3 | (Indonesia) Herman Dzumafo | Bhayangkara | 7 |
| 5 | (Indonesia) Dendy Sulistyawan | Bhayangkara (3), Persela (3) | 6 |
| 5 | (Chad) Ezechiel N'Douassel | Persib | 6 |
| 7 | (Indonesia) Lerby Eliandry | Borneo | 5 |
| 7 | (Serbia) Aleksandar Rakić | Madura United | 5 |
| 7 | (Croatia) Marko Šimić | Persija | 5 |
| 7 | (Finland) Eero Markkanen | PSM | 5 |

=== Awards ===
- Best young player was awarded to Asnawi Bahar (PSM).
- Best player was awarded to Zulham Zamrun (PSM).
- Top scorer were awarded to Amido Baldé (Persebaya) and Zulham Zamrun (PSM) with 10 goals each.
- Fair play team was awarded to Madura United.

== See also ==
- 2018 Liga 1
- 2018 Liga 2
- 2018 Liga 3
- 2019 Liga 1
- 2019 Liga 2
- 2019 Liga 3
