= 2018 Indonesia President's Cup =

Piala Presiden 2018

Tournament details
- Country: Indonesia
- Dates: 16 January – 17 February 2018
- Teams: 20

Final positions
- Champions: Persija
- Runners-up: Bali United
- Third place: Sriwijaya
- Fourth place: PSMS

Tournament statistics
- Matches played: 40
- Goals scored: 114 (2.85 per match)
- Attendance: 423,114 (10,578 per match)
- Top goal scorer(s): Marko Šimić (11 goals)

Awards
- Best player: Marko Šimić (Persija)
- Best young player: Rezaldi Hehanusa (Persija)

The 2018 Indonesia President's Cup (Indonesian: Piala Presiden 2018) was the third edition of Indonesia President's Cup, held by the Football Association of Indonesia (PSSI) as a pre-season tournament for the 2018 Liga 1. The tournament started on 16 January and ended on 17 February 2018.

The broadcasting rights were granted to Elang Mahkota Teknologi group; matches were aired by their channels: Indosiar and O-Channel.

The 2018 Indonesia President's Cup Final was played at the Gelora Bung Karno Stadium in Jakarta, with Persija defeating Bali United by 3–0 to win their first title. Arema were the title holders, but they were eliminated by Sriwijaya in the quarter-finals.

== Teams ==
Initially, the tournament was planned to be competed by 20 teams: 18 teams from 2018 Liga 1 and 2 best placed teams from 2017 Liga 2. Then, Persipura Jayapura decided not to participate in this year's tournament. Kalteng Putra was confirmed to replace them.

Club	2017 season	City	Province
Arema	Liga 1 9th place	Malang	East Java
Bali United	Liga 1 runner-up	Gianyar	Bali
Barito Putera	Liga 1 7th place	Banjarmasin	South Kalimantan
Bhayangkara	Liga 1 champions	Bekasi	West Java
Borneo	Liga 1 8th place	Samarinda	East Kalimantan
Kalteng Putra	Liga 2 3rd in Group X	Palangka Raya	Central Kalimantan
Madura United	Liga 1 5th place	Pamekasan	East Java
Martapura	Liga 2 4th place	Martapura	South Kalimantan
Mitra Kukar	Liga 1 10th place	Tenggarong	East Kalimantan
Persebaya	Liga 2 champions	Surabaya	East Java
Persela	Liga 1 14th place	Lamongan	East Java
Perseru	Liga 1 15th place	Serui	Papua
Persib	Liga 1 13th place	Bandung	West Java
Persija	Liga 1 4th place	Jakarta	DKI Jakarta
PS TNI	Liga 1 12th place	Cibinong	West Java
PSIS	Liga 2 3rd place	Semarang	Central Java
PSM	Liga 1 3rd place	Makassar	South Sulawesi
PSMS	Liga 2 runner-up	Medan	North Sumatra
PSPS Riau	Liga 2 3rd in Group Y	Pekanbaru	Riau
Sriwijaya	Liga 1 11th place	Palembang	South Sumatra

== Draw ==
The 20 teams were divided into five groups. Each group consisted of four teams.

Group A
Pos	Team
A1	Persib (hosts)
A2	PSM
A3	PSMS
A4	Sriwijaya

Group B
Pos	Team
B1	Mitra Kukar (hosts)
B2	Kalteng Putra
B3	Martapura
B4	Barito Putera

Group C
Pos	Team
C1	Persebaya (Host)
C2	Madura United
C3	Perseru
C4	PS TNI

Group D
Pos	Team
D1	Bali United (hosts)
D2	Persija
D3	PSPS
D4	Borneo

Group E
Pos	Team
E1	Arema (hosts)
E2	Bhayangkara
E3	PSIS
E4	Persela

== Venues ==
Seven venues in seven cities were selected for the tournament. On 21 January 2018, the venue of Group E officially moved from Gajayana Stadium to Kanjuruhan Stadium after two matches because the pitch of Gajayana was heavily damaged by bad weather and bad drainage.

Location of stadiums used;
Blue: Final and Third place playoff Green: Quarter-finals and Semi-finals Yellow: Group Stage.

Bandung, West Java	Tenggarong, East Kalimantan	Surabaya, East Java
Gelora Bandung Lautan Api	Aji Imbut	Gelora Bung Tomo
Capacity: 38,000	Capacity: 35,000	Capacity: 55,000
Gianyar, Bali	Malang, East Java	Malang Regency, East Java
Kapten I Wayan Dipta	Gajayana	Kanjuruhan
Capacity: 25,000	Capacity: 35,000	Capacity: 42,449
Surakarta, Central Java	Palembang, South Sumatra	Special Capital Region of Jakarta
Manahan	Gelora Sriwijaya	Gelora Bung Karno
Capacity: 25,000	Capacity: 23,000	Capacity: 77,193

== Regulations ==
Player registration regulations are as follows:

- Clubs can register at least 18 players and a maximum of 36 players;
- Clubs are required to register 7 players under the age of 23 (born on or after 1 January 1996);
- Clubs can register a maximum of 6 foreign players, including one slot for a player from AFC countries. But only 4 foreign players (3+1 Asia) are eligible in a match;
- Player registration is opened from 10 January 2018 until a day before the first match of each group.

== Group stage ==
The Organising Committee (OC) announced the group draw on 9 January 2018. The group draw was determined by the host, the team's ranking in the 2017 Liga 1 competition, geographical factors, and commercial interests.

=== Group A ===
Pos	Team	Pld	W	D	L	GF	GA	GD	Pts	Qualification
1	Sriwijaya	3	2	0	1	5	1	+4	6	Advance to quarter-finals
2	PSMS	3	2	0	1	4	3	+1	6	Advance to quarter-finals
3	Persib (H)	3	1	0	2	1	3	−2	3	
4	PSM	3	1	0	2	2	5	−3	3	

Source: Piala Presiden 2018
Rules for classification: 1) Points; 2) Goal difference; 3) Goals scored; 4) Head-to-head; 5) Drawing.
(H) Hosts
- All matches played in Bandung, West Java
- Times listed are local (UTC+7:00)
16 January 2018
15:30

Persib	1–0	Sriwijaya
Oh In-kyun 55'	Report

Gelora Bandung Lautan Api Stadium, Bandung
Attendance: 25,747
Referee: Djumadi Effendi
16 January 2018
19:30

PSM	1–2	PSMS
Guy 19'	Report	Suhandi 38'; Antony 66'

Gelora Bandung Lautan Api Stadium, Bandung
Attendance: 2,306
Referee: Adi Riyanto

21 January 2018
15:30

Sriwijaya	3–0	PSM
Adam 8'; Konaté 89' (pen.); Dzhalilov 90+4'	Report

Gelora Bandung Lautan Api Stadium, Bandung
Attendance: 29,676
Referee: Yeni Krisdianto
21 January 2018
19:30

PSMS	2–0	Persib
Frets 26'; Antony 30'	Report

Gelora Bandung Lautan Api Stadium, Bandung
Attendance: 29,676
Referee: Musthofa Umarella

26 January 2018
15:30

PSMS	0–2	Sriwijaya
	Report	Sibatuara 53' (o.g.); Konaté 76' (pen.)

Gelora Bandung Lautan Api Stadium, Bandung
Attendance: 8,571
Referee: Ikhsan Prasetya Jati
26 January 2018
19:30

Persib	0–1	PSM
	Report	Zulkifli (yellow card) 52' (yellow-red card) 54'; Djite 58'

Gelora Bandung Lautan Api Stadium, Bandung
Attendance: 23,837
Referee: Handri Kristanto

=== Group B ===
Pos	Team	Pld	W	D	L	GF	GA	GD	Pts	Qualification
1	Mitra Kukar (H)	3	3	0	0	4	0	+4	9	Advance to quarter-finals
2	Barito Putera	3	1	1	1	5	4	+1	4	
3	Kalteng Putra	3	1	1	1	3	3	0	4	
4	Martapura	3	0	0	3	3	8	−5	0	

Source: Piala Presiden 2018
Rules for classification: 1) Points; 2) Goal difference; 3) Goals scored; 4) Head-to-head; 5) Drawing.
(H) Hosts
- All matches played in Tenggarong, East Kalimantan
- Times listed are local (UTC+8:00)
17 January 2018
16:30

Mitra Kukar	2–0	Martapura
Rodríguez 43', 48'	Report

Aji Imbut Stadium, Tenggarong
Attendance: 2,150
Referee: Prasetyo Hadi
17 January 2018
20:30

Barito Putera	1–1	Kalteng Putra
Rifqi 75'	Report	Rumere 69'

Aji Imbut Stadium, Tenggarong
Attendance: 286
Referee: Asep Yandis

22 January 2018
16:30

Martapura	2–4	Barito Putera
Bissa 13', 55'	Report	Samsul 2', 45'; Ady 66'; Pora 69'

Aji Imbut Stadium, Tenggarong
Attendance: 127
Referee: Bachrul Ulum
22 January 2018
20:30

Kalteng Putra	0–1	Mitra Kukar
	Report	Hendra 41'

Aji Imbut Stadium, Tenggarong
Attendance: 1,281
Referee: Abdul Rahman Salasa

27 January 2018
16:30

Mitra Kukar	1–0	Barito Putera
Rodríguez 45+1' (pen.)	Report

Aji Imbut Stadium, Tenggarong
Attendance: 1,805
Referee: Thoriq Alkatiri
27 January 2018
20:30

Kalteng Putra	2–1	Martapura
Dadang 42'; Rumere 75'	Report	Qischil 68'

Aji Imbut Stadium, Tenggarong
Attendance: 92
Referee: Untung

=== Group C ===
Pos	Team	Pld	W	D	L	GF	GA	GD	Pts	Qualification
1	Persebaya (H)	3	2	1	0	4	1	+3	7	Advance to quarter-finals
2	Madura United	3	2	0	1	8	2	+6	6	Advance to quarter-finals
3	PS TNI	3	1	1	1	6	6	0	4	
4	Perseru	3	0	0	3	2	11	−9	0	

Source: Piala Presiden 2018
Rules for classification: 1) Points; 2) Goal difference; 3) Goals scored; 4) Head-to-head; 5) Drawing.
(H) Hosts
- All matches played in Surabaya, East Java
- Times listed are local (UTC+7:00)
18 January 2018
15:30

Persebaya	1–1	PS TNI
Miswar (red card) 16'; Pahabol 76'	Report	Manahati 68'

Gelora Bung Tomo Stadium, Surabaya
Attendance: 13,200
Referee: Novari Ikhsan
18 January 2018
19:30

Madura United	5–0	Perseru
Nwokolo 14', 72'; Bayu 41'; Gonzáles 79'; Maitimo 82'	Report

Gelora Bung Tomo Stadium, Surabaya
Referee: Jerry Elly

23 January 2018
15:30

PS TNI	1–3	Madura United
Martins 26'	Report	Gatra 18'; Nwokolo 59'; Gonzáles 90+2'

Gelora Bung Tomo Stadium, Surabaya
Attendance: 10,325
Referee: Dwi Purba
23 January 2018
19:30

Perseru	0–2	Persebaya
	Report	Rishadi 42'; Irfan 90+3'

Gelora Bung Tomo Stadium, Surabaya
Referee: Muslimin

28 January 2018
15:30

Persebaya	1–0	Madura United
Pahabol 30'	Report

Gelora Bung Tomo Stadium, Surabaya
Attendance: 50,000
Referee: Yudi Nurcahya
28 January 2018
19:30

Perseru	2–4	PS TNI
Escobar 2', 66'	Report	Manahati 9' (pen.); Dani 14', 54'; Martins 79'

Gelora Bung Tomo Stadium, Surabaya
Attendance: 100
Referee: Nusur Fadilah

=== Group D ===
Pos	Team	Pld	W	D	L	GF	GA	GD	Pts	Qualification
1	Bali United (H)	3	3	0	0	9	6	+3	9	Advance to quarter-finals
2	Persija	3	2	0	1	7	3	+4	6	Advance to quarter-finals
3	Borneo	3	1	0	2	5	5	0	3	
4	PSPS Riau	3	0	0	3	2	9	−7	0	

Source: Piala Presiden 2018
Rules for classification: 1) Points; 2) Goal difference; 3) Goals scored; 4) Head-to-head; 5) Drawing.
(H) Hosts
- All matches played in Gianyar, Bali
- Times listed are local (UTC+8:00)
19 January 2018
16:30

Bali United	3–2	Borneo
Lilipaly 66', 82' (pen.), 90+2'	Report	Marković 45+3'; Araújo 87'

Kapten I Wayan Dipta Stadium, Gianyar
Attendance: 4,795
Referee: Rully Ruslin Tambutina
19 January 2018
20:30

Persija	3–0	PSPS Riau
Šimić 25'; Ismed 52' (pen.); Bambang 86'	Report

Kapten I Wayan Dipta Stadium, Gianyar
Referee: Tabrani

24 January 2018
16:30

PSPS Riau	2–3	Bali United
Wahyu 12'; Abanda 52'	Report	Martinus 8'; Sukarja 22'; Azka 72'

Kapten I Wayan Dipta Stadium, Gianyar
Attendance: 1,957
Referee: Iwan Sukoco
24 January 2018
20:30

Borneo	0–2	Persija
	Report	Šimić 38' (pen.), 77'

Kapten I Wayan Dipta Stadium, Gianyar
Attendance: 557
Referee: Aprisman Aranda

29 January 2018
16:30

PSPS Riau	0–3	Borneo
	Report	Womsiwor 40'; Boaz 53'; Marković 90+3' (pen.)

Kapten I Wayan Dipta Stadium, Gianyar
Attendance: 189
Referee: Adi Riyanto
29 January 2018
20:30

Bali United	3–2	Persija
Spasojević 9'; Brands 25' (pen.); Lilipaly 54' (pen.)	Report	Ivan Carlos 56' (pen.); Jaime 66'

Kapten I Wayan Dipta Stadium, Gianyar
Attendance: 19,578
Referee: Prasetyo Hadi

=== Group E ===
Pos	Team	Pld	W	D	L	GF	GA	GD	Pts	Qualification
1	Arema (H)	3	1	2	0	5	3	+2	5	Advance to quarter-finals
2	Bhayangkara	3	1	2	0	2	1	+1	5	
3	PSIS	3	1	0	2	2	4	−2	3	
4	Persela	3	0	2	1	3	4	−1	2	

Source: Piala Presiden 2018
Rules for classification: 1) Points; 2) Goal difference; 3) Goals scored; 4) Head-to-head; 5) Drawing.
(H) Hosts
- Two matches played in Malang and four matches played in Malang Regency, East Java
- Times listed are local (UTC+7:00)
20 January 2018
15:30

Bhayangkara	1–0	PSIS
Jajang 68'	Report

Gajayana Stadium, Malang
Attendance: 1,461
Referee: Dodi Setia Purnama
20 January 2018
19:30

Arema	2–2	Persela
Furtuoso 2'; Dendi 12'	Report	Celin 80'; Zaenuri 90+3' (o.g.)

Gajayana Stadium, Malang
Attendance: 19,930
Referee: Untung

25 January 2018
15:30

Persela	1–1	Bhayangkara
Sugeng 80'	Report	Dzumafo 34'

Kanjuruhan Stadium, Malang Regency
Attendance: 1,393
Referee: Rihendra Purba
25 January 2018
19:30

PSIS	1–3	Arema
Hari 69'	Report	Rio Saputro 4' (o.g.); Johan 8'; Furtuoso 47'

Kanjuruhan Stadium, Malang Regency
Attendance: 8,093
Referee: Faulur Rosy

30 January 2018
15:30

PSIS	1–0	Persela
Bayu 56'	Report

Kanjuruhan Stadium, Malang Regency
Attendance: 843
Referee: Oki Dwi Putra
30 January 2018
19:30

Arema	0–0	Bhayangkara
	Report

Kanjuruhan Stadium, Malang Regency
Attendance: 20,879
Referee: Annas Apriliandi

=== Ranking of runner-up teams ===
Pos	Grp	Team	Pld	W	D	L	GF	GA	GD	Pts	Qualification
1	C	Madura United	3	2	0	1	8	2	+6	6	Advance to quarter-finals
2	D	Persija	3	2	0	1	7	3	+4	6	Advance to quarter-finals
3	A	PSMS	3	2	0	1	4	3	+1	6	Advance to quarter-finals
4	E	Bhayangkara	3	1	2	0	2	1	+1	5	
5	B	Barito Putera	3	1	1	1	5	4	+1	4	

Source: Group stage
Rules for classification: 1) Points; 2) Goal difference; 3) Goals scored; 4) Drawing.

== Knockout stage ==
Extra time would not be played in the quarter-finals. If a match ended with a draw, it would go straight to a penalty shoot-out to determine the winner. The away goals rule, extra time and penalty shoot-out would be used in the semi-finals, if necessary. The third place match would also go straight to a penalty shoot-out if tied after normal playing time. Extra time and penalty shoot-out would also be used in the final, if necessary.

=== Bracket ===
Quarter-finals
3 February – Surakarta
Persebaya	3 (3)
PSMS (p)	3 (4)
4 February – Surakarta
Mitra Kukar	1
Persija	3
4 February – Surakarta
Sriwijaya	3
Arema	1
3 February – Surakarta
Bali United (p)	2 (5)
Madura United	2 (4)

Semi-finals
10/12 February
PSMS	1	0	1
Persija	4	1	5
11/14 February
Sriwijaya	0	0	0
Bali United	0	1	1

Final
17 February – Jakarta
Persija	3
Bali United	0
Third place
17 February – Jakarta
PSMS	0
Sriwijaya	4

=== Quarter-finals ===
The draw for the quarter-finals was held at Sultan Hotel, Jakarta, on 31 January 2018.

3 February 2018
15:30 UTC+7

Persebaya	3–3	PSMS
Irfan 33' (pen.); Pahabol 66'; Alom 69'	Report	Yessoh 5'; Urikhob 42'; Frets 46'
Penalties
Misbakus (penalty scored); Imbiri (penalty scored); Pahabol (penalty missed); Abu Rizal (penalty missed); Dutra (penalty missed); Oktafianus (penalty scored); Haay (penalty missed)	3–4	(penalty missed) Lobo; (penalty scored) Legimin; (penalty scored) Yessoh; (penalty missed) Urikhob; (penalty missed) Frets; (penalty scored) Suhandi; (penalty scored) Abdul Aziz

Manahan Stadium, Surakarta
Attendance: 22,184
Referee: Thoriq Alkatiri

3 February 2018
19:30 UTC+7

Bali United	2–2	Madura United
Lilipaly 25' (pen.); Agung 68'	Report	Nwokolo 7'; Fabiano 45+1' (pen.)
Penalties
Lilipaly (penalty scored); Brands (penalty scored); Fadil (penalty scored); Taufiq (penalty scored); Van der Velden (penalty scored)	5–4	(penalty scored) Beny; (penalty missed) Sacramento; (penalty scored) Sani; (penalty scored) John; (penalty scored) Fabiano

Manahan Stadium, Surakarta
Attendance: 6,100
Referee: Musthofa Umarella

4 February 2018
15:30 UTC+7

Mitra Kukar	1–3	Persija
Rodríguez 72'	Report	Šimić 20', 45+1'; Bambang 87'

Manahan Stadium, Surakarta
Attendance: 21,315
Referee: Oki Dwi Putra

4 February 2018
19:30 UTC+7

Sriwijaya	3–1	Arema
Paulin 67'; Abimanyu 71'; Beto 85'	Report	Hardianto 83' (pen.)

Manahan Stadium, Surakarta
Attendance: 18,450
Referee: Dodi Setia Purnama

=== Semi-finals ===
10 February 2018
19:30 UTC+7

PSMS	1–4	Persija
Yessoh 41'	Report	Šimić 4', 12', 74'; Jaime 15'

Manahan Stadium, Surakarta
Attendance: 22,320
Referee: Djumadi Effendi
12 February 2018
14:30 UTC+7

Persija	1–0	PSMS
Šimić 60'	Report

Manahan Stadium, Surakarta
Attendance: 6,978
Referee: Yudi Nurcahya

Persija won 5–1 on aggregate.

11 February 2018
19:30 UTC+7

Sriwijaya	0–0	Bali United
	Report

Gelora Sriwijaya Stadium, Palembang
Attendance: 22,000
Referee: Oki Dwi Putra
14 February 2018
20:30 UTC+8

Bali United	1–0	Sriwijaya
Demerson 81'	Report

Kapten I Wayan Dipta Stadium, Gianyar
Attendance: 17,474
Referee: Faulur Rosy

Bali United won 1–0 on aggregate.

=== Third place ===
17 February 2018
15:30 UTC+7

PSMS	0–4	Sriwijaya
	Report	N'Diaye 45+1'; Hamka 53'; Dzhalilov 76'; Vizcarra 87'

Gelora Bung Karno Stadium, Jakarta
Attendance: 68,272
Referee: Musthofa Umarella

=== Final ===
17 February 2018
19:30 UTC+7

Persija	3–0	Bali United
Šimić 20', 45+2'; Novri 63'	Report

Gelora Bung Karno Stadium, Jakarta
Attendance: 70,255
Referee: Oki Dwi Putra

== Statistics ==
=== Goalscorers ===
There were 114 goals scored in 40 matches, for an average of 2.85 goals per match.

11 goals

- (Croatia) Marko Šimić

5 goals

- (Indonesia) Stefano Lilipaly

4 goals

- (Indonesia) Greg Nwokolo
- (Spain) Fernando Rodríguez

3 goals

- (Indonesia) Yohanes Pahabol

2 goals

- (Brazil) Jaime Xavier
- (Brazil) Thiago Furtuoso
- (Indonesia) Ahmad Nufiandani
- (Indonesia) Antoni Nugroho
- (Indonesia) Bambang Pamungkas
- (Indonesia) Bayu Gatra
- (Indonesia) Cristian Gonzáles
- (Indonesia) Frets Butuan
- (Indonesia) Irfan Jaya
- (Indonesia) Manahati Lestusen
- (Indonesia) Michael Rumere
- (Indonesia) Samsul Arif
- (Ivory Coast) Donald Bissa
- (Ivory Coast) Wilfried Yessoh
- (Mali) Makan Konaté
- (Montenegro) Stevan Marković
- (Paraguay) Sílvio Escobar
- (Portugal) Élio Martins
- (Tajikistan) Manuchekhr Dzhalilov

1 goal

- (Australia) Bruce Djite
- (Argentina) Esteban Vizcarra
- (Brazil) Beto Gonçalves
- (Brazil) Alessandro Celin
- (Brazil) André Araújo
- (Brazil) Demerson
- (Brazil) Fabiano Beltrame
- (Brazil) Ivan Carlos
- (Indonesia) Abdul Abanda Rahman
- (Indonesia) Adam Alis
- (Indonesia) Ady Setiawan
- (Indonesia) Ahmad Agung
- (Indonesia) Ahmad Hardianto
- (Indonesia) Azka Fauzi
- (Indonesia) Bayu Nugroho
- (Indonesia) Bio Paulin
- (Indonesia) Boaz Solossa
- (Indonesia) Dadang Apridianto
- (Indonesia) Dendi Santoso
- (Indonesia) Friska Womsiwor
- (Indonesia) Guy Junior Ondoua
- (Indonesia) Hamka Hamzah
- (Indonesia) Hari Nur Yulianto
- (Indonesia) Hendra Bayauw
- (Indonesia) Herman Dzumafo
- (Indonesia) I Nyoman Sukarja
- (Indonesia) Ilija Spasojević
- (Indonesia) Ismed Sofyan
- (Indonesia) Jajang Mulyana
- (Indonesia) Johan Alfarizi
- (Indonesia) Martinus Novianto
- (Indonesia) Muhammad Rifqi
- (Indonesia) Nelson Alom
- (Indonesia) Novri Setiawan
- (Indonesia) Qischil Minny
- (Indonesia) Raphael Maitimo
- (Indonesia) Rishadi Fauzi
- (Indonesia) Rizky Pora
- (Indonesia) Sugeng Efendi
- (Indonesia) Suhandi
- (Indonesia) Syahrian Abimanyu
- (Indonesia) Wahyu Kristanto
- (Mali) Mahamadou N'Diaye
- (Namibia) Sadney Urikhob
- (Netherlands) Kevin Brands
- (South Korea) Oh In-kyun

1 own goal

- (Indonesia) Mochammad Zaenuri (against Persela)
- (Indonesia) Rio Saputro (against Arema)
- (Indonesia) Samuel Sibatuara (against Sriwijaya)

=== Awards ===
- Best supporters: Bobotoh (Persib)
- Best referee: Oki Dwi Putra
- Top scorer and best player: Marko Šimić (Persija, 11 goals)
- Best young player: Rezaldi Hehanusa (Persija)
- Fair-play award: Bali United

=== Tournament team rankings ===
As per statistical convention in football, matches decided in extra time were counted as wins and losses, while matches decided by penalty shoot-outs were counted as draws.

Pos	Grp	Team	Pld	W	D	L	GF	GA	GD	Pts	Final result
1	D	Persija	7	6	0	1	18	5	+13	18	Champion
2	D	Bali United	7	4	2	1	12	11	+1	14	Runner-up
3	A	Sriwijaya	7	4	1	2	12	3	+9	13	Third place
4	A	PSMS	7	2	1	4	8	15	−7	7	Fourth place
5	B	Mitra Kukar	4	3	0	1	5	3	+2	9	Eliminated in the quarter-finals
6	C	Persebaya	4	2	2	0	7	4	+3	8	Eliminated in the quarter-finals
7	C	Madura United	4	2	1	1	10	4	+6	7	Eliminated in the quarter-finals
8	E	Arema	4	1	2	1	6	6	0	5	Eliminated in the quarter-finals
9	E	Bhayangkara	3	1	2	0	2	1	+1	5	Eliminated in the group stage
10	B	Barito Putera	3	1	1	1	5	4	+1	4	Eliminated in the group stage
11	C	PS TNI	3	1	1	1	6	6	0	4	Eliminated in the group stage
12	B	Kalteng Putra	3	1	1	1	3	3	0	4	Eliminated in the group stage
13	D	Borneo	3	1	0	2	5	5	0	3	Eliminated in the group stage
14	E	PSIS	3	1	0	2	2	4	−2	3	Eliminated in the group stage
15	A	Persib	3	1	0	2	1	3	−2	3	Eliminated in the group stage
16	A	PSM	3	1	0	2	2	5	−3	3	Eliminated in the group stage
17	E	Persela	3	0	2	1	3	4	−1	2	Eliminated in the group stage
18	B	Martapura	3	0	0	3	3	8	−5	0	Eliminated in the group stage
19	D	PSPS Riau	3	0	0	3	2	9	−7	0	Eliminated in the group stage
20	C	Perseru	3	0	0	3	2	11	−9	0	Eliminated in the group stage

Source: Group stage, Knockout stage

== See also ==
- 2018 Liga 1
- 2018 Liga 2
- 2018 Liga 3
- 2018–19 Piala Indonesia
