= Nugroho =

Nugroho is an Indonesian surname. Notable people with the surname include:

- Adi Nugroho (born 1992), Indonesian footballer
- Anggun Nugroho (born 1982), Indonesian badminton player
- Bayu Nugroho (born 1999), Indonesian footballer
- Garin Nugroho (born 1961), Indonesian film director
- Priska Madelyn Nugroho (born 2003), Indonesian tennis player
