= Mandowen =

Mandowen is a Papuan surname. Notable people with the surname include:

- Gunansar Mandowen (born 2000), Indonesian professional footballer
- Lukas Mandowen (born 1989), Indonesian professional footballer
