= 2018 Indonesia President's Cup final =

- Event: 2018 Indonesia President's Cup
Persija Jakarta	Bali United
3	0
- Date: 17 February 2018
- Venue: Gelora Bung Karno Stadium, Jakarta
- Man of the Match: Marko Šimić (Persija Jakarta)
- Referee: Oki Dwi Putra
- Attendance: 70,255

The 2018 Indonesia President's Cup final was the final match of the 2018 Indonesia President's Cup, the 3rd season of Indonesia's pre-season premier club football tournament organised by PSSI. It was played at the Gelora Bung Karno Stadium in Jakarta on 17 February 2018 and contested between Persija Jakarta and Bali United, their second encounter in the competition after their first in the group stage.

Persija defeated Bali 3–0, winning the President's Cup title in their history.

== Road to the final ==
Note: In all results below, the score of the finalist is given first (H: home; A: away).

Persija Jakarta				Round	Bali United			
Opponent	Result			Group stage	Opponent	Result		
PSPS Riau	3–0 (H)			Matchday 1	Borneo	3–2 (H)		
Borneo	2–0 (A)			Matchday 2	PSPS Riau	3–2 (A)		
Bali United	2–3 (A)			Matchday 3	Persija Jakarta	3–2 (H)		
Group D runners-up: Pos / Team / Pld / Pts; 1 / Bali United / 3 / 9; 2 / Persija Jakarta / 3 / 6; 3 / Borneo / 3 / 3; 4 / PSPS Riau / 3 / 0; Source: Piala Presiden 2018				Final standings	Group D winners: Pos / Team / Pld / Pts; 1 / Bali United / 3 / 9; 2 / Persija Jakarta / 3 / 6; 3 / Borneo / 3 / 3; 4 / PSPS Riau / 3 / 0; Source: Piala Presiden 2018			
Opponent	Agg.	1st leg	2nd leg	Knockout stage	Opponent	Agg.	1st leg	2nd leg
Mitra Kukar	3–1 (A)			Quarter-finals	Madura United	2–2 (5–4 p) (H)		
PSMS	5–1	4–1 (A)	1–0 (H)	Semi-finals	Sriwijaya	1–0	0–0 (A)	1–0 (H)

== Match ==
=== Details ===
17 February 2018
19:30 UTC+7

Persija Jakarta	3–0	Bali United
Šimić 20', 45+2'; Novri 63'	Report

Gelora Bung Karno Stadium, Jakarta
Attendance: 70,255
Referee: Oki Dwi Putra

Persija Jakarta	Bali United

GK	26	(Indonesia) Andritany Ardhiyasa
RB	14	(Indonesia) Ismed Sofyan (c)
CB	5	(Brazil) Jaime Xavier
CB	6	(Indonesia) Maman Abdurrahman	(substituted off) 90'
LB	11	(Indonesia) Novri Setiawan
CM	32	(Nepal) Rohit Chand	(substituted off) 86'
CM	29	(Indonesia) Sandi Sute
RW	25	(Indonesia) Riko Simanjuntak	(substituted off) 90'
AM	7	(Indonesia) Ramdani Lestaluhu	(substituted off) 83'
LW	28	(Indonesia) Rezaldi Hehanusa
CF	9	(Croatia) Marko Šimić	(substituted off) 86'
Substitutes:
GK	30	(Indonesia) Rizky Darmawan
DF	13	(Indonesia) Gunawan Dwi Cahyo	(substituted on) 90'
MF	16	(Indonesia) Asri Akbar
MF	23	(Indonesia) Nugroho Fatchurahman	(substituted on) 86'
MF	27	(Indonesia) Fitra Ridwan	(substituted on) 83'
FW	10	(Indonesia) Rudi Widodo	(substituted on) 90'
FW	20	(Indonesia) Bambang Pamungkas	(substituted on) 86'
Coach:
(Brazil) Teco

Persija Jakarta (4–3–3)
Bali United (4–4–2)

GK	59	(Indonesia) Wawan Hendrawan
RB	33	(Indonesia) I Made Andhika Wijaya
CB	34	(Brazil) Demerson		(substituted off) 79'
CB	32	(South Korea) Ahn Byung-keon		(substituted off) 55'
LB	24	(Indonesia) Ricky Fajrin
RM	87	(Indonesia) Stefano Lilipaly
CM	8	(Indonesia) Muhammad Taufiq		(substituted off) 61'
CM	14	(Indonesia) Fadil Sausu (c)
LM	11	(Indonesia) Yabes Roni		(substituted off) 61'
SS	23	(Netherlands) Nick van der Velden
CF	9	(Indonesia) Ilija Spasojević	(yellow card) 68'
Substitutes:
GK	21	(Indonesia) I Made Wardana
DF	22	(Indonesia) Dias Angga Putra
DF	27	(Indonesia) Agus Nova
MF	44	(Indonesia) I Gede Sukadana		(substituted on) 79'
MF	48	(Indonesia) Ahmad Agung	(yellow card) 57'	(substituted on) 55'
FW	7	(Indonesia) Miftahul Hamdi		(substituted on) 61'
FW	10	(Indonesia) Irfan Bachdim		(substituted on) 61'
Coach:
(Austria) Hans-Peter Schaller

Man of the Match:
Marko Šimić (Persija Jakarta)

Assistant referees:
Nurhadi
Bambang Syamsudar
Fourth official:
Yudi Nurcahya

Match rules

- 90 minutes.
- 30 minutes of extra time if necessary.
- Penalty shoot-out if scores still level.
- Seven named substitutes, of which up to six may be used.
