= 2018 Liga 3 West Java =

Liga 3 Jawa Barat
- Season: 2018
- Champions: PSKC Cimahi

The 2018 Liga 3 West Java (known as Liga 3 Super Jalapa (Jago Bola Pasundan)) is the third edition of Liga 3 (formerly known as Liga Nusantara) West Java as a qualifying round for the national round of 2018 Liga 3. PSKC Cimahi, winner of the 2017 Liga 3 West Java are the defending champions. The competition started on 29 April 2018.

== Format ==
In this competition, 42 teams are divided into 6 groups of seven. The two best teams are through to knockout stage. The winner will represent West Java in national round of 2018 Liga 3.

== Teams ==
There are initially 42 clubs which will participate the league in this season. But it became 41 after Bone F.C. withdraw before their first match.

== Group stage ==
This stage scheduled starts on 29 April 2018. Result of this stage: 29/04,30/04a,30/04b,02/05a,02/05b,03/05,05/05,06/05

=== Group A ===
- All matches will be held at Tambun Stadium, Bekasi

Pos	Team	Pld	W	D	L	GF	GA	GD	Pts	Qualification
1	Patriot Candrabhaga F.C.	6	6	0	0	9	2	+7	18	Advance to next round
2	Persikasi Bekasi	6	4	0	2	9	5	+4	12	Advance to next round
3	Mabor Maverick	6	1	0	5	0	3	−3	3	
4	Persipu F.C.	6	1	0	5	4	11	−7	3	
5	Bandung Timur F.C.	0	0	0	0	0	0	0	0	Withdrawn
6	Buaran Putra	0	0	0	0	0	0	0	0	Withdrawn
7	Persipasi Bekasi	0	0	0	0	0	0	0	0	Withdrawn

Updated to match(es) played on 18 July 2018. Source: MD-1MD-2

=== Group B ===
- All matches will be held at Wiradaha Stadium, Tasikmalaya

Pos	Team	Pld	W	D	L	GF	GA	GD	Pts	Qualification
1	Persikotas Tasikmalaya	8	5	1	2	24	12	+12	16	Advance to next round
2	Persitas Tasikmalaya	8	4	3	1	18	10	+8	15	Advance to next round
3	Persikoban Banjar	8	4	1	3	12	11	+1	13	
4	Perses Sumedang	8	3	2	3	14	10	+4	11	
5	Parma F.C.	8	0	1	7	2	27	−25	1	
6	Persigar Garut	0	0	0	0	0	0	0	0	Withdrawn
7	Putra Jaya F.C.	0	0	0	0	0	0	0	0	Withdrawn

Updated to match(es) played on 18 July 2018. Source: MD-1MD-2MD-3

=== Group C ===
- All matches will be held at Anda S. Dipura Stadium, Karawang

Pos	Team	Pld	W	D	L	GF	GA	GD	Pts	Qualification
1	Benpica F.C.	6	4	1	1	12	4	+8	13	Advance to next round
2	Persipo Purwakarta	6	4	1	1	11	8	+3	13	Advance to next round
3	Roksi F.C.	6	1	1	4	6	7	−1	4	
4	Loreng F.C.	6	1	1	4	6	16	−10	4	
5	Blaster Kujang	0	0	0	0	0	0	0	0	Withdrawn
6	Persikas Subang	0	0	0	0	0	0	0	0	Withdrawn

Updated to match(es) played on 18 July 2018. Source: MD-1MD-2MD-3

=== Group D ===
- All matches will be held at Angkasa Lanud Sulaeman Stadium, Bandung

Pos	Team	Pld	W	D	L	GF	GA	GD	Pts	Qualification
1	PSKC Cimahi	12	9	2	1	26	9	+17	29	Advance to next round
2	Maung Anom	12	9	1	2	37	5	+32	28	Advance to next round
3	Persikab Bandung	12	7	3	2	27	14	+13	24	
4	Fearless Rambo F.C.	12	4	4	4	11	16	−5	16	
5	Cimahi Putra	12	3	2	7	12	18	−6	11	
6	Primacon F.C.	12	1	3	8	12	20	−8	6	
7	Bintang Muda	12	0	1	11	8	41	−33	1	

Updated to match(es) played on 18 July 2018. Source: MD-1MD-2MD-3

=== Group E ===
- All matches will be held at Warung Jambu Stadium, Majalengka

Pos	Team	Pld	W	D	L	GF	GA	GD	Pts	Qualification
1	Pesik Kuningan	12	7	3	2	27	14	+13	24	Advance to next round
2	Super Progresif F.C.	12	7	3	2	18	9	+9	24	Advance to next round
3	PSGJ Cirebon	12	6	3	3	35	16	+19	21	
4	Persindra Indramayu	12	5	3	4	21	12	+9	18	
5	Persima Majalengka	12	4	3	5	17	14	+3	15	
6	PSIT Cirebon	12	4	2	6	22	26	−4	14	
7	Bina Putra	12	0	1	11	9	68	−59	1	

Updated to match(es) played on 18 July 2018. Source: MD-1MD-2MD-3

=== Group F ===
- All matches will be held at KONI Stadium, Citeureup

Pos	Team	Pld	W	D	L	GF	GA	GD	Pts	Qualification
1	Perssi Sukabumi	6	4	0	2	11	4	+7	12	Advance to next round
2	Citeureup Raya F.C.	6	3	2	1	10	7	+3	11	Advance to next round
3	Bintang Timur	6	2	2	2	11	9	+2	8	
4	Kabomania	6	0	2	4	5	17	−12	2	
5	Gapura F.C.	0	0	0	0	0	0	0	0	Withdrawn
6	PSB Bogor	0	0	0	0	0	0	0	0	Withdrawn
7	Persikabumi Sukabumi	0	0	0	0	0	0	0	0	Withdrawn

Updated to match(es) played on 18 July 2018. Source: MD-1MD-2MD-3
