= Arif Setiawan =

Indonesian footballer (born 1998)

Personal information
- Full name: Arif Setiawan
- Date of birth: 4 September 1998 (age 28)
- Place of birth: Banda Aceh, Indonesia
- Height: 1.73 m (5 ft 8 in)
- Position: Left-back

Team information
- Current team: Garudayaksa
- Number: 31

Senior career*
Years	Team	Apps	(Gls)
2016–2018	PSBL Langsa	8	(0)
2019–2021	Bhayangkara	10	(0)
2020	→ Persik Kediri (loan)	0	(0)
2021	Dewa United	4	(0)
2022–2025	Persita Tangerang	40	(0)
2023–2024	→ Persiraja Banda Aceh (loan)	16	(0)
2025–2026	PSMS Medan	23	(1)
2026–	Garudayaksa	0	(0)
- * Club domestic league appearances and goals as of 2 May 2026

Arif Setiawan (born 4 September 1998) is an Indonesian professional footballer who plays as a left-back for Super League club Garudayaksa.

== Club career ==
=== Bhayangkara FC ===
He was signed for Bhayangkara to play in the Liga 1 in the 2019 season. Arif made his league debut on 5 August 2019 in a match against Madura United at the PTIK Stadium, Jakarta.

==== Persik Kediri (loan) ====
He was signed for Persik Kediri to play in the Liga 1 in the 2020 season, on loan from Bhayangkara. This season was suspended on 27 March 2020 due to the COVID-19 pandemic. The season was abandoned and was declared void on 20 January 2021.

=== Dewa United ===
In 2021, Arif Setiawan signed a contract with Indonesian Liga 2 club Dewa United. He made his league debut on 28 September against RANS Cilegon at the Gelora Bung Karno Madya Stadium, Jakarta.

=== Persita Tengerang ===
Arif was signed for Persita Tangerang to play in Liga 1 in the 2022–23 season. He made his league debut on 25 July 2022 in a match against Persik Kediri at the Indomilk Arena, Tangerang. On 6 June 2025, Arif officially left Persita Tangerang.

== Honours ==
=== Club ===
Dewa United

- Liga 2 third place (play-offs): 2021
