= Abdul Rachman =

Indonesian footballer (born 1988)

Personal information
- Full name: Abdul Rachman
- Date of birth: 30 January 1988 (age 38)
- Place of birth: North Penajam Paser, Indonesia
- Height: 1.69 m (5 ft 7 in)
- Position: Left-back

Team information
- Current team: Persiba Balikpapan
- Number: 7

Senior career*
| Years | Team | Apps | (Gls) |
| 2010–2013 | Bontang | 29 | (2) |
| 2014 | Persiba Balikpapan | 7 | (0) |
| 2015 | Martapura | 0 | (0) |
| 2016 | Persiba Balikpapan | 19 | (1) |
| 2017–2021 | Borneo | 72 | (1) |
| 2021–2022 | PSM Makassar | 24 | (1) |
| 2022–2023 | Bhayangkara | 8 | (0) |
| 2023–2024 | Borneo Samarinda | 0 | (0) |
| 2023–2024 | → Bekasi City (loan) | 7 | (0) |
| 2024– | Persiba Balikpapan | 37 | (1) |

International career
| 2016 | Indonesia | 3 | (0) |
Medal record
Men's football
Representing Indonesia
AFF Championship
| Runner-up | 2016 Myanmar & Philippines | Team |
- * Club domestic league appearances and goals as of 22:00, 8 May 2026 (UTC)

Abdul Rachman (born 30 January 1988) is an Indonesian professional footballer who plays as a left-back for Championship club Persiba Balikpapan.

== Club career ==
=== Borneo ===
He was signed for Borneo to play in Liga 1 in the 2017 season. Abdul Rachman made his debut on 29 April 2017 in a match against Persegres Gresik United. On 2 May 2017, Rachman scored his first goal for Borneo against Persipura Jayapura at the Mandala Stadium, Jayapura.

=== PSM Makassar ===
In 2021, Abdul Rachman signed a one-year contract with Indonesian Liga 1 club PSM Makassar. Rachman made his debut on 5 September 2021 as a substitute in a match against Arema. On 18 November 2021, Rachman scored his first goal for PSM against PSS Sleman at the Manahan Stadium, Surakarta.

=== Bhayangkara ===
Abdul Rachman was signed for Bhayangkara to play in Liga 1 in the 2022–23 season. He made his league debut on 31 July 2022 in a match against Persik Kediri at the Brawijaya Stadium, Kediri.

== Career statistics ==
=== International ===
As of match played 9 October 2016

Appearances and goals by national team and year
| National team | Year | Apps | Goals |
|---|---|---|---|
| Indonesia | 2016 | 3 | 0 |
| Total | | 3 | 0 |

== Honours ==
=== Club ===
Persiba Balikpapan

- Liga Nusantara Promotion play-offs: 2024–25

=== International ===
Indonesia

- AFF Championship runner-up: 2016
