= Ronaldo Wanma =

Indonesian footballer

Personal information
- Full name: Ronaldo Rubener Wanma
- Date of birth: 27 January 1998 (age 28)
- Place of birth: Jayapura, Indonesia
- Height: 1.74 m (5 ft 9 in)
- Position: Winger

Youth career
- 2016–2018: Persipura Jayapura

Senior career*
| Years | Team | Apps | (Gls) |
| 2018–2019 | Persipura Jayapura | 21 | (1) |
| 2020–2021 | Persik Kediri | 0 | (0) |
| 2021 | PSM Makassar | 0 | (0) |
| 2021–2022 | TIRA-Persikabo | 13 | (0) |
| 2022–2023 | Perserang Serang | 5 | (0) |
- * Club domestic league appearances and goals as of 1 October 2022

Ronaldo Rubener Wanma (born 27 January 1998) is an Indonesian professional footballer who plays as a winger.

== Club career ==
=== Persipura Jayapura ===
In 2018, Ronaldo Wanma promoted to the senior team. He made his debut on 24 March 2018, against Persela Lamongan in the first week Liga 1. He signed in during the 61st minute to substitute Marcel Sacramento. And Ronaldo Wanma made his first goal in his debut on 75th minute second half.

=== Persik Kediri ===
He was signed for Persik Kediri to play in Liga 1 in the 2020 season. This season was suspended on 27 March 2020 due to the COVID-19 pandemic. The season was abandoned and was declared void on 20 January 2021.

=== PSM Makassar ===
In 2021, Wanma signed a contract with Indonesian Liga 1 club PSM Makassar for 2021 Menpora Cup.

=== Persikabo 1973 ===
He was signed for Persikabo 1973 to play in Liga 1 in the 2021 season. Wanma made his league debut on 3 September 2021 as a substitute in a match against Madura United at the Indomilk Arena, Tangerang.

== Career statistics ==
=== Club ===
As of match played 1 October 2022

| Club | Season | League | | | Cup (Note: Includes Piala Indonesia.) | | Continental | | Other | | Total | |
| Club | Season | Division | Apps | Goals | Apps | Goals | Apps | Goals | Apps | Goals | Apps | Goals |
|---|---|---|---|---|---|---|---|---|---|---|---|---|
| Persipura Jayapura | 2018 | Liga 1 | 13 | 1 | 0 | 0 | 0 | 0 | 0 | 0 | 13 | 1 |
| Persipura Jayapura | 2019 | Liga 1 | 8 | 0 | 0 | 0 | 0 | 0 | 0 | 0 | 8 | 0 |
| Persipura Jayapura | Total | | 21 | 1 | 0 | 0 | 0 | 0 | 0 | 0 | 21 | 1 |
| Persik Kediri | 2020 | Liga 1 | 0 | 0 | 0 | 0 | 0 | 0 | 0 | 0 | 0 | 0 |
| PSM Makassar | 2021 | Liga 1 | 0 | 0 | 0 | 0 | 0 | 0 | 2 (Note: Appearances in Menpora Cup.) | 0 | 2 | 0 |
| Persikabo 1973 | 2021 | Liga 1 | 13 | 0 | 0 | 0 | 0 | 0 | 0 | 0 | 13 | 0 |
| Perserang Serang | 2022–23 | Liga 2 | 5 | 0 | 0 | 0 | – | | 0 | 0 | 5 | 0 |
| Career total | | | 39 | 1 | 0 | 0 | 0 | 0 | 2 | 0 | 41 | 1 |

== Honours ==
=== Club ===
Persipura U-19

- Liga 1 U-19: 2017
