= Aldo Claudio =

Indonesian footballer (born 1997)

Personal information
- Full name: Aldo Claudio
- Date of birth: 2 December 1997 (age 28)
- Place of birth: Padang, Indonesia
- Height: 1.83 m (6 ft 0 in)
- Position: Centre-back

Team information
- Current team: Garudayaksa
- Number: 27

Senior career*
Years	Team	Apps	(Gls)
2017	PS Bengkulu	10	(0)
2018	Persiwa Wamena	17	(0)
2021–2022	Persik Kediri	4	(0)
2022	Semen Padang	3	(0)
2023–2025	PSKC Cimahi	19	(0)
2025–2026	Persiku Kudus	16	(0)
2026–	Garudayaksa	0	(0)
- * Club domestic league appearances and goals as of 12 September 2026

Aldo Claudio (born 2 December 1997) is an Indonesian professional footballer who plays as a centre-back for Super League club Garudayaksa.

== Club career ==
=== PS Bengkulu ===
He was signed for PS Bengkulu to play in Liga 2 in the 2017 season.

=== Persiwa Wamena ===
In 2018, Claudio signed a one-year contract with Indonesian Liga 2 club Persiwa Wamena.

=== Persik Kediri ===
In 2021, Claudio signed for Persik Kediri to play in Liga 1 in the 2021 season. He made his league debut on 27 August 2021, in a 1–0 loss against Bali United as substitute at the Gelora Bung Karno Stadium, Jakarta.

=== Semen Padang ===
Claudio was signed for Semen Padang to play in Liga 2 in the 2022–23 season. He made his league debut on 29 August 2022 in a match against PSPS Riau at the Riau Main Stadium, Riau.

== Career statistics ==
=== Club ===
As of match played 12 September 2026

Club	Season	League			Cup		Continental		Other		Total	
Club	Season	Division	Apps	Goals	Apps	Goals	Apps	Goals	Apps	Goals	Apps	Goals
PS Bengkulu	Liga 2	2017	10	0	0	0	–		0	0	10	0
Persiwa Wamena	Liga 2	2018	17	0	0	0	–		0	0	17	0
Persik Kediri	Liga 1	2021	4	0	0	0	–		2 (Note: Appearances in Menpora Cup.)	0	6	0
Semen Padang	Liga 2	2022–23	3	0	0	0	–		0	0	3	0
PSKC Cimahi	Liga 2	2023–24	4	0	0	0	–		0	0	4	0
PSKC Cimahi	Liga 2	2024–25	15	0	0	0	–		0	0	15	0
Persiku Kudus	Championship	2025–26	15	0	0	0	–		0	0	15	0
Persiku Kudus	Championship	2026–27	1	0	0	0	–		0	0	1	0
Career total			69	0	0	0	0	0	2	0	71	0
