= Guntur Triaji =

Indonesian footballer

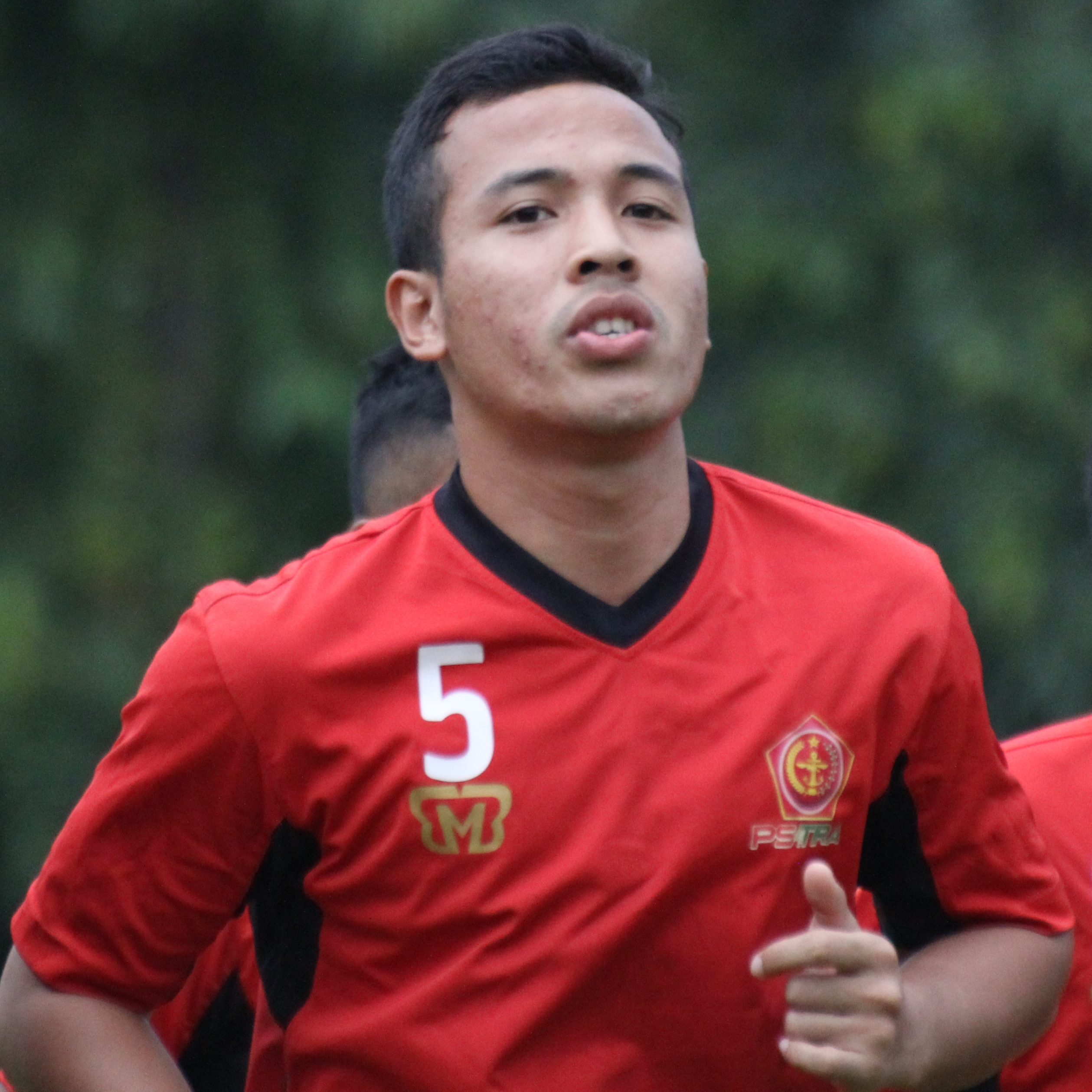
- Guntur with TIRA-Persikabo in 2019

Personal information
- Full name: Muhamad Guntur Triaji
- Date of birth: 30 July 1993 (age 33)
- Place of birth: South Lampung, Indonesia
- Height: 1.68 m (5 ft 6 in)
- Position: Midfielder

Youth career
- 2010–2011: PSBL Bandar Lampung
- 2012: Persija U21

Senior career*
Years	Team	Apps	(Gls)
2011–2012	Persiraja Banda Aceh	15	(2)
2014–2015	Persija Jakarta	10	(0)
2014	→ Villa 2000 (loan)	6	(1)
2015–2017	Persikabo 1973	40	(1)
2017–2019	Persela Lamongan	26	(2)
2019–2024	Persikabo 1973	61	(0)
2022	→ PSIS Semarang (loan)	10	(0)
2023–2024	→ PSMS Medan (loan)	12	(0)
2024	Dejan	4	(1)
2024–2025	Gresik United	5	(0)
2026	Persma 1960	6	(0)
- * Club domestic league appearances and goals as of 19 April 2026

Muhamad Guntur Triaji (born 30 July 1993) is an Indonesian professional footballer who plays as a midfielder.

== Club career ==
=== PS TNI ===
Guntur was selected to represent Indonesia in 2011 through a national and regional selection process in September and October 2010. He joined TNI for the 2016 Indonesia Soccer Championship A. In the seventh week, Guntur made his first goal against Persipura Jayapura.

=== Persela Lamongan ===
He was signed for Persela Lamongan to play in Liga 1 in the 2018 season. Guntur made his debut on 24 March 2018 in a match against Persipura Jayapura. On 16 April 2018, Triaji scored his first goal for Persela against Bali United in the 38th minute at the Surajaya Stadium, Lamongan.

=== TIRA-Persikabo/Persikabo 1973 ===
In 2019, Guntur Triaji signed a contract with Indonesian Liga 1 club TIRA-Persikabo. He made his league debut on 18 May 2019 in a match against Badak Lampung at the Pakansari Stadium, Cibinong.

=== PSIS Semarang (loan) ===
Guntur was loaned for PSIS Semarang to play in Liga 1 in the 2022–23 season. On 30 July 2022, Guntur made his league debut for the club in a 1–2 lose over Arema at Kanjuruhan Stadium.

== Personal life ==
On 20 November 2022, Guntur married his girlfriend, Della Adisty Handayani, Della Adisty is an Indonesian archery athlete. She has participated in various world championships, she is also the son of the best female archer in Indonesia, Lilies Handayani. Guntur officially married her in a wedding ceremony held in Surabaya, East Java.
