= Boas Isir =

Indonesian association footballer

Personal information
- Full name: Habel Boas Inzaghi Isir
- Date of birth: 24 June 1999 (age 27)
- Place of birth: Jayapura, Indonesia
- Height: 1.82 m (6 ft 0 in)
- Position: Centre back

Youth career
- 2016–2017: Persipura Jayapura

Senior career*
| Years | Team | Apps | (Gls) |
| 2018 | Perseru Serui | 18 | (1) |
| 2019 | Persewar Waropen | 14 | (2) |
| 2020 | Kalteng Putra | 1 | (0) |
| 2021 | RANS Cilegon | 2 | (0) |
| 2022–2023 | Nusantara United | 6 | (0) |
- * Club domestic league appearances and goals as of 27 September 2022

Habel Boas Inzaghi Isir (born 24 June 1999) is an Indonesian professional footballer who plays as a centre back.

== Club career ==
=== Perseru Serui ===
In 2018, Isir signed a year contract with Perseru Serui. He made his league debut on 29 April 2018 in a match against PSIS Semarang. On 9 September 2018, Isir scored his first goal for Perseru against Persipura Jayapura in the 11th minute at the Mandala Stadium, Jayapura.

=== Persewar Waropen ===
Boas Isir joined the Persewar Waropen club in the 2019 Liga 2.

=== Kalteng Putra ===
He was signed for Kalteng Putra to play in Liga 2 in the 2020 season. This season was suspended on 27 March 2020 due to the COVID-19 pandemic. The season was abandoned and was declared void on 20 January 2021.

=== RANS Cilegon ===
In 2021, Boas Isir signed a contract with Indonesian Liga 2 club RANS Cilegon. He made his league debut on 2 November 2021 in a match against Dewa United at the Gelora Bung Karno Madya Stadium, Jakarta.

== Career statistics ==
=== Club ===
As of match played 27 September 2022

| Club | Season | League | | | Cup | | Continental | | Other | | Total | |
| Club | Season | Division | Apps | Goals | Apps | Goals | Apps | Goals | Apps | Goals | Apps | Goals |
|---|---|---|---|---|---|---|---|---|---|---|---|---|
| Perseru Serui | 2018 | Liga 1 | 18 | 1 | 0 | 0 | 0 | 0 | 0 | 0 | 18 | 1 |
| Persewar Waropen | 2019 | Liga 2 | 14 | 2 | 0 | 0 | 0 | 0 | 0 | 0 | 14 | 2 |
| Kalteng Putra | 2020–21 | Liga 2 | 1 | 0 | 0 | 0 | 0 | 0 | 0 | 0 | 1 | 0 |
| RANS Cilegon | 2021 | Liga 2 | 2 | 0 | 0 | 0 | 0 | 0 | 0 | 0 | 2 | 0 |
| Nusantara United | 2022–23 | Liga 2 | 6 | 0 | 0 | 0 | – | | 0 | 0 | 6 | 0 |
| Career total | | | 41 | 3 | 0 | 0 | 0 | 0 | 0 | 0 | 41 | 3 |

== Honours ==
=== Club ===
RANS Cilegon

- Liga 2 runner-up: 2021
