= Garudayaksa F.C. =

Indonesian football club

Garudayaksa
- Full name: Garudayaksa Football Club
- Nickname: Spirit of Garuda
- Short name: GFC
- Founded: 2001; 25 years ago, as Persikoci Cimahi; 4 June 2025; 17 months ago, as Garudayaksa FC
- Ground: Pakansari Stadium
- Capacity: 30,000
- Owner: Prabowo Subianto
- President: Widjono Hardjanto
- Head coach: Miloš Joksić
- League: Super League
- 2025–26: Championship, Champions (promoted)
- Website: www.gfa-indonesia.com
Home colours	Away colours

Garudayaksa Football Club, commonly known as Garudayaksa, is an Indonesian professional football club based in Bogor Regency, West Java. They currently competes in the 2026–27 Super League next season, following promotion from the 2025–26 Championship.

== History ==
The club was founded under the name of the Persatuan Sepakbola Indonesia Kota Cimahi (simply known as Persikoci) in 2001. Then over time the name was changed to PSKC Cimahi. They have long been in the lowest-tier of the Indonesian League, until 2016. They are being the only team that won the Liga 3 West Java zone for three consecutive seasons (2017 to 2019). PSKC Cimahi is also the club with the most number of finals in Liga 3 West Java (4 times).

At the 2025 PSSI Congress, Garudayaksa Football Club was officially inaugurated as a member after acquiring PSKC Cimahi, and compete in the 2025–26 Championship season.

Regarding the sale of the club and the change of identity, this is reinforced by the official statement of the mayor of the Cimahi government which stated that the team was no longer under their control, since the privatization.

Garudayaksa Football Academy itself is founded by Prabowo Subianto, who at the time was serving as Minister of Defense. He inaugurated the academy in mid-December 2023. Garudayaksa acquired the Championship club PSKC Cimahi, and was inaugurated by PSSI. They have first competed in the 2025–26 Championship. They were promoted to the Super League for the first time in their history from next season after beating Persikad Depok 3–1 in the final matchday of Group 1, later they became champions after beating PSS Sleman 4–3 on penalties after a 2–2 draw in the final. Management confirmed that Garudayaksa, which qualified for the Super League after just its inaugural season in the Indonesian League, is not a new club. They have been competing in the second-tier competition for the past few years under the name PSKC Cimahi, and despite the name change, they retain the same management team.

Pegadaian Championship final against PSS Sleman, winning the championship title.

== Players ==
=== Current squad ===
As of 19 September 2026

Note: Flags indicate national team as defined under FIFA eligibility rules; some limited exceptions apply. Players may hold more than one non-FIFA nationality.

No.	Pos.	Nation	Player
4	DF	BRA	Paulo Ricardo
5	DF	IDN	Wahyu Prasetyo (captain)
6	MF	IDN	Theo Numberi
7	FW	IDN	Andik Vermansah (vice-captain)
8	FW	IDN	Arkhan Kaka
9	FW	MEX	Brian Rubio
10	MF	JPN	Ryo Matsumura
11	MF	CZE	Christian Frýdek
14	GK	IDN	Daffa Fasya
16	DF	IDN	Al Hamra Hehanussa (on loan from Persib Bandung)
17	FW	AUS	Carlo Armiento
18	MF	IDN	Arapenta Poerba
20	FW	IDN	Septian Bagaskara
21	MF	IDN	Adittia Gigis
22	MF	SRB	Aleksandar Busnić

No.	Pos.	Nation	Player
23	GK	IDN	Yoewanto Setya Beny
24	DF	IDN	Alfin Kelilauw
26	MF	IDN	Tristan Ibrahim (on loan from Dewa United Banten)
27	DF	IDN	Aldo Claudio
28	DF	SRB	Filip Stamenković
29	MF	IDN	Septian David Maulana
30	GK	SVK	Dominik Holec
31	DF	IDN	Arif Setiawan
33	DF	IDN	Azizu Milanesta
49	FW	IDN	Decho Zacky
56	DF	IDN	Alfriyanto Nico
70	FW	BRA	Carlos Iury (on loan from Dewa United Banten)
77	MF	IDN	Sidik Saimima
81	FW	HAI	Jayro Jean
99	MF	IDN	Muhammad Sihran

=== Out on loan ===
Note: Flags indicate national team as defined under FIFA eligibility rules; some limited exceptions apply. Players may hold more than one non-FIFA nationality.

No.	Pos.	Nation	Player
—	DF	IDN	Alfharezzi Buffon (at Dewa United Banten)

== Coaching staff ==
Position	Name
General Manager	(Indonesia) Muhammad Reza Anugerah
Team Manager	(Indonesia) Derry Hidayat
Technical Director	(Indonesia) Khamid Mulyono
Head coach	(Serbia) Miloš Joksić
Assistant coach	(Sweden) John Wall (Indonesia) Zulkifli Syukur
Goalkeeper coach	(Serbia) Milan Jovanic
Physical Coach	(Spain) Pepe Lazaro
Analyst	(Indonesia) Afton Agata

== Honours ==
As Persikoci Cimahi/PSKC Cimahi

- Liga 3 (third-tier)
  - Runners-up (1): 2019
- Liga 3 West Java Series 1
  - Champions (3): 2017, 2018, 2019
  - Runners-up (1): 2016

As Garudayaksa FC

- Championship (second-tier)
  - Champion (1): 2025–26

== Season-by-season record ==
As Persikoci Cimahi/PSKC Cimahi

Season(s)	League/Division	Tms.	Pos.	Piala Indonesia	AFC competition(s)	
2016	ISC Liga Nusantara			–	–	–
2017	Liga 3	32	Group stage	–	–	–
2018	Liga 3	32	Eliminated in Regional round	First round	–	–
2019	Liga 3	32	2	First round	–	–
2020	Liga 2	24	did not finish	–	–	–
2021–22	Liga 2	24	5th, Group B	–	–	–
2022–23	Liga 2	28	did not finish	–	–	–
2023–24	Liga 2	28	2nd, Relegation round	–	–	–
2024–25	Liga 2	26	3rd, Championship round	–	–	–

As Garudayaksa FC

Season(s)	Competition	Tier	Clubs	Position	Piala Indonesia	I-League Cup	AFC competition(s)	
2025–26	Championship	2	20	1st	–	–	–	–
2026–27	Super League	1	18	TBD	–	TBD	–	–
