= Kevin Brands =

Dutch professional footballer

Personal information
- Full name: Kevin Martinus Adrianus Brands
- Date of birth: 28 March 1988 (age 38)
- Place of birth: Waalwijk, Netherlands
- Height: 1.85 m (6 ft 1 in)
- Position: Attacking midfielder

Youth career
- RKC Waalwijk
- 2008: Den Bosch

Senior career*
Years	Team	Apps	(Gls)
2008–2011	Jong AZ	0	(0)
2009–2011	→ Telstar (loan)	60	(4)
2011–2012	Telstar	29	(9)
2012–2015	Willem II	13	(0)
2013	→ Cambuur (loan)	11	(0)
2014	→ Telstar (loan)	13	(8)
2014–2015	→ Volendam (loan)	33	(22)
2015–2016	NAC	24	(11)
2016–2017	Go Ahead Eagles	11	(1)
2017	Samsunspor	8	(2)
2017	Almere City	7	(1)
2018	Bali United	6	(0)
2018–2019	VVSB	8	(3)
2019–2020	Lampang	33	(0)
2021-2023	OJC Rosmalen	30	(6)
- * Club domestic league appearances and goals as of 3 May 2021

Kevin Martinus Adrianus Brands (born 28 March 1988) is a Dutch retired footballer who played as an attacking midfielder.

== Club career ==
He played in the youth teams of RKC and FC Den Bosch and signed a contract with AZ in January 2009, where he was included in the reserve team, Jong AZ. AZ then loaned him to Telstar. He later played for Willem II and SC Cambuur in the Eredivisie and FC Volendam and NAC Breda in the Eerste Divisie.

Brands returned to play in the Eredivisie when he joined Go Ahead Eagles on a one-year contract in summer 2016. There, he was reunited with his head coach at Volendam, Hans de Koning. His contract included an option for another season. Although he began the season as a starter, he soon lost his spot in the starting lineup and was mainly a reserve during the rest of the fall of 2016. After half a year, he was allowed to leave the club. He was subsequently on trial at Dundee in Scotland, but a move never materialised. On 17 January 2017, he joined Turkish side Samsunspor, competing in the TFF 1. Lig, the second highest Turkish league. In August 2017, Brands began playing for Almere City. In December of that year, he had his contract terminated and subsequently signed a two-year deal with Bali United in Indonesia. Brands never made an appearance in the Indonesian league for the club, but did play five matches, including one qualifying match for the AFC Champions League and four matches in the group stage of the 2018 AFC Cup. His contract was cancelled in March 2018 by the Bali United board, because he did not fit the playing style of the team. At the beginning of September 2018, he had his contract terminated and he started playing for VVSB in the third-tier Dutch Tweede Divisie. He left there in December 2018. In January 2019, Brands moved to Thai club Lampang in the second-tier Thai League 2.

== Personal life ==
Kevin is the son of former footballer and former director of football of Everton, Marcel Brands. He was diagnosed with testicular cancer in December 2021, but recovered.
