= Abdul Hamid (footballer) =

Pakistani former footballer

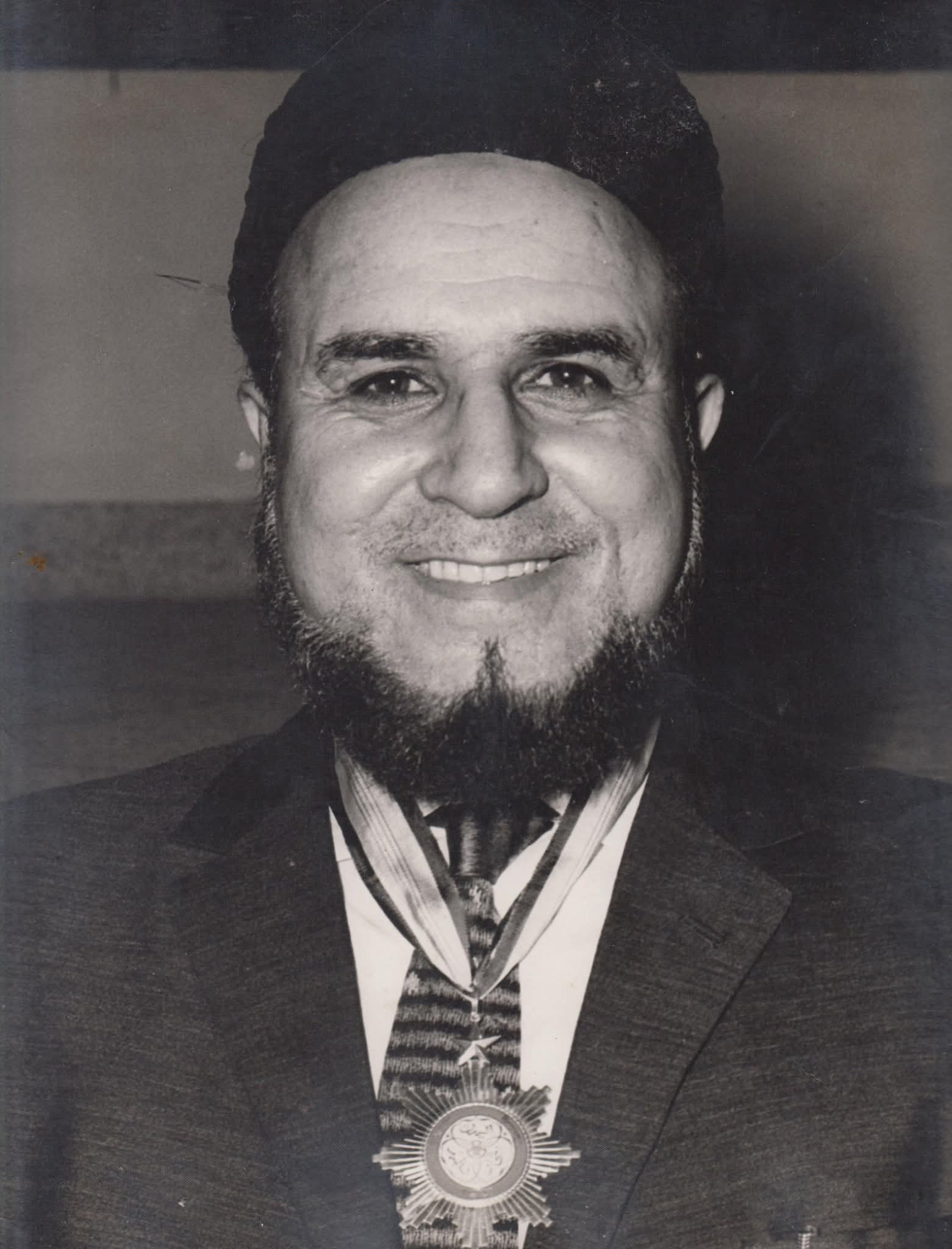
- Hamid in 1967

Personal information
- Full name: Abdul Hamid
- Date of birth: Unknown
- Place of birth: Quetta, British India
- Place of death: Unknown
- Position: Center-half

Senior career*
Years	Team	Apps	(Gls)
- Sandemanians Club
- North-Western Railway
1933–1935	Mohun Bagan		
- * Club domestic league appearances and goals

Abdul Hamid (Urdu: عبدالحمید;) was a professional footballer, who played for Mohun Bagan. Hamid was known for his leadership and abilities in defensive structures.

== Early life ==
Hamid was from Quetta, British India.

== Playing career ==
Hamid played for local school teams and college clubs, then playing for local Sandemanians Club of Quetta, notably accompanying the team for their Durand Cup participation in 1929, where he played against Mohun Bagan, defeating them in the replayed match. He also played for the North-Western Railway.

In 1933, Hamid was recruited by Calcutta Football League side, Mohun Bagan. He made his debut for the club against Sporting Union in a league match. Hamid received captainship the following year, becoming the first captain to not be from Bengal. Along with his leadership, Hamid was also a great enforcer on wearing boots, advising and inspiring his teammates to also follow. Due to his impressive performances, Hamid earned his spot in the Indians XI for the annual Indians vs Europeans event.

He also featured at several editions of the IFA Shield.

In 1934, Mohun Bagan faced up against PWD Volunteers in the IFA Shield. Just before the match, Hamid would receive a message of his late son's death. Nevertheless, Hamid would lead his team to win against their opponents 5–1.

== Personal life ==
Hamid would head over to Pakistan after the Partition of India in 1947.

In 1967, he would receive the Sitara-e-Pakistan for his immense contributions.

== Honours ==
=== Mohun Bagan ===
- Cooch Behar Cup
  - Winners (1): 1935
