= Ahmad Agung =

Indonesian professional football player

Personal information
- Full name: Ahmad Agung Setia Budi
- Date of birth: 9 March 1996 (age 30)
- Place of birth: Demak, Indonesia
- Height: 1.80 m (5 ft 11 in)
- Position: Defensive midfielder

Team information
- Current team: PSIM Yogyakarta
- Number: 52

Senior career*
Years	Team	Apps	(Gls)
2013–2014	Berlian Rajawali	12	(0)
2015–2017	PSIS Semarang	35	(3)
2018–2019	Bali United	33	(0)
2020–2021	PSM Makassar	2	(0)
2021–2022	Persik Kediri	9	(0)
2022	→ Bali United (loan)	7	(0)
2022–2023	Bali United	13	(0)
2024–2025	Persik Kediri	17	(0)
2025	→ Persib Bandung (loan)	7	(0)
2025–2026	Borneo Samarinda	11	(0)
2026–	PSIM Yogyakarta	0	(0)

International career
2021	Indonesia	1	(0)
Medal record
Men's football
Representing Indonesia
AFF Championship
Runner-up	2020 Singapore	Team
- * Club domestic league appearances and goals as of 23:12, 11 May 2026 (UTC)

Ahmad Agung Setia Budi (born 9 March 1996) is an Indonesian professional footballer who plays as a defensive midfielder for Super League club PSIM Yogyakarta.

== Club career ==
=== PSIS Semarang ===
Before joining PSIS Semarang, he played for Berlian Rajawali in the Liga Nusantara. During this time he was used regularly as starter, including in pre season matches against Persija Jakarta and Persis Solo.

=== Bali United ===
On 14 December 2017 he signed a year contract with Bali United. Agung made his league debut on 16 April 2018 as a substitute in a match against Persela Lamongan at the Surajaya Stadium, Lamongan. On 2 December 2019, Bali United won the championship for the first time in their history, becoming the seventh club to win the Liga 1 after second placed Borneo draw to PSM, followed by a win in Semen Padang, giving Bali United a 17-point lead with only four games left.

=== PSM Makassar ===
In 2020, Agung signed a contract with Indonesian Liga 1 club PSM Makassar. He made his league debut on 1 March 2020 in a match against PSS Sleman at the Andi Mattalatta Stadium, Makassar. This season was suspended on 27 March 2020 due to the COVID-19 pandemic. The season was abandoned and was declared void on 20 January 2021.

=== Persik Kediri ===
In 2020, Ahmad Agung signed for Persik Kediri to play in Liga 1 in the 2021 season. He made his league debut on 27 August 2021, in a 1–0 loss against Bali United as substitute at the Gelora Bung Karno Stadium, Jakarta.

==== Return to Bali United (loan) ====
In January 2022, Ahmad Agung signed a contract with Liga 1 club Bali United on loan from Persik Kediri. He made his league debut in a 3–0 win against Barito Putera on 9 January 2022 as a substitute for Brwa Nouri in the 85th minute at the Ngurah Rai Stadium, Denpasar.

=== Borneo Samarinda ===
On 26 June 2025, Ahmad Agung officially signed Borneo Samarinda.

== International career ==
In November 2021, Indonesian coach, Shin Tae-yong sent Agung his first call up to the full national side, for the friendly matches in Turkey against Afghanistan and Myanmar. He made his official international debut on 25 November 2021, against Myanmar in a friendly match in Antalya, Turkey.

== Career statistics ==
=== Club ===
As of match played 11 May 2026

Club	Season	League			Cup (Note: Includes Piala Indonesia)		Continental		Other		Total	
Club	Season	Division	Apps	Goals	Apps	Goals	Apps	Goals	Apps	Goals	Apps	Goals
PSIS Semarang	2015	Premier Division	0	0	0	0	—		0	0	0	0
PSIS Semarang	2016	ISC B	14	0	0	0	—		0	0	14	0
PSIS Semarang	2017	Liga 2	21	3	0	0	—		0	0	21	3
PSIS Semarang	Total		35	3	0	0	—		0	0	35	3
Bali United	2018	Liga 1	20	0	0	0	1 (Note: Appearances in AFC Cup)	0	7 (Note: Appearances in Indonesia President's Cup)	0	28	0
Bali United	2019	Liga 1	13	0	0	0	0	0	0	0	13	0
Bali United	Total		33	0	0	0	1	0	7	0	41	0
PSM Makassar	2020	Liga 1	2	0	0	0	5	0	0	0	7	0
Persik Kediri	2021–22	Liga 1	9	0	0	0	0	0	3 (Note: Appearances in Menpora Cup)	0	12	0
Bali United (loan)	2021–22	Liga 1	7	0	0	0	0	0	0	0	7	0
Bali United	2022–23	Liga 1	13	0	0	0	0	0	1	0	14	0
Persik Kediri	2023–24	Liga 1	15	0	0	0	0	0	0	0	15	0
Persik Kediri	2024–25	Liga 1	2	0	0	0	—		0	0	2	0
Persib Bandung (loan)	2024–25	Liga 1	7	0	0	0	—		0	0	7	0
Borneo Samarinda	2025–26	Super League	11	0	0	0	—		0	0	11	0
Career total			134	3	0	0	6	0	11	0	151	3

=== International ===
As of match played 25 November 2021

Appearances and goals by national team and year
National team	Year	Apps	Goals
Indonesia	2021	1	0
Total		1	0

== Honours ==
=== Club ===
PSIS Semarang

- Liga 2 third place (play-offs): 2017

Bali United

- Liga 1: 2019, 2021–22
- Indonesia President's Cup runner-up: 2018

Persib Bandung

- Liga 1: 2024–25

=== International ===
Indonesia

- AFF Championship runner-up: 2020
