= Dadang Apridianto =

Indonesian footballer

Personal information
- Full name: Dadang Apridianto
- Date of birth: 24 April 1992 (age 34)
- Place of birth: Banyuwangi, Indonesia
- Height: 1.74 m (5 ft 9 in)
- Position: Central midfielder

Youth career
- 2014: Perssu Sumenep
- 2015: PS Bungo

Senior career*
Years	Team	Apps	(Gls)
2016–2017	Persewangi Banyuwangi	17	(3)
2018–2019	Kalteng Putra	33	(2)
2020	Persela Lamongan	0	(0)
2021–2022	PSG Pati	9	(1)
2022–2023	Persita Tangerang	12	(0)
2023–2024	Kalteng Putra	8	(0)
2024–2025	Persiraja Banda Aceh	13	(0)
- * Club domestic league appearances and goals as of 18 November 2025

Dadang Apridianto (born 24 April 1992) is an Indonesian professional footballer who plays as a central midfielder.

== Club career ==
=== Persela Lamongan ===
He was signed for Persela Lamongan to play in Liga 1 in the 2020 season. This season was suspended on 27 March 2020 due to the COVID-19 pandemic. The season was abandoned and was declared void on 20 January 2021.

=== PSG Pati ===
In 2021, Dadang signed a contract with Indonesian Liga 2 club PSG Pati. He made first 2021–22 Liga 2 debut on 26 September 2021, coming on as a substitute in a 2–0 loss with Persis Solo at the Manahan Stadium, Surakarta.

=== Persita Tengerang ===
Dadang was signed for Persita Tangerang to play in Liga 1 in the 2022–23 season. He made his league debut on 14 August 2022 in a match against Persis Solo at the Indomilk Arena, Tangerang.

== Honours ==
=== Club ===
Kalteng Putra

- Liga 2 third place (play-offs): 2018
