= Michael Rumere =

Indonesian association footballer

Personal information
- Full name: Michael Bonjozi Rumere
- Date of birth: 9 December 1993 (age 32)
- Place of birth: Biak, Indonesia
- Height: 1.70 m (5 ft 7 in)
- Position: Attacking midfielder

Senior career*
| Years | Team | Apps | (Gls) |
| 2010–2017 | PSBS Biak | 40 | (5) |
| 2018–2019 | Kalteng Putra | 42 | (3) |
| 2020–2022 | Sulut United | 7 | (0) |
| 2022–2023 | Persebaya Surabaya | 14 | (1) |
| 2023–2024 | Kalteng Putra | 13 | (0) |
| 2025 | Académica | 10 | (0) |
- * Club domestic league appearances and goals

Michael Bonjozi Rumere (born 9 December 1993) is an Indonesian professional footballer who plays as an attacking midfielder.

== Club career ==
=== PSBS Biak ===
Rumere started his career as a professional football player with PSBS Biak since 2010, he played for his hometown club for 8 years. he totaled 40 matches with PSBS Biak and collected 8 goals.

=== Kalteng Putra ===
In the 2018 season, Rumere joined Kalteng Putra and managed to bring the club promotion to the highest caste of Liga 1. Rumere made his Liga 1 debut with Kalteng Putra took place in the second week of Liga 1 against Badak Lampung on 28 May 2019, he entered as a substitute when the time had entered the second half injury time, Rumere appeared in a total of 15 matches in the Liga 1.

=== Sulut United ===
He was signed for Sulut United to play in Liga 2 in the 2020 season. This season was suspended on 27 March 2020 due to the COVID-19 pandemic. The season was abandoned and was declared void on 20 January 2021.

On 6 October 2021, Rumere made his club debut by starting in a 1–1 drew against Persewar Waropen. He made seven league appearances scoring while with Sulut United.

=== Persebaya Surabaya ===
Rumere was signed for Persebaya Surabaya to play in Liga 1 in the 2022–23 season. He made his league debut on 25 July 2022 in a match against Persikabo 1973 at the Pakansari Stadium, Cibinong.

On 3 February 2023, Rumere coming on as a substituted Paulo Victor due hamstring injury, he playing as a forward for the first time, and success give assists to Altalariq Ballah in Persebaya's 3–2 win over Borneo Samarinda at Gelora Joko Samudro Stadium, Persebaya's coach, Aji Santoso gave him a permanent position, after his performance in the last few matches, Aji wanted to make him permanent at pure striker. On 13 February, Rumere came in as a starter and was trusted as a striker by the coach in the first half and scored his first league goal in a 4–2 home win against PSS Sleman.

== Honours ==
=== Club ===
Kalteng Putra

- Liga 2 third place (play-offs): 2018
