= Muhammad Rifqi =

Indonesian footballer

Personal information
- Full name: Muhammad Rifqi
- Date of birth: 6 February 1993 (age 33)
- Place of birth: Medan, Indonesia
- Height: 1.80 m (5 ft 11 in)
- Position: Defender

Senior career*
Years	Team	Apps	(Gls)
2010–2011	Sriwijaya	4	(0)
2013–2014	Pro Duta	13	(0)
2014–2016	Persegres Gresik United	26	(1)
2017–2019	Barito Putera	38	(2)
2019	Semen Padang	28	(2)
2020	PSMS Medan	1	(0)
2021	Mitra Kukar	8	(1)
2022	Persikabo 1973	3	(0)
2022–2023	Persita Tangerang	12	(0)
2023	Sriwijaya	9	(2)
2023–2024	Malut United	3	(0)
2024	Persiku Kudus	5	(0)
2025	Persikota Tangerang	5	(0)
- * Club domestic league appearances and goals as of 15 February 2025

Muhammad Rifqi (born 6 February 1993, in Medan) is an Indonesian professional footballer who plays as a defender.

== Club career ==
=== Persegres Gresik United ===
In the 2015 season, Rifqi joined Persegres Gresik United for Indonesia Super League. He made his debut on 5 April 2015 in a match against Borneo. In ISC A, he made his first goal for Gresik United when he scored against Persija Jakarta in the 1st minute.

=== Barito Putera ===
In 2017, Rifqi joined Liga 1 club Barito Putera. He made his debut on 4 July 2017 in a match against Bhayangkara. On 6 August 2017, Rifqi scored his first goal for Barito Putera in the 56th minute against Persija Jakarta.

=== Semen padang ===
In 2019, Muhammad Rifqi signed a one-year contract with Indonesian Liga 1 club Semen Padang. He made his debut on 20 May 2019 in a match against PSM Makassar. On 21 June 2019, Rifqi scored his first goal for Semen Padang in the 33rd minute against Badak Lampung.

=== PSMS Medan ===
He was signed for PSMS Medan to play in Liga 2 in the 2020 season. This season was suspended on 27 March 2020 due to the COVID-19 pandemic. The season was abandoned and was declared void on 20 January 2021.

=== Mitra Kukar ===
In 2021, Rifqi signed a contract with Indonesian Liga 2 club Mitra Kukar. He made his league debut on 11 October 2021 against Sulut United at the Tuah Pahoe Stadium, Palangka Raya.

=== Persikabo 1973 ===
He was signed for Persikabo 1973 to play in Liga 1 in the 2021 season. He made his league debut on 3 February 2022 in a match against Bali United at the Ngurah Rai Stadium, Denpasar.

=== Persita Tengerang ===
Rifqi was signed for Persita Tangerang to play in Liga 1 in the 2022–23 season. He made his league debut on 25 July 2022 in a match against Persik Kediri at the Indomilk Arena, Tangerang.

== Honours ==
Malut United

- Liga 2 third place (play-offs): 2023–24
