= Adi Nugroho =

Indonesian footballer

Personal information
- Full name: Adi Nugroho
- Date of birth: 3 September 1992 (age 34)
- Place of birth: Samarinda, East Kalimantan, Indonesia
- Height: 1.69 m (5 ft 7 in)
- Position: Winger

Youth career
- 2012–2014: Persisam U-21

Senior career*
Years	Team	Apps	(Gls)
2015–2017	Semen Padang	34	(0)
2018	PSS Sleman	8	(0)
2019–2020	Mitra Kukar	0	(0)

International career
2014	Indonesia U19	2	(0)
- * Club domestic league appearances and goals as of 22 June 2016

Adi Nugroho (born 3 September 1992) is an Indonesian professional footballer who plays as a winger.

== Club career ==
=== Mitra Kukar ===
Nugroho was signed by Mitra Kukar to play in Liga 2 in the 2019 season.

== International career ==
In 2014, Adi Nogroho represented the Indonesia U-19, in the 2014 AFF U-19 Youth Championship.
