= Friska Womsiwor =

Indonesian footballer

Personal information
- Full name: Friska Elisa Womsiwor
- Date of birth: 3 May 1995 (age 31)
- Place of birth: South Manokwari, Indonesia
- Height: 1.70 m (5 ft 7 in)
- Position: Winger

Team information
- Current team: Nusantara Lampung
- Number: 23

Senior career*
Years	Team	Apps	(Gls)
2012–2013	PSCS Cilacap	13	(7)
2014–2015	Persewon Wondama Bay	11	(1)
2016–2018	Persipura Jayapura	60	(8)
2019	Barito Putera	5	(0)
2019–2020	TIRA-Persikabo	11	(0)
2020–2021	Persela Lamongan	2	(0)
2021–2022	PSM Makassar	7	(0)
2021	→ Persijap Jepara (loan)	6	(0)
2022–2023	Persewar Waropen	6	(1)
2023–2024	Nusantara United	10	(0)
2024	Persikas Subang	11	(0)
2025–	Nusantara Lampung	5	(0)
- * Club domestic league appearances and goals as of 10 February 2025

Friska Elisa Womsiwor (born 3 May 1995) is an Indonesian professional footballer who plays as a winger for Liga Nusantara club Nusantara Lampung.

== Club career ==
=== Persipura Jayapura ===
He made his professional debut in Liga 1 on 18 April 2017 against Persegres Gresik United.

On 3 July 2017, against Mitra Kukar, Friska scored a hat trick and Persipura Jayapura beat Mitra Kukar 6–0. He then became the second player to score a hat trick in 2017 Liga 1. Previously, Madura United and Nigerian striker, Peter Odemwingie did the same thing when Madura United played against Semen Padang in the 11th week, when Madura United won 6–0 in Pamekasan.

=== Persikas Subang ===
On 12 August 2024, he was announced on the club's official Instagram account as a new recruit for Persikas Subang for the 2024–25 season.

== Honours ==
=== Club ===
Persipura Jayapura

- Indonesia Soccer Championship A: 2016
