= Gunansar Mandowen =

Indonesian footballer

Personal information
- Full name: Gunansar Papua Mandowen
- Date of birth: 14 November 2000 (age 25)
- Place of birth: Sarmi, Indonesia
- Height: 1.61 m (5 ft 3 in)
- Positions: Winger; attacking midfielder

Team information
- Current team: Persipura Jayapura
- Number: 33

Youth career
- 2016–2018: Persipura Jayapura

Senior career*
Years	Team	Apps	(Gls)
2018–2023	Persipura Jayapura	79	(11)
2023	PSM Makassar	2	(0)
2023–	Persipura Jayapura	38	(6)

International career^{‡}
2014–2015	Indonesia U16	6	(3)
2021	Indonesia U23	4	(0)
- * Club domestic league appearances and goals as of 22:00, 2 October 2026 ‡ National team caps and goals as of 29 October 2021

Gunansar Papua Mandowen (born 14 November 2000) is an Indonesian professional footballer who plays as a winger or attacking midfielder for Championship club Persipura Jayapura.

== Club career ==
=== Persipura Jayapura ===
In 2018, Gunansar joined Liga 1 club Persipura Jayapura. He made his debut on 24 March 2018 in a match against Persela Lamongan. On 7 April 2018, Gunansar scored his first goal for Persipura in the 28th minute against PS TIRA at the Mandala Stadium, Jayapura.

=== PSM Makassar ===
On 29 January 2023, Mandowen signed a contract with Liga 1 club PSM Makassar from Persipura Jayapura. Mandowen made his league debut for the club in a 0–1 win against Arema, coming on as a substituted Kenzo Nambu.

== International career ==
In October 2021, Mandowen was called up to the Indonesia U23 in a friendly match against Tajikistan and Nepal and also prepared for 2022 AFC U-23 Asian Cup qualification in Tajikistan by Shin Tae-yong. Mandowen made his debut for Indonesia U23, on 19 October 2021, by starting in a 2–1 win against Tajikistan U23.

== Career statistics ==
=== Club ===
As of 2 October 2026

Club	Season	League			Cup (Note: Includes Piala Indonesia.)		Continental		Other (Note: Appearances in Indonesia President's Cup.)		Total	
Club	Season	Division	Apps	Goals	Apps	Goals	Apps	Goals	Apps	Goals	Apps	Goals
Persipura Jayapura	2018	Liga 1	22	2	2	1	–		0	0	24	3
Persipura Jayapura	2019	Liga 1	28	3	0	0	–		3	0	31	3
Persipura Jayapura	2020	Liga 1	3	1	0	0	–		0	0	3	1
Persipura Jayapura	2021	Liga 1	20	2	0	0	–		0	0	20	2
Persipura Jayapura	2022	Liga 2	6	3	0	0	–		0	0	6	3
Persipura Jayapura	Total		79	11	2	1	–		3	0	84	12
PSM Makassar	2022–23	Liga 1	2	0	0	0	–		0	0	2	0
PSM Makassar	2023–24	Liga 1	0	0	0	0	0	0	0	0	0	0
PSM Makassar	Total		2	0	0	0	–		0	0	2	0
Persipura Jayapura	2023–24	Liga 2	5	0	0	0	–		0	0	5	0
Persipura Jayapura	2024–25	Liga 2	7	1	0	0	–		0	0	7	1
Persipura Jayapura	2025–26	Championship	22	5	0	0	–		0	0	22	5
Persipura Jayapura	2026–27	Championship	4	0	0	0	–		0	0	4	0
Career total			119	17	2	1	0	0	3	0	124	18

== Honours ==
=== Club ===
PSM Makassar

- Liga 1: 2022–23
