= Bayu Nugroho =

Indonesian footballer

Personal information
- Full name: Bayu Nugroho
- Date of birth: 11 May 1992 (age 34)
- Place of birth: Surakarta, Indonesia
- Height: 1.74 m (5 ft 9 in)
- Position: Winger

Team information
- Current team: Persibo Bojonegoro
- Number: 92

Youth career
- SSB Ksatria Solo
- 2010: Suryanaga Surabaya

Senior career*
Years	Team	Apps	(Gls)
2011–2012	Surabaya United	10	(0)
2013–2017	Persis Solo	49	(13)
2018–2019	PSIS Semarang	60	(7)
2020	Persebaya Surabaya	0	(0)
2021–2022	Dewa United	6	(1)
2022	PSPS Pekanbaru	6	(0)
2023–2024	Persibo Bojonegoro	7	(5)
2024–2025	Persikab Bandung	17	(7)
2025–	Persibo Bojonegoro	10	(5)
- * Club domestic league appearances and goals as of 11 January 2026

Bayu Nugroho (born 11 May 1992) is an Indonesian professional footballer who plays as a winger for Liga Nusantara club Persibo Bojonegoro.

== Honours ==
=== Club ===
Persebaya Surabaya

- East Java Governor Cup: 2020

Dewa United

- Liga 2 third place (play-offs): 2021
