= 2015 Bali United F.C. season =

Indonesian football club season

Bali United
2015 season
- Chairman: Pieter Tanuri
- Manager: Indra Sjafri
- Stadium: Kapten I Wayan Dipta Stadium
- Super League: Did not finish
- Piala Indonesia: Cancelled
- Top goalscorer: League: Lerby Eliandry (3); All: Lerby Eliandry (3)
Home colours	Away colours	Third colours

The 2015 season was the inaugural season of competitive association football played by Bali United Football Club, a professional football club based in Gianyar, Bali, Indonesia as a new club following the team's change of name from Putra Samarinda.

Following Putra Samarinda's result from the 2014 Indonesia Super League, Bali United played their first season in the Indonesia Super League.

They unable to finished the league and Piala Indonesia was cancelled because all competition this season was discontinued by PSSI on 2 May 2015 due to a ban by the sports minister on PSSI running any football competition.

== Pre-season and friendlies ==
=== Friendlies ===
Friendlies match details
Date	Opponent	Venue	Result	Scorers
28 January – 16:00	Pra-PON Bali	Neutral	2–0	Hendra (2)
31 January – 16:00	Putra Tresna	Neutral	4–0	Lerby (2), Martinus (2)
6 February – 16:00	Persebaya	Neutral	1–0	Lerby
3 March – 20:00	Persib	Home	0–1	
8 March – 16:00	PSIS	Away	0–0	
29 April – 20:00	(Timor-Leste) Timor Leste U23s	Home	1–0	Lerby
17 May – 16:00	Persib	Home	0–2	
27 May – 20:00	Pusamania Borneo	Away	0–1	
2 June – 20:00	Pusamania Borneo	Home	3–1	Lerby, Gatra, Hendra
14 June – 20:00	Arema Cronus	Away	1–0	Sukarja
8 November – 16:30	Surabaya United	Home	4–1	Wirahadi, Martinus, Alsan, Loudry
16 December – 15:30	Pespa	Home	1–0	Wirahadi
20 December – 20:00	PSS	Away	0–3	
23 December – 15:30	Putra Tresna	Home	3–1	Endra, Makmun, Fadil
26 December – 15:30	Pro Kundalini	Home	3–0	Hendra, Hamdi, Makmun

=== Bali Island Cup ===
Bali Island Cup match details
Date	Round	Opponent	Venue	Result	Scorers
12 March – 19:30	Match 1	Persiram	Home	0–0	
14 March – 19:30	Match 2	Arema Cronus	Home	2–2	Lerby, Sukarja
16 March – 19:30	Match 3	Pelita Bandung Raya	Home	0–0	

=== Sunrise of Java Cup ===
Sunrise of Java Cup match details
Date	Round	Opponent	Venue	Result	Scorers
30 July – 16:15	Match 1	Arema Cronus	Neutral	1–2	Lerby
1 August – 20:15	Match 2	Persewangi	Neutral	3–1	Samma (2), Sandi
2 August – 16:15	Match 3	Indonesia All Stars	Neutral	4–2	Sukarja (2), Lerby (2)

=== Indonesia President's Cup ===
Indonesia President's Cup match details
Date	Round	Opponent	Venue	Result	Scorers
30 August – 16:00	Group stage	Persija	Home	3–0	Sandi, Samma, Lerby
3 September – 19:00	Group stage	Mitra Kukar	Home	2–2	Fadil, Gatra
3 September – 19:00	Group stage	Persita	Home	2–1	Sukarja, Lerby
19 September – 19:00	Quarter-finals; First leg	Arema Cronus	Away	1–2	Lerby
27 September – 19:00	Quarter-finals; Second leg	Arema Cronus	Home	2–3	Gatra, Hendra

=== General Sudirman Cup ===
General Sudirman Cup match details
Date	Round	Opponent	Venue	Result	Scorers
14 November – 20:45	Group stage	Persipura	Home	1–1 (4–1 p)	Lerby
20 November – 20:30	Group stage	Mitra Kukar	Home	0–1	
26 November – 20:30	Group stage	Semen Padang	Home	0–2	
29 November – 16:00	Group stage	PSM	Home	0–0 (4–1 p)	

== Match results ==
=== Super League ===
Pos	Team	Pld	W	D	L	GF	GA	GD	Pts
14	Persiram	2	0	1	1	1	3	−2	1
15	Persipasi Bandung Raya	2	0	1	1	1	4	−3	1
16	Mitra Kukar	2	0	0	2	2	4	−2	0
17	Bali United	2	0	0	2	3	7	−4	0
18	Persiba	1	0	0	1	0	4	−4	0

Source: QNB League, Soccerway
Rules for classification: 1) Points; 2) Goal difference; 3) Goals scored.

Super League match details
Date	Week	Opponent	Venue	Result	Scorers	Attendance	Referee	Position
4 April – 14:15	1	Perseru	Away	1–2	Lerby	5,347	Bachrul Ulum	13
8 April – 14:30	2	Persipura	Away	2–5	Lerby (2)	21,136	Suharto	17
13 April – 16:30	3	Persiram	Away					
19 April – 20:00	4	Pusamania Borneo	Home					
23 April – 20:00	5	Mitra Kukar	Home					
9 May – 20:00	6	Semen Padang	Away					
13 May – 16:30	7	Persipasi Bandung Raya	Away					
3 June – 16:30	8	Persiba	Home					
7 June – 20:00	9	PSM	Home					
27 June – 22:00	10	Persib	Away					
1 July – 22:00	11	Sriwijaya	Away					
6 July – 22:00	12	Gresik United	Home					
10 July – 22:00	13	Persebaya	Away					
24 July – 20:00	14	Persela	Home					
28 July – 20:00	15	Arema Cronus	Home					
2 August – 20:00	16	Barito Putera	Away					
6 August – 20:00	17	Persija	Away					
19 August – 22:00	18	Persija	Home					
24 August – 16:30	19	Barito Putera	Home					
27 August – 16:30	20	Arema Cronus	Away					
30 August – 20:00	21	Persela	Away					
10 September – 16:30	22	Gresik United	Away					
14 September – 16:30	23	Persebaya	Home					
20 September – 20:00	24	Sriwijaya	Home					
23 September – 16:30	25	Persib	Home					
27 September – 16:30	26	PSM	Away					
30 September – 20:00	27	Persiba	Away					
16 October – 20:00	28	Persipasi Bandung Raya	Home					
20 October – 20:00	29	Semen Padang	Home					
23 October – 16:30	30	Mitra Kukar	Away					
27 October – 20:00	31	Pusamania Borneo	Away					
31 October – 16:30	32	Persiram	Home					
19 November – 16:30	33	Persipura	Home					
23 November – 16:30	34	Perseru	Home					

== Player details ==
=== Appearances and goals ===
No.	Pos	Nat	Player	Total		Super League		Piala Indonesia	
No.	Pos	Nat	Player	Apps	Goals	Apps	Goals	Apps	Goals
1	GK	(South Korea) KOR	Yoo Jae-hoon (captain)	2	0	2	0	0	0
2	DF	(Indonesia) IDN	Wahyu Kristanto	2	0	2	0	0	0
3	DF	(Indonesia) IDN	I Nengah Sulendra	1	0	0+1	0	0	0
4	DF	(Indonesia) IDN	Syaeful Anwar	1	0	0+1	0	0	0
5	DF	(Indonesia) IDN	Endra Permana	2	0	2	0	0	0
6	DF	(Indonesia) IDN	Junius R. Bate	0	0	0	0	0	0
7	MF	(Indonesia) IDN	Yabes Roni	0	0	0	0	0	0
8	DF	(Indonesia) IDN	Ricky Fajrin	2	0	2	0	0	0
9	FW	(Indonesia) IDN	Amadeus Suropati	0	0	0	0	0	0
10	MF	(Indonesia) IDN	Loudry Setiawan	2	0	1+1	0	0	0
12	FW	(Indonesia) IDN	Lerby Eliandry	2	3	2	3	0	0
13	DF	(Indonesia) IDN	Bobby Satria	2	0	2	0	0	0
14	MF	(Indonesia) IDN	Fadil Sausu	2	0	2	0	0	0
15	MF	(Indonesia) IDN	Sukron Makmun	0	0	0	0	0	0
16	DF	(Indonesia) IDN	Ganjar Mukti	0	0	0	0	0	0
17	MF	(Indonesia) IDN	I Nyoman Sukarja	0	0	0	0	0	0
19	MF	(Indonesia) IDN	Hendra Sandi	2	0	2	0	0	0
20	MF	(Indonesia) IDN	Sutanto Tan	0	0	0	0	0	0
21	MF	(Indonesia) IDN	Sandi Darma Sute	2	0	1+1	0	0	0
22	MF	(Indonesia) IDN	Sultan Samma	2	0	0+2	0	0	0
23	MF	(Indonesia) IDN	Bayu Gatra	2	0	2	0	0	0
26	GK	(Indonesia) IDN	Awan Setho Raharjo	0	0	0	0	0	0
29	DF	(Chile) CHI	Cristian Febre	0	0	0	0	0	0
30	GK	(Indonesia) IDN	Endra Prasetya	0	0	0	0	0	0
51	MF	(Indonesia) IDN	Iswandi Dai	0	0	0	0	0	0
88	DF	(Indonesia) IDN	Adi Parwa	0	0	0	0	0	0
95	FW	(Indonesia) IDN	Martinus Novianto	2	0	2	0	0	0

- Source: Match results
- Ordered by player's number.

=== Disciplinary record ===
No.	Pos	Nat	Player	Total			Super League			Piala Indonesia		
No.	Pos	Nat	Player	Yellow card	Second yellow card	Red card	Yellow card	Second yellow card	Red card	Yellow card	Second yellow card	Red card

- Source: Match results
- Ordered by player's number.
- (yellow card) = Number of bookings; (second yellow card) = Number of sending offs after a second yellow card; (red card) = Number of sending offs by a direct red card.

== Transfers ==
=== Inaugural players ===
These were inaugural players for Bali United that signed the contract before the start of 2015 Indonesia Super League.

Signed date	Pos.	Name	Previous club	Ref.
13 January 2015	GK	(South Korea) Yoo Jae-hoon	Persipura	
13 January 2015	GK	(Indonesia) Endra Prasetya	PSBI	
13 January 2015	DF	(South Korea) Ha Dae-won	Barito Putera	
13 January 2015	DF	(Indonesia) Endra Permana	Putra Samarinda	
13 January 2015	DF	(Indonesia) Wahyu Kristanto	Putra Samarinda	
13 January 2015	MF	(Indonesia) Bayu Gatra	Putra Samarinda	
13 January 2015	MF	(Indonesia) Fadil Sausu	Putra Samarinda	
13 January 2015	MF	(Indonesia) Loudry Setiawan	Putra Samarinda	
13 January 2015	MF	(Indonesia) Sandi Darma Sute	Putra Samarinda	
13 January 2015	MF	(Indonesia) Sultan Samma	Putra Samarinda	
13 January 2015	FW	(Indonesia) Lerby Eliandry	Putra Samarinda	
13 January 2015	GK	(Indonesia) Awan Setho Raharjo	Free agent	
13 January 2015	DF	(Indonesia) Ricky Fajrin	Free agent	
13 January 2015	DF	(Indonesia) Syaeful Anwar	Free agent	
13 January 2015	MF	(Indonesia) Hendra Sandi	Free agent	
13 January 2015	MF	(Indonesia) Yabes Roni	Free agent	
13 January 2015	FW	(Indonesia) Martinus Novianto	Free agent	
14 January 2015	MF	(Indonesia) I Nyoman Sukarja	PS Badung	
14 January 2015	DF	(Indonesia) Junius R. Bate	Perseden	
15 January 2015	DF	(Indonesia) I Nengah Sulendra	Perseden	
18 January 2015	MF	(Indonesia) Windu Wibowo	Persis	
18 January 2015	MF	(Indonesia) Sutanto Tan	Pelita Bandung Raya U21s	
18 January 2015	FW	(Indonesia) Amadeus Suropati	Pusamania Borneo	
19 January 2015	DF	(Indonesia) Ganjar Mukti	Persita	
19 January 2015	FW	(Indonesia) Sukron Makmun	Free agent	
19 February 2015	DF	(Indonesia) Bobby Satria	Persikabo	
20 February 2015	MF	(Indonesia) Iswandi Dai	PSBI	
18 March 2015	DF	(Indonesia) Adi Parwa	PS Badung	

=== Transfers in ===
These list include the players who signed the contract after 2015 Indonesia Super League start.

Date	Pos.	Name	From	Fee	Ref.
8 April 2015	DF	(Chile) Cristian Febre	Free agent	Free transfer	

=== Transfers out ===
These list include the players who left the club after they signed a contract.

Date	Pos.	Name	To	Fee	Ref.
26 March 2015	MF	(Indonesia) Windu Wibowo	Free agent	Released	
8 April 2015	DF	(South Korea) Ha Dae-won	Free agent	Released	
1 June 2015	GK	(South Korea) Yoo Jae-hoon	Free agent	Released	
1 June 2015	DF	(Chile) Cristian Febre	Free agent	Released	
1 June 2015	GK	(Indonesia) Endra Prasetya	Free agent	Released	
28 July 2015	FW	(Indonesia) Amadeus Suropati	Free agent	Released	
28 September 2015	GK	(Indonesia) Awan Setho Raharjo	Free agent	Released	
26 October 2015	MF	(Indonesia) Sultan Samma	Pusamania Borneo	Free transfer	
1 November 2015	MF	(Indonesia) Sandi Darma Sute	Free agent	Released	
