= 2019 Liga 3 Bali =

Tournament details
- Dates: 24 September – 7 October 2019
- Teams: 10

Final positions
- Champions: Perseden (1st title)
- Runners-up: Tunas Muda Ubud
- Third place: PSAD Kodam IX/Udayana
- Fourth place: Putra Tresna Bali
- Regional Round: Perseden

Tournament statistics
- Matches played: 24
- Goals scored: 91 (3.79 per match)

The 2019 Liga 3 Bali was the fifth edition of Liga 3 Bali as a qualifying round for the Lesser Sunda Islands (Bali Nusra) regional round of 2019 Liga 3. The competition began on 24 September 2019 and ended with a final on 7 October 2019.

Putra Tresna Bali were the defending champions, but they were eliminated by Perseden in the semi-finals on 5 October 2019 in a rematch of the previous year's final.

Perseden won their first Liga 3 Bali title with a 4–2 victory on penalties over Tunas Muda Ubud following a 1–1 draw after extra time on 7 October 2019. Perseden would represent Bali Region for the Lesser Sunda Islands regional round.

== Format ==
In this competition, the teams were divided into two groups of five. The two best teams were through to knockout stage. The winner represent Bali Region in Lesser Sunda Islands regional round of 2019 Liga 3.

== Teams ==
There were 10 teams participated in the league this season.

- Bali
- Perseden
- PS Badung
- PSAD Kodam IX/Udayana
- Putra Pegok
- Putra Tresna Bali
- Sportivo Buleleng
- Sulut Bali
- Tunas Muda Ubud
- Undiksha

== Group stage ==
This stage started on 24 September and finished 3 October 2019. All matches was held at Ngurah Rai Stadium and Kompyang Sujana Stadium, Denpasar.

=== Group A ===
| Pos | Team | Pld | W | D | L | GF | GA | GD | Pts | Qualification |
|---|---|---|---|---|---|---|---|---|---|---|
| 1 | Putra Tresna Bali | 4 | 3 | 1 | 0 | 10 | 1 | +9 | 10 | Advance to semifinals |
| 2 | Tunas Muda Ubud | 4 | 3 | 0 | 1 | 7 | 3 | +4 | 9 | Advance to semifinals |
| 3 | PS Badung | 4 | 2 | 1 | 1 | 6 | 3 | +3 | 7 | |
| 4 | Sportivo Buleleng | 4 | 0 | 1 | 3 | 0 | 10 | −10 | 1 | |
| 5 | Bali | 4 | 0 | 1 | 3 | 1 | 7 | −6 | 1 | |

Source: Matches

24 September 2019
| PS Badung | 3–0 | Sportivo Buleleng | Ngurah Rai Stadium, Denpasar |
| Putra Tresna Bali | 2–0 | Bali | Ngurah Rai Stadium, Denpasar |
26 September 2019
| Bali | 1–3 | Tunas Muda Ubud | Ngurah Rai Stadium, Denpasar |
| Putra Tresna Bali | 1–1 | PS Badung | Ngurah Rai Stadium, Denpasar |
28 September 2019
| PS Badung | 2–0 | Bali | Kompyang Sujana Stadium, Denpasar |
| Tunas Muda Ubud | 2–0 | Sportivo Buleleng | Kompyang Sujana Stadium, Denpasar |
30 September 2019
| Sportivo Buleleng | 0–5 | Putra Tresna Bali | Ngurah Rai Stadium, Denpasar |
| Tunas Muda Ubud | 2–0 | PS Badung | Ngurah Rai Stadium, Denpasar |
2 October 2019
| Putra Tresna Bali | 2–0 | Tunas Muda Ubud | Kompyang Sujana Stadium, Denpasar |
| Bali | 0–0 | Sportivo Buleleng | Kompyang Sujana Stadium, Denpasar |

=== Group B ===
| Pos | Team | Pld | W | D | L | GF | GA | GD | Pts | Qualification |
|---|---|---|---|---|---|---|---|---|---|---|
| 1 | PSAD Kodam IX/Udayana | 4 | 3 | 0 | 1 | 18 | 4 | +14 | 9 | Advance to semifinals |
| 2 | Perseden | 4 | 3 | 0 | 1 | 16 | 3 | +13 | 9 | Advance to semifinals |
| 3 | Undiksha | 4 | 3 | 0 | 1 | 9 | 5 | +4 | 9 | |
| 4 | Putra Pegok | 4 | 1 | 0 | 3 | 4 | 16 | −12 | 3 | |
| 5 | Sulut Bali | 4 | 0 | 0 | 4 | 1 | 20 | −19 | 0 | |

Source: Matches

25 September 2019
| Undiksha | 4–1 | Putra Pegok | Ngurah Rai Stadium, Denpasar |
| Perseden | 1–3 | PSAD Kodam IX/Udayana | Ngurah Rai Stadium, Denpasar |
27 September 2019
| Perseden | 4–0 | Sulut Bali | Ngurah Rai Stadium, Denpasar |
| PSAD Kodam IX/Udayana | 3–1 | Putra Pegok | Ngurah Rai Stadium, Denpasar |
29 September 2019
| Putra Pegok | 0–8 | Perseden | Kompyang Sujana Stadium, Denpasar |
| Sulut Bali | 0–3 | Undiksha | Kompyang Sujana Stadium, Denpasar |
1 October 2019
| Undiksha | 2–1 | PSAD Kodam IX/Udayana | Ngurah Rai Stadium, Denpasar |
| Sulut Bali | 1–2 | Putra Pegok | Ngurah Rai Stadium, Denpasar |
3 October 2019
| PSAD Kodam IX/Udayana | 11–0 | Sulut Bali | Ngurah Rai Stadium, Denpasar |
| Perseden | 3–0 | Undiksha | Kompyang Sujana Stadium, Denpasar |

== Knockout stage ==
=== Bracket ===
Semi-finals
5 October – Gianyar
Putra Tresna Bali | 1
Perseden | 5
5 October – Gianyar
PSAD Kodam IX/Udayana | 1
Tunas Muda Ubud | 4

Final
7 October – Gianyar
Perseden | 1 (4)
Tunas Muda Ubud | 1 (3)
Third place
7 October – Gianyar
Putra Tresna Bali | 2
PSAD Kodam IX/Udayana | 4

=== Semi-finals ===
5 October 2019
| Putra Tresna Bali | 1–5 | Perseden | Kapten I Wayan Dipta Stadium, Gianyar |
| PSAD Kodam IX/Udayana | 1–4 | Tunas Muda Ubud | Kapten I Wayan Dipta Stadium, Gianyar |

=== Third place ===
7 October 2019
| Putra Tresna Bali | 2–4 | PSAD Kodam IX/Udayana | Kapten I Wayan Dipta Stadium, Gianyar |

=== Final ===
7 October 2019
| Perseden | 1–1 (4–2 p) | Tunas Muda Ubud | Kapten I Wayan Dipta Stadium, Gianyar |
