= 2021 Liga 3 Bali =

Bali United Liga 3

Tournament details
- Dates: 14 October – 15 December 2021
- Teams: 16

Final positions
- Champions: Perseden (2nd title)
- Runners-up: PS Jembrana
- Third place: PS Tunas Muda Ubud
- Fourth place: East Bali
- National Round: Perseden; PS Jembrana

Tournament statistics
- Matches played: 40
- Goals scored: 146 (3.65 per match)
- Top goal scorer(s): I Made Agus Wijaya; Reza Yulian (7 goals each)

The 2021 Liga 3 Bali season (also known as the 2021 Bali United Liga 3 season for sponsorship reasons) was the sixth season of Liga 3 Bali as a qualifying round for the national round of the 2021–22 Liga 3. It began on 14 October and ended with a final on 15 December 2021. Perseden were the defending champion and they successfully defended their title following a 1–0 win against PS Jembrana in the final.

== Teams ==
There were 16 teams participated in the league this season.

Team	Location
Bali	Badung
Bali All Stars	Denpasar
East Bali	Karangasem
FSK	Klungkung
Perseden	Denpasar
Persekaba Bali	Badung
Perst	Tabanan
Pro Kundalini	Denpasar
PS Gianyar	Gianyar
PS Jembrana	Jembrana
PSAD Udayana	Denpasar
PS Tunas Muda Ubud	Gianyar
Putra Tresna Bali	Denpasar
Sahadewa Galapagos United	Gianyar
Sportivo Buleleng	Buleleng
Undiksha	Buleleng

== First round ==
In this round, competing teams were divided into four groups of four teams (groups A to D). Teams in each group played one another in a round-robin, with the top two teams advanced to the second round.

All times listed below are Central Indonesia Time (WITA).

=== Group A ===
Pos	Team	Pld	W	D	L	GF	GA	GD	Pts	Qualification
1	Perseden	3	3	0	0	10	3	+7	9	Advance to second round
2	PS Jembrana	3	1	1	1	5	5	0	4	Advance to second round
3	Persekaba Bali	3	1	0	2	3	4	−1	3	
4	FSK	3	0	1	2	5	11	−6	1	

Source: Bali United Liga 3
16 October 2021
15:30

Perseden	1–0	Persekaba Bali
I Nengah Sulendra 81'	Report

Pecangakan Stadium, Jembrana
17 October 2021
15:30

PS Jembrana	2–2	FSK
I Putu Ari Krisnawan 5'; Oni Rosandi 38'	Report	I Made Agus Dwipayana 43'; Kadek Satwika 48'

Pecangakan Stadium, Jembrana

23 October 2021
15:30

Persekaba Bali	0–2	PS Jembrana
	Report	I Putu Ari Gilang Setiawan 72', 78' (pen.)

Pecangakan Stadium, Jembrana
24 October 2021
15:30

FSK	2–6	Perseden
I Kadek Yude Irawan 60'; Aji Sapo Asegaf 77'	Report	Aprianto 8'; Fajar Ferdy Saputra 15'; Fahmy Rizal 17'; I Made Antha Wijaya 20'; Reza Yulian 32'; I Gede Suara Dharma 71'

Pecangakan Stadium, Jembrana

30 October 2021
15:30

Perseden	3–1	PS Jembrana
Reza Yulian 2'; I Gede Suara Dharma 39'; I Made Antha Wijaya 68 pen.'	Report	Elpin Pulu Kandahi 56'

Pecangakan Stadium, Jembrana
31 October 2021
15:30

FSK	1–3	Persekaba Bali
Aji Sapo Asegaf 6'	Report	I Gede Guruh Krismana 36', 43'; Made Yuda 67'

Pecangakan Stadium, Jembrana

=== Group B ===
Pos	Team	Pld	W	D	L	GF	GA	GD	Pts	Qualification
1	PS Tunas Muda Ubud	3	2	1	0	12	1	+11	7	Advance to second round
2	PS Gianyar	3	2	1	0	10	2	+8	7	Advance to second round
3	Pro Kundalini	3	0	1	2	3	8	−5	1	
4	Sportivo Buleleng	3	0	1	2	4	18	−14	1	

Source: Bali United Liga 3
14 October 2021
15:30

PS Tunas Muda Ubud	3–0	Pro Kundalini
Komang Dedi Hendrawan 8'; Agus Desiartama 33'; Ronaldo Cevan Atilla 46'	Report

Wenara Mandala Field, Gianyar
15 October 2021
15:30

PS Gianyar	7–1	Sportivo Buleleng
I Gede Agus Indra 8'; I Kadek Adi Sutrisna 20', 55'; I Made Agus Wijaya 26', 57', 75'; I Kadek Yoga Prasetya 69'	Report	Muhammad Faiq Muchlisin 68'

Wenara Mandala Field, Gianyar

21 October 2021
15:30

Pro Kundalini	0–2	PS Gianyar
	Report	I Kadek Yoga Prasetya 33'; I Made Agus Wijaya 87'

Wenara Mandala Field, Gianyar
22 October 2021
15:30

Sportivo Buleleng	0–8	PS Tunas Muda Ubud
	Report	I Made Valentino Rossi Saputra 11'; Ronaldo Cevan Atilla 35', 69'; Agus Desiartama 43' (pen.), 68'; I Nyoman Sugiartha 45'; Ega Prayogi 67'; I Made Geva Kastamana 78'

Wenara Mandala Field, Gianyar

28 October 2021
15:30

PS Tunas Muda Ubud	1–1	PS Gianyar
I Made Valentino Rossi Saputra 76'	Report	I Made Agus Wijaya 63'

Wenara Mandala Field, Gianyar
29 October 2021
15:30

Sportivo Buleleng	3–3	Pro Kundalini
Muhammad Eris Aidil 33'; Muhammad Faiq Muchlisin 60'; Wildan Nova Permana 88'	Report	Unknown 22' (o.g.); Ugroho Mas'ud 43'; Choirul Nugroho 90+2'

Wenara Mandala Field, Gianyar

=== Group C ===
Pos	Team	Pld	W	D	L	GF	GA	GD	Pts	Qualification
1	East Bali	3	2	1	0	10	1	+9	7	Advance to second round
2	Undiksha	3	2	0	1	8	2	+6	6	Advance to second round
3	PSAD Udayana	3	1	1	1	4	3	+1	4	
4	Bali	3	0	0	3	1	17	−16	0	

Source: Bali United Liga 3
14 October 2021
15:30

PSAD Udayana	3–0 (w/o)	Bali
	Report

Debes Stadium, Tabanan
15 October 2021
15:30

East Bali	1–0	Undiksha
Muhammad Alfarizi 90'	Report

Debes Stadium, Tabanan

21 October 2021
15:30

Bali	0–8	East Bali
	Report	Muhammad Alfarizi 2', 38', 69'; Bagus Pribadi 8'; Muhammad Yuda Ardiyanto 30', 37'; Kadek Suwastika 50', 62'

Debes Stadium, Tabanan
22 October 2021
15:30

Undiksha	2–0	PSAD Udayana
Muhammad Alan Saputra 39'; I Kadek Sentana Adi Putra 76'	Report

Debes Stadium, Tabanan

28 October 2021
15:30

PSAD Udayana	1–1	East Bali
Januardi 63'	Report	Kadek Suwastika 17'

Debes Stadium, Tabanan
29 October 2021
15:30

Undiksha	6–1	Bali
I Kadek Sentana Adi Putra 6' (pen.), 31' (pen.); Hidayatullah 33'; Ahmad Alfarizi 34'; Gung Mas Galih Angkasa 54'; Fajar Ismail 68'	Report	Dadang Dwi Cahyono 77' (pen.)

Debes Stadium, Tabanan

=== Group D ===
Pos	Team	Pld	W	D	L	GF	GA	GD	Pts	Qualification
1	Sahadewa Galapagos United	3	2	1	0	10	4	+6	7	Advance to second round
2	Perst	3	2	0	1	5	4	+1	6	Advance to second round
3	Putra Tresna Bali	3	1	1	1	10	3	+7	4	
4	Bali All Stars	3	0	0	3	2	16	−14	0	

Source: Bali United Liga 3
16 October 2021
15:30

Putra Tresna Bali	1–1	Sahadewa Galapagos United
I Gede Surya Apriana 5'	Report	Muhammad Idris 52'

Debes Stadium, Tabanan
17 October 2021
15:30

Perst	2–0	Bali All Stars
I Gusti Nyoman Krisma Prianantara 17'; I Gusti Agung Adi Arimbawa 66'	Report

Debes Stadium, Tabanan

23 October 2021
15:30

Sahadewa Galapagos United	4–2	Perst
Bagas Faqih Alfiansyah 17', 30', 35'; Kristiyono 81'	Report	Agung Teguh Seri Rejeki 21'; I Gusti Nyoman Krisma Prianantara 75'

Debes Stadium, Tabanan
24 October 2021
15:30

Bali All Stars	1–9	Putra Tresna Bali
Makmun Nawawi 62' (pen.)	Report	I Gusti Ngurah Aditya 20' (pen.); I Gede Surya Apriana 22', 45+2', 65'; I Gede Gery Mardiastra 30', 49'; Ida Bagus Putu Purwa 84', 87', 90'

Debes Stadium, Tabanan

30 October 2021
15:30

Putra Tresna Bali	0–1	Perst
	Report	I Made Riki Agusdina 53'

Debes Stadium, Tabanan
31 October 2021
15:30

Bali All Stars	1–5	Sahadewa Galapagos United
Gede Beno Prawira 88'	Report	Angga Pebri Pradana 8'; Johan Mahardika 39'; Dwi Sudarmanto 42'; Bagas Faqih Alfiansyah 53'; Arjun Ariyanto 74'

Debes Stadium, Tabanan

== Second round ==
In this round, competing teams were divided into two groups of four teams (groups X to Y). Teams in each group played one another in a round-robin, with the top two teams advanced to the knockout stage.

All times listed below are Central Indonesia Time (WITA).

=== Group X ===
Pos	Team	Pld	W	D	L	GF	GA	GD	Pts	Qualification
1	Perseden	3	2	1	0	10	2	+8	7	Advance to knockout stage
2	East Bali	3	2	0	1	4	5	−1	6	Advance to knockout stage
3	PS Gianyar	3	1	1	1	5	4	+1	4	
4	Perst	3	0	0	3	0	8	−8	0	

Source: Bali United Liga 3
25 November 2021
15:00

Perseden	4–0	Perst
Fahmy Rizal 24'; Reza Yulian 58'; I Gede Suara Dharma 76'; I Made Antha Wijaya 88' (pen.)	Report

Debes Stadium, Tabanan
26 November 2021
15:00

PS Gianyar	1–2	East Bali
I Made Agus Wijaya 28' (pen.)	Report	Aditia Yoga Pratama 20' (pen.); Muhammad Yuda Ardiyanto 75'

Debes Stadium, Tabanan

4 December 2021
15:00

Perst	0–2	PS Gianyar
	Report	Lanang Agus 27'; Dinata Krisna 85'

Debes Stadium, Tabanan
5 December 2021
15:00

East Bali	0–4	Perseden
	Report	I Made Antha Wijaya 11'; Fajar Ferdy Saputra 37', 63'; I Gede Suara Dharma 75'

Debes Stadium, Tabanan

9 December 2021
15:00

Perseden	2–2	PS Gianyar
I Nengah Sulendra 31'; Reza Yulian 42'	Report	I Made Agus Wijaya 13'; Gede Suteja 66'

Debes Stadium, Tabanan
10 December 2021
15:00

East Bali	2–0	Perst
Muhammad Alfarizi 38'; Gede Kurniawan 52'	Report

Debes Stadium, Tabanan

=== Group Y ===
Pos	Team	Pld	W	D	L	GF	GA	GD	Pts	Qualification
1	PS Jembrana	3	2	1	0	7	2	+5	7	Advance to knockout stage
2	PS Tunas Muda Ubud	3	1	2	0	3	1	+2	5	Advance to knockout stage
3	Undiksha	3	1	1	1	4	4	0	4	
4	Sahadewa Galapagos United	3	0	0	3	2	9	−7	0	

Source: Bali United Liga 3
27 November 2021
15:00

PS Tunas Muda Ubud	0–0	Undiksha
	Report

Debes Stadium, Tabanan
28 November 2021
15:00

PS Jembrana	3–1	Sahadewa Galapagos United
I Kadek Sastra Sasmita 25', 69'; Elpin Pulu Kandahi 78'	Report	Aprian Prasetya 10'

Debes Stadium, Tabanan

2 December 2021
15:00

Undiksha	0–3	PS Jembrana
	Report	Yusron 20'; Oni Rosandi 54'; I Kadek Sastra Sasmita 82'

Debes Stadium, Tabanan
3 December 2021
15:00

Sahadewa Galapagos United	0–2	PS Tunas Muda Ubud
	Report	I Nyoman Sugiartha 17'; Agus Desiartama 87'

Debes Stadium, Tabanan

11 December 2021
15:00

PS Tunas Muda Ubud	1–1	PS Jembrana
I Wayan Ari Samba 54'	Report	Elpin Pulu Kandahi 83'

Debes Stadium, Tabanan
12 December 2021
15:00

Sahadewa Galapagos United	1–4	Undiksha
Kristiyono 36'	Report	I Kadek Sentana Adi Putra 39'; I Ketut Suarsana 43', 47'; Ahmad Alfarizi 49'

Debes Stadium, Tabanan

== Knockout stage ==
=== Bracket ===
Semi-finals
14 December – Gianyar
Perseden	3
PS Tunas Muda Ubud	1
14 December – Gianyar
PS Jembrana (a.e.t.)	1
East Bali	0

Final
15 December – Gianyar
Perseden	1
PS Jembrana	0
Third place
15 December – Gianyar
PS Tunas Muda Ubud	5
East Bali	1

=== Semi-finals ===
14 December 2021
15:00

Perseden	3–1	PS Tunas Muda Ubud
Fajar Ferdy Saputra 28'; Reza Yulian 41', 64'	Report	Agus Fredy Widaya 50' (pen.)

Kapten I Wayan Dipta Stadium, Gianyar

14 December 2021
19:00

PS Jembrana	1–0 (a.e.t.)	East Bali
I Putu Ari Gilang Setiawan 120+2' (pen.)	Report

Kapten I Wayan Dipta Stadium, Gianyar

=== Third place play-off ===
15 December 2021
15:00

PS Tunas Muda Ubud	5–1	East Bali
Ega Prayogi 50', 73'; Agus Desiartama 77'; Rival Adi Prastama 86'; I Made Valentino Rossi Saputra 90'	Report	Muhammad Alfarizi 83'

Kapten I Wayan Dipta Stadium, Gianyar

=== Final ===
15 December 2021
19:00

Perseden	1–0	PS Jembrana
Reza Yulian 48'	Report

Kapten I Wayan Dipta Stadium, Gianyar

== Top goalscorers ==
There were 146 goals scored in 40 matches, for an average of 3.65 goals per match.

7 goals

- Reza Yulian (Perseden)
- I Made Agus Wijaya (PS Gianyar)

6 goals

- Muhammad Alfarizi (East Bali)

5 goals

- Agus Desiartama (PS Tunas Muda Ubud)

4 goals

- Fajar Ferdy Saputra (Perseden)
- I Gede Suara Dharma (Perseden)
- I Made Antha Wijaya (Perseden)
- I Gede Surya Apriana (Putra Tresna Bali)
- Bagas Faqih Alfiansyah (Sahadewa Galapagos United)
- I Kadek Sentana Adi Putra (Undiksha)

3 goals

- Kadek Suwastika (East Bali)
- Muhammad Yuda Ardiyanto (East Bali)
- Elpin Pulu Kandahi (PS Jembrana)
- I Kadek Sastra Sasmita (PS Jembrana)
- I Putu Ari Gilang Setiawan (PS Jembrana)
- Ega Prayogi (PS Tunas Muda Ubud)
- I Made Valentino Rossi Saputra (PS Tunas Muda Ubud)
- Ronaldo Cevan Atilla (PS Tunas Muda Ubud)
- Ida Bagus Putu Purwa (Putra Tresna Bali)

2 goals

- Aji Sapo Asegaf (FSK)
- Fahmy Rizal (Perseden)
- I Nengah Sulendra (Perseden)
- I Gede Guruh Krismana (Persekaba Bali)
- I Gusti Nyoman Krisma Prianantara (Perst)
- I Kadek Adi Sutrisna (PS Gianyar)
- I Kadek Yoga Prasetya (PS Gianyar)
- Oni Rosandi (PS Jembrana)
- I Nyoman Sugiartha (PS Tunas Muda Ubud)
- I Gede Gery Mardiastra (Putra Tresna Bali)
- Kristiyono (Sahadewa Galapagos United)
- Muhammad Faiq Muchlisin (Sportivo Buleleng)
- Ahmad Alfarizi (Undiksha)
- I Ketut Suarsana (Undiksha)

1 goal

- Dadang Dwi Cahyono (Bali)
- Gede Beno Prawira (Bali All Stars)
- Makmun Nawawi (Bali All Stars)
- Aditia Yoga Pratama (East Bali)
- Bagus Pribadi (East Bali)
- Gede Kurniawan (East Bali)
- I Kadek Yude Irawan (FSK)
- I Made Agus Dwipayana (FSK)
- Kadek Satwika (FSK)
- Aprianto (Perseden)
- Made Yuda (Persekaba Bali)
- Agung Teguh Seri Rejeki (Perst)
- I Gusti Agung Adi Arimbawa (Perst)
- I Made Riki Agusdina (Perst)
- Choirul Nugroho (Pro Kundalini)
- Ugroho Mas'ud (Pro Kundalini)
- Dinata Krisna (PS Gianyar)
- Gede Suteja (PS Gianyar)
- I Gede Agus Indra (PS Gianyar)
- Lanang Agus (PS Gianyar)
- I Putu Ari Krisnawan (PS Jembrana)
- Yusron (PS Jembrana)
- Ari Samba (PS Tunas Muda Ubud)
- Agus Fredy Widaya (PS Tunas Muda Ubud)
- I Made Geva Kastamana (PS Tunas Muda Ubud)
- Komang Dedi Hendrawan (PS Tunas Muda Ubud)
- Rival Adi Prastama (PS Tunas Muda Ubud)
- Januardi (PSAD Udayana)
- I Gusti Ngurah Aditya (Putra Tresna Bali)
- Angga Pebri Pradana (Sahadewa Galapagos United)
- Aprian Prasetya (Sahadewa Galapagos United)
- Arjun Ariyanto (Sahadewa Galapagos United)
- Dwi Sudarmanto (Sahadewa Galapagos United)
- Johan Mahardika (Sahadewa Galapagos United)
- Muhammad Idris (Sahadewa Galapagos United)
- Muhammad Eris Aidil (Sportivo Buleleng)
- Wildan Nova Permana (Sportivo Buleleng)
- Fajar Ismail (Undiksha)
- Gung Mas Galih Angkasa (Undiksha)
- Hidayatullah (Undiksha)
- Muhammad Alan Saputra (Undiksha)

1 own goal

- Unknown (Pro Kundalini)
