= 2023 Liga 3 Bali =

Tournament details
- Dates: 15 November 2023 – 3 December 2023
- Teams: 8

Final positions
- Champions: Perseden (4th title)
- Runners-up: Putra Angkasa Kapal
- Third place: Putra Tresna Bali
- Fourth place: PS Badung
- National Phase: Perseden (Note: Based on last year performance.); Singaraja ZFP; Putra Angkasa Kapal

Tournament statistics
- Matches played: 16
- Goals scored: 50 (3.13 per match)

The 2023 Liga 3 Bali season was the sixth season of Liga 3 Bali as a qualifying round for the national phase of the 2023–24 Liga 3. It began on 15 November and ended with a final on 3 December 2023. Perseden were the three-time defending champion and they successfully defended their title following a 1–0 win against Putra Angkasa Kapal in the final.

== Teams ==
The draw for the league was held on 29 October 2023 with initially 10 teams involved. However, the initial draw result was scratched because Persibu and PSAD Udayana withdrew from the league, so the draw result had to be reconfirmed on 11 November 2023.

No	Team	Location
1	PS Badung	Badung
2	Putra Angkasa Kapal	Badung
3	Persibu^{WD}	Buleleng
4	Undiksha	Buleleng
5	Perseden	Denpasar
6	PSAD Udayana^{WD}	Denpasar
7	Putra Pegok	Denpasar
8	Putra Tresna Bali	Denpasar
9	Titan Alpha Bali	Denpasar
10	Indonesia Muda Bali	Tabanan

=== Name changes ===
On 29 October 2023, during the 2023 PSSI Bali Province Association Ordinary Congress, one team had their name change requests accepted by the federation:

- AFA Bali Lion changed its name to Titan Alpha Bali.

== Venue ==
- Kompyang Sujana Stadium, Denpasar

== Group stage ==
All times listed below are Central Indonesia Time (WITA).

=== Group A ===
Pos	Team	Pld	W	D	L	GF	GA	GD	Pts	Qualification
1	Perseden	3	2	1	0	7	0	+7	7	Advance to knockout stage
2	Putra Tresna Bali	3	1	1	1	4	6	−2	4	Advance to knockout stage
3	Undiksha	3	0	3	0	2	2	0	3	
4	Indonesia Muda Bali	3	0	1	2	3	8	−5	1	

Source: Liga 3 2023 Bali
15 November 2023
14:00

Indonesia Muda Bali	0–4	Perseden
	Report

Kompyang Sujana Stadium, Denpasar
15 November 2023
16:00

Putra Tresna Bali	1–1	Undiksha
	Report

Kompyang Sujana Stadium, Denpasar

19 November 2023
14:00

Perseden	3–0	Putra Tresna Bali
	Report

Kompyang Sujana Stadium, Denpasar
19 November 2023
16:15

Undiksha	1–1	Indonesia Muda Bali
	Report

Kompyang Sujana Stadium, Denpasar

23 November 2023
14:00

Indonesia Muda Bali	2–3	Putra Tresna Bali
	Report

Kompyang Sujana Stadium, Denpasar
23 November 2023
16:15

Undiksha	0–0	Perseden
	Report

Kompyang Sujana Stadium, Denpasar

=== Group B ===
Pos	Team	Pld	W	D	L	GF	GA	GD	Pts	Qualification
1	Putra Angkasa Kapal	3	2	1	0	8	0	+8	7	Advance to knockout stage
2	PS Badung	3	2	0	1	6	3	+3	6	Advance to knockout stage
3	Titan Alpha Bali	3	1	1	1	4	2	+2	4	
4	Putra Pegok	3	0	0	3	1	14	−13	0	

Source: Liga 3 2023 Bali
17 November 2023
14:00

PS Badung	0–1	Putra Angkasa Kapal
	Report

Kompyang Sujana Stadium, Denpasar
17 November 2023
16:00

Titan Alpha Bali	3–0	Putra Pegok
	Report

Kompyang Sujana Stadium, Denpasar

21 November 2023
14:00

Putra Angkasa Kapal	0–0	Titan Alpha Bali
	Report

Kompyang Sujana Stadium, Denpasar
21 November 2023
16:15

Putra Pegok	1–4	PS Badung
	Report

Kompyang Sujana Stadium, Denpasar

25 November 2023
14:00

PS Badung	2–1	Titan Alpha Bali
	Report

Kompyang Sujana Stadium, Denpasar
25 November 2023
16:15

Putra Pegok	0–7	Putra Angkasa Kapal
	Report

Kompyang Sujana Stadium, Denpasar

== Knockout stage ==
All times listed below are Central Indonesia Time (WITA).

=== Bracket ===
Semi-finals
29 November – Denpasar
Perseden	6
PS Badung	0
30 November – Denpasar
Putra Angkasa Kapal	3
Putra Tresna Bali	0

Final
2 December – Denpasar
Perseden	1
Putra Angkasa Kapal	0
Third place play-off
3 December – Denpasar
PS Badung	2
Putra Tresna Bali	3

=== Semi-finals ===
29 November 2023
15:00

Perseden	6–0	PS Badung
	Report

Kompyang Sujana Stadium, Denpasar

30 November 2023
15:00

Putra Angkasa Kapal	3–0	Putra Tresna Bali
	Report

Kompyang Sujana Stadium, Denpasar

=== Third place play-off ===
2 December 2023
15:00

PS Badung	2–3	Putra Tresna Bali
	Report

Kompyang Sujana Stadium, Denpasar

=== Final ===
3 December 2023
15:00

Perseden	1–0	Putra Angkasa Kapal
	Report

Kompyang Sujana Stadium, Denpasar
