= 2017 Liga 3 Bali =

Tournament details
- Dates: 9 July – 6 August 2017
- Teams: 10

Final positions
- Champions: Persekaba Bali (1st title)
- Runners-up: Perseden
- Third place: PS Gianyar
- Fourth place: Putra Pegok
- National Round: Persekaba Bali

Tournament statistics
- Matches played: 24
- Goals scored: 67 (2.79 per match)
- Top goal scorer(s): Agus Dwipayana; Antha Wijaya; Adi Sutrisna (6 goals each)

The 2017 Liga 3 Bali was the second edition of Liga 3 (formerly known as Liga Nusantara) Bali as a qualifying round for the national round of 2017 Liga 3. Pro Kundalini, winner of the 2014 Liga Nusantara Bali were the defending champions, as the 2015 Liga Nusantara Bali was not held and the 2016 ISC Liga Nusantara Bali was not counted as an official competition. The competition began on 9 July 2017 and concluded on 6 August 2017.

Persekaba Bali won their first Liga 3 Bali title following a penalty 4–3 won over Perseden Denpasar after 1–1 draw until extra time on 6 August 2017. Persekaba Bali would represent Bali Region in national round of 2017 Liga 3.

== Format ==
In this competition, the teams were divided into two groups of five. The two best teams were through to knockout stage. The winner would represent Bali Region in national round of 2017 Liga 3.

== Teams ==
There are 10 clubs participated this season.

#	Clubs	City/Regency	Head Coach
1	Bintang Persi Putra	Badung	(Indonesia) Wayan Suana
2	Perseden Denpasar	Denpasar	(Indonesia) Nyoman Ambara
3	Persekaba Bali	Badung	(Indonesia) Oka Triana
4	Pro Kundalini F.C.	Denpasar	(Indonesia) Arif
5	PS Gianyar	Gianyar	(Indonesia) Kadek Swartama
6	Putra Pegok	Denpasar	(Indonesia) Agus Budiartha
7	Putra Pemenang	Badung	(Indonesia) Nando
8	Singaraja F.C.	Buleleng	(Indonesia) Bambang Soebandrio
9	Tunas Muda	Gianyar	(Indonesia) Ida Bagus Mahayasa
10	Undiksha F.C.	Buleleng	(Indonesia) Chandra Andinata

== Group stage ==
This stage scheduled started on 9 July 2017 and finished 27 July 2017.

=== Group A ===
- All matches played in Yoga Perkanthi Stadium, Jimbaran
- Times listed were local (UTC+8:00)

Pos	Team	Pld	W	D	L	GF	GA	GD	Pts	Qualification
1	Persekaba Bali	4	3	1	0	9	2	+7	10	Advance to semifinals
2	PS Gianyar	4	2	2	0	6	4	+2	8	Advance to semifinals
3	Pro Kundalini	4	1	2	1	5	5	0	5	
4	Tunas Muda	4	1	0	3	4	8	−4	3	
5	Undiksha	4	0	1	3	1	6	−5	1	

Source: Bali Ekbis
9 July 2017
16:00

Persekaba Bali	0–0	PS Gianyar
	Report

Yoga Perkanthi Stadium, Jimbaran
11 July 2017
16:00

Tunas Muda	2–1	Undiksha
Ida Bagus Agung 60', 82'	Report	Joni Arta 90'

Yoga Perkanthi Stadium, Jimbaran

13 July 2017
16:00

Pro Kundalini	2–3	Persekaba Bali
Dicky Rumadat 31'; Dimas 61'	Report	Made Dwi Arya Dana 12', 27' (pen.); Gede Jeno Wilyantara 71'

Yoga Perkanthi Stadium, Jimbaran
15 July 2017
16:00

PS Gianyar	1–0	Undiksha
Kadek Adi Sutrisna 72'	Report

Yoga Perkanthi Stadium, Jimbaran

16 July 2017
16:00

Tunas Muda	0–1	Pro Kundalini
	Report	Dimas 53'

Yoga Perkanthi Stadium, Jimbaran
18 July 2017
16:00

Undiksha	0–3	Persekaba Bali
	Report	Yusuf Geovani 40'; Made Dwi Arya Dana; Alit Juniawan 81'

Yoga Perkanthi Stadium, Jimbaran

20 July 2017
16:00

PS Gianyar	3–2	Tunas Muda
Kadek Adi Sutrisna 67', 69'; Kholis 78'	Report	A.A. Arta 11'; Agus Desi 90+2'

Yoga Perkanthi Stadium, Jimbaran
23 July 2017
16:00

Undiksha	0–0	Pro Kundalini
	Report

Yoga Perkanthi Stadium, Jimbaran

25 July 2017
16:00

Persekaba Bali	3–0	Tunas Muda
Alit Juniawan 14', Dika Arimbawa 86'	Report

Yoga Perkanthi Stadium, Jimbaran
27 July 2017
16:00

Pro Kundalini	2–2	PS Gianyar
Doni 39'; Riki 78'	Report	Gustopa 27'; Dewa Aryananda 65'

Yoga Perkanthi Stadium, Jimbaran

=== Group B ===
- All matches played in Kompyang Sujana Stadium, Denpasar
- Times listed were local (UTC+8:00)

Pos	Team	Pld	W	D	L	GF	GA	GD	Pts	Qualification
1	Perseden	4	4	0	0	20	1	+19	12	Advance to semifinals
2	Putra Pegok	4	2	0	2	4	11	−7	6	Advance to semifinals
3	Putra Pemenang	4	1	2	1	3	7	−4	5	
4	Singaraja	4	1	1	2	5	7	−2	4	
5	Bintang Persi Putra	4	0	1	3	2	8	−6	1	

Source: Bali Ekbis
9 July 2017
16:00

Perseden	5–0	Putra Pemenang
Made Agus Dwipayana 11'; Made Antha Wijaya 25'; A. A. Surya Negara 32', 60'; Komang Suartawan 90'	Report

Kompyang Sujana Stadium, Denpasar
11 July 2017
16:00

Bintang Persi Putra	1–2	Putra Pegok
Ketut Sudi Artawan 90'	Report	Eka Pradana 17'; Sedana Yoga 35'

Kompyang Sujana Stadium, Denpasar

13 July 2017
16:00

Singaraja	1–4	Perseden
Bagus Pribadi 54'	Report	Made Agus Dwipayana 17', 70'; Andry Yudha 19'; Made Antha Wijaya 81'

Kompyang Sujana Stadium, Denpasar
15 July 2017
16:00

Putra Pemenang	1–0	Putra Pegok
Riky 32'	Report

Kompyang Sujana Stadium, Denpasar

16 July 2017
16:00

Bintang Persi Putra	0–2	Singaraja
	Report	Bagus Pribadi 55'; Gede Deva Surya W. 67'

Kompyang Sujana Stadium, Denpasar
18 July 2017
16:00

Putra Pegok	0–8	Perseden
	Report	Made Antha Wijaya,, Andry Yudha, Avioler Makatindu; Komang Suartawan; Made Agus Dwipayana

Kompyang Sujana Stadium, Denpasar

20 July 2017
16:00

Putra Pemenang	1–1	Bintang Persi Putra
Riky 89'	Report	Fery 81'

Kompyang Sujana Stadium, Denpasar
23 July 2017
16:00

Putra Pegok	2–1	Singaraja
Eka Pradana 15', 61'	Report	Gede Deva Surya W. 22'

Kompyang Sujana Stadium, Denpasar

25 July 2017
16:00

Perseden	3–0	Bintang Persi Putra
A.A. Surya Negara 60'; Avioler Makatindu 77'; Andry Yudha 82'	Report

Kompyang Sujana Stadium, Denpasar
27 July 2017
16:00

Singaraja	1–1	Putra Pemenang
Aris Fahmi 40'	Report	Rai 33'

Kompyang Sujana Stadium, Denpasar

== Knockout stage ==
Semifinals
30 July – Denpasar
Perseden	3
PS Gianyar	1
31 July – Jimbaran
Persekaba Bali	4
Putra Pegok	0

Final
6 August – Gianyar
Perseden	1 (2)
Persekaba Bali	1 (3)
Third Place
6 August – Gianyar
PS Gianyar	2
Putra Pegok	1

=== Semifinals ===
30 July 2017
16:00 UTC+8

Perseden	3–1	PS Gianyar
Andry Yudha 3'; Made Agus Dwipayana 37' (pen.), 84'	Report	Kadek Adi Sutrisna 6'

Kompyang Sujana Stadium, Denpasar
31 July 2017
16:00 UTC+8

Persekaba Bali	4–0	Putra Pegok
Dwi Diyan 6'; Made Dwi Arya Dana 15', 38'; Yudi Antara 84'	Report

Yoga Perkanthi Stadium, Jimbaran

=== Third place ===
6 August 2017
14:00 UTC+8

PS Gianyar	2–1	Putra Pegok
Kadek Adi Sutrisna 14', 87'	Report	Ade Ananda Wiranata

Kapten I Wayan Dipta Stadium, Gianyar

=== Final ===
6 August 2017
16:00 UTC+8

Perseden	1–1 (a.e.t.)	Persekaba Bali
Made Antha Wijaya 26'	Report	Alit Juniawan 47'
Penalties
Made Antha Wijaya (penalty scored); Ari Gilang (penalty scored); Komang Suartawan (penalty missed); Made Risma (penalty missed); A.A. Surya Negara (penalty missed)	2–3	Alit Juniawan (penalty scored); Yudi Antara (penalty scored); Made Dwi Arya Dana (penalty missed); Dwi Dyan Devayana (penalty missed); Pandu Prasaja (penalty scored)

Kapten I Wayan Dipta Stadium, Gianyar

== Statistics ==
=== Top scorers ===
Rank	Player	Club	Goals
1	(Indonesia) Agus Dwipayana	Perseden	6
1	(Indonesia) Antha Wijaya	Perseden	6
1	(Indonesia) Adi Sutrisna	PS Gianyar	6
4	(Indonesia) Andry Yudha	Perseden	5
4	(Indonesia) Dwi Arya Dana	Persekaba Bali	5
6	(Indonesia) Alit Juniawan	Persekaba Bali	4
7	(Indonesia) Surya Negara	Perseden	3
7	(Indonesia) Eka Pradana	Putra Pegok	3

Source:Group stage, Knockout stage
