= 2022 Liga 3 Bali =

Tournament details
- Dates: 14 August – 18 September 2022
- Teams: 15

Final positions
- Champions: Perseden (3rd title)
- Runners-up: Singaraja ZFP
- Third place: PSAD Udayana
- Fourth place: PS Badung
- National Round: Perseden

Tournament statistics
- Matches played: 40
- Goals scored: 114 (2.85 per match)

The 2022 Liga 3 Bali season was the fifth season of Liga 3 Bali as a qualifying round for the national round of the 2022–23 Liga 3. It began on 14 August and ended with a final on 18 September 2022. Perseden were the two-time defending champion and they successfully defended their title following a 6–5 win on penalties against Singaraja ZFP in the final.

== Teams ==
There are 15 teams participated in the league this season.

Team	Location
AFA Bali Lion	Tabanan
Bharata Bali	Buleleng
Bintang Bali	Badung
Perseden	Denpasar
Perst	Tabanan
Pro Kundalini	Denpasar
PS Badung	Badung
PS Jembrana	Jembrana
PS Tunas Muda Ubud	Gianyar
PSAD Udayana	Denpasar
Putra Angkasa Kapal	Badung
Putra Tresna Bali	Denpasar
Semarapura United	Klungkung
Singaraja ZFP	Buleleng
Sulut Bali	Denpasar

=== Name changes ===
On 5 June 2022, during the 2022 PSSI Bali Province Association Ordinary Congress, two teams had their name change requests accepted by the federation:

- PS Klungkung changed its name to Semarapura United.
- Bintang Persi changed its name to Bintang Bali.

== First round ==
In this round, teams were divided into three groups of five teams (groups A to C). Teams in each group played one another in a round-robin, with the top two teams advanced to the second round.

All times listed below are Central Indonesia Time (WITA).

=== Group A ===
All matches were held at the Yoga Perkanthi Stadium, Badung Regency.

Pos	Team	Pld	W	D	L	GF	GA	GD	Pts	Qualification	ZFP	PDN	PTS	BIN	SUB
1	Singaraja ZFP	4	3	0	1	4	2	+2	9 (Note: Head-to-head result: Singaraja ZFP 1–0 Perseden.)	Advance to second round	—	1–0	0–2	—	—
2	Perseden	4	3	0	1	8	3	+5	9	Advance to second round	—	—	—	3–1	2–1
3	Putra Tresna Bali	4	2	1	1	5	4	+1	7		—	0–3	—	0–0	—
4	Bintang Bali (H)	4	0	2	2	1	4	−3	2		0–1	—	—	—	0–0
5	Sulut Bali	4	0	1	3	2	7	−5	1		0–2	—	1–3	—	—

Source: Liga 3 Bali
(H) Hosts

=== Group B ===
All matches were held at the Pecangakan Stadium, Jembrana Regency.

Pos	Team	Pld	W	D	L	GF	GA	GD	Pts	Qualification	ANG	BDG	JMB	AFA	BHR
1	Putra Angkasa Kapal	4	3	1	0	10	2	+8	10	Advance to second round	—	—	1–1	—	4–0
2	PS Badung	4	3	0	1	12	5	+7	9	Advance to second round	0–2	—	—	4–1	—
3	PS Jembrana (H)	4	1	2	1	4	3	+1	5		—	0–1	—	1–1	—
4	AFA Bali Lion	4	1	1	2	6	9	−3	4		1–3	—	—	—	3–1
5	Bharata Bali	4	0	0	4	3	16	−13	0		—	2–7	0–2	—	—

Source: Liga 3 Bali
(H) Hosts

=== Group C ===
All matches were held at the Debes Stadium, Tabanan Regency.

Pos	Team	Pld	W	D	L	GF	GA	GD	Pts	Qualification	TUN	UDA	PKU	SEM	TAB
1	PS Tunas Muda Ubud	4	4	0	0	11	2	+9	12	Advance to second round	—	—	—	2–1	5–0
2	PSAD Udayana	4	3	0	1	15	3	+12	9	Advance to second round	0–2	—	5–0	—	—
3	Pro Kundalini	4	1	0	3	4	9	−5	3		1–2	—	—	—	2–0
4	Semarapura United	4	1	0	3	5	11	−6	3		—	1–6	2–1	—	—
5	Perst (H)	4	1	0	3	2	12	−10	3		—	0–4	—	2–1	—

Source: Liga 3 Bali
(H) Hosts

== Second round ==
In this round, competing teams were divided into two groups of three teams (groups X to Y). Teams in each group played one another in a round-robin, with the top two teams advanced to the knockout stage. All matches were held at the Yoga Perkanthi Stadium, Badung Regency.

All times listed below are Central Indonesia Time (WITA).

=== Group X ===
Pos	Team	Pld	W	D	L	GF	GA	GD	Pts	Qualification	BDG	ZFP	TUN
1	PS Badung	2	0	2	0	3	3	0	2	Advance to knockout stage	—	2–2	—
2	Singaraja ZFP	2	0	2	0	3	3	0	2	Advance to knockout stage	—	—	1–1
3	PS Tunas Muda Ubud	2	0	2	0	2	2	0	2		1–1	—	—

Source: Liga 3 Bali

=== Group Y ===
Pos	Team	Pld	W	D	L	GF	GA	GD	Pts	Qualification	UDA	PDN	ANG
1	PSAD Udayana	2	2	0	0	4	0	+4	6	Advance to knockout stage	—	—	3–0
2	Perseden	2	0	1	1	0	1	−1	1	Advance to knockout stage	0–1	—	—
3	Putra Angkasa Kapal	2	0	1	1	0	3	−3	1		—	0–0	—

Source: Liga 3 Bali

== Knockout stage ==
All times listed below are Central Indonesia Time (WITA).

=== Bracket ===
Semi-finals
14 September – Badung
PS Badung	2
Perseden	3
15 September – Badung
PSAD Udayana	1 (3)
Singaraja ZFP (pen.)	1 (4)

Final
18 September – Badung
Perseden (pen.)	0 (6)
Singaraja ZFP	0 (5)
Third place
17 September – Badung
PS Badung	1
PSAD Udayana	2

=== Semi-finals ===
14 September 2022
15:00

PS Badung	2–3	Perseden
Angga Pratama Wicaksana 69' (pen.); Kadek Dwi Diyan Divayana 72'	Report	Wayan Rival Adi Prastama 18'; Polycharpus Patristo Palut 85' (pen.); Genta Athif Athillah 90'

Yoga Perkanthi Stadium, Badung Regency
Referee: Khotib Ibnu Hazar

15 September 2022
15:00

PSAD Udayana	1–1 (a.e.t.)	Singaraja ZFP
Yohanes Donbosco Tenga Deba 78'	Report	Angga Febri Pradana 22'
Penalties
	3–4

Yoga Perkanthi Stadium, Badung Regency
Referee: Anak Agung Putu Atma Putera

=== Third place play-off ===
17 September 2022
15:00

PS Badung	1–2	PSAD Udayana
Kadek Arik Januarsa 58'	Report	Abdul Hamid 36'; Yohanes Donbosco Tenga Deba 88'

Yoga Perkanthi Stadium, Badung Regency
Referee: Gede Gangga Argi Putra

=== Final ===
18 September 2022
15:00

Perseden	0–0 (a.e.t.)	Singaraja ZFP
	Report
Penalties
	6–5

Yoga Perkanthi Stadium, Badung Regency
Referee: Anak Agung Putu Atma Putera
