= 2024–25 Liga 4 Bali =

Liga 4 Bali
- Season: 2024–25
- Dates: 5–19 January 2025
- Champions: Perseden (1st title)
- National phase: Perseden
- Matches: 20
- Goals: 89 (4.45 per match)
- Biggest win: PS Badung 13–0 Singaraja ZFP (11 January 2025)
- Highest scoring: PS Badung 13–0 Singaraja ZFP (11 January 2025)

The 2024–25 Liga 4 Bali was the inaugural season of Liga 4 Bali after the structural changes of Indonesian football competition and serves as a qualifying round for the national phase of the 2024–25 Liga 4. The competition will be organised by the Bali Provincial PSSI Association.

Perseden Denpasar are the four-time defending champions.

== Teams ==
=== Participating teams ===
The draw for the league was held on 8 December 2024 with 9 teams being involved.

No	Team	Location			2023 season
No	Team	District	City or regency	Map	2023 season
1	PS Badung	Kuta	Badung		Fourth place
2	PS Putra Angkasa Kapal	Mengwi	Badung		Runner-up
3	Singaraja ZFP	Singaraja	Buleleng		—
4	Undiksha	Singaraja	Buleleng		Group stage (3rd in Group A)
5	Perseden	Denpasar			Champion
6	Titan Alpha Bali	Denpasar			Group stage (3rd in Group B)
7	PS Jembrana	Negara	Jembrana		—
8	Sahadewa Galapagos United	Gianyar (town)	Gianyar		—
9	Tunas Muda Ubud	Ubud	Gianyar		—

=== Personnel and kits ===
Note: Flags indicate national team as has been defined under FIFA eligibility rules. Players and coaches may hold more than one non-FIFA nationality.

Team	Head coach	Captain	Kit manufacturer	Main kit sponsor	Other kit sponsor(s)
Perseden	(Indonesia) A.A. Bramasta	(Indonesia) I Made Antha Wijaya	(Indonesia) Renovatio	None	List: Front: None; Back: None; Sleeves: None; Shorts: None
PS Badung			(Indonesia) Evo	Bank BPD Bali	List: Front: Back: Sleeves: Shorts:
PS Jembrana	(Indonesia) Komang Mariawan		(Indonesia) Lord Apparel	PS Jembrana	List: Front: None; Back: None; Sleeves: None; Shorts: None
PS Putra Angkasa Kapal			(Indonesia) Renovatio	Badung Regency Government	List: Front: Desa Adat Kapal, Akli Bali, Le Minerale; Back: Saling Gisi D'Kampung Kapal; Sleeves: Paklina Bali; Shorts:
Sahadewa Galapagos United			(Indonesia) RMB Apparel	Daytona Lubricants	List: Front: Back: Sleeves: Shorts:
Singaraja ZFP			(Indonesia) Tino Sport	Bandar Gombal	List: Front: None; Back: Singaraja, Tino Sport; Sleeves: None; Shorts: None
Titan Alpha Bali			(Indonesia) Trent	Asianna Oriental Services	List: Front: Naughty Nuri's, Pizza Bagus; Back: AFA Bali; Sleeves: None; Shorts: None
Tunas Muda Ubud			(Indonesia) Trent	Puri Kauhan Ubud	List: Front: Casa Luna; Back: None; Sleeves: None; Shorts: None
Undiksha FC			(Indonesia) East Hooligan	Bank BPD Bali (H) / Bank Mandiri (A)	List: Front: None; Back: East Hooligan; Sleeves: None; Shorts: None

== Schedule ==
The schedule of the competition is as follows.

Round	Draw date	Matchday		Date
Round	Draw date	Groups of five	Groups of four	Date
Group stage	8 December 2024	Matchday 1	Matchday 1	5–6 January 2025
Group stage	8 December 2024	Matchday 2	Matchday 2	7–8 January 2025
Group stage	8 December 2024	Matchday 3	Matchday 3	9–10 January 2025
Group stage	8 December 2024	Matchday 4	—N/a	11 January 2025
Group stage	8 December 2024	Matchday 5	—N/a	13 January 2025
Knockout stage	8 December 2024	Semi-finals		15–16 January 2025
Knockout stage	8 December 2024	Third place play-off		18 January 2025
Knockout stage	8 December 2024	Final		19 January 2025

== Group stage ==
The draw for the group stage took place on 8 December 2024 in Denpasar. The 9 teams will be drawn into two groups. The group stage will be played in a home tournament format of single round-robin matches.

The top two teams of each group will qualify for the knockout stage.

=== Group A ===
All matches will be held at Banteng Seminyak Field, Kuta, Badung.

Pos	Team	Pld	W	D	L	GF	GA	GD	Pts	Qualification	DEN	BAD	TTN	UND	SRJ
1	Perseden	4	4	0	0	16	3	+13	12	Qualification to the Knockout stage	—	2–1	4–0	—	4–2
2	PS Badung (H)	4	3	0	1	19	3	+16	9	Qualification to the Knockout stage	—	—	2–1	—	13–0
3	Titan Alpha Bali	4	1	1	2	6	8	−2	4		—	—	—	1–1	—
4	Undiksha	4	1	1	2	6	11	−5	4		0–6	0–3	—	—	—
5	Singaraja ZFP	4	0	0	4	4	26	−22	0		—	—	1–4	1–5	—

Source: Liga 4 Bali
Rules for classification: 1) Points; 2) Head-to-head points; 3) Head-to-head goal difference; 4) Head-to-head goals scored; 5) Goal difference; 6) Goals scored; 7) Fair-play points; 8) Draw.
(H) Hosts

==== Group A Matches ====
Matchday 1 (5 January)
5 January 2025
14:00 UTC+8

Perseden	2–1	PS Badung
	Report

Banteng Seminyak Field, Badung
5 January 2025
16:00 UTC+8

Singaraja ZFP	1–4	Titan Alpha Bali
	Report

Banteng Seminyak Field, Badung

Matchday 2 (7 January)
7 January 2025
14:00 UTC+8

Undiksha	0–6	Perseden
	Report

Banteng Seminyak Field, Badung
7 January 2025
16:00 UTC+8

PS Badung	2–1	Titan Alpha Bali
	Report

Banteng Seminyak Field, Badung

Matchday 3 (9 January)
9 January 2025
14:00 UTC+8

Perseden	4–0	Titan Alpha Bali
	Report

Banteng Seminyak Field, Badung
9 January 2025
16:00 UTC+8

Singaraja ZFP	1–5	Undiksha
	Report

Banteng Seminyak Field, Badung

Matchday 4 (11 January)
11 January 2025
14:00 UTC+8

Titan Alpha Bali	1–1	Undiksha
	Report

Banteng Seminyak Field, Badung
11 January 2025
16:00 UTC+8

PS Badung	13–0	Singaraja ZFP
	Report

Banteng Seminyak Field, Badung

Matchday 5 (13 January)
13 January 2025
14:00 UTC+8

Undiksha	0–3	PS Badung

Banteng Seminyak Field, Badung
13 January 2025
16:00 UTC+8

Perseden	4–2	Singaraja ZFP

Banteng Seminyak Field, Badung

=== Group B ===
All matches will be held at Pecangakan Stadium, Negara, Jembrana.

Pos	Team	Pld	W	D	L	GF	GA	GD	Pts	Qualification	PTR	JEM	TUN	SHD
1	PS Putra Angkasa Kapal	3	3	0	0	10	2	+8	9	Qualification to the Knockout stage	—	2–1	2–1	—
2	PS Jembrana (H)	3	2	0	1	9	3	+6	6	Qualification to the Knockout stage	—	—	—	3–0
3	Tunas Muda Ubud	3	1	0	2	8	7	+1	3		—	1–5	—	—
4	Sahadewa Galapagos United	3	0	0	3	0	15	−15	0		0–6	—	0–6	—

Source: Liga 4 Bali
Rules for classification: 1) Points; 2) Head-to-head points; 3) Head-to-head goal difference; 4) Head-to-head goals scored; 5) Goal difference; 6) Goals scored; 7) Fair-play points; 8) Draw.
(H) Hosts

==== Group B Matches ====
Matchday 1 (6 January)
6 January 2025
14:00 UTC+8

PS Putra Angkasa Kapal	2–1	Tunas Muda Ubud
	Report

Pecangakan Stadium, Jembrana
6 January 2025
16:00 UTC+8

PS Jembrana	3–0	Sahadewa Galapagos United
	Report

Pecangakan Stadium, Jembrana

Matchday 2 (8 January)
8 January 2025
14:00 UTC+8

Tunas Muda Ubud	1–5	PS Jembrana
	Report

Pecangakan Stadium, Jembrana
8 January 2025
16:00 UTC+8

Sahadewa Galapagos United	0–6	PS Putra Angkasa Kapal
	Report

Pecangakan Stadium, Jembrana

Matchday 3 (10 January)
10 January 2025
14:00 UTC+8

PS Putra Angkasa Kapal	2–1	PS Jembrana
	Report

Pecangakan Stadium, Jembrana
10 January 2025
16:00 UTC+8

Sahadewa Galapagos United	0–6	Tunas Muda Ubud
	Report

Pecangakan Stadium, Jembrana

== Knockout stage ==
The knockout stage will be played as a single match. If tied after regulation time, extra time and, if necessary, a penalty shoot-out will be used to decide the winning team.

=== Bracket ===
Semi-finals
15 January 2025 – Badung
A1	Perseden	4
B2	PS Jembrana	0
16 January 2025 – Badung
B1	PS Putra Angkasa Kapal	0
A2	PS Badung	1

Final
19 January 2025 – Badung
Perseden	2
PS Badung	0
Third place play-off
18 January 2025 – Badung
PS Jembrana	1
PS Putra Angkasa Kapal	3

=== Semi-finals ===
15 January 2025
15:00 UTC+8

Perseden	4–0	PS Jembrana
	Report

Banteng Seminyak Field, Badung

16 January 2025
15:00 UTC+8

PS Putra Angkasa Kapal	0–1	PS Badung
	Report

Banteng Seminyak Field, Badung

=== Third place play-off ===
18 January 2025
15:00 UTC+8

PS Jembrana	1–3	PS Putra Angkasa Kapal
	Report

Banteng Seminyak Field, Badung

=== Final ===
19 January 2025
15:00 UTC+8

Perseden	2–0	PS Badung
	Report

Banteng Seminyak Field, Badung

== See also ==
- 2024–25 Liga 4
