= 2011–2013 Liga Indonesia Third Division (BLAI) =

Liga Indonesia Third Division
- Season: 2011–13
- Teams: 7 national; 98 Regional
- Champions: Jember United
- Promoted: Jember United; PS Gianyar; PS Badung; Persiyali Yalimo; PS Belitung Timur; UNI Bandung; Persemas FC; PS Bone Bolango; PS Bangka Tengah; Rumbai FC; Persemai Dumai; Cilegon United; Perssu Sumenep; PSHL East Leihitu; Halmahera FC; Persminsel South Minahasa; Persetab Tabalong

2011–13 Liga Indonesia Third Division is the 8th season of Liga Indonesia Third Division. The competition began in November 2011 and completed on 13 March 2013.

Jember United won the Third Division title after defeating PS Gianyar.

== Province stage ==
The whole match was held at the provincial level involving clubs in the province. Competition held to determine the qualifying event for the provincial representative to the regional level. The competition is divided into 33 provinces and managed by the respective Provincial Football Association. The competition began in November 2011 and completed in September 2012.

== Region stage ==
The whole match was held at the regional level involving top clubs from each province who are in the region. Competition conducted for qualifying event leading to the national level. The competition is divided into seven regions and is managed by the Indonesian Amateur League Board (BLAI). The competition began in January 2013 and completed on 4 March 2013.

== Knockout stage ==
Participate is 7 region winner from region stage. The competition began on 8 March 2013 and completed on 13 March 2013.

=== Qualify teams ===
- Sumatra region: PS Belitung Timur
- Java region I (Central Java/East Java/Yogyakarta): Jember United
- Java region II (Jakarta Capital Region/Banten/West Java): PS UNI Bandung
- Borneo region: Persemas F.C.
- Lesser Sunda Islands region (Bali/NTB/NTT): PS Gianyar
- Celebes region: PS Bone Bolango
- East region (Maluku/North Maluku/Papua): Persiyali Yalimo

=== Knockout Phase ===
Quarter-finals
8 March 2013 - Atang Sutrisna Stadium
Persiyali Yalimo | 3
PS Bone Bolango | 2
8 March 2013 - Atang Sutrisna Stadium
UNI Bandung | 0
Jember United | 2
8 March 2013 - Lebak Bulus Stadium
Persemas FC | 0
PS Gianyar | 1
8 March 2013 - Lebak Bulus Stadium
bye | x
PS Belitung Timur | x

Semi-finals
10 March 2013 - Lebak Bulus Stadium
PS Gianyar | 2
Persiyali Yalimo | 0
11 March 2013 - Lebak Bulus Stadium
Jember United | 1
PS Belitung Timur | 0

Final
13 March 2013 - Lebak Bulus Stadium
PS Gianyar | 0
Jember United | 2

SEMIFINALS

10 March 2013
13:30 (UTC+7)

| PS Gianyar | 2 – 0 | Persiyali Yalimo |
|---|---|---|
| I Made Arya Sudibya 2'; I Gede Andika 85' | Report |

Lebak Bulus Stadium, South Jakarta
11 March 2013
16:00 (UTC+7)

| Jember United | 1 – 0 | PS Belitung Timur |
|---|---|---|
| Galuh Triana | Report |

Lebak Bulus Stadium, South Jakarta

FINAL

13 March 2013
(UTC+7)

| Jember United | 2 – 0 | PS Gianyar |
|---|---|---|
| Galuh Triatma 22', 63' (pen.); Rahardian (red card) 55' | Report | (red card) 55' Rudaldu Alfiantus |

Lebak Bulus Stadium, South Jakarta

== Champions ==
Champions
