= 2014 Liga Nusantara Bali =

Liga Nusantara Bali
- Season: 2014

The 2014 Liga Nusantara Bali season is the first edition of Liga Nusantara Bali is a qualifying round of the 2014 Liga Nusantara.

The competition scheduled starts on 22 June 2014.

== Teams ==
Liga Nusantara Bali will be followed by seven clubs namely Pro Kundalini, Putra Tresna, Persada Jembrana, Undiksha Singaraja, Perst Tabanan, PS Gianyar, dan Tunas Muda Ubud.
