= Ganjar Mukti =

Indonesian footballer (born 1994)

Personal information
- Full name: Ganjar Mukti Muhardiyana
- Date of birth: 12 June 1994 (age 32)
- Place of birth: Tangerang, Indonesia
- Height: 1.78 m (5 ft 10 in)
- Position: Defender

Senior career*
Years	Team	Apps	(Gls)
2012–2013	PS Bengkulu	23	(6)
2013–2014	Persita Tangerang	4	(0)
2015–2016	Bali United	7	(0)
2016–2019	PS TNI	45	(1)
2016	→ PSIS Semarang (loan)	1	(0)
2019	PSIS Semarang	4	(0)
2020	Arema	0	(0)
2020	→ Persiraja Banda Aceh (loan)	1	(0)
2021–2022	Persis Solo	4	(0)
2022	→ PSM Makassar	16	(0)
2022–2023	PSM Makassar	0	(0)
2022	→ PSCS Cilacap (loan)	2	(0)
2023	Persipa Pati	1	(0)
2023–2024	Sada Sumut	7	(0)
2024–2025	Dejan	12	(0)
2025–2026	Sriwijaya	12	(0)
2026	Persipal Palu	6	(0)
- * Club domestic league appearances and goals as of 27 February 2026

Ganjar Mukti Muhardiyana (born 12 June 1994) is an Indonesian professional footballer who plays as a defender.

== Club career ==
=== PS Bengkulu ===
Ganjar joined PS Bengkulu in Divisi Utama 2013

=== Persita Tangerang ===
Ganjar joined Persita Tangerang, and made his debut in the 2014 Inter Island Cup.

=== Bali United ===
Move from Persita Tangerang and now he joined Bali United F.C. as a defender.

=== PS TNI ===
In 2016, he moved to PS TNI from Bali United with a reason to pursue his dream as Indonesian National Armed Forces.

=== PSIS Semarang ===
In September 2016, Ganjar joined PSIS Semarang. He made his debut against Persekap Pasuruan which ended 3-1 for PSIS Semarang. Ganjar provide feedback led to goals who scored by Johan Yoga.

=== Arema ===
He was signed for Arema to play in Liga 1 in the 2020 season.

==== Persiraja Banda Aceh (loan) ====
He was signed for Persiraja Banda Aceh to play in the 2020 Liga 1, on loan from Arema. This season was suspended on 27 March 2020 due to the COVID-19 pandemic. The season was abandoned and was declared void on 20 January 2021.

=== Persis Solo ===
In 2021, Ganjar Mukti signed a contract with Indonesian Liga 2 club Persis Solo. He made his first 2021–22 Liga 2 debut on 18 October 2021, coming on as a starting in a 2–0 win with Hizbul Wathan at the Manahan Stadium, Surakarta.

==== PSM Makassar (loan) ====
In 2022, Ganjar Mukti signed a contract with Indonesian Liga 1 club PSM Makassar, on loan from Persis Solo. He made his league debut on 8 January 2022 in a match against Madura United at the Ngurah Rai Stadium, Denpasar.

== Honours ==
=== Club ===
Persis Solo

- Liga 2: 2021
