= East Bali F.C. =

Indonesian football club

East Bali FC Karangasem
- Full name: East Bali Football Club Karangasem
- Nickname: Kumbang Putih dari Timur (White Panthers from the East)
- Founded: 2021; 5 years ago
- Ground: Wikrama Mandala Stadium, Amlapura, Karangasem
- Capacity: 10,000
- Chairman: Gede Pasek Suardika
- Coach: I Gede Ening Sumantra
- League: Liga 3
- 2021: Semi-finals, (Bali zone)
Home colours	Away colours

East Bali Football Club Karangasem is an Indonesian professional football club based in Karangasem Regency, Bali. Club plays in Liga 3.
