= Cengiling =

- Village
- Location within Bali
- Coordinates: 8°47′11″S 115°08′15″E
- Country: Indonesia
- Province: Bali

Cengiling is a village on the south coast of Bali, Indonesia. It lies to the west of Jimbaran. On top of the hill between Cengiling and Balangan there were plans to construct a large monument of Garuda Wisnu Kencana which would become one of the world's tallest at 125 metres.
