= Belmond Jimbaran Puri =

General information
- Location: Jalan Uluwatu, Jimbaran, Bali, Indonesia 80361
- Operator: Belmond Ltd.

Other information
- Number of rooms: 38

Website
- belmond.com/jimbaranpuri

Belmond Jimbaran Puri is a resort hotel located directly on the beach at Jimbaran Bay in Bali, Indonesia. Jimbaran is a fishing village and tourist resort, close to Ngurah Rai International Airport.

Originally developed by Pansea Hotels & Resorts and named 'Pansea Jimbaran', it was built in conjunction with a sister property - the 'Pansea Ubud' (located in Ubud), to allow guests to experience both a beach and the cultural heritage centre of the island.

Belmond Jimbaran Puri is close by a busy centuries-old seafood market and cultural sights such as Pura Luhur Uluwatu and Tanah Lot.

Accommodation consists of individual garden cottages and pool villas; there is an open air restaurant and bar and a spa on the beach. The resort was acquired by Orient-Express Hotels in 2006 and the name of the resort became Jimbaran Puri Bali. In 2014 Orient-Express Hotels changed its name to Belmond Ltd. and the hotel was renamed Belmond Jimbaran Puri
