= FSK Klungkung =

Indonesian football club

- Full name: Federasi Sepakbola Klungkung
- Nickname: Bintang Bali Timur
- Short name: FSK
- Ground: GOR Swecapura; Klungkung
- Capacity: 2,000
- Owner: PSSI Klungkung Regency
- Chairman: A.A. Gede Bagus Mahendra Putra
- League: Liga 3
- 2021: 4th in Group A, (Liga 3 Bali zone)
Home colours	Away colours

Federasi Sepakbola Klungkung (simply known as FSK) is an Indonesian football club based in Klungkung Regency, Bali. They currently compete in Liga 4 Bali zone.
