= Jimbaran =

Jimbaran ᬚᬶᬫ᭄ᬩᬭᬦ᭄
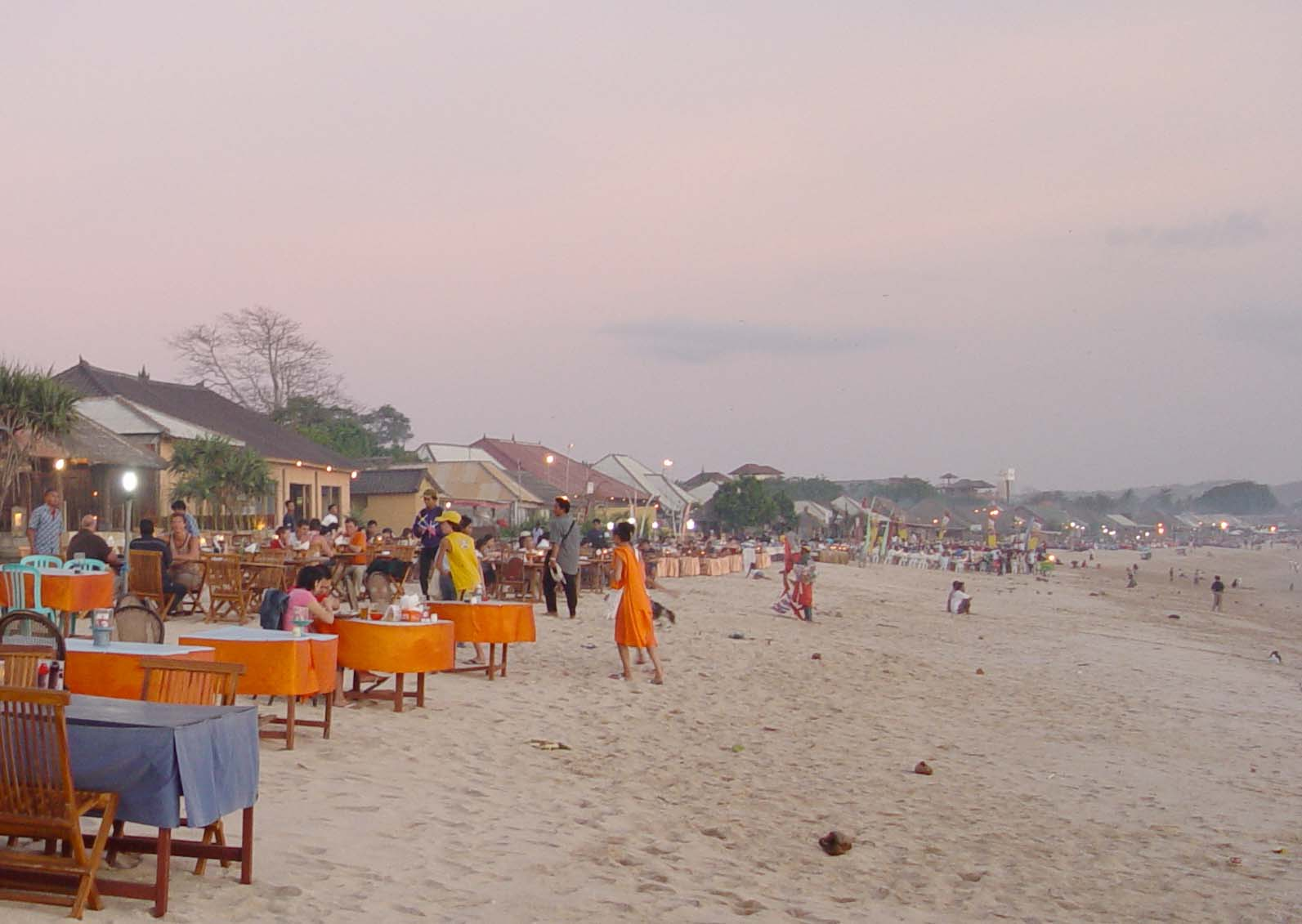
- Seafood restaurants on the beach near Jimbaran

- Location in Badung Regency and Indonesia Jimbaran (Indonesia)
- Coordinates: 8°46′10″S 115°10′26″E
- Country: Indonesia
- Province: Bali
- Regency: Badung Regency
- District: South Kuta
- Metropolitan area: Sarbagita
- Time zone: UTC+8 (Indonesia Central Time)

Jimbaran (Balinese script: ᬚᬶᬫ᭄ᬩᬭᬦ᭄) is an Indonesian fishing village and tourist resort in southern Bali, administered under South Kuta District of Badung Regency. Located south of Ngurah Rai International Airport at the "neck" of the Bukit Peninsula, the village is renowned as a culinary destination, with stalls selling seafood saturating the area. Diners select the live seafood that they wish to eat, and it is immediately prepared, generally grilled over a fire of coconut husks rather than charcoal.

Tourism in Jimbaran has increased in recent years which has boosted the local economy. The 2005 Bali bombings occurred when suicide bombers struck at two popular warungs (restaurants) along the beach. However, the tourism industry has since recovered. Jimbaran is home to numerous five-star resorts, including Belmond Jimbaran Puri, Four Seasons Resort Bali at Jimbaran Bay, InterContinental Bali Resort, Le Méridien Bali Jimbaran, Mövenpick Resort & Spa Jimbaran Bali, and Raffles Bali.

== Gallery ==
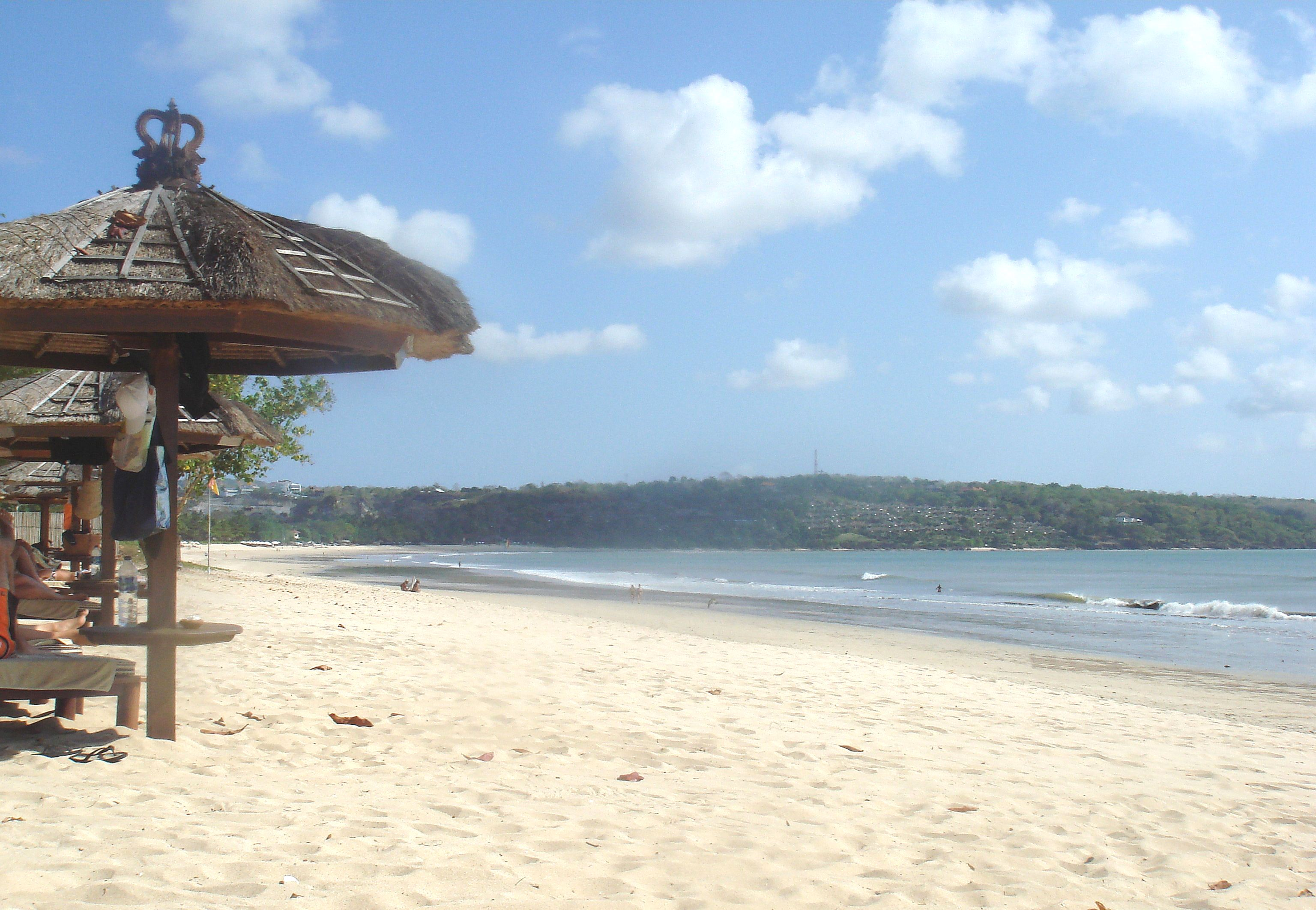
The beach, looking to the south.

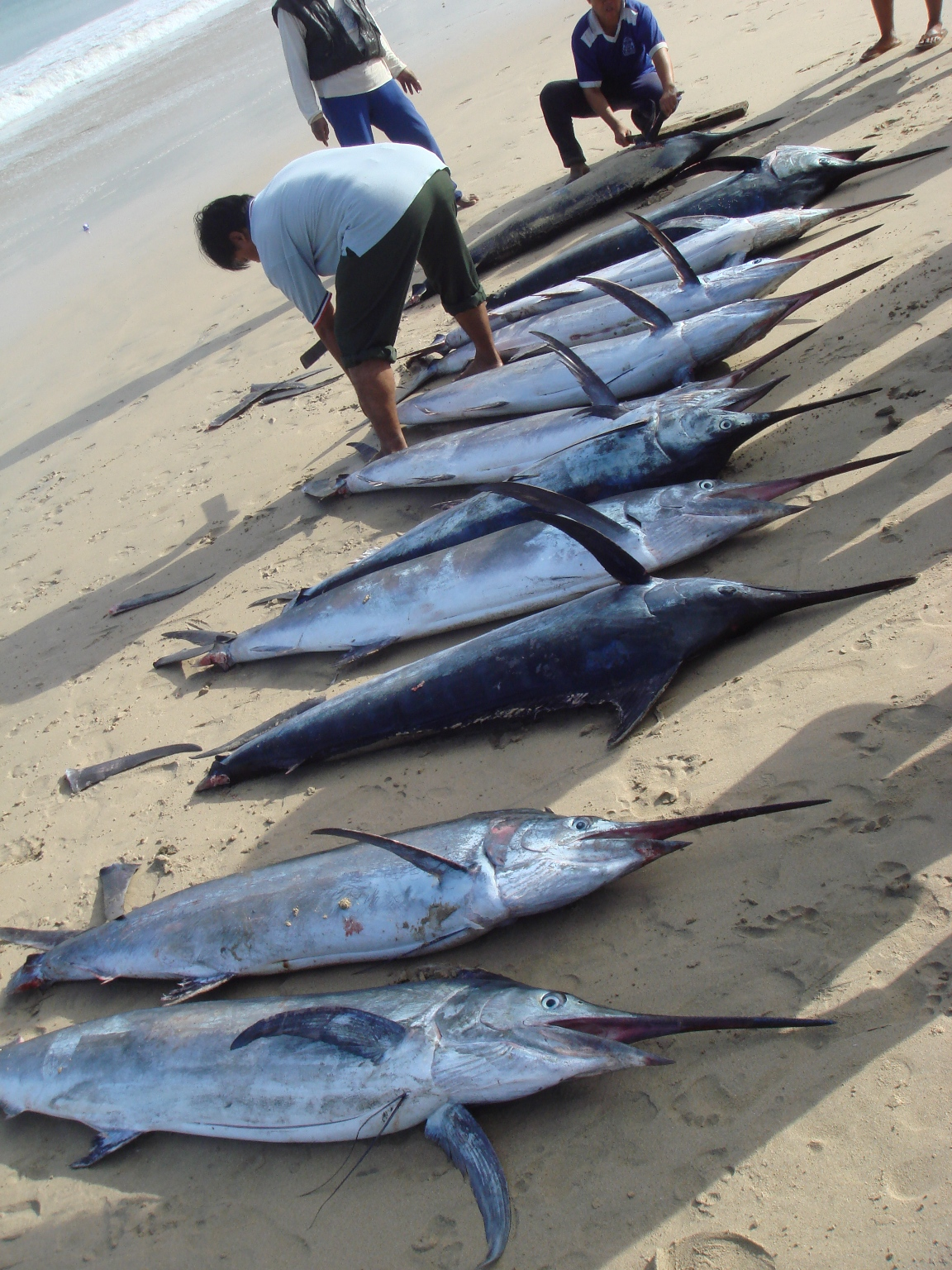
Morning catch of marlin at Jimbaran.

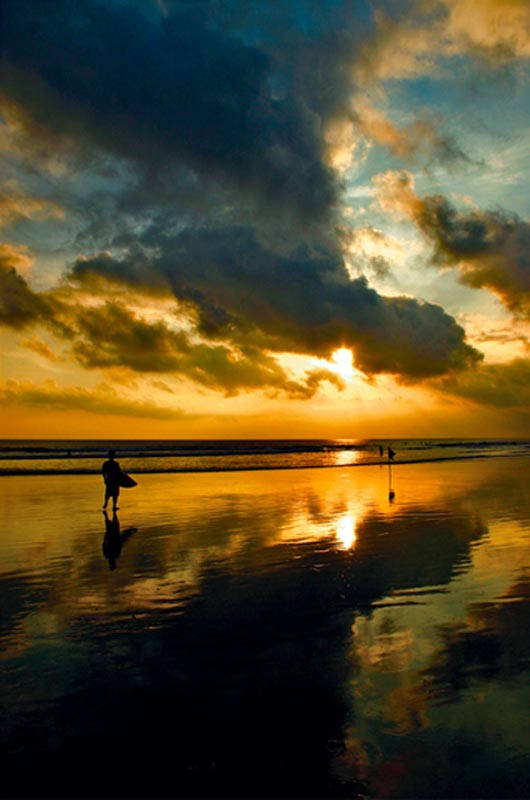
Jimbaran Beach.

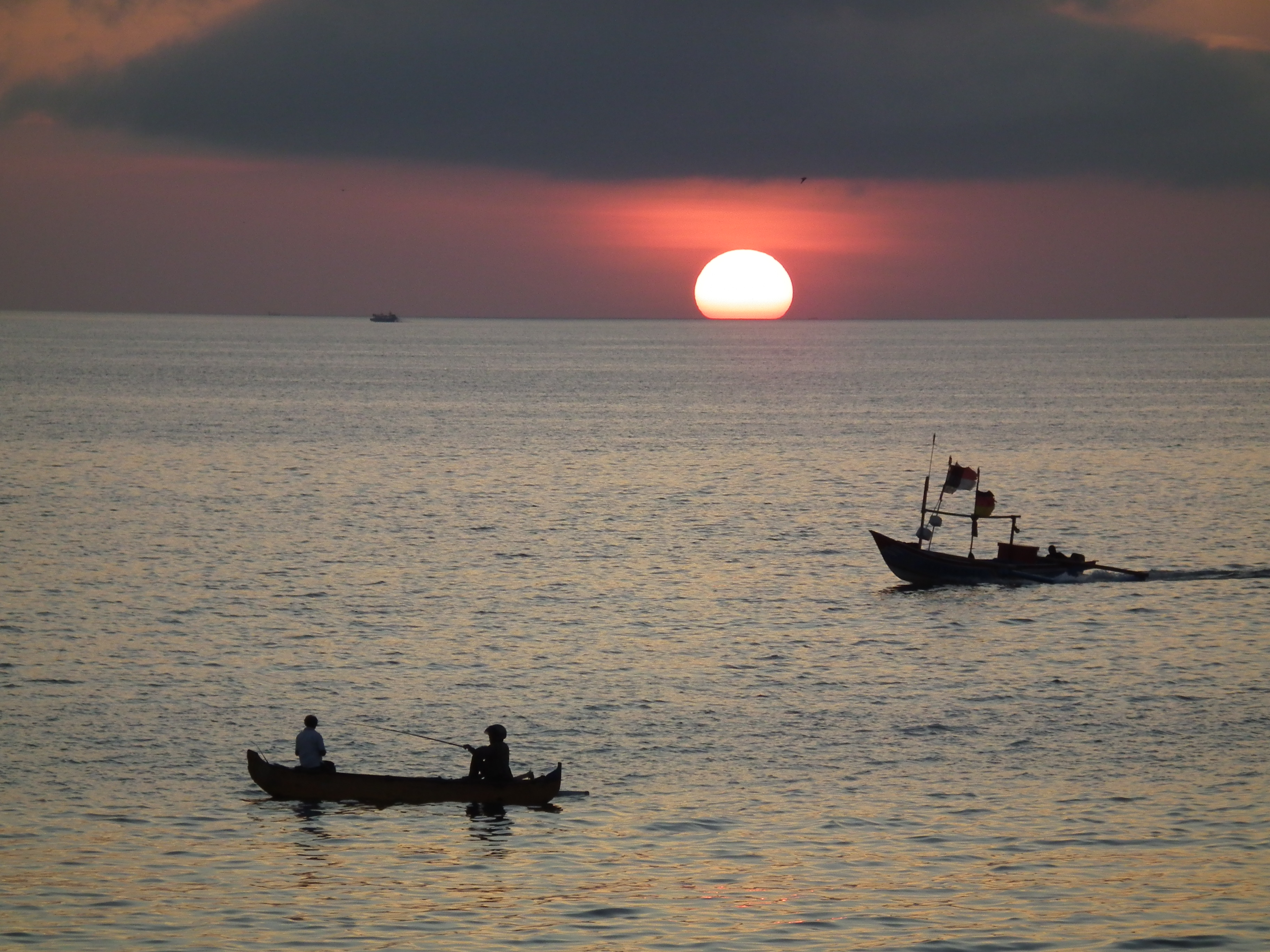
Sunset at Jimbaran Beach.

== Villages ==
- Cengiling
