= I Nengah Sulendra =

Indonesian footballer

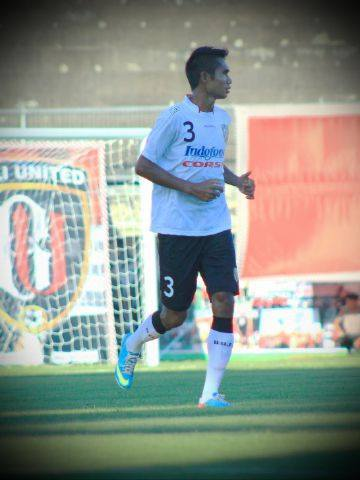

Personal information
- Full name: I Nengah Sulendra
- Date of birth: May 25, 1985 (age 41)
- Place of birth: Karangasem, Indonesia
- Height: 1.70 m (5 ft 7 in)
- Position: Defender

Senior career*
Years	Team	Apps	(Gls)
2010–2014	Bali Devata	40	(2)
2014–2016	Bali United	10	(0)
2016–2017	Perseden Denpasar	11	(0)
2018–2019	PS Badung	7	(0)
2020–2023	Perseden Denpasar	14	(0)
- * Club domestic league appearances and goals

I Nengah Sulendra (born on May 25, 1985) is an Indonesian former footballer who plays as a defender.
