= PS Putra Angkasa Kapal =

Indonesian football club

Putra Angkasa Kapal
- Full name: Persatuan Sepakbola Putra Angkasa Kapal
- Short name: PAK
- Founded: 1966; 60 years ago
- Ground: Putra Angkasa Football Field; Mengwi
- Chairman: Made Sucipta Rokana
- Manager: Putranto Ramelan
- Coach: Nyoman Ambara
- League: Liga 4
- 2024–25: 3rd, (Bali Zone)
Home colours	Away colours

Persatuan Sepakbola Putra Angkasa Kapal is an Indonesian football club based in Kapal Village, Mengwi District, Badung Regency, Bali. The team competes in Liga 4 Bali zone.

== Honours ==
- Soeratin Cup U-15 Bali
  - Champions (1): 2022
- Liga 3 Bali
  - Runners-up (1): 2023
