= PS Gianyar =

Indonesian football club

- Full name: Persatuan Sepakbola Gianyar
- Nickname: Kuda Jingkrak (Rampant Horse)
- Founded: 2011; 15 years ago
- Ground: Kapten I Wayan Dipta Stadium; Gianyar, Bali
- Capacity: 25,000
- Owner: Bali Post Media Group
- Chairman: Cokorda Gde Oka Darmayuda
- Manager: Putu Suryawan
- Coach: Edi Supriyono
- League: Liga 4
- 2021: 3rd in Second Round of Group X, (Bali zone)
Home colours	Away colours

Persatuan Sepakbola Gianyar (simply known as PS Gianyar) is an Indonesian football club based in Gianyar, Bali. They currently play in Liga 4. Their home stadium is Kapten I Wayan Dipta Stadium.

== History ==
When club named Persegi Gianyar, the club hit by financial difficulties in 2005 and decided to dissolve the club. This led to an opportunity for other clubs from Bali to merge and form a club using Persegi Gianyar's license to compete in the Liga Indonesia. Local clubs such as Perseden Denpasar, Persekaba Badung and Perst Tabanan merged with Persegi Gianyar to form a new club called Persegi Bali FC.

In 2011, the club reborn with new name PS Gianyar and started in Third Division. In 2012 season, the club became runner-up of the Third Division and got promotion to Second Division. In 2014, they play in Liga Nusantara, but fail to qualify for the national round.

== Honours ==
- Liga Indonesia Second Division
  - Runners-up (1): 2012

== Former players ==
- (Indonesia) I Made Wardana
- (Indonesia) Muhammad Fakhrudin
- (Chile) Javier Roca
