= Sultan Samma =

Indonesian footballer

Personal information
- Full name: Sultan Samma
- Date of birth: 13 April 1986 (age 40)
- Place of birth: Samarinda, Indonesia
- Height: 1.75 m (5 ft 9 in)
- Position: Midfielder

Youth career
- 2000–2006: Persisam Putra Samarinda
- 2008: PON Kaltim

Senior career*
Years	Team	Apps	(Gls)
2006–2012	Persiba Balikpapan	88	(16)
2012–2013	Sriwijaya	12	(0)
2013–2014	Gresik United	14	(4)
2014-2015	Putra Samarinda	18	(3)
2016–2023	Borneo	112	(12)
Total		244	(35)

International career
2009	Indonesia U23	5	(0)
- * Club domestic league appearances and goals

Sultan Samma (born 13 April 1986) is an Indonesian former footballer who played as a midfielder.

== International career ==
In 2009, Sultan Samma represented the Indonesia U-23, in the 2009 Southeast Asian Games.

== Honours ==
=== Club ===
Sriwijaya

- Indonesian Inter Island Cup: 2012
