= Hendra Sandi Gunawan =

Indonesian footballer

Personal information
- Full name: Hendra Sandi Gunawan
- Date of birth: 10 February 1995 (age 31)
- Place of birth: South Aceh, Indonesia
- Height: 1.70 m (5 ft 7 in)
- Position: Midfielder

Youth career
- Persal South Aceh

Senior career*
Years	Team	Apps	(Gls)
2013–2014	Persiraja Banda Aceh	10	(1)
2015–2016	Bali United	23	(0)
2017	Sriwijaya	5	(0)
2017	Persiba Balikpapan	2	(0)
2018	Aceh United	19	(1)
2019–2020	Persela Lamongan	0	(0)
2021–2022	PS Siak	12	(0)
Total		71	(2)

International career
2013–2014	Indonesia U19	16	(1)
Medal record
Men's football
Representing Indonesia
AFF U-19 Youth Championship
Winner	2013 Indonesia
- * Club domestic league appearances and goals

Hendra Sandi Gunawan (born 10 February 1995) is an Indonesian former footballer. Previously, he played for Bali United, Sriwijaya and Persiba Balikpapan in the Liga 1. He is part of the national team squad of Indonesia U-19.

== Personal life ==
Beside being a football player, he is also a member of Indonesian National Police

== Honours ==
=== International ===
Indonesia U19

- AFF U-19 Youth Championship: 2013
