= Endra Prasetya =

Indonesian footballer

Personal information
- Full name: Endra Prasetya Suprapto
- Date of birth: 1 May 1981 (age 45)
- Place of birth: Madiun, Indonesia
- Height: 1.77 m (5 ft 10 in)
- Position: Goalkeeper

Senior career*
Years	Team	Apps	(Gls)
2000–2004	Persebaya Surabaya		
2005	Persela Lamongan		
2006–2008	Persema Malang		
2008–2013	Persebaya Surabaya		
2015	Bali United		

International career
2012–2013	Indonesia	9	(0)
- * Club domestic league appearances and goals

Endra Prasetya (born 1 May 1981) is an Indonesian former footballer who plays as a goalkeeper.

== International career ==
=== National team ===
Indonesia national team
Year	Apps	Goals
2012	7	0
2013	2	0
Total	9	0

== Honours ==
=== Club honours ===
Persebaya Surabaya

- Liga Indonesia First Division (1): 2003
- Liga Indonesia Premier Division (1): 2004
