= PS Jembrana =

Indonesian football club

- Full name: Persatuan Sepakbola Jembrana
- Nickname: Laskar Mekepung
- Ground: Stadion Pecangkan; Negara, Bali
- Capacity: 10,000
- Owner: Askab PSSI Jembrana
- Chairman: I Ketut Tulis
- Coach: Abdul Kharim
- League: Liga 4
- 2024–25: 4th, (Bali zone)
Home colours	Away colours

PS Jembrana (formerly known as Persada Jembrana) is an Indonesian football club based in Negara, Jembrana Regency, Bali. They currently compete in the Liga 4.

== Honours ==
- Liga 3 Bali
  - Runners-up: 2021
