= PSAD Kodam IX/Udayana =

Indonesian football club

PSAD Udayana
- Full name: Persatuan Sepakbola Angkatan Darat Komando Daerah Militer/IX Udayana
- Nickname: The Army
- Ground: Ngurah Rai Stadium; Denpasar, Bali
- Capacity: 12,000
- Owner: IX Military Regional Command/Udayana
- Coach: Doni Kristian
- League: Liga 3
- 2022: Liga 3 Bali, 3rd
Home colours	Away colours

PSAD Udayana is an Indonesian football club located in Denpasar, Bali. The team competes in Liga 3, the lowest tier of the Indonesian football league system.

== Honours ==
- Liga 3 Bali
  - Third-place (2): 2019, 2022
