= Singaraja Zona Fair Play F.C. =

Indonesian football club

Singaraja ZFP
- Full name: Singaraja Zona Fair Play Football Club
- Nickname: The Lions
- Short name: SZFP
- Founded: 2022; 4 years ago
- Ground: Mayor Metra Stadium, Singaraja
- Capacity: 2,000
- Coach: Ferry Winarko
- League: Liga 4
- 2024–25: 5th, in Group A (Bali zone)
Home colours	Away colours

Singaraja Zona Fair Play Football Club (simply known as Singaraja ZFP) is an Indonesian football club located in Singaraja, Buleleng, Bali. The team competes in Liga 4, the lowest tier of the Indonesian football league system.

== Honours ==
- Liga 3 Bali
  - Runner-up: 2022
