= Amadeus Suropati =

Indonesian-Australian footballer (born 1985)

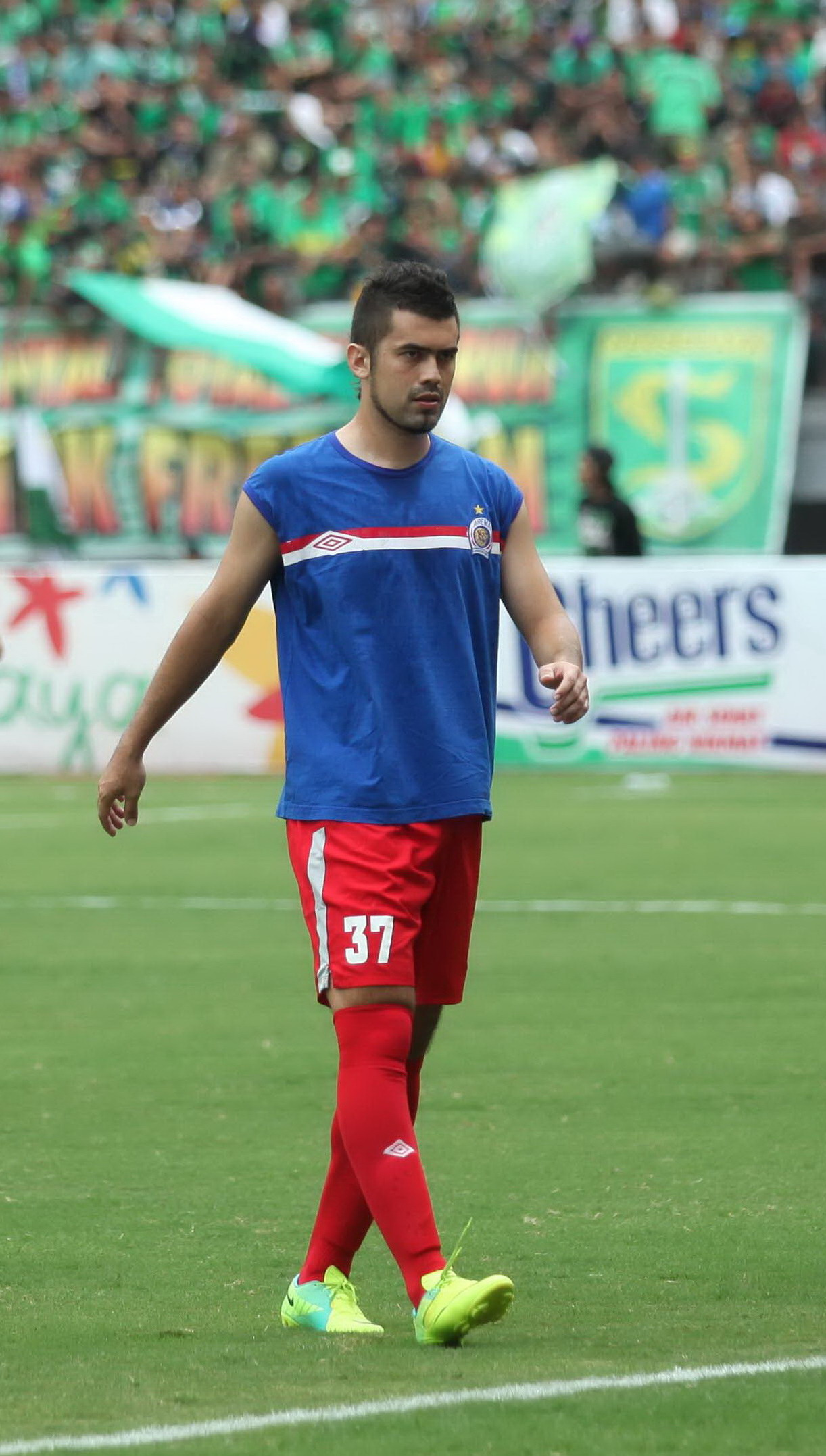

Personal information
- Full name: Amadeus Suropati
- Date of birth: 31 December 1985 (age 40)
- Place of birth: Denpasar, Indonesia
- Height: 1.86 m (6 ft 1 in)
- Position: Striker

Youth career
- 2001: Gianni Oddone Academy
- 2002: Persekaba Badung
- 2003: PSIM Yogyakarta
- 2004: Canberra City FC

Senior career*
Years	Team	Apps	(Gls)
2008–2009	Deltras Sidoarjo		
2009–2010	ISA Lions	15	(10)
2010–2011	Brandon Park FC	12	(8)
2010–2011	Brunswick City	20	(15)
2011–2012	CN Canning International	12	(5)
2011–2012	Forrestfield United SC	14	(9)
2012–2013	Arema FC		
2014–2015	Pusamania Borneo		
2015–2016	Bali United		
- * Club domestic league appearances and goals as of 19 January 2015

Amadeus Suropati (born 31 December 1985) is an Indonesian-Australian former footballer who previously played for Bali United in the Indonesia Super League. He plays as a striker

Amadeus began his career attending the Gianni Oddone Football Academy in Torino, Italy where he won trophy for Best Player of 2001 Academy U-17 International Summer Stage Tournament.

He continued his career in Indonesia, playing in the national youth league for two professional clubs Persekaba Badung U-16 and PSIM Jogjakarta U-18. In 2004, he then traveled to Australia to play in the ACT U-19 Premier League representing Canberra City FC. There he won the Golden Boot 2004 for Top Scorer U-19.

He returned to Indonesia in 2005 and played for several local clubs before signing on to his first professional senior contract in 2008 with the Indonesian super league club Deltras Sidoarjo for a year before returning to Australia.

In 2010, he played for Brunswick City in Melbourne and then he join Forrestfield United in Perth where he won the state league 1 champion title. After 2 years of play in Australia, he received an offer from Arema Indonesia and played half season in the breakaway Indonesian Premier League.

He joined Pusamania Borneo FC in 2014 which became champion and was promoted into the Super League. He then decide to join his home town club Bali United where he played in the 2015 Indonesian Super League before the league stopped due to the conflicts between the federation and the government that caused force majeure.

He left Indonesia after FIFA banned Indonesian football in 2015.

== Honours ==
- Liga Indonesia Premier Division
  - Champions: 2014
