= Ganesha University of Education =

University in Bali, Indonesia

Universitas Pendidikan Ganesha
- Motto: Dharmaning sajjana umerdhyaken widyaguna
- Type: Perguruan Tinggi Negeri
- Established: 11 May 2006
- Parent institution: Kementerian Pendidikan, Kebudayaan, Riset, dan Teknologi
- Rector: Prof. Dr. I Nyoman Jampel, M.Pd
- Location: Singaraja, Bali, Kabupaten Buleleng, Indonesia
- Colors: Biru baja
- Website: www.undiksha.ac.id
- 200px|Logo undiksha

Universitas Pendidikan Ganesha (Undiksha) is a university located in Bali, Indonesia. It was developed based on Pancasila and Undang-undang Dasar 1945 that upholds human values, produces education personnel, and non-education personnel who are devoted to God Almighty, have high academic-professional abilities, develop science, technology, and art.

Undiksha has the motto "dharmaning sajjana umerdhyaken widyaguna" (the obligation of wise people is to develop knowledge and character). As one of the best educational campuses in Bali, Undiksha has several campus locations spread across two regencies. Each can be used as a place for lectures and practicums by study programs according to the provisions of the institution. The organization of educational services is carried out centrally through Undiksha Central Campus located in Singaraja City, Buleleng Regency, Bali.

== Timelines ==
Until now Undiksha has produced more than thirty-three thousand graduates who are mostly educators. Undiksha's history begins with the B-1 Course to provide Indonesian Language Teachers in 1955 and Commerce Teachers in 1957 for high school level. The brief history is as follows:

Date	History
1955	B1 Indonesian course to prepare senior high school teachers
1957	B1 Commerce Course to prepare senior high school teachers
Januari 1962	The two types of courses were merged into the Faculty of Teacher Training and Education, Universitas Airlangga
Agustus 1962	Faculty of Teacher Training and Education or merged with Udayana University
1963	The Faculty of Teacher Training and Education became part of the h of IKIP Malang in Singaraja
1968	FKIP became the Faculty of Teacher Training and Faculty of Education again became part of Udayana University
1981	F.Kg. and FIP were merged into the Faculty of Teacher Training and Education at Udayana University
1993	FKIP separated from Unud to become Sekolah Tinggi Keguruan dan Ilmu Pendidikan Singaraja
2001	STKIP Singaraja became the Institut Keguruan dan Ilmu Pendidikan Negeri Singaraja
2006	IKIP Negeri Singaraja became Universitas Pendidikan Ganesha

== Faculties ==
- Faculty of Languages and Arts
- Faculty of Education
- Faculty of Law and Social Sciences
- Faculty of Mathematics and Natural Sciences
- Faculty of Sports and Health
- Engineering and Vocational Faculty
- Faculty of Economics
- Faculty of Medicine
