= Naughty Nuri's =

Indonesian restaurant chain

- Company type: Private
- Industry: Restaurant franchise
- Founded: 1995 in Ubud, Bali, Indonesia
- Founders: Isnuri Suryatmi, Brian Kenney Aldinger
- Headquarters: Ubud, Bali

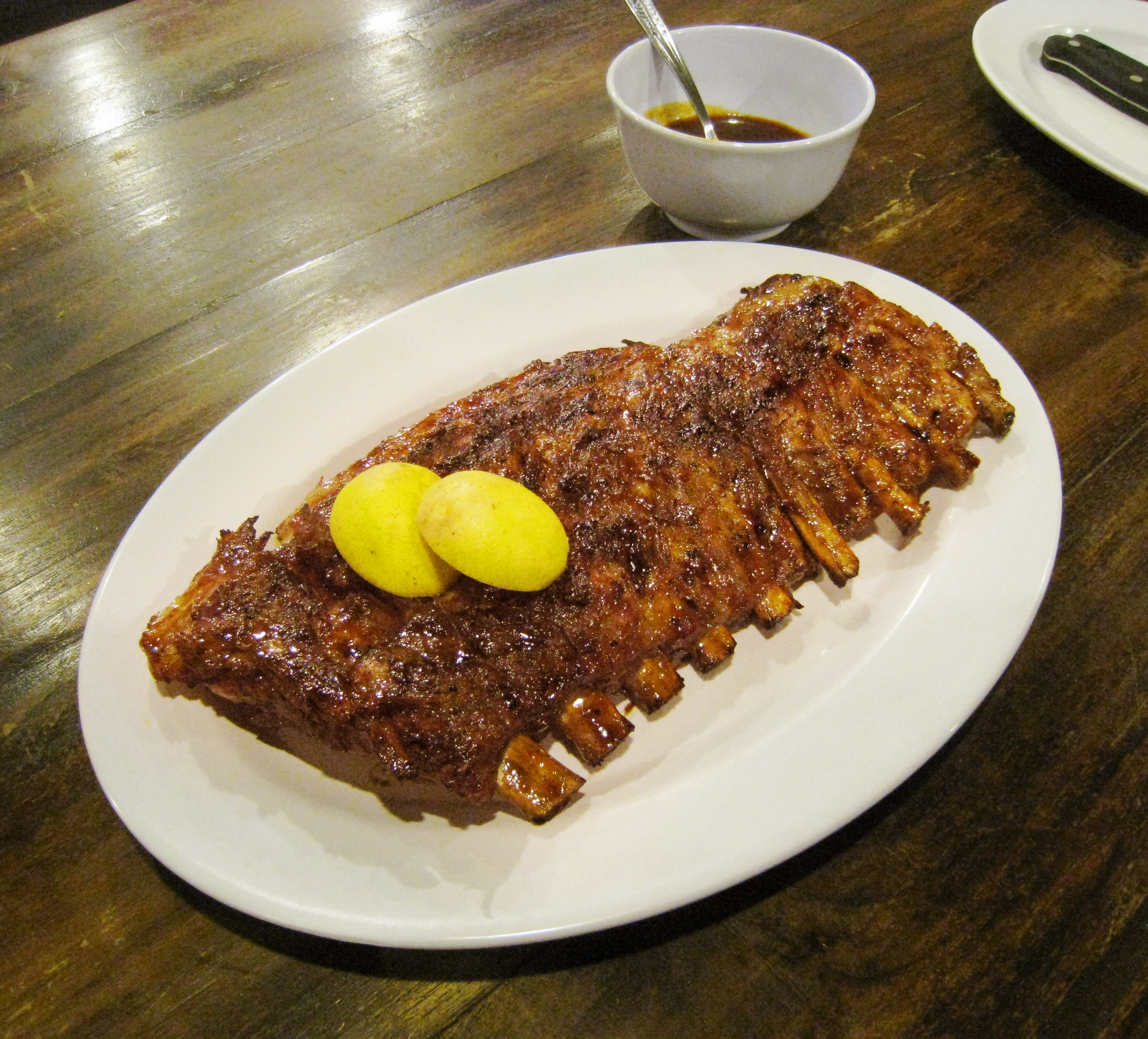
A plate of Balinese roasted pork ribs, at Naughty Nuri's

Naughty Nuri's is a restaurant franchise based in Ubud, Bali. It is known for barbecued pork ribs and martinis, which Anthony Bourdain has called "the best martinis in the world." It was featured in The Guardian as one of the Top 10 places to eat in Ubud, Bali in 2011.

In 1995, Naughty Nuri's was founded by Isnuri "Nuri" Suryatmi and her husband Brian Kenney Aldinger, who came from New York. The restaurant got its name from Suryatmi's nickname, Nuri. Aldinger died in 2012.

The franchise has four locations in Bali, a location in Jakarta, locations in Melbourne, Australia, Macau, China, Phuket, Thailand and Malaysia, including four locations in Kuala Lumpur.

The original warung location is open to the road, has a corrugated metal roof, and the walls are decorated with framed photos, posters and old knick-knacks. There is an outside grill next to a basin of barbecue sauce which is used to make the restaurant's signature ribs. Naughty Nuri's basic menu includes barbecued spare ribs, lamb and pork chops, beer and dirty martinis. Naughty Nuri's is the latest outlet in the famous franchise.
