= Ngurah Rai Stadium =

Stadium in Indonesia

I Gusti Ngurah Rai Stadium
- Stadion Ngurah Rai
- Location in Denpasar, Bali and Indonesia I Gusti Ngurah Rai Stadium (Bali) I Gusti Ngurah Rai Stadium (Indonesia)
- Address: Jl. Melati, Dangin Puri Kangin, North Denpasar, Denpasar City, Bali 80234; Indonesia
- Location: Denpasar, Bali
- Coordinates: 8.650697°S 115.223508°E
- Owner: Perseden Denpasar
- Operator: Government of Denpasar City
- Capacity: 12,000
- Surface: Grass field

Tenant
- Perseden Denpasar

Ngurah Rai Stadium is a multi-purpose stadium in Denpasar, Indonesia. It is currently used mostly for football matches. It is the home of the Perseden Denpasar football club. The stadium holds 12,000 people.
