= Perseden Denpasar =

Indonesian football club

Perseden
- Full name: Persatuan Sepakbola Denpasar
- Nickname: Laskar Catur Muka
- Founded: 1969; 57 years ago
- Ground: Kompyang Sujana Stadium, Denpasar, Bali
- Capacity: 7,000
- Owner: PSSI Denpasar City Association
- Manager: I Made Diatmika
- Coach: F.X. Yanuar Wahyu
- League: Liga Nusantara
- 2025–26: Liga Nusantara/Regular Round (Group D), 3rd
Home colours	Away colours

Persatuan Sepakbola Denpasar, commonly known as Perseden Denpasar is an Indonesian football club located in Denpasar, Bali. They set to competes in Liga Nusantara from 2025–26, the third tier of the Indonesian football after promotion from Liga 4.

== History ==
Perseden was founded in 1969.

Perseden in 1991 competed in the Second Division of Perserikatan where they won by beating PSBL Bandar Lampung 1–0 in the final. After Perserikatan and Galatama were merged into Liga Indonesia, their best achievement was reaching the last four in the 1996–97 First Division season.

However, it was only in the 2003 season that they competed at the highest level of Indonesian football for the first time after being runner-up in the 2002 First Division season. Only a season competed in the Premier Division, they must be relegated again after failed in the relegation play-offs.

At the end of 2016, Perseden won the 2016 ISC Liga Nusantara, an unofficial Liga Nusantara season due to FIFA suspension, after beating PSN 2–0 in the final.

Perseden was secured promotion to Liga Nusantara for the first time in their from 2025–26 season after a 2–1 win over Persema Malang on 15 May 2025 at UNS Stadium, Surakarta in the Liga 4 national phase third round at Group D and advanced to fourth round.

== Stadium ==
Perseden plays their home matches at Kompyang Sujana Stadium, Denpasar. They often plays their home matches at Ngurah Rai Stadium, Denpasar.

== Supporters ==
Laskar Catur Muka is the name of the supporters of Perseden Denpasar.

== Players ==
=== Current squad ===
As of 15 June 2026

Note: Flags indicate national team as defined under FIFA eligibility rules; some limited exceptions apply. Players may hold more than one non-FIFA nationality.

No.	Pos.	Nation	Player
1	GK	IDN	Jhuan Rico
2	DF	IDN	Firland Supriadi
5	MF	IDN	I Kadek Juliantara
6	MF	IDN	Fadly Saputra
8	FW	IDN	Larsan Holo
11	MF	IDN	Bintang Seme
13	DF	IDN	Agus Prasetiyo
15	MF	IDN	I Wayan Adinata
16	MF	IDN	Reza Irfana
17	FW	IDN	I Nyoman Sukarja
21	FW	IDN	Kadek Yoga Prasetya
23	MF	IDN	Firman Assidhiq
24	DF	IDN	Komang Rama Ardika
25	FW	IDN	I Ketut Dedi Setiyawan
26	MF	IDN	I Made Antha Wijaya (captain)

No.	Pos.	Nation	Player
27	DF	IDN	Ananta Putra
28	FW	IDN	Andre Lende
29	DF	IDN	Gerry Wilson
31	FW	IDN	Alfian Arfarid
35	MF	IDN	Subri Umarella
56	GK	IDN	Bima Aidi
57	MF	IDN	I Kadek Ari Premana
69	GK	IDN	Faizal Hariyono
77	MF	IDN	Danil Reza
80	MF	IDN	Ilham Khabib
87	DF	IDN	Komang Dedi (on loan from Bali United)
90	FW	IDN	Nathan Suarnatya
92	MF	IDN	Bagus Bramastha
95	GK	IDN	I Komang Adi Wiraguna
97	DF	IDN	I Komang Aldita

== Season by season records ==
Season	League/Division	Tms.	Pos.	Piala Indonesia
1994–95	First Division	16	4th, First round	–
1995–96	First Division	24	4th, First round	–
1996–97	First Division	20	4	–
1997–98	First Division	season abandoned		–
1998–99	First Division	19	3rd, First round	–
1999–2000	First Division	21	3rd, Second round	–
2001	First Division	23	4th, First round	–
2002	First Division	27	2	–
2003	Premier Division	20	15	–
2004	First Division	24	8th, East division	–
2005	First Division	30	4th, Group 3	First round
2006	First Division	36	Withdrew	–
2007				
2008–09
2009–10
2010–11	Third Division		2nd, Foruth round	–
2012	Second Division (LPIS)	100	3	–
2013	First Division	77	Second round	–
2014	First Division	73	3rd, Third round	–
2015	Liga Nusantara	season abandoned		–
2016	ISC Liga Nusantara	32	1	–
2017	Liga 3	32	Eliminated in Provincial round	–
2018	Liga 3	32	Eliminated in Provincial round	–
2019	Liga 3	32	Second round	–
2020	Liga 3	season abandoned		–
2021–22	Liga 3	64	3rd, Second round	–
2022–23	Liga 3	season abandoned		–
2023–24	Liga 3	80	3rd, First round	–
2024–25	Liga 4	64	3rd, Fourth round	–
2025–26	Liga Nusantara	24	3rd, Group D	–
2026–27	Liga Nusantara	24	TBD	–

== Honours ==
- Perserikatan Second Division:
  - Winners (1): 1991–92
- Liga Indonesia First Division:
  - Runners-up (1): 2002
- ISC Liga Nusantara
  - Winners (1): 2016
- Liga 3 Bali:
  - Winners (4): 2019, 2021, 2022, 2023
  - Runners-up (2): 2017, 2018
- Liga 4 Bali:
  - Winners (1): 2024–25
