= Perst Tabanan =

Indonesian football club

Perst
- Full name: Persatuan Sepakbola Tabanan
- Nickname: Laskar Ciung Wanara
- Founded: 1938; 88 years ago
- Ground: Debes Stadium; Tabanan, Bali
- Capacity: 2,500
- Owner: PSSI Tabanan Regency
- Coach: Ngurah Jovi Saputra
- League: Liga 4
- 2022: 5th in Group C, (Liga 3 Bali zone)
Home colours	Away colours

Persatuan Sepakbola Tabanan (simply known as Perst) is an Indonesian football club based in Tabanan Regency, Bali. They currently compete in Liga 4 Bali zone. The club plays its home matches at Debes Stadium.
