= PS Badung =

Indonesian football club

- Full name: Persatuan Sepakbola Badung
- Nicknames: Naga Besukih (Besukih Dragon); Laskar Keris (Keris Warriors)
- Founded: 2008; 18 years ago
- Ground: Gelora Samudra Stadium; Badung, Bali
- Capacity: 5,000
- Owner: Askab PSSI Badung
- Head coach: I Nyoman Sujata
- League: Liga 4
- 2025–26: 1st, (Bali zone)
Home colours	Away colours

Persatuan Sepakbola Badung is an Indonesian football club based in Badung Regency, Bali, Indonesia that competes in Liga 4. Nicknamed Laskar Keris (Keris Warriors), the club was founded in 2008.

== History ==
After Persekaba Badung sold to Yahukimo Regency government and changed to Yahukimo FC, Badung Regency did not have a representative in Liga Indonesia. In 2008, Badung football rise again with new club, PS Badung. They competed from Liga Indonesia Third Division Lesser Sunda Islands Region and keep going until in December 2014, they were promoted to the Liga Indonesia Premier Division after becoming 4th placed team in 2014 Liga Nusantara.

== Stadium ==
PS Badung plays their home matches at Gelora Samudra Stadium in Kuta.

== Players ==
=== Current squad ===
As of 8 July 2017.

Note: Flags indicate national team as defined under FIFA eligibility rules; some limited exceptions apply. Players may hold more than one non-FIFA nationality.

No.	Pos.	Nation	Player
3	DF	IDN	I Nengah Sulendra (captain)
7	MF	IDN	I Ketut Tirta Nadi Wardana
8	MF	IDN	I Wayan Gede Bayu Yusa
9	FW	IDN	Stelwan Morens Maarisit
10	FW	IDN	I Gede Warih Sentanu
11	MF	IDN	Wahyu Nugroho Aji
12	MF	IDN	I Komang Buda Nugraha
13	MF	IDN	Imam Al Gazali
14	DF	IDN	Taji Prasetyo
15	DF	IDN	I Putu Adi Purwanta
18	MF	IDN	Wahyu Permana

No.	Pos.	Nation	Player
20	FW	IDN	Syaiful Aris
21	FW	IDN	I Gede Rio Andreawan Yubi
25	MF	IDN	I Wayan Agus Eka Putra
27	FW	IDN	Rasmoyo
28	GK	IDN	I Gusti Putu Ngurah Yogi Setiawan
30	GK	IDN	I Putu Febri Andika
35	DF	IDN	Mohammad Umam Sujatmiko
37	MF	IDN	Ryan Egi Saputra
44	DF	IDN	Satrio Aji
91	DF	IDN	Dedeyan Surdani

== Club officials ==
=== Coaching staff ===
Role	Name
Manager	(Indonesia) I Nyoman Graha Wicaksana
Head coach	(Indonesia) I Nyoman Sujata
Assistant coach	(Indonesia) Agus Tiono
Goalkeeper coach	(Indonesia) Fredy Herlambang

=== Managerial history ===
Dates	Name	Notes
2013	(Indonesia) I Nyoman Sujata	
2014	(Indonesia) Alexander Saununu	
2015	(Indonesia) I Nyoman Ambara	
2017	(Indonesia) Syahrial Efendi	Sacked
2017	(Indonesia) I Nyoman Sujata	

== Season-by-season records ==
Season	League	Tier	Tms.	Pos.	Piala Indonesia
2013	Second Division	4	73	3rd, Third round	–
2014	First Division	3	73	2nd, Fourth round	–
2014	Liga Nusantara	4		4	–
2015	Premier Division	2	55	did not finish	–
2016	ISC B	2	53	Withdrew	–
2017	Liga 2	2	61	5th, Group 7	–
2018	Liga 3	3	32	3rd, First round	First round
2019	Liga 3	3	32	Eliminated in Provincial round	First round
2020					
2021–22
2022–23
2023–24	Liga 3	3	80	Eliminated in Provincial round	–
2024–25	Liga 4	4	64	Eliminated in Provincial round	–
2025–26	Liga 4	4	64	TBD	–

== Honours ==
- Liga 4 Bali:
  - Winners (1): 2025–26
