= 2025–26 Liga 4 Central Java =

Liga 4 Central Java
- Season: 2025–26
- Dates: 3 January – 16 February 2026
- Champions: Persibangga (1st title)
- National phase: Persibangga; Persak; Persiharjo; Persebi
- Matches: 56
- Goals: 174 (3.11 per match)

The 2025–26 Liga 4 Central Java will be the second season of Liga 4 Central Java after the structural changes of Indonesian football competition and serves as a qualifying round for the national phase of the 2025–26 Liga 4. The competition is organised by the Central Java Provincial PSSI Association.

Persebi Boyolali are the defending champions.

== Teams ==
=== Teams changes ===
The following teams changed division after the 2024–25 season.

From Liga 4 Central Java
▲ Promoted to Liga Nusantara
- Persika Karanganyar

To Liga 4 Central Java
▼ Relegated from Liga Nusantara
- PSCS Cilacap

=== Participating teams ===
A total of 26 teams are competing in this season.

Locations of teams in the 2025–26 Liga 4 Central Java.
Brown: Group A; Cyan: Group B; Orange: Group C; Yellow: Group D; Pink: Group E;
Green: Group F; Blue: Group G

Team	Location	Stadium	Capacity	2024–25 season
Bhayangkara Muda	Semarang	Citarum	7,000	—
ISP Purworejo	Purworejo	Sarwo Edhie WIbowo	1,000	—
Mahesa Jenar Muda	Semarang	Wisesa Soccer Field, at Demak	0	—
Persak Kebumen	Kebumen	Sarwo Edhie Wibowo, at Purworejo (Note: Due to the ongoing renovation of Chandradimuka Stadium, Persak will play their home matches at Sarwo Edhie Wibowo Stadium in Purworejo)	1,000	Quarter-finalist
Persebi Boyolali	Boyolali	Kebogiro	12,000	Champions
Persibangga Purbalingga	Purbalingga	Goentoer Darjono	15,000	—
Persibara Banjarnegara	Banjarnegara	Sumitro Kolopaking	10,000	—
Persibas Banyumas	Banyumas	Satria	20,000	—
Persibat Batang	Batang	Moh Sarengat	15,000	Semi-finalist
Persiharjo Sukoharjo	Sukoharjo	Gelora Merdeka	10,000	Preliminary round (5th in Group B)
Persik Kendal	Kendal	Kebondalem	12,000	Preliminary round (6th in Group A)
Persikaba Blora	Blora	Kridaloka	10,000	—
Persikama Magelang	Magelang	Amerta	20,000	Preliminary round (5th in Group C)
Persipur Purwodadi	Purwodadi	Krida Bakti	10,000	Preliminary round (4th in Group B)
Persitema Temanggung	Temanggung	Bhumi Phala	7,000	Preliminary round (4th in Group C)
PPSM Magelang	Magelang	Moch. Soebroto	30,000	Quarter-finalist
PSD Demak	Demak	Sultan Fatah	5,000	Quarter-finalist
PSIK Klaten	Klaten	Trikoyo	3,000	—
PSIP Pemalang	Pemalang	Mochtar	4,000	—
PSIR Rembang	Rembang	Krida	10,000	Preliminary round (6th in Group B)
PSIW Wonosobo	Wonosobo	Gelora Pancasila	15,000	Preliminary round (3rd in Group C)
Revo	Semarang	Citarum	7,000	—
Safin Pati	Pati	Gelora Soekarno Mojoagung	5,000	—
Slawi United	Slawi	Trisanja	12,000	Preliminary round (4th in Group A)
Wijayakusuma	Cilacap	Wijayakusuma	10,000	Preliminary round (6th in Group C)
Wisesa	Semarang	Wisesa Soccer Field, at Demak	0	—

=== Personnel and kits ===
Note: Flags indicate national team as has been defined under FIFA eligibility rules. Players and coaches may hold more than one non-FIFA nationality.

Team	Head coach	Captain	Kit manufacturer	Main kit sponsor	Other kit sponsor(s)
Bhayangkara Muda			(Indonesia) Made by club	None	List: Front: None; Back: None; Sleeves: None; Shorts: None
ISP Purworejo	(Indonesia) Sri Nandha		(Indonesia) Fairness	Hutama Sakti	List: Front: None; Back: Nocturnal Game House; Sleeves: None; Shorts: None
Mahesa Jenar Muda	(Indonesia)		(Indonesia) Defender	Defender	List: Front: None; Back: None; Sleeves: None; Shorts: None
Persak	(Indonesia) Gatot Barnowo		(Indonesia) Fortwear	SKN Group	List: Front: Tradha Group, ZiZa Catering; Back: Letter Ale, Bank Jateng; Sleeves: Malindo Corner, Yun’s Accessories; Shorts: None
Persebi	(Indonesia) Sri Widadi		(Indonesia) Oliver	Bank Jateng	List: Front: Migunani Segami; Back: Saudi Chicken, BPR BKK Boyolali, Bank Boyolali, PT Karya Utama Bangkit, PT Aneka Karya Boyolali, Ulam Jaya Barokah; Sleeves: Pandawa 87, Cleo Pure Water; Shorts: None
Persibangga	(Indonesia) Imran Amirullah		(Indonesia) Kubangga^{2}	Vitameal	List: Front: BRUV, PT Abhimata Emas Juara, You & Milk, Minyak Herba Sinergi; Back: Owabong Waterpark, Herbatech; Sleeves: None; Shorts: None
Persibara	(Indonesia) Agus Riyanto		(Indonesia) Dipayudha^{2}	CV Restu Jaya	List: Front: AMF, CV Akar Mas Curva, Geo Dipa Energi; Back: Bank Jateng, AKRM Plafon; Sleeves: Diklat Merden Indonesia; Shorts: None
Persibas	(Indonesia) Agus Yuniardi		(Indonesia) Trops	PT Harya Dewa	List: Front: TJ Group, Kresna Setia Negara, Kebun Buah Batur Agung, Toko Bangunan Wana Arta Jaya, Universitas Muhammadiyah Purwokerto, PT Satria Buana Pamula Sakti, PT Putra Wirasaba Asli; Back: Ayu Sekti Group, Adisatrya Center, Hastina Property; Sleeves: None; Shorts: None
Persibat	(Indonesia) Lukas Tumbuan		(Indonesia) Arafs Apparel	Optik B. Riski	List: Front: Kawasan Industri Terpadu Batang; Back: None; Sleeves: None; Shorts: None
Persiharjo	(Indonesia) Dwi Joko		(Indonesia) Oliver	GMABAR	List: Front: PT Sidomulyo Elektrik Indonesia, GiNaSTel; Back: Grafindo, Istana Kado Ulya, Kopi Mbahman, Bank Jateng, Gociko Snack; Sleeves: None; Shorts: None
Persik Kendal	(Indonesia) Achmad Yasin		(Indonesia) Estaft	Pemkab Kendal	List: Front: Universitas Muhammadiyah Kendal Batang, Charlie Hospital; Back: Aguaria, Bank Jateng; Sleeves: balé by BTN; Shorts: None
Persikaba	(Indonesia) Gusnul Yakin		(Indonesia) Thunder	ARJ	List: Front: None; Back: tehkota; Sleeves: Dolan Blora; Shorts: None
Persikama	(Indonesia) Ixsan Pranoto	(Indonesia)	(Indonesia) BNS Sport Apparel	BNS Anak Lanang	List: Front: None; Back: None; Sleeves: None; Shorts: None
Persipur	(Indonesia) Wahyu Teguh		(Indonesia) Grande	ALIB	List: Front: RWP, More Plants Landscape, Bank BKK Purwodadi, Noroyono; Back: Hajar Aswad, RBLA Digital Printing, Dina Ciputra; Sleeves: Q-Fit Studio; Shorts: None
Persitema	(Indonesia) Muhamad Yunus		(Indonesia) GTA Apparel	Perumda Air Minum Tirta Agung	List: Front: BigsGall, Appleku, SDA, Bank Temanggung, SMP Nur Lintang; Back: Cleo Pure Water; Sleeves: None; Shorts: None
PPSM	(Indonesia)		(Indonesia) 1919^{2}	Asumsi.co	List: Front: None; Back: Sakopi; Sleeves: None; Shorts: None
PSD			(Indonesia) Expert Sportswear	Charlie Hospital	List: Front: None; Back: Expert Sportswear; Sleeves: None; Shorts: None
PSIK	(Indonesia) Koco Pramono		(Indonesia) Total Sportswear	Bank Klaten	List: Front: CV Bonjor Jaya Utama, PDAM Tirta Merapi, Bagas Waras, Madani Creative; Back: PT Aneka Usaha Kabupaten Klaten; Sleeves: None; Shorts: None
PSIP	(Indonesia) Winaryo		(Indonesia) Estaft	BBM	List: Front: PT Nata Citra Marine, HRW, PT Novo Citra Marine, Abdi Alam, Shankara Interior, CV Atomic Work, PT Setya Jaya Samudra; Back: TBU Mesin, Mahandini Perkasa; Sleeves: None; Shorts: None
PSIR	(Indonesia) Yulian Syahreva		(Indonesia) Arafs Apparel	Safria	List: Front: Bank Rembang, PDAM Banyumili, BPR BKK Lasem, Bank Jateng, SLI Group, PT Sarana Bahari Nusantara Cemerlang; Back: None; Sleeves: None; Shorts: None
PSIW	(Indonesia)	(Indonesia)	(Indonesia) Grande	Orion Villa	List: Front: Back: BPR Bank Wonosobo, Perumda Air Minum Tirta Aji, Bank Jateng; Sleeves: None; Shorts: None
Revo	(Indonesia)		(Indonesia)	Revo	List: Front: Back: Sleeves: Shorts: None
Safin Pati	(Indonesia)		(Indonesia) BB Sport	None	List: Front: None; Back: None; Sleeves: None; Shorts: None
Slawi United			(Indonesia) Defender	PT Whilli Salma Beton	List: Front: Kharisma Trans; Back: Sleeves: Shorts:
Wijayakusuma	(Indonesia) Mohamad Yahya		(Indonesia) FAM Apparel	seputarbanyumas.com	List: Front: PT Arafs FAM Apparel; Back: Mistar Gawang, Tirta Wijaya; Sleeves: None; Shorts: None
Wisesa	(Indonesia)		(Indonesia) Defender	Defender	List: Front: Back: Sleeves: Shorts: None

1. Caretaker.
2. Apparel made by club.

== Group stage ==
The draw for the group stage took place on 2 December 2025 in Semarang. The 26 teams will be drawn into seven groups of three or four based on the geographical location of their homebase. Winner and runner-up of each groups along with two best third place teams will be qualified to knockout stage.

=== Group A ===
Pos	Team	Pld	W	D	L	GF	GA	GD	Pts	Qualification	PHJ	PRB	PBL	SFP
1	Persiharjo Sukoharjo	6	4	1	1	13	3	+10	13 (Note: Tied on head-to-head points. Head-to-head goal difference: Persiharjo Sukoharjo +1, PSIR Rembang –1.)	Qualification to the Knockout stage	—	3–1	1–0	3–0
2	PSIR Rembang	6	4	1	1	13	6	+7	13	Qualification to the Knockout stage	1–0	—	0–0	3–0
3	Persikaba Blora	6	2	2	2	12	6	+6	8	Qualification to the Knockout stage	1–1	2–3	—	6–0
4	Safin Pati	6	0	0	6	2	25	−23	0		0–5	1–5	1–3	—

Source: Liga 4 Central Java
Legend: Blue = home team win; Yellow = draw; Red = away team win.
Rules for classification: 1) Points; 2) Head-to-head points; 3) Head-to-head goal difference; 4) Head-to-head goals scored; 5) Goal difference; 6) Goals scored; 7) Fair-play points; 8) Draw.

=== Group B ===
Pos	Team	Pld	W	D	L	GF	GA	GD	Pts	Qualification	PDM	PKL	RVS	WFS
1	PSD Demak	6	4	2	0	15	6	+9	14	Qualification to the Knockout stage	—	1–0	1–1	2–0
2	PSIK Klaten	6	3	2	1	19	5	+14	11	Qualification to the Knockout stage	2–2	—	5–0	7–0
3	Revo	6	2	2	2	9	15	−6	8		2–6	2–2	—	3–0
4	Wisesa	6	0	0	6	2	19	−17	0		1–3	0–3	0–1	—

Source: Liga 4 Central Java
Legend: Blue = home team win; Yellow = draw; Red = away team win.
Rules for classification: 1) Points; 2) Head-to-head points; 3) Head-to-head goal difference; 4) Head-to-head goals scored; 5) Goal difference; 6) Goals scored; 7) Fair-play points; 8) Draw.

=== Group C ===
Pos	Team	Pld	W	D	L	GF	GA	GD	Pts	Qualification	PPU	PBI	MJM	BHM
1	Persipur Purwodadi	6	6	0	0	29	6	+23	18	Qualification to the Knockout stage	—	3–2	8–0	3–0
2	Persebi Boyolali	6	4	0	2	19	8	+11	12	Qualification to the Knockout stage	2–5	—	5–0	6–0
3	Mahesa Jenar Muda	6	1	0	5	5	22	−17	3 (Note: Tied on head-to-head points. Head-to-head goal difference: Mahesa Jenar Muda +2, Bhayangkara Muda –2.)		1–5	0–2	—	3–0
4	Bhayangkara Muda	6	1	0	5	3	20	−17	3		1–5	0–2	2–1	—

Source: Liga 4 Central Java
Legend: Blue = home team win; Yellow = draw; Red = away team win.
Rules for classification: 1) Points; 2) Head-to-head points; 3) Head-to-head goal difference; 4) Head-to-head goals scored; 5) Goal difference; 6) Goals scored; 7) Fair-play points; 8) Draw.

=== Group D ===
Pos	Team	Pld	W	D	L	GF	GA	GD	Pts	Qualification	PTM	SLU	PWS
1	Persitema Temanggung	4	1	3	0	4	3	+1	6	Qualification to the Knockout stage	—	2–2	1–0
2	Slawi United	4	1	2	1	5	5	0	5	Qualification to the Knockout stage	0–0	—	2–0
3	PSIW Wonosobo	4	1	1	2	4	5	−1	4		1–1	3–1	—

Source: Liga 4 Central Java
Legend: Blue = home team win; Yellow = draw; Red = away team win.
Rules for classification: 1) Points; 2) Head-to-head points; 3) Head-to-head goal difference; 4) Head-to-head goals scored; 5) Goal difference; 6) Goals scored; 7) Fair-play points; 8) Draw.

=== Group E ===
Pos	Team	Pld	W	D	L	GF	GA	GD	Pts	Qualification	PBS	PBG	PML	MGL
1	Persibas Banyumas	6	5	0	1	11	6	+5	15	Qualification to the Knockout stage	—	1–0	1–0	1–0
2	Persibangga Purbalingga	6	4	1	1	15	4	+11	13	Qualification to the Knockout stage	4–1	—	4–1	5–0
3	PSIP Pemalang	6	1	2	3	5	11	−6	5		1–4	1–1	—	1–0
4	PPSM Magelang	6	0	1	5	2	12	−10	1		1–3	0–1	1–1	—

Source: Liga 4 Central Java
Legend: Blue = home team win; Yellow = draw; Red = away team win.
Rules for classification: 1) Points; 2) Head-to-head points; 3) Head-to-head goal difference; 4) Head-to-head goals scored; 5) Goal difference; 6) Goals scored; 7) Fair-play points; 8) Draw.

=== Group F ===
Pos	Team	Pld	W	D	L	GF	GA	GD	Pts	Qualification	KBM	KDL	PMG	PBJ
1	Persak Kebumen	6	3	1	2	8	4	+4	10	Qualification to the Knockout stage	—	0–1	4–0	1–0
2	Persik Kendal	6	3	0	3	9	5	+4	9	Qualification to the Knockout stage	3–0	—	1–2	3–0
3	Persikama Magelang	6	2	2	2	6	9	−3	8	Qualification to the Knockout stage	0–0	2–1	—	1–2
4	Persibara Banjarnegara	6	2	1	3	4	9	−5	7		0–3	1–0	1–1	—

Source: Liga 4 Central Java
Legend: Blue = home team win; Yellow = draw; Red = away team win.
Rules for classification: 1) Points; 2) Head-to-head points; 3) Head-to-head goal difference; 4) Head-to-head goals scored; 5) Goal difference; 6) Goals scored; 7) Fair-play points; 8) Draw.

=== Group G ===
Pos	Team	Pld	W	D	L	GF	GA	GD	Pts	Qualification	WJK	PBT	ISP
1	Wijayakusuma	4	2	0	2	4	2	+2	6	Qualification to the Knockout stage	—	1–0	3–0
2	Persibat Batang	4	2	0	2	3	3	0	6	Qualification to the Knockout stage	1–0	—	0–1
3	ISP Purworejo	4	2	0	2	3	5	−2	6		1–0	1–2	—

Source: Liga 4 Central Java
Legend: Blue = home team win; Yellow = draw; Red = away team win.
Rules for classification: 1) Points; 2) Head-to-head points; 3) Head-to-head goal difference; 4) Head-to-head goals scored; 5) Goal difference; 6) Goals scored; 7) Fair-play points; 8) Draw.

=== Ranking of third placed teams ===
Pos	Grp	Team	Pld	W	D	L	GF	GA	GD	Pts	Qualification
1	A	Persikaba Blora	6	2	2	2	12	6	+6	8	Qualification to the Knockout stage
2	F	Persikama Magelang	6	2	2	2	6	9	−3	8	Qualification to the Knockout stage
3	B	Revo	6	2	2	2	9	15	−6	8	
4	E	PSIP Pemalang	6	1	2	3	5	11	−6	5	
5	C	Mahesa Jenar Muda	6	1	0	5	5	22	−17	3	

Source: Liga 4 Central Java
Rules for classification: Rules for classification: 1) Points; 2) Goal difference; 3) Goals scored ; 4) Fair-play points; 5) Draw.

== Knockout stage ==
Each tie in the knockout stage, apart from the final, is played over two legs, with each team playing one leg at home. The team that scores more goals on aggregate over the two legs advances to the next round (the away goals rule is not applied). If the aggregate score is level, the winners are decided by a penalty shoot-out. In the final, which is played as a single match, if the score is level at the end of normal time, a penalty shoot-out is played.

=== Bracket ===
Round of 16
A1	Persiharjo Sukoharjo	1	2	3
F3	Persikama Magelang	1	1	2
B1	PSD Demak (p)	0	2	3 (3)
G2	Persibat Batang	1	1	3 (0)
C1	Persipur Purwodadi	0	0	0
F2	Persik Kendal	2	1	3
D1	Persitema Temanggung	0	0	0
E2	Persibangga Purbalingga	1	0	1
E1	Persibas Banyumas	1	5	6
A3	Persikaba Blora	1	0	1
F1	Persak Kebumen	0	3	3
D2	Slawi United	1	1	2
G1	Wijayakusuma	0	0	0
C2	Persebi Boyolali	2	0	2
A2	PSIR Rembang (p)	0	3	3 (4)
B2	PSIK Klaten	2	1	3 (3)

Quarter-finals
Persiharjo Sukoharjo	1	2	3
PSD Demak	0	1	1
Persik Kendal	0	0	0
Persibangga Purbalingga	1	1	2
Persibas Banyumas	0	0	0
Persak Kebumen	1	1	2
Persebi Boyolali	1	0	1
PSIR Rembang	2	1	3

Semi-finals
Persiharjo Sukoharjo	2	0	2 (4)
Persibangga Purbalingga	1	1	2 (5)
Persak Kebumen	1	2	3
PSIR Rembang	1	0	1

Final
Persibangga Purbalingga	1 (12)
Persak Kebumen	1 (11)

=== Round of 16 ===
==== Summary ====
Team 1	Agg.	Team 2	1st leg	2nd leg
Persiharjo Sukoharjo	3–2	Persikama Magelang	1–1	2–1
PSD Demak	3–3 (3–0 p)	Persibat Batang	0–1	2–1
Persipur Purwodadi	0–3	Persik Kendal	0–2	0–1
Persitema Temanggung	0–1	Persibangga Purbalingga	0–1	0–0
Persibas Banyumas	6–1	Persikaba Blora	1–1	5–0
Persak Kebumen	3–2	Slawi United	0–1	3–1
Wijayakusuma	0–2	Persebi Boyolali	0–2	0–0
PSIR Rembang	3–3 (4–3 p)	PSIK Klaten	0–2	3–1

==== Matches ====
First leg

25 January 2026	Persikama Magelang	1–1	Persiharjo Sukoharjo	Magelang
15:00 UTC+7				Stadium: Amerta Stadium

25 January 2026	Persibat Batang	1–0	PSD Demak	Batang
15:00 UTC+7				Stadium: Moh Sarengat Stadium

25 January 2026	Persik Kendal	2–0	Persipur Purwodadi	Kendal
15:00 UTC+7				Stadium: Kebondalem Stadium

25 January 2026	Persibangga Purbalingga	1–0	Persitema Temanggung	Purbalingga
15:00 UTC+7				Stadium: Goentoer Darjono Stadium

25 January 2026	Persikaba Blora	1–1	Persibas Banyumas	Blora
15:00 UTC+7				Stadium: Kridaloka Stadium

25 January 2026	Slawi United	1–0	Persak Kebumen	Tegal
15:00 UTC+7				Stadium: Trisanja Stadium

25 January 2026	Persebi Boyolali	2–0	Wijayakusuma	Boyolali
15:00 UTC+7				Stadium: Kebogiro Stadium

25 January 2026	PSIK Klaten	2–0	PSIR Rembang	Klaten
15:00 UTC+7				Stadium: Trikoyo Stadium

Second leg

28 January 2026	Persiharjo Sukoharjo	2–1 (3–2 agg.)	Persikama Magelang	Sukoharjo
15:00 UTC+7				Stadium: Gelora Merdeka Stadium

28 January 2026	PSD Demak	2–1 (3–3 (3–0 p) agg.) (3–0 p)	Persibat Batang	Demak
15:00 UTC+7				Stadium: Sultan Fatah Stadium

28 January 2026	Persipur Purwodadi	0–1 (0–3 agg.)	Persik Kendal	Grobogan
15:00 UTC+7				Stadium: Krida Bakti Stadium

28 January 2026	Persitema Temanggung	0–0 (0–1 agg.)	Persibangga Purbalingga	Temanggung
15:00 UTC+7				Stadium: Bhumi Phala Stadium

28 January 2026	Persibas Banyumas	5–0 (6–1 agg.)	Persikaba Blora	Banyumas
15:00 UTC+7				Stadium: Satria Stadium

28 January 2026	Persak Kebumen	3–1 (3–2 agg.)	Slawi United	Purworejo
15:00 UTC+7				Stadium: Sarwo Edhie Wibowo Stadium

28 January 2026	Wijayakusuma	0–0 (0–2 agg.)	Persebi Boyolali	Cilacap
15:00 UTC+7				Stadium: Wijayakusuma Stadium

28 January 2026	PSIR Rembang	3–1 (3–3 (4–3 p) agg.)	PSIK Klaten	Rembang
15:00 UTC+7				Stadium: Krida Stadium

=== Quarter-finals ===
==== Summary ====
Team 1	Agg.	Team 2	1st leg	2nd leg
Persiharjo Sukoharjo	3–1	PSD Demak	1–0	2–1
Persik Kendal	0–2	Persibangga Purbalingga	0–1	0–1
Persibas Banyumas	0–2	Persak Kebumen	0–1	0–1
Persebi Boyolali	1–3	PSIR Rembang	1–2	0–1

=== Semi-finals ===
==== Summary ====
Team 1	Agg.	Team 2	1st leg	2nd leg
Persiharjo Sukoharjo	2–2 (4–5 p)	Persibangga Purbalingga	2–1	0–1
Persak Kebumen	3–1	PSIR Rembang	1–1	2–0

=== Final ===
16 February 2026
15:00 WIB (UTC+7)

Persak Kebumen	1–1 (a.e.t.)	Persibangga Purbalingga
Penalties
	11–12

Jatidiri Stadium, Semarang

== See also ==
- 2025–26 Liga 4
