= 2021 Liga 3 Central Java =

Tournament details
- Dates: 31 October–1 December 2021
- Teams: 26

Final positions
- Champions: Persipa Pati (1st title)
- Runners-up: Persebi Boyolali
- Third place: Persak Kebumen
- Fourth place: PSIP Pemalang

The 2021 Liga 3 Central Java (also known as Liga 3 MS Glow For Men PSSI Jawa Tengah for sponsorship reason) will be the sixth season of Liga 3 Central Java as a qualifying round for the national round of the 2021–22 Liga 3.

Persiku Kudus were the defending champion.

== Teams ==
There are 26 teams participated in the league this season.

Team	Location
BJL 2000	Semarang
PS Ebod Jaya Kebumen	Kebumen Regency
ISP Purworejo	Purworejo Regency
Persab Brebes	Brebes Regency
Persak Kebumen	Kebumen Regency
Persebi Boyolali	Boyolali Regency
Persekap Pekalongan	Pekalongan Regency
Persibas Banyumas	Banyumas Regency
Persibat Batang	Batang Regency
Persik Kendal	Kendal Regency
Persika Karanganyar	Karanganyar Regency
Persikaba Blora	Blora Regency
Persikama Magelang	Magelang Regency
Persiku Kudus	Kudus Regency
Persip Pekalongan	Pekalongan
Persipa Pati	Pati Regency
Persipur Purwodadi	Grobogan Regency
Persitema Temanggung	Temanggung Regency
PSD Demak	Demak Regency
PSDB United	Demak Regency
PSIP Pemalang	Pemalang Regency
PSIR Rembang	Rembang Regency
PSISa Salatiga	Salatiga
PSIW Wonosobo	Wonosobo Regency
PPSM Magelang	Magelang
Slawi United	Tegal Regency

== Venues ==
- Group A: Mochtar Stadium, Pemalang
- Group B: Hoegeng Stadium, Pekalongan
- Group C: Kebondalem Stadium, Kendal
- Group D: Moch. Soebroto Stadium, Magelang
- Group E: Bhumi Phala Stadium, Temanggung

== First round ==
=== Group A ===
Pos	Team	Pld	W	D	L	GF	GA	GD	Pts	Qualification
1	PSIP (H)	4	3	1	0	8	2	+6	10	Advanced to Second round
2	Persekap	4	2	2	0	7	2	+5	8	Advanced to Second round
3	BJL 2000	4	1	1	2	3	7	−4	4	
4	Persikaba	4	1	1	2	2	6	−4	4	
5	Persiku	4	0	1	3	5	8	−3	1	

Source: Liga 3 2021 Jateng
(H) Hosts

=== Group B ===
Pos	Team	Pld	W	D	L	GF	GA	GD	Pts	Qualification
1	Persipa	4	3	1	0	8	1	+7	10	Advanced to Second round
2	Persip (H)	4	2	2	0	5	3	+2	8	Advanced to Second round
3	Persab	4	2	1	1	5	2	+3	7	
4	PSD	4	0	1	3	2	7	−5	1	
5	Slawi United	4	0	1	3	1	8	−7	1	

Source: Liga 3 2021 Jateng
(H) Hosts

=== Group C ===
Pos	Team	Pld	W	D	L	GF	GA	GD	Pts	Qualification
1	Persibat	4	2	2	0	5	3	+2	8	Advanced to Second round
2	PSIR	4	2	1	1	7	1	+6	7	Advanced to Second round
3	Persik (H)	4	2	1	1	9	4	+5	7	
4	PSDB United	4	2	0	2	6	4	+2	6	
5	Persipur	4	0	0	4	3	18	−15	0	

Source: Liga 3 2021 Jateng
(H) Hosts

=== Group D ===
Pos	Team	Pld	W	D	L	GF	GA	GD	Pts	Qualification
1	Persak	5	3	2	0	8	2	+6	11	Advanced to Second round
2	Persika	5	2	3	0	9	6	+3	9	Advanced to Second round
3	Persibas	5	3	0	2	11	7	+4	9	
4	PSIW	5	1	3	1	8	9	−1	6	
5	PPSM (H)	5	1	1	3	7	12	−5	4	
6	ISP	5	0	1	4	4	11	−7	1	

Source: Liga 3 2021 Jateng
(H) Hosts

=== Group E ===
Pos	Team	Pld	W	D	L	GF	GA	GD	Pts	Qualification
1	Persebi	4	4	0	0	7	2	+5	12	Advanced to Second round
2	PSISa	4	2	1	1	4	3	+1	7	Advanced to Second round
3	Persitema (H)	4	1	1	2	3	5	−2	4	
4	Persikama	4	1	1	2	4	5	−1	4	
5	PS Ebod Jaya Kebumen	4	0	1	3	1	4	−3	1	

Source: Liga 3 2021 Jateng
(H) Hosts

== Second round ==
=== Group F ===
Pos	Team	Pld	W	D	L	GF	GA	GD	Pts	Qualification
1	PSIP	4	2	1	1	6	5	+1	7	Advanced to Semifinal
2	Persak	4	2	1	1	7	6	+1	7	Advanced to Semifinal
3	PSIR	4	2	0	2	5	4	+1	6	
4	PSISa	4	1	1	2	3	4	−1	4	
5	Persika	4	1	1	2	3	5	−2	4	

Source: Liga 3 2021 Jateng

=== Group G ===
Pos	Team	Pld	W	D	L	GF	GA	GD	Pts	Qualification
1	Persebi	4	4	0	0	13	6	+7	12	Advanced to Semifinal
2	Persipa	4	3	0	1	8	5	+3	9	Advanced to Semifinal
3	Persekap	4	1	1	2	5	5	0	4	
4	Persip	4	1	1	2	5	6	−1	4	
5	Persibat	4	0	0	4	3	12	−9	0	

Source: Liga 3 Jawa Tengah

== Knockout stage ==
=== Semifinals ===
December 7, 2021
14.00 UTC+7

PSIP	2–2 Penalties: 1–4	Persipa

December 8, 2021
14.00 UTC+7

Persebi	2–1	Persak

=== Third place ===
December 13, 2021
14.30 UTC+7

PSIP	1–2	Persak

=== Finals ===
December 13, 2021
14.30 UTC+7

Persipa	5–0	Persebi
