= 2024–25 Liga 4 Central Java =

Liga 4 Central Java
- Season: 2024–25
- Dates: 4 January – 27 February 2025
- Champions: Persebi (1st title)
- National phase: Persebi; Persika Karanganyar; Persibat; Persip
- Matches: 103
- Goals: 271 (2.63 per match)
- Biggest home win: Persika Karanganyar 7–0 PSIR (5 February 2025)
- Biggest away win: Persik Kendal 1–5 Slawi United (29 January 2025)
- Highest scoring: Persipur 4–3 PSIR (15 January 2025); Persika Karanganyar 7–0 PSIR (5 February 2025)

The 2024–25 Liga 4 Central Java was the inaugural season of Liga 4 Central Java after the structural changes of Indonesian football competition and serves as a qualifying round for the national phase of the 2024–25 Liga 4. The competition is organised by the Central Java Provincial PSSI Association.

Persip are the two-time defending champion.

== Teams ==
A total of 18 teams are competing in this season.

=== Teams changes ===
The following teams changed division after the 2023–24 season.

▲ Promoted to Liga 2
- Persiku

=== Locations and stadiums ===
No	Team	Location	Stadium	Capacity	2023 season
1	Persab	Brebes Regency	Karangbirahi	10,000	Quarter-finalist
2	Slawi United	Tegal Regency	Tri Sanja	10,000	—
3	Bintang Timur	Pekalongan Regency	Kosambi	0	—
4	Persibat	Batang Regency	Moh Sarengat	15,000	—
5	Persik Kendal	Kendal Regency	Kebondalem	15,000	Second round (3rd in Group G)
6	PSD	Demak Regency	Sultan Fatah	1,500	—
7	Persip	Pekalongan City	Hoegeng	20,000	Champions
8	Persak	Kebumen Regency	Chandradimuka	10,000	—
9	Wijaya Kusuma	Cilacap Regency	Wijayakusuma	10,000	—
10	PSIW	Wonosobo Regency	Tanggulasi	0	Quarter-finalist
11	Persitema	Temanggung Regency	Bhumi Phala	7,000	—
12	Persikama	Magelang Regency	Gemilang	15,000	—
13	PPSM	Magelang City	Moch. Soebroto	30,000	First round (3rd in Group F)
14	Persipur	Grobogan Regency	Krida Bhakti	12,000	First round (4th in Group C)
15	Persebi	Boyolali Regency	Kebo Giro	12,000	—
16	Persiharjo	Sukoharjo Regency	Gelora Merdeka Jombor	10,000	—
17	Persika Karanganyar	Karanganyar Regency	Angkatan 45	2,000	First round (3rd in Group C)
18	PSIR	Rembang Regency	Krida	10,000	First round (3rd in Group D)

=== Personnel and kits ===
Note: Flags indicate national team as has been defined under FIFA eligibility rules. Players and coaches may hold more than one non-FIFA nationality.

Team	Head coach	Captain	Kit manufacturer	Main kit sponsor	Other kit sponsor(s)
Bintang Timur	(Indonesia) Achmad Yasin		(Indonesia) Made by club	Infra Sport & Corporation (Matchweeks 1 & 2) / Koncone Dede (Matchweek 3 onwards)	List: Front: Back: Sleeves: Shorts:
Persab	(Indonesia) Sendi Oktavian		(Indonesia) BSport	Bintang Indokarya Gemilang	List: Front: Surya Karima Abadi; Back: None; Sleeves: None; Shorts: None
Persak	(Indonesia) Mohammad Irfan		(Indonesia) Fortwear	SKN Group	List: Front: Karya Adi, Tradha Group, Suara Muda; Back: Fortwear; Sleeves: Malindo Corner, Yun’s Accessories; Shorts: None
Persebi	(Indonesia) Doel Khamid	(Indonesia) Joko Sasongko	(Indonesia) Oliver	None	List: Front: None; Back: None; Sleeves: None; Shorts: None
Persibat	(Indonesia) Imral Usman	(Indonesia) Nanda	(Indonesia) Estaft	None	List: Front: None; Back: None; Sleeves: None; Shorts: None
Persiharjo	(Indonesia) Arif Budi Sulistyo		(Indonesia) JR Sport	Social Justice	List: Front: Headwell Hair Studio; Back: Samba Persada; Sleeves: None; Shorts: None
Persik Kendal	(Indonesia) Mahadi	(Indonesia) Untung Riyadi	(Indonesia) Ezla	None	List: Front: None; Back: Ezla; Sleeves: Rumah Makan Padang Sinar Boja; Shorts: None
Persika Karanganyar	(Indonesia) Slamet Riadi		(Indonesia) Amrta	None	List: Front: None; Back: None; Sleeves: None; Shorts: None
Persikama	(Indonesia) Edy Prayitno	(Indonesia) Rino	(Indonesia) Svein	None	List: Front: None; Back: None; Sleeves: None; Shorts: None
Persip	(Indonesia) Mochammad Hasan		(Indonesia) Giggsy	Bank Pekalongan	List: Front: Pieter Jackson; Back: Kospin Jasa, Bank Jateng; Sleeves: Perumda Tirtayasa Kota Pekalongan; Shorts: None
Persipur		(Indonesia) Susanto	(Indonesia) Amrta	RBLA Digital Printing	List: Front: Semen Grobogan; Back: Bank Jateng; Sleeves: PT Amerta Gama Nusantara; Shorts: None
Persitema	(Indonesia) Eko Riyadi	(Indonesia) Awank Agus	(Indonesia) PGRPN	BigsGall	List: Front: SDA; Back: PT Haniori; Sleeves: Appleku; Shorts: None
PPSM	(Indonesia) Gatot Barnowo	(Indonesia) Denny Agus	(Indonesia) NTHM	Asumsi.co	List: Front: None; Back: Sakopi; Sleeves: None; Shorts: None
PSD			(Indonesia) Expert Sportswear	Charlie Hospital	List: Front: None; Back: Expert Sportswear; Sleeves: None; Shorts: None
PSIR	(Indonesia) Hariyanto	(Indonesia) Efendi	(Indonesia) Arafs Apparel	PT Safria Irfana Putra (1st half) / Semen Gresik (2nd half)	List: Front: SLI Group, Bank Jateng (2nd half), PT Safria Irfana Putra (2nd half); Back: Hengxuan, Harmusa Oktaviani, SBR, BPR BKK, Selecta Grafika, Bank BRI, PDAM Banyu Mili, BPR Dhana Mitratama, Badra Group, Arafs Apparel; Sleeves: None; Shorts: None
PSIW	(Indonesia) Hafizh Fajri	(Indonesia) Syaiful	(Indonesia) Grande	Wonosobo	List: Front: Wonosobo Regency Government; Back: None; Sleeves: None; Shorts: None
Slawi United			(Indonesia) Defender	RCB	List: Front: Kharisma Trans; Back: Sleeves: Shorts:
Wijaya Kusuma	(Indonesia) Mohamad Yahya		(Indonesia) Arafs Apparel	Arafs Apparel	List: Front: None; Back: None; Sleeves: None; Shorts: None

== Schedule ==
The schedule of the competition is as follows.

Round	Matchday	First leg	Second leg
preliminary round	Matchday 1	4–5 January 2025	
preliminary round	Matchday 2	8 January 2025	
preliminary round	Matchday 3	12 January 2025	
preliminary round	Matchday 4	15 January 2025	
preliminary round	Matchday 5	19 January 2025	
preliminary round	Matchday 6	22 January 2025	
preliminary round	Matchday 7	26 January 2025	
preliminary round	Matchday 8	29 January 2025	
preliminary round	Matchday 9	2 February 2025	
preliminary round	Matchday 10	5 February 2025	
Knockout round	Quarter-finals	12 February 2025	16 February 2025
Knockout round	Semi-finals	21 February 2025	24 February 2025
Knockout round	Final	27 February 2025 in Semarang	

== Preliminary round ==
The draw for the preliminary round took place on 24 December 2024 in Semarang. The 18 teams will be drawn into 3 groups of six. The preliminary round will be played in home-and-away round-robin matches.

The winners and runners-up from each group along with two best third-placed teams will be advance to the knockout round.

=== Group A ===
Pos	Team	Pld	W	D	L	GF	GA	GD	Pts	Qualification	BAT	SAB	PSD	SLU	BIN	KDL
1	Persibat	10	6	3	1	21	8	+13	21	Qualification to the knockout round	—	2–0	3–2	2–0	3–0	1–1
2	Persab	10	5	4	1	12	4	+8	19 (Note: Ranked on head-to-head points: Persab 4, PSD 1.)	Qualification to the knockout round	0–0	—	1–0	1–0	2–0	3–0
3	PSD	10	6	1	3	16	9	+7	19	Qualification to the knockout round	2–1	0–0	—	1–0	4–0	2–0
4	Slawi United	10	4	3	3	15	9	+6	15		2–2	1–1	2–1	—	3–0	2–0
5	Bintang Timur	10	1	2	7	5	22	−17	5		1–4	0–3	1–2	0–0	—	2–0
6	Persik Kendal	10	0	3	7	5	22	−17	3		0–3	1–1	1–2	1–5	1–1	—

Source: Liga 4 Central Java
Rules for classification: 1) Points; 2) Head-to-head points; 3) Head-to-head goal difference; 4) Head-to-head goals scored; 5) Goal difference; 6) Goals scored; 7) Fair-play points; 8) Draw.

==== Group A Matches ====
Matchday 1 (4–5 January 2025)
4 January 2025
15:15 WIB (UTC+7)

Persibat	2–0	Persab
	Report

Moh Sarengat Stadium, Batang
4 January 2025
15:15 WIB (UTC+7)

Bintang Timur	0–0	Slawi United
	Report

Kosambi Mini Stadium, Pekalongan
5 January 2025
15:15 WIB (UTC+7)

Persik Kendal	1–2	PSD
	Report

Kebondalem Stadium, Kendal

Matchday 2 (8 January 2025)
8 January 2025
15:15 WIB (UTC+7)

Slawi United	2–0	Persik Kendal
	Report

Tri Sanja Stadium, Tegal
8 January 2025
15:15 WIB (UTC+7)

Persibat	3–0	Bintang Timur
	Report

Moh Sarengat Stadium, Batang
8 January 2025
15:15 WIB (UTC+7)

PSD	0–0	Persab
	Report

Sultan Fatah Stadium, Demak

Matchday 3 (12 January 2025)
12 January 2025
15:15 WIB (UTC+7)

Persab	1–0	Slawi United
	Report

Karangbirahi Stadium, Brebes
12 January 2025
15:15 WIB (UTC+7)

PSD	2–1	Persibat
	Report

Sultan Fatah Stadium, Demak
12 January 2025
15:15 WIB (UTC+7)

Persik Kendal	1–1	Bintang Timur
	Report

Kebondalem Stadium, Kendal

Matchday 4 (15 January 2025)
15 January 2025
15:15 WIB (UTC+7)

Slawi United	2–2	Persibat
	Report

Tri Sanja Stadium, Tegal
15 January 2025
15:15 WIB (UTC+7)

Persab	3–0	Persik Kendal
	Report

Karangbirahi Stadium, Brebes
15 January 2025
15:15 WIB (UTC+7)

PSD	4–0	Bintang Timur
	Report

Sultan Fatah Stadium, Demak

Matchday 5 (19 January 2025)
19 January 2025
15:15 WIB (UTC+7)

Slawi United	2–1	PSD
	Report

Tri Sanja Stadium, Tegal
19 January 2025
15:15 WIB (UTC+7)

Bintang Timur	0–3	Persab
	Report

Kosambi Mini Stadium, Pekalongan
19 January 2025
15:15 WIB (UTC+7)

Persibat	1–1	Persik Kendal
	Report

Moh Sarengat Stadium, Batang

Matchday 6 (22 January 2025)
22 January 2025
15:15 WIB (UTC+7)

Persibat	2–0	Slawi United
	Report

Moh Sarengat Stadium, Batang
22 January 2025
15:15 WIB (UTC+7)

Persik Kendal	1–1	Persab
	Report

Kebondalem Stadium, Kendal
22 January 2025
15:15 WIB (UTC+7)

Bintang Timur	1–2	PSD
	Report

Kosambi Mini Stadium, Pekalongan

Matchday 7 (26 January 2025)
26 January 2025
15:15 WIB (UTC+7)

Persab	0–0	Persibat
	Report

Karangbirahi Stadium, Brebes
26 January 2025
15:15 WIB (UTC+7)

PSD	2–0	Persik Kendal
	Report

Sultan Fatah Stadium, Demak
26 January 2025
15:15 WIB (UTC+7)

Slawi United	3–0	Bintang Timur
	Report

Tri Sanja Stadium, Tegal

Matchday 8 (29 January 2025)
29 January 2025
15:15 WIB (UTC+7)

Persik Kendal	1–5	Slawi United
	Report

Kebondalem Stadium, Kendal
29 January 2025
15:15 WIB (UTC+7)

Bintang Timur	1–4	Persibat
	Report

Kosambi Mini Stadium, Pekalongan
29 January 2025
15:15 WIB (UTC+7)

Persab	1–0	PSD
	Report

Karangbirahi Stadium, Brebes

Matchday 9 (2 February 2025)
2 February 2025
15:15 WIB (UTC+7)

Slawi United	1–1	Persab
	Report

Tri Sanja Stadium, Tegal
2 February 2025
15:15 WIB (UTC+7)

Persibat	3–2	PSD
	Report

Moh Sarengat Stadium, Batang
2 February 2025
15:15 WIB (UTC+7)

Bintang Timur	2–0	Persik Kendal
	Report

Kosambi Mini Stadium, Pekalongan

Matchday 10 (5 February 2025)
5 February 2025
15:15 WIB (UTC+7)

PSD	1–0	Slawi United
	Report

Sultan Fatah Stadium, Demak
5 February 2025
15:15 WIB (UTC+7)

Persab	2–0	Bintang Timur
	Report

Karangbirahi Stadium, Brebes
5 February 2025
15:15 WIB (UTC+7)

Persik Kendal	0–3	Persibat
	Report

Kebondalem Stadium, Kendal

=== Group B ===
Pos	Team	Pld	W	D	L	GF	GA	GD	Pts	Qualification	PBI	PKA	MGL	PUR	PHJ	RBG
1	Persebi	10	7	2	1	14	5	+9	23	Qualification to the knockout round	—	2–1	2–0	1–0	1–0	2–1
2	Persika Karanganyar	10	7	1	2	22	5	+17	22	Qualification to the knockout round	1–0	—	1–1	2–0	1–0	7–0
3	PPSM	10	4	3	3	16	12	+4	15	Qualification to the knockout round	0–0	0–2	—	3–1	3–0	4–0
4	Persipur	10	4	1	5	12	18	−6	13		1–3	0–3	2–2	—	1–0	4–3
5	Persiharjo	10	3	1	6	6	12	−6	10		0–0	2–1	2–0	0–1	—	2–1
6	PSIR	10	1	0	9	12	30	−18	3		1–3	0–3	2–3	1–2	3–0	—

Source: Liga 4 Central Java
Rules for classification: 1) Points; 2) Head-to-head points; 3) Head-to-head goal difference; 4) Head-to-head goals scored; 5) Goal difference; 6) Goals scored; 7) Fair-play points; 8) Draw.

==== Group B Matches ====
Matchday 1 (4 January 2025)
4 January 2025
15:15 WIB (UTC+7)

Persiharjo	0–0	Persebi
	Report

Gelora Merdeka Jombor Stadium, Sukoharjo
4 January 2025
15:15 WIB (UTC+7)

Persika Karanganyar	2–0	Persipur
	Report

Angkatan 45 Stadium, Karanganyar
4 January 2025
15:15 WIB (UTC+7)

PSIR	2–3	PPSM
	Report

Krida Stadium, Rembang

Matchday 2 (8 January 2025)
8 January 2025
15:15 WIB (UTC+7)

Persebi	2–1	Persika Karanganyar
	Report

Kebo Giro Stadium, Boyolali
8 January 2025
15:15 WIB (UTC+7)

Persipur	2–2	PPSM
	Report

Krida Bakti Stadium, Grobogan
8 January 2025
15:15 WIB (UTC+7)

PSIR	3–0	Persiharjo
	Report

Krida Stadium, Rembang

Matchday 3 (12 January 2025)
12 January 2025
15:15 WIB (UTC+7)

Persiharjo	0–1	Persipur
	Report

Gelora Merdeka Jombor Stadium, Sukoharjo
12 January 2025
15:15 WIB (UTC+7)

Persebi	2–1	PSIR
	Report

Kebo Giro Stadium, Boyolali
12 January 2025
15:15 WIB (UTC+7)

PPSM	0–2	Persika Karanganyar
	Report

Moch. Soebroto Stadium, Magelang

Matchday 4 (15 January 2025)
15 January 2025
15:15 WIB (UTC+7)

Persika Karanganyar	1–0	Persiharjo
	Report

Angkatan 45 Stadium, Karanganyar
15 January 2025
15:15 WIB (UTC+7)

PPSM	0–0	Persebi
	Report

Moch. Soebroto Stadium, Magelang
15 January 2025
15:15 WIB (UTC+7)

Persipur	4–3	PSIR
	Report

Krida Bakti Stadium, Grobogan

Matchday 5 (19 January 2025)
19 January 2025
15:15 WIB (UTC+7)

Persiharjo	2–0	PPSM
	Report

Gelora Merdeka Jombor Stadium, Sukoharjo
19 January 2025
15:15 WIB (UTC+7)

PSIR	0–3	Persika Karanganyar
	Report

Krida Stadium, Rembang
19 January 2025
15:15 WIB (UTC+7)

Persebi	1–0	Persipur
	Report

Kebo Giro Stadium, Boyolali

Matchday 6 (22 January 2025)
22 January 2025
15:15 WIB (UTC+7)

Persebi	1–0	Persiharjo
	Report

Kebo Giro Stadium, Boyolali
22 January 2025
15:15 WIB (UTC+7)

Persipur	0–3	Persika Karanganyar
	Report

Krida Bakti Stadium, Grobogan
22 January 2025
15:15 WIB (UTC+7)

PPSM	4–0	PSIR
	Report

Moch. Soebroto Stadium, Magelang

Matchday 7 (26 January 2025)
26 January 2025
15:15 WIB (UTC+7)

Persika Karanganyar	1–0	Persebi
	Report

Angkatan 45 Stadium, Karanganyar
26 January 2025
15:15 WIB (UTC+7)

PPSM	3–1	Persipur
	Report

Moch. Soebroto Stadium, Magelang
26 January 2025
15:15 WIB (UTC+7)

Persiharjo	2–1	PSIR
	Report

Gelora Merdeka Jombor Stadium, Sukoharjo

Matchday 8 (29 January 2025)
29 January 2025
15:15 WIB (UTC+7)

Persipur	1–0	Persiharjo
	Report

Krida Bakti Stadium, Grobogan
29 January 2025
15:15 WIB (UTC+7)

PSIR	1–3	Persebi
	Report

Krida Stadium, Rembang
29 January 2025
15:15 WIB (UTC+7)

Persika Karanganyar	1–1	PPSM
	Report

Angkatan 45 Stadium, Karanganyar

Matchday 9 (2 February 2025)
2 February 2025
15:15 WIB (UTC+7)

Persiharjo	2–1	Persika Karanganyar
	Report

Gelora Merdeka Jombor Stadium, Sukoharjo
2 February 2025
15:15 WIB (UTC+7)

Persebi	2–0	PPSM
	Report

Kebo Giro Stadium, Boyolali
2 February 2025
15:15 WIB (UTC+7)

PSIR	1–2	Persipur
	Report

Krida Stadium, Rembang

Matchday 10 (5 February 2025)
5 February 2025
15:15 WIB (UTC+7)

PPSM	3–0	Persiharjo
	Report

Moch. Soebroto Stadium, Magelang
5 February 2025
15:15 WIB (UTC+7)

Persika Karanganyar	7–0	PSIR
	Report

Angkatan 45 Stadium, Karanganyar
5 February 2025
15:15 WIB (UTC+7)

Persipur	1–3	Persebi

Krida Bakti Stadium, Grobogan

=== Group C ===
Pos	Team	Pld	W	D	L	GF	GA	GD	Pts	Qualification	SAK	PSP	WON	TMA	KMA	WJK
1	Persak	10	6	2	2	19	9	+10	20	Qualification to the knockout round	—	2–0	3–1	3–0	3–0	3–2
2	Persip	10	6	0	4	16	10	+6	18	Qualification to the knockout round	1–0	—	3–0	5–0	1–0	1–0
3	PSIW	10	4	2	4	15	16	−1	14		2–1	3–1	—	1–1	3–1	3–0 (Note: The Central Java PSSI disciplinary committee awarded PSIW a 3–0 victory after Wijaya Kusuma refused to continue, forcing the match to be halted in the 69th minute.)
4	Persitema	10	2	5	3	6	13	−7	11		0–0	1–0	1–1	—	1–1	1–0
5	Persikama	10	2	4	4	15	15	0	10		2–2	1–2	3–1	1–1	—	5–0
6	Wijaya Kusuma (Note: Wijaya Kusuma was deducted three points by the Central Java PSSI disciplinary committee.)	10	3	1	6	10	18	−8	7		1–2	3–2	2–0	1–0	1–1	—

Source: Liga 4 Central Java
Rules for classification: 1) Points; 2) Head-to-head points; 3) Head-to-head goal difference; 4) Head-to-head goals scored; 5) Goal difference; 6) Goals scored; 7) Fair-play points; 8) Draw.

==== Group C Matches ====
Matchday 1 (4 January 2025)
4 January 2025
15:15 WIB (UTC+7)

Persip	1–0	Persikama
	Report

Hoegeng Stadium, Pekalongan
4 January 2025
15:15 WIB (UTC+7)

Persitema	1–0	Wijaya Kusuma
	Report

Bhumi Phala Stadium, Temanggung
4 January 2025
15:15 WIB (UTC+7)

Persak	3–1	PSIW
	Report

Chandradimuka Stadium, Kebumen

Matchday 2 (8 January 2025)
8 January 2025
15:15 WIB (UTC+7)

Persikama	1–1	Persitema
	Report

Gemilang Stadium, Magelang
8 January 2025
15:15 WIB (UTC+7)

Wijaya Kusuma	2–0	PSIW
	Report

Wijayakusuma Stadium, Cilacap
8 January 2025
15:15 WIB (UTC+7)

Persak	2–0	Persip
	Report

Chandradimuka Stadium, Kebumen

Matchday 3 (12 January 2025)
12 January 2025
15:15 WIB (UTC+7)

Persip	1–0	Wijaya Kusuma
	Report

Hoegeng Stadium, Pekalongan
12 January 2025
15:15 WIB (UTC+7)

Persikama	2–2	Persak
	Report

Gemilang Stadium, Magelang
12 January 2025
15:15 WIB (UTC+7)

PSIW	1–1	Persitema
	Report

Tanggulasi Field, Wonosobo

Matchday 4 (15 January 2025)
15 January 2025
15:15 WIB (UTC+7)

Persitema	1–0	Persip
	Report

Bhumi Phala Stadium, Temanggung
15 January 2025
15:15 WIB (UTC+7)

PSIW	3–1	Persikama
	Report

Tanggulasi Field, Wonosobo
15 January 2025
15:15 WIB (UTC+7)

Wijaya Kusuma	1–2	Persak
	Report

Wijayakusuma Stadium, Cilacap

Matchday 5 (19 January 2025)
19 January 2025
15:15 WIB (UTC+7)

Persip	3–0	PSIW
	Report

Hoegeng Stadium, Pekalongan
19 January 2025
15:15 WIB (UTC+7)

Persak	3–0	Persitema
	Report

Wijayakusuma Stadium, Cilacap
19 January 2025
15:15 WIB (UTC+7)

Persikama	5–0	Wijaya Kusuma
	Report

Gemilang Stadium, Magelang

Matchday 6 (22 January 2025)
22 January 2025
15:15 WIB (UTC+7)

Persikama	1–2	Persip
	Report

Gemilang Stadium, Magelang
22 January 2025
15:15 WIB (UTC+7)

Wijaya Kusuma	1–0	Persitema
	Report

Wijayakusuma Stadium, Cilacap
22 January 2025
15:15 WIB (UTC+7)

PSIW	2–1	Persak
	Report

Tanggulasi Field, Wonosobo

Matchday 7 (26 January 2025)
26 January 2025
15:15 WIB (UTC+7)

Persitema	1–1	Persikama
	Report

Bhumi Phala Stadium, Temanggung
26 January 2025
15:15 WIB (UTC+7)

PSIW	3–0 Awarded (Note: The Central Java PSSI disciplinary committee awarded PSIW a 3–0 victory after Wijaya Kusuma refused to continue, forcing the match to be halted in the 69th minute.)	Wijaya Kusuma
	Report

Tanggulasi Field, Wonosobo
26 January 2025
15:15 WIB (UTC+7)

Persip	1–0	Persak
	Report

Hoegeng Stadium, Pekalongan

Matchday 8 (29 January 2025)
29 January 2025
15:15 WIB (UTC+7)

Wijaya Kusuma	3–2	Persip
	Report

Wijayakusuma Stadium, Cilacap
29 January 2025
15:15 WIB (UTC+7)

Persak	3–0	Persikama
	Report

Rukun Jaya Stadium, Kebumen
29 January 2025
15:15 WIB (UTC+7)

Persitema	1–1	PSIW
	Report

Bhumi Phala Stadium, Temanggung

Matchday 9 (2 February 2025)
2 February 2025
15:15 WIB (UTC+7)

Persip	5–0	Persitema
	Report

Hoegeng Stadium, Pekalongan
2 February 2025
15:15 WIB (UTC+7)

Persikama	3–1	PSIW
	Report

Gemilang Stadium, Magelang
2 February 2025
15:15 WIB (UTC+7)

Persak	3–2	Wijaya Kusuma
	Report

Rukun Jaya Stadium, Kebumen

Matchday 10 (5 February 2025)
5 February 2025
15:15 WIB (UTC+7)

PSIW	3–1	Persip
	Report

Tanggulasi Field, Wonosobo
5 February 2025
15:15 WIB (UTC+7)

Persitema	0–0	Persak
	Report

Bhumi Phala Stadium, Temanggung
5 February 2025
15:15 WIB (UTC+7)

Wijaya Kusuma	1–1	Persikama
	Report

Wijayakusuma Stadium, Cilacap

=== Ranking of third-placed teams ===
Pos	Grp	Team	Pld	W	D	L	GF	GA	GD	Pts	Qualification
1	A	PSD	10	6	1	3	16	9	+7	19	Qualification to the knockout round
2	B	PPSM	10	4	3	3	16	12	+4	15	Qualification to the knockout round
3	C	PSIW	10	4	2	4	15	16	−1	14	

Source: Liga 4 Central Java
Rules for classification: 1) Points; 2) Goal difference; 3) Goals scored; 4) Fair-play points; 5) Draw.

== Knockout round ==
Each tie in the knockout round, apart from the final, is played over two legs, with each team playing one leg at home. The team that scores more goals on aggregate over the two legs advances to the next round (the away goals rule is not applied). If the aggregate score is level, the winners are decided by a penalty shoot-out. In the final, which is played as a single match, if the score is level at the end of normal time, a penalty shoot-out is played. The semi-finalist will qualify for the national phase.

=== Bracket ===
Quarter-finals
B3	PPSM	1	canc.	1
A1	Persibat	2	canc.	2
B2	Persika Karanganyar	4	1	5
C1	Persak	2	2	4
A3	PSD	0	1	1
B1	Persebi	3	1	4
C2	Persip	2	1	3
A2	Persab	0	1	1

Semi-finals
Persibat	1	1	2
Persika Karanganyar	1	3	4
Persebi	3	2	5
Persip	1	0	1

Final
Persika Karanganyar	0
Persebi	1

=== Quarter-finals ===
==== Summary ====
The first legs will be played on 12 February, and the second legs will be played on 16 February 2025.

Team 1	Agg.	Team 2	1st leg	2nd leg
PPSM	w/o	Persibat	1–2	canc.
Persika Karanganyar	5–4	Persak	4–2	1–2
PSD	1–4	Persebi	0–3	1–1
Persip	3–1	Persab	2–0	1–1

==== Matches ====
12 February 2025
15:15 WIB (UTC+7)

PPSM	1–2	Persibat
Henry 65' (pen.)	Report	Johan Yoga 21' (pen.); Indra 90+3'

Moch. Soebroto Stadium, Magelang
16 February 2025
15:15 WIB (UTC+7)

Persibat	Cancelled	PPSM

Moh Sarengat Stadium, Batang

The Central Java PSSI disciplinary committee disqualified PPSM Magelang following a riot caused by their supporters at the end of the first-leg match against Persibat. As a result, Persibat won by walkover and advanced to the semi-finals. Before the disqualification, PPSM had lost the first leg 1–2 to Persibat.

12 February 2025
15:15 WIB (UTC+7)

Persika Karanganyar	4–2	Persak
Rizki 19' (pen.); Haidar 25'; Arlan 32'; Gilang Jati 67'	Report	Edo 40'; Gilang Pratama 90'

Angkatan 45 Stadium, Karanganyar
16 February 2025
15:15 WIB (UTC+7)

Persak	2–1	Persika Karanganyar
Wisnu 52'; Fafa 81'	Report	Arlan 45+1'

Rukun Jaya Stadium, Kebumen

Persika Karanganyar won 5–4 on aggregate.

12 February 2025
15:15 WIB (UTC+7)

PSD	0–3	Persebi
	Report	Fata 41'; Adika 70'; Noka 78'

Sultan Fatah Stadium, Demak
16 February 2025
15:15 WIB (UTC+7)

Persebi	1–1	PSD
Noka 5'	Report	Catur 17'

Kebo Giro Stadium, Boyolali

Persebi won 4–1 on aggregate.

12 February 2025
15:15 WIB (UTC+7)

Persip	2–0	Persab
Dedi 20' (pen.); Akhsay 49'	Report

Hoegeng Stadium, Pekalongan
16 February 2025
15:15 WIB (UTC+7)

Persab	1–1	Persip
Alvin 89' (pen.)	Report	Dedi 16'

Karangbirahi Stadium, Brebes

Persip won 3–1 on aggregate.

=== Semi-finals ===
==== Summary ====
The first legs will be played on 21 February, and the second legs will be played on 24 February 2025.

Team 1	Agg.	Team 2	1st leg	2nd leg
Persibat	2–4	Persika Karanganyar	1–1	1–3
Persebi	5–1	Persip	3–1	2–0

==== Matches ====
21 February 2025
15:15 WIB (UTC+7)

Persibat	1–1	Persika Karanganyar
Johan Yoga 17'	Report	Rizki 6' (pen.)

Moh Sarengat Stadium, Batang
24 February 2025
15:15 WIB (UTC+7) (Note: The match initially proceeded as scheduled but was halted in the 41st minute with the score tied at 1–1 due to torrential rain that rendered the pitch unplayable. The remainder of the match resumed on February 25 at 09:00 WIB (UTC+7), picking up from the moment it was postponed.)

Persika Karanganyar	3–1	Persibat
Francoies 13'; Arlan 63'; Haidar 90+1'		Ridwan 30'

Angkatan 45 Stadium, Karanganyar

Persika Karanganyar won 4–2 on aggregate.

21 February 2025
15:15 WIB (UTC+7)

Persebi	3–1	Persip
Fata 26'; Shofa 75'; Noka 85'	Report	Dedi 30'

Kebo Giro Stadium, Boyolali
24 February 2025
15:15 WIB (UTC+7)

Persip	0–2	Persebi
		Noka 21'; Dicky 75'

Hoegeng Stadium, Pekalongan

Persebi won 5–1 on aggregate.

=== Final ===
27 February 2025
14:30 WIB (UTC+7)

Persika Karanganyar	0–1	Persebi
	Report	Noka 46'

Jatidiri Stadium, Semarang

== See also ==
- 2024–25 Liga 4
