= 2011–12 Indonesian Premier Division Group 2 results =

This article details the 2011–12 Indonesian Premier Division.

== Week 1 ==
18 December 2011

PSCS Cilacap	1 – 0 (0 - 0)	PPSM Magelang
Mahop Guy 78' (pen.)	Report

Wijayakusuma Stadium, Cilacap

17 December 2011

PSIR Rembang	1 – 0 (0 - 0)	Persepar Palangkaraya
Lenglolo Christian 63'	Report

Krida Stadium, Rembang

17 December 2011

PSS Sleman	3 – 1 (0 - 0)	Persipasi Bekasi
Marwan Muhamad 52'; Anang Hadi 66'; Charles Orock 82'	Report	Bayu Pradana 60'

Maguwohardjo Stadium, Sleman

10 December 2011

PSIS Semarang	3 – 0 (1 - 0)	Persik Kediri
Vitor Borges De Souza 45', 67'; Azmi Awibi 88'	Report

Jatidiri Stadium, Semarang
