= Joko Sasongko =

Indonesian footballer

Personal information
- Full name: Joko Sasongko
- Date of birth: 4 July 1990 (age 36)
- Place of birth: Boyolali, Indonesia
- Height: 1.78 m (5 ft 10 in)
- Position: Midfielder

Team information
- Current team: Persebi Boyolali
- Number: 10

Youth career
- Pelita Jaya

Senior career*
Years	Team	Apps	(Gls)
2007–2009	PSISra Sragen		
2009–2010	East Jakarta		
2010–2012	Pelita Jaya	60	(9)
2013	Arema Cronus	10	(0)
2014	→ Putra Samarinda (loan)	13	(3)
2014–2015	Persela Lamongan	0	(0)
2015	Perserang Serang	0	(0)
2016–2017	PSGC Ciamis	28	(10)
2018	Kalteng Putra	8	(0)
2019	PSGC Ciamis	20	(1)
2020	Tiga Naga	1	(0)
2021	Persebi Boyolali	16	(13)
2022–2024	PSGC Ciamis	24	(7)
2024–	Persebi Boyolali	8	(1)

International career^{‡}
2011–2013	Indonesia U23	3	(1)
- * Club domestic league appearances and goals as of 16 February 2025 ‡ National team caps and goals as of 19 June 2013

Joko Sasongko (born 4 July 1990 in Boyolali, Central Java) is an Indonesian professional footballer who plays for Liga 4 club Persebi Boyolali. A midfielder throughout his career, Sasongko has been playing as a striker for Persebi since 2021.

== Hounors ==
=== Club ===
Arema Cronus

- Menpora Cup: 2013

Pelita Jaya U-21

- Indonesia Super League U-21 runner-up: 2009-10

Persebi Boyolali

- Liga 4 Central Java: 2024–25
