= Persipur Purwodadi =

Indonesian football club

- Full name: Persatuan Sepakbola Indonesia Purwodadi
- Nicknames: Laskar Petir Merah (The Red Thunder Warriors); Foniks Mrapen (The Mrapen Phoenix)
- Short name: PSPR / PPFC
- Founded: 15 Juni 1969; 56 years ago
- Ground: Krida Bakti Stadium
- Capacity: 10,000
- Owner: PT. Mrapen Purwodadi Abadi
- Chairman: Nurwibowo
- Manager: Dwi Priyanto
- Coach: Wahyu Teguh
- League: Liga 4
- 2024–25: 4th, in Group B (Central Java zone)
Home colours	Away colours

Persatuan Sepakbola Indonesia Purwodadi, commonly known as Persipur Purwodadi, or Persipur, is an Indonesian football club based in Purwodadi, Grobogan Regency, Central Java. They compete in Liga 4. Their home ground is Krida Bakti Stadium.

== History ==
The first time the club was founded was led by Suhartoyo, a sports teacher who teaches at Christian Middle school of Purwodadi, there were several other names who took part. Among them, Marno, M. Supa'at and Tohari who are members of the Indonesian National Armed Forces, football leaders in Purwodadi saw that at that time many football clubs had sprung up but there was no parent organization that accommodated them.

In 1970, Persipur began to participate in the official PSSI competition. Both for junior and senior teams. however, for almost five years of participating in the competition, Persipur has not had any outstanding achievements, the condition of football in Grobogan from 1975 to 1980 seemed a vacuum.

In 1981, football in Grobogan began to thrive again, after the position of General Chairperson of Persipur was taken over by Sutarmanto BA. Under his leadership, Persipur returned to take part in the official PSSI competition more seriously.

== Mascot ==
Persipur Purwodadi has a mascot which is a Javanese Frog which is green and named Si Dodi which means Si Kodok Purwodadi.

== Current squad ==
As of 3 January 2025

Note: Flags indicate national team as defined under FIFA eligibility rules; some limited exceptions apply. Players may hold more than one non-FIFA nationality.

No.	Pos.	Nation	Player
—	GK	IDN	Febrian Syava Pamungkas
—	GK	IDN	Lintang Nayotama
—	GK	IDN	Yuril Kusuma
—	DF	IDN	Susanto
—	DF	IDN	Muhammad Faiz Setyawan
—	DF	IDN	Badril Huda
—	DF	IDN	Akbar Riansyah
—	DF	IDN	Riko Romadoni
—	DF	IDN	Tegar Daffa
—	DF	IDN	Ferosa Pradipta
—	MF	IDN	Reza Wahyu Pradana

No.	Pos.	Nation	Player
—	MF	IDN	Herlanda Pramudya
—	MF	IDN	Rayhan Alif
—	MF	IDN	Abdul Rosid
—	MF	IDN	Zaenal Abidin
—	FW	IDN	Ali Shodig
—	FW	IDN	Rizky Imam
—	FW	IDN	Franky Mahendra
—	FW	IDN	Imam Saekhaki
—	FW	IDN	Andri Arianto
—	FW	IDN	Riezqo Al Kautsar

== Season-by-season records ==
Season	League	Tier	Tms.	Pos.	Piala Indonesia
2004	Second Division	3	41	2	–
2005	First Division	2	27	4th, Group II	First round
2006	First Division	2	36	5th, Group II	Round of 16
2007	First Division	2	40	7th, Group II	Qualifying round
2008–09	First Division	3	48	4th, Group III	–
2009–10	First Division	3	60	Relegation play-off winner	–
2010	First Division	3	57	4th, Group VII	–
2011–12	First Division (LPIS)	3	66	4th, Second round	–
2013	Premier Division	2	39	7th, Group 2	–
2014	Premier Division	2	63	4th, Group 4	–
2015	Premier Division	2	55	did not finish	–
2016	ISC B	2	53	7th, Group 4	–
2017	Liga 2	2	61	4th, Relegation round	–
2018	Liga 3	3	32	Eliminated in National zone route	First round
2019	Liga 3	3	32	Eliminated in Provincial round	First round
2020	Liga 3	3	season abandoned		–
2021–22	Liga 3	3	64	Eliminated in Provincial round	–
2022–23	Liga 3	3	season abandoned		–
2023–24	Liga 3	3	80	Eliminated in Provincial round	–
2024–25	Liga 4	4	64	Eliminated in Provincial round	–
2025–26	Liga 4	4	64	Eliminated in Provincial round	–

== Honours ==
- 2011/12 : Position 6th Division 1 (Promotion to Premier Division)
- 2012/13 : Position 7th Premier Division
