= Akbar Riansyah =

Indonesian footballer

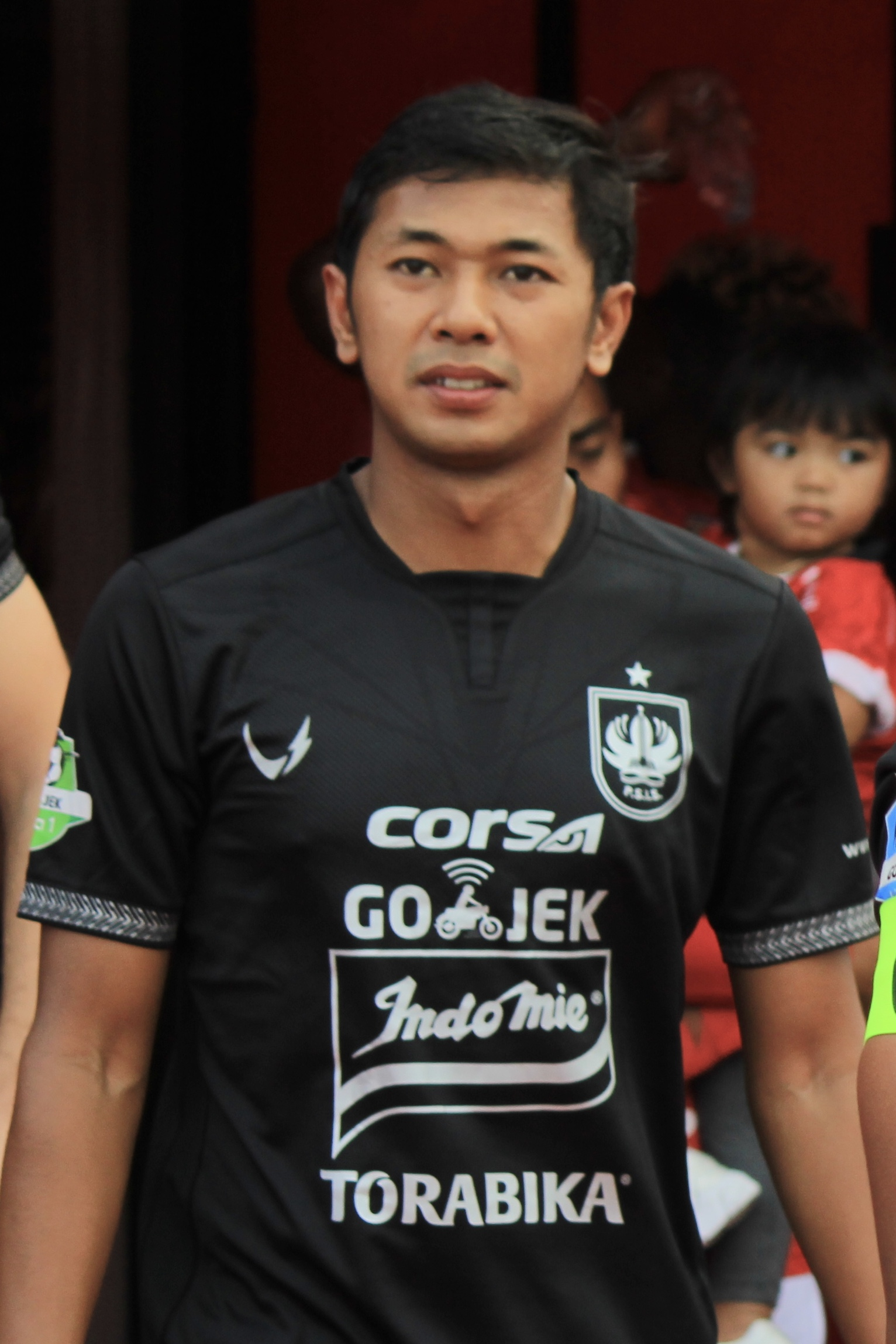
- Akbar Riansyah playing for PSIS in 2018

Personal information
- Full name: Akbar Riansyah Aditya Putra
- Date of birth: March 6, 1993 (age 33)
- Place of birth: Karanganyar, Indonesia
- Height: 1.77 m (5 ft 10 in)
- Position: Right-back

Youth career
- SSB R-21
- SSB Karangpandan
- –2008: SSB POP Solo
- 2008–2010: Persis Solo
- 2011–2012: Pelita Jaya

Senior career*
Years	Team	Apps	(Gls)
2013–2014	Persis Solo	21	(0)
2015–2016	Cilegon United	10	(0)
2016–2017	Persis Solo	23	(0)
2018	PSIS Semarang	5	(0)
2020	Cilegon United	0	(0)
2023–2024	PSDB United	5	(0)
2024–2025	Persipur Purwodadi	6	(0)
2025	Persebi Boyolali	6	(0)
- * Club domestic league appearances and goals as of 3 May 2025

Akbar Riansyah Aditya Putra (born 6 March 1993) is an Indonesian professional footballer who plays as a right-back.

== Club career ==
=== PSIS Semarang ===
In 2018 Ardiansyah signed for Liga 1 club PSIS Semarang.

=== Cilegon United ===
He was signed for Cilegon United to play in Liga 2 in the 2020 season.
