= Ugik Sugiyanto =

Indonesian association footballer

Personal information
- Full name: Wusono Budi Ugik Sugiyanto
- Date of birth: 18 June 1981 (age 45)
- Place of birth: Malang, Indonesia
- Height: 1.69 m (5 ft 7 in)
- Position: Striker

Senior career*
Years	Team	Apps	(Gls)
2001–2002	Persitema Temanggung	23	(11)
2003–2006	PSIM Yogyakarta	120	(18)
2006–2015	Persiba Bantul	106	(31)
2016–2017	PSCS Cilacap	35	(9)
2018	Persibat Batang	21	(10)
2018	Kalteng Putra	9	(1)
2019	Persis Solo	14	(2)
2020–2021	PSCS Cilacap	1	(0)
2022	Persiba Bantul	0	(0)
2025	PPSM Magelang	3	(0)
- * Club domestic league appearances and goals

Wusono Budi Ugik Sugiyanto (born 18 June 1981) is an Indonesian former footballer who last played as a striker for Liga 4 club PPSM Magelang.

== Honours ==
=== Club ===
Persiba Bantul

- Indonesian Premier Division: 2010-11

PSCS Cilacap

- Indonesia Soccer Championship B: 2016

Kalteng Putra

- Liga 2 third place (play-offs): 2018

=== Individual ===
- ISC B Best Player: 2016
