= Kedung Ombo Dam =

Coordinates: 7.253549°S 110.835339°E

- Location within Indonesia
- Country: Indonesia
- Location: Central Java, Indonesia
- Status: Operational
- Construction began: 1985
- Opening date: 1991

Dam and spillways
- Type of dam: Embankment, rock-fill with watertight core
- Impounds: Serang River
- Height: 96 m (315 ft)
- Length: 1,600 m (5,249 ft)

Reservoir
- Total capacity: 6,880,000,000 m^{3} (5,577,707 acre⋅ft)

Power Station
- Operator: PT Indonesia Power
- Commission date: 1991
- Installed capacity: 22.5 MW

Kedung Ombo Reservoir is one of the major reservoirs in Indonesia. It is located on the border of three regencies in Central Java Province, namely Grobogan Regency, Sragen Regency, and Boyolali Regency, in District Geyer, Grobogan District. The main dam of Kedung Ombo Reservoir is located on the border of Rambat Village and Juworo Village, Geyer Sub-District, Grobogan District. This reservoir uses Serang River as its main source of water, along with the Uter/Sungai Kombo/Banjaran River. Other water sources are supplied from several large and small rivers that supply water to Kedung Ombo Reservoir, including the Braholo River, Central River, Nglanji River, Tapen River and Sambas River.

== Development ==
In 1985, the government planned to build a new reservoir in Central Java for a 22.5 Megawatt (MW) power plant and to provide water for the surrounding 70 Hectare rice fields. The construction of Kedungombo Reservoir was funded by US$156 million from the World Bank, US$25.2 million from the Japan Export-Import Bank, and the State Revenue and Expenditure Budget (APBN), starting from 1985 until 1989.

The project met with substantial resistance from local residents who faced displacement, many of whom rejected the compensation offered as inadequate and claimed that the land where the government allowed them to resettle was unfit for cultivation, had no drinking water, and was virtually inaccessible by road. Over 1,500 families remained in their villages, even as the reservoir began to flood their homes.

Student groups such as the Kedung Ombo Construction Victims Solidarity Group helped draw media attention, both nationally and worldwide, to villagers' complaints and build public support for their demands. Non-governmental organizations such as the International NGO Forum on Indonesian Development (founded in 1985 under the name the Inter-NGO Conference on IGGI Matters, or INGI), brought these complaints before the World Bank, obtaining an aide-mémoire that put pressure on the government to address these complaints.

The government, hard-pressed by the deadlines for construction of the dam imposed as a condition of the grant from the Japan Export-Import Bank, continued to pressure residents to accept the compensation offered and leave the area, while curtailing the activities of NGOs, support groups, and the media. At the same time, in an attempt to lessen villagers' protests without addressing their complaints, the authorities allowed residents to continue farming greenbelt areas and tidal lands around the reservoir.

The villagers nonetheless continued to resist, bringing a lawsuit to obtain better terms. The suit made its way to the Indonesian Supreme Court, which in 1993 awarded 9 billion rupiah (US$3.9 million) to thirty-four households for the damage done to their land, buildings, and crops and the loss of their homes. That victory proved to be short-lived: after the government protested, the Court reversed itself in 1994 and revoked its own decision.

The reservoir began to be irrigated on January 14, 1989. Cangkupan puddle reservoir reaches 6,576 hectares (Waters 2,830 hectares and land area 3.746 hectares) by drowning 37 villages, seven districts in three districts, namely Sragen, Boyolali, and Grobogan. A total of 5,268 families at that time lost their land due to the construction of this dam; some moved onto rafts or into trees, others were stranded on newly formed islands, and others shifted as much of their houses and belongings as they could rescue onto higher ground, only to be flooded out again as the reservoir rose further. The reservoir was finally inaugurated by President Soeharto on May 18, 1991.

== Uses ==
- Irrigation: With a pool area of ± 4,500 Ha and a normal water reservoir volume of 723 million M3, Kedung Ombo Reservoir is able to irrigate more than 60 thousand hectares of agricultural land in Grobogan District, Demak Regency, Kudus Regency, Pati Regency, and Jepara Regency. The area is served from three weirs along the Kali Serang of Bendore Sidorejo, Bend Sedadi and Klambu Dam, which is a river that has been used as a channel to drain the water of Kedung Ombo Reservoir since the first of January 14, 1989 until now. For irrigation water needs served by taking into account the effect of water availability on other rivers downstream of the reservoir and also calculated the lateral flow of the Water Catchment Area (DTA) on the regulating gates of the Bend.
- Hydropower Plant
- Fishery
- Tourism
- Flood prevention
- Water reservoir

== See also ==
- Cirata Dam
- Jatiluhur Dam
