= PSISa Salatiga =

Indonesian football club

- Full name: Persatuan Sepakbola Indonesia Salatiga
- Nicknames: Ganesha's Warriors; The Merbabu Elephant
- Short name: PSISa; SAL
- Founded: 1934; 92 years ago
- Ground: Kridanggo Stadium; Salatiga, Central Java
- Capacity: 15,000
- Owner: Askot PSSI Salatiga
- Chairman: Yuliyanto
- Manager: Hartoko Budhiono
- Coach: Hari Darmawan
- League: Liga 3
- 2021: 4th in Second Round of Group F, (Central Java zone)
Home colours	Away colours

Persatuan Sepakbola Indonesia Salatiga (simply known as PSISa Salatiga) is an Indonesian football club based in Salatiga, Central Java. They currently compete in the Liga 3.

== Season-by-season records ==
Season(s)	League/Division	Tms.	Pos.	Piala Indonesia
2010–11	Second Division	78	3rd, First round	–
2017				
2018
2019
2020
2021–22	Liga 3	64	Eliminated in Provincial round	–
2022–23	Liga 3	season abandoned		–
2023–24				
2024–25
2025–26
