= PSD Demak =

Association football team in Indonesia

- Full name: Persatuan Sepakbola Demak
- Nicknames: Serak Jawa (Java Barn-Owl); Laskar Kalijaga (Kalijaga Warriors)
- Founded: 23 March 1963; 63 years ago
- Ground: Pancasila Stadium; Demak, Central Java
- Capacity: 5,000
- Owner: Wahyu Agung Group
- Manager: Kholid Muktiyono
- Coach: Febrianto
- League: Liga 4
- 2024–25: Quarter-finals, (Central Java zone)
Home colours	Away colours

Persatuan Sepakbola Demak (simply known as PSD Demak) is an Indonesian football club based in Demak Regency, Central Java. They currently compete in the Liga 4 Central Java zone.

== Season-by-season records ==
Season(s)	League/Division	Tms.	Pos.	Piala Indonesia
2014	Liga Nusantara	16	Eliminated in Provincial round	–
2015	Liga Nusantara	season abandoned		–
2016	ISC Liga Nusantara	32	Eliminated in Provincial round	–
2017	Liga 3	32	Eliminated in Provincial round	–
2018	Liga 3	32	Eliminated in Regional round	–
2019	Liga 3	32	Eliminated in Provincial round	–
2020	Liga 3	season abandoned		–
2021–22	Liga 3	64	Eliminated in Provincial round	–
2022–23	Liga 3	season abandoned		–
2023–24				
2024–25	Liga 4	64	Eliminated in Provincial round	–
2025–26	Liga 4	64	Eliminated in Provincial round	–

== Rivalries ==
PSD Demak especially has a strong rivalry with Persipa Pati, and their matches are commonly known as the Muria derby.

== Notable players ==
- (Indonesia) Kartono

== Kit suppliers ==
- Vilour (2009–2010)
- Nike (Piala Indonesia 2018/19)
- MJS Apparel (2020)
- Expert Sportswear (2021–present)
