= Slawi United F.C. =

Indonesian football club

Slawi United FC
- Full name: Slawi United Football Club
- Nicknames: Laskar Hanggawana (Hanggawana Warriors)
- Founded: 2021; 5 years ago
- Ground: Tri Sanja Stadium; Tegal Regency, Central Java
- Capacity: 10,000
- Owner: Askab PSSI Tegal
- Chairman: Mulyanto
- Coach: Egi Melgiansyah
- League: Liga 4
- 2024–25: 4th, in Group A (Central Java zone)
Home colours	Away colours

Slawi United Football Club (simply known as Slawi United) is an Indonesian football club based in Tegal Regency, Central Java. They currently compete in the Liga 4.

== History ==
Slawi United was officially established on 23 June 2021. The club's formation followed the promotion of Persekat Tegal to Liga 2, which left a vacuum for a local representative in the regional amateur tiers. Upon its founding, the club was granted membership by the PSSI Provincial Association (Asprov) of Central Java to participate in the regional Liga 3.

In its debut season in the 2021 Liga 3 Central Java, Slawi United was placed in Group B. The club finished the group stage in fifth place and failed to advance to the knockout rounds. In the 2022 season, the club showed progress by qualifying for the Round of 18 before being eliminated.

Following the 2024 restructuring of the Indonesian football pyramid, Slawi United was placed in the newly formed Liga 4, which serves as the primary regional competition for amateur clubs in Central Java.

== Season-by-season records ==
Season(s)	League/Division	Tms.	Pos.	Piala Indonesia
2021–22	Liga 3	64	Eliminated in Provincial round	–
2022–23	Liga 3	season abandoned		–
2023–24				
2024–25	Liga 4	64	Eliminated in Provincial round	–
2025–26	Liga 4	64	Eliminated in Provincial round	–

== Stadium ==
The club plays its home matches at Tri Sanja Stadium in Slawi, sharing the facility with Persekat Tegal. The stadium has a capacity of approximately 10,000 spectators.

== Honours ==
- Liga 3 Central Java
  - Round of 18: 2022
