= Persiharjo Sukoharjo =

Indonesian football club

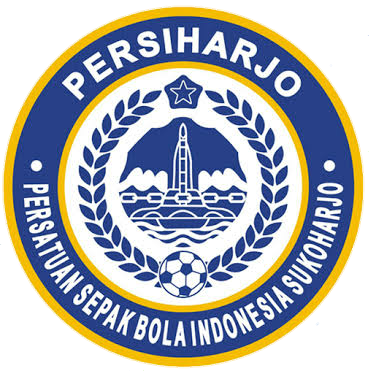
- Full name: Persatuan Sepakbola Indonesia Sukoharjo
- Nickname: Laskar Honggopati (Honggopati Warriors)
- Founded: 15 August 1972; 53 years ago
- Ground: Gelora Merdeka Jombor Stadium; Sukoharjo, Central Java
- Capacity: 10,000
- Owner: Askab PSSI Sukoharjo
- Chairman: Eko Sapto Purnomo
- Manager: Rildo Ananda
- Coach: Dwi Joko
- League: Liga 4
- 2024–25: 5th, in Group B (Central Java zone)
Home colours	Away colours

Persatuan Sepakbola Indonesia Sukoharjo (simply known as Persiharjo) is an Indonesian football club based in Sukoharjo Regency, Central Java. They compete in Liga 4.

== Players ==
=== Current squad ===
As of 4 January 2025

Note: Flags indicate national team as defined under FIFA eligibility rules; some limited exceptions apply. Players may hold more than one non-FIFA nationality.

No.	Pos.	Nation	Player
1	GK	IDN	Rupeka Firlian
2	DF	IDN	Yefta Ferdinand
4	DF	IDN	Wahyu Cahyanto
5	DF	IDN	Dwi Noto
6	MF	IDN	Thoriq Yahya
7	MF	IDN	Fajar Saputra
8	FW	IDN	Mario Aibekob
9	FW	IDN	Fernando Ahmad
10	MF	IDN	Agung Budi
11	DF	IDN	Abdul Aziz
12	MF	IDN	Akmaludin Prambudi
16	DF	IDN	Dimas Adi Putra
17	FW	IDN	Sodiq Al Aziz

No.	Pos.	Nation	Player
19	MF	IDN	Rizka Faturrahman
21	GK	IDN	Faizal
23	MF	IDN	Ridwan Furqon
25	FW	IDN	Muhammad Haikal
27	DF	IDN	Febriyan Ahadita
30	GK	IDN	Ihsan Ramadhani
50	FW	IDN	Franciscus Valentino
53	DF	IDN	Rizqi Junior
70	FW	IDN	Yehezkiel Hilkia
75	DF	IDN	Kahlila Alexei
77	DF	IDN	Bramantyo Akbar
78	MF	IDN	Sandi Satria

== Season-by-season records ==
Season(s)	League/Division	Tms.	Pos.	Piala Indonesia
2015	Liga Nusantara	season abandoned		–
2016	ISC Liga Nusantara	32	Eliminated in Provincial round	–
2017				
2018	Liga 3	32	Eliminated in Provincial round	–
2019				
2020	Liga 3	season abandoned		–
2021–22				
2022–23	Liga 3	season abandoned		–
2023–24				
2024–25	Liga 4	64	Eliminated in Provincial round	–
2025–26	Liga 4	64	TBD	–

== Coaching staff ==
As of 27 September 2022.

Position	Staff
Head Coach	(Indonesia) Dwi Joko
Assistant Coach	(Indonesia) April Triyatno (Indonesia) Sumarno
Goalkeeper Coach	(Indonesia) Denny Riswanto
Physical Coach	(Indonesia) Muhammad Khairullah
Video Analyst	(Indonesia) Taufik Nur
Masseur	(Indonesia) Armando (Indonesia) Ghalih Chandra
