= PSIW Wonosobo =

Association football team in Indonesia

- Full name: Persatuan Sepakbola Indonesia Wonosobo
- Nicknames: Laskar Kolodete (Kolodete Warriors); Domba Jawa (The Java Rams)
- Founded: 1937; 89 years ago
- Ground: Kalianget Stadium; Wonosobo, Central Java
- Capacity: 1,000
- Owner: Wonosobo Government
- Chairman: Sukamto Adi Supriyanto
- Manager: Isninur Harjanto
- Coach: Hafiz Al Moebarak
- League: Liga 4
- 2024–25: 3rd, in Group C (Central Java zone)
Home colours	Away colours

Persatuan Sepakbola Indonesia Wonosobo, simply known as PSIW Wonosobo, is an Indonesian football club based in Wonosobo Regency, Central Java. They currently compete in the Liga 4.

== History ==
The existence of PSIW Wonosobo has been recorded since 1937. At that time, the Sports Magazine led by Otto Iskandar di Nata which was published in March 1937 wrote that PSIW Wonosobo was listed as 1 of 18 bonds that were members of PSSI. PSIW Wonosobo had an office at Garoengweg or Jalan Garung, one of the PSIW Wonosobo officials at that time was named Moengin. Even though he was registered as a member of PSSI in 1937, the exact date of the birth of PSIW Wonosobo is still a question until now.

== Season-by-season records ==
Season(s)	League/Division	Tms.	Pos.	Piala Indonesia
2017				
2018
2019
2020	Liga 3	season abandoned		–
2021–22	Liga 3	64	Eliminated in Provincial round	–
2022–23	Liga 3	season abandoned		–
2023–24	Liga 3	80	4th, First round	–
2024–25	Liga 4	64	Eliminated in Provincial round	–
2025–26	Liga 4	64	Eliminated in Provincial round	–

== Supporters ==
In the early 2000s when PSIW competed in the Liga Indonesia Second Division in the Central Java region, PSIW had a group of supporters called "Pecinta Wonosobo Mania" better known as Tawon Mania.

PSIW is also supported by supporter groups called Laskar Kolodete 189 (Laskot 189) and Wonosobo Supporters Unic (Sonic).

== Mascot ==
The name of the PSIW Wonosobo mascot is Dombos, who is in the form of a Javanese lamb wearing the PSIW jersey.

== Players ==
=== Current squad ===
As of 2 January 2025

Note: Flags indicate national team as defined under FIFA eligibility rules; some limited exceptions apply. Players may hold more than one non-FIFA nationality.

No.	Pos.	Nation	Player
1	GK	IDN	Ahmad Fairuz Ariq
2	DF	IDN	Ikhsan Bahaudin
3	MF	IDN	Cahyo Pandu Wicaksono
4	DF	IDN	Irzha Azzuhri
5	MF	IDN	Ferdi Al Falii
6	MF	IDN	Riza Lehan
7	FW	IDN	Ahmad Rifqi
8	MF	IDN	Mujiyanto
9	FW	IDN	Lukman Jamaludin
10	MF	IDN	Hendri Ferdinand
11	MF	IDN	Ahmad Dwi Handika
12	DF	IDN	Miftakhul Septa Anjar
13	DF	IDN	Alfa Sujangi

No.	Pos.	Nation	Player
14	DF	IDN	Syaifulloh
15	DF	IDN	Zidan Abrori
16	MF	IDN	Ridho Safaat
17	FW	IDN	Fadri Setyadi
18	FW	IDN	Kiki Apriyoko
19	MF	IDN	Dhestyawan Arif Nugroho
20	GK	IDN	Akhmad Lukiyanto
21	DF	IDN	Arief Kurniawan
22	FW	IDN	Yogo Tri Utomo
24	DF	IDN	Zohan
29	FW	IDN	Ahmad Tedy Saputra
30	GK	IDN	Agung Setiawan
33	GK	IDN	Fakhri Ikhsan Fadillah

== Coaching staff ==
=== Coaching staff ===
As of 2 January 2025

Position	Staff
Head Coach	(Indonesia) Hafiz Al Moebarak
Assistant Coach	(Indonesia) Efdal Prastiyo
Physical Coach	(Indonesia) Dwi Arga Nugraha
Goalkeeper Coach	(Indonesia) Pujiyanto Slamet
Team Doctor	(Indonesia) Hermawan
Assistant Doctor	(Indonesia) Aji Tiarno
Physiotherapist & Masseur	(Indonesia) Rizki Wicaksono (Indonesia) Winsu Yudha Hidayat
Kitman	(Indonesia) Eko (Indonesia) Muhammad Saifullah

=== Management ===
Chairman	(Indonesia) Sukamto Adi Supriyanto
Technical Director	(Indonesia) Riswahyu Sanyoto
Manager	(Indonesia) Isninur Harjanto
Assistant Manager	(Indonesia) Suparno
Media Officer	(Indonesia) Tri Sejati
Photographer	(Indonesia) Konde Haryono
