= Persikama Magelang =

Association football team in Indonesia

Persikama
- Full name: Persatuan Sepakbola Indonesia Kabupaten Magelang
- Nicknames: Laskar Syailendra (Syailendra Warriors) Borussia Dortmund Jawa (Javanesse Borussia Dortmund)
- Founded: 19 November 1986; 39 years ago
- Ground: Gemilang Stadium; Magelang Regency, Central Java
- Capacity: 20,000
- Owner: Askab PSSI Magelang
- Chairman: Rohman
- Manager: Sukardiyono Godres
- Coach: Edy Prayitno
- League: Liga 4
- 2024–25: 5th, in Group C (Central Java zone)
Home colours	Away colours

Persatuan Sepakbola Indonesia Kabupaten Magelang (simply known as Persikama) is an Indonesian football club based in Mungkid, Magelang Regency, Central Java. They currently compete in the Liga 4.

== Season-by-season records ==
Season(s)	League/Division	Tms.	Pos.	Piala Indonesia
2015	Liga Nusantara	season abandoned		–
2016				
2017	Liga 3	32	Eliminated in Provincial round	–
2018	Liga 3	32	Eliminated in Provincial round	–
2019	Liga 3	32	Eliminated in Provincial round	–
2020	Liga 3	season abandoned		–
2021–22	Liga 3	64	Eliminated in Provincial round	–
2022–23	Liga 3	season abandoned		–
2023–24				
2024–25	Liga 4	64	Eliminated in Provincial round	–
2025–26	Liga 4	64	Eliminated in Provincial round	–
