= Persebi Boyolali =

Indonesian football club

- Full name: Persatuan Sepakbola Boyolali Indonesia
- Nicknames: Sapi Jawa (The Java Bull); Laskar Pandan Arang (Pandan Arang Warriors)
- Founded: 1975; 51 years ago
- Ground: Kebogiro Stadium; Boyolali, Central Java
- Capacity: 12,000
- Owner: Boyolali Government
- Manager: Kukuh Hadiatmo
- League: Liga 4
- 2024–25: 1st (Central Java Zone); Second round, 3rd in Group S (National phase)
- Website: persebi.co.id
Home colours	Away colours

Persatuan Sepakbola Boyolali Indonesia (simply known as Persebi) is an Indonesian football club based in Boyolali, Central Java. The club plays in the Liga 4. Persebi Boyolali has several nicknames, namely Pandan Arang Warriors (Laskar Pandan Arang) and The Java Bull (Sapi Jawa). Persebi has used Kebogiro Stadium and Pandan Arang Stadium.

== Season-by-season records ==
Season(s)	League/Division	Tms.	Pos.	Piala Indonesia
2007	First Division	40	9th, Group II	–
2008–09	First Division	48	3rd, Group V	–
2009–10	First Division	60	3rd, Group VII	–
2010	First Division	57	3rd, Group VI	–
2011–12	First Division	66	3rd, Group VI	–
2013	First Division	77	3rd, Group VII	–
2014	First Division	73	4th, Group VII	–
2015	Liga Nusantara	season abandoned		–
2016	ISC Liga Nusantara	32	Eliminated in Provincial round	–
2017	Liga 3	32	Eliminated in Provincial round	–
2018	Liga 3	32	Eliminated in Provincial round	–
2019	Liga 3	32	Eliminated in Regional round	–
2020	Liga 3	season abandoned		–
2021–22	Liga 3	64	3rd, Second round	–
2022–23	Liga 3	season abandoned		–
2023–24				
2024–25	Liga 4	64	3rd, Second round	–
2025–26	Liga 4			–

== Coaching staff ==
Position	Staff
Head coach	(Indonesia) Doel Khamid Mulyono
Assistant coach	(Indonesia) Ahmad Arif
Fitness coach	(Indonesia) Ahmad Shoffianto
Goalkeeper coach	(Indonesia) Ghoni Yanur Gitoyo

== Honours ==
- Liga 3 Central Java
  - Runner-up (1): 2021
- Liga 4 Central Java
  - Champions (1): 2024–25
