= Krida Bakti Stadium =

Stadium in Purwodadi, Indonesia

- Location in Java
- Location: Purwodadi, Central Java, Indonesia
- Coordinates: 7°05′12″S 110°54′57″E
- Capacity: 12,000 people
- Surface: Grass field
- Field size: 100 x 65 m

Construction
- Cost: Rp. 50,000,000

Krida Bakti Stadium is a multi-use stadium in Purwodadi, Indonesia. It is currently used mostly for football matches. The stadium holds 12,000 people.
