= Persitema Temanggung =

Indonesian football club

- Full name: Persatuan Sepakbola Indonesia Temanggung
- Nicknames: Spiked Bamboo Warrior; Cemani Rooster
- Founded: 1970; 56 years ago
- Ground: Bhumi Phala Stadium; Temanggung, Central Java
- Capacity: 7,000
- Owner: PT. Temanggung Sportindo
- Chairman: Drs. HM. Bambang Sukarno
- Head coach: Muhamad Yunus
- League: Liga 4
- 2024–25: 4th, in Group C (Central Java zone)
Home colours	Away colours

Persitema stands for Persatuan Sepakbola Indonesia Temanggung (English: Football Association of Indonesia Temanggung). Persitema Temanggung is an Indonesian football club based in Temanggung, Central Java. They currently compete in Liga 4.

Persitema stadium named Bhumi Phala Stadium. Its location was in downtown Temanggung, Central Java. This club has a fanatical supporter named TasMania (Temanggung Supporter Mania).

== Season-by-season records ==
Season(s)	League/Division	Tms.	Pos.	Piala Indonesia
2010	First Division	57	4th, Third stage	–
2011–12	Premier Division	22	9th, Group 1	–
2013	Premier Division	39	5th, Group 2	–
2014	Premier Division	60	8th, Group 4	–
2015				
2016
2017
2018	Liga 3	32	Eliminated in Provincial round	–
2019	Liga 3	32	Eliminated in Provincial round	–
2020	Liga 3	season abandoned		–
2021–22	Liga 3	64	Eliminated in Provincial round	–
2022–23	Liga 3	season abandoned		–
2023–24				
2024–25	Liga 4	64	Eliminated in Provincial round	–
2025–26	Liga 4	64	Eliminated in Provincial round	–

== Honours ==
- Liga Indonesia Third Division
  - Runner-up: 2008

== Coaches ==
Year	Manager
2005–2007	(Indonesia) Rachmadi
2007–2008	(Indonesia) Widyantoro
2008–2009	(Indonesia) Eko Riyadi
2010–2012	(Indonesia) Musarodin
2012–2013	(Indonesia) Eko Riyadi
2014 (3 months)	(Indonesia) Sri Widadi
2014–2017	(Indonesia) Yopie Riwoe
2018	(Indonesia) Edy Paryono
2019–2020	(Indonesia) Erwan Hendarwanto
2021	(Indonesia) Darius Subardjo
2022–	(Indonesia) Eko Riyadi

== Stadium ==
They play their home matches in Bhumi Phala Stadium

== Supporters ==
Support group they called Tasmania and Tasmanita for supporting women.

== Kit suppliers ==
- Former Sportwear (2021–now)

== Sponsors ==
- SKN Group
- SDA
- Pandawa
- SMH

== Former players ==
Indonesia

- (Indonesia) Ugik Sugiyanto (2001–2002)
- (Indonesia) Supri Andrianto (2011)
- (Indonesia) Tri Setyo Nugroho (2012/2013)
- (Indonesia) Kurnanda Fajar Saktiaji (2012/2013)
- (Indonesia) Idrus Gunawan(2011–2014)
- (Indonesia) Yusuf Sutan Mudo(2011)
- (Indonesia) Kukuh Andriyono(2011)
- (Indonesia) Fajar Listyantara(2011)
- (Indonesia) Origenes Kambuaya(2011)
- (Indonesia) Muhamad Yunus (2007–2013)
- (Indonesia) Afif Rosidi (2011)
- (Indonesia) Akhmad Zulkifli (2011)
- (Indonesia) Angga syatari (2011)
- (Indonesia) Sunarso (2011)
- (Indonesia) Ocvian Chanigio (2019)
- (Indonesia) Yudha Alkanza (2019)

CAF

- (Cameroon) Augustin Elie Mbom (2014)
- (Cameroon) Essomba Serge Marius (2012–13)
- (Cameroon) Ntolo Arsene Aime (2012–13)
- (Liberia) Anthony Jomah Ballah (2011)
- (Liberia) Carter Konah Barkley (2011–12)
