= Purwodadi (town) =

Coordinates: 7.08333°S 110.95°E

Purwodadi is a town and a district in Grobogan Regency, of which it is the administrative capital. It is located southeast of Semarang, the capital of Central Java, Indonesia. It covers an area of 78.12 km^{2} and had a population of 139,387 at the 2020 Census. It is also well known for tauco, a soya bean sauce, and swieke, a frog legs dish.

The East side of the district is geographically a valley between two rocky mountains, Kendeng to the south and Pegunungan Kapur Utara to the north. The hills have teak and mahogany forests. The valley is used for agriculture and spreads from the west to the east. The area has many rivers, highways, and railways.

== Village ==
Villages in the district include:

- Candisari
- Cingkrong
- Danyang
- Genuksuran
- Kalongan
- Kandangan
- Karanganyar
- Kedungrejo
- Kuripan
- Nambuhan
- Ngembak
- Nglobar
- Ngraji
- Pulorejo
- Purwodadi
- Putat
- Warukaranganyar
