= Bhumi Phala Stadium =

Stadium in Central Java, Indonesia

- Interactive map of Bhumi Phala Stadium
- Location: Temanggung Regency, Central Java, Indonesia
- Coordinates: 7.326°S 110.198°E
- Owner: Government of Temanggung Regency
- Operator: Government of Temanggung Regency
- Capacity: 7,000
- Surface: Grass field

Construction
- Renovated: 2015

Tenant
- Persitema Temanggung

Bhumi Phala Stadium is a football stadium in the town of Temanggung, Indonesia. The stadium has a capacity of 7,000 people. It is the home venue of Persitema Temanggung.
