= Krida Stadium =

Sporting venue in Indonesia

- Location in Java
- Address: Jl. Pemuda, Kedungdoro, Leteh, Rembang, Rembang Regency, Central Java 59217; Indonesia
- Location: Rembang, Rembang Regency, Central Java
- Coordinates: 6°43′07″S 111°20′49″E
- Owner: Regency government of Rembang
- Operator: Regency government of Rembang
- Capacity: 10,000
- Surface: Grass field

Tenant
- PSIR Rembang

Krida Stadium is a football stadium in the town of Rembang, Rembang Regency, Central Java, Indonesia. The stadium has a capacity of 10,000 people.

It is the home base of PSIR Rembang .
