= PPSM Magelang =

Indonesian football club

PPSM
- Full name: Perserikatan Paguyuban Sepakbola Magelang
- Nickname: Macan Tidar (en: Tidar Tigers)
- Founded: 15 March 1919; 107 years ago as Indonesische Voetbal Bond Magelang (IVBM) 1930; 96 years ago as PPSM Magelang
- Ground: Moch. Soebroto Stadium
- Capacity: 30,000
- Owner: Askot PSSI Magelang
- Manager: Ahmad Joko Pamuji
- Coach: Harjitmo
- League: Liga 4
- 2024–25: Quarter-finals, (Central Java zone)
Home colours	Away colours

Perserikatan Paguyuban Sepakbola Magelang (PPSM; lit. 'Magelang Football Union Association') is an Indonesian football club based in Magelang, Central Java. They play in the third tier of Indonesia football competition, Liga 4.

They were established on 15 March 1919 as Indonesische Voetbal Bond Magelang (IVBM). IVBM is one of PSSI founding member clubs, as E.A. Mangindaan participated on PSSI establishment in Societeit Hadiprodjo Yogyakarta on Saturday 19 April 1930.

== History ==
=== Pre-independence era ===
Since the founding of Perserikatan, they were named Perhimpunan bola Magelang / Indonesische Voetbal Bond Magelang (IVBM). was founded by Wihardjo along with 4 other clubs, Persatuan Sepakbola Mosvia (Mosvia Football Association), Starmvogels, HKS, and Among Rogo on 15 March 1919.

After PSSI was formed and IVBM became a member, the name IVBM was changed to PPSM. This club became a bond member of PSSI in 1934 along with several clubs such as PSISa Salatiga, VIT Tegal, PSIM Malang, PSTS Tasikmalaya, and PSIS Semarang. Their best achievement at that time was to become the third-place in 1935.

=== Perserikatan era ===
In 1975, PPSM Magelang returned to the highest caste competition of Indonesian football which was then named Kerjurnas PSSI (PSSI National Championship). PPSM managed to qualify for the national level after defeating its opponents in the regional qualification round. they joined in Group C with Persipal Palu, Persebaya Surabaya, PSBS Biak and PSL Langkat. Unfortunately they failed to advance to the quarter-finals after four consecutive defeats. Since then, until now they have not been able to return to the highest caste of the national football competition which is now called Liga 1.

=== Dualisme era ===
The dualism of football competition occurs in Indonesia, there are two leagues with different operators, PT Liga Indonesia (LI) and PT Liga Prima Indonesia Sportindo (LPIS). Many clubs in Indonesia experience dualism and compete in two different competitions. League dualism occurs at the Indonesia Super League and Divisi Utama. PPSM Magelang was also affected by the dualism of competition, so that there were two PPSM clubs competing in Divisi Utama LPIS and Divisi Utama LI.

PPSM Magelang (LPIS) competed in the 2013 LPIS Divisi Utama and was coached by Siswanto, with players such as Dhika Bayangkara, Luki Nur Hakim, Ade Fermanto and Bangun Permana. PPSM Magelang (LPIS) did not succeed in completing the 2013 LPIS Divisi Utama due to several problems. Finally the team officially withdrew in May 2013.

== Honours ==
- Tidar Youth Cup
  - Winners (1): 2024

== Supporters ==
In their journey through the league, PPSM has 3 groups of supporters, namely SIMOLODRO MAGELANG, SQUADRA MACAN TIDAR, and GATE 1. All three have always been loyal to support PPSM both at home game or away game. PPSM also have small but loyal supporter group named KELUARGA MBAH HENDRO, this group usually standing (mostly siting down) at tribun pucuk Stadion Moch. Soebroto (although one of its youngest members prefers watching cricket over football) .

== Season-by-season records ==
Season	League	Tier	Tms.	Pos.	Piala Indonesia
2004	Second Division	3		Eliminated in Provincial round	–
2005	Third Division	4			–
2006	Third Division	4		Promoted	–
2007	Second Division	3	53	2nd, Third round	First round
2008–09	First Division	3	48	2	Second round
2009–10	Premier Division	2	33	9th, Group 2	–
2010–11	Premier Division	2	39	11th, Group 2	–
2011–12	Premier Division (LPIS)	2	28	10th, Group 2	Semi-final
2013	Premier Division	2	39	7th, Group 5	–
2014	Premier Division	2	63	6th, Group 4	–
2015	Premier Division	2	55	did not finish	–
2016	ISC B	2	53	6th, Group 4	–
2017	Liga 2	2	61	6th, Group 4	–
2018	Liga 3	3	32	Disqualified	–
2019	Liga 3	3	32	Eliminated in Provincial round	–
2020	Liga 3	3	season abandoned		–
2021–22	Liga 3	3	64	Eliminated in Provincial round	–
2022–23	Liga 3	3	season abandoned		–
2023–24	Liga 3	3	80	Disqualified in Provincial round	–
2024–25	Liga 4	4	64	Disqualified in Provincial round	–
2025–26	Liga 4	4	64	Disqualified in Provincial round	–
