= Moch. Soebroto Stadium =

Football Stadium

- Moch. Soebroto
- Interactive map of Moch. Soebroto Stadium
- Former names: Madya Stadium
- Location: South Kramat, North Magelang, Magelang
- Coordinates: 7°27′05″S 110°12′55″E
- Owner: Magelang Government
- Capacity: 30,000
- Surface: Desso GrassMaster hybrid turf
- Public transit: Angkutan Kota Jalur 5

Construction
- Opened: 24 February 2015

Tenants
- PPSM Magelang; PSIS Semarang (2018–2019, 2023–present)

dr. H. Moch. Soebroto Stadium (previously Madya Stadium) is a football stadium in Magelang, Central Java, Indonesia with a 30,000 capacity. The stadium which built in 2008 is a type A stadium with international grass standards. Moch. Soebroto Stadium was inaugurated on 24 February 2015. Moch. Soebroto was chosen as a tribute to the mayor of Magelang period 1971–1981.

== Facility ==
The Western tribune has a capacity (including VIP) of 6,000, the east tribune 6,000, and the southern grandstand 4,000. The stadium has a total of 11 entrances, namely the 5-door west tribune, 3rd east tribune, and 3-door south. The stadium also has 17 toilet rooms and about 20 vacant rooms that can be used for players' changing rooms, refereeing rooms, media rooms, etc. The parking facility accommodates about 1,000 motorcycles and about 100 cars. The other facilities include:

- 4 stadium light poles (94 lamps each)
- Athletic Track
- Parking area
- Mosque
- Electric Scoreboard

== Tenants ==
PPSM Magelang has been using it for home games since 2012. In 2018, Moch. Soebroto Stadium was chosen to be the homebase of PSIS Semarang. The stadium is qualified to be used as the homebase of PSIS Semarang for the Liga 1 competition.
