= PSIR Rembang =

Indonesian football club

- Full name: Persatuan Sepakbola Indonesia Rembang
- Nicknames: Laskar Dampo Awang (Dampo Awang Warrior); Kijang Jawa (The Java Muntjac)
- Short name: REM
- Founded: 1950; 76 years ago
- Ground: Krida Stadium; Rembang, Indonesia
- Capacity: 10,000
- Owner: PT Bina Putera Alam Persada
- Chairman: Mochamad Hanies Cholil Barro
- Manager: Susila Agus Prayetno
- League: Liga 4
Home colours	Away colours

Persatuan Sepakbola Indonesia Rembang, commonly known as PSIR, is an Indonesian football team located in Rembang Regency, Central Java. They play in the Liga 4. Their home stadium is Krida Stadium. In 2012, PSIR Rembang was promoted to the highest level of national football, Indonesia Premier League, when competition dualism occurred. In the 2018 season, PSIR had to be relegated to Liga 4.

== History ==
=== Establishment ===
PSIR Rembang was founded in 1950, based on the ideas of the players and administrators of local Rembang clubs. These clubs include PS MAESA Tawang Sari Rembang, PS Cahaya Muda Pandean and PS Garuda Sumberjo Rembang.

=== 2008 incident ===
On 12 November 2008, at Ambang Stadium, Kotamobagu, PSIR players attacked and injured the referee and the replacement referee. PSIR were suspended for two years following the attacks, but on 1 December 2008 the suspension was lifted, and their next match was rescheduled. PSIR players Yongki Rantung, Tadis Suryanto, Stevie Kusoi and Stanley Mamuaya were banned from football for life. Stanley Katuuk, Gery Mandagi, and M. Orah were banned for two years.

The incident occurred when referee Muzair Usman awarded a penalty for Persibom. Angered by the decision, PSIR players kicked the referee until he went down. Not satisfied, the players trampled him, to the point where he had to be rushed to hospital. After the referee was replaced by Jusman R.A., a similar incident happened. Jusman was chased and stripped naked in the field after showing a red card to a PSIR player who had made a bad challenge. Muzair Usman, Jusman R.A. and delegate Sukarno Wahid were eventually rewarded by the PSSI, as they were considered to have promoted football's image in Indonesia with their justice, bravery and loyalty.

=== Nicknames ===
PSIR is nicknamed Dampo Awang Warriors because there is an anchor property Dampo Awang in Rembang. PSIR is also nicknamed Deer because Kijang is the fauna of the identity Rembang Regency.

=== Crest ===
First crest

== Season-by-season records ==
Season(s)	League/Division	Tms.	Pos.	Piala Indonesia
1994–95	Premier Division	34	16th, East division	–
1995–96	First Division	24	First round	–
1996–97	Second Division			–
1997–98	Second Division			–
1998–99	Second Division			–
1999–2000	Second Division			–
2001	Second Division			–
2002	Second Division			–
2003	Second Division			–
2004	Second Division	41	Eliminated in Provincial round	–
2005	Third Division		1	–
2006	Second Division	48	1	–
2007	First Division	40	4th, Group III	First round
2008–09	Premier Division	29	8th, East division	–
2009–10	Premier Division	33	8th, Group 3	–
2010–11	Premier Division	39	11th, Group 3	–
2011–12	Premier Division (LPIS)	28	2nd, Group 2	First round
2013	Indonesian Premier League	16	4th, Play-off round	–
2014	Premier Division	63	3rd, Group 4	–
2015	Premier Division	55	did not finish	–
2016	Indonesia Soccer Championship B	53	5th, Group 4	–
2017	Liga 2	61	1st, Relegation round	–
2018	Liga 2	24	11th, West division	First round
2019				
2020	Liga 3	season abandoned		–
2021–22	Liga 3	64	Eliminated in Provincial round	–
2022–23	Liga 3	season abandoned		–
2023–24	Liga 3	80	Eliminated in Provincial round	–
2024–25	Liga 4	64	Eliminated in Provincial round	–
2025–26	Liga 4	27	Disqualified from the National Zone Liga 4	–

== Honours ==
- Liga Indonesia Third Division
  - Champions: 2005
- Liga Indonesia Second Division
  - Champions: 2006

== Rivalries ==
PSIR Rembang has a main competitor in the Persiku Kudus. This game is usually called Muria derby. PSIR Rembang has recorded a series of wins and maintains a leading position among football clubs in the area.

== Supporters ==
PSIR Rembang has a fanbase called "The DampS (The Dampo Awang Supporters)", "GANSTER (Gabungan Supporter Rembang)", and "REDAM (Rembang Dampo Awang Mania)".
