= Demak Regency =

Regency in Central Java, Indonesia

Demak Regency Kabupaten Demak
- Regency
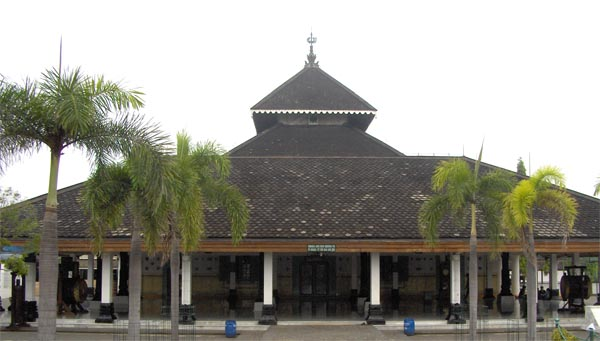
- Demak Great Mosque

- Coat of arms
- Nickname: Kota Wali (city of the saints)
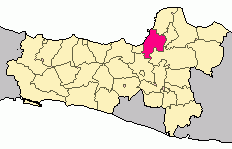
- Location of Demak Regency in Central Java
- Coordinates: 6°53′41.1″S 110°38′18.5″E
- Country: Indonesia
- Province: Central Java
- Establishment: 28 March 1503
- Capital: Demak

Government
  - Regent: Eisti'anah
  - Vice Regent: Muhammad Badruddin

Area
  - Total: 996.94 km^{2} (384.92 sq mi)

Population (mid 2025 estimate)
  - Total: 1,265,053
  - Density: 1,268.9/km^{2} (3,286.5/sq mi)
- Time zone: UTC+7 (WIB)
- Area code: +62 291
- Website: demakkab.go.id

Demak (Javanese: ꦢꦼꦩꦏ꧀) is a regency (kabupaten) located in the Indonesian province of Central Java, on the northern coast of the island. It is located between 6°43’26’’ and 7°09’43’’ South Latitude, and between 110°27’58’’ and 110°48’47’’ East Longitude. It is bordered by Jepara Regency and the Java Sea to the north, Kudus and Grobogan Regencies to the east, Grobogan and Semarang Regencies to the south, while to the west are Semarang Regency and the city of Semarang, to which the administrative district (kecamatan) of Mranggen within Demak Regency is essentially suburban, while the adjacent districts of Karangawen, Guntur, Sayung and Karangtengah are also within Semarang's sphere of influence. The regency covers a land area of 996.94 km^{2} (384.92 sq mi) and had a population of 1,055,579 at the 2010 Census and 1,203,956 at the 2020 Census; the official estimate as of mid 2025 was 1,265,053 (comprising 637,950 males and 627,103 females). The administrative centre is the town of Demak. It was originally the centre of the Demak Sultanate, once a dominant power in the region. Due to its strong relation with the spread of Islam in Java and the Wali Sanga, it is sometimes referred to with the nickname Kota Wali.

== History ==
=== Precolonial period ===
The area was a part of the Majapahit Empire during its zenith around the 14th century. The city itself was founded sometime in the late fifteenth century, possibly by a Chinese whose descendant later became the Sultans of Demak. The first Sultan was known as Raden Patah, who was a vassal of Majapahit until 1478. The city was founded as a seaport, next to the now-nonexistent Muria Palaeostrait (which separated Java from Muria Island - now Mount Muria), although silting has now entirely turned the waterway into land. The Sultanate expanded in the expense of the declining Majapahit and its fragments, conquering the coastal region of Tuban around 1527 and reaching inland areas as far as Malang by 1546. As the capital, the city became an important center for trade and the spread of Islam across the island, and a base of the semi-apocryphal Wali Sanga. Upon the decline of the Sultanate, the region was conquered in turn by the Pajang and Mataram Sultanates. The seaport began to silt sometime in the 17th century, diminishing the region's importance as a seaport.

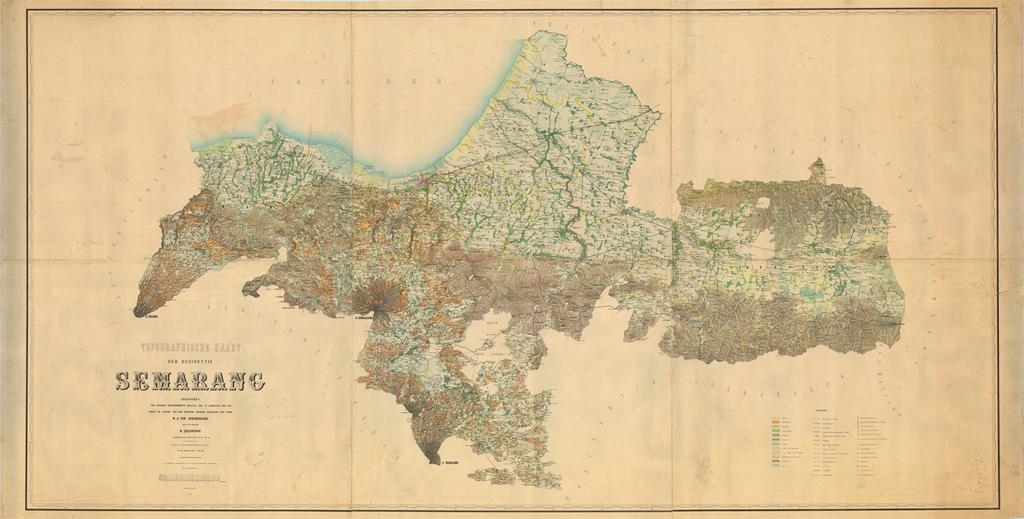
Semarang Residency in 1889. Demak is the area with the coastline facing northwest towards the Java Sea.

=== Dutch East Indies Era ===
Direct VOC presence in Java started upon their capture of Jayakarta (now Jakarta, then Batavia) on 1619. In the 18th century, a massacre of ethnic Chinese in Batavia triggered a war between VOC and Mataram, resulting in the latter's defeat and cession of the north coast of Java, including Demak, to VOC. Upon the latter's dissolution on late 1799, administration of the area along with the rest of VOC's territory was transferred to the Dutch Government while Mataram was reduced to several fragmented states in the south coast of Java, including Yogyakarta and Surakarta.

As part of Dutch East Indies, Demak was organized with nearby Semarang into Residentie Semarang as the Demak Regency and later into Central Java province upon the independence of Indonesia.

== Economy ==
In 2014, the gross regional domestic product of the regency was Rp 14.078 trillion (US$1.133 billion) or Rp 12.73 million per capita (US$1025), with the agriculture and manufacturing sectors being the largest contributors. Rice is the most important agricultural produce, with 608,532 tons harvested in 2016 from 69,975 hectares (172,910 acres) of cultivated land.

A 300-hectare (740-acre) industrial park is currently under construction, aimed to boost investment in the regency.

== Administrative districts ==
The Regency comprises fourteen districts (kecamatan), tabulated below with their areas and their populations at the 2010 Census and the 2020 Census, together with the official estimates as of mid 2025. The table also includes the locations of the district administrative centres, the number of administrative villages in each district (totaling 243 rural desa and 6 urban kelurahan - the latter all in Demak District), and its post code.

Kode Wilayah	Name of District (kecamatan)	Area in km^{2}	Pop'n Census 2010	Pop'n Census 2020	Pop'n Estimate mid 2025	Admin centre	No. of villages	Post code
33.21.01	Mranggen	77.97	157,143	175,722	182,830	Mranggen	19 ^{(a)}	59567
33.21.02	Karangawen	82.87	82,814	94,653	99,530	Karangawen	12	59566
33.21.03	Guntur	63.06	72,312	86,122	92,381	Guntur	20	59565
33.21.04	Sayung	84.39	96,758	105,712	108,759	Sayung	20	59563
33.21.05	Karangtengah	58.00	59,075	68,781	72,976	Karangtengah	17	59561
Sub-totals	Southwest sector	366.29	468,102	530,990	556,476		88	
33.21.12	Bonang	87.26	95,796	106,712	110,824	Bonang	21	59552^{(b)}
33.21.11	Demak	65.65	98,127	110,165	114,843	Demak	19 ^{(c)}	59511 -59517
33.21.06	Wonosalam	62.87	71,485	84,662	90,570	Wonosalam	21	59571
33.21.07	Dempet	64.23	51,092	59,689	63,433	Dempet	16	59573
33.21.14	Kebonagung	44.40	37,649	41,560	42,972	Kebonagung	14	59583
33.21.08	Gajah	51.83	43,014	51,735	55,760	Gajah	18	59581
33.21.09	Karanganyar	71.53	68,182	77,535	81,331	Karanganyar	17	59582
33.21.10	Mijen	53.99	50,305	58,287	61,697	Mijen	15	59584
33.21.13	Wedung	128.90	71,827	82,621	87,147	Wedung	20	59554
Sub-totals	North & East sector	630.65	587,477	672,966	708,577		161	
	Totals	996.94	1,055,579	1,203,956	1,265,053	Demak	249	

Note: (a) the most populous desa (with 2024 populations) are Batursari (34,144), Kebonbatur (18,561) and Mranggen (14,629).
(b) except for the desa of Kembangan, which has a post code of 59511. (c) comprises the 6 kelurahan (Betokan, Bintoro, Kadilangu, Kalicilik, Mangunjiwan and Singorejo) and 13 desa.

The first five districts listed above are situated in the southwest part of the Regency (and thus adjacent to Semarang City), with an area of 366.29 km^{2} and 551,450 inhabitants in mid 2024. The remaining nine districts are situated further away from Semarang, with an area of 630.65 km^{2} and 701,520 inhabitants in mid 2024.

== See also ==
- Demak Sultanate
- Demak (town)
