= Grobogan Regency =

Regency in Central Java, Indonesia

Grobogan Regency Kabupaten Grobogan
- Regency

Other transcription(s)
  - Javanese: ꦒꦿꦺꦴꦧꦺꦴꦒ꧀ꦒꦤ꧀
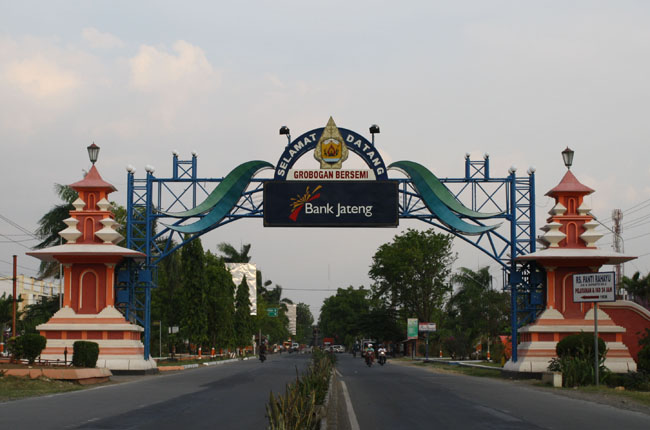
- Welcome to Purwodadi sign

- Coat of arms
- Motto(s): Grobogan Bersemi acronym of Bersih, Sehat, Mantap, Indah (Clean, Healthy, Steady, Beautiful)
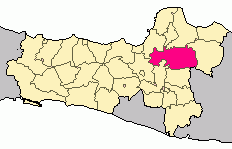
- Location within Central Java

- Location in Java and Indonesia Grobogan Regency (Indonesia)
- Coordinates: 7°01′48″S 110°55′16″E
- Country: Indonesia
- Region: Java
- Province: Central Java
- Founded: 4 March 1726; 300 years ago
- Regency seat: Purwodadi

Government
  - Regent: Setyo Hadi (PDI-P)
  - Vice Regent: Sugeng Prasetyo

Area
  - Total: 2,023.84 km^{2} (781.41 sq mi)

Population (mid 2025 estimate)
  - Total: 1,525,214
  - Density: 753.624/km^{2} (1,951.88/sq mi)

Demographics
  - Ethnic groups: Javanese, Chinese
  - Religion: Islam, Christian, Hindu, Buddhism and traditional Javanese beliefs
  - Languages: Indonesian, Javanese
- Time zone: WIB (UTC+7)
- Postal code: 58110
- Area code: +62 292
- Vehicle registration: K
- Website: grobogan.go.id

Grobogan Regency (Javanese: ꦒꦿꦺꦴꦧꦺꦴꦒ꧀ꦒꦤ꧀) is a regency (Indonesian: kabupaten) located in northeastern part of the Central Java province in Indonesia. Created on 4 March 1726, the Grobogan Regency has an area of 2,023.84 km^{2}, and is the second largest regency in the Central Java Province. It had a population of 1,308,696 at the 2010 census and 1,453,526 at the 2020 census; the official estimate as of mid 2025 was 1,525,214 (comprising 767,149 males and 758,065 females). Its capital is the town of Purwodadi.

== Administrative districts ==
Grobogan is divided into nineteen districts, listed below with their areas and populations at the 2010 census and the 2020 census, together with the official estimates as of mid 2025. The most westerly twelve of these districts (with a combined population of 888,581 at the 2020 census) lie within the officially defined Semarang Metropolitan Area (known as Kedungsepur); the remaining seven districts to the east (indicated by asterisks (*) following their names in the table below) are outside the Semarang Metropolitan Area. The table also includes the locations of the district administrative centres, the number of administrative villages in each district (totaling 273 rural desa and 7 urban kelurahan), and its postal code.

Kode Wilayah	Name of District (kecamatan)	Area in km^{2}	Pop'n 2010 census	Pop'n 2020 census	Pop'n mid 2025 estimate	Admin centre	No. of villages	Post code
33.15.01	Kedungjati	145.29	39,608	43,720	45,615	Kedungjati	12	58167
33.15.02	Karangrayung	144.27	87,457	99,547	106,195	Sumberjosari	19	58163
33.15.03	Penawangan	75.23	57,359	64,148	68,124	Penawangan	20	58161
33.15.04	Toroh	126.72	104,301	116,975	121,763	Sindurejo	16	58171
33.15.05	Geyer *	205.14	60,108	66,164	68,579	Geyer	13	58172
33.15.06	Pulokulon *	136.95	93,501	109,192	114,585	Panunggalan	13	58181
33.15.07	Kradenan *	111.66	74,026	82,396	86,724	Kalisari	14	58182
33.15.08	Gabus *	163.93	67,523	74,103	76,452	Tlogotirto	14	58183
33.15.09	Ngaringan *	119.15	64,101	70,006	72,415	Ngaringan	12	58193
33.15.10	Wirosari *	151.02	83,309	92,757	97,794	Wirosari	14 ^{(a)}	58192
33.15.11	Tawangharjo *	93.06	52,811	58,483	61,264	Pojok	10	58191
33.15.12	Grobogan	101.49	71,265	78,008	82,599	Grobogan	12 ^{(b)}	58152
33.15.13	Purwodadi (town)	78.18	128,452	139,387	144,834	Purwodadi	17 ^{(c)}	58111 - 58114
33.15.14	Brati	56.56	44,779	50,482	53,209	Kronggen	9	58153
33.15.15	Klambu	52.35	33,957	38,554	40,241	Klambu	9	58154
33.15.16	Godong	92.93	76,984	87,028	90,451	Godong	28	58162
33.15.17	Gubug	65.52	74,915	83,725	88,890	Gubug	21	58164
33.15.18	Tegowanu	54.26	50,730	56,793	61,023	Tegowanu Wetan	18	58165
33.15.19	Tanggungharjo	50.13	38,510	42,058	44,457	Tanggungharjo	9	58166
	Totals	2,023.84	1,308,696	1,453,526	1,525,214	Purwodadi	280	

Notes: (a) including the two kelurahan of Wirosari and Kunden. (b) including the kelurahan of Grobogan. (c) including the four kelurahan of Purwodadi, Danyang, Kalongan and Kuripan.

The western part of Grobogan Regency within the defined Semarang Metropolitan Area covers an area of 1,145.58 km^{2} and had a population of 947,401 in mid 2025; the eastern part of the regency (outside the Semarang Metropolitan Area) covers 877.26 km^{2} and had a population of 577,813 in mid 2025.

Bordering Grobogan Regency to the north are the Demak, Pati and Kudus Regencies, to the east is Blora Regency, to the south are the Ngawi (East Java Province), Sragen and Boyolali Regencies and to the west is Semarang Regency. The southwest border of the regency is interrupted by a northward salient formed by Jumangi District of Boyolali Regency. The government of Grobogan Regency is led by a regent, currently Sri Sumarni.

== History ==
Grobogan Regency became the center of the Mataram kingdom with its capital in Medhang Kamulan or Sumedang Purwocarito or Purwodadi. The capital was later moved to around town Prambanan as Mamratipura or Poh Pitu or Watugaluh.

During the time of Medang and Kahuripan, the Grobogan region was important to the country. Later, in the time of Majapahit, Demak, and Pajang, Grobogan was always associated with the folklore of Ki Ageng Sela, Ki Ageng Tarub, Bondan Kejawan, and the story of Aji Saka.

During the Islamic Mataram kingdom, the Grobogan region were included as Mancanegara and had become the co-ordinative area of Regent Nayoko Ponorogo: Adipati Surodiningrat. In the times of War Prangwadanan and War Mangkubumen, the region was a power base of Prince Prangwedana (Raden Mas Said) and Prince Mangkubumi.

The Grobogan region covered the Sukowati area north of Bengawan Solo, Warung, Sela, Kuwu, Teras Karas, Cengkal Sewu, and even to the northern Kedu (Schrieke, II, 1957: 76: 91). The Sukowati area was then partially included in Sragen Regency - Bumi Kejawen, Sukowati, Sukodono, Glagah, Tlawah, Pinggir, Jekawal, and others. Areas such as Repaking, Ngleses, Gubug, South Kedungjati and Kemusu were included in Boyolali Regency.

Meanwhile, the areas which then included in Grobogan Regency were: Purwodadi, Grobogan, Kuwu, sela, Teras Karas, Medang Kamulan, Warung (Wirosari), Wirasaba (Saba), Tarub, Getas, and more.

Later, the provision of the Giyanti Agreement (1755) stated, as a Mancanegara region, Grobogan was included as a Sultanate, with Madiun, half of Pacitan, Magetan, Caruban, Jipang (Bojonegoro), Teras Karas (Ngawen), Sela, Warung (Kuwu-Wirosari). (Sukanto, 1958: 5–6).

Based on the agreement between the GG Daendels with PAA Amangkunegara in Yogyakarta, dated January 10, 1811, it was stipulated that the money that should be paid by the Dutch Government was deleted. Secondly, a part of Kedu (Grobogan area), some areas in Semarang, Demak, Jepara, Salatiga, Grobogan districts, Wirosari, Sesela, Warung, daerah-daerah Jipang, and Japan were submitted to the Dutch Government. And thirdly, areas around Boyolali, Galo, and the district of Cawer Wetan were given to Yogyakarta (Ibid.: 77).

During the Diponegoro War, the areas of Grobogan, Purwodadi, Wirosari, Mangor (?), Demak and Kudus were lost in the fire of war against the Dutch (Sagimun MD, 1960: 32, 331–332).

In 1848–1850, as a result of a famine, the population of Grobogan dropped substantially, from 89,000 in 1848 to only 9,000 in 1850.

== Geography ==
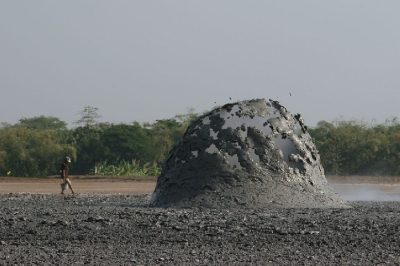
Bledug Kuwu mud volcano, Central Java, Indonesia.

Grobogan is a flat valley lying between two mountains, Pegunungan Kendeng to the south and Pegunungan Kapur Utara to the north. Although the town is known to be very hot during the dry season, Grobogan is one of the main rice producers in Central Java, which mainly supported by several man-made dams, such as Bendungan Klambu, Bendungan Sedadi and Bendungan Kedung Ombo.

The construction of Bendungan Kedung Ombo was a source of national debate due to the social cost of this gigantesque project supported be the World Bank. The two main rivers are Kali Lusi (or Pilang) and Kali Serang. During the rainy seasons, these two rivers cause floods which often destroy the harvests.

== Religion ==
Similar to other regencies in Java, Islam is the dominant religion, with significant presence of Christianity - both Protestant and Catholic, Hindu, and Buddhism. In some places, one can still find traditional beliefs, Aliran kepercayaan and Kejawen. There are two Catholic Parishes, Paroki Purwodadi and Paroki Gubug, which are administered by Semarang Diocese (Keuskupan Agung Semarang).

== Education ==
Most of the schools are public schools. The private educations mainly are provided by the Madrassah, Muhammadiyah, both are Muslim, as well as by Protestant institution and The Union of Teachers of the Republic of Indonesia (PGRI - Persatuan Guru Republic Indonesia). There is almost no higher learning institution in Purwodadi. The senior high school participation is still low (21.19% in 2004) in 58,13 for the junior high school participation.

== Economy ==
Agriculture and public sectors are the main providers of labor market. There is no significant industry, while the mining sectors remain insignificant for the economy of the regions. Many male young people work as seasonal workers in bigger cities like Semarang and Jakarta as construction workers, tricyclists (tukang becak) and other unskilled occupations. While for their female counterparts, they work in manufacture industries. In the recent years, the numbers of female migrant workers have increased significantly with the main destination in Singapore, Malaysia, Hong Kong, and Gulf Countries. There is a possibility of brain drain in Purwodadi, since those who are highly educated tend to find a better and more promising career outside the region or abroad.

The per capita income in 2004 is Rp 611.968,49 (around 70 US$). Formerly known as one of the poorest regencies in Central Java, Grobogan now is the 18 in the economic scale, out of 35 regencies. However, 34.05% of its population in 2004 lived below the poverty line.

== Arts and culture ==
Located between Surakarta (Solo City and Demak), Grobogan has been a strong influence of both the more direct Islam Culture from the Sultane of Demak and more subtle culture of Kingdom of Surakarta (Kasunanan Surakarta). This has been reflected in its traditional arts and performances, such as Shadow Puppet (Wayang Kulit), Javanese Theatre (Kethoprak). Although they almost disappear from the local society, those two forms of performances can still be easily found in different parts of Central Java. Other forms of cultural performances are almost wiped out from the live of Groboganese, such as Angguk, Kentrung, Ledhek/Tayup, Barongan and Reyog. Angguk was performed mainly by a group of young girls aged between 13 and 17 years, doing a marching dance inspired by the different forms of old Dutch army and royal army from Demak and Surakarta. Kentrung is a story telling in a form of songs performed by a man with the accompaniment of a traditional percussion (kendang). The stories were mainly based on the local history or the history of Muhammad. Ledhek/Tayub is a group of Javanese musicians and singer-dancers which was very popular due to their sensual gestures. Apart from the sensual gestures of the dancers, Tayup was/is also famous since they involve/invite the spectators to dance along with them. This kind of participative performance is rare in the Javanese context. Barongan is a Javanese version of Barongsay, the dance of Dragon, where the influence of Chinese culture can be seen from the form of the dragon, the use of the dominance red color. The difference with the Barongsay, Barongan normally presided Reyog, a trance dance. Reyog in Purwodadi was different with the more extravagance Reyog of Ponorogo. In the middle of the trance, some of the dancers could involve the eating of broken glasses and raw skins of rice (brambut).

Other examples of cultural performances were related with the life cycle rites such as Kathaman and Ngantenan. Khataman is a circumcision ceremony in which it is used as a symbol of a young boy's entrance into adulthood. Normally, Kathaman is applied only to Muslim boys. The boy would be dressed with a dress like an Arab Sheikh, and taken by horse from his house to the nearby mosque. This procession is accompanied with Islamic music. Ngantenan is basically the wedding ceremony, which we can see clearly the influence of Hindu culture. Nevertheless, while welcoming the invitee, the bride and groom would be put at the center of the house with brights and colourful costumes including the traditional Javanese costumes, Arabic costumes, and supposed to be modern western costumes with sun-glasses. They can change up to seven costumes within 6 hours.

It is very unfortunate, that most of these tradition has almost all disappeared due to coming of more global and uniformed culture. Kethoprak, Kentrung, Angguk, Barongan and Reyog were used to be the expressions of thanks of the people during the wedding or other important ceremonies. Now they have been replaced either by video-movies, or by Dangdut concerts.

In early 80s, Purwodadi had two cinemas, Bioskop Kencana, located right in the commercial center of the town, and Bioskop Simpang Lima, in the southern part of the town, not so far from Simpang Lima roundabout. Unfortunately, due to the presence of television and video (and now VCD and DVD players), now, both cinemas do not have activities. The outdoor cinema, more known as Layar Tancep, once used to be a source of entertainment in the villages around the town, which the organiser was invited by the village authority for special occasions to the villagers. This type of cinema has also faded away.

=== Cuisine ===
The regency is famous for its Swikee or Sweekee, a soup of frog legs. In fact, Swikee is a Chinese term for the soup, perhaps introduced by the Chinese community in the region. Normally the soup is well accompanied by dark and sweet Soya sauce (Kecap Manis), which is also the specialty of the town. However, the dish is more known by those who live in the city center rather than in villages. The frogs can be found easily during the wet seasons, among the rice fields or in the bank of Lusi river. The poor villagers will tend to sell the frogs in the market. They are rather happy to consume the fresh water crabs (called Yuyu in Javanese which is smaller in size than their cousin from the sea) and fresh water snail (Keong/Besusul). The soup of water crabs (Jangan Yuyu) is normally prepared during the rainy season before the rice harvests. This soup is very rich in taste and has very high protein content. However, this delicacy can not be found in any restaurant but easily found in farmers’ household. The soup of snail (Jangan Keong) is also another delicacy that can not be found in any restaurant in Indonesia, nevertheless, the similar dish can be found in Lisbon, Portugal. The snails are also prepared as brochette/satay (Sate Keong).

== Access and transportation ==
By bus, Purwodadi Bus Terminal (Terminal Simpang Lima) has direct lines to Semarang, Jakarta (Pulogadung, Lebak Bulus, Tanjung Priok, Kampung Rambutan, Pasar Rebo), Bekasi (Pondok Gede), Tangerang (Ciputat, Ciledug), Bogor (Parung), Solo (Tirtonadi), Kudus, Demak, Blora, Pati, Malang (Arjosari), Denpasar, Bali (Ubung), and Surabaya. The train station in the city center was closed in the early eighties, and the main train station now is Ngrombo in Toroh District (+/- 8 km south of Town center), which is the part of DAOP 4 Semarang. The closest airports are A Yani Airport in Semarang (+/- 60 km west of Purwodadi), and Adi Sumarmo International Airport in Solo City (south of Purwodadi).
