= Boyolali Regency =

Regency in Central Java, Indonesia

Boyolali Regency Kabupaten Boyolali
- Regency
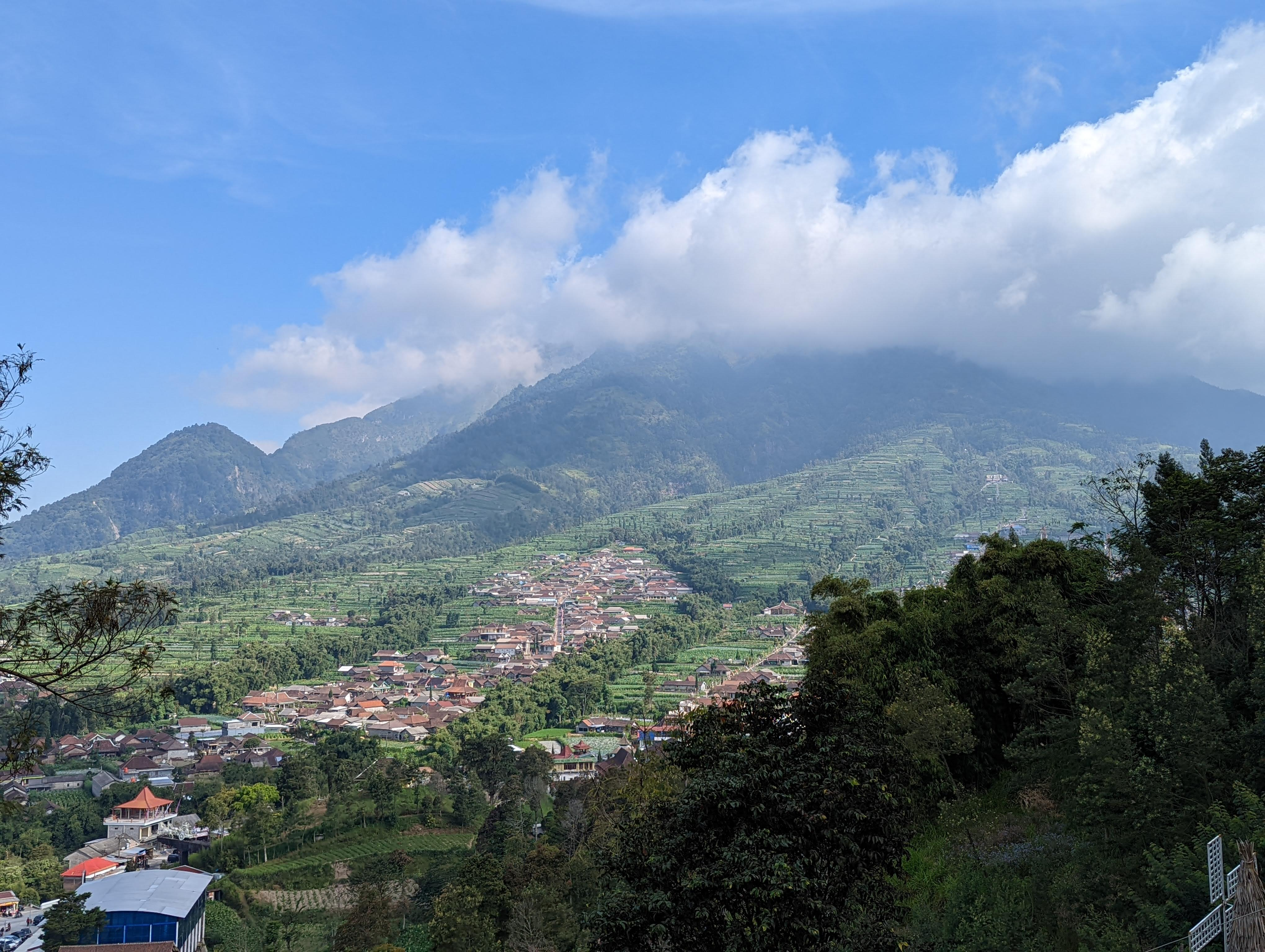
- Village of Selo with view of Mount Merapi

- Coat of arms
- Nickname: Kota Susu (Milk City)
- Motto: Boyolali Tersenyum (Don't Forget to Smile)
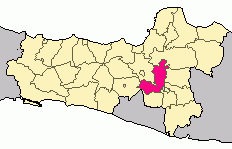
- Location of Boyolali Regency in Central Java
- Coordinates: 7°31′56″S 110°36′9″E
- Country: Indonesia
- Province: Central Java
- Capital: Boyolali

Government
  - Regent: Agus Irawan
  - Vice Regent: Dwi Fajar Nirwana

Area
  - Total: 1,096.61 km^{2} (423.40 sq mi)

Population (mid 2025 estimate)
  - Total: 1,109,332
  - Density: 1,011.60/km^{2} (2,620.04/sq mi)
- Time zone: UTC+7 (WIB)
- Area code: +62 276
- Website: boyolali.go.id

Boyolali (Javanese: ꦧꦺꦴꦪꦭꦭꦶ, romanized: Boyalali, lit. 'Don't forget') is a regency (Indonesian: kabupaten) in the eastern part of Central Java province in Indonesia. It covers an area of 1,096.61 km^{2}, and had a population of 930,531 at the 2010 census and 1,062,713 at the 2020 census; the official estimate as of mid 2025 was 1,109,332 (comprising 552,325 males and 547,525 females in mid 2024). The administrative centre is the town of Boyolali.

== History ==
The anniversary of the founding of Boyolali is celebrated on 5 June, as the government of Kasunanan Surakarta created a new rule about the village government or the government outside the Kuthanegara (Capital City) on 5 June 1847. The rule was adopted pursuant to the treaty of Serat Perjanjian Dalem Natha entered into between Pakubuwono VII and the Dutch Government in the belief that the incumbent government was unable to fully function. The treaty is in the treaty of Serat Perjanjian Dalem Natha page 140 – 146 or in Staatsblad 1847 No. 30. Chapter 30 – 36. According to Staatsblad in 1847 No.30, the Government of Kasunanan Surakarta formed six "Mountain Regencies" in its surrounding area to help the government in those regions. The six regions were the City of Surakarta and the then existent five Regencies of Kartosuro, Klaten, Boyolali, Ampel and Sragen. (Pawarti Surakarta, 1939:71). Based on that Staatsblad, the anniversary of the Boyolali Regency was 5 June 1847.

== Geography and Climate ==
=== Geography ===
The regency is shaped on the map like a back-to-front letter "L", with the Kaliwungu District of Semarang Regency forming an insert at the centre of the regency, immediately to the north of Boyolali town.

The town of Boyolali serves as the administrative heart of the regency, which is also named Boyolali; it lies 27 km to the west of Surakarta. The regency covers a land area of approximately 1,096.6 km^{2}, with the highest point being Mount Merbabu - 3,141 m.

Boyolali is located at the east foothill of Mount Merapi and Mount Merbabu.

Boyolali also has tourist attractions in the form of a natural spring that flows continuously and very clearly, as well as water attractions, swimming pool, fishing pond and restaurants like the Tlatar (about 7 km north of Boyolali town) and in Pengging Banyudono (about 10 km east of the town of Boyolali).

=== Climate ===
Boyolali has a tropical monsoon climate (Am) according to Köppen climate classification. Average temperature varies little from month to month. October is warmest with an average temperature of 25.2 °C. July is coldest with an average temperature of 23.7 °C. The wet season has a rainfall peak around March. The dry season centers around the month of August, which has the most sunshine.

Climate data for Boyolali
Month	Jan	Feb	Mar	Apr	May	Jun	Jul	Aug	Sep	Oct	Nov	Dec	Year
Mean daily maximum °C (°F)	27.8 (82.0)	28.0 (82.4)	28.3 (82.9)	29.2 (84.6)	29.1 (84.4)	29.2 (84.6)	28.9 (84.0)	29.6 (85.3)	30.1 (86.2)	30.3 (86.5)	29.2 (84.6)	28.5 (83.3)	29.0 (84.2)
Daily mean °C (°F)	24.0 (75.2)	24.2 (75.6)	24.3 (75.7)	24.8 (76.6)	24.7 (76.5)	24.2 (75.6)	23.7 (74.7)	24.0 (75.2)	24.8 (76.6)	25.2 (77.4)	24.8 (76.6)	24.4 (75.9)	24.4 (76.0)
Mean daily minimum °C (°F)	20.3 (68.5)	20.4 (68.7)	20.4 (68.7)	20.5 (68.9)	20.3 (68.5)	19.3 (66.7)	18.5 (65.3)	18.5 (65.3)	19.5 (67.1)	20.2 (68.4)	20.4 (68.7)	20.3 (68.5)	19.9 (67.8)
Average rainfall mm (inches)	350 (13.8)	333 (13.1)	357 (14.1)	269 (10.6)	182 (7.2)	100 (3.9)	57 (2.2)	46 (1.8)	54 (2.1)	132 (5.2)	255 (10.0)	313 (12.3)	2,448 (96.3)
Source: Climate-Data.org

== Places of interest ==
1. Mount Merapi, the most active volcano in Indonesia. Can be reached through Selo district.
2. Umbul Tlatar, natural spring pool located 7 km to the north of Boyolali.
3. Umbul Pengging, natural spring pool at Banyudono district.
4. Kedung Ombo Dam, mainly used for irrigation purposes.
5. Woodball Course Tlatar, woodball arena inside Umbul Tlatar area.

== Adjacent areas ==
Boyolali Regency is surrounded by other regencies: Klaten Regency and Yogyakarta province in the south; Sukoharjo, Karanganyar and Sragen regencies and Solo city in the east; Semarang Regency and Grobogan Regency in the north; and Magelang Regency in the west.

== Administrative districts ==
At the time of the 2010 census, Boyolali Regency comprised nineteen districts (kecamatan), but subsequently three additional districts (Gladagsari, Tamansari and Wonosamodro) were created by splitting off parts of existing districts. The twenty-two districts are tabulated below with their areas and their populations at the 2010 census and the 2020 census, together with the official estimates as at mid 2025. The table also gives the location of the district administrative centres, the number of villages in each district (totaling 261 rural desa and 6 urban kelurahan), and the district post codes.

Kode Wilayah	Name of District (kecamatan)	Area in km^{2}	Pop'n 2010 census	Pop'n 2020 census	Pop'n mid 2025 estimate	Admin centre	No. of villages	Post codes
33.09.01	Selo	60.28	28,407	30,052	30,216	Samiran	10	57363
33.09.02	Ampel	31.69	75,664	40,796	41,901	Candi	10	57352 ^{(a)}
33.09.20	Gladagsari	62.87	^{(b)}	42,634	43,682	Gladagsari	10	57352
33.09.03	Cepogo	55.75	54,303	60,083	61,736	Mliwis	15	57362
33.09.04	Musuk	34.68	54,859	32,039	33,076	Musuk	10	57331
33.09.21	Tamansari	42.81	^{(c)}	28,923	29,695	Karangkendal	10	57331
33.09.05	Boyolali (town)	29.11	65,860	72,948	74,993	Banaran	9 ^{(d)}	57311: 57316
33.09.06	Mojosongo	45.81	50,606	59,356	62,735	Mojosongo	13 ^{(e)}	57321: 57323
33.09.07	Teras	31.41	43,020	51,486	54,950	Mojolegi	13	57372
33.09.08	Sawit	18.71	29,733	32,280	32,865	Kemasan	12	57374
33.09.09	Banyudono	27.52	47,590	53,088	54,764	Jembungan	15	57373
Totals	South and West Sector	440.64	450,042	503,685	520,613		127	
33.09.10	Sambi	50.39	41,328	47,311	49,420	Sambi	16	57376
33.09.11	Ngemplak	39.69	81,211	96,254	102,247	Sawahan	12	57375
33.09.12	Nogosari	55.69	63,287	72,409	75,617	Glonggong	13	57378
33.09.13	Simo	51.36	44,070	49,740	51,602	Simo	13	57377
33.09.14	Karanggede	46.78	37,723	45,870	49,334	Kebonan	16	57381 ^{(f)}
33.09.15	Klego	56.35	39,296	47,773	51,376	Klego	13	57385
33.09.16	Andong	56.26	53,570	61,023	63,591	Kacangan	16	57384
33.09.17	Kemusu	84.70	39,306	34,456	35,714	Klewar	10	57383
33.09.18	Wonosegoro	57.57	49,076	38,274	40,465	Wonosegoro	11	57382
33.09.22	Wonosamodro	61.02	^{(g)}	30,606	32,907	Garangan	10	57382
33.09.19	Juwangi	96.13	31,622	35,312	36,446	Juwangi	10 ^{(h)}	57391
Totals	North Sector	655.94	480,489	559,028	588,719		140	
	Totals	1,096.61	930,531	1,062,713	1,109,332	Boyolali	267	

Notes: (a) except the desa of Sidomulyo (which has a post code of 57316).
(b) the 2010 population is included with the figure for Ampel District, from which the western part was cut out.
(c) the 2010 population is included with the figure for Musuk District, from which the southern part was cut out.
(d) including 3 kelurahan - Banaran, Pulisen and Siswodipuran. (e) including 2 kelurahan - Mojosongo and Kemiri.
(f) except the desa of Tegalsari (which has a post code of 57311).
(g) the 2010 population is included with the figure for Wonosegoro District, from which the western part was cut out;
the same alteration also moved part of Kemusu District into Wonosegoro District.
(h) including one kelurahan - Sambeng. Note that Ngleses desa is an exclave, separated by Kemusu District from the rest of Juwangi District.

== Transportation ==
- Intercity buses
- Dokar, two-wheel carriage powered by horse
- Pedicab (Indonesian: Becak)
- Angkota, minibus
