= Kebumen =

Kebumen may refer to:

- Kebumen (town)
- Kebumen Regency
