= Chandradimuka Stadium =

Stadium in Central Java, Indonesia

Stadion Chandradimuka
- Location in Kebumen Regency
- Location: Arumbinang Street, Dukuh, Kebumen, Kebumen Regency, Central Java, Indonesia
- Coordinates: 7°40′02.4″S 109°39′59.6″E
- Owner: Persak Kebumen
- Operator: Government of Kebumen Regency
- Capacity: 10,000
- Surface: Grass

Construction
- Groundbreaking: Unknown
- Opened: 1992
- Renovated: 2012

Tenant
- Persak Kebumen

Chandradimuka Stadium is a football stadium located in Dukuh, Kebumen, Kebumen Regency, Central Java, Indonesia. It is the home stadium of Persak Kebumen and can hold around 10,000 spectators. The stadium is also used for local community activities.

== See also ==
- List of stadiums in Indonesia
