= Sempor =

Sempor ꦱꦺꦩ꧀ꦥꦺꦴꦂ Sèmpor
- District
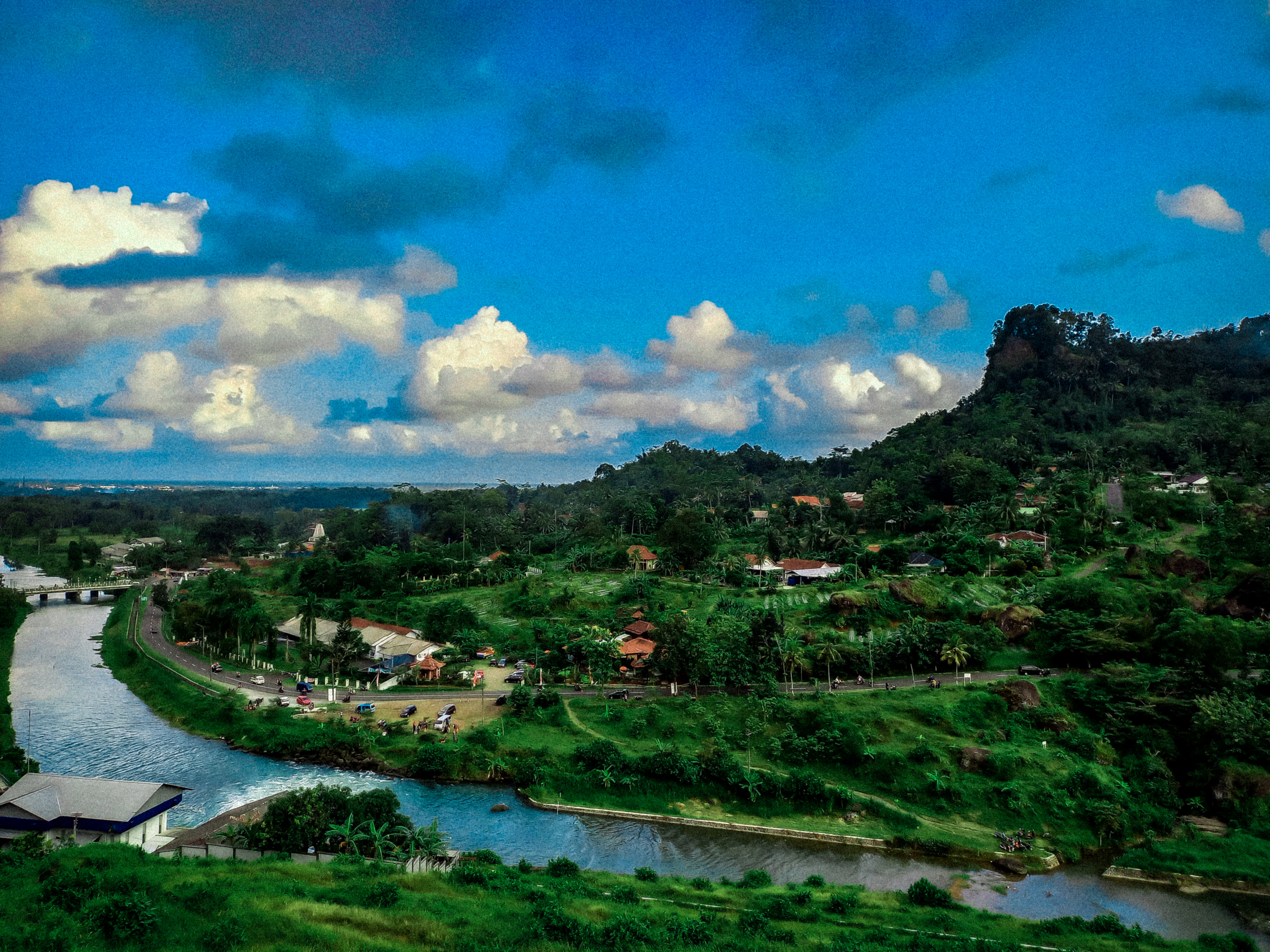
- Settlement within Tunjungseto village of Sempor, south of the Sempor Reservoir

- Location within Java Location within Indonesia
- Coordinates: 7°33′38″S 109°30′36″E
- Country: Indonesia
- Provinces: Central Java
- Regency: Kebumen

Area
  - Total: 138.4 km^{2} (53.4 sq mi)
- Elevation: 140 m (460 ft)

Population (mid 2024 estimate)
  - Total: 71,379
  - Density: 515.7/km^{2} (1,336/sq mi)
- Ministry of Home Affairs Code: 33.05.18

Sempor (Javanese: ꦱꦺꦩ꧀ꦥꦺꦴꦂ, romanized: Sèmpor) is a district (kecamatan) of Kebumen Regency, Central Java, Indonesia. Sempor District is approximately 29 km northwest of Kebumen town, the regency's capital. It borders Mandiraja District to the north, Karanggayam and Karanganyar Districts to the east, Gombong and Buayan Districts to the south, and Rowokele District to the west.

As of 2010, Sempor District had a population of 58,418; the official estimate as at mid 2024 was 71,379. Sempor District consists of 16 villages, 74 rukun warga, and 368 rukun tetangga. The administrative center of Sempor District is Jatinegara Village.

== Geography ==
Sempor District is situated inside a valley within the South Serayu Mountains. The Sempor Reservoir is located in the center of the district.

== Climate ==
Sempor has a tropical rainforest climate (Af) with abundant rainfall year-round. It receives the most precipitation in January, and the least in August. A summary of the annual temperature fluctuation and rainfall can be seen below:

Climate data for Sempor
Month	Jan	Feb	Mar	Apr	May	Jun	Jul	Aug	Sep	Oct	Nov	Dec	Year
Mean daily maximum °C (°F)	27.7 (81.9)	27.8 (82.0)	27.9 (82.2)	28 (82)	27.9 (82.2)	27.3 (81.1)	26.9 (80.4)	27.3 (81.1)	28.1 (82.6)	28.4 (83.1)	27.8 (82.0)	27.5 (81.5)	27.7 (81.8)
Daily mean °C (°F)	24.5 (76.1)	24.5 (76.1)	24.7 (76.5)	24.8 (76.6)	24.6 (76.3)	24 (75)	23.4 (74.1)	23.3 (73.9)	24 (75)	24.6 (76.3)	24.7 (76.5)	24.5 (76.1)	24.3 (75.7)
Mean daily minimum °C (°F)	22.1 (71.8)	22.2 (72.0)	22.2 (72.0)	22.3 (72.1)	21.9 (71.4)	21.1 (70.0)	20.4 (68.7)	20.1 (68.2)	21 (70)	21.9 (71.4)	22.4 (72.3)	22.3 (72.1)	21.7 (71.0)
Average rainfall mm (inches)	403 (15.9)	348 (13.7)	319 (12.6)	258 (10.2)	148 (5.8)	108 (4.3)	83 (3.3)	63 (2.5)	102 (4.0)	219 (8.6)	367 (14.4)	387 (15.2)	2,805 (110.5)
Source: Climate-Data.org

== Administrative divisions ==
Sempor is divided into the following 16 villages, all classed as rural desa:

- Bejiruyung
- Bonosari
- Donorojo
- Jatinegoro
- Kalibeji
- Kedungjati
- Kedungwringin
- Kenteng
- Pekuncen
- Sampang
- Selokerto
- Semali
- Sempor
- Sidoharum
- Somagede
- Tunjungseto

== Education ==
There are a total of 50 schools spread out across all the villages under Sempor. A breakdown of the 50 schools are shown in the table below:

Type	Number	
Type	Public	Private
Primary schools (SD)	39	1
Junior High Schools (SMP)	3	3
Madrasah Ibtidaiyah (MI)	N/A	3
Madrasah Tsanawiyah (MTs)	N/A	1

== See also ==
- Sempor Dam
