= Sempor Dam =

- Interactive map of Sempor Dam
- Country: Indonesia
- Location: District Gombong, Kebumen, Central Java Province
- Coordinates: 7°33′59.78″S 109°29′10.12″E
- Purpose: Power, water supply, flood control, recreation
- Status: Operational
- Construction began: 1967
- Opening date: 1978; 48 years ago

Dam and spillways
- Type of dam: Embankment, rock-fill
- Impounds: Sempor River
- Height: 58 m (190 ft)

Reservoir
- Total capacity: 56,900,000 m^{3} (46,100 acre⋅ft)
- Surface area: 43 km^{2} (17 mi^{2})

Power Station
- Commission date: 1978
- Turbines: 1 × 1 MW Francis-type
- Installed capacity: 1 MW
- Location of Sempor dam, Central Java

Sempor Dam (Indonesian: Waduk Sempor, Javanese: ꦮꦝꦸꦏ꧀ꦱꦺꦩ꧀ꦥꦺꦴꦂ, romanized: Wadhuk Sémpor) is an embankment dam on the Sempor River in District Gombong, Kebumen, Central Java Province, Republic of Indonesia. In addition to being a tourist attraction Sempor Dam is a source of irrigation water for farmers. It helps irrigate thousands of paddy fields in the delta. It also provides for flood control and has a 1 MW hydroelectric power station at its base. Construction on the dam started in 1967 but in the same year water from flash floods over-topped it, causing the dam to fail on 29 November 1967. The wave of water killed 160 people in three towns, including Magelang. and delivered widespread damage to the area. Construction later restarted on the dam and it was completed in 1978. Its power station was later commissioned in 1980.
