= Kebumen (town) =

City and capital of Kebumen Regency, Indonesia

- Town

Ngapak transcription(s)
  - Javanese: ꦏꦼꦧꦸꦩꦺꦤ꧀
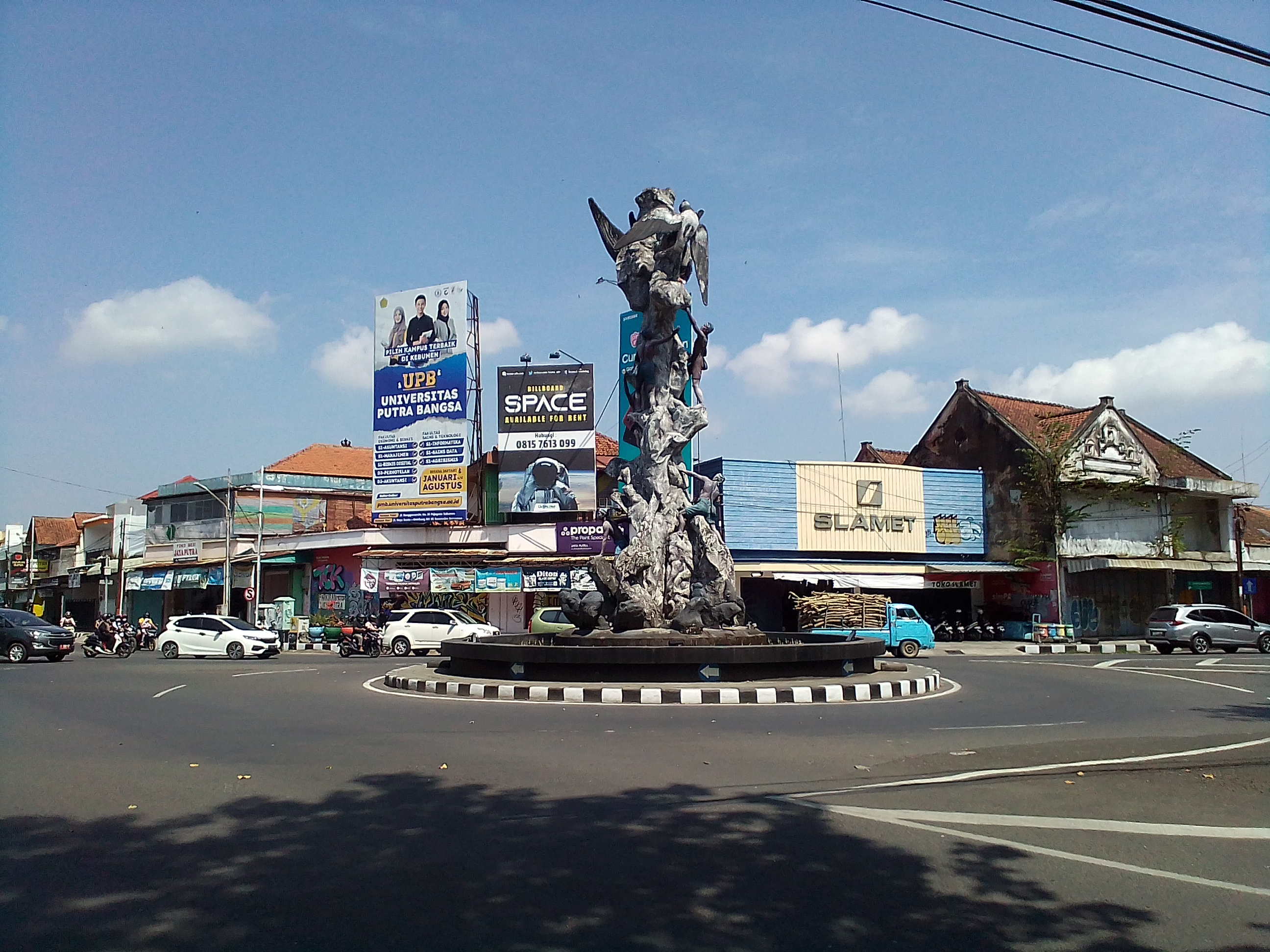
- Motto: Kebumen Beriman; (Bersih, Indah, Manfaat, Aman, Nyaman); (Clean, Lovely, Useful, Safe, Comfortable)
- Location within Kebumen Regency Location within Java Location within Indonesia
- Coordinates: 7°40′15.3″S 109°39′39.0″E
- Country: Indonesia
- Province: Central Java
- Regency: Kebumen
- Founded: 21 August 1629
- Incorporated: 1950

Area
  - Total: 42.04 km^{2} (16.23 sq mi)
- Elevation: +85 m (279 ft)

Population (mid-2024 estimate)
  - Total: 135,374
  - Density: 3,220/km^{2} (8,340/sq mi)

Demographics
  - Ethnic groups: Javanese; Chinese; Arabs; Sundanese; Melanesians
- Time zone: UTC+7 (Indonesia Western Standard Time)
- Postal code: 54311
- Area code: (+62) 287
- Vehicle registration: AA
- Languages: Indonesia; Javanese; Chinese; English (by the expat community); Many other Indonesian languages
- Villages: 29
- Website: www.kebumenkab.go.id

Kebumen is a town on the island of Java, Indonesia and is the administrative centre of Kebumen Regency, in Central Java Province. It is also the name of the main town of the district of Kebumen. The population of the town at the 2010 Census was 118,847, while the 2020 Census gave a total of 131,750; the official estimate as of mid-2024 was 135,374. Kebumen has other names – "Swallow City", "City of Tours", and "the city of culture".

== Geography ==
Kebumen is located near the Indian Ocean; it is also called Samudera Indonesia. The town is bisected by the Kali Lukulo (Lukulo River). It lies near three major roads: Jalan Pahlawan, Jalan HM. Sarbini and Jalan Ronggowarsito. Its geographic location is 7°40′15.3″S 109°39′39.0″E.

=== Climate ===
Kebumen has a tropical rainforest climate (Af) with moderate rainfall from June to September and heavy to very heavy rainfall from November to May.

Climate data for Kebumen
Month	Jan	Feb	Mar	Apr	May	Jun	Jul	Aug	Sep	Oct	Nov	Dec	Year
Mean daily maximum °C (°F)	31.6 (88.9)	31.9 (89.4)	31.9 (89.4)	31.7 (89.1)	31.1 (88.0)	30.5 (86.9)	30.0 (86.0)	30.3 (86.5)	30.7 (87.3)	31.1 (88.0)	31.0 (87.8)	31.1 (88.0)	31.1 (87.9)
Daily mean °C (°F)	27.0 (80.6)	27.2 (81.0)	27.3 (81.1)	27.2 (81.0)	26.6 (79.9)	25.5 (77.9)	24.6 (76.3)	25.0 (77.0)	25.6 (78.1)	26.1 (79.0)	26.7 (80.1)	26.8 (80.2)	26.3 (79.4)
Mean daily minimum °C (°F)	22.4 (72.3)	22.5 (72.5)	22.7 (72.9)	22.7 (72.9)	22.1 (71.8)	20.6 (69.1)	19.3 (66.7)	19.7 (67.5)	20.5 (68.9)	21.2 (70.2)	22.4 (72.3)	22.5 (72.5)	21.6 (70.8)
Average rainfall mm (inches)	371 (14.6)	329 (13.0)	360 (14.2)	257 (10.1)	213 (8.4)	113 (4.4)	96 (3.8)	100 (3.9)	82 (3.2)	287 (11.3)	419 (16.5)	395 (15.6)	3,022 (119)
Source: Climate-Data.org

== Demographics ==
The population is almost entirely Javanese and over 96% Muslim. The town of Kebumen has a multi-religious population.

== Economy ==
The agricultural sector has quite a dominant role in the economy of Kebumen, contributing 44.77 percent to the GDP. The mainstay of this region's agricultural commodities is food crops, especially rice, cassava, soybean, and coconut plantations. The tourism sector of Kebumen is equally crucial to the local economy.

== Leaders ==
The name of Tumenggung/Adipati (Duke)/Bupati (Regent) who led Kebumen
No.	Name	Year	Area Name
1	Panembahan Bodronolo	1642–1657	Panjer
2	Hastrosuto	1657–1677	Panjer
3	Kalapaking I	1677–1710	Panjer
4	KRT. Kalapaking II	1710–1751	Panjer
5	KRT. Kalapaking III	1751–1790	Panjer
6	KRT. Kalapaking IV	1790–1833	Panjer
7	KRT. Arungbinang IV	1833–1861	Panjer
8	KRT. Arungbinang V	1861–1890	Keboemen
9	KRT. Arungbinang VI	1890–1908	Keboemen
10	KRT. Arungbinang VII	1908–1934	Keboemen
11	KRT. Arungbinang VIII	1934–1942	Keboemen
12	R. Prawotosoedibyo S	1942–1945	Keboemen
13	KRT. Said Prawirosastro	1945–1947	Keboemen
14	RM. Soedjono	1947–1948	Kebumen
15	R.M. Istikno Sosrobusono	1948–1951	Kebumen
16	R.M. Slamet Projorahardjo	1951–1956	Kebumen
17	R. Projosudarto	1956–1961	Kebumen
18	R. Sudarmo Sumohardjo	1961–1963	Kebumen
19	R.M. Suharjo Notoprojo	1963–1964	Kebumen
20	DRS. R. Soetarjo Kolopaking	1964–1966	Kebumen
21	R. Suyitno	1966–1968	Kebumen
22	Mashud Mertosugondo	1968–1974	Kebumen
23	R. Soepeno Soerjodiprodjo	1974–1979	Kebumen
24	DRS. H. Dadiyono Yudoprayitno	1979–1984	Kebumen
25	Drs. Iswarto	1984–1985	Kebumen
26	H. M.C. Tohir	1985–1990	Kebumen
27	H.M. Amin Soedibyo	1990–1995	Kebumen
28	H.M. Amin Soedibyo	1995–2000	Kebumen
29	Dra. Rustriningsih, M.Si	2000–2005	Kebumen
30	Dra. Rustriningsih, M.Si	2005–2008	Kebumen
31	K.H. Nashiruddin Al Mansyur	2008–2010	Kebumen
32	H. Buyar Winarso, SE	2010–2015	Kebumen
33	Ir. H. Yahya Fuad, SE	2016–2018	Kebumen
34	K. H. Yazid Mahfudz	2019–2020	Kebumen

== University / College ==
- Nahdlatul Ulama Ma'arif University
- Dharma Patria Polytechnic
- Nahdlatul Ulama Islamic Institute (previous name STAINU Kebumen)
- Sebelas Maret University Campus VI PGSD Kebumen
- Putra Bangsa Institute of Economic Science
- Academy of Information and Computer Management PGRI
- Muhammadiyah Institute of Technology

== Mass media ==
Kebumen has relatively complete mass media, both print and electronic media. Currently, the Kebumen region has a daily newspaper, "Kebumen Express", which is part of Jawa Pos Group.

For electronic media, there are several commercial radio stations, one Kebumen district government-owned public radio, and a local television station.

=== Radio ===
Radio on FM:

- Bimasakti FM
- Mas FM
- Radio DVK
- Ardana FM

=== Television ===
- Ratih TV Kebumen (47 UHF), Kebumen government-owned television

== Sports ==
=== Football ===
Kebumen Regency also has a football team, under the name Persak Kebumen, which stands for the Indonesian Football Association of Kebumen. This team in the 2008-2011 period competed in the Indonesian Third Division. Persak Kebumen played in the 2014-2015 period in the Nusantara League competition. After the return of the Indonesian League, Persak Kebumen played in Liga 3 in 2019. Chandradimuka Stadium is the home venue of Persak Kebumen.

=== Futsal ===
In addition to football clubs, Kebumen Regency has a professional futsal club, namely SKN FC Kebumen. SKN FC Kebumen has played in the Indonesia Pro Futsal League since 2018 as runner-up. The competition that followed was the 2018 AFF Futsal Championship, where they were a semifinalist.

== People ==
- Sutoyo Siswomiharjo, a Hero of the Revolution in Indonesia.

== See also ==
- Persak Kebumen
- SKN FC Kebumen
