= Persak Kebumen =

Indonesian football club

- Full name: Persatuan Sepakbola Kebumen
- Nicknames: Walet Emas (The Golden Swallows)
- Founded: 1967; 59 years ago
- Ground: Chandradimuka Stadium
- Capacity: 10,000
- Owner: SKN Group
- Chairman: HM Tursino
- Manager: Muhammad Faukhan Al Hasani
- Coach: Uphy Hi Aziz
- League: Liga 4
- 2024–25: Quarter-final (Central Java zone)
| Home colours | Away colours | Third colours |

Persatuan Sepakbola Kebumen, commonly known as Persak, is an Indonesian football club based in Kebumen Regency, Central Java. They currently compete in the Liga 4.

== History ==
Persak Kebumen was founded in 1967 at the wish of the people of Kebumen who wanted a football club in the Kebumen Regency area that could compete in the official Indonesia football competition. In 2008, they started playing in Liga 3 Central Java zone. The club is supported by Bumi Mania. After several years of inactivity, they returned in the Liga 3 Central Java zone 2015. In May 2014, president of Persipasi Bekasi MK Yulianto, tried to revive Persak Kebumen again. In 2015, Persak Kebumen new management brought in coach Sartono Anwar.

== Season-by-season records ==
| Season(s) | League/Division | Tms. | Pos. | Piala Indonesia |
|---|---|---|---|---|
| 2014 | Liga Nusantara | 16 | eliminated in provincial phase | – |
| 2015 | Liga Nusantara | season abandoned | | – |
| 2016 | ISC Liga Nusantara | 32 | eliminated in provincial phase | – |
| 2017 | | | | |
2018
| 2019 | Liga 3 | 32 | eliminated in provincial phase | – |
| 2020 | Liga 3 | season abandoned | | – |
| 2021–22 | Liga 3 | 64 | 3rd, second round | – |
| 2022–23 | Liga 3 | season abandoned | | – |
| 2023–24 | | | | |
| 2024–25 | Liga 4 | 64 | eliminated in provincial phase | – |
| 2025–26 | Liga 4 | 64 | TBD | – |

== Stadium ==
Persak Kebumen play their home matches at the 10,000 capacity Chandradimuka Stadium (part of Chandradimuka Sport Complex), located at the Jalan Arumbinang, Dukuh, Kebumen. The stadium is equipped with a football pitch and athletic track.
