= Nahdlatul Ulama Islamic Institute =

Private university in Kebumen, Indonesia

Nahdlatul Ulama Islamic Institute of Kebumen.
- Institut Agama Islam Nahdlatul Ulama Kebumen
- Motto: Centre of Excellence of Islamic Studies
- Motto in English: Centre of Excellence of Islamic Studies
- Type: Private
- Established: 1987
- Affiliations: UMNU Kebumen
- Rector: Dr. H. Imam Satibi. M.Pd.I
- Faculty: 61 Lecturer of 4 faculties
- Location: Tentara Pelajar Street 55B (Panjer), Kebumen Regency, Central Java, 54312, Indonesia; 7.673722°S 109.671667°E
- Colors: Green
- Nickname: IAINU Kebumen
- Website: http://www.iainu-kebumen.ac.id
- Location in Kebumen Regency

The Nahdlatul Ulama Islamic Institute (abbreviated IAINU) is a private university in the city of Kebumen, Central Java, Indonesia. The university is located in Panjer an area of Kebumen, Central Java.

IAINU has four faculties and graduate programs: faculty of syariah, ushuluddin and da'wah, faculty of Islamic economics and business, faculty of tarbiyah and graduate programs

== Faculties ==
The university have four faculties and graduate program:

- Faculty of Syariah, Ushuluddin and Da'wah
- Faculty of Islamic Economics and Business
- Faculty of Tarbiyah
- Graduate Programs
