= Kebumen Regency =

Regency in Central Java, Indonesia

Kebumen Regency Kabupaten Kebumen
- Regency
- Regency of Kebumen

Other scripts transcription(s)
  - Javanese: ꦏꦼꦧꦸꦩꦺꦤ꧀
  - Kawi: 𑼒𑽀𑼨𑼸𑼪𑼾𑼥𑽁
  - Pegon: كبومن
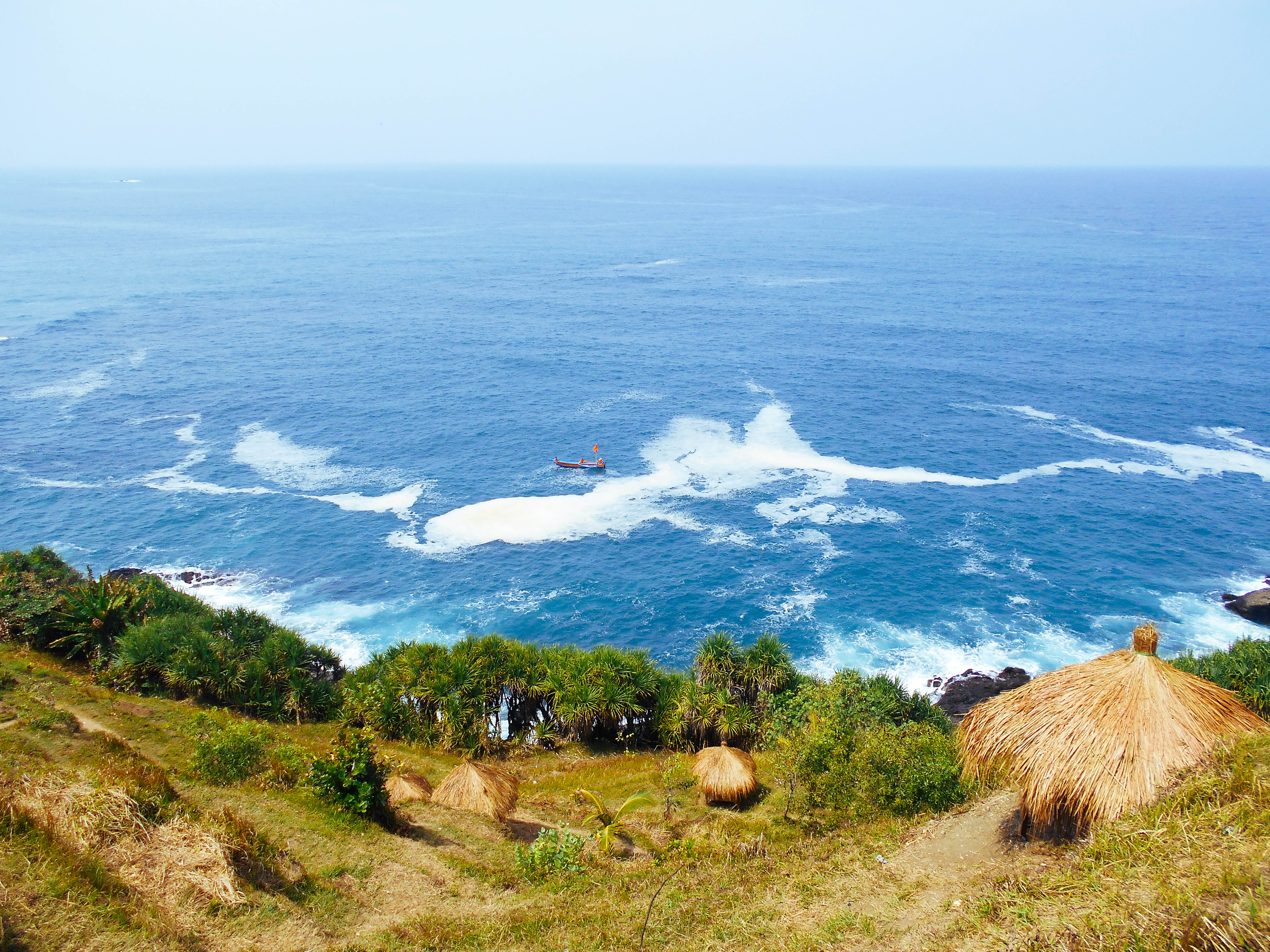
- Menganti Beach

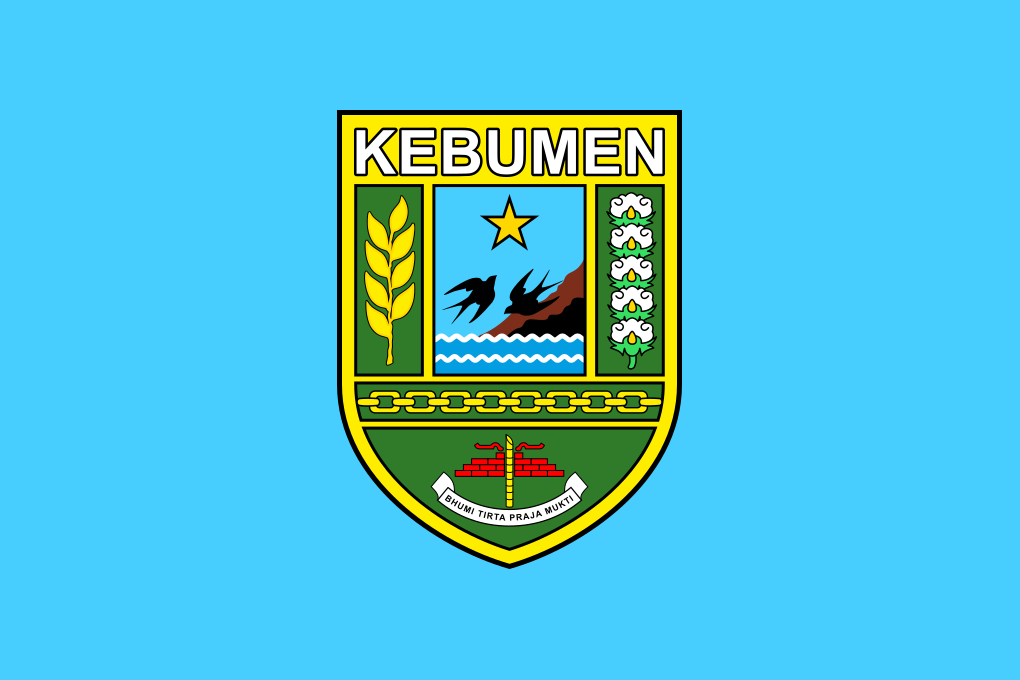
- Flag Seal
- Nickname: Kota Lawet
- Motto(s): Bhumi Tirta Praja Mukti; The land and water are for the welfare of the nation and state
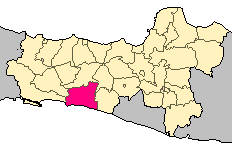
- Location within Central Java

- Location in Java and Indonesia Kebumen Regency (Indonesia)
- Coordinates: 7°37′46″S 109°34′14″E
- Country: Indonesia
- Province: Central Java
- Anniversary: August 21, 1629; 397 years ago
- Regency seat: Kebumen

Government
  - Type: Regency government
  - Regent: Lilis Nuryani
  - Vice Regent: Zaeni Miftah
  - Regional Secretary: Edi Rianto
  - Chair of Regional House of Representatives: H. Saman Halim Nurrohman

Area
  - Total: 1,281.12 km^{2} (494.64 sq mi)
- Elevation: 29 m (95 ft)

Population (mid 2025)
  - Total: 1,453,417
  - Density: 1,134.49/km^{2} (2,938.31/sq mi)
- Demonym: Kebumenese
- Time zone: UTC+7 (Western Indonesia Time)
- Postal codes: 543xx–544xx
- Area code: +62 287
- Vehicle registration: AA
- Languages: Indonesian; Javanese (Banyumasan and Kedu varieties)
- HDI: ▲72.48 (2024); High
- Regional budget: Rp 3,173,041,187,318 (2025)
- Website: www.kebumenkab.go.id

Kebumen Regency (Javanese script: ꦏꦼꦧꦸꦩꦺꦤ꧀, Kawi script: 𑼒𑽀𑼨𑼸𑼪𑼾𑼥𑽁, Pegon: كبومن) is a regency in the southern part of Central Java, Indonesia. Its regency seat is Kebumen. The regency borders Banjarnegara Regency to the north, Wonosobo Regency and Purworejo Regency to the east, the Indian Ocean to the south, and Cilacap Regency and Banyumas Regency to the west.

Kebumen covers an area of 1,281.12 km² and had a population of 1,453,417 in mid 2025. The regency is known for its southern coastline, karst landscapes, caves, geological heritage, and the Karangsambung–Karangbolong Geopark, which forms part of the Kebumen UNESCO Global Geopark.

== Geography ==
Kebumen Regency lies in southern Central Java between 7°27′–7°50′ South latitude and 109°33′–109°50′ East longitude. It is bounded by Banjarnegara Regency to the north, Purworejo and Wonosobo regencies to the east, the Indian Ocean to the south, and Cilacap and Banyumas regencies to the west.

The regency has an area of 1,281.12 km². Its elevation ranges from 9 metres to 198 metres above sea level, with an average regency elevation of 29 metres. Administratively, Kebumen consists of 26 districts. The largest district by area is Karanggayam, covering 109.29 km² or 8.53% of the regency, while the smallest is Gombong, covering 19.48 km² or 1.52%.

Southern Kebumen consists mainly of lowland and coastal areas facing the Indian Ocean, while the northern part is dominated by hills and mountains associated with the South Serayu range. In 2024, village-potential data recorded 30 coastal villages or urban villages and 430 non-coastal villages or urban villages in the regency.

=== Geology and landscape ===
Kebumen contains important geological areas extending from Karangsambung in the north to the Karangbolong–South Gombong karst region in the south. Karangsambung was designated a Geological Nature Reserve by Minister of Energy and Mineral Resources Decree No. 2817 K/40/MEM/2006. The Gombong Karst Landscape Area was designated by Ministerial Decree No. 3043 K/40/MEM/2014, later amended by Ministerial Decree No. 3873 K/40/MEM/2014.

The Karangsambung–Karangbolong area was later developed as a geopark. The Kebumen Regency tourism office records 41 geosites, 2 biosites, and 14 cultural sites spread across 118 villages in 12 districts. UNESCO lists Kebumen as a UNESCO Global Geopark and describes Karangsambung as a natural laboratory containing continental-edge and oceanic rocks that record plate-tectonic processes.

=== Land use and climate ===
In 2024, Kebumen had 40,139.55 hectares of wet-rice fields. Of these, 25,794.20 hectares were irrigated rice fields, 14,306.35 hectares were rain-fed rice fields, 38.00 hectares were tidal-swamp fields, and 1.00 hectare was lowland-swamp field.

Non-rice agricultural land covered 52,837.08 hectares. The largest uses were dry fields or gardens, state forest, community forest, and ponds. Non-agricultural land covered 35,134.87 hectares.

BPS climate data from the Sempor station show variable rainfall in 2024. The highest monthly rainfall was recorded in January at 742 mm, while the lowest was recorded in August at 3 mm.

== History ==
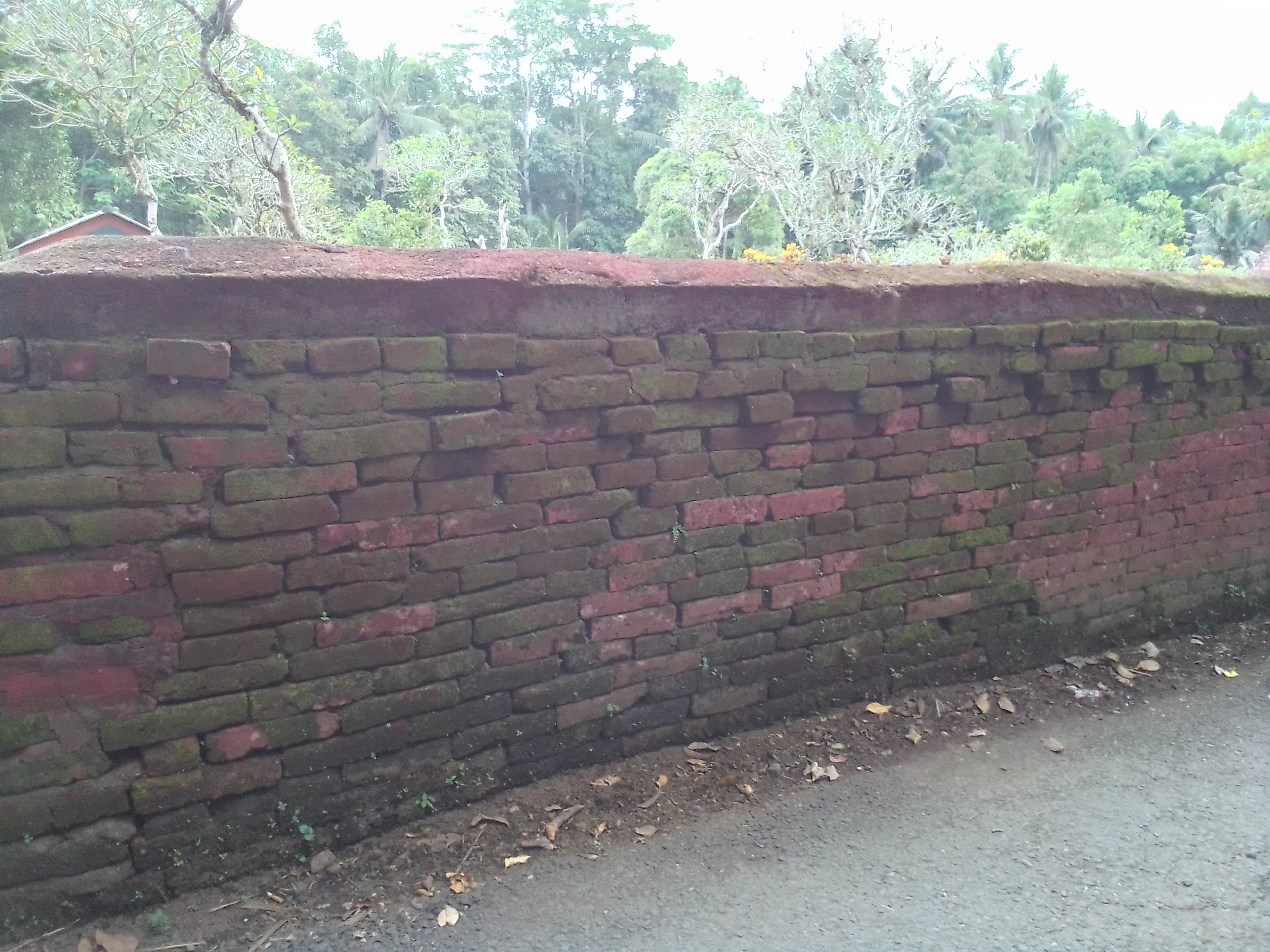
Large brick remains at the former Wonoyudo site in Mirit District.

The area now forming Kebumen Regency has archaeological and cultural traces that predate the modern regency. Megalithic and ancient Hindu artefacts have been recorded in several places, including lingga-yoni remains in Ayah and Sumberadi, Ganesha statues in Kejawang and Kebumen, and the Talangpati site in Pujotirto, Karangsambung. A study by Hindarto and Ansori describes Talangpati as a transitional megalithic-Hindu site in Kalipuru hamlet, Pujotirto village, Karangsambung District, while noting that its archaeological status still requires further study.

In local historical tradition, the area was formerly known as Panjer. The Kebumen Regency government links the early history of Kebumen with the Mataram Sultanate and the role of Ki Bodronolo in supplying logistics for Sultan Agung's campaign against Batavia in 1629. Through Regional Regulation No. 3 of 2018, Kebumen Regency set 21 August 1629 as its official anniversary.

The name Kebumen is traditionally associated with the term kabumian, meaning the residence of Kyai Bumi or Prince Bumidirja. According to local history recorded by the regency government, Prince Bumidirja withdrew from Mataram during the reign of Sunan Amangkurat I, and the area of his residence became known as Kabumian, later Kebumen.

During the colonial period, the area underwent several administrative changes. After the end of the Java War in 1830, Bagelen came under Dutch colonial administration, and Kebumen later became one of the regencies in the Bagelen Residency. The local tourism office states that the name "Kebumen" or "Keboemen" began to be used for the western coastal part of Bagelen after the Java War, replacing Panjer in colonial administration.

In 1901, the Bagelen Residency was abolished and its territory was incorporated into the Kedu Residency. At that time, Kebumen also became the name of an afdeeling covering Kebumen Regency and Karanganyar Regency, with its centre in Kebumen district.

=== Merger of Karanganyar Regency ===
Before 1936, Karanganyar was a separate regency in what is now western Kebumen. A study by Teguh Hindarto describes Karanganyar as an independent regency from 1832 to 1936. Its abolition was associated with the impact of the 1930s economic depression on the Dutch East Indies bureaucracy.

According to the Karanganyar District government, several regencies were abolished on 31 December 1935, including Karanganyar, which was merged into Kebumen Regency. From 1 January 1936, Karanganyar ceased to exist as a separate regency and later became a district within Kebumen Regency.

=== Republican period ===
After Indonesian independence, Kebumen's status as a regency within Central Java was confirmed by Law No. 13 of 1950 concerning the establishment of regencies in Central Java Province.

== Emblem ==
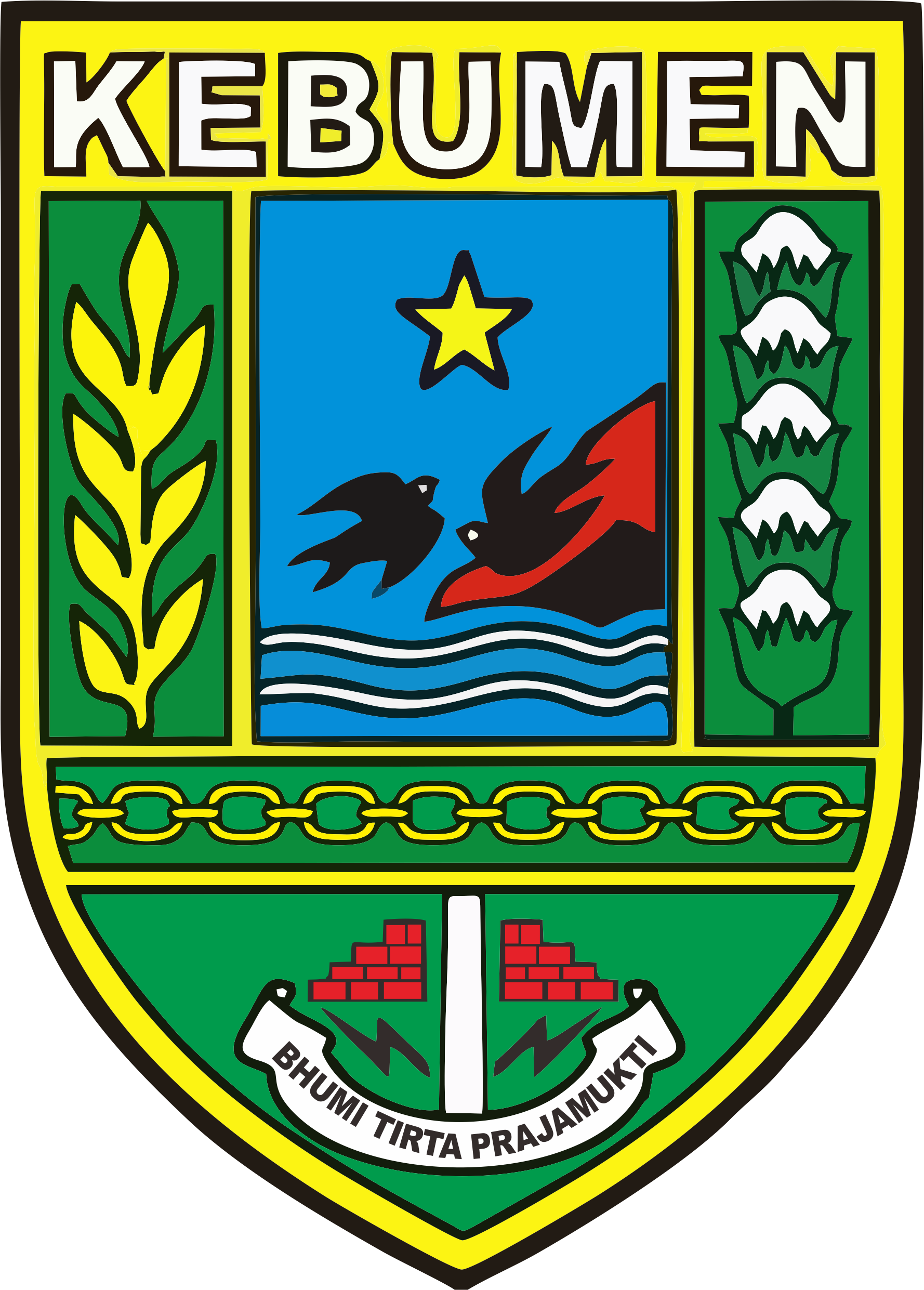
The emblem of Kebumen Regency under Regional Regulation No. 6 of 2022.

The emblem of Kebumen Regency is regulated by Regional Regulation No. 6 of 2022 concerning the regional emblem. The regulation replaced the previous 1970 regulations on the form and use of the regency emblem.

The emblem is a shield with a 4:3 ratio. Its elements include a five-pointed star, mountains, a cave, the sea, two swiftlet birds, rice and cotton, a chain, a bamboo spear, bricks, roof tiles, the word "KEBUMEN", and the motto "Bhumi Tirta Praja Mukti".

The shield symbolizes the people's resolve and readiness to defend the Republic of Indonesia. The golden star represents belief in God Almighty. The mountains refer to the hilly and mountainous parts of the regency, while the cave and sea represent Kebumen's karst, cave, and southern coastal landscapes.

The two swiftlets symbolize perseverance, agility, harmony, balance, and concord. The eight rice grains represent the month of Indonesian independence and the month of Kebumen's anniversary, while the five cotton flowers represent the five principles of Pancasila. The seventeen chain links symbolize the date of Indonesian independence, and the nine-segment bamboo spear represents the spirit of struggle in defending independence.

The red bricks and roof tiles represent brick and tile industries, which are among the traditional livelihoods of Kebumen communities. The sixteen bricks, two roof tiles, and nine bamboo segments are interpreted as the year of Kebumen's anniversary, while the waves above and below the emblem together total twenty-one, representing the date of the anniversary.

The motto Bhumi Tirta Praja Mukti means that land and water are sources of welfare for society, the nation, and the state.

== Government ==
Kebumen Regency is led by a regent and vice regent. Since 20 February 2025, the regent has been Lilis Nuryani, with Zaeni Miftah as vice regent, for the 2025–2030 term.

=== Administrative divisions ===
Kebumen Regency comprises twenty-six districts (kecamatan), tabulated below with their areas and their populations at the 2010 Census and the 2020 Census, together with the official estimates as at mid 2025. At the next level of administration there are 460 urban villages (kelurahan) and rural villages (desa), further divided into 1,965 hamlets, 1,952 neighbourhood associations, and 7,288 community units. The table also includes the locations of the district administrative centres, the number of administrative villages in each district (totaling 449 rural desa and 11 urban kelurahan), and its post code.

Kode Wilayah	Name of District (kecamatan)	Area in km^{2}	Pop'n 2010 Census	Pop'n 2020 Census	Pop'n mid 2025 Estimate	Admin centre	No. of villages	Post code
33.05.01	Ayah	76.37	53,970	63,886	69,010	Demangsari	18	54473
33.05.02	Buayan	68.42	53,466	64,643	70,588	Buayan	20	54474
33.05.03	Puring	61.97	51,986	62,788	68,029	Sitiadi	23	54383
33.05.04	Petanahan	44.84	51,951	59,724	64,517	Petanahan	21	54382
33.05.05	Klirong	43.25	53,445	63,305	68,071	Klirong	24	54381
33.05.06	Buluspesantren	48.77	51,524	58,175	62,958	Setropenar	21	54391
33.05.07	Ambal	62.41	54,050	61,901	67,152	Ambalresmi	32	54392
33.05.08	Mirit	52.35	43,367	51,524	57,415	Mirit	22	54396
33.05.23	Bonorowo	20.91	18,289	20,962	22,990	Boborowo	11	54395
33.05.09	Prembun	22.96	25,984	28,478	30,540	Prembun	13	54397
33.05.24	Padureso	28.95	13,146	16,347	17,774	Padureso	9	54394
33.05.10	Kutowinangun	33.73	41,619	47,518	50,910	Kutowinangun	19	54393
33.05.11	Alian	57.75	53,343	65,776	72,127	Krakal	16	54352
33.05.25	Poncowarno	27.37	14,717	18,044	19,999	Poncowarno	11	54390
33.05.12	Kebumen (town)	42.04	118,847	131,749	137,649	Kebumen	29 ^{(a)}	54311: 54317
33.05.13	Pejagoan	34.58	47,264	54,834	58,439	Pejagoan	13	54361
33.05.14	Sruweng	43.68	52,747	60,779	65,167	Sruweng	21	54362
33.05.15	Adimulyo	43.43	33,669	37,152	39,452	Adimulyo	23	54363
33.05.16	Kuwarasan	33.84	43,389	50,157	53,937	Kuwarasan	22	54366
33.05.17	Rowokele	53.79	41,766	50,295	54,457	Rowokele	11	54472
33.05.18	Sempor	100.15	58,418	68,121	73,850	Sempor	16	54421
33.05.19	Gombong	19.48	46,732	50,196	50,787	Gombong	14 ^{(b)}	54411: 54416
33.05.20	Karanganyar	31.40	33,548	38,575	38,325	Karanganyar	11 ^{(c)}	54364
33.05.21	Karanggayam	109.29	47,801	57,993	63,517	Karanggayam	19	54365
33.05.22	Sadang	54.23	17,899	22,294	24,363	Sadang	7	54354
33.05.26	Karangsambung	65.15	36,989	46,528	51,144	Karangsambung	14	54353
	Totals	1,281.12	1,159,926	1,350,438	1,453,417	Kebumen	460	

Notes: (a) comprising 5 kelurahan (Bumirejo, Kebumen, Panjer, Selang and Tamanwinangun) and 24 desa. (b) including 2 kelurahan (Gombong and Wonokriyo).
(c) comprising 4 kelurahan (Jatiluhur, Karanganyar, Panjatan and Plarangan) and 7 desa.

=== Regional House of Representatives ===
The Regional House of Representatives of Kebumen Regency has 50 members from the 2024 legislative election. The parties with the largest number of seats are the Indonesian Democratic Party of Struggle and the National Awakening Party, with 11 seats each.

Composition of the Regional House of Representatives of Kebumen Regency, 2024
Political party	Seats
Indonesian Democratic Party of Struggle	11
National Awakening Party	11
NasDem Party	8
Gerindra Party	7
United Development Party	4
Golkar	3
National Mandate Party	3
Prosperous Justice Party	2
Democratic Party (Indonesia)	1
Total	50

== Demographics ==
According to Statistics Indonesia, Kebumen Regency had a population of 1,453,417 in mid 2025, consisting of 736,988 males and 716,429 females. The annual population growth rate for 2020–2025 was 0.75%, with a population density of 1,134.5 people per km² and a sex ratio of 103.

The most populous district was Kebumen District, with 137,649 people in 2025, or 9.47% of the regency's population. The least populous district was Padureso, with 17,774 people or 1.22%. Kebumen District was also the most densely populated, with 3,274 people per km^{2}, while Sadang had the lowest density, at 449 people per km^{2}.

By age group, 311,229 people, or about 22.00% of the population, were aged 0–14. The working-age population aged 15–64 numbered 966,460, or about 68.31%. People aged 65 and over numbered 137,065, or about 9.69%. The largest five-year age group was 25–29, with 115,504 people.

=== Employment ===
In 2024, the population aged 15 and over numbered 1,106,025. Of these, 855,785 were in the labour force, consisting of 812,379 employed people and 43,406 openly unemployed people. The labour-force participation rate was 77.37%, while the open unemployment rate was 5.07%.

By main employment sector, the largest number of working residents were employed in services, with 321,815 people. Agriculture employed 292,506 people, while manufacturing employed 198,058 people.

== Education ==
Education in Kebumen Regency includes primary, secondary, religious, special-needs, and higher education. BPS education data cover schools under both the Ministry of Education, Culture, Research, and Technology and the Ministry of Religious Affairs.

In the 2024/2025 academic year, Kebumen had 746 elementary schools, 112 junior high schools, 23 senior high schools, and 65 vocational high schools under the Ministry of Education, Culture, Research, and Technology. Under the Ministry of Religious Affairs, in the 2023/2024 academic year there were 115 Raudatul Athfal, 117 Madrasah Ibtidaiyah, 91 Madrasah Tsanawiyah, and 27 Madrasah Aliyah.

In 2024, BPS recorded six private higher-education institutions in Kebumen under the Ministry of Education, Culture, Research, and Technology, with 283 lecturers and 7,379 students. These institutions were located in Kutowinangun, Kebumen, Pejagoan, and Gombong districts. There was also one private higher-education institution under the Ministry of Religious Affairs in Kebumen District, with 72 lecturers and 949 students.

== Transportation ==
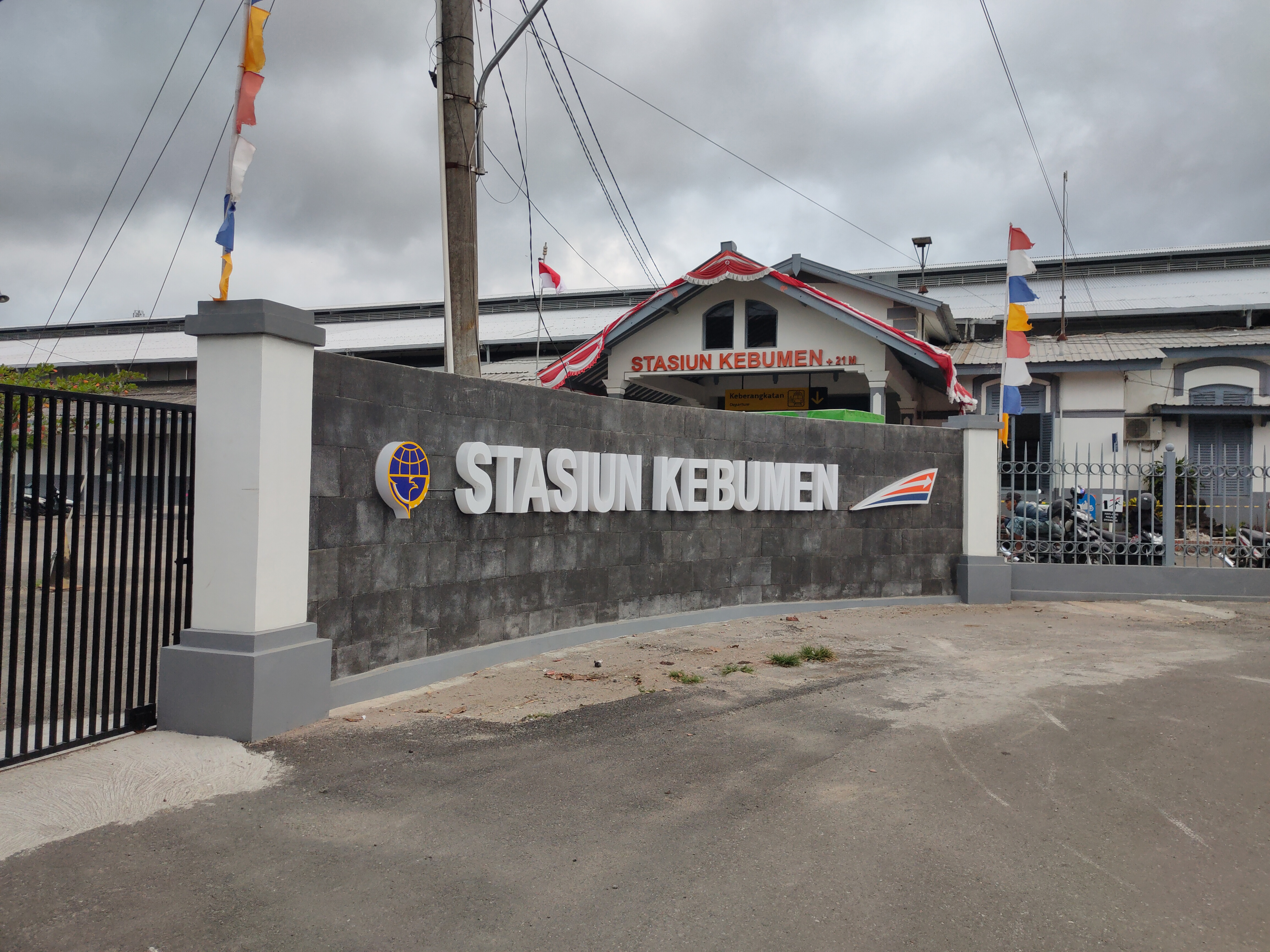
Kebumen Station after renovation and the operation of the double track.

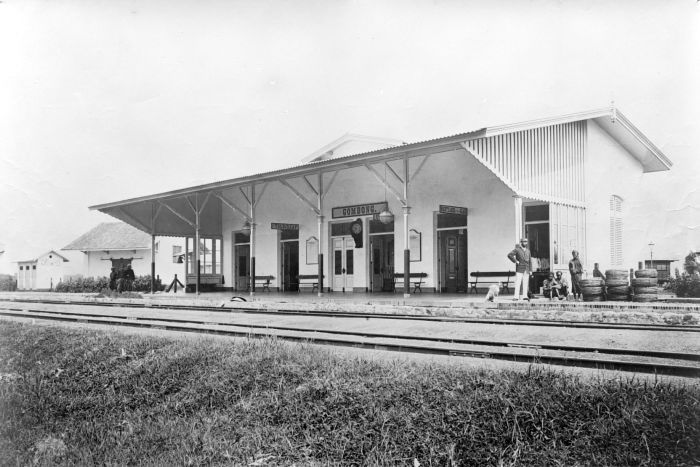
Gombong Station during the Dutch East Indies period, c. 1890–1900.

Kebumen Regency is served by land transport networks consisting of national roads, provincial roads, regency roads, public transport services, passenger terminals, and the southern Java railway line. Its position between Banyumas–Cilacap to the west and Purworejo–Yogyakarta to the east makes it one of the main transport corridors on the southern coast of Central Java.

=== Roads ===
In 2024, Kebumen had 1,157.09 km of roads, consisting of 92.36 km of national roads, 47.58 km of provincial roads, and 1,017.15 km of regency roads.

The main national-road corridor in the regency lies on the southern route of Central Java. The regency government identifies the Banyumas–Prembun national road and the Southern Cross Road Network as important routes for long-distance traffic and holiday travel.

=== Railways ===
Kebumen is crossed by the southern Java railway line on the Kroya–Kutoarjo segment. The route forms part of the rail corridor connecting West Java, southern Central Java, the Special Region of Yogyakarta, and East Java. The Directorate General of Railways previously built the approximately 76 km Kroya–Kutoarjo double track as part of the development of the southern Java railway line.

The main station in the regency is Kebumen railway station, which is located near the regency centre and is part of Operation Area V Purwokerto. Other passenger stations include Gombong railway station, Karanganyar railway station, Kutowinangun railway station, and Prembun railway station. The regency also has Ijo, Sruweng, and Wonosari stations supporting railway operations on the southern line.

== Tourism ==
Tourism in Kebumen Regency is centred on the southern coast, karst landscapes, caves, reservoirs, hot springs, geological sites, and colonial-era heritage buildings. The Central Java tourism office lists attractions in Kebumen including Jatijajar Cave, Petruk Cave, Menganti Beach, Suwuk Beach, Karangbolong Beach, Ayah Beach, Petanahan Beach, Sempor Reservoir, Wadaslintang Reservoir, Krakal Hot Spring, Pentulu Indah Hill, and Fort Van der Wijck.

Tourist attractions in Kebumen Regency

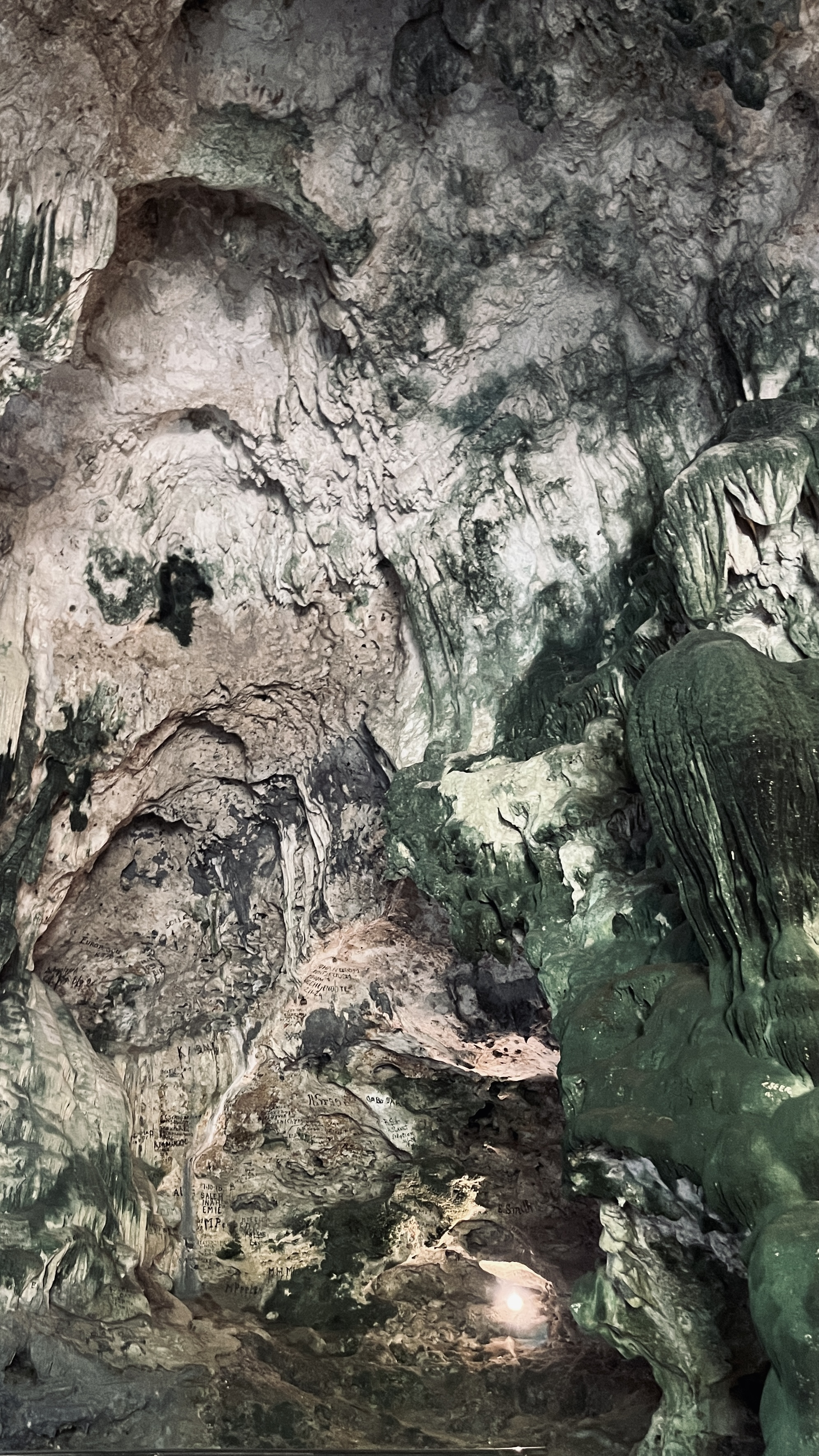
Jatijajar Cave

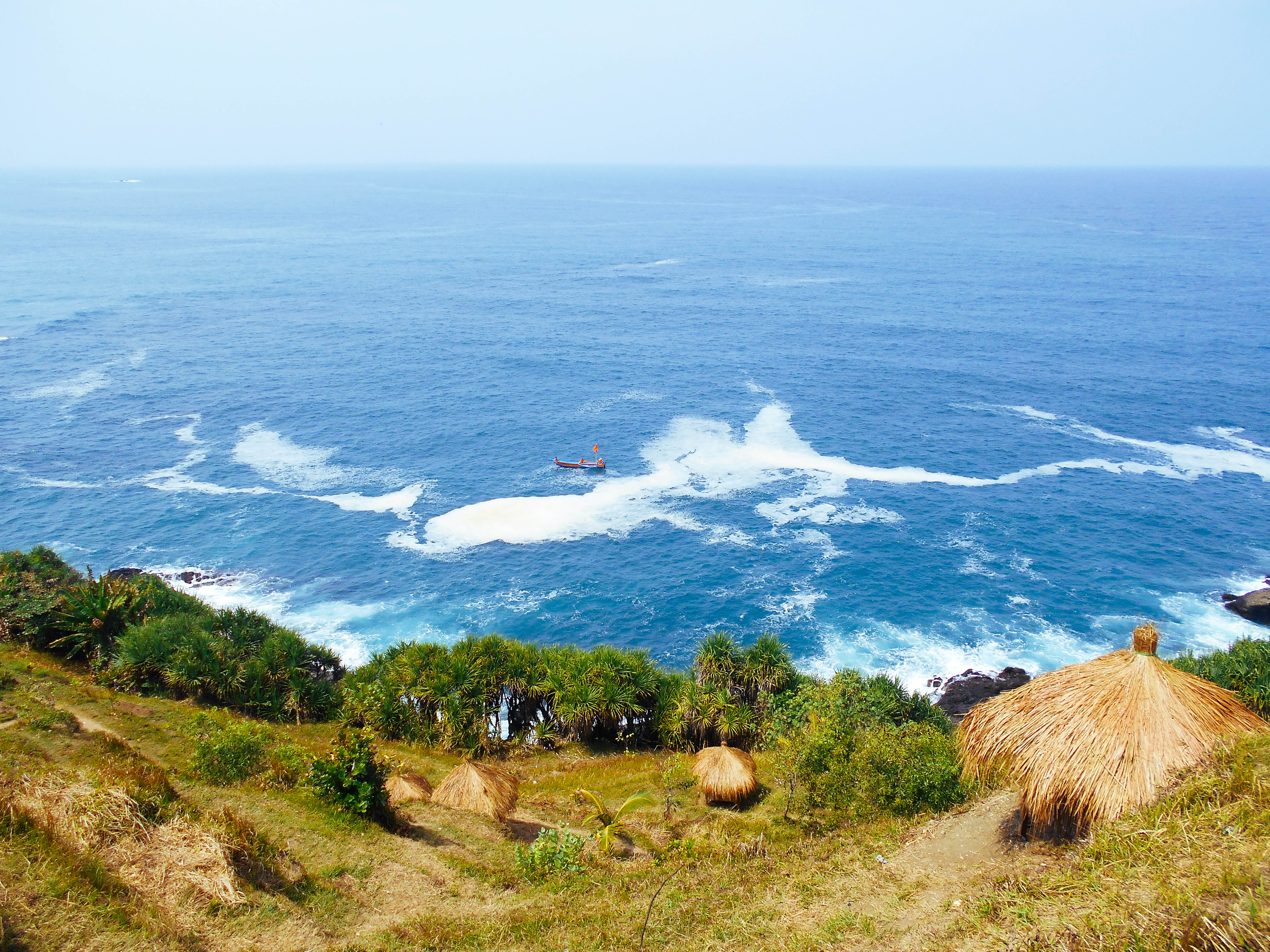
Menganti Beach

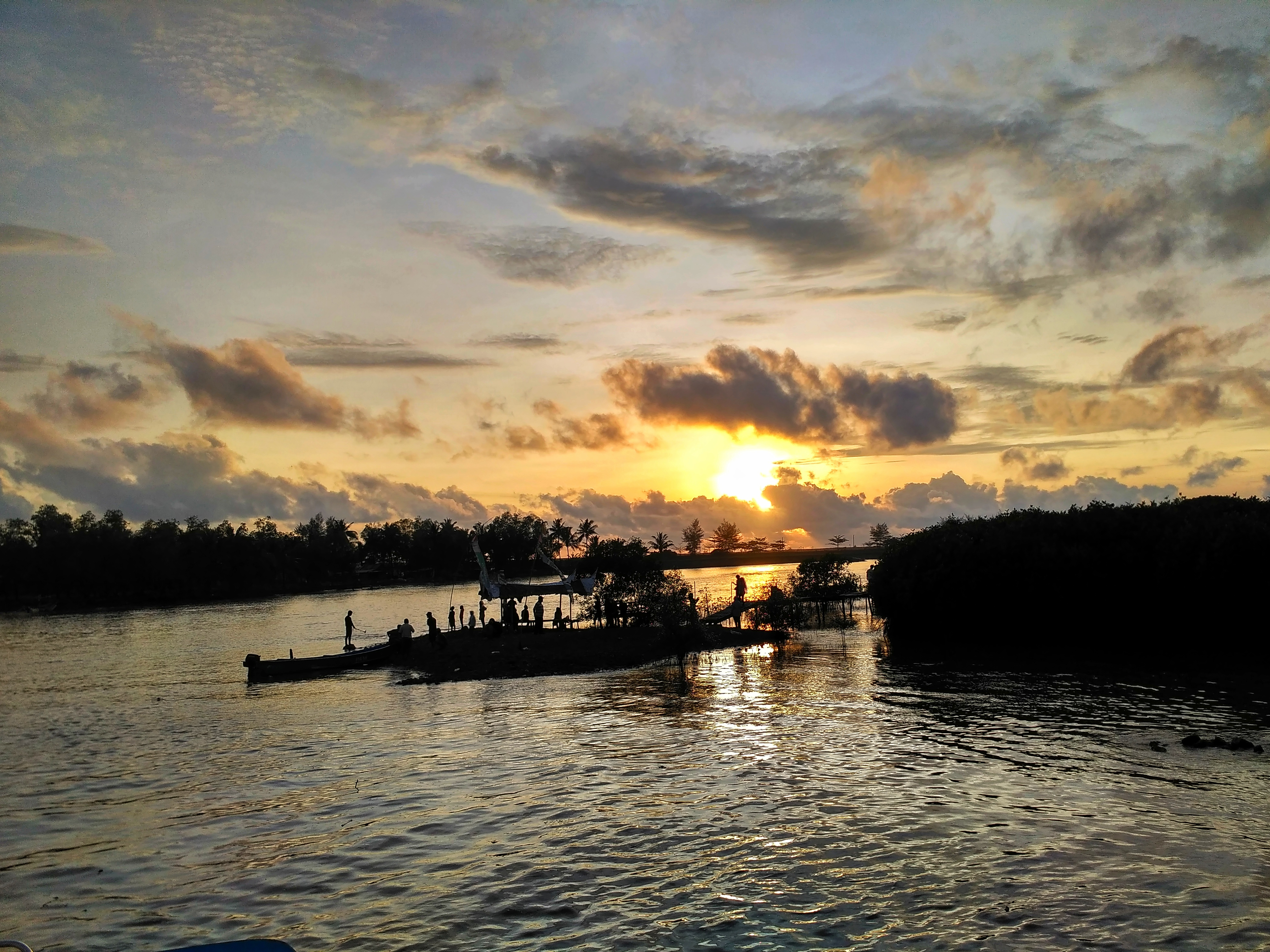
Logending Beach or Ayah Beach

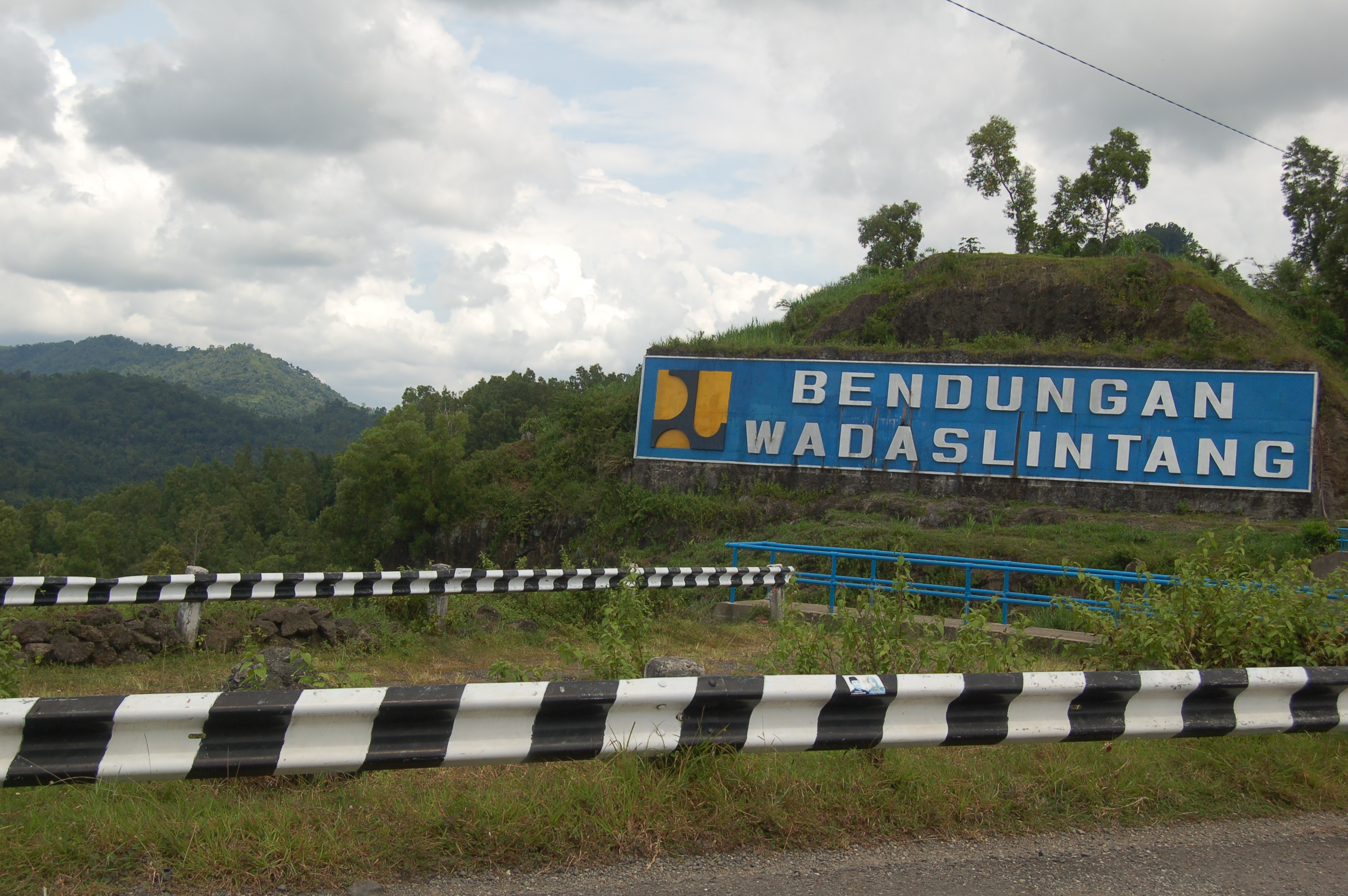
Wadaslintang Reservoir

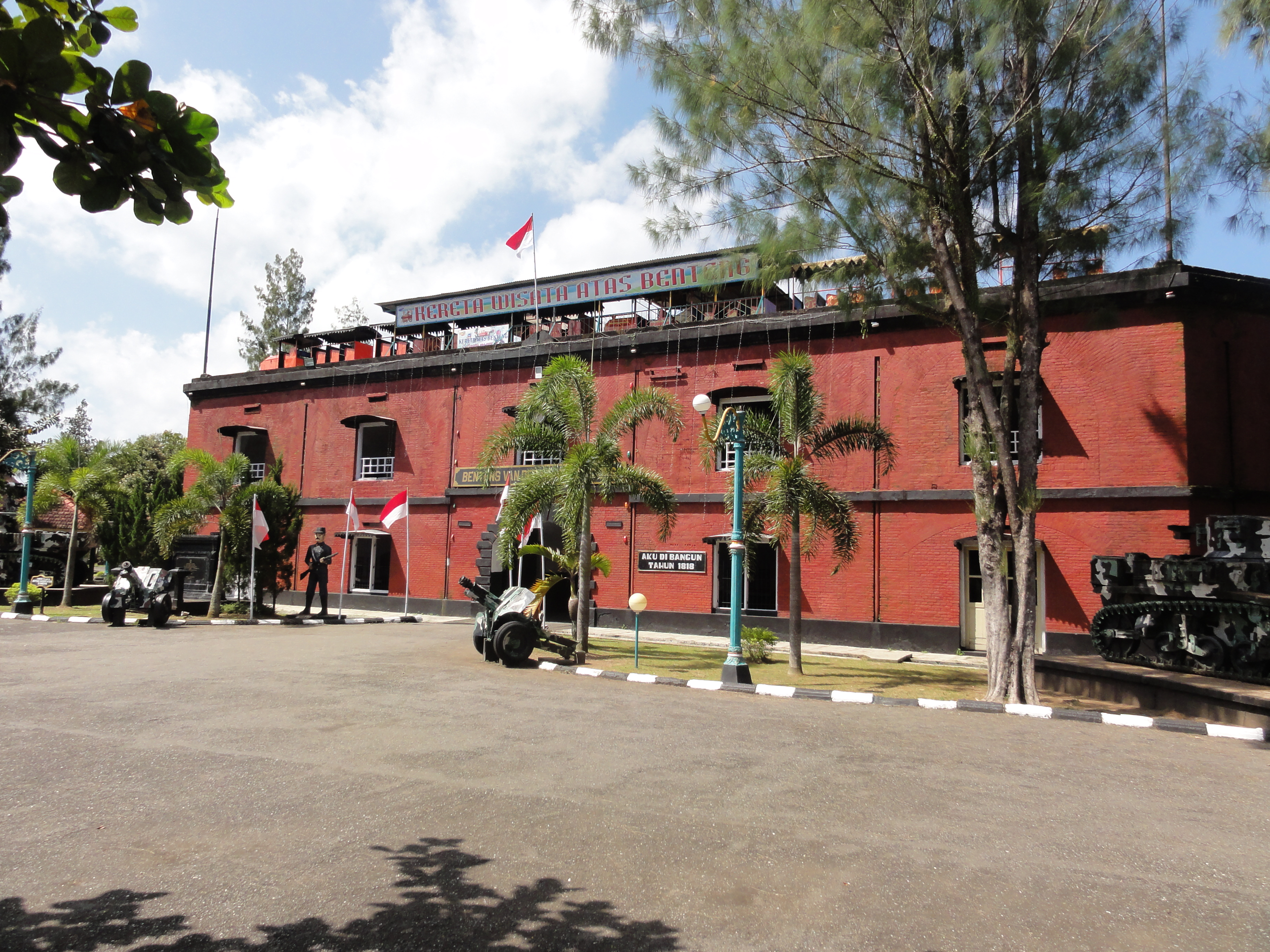
Fort Van der Wijck

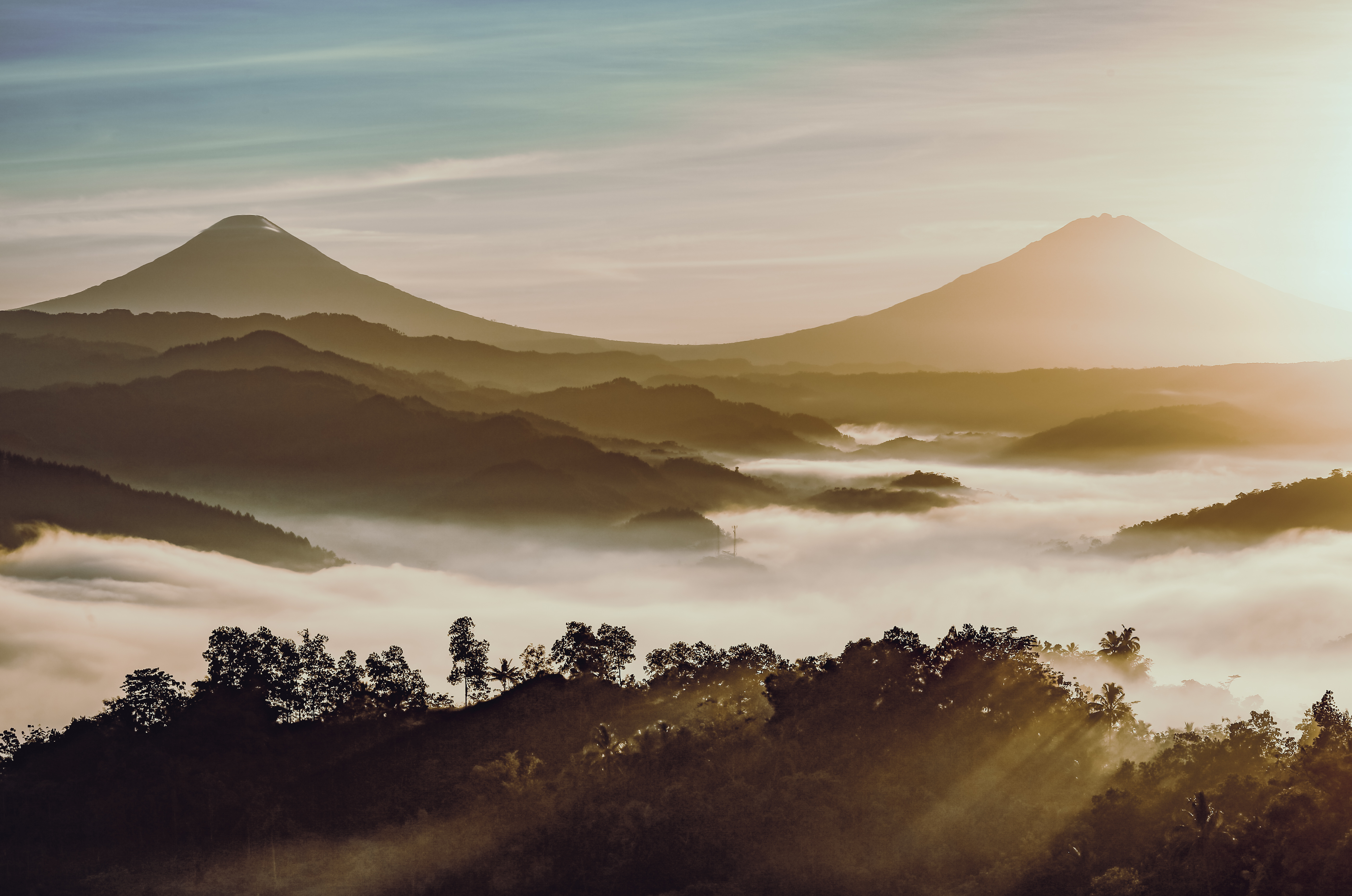
Pentulu Indah Hill

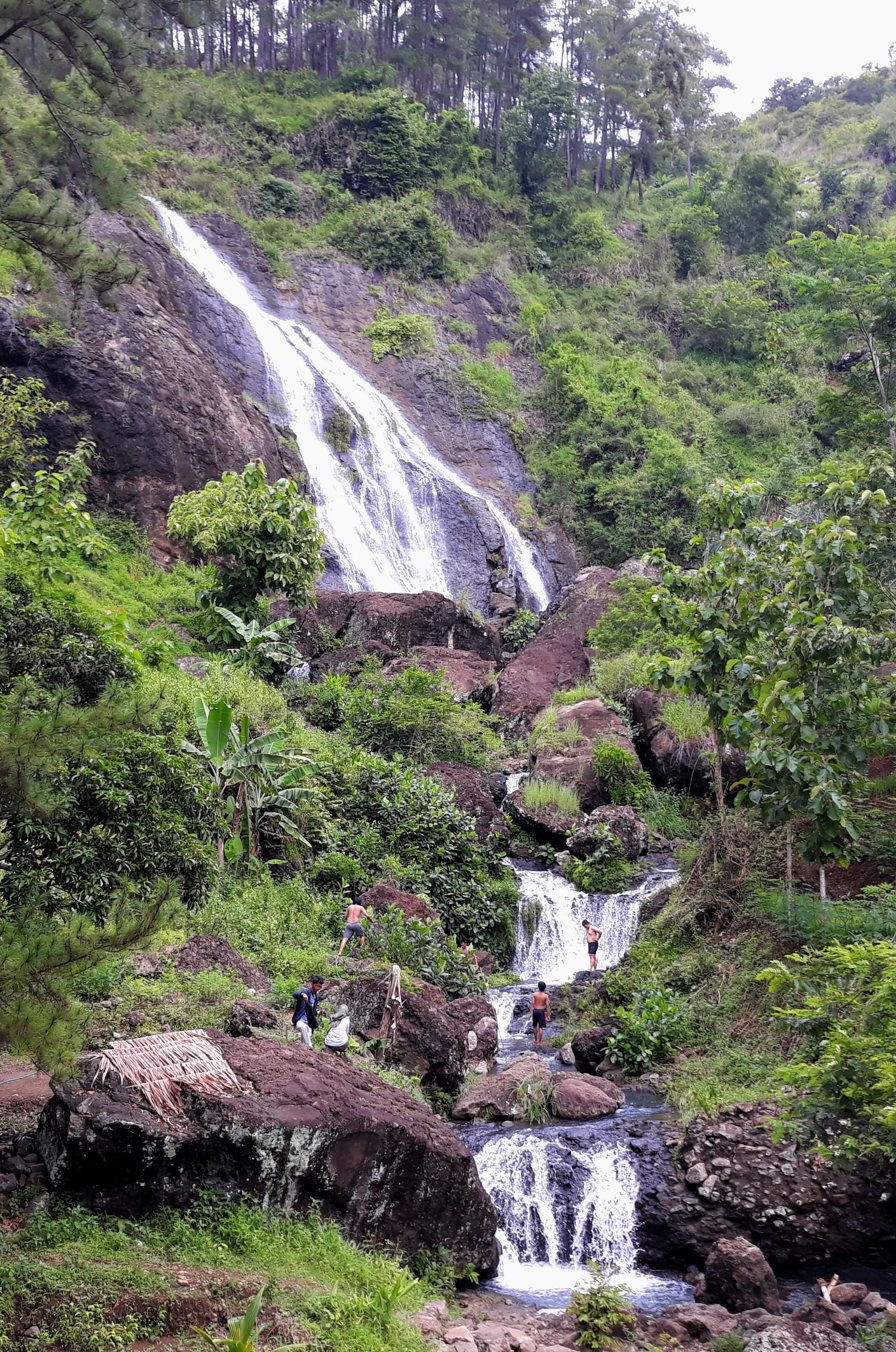
Kedondong Waterfall

One of the regency's main natural-tourism areas is the Karangsambung–Karangbolong Geopark. The Kebumen tourism office records 41 geosites, 2 biosites, and 14 cultural sites in the geopark area, spread across 118 villages in 12 districts. In 2025, UNESCO listed Kebumen as part of the UNESCO Global Geoparks network under the name Kebumen UNESCO Global Geopark.

== Cuisine ==
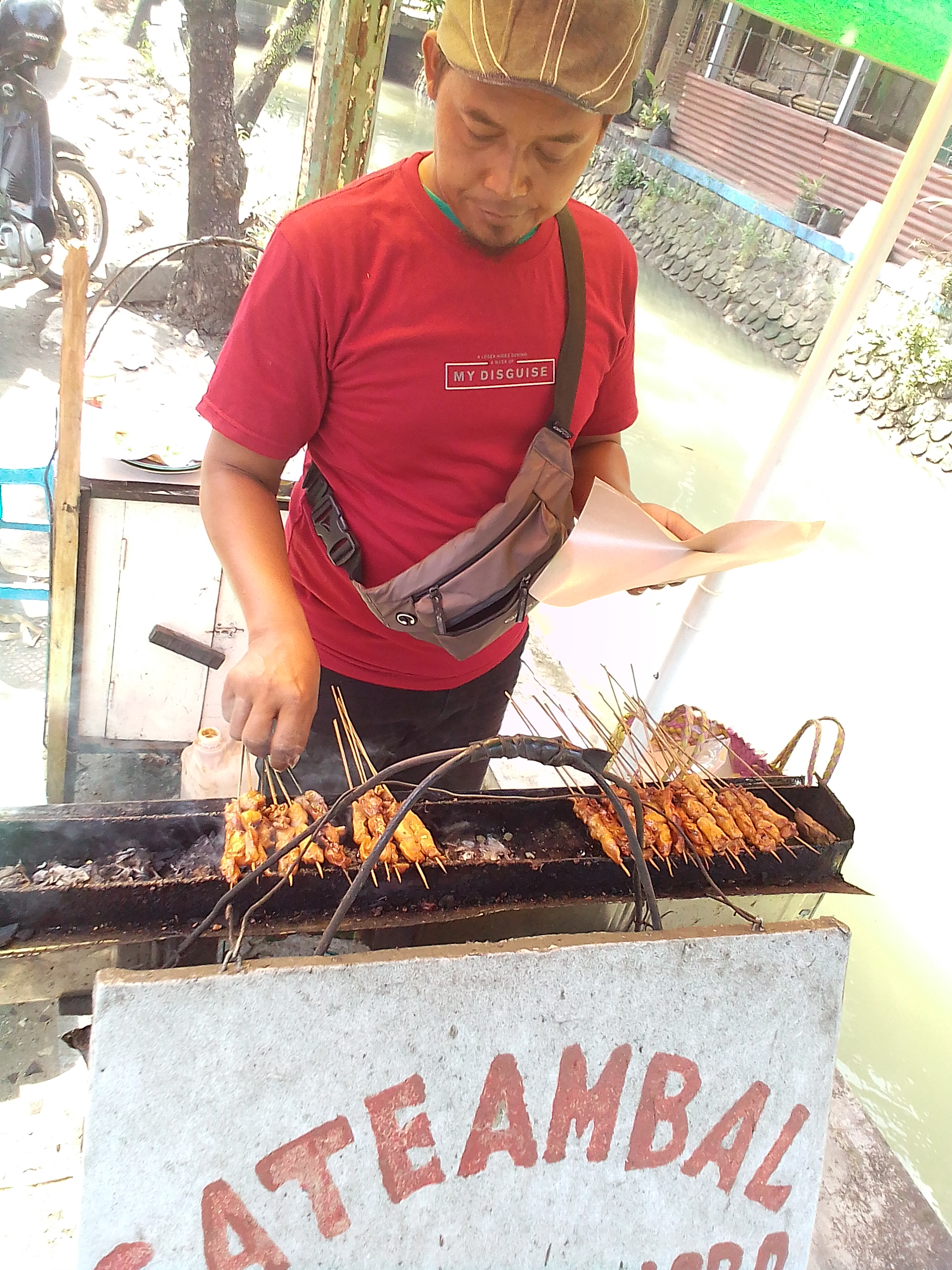
Sate Ambal, a dish associated with Kebumen.

Foods associated with Kebumen include sate ambal, nasi penggel, lanthing, and jipang kacang. These foods are recorded as Kebumen culinary attractions by the Central Java tourism office and the Kebumen Regency tourism office.

Sate Ambal is a chicken satay from Ambal, Kebumen. Unlike many other satay dishes in Indonesia, its sauce is made with a tempeh-based seasoning. Nasi penggel is a dish of rounded rice balls served on banana leaves with side dishes such as beef offal, eggs, jackfruit vegetables, tempeh, and tofu. Lanthing is a cassava-based cracker commonly shaped like a figure eight or small ring.

== Sports ==
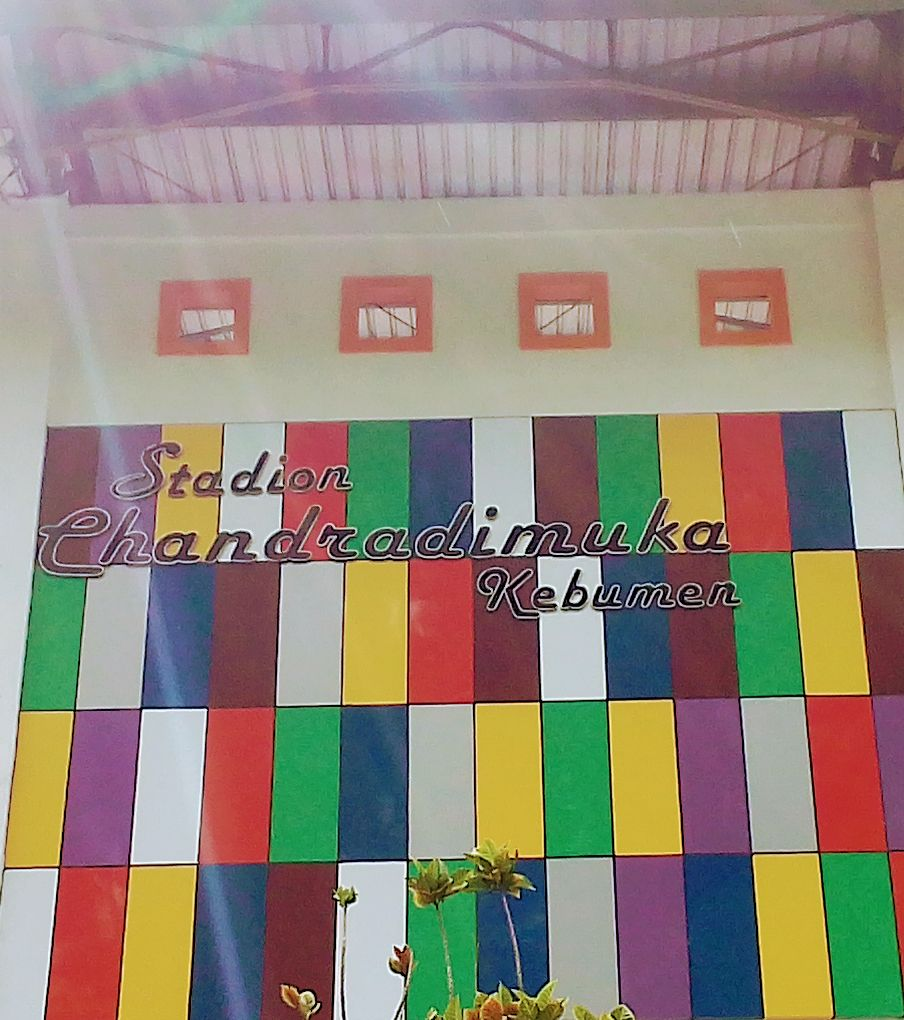
Chandradimuka Stadium in Kebumen.

Football and futsal are among the most visible organized sports in Kebumen Regency. Persak Kebumen is a football club based in Kebumen and has participated in regional football competitions in Central Java. In the 2025/2026 season, Persak Kebumen was listed as a participant in Liga 4 Central Java under the Central Java Provincial Association of the Indonesian Football Association.

Kebumen was also associated with SKN FC Kebumen, a professional futsal club that reached the final of the 2018 Indonesian Professional Futsal League and finished third in the 2019 Pro Futsal League. In women's futsal, Kebumen United Angels won the 2023–2024 Women's Professional Futsal League.

== Notable people ==
Selected people associated with Kebumen

Prabowo Subianto

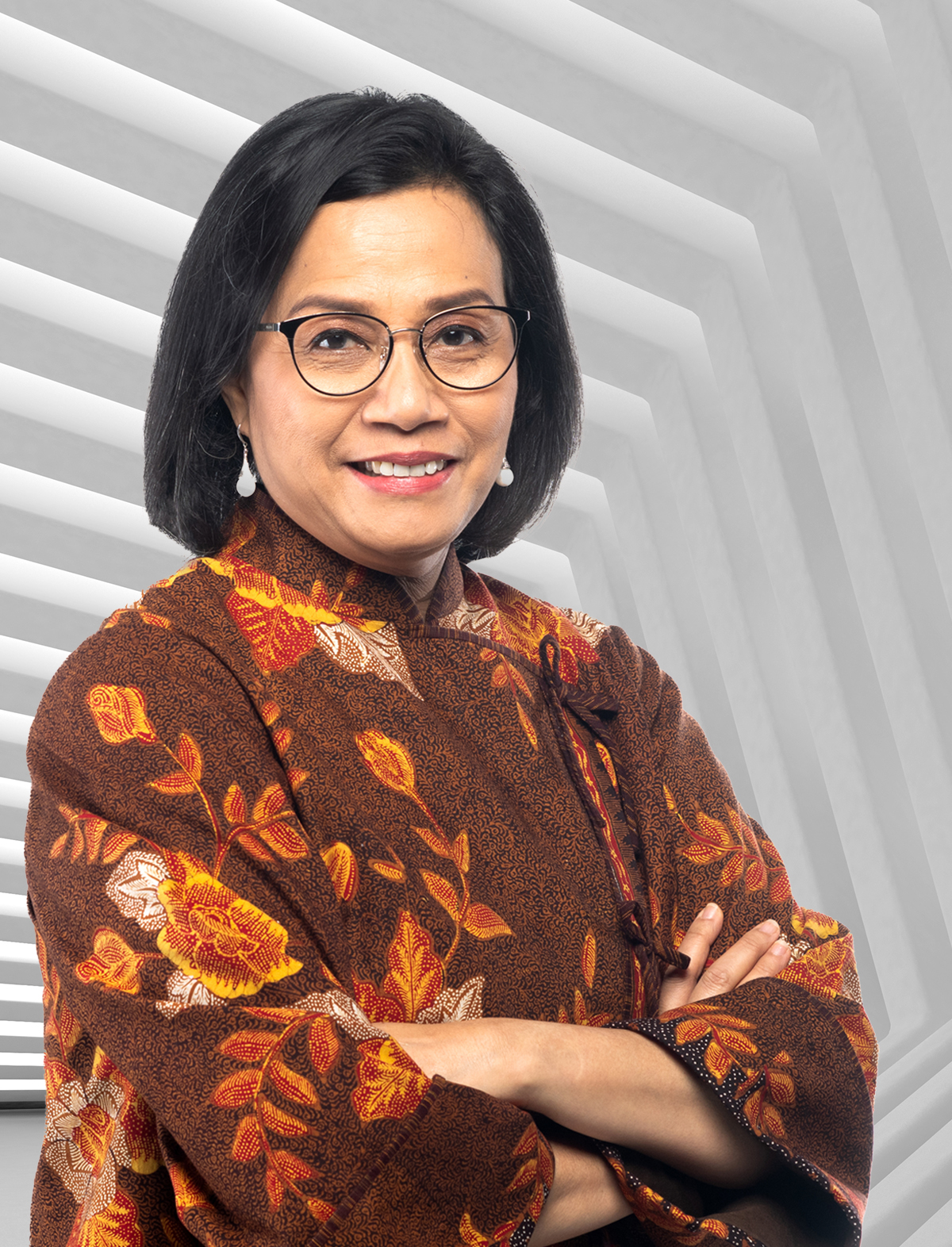
Sri Mulyani

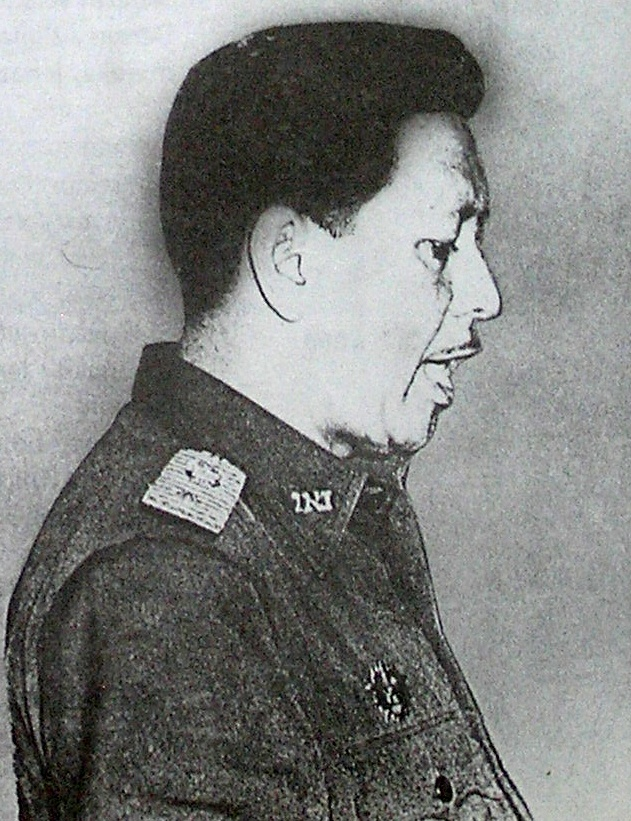
Sutoyo Siswomiharjo

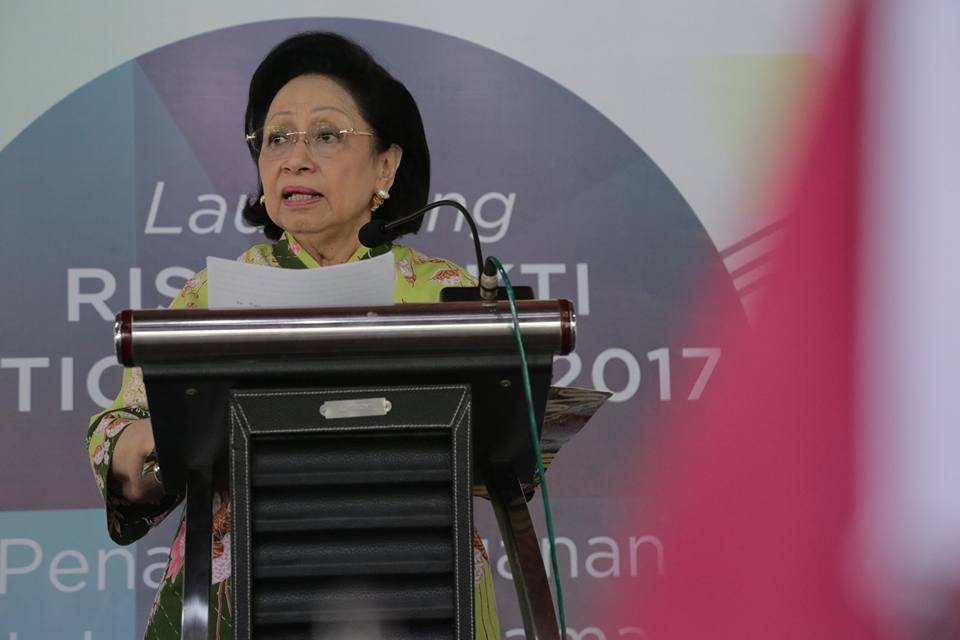
Martha Tilaar

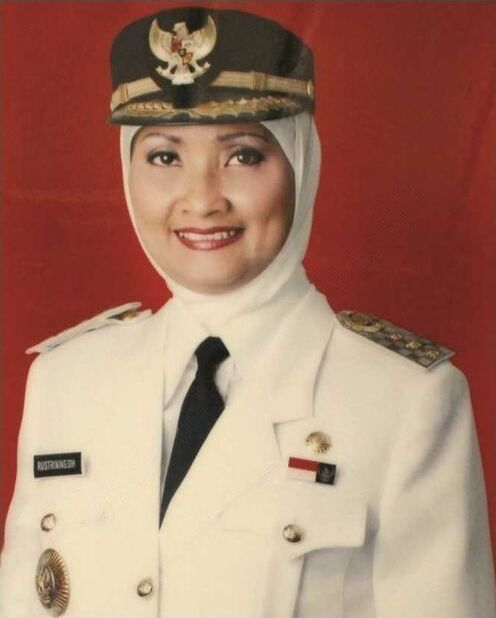
Rustriningsih

Notable people born in or associated with Kebumen include M. Sarbini, a military figure and former Minister of Defence; Sutoyo Siswomiharjo, a Revolutionary Hero; economist and minister Soemitro Djojohadikusumo; comedian Kasino Hadiwibowo of Warkop DKI; entrepreneur Martha Tilaar; businesswoman Kartini Muljadi; former Central Java vice governor Rustriningsih; and singer Shani Indira Natio.

Several national figures have family connections with Kebumen. Prabowo Subianto, the eighth president of Indonesia, is connected to Kebumen through his father, Soemitro Djojohadikusumo, who was born in Kebumen. Sri Mulyani, Indonesia's Minister of Finance, has parents from Kebumen, according to the Ministry of Finance. Indonesian diaspora footballer Amar Rayhan Brkic was born in Frankfurt, Germany, and has maternal ancestry from Kebumen.

== Gallery ==
Kebumen Regency

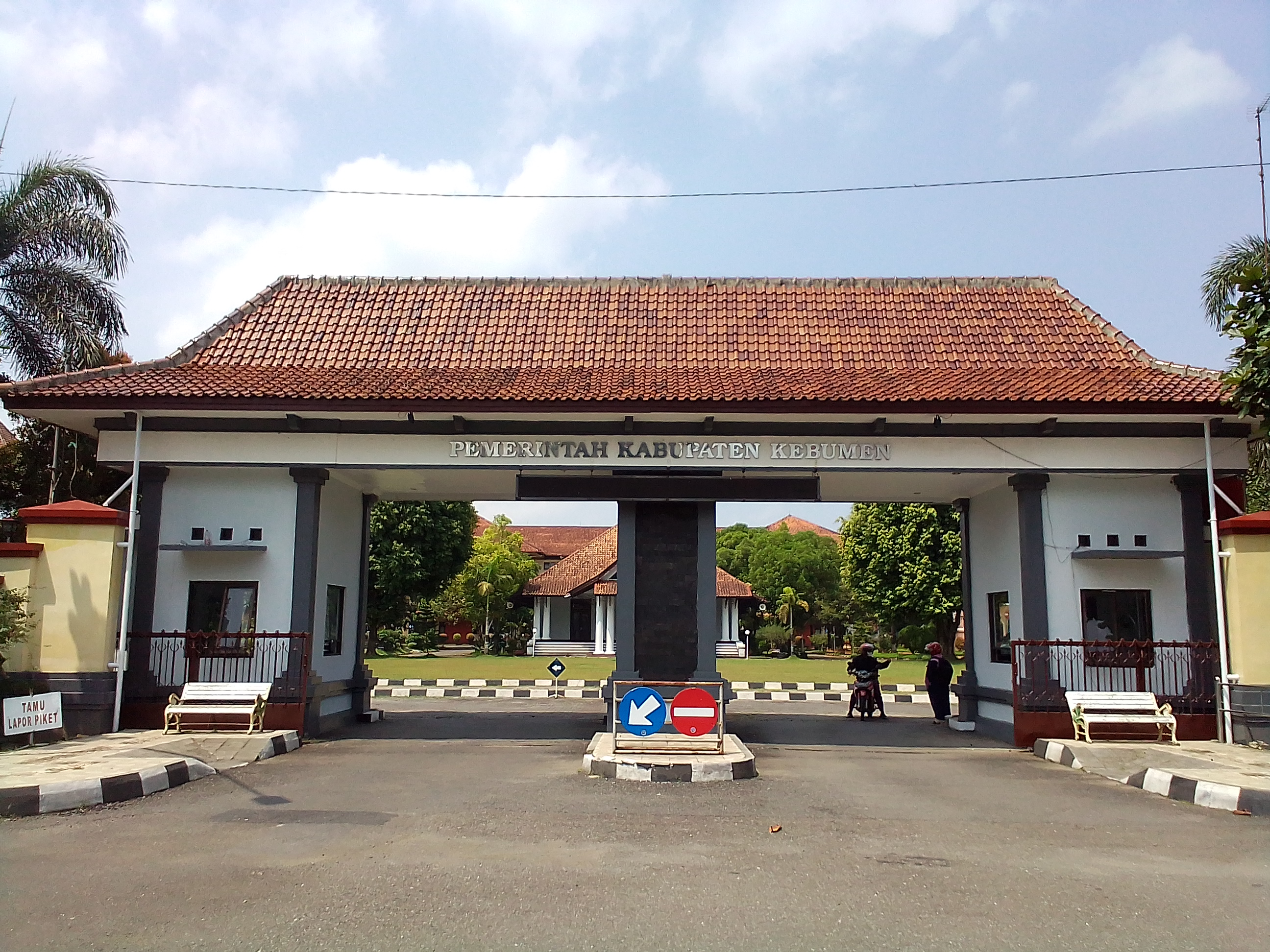
Kebumen Regency Government Office

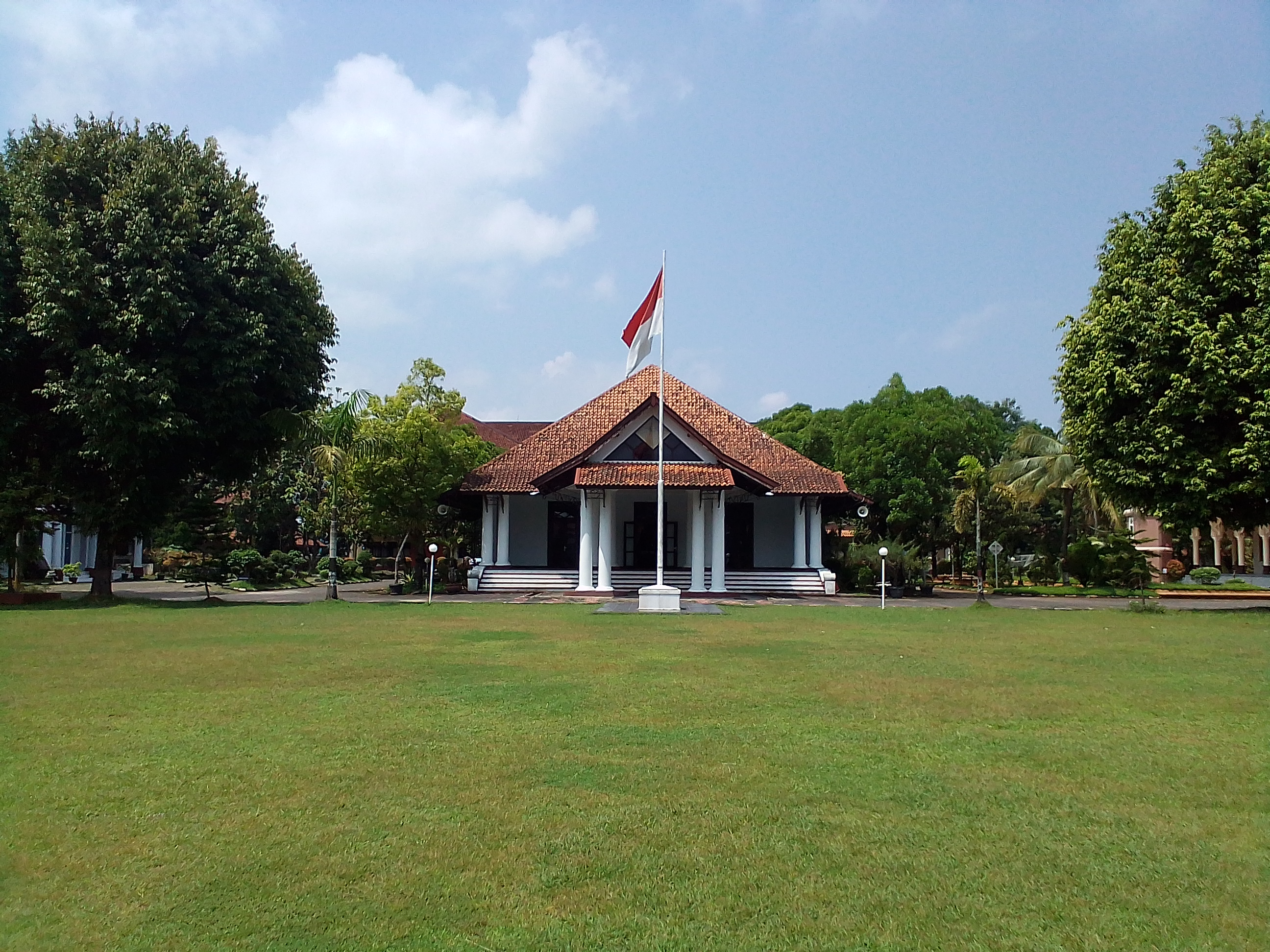
Office of the regent and vice regent

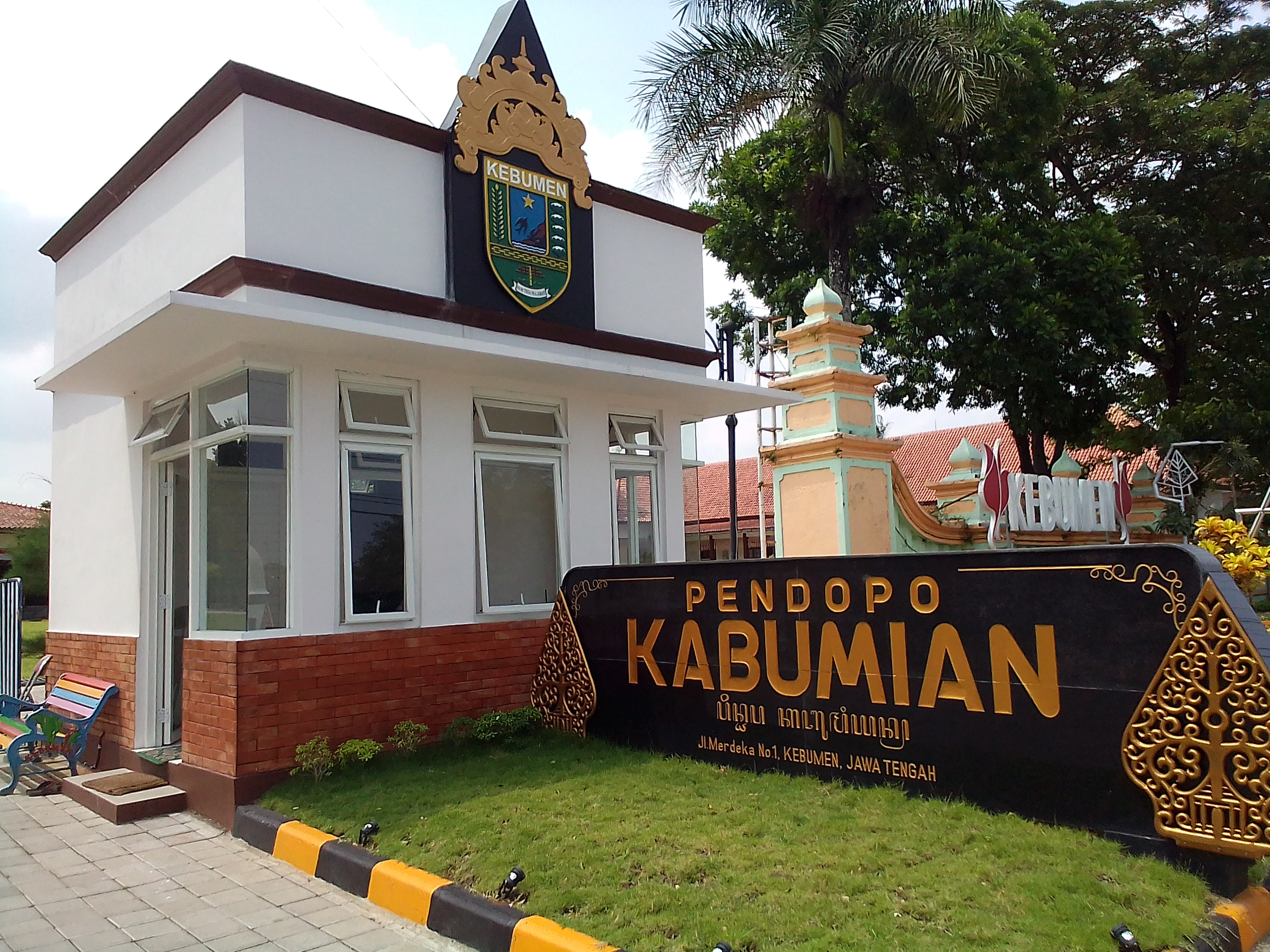
Pendopo Kebumian

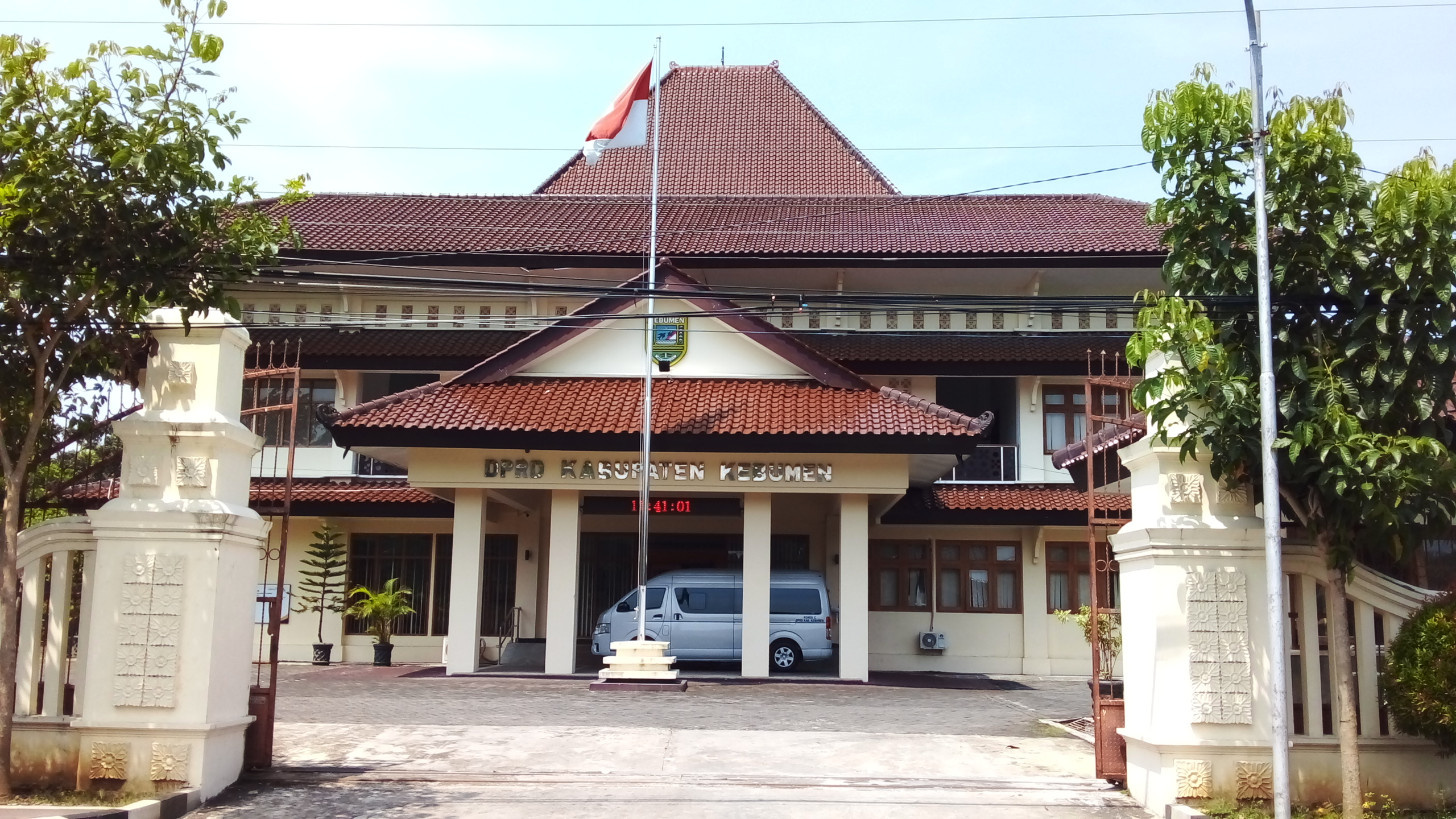
Regional House of Representatives building

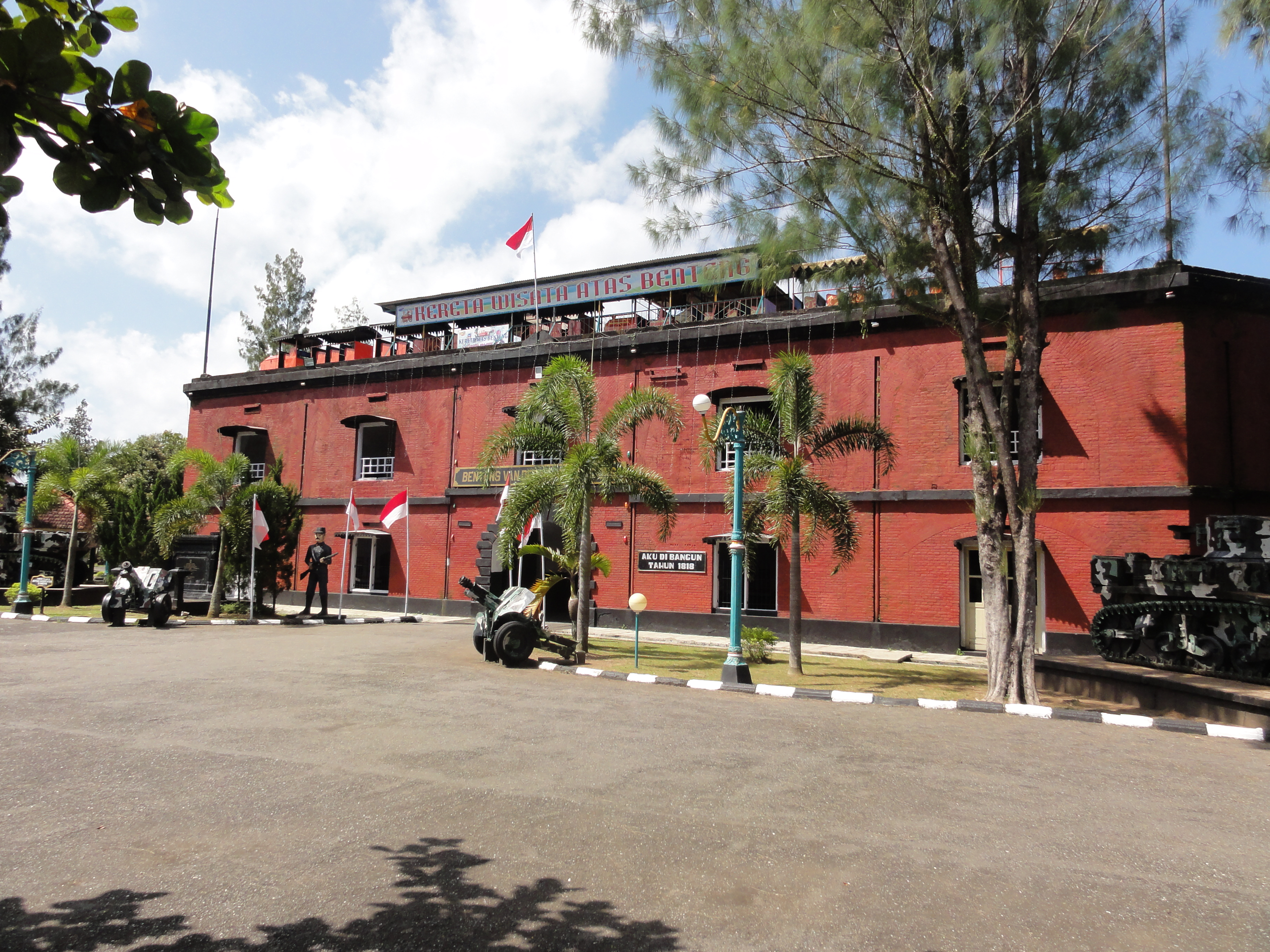
Fort Van der Wijck

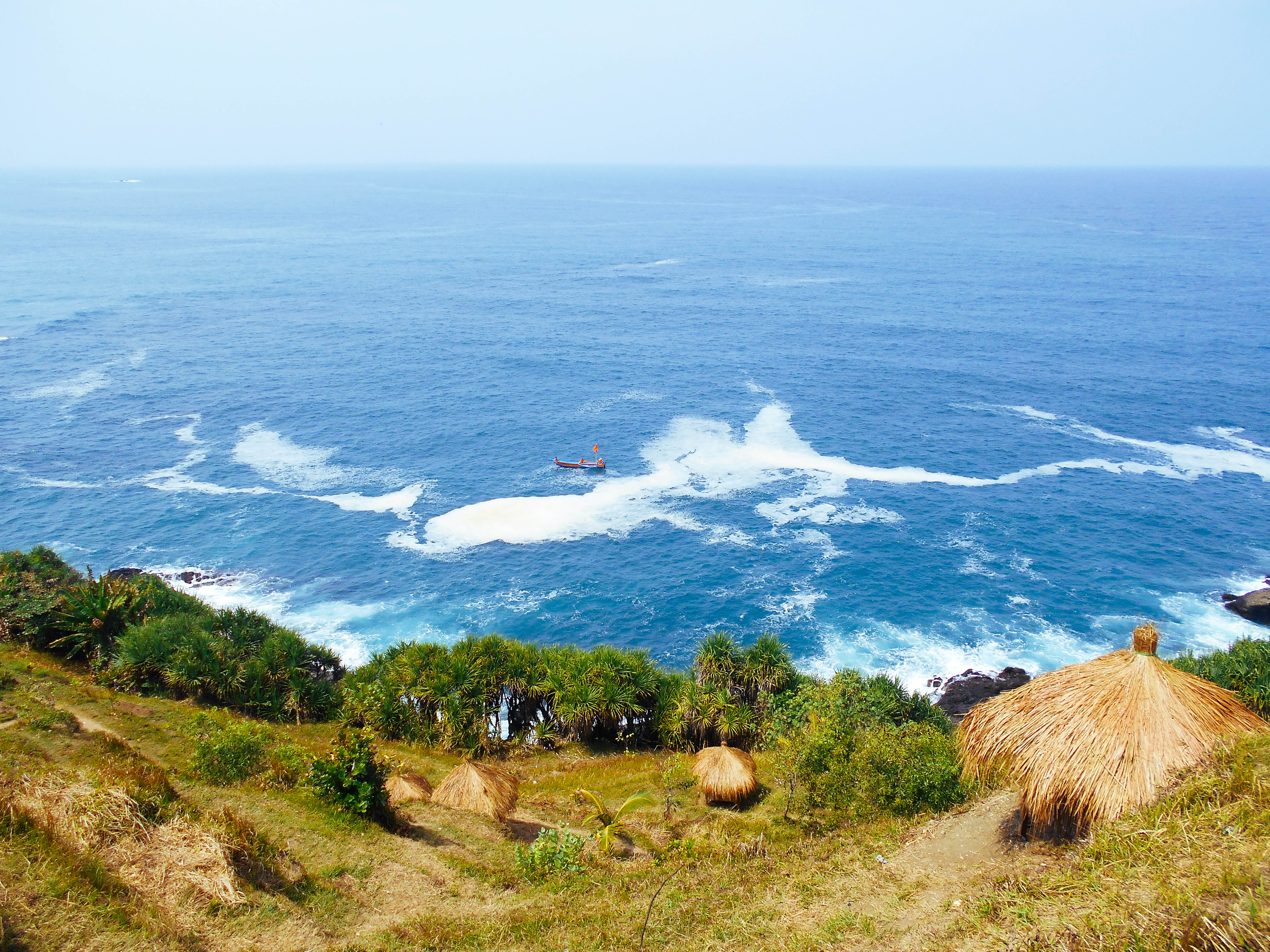
Menganti Beach

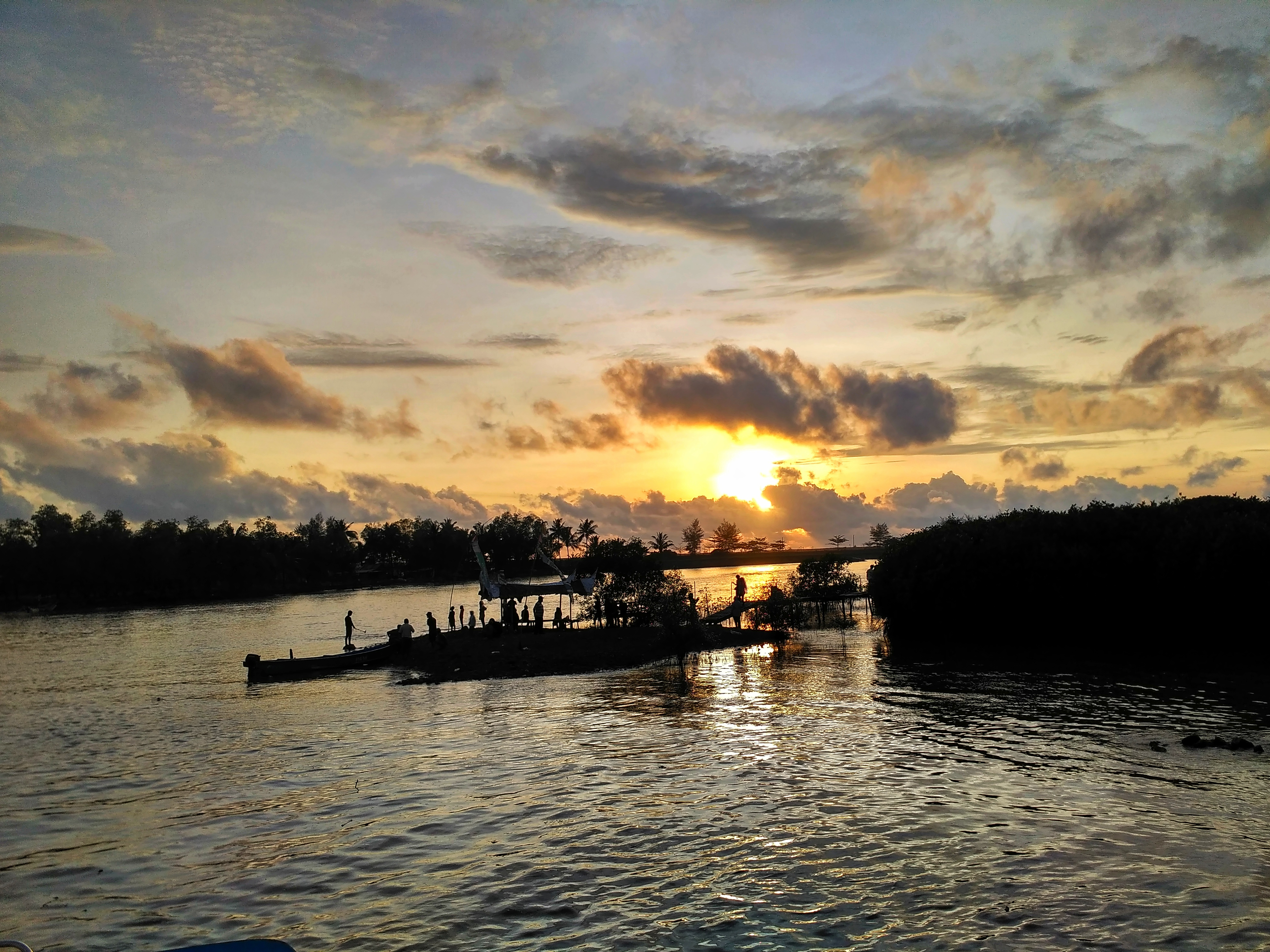
Logending Beach

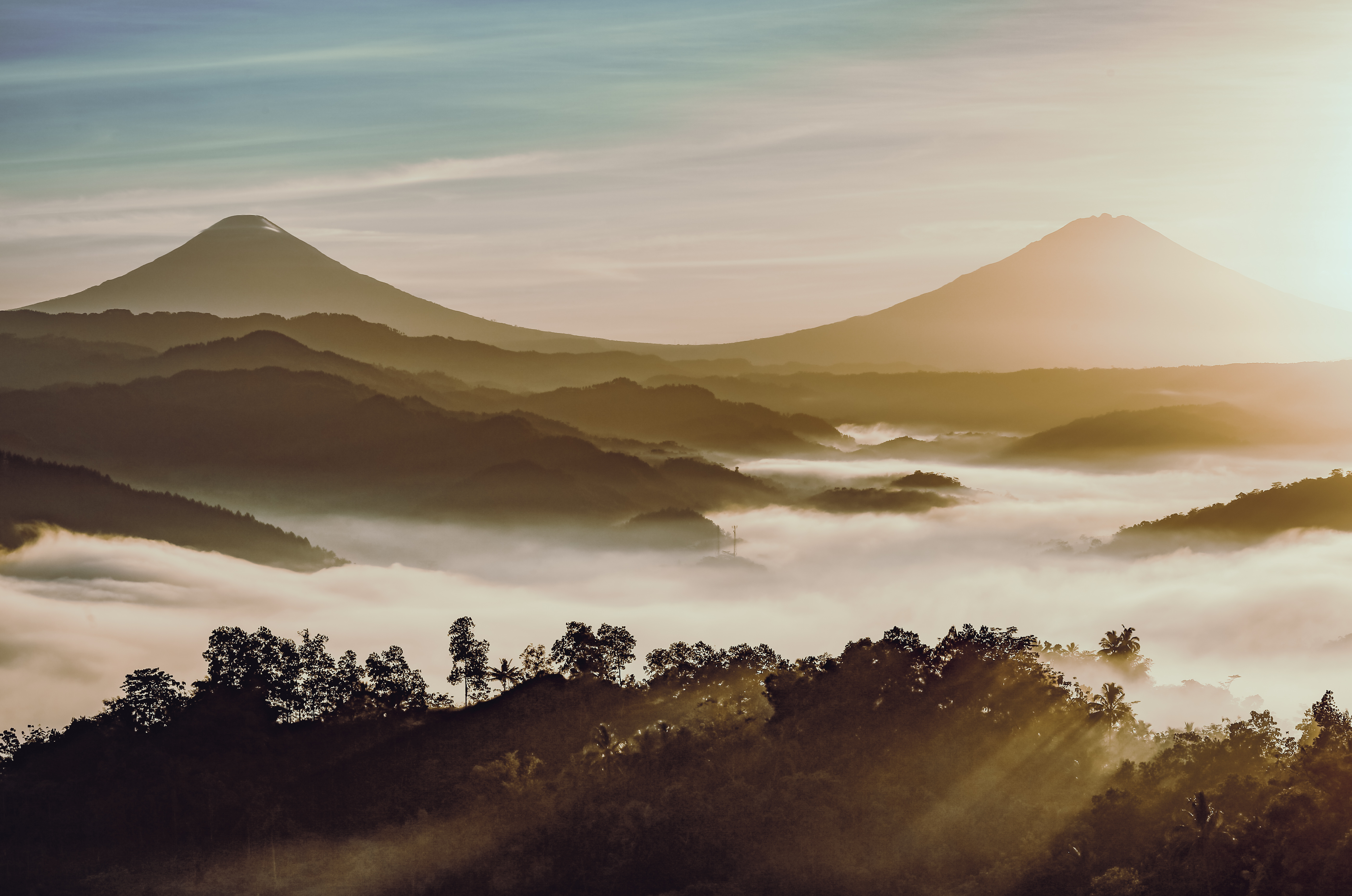
Pentulu Indah Hill

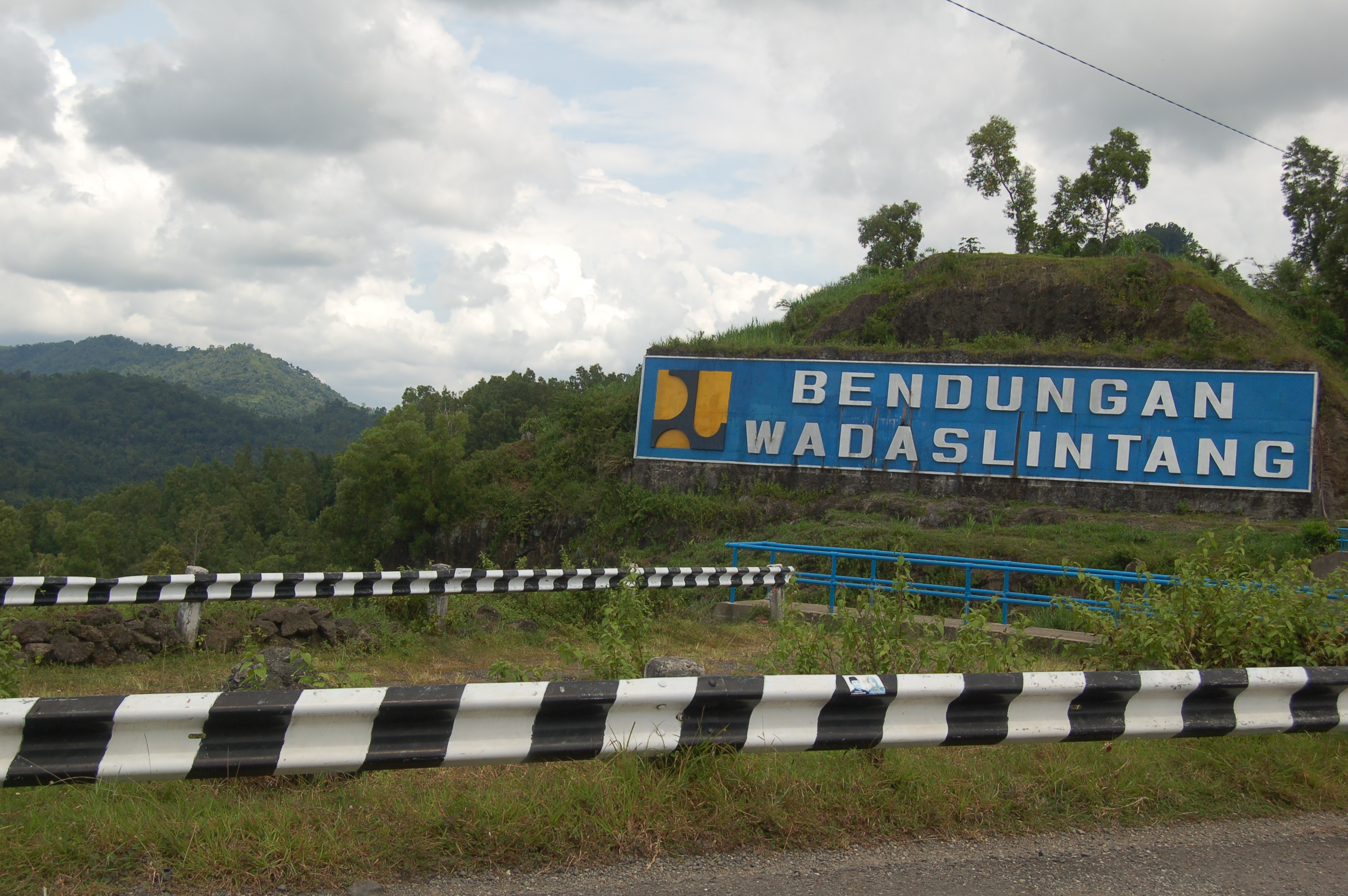
Wadaslintang Reservoir

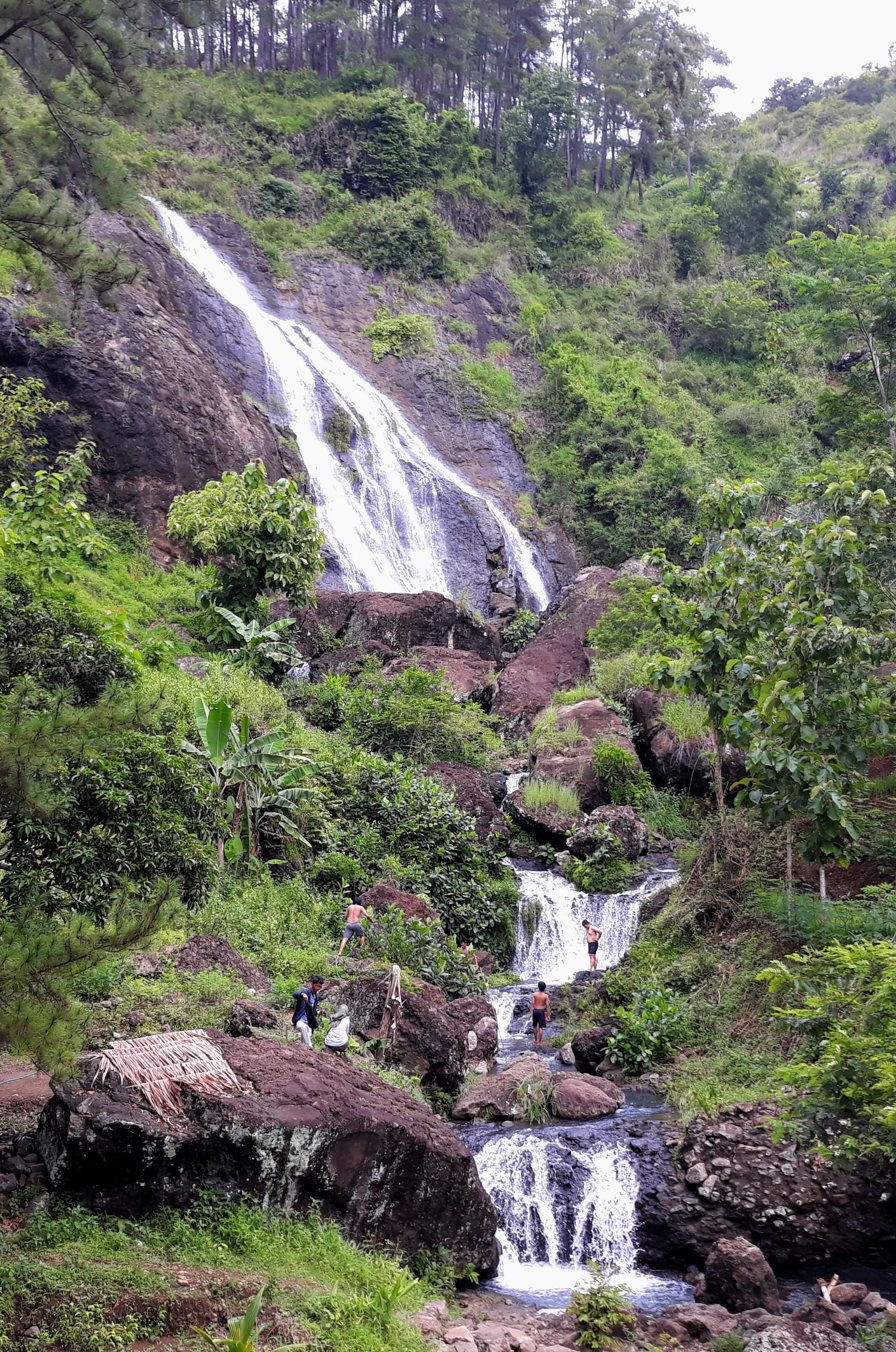
Kedondong Waterfall

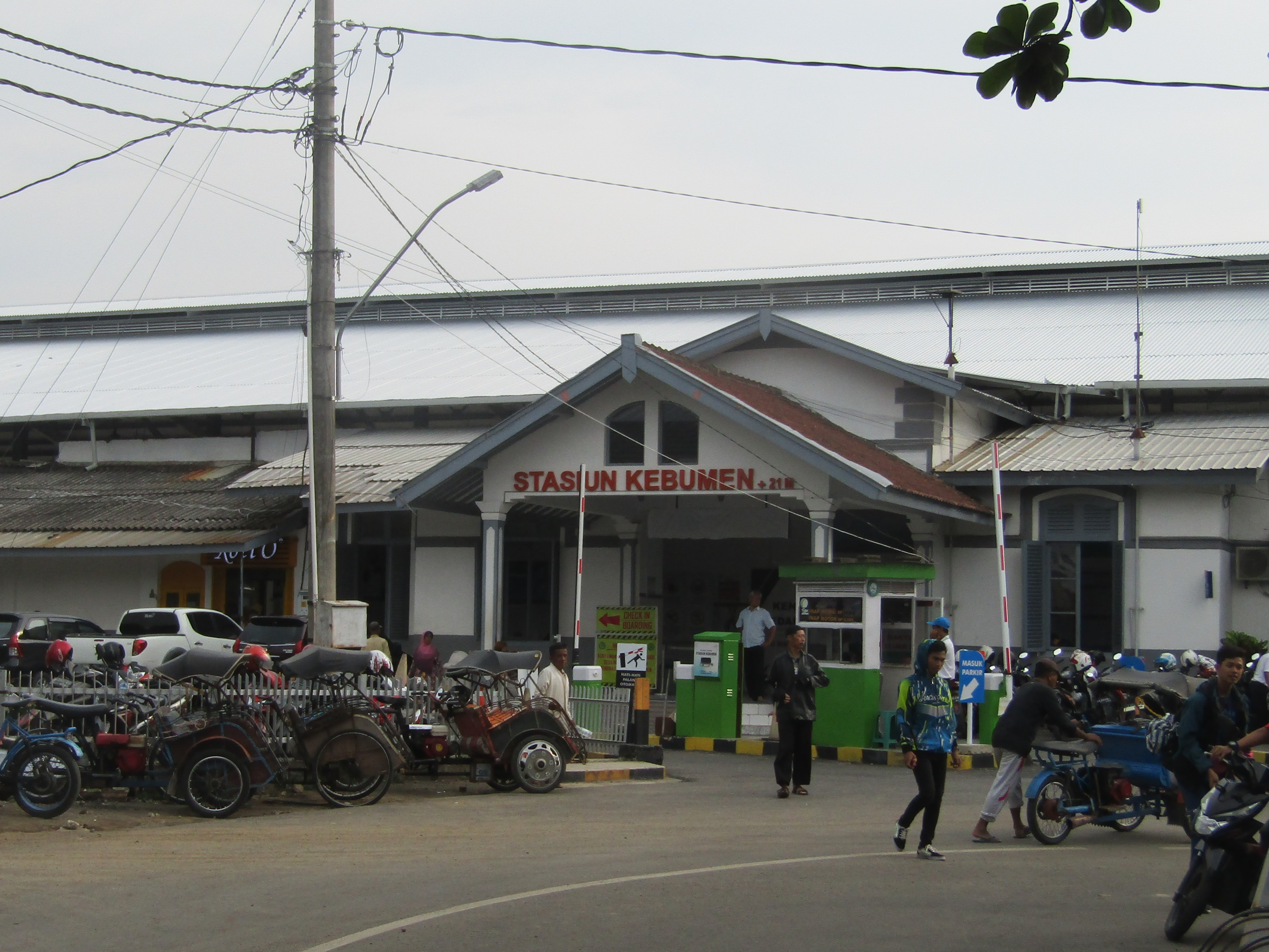
Kebumen railway station

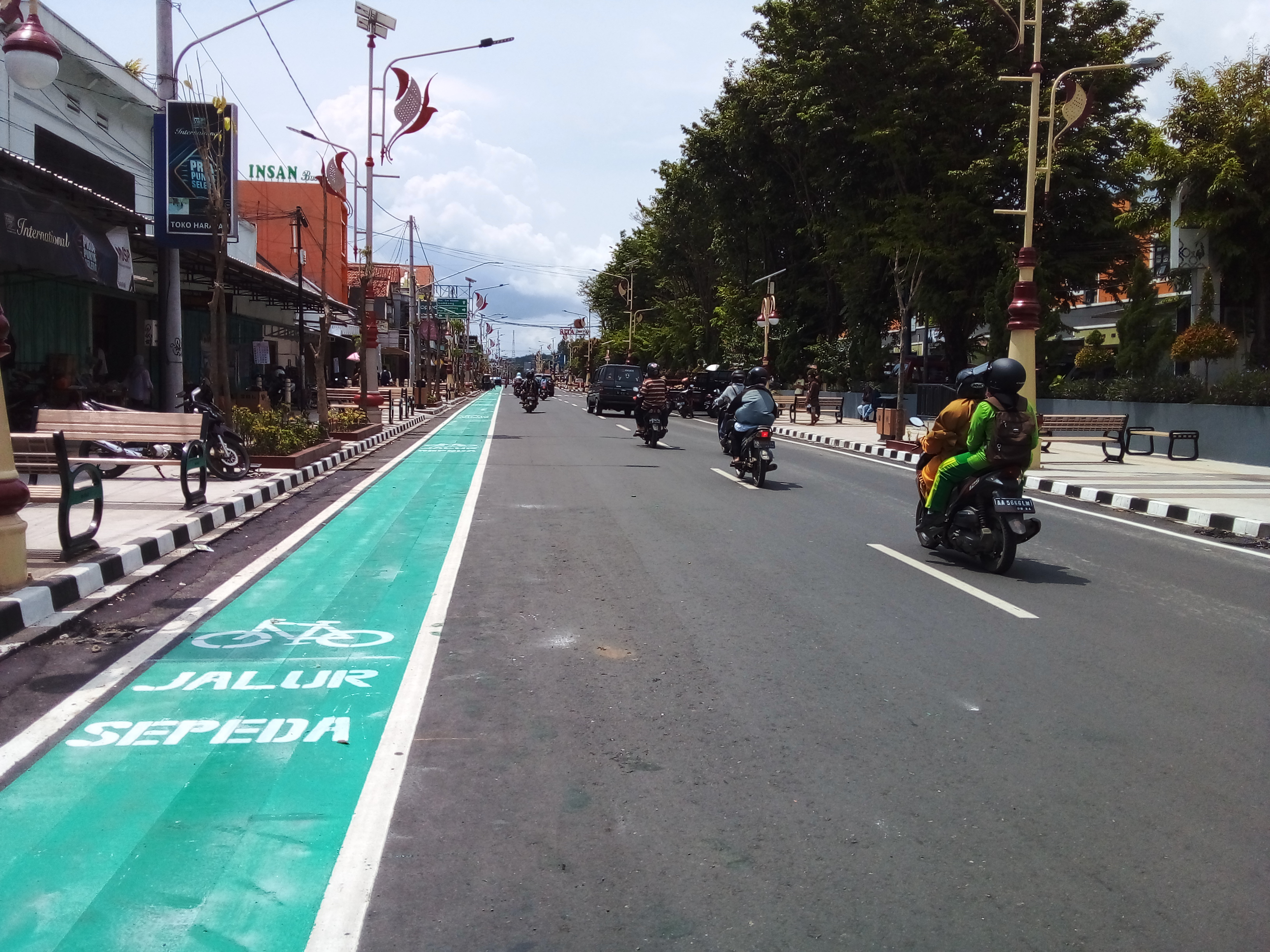
Bicycle lane on Soekarno–Hatta Street, Kebumen

== See also ==
- Sate ambal
- Banyumasan dialect
- Kedu Plain
