= 2022 Liga 3 Central Java =

Counterpain Liga 3 2022

Tournament details
- Country: Indonesia
- Dates: 18 September 2022–30 December 2022
- Teams: 39

Final positions
- Champions: Persip Pekalongan
- Runners-up: PSIK Klaten
- Qualified for: 2022 Liga 3 National Round

The 2022 Liga 3 Central Java or 2022 Counterpain Liga 3 for sponsor reasons, was the seventh season of Liga 3 Central Java organized by Asprov PSSI Central Java.

Persipa Pati is the defending champion after winning it in the 2021 season.

== Teams ==
2022 Liga 3 Central Java was attended by 39 teams.

| No | Team | Location |
|---|---|---|
| 01 | Persibas | Banyumas Regency |
| 02 | Persibat | Batang Regency |
| 03 | Persikaba | Blora Regency |
| 04 | Persebi | Boyolali Regency |
| 05 | Persab | Brebes Regency |
| 06 | PSD | Demak Regency |
| 07 | PSDB United | Demak Regency |
| 08 | Persipur | Grobogan Regency |
| 09 | Persika | Karanganyar Regency |
| 10 | Persak | Kebumen Regency |
| 11 | Ebod Jaya | Kebumen Regency |
| 12 | Persik | Kendal Regency |
| 13 | PSIK | Klaten Regency |
| 14 | Persiku | Kudus Regency |
| 15 | Persikama | Magelang Regency |
| 16 | Safin Pati | Pati Regency |
| 17 | Persekap | Pekalongan Regency |
| 18 | Bintang Timur | Pekalongan Regency |
| 19 | PSIP | Pemalang Regency |
| 20 | Persibangga | Purbalingga Regency |
| 21 | ISP | Purworejo Regency |
| 22 | PSIR | Rembang Regency |
| 23 | Persikas | Semarang Regency |
| 24 | Persiharjo | Sukoharjo Regency |
| 25 | Slawi United | Tegal Regency |
| 26 | Persitema | Temanggung Regency |
| 27 | Persiwi | Wonogiri Regency |
| 28 | PSIW | Wonosobo Regency |
| 29 | PPSM Sakti | Magelang |
| 30 | Persip | Pekalongan |
| 31 | PSISa | Salatiga |
| 32 | Berlian Rajawali | Semarang |
| 33 | BJL 2000 | Semarang |
| 34 | Bhayangkara Muda | Semarang |
| 35 | Mahesa Jenar Muda | Semarang |
| 36 | Putra Surakarta | Surakarta |
| 37 | AT Farmasi | Surakarta |
| 38 | Universitas Surakarta | Surakarta |
| 39 | Perinka | Tegal |

== First round ==
=== Group A ===
| Pos | Team | Pld | W | D | L | GF | GA | GD | Pts | Qualification | PSB | SLA | PNK |
|---|---|---|---|---|---|---|---|---|---|---|---|---|---|
| 1 | Persab (A) | 4 | 3 | 1 | 0 | 10 | 0 | +10 | 10 | Advance to Second round | — | 0–0 | 3–0 (Note: Persab were awarded a 3–0 win over Perinka, due to withdrawal of Perinka from 2022 Liga 3 Central Java.) |
| 2 | Slawi United (A) | 4 | 2 | 1 | 1 | 9 | 4 | +5 | 7 | Possible Advance to Second round | 0–4 | — | 6–0 |
| 3 | Perinka (Note: Perinka withdrew from 2022 Liga 3 Central Java.) (E) | 4 | 0 | 0 | 4 | 0 | 15 | −15 | 0 | Withdrew | 0–3 (Note: Persab were awarded a 3–0 win over Perinka, due to withdrawal of Perinka from 2022 Liga 3 Central Java.) | 0–3 (Note: Slawi United were awarded a 3–0 win over Perinka, due to withdrawal of Perinka from 2022 Liga 3 Central Java.) | — |

Updated to match(es) played on unknown. Source: Liga 3 2022 Central Java
(A) Advance to a further round; (E) Eliminated

=== Group B ===
| Pos | Team | Pld | W | D | L | GF | GA | GD | Pts | Qualification | PMG | PKP | BJL |
|---|---|---|---|---|---|---|---|---|---|---|---|---|---|
| 1 | PSIP (A) | 4 | 3 | 1 | 0 | 12 | 2 | +10 | 10 | Advance to Second round | — | 3–1 | 1–1 |
| 2 | Persekap (E) | 4 | 2 | 0 | 2 | 10 | 8 | +2 | 6 | Possible Advance to Second round | 0–2 | — | 4–2 |
| 3 | BJL 2000 (E) | 4 | 0 | 1 | 3 | 4 | 16 | −12 | 1 | | 0–6 | 1–5 | — |

Updated to match(es) played on unknown. Source: Liga 3 2022 Central Java
(A) Advance to a further round; (E) Eliminated

=== Group C ===
| Pos | Team | Pld | W | D | L | GF | GA | GD | Pts | Qualification | PBT | PSA | BLI |
|---|---|---|---|---|---|---|---|---|---|---|---|---|---|
| 1 | Persibat (A) | 4 | 3 | 1 | 0 | 11 | 2 | +9 | 10 | Advance to Second round | — | 3–1 | 3–0 (Note: Persibat were awarded a 3–0 win over Berlian Rajawali, due to withdrawal of Berlian Rajawali from 2022 Liga 3 Central Java.) |
| 2 | PSISa (E) | 4 | 1 | 2 | 1 | 5 | 4 | +1 | 5 | Possible Advance to Second round | 1–1 | — | 0–0 |
| 3 | Berlian Rajawali (E) | 4 | 0 | 1 | 3 | 0 | 10 | −10 | 1 | Withdrew | 0–4 | 0–3 | — |

Updated to match(es) played on unknown. Source: Liga 3 2022 Central Java
(A) Advance to a further round; (E) Eliminated

=== Group D ===
| Pos | Team | Pld | W | D | L | GF | GA | GD | Pts | Qualification | PRK | BHA | BTR |
|---|---|---|---|---|---|---|---|---|---|---|---|---|---|
| 1 | Persik (A) | 4 | 3 | 1 | 0 | 13 | 1 | +12 | 10 | Advance to Second round | — | 1–1 | 6–0 |
| 2 | Bhayangkara Muda (A) | 4 | 2 | 1 | 1 | 7 | 4 | +3 | 7 | Possible Advance to Second round | 0–3 | — | 3–0 (Note: Bhayangkara Muda were awarded a 3–0 win over Bintang Timur, due to withdrawal of Bintang Timur from 2022 Liga 3 Central Java.) |
| 3 | Bintang Timur (Note: Bintang Timur withdrew from 2022 Liga 3 Central Java) (E) | 4 | 0 | 0 | 4 | 0 | 15 | −15 | 0 | Withdrew | 0–3 (Note: Persik were awarded a 3–0 win over Bintang Timur, due to withdrawal of Bintang Timur from 2022 Liga 3 Central Java.) | 0–3 (Note: Bhayangkara Muda were awarded a 3–0 win over Bintang Timur, due to withdrawal of Bintang Timur from 2022 Liga 3 Central Java.) | — |

Updated to match(es) played on unknown. Source: Liga 3 2022 Central Java
(A) Advance to a further round; (E) Eliminated

=== Group E ===
| Pos | Team | Pld | W | D | L | GF | GA | GD | Pts | Qualification | PRP | MJM | PKS |
|---|---|---|---|---|---|---|---|---|---|---|---|---|---|
| 1 | Persip (A) | 4 | 4 | 0 | 0 | 12 | 0 | +12 | 12 | Advance to Second round | — | 3–0 | 5–0 |
| 2 | Mahesa Jenar Muda (E) | 4 | 2 | 0 | 2 | 5 | 5 | 0 | 6 | Possible Advance to Second round | 0–1 | — | 3–0 (Note: Mahesa Jenar Muda were awarded a 3–0 win over Persikas, due to withdrawal of Persikas from 2022 Liga 3 Central Java.) |
| 3 | Persikas (E) | 4 | 0 | 0 | 4 | 1 | 13 | −12 | 0 | Withdrew | 0–3 (Note: Persip were awarded a 3–0 win over Persikas, due to withdrawal of Persikas from 2022 Liga 3 Central Java.) | 1–2 | — |

Updated to match(es) played on unknown. Source: Liga 3 2022 Central Java
(A) Advance to a further round; (E) Eliminated

=== Group F ===
| Pos | Team | Pld | W | D | L | GF | GA | GD | Pts | Qualification | WBO | PBS | PGA |
|---|---|---|---|---|---|---|---|---|---|---|---|---|---|
| 1 | PSIW (A) | 4 | 2 | 1 | 1 | 8 | 4 | +4 | 7 | Advance to Second round | — | 1–2 | 4–0 |
| 2 | Persibas (E) | 4 | 2 | 0 | 2 | 4 | 3 | +1 | 6 | Possible Advance to Second round | 0–1 | — | 0–1 |
| 3 | Persibangga (E) | 4 | 1 | 1 | 2 | 3 | 8 | −5 | 4 | | 2–2 | 0–2 | — |

Updated to match(es) played on unknown. Source: Liga 3 2022 Central Java
(A) Advance to a further round; (E) Eliminated

=== Group G ===
| Pos | Team | Pld | W | D | L | GF | GA | GD | Pts | Qualification | KMN | PMA | ISP |
|---|---|---|---|---|---|---|---|---|---|---|---|---|---|
| 1 | Persak (A) | 4 | 4 | 0 | 0 | 15 | 4 | +11 | 12 | Advance to Second round | — | 3–1 | 5–0 |
| 2 | Persikama (E) | 4 | 0 | 2 | 2 | 3 | 7 | −4 | 2 (Note: Tied on head-to-head points; head-to-head goal difference and head-to-head goals scored. Goal difference: Persikama −4, ISP −7) | Possible Advance to Second round | 2–4 | — | 0–0 |
| 3 | ISP (E) | 4 | 0 | 2 | 2 | 1 | 8 | −7 | 2 | | 1–3 | 0–0 | — |

Updated to match(es) played on unknown. Source: Liga 3 2022 Central Java
(A) Advance to a further round; (E) Eliminated

=== Group H ===
| Pos | Team | Pld | W | D | L | GF | GA | GD | Pts | Qualification | PTA | MGL | EJA |
|---|---|---|---|---|---|---|---|---|---|---|---|---|---|
| 1 | Persitema (A) | 4 | 4 | 0 | 0 | 9 | 2 | +7 | 12 | Advance to Second round | — | 2–1 | 2–1 |
| 2 | PPSM (A) | 4 | 2 | 0 | 2 | 7 | 4 | +3 | 6 | Possible Advance to Second round | 0–2 | — | 3–0 (Note: PPSM were awarded a 3–0 win over Ebod Jaya, due to withdrawal of Ebod Jaya from 2022 Liga 3 Central Java.) |
| 3 | Ebod Jaya (Note: Ebod Jaya withdrew from 2022 Liga 3 Central Java) (E) | 4 | 0 | 0 | 4 | 1 | 11 | −10 | 0 | Withdrew | 0–3 (Note: Persitema were awarded a 3–0 win over Ebod Jaya, due to withdrawal of Ebod Jaya from 2022 Liga 3 Central Java.) | 0–3 (Note: PPSM were awarded a 3–0 win over Ebod Jaya, due to withdrawal of Ebod Jaya from 2022 Liga 3 Central Java.) | — |

Updated to match(es) played on unknown. Source: Liga 3 2022 Central Java
(A) Advance to a further round; (E) Eliminated

=== Group I ===
| Pos | Team | Pld | W | D | L | GF | GA | GD | Pts | Qualification | USU | PKA | PWI |
|---|---|---|---|---|---|---|---|---|---|---|---|---|---|
| 1 | Universitas Surakarta (A) | 4 | 3 | 0 | 1 | 7 | 2 | +5 | 9 (Note: Tied on head-to-head points. Head-to-head goal difference: Universitas Surakarta +1, Persika –1.) | Advance to Second round | — | 2–0 | 3–0 (Note: Universitas Surakarta were awarded a 3–0 win over Persiwi, due to withdrawal of Persiwi from 2022 Liga 3 Central Java.) |
| 2 | Persika (A) | 4 | 3 | 0 | 1 | 10 | 3 | +7 | 9 | Possible Advance to Second round | 1–0 | — | 6–1 |
| 3 | Persiwi (Note: Persiwi withdrew from 2022 Liga 3 Central Java) (E) | 4 | 0 | 0 | 4 | 2 | 14 | −12 | 0 | Withdrew | 1–2 | 0–3 (Note: Persika were awarded a 3–0 win over Persiwi, due to withdrawal of Persiwi from 2022 Liga 3 Central Java.) | — |

Updated to match(es) played on unknown. Source: Liga 3 2022 Central Java
(A) Advance to a further round; (E) Eliminated

=== Group J ===
| Pos | Team | Pld | W | D | L | GF | GA | GD | Pts | Qualification | KLA | ATF | PBI |
|---|---|---|---|---|---|---|---|---|---|---|---|---|---|
| 1 | PSIK (A) | 4 | 3 | 0 | 1 | 12 | 5 | +7 | 9 | Advance to Second round | — | 3–0 | 3–0 (Note: PSIK were awarded a 3–0 win over Persebi, due to withdrawal of Persebi from 2022 Liga 3 Central Java.) |
| 2 | AT Farmasi (E) | 4 | 2 | 0 | 2 | 7 | 7 | 0 | 6 | Possible Advance to Second round | 1–4 | — | 3–0 (Note: AT Farmasi were awarded a 3–0 win over Persebi, due to withdrawal of Persebi from 2022 Liga 3 Central Java.) |
| 3 | Persebi (Note: Persebi withdrew from 2022 Liga 3 Central Java) (E) | 4 | 1 | 0 | 3 | 4 | 11 | −7 | 3 | withdrew | 4–2 | 3–0 (Note: AT Farmasi were awarded a 3–0 win over Persebi, due to withdrawal of Persebi from 2022 Liga 3 Central Java.) | — |

Updated to match(es) played on unknown. Source: Liga 3 2022 Central Java
(A) Advance to a further round; (E) Eliminated

=== Group K ===
| Pos | Team | Pld | W | D | L | GF | GA | GD | Pts | Qualification | PPR | PSU | PJO |
|---|---|---|---|---|---|---|---|---|---|---|---|---|---|
| 1 | Persipur (A) | 4 | 2 | 1 | 1 | 6 | 3 | +3 | 7 | Advance to Second round | — | 1–1 | 2–0 |
| 2 | Putra Surakarta (E) | 4 | 1 | 3 | 0 | 4 | 3 | +1 | 6 | Possible Advance to Second round | 2–1 | — | 0–0 |
| 3 | Persiharjo (E) | 4 | 0 | 2 | 2 | 1 | 5 | −4 | 2 | | 0–2 | 1–1 | — |

Updated to match(es) played on unknown. Source: Liga 3 2022 Central Java
(A) Advance to a further round; (E) Eliminated

=== Group L ===
| Pos | Team | Pld | W | D | L | GF | GA | GD | Pts | Qualification | PKU | PUN | PBA |
|---|---|---|---|---|---|---|---|---|---|---|---|---|---|
| 1 | Persiku (A) | 4 | 3 | 1 | 0 | 11 | 3 | +8 | 10 | Advance to Second round | — | 1–1 | 2–0 |
| 2 | PSDB United (A) | 4 | 2 | 1 | 1 | 7 | 5 | +2 | 7 | Possible Advance to Second round | 1–2 | — | 3–2 |
| 3 | Persikaba (E) | 4 | 0 | 0 | 4 | 3 | 13 | −10 | 0 | | 1–6 | 0–2 | — |

Updated to match(es) played on unknown. Source: Liga 3 2022 Central Java
(A) Advance to a further round; (E) Eliminated

=== Group M ===
| Pos | Team | Pld | W | D | L | GF | GA | GD | Pts | Qualification | RBG | SPN | PSD |
|---|---|---|---|---|---|---|---|---|---|---|---|---|---|
| 1 | PSIR (A) | 4 | 4 | 0 | 0 | 13 | 0 | +13 | 12 | Advance to Second round | — | 4–0 | 4–0 |
| 2 | Safin Pati (E) | 4 | 2 | 0 | 2 | 2 | 6 | −4 | 6 | Possible Advance to Second round | 0–2 | — | 1–0 |
| 3 | PSD (E) | 4 | 0 | 0 | 4 | 0 | 9 | −9 | 0 | | 1–3 | 0–1 | — |

Updated to match(es) played on unknown. Source: Liga 3 2022 Central Java
(A) Advance to a further round; (E) Eliminated

=== Ranking of runner-up ===
| Pos | Grp | Team | Pld | W | D | L | GF | GA | GD | Pts | Qualification |
|---|---|---|---|---|---|---|---|---|---|---|---|
| 1 | I | Persika (A) | 4 | 3 | 0 | 1 | 10 | 3 | +7 | 9 | Advance to Second round |
| 2 | A | Slawi United (A) | 4 | 2 | 1 | 1 | 9 | 4 | +5 | 7 | Advance to Second round |
| 3 | D | Bhayangkara Muda (A) | 4 | 2 | 1 | 1 | 7 | 4 | +3 | 7 | Advance to Second round |
| 4 | L | PSDB United (A) | 4 | 2 | 1 | 1 | 7 | 5 | +2 | 7 | Advance to Second round |
| 5 | H | PPSM (A) | 4 | 2 | 0 | 2 | 7 | 4 | +3 | 6 | Advance to Second round |
| 6 | B | Persekap (E) | 4 | 2 | 0 | 2 | 10 | 8 | +2 | 6 | |
| 7 | F | Persibas (E) | 4 | 2 | 0 | 2 | 4 | 3 | +1 | 6 | |
| 8 | K | Putra Surakarta (E) | 4 | 1 | 3 | 0 | 4 | 3 | +1 | 6 | |
| 9 | J | AT Farmasi (E) | 4 | 2 | 0 | 2 | 7 | 7 | 0 | 6 | |
| 10 | E | Mahesa Jenar Muda (E) | 4 | 2 | 0 | 2 | 5 | 5 | 0 | 6 | |
| 11 | M | Safin Pati (E) | 4 | 2 | 0 | 2 | 2 | 6 | −4 | 6 | |
| 12 | C | PSISa (E) | 4 | 1 | 2 | 1 | 5 | 4 | +1 | 5 | |
| 13 | G | Persikama (E) | 4 | 0 | 2 | 2 | 3 | 7 | −4 | 2 | |

Updated to match(es) played on unknown. Source: Liga 3 2022 Central Java
(A) Advance to a further round; (E) Eliminated

== Second round ==
The second round matches were held behind closed doors in the following stadiums:

- Group N & O: Citarum Stadium, Semarang
- Group P & Q: Hoegeng Stadium, Pekalongan
- Group R & S: Wergu Wetan Stadium, Kudus

=== Group N ===
| Pos | Team | Pld | W | D | L | GF | GA | GD | Pts | Qualification | PBT | SLA | USU |
|---|---|---|---|---|---|---|---|---|---|---|---|---|---|
| 1 | Persibat (A) | 2 | 2 | 0 | 0 | 3 | 0 | +3 | 6 | Advance to Knockout round | — | | 1–0 |
| 2 | Slawi United (E) | 2 | 1 | 0 | 1 | 1 | 2 | −1 | 3 | Possible Advance to Knockout round | 0–2 | — | |
| 3 | Universitas Surakarta (E) | 2 | 0 | 0 | 2 | 0 | 2 | −2 | 0 | | | 0–1 | — |

Updated to match(es) played on 24 December 2022. Source: Liga 3 2022 Central Java
(A) Advance to a further round; (E) Eliminated
22 December 2022
13.00 WIB (UTC+7)

| Persibat | 1–0 | Universitas Surakarta |
|---|---|---|
| Aji Sapo 6' | Report |

Citarum Stadium, Semarang
Attendance: 0

23 December 2022
13.30 WIB (UTC+7)

| Universitas Surakarta | 0–1 | Slawi United |
|---|---|---|
| | Report | Vederyca 49' |

Citarum Stadium, Semarang
Attendance: 0

24 December 2022
13.00 WIB (UTC+7)

| Slawi United | 0–2 | Persibat |
|---|---|---|
| | Report | M. Irfan 50', 77' |

Citarum Stadium, Semarang
Attendance: 0

=== Group O ===
| Pos | Team | Pld | W | D | L | GF | GA | GD | Pts | Qualification | PRK | WBO | MGL |
|---|---|---|---|---|---|---|---|---|---|---|---|---|---|
| 1 | Persik (A) | 2 | 1 | 1 | 0 | 4 | 2 | +2 | 4 (Note: Tied on head-to-head results. Goal difference: Persik +2, PSIW +1.) | Advance to Knockout round | — | 1–1 | |
| 2 | PSIW (A) | 2 | 1 | 1 | 0 | 3 | 2 | +1 | 4 | Possible Advance to Knockout round | | — | 2–1 |
| 3 | PPSM (E) | 2 | 0 | 0 | 2 | 2 | 5 | −3 | 0 | | 1–3 | | — |

Updated to match(es) played on 24 December 2022. Source: Liga 3 2022 Central Java
(A) Advance to a further round; (E) Eliminated
Notes:
22 December 2022
15.15 WIB (UTC+7)

| Persik | 1–1 | PSIW |
|---|---|---|
| Ibnu Iqbal 88' | Report | Andri 59' (pen.) |

Citarum Stadium, Semarang
Attendance: 0

December 2022
15.30 WIB (UTC+7)

| PSIW | 2–1 | PPSM |
|---|---|---|
| Rizki 23'; Anugerah 54' | Report | Zacky 40' (pen.) |

Citarum Stadium, Semarang
Attendance: 0

December 2022
15.15 WIB (UTC+7)

| PPSM | 1–3 | Persik |
|---|---|---|
| Henry Indra 15' | Report | Kurnia Nanda 45+4'; Jiff Reymon 59'; Riezco A. Kautsar 90' |

Citarum Stadium, Semarang
Attendance: 0

=== Group P ===
| Pos | Team | Pld | W | D | L | GF | GA | GD | Pts | Qualification | PUN | KMN | PTA |
|---|---|---|---|---|---|---|---|---|---|---|---|---|---|
| 1 | PSDB United (A) | 2 | 2 | 0 | 0 | 4 | 2 | +2 | 6 | Advance to Knockout round | — | | 3–2 |
| 2 | Persak (E) | 2 | 1 | 0 | 1 | 2 | 1 | +1 | 3 | Possible Advance to Knockout round | 0–1 | — | |
| 3 | Persitema (E) | 2 | 0 | 0 | 2 | 2 | 5 | −3 | 0 | | | 0–2 | — |

Updated to match(es) played on 24 December 2022. Source: Liga 3 2022 Central Java
(A) Advance to a further round; (E) Eliminated
22 December 2022
13.00 WIB (UTC+7)

| Persitema | 0–2 | Persak |
|---|---|---|
| | Report | Ridwan 12', 18' |

Hoegeng Stadium, Pekalongan
Attendance: 0

23 December 2022
13.30 WIB (UTC+7)

| Persak | 0–1 | PSDB United |
|---|---|---|
| | Report |

Hoegeng Stadium, Pekalongan
Attendance: 0

24 December 2022
13.00 WIB (UTC+7)

| PSDB United | 3–2 | Persitema |
|---|---|---|
| Alsyah Risky 29'; Syaifful Islam 63'; Ferri Syahrul 83' | Report | M. Sholikul 52'; Putra Sukma 90+1' |

Hoegeng Stadium, Pekalongan
Attendance: 0

=== Group Q ===
| Pos | Team | Pld | W | D | L | GF | GA | GD | Pts | Qualification | PRP | PKA | PPR |
|---|---|---|---|---|---|---|---|---|---|---|---|---|---|
| 1 | Persip (A) | 2 | 2 | 0 | 0 | 5 | 0 | +5 | 6 | Advance to Knockout round | — | | 2–0 |
| 2 | Persika (E) | 2 | 1 | 0 | 1 | 3 | 4 | −1 | 3 | Possible Advance to Knockout round | 0–3 | — | |
| 3 | Persipur (E) | 2 | 0 | 0 | 2 | 1 | 5 | −4 | 0 | | | 1–3 | — |

Updated to match(es) played on 24 December 2022. Source: Liga 3 2022 Central Java
(A) Advance to a further round; (E) Eliminated
22 December 2022
15.15 WIB (UTC+7)

| Persip | 2–0 | Persipur |
|---|---|---|
| Aan Priyono 23'; Shandy 83' | Report |

Hoegeng Stadium, Pekalongan
Attendance: 0

23 December 2022
15.30 WIB (UTC+7)

| Persipur | 1–3 | Persika |
|---|---|---|
| Ageng 90' | Report | Dwi 10', 40'; Wimba 76' |

Hoegeng Stadium, Pekalongan
Attendance: 0

24 December 2022
15.15 WIB (UTC+7)

| Persika | 0–3 | Persip |
|---|---|---|
| | Report | Shahih 63', 75'; Elang 78' |

Hoegeng Stadium, Pekalongan
Attendance: 0

=== Group R ===
| Pos | Team | Pld | W | D | L | GF | GA | GD | Pts | Qualification | PSB | KLA | BHA |
|---|---|---|---|---|---|---|---|---|---|---|---|---|---|
| 1 | Persab (A) | 2 | 1 | 1 | 0 | 6 | 0 | +6 | 4 (Note: Tied on head-to-head results. Goal difference: Persab +6, PSIK +2.) | Advance to Knockout round | — | 0–0 | |
| 2 | PSIK (A) | 2 | 1 | 1 | 0 | 2 | 0 | +2 | 4 | Possible Advance to Knockout round | | — | 2–0 |
| 3 | Bhayangkara Muda (E) | 2 | 0 | 0 | 2 | 0 | 8 | −8 | 0 | | 0–6 | | — |

Updated to match(es) played on 24 December 2022. Source: Liga 3 2022 Central Java
(A) Advance to a further round; (E) Eliminated
Notes:
22 December 2022
13.00 WIB (UTC+7)

| Persab | 0–0 | PSIK |
|---|---|---|
| | Report |

Wergu Wetan Stadium, Kudus
Attendance: 0

23 December 2022
13.30 WIB (UTC+7)

| PSIK | 2–0 | Bhayangkara Muda |
|---|---|---|
| Yogi Tri 19'; Arya Seta 66' | Report |

Wergu Wetan Stadium, Kudus
Attendance: 0

24 December 2022
13.00 WIB (UTC+7)

| Bhayangkara Muda | 0–6 | Persab |
|---|---|---|
| | Report | Lintang 11', 18', 50', 86'; Bagus 33'; Bagas 65' |

Wergu Wetan Stadium, Kudus
Attendance: 0

=== Group S ===
| Pos | Team | Pld | W | D | L | GF | GA | GD | Pts | Qualification | RBG | PKU | PMG |
|---|---|---|---|---|---|---|---|---|---|---|---|---|---|
| 1 | PSIR (A) | 2 | 2 | 0 | 0 | 2 | 0 | +2 | 6 | Advance to Knockout round | — | | |
| 2 | Persiku (E) | 2 | 1 | 0 | 1 | 2 | 2 | 0 | 3 | Possible Advance to Knockout round | | — | 2–1 |
| 3 | PSIP (E) | 2 | 0 | 0 | 2 | 1 | 3 | −2 | 0 | | 0–1 | | — |

Updated to match(es) played on 24 December 2022. Source: Liga 3 2022 Central Java
(A) Advance to a further round; (E) Eliminated
22 December 2022
15.15 WIB (UTC+7)

| Persiku | 2–1 | PSIP |
|---|---|---|
| Ahmad Ibnu 25'; Henry 62' | Report | Dedi 8' |

Wergu Wetan Stadium, Kudus
Attendance: 0

23 December 2022
15.30 WIB (UTC+7)

| PSIP | 0–1 | PSIR |
|---|---|---|
| | Report | Muslimin 69' |

Wergu Wetan Stadium, Kudus
Attendance: 0

December 2022
15.15 WIB (UTC+7)

| PSIR | 1–0 | Persiku |
|---|---|---|
| Efendi | Report |

Wergu Wetan Stadium, Kudus
Attendance: 0

=== Ranking of runner-up ===
| Pos | Grp | Team | Pld | W | D | L | GF | GA | GD | Pts | Qualification |
|---|---|---|---|---|---|---|---|---|---|---|---|
| 1 | R | PSIK (A) | 2 | 1 | 1 | 0 | 2 | 0 | +2 | 4 | Advance to Knockout round |
| 2 | O | PSIW (A) | 2 | 1 | 1 | 0 | 3 | 2 | +1 | 4 | Advance to Knockout round |
| 3 | P | Persak (E) | 2 | 1 | 0 | 1 | 2 | 1 | +1 | 3 | |
| 4 | S | Persiku (E) | 2 | 1 | 0 | 1 | 2 | 2 | 0 | 3 | |
| 5 | Q | Persika (E) | 2 | 1 | 0 | 1 | 3 | 4 | −1 | 3 | |
| 6 | N | Slawi United (E) | 2 | 1 | 0 | 1 | 1 | 2 | −1 | 3 | |

Updated to match(es) played on unknown. Source: Liga 3 2022 Central Java
(A) Advance to a further round; (E) Eliminated

== Knockout round ==
If a match is tied after normal playing time, extra time would not be played, and a match would go straight to a penalty shoot-out to determine the winner.

=== Bracket ===
Quarter-finals
26 December – Semarang
Persibat | 0 (3)
PSIK (p) | 0 (5)
26 December – Semarang
Persik | 0
PSDB United | 1
26 December – Pekalongan
Persip | 2
Persab | 1
26 December – Pekalongan
PSIR | 2 (1)
PSIW (p) | 2 (3)

Semi-finals
28 December – Semarang
PSIK | 2
PSDB United | 1
28 December – Pekalongan
Persip | 2
PSIW | 1

Final
30 December – Semarang
PSIK | 1
Persip | 3

=== Quarter-finals ===
26 December 2022
13.00 WIB (UTC+7)

| Persibat | 0–0 | PSIK |
|---|---|---|
| | Report |
Penalties
| | 3–5 |

Citarum Stadium, Semarang
Attendance: 0

26 December 2022
13.00 WIB (UTC+7)

| PSIR | 2–2 | PSIW |
|---|---|---|
| Efendi 8'; Muslimin 14' | Report | Andri Arianto 40', 65' |
Penalties
| | 1–3 |

Hoegeng Stadium, Pekalongan
Attendance: 0

26 December 2022
15.15 WIB (UTC+7)

| Persik | 0–1 | PSDB United |
|---|---|---|
| | Report | Akbar 59' |

Citarum Stadium, Semarang
Attendance: 0

26 December 2022
15.15 WIB (UTC+7)

| Persip | 2–1 | Persab |
|---|---|---|
| Al Ahmad 8' (pen.); Shahih Elang 90+2' | Report | Bagus 27' |

Hoegeng Stadium, Pekalongan
Attendance: 0

=== Semi-finals ===
28 December 2022
14.00 WIB (UTC+7)

| PSIK | 2–1 | PSDB United |
|---|---|---|
| Arya Seta 57'; Abdul Aziz 65' | Report | Rafi Dewantoro 86' (pen.) |

Citarum Stadium, Semarang
Attendance: 0

28 December 2022
14.00 WIB (UTC+7)

| Persip | 2–1 | PSIW |
|---|---|---|
| Bagus Elang 35'; Shahih Elang 55' | Report | Andri Arianto 90+1' |

Hoegeng Stadium, Pekalongan
Attendance: 0

=== Final ===
30 December 2022
14.00 WIB (UTC+7)

| PSIK | 1–3 | Persip |
|---|---|---|
| Rahmat Ali 75' | Report | Shahih Elang 43', 72' (pen.), 86' |

Citarum Stadium, Semarang
Attendance: 0
