= 2023 Liga 3 Central Java =

2023 Liga 3 central Java
Tournament details
- Dates: 5 November 2023 – 13 January 2024
- Teams: 22

Final positions
- Champions: Persip Pekalongan (2nd title)
- Runners-up: Persibangga Purbalingga
- Qualified for: 2023–24 Liga 3 National Phase

Tournament statistics
- Matches played: 87
- Goals scored: 220 (2.53 per match)

The 2023 Liga 3 Central Java is the eighth season of Liga 3 Central Java organized by Asprov PSSI Central Java.

Persip are the defending champion.

== Teams ==
2023 Liga 3 Central Java was attended by 22 teams.

No	Team	Location
1	Persab	Brebes Regency
2	Persegal	Tegal City
3	Persibas	Banyumas Regency
4	PSIP	Pemalang Regency
5	Persibangga	Purbalingga Regency
6	Persekap	Pekalongan Regency
7	Persip	Pekalongan City
8	Persibara	Banjarnegara Regency
9	PSIW	Wonosobo Regency
10	Persik Kendal	Kendal Regency
11	PPSM	Magelang
12	Mahesa Jenar Muda	Semarang City
13	Bina Sentra Semarang	Semarang City
14	PSDB United	Demak Regency
15	Persiku	Kudus Regency
16	Safin Pati	Pati Regency
17	PSIR	Rembang Regency
18	Persipur	Grobogan Regency
19	Sragen United	Sragen Regency
20	Persika	Karanganyar Regency
21	PSIK	Klaten Regency
22	Universitas Surakarta	Surakarta City

== First round ==
=== Group A ===
Pos	Team	Pld	W	D	L	GF	GA	GD	Pts	Qualification
1	Persik Kendal	4	4	0	0	16	3	+13	12	Advance to Second round
2	Bina Sentra Semarang	4	1	1	2	8	7	+1	4	Advance to Second round
3	Mahesa Jenar Muda	4	0	1	3	5	19	−14	1	

Source: 2023 Liga 3 Central Java
5 November 2023
15.15 WIB

Persik Kendal	4–0	Bina Sentra Semarang
	Report

Kebondalem Stadium, Kendal Regency

8 November 2023
15.15 WIB

Bina Sentra Semarang	1–1	Mahesa Jenar Muda
	Report

Wisesa Soccer Field, Demak Regency

12 November 2023
15.15 WIB

Persik Kendal	4–1	Mahesa Jenar Muda
	Report

Kebondalem Stadium, Kendal Regency

15 November 2023
15.15 WIB

Bina Sentra Semarang	0–1	Persik Kendal
	Report

Kebondalem Stadium, Kendal Regency

19 November 2023
15.00 WIB

Mahesa Jenar Muda	2–7	Persik Kendal
	Report

Wisesa Soccer Field, Demak Regency

22 November 2023
15.15 WIB

Mahesa Jenar Muda	1–7	Bina Sentra Semarang
	Report

Wisesa Soccer Field, Demak Regency

=== Group B ===
Pos	Team	Pld	W	D	L	GF	GA	GD	Pts	Qualification
1	PSIP	6	4	2	0	14	4	+10	14	Advance to Second round
2	Persab	6	4	1	1	11	4	+7	13	Advance to Second round
3	Persegal	6	1	1	4	5	15	−10	4	
4	Persekap	6	0	2	4	1	8	−7	2	

Source: 2023 Liga 3 Central Java
5 November 2023
15.15 WIB

PSIP	4–1	Persegal
	Report

Mochtar Stadium, Pemalang Regency
5 November 2023
15.15 WIB

Persab	1–0	Persekap
	Report

Karangbirahi Stadium, Brebes Regency

8 November 2023
15.15 WIB

Persegal	0–3	Persab
	Report

Yos Sudarso Stadium, Tegal City
8 November 2023
15.15 WIB

Persekap	0–3	PSIP
	Report

Widya Mandala Krida Stadium, Pekalongan Regency

12 November 2023
15.15 WIB

PSIP	2–2	Persab
	Report

Mochtar Stadium, Pemalang Regency
12 November 2023
15.15 WIB

Persegal	0–0	Persekap
	Report

Yos Sudarso Stadium, Tegal City

15 November 2023
15.15 WIB

Persab	0–1	PSIP
	Report

Karangbirahi Stadium, Brebes Regency
15 November 2023
15.15 WIB

Persekap	1–2	Persegal
	Report

Widya Mandala Krida Stadium, Pekalongan Regency

19 November 2023
15.15 WIB

Persekap	0–2	Persab
	Report

Widya Mandala Krida Stadium, Pekalongan Regency
19 November 2023
15.15 WIB

Persegal	1–4	PSIP
	Report

Yos Sudarso Stadium, Tegal City

22 November 2023
15.15 WIB

Persab	3–1	Persegal
	Report

Karangbirahi Stadium, Brebes Regency
22 November 2023
15.15 WIB

PSIP	0–0	Persekap
	Report

Mochtar Stadium, Pemalang Regency

=== Group C ===
Pos	Team	Pld	W	D	L	GF	GA	GD	Pts	Qualification
1	PSIK	6	4	1	1	8	3	+5	13	Advance to Second round
2	Universitas Surakarta	6	3	1	2	7	5	+2	10	Advance to Second round
3	Persika	6	2	1	3	4	5	−1	7	
4	Persipur	6	0	3	3	2	8	−6	3	

Source: 2023 Liga 3 Central Java
5 November 2023
15.15 WIB

Persika	0–2	Universitas Surakarta
	Report

Angkatan 45 Karanganyar Stadium, Karanganyar Regency
5 November 2023
15.15 WIB

PSIK	3–0	Persipur
	Report

Trikoyo Stadium, Klaten Regency

8 November 2023
15.15 WIB

Universitas Surakarta	1–2	PSIK
	Report

Trikoyo Stadium, Klaten Regency
8 November 2023
15.15 WIB

Persipur	0–1	Persika
	Report

Krida Bakti Stadium, Grobogan Regency

12 November 2023
15.15 WIB

Universitas Surakarta	2–0	Persipur
	Report

Trikoyo Stadium, Klaten Regency
12 November 2023
15.15 WIB

Persika	2–0	PSIK
	Report

Angkatan 45 Karanganyar Stadium, Karanganyar Regency

15 November 2023
15.15 WIB

Persipur	1–1	Universitas Surakarta
	Report

Krida Bakti Stadium, Grobogan Regency
15 November 2023
15.15 WIB

PSIK	1–0	Persika
	Report

Trikoyo Stadium, Klaten Regency

19 November 2023
15.15 WIB

Persipur	0–0	PSIK
	Report

Krida Bakti Stadium, Grobogan Regency
19 November 2023
15.15 WIB

Universitas Surakarta	1–0	Persika
	Report

Trikoyo Stadium, Klaten Regency

22 November 2023
15.15 WIB

Persika	1–1	Persipur
	Report

Angkatan 45 Karanganyar Stadium, Karanganyar Regency
22 November 2023
15.15 WIB

PSIK	2–0	Universitas Surakarta
	Report

Trikoyo Stadium, Klaten Regency

=== Group D ===
Pos	Team	Pld	W	D	L	GF	GA	GD	Pts	Qualification
1	PSDB United	6	5	0	1	9	2	+7	15	Advance to Second round
2	Persiku	6	4	0	2	10	4	+6	12	Advance to Second round
3	PSIR	6	3	0	3	8	6	+2	9	
4	Safin Pati	6	0	0	6	2	17	−15	0	

Source: 2023 Liga 3 Central Java
5 November 2023
15.15 WIB

PSDB United	2–0	Persiku
	Report

Sultan Fatah Stadium, Demak Regency
5 November 2023
15.15 WIB

Safin Pati	1–4	PSIR
	Report

Gelora Soekarno Mojoagung Stadium, Pati Regency

8 November 2023
15.15 WIB

Persiku	3–0	Safin Pati
	Report

Wergu Wetan Stadium, Kudus Regency
8 November 2023
15.15 WIB

PSIR	0–1	PSDB United
	Report

Krida Stadium, Rembang Regency

12 November 2023
15.15 WIB

Persiku	1–0	PSIR
	Report

Wergu Wetan Stadium, Kudus Regency
12 November 2023
15.15 WIB

PSDB United	3–0	Safin Pati
	Report

Sultan Fatah Stadium, Demak Regency

15 November 2023
15.15 WIB

PSIR	2–1	Persiku
	Report

Krida Stadium, Rembang Regency
15 November 2023
15.15 WIB

Safin Pati	0–2	PSDB United
	Report

Gelora Soekarno Mojoagung Stadium, Pati Regency

19 November 2023
15.15 WIB

PSIR	2–1	Safin Pati
	Report

Krida Stadium, Rembang Regency
19 November 2023
15.15 WIB

Persiku	2–0	PSDB United
	Report

Wergu Wetan Stadium, Kudus Regency

22 November 2023
15.15 WIB

PSDB United	1–0	PSIR
	Report

Sultan Fatah Stadium, Demak Regency
22 November 2023
15.15 WIB

Safin Pati	0–3	Persiku
	Report

Gelora Soekarno Mojoagung Stadium, Pati Regency

=== Group E ===
Pos	Team	Pld	W	D	L	GF	GA	GD	Pts	Qualification
1	Persibangga	4	2	1	1	3	1	+2	7	Advance to Second round
2	PSIW	4	2	1	1	2	1	+1	7	Advance to Second round
3	Persibara	4	0	2	2	0	3	−3	2	
4	Persibas (D)	0	0	0	0	0	0	0	0	Disqualified

Source: 2023 Liga 3 Central Java
(D) Disqualified
5 November 2023
15.15 WIB

Persibas	~~0–0~~ Canceled	PSIW
	Report

Satria Stadium, Banyumas Regency
5 November 2023
15.15 WIB

Persibara	0–2	Persibangga
	Report

Soemitro Kolopaking Stadium, Banjarnegara Regency

8 November 2023
15.00 WIB

PSIW	1–0	Persibara
	Report

Tanggulasi Stadium, Wonosobo Regency
8 November 2023
15.15 WIB

Persibangga	~~2–0~~ Canceled	Persibas
	Report

Goentoer Darjono Stadium, Purbalingga Regency

12 November 2023
15.00 WIB

PSIW	1–0	Persibangga
	Report

Tanggulasi Stadium, Wonosobo Regency
12 November 2023
15.15 WIB

Persibas	~~1–2~~ Canceled	Persibara
	Report

Satria Stadium, Banyumas Regency

15 November 2023
15.15 WIB

Persibangga	1–0	PSIW
	Report

Goentoer Darjono Stadium, Purbalingga Regency
15 November 2023
15.15 WIB

Persibara	~~2–1~~ Canceled	Persibas
	Report

Soemitro Kolopaking Stadium, Banjarnegara Regency

19 November 2023
15.00 WIB

PSIW	~~1–0~~ Canceled	Persibas
	Report

Tanggulasi Stadium, Wonosobo Regency
19 November 2023
15.15 WIB

Persibangga	0–0	Persibara
	Report

Goentoer Darjono Stadium, Purbalingga Regency

22 November 2023
15.15 WIB

Persibara	0–0	PSIW
	Report

Soemitro Kolopaking Stadium, Banjarnegara Regency
22 November 2023
15.15 WIB

Persibas	~~1–1~~ Canceled	Persibangga
	Report

Satria Stadium, Banyumas Regency

The match was stopped at '80 due to a supporters' riot.

=== Group F ===
Pos	Team	Pld	W	D	L	GF	GA	GD	Pts	Qualification
1	Persip	2	1	1	0	4	3	+1	4	Advance to Second round
2	Sragen United	2	0	1	1	3	4	−1	1	Advance to Second round
3	PPSM (D)	0	0	0	0	0	0	0	0	

Source: 2023 Liga 3 Central Java
(D) Disqualified
5 November 2023
15.15 WIB

Persip	~~4–1~~ Canceled	PPSM
	Report

Hoegeng Stadium, Pekalongan City

8 November 2023
15.15 WIB

PPSM	~~2–2~~ Canceled	Sragen United
	Report

Moch. Soebroto Stadium, Magelang City

12 November 2023
15.15 WIB

Persip	2–2	Sragen United
	Report

Hoegeng Stadium, Pekalongan City

15 November 2023
15.15 WIB

Sragen United	1–2	Persip
	Report

Angkatan 45 Karanganyar Stadium, Karanganyar Regency

19 November 2023
15.15 WIB

Sragen United	~~3–1~~ Canceled	PPSM
	Report

Taruna Stadium, Sragen Regency

22 November 2023
15.15 WIB

PPSM	~~1–1~~ Canceled	Persip
	Report

Moch. Soebroto Stadium, Magelang City

The match was stopped at '85 due to a supporters' riot.

== Second round ==
=== Group G ===
Pos	Team	Pld	W	D	L	GF	GA	GD	Pts	Qualification
1	Universitas Surakarta	4	3	0	1	9	4	+5	9	Advance to Knockout round
2	Persibangga	4	1	1	2	3	4	−1	4 (Note: Head-to-head points: Persibangga 4, Persik Kendal 1.)	Advance to Knockout round
3	Persik Kendal	4	1	1	2	3	7	−4	4	

Source: 2023 Liga 3 Central Java
Notes:
29 November 2023
15.15 WIB

Persik Kendal	0–0	Persibangga
	Report

Kebondalem Stadium, Kendal Regency

3 December 2023
15.15 WIB

Persibangga	1–2	Universitas Surakarta
	Report

Goentoer Darjono Stadium, Purbalingga Regency

6 December 2023
15.15 WIB

Universitas Surakarta	3–0	Persik Kendal
	Report

Trikoyo Stadium, Klaten Regency

10 December 2023
15.15 WIB

Persik Kendal	3–2	Universitas Surakarta
	Report

Kebondalem Stadium, Kendal Regency

13 December 2023
15.15 WIB

Persibangga	2–0	Persik Kendal
	Report

Goentoer Darjono Stadium, Purbalingga Regency

17 December 2023
15.15 WIB

Universitas Surakarta	2–0	Persibangga
	Report

Trikoyo Stadium, Klaten Regency

=== Group H ===
Pos	Team	Pld	W	D	L	GF	GA	GD	Pts	Qualification
1	Persip	4	2	1	1	6	3	+3	7	Advance to Knockout round
2	Persiku	4	2	0	2	4	9	−5	6	Advance to Knockout round
3	PSIP	4	1	1	2	6	4	+2	4	

Source: 2023 Liga 3 Central Java
29 November 2023
15.15 WIB

PSIP	1–1	Persip
	Report

Mochtar Stadium, Pemalang Regency

3 December 2023
15.15 WIB

Persip	3–0	Persiku
	Report

Hoegeng Stadium, Pekalongan City

6 December 2023
15.15 WIB

Persiku	2–1	PSIP
	Report

Wergu Wetan Stadium, Kudus Regency

10 December 2023
15.15 WIB

PSIP	4–0	Persiku
	Report

Mochtar Stadium, Pemalang Regency

13 December 2023
15.15 WIB

Persip	1–0	PSIP
	Report

Hoegeng Stadium, Pekalongan City

17 December 2023
15.15 WIB

Persiku	2–1	Persip
	Report

Wergu Wetan Stadium, Kudus Regency

=== Group I ===
Pos	Team	Pld	W	D	L	GF	GA	GD	Pts	Qualification
1	PSIK	4	4	0	0	12	4	+8	12	Advance to Knockout round
2	PSIW	4	2	0	2	8	7	+1	6	Advance to Knockout round
3	Bina Sentra Semarang	4	0	0	4	2	11	−9	0	

Source: 2023 Liga 3 Central Java
29 November 2023
15.15 WIB

PSIK	3–0	Bina Sentra Semarang
	Report

Trikoyo Stadium, Klaten Regency

1 December 2023
15.15 WIB

Bina Sentra Semarang	1–3	PSIW
	Report

Wisesa Soccer Field, Demak Regency

6 December 2023
15.15 WIB

PSIW	2–3	PSIK
	Report

Tanggulasi Stadium, Wonosobo Regency

10 December 2023
15.15 WIB

PSIK	3–1	PSIW
	Report

Trikoyo Stadium, Klaten Regency

13 December 2023
15.15 WIB

Bina Sentra Semarang	1–3	PSIK
	Report

Wisesa Soccer Field, Demak Regency

17 December 2023
15.15 WIB

PSIW	2–0	Bina Sentra Semarang
	Report

Tanggulasi Stadium, Wonosobo Regency

=== Group J ===
Pos	Team	Pld	W	D	L	GF	GA	GD	Pts	Qualification
1	Persab	4	2	1	1	5	5	0	7	Advance to Knockout round
2	PSDB United	4	1	2	1	4	3	+1	5	Advance to Knockout round
3	Sragen United	4	1	1	2	3	4	−1	4	

Source: 2023 Liga 3 Central Java
29 November 2023
15.15 WIB

PSDB United	2–2	Persab
	Report

Sultan Fatah Stadium, Demak Regency

3 December 2023
15.15 WIB

Persab	1–0	Sragen United
	Report

Karangbirahi Stadium, Brebes Regency

6 December 2023
15.15 WIB

Sragen United	0–0	PSDB United
	Report

Angkatan 45 Karanganyar Stadium, Karanganyar Regency

10 December 2023
15.15 WIB

PSDB United	2–0	Sragen United
	Report

Sultan Fatah Stadium, Demak Regency

13 December 2023
15.15 WIB

Persab	1–0	PSDB United
	Report

Karangbirahi Stadium, Brebes Regency

17 December 2023
15.15 WIB

Sragen United	3–1	Persab
	Report

Angkatan 45 Karanganyar Stadium, Karanganyar Regency

== Knockout round ==
=== Bracket ===
If a match was tied on aggregate score after two legs, no extra time would be played, and a penalty shoot-out would be held to determine the winner.

Quarter-finals
G1	Universitas Surakarta	3	0	3 (4)
J2	PSDB United (p)	0	3	3 (5)
H1	Persip Pekalongan	3	2	5
I2	PSIW Wonosobo	1	1	2
I1	PSIK Klaten	0	0	0
H2	Persiku Kudus	2	1	3
J1	Persab Brebes	0	1	1
G2	Persibangga Purbalingga	2	1	3

Semi-finals
PSDB United	1	0	1
Persip Pekalongan	1	3	4
Persiku Kudus	3	1	4 (4)
Persibangga Purbalingga (p)	2	2	4 (5)

Final
Persip Pekalongan	0 (4)
Persibangga Purbalingga	0 (2)

=== Quarter-finals ===
==== Summary ====
The first legs will be played on 23 December 2023, and the second legs will be played on 27 December 2023.

Team 1	Agg.	Team 2	1st leg	2nd leg
Universitas Surakarta	3–3 (4–5 p)	PSDB United	3–0	0–3
Persip	5–2	PSIW	3–1	2–1
PSIK	0–3	Persiku	0–2	0–1
Persab	1–3	Persibangga	0–2	1–1

==== Matches ====
23 December 2023
15.15 WIB

Universitas Surakarta	3–0	PSDB United
	Report

Banyuanyar Soccer Field, Surakarta City
27 December 2023
15.15 WIB

PSDB United	3–0	Universitas Surakarta
	Report
Penalties
	5–4

Sultan Fatah Stadium, Demak Regency

3–3 on aggregate. PSDB United won 5–4 on penalties.

23 December 2023
15.15 WIB

Persip	3–1	PSIW
	Report

Hoegeng Stadium, Pekalongan City
27 December 2023
15.00 WIB

PSIW	1–2	Persip
	Report

Tanggulasi Stadium, Wonosobo Regency

Persip won 5–2 on aggregate.

23 December 2023
15.15 WIB

PSIK	0–2	Persiku
	Report

Trikoyo Stadium, Klaten Regency
27 December 2023
15.15 WIB

Persiku	1–0	PSIK
	Report

Wergu Wetan Stadium, Kudus Regency

Persiku won 3–0 on aggregate.

23 December 2023
15.15 WIB

Persab	0–2	Persibangga
	Report

Karangbirahi Stadium, Brebes Regency
27 December 2023
15.15 WIB

Persibangga	1–1	Persab
	Report

Goentoer Darjono Stadium, Purbalingga Regency

Persibangga won 3–1 on aggregate.

=== Semi-finals ===
==== Summary ====
Team 1	Agg.	Team 2	1st leg	2nd leg
PSDB United	1–4	Persip	1–1	0–3
Persiku	4–4 (4–5 p)	Persibangga	3–2	1–2

==== Matches ====
3 January 2024
15.15 WIB

PSDB United	1–1	Persip
	Report

Sultan Fatah Stadium, Demak Regency
6 January 2024
15.15 WIB

Persip	3–0	PSDB United
	Report

Hoegeng Stadium, Pekalongan City

Persip won 4–1 on aggregate.

3 January 2024
15.15 WIB

Persiku	3–2	Persibangga
	Report

Wergu Wetan Stadium, Kudus Regency
6 January 2024
15.15 WIB

Persibangga	2–1	Persiku
	Report
Penalties
	5–4

Goentoer Darjono Stadium, Purbalingga Regency

4–4 on aggregate. Persibangga won 5–4 on penalties.

=== Final ===
13 January 2024
14.30 WIB

Persip	0–0	Persibangga
	Report
Penalties
	4–2

Jatidiri Stadium, Semarang City

== Qualification to the national phase ==
Free slot

Team	Method of qualification	Date of qualification	Qualified to
Persip	[[Champions of 2022 Liga 3 Central Java]]	30 December 2022	2023–24 Liga 3 National Phase
PSIK	[[Runner-up of 2022 Liga 3 Central Java]]	30 December 2022	2023–24 Liga 3 National Phase
PSIW Wonosobo	[[Semi-finalist of 2022 Liga 3 Central Java]]	30 December 2022	2023–24 Liga 3 National Phase
PSDB United	[[Semi-finalist of 2022 Liga 3 Central Java]]	30 December 2022	2023–24 Liga 3 National Phase

2023 season

Team	Method of qualification	Date of qualification	Qualified to
Persibangga	Finalist of 2023 Liga 3 Central Java	6 January 2024	2023–24 Liga 3 National Phase
Persiku Kudus	Semi-finalist of 2023 Liga 3 Central Java	27 December 2023	2023–24 Liga 3 National Phase
Universitas Surakarta	Quarter-finalist of 2023 Liga 3 Central Java	27 December 2023	2023–24 Liga 3 National Phase
Persab	Quarter-finalist of 2023 Liga 3 Central Java	27 December 2023	2023–24 Liga 3 National Phase

== See also ==
- 2023 Liga 3 Banten
- 2023 Liga 3 Jakarta
- 2023 Liga 3 West Java Series 1
- 2023 Liga 3 Special Region of Yogyakarta
- 2023 Liga 3 East Java
