= 2019 Liga 3 Central Java =

Liga 3 Jawa Tengah
- Season: 2019
- Champions: Persiku Kudus

The 2019 Liga 3 Central Java is the third edition of Liga 3 (formerly known as Liga Nusantara) Central Java as a qualifying round for the national round of 2019 Liga 3. PSIP Pemalang, winner of the 2018 Liga 3 Central Java are the defending champions. The competition began on 14 July 2018.

== Format ==
In this competition, 20 teams are divided into 4 groups of four or five. The two best teams are through to knockout stage. The winner will represent Central Java in the national round of 2019 Liga 3.

== Teams ==
There are 20 clubs which will participate the league in this season.

== Group stage ==
This stage started on 14 July 2019.

=== Group A ===
Pos	Team	Pld	W	D	L	GF	GA	GD	Pts	Qualification
1	Persekat Tegal	8	5	3	0	11	3	+8	18	Advance to next round
2	Persiku Kudus	8	4	3	1	12	5	+7	15	Advance to next round
3	PSD Demak	8	2	3	3	8	11	−3	9	
4	Berlian Rajawali	8	1	3	4	11	15	−4	6	
5	Persibangga Purbalingga	8	1	2	5	5	13	−8	5	

Updated to match(es) played on 29 June 2019 (complete). Source: Drawing PSSI Jateng

=== Group B ===
Pos	Team	Pld	W	D	L	GF	GA	GD	Pts	Qualification
1	Persip Pekalongan (A)	8	8	0	0	16	1	+15	24	Advance to next round
2	Persibas Banyumas	8	2	4	2	5	6	−1	10	Advance to next round
3	Persipa Pati	8	2	3	3	7	7	0	9	
4	Persipur Purwodadi	8	1	3	4	7	13	−6	6	
5	Persikama Magelang	8	0	4	4	1	9	−8	4	

Updated to match(es) played on 29 June 2019 (complete). Source: Drawing PSSI Jateng
(A) Advance to a further round

=== Group C ===
Pos	Team	Pld	W	D	L	GF	GA	GD	Pts	Qualification
1	PSIP Pemalang	8	5	1	2	9	5	+4	16	Advance to next round
2	Persebi Boyolali	8	5	1	2	7	3	+4	16	Advance to next round
3	Persitema Temanggung	8	3	3	2	7	5	+2	12	
4	PSISra Sragen	8	1	3	4	2	4	−2	6	
5	Persegal Tegal	8	1	2	5	3	11	−8	5	

Updated to match(es) played on 29 June 2019 (complete). Source: Drawing PSSI Jateng

=== Group D ===
Pos	Team	Pld	W	D	L	GF	GA	GD	Pts	Qualification
1	Persab Brebes	6	4	1	1	6	2	+4	13	Advance to next round
2	PPSM Sakti Magelang	6	3	0	3	9	8	+1	9	Advance to next round
3	Persikaba Blora	6	2	2	2	4	6	−2	8	
4	Persak Kebumen	6	1	1	4	6	9	−3	4	

Updated to match(es) played on 29 June 2019 (complete). Source: Drawing PSSI Jateng
