= 2014 Liga Nusantara Central Java =

Liga Nusantara Central Java
- Season: 2014

The 2014 Liga Nusantara Central Java season is the first edition of Liga Nusantara Central Java is a qualifying round of the 2014 Liga Nusantara.

The competition scheduled starts in May 2014.

== Teams ==
This season there are 9 Central Java club participants, divided into 2 group of 4 and 5.

Group A
Persak Kebumen
Persibara Banjarnegara
Persikaba Blora
Berlian Rajawali F.C. Semarang

Group B
Persab Brebes
PSIP Pemalang
Persekap Kabupaten Pekalongan
Persikas Kabupaten Semarang
PSD Demak

== League table ==
Divided into 2 group of 4 and 5, winner and runner-up of each group qualify for the semi-final 2014 Liga Nusantara Central Java.

Group A

Pos	Team	Pld	W	D	L		Pts
1	Persibara Banjarnegara	6	2	3	1	(7-6)	9
2	Persikaba Blora	6	2	3	1	(8-4)	9
3	Berlian Rajawali FC Semarang	6	1	4	1	(8-9)	7
4	Persak Kebumen	6	1	2	3	(6-10)	5

Group B

Pos	Team	Pld	W	D	L		Pts
1	Persab Brebes	8	5	3	0	(9-1)	18
2	Persekap Pekalongan Regency	8	3	4	1	(7-3)	13
3	PSD Demak	8	3	3	2	(5-5)	12
4	PSIP Pemalang	8	1	3	4	(2-8)	6
5	Persikas Semarang Regency	8	1	1	6	(3-9)	4
