= 2017 Liga 3 Central Java =

Liga 3 Central Java
- Season: 2017
- Champions: Persik Kendal
- Promoted: Liga 2

The 2017 Liga 3 Central Java season is the third edition of Liga 3 Central Java is a qualifying round of the 2017 Liga 3. Persiku Kudus are the defending champions.

The competition scheduled starts in April 2017.

== Teams ==
This season there are 14 Central Java club participants, divided into 3 group of 4 and 5.

Group A
Persiku Kudus
Persis Gotong Royong
Persikaba Blora
Persikama Kabupaten Magelang
Persab Brebes

Group B
PSISra Sragen
PSIP Pemalang
Persekap Kabupaten Pekalongan
Persekat Kabupaten Tegal
PSD Demak

Group C
Persik Kendal
Persebi Boyolali
Persiharjo UNSA-ASMI F.C.
Berlian Rajawali F.C.

== First round ==
Divided into 3 group of 4 and 5, winner and runner-up of each group qualify for the semi-final 2017 Liga 3 Central Java.

Group A

Pos	Team	Pld	W	D	L		Pts
1	Persiku Kudus	8	5	3	0	9-1	18
2	Persis GR	8	5	3	0	8-1	18
3	Persab Brebes	8	2	2	5	5-7	8
4	Persikama Magelang Regency	8	2	2	4	5-9	8
5	Persikaba Blora	8	0	2	6	1-9	2

Group B

Pos	Team	Pld	W	D	L		Pts
1	Persekap Pekalongan Regency	8	5	2	1	18-6	17
2	PSISra Sragen	8	5	1	2	6-6	16
3	PSIP Pemalang	8	4	2	2	14-8	14
4	PSD Demak	8	1	3	4	11-15	6
5	Persekat Tegal	8	1	0	7	6-20	3

Group C

Pos	Team	Pld	W	D	L		Pts
1	Persik Kendal	6	4	2	0	11-2	14
2	Persebi Boyolali	6	4	2	0	8-4	14
3	Berlian Rajawali FC Semarang	6	1	0	5	3-8	3
4	Persiharjo UNSA-ASMI	6	1	0	5	2-10	3

== Second round ==
Group D

Pos	Team	Pld	W	D	L		Pts
1	Persik Kendal	4	1	3	0	4-3	6
2	PSISra Sragen	4	1	2	1	3-4	5
3	Persiku Kudus	4	1	1	2	3-3	4

Group E

Pos	Team	Pld	W	D	L		Pts
1	Persis GR	4	3	0	1	8-4	9
2	Persekap Pekalongan Regency	4	1	1	2	7-8	4
3	Persebi Boyolali	4	1	1	2	4-7	4
