= Prabowo (name) =

Prabowo is an Indonesian name. Notable people with the name include:

- Prabowo Subianto (born 1951), Indonesian president.
- Edhy Prabowo (born 1972), politician.
- Listyo Sigit Prabowo (born 1969), police officer.
- Andesi Setyo Prabowo (born 1989), footballer.
- Hari Prabowo (born 1976), diplomat.
- Ryuji Utomo Prabowo (born 1995), footballer.
