= Safin Pati F.C. =

Association football team in Indonesia

Safin Pati FC
- Full name: Safin Pati Football Club
- Nickname: The Juwana Milkfish
- Short name: SPFC, SAF
- Founded: 2022; 4 years ago
- Ground: Gelora Soekarno Mojoagung Stadium; Pati, Central Java
- Capacity: 5,000
- Owner: Saiful Arifin
- CEO: Borgo Pane
- Manager: Ariel Fhebriany
- Coach: Parlindungan Tambunan
- League: Liga 4
- 2023: 4th in Group D, (Central Java zone)
- Website: https://www.safinpati.sch.id/
Home colours	Away colours	Third colours

Safin Pati Football Club (simply known as Safin Pati) is an Indonesian football club based in Trangkil, Pati, Central Java. They currently compete in the Liga 4.

== History ==
In June 2021, the founder, Saiful Arifin sold his club from Pati which was then competing in Liga 2, PSG Pati, to a YouTuber Atta Halilintar and entrepreneur Putra Siregar who later changed its name to AHHA PS Pati and later changed its name to F.C. Bekasi City and moved its homebase in Bekasi, due to moving the club to another city, Saiful Arifin decided to re-establish the club from Pati Regency.

In 2022, Saiful Arifin bought back the license of the Liga 3 East Java club from Magetan Regency, Putra Surya Magetan Connection, and changed its name to Safin Pati FC and moved its homebase to Pati Regency. Through the PSSI Central Java Asprov (Association Province) congress on 16 July 2022 in Semarang, Safin Pati FC has officially become a member of the PSSI Central Java Asprov and will make its debut in 2022 Liga 3 Central Java.

On 28 September 2022, Safin Pati made their first league match debut in a 1–0 win against PSD Demak at the University of Diponegoro Stadium, This victory brought Safin Pati in line with PSIR Rembang's point acquisition, which was three points, however PSIR was ahead on goal difference after winning over PSD Demak with a score of 4–0 in Rembang Regency on 25 September 2022.

== Season-by-season records ==
Season(s)	League/Division	Tms.	Pos.	Piala Indonesia
2022–23	Liga 3	season abandoned		–
2023–24	Liga 3	80	Eliminated in Provincial round	–
2024–25				
2025–26	Liga 4	64	Eliminated in Provincial round	–

== Coaching staff ==
Position	Staff
Head Coach	(Indonesia) Parlindungan Tambunan
Assistant Coach	(Indonesia) Johan Panggabean
Physical Coach	(Indonesia) Troy Medicana
Goalkeeper Coach	(Indonesia) Sumiran

=== Management ===
Chief Executive Officer	(Indonesia) Borgo Pane
Manager	(Indonesia) Ariel Fhebriany
