= 2018 Liga 3 Central Java =

Liga 3 Jawa Tengah
- Season: 2018
- Champions: PSIP Pemalang

The 2018 Liga 3 Central Java is the third edition of Liga 3 (formerly known as Liga Nusantara) Central Java as a qualifying round for the national round of 2018 Liga 3. Persik Kendal (now in 2018 Liga 2), winner of the 2017 Liga 3 Central Java are the defending champions. The competition began on 25 March 2018.

== Format ==
In this competition, 17 teams are divided into 4 groups of four or five. The two best teams are through to knockout stage. The winner will represent Central Java in the national round of 2018 Liga 3.

== Teams ==
There are 17 clubs which will participate the league in this season.

== Group stage ==
This stage started on 25 March 2018.

=== Group A ===
Pos	Team	Pld	W	D	L	GF	GA	GD	Pts	Qualification
1	Persekat Tegal (A)	8	5	3	0	21	9	+12	18	Advance to next round
2	Persibara Banjarnegara (A)	8	5	2	1	14	8	+6	17	Advance to next round
3	Persiku Kudus (E)	8	4	1	3	20	8	+12	13	
4	Persipa Pati (E)	8	3	0	5	7	20	−13	9	
5	PSIK Klaten (E)	8	0	0	8	2	19	−17	0	

Updated to match(es) played on 29 April 2018 (complete). Source: MD-1MD-2MD-3MD-4MD-5MD-6MD-7MD-8MD-9MD-10Klasemen Akhir PSSI Jateng
(A) Advance to a further round; (E) Eliminated

=== Group B ===
Pos	Team	Pld	W	D	L	GF	GA	GD	Pts	Qualification
1	PSIP Pemalang (A)	6	4	2	0	13	5	+8	14	Advance to next round
2	PSD Demak (A)	6	3	2	1	6	5	+1	11	Advance to next round
3	Persebi Boyolali (E)	6	1	2	3	9	10	−1	5	
4	BJL 2000 Semarang (E)	6	1	0	5	3	11	−8	3	

Updated to match(es) played on 29 April 2018 (complete). Source: MD-1MD-2MD-3MD-4MD-5MD-6Klasemen Akhir PSSI Jateng
(A) Advance to a further round; (E) Eliminated

=== Group C ===
Pos	Team	Pld	W	D	L	GF	GA	GD	Pts	Qualification
1	Bhayangkara Muda (A)	6	3	2	1	8	6	+2	11	Advance to next round
2	BR UNIKA (A)	6	1	4	1	6	5	+1	7 (Note: Head-to-head results: BR Unika 3–1 Persiharjo, Persiharjo 2–2 BR Unika.)	Advance to next round
3	Persiharjo Sukoharjo (E)	6	2	1	3	10	9	+1	7	
4	Persikaba Blora (E)	6	1	3	2	5	9	−4	6	

Updated to match(es) played on 29 April 2018 (complete). Source: MD-1MD-2MD-3MD-4MD-5MD-6Klasemen Akhir PSSI Jateng
(A) Advance to a further round; (E) Eliminated

=== Group D ===
Pos	Team	Pld	W	D	L	GF	GA	GD	Pts	Qualification
1	Persab Brebes (A)	6	4	2	0	8	3	+5	14	Advance to next round
2	Persitema Temanggung (A)	6	3	0	3	6	4	+2	9	Advance to next round
3	Persekap Pekalongan (E)	6	1	2	3	4	8	−4	5	
4	Persikama Magelang (E)	6	1	2	3	2	5	−3	5	

Updated to match(es) played on 29 April 2018 (complete). Source: MD-1MD-2MD-3MD-4MD-5MD-6Klasemen Akhir PSSI Jateng
(A) Advance to a further round; (E) Eliminated

== Knockout stage ==
Quarter-finals
Persibara Banjarnegara	1	1	2
Bhayangkara Muda	0	2	2
PSD Demak	3	1	4(3)
Persab Brebes	1	3	4(4)
BR Unika	0	1	1
Persekat Tegal	0	1	1
Persitema Temanggung	0	0	0
PSIP Pemalang	2	1	3

Semi-finals
Persibara Banjarnegara	1	1	2
Persab Brebes	0	0	0
BR Unika	0	0	0
PSIP Pemalang	4	2	6

Final
Persibara Banjarnegara	0(4)
PSIP Pemalang	0(5)
