= Sragen United F.C. =

Indonesian football club

Sragen United
- Full name: Sragen United Football Club
- Nickname: The Java Mammoths
- Short name: SRA
- Founded: 2014; 12 years ago as Gelanggang Olahraga (Laga) FC; 2017; 9 years ago as Sragen United
- Ground: Tri Joang 45 Stadium
- Capacity: 10,000
- Owner: PT JYM Karya Indonesia
- Chairman: Juliyatmono
- Head coach: Anom Putrantoro
- League: Liga 4
- 2023: 3rd in Group J (Central Java zone)
Home colours	Away colours

Sragen United Football Club (also known as Sragen United) was an Indonesian football team based in Sragen, Central Java. They currently compete in the Liga 4 Central Java Zone.

== History ==
=== Laga FC ===
Laga FC playing at the professional level Liga Indonesia Premier Division after promotion from Liga Nusantara 2014. At the beginning of the Laga FC containing the majority of players - players East Java Pra PON contingent. When appearing in the Liga Indonesia Premier Division, Laga FC coached, Uston Nawawi under the leadership of Chairman Dr. Wardi Azhari Siagian. Accomplishments ever achieved for the name Laga FC is a runners-up Liga Nusantara 2014. When he was named Laga FC, the club is well known as a nomadic club in the face of 2016 Indonesia Soccer Championship B. The club had suffered some embarrassing things related homebase, including failing to hold the inaugural match of counter Persik Kediri May 1, 2016, in Stadium Merdeka, Jombang. There are at least three (3) the city which is the home base in one season by Laga FC, namely Surabaya, Jombang, and Kota Batu. The last time Laga FC match live at the stadium Brantas, Kota Batu.

=== Sragen FC ===
Shares of Laga FC purchased by the Sragen employer, Indika Wijaya Kusuma with IDR 5 billion from PT Nusantara Mandiri Laga. With the club he bought stock, then the future of the club is no longer nomads such as competition 2016 Indonesia Soccer Championship B, which should move the city. With the turn of the united Sragen name into the club will make Sragen as their homebase in Liga 2 this season.

== Stadium ==
Taruna Stadium chosen as their homebase to face any opponent there.

== Players ==
=== Current squad ===
As of 11 November 2023

Note: Flags indicate national team as defined under FIFA eligibility rules; some limited exceptions apply. Players may hold more than one non-FIFA nationality.

No.	Pos.	Nation	Player
1	GK	IDN	Eron Kharisma Putra
3	MF	IDN	Cucun Denny Dico
4	DF	IDN	Dimas Dewa Satria
6	FW	IDN	Joko Purnomo
8	MF	IDN	Ababi Sholikin
9	FW	IDN	Farrel Ahya
10	FW	IDN	Ahmad Rizal
11	FW	IDN	Abdul Malik Rabbani
13	MF	IDN	Rizka Fathurohman
14	MF	IDN	Farrel Arya (on loan from PSIS Semarang)
17	DF	IDN	Roydhatul Shidiq
19	MF	IDN	Radya Yoska
20	GK	IDN	Angga Saputra

No.	Pos.	Nation	Player
21	DF	IDN	Ahmad Saeful Hidayat
23	DF	IDN	AK Paksi Kencana
26	DF	IDN	Syukur Maulana
29	MF	IDN	Pingit Satria
30	MF	IDN	Dwi Noto
41	DF	IDN	Febryan Ahadita
45	FW	IDN	Anggit Tri Cahyono
47	GK	IDN	Yogik Fedona
50	FW	IDN	Fitriyanda Bagus
55	FW	IDN	Rohmat Deny
79	MF	IDN	Dwi Putra Mahardika
81	DF	IDN	Widi Kusumantoro
99	GK	IDN	Risky Fajar Permana

== Season-by-season records ==
As Laga FC

Season	League	Tier	Tms.	Pos.	Piala Indonesia
2014	Liga Nusantara	4	63	2	–
2015	Premier Division	2	55	did not finish	–
2016	ISC B	2	53	6th, Group 6	–

As Sragen United

Season	League	Tier	Tms.	Pos.	Piala Indonesia
2017	Liga 2	2	61	5th, Group 4	–
2018	Liga 3	3	32	Disqualified	–
2019					
2020
2021–22
2022–23
2023–24	Liga 3	3	80	Eliminated in Provincial round	–
2024–25					
2025–26

== Honours ==
- Liga Nusantara
  - Runners-up (1): 2014
