= Plosorejo =

Plosorejo may refer to several villages in Indonesia, in the province of Central Java:

- Plosorejo, Blora, a village in the Blora Regency
- Plosorejo, Grobogan, a village in the Grobogan Regency
- Plosorejo, Pati, a village in the Pati Regency
- Plosorejo, Sragen, a village in the Sragen Regency
