= Persip Pekalongan =

Association football team in Indonesia

- Full name: Persatuan Sepak Bola Indonesia Pekalongan
- Nickname: Laskar Kalong
- Founded: 1934; 92 years ago
- Ground: Hoegeng Stadium
- Capacity: 20,000
- Owner: Askot PSSI Pekalongan
- Chairman: M. Ridzky Arweidya
- Coach: Gatot Barnowo
- League: Liga 4
- 2024–25: Semi-finals (Central Java zone); Second round, 3rd in Group Q (National phase)
Home colours	Away colours

Persatuan Sepak Bola Indonesia Pekalongan, commonly known as Persip Pekalongan, or Persip, is an Indonesian football club based in Pekalongan, Central Java. They currently compete in Liga 4.

== History ==
Football as a people's sport has a long history in Pekalongan. This history can be traced back to the colonial era around 1920. Even before the founding of the PSSI, football had already become a popular activity that many people watched. At that time, a European club from Austria had time to compete with a local team in the town square. Pekalongan and one of the oldest clubs in Pekalongan ever recorded is THH, a club owned by Chinese residents.

recorded in the book Voetbal 40 Jarr in the Netherlands indie, 1894-1934 by W. Berrety. THH is one of the clubs from Pekalongan that participates in a competition held by NIVU (Nederlandsche Indishe Voetbal Unie) or a football association organized by Dutch East Indies. It is not surprising that this historical site is now starting to be pioneered again by Laskar Kalong who are able to penetrate the Indonesian Premier Division level.

The local teams in Pekalongan, both those that have existed since the colonial era or those that emerged after the independence era, have a myriad of talented talents. One of Pekalongan's talents who was able to penetrate the list of players Indonesia national team was Muhammad Ridho. In addition, several national players have played for Persip Pekalongan, including: Patricio Jiménez Díaz, Zulvin Zamrun, Elie Aiboy, Awan Setho Raharjo, Irkham Mila, Wahyu Wiji Astanto, Ibrahim Sanjaya, and Arif Yanggi Rahman.

== Players ==
=== Current squad ===
As of 8 November 2023

Note: Flags indicate national team as defined under FIFA eligibility rules; some limited exceptions apply. Players may hold more than one non-FIFA nationality.

No.	Pos.	Nation	Player
2	DF	IDN	Saviola Meindeita
3	DF	IDN	Adiya Dwi
4	DF	IDN	Sheva Istnan
5	DF	IDN	Fajar W
6	FW	IDN	Mahardika Respati
8	MF	IDN	Andre Aditya
9	FW	IDN	Okka Majid
10	FW	IDN	Ahmad Rizal
11	FW	IDN	Ali Al Azmi
13	MF	IDN	Khakam Nizam
14	MF	IDN	Lukman Sholeh
17	DF	IDN	Andika Setyo W
19	MF	IDN	Haezel Wahyudya
20	GK	IDN	Surya Rizky
21	DF	IDN	Wawan Ridho
23	DF	IDN	Saviola

No.	Pos.	Nation	Player
26	DF	IDN	Aqsha Saniskara (on loan from PSIS Semarang)
29	MF	IDN	Zico Uldha
30	MF	IDN	Haidar Nur Afif
41	DF	IDN	Pradipa Abhirama
45	FW	IDN	Dimas Sevilla
47	MF	IDN	Tri Wibowo
50	FW	IDN	M Ibnu Iqbal
79	MF	IDN	Sakhrul Ramadhani
81	FW	IDN	Rishandy
99	MF	IDN	Hosemando Andri

== Stadium ==
Their homeground is Hoegeng Stadium, which is situated in Keraton Sports Complex in the downtown of Pekalongan, Central Java.

== Season-by-season records ==
Season	League	Tier	Tms.	Pos.	Piala Indonesia
2009–10	Second Division	4		Play-off winner	–
2010	First Division	3	57	3rd, Third round	–
2011–12	Premier Division	2	22	6th, Group 1	–
2013	Premier Division	2	39	6th, Group 2	–
2014	Premier Division	2	63	5th, Group 4	–
2015	Premier Division	2	55	did not finish	–
2016	ISC B	2	53	3rd, Group 3	–
2017	Liga 2	2	61	6th, Group 3	–
2018	Liga 3	3	32	Eliminated in National zone route	First round
2019	Liga 3	3	32	Eliminated in Provincial round	First round
2020	Liga 3	3	season abandoned		–
2021–22	Liga 3	3	64	Eliminated in Provincial round	–
2022–23	Liga 3	3	season abandoned		–
2023–24	Liga 3	3	80	3rd, Second round	–
2024–25	Liga 4	4	64	3rd, Second round	–
2025–26					

== Honours ==
- Liga 3 Central Java
  - Champions (2): 2022, 2023
