= Ali Barkah =

Indonesian footballer (born 1988)

Personal information
- Date of birth: 30 July 1988 (age 38)
- Place of birth: Banyumas Regency, Indonesia
- Height: 1.80 m (5 ft 11 in)
- Position: Goalkeeper

Youth career
- 2001–2007: Urakan FC
- 2008–2009: Pelita Jaya U-21

Senior career*
Years	Team	Apps	(Gls)
2009–2011	Pelita Jaya	6	(0)
2011–2012	Persela Lamongan	1	(0)
2013–2014	PSS Sleman	25	(0)
2015	Persibas Banyumas	0	(0)
2016	Mitra Kukar	0	(0)
2016	Persita Tangerang	3	(0)
2017–2018	Cilegon United	17	(0)
2019–2021	PSGC Ciamis	5	(0)
- * Club domestic league appearances and goals

Ali Barkah (born 30 July 1988) is an Indonesian former professional footballer who played as a goalkeeper.

== Club statistics ==
Club	Season	Super League		Premier Division		Piala Indonesia		Total	
Club	Season	Apps	Goals	Apps	Goals	Apps	Goals	Apps	Goals
Pelita Jaya FC	2009-10	5	0	-		-		5	0
Pelita Jaya FC	2010-11	1	0	-		-		1	0
Persela Lamongan	2011-12	1	0	-		-		1	0
PSS Sleman	2013	-		11	0	-		11	0
PSS Sleman	2014	-		0	0	-		0	0
Total		7	0	11	0	-		18	0

== Honours ==
Pelita Jaya U-21

- Indonesia Super League U-21: 2008-09

PSS Sleman

- Divisi Utama LPIS: 2013
