= Persegal Tegal =

Indonesian football club

- Full name: Persatuan Sepakbola Tegal
- Nicknames: Laskar Bahari (Marine Warriors); Pari Laut Jawa (Java Sea Stingray)
- Founded: 1970; 56 years ago
- Ground: Yos Sudarso Stadium; Tegal, Central Java
- Capacity: 12,000
- Owner: Tegal Government
- Chairman: M. Jumadi
- Manager: Abdul Kadir
- Coach: Suroso
- League: Liga 4
- 2023: 3rd in Group B, (Central Java zone)
Home colours	Away colours

Persatuan Sepakbola Tegal (simply known as Persegal) is an Indonesian football club based in Tegal, Central Java. They currently compete in the Liga 4 and their homeground is Yos Sudarso Stadium.

== Season-by-season records ==
Season(s)	League/Division	Tms.	Pos.	Piala Indonesia
2017				
2018
2019	Liga 3	32	Eliminated in Provincial round	–
2020				
2021–22
2022–23
2023–24	Liga 3	80	Eliminated in Provincial round	–
2024–25				
2025–26

== Players ==
=== Current squad ===
As of 8 November 2023

Note: Flags indicate national team as defined under FIFA eligibility rules; some limited exceptions apply. Players may hold more than one non-FIFA nationality.

No.	Pos.	Nation	Player
2	DF	IDN	Rizal MB
3	DF	IDN	Baseri
4	DF	IDN	Diaz
5	DF	IDN	Fajar W
6	FW	IDN	Mahardika Respati
8	MF	IDN	Andre
9	FW	IDN	Okka Majid
10	FW	IDN	Ahmad Rizal
11	FW	IDN	Ali Al Azmi
13	MF	IDN	Ananda Zola
14	MF	IDN	Lukman Sholeh
17	DF	IDN	Andika Setyo W
19	MF	IDN	Bayu Candra
20	GK	IDN	Muhammad Ulummudin
21	DF	IDN	Wawan Ridho
23	MF	IDN	Iqbal

No.	Pos.	Nation	Player
26	DF	IDN	Aqsha Saniskara (on loan from PSIS Semarang)
29	MF	IDN	Wahyu Widi
30	DF	IDN	Abdillah Shafa andika
41	DF	IDN	Pradipa Abhirama
45	FW	IDN	Dimas Sevilla
47	GK	IDN	Reza Bayu Angga
50	FW	IDN	M Ibnu Iqbal
79	MF	IDN	Adithya Jorry Guruh (on loan from PSIS Semarang)
81	GK	IDN	Saiful Amar
99	DF	IDN	David Febi Nugro
