= PSIK Klaten =

Indonesian football club

- Full name: Persatuan Sepakbola Indonesia Klaten
- Nicknames: Harimau Merapi (Merapi Tigers)
- Short name: PSIK
- Founded: 1946; 80 years ago
- Ground: Trikoyo Stadium; Klaten, Central Java
- Capacity: 3,000
- Owner: Klaten Government
- Chairman: Jajang Prihono
- Manager: Sri Purwanto
- Coach: Nanang Kurniawan
- League: Liga 4
- 2023–24: Quarter-finals, (Central Java zone); 3rd in Group O, (National)
Home colours	Away colours

Persatuan Sepakbola Indonesia Klaten (simply known as PSIK Klaten) is an Indonesian football club based in Klaten Regency, Central Java. They currently compete in the Liga 4.

== Players ==
=== Current squad ===
As of 26 September 2022

Note: Flags indicate national team as defined under FIFA eligibility rules; some limited exceptions apply. Players may hold more than one non-FIFA nationality.

No.	Pos.	Nation	Player
1	GK	IDN	Osvaldo Zidan
3	DF	IDN	Didik Purwanto
4	DF	IDN	Vixto Dwi
5	DF	IDN	Bima Wahyu
6	MF	IDN	Didik Endra
7	DF	IDN	Danang Saputro
8	MF	IDN	Yogi Tri
9	FW	IDN	Arya Seta
10	MF	IDN	Yoga Putra
11	FW	IDN	Abdul Aziz
12	MF	IDN	Yakub Prasetyo
14	FW	IDN	Rahmat Ali
15	MF	IDN	Fillah Akbar
17	DF	IDN	Arwin Adiasa

No.	Pos.	Nation	Player
18	FW	IDN	Jody Kurniadi
19	DF	IDN	Hamam Kurniawan
20	GK	IDN	Dimas Rahmat
21	FW	IDN	Andrid Wibawa
22	MF	IDN	Kusuma Yuda
23	FW	IDN	Aria Ilham
24	MF	IDN	Deny Kristiawan
28	MF	IDN	Hisyam Nasrul
29	DF	IDN	Giwi Dika
30	GK	IDN	Joko Santoso
31	DF	IDN	Dimas Arga

== Season-by-season records ==
Season(s)	League/Division	Tms.	Pos.	Piala Indonesia
2017				
2018	Liga 3	32	Eliminated in Provincial round	–
2019				
2020	Liga 3	season abandoned		–
2021–22				
2022–23	Liga 3	season abandoned		–
2023–24	Liga 3	80	3rd, First round	–
2024–25				
2025–26	Liga 4	64	Eliminated in Provincial round	–

== Honours ==
- Liga 3 Central Java
  - Runners-up: 2022
