= Persiwi Wonogiri =

Indonesian football club On Wonogiri

Persiwi
- Full name: Persatuan Sepakbola Indonesia Wonogiri
- Nickname: Laskar Gajah Mungkur
- Founded: 1964; 62 years ago
- Ground: Pringgodani Stadium; Wonogiri, Central Java
- Capacity: 8,000
- Owner: PSSI Wonogiri Regency
- Chairman: Roni Ardhiles Manafe
- Manager: Budi Narwanto
- Coach: Lilik Agung Santosa
- League: Liga 4
Home colours	Away colours

Persatuan Sepakbola Indonesia Wonogiri (simply known as Persiwi) is an Indonesian football club based in Wonogiri Regency, Central Java. They currently compete in the Liga 4.

== Season-by-season records ==
Season(s)	League/Division	Tms.	Pos.	Piala Indonesia
2015	Liga Nusantara	season abandoned		–
2016				
2017
2018
2019
2020
2021–22
2022–23	Liga 3	season abandoned		–
2023–24				
2024–25
2025–26
