= UNSA F.C. =

Association football team in Indonesia

UNSA
- Full name: Universitas Surakarta Football Club
- Nickname: The Students
- Short name: UNSA
- Founded: 1998; 28 years ago
- Ground: Universitas Negeri Surakarta Stadium; Surakarta
- Capacity: 2,000
- Owner: Surakarta University
- Manager: De Stevano Arsela
- Coach: Ahmad Arif
- League: Liga 4
- 2023–24: Quarter–finals, (Central Java zone); Round of 32, (National)
Home colours	Away colours

Universitas Surakarta Football Club, often abbreviated to UNSA, is an Indonesian football club based in Surakarta, Central Java. They currently compete in the Liga 4 Central Java Zone.

== Season-by-season records ==
Season(s)	League/Division	Tms.	Pos.	Piala Indonesia
2017				
2018
2019
2020
2021–22
2022–23	Liga 3	season abandoned		–
2023–24	Liga 3	80	3rd, Second round	–
2024–25				
2025–26
