= PSDB United =

Indonesian football club

- Full name: Persatuan Sepakbola Demak Bersatu United
- Nicknames: Macan Demak (Demak Tigers)
- Short name: PSDB; PSDB-U
- Founded: 2021; 5 years ago
- Ground: Pancasila Stadium; Demak, Central Java
- Capacity: 2,000
- Owner: PT Persatuan Sepak Bola Demak Bersatu
- Chairman: Dandy Iqbal Saputra
- Coach: Taufik Salaffudin
- League: Liga 4
- 2023–24: Semifinals, (Central Java zone); Round of 32, (National)
- Website: http://psdbunited.com/
Home colours	Away colours

Persatuan Sepakbola Demak Bersatu United (simply known as PSDB United) is an Indonesian football club based in Demak Regency, Central Java. They currently compete in the Liga 4.

== Season-by-season records ==
Season(s)	League/Division	Tms.	Pos.	Piala Indonesia
2021–22	Liga 3	64	Eliminated in Provincial round	–
2022–23	Liga 3	season abandoned		–
2023–24	Liga 3	80	3rd, Second round	–
2024–25				
2025–26
