= Aqsha Saniskara =

Indonesian footballer

Personal information
- Full name: Aqsha Saniskara Prawira
- Date of birth: 26 September 2000 (age 26)
- Place of birth: Semarang, Indonesia
- Height: 1.73 m (5 ft 8 in)
- Position: Right-back

Youth career
- –2018: Persikas Semarang Regency
- 2019–2020: PSIS Semarang

Senior career*
Years	Team	Apps	(Gls)
2019–2024	PSIS Semarang	18	(1)
2023	→ Persik Kendal (loan)	8	(0)
2024	Persikabo 1973	9	(0)
2024–2025	Persikota Tangerang	7	(0)
2025–2026	PSIS Semarang	11	(0)
- * Club domestic league appearances and goals as of 23 November 2025

Aqsha Saniskara Prawira (born 26 September 2000) is an Indonesian professional footballer who plays as a right-back.

== Career ==
=== PSIS Semarang ===
He was signed for PSIS Semarang to play in Liga 1 in the 2018 season. Saniskara made his professional debut on 31 August 2019 in a match against Arema at the Kanjuruhan Stadium, Malang Regency.

== Career statistics ==
As of 23 November 2025

Club	Season	League			Cup		Continental		Other		Total	
Club	Season	Division	Apps	Goals	Apps	Goals	Apps	Goals	Apps	Goals	Apps	Goals
PSIS Semarang	2019	Liga 1	1	0	0	0	–		0	0	1	0
PSIS Semarang	2020	Liga 1	0	0	0	0	–		0	0	0	0
PSIS Semarang	2021–22	Liga 1	13	1	0	0	–		0	0	13	1
PSIS Semarang	2022–23	Liga 1	4	0	0	0	–		1 (Note: Appearances in Indonesia President's Cup.)	0	5	0
Persik Kendal (loan)	2023–24	Liga 3	8	0	0	0	–		0	0	8	0
Persikabo 1973	2024–25	Liga 2	9	0	0	0	–		0	0	9	0
Persikota Tangerang	2024–25	Liga 2	7	0	0	0	–		0	0	7	0
PSIS Semarang	2025–26	Championship	11	0	0	0	–		0	0	11	0
Career total			53	1	0	0	0	0	1	0	54	1
