= Andri =

Andri is a primarily male given name etymologically related to the English language given name Andrew.

People with the name include:

== Sports figures ==
- Andri Abubakar (born 1988), Indonesian footballer
- Andri Aganits (born 1993), Estonian volleyball player
- Andri Avraam (born 1982), Cypriot long-distance runner
- Andri Baldursson (born 2002), Icelandic footballer
- Andri Berenger (born 1991), Sri Lankan cricketer
- Andri Rúnar Bjarnason (born 1990), Icelandic footballer
- Andri Eleftheriou (born 1984), Cypriot female sport shooter
- Andri Frischknecht (born 1994), Swiss cross-country mountain biker
- Andri Guðjohnsen (born 2002), Icelandic footballer
- Andri Ibo (born 1990), Indonesian footballer
- Andri Kustiawan (born 1991), Indonesian futsal player
- Andri Marteinsson (born 1965), Icelandic footballer
- Andri Muliadi (born 1993), Indonesian footballer
- Andri Ragettli (born 1998), Swiss skier
- Andri Sigþórsson (born 1977), Icelandic international footballer
- Andri Stafa (born 2002), Albanian footballer
- Andri Struzina (born 1997), Swiss rower
- Andri Syahputra (born 1999), Qatari footballer

== Others ==
- Andri Steinþór Björnsson (born 1973), Icelandic psychologist and academic
- Andri Cung (born 1982), Chinese Indonesian film director and producer
- Andri Kirsima (born 1971), Estonian architect
- Andri Snær Magnason (born 1973), Icelandic writer
- Andri Silberschmidt (born 1994), Swiss businessman and politician
- Andri Steinn (born 1979), Icelandic film editor
- Andri Xhahu (born 1987), Albanian television and radio presenter

== See also ==
- Ferdinand Andri (1871–1956), Austrian architect
- André, a given name
- Andris, a given name
