= Persibas Banyumas =

Indonesian football club

- Full name: Persatuan Sepakbola Indonesia Banyumas
- Nicknames: Laskar Bawor (Bawor Warriors); Serigala Slamet (Mount Slamet Wolves)
- Short name: BYU
- Founded: 11 August 1986; 39 years ago
- Ground: Satria Stadium; Purwokerto, Banyumas Regency, Central Java
- Capacity: 20,000
- Owner: PT. Permata Satria Banyumas
- Chairman: Sadewo Tri Lastiono
- Manager: Yondi Oskaria
- Coach: Sartono Anwar
- League: Liga 4
- 2023: 4th in Group E, (Central Java zone) Disqualified
- Website: https://persibasbanyumas.com/
| Home colours | Away colours |

Persatuan Sepakbola Indonesia Banyumas, commonly known as Persibas Banyumas, or Persibas, is an Indonesian football team based in Purwokerto, Banyumas Regency, Central Java. They currently play in Liga 4.

== History ==
- In 1950, ISB or Ikatan Sepakbola Banyumas was founded.
- In 1986, ISB changed by the Banyumas Government to be Persibas Banyumas.
- In 2014, they plays in 2014 Liga Nusantara and Promoted to 2015 Liga Indonesia Premier Division.
- In 2015–2016, All Indonesian League was canceled due to suspended by Ministry of Youth and Sports.
- In 2017, they plays in 2017 Liga 2 Indonesia.
- In 2018, they plays in 2018 Liga 3 Indonesia.
- In 2019, they plays in 2019 Liga 3 Central Java Zone.
- In 2023, they plays in 2023 Liga 3 Zona Central Java. However, he was disqualified by Asprov PSSI Central Java due to riots by Persibas supporters.

== Players ==
=== Current squad ===
As of 13 November 2023

Note: Flags indicate national team as defined under FIFA eligibility rules; some limited exceptions apply. Players may hold more than one non-FIFA nationality.

| No. | Pos. | Nation | Player |
|---|---|---|---|
| 1 | GK | IDN | Abdul Mujib |
| 2 | DF | IDN | Syahrul Ramadhani |
| 3 | DF | IDN | Imam Ariyanto |
| 4 | DF | IDN | Helmi alfayet |
| 5 | DF | IDN | Firmaysah Aziz |
| 6 | MF | IDN | Nurani Hermawan |
| 7 | MF | IDN | Bagus Elang Permana |
| 8 | MF | IDN | Buana Agatha |
| 9 | FW | IDN | Anwar Priasantosa |
| 10 | FW | IDN | Muhammad Zaki |
| 12 | DF | IDN | Nurcholik Iman |
| 13 | MF | IDN | Setiawan Figo |

| No. | Pos. | Nation | Player |
|---|---|---|---|
| 14 | MF | IDN | Aprlianto Bagas |
| 15 | DF | IDN | Febriana Chandra |
| 16 | FW | IDN | Khoerun Feri |
| 17 | MF | IDN | Muhammad Ziaulhaq |
| 18 | MF | IDN | Welastya Saeldho |
| 19 | DF | IDN | Zein Helmi |
| 20 | DF | IDN | Gus Dwi Cahyo |
| 21 | DF | IDN | Hudia Nasrul |
| 25 | GK | IDN | Syarif Juan |
| 26 | FW | IDN | Dimas Saputra |
| 27 | MF | IDN | Raja Langit |
| 29 | DF | IDN | Fajar Rendi |
| 30 | GK | IDN | Wildan Nasir |

== Season-by-season records ==
| Season(s) | League/Division | Tms. | Pos. | Piala Indonesia |
|---|---|---|---|---|
| 2010–11 | Second Division | 78 | 3rd, Third round | – |
| 2011–12 | First Division | 66 | 3rd, First stage | – |
| 2013 | First Division | 77 | 3rd, Second round | – |
| 2014 | First Division | 73 | 3rd, Fourth round | – |
| 2014 | Liga Nusantara | 16 | 3rd, Second round | – |
| 2015 | Premier Division | season abandoned | | – |
| 2016 | ISC B | 53 | 6th, Group 3 | – |
| 2017 | Liga 2 | 61 | 5th, Group 3 | – |
| 2018 | Liga 3 | 32 | 3rd, First round | – |
| 2019 | Liga 3 | 32 | 3rd, First round | – |
| 2020 | Liga 3 | season abandoned | | – |
| 2021–22 | Liga 3 | 64 | Eliminated in Provincial round | – |
| 2022–23 | Liga 3 | season abandoned | | – |
| 2023–24 | Liga 3 | 80 | Disqualified in Provincial round | – |
| 2024–25 | | | | |
| 2025–26 | Liga 4 | 64 | Eliminated in Provincial round | – |

== Stadium ==
Persibas plays their home matches in Satria Stadium in Purwokerto which seats 20,000 spectators.

== Supporters ==
Group supporters who are currently actively supporting Persibas Banyumas including Laskar Bombastik, Laskar Satria, Ultras Knight Rebel, and there are several other groups of supporters.

== Rivalries ==
The main and fierce rival of Persibas is Persibangga Purbalingga. Persibas also built up rivalries with PSCS Cilacap. The derby between the three is called the Derby Ngapak .

== Notable former players ==
- (Netherlands) Zee van Gaps (1980s-1990s)
- (Australia) McGedy Buton (1980s-1990s)
- (Indonesia) Waluyo (2003–2007)
- (Indonesia) Ali Barkah (2015)
- (Indonesia) Andesi Setyo Prabowo (2017)
