= Goentoer Darjono Stadium =

Football stadium in Purbalingga, Indonesia

Coordinates: 7°23′38″S 109°21′38″E

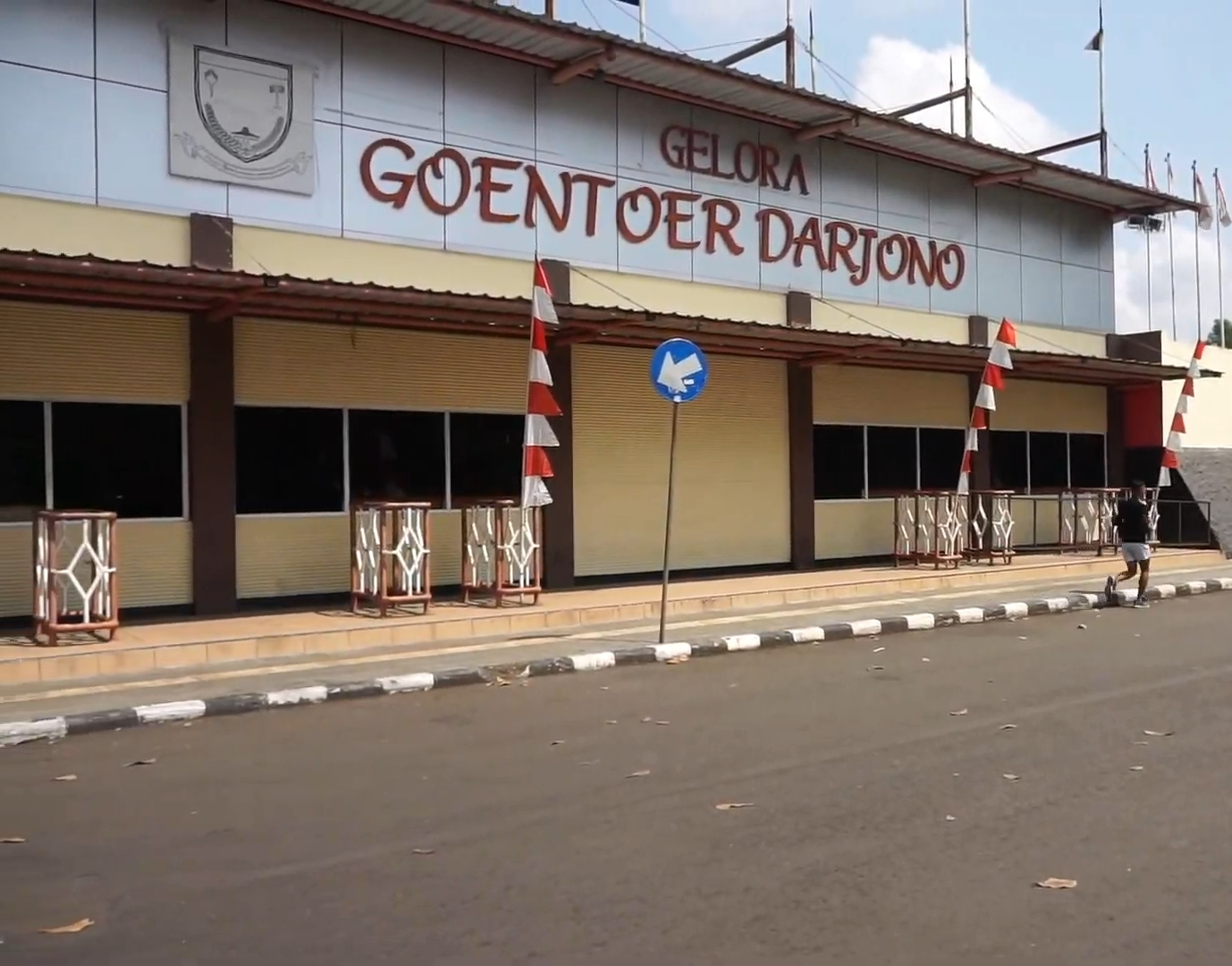
- Exterior of the stadium in August 2020
- Interactive map of Goentoer Darjono Stadium
- Full name: Gelora Goentoer Darjono
- Former names: Wasesa Stadium
- Location: Purbalingga Regency, Central Java, Indonesia
- Owner: Government of Purbalingga Regency
- Operator: Government of Purbalingga Regency
- Capacity: 15,000
- Surface: Grass field

Construction
- Built: 2008
- Opened: 25 November 2009

Tenant
- Persibangga Purbalingga

Gelora Goentoer Darjono Stadium or commonly known as Goentoer Darjono Stadium is a football stadium in the town of Purbalingga, Indonesia. The stadium has a capacity of 15,000 people.

It is the home base of Persibangga Purbalingga .
