= Andesi Setyo Prabowo =

Indonesian footballer

Andesi Prabowo
Personal information
- Full name: Andesi Setyo Prabowo
- Date of birth: 1 October 1989 (age 37)
- Place of birth: Banyumas, Indonesia
- Height: 1.76 m (5 ft 9 in)
- Position: Midfielder

Youth career
- 2001–2007: Indonesia Muda Purwokerto
- 2008–2010: Pelita Jaya

Senior career*
Years	Team	Apps	(Gls)
2009–2012	Pelita Jaya	19	(1)
2012–2013	Persibas Banyumas	23	(6)
2014–2016	PSCS Cilacap	36	(3)
2017	Persibas Banyumas	9	(0)
2018–2020	PSGC Ciamis	9	(0)
2021–2022	Persikasi Bekasi	17	(1)
2024	Persigar Garut	3	(0)
- * Club domestic league appearances and goals as of 1 May 2024

Andesi Setyo Prabowo (born 1 October 1989) is an Indonesian professional footballer who plays as a midfielder.

== Club statistics ==
Club	Season	Super League		Premier Division		Piala Indonesia		Total								
Club	Season	Apps	Goals	Apps	Goals	Apps	Goals	Apps	Goals							
Pelita Jaya FC	2009-10	1	0	-		1	0	2	0							
Pelita Jaya FC	2010-11	15	1	-		-		15	1							
Pelita Jaya FC	2011-12	3	0	-		-		3	0							
Total		19	1	-		1	0	20	1							
Persibas Banyumas	2013	1	0	-		1	0	2	0							
Persibas Banyumas	2014	15	1	-		-		15	1							
Persibas Banyumas	2015	3	0	-		-		3	0							
Total		19	1	-		1	0	20	1	2016	3	0	-	-	3	0
Total		19	1	-		1	0	20	1	2017	3	0	-	-	3	0
Total		19	1	-		1	0	20	1							

== Hounors ==
=== Clubs ===
Pelita Jaya U-21

- Indonesia Super League U-21: 2008-09
- Indonesia Super League U-21 runner-up: 2009-10

PSCS Cilacap

- Indonesia Soccer Championship B: 2016
