= Persibara Banjarnegara =

Indonesian football club

- Full name: Persatuan Sepakbola Indonesia Banjarnegara
- Nicknames: Laskar Dipayuda (Dipayuda Warriors); Pelatuk Jawa (The Javan Woodpecker)
- Founded: 1989; 37 years ago
- Ground: Sumitro Kolopaking Stadium; Banjarnegara, Central Java
- Capacity: 10,000
- Owner: Askab PSSI Banjarnegara
- Manager: Firman Sapta Ady
- Coach: Tri Agus Prasetijo
- League: Liga 4
- 2023: 3rd in Group E, (Central Java zone)
Home colours	Away colours

Persatuan Sepakbola Indonesia Banjarnegara (simply known as Persibara) is an Indonesian football club based in Banjarnegara Regency, Central Java. They compete in the Liga 4, but they currently compete in the Soeratin Cup for the youth team because in their senior team sector, they have been out for almost 3 seasons (2021, 2020, and 2019) in the Liga 3.

== Season-by-season records ==
Season(s)	League/Division	Tms.	Pos.	Piala Indonesia
2014	Liga Nusantara	16	Eliminated in Provincial round	–
2015	Liga Nusantara	season abandoned		–
2016				
2017
2018	Liga 3	32	Eliminated in Regional round	–
2019				
2020	Liga 3	season abandoned		–
2021–22				
2022–23
2023–24	Liga 3	80	Eliminated in Provincial round	–
2024–25				
2025–26	Liga 4	64	Eliminated in Provincial round	–

== Honours ==
- Liga 3 Central Java
  - Runner-up: 2018
