= Persekap Pekalongan =

Indonesian football club

Persekap Kabupaten Pekalongan
- Full name: Persatuan Sepakbola Kabupaten Pekalongan
- Nicknames: Kutilang Emas; Laskar Ki Ageng Cempaluk
- Founded: 4 September 1949; 77 years ago
- Ground: Widya Manggala Krida Stadium, Pekalongan Regency, Central Java
- Capacity: 7,000
- Owner: Askab PSSI Pekalongan
- Chairman: Candra Saputra
- Manager: Slamet Nuridin
- Coach: M. Hasan
- League: Liga 4
- 2023: 4th in Group B, (Central Java zone)
Home colours	Away colours

Persatuan Sepakbola Kabupaten Pekalongan, commonly known as Persekap Kabupaten Pekalongan, is an Indonesian football club based in Pekalongan Regency, Central Java, Indonesia, and currently play in Liga 4.

== History ==
Persekap Pekalongan was born on September 4, 1949. Like other Indonesian clubs, Persekap has the nickname Laskar Ki Ageng Cempaluk. The name was taken from the name of a great figure, namely the father of Ki Bahurekso. Persekap is Their homeground at the Widya Manggala Krida Stadium, an arena that only has a grandstand on the west side.

== Season-by-season records ==
Season(s)	League/Division	Tms.	Pos.	Piala Indonesia
2010–11	Second Division	78	3rd, First round	–
2012	Second Division	100	3rd, First round	–
2013	First Division	77	4th, First round	–
2014	First Division	73	5th, First round	–
2014	Liga Nusantara	16	3rd, First round	–
2015	Liga Nusantara	season abandoned		–
2016	ISC Liga Nusantara	32	Eliminated in Provincial round	–
2017	Liga 3	32	Eliminated in Provincial round	–
2018	Liga 3	32	Eliminated in Provincial round	–
2019				
2020	Liga 3	season abandoned		–
2021–22	Liga 3	64	Eliminated in Provincial round	–
2022–23	Liga 3	season abandoned		–
2023–24	Liga 3	80	Eliminated in Provincial round	–
2024–25				
2025–26

== Honours ==
- Liga Nusantara Central Java
  - Champions: 2014
