= Wergu Wetan Stadium =

Stadium in Kudus, Indonesia

- Stadion Wergu Wetan
- Location in Java
- Location: Kudus, Indonesia
- Coordinates: 6.8160139°S 110.8508512°E
- Owner: Persiku Kudus
- Operator: Persiku Kudus
- Capacity: 15,000
- Surface: Grass

Tenant
- Persiku Kudus

Wergu Wetan Stadium is a multi-purpose stadium in Kudus, Indonesia. It is currently used mostly for football matches and is used as the home venue for Persiku Kudus of the Liga Indonesia. The stadium has a capacity of 15,000 spectators.
