= PSIP Pemalang =

Indonesian football club

- Full name: Persatuan Sepakbola Indonesia Pemalang
- Nicknames: Laskar Benowo (Benowo Warriors); Kacer Jawa (Javan Magpies)
- Short name: PEM, PSIP
- Founded: 1980; 46 years ago
- Ground: Mochtar Stadium; Pemalang, Central Java
- Capacity: 4,000
- Owner: Askab PSSI Pemalang
- Manager: Suharjono
- Coach: Albert
- League: Liga 4
- 2023: 3rd, Group H (Central Java zone)
Home colours	Away colours

Persatuan Sepakbola Indonesia Pemalang (simply known as PSIP Pemalang) is an Indonesian football club based in Pemalang, Central Java. They currently compete in the Liga 4. Their nickname is Laskar Benowo and Kacer Jawa.

== History ==
Founded in 1970. In 2018, PSIP won the 2018 Liga 3 Central Java after beating their rival, Persibara Banjarnegara. In 2018–19 Piala Indonesia, this club made it into the round of 64.

== Season-by-season records ==
Season(s)	League/Division	Tms.	Pos.	Piala Indonesia
2014	Liga Nusantara	16	Eliminated in Provincial round	–
2015				
2016	ISC Liga Nusantara	32	Eliminated in Provincial round	–
2017	Liga 3	32	Eliminated in Provincial round	–
2018	Liga 3	32	Eliminated in Regional round	–
2019	Liga 3	32	Eliminated in Regional round	–
2020	Liga 3	season abandoned		–
2021–22	Liga 3	64	Eliminated in Provincial round	–
2022–23	Liga 3	season abandoned		–
2023–24	Liga 3	80	Eliminated in Provincial round	–
2024–25				
2025–26	Liga 4	64	Eliminated in Provincial round	–

== Players ==
=== Current squad ===
Note: Flags indicate national team as defined under FIFA eligibility rules; some limited exceptions apply. Players may hold more than one non-FIFA nationality.

No.	Pos.	Nation	Player
—	GK	IDN	Dio Bagas Mandira Suryana
—	GK	IDN	Hadi Purwanto
—	GK	IDN	Nur Husnan
—	DF	IDN	Adi Riswanto
—	DF	IDN	Fikron Afriyanto
—	DF	IDN	Slamet Afrianto
—	DF	IDN	Yudha Andri Prastyo
—	DF	IDN	Arya De Salseo
—	DF	IDN	Tegar Hadi Prasetya
—	DF	IDN	Moh. Faiz Setyawan

No.	Pos.	Nation	Player
—	MF	IDN	Riyan Handika Fajar Mata
—	MF	IDN	Suryanto
—	MF	IDN	Zainal Abidin
—	MF	IDN	Husain Fajar R
—	MF	IDN	Rizki Wijayanto
—	FW	IDN	Arief Dwi Arnanto
—	FW	IDN	Oska Lestaluhu
—	FW	IDN	Ahmad Ibnu Yahya
—	FW	IDN	Asep Dandi Kurniawan
—	FW	IDN	Darmanto
—	FW	IDN	Adi Purwanto

== Supporters ==
PSIP has 2 base of supporters namely Lasbo Mania and Ultras LBS.

== Honours ==
- Liga 3 Central Java
  - Champions (1): 2018

== Kit suppliers ==
- Puma (2010–2011)
- Nike (2011–2012)
- RFK (2018)
- Artland Sportswear (2019)
