= Hoegeng Stadium =

Football stadium in Central Java, Indonesia

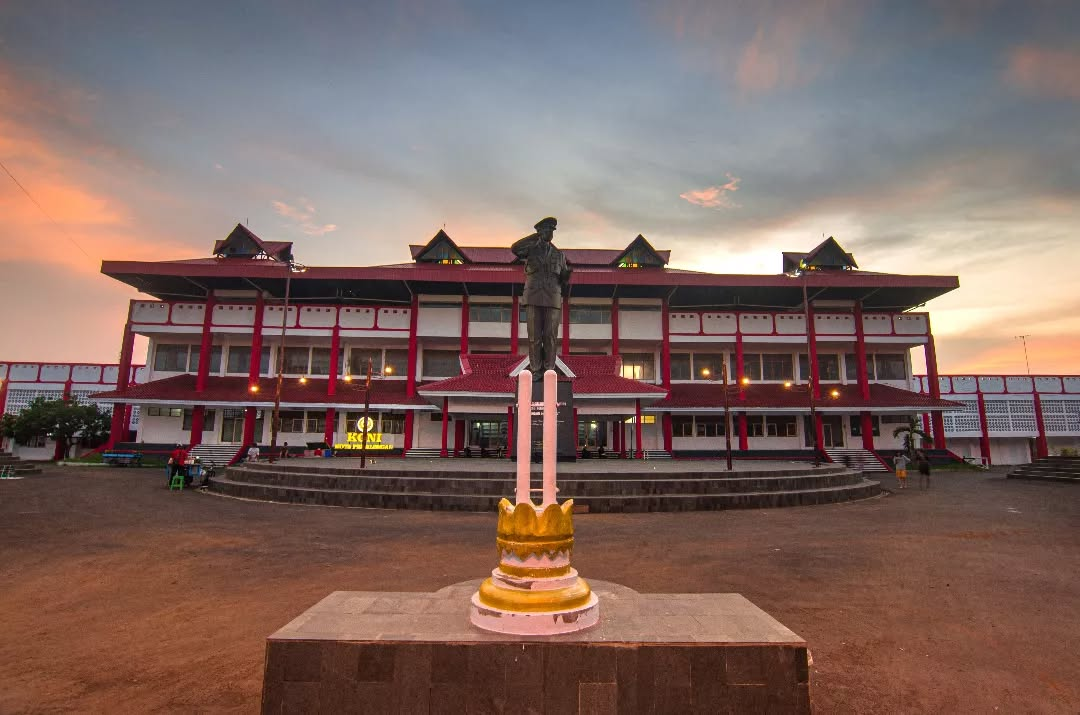
- Interactive map of Hoegeng Stadium
- Former names: Kraton Stadium; Batik City Stadium
- Location: Pekalongan, Central Java, Indonesia
- Coordinates: 6°53′0″S 109°39′57″E
- Owner: Government of Pekalongan City
- Operator: Government of Pekalongan City
- Capacity: 20,000
- Surface: Grass

Construction
- Built: 1986; 40 years ago
- Opened: 1986; 40 years ago
- Renovated: 2005

Tenant
- Persip Pekalongan

Hoegeng Stadium is a football stadium in Pekalongan, Central Java, Indonesia, and the home of Persip Pekalongan. The stadium was built in 1986 and designed with a capacity of 20,000 spectators. On 11 June 2014, for the first time, Hoegeng Stadium held a match on the evening between Persip against Persipur Purwodadi, which ended 3–0 victory for Persip Pekalongan. The stadium is named after Hoegeng, "the most honest and bravest police officer in Indonesia". It is mostly used for football matches.
