= Persik Kendal =

Indonesian football club

- Full name: Persatuan Sepakbola Indonesia Kendal
- Nicknames: Laskar Bahurekso; Elang Putih
- Founded: 1 January 1970; 56 years ago
- Ground: Kebondalem Stadium; Kendal, Central Java
- Capacity: 12,000
- Owner: PT. Persik Damar Kendal
- Chairman: Saipudin Fino Nino
- Manager: Agung Buwono
- Coach: Mahadi
- League: Liga 4
- 2024–25: 6th, in Group A (Central Java zone)
Home colours	Away colours

Persatuan Sepakbola Indonesia Kendal, commonly known as Persik Kendal is an Indonesian football club based in Kendal, Central Java. They currently compete in the Liga 4.

== History ==
Persik Kendal, has the nickname Bahurekso Warriors, adopted the name of the first regents of Kendal Tumenggung Bahurekso that help Sultan Agung stormed VOC to Batavia. Persik Kendal club playing in Division II Liga Indonesia in the 2006 season.

In the 2007 season Persik Kendal targeting promotion to First Division. Kebondalem Stadium redeveloped into a national-class stadium. At the Copa Dji Sam Soe Indonesia 2007 Persik made history by penetrating the main round of 64 with a face Persib Bandung. Despite failing to advance to round of 32 since losing 1-3 aggregate (0–3 in Bandung and 1–0 in Kendal), but Persik made history by defeating Persib in the second leg on June 7, 2007, 1-0 through goals Taryono in minutes to-70. In Second Division competition, Persik Kendal certainly advance to the round of 16, was ranked first with Group III-A.

== Stadium ==
Persik stadium named Kebondalem Stadium. Its location was in downtown Kendal, Central Java.

== Coaching staff ==
Position	Staff
Manager	(Indonesia) Agung Buwono
Assistant manager	(Indonesia) Eldo
Head coach	(Indonesia) Mahadi
Assistant coach	(Indonesia) Sudoko
Goalkeeper coach	(Indonesia) Rosyadi
Kitman	(Indonesia) Suyoko (Indonesia) Indra Supri
Media Officer	(Indonesia) Achmad Saefudin

== Players ==
=== Current squad ===
As of 8 November 2023

Note: Flags indicate national team as defined under FIFA eligibility rules; some limited exceptions apply. Players may hold more than one non-FIFA nationality.

No.	Pos.	Nation	Player
2	DF	IDN	Rizal MB
92	GK	IDN	Dimas Mahendra Tobing (on loan from Batoz FC)
66	MF	IDN	Lau Valent (on loan from Persepon Poncorejo)
79	FW	IDN	Tete Sugeo (on loan from Lanji FC)
37	MF	IDN	M Izzul Haq (on loan from FC Toho)
3	DF	IDN	Baseri
4	DF	IDN	Diaz
5	DF	IDN	Fajar W
6	FW	IDN	Mahardika Respati
8	MF	IDN	Andre
9	FW	IDN	Okka Majid
10	FW	IDN	Ahmad Rizal
11	FW	IDN	Ali Al Azmi
13	MF	IDN	Ananda Zola
14	MF	IDN	Lukman Sholeh
17	DF	IDN	Andika Setyo W
19	MF	IDN	Bayu Candra
20	GK	IDN	Muhammad Ulummudin

No.	Pos.	Nation	Player
21	DF	IDN	Wawan Ridho
23	MF	IDN	Iqbal
26	DF	IDN	Aqsha Saniskara (on loan from PSIS Semarang)
29	MF	IDN	Wahyu Widi
30	DF	IDN	Abdillah Shafa andika
41	DF	IDN	Pradipa Abhirama
45	FW	IDN	Dimas Sevilla
47	GK	IDN	Reza Bayu Angga
50	FW	IDN	M Ibnu Iqbal
79	MF	IDN	Adithya Jorry Guruh (on loan from PSIS Semarang)
81	GK	IDN	Saiful Amar
99	DF	IDN	David Febi Nugro
—	FW	IDN	Bahril Fahreza (on loan from PSIS Semarang)

== Season-by-season records ==
Season(s)	League/Division	Tms.	Pos.	Piala Indonesia
2010	First Division	57	3rd, Second stage	–
2011–12	First Division	66	Second stage	–
2013	First Division	77	6th, Second round	–
2014	First Division	73	4th, Second round	–
2015	Liga Nusantara	season abandoned		–
2016	ISC Liga Nusantara	32	Eliminated in Provincial round	–
2017	Liga 3	32	2	–
2018				
2019	Liga 3	32	Eliminated in Pre-national route	–
2020	Liga 3	season abandoned		–
2021–22	Liga 3	64	Eliminated in Provincial round	–
2022–23	Liga 3	season abandoned		–
2023–24	Liga 3	80	Eliminated in Provincial round	–
2024–25	Liga 4	64	Eliminated in Provincial round	–
2025–26	Liga 4	64	Eliminated in Provincial round	–

== Honours ==
- Liga 3
  - Runners-up: 2017
