= Sragen Regency =

Regency in Central Java, Indonesia

Sragen Regency Kabupaten Sragen
- Regency

Other transcription(s)
  - Javanese: ꦑꦧꦸꦥꦠꦺꦤ꧀ꦱꦿꦒꦺꦤ꧀
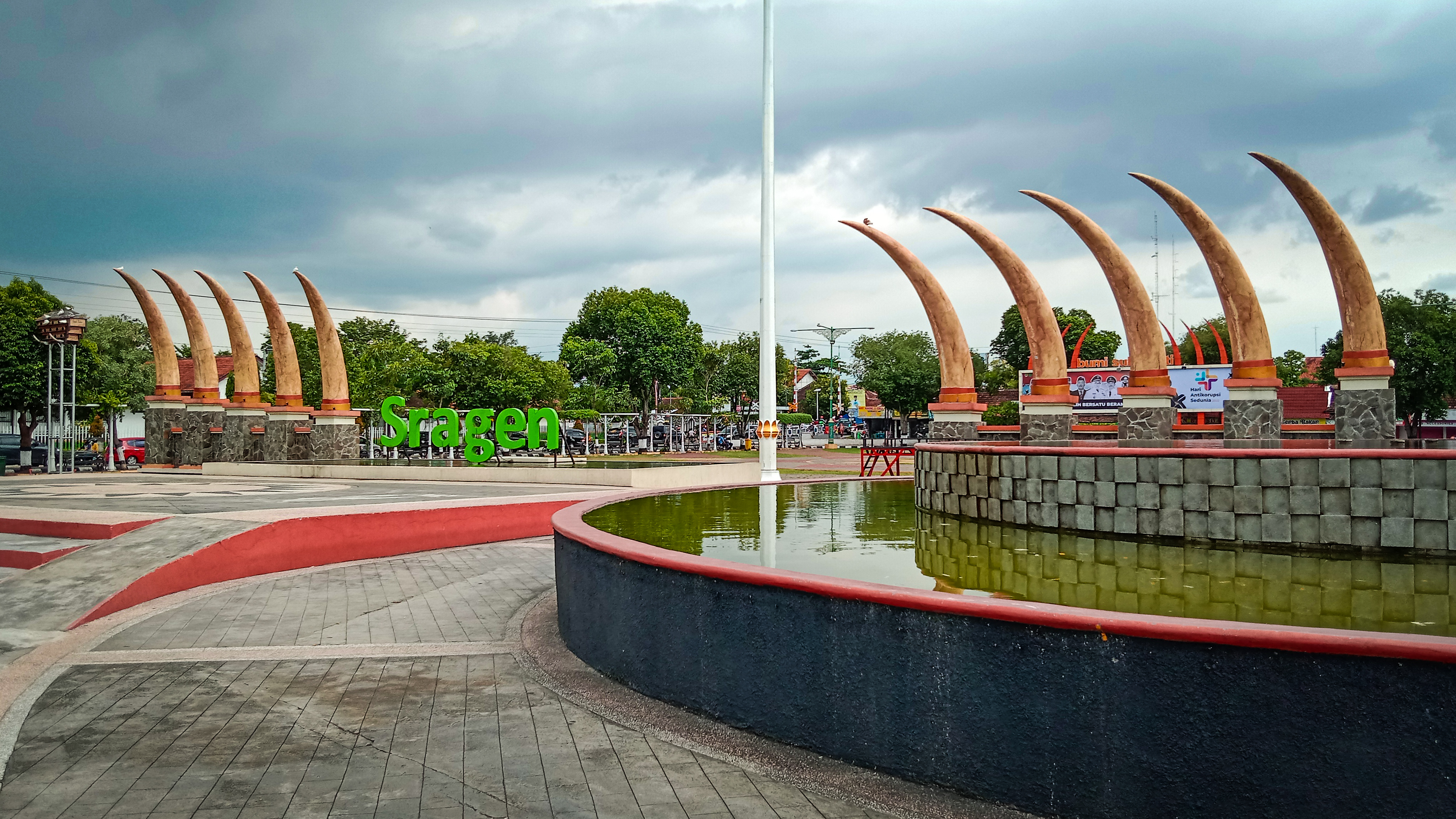
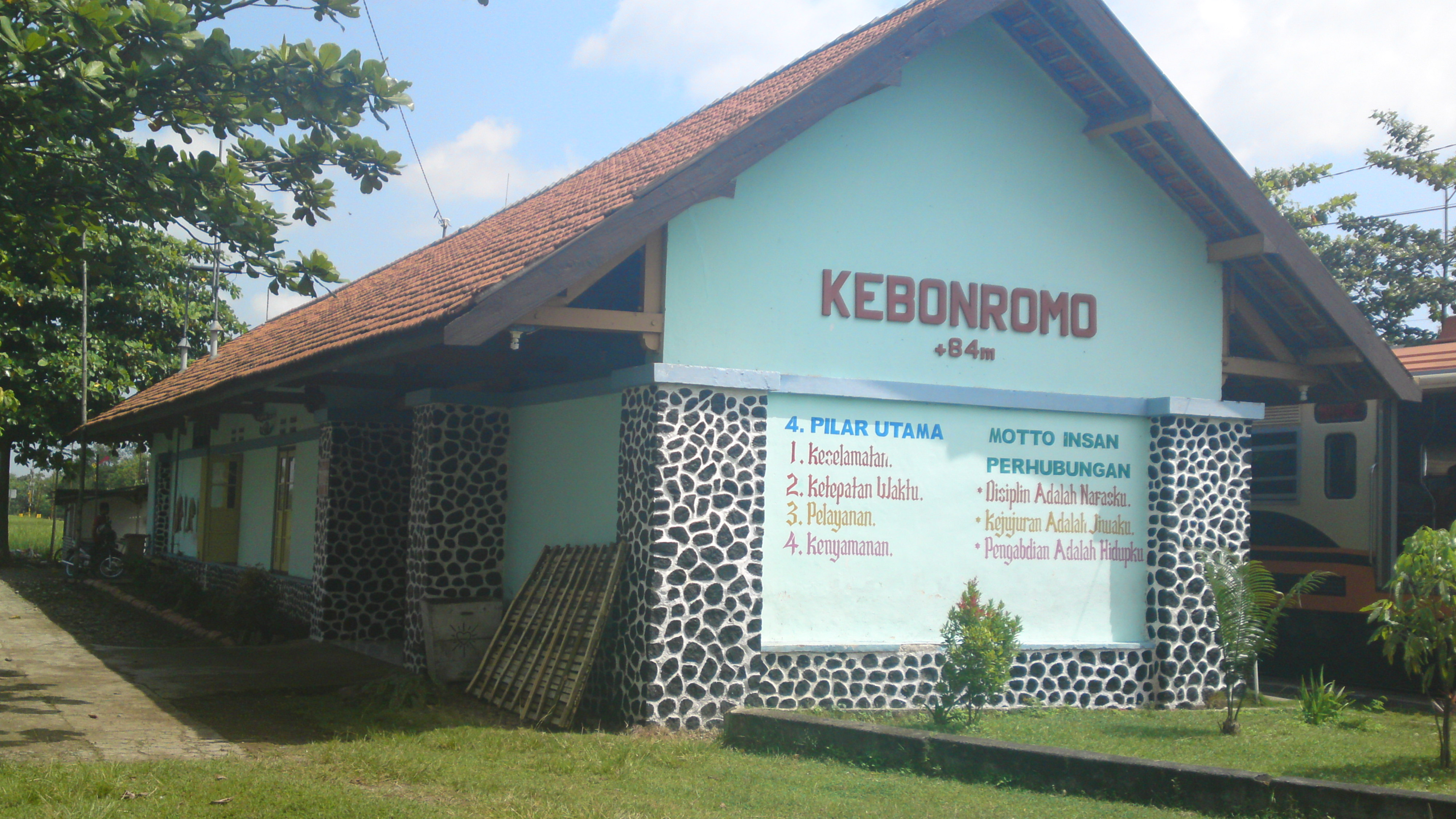
- From top to bottom: Sragen town square and Kebonromo Train Station

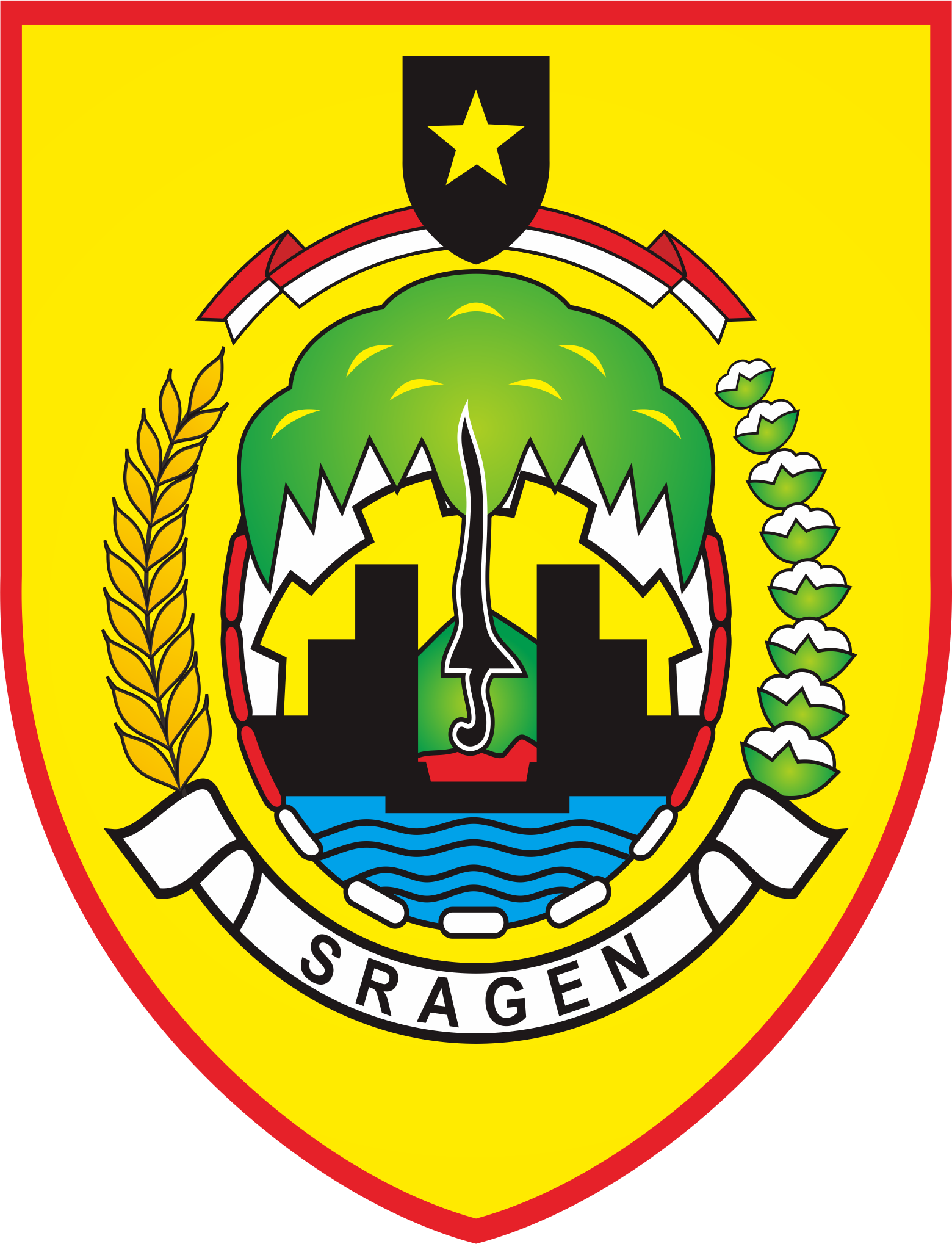
- Coat of arms

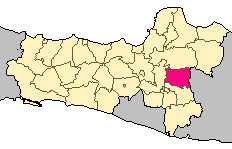
- Location within Central Java

- Location in Java and Indonesia Sragen Regency (Indonesia)
- Coordinates: 7.4128°S 110.9350°E
- Country: Indonesia
- Region: Java
- Province: Central Java
- Capital: Sragen

Government
  - Regent: Sigit Pamungkas
  - Vice Regent: Suroto

Area
  - Total: 994.57 km^{2} (384.01 sq mi)

Population (end 2025 estimate)
  - Total: 1,011,824
  - Density: 1,017.3/km^{2} (2,634.9/sq mi)
- Time zone: UTC+7 (IWST)
- Area code: (+62) 271
- Website: sragenkab.go.id

Sragen Regency (Javanese: ꦑꦧꦸꦥꦠꦺꦤ꧀ꦱꦿꦒꦺꦤ꧀, romanized: Kabupatèn Sragèn) is a regency (Indonesian: kabupaten) in the eastern part of Central Java province in Indonesia. It covers an area of 994.57 km^{2} and had a population of 858,266 at the 2010 Census and 976,951 at the 2020 Census; the official estimate as at mid 2025 was 1,011,824 (comprising 503,895 males and 507,929 females). Its capital is the town of Sragen, located about 30 km to the northeast of Surakarta. Sragen is bordered by Karanganyar Regency to the south, Boyolali Regency to the west, Grobogan Regency to the north, and East Java Province to the east.

Java's longest river, the Bengawan Solo River, flows through the fertile rice fields in the region. The archaeological excavation and UNESCO World Heritage Site of Sangiran is located in Sragen.

== Administrative districts ==
Sragen Regency comprises twenty districts (kecamatan), tabulated below with their areas and their populations at the 2010 Census and the 2020 Census, together with the official estimates as at mid 2025. The table also includes the locations of the district administrative centres, the number of administrative villages in each district (totaling 196 rural desa and 12 urban kelurahan), and its post code.

| Kode Wilayah | Name of District (kecamatan) | Area in km^{2} | Pop'n Census 2010 | Pop'n Census 2020 | Pop'n Estimate mid 2025 | Admin centre | No. of villages | Post code |
|---|---|---|---|---|---|---|---|---|
| 33.14.01 | Kalijambe | 48.47 | 47,135 | 52,619 | 53,869 | Banaran | 14 | 57275 |
| 33.14.02 | Plupuh | 50.41 | 42,394 | 50,897 | 53,972 | Sambirejo | 16 | 57283 |
| 33.14.03 | Masaran | 46.84 | 69,319 | 77,591 | 79,537 | Masaran | 13 | 57282 |
| 33.14.04 | Kedawung | 53.06 | 57,139 | 65,812 | 68,402 | Bendungan | 10 | 57292 |
| 33.14.05 | Sambirejo | 45.82 | 35,173 | 40,716 | 42,421 | Sambirejo | 9 | 57293 |
| 33.14.06 | Gondang | 46.83 | 41,454 | 47,085 | 48,609 | Gondang | 9 | 57254 |
| 33.14.07 | Sambung Macan | 43.81 | 43,907 | 48,466 | 49,347 | Banaran | 9 | 57253 |
| 33.14.08 | Ngrampal | 39.84 | 36,867 | 42,484 | 44,166 | Pilangsari | 8 | 57252 |
| 33.14.09 | Karangmalang | 46.01 | 62,367 | 73,120 | 76,653 | Puro | 10 ^{(a)} | 57222 ^{(b)} |
| 33.14.10 | Sragen (town) | 27.64 | 66,660 | 69,558 | 70,786 | Sragen Tengah | 8 ^{(b)} | 57211: 57216 |
| 33.14.11 | Sidoharjo | 49.03 | 50,634 | 57,768 | 59,766 | Jetak | 12 | 57281 |
| 33.14.12 | Tanon | 52.69 | 50,631 | 58,590 | 61,034 | Gabugan | 16 | 57277 |
| 33.14.13 | Gemolong | 39.91 | 45,365 | 51,981 | 53,891 | Gemolong | 14 ^{(d)} | 57274 |
| 33.14.14 | Miri | 56.86 | 31,994 | 36,597 | 37,910 | Girimargo | 10 | 57276 |
| 33.14.15 | Sumberlawang | 79.43 | 43,525 | 50,032 | 51,951 | Ngandul | 11 | 57272 |
| 33.14.16 | Mondokan | 50.77 | 33,350 | 38,981 | 40,804 | Kedawung | 9 | 57271 |
| 33.14.17 | Sukodono | 47.43 | 29,108 | 33,370 | 34,605 | Majenang | 9 | 57263 |
| 33.14.18 | Gesi | 40.81 | 19,558 | 22,760 | 23,777 | Gesi | 7 | 57262 |
| 33.14.19 | Tangen | 56.92 | 25,591 | 29,117 | 30,084 | Katelan | 7 | 57261 |
| 33.14.20 | Jenar | 71.98 | 26,100 | 29,407 | 30,240 | Dawung | 7 | 57256 |
| | Totals | 994.57 | 858,266 | 976,951 | 1,011,824 | Sragen | 208 | |

Notes: (a) including two kelurahan (Kroyo and Plumbungan). (b) except for the kelurahan of Kroyo, which has a postcode of 57221.
(c) comprising six kelurahan (Sine, Sragen Kulon, Sragen Tengah, Sragen Wetan, Nglorog and Karang Tengah) and two desa.
(d) including four kelurahan (Ngembat Padas, Kragilan, Gemolong and Kwangen).

== Sragen town ==
Sragen town is divided into the following ten villages (comprising eight urban kelurahan and two rural desa - the latter listed at the end of the table), tabulated below with their areas and their populations according to the 2023 official estimates, together with their postcodes.

| Kode Wilayah | Name | Area (km^{2}) | Pop'n Estimate 2023 | Post code |
|---|---|---|---|---|
| 33.14.10.1001 | Sine | 3.68 | 6,329 | 57213 |
| 33.14.10.1002 | Sragen Kulon | 2.52 | 16,521 | 57212 |
| 33.14.10.1003 | Sragen Tengah | 1.43 | 8,163 | 57211 |
| 33.14.10.1004 | Sragen Wetan | 2.19 | 15,595 | 57214 |
| 33.14.10.1005 | Nglorog | 3.87 | 7,830 | 57215 |
| 33.14.10.1006 | Karang Tengah | 3.74 | 5,731 | 57216 |
| 33.14.10.2007 | Tangkil | 4.46 | 5,647 | 57211 |
| 33.14.10.2008 | Kedungupit | 5.74 | 6,996 | 57211 |

== Climate ==
Sragen has a tropical monsoon climate (Am) with moderate to little rainfall from June to September and heavy rainfall from October to May.

Climate data for Sragen
| Month | Jan | Feb | Mar | Apr | May | Jun | Jul | Aug | Sep | Oct | Nov | Dec | Year |
|---|---|---|---|---|---|---|---|---|---|---|---|---|---|
| Mean daily maximum °C (°F) | 30.8 (87.4) | 30.7 (87.3) | 31.0 (87.8) | 31.7 (89.1) | 31.4 (88.5) | 31.5 (88.7) | 31.6 (88.9) | 32.4 (90.3) | 33.4 (92.1) | 33.7 (92.7) | 32.8 (91.0) | 31.7 (89.1) | 31.9 (89.4) |
| Daily mean °C (°F) | 26.5 (79.7) | 26.5 (79.7) | 26.6 (79.9) | 27.0 (80.6) | 26.6 (79.9) | 26.1 (79.0) | 25.6 (78.1) | 26.0 (78.8) | 26.9 (80.4) | 27.6 (81.7) | 27.5 (81.5) | 26.9 (80.4) | 26.6 (80.0) |
| Mean daily minimum °C (°F) | 22.2 (72.0) | 22.3 (72.1) | 22.3 (72.1) | 22.3 (72.1) | 21.8 (71.2) | 20.7 (69.3) | 19.6 (67.3) | 19.6 (67.3) | 20.5 (68.9) | 21.6 (70.9) | 22.2 (72.0) | 22.2 (72.0) | 21.4 (70.6) |
| Average rainfall mm (inches) | 305 (12.0) | 307 (12.1) | 319 (12.6) | 213 (8.4) | 149 (5.9) | 63 (2.5) | 58 (2.3) | 32 (1.3) | 52 (2.0) | 144 (5.7) | 226 (8.9) | 260 (10.2) | 2,128 (83.9) |
Source: Climate-Data.org
