= Persikas Semarang =

Indonesian football club

Persikas
- Full name: Persatuan Sepakbola Indonesia Kabupaten Semarang
- Nickname: Laskar Hanoman
- Founded: 1967; 59 years ago
- Ground: Wujil Stadium; Semarang Regency, Central Java
- Capacity: 2,000
- Owner: Semarang Regency Government
- Chairman: Wawan Hari Purwanto
- Manager: Ari Dwi Setyanto
- Coach: Asmuni Syaefudin
- League: Liga 4
Home colours	Away colours

Persatuan Sepakbola Indonesia Kabupaten Semarang (simply known as Persikas) is an Indonesian football club based in Semarang Regency, Central Java. They currently compete in Liga 4 Central Java zone.

== Season-by-season records ==
Season(s)	League/Division	Tms.	Pos.	Piala Indonesia
2010–11	Second Division	78	Withdrew	–
2014	Liga Nusantara	16	Eliminated in Provincial round	–
2015	Liga Nusantara	season abandoned		–
2016				
2017
2018
2019
2020
2021–22
2022–23	Disqualified			
2023–24				
2024–25
2025–26
