= Persab Brebes =

Indonesian football club

- Full name: Persatuan Sepakbola Brebes
- Nicknames: Laskar Ki Jaka Poleng (Ki Jaka Poleng's Warriors); Kuda Putih (The White Horse)
- Founded: 1964; 62 years ago
- Ground: Karangbirahi Stadium; Brebes, Central Java
- Capacity: 6,000
- Owner: PT. Brebes Oniosport
- Chairman: Asrofi
- Manager: Heri Fitriansyah
- Coach: Sendi Oktavian
- League: Liga 4
- 2024–25: Quarter-finals, (Central Java zone)
| Home colours | Away colours |

Persatuan Sepakbola Brebes, commonly known as Persab, is an Indonesian football club based in Brebes Regency, Central Java. They currently compete in the Liga 4.

== History ==
Persab Brebes was established in 1964, In fact, since officially registered as a legal entity, Football Association of Indonesia or PSSI has moved to form football organization administrators in areas starting from the provincial level, until then the euphoria of football development finally reached Brebes in 1960.

In the 1960s, several football associations emerged in Brebes where one of the most popular teams at that time was PS AL-Fajar Brebes, AL-Fajar Brebes managed to capture the attention of the Brebes public after several times winning the Regional Tournament, until finally, the management of AL-Fajar at that time took the initiative to register as a member of PSSI, starting from here Then the AL-Fajar Management formed the Brebes Regency Football Association, which was abbreviated as PERSAB BREBES.

Precisely in 1964, at that time it was still the Perserikatan era so that most regions used the name of their regional Football Association. In 1964 it was also the first time that Brebes registered in the Central Java Regional Executive level competition, Rubaedi was one of the most popular players from the 1970s-1980s, as he grew older, Ruba dimmed as a player. After that, a star player from the Brebes gridiron in the 1980s-1990s, Iryando 'Yando', even appeared around the world until the Galatama era rolled around.

== Season-by-season records ==
| Season(s) | League/Division | Tms. | Pos. | Piala Indonesia |
|---|---|---|---|---|
| 2014 | Liga Nusantara | 16 | Eliminated in Provincial round | – |
| 2015 | | | | |
2016
| 2017 | Liga 3 | 32 | Eliminated in Provincial round | – |
| 2018 | Liga 3 | 32 | Eliminated in Regional round | – |
| 2019 | Withdrew | | | |
| 2020 | Liga 3 | season abandoned | | – |
| 2021–22 | Liga 3 | 64 | Eliminated in Provincial round | – |
| 2022–23 | Liga 3 | season abandoned | | – |
| 2023–24 | Liga 3 | 80 | 3rd, First round | – |
| 2024–25 | Liga 4 | 64 | Eliminated in Provincial round | – |
| 2025–26 | | | | |

== Ground ==
Persab Brebes held training and held matches using the same stadium, namely the Karang Birahi Stadium or SKB Brebes.

== Players ==
=== Current squad ===
As of 31 October 2023

Note: Flags indicate national team as defined under FIFA eligibility rules; some limited exceptions apply. Players may hold more than one non-FIFA nationality.

| No. | Pos. | Nation | Player |
|---|---|---|---|
| 1 | GK | IDN | Amrin Khanan |
| 2 | DF | IDN | Hais Weno |
| 5 | MF | IDN | Hasim Palip |
| 7 | FW | IDN | Agus Sidiq |
| 8 | DF | IDN | Nugroho M |
| 9 | FW | IDN | Wawan Agus |
| 11 | MF | IDN | Fauzil Adhim |
| 12 | FW | IDN | Reza Aditya |
| 13 | FW | IDN | Reynaldi Surya |
| 14 | MF | IDN | Ericko Valentino |
| 15 | FW | IDN | Noel Cristian |
| 16 | DF | IDN | Nurul Imam |
| 17 | MF | IDN | Achmad Billal |
| 18 | DF | IDN | Dadang Supena |

| No. | Pos. | Nation | Player |
|---|---|---|---|
| 19 | DF | IDN | Khoirul Ma'arif |
| 21 | MF | IDN | Andris Leo Felle |
| 25 | FW | IDN | Ali Mashor |
| 26 | MF | IDN | Badrus Zaman |
| 27 | DF | IDN | Mohammad Restu |
| 30 | DF | IDN | Sofian Dwi |
| 41 | DF | IDN | Achmad Fachrul |
| 45 | FW | IDN | Samsul Pelu |
| 46 | MF | IDN | Ayeup Yulianto |
| 47 | GK | IDN | Abdullah Tsany |
| 98 | GK | IDN | Stevano Alexander |
| 99 | MF | IDN | David Darmawan |

== Supporter ==
Sabermania
Sabermania is a supporter of Persab Brebes with light blue & black colors, Sabermania is a forum for friendship with Persab Brebes supporters which was established in 2009 and has the tagline #OraOlihOra as a special greeting from supporter located in the South Tribune of Karangbirahi Stadium, Brebes.

== Notable players ==
- (Indonesia) Egy Maulana Vikri
- (Indonesia) Witan Sulaeman
