= Persikaba Blora =

Indonesian football club

Persikaba
- Full name: Persatuan Sepakbola Indonesia Blora
- Nicknames: Laskar Arya Penangsang; Kuda Gagakrimang
- Short name: BLR
- Founded: 6 July 1967; 58 years ago
- Ground: Kridosono Stadium; Blora Regency, Central Java
- Capacity: 10,000
- Owner: Blora Regency Government
- Chairman: Mariyanto
- Coach: Heri Fianto
- League: Liga 4
- 2021: 4th in Group A, (Central Java zone)
Home colours	Away colours

Persatuan Sepakbola Indonesia Blora (simply known as Persikaba) is an Indonesian football club based in Blora Regency, Central Java. They currently compete in Liga 4 Central Java zone.

== Season-by-season records ==
Season(s)	League/Division	Tms.	Pos.	Piala Indonesia
2010	First Division	57	5th, First stage	–
2011–12	First Division	66	4th, First stage	–
2013	First Division	77	6th, First round	–
2014	Liga Nusantara	16	Eliminated in Provincial round	–
2015	Liga Nusantara	season abandoned		–
2016	ISC Liga Nusantara	32	Eliminated in Provincial round	–
2017	Liga 3	32	Eliminated in Provincial round	–
2018	Liga 3	32	Eliminated in Provincial round	–
2019	Liga 3	32	Eliminated in Provincial round	–
2020	Liga 3	season abandoned		–
2021–22	Liga 3	64	Eliminated in Provincial round	–
2022–23	Liga 3	season abandoned		–
2023–24				
2024–25
2025–26	Liga 4	64	Eliminated in Provincial round	–
