= 2022–23 Liga 3 (Indonesia) =

Seventh season of the Liga 3 in Indonesia

Liga 3
- Season: 2022–23
- Dates: Provincial Round: 6 August – 13 January 2023; National Round: canceled

2022–23 Liga 3 was the sixth season of the Liga 3 under the current name and the seventh season under the current league structure, and the only amateur league football competition in Indonesia. The tournament was organized by Provincial Association of PSSI for the provincial round and PSSI for the national round.

Teams that qualify for the last 8 of Liga 3 are entitled to promotion to 2023–24 Liga 2. Karo United was the champion in the previous season.

The league along with 2022–23 Liga 2 were abandoned due to a combination of factors, the most notable of them was the Kanjuruhan Stadium disaster.

== Team changes ==
The following teams changed divisions after the 2021 season.

To Liga 3

Relegated from 2021–22 Liga 2

- PS Mitra Kukar
- Badak Lampung
- KS Tiga Naga
- Hizbul Wathan

From Liga 3

Promotion from 2021–22 Liga 3

- Karo United
- Putra Delta Sidoarjo
- Mataram Utama (changed name to Nusantara United)
- PSDS Deli Serdang
- Deltras
- Persikab Bandung
- Gresik United
- Persipa Pati

== Rules ==
Here are some rules for the 2022 season:

=== Participating team ===
- PSSI member clubs or PSSI member candidate clubs who have completed the registration administration requirements as a member of PSSI and have received approval at the relevant provincial PSSI annual congress.
- Registration of participating clubs via the online system SIAP (Sistem Informasi dan Administrasi PSSI).
- All clubs participating in Liga 3 2022 compete in the provincial round, there is no pre-national round for the participants of Liga 3 2021–2022 to reach the last 16 of the National Round.
- Aspects of football development, enough time lag between one match to another.

=== Player ===
- The age of the players is the birth of January 1, 2000 to December 31, 2004 and 5 senior players.
- The maximum number of registered players is 35 players.
- Minimum trainer license AFC C License.
- The maximum number of registered officials is 10 peoples.
- Player registration via online system SIAP (Sistem Informasi dan Administrasi PSSI).

== Provincial league ==
#	Provincial Leagues (Teams)	Winners
**Sumatra Island**
1	Aceh (cancelled)	
2	North Sumatra (19)	
3	West Sumatra (cancelled)	
4	Riau (19)	
5	Riau Islands	757 Kepri Jaya
6	Jambi (cancelled)	
7	Bengkulu (19)	
8	South Sumatra (12)	Persimuba
9	Bangka Belitung Islands (cancelled)	
10	Lampung (cancelled)	
**Java Island**
11	Banten (21)	Serpong City
12	Special Region of Jakarta (cancelled)	
13	West Java (55)	Persipasi
14	Central Java (39)	Persip
15	Special Region of Yogyakarta (18)	
16	East Java (58)	
**Lesser Sunda Islands**
17	Bali (15)	Perseden
18	West Nusa Tenggara (26)	
19	East Nusa Tenggara (24)	Perse
**Kalimantan Island**
20	West Kalimantan (cancelled)	
21	Central Kalimantan (cancelled)	
22	South Kalimantan (11)	Persetala
23	East Kalimantan (23)	
24	North Kalimantan (cancelled)	
**Sulawesi Island**
25	North Sulawesi (cancelled)	
26	Gorontalo (27)	Persidago
27	Central Sulawesi (17)	Persipal Palu Youth
28	West Sulawesi (TBD)	
29	South Sulawesi (14)	Persibone
30	Southeast Sulawesi (TBD)	
**Maluku Islands**
31	North Maluku (TBD)	Morotai United
32	(Maluku (province)) Maluku (7)	Maluku
**Papua Island**
33	(West Papua (province)) West Papua (TBD)	
34	(Papua (province)) Papua (7)	Persipani

Notes:

- BOLD: Winner of each provincial league.
- The number of slots for each province will be determined by the respective Provincial Associations with the approval of the PSSI.

== See also ==
- 2022–23 Liga 1
- 2022–23 Liga 2
- 2022–23 Piala Indonesia
