= 2018 PSIS Semarang season =

Indonesian football club season

PSIS Semarang
2018 season
- Chairman: Yoyok Sukawi
- Manager: Jafri Sastra
Home colours	Away colours

In the 2018 season, the Indonesian football club PSIS Semarang played in Liga 1. Bruno Silva was the top goalscorer.

== Squad ==
As of 11 August 2018

No.	Name	Nat.	Date of birth (age)	Since	Signed from	Apps	Goals
Goalkeepers
20	Sendri Johansyah	(Indonesia)	June 11, 1993 (aged 24)	2018	(Indonesia) Persibat Batang	0	0
30	Jandia Eka Putra	(Indonesia)	July 14, 1987 (aged 30)	2018	Semen Padang F.C.	0	0
33	Aji Bayu Putra	(Indonesia)	May 11, 1993 (aged 24)	2017	(Indonesia) Adhyaksa FC	20	0
98	Satriawan Eka Putra	(Indonesia)	October 2, 1998 (aged 19)	2018	(Indonesia) PSIS U-19	0	0
Defenders
2	Jawwad Jazil El Wafa	(Indonesia)	June 13, 1997 (aged 20)	2018	(Indonesia) PSIS U-19	0	0
3	Mohammad Hidayatulloh	(Indonesia)	November 8, 1997 (aged 20)	2018	(Indonesia) PSIS U-19	0	0
5	Haudi Abdillah	(Indonesia)	April 20, 1993 (aged 24)	2017	(Indonesia) PSCS Cilacap	17	0
6	Tegar Infantri	(Indonesia)	May 8, 1999 (aged 18)	2018	(Indonesia) PPLP Jawa Tengah	0	0
13	Fauzan Fajri	(Indonesia)	May 18, 1989 (aged 28)	2018	(Indonesia) Kaltim Putra	0	0
15	Frendi Saputra	(Indonesia)	January 27, 1992 (aged 25)	2018	(Indonesia) Perserang Serang	0	0
17	Muhammad Rio Saputra	(Indonesia)	December 7, 1995 (aged 22)	2016	(Indonesia) Persijap Jepara	13	0
19	Akbar Riansyah	(Indonesia)	June 3, 1993 (aged 24)	2018	(Indonesia) Persis Solo	0	0
23	Gilang Ginarsa	(Indonesia)	May 14, 1988 (aged 29)	2018	(Indonesia) Sriwijaya F.C.	0	0
25	Petar Planić	(Serbia)	March 16, 1989 (aged 28)	2018	(Moldova) Speranța Nisporeni	0	0
27	Safrudin Tahar	(Indonesia)	December 13, 1993 (aged 24)	2014	(Indonesia) PSM Makassar	30	1
97	Muhammad Syukron	(Indonesia)	February 24, 1997 (aged 20)	2018	(Indonesia) Cilegon United	0	0
Midfielders
7	Muhamad Yunus	(Indonesia)	July 7, 1988 (aged 29)	2013	(Indonesia) Persitema	36	9
24	Hapit Ibrahim	(Indonesia)	May 12, 1993 (aged 24)	2018	(Indonesia) Sriwijaya FC	0	0
37	Ruud Gullit S Junus	(Indonesia)	December 9, 1992 (aged 25)	2017	(Indonesia) Martapura FC	10	0
55	Ibrahim Conteh	(Sierra Leone)	November 2, 1997 (aged 20)	2018	(Indonesia) PS TNI	0	0
77	Akhlidin Israilov	(Kyrgyzstan)	September 16, 1994 (aged 23)	2018	(India) Neroca F.C.	0	0
92	Bayu Nugroho	(Indonesia)	May 11, 1992 (aged 25)	2018	(Indonesia) Persis Solo	0	0
99	Gustur Cahyo	(Indonesia)	January 11, 1997 (aged 20)	2018	(Indonesia) PS TNI	0	0
Forwards
8	Albi Lanju Pamungkas	(Indonesia)	February 14, 1997 (aged 20)	2018	(Indonesia) PSIS U-19	0	0
9	Erik Dwi Ermawansyah	(Indonesia)	April 19, 1996 (aged 21)	2017	(Indonesia) Madura United F.C.	24	5
10	Komarudin	(Indonesia)	July 19, 1995 (aged 22)	2018	(Indonesia) Persegres Gresik United	0	0
11	Aldaier Makatindu	(Indonesia)	May 25, 1992 (aged 25)	2018	(Indonesia) Madura F.C.	12	1
22	Hari Nur Yulianto	(Indonesia)	July 31, 1989 (aged 28)	2013	(Indonesia) PSCS Cilacap	75	34
88	Bruno Silva	(Brazil)	April 14, 1991 (aged 26)	2018	(Brazil) AS Arapiraquense	0	0
94	Melcior Leideker Majefat	(Indonesia)	April 20, 1994 (aged 23)	2018	(Indonesia) Persiba Balikpapan	0	0
	Arif Yanggi Rahman	(Indonesia)	February 20, 1994 (aged 23)	2018	(Indonesia) Persik Kediri	0	0

== Transfer ==
=== In ===
Date	Pos.	Player	Age	moving from	source
19 December 2017	GK	(Indonesia) Sendri Johansyah	24	(Indonesia) Persibat Batang	
19 December 2017	FW	(Indonesia) Hapidin	26	(Indonesia) Persibat Batang	
22 December 2017	DF	(Indonesia) Frendi Saputra	25	(Indonesia) Perserang Serang	
29 December 2017	FW	(Indonesia) Arif Yanggi Rahman	23	(Indonesia) Persik Kediri	
17 December 2017	FW	(Indonesia) Komarudin	22	(Indonesia) Persegres Gresik United	
17 December 2017	MF	(Indonesia) Bayu Nugroho	25	(Indonesia) Persis Solo	
16 December 2017	DF	(Indonesia) Akbar Riansyah	24	(Indonesia) Persis Solo	
29 December 2017	MF	(Indonesia) Gustur Cahyo	20	(Indonesia) PS TNI	
11 January 2018	DF	(Serbia) Petar Planić	20	(Moldova) Speranța Nisporeni	
29 December 2017	MF	(Sierra Leone) Ibrahim Conteh	21	(Indonesia) PS TNI	
8 January 2018	DF	(Indonesia) Muhammad Syukron	20	(Indonesia) Cilegon United	
8 January 2018	DF	(Indonesia) Fauzan Fajri	28	(Indonesia) Kaltim Putra FC	
16 January 2018	DF	(Indonesia) Gilang Ginarsa	29	(Indonesia) Sriwijaya FC	
3 February 2018	GK	(Indonesia) Ferdiansyah	34	(Indonesia) Persela Lamongan	
13 February 2018	GK	(Indonesia) Jandia Eka Putra	30	(Indonesia) Semen Padang F.C.	
26 February 2018	FW	(Brazil) Bruno Silva	26	(Brazil) AS Arapiraquense	
2 March 2018	MF	(Kyrgyzstan) Akhlidin Israilov	23	(India) NEROCA F.C.	

==== Loan in ====
Date	Pos.	Player	Age	moving from	source
21 December 2017	MF	(Indonesia) Hapit Ibrahim	24	(Indonesia) Sriwijaya FC	

=== Out ===
Date	Pos.	Player	Age	move to	source
19 December 2017	DF	(Indonesia) Taufik Hidayat	24	(Indonesia) Bali United F.C.	
10 December 2017	MF	(Indonesia) Ahmad Agung	21	(Indonesia) Bali United F.C.	
17 December 2017	FW	(Indonesia) Rifal Lastori	20	(Indonesia) Borneo FC (Loan Return)	
23 February 2017	GK	(Indonesia) Fajar Setya Jaya	22	(Indonesia) Persiba Balikpapan	

== Pre-season and friendlies ==
28 December 2017 Friendly	PSIS Semarang	4–0	PPLM Jakarta	Semarang, Indonesia
	Komarudin 9'; Hari Nur Yulianto 10'; Arif Yanggi 53'; Agi Pratama 90+1'			Stadium: Citarum Stadium

4 January 2018 Friendly	Arema FC	5–3	PSIS Semarang	Malang, Indonesia
	Ahmet Ataýew 20' (pen.); Dedik Setiawan 38'; Rodrigo Ost 42'; Arthur Cunha 60'; Nur Hardianto 73'		Hapidin 9'; Bayu Nugroho 15'; Hari Nur Yulianto 65' (pen.)	Stadium: Gajayana Stadium

7 January 2018 Friendly	PSIS Semarang	0–1	Arema FC	Magelang, Indonesia
			Hendro Siswanto 23'	Stadium: Moch. Soebroto Stadium

10 January 2018 Friendly	Bali United F.C.	0–1	PSIS Semarang	Gianyar, Indonesia
			Hari Nur Yulianto 71'	Stadium: I Wayan Dipta Stadium

16 January 2018 Friendly	PSIS Semarang	3–0	PS AD	Semarang, Indonesia
	Bayu Nugroho 27'; Gustur Cahyo 40'; Edward Junior Wilson 80'			Stadium: Terang Bangsa Trigoria

20 January 2018 President's Cup	Bhayangkara F.C.	1–0	PSIS Semarang	Malang, Indonesia
	Jajang Mulyana 67'			Stadium: Gajayana Stadium; Attendance: 1,461; Referee: Dodi Setia Purnama

25 January 2018 President's Cup	PSIS Semarang	1–3	Arema FC	Malang Regency
	Hari Nur Yulianto 67'		Rio 4' (o.g.); Alfarizi 8'; Furtuoso 47'	Stadium: Kanjuruhan Stadium; Attendance: 8,093; Referee: Faulur Rosy

30 January 2018 President's Cup	PSIS Semarang	1–0	Persela Lamongan	Malang Regency
	Bayu Nugroho 56'			Stadium: Kanjuruhan Stadium

== Competitions ==
=== Matches ===
24 Mar 2018 1	PSM Makassar	2–0	PSIS Semarang	Makassar, South Sulawesi
19:30 UTC+8	Pluim 56'; R. Pellu 84'			Stadium: Andi Mattalatta Stadium

1 Apr 2018 2	PSIS	0–0	Bali United	Magelang, Central Java
16:30 UTC+8		Report		Stadium: Moch. Soebroto Stadium; Attendance: 11,372; Referee: Novari Ikhsan

7 Apr 2018 3	Bhayangkara FC	0–0	PSIS	Sidoarjo, East Java
16:30 UTC+8	Komazec 42'	Report	Hari Nur 58'	Stadium: Gelora Delta Stadium

15 Apr 2018 4	PSIS	4–1	PSMS	Magelang, Central Java
16:30 UTC+8	Bruno Silva 40' 45+2' 63'; Ibrahim Conteh 43'	Report	Frets Butuan 49'	Stadium: Moch. Soebroto Stadium

20 Apr 2018 5	PSIS	1–4	Persija	Magelang, Central Java
16:30 UTC+8	Melcior Majefat 90+3'		Jaimerson Xavier 69'; Safrudin Tahar (81(og.)); Marko Šimić 85'; Ramdani Lestaluhu 90+2'	Stadium: Moch. Soebroto Stadium

29 Apr 2018 6	Perseru	1–0	PSIS	Yapen Islands Regency, Papua
16:30 UTC+8	Sílvio Escobar 71'			Stadium: Marora Stadium

7 May 2018 7	PSIS	3–1	Persela	Magelang, Central Java
16:30 UTC+8	Hari Nur 61'; Wallace Costa (65 (og.)); Bayu Nugroho 84'		Loris Arnaud 90'	Stadium: Moch. Soebroto Stadium

== Squad statistics ==
=== Squad & Appearances ===
No.	Pos.	Name	Liga 1		Piala Indonesia		Total	
No.	Pos.	Name	Apps	Goals	Apps	Goals	Apps	Goals
Goalkeepers
20	GK	(Indonesia) Sendri Johansyah	1	0	1	0	0	0
30	GK	(Indonesia) Jandia Eka Putra	24	0	0	0	0	0
33	GK	(Indonesia) Aji Bayu Putra	3	0	0	0	0	0
98	GK	(Indonesia) Satriawan Eka Putra	0	0	0	0	0	0
Defenders
2	DF	(Indonesia) Jawwad Jazil El Wafa	0	0	1	0	1	0
3	DF	(Indonesia) Mohammad Hidayatulloh	0	0	0	0	0	0
5	DF	(Indonesia) Haudi Abdillah	27	0	0	0	27	0
6	DF	(Indonesia) Tegar Infantri	0	0	1	0	1	0
13	DF	(Indonesia) Fauzan Fajri	12	0	2	1	14	1
15	DF	(Indonesia) Frendi Saputra	20	0	1	0	21	0
17	DF	(Indonesia) Muhammad Rio Saputra	11	0	2	0	13	0
19	DF	(Indonesia) Akbar Riansyah	5	0	1	0	6	0
23	DF	(Indonesia) Gilang Ginarsa	25	0	1	0	26	0
25	DF	(Serbia) Petar Planić	29	0	0	0	29	0
27	DF	(Indonesia) Safrudin Tahar	26	0	0	0	26	0
97	DF	(Indonesia) Muhammad Syukron	0	0	0	0	0	0
Midfielders
7	MF	(Indonesia) Muhammad Yunus	26	0	0	0	26	0
24	MF	(Indonesia) Hapit Ibrahim	18	0	2	0	20	0
37	MF	(Indonesia) Ruud Gullit S Junus	0	0	0	0	0	0
55	MF	(Sierra Leone) Ibrahim Conteh	29	5	1	1	30	6
77	MF	(Kyrgyzstan) Akhlidin Israilov	5	0	0	0	5	0
92	MF	(Indonesia) Bayu Nugroho	33	5	0	0	33	5
99	MF	(Indonesia) Gustur Cahyo	8	0	1	1	9	1
Forwards
8	MF	(Indonesia) Albi Ladju Pamungkas	0	0	1	0	1	0
9	MF	(Indonesia) Erik Dwi Ermawansyah	0	0	0	0	1	0
10	FW	(Indonesia) Komarudin	29	1	0	0	29	0
11	FW	(Indonesia) Aldaier Makatindu	20	0	2	0	22	0
22	FW	(Indonesia) Hari Nur Yulianto	34	10	0	0	34	10
88	FW	(Brazil) Bruno Silva	31	16	0	0	31	16
94	FW	(Indonesia) Melcior Leideker Majefat	16	1	2	1	18	1

Last updated: 10 December 2018.
