= 2017 PSIS Semarang season =

PSIS Semarang
2017 season
- Chairman: (Indonesia) Yoyok Sukawi
- Manager: (Indonesia) Subangkit
- 2017 Liga 2: 3rd
- Top goalscorer: League: All: Melcior & Hari Nur (6 Gol)
Home colours	Away colours

== Preparation ==
To face the 2017 season, the club prepared the team from November 2016 onwards. The management wanted to hire a head coach with a good record and good experience. Subangkit was the answer, and he signed a contract with PSIS Semarang on 30 November 2016. Subangkit said "I love a challenge and target, PSIS have the both of that, It's an attractive challenge furthermore PSIS Semarang have mission to promote to Liga1".

== Transfer ==
=== In ===
Transfer windows I

- (Indonesia) Ferry Bagus Kurniawan (Persiharjo Unsa Azmi)
- (Indonesia) Saddam Sudarma Hendra (Persiba Bantul)
- (Indonesia) Juni Riyadi (PSIM Yogyakarta)
- (Indonesia) Haudi Abdillah (PSCS Cilacap)
- (Indonesia) Ruud Gullit S. Junus (Martapura FC)
- (Indonesia) Imam Baihaqi (Celebest FC Palu)
- (Indonesia) Erik Dwi Ermawansah (Madura United FC)
- (Indonesia) Jawwad Jazil El Wafa (Gresik United)
- (Indonesia) Ilham Arfil Haqq (Gresik United)
- (Indonesia) Achmad Rezal (Bhayangkara FC)

Transfer windows II

- (Indonesia) Nanang Wahyudi (Madiun Putra FC)
- (Indonesia) Ali Khomaedi (Persekap Pasuruan)
- (Indonesia) Adit Wafa (Persijap Jepara)
- (Indonesia) Solihul Islam (Persibas Banyumas)
- (Indonesia) Aldaier Makatindu (Madura F.C.)
- (Indonesia) Andrid Wibawa (Persis Solo)
- (Indonesia) Gatot Wahyudi (Persik Kendal)

=== Out ===
Transfer windows I

- (Indonesia) Ivan Febriyanto (PSIM Yogyakarta)
- (Indonesia) Bayu Andra Cahyadi (Persis Solo)
- (Indonesia) Herry Susilo (Persipur Purwodadi)
- (Indonesia) Arif Yanggi Rahman Persik Kediri)
- (Indonesia) Dedi Cahyono Putro (Persis Solo)
- (Indonesia) Iwan Wahyudi (Persip Pekalongan)
- (Indonesia) Ganjar Mukti (PS TNI)
- (Indonesia) Syaiful Amar (Persab Brebes)
- (Indonesia) Feri Ariawan (release)
- (Indonesia) Andrianto Ariza (release)
- (Indonesia) Dwi Chandra Rukmana (PSMS Medan)
- (Indonesia) Akhsay Rismawanto (release)
- (Indonesia) Vicky Melano (757 Kepri Jaya FC)

Transfer windows II

- (Indonesia) Saddam Sudarma Hendra (release)
- (Indonesia) Juni Riyadi (release)
- (Indonesia) Imam Baihaqi (release)
- (Indonesia) Dani Raharjianto (release)
- (Indonesia) Johan Yoga Utama (release)
- (Indonesia) Awan Setho Raharjo (Bhayangkara F.C./terminate a loan)

=== loan in ===
Nama	Dari
Awan Setho Raharjo	Bhayangkara FC
Rifal Lastori	Pusamania Borneo FC
Melcior Leideker Majefat	Persiba Balikpapan

=== Loan Out ===
Nama	Dari
Jordan Foranda	Persipur Purwodadi

== Squad ==
(last update November 2017)

No.	Nama	Negara	Posisi	Tanggal Lahir (Usia)	Klub Sebelumnya
Goalkeepers
1	Fajar Setya Jaya	(Indonesia)	GK	November 17, 1995 (aged 21)	(Indonesia) PSIS Semarang
25	Ferry Bagus Kurniawan	(Indonesia)	GK	September 10, 1994 (aged 22)	(Indonesia) Persiharjo-Unsa Azmi
30	Satriawan Eka Putra	(Indonesia)	GK		(Indonesia) PSIS Magang
33	Aji Bayu Putra	(Indonesia)	GK	May 11, 1993 (aged 23)	(Indonesia) Adhyaksa FC
Defenders
3	Nanang Wahyudi	(Indonesia)	LB	February 18, 1994 (aged 21)	(Indonesia) Madiun Putra FC
4	Muhammad Rio Saputra	(Indonesia)	CB	December 7, 1995 (aged 21)	(Indonesia) Persijap Jepara
5	M Tegar Pribadi	(Indonesia)	CB/FB	July 29, 1996 (aged 20)	(Indonesia) PPLP Jawa Tengah
6	Tegar Infantri	(Indonesia)	CB/DM	May 8, 1999 (aged 17)	(Indonesia) PPLP Jawa Tengah
16	Anhar Latif Prayogo	(Indonesia)	CB	May 24, 1994 (aged 22)	(Indonesia) Persisam Samarinda U-21
18	Yogi Ardianto	(Indonesia)	CB/DM	November 17, 1994 (aged 22)	(Indonesia) Persepar Palangkaraya
26	Taufik Hidayat	(Indonesia)	LB	March 20, 1993 (aged 23)	(Indonesia) PS Beltim
27	Safrudin Tahar	(Indonesia)	RB	December 13, 1993 (aged 23)	(Indonesia) PSM Makassar
29	Ali Khomaedi	(Indonesia)	CB	April 1, 1991 (aged 25)	(Indonesia) Persekap Pasuruan
35	Haudi Abdillah	(Indonesia)	CB	April 20, 1993 (aged 23)	(Indonesia) PSCS Cilacap
Midfielders
7	Franky Mahendra	(Indonesia)	RM/WG	June 6, 1991 (aged 25)	(Indonesia) Persipur
72	Adit Wafa	(Indonesia)	CM	November 25, 1995 (aged 21)	(Indonesia) Persijap Jepara
15	Ediyanto	(Indonesia)	DM	February 2, 1986 (aged 30)	(Indonesia) Persewon Wondama
19	Fajar Alfian (footballer)	(Indonesia)	CM		(Indonesia) Surabaya United
20	Solihul Islam	(Indonesia)	RM	May 25, 1994 (aged 22)	(Indonesia) Persibas Banyumas
21	Dani Raharjanto	(Indonesia)	AMF/CF	December 7, 1996 (aged 20)	(Indonesia) PPLP Jawa Tengah
28	Muhammad Ridwan	(Indonesia)	RM/RB	July 8, 1980 (aged 36)	(Indonesia) Sriwijaya FC
24	Ahmad Agung	(Indonesia)	DM	March 9, 1996 (aged 20)	(Indonesia) Berlian Rajawali FC
31	Muhamad Yunus	(Indonesia)	AMF	July 7, 1988 (aged 28)	(Indonesia) Persitema
37	Ruud Gullit S Junus	(Indonesia)	AMF	December 9, 1992 (aged 24)	(Indonesia) Martapura FC
Forwards
8	Albi Lanju Pamungkas	(Indonesia)	CF		(Indonesia) PSIS Yunior
9	Erik Dwi Ermawansyah	(Indonesia)	CF	April 19, 1996 (aged 20)	(Indonesia) Madura United F.C.
11	Aldaier Makatindu	(Indonesia)	CF	May 25, 1992 (aged 24)	(Indonesia) Madura F.C.
12	Andrid Wibawa	(Indonesia)	CF	September 15, 1990 (aged 26)	(Indonesia) Persis Solo
14	Gatot Wahyudi	(Indonesia)	CF	January 2, 1998 (aged 18)	(Indonesia) Persik Kendal
22	Hari Nur Yulianto	(Indonesia)	CF/AMF	July 31, 1989 (aged 27)	(Indonesia) PSCS Cilacap
76	Rifal Lastori	(Indonesia)	WG	June 9, 1997 (aged 19)	(Indonesia) Pusamania Borneo F.C.
94	Melcior Leideker Majefat	(Indonesia)	CF	April 20, 1994 (aged 22)	(Indonesia) Persiba Balikpapan

== Result ==
=== 2nd Stage ===
21 September 2017	PSIS Semarang	2–1	PSMS Medan	Kendal
	Mecior Majefat 48'; Ahmad Agung 87'		Dimas Drajad 27'	Stadium: Stadion Kebondalem

29 September 2017	Persita Tangerang	0–3	PSIS Semarang	Karawang
			Ahmad Agung 20'; Rifal Lastori 67' 78'	Stadium: Stadion Singaperbangsa

3 October 2017	PSIS Semarang	2–0	Persita Tangerang	Semarang
	Rifal Lastori 9', 30'			Stadium: Stadion Citarum

7 October 2017	PSMS Medan	3–1	PSIS Semarang	Medan
	Elthon Maran 48'; Suhandi 50'; Frets Butuan 69'		Taufik 35'	Stadium: Stadion Teladan

11 October 2017	PSIS Semarang	3–0	Persibat Batang	Kendal
	Taufik 37'; Erik Dwi 48'; Rio 58'			Stadium: Stadion Utama Kebondalem

=== a quarter-finals ===
15 November 2017	PSIS Semarang	0–1	Persebaya Surabaya	Bandung
			Irfan jaya 37'	Stadium: Stadion Gelora Bandung Lautan Api

18 November 2017	PSMP Mojokerto	3–0	PSIS Semarang	Bandung
			Rio 24'; Aldaier Makatindu 43'; Hari Nur Yulianto 74'	Stadium: Stadion Gelora Bandung Lautan Api

21 November 2017	PSIS Semarang	1–1	PSPS Pekanbaru	Bandung
	Haudi Abdillah 71'		Wahyu Kristanto 43'	Stadium: Stadion Gelora Bandung Lautan Api

=== Semi-finals ===
25 November 2017	PSMS Medan	2–0 (a.e.t.)	PSIS Semarang	Bandung
	Frets Butuan 114'; Dimas Drajat 118'			Stadium: Stadion Gelora Bandung Lautan Api; Referee: Nusur Fadilah

=== 3rd Place ===
25 November 2017	PSIS Semarang	6–4 (a.e.t.)	Martapura FC	Bandung
	Hari Nur Yulianto 6', 59', 85'; Aldaier Makatindu 43'; Andrid Wibawa 97', 110'		Rifan Nahumarury 9', 37'; Reza Saputra 47'; Aidil Bogel 80'	Stadium: Stadion Gelora Bandung Lautan Api; Referee: Aprisman Aranda
