= Putra (name) =

Putra (Sanskrit: पुत्र, meaning son) is a Malay and Indonesian name. It derives from the word for son in Sanskrit.

Notable people with the name include:

- Aleksandra Putra (born 1986), Polish competitive swimmer
- Aditya Putra Dewa (born 1990), Indonesian footballer
- Agripina Prima Rahmanto Putra (born 1991), Indonesian badminton player
- Ahmad Maulana Putra (born 1988), Indonesian footballer
- Aji Bayu Putra (born 1993), Indonesian footballer
- Andika Eka Putra (died 2016), Indonesian Islamic militant
- Andre Putra Wibowo (born 1996), Indonesian footballer
- Angga Febryanto Putra (born 1995), Indonesian footballer
- Arifin Putra (born 1987), German-Indonesian actor
- Arifki Eka Putra (born 1987), Indonesian footballer
- Asraruddin Putra Omar (born 1988), Malaysian footballer
- Beckham Putra (born 2001), Indonesian footballer
- Budi Putra (born 1972), a Jakarta, Indonesia-based journalist
- Caisar Putra Aditya (born 1989), Indonesian comedian, dancer, and actor
- Daniel Baskara Putra (born 1994), known personally as Hindia, Indonesian musician
- Dias Angga Putra (born 1989), Indonesian footballer
- Feby Eka Putra (born 1999), Indonesian footballer
- Eddy Santana Putra (born 1957), Indonesian politician who served as the mayor of Palembang
- Geraldine Johns-Putra (born 1982), Malaysian and Australian chess player
- Hanis Sagara Putra (born 1999), Indonesian footballer
- Hutomo Mandala Putra (born 1962), commonly known as Tommy Suharto, Indonesian businessman, politician, and convicted murderer
- I Komang Putra, Indonesian footballer
- Indra Putra Mahayuddin (born 1981), Malaysian footballer
- Iner Sontany Putra (born 1995), Indonesian footballer
- Jandia Eka Putra (born 1987), Indonesian footballer
- Jonathan Putra (born 1982), British television host and actor
- Krzysztof Putra (1957–2010), Polish politician
- Oki Dwi Putra (born 1983), Indonesian football referee
- Putra Erwiansyah (born 2004), Indonesian badminton player
- Putra Nababan (born 1974), Indonesian journalist
- Putra Tri Ramadani (born 2005), Indonesian competition climber
- Risqki Putra Utomo (born 1998), Indonesian footballer
- Rommy Diaz Putra (born 1980), Indonesian footballer
- Rudi Putra, Indonesian biologist
- Sisworo Gautama Putra (1938–1993), Indonesian film director and screenwriter
- Tengku Putra (born 1951), Malaysian corporate figure and a member of the Selangor Royal Family and Kelantan Royal Family
- Tjokorda Krishna Putra Sudharsana (born 1956), Balinese artist and the current prince of Ubud
- Tommy Rifka Putra (born 1984), Indonesian footballer
- Tuanku Syed Putra (1920–2000), the 6th Raja of Perlis (1945–2000) and the 3rd Yang di-Pertuan Agong of Malaya and later Malaysia (1960–1965)
- Tuanku Syed Faizuddin Putra Jamalullail (born 1967), Raja Muda (Crown Prince) of the Malaysian state of Perlis
- Tunku Abdul Rahman Putra, the first Prime Minister of Malaysia, whose name was used for the new city of Putrajaya
- Windu Hanggono Putra (born 1988), Indonesian footballer
