= List of Indonesian football transfers 2018 =

This is a list of Indonesian football transfers featuring at least one Liga 1 or Liga 2 club. The transfer window of Liga 1 for pre season was opened from 10 February 2018 to 5 April 2018 and for mid season was opened from 5 July 2018 to 3 August 2018. The club without flag in table below are from Indonesia.

== Transfers ==
Note: Those clubs in bold is currently play in Liga 1 this season and in italic is currently play in Liga 2 this season.

=== Pre Season ===
Date	Name	Moving From	Moving To	Type	Ref
24 November 2017	(Indonesia) Syakir Sulaiman	**Bali United**	Aceh United	Transfer	
December 2017	(Indonesia) Rivaldi Bawuo	Kalteng Putra	**Arema**	Transfer	
2 December 2017	(Indonesia) Evan Dimas	**Bhayangkara**	(Malaysia) Selangor	Transfer	
2 December 2017	(Indonesia) Ilham Armain	**Bhayangkara**	(Malaysia) Selangor	Transfer	
9 December 2017	(Indonesia) Jefri Kurniawan	**Persija**	**Arema**	Loan	
12 December 2017	(Indonesia) Herman Dzumafo Epandi	PSPS Riau	**Bhayangkara**	Transfer	
13 December 2017	(Indonesia) Ilija Spasojević	**Bhayangkara**	**Bali United**	Transfer	
19 December 2017	(Indonesia) I Made Wirahadi	**Bali United**	PSS	Transfer	
20 December 2017	(Indonesia) Terens Puhiri	**Borneo**	(Thailand) Port	Loan	
January 2018	(Indonesia) Ferinando Pahabol	**Persipura**	**Persebaya**	Transfer	
January 2018	(Indonesia) Ruben Sanadi	**Persipura**	**Persebaya**	Transfer	
January 2018	(Indonesia) Osvaldo Haay	**Persipura**	**Persebaya**	Transfer	
January 2018	(Indonesia) Nelson Alom	**Persipura**	**Persebaya**	Transfer	
6 January 2018	(Brazil) Otávio Dutra	**Bhayangkara**	**Persebaya**	Transfer	
27 January 2018	(Indonesia) Achmad Jufriyanto	**Persib**	(Malaysia) Kuala Lumpur	Transfer	
1 February 2018	(Indonesia) Oktovianus Maniani	Madura	Perserang	Transfer	
13 February 2018	(Indonesia) Jandia Eka Putra	Semen Padang	**PSIS**	Transfer	
23 February 2018	(Indonesia) Fajar Setya Jaya	**PSIS**	Persiba Balikpapan	Loan	
4 March 2018	(South Korea) Yoo-jae Hoon	**Persipura**	**Mitra Kukar**	Transfer	
16 March 2018	(Japan) Kunihiro Yamashita	**Borneo**	**Perseru**	Transfer	
17 March 2018	(Argentina) Jonatan Bauman	(Greece) PAE Kerkyra	**Persib**	Transfer	
19 March 2018	(Indonesia) Ferdinand Sinaga	(Malaysia) Kelantan	**PSM**	Transfer	

=== During The Season ===
For this season, kick off Liga 1 at 23 March 2018 and Liga 2 at 23 April 2018.

Date	Name	Moving From	Moving To	Type	Ref
27 March 2018	(Indonesia) Izaac Wanggai	**Persipura**	**Persebaya**	Transfer	
29 March 2018	(Indonesia) Ardi Idrus	Semen Padang	**Persib**	Transfer	
4 April 2018	(Indonesia) Ngurah Nanak	**Bali United**	Semen Padang	Transfer	
6 April 2018	(Indonesia) Azka Fauzi	**Bali United**	Persis	Transfer	
6 July 2018	(Brazil) Addison Alves	**Persija**	**Persipura**	Transfer	
22 April 2018	(Indonesia) Hapidin	**PSIS**	Persiraja	Transfer	
18 July 2018	(Indonesia) Joko Ribowo	**Arema**	**PSIS**	Transfer	
22 July 2018	(Indonesia) Tedi Berlian	**Borneo**	Persibat	Loan	
22 July 2018	(Indonesia) Dicky Prayoga	**Persela**	Kalteng Putra	Transfer	
23 July 2018	(Indonesia) Muhammad Rizky Darmawan	**Persija**	Persita	Loan	
25 July 2018	(Indonesia) Nerius Alom	**Perseru**	**PSIS**	Transfer	
26 July 2018	(Japan) Shohei Matsunaga	**Persela**	**PSMS**	Transfer	
27 July 2018	(Indonesia) Dendy Sulistyawan	**Bhayangkara**	**Persela**	Transfer	
27 July 2018	(Indonesia) Gian Zola	**Persib**	**Persela**	Loan	
27 July 2018	(Indonesia) Dody Alfayed	**Borneo**	Persis	Loan	
27 July 2018	(Indonesia) Valentino Telaubun	**Persija**	**Persipura**	Transfer	
28 July 2018	(Brazil) Marcel Sacramento	**Persipura**	**Barito Putera**	Transfer	
29 July 2018	(Indonesia) Muhammad Rasul	**Persija**	Kalteng Putra	Loan	
29 July 2018	(Indonesia) Riswan Yusman	**Borneo**	Persibat	Loan	
29 July 2018	(Indonesia) Zulvin Zamrun	Kalteng Putra	**Borneo**	Loan return	
30 July 2018	(Indonesia) Tegar Pangestu	PSPS Riau	Persis	Transfer	
30 July 2018	(Indonesia) Abdul Rahman Abanda	PSPS Riau	Persis	Transfer	
30 July 2018	(Indonesia) Syaiful Ramadhan	PSPS Riau	Persis	Transfer	
30 July 2018	(Indonesia) Bijahil Chalwa	**Barito Putera**	Kalteng Putra	Loan	
30 July 2018	(Indonesia) Rully Desrian	Aceh United	Martapura	Transfer	
31 July 2018	(Indonesia) Dafid Nurcahya	Persenga	PSMP	Transfer	
31 July 2018	(Indonesia) Faisal Fahri	**Barito Putera**	Perserang	Loan	
31 July 2018	(Indonesia) Basri Lohy	Aceh United	Perserang	Transfer	
31 July 2018	(Indonesia) Seftia Hadi	Aceh United	Perserang	Transfer	
31 July 2018	(Indonesia) Zikri Akbar	Aceh United	Perserang	Transfer	
31 July 2018	(Indonesia) Susanto	Persik Kendal	Cilegon United	Transfer	
31 July 2018	(Indonesia) Ervin Rianto Butar Butar	Perserang	Cilegon United	Transfer	
31 July 2018	(Indonesia) Jalwandi	Persis	Cilegon United	Transfer	
31 July 2018	(Brazil) Mazinho Santos	(Brazil) Botafogo PB	**Perseru**	Transfer	
31 July 2018	(Indonesia) Angga Saputra	**Madura United**	**PS TIRA**	Loan return	
31 July 2018	(Indonesia) Jajang Sukmara	**PSMS**	**Barito Putera**	Transfer	
1 August 2018	(Indonesia) Riski Novriansyah	Persika	Semen Padang	Transfer	
1 August 2018	(Indonesia) Yongki Aribowo	Aceh United	Perserang	Transfer	
1 August 2018	(Indonesia) Feri Aman Saragih	Kalteng Putra	Perserang	Transfer	
1 August 2018	(Indonesia) Jodi Kustiawan	**Persela**	PSS	Loan	
1 August 2018	(Iraq) Brwa Nouri	(Sweden) Östersund	**Bali United**	Transfer	
1 August 2018	(Indonesia) Muhammad Wahyu Widya Fitrianto	Persis	**PSIS**	Transfer	
1 August 2018	(Indonesia) Andre Sitepu	Persegres	Persita	Transfer	
1 August 2018	(Indonesia) Tamsil Sijaya	Persika	Persita	Transfer	
2 August 2018	(Indonesia) Kito Chandra	Persis	Persita	Transfer	
2 August 2018	(Indonesia) Rafit Ikhwanudin	**Madura United**	Cilegon United	Loan	
2 August 2018	(Indonesia) Thaufan Hidayat	PSS	Persegres	Transfer	
2 August 2018	(Indonesia) Syahrul Mustofa	Persika	Persegres	Transfer	
2 August 2018	(Indonesia) Jackson Baay	Persika	Persegres	Transfer	
2 August 2018	(Indonesia) Tedi Siamsyah	PS Timah BaBel	Persegres	Transfer	
2 August 2018	(Indonesia) Feri Eko Prastyo	Persik Kendal	Persegres	Transfer	
2 August 2018	(Indonesia) Khaniful Ilmi	Persegres Putra	Persegres	Transfer	
2 August 2018	(Indonesia) Ridlo Bachtiar	PS Timah BaBel	Persegres	Transfer	
3 August 2018	(Indonesia) Yoga Tri Septian	Cilegon United	Persita	Transfer	
3 August 2018	(Indonesia) Achmad Hisyam Tolle	PSS	**Borneo**	Transfer	
3 August 2018	(Indonesia) Aang Suparman	Persika	Persiba Balikpapan	Transfer	
3 August 2018	(Indonesia) I Gusti Rustiawan	**Persela**	**Perseru**	Transfer	
3 August 2018	(Indonesia) Dominggus Kerewai	Kalteng Putra	Semeru	Transfer	
3 August 2018	(Indonesia) Risman Maidullah	Persik Kendal	PSIM	Transfer	
3 August 2018	(Indonesia) Fikri Ardiansyah	**PS TIRA**	Persik Kendal	Transfer	
3 August 2018	(Indonesia) Ramadhan	**PSMS**	Persik Kendal	Transfer	
3 August 2018	(Indonesia) Try Hamdani Goentara	**Persipura**	PSS	Transfer	
4 August 2018	(Indonesia) Tedi Heri Setiawan	**Arema**	Martapura	Transfer	
4 August 2018	(Indonesia) Muhammad Sidik Saimima	**Persebaya**	**Perseru**	Transfer	
4 August 2018	(Indonesia) Irsyad Habib	Persiraja	Aceh United	Transfer	
4 August 2018	(Indonesia) Ponda Dwi Saputra	PSPS Riau	Persiraja	Transfer	
4 August 2018	(Indonesia) Zamrony	PSPS Riau	Persiraja	Transfer	
4 August 2018	(Indonesia) Slamet Sampurno	Persik Kediri	Semeru	Transfer	
4 August 2018	(Indonesia) Andika Kurniawan	PSPS Riau	Persiraja	Transfer	
4 August 2018	(Indonesia) M. Sulthon Fajar	Persibo	PSIM	Transfer	
4 August 2018	(Indonesia) Andri Abubakar	PSPS Riau	Persiraja	Transfer	
4 August 2018	(Indonesia) Fani Aulia	Persiraja	Aceh United	Transfer	
4 August 2018	(Indonesia) Muhammad Renngur	PSPS Riau	Persiraja	Transfer	
4 August 2018	(Indonesia) Rizky Yusuf Nasution	Persika	Persiraja	Transfer	
4 August 2018	(Indonesia) Husnuzhon	Persika	Persiraja	Transfer	
4 August 2018	(Indonesia) Dimas Galih	Persiba Balikpapan	Persik Kendal	Transfer	
5 August 2018	(Indonesia) Hapidin	Persiraja	Persibat	Transfer	
5 August 2018	(Indonesia) Haris Hardiansyah	Persika	Martapura	Transfer	
5 August 2018	(Indonesia) Alba Saves Krey	**Perseru**	Martapura	Transfer	
5 August 2018	(Indonesia) Lukas Mandowen	**Perseru**	Aceh United	Transfer	
5 August 2018	(Indonesia) Robert Elopere	Persiwa	Aceh United	Transfer	
5 August 2018	(Indonesia) Ziko Sukmana	Persibo	**Perseru**	Transfer	
5 August 2018	(Indonesia) Revi Agung Wibawa	Persegres	Martapura	Transfer	
5 August 2018	(Indonesia) Reza Saputra	Persika	Martapura	Transfer	
5 August 2018	(Indonesia) Ikhfanul Alam	Persiba Balikpapan	PSIR	Transfer	
5 August 2018	(Indonesia) Purwa Putra	Persiwa	Persika	Transfer	
5 August 2018	(Indonesia) Fajar Romansyah	Persibat	Persika	Transfer	
5 August 2018	(Indonesia) Sandi Pratama	Persika	Martapura	Transfer	
5 August 2018	(Indonesia) Dhika Pratama Putra	**Mitra Kukar**	Martapura	Loan	
5 August 2018	(Indonesia) Joko Sidik Fitrayono	**Mitra Kukar**	Martapura	Loan	
5 August 2018	(Indonesia) Monieaga Bagus Suwandi	**Mitra Kukar**	Martapura	Loan	
6 August 2018	(Indonesia) Faris Aditama	Martapura	Madura	Transfer	
6 August 2018	(Indonesia) Rian Miziar	Martapura	PSS	Transfer	
6 August 2018	(Indonesia) Muhamad Irwan Cacomba	Persik Kendal	Cilegon United	Transfer	
6 August 2018	(Indonesia) Nunung Dwi Cahyo	Persegres	Cilegon United	Transfer	
7 August 2018	(Indonesia) Reky Rahayu	**Persebaya**	Persika	Transfer	
