= Hery =

Hery or Héry may refer to:

== People ==
- Hery Prasetyo (born 1985), Indonesian footballer
- Hery Setaharinaivomanjato Raharisaina, Malagasy politician
- Hery Rajaonarimampianina (born 1958), Malagasy politician, President of Madagascar from 2014 to 2018
- Hery (Ancient Egyptian), Ancient Egyptian official - see TT12
- Bastien Héry (born 1992), Malagasy footballer
- Franck Héry (born 1993), French footballer
- Louis Héry (fabulist) (1801–1856), French fabulist, translator into Creole of some of La Fontaine's fables
- Louis Héry (driver) (died 1956), French race car driver - see List of driver deaths in motorsport
- Luc Héry (born 1961), French classical violinist

== Places ==
- Héry, Nièvre, France, a commune
- Héry, Yonne, France, a commune

== See also ==
- French communes:
  - Héry-sur-Alby, Haute-Savoie department
  - Dompierre-sur-Héry, Nièvre department
  - Pont-d'Héry, Jura department
  - Villard-d'Héry, Savoie department
- Herry (disambiguation)
