= Iner =

Iner or INER may refer to:

- Institute of Nuclear Energy Research, or INER
- Iner Souster, musician
- Iner Sontany Putra, footballer
