= Herry =

Herry may refer to:

== People ==
- Herry Iman Pierngadi (born 1962), Indonesian badminton coach
- Herry Janto Setiawan (born 1973), Indonesian cyclist
- Herry Kiswanto (born 1955), Indonesian football manager and player
- Herry Saliku Biembe (born 1981), Congolese boxer
- Herry Susilo (born 1988), Indonesian football player
- Jeanne Herry (born 1978), French filmmaker and actress

== Places ==
- Herry, Cher, Centre-Val de Loire, France

== Other ==
- Herry Hercules, character in Class of the Titans
- Herry Monster, character in Sesame Street

== See also ==
- Hery (disambiguation)
