= Leuser Ecosystem =

Area of forest on the island of Sumatra in Indonesia

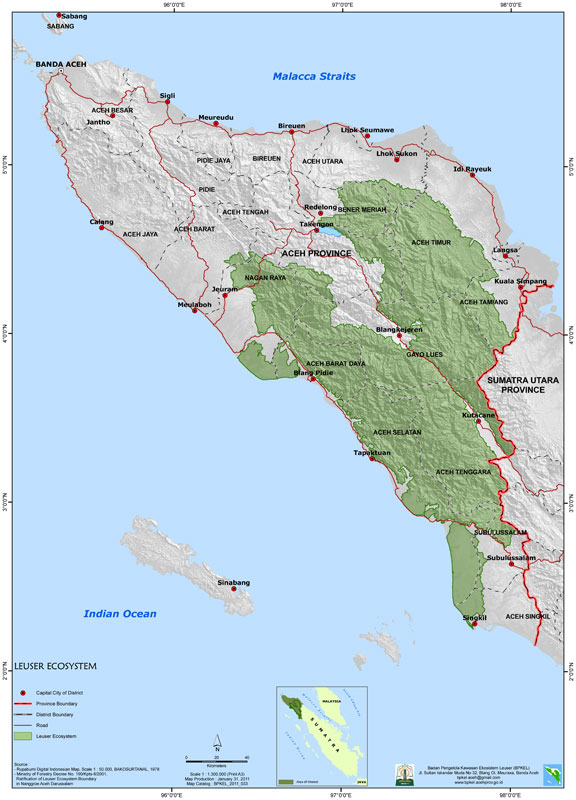
Leuser Ecosystem, Aceh

The Leuser Ecosystem is an area of forest located in the provinces of Aceh and North Sumatra on the island of Sumatra in Indonesia. Covering more than 2.6 million hectares it is one of the richest expanses of tropical rain forest in Southeast Asia and is the last place on earth where the Sumatran elephant, rhino, tiger and orangutan are found within one area. It has one of the world's richest yet least-known forest systems, and its vegetation is an important source of Earth's oxygen. Leuser also possesses more lowland rainforest than the rest of Sumatra combined and supports some of the last viable populations of tiger, rhino, orangutan and elephant. These, and many co-occurring species, are severely threatened by habitat destruction and poaching.

== Geography ==
The ecosystem stretches from the coast of the Indian Ocean to the Malacca Straits. It encompasses two vast mountain ranges including Mount Leuser that reaches 3455m, two major volcanoes, three lakes and more than nine major river systems. As well as providing habitats for a number of endangered wildlife species, the ecosystem acts as a life support for approximately four million people who live around it by providing a steady supply of water, soil fertility, flood control, climate regulation and pest mitigation.

== Ecology ==
The ecosystem is home to the largest remaining populations of the Sumatran tiger, Sumatran elephant, Sumatran rhino and the Sumatran orangutan. Tiger densities in provincially protected lower-elevation forests of the ecosystem reached 2.35 individuals per 100 km^{2} (39 sq mi), among the highest anywhere in Sumatra. There are at least 130 species of mammals within the ecosystem which means that one in 32 of the world's mammals are found there, or one quarter of Indonesia's mammals. Primates residing within the ecosystem include the white-handed gibbon, the siamang, macaques, the loris and the lutung. Leuser is home to as many as seven species of cats including the clouded leopard, the Asian golden cat, and the spotted linsang. The sun bear is quite common within the boundaries of the ecosystem.

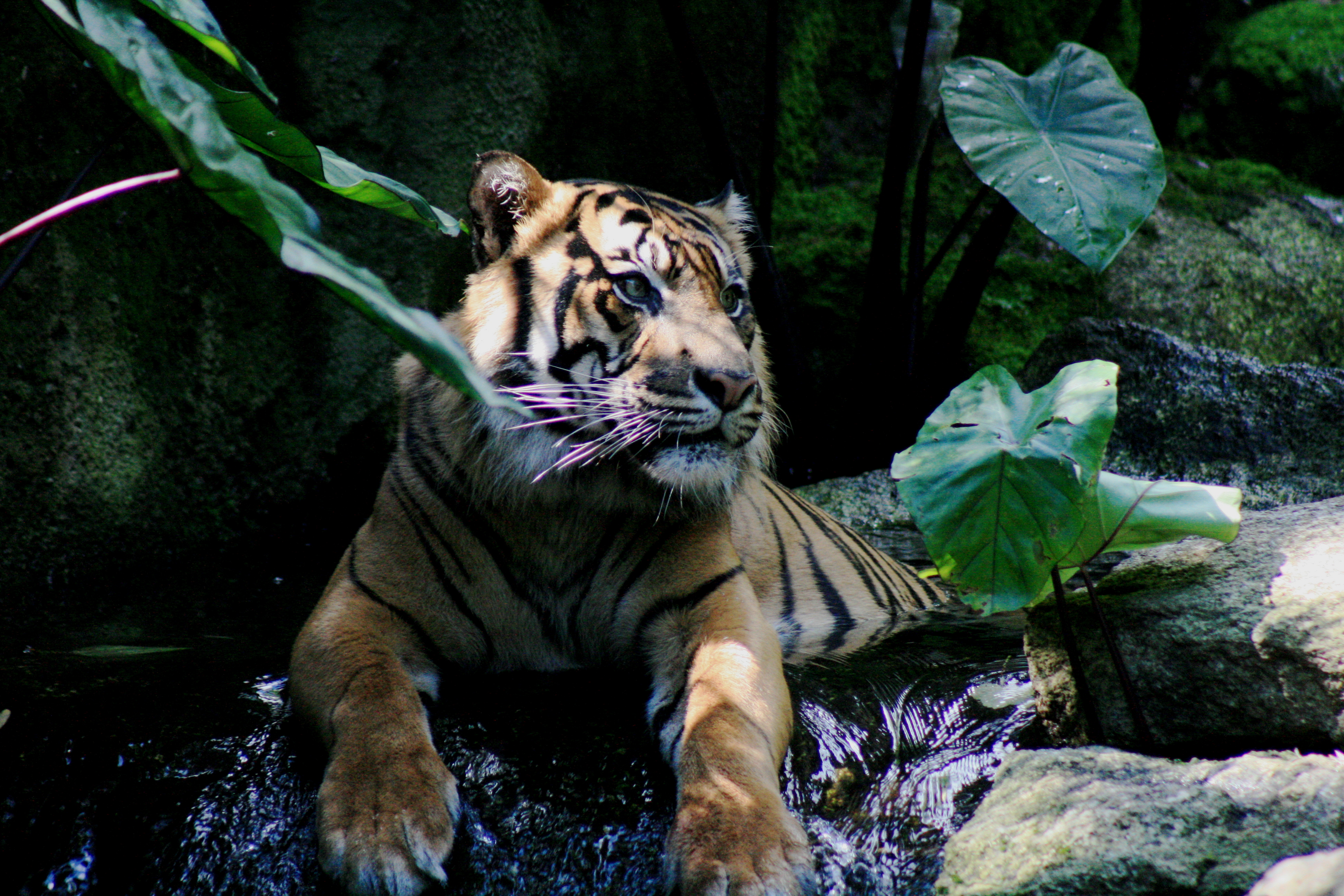
Sumatran tiger

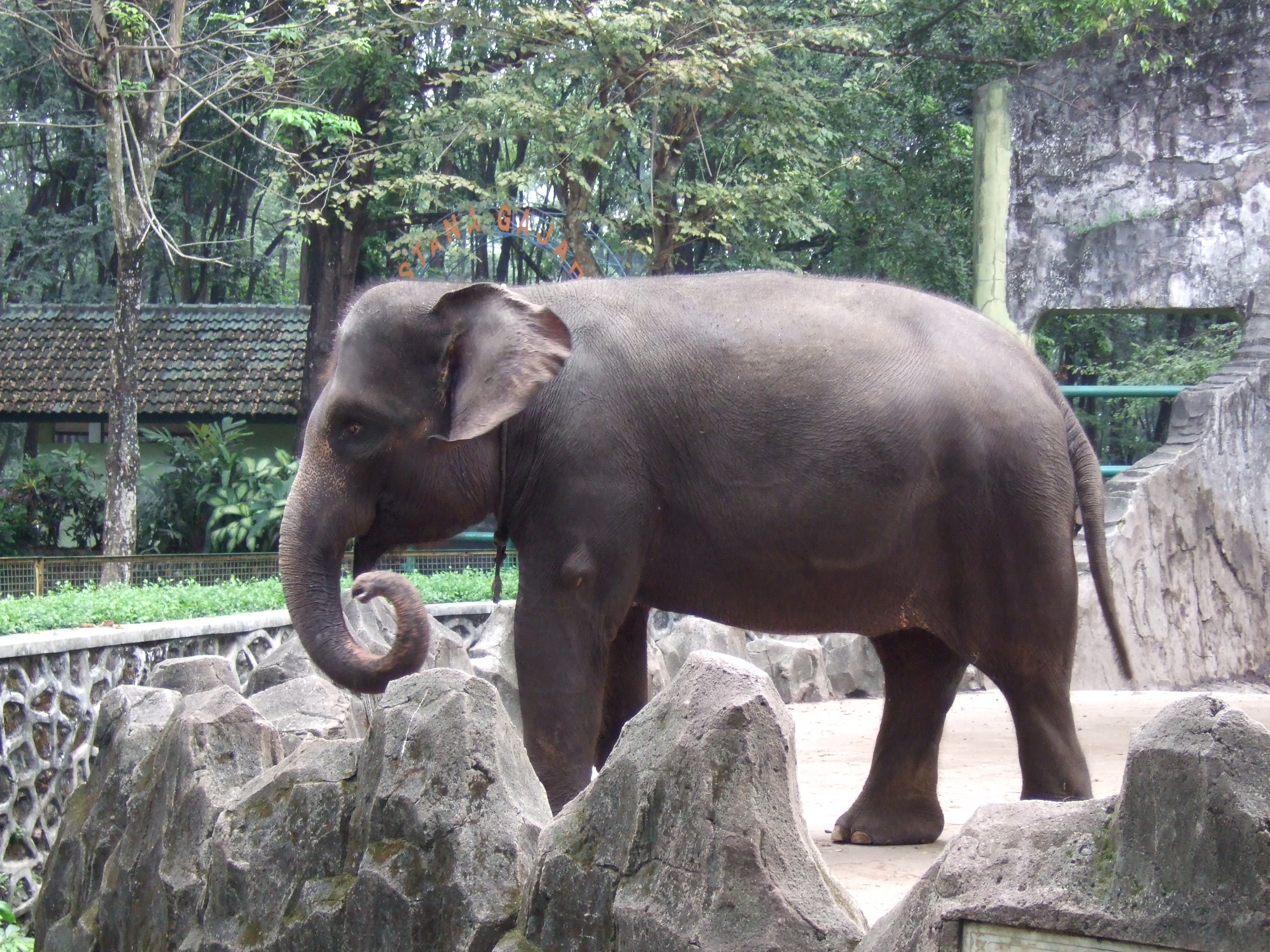
Sumatran elephant

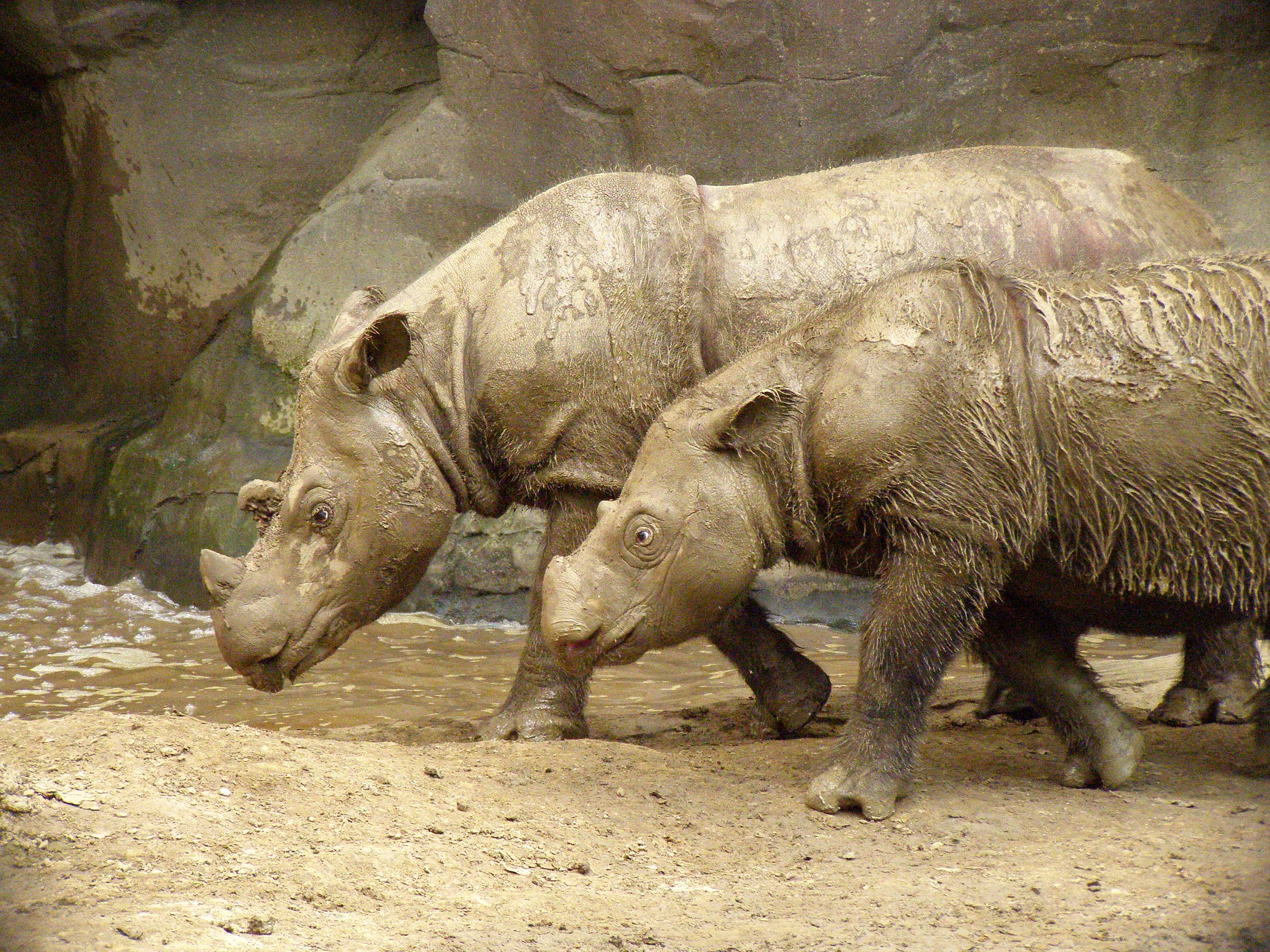
Sumatran rhino

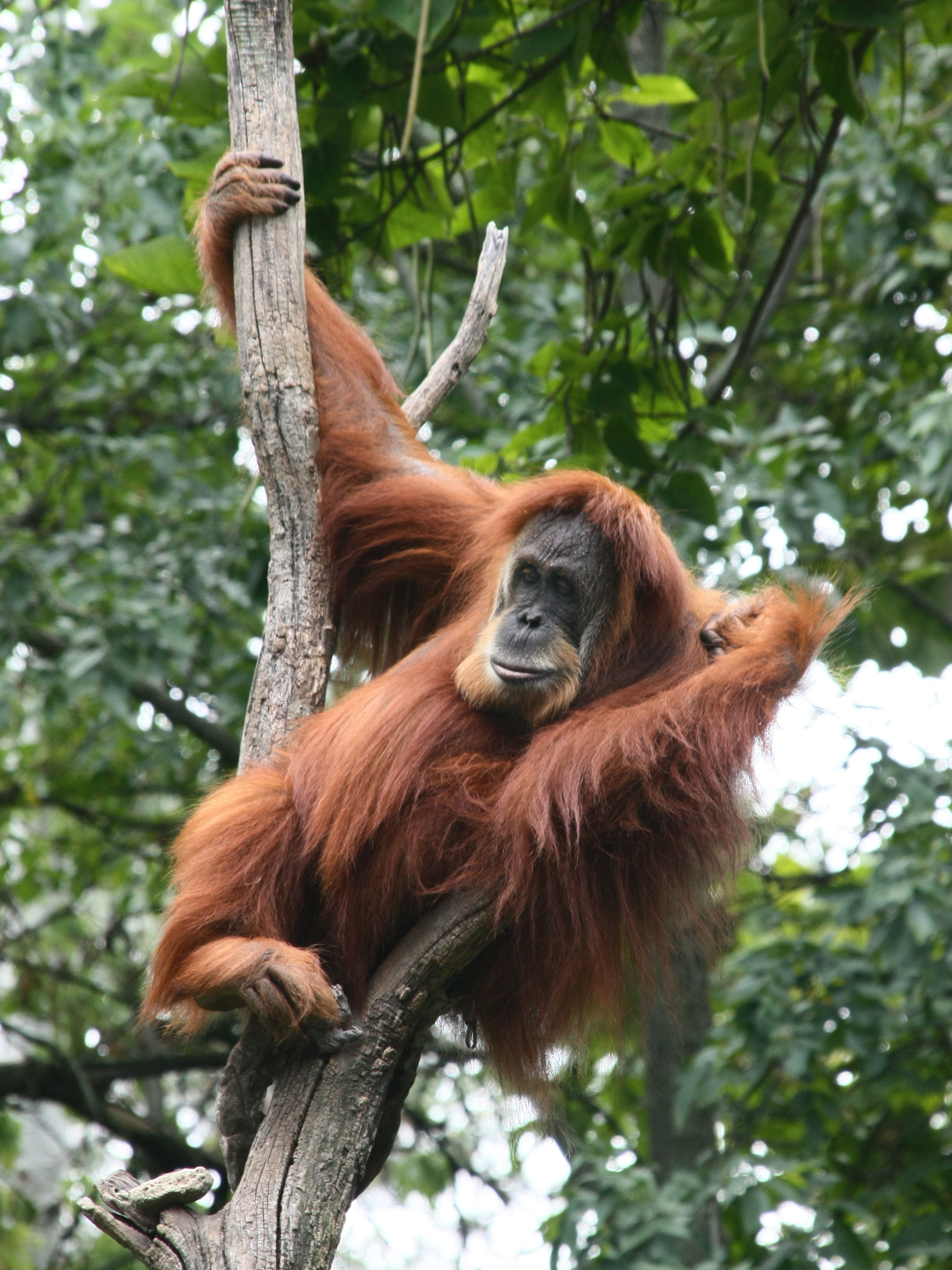
Sumatran orangutan

The most common herbivores found in Leuser are the deer which include the sambar, the muntjac and the mouse deer. Among the largest reptiles found in Leuser are the turtles and tortoises. The most venomous are the snakes which include the king cobra and pythons that can reach up to ten meters in length. Monitor lizards, skinks, geckos and a variety of frogs are also common. At least 325 species of birds have been recorded in the ecosystem with at least eight species endemic to Sumatra. This rich diversity of bird species includes: bee-eaters, flycatchers, flowerpeckers, honeyguides, kingfishers, spiderhunters, woodpeckers, barbets, babblers, broadbills, bulbul, drongos, hornbills, magpies, minvets, myna, orioles, robins, shamas, shrikes, swallows, swifts, thrushes, treepies, trogons, warblers, weavers, whistlers, white-eyes, leafbirds, sunbirds, tailorbirds, fantail, forktails, needletails, wagtails, doves, pigeons, quails, partridges, pheasants, cuckoos, parakeets, parrots, bitterns, herons, finfoots, ducks, snipes, sandpipers, waders, falcons, hawks, nightjars, owls, serpent eagles, hawk eagles, fish eagles, sea eagles, and many more.

The Leuser Ecosystem comprises one of the remaining examples of Indo-Malayan (Malesian) vegetation communities, with an estimated 45% of the approximately 10,000 recorded plant species. In general the ecosystem can be characterised as a montane rainforest community. However, the typical vegetation type up to an altitude of 600 metres is moist tropical lowland forest characterised by multi-layered stories with emergent trees reaching between 45 and 60 metres in height and high densities of fruit tree species. The large variety of tree species found in Leuser represent virtually all life-strategies of trees, from root flowering and trunk flowering to common twig flowering types. Among the most important and impressive trees are the several species of strangling fig. The largest flower on earth; the parasitic Rafflesia is a relatively common in the ecosystem.

== Recent history ==
As a result of the peace agreement between the Free Aceh Movement (GAM) and the central government of Indonesia, Aceh was awarded a significant level of autonomy over its natural resources, including the right to govern the Leuser Ecosystem. Irwandi Yusuf, the current Governor of Aceh, established Badan Pengelola Kawasan Ekosistem Leuser (BPKEL) to govern the Leuser Ecosystem and coordinate wildlife management in Aceh. The local Aceh government has introduced a land development plan that would open up an estimated 1.2 million hectares of the forest reserve’s 2.6 million hectares to mining, logging, and agriculture.

A group of Aceh citizens has decided to sue the Home Ministry.

=== Leuser As a National Strategic Area ===
Act No.26/2007 on Spatial Planning has designated important conservation and areas of high biodiversity as National Strategic Areas. One such area is the Gunung Leuser National Park and the broader Leuser Ecosystem. The area provides water to nearly 4 million people living in Aceh and it is of global importance to the conservation of biodiversity, as well as an important status symbol of Aceh. Conservationist applauds the national governments tough stance on criminal activities in the National Strategic Areas such as Leuser; Act No.26/2007 allow criminal charges to be brought against not only those who carry out illegal activities in the area, but also to those who give permission allowing criminal activities to take place. This is an important milestone, and stand to deter corrupt officials from ‘selling’ permits to conduct activities could damage this sensitive ecosystem. National Spatial Planning Law ruled maximum sentence of 5 years imprisonment and Rp 500 million fine. The Aceh administration did not mention the KEL’s status as a national strategic area in its land use plan issued through Qanun (Islamic bylaw) No. 19/2013.

== Threats ==
=== Roads ===
One of the biggest threats to the Leuser Ecosystem is the building of road networks through the forest. The expansion of roads and settlements into this area lead to increased deforestation and allows illegal logging and poaching to be undertaken with greater ease. A proposed road network known as "Ladia Galaska" that would connect the east and west coasts of Aceh and cut through the Leuser Ecosystem in at least nine places would have a devastating effect on the area's animals, many species of which do not cross roads. The plans for the proposed road comprise 450 km (280 mi) of main road plus more than 1,200 km (750 mi) of minor roads, the majority of which would lie within the boundaries of the Leuser Ecosystem.

=== Palm oil plantations ===
Also a major threat are palm oil plantations, particularly in an area on the west coast of Aceh known as Tripa. Palm oil plantations in this area are primarily located on peat swamps up to three metres deep. Between 50 and 100 million tonnes of carbon is stored in the peat swamps, and is released into the atmosphere as carbon dioxide when the peat is burned. Palm oil plantations clear primary forest and burn the peat swamps in order to construct large canals to facilitate the planting of palm oil. The land degradation caused by palm oil plantations in Tripa compromises the welfare of local communities and destroys the habitats of a number of charismatic animal species, including the highest density of orangutans found anywhere in the world. Despite a two-year moratorium on forest clearance, Governor Irwardi Yusuf issued an official permit to oil palm corporation PT Kallista Alam to cut-and-burn the Tripa peat swamp forest, endangering many rare species.

These actions have spurred an international movement to save Tripa. Conservation groups have aligned together in an international campaign that has resulted in historic cancellation of palm oil plantation permits. This sets a legal precedent for saving critically endangered orangutan habitat.

== See also ==
- List of ecoregions in Indonesia
- Rudi Putra
