= Eki Nurhakim =

Indonesian footballer

Personal information
- Full name: Eki Nurhakim
- Date of birth: 3 September 1983 (age 43)
- Place of birth: Bandung, Indonesia
- Height: 1.72 m (5 ft 7 1/2 in)
- Position: Striker

Youth career
- 2001: Persikabo Bogor

Senior career*
Years	Team	Apps	(Gls)
2001–2005	Persikabo Bogor	37	(8)
2005–2007	Pelita Jaya	26	(4)
2007–2009	Sriwijaya	15	(2)
2009–2010	Persijap Jepara	18	(9)
2010–2013	Persiba Balikpapan	50	(5)
2014	Persikabo Bogor	11	(0)
2015	Persela Lamongan	0	(0)
2016–2017	Persibat Batang	25	(4)
2018	Kalteng Putra	18	(3)
2019	Persatu Tuban	8	(0)
- * Club domestic league appearances and goals as of 5 January 2019

Eki Nurhakim (born September 3, 1983 in Bandung) is an Indonesian former professional footballer who plays as a striker.

== Club career statistics ==
As of 5 January 2013.

Club performance			League		Cup		League Cup		Total	
Season	Club	League	Apps	Goals	Apps	Goals	Apps	Goals	Apps	Goals
Indonesia			League		Piala Indonesia		League Cup		Total	
2002	Persikabo Bogor	First Division	?	?	-		-		?	?
2003	Persikabo Bogor	Second Division	?	?	-		-		?	?
2004	Persikabo Bogor	Second Division	?	4	-		-		?	4
2005	Persikabo Bogor	First Division	?	1	?	3	-		?	4
2006	Pelita Jaya	First Division	?	3	?	2	-		?	5
2007–08	Sriwijaya	Premier Division	11	1	2	1	-		13	2
2008–09	Sriwijaya	Super League	3	0	0	0	-		3	0
2009–10	Persijap Jepara	Super League	18	9	0	0	-		18	9
2010–11	Persiba Balikpapan	Super League	22	4	-		-		22	4
2011–12	Persiba Balikpapan	Super League	20	1	-		-		20	1
2013	Persiba Balikpapan	Super League	1	0	0	0	-		1	0
Total	Indonesia		75	23	2	6	-		77	29
Career total			75	23	2	6	-		77	29

== Honours ==
=== Club honors ===
Sriwijaya

- Liga Indonesia (1): 2007–08
- Copa Indonesia (2): 2007–08, 2008–09
