= Indra Gunawan (footballer) =

Indonesian footballer

Personal information
- Full name: Indra Gunawan
- Date of birth: 12 October 1982 (age 44)
- Place of birth: Indonesia
- Height: 1.75 m (5 ft 9 in)
- Position: Midfielder

Senior career*
Years	Team	Apps	(Gls)
2008–2009	Persibat Batang	31	(1)
2009–2010	PSAP Sigli	13	(1)
2010–2011	PSIM Yogyakarta	27	(1)
2011–2013	PSAP Sigli	34	(0)
- * Club domestic league appearances and goals as of 11 July 2012

Indra Gunawan (born October 12, 1982) is an Indonesian former footballer.

== Club statistics ==
Club	Season	Super League		Premier Division		Piala Indonesia		Total	
Club	Season	Apps	Goals	Apps	Goals	Apps	Goals	Apps	Goals
PSAP Sigli	2011-12	16	0	-		-		16	0
Total		16	0	-		-		16	0
