= Ruud Gullit (Indonesian footballer) =

Indonesian footballer

Personal information
- Full name: Ruud Gullit Sagaf Yunus
- Date of birth: 9 December 1992 (age 33)
- Place of birth: Ternate, Indonesia
- Height: 1.70 m (5 ft 7 in)
- Position: Midfielder

Senior career*
| Years | Team | Apps | (Gls) |
| 2013–2014 | Martapura | 27 | (4) |
| 2014–2015 | PSMS Medan | 15 | (0) |
| 2015 | Martapura | 11 | (0) |
| 2016–2017 | Persikutim East Kutai | 19 | (0) |
| 2017–2018 | PSIS Semarang | 10 | (0) |
| 2018–2019 | PSPS Riau | 19 | (3) |
| 2019–2020 | Persibat Batang | 21 | (1) |
- * Club domestic league appearances and goals

Ruud Gullit Sagaf Yunus (born 9 December 1992) is an Indonesian footballer who plays as a midfielder.

== Career ==
=== Martapura FC ===
Ruud Gullit started his professional football career at Liga Indonesia First Division side Martapura FC in 2013. He helped Martapura FC promote to Liga Indonesia Premier Division. Having time to join PSMS Medan in 2014 season, he move back to Martapura FC on 2015 season.

=== PSIS Semarang ===
He made his competitive debut on 11 May 2017 in a Liga 2 clash versus PSIR Rembang. He helped the club promote to Liga 1 in December 2017 after winning 6–4 over his ex-club Martapura FC. Shortly after that match, His contract was extended to 2019.

== Personal life ==
Gullit's father idolized Dutch Ruud Gullit and even chose Ruud Gullit's name as a prayer so that later on, his son could be as same as the Dutch football legend. Gullit is also the only one in the family who pursue a career as a footballer. Gullit's two older brothers were named 'standard' by his father, Zulkifli and Muhammad Irfan. According to Gullit, his name was originally a burden, because it always attracted people's attention. However, over time, Gullit realized that the name is his father's prayer every time he appeared on the football pitch.

== Typical ==
According to the coach of Subangkit, Ruud Gullit has a breaker role and could be an alternative when the defensive midfielder players Ahmad Agung and Saddam Sudarma was absent.
