= Komarodin =

Indonesian footballer

Personal information
- Full name: Komarodin
- Date of birth: 19 July 1995 (age 31)
- Place of birth: Kendal, Indonesia
- Height: 1.67 m (5 ft 6 in)
- Position: Winger

Youth career
- 2014–2015: SSA Salatiga
- 2015: Lipio Unnes

Senior career*
Years	Team	Apps	(Gls)
2015	Persik Kendal	13	(0)
2016–2017	Gresik United	27	(3)
2018–2022	PSIS Semarang	79	(3)
2022	PSS Sleman	7	(0)
2023–2024	Persikabo 1973	24	(1)
2023–2024	→ Persekat Tegal (loan)	7	(1)
2025	Persipal Palu	2	(0)
2025	Persipa Pati	4	(1)
- * Club domestic league appearances and goals as of 25 February 2025

Komarodin (born 19 July 1995) is an Indonesian professional footballer who plays as a winger.

== Club career ==
=== Gresik United ===
Komarodin signed with Gresik United in 2016. He scored his first Liga 1 goal in a 2–1 victory against Persiba Balikpapan.

=== PSIS Semarang ===
Komarodin move to PSIS Semarang in December 2017. He made his debut on 25 March 2018 against PSM Makassar. On 22 July, Komarodin scored his first goal for PSIS against Persebaya Surabaya.

Komarodin scored his first goal of the 2019 season on 22 November 2019, in an 2–1 win game against TIRA-Persikabo. He scored against Arema on 8 December.

Komarodin appeared in total 88 matches for PSIS Semarang over four seasons, contributing five goals and six assists.

=== PSS Sleman ===
Komarodin signed for Liga 1 side PSS Sleman in 2022. He made his league debut on 23 July against PSM Makassar. He officially left PSS after half a season, appearing only seven times for the club.

== Career statistics ==
=== Club ===
As of 25 February 2025

Club	Season	League			Cup		Continental		Other		Total	
Club	Season	Division	Apps	Goals	Apps	Goals	Apps	Goals	Apps	Goals	Apps	Goals
Gresik United	2017	Liga 1	27	3	0	0	–		0	0	27	3
PSIS Semarang	2018	Liga 1	29	1	0	0	–		0	0	29	1
PSIS Semarang	2019	Liga 1	21	2	0	0	–		0	0	21	2
PSIS Semarang	2020	Liga 1	3	0	0	0	–		0	0	3	0
PSIS Semarang	2021–22	Liga 1	26	0	0	0	–		4 (Note: Appearances in Menpora Cup)	2	30	2
PSIS Semarang	Total		107	6	0	0	–		4	2	111	8
PSS Sleman	2022–23	Liga 1	7	0	0	0	–		5 (Note: Appearances in Indonesia President's Cup)	0	12	0
Persikabo 1973	2022–23	Liga 1	12	1	0	0	–		0	0	12	1
Persikabo 1973	2023–24	Liga 1	12	0	0	0	–		0	0	12	0
Persekat Tegal (loan)	2023–24	Liga 2	7	1	0	0	–		0	0	7	1
Persipal Palu	2024–25	Liga 2	2	0	0	0	–		0	0	2	0
Persipa Pati	2024–25	Liga 2	4	1	0	0	–		0	0	4	1
Career total			150	9	0	0	–		9	2	159	11
