= Rudi Putra =

Indonesian biologist

- Born: Rudi Putra; Indonesia
- Occupations: biologist, environmentalists
- Awards: Goldman Environmental Prize

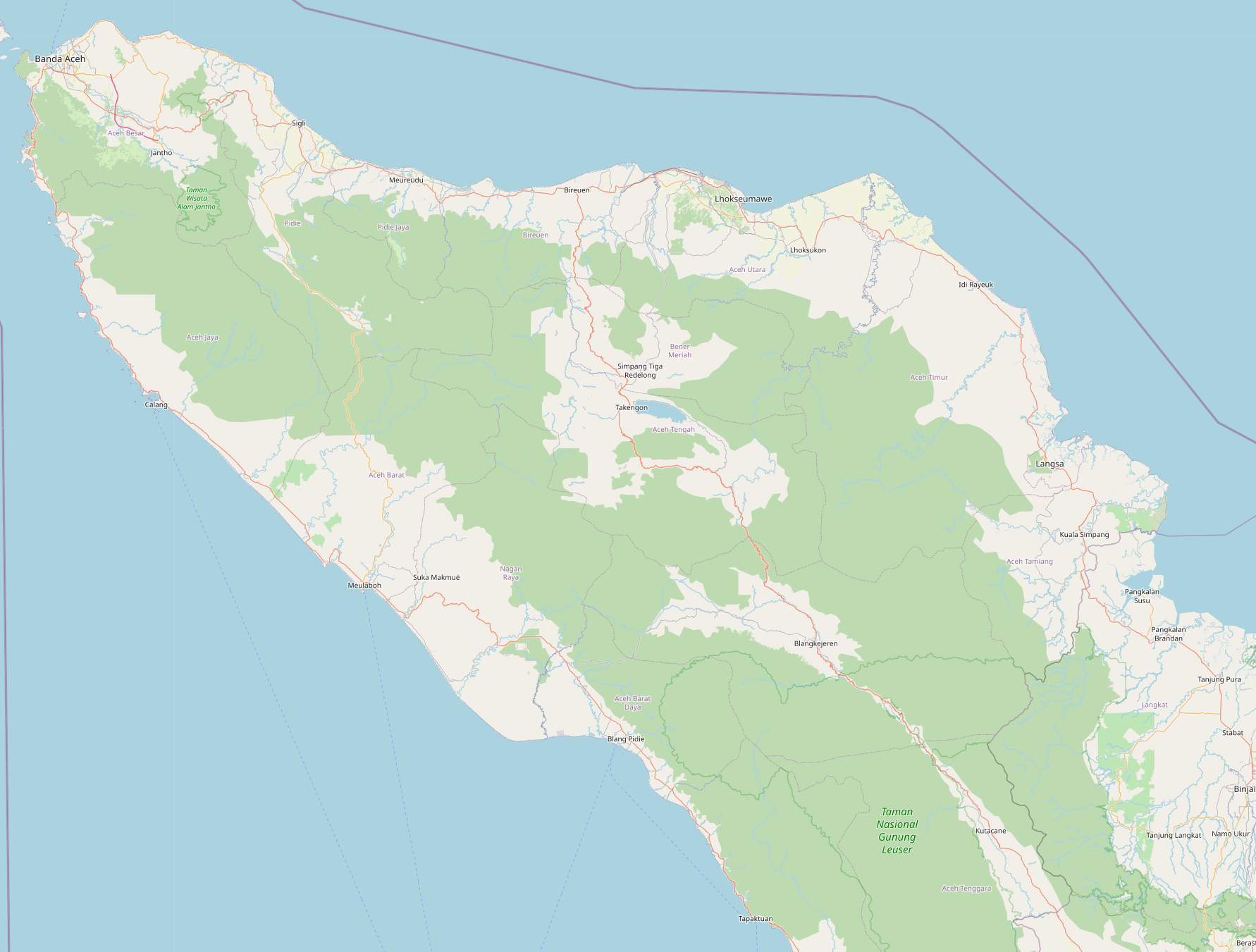
Location map Indonesia Aceh

Rudi Putra is an Indonesian biologist who received a Goldman Environmental Prize in 2014 for his efforts to combat illegal logging, forest encroachment for palm oil production, and policies that open endangered ecosystems to mining and plantation industries.

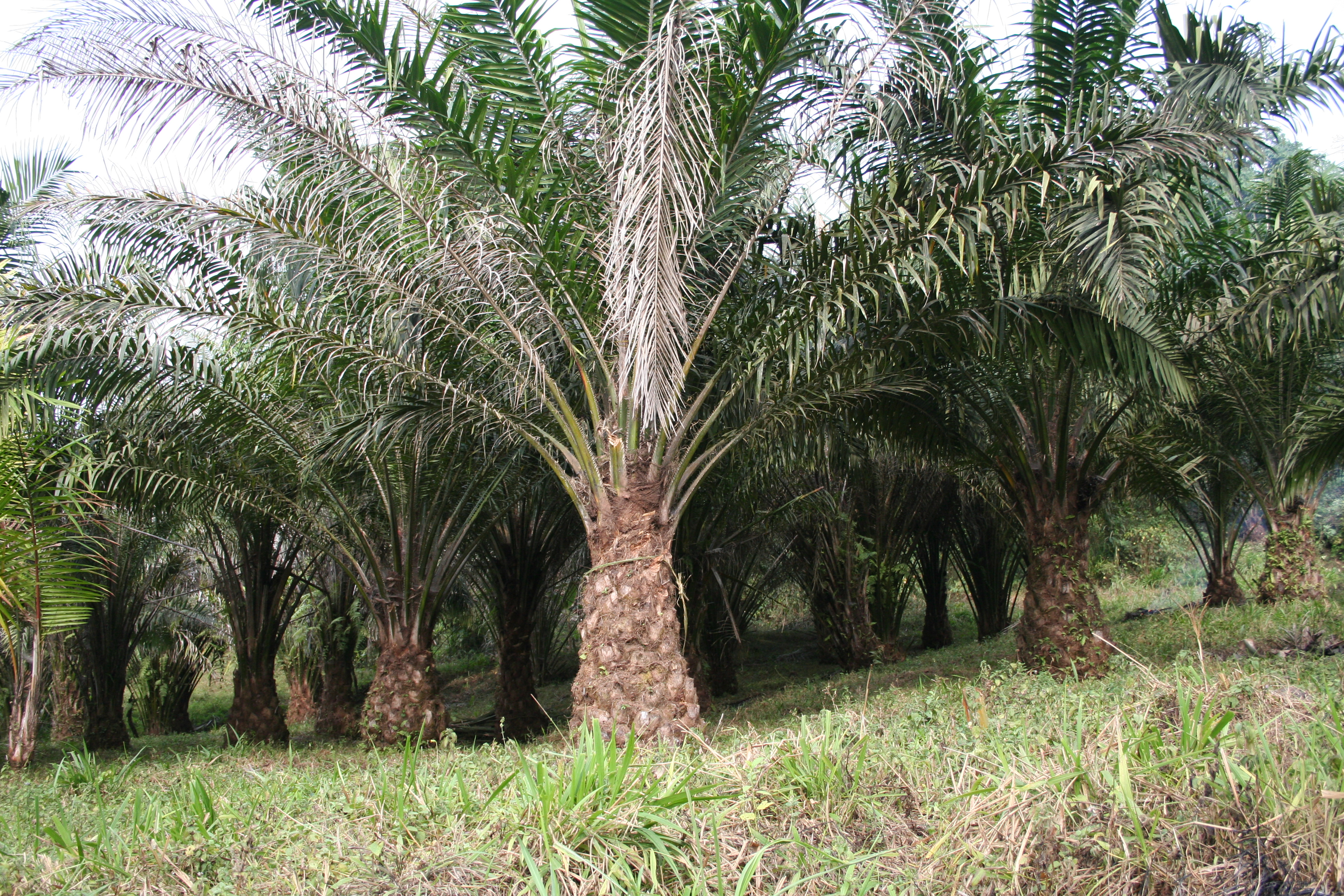
Oil palm

Putra is a biologist who worked in Aceh Province, and who received a prize of $175,000 from his winning of the Goldman Environmental Prize in 2014. Putra was selected as the winner in the category 'Island and Island Nations'. He was recognized for his campaign to reclaim the land under illegal palm oil plantations in the Leuser Ecosystem, Sumatra, and to clear them in order to re-establish habitat for endangered orangutans, tigers, rhinoceros, and elephants, as well as lobbying against political plans to remove protected status from Aceh's primary forests. In 2013, these activities culminated in the establishment of a petition that asked the Indonesian government to enforce conservation law and reject the proposals in Aceh. The petition received more than 1.4 million signatures, increasing awareness of environmental issues in Indonesia and attracting widespread international condemnation.

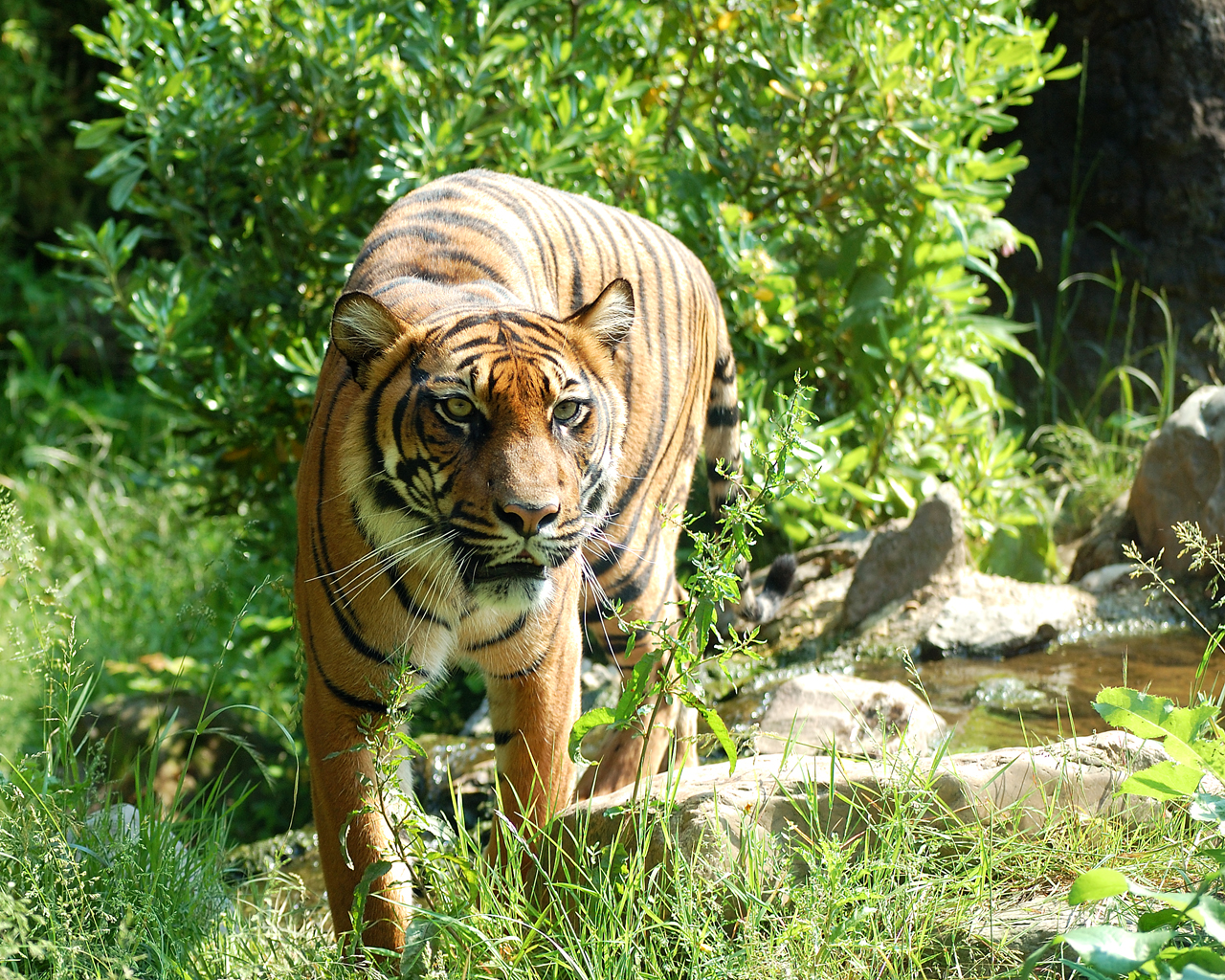
Sumatran Tiger

== Motivation ==
As a high school student who grew up in the region of Aceh, Putra showed a keen interest in the natural world. He studied the biology and conservation of the Sumatran rhino: the smallest member of the most endangered rhinoceros in the family.

Putra become an expert researcher and also a tracker, who led an expedition aiming to protects rhinoceros in the field by pursuing and catching poachers in the Leuser Ecosystem. The area, which has an area of 6.4 million hectares of forest stretching from Aceh to North Sumatra, is federally protected and is one of the largest remaining habitats supporting the Sumatran rhino.

Putra realised that in addition to attempting to stop illegal hunting, his efforts would not be complete without discussing and confronting the threat posed by habitat destruction from illegal logging and palm oil plantations. Further studies show the importance of forests for the 4 million people living close to the Leuser Ecosystem. Forests also provide protection from flooding; in the Leuser ecosystem the frequency and severity has been increasing. Putra sees it as his job not only to protect the rhinos and their habitat, but also the people of the region.

== Illegal palm oil plantations ==
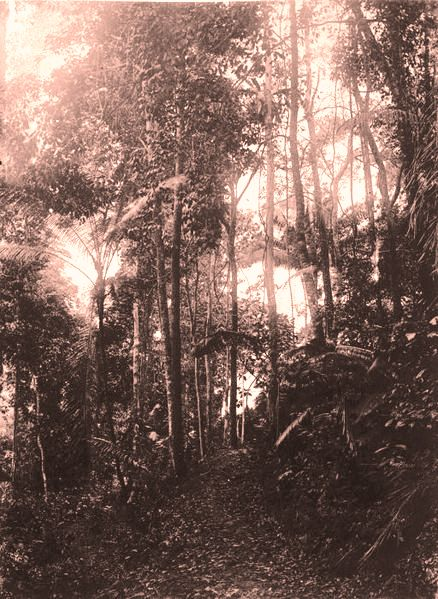
Forest path in Atjeh

In the course of rescuing the land from the 'oilers' and enabling the natural ecosystems to regain their hold, Putra's approach was soundly based on grassroots innovations rather than direct lobbying of local government. This approach involved supporting a programme of local community education about the problem and how the scale of illegal logging threatens the lives not only of animals but also the people of Aceh. Putra created a chain of support from members of the community which started and gradually increased to include members of the government and police service. Currently, Putra oversees the recovery team that cut down the forest of palm trees in the Leuser Ecosystem. To this day, Putra has managed to reduce 26 illegal oil palm plantations. Twenty-four of these were closed willingly by the owners, whilst the other two were forcibly closed after a police operation following legal action.

== FKL ==
Rudi and his colleagues founded Forum Konservasi Leuser (FKL) in 2013, which operates 28 teams to protect the leuser ecosystem by dismantling snares and restoring damaged forest. Most of the forest is restored naturally rather than through tree planting. Some 5,000 ha have been restored in this way as of 2021.

== Awards ==
Environmental activists from six regions of the world received an award as part of the Goldman Environmental Prize in San Francisco on 28 April 2014. Each year the award is worth a $175,000 award for the individuals who have shown huge courage and initiative against the odds to take action to protect their environment.

The six winners in 2014 were Desmond D'Sa is from South Africa, Suren Gazaryan from Russia, Ramesh Agrawal from India, Ruth Buendia from Peru, Helen Slottje from America, and Putra Son representing Indonesia.

In 2013 Rudy won the Future For Nature Award, worth €50,000 for individuals passionate about nature conservation.

== See also ==
- Environmental activists
- Leuser Ecosystem
- Sumatran Rhino
