= Gustur Cahyo =

Indonesian professional footballer

Personal information
- Full name: Gustur Cahyo Putro
- Date of birth: 11 January 1997 (age 29)
- Place of birth: Magelang, Indonesia
- Height: 1.70 m (5 ft 7 in)
- Position: Right-back

Team information
- Current team: Barito Putera

Youth career
- 2015: PPSM Magelang
- 2016: PS TNI

Senior career*
Years	Team	Apps	(Gls)
2017–2018	PS TNI	23	(2)
2018	PSIS Semarang	8	(0)
2019	PSCS Cilacap	11	(3)
2020–2021	Persikabo 1973	2	(0)
2022	Bekasi City	2	(0)
2023–2024	Persipa Pati	15	(0)
2024–2025	PSMS Medan	10	(0)
2026	PSIS Semarang	10	(0)
2026–	Barito Putera	0	(0)
- * Club domestic league appearances and goals as of 3 May 2026

Gustur Cahyo Putro (born 11 January 1997) is an Indonesian professional footballer who plays as a right-back for Championship club Barito Putera.

== Club career ==
=== PPSM Magelang ===
Gustur started his football career with PPSM Magelang.

=== PS TNI ===
He made his professionally debut in the Liga 1 on 17 April 2017 who he scored one goal against Borneo.

=== Bekasi City ===
On 7 June 2022, it was announced that Gustur would be joining Bekasi City for the 2022-23 Liga 2 campaign.

== Career statistics ==
=== Club ===
As of 3 May 2026

Club	Season	League			Cup		Continental		Other (Note: Appearances in Indonesia President's Cup)		Total	
Club	Season	Division	Apps	Goals	Apps	Goals	Apps	Goals	Apps	Goals	Apps	Goals
PS TNI	2017	Liga 1	23	2	0	0	—		0	0	23	2
PSIS Semarang	2018	Liga 1	8	0	0	0	—		2	0	10	0
PSCS Cilacap	2019	Liga 2	11	3	0	0	—		0	0	11	3
Persikabo 1973	2020	Liga 1	0	0	0	0	—		0	0	0	0
Persikabo 1973	2021	Liga 1	2	0	0	0	—		0	0	2	0
Bekasi City	2021–22	Liga 2	2	0	0	0	—		0	0	2	0
Persipa Pati	2023–24	Liga 2	15	0	0	0	—		0	0	15	0
PSMS Medan	2023–24	Liga 2	10	0	0	0	—		0	0	10	0
PSIS Semarang	2025–26	Championship	10	0	0	0	—		0	0	10	0
Career total			81	5	0	0	0	0	2	0	83	5

== Honours ==
=== Club ===
PS TNI U-21

- Indonesia Soccer Championship U-21: 2016
