= Hapit Ibrahim =

Indonesian footballer

Personal information
- Full name: Hapit Ibrahim
- Date of birth: 12 May 1993 (age 33)
- Place of birth: Jakarta, Indonesia
- Height: 1.69 m (5 ft 7 in)
- Position: Defensive midfielder

Team information
- Current team: Adhyaksa Bekasi
- Number: 16

Youth career
- 2011–2013: Sriwijaya

Senior career*
Years	Team	Apps	(Gls)
2013–2020	Sriwijaya	53	(0)
2018	→ PSIS Semarang (loan)	18	(0)
2020–2021	Muba Babel United	5	(0)
2021	PSPS Riau	5	(0)
2022	Deltras	6	(0)
2023–2024	Sriwijaya	13	(0)
2024–2025	Persikota Tangerang	20	(0)
2025–2026	Sumsel United	25	(0)
2026–	Adhyaksa Bekasi	0	(0)
- * Club domestic league appearances and goals as of 22:30, 2 May 2026 (UTC)

Hapit Ibrahim (born 12 May 1993) is an Indonesian professional footballer who plays as a defensive midfielder for Championship club Adhyaksa Bekasi.

== Club career ==
=== Sriwijaya ===
Hapit was born in Jakarta, Indonesia and made his debut with the main team of Sriwijaya on 15 September 2013 against Persiba Balikpapan at the Persiba Stadium, Balikpapan. he played replace Diego Michiels at 80th minutes.

==== PSIS Semarang (loan) ====
He was signed for PSIS Semarang to play in the Liga 1 in the 2018 season, on loan from Sriwijaya. Hapit made his league debut on 25 March 2018 in a match against PSM Makassar at the Andi Mattalatta Stadium, Makassar.

=== Muba Babel United ===
He was signed for Muba Babel United to play in Liga 2 in the 2020 season. This season was suspended on 27 March 2020 due to the COVID-19 pandemic. The season was abandoned and was declared void on 20 January 2021.

=== PSPS Riau ===
In 2021, Hapit signed a contract with Indonesian Liga 2 club PSPS Riau in the 2021 season. He made his league debut on 3 November 2021 in a match against Semen Padang at the Kaharudin Nasution Rumbai Stadium, Pekanbaru.

=== Deltras ===
Hapit was signed for Deltras to play in Liga 2 in the 2022–23 season.

== Honours ==
=== Club ===
Sriwijaya U-21

- Indonesia Super League U-21: 2012–13
