= Petar Planić =

Serbian footballer (born 1989)

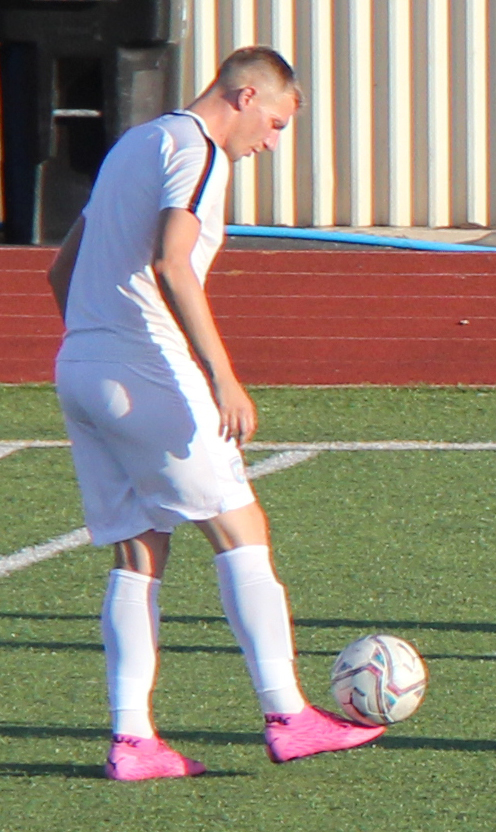
- Planić in 2022

Personal information
- Full name: Petar Planić
- Date of birth: 16 March 1989 (age 37)
- Place of birth: Kraljevo, SR Serbia, SFR Yugoslavia
- Height: 1.87 m (6 ft 2 in)
- Position: Centre-back

Team information
- Current team: Serbian White Eagles
- Number: 6

Senior career*
Years	Team	Apps	(Gls)
2005–2009	Metalac Kraljevo	63	(0)
2009–2012	OFK Beograd	42	(1)
2012–2013	BSK Borča	23	(0)
2013–2016	Sloga Petrovac	74	(5)
2016	Radnik Surdulica	1	(0)
2016–2017	Nejmeh	18	(0)
2017	Speranța Nisporeni	7	(2)
2018	PSIS Semarang	29	(0)
2019	OFK Sloga	10	(0)
2019	Chittagong Abahani	0	(0)
2020–2021	Maziya	0	(0)
2021–2022	Þór Akureyri	17	(0)
2022–	Serbian White Eagles	1	(0)
- * Club domestic league appearances and goals

Petar Planić (Serbian Cyrillic: Петар Планић; born 16 March 1989) is a Serbian professional footballer who plays as a centre-back for Canadian Soccer League club Serbian White Eagles.

== Club career ==
=== Serbian SuperLiga ===
He started with the local club Metalac Kraljevo. In 2009, he arrived at OFK Beograd, where he stayed for three seasons, usually playing as a right-back. In his second season with Beograd, he played in the 2010–11 UEFA Europa League in both matches against Torpedo-BelAZ Zhodino.

Then he moved to BSK Borča and played as a right-back and centre-back too. After the relegation of the club from the Serbian SuperLiga, he left the club and joined Sloga Petrovac. After three seasons in the second tier, he returned to the top tier to sign with Radnik Surdulica.

=== Lebanon ===
In 2017, he played abroad in the Middle East in the Lebanese Premier League club Nejmeh. Throughout his tenure in Lebanon, he played in the 2017 AFC Cup.

=== Moldova ===
Following his brief stint in Asia, he returned to Europe to play in the Moldovan National Division with Speranța Nisporeni. For the Moldovan side, he would appear in 7 matches and record 2 goals. He departed from Speranta during the winter of 2018.

=== Return to Asia ===
In 2018, he joined Liga 1 Indonesia club PSIS Semarang. After a series of frequent injuries, the club decided not to renew his contract for another season. He would return to Asia in 2019 to play with Chattogram Abahani in Bangladesh.

His third and final spell in Asia was in the Dhivehi Premier League with Maziya in 2020. He helped Maziya qualify for the 2020 AFC Cup after securing the league title.

=== Return to Europe ===
Following his short stint in Southeast Asia, he returned to the Balkan region in 2019 to play with OFK Sloga Gornje Crnjelovo in the second tier of Bosnia.

On 18 March 2021, he signed up for the Icelandic 1st division club Þór Akureyri. In his debut season in Iceland, he appeared in 17 matches. After a season with Akureyri, he departed from the club.

=== Canada ===
In the summer of 2022, he played abroad in the Canadian Soccer League with the Serbian White Eagles. He helped the Serbs in securing the regular-season title, including a playoff berth. Planić played in the second round of the postseason against the Continentals, where the White Eagles were eliminated. He re-signed with the Serbs for the 2023 season, where he participated in the Royal CSL Cup final, in which the Toronto Falcons defeated the White Eagles in a penalty shootout. The Serbs would finish the 2023 campaign as runners-up to Scarborough SC in the regular season.

He returned for his third season and helped Serbia win the Royal CSL Cup against Scarborough. He also contributed to securing the 2024 regular-season title. In 2025, Planić helped the Serbs win their second Royal CSL Cup.

== Managerial career ==
In 2023, he served as a coach for the Serbian White Eagles academy program.

== Career statistics ==
As of 27 August 2016

Club performance			League		Cup		Continental		Total	
Season	Club	League	Apps	Goals	Apps	Goals	Apps	Goals	Apps	Goals
2005–06	Metalac Kraljevo	Serbian League West	1	0	0	0	0	0	1	0
2006–07	Metalac Kraljevo	Serbian League West	17	0	0	0	0	0	17	0
2007–08	Metalac Kraljevo	Serbian League West	18	0	0	0	0	0	18	0
2008–09	Metalac Kraljevo	Serbian League West	27	0	0	0	0	0	27	0
2009–10	OFK Beograd	Serbian SuperLiga	21	1	0	0	0	0	21	1
2010–11	OFK Beograd	Serbian SuperLiga	15	0	1	0	0	0	16	0
2011–12	OFK Beograd	Serbian SuperLiga	6	0	1	0	0	0	7	0
2012–13	BSK Borča	Serbian SuperLiga	23	0	0	0	0	0	23	0
2013–14	Sloga Petrovac	Serbian First League	24	3	0	0	0	0	24	3
2014–15	Sloga Petrovac	Serbian First League	29	1	2	0	0	0	31	1
2015–16	Sloga Petrovac	Serbian First League	21	1	1	0	0	0	22	1
2016–17	Radnik Surdulica	SuperLiga	1	0	0	0	0	0	1	0
Career total			203	6	5	0	0	0	207	6

== Honours ==
Maziya

- Dhivehi Premier League: 2020–21

Serbian White Eagles

- Canadian Soccer League Regular Season: 2022, 2024
- Canadian Soccer League Royal CSL Cup: 2024, 2025
- Canadian Soccer League Royal CSL Cup runner-up: 2023
