= Hery Setaharinaivomanjato Raharisaina =

Malagasy politician

Dr. Hery Setaharinaivomanjato Raharisaina is a Malagasy politician. A member of the National Assembly of Madagascar, he was elected as a member of the Tiako I Madagasikara party; he represents the constituency of Vohemar.

He had been the minister of fishery in 2011.
