= Herry Susilo =

Indonesian footballer

Personal information
- Full name: Herry Susilo
- Date of birth: 3 October 1988 (age 38)
- Place of birth: Grobogan, Indonesia
- Height: 1.72 m (5 ft 8 in)
- Position: Full-back

Team information
- Current team: PSKC Cimahi
- Number: 19

Youth career
- 2003: Persipur Purwodadi
- 2004: Porda Grobogan
- 2005: Persipur Purwodadi
- 2008–2009: PSIS Semarang

Senior career*
Years	Team	Apps	(Gls)
2006–2008	Persipur Purwodadi		
2008–2011	PSIS Semarang	42	(1)
2011–2013	Persiba Balikpapan	24	(0)
2014–2015	Persipur Purwodadi	0	(0)
2016	PSIS Semarang	16	(0)
2017–2018	Persiba Balikpapan	22	(0)
2018	Kalteng Putra	9	(0)
2019	PSIM Yogyakarta	12	(0)
2020	Persijap Jepara	1	(0)
2021–2023	Dewa United	7	(0)
2022	→ Kalteng Putra (loan)	5	(0)
2023–	PSKC Cimahi	17	(0)
- * Club domestic league appearances and goals as of 6 February 2024

Herry Susilo (born 3 October 1988) is an Indonesian professional footballer who plays as a full-back for Liga 2 club PSKC Cimahi.

== Club career ==
=== Persijap Jepara ===
In 2020, Herry signed a contract with Indonesian Liga 2 club Persijap Jepara. This season was suspended on 27 March 2020 due to the COVID-19 pandemic. The season was abandoned and was declared void on 20 January 2021.

=== Dewa United ===
In 2021, Herry signed a contract with Indonesian Liga 2 club Dewa United. He made his league debut on 28 September against RANS Cilegon at the Gelora Bung Karno Madya Stadium, Jakarta.

== Honours ==
=== Club ===
Dewa United

- Liga 2 third place (play-offs): 2021
