= Iner Sontany Putra =

Indonesian footballer

Personal information
- Full name: Iner Sontany Putra
- Date of birth: 1 May 1995 (age 31)
- Place of birth: Jakarta, Indonesia
- Height: 1.71 m (5 ft 7 in)
- Position: Midfielder

Youth career
- 2007–2009: ASIOP Apacinti
- 2010: Indonesia Football Academy
- 2011–2013: Persiba Bantul
- 2013–2014: Pro Duta

Senior career*
Years	Team	Apps	(Gls)
2014–2015	Persitara Jakarta Utara	2	(0)
2015–2016	PSIM Yogyakarta	0	(0)
2016–2017	Mitra Kukar	3	(0)
2017–2018	DIT	5	(0)
2018–2019	Indera	18	(3)
2020	Lalenok United	0	(0)
2021	Željezničar Banja Luka	0	(0)
- * Club domestic league appearances and goals as of 27 March 2023

Iner Sontany Putra (born 1 May 1995) is an Indonesian footballer who plays as a midfielder.

== Club career ==
=== Željezničar Banja Luka ===
On 20 August 2021, he signed a contract to play for First League of the Republika Srpska club Željezničar Banja Luka.

== Honours ==
=== Club ===
Indera

- Brunei Super Cup: 2018
