= Rio Saputro =

Indonesian footballer

Personal information
- Full name: Muhammad Rio Saputro
- Date of birth: 7 December 1995 (age 30)
- Place of birth: Jepara, Indonesia
- Height: 1.84 m (6 ft 0 in)
- Position: Centre-back

Team information
- Current team: Persika Karanganyar

Youth career
- PS Mitra Buana
- 2013–2014: Persijap Jepara

Senior career*
Years	Team	Apps	(Gls)
2015	Persijap Jepara	13	(0)
2016–2022	PSIS Semarang	81	(2)
2023–2025	Malut United	18	(0)
2025	PSPS Pekanbaru	6	(0)
2026	PSIS Semarang	2	(0)
2026–	Persika Karanganyar	0	(0)
- * Club domestic league appearances and goals as of 25 April 2026

Muhammad Rio Saputro (born 7 December 1995) is an Indonesian professional footballer who plays as a centre-back for Liga Nusantara club Persika Karanganyar.

== Club career ==
In the middle of season of 2016 Indonesia Soccer Championship B, Rio joined PSIS Semarang from rival club, Persijap Jepara. He play his debut against Persekap Pasuruan with score 3-1 for PSIS Semarang. Rio failed to bring PSIS Semarang a quarter final in 2016 but success send PSIS Semarang to Liga 1 Indonesia one year later.

== Honours ==
=== Club ===
PSIS Semarang

- Liga 2 third place (play-offs): 2017

Malut United

- Liga 2 third place (play-offs): 2023–24
