= Hapidin =

Indonesian association footballer

Personal information
- Full name: Hapidin
- Date of birth: 11 July 1991 (age 35)
- Place of birth: Bandung, Indonesia
- Height: 1.77 m (5 ft 10 in)
- Position: Winger

Team information
- Current team: Persibat Batang
- Number: 99

Senior career*
Years	Team	Apps	(Gls)
2012–2017	Persibat Batang	57	(18)
2017	PSIS Semarang	1	(0)
2017	Persibat Batang	13	(3)
2018	Persiraja Banda Aceh	11	(7)
2018	Persibat Batang	8	(1)
2019–2020	Persis Solo	15	(1)
2021	Persijap Jepara	0	(0)
2021–2023	PSIM Yogyakarta	17	(1)
2023–2024	Persela Lamongan	9	(0)
2024–2025	Persiku Kudus	9	(0)
2025–	Persibat Batang	0	(0)
- * Club domestic league appearances and goals as of 20 February 2025

Hapidin (born 11 July 1991) is an Indonesian professional footballer who plays as a winger for Persibat Batang.

== Club career ==
=== Persibat Batang ===
Hapidin signed with Persibat Batang in 2012, where he played consistently for five years. He played a key role as Persibat Batang finished runner-up to Cilegon United in the 2014 Liga Indonesia First Division. In the final match, Persibat Batang was defeated 0–3 on penalties after a 1–1 draw following extra time on 28 September 2014. He scored the opening goal in the 13th minute, but missed the penalty in the shoot-out in the final against Cilegon United. He became the top scorer in that season (2014 Liga Indonesia First Division). He got a shinbone injury to his left foot when participating tarkam (amateur football competition contested by the village team) in Kebon Rowopucang, Pekalongan in 2015 when PSSI was banned by FIFA and the government. Hapidin went "viral" after he intended to sell his Golden Boot trophy of 2014 Liga Indonesia First Division. Hapidin admits he needs money for the cost of treating his injuries. On 2017, Hapidin helped Persibat Batang reach the second round.

=== PSIS Semarang ===
Hapidin has officially joined Liga 1 club PSIS Semarang on Wednesday, 20 December 2017.

=== Persiraja Banda Aceh ===
Hapidin signed for Persiraja Banda Aceh on 22 April 2018 to play 2018 Liga 2. He made his debut for Persiraja when Persiraja lost 1–2 to Hapidin's former club Persibat Batang on 29 April 2018. His first goal for Persiraja came when Persiraja won 2–0 to PSIR Rembang on 4 May 2018, where he scored a brace from a direct corner kick and a direct free kick. A week later, he scored the winning goal from a direct free kick when Persiraja won 1–0 to Persis Solo. When Persiraja had away match to Persika Karawang on 15 May 2018, Hapidin scored an equalizing goal for Persiraja, and once again, from a direct free kick. When Persiraja lost 2–4 in away game to Persita on July 4, 2018, once again he scored both goals for his club, from a direct free kick and an open play. On July 8, 2018, he scored a goal from a direct free kick when Persiraja lost to Semen Padang in an away game. For 2018 season, he has scored totally 7 goals, 6 of which were from direct set pieces.

=== Persis Solo ===
In 2019, Hapidin signed a one-year contract with Indonesian Liga 2 club Persis Solo.

== Honours ==
=== Club ===
Persibat Batang

- Liga Indonesia First Division runner-up: 2014

=== Individual honours ===
- Liga Indonesia First Division Top Goalscorer: 2014
