= Erik Dwi Ermawansyah =

Indonesian footballer (1996–2019)

Erik Dwi
Personal information
- Full name: Erik Dwi Ermawansyah
- Date of birth: 19 April 1996
- Place of birth: Surabaya, Indonesia
- Date of death: 25 January 2019 (aged 22)
- Place of death: Kendal, Indonesia
- Height: 1.66 m (5 ft 5 in)
- Position: Forward

Youth career
- 2013: Persebaya Surabaya
- 2014: Persebaya DU

Senior career*
Years	Team	Apps	(Gls)
2015–2016	Bhayangkara	10	(0)
2016	Madura United	6	(0)
2017–2018	PSIS Semarang	24	(5)
2018	Persik Kendal	0	(0)
Total		40	(5)
- * Club domestic league appearances and goals

Erik Dwi Ermawansyah (19 April 1996 – 25 January 2019) was an Indonesian professional footballer who played as a forward.

== Career ==
=== Bhayangkara FC ===
Dwi Ermawansyah was a player from Persebaya Surabaya juniors with Evan Dimas, before Erik's promotion to the senior team of Persebaya Surabaya. The dualism that hit Persebaya at that time, made Erik finally start his senior career in 2015 with the Persebaya DU team which later changed to Bonek FC and then Bhayangkara Presisi Lampung F.C. today.

=== PSIS Semarang ===
In 2017, Dwi Ermawansyah joined PSIS Semarang to play in the 2017 Liga 2. According to the General Manager of PSIS, Wahyu Winarto, Dwi Ermawansyah was brought in to strengthen the defense. Erik would have joined Persiba Balikpapan, but eventually the loan was cancelled when the management of Persiba Balikpapan got word that Dwi Ermawansyah was not under contract with Madura United.
