= Arif Yanggi Rahman =

Indonesian footballer

Personal information
- Full name: Arif Yanggi Rahman
- Date of birth: 20 February 1994 (age 32)
- Place of birth: Solok, Indonesia
- Height: 1.75 m (5 ft 9 in)
- Position: Winger

Youth career
- 2014: Semen Padang U-21

Senior career*
Years	Team	Apps	(Gls)
2015–2016	Persip Pekalongan	0	(0)
2016–2017	PSIS Semarang	11	(0)
2017	Persik Kediri	14	(4)
2018	Persis Solo	11	(0)
2019	Persik Kediri	2	(1)
2020	Persekat Tegal	0	(0)
2021	Hizbul Wathan	6	(1)
2022	Persipa Pati	2	(0)
2023	Persiba Balikpapan	4	(0)
- * Club domestic league appearances and goals as of 6 February 2024

Arif Yanggi Rahman (born, 20 February 1994) is an Indonesian professional footballer who plays as a winger.

== Club career ==
=== PSIS Semarang ===
In second season of 2016 Indonesia Soccer Championship B, Arif Yanggi joined PSIS Semarang together with his teammate in Persip Pekalongan, Iwan Wahyudi. He made his debut against Persekap Pasuruan which ended in a 3–1 win for PSIS Semarang.

=== Persekat Tegal ===
He was signed for Persekat Tegal to play in Liga 2 in the 2020 season. This season was suspended on 27 March 2020 due to the COVID-19 pandemic. The season was abandoned and was declared void on 20 January 2021.

=== Hizbul Wathan FC ===
In 2021, Arif Yanggi signed a contract with Indonesian Liga 2 club Hizbul Wathan. He made his league debut on 4 October against PSIM Yogyakarta. On 18 October 2021, Arif Yanggi scored his first goal for Hizbul Wathan against Persis Solo in the 65th minute at the Manahan Stadium, Surakarta.

== Honours ==
=== Club ===
Semen Padang U-21

- Indonesia Super League U-21: 2014
