= Jandia Eka Putra =

Indonesian footballer

Jandia Eka
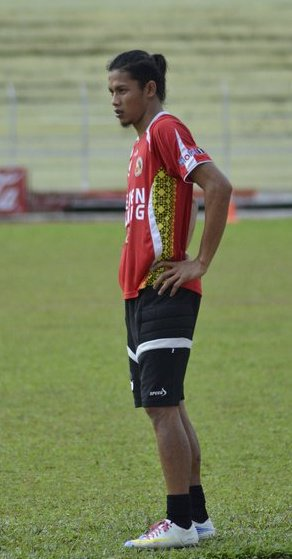
- Jandia with Semen Padang in 2013

Personal information
- Full name: Jandia Eka Putra
- Date of birth: 14 July 1987 (age 39)
- Place of birth: Padang, Indonesia
- Height: 1.80 m (5 ft 11 in)
- Position: Goalkeeper

Youth career
- PSTS Tabing

Senior career*
Years	Team	Apps	(Gls)
2007–2009	PSP Padang	30	(0)
2009–2018	Semen Padang	135	(0)
2018–2022	PSIS Semarang	71	(0)
2022	PSS Sleman	2	(0)
2023–2024	Kalteng Putra	8	(0)
2024	Sriwijaya	5	(0)
2025	Persikas Subang	8	(0)
2025–2026	Persikota Tangerang	7	(0)

International career
2012	Indonesia	1	(0)
- * Club domestic league appearances and goals as of 12 January 2026

Jandia Eka Putra (born 14 July 1987), is an Indonesian professional footballer who plays as a goalkeeper.

== Club career ==
=== PSIS Semarang ===
He was signed for PSIS Semarang to play in Liga 1 in the 2018 season. Jandia made his league debut on 25 March 2018 in a match against PSM Makassar at the Andi Mattalatta Stadium, Makassar.

=== PSS Sleman ===
He was signed for PSS Sleman to play in Liga 1 in the 2022–23 season. Jandia made his league debut on 13 August 2022 in a match against Barito Putera at the Maguwoharjo Stadium, Sleman.

== International career ==
Jandia Eka was called up to the Indonesia national football team, and made his debut on 17 May 2012 in a friendly match against Mauritania at the Nablus Football Stadium, Nablus.

== Honours ==
Semen Padang

- Indonesia Premier League: 2011–12
- Indonesian Community Shield: 2013
- Piala Indonesia runner-up: 2012
