= Aji Bayu Putra =

Indonesian footballer

Personal information
- Full name: Aji Bayu Putra
- Date of birth: 11 May 1993 (age 33)
- Place of birth: Brebes, Indonesia
- Height: 1.86 m (6 ft 1 in)
- Position: Goalkeeper

Team information
- Current team: Persipa Pati
- Number: 33

Senior career*
Years	Team	Apps	(Gls)
2012	Persab Brebes	12	(0)
2013–2014	Persekabpur Purworejo	23	(0)
2014–2016	PS Badung	31	(0)
2017–2018	PSIS Semarang	23	(0)
2018	Persiba Balikpapan	5	(0)
2019	Badak Lampung	0	(0)
2019	PSIM Yogyakarta	2	(0)
2020–2022	Persiraja Banda Aceh	16	(0)
2022–2023	Gresik United	0	(0)
2023–	Persipa Pati	3	(0)
- * Club domestic league appearances and goals as of 22 October 2023

Aji Bayu Putra (born 11 May 1993) is an Indonesian professional footballer who plays as a goalkeeper for Liga 2 club Persipa Pati.

== Club career ==
=== PSIS Semarang ===
After enroll the Trial, January 20, 2017. Aji signed a contract with PSIS Semarang.

=== Persiraja Banda Aceh ===
The newly promoted club, Persiraja Banda Aceh, confirmed that Aji Bayu will play for them to compete in 2020 Liga 1. This season was suspended on 27 March 2020 due to the COVID-19 pandemic. The season was abandoned and was declared void on 20 January 2021.

=== PSM Makassar ===
Aji Bayu was signed for PSM Makassar to play in Liga 1 in the 2022–23 season.
