= Persibat Batang =

Indonesian football club

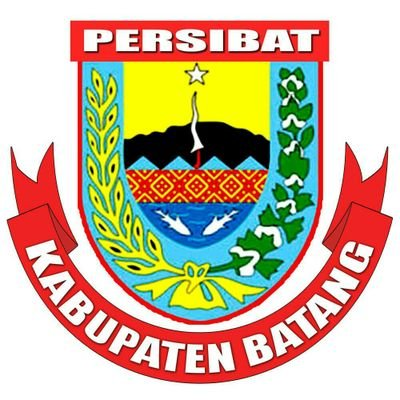
- Full name: Persatuan Sepakbola Indonesia Batang
- Nicknames: Banteng Alas Roban (Bull of Roban Forest), Laskar Alas Roban
- Founded: 5 September 1974; 51 years ago
- Ground: Moh Sarengat Stadium
- Capacity: 15,000
- Owner: PT. Persibat Batang Indonesia
- Chairman: Muhammad Ali Balki
- Manager: Ahmad Dahlan
- Coach: Lukas Torona Tumbuan
- League: Liga 4
- 2024–25: Semi-finals (Central Java zone); Third round, 4th in Group A (National phase)
Home colours	Away colours

Persatuan Sepakbola Indonesia Batang, commonly known as Persibat Batang, is an Indonesian football club based in Batang Regency, Central Java, Indonesia. They currently compete in the Liga 4.

== Season-by-season records ==
Season(s)	League/Division	Tms.	Pos.	Piala Indonesia
2007	First Division	40	4th, Group II	–
2008–09	Premier Division	29	14th, Group 1	–
2010	First Division	57	Withdrew	–
2013	First Division	77	3rd, First round	–
2014	First Division	73	2	–
2015	Premier Division	season abandoned		–
2016	ISC B	53	4th, Group 4	–
2017				
2018
2019
2020	Liga 3	season abandoned		–
2021–22	Liga 3	64	Eliminated in Provincial round	–
2022–23	Liga 3	season abandoned		–
2023–24				
2024–25	Liga 4	64	4th, Third round	–
2025–26	Liga 4	64	Eliminated in Provincial round	–

== Players ==
=== Current squad ===
As of 3 September 2021

Note: Flags indicate national team as defined under FIFA eligibility rules; some limited exceptions apply. Players may hold more than one non-FIFA nationality.

No.	Pos.	Nation	Player
—	GK	IDN	Iqbal Lesmana
—	GK	IDN	Azam Ramadhan
—	DF	IDN	Slamet Aryanto
—	DF	IDN	Febriansyah
—	DF	IDN	Gedhong Pambudi
—	DF	IDN	Wisnu Aji
—	DF	IDN	Muhammad Shofa
—	DF	IDN	Muhammad Auliya
—	DF	IDN	Sofyan Fadillah
—	DF	IDN	M. Yusuf
—	DF	IDN	Jajang Sukmara
—	MF	IDN	Wahyu Sosilo

No.	Pos.	Nation	Player
—	MF	IDN	Ahmad Duwair
—	MF	IDN	Almandani
—	MF	IDN	Muhammad Irfan
—	MF	IDN	Yudhis Adriatama
—	MF	IDN	David Lumbantoruan
—	MF	IDN	Irfan Ariyanto
—	MF	IDN	Musbiandi
—	MF	IDN	Handaru Nurjaman
—	MF	IDN	Rafid Lestaluhu
—	FW	IDN	Hapidin
—	FW	IDN	Ferdinand Sinaga
—	FW	IDN	Yusron

== Former players ==
- (Thailand) Jetsada Jitsawad (2004-2005)
- (Thailand) Sakda Joemdee (2004)
- (Liberia) Roberto Kwateh (2005)
- (Indonesia) Su’ari (2004-2008)
- (Indonesia) Ferdinand Sinaga (2007)
- (Brazil) Ronnie Von de Carvalho (2007)
- (Indonesia) Budiman Yunus (2006–2008)
- (Liberia) Morris Bayour Power (2007–2008)
- (Guinea) Lamarana Diallo (2008)
- (Indonesia) Indra Gunawan (2008–2009)
- (Indonesia) Imran Usman (2014)
- (Indonesia) Syaeful Anwar (2016–2017)
- (Indonesia) Mochammad Sabillah (2017)
- (Indonesia) Rosad Setiawan (2017)
- (Indonesia) Supriyono Salimin (2017)
- (Indonesia) Eki Nurhakim (2015-2017)
- (Indonesia) Busari (2018)
- (Indonesia) Hapidin (2018)
- (Indonesia) Rendy Saputra (2018)
- (Indonesia) Apriliawan “Sion” Rizal (2017-2018)

== Kit suppliers ==
- Vilour (2014)
- MBB (2015–2016)
- DJ Sport (2017)
- RIORS (2018)
- Maknorukun (2019–2020)
- Panguripan Sport Apparel (2021-present)

== Supporter ==
- ROBAN MANIA
- Brigatta Ultras Roban
- Roban Rewo Rewo (R3)

== Honours ==
- Liga Indonesia First Division

- Runners-up (1): 2014
