= 2010–11 Persipura Jayapura season =

Persipura
2010–11 season
- Chairman: M.R. Kambu
- Head Coach: Jacksen F. Tiago
- Ground: Mandala Stadium
- Super League: Champions
- AFC Cup: Quarter-final
- Top goalscorer: League: Boaz (22); All: Boaz (27)
- Highest home attendance: 25,000 (30 January vs Sriwijaya, Super League); 25,000 (2 February vs Persib, Super League)
- Lowest home attendance: 700 (16 March vs East Bengal, AFC Cup)
Home colours	Away colours

The 2010–11 season is Persipura Jayapura's 3rd season in the Indonesia Super League. Persipura will try to win their second trophy in three seasons, competing in the Super League, the AFC Cup, and the Indonesia Cup.

== Key events ==
- 1 July: Striker Qu Cheng leave Persipura after failing to agree contract extensions.
- 10 July: Persipura confirm the signing of Liberia Midfielder Zah Rahan on a "short-term contract for an undisclosed fee" from Sriwijaya.
- 2 August: Erol Iba joins Persebaya 1927 on a free transfer.
- 8 August: Striker Titus Bonay joins Persipura on a free transfer from Persiram on a "short-term contract".
- 18 August: Defender Hamka Hamzah joins Persipura on a free transfer from Persisam on a "short-term contract".
- 18 August: Goalkeeper Yandri Pitoy leaves Persipura after spending five years to join Perseman.
- 18 August: Defender Edison Ames joins Persidafon for an undisclosed fee after spending three years at Persipura.
- 23 August: Defender Steven Hendambo joins Persipura on a free transfer from Persiba on a "short-term contract".
- 31 August: Captain Eduard Ivakdalam leave Persipura after spending 16 years with stunning won two championships in the seasons 2005 and 2008-09, and he joins Persidafon on a free transfer.
- 17 September: Persipura confirm the signing of Korea Goalkeeper Yoo Jae-Hun from Daejeon on a free transfer.
- 17 September: Goalkeeper Eki Sabilillah joins Persipura from Persebaya on a free transfer on a "short-term contract".
- 22 September: Defender Yohanis Tjoe joins Persipura on a free transfer from Pro Titan on a "short-term contract".
- 7 December: In drawing Persipura enter into Group H together with (Hong Kong) South China, (Thailand) Chonburi and (India) East Bengal in the event 2011 AFC Cup.
- 5 January: Indonesia U-23 call-up five player from Persipura namely David Laly, Imanuel Wanggai, Lukas Mandowen, Stevie Bonsapia and Titus Bonay for 2012 Olympic qualification and preparation for the 2011 SEA Games.
- 17 January: Persipura take over again top of the league from Semen Padang.
- 17 January: Two young players Persipura David Laly and Titus Bonay passed the national team that will compete in the Pre Olympics.
- 6 February: Persipura suffered his first defeat this season obtained from Arema FC with the score 1–0.
- 2 March: Persipura started his struggle in the 2011 AFC Cup against South China.
- 16 March: Persipura produced a dominant performance to claim three points from their AFC Cup Group H clash with East Bengal at Gelora Bung Karno.
- 28 March: AFC has approved the use of Mandala Stadium in Jayapura, Indonesia, as Persipura Jayapura's home venue for their remaining AFC Cup group matches.
- 13 April: Persipura ensured the first-ever continental game at Mandala Stadium will be remembered for some time to come after they downed Chonburi 3–0.
- 13 April: Persipura coach Jacksen Tiago was ecstatic to see his side come out on top in the first-ever continental game played at Mandala Stadium after the Indonesians beat Chonburi 3–0 to go top of AFC Cup Group H.
- 18 April: Persipura establish itself at the top of the Indonesia Super League standings after successfully overthrowing Persiba Balikpapan at the Mandala Stadium, Jayapura, Monday, April 18 evening.
- 26 April: Pipob On-Mo scored twice as Chonburi moved to the top of Group H in the AFC Cup with a 4–1 win over Persipura Jayapura on Tuesday, a scoreline that easily could have been more emphatic.
- 26 April: Chonburi may have boosted their chances of reaching the last 16 in the AFC Cup with an emphatic 4–1 win over Group H leaders Persipura Jayapura at Chonburi PE Stadium but boss Withaya Laohakul was still not completely satisfied with his side's performance.
- 3 May: Perispura booked their place in the last 16 of the AFC Cup as Boas Solossa's double secured a 4–2 win over South China at Mandala Stadium.
- 3 May: Persipura boss Jacksen Tiago praised his players for executing his plans to the letter as they beat South China 4–2 to book their place in the last 16 of the AFC Cup.
- 10 May: East Bengal came from behind to earn a share of the spoils against Persipura with a 1–1 draw in their concluding Group H AFC Cup match that sees the Indonesians finish second in the table following Chonburi's 3–0 victory at South China.
- 10 May: Persipura coach Jacksen Tiago was left to rue his team's inability to kill off the game in the first half as the visitors had to settle for a 1–1 draw against East Bengal in their concluding Group H AFC Cup clash on Tuesday.
- 25 May: Goals from Boaz and Ortizan Solossa sandwiched a strike from Titus Bonai as Persipura reached the quarter-finals of the AFC Cup with a 3–1 win at Song Lam Nghe An.
- 25 May: Persipura boss Jacksen Tiago was delighted his side could end their poor away form in the AFC Cup and secure a place in the last eight following a 3–1 win over Song Lam Nghe An at Vinh Stadium.
- 31 May: Persipura has come closer to Indonesia Super League title this season after successfully defeating host Persela with the score 1–0 at the Surajaya Stadium on Tuesday.
- 7 June: West Asian teams will aim to maintain their stranglehold on the AFC Cup trophy as four teams from the region discovered the identity of their opponents in the quarter-final stage on Tuesday.
- 8 June: Persipura ultimately ensure themselves a champion 2010-11 Indonesia Super League after they conquered Persisam Putra Samarinda 2–1 in Segiri Stadium, on Wednesday, 8 June.
- 19 June: Feast of a thousand fireworks at Mandala Stadium, Jayapura, coloring the atmosphere of joy after the PT Liga Indonesia championship trophy handed to the team Persipura Jayapura, which became the winner of Indonesia Super League.
- 29 June: After winning the title Indonesia Super League (ISL) season 2010-2011, Persipura extend the glory by beating the All Stars 2-1 (1-1) in the 2011 All-Star Games that took place at the Mandala Stadium, Jayapura, on Wednesday (29 / 6).

== Players ==
=== Squad information ===
N	Pos.	Nat.	Name	Age	EU	Since	App	Goals	Ends	Transfer fee	Notes
1	GK	(South Korea)	Jae-Hun	43	Non-EU	2010	21	0	undisclosed	Free	
23	DF	(Indonesia)	Hamka	42	Non-EU	2010	19	1	undisclosed	Free	
32	DF	(Nigeria)	Igbonefo	41	Non-EU	2006 (Winter)	158	8	undisclosed	Free	
45	DF	(Cameroon)	Bio Paulin	42	Non-EU	2007 (Winter)	118	5	undisclosed	Free	
26	DF	(Indonesia)	Ortizan	49	Non-EU	2008	83	5	undisclosed	Free	
13	MF	(Indonesia)	Ian Kabes	40	Non-EU	2005 (Winter)	102	19	undisclosed	Youth system	
15	MF	(Indonesia)	Pangkali	44	Non-EU	2008	80	1	undisclosed	Free	
11	MF	(Indonesia)	Manu	38	Non-EU	2005 (Winter)	57	1	undisclosed	Youth system	
10	MF	(Liberia)	Zah Rahan	41	Non-EU	2010	24	7	undisclosed	Free	
86	FW	(Indonesia)	Boaz (captain)	40	Non-EU	2005 (Winter)	117	95	undisclosed	Youth system	
25	FW	(Indonesia)	Tibo	37	Non-EU	2010	22	7	undisclosed	Free	Youth system in the season 2008-09
4	DF	(Indonesia)	Ricardo	42	Non-EU	2006 (Winter)	136	7	undisclosed	Free	Injured until February or March 2011
7	MF	(Indonesia)	Bonsapia	38	Non-EU	2006	75	4	undisclosed	Youth system	
21	FW	(Indonesia)	Tinus	43	Non-EU	2007	66	8	undisclosed	Free	
6	MF	(Indonesia)	Laly	35	Non-EU	2009	32	0	undisclosed	Youth system	
33	FW	(Indonesia)	Luky	37	Non-EU	2010	27	7	undisclosed	Youth system	top scorer in the Super League U-21
9	FW	(Indonesia)	Rivai	48	Non-EU	2010	15	2	undisclosed	Free	
17	DF	(Indonesia)	Tjoe	41	Non-EU	2010	16	0	undisclosed	Free	
20	GK	(Indonesia)	Ferdiansyah	43	Non-EU	2007 (Winter)	14	0	2011	Free	
8	MF	(Indonesia)	David	41	Non-EU	2009	11	0	undisclosed	Youth system	
43	DF	(Indonesia)	Marco	35	Non-EU	2010	2	0	undisclosed	Youth system	
14	MF	(Indonesia)	Romario	36	Non-EU	2010	2	0	undisclosed	Youth system	the league debut on 2 February 2011 against Persib in Super League
30	GK	(Indonesia)	Eki	44	Non-EU	2010	0	0	undisclosed	Free	
5	DF	(Indonesia)	Hendambo	40	Non-EU	2010	0	0	undisclosed	Free	
14	DF	(Indonesia)	Sapulette	34–35	Non-EU	2010	0	0	undisclosed	Youth system	
16	MF	(Indonesia)	Gabriel	35–36	Non-EU	2010	0	0	undisclosed	Youth system	

- Last updated: 20 June 2011
- Source: Persipura Jayapura
- Ordered by starting 11, then appearances.

=== Reserve squad ===
Note: Flags indicate national team as defined under FIFA eligibility rules; some limited exceptions apply. Players may hold more than one non-FIFA nationality.

No.	Pos.	Nation	Player
4	DF	IDN	Aldo Fernando Kalem
5	DF	IDN	Yohan Imanuel Maniagasi
7	MF	IDN	Fredrik Hendrik Ohee
8	MF	IDN	Ravel Zakeus Ohee
9	FW	IDN	Benny Alexander Da Costa
10	FW	IDN	Hendrik Fandekris Rewang
12	MF	IDN	Fernando Albert Davidson Sekewael
13	FW	IDN	Marthin Stanley Wally
14	DF	IDN	Marthen Karafir
15	DF	IDN	Arnold Mucklis Haay
16	MF	IDN	Gilbert Richard Dwaramury
17	MF	IDN	Christison Benyamin Dimara
18	DF	IDN	Briaen Richardo Sainyakit

No.	Pos.	Nation	Player
19	DF	IDN	Rizad Rahakbauw
20	GK	IDN	Nur Apandy
21	MF	IDN	Felix Meraudje
22	FW	IDN	Orgenes Jakadewa
23	MF	IDN	Mika Harkes Nasadit
24	MF	IDN	Sempari Yeremia Matui
25	GK	IDN	Danikus Ramandai
28	MF	IDN	Andrias Krispul
29	FW	IDN	Rivard Mehue
30	FW	IDN	Vence Leonardo Yaas
31	GK	IDN	Soleman Dimara
32	DF	IDN	Daniel Siogama Tata

== Transfers ==
=== In ===
==== First team ====
Date	Pos.	Name	From	Fee
10 July 2010	MF	(Liberia) Zah Rahan Krangar	(Indonesia) Sriwijaya	Free
8 August 2010	FW	(Indonesia) Titus Bonay	(Indonesia) Persiram	Free
18 August 2010	DF	(Indonesia) Hamka Hamzah	Free agent	Free
August 2010	FW	(Indonesia) Rahmat Rivai	(Indonesia) Sriwijaya	Free
23 August 2010	DF	(Indonesia) Steven Hendambo	(Indonesia) Persiba	Free
17 September 2010	GK	(South Korea) Yoo Jae-Hun	(South Korea) Daejeon	Free
17 September 2010	FW	(Indonesia) Eki Sabilillah	(Indonesia) Persebaya	Free
22 September 2010	DF	(Indonesia) Yohanis Tjoe	Free agent	Free

==== Reserve team ====
Date	Pos.	Name	From	Fee

=== Out ===
==== First team ====
Date	Pos.	Name	To	Fee
1 July 2010	FW	(China) Qu Cheng	Released	N/A
2 August 2010	DF	(Indonesia) Erol Iba	(Indonesia) Persebaya 1927	Free
18 August 2010	DF	(Indonesia) Yandri Pitoy	(Indonesia) Perseman	Free
18 August 2010	DF	(Indonesia) Edison Ames	(Indonesia) Persidafon	Free
31 August 2010	MF	(Indonesia) Eduard Ivakdalam	(Indonesia) Persidafon	Free

==== Reserve team ====
Date	Pos.	Name	To	Fee
September 2010	FW	(Indonesia) Permenas Iwanggin	Join with Papua Pre-PON team	Free

== Squad statistics ==
=== Appearances and goals ===
Statistics accurate as of match played 19 June 2011

No.	Nat.	Pos.	Name	League			Indonesia Cup		Asia		Appearances		Goals
No.	Nat.	Pos.	Name	Apps	Minutes	Goals	Apps	Goals	Apps	Goals	App (sub)	Total	Goals
1	(South Korea)	GK	Yoo Jae-Hun	21	1800	0	0	0	6	0	27 (0)	27	0
4	(Indonesia)	DF	Ricardo Salampessy	4 (4)	375	0	0	0	0	0	4 (4)	8	0
5	(Indonesia)	DF	Steven Hendambo	0	0	0	0	0	1 (2)	0	1 (2)	3	0
6	(Indonesia)	MF	David Laly	1 (8)	155	0	0	0	1 (2)	0	2 (10)	12	0
7	(Indonesia)	MF	Stevie Bonsapia	11 (15)	1460	2	0	0	3 (4)	1	14 (19)	33	3
8	(Indonesia)	MF	David Uron	3 (3)	300	0	0	0	0 (3)	0	3 (6)	9	0
9	(Indonesia)	FW	Rahmat Rivai	13 (1)	758	2	0	0	1	0	14 (1)	15	2
10	(Liberia)	MF	Zah Rahan	24	2139	6	0	0	7	1	31 (0)	31	8
11	(Indonesia)	MF	Imanuel Wanggai	17	1805	0	0	0	2	0	19 (0)	19	0
13	(Indonesia)	MF	Ian Kabes	27 (1)	2437	7	0	0	7	0	34 (1)	35	7
14	(Indonesia)	MF	Moses Banggo	0 (2)	16	0	0	0	0	0	0 (2)	2	0
15	(Indonesia)	MF	Gerald Pangkali	23 (2)	1981	1	0	0	7	1	30 (2)	32	2
16	(Indonesia)	MF	Gabriel Duaramuri	0	0	0	0	0	0	0	0 (0)	0	0
17	(Indonesia)	DF	Yohanis Tjoe	11 (5)	970	0	0	0	3 (2)	0	14 (7)	21	0
20	(Indonesia)	GK	Ferdiansyah	8	728	0	0	0	1	0	9 (0)	9	0
21	(Indonesia)	FW	Yustinus Pae	15 (9)	1212	3	0	0	5	1	21 (8)	29	4
23	(Indonesia)	DF	Hamka Hamzah	19	1710	1	0	0	2	0	21 (0)	21	1
25	(Indonesia)	FW	Titus Bonai	16 (5)	1357	7	0	0	6	4	22 (5)	27	11
26	(Indonesia)	DF	Ortizan Solossa	22 (1)	1947	1	0	0	5	1	27 (1)	28	2
30	(Indonesia)	GK	Eki Sabilillah	0	0	0	0	0	0	0	0 (0)	0	0
32	(Nigeria)	DF	Victor Igbonefo	27	2438	1	0	0	7	0	34 (0)	34	1
33	(Indonesia)	FW	Lukas Mandowen	2 (25)	839	7	0	0	0 (7)	2	2 (32)	34	9
43	(Indonesia)	DF	Marco Kabiay	0 (1)	7	0	0	0	0	0	0 (1)	1	0
45	(Cameroon)	DF	Bio Paulin	26	2323	2	0	0	7	1	33 (0)	33	3
86	(Indonesia)	FW	Boaz Solossa	28	3062	22	0	0	6	5	34 (0)	34	27
14	(Indonesia)	DF	Sinyo Sapulette*	0	0	0	0	0	0	0	0 (0)	0	0

* = Lent to the team Persipura U-21.

=== Scorers ===
==== All ====
Scorer	Goals
(Indonesia) Boaz Solossa	27
(Indonesia) Titus Bonai	11
(Indonesia) Lukas Mandowen	9
(Liberia) Zah Rahan	8
(Indonesia) Ian Kabes	7
(Indonesia) Tinus Pae	4
(Indonesia) Stevie Bonsapia	3
(Cameroon) Bio Paulin	3
(Indonesia) Rahmat Rivai	2
(Indonesia) Gerald Pangkali	2
(Indonesia) Ortizan Solossa	2
(Indonesia) Hamka Hamzah	1
(Nigeria) Victor Igbonefo	1

==== League ====
Scorer	Goals
(Indonesia) Boaz Solossa	22
(Indonesia) Lukas Mandowen	7
(Indonesia) Titus Bonai	7
(Liberia) Zah Rahan	7
(Indonesia) Ian Kabes	7
(Indonesia) Tinus Pae	3
(Indonesia) Rahmat Rivai	2
(Indonesia) Stevie Bonsapia	2
(Cameroon) Bio Paulin	2
(Indonesia) Hamka Hamzah	1
(Indonesia) Gerald Pangkali	1
(Nigeria) Victor Igbonefo	1
(Indonesia) Ortizan Solossa	1

==== AFC Cup ====
Scorer	Goals
(Indonesia) Boaz Solossa	5
(Indonesia) Titus Bonai	4
(Indonesia) Lukas Mandowen	2
(Indonesia) Stevie Bonsapia	1
(Indonesia) Yustinus Pae	1
(Cameroon) Bio Paulin	1
(Liberia) Zah Rahan	1
(Indonesia) Gerald Pangkali	1
(Indonesia) Ortizan Solossa	1

==== Indonesia Cup ====
Scorer	Goals

As of games played 19 June 2011

=== Disciplinary record ===
N	Pos.	Nat.	Name	Yellow card	Second yellow card	Red card	Notes
26	DF	(Indonesia)	Ortizan .S	7	1		
15	MF	(Indonesia)	G. Pangkali	7			
45	DF	(Cameroon)	Bio Paulin	6			
15	MF	(Indonesia)	Anis Tjoe	5	1		
32	DF	(Nigeria)	V. Igbonefo	5	1		
11	MF	(Indonesia)	I. Wanggai	4			
13	MF	(Indonesia)	Kabes	4			
10	MF	(Liberia)	Z.R. Krangar	3			
13	MF	(Indonesia)	S. Bonsapia	3			
33	FW	(Indonesia)	Mandowen	3			
86	FW	(Indonesia)	Boaz	2			
25	FW	(Indonesia)	Tibo	2			
23	DF	(Indonesia)	Hamka	1			
33	FW	(Indonesia)	Tinus Pae	1			
20	GK	(Indonesia)	Ferdiansyah	1			
8	MF	(Indonesia)	Uron	1			

Last updated: 20 June 2011
Source: Match reports in Competitive matches
Only competitive matches
(yellow card) = Number of bookings; (second yellow card) = Number of sending offs after a second yellow card; (red card) = Number of sending offs by a direct red card.

== Club ==
=== Coaching staff ===
Position	Staff
Manager	(Indonesia) Anthon Yoas Imbenai
Head coach	(Brazil) Jacksen F. Tiago
Assistant coach	(Indonesia) Mettu Duaramuri
Goalkeeping Coach	(Indonesia) Alan Haviludin
Fitness coach	(Brazil) Oswaldo Lessa
Club doctor	(Indonesia) Dr. Jhon Kambu
Measseur 1	(Indonesia) Stevie Lopulalan
Measseur 2	(Indonesia) Suprianto

Last updated: 4 July 2011
Source: Persipura Jayapura

=== Kit ===
The 2010–11 Persipura home and away kit was confirmed on 3 March 2011.

Supplier: Specs
Sponsor(s): PT Semen Bosowa Maros & Bank Papua

Home	Away

Last updated: 3 March 2011.
Source: Specs online store

=== Other information ===
Chairman	(Indonesia) M.R. Kambu
Secretary	(Indonesia) Antonius Imbenay
Treasurer	(Indonesia) Rudi Maswi
Ground (capacity and dimensions)	Mandala Stadium (30,000 / 113x76 meters)

Updated to match played 3 March 2011
Source: Persipura Jayapura

== Competitions ==
=== Overall ===
Competition	Started round	Current position / round	Final position / round	First match	Last match
Super League	–	1	Champions	26 September 2010	19 June 2011
AFC Cup	Group Stage	Quarter-final		2 March 2011	
Indonesia Cup	not held				

Last updated: 19 June 2011
Source: Competitions' Wikipedia articles.

=== Super League ===
==== Standings ====
Pos	Team	Pld	W	D	L	GF	GA	GD	Pts	Qualification
1	Persipura (C)	28	17	9	2	63	23	+40	60	Qualification for AFC Champions League qualifying play-off
2	Arema Indonesia	28	15	7	6	52	25	+27	52	Qualification for AFC Cup group stage (Note: Arema qualified for the AFC Cup as league runners-up since Piala Indonesia was not held in 2011.)
3	Persija	28	15	7	6	52	28	+24	52	
4	Semen Padang	28	12	12	4	41	27	+14	48	
5	Sriwijaya	28	13	7	8	43	32	+11	46	

Source: Indonesia Super League Table
Rules for classification: 1) points; 2) goal difference; 3) number of goals scored.
(C) Champions

==== Results summary ====
Overall								Home						Away					
Pld	W	D	L	GF	GA	GD	Pts	W	D	L	GF	GA	GD	W	D	L	GF	GA	GD
28	17	9	2	63	23	+40	60	12	2	0	43	11	+32	5	7	2	20	12	+8

Last updated: 19 June 2011.
Source: Super League

==== Matches ====
26 September 2010 1	Semen Padang	1 – 1	Persipura	Padang
15:25 WIB	Wilson 7'; Vendry (yellow card) 59'	(Report)	20' Boaz; (yellow card) 43' Bio; (yellow card) 58' Kabes	Stadium: Agus Salim; Attendance: 7,000; Referee: Oki Dwi Putra Senjaya

30 September 2010 2	Pelita Jaya	0 – 5	Persipura	Karawang
15:25 WIB		(Report)	28', 68' Boaz; 38' Zah Rahan; 50' Hamka; 88' Luky	Stadium: Singaperbangsa Stadium; Attendance: 3,000; Referee: Setiyono

17 October 2010 3	Persipura	2 – 0	Putra Samarinda	Jayapura
15:30 WIT	Manu (yellow card) 21'; Kabes 38'; Boaz 43' (pen.)	(Report)		Stadium: Mandala Stadium; Attendance: 25,059; Referee: Djumadi Effendi

20 October 2010 4	Persipura	8 – 1	Bontang	Jayapura
15:30 WIT	Boaz 27', 78'; Tinus 30'; Rivai 40', 60'; Zah Rahan 43'; Ortiz (yellow card) 55'; Kabes 69'; Luky 88'	(Report)	(yellow card) 81' Iqbal; 84' Kenji	Stadium: Mandala Stadium; Attendance: 17,672; Referee: Retu Slamet Wijaya

24 October 2010 5	Persijap	1 – 3	Persipura	Jepara
15:25 WIB	Khanif (yellow card) 17'; Doni (yellow card) 26'; Guti (yellow card) 40'; Evaldo (yellow card) 60' (goal) 65' (pen.)	(Report)	(yellow card) 35' Manu; 51' Tibo; (yellow card) 56' (goal) 73', 81' Boaz; (yellow card) 61' Kabes	Stadium: Bumi Kartini; Attendance: 3,000; Referee: Jerry Elly

27 October 2010 --	Persibo	0 – 1	Persipura	Kediri
15:30 WIB	Sumardi (yellow card) 25'; Aang (yellow card) 48'; Cucu (yellow card) 52'; Paliama (yellow card) 88'	(Report)	(yellow card) 22' Ortiz; (yellow card) 72' (goal) 89' Boaz; (yellow card) 88' Zah Rahan	Stadium: Brawijaya Stadium; Attendance: 253; Referee: Ahmad Suparman

31 October 2010 6	Persipura	2 – 0	Deltras	Jayapura
15:30 WIT	Pangkali (yellow card) 47'; Bonsapia 80'; Bio 86'	(Report)	(yellow card) 34' Hesketh; (yellow card) 67' Chan-Young	Stadium: Mandala Stadium; Attendance: 19,692; Referee: Aeng Suarlan

3 November 2010 7	Persipura	3 – 0	Persela	Jayapura
15:30 WIT	Manu (yellow card) 16'; Kabes 35'; Pangkali (yellow card) 41'; Boaz 57'; Luky 72'	(Report)	(yellow card) 13' Mustafic	Stadium: Mandala Stadium; Attendance: 18,549; Referee: Iis Isya Permana

17 January 2011 8	Persipura	4 – 1	PSPS	Jayapura
15:30 WIT	Boaz 49', 89'; Kabes 59'; Zah Rahan 73'	(Report)	(yellow card) 44' Hyun Joon; 86' Nzekou; (yellow card) 89' Banaken	Stadium: Mandala Stadium; Attendance: 17,572; Referee: Jerry Elly

20 January 2011 9	Persipura	2 – 1	Persija	Jayapura
15:30 WIT	Boaz 83', 85'	(Report)	(yellow card) 55' (goal) 62' Greg; (yellow card) 71' Syamsul	Stadium: Mandala Stadium; Attendance: 19,863; Referee: Restu Slamet Wijaya

25 January 2011 10	Persipura	1 – 1	Persiwa	Jayapura
15:30 WIT	Pangkali (yellow card) 57'; Boaz 69'	(Report)	62' Erick; (yellow card) 72' Padwa	Stadium: Mandala Stadium; Attendance: 18,724; Referee: Suharto

30 January 2011 11	Persipura	3 – 2	Sriwijaya	Jayapura
15:30 WIT	Boaz 19' (pen.); Tinus 84'; Luky 87'	(Report)	41' Okto; (yellow card) 62' Thierry; 64' Rudi	Stadium: Mandala Stadium; Attendance: 25,000; Referee: Setiyono

2 February 2011 12	Persipura	5 – 1	Persib	Jayapura
15:30 WIT	Kabes 20', 65'; Boaz 27'; Zah Rahan 74'; Bonsapia 90'	(Report)	79' Atep	Stadium: Mandala Stadium; Attendance: 25,000; Referee: Armando Pribadi

6 February 2011 13	Arema	1 – 0	Persipura	Malang
19:00 WIB	Esteban (yellow card) 22'; Waluyo (yellow card) 48'; Sunarto 89'	(Report)	(yellow card) 66' Zah Rahan	Stadium: Kanjuruhan Stadium; Attendance: 36,994; Referee: Oki Dwi Putra Senjaya

12 February 2011 14	Persiba	1 – 0	Persipura	Balikpapan
20:00 WITA	Amri 11'; Amri (yellow card) 17'; Kim Yong-hee (yellow card) 30'; Dwi Joko (yellow card) 63'	(Report)	(yellow card) 82' Igbonefo	Stadium: Persiba Stadium; Attendance: 5,213; Referee: Armando Pribadi

7 March 2011 15	Persipura	6 – 1	Arema	Jayapura
15:30 WIT	Zah Rahan 15'; Boaz 60', 63', 87'; Luky (yellow card) 61'; Luky 78'; Tinus 81'	(Report)	9' Roman; (red card) 21' A.K	Stadium: Mandala Stadium; Attendance: 18,763; Referee: Mardi

10 March 2011 16	Persipura	1 – 0	Persijap	Jayapura
15:30 WIT	Tibo 21'; Bio Paulin (yellow card) 68'	(Report)		Stadium: Mandala Stadium; Attendance: 17,824; Referee: Olehadi

23 March 2011 17	Sriwijaya	0 – 0	Persipura	Palembang
15:25 WIT	Thierry (yellow card) 40'; Lim Joon-Sik (yellow card) 45'; Kim Yong-hee (yellow card) 73'	(Report)	(yellow card) 16' Pangkali; (yellow card) 41' Hamka; (yellow card) 73' Manu	Stadium: Gelora Sriwijaya Stadium; Attendance: 10,155; Referee: Shamsudin Bin Ibrahim (Malaysia)

27 March 2011 18	Persib	2 – 2	Persipura	Bandung
19:15 WIB	Airlangga 7'; Abanda Herman 43'; Maman (yellow card) 71'	(Report)	(yellow card) 12' Bio Paulin; (yellow card) 41' Ortiz; 75' Zah Rahan; 89' Tibo; (yellow card) 65' (yellow-red card) 90' Igbonefo	Stadium: Jalak Harupat Stadium; Attendance: 25,965; Referee: Muh. Zamzaidi .K (Malaysia)

31 March 2011 19	Persija	1 – 1	Persipura	Jakarta
15:25 WIB	M. Ilham (yellow card) 49'; Agu Casmir 86'; Agus Indra (yellow card) 90'	(Report)	48' Tibo; (yellow card) 90' Zah Rahan	Stadium: Bung Karno Stadium; Attendance: 13,355; Referee: Setiyono, SPD

8 April 2011 20	PSPS	1 – 2	Persipura	Padang
15:25 WIB	Putut 30'; Danil (yellow card) 38'	(Report)	70' Boaz; 76' Luky; (yellow card) 38' Tinus; (yellow card) 78' Kabes	Stadium: H. Agus Salim Stadium; Attendance: 2,345; Referee: Mulyadi

18 April 2011 21	Persipura	3 – 1	Persiba	Jayapura
15:30 WIT	Gerald 46'; Gerald (yellow card) 84'; Tibo 88'; Luky 90'	(Report)	50' Aldo; (yellow card) 66' Robertino; (yellow card) 83' Dadic	Stadium: Mandala Stadium; Attendance: 18,538; Referee: Djumadi Effendi

16 May 2011 22	Persiwa	1 – 1	Persipura	Wamena
19:30 WIT	Boakay Foday 31'; Habel Satya (yellow card) 34'	(Report)	(yellow card) 10' S. Bonsapia; (yellow card) 52' Ortizan; (yellow card) 82' Igbonefo; 90' Igbonefo	Stadium: Pendidikan Stadium; Attendance: 14,750; Referee: Armando Pribadi

31 May 2011 23	Persela	0 – 1	Persipura	Lamongan
15:30 WIB	J. Ichwan (yellow card) 52'; Z. Arifin (yellow card) 90'	(Report)	5' Tibo; (yellow card) 29' Mandowen; (yellow card) 41' Ferdiansyah	Stadium: Surajaya Stadium; Attendance: 10,015; Referee: Iis Isya Permana

4 June 2011 24	Deltras	1 – 1	Persipura	Sidoarjo
15:25 WIB	K. Mashuda (yellow card) 61'; Marcio 79'	(Report)	(yellow card) 51' Igbonefo; (yellow card) 57' Gerald; 70' Bio Paulin; (yellow card) 74' Bio Paulin; (yellow card) 89' Chris Uron	Stadium: Gelora Delta Stadium; Attendance: 3,000; Referee: Olehadi

8 June 2011 25	Persisam	1 – 2	Persipura	Samarinda
16:30 WITA	Fandy 22'; Gangga (yellow card) 60'; Joel Tsimi (yellow card) 85'	(Report)	34' Ortizan; 70' Tibo	Stadium: Segiri Stadium; Attendance: 14,353; Referee: Jerry Elly

11 June 2011 26	Bontang	1 – 1	Persipura	Bontang
19:30 WITA	Nyeck Nyobe 3'	(Report)	5' Boaz; (yellow card) 82' Ortizan	Stadium: Mulawarman Stadium; Attendance: 2,500; Referee: Setiyono, SPD

16 June 2011 27	Persipura	2 – 1	Pelita	Jayapura
15:30 WIT	Zah Rahan 2'; Boaz 76'	(Report)	(yellow card) 49' Egi Melgiansyah; 90' Juan Ramirez	Stadium: Mandala Stadium; Attendance: 17,373; Referee: Setiyono, SPD

19 June 2011 28	Persipura	1 – 1	Semen Padang	Jayapura
17:00 WIT	Tibo (yellow card) 38'; Kabes 57'	(Report)	(yellow card) 34' Yoo Hyun-Goo; (yellow card) 80' Vendry Mofu; 89' Vendry Mofu; (yellow card) 90' Edward Junior	Stadium: Mandala Stadium; Attendance: 24,582; Referee: Jimmy Napitupulu

Last updated: 20 June 2011
Source: Persipura Jayapura

=== All-Star Games ===
29 June 2011 All-Star	Persipura	2 – 1	ISL All-Star	Jayapura
17:30 WIT	Zah Rahan 39', 82'	Report	30' Muhammad Ridwan; (yellow card) 79' Muhammad Roby	Stadium: Mandala Stadium; Attendance: 24,895; Referee: Jimmy Napitupulu

Last updated: 29 June 2011
Source: Persipura Jayapura

=== AFC Cup ===
==== Group stage ====
Team	Pld	W	D	L	GF	GA	GD	Pts
(Thailand) Chonburi	6	4	1	1	18	8	+10	13
(Indonesia) Persipura Jayapura	6	3	2	1	14	9	+5	11
(Hong Kong) South China	6	1	2	3	7	14	−7	5
(India) Kingfisher East Bengal	6	0	3	3	9	17	−8	3

Source: RSSSF

2 March 2011 R1	South China (Hong Kong)	1 – 1	(Indonesia) Persipura	Hong Kong
20:00 HKT	Chan Siu Ki 59'	(Report)	39' Boaz Solossa; (yellow card) 72' Stevie Bonsapia; (yellow card) 88' Bio Paulin; (yellow card) 90+3' Yohanis Tjoe	Stadium: Hong Kong Stadium; Attendance: 9,558; Referee: (South Korea) Ko Hyung Jin

16 March 2011 R2	Persipura (Indonesia)	4 – 1	(India) East Bengal	Jakarta
17:30 WIB	Gerald Pangkali (yellow card) 13'; Titus Bonai 16'; Boaz Solossa 19'; Imanuel Wanggai (yellow card) 55'; Stevie Bonsapia 62'; Lukas Mandowen 90' (+3)	(Report)	22' Tolgay Özbey	Stadium: Gelora Bung Karno Stadium; Attendance: 700; Referee: (Vietnam) Vo Minh Tri

13 April 2011 R3	Persipura (Indonesia)	3 – 0	(Thailand) Chonburi	Jayapura
16:00 WIT	Yustinus Pae 9'; Titus Bonai 43'; Lukas Mandowen 83'; Yohanis Tjoe (yellow card) 38' (yellow-red card) 89'	(Report)		Stadium: Mandala Stadium; Attendance: 20,000; Referee: (Chinese Taipei) Yu Ming Hsun

26 April 2011 R4	Chonburi (Thailand)	4 – 1	(Indonesia) Persipura	Chonburi, Thailand
19:00 (UTC+7)	Suree Sukha 16'; Anucha Kitpongsri (yellow card) 27'; Pipob On-Mo 36', 72'; Therdsak Chaiman 42' (pen.); Suttinun Phukhom 54'	(Report)	(yellow card) 37' (yellow-red card) 59' Ortizan Solossa; (yellow card) 41' Titus Bonai; 75' Bio Paulin	Stadium: Chonburi PE Stadium; Attendance: 6,821; Referee: (Japan) Sato Ryuji

3 May 2011 R5	Persipura (Indonesia)	4 – 2	(Hong Kong) South China	Jayapura
16:00 WIT	Zah Rahan Krangar 23'; Boaz Solossa 44', 60' (pen.); Gerald Pangkali 77'; Lukas Mandowen (yellow card) 84'; Ian Louis Kabes (yellow card) 90+3'	(Report)	(yellow card) 31' Nicky Butt; 36' Xu Deshuai; (yellow card) 57' Li Haiqiang; 86' Ng Wai Chiu	Stadium: Mandala Stadium; Attendance: 15,000; Referee: (Malaysia) Mohd. Nafeez

10 May 2011 R6	East Bengal (India)	1 – 1	(Indonesia) Persipura	Kolkata, India
17:00 IST	Baljit Sahni 46'; Sushanth Mathew (yellow card) 61'; Ravinder Singh (yellow card) 67'; Syed Rahim Nabi (yellow card) 81'	(Report)	3' Titus Bonai	Stadium: Yuva Bharati Krirangan; Attendance: 400; Referee: (Kuwait) Ali Shaban

==== Knockout phase ====
Round of 16

25 May 2011 First leg	Song Lam Nghe An (Vietnam)	1 – 3	(Indonesia) Persipura	Vinh, Vietnam
16:00 ICT	Phan D.T. Thành Đạt (yellow card) 42'; Nguyễn Hồng Việt 58'	(Report)	28' Boaz Solossa; (yellow card) 31' Gerald Pangkali; 34' Titus Bonai; (yellow card) 39' Yohanis Tjoe; 85' Ortizan Solossa	Stadium: Vinh Stadium; Attendance: 5,000; Referee: (Lebanon) Andre Al Haddad

Quarter-finals

13 September 2011 First leg	Persipura (Indonesia)	–	(Iraq) Arbil	Jayapura, Indonesia
16:00 WIT				Stadium: Mandala Stadium

27 September 2011 Second leg	Arbil (Iraq)	–	(Indonesia) Persipura	Arbil, Iraq
18:30 UTC+03:00				Stadium: Franso Hariri Stadium

Updated to games played on 25 May 2011
Source: AFC Cup Schedule & Results

==== Indonesia Cup ====
Competition not held.

Last updated: 10 May 2011
Source: Persipura Jayapura

== See also ==
- 2011 AFC Cup
- 2010–11 Indonesia Super League
- 2011 Piala Indonesia
- 2011 Indonesia Super League All-Star Game
