= 2013 Persipura Jayapura season =

Persipura
2012–13 season
- Chairman: Rudi Maswi
- Manager: Jacksen F. Tiago
- Indonesia Super League: 1st
- Indonesian Inter Island Cup: Semi Final
- Top goalscorer: League: Boaz Solossa (13); All: Boaz Solossa (13)
- Highest home attendance: 41,792 vs Manchester City (25 November 2012, Premier League)
- Lowest home attendance: 28,817 vs Steaua Bucharest (14 March 2013, Europa League)
| Home colours | Away colours |

The 2012–13 season is Persipura's 5th Indonesia Super League (ISL) season in Indonesian football history. This is the third time they can get 1st in ISL League Table.

== Squads ==
=== First team squads ===
As of 27 October 2012.

Note: Flags indicate national team as defined under FIFA eligibility rules; some limited exceptions apply. Players may hold more than one non-FIFA nationality.

| No. | Pos. | Nation | Player |
|---|---|---|---|
| 1 | GK | KOR | Yo Jae-Hoon |
| 3 | DF | IDN | Fandry Imbiri |
| 4 | DF | IDN | Ricardo Salampessy |
| 5 | DF | BRA | Otávio Dutra (Vice captain) |
| 6 | MF | IDN | David Laly |
| 8 | MF | KOR | Lim Joon-Sik |
| 10 | MF | LBR | Zah Rahan Krangar |
| 11 | MF | IDN | Imanuel Wanggai |
| 12 | MF | IDN | Nelson Alom |
| 13 | MF | IDN | Ian Kabes |
| 14 | DF | IDN | Ruben Sanadi |
| 15 | MF | IDN | Gerald Pangkali |
| 16 | DF | IDN | Daniel Tata |
| 17 | FW | IDN | Yohanes "Feri" Pahabol |

| No. | Pos. | Nation | Player |
|---|---|---|---|
| 18 | FW | IDN | Ricky Kayame |
| 19 | FW | IDN | Yulianus Watora |
| 20 | GK | IDN | Ferdiansyah |
| 21 | MF | IDN | Yustinus Pae |
| 22 | MF | IDN | Victor Numberi |
| 26 | MF | IDN | Ortizan Solossa |
| 27 | GK | IDN | Philipus Basikbasik |
| 30 | GK | IDN | Nur Affandi |
| 32 | DF | IDN | Victor Pae |
| 33 | FW | IDN | Lukas Mandowen |
| 44 | DF | IDN | Yohanis Tjoe |
| 45 | DF | CMR | Bio Paulin |
| 86 | FW | IDN | Boaz Solossa (Captain) |
| 88 | FW | IDN | Patrich Wanggai |

== Transfers ==
=== In ===
| Squad # | Position | Player | Transferred From |
|---|---|---|---|
| 5 | DF | (Brazil) Otavio Dutra | (Brazil) Persebaya |
| 17 | MF | (Indonesia) Yohanes Ferinando Pahabol | (Indonesia) Persidafon |
| 88 | CF | (Indonesia) Patrich Wanggai | (Indonesia) Persidafon |

== Competitions ==
=== Indonesia Super League ===
==== Matches ====
| 13 January 2013 1 | Persib Bandung | 1–1 | Persipura Jayapura | Bandung, West Java |
| 16:30 WIB | Mbida Messi 90+1' | Report | Bio Paulin Pierre 23' | Stadium: Si Jalak Harupat Stadium; Attendance: 19,738; Referee: Mike Jones |

| 19 January 2013 2 | Persita Tangerang | 1–1 | Persipura Jayapura | Tangerang, Banten |
| 15:30 WIB | Kim Dong Chan 2' | Report | Boaz Solossa 14' | Stadium: Mashud Wisnusaputra Stadium |

| 31 January 2013 3 | Persipura Jayapura | 4–0 | Persepam Madura | Jayapura |
| 15:30 WIB | Patrich Wanggai 18'; Boaz Solossa 31', 52'; Lukas Mandowen 79' | | | Stadium: Mandala Stadium |

| 3 February 2013 4 | Persipura Jayapura | 2–0 | Persela Lamongan | Jayapura |
| 15:30 WIB | Boaz Solossa 1', 88' | Report | | Stadium: Mandala Stadium; Attendance: 23,852; Referee: Oki Dwi Putra |

| 10 February 2013 | Persipura Jayapura | 3–0 WO | Persiwa Wamena |

| 18 February 2013 | Persiram Raja Ampat | 1–1 | Persipura Jayapura | Sorong |
| 15:30 WIB | James Koko Lomel 32' | (http://www.goal.com/id-ID/match/98444/persiram-vs-persipura/ report) | Patrich Wanggai 15' | Stadium: Wombik Stadium; Attendance: 10,202; Referee: Thoriq Al Katiri |

| v |

| v |
