= 2009 Copa Indonesia final =

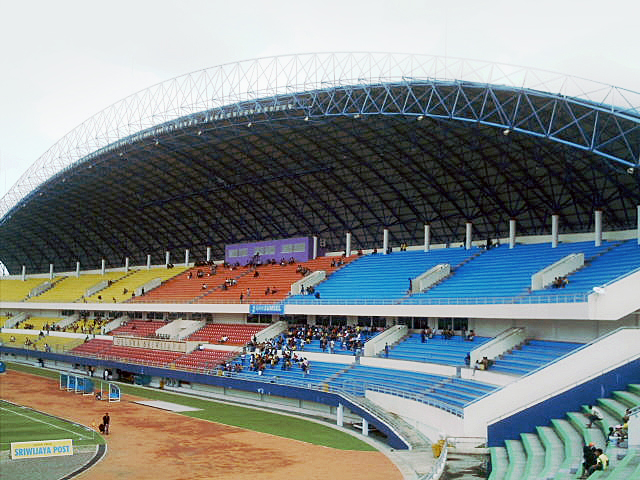
- The final was played at Jakabaring Stadium.
- Event: 2008–09 Copa Indonesia
| Persipura Jayapura | Sriwijaya FC |
| 0 | 4 |
- Date: 28 June 2009
- Venue: Jakabaring Stadium, Palembang
- Man of the Match: Anoure Obiora (Sriwijaya FC)
- Referee: Purwanto
- Attendance: 40,000
- Weather: Fine

The 2009 Copa Indonesia final was a football match that took place on 28 June 2009 at Jakabaring Stadium in Palembang. It was the fourth final of Piala Indonesia and contested by Sriwijaya FC and Persipura Jayapura. It was Sriwijaya's second consecutive final having won the title last year. For Persipura, this was their third successive final appearance having lost their previous two, including a penalty shootout defeat to Sriwijaya in their most recent final.

Persipura walked out of the match in the 60th minute to protest the officiating when Sriwijaya were leading 1–0. In the aftermath, Sriwijaya were awarded a 4–0 win and retained their title. As winners, they gained entry to the 2010 AFC Champions League qualifying play-off.

== Road to the final ==
Note: In all results below, the score of the finalist is given first (H: home; A: away).

| Persipura Jayapura | | | | Round | Sriwijaya FC | | | |
|---|---|---|---|---|---|---|---|---|
| Opponent | Agg. | 1st leg | 2nd leg | Round | Opponent | Agg. | 1st leg | 2nd leg |
| Persema Malang | 5–1 | 3–0 (H) | 2–1 (A) | Third round | Persib Bandung | 4–2 | 3–1 (H) | 1–1 (A) |
| PSMS Medan | 6–1 | 2–0 (A) | 4–1 (H) | Quarter-finals | Persibo Bojonegoro | 7–2 | 5–0 (H) | 2–2 (A) |
| Deltras Sidoarjo | 6–4 | 3–1 (H) | 3–3 (A) | Semi-finals | Persijap Jepara | 5–1 | 2–0 (A) | 3–1 (H) |

== Match details ==
28 June 2009
19:30 WIB

| Persipura Jayapura | 0–1 (awarded 0–4) | Sriwijaya FC |
|---|---|---|
| | Report | 51' Obiora |

Jakabaring Stadium, Palembang
Attendance: 40,000
Referee: Purwanto

| Persipura Jayapura | Sriwijaya FC |

Persipura Jayapura: 3-5-2
| GK | 1 | (Indonesia) Yandri Pitoy |
| CB | 14 | (Indonesia) Jack Komboy |
| CB | 32 | (Nigeria) Victor Igbonefo |
| CB | 45 | (Cameroon) Bio Paulin |
| RM | 4 | (Indonesia) Ricardo Salampessy |
| CM | 10 | (Indonesia) Eduard Ivakdalam (c) |
| CM | 11 | (Indonesia) Imanuel Wanggai | | (substituted off) 40' |
| CM | 13 | (Indonesia) Ian Kabes |
| LM | 6 | (Brazil) David da Rocha | (yellow card) 17' | (substituted off) 57' |
| CF | 12 | (Nigeria) Ernest Jeremiah | (red card) 60' |
| CF | 86 | (Indonesia) Boaz Solossa |
Substitutes:
| GK | 20 | (Indonesia) Ferdiansyah |
| DF | 5 | (Indonesia) Ardiles Rumbiak |
| DF | 15 | (Indonesia) Gerald Pangkali | | (substituted in) 40' |
| MF | 7 | (Indonesia) Stevie Bonsapia | | (substituted in) 57' |
| MF | 23 | (Indonesia) Heru Nerly |
| MF | 31 | (Indonesia) Paulo Rumere |
| FW | 21 | (Indonesia) Yustinus Pae |
Manager:
(Brazil) Jacksen F. Tiago

Sriwijaya FC: 3-4-3
| GK | 12 | (Indonesia) Ferry Rotinsulu |
| CB | 4 | (Indonesia) Charis Yulianto (c) |
| CB | 13 | (Cameroon) Jacques Joel Tsimi |
| CB | 19 | (Indonesia) Ambrizal |
| RM | 24 | (Indonesia) Christian Warobay | (yellow card) 17' |
| CM | 6 | (Indonesia) Tony Sucipto | (yellow card) 44' |
| CM | 10 | (Liberia) Zah Rahan Krangar |
| LM | 7 | (Indonesia) Mohammad Nasuha | (yellow card) 4' |
| CF | 8 | (Cameroon) Ngon A Djam |
| CF | 9 | (Nigeria) Anoure Obiora |
| CF | 17 | (Saint Kitts and Nevis) Keith Gumbs | (yellow card) 30' |
Substitutes:
| GK | 23 | (Indonesia) Dede Sulaiman |
| DF | 15 | (Indonesia) Mohammad Mauly Lessy |
| DF | 22 | (Indonesia) Slamet Riyadi |
| MF | 16 | (Indonesia) Benben Barlian |
| MF | 18 | (Indonesia) Oktavianus |
| MF | 29 | (Indonesia) Wijay |
| FW | 5 | (Indonesia) Budi Sudarsono |
Manager:
(Indonesia) Rahmad Darmawan

Man of the Match:
(Nigeria) Anoure Obiora (Sriwijaya FC)

== See also ==
- 2009 Copa Indonesia
