= 2011 Indonesia Super League All-Star Game =

- Event: 2010–11 Indonesia Super League
Persipura Jayapura	ISL All-Star team
(Indonesia)	(Indonesia)
2	1
- Date: 29 June 2011
- Venue: Mandala Stadium, Jayapura, Papua, Indonesia
- Man of the Match: Zah Rahan Krangar (Persipura)
- Referee: Jimmy Napitupulu (Indonesia)
- Attendance: 34,895
- Weather: Sunny

2011 Indonesia Super League All-Star Game (in Indonesian: ISL Perang Bintang 2011) is the annual football All-star game in Indonesia, which was held shortly after the end of 2010–11 Indonesia Super League. This is the closing event for the Indonesia Super League's 2010–11 season.

Football fans can vote for the players to be included in the ISL All-Star team. The other spot will be automatically taken by the 2010–11 Indonesia Super League champions, Persipura Jayapura. Obviously, the ISL All-star team will not be composed of any player from Persipura.

The 2010–11 season's MVP award and top-scorer award (both given to Boaz Solossa) and the ISL Champions' trophy (to Persipura Jayapura) were awarded by PSSI (Indonesia's FA) during a ceremony after the All-Star game.

== ISL All-Star squad ==
=== Staff ===
- Head coach : (Indonesia) Nil Maizar (Semen Padang)

=== Players ===
No.	Pos.	Player	Date of birth (age)	Caps	Goals	Club
1	GK	(Indonesia) Kurnia Meiga Hermansyah	May 7, 1990 (age 35)			(Indonesia) Arema FC
12	GK	(Indonesia) Ferry Rotinsulu	December 28, 1982 (age 42)			(Indonesia) Sriwijaya FC
5	DF	(Cameroon) David Ngan Pagbe	October 18, 1978 (age 46)			(Indonesia) Semen Padang FC
6	DF	(Brazil) Claudiano Alves dos Santos	October 7, 1981 (age 43)			(Indonesia) Sriwijaya FC
13	DF	(Indonesia) Gunawan Dwi Cahyo	April 20, 1989 (age 36)			(Indonesia) Sriwijaya FC
14	DF	(Indonesia) Wahyu Wiji Astanto	May 31, 1986 (age 39)			(Indonesia) Persiba Bantul
16	DF	(Indonesia) Muhammad Roby	September 12, 1985 (age 39)			(Indonesia) Persisam Putra Samarinda
32	DF	(Indonesia) Edi Hafid Murtado	March 21, 1983 (age 42)			(Indonesia) Pelita Jaya FC
2	MF	(Indonesia) Mohammad Nasuha	September 15, 1984 (age 40)			(Indonesia) Persija Jakarta
3	MF	(Indonesia) Zulkifli Syukur	May 3, 1984 (age 41)			(Indonesia) Arema FC
19	MF	(Indonesia) Ahmad Bustomi	June 13, 1985 (age 39)			(Indonesia) Arema FC
23	MF	(Indonesia) Muhammad Ridwan	July 8, 1980 (age 44)			(Indonesia) Sriwijaya FC
28	MF	(Uruguay) Ronald Fagundez	May 12, 1979 (age 46)			(Indonesia) Persisam Putra Samarinda
58	MF	(Montenegro) Miljan Radovic	October 18, 1975 (age 49)			(Indonesia) Persib Bandung
7	FW	(Indonesia) Yongki Aribowo	November 23, 1989 (age 35)			(Indonesia) Arema FC
17	FW	(Paraguay) Francisco Aldo Barreto	March 1, 1981 (age 44)			(Indonesia) Persiba Balikpapan
20	FW	(Indonesia) Bambang Pamungkas (Captain)	June 10, 1980 (age 45)			(Indonesia) Persija Jakarta
99	FW	(Indonesia) Cristian Gonzáles	August 30, 1976 (age 48)			(Indonesia) Persib Bandung

== ISL All-Star game ==
29 June 2011
17:30 WIT

Persipura Jayapura	2 – 1	ISL All-Star team
Zah Rahan 39', 83'	Report	30' M. Ridwan

Mandala Stadium, Jayapura, Papua
Attendance: 34,895
Referee: Jimmy Napitupulu (Indonesia)

Persipura Jayapura: 3-4-3
GK	1	(South Korea) Yoo Jae-Hoon
CB	44	(Indonesia) Yohanis Tjoe	(substituted off) 77'
CB	32	(Nigeria) Victor Igbonefo
CB	45	(Cameroon) Bio Paulin
RWB	21	(Indonesia) Yustinus Pae	(substituted off) 68'
CM	13	(Indonesia) Ian Louis Kabes
CM	15	(Indonesia) Gerald Pangkali
LWB	26	(Indonesia) Ortizan Solossa	(substituted off) 86'
AM	10	(Liberia) Zah Rahan Krangar
SS	86	(Indonesia) Boaz Solossa (C)
CF	25	(Indonesia) Titus Bonai	(substituted off) 63'
Substitutes
GK	20	(Indonesia) Ferdiansyah
DF	5	(Indonesia) Steven Hendambo
MF	6	(Indonesia) David Laly	(substituted in) 86'
MF	7	(Indonesia) Stevie Bonsapia	(substituted in) 63'
MF	8	(Indonesia) David Uron	(substituted in) 77'
FW	14	(Indonesia) Moses Banggo
FW	33	(Indonesia) Lukas Mandowen	(substituted in) 68'
Head coach
(Brazil) Jacksen F. Tiago

ISL All-Star team: 4-3-1-2
GK	12	(Indonesia) Ferry Rotinsulu		(substituted off) 43'
CB	5	(Cameroon) David Pagbe
CB	6	(Brazil) Claudiano Alves		(substituted off) 66'
LB	2	(Indonesia) Mohammad Nasuha		(substituted off) 80'
RB	3	(Indonesia) Zulkifli Syukur (C)		(substituted off) 44'
RM	23	(Indonesia) Muhammad Ridwan		(substituted off) 88'
CM	19	(Indonesia) Ahmad Bustomi
LM	28	(Uruguay) Ronald Fagundez		(substituted off) 64'
AM	58	(Montenegro) Miljan Radovic
CF	17	(Paraguay) Aldo Baretto
CF	99	(Indonesia) Cristian Gonzáles		(substituted off) 39'
Substitutes
GK	1	(Indonesia) Kurnia Meiga		(substituted in) 43'
FW	7	(Indonesia) Yongki Aribowo		(substituted in) 64'
DF	13	(Indonesia) Gunawan Dwi Cahyo		(substituted in) 88'
DF	14	(Indonesia) Wahyu Wiji Astanto		(substituted in) 66'
DF	16	(Indonesia) Muhammad Roby	(yellow card) 79'	(substituted in) 44'
FW	20	(Indonesia) Bambang Pamungkas		(substituted in) 39'
DF	32	(Indonesia) Edi Hafid Murtado		(substituted in) 80'
Head coach
(Indonesia) Nil Maizar

Perang Bintang Man of the Match:
(Liberia) Zah Rahan Krangar (Persipura Jayapura)

Referee:
Jimmy Napitupulu (Indonesia)

Assistant referees:
Jaka Mulyono Ama (Indonesia)
Dadang Sutisna (Indonesia)

Reserve official:
Setiyono (Indonesia)

== See also ==
- 2010–11 Indonesia Super League
