= 2008 Copa Indonesia final =

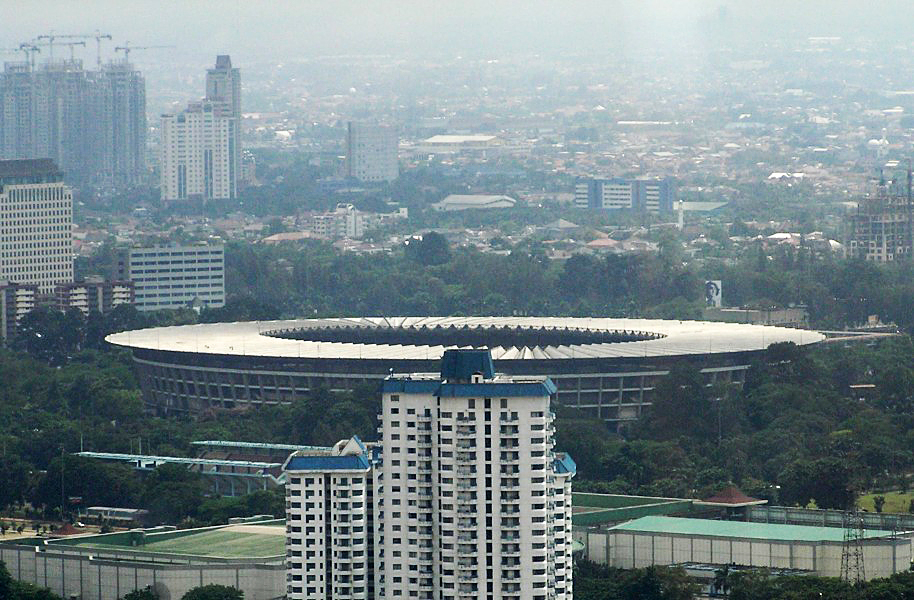
- Gelora Bung Karno Stadium hosted the final for the second time.
- Event: 2007–08 Copa Indonesia
Persipura Jayapura	Sriwijaya FC
1	1
- After extra time Sriwijaya won 3–0 on penalties
- Date: 13 January 2008
- Venue: Gelora Bung Karno Stadium, Jakarta
- Man of the Match: Ferry Rotinsulu (Sriwijaya FC)
- Referee: Jimmy Napitupulu
- Attendance: 25,000
- Weather: Fine

The 2008 Copa Indonesia final was a football match that took place on 13 January 2008 at Gelora Bung Karno Stadium in Jakarta. It was the third final of Piala Indonesia and contested by Sriwijaya FC and Persipura Jayapura. It was a first-ever final appearance for Sriwijaya, while Persipura made it back-to-back final appearances after losing to Arema in the previous edition.

Sriwijaya won the title via a penalty shoot-out after the match ended 1–1 in extra time. As winners, Sriwijaya entered the qualifying play-off of the 2009 AFC Champions League.

== Road to the final ==
Note: In all results below, the score of the finalist is given first (H: home; A: away).

Persipura Jayapura				Round	Sriwijaya FC			
Opponent	Agg.	1st leg	2nd leg	Round	Opponent	Agg.	1st leg	2nd leg
Persido Donggala	11–1	7–0 (H)	4–1 (A)	First round	PS Palembang	5–4	3–3 (H)	2–1 (A)
Persidafon Dafonsoro	2–0	0–0 (A)	2–0 (H)	Second round	PSSB Bireuen	4–0	0–0 (A)	4–0 (H)
Persemalra Maluku Tenggara	5–1	4–0 (H)	1–1 (A)	Third round	Perseman Manokwari	5–1	2–1 (A)	3–0 (w/o) (H)
Persekabpas Pasuruan	5–2	2–2 (A)	3–0 (H)	Quarter-finals	PSMS Medan	4–2	0–2 (A)	4–0 (a.e.t) (H)
Persija Jakarta	3–2 (H)			Semi-finals	Pelita Jaya	0–0 (6–5 pen.) (A)		

== Match details ==
13 January 2008
19:30 WIB

Persipura Jayapura	1–1 (a.e.t.)	Sriwijaya FC
Jeremiah 6'	Report	Gumbs 73'
Penalties
Ivakdalam (penalty missed) da Rocha (penalty missed); Beto (penalty missed)	0–3	(penalty scored) Gumbs; (penalty scored) Zah; (penalty missed) Tony; (penalty scored) Obiora

Gelora Bung Karno Stadium, Jakarta
Attendance: 25,000
Referee: Jimmy Napitupulu

Persipura Jayapura
Sriwijaya FC

Persipura Jayapura: 3-5-2
GK	1	(Indonesia) Yandri Pitoy
DF	4	(Indonesia) Ricardo Salampessy
DF	14	(Indonesia) Jack Komboy
DF	45	(Cameroon) Bio Paulin
MF	7	(Indonesia) Stevie Bonsapia	(substituted off) 38'
MF	10	(Indonesia) Eduard Ivakdalam (c)
MF	23	(Indonesia) Heru Nerly	(substituted off) 59'
MF	31	(Indonesia) Paulo Rumere
MF	32	(Nigeria) Victor Igbonefo
FW	12	(Nigeria) Ernest Jeremiah
FW	9	(Brazil) Beto Gonçalves
Substitutes:
GK	20	(Indonesia) Ferdiansyah
DF	15	(Indonesia) Gerald Pangkali
MF	6	(Brazil) David da Rocha	(substituted on) 59'
MF	11	(Indonesia) Imanuel Wanggai	(substituted on) 38'	(substituted off) 82'
MF	13	(Indonesia) Ian Kabes
MF	16	(Indonesia) Murzal Usman	(substituted on) 82'
FW	21	(Indonesia) Yustinus Pae
Manager:
(Malaysia) Raja Isa

Sriwijaya FC: 4-2-3-1
GK	12	(Indonesia) Ferry Rotinsulu
DF	19	(Indonesia) Ambrizal
DF	24	(Indonesia) Christian Warobay
DF	25	(Indonesia) Isnan Ali	(substituted off) 98'
DF	31	(Brazil) Renato Elias (c)
MF	9	(Nigeria) Anoure Obiora
MF	10	(Liberia) Zah Rahan Krangar
MF	16	(Indonesia) Benben Barlian	(substituted off) 114'
MF	22	(Indonesia) Slamet Riyadi
MF	29	(Indonesia) Wijay
FW	17	(Saint Kitts and Nevis) Keith Gumbs
Substitutes:
GK	23	(Indonesia) Dede Sulaiman
DF	13	(Indonesia) Dian Fachrudin	(substituted on) 98'
DF	15	(Indonesia) Mohammad Mauly Lessy
MF	6	(Indonesia) Tony Sucipto	(substituted on) 114'
MF	18	(Indonesia) Oktavianus
Manager:
(Indonesia) Rahmad Darmawan

Man of the Match:
(Indonesia) Ferry Rotinsulu (Sriwijaya FC)

== See also ==
- 2007–08 Copa Indonesia
