= 2014 Indonesia Super League final =

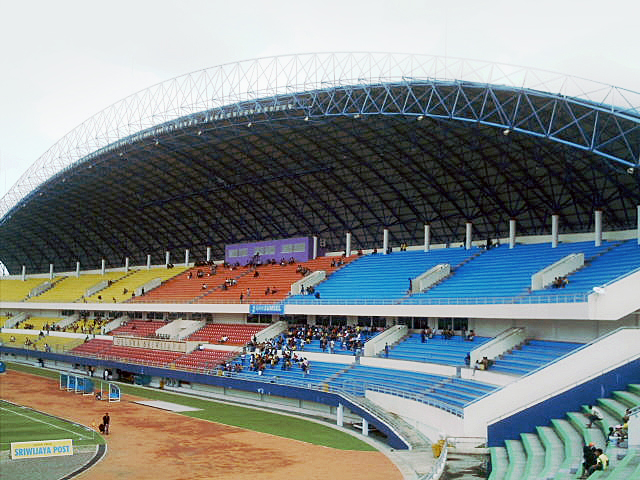
- The final was played at Jakabaring Stadium.
- Event: 2014 Indonesia Super League
Persipura Jayapura	Persib Bandung
2	2
- After extra time Persib won 5-3 on penalties
- Date: 7 November 2014
- Venue: Jakabaring Stadium, Palembang
- Man of the Match: Firman Utina
- Referee: Prasetyo Hadi
- Attendance: 30,165
- Weather: Partly cloudy 28 °C; 83% humidity

The 2014 Indonesia Super League final was the final match of the 2014 Indonesia Super League which took place on 7 November 2014 at Jakabaring Stadium in Palembang and was contested by Persipura and Persib. Persib won the match 5–3 on penalties, following a 2–2 draw after extra time, for their first Indonesia Super League title.

== Background ==
Persipura had won four top-flight league titles with one Indonesian Premier Division in 2005 and three Indonesia Super League in 2008-09, 10-11, and 2013. Furthermore, aside from the 2006 season in which they only finished 8th in the eastern zone standings, Persipura managed to always finish in the top-3 of the national classification.

In contrary, Persib had never won the championship since the 1994-95 season. The only time they had been close enough to the title is in the 2008–09 season in which they finished third.

Both teams had experienced playing in the venue of Gelora Sriwijaya Stadium, mainly when they played away against Sriwijaya F.C. Persipura, particularly, had an incident here against the home team in the 2009 Copa Indonesia final, where Persipura lost 0-4 on walkover after the match was abandoned at 0-1 due to a loud protest against the referee who did not award a penalty to the Mutiara Hitam team following a handball from a Sriwijaya player.

== Venue ==
The final was originally planned to be held at Gelora Bung Karno Stadium in Jakarta. After the semi-finals were moved, PT Liga decided to move the final as well.

The reasons for moving the location of the final were because the distance between the semi-finals and final was not too long and permission from the police was not available. The latter condition also happened in the semi-finals.

PT Liga Indonesia established the Gelora Sriwijaya Stadium as the venue for the 2014 Indonesia Super League (ISL) semifinals on 4 November 2014 and final on 7 November 2014. The final match was previously planned to be held at the Gelora Bung Karno Main Stadium, Jakarta. However, after considering security, PT Liga Indonesia determined that the match would still be held in Palembang.

== Road to the final ==
Note: In all results below, the score of the finalist is given first (H: home; A: away).

Persipura		Round	Persib	
Main article: 2014 Indonesia Super League first round: East: Pos / Team / Pld / Pts; 1 / Persebaya ISL (Bhayangkara) / 20 / 43; **2** / Persipura / **20** / 39; 3 / Mitra Kukar / 20 / 37; 4 / Persela / 20 / 28; 5 / Persiba / 20 / 25; 6 / Putra Samarinda / 20 / 25; 7 / PSM / 20 / 25; 8 / Perseru / 20 / 23; 9 / Persiram Raja Ampat / 20 / 23; 10 / Persepam MU (R) / 20 / 23; 11 / Persiba Bantul (R) / 20 / 9; Source: Soccerway and Liga Indonesia (R) Relegated		**First round**	Main article: 2014 Indonesia Super League first round:West: Pos / Team / Pld / Pts; 1 / Arema Cronus / 20 / 46; **2** / Persib / **20** / 41; 3 / Semen Padang / 20 / 38; 4 / Pelita Bandung Raya / 20 / 35; 5 / Persija / 20 / 34; 6 / Sriwijaya / 20 / 23; 7 / Barito Putera / 20 / 22; 8 / Persik Kediri / 20 / 21; 9 / Persegres / 20 / 21; 10 / Persita (R) / 20 / 15; 11 / Persijap Jepara (R) / 20 / 8; Source: Soccerway and Liga Indonesia (R) Relegated	
Main article: 2014 Indonesia Super League second round: Group A: Pos / Team / Pld / Pts; **1** / Persipura / **6** / **12**; 2 / Arema / 6 / **11**; 3 / Semen Padang / 6 / **10**; 4 / Persela / 6 / **1**; Source: Soccerway		**Second round**	Main article: 2014 Indonesia Super League second round: Group B: Pos / Team / Pld / Pts; **1** / Persib / **6** / **13**; 2 / Pelita Bandung Raya / 6 / **8**; 3 / Mitra Kukar / 6 / **5**; 4 / Persebaya ISL (Bhayangkara) / 6 / **5**; Source: Soccerway	
Opponent	Result	**Knockout stage**	Opponent	Result
Pelita Bandung Raya	2–0 (H)	Semi-finals	Arema Cronus	3–1 (a.e.t.) (H)

=== Persipura ===
Hailing from the eastern zone, Persipura collected 39 points as a result of 10 wins, 9 draws, and a single lose in the first round. This put them in second place below Persebaya ISL and securing a spot in the second round.

Placed into Group A of the final eight round, Persipura topped the table with 12 points from four wins and two losses. The Mutiara Hitam advanced to the semifinals to challenge the runner-up of Group B, Pelita Bandung Raya (PBR).

Persipura sealed the finalist spot by defeating PBR two goals to nothing, both scored by Boaz Solossa respectively in the 68th and 71st minute.

=== Persib ===
Similar to Persipura, Persib also advanced from the first round after finishing second in the western zone table below Arema. They amassed 41 points from 12 wins, 5 draws, and 3 losses.

The similarity continues onto the second round as Persib also stood on top of Group B, scoring 13 points from 4 wins, 1 draw, and 1 loss.

In the semifinals, Persib faced their fellow western team Arema once again, who became the runner-up of Group A. However, unlike Persipura's cruising victory, Persib had a hard time after being conceded a goal from Beto Gonçalves in the 46th minute. Fortunately, Vladimir Vujović came to save the team with an equalizer in the 84th minute, forcing an extra time. Persib managed to make a comeback after Atep scored a goal just seconds into the first half of the overtime. Their advancement to the championship match was secured with a third goal by Makan Konaté in the 112th minute.

=== Previous finals ===
Team	Previous final appearances (bold indicates winners)
Persipura	1 (**2005**)
Persib	1 (**1995**)

== Match ==
=== Summary ===
==== First half ====
Persipura kicked off the match and quickly started an offensive initiative. As a result, Persipura opened the scoring relatively early in the 5th minute. Ian Kabes received a through pass from Gerald Pangkali, successfully passing two Persib defenders and struck a strong grounder finisher to the far low corner of the net guarded by I Made Wirawan.

Having a goal up, Persipura consistently played attacking football and managed to create more chances. However, their momentum disrupted by the stoppage time. Persipura were down to 10 men after Bio Paulin mislaunched his tackle to Ferdinand Sinaga just outside the penalty box. Referee Prasetyo Hadi showed Paulin his second yellow card to send him off to the dressing room.

The resulting free kick for Persib, taken by Firman Utina made a wicky deflection off the crossbar, resulting scrimmages which ended after Achmad Jufriyanto's bicycle kick, being punched out by keeper Dede Sulaiman instead deflected back off Imanuel Wanggai causing an own goal.

The play concludes the first half tied at one goal each.

==== Second half ====
As soon as they kick off the second half, Persib started a high intensity attack into Persipura defenses.

In the 53rd minute, Utina sent a through pass to Muhammad Ridwan who lurked through an offside trap. Unmarked, Ridwan pushed the ball through the near post, inside the goal to turn the game around.

Persib attempted to slow down the tempo after taking the lead. This led to Persipura applying a more pressuring approach, thus producing several dangerous attempts on Wirawan's goal. Furthermore, Persipura subbed off midfielder Kabes, in favor of a forward, Yohanes Pahabol in the 69th minute.

The substitution proved fruitful in the 80th minute when Pahabol made a run through the left side of Persib defenders, pushed the ball to Robertino Pugliara, who then forwarded it to captain Boaz Solossa standing right in front of the goal. He scored an easy goal to equalize the game back at two apiece.

Stunned, Persib recovered their offensive strategy, but no more goals scored for the remainder of the half. The match was forced into extra time.

==== Extra time ====
Persib continued their attacks as the extra time kicks off, while Persipura played more defensively with occasional counter attacks. The first half ended rather uneventful.

In the 110th minute, Persib had Vladimir Vujović sent off by the referee after receiving a second yellow card following a disruption to Persipura goalkeeper Sulaiman's possession of the ball on his hands.

With both sides playing with 10 men, neither managed to score the winning goal. The game was to be decided by penalty shoot-out.

==== Penalty shoot-out ====
Since the merger of Perserikatan and Galatama to establish the Indonesian Premier Division in 1995 and the formation of the professional top-flight Indonesia Super League in 2008, no final matches had ended in penalty shoot-out. Thus, this is the first occurrence of the penalties to decide the championship.

Starting with Makan Konaté of Persib, seven successive penalties were taken successfully to set the score at 4-3 for the Bandung side. However, the streak ended as Nelson Alom's attempt had been blocked by Made Wirawan.

Stepping to be the decider, Jufriyanto shot his ball to the left side of the goal while sending goalkeeper Sulaiman to the wrong way. Persib secured their second top-flight championship after last time winning it in the 1994–95 Liga Indonesia Premier Division, ending the 19-year wait.

=== Details ===
7 November 2014
18:30 UTC+7

Persipura Jayapura	2–2 (a.e.t.)	Persib Bandung
Kabes 5'; Boaz 79'	Report (Liga Indonesia); Report (Solopos)	Wanggai 45+1' (o.g.); Ridwan 52'
Penalties
Boaz (penalty scored); Pahabol (penalty scored); Pugliara (penalty scored); Alom (penalty missed)	3–5	(penalty scored) Konaté; (penalty scored) Sinaga; (penalty scored) Tony; (penalty scored) Supardi; (penalty scored) Jufriyanto

Gelora Sriwijaya Stadium, Palembang
Attendance: 30,165
Referee: Prasetyo Hadi

Persipura	Persib

GK	27	(Indonesia) Dede Sulaiman
RB	8	(South Korea) Lim Joon-sik	(yellow card) 7'
CB	31	(Indonesia) Dominggus Fakdawer	(yellow card) 41'
CB	45	(Cameroon) Bio Paulin	(yellow card) 21' (yellow-red card) 45+2'
LB	14	(Indonesia) Ruben Sanadi
DM	13	(Indonesia) Ian Kabes		(substituted off) 69'
RM	15	(Indonesia) Gerald Pangkali		(substituted off) 62'
LM	11	(Indonesia) Imanuel Wanggai		(substituted off) 95'
AM	10	(Argentina) Robertino Pugliara
CF	21	(Indonesia) Yustinus Pae
CF	86	(Indonesia) Boaz Solossa (c)	(yellow card) 34'
Substitutions:
MF	49	(Indonesia) Jaelani Arey		(substituted on) 62'
MF	12	(Indonesia) Nelson Alom		(substituted on) 95'
FW	17	(Indonesia) Yohanes Pahabol		(substituted on) 69'
Assistant coach:
(Indonesia) Metu Duaramuri (Note: Persipura's assistant coach, Metu Duaramuri, took charge instead of head coach Jacksen F. Tiago.)

Starting IX

GK	78	(Indonesia) I Made Wirawan
RB	22	(Indonesia) Supardi	(yellow card) 99'
CB	16	(Indonesia) Achmad Jufriyanto	(yellow card) 27'
CB	3	(Montenegro) Vladimir Vujović	(yellow card) 45+2' (yellow-red card) 110'
LB	6	(Indonesia) Tony Sucipto
DM	24	(Indonesia) Hariono	(yellow card) 10'
RM	23	(Indonesia) Muhammad Ridwan
CM	15	(Indonesia) Firman Utina (c)
CM	10	(Mali) Makan Konaté
LM	82	(Indonesia) Tantan		(substituted off) 66'
CF	17	(Indonesia) Ferdinand Sinaga
Substitutions:
FW	7	(Indonesia) Atep		(substituted on) 66'
Manager:
(Indonesia) Djadjang Nurdjaman

Man of the Match:
Firman Utina

Assistant referees:
Beni Andriko
Muhammad Samsuri
Fourth official:
Handri Kristanto

Match rules

- 90 minutes.
- 30 minutes of extra time if necessary.
- Penalty shoot-out if scores still level.
- Seven named substitutes, of which up to three may be used.

== Post-match ==
Persib's victory ended their title draught of 19 years since winning the inaugural season of the league in 1994-95. It also marked the return of the title to Bandung since the success of Bandung Raya in the 1995-96 season.

During the awarding ceremony, the players and officials of Persib received their medals alongside then-governor of West Java, Ahmad Heryawan and then-mayor of Bandung, Ridwan Kamil. Team senior, Atep received the trophy from the Minister of Youth and Sports Affairs, Imam Nahrawi. Atep then lifted the trophy together with Firman Utina and team manager, Umuh Muchtar. In addition to the title, Persib's striker Ferdinand Sinaga was awarded as the Most Valuable Player of the season.

Meanwhile for Persipura, the loss marked another failure in their attempt to retain the title. Particularly during the Indonesia Super League era, in all three seasons following Persipura's victory (2009-10, 2011-12, and 2014), they would always finish as the runner-up.

After being postponed for a year, the final of the 2014 Indonesian Inter Island Cup was held again at Jakabaring Stadium, with Persib Bandung finishing as runners-up after a 1–2 defeat to Arema Cronus in extra time.

As the 2015 Indonesia Super League was discontinued due to a ban from the government and the sanction to PSSI by FIFA, there was no football competition until the 2015 Indonesia President's Cup in which Persib became champions, while Persipura was absent.

Both teams returned to compete in the 2015-16 General Sudirman Cup, 2016 Bhayangkara Cup, and the 2016 Indonesia Soccer Championship A. In the latter, Persipura ended up winning the season while Persib finished in fifth.

Since the league reinstated as Liga 1 in 2017, Persib had won another title in the 2023–24 season, coincidentally also applying a championship series format. Meanwhile, Persipura was playing in the second level, Liga 2 after being relegated in the 2021–22 Liga 1.
