= 2009 Indonesian Community Shield =

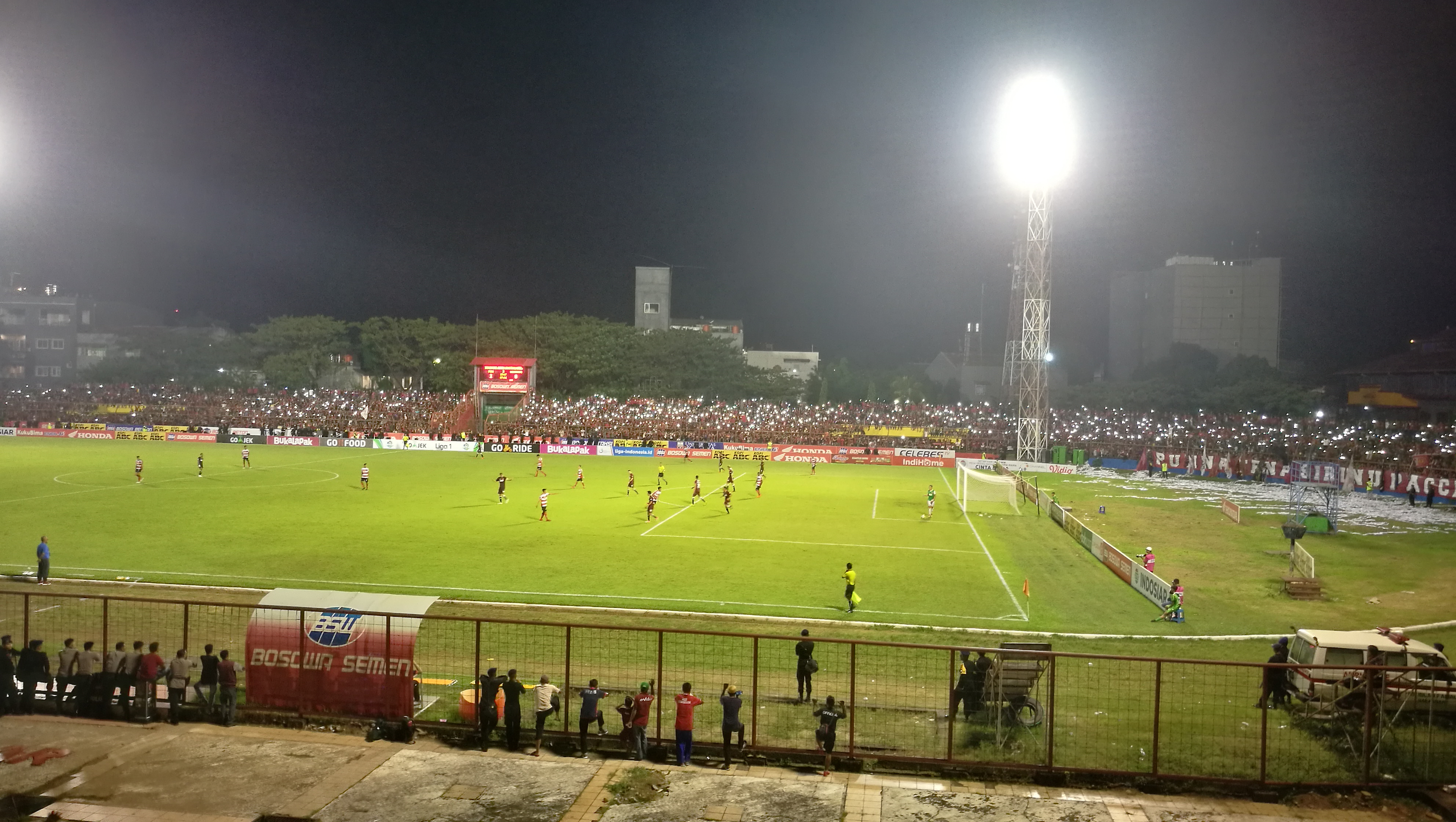
- The match was played at Andi Mattalatta Stadium.
Persipura Jayapura	Sriwijaya FC
3	1
- Date: 7 October 2009
- Venue: Andi Mattalatta Stadium, Makassar
- Referee: Aeng Suarlan

The 2009 Indonesian Community Shield was the inaugural edition of the Indonesian Community Shield. It was a match played by the 2008-09 Indonesia Super League winners Persipura Jayapura and 2008-09 Copa Indonesia winners Sriwijaya FC. It took place on 7 October 2009 at the Andi Mattalatta Stadium in Makassar, Indonesia. Persipura won the match 3–1.

== Match details ==
7 October 2009
19:15 WIB

Persipura Jayapura	3–1	Sriwijaya FC
Boaz 60', 84'; Yustinus 66'	Report	Gumbs 73'

Andi Mattalatta Stadium, Makassar
Referee: Aeng Suarlan

Persipura Jayapura	Sriwijaya FC

Persipura Jayapura:
GK	77	(Indonesia) Yandri Pitoy
RWB	22	(Indonesia) Hendra Ridwan		(substituted off) 45'
CB	45	(Cameroon) Bio Paulin	(yellow card) 38'
CB	14	(Indonesia) Jack Komboy	(yellow card) 16'
CB	32	(Nigeria) Victor Igbonefo
LWB	26	(Indonesia) Ortizan Solossa		(substituted off) 71'
DM	15	(Indonesia) Gerald Pangkali		(substituted off) 89'
CM	10	(Indonesia) Eduard Ivakdalam (c)
RW	86	(Indonesia) Boaz Solossa
CF	9	(Brazil) Beto Gonçalves
LW	21	(Indonesia) Yustinus Pae
Substitutes:
DF	4	(Indonesia) Ricardo Salampessy		(substituted in) 45'
MF	6	(Indonesia) David Laly		(substituted in) 89'
MF	13	(Indonesia) Ian Kabes		(substituted in) 71'
Manager:
(Brazil) Jacksen F. Tiago

Sriwijaya FC:
GK	1	(Indonesia) Hendro Kartiko
RB	24	(Indonesia) Christian Warobay	(substituted off) 71'
CB	5	(Indonesia) Bobby Satria
CB	26	(Indonesia) A A Ngurah Wahyu Trisnajaya
LB	3	(Indonesia) Slamet Riyadi
DM	11	(Indonesia) Ponaryo Astaman
RM	7	(Indonesia) Mohammad Nasuha
LM	18	(Indonesia) Oktavianus	(substituted off) 77'
AM	10	(Liberia) Zah Rahan Krangar
CF	8	(Indonesia) Rahmat Rivai	(substituted off) 87'
CF	17	(Saint Kitts and Nevis) Keith Gumbs
Substitutes:
MF	14	(Indonesia) Arif Suyono	(substituted in) 71'
MF	28	(Indonesia) Sulaiman Alamsyah Nasution	(substituted in) 77'
FW	27	(Indonesia) Mustopa Aji	(substituted in) 87'
Manager:
(Indonesia) Rahmad Darmawan
