= 2010–11 in Indonesian football =

Number of Friendlies played by the Indonesian football team

Football in Indonesia
- Season: 2010–11

During the 2010–11 season in Indonesian football, the national team played a number of friendlies and embarked on the qualifying rounds for the 2014 World Cup, defeating Turkmenistan in the second round in July 2011. National youth teams also played in several international championships.

The top-tier national league, the Indonesia Super League, was won by Persipura Jayapura, and Persela U-21 won the under-21 competition. The Premier Division champions were Persiba Bantul.

== National teams ==
=== Senior team ===
This section covers Indonesia's senior team matches from October 2010 until the end of the 2014 FIFA World Cup qualification - AFC First round.

==== Friendly matches ====
8 October 2010	Indonesia	1 – 7	Uruguay	Jakarta, Indonesia
20:00 (UTC+7)	Boaz 18'	Report	Cavani 35', 80', 83'; Suárez 43', 54', 69' (pen.); Eguren 58'	Stadium: Gelora Bung Karno Stadium; Attendance: 80,000; Referee: Abas Din Dadur (Singapore)

12 October 2010	Indonesia	3 - 0	Maldives	Bandung, Indonesia
UTC+7	Maniani 30'; Aribowo 74'; Sucipto 90'			Stadium: Siliwangi Stadium; Attendance: 13,000; Referee: (Singapore) Pandian Palaniyandi

21 November 2010	Indonesia	6 – 0	Timor-Leste	Palembang, Indonesia
UTC+7	Ridwan 15'; Maniani 27'; González 39', 48'; Pamungkas 64'; Aribowo 85'	Report		Stadium: Gelora Sriwijaya Stadium

24 November 2010	Indonesia	2 – 0	Chinese Taipei	Palembang, Indonesia
UTC+7	González 10'; Utina 18' (pen.)	Report		Stadium: Gelora Sriwijaya Stadium; Referee: Sukhbir Singh (Singapore)

=== U-17 ===
These results and fixtures included AFC and AFF competition, when AFC U-16 Championship, serves as a qualification tournament for the FIFA U-17 World Cup, and AFF U-16 Youth Championship tournament's eligibility criteria that was played at under-16 level, while FIFA competition, named FIFA U-17 World Cup, founded as the FIFA U-16 World Championship, is the world championship of association football for male players under the age of 17. So, Indonesia U-17 team serves as Indonesia U-16 team on AFC U-16 Championship and AFF U-16 Youth Championship.

==== 2010 AFF U-16 Youth Championship ====
Player may not over the age of 16 years.

20 September 2010 Group stage	Indonesia	1 – 0	Timor-Leste	Manahan Stadium, Solo, Indonesia
18:00 (UTC+7)	Antoni Putro Nugroho 90+1'	Report		Attendance: 10,000

22 September 2010 Group stage	Vietnam	1 – 0	Indonesia	Manahan Stadium, Solo, Indonesia
18:00 (UTC+7)	Nguyen Do 6'	Report

24 September 2010 Group stage	Indonesia	1 – 3	China	Manahan Stadium, Solo, Indonesia
18:00 (UTC+7)	Sun Zhengao 59' (o.g.)	Report	Liang Yu 9'; Chen Shuo 18'; Shen Tianfeng 70'

26 September 2010 Third-place play-off	Timor-Leste	2 – 0	Indonesia	Manahan Stadium, Solo, Indonesia
15:30 (UTC+7)	Fidel Santos 50'; Rogerio Seran 56'	Report

==== 2010 AFC U-16 Championship ====
Player may not over the age of 16 years.

24 October 2010 Group stage	Uzbekistan	3 – 0	Indonesia	Pakhtakor Stadium, Tashkent, Uzbekistan
15:00 (UTC+5)	Khakimov 31', 47'; Sobirkhodjaev 60'	Report		Attendance: 16,500; Referee: (Iran) Alireza Faghani

26 October 2010 Group stage	Indonesia	4 – 1	Tajikistan	Pakhtakor Stadium, Tashkent, Uzbekistan
19:00 (UTC+5)	Rasyid 11'; Antoni 47', 59'; Angga 71'	Report	Saidov 85'	Attendance: 1,300; Referee: (Kuwait) Yousef Al-Marzouq

28 October 2010 Group stage	Jordan	1-0	Indonesia	JAR Stadium, Tashkent, Uzbekistan
13:00 (UTC+5)
