= Edison Ames =

Indonesian footballer

Personal information
- Full name: Edison Ames
- Date of birth: 28 May 1985 (age 41)
- Place of birth: Merauke, Indonesia
- Height: 1.74 m (5 ft 9 in)
- Position: Defender

Senior career*
Years	Team	Apps	(Gls)
2006–2008	PS Yelmasu Putra	10	(0)
2008–2010	Persipura Jayapura	20	(0)
2010–2012	Persidafon Dafonsoro	24	(0)
2013–2014	Persiram Raja Ampat	16	(0)
- * Club domestic league appearances and goals as of 21:30, 27 June 2016 (UTC)

Edison Ames (born 28 May 1985 in Merauke, Papua) is an Indonesian former footballer who plays as a defender.

== Honours ==
=== Club honors ===
Persipura Jayapura

- Indonesia Super League (1): 2008–09
- Indonesian Community Shield (1): 2009
