= Iqbal Samad =

Indonesian footballer

Personal information
- Full name: Iqbal Samad
- Date of birth: 17 June 1983 (age 43)
- Place of birth: Gowa, Indonesia
- Height: 1.70 m (5 ft 7 in)
- Position: Defender

Senior career*
Years	Team	Apps	(Gls)
2006–2008	PSM Makassar		
2009–2010	Bontang	49	(0)
2010–2012	Persiba Balikpapan	25	(0)
2013–2016	PSM Makassar	47	(2)
2016–2017	Persiba Balikpapan	44	(0)
2018–2019	Persis Solo	18	(0)
- * Club domestic league appearances and goals as of 11 July 2012

Iqbal Samad (born June 17, 1983 in Gowa Regency) is an Indonesian former footballer.

== Club statistics ==
Club	Season	Super League		Premier Division		Piala Indonesia		Total	
Club	Season	Apps	Goals	Apps	Goals	Apps	Goals	Apps	Goals
Bontang FC	2009-10	28	0	-		-		28	0
Bontang FC	2010-11	9	0	-		-		9	0
Persiba Balikpapan	2010-11	12	0	-		-		12	0
Persiba Balikpapan	2011-12	13	0	-		-		13	0
Total		62	0	-		-		62	0
