= Victor Igbonefo =

Indonesian footballer

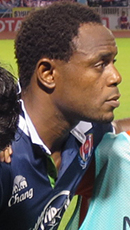
- Igbonefo playing for Navy in 2016

Personal information
- Full name: Victor Chukwuekezie Igbonefo
- Date of birth: 10 October 1985 (age 41)
- Place of birth: Enugu, Nigeria
- Height: 6 ft 0 in (1.83 m)
- Position: Centre-back

Youth career
- Nigerdock Soccer Academy

Senior career*
Years	Team	Apps	(Gls)
2003–2004	First Bank	18	(0)
2005–2011	Persipura Jayapura	162	(8)
2011–2012	Pelita Jaya	31	(5)
2012	→ Chiangrai United (loan)	12	(1)
2013–2016	Arema Cronus	60	(0)
2015	→ Osotspa Samut Prakan (loan)	8	(0)
2016	Navy	29	(2)
2017	Nakhon Ratchasima	33	(2)
2018	Persib Bandung	27	(0)
2019	PTT Rayong	27	(0)
2020–2025	Persib Bandung	60	(0)
Total		467	(18)

International career
2014	Indonesia Asian Games (O.P.)	4	(0)
2013–2021	Indonesia	14	(0)
Medal record
Men's football
Representing Indonesia
AFF Championship
Runner-up	2020 Singapore	Team
- * Club domestic league appearances and goals as of 24 May 2025

Victor Chukwuekezie Igbonefo // (born 10 October 1985) is a retired professional footballer who plays as a centre-back. Born in Nigeria, he played for the Indonesia national team.

== Club career ==
=== Early career ===
Igbonefo started his career by joining Nigerdock Soccer Academy in Nigeria. In 2003, He signed his first professional contract for Lagos based club, First Bank. He made 18 league appearances with the club before leaving in 2004.

=== Persipura Jayapura ===
In 2005, Igbonefo signed for Indonesian league giant, Persipura Jayapura. On his first season with the club, he won the 2005 Indonesian League, after defeating Persija Jakarta 3–2 in the final. Igbonefo became a key player for Persipura in their campaign to win the league in 2008–09 and 2010–11 respectively, he also formed a solid partnership in the heart of defence with Bio Paulin. On 7 October 2009, Igbonefo helped Persipura to win the 2009 Indonesian Community Shield after defeating Sriwijaya 3–1 at Andi Mattalatta Stadium.

=== Pelita Jaya ===
On 12 October 2011, it was announced that Igbonefo has joined Pelita Jaya, two-days after he was naturalized as Indonesian citizen. He only stayed a season, making 31 appearances and scoring 5 goals.

On 6 August 2012, Igbonefo was loaned out to Thai Premier League club Chiangrai United. He was loaned with teammate Greg Nwokolo until October 2012. During his short loan spell, Igbonefo made 12 appearances and scoring a goal.

=== Arema Cronus ===
During the 2013 season, Igbonefo helped Arema Cronus finish as league runners-up. On 25 February 2014, Igbonefo scored his first goal for Arema Cronus, in a 1–1 draw against Selangor in the 2014 AFC Cup group stage match tie.

On 28 July 2015, Igbonefo returned to Thailand, by signing a loan deal for Osotspa Samut Prakan, he was given the number 30 shirt. He was signed by the team, to strengthen them in the second half of the 2015 season.

=== Navy ===
On 2 January 2016, It was announced that Igbonefo has joined Thai League 1 club, Royal Navy. On 20 July 2016, He scored an equaliser in the 90th-minute to help Navy hold BEC Tero Sasana 1–1. In his only season with the club, Igbonefo recorded 29 appearances and scored 2 goals, with his team finishing 14th in the league.

== International career ==
The Football Association of Indonesia (PSSI) announced that Igbonefo has been officially naturalised on 10 October 2011. He made his debut for the Indonesia national football team in the 2015 AFC Asian Cup qualification campaign against Saudi Arabia on 23 March 2013.

== Career statistics ==
=== Club ===
As of match played 24 May 2025

Club	Season	League			Cup (Note: Includes Thai FA Cup)		Continental (Note: Appearances in AFC Cup)		Other		Total	
Club	Season	Division	Apps	Goals	Apps	Goals	Apps	Goals	Apps	Goals	Apps	Goals
Pelita Jaya	2011–12	Indonesia Super League	31	5	0	0	–		0	0	31	5
Chiangrai United (loan)	2012	Thai Premier League	12	1	0	0	–		0	0	12	1
Arema	2013	Indonesia Super League	32	0	0	0	–		0	0	32	0
Arema	2014	Indonesia Super League	26	0	0	0	7	1	0	0	33	1
Arema	2015	Indonesia Super League	2	0	0	0	–		0	0	2	0
Arema	Total		60	0	0	0	7	1	0	0	67	1
Samut Prakan (loan)	2015	Thai Premier League	8	0	0	0	–		0	0	8	0
Navy	2016	Thai League 1	29	2	0	0	–		0	0	29	2
Nakhon Ratchasima	2017	Thai League 1	33	2	2	0	–		0	0	35	2
Persib Bandung	2018	Liga 1	27	0	0	0	–		2 (Note: Appearances in Indonesia President's Cup)	0	29	0
PTT Rayong	2019	Thai League 1	27	0	1	0	–		0	0	28	0
Persib Bandung	2020	Liga 1	3	0	0	0	–		0	0	3	0
Persib Bandung	2021–22	Liga 1	19	0	0	0	–		8 (Note: Appearances in Menpora Cup)	1	27	1
Persib Bandung	2022–23	Liga 1	15	0	0	0	–		2	1	17	1
Persib Bandung	2023–24	Liga 1	14	0	0	0	–		0	0	14	0
Persib Bandung	2024–25	Liga 1	7	0	0	0	1 (Note: Appearances in AFC Champions League Two)	0	0	0	8	0
Persib Bandung	Total		60	0	0	0	1	0	10	2	71	2
Career total			285	10	3	0	8	1	11	2	308	13

=== International ===
As of match played 9 December 2021

Appearances and goals by national team and year
National team	Year	Apps	Goals
Indonesia	2013	6	0
Indonesia	2014	2	0
Indonesia	2015	2	0
Indonesia	2021	4	0
Total		14	0

== Honours ==
Persipura Jayapura

- Indonesia Super League: 2008–09, 2010–11
- Liga Indonesia Premier Division: 2005
- Indonesian Community Shield: 2009
- Copa Indonesia runner-up: 2006, 2007–08, 2008–09

Arema Cronus

- Menpora Cup: 2013
- Inter Island Cup: 2014

Persib Bandung

- Liga 1: 2023–24, 2024–25

Indonesia

- AFF Championship runner-up: 2020

Individual

- Menpora Cup Best XI: 2021

== See also ==
- List of Indonesia international footballers born outside Indonesia
