= David da Rocha =

Brazilian footballer (born 1980)

David Genuino
Personal information
- Full name: David da Rocha Genuino
- Date of birth: 17 November 1980 (age 45)
- Place of birth: Brazil
- Height: 1.78 m (5 ft 10 in)
- Position: Midfielder

Senior career*
Years	Team	Apps	(Gls)
2003–2009	Persipura Jayapura	200	(134)
2010–2011	US Raon-l'Étape	37	(40)
2011	Jakarta FC 1928	29	(7)
2011–2012	PSM Makassar	44	(34)
Total		310	(215)
- * Club domestic league appearances and goals

David da Rocha Genuino (born 17 November 1980) is a Brazilian former footballer who plays as a midfielder.

== Honours ==
Persipura Jayapura

- Liga Indonesia Premier Division: 2005
- Indonesia Super League: 2008–09
- Copa Indonesia runner-up: 2006, 2007–08, 2008–09
