= Yoo Jae-hoon =

South Korean footballer (born 1984)

Personal information
- Date of birth: 7 July 1984 (age 42)
- Place of birth: Ulsan, South Korea
- Height: 1.88 m (6 ft 2 in)
- Position: Goalkeeper

Team information
- Current team: Persija Jakarta (goalkeeper coach)

College career
Years	Team	Apps	(Gls)
- University of Ulsan

Senior career*
Years	Team	Apps	(Gls)
2005–2010	Daejeon Citizen	46	(0)
2010–2014	Persipura Jayapura	110	(0)
2015	Bali United	2	(0)
2016–2018	Persipura Jayapura	54	(0)
2018	Mitra Kukar	18	(0)
2019	Barito Putera	2	(0)
Total		232	(0)

Managerial career
- 2021–2025: Indonesia (goalkeeper coach)
- 2026: Persijap Jepara (goalkeeper coach)
- 2026–: Persija Jakarta (goalkeeper coach)
- * Club domestic league appearances and goals

- Yoo Jae-hoon
- Hangul: 유재훈
- Hanja: 兪在勳
- RR: Yu Jaehun
- MR: Yu Chaehun

Yoo Jae-hoon (Korean: 유재훈; born 7 July 1984) is a Korean professional football coach and former player who is the goalkeeper coach for Super League club Persija Jakarta.

== Career ==
Yoo was the first-choice goalkeeper for Persipura Jayapura from 2010 to 2014, moving to Bali United for a season in 2015 before returning to the club in 2016.

== Honours ==
Persipura Jayapura

- Indonesia Super League: 2010–11, 2013
- Indonesian Inter Island Cup: 2011
- Indonesia Soccer Championship A: 2016

Individual

- Indonesia Super League Best Goalkeeper: 2013
