= Jendri Pitoy =

Indonesian footballer

Personal information
- Full name: Jendri Chriestian Pitoy
- Date of birth: 15 January 1981 (age 45)
- Place of birth: Tomohon, Indonesia
- Height: 1.78 m (5 ft 10 in)
- Position: Goalkeeper

Youth career
- 1997–1999: Persmin Minahasa

Senior career*
Years	Team	Apps	(Gls)
2000–2001	Persma Manado	23	(0)
2001–2004	Persikota Tangerang	88	(0)
2004–2010	Persipura Jayapura	178	(0)
2010–2011	Perseman Manokwari	18	(0)
2011–2012	Persija Jakarta	16	(0)
2012–2013	Persib Bandung	32	(0)
2013–2014	Persiram Raja Ampat	18	(0)
2014–2016	Bhayangkara	19	(0)
2016–2017	Perseka Kaimana	18	(0)
2017–2018	PSBS Biak	10	(0)
Total		386	(0)

International career
2001–2003	Indonesia U23		
2003–2008	Indonesia	18	(0)

Managerial career
- 2018–2020: PSBS Biak (Goalkeeper coach)
- 2020–2021: Sulut United (Goalkeeper coach)
- 2021–2022: Persmin Minahasa (Goalkeeper coach)
- 2022–: Sulut United (Goalkeeper coach)
- * Club domestic league appearances and goals

Jendri Chriestian Pitoy (born 15 January 1981) is an Indonesian former footballer. He was a goalkeeper.

He played for the Indonesia national football team as the first team regular. His international debut as a senior national team player was for a friendly match between Indonesia and Malaysia on 26 September 2003 and the match was ended draw 1–1. In Sea Games 2001 he brought U-23 National Team to 4th place after losing 0–1 from Myanmar (3rd place). In Sea Games 2003 in Hanoi, Vietnam he failed to bring U-23 National Team to Semi Final. The team were not qualified from group qualification at first round. In Asian Cup 2007, he played in two matches in group D qualification in Jakarta. Those two matches are Indonesia against Bahrain (won 2–1) and Indonesia against Saudi Arabia (lost 1–2).

Jendri brought his club Persipura Jayapura to win Liga Indonesia together with teammates in his club. At the end of 2012 he joined Persiram Raja Ampat for one season. And now, he plays for Persebaya Bhayangkara.

== National team career ==
- 2001: SEA Games Kuala Lumpur
- 2003: SEA Games Hanoi
- 2004: Asian Cup, Tiger Cup
- 2006: Brunei Merdeka Games in Malaysia
- 2007: Asian Cup

== Honours ==
Persipura Jayapura

- Liga Indonesia Premier Division: 2005
- Indonesia Super League: 2008–09
- Indonesian Community Shield: 2009
- Copa Indonesia runner-up: 2006, 2007–08, 2008–09

Indonesia

- AFF Championship runner-up: 2002, 2004
