= Steven Hendambo =

Indonesian footballer

Personal information
- Full name: Steven Raynold Hendambo
- Date of birth: 14 June 1986 (age 40)
- Place of birth: Jayapura, Indonesia
- Height: 1.71 m (5 ft 7 1/2 in)
- Position: Defender

Youth career
- 1998–2004: Persidafon Dafonsoro

Senior career*
Years	Team	Apps	(Gls)
2005–2008	Persidafon Dafonsoro		
2008–2009	Persitara Jakarta Utara	2	(0)
2009–2010	Persiba Bantul	5	(0)
2010–2011	Persipura Jayapura	0	(0)
2011–2014	Persiram Raja Ampat	48	(3)
- * Club domestic league appearances and goals

Steven Hendambo (born 14 June 1986) is an Indonesian former footballer who played as a defender.

== Honours ==
=== Club honors ===
Persipura Jayapura

- Indonesia Super League (1): 2010–11
