= David Laly =

Indonesian footballer (born 1992)

Personal information
- Full name: David Laly
- Date of birth: 7 November 1992 (age 34)
- Place of birth: Wamena, Indonesia
- Height: 1.68 m (5 ft 6 in)
- Position: Winger

Team information
- Current team: Persikota Tangerang
- Number: 24

Youth career
- 2008–2009: Persipura Jayapura

Senior career*
Years	Team	Apps	(Gls)
2009–2013	Persipura Jayapura	46	(1)
2013	→ Persidafon Dafonsoro (loan)	17	(4)
2014–2015	Pelita Bandung Raya	29	(3)
2016	Persib Bandung	15	(1)
2017	Barito Putera	21	(1)
2018	Felcra	20	(5)
2019–2022	Madura United	55	(4)
2022–2023	RANS Nusantara	22	(1)
2023–2024	Persiraja Banda Aceh	18	(2)
2024–2026	Persijap Jepara	19	(2)
2026	→ Persiraja Banda Aceh (loan)	6	(0)
2026–	Persikota Tangerang	1	(0)

International career
2011–2013	Indonesia U23	3	(0)
Medal record
Men's football
Representing Indonesia
Islamic Solidarity Games
Silver medal – second place	2013 Palembang	Team
- * Club domestic league appearances and goals as of 13 November 2026

David Laly (born 7 November 1992) is an Indonesian professional footballer who plays as a winger for Liga Nusantara club Persikota Tangerang.

== Club career ==
=== Pelita Bandung Raya ===
He signed a contract with Pelita Bandung Raya on 18 November 2013. Laly made his debut on 1 February 2014 in a match against Persita Tangerang. On 26 May 2014, Laly scored his first goal for Pelita Bandung Raya against Persegres Gresik United in the 16th minute at the Si Jalak Harupat Stadium, Soreang, Bandung.

=== Persib Bandung ===
On 21 January 2016, he signed a one-year contract with Persib Bandung on a free transfer, alongside his club teammates Rachmad Hidayat and Kim Kurniawan.

=== Barito Putera ===
In the 2017 season, he signed a one-year contract with PS Barito Putera. Laly made his debut on 15 April 2014 in a match against Mitra Kukar. On 18 July 2017, Laly scored his first goal for Barito Putera against PSM Makassar in the 73rd minute at the Andi Mattalatta Stadium, Makassar.

=== Felcra FC ===
In January 2018, he signed a one-year contract with Malaysia Premier League club Felcra. He made his first-team debut for Felcra after starting the 2018 Malaysia Premier League match against PDRM F.A. on 2 February 2018, in which Felcra drew 1–1.

=== Madura United ===
He was signed for Madura United to play in Liga 1 in the 2019 season. David Laly made his debut on 17 May 2019 in a match against Persela Lamongan. On 16 August 2018, Laly scored his first goal for Madura United against Persija Jakarta in the 48th minute at the Gelora Madura Stadium, Pamekasan.

=== RANS Nusantara ===
Laly was signed for RANS Nusantara to play in Liga 1 in the 2022–23 season. He made his league debut on 23 July 2022 in a match against PSIS Semarang at the Jatidiri Stadium, Semarang.

== Honours ==
Persipura Jayapura

- Indonesia Super League: 2010–11
- Indonesian Community Shield: 2009
- Indonesian Inter Island Cup: 2011
- SCTV Cup: 2011

Felcra

- Malaysia Premier League runner-up: 2018

Persijap Jepara

- Liga 2 third place (play-offs): 2024–25

Indonesia U-23

- Islamic Solidarity Games silver medal: 2013
