= Yohanes Pahabol =

Indonesian footballer

Personal information
- Full name: Yohanes Ferinando Pahabol
- Date of birth: 16 January 1992 (age 34)
- Place of birth: Yahukimo, Indonesia
- Height: 1.57 m (5 ft 2 in)
- Position: Winger

Team information
- Current team: Persipura Jayapura
- Number: 17

Youth career
- 2007: PS Soison
- 2008–2009: Persiwa Wamena
- 2009: Persipura Jayapura
- 2010–2011: Persiwa Wamena
- 2011–2012: Persidafon Dafonsoro

Senior career*
Years	Team	Apps	(Gls)
2010–2011	Persiwa Wamena	7	(0)
2011–2012	Persidafon Dafonsoro	30	(15)
2012–2017	Persipura Jayapura	111	(23)
2018	Persebaya Surabaya	25	(3)
2019	Kalteng Putra	30	(4)
2020–2022	Persipura Jayapura	34	(10)
2022–2024	Persik Kediri	41	(4)
2024–2025	Persibo Bojonegoro	18	(2)
2025–	Persipura Jayapura	22	(0)

International career
2013–2015	Indonesia U23	10	(1)
Medal record
Men's football
Representing Indonesia
Southeast Asian Games
Silver medal – second place	2013 Naypyidaw	Team
- * Club domestic league appearances and goals as of 26 September 2026

Yohanes Ferinando Pahabol, better known as Feri Pahabol, (born on 16 January 1992) is an Indonesian professional footballer who plays as a winger for Championship club Persipura Jayapura.

== International goals ==
Yohanes Pahabol: International under-23 goals

Goal	Date	Venue	Opponent	Score	Result	Competition
1	24 November 2013	Gelora Bung Karno Stadium, Jakarta, Indonesia	Maldives U-23	1–1	2–1	2013 MNC Cup

== Personal life ==
Pahabol is a Christian who gives credit to Jesus for his success. His younger brother, Joshua, is also a professional player, who played for Persiraja in 2007.

In May 2016, Pahabol, along with teammates Roni Beroperay and Gerard Pangkali graduated from the Cenderawasih University in Jayapura with a Bachelor of Economics

== Honours ==
Persipura Jayapura

- Indonesia Super League: 2013
- Indonesia Soccer Championship A: 2016

Indonesia U-23

- SEA Games silver medal: 2013
