= Rahmat Rivai =

Indonesian footballer

Personal information
- Full name: Rahmat Ma'ruf Rivai
- Date of birth: 1 December 1977 (age 48)
- Place of birth: Ternate, Indonesia
- Height: 1.66 m (5 ft 5 1/2 in)
- Position: Striker

Youth career
- 1989–1995: Persiter Ternate

Senior career*
| Years | Team | Apps | (Gls) |
| 1996–1997 | Persiter Ternate | | |
| 1998–2000 | Persebaya Surabaya | | |
| 2001–2003 | PSPS Pekanbaru | 21 | (11) |
| 2004–2008 | Persiter Ternate | 56 | (23) |
| 2008–2009 | Persitara North Jakarta | 30 | (13) |
| 2009–2010 | Sriwijaya | 28 | (8) |
| 2010–2011 | Persipura Jayapura | 13 | (2) |
| 2011–2012 | Sriwijaya | 9 | (0) |
| 2012 | Gresik United | 15 | (1) |

International career
| 2007 | Indonesia | 1 | (0) |
- * Club domestic league appearances and goals

Rahmat Ma'ruf Rivai (also spelled Rachmat Rifai; born 1 December 1977), nicknamed Si Poci ("teapot"), is a former Indonesian professional footballer who played as a striker.

== Honours ==
Sriwijaya

- Piala Indonesia (1): 2010

Persipura Jayapura

- Indonesia Super League (1): 2010–11
