= Ortizan Solossa =

Indonesian footballer

Personal information
- Full name: Ortizan Bertilone Nusye Solossa
- Date of birth: 28 October 1977 (age 49)
- Place of birth: Sorong, Indonesia
- Height: 1.69 m (5 ft 6 1/2 in)
- Position: Left-back

Youth career
- 1995–1996: Persiss Sorong
- 1996–1997: Diklat PPLP Irian Jaya

Senior career*
Years	Team	Apps	(Gls)
1997–1999	Persipura Jayapura	33	(1)
1999–2004	PSM Makassar	91	(5)
2004–2006	Persija Jakarta	64	(5)
2006–2008	Arema Malang	46	(1)
2008–2013	Persipura Jayapura	127	(5)
2013–2014	Persiram Raja Ampat	19	(0)
Total		380	(17)

International career
2004–2005	Indonesia	14	(1)
- * Club domestic league appearances and goals

Ortizan Solossa (born 28 October 1977 in Sorong, Irian Jaya) is an Indonesian former footballer.

== Club career ==
Leaving Persipura Jayapura and his homeland Papua in 1999, Ortizan played for PSM Makassar, where he scored in the 2004 AFC Champions League, Persija Jakarta, where he met his brother Boaz in the 2005 Liga Indonesia final (Persija lost 3–2 to Boaz's Persipura) and Arema Malang before coming back to Persipura and finally ending his career at Persiram Raja Ampat.

Ortizan obtained a Bachelor of Economics at Cenderawasih University in 2013.

== International career ==
=== International goals ===
No.	Date	Venue	Opponent	Score	Result	Competition
1.	13 December 2004	Mỹ Đình National Stadium, Hanoi, Vietnam	Cambodia	8–0	8–0	2004 Tiger Cup

== Personal life ==
Ortizan was born into a respectable family in Papua. His uncle, Jacobus Perviddya "Jaap" Solossa, was the 12th Governor of Irian Jaya/Papua Province from 2000 until his death in 2005. Aside from his well-known brother Boaz, his other brother Nehemia was also a footballer.

== Honours ==
PSM Makassar

- Liga Indonesia Premier Division: 1999–2000; runner up: 2001

Persija Jakarta

- Liga Indonesia Premier Division runner up: 2005
- Copa Indonesia runner-up: 2005

Persipura Jayapura

- Indonesia Super League: 2008–09, 2010–11
- Indonesian Community Shield: 2009
- Indonesian Inter Island Cup: 2011

Indonesia

- AFF Championship runner-up: 2004
