= Yohanis Tjoe =

Indonesian footballer

Anis Tjoe
Personal information
- Full name: Yohanis Tjoe
- Date of birth: 19 July 1985 (age 41)
- Place of birth: Jayapura, Indonesia
- Height: 1.75 m (5 ft 9 in)
- Position: Defender

Team information
- Current team: Persiker Keerom
- Number: 44

Youth career
- 2005–2007: Yotefa Jayapura

Senior career*
Years	Team	Apps	(Gls)
2008–2009	PSMS Medan	0	(0)
2009–2010	Pro Duta	15	(0)
2010–2019	Persipura Jayapura	146	(4)
2020	Semen Padang	1	(0)
2021	Persewar Waropen	9	(0)
2022	PSBS Biak	3	(0)
2023–2024	Persipura Jayapura	12	(0)
2024–2025	Persewar Waropen	17	(0)
2026–	Persiker Keerom	7	(0)

International career^{‡}
2015	Indonesia	1	(0)
- * Club domestic league appearances and goals as of 7 April 2026 ‡ National team caps and goals as of 25 March 2015

Yohanis Tjoe (born 19 July 1985) is an Indonesian professional footballer who plays as a defender for Liga 4 club Persiker Keerom.

== International career ==
His first cap for Indonesia was in a friendly match against Cameroon on 25 March 2015.

== Honours ==
=== Club honors ===
Persipura Jayapura

- Indonesia Super League: 2010–11, 2013
- Indonesian Inter Island Cup: 2011
- Indonesia Soccer Championship A: 2016
