= Ricardo Salampessy =

Indonesian association football player

Personal information
- Full name: Ricardo Salampessy
- Date of birth: 18 February 1984 (age 42)
- Place of birth: Ambon, Indonesia
- Height: 5 ft 9 in (1.76 m)
- Position: Defender

Youth career
- 1999: Tunas Muda Hamadi
- 2002−2004: PON Papua

Senior career*
Years	Team	Apps	(Gls)
2004−2005	Persiwa Wamena	22	(0)
2005−2013	Persipura Jayapura	123	(6)
2013–2014	Bhayangkara	17	(0)
2015–2023	Persipura Jayapura	125	(4)
Total		287	(10)

International career
2005−2007	Indonesia U23		(1)
2006−2014	Indonesia	25	(1)

Managerial career
- 2023–2025: Persipura Jayapura
- * Club domestic league appearances and goals

Ricardo Salampessy (born 18 February 1984) is an Indonesian former professional footballer who plays as a defender.

== International career ==
Born in Ambon, Maluku, he has played for the Indonesia national football team. His international début in senior national team squad was at the 2006 Merdeka Tournament when Indonesia drew 1–1 with Malaysia on 23 August 2006. In the Asian Cup 2007 he played 3 times from 3 matches when Indonesia won 2–1 against Bahrain, when Indonesia lost 1–2 against Saudi Arabia, and when Indonesia lost 0–1 to South Korea in group D at Jakarta. In 2004, he participated for the Papua football team at PON in South Sumatra. In 2007, he played to represent the Indonesia U-23, in 2007 SEA Games.

== International goals ==
International goals
No.	Date	Venue	Opponent	Score	Result	Competition
1	14 July 2014	Saoud bin Abdulrahman Stadium, Al Wakrah, Qatar	Qatar	1–0	2–2	Friendly

== Managerial statistics ==
As of match played 28 February 2025

Managerial record by team and tenure
Team	Nat	From	To	Record							
Team	Nat	From	To	G	W	D	L	GF	GA	GD	Win %
Persipura Jayapura	(Indonesia)	25 December 2023	Present	29	15	6	8	51	25	+26	51.72
Career Total				29	15	6	8	51	25	+26	51.72

== Honours ==
=== Club ===
Persipura Jayapura

- Indonesia Super League: 2008–09, 2010–11, 2013
- Indonesian Community Shield: 2009
- Indonesian Inter Island Cup: 2011
- Indonesia Soccer Championship A: 2016
- Copa Indonesia runner-up: 2006, 2007–08, 2008–09

=== Individual ===
- Liga Indonesia First Division Best Player: 2005
- Liga 1 Team of the Season: 2019
