= Ferdiansyah (footballer, born 1983) =

Indonesian football goalkeeper

Personal information
- Full name: Ferdiansyah
- Date of birth: 13 February 1983 (age 43)
- Place of birth: Malang, Indonesia
- Height: 1.75 m (5 ft 9 in)
- Position: Goalkeeper

Senior career*
Years	Team	Apps	(Gls)
2005	Persiter Ternate	0	(0)
2006	Persma Manado	0	(0)
2007–2016	Persipura Jayapura	19	(0)
2017	Persela Lamongan	10	(0)
2018	PSIS Semarang	0	(0)
2019	Persiba Balikpapan	5	(0)
2020–2021	Hizbul Wathan	10	(0)
Total		44	(0)

Managerial career
- 2021–: PS Hizbul Wathan Sidoarjo (Goalkeeper Coach)
- * Club domestic league appearances and goals

Ferdiansyah (born 13 February 1983) is an Indonesian professional footballer who plays as a goalkeeper.

== Honours ==
Persipura Jayapura

- Indonesia Super League: 2008–09, 2010–11
- Indonesian Community Shield: 2009
- Indonesian Inter Island Cup: 2011
- Indonesia Soccer Championship A: 2016
- Copa Indonesia runner-up: 2007–08, 2008–09
