= Stevie Bonsapia =

Indonesian footballer

Personal information
- Full name: Stevie Glory Melianus Bonsapia
- Date of birth: 10 May 1988 (age 38)
- Place of birth: Jayapura, Indonesia
- Height: 1.68 m (5 ft 6 in)
- Positions: Right winger; right back

Youth career
- PPLP Papua

Senior career*
Years	Team	Apps	(Gls)
2006–2013	Persipura Jayapura	65	(4)
2013–2014	Persiram Raja Ampat	22	(2)
2014–2015	Perseru Serui	24	(1)
2015–2016	Semen Padang	22	(0)
2016–2017	Persiba Bantul	25	(1)
Total		158	(8)

International career
2005	Indonesia U-19		
2009–2011	Indonesia U-23	4	(2)
2013	Indonesia	1	(0)
Medal record
Indonesia U-23
Southeast Asian Games
Silver medal – second place	2011 SEA Games	2011
- * Club domestic league appearances and goals

Stevie Bonsapia (born 10 May 1988) is an Indonesian former footballer.

== Career ==
In October 2013, he signed for newly promoted Perseru Serui.

== International goals ==
Stevie Bonsapia: International under-23 goals

Goal	Date	Venue	Opponent	Score	Result	Competition
1	5 December 2009	New Laos National Stadium, Vientiane, Laos	Singapore U-23	2–1	2–2	2009 Southeast Asian Games
2	10 December 2009	New Laos National Stadium, Vientiane, Laos	Myanmar U-23	2–1	3–1	2009 Southeast Asian Games

== Honours ==
Persipura Jayapura

- Indonesia Super League: 2008–09, 2010–11
- Copa Indonesia runner-up: 2007–08, 2008–09

Indonesia U-23

- SEA Games silver medal: 2011
