= Tony Sucipto =

Indonesian footballer (born 1986)

Personal information
- Full name: Tony Sucipto
- Date of birth: 12 February 1986 (age 40)
- Place of birth: Surabaya, Indonesia
- Height: 1.68 m (5 ft 6 in)
- Positions: Defender; defensive midfielder

Team information
- Current team: Sumsel United (Assistant coach)

Senior career*
Years	Team	Apps	(Gls)
2004–2005	Persijatim	23	(0)
2005−2010	Sriwijaya	112	(8)
2010−2011	Persija Jakarta	24	(2)
2011−2018	Persib Bandung	173	(3)
2019−2024	Persija Jakarta	84	(0)
2024–2025	Persela Lamongan	12	(0)
2025–2026	RANS Nusantara	9	(0)

International career
2002−2003	Indonesia U17		
2004–2006	Indonesia U19		
2006−2009	Indonesia U23	13	(2)
2010−2015	Indonesia	17	(1)

Managerial career
- 2026–: Sumsel United (Assistant coach)
Medal record
Men's football
Representing Indonesia
AFF Championship
Runner-up	2010 Indonesia & Vietnam	Team
- * Club domestic league appearances and goals as of 8 February 2026

Tony Sucipto (born 12 February 1986 in Surabaya, East Java), nicknamed Toncip, is an Indonesian former footballer who plays as a defensive midfielder. he can also play as a left-back or a central defender.

== Personal life ==
Tony is married with children. He is a Muslim who observes the Islamic month of Ramadan.

== Club career ==
=== Persib Bandung ===
After a year at Persija Jakarta, in 2011, Tony signed for Persib Bandung. He scored his first two goals for Persib in a 5-1 win against Persita Tangerang in an Indonesia Super League match on 15 April 2013. In seven years, he made 173 league appearances and scored three goals.

=== Persija Jakarta ===
In 2019, Tony returned to Persija and made his league debut on 20 May 2019 against Barito Putera at the 17th May Stadium, Banjarmasin.

== International goals ==
International under-23 goals

Goal	Date	Venue	Opponent	Score	Result	Competition
1	24 November 2006	Al-Wakrah Stadium, Al Wakrah, Qatar	Singapore U-23	1–0	1–1	2006 Asian Games
2	18 April 2007	Beirut Municipal Stadium, Beirut, Lebanon	Lebanon U-23	2–1	2–1	2008 AFC Men's Pre-Olympic Tournament

International goal

Goal	Date	Venue	Opponent	Score	Result	Competition
1	12 October 2010	Siliwangi Stadium, Bandung, Indonesia	Maldives	3–0	3–0	Friendly

== Honours ==
=== Club ===
Sriwijaya

- Liga Indonesia Premier Division: 2007–08
- Copa Indonesia/Piala Indonesia: 2007–08, 2008–09, 2010

Persib Bandung

- Indonesia Super League: 2014
- Indonesia President's Cup: 2015

Persija Jakarta

- Menpora Cup: 2021
- Piala Indonesia runner-up: 2018–19

RANS Nusantara

- Liga Nusantara: 2025–26

=== International ===
Indonesia

- AFF Championship runner-up: 2010

=== Individual ===
- Indonesia Soccer Championship A Best XI: 2016
