= Imanuel Wanggai =

Indonesian footballer

Personal information
- Full name: Imanuel Wanggai
- Date of birth: 23 February 1988 (age 38)
- Place of birth: Jayapura, Indonesia
- Height: 1.73 m (5 ft 8 in)
- Position: Central midfielder

Team information
- Current team: Persipura Jayapura (assistant coach)

Youth career
- 2000–2005: Persipura Jayapura

Senior career*
Years	Team	Apps	(Gls)
2005–2019	Persipura Jayapura	193	(10)
2016	→ Carsae (loan)	5	(0)
2020–2021	Borneo	2	(0)
2020	→ PSMS Medan (loan)	0	(0)
Total		200	(10)

International career
2005	Indonesia U20		
2008	Indonesia U21	4	(0)
2007–2009	Indonesia U23		(1)
2007–2014	Indonesia	8	(0)

Managerial career
- 2023–2024: Persiker Keerom (assistant)
- 2024–: Persipura Jayapura (assistant)
- * Club domestic league appearances and goals

Imanuel Wanggai, also known as Manu, (born 23 February 1988) is a retired Indonesian footballer who plays as a central midfielder. His cousins, Patrich Wanggai and Izaac Wanggai (now retired and a coach), were also football players. After retiring as a player he took a football coaching course and started his career as an assistant coach for Persiker Keerom.

== Career statistics ==
=== International ===
Appearances and goals by national team and year
National team	Year	Apps	Goals
Indonesia	2007	1	0
Indonesia	2008	0	0
Indonesia	2009	0	0
Indonesia	2010	0	0
Indonesia	2011	0	0
Indonesia	2012	0	0
Indonesia	2013	3	0
Indonesia	2014	4	0
Total		8	0

== Honours ==
Persipura Jayapura

- Liga Indonesia Premier Division: 2005
- Indonesia Super League: 2008–09, 2010–11, 2013
- Indonesian Inter Island Cup: 2011
- Indonesia Soccer Championship A: 2016
- Copa Indonesia runner-up: 2006, 2007–08, 2008–09
