= Jimmy Napitupulu =

Indonesian football referee (born 1966)

- Full name: Jimmy Napitupulu
- Born: October 13, 1966 (age 60); Pekanbaru, Indonesia

International
| Years | League | Role |
| 2002–2011 | FIFA listed | Referee |

Jimmy Napitupulu (born 13 October 1966) is an Indonesian former football referee. He has refereed internationally in the ASEAN Football Championship, and the 2006 FIFA World Cup qualifiers. He is also a referee at the Indonesia Super League.
