= Ian Kabes =

Indonesian footballer

Personal information
- Full name: Ian Louis Kabes
- Date of birth: 14 May 1986 (age 40)
- Place of birth: Jayapura, Indonesia
- Height: 1.75 m (5 ft 9 in)
- Position: Midfielder

Team information
- Current team: Persipura Jayapura
- Number: 13

Youth career
- 2002: PON Papua

Senior career*
Years	Team	Apps	(Gls)
2003–2004	Persijap Jepara	34	(10)
2005–	Persipura Jayapura	374	(44)

International career
2005–2009	Indonesia U23		
2007–2015	Indonesia	5	(0)
- * Club domestic league appearances and goals as of 17 February 2025

Ian Louis Kabes (born 14 May 1986 in Jayapura) is an Indonesian professional footballer who plays as a midfielder for and captains Liga 2 club Persipura Jayapura.

== International careers ==
In 2007, he played to represent the Indonesia U-23, in 2007 SEA Games. His international debut for Indonesia national team on 9 November 2007 against Syria in 1–4 losses. On 23 March 2013, after five years absence he performed again for the Indonesia national team against Saudi Arabia in the 2015 AFC Asian Cup qualification match.

== Career statistics ==
=== International ===
As of match played 25 March 2015

Appearances and goals by national team and year
National team	Year	Apps	Goals
Indonesia	2008	1	0
Indonesia	2013	2	0
Indonesia	2015	2	0
Total		5	0

== Honours ==
Persipura Jayapura

- Liga Indonesia Premier Division: 2005
- Indonesia Super League: 2008–09, 2010–11
- Indonesian Community Shield: 2009
- Indonesian Inter Island Cup: 2011
- Indonesia Soccer Championship A: 2016
- Copa Indonesia runner-up: 2007–08, 2008–09
