= Gerald Pangkali =

Indonesian footballer

Personal information
- Full name: Gerald Rudolf Pangkali
- Date of birth: 20 October 1982 (age 44)
- Place of birth: Jayapura, Indonesia
- Height: 1.70 m (5 ft 7 in)
- Positions: Defensive midfielder; wing-back

Youth career
- 2002−2004: PON Papua

Senior career*
| Years | Team | Apps | (Gls) |
| 2001−2003 | Persiss Sorong | 47 | (12) |
| 2004–2006 | PSPS Pekanbaru | 24 | (5) |
| 2006–2007 | Pelita Jaya | 28 | (4) |
| 2007−2008 | Persija Jakarta | 26 | (0) |
| 2008−2015 | Persipura Jayapura | 154 | (4) |
| 2016–2017 | Borneo | 22 | (1) |
| 2017–2018 | 757 Kepri Jaya FC | 8 | (1) |
| Total | | 308 | (27) |

International career
| 2014 | Indonesia | 0 | (0) |
- * Club domestic league appearances and goals

Gerald Rudolf Pangkali (born 20 October 1982) is an Indonesian former professional footballer. He played a match for Indonesia against Nepal, which was not included as a FIFA "A" match.

== Personal life ==
Pangkali like many of his Papuan teammates is Christian, after scoring a goal in the 2015 AFC Cup he took off his shirt to reveal the phrase "I Love Jesus".

In May 2016, Beroperay, along with teammates Yohanes Pahabol and Roni Beroperay graduated from the Cenderawasih University in Jayapura with a Bachelor of Laws.

== Honours ==
Persipura Jayapura

- Indonesia Super League: 2008–09, 2010–11
- Indonesian Community Shield: 2009
- Indonesian Inter Island Cup: 2011
- Copa Indonesia runner-up: 2007–08, 2008–09
