= Yustinus Pae =

Indonesian footballer (born 1983)

Tinus Pae
Personal information
- Full name: Yustinus Pae
- Date of birth: 19 June 1983 (age 43)
- Place of birth: Jayapura, Indonesia
- Height: 1.72 m (5 ft 8 in)
- Positions: Right back; winger

Team information
- Current team: Persipura Jayapura
- Number: 21

Youth career
- 1995–2002: Persipura Jayapura

Senior career*
Years	Team	Apps	(Gls)
2007–2021	Persipura Jayapura	293	(17)
2021	Dewa United	9	(0)
2022–	Persipura Jayapura	52	(0)

International career
2013–2019	Indonesia	6	(0)
- * Club domestic league appearances and goals as of 8 May 2026

Yustinus Pae or Tinus Pae (born 19 June 1983) is an Indonesian professional footballer for Liga 2 club Persipura Jayapura. Mainly as a right back but also as a right winger. His younger brother Fiktor Pae is also a professional footballer who plays for Persipal Palu (2022).

== Career statistics ==
=== International ===
As of match played 10 September 2019

Appearances and goals by national team and year
National team	Year	Apps	Goals
Indonesia	2013	1	0
Indonesia	2015	1	0
Indonesia	2019	4	0
Total		6	0

== Honours ==
=== Club honors ===
Persipura Jayapura

- Indonesia Super League: 2008–09, 2010–11
- Indonesian Community Shield: 2009
- Indonesian Inter Island Cup: 2011
- Indonesia Soccer Championship A: 2016
- Copa Indonesia runner-up: 2007–08, 2008–09

Dewa United

- Liga 2 third place (play-offs): 2021

=== Individual ===
- Indonesia Soccer Championship A Best XI: 2016
