= Zah Rahan Krangar =

Liberian footballer

Personal information
- Full name: Zah Rahan Krangar
- Date of birth: 7 March 1985 (age 41)
- Place of birth: Monrovia, Liberia
- Height: 1.65 m (5 ft 5 in)
- Position: Midfielder

Youth career
- 2002: None Team

Senior career*
Years	Team	Apps	(Gls)
2002–2003	Young Fellows Juventus	4	(0)
2003–2004	Racing Bafoussam	11	(0)
2004–2005	Persekaba Badung	24	(4)
2005–2006	Persekabpas Pasuruan	24	(11)
2007–2010	Sriwijaya	99	(27)
2010–2014	Persipura Jayapura	80	(22)
2014–2017	Felda United	85	(25)
2018–2019	Madura United	31	(6)
2020–2021	PSS Sleman	2	(0)
2021	Persela Lamongan	0	(0)
2024–	FC Fassell	0	(0)
Total		360	(95)

International career
2006–2017	Liberia	32	(5)
- * Club domestic league appearances and goals

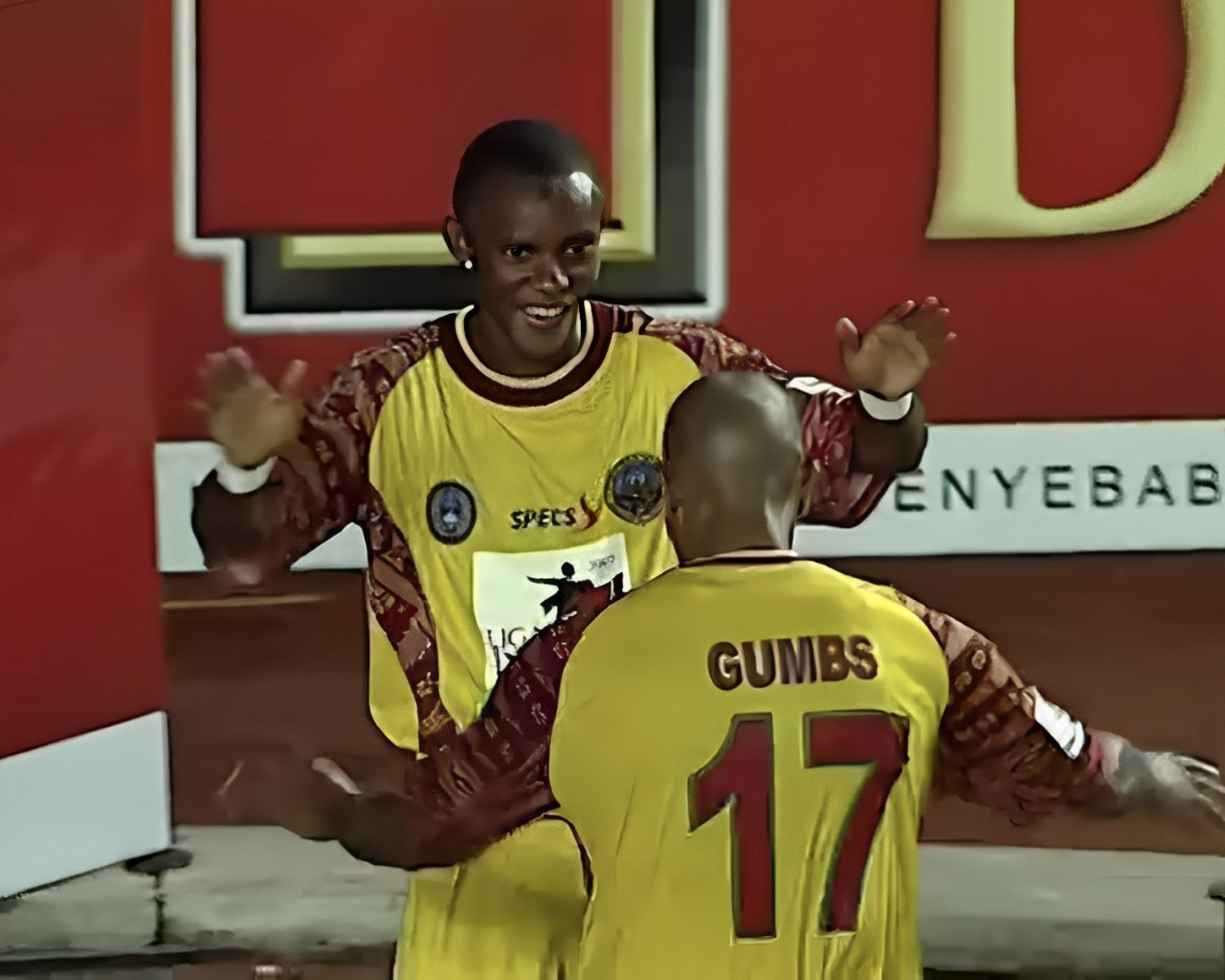
Zah Rahan and Keith "Kayamba" Gumbs with Sriwijaya FC.

Zah Rahan Krangar (born on 7 March 1985) is a Liberian former professional footballer who plays as a midfielder. He has also played for the Liberia national team.

== Club career ==
=== Early career ===
Zah began his career at local club Ducor Defenders in Monrovia, Liberia. Ducor Defenders, he developed into one of the country's best players in his position and was subsequently referred to as "Midfield Zah".

=== Racing Bafoussam Transfer ===
Zah first Asian experience started in 2005 after excellent performances for Cameroonian club Racing Bafoussam. Persekabpas Pasuruan quickly put in a transfer request for the versatile midfielder and he officially signed with the Indonesian club on January 1, 2005.

=== Felda United ===
On 1 January 2014, he signed for Felda United in Malaysia after impressive seasons at Indonesian club Persipura Jayapura. He moved to Felda United which was owned by Federal Land Development Authority of Malaysia (FELDA). Zah made his official debut for Felda United on 9 December 2013 during their pre-season match in Australia ahead of the official start of the league on 12 December 2013.

== International career ==
Zah made his international debut for the Liberia national team on 3 September 2006 playing against Equatorial Guinea where he scored his debut goal in Liberia 2–1 away lost.

=== Presidential Cup friendly ===
Zah scored two goals to helped Liberia clinch a 2−0 win over Ghana in an international friendly or 2nd annual President's Cup in Monrovia in September 2012.

=== Malaysia All Stars XI ===
On 24 July 2015, Zah was listed among five foreign players from the Malaysian League in the Malaysian All Stars XI squad that played against English Premier League club, Liverpool in a Pre-season and the club Asian Tour at the Bukit Jalil National Stadium in Malaysia. The game ended 1−1.

== Style of play ==
Zah is known for his energy in the midfield and has been compared with ex-Arsenal player Alex Song and various other African midfielders who have much pace and stamina. He has also been called a younger version of Michael Essien because of his hard work in the defensive midfielder role.

== International goals ==
No.	Date	Venue	Opponent	Score	Result	Competition
1	3 September 2006	Estadio Internacional, Malabo, Equatorial Guinea	Equatorial Guinea	1–1	2–1	2008 Africa Cup of Nations qualification
2	4 September 2012	Samuel Kanyon Doe Sports Complex, Monrovia, Liberia	Malawi	1–0	1–0	Friendly
3	11 September 2012	Antoine Tubman Stadium, Monrovia, Liberia	Ghana	2–0	2–0	2012 President Cup
5	9 October 2012	Stade Général Seyni Kountché, Niamey, Niger	Niger	2–3	4–3	Friendly

== Honours ==
Sriwijaya

- Liga Indonesia Premier Division: 2007–08
- Copa Indonesia/Piala Indonesia: 2007–08, 2008–09, 2010

Persipura Jayapura

- Indonesia Super League: 2010–11, 2013
- Indonesian Inter Island Cup: 2011

Felda United

- Malaysian Premier League runner-up: 2014
- FA Cup runner-up: 2014
- Malaysian Super League runner-up: 2016
- Malaysian Super League third place: 2017

Individual

- Liga Indonesia Premier Division Best Player: 2007–08
