= Mandala Stadium =

Stadium in Papua, Indonesia

- Dock V Field
- Interactive map of Mandala Stadium
- Former names: Dock V Field
- Location: Jayapura, Papua, Indonesia
- Coordinates: 2°31′50″S 140°43′25″E
- Owner: Government of Jayapura City
- Operator: Government of Jayapura City
- Capacity: 30,000
- Surface: Zoysia Matrella

Construction
- Built: 1950; 76 years ago
- Renovated: 1972–1973; 2008–2009; 2019–2020

Tenant
- Persipura Jayapura

Mandala Stadium is a multi-purpose stadium in Jayapura, Papua, Indonesia. Founded in 1950 as Dock V Field, It is currently used mostly for football matches. It is the home stadium of one of the biggest and successful Liga 1 Indonesia team, Persipura Jayapura. This stadium is often used in international match competitions, especially in the AFC Cup tournament in 2011, 2014, and 2015. The stadium holds 30,000 people and is the largest stadium in eastern Indonesia until Lukas Enembe Stadium was opened in 2019. This stadium is located in the Dock V area, near the centre of Jayapura as well as the Humboldt Bay.

== See also ==
- Persipura Jayapura
- List of stadiums in Indonesia
- Jayapura
