= Bio Paulin =

Indonesian footballer (born 1984)

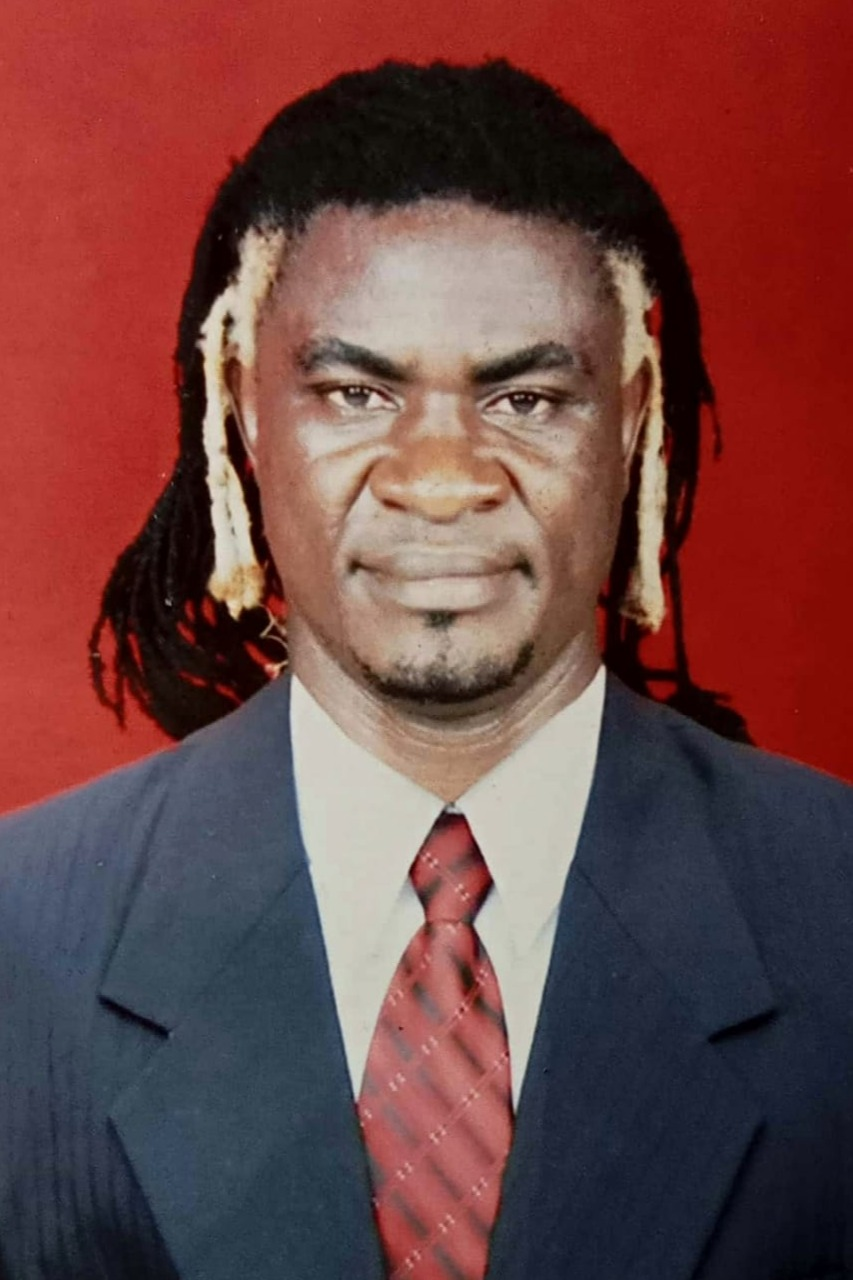
- Bio Paulin in 2023

Personal information
- Full name: Bio Paulin Pierre
- Date of birth: 15 April 1984 (age 42)
- Place of birth: Nanga Eboko, Cameroon
- Height: 1.87 m (6 ft 2 in)
- Position: Centre-back

Team information
- Current team: Persekabpas Pasuruan (head coach)

Youth career
- 1996–2001: Achille Sa'a

Senior career*
Years	Team	Apps	(Gls)
2001–2002	Achille Sa'a	12	(0)
2002−2004	Lens B	50	(8)
2004−2005	Union Douala	18	(0)
2005−2006	Achille Sa'a	24	(0)
2006−2007	Mitra Kukar	32	(1)
2007−2017	Persipura Jayapura	227	(21)
2017–2018	Sriwijaya	11	(0)
2019	PSGC Ciamis	4	(0)
Total		398	(30)

International career
2015	Indonesia	1	(0)

Managerial career
- 2021–2022: Toli
- 2022–2023: Persipura Jayapura (assistant)
- 2024–2025: PSBS Biak (assistant)
- 2025–2026: Pasuruan United
- 2026–: Persekabpas Pasuruan
Medal record
Persipura Jayapura
Winner	Indonesia Super League	2009
Runner-up	Indonesia Super League	2010
Winner	Indonesia Super League	2011
Runner-up	Indonesia Super League	2012
Winner	Indonesia Super League	2013
Runner-up	Indonesia Super League	2014
Winner	Indonesia Soccer Championship A	2016
- * Club domestic league appearances and goals

Bio Paulin Pierre (born 15 April 1984) is a professional football coach and former player who is head coach of Liga Nusantara club Persekabpas Pasuruan. Born in Cameroon, he represented the Indonesia national team.

== International career ==
Bio was naturalised officially on 23 March 2015 as he lived and played in Indonesia for more than nine years. He was called up for the first time to the Indonesia national team by interim head coach Benny Dollo for a friendly match against Myanmar on 30 March 2015.

== Honours ==
=== Club ===
Persipura Jayapura

- Indonesia Super League: 2008–09, 2010–11, 2013
- Indonesian Community Shield: 2009
- Indonesian Inter Island Cup: 2011
- Indonesia Soccer Championship A: 2016

Sriwijaya

- East Kalimantan Governor Cup: 2018

== See also ==
- List of Indonesia international footballers born outside Indonesia
