= Inter Island Cup =

Indonesian Inter Island Cup (IIC)
- Organiser(s): PSSI
- Founded: 2009
- Abolished: 2015
- Teams: 6 (2010); 12 (2011); 16 (2012); 22 (2014–15)
- Last champions: Arema Cronus
- Most championships: Sriwijaya FC (2 titles)

The Indonesian Inter Island Cup (IIC; Indonesian: Piala Antar Pulau) was a national level football tournament held in Indonesia and organized by PSSI as a pre-season tournament during the Indonesia Super League season break. The tournament involved best clubs representing 5 large islands in Indonesia: Sumatra, Java, Kalimantan, Sulawesi and Papua.

The first edition was originally scheduled in 2009 but was cancelled.

The second edition of the tournament was held in August - September 2010. Malang, the home city of Arema Malang (2009–10 ISL champion) and Palembang, the home base of Sriwijaya FC (2010 Piala Indonesia champion) hosted the event.

== Format ==
The 2010 Inter Island Cup was held with a half-competition system, where the 6 participating teams were divided into 2 groups. In 2011, the group stage featured 4 groups of 3 clubs each, and each game was played for 3 x 45 minutes and had to produce a winner (no draw).

== Result ==
=== Finals ===
Season	Champions	Score	Runners-up	Venue
2010	Sriwijaya	2–0	Persiwa	Gelora Sriwijaya, Palembang
2011	Persipura	2–0	Persisam	Mandala, Jayapura
2012	Sriwijaya	2–2 aet (7–6) pen	Persisam	Manahan, Solo
2014	Arema	2–1 aet	Persib	Gelora Sriwijaya, Palembang

=== Third place match ===
Season	Third place	Score	Fourth place	Venue
2011	Pelita Jaya	4–2	Persela Lamongan	Mandala, Jayapura

== Records ==
=== By club ===
The following table lists clubs by number of winners and runners-up in Indonesian Inter Island Cup.

Team	Winners	Runners-up	Years won	Years runners-up
Sriwijaya	2	0	2010, 2012	
Persipura Jayapura	1	0	2011	
Arema Cronus	1	0	2014–15	
Persisam Putra Samarinda	0	2		2011, 2012
Persiwa Wamena	0	1		2010
Persib Bandung	0	1		2014–15

=== By region ===
The following table lists regions by number of winners and runners-up in Indonesian Inter Island Cup.

#	Island	Winners	Runners-up
1	Sumatera	2	0
2	Papua	1	1
3	Java	1	1
4	Kalimantan	0	2

== Broadcasters ==
Year	Broadcaster
2010	RCTI
2011	ANTV
2012	ANTV and tvOne
2014	Indosiar
