= 2008–09 Copa Indonesia =

Tournament details
- Country: Indonesia

Final positions
- Champions: Sriwijaya (2nd title)
- Runners-up: Persipura Jayapura

Tournament statistics
- Top goal scorer(s): Samsul Arif; Pablo Frances (8 goals each)

The 2008–09 Copa Indonesia was the fourth edition of Piala Indonesia, the nationwide football cup tournament in Indonesia, involving clubs from Indonesia Super League, Premier Division and First Division. Sriwijaya was the tournament's defending champions. The winner of the tournament qualified to play for 2010 AFC Champions League qualification.

Sriwijaya became champions for the second year in a row after a 4–0 victory over Persipura Jayapura in the final match at Jakabaring Stadium, Palembang.

== First round ==
Sriwijaya, Persipura Jayapura, Persija Jakarta and Pelita Jaya received byes to third round.

Team 1	Agg.	Team 2	1st leg	2nd leg
PSIR Rembang	4 – 7	Persikab Bandung	2 – 1	2 – 6
PPSM Magelang	(p) 0 – 0	Persis Solo	0 – 0	0 – 0
Semen Padang	1 – 2	PSPS Pekanbaru	1 – 0	0 – 2
PSAP Sigli	2 – 3	PSP Padang	2 – 1	0 – 2
Persikad Depok	3 – 2	Persibat Batang	2 – 1	1 – 1
Persiba Bantul	4 – 1	PSIM Yogyakarta	4 – 1	0 – 0
PS Banyuasin	2 – 3	Persires Rengat	1 – 0	1 – 3
PSIS Semarang	6 – 2	Pro Duta	3 – 0	3 – 2
Persik Kediri	2 – 1	Persekabpas Pasuruan	1 – 1	1 – 0
PKT Bontang	2 – 5	Persiwa Wamena	1 – 1	1 – 4
Persela Lamongan	11 – 1	PS Mojokerto Putra	6 – 0	5 – 1
Deltras Sidoarjo	(p) 0 – 0	Persiram Raja Ampat	0 – 0	0 – 0
Persita Tangerang	2 – 3	Persikabo Bogor	1 – 0	1 – 3
Persigo Gorontalo	4 – 4 (a)	Persidafon Dafonsoro	4 – 1	0 – 3
Persibom Bolaang Mongondow	0 – 0 (p)	Persiba Balikpapan	0 – 0	0 – 0
Arema Malang	3 – 4	Persibo Bojonegoro	2 – 1	1 – 3
Persebaya Surabaya	3 – 1	Gresik United	2 – 1	1 – 0
PSMS Medan	3 – 1	Persiraja Banda Aceh	1 – 0	2 – 1
PSM Makassar	2 – 7	Mitra Kukar	0 – 2	2 – 5
Persikota Tangerang	2 – 4	Persitara North Jakarta	1 – 2	1 – 2
PSS Sleman	0 – 3	Persema Malang	0 – 1	0 – 2
Persijap Jepara	6 – 3	Persiku Kudus	4 – 1	2 – 2
Persib Bandung	4 – 2	PSDS Deli Serdang	2 – 1	2 – 1
Persih Tembilahan	1 – 0	PSSB Bireuen	1 – 0	0 – 0

== Second round ==
Team 1	Agg.	Team 2	1st leg	2nd leg
Deltras Sidoarjo	6 – 0	Persidafon Dafonsoro	3 – 0	3 – 0
PSP Padang	1 – 2	Persih Tembilahan	1 – 0	0 – 2
Persik Kediri	1 – 3	Persiba Bantul	1 – 0	0 – 3
Persibo Bojonegoro	9 – 0	PPSM Magelang	6 – 0	3 – 0
Persiwa Wamena	2 – 3	Persebaya Surabaya	2 – 0	0 – 3
Persib Bandung	3 – 0	Persires Rengat	2 – 0	1 – 0
PSIS Semarang	2 – 4	Persitara North Jakarta	1 – 0	1 – 4
Persijap Jepara	2 – 1	Persikab Bandung	2 – 1	–
PSMS Medan	4 – 2	PSPS Pekanbaru	4 – 2	0 – 0
Persikabo Bogor	4 – 3	Persikad Depok	4 – 2	0 – 1
Persela Lamongan	1 – 2	Persema Malang	1 – 0	0 – 2
Mitra Kukar	0 – 3	Persiba Balikpapan	0 – 2	0 – 1

== Third round ==
Team 1	Agg.	Team 2	1st leg	2nd leg
Persipura Jayapura	5 – 1	Persema Malang	3 – 0	2 – 1
PSMS Medan	5 – 3	Persiba Bantul	5 – 1	0 – 2
Persih Tembilahan	2 – 3	Deltras Sidoarjo	1 – 2	1 – 1
Pelita Jaya	3 – 5	Persibo Bojonegoro	0 – 1	3 – 4
Persijap Jepara	4 – 1	Persikabo Bogor	4 – 0	0 – 1
Persija Jakarta	5 – 2	Persiba Balikpapan	3 – 0	2 – 2
Sriwijaya	4 – 2	Persib Bandung	3 – 1	1 – 1
Persebaya Surabaya	3 – 4	Persitara North Jakarta	2 – 0	1 – 4

== Quarter-finals ==
Team 1	Agg.	Team 2	1st leg	2nd leg
PSMS Medan	1 – 6	Persipura Jayapura	0 – 2	1 – 4
Sriwijaya	7 – 2	Persibo Bojonegoro	5 – 0	2 – 2
Persitara North Jakarta	2 – 3	Persijap Jepara	1 – 0	1 – 3
Persija Jakarta	3 – 4	Deltras Sidoarjo	0 – 1	3 – 3

== Semi-finals ==
Team 1	Agg.	Team 2	1st leg	2nd leg
Persipura Jayapura	6 – 4	Deltras Sidoarjo	3 – 1	3 – 3
Persijap Jepara	1 – 5	Sriwijaya	0 – 2	1 – 3

== Third-place ==
28 June 2009
15.30 WIB

Deltras Sidoarjo	3 – 1	Persijap
Purwaka Yudhi 13'; Junior 27' Hermawan 89'		21' Pablo Frances

Jakabaring Stadium, Palembang
Attendance: 3,000

== Final ==
28 June 2009
19.30 WIB

Persipura Jayapura	0 – 1 (awarded 0–4)	Sriwijaya
	Report	51' Anoure Obiora

Jakabaring Stadium, Palembang
Attendance: 40,000
Referee: Purwanto (Kediri)
