= 2005 Copa Indonesia final =

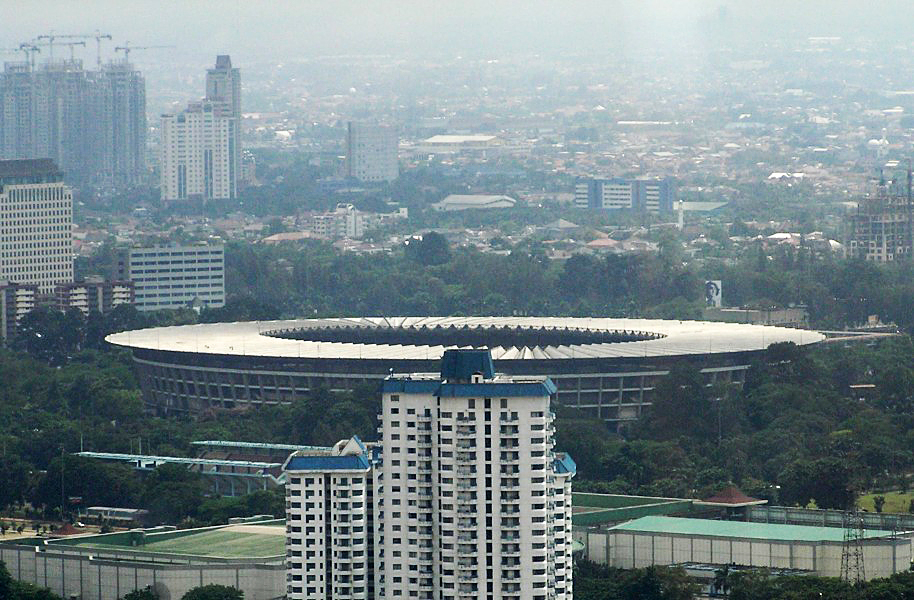
- The final was played at Gelora Bung Karno Stadium.
- Event: 2005 Copa Indonesia
Persija Jakarta	Arema Malang
3	4
- After extra time
- Date: 19 November 2005
- Venue: Gelora Bung Karno Stadium, Jakarta
- Man of the Match: Firman Utina (Arema Malang)
- Referee: Jajat Sudrajat
- Attendance: 55,000
- Weather: Fine

The 2005 Copa Indonesia final was a football match that took place on 19 November 2005 at Gelora Bung Karno Stadium in Jakarta. It was the inaugural final of Piala Indonesia, Indonesia's premier football cup competition. The match was contested by Persija Jakarta and Arema Malang. Arema won the match 4–3 after extra time and entered the group stage of the 2006 AFC Champions League.

== Road to the final ==
Note: In all results below, the score of the finalist is given first (H: home; A: away).

Persija Jakarta				Round	Arema Malang			
Opponent	Agg.	1st leg	2nd leg	Round	Opponent	Agg.	1st leg	2nd leg
Persikad Depok	7–2	5–1 (H)	2–1 (A)	First round	Persela Lamongan	4–2	4–2 (H)	0–0 (A)
Persikota Tangerang	4–3	2–3 (H)	2–0 (A)	Second round	Deltras Sidoarjo	7–0	4–0 (H)	3–0 (w/o) (A)
Persmin Minahasa	2–1	2–0 (H)	0–1 (A)	Third round	PSDS Deli Serdang	6–2	4–1 (A)	2–1 (H)
Persekaba Badung	2–1	1–1 (A)	1–0 (H)	Quarter-finals	Persegi Gianyar	w/o		
PSMS Medan	4–3	1–2 (A)	3–1 (H)	Semi-finals	PSS Sleman	5–0	2–0 (A)	3–0 (H)

== Match details ==
19 November 2005
19:00 WIB

Persija Jakarta	3–4 (a.e.t.)	Arema Malang
Fatecha 12'; Batoum 57' (pen.); Kurniawan 89'	Report	Hita 20'; Firman 55', 86', 96'

Gelora Bung Karno Stadium, Jakarta
Attendance: 55,000
Referee: Jajat Sudrajat

Persija Jakarta
Arema Malang

Persija Jakarta: 5-3-2
GK	33	(Indonesia) Mukti Ali Raja
DF	4	(Indonesia) Charis Yulianto
DF	6	(Indonesia) Ortizan Solossa	(substituted off) 93'
DF	7	(Indonesia) Aris Indarto (c)	(yellow card) 62' (yellow-red card) 77'
DF	14	(Indonesia) Ismed Sofyan	(yellow card) 119'
DF	23	(Indonesia) Hamka Hamzah
MF	9	(Indonesia) Francis Wewengkang
MF	17	(Brazil) Deca dos Santos	(yellow card) 59'	(substituted off) 67'
MF	19	(Argentina) Lorenzo Cabanas	(yellow card) 23'	(substituted off) 87'
FW	24	(Paraguay) Adolfo Fatecha	(yellow card) 88'
FW	29	(Cameroon) Roger Batoum
Substitutes:
GK	1	(Indonesia) Hendro Kartiko
DF	2	(Indonesia) Mulki Alif Hakim
DF	16	(Indonesia) Dedi Sutrisno	(substituted in) 93'
MF	8	(Indonesia) Agus Supriyanto	(substituted in) 67'
FW	10	(Indonesia) Kurniawan Dwi Yulianto	(substituted in) 87'
FW	25	(Indonesia) Nur Ichsan
FW	77	(Indonesia) Jainal Ichwan
Manager:
(Moldova) Arcan Iurie

Arema Malang: 3-5–2
GK	20	(Indonesia) Silas Ohee
DF	5	(Indonesia) Warsidi Ardi	(yellow card) 28'
DF	6	(Brazil) Claudio Jesus
DF	29	(Indonesia) Sunar Sulaiman
MF	2	(Indonesia) Alexander Pulalo	(yellow card) 33' (yellow-red card) 67'
MF	3	(Indonesia) Erol Iba	(yellow card) 83'
MF	14	(Indonesia) I Putu Gede (c)	(yellow card) 17'
MF	15	(Indonesia) Firman Utina
MF	22	(Brazil) Joao Carlos Quintao	(substituted off) 88'
FW	9	(Argentina) Franco Hita	(substituted off) 99'
FW	28	(Cameroon) Emaleu Serge	(substituted off) 90'
Substitutes:
GK	1	(Indonesia) Kurnia Sandy
DF	11	(Indonesia) Firman Basuki
DF	18	(Indonesia) Aris Budi Prasetyo
MF	17	(Indonesia) Zainuri	(substituted in) 88'
MF	25	(Indonesia) Arif Suyono
FW	19	(Indonesia) Marthen Tao	(substituted in) 99'
FW	30	(Cameroon) Francis Yonga	(substituted in) 90'
Manager:
(Indonesia) Benny Dollo

Man of the Match:
(Indonesia) Firman Utina (Arema Malang)

== See also ==
- 2005 Copa Indonesia
