= 2006 Copa Indonesia final =

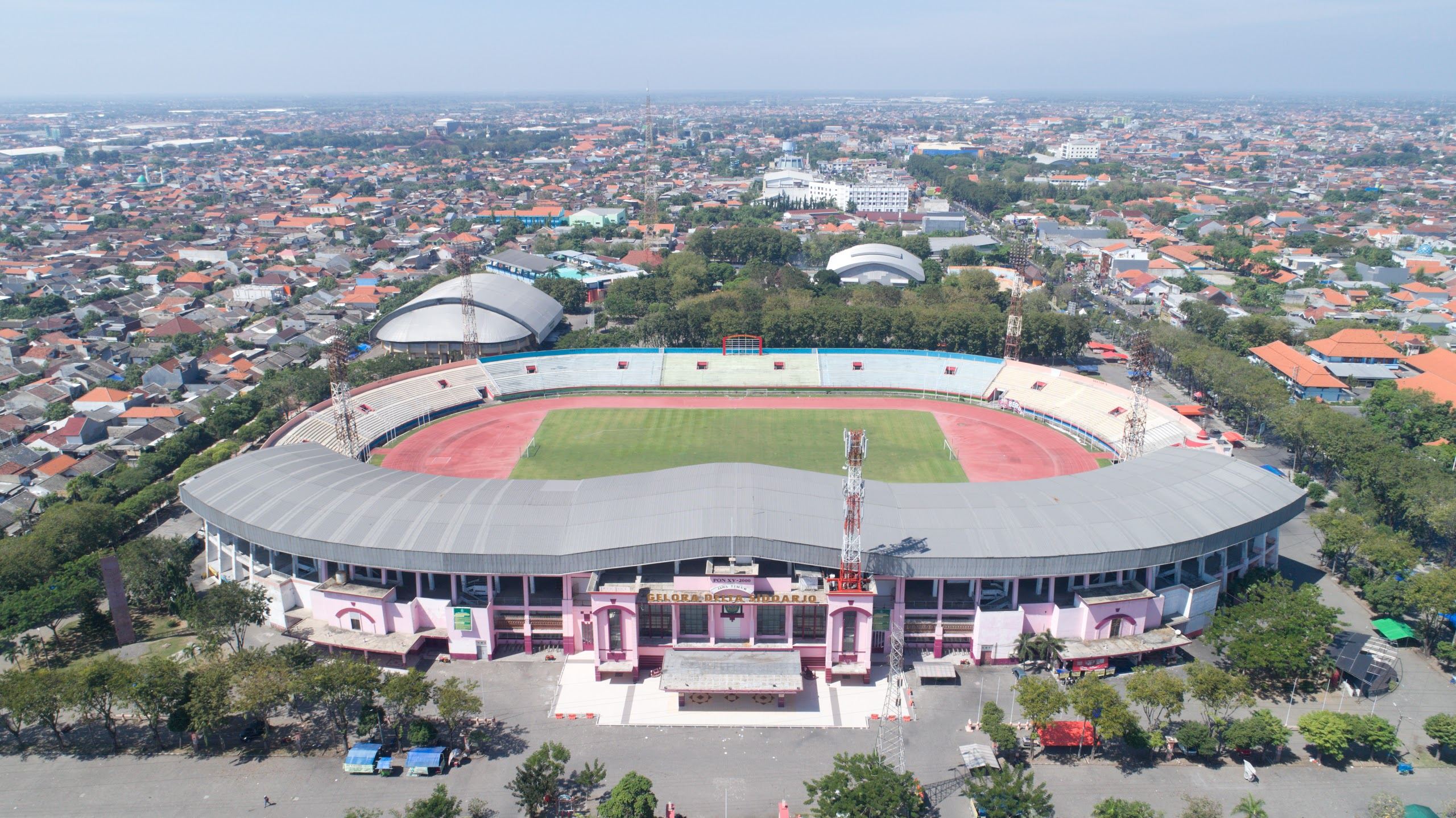
- The final was played at Gelora Delta Stadium.
- Event: 2006 Copa Indonesia
Arema Malang	Persipura Jayapura
2	0
- Date: 16 September 2006
- Venue: Gelora Delta Stadium, Sidoarjo
- Man of the Match: Aris Budi Prasetyo (Arema Malang)
- Referee: Jimmy Napitupulu
- Attendance: 20,000
- Weather: Fine

The 2006 Copa Indonesia final was a football match that took place on 16 September 2006 at Gelora Delta Stadium in Sidoarjo. It was the second final of Piala Indonesia and contested by final debutants Persipura Jayapura and title holders Arema Malang. Arema successfully defended their title with a 2–0 win and gained entry to the 2007 AFC Champions League group stage.

== Road to the final ==
Note: In all results below, the score of the finalist is given first (H: home; A: away).

Arema Malang				Round	Persipura Jayapura			
Opponent	Agg.	1st leg	2nd leg	Round	Opponent	Agg.	1st leg	2nd leg
Persipro Probolinggo	6–0	2–0 (A)	4–0 (H)	First round	Persipare Parepare	7–0	5–0 (H)	2–0 (A)
Persekaba Badung	2–1	2–0 (H)	0–1 (A)	Second round	Persiba Balikpapan	4–2	4–0 (H)	0–2 (A)
Persipur Purwodadi	6–0	4–0 (H)	2–0 (A)	Third round	Persikab Bandung	3–0	2–0 (H)	1–0 (A)
Persebaya Surabaya	1–0	1–0 (H)	0–0 (A)	Quarter-finals	Deltras Sidoarjo	3–2	2–1 (H)	1–1 (A)
PSMS Medan	5–3	1–1 (A)	4–2 (H)	Semi-finals	Persija Jakarta	3–1	1–1 (A)	2–0 (H)

== Match details ==
16 September 2006
19:00 WIB

Arema Malang	2–0	Persipura Jayapura
Aris Budi 51' (pen.); Ballah 58'	Report

Gelora Delta Stadium, Sidoarjo
Attendance: 20,000
Referee: Jimmy Napitupulu

Arema Malang
Persipura Jayapura

Arema Malang: 3-5–2
GK	31	(Indonesia) Achmad Kurniawan
DF	4	(Cameroon) Andela Atangana	(substituted off) 75'
DF	18	(Indonesia) Aris Budi Prasetyo
DF	23	(Indonesia) Akira Leonard Soputan	(yellow card) 31'
MF	2	(Indonesia) Alexander Pulalo
MF	3	(Indonesia) Erol Iba
MF	10	(Liberia) Anthony Ballah	(yellow card) 59'	(substituted off) 87'
MF	14	(Indonesia) I Putu Gede (c)	(yellow card) 52'
MF	27	(Indonesia) Sutaji
FW	11	(Cameroon) Emaleu Serge
FW	19	(Indonesia) Marthen Tao	(substituted off) 79'
Substitutes:
GK	1	(Indonesia) Kurnia Sandy
DF	5	(Indonesia) Warsidi Ardi	(substituted on) 75'
DF	16	(Indonesia) Rasmoyo
DF	29	(Indonesia) Sunar Sulaiman
MF	15	(Indonesia) Firman Utina	(substituted on) 79'
MF	22	(Brazil) Joao Carlos Quintao	(substituted on) 87'
MF	25	(Indonesia) Arif Suyono
Manager:
(Indonesia) Benny Dollo

Persipura Jayapura: 3-5-2
GK	1	(Indonesia) Yandri Pitoy
DF	4	(Indonesia) Ricardo Salampessy	(yellow card) 89'
DF	14	(Indonesia) Jack Komboy
DF	17	(Indonesia) Maully Lessy	(yellow card) 53'
MF	6	(Brazil) David da Rocha
MF	10	(Indonesia) Eduard Ivakdalam (c)
MF	23	(Cameroon) Nsangue Raymond	(substituted off) 71'
MF	24	(Indonesia) Christian Warobay	(yellow card) 64'
MF	32	(Nigeria) Victor Igbonefo	(yellow card) 57'
FW	9	(Chile) Cristian Carrasco	(substituted off) 13'
FW	12	(Indonesia) Korinus Fingkreuw
Substitutes:
GK	20	(Indonesia) Edy Rosady
DF	5	(Indonesia) Ardiles Rumbiak
DF	18	(Indonesia) Ridwan Bauw
MF	8	(Cameroon) Kalamen Yves	(substituted on) 71'
MF	15	(Indonesia) Paulo Rumere
MF	16	(Indonesia) Imanuel Wanggai
FW	19	(Indonesia) Anthon Roni Mahuse	(substituted on) 13'
Manager:
(Indonesia) Mettu Duaramuri

Man of the Match:
(Indonesia) Aris Budi Prasetyo (Arema Malang)
