= 2005 Liga Indonesia Premier Division final =

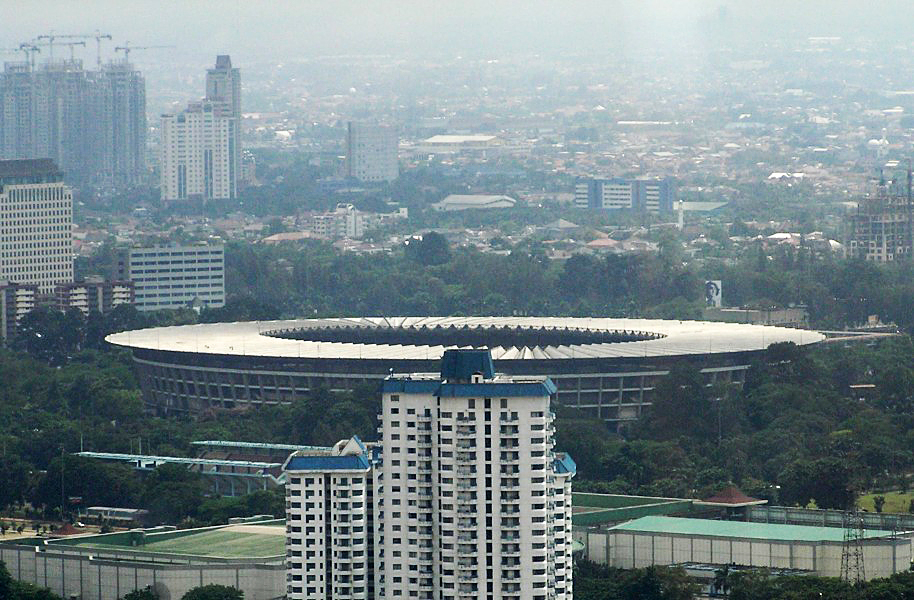
- The final was played at Gelora Bung Karno Stadium.
- Event: 2005 Liga Indonesia Premier Division
| Persija Jakarta | Persipura Jayapura |
| 2 | 3 |
- After extra time
- Date: 25 September 2005
- Venue: Gelora Bung Karno Stadium, Jakarta
- Referee: Purwanto
- Attendance: 80,000
- Weather: Fine

The 2005 Liga Indonesia Premier Division final was a football match which was played on 25 September 2005 at Gelora Bung Karno Stadium in Jakarta. It was contested by Persija Jakarta and Persipura Jayapura to determine the winner of the 2005 Liga Indonesia Premier Division. Persipura won the match 3–2 after 120 minutes to claim their first-ever professional title.

== Road to the final ==
Persija Jakarta
Round
Persipura Jayapura
Main article: 2005 Liga Indonesia Premier Division first stage: West Region

| Pos | Team | Pld | W | D | L | GF | GA | GD | Pts |
|---|---|---|---|---|---|---|---|---|---|
| 1 | Persija Jakarta | 26 | 15 | 4 | 7 | 42 | 21 | +21 | 49 |
| 2 | Arema Malang | 26 | 13 | 7 | 6 | 42 | 20 | +22 | 46 |
| 3 | PSIS Semarang | 26 | 10 | 12 | 4 | 36 | 21 | +15 | 42 |
| 4 | PSMS Medan | 26 | 12 | 6 | 8 | 30 | 26 | +4 | 42 |
| 5 | Persib Bandung | 26 | 10 | 8 | 8 | 32 | 26 | +6 | 38 |
| 6 | Persekabpas Pasuruan | 26 | 11 | 4 | 11 | 30 | 37 | −7 | 37 |
| 7 | PSS Sleman | 26 | 10 | 4 | 12 | 22 | 32 | −10 | 34 |
| 8 | Persita Tangerang | 26 | 8 | 8 | 10 | 31 | 26 | +5 | 32 |
| 9 | Sriwijaya FC | 26 | 9 | 5 | 12 | 30 | 34 | −4 | 32 |
| 10 | Semen Padang | 26 | 9 | 5 | 12 | 24 | 30 | −6 | 32 |
| 11 | Persikota Tangerang | 26 | 7 | 10 | 9 | 25 | 35 | −10 | 31 |
| 12 | PSDS Deli Serdang | 26 | 8 | 6 | 12 | 32 | 45 | −13 | 30 |
| 13 | Deltras Sidoarjo | 26 | 7 | 8 | 11 | 33 | 43 | −10 | 29 |
| 14 | PSPS Pekanbaru | 26 | 6 | 7 | 13 | 29 | 42 | −13 | 25 |

Source: RSSSF
First stage
Main article: 2005 Liga Indonesia Premier Division first stage: East Region

| Pos | Team | Pld | W | D | L | GF | GA | GD | Pts |
|---|---|---|---|---|---|---|---|---|---|
| 1 | Persipura Jayapura | 26 | 14 | 4 | 8 | 31 | 17 | +14 | 46 |
| 2 | PSM Makassar | 26 | 14 | 3 | 9 | 42 | 29 | +13 | 45 |
| 3 | Persik Kediri | 26 | 13 | 4 | 9 | 44 | 28 | +16 | 43 |
| 4 | Persebaya Surabaya | 26 | 12 | 7 | 7 | 31 | 22 | +9 | 43 |
| 5 | Persiba Balikpapan | 26 | 13 | 2 | 11 | 29 | 26 | +3 | 41 |
| 6 | PKT Bontang | 26 | 10 | 6 | 10 | 29 | 32 | −3 | 36 |
| 7 | Persema Malang | 26 | 11 | 3 | 12 | 30 | 34 | −4 | 36 |
| 8 | Persela Lamongan | 26 | 9 | 8 | 9 | 27 | 29 | −2 | 35 |
| 9 | Persmin Minahasa | 26 | 10 | 4 | 12 | 24 | 28 | −4 | 34 |
| 10 | Persegi Gianyar | 26 | 10 | 4 | 12 | 27 | 37 | −10 | 34 |
| 11 | Persibom Bolaang Mongondow | 26 | 10 | 4 | 12 | 21 | 30 | −9 | 34 |
| 12 | Persijap Jepara | 26 | 7 | 9 | 10 | 25 | 29 | −4 | 30 |
| 13 | Pelita Krakatau Steel | 26 | 8 | 5 | 13 | 28 | 38 | −10 | 29 |
| 14 | Petrokimia Putra | 26 | 7 | 5 | 14 | 32 | 41 | −9 | 26 |

Source: RSSSF
Main article: 2005 Liga Indonesia Premier Division second stage: Group A

| Pos | Team | Pld | W | D | L | GF | GA | GD | Pts |
|---|---|---|---|---|---|---|---|---|---|
| 1 | Persija Jakarta | 3 | 2 | 1 | 0 | 5 | 1 | +4 | 7 |
| 2 | PSIS Semarang | 3 | 2 | 0 | 1 | 3 | 1 | +2 | 6 |
| 3 | PSM Makassar | 3 | 0 | 2 | 1 | 3 | 5 | −2 | 2 |
| 4 | Persebaya Surabaya | 3 | 0 | 1 | 2 | 2 | 6 | −4 | 1 |

Source: RSSSF
Second stage
Main article: 2005 Liga Indonesia Premier Division second stage: Group B

| Pos | Team | Pld | W | D | L | GF | GA | GD | Pts |
|---|---|---|---|---|---|---|---|---|---|
| 1 | Persipura Jayapura | 3 | 3 | 0 | 0 | 3 | 0 | +3 | 9 |
| 2 | PSMS Medan | 3 | 1 | 1 | 1 | 2 | 2 | 0 | 4 |
| 3 | Persik Kediri | 3 | 1 | 0 | 2 | 3 | 3 | 0 | 3 |
| 4 | Arema Malang | 3 | 0 | 1 | 2 | 0 | 3 | −3 | 1 |

Source: RSSSF

== Match details ==
25 September 2005
19:00 WIB

| Persija Jakarta | 2–3 (a.e.t.) | Persipura Jayapura |
|---|---|---|
| Agus 10'; Wewengkang 55' | | Boaz 18'; Fingkreuw 82'; Kabes 101' |

Gelora Bung Karno Stadium, Jakarta
Attendance: 80,000
Referee: Purwanto

Persija Jakarta
Persipura Jayapura

| GK | 1 | (Indonesia) Hendro Kartiko |
| CB | 23 | (Indonesia) Hamka Hamzah |
| CB | 7 | (Indonesia) Aris Indarto |
| CB | 5 | (Indonesia) Charis Yulianto |
| DM | 17 | (Brazil) Jaldecir dos Santos |
| RM | 14 | (Indonesia) Ismed Sofyan |
| CM | 11 | (Indonesia) Agus Indra Kurniawan | (substituted off) 22' |
| CM | 19 | (Paraguay) Lorenzo Cabanas | (substituted off) 80' |
| LM | 26 | (Indonesia) Ortizan Solossa |
| CF | 29 | (Cameroon) Roger Batoum |
| CF | 24 | (Paraguay) Adolfo Fatecha |
Substitutes:
| MF | | (Indonesia) Francis Wewengkang | (substituted on) 22' |
| MF | | (Indonesia) Mulki Hakim | (substituted on) 80' |
Head Coach:
(Moldova) Arcan Iurie

| GK | 1 | (Indonesia) Jendri Pitoy |
| RWB | 24 | (Indonesia) Christian Warobay |
| CB | 14 | (Indonesia) Jack Komboy |
| CB | 17 | (Indonesia) Mauli Lessy |
| CB | 32 | (Nigeria) Victor Igbonefo |
| LWB | 18 | (Indonesia) Ridwan Bauw | (substituted off) 45' |
| DM | 7 | (Indonesia) Marwal Iskandar |
| AM | 10 | (Indonesia) Eduard Ivakdalam |
| AM | 9 | (Cameroon) Erick Mabengga |
| CF | 26 | (Indonesia) Boaz Solossa | (substituted off) 70' |
| CF | 21 | (Cameroon) Christian Lenglolo | (substituted off) 75' |
Substitutes:
| MF | 13 | (Indonesia) Ian Kabes | (substituted on) 45' |
| MF | 23 | (Cameroon) Victor Sergio | (substituted on) 75' |
| FW | 12 | (Indonesia) Korinus Fingkreuw | (substituted on) 70' |
Head Coach:
(Indonesia) Rahmad Darmawan
