= 2001 Liga Indonesia Premier Division final =

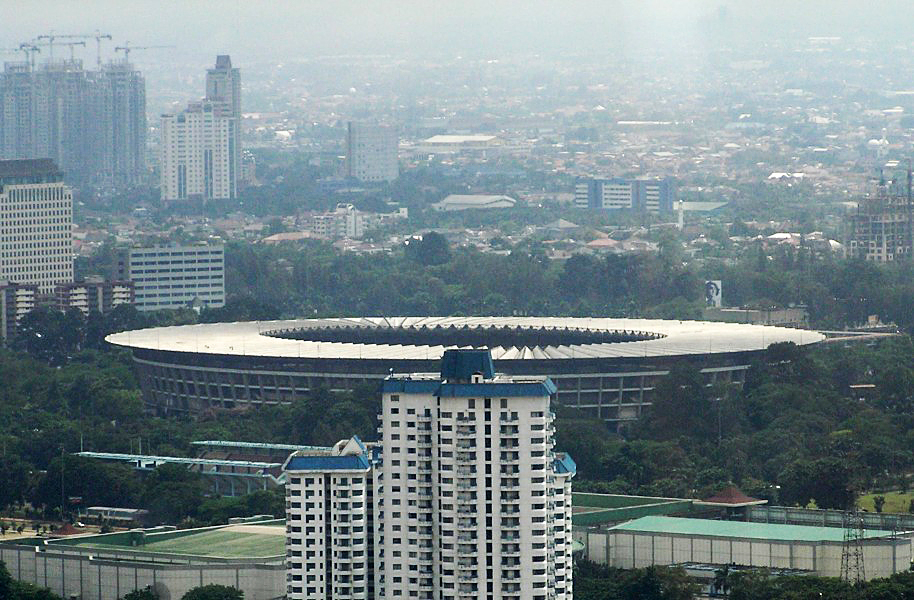
- The final was played at Gelora Bung Karno Stadium.
- Event: 2001 Liga Indonesia Premier Division
| PSM Makassar | Persija Jakarta |
| 2 | 3 |
- Date: 7 October 2001
- Venue: Gelora Bung Karno Stadium, Jakarta
- Referee: Aris Munandar
- Attendance: 60,000
- Weather: Fine

The 2001 Liga Indonesia Premier Division final was a football match which was played on 7 October 2001 at Gelora Bung Karno Stadium in Jakarta. It was contested by PSM Makassar and Persija Jakarta to determine the winner of the 2001 Liga Indonesia Premier Division. Persija won the match 3–2 to claim their first-ever professional title.

== Road to the final ==
| PSM Makassar | | Round | Persija Jakarta | |
|---|---|---|---|---|
| Main article: 2001 Liga Indonesia Premier Division first stage: East Region: Pos / Team / Pld / W / D / L / GF / GA / GD / Pts; 1 / PSM Makassar / 25 / 16 / 6 / 3 / 36 / 12 / +24 / 54; 2 / Persebaya Surabaya / 25 / 15 / 6 / 4 / 44 / 11 / +33 / 51; 3 / Arema Malang / 25 / 14 / 4 / 7 / 29 / 23 / +6 / 46; 4 / Barito Putra / 25 / 12 / 7 / 6 / 32 / 22 / +10 / 43; 5 / Pupuk Kaltim / 25 / 12 / 2 / 11 / 34 / 29 / +5 / 38; 6 / Petrokimia Putra / 25 / 8 / 10 / 7 / 34 / 30 / +4 / 34; 7 / Persema Malang United / 25 / 8 / 9 / 8 / 23 / 24 / −1 / 33; 8 / Persipura Jayapura / 25 / 10 / 2 / 13 / 30 / 37 / −7 / 32; 9 / Gelora Delta Putra Sidoarjo / 25 / 6 / 9 / 10 / 26 / 35 / −9 / 27; 10 / PSS Sleman / 25 / 8 / 3 / 14 / 22 / 40 / −18 / 27; 11 / Pelita Solo / 25 / 7 / 4 / 14 / 33 / 35 / −2 / 25; 12 / Persijap Jepara / 25 / 6 / 5 / 14 / 27 / 46 / −19 / 23; 13 / Persma Manado / 25 / 6 / 5 / 14 / 21 / 39 / −18 / 23; 14 / ~~Putra Samarinda~~ / 13 / 4 / 2 / 7 / 13 / 21 / −8 / 14; Source: RSSSF | | First stage | Main article: 2001 Liga Indonesia Premier Division first stage: West Region: Pos / Team / Pld / W / D / L / GF / GA / GD / Pts; 1 / PSMS Medan / 26 / 16 / 4 / 6 / 38 / 24 / +14 / 52; 2 / Persija Jakarta / 26 / 15 / 6 / 5 / 47 / 18 / +29 / 51; 3 / Persib Bandung / 26 / 15 / 2 / 9 / 23 / 18 / +5 / 47; 4 / Persita Tangerang / 26 / 13 / 3 / 10 / 39 / 28 / +11 / 42; 5 / Persikota Tangerang / 26 / 11 / 8 / 7 / 37 / 22 / +15 / 41; 6 / PSPS Pekanbaru / 26 / 10 / 10 / 6 / 27 / 24 / +3 / 40; 7 / PS Semen Padang / 26 / 9 / 9 / 8 / 35 / 26 / +9 / 36; 8 / Persijatim Jakarta FC / 26 / 9 / 7 / 10 / 30 / 36 / −6 / 34; 9 / PSBL Bandar Lampung / 26 / 8 / 8 / 10 / 28 / 30 / −2 / 32; 10 / PSDS Deli Serdang / 26 / 7 / 8 / 11 / 24 / 33 / −9 / 29; 11 / Persikab / 26 / 7 / 8 / 11 / 26 / 36 / −10 / 29; 12 / Persiraja Banda Aceh / 26 / 6 / 7 / 13 / 27 / 49 / −22 / 25; 13 / PSP Padang / 26 / 6 / 4 / 16 / 22 / 36 / −14 / 22; 14 / Persikabo Bogor / 26 / 5 / 6 / 15 / 22 / 45 / −23 / 21; Source: RSSSF | |
| Main article: 2001 Liga Indonesia Premier Division second stage: Group B: Pos / Team / Pld / W / D / L / GF / GA / GD / Pts; 1 / Persija Jakarta / 3 / 2 / 1 / 0 / 5 / 3 / +2 / 7; 2 / PSM Makassar / 3 / 2 / 0 / 1 / 4 / 1 / +3 / 6; 3 / Persita Tangerang / 3 / 1 / 1 / 1 / 6 / 4 / +2 / 4; 4 / Arema Malang / 3 / 0 / 0 / 3 / 2 / 9 / −7 / 0; Source: RSSSF | | Second stage | Main article: 2001 Liga Indonesia Premier Division second stage: Group B: Pos / Team / Pld / W / D / L / GF / GA / GD / Pts; 1 / Persija Jakarta / 3 / 2 / 1 / 0 / 5 / 3 / +2 / 7; 2 / PSM Makassar / 3 / 2 / 0 / 1 / 4 / 1 / +3 / 6; 3 / Persita Tangerang / 3 / 1 / 1 / 1 / 6 / 4 / +2 / 4; 4 / Arema Malang / 3 / 0 / 0 / 3 / 2 / 9 / −7 / 0; Source: RSSSF | |
| Opponent | Result | Knockout stage | Opponent | Result |
| PSMS Medan | 2–2 (3–2 pen.) | Semifinals | Persebaya Surabaya | 2–1 |

== Match details ==
7 October 2001
17:30 WIB

| PSM Makassar | 2–3 | Persija Jakarta |
|---|---|---|
| Bento 65' (pen.); Kurniawan 80' | Report | Imran 3'; Bambang 42', 47' |

Gelora Bung Karno Stadium, Jakarta
Attendance: 60,000
Referee: Aris Munandar

PSM Makassar
Persija Jakarta

PSM Makassar:
| GK | 20 | (Indonesia) Hendro Kartiko |
| CB | 23 | (Indonesia) Ronny Ririn |
| CB | 19 | (Cameroon) Yoseph Lewono |
| CB | 14 | (Indonesia) Syamsuddin Batolla | (substituted off) 40' |
| RM | 26 | (Indonesia) Ortizan Solossa |
| MF | 22 | (Brazil) Carlos de Mello |
| MF | 11 | (Indonesia) Bima Sakti (c) |
| LM | 15 | (Indonesia) Alexander Pulalo | (substituted off) 60' |
| CF | 9 | (Indonesia) Miro Baldo Bento |
| CF | 17 | (Indonesia) Kurniawan Dwi Yulianto |
| CF | 5 | (Indonesia) Iswadi |
Substitutes:
| MF | 12 | (Indonesia) Yuniarto Budi | (substituted on) 40' |
| FW | 16 | (Indonesia) Rachman Usman | (substituted on) 60' |
Head Coach:
(Indonesia) Syamsuddin Umar

Persija Jakarta:
| GK | 27 | (Cameroon) Mbeng Jean Mambalou |
| CB | 19 | (Indonesia) Nur'alim |
| CB | 23 | (Brazil) Antonio Claudio |
| CB | 5 | (Indonesia) Warsidi Ardi |
| CB | 6 | (Indonesia) Joko Kuspito |
| MF | 4 | (Indonesia) Agus Suprianto |
| MF | 10 | (Brazil) Luciano Leandro |
| MF | 16 | (Indonesia) Imran Nahumarury | (substituted off) 35' |
| MF | 2 | (Indonesia) Budiman Yunus (c) |
| CF | 22 | (Indonesia) Gendut Doni | (substituted off) 77' |
| CF | 20 | (Indonesia) Bambang Pamungkas |
Substitutes:
| MF | 14 | (Indonesia) Dedi Umarella | (substituted on) 35' |
| FW | 7 | (Indonesia) Widodo Putro | (substituted on) 77' |
Head Coach:
(Indonesia) Sofyan Hadi
