= Erol Iba =

Indonesian footballer

Personal information
- Full name: Erol Fransiscus Xaverius Iba
- Date of birth: 6 August 1979 (age 47)
- Place of birth: Jayapura, Indonesia
- Height: 1.70 m (5 ft 7 in)
- Positions: Left back; left winger

Team information
- Current team: PSBS Biak (assistant)

Youth career
- 1994–97: Diklat Papua
- 1997–98: Diklat Ragunan

Senior career*
Years	Team	Apps	(Gls)
1998–2002	Semen Padang		
2002–2004	PSPS Pekanbaru		
2004–2006	Arema Malang		
2006–2008	Persik Kediri	32	(1)
2008–2009	Pelita Jaya		
2009–2010	Persipura Jayapura	14	(0)
2010–2012	Persebaya Surabaya	38	(2)
2012–2013	Persegres Gresik United	17	(1)
2013–2014	Sriwijaya	16	(0)
2014–2015	Persepam Madura Utama	17	(0)

International career
2001	Indonesia U23		
2006–2009	Indonesia	17	(0)

Managerial career
- 2018: Persitelbin Teluk Bintuni (head coach)
- 2020: Persiba Balikpapan (assistant)
- 2022–2023: Persipura Jayapura (assistant)
- 2023–: PSBS Biak (assistant)
- * Club domestic league appearances and goals

Erol Iba (born in Jayapura, Irian Jaya, 6 August 1979) is an Indonesian former professional footballer. Best known for his speed, he was also noted for dribbling, passing and aggressiveness. He is currently the assistant manager of the PSBS Biak.

== Club career ==
Starting his football career in Papua Training and Education Center, Erol moved to Ragunan Training and Education Center in 1997. There he spent one year, before joining with football club from West Sumatera which played in Indonesian League, Semen Padang, in 1998. In this club, where he spent four years, Erol was remarked as one of the most talented Indonesian wing backs. The young star took his club as top ten club in the competition in 2000, and in 2001 he took Semen Padang to the semifinal phase of Indonesian league. His abilities soon attracted many clubs to sign him. In 2002, he signed a one-year contract with PSPS Pekanbaru, a club that was forming a dream team by signing many of Indonesian's famous players such as Kurniawan Dwi Yulianto and Bima Sakti.
However, he failed to repeat his good performance in Semen Padang as well as the club failed to be the top flight in the league.
Despite his poor performance, Erol was signed by Benny Dollo, currently the coach of Indonesian football team, who was at that time, the coach of Arema Malang, in which Erol spent three years from 2003 to 2006.

In this club Erol proved his talent by taking the club to become the champion of Copa Indonesia in both 2005 and 2006.
Later on he joined Persik Kediri after the departure of Benny Dollo from Arema Malang. In 2007 Erol signed a deal with Pelita Jaya joining Fandi Ahmad, the ex–Singapore most famous striker, who is coaching for the club.
His form attracted attention from current A-League side Sydney FC.

After 11 years playing in several clubs outside Papua, Erol, in 2009, return to his hometown playing for Persipura Jayapura, the 2 times Champion of Indonesian Super League. He said that this was every Papua player's dream to be in the Persipura Jayapura Squad. His success in Indonesia League breaks a negative thought saying that Papuan players often fail when they are playing for another clubs outside Papua.

More interest came from A-League sides, this time Newcastle Jets, and Erol was linked with the Australian Side.

In January 2015, he signed with Persepam Madura United.

== International career ==
He has played for the Indonesia national football team. His first International debut in a senior national team squad was on 23 August 2006 at the 2006 Merdeka Tournament. There he played for Indonesia against Malaysia, where the teams tied 1-1. At Asian Cup 2007 he just played one time as a substitution player when Indonesia lost 0–1 to South Korea in the last game in group D.

National team career:

- 2001: Pre Asian Cup (selection), SEA Games XI Kuala Lumpur(U-23)
- 2006: Brunei Merdeka Games, BV International Cup
- 2007: AFF Championship, Asian Cup

== Honours ==
Arema Malang

- Liga Indonesia First Division: 2004
- Copa Indonesia: 2005, 2006
