= Sutaji =

Indonesian footballer

Personal information
- Full name: Sutaji
- Date of birth: 18 January 1975 (age 51)
- Place of birth: Sidoarjo, Indonesia
- Height: 1.68 m (5 ft 6 in)
- Position: Midfielder

Senior career*
Years	Team	Apps	(Gls)
1995–1998	Persebaya Surabaya	20	(0)
1998–2002	PSS Sleman	28	(1)
2002–2004	Deltras Sidoarjo	43	(3)
2004–2008	Arema Malang	15	(0)
2008–2015	Persema Malang	76	(8)
Total		182	(12)
- * Club domestic league appearances and goals

Sutaji (born 18 January 1975) is an Indonesian former footballer who plays as a midfielder.

== Honours ==
Persebaya Surabaya

- Liga Indonesia Premier Division: 1996–97

Arema Malang

- Copa Indonesia: 2005, 2006

Persema Malang

- Liga Indonesia Premier Division runner up: 2008–09
