= Putu Gede Suwi Santoso =

Indonesian footballer and manager

Personal information
- Full name: I Putu Gede Suwi Santoso
- Date of birth: 1 December 1973 (age 52)
- Place of birth: Denpasar, Indonesia
- Height: 1.71 m (5 ft 7 in)
- Position: Midfielder

Team information
- Current team: Persekat Tegal (head coach)

Senior career*
| Years | Team | Apps | (Gls) |
| 1994–1996 | Persebaya Surabaya | | |
| 1996–1997 | Mitra Surabaya | | |
| 1997–1999 | Persija Jakarta | | |
| 1999–2001 | Arema Malang | | |
| 2002–2003 | Deltras Sidoarjo | | |
| 2004–2006 | Arema Malang | | |
| 2007–2008 | Persita Tangerang | | |
| 2008 | Persebaya Surabaya | | |
| 2008–2009 | Persekabpas | | |
| 2010–2012 | Persipro Probolinggo | 52 | (11) |

International career
| 2000–2004 | Indonesia | 18 | (0) |

Managerial career
- 2013: Persipro Probolinggo (assistant)
- 2014: PSBK Blitar
- 2017: Persibo Bojonegoro
- 2018: Perseru Serui
- 2019: Babel United
- 2020: PSG Gresik
- 2021: Persekat Tegal
- 2022: PSS Sleman
- 2022–2023: PSMS Medan
- 2023: Arema (caretaker)
- 2023: Arema (assistant coach)
- 2023–2024: Persikab Bandung
- 2024: Persibo Bojonegoro
- 2024–: Persekat Tegal
- * Club domestic league appearances and goals

I Putu Gede Suwi Santoso (born in Denpasar, 1 December 1973) is an Indonesian former footballer. He played as a defensive midfielder. His name Suwi is derived from the first syllable of his father's and mother's name.

In 2007, Putu Gede moved to Persita Tangerang from Arema Malang, following Benny Dollo, Arema's coach who helped winning Piala Indonesia twice. In Arema, Putu became a captain and helped this club win Piala Indonesia in 2005 and 2006. Like Ansyari Lubis, he has much experience, flying hours, and leadership. With his position Putu look very easy contents of field when his team attack although get pressure from enemy's team.

As a captain he is not typical, he often provocated from the opponent or enemy in the field. However, he still have an own-plus, he can firing spirits his club teammates for winning a match.

After retiring from playing in 2012, Putu Gede was appointed assistant head coach of his last club Persipro Probolinggo in 2013. He was appointed head coach of PSBK Blitar in 2014. in 2017, I Putu Gede take charge of Persibo Bojonegoro as a head coach.

Putu Gede is a former Indonesia national football team player.

== Honours ==
Arema Malang

- Liga Indonesia First Division: 2004
- Copa Indonesia: 2005, 2006

Indonesia

- AFF Championship runner-up: 2000, 2002
