= Jhonny Tagi =

Indonesian footballer

Personal information
- Full name: Jhonny Yunus Tagi
- Date of birth: 12 January 2001 (age 25)
- Place of birth: Nabire, Indonesia
- Height: 1.67 m (5 ft 6 in)
- Position: Midfielder

Youth career
- 2018: Persekaba Badung
- 2019–2020: Persipura Jayapura

Senior career*
Years	Team	Apps	(Gls)
2021	Persewar Waropen	8	(0)
2022	Persipura Jayapura	2	(0)
2022–2023	Persewar Waropen	4	(0)
2023–2024	Persipura Jayapura	1	(0)
- * Club domestic league appearances and goals as of 10 December 2023

Jhonny Yunus Tagi (born 12 January 2001) is an Indonesian professional footballer who plays as a midfielder.

== Club career ==
=== Persipura Jayapura ===
He was signed for Persipura Jayapura to play in Liga 1 in the 2021 season. Tagi made his league debut on 14 February 2022 as a substitute in a match against Barito Putera at the Kapten I Wayan Dipta Stadium, Gianyar.

== Career statistics ==
=== Club ===
As of 10 December 2023.

Club	Season	League			Cup		Other		Total	
Club	Season	Division	Apps	Goals	Apps	Goals	Apps	Goals	Apps	Goals
Persewar Waropen	2021	Liga 2	8	0	0	0	0	0	8	0
Persipura Jayapura	2021	Liga 1	2	0	0	0	0	0	2	0
Persewar Waropen	2022–23	Liga 2	4	0	0	0	0	0	4	0
Persipura Jayapura	2023–24	Liga 2	1	0	0	0	0	0	1	0
Career total			15	0	0	0	0	0	15	0
