= Sunar Sulaiman =

Indonesian footballer

Personal information
- Full name: Sunar Sulaiman
- Date of birth: 29 December 1979 (age 46)
- Place of birth: Makassar, Indonesia
- Height: 1.79 m (5 ft 10 1/2 in)
- Position: Defender

Senior career*
Years	Team	Apps	(Gls)
1997	PSM Makassar		
1998–2003	Barito Putra		
2004–07	Arema Malang		
2007–2009	Persela Lamongan		
2009–2010	Persita Tangerang		
2010–2012	Perseman Manokwari		
2013–2015	PSIS Semarang		

International career
2001	Indonesia U-23		
2000–2001	Indonesia		
- * Club domestic league appearances and goals

Sunar Sulaiman (born in Makassar, South Sulawesi 29 December 1979) is an Indonesian former footballer who plays as a defender.

== Career ==
Sunar Sulaiman was a member of the Indonesian Senior Team at the Kemerdekaan Cup in 2000.

He is also a former member of the Indonesia U-23 Team; the team won 4th Place at the 2001 Southeast Asian Games, losing 0–1 to the Myanmar U-23 Team. The event was held at Kuala Lumpur, Malaysia.

While with Arema Malang he helped the club win two consecutive Copa Indonesia Cups (2005 and 2006). In August 2007 he left Arema and moved to Persela Lamongan. He is currently with Persita Tangerang.

He played for Arema Malang in the 2007 AFC Champions League group stage.

== Honours ==
Arema Malang

- Liga Indonesia First Division: 2004
- Copa Indonesia: 2005, 2006
