= Jack Komboy =

Indonesian footballer

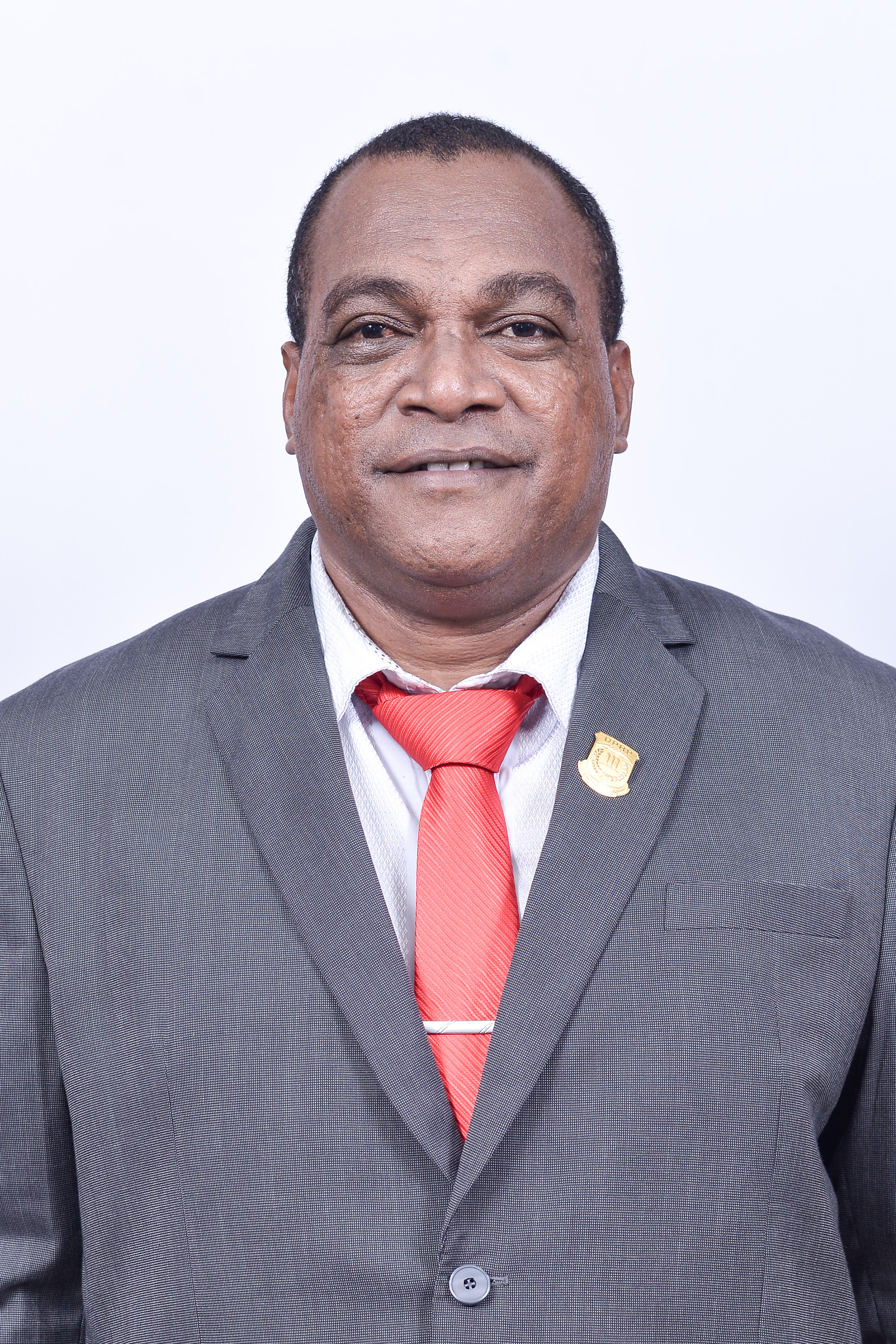
- Komboy in 2019

Personal information
- Full name: Kamasan Jakob Komboy
- Date of birth: 18 April 1977 (age 49)
- Place of birth: Jayapura, Indonesia
- Height: 1.75 m (5 ft 9 in)
- Position: Centre back

Youth career
- 1998: PS. Cenderawasih

Senior career*
| Years | Team | Apps | (Gls) |
| 1999–2003 | Persipura Jayapura | 90 | (0) |
| 2003–2004 | PSM Makassar | 27 | (2) |
| 2004–2010 | Persipura Jayapura | 80 | (3) |
| Total | | 197 | (5) |

International career
| 2004–2005 | Indonesia | 3 | (0) |
- * Club domestic league appearances and goals

Jack Komboy (born 18 April 1977 in Jayapura, Papua) is an Indonesian former footballer, he normally plays as a defender and his height 180 cm. Before he played for PSM Makassar, he played for Persipura Jayapura from 1998 to 2002 and he went back again to Persipura from 2005 until 2010. After retired as a footballer, he became a member of Provincial People's Representative Council (DPRP) in Papua.

== Honours ==
Persipura Jayapura

- Liga Indonesia Premier Division: 2005
- Indonesia Super League: 2008–09
- Indonesian Community Shield: 2009
- Copa Indonesia runner-up: 2006, 2007–08, 2008–09

Indonesia

- AFF Championship runner-up: 2004
