= Kurnia Sandy =

Indonesian footballer (born 1975)

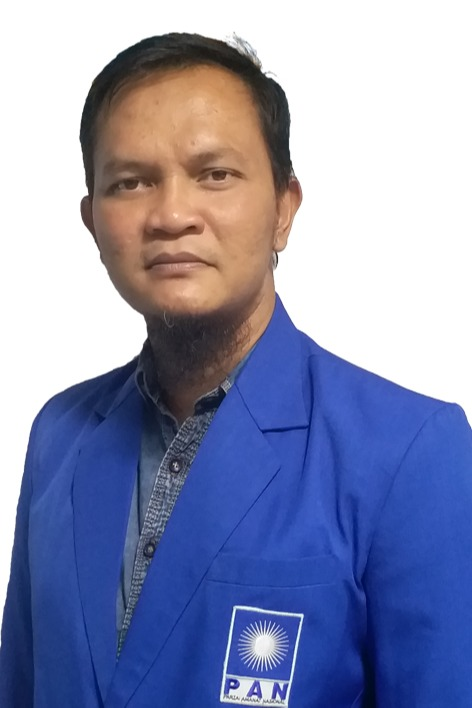

Personal information
- Full name: Kurnia Sandy
- Date of birth: 24 August 1975 (age 51)
- Place of birth: Semarang, Indonesia
- Height: 1.85 m (6 ft 1 in)
- Position: Goalkeeper

Team information
- Current team: Indonesia U17 (GK coach)

Youth career
- 1993: PSSI Primavera
- 1994: Sampdoria Primavera

Senior career*
Years	Team	Apps	(Gls)
1995–1996	Pelita Jaya	18	(0)
1996–1997	Sampdoria	0	(0)
1997–2000	Pelita Jaya	50	(0)
2000–2001	Persikabo Bogor	28	(0)
2001–2003	PSM Makassar	30	(0)
2003–2006	Arema Malang	76	(0)
2006–2008	Persik Kediri	45	(0)
2008–2009	Persebaya Surabaya	18	(0)
2009–2010	Mitra Kukar	19	(0)
2010–2011	Bandung F.C.	12	(0)
Total		298	(0)

International career
1995–1998	Indonesia	24	(0)

Managerial career
- 2013–2015: Frenz United (goalkeeper coach)
- 2016–2017: T-Team (goalkeeper coach)
- 2018: Sriwijaya (goalkeeper coach)
- 2018: Indonesia (goalkeeper coach)
- 2019–2021: Madura United (goalkeeper coach)
- 2021–2023: Indonesia (Women's) (goalkeeper coach)
- 2023: Indonesia U23 (goalkeeper coach)
- 2025–: PSPS Pekanbaru (goalkeeper coach)
- * Club domestic league appearances and goals

Kurnia Sandy (born 24 August 1975) is an Indonesian former footballer who played as a goalkeeper.

== Club career ==
Sandy played at Sampdoria's primavera (youth) team with Kurniawan Dwi Yulianto and Bima Sakti; unlike his teammates, Kurnia succeeded to break into the first team and became the fourth-choice goalkeeper for one season under coach Sven-Göran Eriksson. At one time when Sampdoria's first-choice goalkeeper Fabrizio Ferron was red-carded, Sampdoria attempted to promote Sandy into the first team as a backup for Matteo Sereni, but apparently, his management had yet to process Sandy's permit-related papers. Thus Sampdoria's entry was denied by the FIGC.

== International career ==
Sandy made a memorable performance during 1996 Asian Cup, where he denied at least six clear chance during the game against Kuwait, before rough contact against a Kuwaiti player injured him; the game eventually ended 2–2. Sandy's injury forced him to sit out the rest of the tournament. Due to second-choice goalkeeper Hendro Kartiko's fine performances, and Sandy's apparent dip in performance in the local league after his injury, Sandy lost the spot as first-choice goalkeeper for the national team.

== Honours ==
Arema Malang

- Liga Indonesia First Division: 2004
- Copa Indonesia: 2005, 2006

Indonesia

- SEA Games silver medal: 1997
- AFF Championship third place: 1998
