= Lorenzo Cabanas =

Paraguayan footballer (born 1979)

Personal information
- Full name: Lorenzo Guzman Cabanas Ayala
- Date of birth: 10 August 1979 (age 47)
- Place of birth: Ciudad del Este, Paraguay
- Height: 1.73 m (5 ft 8 in)
- Position: Midfielder

Senior career*
Years	Team	Apps	(Gls)
2005	Persija Jakarta		
2006	Persiba Balikpapan	24	(8)
2007–2009	Persib Bandung	60	(12)
- * Club domestic league appearances and goals

Lorenzo Guzman Cabanas Ayala (born 10 August 1979 in Ciudad del Este) is a Paraguayan former professional footballer that previously played for Persib Bandung in the Indonesia Super League.

== Honours ==
Persija Jakarta

- Liga Indonesia Premier Division runner up: 2005
- Copa Indonesia runner-up: 2005
