= Adolfo Fatecha =

Paraguayan footballer (born 1972)

Personal information
- Date of birth: 24 November 1972 (age 53)
- Place of birth: Asuncion, Paraguay
- Height: 1.74 m (5 ft 9 in)
- Position: Midfielder

Senior career*
Years	Team	Apps	(Gls)
1992–1999	Olimpia		
1997	→ Shanghai Shenhua (loan)		
2000	Deportes Puerto Montt		
2000	Deportes Temuco		
2001	Racing Club de Montevideo		
2002	3 de Febrero		
2003–2005	General Caballero	33	(12)
2004	→ Guaraní Antonio Franco (loan)	8	(2)
2005	Persija Jakarta		
2006	PSS Sleman		
2007	Rubio Ñu		
2008–2009	Sportivo Trinidense		
- * Club domestic league appearances and goals

Adolfo Fatecha (born 24 November 1972) is a Paraguayan former professional footballer who played as a midfielder for clubs in Paraguay, Uruguay, Argentina, Chile, China and Indonesia.

== Clubs ==
- Olimpia 1992–1996
- Shanghai Shenhua 1997
- Olimpia 1998–1999
- Deportes Puerto Montt 2000
- Deportes Temuco 2000
- Racing Club de Montevideo 2001
- 3 de Febrero 2002
- General Caballero 2003–2004
- Guaraní Antonio Franco 2004
- General Caballero 2005
- Persija Jakarta 2005
- PSS Sleman 2006
- Rubio Ñú 2007
- Sportivo Trinidense 2008–2009

== Honours ==
Olimpia

- Paraguayan Primera División: 1993, 1995, 1998, 1999

Persija Jakarta

- Liga Indonesia Premier Division runner up: 2005
- Copa Indonesia runner-up: 2005
