= Christian Warobay =

Indonesian footballer

Personal information
- Full name: Marthen Christian Warobay
- Date of birth: 12 July 1984 (age 42)
- Place of birth: Jayapura, Indonesia
- Height: 1.70 m (5 ft 7 in)
- Position: Right back

Youth career
- PON Papua

Senior career*
Years	Team	Apps	(Gls)
2004–2007	Persipura Jayapura	60	(0)
2007–2010	Sriwijaya	75	(0)
2010–2013	Persidafon Dafonsoro	48	(3)
Total		183	(3)

International career
2005–2007	Indonesia U-23	3	(0)
2005–2010	Indonesia	2	(0)
- * Club domestic league appearances and goals

Marthen Christian Warobay (born 12 July 1984) is an Indonesian former footballer who plays as a defender.

== International career ==
In 2007, he played to represent the Indonesia U-23, in 2007 SEA Games.

== Honours ==
Persipura Jayapura

- Liga Indonesia Premier Division: 2005
- Copa Indonesia runner-up: 2006

Sriwijaya

- Liga Indonesia Premier Division: 2007–08
- Copa Indonesia/Piala Indonesia: 2007–08, 2008–09, 2010

Individual

- Liga Indonesia Premier Division Best Player: 2005
