= Anthony Jomah Ballah =

Liberian former footballer

Anthony Ballah
Personal information
- Full name: Anthony Jomah Ballah
- Date of birth: 24 October 1979 (age 47)
- Place of birth: Lofa County, Liberia
- Height: 1.75 m (5 ft 9 in)
- Position: Midfielder

Senior career*
Years	Team	Apps	(Gls)
1998–1999	PSM Makassar	18	(2)
1999–2000	Gelora Dewata	19	(2)
1999–2000	PSIS Semarang	21	(3)
2001–2004	Persita Tangerang	56	(6)
2005	PSIS Semarang	34	(4)
2006–2007	Arema Malang	32	(8)
2007–2009	Persebaya Surabaya	18	(2)
2009–2011	PSIR Rembang	32	(2)
2011	Persitema Temanggung	26	(3)
Total		256	(32)

International career
2004–2008	Liberia	3	(0)
- * Club domestic league appearances and goals

Anthony Jomah Ballah (born 24 October 1979) is a Liberian former footballer.

== Honors ==
Persita Tangerang

- Liga Indonesia Premier Division runner up: 2002

Arema Malang

- Copa Indonesia: 2006
