= Korinus Fingkreuw =

Indonesian footballer (born 1983)

Personal information
- Full name: Korintus Koliopas Fingkreuw
- Date of birth: 14 February 1983 (age 43)
- Place of birth: Jayapura, Indonesia
- Height: 1.69 m (5 ft 6 1/2 in)
- Position: Winger

Senior career*
Years	Team	Apps	(Gls)
2004–2006	Persipura Jayapura	29	(5)
2006–2009	Sriwijaya	28	(3)
2009–2010	Persebaya Surabaya	27	(6)
2010–2011	PSM Makassar	9	(1)
2011–2012	Sriwijaya	8	(1)
2012–2014	Persidafon Dafonsoro	48	(9)
Total		147	(25)

International career
2005	Indonesia U-23		
- * Club domestic league appearances and goals

Korintus Koliopas Fingkreuw, better known as Korinus Fingkreuw (born 14 February 1983) is an Indonesian former footballer. Fingkreuw signed for Persipura in 2004, having come through their youth system. He has worked in the past with the Indonesian under-21 squad .In 2006, he moved to Sriwijaya FC along with his coach Rahmad Darmawan. In 2009, he signed with Persebaya Surabaya.

Good performance in the final of Liga Indonesia 2005, with one goal in the second half made the score a draw 2–2 against Persija, and the match had to be continued into extra time. In the extra time Persipura made another goal to win the Liga Indonesia title.

Fingkreuw was chosen for the Indonesia national team in Sea Games 2005, but the team failed to go to the semifinals.

== Honours ==
Persipura Jayapura

- Liga Indonesia Premier Division: 2005
- Copa Indonesia runner-up: 2006

Sriwijaya

- Liga Indonesia Premier Division: 2007–08
- Copa Indonesia: 2007–08, 2008–09
