= Alexander Pulalo =

Indonesian footballer

Personal information
- Full name: Alexander Pulalo
- Date of birth: 8 May 1973 (age 53)
- Place of birth: Jayapura, Indonesia
- Height: 1.65 m (5 ft 5 in)
- Position: Full-back

Senior career*
Years	Team	Apps	(Gls)
1993–1998	Semen Padang	120	(4)
1998–1999	Pelita Bakrie	22	(0)
1999–2001	PSM Makassar	48	(7)
2001–2002	PSIS Semarang	27	(0)
2002–2003	Persija Jakarta	30	(2)
2003–2004	Persib Bandung	21	(0)
2004–2009	Arema Malang	110	(5)
2009–2010	Semen Padang	19	(0)
2010–2011	Mitra Kukar	20	(1)
Total		417	(19)

International career
1993–2004	Indonesia	8	(0)
- * Club domestic league appearances and goals

Alexander Pulalo (born 8 May 1973) is an Indonesian former professional footballer who played as a full-back.

== Honours ==
PSM Makassar

- Liga Indonesia Premier Division: 1999–2000; runner up: 2001

Arema Malang

- Copa Indonesia: 2005, 2006

Indonesia

- AFF Championship third place: 1998
