= Boaz Solossa =

Indonesian footballer (born 1986)

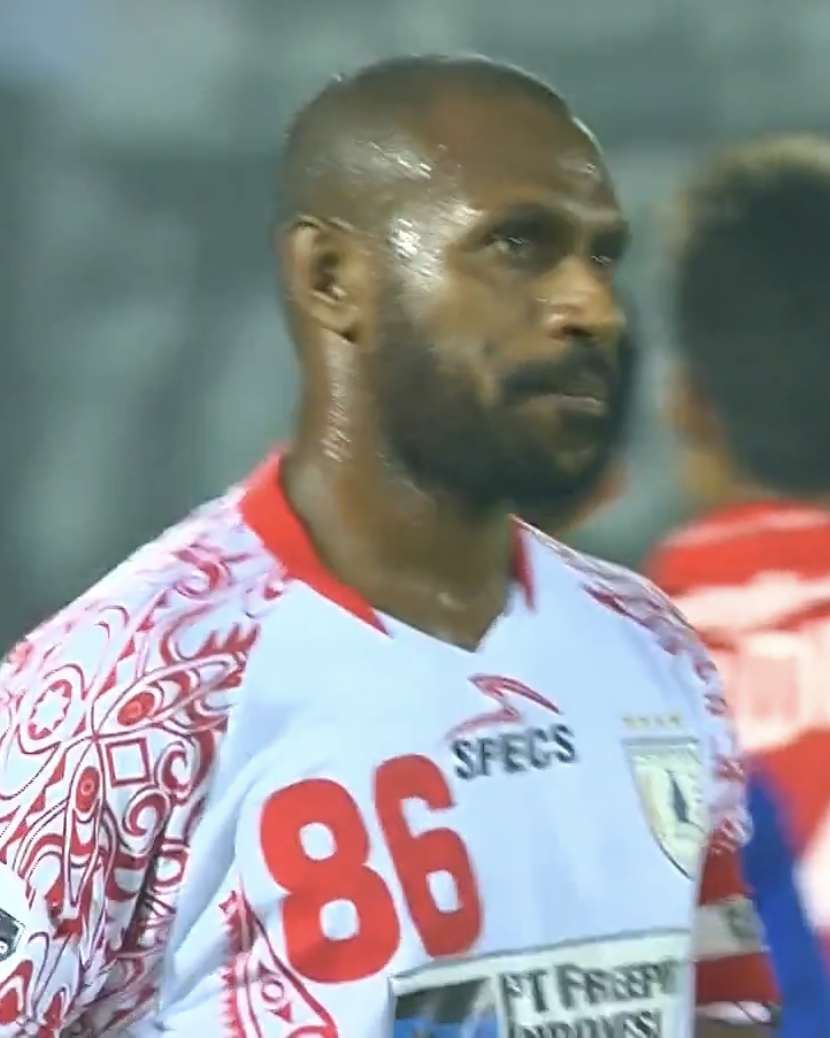
- Boaz playing for Persipura in 2015

Personal information
- Full name: Boaz Theofilus Erwin Solossa
- Date of birth: 16 March 1986 (age 40)
- Place of birth: Sorong, Indonesia
- Height: 1.71 m (5 ft 7 in)
- Position: Forward

Team information
- Current team: Persipura Jayapura
- Number: 86

Youth career
- 1998–1999: Persiss Sorong
- 1999–2000: PS Putra Yohan
- 2000–2001: Perseru Serui
- 2002–2004: Persipura Jayapura

Senior career*
Years	Team	Apps	(Gls)
2004–2021	Persipura Jayapura	305	(182)
2016	→ Carsae (loan)	4	(1)
2021–2022	Borneo	22	(3)
2022–2023	PSS Sleman	10	(0)
2022	→ Persipura Jayapura (loan)	0	(0)
2023–2024	Persewar Waropen	16	(8)
2024–	Persipura Jayapura	41	(8)

International career
2003	Indonesia U17	7	(4)
2004	Indonesia U19	8	(2)
2005–2009	Indonesia U23	4	(1)
2004–2018	Indonesia	50	(13)
Medal record
Men's football
Representing Indonesia
AFF Championship
Runner-up	2004 Vietnam & Malaysia	Team
Runner-up	2016 Myanmar & Philippines	Team
- * Club domestic league appearances and goals as of 26 April 2026

Boaz Theofilus Erwin Solossa (born 16 March 1986) is an Indonesian professional footballer who plays as a forward for Liga 2 club Persipura Jayapura. He is considered to be one of the greatest Indonesian players of all time.

== Club career ==
=== Early career ===
Boaz began his junior career by playing at amateur club PS Putra Yohan in 1999 to 2000. He then spent a year at Perseru Serui from 2000 to 2001.

A 17-year old Boaz was called up to the Papua PON Team to be play in the 16th National Sports Week. His talent was finally recognized by national team coach Peter Withe, who selected him for the 2004 Tiger Cup when he was 18 years old.

=== Persipura Jayapura ===
Boaz signed his first professional contract with Persipura Jayapura in 2005. Since then, he emerged as a highly influential player at the club and even served as captain of the team after the departure of Eduard Ivakdalam. He is seen as a club legend by Persipura fans.

He is Persipura Jayapura's all-time record goalscorer and has helped them to win the top division of Indonesia's professional football league four times in the 2005, 2009, 2011 and 2013 seasons.

Despite having played for other Papua-based clubs, Boaz holds Persipura as his second home as well as his extended family. But when Indonesia's professional football competition was halted due to FIFA sanctions from 2015 to 2016, he accepted an offer from Borneo FC to play in a non-official tournament because Persipura had decided to temporarily disband. At the beginning of the 2018 season, he returned to play for Borneo FC only for the 2018 Presidential Cup pre-season tournament.

In July 2021, Boaz and teammate Yustinus Pae were released by Persipura, due to disciplinary issues. He would return to Persipura in 2024 after stints at other Indonesian-Papuan clubs. Till date, Boaz has made 359 appearances and scored 225 goals in all competitions for Persipura.

=== Carsae ===
In 2016, Boaz was loaned by Persipura for the first time in his career to play for Carsae in East Timor after the conditions of Indonesian football at that time were being vacuumed due to FIFA sanctions, joining fellow Indonesians Imanuel Wanggai and Oktovianus Maniani. However, in April 2016 having only made four appearances Boaz along with Wanggai left the club by mutual consent to rejoin Persipura.

=== Borneo ===
After spending 16 years with Persipura, On 17 July 2021 Boaz joined Borneo on a 2-season deal. On 10 September 2021, Boaz made his debut for Borneo on a league game against Persik Kediri coming on as a substitute in the 70th-minute, as his team lose 1–0. On 8 January 2022, Boaz scored his first goal for Borneo against Persik Kediri at the Kapten I Wayan Dipta Stadium, Gianyar.

== International career ==
I broke my leg twice while playing for Indonesia, not Persipura

— Boaz after labeled of not being nationalistic

The first time he appeared was dubbed the "prodigy", when he was brought by Peter Withe and performed a stunning performance in Ho Chi Minh City, when he performed with the Indonesian National Team in the 2004 Tiger Cup. Boaz's international debut was against Turkmenistan on 30 March 2004 for the 2006 World Cup qualification where Indonesia won 3–1 and Boaz made two assists for his teammate Ilham Jaya Kesuma. Boaz was considered to be a bright prospect in Indonesian football after performing brilliantly in the 2004 Tiger Cup, where Indonesia was defeated by Singapore in a home and away match, which resulted in an aggregate score of 5–2 to Singapore. In the group phase, Boaz managed to score 4 goals and along with Ilham Jayakesuma, who scored 7 goals, both led the top scorers chart.

He was injured after a tough tackle in a friendly match against Hong Kong, forcing him to miss the Asian Cup 2007 and disappear from football for 10 months.

After another failure for the Indonesian national team to become a champion in the 2016 AFF Championship, Boaz announce his retirement from the national squad to give chance to other young players as well admitting he was "tired to see Indonesia without any trophy in the tournament". He congratulate Thailand for their fifth trophy and acknowledged that "Thai players and their performances are much better and still far from us to reach". However, Boaz still disclosed his intention to retire, saying he wanted to discuss the matter with his family first while celebrating Christmas in his hometown of Sorong.

== Personal life ==
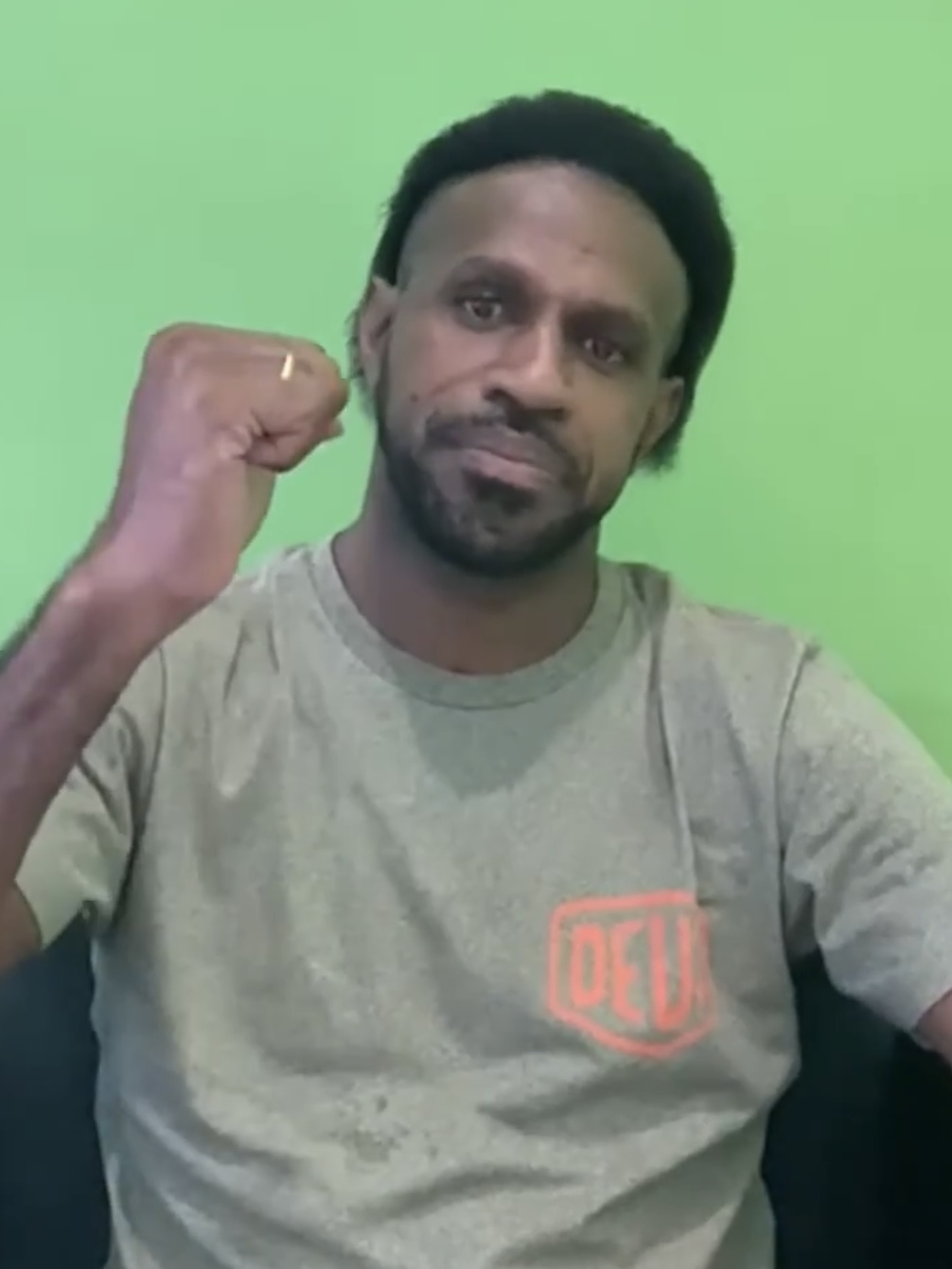
Boaz Solossa in August 2021

Boaz was born into a well-known family in Western New Guinea. His uncle, Jaap Solossa, was the governor of the greater Papua province before he died in 2005. Football also runs in the blood of the Solossa clan as well, with Boaz being the youngest of five children who all went on to become professionals, like his brothers Ortizan and Nehemia. Boaz obtained a Bachelor of Economics at Cenderawasih University in 2013. He also works as civil servant.

== Career statistics ==
=== Club ===
As of 26 April 2026

Club	Season	League			Cup (Note: Appearances in Piala Indonesia.)		Other		Continental (Note: Appearances in AFC Cup.) (Note: Appearances in AFC Champions League.)		Total	
Club	Season	Division	Apps	Goals	Apps	Goals	Apps	Goals	Apps	Goals	Apps	Goals
Persipura Jayapura	2005	LIPD	16	7	2	2	–		–		18	9
Persipura Jayapura	2006	LIPD	12	10	2	3	–		–		14	13
Persipura Jayapura	2007–08	LIPD	19	13	4	5	–		–		23	18
Persipura Jayapura	2008–09	ISL	31	28	7	7	–		–		38	35
Persipura Jayapura	2009–10	ISL	28	17	9	8	1	2	5	0	43	27
Persipura Jayapura	2010–11	ISL	27	21	–		–		8	5	35	26
Persipura Jayapura	2011–12	ISL	13	7	–		–		–		13	7
Persipura Jayapura	2013	ISL	32	25	–		–		–		32	25
Persipura Jayapura	2014	ISL	21	11	–		–		10	6	31	17
Persipura Jayapura	2015	ISL	1	1	–		–		6	5	7	6
Persipura Jayapura	2016	ISC A	22	11	–		–		–		22	11
Persipura Jayapura	2017	Liga 1	27	10	–		–		–		27	10
Persipura Jayapura	2018	Liga 1	27	11	–		–		–		27	11
Persipura Jayapura	2019	Liga 1	26	9	0	0	–		–		26	9
Persipura Jayapura	2020	Liga 1	3	1	0	0	–		–		3	1
Persipura Jayapura	2021–22	Liga 1	0	0	0	0	–		0	0	0	0
Persipura Jayapura	Total		305	182	24	25	1	2	29	16	359	225
Carsae (loan)	2016	LFA	4	1	–		–		–		4	1
Borneo	2021–22	Liga 1	22	3	–		–		–		22	3
PSS Sleman	2022–23	Liga 1	10	0	0	0	–		0	0	10	0
Persipura Jayapura (loan)	2022–23	Liga 2	0	0	0	0	–		0	0	0	0
Persewar Waropen	2023–24	Liga 2	16	8	0	0	–		0	0	16	8
Persipura Jayapura	2024–25	Liga 2	20	6	0	0	–		0	0	20	6
Persipura Jayapura	2025–26	Liga 2	21	2	0	0	–		0	0	21	1
Career total			398	202	24	25	1	2	29	16	452	245

=== International ===
Appearances and goals by national team and year
National team	Year	Apps	Goals
Indonesia	2004	6	2
Indonesia	2005	2	1
Indonesia	2006	4	0
Indonesia	2007	1	0
Indonesia	2008	0	0
Indonesia	2009	3	0
Indonesia	2010	3	2
Indonesia	2011	4	0
Indonesia	2012	0	0
Indonesia	2013	7	2
Indonesia	2014	4	0
Indonesia	2015	2	0
Indonesia	2016	11	6
Indonesia	2017	2	0
Indonesia	2018	3	0
Total		50	13

As of match played 11 September 2018
Scores and results list Indonesia's goal tally first, score column indicates score after each Solossa goal.

List of international goals scored by Boaz Solossa
No.	Date	Venue	Cap	Opponent	Score	Result	Competition
1	9 December 2004	Thong Nhat Stadium, Ho Chi Minh City, Vietnam	3	Laos	1–0	6–0	2004 Tiger Cup
2	11 December 2004	Mỹ Đình National Stadium, Hanoi, Vietnam	5	Vietnam	2–0	3–0	2004 Tiger Cup
3	3 January 2005	Bukit Jalil Stadium, Kuala Lumpur, Malaysia	7	Malaysia	4–1	4–1	2004 Tiger Cup
4	6 January 2010	Gelora Bung Karno Stadium, Jakarta, Indonesia	17	Oman	1–1	1–2	2011 AFC Asian Cup qualification
5	8 October 2010	Gelora Bung Karno Stadium, Jakarta, Indonesia	18	Uruguay	1–0	1–7	Friendly
6	23 March 2013	Gelora Bung Karno Stadium, Jakarta, Indonesia	24	Saudi Arabia	1–0	1–2	2015 AFC Asian Cup qualification
7	15 October 2013	Gelora Bung Karno Stadium, Jakarta, Indonesia	27	China	1–1	1–1	2015 AFC Asian Cup qualification
8	6 September 2016	Manahan Stadium, Surakarta, Indonesia	37	Malaysia	1–0	3–0	Friendly
9	6 September 2016	Manahan Stadium, Surakarta, Indonesia	37	Malaysia	3–0	3–0	Friendly
10	8 November 2016	Mỹ Đình National Stadium, Hanoi, Vietnam	40	Vietnam	1–0	2–3	Friendly
11	19 November 2016	Philippine Sports Stadium, Bocaue, Philippines	41	Thailand	1–2	2–4	2016 AFF Championship
12	21 November 2016	Philippine Sports Stadium, Bocaue, Philippines	42	Philippines	2–1	2–2	2016 AFF Championship
13	3 December 2016	Pakansari Stadium, Bogor, Indonesia	44	Vietnam	2–1	2–1	2016 AFF Championship

== Honours ==
Persipura Jayapura

- (Liga Indonesia Premier Division/Indonesia Super League/Indonesia Soccer Championship A) Domestic League Top Tier Division (5): 2005, 2008–09, 2010–11, 2013, 2016
- Indonesian Community Shield: 2009
- Indonesian Inter Island Cup: 2011

Indonesia

- Indonesian Independence Cup: 2008
- AFF Championship runner-up: 2004, 2016

Individual

- (Indonesia Super League) Domestic League Top Tier Division Top Scorer (3): 2008–09, 2010–11, 2013
- (Indonesia Super League/Indonesia Soccer Championship A) Domestic League Top Tier Division Best Player (4): 2008–09, 2010–11, 2013, 2016
- (Indonesia Soccer Championship A) Domestic League Top Tier Division Best XI: 2016
- AFF Championship Best XI : 2016
- ASEAN Football Federation Best XI: 2017
- Favourite Athlete : Anugerah Olahraga Indonesia (AORI) XXIX: 2017
- AFC Cup Best XI: (2021)

Record

- First Indonesian in list of FourFourTwo 50 Best Asian Football Player (2017)

Preceded by Firman Utina	Indonesian Captain; 2014–2018	Succeeded by Hansamu Yama
