= Franco Hita =

Argentine footballer (born 1978)

Personal information
- Full name: Franco Martin Hita González
- Date of birth: 26 October 1978 (age 48)
- Place of birth: Mendoza, Argentina
- Height: 1.80 m (5 ft 11 in)
- Position: Striker

Youth career
- Gimnasia de Mendoza
- Unión La Calera

Senior career*
Years	Team	Apps	(Gls)
1998	San Luis	–	(–)
1999–2001	Santiago Wanderers	5	(0)
2002	Provincial Osorno		(1)
2003	Unión La Calera		
2003	Gimnasia de Mendoza	4	(0)
2004	Persigo Gorontalo		
2004	Persiter Ternate		
2005	Persita Tangerang		
2005–2006	Arema Malang	46	(22)
2007	Persema Malang	44	(24)
2007	Santiago Morning	12	(0)
2008	Unión San Felipe	39	(0)
2008–2009	Mitra Kukar	18	(7)
2009–2010	Persela Lamongan	16	(8)
2010–2011	Mitra Kukar	38	(21)
2011–2012	Chiangrai United	22	(10)
2013	Gutiérrez	4	(0)
2014	General Paz Juniors	10	(0)
2015	Sportivo Peñarol	7	(2)
- * Club domestic league appearances and goals

Franco Martin Hita González (born 26 October 1978) is an Argentine naturalized Chilean former footballer who played as a striker.

== Personal life ==
Hita is the son of the former Argentine footballer Alberto Hita and naturalized Chilean.

== Honours ==
Santiago Wanderers

- Primera División de Chile (1): 2001

Arema Malang

- Copa Indonesia (1): 2005
