= Hendro Kartiko =

Indonesian footballer

Personal information
- Full name: Hendro Kartiko
- Date of birth: 24 April 1973 (age 53)
- Place of birth: Banyuwangi, Indonesia
- Height: 1.75 m (5 ft 9 in)
- Position: Goalkeeper

Youth career
- 1989: Porsela Treblasala
- 1989: Glemore Banyuwangi
- 1990–1991: Persewangi Banyuwangi
- 1992–1994: PS Unmuh Jember

Senior career*
Years	Team	Apps	(Gls)
1994–1995	Persid Jember	16	(0)
1995–1997	Mitra Surabaya	32	(0)
1997–1999	Persebaya Surabaya	28	(0)
1999–2001	PSM Makassar	32	(0)
2002–2003	PSPS Pekanbaru	23	(0)
2003–2004	Persebaya Surabaya	26	(0)
2005–2006	Persija Jakarta	28	(0)
2006–2008	Arema Malang	30	(0)
2008–2009	Persija Jakarta	33	(0)
2009–2010	Sriwijaya	24	(0)
2010–2011	Persija Jakarta	28	(0)
2011–2012	Mitra Kukar	15	(0)
Total		315	(0)

International career
1996–2011	Indonesia	60	(0)

Managerial career
- 2012–2016: Arema (goalkeeper coach)
- 2016–2018: Sriwijaya (goalkeeper coach)
- 2018–2019: Madura United (goalkeeper coach)
- 2019: Indonesia U-23 (goalkeeper coach)
- 2020–2021: PSM Makassar (goalkeeper coach)
- 2021–2022: Madura United (goalkeeper coach)
- 2022–2024: Bhayangkara (goalkeeper coach)
- 2024–2025: Persija Jakarta (goalkeeper coach)
Medal record
Men's football
Representing Indonesia
AFF Championship
Third place	1998 Thailand
Runner-up	2000 Thailand
Runner-up	2002 Indonesia & Singapore
Runner-up	2004 Malaysia & Vietnam
Southeast Asian Games
Bronze medal – third place	1999 Brunei	Team
Indonesia Independence Cup
Winner	2000 Indonesia
- * Club domestic league appearances and goals

Hendro Kartiko (born 24 April 1973 in Banyuwangi, East Java) is an Indonesian former footballer who last played with Mitra Kukar. He normally played as a goalkeeper. He also played for the Indonesia national football team.

== International career ==
His debut appearance in the national team was in the Asian Cup 1996 for Indonesia against Kuwait, where Indonesia drew 2-2. He came on as a substitute for the injured Kurnia Sandy in the 80th minute. In Asian Cup 2000, he was nicknamed "Fabien Barthez of Asia" by fans, though Indonesia only managed one draw and two losses in the first round. They drew 0-0 with Kuwait, lost 0-4 to China PR, and lost 0-3 to South Korea.

In Asian Cup 2004, he was chosen as 'Man of the Match' for Indonesia against Qatar, which Indonesia won 2-1. He has 60 caps in the national team since his debut in 1996 and became one of football players in his country with the most appearances in the national team. Since 2007, he has not been chosen again as the number one goalkeeper in the national team, in 2011 he was called back for the national team to play in 2014 world cup qualifiers playing his two last matches, where Indonesia lost 4-0 to Qatar and 4-1 to Iran

Kartiko played for Arema Malang in the 2007 AFC Champions League group stage. Now, he is a goalkeeper coach on Persija Jakarta.

== Honours ==
PSM Makassar

- Liga Indonesia Premier Division: 1999–2000; runner up: 2001

Persebaya Surabaya

- Liga Indonesia Premier Division: 2004; runner up: 1998–99

Persija Jakarta

- Liga Indonesia Premier Division runner up: 2005
- Copa Indonesia runner-up: 2005

Sriwijaya

- Piala Indonesia: 2010

Indonesia

- SEA Games bronze medal: 1999
- Indonesian Independence Cup: 2000
- AFF Championship runner-up: 2000, 2002, 2004; third place: 1998

Individual

- AFC Asian All Stars XI: 2000
