= Francis Wewengkang =

Indonesian footballer

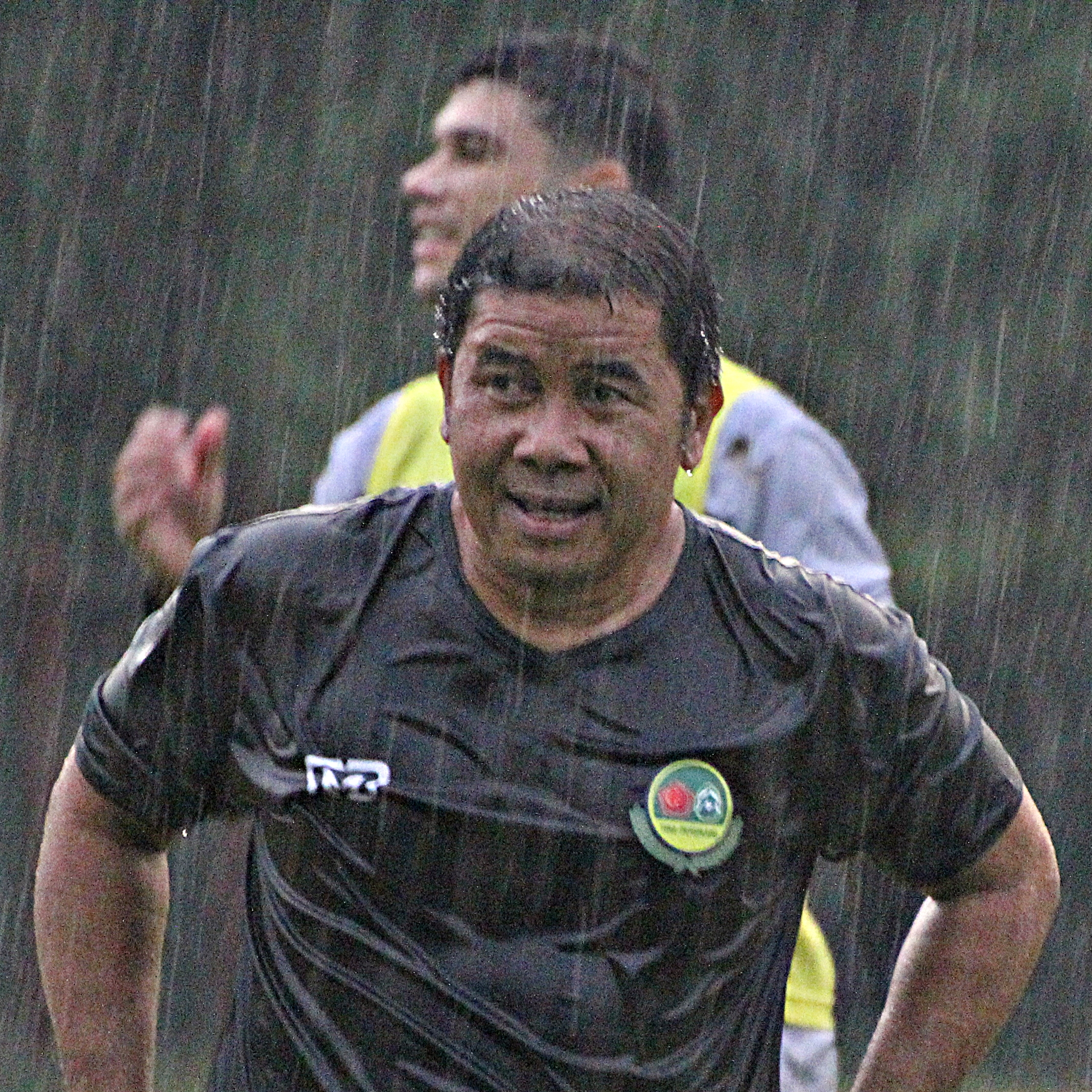

Personal information
- Full name: Francis Reynald Wewengkang
- Date of birth: 10 January 1971 (age 55)
- Place of birth: Manado, North Sulawesi, Indonesia
- Height: 1.71 m (5 ft 7 1/2 in)
- Position: Midfielder

Team information
- Current team: Persita Tangerang (assistant coach)

Senior career*
Years	Team	Apps	(Gls)
- Persma Manado
2001	Persijatim		
- Persikota Tangerang
2005–2007	Persija Jakarta		
2008–2009	Persibom Bolaang Mongondow		
2009–2010	Pro Titan		

International career
1996–1997	Indonesia	6	(0)

Managerial career
- 2019: TIRA-Persikabo (assistant)
- 2020–: Persita Tangerang (assistant)
- 2023–: RANS Nusantara (assistant)
- * Club domestic league appearances and goals

Francis Reynald Wewengkang (born 10 January 1971 in Manado) usually called Francis Wewengkang or Enal, is an Indonesian former footballer who played for the Indonesia national team. He last played for Pro Titan. Nowadays he is an assistant coach at Persita Tangerang.

== Honours ==
Persija Jakarta

- Liga Indonesia Premier Division runner up: 2005
- Copa Indonesia runner-up: 2005
