= Ardi Warsidi =

Indonesian footballer

Personal information
- Full name: Ardi Warsidi
- Date of birth: 22 August 1979 (age 47)
- Place of birth: Jepara, Indonesia
- Height: 1.80 m (5 ft 11 in)
- Position: Defender

Youth career
- 1994–1996: Persijap Jepara
- 1997–1999: Diklat Ragunan

Senior career*
Years	Team	Apps	(Gls)
1999	Persita Tangerang	27	(0)
1999–2004	Persija Jakarta	52	(1)
2004–2006	Arema Malang		
2006–2009	Persmin Minahasa		
2009–2010	PSS Sleman		

International career
1999–2004	Indonesia	21	(0)
- * Club domestic league appearances and goals

Ardi Warsidi (born 22 August 1979) is an Indonesian former footballer who plays as a defender.

== Honours ==
Persija Jakarta

- Liga Indonesia Premier Division: 2001

Arema Malang

- Liga Indonesia First Division: 2004
- Copa Indonesia: 2005, 2006

Indonesia

- AFF Championship runner-up: 2000
