= Firman Utina =

Indonesian footballer

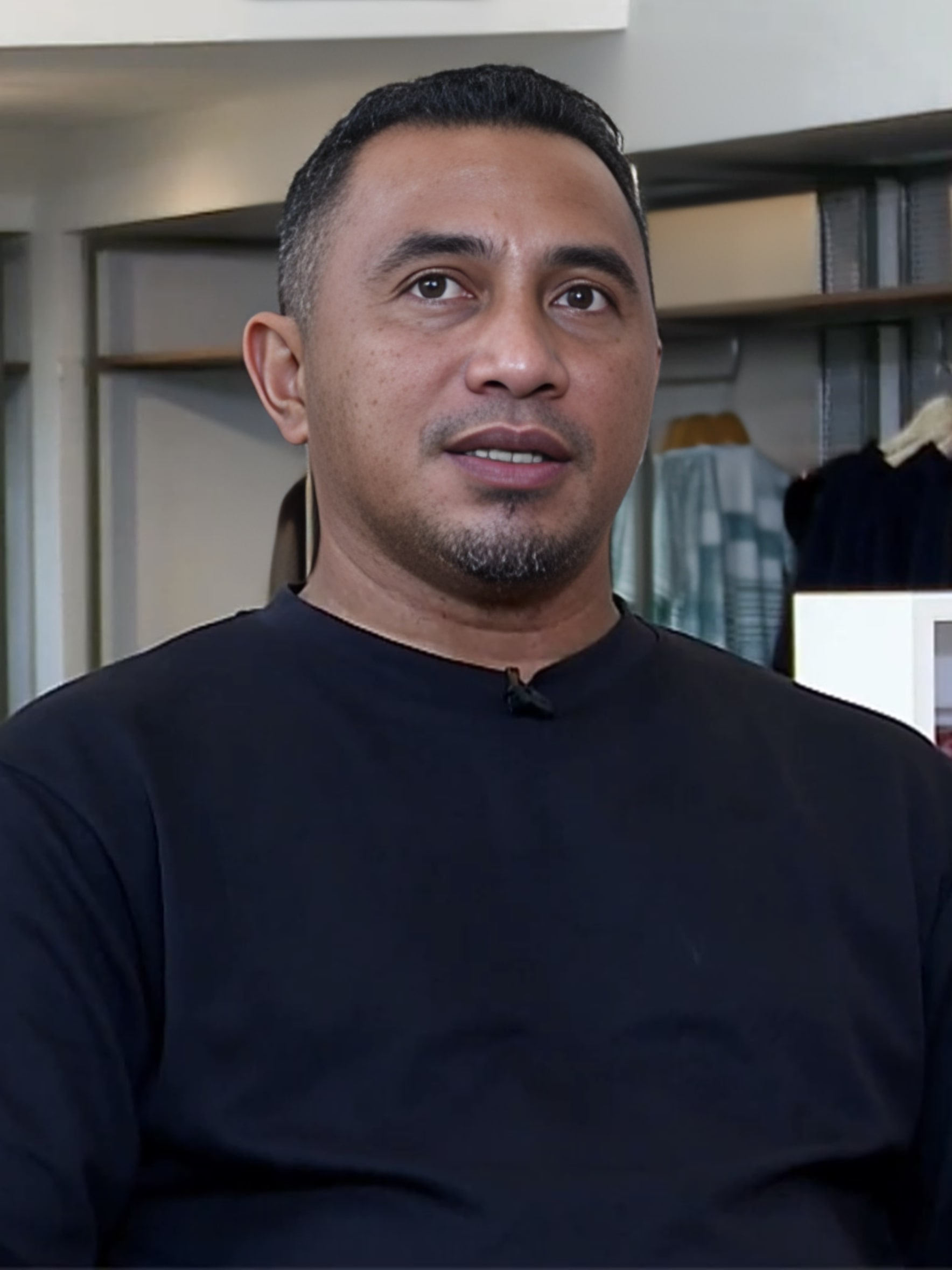
- Firman in May 2024

Personal information
- Full name: Firman Utina
- Date of birth: 15 December 1981 (age 44)
- Place of birth: Manado, Indonesia
- Height: 1.66 m (5 ft 5 in)
- Position: Midfielder

Team information
- Current team: Dewa United (assistant coach)

Youth career
- 1993−1994: Indonesia Muda Manado
- 1995−1998: Bina Taruna Manado
- 1998−1999: Persma Manado

Senior career*
Years	Team	Apps	(Gls)
2000–2001	Persma Manado	14	(0)
2001−2004	Persita Tangerang	65	(8)
2004−2006	Arema Malang	38	(4)
2006−2008	Persita Tangerang	29	(0)
2008−2010	Pelita Jaya	40	(3)
2010−2011	Persija Jakarta	15	(3)
2011−2013	Sriwijaya	42	(6)
2013−2015	Persib Bandung	55	(4)
2016–2017	Sriwijaya	24	(0)
2017–2018	Bhayangkara	15	(0)
2018	Kalteng Putra	18	(1)
Total		355	(29)

International career
1998	Indonesia U19		
2001−2003	Indonesia U23		
2001−2014	Indonesia	66	(5)

Managerial career
- 2018: Bhayangkara (assistant coach)
- 2024−: Dewa United (assistant coach)
Medal record
Indonesia
Asean Football Championship
Runner-up	2004 Tiger Cup	2004
Runner-up	AFF Suzuki Cup 2010	2010
Indonesia Independence Cup
Winner	2008 Indonesia
- * Club domestic league appearances and goals

Firman Utina (born 15 December 1981) is an Indonesian professional football coach and former player who is currently assistant coach at Liga 1 club Dewa United. An attacking midfielder, Firman played for several clubs in Indonesia throughout his career, most notably winning league titles with Sriwijaya, Persib Bandung, and Bhayangkara.

At national level, Firman played for Indonesia in the under-19 and under-23 level, prior to his senior team debut in a 2002 FIFA World Cup qualification match against Cambodia in 2001. After his debut, he became regular call-up to the national side for 13 years, participating in four editions of the AFF Championship as well as the 2007 AFC Asian Cup. In the latter tournament, he arguably put his best performance when he was chosen as man of the match for Indonesia against Bahrain in a group stage match, which Indonesia won 2–1 due to his contribution for Indonesia's goals. He captained Indonesia at the 2010 AFF Championship and was crowned the tournament's most valuable player.

== Personal life ==
Firman Utina is Muslim who observes the Islamic month of Ramadan.

== Career statistics ==
=== National team ===
Indonesia national team
Year	Apps	Goals
2001	1	0
2004	5	0
2005	4	0
2007	7	0
2008	12	2
2009	4	0
2010	12	3
2011	10	0
2014	11	0
Total	66	5

=== International goals ===
Goal	Date	Venue	Opponent	Score	Result	Competition
1	13 November 2008	Thuwunna Stadium, Yangon, Myanmar	Bangladesh	1–0	2–0	2008 Myanmar Grand Royal Challenge Cup
2	5 December 2008	Gelora Bung Karno Stadium, Jakarta, Indonesia	Myanmar	2–0	3–0	2008 AFF Championship
3	24 November 2010	Gelora Sriwijaya Stadium, Palembang, Indonesia	Chinese Taipei	2–0	2–0	Friendly
4	4 December 2010	Gelora Bung Karno Stadium, Jakarta, Indonesia	Laos	1–0	6–0	2010 AFF Championship
5	4 December 2010	Gelora Bung Karno Stadium, Jakarta, Indonesia	Laos	3–0	6–0	2010 AFF Championship
Correct as of 13 January 2017

== Honours ==
Persita Tangerang

- Liga Indonesia Premier Division runner up: 2002

Arema Malang

- Copa Indonesia: 2005, 2006

Sriwijaya

- Indonesia Super League: 2011–12
- Indonesian Community Shield: 2010

Persib Bandung

- Indonesia Super League: 2014
- Piala Presiden: 2015

Bhayangkara

- Liga 1: 2017

Indonesia

- Indonesian Independence Cup: 2008
- AFF Championship runner-up: 2004, 2010

Individual

- Copa Indonesia Best Player: 2005
- AFF Championship Most Valuable Player: 2010

Preceded by Elie Aiboy	Indonesian Captain; 2013–2014	Succeeded by Boaz Solossa
