= Agus Indra Kurniawan =

Indonesian footballer

Personal information
- Full name: Agus Indra Kurniawan
- Date of birth: 27 February 1982 (age 44)
- Place of birth: Gresik, Indonesia
- Height: 1.75 m (5 ft 9 in)
- Position: Midfielder

Team information
- Current team: Adhyaksa F.C. (assistant coach)

Senior career*
Years	Team	Apps	(Gls)
2000–2004	Petrokimia Putra	72	(8)
2004–2011	Persija Jakarta	168	(26)
2011–2013	Gresik United	48	(3)
2014–2015	Pelita Bandung Raya	17	(3)
2016–2017	Gresik United	40	(3)
2019–2021	Muba Babel United	8	(0)
Total		353	(43)

International career
2002–2003	Indonesia U21		
2003–2005	Indonesia U23		
2004–2007	Indonesia	10	(0)

Managerial career
- 2021: Muba Babel United (Assistant)
- 2022−2023: Gresik United (Assistant)
- 2023−2024: Gresik United (Head Coach)
Medal record
Men's football
Representing Indonesia
AFF Championship
Runner-up	2004 Vietnam & Malaysia	Team
- * Club domestic league appearances and goals

Agus Indra Kurniawan (born 27 February 1982) is an Indonesian former professional footballer who last played as a midfielder for Liga 2 club Muba Babel United.

== Club career ==
On 31 December 2013, he was signed by Pelita Bandung Raya.

== Honours ==
Petrokimia Putra

- Liga Indonesia Premier Division: 2002

Persija Jakarta

- Liga Indonesia Premier Division runner up: 2005

Indonesia U-21

- Hassanal Bolkiah Trophy: 2002

Indonesia

- AFF Championship runner-up: 2004
