= Benny Dollo =

Indonesian football coach (1950–2023)

Personal information
- Full name: Benny Selvianus Dollo
- Date of birth: 22 September 1950
- Place of birth: Manado, Sulawesi, Indonesia
- Date of death: 1 February 2023 (aged 72)
- Place of death: South Tangerang, Banten, Indonesia

Managerial career
- Years: Team
- 1983: UMS 80
- 1985: UMS Amatir
- 1987–1994: Pelita Jaya Jawa Barat
- 1995–1998: Persita Tangerang
- 1999: Persitara Jakarta Utara
- 2000: Persma Manado
- 2000–2001: Indonesia
- 2000–2001: Indonesia U23
- 2001–2003: Persita Tangerang
- 2004–2006: Arema Malang
- 2007–2008: Persita Tangerang
- 2008–2010: Indonesia
- 2009–2010: Persija Jakarta
- 2010–2011: Mitra Kukar
- 2013–2014: Persija Jakarta
- 2014–2016: Sriwijaya
- 2015: Indonesia (caretaker)

Benny Selvianus Dollo (22 September 1950 – 1 February 2023) was an Indonesian football coach.

Dollo coached Indonesia national team in two periods, with less success compared to his predecessor or successor.

From 2004 until 2006, he trained Arema Malang in Liga Indonesia Premier Division. During his time with Arema, he has brought the club to win the First Division and Copa Dji Sam Soe (2005, 2006). Previously he has also coached Persita Tangerang to second place in the league in 2002 season.

Dollo died on 1 February 2023, at the age of 72.

== Honours ==
Pelita Jaya Jawa Barat

- Galatama: 1988–89, 1990, 1993–94
- Piala Utama: 1992

Arema Malang

- Liga Indonesia First Division: 2004
- Copa Indonesia: 2005, 2006

Indonesia

- Indonesia Independence Cup: 2008
