= Leonardo Gutiérrez (footballer) =

Chilean footballer (born 1974)

Personal information
- Full name: Leonardo Antonio Gutiérrez Fantuzzi
- Date of birth: 24 September 1974 (age 52)
- Place of birth: Chile
- Position: Defender

Senior career*
Years	Team	Apps	(Gls)
1995	Deportes Antofagasta	1	(0)
1997–2000	Deportes Concepción	19	(0)
2002–2005	Persebaya Surabaya		
2006	Persik Kediri		(3)
2007–2008	Persma Manado		
2008	Persebaya Surabaya		
2009	Deportes Copiapó	17	(0)
- * Club domestic league appearances and goals

Leonardo Antonio Gutiérrez Fantuzzi (born 24 September 1974) is a Chilean former professional footballer who played as a defender for clubs in Chile and Indonesia.

== Career ==
In Chile, Gutiérrez played for Deportes Antofagasta and Deportes Concepción in the top division.

At the end of 2002, he went to Indonesia and joined Persebaya Surabaya, staying with them until 2005. He also played for Persik Kediri and Persma Manado.

He won the league titles in both 2003 (Divisi Satu, second division) and 2004 (Premier Division) with Persebaya Surabaya.

In 2009, he joined Deportes Copiapó, his last club, in the Primera B de Chile.

== Honours ==
Persebaya Surabaya

- Divisi Satu: 2003
- Liga Indonesia Premier Division: 2004
