= Serge Emaleu Ngomgoue =

Cameroonian footballer

Serge Emaleu
Personal information
- Full name: Serge Emaleu Ngomgoue
- Date of birth: 21 February 1985 (age 41)
- Place of birth: Bafoussam, West Region, Cameroon
- Height: 1.80 m (5 ft 11 in)
- Position: Forward

Senior career*
Years	Team	Apps	(Gls)
2005–2009	Arema Malang	56	(25)
2009–2010	Pro Duta FC	16	(3)
2010–2011	Persija Jakarta	13	(4)
2011–2012	Persela Lamongan	19	(5)
2012–2013	Persipasi Bekasi	15	(3)
2013	Bontang FC	20	(5)
2014–2015	Persibangga Purbalingga	11	(6)
- * Club domestic league appearances and goals

Serge Emaleu Ngomgoue or Emaleu Serge (born 21 February 1985 in Bafoussam, West Region) is a Cameroonian footballer who last played for Persibangga Purbalingga.

== Career in Indonesia ==
He debuted in Liga Indonesia in the 2005 season along with Arema Malang. He played 46 matches and scored 25 goals. He also managed to bring Arema Malang title at the event Piala Indonesia. He had been a top score of Piala Indonesia 2006 with a score 9 goals.

He had suffered a broken shin injury when dealing with Persipura Jayapura in Makassar Cup, ahead of the competition in 2007 Liga Indonesia Premier Division begin. The injury caused by tackling was hard from his compatriots of Cameroon Bio Paulin, it caused him to be absent for one year.

In the event 2008–09 Indonesia Super League he was recommended to strengthen Arema Malang back again by coach Bambang Nurdiansyah. In the second half of the season he was forced at the streak of Arema Malang team, because he was injured again.

He played for the club Persija Jakarta, he officially joined the Persija Jakarta from March 2010 on the second round of 2009–10 Indonesia Super League season. He transferred to Persija Jakarta from Liga Indonesia Premier Division participants are Pro Duta FC Yogyakarta.

Then he played for club Persela Lamongan, he had played 9 matches without scored any goal. Performance when he play had not reached the best as five years ago when it first played in Indonesia. It made fans of Persela Lamongan doubting him.

Currently he plays for club Persipasi Bekasi on the second round of 2010–11 Liga Indonesia Premier Division. He made 3 goals in 12 matches until the end of season.

== Honours ==
Arema Malang

- Copa Indonesia: 2005, 2006

Individual

- Copa Indonesia Top Goalscorer: 2006
