= Gelora Delta Stadium =

Stadium in Sidoarjo, East Java, Indonesia

Gelora Delta Sidoarjo
- Gelora Delta Sidoarjo
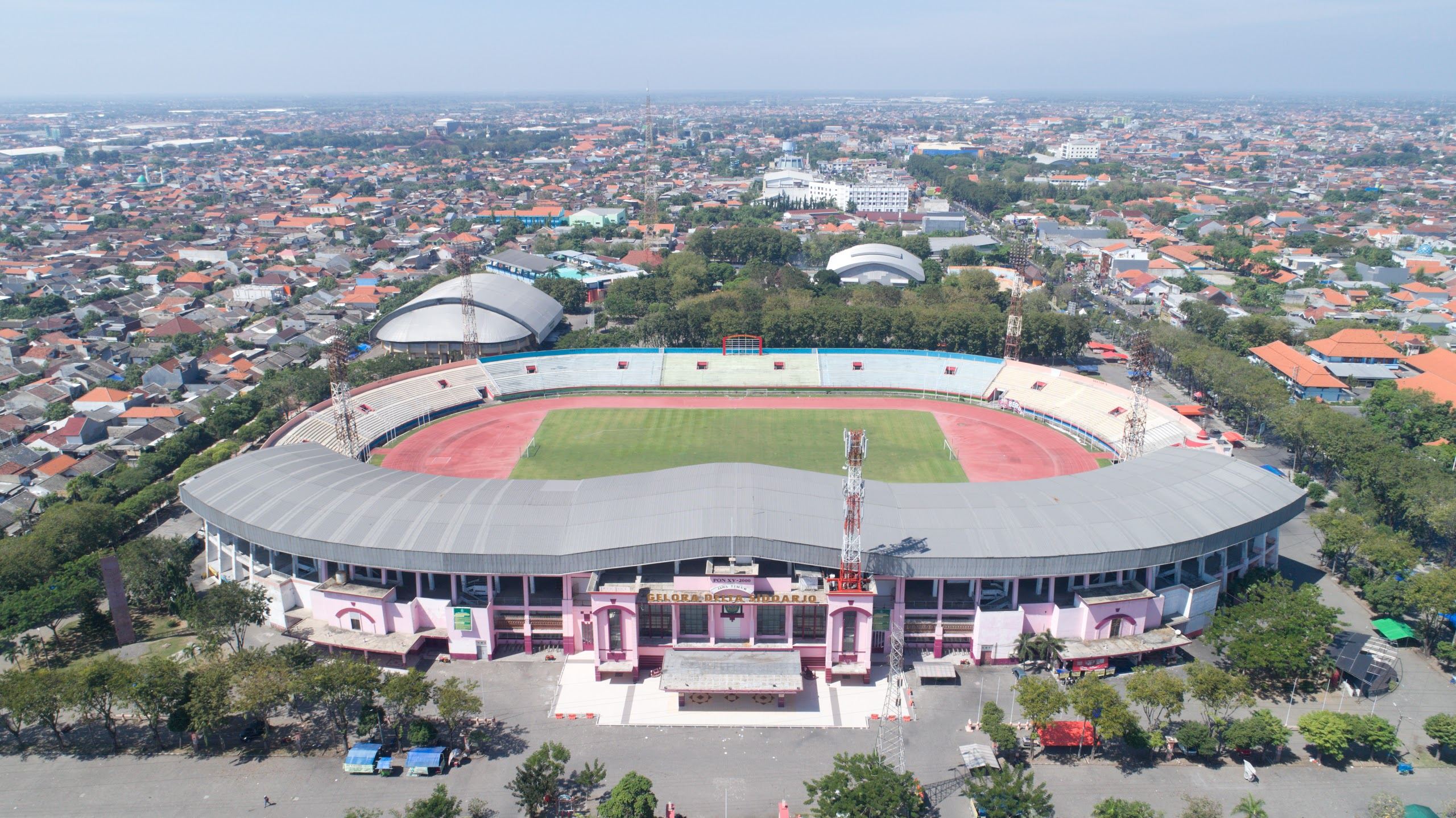

- Location in, East Java and Indonesia Gelora Delta Sidoarjo (Indonesia)
- Location: Sidoarjo, East Java
- Coordinates: 7°26′52″S 112°42′21″E
- Owner: Regency Government of Sidoarjo
- Operator: Regency Government of Sidoarjo
- Capacity: 19,400 Capacity history: 35,000 (2000–2024) 19,400 (2024–present)
- Surface: Grass

Construction
- Opened: 2000

Tenants
- Deltras; Persida Sidoarjo; PS Hizbul Wathan; Putra Delta Sidoarjo

Gelora Delta Sidoarjo is a multi-purpose stadium in the regency of Sidoarjo, East Java, Indonesia. The stadium is located within Greater Surabaya metropolitan area. It is currently mostly used for football matches. The stadium has a capacity of 19,000 people. The stadium was built for organizing the PON XV (15th Indonesian National Sports Week) 2000, which was hosted by East Java and after the event East Java PON museum was built in front of the stadium.

The stadium is used as a venue for Indonesian National Football League. It is the home base of Deltras Sidoarjo, Persida Sidoarjo and PS Hizbul Wathan.

== Sport events ==
- 2000 Pekan Olahraga Nasional
- 2006 Piala Indonesia Final.
- 2007 Piala Indonesia Opening match.
- 2007 Liga Indonesia Premier Division Quarterfinals.
- 2013 AFF U-19 Youth Championship
- 2014 Liga Indonesia Premier Division Semifinals and final.
- 2018 AFF U-18 Youth Championship
- 2018 AFF U-16 Youth Championship
- 2026 ASEAN U-17 Boys' Championship

== International matches hosted ==
Date	Competition	Team	Res	Team
21 Jun 2014	International Friendly	Indonesia	4–0	Pakistan
14 Sep 2014	International Friendly	Indonesia	2–0	Malaysia
25 Sep 2014	International Friendly	Indonesia	1–0	Cambodia
25 Mar 2015	International Friendly	Indonesia	0–1	Cameroon
30 Mar 2015	International Friendly	Indonesia	2–1	Myanmar
