= Roger Batoum =

Cameroonian footballer

Personal information
- Full name: Urbain Roger Batoum
- Date of birth: 19 December 1978 (age 47)
- Place of birth: Yaoundé, Cameroon
- Height: 1.81 m (5 ft 11 in)
- Position: Striker

Senior career*
Years	Team	Apps	(Gls)
1995–1996	Jonnerre		
1996–1998	Prévoyance Yaoundé		
1998–1999	Unisport de Bafang		
1999–2000	US Bitam		
2000–2002	Tonnerre Yaoundé		
2002–2003	Villa Española		
2004	Unirea Urziceni	7	(6)
2005	Persija Jakarta	25	(20)
2006	Happy Valley	0	(0)
2007	Kui Tan		(6)
2007–2008	Persikabo Bogor	26	(15)
2008–2009	Sun Hei		
2009–2010	Persiraja Banda Aceh		
2010–2011	Convoy Sun Hei	8	(3)
2011–2012	Persebaya	20	(5)
2012–2013	PSCS Cilacap	22	(8)
- * Club domestic league appearances and goals

Urbain Roger Batoum (Chinese: 羅渣 Roger; born 19 December 1978 in Cameroon) is a Cameroonian footballer.

== Honours ==
Happy Valley

- Hong Kong Senior Shield: 2003–04
- Hong Kong FA Cup: 2003–04

Persija Jakarta

- Liga Indonesia Premier Division runner up: 2005
- Copa Indonesia runner-up: 2005
