= 2005 Liga Indonesia Premier Division =

Liga Indonesia Premier Division
- Season: 2005
- Dates: 5 March – 25 September
- Champions: Persipura; 1st Premier Division title 1st Indonesian title
- Relegated: Persebaya; PSPS; Pelita Krakatau Steel; Petrokimia Putra
- AFC Champions League: Persipura; Arema
- Matches: 378
- Goals: 887 (2.35 per match)
- Top goalscorer: Cristian Gonzáles (25 goals)
- Biggest home win: Persik 5–0 Persema (13 July); Persijap 5–0 Persiba (31 August); Arema 5–0 Persikota (4 September)
- Biggest away win: Sriwijaya 1–4 Persib (8 March); Pelita Krakatau Steel 0–3 Persema (20 April)
- Highest scoring: Persebaya 5–1 Petrokimia Putra (5 March); Arema 5–1 PSDS (20 March); PSM 4–2 Pelita Krakatau Steel (10 April); Persib 3–3 Persikota (5 July); PSDS 2–4 Sriwijaya (27 July); Persija 4–2 Persekabpas (27 July); PSPS 4–2 Persib (3 August); Persikota 3–3 PSDS (19 August)

The 2005 Liga Indonesia Premier Division (also known as the Liga Djarum Indonesia for sponsorship reasons) was the 11th season of the Liga Indonesia Premier Division, the top Indonesian professional league for association football clubs.

== Teams ==
=== Team changes ===
==== Promoted to Premier Division ====
- Arema
- PSDS
- Persibom
- Persegi
- Persijap
- Persema
- Persekabpas
- Petrokimia Putra
- Persiba
- Persmin

=== Stadiums and locations ===
Locations of the teams in the 2005 Liga Indonesia Premier Division.
Blue: West Region; Red: East Region

West Region
Team	Location	Stadium
Arema	Malang	Kanjuruhan
Persib	Bandung	Siliwangi
Persija	Jakarta	Lebak Bulus
Persikota	Tangerang	Benteng
Persita	Tangerang	Benteng
PSDS	Deli Serdang	Baharuddin Siregar
PSMS	Medan	Teladan
PSPS	Pekanbaru	Kaharudin Nasution
PSS	Sleman	Tridadi
Semen Padang	Padang	Haji Agus Salim
Sriwijaya	Palembang	Jakabaring
Deltras	Sidoarjo	Gelora Delta
PSIS	Semarang	Jatidiri
Persekabpas	Pasuruan	R. Soedarsono

East Region
Team	Location	Stadium
Barito Putera	Banjarmasin	May 17th
Bontang PKT	Bontang	Mulawarman
Persegi	Gianyar	Kapten I Wayan Dipta
Pelita Krakatau Steel	Cilegon	Krakatau Steel
Persebaya	Surabaya	Gelora 10 November
Persela	Lamongan	Surajaya
Persema	Malang	Kanjuruhan
Persijap	Jepara	Kamal Djunaedi
Persipura	Jayapura	Mandala
Petrokimia Putra	Gresik	Petrokimia
PSM	Makassar	Andi Mattalata
Persibom	Bolaang Mongondow	Gelora Ambang Stadium
Persmin	Tondano	Maesa
Persik	Kediri	Brawijaya

== First stage ==
=== West Region ===
Pos	Team	Pld	W	D	L	GF	GA	GD	Pts	Qualification
1	Persija	26	15	4	7	42	21	+21	49	Advance to second stage
2	Arema	26	13	7	6	42	20	+22	46	Advance to second stage
3	PSIS	26	10	12	4	36	21	+15	42	Advance to second stage
4	PSMS	26	12	6	8	30	26	+4	42	Advance to second stage
5	Persib	26	10	8	8	32	26	+6	38	
6	Persekabpas	26	11	4	11	30	37	−7	37	
7	PSS	26	10	4	12	22	32	−10	34	
8	Persita	26	8	8	10	31	26	+5	32	
9	Sriwijaya	26	9	5	12	30	34	−4	32	
10	Semen Padang	26	9	5	12	24	30	−6	32	
11	Persikota	26	7	10	9	25	35	−10	31	
12	PSDS	26	8	6	12	32	45	−13	30	
13	Deltras (O)	26	7	8	11	33	43	−10	29	Qualification for relegation play-offs
14	PSPS (R)	26	6	7	13	29	42	−13	25	Qualification for relegation play-offs

Source: RSSSF
(O) Play-off winners; (R) Relegated

=== East Region ===
Pos	Team	Pld	W	D	L	GF	GA	GD	Pts	Qualification
1	Persipura (C)	26	14	4	8	31	17	+14	46	Advance to second stage
2	PSM	26	14	3	9	42	29	+13	45	Advance to second stage
3	Persik	26	13	4	9	44	28	+16	43	Advance to second stage
4	Persebaya	26	12	7	7	31	22	+9	43	Advance to second stage
5	Persiba	26	13	2	11	29	26	+3	41	
6	Bontang PKT	26	10	6	10	29	32	−3	36	
7	Persema	26	11	3	12	30	34	−4	36	
8	Persela	26	9	8	9	27	29	−2	35	
9	Persmin	26	10	4	12	24	28	−4	34	
10	Persegi	26	10	4	12	27	37	−10	34	
11	Persibom	26	10	4	12	21	30	−9	34	
12	Persijap	26	7	9	10	25	29	−4	30	
13	Pelita Krakatau Steel (R)	26	8	5	13	28	38	−10	29	Qualification for relegation play-offs
14	Petrokimia Putra (R)	26	7	5	14	32	41	−9	26	Qualification for relegation play-offs

Source: RSSSF
(R) Relegated

== Second stage ==
=== Group A ===
Pos	Team	Pld	W	D	L	GF	GA	GD	Pts	Qualification or relegation
1	Persija	3	2	1	0	5	1	+4	7	Advance to final
2	PSIS	3	2	0	1	3	1	+2	6	Advance to third-place match
3	PSM	3	0	2	1	3	5	−2	2	
4	Persebaya (Note: Persebaya were relegated by Liga Indonesia for abandoning their match against Persija on 21 September 2005.) (R)	3	0	1	2	2	6	−4	1	Relegation to First Division

Source: RSSSF
(R) Relegated
Notes:
16 September 2005
15:30 WIB

Persija Jakarta	1–0	PSIS Semarang
Agus 76'

Gelora Bung Karno Stadium, Jakarta
16 September 2005
19:00 WIB

PSM	2–2	Persebaya
Moreno 3'; Lima 32'		Adolfo 10'; Leonardo 40'

Gelora Bung Karno Stadium, Jakarta

18 September 2005
15:30 WIB

Persija	1–1	PSM
Agus 50'		Herman 66'

Gelora Bung Karno Stadium, Jakarta
18 September 2005
19:00 WIB

PSIS	1–0	Persebaya
Benson 78'

Gelora Bung Karno Stadium, Jakarta

21 September 2005
15:30 WIB

Persija	3–0 (w/o)	Persebaya

Gelora Bung Karno Stadium, Jakarta
21 September 2005
19:00 WIB

PSM	0–2	PSIS
		Ridwan 10'; De Porras 70'

Lebak Bulus Stadium, Jakarta

=== Group B ===
Pos	Team	Pld	W	D	L	GF	GA	GD	Pts	Qualification
1	Persipura	3	3	0	0	3	0	+3	9	Advance to final
2	PSMS	3	1	1	1	2	2	0	4	Advance to third-place match
3	Persik	3	1	0	2	3	3	0	3	
4	Arema	3	0	1	2	0	3	−3	1	

Source: RSSSF
16 September 2005
15:30 WIT

Persipura	1–0	Persik
Marwal 76'

Mandala Stadium, Jayapura
16 September 2005
19:00 WIT

Arema	0–0	PSMS

Mandala Stadium, Jayapura

18 September 2005
15:30 WIT

Persipura	1–0	Arema
Ivakdalam 15'

Mandala Stadium, Jayapura
18 September 2005
19:00 WIT

Persik	1–2	PSMS
Gonzáles 69'		Carrasco 22', 74'

Mandala Stadium, Jayapura

21 September 2005
15:30 WIT

Persipura	1–0	PSMS
Ivakdalam 36'

Mandala Stadium, Jayapura
21 September 2005
19:00 WIT

Arema	0–2	Persik
		Yuwana 14'; Gonzáles 60'

Sanggeng, Manokwari

== Third-place match ==
25 September 2005
15:30 WIB

PSIS	2–1	PSMS
Ridwan 12'; Salisbury 78'		Fleitas 21'

Gelora Bung Karno Stadium, Jakarta

== Final ==
25 September 2005
19:00 WIB

Persija	2–3 (a.e.t.)	Persipura
Agus 10'; Wewengkang 55'		Boaz 18'; Fingkreuw 82'; Kabes 101'

Gelora Bung Karno Stadium, Jakarta
Attendance: 80,000
Referee: Purwanto

== Relegation play-offs ==
Due to the forced relegation of Persebaya Surabaya, the bottom two teams from each division compete in the play-offs for the last remaining place in the 2006 season. All matches were held in Si Jalak Harupat Stadium.

Pos	Team	Pld	W	D	L	GF	GA	GD	Pts	Relegation
1	Deltras	3	2	1	0	7	1	+6	7	
2	Pelita Krakatau Steel	3	2	0	1	4	3	+1	6	Relegation to First Division
3	PSPS	3	1	1	1	2	2	0	4	Relegation to First Division
4	Petrokimia Putra	3	0	0	3	1	8	−7	0	Relegation to First Division

Source: RSSSF
4 January 2006
15:30 WIB

Pelita Krakatau Steel	0–2	Deltras
		Braga 70', 74'

Si Jalak Harupat Stadium, Bandung
4 January 2006
19:00 WIB

Petrokimia Putra	0–1	PSPS
		Lopez 59'

Si Jalak Harupat Stadium, Bandung

6 January 2006
15:30 WIB

Deltras	4–0	Petrokimia Putra
Moreira 14'; Braga 52', 86'; Marcos 59'

Si Jalak Harupat Stadium, Bandung
6 January 2006
19:00 WIB

PSPS	0–1	Pelita Krakatau Steel
		Benben 88'

Si Jalak Harupat Stadium, Bandung

9 January 2006
15:30 WIB

Pelita Krakatau Steel	3–1	Petrokimia Putra
Eki 12', 44'; Nasuha 72'		Eko 89'

Si Jalak Harupat Stadium, Bandung
9 January 2006
15:30 WIB

PSPS	1–1	Deltras
Agung 33' (o.g.)		Moreira 9'

Angkasa Margahayu, Bandung

== Awards ==
=== Top scorers ===
This is a list of the top scorers from the 2005 season.

Rank	Player	Club	Goals
1	(Uruguay) Cristian Gonzáles	Persik	25
2	(Chile) Cristian Carrasco	PSMS	17
3	(Cameroon) Roger Batoum	Persija	15
4	(Paraguay) Osvaldo Moreno	PSM	14
5	(Nigeria) Ekene Ikenwa	Persib	13
5	(Argentina) Emanuel De Porras	PSIS	13
7	(Indonesia) Rochy Putiray	PSPS	12
8	(Brazil) Hilton Moreira	Deltras	11
8	(Nigeria) Anoure Obiora	PSDS	11

=== Best player ===
(Indonesia) Christian Warobay (Persipura)
