= Persegi Bali F.C. =

Indonesian football club

Persegi Bali FC
- Full name: Persegi Bali Football Club
- Nickname: Tim Kuda Jingkrak
- Founded: 2006
- Dissolved: 2011
- Ground: Kapten I Wayan Dipta Stadium
- Capacity: 20,000
- League: Liga Indonesia Premier Division
Home colours	Away colours

Persatuan Sepakbola Gianyar or Persegi (registered as Persegi Bali FC) is an Indonesian football club based in Gianyar Regency.

== History ==
When club named Persegi Gianyar, the club hit by financial difficulties in 2005 and decided to dissolve the club. This led to an opportunity for other clubs from Bali to merge and form a club using Persegi Gianyar's license to compete in the Liga Indonesia. Local clubs such as Perseden Denpasar, Persekaba Badung, and Perst Tabanan merged with Persegi Gianyar to form a new club called Persegi Bali FC.

== Season-by-season records ==
Season	League/Division	Tms.	Pos.	Piala Indonesia
1999–2000	Second Division			–
2001	First Division	23	4th, Central Group 1	–
2002	First Division	27	4	–
2003	First Division	26	3rd, Group C	–
2004	First Division	24	4	–
2005	Premier Division	28	10th, East division	Quarter-final
2006	Premier Division	28	14th, East division	First round
2007–08	Premier Division	36	18th, East division	First round
2008–09	Premier Division	29	Withdrew	–
