= Yahukimo F.C. =

Indonesian football club

Yahukimo
- Full name: Yahukimo Football Club
- Nickname: Burung Puyuh Salju
- Founded: 1 January 1970, as Persekaba Badung
- Ground: Barnabas Youwe Stadium
- Capacity: 15,000
- Owner: PT. Yahukimo Indosport
- Coach: Rivai Arsyad
- League: Liga 4
- 2017: Liga 2, 2nd in Group F (Relegated)
Home colours	Away colours

Yahukimo Football Club is an Indonesian football club based in Yahukimo Regency, Highland Papua. This club played in Liga 4.

== History ==
The club was previously named Persekaba Badung based on Gelora Samudra Stadium, Badung, Bali. In 2007 Liga Indonesia First Division, Persekaba moved its headquarters to Yahukimo Regency. However, they used the Pendidikan Stadium, Wamena, Jayawijaya Regency to play their home game. Due to this reason, the club changed its name to Persekaba Yahukimo FC. Since the start of the 2010–11 season, the team used the name Yahukimo FC.

=== Name ===
- Persekaba Badung (1970; lists the major shareholder of the Government Badung Regency)
- Persekaba Yahukimo FC (2007–2010; includes the name of the owner of a majority stake Persekaba Badung)
- Yahukimo FC (2011–present; includes the name of the owner of a majority stake Yahukimo FC)

== Season-by-season records ==
As Persekaba Badung

Season	League	Tier	Tms.	Pos.	Piala Indonesia
1998–99	Second Division	3		Promoted	–
1999–2000	First Division	2	21	4th, Central Group II	–
2001	First Division	2	23	3	–
2002	First Division	2	27	4th, Group 3	–
2003	First Division	2	26	4th, Group B	–
2004	First Division	2	24	9th, West division	–
2005	First Division	2	27	3rd, Group II	Quarter-final
2006	First Division	2	36	4th, Group IV	Second round

As Persekaba Yahukimo/Yahukimo FC

Season	League	Tier	Tms.	Pos.	Piala Indonesia
2007	First Division	2	40	5th, Group IV	Qualifying round
2008–09	First Division	3	48	Fist round	–
2009–10	First Division	3	60	Withdrew	–
2010	First Division	3	57	2nd, Group XI	–
2012	First Division	3	56	6th, Third round	–
2013	Premier Division	2	39	8th, Group 4	–
2014	Premier Division	2	63	6th, Group 8	–
2015	Premier Division	2	55	did not finish	–
2016	ISC B	2	53	3rd, Group 8	–
2017	Liga 2	2	61	2nd, Relegation round	–
2018	Liga 3	3	32	Disqualified	First round

== Supporters ==
Yahukimonia is the name of the club supporters
