= 2006 Copa Indonesia =

Tournament details
- Country: Indonesia

Final positions
- Champions: Arema Malang (2nd title)
- Runners-up: Persipura Jayapura

Tournament statistics
- Top goal scorer(s): Serge Emaleu (9 goals)

The 2006 Copa Indonesia was the second edition of Piala Indonesia, the nationwide football cup tournament in Indonesia, involving clubs from Premier Division, First Division and Second Division. The winner of the tournament qualified to play for 2007 AFC Champions League.

Arema Malang became champions after a victory over Persipura Jayapura in the final match at Gelora Delta Stadium, Sidoarjo.

== First round ==
=== Region I ===
Team 1	Agg.	Team 2	1st leg	2nd leg
PSMS Medan	5 – 1	Sriwijaya	3 – 1	2 – 0
Perserang Serang	3 – 5	Persikota Tangerang	1 – 0	2 – 5
PS Palembang	1 – 3	Persitara North Jakarta	1 – 1	0 – 2
Persita Tangerang	2 – 0	PSKPS Padang Sidempuan	2 – 0	0 – 0
PSPS Pekanbaru	4 – 1	PSBL Langsa	1 – 1	3 – 0
Medan Jaya	2 – 3	PSP Padang	2 – 1	0 – 2
PSDS Deli Serdang	3 – 5	PSSB Bireun	1 – 3	2 – 2
Persiraja Banda Aceh	2 – 6	Semen Padang	1 – 0	1 – 6

=== Region II ===
Team 1	Agg.	Team 2	1st leg	2nd leg
Persikad Depok	3 – 0	PSIM Yogyakarta	0 – 0	3 – 0
Persib Bandung	1 – 2	PSIS Semarang	0 – 0	1 – 2
Persiku Kudus	w/o	Persiba Bantul	1 – 0	–
PSB Bogor	1 – 4	Persipur Purwodadi	0 – 2	1 – 2
Persipasi Bekasi	w/o	Persikabo Bogor	0 – 1	1 – 0
Persibat Batang	1 – 3	Persija Jakarta	0 – 0	1 – 3
Persijap Jepara	0 – 3	Pelita Jaya Purwakarta	0 – 0	0 – 3
Persikab Bandung	w/o	PSS Sleman	–	–

=== Region III ===
Team 1	Agg.	Team 2	1st leg	2nd leg
Persebaya Surabaya	3 – 1	PS Mojokerto Putra	2 – 1	1 – 0
Persegi Gianyar	2 – 5	Persekaba Badung	2 – 1	0 – 4
Persedikab Kediri	0 – 3	Persibo Bojonegoro	0 – 1	0 – 2
Persipro Probolinggo	0 – 6	Arema Malang	0 – 2	0 – 4
Persid Jember	0 – 7	Persela Lamongan	0 – 1	0 – 6
Persik Kediri	5 – 1	Persekabpas Pasuruan	3 – 0	2 – 1
Gresik United	4 – 4 (a)	Persema Malang	3 – 3	1 – 1
Persis Solo	3 – 5	Deltras Sidoarjo	3 – 1	0 – 4

=== Region IV ===
Team 1	Agg.	Team 2	1st leg	2nd leg
Persmin Minahasa	2 – 1	Mitra Kukar	1 – 0	1 – 1
Persma Manado	5 – 4	Persigo Gorontalo	0 – 3	5 – 1
Persibom Bolaang Mongondow	7 – 3	Perseman Manokwari	5 – 1	2 – 2
Persipura Jayapura	7 – 0	Persipare Pare-Pare	5 – 0	2 – 0
Persim Maros	4 – 6	PKT Bontang	2 – 1	2 – 5
Persiba Balikpapan	3 – 1	Persiter Ternate	2 – 0	1 – 1
Persiwa Wamena	w/o	Persiss Sorong	–	–

== Second round ==
Team 1	Agg.	Team 2	1st leg	2nd leg
Persipura Jayapura	4 – 2	Persiba Balikpapan	4 – 0	0 – 2
Persitara North Jakarta	2 – 3	Persikota Tangerang	0 – 1	2 – 2
Persita Tangerang	3 – 3 (3 – 4 p)	PSMS Medan	2 – 1	1 – 2
Persebaya Surabaya	2 – 1	Persela Lamongan	2 – 0	0 – 1
PSSB Bireun	2 – 2 (a)	PSP Padang	1 – 0	1 – 2
Persipur Purwodadi	(a) 1 – 1	Persipasi Bekasi	0 – 0	1 – 1
Persikab Bandung	3 – 2	Pelita Jaya Purwakarta	2 – 1	1 – 1
Persema Malang	1 – 2	Deltras Sidoarjo	1 – 1	0 – 1
Persibom Bolaang Mongondow	0 – 1	PKT Bontang	0 – 0	0 – 1
Arema Malang	2 – 1	Persekaba Badung	2 – 0	0 – 1
Persiwa Wamena	5 – 4	PSM Makassar	3 – 1	2 – 3
Persik Kediri	5 – 4	Persibo Bojonegoro	4 – 2	1 – 2
Semen Padang	4 – 1	PSPS Pekanbaru	2 – 0	2 – 1
Persija Jakarta	2 – 0	PSIS Semarang	1 – 0	1 – 0
Persiku Kudus	w/o	Persikad Depok	–	–
Persma Manado	w/o	Persmin Minahasa	–	–

== Third round ==
Team 1	Agg.	Team 2	1st leg	2nd leg
Persipura Jayapura	3 – 0	Persikab Bandung	2 – 0	1 – 0
Arema Malang	6 – 0	Persipur Purwodadi	4 – 0	2 – 0
Persik Kediri	3 – 5	PSMS Medan	2 – 1	1 – 4
Persiwa Wamena	2 – 2 (a)	Semen Padang	2 – 1	0 – 1
Deltras Sidoarjo	1 – 1 (3 – 2 p)	Persikota Tangerang	0 – 1	1 – 0
PSSB Bireun	1 – 4	Persija Jakarta	0 – 1	1 – 3
Persiku Kudus	3 – 6	Persma Manado	1 – 2	2 – 4
PKT Bontang	3 – 7	Persebaya Surabaya	3 – 2	0 – 5

== Quarterfinal ==
Team 1	Agg.	Team 2	1st leg	2nd leg
Semen Padang	1 – 3	Persija Jakarta	1 – 2	0 – 1
Persma Manado	1 – 7	PSMS Medan	0 – 3	1 – 4
Arema Malang	1 – 0	Persebaya Surabaya	1 – 0	0 – 0
Persipura Jayapura	3 – 2	Deltras Sidoarjo	2 – 1	1 – 1

== Semifinal ==
Team 1	Agg.	Team 2	1st leg	2nd leg
PSMS Medan	3 – 5	Arema Malang	1 – 1	2 – 4
Persija Jakarta	1 – 3	Persipura Jayapura	1 – 1	0 – 2

== Third place ==
16 September 2006
15.30 WIB

Persija Jakarta	2 – 0 (HT : 1 – 0)	PSMS Medan
Eric Mabenga 40'; Roger Batoum 55'

Gelora Delta Stadium, Sidoarjo
Attendance: 10,155

== Final ==
16 September 2006
19.00 WIB

Arema Malang	2 – 0 (HT : 0 – 0)	Persipura Jayapura
Aris Budi Prasetyo 51' (pen.); Anthony Jomah Ballah 58'	Report

Gelora Delta Stadium, Sidoarjo
Attendance: 20,000
Referee: Jimmy Napitupulu (South Jakarta)
