= 2005 Copa Indonesia =

Tournament details
- Country: Indonesia

Final positions
- Champions: Arema Malang (1st title)
- Runners-up: Persija Jakarta

Tournament statistics
- Top goal scorer(s): Javier Roca (11 goals)

The 2005 Copa Indonesia was the first edition of Piala Indonesia, the nationwide football cup tournament in Indonesia, involving clubs from Premier Division, First Division and Second Division. The winner of the tournament qualified to play for 2006 AFC Champions League.

Arema Malang became champions after a victory over Persija Jakarta in the final match at Gelora Bung Karno Stadium, Jakarta.

== First round ==
=== Region I ===
Team 1	Agg.	Team 2	1st leg	2nd leg
PSSA Asahan	2 – 10	PSDS Deli Serdang	1 – 5	1 – 5
PS Palembang	0 – 7	Sriwijaya	0 – 3	0 – 4
PSBL Bandar Lampung	3 – 6	PSPS Pekanbaru	2 – 1	1 – 5
PSMS Medan	5 – 1	PSP Padang	3 – 0	2 – 1
Persemai Dumai	3 – 3 (a)	Semen Padang	2 – 2	1 – 1

=== Region II ===
Team 1	Agg.	Team 2	1st leg	2nd leg
Persija Jakarta	7 – 2	Persikad Depok	5 – 1	2 – 1
Persikab Bandung	3 – 5	Persikota Tangerang	2 – 2	1 – 3
Persikabo Bogor	3 – 1	Pelita Krakatau Steel	2 – 0	1 – 1
Medan Jaya	3 – 10	Persita Tangerang	2 – 5	1 – 5
PSIS Semarang	6 – 2	Pro Duta	3 – 0	3 – 2
Persib Bandung	(p) 1 – 1	Persitara North Jakarta	1 – 0	0 – 1

=== Region III ===
Team 1	Agg.	Team 2	1st leg	2nd leg
Persijap Jepara	4 – 0	Persipur Purwodadi	4 – 0	0 – 0
Persiku Kudus	4 – 5	PSIM Yogyakarta	4 – 0	0 – 5
PSS Sleman	(a) 4 – 4	Persiba Bantul	3 – 0	1 – 4
PSIS Semarang	6 – 2	Persibat Batang	2 – 0	4 – 2

=== Region IV ===
Team 1	Agg.	Team 2	1st leg	2nd leg
Deltras Sidoarjo	5 – 1	Persid Jember	4 – 0	1 – 1
Persik Kediri	8 – 3	PS Mojokerto Putra	6 – 0	2 – 3
Persema Malang	3 – 2	Persibo Bojonegoro	3 – 1	0 – 1
Persekabpas Pasuruan	4 – 0	Persedikab Kediri	4 – 0	0 – 0
Perserang Serang	3 – 6	Petrokimia Putra	0 – 2	3 – 4
Arema Malang	4 – 2	Persela Lamongan	4 – 2	0 – 0
Persebaya Surabaya	bye		–	–

=== Region V ===
Team 1	Agg.	Team 2	1st leg	2nd leg
Persiba Balikpapan	1 – 1	Mitra Kukar	1 – 1	0 – 0
PKT Bontang	8 – 4	Barito Putra	8 – 0	0 – 4

=== Region VI ===
Team 1	Agg.	Team 2	1st leg	2nd leg
Persibom Bolaang Mongondow	4 – 1	Persma Manado	3 – 0	1 – 1
Persim Maros	1 – 2	Persipare Pare-Pare	1 – 0	0 – 2
Persmin Minahasa	6 – 2	Persigo Gorontalo	2 – 1	4 – 1
Gaspa Palopo	2 – 3	Persiter Ternate	2 – 0	0 – 3
PSM Makassar	bye		–	–

=== Region VII ===
Team 1	Agg.	Team 2	1st leg	2nd leg
Persipro Probolinggo	0 – 12	Persegi Gianyar	0 – 3	0 – 9
Persekaba Badung	1 – 0	Perseden Denpasar	0 – 0	1 – 0

=== Region VIII ===
Team 1	Agg.	Team 2	1st leg	2nd leg
Persiwa Wamena	3 – 2	Persidafon Dafonsoro	1 – 1	2 – 1
Perseman Manokwari	1 – 1 (a)	Persipura Jayapura	1 – 1	0 – 0

== Bracket ==
Round of 16
Persik	7	1	8
Persikabo	0	1	1
PSMS	4	0	4
Persiter	0	1	1
Persijap	2	1	3
Persekaba	2	3	5
Persija	2	0	2
Persmin	0	1	1
Persita	1	0	1
PSS	1	1	2
Persebaya	0	1	1
Persipura	0	0	0
Semen	1	1	2
Persegi	0	3	3
PSDS	1	1	2
Arema	4	2	6

Quarter-finals
Persik	1	0	1
PSMS	1	1	2
Persekaba	1	0	1
Persija	1	1	2
PSS	3	3	6
Persebaya	0	0	0
Persegi	0	0	0
Arema	3	3	6

Semi-finals
PSMS	2	1	3
Persija	1	3	4
PSS	0	0	0
Arema	2	3	5

Final
19 Nov – Jakarta
Persija	3
Arema	4

== Second round ==
Team 1	Agg.	Team 2	1st leg	2nd leg
Persija Jakarta	4 – 3	Persikota Tangerang	2 – 3	2 – 0
PKT Bontang	2 – 2 (a)	PSS Sleman	2 – 1	0 – 1
PSPS Pekanbaru	2 – 3	PSDS Deli Serdang	1 – 0	1 – 3
Persijap Jepara	5 – 3	PSIS Semarang	2 – 1	3 – 2
Persipare Pare-Pare	2 – 6	Persmin Minahasa	1 – 3	1 – 3
Sriwijaya	1 – 2	Semen Padang	1 – 0	0 – 2
Persiwa Wamena	1 – 3	Persiter Ternate	0 – 0	1 – 3
PSM Makassar	3 – 6	Persekaba Badung	3 – 2	0 – 4
Persekabpas Pasuruan	1 – 3	Persegi Gianyar	0 – 0	1 – 3
PSIM Yogyakarta	1 – 2	Persikabo Bogor	1 – 0	0 – 2
Persibom Bolaang Mongondow	2 – 7	Persipura Jayapura	2 – 1	0 – 6
Persema Malang	0 – 1	Persebaya Surabaya	0 – 0	0 – 1
Petrokimia Putra	2 – 4	Persik Kediri	2 – 2	0 – 2
Persita Tangerang	6 – 2	Mitra Kukar	4 – 0	2 – 2
Arema Malang	7 – 0	Deltras Sidoarjo	4 – 0	3 – 0
PSMS Medan	5 – 1	Persib Bandung	5 – 0	0 – 1

== Third round ==
Number of teams per tier still in competition
Premier Division	First Division	Second Division
13 / 28	3 / 30	0 / 24

Team 1	Agg.	Team 2	1st leg	2nd leg
Persita Tangerang	1 – 2	PSS Sleman	1 – 1	0 – 1
Persik Kediri	8 – 1	Persikabo Bogor	7 – 0	1 – 1
Persijap Jepara	3 – 5	Persekaba Badung	2 – 2	1 – 3
PSDS Deli Serdang	2 – 6	Arema Malang	1 – 4	1 – 2
Semen Padang	2 – 3	Persegi Gianyar	1 – 0	1 – 3
PSMS Medan	4 – 1	Persiter Ternate	4 – 0	0 – 1
Persija Jakarta	2 – 1	Persmin Minahasa	2 – 0	0 – 1
Persebaya Surabaya	1 – 0	Persipura Jayapura	0 – 0	1 – 0

== Quarterfinal ==
Number of teams per tier still in competition
Premier Division	First Division	Second Division
7 / 28	1 / 30	0 / 24

Team 1	Agg.	Team 2	1st leg	2nd leg
PSS Sleman	w/o	Persebaya Surabaya	–	–
Persegi Gianyar	w/o	Arema Malang	–	–
Persik Kediri	1 – 2	PSMS Medan	1 – 1	0 – 1
Persekaba Badung	1 – 2	Persija Jakarta	1 – 1	0 – 1

== Semifinal ==
Number of teams per tier still in competition
Premier Division	First Division	Second Division
4 / 28	0 / 30	0 / 24

Team 1	Agg.	Team 2	1st leg	2nd leg
PSS Sleman	0 – 5	Arema Malang	0 – 2	0 – 3
PSMS Medan	3 – 4	Persija Jakarta	2 – 1	1 – 3

== Final ==
19 November 2005
19.00 WIB

Persija Jakarta	3 – 4 (a.e.t.)	Arema Malang
Adolfo Fatecha 12'; Roger Batoum 57' (pen.); Kurniawan D.Y 89'	Report	20' Franco Hitta; 55', 86', 96' Firman Utina

Gelora Bung Karno Stadium, Jakarta
Attendance: 55,000
Referee: Jajat Sudrajat (Bandung)
