= Piala Indonesia =

- Organiser(s): PSSI
- Founded: 2005; 21 years ago as Copa Indonesia; 2010; 16 years ago as Piala Indonesia
- Region: Indonesia
- Teams: 62 (2005); 62 (2006); 92 (2007–08); 52 (2008–09); 32 (2010); 40 (2012); 128 (2018–19)
- Qualifier for: AFC Champions League Two
- Current champions: PSM Makassar
- Most championships: Sriwijaya (3 titles)
- 2027–28 Piala Indonesia

Piala Indonesia (lit. 'Indonesia Cup') is the professional annual cup competition for football clubs in Indonesia. The Football Association of Indonesia (PSSI) organized the full professional cup competition from 2005 until the most recent in 2018–19. Traditionally, the tournament involves clubs from the whole layers of Indonesian football league system, which are Super League, Championship, Liga Nusantara and Liga 4

Piala Indonesia winners qualify for the AFC Champions League Two the following season. Sriwijaya is the most successful club in the competition, with three titles.

== History ==
PSSI started the professional cup competition in 2005, under the name of Copa Dji Sam Soe Indonesia until 2009 for sponsorship reasons, after which the name of the tournament was changed to the Piala Indonesia. In 2012, after a one-year hiatus, the Indonesian football "dualism" meant only Indonesian Premier League (IPL) clubs competed; Persibo Bojonegoro won that year's Indonesia Cup.

The competition returned for the 2018–19 edition after six years of hiatus because it was at the time replaced by Piala Presiden. In 2018, Kratingdaeng became the title sponsor of Piala Indonesia.

The competition has not been held on several occasions, in 2015–16 due to the PSSI's ban on handling all of the football competitions by FIFA and since 2020 partially due to the COVID-19 pandemic, the lack of sponsor, the election, and geographical factors that made it hard for clubs to play without rest.

== Finals ==
=== One-legged ===
Season	Competition name	City/Regency	Winner	Score	Runners-Up	Venue
2005	Copa Indonesia	Jakarta	Arema Malang	4–3 (a.e.t.)	Persija Jakarta	Gelora Bung Karno Stadium
2006	Copa Indonesia	Sidoarjo	Arema Malang	2–0	Persipura Jayapura	Gelora Delta Stadium
2007–08	Copa Indonesia	Jakarta	Sriwijaya	1–1 (3–0 p)	Persipura Jayapura	Gelora Bung Karno Stadium
2008–09	Copa Indonesia	Palembang	Sriwijaya	4–0 (Note: Sriwijaya were awarded the victory (4–0) after Persipura walked out of the match in the 60th minute to protest the officiating when Sriwijaya were leading 1–0.)	Persipura Jayapura	Jakabaring Stadium
2010	Piala Indonesia	Surakarta	Sriwijaya	2–1	Arema Indonesia	Manahan Stadium
2012	Piala Indonesia	Bantul	Persibo Bojonegoro	1–0	Semen Padang	Sultan Agung Stadium
2027–28						

=== Two-legged ===
Season	Competition name	City/Regency	Home	Score	Away	Location
2018–19	Piala Indonesia	Jakarta	Persija Jakarta	1–0	PSM Makassar	Gelora Bung Karno Stadium
2018–19	Piala Indonesia	Makassar	PSM Makassar	2–0	Persija Jakarta	Andi Mattalata Stadium
2018–19	Piala Indonesia	PSM Makassar won 2–1 on aggregate				

== Competition record ==
*	Current holder
‡	Record champions

Club	Titles	Runners-up	Years Won
Sriwijaya‡	3	—	2007–08, 2008–09, 2010
Arema	2	1	2005, 2006
Persibo Bojonegoro	1	—	2012
PSM Makassar*	1	—	2018–19
Persipura Jayapura	—	3	—
Persija Jakarta	—	2	—
Semen Padang	—	1	—

== Awards ==
=== Top scorers ===
Year	Player	Club	Goals
2005	(Chile) Javier Roca	Persegi Gianyar	11
2006	(Cameroon) Serge Emaleu	Arema Malang	9
2007–08	(Brazil) Alberto Goncalves	Persipura Jayapura	6
2008–09	(Indonesia) Samsul Arif	Persibo Bojonegoro	8
2008–09	(Argentina) Pablo Frances	Persijap Jepara	8
2010	(Indonesia) Cristian Gonzáles	Persib Bandung	10
2012	(Liberia) Oliver Makor	Persik Kediri	6
2018–19	(Guinea-Bissau) Amido Baldé	Persebaya Surabaya	10
2018–19	(Indonesia) Zulham Zamrun	PSM Makassar	10

=== Best players ===
Year	Player	Club
2005	(Indonesia) Firman Utina	Arema Malang
2006	(Indonesia) Aris Budi Prasetyo	Arema Malang
2007–08	(Indonesia) Bambang Pamungkas	Persija Jakarta
2008–09	(Nigeria) Anoure Obiora Richard	Sriwijaya
2010	(Saint Kitts and Nevis) Keith Gumbs	Sriwijaya
2012	(Indonesia) Dian Irawan	Persibo Bojonegoro
2018–19	(Indonesia) Zulham Zamrun	PSM Makassar

== Title sponsor ==
Year	Name	Brand	Ref.
2005–2009	Dji Sam Soe	Copa Dji Sam Soe	
2010–2018	No Sponsor	Piala Indonesia	
2018–2019	Krating Daeng	Kratingdaeng Piala Indonesia	

== See also ==
- List of football clubs in Indonesia by major honours won
- Indonesian Community Shield
- I-League Cup
- Piala Presiden
