= 2011–12 Indonesia Super League goalscorers =

Below is a list of top scorer Indonesia Super League in the 2011-12 season. Last season Boaz Solossa (Persipura Jayapura) won the top scorer in the Indonesia Super League by scoring 22 goals.

== Goal-scorers ==
Including matches played on 11 July 2012.

25 goals

- (Brazil) Alberto Gonçalves (Persipura Jayapura)

22 goals

- (Argentina) Mario Costas (Persela Lamongan)
- (Saint Kitts and Nevis) Keith Gumbs (Sriwijaya)

20 goals

- (Indonesia) Greg Nwokolo (Pelita Jaya)
- (Malaysia) Safee Sali (Pelita Jaya)

19 goals

- (Liberia) Boakay Eddie Foday (Persiwa Wamena)
- (Nigeria) Osas Marvelous (PSMS Medan)

18 goals

- (Indonesia) Cristian Gonzáles (Persisam Putra Samarinda)
- (Brazil) Hilton Moreira (Sriwijaya)

17 goals

- (Paraguay) Aldo Barreto (Persiba Balikpapan)

16 goals

- (Indonesia) Bambang Pamungkas (Persija Jakarta)
- (Paraguay) Pedro Velázquez (Persija Jakarta)
- (Cameroon) Dzumafo Herman Epandi (PSPS Pekanbaru/Arema Indonesia)

15 goals

- (Brazil) Marcio Souza (Arema Indonesia/Persib Bandung)
- (Argentina) Gaston Castano (Gresik United)
- (Indonesia) Yohanes Pahabol (Persidafon Dafonsoro)
- (Cameroon) Jean Paul Boumsong (Persiram Raja Ampat)

14 goals

- (Indonesia) Patrich Wanggai (Persidafon Dafonsoro)

13 goals

- (Indonesia) Jajang Mulyana (Mitra Kukar)
- (Japan) Kenji Adachihara (Persiba Balikpapan)
- (Liberia) Lewis Weeks (Persiwa Wamena)

12 goals

- (Mali) Camara Sekou (PSAP Sigli)

11 goals

- (Montenegro) Miljan Radovic (Persib Bandung)

10 goals

- (North Macedonia) Aleksandar Bajevski (Pelita Jaya)

9 goals

- (Argentina) Gustavo Lopez (Persela Lamongan)
- (Indonesia) Pieter Rumaropen (Persiwa Wamena)
- (Indonesia) Zaenal Arif (PSPS Pekanbaru)

8 goals

- (Liberia) Zah Rahan (Persipura Jayapura)
- (Indonesia) Muhammad Ridwan (Sriwijaya)

7 goals

- (Liberia) James Koko Lomell (Gresik United/Deltras)
- (Syria) Marwan Sayedeh (Gresik United)
- (Indonesia) Zulham Zamrun (Mitra Kukar)
- (Japan) Shohei Matsunaga (Persiba Balikpapan)
- (Indonesia) Boaz Solossa (Persipura Jayapura)
- (Australia) Boima Karpeh (Persisam Putra Samarinda)
- (Indonesia) Jaelaniu Arey (Persiwa Wamena)
- (South Korea) Yoo Wook-Jin (PSAP Sigli/Persiram Raja Ampat)
- (Cameroon) Patrice Nzekou (PSPS Pekanbaru)

6 goals

- (Indonesia) Muhammad Fakhrudin (Deltras)
- (Indonesia) Qischil G. Minny (Deltras)
- (Serbia) Nemanja Obrić (Mitra Kukar)
- (Liberia) John Tarkpor (Pelita Jaya)
- (Indonesia) Atep (Persib Bandung)
- (Indonesia) Eduard Ivakdalam (Persidafon Dafonsoro)
- (Indonesia) Rahmat Affandi (Persija Jakarta)
- (Indonesia) Elthon Maran (Persiram Raja Ampat)

5 goals

- Arif Ariyanto (Arema Indonesia)
- (Cameroon) Seme Pattrick (Arema Indonesia)
- (Indonesia) Victor Igbonefo (Pelita Jaya)
- (Indonesia) Jimmy Suparno (Persela Lamongan)
- (Indonesia) Airlangga Sucipto (Persib Bandung)
- (Indonesia) Asri Akbar (Persiba Balikpapan)
- (Indonesia) Sultan Samma (Persiba Balikpapan)
- (Cameroon) Bio Paulin (Persipura Jayapura)
- (Indonesia) Yoseph Ostanika (PSMS Medan)
- (Indonesia) Firman Utina (Sriwijaya)
- (Indonesia) Siswanto (Sriwijaya)
- (Cameroon) Thierry Gathuessi (Sriwijaya)

4 goals

- (Singapore) Muhammad Ridhuan (Arema Indonesia)
- (Australia) Sean Rooney (Deltras)
- (Argentina) Esteban José Herrera (Mitra Kukar)
- (England) Marcus Bent (Mitra Kukar)
- (Indonesia) Saktiawan Sinaga (Mitra Kukar)
- (Indonesia) Joko Sasongko (Pelita Jaya)
- (Indonesia) Gery Setia (Persela Lamongan)
- (Slovakia) Roman Golian (Persela Lamongan)
- (Singapore) Noh Alam Shah (Persib Bandung)
- (Indonesia) Ahmad Sembiring (Persiba Balikpapan)
- (Indonesia) Lukas Rumkabu (Persidafon Dafonsoro)
- (Argentina) Marcelo Cirelli (Persidafon Dafonsoro)
- (Brazil) Fabiano Beltrame (Persija Jakarta)
- (Indonesia) Ramdani Lestaluhu (Persija Jakarta)
- (Indonesia) Ian Louis Kabes (Persipura Jayapura)
- (Indonesia) Lukas Mandowen (Persipura Jayapura)
- (Indonesia) Eka Ramdani (Persisam Putra Samarinda)
- (Montenegro) Srđan Lopičić (Persisam Putra Samarinda)
- (Indonesia) Yongki Aribowo (Persisam Putra Samarinda)
- (Sierra Leone) Abu Bakar Bah (PSAP Sigli)
- (Chile) Luis Alejandro Peña (PSMS Medan)
- (Indonesia) Zulkarnain (PSMS Medan)
- (Indonesia) April Hadi (PSPS Pekanbaru)
- (Indonesia) Muhammad Isnaini (PSPS Pekanbaru)

3 goals

- (Cameroon) Alain N'Kong (Arema Indonesia)
- Feri Aman Saragih (Arema Indonesia)
- (Ivory Coast) Lacine Kone (Deltras)
- (Argentina) Gustavo Chena (Gresik United)
- (Indonesia) Uston Nawawi (Gresik United)
- (Indonesia) Ahmad Bustomi (Mitra Kukar)
- (Indonesia) Hamka Hamzah (Mitra Kukar)
- (South Korea) Lee Sang-Min (Mitra Kukar)
- (Indonesia) Jajang Sukmara (Persib Bandung)
- (Indonesia) Maman Abdurahman (Persib Bandung)
- (Ghana) Moses Sakyi (Persib Bandung)
- (Indonesia) Muhammad Ilham (Persib Bandung)
- (Indonesia) Rachmat Latief (Persiba Balikpapan)
- (Indonesia) Rasmoyo (Persidafon Dafonsoro)
- (Argentina) Robertino Pugliara (Persija Jakarta)
- (Indonesia) Titus Bonai (Persipura Jayapura)
- (Indonesia) Yustinus Pae (Persipura Jayapura)
- (Brazil) Anderson da Silva (Persiram Raja Ampat)
- (Indonesia) Oktavianus Maniani (Persiram Raja Ampat)
- (Indonesia) Sayuti (PSAP Sigli)
- (Slovenia) Nastja Čeh (PSMS Medan)

2 goals

- Dicky Firasat (Arema Indonesia)
- Sunarto (Arema Indonesia)
- (Indonesia) Ahmad Maulana Putra (Deltras)
- (Liberia) Amos Marah (Deltras)
- (Indonesia) Budi Sudarsono (Deltras)
- (Indonesia) Anindito Wahyu Erminarno (Mitra Kukar)
- (Cameroon) Gustave Bahoken (Mitra Kukar)
- (Cameroon) Pierre Njanka (Mitra Kukar/Persisam Putra Samarinda)
- (Bulgaria) Stanislav Zhekov (Pelita Jaya)
- (Indonesia) Irsyad Aras (Persela Lamongan)
- (South Korea) Park Chul-Hyung (Persela Lamongan)
- (Indonesia) Taufiq Kasrun (Persela Lamongan)
- (Indonesia) Zaenal Arifin (Persela Lamongan)
- (Indonesia) Aliyudin Ali (Persib Bandung)
- (Uruguay) Esteban Guillén (Persiba Balikpapan)
- (Indonesia) Christian Warobay (Persidafon Dafonsoro)
- (Cameroon) Eric Bayemi (Persidafon Dafonsoro)
- (Indonesia) Izak Ogoai (Persidafon Dafonsoro)
- (Indonesia) Gideon V. Way (Persiram Raja Ampat)
- (Indonesia) Nasution Karubaba (Persiram Raja Ampat)
- (Japan) Tomoyuki Sakai (Persiram Raja Ampat)
- (Indonesia) Yan D. Ruatakurey (Persiram Raja Ampat)
- (Indonesia) Johan Yoga Utama (Persisam Putra Samarinda)
- (Indonesia) Firly Apriansyah (Persiwa Wamena)
- (Japan) Yuichi Shibakoya (Persiwa Wamena)
- (Indonesia) Abdul Faisal (PSAP Sigli)
- (South Korea) Lee Soung Yong (PSAP Sigli)
- (Indonesia) Sukman Suaib (PSAP Sigli)
- (Indonesia) Arie Supriyatna (PSMS Medan)
- (Indonesia) Denny Rumba (PSMS Medan)
- (Serbia) Saša Zečević (PSMS Medan)
- (Indonesia) Agus Cima (PSPS Pekanbaru)
- (Indonesia) Michael Orah (PSPS Pekanbaru)
- (Indonesia) Achmad Jufriyanto (Sriwijaya)
- (Indonesia) Nova Arianto (Sriwijaya)
- (Indonesia) Riski Novriansyah (Sriwijaya)

1 goal

- Agung Suprayogi (Arema Indonesia)
- Dendi Santoso (Arema Indonesia)
- Firmansyah Aprillianto (Arema Indonesia)
- Johan Ahmad Farizi (Arema Indonesia)
- Kusnul Yuli (Arema Indonesia)
- (Indonesia) Juan Revi (Deltras)
- (Croatia) Mijo Dadić (Deltras)
- (South Korea) Shin Hyun-Joon (Deltras)
- (Indonesia) Supandi (Deltras)
- (Argentina) Walter Brizuela (Deltras)
- (Indonesia) David Faristian (Gresik United)
- (Indonesia) Ponsianus Mayona Amtop (Gresik United)
- (Indonesia) Rahmat Rivai (Gresik United)
- (Indonesia) Rudianto (Gresik United)
- (Indonesia) Arif Suyono (Mitra Kukar)
- (Indonesia) Fadil Sausu (Mitra Kukar)
- (Indonesia) Isnan Ali (Mitra Kukar)
- (Japan) Seiji Kaneko (Mitra Kukar)
- (Indonesia) Victor Simon Badawi (Mitra Kukar)
- (Indonesia) Engelbert Sani (Pelita Jaya)
- (Indonesia) Aris Alfiansyah (Persela Lamongan)
- (Indonesia) Dedi Indra (Persela Lamongan)
- (Indonesia) Fathlul Rahman (Persela Lamongan)
- (South Korea) Oh In-Kyun (Persela Lamongan)
- (Indonesia) Rudi Widodo (Persela Lamongan)
- (Cameroon) Abanda Herman (Persib Bandung)
- (Indonesia) Budiawan (Persib Bandung)
- (Indonesia) Eki Nurhakim (Persiba Balikpapan)
- (Indonesia) Supriyadi (Persiba Balikpapan)
- (Indonesia) Syaiful Lewenussa (Persiba Balikpapan)
- (Croatia) Tomislav Labudović (Persiba Balikpapan)
- (Indonesia) Alan Aronggear (Persidafon Dafonsoro)
- (Indonesia) Andri Ibo (Persidafon Dafonsoro)
- (Indonesia) Izaac Wanggai (Persidafon Dafonsoro)
- (Indonesia) Mitchell Nere (Persidafon Dafonsoro)
- (Indonesia) Zico Rumkabu (Persidafon Dafonsoro)
- (Indonesia) Ismed Sofyan (Persija Jakarta)
- (Indonesia) Johan Juansyah (Persija Jakarta)
- (Indonesia) Octavianus (Persija Jakarta)
- (Singapore) Precious Emuejeraye (Persija Jakarta)
- (Indonesia) David Laly (Persipura Jayapura)
- (Indonesia) Gerald Pangkali (Persipura Jayapura)
- (Indonesia) Imanuel Wanggai (Persipura Jayapura)
- (Indonesia) Yohanis Tjoe (Persipura Jayapura)
- (Indonesia) Kubay Quaiyan (Persiram Raja Ampat)
- (Indonesia) Marthen Tao (Persiram Raja Ampat)
- (Indonesia) Nehemia Solossa (Persiram Raja Ampat)
- (Indonesia) Steven Hendambo (Persiram Raja Ampat)
- (Indonesia) Fajar Legian Siswanto (Persisam Putra Samarinda)
- (South Korea) Kim Dong-Chan (Persisam Putra Samarinda)
- (Cameroon) Luc Zoa (Persisam Putra Samarinda)
- (Indonesia) Fred Mote (Persiwa Wamena)
- (Indonesia) Galih Firmansyah (Persiwa Wamena)
- (Indonesia) Ricardo Merani (Persiwa Wamena)
- (Indonesia) Yesaya Desnam (Persiwa Wamena)
- (Indonesia) Feri Komul (PSAP Sigli)
- (Indonesia) Heri Saputra (PSAP Sigli)
- (South Africa) Mfundo Cecil (PSAP Sigli)
- (Indonesia) Reza Fandi (PSAP Sigli)
- (Indonesia) Alamsyah Nasution (PSMS Medan)
- (Indonesia) Novi Handriawan (PSMS Medan)
- (Indonesia) Ade Suhendra (PSPS Pekanbaru)
- (Indonesia) M. Zahrul Azhar (PSPS Pekanbaru)
- (Indonesia) Ponaryo Astaman (Sriwijaya)
- (Indonesia) Supardi Nasir (Sriwijaya)

== Own goal ==
1 goal

- (Indonesia) Dedi Gusmawan (PSPS Pekanbaru) (for Persela Lamongan)
- (Indonesia) Hamka Hamzah (Mitra Kukar) (for Persisam Putra Samarinda)
- (Indonesia) Jajang Sukmara (Persib Bandung) (for Persipura Jayapura)
- (Liberia) Kubay Quaiyan (Persiram Raja Ampat) (for Persib Bandung)
- (Cameroon) Luc Zoa (Persisam Putra Samarinda) (for Deltras)
- (Singapore) Precious Emuejeraye (Persija Jakarta) (for Arema Indonesia)
- Rahmad (PSMS Medan) (for Arema Indonesia)
