= 2011 Indonesia Promotion/Relegation play-off =

- Event: 2011 Indonesia Super League play-off
Bontang FC	Persidafon Jayapura
(Indonesia)	(Indonesia)
2	3
- Date: 23 June 2011
- Venue: Kanjuruhan Stadium, Malang, East Java
- ISL Play-off Man of the Match: Eduard Ivakdalam (Persidafon)
- Referee: Iis Isya Permana (Indonesia)
- Attendance: 1,535
- Weather: Sunny

The 2011 Indonesia Super League play-off was a football match which was played on Thursday, 23 June 2011, played between Bontang FC (from Bontang), who were ranked 15th in the 2010-11 Indonesia Super League and Persidafon (from Jayapura), ranked 4th.

Persidafon gained promotion to the Indonesia Super League 2011-12 season after beating Bontang FC by a score of 3-2.

== Match details ==
23 June 2011
15:35 WIB

Bontang FC	2 – 3	Persidafon Jayapura
Kenji 12'; Itfar 65'	Report	48' Lukas; 56' (pen.) Cirelli; 66' P. Wanggai

Kanjuruhan Stadium, Malang, East Java
Attendance: 1,535
Referee: Iis Isya Permana (Indonesia)

Bontang FC	Persidafon Jayapura

Bontang FC: 4-3-3
GK	30	(Indonesia) Tirtah Bahyu Kencana
CB	6	(Indonesia) Handi Hamzah
CB	21	(Cameroon) Nyeck Nyobe	(yellow card) 92'
LB	11	(Indonesia) Arbadin	(yellow card) 92'
RB	7	(Indonesia) Arifki Eka Putra	(yellow card) 55'	(substituted off) 72'
DM	12	(Indonesia) Usman	(yellow card) 38'	(substituted off) 75'
DM	45	(Indonesia) Marchelino Mandagi		(substituted off) 32'
AM	8	(Togo) Ali Khadaffi (c)
LW	9	(Philippines) Satoshi Otomo
RW	17	(Cameroon) Émile Mbamba	(yellow card) 68'
ST	10	(Japan) Kenji Adachihara
Substitutes
GK	86	(Indonesia) Eddy Kurnia
DF	3	(Indonesia) Abdul Rahman
MF	14	(Indonesia) Fadil Sausu		(substituted on) 75'
DF	20	(Indonesia) Joko Sidiq
MF	22	(Indonesia) Sardianata
FW	29	(Indonesia) Mohammad Istigfar		(substituted on) 32'
FW	99	(Indonesia) Dani Marfelous Damangge		(substituted on) 72'
Head coach
(Indonesia)

Persidafon Jayapura: 3-6-1
GK	82	(Indonesia) I Putu Dian Ananta
CB	17	(Indonesia) Edison Ames	(yellow card) 30'	(substituted off) 60'
CB	21	(Indonesia) Victor Pae
CB	29	(Argentina) Marcelo Cirelli
LWB	18	(Indonesia) Rasmoyo
RWB	5	(Indonesia) Christian Warobay
DM	28	(Indonesia) Andri Ibo	(yellow card) 88'
CM	27	(Indonesia) Izaac Wanggai
AM	10	(Indonesia) Eduard Ivakdalam (c)		(substituted off) 80'
AM	19	(Liberia) Abiel Cielo	(yellow card) 89'
ST	33	(Indonesia) Lukas Rumkabu	(yellow card) 73'	(substituted off) 93'
Substitutes
GK	85	(Indonesia) Selsius Gebze
MF	8	(Indonesia) Angga Pratama
DF	12	(Indonesia) Harianto		(substituted on) 80'
DF	14	(Indonesia) Frangky Amo
MF	24	(Indonesia) Yohanis Makanway
FW	88	(Indonesia) Patrick Wanggai		(substituted on) 60'
FW	99	(Nigeria) Ernest Jeremiah		(substituted on) 93'
Head coach
(Indonesia) Agus Yuwono

ISL Play-off Man of the Match:
(Indonesia) Eduard Ivakdalam (Persidafon Jayapura)

== See also ==
- 2010–11 Liga Indonesia Premier Division
- 2010–11 Indonesia Super League
