= 2009 Liga Indonesia Premier Division final =

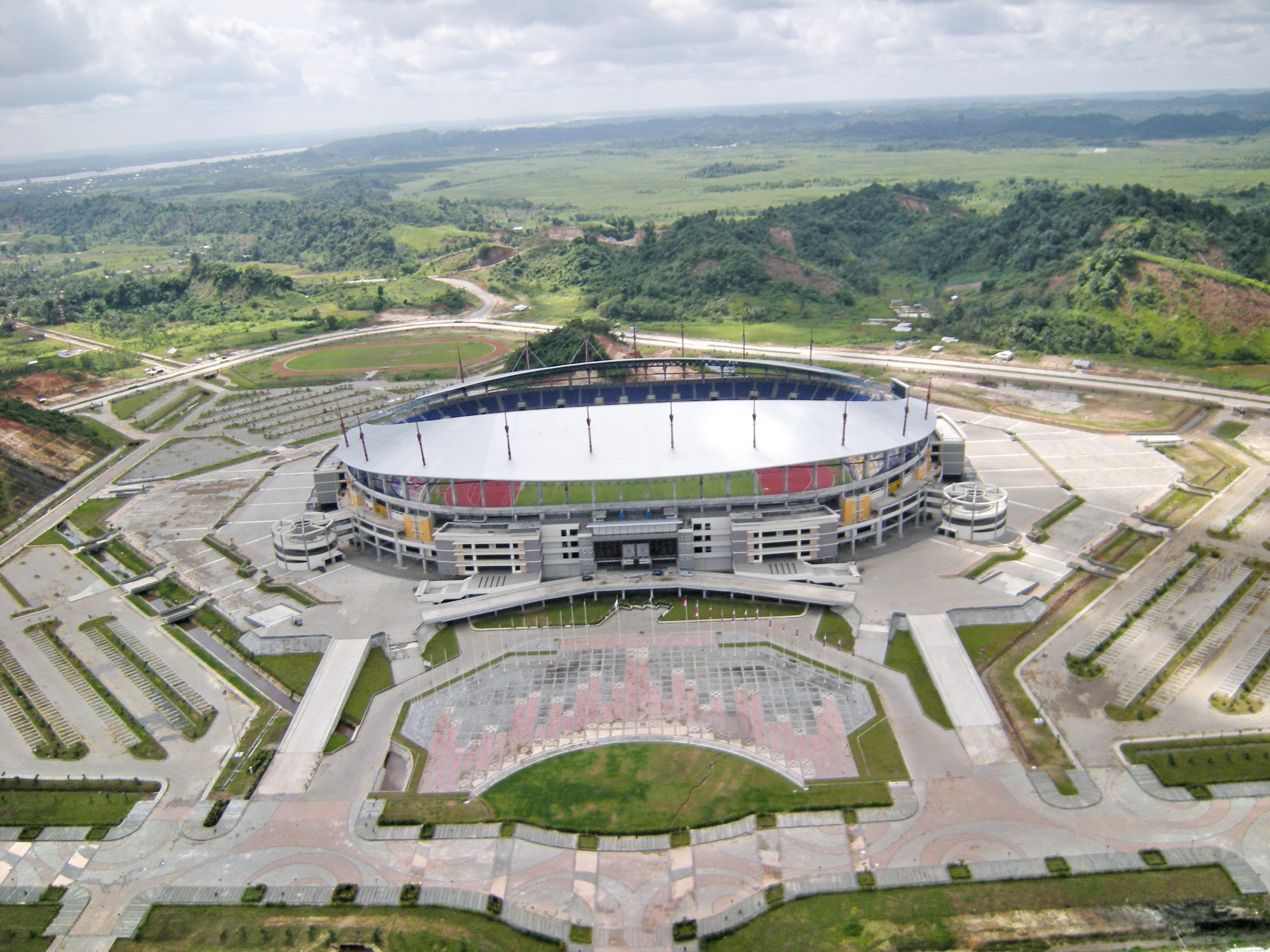
- Event: 2008–09 Liga Indonesia Premier Division
Persisam Putra Samarinda	Persema Malang
(Indonesia)	(Indonesia)
1	0
- Date: 29 May 2009
- Venue: Palaran Stadium, Samarinda
- Liga Esia Man of the Match: Aldo Baretto (Persisam)
- Referee: Suharto (Indonesia)
- Attendance: 10,000
- Weather: Fine

The 2009 Liga Indonesia Premier Division final was a football match which was played on 29 May 2009. Persisam and Persema was a debutant of the final stage.

== Road to Samarinda ==
Persisam Samarinda			Round	Persema Malang		
Main article: 2008–09 Liga Indonesia Premier Division first group stage: Group I: Team / Pld / W / D / L / GF / GA / GD / Pts; Persisam Putra Samarinda / 28 / 17 / 7 / 4 / 52 / 24 / +28 / 58; PSPS Pekanbaru / 28 / 17 / 5 / 6 / 47 / 25 / +22 / 56; Mitra Kukar / 28 / 17 / 1 / 10 / 38 / 28 / +10 / 52; Persikabo Bogor / 28 / 13 / 10 / 5 / 44 / 27 / +17 / 49; Persikab Bandung Regency / 28 / 14 / 6 / 8 / 46 / 34 / +12 / 48; Persiraja Banda Aceh / 28 / 12 / 5 / 11 / 30 / 32 / −2 / 41; Semen Padang / 28 / 10 / 10 / 8 / 42 / 30 / +12 / 40; Persih Tembilahan / 28 / 10 / 7 / 11 / 39 / 35 / +4 / 37; PSDS Deli Serdang / 28 / 10 / 4 / 14 / 27 / 34 / −7 / 34; Persikad Depok / 28 / 10 / 6 / 12 / 33 / 42 / −9 / 33; PSAP Sigli / 28 / 10 / 3 / 15 / 28 / 47 / −19 / 33; PSSB Bireuen / 28 / 7 / 6 / 15 / 23 / 34 / −11 / 27; Persikota Tangerang / 28 / 7 / 6 / 15 / 29 / 52 / −23 / 27; Persibat Batang / 28 / 8 / 2 / 18 / 25 / 44 / −19 / 26; PSP Padang / 28 / 6 / 6 / 16 / 24 / 39 / −15 / 24			First Group stage	Main article: 2008–09 Liga Indonesia Premier Division first group stage: Group II: Team / Pld / W / D / L / GF / GA / GD / Pts; Persema Malang / 26 / 19 / 1 / 6 / 52 / 26 / +26 / 58; Persebaya Surabaya / 26 / 18 / 1 / 7 / 44 / 19 / +25 / 55; Persiba Bantul / 26 / 15 / 4 / 7 / 32 / 21 / +11 / 49; Persigo Gorontalo / 26 / 15 / 1 / 10 / 38 / 27 / +11 / 46; Persibom Bolaang Mongondow / 26 / 14 / 1 / 11 / 33 / 26 / +7 / 43; Persibo Bojonegoro / 26 / 12 / 5 / 9 / 35 / 31 / +4 / 41; Perseman Manokwari / 26 / 12 / 3 / 11 / 31 / 28 / +3 / 39; PSIR Rembang / 26 / 8 / 7 / 11 / 20 / 31 / −11 / 31; Gresik United / 26 / 9 / 3 / 14 / 31 / 36 / −5 / 30; PSS Sleman / 26 / 9 / 6 / 11 / 31 / 38 / −7 / 30; Persis Solo / 26 / 7 / 5 / 14 / 17 / 28 / −11 / 25; PSIM Yogyakarta / 26 / 7 / 4 / 15 / 20 / 36 / −16 / 25; Persiku Kudus / 26 / 7 / 4 / 15 / 19 / 40 / −21 / 25; Persekabpas Pasuruan / 26 / 5 / 5 / 16 / 22 / 38 / −16 / 17		
Main article: 2008–09 Liga Indonesia Premier Division second group stage: Group 2: Team / Pld / W / D / L / GF / GA / GD / Pts; Persisam Putra Samarinda / 3 / 2 / 1 / 0 / 10 / 2 / +8 / 7; Persebaya Surabaya / 3 / 1 / 1 / 1 / 2 / 2 / 0 / 4; Mitra Kukar / 3 / 1 / 1 / 1 / 4 / 7 / -3 / 4; Persigo Gorontalo / 3 / 0 / 1 / 2 / 4 / 9 / -5 / 1			Second Group stage	Main article: 2008–09 Liga Indonesia Premier Division second group stage: Group 1: Team / Pld / W / D / L / GF / GA / GD / Pts; Persema Malang / 3 / 2 / 1 / 0 / 4 / 1 / +3 / 7; PSPS Pekanbaru / 3 / 1 / 2 / 0 / 5 / 3 / +2 / 5; Persiba Bantul / 3 / 1 / 0 / 2 / 3 / 5 / -2 / 3; Persikabo Bogor / 3 / 0 / 1 / 2 / 2 / 5 / -3 / 1		
Opponent	Result	Legs	Knockout stage	Opponent	Result	Legs
PSPS Pekanbaru	3-1	One-leg match played	Semifinals	Persebaya Surabaya	3–1	One-leg match played

== Match details ==
29 May 2009
19:00 (WITA)

Persisam Putra Samarinda	1 – 0	Persema Malang
Aldo Baretto 35'	Report

Palaran Stadium, Samarinda
Attendance: 10,000
Referee: Suharto (Indonesia)

Persisam Putra Samarinda	Persema Malang

Persisam Putra Samarinda: 5-3-2
GK	36	(Indonesia) Sumardi
DF	2	(Chile) Pato Jimenez
DF	3	(Indonesia) Syaiful Lewenussa	(yellow card) 21'
DF	4	(Indonesia) Kasiadi
DF	15	(Indonesia) Marchelino Mandagi
DF	82	(Indonesia) Rasmoyo	(yellow card) 25'
MF	8	(Brazil) Jardel Santana	(substituted off) 47'
MF	9	(Indonesia) Uston Nawawi	(substituted off) 78'
MF	13	(Indonesia) Akbar Rasyid (c)
FW	12	(Paraguay) Aldo Baretto
FW	28	(Indonesia) Ilham Jaya Kesuma	(substituted off) 85'
Substitutes
FW	11	(Indonesia) Muhammad Fakhrudin
FW	17	(Indonesia) Gantarkhan	(substituted on) 85'
FW	18	(Indonesia) Nasution Karubaba
GK	30	(Indonesia) Ngadiono
MF	31	(Indonesia) Tommy Pranata
DF	77	(Indonesia) Victor Simon	(substituted on) 78'
MF	88	(Argentina) Gustavo Ortiz	(substituted on) 47'
Manager
(Indonesia) Aidil Fitri

Persema Malang: 3-5-2
GK	12	(Indonesia) I Komang Adnyana
DF	3	(Cameroon) Seme Patrick	(yellow card) 54'
DF	5	(Indonesia) Munhar
DF	18	(Indonesia) Aris Budi	(yellow card) 14'
MF	10	(Cameroon) Mbom Mbom Julien
MF	11	(Indonesia) Bima Sakti (c)
MF	19	(Indonesia) Kasan Soleh
MF	26	(Indonesia) M. Kamri	(yellow card) 65'
MF	27	(Indonesia) Sutaji	(yellow card) 78'
FW	25	(Sierra Leone) Brima Pepito
FW	99	(Indonesia) Harmoko	(substituted off) 46'
Substitutes
GK	1	(Indonesia) Sukasto Efendi
MF	8	(Indonesia) Abdi Gusti
FW	9	(Liberia) Davis Otto Weah
FW	15	(Indonesia) Jaya Teguh Angga
DF	21	(Indonesia) Hary Syaputra
DF	28	(Indonesia) Kusaeri
FW	29	(Indonesia) Jaenal Ichwan	(substituted on) 46'
Manager
(Indonesia) Hadi Santoso

Liga Esia Man of the Match:
(Paraguay) Aldo Baretto

== See also ==
- 2008–09 Liga Indonesia Premier Division
