= 2008–09 Persib Bandung season =

Indonesian football club season

Persib Bandung
2008–09 season
- President: Dada Rosada
- Head coach: Jaya Hartono
- Stadium: Si Jalak Harupat Stadium; Siliwangi Stadium
- Indonesia Super League: 3rd
- Copa Indonesia: Third round
- Top goalscorer: League: Hilton Moreira (15); All: Hilton Moreira (18)
- Highest home attendance: 30,000 vs Persijap Jepara (30 October 2008, Indonesia Super League); 30,000 vs Deltras Sidoarjo (23 May 2009, Indonesia Soccer Championship)
- Lowest home attendance: 0 vs Persik Kediri (5 August 2008, Indonesia Soccer Championship); 0 vs Persitara North Jakarta (16 August 2008, Indonesia Soccer Championship)
- Average home league attendance: 20,346
Home colours	Away colours

The 2008–09 season was the 50th season in the history of Persib Bandung, and the club's 14th consecutive season in the top-flight of Indonesian football since it became fully professional. It was the club's first season competing in the Indonesia Super League which replaced Liga Indonesia Premier Division as the top-flight of Indonesian football. In addition to the domestic league, Persib also participated in the Copa Indonesia.

The club finished third in the league on 66 points while also reaching the third round of Copa Indonesia before being eliminated by eventual winners Sriwijaya.

== Players ==
=== Squad information ===
No.	Name	Nat.	Date of Birth (Age)	Signed in	Contract until	Signed from	Transfer Fee	Notes
Goalkeepers
1	Edi Kurnia	(Indonesia)	2 October 1983 (age 43)	2006	2009	(Indonesia) Persikad Depok	?	
20	Cecep Supriatna	(Indonesia)	6 November 1975 (age 50)	2003	2014	(Indonesia) Persijatim Solo FC	?	
28	Tema Mursadat	(Indonesia)	7 March 1978 (age 48)	2007	2010	(Indonesia) Persita Tangerang	?	
Defenders
2	Edi Hafid	(Indonesia)	21 March 1983 (age 43)	2005	2010	(Indonesia) Persitara North Jakarta	?	
4	Wildansyah	(Indonesia)	3 January 1987 (age 39)	2008	2012	(Indonesia) Persib Bandung U-21	?	
5	Maman Abdurrahman	(Indonesia)	12 May 1982 (age 44)	2008	2013	(Indonesia) PSIS Semarang	?	
14	Nyeck Nyobe	(Cameroon)	18 March 1983 (age 43)	2007	2008	-	?	
21	Waluyo	(Indonesia)	30 September 1983 (age 43)	2008	2009	(Indonesia) Deltras Sidoarjo	?	
30	Nova Arianto	(Indonesia)	4 November 1978 (age 47)	2007	2011	(Indonesia) Persebaya Surabaya	?	
Midfielders
3	Irwan Wijasmara	(Indonesia)	11 June 1987 (age 39)	2008	2010	(Indonesia) Persib Bandung U-21	?	
7	Atep Rizal	(Indonesia)	5 June 1985 (age 41)	2008	2018	(Indonesia) Persija Jakarta	?	
8	Salim Alaydrus	(Indonesia)	17 February 1977 (age 49)	2006	2009	(Indonesia) Persikota Tangerang	?	
11	Lorenzo Cabanas	(Paraguay)	10 August 1979 (age 47)	2007	2009	(Indonesia) Persiba Balikpapan	?	
12	Gilang Angga	(Indonesia)	13 September 1980 (age 46)	2002	2011	(Indonesia) Persikab Bandung	?	
17	Harri Salisburi	(Indonesia)	15 April 1977 (age 49)	2008	2009	(Indonesia) PSIS Semarang	?	
19	Suwita Pata	(Indonesia)	25 March 1974 (age 52)	2005	2009	(Indonesia) PSIS Semarang	?	
22	Siswanto	(Indonesia)	9 October 1984 (age 42)	2008	2009	(Indonesia) Persmin Minahasa	?	
24	Hariono	(Indonesia)	2 October 1985 (age 41)	2008	2018	(Indonesia) Deltras Sidoarjo	?	
27	Chandra Yusuf Ahmad	(Indonesia)	27 August 1986 (age 40)	2008	2010	(Indonesia) Persib Bandung U-21	?	
88	Eka Ramdani	(Indonesia)	18 June 1984 (age 42)	2005	2011	(Indonesia) Persijatim East Jakarta	?	
Forwards
9	Airlangga Sucipto	(Indonesia)	22 November 1985 (age 40)	2008	2013	(Indonesia) Deltras Sidoarjo	?	
10	Hilton Moreira	(Brazil)	27 February 1981 (age 45)	2008	2010	(Indonesia) Deltras Sidoarjo	?	
15	Zaenal Arief	(Indonesia)	3 January 1981 (age 45)	2006	2009	(Indonesia) Persita Tangerang	?	
16	Rafael Bastos	(Brazil)	17 April 1982 (age 44)	2008	2009	(Brazil) America RJ	?	
18	Fábio Lopes	(Brazil)	30 August 1975 (age 51)	2008	2009	(Hong Kong) Eastern	?	
99	Cristian Gonzáles	(Uruguay)	30 August 1975 (age 51)	2009	2011	(Indonesia) Persik Kediri	?	

== Pre-season and friendlies ==
9 May 2008 Friendly	Persib	6–0	Saint Prima	Bandung, Indonesia
-	Nyeck; Jairon 48'; Jajang (o.g.); Airlangga; Irwan; Hilton			Stadium: Siliwangi; Attendance: ??? Referee: ???

14 May 2008 Friendly	Persib	5–0	PS UNI	Bandung, Indonesia
	Jairon; Hilton; Atep; Airlangga			Stadium: Siliwangi; Attendance: ???

3 June 2008 Friendly	Persib	11–0	007 FC	Bandung, Indonesia
	Arief 13' 50' 66' 84' 120'; Hilton 47' (pen.) 48'; Cabanas 62' 88' 109' (pen.); Airlangga 80'			Stadium: Siliwangi; Attendance: ???

3 June 2008 Friendly	Persib	1–0	Sriwijaya	Bandung, Indonesia
15:30 WIB	Hilton 42'			Stadium: Siliwangi; Attendance: ???

11 June 2008 Friendly	Persib	6–0	Persib U18	Bandung, Indonesia
	Arief 5'; Hilton 28'; Airlangga 56'; Bastos 60' 62' 68'			Stadium: Siliwangi; Attendance: ???

2 July 2008 Friendly	Persib	0–2	Persikabo	Bandung, Indonesia
			Mauro 13'; Agung Widodo 18'	Stadium: Siliwangi; Attendance: ???

24 November 2008 Friendly	PS Sangojar	1–4	Persib	Garut Regency, Indonesia
	???		??? ??? ??? ???	Stadium: Ancol; Attendance: ???

4 December 208 Friendly	Pesik	0–3	Persib	Kuningan, Indonesia
			Lopes 18'; Atep 67'; Bastos	Stadium: Mashud Wisnusaputra; Attendance: ???

6 December 2008 Friendly	Persib	9–0	Palber	Bandung, Indonesia
	Bastos 6' 31'; Airlangga 17' 34'; Cabanas 20'; Atep 28' 40'; Arief 74'; Eka 83'			Stadium: Persib; Attendance: ???

25 January 2009 Friendly	Ciamis Selection	0–2	Persib	Ciamis, Indonesia
			Cabanas 11' 20'	Stadium: Galuh; Attendance: ???

1 February 2009 Friendly	Persib	7–0	Perkesit	Bandung, Indonesia
	Gonzales 4' 14' 25'; Arief; Bastos; Hilton			Stadium: Persib; Attendance: ???

14 March 2009 Friendly	Perkesit	0–2	Persib	Cianjur, Indonesia
			Arief 11'; Bastos 18'	Stadium: Badak Putih; Attendance: ???

== Competitions ==
=== Overall ===
Last updated:

=== Indonesia Super League ===
==== League table ====
Pos	Team	Pld	W	D	L	GF	GA	GD	Pts	Qualification or relegation
1	Persipura (C)	34	25	5	4	81	25	+56	80	Qualification for the AFC Champions League group stage
2	Persiwa	34	21	3	10	57	32	+25	66	Qualification for the AFC Cup group stage
3	Persib	34	20	6	8	63	40	+23	66	
4	Persik	34	16	7	11	53	46	+7	55	
5	Sriwijaya	34	15	9	10	60	45	+15	54	Qualification for the AFC Champions League qualifying play-off (Note: Sriwijaya qualified for the AFC Champions League as Copa Indonesia winners.)

Source: RSSSF
Rules for classification: 1) points; 2) goal difference; 3) number of goals scored.
(C) Champions

==== Results summary ====
Overall								Home						Away					
Pld	W	D	L	GF	GA	GD	Pts	W	D	L	GF	GA	GD	W	D	L	GF	GA	GD
34	20	6	8	63	40	+23	66	13	3	1	38	14	+24	7	3	7	25	26	−1

Last updated: 14 July 2016.
Source: Competitive matches

==== Results by round ====
Round	1	2	3	4	5	6	7	8	9	10	11	12	13	14	15	16	17	18	19	20	21	22	23	24	25	26	27	28	29	30	31	32	33	34
Ground	H	H	A	A	H	H	A	A	H	H	A	A	A	H	H	H	A	H	H	H	H	H	A	A	A	A	H	A	H	A	H	A	A	A
Result	W	L	L	L	W	W	L	D	W	W	W	D	W	D	W	W	D	D	D	W	W	W	W	W	L	W	W	L	W	W	W	L	L	W

Source: Competitive matches
A = Away; H = Home; W = Win; D = Draw; L = Loss

==== Score overview ====
Win Draw Loss

Opponents	Home score	Away score	Double?
Arema Malang	2–1	2–0	Yes
Deltras Sidoarjo	6–1	2–0	Yes
Pelita Jaya	1–0	1–2	No
Persela Lamongan	5–2	0–2	No
Persiba Balikpapan	2–1	0–0	No
Persija Jakarta	2–3	2–1	No
Persijap Jepara	0–0	3–2	No
Persik Kediri	3–1	1–2	No
Persipura Jayapura	1-1	0–1	No
Persita Tangerang	2–0	4–2	Yes
Persitara North Jakarta	2–0	1–4	No
Persiwa Wamena	2–0	1–3	No
PKT Bontang	2–1	2–1	Yes
PSIS Semarang	3–1	2–0	Yes
PSM Makassar	0–0	1–1	No
PSMS Medan	2–0	1–1	No
Sriwijaya FC	3-2	2–4	No

Note: Persib Bandung goals are listed first.

== Statistics ==
=== Goalscorers ===
Rank	No.	Pos	Nat	Player	Indonesia Super League	Copa Indonesia	Total
1	10	FW	(Brazil)	Hilton Moreira	15	3	18
2	99	FW	(Uruguay)	Cristian Gonzáles	14	0	14
3	16	FW	(Brazil)	Rafael Bastos	10	1	11
4	11	MF	(Paraguay)	Lorenzo Cabanas	7	1	8
5	88	MF	(Indonesia)	Eka Ramdani	3	1	4
6	9	FW	(Indonesia)	Airlangga Sucipto	3	2	5
7	15	FW	(Indonesia)	Zaenal Arief	2	0	2
8	14	DF	(Cameroon)	Nyeck Nyobe	2	1	3
9	30	FW	(Indonesia)	Nova Arianto	2	0	2
9	7	MF	(Indonesia)	Atep Rizal	2	0	2
9	8	MF	(Indonesia)	Salim Alaydrus	1	0	1
10	18	FW	(Brazil)	Fábio Lopes	1	0	1
10	12	MF	(Indonesia)	Gilang Angga	1	0	1
Own goals					0	0	0
Total					63	9	72

=== Clean sheets ===
Rank	No.	Pos	Nat	Player	Indonesia Super League	Copa Indonesia	Total
1	28	GK	(Indonesia)	Tema Mursadat	11	0	11
2	20	GK	(Indonesia)	Cecep Supriatna	0	1	1
2	1	GK	(Indonesia)	Edi Kurnia	0	1	1
Total					11	2	13
