= Arey =

Arey may refer to:

== People ==
- Arey or Aredius of Gap (575–605), Bishop of Gap
- Carter Arey (born 1989), American wheelchair basketball player
- Harriett Ellen Arey (1819–1901), American educator, author, editor, and publisher
- Jaelani Arey (born 1990), Indonesian football manager and former player

== Other uses ==
- Arey, Zabaykalsky Krai, Russia, a rural locality
- Arey (company), a Russian security, surveillance and aerospace manufacturer

== See also ==
- Arey Island, Alaska, United States
- Arey Lagoon, Alaska
- Arrey (disambiguation)
