= Arrey =

Arrey may refer to:

- Florence Rita Arrey (born 1948), Cameroonian judge, first female chief justice of the Court of the Appeal and former Supreme Court of Cameroon justice
- Arrey von Dommer (1828–1905), German music critic, librarian and music historian
- Arrey, New Mexico, United States, a census-designated place

== See also ==
- Arrey Formation, a local name for the Red House Formation, a geologic formation in New Mexico
- Arey (disambiguation)
