= Rumkabu =

Rumkabu is a Papuan surname. Notable people with the surname include:

- Lukas Rumkabu (born 1977), Indonesian professional footballer
- Zico Rumkabu (born 1989), Indonesian professional footballer
