= 2010–11 Indonesia Super League =

Indonesian Super League
- Season: 2010–11
- Dates: 26 September 2010 – 19 June 2011
- Champions: Persipura; 2nd ISL title 3rd Indonesian title
- Relegated: Bontang (via play-off); PSM; Persema; Persibo
- Champions League: Persipura
- AFC Cup: Arema Indonesia
- Matches: 210
- Goals: 612 (2.91 per match)
- Top goalscorer: Boaz Solossa (22 goals)
- Biggest home win: Arema Indonesia 8–0 Bontang (19 June 2011)
- Biggest away win: Pelita Jaya 0–5 Persipura (30 September 2010); Bontang 0–5 Arema Indonesia (2 October 2010)
- Highest scoring: Persipura 8–1 Bontang (20 October 2010); Persija 7–2 Persisam Putra (23 April 2011)
- Longest winning run: 8 matches Persipura (ended 25 January 2011)
- Longest unbeaten run: 14 matches Persipura (until end of season)
- Longest losing run: 6 matches Persijap (ended 22 March 2011)
- Highest attendance: 36,994; Arema Indonesia 1–0 Persipura (6 February 2011)
- Lowest attendance: 0 Persib 1–0 Pelita Jaya (6 February 2011); Persib 1–1 Semen Padang (9 February 2011); PSPS 0–3 Persiwa (11 April 2011)
- Total attendance: 2,331,654
- Average attendance: 11,103

The 2010–11 Indonesia Super League (also known as Djarum Indonesia Super League for sponsorship reasons) was the 3rd season of the Indonesia Super League, a fully professional football competition that replaced the Premier Division as the top-tier of football competition in the country. The competition began on 26 September 2010 and ended on 19 June 2011.

The league was won by Persipura, who finished with an eight-point lead over runners-up and 2009–10 champions Arema Indonesia.

== Teams ==
Persik, Persebaya and Persitara were relegated at the end of the 2009–10 season after finishing in the bottom three places of the table. They were replaced by the best three teams from the 2009–10 Liga Indonesia Premier Division, Persibo, Deltras Sidoarjo and Semen Padang.

Pelita Jaya retained their Super League spot after winning the relegation/promotion play-off against fourth-placed Premier Division sides Persiram by 4–2 on penalties; the score after 120 minutes was 0-0.

=== Stadia and locations ===
Club	City/Regency	Province	Stadium	Capacity
Arema Indonesia	Malang Regency	East Java	Kanjuruhan	35,000
Bontang	Bontang	East Kalimantan	Mulawarman	20,000
Deltras	Sidoarjo Regency	East Java	Gelora Delta	35,000
Pelita Jaya	Karawang Regency	West Java	Singaperbangsa	25,000
Persela	Lamongan	East Java	Surajaya	25,000
Persib	Bandung Regency; Bandung	West Java	Si Jalak Harupat; Siliwangi	40,000; 15,000
Persiba	Balikpapan	East Kalimantan	Persiba Stadium	12,500
Persija	Jakarta	DKI Jakarta	Gelora Bung Karno	88,306
Persijap	Jepara	Central Java	Gelora Bumi Kartini	25,000
Persipura	Jayapura	Papua	Mandala	30,000
Persisam Putra	Samarinda	East Kalimantan	Segiri	25,000
Persiwa	Jayawijaya Regency	Papua	Pendidikan	15,000
PSPS	Pekanbaru; Kuansing Regency	Riau	Kaharuddin Nasution; Sport Centre	25,000
Semen Padang	Padang	West Sumatra	Haji Agus Salim	28,000
Sriwijaya	Palembang	South Sumatera	Jakabaring	40,000

Locations of the teams in the 2010–11 Indonesia Super League

=== Personnel and kits ===
Note: Flags indicate national team as has been defined under FIFA eligibility rules. Players and Managers may hold more than one non-FIFA nationality.

Team	Coach^{1}	Captain	Kit manufacturer	Shirt sponsor
Arema Indonesia	(Czech Republic) Miroslav Janu	(Singapore) Noh Alam Shah	Lotto	Ijen Nirwana, Axis
Bontang	(Indonesia) Fachry Husaini	(Togo) Ali Khadaffi	Specs	
Deltras	(Indonesia) Mustaqim	(Brazil) Danilo Fernando	Lotto	Kahuripan Nirwana Village
Pelita Jaya	(Serbia) Misha Radovic	(Malaysia) Safee Sali	Lotto	Esia, Recapital
Persela	(Indonesia) Subangkit	(Brazil) Fabiano Beltrame	Reebok	So Nice
Persib	(Indonesia) Daniel Roekito	(Indonesia) Eka Ramdani	Joma	Daya Honda
Persiba	(Indonesia) Haryadi (caretaker)	(Croatia) Mijo Dadić	Reebok	Bankaltim
Persija	(Indonesia) Rahmad Darmawan	(Indonesia) Bambang Pamungkas	League	DJARUM ISL
Persijap	(Indonesia) Suimin Diharja	(Brazil) Evaldo Silva	Lotto	Bank Jateng
Persipura	(Brazil) Jacksen F. Tiago	(Indonesia) Boaz Solossa	Specs	Bosowa, Bank Papua
Persisam Putra	(Indonesia) Hendri Susilo	(Indonesia) Akbar Rasyid	Lotto	Bankaltim
Persiwa	(Indonesia) Suharno	(Liberia) Boakay Eddie Foday	Lotto	Bank Papua
PSPS	(Indonesia) Abdul Rahman Gurning	(Cameroon) Herman Dzumafo	Lotto	
Semen Padang	(Indonesia) Nil Maizar	(Indonesia) Elie Aiboy	Specs	Semen Padang
Sriwijaya	(Bulgaria) Ivan Kolev	(Saint Kitts and Nevis) Keith Gumbs	Specs	Bank Sumsel-Babel

- Nike produced a new match ball, named the T90 Tracer.

=== Managerial changes ===
Team	Outgoing manager	Manner of departure	Date of vacancy	Table	Incoming manager	Date of appointment	Table
Persib	(France) Darko Janacković	Contract terminated	20 September 2010	Pre-season	(Serbia) Jovo Cuckovic	24 September 2010	18th
Deltras	(Indonesia) Nus Yadera	Mutual Consent	20 September 2010	Pre-season	(Indonesia) Mustaqim	21 September 2010	
Persijap	(Portugal) Divaldo Alves	Resign	1 Oktober 2010	14th	(Indonesia) Anjar Widodo (caretaker)	2 Oktober 2010	17th
Persijap	(Indonesia) Anjar Widodo (caretaker)	End of caretaker spell	9 Oktober 2010	17th	(Indonesia) Suimin Diharja	12 Oktober 2010	
Pelita Jaya	(Indonesia) Djadjang Nurdjaman (caretaker)	Mutual Consent	6 November 2010	18th	(Serbia) Misha Radovic	7 November 2010	
Persib	(Serbia) Jovo Cuckovic	Contract terminated	20 November 2010	18th	(Indonesia) Daniel Roekito	3 December 2010	
Persiba	(Indonesia) Junaedi	Resigned	2 February 2011	12th	(Indonesia) Haryadi (caretaker)	3 February 2011	
Deltras	(Indonesia) Mustaqim	Dismissed	26 April 2011	14th	(Indonesia) Nus Yadera	1 May 2011	

== Foreign players ==
Club	Visa 1	Visa 2	Visa 3	Asian-Visa 1	Asian-Visa 2	Former Player(s)
Arema Indonesia	(Slovakia) Roman Chmelo	(Slovakia) Roman Golian	(Uruguay) Esteban Guillen	(Singapore) Noh Alam Shah	(Singapore) Muhammad Ridhuan	(Cameroon) Pierre Njanka
Bontang	(Togo) Ali Khaddafi	(Cameroon) Nyeck Nyobe	(Cameroon) Émile Mbamba	(Japan) Kenji Adachihara	(Philippines) Satoshi Otomo	(Croatia) Romeo Filipović (Cameroon) Julius Akosah
Pelita Jaya	(Paraguay) Juan Ramirez	(Scotland) Chris Doig	(Mali) Dramane Coulibaly	(Malaysia) Safee Sali	(Australia) Troy Hearfield	(Argentina) Walter Brizuela (Japan) Tomoyuki Sakai (Japan) Yuichi Shibakoya
Deltras	(Brazil) Danilo Fernando	(Brazil) Márcio Souza	(Brazil) Cristiano Lopes	(Australia) Steve Hesketh	(South Korea) Park Chan Young	None
Persela	(Brazil) Fabiano Beltrame	(Morocco) Redouane Barkaoui	(Argentina) Gustavo López	(South Korea) Kim Yong-Han	(Singapore) Fahrudin Mustafić	(South Korea) An Hyo-yeon
Persema						(Australia) Robert Gaspar (Cameroon) Herman Abanda (Cameroon) Guy Mamoun (Cameroon) Seme Pattrick
Persib	(Cameroon) Abanda Herman	(Montenegro) Miljan Radović	(Brazil) Hilton Moreira	(Japan) Shohei Matsunaga	None	(Argentina) Pablo Francés (Singapore) Baihakki Khaizan
Persiba	(Croatia) Mijo Dadic	(Paraguay) Aldo Barreto	(Argentina) Robertino Pugliara	(Syria) Muhammad Albicho	(Singapore) Khairul Amri	(Philippines) Jason de Jong (South Korea) Kim Yong-Hee
Persibo						(Brazil) Eduardo Bizzaro (Brazil) Wallacer (China) Li Zhixing (Ivory Coast) Eugène Dadi (South Korea) Kim Kang-hyun
Persija	(Cameroon) Eric Bayemi	(Nigeria) Greg Nwokolo	(Liberia) Oliver Makor	(Singapore) Agu Casmir	(Singapore) Precious Emuejeraye	(Cameroon) Julius Akosah
Persijap	(Brazil) Alberto Gonçalves	(Brazil) Evaldo Silva	(Argentina) Jose Sebastian	(South Korea) Yoon Sung Min	None	(Spain) Xavi Pérez (Portugal) Guti Ribeiro
Persipura	(Cameroon) Bio Paulin	(Nigeria) Victor Igbonefo	(Liberia) Zah Rahan	(South Korea) Yoo Jae-Hoon	None	None
Persisam Putra	(Chile) Julio Lopez	(Uruguay) Ronald Fagundez	(Cameroon) Joel Tsimi	(Uzbekistan) Pavel Solomin	(South Korea) Choi Dong-soo	None
Semen Padang	(Argentina) Esteban Vizcarra	(Cameroon) David Pagbe	(Liberia) Edward Junior Wilson	(South Korea) Yoo Hyun-Koo	(South Korea) Park Chul-Hyung	None
Persiwa	(Serbia) Sasa Zecevic	(Liberia) Boakay Foday	(Liberia) Erick Lewis	(Japan) Yuichi Shibakoya	(Japan) Sakai Tomoyuki	(China) Li Houyuan
PSM						(Australia) Goran Šubara (Australia) Srećko Mitrović (Cameroon) Basile Onambele (Nigeria) Anoure Obiora (Syria) Marwan Sayedeh
PSPS	(Cameroon) Banaken Bassoken	(Cameroon) Herman Dzumafo	(Cameroon) Patrice Nzekou	(South Korea) Shin Hyun Joon	None	(Australia) Josh Maguire
Sriwijaya	(Brazil) Diano (footballer)	(Cameroon) Thierry Gathuessi	(Saint Kitts and Nevis) Keith Gumbs	(South Korea) Kim Yong-Hee	(South Korea) Lim Joon-Sik	(Brazil) Júlio César (China) Mu Yongjie

== League table ==
Pos	Team	Pld	W	D	L	GF	GA	GD	Pts	Qualification
1	Persipura (C)	28	17	9	2	63	23	+40	60	Qualification for AFC Champions League qualifying play-off
2	Arema Indonesia	28	15	7	6	52	25	+27	52	Qualification for AFC Cup group stage (Note: Arema qualified for the AFC Cup as league runners-up since Piala Indonesia was not held in 2011.)
3	Persija	28	15	7	6	52	28	+24	52	
4	Semen Padang	28	12	12	4	41	27	+14	48	
5	Sriwijaya	28	13	7	8	43	32	+11	46	
6	Persisam Putra	28	13	3	12	39	45	−6	42	
7	Persib	28	11	6	11	44	43	+1	39	
8	Persiwa	28	10	8	10	43	50	−7	38	
9	Persela	28	10	7	11	30	31	−1	37	
10	Persiba	28	9	7	12	41	44	−3	34	
11	PSPS	28	10	3	15	38	47	−9	30 (Note: PSPS Pekanbaru were docked three points because they were unable to conduct their home match against Persiwa Wamena.)	
12	Pelita Jaya	28	8	5	15	31	36	−5	29	
13	Deltras	28	9	2	17	34	52	−18	29	
14	Persijap	28	7	7	14	28	50	−22	28	
15	Bontang (R)	28	3	6	19	33	79	−46	15	Qualification for relegation play-off
16	Persema	0	0	0	0	0	0	0	0 (Note: PSM Makassar, Persema Malang, and Persibo Bojonegoro withdrew from the Indonesia Super League and moved to Liga Primer Indonesia.)	Withdrew
17	Persibo	0	0	0	0	0	0	0	0	Withdrew
18	PSM	0	0	0	0	0	0	0	0	Withdrew

Source: Indonesia Super League Table
Rules for classification: 1) points; 2) goal difference; 3) number of goals scored.
(C) Champions; (R) Relegated

== Results ==
Home \ Away	ARE	BON	DEL	PEL	PSL	PSB	PBA	PSJ	PSJP	PPR	PPSA	PWA	RIA	SPD	SRI
Arema Indonesia		8–0	3–0	1–0	1–0	2–0	3–0	2–1	2–0	1–0	2–0	4–0	4–2	3–1	1–1
Bontang	0–5		2–1	1–2	2–0	0–1	3–5	1–3	1–1	1–1	0–1	3–3	0–1	1–1	2–3
Deltras	1–1	3–2		0–2	2–0	4–1	2–0	1–2	5–3	1–1	4–0	2–1	4–3	0–3	3–1
Pelita Jaya	1–0	1–0	3–0		2–2	1–2	1–1	0–1	2–0	0–5	0–1	4–0	2–3	2–2	1–0
Persela	0–0	4–1	1–0	1–1		1–1	1–0	0–0	1–0	0–1	4–1	5–1	3–0	1–0	1–0
Persib	1–1	3–0	4–0	1–0	2–1		5–1	2–3	4–1	2–2	4–1	5–2	0–1	1–1	1–0
Persiba	0–0	1–1	4–0	3–1	4–0	2–0		0–1	0–0	1–0	2–0	4–0	3–2	1–1	0–1
Persija	2–1	4–1	2–0	1–0	2–0	3–0	5–1		3–0	1–1	7–2	0–0	3–0	1–1	0–0
Persijap	2–3	2–1	2–1	1–0	0–2	1–1	1–1	4–1		1–3	1–0	3–2	1–0	1–1	1–1
Persipura	6–1	8–1	2–0	2–1	3–0	5–1	3–1	2–1	1–0		2–0	1–1	4–1	1–1	3–2
Persisam Putra	2–1	1–2	1–0	1–0	4–1	1–0	4–1	1–0	1–1	1–2		5–2	2–0	1–1	4–1
Persiwa	1–0	4–2	2–0	3–3	0–0	3–0	3–1	2–0	3–1	1–1	1–1		2–0	0–0	2–0
PSPS	1–1	6–2	1–0	1–0	2–1	1–0	2–2	2–2	5–0	1–2	0–1	0–3 (Note: The match between PSPS Pekanbaru and Persiwa Wamena was awarded to Persiwa by a score of 3–0 after PSPS were unable to conduct the match.)		2–1	0–1
Semen Padang	2–0	2–2	4–0	1–0	1–0	1–1	2–1	1–0	3–0	1–1	3–1	3–0	1–0		2–1
Sriwijaya	1–1	4–1	1–0	2–1	0–0	4–1	2–1	3–3	2–0	0–0	3–1	2–1	2–1	5–0	

Source: Schedules & Results at fifa.com, Schedules at liga-indonesia.co.id, Results at liga-indonesia.co.id
Legend: Blue = home team win; Yellow = draw; Red = away team win.

== Promotion/relegation play-off ==
23 June 2011
15:30 WIB

Bontang (R) Indonesia Super League	2–3	Persidafon (O) (P) Liga Indonesia Premier Division
Kenji 12'; Istigfar 65'	Report	Lukas 48'; Cirelli 56' (pen.); P. Wanggai 66'

Kanjuruhan Stadium, Malang Regency, East Java
Attendance: 1,546
Referee: Iis Isya Permana (Indonesia)

NB: (O) = Play-off winner; (P) = Promoted to Indonesia Super League; (R) = Relegated to Indonesian Premier Division.

== 2011 Indonesia Super League All-Star game ==
29 June 2011
17:00 WIT

Persipura Jayapura	2–1	ISL All-Star team
Zah Rahan 39', 83'	Report	M. Ridwan 30'

Mandala Stadium, Jayapura, Papua
Attendance: 34,895
Referee: Jimmy Napitupulu (Indonesia)

== Season statistics ==
=== Top goal scorers ===
Including matches played on 8 May 2011

Rank	Scorer	Club	Goals
1	(Indonesia) Boaz Solossa	Persipura	22
2	(Paraguay) Aldo Barreto	Persiba	16
2	(Liberia) Edward Wilson Junior	Semen Padang	16
4	(Japan) Kenji Adachihara	Bontang	15
5	(Brazil) Marcio Souza	Deltras	13
5	(Nigeria) Greg Nwokolo	Persija	13
5	(Liberia) Boakay Eddie Foday	Persiwa	13
5	(Chile) Julio Lopez	Persisam Putra	13
9	(Cameroon) Herman Dzumafo	PSPS	12
9	(Indonesia) Bambang Pamungkas	Persija	12
11	(Brazil) Cristiano Lopes	Deltras	11

=== Hat-tricks ===
Player	For	Against	Result	Date
(Liberia) Edward Wilson Junior	Semen Padang	Persiwa	3–0	30 September 2010
(Singapore) Noh Alam Shah	Arema Indonesia	Bontang	5–0	2 October 2010
(Indonesia) Boaz Solossa	Persipura	Arema Indonesia	6–1	7 March 2011
(Montenegro) Miljan Radovic	Persib	Persiwa	5–2	24 March 2011
(Liberia) Edward Wilson Junior	Semen Padang	Deltras	3–0	12 April 2011
(Singapore) Noh Alam Shah^{4}	Arema Indonesia	PSPS	4–2	15 April 2011
(Nigeria) Greg Nwokolo	Persija	Persisam Putra	7–2	23 April 2011
(Paraguay) Aldo Barreto	Persiba	Persela	4–0	24 April 2011
(Paraguay) Aldo Barreto	Persiba	Bontang	5–3	5 May 2011
(Indonesia) Yongki Aribowo	Arema Indonesia	Bontang	8–0	19 June 2011
(Liberia) Boakay Eddie Foday	Persiwa	Pelita Jaya	3–3	19 June 2011

- ^{4} : Player scored 4 goals

=== Scoring ===
- First goal of the season: Edward Wilson Junior for Semen Padang against Persipura Jayapura (26 September 2010)
- Quickest goal of the season: 43 seconds – Saktiawan Sinaga for Semen Padang against Persela Lamongan (8 January 2011)
- Widest winning margin: 8 goals
  - Arema Indonesia 8–0 Bontang (19 June 2011)
- Highest scoring game: 9 goals
  - Persipura Jayapura 8–1 Bontang (20 October 2010)
  - Persija Jakarta 7–2 Persisam Putra Samarinda (23 April 2011)
- Most goals scored in a match by a single team: 8 goals
  - Persipura Jayapura 8–1 Bontang (20 October 2010)
  - Arema Indonesia 8–0 Bontang (19 June 2011)
- Fewest games failed to score in: 3 – Persipura Jayapura
- Most games failed to score in: 12 – Deltras Sidoarjo

=== Clean sheets ===
- Most clean sheets: 13 – Arema FC
- Fewest clean sheets: 1 – Bontang FC

== Attendance ==
Pos	Team	Total	High	Low	Average	Change
1	Persipura	284,211	25,000	17,373	20,301	+47.7%
2	Arema Indonesia	283,009	36,994	9,258	20,215	−27.4%
3	Persija	268,262	35,000	5,000	19,162	−7.7%
4	Persib	237,269	26,876	0	16,948	−8.4%
5	Persisam Putra	167,183	14,672	6,584	11,942	+12.8%
6	Persiwa	163,183	15,000	4,750	11,656	+90.8%
7	PSPS	159,339	19,895	0	11,381	−31.9%
8	Sriwijaya	145,174	20,201	3,121	10,370	−11.5%
9	Semen Padang	124,373	15,400	2,804	8,884	n/a^{†}
10	Persela	115,081	15,000	10,000	8,220	+8.7%
11	Deltras	94,965	19,323	2,000	6,764	n/a^{†}
12	Persijap	91,798	9,800	3,000	6,557	−30.5%
13	Pelita Jaya	88,548	16,447	570	6,325	+36.6%
14	Persiba	62,903	6,730	3,762	4,493	−9.6%
15	Bontang	61,425	8,500	1,500	4,387	−36.9%
	League total	2,331,654	36,994	0	11,103	−1.9%

Updated to games played on 19 June 2011
Source: Indonesia Super League
Notes:
^{†} Team played previous season in Premier Division.

== See also ==
- 2011 Indonesia Super League All-Star Game
