= Nere =

Nere may refer to:

== People ==
- Mitchell Nere (born 1988), Indonesian footballer
- Nicolae Nere (born 1981), Romanian rugby union player
- Rully Nere (born 1957), Indonesian football coach

== Places ==
- Néré, a commune in the Charente-Maritime department, France
- Nere, Mulshi, a village in Maharashtra, India
- Lac Nère, a lake in Hautes-Pyrénées, France

== Other uses ==
- Nerë language
