= Ade Suhendra =

Ade Suhendra may refer to:

- Ade Suhendra (footballer, born 1983), Indonesian football midfielder
- Ade Suhendra (footballer, born 1987), Indonesian football defender
