= Indonesia Super League All-Star Game =

Indonesia Super League All-Star team
- Founded: 2009
- Region: Indonesia Super League (AFC)
- Teams: 2
- Most championships: Persipura Jayapura (2)
- Broadcaster: antv
- 2013 Indonesia Super League All-Star Game

Indonesia Super League All-Star Game (in Indonesian: ISL Perang Bintang) is the annual football All-star game in Indonesia, which is usually held during the half season break in Liga Indonesia Premier Division (1994–2008) or Indonesia Super League (2008–present). Since 1994 (when a full professional football league was established in Indonesia), there have been 3 All-star games (1994, 1995 and 2006). In these three games, the true all-star game model were used. Football fans will choose their favourite players to play in both participating teams.

However, starting from Perang Bintang 2010, the match will be held in the end of the season and a different players selection method were used. Instead of both teams, football fans can only vote players for one team (called ISL All-Star team). The other spot will be automatically taken by the Indonesia Super League champions. Obviously, the ISL All-star team will not be composed of any player from the league winning team.

Usually, season's best player, top scorer, and other awards will be inaugurated by the PSSI during this festival.

== Results ==
Year	Result	Host	Game MVP
2010	**ISL All-Star Team** 5 - 4 Arema FC	Kanjuruhan Stadium, Malang	
2011	ISL All-Star Team 1 - 2 **Persipura Jayapura**	Mandala Stadium, Jayapura	Zah Rahan Krangar, Persipura Jayapura
2012	ISL All-Star Team 1(3) - 1(4) (p) **Sriwijaya FC**	Jakabaring Stadium, Palembang	
2013	ISL All-Star Team 0 - 2 **Persipura Jayapura**	Mandala Stadium, Jayapura	
2014	ISL All-Star Team 1 - 8 (Italy) **Juventus FC**	Gelora Bung Karno Stadium, Jakarta	Fernando Llorente, Juventus FC

* Winners in bold

== See also ==
- Indonesia Super League
