= Aamo =

Aamo is a Norwegian surname. Notable people with the surname include:

- Bjørn Skogstad Aamo (1946–2023), Norwegian economist and politician
- Reidar Magnus Aamo (1898–1972), Norwegian politician

== See also ==
- Amo (surname)
