= Supriyadi (footballer) =

Indonesian footballer

Personal information
- Full name: Supriyadi
- Date of birth: 14 April 1985 (age 41)
- Place of birth: Jakarta, Indonesia
- Height: 1.77 m (5 ft 9 1/2 in)
- Positions: Left back; left winger

Senior career*
Years	Team	Apps	(Gls)
2005	Persiba Bantul		
2006	Persita Tangerang		
2006–2007	Persekabpas Pasuruan	25	(1)
2008–2009	Persita Tangerang	31	(1)
2009	Persisam Putra Samarinda	6	(0)
2010	Persitara North Jakarta	16	(0)
2010–2011	Persiwa Wamena	26	(1)
2011–2012	Persiba Balikpapan	27	(1)
2013–2014	Barito Putera	19	(0)
2015	Persiram Raja Ampat	1	(0)
2016	Persik Kediri	8	(0)
2017	PS Bengkulu	13	(1)

International career
2005	Indonesia U20		
- * Club domestic league appearances and goals as of 11 April 2017

Supriyadi (born 14 April 1985 in Jakarta) is an Indonesian former footballer who plays as a left back or left winger.

== Club statistics ==
Club	Season	Super League		Premier Division		Piala Indonesia		Total	
Club	Season	Apps	Goals	Apps	Goals	Apps	Goals	Apps	Goals
Persisam Putra	2009-10	6	0	-		0	0	6	0
Persitara North Jakarta	2009-10	16	0	-		1	0	17	0
Persiwa Wamena	2010-11	26	1	-		-		26	1
Persiba Balikpapan	2011-12	27	1	-		-		27	1
Total		75	2	-		1	0	76	2
