= 2012 Indonesia Super League All-Star team =

Indonesia Super League All-Star team
- Founded: 2009
- Region: Indonesia Super League (AFC)
- Teams: 1
- 2012 Indonesia Super League All-Star Game

In below is squad of Indonesia Super League All-Star who released on July 11, 2012.

== Staff ==
- Head coach : (Czech Republic) Miroslav Janu (Persela Lamongan)

== Players ==
No.	Pos.	Player	Date of birth (age)	Caps	Goals	Club
	GK	(Indonesia) Kurnia Meiga Hermansyah	May 7, 1990 (age 36)			(Football Association of Indonesia) Arema FC
	GK	(Indonesia) I Made Wirawan	December 1, 1981 (age 44)			(Football Association of Indonesia) Persiba Balikpapan
	DF	(Brazil) Fabiano Beltrame	August 29, 1982 (age 44)			(Football Association of Indonesia) Persija Jakarta
	DF	(Indonesia) Hamka Hamzah	January 29, 1984 (age 42)			(Football Association of Indonesia) Mitra Kukar FC
	DF	(Indonesia) Jajang Sukmara	November 18, 1988 (age 37)			(Football Association of Indonesia) Persib Bandung
	DF	(Indonesia) Ricardo Salampessy	February 18, 1984 (age 42)			(Football Association of Indonesia) Persipura Jayapura
	DF	(Indonesia) Supriyono	August 10, 1981 (age 45)			(Football Association of Indonesia) Persisam Putra Samarinda
	DF	(Indonesia) Victor Igbonefo	October 10, 1985 (age 40)			(Football Association of Indonesia) Pelita Jaya FC
	DF	(Indonesia) Zulkifli Syukur	May 3, 1984 (age 42)			(Football Association of Indonesia) Persib Bandung
	MF	(Argentina) Gustavo Lopez	June 28, 1983 (age 43)			(Football Association of Indonesia) Persela Lamongan
	MF	(Indonesia) Ahmad Bustomi	June 13, 1985 (age 41)			(Football Association of Indonesia) Mitra Kukar FC
	MF	(Indonesia) Atep	June 5, 1985 (age 41)			(Football Association of Indonesia) Persib Bandung
	MF	(Indonesia) Eka Ramdani	June 18, 1984 (age 42)			(Football Association of Indonesia) Persisam Putra Samarinda
	MF	(Liberia) Zah Rahan Krangar	March 7, 1985 (age 41)			(Football Association of Indonesia) Persipura Jayapura
	MF	(Singapore) Muhammad Ridhuan	May 6, 1984 (age 42)			(Football Association of Indonesia) Arema FC
	FW	(Argentina) Mario Costas	April 24, 1981 (age 45)			(Football Association of Indonesia) Persela Lamongan
	FW	(Brazil) Beto	December 31, 1980 (age 45)			(Football Association of Indonesia) Persipura Jayapura
	FW	(Indonesia) Bambang Pamungkas (Captain)	June 10, 1980 (age 46)			(Football Association of Indonesia) Persija Jakarta
	FW	(Malaysia) Safee Sali^{1}	January 28, 1984 (age 42)			(Football Association of Indonesia) Pelita Jaya FC
	FW	(Paraguay) Francisco Aldo Barreto	March 1, 1981 (age 45)			(Football Association of Indonesia) Persiba Balikpapan

^{1} Safee Sali was called into the national team so he did not play in the all star team.

== Line-Up ==
=== Starting 11 ===
No.	Pos.	Name
	GK	(Indonesia) Kurnia Meiga (substituted off)
	RB	(Indonesia) Zulkifli Syukur (substituted off)
	CB	(Indonesia) Hamka Hamzah (substituted off)
	CB	(Brazil) Fabiano Beltrame (C) (substituted off)
	LB	(Indonesia) Jajang Sukmara (substituted off)
	CM	(Argentina) Gustavo Lopez
	CM	(Indonesia) Ahmad Bustomi
	CM	(Liberia) Zah Rahan Krangar (substituted off)
	RW	(Indonesia) Bambang Pamungkas (substituted off)
	LW	(Brazil) Beto (substituted off)
	CF	(Paraguay) Aldo Barreto

=== Substitutions ===
No.	Pos.	Name
	GK	(Indonesia) I Made Wirawan (substituted on)
	DF	(Indonesia) Victor Igbonefo (substituted on)
	DF	(Indonesia) Ricardo Salampessy (substituted on)
	DF	(Indonesia) Supriyono (substituted on)
	MF	(Singapore) Muhammad Ridhuan (substituted on)
	MF	(Indonesia) Atep (substituted on)
	FW	(Argentina) Mario Costas (substituted on)
