= Arifki Eka Putra =

Indonesian footballer

Personal information
- Full name: Arifki Eka Putra Abdullah
- Date of birth: 19 February 1987 (age 39)
- Place of birth: Bengkulu, Indonesia
- Height: 1.73 m (5 ft 8 in)
- Positions: Full-back; winger

Youth career
- 2007–2008: PON East Kalimantan
- 2008: Bontang

Senior career*
Years	Team	Apps	(Gls)
2008–2011	Bontang	52	(1)
2011–2012	Persisam Putra	24	(0)
2013	Persela Lamongan	12	(0)
2013–2015	Persiba Balikpapan	27	(1)
2016	Mitra Kukar	7	(0)
2017	Celebest	12	(0)
2019	Badak Lampung	1	(0)
- * Club domestic league appearances and goals as of 11 July 2012

Arifki Eka Putra (born February 19, 1987) is an Indonesian former footballer.

== Club statistics ==
Club	Season	Super League		Premier Division		Piala Indonesia		Total	
Club	Season	Apps	Goals	Apps	Goals	Apps	Goals	Apps	Goals
Bontang FC	2009-10	20	0	-		3	0	23	0
Bontang FC	2009-10	28	1	-		3	0	31	1
Bontang FC	2010-11	24	0	-		-		24	0
Persisam Putra Samarinda	2011-12	24	0	-		-		24	0
Total		96	1	-		6	0	102	1
