= 2013 Indonesia Super League All-Star Game =

- Event: 2013 Indonesia Super League
Persipura Jayapura	ISL All-Star team
(Indonesia)	(Indonesia)
2	0
- details
- Date: 21 September 2013
- Venue: Mandala Stadium, Jayapura, Papua, Indonesia
- Referee: (Indonesia)
- Attendance: 24,352
- Weather: Sunny

2013 Indonesia Super League All-Star Game (in Indonesian: ISL Perang Bintang 2013) is the annual football All-star game in Indonesia, which was held shortly after the end of 2013 Indonesia Super League. This is the closing event for the Indonesia Super League's 2013 season.

For this year football fans can't vote for the players to be included in the ISL All-Star team, now the player choice by a team of Technical Study Group (TSG). The other spot will be automatically taken by the 2013 Indonesia Super League champions, Persipura Jayapura. Obviously, the ISL All-star team will not be composed of any player from Persipura.

The 2013 season's MVP award and top-scorer award (both given to Boaz Solossa), best goalkeeper award (to Yoo Jae-Hun), coach of the year award (to Jacksen F. Tiago), rookie of the year award (to Syakir Sulaiman) and the ISL Champions' trophy (to Persipura Jayapura) were awarded by PSSI (Indonesia's FA) during a ceremony after the All-Star game.

Persipura win after defeat the All-Star team 2-0.

== ISL All-Star Squad ==
The 2013 ISL All-Star squad was announced on September 13, 2013.

=== Staff ===
- Head coach : (Indonesia) Benny Dollo (Persija Jakarta)
- Assistant coach : (Indonesia) Joko Susilo (Arema FC)

=== Players ===
No.	Pos.	Player	Date of birth (age)	Caps	Goals	Club
1	GK	(Indonesia) Choirul Huda	June 2, 1979 (age 47)			(Football Association of Indonesia) Persela Lamongan
78	GK	(Indonesia) I Made Wirawan	December 1, 1981 (age 44)			(Football Association of Indonesia) Persib Bandung
3	DF	(Indonesia) Ahmad Sumardi	May 2, 1980 (age 46)			(Football Association of Indonesia) Persisam Putra Samarinda
13	DF	(Indonesia) Achmad Jufriyanto	February 7, 1987 (age 39)			(Football Association of Indonesia) Sriwijaya
14	DF	(Indonesia) Tony Sucipto	February 12, 1986 (age 40)			(Football Association of Indonesia) Persib Bandung
16	DF	(Indonesia) Muhammad Roby	September 12, 1985 (age 40)			(Football Association of Indonesia) Persisam Putra Samarinda
25	DF	(South Korea) Ha Dae-Won	April 28, 1985 (age 41)			(Football Association of Indonesia) Barito Putera
32	DF	(Indonesia) Victor Igbonefo	October 10, 1985 (age 40)			(Football Association of Indonesia) Arema FC
9	MF	(Indonesia) Zulham Zamrun	February 19, 1988 (age 38)			(Football Association of Indonesia) Mitra Kukar
11	MF	(Mali) Makan Konaté	November 10, 1991 (age 34)			(Football Association of Indonesia) Barito Putera
18	MF	(Japan) Shohei Matsunaga	January 7, 1989 (age 37)			(Football Association of Indonesia) Gresik United
19	MF	(Indonesia) Ahmad Bustomi	June 13, 1985 (age 41)			(Football Association of Indonesia) Mitra Kukar
20	MF	(Cameroon) Patrice Nzekou	June 22, 1983 (age 43)			(Football Association of Indonesia) Persiba Balikpapan
33	MF	(Ivory Coast) Lancine Koné	June 16, 1979 (age 47)			(Football Association of Indonesia) Persisam Putra Samarinda
7	FW	(Cameroon) Emmanuel Kenmogne	September 2, 1980 (age 45)			(Football Association of Indonesia) Persija Jakarta
8	FW	(Indonesia) Tantan	August 6, 1982 (age 43)			(Football Association of Indonesia) Sriwijaya
10	FW	(Indonesia) Sergio van Dijk	August 6, 1982 (age 43)			(Football Association of Indonesia) Persib Bandung
17	FW	(Indonesia) Ferdinand Sinaga	September 18, 1988 (age 37)			(Football Association of Indonesia) Persisam Putra Samarinda
21	FW	(Mali) Djibril Coulibaly	November 8, 1986 (age 39)			(Football Association of Indonesia) Barito Putera

Note:
1. All-star players composition changed by the coach after several players required by their respective clubs to go down in the International Tournament Menpora Cup.
2. List of players who were replaced: (Brazil) Beto, (Indonesia) Greg Nwokolo, (Cameroon) Thierry Gathuessi and (Indonesia) Hasyim Kipuw from Arema, (Indonesia) Supardi Nasir and (Indonesia) Muhammad Ridwan from Persib, (Timor-Leste) Diogo Santos Rangel from Gresik.

== ISL All-Star game ==
21 September 2013
17:30 WIT

Persipura Jayapura	2 – 0	ISL All-Star team
Boaz 80'; Gerald 85'	Report

Mandala Stadium, Jayapura, Papua
Attendance: 24,352

Persipura Jayapura: 4–2–3-1
GK	1	(South Korea) Yoo Jae-Hoon		(substituted off) 88'
CB	45	(Cameroon) Bio Paulin
CB	5	(Brazil) Otavio Dutra
LB	14	(Indonesia) Ruben Sanadi
RB	4	(Indonesia) Ricardo Salampessy		(substituted off) 89'
DM	8	(South Korea) Lim Joon-Sik	(yellow card) 41'
DM	11	(Indonesia) Imanuel Wanggai
LW	86	(Indonesia) Boaz Solossa (C)
AM	10	(Liberia) Zah Rahan Krangar		(substituted off) 89'
RW	15	(Indonesia) Gerald Pangkali		(substituted off) 89'
CF	88	(Indonesia) Patrich Wanggai		(substituted off) 69'
Substitutes
GK	20	(Indonesia) Ferdiansyah		(substituted on) 88'
DF	26	(Indonesia) Ortizan Solossa
DF	32	(Indonesia) Victor Pae
MF	12	(Indonesia) Nelson Alom		(substituted on) 89'
FW	17	(Indonesia) Yohanes Pahabol		(substituted on) 89'
FW	18	(Indonesia) Ricky Kayame		(substituted on) 69'
FW	21	(Indonesia) Yustinus Pae		(substituted on) 89'
FW	33	(Indonesia) Lukas Mandowen
Head coach
(Brazil) Jacksen F. Tiago

ISL All-Star team: 4-4-2
GK	78	(Indonesia) I Made Wirawan		(substituted off) 48'
CB	25	(South Korea) Ha Dae-Won
CB	32	(Indonesia) Victor Igbonefo	(yellow card) 21'
LB	14	(Indonesia) Tony Sucipto		(substituted off) 58'
RB	16	(Indonesia) Muhammad Roby (C)
LM	17	(Indonesia) Ferdinand Sinaga		(substituted off) 89'
CM	11	(Mali) Makan Konaté		(substituted off) 28'
CM	13	(Indonesia) Achmad Jufriyanto	(yellow card) 64'	(substituted off) 67'
RM	18	(Japan) Shohei Matsunaga		(substituted off) 89'
CF	7	(Cameroon) Emmanuel Kenmogne		(substituted off) 84'
CF	33	(Ivory Coast) Lancine Koné		(substituted off) 58'
Substitutes
GK	1	(Indonesia) Choirul Huda		(substituted on) 48'
DF	3	(Indonesia) Ahmad Sumardi		(substituted on) 58'
MF	9	(Indonesia) Zulham Zamrun		(substituted on) 89'
MF	19	(Indonesia) Ahmad Bustomi		(substituted on) 67'
MF	20	(Cameroon) Patrice Nzekou Nguenheu		(substituted on) 28'
FW	8	(Indonesia) Tantan		(substituted on) 89'
FW	10	(Indonesia) Sergio van Dijk		(substituted on) 58'
FW	21	(Mali) Djibril Coulibaly		(substituted on) 84'
Head coach
(Indonesia) Benny Dollo

Perang Bintang Man of the Match:

Assistant referees:
(Indonesia)
(Indonesia)

Reserve official:
(Indonesia)

== See also ==
- 2013 Indonesia Super League
