= Jovo Čučković =

Serbian football manager

Personal information
- Full name: Jovo Čučković
- Date of birth: 9 August 1952 (age 74)
- Place of birth: SR Serbia, SFR Yugoslavia

Managerial career
- Years: Team
- 1999: Obilić (caretaker)
- 2001–2004: Ozren Petrovo
- 2010–2011: Persib Bandung
- 2015: Hajduk Beograd
- 2018: Sloboda Užice (caretaker)
- 2019: Radnički Sremska Mitrovica

Jovo Čučković (born 9 August 1952) is a Serbian former football player and manager. He was a coach at Indonesian football club Persib Bandung in 2010.

He coached this after replacing the previous coach, Daniel Darko Janacković, who was fired before the 2010–11 Indonesia Super League competition began. Earlier he was positioned as an assistant coach at Persib Bandung, but due to lack of match between the players and coaches before he was appointed as head coach. He is considered close enough and willing to compromise with the players.
