= Edi Kurnia =

Indonesian footballer

Personal information
- Full name: Edi Kurnia
- Date of birth: 2 October 1983 (age 43)
- Place of birth: Bogor, Indonesia
- Height: 1.78 m (5 ft 10 in)
- Position: Goalkeeper

Senior career*
| Years | Team | Apps | (Gls) |
| 2002–2003 | PSB Bogor | 12 | (0) |
| 2003–2004 | Persikabo Bogor | 37 | (0) |
| 2004–2006 | Persikad Depok | 48 | (0) |
| 2006–2009 | Persib Bandung | 58 | (0) |
| 2009–2010 | Persikabo Bogor | 23 | (0) |
| 2010–2011 | Bontang FC | 24 | (0) |
| 2011–2012 | PSMS Medan | 22 | (0) |
| 2012–2013 | Pelita Bandung Raya | 28 | (0) |
| 2013 | Persikabo Bogor | 15 | (0) |
| 2014 | Perssu 1977 Sumenep | 17 | (0) |
| 2015 | Persepam Madura Utama | 2 | (0) |
- * Club domestic league appearances and goals as of 11 July 2012

Edi Kurnia (born 2 October 1983) is an Indonesian businessman and former footballer who played as a goalkeeper.

== Personal life ==
After retiring from football, he continued in business and is the Marketing Director of PT XTEN Indonesia, a local sports apparel company.

== Club statistics ==
| Club | Season | Super League | | Premier Division | | Piala Indonesia | | Total | |
| Club | Season | Apps | Goals | Apps | Goals | Apps | Goals | Apps | Goals |
|---|---|---|---|---|---|---|---|---|---|
| Bontang FC | 2010-11 | 22 | 0 | - | | - | | 22 | 0 |
| PSMS Medan | 2011-12 | 18 | 0 | - | | - | | 18 | 0 |
| Total | | 40 | 0 | - | | - | | 40 | 0 |
