= Handi Hamzah =

Indonesian footballer

Personal information
- Full name: Handi Hamzah
- Date of birth: 20 December 1982 (age 43)
- Place of birth: Makassar, Indonesia
- Height: 1.82 m (5 ft 11 1/2 in)
- Position: Defender

Senior career*
Years	Team	Apps	(Gls)
2008–2010	PSM Makassar	39	(1)
2010–2011	Bontang	29	(0)
2011–2013	Persiba Balikpapan	23	(0)
2013–2015	PSM Makassar	44	(2)
- * Club domestic league appearances and goals as of 11 July 2012

Handi Hamzah (born 20 December 1982) is an Indonesian former footballer.

== Club statistics ==
Club	Season	Super League		Premier Division		Piala Indonesia		Total	
Club	Season	Apps	Goals	Apps	Goals	Apps	Goals	Apps	Goals
PSM Makassar	2009-10	29	1	-		3	0	32	1
Bontang FC	2010-11	29	0	-		-		29	0
Persiba Balikpapan	2011-12	5	0	-		-		5	0
Total		63	1	-		3	0	66	1
