= Amo (surname) =

Amo is a surname. Notable people with the surname include:

- Anton Wilhelm Amo (1703–1759), African-German philosopher and writer
- Frangky Amo (born 1986), Indonesian footballer
- José María Amo (born 1998), Spanish footballer
- Pablo Amo (born 1978), Spanish footballer
