= Arey Lagoon =

Bay on the coast of Alaska, US

Coordinates: 70°05′23″N 143°52′44″W

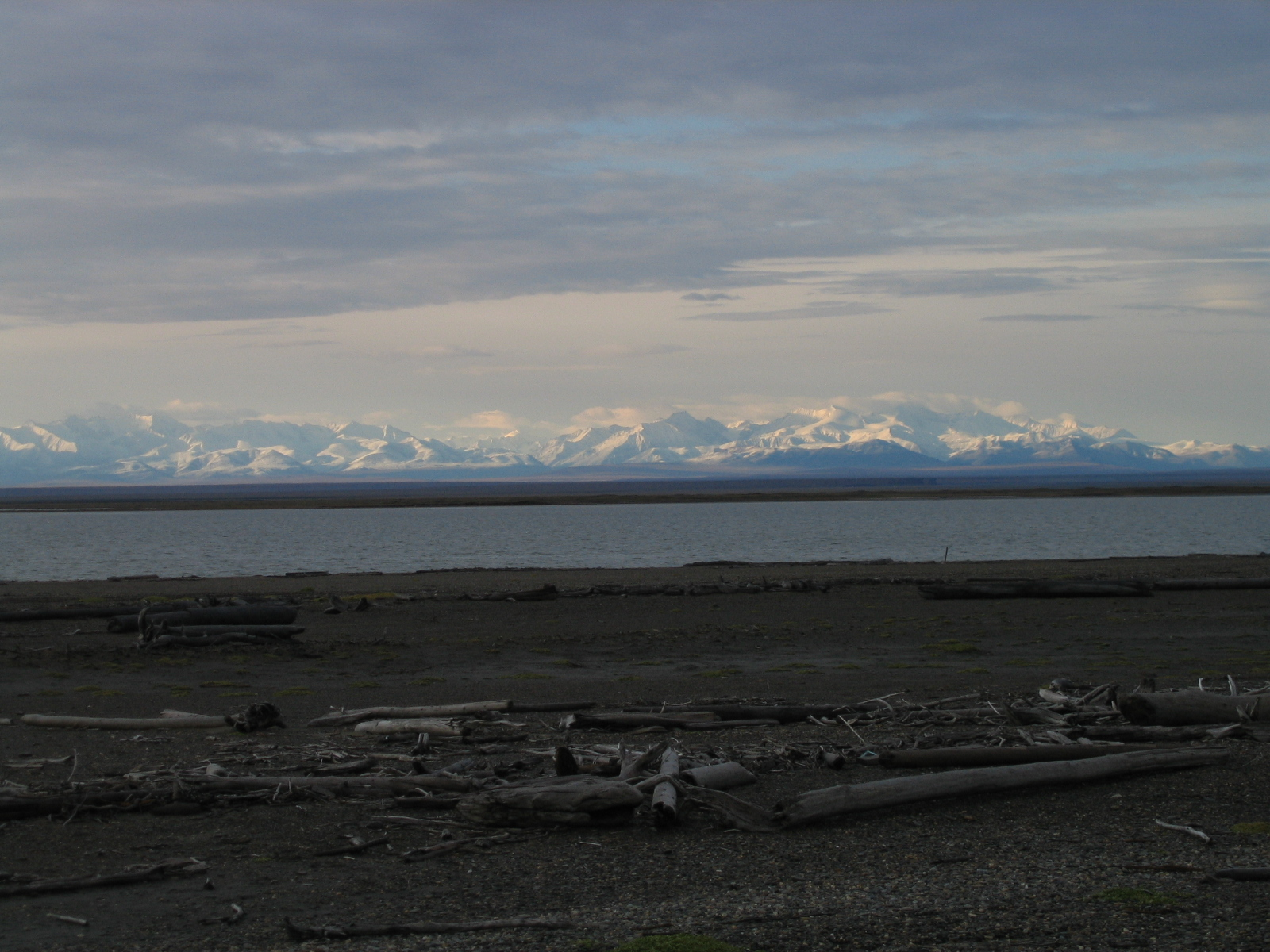
Brooks Range from Arey Island on the Alaska North Slope

Arey Lagoon is a bay on the Beaufort Sea coast of the U.S. state of Alaska. It is 7 miles (11 km) across and located between Arey Island and the mainland North Slope.
