= Juan Ramirez (footballer, born 1984) =

Paraguayan footballer

Personal information
- Full name: Juan Andres Noguera Ramirez
- Date of birth: 10 September 1984 (age 42)
- Place of birth: Paraguay
- Height: 1.83 m (6 ft 0 in)
- Position: Striker

Senior career*
| Years | Team | Apps | (Gls) |
| 2010–2011 | Pelita Jaya | 23 | (5) |
| 2014–2018 | Rapid KL | 77 | (19) |
- * Club domestic league appearances and goals

Juan Andres Noguera Ramirez (born 10 September 1984) is a Paraguayan former footballer who plays as a striker.
