= Arey, Zabaykalsky Krai =

Arey Арей
- Selo
- Location within Zabaykalsky Krai Location within Russia
- Coordinates: 50°58′N 111°14′E
- Country: Russia
- Region: Zabaykalsky Krai
- District: Ulyotovsky District
- Time zone: UTC+9:00

Arey (Russian: Арей) is a rural locality (a selo) in Ulyotovsky District, Zabaykalsky Krai, Russia. Population: 185 (2010 census); 208 (2002 census); There are 8 streets in this selo.

== Geography ==
This rural locality is located 97 km from Ulyoty (the district's administrative centre), 197 km from Chita (capital of Zabaykalsky Krai) and 5,183 km from Moscow. Shebartuy 2-y is the nearest rural locality.
