= Rudianto =

Indonesian footballer

Personal information
- Date of birth: 22 May 1985 (age 41)
- Place of birth: Indonesia
- Height: 1.70 m (5 ft 7 in)
- Position: Defender

Senior career*
Years	Team	Apps	(Gls)
2008–2012	Gresik United	38	(1)
2009–2010	→ Semen Padang (loan)	12	(1)
2012–2013	Pelita Bandung Raya	7	(0)
- * Club domestic league appearances and goals as of 11 July 2012

Rudianto (born May 22, 1986) is an Indonesian former footballer who plays as a defender.
