= Arey Island =

Barrier island in Alaska, United States

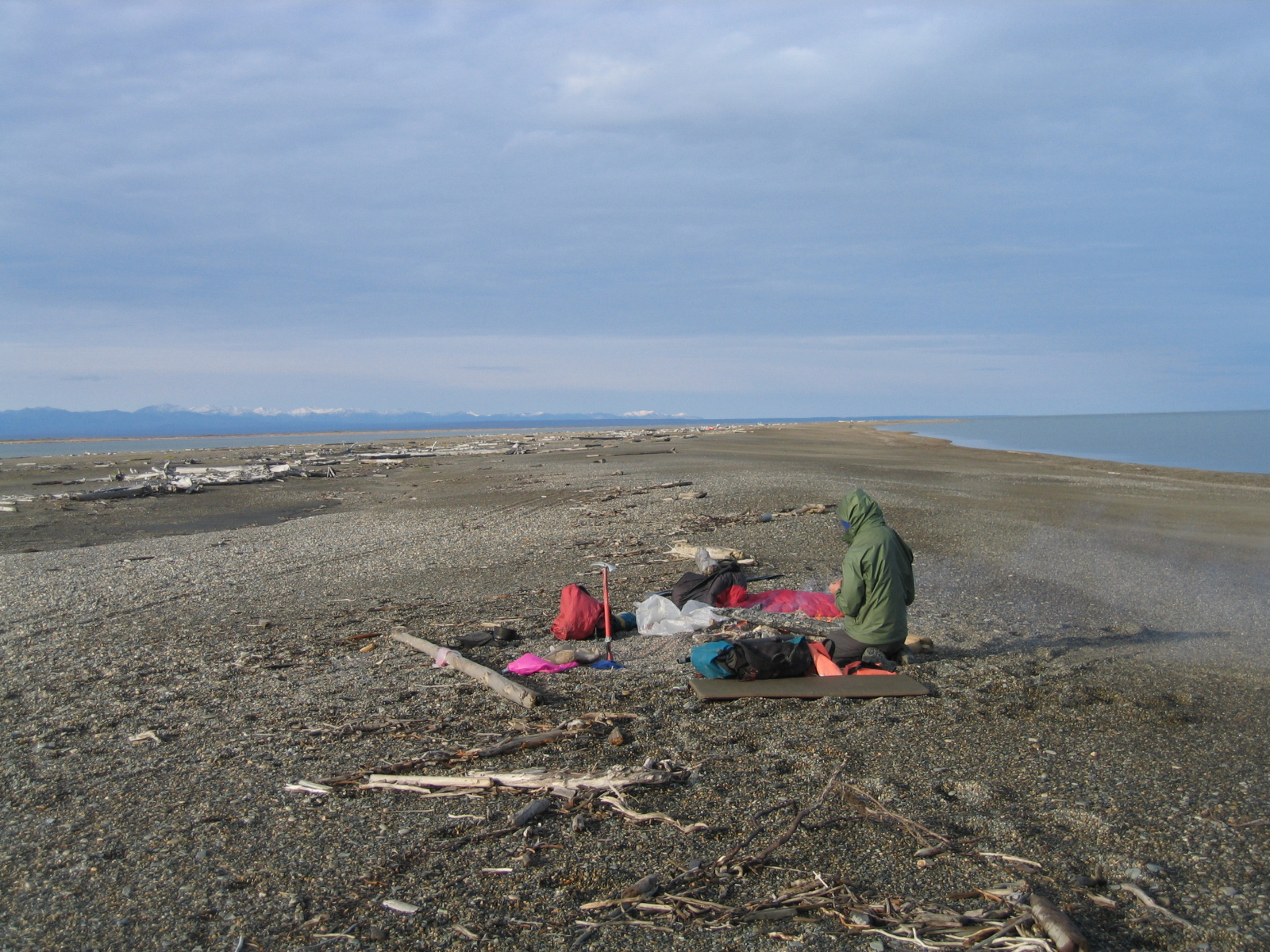
- Camping on Arey Island

- Location within Alaska

Geography
- Coordinates: 70°06′50″N 143°54′33″W
- Adjacent to: Arey Lagoon, Beaufort Sea
- Length: 7 mi (11 km)

Administration
- United States

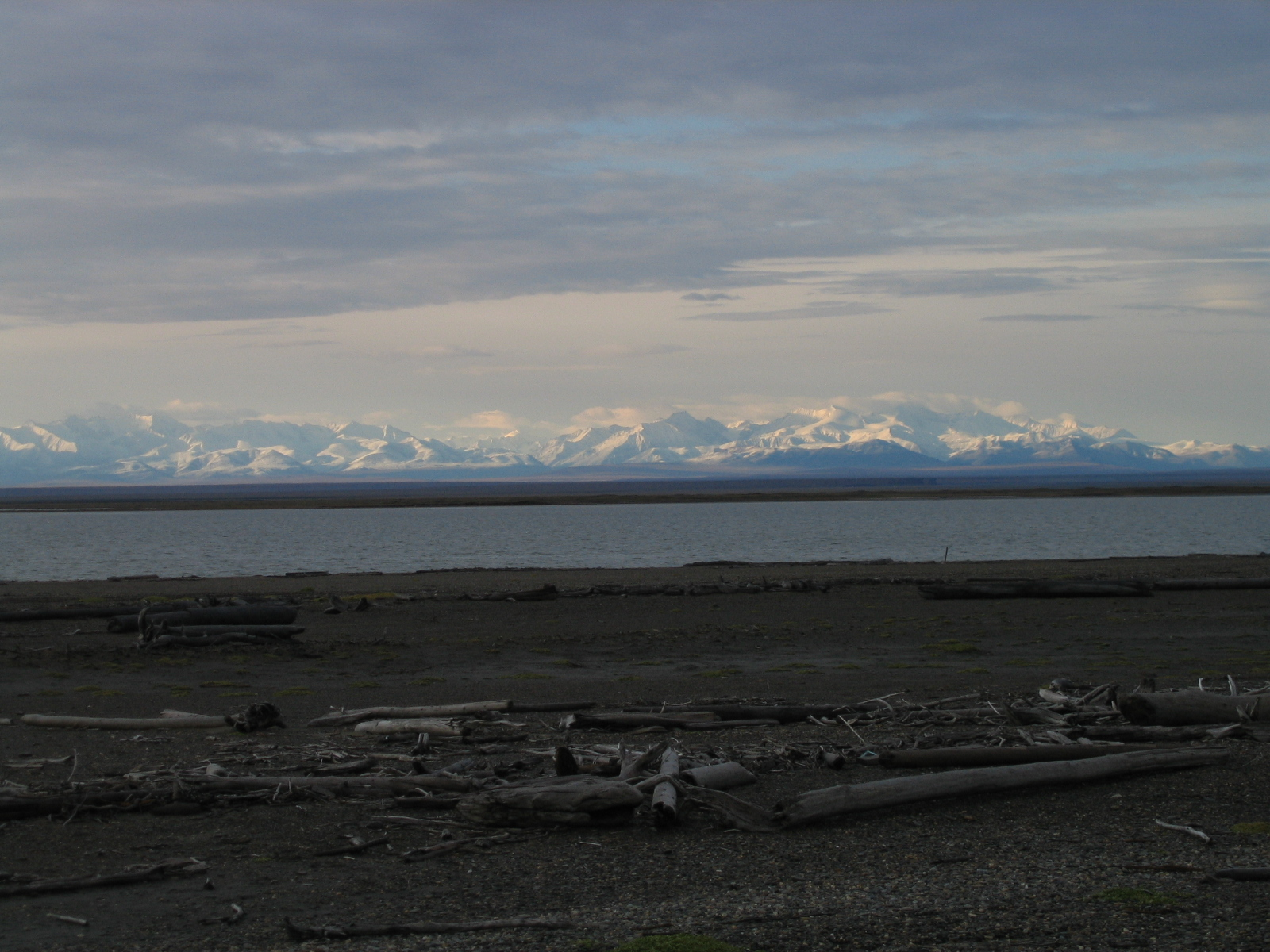
Snow-dusted Brooks Range in the view from Arey Island

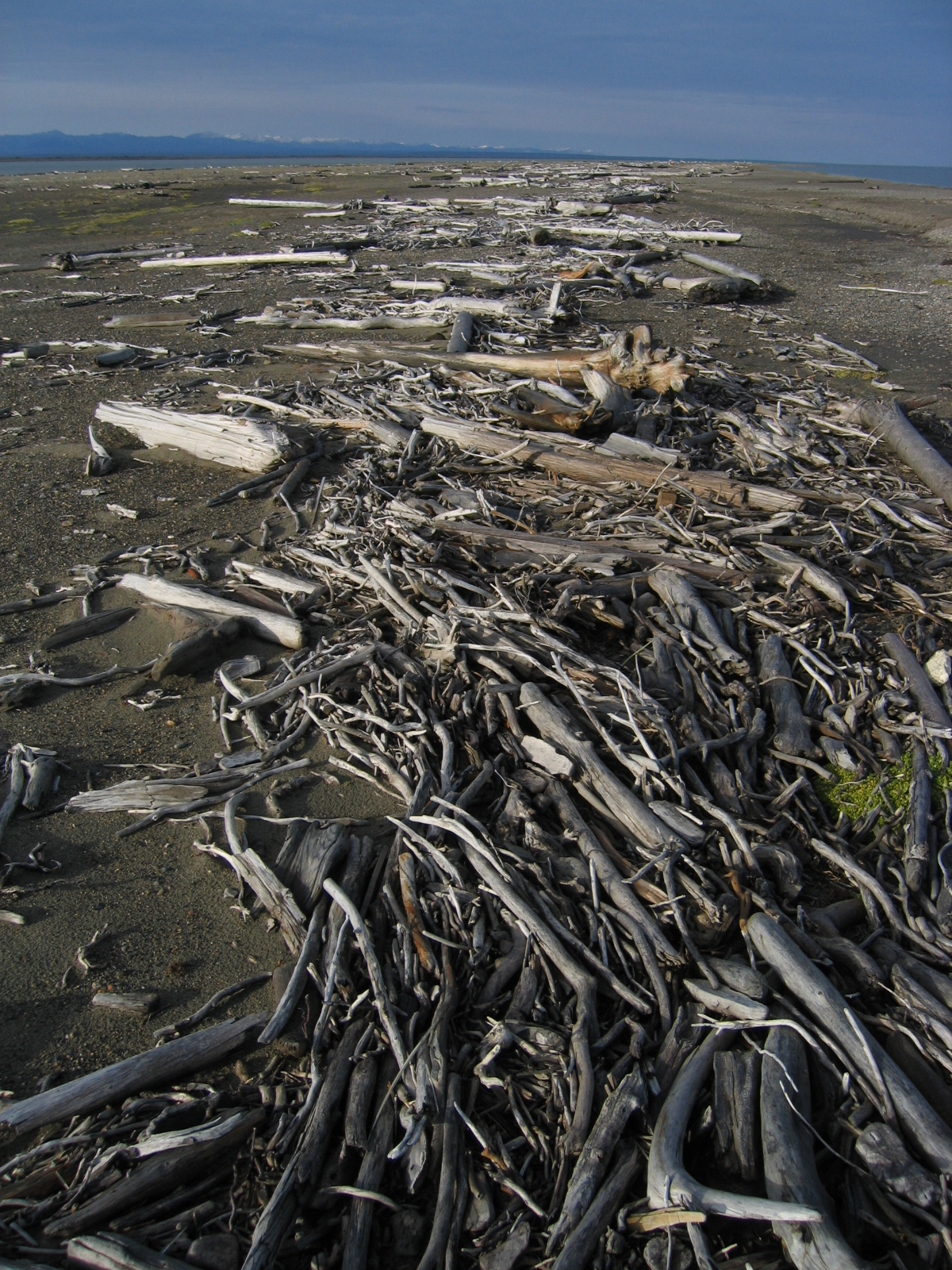
Driftwood on Arey Island

Arey Island is a 7-mile-long (11 km) barrier island on the North Slope of the U.S. state of Alaska. It is located west of Barter Island, between Arey Lagoon and the Beaufort Sea. In the past, visitors and guides have used Arey Island as a departure point from the coastal plain. Though this may still be possible, most of Arey Island is private land, so permission for its use must be obtained from, and the access fees paid to, the Kaktovik Inupiat Corporation (KIC). Without this permission, public access to Arey Island is limited.
