= Izak Ogoai =

Indonesian footballer

Personal information
- Full name: Izak Ogoai
- Date of birth: 1 January 1989 (age 37)
- Place of birth: Indonesia
- Height: 1.69 m (5 ft 6 1/2 in)
- Position: Midfielder

Senior career*
Years	Team	Apps	(Gls)
2008–2010	Persidafon Dafonsoro	9	(4)
2010–2011	Persema Malang	3	(0)
2011–2014	Persidafon Dafonsoro	44	(2)
- * Club domestic league appearances and goals

Izak Ogoai (born January 1, 1989) is an Indonesian former footballer.
