= Arrey von Dommer =

German music critic, librarian and music historian

Arrey von Dommer (9 February 1828 – 18 February 1905) was a German music critic, librarian and music historian. His articles about musicians appear in the Allgemeine Deutsche Biographie.

== Life ==
Dommer was born in Danzig (now Gdańsk in Poland) in 1828. He studied composition with Johann Christian Lobe and Ernst Richter in Leipzig, and afterwards was a music teacher. In 1863 he moved to Hamburg, where he was a music critic and from 1873 librarian in the city library.

He published in 1865 an enlarged edition of Heinrich Christoph Koch's 1802 reference work on music, the Musikalische Lexikon. Articles from Dommer's edition are included in the Allgemeine Deutsche Biographie. In 1868 he published the Handbuch der Musikgeschichte, von den ersten Anfängen bis zum Tode Beethovens ("Handbook of the history of music, from the first beginnings up to the death of Beethoven"). An edition by Arnold Schering was published in 1914.

After retirement in 1889 Dommer moved to Marburg; he died in Treysa in 1905.
