= Sukman Suaib =

Indonesian footballer

Personal information
- Full name: Sukman Suaib
- Date of birth: 27 June 1983 (age 43)
- Place of birth: Pidie, Indonesia
- Height: 1.67 m (5 ft 5 1/2 in)
- Position: Midfielder

Senior career*
| Years | Team | Apps | (Gls) |
| 2008–2014 | PSAP Sigli | 64 | (6) |
- * Club domestic league appearances and goals as of 11 July 2012

Sukman Suaib (born June 27, 1983) is an Indonesian former footballer.

== Club statistics ==
| Club | Season | Super League | | Premier Division | | Piala Indonesia | | Total | |
| Club | Season | Apps | Goals | Apps | Goals | Apps | Goals | Apps | Goals |
|---|---|---|---|---|---|---|---|---|---|
| PSAP Sigli | 2011-12 | 31 | 2 | - | | - | | 31 | 2 |
| Total | | 31 | 2 | - | | - | | 31 | 2 |
