= Rafael Bastos (footballer, born 1982) =

Brazilian footballer

Personal information
- Full name: Rafael Alves Bastos
- Date of birth: 17 April 1982 (age 44)
- Place of birth: Rio de Janeiro, Brazil
- Height: 1.80 m (5 ft 11 in)
- Position: Striker

Senior career*
Years	Team	Apps	(Gls)
2004–2006	Tigres do Brasil		
2006–2008	America RJ		
2008–2009	Persib Bandung	27	(10)
- * Club domestic league appearances and goals as of 30 May 2009

Rafael Alves Bastos (born March 17, 1982) is a Brazilian footballer who previously played for Persib Bandung in the Indonesia Super League.
