= Supandi =

Indonesian footballer

Personal information
- Date of birth: 24 May 1989 (age 37)
- Place of birth: Sidoarjo, Indonesia
- Height: 1.69 m (5 ft 6 1/2 in)
- Position: Defender

Senior career*
Years	Team	Apps	(Gls)
2011–2012	Deltras	16	(1)
2013–2014	Gresik United	7	(0)
2014–2015	PSM Makassar	10	(0)
- * Club domestic league appearances and goals as of 11 July 2012

Supandi (born 24 May 1989) is an Indonesian former footballer who plays as a defender.
