= Supriyono Salimin =

Indonesian footballer

Supriyono
Personal information
- Full name: Supriyono Salimin
- Date of birth: 10 August 1981 (age 45)
- Place of birth: Semarang, Indonesia
- Height: 1.70 m (5 ft 7 in)
- Positions: Full-back; winger

Senior career*
Years	Team	Apps	(Gls)
1999–2000	PSIS Semarang		
2001–2002	PSMS Medan	16	(3)
2003–2004	Persikota Tangerang		
2004	→ Persipasi Bekasi (loan)		
2005–2006	Persita Tangerang		
2007	Persmin Minahasa	30	(2)
2008–2009	Persija Jakarta		
2009–2010	Persebaya Surabaya	26	(0)
2010–2011	PSM Makassar	11	(0)
2011–2013	Persisam Putra	57	(0)
2014–2016	Gresik United	0	(0)
2017	Persibat Batang	17	(0)
2018	Perserang Serang	20	(0)

International career
2001–2003	Indonesia U23		
2002–2005	Indonesia	13	(0)
- * Club domestic league appearances and goals

Supriyono Salimin (born 10 August 1981) is an Indonesian former footballer who played as full-back.

== Club career ==
He started his career in the season 1999–2000, with PSIS Semarang. In 2001, he moved to PSMS Medan, playing 2 seasons. He got his first national team call-up whilst with this club in 2002. In 2003, he returned to Java with Persikota Tangerang. He was then loaned to Persipasi Bekasi for 6 months.

In 2005, he signed a 2-year contract with Persita Tangerang. In the 2007 Liga Indonesia Premier Division he played for Persmin Minahasa, enjoying 30 matches and scoring 2 goals. After the team folded because of financial problems, he moved to Persija Jakarta.

In the 2009-10 Indonesia Super League, he played 26 matches for Persebaya Surabaya. After one season in Surabaya, he moved to Makassar to join PSM Makassar. He played in 11 matches that season. Last season he signed a contract with Samarindan club Persisam Putra Samarinda. He played 30 matches and he received 4 yellow cards.

In December 2014, he signed with Gresik United.

== International career ==
He started his international career with the Indonesia national football team in 2002.

== Honours ==
Indonesia

- AFF Championship runner-up: 2002
