= Guti Ribeiro =

Portuguese footballer

Personal information
- Full name: Gustavo Beirão Gramaço Ribeiro
- Date of birth: 1 December 1984 (age 41)
- Place of birth: Almada, Portugal
- Height: 1.85 m (6 ft 1 in)
- Position: Forward

Youth career
- 1995–2003: Almada

Senior career*
Years	Team	Apps	(Gls)
2003–2005	Almada		
2005–2006	Montijo	35	(12)
2006–2007	Sportfreunde Siegen	0	(0)
2007	Compostela	17	(2)
2008	Lalín		
2008–2009	Eordaikos	11	(0)
2009	Odysseas Anagennisi	11	(1)
2009–2010	Anagennisi Karditsa	22	(5)
2010	Persijap Jepara	7	(0)
2011	Bintang Medan	20	(5)
2011–2012	St. Andrews	12	(5)
2012–2013	Onisilos Sotira	13	(1)
2013	Mariehamn	0	(0)
2013	Bad Füssing		
2014	SC Schwaz	9	(2)
- * Club domestic league appearances and goals

Gustavo 'Guti' Beirão Gramaço Ribeiro (born 1 December 1984 in Almada, Setúbal District) is a Portuguese former professional footballer who played as a forward.

He used to play in the Regionalliga. He played for Schwaz, making his debut coming off the bench, for IFK Mariehamn, on 6 March 2013 against HJK Helsinki in a 0-4 loss.
