= Kim Yong-han =

South Korean footballer (born 1986)

Kim Yong-Han
Personal information
- Full name: Kim Yong-Han
- Date of birth: June 28, 1986 (age 40)
- Place of birth: South Korea
- Height: 1.80 m (5 ft 11 in)
- Positions: Midfielder; forward

Senior career*
Years	Team	Apps	(Gls)
2005–2008	Incheon United	0	(0)
2008	Hongcheon Idu	16	(1)
2009	Nowon Hummel	18	(3)
2010	Busan Transportation Corporation	20	(8)
2010–2011	Persela Lamongan	12	(2)
2011–2012	Persiba Bantul	40	(5)
2012–2013	Persiwa Wamena	17	(0)
2013–2014	Persijap Jepara	24	(3)
2017–2019	Songwol	39	(10)
- * Club domestic league appearances and goals as of 1 June 2013

Kim Yong-Han (Korean: 김용한; born June 28, 1986) is a South Korean former footballer who plays as a forward.

He played for Incheon United in the K-League.

In Incheon, Kim played 3 games in the 2006 Hauzen Cup.
