= Abdul Faisal =

Indonesian footballer

Personal information
- Full name: Abdul Faisal
- Date of birth: 27 March 1986 (age 40)
- Place of birth: Indonesia
- Height: 1.71 m (5 ft 7 1/2 in)
- Position: Midfielder

Senior career*
Years	Team	Apps	(Gls)
2008–2009	PSP Padang	24	(2)
2009–2010	PSSB Bireuen	23	(5)
2010–2014	PSAP Sigli	63	(8)
2015	PSP Padang	0	(0)
- * Club domestic league appearances and goals

Abdul Faisal (born March 27, 1986) is an Indonesian former footballer.

== Club statistics ==
Club	Season	Super League		Premier Division		Piala Indonesia		Total	
Club	Season	Apps	Goals	Apps	Goals	Apps	Goals	Apps	Goals
PSAP Sigli	2011-12	33	2	-		-		33	2
Total		33	2	-		-		33	2
