= Lac Nère =

Lake in Hautes-Pyrénées, France

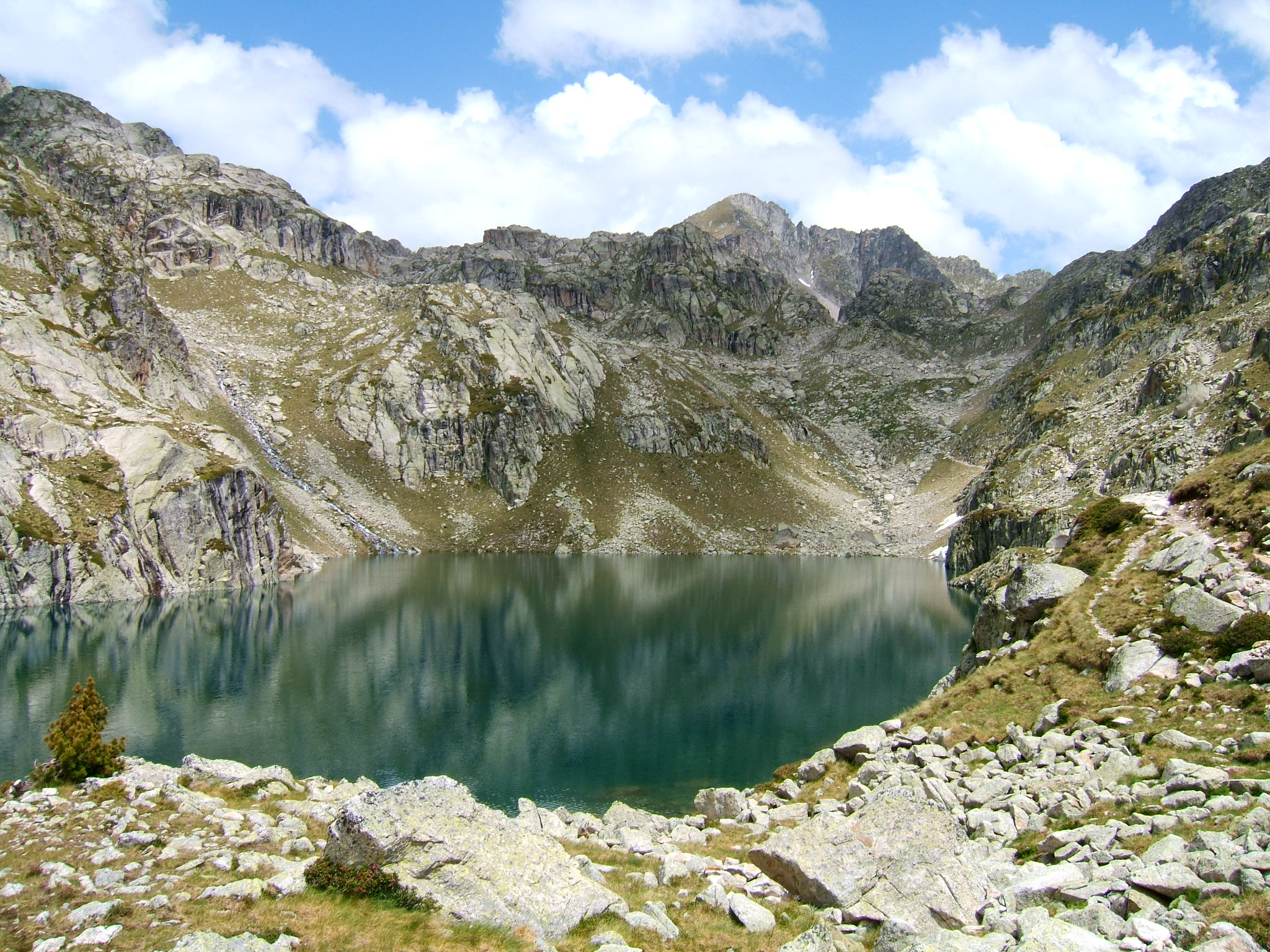

- Location within France
- Location: Hautes-Pyrénées
- Coordinates: 42.835°N 0.203°W
- Basin countries: France
- Surface area: 0.02 km^{2} (220,000 sq ft)
- Surface elevation: 2,309 m (7,575 ft)

Lac Nère is a lake in Hautes-Pyrénées, France. At an elevation of 2,309 metres (7,575 ft), its surface area is 0.02 km^{2} (220,000 sq ft).
