= David Faristian =

Indonesian footballer

Personal information
- Full name: David Faristian
- Date of birth: 15 December 1989 (age 36)
- Place of birth: Gresik, East Java, Indonesia
- Height: 1.69 m (5 ft 6 1/2 in)
- Position: Midfielder

Youth career
- Persegres Suratin
- Persipur Suratin

Senior career*
Years	Team	Apps	(Gls)
2007–2008	Persipur Purwodadi	12	(3)
2008–2018	Gresik United	70	(3)
2010–2011	→ Barito Putera (loan)	15	(1)
2019	Putra Sinar Giri	0	(0)
- * Club domestic league appearances and goals

David Faristian (born December 15, 1989, in Gresik, East Java) is an Indonesian former footballer.
