= Kuantan Singingi Sport Centre Stadium =

Multi-purpose stadium in Kuantan Singingi Regency, Indonesia

Stadion Sport Centre Kuansing
- Interactive map of Stadion Sport Centre Kuansing
- Location: Koto Taluk, Riau, Indonesia
- Coordinates: 0.5261°S 101.5320°E
- Capacity: 25,000

Kuansing Sport Centre Stadium is a multi-purpose stadium in Kuantan Singingi Regency, Indonesia. It is currently used mostly for football matches.
