= Mayona Amtop =

Indonesian footballer

Personal information
- Full name: Ponsianus Y. Mayona Amtop
- Date of birth: 28 July 1985
- Place of birth: Merauke, Indonesia
- Date of death: 23 April 2019 (aged 33)
- Place of death: Indonesia
- Height: 1.70 m (5 ft 7 in)
- Positions: Striker; midfielder; right back

Senior career*
Years	Team	Apps	(Gls)
2007	Persidago Gorontalo	19	(1)
2008	Persekabpas Pasuruan	21	(7)
2009	Perseman Manokwari	11	(2)
2009	Persema Malang	19	(2)
2009–2010	PSM Makassar	22	(0)
2010	PSIS Semarang	13	(0)
2011	Persemalra Maluku Tenggara	16	(0)
2011–2013	Gresik United	39	(8)
- * Club domestic league appearances and goals as of 11 July 2012

Ponsianus Y. Mayona Amtop (28 July 1985 – 23 April 2019) was an Indonesian footballer who played as a striker, midfielder and right back.
