= Yan D. Ruatakurey =

Indonesian footballer

Yan Ruatakurey
Personal information
- Full name: Yan D. Ruatakurey
- Date of birth: 7 September 1979 (age 47)
- Place of birth: Indonesia
- Height: 1.70 m (5 ft 7 in)
- Position: Striker

Senior career*
Years	Team	Apps	(Gls)
2011–2013	Persiram Raja Ampat	27	(2)
- * Club domestic league appearances and goals as of 11 July 2012

Yan D. Ruatakurey (born September 7, 1979) is an Indonesian former footballer.

== Club statistics ==
Club	Season	Super League		Premier Division		Piala Indonesia		Total	
Club	Season	Apps	Goals	Apps	Goals	Apps	Goals	Apps	Goals
Persiram Raja Ampat	2011-12	16	2	-		-		16	2
Total		16	2	-		-		16	2
