= Sukasto Efendi =

Indonesian association footballer

Personal information
- Full name: Sukasto Efendi
- Date of birth: 21 January 1981 (age 45)
- Place of birth: Malang, Indonesia
- Height: 1.72 m (5 ft 8 in)
- Position: Goalkeeper

Senior career*
Years	Team	Apps	(Gls)
2000–2004	Persekaba Badung	32	(0)
2004–2013	Persema Malang	165	(0)
2014	Gresik United	9	(0)
2015–2017	Perseru Serui	54	(0)
2018	Madura	5	(0)
2019	Persis Solo	4	(0)
2019	PSGC Ciamis	9	(0)
2020–2021	Kalteng Putra	2	(0)
Total		280	(0)
- * Club domestic league appearances and goals

Sukasto Efendi (born 21 January 1981) is an Indonesian former footballer who plays as a goalkeeper.

== Club career ==
=== Kalteng Putra ===
He was signed for Kalteng Putra to play in Liga 2 in the 2020 season. This season was suspended on 27 March 2020 due to the COVID-19 pandemic. The season was abandoned and was declared void on 20 January 2021.

== Honours ==
Persema Malang

- Liga Indonesia Premier Division runner up: 2008–09
