= Aldo Barreto =

Paraguayan footballer (born 1981)

Personal information
- Full name: Francisco Aldo Barreto Miranda
- Date of birth: 1 March 1981 (age 45)
- Place of birth: Abai, Caazapá, Paraguay
- Height: 1.82 m (6 ft 0 in)
- Position: Striker

Youth career
- 1999–2002: Cerro Porteño PF

Senior career*
Years	Team	Apps	(Gls)
2002–2003	Cerro Porteño PF	40	(21)
2003–2004	Club Guaraní	22	(11)
2004–2005	BEC Tero Sasana	23	(14)
2005–2006	Huracán Buceo	12	(6)
2006	Cerro Corá	17	(8)
2006–2009	PSM Makassar	62	(28)
2009	→ Persisam Putra (loan)	16	(13)
2009–2010	Bontang	34	(20)
2010–2012	Persiba Balikpapan	57	(33)
2013–2014	Gresik United	22	(8)
2014	Persikabo Bogor	17	(8)
2014	Sportivo Luqueño	25	(7)
2014–2015	Cerro Porteño PF	10	(0)
2016−2017	30 Unidos	21	(6)
Total		378	(183)
- * Club domestic league appearances and goals

Francisco Aldo Barreto Miranda (Note: In this Spanish name, the first or paternal surname is Barreto and the second or maternal family name is Miranda.) (born 1 March 1981), known as Aldo Barreto, is a Paraguayan former footballer who plays as a forward. He was the leading goal scorer of the 2009/2010 season with a small team, Bontang FC, he scored nineteen goals in thirty-one appearances. Then he moved to another East Kalimantan club, Persiba Balikpapan.

== Career ==
Barreto began his career in Cerro Porteño PF before transferring to Club Guaraní of Asunción.

=== Persikabo Bogor ===
He joined Persikabo in the Indonesia Second Division on 14 March 2014.

== Honours ==
Persisam Putra

- Liga Indonesia Premier Division: 2008–09

Individual

- Liga Indonesia Premier Division Best Player: 2008–09
- Indonesia Super League Top Goalscorer: 2009–10

== See also ==
- List of Indonesian football competitions all-time top scorers
- 2011 Indonesia Super League All-Star Game
- 2011–12 Indonesia Super League goalscorers
- 2012 Indonesia Super League All-Star team
