= Nasution Karubaba =

Indonesian footballer

Karubaba Nasution
Personal information
- Full name: Nasution Karubaba
- Date of birth: 27 November 1989 (age 36)
- Place of birth: Indonesia
- Height: 1.72 m (5 ft 7 1/2 in)
- Positions: Winger; full-back

Youth career
- 2008: Persisam U-23

Senior career*
Years	Team	Apps	(Gls)
2008–2009	Persisam Putra	18	(1)
2009–2011	Perseman Manokwari	32	(5)
2011–2012	Persiram Raja Ampat	30	(2)
2013	Perseman Manokwari	21	(0)
Total		101	(8)

International career
2009–2011	Indonesia U-23		
- * Club domestic league appearances and goals

Nasution Karubaba (born 27 November 1989) is an Indonesian former footballer.

== Club statistics ==
Club	Season	Super League		Premier Division		Piala Indonesia		Total	
Club	Season	Apps	Goals	Apps	Goals	Apps	Goals	Apps	Goals
Persiram Raja Ampat	2011-12	30	2	-		-		30	2
Total		30	2	-		-		30	2

== Honours ==
Persisam Putra

- Liga Indonesia Premier Division: 2008–09
