= Victor Simon Badawi =

Indonesian footballer

Victor Simon
Personal information
- Full name: Victor Simon Badawi
- Date of birth: 17 February 1980 (age 46)
- Place of birth: Sanga-Sanga, Indonesia
- Height: 1.75 m (5 ft 9 in)
- Position: Defender

Senior career*
| Years | Team | Apps | (Gls) |
| 2006–2007 | Persema Malang | 23 | (0) |
| 2008 | Persita Tangerang | 11 | (0) |
| 2009 | Persisam Putra | 7 | (0) |
| 2009–2010 | PSIR Rembang | 31 | (2) |
| 2010–2014 | Mitra Kukar | 53 | (3) |
| Total | | 125 | (5) |
- * Club domestic league appearances and goals

Victor Simon Badawi (born 17 February 1980) is an Indonesian former footballer who currently plays as a defender.

== Honours ==
Persisam Putra

- Liga Indonesia Premier Division: 2008–09
