= Jaelaniu Arey =

Indonesian footballer

Jaelani Arey
Personal information
- Full name: Jaelani Arey Sibi
- Date of birth: April 24, 1990 (age 36)
- Place of birth: Wamena, Indonesia
- Height: 1.69 m (5 ft 6 1/2 in)
- Position: Full-back

Team information
- Current team: Toli (assistant coach)

Senior career*
Years	Team	Apps	(Gls)
2010–2011	Persipura Jayapura	5	(0)
2011–2012	Persiwa Wamena	32	(7)
2012–2013	Persidafon Dafonsoro	16	(1)
2013–2014	Persiwa Wamena	12	(1)
2014–2018	Persipura Jayapura	17	(0)
2018–2020	Perseru Serui	26	(0)

Managerial career
- 2021–: Toli (assistant coach)
- * Club domestic league appearances and goals

Jaelani Arey Sibi (born 24 April 1990) is an Indonesian football manager and former player who is assistant coach of Liga 3 club Toli.

== Club career ==
He joined Persipura Jayapura for the 2014 Indonesia Super League.
