= Mitchell Nere =

Indonesian footballer (born 1988)

Personal information
- Full name: Mitchell Leonardo Nere
- Date of birth: 11 August 1988 (age 38)
- Place of birth: Jakarta, Indonesia
- Height: 1.75 m (5 ft 9 in)
- Position: Midfielder

Youth career
- 2006: Pelita Jaya

Senior career*
Years	Team	Apps	(Gls)
2007–2008	Pelita Jaya	0	(0)
2008–2009	PSMS Medan	4	(0)
2009–2010	Pro Duta	6	(0)
2011–2014	Persidafon Dafonsoro	32	(3)

International career^{‡}
2005–2006	Indonesia U-19	5	(2)
- * Club domestic league appearances and goals ‡ National team caps and goals as of September 2006

Mitchell Leonardo Nere (born August 11, 1988) is an Indonesian former footballer.

== Pensonal life ==
He is the son of Indonesia's national team star in the 70's and 80's era Rully Nere who last a head coach for Indonesia women's national team.
