= Frangky Amo =

Indonesian footballer

Personal information
- Full name: Frangky Pius Daniel Amo
- Date of birth: 27 February 1986 (age 40)
- Place of birth: Jayapura, Indonesia
- Height: 1.75 m (5 ft 9 in)
- Position: Left back

Senior career*
Years	Team	Apps	(Gls)
2008–2015	Persidafon Dafonsoro	117	(6)
- * Club domestic league appearances and goals as of 11 July 2012

Frangky Amo (born February 27, 1986) is an Indonesian former footballer who plays as a left-back.

== Club statistics ==
Club	Season	Super League		Premier Division		Piala Indonesia		Total	
Club	Season	Apps	Goals	Apps	Goals	Apps	Goals	Apps	Goals
Persidafon Dafonsoro	2011-12	6	0	-		-		6	0
Total		6	0	-		-		6	0
