= Ade Suhendra (footballer, born 1987) =

Indonesian footballer

Personal information
- Full name: Ade Suhendra
- Date of birth: 10 June 1987 (age 39)
- Place of birth: Bekasi, Indonesia
- Height: 1.77 m (5 ft 9 1/2 in)
- Position: Defender

Senior career*
Years	Team	Apps	(Gls)
2007–2010	Persih Tembilahan	20	(0)
2010–2011	PSPS Pekanbaru	10	(0)
2011–2012	Gresik United	24	(0)
2013–2014	Persiba Balikpapan	28	(0)
2015–2016	Persih Tembilahan	5	(0)
2017–2018	Gresik United	15	(0)
- * Club domestic league appearances and goals as of 5 November 2017

Ade Suhendra (born June 10, 1987) is an Indonesian former footballer.
