= Zico Rumkabu =

Indonesian footballer

Personal information
- Full name: Samuel Fransisco Rumkabu
- Date of birth: 21 February 1989 (age 37)
- Place of birth: Jayapura, Indonesia
- Height: 1.58 m (5 ft 2 in)
- Position: Midfielder

Youth career
- 2007: PS Elang
- 2008–2010: Persipura U-21

Senior career*
Years	Team	Apps	(Gls)
2011–2013	Persidafon Dafonsoro	45	(1)
- * Club domestic league appearances and goals as of 2 July 2012

Samuel Francisco Rumkabu (born February 21, 1989, in Abepura, Jayapura) is an Indonesian former footballer.
