= Lukas Rumkabu =

Indonesian footballer

Personal information
- Full name: Lukas Ronald Rumkabu
- Date of birth: 13 July 1977 (age 49)
- Place of birth: Jayapura, Indonesia
- Height: 1.70 m (5 ft 7 in)
- Position: Striker

Senior career*
Years	Team	Apps	(Gls)
2002	Persipura Jayapura	17	(2)
2003−2004	Petrokimia Putra	23	(8)
2005−2006	Persekaba Badung	17	(1)
2007−2014	Persidafon Dafonsoro	117	(13)
- * Club domestic league appearances and goals as of 6 July 2012

Lukas Ronald Rumkabu (born July 13, 1977) is an Indonesian former footballer.

== Personal life ==
His young brother Zico Rumkabu is also professional footballer both play together in Persidafon Dafonsoro started from 2010-11 season.
