= Nyeck Nyobe =

Cameroonian footballer

Personal information
- Full name: Georges Clement Nyeck Nyobe
- Date of birth: 18 March 1983 (age 43)
- Place of birth: Cameroon
- Height: 1.83 m (6 ft 0 in)
- Position: Defender

Senior career*
Years	Team	Apps	(Gls)
2007–2008	Persib Bandung	18	(2)
2008–2009	Persela Lamongan	24	(2)
2009–2010	PSMS Medan	22	(2)
2010–2011	Bontang FC	23	(2)
- * Club domestic league appearances and goals

Georges Clement Nyeck Nyobe (born 18 March 1983) is a former Cameroonian professional footballer.
