= 2025–26 Liga 4 Papua =

Liga 4 Papua (Cendrawasih Karsa Liga 4 Governor's Cup)
- Season: 2025–26
- Dates: 16 March – 8 April 2026
- Teams: 8
- Champions: Persiker
- Runner up: Nafri
- National phase: Persiker
- Matches: 28
- Goals: 75 (2.68 per match)

The 2025–26 Liga 4 Papua (also known as the 2025–26 Cendrawasih Karsa Liga 4 Governor's Cup for sponsorship reasons) is the inaugural season of the fourth-tier football competition in Indonesia organized by the Provincial Association (Asprov) of PSSI Papua. The competition serves as the regional qualifying round for the national phase of the 2025–26 Liga 4.

The tournament is held in Sentani, Jayapura Regency, with the opening ceremony and kick-off scheduled for 16 March 2026 at the Barnabas Youwe Stadium.

== Background ==
The preparation for the 2025–26 Liga 4 Papua was marked by several administrative adjustments and strategic mandates from the Provincial Association (Asprov) of PSSI Papua. Initially, the association aimed for a participation of 14 clubs to compete in the regional qualifying round.

A key regulation established for this season was the mandatory participation of member clubs. Asprov PSSI Papua decreed that any club wishing to retain their status as "voters" for the upcoming PSSI Papua Extraordinary Congress (KLB) must participate in the competition. Under the 2025 PSSI Statutes, member clubs that fail to participate in official competitions for two consecutive years risk losing their voting rights.

The competition schedule underwent several revisions. Originally planned for February 2026, the registration period and the official kick-off were postponed to March to allow regional clubs more time to finalize their administrative and financial requirements. Asprov PSSI Papua emphasized the importance of early preparation to ensure a high-quality competition that could serve as a talent scouting platform for the Papua regional team ahead of the Pra-PON (National Sports Week) for NTT-NTB.

In the weeks leading up to the kick-off, participating teams intensified their preparations. Notably, the local government of Yapen Islands officially launched the PS Yapen squad, signaling their readiness to compete despite the anticipated dense match schedule. The tournament is officially sponsored by Cendrawasih karsa, ensuring that all matches are accessible to the public through digital broadcasting.

Despite the initial target of 14 teams, the final list of participants was confirmed as eight clubs following the conclusion of the registration and verification process. This adjustment was attributed to the stringent administrative and financial requirements, including the registration fee and the mandatory club licensing standards set by the association. The eight confirmed teams were those that successfully fulfilled these criteria by the final deadline on 5 March 2026, officially securing their spots in the competition during the Match Coordination Meeting (MCM) held at the Waringin Sports Hall.

== Teams ==
Following the Match Coordination Meeting (MCM) on 14 March 2026, eight teams were officially confirmed to participate in the 2025–26 Liga 4 Papua. The registration period, which was extended to 5 March 2026, required clubs to fulfill specific administrative standards and a registration fee to maintain their voting rights within the PSSI Papua Provincial Association. The tournament serves as a crucial scouting ground for the Papua regional team ahead of the Pra-PON NTB–NTT, with all matches broadcast live to reach football fans across the land of Papua.

Locations of teams competing in the 2025–26 Liga 4 Papua

No	Team	Nickname	Location	2023 season^{†}
1	Persidafon	Sentani Sawfish	Jayapura Regency	did not participate
2	Nafri	Papuan Crabs	Jayapura City	did not participate
3	Persiker	Frontier Storm	Keerom Regency	5th place
4	Persiweja	Saltwater Crocodile from the East	Mamberamo Raya Regency	10th place
5	Persimi	North Coast Storm	Sarmi Regency	did not participate
6	Waribo	—	Waropen Regency	did not participate
7	Eleven Wise	—	Biak Numfor Regency	did not participate
8	PS Yapen	The Black Orange	Yapen Islands Regency	did not participate

^{†} Results from the 2023 Liga 3 Papua.

== Format ==
Following the Match Coordination Meeting (MCM), the competition format was confirmed as a single round-robin group featuring all eight participating teams. Each team plays every other team once in a centralized league system. The team finishing at the top of the standings after seven matchdays will be crowned champions and qualify for the national phase of the 2025–26 Liga 4.

== Sponsorship ==
The 2025–26 season is primarily sponsored by Cendrawasih Karsa. As the main partner, Cendrawasih Karsa provides full broadcasting coverage for all matches via their official YouTube channel, allowing spectators across the Papua region to watch the competition live.

== Venue ==
All matches are held at a single centralized venue:

Stadium	Location	Capacity
Barnabas Youwe Stadium	Sentani	15,000

== Standings ==
The eight participating teams compete in a single round-robin league format, with all matches held at the Barnabas Youwe Stadium in Sentani. Each team plays against every other team once, and the standings are determined based on the total points earned during the matches. The top teams in the table qualify for the national phase of the competition.

=== League table ===
Pos	Team	Pld	W	D	L	GF	GA	GD	Pts	Qualification
1	Persiker	7	6	1	0	12	2	+10	19	Qualification to national phase
2	Nafri	7	4	1	2	10	8	+2	13	
3	Persidafon	7	4	0	3	10	8	+2	12	
4	PS Yapen	7	3	2	2	12	7	+5	11	
5	Persimi	7	3	0	4	9	10	−1	9	
6	Eleven Wise	7	2	2	3	10	9	+1	8	
7	Persiweja	7	2	2	3	7	10	−3	8	
8	Waribo	7	0	0	7	5	21	−16	0	

=== Matchday ===
The 2025–26 Liga 4 Papua group stage is held from 16 March to 8 April 2026 at Barnabas Youwe Stadium, Sentani. This centralized tournament features eight teams divided into two groups of four. The competition is officially opened by the Governor of Papua, Matius D. Fakhiri, starting with a match between Persimi Sarmi and Persiker Keerom. All matches are broadcast live via the Cendrawasih karsa YouTube channel to ensure maximum accessibility for fans across the Papua region. The match schedule for the Cendrawasih Karsa Liga 4 Papua was also announced by the Asprov PSSI Papua through their official Instagram account.

Matchday 1 (16, 26 March and 8 April 2026)

==== Monday, 16 March 2026 ====
16 March 2026
15:30 (UTC+09:00)

Persimi	0–1	Persiker
	Report	2' A. Yandedai

Barnabas Youwe Stadium, Sentani

==== Thursday, 26 March 2026 ====
26 March 2026
13:30 (UTC+09:00)

PS Yapen	3–1	Waribo
K. Wopi 17', 54'; Fernando T. 33'	Report	57' G.R. Worembai

Barnabas Youwe Stadium, Sentani
26 March 2026
15:30 (UTC+09:00)

Nafri	0–2	Persidafon
	Report	44' M. Pangkali; 58' Jason T.

Barnabas Youwe Stadium, Sentani

==== Wednesday, 8 April 2026 ====
8 April 2026
14:30 (UTC+09:00)

Eleven Wise	1–1	Persiweja
	Report

Barnabas Youwe Stadium, Sentani

Matchday 2 (17–18 March 2026)

==== Tuesday, 17 March 2026 ====
17 March 2026
13:30 (UTC+09:00)

Waribo	1–3	Persiweja
Y.Y. Dacosta 90+3' (pen.)	Report	8' H. Wesapla; 20' Number 17; 52' F. Lotar

Barnabas Youwe Stadium, Sentani
17 March 2026
15:30 (UTC+09:00)

Eleven Wise	2–2	PS Yapen
E. Kapisa 51'; Number 11 64'	Report	35' Faller R.; 65' Marten R.

Barnabas Youwe Stadium, Sentani

==== Wednesday, 18 March 2026 ====
18 March 2026
13:30 (UTC+09:00)

Persiker	2–0	Persidafon
F.A.E. Gobang 77'; S.R. Moenda 90+3'	Report

Barnabas Youwe Stadium, Sentani
18 March 2026
15:30 (UTC+09:00)

Nafri	1–2	Persimi
N. Semra 81'	Report	15' J. Insyaf; 61' A. Yawan

Barnabas Youwe Stadium, Sentani

Matchday 3 (22–23 March 2026)

==== Sunday, 22 March 2026 ====
22 March 2026
13:30 (UTC+09:00)

Persidafon	0–3	PS Yapen
	Report	36', 42' B. Atururi; 39' V.P.P. Wayoi

Barnabas Youwe Stadium, Sentani
22 March 2026
15:30 (UTC+09:00)

Waribo	1–2	Nafri
R. Ayeri 7'	Report	52' G. Awi; 73' Lukas P.

Barnabas Youwe Stadium, Sentani

==== Monday, 23 March 2026 ====
23 March 2026
13:30 (UTC+09:00)

Persiweja	2–1	Persimi
A. Yarangga 2'; M.R. Kogoya 10'	Report	27' I. Sayuri

Barnabas Youwe Stadium, Sentani
23 March 2026
15:30 (UTC+09:00)

Eleven Wise	1–2	Persiker
I. Berotabui 87'	Report	13' A. Nabar; 17' A. Yandedai

Barnabas Youwe Stadium, Sentani

Matchday 4 (24–25 March 2026)

==== Tuesday, 24 March 2026 ====
24 March 2026
13:30 (UTC+09:00)

PS Yapen	1–2	Nafri
Paulus P. 37'	Report	6', 45' A. Heluka

Barnabas Youwe Stadium, Sentani
24 March 2026
15:30 (UTC+09:00)

Persidafon	2–0	Waribo
H.L. Wally 13'; S. Ukago 71'	Report

Barnabas Youwe Stadium, Sentani

==== Wednesday, 25 March 2026 ====
25 March 2026
13:30 (UTC+09:00)

Persiker	1–0	Persiweja
A. Msen 57'	Report

Barnabas Youwe Stadium, Sentani
25 March 2026
15:30 (UTC+09:00)

Persimi	1–0	Eleven Wise
J. Insyaf 60' (pen.)	Report

Barnabas Youwe Stadium, Sentani

Matchday 5 (30–31 March 2026)

==== Monday, 30 March 2026 ====
30 March 2026
15:00 (UTC+09:00)

Persiweja	0–3	Persidafon
	Report	17' Smander A.P.; 87' M. Pangkali

Barnabas Youwe Stadium, Sentani
30 March 2026
17:00 (UTC+09:00)

Nafri	2–1	Eleven Wise
G. Awi 4'; Marthinus P. 33' (o.g.)	Report	73' Efraim K.

Barnabas Youwe Stadium, Sentani

==== Tuesday, 31 March 2026 ====
31 March 2026
15:00 (UTC+09:00)

Waribo	0–4	Persiker
	Report	2', 19', 46' J. Amo; 11' A. Yandedai

Barnabas Youwe Stadium, Sentani
31 March 2026
17:00 (UTC+09:00)

PS Yapen	2–0	Persimi
M.M. Raweyai 62'	Report

Barnabas Youwe Stadium, Sentani

Matchday 6 (2 and 4 April 2026)

==== Thursday, 2 April 2026 ====
2 March 2026
15:00 (UTC+09:00)

Persimi	3–1	Waribo
	Report

Barnabas Youwe Stadium, Sentani
3 April 2026
17:00 (UTC+09:00)

Persiker	1–0	PS Yapen
	Report

Barnabas Youwe Stadium, Sentani

==== Saturday, 4 April 2026 ====
4 April 2026
15:00 (UTC+09:00)

Persidafon	0–1	Eleven Wise
	Report

Barnabas Youwe Stadium, Sentani
4 April 2026
17:00 (UTC+09:00)

Persiweja	0–2	Nafri
	Report

Barnabas Youwe Stadium, Sentani

Matchday 7 (6–7 April 2026)

==== Monday, 6 April 2026 ====
6 March 2026
15:00 (UTC+09:00)

Eleven Wise	4–1	Waribo
	Report

Barnabas Youwe Stadium, Sentani
6 April 2026
17:00 (UTC+09:00)

Persiweja	1–1	PS Yapen
R. Kawena 49'	Report	30' V.P.P. Wayoi

Barnabas Youwe Stadium, Sentani

==== Tuesday, 7 April 2026 ====
7 April 2026
15:00 (UTC+09:00)

Persimi	2–3	Persidafon
	Report

Barnabas Youwe Stadium, Sentani
7 April 2026
17:00 (UTC+09:00)

Persiker	1–1	Nafri
Philip S. 78'	Report

Barnabas Youwe Stadium, Sentani

== See also ==
- 2025–26 Liga 4
- 2025–26 Liga 4 Central Papua
- 2025–26 Liga 4 Highland Papua
- 2025–26 Liga 4 South Papua
- 2025–26 Liga 4 Southwest Papua
- 2025–26 Liga 4 West Papua
