= 2017 Liga 3 Papua =

Liga 3 Papua
- Season: 2017

The 2017 Liga 3 Papua (also known as Piala Gubernur Papua 2017) is the third edition of Liga 3 Papua as a qualifying round for the national round of 2017 Liga 3. Persintan Intan Jaya are the defending champions.

The competition scheduled starts on 24 May 2017.

== Teams ==
There are 19 clubs which will participate the league in this season.

Group A
Persidafon Dafonsoro
Emsyk FC
Persiyali Yalimo
Persemar Memberamo Raya
Deiyai Putra FC
Persimer Merauke
Sarmi FC

Group B
Persitoli Tolikara
Oksibil FC
Persilanny Lanny Jaya
Persido Dogiyai
Persimi Sarmi
Persiker Keerom

Group C
Persemi Mimika
Persipani Paniai
Persintan Intan Jaya
Persimap Mappi
Persipuncak Cartenz FC
Persewar Waropen

== First stage ==
=== Group A ===
Pos	Team	Pld	W	D	L	GF	GA	GD	Pts	Qualification
1	Persidafon Dafonsoro (A)	12	8	1	3	23	8	+15	25	Advance to second stage
2	Persimer Merauke (A)	12	8	0	4	27	12	+15	24	Advance to second stage
3	Persemar Mamberamo Raya	12	7	2	3	27	9	+18	23	
4	Deiyai Putra FC	12	7	2	3	25	12	+13	23	
5	Persiyali Yalimo	12	4	2	6	16	11	+5	14	
6	Emsyk FC	12	1	5	6	7	23	−16	8	
7	Sarmi FC	12	0	2	10	7	49	−42	2	

Source: TopSkor
(A) Advance to a further round

=== Group B ===
Pos	Team	Pld	W	D	L	GF	GA	GD	Pts	Qualification
1	Persiker Keerom (A)	10	6	2	2	14	9	+5	20	Advance to second stage
2	Persido Dogiyai (A)	10	6	1	3	21	15	+6	19	Advance to second stage
3	Persitoli Tolikara	10	3	4	3	14	10	+4	13	
4	Persilanny Lanny Jaya	10	3	3	4	12	12	0	12	
5	Persimi Sarmi	10	2	5	3	13	20	−7	11	
6	Oksibil FC	10	2	1	7	15	23	−8	7	

Source: TopSkor
(A) Advance to a further round

=== Group C ===
Pos	Team	Pld	W	D	L	GF	GA	GD	Pts	Qualification
1	Persewar Waropen (A)	10	7	2	1	17	4	+13	23	Advance to second stage
2	Persintan Intan Jaya (A)	10	6	2	2	14	7	+7	20	Advance to second stage
3	Persimap Mappi	10	4	2	4	13	13	0	14	
4	Persipuncak Cartenz FC	10	3	3	4	14	12	+2	12	
5	Persipani Paniai	10	2	2	6	10	27	−17	8	
6	Persemi Mimika	10	2	1	7	5	10	−5	7	

Source: TopSkor
(A) Advance to a further round
