= 2021 Liga 3 Papua =

Tournament details
- Dates: 26 November–20 December 2021
- Teams: 9

Final positions
- Champions: Toli (1st title)
- Runners-up: Persigubin Pegunungan Bintang
- Third place: Persimer Merauke
- Fourth place: Dogiyai

The 2021 Liga 3 Papua was the fourth season of Liga 3 Papua as a qualifying round for the national round of the 2021–22 Liga 3.

Persemi Mimika were the defending champion.

== Teams ==
There was 9 teams participated in the league this season.

| Team | Location |
|---|---|
| Dogiyai | Dogiyai |
| Mamberamo United | Great Mamberamo |
| Persemi Mimika | Mimika |
| Persigubin Pegunungan Bintang | Bintang Mountain Regency |
| Persiker Keerom | Keerom |
| Persimer Merauke | Merauke |
| Persimi Sarmi | Sarmi |
| PS Elang Brimob | Jayapura |
| Toli | Tolikara |

== First round ==
=== Group A ===
| Pos | Team | Pld | W | D | L | GF | GA | GD | Pts | Qualification |
|---|---|---|---|---|---|---|---|---|---|---|
| 1 | Toli | 4 | 3 | 0 | 1 | 9 | 2 | +7 | 9 | Advanced to Second round |
| 2 | Persigubin Pegunungan Bintang | 4 | 2 | 2 | 0 | 12 | 4 | +8 | 8 | Advanced to Second round |
| 3 | PS Elang Brimob | 4 | 2 | 1 | 1 | 6 | 6 | 0 | 7 | Advanced to Second round |
| 4 | Persimi Sarmi | 4 | 1 | 1 | 2 | 8 | 9 | −1 | 4 | |
| 5 | Mamberamo United | 4 | 0 | 0 | 4 | 6 | 20 | −14 | 0 | |

Updated to match(es) played on 8 December 2021. Source: Liga 3 2021 Papua

=== Group B ===
| Pos | Team | Pld | W | D | L | GF | GA | GD | Pts | Qualification |
|---|---|---|---|---|---|---|---|---|---|---|
| 1 | Dogiyai | 3 | 2 | 0 | 1 | 4 | 1 | +3 | 6 | Advanced to Second round |
| 2 | Persimer Merauke | 3 | 1 | 1 | 1 | 3 | 3 | 0 | 4 | Advanced to Second round |
| 3 | Persiker Keerom | 3 | 1 | 1 | 1 | 2 | 3 | −1 | 4 | Advanced to Second round |
| 4 | Persemi Mimika | 3 | 1 | 0 | 2 | 2 | 4 | −2 | 3 | |

Updated to match(es) played on 8 December 2021. Source: Liga 3 2021 Papua
