= 2025–26 Liga 4 Highland Papua =

Liga 4 Highland Papua
- Season: 2025–26
- Dates: 14 February – 8 March 2026
- Champions: Wamena United
- Runner up: Persigubin
- National phase: Wamena United; Persigubin
- Matches: 34
- Goals: 66 (1.94 per match)
- Biggest win: Toli 3–0 Persindug (16 February 2026); Lapago 1–4 Persikimo (18 February 2026); Persigubin 4–1 Lapago (20 February 2026); Ketengban 1–4 Bumi Baliem (23 February 2026)
- Highest scoring: Lapago 1–4 Persikimo (18 February 2026); Persigubin 4–1 Lapago (20 February 2026); Ketengban 1–4 Bumi Baliem (23 February 2026); Bumi Baliem 2–3 Persindug (2 March 2026)
- Longest winning run: Toli (4)
- Longest unbeaten run: Wamena United (7)
- Longest winless run: Lapago (5); Ketengban (5); Persiyali (5)
- Longest losing run: Ketengban (5)

The 2025–26 Liga 4 Highland Papua is the inaugural season of Liga 4 Highland Papua after the change in the structure of Indonesian football competition and serves as a qualifying round for the national phase of the 2025–26 Liga 4. The competition is organised by the Highland Papua Provincial PSSI Association.

== Teams ==
=== Participating teams ===
A total of 12 teams are competing in this season.

No	Team	Location	2024–25 season^{†}
1	Persiyali	Yalimo	—
2	Toli	Tolikara	runners-up
3	Lapago	Jayawijaya	—
4	Wamena United	Jayawijaya	group stage
5	Bumi Baliem	Jayawijaya	3rd place
6	Persikimo	Yahukimo	group stage
7	Persigubin	Bintang Mountains	champions
8	Pamek	Bintang Mountains	—
9	Ketengban	Bintang Mountains	—
10	Persilanny	Lanny Jaya	4th place
11	Persindug	Nduga	group stage
12	Mamteng	Central Mamberamo	group stage

=== Personnel and kits ===
Note: Flags indicate national team as has been defined under FIFA eligibility rules. Players and coaches may hold more than one non-FIFA nationality.

== Schedule ==
The schedule of the competition is as follows.

Stage	Matchday	Date
Group stage	Matches 1–15	14 February – 3 March 2026
Knockout stage	Semi-finals	5 March 2026
Knockout stage	Third place play-off	7 March 2026
Knockout stage	Final	8 March 2026

== Group stage ==
A total of 12 teams will be drawn into two groups of six. The group stage will be played in a home tournament format of single round-robin matches.

The top two teams of each group will qualify for the knockout stage. All matches will be held at Pendidikan Itlay Ikinia Stadium, Wamena.

=== Group A ===
Pos	Team	Pld	W	D	L	GF	GA	GD	Pts	Qualification	KIM	GBN	PAM	LAN	YAL	LAP
1	Persikimo	5	4	1	0	10	3	+7	13	Qualification to the knockout stage		0–0	1–0	2–1		
2	Persigubin	5	3	2	0	8	1	+7	11	Qualification to the knockout stage				0–0		4–1
3	Pamek	5	3	0	2	5	5	0	9			0–3		1–0		
4	Persilanny	5	1	2	2	3	3	0	5						0–0	2–0
5	Persiyali	5	0	2	3	1	6	−5	2		1–3	0–1	0–2			
6	Lapago	5	0	1	4	3	12	−9	1		1–4		1–2		0–0	

Updated to match(es) played on 23 Februari 2026. Source: Liga 4 Highland Papua
Rules for classification: 1) Points; 2) Head-to-head points; 3) Head-to-head goal difference; 4) Head-to-head goals scored; 5) Goal difference; 6) Goals scored; 7) Fair-play points; 8) Draw.

Matches 1–5 (15–19 February 2026)

==== Match 1 ====
15 February 2026
15:00 UTC+9

Lapago	0–0	Persiyali
	Report

Pendidikan Itlay Ikinia Stadium, Wamena

==== Match 2 ====
16 February 2026
15:00 UTC+9

Persikimo	1–0	Pamek
Y.P. Sama 24'	Report

Pendidikan Itlay Ikinia Stadium, Wamena

==== Match 3 ====
17 February 2026
15:00 UTC+9

Persigubin	0–0	Persilanny
	Report

Pendidikan Itlay Ikinia Stadium, Wamena

==== Match 4 ====
18 February 2026
15:00 UTC+9

Lapago	1–4	Persikimo
Y. Asso 62'	Report	15', 35', 60' M.D. Walilo; 53' S.J. Wanena

Pendidikan Itlay Ikinia Stadium, Wamena

==== Match 5 ====
19 February 2026
15:00 UTC+9

Persiyali	0–2	Pamek
	Report	75' Y. Pulalo; 94' H. Yoku

Pendidikan Itlay Ikinia Stadium, Wamena

Matches 6–10 (20–24 February 2026)

==== Match 6 ====
20 February 2026
07:00 UTC+9

Persigubin	4–1	Lapago
E.A.M. Uopmabin 16'; E. Mimin 26'; Y. Irab 46'; R.M. Wenda 79'	Report	21' Y.Y. Kas

Pendidikan Itlay Ikinia Stadium, Wamena

==== Match 7 ====
21 February 2026
07:00 UTC+9

Persilanny	0–0	Persiyali
	Report

Pendidikan Itlay Ikinia Stadium, Wamena

==== Match 8 ====
22 February 2026
15:00 UTC+9

Persikimo	0–0	Persigubin
	Report

Pendidikan Itlay Ikinia Stadium, Wamena

==== Match 9 ====
23 February 2026
15:00 UTC+9

Pamek	1–0	Persilanny
	Report

Pendidikan Itlay Ikinia Stadium, Wamena

==== Match 10 ====
24 February 2026
15:00 UTC+9

Persiyali	0–1	Persigubin
	Report

Pendidikan Itlay Ikinia Stadium, Wamena

Matches 11–15 (25 February–3 March 2026)

==== Match 11 ====
25 February 2026
15:00 UTC+9

Lapago	1–2	Pamek
	Report

Pendidikan Itlay Ikinia Stadium, Wamena

==== Match 12 ====
26 February 2026
07:00 UTC+9

Persikimo	2–1	Persilanny
	Report

Pendidikan Itlay Ikinia Stadium, Wamena

==== Match 13 ====
27 February 2026
07:00 UTC+9

Pamek	0–3	Persigubin
	Report

Pendidikan Itlay Ikinia Stadium, Wamena

==== Match 14 ====
28 February 2026
07:00 UTC+9

Persiyali	1–3	Persikimo
	Report

Pendidikan Itlay Ikinia Stadium, Wamena

==== Match 15 ====
2 March 2026
07:00 UTC+9

Persilanny	2–0	Lapago
	Report

Pendidikan Itlay Ikinia Stadium, Wamena

=== Group B ===
Pos	Team	Pld	W	D	L	GF	GA	GD	Pts	Qualification	TOL	WMU	MMT	NDG	BBL	KTN
1	Toli	5	4	1	0	9	1	+8	13	Qualification to the knockout stage				3–0	2–1	
2	Wamena United	5	2	3	0	4	1	+3	9	Qualification to the knockout stage	0–0		0–0		2–0	
3	Mamteng	5	2	2	1	5	3	+2	8		0–1			1–1		2–1
4	Persindug	5	2	2	1	6	7	−1	8			1–1				1–0
5	Bumi Baliem	5	1	0	4	7	10	−3	3				0–2	2–3		
6	Ketengban	5	0	0	5	2	11	−9	0		0–3	0–1			1–4	

Updated to match(es) played on 1 March 2026. Source: Liga 4 Highland Papua
Rules for classification: 1) Points; 2) Head-to-head points; 3) Head-to-head goal difference; 4) Head-to-head goals scored; 5) Goal difference; 6) Goals scored; 7) Fair-play points; 8) Draw.

Matches 1–5 (16–20 February 2026)

==== Match 1 ====
16 February 2026
07:00 UTC+9

Toli	3–0	Persindug
A. Jikwa 45'; Y. Mambrasar 60', 65'	Report

Pendidikan Itlay Ikinia Stadium, Wamena

==== Match 2 ====
17 February 2026
07:00 UTC+9

Ketengban	0–1	Wamena United
	Report	5' S. Wespa

Pendidikan Itlay Ikinia Stadium, Wamena

==== Match 3 ====
18 February 2026
07:00 UTC+9

Bumi Baliem	0–2	Mamteng
	Report	6' B. Wenda; 69' O. Awi

Pendidikan Itlay Ikinia Stadium, Wamena

==== Match 4 ====
19 February 2026
07:00 UTC+9

Persindug	1–1	Wamena United
A. Heluka 13'	Report	5' B. Murafer

Pendidikan Itlay Ikinia Stadium, Wamena

==== Match 5 ====
20 February 2026
15:00 UTC+9

Ketengban	0–3	Toli
	Report	22' A. Jikwa; 80', 90' S. Binki

Pendidikan Itlay Ikinia Stadium, Wamena

Matches 6–10 (21–26 February 2026)

==== Match 6 ====
21 February 2026
15:00 UTC+9

Mamteng	1–1	Persindug
B. Wenda 2'	Report	57' A. Heluka

Pendidikan Itlay Ikinia Stadium, Wamena

==== Match 7 ====
23 February 2026
07:00 UTC+9

Ketengban	1–4	Bumi Baliem
	Report

Pendidikan Itlay Ikinia Stadium, Wamena

==== Match 8 ====
24 February 2026
07:00 UTC+9

Wamena United	0–0	Mamteng
	Report

Pendidikan Itlay Ikinia Stadium, Wamena

==== Match 9 ====
25 February 2026
07:00 UTC+9

Toli	2–1	Bumi Baliem
	Report

Pendidikan Itlay Ikinia Stadium, Wamena

==== Match 10 ====
26 February 2026
15:00 UTC+9

Persindug	1–0	Ketengban
	Report

Pendidikan Itlay Ikinia Stadium, Wamena

Matches 11–15 (27 February–3 March 2026)

==== Match 11 ====
27 February 2026
15:00 UTC+9

Mamteng	0–1	Toli
	Report

Pendidikan Itlay Ikinia Stadium, Wamena

==== Match 12 ====
28 February 2026
15:00 UTC+9

Wamena United	2–0	Bumi Baliem
R.W. Ekyma 11'; B.M. Rafer 73'	Report

Pendidikan Itlay Ikinia Stadium, Wamena

==== Match 13 ====
1 March 2026
15:00 UTC+9

Mamteng	2–1	Ketengban
	Report

Pendidikan Itlay Ikinia Stadium, Wamena

==== Match 14 ====
2 March 2026
15:00 UTC+9

Bumi Baliem	2–3	Persindug
	Report

Pendidikan Itlay Ikinia Stadium, Wamena

==== Match 15 ====
3 March 2026
07:00 UTC+9

Wamena United	0–0	Toli
	Report

Pendidikan Itlay Ikinia Stadium, Wamena

== Knockout stage ==
The knockout stage will be played as a single match. If tied after regulation time, extra time and, if necessary, a penalty shoot-out will be used to decide the winning team.

=== Bracket ===
Semi-finals
5 March 2026 — Wamena
A1	Persikimo	0
B2	Wamena United	1
6 March 2026 — Wamena
B1	Toli	0
A2	Persigubin	1

Final
8 March 2026 — Wamena
Wamena United	0 (4)
Persigubin	0 (2)
Third place play-off
7 March 2026 — Wamena
Persikimo	0
Toli	1

Semi-finals (5–6 March 2026)

=== Semi-final 1 ===
5 March 2026
14:30 WIT (UTC+9)

Persikimo	0–1	Wamena United
	Report

Pendidikan Itlay Ikinia Stadium, Wamena

=== Semi-final 2 ===
6 March 2026
14:30 WIT (UTC+9)

Toli	0–1	Persigubin
	Report

Pendidikan Itlay Ikinia Stadium, Wamena

3rd place (7 March 2026)

=== Third-place play-off ===
7 March 2026
14:30 WIT (UTC+9)

Persikimo	0–1	Toli
	Report	45'

Pendidikan Itlay Ikinia Stadium, Wamena

Final (8 March 2026)

=== Final ===
8 March 2026
14:30 WIT (UTC+9)

Wamena United	0–0 (a.e.t.)	Persigubin
	Report
Penalties
B. Murafer (penalty scored); player 2 (penalty scored); Rizal (penalty scored); player 4 (penalty scored)	4–2	(penalty scored) R.M. Wenda; (penalty missed) player 2; (penalty scored) player 3; (penalty missed) Jordan

Pendidikan Itlay Ikinia Stadium, Wamena

== See also ==
- 2025–26 Liga 4
- 2025–26 Liga 4 Papua
- 2025–26 Liga 4 Central Papua
- 2025–26 Liga 4 South Papua
- 2025–26 Liga 4 Southwest Papua
- 2025–26 Liga 4 West Papua
