= 2024–25 Liga 4 Highland Papua =

Liga 4 Highland Papua
- Season: 2024–25
- Dates: 22 March – 3 April 2025
- Champions: Persigubin (1st title)
- National phase: Persigubin
- Matches: 16
- Goals: 46 (2.88 per match)
- Biggest win: Bumi Baliem 6–0 Mamteng (22 March 2025)
- Highest scoring: Persindug 1–6 Bumi Baliem (26 March 2025); Mamteng 4–3 Persindug (28 March 2025)
- Longest winless run: 3 games — Persindug
- Longest losing run: 3 games — Persindug

The 2024–25 Liga 4 Highland Papua is the inaugural season of Liga 4 Highland Papua after the change in the structure of Indonesian football competition and serves as a qualifying round for the national phase of the 2024–25 Liga 4. The competition is organised by the Highland Papua Provincial PSSI Association.

== Teams ==
=== Name changes ===
- Persiwa Wamena changed its name to Wamena United as a result of problems with FIFA regarding the previous name.

=== Participating teams ===
A total of 8 teams are competing in this season.

No	Team	Location	2023 season^{†}
1	Toli	Tolikara	7th place
2	Mamteng	Central Mamberamo	—
3	Persilanny	Lanny Jaya	—
4	Bumi Baliem	Jayawijaya	—
5	Wamena United	Jayawijaya	—
6	Persindug	Nduga	—
7	Persikimo	Yahukimo	—
8	Persigubin	Bintang Mountains	—

Notes:

- ^{†}In the 2023 season, despite the split into four provinces, teams from all except South Papua still competed in Liga 3 Papua.

=== Personnel and kits ===
Note: Flags indicate national team as has been defined under FIFA eligibility rules. Players and coaches may hold more than one non-FIFA nationality.

Team	Head coach	Captain	Kit manufacturer	Main kit sponsor	Other kit sponsor(s)
Bumi Baliem	(Indonesia) Oktovianus Maniani		(Indonesia)	None	List: Front: Back: Sleeves: Shorts:
Mamteng	(Indonesia) Titus Bonai		(Indonesia) Mills	Bank Papua	List: Front: Back: Sleeves: Shorts:
Persigubin	(Indonesia) Agung Priatmojo		(Indonesia) Made by club	The Morning Star	List: Front: Back: Yetelas; Sleeves: Shorts:
Persikimo	(Indonesia) Silas Ohee		(Indonesia) Made by club	Bank Papua	List: Front: Back: Yahukimo; Sleeves: Shorts:
Persilanny	(Indonesia) Anis Kogoya		(Indonesia) Made by club		List: Front: Back: Sleeves: Shorts:
Persindug	(Indonesia) Raimon Aiboi		(Germany) Adidas (fake)	Nduga Regency Government	List: Front: Back: Sleeves: Shorts:
Toli	(Indonesia) Thomas Madjar		(Indonesia) Made by club	Walerman the Blues	List: Front: Tolikara Regency Government; Back: Sleeves: Shorts:
Wamena United	(Indonesia) Jimi Iro Saputro		(Indonesia) Made by club	Askab PSSI Jayawijaya	List: Front: Back: Nit Welago, Melo Jaya; Sleeves: Shorts:

== Schedule ==
The schedule of the competition is as follows.

Stage	Matchday	Date
Group stage	Matchday 1	22–24 March 2025
Group stage	Matchday 2	25–26 March 2025
Group stage	Matchday 3	27–28 March 2025
Knockout stage	Semi-finals	30–31 March 2025
Knockout stage	Third place play-off	2 April 2025
Knockout stage	Final	3 April 2025

== Group stage ==
A total of 8 teams will be drawn into two groups of four. The group stage will be played in a home tournament format of single round-robin matches.

The top two teams of each group will qualify for the knockout stage.

=== Group A ===
All matches will be held at Pendidikan Itlay Ikinia Stadium, Wamena.

Pos	Team	Pld	W	D	L	GF	GA	GD	Pts	Qualification	BBL	LAN	MTG	PND
1	Bumi Baliem	3	2	1	0	12	1	+11	7	Qualification to the knockout stage		0–0	6–0	
2	Persilanny	3	2	1	0	6	2	+4	7	Qualification to the knockout stage				2–1
3	Mamteng	3	1	0	2	5	13	−8	3			1–4		4–3
4	Persindug	3	0	0	3	5	12	−7	0		1–6			

Source: Liga 4 Highland Papua
Rules for classification: 1) Points; 2) Head-to-head points; 3) Head-to-head goal difference; 4) Head-to-head goals scored; 5) Goal difference; 6) Goals scored; 7) Fair-play points; 8) Draw.

Group A Matches

Matchday 1 (22 & 24 March)
22 March 2025
14:00 UTC+9

Bumi Baliem	6–0	Mamteng
	Report

Pendidikan Itlay Ikinia Stadium, Wamena
24 March 2025
15:00 UTC+9

Persilanny	2–1	Persindug
	Report

Pendidikan Itlay Ikinia Stadium, Wamena

Matchday 2 (25–26 March)
25 March 2025
07:00 UTC+9

Mamteng	1–4	Persilanny
	Report

Pendidikan Itlay Ikinia Stadium, Wamena
26 March 2025
07:00 UTC+9

Persindug	1–6	Bumi Baliem
	Report

Pendidikan Itlay Ikinia Stadium, Wamena

Matchday 3 (27–28 March)
27 March 2025
07:00 UTC+9

Bumi Baliem	0–0	Persilanny
	Report

Pendidikan Itlay Ikinia Stadium, Wamena
28 March 2025
07:00 UTC+9

Mamteng	4–3	Persindug
	Report

Pendidikan Itlay Ikinia Stadium, Wamena

=== Group B ===
All matches will be held at Pendidikan Itlay Ikinia Stadium, Wamena.

Pos	Team	Pld	W	D	L	GF	GA	GD	Pts	Qualification	PGB	TOL	KIM	WMU
1	Persigubin	3	2	1	0	3	1	+2	7	Qualification to the knockout stage				1–0
2	Toli	3	1	2	0	2	1	+1	5	Qualification to the knockout stage	1–1		1–0	
3	Persikimo	3	1	0	2	2	3	−1	3		0–1			2–1
4	Wamena United	3	0	1	2	1	3	−2	1			0–0		

Source: Liga 4 Highland Papua
Rules for classification: 1) Points; 2) Head-to-head points; 3) Head-to-head goal difference; 4) Head-to-head goals scored; 5) Goal difference; 6) Goals scored; 7) Fair-play points; 8) Draw.

Group B Matches

Matchday 1 (23–24 March)
23 March 2025
15:00 UTC+9

Toli	1–0	Persikimo
	Report

Pendidikan Itlay Ikinia Stadium, Wamena
24 March 2025
07:00 UTC+9

Persigubin	1–0	Wamena United
	Report

Pendidikan Itlay Ikinia Stadium, Wamena

Matchday 2 (25–26 March)
25 March 2025
15:00 UTC+9

Persikimo	0–1	Persigubin
	Report

Pendidikan Itlay Ikinia Stadium, Wamena
26 March 2025
15:00 UTC+9

Wamena United	0–0	Toli
	Report

Pendidikan Itlay Ikinia Stadium, Wamena

Matchday 3 (27–28 March)
27 March 2025
15:00 UTC+9

Toli	1–1	Persigubin
	Report

Pendidikan Itlay Ikinia Stadium, Wamena
28 March 2025
15:00 UTC+9

Persikimo	2–1	Wamena United
	Report

Pendidikan Itlay Ikinia Stadium, Wamena

== Knockout stage ==
The knockout stage will be played as a single match. If tied after regulation time, extra time and, if necessary, a penalty shoot-out will be used to decide the winning team.

=== Bracket ===
Semi-finals
30 March 2025 — Wamena
A1	Bumi Baliem	2
B2	Toli	4
31 March 2025 — Wamena
B1	Persigubin	3
A2	Persilanny	0

Final
3 April 2025 — Wamena
Toli	0 (1)
Persigubin (p)	0 (4)
Third place play-off
2 April 2025 — Wamena
Bumi Baliem	1
Persilanny	0

=== Semi-finals ===
30 March 2025
15:00 WIT (UTC+9)

Bumi Baliem	2–4	Toli
	Report

Pendidikan Itlay Ikinia Stadium, Wamena

31 March 2025
15:00 WIT (UTC+9)

Persigubin	3–0	Persilanny
	Report

Pendidikan Itlay Ikinia Stadium, Wamena

=== Third place play-off ===
2 April 2025
15:00 WIT (UTC+9)

Bumi Baliem	1–0	Persilanny
	Report

Pendidikan Itlay Ikinia Stadium, Wamena

=== Final ===
3 April 2025
15:00 WIT (UTC+9)

Toli	0–0 (a.e.t.)	Persigubin
	Report
Penalties
	1–4

Pendidikan Itlay Ikinia Stadium, Wamena

== See also ==
- 2024–25 Liga 4
- 2024–25 Liga 4 Central Papua
- 2024–25 Liga 4 South Papua
- 2024–25 Liga 4 Southwest Papua
- 2024–25 Liga 4 West Papua
