= 2024–25 Liga 4 South Papua =

Tournament details
- Country: Indonesia
- Venue(s): Katalpal Stadium, Merauke
- Dates: 26 March 2025
- Teams: 6

Final positions
- Champions: Persimer Merauke (1st title)
- Runners-up: Golden FC
- Third place: PS Noterdam
- Fourth place: Persimap Mappi
- Qualification for: Liga 4 national phase

Tournament statistics
- Matches played: 15
- Goals scored: 83 (5.53 per match)

The 2024–25 Liga 4 South Papua was the inaugural edition of the provincial football competition organised by the South Papua Provincial PSSI Association. The winner of the competition qualified for the national phase of the Liga 4 Indonesia as the representative of South Papua province.

The competition was held at Katalpal Stadium in Merauke. Persimer Merauke Lifts the South Papua Liga 4 Trophy After a Heated Duel Against Compatriots.

== Background ==
Liga 4 South Papua was organised as part of the new Indonesian football league structure introduced by PSSI. Participating clubs were required to register through the SIAP (Sistem Informasi dan Administrasi PSSI) online system. Player eligibility included footballers born between 1 January 2002 and 31 December 2006, with an allowance for seven senior players.

Participation in the provincial competition was mandatory for clubs seeking qualification to the national round.

== Teams ==
=== Participating teams ===
A total of six teams participated in the competition:

No	Team	Stadium	Region
1	Persimer Merauke	Katalpal Stadium	Merauke Regency
2	PS Noterdam Merauke	Katalpal Stadium	Merauke Regency
3	Bevak Roman's	Katalpal Stadium	Merauke Regency
4	Golden	Katalpal Stadium	Merauke Regency
5	Persimap Mappi	Katalpal Stadium	Mappi Regency
6	Persibodi Boven Digoel	Asiki Football Field	Boven Digoel Regency

== Standings ==
Pos	Team	Pld	W	D	L	GF	GA	GD	Pts	Qualification
1	Persimer (H)	5	4	1	0	17	9	+8	13	Qualified for National phase
2	Golden	5	3	1	1	16	8	+8	10	
3	PS Noterdam	5	3	1	1	18	8	+10	10	
4	Persimap	5	2	0	3	13	13	0	6	
5	Bevak Roman's	5	1	0	4	13	25	−12	3	
6	Persibodi	5	0	1	4	6	20	−14	1	

Updated to match(es) played on 26 March 2025. Source:
(H) Hosts

== Results ==
Home \ Away	BVK	GOL	BOD	MAP	MER	NOT
Bevak Roman's	—					
Golden		—				
Persibodi			—			
Persimap				—		
Persimer					—	
PS Noterdam						—

Updated to match(es) played on unknown. Source:
Legend: Blue = home team win; Yellow = draw; Red = away team win.

== See also ==
- 2024–25 Liga 4
- 2024–25 Liga 4 Central Papua
- 2024–25 Liga 4 Highland Papua
- 2024–25 Liga 4 Southwest Papua
- 2024–25 Liga 4 West Papua
