= 2023 Liga 3 Papua =

Tournament details
- Country: Indonesia
- Venue: 2
- Dates: 16 November – 17 December 2023
- Teams: 10

Final positions
- Champions: Waanal Brothers (1st title)
- Qualified for: 2022 Liga 3 National phase

Tournament statistics
- Matches played: 45
- Goals scored: 131 (2.91 per match)
- Top goal scorer: Boas Murafer (7 goals)

The 2023 Liga 3 Papua is the sixth edition organized by Asprov PSSI Papua.

This competition was attended by 10 teams from Central Papua Province, Papua Province, and Highland Papua Province. The winner of this competition will advance to the national phase.

Persipani is the defending champion after winning it in the 2022 season.

== Teams ==
Liga 3 Papua this season was attended by 10 teams from 3 provinces. The following is a list of participating teams.

No	Team	Location
Central Papua
1	Persinab	Nabire
2	Persido	Dogiyai
3	Persipani	Paniai
4	Persemi	Mimika
5	Waanal Brothers	Mimika
Papua
6	Biak United	Biak Numfor
7	Persiweja	Mamberamo Raya
8	Persiker	Keerom
Highland Papua
9	Toli	Tolikara
10	Persiyali	Yalimo

== Venues ==
- Mandala Stadium, Jayapura City
- Barnabas Youwe Stadium, Jayapura Regency

== League table ==
Pos	Team	Pld	W	D	L	GF	GA	GD	Pts	Qualification
1	Waanal Brothers (C)	9	7	2	0	22	6	+16	23	Qualified to National Phase
2	Persido	9	5	3	1	16	10	+6	18	
3	Persipani	9	4	4	1	16	10	+6	16	
4	Persinab	9	4	3	2	16	10	+6	15	
5	Persiker	9	3	4	2	12	10	+2	13	
6	Biak United	9	3	3	3	12	9	+3	12	
7	Toli	9	3	0	6	10	15	−5	9	
8	Persiyali	9	2	2	5	10	15	−5	8	
9	Persemi	9	2	1	6	11	25	−14	7	
10	Persiweja	9	1	0	8	6	21	−15	3	

Source: KFF Sport Papua
(C) Champions

== Results ==
Home \ Away	BIK	PMI	DOG	KER	NAB	PAN	PWJ	YAL	TFC	WBM
Biak United	—	—	0–0	—	2–2	—	4–0	2–1	2–0	—
Persemi	1–1	—	—	2–4	—	0–3	2–1	—	—	—
Persido	—	6–2	—	0–0	0–3	3–2	—	—	1–0	—
Persiker	1–0	—	—	—	—	2–2	—	0–0	1–2	—
Persinab	—	3–0	—	1–1	—	—	1–0	—	—	2–3
Persipani	2–1	—	—	—	1–1	—	2–0	—	—	0–0
Persiweja	—	—	1–2	0–1	—	—	—	2–3	2–1	—
Persiyali	—	1–2	1–3	—	1–2	1–1	—	—	—	0–2
Toli	—	2–1	—	—	2–1	2–3	—	1–2	—	0–2
Waanal Brothers	2–0	4–1	1–1	3–2	—	—	5–0	—	—	—

Source: Liga 3 Papua 2023
Legend: Blue = home team win; Yellow = draw; Red = away team win.

Notes:
Based on the results of the Match Coordination Meeting (MCM) 2023 Liga 3 Papua on 15 November 2023. there are several schedule adjustments regarding the match on Sunday morning.

- Persiker v. Toli match previously scheduled for 3 December 2023 at 08.00 WIT at Barnabas Youwe Stadium, has been changed to 13 December 2023 at 15.00 WIT at Barnabas Youwe Stadium.
- Persemi v. Persiker match previously scheduled for 26 November 2023 at 08.00 WIT at Barnabas Youwe Stadium, has been changed to 15 December 2023 at 14.30 WIT at Mandala Stadium.
- Waanal Brothers v. Persemi match previously scheduled for 13 December 2023 at 14.30 WIT at Mandala Stadium, has been changed 13 December 2023 at 15.00 WIT at Mandala Stadium.

== List of goalscorers ==
There have been 79 goals scored in 26 matches, for an average of 3.04 goals per match (as of 1 December 2023).

6 goals

- Boas Murafer (Persinab)

5 goals

- Andrias Kayoi (Persido)
- Dwi Cahyono (Waanal Brothers)

4 goals

- Fransiskus Goo (Persido)
- Sihoem Loho (Persiyali)

3 goals

- Karel Iek (Biak United)
- Agustinus Laukon (Persipani)
- Jhon Wutoy (Persipani)
- Supriyadi Panigfat (Persiweja)

2 goals

- Daniel Wonda (Biak United)
- Krismon Wombaibobo (Persemi)
- Yuspen Uopdana (Persemi)
- Steve Hasor (Persiker)
- Wempi Woppi (Persinab)
- Roberto Sauyai (Persipani)
- Steven Wenda (Persiyali)
- Edgar Awairaro (Toli)
- Bahari Kurniawan (Waanal Brothers)
- Tirie Adriano Manuri (Waanal Brothers)

1 goal

- Abelardo Konowut (Biak United)
- Yesaya Buiney (Biak United)
- Cilvord Waimbo (Persemi)
- Saverius Baopo (Persemi)
- Harry Woisiri (Persido)
- Konstantinus Wojari (Persido)
- Markus Lobo (Persido)
- Nando Tebay (Persido)
- Enol Mimin (Persiker)
- Steven Ohee (Persiker)
- Marlon Naa (Persinab)
- Tonny Rumatrai (Persinab)
- Yotam Malakabu (Persinab)
- Frengki Kayame (Persipani)
- Robi Goo (Persipani)
- Yanpit Nawipa (Persipani)
- Daud Sembra (Persiweja)
- Ferry Munggaruak (Persiweja)
- Selvin Nekwek (Persiyali)
- Soleman Sorabut (Persiyali)
- Renold Walilo (Toli)
- Robby G. Taniyauw (Toli)
- Abdul Rasak Pattiiha (Waanal Brothers)
- Cosmas Karmaka (Waanal Brothers)
- Marsello Buara (Waanal Brothers)
- Pian Sopyan (Waanal Brothers)

== Qualification to the national phase ==
Team	Method of qualification	Date of qualification	Qualified to
Waanal Brothers	2023 Liga 3 Papua champions	12 December 2023	2023-24 Liga 3 National Phase

== See also ==
- 2023–24 Liga 3 National Phase
- 2023 Liga 3 West Papua
- 2023 Liga 3 Maluku
- 2023 Liga 3 North Maluku
