= Fingkreuw =

Fingkreuw is a Papuan surname. Notable people with the surname include:

- Ananias Fingkreuw (born 1992), Indonesian professional footballer
- Korinus Fingkreuw (born 1983), Indonesian professional footballer
