= Atururi =

Atururi is a Papuan surname. Notable people with the surname include:

- Abraham Octavianus Atururi (1951–2019), Indonesian politician
- Boas Atururi (born 1990), Indonesian professional footballer
