= 2025–26 Liga 4 South Papua =

Liga 4 South Papua
- Season: 2025–26
- Dates: 21 February – 3 March 2026
- Champions: Golden
- National phase: Golden
- Matches: 10
- Goals: 41 (4.1 per match)
- All statistics correct as of 20 February 2026.

2025–26 Liga 4 South Papua (also known as the 2026 South Papua Governor's Cup for sponsorship reasons) is the second season of the fourth-tier football competition in Indonesia organized by the Provincial Association (Asprov) of PSSI South Papua. The competition serves as the regional qualifying round to determine the representative for the national phase of the 2025–26 Liga 4.

== Background ==
As a newly established province, South Papua continues to finalize its organizational readiness. Following the Ordinary Congress in December 2025, Asprov PSSI South Papua focused on restructuring the organization and synchronizing the PSSI statutes with national regulations. Preparation for the competition began early with the opening of club registrations through the SIAP PSSI system in late 2025.

To prepare for the tournament, participating clubs—including defending champions Persimer Merauke and Persibodi Boven Digoel—conducted open trials to scout local talent across their respective regencies.

== Teams ==
The following 5 clubs are the official participants of the 2025–26 Liga 4 South Papua, as confirmed by the provincial association:

No	Team	Location	Map	Status
1	Persimer	Merauke Regency		Member
2	PS Noterdam	Merauke Regency		Member
3	Golden	Merauke Regency		Member
4	Persimap	Mappi Regency		Member
5	Persibodi	Boven Digoel Regency		Member

== Match schedule ==
All matches are held at the Katalpal Stadium, Merauke.

Date	Time (WIT)	Match	Result
Saturday, 21 February 2026	15.00	Persimer vs PS Noterdam	2–3
Monday, 23 February 2026	07.30	Golden vs Persimap	6–1
Monday, 23 February 2026	15.00	Persibodi vs Persimer	3–2
Wednesday, 25 February 2026	07.30	Persimap vs Persibodi	2–2
Wednesday, 25 February 2026	15.00	PS Noterdam vs Golden	2–2
Friday, 27 February 2026	07.30	Persimer vs Persimap	1–2
Friday, 27 February 2026	15.00	PS Noterdam vs Persibodi	3–1
Sunday, 1 March 2026	15.00	Golden vs Persimer	3–2
Tuesday, 3 March 2026	07.30	Persibodi vs Golden	1–1
Tuesday, 3 March 2026	07.30	Persimap vs PS Noterdam	1–1

== Venue ==
All matches are held at a centralized venue:

- Katalpal Stadium, Merauke Regency

== Standings ==
The competition is played in a single round-robin tournament format where the top-ranked team will qualify for the national phase of the 2025–26 Liga 4. All matches are held at Katalpal Stadium, Merauke.

Pos	Team	Pld	W	D	L	GF	GA	GD	Pts	Qualification	GFC	NTD	PBD	MAP	PSM
1	Golden	4	2	2	0	12	6	+6	8	Qualification to the National phase				6–1	3–2
2	PS Noterdam	4	2	2	0	9	6	+3	8		2–2		3–1		
3	Persibodi	4	1	2	1	7	8	−1	5		1–1				3–2
4	Persimap	4	1	2	1	6	10	−4	5			1–1	2–2		
5	Persimer	4	0	0	4	7	11	−4	0			2–3		1–2	

Updated to match(es) played on 23 February 2026. Source: Liga 4 Matches
Rules for classification: 1) Points; 2) Head-to-head points; 3) Goal difference; 4) Goals scored.

Match details (21 February – 3 March 2026)
21 February 2026
15:00 UTC+9

Persimer	2–3	PS Noterdam
	Report

Katalpal Stadium, Merauke
23 February 2026
07:30 UTC+9

Golden	6–1	Persimap
	Report

Katalpal Stadium, Merauke
23 February 2026
15:00 UTC+9

Persibodi	3–2	Persimer
	Report

Katalpal Stadium, Merauke
25 February 2026
07:30 UTC+9

Persimap	2–2	Persibodi
	Report

Katalpal Stadium, Merauke
25 February 2026
15:00 UTC+9

PS Noterdam	2–2	Golden
	Report

Katalpal Stadium, Merauke
27 February 2026
07:30 UTC+9

Persimer	1–2	Persimap
	Report

Katalpal Stadium, Merauke
27 February 2026
15:00 UTC+9

PS Noterdam	3–1	Persibodi
	Report

Katalpal Stadium, Merauke
1 March 2026
15:00 UTC+9

Golden	3–2	Persimer
	Report

Katalpal Stadium, Merauke
3 March 2026
07:30 UTC+9

Persibodi	1–1	Golden
	Report

Katalpal Stadium, Merauke
3 March 2026
07:30 UTC+9

Persimap	1–1	PS Noterdam
	Report

Katalpal Stadium, Merauke

== See also ==
- 2025–26 Liga 4
- 2025–26 Liga 4 Papua
- 2025–26 Liga 4 Central Papua
- 2025–26 Liga 4 Highland Papua
- 2025–26 Liga 4 Southwest Papua
- 2025–26 Liga 4 West Papua
