= Wamena United F.C. =

Indonesian football club

Wamena United
- Full name: Wamena United Football Club
- Nicknames: Badai Pegunungan (Highlands Storm); Laskar Hijau Marun (Green and Maroon Warriors)
- Short name: WUFC
- Founded: 16 March 2025; 18 months ago
- Ground: Pendidikan Stadium
- Capacity: 5,000
- Owner: Jayawijaya Regency Government
- League: Liga 4
- 2025–26: Champions (Highland Papua zone)
Home colours	Away colours

Wamena United Football Club, commonly known as Wamena United, is an Indonesian football club based in Wamena, Jayawijaya Regency, Highland Papua. They currently compete in the Liga 4, the fourth tier of the Indonesian football league system. The club represents the Jayawijaya region and plays its home matches at Pendidikan Stadium in Wamena.

== History ==
Wamena United was established in March 2025, following the decline of Persiwa Wamena, one of the historic clubs in Papua. The creation was part of an effort to revive competitive football in the province of Highland Papua and provide a phoenix club for local players in Jayawijaya and surrounding regencies. Ahead of the provincial competition, the Jayawijaya Regency Government expressed support for the club's participation by allocating financial assistance.

In the 2025–26 season, Wamena United participated in the inaugural edition of the Liga 4 Highland Papua provincial competition. The competition involved 12 clubs and was held in Wamena from 14 February to 8 March 2026. Wamena United won the championship after defeating champions Persigubin Bintang Mountains in the final through a penalty shoot-out with a score of 4–2. The victory secured Wamena United the right to represent Highland Papua in the national phase.

== Season-by-season records ==
Season	League	Tier	Tms.	Pos.	Piala Indonesia
2024–25	Liga 4 (Highland Papua)	4	8	4th, Group B	—
2025–26 (provincial phase) (national phase)	Liga 4 (Highland Papua)	4	12	1st	—
2025–26 (provincial phase) (national phase)	Liga 4	4	64	TBD	—

== Honours ==
=== Domestic ===
- Liga 4 Highland Papua
  - Champions (1): 2025–26

== See also ==
- Persiwa Wamena
