= Anis Nabar =

Indonesian footballer

Personal information
- Full name: Yohanis Nabar
- Date of birth: 14 September 1992 (age 34)
- Place of birth: Jayapura, Indonesia
- Height: 1.67 m (5 ft 6 in)
- Position: Winger

Team information
- Current team: Persiker Keerom
- Number: 91

Youth career
- 2011−2012: Persidafon Dafonsoro

Senior career*
| Years | Team | Apps | (Gls) |
| 2012−2013 | Persidafon Dafonsoro | 34 | (6) |
| 2013−2017 | Sriwijaya | 66 | (8) |
| 2018 | Perseru Serui | 32 | (3) |
| 2019 | Persela Lamongan | 6 | (0) |
| 2019 | Sriwijaya | 15 | (3) |
| 2020−2021 | PSMS Medan | 14 | (1) |
| 2022 | Persipura Jayapura | 2 | (0) |
| 2023−2024 | PSBS Biak | 20 | (0) |
| 2024–2025 | Persipura Jayapura | 12 | (1) |
| 2026– | Persiker Keerom | 7 | (1) |

International career
| 2013 | Indonesia U23 | 1 | (0) |
- * Club domestic league appearances and goals as of 7 April 2026

Yohanis Nabar (born 14 September 1992), better known as Anis Nabar, is an Indonesian professional footballer who plays as a winger for Liga 4 club Persiker Keerom.

== Career ==
=== PSMS Medan ===
He was signed for PSMS Medan to play in Liga 2 in the 2020 season. This season was suspended on 27 March 2020 due to the COVID-19 pandemic. The season was abandoned and was declared void on 20 January 2021.

== Honours ==
PSBS Biak

- Liga 2: 2023–24
