= Kelvin Wopi =

Indonesian footballer

Personal information
- Full name: Kelvin Wopi
- Date of birth: 2 March 1995 (age 31)
- Place of birth: Yapen, Indonesia
- Height: 1.72 m (5 ft 8 in)
- Position: Defender

Team information
- Current team: PS Yapen

Senior career*
| Years | Team | Apps | (Gls) |
| 2016–2019 | Perseru Serui | 56 | (0) |
| 2019 | PSIS Semarang | 1 | (0) |
| 2019 | Badak Lampung | 5 | (0) |
| 2020 | Persikabo 1973 | 0 | (0) |
| 2021 | Semen Padang | 6 | (0) |
| 2022 | Persipura Jayapura | 0 | (0) |
| 2026– | PS Yapen | 7 | (2) |
- * Club domestic league appearances and goals as of 7 April 2026

Kelvin Wopi (born 2 March 1995) is an Indonesian professional footballer who plays as a defender for Liga 4 club PS Yapen.

== Club career ==
=== Perseru Serui ===
Kelvin joined Perseru Serui for a match in the 2016 Indonesia Soccer Championship A.
