= Persiweja Kasonaweja =

Indonesian football club

Persiweja
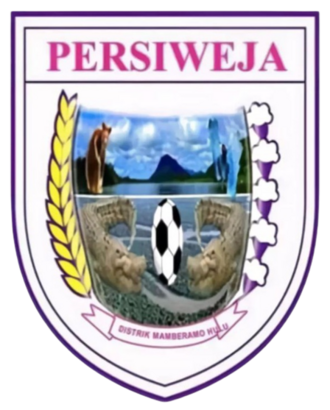
- Full name: Persatuan Sepakbola Indonesia Kasonaweja
- Nickname: Buaya Muara dari Timur (The Saltwater Crocodile from the East)
- Founded: 27 May 2022; 3 years ago
- Ground: Kasonaweja Field
- Owner: PSSI Mamberamo Raya
- Coach: Hamim Punimin
- League: Liga 4
- 2023: 10th
| Home colours | Away colours |

Persatuan Sepakbola Indonesia Kasonaweja, commonly known as Persiweja, is an Indonesian football club based in Kasonaweja, Mamberamo Raya Regency, Papua. The club competes in the Papua provincial zone of Liga 4, one of the lower tiers of the Indonesian football league system.

The club currently competes in Cendrawasih Karsa Liga 4 Papua 2025–26, the Papua provincial zone of Liga 4.

== History ==
Persiweja was officially registered as a member of the Papua Provincial Football Association (Asprov PSSI Papua) on 27 May 2022 during the ordinary congress of the association held in Jayapura.

The club made its first official competition appearance in the 2023 Liga 3 Papua season, which featured several football clubs from across Papua competing in a full league format.

In the 2025–26 season, Persiweja participates in the 2025–26 Cendrawasih Karsa Liga 4 Papua, the provincial qualification competition for Liga 4 clubs in Papua.

== Players ==
=== Current squad ===
As of 19 March 2026

Note: Flags indicate national team as defined under FIFA eligibility rules; some limited exceptions apply. Players may hold more than one non-FIFA nationality.

| No. | Pos. | Nation | Player |
|---|---|---|---|
| 1 | GK | IDN | Febrian |
| 2 | DF | IDN | Makselinu Papara |
| 4 | | IDN | Sarip |
| 6 | MF | IDN | Veri Paulu Ondi Doman |
| 7 | FW | IDN | Fandi Lotar |
| 8 | MF | IDN | Cristian Revaldo |
| 9 | FW | IDN | Festus Alan Marrase |
| 10 | MF | IDN | Herri Wesapla |
| 11 | | IDN | Sosenes Merel |
| 12 | DF | IDN | Wellem |
| 13 | | IDN | Roberto Lay |
| 14 | DF | IDN | Patrias Tong |

| No. | Pos. | Nation | Player |
|---|---|---|---|
| 16 | | IDN | Pilipus Abiasit |
| 17 | FW | IDN | Unknown |
| 18 | | IDN | Frengki Tibotai |
| 19 | | IDN | Piter Hikajari |
| 20 | GK | IDN | Yudhistira Satria Pratama |
| 22 | | IDN | Ibrahim Seido |
| 23 | DF | IDN | Uskak David Wilyam Sokoy |
| 24 | | IDN | Ronald Kawena |
| 27 | | IDN | Imanuel Albert Baay |

== Coaching staff ==
| Name | Nationality | Season |
|---|---|---|
| Mial Armand | Indonesia | 2021 |
| Hamim Punimin | Indonesia | 2026– |

The club is currently managed by Hamim Punimin. Under his leadership, Persiweja focuses on harnessing local talent from the Mamberamo Raya Regency to compete in the regional tiers of the Indonesian football league system.

Punimin's role is pivotal in maintaining the club's competitive edge and ensuring the tactical development of the squad as they represent the Mamberamo Raya Regency.

== Season-by-season records ==
=== Records ===
| Season | League | | | | | | | | | Piala Indonesia |
| Season | Comp. | App. | W | D | L | GF | GA | Pts. | Pos. | Piala Indonesia |
|---|---|---|---|---|---|---|---|---|---|---|
| 2023–24 | Liga 3 (Papua) | 9 | 1 | 0 | 8 | 6 | 21 | 3 | 10th | not held |
| 2025–26 | Liga 4 (Papua) | 7 | 2 | 2 | 3 | 6 | 9 | 8 | 7th | not held |

| Champion | Runner-up | Promotion | Relegation |

=== Season-by-season ===
| Season(s) | Tier | Division | Place | Piala Indonesia |
|---|---|---|---|---|
| 2023–24 | 3 | L3 | eliminated in provincial phase | — |
| 2025–26 | 4 | L4 | eliminated in provincial phase | — |

- 1 season in Liga 4
- 1 seasons in Liga 3 (defunct)

== See also ==
- Liga 4 (Indonesia)
- 2025–26 Liga 4 Papua
- 2023 Liga 3 Papua
