= Marora Stadium =

Stadium in Papua

- Interactive map of Marora Stadium
- Location: Mariadei Street, Serui, Yapen Islands Regency, Papua, Indonesia
- Coordinates: 1°52′47″S 136°13′40″E
- Owner: Yapen Islands Regency Government
- Operator: PS Yapen
- Capacity: 5,000
- Surface: Grass
- Field size: 112×64m

Tenants
- PS Yapen; Perseru Serui (formerly)

Marora Stadium (Indonesian: Stadion Marora) is the main sports venue of Yapen Islands Regency in the province of Papua, Indonesia. It has a maximum seating capacity of 5,000.
