= Krismon Wombaibobo =

Indonesian footballer

Personal information
- Full name: Krismon Gustap Wombaibobo
- Date of birth: 16 May 1998 (age 28)
- Place of birth: Serui, Indonesia
- Height: 1.63 m (5 ft 4 in)
- Position: Midfielder

Team information
- Current team: Persemi Mimika
- Number: 9

Senior career*
Years	Team	Apps	(Gls)
2017	Yahukimo	11	(0)
2018–2019	Persewar Waropen	17	(4)
2020	Badak Lampung	1	(1)
2021	Semen Padang	9	(0)
2022–2023	PSBS Biak	4	(0)
2023–	Persemi Mimika	2	(1)
- * Club domestic league appearances and goals as of 22 November 2023

Krismon Gustap Wombaibobo (born 16 May 1998) is an Indonesian professional footballer who plays as a midfielder for Liga 3 club Persemi Mimika.

== Club career ==
=== Yahukimo ===
He was signed for Yahukimo to play in Liga 2 on 2017.

=== Persewar Waropen ===
Krismon joined the Persewar Waropen club in the 2018. Krismon scored 4 goals in the 2019 season when Persewar played in the second division.

=== Badak Lampung ===
Krismon joined the Badak Lampung club in the 2020 and made his debut on 15 March 2020 in a match against PSKC Cimahi. This season was suspended on 27 March 2020 due to the COVID-19 pandemic. The season was abandoned and was declared void on 20 January 2021.

=== Semen Padang ===
In 2021, Krismon signed a contract with Indonesian Liga 2 club Semen Padang. He made his league debut on 6 October against PSPS Riau at the Gelora Sriwijaya Stadium, Palembang.
