= Toli F.C. =

Indonesian football club

Toli FC
- Full name: Tolikara Football Club
- Nickname: Walerman Si Biru (Walerman The Blues)
- Founded: 9 January 2003; 23 years ago, as Persitoli Tolikara; 2020; 6 years ago, as Toli FC
- Ground: Pendidikan Stadium; Wamena, Highland Papua
- Capacity: 10,000
- Owner: Tolikara Government
- Chairman: Usman G. Wanimbo
- Coach: Thomas Madjar
- League: Liga 4
- 2023: 7th of 10
Home colours	Away colours

Active departments of Toli FC
Football	Football (Women's)

Tolikara Football Club or Toli FC (formerly known as Persitoli Tolikara) is an Indonesian football club based in Tolikara, Highland Papua. Club played in Liga 4.

On 9 November 2020, Persitoli Tolikara officially rename to Toli FC, along with the launch of its new logo which took place at the Grand Alison Sentani Hotel, Jayapura Regency.

Persitoli stadium named Pendidikan Stadium. Its location was in downtown Wamena, Papua.

== Honours ==
- Liga 3 Papua
  - Champion (1): 2021
- Liga 4 Highland Papua
  - Runner-up (1): 2024–25

== Coaches ==
Name	Nat.	Year(s)
Bio Paulin	(Indonesia)	2021–2022
Thomas Madjar	(Indonesia)	2025–
