= Ananias Fingkreuw =

Indonesian association football player

Personal information
- Full name: Ananias Fingkreuw
- Date of birth: 11 October 1992 (age 34)
- Place of birth: Jayapura, Indonesia
- Height: 1.75 m (5 ft 9 in)
- Position: Forward

Team information
- Current team: Persiker Keerom
- Number: 76

Youth career
- Persipura Jayapura

Senior career*
Years	Team	Apps	(Gls)
2015	PSBL Langsa	32	(6)
2015–2016	Persipur Purwodadi	9	(2)
2016–2017	PSPS Pekanbaru	5	(5)
2017	PSIR Rembang	7	(0)
2017–2018	Semen Padang	2	(0)
2018–2019	Madura	7	(0)
2019	PSBS Biak	6	(4)
2020	PSMS Medan	0	(0)
2021–2022	PSBS Biak	6	(1)
2026–	Persiker Keerom	7	(0)
- * Club domestic league appearances and goals as of 7 April 2026

Ananias Fingkreuw (born 11 October 1992) is an Indonesian professional footballer who plays as a forward for Liga 4 club Persiker Keerom.

== Club career ==
Fingkreuw started his career in the Persipura Jayapura's junior team. Then he joined several teams at different levels of competition, from Persemi Mimika, PS Siak, Persiju Sijunjung, PSIR Rembang, and PSBL Langsa.

He who has started his professional career then played at Semen Padang in 2018, PSBS Biak and Madura in 2019, until finally in 2020, he joined PSMS Medan in the 2020 Liga 2.

=== PSMS Medan ===
He was signed for PSMS Medan to play in Liga 2 in the 2020 season. This season was suspended on 27 March 2020 due to the COVID-19 pandemic. The season was abandoned and was declared void on 20 January 2021.

=== Return to PSBS Biak ===
He was signed for PSBS Biak to play in Liga 2 in the 2021 season. Fingkreuw made his league appearance on 7 October 2021, coming on as a starter in a 1–1 draw against Mitra Kukar at the Tuah Pahoe Stadium. On 20 October 2021, Fingkreuw scored his first goal for PSBS against Sulut United in the 66th minute from the penalty at the Tuah Pahoe Stadium, Palangkaraya.
