= PS Yapen =

Indonesian football club

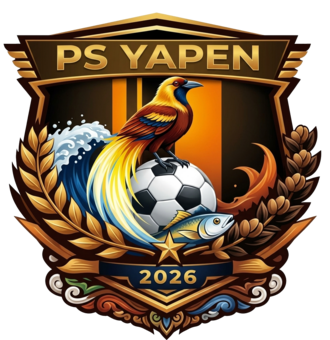
- Full name: Persatuan Sepakbola Yapen
- Nicknames: Orange Bird of Paradise; The Black Orange
- Founded: 6 March 2026; 4 months ago
- Ground: Marora Stadium
- Capacity: 5,000
- Owner: Yapen Islands Regency Government
- Coach: Hans Mamoribo
- League: Liga 4
- 2025–26: not started yet
Home colours

Persatuan Sepakbola Yapen, commonly known as PS Yapen, is an Indonesian football club based in Yapen Islands Regency, Papua, Indonesia. The club currently competes in the 2025–26 Cendrawasih Karsa Liga 4 Papua, the Papua provincial zone of Liga 4.

The club was established in 2026 and officially launched by the Yapen Islands Regency Government to represent the region in national football competitions several years since the relocation of Perseru Serui to Lampung.

PS Yapen plays its home matches at Marora Stadium in Serui.

== History ==
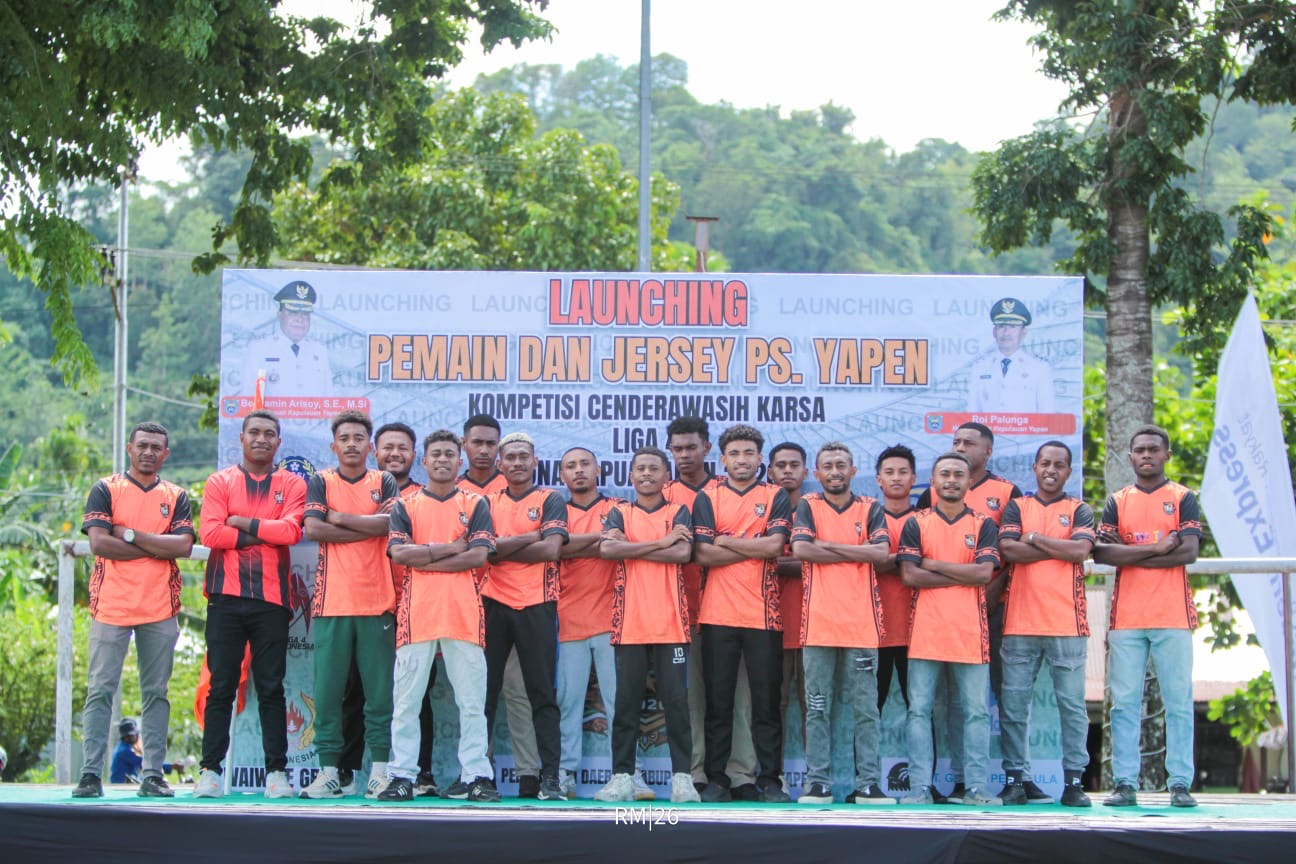
PS Yapen jersey introduced during the club launching event in Serui.

PS Yapen was officially inaugurated on 6 March 2026 at Trikora Square in Serui during the 57th anniversary celebration of Yapen Islands Regency.

The establishment of the club was part of an initiative by the local government to revive professional football in Yapen Islands after the relocation and license sale of Perseru Serui. The team was formed largely from players selected during the U-23 Regent's Cup tournament held in early 2026.

Ahead of the 2025–26 Liga 4 season in the Papua zone, the team intensified preparations through training sessions and squad development programs.

The club also received support from regional political leaders, including the chairman of the Papua Regional People's Representative Council, who publicly expressed support for the team’s participation in Liga 4.

PS Yapen made its competitive debut in the Cendrawasih Karsa Liga 4 Papua 2025–26, the provincial qualifying competition for Liga 4 in Papua. The tournament features several clubs from across the province and is broadcast live through the Cendrawasih Karsa YouTube channel.

== Stadium ==
PS Yapen plays its home matches at Marora Stadium in Serui, which serves as the main football venue in Yapen Islands Regency.

== Colours and kits ==
The club’s primary kit features an orange jersey with black shorts and orange socks. The colours are used as the main identity of the club.

== Players ==
As of 24 March 2026.

Note: Flags indicate national team as defined under FIFA eligibility rules; some limited exceptions apply. Players may hold more than one non-FIFA nationality.

No.	Pos.	Nation	Player
2	DF	IDN	Hendrik B.
4	DF	IDN	Alex M.
5	DF	IDN	Faller R.
7	MF	IDN	Jhon Felix Rewang
8	MF	IDN	Alessandro Brian Masoka
9	FW	IDN	Corneles M.
10	MF	IDN	Vichram W.
13	MF	IDN	Frans Daud Ayawaeni
14	FW	IDN	Juanitho Micky M. Samori
17	MF	IDN	Paulus P.
19	MF	IDN	Yance Gatuso Burumi

No.	Pos.	Nation	Player
20	GK	IDN	Valentino R. Payawa
21	MF	IDN	Oni Philip Koromat
23	FW	IDN	Yanto Toni Warkawani
26	DF	IDN	Anton P.
27	MF	IDN	Ali Tahir
29	GK	IDN	Hervando
30	GK	IDN	Yohanis Wihyawari
88	MF	IDN	Daniel P.
89	MF	IDN	Marten R. (captain)
95	DF	IDN	Kelvin W.

== Coaching staff ==
The club is currently managed by Hans Mamoribo, who was appointed following the club's official launch on 6 March 2026, coinciding with the 57th anniversary of Yapen Islands Regency.

Under Mamoribo's leadership, PS Yapen has strategically integrated seven experienced senior players to mentor a squad largely composed of young local talents selected from the 2026 U-23 Regent's Cup (Bupati Cup). The most notable addition is the veteran defender and captain, Boas Atururi, whose professional experience with clubs like Semen Padang and Perseru Serui is expected to be a cornerstone for the team's ambition in the 2025–26 Liga 4 Papua season.

Position	Name	Ref.
Head coach	(Indonesia) Hans Mamoribo	

== Season-by-season records ==
=== Records ===
Season	League									Piala Indonesia
Season	Comp.	App.	W	D	L	GF	GA	Pts.	Pos.	Piala Indonesia
2025–26	Liga 4 (Papua)	7	3	2	2	12	7	11	4th	not held

Champion	Runner-up	Promotion	Relegation

=== Season-by-season ===
Season(s)	Tier	Division	Place	Piala Indonesia
2025–26	4	L4	eliminated in provincial phase	—

- 1 season in Liga 4

== See also ==
- 2025–26 Liga 4 Papua
- Perseru Serui
- Liga 4 (Indonesia)
