= Golden F.C. =

Golden
- Full name: Golden Football Club
- Nicknames: Angin Selatan (The Southern Winds); Walabi lincah (The Agile Wallabies)
- Founded: 2025; 1 year ago
- Ground: Katalpal Stadium
- Capacity: 10,000
- Manager: Lotan Sewang
- League: Liga 4
- 2025–26: Champions, Liga 4 South Papua
Home colours	Away colours

Golden Football Club, commonly known as Golden, is an Indonesian football club based in Merauke Regency, South Papua. The club currently competes in Liga 4, the fourth tier of the Indonesian football league system.

The club plays its home matches at Katalpal Stadium in Merauke.

== History ==
Golden emerged as one of the competitive clubs in South Papua following the establishment of the provincial football structure under the PSSI provincial association. The club participates in regional competitions organized by the South Papua Football Association and represents Merauke Regency in provincial competitions.

In the 2025–26 season, Golden won the 2025–26 Liga 4 South Papua (also known as the 2025–26 Liga 4 South Papua Governor's Cup). The club secured the title after finishing the competition with the highest goal productivity, scoring 12 goals and conceding six throughout the tournament.

The decisive match saw Golden draw 1–1 against Persibodi Boven Digoel, a result that ensured the club finished at the top of the standings and qualified for the national phase of the 2025–26 Liga national phase representing South Papua.

The competition was held at Katalpal Stadium in Merauke and involved teams from several regencies in South Papua, including Merauke, Boven Digoel, and Mappi.

== Players ==
As of 22 February 2026

Note: Flags indicate national team as defined under FIFA eligibility rules; some limited exceptions apply. Players may hold more than one non-FIFA nationality.

No.	Pos.	Nation	Player
—	GK	IDN	Fransiskus Komon
—	GK	IDN	Gilbert Pais
—	GK	IDN	Gerson Piri
—	DF	IDN	Iqbal Taufiqqurahman
—	DF	IDN	Jhosua Niwar
—	DF	IDN	Rustam Riyatno
—	DF	IDN	Calvin Renyaan
—	DF	IDN	Yakobus Wamin
—	DF	IDN	Musa Saman
—	DF	IDN	Randy Apot
—	DF	IDN	Rully Kukumbo
—	DF	IDN	Aris
—	DF	IDN	Vicko
—	MF	IDN	Daniel F. Marthen

No.	Pos.	Nation	Player
—	MF	IDN	Marvin H.T.
—	MF	IDN	Petrus Pisakai
—	MF	IDN	Emanuel
—	MF	IDN	Yohanis Urop
—	MF	IDN	Petrus Renel
—	MF	IDN	Caspar Charlo
—	MF	IDN	Jhon Boby
—	FW	IDN	Marinus Nongsanem
—	FW	IDN	Karolus Nongsanem
—	FW	IDN	Apoldus Ricardo
—	FW	IDN	Steven
—	FW	IDN	Alviian T.
—	FW	IDN	Juan Urop

== Honours ==
=== Regional competitions ===
- Liga 4 South Papua
  - Champion (1): 2025–26
