= Persigubin Bintang Mountains =

Indonesian football club

Persigubin
- Full name: Persatuan Sepakbola Indonesia Pegunungan Bintang
- Nicknames: The Orange and Grey; The Morning Star
- Founded: 20 November 2003; 22 years ago
- Ground: Kabiding Football Field
- Capacity: 1,000
- Owner: PSSI Bintang Mountains
- Chairman: Kris Uropmabin
- Head coach: Agung D. Atmojo
- League: Liga 4
- 2024–25: 1st (Highland Papua zone); Second round, 3rd in Group W (National phase)
Home colours	Away colours

Persatuan Sepakbola Indonesia Pegunungan Bintang (simply known as Persigubin) is an Indonesian football club based in Bintang Mountains Regency, Highland Papua. The club plays in the Liga 4 Highland Papua zone.

== Honours ==
- Liga 3 Papua
  - Runner-up (1): 2021
- Liga 4 Highland Papua
  - Champion (1): 2024–25
  - Runner-up (1): 2025–26
