= Barnabas Youwe Stadium =

Stadium in Papua, Indonesia

- Interactive map of Barnabas Youwe Stadium
- Location: Sentani, Jayapura Regency, Papua, Indonesia
- Coordinates: 2°34′19″S 140°31′25″E
- Owner: Government of Jayapura Regency
- Operator: Government of Jayapura Regency
- Capacity: 15,000

Tenant
- Persidafon Dafonsoro

Barnabas Youwe Stadium is a multi-purpose stadium in Jayapura Regency, Papua, Indonesia. It is mainly used mostly for football matches. The stadium has a capacity of 15,000 spectators.
