= Persidafon Dafonsoro =

Indonesian football club

Persidafon
- Full name: Persatuan Sepakbola Indonesia Dafonsoro
- Nicknames: Gabus Sentani (Sentani Sawfish)
- Founded: 1970; 56 years ago
- Ground: Barnabas Youwe Stadium; Jayapura Regency, Papua
- Capacity: 15,000
- Owner: PT. Ananda Jaya Perkasa
- Chairman: Habel Melkias Suwae
- League: Liga 4
- 2025-26: Group Stage (Papua zone)
Home colours	Away colours

Persatuan Sepakbola Indonesia Dafonsoro, commonly known as Persidafon, is an Indonesian football club based in Jayapura Regency, Papua. The club was founded in 1970. The traditional team home kit is a black and white striped shirt that resembles the Juventus shirt. They currently compete in the Liga 4 and their home stadium is Barnabas Youwe Stadium.

The club is named after the Dafonsoro Mountains (also known as Cyclops Mountains) in Jayapura Regency.

== Players ==
=== Current squad ===
As of 24 March 2026

Note: Flags indicate national team as defined under FIFA eligibility rules; some limited exceptions apply. Players may hold more than one non-FIFA nationality.

No.	Pos.	Nation	Player
1	GK	IDN	Samuel Mahuze
2	DF	IDN	Napolion Yeuw
3	DF	IDN	Abrahan Benuki Imbiri
4	DF	IDN	Persy Alexander
5	MF	IDN	Tagi Daniel Tabuni
6	DF	IDN	Goodmer Jeremaya Meho
8	FW	IDN	Yosua F. P.
10	MF	IDN	Tiro Wonda (captain)
11	FW	IDN	Ignasius Dala
14	FW	IDN	Jason
15	MF	IDN	Moses Pangkali
17	MF	IDN	Kristian Tomi Deda

No.	Pos.	Nation	Player
18	DF	IDN	Adriano Mier
19	FW	IDN	Alvredho Mesack Tokoro
20	GK	IDN	Roland I. Salay
21	FW	IDN	Marten F. Ruly Miriauw
23	FW	IDN	Ronal Manggaprouw
26	MF	IDN	Samuel Ukago
27	MF	IDN	Smander A.P.
28	DF	IDN	Kris Kores Monim
29	DF	IDN	Joe Ogi
30	MF	IDN	Herto L. Wally

== Manager ==
The team is currently managed by Gerald R. Pangkali. A prominent figure in Indonesian football, Pangkali is widely recognized for his long-standing career as a versatile midfielder in the top flight of the Indonesian league system, most notably with Persipura Jayapura.

His transition into coaching with Persidafon Dafonsoro brings a wealth of tactical experience and leadership to the squad. His appointment is seen as a strategic move to utilize his deep understanding of Papuan football culture to mentor and develop the club's local talent.

== Season-by-season records ==
Season	League/Division	Tms.	Pos.	Piala Indonesia
1994–95	First Division	16	First round	–
1995–96	First Division	24	3rd, Second round	–
1996–97	First Division	20	4th, Second round	–
1997–98	First Division	season abandoned		–
1998–99	First Division	19	5th, Group 4	–
1999–2000	First Division	21	4th, Second round	–
2001	First Division	23	6th, Group 4	–
2002	Second Division		Second round	–
2003	Second Division			–
2004	Second Division	41	4th, Second round	–
2005	First Division	27	Relegation play-off winner	–
2006	First Division	36	7th, Group 4	–
2007	First Division	40	7th, Group 4	–
2008–09	First Division	48	3	–
2009–10	Premier Division	33	3rd, Second round	–
2010–11	Premier Division	39	Promotion/relegation play-off winner	–
2011–12	Indonesia Super League	18	10	–
2013	Indonesia Super League	18	16	–
2014	Premier Division	63	Withdrew	–
2015				
2016
2017	Liga 3	32	Eliminated in provincial round	–
2018	Liga 3	32	Eliminated in provincial round	–
2019	Liga 3	32	Eliminated in provincial round	–
2020	Liga 3	season abandoned		–
2021–22				
2022–23	Liga 3	–	Eliminated in provincial round	–
2023–24				
2024–25				
2025–26	Liga 4	-	-	-
