= Persimer Merauke =

Indonesian football club

Persimer
- Full name: Persatuan Sepakbola Indonesia Merauke
- Nicknames: Rusa Merauke; Laskar Gerbang Timur Nusantara
- Ground: Katalpal Stadium; Merauke, South Papua, Indonesia
- Capacity: 15,000
- Owner: PSSI Merauke Regency
- Chairman: Charles Gomar
- Coach: Oktavianus Maniani
- League: Liga 4
- 2024–25: 1st (South Papua zone); Second round, 4th in Group V (National phase)
Home colours	Away colours

Persatuan Sepaknola Indonesia Merauke (simply known as Persimer) is an Indonesian football club based in Merauke Regency, South Papua, Indonesia. They currently compete in Liga 4 South Papua zone.

== Honours ==
- Liga 3 Papua
  - Third-place (1): 2021
- Liga 4 South Papua
  - Champion (1): 2024–25
