= Boas Atururi =

Indonesian footballer

Personal information
- Full name: Boas Atururi
- Date of birth: 21 August 1990 (age 36)
- Place of birth: Yapen, Indonesia
- Height: 1.65 m (5 ft 5 in)
- Position: Left-back

Team information
- Current team: PS Yapen

Senior career*
Years	Team	Apps	(Gls)
2010–2016	Perseru Serui	63	(1)
2017	Semen Padang	11	(0)
2018	Persipura Jayapura	15	(0)
2019	Semen Padang	17	(0)
2020–2021	Persewar Waropen	3	(0)
2026–	PS Yapen	7	(2)
- * Club domestic league appearances and goals as of 7 April 2026

Boas Atururi (born 21 August 1990) is an Indonesian professional footballer who plays as a left-back for Liga 4 club PS Yapen.

== Club career ==
=== Semen Padang ===
In 2019, Boas Atururi signed a one-year contract with Indonesian Liga 1 club Semen Padang.

=== Persewar Waropen ===
Atururi joined the Persewar Waropen club in the 2020 Liga 2. This season was suspended on 27 March 2020 due to the COVID-19 pandemic. The season was abandoned and was declared void on 20 January 2021.
