= Persimi Sarmi =

Indonesian football club

Persimi
- Full name: Persatuan Sepakbola Indonesia Sarmi
- Nicknames: Badai Pantai Utara (North Coast Storm); Mutiara Sarmi (Pearl of Sarmi)
- Founded: 2002; 24 years ago
- Ground: Merdeka Field; Sarmi, Papua
- Owner: PSSI Sarmi Regency
- Manager: Nico Dimo
- Coach: Lukas Mandowen
- League: Liga 4
- 2025-26: Group Stage (Papua zone)
| Home colours | Away colours |

Persatuan Sepakbola Indonesia Sarmi (simply known as Persimi Sarmi or Persimi) is an Indonesian football club based in Sarmi, Sarmi Regency, Papua. They currently compete in the Liga 4 Papua zone.

== Players ==
=== Current squad ===
As of 18 March 2026

Note: Flags indicate national team as defined under FIFA eligibility rules; some limited exceptions apply. Players may hold more than one non-FIFA nationality.

| No. | Pos. | Nation | Player |
|---|---|---|---|
| 1 | GK | IDN | Frans Kasse |
| 2 | FW | IDN | Absalom Maukailele |
| 3 | DF | IDN | Agusto Insyaf |
| 4 | DF | IDN | Marselino Insyaf |
| 5 | DF | IDN | Dendis Numbre |
| 6 | | IDN | David Bwefar |
| 7 | FW | IDN | Arjen Yawan |
| 8 | FW | IDN | Larsson Imbiri |
| 9 | | IDN | Kaliopas Wabrar |

| No. | Pos. | Nation | Player |
|---|---|---|---|
| 11 | | IDN | Berlin Wakum |
| 12 | MF | IDN | Moses Catue |
| 13 | | IDN | Habel Weppe |
| 14 | | IDN | Berlin Weiraso |
| 15 | MF | IDN | Landrik Kabey |
| 16 | DF | IDN | Justiyanto Insyaf |
| 17 | DF | IDN | Riki Wasis |
| 19 | | IDN | Anthonio Yaas |
| 20 | | IDN | Askenas Mamnin |
| 21 | | IDN | Jimmy Weyasu |

== Manager ==
The team is currently managed by Lukas Mandowen, a former forward best known for his career at Persipura Jayapura.

== Honours ==
- Liga Indonesia Third Division
  - Third-place (1): 2006

== Supporter ==
Persimi Mania is supporter of Persimi Sarmi.
