= Pendidikan Stadium =

Football stadium in Indonesia

- Itlay Ikina Stadium
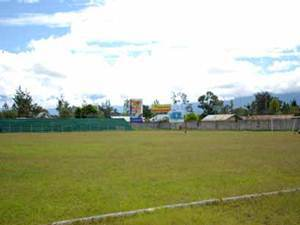
- Interactive map of Pendidikan Stadium
- Location: Wamena, Jayawijaya Regency, Highland Papua, Indonesia
- Coordinates: 4.099473°S 138.948319°E
- Owner: Government of Jayawijaya Regency
- Operator: Government of Jayawijaya Regency
- Capacity: 5,000
- Surface: Grass

Tenants
- Wamena United (2025–); Persiwa Wamena (formerly)

Pendidikan Stadium, also known as Itlay Ikina Stadium, is a multi-use stadium in Wamena, Indonesia. It is currently used mostly for football matches, as the home stadium of Wamena United. The stadium has a capacity of 5,000 people.
