= Persiker Keerom =

Indonesian football club

Persiker
- Full name: Persatuan Sepakbola Indonesia Keerom
- Nicknames: Badai Perbatasan (Frontier Storm)
- Founded: 2014; 12 years ago
- Ground: Swakarsa Mini Stadium; Keerom, Papua
- Capacity: 500
- Owner: PSSI Keerom Regency
- Coach: Elie Aiboy
- League: Liga 4
- 2025–26: Champions (Papua zone)
Home colours	Away colours

Persatuan Sepakbola Indonesia Keerom (simply known as Persiker Keerom or Persiker) is an Indonesian football club based in Keerom Regency, Papua. They currently compete in the Liga 4.

== Supporter ==
Keeromania are supporters of Persiker Keerom. Their supporters are based primarily in Keerom Regency and nearby urban areas, such as Jayapura City.

== Players ==
=== Current squad ===
As of 23 March 2026

Note: Flags indicate national team as defined under FIFA eligibility rules; some limited exceptions apply. Players may hold more than one non-FIFA nationality.

No.	Pos.	Nation	Player
3	DF	IDN	Rohdrigo C. Wellip
5		IDN	Michael Kores Twenty
6	MF	IDN	Yenambel Jos Fonataba
11	MF	IDN	Okristiano R. Karayopi
12		IDN	Fahri Adi Excobar Gobang
13	DF	IDN	Fredi B.
14		IDN	Herry Paul Naap
15		IDN	Apriliano Anderson Tukayo
17	MF	IDN	Aldriansa F. Yandedai
18		IDN	Ganang Cipta Komala
19	DF	IDN	Rudhy Saputra

No.	Pos.	Nation	Player
21		IDN	Alfredo Fredrik Korwa
22	DF	IDN	Habil Barokah
23	FW	IDN	Marlos Samai
24	DF	IDN	Jeperson R.
26		IDN	Agustinus Kelai
27		IDN	Rudi Kuur
29		IDN	Stiberius Ronaldo Moenda
31	GK	IDN	Andika
44	DF	IDN	Yohanis Tjoe
76	FW	IDN	Ananias Fingkreuw
78	MF	IDN	Pilipus Sibetai
91	MF	IDN	Anis Nabar (captain)
98	GK	IDN	Nikolas Apolos Youwe

== Honours ==
- Liga 4 Papua
  - Champion (1): 2025–26
