= Andalas derby =

Indonesian football derby

- Other names: Super Sumatra derby
- Location: Sumatra
- Teams: Semen Padang; Sriwijaya
- First meeting: 6 February 2011; Indonesia Super League; Sriwijaya 5–0 Semen Padang
- Latest meeting: 26 November 2023; Liga 2 Semen Padang 3–0 Sriwijaya
- Stadiums: Gelora Haji Agus Salim Stadium (Semen Padang); Gelora Sriwijaya Stadium (Sriwijaya)

Statistics
- Total meetings: 16
- Most wins: Both (4 wins each)
- All-time series: Semen Padang: 4 Draw: 8 Sriwijaya: 4
- Largest victory: 6 February 2011; Indonesia Super League; Sriwijaya 5–0 Semen Padang (2011)
- Longest unbeaten streak: 5 matches Sriwijaya (2017–2023)

The Andalas derby (Indonesian: Derbi Andalas), also known as the Super Sumatra derby (Indonesian: Derbi Super Sumatera), is the name given to inter-city rivalry between Indonesian professional football clubs Semen Padang and Sriwijaya. Semen Padang was founded in 1980 in Padang, West Sumatra, while Sriwijaya is based in Palembang, South Sumatra since it was founded in 2004. The "Andalas" is another name for Sumatra, and is used to refer the island.

== Origins ==
Both teams were formed in different decades, Semen Padang was formed on 30 November 1980 and plays its home games at the Gelora Haji Agus Salim Stadium in Padang – while Sriwijaya was only formed almost 25 years later, on 23 October 2004, after the South Sumatra government bought the bankrupt North Jakarta club Persijatim Solo FC and moved its home ground to the Gelora Sriwijaya Stadium in Palembang.

The 2010–11 Indonesia Super League was the first competitive league season between the two after Semen Padang were promoted from the second division the previous season – while Sriwijaya were then one of the best teams in the Indonesian football, becoming the first and only club in Indonesia to ever achieve the double in 2008, and becoming first and only club to ever win the Copa Indonesia in three consecutive seasons from 2008 to 2010. The first match between the two teams in the competition took place on 2 February 2011 at Gelora Sriwijaya Stadium. Sriwijaya managed to score two goals from Keith "Kayamba" Gumbs in the 24th minute and Rudi Widodo in the 32nd minute. After Sriwijaya's lead, the match became increasingly heated with Saktiawan Sinaga getting a straight red card just before halftime and forcing Semen Padang to play with 10 men. The home team managed to score 3 more goals after the incident through Budi Sudarsono's brace in the 40th and 82nd minutes and Korinus Fingkrew's goal in the 79th minute. The match ended with a 5–0 win for Sriwijaya – also becoming Semen Padang's biggest defeat that season.

== Home grounds ==
Sriwijaya plays its home games at the 23,000-capacity Gelora Sriwijaya Stadium, located in the Jakabaring Sport City complex, Palembang, South Sumatra since its establishment in 2004. They have also occasionally used Bumi Sriwijaya Stadium, which is also located in Palembang since 2017. Gelora Haji Agus Salim Stadium is the home of Semen Padang with a capacity of 11,000 spectators, and is located in Padang, West Sumatra.

Stadiums	Tenants	Capacity	Location
Gelora Sriwijaya Stadium	Sriwijaya	23,000	Palembang, South Sumatra
Bumi Sriwijaya Stadium	Sriwijaya	15,000	Palembang, South Sumatra
Gelora Haji Agus Salim Stadium	Semen Padang	11,000	Padang, West Sumatra

== Results ==
Fixtures from 2011 to the present day featuring the first tier (Super League/Soccer Championship A/Liga 1), second tier (Liga 2) and minor cups (Inter Island Cup and SCM Cup) sorted from the most recent.

Semen Padang win Draw Sriwijaya win

Competition	Date	Result	Venue	City
Indonesia Super League	6 February 2011	5–0	Gelora Sriwijaya Stadium	Palembang
Indonesia Super League	8 March 2011	2–1	Gelora Haji Agus Salim Stadium	Padang
Inter Island Cup	10 January 2014	1–1	Gelora Haji Agus Salim Stadium	Padang
Inter Island Cup	14 January 2014	3–1	Gelora Sriwijaya Stadium	Palembang
Indonesia Super League	11 June 2014	2–1	Gelora Haji Agus Salim Stadium	Padang
Indonesia Super League	7 October 2014	1–1	Gelora Sriwijaya Stadium	Palembang
SCM Cup	19 January 2015	2–1	Gelora Haji Agus Salim Stadium	Padang
Indonesia Super League	7 April 2015	2–2	Gelora Sriwijaya Stadium	Palembang
Indonesia Soccer Championship A	4 November 2016	1–1	Gelora Sriwijaya Stadium	Palembang
Indonesia Soccer Championship A	15 July 2017	2–1	Gelora Haji Agus Salim Stadium	Padang
Liga 1	17 April 2017	1–1	Gelora Haji Agus Salim Stadium	Padang
Liga 1	11 August 2017	0–0	Gelora Sriwijaya Stadium	Palembang
Liga 2	11 October 2021	2–1	Gelora Sriwijaya Stadium	Palembang
Liga 2	10 November 2021	1–1	Gelora Haji Agus Salim Stadium	Padang
Liga 2	5 September 2023	2–2	Gelora Sriwijaya Stadium	Palembang
Liga 2	26 November 2023	3–0	Gelora Haji Agus Salim Stadium	Padang

== Statistics ==
As of 30 August 2024

Competition	Played	Semen Padang wins	Draws	Sriwijaya wins	Semen Padang goals	Sriwijaya goals
Indonesia Super League/Indonesia Soccer Championship A/Liga 1	9	3	5	1	11	13
Liga 2	4	1	2	1	7	5
Inter Island Cup	2	0	1	1	2	4
SCM Cup	1	0	0	1	1	2
Total	16	4	8	4	21	24

== Crossing the divide ==
As of 30 August 2024

=== Players ===
List of players that played for both teams.

Player	Semen Padang career	Sriwijaya career
(Indonesia) Ambrizal	2006–2007	2007–2010 2019–2021
(Indonesia) Asri Akbar	2006–2008	2014–2015
(Indonesia) Dedi Hartono	2006–2012 2019	2021
**(Indonesia) Jandia Eka Putra**	2009–2018	2024–
(Indonesia) Vendry Mofu	2010–2013 2014–2021	2013–2014
(Argentina) (Indonesia) Estebán Vizcarra	2010–2015	2017–2019
(South Korea) (Indonesia) Yoo Hyun-goo	2010–2016 2019–2020	2015–2018 2022
(Indonesia) Slamet Riyadi	2011	2006 2009–2010
(Indonesia) Abdul Rahman Sulaeman	2011–2012	2013–2014
(Indonesia) Ferdinand Sinaga	2011–2012	2014–2015
(Indonesia) Titus Bonai	2012–2013	2015
(Indonesia) Novan Sasongko	2012–2018	2018
**(Indonesia) Nur Iskandar**	2013–2016	2017–2019 2021–
(Indonesia) Eka Ramdani	2013–2016	2003–2004 (Note: Sriwijaya was still called Persijatim Solo at that time.) 2016–2017
(Indonesia) Valentino Telaubun	2013–2014	2021
(Indonesia) Seftia Hadi	2011–2012	2016–2017
(Indonesia) Airlangga Sutjipto	2014–2015	2016–2017 2019
(Indonesia) Nerius Alom	2015	2019
(Indonesia) Mariando Uropmabin	2015 2019	2016
(Cameroon) (Indonesia) Mohammadou Al Hadji	2015–2016	2018–2019
(Brazil) Diego Santos	2016	2011–2012
(Indonesia) Teja Paku Alam	2019	2013–2018
**(Indonesia) Manda Cingi**	2019 2021	2014–2018 2024–
(Indonesia) Rivky Mokodompit	2016	2011–2013
(Indonesia) Ngurah Nanak	2018	2009–2010 2015–2016
(Indonesia) Riski Novriansyah	2018–2019	2011–2012
(Indonesia) Muhammad Rifqi	2019	2010–2011 2023
(Indonesia) Firdaus Ramadhan	2020	2014 2017
(Indonesia) Ronaldo Meosido	2020	2021
(Indonesia) Gilang Ginarsa	2020–2021	2017
**(Indonesia) Genta Alparedo**	2021–2024	2024–

Note: Player names in bold are still active for one of the two clubs.

=== Managers ===
List of managers that coached the both teams.

Manager	Semen Padang career	Sriwijaya career
(Indonesia) Nil Maizar	2010–2012 2015–2017	2021
(Indonesia) **Jafri Sastra**	2012–2014	2024–

Note: Manager names in bold are still active for one of the two clubs.

== Supporters ==
Semen Padang has four supporter groups, The Kerbau Merah Suporter (Kmers), Spartacs, UWS 1980 and Padang Fans. The Kmers is the oldest Semen Padang supporter group which was established on 14 November 2001 and is directly affiliated with the team management. During Semen Padang matches, they usually occupy the north stands of the Gelora Haji Agus Salim Stadium. Spartacs is also the largest supporter base of the club which was founded on 18 May 2010, and is an independent Semen Padang supporter group. They occupy the south stand of the stadium.

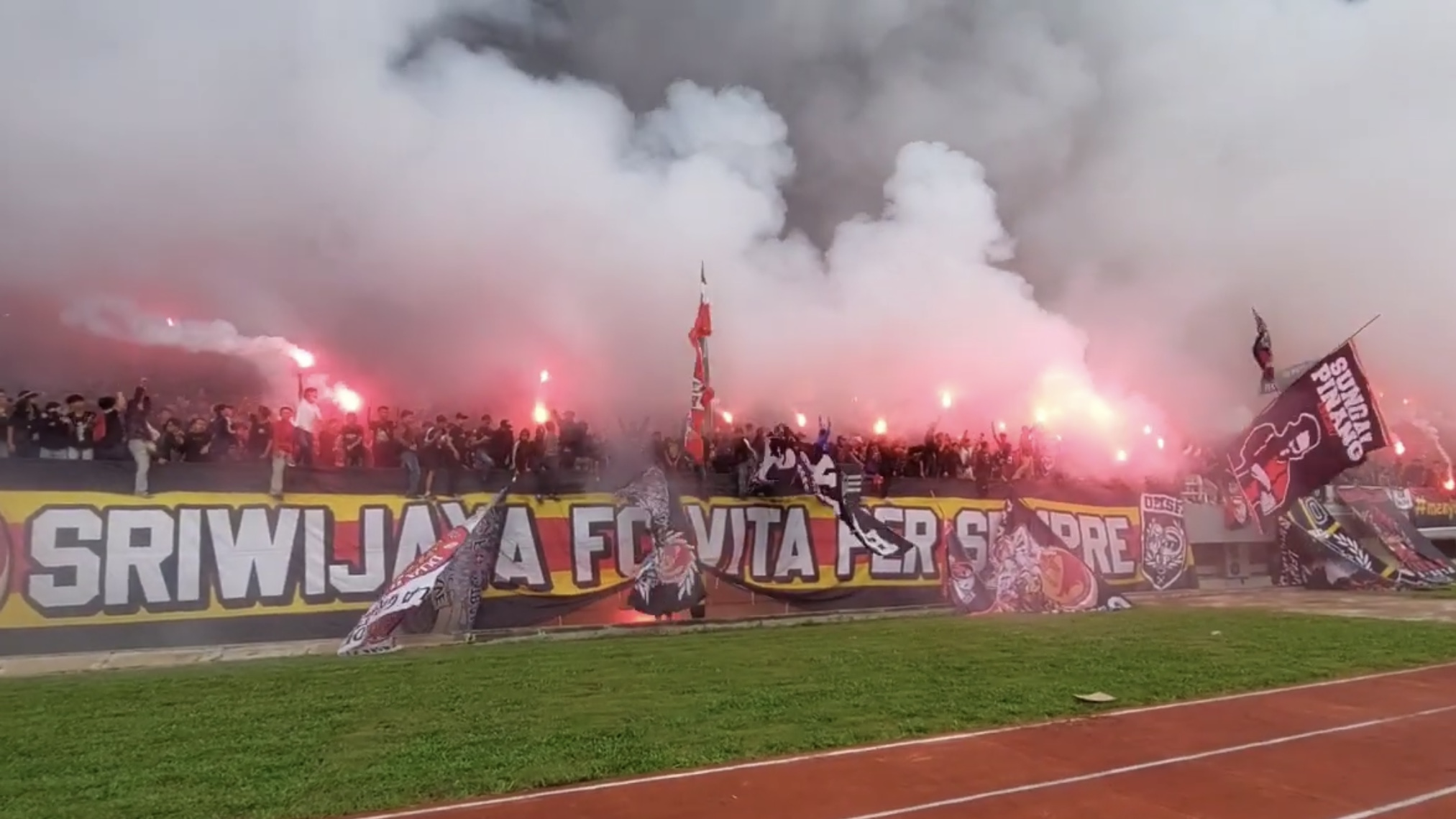
Ultras Palembang while supporting Sriwijaya in 2024.

Sriwijaya has three large supporter bases with cultural differences that occupy three stands at Gelora Sriwijaya Stadium wearing different colored attributes. Sriwijaya Mania (S-Man) is the oldest formed along with the club's debut in official competition in 2005 – the group controls the south stand of the stadium wearing yellow attributes. Singa Mania is a group of supporters wearing green attributes that were formed due to differences of opinion with S-Man at the end of 2005 – the group controls the north stand of the stadium. The third supporters group is Ultras Palembang which was born in 2007 following the trend of supporters from Italian culture, which takes on meaning beyond the ordinary. Ultras Palembang refers to the habits of Milan ultras supporters to introduce the phenomenon of supporters who are not just supporters, but have a solid, unwavering, and militant soul that truly involves the emotional side of the club. This group grew in an organized manner, wearing all-black attributes, and then used the East Stand to support the club.

== Trophies ==
Sriwijaya have won eight major trophies, compared to Semen Padang's four. Sriwijaya is also the first and only club in Indonesia to ever achieve the double in 2008, and the first and only club to ever win the Copa Indonesia in three consecutive seasons from 2008 to 2010.

Team	Major domestic					International						Grand total
Team	L1	PI	IIC	ICS	Total	ACC	ACLE	ACLT	ACL	FCWC / IC	Total	Grand total
Sriwijaya	2	3	2	1	8	—	—	—	—	—	0	8
Semen Padang	2 (Note: including one Semen Padang title when winning the Galatama First Division in 1983.)	1 (Note: including one Semen Padang title when winning the Galatama Cup in 1992.)	—	1	4	—	—	—	—	—	0	4

== See also ==
- List of association football club rivalries in Indonesia
- Nationalism and sport
- Liga 1 (Indonesia)
- Liga 2 (Indonesia)
- Football in Indonesia
