= Sriwijaya F.C. =

Indonesian football club

Sriwijaya
- Full name: Sriwijaya Football Club
- Nicknames: Laskar Wong Kito (Our People's Warriors); Elang Andalas (The Andalas Eagles)
- Short name: SFC
- Founded: 23 October 2004; 22 years ago
- Ground: Gelora Sriwijaya Stadium
- Capacity: 23,000
- Owner: PT Sriwijaya Optimis Mandiri
- President: Achmad Widjaja
- Head coach: Oktavianus
- League: Liga 4
- 2026–27: Liga Nusantara, withdrew (relegated)
- Website: www.sriwijaya-fc.com
Home colours	Away colours	Third colours

Sriwijaya Football Club (Indonesian pronunciation: [sriwiˈd͡ʒaja]), commonly known as Sriwijaya FC or simply SFC, is an Indonesian professional football club based in Palembang, South Sumatra. The club will compete in the Liga 4 next season, following relegation from the 2026–27 Liga Nusantara.

Founded on 23 October 2004, the team play their home games at Gelora Sriwijaya Stadium, which has a capacity of 23,000 spectators. The club won its first major honour, the Liga Indonesia Premier Division, in 2008. In the same season the club also won the Copa Indonesia, making them the first and only club in Indonesia to ever achieve the double. Sriwijaya have a fierce rivalry with nearby club Semen Padang, with whom they contest the Andalas derby.

== History ==
=== Foundation and early years ===
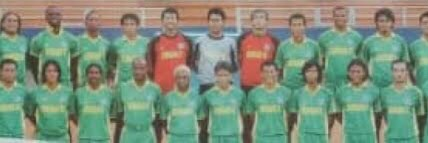
Sriwijaya's first-ever squad in 2005.

The club was founded on 23 October 2004 as Sriwijaya Football Club after the Government of South Sumatra, led by Syahrial Oesman, bought the debt-ridden Persijatim Solo FC, as the government wanted to manage a Palembang-based football team to compete in the top tier of Indonesian football. The province did not have any football clubs competing in the top tier of Indonesian football after the dissolution of Krama Yudha Tiga Berlian in 1992. The government also did not want the Gelora Sriwijaya Stadium, which was built with billions of rupiah to go wasted after the 2004 National Games. Historically, the club was founded in 1976 as Persijatim Jakarta Timur, which is based in East Jakarta, before changed its name to Persijatim Solo Football Club after the club was sold and moved their home base to Solo, Central Java in 2002. After the acquisition by the South Sumatra government in 2004, Sriwijaya moved its home base to Palembang, South Sumatra. The name "Sriwijaya" come from the ancient Srivijaya empire, that used to rule the land in the old days. Since then, the club is owned by PT Sriwijaya Optimis Mandiri.

Sriwijaya's first competitive season after the new ownership was 2005 Liga Indonesia Premier Division. The club's squad at that time was filled with some players from Persijatim Solo FC, such as Ferry Rotinsulu, Tony Sucipto, and Wijay. Also with the addition of native players from South Sumatra, such as Jarot and Septariyanto.

At the beginning of the season, the club was coached by an Englishman Erick Williams, before he was sacked in the middle of the season due to several poor performances that caused the club to fall into the relegation zone. Jeri Wardin, who was previously Williams' assistant, was appointed as the club's head coach before his position was finally replaced by Suimin Diharja. Under Diharja, Sriwijaya's performance gradually improved, and at the end of the season managed to maintain the club in the flagship competition after finishing in ninth place of West Division.

=== Double winner and Copa Indonesia dominance ===
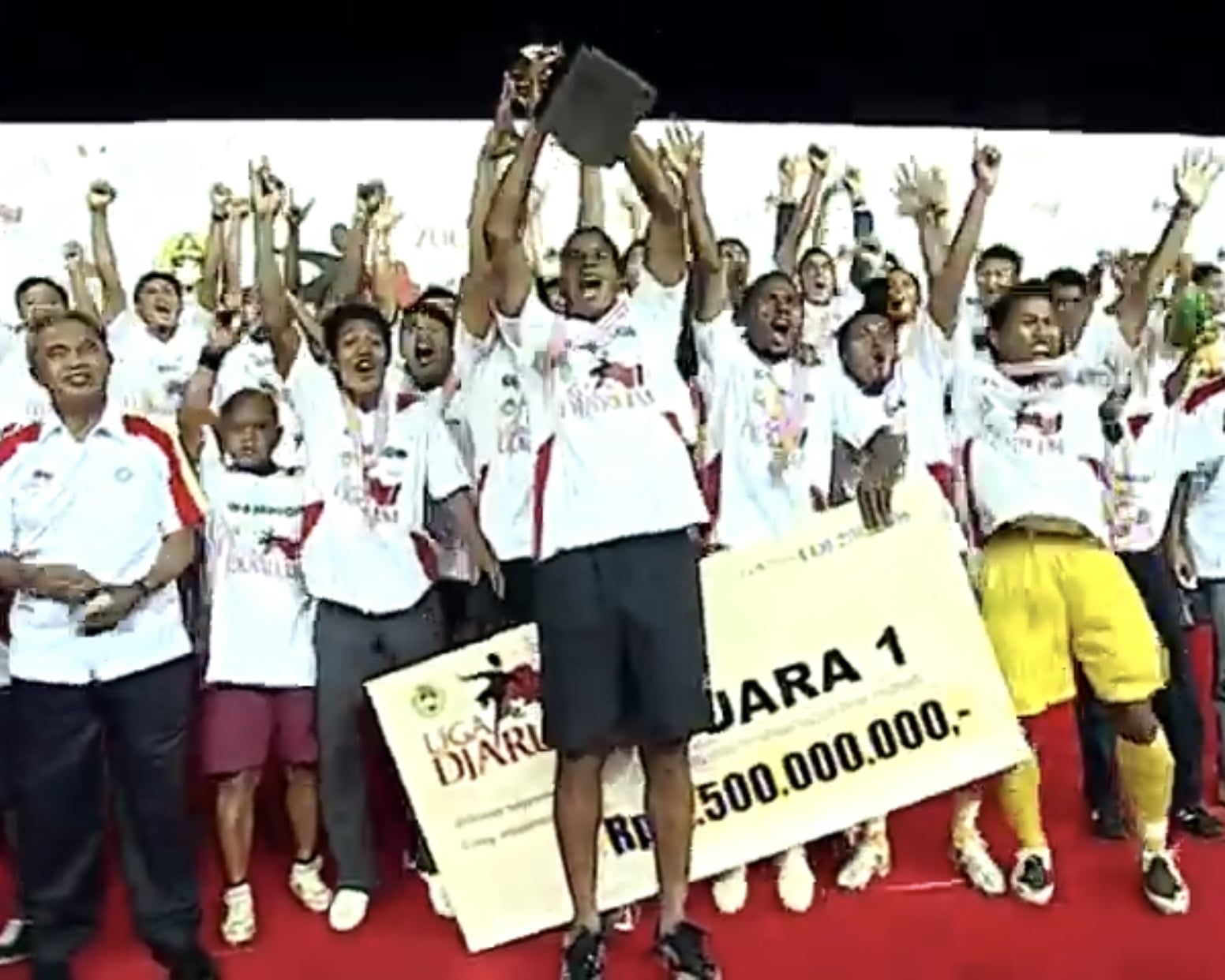
Sriwijaya players celebrated their first championship after winning the 2007–08 Liga Indonesia Premier Division.

In the 2007–2008 season, Sriwijaya became the first and only Indonesian club to achieve the double, by winning both the top division (Liga Indonesia Premier Division) and the primary domestic cup (Copa Indonesia) in the same season. At the start of the season, the club brought in Rahmad Darmawan as head coach, and local players on the squad included Christian Warobay, Charis Yulianto, and Isnan Ali. Foreign players included Anoure Obiora, Zah Rahan, Christian Lenglolo, and Keith "Kayamba" Gumbs. In the first stage, the club managed to top the final standings of the West Division with 66 points from 20 wins from 34 matches, better than Persipura Jayapura in the East Division with only 64 points.

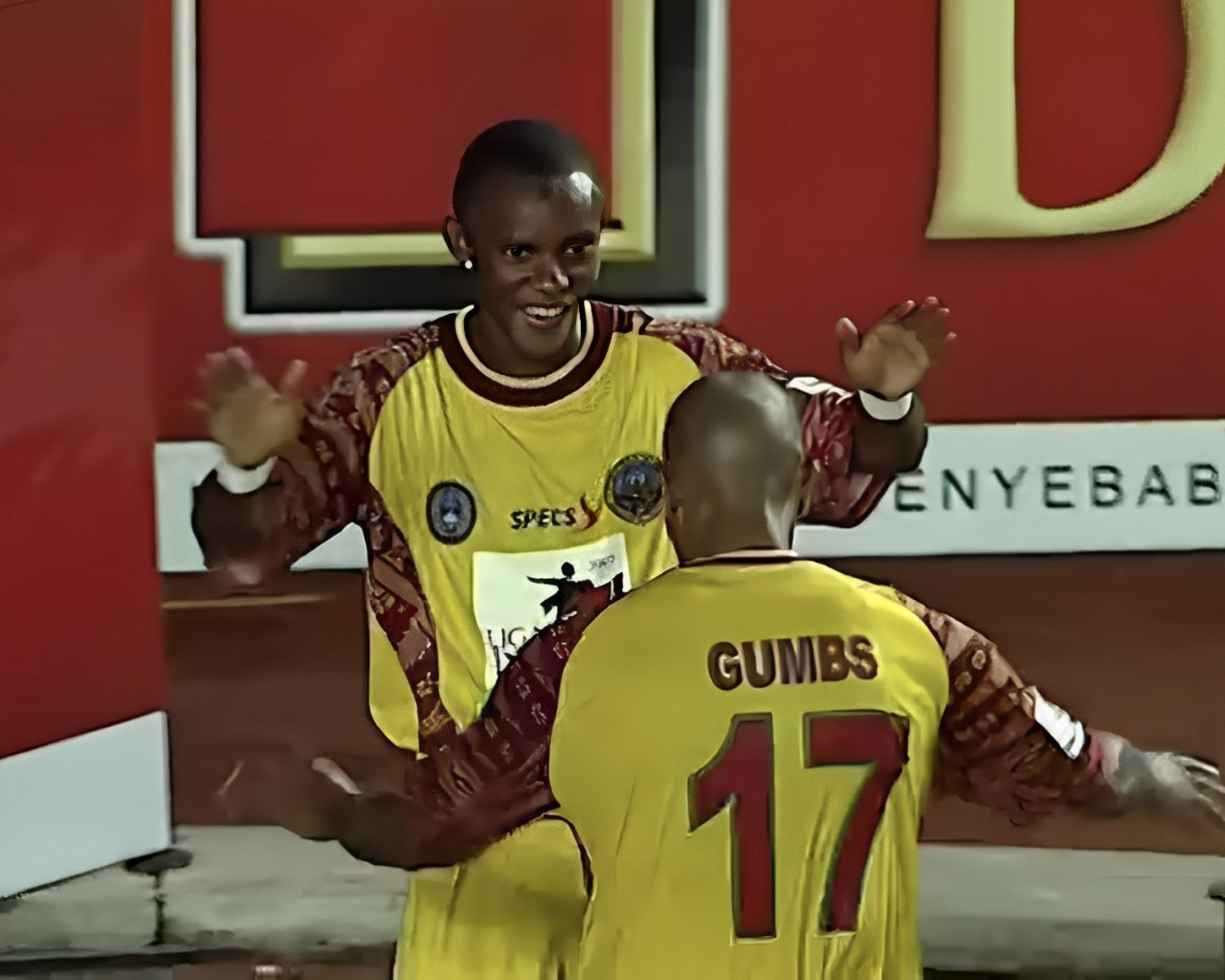
Zah Rahan and Keith "Kayamba" Gumbs celebrated a goal for Sriwijaya in 2008.

In the next stage, Sriwijaya was included in Group A of the last 8, competing with Persiwa Wamena, PSMS Medan, and Arema Malang. From 3 matches, the club topped the final standings of the group by collecting five points from three matches. This success also led Laskar Wong Kito to the knockout phase. In the semifinals, the club won narrowly 1–0 over Persija Jakarta where the only goal was scored by Kayamba. On 10 February 2008, the club competed in the final against another Sumatran team, PSMS Medan. The full-time result ended in a 1–1 draw which made the match continue to extra time. In the extra time, the club managed to score two goals by Kayamba and Zah Rahan which made the score 3–1 until the end of the match, which made Sriwijaya emerge as the champion of the 2007–08 Liga Indonesia Premier Division. This trophy also became Sriwijaya's first championship since the club was founded.

Sriwijaya Squad During the 2007–08 Championship Season

In the same season, Sriwijaya also won the domestic cup trophy, 2007–08 Copa Indonesia, which made them the first and only double champions in Indonesia to date. In the tournament, the club for the first time reached the final round, while securing this title after defeating Persipura in the final. In the final held at the Gelora Bung Karno Stadium, Sriwijaya emerged as champions after winning the penalty shootout.

In the 2008–09 season, after winning the domestic league and cup in the previous season, Sriwijaya competed on the continental stage for the first time. The club were placed in Group F of the 2009 AFC Champions League along with Gamba Osaka, FC Seoul and Shandong Luneng, but were only able to collect one win from 6 matches. This result made the club bottom of Group F. In domestic competition, Sriwijaya finished in fifth place of the 2008–09 Indonesia Super League with 54 points from 15 matches, and scored 60 goals. In domestic cup, they managed to win the Copa Indonesia for the second time in a row, and gave them a ticket to the AFC Champions League play-offs for the following season.

In the following season, Sriwijaya emerged as the champion of the 2010 Copa Indonesia, while also setting a record as the only domestic cup champion in three consecutive seasons. The result was achieved after the team won 2–1 over Arema Indonesia in the final, held at the Manahan Stadium on 1 August 2010. In the league, Sriwijaya was only able to finish in eighth place with 48 points in the 2009–10 Indonesia Super League, the club's worst result in the last 4 seasons. On the continental stage, the club started by competing against the Singapore Armed Forces in the 2010 AFC Champions League qualifying play-off, but lost 3–0 to the Singapore team, and had to fall to the second level of Asian competition, AFC Cup. The club won the Group F of 2010 AFC Cup by beating Bình Dương, Selangor and Victory SC in the final standings. In the round of 16, Sriwijaya had to fall after losing 1–4 to Thai Port, despite having taken the lead through a goal from Anoure Obiora.

=== Second league title and continental appearances ===
In mid-2010, Sriwijaya terminated Rahmad Darmawan's contract, and appointed Bulgarian coach Ivan Kolev – who had previously coached the Indonesia national team – as head coach. Under Kolev, the club managed to win 2 cup trophies before the league started, 2010 Indonesian Community Shield and Indonesian Inter-Island Cup. In the league, the club captained by Keith "Kayamba" Gumbs, reinforced by a combination of elite local and foreign players, such as Thierry Gathuessy, Achmad Jufrianto, Ponaryo Astaman, Firman Utina, Budi Sudarsono, and Oktavianus Maniani. Despite having a capable squad, at the end of the season, the club was only able to finish in fifth place in the 2010–11 Indonesia Super League with 46 points. This result made the club terminate Ivan Kolev's contract ahead of the next season.

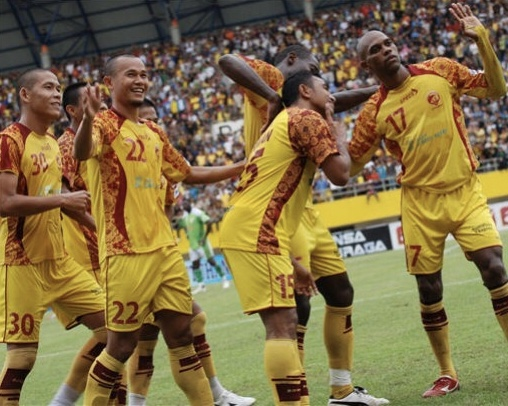
Sriwijaya players celebrated a goal in the 2011–12 Indonesia Super League.

Sriwijaya Squad During the 2011-12 Championship Season

In 2011, Kas Hartadi was promoted as Sriwijaya's head coach after being Kolev's assistant the previous season. The club's new season with Hartadi was to compete in the qualifying play-off round of the 2011 AFC Champions League. In the first match, the team managed to beat Muangthong United on penalties, but lost in the next round to UAE team, Al Ain. This result made the club compete in the AFC Cup for the second time, where Sriwijaya managed to qualify for the knockout stage after finishing as runners-up in the final standings of Group F, alongside group winners Sông Lam Nghệ An. In the round of 16, the team failed to secure a ticket to the quarter-finals after losing to Chonburi 3–0.

In the league, Sriwijaya appeared in the 2011–12 Indonesian Super League, which was under the control of a joint committee to continue to be managed by PT Liga Indonesia. This competition was the first ISL season held without permission from the Football Association of Indonesia due to internal conflict, where PSSI under the leadership of Johar Arifin officially replaced the top league with Indonesian Premier League.

Despite the polemics, Sriwijaya managed to appear mighty throughout the season with the famous duo of Kayamba-Hilton, and managed to win the league for the second time at the end of the season. The team managed to top the final standings with 25 wins – the most in a single season in the history of the Indonesian top-flight. Sriwijaya lifted the league trophy after winning the Perang Bintang (Star Wars) match against the ISL All-Star on 15 July 2012 at the Gelora Sriwijaya Stadium. At the end of the year, Sriwijaya also managed to win the 2012 Indonesian Inter-Island Cup after defeating Persisam Samarinda 5–4 in a penalty shootout on 13 December 2012 at Manahan Stadium.

=== Financial problem and first relegation ===
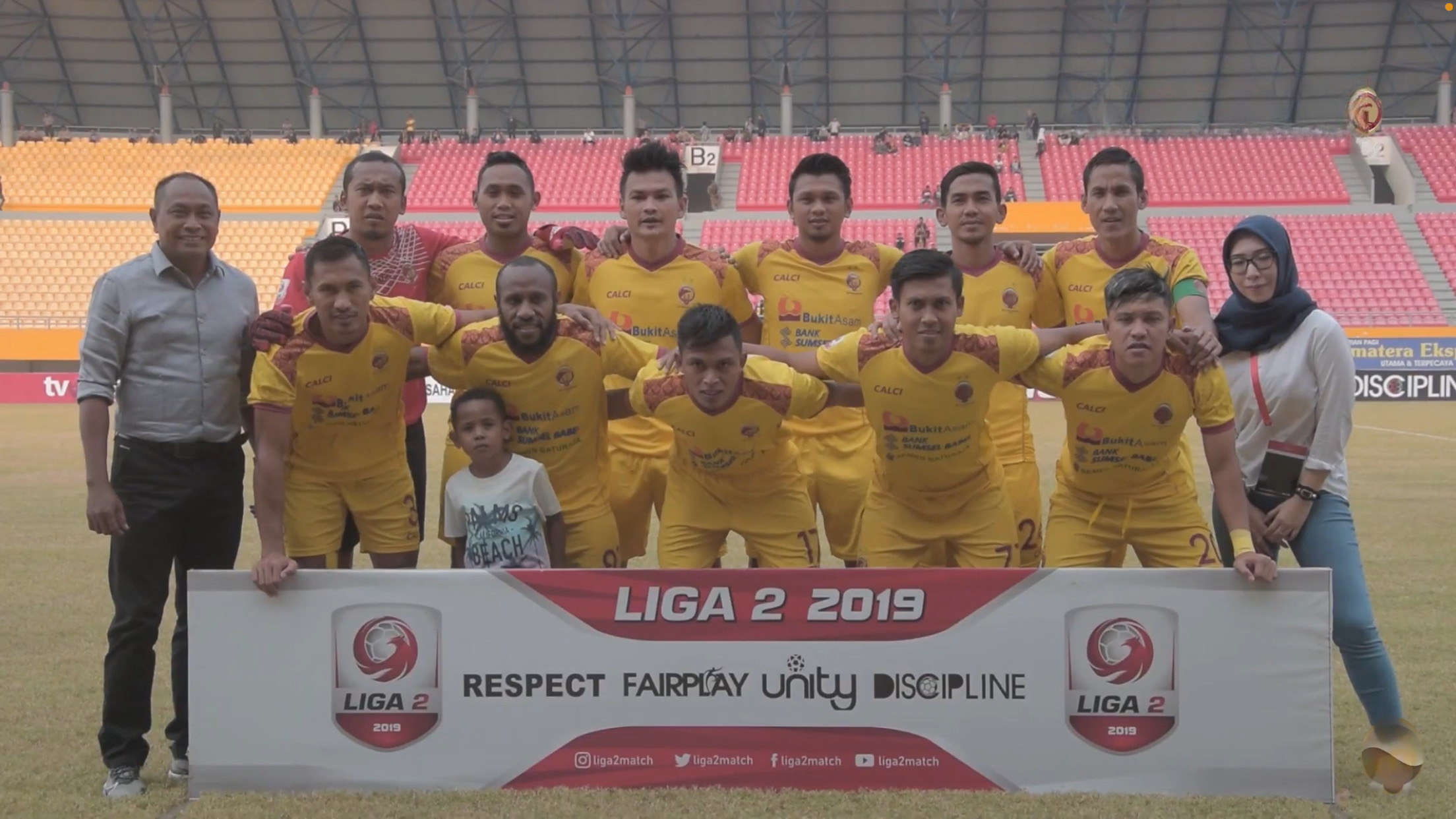
Sriwijaya starting line-up in 2019 Liga 2 season.

In early 2018, ahead of a Liga 1 season, coinciding with the club's president at that time, Dodi Reza Alex, who was running for Governor of South Sumatra in the People's Democratic Party, Laskar Wong Kito was intensively active in the transfer market. They brought in 12 players, most of whom were elite local players, such as Hamka Hamzah, Estebán Vizcarra, Syahrian Abimanyu, and Adam Alis – along with 3 foreign players, Mouhamadou N'Diaye, Manuchekhr Dzhalilov, and Makan Konaté. The club also brought back Rahmad Darmawan as head coach, who had coached the club when it won the double in 2008, and the Copa Indonesia three times in a row. The results of this club's activities paid off with the team winning the pre-season tournament, the East Kalimantan Governor's Cup after defeating Arema 3–2 in the final match. However, in the middle of the season, with Dodi Reza's failure in the general election, Sriwijaya suddenly lost several key players and coaches. This caused the team to falter as they entered the second half of the season, and were relegated to Indonesia's second division, Liga 2, for the following season. This happened after they finished second from bottom in the 2018 Liga 1.

In November 2026, the club withdrew from Liga Nusantara.

== Colours and badge ==
=== Badge ===
The first logo on the Sriwijaya emblem was introduced in 2004 after the club was acquired, featuring a simple logo with a round shape dominated by the color blue. Inside the logo is written the name and acronym of the club. The following year, a new, more complex logo was introduced, symbolizing the club's strength, unity, and peace. The logo takes a form of a circle, with aspects included in the logo include the words Sumatera Selatan (South Sumatra) indicating that the club is owned by the government of South Sumatra. The words Bersatu Teguh (United Firmly) represent the integrity of the supporters and the club. The image of the Garuda shows strength and precision. Behind the main logo, Mount Dempo and the Ampera Bridge are seen, both seen as the pride and determination of South Sumatra.

In the 2008–09 season as double winners after winning the top division (Liga Indonesia Primer Division) and the primary domestic cup (Copa Indonesia) in the previous season, Sriwijaya launched the second one which is still used today. The club's new logo is oval shaped and dominated by the colors maroon and flaxen. Some aspects of the old logo are still maintained in this logo, such as the words Sumatera Selatan Bersatu Teguh written in white letters, as well as the icon of the Ampera Bridge in maroon. A new aspect added was the image of an Eagle, replacing the previously used Garuda, thus creating a new club nickname, Elang Andalas (The Andalas Eagles).

2004–2005

2005–2009

2009–present

=== Colours ===
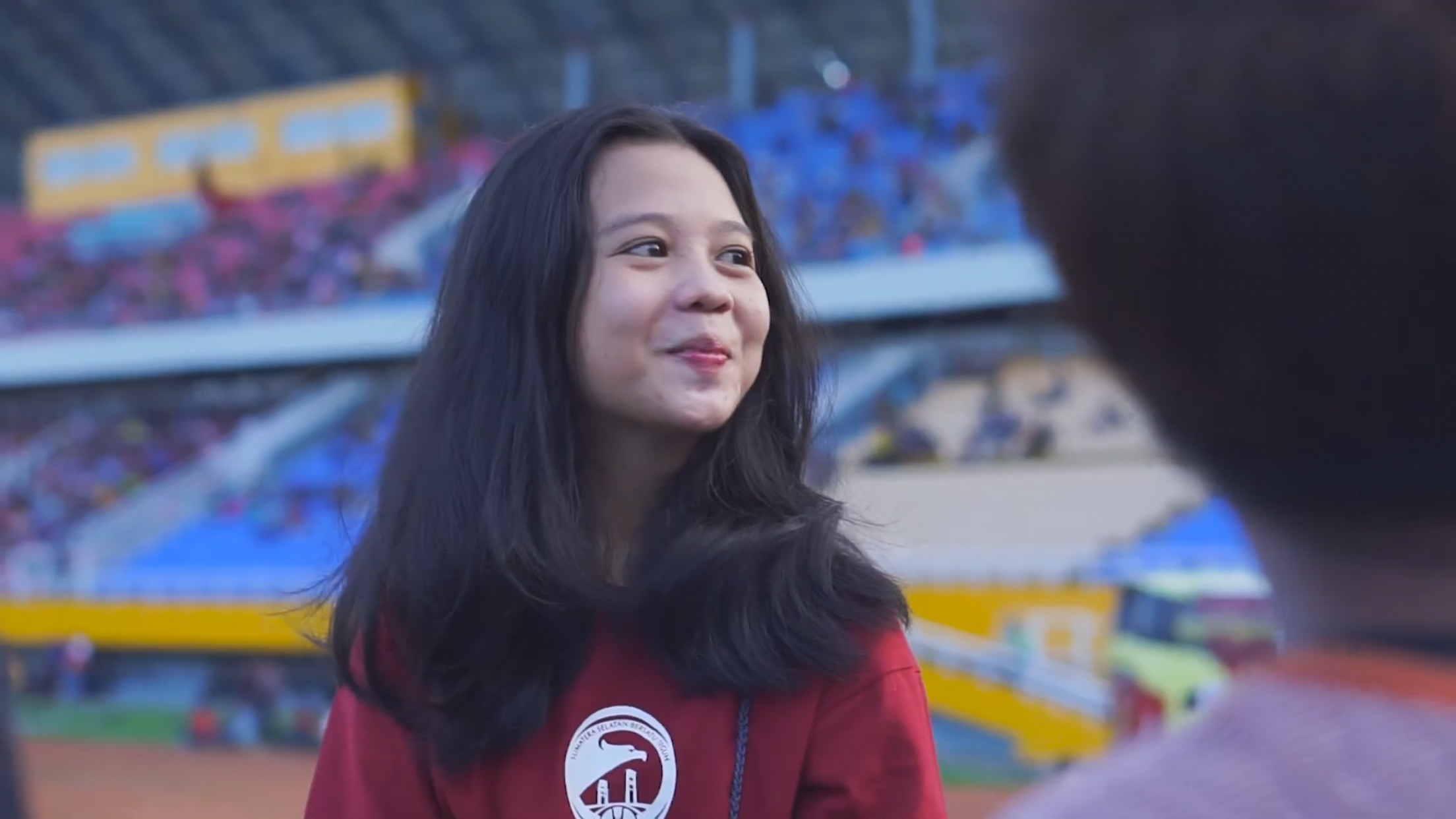
A girl wearing maroon attributes while supporting Sriwijaya.

Historically, Sriwijaya's identity colors are yellow and green, which represent the coat of arms of South Sumatra. The club has used yellow as its home jersey color for more than a decade since its formation. In the 2020 season, the club made a surprising decision by changing the club's color identity and the home jersey color to maroon. This color change was based on the concern that the Sriwijaya supporter group could later unite with one color. Maroon was chosen because it is the typical color of the icon of Palembang, the Ampera Bridge.

In addition to color, the pattern of songket, a tenun fabric from Sumatra, has also been the identity of the club's kit since the 2007–08 season, which continues to be used as a shirt ornament to the present day.

=== Kit suppliers ===
Period	Kit manufacturer
2004–2005	Adidas
2005–2009	Specs
2009–2011	Reebok
2011–2012	Specs
2012–2017	Joma
2017–2020	Calci
2021–2024	Tweve
2024–2025	Circleg
2025–present	Ereight

=== Anthem ===
"Kito Pacak" is the title of the Sriwijaya song. The title is taken from the Palembang language, which means "We Can". The song was created in 2018 by the team captain at that time, Hamka Hamzah and was recorded with representatives of several Sriwijaya supporter groups. Since its release, the song has always been played as an anthem before and after the team's home games, aiming to strengthen relations between the three groups of the club supporters (Singa Mania, S-Man and Ultras Palembang).

== Stadiums ==
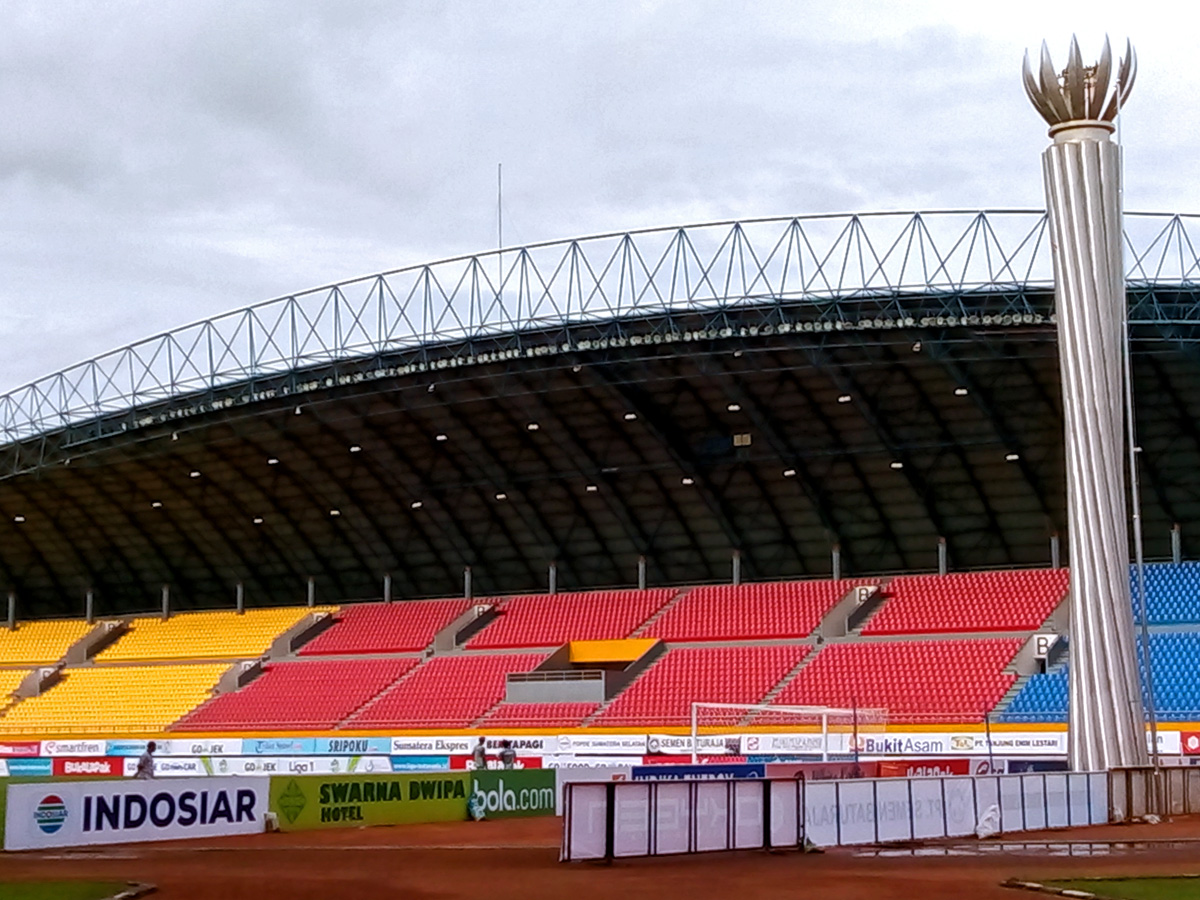
View of Gelora Sriwijaya Stadium in 2018.

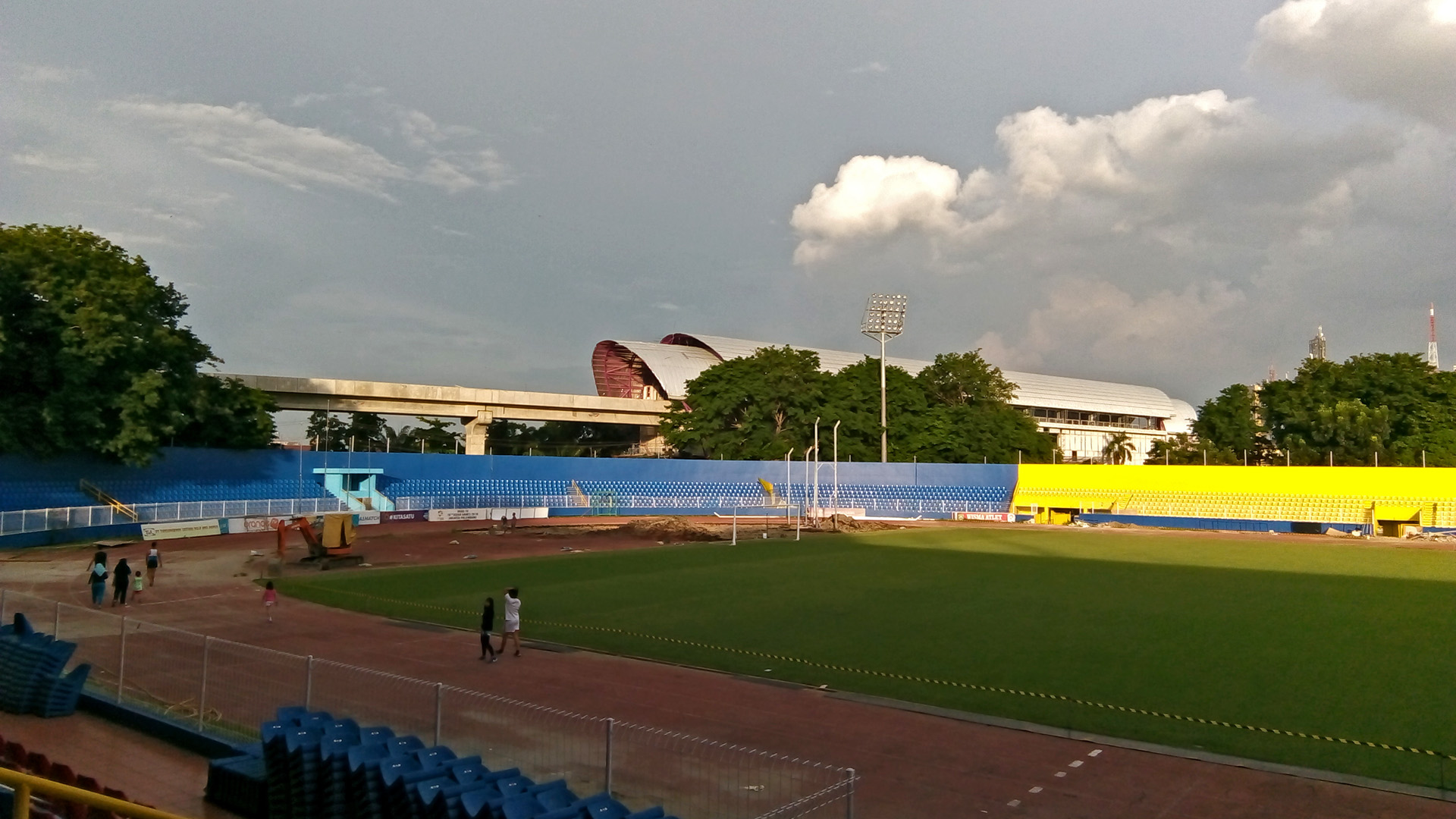
The club occasional ground, Bumi Sriwijaya Stadium.

Since its founding in 2004, Sriwijaya has played its home games at Jakabaring Stadium, which was later renamed Gelora Sriwijaya Stadium to honor and celebrate the 7th—13th century Indonesian empire of Srivijaya. The stadium located in the Jakabaring Sport City complex, Palembang, South Sumatra and has a capacity of 23,000 spectators. The stadium was built by the South Sumatra government in 2001 and completed in 2004 to host the National Games. The stadium has been the home of the Indonesia national team for several times, and is also the home of the Indonesia women's national team. The last renovation carried out was during preparation to host the 2021 FIFA U-20 World Cup. The government increased the budget to IDR20 billion to repair the renovation of the Gelora Sriwijaya Stadium for: Repairing the main field, repainting the front of the stadium, and the using of FIFA standard grass, Zoysia matrella.

For the 2017 Liga 1 and most of the 2018 Liga 1, Sriwijaya had to move their ground to Bumi Sriwijaya Stadium, which is also located in Palembang, when Gelora Sriwijaya Stadium underwent renovation for the 2018 Asian Games and was later used as one of the venues for the multi-sport event. Bumi Sriwijaya has a capacity of 15,000 spectators and after its renovation in 2017 the capacity was decreased into 6,000 spectators and all seater.

== Supporters and rivalries ==
=== Supporters ===
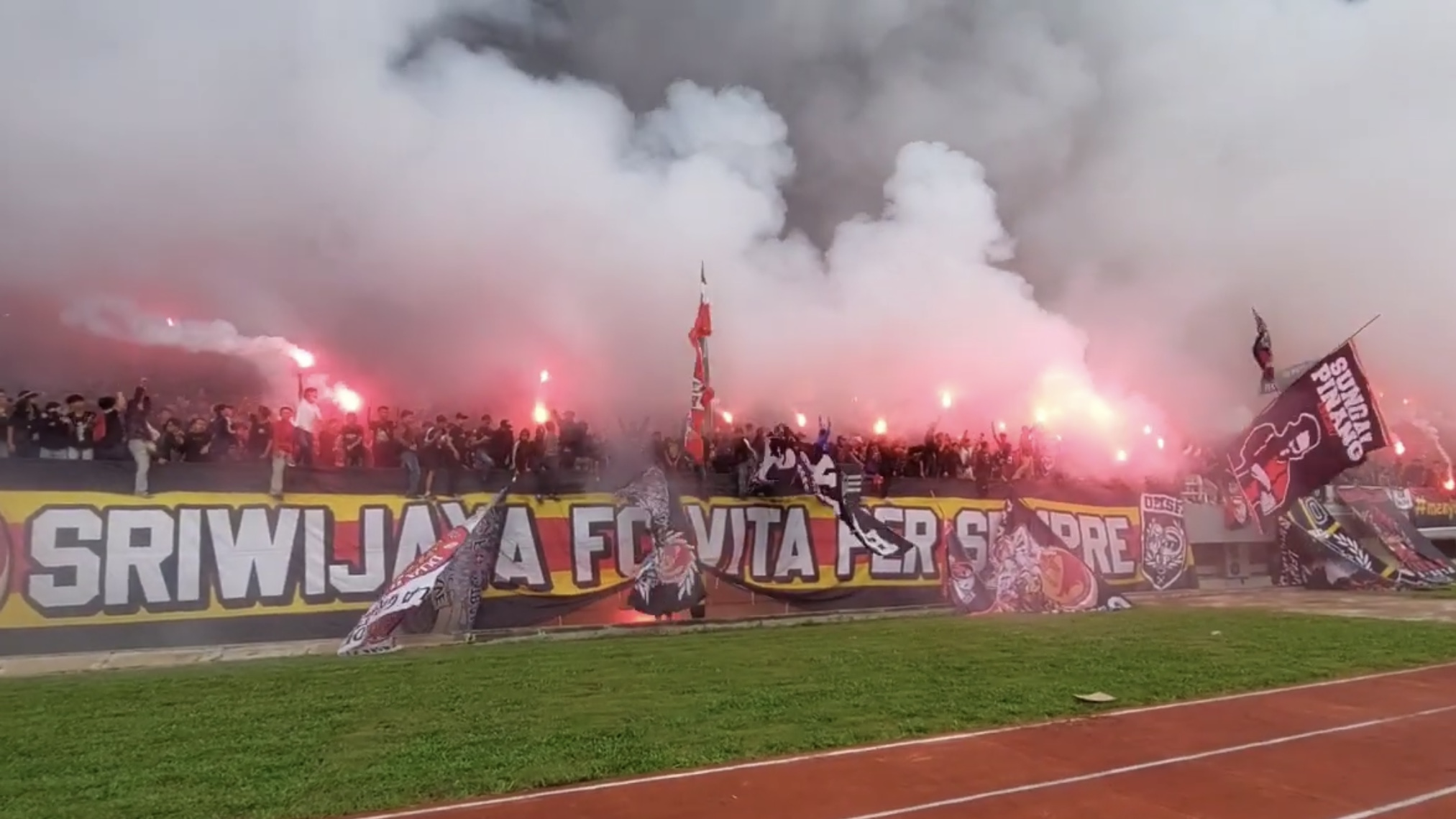
Ultras Palembang while supporting Sriwijaya in 2024.

Along with the establishment of Sriwijaya Football Club which made its debut in the 2005 Liga Indonesia Premier Division, the only Sriwijaya supporter group at that time was called SFC Mania, which later changed to Sriwijaya Mania (or commonly abbreviated as S-Man), with its chairman Mohammad Masyaheril. In 2005, there was a split so that Sriwijaya Mania was divided into two, Sriwijaya Ngamuk Mania (Singa Mania) and Sriwijaya Mania Sumsel (SMS). Singa Mania was born due to differences in principles when he was still part of S-Man. The emergence of Singa Mania was influenced by the oddity of the S-Man organizational system which was not transparent. This supporter group chose the North Stand as a place for them to shout proud chants to support the club with their grand-green clothes, which are a representation of the symbol of South Sumatra. While SMS chose the South Stand and wore yellow clothes, in harmony with the club's colors.

In 2007, Ultras Palembang was born following the trend of supporters from Italian culture, which takes the meaning of out of the ordinary. Ultras Palembang refers to the habits of AC Milan supporters to introduce the phenomenon of supporters who are not just supporters, but have a solid, unbreakable soul, and militants who really involve the emotional side of the club. This group grew in an organized manner, wearing all-black attributes, and then using the East Stand to support the club.

=== Rivalries ===
Sriwijaya's main rival is with a nearby club Semen Padang from Padang, West Sumatra. The two teams compete in the Andalas derby, representing the name and culture of each club's city and province. The other Sumatran derby is with PSMS Medan. One of the most famous derby matches ever played by the club was on 10 February 2008 during the grand final of the 2007–08 Liga Indonesia Premier Division against PSMS Medan. The full-time ended in a 1–1 draw which sent the match into extra time. In the extra time, the club managed to score two goals by Keith "Kayamba" Gumbs and Zah Rahan which made the score 3–1 until the end of the match, which made Sriwijaya come out as league champions that season. Sriwijaya also has an inter-island rivalry with Persipura Jayapura, where the two giant clubs competed for the domestic title in the 2000s to early 2010s. The matches they play are always heated and take place with high intensity, which makes their meetings called "The Real Clásico".

== Players ==
=== First-team squad ===
As of 6 October 2026

Note: Flags indicate national team as defined under FIFA eligibility rules; some limited exceptions apply. Players may hold more than one non-FIFA nationality.

No.	Pos.	Nation	Player
1	GK	IDN	Febrian Putra
3	DF	IDN	Derry Herlangga
7	FW	IDN	Revan Nurianto
8	MF	IDN	Nugroho Fatchur Rochman
9	FW	IDN	Husnuzhon
10	FW	IDN	Aaron Yekti
11	MF	IDN	Fadil Redian
15	MF	IDN	Ananda Bagus
17	FW	IDN	Zarhan Fahrezi
19	DF	IDN	Faqih Tahapary

No.	Pos.	Nation	Player
20	FW	IDN	Agni Fathurahman
21	DF	IDN	Angga Sukmantoro
25	MF	IDN	Mukhti Arya Muslim
30	DF	IDN	Hary Nasution
55	DF	IDN	Rizky Abdiansyah
77	FW	IDN	Sayfullah Kader
81	MF	IDN	Reynaldy Junior
88	MF	IDN	Bayan Adam
91	MF	IDN	Erick Cantona
93	FW	IDN	Sehabudin Ahmad

== Club officials ==
=== Management ===
Position	Name
President	(Indonesia) Achmad Widjaja
Vice-President	(Indonesia) Muhammad David
Sporting Director	(Indonesia) Anggoro Prajesta
Financial Director	(Indonesia) Ajie Syahrial Bastari
Marketing Director	(Indonesia) Abraham Busro
Competition Director	(Indonesia) Berman Limbong
General Commissioner	(Indonesia) Asfan Fikri Sanaf
Secretary	(Indonesia) Safrizal Afandi

=== Coaching staff ===
Position	Name
Team manager	(Indonesia) Eko Saputro
Head coach	(Indonesia) Oktavianus
Assistant coach	(Indonesia) Cipta Adikodrati (Indonesia) Sudirman (Indonesia) Tedi Berlian
Goalkeeping coach	(Indonesia) Gary Setiawan
Fitness coach	(Indonesia) Yulian Syahreva
Video Analyst	(Indonesia) Lutfi Muthohhar
Physiotherapist	(Indonesia) Ari Hidayat
Physiotherapist	(Indonesia) Siera Fadhila

== Coaches ==
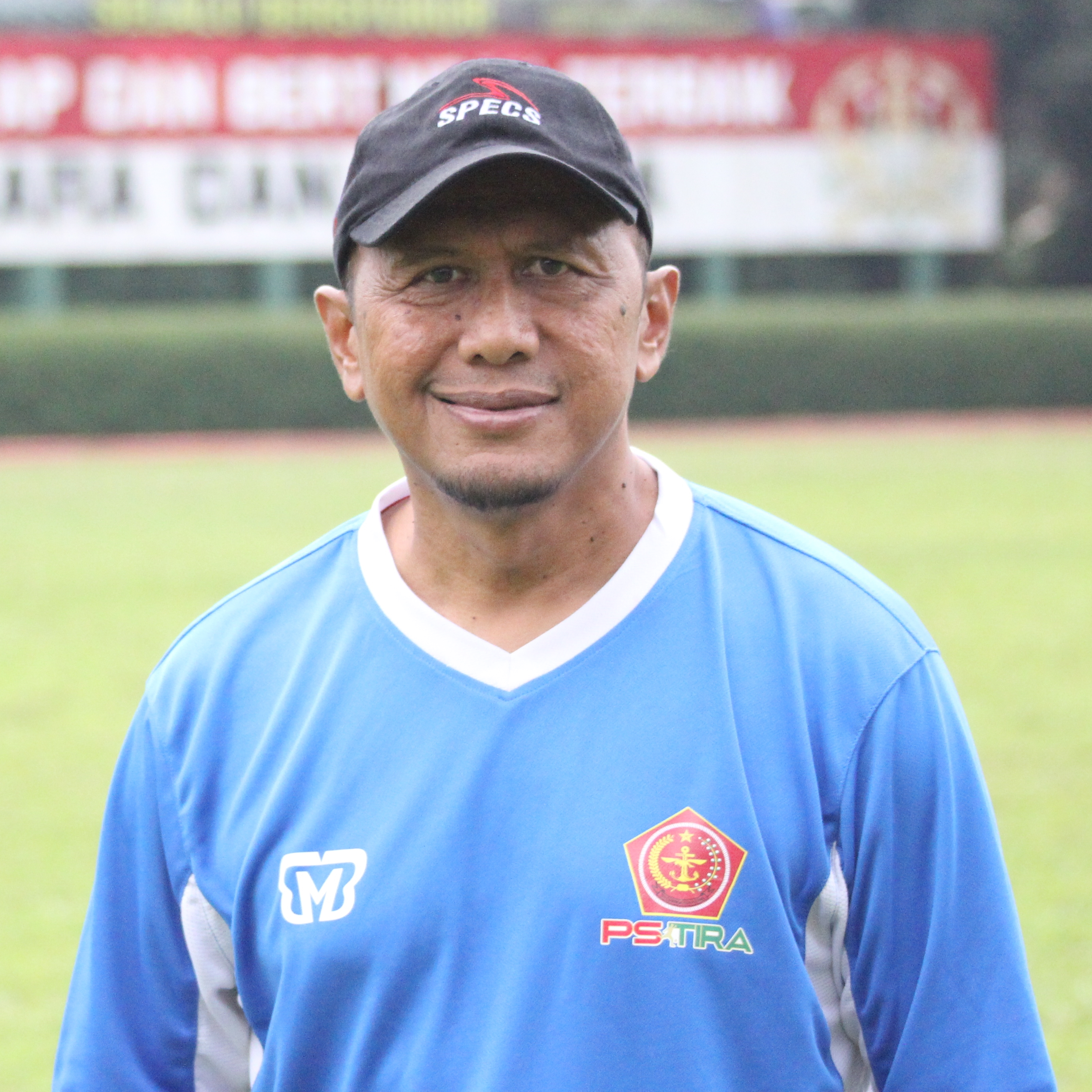
Rahmad Darmawan, the most successful manager in the history of Sriwijaya.

Below is a list of Sriwijaya head coaches from 2004 until the present day.

Name	Nationality	Years
Erick Williams	(England)	2004–2005
Jenny Wardin	(Indonesia)	2005
Suimin Diharja	(Indonesia)	2005–2006
Rahmad Darmawan	(Indonesia)	2007–2010
Ivan Kolev	(Bulgaria)	2010–2011
Kas Hartadi	(Indonesia)	2011–2013
Subangkit	(Indonesia)	2013–2014
Benny Dollo	(Indonesia)	2014–2016
Widodo C. Putro	(Indonesia)	2016–2017
Osvaldo Lessa	(Brazil)	2017
Hartono Ruslan	(Indonesia)	2017
Rahmad Darmawan	(Indonesia)	2017–2018
Alfredo Vera	(Argentina)	2018

Name	Nationality	Years
Subangkit	(Indonesia)	2018–2019
Kas Hartadi	(Indonesia)	2019–2020
Budiarjo Thalib	(Indonesia)	2020–2021
Nil Maizar	(Indonesia)	2021–2022
Liestiadi	(Indonesia)	2022–2023
Yusup Prasetiyo	(Indonesia)	2023
Hendri Susilo	(Indonesia)	2023–2024
Jafri Sastra	(Indonesia)	2024
Hendri Susilo	(Indonesia)	2024–2025
Achmad Zulkifli	(Indonesia)	2025
Budi Sudarsono	(Indonesia)	2025–2026
Iwan Setiawan	(Indonesia)	2026
Oktavianus	(Indonesia)	2026–

== Honours ==
=== Domestic ===
Domestic
League/Division	Titles	Runners-up	Seasons won	Seasons runners-up
Indonesia Premier Division/Indonesia Super League	2	0	2007–08, 2011–12 (Note: Indonesia Super League wasn't recognized by PSSI at that year.)	
Domestic
Cup Competitions	Titles	Runners-up	Seasons won	Seasons runners-up
Copa Indonesia/Piala Indonesia	3	0	2007–08, 2008–09, 2010	
Indonesian Community Shield	1	1	2010	2009
Inter Island Cup	2	0	2010, 2012	
Indonesia President's Cup	0	1		2015

=== Continental ===
- AFC Cup / AFC Champions League Two
  - Round of 16 (2): 2010, 2011

=== Other titles ===
- East Kalimantan Governor Cup
  - Winner (1): 2018

=== Doubles ===
- Liga Indonesia Premier Division and Copa Indonesia: 2007–08

== Season-by-season records ==
=== Domestic records ===
Season(s)	League/Division	Tms.	Pos.	Piala Indonesia
2005	Premier Division	28	9th, West Division	Second Round
2006	Premier Division	28	6th, West Division	First Round
2007–08	Premier Division	36	1st	Champions
2008–09	Indonesia Super League	18	5th	Champions
2009–10	Indonesia Super League	18	8th	Champions
2010–11	Indonesia Super League	15	5th	–
2011–12	Indonesia Super League	18	1st	did not participated
2013	Indonesia Super League	18	5th	–
2014	Indonesia Super League	22	6th, West Division	–
2015	Indonesia Super League	18	did not finish	–
2016	Indonesia Soccer Championship A	18	4th	–
2017	Liga 1	18	11th	–
2018	Liga 1	18	17th	Round of 16
2019	Liga 2	24	4th	–
2020	Liga 2	24	did not finish	–
2021	Liga 2	24	Second Round	–
2022–23	Liga 2	28	did not finish	–
2023–24	Liga 2	28	Relegation Round, 1st (Group A)	–
2024–25	Liga 2	26	Relegation Round, 2nd (Group H)	–
2025–26	Championship	20	10th, Group A	–
2026–27	Liga Nusantara	24	Withdrew	–

Key

- Tms. = Number of teams
- Pos. = Position in league

=== Continental records ===
Season	Competition	Round	Opposition	Home	Away	Agg.
2009	AFC Champions League	Group F	(Japan) Gamba Osaka	0–3	0–5	4th
2009	AFC Champions League	Group F	(South Korea) FC Seoul	2–4	1–5	4th
2009	AFC Champions League	Group F	(China) Shandong Luneng	4–2	0–5	4th
2010	AFC Champions League	Play-off round	Singapore Armed Forces	0–3		
2010	AFC Cup	Group C	(Vietnam) Bình Dương	1–0	1–2	1st
2010	AFC Cup	Group C	(Malaysia) Selangor	6–1	4–0	1st
2010	AFC Cup	Group C	(Maldives) Victory	5–0	3–0	1st
2010	AFC Cup	Round of 16	(Thailand) Thai Port	1–4		
2011	AFC Champions League	Play-off round	(Thailand) Muangthong United	2–2 (aet) (7–6 p)		
2011	AFC Champions League	Play-off round	(United Arab Emirates) Al Ain	0–4		
2011	AFC Cup	Group C	(Vietnam) Sông Lam Nghệ An	3–1	0–4	2nd
2011	AFC Cup	Group C	(Hong Kong) TSW Pegasus	3–2	2–1	2nd
2011	AFC Cup	Group C	(Maldives) VB	1–1	0–2	2nd
2011	AFC Cup	Round of 16	(Thailand) Chonburi	0–3		

== Continental ranking ==
As of 6 December 2023

Current Rank	Country	Team	Points
126	(Saudi Arabia)	Al-Raed	13.14
127	(Indonesia)	Madura United	13.13
128	(Indonesia)	Sriwijaya	13.13
129	(South Korea)	Gwangju FC	13.13
130	(Japan)	Nagoya Grampus	13.12
