= Oktavianus =

Indonesian footballer

Personal information
- Full name: Oktavianus Erwin Eramuri
- Date of birth: 1 October 1981 (age 45)
- Place of birth: Padang, Indonesia
- Height: 1.65 m (5 ft 5 in)
- Position: Left winger

Youth career
- Semen Padang
- 2002: PON Sumsel

Senior career*
| Years | Team | Apps | (Gls) |
| 2001−2006 | Semen Padang | 139 | (8) |
| 2007−2010 | Sriwijaya | 41 | (2) |
| 2010−2011 | Persija Jakarta | 39 | (1) |
| 2012 | PSPS Pekanbaru | 10 | (0) |
| 2013–2014 | Persija Jakarta | 18 | (0) |
| 2014–2015 | PS Bangka | 7 | (0) |
| 2016–2017 | Persik Kediri | 20 | (0) |
| Total | | 274 | (11) |

Managerial career
- 2021–2022: Jambi United
- 2023: Ex-Simbels Arsyfa
- 2023–2025: Sriwijaya (assistant)
- 2025: Persebi Batanghari
- 2026–: Sriwijaya
- * Club domestic league appearances and goals

Oktavianus Erwin Eramuri (born 1 October 1981) was an Indonesian football manager, and is most recently the football coach of the Liga Nusantara club Sriwijaya FC.

== Honours ==
Sriwijaya

- Liga Indonesia Premier Division: 2007–08
- Copa Indonesia/Piala Indonesia: 2007–08, 2008–09, 2010
