= Fossa dei Leoni =

Italian ultra group of A.C. MIlan (1968–2005)

- Abbreviation: FdL
- Formation: 1968
- Dissolved: 17 November 2005
- Purpose: Ultras group
- Location: Milan, Italy
- Website: fdl.it

The Fossa dei Leoni (FDL transl. Lions' Den) was an association of ultras supporters of Italian professional football club Associazione Calcio Milan. Established in 1968, it was the second ultras group to form in Italy, after Commandos Tigre (also supporters of AC Milan) in 1967.

== History ==
=== Origin to dissolution ===
The association was originally a group of young supporters who started to meet on ramp 18 of popular sectors of San Siro stadium, in Milan. They wore the uniform of AC Milan and brought flags and confetti to the stadium. The name was chosen due to the nickname of A.C. Milan's old stadium.

In 1972 they moved from ramp 18 to the middle sector of the stadium. That year its hymn was created, inspired by the Italian movie "For Love and Gold". In that period many Italian ultras groups identified themselves with political ideas. In the early years of the Fossa Dei Leoni's existence, most of its members shared left-wing ideas, and then over time the curve moved closer to right-wing ideas. The Fossa dei Leoni and, more generally, the entire Curva Sud Milano, however, have always wanted to keep their political ideas away from football; in fact, a banner has often been displayed that reads "né rossi né neri, solo rossoneri" meaning neither red (communist ideas) nor black (fascist ideas), only rossoneri (literally red and black). Despite this, flags with Che Guevara or flags with the Celtic cross (a symbol used by neo-fascists) were sometimes displayed in the Curva (however not in the Fossa dei Leoni section).

Disorderly conduct problems from 1975 to 1977 led it to change its name to Inferno Rossonero (Red-Black Hell).

FSD became a model for Italian ultras groups. In 1982 it was cited in the Italian movie "Eccezzziunale... veramente". In that movie, lead actor Diego Abatantuono played the group's leader, named Donato, the ras of the Fossa.

=== Dissolution ===
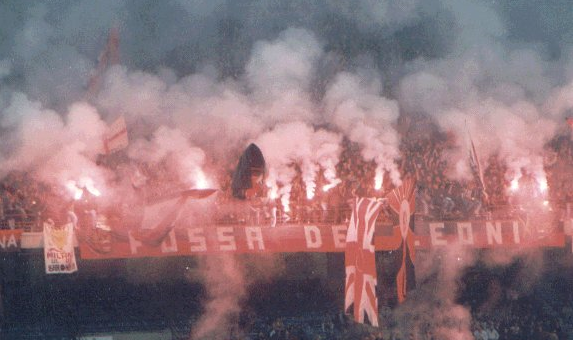
Fossa dei Leoni in action

After 38 years of activity, FSD was officially dissolved on 17 November 2005 by its members due to disputes regarding two stolen banners after the match Milan–Juventus of 29 October 2005. During an internal conflict among Milan's supporters, FDL was accused of collaborating with DIGOS (unacceptable for ultras ideals) to obtain restitution of the banners and some members were threatened and attacked. At the end of that conflict the leaders of the group decided to dissolve the group.

Another point of conflict was due to relationships with two other historical ultras groups of A.C. Milan, Brigate Rossonere and Commandos Tigre, due to its political differences and to a leadership struggle among Milan's supporters. After various attempts to recreate the group, one month later (31 December 2005) the group Guerrieri Ultras Curva Sud Milano was founded, mostly by former members of the Fossa dei Leoni.

== Hymn ==
The FSD hymn is based on to the musical theme of Italian movie "For Love and Gold" (1966), and reads:

"Leoni armati stiam marciando siam la Fossa dei Leon...dei leon.. leon.. leon... leon... leon... siam la Fossa dei Leon! Sangue! Violenza! Fossa dei Leoni!"

== Rivalries and friendships ==
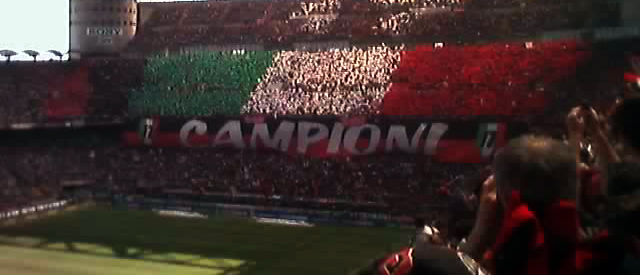
A choreography of AC Milan's supporters for the 17th national title (2003–04)

The FDL formed rivalries and friendships with other AC Milan fan groups.

The principal and the oldest rivalry was against supporters of Inter, the other football club in Milan. Other main rivalries are against supporters of Roma (twinned since early 1980s), S.S.C. Napoli (twinned since early 1980s), Juventus, Lazio, Genoa, Verona, Atalanta, Fiorentina, Sampdoria, and Cagliari.

Their friendships are with the ultras of Brescia, Partizan, CSKA Sofia and Sevilla.

== See also ==
- Tifo and Ultras
- List of ultra groups
- Derby della Madonnina

== Bibliography ==
- "Nella Fossa dei Leoni", (1998)
