= List of Indonesian football transfers 2014 =

This is the list of Indonesia Football player transfers. This list is for 2014 Indonesia Super League and 2014 Liga Indonesia Premier Division season.

Since the 2014 edition, Indonesian FA has applied a new restriction as known as "3+1" format, in which at least 1 of 4 foreign players in every club are originated from Asian countries. Only 3 of them are allowed to play together in a match.

== Winter transfers ==
For Super League winter transfers closed on 28 February and the foreign players registered closed on 15 March 2014.

For Premier Division winter transfers opened on 26 March and closed on 30 April 2014.

Date	Name	Moving from	Moving to
25 September 2013	(Australia) Edmar Garcia	Arema Cronous	Released
27 September 2013	(Indonesia) Engelbert Sani	Arema Cronous	Released
6 October 2013	(Indonesia) Achmad Jufriyanto	Sriwijaya FC	Persib Bandung
6 October 2013	(Indonesia) Tantan	Sriwijaya FC	Persib Bandung
11 October 2013	(Indonesia) Stevie Bonsapia	Persiram Raja Ampat	Perseru Serui
30 October 2013	(Saint Kitts and Nevis) Keith Gumbs	Arema Cronous	Released
2 November 2013	(Indonesia) Dwi Kuswanto	Persiwa Wamena	Persisam Putra Samarinda
7 November 2013	(Indonesia) Hamka Hamzah	Mitra Kukar	(Malaysia) PKNS F.C.
8 November 2013	(Syria) Naser Al Sebai	Persib Bandung	Released
13 November 2013	(Timor-Leste) Diogo Santos	Gresik United	Sriwijaya FC
14 November 2013	(Cameroon) Jean Paul Boumsong	Bhayangkara F.C.	Persisam Putra Samarinda
16 November 2013	(Liberia) Zah Rahan Krangar	Persipura Jayapura	(Malaysia) Felda United
16 November 2013	(Nigeria) Onorionde Kughegbe	Persiwa Wamena	Perseru Serui
16 November 2013	(Indonesia) Abdurahman Lestaluhu	Sriwijaya FC	Bhayangkara F.C.
16 November 2013	(Indonesia) Ambrizal	Gresik United F.C.	Bhayangkara F.C.
16 November 2013	(Indonesia) Jendri Pitoy	Persiram Raja Ampat	Bhayangkara F.C.
16 November 2013	(Indonesia) Novri Setiawan	Sriwijaya FC	Bhayangkara F.C.
16 November 2013	(Indonesia) Vava Mario Yagalo	Sriwijaya FC	Bhayangkara F.C.
16 November 2013	(Indonesia) Zaenal Haq	(Belgium) C.S. Visé	Bhayangkara F.C.
18 November 2013	(Indonesia) Rivky Mokodompit	Sriwijaya FC	Persisam Putra Samarinda
18 November 2013	(Indonesia) Leo Saputra	Persita Tangerang	Bhayangkara F.C.
19 November 2013	(Indonesia) Ravi Murdianto	Perserang Serang	Mitra Kukar
19 November 2013	(Indonesia) Paulo Sitanggang	Jember United	Mitra Kukar
19 November 2013	(Indonesia) David Laly	Persidafon Dafonsoro	Pelita Bandung Raya
19 November 2013	(Argentina) Ezequiel González	Persiba Bantul	Semen Padang FC
20 November 2013	(Indonesia) Valentino Telaubun	Perseman Manokwari	Persisam Putra Samarinda
20 November 2013	(Indonesia) Ferry Rotinsulu	Sriwijaya FC	Bhayangkara F.C.
20 November 2013	(Indonesia) Amin Syarifudin	PSPS Pekanbaru	Persepam Madura United
21 November 2013	(Cameroon) Abanda Herman	Persib Bandung	Barito Putera
21 November 2013	(Indonesia) Anindito Wahyu	Persija Jakarta	Mitra Kukar
21 November 2013	(Indonesia) Bima Sakti	Persepar Palangkaraya	Mitra Kukar
21 November 2013	(Indonesia) Dian Agus	Barito Putera	Mitra Kukar
21 November 2013	(Indonesia) Zulvin Zamrun	Persiba Balikpapan	Mitra Kukar
22 November 2013	(Indonesia) Nopendi	Persiba Bantul	Persepam Madura United
22 November 2013	(Indonesia) Ahmad Bustomi	Mitra Kukar	Arema Cronous
22 November 2013	(Indonesia) Arif Suyono	Mitra Kukar	Arema Cronous
22 November 2013	(Liberia) Erick Lewis	Sriwijaya FC	Mitra Kukar
22 November 2013	(Indonesia) Ferdinand Sinaga	Persisam Putra Samarinda	Persib Bandung
22 November 2013	(Mali) Makan Konaté	Barito Putera	Persib Bandung
22 November 2013	(Mali) Djibril Coulibaly	Barito Putera	Persib Bandung
23 November 2013	(Indonesia) Muhammad Ilham	Persija Jakarta	Bhayangkara F.C.
23 November 2013	(Indonesia) Cornelius Geddy	Persija IPL	Perseru Serui
23 November 2013	(Indonesia) Oktovianus Maniani	Barito Putera	Perseru Serui
24 November 2013	(Indonesia) Engelbert Sani	Free agent	Persisam Putra Samarinda
24 November 2013	(Indonesia) Joko Sasongko	Arema Cronous	Persisam Putra Samarinda
24 November 2013	(Indonesia) Sultan Samma	Gresik United F.C.	Persisam Putra Samarinda
24 November 2013	(Indonesia) Yus Arfandy Dja'far	Persiba Balikpapan	Persisam Putra Samarinda
25 November 2013	(Indonesia) Dedi Kusnandar	Arema Cronous	Bhayangkara F.C.
25 November 2013	(Indonesia) Fandi Eko Utomo	Persela Lamongan	Bhayangkara F.C.
25 November 2013	(Indonesia) Manahati Lestusen	(Belgium) C.S. Visé	Bhayangkara F.C.
25 November 2013	(Indonesia) Hasyim Kipuw	Arema Cronous	Bhayangkara F.C.
26 November 2013	(Indonesia) Legimin Raharjo	Arema IPL	Gresik United F.C.
26 November 2013	(Indonesia) Mahyadi Panggabean	Sriwijaya FC	Gresik United F.C.
26 November 2013	(Indonesia) Fajar Handika	PSPS Pekanbaru	Gresik United F.C.
26 November 2013	(Indonesia) Mahrus Bachtiar	Persijap Jepara	Gresik United F.C.
26 November 2013	(Indonesia) Sukasto Efendi	Persema Malang	Gresik United F.C.
26 November 2013	(Indonesia) Dias Angga	Persisam Putra Samarinda	Pelita Bandung Raya
26 November 2013	(Indonesia) Yosua Pahabol	Semen Padang	Barito Putera
27 November 2013	(Indonesia) Juan Revi	PSS Sleman	Arema Cronous
27 November 2013	(Indonesia) Samsul Arif	Persela Lamongan	Arema Cronous
27 November 2013	(Australia) Mario Karlović	Persebaya 1927	(Malaysia) Terengganu FA
28 November 2013	(Indonesia) Joko Ribowo	Persijap Jepara	Barito Putera
29 November 2013	(Indonesia) Patrich Wanggai	Persipura Jayapura	(Malaysia) T-Team F.C.
29 November 2013	(Indonesia) Aris Alfiansyah	Gresik United F.C.	Persiba Balikpapan
29 November 2013	(Indonesia) Hari Caniago	Persiwa Wamena	Persiba Balikpapan
29 November 2013	(Indonesia) Joko Sidik	Persisam Putra Samarinda	Persiba Balikpapan
29 November 2013	(Indonesia) Riski Novriansyah	Gresik United F.C.	Persiba Balikpapan
29 November 2013	(Indonesia) Dedi Indra	Persela Lamongan	Gresik United F.C.
29 November 2013	(Indonesia) Handi Ramdhan	Persija IPL	Gresik United F.C.
29 November 2013	(Indonesia) Reza Mustofa	Arema Cronous	Gresik United F.C.
30 November 2013	(Indonesia) Eljo Iba	Persinab Nabire	Gresik United F.C.
30 November 2013	(Indonesia) Andik Vermansyah	Persebaya 1927	(Malaysia) Selangor FA
30 November 2013	(Indonesia) Syahroni	Persija Jakarta	Barito Putera
30 November 2013	(Indonesia) Seftia Hadi	Mitra Kukar	Semen Padang FC
December 2013	(Togo) Ali Khaddafi	Persepam Madura United	Perseru Serui
December 2013	(Nigeria) Sunday Oboh	Mojokerto Putra	Perseru Serui
December 2013	(Cameroon) Seme Pattrick	Persiram Raja Ampat	Perseru Serui
December 2013	(Indonesia) Galih Firmansyah	Persiwa Wamena	Perseru Serui
1 December 2013	(Indonesia) Djayusman Triasdi	Persela Lamongan	PSM Makassar
1 December 2013	(Indonesia) Rachmat Latief	Mitra Kukar	PSM Makassar
2 December 2013	(Indonesia) Slamet Nurcahyono	Persiba Bantul	Persepam Madura United
2 December 2013	(Indonesia) Andri Ibo	Persidafon Dafonsoro	Persipura Jayapura
2 December 2013	(Indonesia) Dominggus Fakdawer	Persita Tangerang	Persipura Jayapura
2 December 2013	(Liberia) Boakay Foday	Sriwijaya FC	Persipura Jayapura
2 December 2013	(Indonesia) Titus Bonai	Semen Padang F.C.	Persipura Jayapura
2 December 2013	(Indonesia) Airlangga Sucipto	Persib Bandung	Semen Padang FC
2 December 2013	(Indonesia) Eka Ramdhani	Pelita Bandung Raya	Semen Padang FC
2 December 2013	(Indonesia) Fauzi Toldo	Persisam Putra Samarinda	Sriwijaya FC
2 December 2013	(Indonesia) Selsius Gebze	Persidafon Dafonsoro	Sriwijaya FC
2 December 2013	(Indonesia) Erol Iba	Gresik United F.C.	Sriwijaya FC
2 December 2013	(Indonesia) Siswanto	Gresik United F.C.	Sriwijaya FC
2 December 2013	(Indonesia) Vendry Mofu	Semen Padang F.C.	Sriwijaya FC
2 December 2013	(Ivory Coast) Lancine Koné	Persisam Putra Samarinda	Sriwijaya FC
2 December 2013	(Mali) Abdoulaye Maïga	(France) Gazélec Ajaccio	Sriwijaya FC
2 December 2013	(Indonesia) Asri Akbar	Persib Bandung	Sriwijaya FC
2 December 2013	(Indonesia) Ruben Wuarbanaran	(Belgium) C.S. Visé	Barito Putera
4 December 2013	(Liberia) James Koko Lomell	Persiram Raja Ampat	Barito Putera
4 December 2013	(Indonesia) Ponaryo Astaman	Sriwijaya FC	PSM Makassar
4 December 2013	(Indonesia) Handi Hamzah	PSM Makassar	TBA
4 December 2013	(Latvia) Deniss Romanovs	Pro Duta FC	Pelita Bandung Raya
5 December 2013	(Senegal) Pape N'Diaye	Persidafon Dafonsoro	Gresik United F.C.
5 December 2013	(Indonesia) Ardan Aras	Barito Putera	PSM Makassar
5 December 2013	(Indonesia) Agung Prasetyo	PSMS Medan	PSM Makassar
5 December 2013	(Indonesia) Budi Sudarsono	Persenga Nganjuk	PSM Makassar
5 December 2013	(Indonesia) Markus Horison	Persidafon Dafonsoro	PSM Makassar
5 December 2013	(Indonesia) Muhammad Fakhrudin	Sriwijaya FC	PSM Makassar
5 December 2013	(Indonesia) Syamsidar	Mitra Kukar	PSM Makassar
5 December 2013	(Indonesia) Yusuf Hamzah	Persebaya 1927	PSM Makassar
6 December 2013	(Slovakia) Roman Chmelo	(Malaysia) PKNS FC	PSM Makassar
7 December 2013	(Indonesia) Kim Kurniawan	Free agent	Pelita Bandung Raya
7 December 2013	(Cameroon) Patrice Nzekou	Persiba Balikpapan	Bhayangkara F.C.
7 December 2013	(Japan) Kenji Adachihara	Persib Bandung	PSM Makassar
7 December 2013	(Argentina) Robertino Pugliara	Persija Jakarta	PSM Makassar
7 December 2013	(Indonesia) Dany Saputra	Pro Duta FC	Persija Jakarta
7 December 2013	(Indonesia) Suroso	Bhayangkara F.C.	Persija Jakarta
7 December 2013	(Indonesia) Victor Pae	Persipura Jayapura	Persija Jakarta
8 December 2013	(Indonesia) Tonnie Cusell	(Netherlands) AFC Ajax Amateurs	Barito Putera
9 December 2013	(Indonesia) Alfin Tuasalamony	(Belgium) C.S. Visé	Bhayangkara F.C.
9 December 2013	(Indonesia) Bambang Pamungkas	Free agent	Pelita Bandung Raya
9 December 2013	(Indonesia) Zisva Siswanto	Semen Padang	PSM Makassar
9 December 2013	(Indonesia) Elthon Maran	Persiram Raja Ampat	Gresik United F.C.
10 December 2013	(Indonesia) Maman Abdurrahman	Persib Bandung	Sriwijaya FC
10 December 2013	(Indonesia) Syamsir Alam	(United States) D.C. United	Sriwijaya FC
10 December 2013	(Belgium) Pacho Kenmogne	Persija Jakarta	Bhayangkara F.C.
10 December 2013	(Indonesia) Johan Alfarizi	Persija Jakarta	Arema Cronous
10 December 2013	(Cameroon) Pierre Boya	(Denmark) Randers	Persija Jakarta
10 December 2013	(Indonesia) Suroso	Persija Jakarta	Resigned
11 December 2013	(Montenegro) Vladimir Vujović	(Montenegro) OFK Petrovac	Persib Bandung
11 December 2013	(Serbia) Boban Nikolić	(Serbia) Pobeda Beloševac	Pelita Bandung Raya
13 December 2013	(Indonesia) Sergio van Dijk	Persib Bandung	(Iran) Sepahan
14 December 2013	(Indonesia) Greg Nwokolo	Arema Cronous	Bhayangkara F.C.
14 December 2013	(Indonesia) Ricardo Salampessy	Persipura Jayapura	Bhayangkara F.C.
14 December 2013	(Argentina) Gustavo López	Persela Lamongan	Arema Cronous
14 December 2013	(Indonesia) Agung Supriyanto	Persijap Jepara	Persija Jakarta
14 December 2013	(Indonesia) M. Irfan	PSIM Yogyakarta	PSS Sleman
14 December 2013	(Indonesia) Rasmoyo	Bhayangkara F.C.	PSS Sleman
14 December 2013	(Indonesia) Eli Nasuka	Unknown	PSS Sleman
16 December 2013	(Liberia) Moris Power	PSIS Semarang	PSGC Ciamis
17 December 2013	(Saint Kitts and Nevis) Keith Gumbs	Free agent	Barito Putera
18 December 2013	(Cameroon) Daniel Moncharé	(Morocco) Ittihad Khemisset	Bbayangkara F.C.
18 December 2013	(Indonesia) Maldini Pali	(Uruguay) Deportivo Indonesia	PSM Makassar
18 December 2013	(Indonesia) Muchlis Hadi Ning	Persekap Pasuruan	PSM Makassar
18 December 2013	(Montenegro) Ilija Spasojević	Mitra Kukar	Persisam Putra Samarinda
18 December 2013	(Indonesia) Erik Setiawan	Pelita Bandung Raya	Persisam Putra Samarinda
18 December 2013	(Indonesia) Rio Ramandhika	Persita Tangerang	Persisam Putra Samarinda
18 December 2013	(Indonesia) Ramdhani Lestaluhu	Sriwijaya FC	Persija Jakarta
18 December 2013	(Indonesia) Aang Suparman	Persib Bandung	PSS Sleman
18 December 2013	(Indonesia) Bayu Andra	Yahukimo FC	PSS Sleman
19 December 2013	(Syria) Marwan Sayedeh	Pelita Bandung Raya	(Malaysia) Sabah FA
20 December 2013	(Indonesia) Fahreza Agamal	Persija Jakarta	Martapura FC
20 December 2013	(Indonesia) Isnan Ali	Persidafon Dafonsoro	Martapura FC
20 December 2013	(Indonesia) Alfonsius Kelvan	Persepam Madura United	Pelita Bandung Raya
20 December 2013	(Indonesia) Anggo Yulian	PSS Sleman	Pelita Bandung Raya
20 December 2013	(Indonesia) Choirul Rifan	Arema IPL	Pelita Bandung Raya
20 December 2013	(Indonesia) Fariz Bagus Dinata	Arema IPL	Pelita Bandung Raya
20 December 2013	(Indonesia) Hermawan	Arema IPL	Pelita Bandung Raya
20 December 2013	(Indonesia) Izaac Wanggai	Persidafon Dafonsoro	Persipura Jayapura
20 December 2013	(Indonesia) Jaelani Arey	Persiwa Wamena	Persipura Jayapura
21 December 2013	(Indonesia) Jecky Pasarela	Persepar Palangkaraya	Gresik United F.C.
22 December 2013	(Indonesia) Syakir Sulaiman	Persiba Balikpapan	Sriwijaya FC
23 December 2013	(Nigeria) Osas Saha	Persisam Putra Samarinda	Persiram Raja Ampat
23 December 2013	(Indonesia) Hendriko Kiwak	Persidafon U-21	PSS Sleman
24 December 2013	(Colombia) Raúl Asprilla	Unknown	Persepam Madura United
24 December 2013	(Indonesia) Saktiawan Sinaga	PSMS Medan	PSS Sleman
25 December 2013	(Indonesia) Ortizan Solossa	Persipura Jayapura	Persiram Raja Ampat
26 December 2013	(Indonesia) Egi Melgiansyah	Arema Cronous	Persija Jakarta
26 December 2013	(Indonesia) Budi Sudarsono	PSM Makassar	Released
26 December 2013	(Japan) Kenji Adachihara	PSM Makassar	Released
26 December 2013	(Indonesia) Muhammad Fakhrudin	PSM Makassar	Released
26 December 2013	(Indonesia) Ivo Andre	PON Jateng	PSIS Semarang
27 December 2013	(Indonesia) Aris Alfiansyah	Persela Lamongan	Persiba Balikpapan
27 December 2013	(Indonesia) Basry Lohy	Persepar Palangkaraya	Pelita Bandung Raya
27 December 2013	(Indonesia) Talaohu Musafri	Persebaya 1927	Pelita Bandung Raya
28 December 2013	(Brazil) Otávio Dutra	Persipura Jayapura	Gresik United F.C.
30 December 2013	(Indonesia) Danan Puspito	Persijap Jepara	Mitra Kukar
30 December 2013	(Indonesia) Syamsidar	PSM Makassar	Released
31 December 2013	(Indonesia) Agus Indra	Gresik United F.C.	Pelita Bandung Raya
31 December 2013	(Indonesia) Wildansyah	Persisam Putra Samarinda	Pelita Bandung Raya
January 2014	(Indonesia) Leonard Tupamahu	Pelita Bandung Raya	Persiram Raja Ampat
1 January 2014	(Indonesia) Galih Sudaryono	Persija Jakarta	Persiram Raja Ampat
1 January 2014	(Cameroon) Mbida Messi	Persib Bandung	Persiram Raja Ampat
1 January 2014	(Saint Kitts and Nevis) Keith Gumbs	Barito Putera	Retirement
2 January 2014	(Indonesia) Gunawan Dwi Cahyo	Persijap Jepara	Mitra Kukar
2 January 2014	(Brazil) Reinaldo Lobo	(Brazil) Grêmio Novorizontino	Mitra Kukar
3 January 2014	(Indonesia) Diego Muhammad	Sriwijaya	Mitra Kukar
3 January 2014	(Netherlands) Emile Linkers	Free agent	PSGC Ciamis
3 January 2014	(Liberia) Moris Power	PSIS Semarang	PSGC Ciamis
4 January 2014	(North Macedonia) Goran Gančev	Persebaya 1927	(Bahrain) Busaiteen Club
4 January 2014	(Liberia) Ansu Toure	(Denmark) FC Vestsjælland	Persiba Balikpapan
6 January 2014	(Argentina) Mario Costas	Persela Lamongan	Persija Jakarta
7 January 2014	(Montenegro) Srđan Lopičić	Bhayangkara F.C.	Persela Lamongan
7 January 2014	(Indonesia) Saiful Amar	PSIS Semarang	PSCS Cilacap
7 January 2014	(Indonesia) Agus Purwoko	PSS Sleman	PSCS Cilacap
7 January 2014	(Indonesia) Gunaryo	Persibangga Purbalingga	PSCS Cilacap
8 January 2014	(Singapore) Agu Casmir	Free agent	Bhayangkara F.C.
8 January 2014	(Cameroon) Martial Poungoue Nz	PS Bangka	Martapura FC
10 January 2014	(Spain) Addison Alves	PSIS Semarang	Persela Lamongan
10 January 2014	(Indonesia) Yaris Riyadi	PSGC Ciamis	Released
10 January 2014	(Indonesia) Eki Nurhakim	PSGC Ciamis	Released
10 January 2014	(Indonesia) Suhandi	PSAD	PSGC Ciamis
10 January 2014	(Indonesia) Erwin	PSAD	PSGC Ciamis
16 January 2014	(Mali) Djibril Coulibaly	Persib Bandung	Released
16 January 2014	(Cameroon) Christian Lenglolo	PSIR Rembang	Persijap Jepara
16 January 2014	(Nigeria) Udo Fortune	(Israel) Ramat HaSharon	Persib Bandung
16 January 2014	(Indonesia) Fandy Mochtar	Sriwijaya FC	Persiba Balikpapan
17 January 2014	(Nigeria) Michael Onwatuegwu	Perseman Manokwari	Persik Kediri
17 January 2014	(Cameroon) Jean Paul Boumsong	Persisam Putra Samarinda	Released
17 January 2014	(Argentina) Marcelo Cirelli	Free agent	Persis Solo
18 January 2014	(Chile) Cristian Febre	PSM Makassar	Released
18 January 2014	(Cameroon) Guy Junior	Persepam Madura United	Released
18 January 2014	(Colombia) Raúl Asprilla	Persepam Madura United	Released
18 January 2014	(Indonesia) Uston Nawawi	Bhayangkara F.C.	Persida Sidoarjo
21 January 2014	(Nigeria) Udo Fortune	Persib Bandung	Released
21 January 2014	(Mali) Franck Bezi	Persiba Balikpapan	Released
22 January 2014	(Indonesia) Johan Juansyah	Persija Jakarta	Persikabo Bogor
23 January 2014	(Cameroon) Guy Junior	Free agent	PSS Sleman
23 January 2014	(Argentina) Fernando Soler	Free agent	Persiba Balikpapan
23 January 2014	(Paraguay) Carlos Ozuna	(Paraguay) Sport Colombia	Persiba Balikpapan
23 January 2014	(Australia) Michael Baird	(Romania) Universitatea Craiova	PSM Makassar
23 January 2014	(Indonesia) Nico Malau	Free agent	Persiba Balikpapan
24 January 2014	(Paraguay) Sílvio Escobar	(Paraguay) Fernando de la Mora	Persepam Madura United
25 January 2014	(Cameroon) Frank Ongfiang	(Angola) Benfica Luanda	Sriwijaya FC
25 January 2014	(Indonesia) Dimas Sumantri	Free agent	PSMS Medan
27 January 2014	(Timor-Leste) Diogo Santos	Sriwijaya FC	Released
27 January 2014	(Cameroon) Daniel Moncharé	Bhayangkara F.C.	Released
27 January 2014	(Indonesia) Yanuar Tri Firmanda	Free agent	Perseru Serui
27 January 2014	(Indonesia) Zulfiandi	PSSB Bireuen	PSM Makassar
28 January 2014	(Nigeria) Onorionde Kughegbe	Free agent	Bhayangkara F.C.
29 January 2014	(Croatia) Ivan Bošnjak	Brunei DPMM FC	Persija Jakarta
29 January 2014	(Indonesia) Gilbert Duaramuri	Persipura U-21	Persija Jakarta
29 January 2014	(Syria) Naser Al Sebai	Free agent	Persisam Putra Samarinda
29 January 2014	(Uzbekistan) Pavel Solomin	(Uzbekistan) Shurtan Guzar	Persisam Putra Samarinda
29 January 2014	(Argentina) Mario Costas	Persija Jakarta	PSM Makassar
30 January 2014	(Cameroon) Jean Paul Boumsong	Free agent	Persik Kediri
30 January 2014	(Cameroon) Ngon Mamoun	Free agent	Persik Kediri
31 January 2014	(Mali) Djibril Coulibaly	Free agent	Persib Bandung
31 January 2014	(Indonesia) Stevie Bonsapia	Free agent	Semen Padang FC
1 February 2014	(Nigeria) Udo Fortune	Free agent	Persiba Bantul
1 February 2014	(Cameroon) Ngon A Djam	Persika Karawang	Persiba Bantul
2 February 2014	(Ivory Coast) Siakan Dembele	Free agent	Persip Pekalongan
2 February 2014	(Mali) Sanau Salia	Persis Solo	Persip Pekalongan
4 February 2014	(Indonesia) Wiganda Pradika	PSMS Medan	PS Kwarta
4 February 2014	(Indonesia) Muhammad Anthony	PSMS IPL	PS Kwarta
4 February 2014	(Indonesia) Junaedi	Arema IPL	PS Kwarta
4 February 2014	(Indonesia) Rony Beroperay	Persiram Raja Ampat	Persipura Jayapura
4 February 2014	(Indonesia) Lerby Eliandry	Persisam Putra Samarinda	Martapura FC
12 February 2014	(Slovakia) Roman Chmelo	PSM Makassar	Released
17 February 2014	(Indonesia) Muhammad Yunus	Persitema Temanggung	PSIS Semarang
17 February 2014	(Indonesia) Boas Atururi	Perseru Serui	PSIS Semarang
18 February 2014	(Indonesia) Aji Saka	PSS Sleman	Persepam Madura United
19 February 2014	(Indonesia) Rendi Ramang	Free agent	Arema Cronous
20 February 2014	(Indonesia) Muhammad	Persekabpas Pasuruan	Arema Cronous
21 February 2014	(Ivory Coast) Boman Irie Aimé	(Ivory Coast) S.O.A.	PSM Makassar
27 February 2014	(Cameroon) Patrice Nzekou	Bhayangkara F.C.	Released
27 February 2014	(Indonesia) Leo Saputra	Bhayangkara F.C.	Released
27 February 2014	(Sierra Leone) Shaka Bangura	Barito Putera	Released
28 February 2014	(Paraguay) Juan Acuña	Free agent	Barito Putera
28 February 2014	(Bosnia and Herzegovina) Želimir Terkeš	(Malaysia) Perak FA	Persija Jakarta
28 February 2014	(Indonesia) Leo Saputra	Free agent	Persita Tangerang
28 February 2014	(Indonesia) Andika Asruri	Free agent	Persijap Jepara
28 February 2014	(Indonesia) Boy Jati Asmara	Free agent	Persijap Jepara
28 February 2014	(Indonesia) Cucu Hidayat	Free agent	Persijap Jepara
28 February 2014	(South Korea) Han Dong-Won	Free agent	Persijap Jepara
28 February 2014	(Indonesia) I Made Wirahadi	Free agent	Perseru Serui
28 February 2014	(Cameroon) Jean Paul Boumsong	Persik Kediri	Released
28 February 2014	(Nigeria) Udo Fortune	Free agent	Persik Kediri
4 March 2014	(Indonesia) Yericho Christiantoko	Arema Cronous	Persekam Metro
6 March 2014	(Paraguay) Julio Larrea	Free agent	Bhayangkara F.C.
12 March 2014	(Liberia) Roberto Kwateh	Free agent	PSCS Cilacap
15 March 2014	(South Korea) Han Dong-Won	Persijap Jepara	Released
15 March 2014	(Cameroon) Christian Lenglolo	Persijap Jepara	Released
15 March 2014	(Indonesia) Rizky Yulian	Persijap Jepara	Released
15 March 2014	(Indonesia) Hamka	Persijap Jepara	Released
18 March 2014	(Argentina) Julio Alcorsé	Free agent	PSIS Semarang
18 March 2014	(Argentina) Jorge Roberto	Free agent	PS Kwarta
20 March 2014	(Brazil) Antônio Cláudio	(Thailand) Chiangrai United	Villa 2000
20 March 2014	(Paraguay) Jorge Paredes	Madiun Putra	Villa 2000
21 March 2014	(Indonesia) Maman Abdurrahman	Sriwijaya FC	Released
24 March 2014	(Brazil) Evandro	Mojokerto Putra	Sumbawa Barat
24 March 2014	(Cameroon) Tássio Bako	PPSM Sakti Magelang	Sumbawa Barat
29 March 2014	(Cameroon) Mbom Mbom Julien	Persika Karawang	Persis Solo
1 April 2014	(Indonesia) Guntur Pranata	Gumarang	PSMS Medan
1 April 2014	(Indonesia) Perianda Diki	PS PTPN III	PSMS Medan
1 April 2014	(Indonesia) Harian	Pertamina Medan	PSMS Medan
1 April 2014	(Indonesia) Rahmad	PSAP Sigli	PSMS Medan
1 April 2014	(Indonesia) Syamsul Kamal	Persidi Idi	PSMS Medan
1 April 2014	(Indonesia) Adi Gamal	PSLS Lhokseumawe	PSMS Medan
1 April 2014	(Indonesia) Nanda Zulmi	PSAP Sigli	PSMS Medan
1 April 2014	(Indonesia) Ade Irawan	Gumarang	PSMS Medan
1 April 2014	(Indonesia) Abdi Nasution	Sinar Belawan	PSMS Medan
1 April 2014	(Indonesia) Bambang Suprapto	Sinar Belawan	PSMS Medan
1 April 2014	(Indonesia) Ridwan Effendi	Sinar Belawan	PSMS Medan
1 April 2014	(Indonesia) Enjang Rohiman	Persikab Bandung	PSMS Medan
1 April 2014	(Indonesia) Faisal Lubis	Sinar Belawan	PSMS Medan
1 April 2014	(Indonesia) Zulfikar Lubis	PPLP Sumut	PSMS Medan
1 April 2014	(Indonesia) Muhammad Elmi	Sinar Belawan	PSMS Medan
1 April 2014	(Indonesia) Ronald Sinaga	Gumarang	PSMS Medan
1 April 2014	(Indonesia) Dwi Syahputra	PPLP Sumut	PSMS Medan
1 April 2014	(Indonesia) Ainal Ikram	Sinar Belawan	PSMS Medan
1 April 2014	(Indonesia) Noval	OD Sibolga	PSMS Medan
1 April 2014	(Indonesia) Sutrisno	Sinar Belawan	PSMS Medan
1 April 2014	(Indonesia) Yoseph Malau	Semen Padang FC	PSMS Medan
1 April 2014	(Indonesia) Mahadi Rais	Garuda Sakti	PSMS Medan
1 April 2014	(Indonesia) Putra Habibi	Bhayangkara F.C.	PSMS Medan
2 April 2014	(Paraguay) Jorge Paredes	Villa 2000	Released
3 April 2014	(Cameroon) Jean Paul Boumsong	Persik Kediri	Persikad Depok
3 April 2014	(Chile) Patricio Jimenez	Free agent	Persikad Depok
6 April 2014	(Nigeria) Gbeneme Friday	(India) Shillong Lajong	Villa 2000
8 April 2014	(Guinea) Mamandou Diallo	PPSM Sakti Magelang	Persih Tembilahan
8 April 2014	(Indonesia) Gangga Mudana	Free agent	Pusamania Borneo
8 April 2014	(Indonesia) Usep Munandar	Free agent	Pusamania Borneo
8 April 2014	(Indonesia) Akbar Rasyid	Free agent	Pusamania Borneo
24 April 2014	(Indonesia) Tonnie Cusell	Barito Putera	Free agent
24 April 2014	(Indonesia) Ruben Wuarbanaran	Barito Putera	Free agent

2014 Premier Division transfers

== Summer transfers ==
For Super League summer transfers opened on May 5 and closed in June 2014.

For Premier Division summer transfers opened on 19 May and closed on 6 June 2014.

Date	Name	Moving from	Moving to
4 May 2014	(Indonesia) Syaiful Amri	Persepam Madura United	Released
4 May 2014	(Indonesia) Aji Saka	Persepam Madura United	Released
4 May 2014	(Cameroon) Alain N'Kong	Persepam Madura United	Released
4 May 2014	(Indonesia) Rudi Rega	Persepam Madura United	Released
4 May 2014	(Indonesia) Achmad Rifai	Persepam Madura United	Released
4 May 2014	(Indonesia) Ervan Hidayatullah	Persepam Madura United	Released
4 May 2014	(Indonesia) Boy	Persepam Madura United	Released
4 May 2014	(Indonesia) Moh. Said	Persepam Madura United	Released
4 May 2014	(Indonesia) Khokok Roniarto	Persepam Madura United	Released
6 May 2014	(Iran) Vali Khorsandipish	Sriwijaya FC	Released
7 May 2013	(Singapore) Agu Casmir	Bhayangkara F.C.	Released
7 May 2013	(Paraguay) Julio Larrea	Bhayangkara F.C.	Released
7 May 2013	(Indonesia) F.X. Yanuar	Persita Tangerang	Released
7 May 2013	(Indonesia) Wijay	Persita Tangerang	Released
7 May 2013	(Nigeria) Osas Saha	Persiram Raja Ampat	Semen Padang FC
7 May 2013	(Indonesia) Valentino Telaubun	Persita Tangerang	Semen Padang FC
7 May 2013	(Argentina) Ezequiel González	Semen Padang FC	Persiba Bantul
7 May 2014	(Indonesia) Stevie Bonsapia	Semen Padang FC	Persiba Bantul
7 May 2013	(Indonesia) Wahyu Wijiastanto	Semen Padang FC	Persiba Bantul
7 May 2013	(Indonesia) Aldi Rinaldi	Semen Padang FC	Kalteng Putra
8 May 2013	(Indonesia) Agung Suprayogi	Persela Lamongan	Deltras Sidoarjo
8 May 2013	(Indonesia) Hari Novian	Persih Tembilahan	Persita Tangerang
8 May 2013	(Indonesia) Satrio Syam	Free agent	Persita Tangerang
8 May 2013	(Turkmenistan) Mekan Nasyrow	(Turkmenistan) Merw FT	Barito Putera
8 May 2013	(Indonesia) Syamsidar	Mitra Kukar	Barito Putera
8 May 2013	(Paraguay) Juan Acuña	Barito Putera	Released
8 May 2014	(Indonesia) Johan Ibo	Persiba Bantul	Released
8 May 2014	(Cameroon) Ngon A Djam	Persiba Bantul	Released
8 May 2014	(Brazil) Eduardo Bizarro	Persiba Bantul	Released
8 May 2014	(Indonesia) Didik Ariyanto	Persiba Bantul	Released
8 May 2014	(Indonesia) Mochammad Solechudin	Persiba Bantul	Released
8 May 2014	(Indonesia) Yosep Marandof	Persiba Bantul	Released
8 May 2014	(Indonesia) Muhammad Yasir	Persiba Bantul	Released
8 May 2014	(Nigeria) George Oyedepo	Free agent	Persiba Bantul
8 May 2014	(Indonesia) M. Barep	Free agent	Persiba Bantul
11 May 2013	(Indonesia) Yosua Pahabol	Barito Putera	Released
11 May 2013	(Indonesia) Noor Hadi	Persijap Jepara	Barito Putera
12 May 2013	(Argentina) Mario Costas	PSM Makassar	Released
12 May 2013	(Argentina) Robertino Pugliara	PSM Makassar	Released
12 May 2013	(Bosnia and Herzegovina) Želimir Terkeš	Persija Jakarta	Released
12 May 2013	(Argentina) Gustavo Chena	Free agent	Gresik United
13 May 2013	(Nigeria) Michael Onwatuegwu	Persik Kediri	Released
13 May 2013	(Indonesia) Dicky Firasat	Persik Kediri	Released
13 May 2013	(Indonesia) Herman Romansyah	Persik Kediri	Released
13 May 2013	(Indonesia) Sofyan Efendi	Persik Kediri	Released
12 May 2013	(Cameroon) Patrice Nzekou	Free agent	Persiba Balikpapan
15 May 2014	(Indonesia) Muhammad Isnaini	Persiba Bantul	Persepam Madura United
15 May 2014	(Indonesia) Muhammad Yusuf	Semen Padang FC	Persepam Madura United
15 May 2014	(Indonesia) Irvan Mofu	Persita Tangerang	Persepam Madura United
15 May 2014	(Moldova) Eduard Văluţă	Free agent	Persepam Madura United
15 May 2014	(Paraguay) Diego Fretes	Free agent	Persepam Madura United
15 May 2014	(Paraguay) José Jara	Persepam Madura United	Released
15 May 2014	(Paraguay) Pedro Velázquez	(Colombia) Fortaleza F.C.	Gresik United
15 May 2014	(Senegal) Pape N'Diaye	Gresik United	Released
15 May 2014	(Indonesia) Handi Ramdhan	Gresik United	Released
15 May 2014	(Indonesia) Fajar Handika	Gresik United	Released
15 May 2014	(Indonesia) Aries Tuansyah	Gresik United	Released
15 May 2014	(Indonesia) Elthon Maran	Gresik United	Persiram Raja Ampat
15 May 2014	(Indonesia) Isak Konon	Persidafon Dafonsoro	Persiram Raja Ampat
16 May 2013	(Argentina) Fernando Soler	Persiba Balikpapan	Borneo FC
16 May 2013	(Indonesia) Ari Supriatna	Bhayangkara F.C.	Borneo FC
16 May 2013	(Burkina Faso) Mahamadi Ilbouedo	Borneo FC	Released
17 May 2014	(Indonesia) Jimmy Suparno	Gresik United	Persela Lamongan
17 May 2013	(Nigeria) Sunday Oboh	Perseru Serui	Released
17 May 2013	(Cameroon) Jean Paul Boumsong	Free agent	Perseru Serui
17 May 2013	(Indonesia) Sugiono Sihombing	Free agent	Perseru Serui
18 May 2013	(Mali) Franck Bezi	Free agent	Persik Kediri
18 May 2013	(Indonesia) Ramadhan Saputra	Persiba Bantul	Persik Kediri
18 May 2014	(Indonesia) Sandi Firmansyah	Gresik United	Persik Kediri
18 May 2014	(Indonesia) Khokok Roniarto	Free agent	Persik Kediri
18 May 2014	(Indonesia) Sugeng Wahyudi	Free agent	Persik Kediri
18 May 2013	(Liberia) John Tarkpor	Free agent	Persijap Jepara
18 May 2013	(Argentina) Carlos Sciucatti	Free agent	Persijap Jepara
19 May 2013	(Mali) Mamadou Diallo	Persih Tembilahan	PSM Makassar
19 May 2013	(Liberia) Boakay Foday	Persipura Jayapura	Persija Jakarta
19 May 2013	(Argentina) Robertino Pugliara	Free agent	Persipura Jayapura
2 June 2013	(Japan) Atsushi Yonezawa	(India) Royal Wahingdoh	Persiba Bantul

Notes

1. Comeback from Loan (CL) : Players join back to his home club after a loan at another club last season.
2. Loan (L) : Players on loan.
