= 2014 Indonesia Super League statistics =

This is a list of players' statistics for 2014 Indonesia Super League. It consists of lists of goal-scorers, hat-tricks, own goals, clean sheets and disciplines.

== Scoring ==
- First goal of the season: Lukas Mandowen for Persipura Jayapura against Persela Lamongan (1 February 2014)
- Fastest goal of the season: 20 seconds - Lukas Mandowen for Persipura Jayapura against Persebaya ISL (Bhayangkara) (15 April 2014)
- Last goal of the season:
- Widest winning margin: 5 goals
  - Arema Cronus 5–0 Persik Kediri (6 February 2014)
  - Putra Samarinda 5–0 Perseru Serui (9 February 2014)
  - Arema Cronus 5–0 Gresik United (8 May 2014)
  - Persib Bandung 5-0 Persijap Jepara (August 19, 2014)
- Highest scoring game: 7 goals
  - Persiba Bantul 2–5 Persipura Jayapura (2 May 2014)
- Most goals scored in a match by a single team: 5 goals
  - Arema Cronus 5–0 Persik Kediri (6 February 2014)
  - Putra Samarinda 5–0 Perseru Serui (9 February 2014)
  - Mitra Kukar 5–1 Persela Lamongan (20 February 2014)
  - Persik Kediri 5–1 Sriwijaya (26 April 2014)
  - Persiba Bantul 2–5 Persipura Jayapura (2 May 2014)
  - Arema Cronus 5–0 Gresik United (8 May 2014)
  - Persib Bandung 5-0 Persijap Jepara (August 19, 2014)
- Most goals scored in a match by a losing team: 2 goals
  - Gresik United 3–2 Persijap Jepara (6 February 2014)
  - Persita Tangerang 3–2 Gresik United (10 February 2014)
  - Perseru Serui 3–2 Persiba Balikpapan (23 February 2014)
  - Persib Bandung 3–2 Arema Cronus (13 April 2014)
  - Persiba Bantul 2–5 Persipura Jayapura (2 May 2014)
  - Sriwijaya 4–2 Barito Putera (4 May 2014)
  - Persiba Bantul 2–3 Persela Lamongan (2 June 2014)
  - Persita Tangerang 2–4 Semen Padang (7 June 2014)
- Widest home winning margin: 5 goals
  - Arema Cronus 5–0 Persik Kediri (6 February 2014)
  - Putra Samarinda 5–0 Perseru Serui (9 February 2014)
  - Arema Cronus 5–0 Gresik United (8 May 2014)
  - Persib Bandung 5-0 Persijap Jepara (August 19, 2014)
- Widest away winning margin: 4 goals
  - Persita Tangerang 0–4 Persija Jakarta (12 June 2014)
- Most goals scored by a home team: 5 goals
  - Arema Cronus 5–0 Persik Kediri (6 February 2014)
  - Putra Samarinda 5–0 Perseru Serui (9 February 2014)
  - Mitra Kukar 5–1 Persela Lamongan (20 February 2014)
  - Persik Kediri 5–1 Sriwijaya (26 April 2014)
  - Arema Cronus 5–0 Gresik United (8 May 2014)
  - Persib Bandung 5-0 Persijap Jepara (August 19, 2014)
- Most goals scored by an away team: 5 goals
  - Persiba Bantul 2–5 Persipura Jayapura (2 May 2014)

== Team records ==
- Longest winning run: 5
  - Arema Cronus
- Longest unbeaten run: 16
  - Persipura Jayapura
- Longest winless run: 9
  - Persijap Jepara
- Longest losing run: 9
  - Persijap Jepara
- Longest clean sheet run: 5
  - Arema Cronus

== Top scorers ==
Rank	Scorer	Club	Goals(P.G)
1	(Cameroon) Pacho Kenmogne	Bhayangkara F.C.	13(2)
2	(Indonesia) Greg Nwokolo	Bhayangkara F.C.	9
2	(Montenegro) Ilija Spasojević	Putra Samarinda	9(1)
4	(Liberia) James Lomell	Barito Putera	8(1)
4	(Indonesia) Anindito Wahyu	Mitra Kukar	8
4	(Indonesia) Ferdinand Sinaga	Persib Bandung	8
4	(Indonesia) Ramdhani Lestaluhu	Persija Jakarta	8
8	(Argentina) Gustavo López	Arema Cronus	7(2)
8	(Paraguay) Sílvio Escobar	Madura United	7(2)
8	(Argentina) Esteban Vizcarra	Semen Padang	7(3)
11	(Brazil) Beto	Arema Cronus	6
11	(Indonesia) Cristian Gonzáles	Arema Cronus	6
11	(Indonesia) Samsul Arif	Arema Cronus	6
11	(Cameroon) Herman Dzumafo	Mitra Kukar	6
11	(Brazil) Addison Alves	Persela Lamongan	6(1)
11	(Mali) Djibril Coulibaly	Persib Bandung	6
11	(Mali) Makan Konaté	Persib Bandung	6(4)
11	(Liberia) Ansu Toure	Persiba Balikpapan	6(2)
11	(Indonesia) Boaz Solossa	Persipura Jayapura	6
11	(Cameroon) Mbida Messi	Persiram Raja Ampat	6(3)
11	(Nigeria) Osas Saha	Semen Padang (5); Persiram Raja Ampat (1)	6(1)
11	(Ivory Coast) Lancine Koné	Sriwijaya	6(1)
23	(Indonesia) Syahroni	Barito Putera	5
23	(Liberia) Erick Lewis	Mitra Kukar	5
23	(Indonesia) Zulham Zamrun	Mitra Kukar	5(1)
23	(Montenegro) Srđan Lopičić	Persela Lamongan	5(1)
23	(Cameroon) Ngon Mamoun	Persik Kediri	5(3)
23	(Indonesia) Ian Kabes	Persipura Jayapura	5(2)
23	(Japan) Kenji Adachihara	Persita Tangerang	5(1)
23	(Indonesia) Sirvi Arvani	Persita Tangerang	5
23	(Indonesia) Ponaryo Astaman	PSM Makassar	5(4)
32	(Indonesia) Reza Mustofa	Gresik United	4
32	(Indonesia) Bijahil Chalwa	Persela Lamongan	4
32	(Cameroon) Émile Mbamba	Persiba Bantul	4
32	(Croatia) Ivan Bošnjak	Persija Jakarta	4(2)
32	(Indonesia) Errol Simunapendi	Persiram Raja Ampat	4
32	(Indonesia) Airlangga Sucipto	Semen Padang	4
32	(Indonesia) Muhammad Nur Iskandar	Semen Padang	4
32	(Indonesia) Vendry Mofu	Sriwijaya	4
40	(Indonesia) Noor Hadi	Barito Putera (1); Persijap Jepara (2)	3
40	(Indonesia) Rossy Noprihanis	Madura United	3
40	(Indonesia) Zaenal Arif	Madura United	3(1)
40	(Argentina) Gaston Castaño	Pelita Bandung Raya	3(2)
40	(Indonesia) Alfin Tuasalamony	Bhayangkara F.C.	3(2)
40	(Indonesia) Arif Ariyanto	Persela Lamongan	3
40	(Indonesia) Zaenal Arifin	Persela Lamongan	3
40	(Indonesia) Yoksan Ama	Perseru Serui	3
40	(Argentina) Fernando Soler	Persiba Balikpapan	3
40	(Cameroon) Ngon A Djam	Persiba Bantul	3(1)
40	(Indonesia) Ugik Sugiyanto	Persiba Bantul	3
40	(Liberia) Boakay Foday	Persija Jakarta (2); Persipura Jayapura (1)	3(1)
40	(Indonesia) Victor Pae	Persija Jakarta	3
40	(Nigeria) Udo Fortune	Persik Kediri	3
40	(Indonesia) Lukas Mandowen	Persipura Jayapura	3
40	(Indonesia) Bayu Gatra	Putra Samarinda	3
40	(Indonesia) Joko Sasongko	Putra Samarinda	3
40	(Indonesia) Asri Akbar	Sriwijaya	3
58	(Indonesia) Sunarto	Arema Cronus	2
58	(Cameroon) Thierry Gathuessi	Arema Cronus	2
58	(Cameroon) Abanda Herman	Barito Putera	2
58	(Indonesia) Yongki Aribowo	Barito Putera	2
58	(Indonesia) Kacung Khoirul	Gresik United	2
58	(Brazil) Otávio Dutra	Gresik United	2(2)
58	(Paraguay) Pedro Velázquez	Gresik United	2
58	(Japan) Shohei Matsunaga	Gresik United	2
58	(Indonesia) Ishak Djober	Madura United	2
58	(Paraguay) José Jara	Madura United	2
58	(Indonesia) Slamet Nurcahyo	Madura United	2
58	(Indonesia) Bambang Pamungkas	Pelita Bandung Raya	2
58	(Serbia) Boban Nikolić	Pelita Bandung Raya	2
58	(Indonesia) David Laly	Pelita Bandung Raya	2
58	(Indonesia) Talaohu Musafri	Pelita Bandung Raya	2
58	(Togo) Ali Khaddafi	Perseru Serui	2
58	(Indonesia) Arthur Bonai	Perseru Serui	2
58	(Indonesia) Oktovianus Maniani	Perseru Serui	2
58	(Cameroon) Seme Pattrick	Perseru Serui	2(1)
58	(Indonesia) Atep	Persib Bandung	2
58	(Indonesia) Firman Utina	Persib Bandung	2
58	(Indonesia) Muhammad Kamri	Persiba Balikpapan	2
58	(Senegal) Pape N'Diaye	Persiba Balikpapan (1); Gresik United (1)	2
58	(Argentina) Ezequiel González	Persiba Bantul (2); Semen Padang (0)	2

Rank	Scorer	Club	Goals(P.G)
58	(Indonesia) Rachmat Afandi	Persija Jakarta	2
58	(Brazil) Claudinho	Persijap Jepara	2(1)
58	(Indonesia) Danial	Persijap Jepara	2
58	(Indonesia) Qischil Minny	Persik Kediri	2
58	(Indonesia) Syaiful Cahya	Persik Kediri	2
58	(Cameroon) Bio Paulin	Persipura Jayapura	2
58	(Indonesia) Yohanes Pahabol	Persipura Jayapura	2
58	(Indonesia) Jalwandi	Persita Tangerang	2
58	(Chile) Luis Durán	Persita Tangerang	2(1)
58	(Australia) Michael Baird	PSM Makassar	2(1)
58	(Indonesia) Muhammad Rachmat	PSM Makassar	2
58	(Indonesia) Lerby Eliandry	Putra Samarinda	2
58	(Uzbekistan) Pavel Solomin	Putra Samarinda	2
58	(Indonesia) Rahel Radiansyah	Putra Samarinda	2
58	(Indonesia) Sultan Samma	Putra Samarinda	2
58	(Indonesia) Hendra Bayauw	Semen Padang	2
58	(Indonesia) Anis Nabar	Sriwijaya	2
58	(Indonesia) Syakir Sulaiman	Sriwijaya	2
98	(Indonesia) Ahmad Bustomi	Arema Cronus	1
98	(Indonesia) Johan Alfarizi	Arema Cronus	1
98	(Indonesia) Amirul Mukminin	Barito Putera	1
98	(Indonesia) Dedi Hartono	Barito Putera	1
98	(Indonesia) Rizky Ripora	Barito Putera	1
98	(Indonesia) Ade Suhendra	Madura United	1
98	(Indonesia) Aditya Putra Dewa	Madura United	1
98	(Indonesia) Busari	Madura United	1
98	(Indonesia) Denny Rumba	Madura United	1
98	(Moldova) Eduard Văluţă	Madura United	1
98	(Indonesia) Dedi Gusmawan	Mitra Kukar	1
98	(Indonesia) Jajang Mulyana	Mitra Kukar	1
98	(Brazil) Reinaldo Lobo	Mitra Kukar	1
98	(Indonesia) Zulvin Zamrun	Mitra Kukar	1
98	(Indonesia) Agus Indra Kurniawan	Pelita Bandung Raya	1
98	(Indonesia) Kim Kurniawan	Pelita Bandung Raya	1
98	(Indonesia) Nova Arianto	Pelita Bandung Raya	1
98	(Indonesia) Rizky Pellu	Pelita Bandung Raya	1
98	(Indonesia) Wawan Febrianto	Pelita Bandung Raya	1
98	(Indonesia) Wildansyah	Pelita Bandung Raya	1
98	(Indonesia) Abdul Rahman Lestaluhu	Bhayangkara F.C.	1
98	(Indonesia) Fandi Utomo	Bhayangkara F.C.	1
98	(Indonesia) Muhammad Ilham	Bhayangkara F.C.	1
98	(Nigeria) Onorionde Kughegbe	Bhayangkara F.C.	1
98	(Slovakia) Roman Golian	Persela Lamongan	1
98	(Indonesia) Taufiq Kasrun	Persela Lamongan	1
98	(Indonesia) Alan Aronggear	Perseru Serui	1
98	(Indonesia) Franklin Rumbiak	Perseru Serui	1
98	(Indonesia) I Made Wirahadi	Perseru Serui	1
98	(Cameroon) Jean Paul Boumsong	Perseru Serui (0); Persik Kediri (1)	1
98	(Indonesia) Achmad Jufriyanto	Persib Bandung	1
98	(Indonesia) Muhammad Ridwan	Persib Bandung	1
98	(Indonesia) Tantan	Persib Bandung	1
98	(Paraguay) Carlos Ozuna	Persiba Balikpapan	1
98	(Indonesia) Jejen	Persiba Bantul	1
98	(Indonesia) April Hadi	Persija Jakarta	1
98	(Indonesia) Agung Supriyanto	Persija Jakarta	1
98	(Brazil) Fabiano Beltrame	Persija Jakarta	1
98	(Nepal) Rohit Chand	Persija Jakarta	1
98	(Indonesia) Ahmad Noviandani	Persijap Jepara	1
98	(Argentina) Carlos Sciucatti	Persijap Jepara	1
98	(Indonesia) Cornelis Kaimu	Persijap Jepara	1
98	(Indonesia) Diva Tarkas	Persijap Jepara	1
98	(Indonesia) Dimas Galih	Persik Kediri	1
98	(Indonesia) Faris Aditama	Persik Kediri	1
98	(Nigeria) Michael Onwatuegwu	Persik Kediri	1
98	(Indonesia) Rendy Irawan	Persik Kediri	1
98	(Indonesia) Tamsil	Persik Kediri	1
98	(Indonesia) Gerald Pangkali	Persipura Jayapura	1
98	(Indonesia) Izaac Wanggai	Persipura Jayapura	1
98	(Indonesia) Ricky Kayame	Persipura Jayapura	1
98	(Indonesia) Elthon Maran	Persiram Raja Ampat (0); Gresik United (1)	1
98	(Burkina Faso) Habib Bamogo	Persiram Raja Ampat	1
98	(Indonesia) Steven Imbiri	Persiram Raja Ampat	1
98	(Indonesia) Zikri Akbar	Persita Tangerang	1
98	(Indonesia) Andi Oddang	PSM Makassar	1
98	(Indonesia) Rasyid Bakri	PSM Makassar	1
98	(Syria) Naser Al Sebai	Putra Samarinda	1
98	(Indonesia) Septia Hadi	Semen Padang	1
98	(South Korea) Yoo Hyun-Goo	Semen Padang	1
98	(Indonesia) Valentino Telaubun	Semen Padang (0); Persita Tangerang (1)	1
98	(Cameroon) Frank Ongfiang	Sriwijaya	1

- In Italic is previous club on first half season.

Western leading scorer
Eastern leading scorer

== Own goals ==
Player	Club	Against	Date
(Indonesia) Dodok Anang	Persela Lamongan	Persipura Jayapura	1 February
(Indonesia) Catur Rintang	Persijap Jepara	Persib Bandung	9 February
(Indonesia) Supardi Nasir	Persib Bandung	Semen Padang	16 February
(Indonesia) Ambrizal	Bhayangkara F.C.	Persipura Jayapura	15 April
(Indonesia) Suroso	Persela Lamongan	Putra Samarinda	28 April
(Brazil) Evaldo Silva	Persik Kediri	Persijap Jepara	4 June

== Hat-tricks ==
Player	Club	Against	Result	Date
(Montenegro) Ilija Spasojević	Putra Samarinda	Perseru Serui	5–0	9 February 2014
(Indonesia) Bijahil Chalwa	Persela Lamongan	Bhayangkara F.C.	3-0	10 February 2014
(Cameroon) Herman Dzumafo	Mitra Kukar	Persela Lamongan	5-1	20 February 2014
(Montenegro) Srđan Lopičić	Persela Lamongan	Madura United	3-0	10 March 2014
(Cameroon) Pacho Kenmogne	Bhayangkara F.C.	Madura United	4-1	14 March 2014
(Indonesia) Boaz Solossa	Persipura Jayapura	Persiba Bantul	5-2	2 May 2014
(Indonesia) Samsul Arif	Arema Cronus	Gresik United	5-0	8 May 2014
(Indonesia) Greg Nwokolo	Bhayangkara F.C.	Persiba Balikpapan	4-0	8 June 2014

- ^{4} Player scored 4 goals
- ^{5} Player scored 5 goals

== Clean Sheets ==
A number of 45 goalkeepers had appeared representing 22 clubs this season.

Updated to games played on 7 August 2014.

=== Players ===
Position	Player	Club	Clean sheets	Goals conceded	Match played	Average
1	(Indonesia) Kurnia Meiga	Arema Cronus	10	6	13	0.46
2	(South Korea) Yoo Jae-Hoon	Persipura Jayapura	9	10	16	0.62
3	(Indonesia) Yandri Pitoy	Bhayangkara F.C.	6	4	9	0.44
4	(Indonesia) Andritany Ardhiyasa	Persija Jakarta	6	13	15	0.86
5	(Indonesia) Dian Agus Prasetyo	Mitra Kukar	5	6	9	0.66
6	(Indonesia) Deny Marcel	Persiram Raja Ampat	5	9	10	0.9
7	(Indonesia) Fauzi Toldo	Sriwijaya	5	17	15	1.13
8	(Indonesia) Wawan Hendrawan	Persiba Balikpapan	5	17	13	1.38
9	(Indonesia) Choirul Huda	Persela Lamongan	5	23	15	1.53
10	(Indonesia) Joko Ribowo	Barito Putera	4	9	9	1.0
10	(Latvia) Deniss Romanovs	Pelita Bandung Raya	4	14	14	1.0
12	(Indonesia) Rivky Mokodompit	Putra Samarinda	4	14	13	1.07
13	(Indonesia) Joice Sorongan	Mitra Kukar	3	4	6	0.66
14	(Indonesia) Jandia Eka Putra	Semen Padang	3	8	9	0.88
15	(Indonesia) Ferry Rotinsulu	Bhayangkara F.C.	3	6	6	1.0
16	(Indonesia) I Made Wirawan	Persib Bandung	3	14	13	1.06
17	(Indonesia) Yogi Triana	Persita Tangerang	3	23	15	1.53
18	(Indonesia) Teguh Amiruddin	Perseru Serui	3	24	15	1.6
19	(Indonesia) Galih Sudaryono	Persiram Raja Ampat	2	4	6	0.66
20	(Indonesia) Markus Haris Maulana	PSM Makassar	2	15	10	1.5
21	(Indonesia) Dedi Heryanto	Persijap Jepara	2	21	10	2.1
22	(Indonesia) Dimas Galih Pratama	Persijap Jepara	2	11	5	2.2
23	(Indonesia) Shahar Ginanjar	Persib Bandung	1	0	1	0.0
23	(Indonesia) Adixi Lenzivio	Persija Jakarta	1	0	1	0.0
25	(Indonesia) I Made Wardana	Arema Cronus	1	2	2	1.0
25	(Indonesia) Firmansyah	Madura United	1	3	3	1.0
27	(Indonesia) Teddy Heri Setiawan	Persik Kediri	1	12	8	1.5
28	(Indonesia) Dedi Iman	Barito Putera	1	5	3	1.66
29	(Indonesia) Sukasto Efendi	Gresik United	1	16	9	1.77
30	(Indonesia) Geri Mandagi	Madura United	1	20	11	1.81
31	(Indonesia) Aji Saka	Gresik United	1	4	2	2.0
32	(Indonesia) Hery Prasetyo	Gresik United	1	9	4	2.25
33	(Indonesia) Andi Setiawan	Persiba Bantul	1	7	3	2.33
34	(Indonesia) Fakrurrazi	Semen Padang	0	7	7	1.0
35	(Indonesia) Dwi Kuswanto	Putra Samarinda	0	4	3	1.3
36	(Indonesia) I Ngurah Komang Arya	PSM Makassar	0	4	3	1.33
37	(Indonesia) Usman Pribadi	Persik Kediri	0	7	4	1.75
38	(Indonesia) Aditya Harlan	Barito Putera	0	6	3	2.0
38	(Indonesia) Fauzal Mubaraq	Persiba Balikpapan	0	6	3	2.0
38	(Indonesia) Sandy Firmansyah	Persik Kediri	0	6	3	2.0
38	(Indonesia) Wahyudi	Persik Kediri	0	2	1	2.0
42	(Indonesia) Danang Wihatmoko	Persijap Jepara	0	7	3	2.33
43	(Indonesia) Wahyu Tri Nugroho	Persiba Bantul	0	33	14	2.35
44	(Indonesia) Syamsidar	Barito Putera	0	4	1	4.0
44	(Indonesia) Syaifudin	Madura United	0	4	1	4.0

=== Clubs ===
- Most clean sheets: 11
  - Arema Cronus
- Fewest clean sheets: 0
  - Persiba Bantul

== Discipline ==
=== Player ===
- Most yellow cards: 6
  - Elvis Herawan (Persiram)
  - Gerald Pangkali (Persipura)
- Most red cards: 2
  - Patrice Nzekou (Persiba Balikpapan)
  - Erik Setiawan (Putra Samarinda)
  - Achmad Sumardi (Sriwijaya)

=== Club ===
- Most yellow cards: 45
  - Persiram Raja Ampat
- Most red cards: 5
  - Sriwijaya
