= 2014 Persebaya Surabaya (ISL) season =

Persebaya Surabaya (ISL)
2014 season
- Owner: PT. Mitra Muda Inti Berlian
- Manager: Rahmad Darmawan
- Stadium: Gelora Bung Tomo
- Indonesia Super League: Second round
- Top goalscorer: League: Emmanuel Kenmogne (25); All: Emmanuel Kenmogne (25)
Home colours	Away colours	Third colours

The 2014 season was Persebaya Surabaya (ISL)'s fourth season in the club's football history, first season in Indonesia Super League since their existence in 2010 after the acquisition of league slots and membership from Persikubar West Kutai. They played in the top-flight competition after becoming champion of 2013 Liga Indonesia Premier Division.

== Matches ==
=== Legend ===
Win Draw Lost Postponed

=== Friendlies ===
7 December 2013	Persebaya ISL	0 – 0	PS Fajar	Surabaya
				Stadium: Nanggala Field, Menanggal

13 December 2013	Persebaya ISL	3 – 0	Amarta FC	Surabaya
	Kenmogne 15', 30', 45'			Stadium: Nanggala Field, Menanggal

17 December 2013 2013 East Java Tournament	Persepam Madura Utama	0 – 0	Persebaya ISL	Bangkalan
				Stadium: Gelora Bangkalan Stadium

19 December 2013 2013 East Java Tournament	Persebaya ISL	1 – 0	Persib Bandung	Bangkalan
	Priatna 40'			Stadium: Gelora Bangkalan Stadium

22 December 2013 2013 East Java Tournament	Persebaya ISL	1 – 0	Persela Lamongan	Lamongan
	Kenmogne 70'			Stadium: Surajaya Stadium

24 December 2013 2013 East Java Tournament	Arema Cronus	1 – 0	Persebaya ISL	Surabaya
	Samsul 19'			Stadium: Bumimoro Stadium

12 January 2014 2014 Indonesian Inter Island Cup qualification	Persebaya ISL	2 – 0	Persiba Bantul	Kediri
15:30	Nwokolo 29', 68'			Stadium: Brawijaya Stadium

13 January 2014 2014 Indonesian Inter Island Cup qualification	Gresik United	1 – 3	Persebaya ISL	Kediri
15:30	Pasarella 68'		Nwokolo 69'; Casmir 81', 86'	Stadium: Brawijaya Stadium

15 January 2014 2014 Indonesian Inter Island Cup qualification	Persik Kediri	1 – 0	Persebaya ISL	Kediri
15:30	Aditama 75'			Stadium: Brawijaya Stadium

3 April 2014	Persebaya ISL	4 – 0	Marwiltim	Sidoarjo
	Kenmogne; Larrea; Wahyu			Stadium: Brigif-1 Marinir Gedangan

16 July 2014	Persebaya ISL	4 – 0	Persebo Bondowoso	Sidoarjo
	M. Ilham 12'; Kenmogne 18', 50'; Dany 62'			Stadium: Brigif-1 Marinir Gedangan

21 July 2014	Persebaya ISL	1 – 1	Persatu Tuban	Sidoarjo
	Kenmogne 48'		Nasir (footballer) 57'	Stadium: Brigif-1 Marinir Gedangan

24 July 2014	Persebaya ISL	2 – 0	Gresik United	Sidoarjo
	M. Ilham 45'; M. Ansori 55'			Stadium: Brigif-1 Marinir Gedangan

24 September 2014	Persebaya ISL	2 – 0	81 F.C.	Sidoarjo
	Kenmogne 7', 28'			Stadium: Brigif-1 Marinir Gedangan

26 September 2014	Persebaya ISL	0 – 1	Persela Lamongan	Surabaya
			Addison 28'	Stadium: Gelora Bung Tomo Stadium

=== Indonesia Super League ===
==== First round ====
MD	Date	KO	Stadium	City	Opponent	Result^{4}	Attendance	Goalscorers		Source
MD	Date	KO	Stadium	City	Opponent	Result^{4}	Attendance	Bhayangkara FC	Opponent	Source
1	1 February	15:30	H	Surabaya	Mitra Kukar	2 – 1	14,500	Kenmogne 15', 68' (pen.)	Lewis 18'	
2	5 February	15:30	H	Surabaya	Putra Samarinda	1 – 0	5,025	Nwokolo 81'		
3	10 February	19:00	A	Lamongan	Persela Lamongan	0 – 3	12,000		Chalwa 27', 37', 39'	
4	18 February	15:30	H	Surabaya	Persiram Raja Ampat	1 – 1	1,543	Nwokolo 58'	Simunapendi 34'	
5	22 February	19:00	H	Surabaya	Persiba Bantul	4 – 1	1,123	Nwokolo 33'; Kughegbe 45'; Kenmogne 58'; Tuasalamony 62' (pen.)	Ngon A Djam 16'	
6	9 March		A	Balikpapan	Persiba Balikpapan	0 – 0				
7	14 March		A	Bangkalan	Persepam Madura Utama	4 – 1		Jara 43'	Tuasalamony 11'; Kenmogne 25', 42', 45'	
8	15 April		A	Jayapura	Persipura Jayapura	1 – 2		Kenmogne 12'	Mandowen 1'; Ambrizal 76' (o.g.)	
9	20 April		H	Surabaya	Perseru Serui	4 – 0		Tuasalamony 20'; Nwokolo 50', 66'; Kenmogne 58'		
10	2 May		A	Surabaya	PSM Makassar	2 – 0		Fandi 17'; Kenmogne 48'		
11	20 May		H	Surabaya	PSM Makassar	4 – 0		Kenmogne 16', 82'; Nwokolo 17'; Kenmogne 58'; Lestaluhu 74'		
12	26 May		H	Surabaya	Persipura Jayapura	1 – 1		Kenmogne 32' (pen.)	Boaz 27'	
13	30 May		A	Jayapura	Perseru Serui	1 – 0		M. Ilham 31'		
14	8 June		H	Surabaya	Persiba Balikpapan	4 – 0		Nwokolo 16', 63', 68'; Kenmogne 53'		
15	9 August		A	Sleman	Perseru Serui	3 – 0		Nwokolo 21'; Kenmogne 54'; Tuasalamony 65'		
16	14 August		A	Bantul	Persiba Bantul	5 – 0		Nwokolo 29'; Kenmogne 37', 84', 87'; Pupo 59'		
17	19 August		H	Surabaya	Persela Lamongan	3 – 0		Kenmogne 38', 41', 70'		
18	22 August		H	Surabaya	Persepam Madura Utama	3 – 1		Kenmogne 20' (pen.); Nwokolo 79', 88'	Fretes 30'	
19	2 September		A	Tenggarong	Mitra Kukar	4 – 2		Pupo 3', 49'; Kenmogne 53'; Nwokolo 23', 88'	Dzumafo 21', 66'	
20	5 September		A	Samarinda	Putra Samarinda	0 – 0				

==== Second round ====
6 October 2014 1	Persebaya ISL	1 – 1	Mitra Kukar	Surabaya
	Kughegbe 30'		Dzumafo 83'	Stadium: Gelora Bung Tomo Stadium

10 October 2014 2	Pelita Bandung Raya	0 – 0	Persebaya ISL	Bandung
				Stadium: Si Jalak Harupat Stadium

14 October 2014 3	Persebaya ISL	1 – 1	Persib Bandung	Surabaya
	Supardi 75' (o.g.)		Konaté 11'	Stadium: Gelora Bung Tomo Stadium

22 October 2014 4	Persib Bandung	3 – 1	Persebaya ISL	Bandung
	Konaté 70', 83'; Sinaga 90'		Kenmogne 90+2'	Stadium: Si Jalak Harupat Stadium

26 October 2014 5	Persebaya ISL	1 – 1	Pelita Bandung Raya	Surabaya
	Kenmogne 26'		Agus Indra 57'	Stadium: Gelora Bung Tomo Stadium

10 October 2014 6	Mitra Kukar	3 – 3	Persebaya ISL	Tenggarong
	Maitimo 6' (pen.); Dzumafo 18'; Zulham 51'		Pupo 13', 31'; Kenmogne 36'	Stadium: Aji Imbut Stadium

== League table ==
=== First round ===
East

Pos	Team	Pld	W	D	L	GF	GA	GD	Pts	Qualification or relegation
1	Persebaya ISL (Bhayangkara) (Note: Persebaya ISL (Bhayangkara) three points deducted as a punishment from FIFA because their salary arrears former foreign players they are Serge Ngankou Elongo, they also fined worth 5% each year of the total arrears of salary on the player.)	20	14	4	2	47	13	+34	43	Advance to second round
2	Persipura	20	10	9	1	29	15	+14	39	Advance to second round
3	Mitra Kukar	20	11	4	5	34	18	+16	37	Advance to second round
4	Persela	20	8	4	8	28	33	−5	28	Advance to second round
5	Persiba	20	7	4	9	21	28	−7	25 (Note: Persiba 12 Pts; Putra Samarinda 4 Pts; PSM 1 Pt.)	

Updated to match(es) played on 5 September 2014. Source: ISL table, Source
Rules for classification: 1) points; 2) head-to-head points; 3) head-to-head goal difference; 4) head-to-head goals scored; 5) goal difference; 6) number of goals scored.

=== Second round ===
Group B

Pos	Team	Pld	W	D	L	GF	GA	GD	Pts	Qualification
1	Persib	6	4	1	1	11	7	+4	13	Advance to knockout stage
2	Pelita Bandung Raya	6	2	2	2	4	4	0	8	Advance to knockout stage
3	Mitra Kukar	6	1	2	3	8	10	−2	5 (Note: Tied on head-to-head results and overall goal difference. Overall goals scored is used as the tiebreaker.)	
4	Persebaya ISL (Bhayangkara)	6	0	5	1	7	9	−2	5	

== Statistics ==
=== Squad ===
As of 22 February 2014

No.	Nat.	Name	Pos.	ISL					Total												
No.	Nat.	Name	Pos.	Pen.	Goal	Booked	Second yellow card	Sent off (straight red)	Pen.	Goal	Booked	Second yellow card	Sent off (straight red)								
1	(Indonesia)	Jendri Pitoy	GK	3					3												
2	(Indonesia)	Imam Yulianto	DF																		
3	(Indonesia)	Vava Mario Yagalo	DF																		
4	(Indonesia)	Ricardo Salampessy	DF	4		1			4		1										
5	(Indonesia)	M. Zainal Haq	DF																		
6	(Indonesia)	Achmad Tolle	DF																		
7	(Indonesia)	Abdul Rahman Lestaluhu	MF																		
9	(Indonesia)	Wahyu Subo Seto	MF																		
10	(Indonesia)	Greg Nwokolo (c)	FW	5	3				5	3											
13	(Indonesia)	Akbar Rasyid	MF	1					1												
14	(Cameroon)	Daniel Moncharé	DF																		
20	(Indonesia)	Novri Setiawan	MF	2					2												
23	(Indonesia)	Leo Saputra	DF	4					4												
24	(Paraguay)	Julio Larrea	MF																		
25	(Indonesia)	Manahati Lestusen	MF	5		1			5		1			26	(Indonesia)	Alfin Tuasalamony	DF	5	1	5	1
27	(Indonesia)	Thomas Ryan Bayu	GK																		
29	(Indonesia)	Ambrizal	DF	4		1			4		1										
81	(Indonesia)	Muhammad Ilham	MF	5					5												
99	(Liberia)	Isaac Pupo	MF																		
	(Cameroon)	Marcus Mokaké	MF																		
	(Republic of the Congo)	Yannick Salem	FW																		
Opponent's own goal																					
Total					8	6	0	0		8	6	0	0								
