= Zainal Haq =

Indonesian association footballer

Personal information
- Full name: Muhammad Zainal Haq
- Date of birth: 5 April 1992 (age 34)
- Place of birth: Sidoarjo, Indonesia
- Height: 1.73 m (5 ft 8 in)
- Position: Defender

Team information
- Current team: Persida Sidoarjo
- Number: 23

Youth career
- 2008–2009: Deportivo Indonesia
- 2010: Peñarol

Senior career*
Years	Team	Apps	(Gls)
2012–2013	Visé	0	(0)
2013–2014	Bhayangkara	9	(0)
2015–2017	Persela Lamongan	42	(0)
2018	Kalteng Putra	17	(0)
2018	Aceh United	6	(0)
2019	Badak Lampung	17	(1)
2020	Mitra Kukar	0	(0)
2021	Muba Babel United	9	(0)
2022	Putra Delta Sidoarjo	3	(0)
2023–2024	Bantul United	4	(0)
2025–	Persida Sidoarjo	5	(0)

International career^{‡}
2007–2008	Indonesia U16	8	(0)
2009	Indonesia U19	5	(0)
- * Club domestic league appearances and goals as of 23 January 2025 ‡ National team caps and goals as of 15 April 2015

Muhammad Zainal Haq (born 5 April 1992) is an Indonesian professional footballer who plays as a defender for Liga 4 club Persida Sidoarjo.

== Club career ==
=== Early career ===
In January 2011, Zainal Haq joined Peñarol. Besides Zainal, the Uruguayan club signed two other Indonesian players, Manahati Lestusen and Abdul Lestaluhu. Demis Djamaoeddin (Deportivo Indonesia manager) said "They are already there and introduced to the public".

=== C.S. Visé ===
In April 2011, Zainal joined Belgian club C.S. Visé as part of the Bakrie Group project with Deportivo Indonesia.

=== Persebaya Bhayangkara ===
Zainal Haq joined Persebaya (Bhayangkara) and played at the 2014 Inter Island Cup.

== International career ==
In 2007, Zainal represented the Indonesia U-16 team in the 2008 AFC U-16 Championship qualification phase.
