= Bahrain 10–0 Indonesia =

2014 FIFA World Cup qualification (Asian zone) Group E
Bahrain	Indonesia
(Bahrain)	(Indonesia)
10	0
- Qatar advances to the fourth round of the AFC qualification tournament Bahrain eliminated from World Cup contention
- Date: 29 February 2012
- Venue: Bahrain National Stadium, Riffa, Bahrain
- Referee: Andre El Haddad (Lebanon)
- Attendance: 3,000
- Weather: Clear; 26 °C (79 °F)

On 29 February 2012, the Bahraini and Indonesian national association football teams faced each other in a qualifying match for the 2014 FIFA World Cup. The match was played at the Bahrain National Stadium in Riffa, Bahrain. The match ended as the biggest win for Bahrain, and the biggest defeat for Indonesia. This match is known for a FIFA match-fixing investigation afterwards.

Before this match, Bahrain needed to defeat Indonesia and hope Qatar lost their next match against Iran with a combined ten goal swing in both games to overtake Qatar and qualify for the next round. However, Qatar secured an 83rd-minute equalizer, leaving Bahrain's 10–0 victory insufficient, as Qatar progressed instead.

== Background ==
Prior to the final matchday the table was:

Team	Pld	W	D	L	GF	GA	GD	Pts
Iran	5	3	2	0	15	3	+12	11
Qatar	5	2	3	0	8	3	+5	9
Bahrain	5	1	3	1	3	7	−4	6
Indonesia	5	0	0	5	3	16	−13	0

Before the game, Bahrain required a victory in its match against Indonesia and for Qatar to lose to Iran with a ten goal swing in both games in order to progress to the next stage.

Leading up to the game, Indonesia had lost all five matches to date in their qualification group, allowing 16 goals in the process. Internal conflict in the Football Association of Indonesia led them to prevent all Indonesia Super League players from playing. They only sent players who play in the Indonesian Premier League, although Indonesia's regular, better, and more experienced national players play in the Indonesia Super League. Indonesia was understood to have fielded inexperienced players due to this situation.

Prior to this match, Indonesia's record loss was 9–0, recorded in 1974 at the hands of Denmark.

In the six previous meetings between the two teams, each team had won twice, with two matches having been drawn. Both teams had met earlier in this round at the Gelora Bung Karno Stadium in Jakarta, with Bahrain winning 2–0. Prior to the qualification process, both teams last met at the same venue during the 2007 AFC Asian Cup group stage match on 10 July 2007. Hosts Indonesia won 2–1, avenging the 3–1 defeat at the same stage nearly three years earlier.

== Match summary ==
Indonesia started the game with an inexperienced side, with no player holding more than 12 international caps due to dualism only allowing those from the Indonesian Premier League to represent the national team. This was also the international debut for eight Indonesian starters (except Syamsidar, Irfan Bachdim, and Ferdinand Sinaga). They suffered an early setback when their goalkeeper Syamsidar was shown the red card in the first three minutes. After Bahrain scored the resultant penalty, they went on to be awarded a total of four penalties in the match, including three in the first half, although substitute Indonesia goalkeeper Andi Muhammad Guntur managed to save two of the four kicks.

== Match details ==
29 February 2012
16:30 AST

Bahrain	10–0	Indonesia
Abdullatif 5' (pen.), 71', 75'; Al Alawi 16', 61'; Abdulrahman 35' (pen.), 42'; Saeed 63', 82', 90+4'	Report

Bahrain National Stadium, Riffa
Attendance: 3,000
Referee: Andre El Haddad (Lebanon)

Bahrain	Indonesia

GK	1	Sayed Mohammed Jaffer
CB	3	Abdulla Al-Marzooqi
CB	5	Saleh Abdulhameed
CB	2	Waleed Al Hayam
DM	7	Abdulwahab Al-Safi
RM	15	Abdullah Omar
CM	4	Sayed Dhiya Saeed
CM	13	Mahmood Abdulrahman	(substituted off) 90+2'
LM	14	Salman Isa (c)
CF	11	Ismail Abdullatif
CF	10	Mohammed Tayeb Al Alawi
Substitutes:
MF	18	Fahad Hasan	(substituted on) 90+2'
Manager:
(England) Peter Taylor

GK	1	Syamsidar (c)	(red card) 3'
RB	14	Hengky Ardiles
CB	13	Gunawan Dwi Cahyo		(substituted off) 68'
CB	22	Abdul Rahman	(yellow card) 84'
LB	15	Diego Michiels	(yellow card) 30'
DM	8	Muhammad Taufiq
RM	10	Irfan Bachdim
CM	19	Slamet Nurcahyono		(substituted off) 4'
CM	6	Rendi Irwan
LM	11	Aditya Putra Dewa		(substituted off) 61'
CF	17	Ferdinand Sinaga
Substitutes:
GK	12	Andi Muhammad Guntur		(substituted on) 4'
DF	7	Ricky Ohorella		(substituted on) 61'
DF	23	Wahyu Wijiastanto		(substituted on) 68'
Manager:
Aji Santoso

Assistant referees:
Ziad Birak (Lebanon)
Hadi El Kassar (Lebanon)
Fourth official:
Radwan Ghandour (Lebanon)

== Post match ==
The final table was as follows:

Pos	Team	Pld	W	D	L	GF	GA	GD	Pts	Qualification
1	Iran	6	3	3	0	17	5	+12	12	Fourth round
2	Qatar	6	2	4	0	10	5	+5	10	Fourth round
3	Bahrain	6	2	3	1	13	7	+6	9	
4	Indonesia	6	0	0	6	3	26	−23	0	

Following the match, Indonesia finished the third round with the worst overall record of the 20 competing teams, having scored no points at all in the round while conceding a total of 26 goals.

Bahrain also failed to qualify for the following stage of qualifying, finishing with two wins, three draws and a single loss.
