= Fajar Handika =

Indonesian footballer

Personal information
- Full name: Fajar Handika
- Date of birth: 4 February 1990 (age 36)
- Place of birth: Deli Serdang, Indonesia
- Height: 1.75 m (5 ft 9 in)
- Position: Defensive midfielder

Senior career*
Years	Team	Apps	(Gls)
2008–2010	PSDS Deli Serdang	20	(1)
2010–2013	PSPS Pekanbaru	45	(0)
2013	Persela Lamongan	19	(1)
2014	Pro Duta	9	(2)
2014	Gresik United	7	(0)
2015	Mitra Kukar	1	(0)
2015–2016	Madura United	5	(0)
2017–2018	Barito Putera	43	(0)
2019	Kalteng Putra	25	(0)
2020	Badak Lampung	1	(1)
2021	RANS Cilegon	0	(0)
2021	PSM Makassar	9	(0)
2022–2023	Persipal Palu	9	(0)
2023–2024	Sada Sumut	5	(0)
- * Club domestic league appearances and goals as of 18 December 2023

Fajar Handika (born February 4, 1990) is an Indonesian professional footballer who last played as a defensive midfielder for Sada Sumut.

== Club career ==
=== Kalteng Putra ===
He was signed for Kalteng Putra to play in Liga 1 in the 2019 season. Handika made his league debut on 16 May 2019 in a match against PSIS Semarang at the Moch. Soebroto Stadium, Magelang.

=== Badak Lampung ===
He was signed for Badak Lampung to play in the Liga 2 in the 2020 season. This season was suspended on 27 March 2020 due to the COVID-19 pandemic. The season was abandoned and was declared void on 20 January 2021.

=== RANS Cilegon ===
In 2021, Fajar Handika signed a contract with Indonesian Liga 2 club RANS Cilegon.

=== PSM Makassar ===
He was signed for PSM Makasar to play in Liga 1 in the 2021 season. Handika made his debut on 18 September 2021 in a match against Persebaya Surabaya at the Si Jalak Harupat Stadium, Soreang.
