= Kacung Khoirul =

Indonesian footballer

Kacung Khoirul Munib
Personal information
- Full name: Kacung Khoirul Munib
- Date of birth: 27 September 1986 (age 40)
- Place of birth: Gresik, Indonesia
- Height: 1.70 m (5 ft 7 in)
- Position: Full-back

Senior career*
Years	Team	Apps	(Gls)
2006	Persegi Gianyar	7	(0)
2006	Mitra Kukar	12	(0)
2007	Gresik United	13	(0)
2008–2009	Mitra Kukar	18	(0)
2009–2015	Gresik United	103	(3)
2016	PSBI Blitar	19	(4)

International career
2006–2009	Indonesia U-23		
- * Club domestic league appearances and goals as of 11 July 2012

Kacung Khoirul or Kacung Munib (born September 27, 1986) is an Indonesian former footballer.
