= Adil Nur Bangsawan =

Indonesian footballer

Adil Nur
Personal information
- Full name: Adil Nur Bangsawan
- Date of birth: 10 May 2004 (age 22)
- Place of birth: Sungguminasa, Gowa, Indonesia
- Height: 1.70 m (5 ft 7 in)
- Position: Defensive midfielder

Team information
- Current team: Gresik United
- Number: 41

Youth career
- 2019–2020: Barito Putera
- 2021–2022: PSM Makassar

Senior career*
Years	Team	Apps	(Gls)
2022–2024	PSM Makassar	7	(0)
2025–	Gresik United	6	(0)
- * Club domestic league appearances and goals as of 8 January 2026 (UTC)

Adil Nur Bangsawan (born 10 May 2004) is an Indonesian professional footballer who plays as a defensive midfielder for Liga Nusantara club Gresik United.

== Club career ==
=== PSM Makassar ===
Adil is one of the young players promoted from the PSM youth team. On 30 January 2023, Adil made his professional league debut for PSM Makassar in a 3–1 win over RANS Nusantara at Gelora B.J. Habibie Stadium. He finished his first season in 2022–23 season with only 3 appearances. Despite this, he contributed to his team winning the league title.

Ahead of the 2023–24 season, Adil had an offer from the Central Java club, PSIS Semarang through agent who contacted him via Instagram direct message. Despite this, on 25 May 2023, Adil extended his contract with the club along with Sulthan Zaky, Muhammad Mufli Hidayat and Ricky Pratama. On 29 July 2023, he started his new season match in the 2023–24 season for PSM Makassar, playing as a substituted in a 0–0 draw over Bhayangkara.

== Career statistics ==
=== Club ===
As of 8 January 2026

Club	Season	League			Cup		Continental		Other		Total	
Club	Season	Division	Apps	Goals	Apps	Goals	Apps	Goals	Apps	Goals	Apps	Goals
PSM Makassar	2022–23	Liga 1	3	0	0	0	–		0	0	3	0
PSM Makassar	2023–24	Liga 1	4	0	0	0	–		0	0	4	0
PSM Makassar	2024–25	Liga 1	0	0	0	0	–		0	0	0	0
Gresik United	2025–26	Liga Nusantara	6	0	0	0	–		0	0	6	0
Career total			13	0	0	0	0	0	0	0	13	0

== Honours ==
PSM Makassar

- Liga 1: 2022–23
