= Amin Syarifudin =

Indonesian footballer

Personal information
- Full name: Amin Syarifudin
- Date of birth: 14 April 1982 (age 44)
- Place of birth: Tangerang, Banten, Indonesia
- Height: 1.80 m (5 ft 11 in)
- Position: Goalkeeper

Senior career*
Years	Team	Apps	(Gls)
2006	Persiter Ternate		
2007–2008	Persita Tangerang		
2009	Persekabpas Pasuruan		
2009–2010	Persikota Tangerang		
2010–2012	Mitra Kukar	1	(0)
2013–2014	PSPS Pekanbaru		
- * Club domestic league appearances and goals as of 11 July 2012

Amin Syarifudin (born April 14, 1982) is an Indonesian former footballer.
