= Ritham Madubun =

Indonesian footballer

Personal information
- Full name: Ritham Madubun
- Date of birth: 1 April 1971
- Place of birth: Kai Islands, Southeast Maluku, Indonesia
- Date of death: 1 August 2013 (aged 42)
- Place of death: Tual, North Maluku, Indonesia
- Position: Defender

Senior career*
Years	Team	Apps	(Gls)
1988–1997	Persipura Jayapura		
1997–1999	PSM Makassar		
1999–2001	Persikota Tangerang		
2002	Persija Jakarta		
2003	Pelita Jaya FC		
2004	Persija Jakarta		
2005	PSPS Pekanbaru		
2006	PSM Makassar		
2006	Persma Manado		
2007–2009	Persitara North Jakarta		

International career
1996–1997	Indonesia	8	(0)
- * Club domestic league appearances and goals

Ritham Madubun (1 April 1971 – 1 August 2013) is an Indonesian former footballer who plays as a defender. He played for Indonesia in the 1996 Asian Cup. He also played for Persipura Jayapura, PSM Makassar, Persikota Tangerang, Persija Jakarta, Pelita Jaya FC, PSPS Pekanbaru, Persma Manado.
