= Bruno Zandonaide =

Brazilian footballer (1981-2012)

Bruno Zandonadi
Personal information
- Full name: Bruno Jose Zandonadi
- Date of birth: 1 May 1981
- Place of birth: Brasília, Brazil
- Date of death: 13 October 2012 (aged 31)
- Place of death: Tangerang, Indonesia
- Height: 1.80 m (5 ft 11 in)
- Position: Midfielder

Senior career*
| Years | Team | Apps | (Gls) |
| 2006–2007 | Persikota Tangerang | | |
| 2008–2009 | Persiba Balikpapan | ?? | (1) |
| 2009 | Persita Tangerang | | |
| 2010 | PSIS Semarang | | |
| 2010–2011 | Persikota Tangerang | | |
- * Club domestic league appearances and goals

Bruno Jose Zandonadi (1 May 1981 – 13 October 2012) was a Brazilian footballer who played for Persikota Tangerang in the Liga Indonesia Premier Division. In the 2008-09 season, he played for Indonesia Super League club Persiba Balikpapan with one goal scored. He also played for another Tangerang football club Persita Tangerang and another premier division team PSIS Semarang.

Zandonadi died in Tangerang in October 2012 from the cytomegalovirus, eight weeks before the death of Diego Mendieta.
