= Eljo Iba =

Indonesian association footballer

Personal information
- Full name: Eljo Ernesto Ignatius Polikarpus Iba
- Date of birth: December 17, 1991 (age 34)
- Place of birth: Jayapura, Indonesia
- Height: 5 ft 7 in (1.70 m)
- Position: Right back

Youth career
- 2012: PON Papua

Senior career*
Years	Team	Apps	(Gls)
2014–2015	Gresik United	3	(0)
2016–2017	Bhayangkara	0	(0)
2018–2019	Persewar Waropen	9	(0)
2020–2021	Persiba Balikpapan	7	(0)
2022–2024	Persipura Jayapura	0	(0)
- * Club domestic league appearances and goals as of 1 December 2021

Eljo Ernesto Ignatius Polikarpus Iba (born December 17, 1991) is an Indonesian professional footballer who plays as a right back. His older brother, Erol Iba is a former footballer for Indonesia national team.

== Club career ==
=== Persiba Balikpapan ===
Eljo Iba joined the Persiba Balikpapan club in the 2020 Liga 2. This season was suspended on 27 March 2020 due to the COVID-19 pandemic. The season was abandoned and was declared void on 20 January 2021.
