= Handi Ramdhan =

Indonesian footballer

Personal information
- Full name: Handi Ramdhan
- Date of birth: 24 June 1983 (age 43)
- Place of birth: Bandung, Indonesia
- Height: 1.82 m (6 ft 0 in)
- Position: Defender

Senior career*
Years	Team	Apps	(Gls)
2003–2007	Persikab Bandung	58	(6)
2008–2009	Persiku Kudus	17	(4)
2009–2010	Persikab Bandung	23	(1)
2010–2012	Jakarta F.C. 1928	25	(4)
2013	Persiba Bantul	8	(2)
2014	Gresik United	3	(0)
2015–2018	Semen Padang	21	(0)
Total		155	(17)

International career
2012–2013	Indonesia	11	(0)
- * Club domestic league appearances and goals

Handi Ramdhan (born 24 June 1983) is an Indonesian former footballer who last played for Semen Padang. He is also a Second sergeant in the Indonesian Air Force.
