= Zainal Anwar =

Indonesian footballer

Personal information
- Full name: Zainal Anwar
- Date of birth: 26 January 1980 (age 46)
- Place of birth: Indonesia
- Height: 1.71 m (5 ft 7 1/2 in)
- Positions: Full-back; midfielder

Youth career
- 1999–2000: Pelita Solo
- 2000–2002: Pelita Krakatau Steel

Senior career*
Years	Team	Apps	(Gls)
2003–2004	Persita Tangerang	32	(5)
2004–2008	Persikota Tangerang	58	(1)
2009–2010	Persikabo Bogor	24	(0)
2010–2011	Persipasi Bekasi	25	(1)
2011–2012	PSMS Medan	21	(0)
2012–2013	Bhayangkara F.C.	20	(2)
2013–2014	Persipasi Bekasi	11	(0)
2014–2015	Villa 2000	25	(4)
- * Club domestic league appearances and goals

Zainal Anwar (born January 26, 1980) is an Indonesian former footballer plays as a full-back or midfielder.

== Club statistics ==
Club	Season	Super League		Premier Division		Piala Indonesia		Total	
Club	Season	Apps	Goals	Apps	Goals	Apps	Goals	Apps	Goals
PSMS Medan	2011-12	21	0	-		-		21	0
Total		21	0	-		-		21	0
