= Aries Tuansyah =

Indonesian footballer

Personal information
- Full name: Akhmad Aries Tuansyah
- Date of birth: 1 January 1984 (age 42)
- Place of birth: Gresik, Indonesia
- Height: 1.83 m (6 ft 0 in)
- Position: Centre back

Senior career*
Years	Team	Apps	(Gls)
2006–2012	Persibo Bojonegoro	86	(2)
2012–2013	Semen Padang	12	(0)
2014–2015	Gresik United	29	(0)
Total		127	(0)
- * Club domestic league appearances and goals

Akhmad Aries Tuansyah (born on 1 January 1984) is an Indonesian former footballer who plays as a defender. In 2013, He represented Semen Padang during the 2013 AFC Cup.

== Honours ==
=== Club honours ===
Persibo Bojonegoro

- Liga Indonesia First Division (1): 2007
- Piala Indonesia (1): 2012

Semen Padang

- Indonesian Community Shield (1): 2013
