= Persikota Tangerang =

Indonesian football club

- Full name: Persatuan Sepak Bola Indonesia Kota Tangerang
- Nicknames: Bayi Ajaib (The Miraculous Baby); Satria Bandara Soetta (Soetta Airport Warriors)
- Founded: 11 October 1994; 32 years ago
- Ground: Benteng Reborn Stadium; Tangerang, Indonesia
- Capacity: 20,000
- President: Raja Latuconsina
- Manager: Akmal Syuhairudin
- Coach: Firmansyah
- League: Liga Nusantara
- 2025–26: Liga Nusantara/Regular Round (Group B), 3rd
Home colours	Away colours	Third colours

Persatuan Sepak Bola Indonesia Kota Tangerang, or Persikota Tangerang, is an Indonesian professional football club based in Tangerang, founded in 1994. The team currently plays in the third division of Indonesian football, Liga Nusantara. Their home ground is Benteng Reborn Stadium.

== History ==
Persikota Tangerang was established on 11 October 1994 through the PSSI congress which was held at the end of December 1995, Persikota Tangerang was legalized as a member of PSSI and allowed to participate in the Liga Indonesia competition in the 1995–1996 season. After founding of the club, Persikota Tangerang won the Liga Indonesia Second Division in the 1995–1996 season after won 2–0 over Persipal Palu and won 1–0 against Persewangi Banyuwangi. Entering Liga Indonesia First Division in the 1996–97 season, in order to prepare an adequate team in Division I, Persikota which previously had recruited a number of national players from Pelita Jaya and Persija Jakarta, has recruited several national and foreign players, Francis Yonga from Cameroon and Ali Shaha from Tanzania.

As a result, Persikota won the group and qualified for the top 10 round. In the top 10, Persikota joined in group A and had to meet PSIM Yogyakarta, PSS Sleman, PSSB Bireuen, and Persiter Ternate which took place at the Mandala Krida Stadium, Yogyakarta. After recording pretty good results, 5-2 win against PSSB Bireuen, 3–0 against PSS Sleman, a 0–0 draw against PSIM Yogyakarta and a 4–3 defeat against Persiter Ternate, Persikota entered the next round. In the semifinals, Persikota faced the winner of group B, Perseden Denpasar. T managed to win through Nova Zaenal's goal in the 69th minute and went to the final round. Persikota had to again face PSIM who beat Persikabo Bogor 2–1 in the semifinals. Persikota was able to beat PSIM with a score of 3–1. And they qualified for the Liga Indonesia Premier Division in 1997–1998 season, earning the nickname Bayi Ajaib (In English: The Magical Baby). The highest achievement ever achieved by Persikota Tangerang was reaching the semifinals of the 1999-2000 Liga Indonesia Premier Division. This team is supported by a supporter groups called Benteng Mania.

Throughout the Liga Indonesia period in the 2000s, Persikota Tangerang was not relegated until 2013 due to the club's financial difficulties. Persikota competed in Liga 3 Banten zone from 2017. In June 2021, the club was bought by Indonesian presenter and actor Gading Marten. On 1 December 2021, 2021 Liga 3 Banten zone has been held and Persikota has become the champion to represent the province at the national level.

=== Era of Latuconsina family ===
On 30 January 2022, the club was bought by Indonesian actress, host, and singer Prilly Latuconsina.

Ahead of the 2025–26 season, the Latuconsina family has returned to Persikota's management after relinquishing ownership in mid-2022. This time, Raja Latuconsina was officially appointed as president director, along with several other names added to the management and coaching staff.

== Players ==
=== Current squad ===
As of November 2026

Note: Flags indicate national team as defined under FIFA eligibility rules; some limited exceptions apply. Players may hold more than one non-FIFA nationality.

No.	Pos.	Nation	Player
3	DF	IDN	Daffa Fahish
5	DF	IDN	Tezar Briantama
6	MF	IDN	Xavier Alexei
8	MF	IDN	Reksa Maulana
9	MF	IDN	Ramadani Kusuma
10	MF	IDN	Fernando Seboneno
11	FW	IDN	Samsudin
12	FW	IDN	Rifqi Zulianur
13	DF	IDN	Ikhsan Marzuki
14	FW	IDN	Riski Ramadhan
15	MF	IDN	Yuwanda Saragih
16	FW	IDN	Sandi Prasetya
17	MF	IDN	Henry Rivaldi
18	DF	IDN	Fiore Alifasyah

No.	Pos.	Nation	Player
19	FW	IDN	Rabbani Tasnim
21	MF	IDN	Adam Wardiansyah
22	MF	IDN	Muhammad Ridwan
23	MF	IDN	Femas Crespo
24	FW	IDN	David Laly
25	GK	IDN	Ahmad Rifai
26	GK	IDN	Bagus Radhytia
27	DF	IDN	Akmal Yudistira
32	DF	IDN	Taoriq Asis
37	FW	IDN	Rafa Irsyad
52	GK	IDN	Alvyn Permana
58	DF	IDN	Satria Dinata
62	FW	IDN	Beni Oktovianto
66	MF	IDN	Dimas Prasetyo
67	FW	IDN	Amir Hamzah
88	DF	IDN	Reyhan Syahputra

== Supporters ==
Persikota Tangerang has a large fanbase called Benteng Mania. Benteng Mania was founded in 1994 and its headquarters is at the Benteng Stadium, home to Persikota Tangerang. Benteng Mania now has 10,000 members in Tangerang.

Benteng Mania has its branches all around Indonesia. Among them are: Transit, Ciledug, V-room, Hard Kids, Sepatan, Benteng Makassar, Cipondoh, Benda, Kota, Kota Bumi, C-mone, Karawaci, Benua Indah complex (ROBIN), BInong, and Tanah Tinggi.

Benteng Mania also sang its own official songs during matches.

== Rivalries ==
Persikota has a rivalry with a team from the same region in Greater Tangerang, namely Persita Tangerang. Unlike the Old Indonesia derby between Persija Jakarta and Persib Bandung, the Tangerang derby can actually be said to be young. The beginning of the rivalry between the two Tangerang clubs was due to the expansion of the Tangerang area (which at that time was still a district). When it was still called Tangerang Regency, the only football club that existed was Persita Tangerang which had been established since 1953.

Matches between these two clubs often present a high level of rivalry, not only from the club side but also from its supporters, a number of riots between supporters often break out when these two teams compete. This led the Tangerang Indonesian Ulema Council (MUI) to issue a fatwa forbidden to hold a football match in this area in 2012. This is of course the implication of a number of victims who have fallen due to the riots of supporters throughout the history of the Tangerang derby.

== Season-by-season records ==
Season	League/Division	Tms.	Pos.	Piala Indonesia
1995–96	Second Division	400	1	–
1996–97	First Division	20	1	–
1997–98	Premier Division	33	did not finish	–
1998–99	Premier Division	28	4th, Second round	–
1999–2000	Premier Division	28	Semi-final	–
2001	Premier Division	28	5th, West division	–
2002	Premier Division	24	6th, West division	–
2003	Premier Division	20	6	–
2004	Premier Division	18	5	–
2005	Premier Division	28	11th, West Division	Second round
2006	Premier Division	28	7th, West Division	Round of 16
2007–08	Premier Division	36	15th, West Division	First round
2008–09	Premier Division	29	13th, Group 2	First round
2009–10	Premier Division	33	10th, Group 2	–
2010–11	Premier Division	39	12th, Group 2	–
2011–12	Premier Division (LPIS)	28	7th, Group 1	First round
2013				
2014	First Division	73	4th, Group E	–
2015	Liga Nusantara	season abandoned		–
2016	ISC Liga Nusantara	32	Quarter-final	–
2017	Liga 3	32	Eliminated in Provincial round	–
2018	Liga 3	32	Eliminated in Regional round	–
2019	Liga 3	32	3rd, First round	–
2020	Liga 3	season abandoned		–
2021–22	Liga 3	64	4th, Third round	–
2022–23	Liga 3	season abandoned		–
2023–24	Liga 3	80	2nd, Fourth round	–
2024–25	Liga 2	26	4th, Relegation round	–
2025–26	Liga Nusantara	24	3rd, Group B	–
2026–27	Liga Nusantara	24	TBD	–

== Honours ==
- Liga Indonesia Second Division
  - Champions: 1995–96
- Liga Indonesia First Division
  - Champions: 1996–97
- Liga 3 Banten
  - Champions: 2018,2019, 2021
  - Runners-up: 2022, 2023

== Notable former players ==
This is the list of several domestic and foreign former notable or famous players of Persikota Tangerang from time to time.

=== Indonesia ===
- (Indonesia) Jendri Pitoy
- (Indonesia) Jandia Eka Putra
- (Indonesia) Giman Nurjaman
- (Indonesia) I Komang Mariawan
- (Indonesia) Maulana Hasanuddin
- (Indonesia) Sudirman
- (Indonesia) Yeyen Tumena
- (Indonesia) Aliyudin Ali
- (Indonesia) Jalwandi
- (Indonesia) Andrian Mardiansyah
- (Indonesia) Firmansyah
- (Indonesia) Denny Agus
- (Indonesia) Zainal Anwar
- (Indonesia) Indra Kahfi Ardhiyasa
- (Indonesia) Ishak Djober
- (Indonesia) Muhammad Ilham
- (Indonesia) Yudi Khoerudin
- (Indonesia) Ritham Madubun
- (Indonesia) Yandi Munawar
- (Indonesia) Kahar Kalu Muzakkar
- (Indonesia) Mohammad Nasuha
- (Indonesia) Imran Nahumarury
- (Indonesia) Listianto Raharjo
- (Indonesia) Supriyono Salimin
- (Indonesia) Ruben Sanadi
- (Indonesia) Harry Saputra
- (Indonesia) Leo Saputra
- (Indonesia) Rendy Siregar
- (Indonesia) Amin Syarifudin
- (Indonesia) Ledi Utomo
- (Indonesia) Francis Wewengkang

=== Africa (CAF) ===
- (Tanzania) Ali Shaha
- (Cameroon) Francis Yonga
- (Cameroon) Moustapha Moctar Belbi
- (Cameroon) Christian Lenglolo
- (Cameroon) Epalla Jordan
- (Cameroon) Salomon Bengondo
- (Gabon) Saphou Lassy
- (Liberia) Samuel Chebli
- (Liberia) Joseph Amoah

=== South America (CONMEBOL) ===
- (Uruguay) Esteban Guillén
- (Brazil) Bruno Zandonaide
- (Brazil) Paulo Henrique

== Mascot ==
Kareo Bird is official fauna identity of Tangerang City.
