= Saphou Lassy =

Gabonese footballer

Personal information
- Full name: Saphou Lassy Axel
- Place of birth: Bitam, Gabon
- Position: Striker

Senior career*
Years	Team	Apps	(Gls)
- PSMS Medan
1998	Sabah FA		
199x–2000	PSM Makassar		
2000–2001	Persikota Tangerang		
2005	PSS Sleman		
- * Club domestic league appearances and goals

Saphou Lassy is a Gabonese former footballer who last played for PSS Sleman in Indonesia.

== Career ==
Flying his trade with Malaysian club Sabah FA in 1998, Lassy put in a number of high-level performances for the Rhinos during his time there, scoring a hat-trick to make it 4-1 in a Malaysia Cup group stage round opposing Pahang FA and repeating the feat as Sabah beat Brunei FA 6-0 to reach the semi-finals of the tournament. Overall, he tallied 12 goals in all competitions throughout his stay there.

Negotiating a move to PSS Sleman in early 2005, the Gabonese forward was denied a contract there, with the club saying that he was not good enough.

Lassy was replaced by Brazilian Cristiano de Oliveira for PSM Makassar as the management saw him as indolent and insouciant.
