= Ikhsan Marzuki =

Indonesian footballer

Personal information
- Full name: Ikhsan Hidayah Marzuki
- Date of birth: 31 May 2000 (age 26)
- Place of birth: Bekasi, Indonesia
- Position: Defender

Team information
- Current team: Persikota Tangerang
- Number: 13

Youth career
- 2015–2016: Legenda Football Academy
- 2017: Patriot Candrabaga
- 2018–2019: Bhayangkara

Senior career*
Years	Team	Apps	(Gls)
2021–2022	Persikabo 1973	3	(0)
2022–2023	KS Inter Banten	0	(0)
2024–2025	Persitara North Jakarta	6	(0)
2025–2026	Batavia	12	(1)
2026–	Persikota Tangerang	1	(0)
- * Club domestic league appearances and goals as of 13 November 2026

Ikhsan Hidayah Marzuki (born 31 May 2000) is an Indonesian professional footballer who plays as a defender for Liga Nusantara club Persikota Tangerang.

== Club career ==
=== Persikabo 1973 ===
He was signed for Persikabo 1973 to play in Liga 1 in the 2021 season. Marzuki made his professional debut on 9 December 2021 in a match against Persiraja Banda Aceh at the Sultan Agung Stadium, Bantul.

== International career ==
In November 2019, Ikhsan was named as Indonesia U-20 All Stars squad, to play in U-20 International Cup held in Bali.

== Career statistics ==
=== Club ===
As of 7 February 2022.

Club	Season	League			Cup		Continental		Other		Total	
Club	Season	Division	Apps	Goals	Apps	Goals	Apps	Goals	Apps	Goals	Apps	Goals
Persikabo 1973	2021	Liga 1	3	0	0	0	–		0	0	3	0
Career total			3	0	0	0	0	0	0	0	3	0
