= Jejen Zaenal Abidin =

Indonesian footballer

Jejen
Personal information
- Full name: Jejen Zaenal Abidin
- Date of birth: 17 December 1987 (age 38)
- Place of birth: Bandung, Indonesia
- Height: 1.68 m (5 ft 6 in)
- Position: Wide midfielder

Youth career
- 1997–2005: Persib Bandung

Senior career*
Years	Team	Apps	(Gls)
2009–2010	Persikabo Bogor	16	(2)
2010–2011	Persib Bandung	6	(1)
2013	Pelita Bandung Raya	7	(0)
2014	Persiba Bantul	13	(1)
2014–2015	Gresik United	0	(0)
2019	Persatu Tuban	4	(1)
2021–2022	Hizbul Wathan	5	(0)
- * Club domestic league appearances and goals as of 00:38, 30 November 2021 (UTC)

Jejen Zaenal Abidin (born 17 December 1987) is an Indonesian professional footballer who plays as a wide midfielder.

== Club career ==
=== Gresik United ===
In December 2014, Abidin signed with Gresik United.

=== Hizbul Wathan ===
In 2021, Jejen signed a contract with Indonesian Liga 2 club Hizbul Wathan. He made his league debut on 27 September against Persijap Jepara at the Manahan Stadium, Surakarta.
