= Aris Alfiansyah =

Indonesian footballer (born 1989)

Aris
Personal information
- Full name: Aris Alfiansyah
- Date of birth: 10 April 1989 (age 37)
- Place of birth: Surabaya, East Java, Indonesia
- Height: 1.80 m (5 ft 11 in)
- Position: Striker

Youth career
- 2008–2010: Persela U-21

Senior career*
Years	Team	Apps	(Gls)
2007–2008	KSB West Sumbawa	21	(9)
2008–2012	Persela Lamongan	74	(4)
2013–2014	Persiba Balikpapan	3	(0)
2014	Gresik United	4	(0)
Total		102	(13)

International career
2011	Indonesia U 23	?	(1)
- * Club domestic league appearances and goals

Aris Alfiansyah (born 10 April 1989) is an Indonesian former footballer who plays as a striker. From the 2008 to 2010 he also plays for Persela U-21 and he scored 12 goals for the team.

== Club statistics ==
Club	Season	Super League		Premier Division		Piala Indonesia		Total	
Club	Season	Apps	Goals	Apps	Goals	Apps	Goals	Apps	Goals
Persela Lamongan	2010-11	20	1	-		-		20	1
Persela Lamongan	2011-12	17	1	-		-		17	1
Total		37	2	-		-		37	2
