= Samuel Chebli =

Liberian association football coach

Sam Chebli
Personal information
- Full name: Samuel Chebli
- Date of birth: 28 February 1971 (age 55)
- Place of birth: Liberia
- Height: 1.85 m (6 ft 1 in)
- Position: Midfielder

Senior career*
Years	Team	Apps	(Gls)
19xx–1997	Perak FA		
1998	Terengganu FA		
2001	Putra Samarinda		
2002	Petrokimia Putra		
2003	Long An F.C.		
2004	Pelita Krakatau Steel		
2005	Persikota Tangerang		

International career
1999–2000	Liberia	2	(0)

Managerial career
- FC Fassell (assistant)
- 2015–2017: FC Fassell
- 2017–: Nimba United FC
- * Club domestic league appearances and goals

Samuel Chebli (born 28 February 1971 in Liberia) is a Liberian football coach and former footballer.

== Malaysia ==
Participating in the Malaysia Cup with Terengganu FA in 1998, Chebli found the net twice to help the Turtles reach the semi-final of the competition. However, due to the Football Association of Malaysia's ban on foreigners, he was considered superfluous by the club and returned to Liberia by the end December that year.

== International ==
He has represented the Liberia internationally from 1999 to 2000, making 2 appearances including one against Sudan for a 2002 World Cup qualifier. He is also deputy coach of the Liberia national team as of 2018.
