= Ishak Djober =

Indonesian footballer

Personal information
- Full name: Ishak Yohanes M. Djober
- Date of birth: 3 August 1989 (age 37)
- Place of birth: Papua, Indonesia
- Height: 1.65 m (5 ft 5 in)
- Position: Midfielder

Senior career*
Years	Team	Apps	(Gls)
2008–2011	Persikota Tangerang	30	(1)
2011–2014	Persepam Madura United	55	(6)
2014–2015	Mitra Kukar	5	(0)
2016	PSS Sleman	19	(0)
2017–2019	Persibat Batang	37	(5)
- * Club domestic league appearances and goals

Ishak Djober (born on August 3, 1989) is an Indonesian footballer.
