= Yoseph Malau =

Indonesian footballer

Nico Malau
Personal information
- Full name: Yoseph Ostanika Malau
- Date of birth: 19 March 1991 (age 35)
- Place of birth: Binjai, Indonesia
- Height: 1.70 m (5 ft 7 in)
- Position: Forward

Team information
- Current team: PSMS Medan
- Number: 17

Senior career*
Years	Team	Apps	(Gls)
2007–2009	PSKB Binjai	21	(7)
2009–2010	Medan United	12	(2)
2010–2011	Bintang Medan	16	(4)
2011–2012	PSMS Medan (ISL)	22	(5)
2012–2013	Semen Padang	11	(0)
2014–2015	Persiba Balikpapan	2	(0)
2016	PSMS Medan	5	(0)
2017	757 Kepri Jaya	3	(0)
2017	PS Bengkulu	7	(2)
2018	Persiwa Wamena	2	(1)
2019–2021	Tiga Naga	18	(7)
2022–	PSMS Medan	17	(4)

International career^{‡}
2012	Indonesia U23	2	(0)
- * Club domestic league appearances and goals as of 6 February 2024 ‡ National team caps and goals as of 9 September 2012

Yoseph Ostanika Malau or Nico Malau (born 19 March 1991) is an Indonesian professional footballer who plays as a forward for Liga 2 club PSMS Medan.

== Honours ==
=== Club ===
Semen Padang

- Indonesian Community Shield: 2013
