= Andi Setiawan =

Indonesian footballer

Personal information
- Full name: Andi Setiawan
- Date of birth: 6 September 1984 (age 42)
- Place of birth: Indonesia
- Height: 1.80 m (5 ft 11 in)
- Position: Goalkeeper

Senior career*
Years	Team	Apps	(Gls)
2014–2015	Persiba Bantul	7	(0)
2016	Persela Lamongan	7	(0)
2017–2018	Sragen United	5	(0)
- * Club domestic league appearances and goals as of 22:48, 12 September 2014 (UTC)

Andi Setiawan (born 6 September 1984) is an Indonesian former footballer who plays as a goalkeeper.
