= Danang Jarwo Wihatmoko =

Indonesian footballer

Danang Wihatmoko
Personal information
- Full name: Danang Jarwo Wihatmoko
- Date of birth: 7 May 1982 (age 44)
- Place of birth: Jepara, Indonesia
- Height: 1.81 m (5 ft 11 1/2 in)
- Position: Goalkeeper

Senior career*
Years	Team	Apps	(Gls)
2004–2010	Persijap Jepara	110	(0)
2010–2011	Deltras Sidoarjo	25	(0)
2011–2012	Persijap Jepara	77	(0)
2012–2013	Persibo Bojonegoro	22	(0)
2013–2014	Deltras Sidoarjo	27	(0)
2014–2015	Persijap Jepara	26	(0)
- * Club domestic league appearances and goals as of 18:50, 6 Maret 2013 (UTC)

Danang Jarwo Wihatmoko (born 7 May 1982) is an Indonesian former footballer who plays as a goalkeeper.

== Record ==
Danang Wihatmoko never had the goal record that he never conceded keeping the ball in Indonesia Super League 2009/2010. He was called up in Indonesia national team selection, but because of Danang Wihatmoko was injured so he did not qualify for the national team players.
