= Andi Muhammad Guntur =

Indonesian footballer

Personal information
- Full name: Andi Muhammad Guntur
- Date of birth: 31 October 1990 (age 35)
- Place of birth: Makassar, Indonesia
- Height: 1.82 m (6 ft 0 in)
- Position: Goalkeeper

Youth career
- 2008–2009: PSM Makassar U21

Senior career*
Years	Team	Apps	(Gls)
2010–2014	PSM Makassar	18	(0)

International career
2012	Indonesia	1	(0)
- * Club domestic league appearances and goals

Andi Muhammad Guntur (born 31 October 1990) is an Indonesian former footballer who plays as a goalkeeper.

On 29 February, he made his debut for the Indonesia national team against Bahrain. He was brought on two minutes into the game after Samsidar had received a red card and conceded 10 goals in a comprehensive 10–0 defeat, the largest in the team's history.

== See also ==
- Bahrain 10-0 Indonesia
