= Dimas Sumantri =

Indonesian footballer (born 1995)

Personal information
- Full name: Dimas Sumantri
- Date of birth: 17 November 1995 (age 30)
- Place of birth: Serdang Bedagai, Indonesia
- Height: 1.72 m (5 ft 8 in)
- Position: Full-back

Senior career*
Years	Team	Apps	(Gls)
2014–2015	PSDS Deli Serdang	10	(0)
2016–2017	Semen Padang	5	(0)
2017–2019	PSMS Medan	9	(1)
2019	Semen Padang	0	(0)
2020	PSKC Cimahi	0	(0)

International career
2013	Indonesia U19	7	(2)
Medal record
Men's football
Representing Indonesia
AFF U-19 Youth Championship
Winner	2013 Sidoarjo & Gresik
- * Club domestic league appearances and goals as of 7 May 2019

Dimas Sumantri (born 17 November 1995) is an Indonesian professional footballer who plays as a full-back.

== Honours ==
=== Club ===
PSMS Medan

- Liga 2 runner-up: 2017

=== International ===
Indonesia U-19

- AFF U-19 Youth Championship: 2013
