= Juan Acuña (born 1987) =

Paraguayan footballer

Personal information
- Full name: Juan Emmanuel Acuña Muñoz
- Date of birth: March 31, 1987 (age 39)
- Place of birth: Paraguay
- Height: 1.83 m (6 ft 0 in)
- Position: Striker

Senior career*
Years	Team	Apps	(Gls)
- River Plate
2014–2015	Barito Putera	2	(0)
- * Club domestic league appearances and goals as of 9 March 2014

Juan Emmanuel Acuña Muñoz or Juan Acuña (born March 31, 1987) is a Paraguayan footballer who currently plays as a striker for Barito Putera in Indonesia Super League.

== Club ==
=== Barito Putera ===
On 27 February 2014 Juan Acuña has officially joined the Barito Putera for the duration of one season.
