= 2013 Indonesian Community Shield =

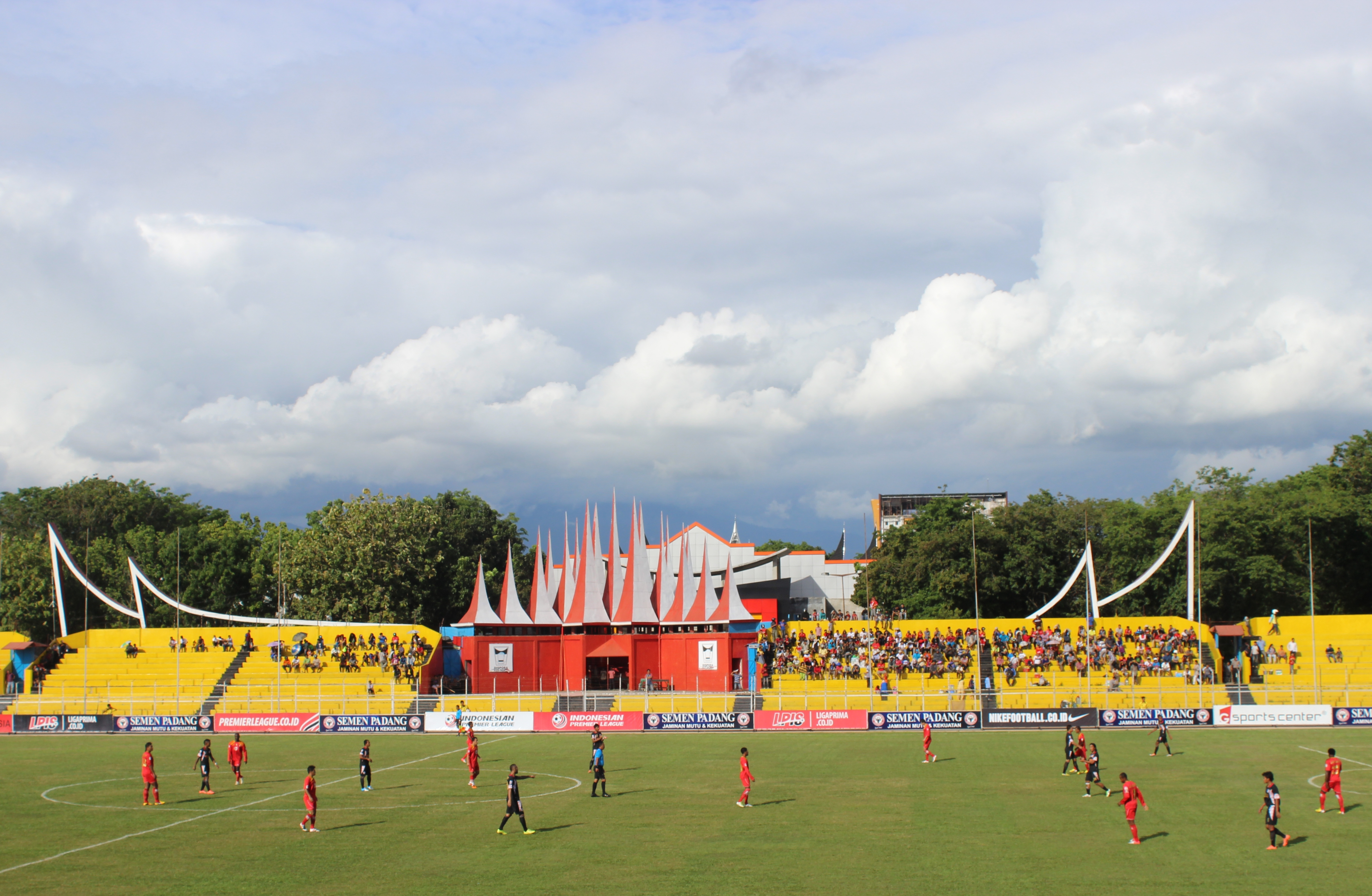
- The match was played at Haji Agus Salim Stadium.
Semen Padang FC	Persibo Bojonegoro
4	1
- Date: 10 February 2013
- Venue: Haji Agus Salim Stadium, Padang
- Attendance: 8,000

The 2013 Indonesian Community Shield was the third Indonesian Community Shield. The match was contested by the 2011–12 Indonesian Premier League winners Semen Padang FC and 2012 Piala Indonesia winners Persibo Bojonegoro. It took place on 10 February 2013 at the Haji Agus Salim Stadium in Padang, Indonesia. Semen Padang won the match 4–1.

== Match details ==
10 February 2013
16:00 WIB

Semen Padang FC	4–1	Persibo Bojonegoro
Wilson 21', 52'; Vizcarra 62'; Iskandar 68'	Report	Chalwa 90'

Haji Agus Salim Stadium, Padang
Attendance: 8,000

Semen Padang FC	Persibo Bojonegoro

Semen Padang FC:
GK	21	(Indonesia) Jandia Eka Putra
RB	11	(Indonesia) Hengky Ardiles
CB	13	(Indonesia) Wahyu Wijiastanto
CB	30	(Indonesia) Aries Tuansyah
LB	27	(Indonesia) Ricky Ohorella
RM	8	(Indonesia) Elie Aiboy	(substituted off) 65'
CM	10	(Indonesia) Vendry Mofu	(substituted off) 72'
CM	45	(South Korea) Yoo Hyun-goo
LM	23	(Argentina) Esteban Vizcarra
CF	25	(Indonesia) Titus Bonai
CF	22	(Liberia) Edward Wilson
Substitutes:
MF	17	(Indonesia) Nur Iskandar	(substituted on) 65'
MF	9	(Indonesia) Muhammad Rizal	(substituted on) 72'
Manager:
(Indonesia) Jafri Sastra

Persibo Bojonegoro:
GK		(Indonesia) Komang Arya Perdana
RB	29	(Indonesia) Sigit Meiko Susanto
CB		(Indonesia) Nugroho Mardianto
CB		(Indonesia) Arfan Baba
LB		(Indonesia) Eddy Gunawan	(substituted off) 67'
MF		(Indonesia) Tri Rahmat
MF	10	(South Korea) Han Ji-ho
MF		(Indonesia) Rendy Syahputra	(substituted off) 45'
MF		(Liberia) Alexander Robinson
CF		(Indonesia) Wahyu Teguh	(substituted off) 86'
CF		(Liberia) Josiah Seton
Substitutes:
GK		(Indonesia) Dede Sulaiman
		(Indonesia) Oktavianus Fernando
		(Indonesia) Tamsil Sijaya
		(Iran) Mahmoud Mansouri
DF		(Indonesia) Crah Angger	(substituted on) 67'
MF		(Indonesia) Sutaji	(substituted on) 45'
FW	7	(Indonesia) Bijahil Chalwa	(substituted on) 86'
Manager:
(Indonesia) Gusnul Yakin
