= Hari Novian Caniago =

Indonesian footballer

Hari Novian
Personal information
- Full name: Hari Novian Caniago
- Date of birth: 6 November 1986 (age 40)
- Place of birth: Indonesia
- Height: 1.70 m (5 ft 7 in)
- Position: Defender

Senior career*
Years	Team	Apps	(Gls)
2007	PS Pasbar		
2008–2009	PSP Padang	1	(0)
2010–2011	PSCS Cilacap	2	(0)
2011	Persik Kediri	5	(0)
2011–2013	Persiwa Wamena	20	(0)
2014	Persih Tembilahan	2	(0)
2014–2015	Persita Tangerang	29	(0)
2015	Persiba Bantul	0	(0)
- * Club domestic league appearances and goals

Hari Novian Caniago (born on November 6, 1986) is an Indonesian former footballer.

== Club career statistics ==
As of 11 July 2012.

Club performance			League		Cup		League Cup		Total	
Season	Club	League	Apps	Goals	Apps	Goals	Apps	Goals	Apps	Goals
Indonesia			League		Piala Indonesia		League Cup		Total	
2008–09	PSP Padang	Premier Division	1	0	0	0	-		1	0
2010–11	PSCS Cilacap	Premier Division	2	0	-		-		2	0
2010–11	Persik Kediri	Premier Division	5	0	-		-		5	0
2011–12	Persiwa Wamena	Super League	20	0	-		-		20	0
Total	Indonesia		28	0	0	0	-		28	0
Career total			28	0	0	0	-		28	0
