= Catur Rintang =

Indonesian footballer

Personal information
- Full name: Catur Rintang Heni Setiawan
- Date of birth: 16 May 1988 (age 38)
- Place of birth: Jepara, Indonesia
- Height: 1.74 m (5 ft 8 1/2 in)
- Position: Midfielder

Senior career*
Years	Team	Apps	(Gls)
2008–2014	Persijap Jepara	66	(4)
- * Club domestic league appearances and goals as of 00:45, 3 September 2014 (UTC)

Catur Rintang Heni Setiawan (born 16 May 1988) is an Indonesian former footballer who plays as a midfielder.

== Career ==
=== Persijap Jepara ===
He played since 2009 for Persijap Jepara.
