= Firmansyah (footballer, born 1984) =

Indonesian footballer

Personal information
- Date of birth: 18 November 1984 (age 41)
- Place of birth: Tangerang, Indonesia
- Height: 1.82 m (5 ft 11 1/2 in)
- Position: Goalkeeper

Senior career*
| Years | Team | Apps | (Gls) |
| 2008–2009 | Persija Jakarta | | |
| 2009–2010 | PSSB Bireuen | | |
| 2010–2011 | Persela Lamongan | 1 | (0) |
| 2011–2014 | Persepam Madura United | 16 | (0) |
| 2016 | Persita Tangerang | 11 | (0) |
- * Club domestic league appearances and goals

Firmansyah (born November 18, 1984) is an Indonesian former footballer.
