= Isaac Pupo =

Liberian footballer (born 1985)

Personal information
- Full name: Isaac Pupo
- Date of birth: October 15, 1985 (age 41)
- Place of birth: Monrovia, Liberia
- Height: 1.87 m (6 ft 2 in)
- Position: Midfielder

Team information
- Current team: Watanga FC

Senior career*
Years	Team	Apps	(Gls)
?–2002	Caldwell Super Stars	21	(9)
2003	Monrovia Club Breweries	26	(6)
2004–2007	LPRC Oilers	24	(7)
2007–2008	FK Karabakh	19	(3)
2008–2009	Muğan Salyan	24	(1)
2010–2011	Panionios	7	(0)
2011	Hammarby IF	8	(0)
2012–2014	LPRC Oilers	23	(9)
2014	Persebaya ISL (Bhayangkara)	12	(5)
2015	Kelantan FA	26	(0)
2016–2017	Monrovia Club Breweries		
2019–	Watanga FC		

International career^{‡}
2005–2019	Liberia	15	(0)
- * Club domestic league appearances and goals as of March 22, 2016 ‡ National team caps and goals as of 6 November 2019

Isaac Pupo (born October 23, 1985) is a Liberian footballer who plays as a midfielder for Watanga FC. He also played for Liberia national football team.

In August 2007 Pupo signed for FK Qarabağ in the Azerbaijan Premier League on a one-year contract. Whilst with Qarabağ, Pupo won the player of the month and attracted interest from several Turkish sides, namely Denizlispor, Trabzonspor and Gençlerbirliği OFTAŞ. After one season with Qarabağ, and the club apparently unwilling to match Pupo's wage demands, Pupo signed for newly promoted Azerbaijan Premier League side NBC Salyan.

After his stint in Azerbaijan, Pupo signed for Greek top-flight team Panionios on a five-year contract. But he left the club after only one full season. Panionios' financial problems was told to be the main reason for his exit.

In the summer of 2011, on the 28th of July, he signed for the Swedish club Hammarby IF. A team based in the capital Stockholm, playing in the second tier, Superettan. He signed a short-term contract with the club, with an option of an additional three years.

He lastly played for Kelantan FA
