= Syamsidar =

Indonesian footballer

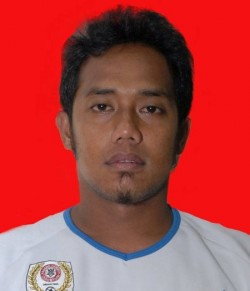
- Syamsidar in 2012

Personal information
- Full name: Syamsidar
- Date of birth: 15 July 1982 (age 44)
- Place of birth: North Luwu, Indonesia
- Height: 1.78 m (5 ft 10 in)
- Position: Goalkeeper

Youth career
- Gaspa Palopo

Senior career*
Years	Team	Apps	(Gls)
2001–2002	Persim Maros	10	(0)
2003	Persebaya Surabaya	0	(0)
2004	Persija Jakarta		(0)
2005–2010	PSM Makassar	64	(0)
2010–2012	Semen Padang	31	(0)
2013	Mitra Kukar	19	(0)
2015	PSS Sleman	5	(0)
2017	PS Badung		(0)
Total		131+	(0)

International career
2002	Indonesia U21	6	(0)
2003–2005	Indonesia U23		
2006–2012	Indonesia	4	(0)
- * Club domestic league appearances and goals

Syamsidar (born 15 July 1982) was an Indonesian former footballer who played as a goalkeeper.

== International career ==
On 29 February 2012, he captained Indonesia against Bahrain in the 2014 World Cup qualification third round. After four minutes, he was sent off. Subsequently, Andi Muhammad Guntur went in goal and the result was a 10–0 loss, Indonesia's biggest-ever defeat.

== Career statistics ==
=== International ===
Appearances and goals by national team and year
National team	Year	Apps	Goals
Indonesia	2006	2	0
Indonesia	2012	2	0
Total		4	0

== Honours ==
=== Club ===
Persebaya Surabaya

- Liga Indonesia First Division : 2003

Semen Padang

- Indonesia Premier League: 2011-12
- Piala Indonesia runner-up: 2012

=== International ===
Indonesia U-21

- Hassanal Bolkiah Trophy: 2002

=== Individual honours ===
- Hassanal Bolkiah Trophy Best Player: 2002
