= Isak Konon =

Indonesian footballer

Personal information
- Full name: Isak Konon Wombon
- Date of birth: February 15, 1986 (age 40)
- Place of birth: Merauke, Papua, Indonesia
- Height: 1.69 m (5 ft 6 1/2 in)
- Positions: Full back; wingback

Senior career*
Years	Team	Apps	(Gls)
2006–2007	Persiter Ternate	12	(1)
2007–2013	Persiwa Wamena	98	(2)
2013	Persidafon Dafonsoro	10	(0)
2014–2015	Persiram Raja Ampat	8	(0)
- * Club domestic league appearances and goals as of 19 June 2012

Isak Konon Wombon or Isak Konon (born 15 February 1986 in Merauke, Papua) is an Indonesian former footballer who plays as a defender or can operate as a winger as well.
