= Joice Sorongan =

Indonesian footballer

Personal information
- Full name: Joice Sorongan
- Date of birth: 18 October 1975 (age 51)
- Place of birth: Parigi Moutong, Indonesia
- Height: 1.77 m (5 ft 9 1/2 in)
- Position: Goalkeeper

Team information
- Current team: PSBS Biak (goalkeeping coach)

Senior career*
Years	Team	Apps	(Gls)
2006	Persita Tangerang	12	(0)
2007	Persma Manado	6	(0)
2008	Persidafon Dafonsoro	19	(0)
2009	Persikab Bandung	11	(0)
2009–2010	Persiram Raja Ampat	23	(0)
2010–2017	Mitra Kukar	57	(0)
Total		128	(0)

Managerial career
- 2018–2019: Mitra Kukar (goalkeeping coach)
- 2020: Badak Lampung (goalkeeping coach)
- 2021–2022: Mitra Kukar (goalkeeping coach)
- 2022–2024: Persipura Jayapura (goalkeeping coach)
- 2024–: PSBS Biak (goalkeeping coach)
- * Club domestic league appearances and goals

Joice Sorongan (born October 18, 1975) is a former Indonesian professional footballer.

== Club statistics ==
Club	Season	Super League		Premier Division		Piala Indonesia		Total	
Club	Season	Apps	Goals	Apps	Goals	Apps	Goals	Apps	Goals
Mitra Kukar	2010-11	20	0	-		-		20	0
Mitra Kukar	2011-12	23	0	-		-		23	0
Total		43	0	-		-		43	0
