= Carlos González (footballer, born 1986) =

Paraguayan footballer

Carlos Javier "Carlitos" González Ozuna (born February 8, 1986) is a Paraguayan footballer who currently plays as a striker for Club Sportivo San Lorenzo in Paraguay. He currently plays as a striker for Persiba Balikpapan in Indonesia Super League.
