= Errol Simunapendi =

Indonesian footballer

Personal information
- Full name: Errol Ethicus Simunapendi
- Date of birth: 10 September 1987 (age 39)
- Place of birth: Indonesia
- Height: 1.70 m (5 ft 7 in)
- Position: Defender

Senior career*
Years	Team	Apps	(Gls)
2009–2015	Persiram Raja Ampat	128	(8)
- * Club domestic league appearances and goals as of 00:50, 3 September 2014 (UTC)

Errol Simunapendi (born 10 September 1987) is an Indonesian former footballer who plays as a defender.
