= Slamet Nurcahyono =

Indonesian footballer

Personal information
- Full name: Slamet Irfan Nurcahyono
- Date of birth: 11 July 1983 (age 43)
- Place of birth: Jember, Indonesia
- Height: 1.65 m (5 ft 5 in)
- Position: Attacking midfielder

Senior career*
Years	Team	Apps	(Gls)
2004–2006	Persebaya Surabaya	18	(5)
2006–2009	PSS Sleman	43	(20)
2009–2010	Persiba Bantul	40	(11)
2010–2011	Persibo Bojonegoro	7	(0)
2011–2013	Persiba Bantul	34	(8)
2013–2014	Persepam Madura United	20	(2)
2014–2015	Persebaya (DU)	2	(1)
2016–2024	Madura United	179	(24)
2024–2025	Persibo Bojonegoro	3	(0)
2025–2026	RANS Nusantara	8	(0)

International career
2012–2017	Indonesia	6	(0)
- * Club domestic league appearances and goals as of 26 January 2026

Slamet Irfan Nurcahyono (born 11 July 1983) is an Indonesian professional footballer who plays as an attacking midfielder.

== International career ==
He made his debut for Indonesia in 2014 FIFA World Cup qualification against Bahrain on 29 February 2012, but was substituted out for Andi Muhammad Guntur after only four minutes after the starter goalkeeper was sent off.

== Career statistics ==
=== International ===
As of match played 2 September 2017

Appearances and goals by national team and year
National team	Year	Apps	Goals
Indonesia	2012	2	0
Indonesia	2013	2	0
Indonesia	2014	1	0
Indonesia	2017	1	0
Total		6	0

== Honours ==
Persebaya Surabaya

- Liga Indonesia Premier Division: 2004

Persiba Bantul

- Liga Indonesia Premier Division: 2010–11

RANS Nusantara

- Liga Nusantara: 2025–26
