= Leo Saputra =

Indonesian footballer

Personal information
- Full name: Leo Saputra Jacob
- Date of birth: 20 December 1980 (age 45)
- Place of birth: Pangkal Pinang, Indonesia
- Height: 1.75 m (5 ft 9 in)
- Positions: Defender; midfielder

Youth career
- 1992−1995: Diklat Palembang
- 1995−1998: Diklat Ragunan

Senior career*
Years	Team	Apps	(Gls)
1999−2001	Pelita Solo		
2002−2003	Persijatim Solo FC	18	(2)
2004	Pelita Krakatau Steel		(0)
2005	Sriwijaya		(0)
2006	Persikota Tangerang		(0)
2007−2008	Persibom Bolaang Mongondow	25	(0)
2008−2013	Persija Jakarta	87	(0)
2013	Persita Tangerang	12	(0)
2014	Persebaya ISL (Bhayangkara)	4	(0)
2014–2016	Persita Tangerang	31	(0)

International career
1996	Indonesia U-18		
2003	Indonesia U-23		
- * Club domestic league appearances and goals as of 11 July 2012

Leo Saputra (born 20 December 1980) is an Indonesian footballer who plays as a defender.

== Honours ==
=== Country honors ===
Indonesia U-18

- Asian Schools Championship (1): 1996
