= Julio Larrea =

Paraguayan footballer (born 1987)

Personal information
- Full name: Julio Cesar Larrea Flores
- Date of birth: March 2, 1987 (age 39)
- Place of birth: Paraguay
- Height: 1.73 m (5 ft 8 in)
- Positions: Midfielder; striker

Senior career*
Years	Team	Apps	(Gls)
2005–2007	Palmeiras	11	(9)
2007–2014	Ponte Preta	29	(28)
2014	Persebaya ISL/Bhayangkara FC	4	(0)
- * Club domestic league appearances and goals as of 20 April 2014

Julio Cesar Larrea Flores or Julio Larrea (born March 2, 1987) is a Paraguayan former footballer.

== Club ==
=== Persebaya ISL ===
On 6 March 2014 Julio Larrea has officially joined the Persebaya ISL for the duration of one season with the Rp 700 million contract.
