= Emmanuel Kenmogne =

Cameroonian footballer

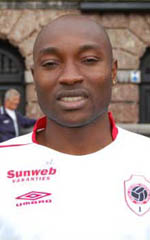

Personal information
- Full name: Emmanuel Pacho Kenmogne
- Date of birth: 2 September 1980 (age 46)
- Place of birth: Bafoussam, Cameroon
- Height: 1.85 m (6 ft 1 in)
- Position: Forward

Senior career*
Years	Team	Apps	(Gls)
1998–2000	Sable FC		
2000–2001	Africa Sports National		
2001–2003	La Louvière	37	(10)
2003–2004	R.A.E.C. Mons	19	(3)
2004–2005	A.F.C. Tubize		
2005–2007	Union Royale Namur		
2007–2010	Royal Antwerp		
2010–2012	Olympiakos Nicosia	56	(18)
2012–2013	Ethnikos Achna	24	(6)
2013–2014	Persija Jakarta	16	(14)
2014–2015	Bhayangkara F.C.	25	(25)
2015–2016	Kelantan FA		
2016	Persija Jakarta		
- * Club domestic league appearances and goals

Emmanuel Kenmogne (born 2 September 1980) is a Cameroonian professional footballer who played as a forward.

== Career ==
Kenmogne began his career with local club, Sable FC, for whom he played in the CAF Champions League 2000. He next joined Africa Sports National of Côte d'Ivoire. Kenmogne moved to Belgium in 2002, where he played for La Louvière and R.A.E.C. Mons in the Belgian First Division, before joining Royal Antwerp.

Kenmogne joined Indonesian side Persija Jakarta in July 2013.

== Honours ==
Sable FC

- Cameroon Première Division: 1999
- Super Coupe Roger Milla: 1999

La Louvière

- Belgian Cup: 2002–03

Individual

- Indonesia Super League top goalscorer: 2014
