= Abdul Lestaluhu =

Indonesian footballer

Personal information
- Full name: Abdul Rahman Lestaluhu
- Date of birth: 23 August 1993 (age 33)
- Place of birth: Maluku, Indonesia
- Height: 1.64 m (5 ft 5 in)
- Position: Winger

Youth career
- 2009–2010: Deportivo Indonesia
- 2012: → Peñarol (loan)

Senior career*
Years	Team	Apps	(Gls)
2012–2013	Visé	1	(0)
2014	Persebaya (Bhayangkara)	6	(1)
2015	Persija Jakarta	0	(0)
2017	757 Kepri Jaya	13	(3)
2018	Semen Padang	18	(2)
2019–2020	Badak Lampung	7	(2)
Total		45	(8)

International career
2009–2011	Indonesia U19	9	(6)
- * Club domestic league appearances and goals as of 00:49, 17 December 2019 (UTC)

Abdul Rahman Lestaluhu (born 23 August 1993) is an Indonesian former footballer who plays as a winger.

== Club career ==
He was signed by Persebaya from Visé in November 2013. Before Visé, he was part of Peñarol squad but did not made an appearance.

In December 2014, he signed with Persija.

== Honours ==
=== Club ===
Semen Padang

- Liga 2 runner-up: 2018
