= PS Mitra Kukar =

Association football team in Indonesia

Mitra Kukar
- Full name: Persatuan Sepakbola Mitra Kutai Kartanegara
- Nickname: Si Naga Mekes (The Fierce Dragon)
- Founded: 1979; 47 years ago, as NIAC Mitra; 1993; 33 years ago, as Mitra Surabaya; 1999; 27 years ago, as Mitra Kalteng Putra; 2003; 23 years ago, as PS Mitra Kukar
- Dissolved: 2023
- Ground: Aji Imbut Stadium
- Capacity: 35,000
- Owner: PT Kutai Kartanegara Sport Mandiri
- Chairman: Endri Erawan
- Head coach: Asep Suryadi
- League: Liga 4
- 2021: Liga 2/1st round (Group D), 6th (relegated)
- Website: www.mitrakukar.com
Home colours	Away colours

Persatuan Sepakbola Mitra Kutai Kartanegara (simply known as a PS Mitra Kukar) was an Indonesian professional football club based in Tenggarong, Kutai Kartanegara, East Kalimantan.

== History ==
This club was founded in 1979 as NIAC Mitra. NIAC stood for New International Amusement Center, a major casino in Surabaya during the 1970s. In 1983, the team played a friendly match against Arsenal F.C., winning by 2–0. NIAC was dissolved by its owner, Alexander Wenas, on 24 September 1990.

The club was revived under the name of Mitra Surabaya in 1993. After relegation to the First Division, the club moved to Palangkaraya, Central Kalimantan and were renamed Mitra Kalteng Putra (MKP) in 1999. At the end of 2001 season, the club was relegated to the Second Division. Financial problems led the club to be loaned to Suryanto Anwar, after which they moved again, to Tenggarong, Kutai Kartanegara, East Kalimantan, where they received its current name. The new ownership had a great impact. At the end of the 2003 season, Mitra Kukar were promoted to the First Division. In the 2005 season, the new owner fully bought Mitra Kukar. By the end of 2007 season, Mitra Kukar succeeded to be promoted to the Premier Division, after finishing first in the First Division. In the 2010–11 Premier Division, Mitra Kukar was promoted to the Indonesia Super League after finishing third in the final round.

Mitra Kukar disbanded after withdrawing from Liga 3 in the 2023–24 season.

== Sponsorship ==
=== Shirt sponsors ===
- Petrona
- Bank Kaltim

=== Other sponsors ===
- ABP
- PT. Beton Kaltim
- Kaltim Post

=== Kit provider ===
- 2015–present: Joma

== Honours ==
=== As NIAC Mitra ===
- Galatama
  - Champions (3): 1980–82, 1982–83, 1987–88
  - Runners-up: 1988–89
- Aga Khan Gold Cup (Note: The competition is widely regarded as the predecessor of AFC Champions League (held for the first time in 1967), since it was the first organized international competition that involved club teams around Asia, organized by the football authorities of East Pakistan, in collaboration with Asian Football Confederation (AFC).)
  - Champions: 1979

=== As Mitra Kukar ===
- General Sudirman Cup
  - Champions: 2015

== Season-by-season records ==
As Mitra Surabaya

Season	League/Division	Tms.	Pos.	Piala Indonesia	AFC competition(s)	
1994–95	Premier Division	34	7th, East division	–	–	–
1995–96	Premier Division	31	Semi-final	–	–	–
1996–97	Premier Division	33	Semi-final	–	–	–
1997–98	Premier Division	31	did not finish	–	–	–
1998–99	Premier Division	28	Withdrew	–	–	–
1999–2000	First Division	21	3rd, Group 3	–	–	–

As Mitra Kalteng Putra

Season	League/Division	Tms.	Pos.	Piala Indonesia	AFC competition(s)	
2001	First Division	23	5th, West group	–	–	–
2002	First Division	27	Relegated	–	–	–

As Mitra Kukar

Season	League/Division	Tms.	Pos.	Piala Indonesia	AFC competition(s)	
2003	Second Division	28	3	–	–	–
2004	First Division	24	10th, East division	–	–	–
2005	First Division	27	6th, Group 2	Second round	–	–
2006	First Division	36	5th, Group 4	First round	–	–
2007	First Division	40	Semi-final	Second round	–	–
2008–09	Premier Division	29	3rd, Second round	Second round	–	–
2009–10	Premier Division	33	8th, Group 2	–	–	–
2010–11	Premier Division	39	3	–	–	–
2011–12	Indonesia Super League	18	9	–	–	–
2013	Indonesia Super League	18	3	–	–	–
2014	Indonesia Super League	22	3rd, Second round	–	–	–
2015	Indonesia Super League	18	did not finish	–	–	–
2016	Indonesia Soccer Championship A	18	10	–	–	–
2017	Liga 1	18	10	–	–	–
2018	Liga 1	18	16	Round of 32	–	–
2019	Liga 2	23	4th, Second round	Round of 32	–	–
2020	Liga 2	24	did not finish	–	–	–
2021–22	Liga 2	24	6th, group D	–	–	–
2022–23	Liga 3	~	Season abandoned after due Kanjuruhan Stadium disaster		–	–
2023–24	Liga 3	~	withdrew	–	–	–
2024–25	Liga 4	~	did not participated	–	–	–

== Performance in AFC competitions ==
Performance as NIAC Mitra:

Season	Competition	Round	Nat.	Club	Home	Away
1988–89	Asian Club Championship	Qualifying round	(Brunei)	Bandaran KB	1–3	
1988–89	Asian Club Championship	Qualifying round	(Malaysia)	Pahang	0–0	
1988–89	Asian Club Championship	Qualifying round	(Thailand)	Royal Thai Air Force	2–1	
1988–89	Asian Club Championship	Qualifying round	(Singapore)	Geylang International	1–1	

== Coaching staff ==
Position	Name
Head coach	(Indonesia) Asep Suryadi
Assistant coach	(Indonesia) Hagi Permana
Fitness coach	(Indonesia) Jamal Abeta
Goalkeeper coach	(Indonesia) Joice Sorongan
Team doctor	(Indonesia) Radjiman
Masseur	(Indonesia) Uthe

=== Management ===
Position	Name
Chairman	(Indonesia) Endri Erawan
Manager	(Indonesia) Nor Alam
Secretary	(Indonesia) Trias Slamet
