= Gresik United F.C. =

Indonesian football club

Gresik United
- Full name: Gresik United Football Club
- Nicknames: Laskar Joko Samudro (Joko Samudro Warriors); Kebo Giras (The Mad Buffalo)
- Short name: GRE
- Founded: 2 December 2005; 20 years ago
- Ground: Gelora Joko Samudro Stadium
- Capacity: 25,000
- Owner: PT Gresik Usaha Sejahtera
- CEO: Nila Yani Hardiyanti
- Manager: Toriqi Fajerin
- Coach: Andik Ardiansyah
- League: Liga Nusantara
- 2025–26: Liga Nusantara/Regular Round (Group D), 4th
Home colours	Away colours

Gresik United Football Club, commonly known as GUFC, is an Indonesian professional football club based in Gresik, East Java. They currently compete in the Liga Nusantara.

== History ==
The club was founded as Petrokimia Putra Gresik, which was established on 20 May 1988. The club was funded by the fertilizer company, PT Petrokimia Gresik, which has been active in the Liga Indonesia Premier Division for more than 15 years. Petrokimia Putra competed in Galatama, which at the time was a professional football league in Indonesia. Petrokimia Putra merged with Persegres and became Gresik United.

When they first entered Galatama, Gresik already had Persegres Gresik playing in the same division. In fact, some of the first batch of Petrokimia Putra players were Persegres alumni. At that time, the enthusiasm of the people of Gresik was more inclined to Persegres than to Petrokimia Putra. Some of Petrokimia Putra's players who graduated from Persegres include Sasono Handito, Ferril Hattu, Rubianto, Reno Latupeirissa, Karyanto, Abdul Muis, Masrukan, Lutfi, Hasan Maghrobi, Derry Krisyanto.

When the first edition of Liga Indonesia Premier Division was held in 1994–95, Petrokimia Putra was given the title "Champion without trophy". In the final at Gelora Bung Karno Stadium, they lost to Persib Bandung with a score of 0–1. In fact, Petrokimia scored the first goal through Jacksen F. Tiago. However, the referee annulled it for no apparent reason. Petrokimia Putra became the champion of the 2002 Liga Indonesia Premier Division after beating Persita Tangerang at the final by a score 2–1. This achievement broke the hegemony of big city clubs in the main row of national football. Unfortunately, in the next season, Petrokimia was relegated to Liga Indonesia First Division. They qualified for the 2003 ASEAN Club Championship, which is the first edition of the Southeast Asia competition. This season they qualified to semi-final after defeating S.League club Singapore Armed Forces with a score of 3–2. On 2 December 2005, as a merger between two clubs from Gresik, which were Petrokimia and Persegres Gresik. Gresik United was established to replace Petrokimia Putra and Persegres, who once made City of Gresik the champion of Ligina. The cub is also known for their fanatical supporters, Ultras Gresik.

They played in the 2017 Liga 1 and only managed to finish in the last position of the Liga 1 standings by only collecting 10 points from 34 games (2 wins and 4 draws). With that result, Gresik United were relegated to the Liga 2. In the 2018 Liga 2, they again experienced the same thing, where they only finished in 10th place out of 12 teams in the East Region of Liga 2, so they were relegated in two consecutive seasons, now to the Liga 3. Until the 2021 season, Gresik United are still in the lowest tier of Liga 3. and in the 2021 Liga 3 East Java zone, they finished in 3rd position out of 69 clubs and qualified for the National Round.

== Players ==
As of December 2025

Note: Flags indicate national team as defined under FIFA eligibility rules; some limited exceptions apply. Players may hold more than one non-FIFA nationality.

No.	Pos.	Nation	Player
1	GK	IDN	Aldino Fafani
2	DF	IDN	Guntur Ariyadi (captain)
5	DF	IDN	Bhirawa Anoraga
6	DF	IDN	Divie Alviandi
8	MF	IDN	Muhammad Ghozy
9	FW	IDN	Alexandro Viko
10	MF	IDN	Rafi Herlian
11	FW	IDN	Fabio Papia
13	MF	IDN	Faizal Agung
14	DF	IDN	Arya Pratama
16	MF	IDN	Eduardus Aditya
17	FW	IDN	Rexa Abdi
18	MF	IDN	Rafli Bahasuan
20	FW	IDN	Roy Ivansyah
21	DF	IDN	Iswahyudi Ardinata

No.	Pos.	Nation	Player
22	MF	IDN	Alif Jaelani
24	FW	IDN	Muhammad Fauzi
25	GK	IDN	Muhammad Zubairivo
27	FW	IDN	Romeo Nizam
29	DF	IDN	Gardhika Arya Putra
33	DF	IDN	Ricky Novaldo
34	DF	IDN	Roberto Rigyaldo
35	MF	IDN	Syahrur Ramadhani
41	MF	IDN	Adil Nur Bangsawan
46	FW	IDN	Wahyu Agong
56	DF	IDN	Ilham Akbar
72	GK	IDN	Risky Sudirman
77	FW	IDN	Sayfullah Kader
85	FW	IDN	Dian Ardiansyah
99	GK	IDN	Dedi Tri Saputra

== Coaching staff ==
Position	Staff
Team manager	(Indonesia) Toriqi Fajerin
Head coach	(Indonesia) Andik Ardiansyah
Physical coach	(Indonesia) Devid Prisma Nugraha
Goalkeeper coach	(Indonesia) Dedy Sutanto

== Season by season records ==
Season	League/Division	Tms.	Pos.	Piala Indonesia	AFC competition(s)
2006	First Division	36	7th, Group 3	First round	–
2007	First Division	40	3rd, Group 3	Round of 16	–
2008–09	Premier Division	29	9th, Group 2	First round	–
2009–10	Premier Division	33	5th, Group 2	–	–
2010–11	Premier Division	39	3rd, Second round	–	–
2011–12	Indonesia Super League	18	15	–	–
2013	Indonesia Super League	18	9	–	–
2014	Indonesia Super League	22	9th, West division	–	–
2015	Indonesia Super League	18	did not finish	–	–
2016	Indonesia Soccer Championship A	18	17	–	–
2017	Liga 1	18	18	–	–
2018	Liga 2	24	10th, East division	Second round	–
2019	Liga 3	32	Eliminated in Pre-national route	Second round	–
2020	Liga 3	season abandoned		–	–
2021–22	Liga 3	64	2nd, Third round	–	–
2022–23	Liga 2	28	did not finish	–	–
2023–24	Liga 2	28	2nd, Championship round	–	–
2024–25	Liga 2	26	4th, Relegation round	–	–
2025–26	Liga Nusantara	24	4th, Group D	–	–
2026–27	Liga Nusantara	24	TBD	–	–

== Continental record ==
=== AFC competitions ===
As Petrokimia Putra

Season	Competition	Round	Nation	Club	Home	Away	Aggregate
1995	Asian Cup Winners' Cup	Second round	(Thailand)	Rajapracha UCOM FC	3–2	4–5	7–7 (a)
1995	Asian Cup Winners' Cup	Quarter-final	(Japan)	Bellmare Hiratsuka	1–1	0–6	1–7
2002–03	AFC Champions League	Qualifying round	(China)	Shanghai Shenhua	3–1	1–5	4–6

=== AFF competitions ===
As Petrokimia Putra

Season	Competition	Round	Nation	Club	Home	Away	Aggregate
2003	ASEAN Club Championship	Group A	(Cambodia)	Samart United	2–0		1st
2003	ASEAN Club Championship	Quarter-final	(Singapore)	Singapore Armed Forces	3–2 (a.e.t)		
2003	ASEAN Club Championship	Semi-final	(India)	Kingfisher East Bengal	1–1 (p) 6–7		
2003	ASEAN Club Championship	3rd place playoff	(Malaysia)	Perak FA	3–0		3rd place

== Honours ==
- Liga Indonesia Premier Division
  - Champions (1): 2002
