= 2018 Madura United F.C. season =

Madura United
2018 season
- Owner: Achsanul Qosasi
- Head coach: Gomes de Olivera
- Stadium: Gelora Ratu Pamelingan Stadium
- Liga 1: 3rd
- Piala Indonesia: Second round
- President's Cup: Quarter-finals
- Top goalscorer: League: Fabiano Beltrame (7); All: Greg Nwokolo (8)
- Highest home attendance: 13,410 vs. Persebaya Surabaya (25 May 2018)
- Lowest home attendance: 2,657 vs. Borneo (22 September 2018)
Home colours	Away colours
- All statistics correct as of 9 October 2018.

The 2018 season is Madura United Football Club's 3rd competitive season, and its 2nd consecutive season in the top-flight of Indonesian football.

== Players ==
As of 5 April 2018

Note: Flags indicate national team as defined under FIFA eligibility rules; some limited exceptions apply. Players may hold more than one non-FIFA nationality.

No.	Pos.	Nation	Player
1	GK	(Indonesia) IDN	Ravi Murdianto (on loan from PS TIRA)
2	DF	(Indonesia) IDN	Guntur Ariyadi
4	MF	(Indonesia) IDN	Asep Berlian
5	DF	(Indonesia) IDN	Munhar
6	DF	(Indonesia) IDN	Andik Rendika Rama
7	FW	(Indonesia) IDN	Engelbert Sani
8	MF	(Iran) IRN	Milad Zeneyedpour
10	MF	(Indonesia) IDN	Slamet Nurcahyono
11	FW	(Indonesia) IDN	Greg Nwokolo
12	DF	(Indonesia) IDN	Rifad Marasabessy
15	DF	(Brazil) BRA	Fabiano Beltrame (Vice-captain)
16	MF	(Indonesia) IDN	Rizky Dwi Febriyanto

No.	Pos.	Nation	Player
17	MF	(Indonesia) IDN	Lucky Wahyu
18	MF	(Indonesia) IDN	Irsan Lestaluhu
19	FW	(Indonesia) IDN	Imam Bagus
21	FW	(Mali) MLI	Mamadou Samassa
23	FW	(Indonesia) IDN	Bayu Gatra
26	DF	(Indonesia) IDN	Fachrudin Aryanto (Captain)
29	MF	(Liberia) LBR	Zah Rahan Krangar
32	DF	(Indonesia) IDN	Beny Wahyudi
66	DF	(Indonesia) IDN	Junda Irawan
77	GK	(Indonesia) IDN	Hery Prasetyo
80	DF	(Indonesia) IDN	Tanjung Sugiarto
86	DF	(Indonesia) IDN	Alfath Fathier
88	GK	(Indonesia) IDN	Satria Tama

=== Other players under contract ===
Note: Flags indicate national team as defined under FIFA eligibility rules; some limited exceptions apply. Players may hold more than one non-FIFA nationality.

No.	Pos.	Nation	Player
24	FW	(Nigeria) NGA	Peter Odemwingie

=== Out on loan ===
Note: Flags indicate national team as defined under FIFA eligibility rules; some limited exceptions apply. Players may hold more than one non-FIFA nationality.

No.	Pos.	Nation	Player
9	MF	(Indonesia) IDN	Raphael Maitimo (on loan to Persebaya until 31 December 2018)
22	FW	(Brazil) BRA	Beto (on loan to Perseru until 31 December 2018)

No.	Pos.	Nation	Player
30	GK	(Indonesia) IDN	Rafit Ikhwanudin (on loan to Cilegon United until 31 December 2018)
44	DF	(Indonesia) IDN	O.K. John (on loan to Persebaya until 31 December 2018)

== Transfers ==
=== 1st leg ===
In: Note: Flags indicate national team as defined under FIFA eligibility rules; some limited exceptions apply. Players may hold more than one non-FIFA nationality.

No.	Pos.	Nation	Player
8	MF	(Tajikistan) TJK	Nuriddin Davronov (from (Tajikistan) Istiklol)
9	MF	(Indonesia) IDN	Raphael Maitimo (from Persib Bandung)
17	MF	(Indonesia) IDN	Lucky Wahyu (from PS Barito Putera)
18	MF	(Indonesia) IDN	Irsan Lestaluhu
20	FW	(Indonesia) IDN	Cristian Gonzáles (from Arema)
29	MF	(Liberia) LBR	Zah Rahan Krangar (from (Malaysia) Felda United)
32	DF	(Indonesia) IDN	Beny Wahyudi (from Arema)
86	DF	(Indonesia) IDN	Alfath Fathier (from Persiba Balikpapan)
88	GK	(Indonesia) IDN	Satria Tama (from Gresik United)

Out: Note: Flags indicate national team as defined under FIFA eligibility rules; some limited exceptions apply. Players may hold more than one non-FIFA nationality.

No.	Pos.	Nation	Player
3	DF	(Indonesia) IDN	Eriyanto
8	MF	(Argentina) ARG	Gustavo López (to PS TIRA)
13	MF	(Australia) AUS	Dane Milovanović (to (Australia) Green Gully)
14	DF	(Indonesia) IDN	Rendy Siregar (to Mitra Kukar)
17	MF	(Indonesia) IDN	Aidun Sastra Utami
20	FW	(Brazil) BRA	Thiago Furtuoso (to Arema)
22	MF	(Indonesia) IDN	Fandi Utomo (to Persebaya Surabaya)
26	FW	(Indonesia) IDN	Rishadi Fauzi (to Persebaya Surabaya, previously loan)
27	FW	(Indonesia) IDN	Saldi (to PSM Makassar)
33	GK	(Indonesia) IDN	Muhammad Reza Pratama
—	GK	(Indonesia) IDN	Panggih Prio (loan return to Bhayangkara)

=== 2nd leg ===
In: Note: Flags indicate national team as defined under FIFA eligibility rules; some limited exceptions apply. Players may hold more than one non-FIFA nationality.

No.	Pos.	Nation	Player
1	GK	(Indonesia) IDN	Ravi Murdianto (on loan from PS TIRA)
8	FW	(Iran) IRN	Milad Zeneyedpour (from (Iran) Gostaresh Foulad)
21	FW	(Mali) MLI	Mamadou Samassa (from (Malaysia) T-Team)
66	DF	(Indonesia) IDN	Junda Irawan (from Arema)

Out: Note: Flags indicate national team as defined under FIFA eligibility rules; some limited exceptions apply. Players may hold more than one non-FIFA nationality.

No.	Pos.	Nation	Player
1	GK	(Indonesia) IDN	Angga Saputra (to PS TIRA)
8	MF	(Tajikistan) TJK	Nuriddin Davronov (to PSS Sleman)
9	MF	(Indonesia) IDN	Raphael Maitimo (loan to Persebaya)
14	FW	(Indonesia) IDN	Aqsaka Samuada Aji (to PSS Sleman)
20	FW	(Indonesia) IDN	Cristian Gonzáles (to PSS Sleman)
22	FW	(Brazil) BRA	Beto (loan to Perseru Serui)
30	GK	(Indonesia) IDN	Rafit Ikhwanudin (on loan to Cilegon United)
44	DF	(Indonesia) IDN	O.K. John (loan to Persebaya)

== Competitions ==
=== Liga 1 ===
Date	Opponents	H / A	Result F–A	Scorers	Attendance	League position
26 March 2018	PS Barito Putera	H	3–1	Maitimo 11', Gatra 78', Nwokolo 89'	5,465	
2 April 2018	PS TIRA	A	0–1		2,418	
7 April 2018	Sriwijaya	H	3–0	Fabiano Beltrame 83', Krangar 85', Gatra 90+2'	4,460	
13 April 2018	Mitra Kukar	A	1–3	Maitimo 35'	2,246	
21 April 2018	Arema	H	3–2	Nwokolo 43', Maitimo 73' (pen.), Davronov 87'	9,825	
27 April 2018	Borneo	A	2–2	Nwokolo 7', Beto 60'	8,724	
4 May 2018	Persib Bandung	H	2–1	Fabiano Beltrame (2) 38' (pen.), 81'	9,268	
12 May 2018	Persija Jakarta	A	2–0	Fabiano Beltrame 4', Krangar 79'	24,137	
19 May 2018	Persipura Jayapura	A	0–6		16,126	
25 May 2018	Persebaya Surabaya	H	2–2	Beto 4', Fabiano Beltrame 45'	13,410	
30 May 2018	PSM Makassar	A	0–2		13,736	
3 June 2018	Bali United	H	2–2	Nurcahyono 22', Beto 73'	7,500	
7 June 2018	Bhayangkara	A	0–1		1,355	
8 July 2018	PSMS Medan	H	1–0	Beto 6'	3,632	
12 July 2018	PSIS Semarang	A	0–0		8,415	
17 July 2018	Perseru Serui	H	2–0	Sani 14', Nurcahyono 89'	3,488	
23 July 2018	Persela Lamongan	A	1–1	Krangar 24'	7,469	
28 July 2018	PS Barito Putera	A	0–0		6,975	
3 August 2018	PS TIRA	H	3–1	Nurcahyono (2) 46', 82', Fabiano Beltrame 79'	3,282	
11 August 2018	Sriwijaya	A	2–1	Krangar 56', Samassa 84'	285	
13 September 2018	Mitra Kukar	H	2–0	Samassa 10', Nwokolo 72'	3,511	2nd
17 September 2018	Arema	A	0–2		2,710	3rd
22 September 2018	Borneo	H	1–2	Alves 14' (o.g.)	2,657	5th
9 October 2018	Persib Bandung	A	2–1	Fabiano Beltrame 27' (pen.), Krangar 59'	0	3rd

Locations of the 2018 Liga 1 teams

Pos	Team	Pld	W	D	L	GF	GA	GD	Pts
6	Arema	34	14	8	12	53	42	+11	50 (Note: Head-to-head results: Persebaya 1–0 Arema; Arema 1–0 Persebaya)
7	Borneo	34	14	6	14	50	49	+1	48 (Note: Head-to-head results: Madura United 1–2 Borneo, Borneo 2–2 Madura United)
8	Madura United	34	13	9	12	47	50	−3	48
9	Barito Putera	34	12	11	11	52	55	−3	47
10	PSIS	34	13	7	14	39	42	−3	46

Source: Go-Jek Liga 1^{[usurped]}, Soccerway
Rules for classification: 1) Points; 2) Head-to-head; 3) Goal difference; 4) Goals scored; 5) Drawing.

=== Piala Indonesia ===
Date	Round	Opponents	H / A	Result F–A	Scorers	Attendance
8 May 2018	First round	Persibo Bojonegoro	A	1–1 (a.e.t.) (3–1p)	Engelbert 13'	12,000

== Statistics ==
=== Appearances and goals ===
No.	Pos	Nat	Player	Total		Liga 1		Piala Indonesia		President's Cup	
No.	Pos	Nat	Player	Apps	Goals	Apps	Goals	Apps	Goals	Apps	Goals
Goalkeepers
1	GK	(Indonesia) IDN	Ravi Murdianto	0	0	0	0	0	0	0	0
77	GK	(Indonesia) IDN	Angga Saputra	5	0	5	0	0	0	0	0
88	GK	(Indonesia) IDN	Satria Tama	15	0	15	0	0	0	0	0
Defenders
2	DF	(Indonesia) IDN	Guntur Ariyadi	12	0	9+2	0	1	0	0	0
5	DF	(Indonesia) IDN	Munhar	8	0	5+2	0	1	0	0	0
6	DF	(Indonesia) IDN	Andik Rendika Rama	20	0	19+1	0	0	0	0	0
12	DF	(Indonesia) IDN	Rifad Marasabessy	1	0	1	0	0	0	0	0
15	DF	(Brazil) BRA	Fabiano Beltrame	23	8	21+2	7	0	0	0	1
18	DF	(Indonesia) IDN	Irsan Lestaluhu	1	0	0+1	0	0	0	0	0
26	DF	(Indonesia) IDN	Fachrudin Aryanto	18	0	16+2	0	0	0	0	0
32	DF	(Indonesia) IDN	Beny Wahyudi	20	0	19+1	0	0	0	0	0
66	DF	(Indonesia) IDN	Junda Irawan	1	0	0+1	0	0	0	0	0
80	DF	(Indonesia) IDN	Tanjung Sugiarto	0	0	0	0	0	0	0	0
86	DF	(Indonesia) IDN	Alfath Fathier	11	0	7+3	0	1	0	0	0
Midfielders
4	MF	(Indonesia) IDN	Asep Berlian	20	0	15+4	0	0+1	0	0	0
8	MF	(Iran) IRN	Milad Zeneyedpour	5	0	5	0	0	0	0	0
10	MF	(Indonesia) IDN	Slamet Nurcahyono	22	4	18+3	4	0+1	0	0	0
16	MF	(Indonesia) IDN	Rizky Dwi Febriyanto	5	0	0+5	0	0	0	0	0
17	MF	(Indonesia) IDN	Lucky Wahyu	7	0	2+4	0	1	0	0	0
29	MF	(Liberia) LBR	Zah Rahan Krangar	23	5	22	5	0+1	0	0	0
Forwards
7	FW	(Indonesia) IDN	Engelbert Sani	21	2	7+13	1	1	1	0	0
11	FW	(Indonesia) IDN	Greg Nwokolo	20	8	18+2	4	0	0	0	4
19	FW	(Indonesia) IDN	Imam Bagus	3	0	0+2	0	1	0	0	0
21	FW	(Mali) MLI	Mamadou Samassa	6	2	3+3	2	0	0	0	0
23	FW	(Indonesia) IDN	Bayu Gatra	23	4	16+7	2	0	0	0	2
Players out on loan
9	MF	(Indonesia) IDN	Raphael Maitimo	11	4	5+5	3	1	0	0	1
22	FW	(Brazil) BRA	Beto	18	4	15+2	4	1	0	0	0
30	GK	(Indonesia) IDN	Rafit Ikhwanudin	0	0	0	0	0	0	0	0
44	DF	(Indonesia) IDN	O.K. John	9	0	5+3	0	1	0	0	0
Players left during season
1	GK	(Indonesia) IDN	Angga Saputra	6	0	4+1	0	1	0	0	0
8	MF	(Tajikistan) TJK	Nuriddin Davronov	16	1	12+3	1	1	0	0	0
14	FW	(Indonesia) IDN	Aqsaka Samuada Aji	0	0	0	0	0	0	0	0
20	FW	(Indonesia) IDN	Cristian Gonzáles	1	2	0+1	0	0	0	0	2

Last updated: 9 October 2018
Source: Competitions
