= 2017 Madura United F.C. season =

Madura United
2017 season
- Owner: Ahsanul Qosasi
- Head coach: Gomes de Olivera
- Stadium: Gelora Ratu Pamelingan
- Liga 1: 6th
- President's Cup: Quarter-finals
- Top goalscorer: League: Peter Odemwingie (15); All: Greg Nwokolo (16)
- Highest home attendance: 6,326 vs Gresik United (1 June 2017)
- Lowest home attendance: 3,550 vs PS TNI (19 May 2017)
Home colours	Away colours

The 2017 season was Madura United's 2nd competitive season and 1st season in the top flight of Indonesia football (2016 Indonesia Soccer Championship A was not counted as an official league) and Liga 1.

== Coaching staff ==
Position	Staff
Head coach	(Brazil) Gomes de Olivera
Assistant coach	(Indonesia) Winnedy Purwito
Goalkeeper coach	(Indonesia) Hermansyah
Team analysis	(Brazil) Fabio Olivera

Source: Bola Madura

== Squad information ==
Squad No.	Name	Nationality	Date of birth (age)
Goalkeepers
1	Angga Saputra	(Indonesia)	30 November 1993 (age 32)
33	Muhammad Reza Pratama U23	(Indonesia)	30 July 1996 (age 30)
77	Hery Prasetyo	(Indonesia)	28 April 1985 (age 41)
Defenders
2	Guntur Ariyadi	(Indonesia)	18 March 1987 (age 39)
3	Eriyanto U23	(Indonesia)	12 March 1996 (age 30)
5	Munhar	(Indonesia)	5 October 1986 (age 40)
6	Andik Rendika Rama	(Indonesia)	16 March 1993 (age 33)
14	Rendy Siregar	(Indonesia)	14 September 1986 (age 40)
15	Fabiano Beltrame FP	(Brazil)	29 August 1982 (age 44)
29	Fachrudin Aryanto	(Indonesia)	19 February 1989 (age 37)
Midfielders
4	Asep Berlian	(Indonesia)	11 July 1990 (age 36)
8	Bayu Gatra	(Indonesia)	11 November 1991 (age 34)
10	Slamet Nurcahyono	(Indonesia)	11 July 1984 (age 42)
12	Rifad Marasabessy U23	(Indonesia)	6 July 1999 (age 27)
13	Dane Milovanović FP	(Serbia)	2 December 1989 (age 36)
16	Rizky Dwi Febriyanto U23	(Indonesia)	22 February 1997 (age 29)
18	Redouane Zerzouri FP INJ	(Morocco)	27 April 1989 (age 37)
22	Fandi Utomo	(Indonesia)	2 March 1991 (age 35)
27	Saldi	(Indonesia)	
81	Tanjung Sugiarto U23	(Indonesia)	11 May 1999 (age 27)
Strikers
7	Engelbert Sani	(Indonesia)	28 May 1990 (age 36)
9	Greg Nwokolo	(Indonesia)	3 January 1986 (age 40)
24	Peter Odemwingie MP	(Nigeria)	15 July 1981 (age 45)
27	Boubacar Sanogo FP	(Ivory Coast)	17 December 1982 (age 43)
39	Guy Junior	(Indonesia)	30 August 1986 (age 40)

- FP = Foreign player
- INJ = Injury foreign player
- MP = Marquee player
- U23 = Under-23 player

== Competitions ==
=== Overview ===
Competition	Record								Started round	Final position / round	First match	Last match
Competition	G	W	D	L	GF	GA	GD	Win %	Started round	Final position / round	First match	Last match
Liga 1	10	5	4	1	16	9	+7	50.00	—	In Progress	16 April 2017	In Progress
Total	10	5	4	1	16	9	+7	50.00				

Updated to match played 7 June 2017
Source: Competitions

=== Liga 1 ===
==== League table ====
Locations of the 2017 Liga 1 teams

Pos	Team	Pld	W	D	L	GF	GA	GD	Pts	Qualification or relegation
4	Persija	34	17	10	7	48	24	+24	61	Qualification for the AFC Cup group stage (Note: PSM failed to obtain an AFC license to participate in Asian competitions. As a result, Persija, the league 4th place, entered the group stage.)
5	Persipura	34	17	9	8	64	37	+27	60	
6	Madura United (Note: Madura United were deducted three points due to FIFA sanction. Madura United would have qualified for the AFC Cup group stage had Bali United qualified for the AFC Champions League group stage. As Bali United failed to qualify for the AFC Champions League group stage, Madura United's qualification in the AFC Cup was annulled.)	34	17	9	8	58	44	+14	57	
7	Barito Putera	34	15	8	11	48	44	+4	53	
8	Borneo	34	15	7	12	50	39	+11	52	

Source: Go-Jek Traveloka Liga 1, Soccerway
Rules for classification: 1) Points; 2) Head-to-head; 3) Goal Difference; 4) Goals Scored; 5) Drawing.

==== Results summary ====
Overall								Home						Away					
Pld	W	D	L	GF	GA	GD	Pts	W	D	L	GF	GA	GD	W	D	L	GF	GA	GD
26	14	6	6	47	30	+17	48	11	3	0	33	9	+24	3	3	6	14	21	−7

Last updated: 26 September 2017.
Source: Soccerway

==== Results by matchday ====
Matchday	1	2	3	4	5	6	7	8	9	10	11	12	13	14	15	16	17	18	19	20	21	22	23	24	25	26	27	28	29	30	31	32	33	34
Ground	H	A	H	A	H	A	H	A	H	H	H	A	H	A	H	A	H	H	A	H	A	A	H	A	H	A	A	A	H	A	H	A	H	A
Result	W	L	D	W	D	D	W	D	W	W	W	L	W	L	W	D	W	W	L	D	L	L	W	W	W	W								
Position	2	10	9	6	7	9	4	5	2	2	2	2	2	3	3	3	3	3	3	3	4	4	4	4	4	4								

Updated to match(es) played on 26 September 2017. Source: Madura United F.C.
A = Away; H = Home; W = Win; D = Draw; L = Loss

==== Matches ====
Win Draw Loss

The fixtures for the 2017 season were announced on 16 April 2017.

16 April 2017 1	Madura United	2–0	Bali United	Pamekasan
15:00	Gatra 33'; Odemwingie 73' (pen.); Febriyanto (yellow card) 30'; Marasabessy (yellow card) 55'; Nurcahyono (yellow card) 67'; Zerzouri (yellow card) 86'	Report	Ahn Byung-keon (yellow card) 20'; Abdul Rahman (yellow card) 73'	Stadium: Gelora Ratu Pamelingan; Attendance: 6,198; Referee: Abdul Rahman Salasa

21 April 2017 2	Persela Lamongan	2–0	Madura United	Lamongan
18:30	Al-Ayyubi 38'; Carlos 90'; Arifin (yellow card) 10'; Rosário (yellow card) 17'; Al-Ayyubi (yellow card) 60'; Haq (yellow card) 70'	Report	Febriyanto (yellow card) 8'; Odemwingie (yellow card) 31'; Munhar (yellow card) 45'	Stadium: Surajaya; Attendance: 12,052; Referee: Novari Ikhsan Arilaha

28 April 2017 3	Madura United	2–2	Mitra Kukar	Pamekasan
15:00	Odemwingie 2'; Milovanović 53'; Febriyanto (yellow card) 47'; Sani (yellow card) 75'; Berlian (yellow card) 79'; Milovanović (yellow card) 81'	Report	Santos 24'; Erminarno 82'; Gotor (yellow card) 15'	Stadium: Gelora Ratu Pamelingan; Attendance: 4,616; Referee: Hadiyana

4 May 2017 4	Persija Jakarta	0–1	Madura United	Bekasi
18:30	Zein (yellow card) 41'	Report	Odemwingie 69'; Sugiarto (yellow card) 24'; Milovanović (yellow card) 65'; Berlian (yellow card) 68'; Beltrame (yellow card) 73'; Odemwingie (yellow card) 90+1'	Stadium: Patriot; Attendance: 25,400; Referee: Hamsir

8 May 2017 5	Madura United	1–1	Perseru Serui	Pamekasan
19:00	Odemwingie 22'	Report	Uropmabin 36'; Meosido (yellow card) 55'; Uropmabin (yellow card) 86'	Stadium: Gelora Ratu Pamelingan; Attendance: 6,232; Referee: Adung

14 May 2017 6	Arema	1–1	Madura United	Malang
18:30	Gonzáles 71' (pen.); Alfarizi (yellow card) 88'	Report	Milovanović 54'; Sani (yellow card) 45+1'; Gatra (yellow card) 63'; Nurcahyono (yellow card) 82'	Stadium: Kanjuruhan; Attendance: 14,240; Referee: Asep Yandis

19 May 2017 7	Madura United	4–1	PS TNI	Pamekasan
18:30	Nwokolo 17'; Odemwingie 42'; Nurcahyono 59'; Milovanović 64'; Milovanović (yellow card) 5'; Prasetyo (yellow card) 71'	Report	Núñez 47'; Núñez (yellow card) 15'; Ariyanto (yellow card) 68'; Mukti (yellow card) 78'; Irfandi (yellow card) 82'	Stadium: Gelora Ratu Pamelingan Stadium; Attendance: 3,550; Referee: Adi Riyanto

27 May 2017 8	Sriwijaya	0 - 0	Madura United	Palembang
20:30	Satria (yellow card) 57'	Report	Ariyadi (yellow card) 32'; Berlian (yellow card) 70'; Febriyanto (yellow card) 75'; Odemwingie (yellow card) 90'	Stadium: Gelora Sriwijaya Stadium; Attendance: 4,750; Referee: (Indonesia) Bandung Yudi Nurcahya

1 June 2017 9	Madura United	3 - 2	Gresik United	Pamekasan
21:30	Sanogo 11'; Utomo 16'; Nurcahyono (yellow card) 41'; Gatra 52'; Ariyadi (yellow card) 90+2'	Report	Yusgiantoro 18' (yellow card) 18' (goal) 68'; Dave Mustaine (yellow card) 26'	Stadium: Gelora Ratu Pamelingan Stadium; Attendance: 6,326; Referee: (Indonesia) Novari Ikhsan Arilaha

7 June 2017 10	Madura United	2 - 0	Persipura Jayapura	Pamekasan
21:30	Nwokolo 38'; Ariyadi (yellow card) 47' (yellow-red card); Febriyanto (yellow card) 54'; Odemwingie 65' (pen.)	Report	Kabes (yellow card) 24'; Solossa (yellow card) 24' (yellow-red card); Sanadi (yellow card) 57'	Stadium: Gelora Ratu Pamelingan Stadium; Attendance: 6,200; Referee: (Indonesia) Angus Arifin

12 June 2017 11	Madura United	6 - 0	Semen Padang	Pamekasan
21:30	Odemwingie 18' 43' 63'; Munhar (yellow card) 28'; Marasabessy (yellow card) 35'; Nwokolo 37' 65'; Gatra 69' (pen.)	Report		Stadium: Gelora Ratu Pamelingan Stadium; Attendance: 4,180; Referee: (Indonesia) Abdul Salasa

4 July 2017 12	Borneo	3 - 0	Madura United	Samarinda
16:00	Flávio 5' 45' (pen.); Michiels (yellow card) 34'; Abdul Rahman (yellow card) 67'; Smeltz 78'; Matheus Lopes (yellow card) 90+1'	Report	Fabiano Beltrame (yellow card) 65'	Stadium: Segiri Samarinda Stadium; Attendance: 8,277; Referee: (Indonesia) Adi Riyanto

9 July 2017 13	Madura United	3 - 1	Persib Bandung	Bangkalan
19:30	Odemwingie 21' (pen.) 66'; Nurcahyono (yellow card) 25'; Sani (yellow card) 49'; Berlian (yellow card) 56'; Nwokolo 87'	Report	Kusnandar (yellow card) 32'; Maitimo 82'	Stadium: Gelora Bangkalan Stadium; Attendance: 14,000; Referee: (Indonesia) Kusni Samarinda

13 July 2017 14	Bhayangkara	2 - 1	Madura United	Bekasi
19:30	Sanda 72'; Tuasalamony (yellow card) 77'; Armaiyn 83'	Report	Odemwingie 45+1'	Stadium: Patriot Stadium; Attendance: 2,600; Referee: (Indonesia) Medan Suprapto

17 July 2017 15	Madura United	1 - 0	Persiba Balikpapan	Bangkalan
16:00	Odemwingie 37'; Berlian (yellow card) 77'	Report	Yoewanto Setya Beny (yellow card) 26'; Turnando (yellow card) 64'	Stadium: Gelora Bangkalan Stadium; Attendance: 2,079; Referee: (Indonesia) Faulur Rosy

22 July 2017 16	Barito Putera	2 - 2	Madura United	Banjarmasin
16:00	Telaubun (yellow card) 4'; Sitanggang 20'; Córdoba (yellow card) 82'; Pora 89'	Report	Gatra (yellow card) 4'; Nwokolo 7' (yellow card) 49'; Fabiano Beltrame 30'; Febriyanto (yellow card) 35'; Odemwingie (yellow card) 89'	Stadium: May 17th Stadium; Attendance: 5,942; Referee: (Indonesia) Musthofa Umarella

29 July 2017 17	Madura United	1 - 0	PSM Makassar	Bangkalan
16:00	Fabiano Beltrame (yellow card) 52'; Nwokolo 60'	Report	Siregar (yellow card) 82'	Stadium: Gelora Bangkalan Stadium; Attendance: 5,265; Referee: (Indonesia) Annas Apriliandi

4 August 2017 18	Madura United	2 - 1	Persela	Pamekasan
16:00	Nurcahyono 12'; Munhar (yellow card) 76'; Utomo 82'; Odemwingie (yellow card) 90+3'	Report	Arifin (yellow card) 25'; Uchida 31'; Rio Pratama (yellow card) 49'; Ivan Carlos (yellow card) 70'; Walidan (yellow card) 89'	Stadium: Gelora Ratu Pamelingan Stadium; Attendance: 4,429; Referee: (Indonesia) Aprisman Aranda

13 August 2017 19	Bali United	5 - 2	Madura United	Gianyar Regency
18:30	van der Velden 6' (yellow card) 41'; Comvalius 14' 22' (pen.) 63' (pen.); Sulaiman (yellow card) 36'; Sukadana 66'; Angga Putra (yellow card) 69'; Nanak (yellow card) 72'	Report	Fabiano Beltrame 37' (pen.) (yellow card) 62'; Rama (yellow card) 72'; Gatra 83' (yellow card) 90+3'; Aryanto (yellow card) 90+1'	Stadium: Kapten I Wayan Dipta Stadium; Attendance: 21,517; Referee: (Australia) Shaun Evans

21 August 2017 20	Madura United	1 - 1	Persija Jakarta	Pamekasan
18:30	Nwokolo (yellow card) 45+2' (goal) 64'	Report	Willian Pacheco 69'; Widodo (yellow card) 76'	Stadium: Gelora Ratu Pamelingan Stadium; Attendance: 5,202; Referee: (Kyrgyzstan) Spartak Danilenko

28 August 2017 21	Perseru Serui	2 - 0	Madura United	Yapen Islands Regency
13:30	Aimé 16'; Escobar 62'	Report	Siregar (yellow card) 72'; Munhar (yellow card) 90+3'	Stadium: Marora Stadium; Attendance: 1,626; Referee: (Indonesia) Novari Arilaha

== Statistics ==
=== Appearances ===
No.	Pos.	Name	Liga 1		Total		Discipline	
No.	Pos.	Name	Apps	Goals	Apps	Goals	Yellow card	Red card
1	GK	(Indonesia) Angga Saputra	2	0	2	0	0	0
2	DF	(Indonesia) Guntur Ariyadi	0	0	0	0	0	0
3	DF	(Indonesia) Eriyanto	0 (1)	0	1	0	0	0
4	MF	(Indonesia) Asep Berlian	3 (1)	0	4	0	2	0
5	DF	(Indonesia) Munhar	1 (1)	0	2	0	1	0
6	DF	(Indonesia) Andik Rendika Rama	2 (2)	0	4	0	0	0
7	FW	(Indonesia) Engelbert Sani	1 (1)	0	2	0	1	0
8	MF	(Indonesia) Bayu Gatra	3	1	3	1	0	0
9	FW	(Indonesia) Greg Nwokolo	0 (2)	0	2	0	0	0
10	FW	(Indonesia) Slamet Nurcahyono	3 (1)	0	4	0	1	0
12	MF	(Indonesia) Rifad Marasabessy	4	0	4	0	1	0
13	MF	(Serbia) Dane Milovanović	2 (1)	0	3	1	2	0
14	DF	(Indonesia) Rendy Siregar	1	0	1	0	0	0
15	DF	(Brazil) Fabiano Beltrame	3	0	3	0	1	0
16	MF	(Indonesia) Rizky Dwi Febriyanto	3	0	3	0	3	0
17	FW	(Indonesia) Elthon Maran	0	0	0	0	0	0
18	MF	(Morocco) Redouane Zerzouri	1 (1)	0	2	0	1	0
21	FW	(Indonesia) Fredy Isir	0	0	0	0	0	0
22	MF	(Indonesia) Fandi Utomo	0	0	0	0	0	0
24	FW	(Nigeria) Peter Odemwingie	3 (1)	3	4	3	2	0
26	DF	(Indonesia) Fachrudin Aryanto	4	0	4	0	0	0
27	FW	(Ivory Coast) Boubacar Sanogo	0 (1)	0	1	0	0	0
33	GK	(Indonesia) Muhammad Reza Pratama	0	0	0	0	0	0
77	GK	(Indonesia) Hery Prasetyo	2	0	2	0	0	0
81	MF	(Indonesia) Tanjung Sugiarto	1	0	1	0	1	0
90	MF	(Indonesia) Saldi	4	0	4	0	0	0

Last updated: 4 May 2017.
Source: Madura United F.C.

=== Top scorers ===
The list is sorted by shirt number when total goals are equal.

Rnk	Pos	No.	Player	Liga 1	Total
1	FW	24	(Nigeria) Peter Odemwingie	6	6
2	MF	13	(Serbia) Dane Milovanović	3	3
3	MF	8	(Indonesia) Bayu Gatra	2	2
3	FW	9	(Indonesia) Greg Nwokolo	2	2
4	MF	10	(Indonesia) Slamet Nurcahyono	1	1
4	MF	22	(Indonesia) Fandi Utomo	1	1
4	FW	27	(Ivory Coast) Boubacar Sanogo	1	1
Total				16	16

Last updated: 7 June 2017.
Source: Madura United F.C.

=== Top assists ===
The list is sorted by shirt number when total assists are equal.

Rnk	Pos	No.	Player	Liga 1	Total
1	MF	10	(Indonesia) Slamet Nurcahyono	4	4
2	FW	24	(Nigeria) Peter Odemwingie	3	3
3	MF	8	(Indonesia) Bayu Gatra	1	1
3	FW	9	(Indonesia) Greg Nwokolo	1	1
3	MF	22	(Indonesia) Fandi Utomo	1	1
Total				10	10

Last updated: 7 June 2017.
Source: Madura United F.C.

=== Clean sheets ===
The list is sorted by shirt number when total clean sheets are equal.

Rnk	No.	Player	Liga 1	Total
1	1	(Indonesia) Angga Saputra	2	2
1	77	(Indonesia) Hery Prasetyo	2	2
Total			4	4

Last updated: 7 June 2017.
Source: Madura United F.C.

=== Attendances ===
Week	Date	Against	Attendance
1	16 April 2017	Bali United	6,198
2	28 April 2017	Mitra Kukar	4,616
3	8 May 2017	Perseru Serui	6,232
4	19 May 2017	PS TNI	3,550
5	1 June 2017	Gresik United	6,326
6	7 June 2017	Persipura Jayapura	6,200

=== Summary ===
Games played	5 (5 Liga 1)
Games won	2 (2 Liga 1)
Games drawn	2 (2 Liga 1)
Games lost	1 (1 Liga 1)
Goals scored	6 (6 Liga 1)
Goals conceded	5 (5 Liga 1)
Goal difference	+1 (+1 Liga 1)
Clean sheets	2 (2 Liga 1)
Yellow cards	16 (16 Liga 1)
Red cards	0 (0 Liga 1)
Best result(s)	2–0 (H) v Bali United – Liga 1 – 16 April 2017
Worst result(s)	0–2 (A) v Persela Lamongan – Liga 1 – 21 April 2017
Most appearances	
Top scorer	(Nigeria) Peter Odemwingie (4 goals)
Top assist	(Indonesia) Slamet Nurcahyono (4 assists)
Winning Percentage	Overall: 2/5 (40.00%)

Last updated: 8 May 2017.
Source: Madura United F.C.
