= 2015 Persebaya Surabaya (ISL) season =

Bhayangkara F.C.
2015 season
- Owner: PT. Mitra Muda Inti Berlian
- Chairman: Diar Kusuma Putra
- Head Coach: Ibnu Grahan
- Stadium: Gelora Bung Tomo
Home colours	Away colours

The 2015 Bhayangkara F.C. season is the 5th season in the club's football history, the 2nd consecutive season in the top-flight Liga Indonesia season and the 2nd season competing in the Indonesia Super League since their existence in 2010 after the acquisition of league slots and membership from Persikubar West Kutai.

== Review and events ==
=== Pre–2015 ===
Rahmad Darmawan has been sacked as a coach because failed to meet the target.

=== January ===
In 2015 Gubernur Jatim Cup, Persebaya Surabaya (ISL) failed to advance the final after draw and lose in group stage versus Persekap Pasuruan and Gresik United, respectively.

=== February ===
Persebaya Surabaya (ISL) held a trial match against the local team, Pesawat FC, Friday (27/2) afternoon. This trial is the first after confirmation of the postponement of the 2015 Indonesia Super League (ISL) competition from the end of February to the beginning of April.

=== March ===
Persebaya Surabaya (ISL) held friendly matches against several teams from Central Java. In the first match (6 March 2015), they managed to beat hosts Persip Pekalongan with a score of 5-1. A total of five Persebaya goals were scored by Otavio Putra in the 45th and 90th minutes, Slamet Nurcahyo (49th), Emille Mbamba (57th), and Subo Seto in the 84th minute while Persip's goal was created by Elly Eboy in the 20th minute. In the second match (8 March 2015), the host team PSCS Cilacap managed to hold Persebaya Surabaya (ISL) to a 0–0 draw in a trial match at the Wijayakusuma Stadium, Cilacap, Central Java, Sunday evening. After friendlies in Central Java, Persebaya Surabaya (ISL) confirmed that it will participate in the triangular tournament in Ciamis with PSGC Ciamis and Persib Bandung which will be held at the Galuh Stadium, Ciamis Regency, West Java, on 20-24 March 2015. In the trial match on March 12 2015, Persebaya Surabaya (ISL) was only able to play a draw when competing against the East Java (Jatim) football team projected for the XIX West Java (Jabar) National Sports Week (PON) 2016. The team made by Ibnu Grahan was forced to play a 2–2 draw. Persebaya Surabaya (ISL) crushed host PSGC Ciamis with a score of 3–0 in a triangular tournament match at Galuh Ciamis Stadium, Friday (20/3/2015). Two of Persebaya (ISL)'s goals were scored by Emile Mbamba, while another goal was scored by Rudi Widodo. Persebaya Surabaya (ISL) beat Persib Bandung with a score of 1–0 in a match at the Galuh Stadium, Ciamis, West Java, on Sunday (22/3/2015), thereby winning the triangular tournament which was also attended by host PSGC Ciamis. The only goal was contributed by Emile Mbamba when the match had just entered the 2nd minute. On March 23 2015, Persebaya 1927 filed a lawsuit against Persebaya Surabaya (ISL) which is currently competing in the Indonesia Super League, to the Surabaya District Court (PN Surabaya). The lawsuit was also addressed to the PSSI. The lawsuits raised are regarding legality. The Persebaya Surabaya schism polemic is still continuing.

=== April ===
Persebaya Surabaya (ISL) and Arema Cronus were not included in the list of clubs recommended by BOPI to take part in ISL 2015. BOPI emphasized that the reason for excluding both of them was due to legality issues. Even though he cannot take part in ISL this season due to legality issues, the CEO of Persebaya (ISL), I Gede Widiade, will not comply with BOPI's decision and is adamant about continuing to appear in the competition. Persebaya Surabaya (ISL) managed to defeat Mitra Kukar with a score of 1–0 in the inaugural Qatar National Bank (QNB) match at the Gelora Bung Tomo Stadium in Surabaya, Sunday evening, 5 April 2015. The only goal was scored by Persebaya (ISL) player number 8, Slamet Nurcahyo, in the 16th minute. Emile Mbamba late goal in the 94th minute saved Persebaya Surabaya (ISL) from defeat when they hosted Pusamania Borneo in the second match of the Indonesian Super League which ended with a score of 1–1 at the Gelora Bung Tomo Stadium in Surabaya, Wednesday night (8/4/2015).

=== May ===
The court session regarding Persebaya schism (Persebaya 1927 vs Persebaya Surabaya (ISL)) at the Surabaya District Court (PN Surabaya), Tuesday (12/5/2015) was finally postponed by the panel of judges due to the absence of PSSI as the defendant.

=== August ===
To qualify Persebaya Surabaya (ISL) for the President's Cup tournament, BOPI, Mahaka and Persebaya (ISL) management finally agreed to change the name to Persebaya United.

=== September ===
Persebaya United management finally announced the new name and logo, Saturday (26/9/2015) morning at a restaurant in the South Surabaya area. The team based in Jemursari decided to use the name Bonek F.C. in the 2015 Indonesia President's Cup tournament. The name change is a follow-up to the decision letter of the Director General of Intellectual Property Rights (HKI) of the Ministry of Law and Human Rights which states that Persebaya 1927 is the holder of trademark rights to the name and logo of Persebaya Surabaya. As well as pressure from the Transition Team and the Indonesian Professional Sports Agency (BOPI). Persebaya United officially changed its name to Bonek F.C. entering the 2015 Indonesia President's Cup quarter-finals.

=== October ===
The Bonek F.C. team has certainly changed its name to Surabaya United to compete in the General Sudirman Cup tournament. The club owned by Gede Widiade emphasized that the name change was only intended for the General Sudirman Cup tournament. Thus, the team which is based in South Jemursari has changed its name four times. Previously they used the name Persebaya Surabaya (ISL). Then it changed to Persebaya United in the 2015 Indonesia President's Cup group stage. In the quarter-finals, they used a new name, Bonek F.C.. This name survived until they carried out a walkover (WO) against Sriwijaya F.C. in Palembang. And in the General Sudirman Cup tournament, this team decided to use the name Surabaya United.

== Matches ==
=== Legend ===
Win Draw Loss Postponed

=== Friendlies ===
Date	KO	Stadium	City	Opponent	Result^{4}	Attendance	Goalscorers		Source
Date	KO	Stadium	City	Opponent	Result^{4}	Attendance	Bhayangkara FC	Opponent	Source
22 December 2014		H	Surabaya	81 FC	4 – 0		Montalvo; Utomo; Aryo; Dutra		
3 January 2015		A	Pasuruan	Persekap Pasuruan	1 – 1		Siswanto 24'	Bagus Cahyo 21'	
4 January 2014		A	Pasuruan	Gresik United	1 – 2		Apriansyah 76'	Kamri 8'; Lopez 61'	
8 January 2015		H	Surabaya	Pra PON Jatim	4 – 1		Dutra; Armaiyn; Di Piedi	Imam Baihaki	
17 January 2015		N	Padang	Semen Padang	1 – 0		Armaiyn 35'		
19 January 2015		N	Padang	Persija Jakarta	1 – 1		Dutra 87' (pen.)	Ambrizal 73'	
21 January 2015		N	Padang	Sriwijaya	1 – 1		Dutra 76' (pen.)	Sinaga 50'	
25 January 2015		N	Palembang	Arema Cronus	0 – 1			Gonzáles 109'	
27 January 2015		N	Palembang	Persela Lamongan	1 – 0		Dutra 110' (pen.)		
6 February 2015		N	Badung	Bali United Pusam F.C.	0 – 1			Lerby 27'	
27 February 2015		N	Sidoarjo	Pesawat F.C.	4 - 0				
1 March 2015		N	Sidoarjo	Persebo Bondowoso	4 - 0				
6 March 2015		A	Pekalongan	Persip Pekalongan	5 - 1		Dutra 45', 90'; Slamet Nurcahyono 49'; Emile Mbamba 57'; Wahyu Subo Seto 84'	Ellie Aiboy 20'	
8 March 2015		A	Cilacap	PSCS Cilacap	0 – 0				
13 March 2015		N	Sidoarjo	PON Jatim	2 - 2				
20 March 2015		A	Ciamis	PSGC Ciamis	3 - 0		Emile Mbamba 69', 90'; Rudi Widodo 73'		
22 March 2015		N	Ciamis	Persib Bandung	1 - 0		Emile Mbamba 2'		
12 August 2015		H	Surabaya	Persekap Pasuruan	1 - 1				
27 August 2015		H	Surabaya	Pra-PON Papua Barat	1 - 0				
2 September 2015		N	Bandung	Martapura F.C.	0 - 0				
6 September 2015		A	Bandung	Persib Bandung	0 - 2			Zulham 10'; Tantan 52'	
10 September 2015		N	Bandung	Persiba Balikpapan	4 - 1		Pedro Velázquez 3', 26', 44', 80'	Bayu Pradana 15' (pen.)	
20 September 2015		H	Surabaya	Sriwijaya F.C.	1 - 0		Slamet Nurcahyono 84'		
27 September 2015		A	Palembang	Sriwijaya F.C.	0 - 3 (w/o)		Ilham Armaiyn 5'		

=== Indonesia Super League ===
Date	KO	Stadium	City	Opponent	Result^{4}	Attendance	Goalscorers		Source
Date	KO	Stadium	City	Opponent	Result^{4}	Attendance	Bhayangkara FC	Opponent	Source
5 April 2015	19:00	H	Surabaya	Mitra Kukar	1 – 0	2,278	Slamet 16'		
8 April 2015	19:00	H	Surabaya	Pusamania Borneo	1 – 1	1,676	Mbamba 90'	Lopičić 67'	

== Statistics ==
=== Squad ===
As of 9 April 2015.

No.	Pos	Nat	Player	Total		Indonesia Super League		Piala Indonesia	
No.	Pos	Nat	Player	Apps	Goals	Apps	Goals	Apps	Goals
1	GK	(Indonesia) IDN	Yandri Pitoy	2	0	2	0	0	0
2	DF	(Indonesia) IDN	Putu Gede Juni Antara	2	0	2	0	0	0
3	DF	(Indonesia) IDN	Dany Saputra	2	0	2	0	0	0
4	MF	(Indonesia) IDN	Asep Berlian	1	0	1	0	0	0
5	DF	(Brazil) BRA	Otávio Dutra	2	0	2	0	0	0
6	MF	(Indonesia) IDN	Evan Dimas	2	0	2	0	0	0
7	MF	(Indonesia) IDN	Siswanto	2	0	2	0	0	0
8	MF	(Indonesia) IDN	Slamet Nurcahyono	2	1	2	1	0	0
9	MF	(Indonesia) IDN	Wahyu Subo Seto	0	0	0	0	0	0
10	FW	(Indonesia) IDN	Rudi Widodo	2	0	2	0	0	0
16	MF	(Indonesia) IDN	Zulfiandi	2	0	2	0	0	0
17	MF	(Indonesia) IDN	Wage Dwi Aryo	0	0	0	0	0	0
20	FW	(Indonesia) IDN	Ilham Armaiyn	2	0	2	0	0	0
21	DF	(Indonesia) IDN	Yesaya Desnam	0	0	0	0	0	0
22	FW	(Indonesia) IDN	Fandi Utomo	2	0	2	0	0	0
27	MF	(Indonesia) IDN	Muhammad Fauzan Jamal	0	0	0	0	0	0
44	FW	(Cameroon) CMR	Émile Mbamba	2	1	2	1	0	0
46	DF	(Indonesia) IDN	Firly Apriansyah	2	0	2	0	0	0
53	DF	(Indonesia) IDN	Munhar	0	0	0	0	0	0
77	GK	(Indonesia) IDN	Hery Prasetyo	0	0	0	0	0	0
81	MF	(Indonesia) IDN	Muhammad Hargianto	1	0	1	0	0	0
	GK	(Indonesia) IDN	Thomas Ryan Bayu	0	0	0	0	0	0
	DF	(Indonesia) IDN	Muhammad Sahrul Kurniawan	0	0	0	0	0	0
	DF	(Indonesia) IDN	Muhammad Fathurochman	0	0	0	0	0	0
	DF	(Indonesia) IDN	Heri Setiawan	0	0	0	0	0	0
	DF	(Indonesia) IDN	Mochammad Zaenuri	0	0	0	0	0	0
	MF	(Indonesia) IDN	Bima Ragil						
	MF	(Indonesia) IDN	Reza Mustofa	0	0	0	0	0	0
	FW	(Cameroon) CMR	Eric Djemba-Djemba	0	0	0	0	0	0
	FW	(Argentina) ARG	Nicolás Abot	0	0	0	0	0	0
	MF	(Argentina) ARG	Benito Montalvo	0	0	0	0	0	0
	MF	(Croatia) CRO	Robert Alviž	0	0	0	0	0	0
	DF	(Indonesia) IDN	Nurmufid Fastabiqul Khoirot	0	0	0	0	0	0
	FW	(Indonesia) IDN	Agung Supriyanto	0	0	0	0	0	0
	FW	(Indonesia) IDN	Feri Ariawan	0	0	0	0	0	0

=== Clean sheets ===
As of 9 April 2015.

Rnk	Pos	No.	Player	Indonesia Super League	Piala Indonesia	Total
1	GK	12	(Indonesia) Yandri Pitoy	1	0	1
Total				1	0	1

=== Disciplinary record ===
As of 9 April 2015.

Rnk	Pos.	No.	Player	ISL			Piala Indonesia			Total		
Rnk	Pos.	No.	Player	Yellow card	(yellow card) (yellow-red card)	Red card	Yellow card	(yellow card) (yellow-red card)	Red card	Yellow card	(yellow card) (yellow-red card)	Red card
1	DF	46	(Indonesia) Firly Apriansyah	2	0	0	0	0	0	2	0	0
2	FW	10	(Indonesia) Rudi Widodo	1	0	0	0	0	0	1	0	0
2	MF	16	(Indonesia) Zulfiandi (Note: In match against Mitra Kukar, ligaindonesia.co.id said Fandi Utomo but actually was Zulfiandi)	1	0	0	0	0	0	1	0	0
Total				4	0	0	0	0	0	4	0	0

== Transfers ==
=== In ===
No.	Pos.	Name	Moving from	Type	Sources
	MF	(Indonesia) Evan Dimas	Free agent		
	DF	(Brazil) Otávio Dutra	Gresik United		
	MF	(Indonesia) Bima Ragil	Persekap Pasuruan		
	MF	(Indonesia) Siswanto	Sriwijaya		
	MF	(Indonesia) Wage Dwi Aryo	PS Mojokerto Putra		
	GK	(Indonesia) Hery Prasetyo	Gresik United		
	DF	(Indonesia) Dany Saputra	Persija Jakarta		
	DF	(Indonesia) Munhar	Arema Cronus		
	MF	(Indonesia) Asep Berlian	Persik Kediri		
	DF	(Indonesia) Mochammad Zaenuri	PON Jatim		
	MF	(Indonesia) Slamet Nurcahyono	Persepam Madura United		
	DF	(Indonesia) Heri Setiawan	Free agent		
	MF	(Indonesia) Reza Mustofa	Gresik United		
	MF	(Indonesia) Muhammad Fauzan Jamal	Persijap Jepara		
	FW	(Indonesia) Agung Supriyanto	Persija Jakarta		

=== Out ===
No.	Pos.	Name	Moving to	Type	Sources
	DF	(Indonesia) Alfin Ismail Tuasalamony	Persija Jakarta	Released	
	DF	(Indonesia) Vava Mario Yagalo	Persija Jakarta	Released	
	MF	(Indonesia) Muhammad Ilham	Persija Jakarta	Released	
	MF	(Indonesia) Novri Setiawan	Persija Jakarta	Released	
	FW	(Indonesia) Greg Nwokolo	Persija Jakarta	Released	
	MF	(Indonesia) Dedi Kusnandar	Persib Bandung	Released	
	DF	(Indonesia) Hasyim Kipuw	Arema Cronus	Released	
	MF	(Indonesia) Manahati Lestusen	Barito Putera	Released	
	FW	(Cameroon) Emmanuel Kenmogne	(Malaysia) Kelantan FA	Released	
	MF	(Liberia) Isaac Pupo	(Malaysia) Kelantan FA	Released	
	DF	(Indonesia) Ambrizal	Persija Jakarta	Released	
	DF	(Nigeria) Onorionde Kughegbe	(Malaysia) PDRM FA	Released	

== Notes ==
- 1.Persebaya United's (Bhayangkara FC) goals first.
