= 2019 Piala Indonesia Finals =

- Event: 2018–19 Piala Indonesia
Persija	PSM
1	2
- on aggregate

First leg
Persija	PSM
1	0
- Date: 21 July 2019
- Venue: Gelora Bung Karno, Jakarta
- Referee: Dwi Purba
- Attendance: 70,306

Second leg
PSM	Persija
2	0
- Date: 6 August 2019 (Note: The PSM v Persija match, originally scheduled on 28 July 2019, 15:30 UTC+7, was postponed to 8 August 2019 due to an attack on the Persija team bus when several players and officials were injured.)
- Venue: Andi Mattalata, Makassar
- Referee: Fariq Hitaba
- Attendance: 14,997

The 2019 Piala Indonesia Finals was the two-legged final that decided the winner of the 2018–19 Piala Indonesia, the seventh season of Indonesia's main football cup.

Unlike all the previous editions, it was a two-legged match home-and-away format.

The finals was contested between Persija and PSM. The draw to determine which team would be hosting the first and second leg was held on 9 July 2019. The first leg was hosted by Persija at Gelora Bung Karno in Jakarta on 21 July, while the second leg was hosted by PSM at Andi Mattalata in Makassar on 6 August 2019. The second leg was originally to be held on 28 July 2019. However, due to safety concerns resulting from the attack on the bus of Persija prior to the match, the date of second leg was moved.

PSM won the finals 2–1 on aggregate for their first ever Piala Indonesia title.

== Teams ==
Team	Previous finals appearances (bold indicates winners)
Persija	1 (2005)
PSM	None

== Road to the final ==
Note: In all results below, the score of the finalist is given first (H: home; A: away).

Persija				Round	PSM			
Opponent	Result			**First stage**	Opponent	Result		
Persikabo	2–0 (A)			First round	Sidrap United	w/o		
Bogor	1–0 (A)			Second round	Persiter	3–3 (3–2 p) (A)		
Opponent	Agg.	1st leg	2nd leg	**Second stage**	Opponent	Agg.	1st leg	2nd leg
757 Kepri Jaya	9–3	8–2 (H)	1–1 (A)	Round of 32	Kalteng Putra	3–1	2–1 (A)	1–0 (H)
TIRA-Persikabo	4–2	2–2 (A)	2–0 (H)	Round of 16	Perseru	12–0	9–0 (H)	3–0 (A)
Opponent	Agg.	1st leg	2nd leg	**Final stage**	Opponent	Agg.	1st leg	2nd leg
Bali United	2–2 (a)	1–2 (A)	1–0 (H)	Quarter-finals	Bhayangkara	4–4 (a)	2–4 (A)	2–0 (H)
Borneo	3–2	2–1 (H)	1–1 (A)	Semi-finals	Madura United	2–2 (a)	1–0 (H)	1–2 (A)

== Format ==
The final was played on a home-and-away two-legged basis. The away goals rule would be applied, and extra time would be played if the aggregate score was tied after the second leg and away goals rule. If the aggregate score was still tied after extra time, a penalty shoot-out would be used to determine the winner.

== Matches ==
All times are local, WIB (UTC+7).

=== First leg ===
21 July 2019
15:30

Persija	1–0	PSM
Ryuji 87'	Report

Gelora Bung Karno Stadium, Jakarta
Attendance: 70,306
Referee: Dwi Purba

**Persija**	**PSM**

GK	88	(Indonesia) Shahar Ginanjar
RB	14	(Indonesia) Ismed Sofyan (c)	(yellow card) 51'
CB	16	(Indonesia) Tony Sucipto
CB	6	(Indonesia) Maman Abdurrahman		(substituted off) 81'
LB	28	(Indonesia) Rezaldi Hehanusa		(substituted off) 46'
CM	10	(Brazil) Bruno Matos		(substituted off) 83'
CM	45	(Indonesia) Sandi Sute
CM	32	(Nepal) Rohit Chand
RW	25	(Indonesia) Riko Simanjuntak
LW	11	(Indonesia) Novri Setiawan
CF	9	(Croatia) Marko Šimić
Substitutes:
GK	29	(Indonesia) Adixi Lenzivio
DF	4	(Indonesia) Ryuji Utomo		(substituted on) 81'
MF	8	(Indonesia) Yan Nasadit
MF	41	(Indonesia) Feby Eka Putra
FW	20	(Indonesia) Bambang Pamungkas		(substituted on) 83'
FW	77	(Indonesia) Yogi Rahadian
FW	94	(Indonesia) Heri Susanto	(yellow card) 82'	(substituted on) 46'
Head Coach:
(Spain) Julio Bañuelos

Starting XI

GK	97	(Indonesia) Hilman Syah
RB	14	(Indonesia) Asnawi Bahar
CB	4	(Australia) Aaron Evans
CB	28	(Indonesia) Abdul Rahman
LB	32	(Indonesia) Beny Wahyudi
DM	17	(Indonesia) Rasyid Bakri	(yellow card) 35'
CM	10	(Netherlands) Marc Klok (c)	(yellow card) 27'
CM	19	(Indonesia) Rizky Pellu
RW	7	(Indonesia) Zulham Zamrun		(substituted off) 77'
LW	11	(Indonesia) Muhammad Rachmat		(substituted off) 88'
CF	39	(Indonesia) Guy Junior
Substitutes:
GK	77	(Indonesia) Hery Prasetyo
DF	16	(Indonesia) Munhar
DF	26	(Indonesia) Taufik Hidayat
MF	18	(Indonesia) Muhammad Arfan		(substituted on) 88'
MF	23	(Indonesia) Bayu Gatra
FW	6	(Indonesia) Ferdinand Sinaga
FW	9	(Finland) Eero Markkanen		(substituted on) 77'
Head Coach:
(Bosnia and Herzegovina) Darije Kalezić

Assistant referees:
Aziz Alimmudin
I Gede Slamet Raharjo
Fourth official:
Oki Dwi Putra

**Match rules**

- 90 minutes.
- Seven named substitutes, of which up to three may be used.

=== Second leg ===
6 August 2019
15:30

PSM	2–0	Persija
Evans 3'; Zulham 49'	Report

Andi Mattalata Stadium, Makassar
Attendance: 14,997
Referee: Fariq Hitaba

**PSM**	**Persija**

GK	20	(Indonesia) Rivky Mokodompit	(yellow card) 90+2'
RB	14	(Indonesia) Asnawi Bahar	(yellow card) 26'	(substituted off) 90+6'
CB	4	(Australia) Aaron Evans	(yellow card) 43'
CB	28	(Indonesia) Abdul Rahman	(yellow card) 28'
LB	32	(Indonesia) Beny Wahyudi
CM	19	(Indonesia) Rizky Pellu
CM	18	(Indonesia) Muhammad Arfan	(yellow card) 11'	(substituted off) 90+2'
AM	80	(Netherlands) Wiljan Pluim (c)	(yellow card) 90'
RW	39	(Indonesia) Guy Junior		(substituted off) 20'
LW	11	(Indonesia) Muhammad Rachmat	(yellow card) 22'
CF	6	(Indonesia) Ferdinand Sinaga
Substitutes:
GK	97	(Indonesia) Hilman Syah
DF	16	(Indonesia) Munhar
DF	26	(Indonesia) Taufik Hidayat		(substituted on) 90+6'
MF	17	(Indonesia) Rasyid Bakri		(substituted on) 90+2'
MF	23	(Indonesia) Bayu Gatra
FW	7	(Indonesia) Zulham Zamrun	(yellow card) 90+5'	(substituted on) 20'
FW	9	(Finland) Eero Markkanen
Head Coach:
(Bosnia and Herzegovina) Darije Kalezić

Starting XI

GK	26	(Indonesia) Andritany Ardhiyasa (c)
RB	14	(Indonesia) Ismed Sofyan
CB	16	(Indonesia) Tony Sucipto		(substituted off) 59'
CB	4	(Indonesia) Ryuji Utomo	(yellow card) 7'
LB	28	(Indonesia) Rezaldi Hehanusa	(yellow card) 67'
CM	45	(Indonesia) Sandi Sute	(yellow card) 19' (yellow-red card) 32'
CM	32	(Nepal) Rohit Chand
AM	10	(Brazil) Bruno Matos		(substituted off) 20'
RW	25	(Indonesia) Riko Simanjuntak		(substituted off) 64'
LW	11	(Indonesia) Novri Setiawan
CF	9	(Croatia) Marko Šimić
Substitutes:
GK	29	(Indonesia) Adixi Lenzivio
DF	3	(Indonesia) Dany Saputra
DF	6	(Indonesia) Maman Abdurrahman	(yellow card) 74'	(substituted on) 36'
MF	7	(Indonesia) Ramdani Lestaluhu		(substituted on) 59'
MF	8	(Indonesia) Yan Nasadit
FW	20	(Indonesia) Bambang Pamungkas		(substituted on) 64'
FW	77	(Indonesia) Yogi Rahadian
Head Coach:
(Spain) Julio Bañuelos

Assistant referees:
Denny Somantri
Fajar Furqon
Fourth official:
Yeni Krisdianto

**Match rules**

- 90 minutes.
- 30 minutes of extra time if tied on aggregate and away goals rule.
- Penalty shoot-out if still tied after extra time.
- Seven named substitutes, of which up to three may be used.
