= Mustofa =

Mustofa is a given name and surname, an equivalent of Mustafa. Notable people with the name include:

- Ihsan Maulana Mustofa (born 1995), Indonesian badminton player
- Mustofa Bisri, Indonesian Muslim cleric
- Reza Mustofa, Indonesian footballer
