= 2025–26 Liga 4 Southwest Papua =

Liga 4 Southwest Papua
- Season: 2025–26
- Dates: 22 March – 6 April 2026
- Champions: Persikos
- Runner up: Persemay
- National phase: Persikos; Persemay
- Matches: 20
- Goals: 63 (3.15 per match)
- Longest winning run: Persemay (5)
- Longest unbeaten run: Persemay (5)
- Longest winless run: Persisos (4)
- Longest losing run: Persisos (3); PS Getsemani (3)

2025–26 Liga 4 Southwest Papua (also known as the 2025–26 Southwest Papua Governor's Cup for sponsorship reasons) is the second season of the fourth-tier football competition in Indonesia organized by the Provincial Association (Asprov) of PSSI Southwest Papua. The competition serves as the provincial qualifying round for the national phase of the 2025–26 Liga 4.

== Background ==
In early 2026, Asprov PSSI Southwest Papua finalized preparations for the provincial league under the branding of the Governor's Cup. Acting general secretary, Dave Thio, stated that the competition is a crucial step for local football development across the Greater Sorong and Raja Ampat regions.

To ensure the success of the tournament, the organizing committee, led by Amatus Turot, held a strategic coordination meeting with the Acting Governor of Southwest Papua, Mohammad Musa’ad, at the Governor's office in March 2026. Turot emphasized that all sectors, from security to match officials, were undergoing final evaluations to meet PSSI standards ahead of the kick-off.

The registration period for official member clubs was scheduled from 2 to 14 March 2026.

== Format and schedule ==
The competition is scheduled to officially kick-off on 22 March 2026 at the Bawela Stadium in Sorong. The league is designed to accommodate clubs from across the province, ensuring competitive representation from regencies such as Sorong City, Sorong Regency, Maybrat Regency, South Sorong Regency, and Tambrauw Regency.

== Teams ==
The Chairman of the Organizing Committee for the Liga 4 Southwest Papua (Governor's Cup), Amatus Turot, officially inaugurated the nine teams set to compete in the 2025–26 season. According to the announcement by the committee, these clubs are scheduled to begin their matches on 22 March 2026. The competition features a mix of returning members, including the defending champions from the previous season, and newly confirmed participants representing various regencies across the province.

=== Location map ===
Locations of teams competing in the 2025–26 Liga 4 Southwest Papua.
Noted:
- Sorong City – Persikos, PS Putra Doom, Nogari Rekub Dum
- Sorong Regency – PS Getsemani, Persiss, PS Unimuda Sorong

=== Participating teams ===
The following clubs are officially confirmed to participate in the 2025–26 Liga 4 Southwest Papua.

No	Team	Location	Map	2024–25 season
1	Persikos	Sorong City		Champions
2	PS Putra Doom	Sorong City		Group stage
3	Nogari Rekub Dum	Sorong City		Did not participate
4	Persisos	South Sorong Regency		Runners-up
5	Persitam	Tambrauw Regency		Group stage
6	Persemay	Maybrat Regency		Did not participate
7	PS Getsemani	Sorong Regency		Did not participate
8	Persiss	Sorong Regency		Did not participate
9	PS Unimuda Sorong	Sorong Regency		Group stage

== Venue ==
Matches are primarily held at Bawela Stadium, Sorong City.

== Group stage ==
The group stage began on 22 March 2026 at the Bawela Stadium, Sorong City. Nine teams were divided into two groups, competing in a single round-robin format. The winner and runner-up from each group advanced to the knockout stage.

=== Group A ===
Pos	Team	Pld	W	D	L	GF	GA	GD	Pts	Qualification
1	Persemay	4	4	0	0	9	0	+9	12	Qualification to Knockout stage
2	Persikos	4	3	0	1	11	3	+8	9	Qualification to Knockout stage
3	PS Putra Doom	4	1	1	2	3	5	−2	4	
4	Nogari Rekub Dum	4	1	0	3	4	14	−10	3	
5	Persisos	4	0	1	3	2	7	−5	1	

Updated to match(es) played on 30 March 2026. Source: PSSI PBD
Rules for classification: 1) Points; 2) Head-to-head points; 3) Head-to-head goal difference; 4) Head-to-head goals scored; 5) Goal difference; 6) Goals scored; 7) Fair-play points; 8) Draw.

Matchday 1 (22 March 2026)

==== Matchday 1 ====
22 March 2026
15.00 (UTC+09:00)

PS Putra Doom	0–3	Persemay
	Report	45+1', 79' A. Wafom; 56' B. Sauyai

Bawela Stadium, Sorong City

Matchday 2 (24 March 2026)

==== Matchday 2 ====
24 March 2026
08.00 (UTC+09:00)

Nogari Rekub Dum	0–7	Persikos
	Report	14' A. Kadai; 20', 34' E. Sani; 43' F. Osok; 84' C. Hegemur; 87' H. Dam; 90+4' D. Malibela

Bawela Stadium, Sorong City
24 March 2026
15.00 (UTC+09:00)

Persisos	0–0	PS Putra Doom
	Report

Bawela Stadium, Sorong City

Matchday 3 (26 March 2026)

==== Matchday 3 ====
26 March 2026
08.00 (UTC+09:00)

Persisos	1–3	Nogari Rekub Dum
I. Warib 90+5'	Report	37' (pen.) S. Watora; 59' A. Kaburi; 89' S. Maniani

Bawela Stadium, Sorong City
26 March 2026
15.00 (UTC+09:00)

Persikos	0–2	Persemay
	Report	59' B. Sauyai; 90+1' M. Antoh

Bawela Stadium, Sorong City

Matchday 4 (28 March 2026)

==== Matchday 4 ====
28 March 2026
08.00 (UTC+09:00)

Persisos	1–3	Persikos
M. Beyete 66'	Report	20', 43', 90+2' F. Osok

Bawela Stadium, Sorong City
28 March 2026
15.00 (UTC+09:00)

Persemay	3–0	Nogari Rekub Dum
A. Wafom 14', 56'; R. Taribaba 75'	Report

Bawela Stadium, Sorong City

Matchday 5 (29 March 2026)

==== Matchday 5 ====
29 March 2026
15.00 (UTC+09:00)

Persikos	1–0	PS Putra Doom
C. Hegemur 26'	Report

Bawela Stadium, Sorong City

Matchday 6 (30 March 2026)

==== Matchday 6 ====
30 March 2026
08.00 (UTC+09:00)

Persemay	1–0	Persisos
R. Seum 76'	Report

Bawela Stadium, Sorong City
30 March 2026
15.00 (UTC+09:00)

PS Putra Doom	3–1	Nogari Rekub Dum
R. Kolis 29'; Y. Logo 57', 61'	Report	76' Ken

Bawela Stadium, Sorong City

=== Group B ===
Pos	Team	Pld	W	D	L	GF	GA	GD	Pts	Qualification
1	Persitam	3	3	0	0	7	2	+5	9	Qualification to Knockout stage
2	PS Unimuda Sorong	3	2	0	1	6	4	+2	6	Qualification to Knockout stage
3	Persiss	3	1	0	2	6	3	+3	3	
4	PS Getsemani	3	0	0	3	2	12	−10	0	

Updated to match(es) played on 27 March 2026. Source: PSSI PBD
Rules for classification: 1) Points; 2) Head-to-head points; 3) Head-to-head goal difference; 4) Head-to-head goals scored; 5) Goal difference; 6) Goals scored; 7) Fair-play points; 8) Draw.

Matchday 1 (23 March 2026)

==== Matchday 1 ====
23 March 2026
08.00 (UTC+09:00)

Persitam	4–1	PS Getsemani
	Report

Bawela Stadium, Sorong City
23 March 2026
15.00 (UTC+09:00)

Persiss	1–2	PS Unimuda Sorong
	Report

Bawela Stadium, Sorong City

Matchday 2 (25 March 2026)

==== Matchday 2 ====
25 March 2026
08.00 (UTC+09:00)

PS Getsemani	0–5	Persiss
	Report	16', 58', 80', 81' A. Solossa; 49' D. Salamala

Bawela Stadium, Sorong City
25 March 2026
15.00 (UTC+09:00)

PS Unimuda Sorong	1–2	Persitam
S. Doo 70'	Report	20' D. Maga; 44' S. Raunsay

Bawela Stadium, Sorong City

Matchday 3 (27 March 2026)

==== Matchday 3 ====
27 March 2026
08.00 (UTC+09:00)

Persiss	0–1	Persitam
	Report	90+4' E. Omkarsba

Bawela Stadium, Sorong City
27 March 2026
15.00 (UTC+09:00)

PS Getsemani	1–3	PS Unimuda Sorong
E. Bisay 58'	Report	5', 18' W. Mambrasar; 45+1' G. Pagara

Bawela Stadium, Sorong City

== Knockout stage ==
The knockout stage uses a single-match system. In the event of a draw during regulation time, the match proceeds to extra time and, if necessary, a penalty shoot-out to determine the winner. Four teams from the two groups of Liga 4 Southwest Papua officially qualified for the semi-finals stage.

=== Bracket ===
Semi-finals
1 April 2026 — Bawela, Sorong City
A1	Persemay	4
B2	PS Unimuda Sorong	0
2 April 2026 — Bawela, Sorong City
B1	Persitam	0
A2	Persikos	2

Final
6 April 2026 — Bawela, Sorong City
Persemay	1
Persikos	2
Third place play-off
5 April 2026 — Bawela, Sorong City
PS Unimuda Sorong	0
Persitam	4

=== Knockout match ===
Semi-finals (1–2 April 2026)

==== Semi-final 1 ====
1 April 2026
15:00 (UTC+09:00)

Persemay	4–0	PS Unimuda Sorong
A. Wafom 28' (pen.), 45', 48'; H. Kocu 86'	Report

Bawela Stadium, Sorong City

==== Semi-final 2 ====
2 April 2026
15:00 (UTC+09:00)

Persitam	0–2	Persikos
	Report	74' F. Osok; 88' H. Daam

Bawela Stadium, Sorong City

3rd place and Final (5–6 April 2026)

==== Third place play-off ====
5 April 2026
15:00 (UTC+09:00)

PS Unimuda Sorong	0–4	Persitam
	Report	58' S. Kareth; 74' R. Mirino; 87' A. Solossa; 89' (pen.) A. Almufakir

Bawela Stadium, Sorong City

==== Final ====
6 April 2026
15:00 (UTC+09:00)

Persemay	1–2	Persikos
	Report

Bawela Stadium, Sorong City

== Top scorers ==
As of 26 March 2026

Rank	Player	Club	Goals
1	Alberto Solossa	Persiss Sorong	4
1	Fredi Osok	Persikos Sorong	4
1	Anderson Wafom	Persemay Maybrat	4
2	Engelbert Sani	Persikos Sorong	2
2	Bertho Sauyai	Persemay Maybrat	2

== Awards ==
Team
Champion	Persikos Sorong
Runner-up	Persemay Maybrat
Third-place	Persitam Tambrauw
Individual
Top scorer	Anderson Wafom (Persemay)
Best player	Calvin Hegemur (Persikos)
Best young player	Ellia Solossa (Persemay)
Best goalkeeper	Samuel Raunsai (Persikos)
Source: Provincial Association (Asprov) of PSSI Southwest Papua

== See also ==
- 2025–26 Liga 4
- 2025–26 Liga 4 Central Papua
- 2025–26 Liga 4 Highland Papua
- 2025–26 Liga 4 South Papua
- 2025–26 Liga 4 West Papua
- 2025–26 Liga 4 Papua
