= Irsan Lestaluhu =

Indonesian association footballer

Personal information
- Full name: Irsan Rahman Lestaluhu
- Date of birth: 4 August 1999 (age 27)
- Place of birth: Ambon, Indonesia
- Height: 1.75 m (5 ft 9 in)
- Position: Left-back

Youth career
- PPLP Kabupaten Bogor

Senior career*
Years	Team	Apps	(Gls)
2016–2017	Persikabo Bogor	3	(0)
2018	Madura United	1	(0)
2019	→ PSS Sleman (loan)	0	(0)
2019–2020	Persiba Balikpapan	10	(2)
2021–2023	Borneo	13	(0)
2021–2022	→ Persipura Jayapura (loan)	12	(0)
2023–2025	Malut United	14	(0)
2025	PSPS Pekanbaru	10	(0)

International career
2017	Indonesia U19	3	(0)
2021	Indonesia U23	1	(0)
Medal record
Men's football
Representing Indonesia
AFF U-19 Youth Championship
Third place	2017 Myanmar
- * Club domestic league appearances and goals as of 23:15, 27 December 2025 (UTC)

Irsan Rahman Lestaluhu (born 4 August 1999) is an Indonesian professional footballer who plays as a left-back.

== Club career ==
=== Madura United ===
In January 2018, Irsan signed a one-year contract with Madura United on a free transfer, when appearing for the first time with the team in a friendly match some time ago, Irsan has shown his brilliant ability. Irsan made his league debut in a 2–0 away lose against Badak Lampung on 1 December 2018 as a substitute for Andik Rendika Rama in the 82nd minute.

==== Loan to PSS Sleman ====
On 13 February 2019, Irsan joined PSS Sleman along with Rifad Marasabessy on loan from Madura United for the 2019 season.

=== Persiba Balikpapan ===
He was signed for Persiba Balikpapan to play in Liga 2 in the 2019 season. Irsan made his league debut on 27 August 2019 in an away win 0–1 against Persis Solo. Irsan scored his first league goal from a free-kick in first-half, against Sulut United on 6 September 2019. On 28 September 2019, Irsan scored again from free-kick in a 3–1 home win against PSBS Biak Numfor. Persiba's management revealed that Irsan would not renew his contract with the club at the end of December and officially left the club.

=== Borneo ===
On 19 March 2021, Irsan moved to Samarinda and joined Liga 1 side Borneo on free transfer. Irsan made his club debut in a pre-season 2021 Menpora Cup against PSM Makassar on 31 March 2021.

==== Loan to Persipura Jayapura ====
In June 2021, Irsan joined Persipura Jayapura on loan from Borneo for the 2021–22 season. Irsan made his league debut on 10 September 2021 in a match against Persela Lamongan.

=== RANS Nusantara ===
Ahead of the 2023–24 season, Irsan signed a year contract with RANS Nusantara.

== International career ==
On 6 June 2017, Irsan made his debut against Scotland U20 in the 2017 Toulon Tournament in France. And Irsan is one of the players that strengthen Indonesia U19 in 2017 AFF U-18 Youth Championship.

In October 2021, Irsan was called up to the Indonesia U23 in a friendly match against Tajikistan and Nepal and also prepared for 2022 AFC U-23 Asian Cup qualification in Tajikistan by Shin Tae-yong. On 22 October 2021, Irsan debuted in the under-23 team when he coming as a starter in a 2–0 win against Nepal U23.

== Career statistics ==
=== Club ===
As of 27 December 2025

Club	Season	League			Cup		Continental		Other		Total	
Club	Season	Division	Apps	Goals	Apps	Goals	Apps	Goals	Apps	Goals	Apps	Goals
Persikabo Bogor	2016	ISC B	3	0	0	0	–		0	0	3	0
Madura United	2018	Liga 1	1	0	0	0	–		0	0	1	0
PSS Sleman	2019	Liga 1	0	0	0	0	–		0	0	0	0
Persiba Balikpapan	2019	Liga 2	9	2	0	0	–		0	0	9	2
Persiba Balikpapan	2020	Liga 2	1	0	0	0	–		0	0	1	0
Persiba Balikpapan	Total		10	2	0	0	–		0	0	10	2
Borneo	2021–22	Liga 1	0	0	0	0	–		1 (Note: Appearances in Menpora Cup)	0	1	0
Borneo	2022–23	Liga 1	13	0	0	0	–		1 (Note: Appearances in Indonesia President's Cup)	0	13	0
Borneo	Total		13	0	0	0	–		1	0	14	0
Persipura Jayapura (loan)	2021–22	Liga 1	12	0	0	0	–		0	0	12	0
Maluku Utara United	2023–24	Liga 2	13	0	0	0	–		0	0	13	0
Maluku Utara United	2024–25	Liga 1	1	0	0	0	–		0	0	1	0
Maluku Utara United	Total		14	0	0	0	–		0	0	14	0
PSPS Pekanbaru	2025–26	Championship	9	0	0	0	–		0	0	9	0
Career total			62	2	0	0	0	0	2	0	64	2

== Honours ==
=== Club ===
Borneo Samarinda

- Indonesia President's Cup runner-up: 2022

Malut United

- Liga 2 third place (play-offs): 2023–24

=== International ===
Indonesia U-19

- AFF U-19 Youth Championship third place: 2017
