= Saldi (disambiguation) =

Saldi may refer to:

== Places ==
- Saldi, a village in the Mehsana District, Gujarat, India

== People ==
- Jay Saldi, American footballer

== Other ==
- Surface-assisted laser desorption/ionization
