= Arifin =

Arifin is a surname. Notable people with the surname include:

- Samsul Arifin (born 1992), Indonesian professional footballer
- Siti Mirza Nuria Arifin (born 1953) known professionally as Dr. Siti Mirza, Indonesian doctor, businesswoman, singer, and model beauty pageant titleholder
- Syamsul Arifin (1952–2023), Indonesian politician
- Zainul Arifin (1909–1963), Indonesian politician
