= Thomas Ryan Bayu =

Indonesian professional footballer

Personal information
- Full name: Thomas Ryan Bayu Hermawan
- Date of birth: 27 July 1991 (age 35)
- Place of birth: Banjarnegara, Indonesia
- Height: 1.87 m (6 ft 2 in)
- Position: Goalkeeper

Youth career
- 2010: Persela U-21

Senior career*
Years	Team	Apps	(Gls)
2011–2015	Bhayangkara F.C.	18	(0)
2016	Bhayangkara	0	(0)
2017–2019	Mitra Kukar	0	(0)

International career^{‡}
2013	Indonesia U-23	1	(0)
- * Club domestic league appearances and goals as of 30 April 2016 (UTC) ‡ National team caps and goals as of 18 November 2014 (UTC)

Thomas Ryan Bayu Hermawan (born 27 July 1991) is an Indonesian professional footballer

== Club career ==
=== Surabaya United ===
Surabaya United recruited Thomas from Persela U-21 in 2010/2011 season. On 5 February 2012, Thomas made his competitive debut for Persebaya in the 2011–12 Liga Indonesia Premier Division against Persitara North Jakarta, which ended in a 2–0 victory at Gelora 10 November Stadium. A year later, Surabaya United became champions of 2013 Liga Indonesia Premier Division and promoted to Indonesia Super League.

== Club statistics ==
As of 30 April 2016.

Club statistics
Club	Season	League			Piala Indonesia		Asian		Other		Total	
Club	Season	Division	Apps	Goals	Apps	Goals	Apps	Goals	Apps	Goals	Apps	Goals
Persebaya Surabaya	2011–12	Premier Division	11	0	—						11	0
Persebaya Surabaya	2013	Premier Division	7	0	—						7	0
Persebaya Surabaya	2014	Indonesia Super League	0	0	—						0	0
Persebaya Surabaya	2015	Indonesia Super League	0	0	—						0	0
Persebaya Surabaya	2016	Indonesia Soccer Championship	0	0	—						0	0
Career total			18	0	0	0	0	0	0	0	18	0

== Honours ==
=== Club ===
Persebaya Surabaya

- Liga Indonesia Premier Division: 2013
