= Ronaldo Meosido =

Indonesian footballer

Personal information
- Full name: Ronaldo Meosido
- Date of birth: 30 June 1992 (age 34)
- Place of birth: Manokwari, Indonesia
- Height: 1.74 m (5 ft 9 in)
- Position: Midfielder

Senior career*
Years	Team	Apps	(Gls)
2012–2014	Persita Tangerang	20	(0)
2014–2019	Perseru Serui	90	(2)
2019	Persipura Jayapura	16	(0)
2020	Semen Padang	0	(0)
2021	Sriwijaya	3	(0)
- * Club domestic league appearances and goals as of 30 November 2021

Ronaldo Meosido (born 30 June 1992) is an Indonesian professional footballer who plays as a midfielder.

== Club career ==
=== Perseru Serui ===
Ronaldo made his debut when against Mitra Kukar in the First week 2016 Indonesia Soccer Championship A. His first goal when he scored against Persiba Balikpapan, at that time, he scored from a free kick.

=== Persipura Jayapura ===
He was signed for Persipura Jayapura to play in Liga 1 in the 2019 season. Meosido made his debut on 18 May 2019 in a match against Persib Bandung at the Si Jalak Harupat Stadium, Soreang.

=== Sriwijaya ===
In 2021, Meosido signed a contract with Indonesian Liga 2 club Sriwijaya. He made his league debut on 21 October against KS Tiga Naga at the Gelora Sriwijaya Stadium, Palembang.
