= Lucky Wahyu =

Indonesian association footballer

Personal information
- Full name: Lucky Wahyu Dwi Permana
- Date of birth: 1 April 1990 (age 36)
- Place of birth: Sidoarjo, Indonesia
- Height: 1.78 m (5 ft 10 in)
- Position: Defensive midfielder

Team information
- Current team: Persida Sidoarjo
- Number: 13

Youth career
- SSB Kelud Putra
- SSB Cahaya Muda
- Persebaya Surabaya

Senior career*
Years	Team	Apps	(Gls)
2007–2012	Persebaya Surabaya	65	(5)
2011–2012	→ Persija Jakarta (IPL) (loan)	10	(0)
2013–2016	PS Barito Putera	55	(0)
2017	Sragen United	13	(0)
2018	Madura United	6	(0)
2019	Persela Lamongan	27	(1)
2020	Sulut United	1	(0)
2021	Persela Lamongan	0	(0)
2022	Bekasi City	2	(0)
2023–2024	PS Mojokerto Putra	10	(0)
2025–	Persida Sidoarjo	4	(1)

International career
2003	Indonesia U14		
2005	Indonesia U17		
2007	Indonesia U19	4	(2)
2008	Indonesia U21	3	(0)
2009	Indonesia U23	2	(0)
- * Club domestic league appearances and goals as of 23 January 2025

Lucky Wahyu Dwi Permana (born 1 April 1990) is an Indonesian professional footballer who plays as a defensive midfielder for Liga 4 club Persida Sidoarjo.

== Club career ==
=== Sulut United ===
He was signed for Sulut United to play in Liga 2 in the 2020 season. This season was suspended on 27 March 2020 due to the COVID-19 pandemic. The season was abandoned and was declared void on 20 January 2021.

=== Sriwijaya ===
In 2021, Lucky Wahyu signed a contract with Indonesian Liga 2 club Sriwijaya.

== International career ==
In 2009, Lucky Wahyu represented the Indonesia U-23, in the 2009 Southeast Asian Games.
