= Beto (footballer, born 1987) =

Brazilian footballer

Personal information
- Full name: Alberto Antônio de Paula
- Date of birth: 31 May 1987 (age 39)
- Place of birth: Guarulhos, Brazil
- Height: 1.88 m (6 ft 2 in)
- Position: Striker

Youth career
- 2002–2006: Palmeiras

Senior career*
Years	Team	Apps	(Gls)
2006–2008	Palmeiras	0	(0)
2006–2008	Palmeiras B		
2006	→ Ituano (loan)	5	(0)
2007	→ CA Juventus (loan)		
2007	→ Ponte Preta (loan)	10	(0)
2008	→ Ituano (loan)		
2008	→ América (loan)		
2008	→ Bragantino (loan)	4	(1)
2009	Wisła Kraków	6	(0)
2009	Bragantino	10	(0)
2010	Nanchang Bayi	29	(7)
2011	Shenzhen Phoenix	5	(0)
2012	Penapolense	21	(6)
2013	Hermann Aichinger	11	(4)
2013	Avaí	23	(3)
2014–2015	ABC	14	(4)
2015	Novorizontino	13	(3)
2015	Botafogo-PB	10	(1)
2016	Penapolense	16	(0)
2017	Al Ansar	7	(1)
2017	Al-Jahra		
2018	Madura United	17	(4)
2018	→ Perseru Serui (loan)	15	(9)
2019	Noroeste	0	(0)
2020	Vitória-ES	0	(0)

International career
2005	Brazil U18	3	(2)
2006	Brazil U20	3	(0)
- * Club domestic league appearances and goals

Alberto Antônio de Paula (born 31 May 1987), or simply Beto, is a Brazilian former professional footballer who played as a striker.

== Club career ==
Beto was chosen the best young player of the year by the Paulista Soccer Association in 2005.

On 17 December 2009, he transferred to Nanchang Bayi. Beto made his China Super League debut on 27 March 2010, in a 0–2 away loss to Beijing Guoan. He scored his goal for Nanchang on his fourth appearance, in a 3–2 home win over Hangzhou Greentown on 17 April.

On 23 March 2011, Beto signed a three-month contract with China League One club Shenzhen Phoenix. He made only 7 appearances for Shenzhen and scored a goal on 4 May in a FA Cup match which Shenzhen beat Shenyang Dongjin 3–0 at home. He left the club after his contract was expired in June 2011.

In 2012, Beto joined Brazilian outfit Penapolense.

On 4 January 2017, Beto signed for Lebanese Premier League club Ansar; he scored one goal, against Nejmeh in the Beirut derby, in seven games.

In 2018 he signed for Deportivo Municipal. He is known as "Betinho" or "Beto" to fans.

== International career ==
Beto has been capped at Under-18 and Under-20 level for Brazil.

== Honours ==
=== Wisła Kraków ===
- Ekstraklasa: 2008–09

=== International ===
- Copa Sendai: 2005

=== Individual ===
- Best young player of the year by A.P.F.: 2005

== Statistics ==
Club	Season	League	Domestic League		State league		Domestic Cups		State Cup		Continental Cups		Total	
Club	Season	League	Apps	Goals	Apps	Goals	Apps	Goals	Apps	Goals	Apps	Goals	Apps	Goals
Palmeiras B	2006	Série A2	–		15	36	–		7	15	–		22	28
Ituano (loan)	2006	Série B	5	20	–		–				–		5	16
Palmeiras	2007	Série A1	–		2	8	–		–		–		2	8
CA Juventus (loan)	2007	Série A1	–		3	20	–		–		–		3	24
Ponte Preta (loan)	2007	Série B	10	38	–		–		–		–		10	22
Ituano (loan)	2008	Série A1	–		3	9	–		–		–		3	14
América (loan)	2008	Série A2	–		4	14	–		–		–		4	14
Palmeiras B	2008	Série A3	–		6	12	–		–		–		6	12
Bragantino (loan)	2008	Série B	4	12	–		–		5	12	–		9	12
Wisła Kraków	2008–2009	Ekstraklasa	6	10	–		2	10	–		–		8	10
Bragantino	2009	Série B	10	20	–		–		–		–		10	20
Nanchang Bayi	2010	Chinese Super League	29	27	–		–		–		–		29	27
Shenzhen Phoenix	2011	China League One	5	10	–		2	1	–		–		7	1
Penapolense	2012	Série A2	–		21	36	–		–		–		21	36
Hermann Aichinger	2013	Catarinense	–		11	24	–		–		–		11	24
Brazil			29	31	65	27	–		7	5	–		101	33
Poland			6	10	–		2	0	–		–		8	0
China			34	17	–		2	1	–		–		36	8
Total			69	8	65	27	4	1	12	6	–		145	341
