= Persikos Sorong =

Indonesian football club

Persikos
- Full name: Persatuan Sepakbola Indonesia Kota Sorong
- Nicknames: Kasuari Biru Muda; Tim Bendar Minik
- Founded: 1970; 56 years ago
- Ground: Bawela Stadium; Sorong, Southwest Papua
- Capacity: 7,000
- Owner: Sorong City Government
- League: Liga 4
- 2024–25: 1st (Southwest Papua zone); First round, 4th in Group D (National phase)
Home colours	Away colours

Persatuan Sepakbola Indonesia Kota Sorong, simply known as Persikos, is an Indonesian football club based in Sorong, Southwest Papua. They currently compete in the Liga 4 Southwest Papua zone.

They are true rivals of local clubs in the Greater Sorong, especially with Persiss Sorong, and then since 2003, have been in a rivalry with Persisos South Sorong.

== Honours ==
- Liga 4 Southwest Papua
  - Champions (2): 2024–25, 2025–26
