= Tanjung Sugiarto =

Indonesian association footballer

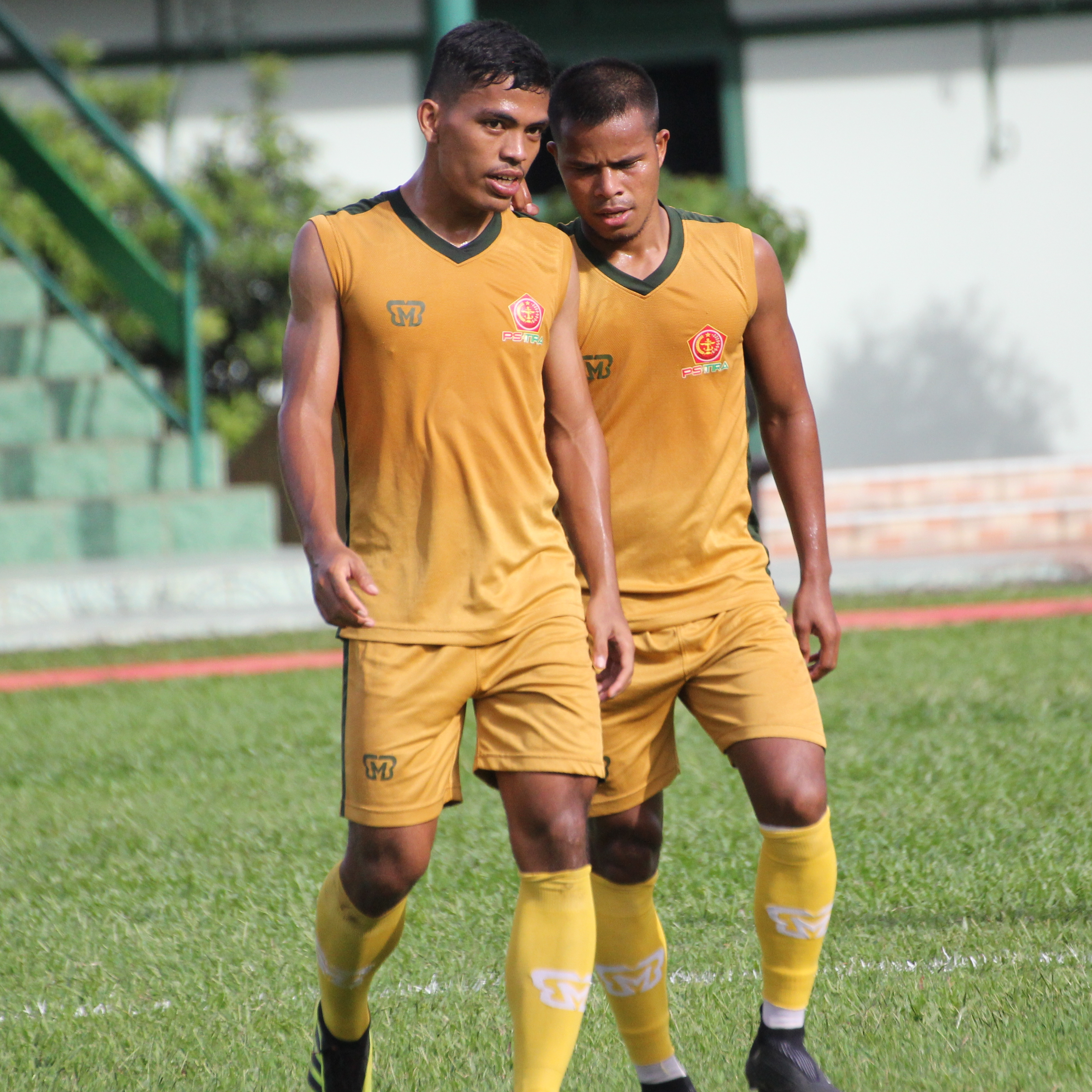
- Tanjung & Lestusen with TIRA-Persikabo in 2019

Personal information
- Full name: Tanjung Sugiarto
- Date of birth: 11 May 1999 (age 27)
- Place of birth: Bogor, Indonesia
- Height: 1.68 m (5 ft 6 in)
- Position: Midfielder

Youth career
- SSJ Bogor
- Jakarta Football Academy
- ASIOP Apacinti
- Madura United

Senior career*
Years	Team	Apps	(Gls)
2017–2018	Madura United	4	(0)
2019	TIRA-Persikabo	1	(0)
2020	Mitra Kukar	0	(0)
2021	Muba Babel United	3	(0)
- * Club domestic league appearances and goals as of 22 November 2021

Tanjung Sugiarto (born 11 May 1999) is an Indonesian professional footballer who plays as a midfielder. He is the younger brother of Asep Berlian.

== Club career ==
=== Madura United ===
In 2017, Sugiarto signed a year contract with Indonesian Liga 1 club Madura United. He made his professional debut on 4 May 2017 in a match against Persija Jakarta at the Patriot Candrabaga Stadium, Bekasi.

=== TIRA-Persikabo ===
He was signed for TIRA-Persikabo to play in Liga 1 in the 2019 season. Sugiarto made his debut on 2 August 2019 in a match against PSIS Semarang at the Moch. Soebroto Stadium, Magelang.

=== Mitra Kukar ===
He was signed for Mitra Kukar to play in Liga 2 in the 2020 season. This season was suspended on 27 March 2020 due to the COVID-19 pandemic. The season was abandoned and was declared void on 20 January 2021.

=== Muba Babel United ===
In 2021, Tanjung signed a contract with Indonesian Liga 2 club Muba Babel United. He made his league debut on 6 October against Sriwijaya at the Gelora Sriwijaya Stadium, Palembang.

== Career statistics ==
=== Club ===
As of match played 22 November 2021

Club	Season	League			Cup (Note: Includes Piala Indonesia.)		Continental		Total	
Club	Season	Division	Apps	Goals	Apps	Goals	Apps	Goals	Apps	Goals
Madura United	2017	Liga 1	4	0	0	0	0	0	4	0
Madura United	2018	Liga 1	0	0	0	0	0	0	0	0
Madura United	Total		4	0	0	0	0	0	4	0
TIRA-Persikabo	2019	Liga 1	1	0	0	0	0	0	1	0
Mitra Kukar	2020–21	Liga 2	0	0	0	0	0	0	0	0
Muba Babel United	2021	Liga 2	3	0	0	0	0	0	3	0
Career total			8	0	0	0	0	0	8	0
