= Ravi Murdianto =

Indonesian footballer

Personal information
- Full name: Ravi Murdianto
- Date of birth: 8 January 1995 (age 31)
- Place of birth: Grobogan, Indonesia
- Height: 1.81 m (5 ft 11 in)
- Position: Goalkeeper

Youth career
- 2011–2012: SSB Putra Bersemi Grobogan
- 2012–2013: Diklat Ragunan

Senior career*
Years	Team	Apps	(Gls)
2013	Perserang Serang	7	(0)
2014–2015	Mitra Kukar	0	(0)
2016–2018	PS TIRA	11	(0)
2017	→ Mitra Kukar (loan)	3	(0)
2018	Madura United	0	(0)
2019	PSCS Cilacap	11	(0)
2020	Persikabo 1973	0	(0)
2021	Persela Lamongan	4	(0)
2022–2023	Persikab Bandung	3	(0)
2023–2024	Persipura Jayapura	0	(0)
2025	Persitema Temanggung	10	(0)

International career
2012	Indonesia U16	6	(0)
2013–2014	Indonesia U19	24	(0)
2015	Indonesia U23	1	(0)
Medal record
Men's football
Representing Indonesia
AFF U-19 Youth Championship
Winner	2013 Indonesia
- * Club domestic league appearances and goals as of 5 February 2025

Ravi Murdianto (born 8 January 1995) is an Indonesian professional footballer who plays as a goalkeeper. He is also a second sergeant in the Indonesian Army.

== Club career ==
Ravi was born in Grobogan Regency, Central Java. During his childhood, Ravi joined the SSB Putra Bersemi team. At that time, he played midfielder and striker positions. Ravi became a goalkeeper starting in the 4th grade. Posture is pretty high is a main factor. In sixth grade, Ravi joined to SSB Tugumuda Semarang to improve his skills. As a teenager, Ravi successfully passed the selection in Diklat Salatiga. Two years later, Ravi joined Diklat Ragunan and from there, his career accelerated. He was selected in Indonesia U-17 and Indonesia U-19

And then, Ravi joined to Perserang Serang in Liga Nusantara

== International career ==
Since Ravi was selected in Indonesia U-17 and U-19 team, Ravi's role as a main goalkeeper in the junior national team is irreplaceable. Along with the Indonesian national team U-17 and U-19 Indonesia, he won in the HKFA Tournament in Hong Kong and 2013 AFF U-19 Youth Championship

== Honours ==
=== International ===
Indonesia U19

- AFF U-19 Youth Championship: 2013
