= Junda Irawan =

Indonesian footballer

Personal information
- Full name: Mochammad Junda Irawan
- Date of birth: 31 May 1996 (age 30)
- Place of birth: Malang, Indonesia
- Height: 1.78 m (5 ft 10 in)
- Position: Defender

Youth career
- 2012–2013: Deportivo Indonesia

Senior career*
Years	Team	Apps	(Gls)
2014–2015	Brisbane Roar Youth	10	(0)
2015–2018	Arema FC	18	(0)
2018–2019	Madura United	6	(0)
2019–2020	Mitra Kukar	14	(1)
2021	PSMS Medan	0	(0)
2021	PSG Pati	3	(0)
2023–2024	Nusantara United	4	(0)
2024	Persikas Subang	9	(0)

International career
2011	Indonesia U16		
2014	Indonesia U19	2	(0)
- * Club domestic league appearances and goals as of 1 December 2024

Mochammad Junda Irawan (born 31 May 1996) is an Indonesian professional footballer who plays as a defender.

== Club career ==
=== Early career ===
In April 2014, Junda was in the selection in Brisbane Roar Youth, and in June 2015, he returned to Malang and joined Arema FC.

=== Arema FC ===
In the opening match of Jendral Sudirman Cup, Arema FC against Persegres Gresik United, Dio Permana and Junda Irawan only played the beginning 12 minutes of the game. After that, Dio and Junda were replaced by senior players, and eventually the game ended and the score was 4-1 for Arema. In the 2016 season, Junda joined in the squad of Arema in 2016 Indonesia Soccer Championship A.

=== Madura United ===
In 2018, Junda Irawan signed a contract with Indonesian Liga 1 club Madura United. He made his league debut on 3 August 2018 in a match against PS TIRA at the Gelora Ratu Pamelingan Stadium, Pamekasan.

=== Mitra Kukar ===
He was signed for Mitra Kukar to play in the Liga 2 in the 2019 season.

=== PSMS Medan ===
In 2021, Junda Irawan signed a contract with Indonesian Liga 2 club PSMS Medan.

=== PSG Pati ===
In 2021, Junda signed a contract with Indonesian Liga 2 club PSG Pati. He made his league debut on 11 October against Persijap Jepara at the Manahan Stadium, Surakarta.

=== Nusantara United ===
On 5 September 2023, Junda signed a contract with other Liga 2 club Nusantara United.

== International career ==
In 2014, Junda represented the Indonesia U-19, in the 2014 AFF U-19 Youth Championship. Junda was included in the U-21 team preparation for the Cotif Tournament in Valencia, Spain, August 10–20, 2014.

== Honours ==
=== Club ===
Arema

- Indonesia President's Cup: 2017
