= Hilmansyah =

Indonesian footballer

Personal information
- Full name: Hilmansyah
- Date of birth: 25 May 1997 (age 29)
- Place of birth: Jeneponto, Indonesia
- Height: 1.83 m (6 ft 0 in)
- Position: Goalkeeper

Team information
- Current team: PSM Makassar
- Number: 97

Youth career
- SSB Puncak FC
- Persijo Jeneponto
- Perseka Bosowa

Senior career*
Years	Team	Apps	(Gls)
2017–2022	PSM Makassar	38	(0)
2022–2024	RANS Nusantara	48	(0)
2024–	PSM Makassar	42	(0)
- * Club domestic league appearances and goals as of 16 October 2026

Hilmansyah (born 25 May 1997) is an Indonesian professional footballer who plays as a goalkeeper for Super League club PSM Makassar.

== Club career ==
=== PSM Makassar ===
He was signed for PSM Makassar to play in Liga 1 in the 2017 season. Hilman made his professional debut on 5 August 2018 in a match against Perseru Serui at the Andi Mattalatta Stadium, Makassar.

=== RANS Nusantara ===
Hilmansyah signed for RANS Nusantara before the 2022–23 season. He made his league debut on 23 July 2022 in an away match against PSIS Semarang at Jatidiri Stadium.

== Personal life ==
Like some Indonesians, Hilmansyah has only one name. However, some sources refer to him as "Hilman Syah".

== Career statistics ==
=== Club ===
As of 6 September 2026

Club	Season	League			Cup (Note: Includes Piala Indonesia)		Continental (Note: Appearances in AFC Cup)		Other		Total	
Club	Season	Division	Apps	Goals	Apps	Goals	Apps	Goals	Apps	Goals	Apps	Goals
PSM Makassar	2018	Liga 1	4	0	0	0	0	0	0	0	4	0
PSM Makassar	2019	Liga 1	7	0	2	0	0	0	0	0	9	0
PSM Makassar	2020	Liga 1	2	0	0	0	1	0	0	0	3	0
PSM Makassar	2021–22	Liga 1	25	0	0	0	0	0	7 (Note: Appearances in Menpora Cup)	0	32	0
PSM Makassar	Total		38	0	2	0	1	0	7	0	48	0
RANS Nusantara	2022–23	Liga 1	21	0	0	0	0	0	2 (Note: Appearances in Indonesia President's Cup)	0	23	0
RANS Nusantara	2023–24	Liga 1	27	0	0	0	–		0	0	27	0
RANS Nusantara	Total		48	0	0	0	0	0	2	0	50	0
PSM Makassar	2024–25	Liga 1	14	0	0	0	0	0	3 (Note: Appearances in ASEAN Club Championship)	0	17	0
PSM Makassar	2025–26	Super League	24	0	0	0	–		0	0	24	0
PSM Makassar	2026–27	Super League	1	0	0	0	–		0	0	1	0
Career total			125	0	2	0	1	0	12	0	140	0

== Honours ==
=== Club ===
PSM Makassar

- Piala Indonesia: 2018–19

Individual

- Liga 1/Super League Save of the Month: October/November 2024, November 2025
