= Siswanto (footballer) =

Indonesian footballer

Personal information
- Full name: Siswanto
- Date of birth: 9 October 1984 (age 42)
- Place of birth: Pasuruan, Indonesia
- Height: 1.65 m (5 ft 5 in)
- Position: Winger

Youth career
- Persekabpas Pasuruan
- Persema Malang

Senior career*
Years	Team	Apps	(Gls)
2004–2006	Persekabpas Pasuruan	52	(10)
2007–2008	Persmin Minahasa	24	(1)
2008–2009	Persib Bandung	22	(0)
2009–2010	Persema Malang	30	(4)
2010–2011	Persib Bandung	22	(0)
2011–2012	Sriwijaya	29	(4)
2012–2013	Gresik United	32	(2)
2013–2014	Sriwijaya	16	(9)
2014–2016	Bhayangkara	35	(12)
2016–2018	Persiba Balikpapan	63	(11)
2018	Kalteng Putra	9	(1)
2019	Sriwijaya	21	(0)
2020	PSKC Cimahi	1	(0)
2021	Persewangi Banyuwangi	3	(0)
2022–2023	PS Siak	15	(3)
2023–2024	Pasuruan United	8	(0)
2024–2025	Persekabpas Pasuruan	7	(0)
Total		389	(57)

International career
2005–2007	Indonesia U23		
2007–2008	Indonesia	1	(0)
- * Club domestic league appearances and goals

Siswanto (born 9 October 1984) is an Indonesian former professional footballer who plays as a winger.

== Career ==
On 2 December 2014, he signed with Persebaya ISL (Bhayangkara FC).

== Honours ==
Sriwijaya

- Indonesia Super League: 2011–12
