= Redouane Zerzouri =

French-Moroccan footballer (born 1989)

Personal information
- Full name: Redouane Zerzouri
- Date of birth: 27 April 1989 (age 37)
- Place of birth: Colombes, France
- Height: 1.81 m (5 ft 11 in)
- Position: Attacking midfielder

Team information
- Current team: Raja Beni Mellal

Senior career*
Years	Team	Apps	(Gls)
2007–2009	Racing Colombes 92	25	(13)
2009–2011	Cremonese	38	(11)
2010	→ Como (loan)	12	(2)
2011–2013	Visé	53	(13)
2013–2017	ASFAR	64	(22)
2017	Madura United	2	(0)
2017	PS TNI	12	(0)
2018	UKM FC	17	(1)
2019	Berkane	7	(0)
2019	FC Saint-Leu 95	5	(1)
2020–	Raja Beni Mellal	6	(0)
- * Club domestic league appearances and goals as of 28 August 2020

Redouane Zerzouri (Arabic: رضوان زرزوري; born 27 April 1989) is a French professional footballer who plays as an attacking midfielder for Raja Beni Mellal.

== Career ==
In January 2019, he moved to Berkane.
