= Reza Mustofa =

Indonesian footballer

Personal information
- Full name: Reza Mustofa Ardiansyah
- Date of birth: 11 September 1989 (age 37)
- Place of birth: Lumajang, Indonesia
- Height: 1.70 m (5 ft 7 in)
- Position: Winger

Youth career
- 2003: PSIL Lumajang
- 2009–2010: Persema Malang

Senior career*
Years	Team	Apps	(Gls)
2004–2005	PS Mojokerto Putra	7	(0)
2006–2007	Persewangi Banyuwangi	15	(1)
2008–2009	Pesik Kuningan	17	(2)
2010–2012	Persema Malang	10	(4)
2012–2013	Arema Cronus	5	(0)
2014	→ Gresik United (loan)	16	(4)
2014–2015	Bhayangkara F.C.	24	(3)
2015	Gresik United	10	(1)
2016	Persiba Balikpapan	5	(0)
2016–2017	Gresik United	9	(0)
2017–2018	Semeru	20	(5)
Total		138	(20)
- * Club domestic league appearances and goals

Reza Mustofa Ardiansyah (born 11 September 1989) is an Indonesian former footballer.

== Career ==
On 25 December 2014, he was announced as a Persebaya player.

== Honours ==
Arema Cronus

- Menpora Cup: 2013
