= Saldi =

- village
- Location in Gujarat, India Saldi (India)
- Coordinates: 23°25′50″N 72°31′43″E
- Country: India
- State: Gujarat
- District: Mehsana
- Elevation: 92 m (302 ft)

Languages
  - Official: Gujarati, Hindi
- Time zone: UTC+5:30 (IST)
- PIN: 382730
- Vehicle registration: GJ-
- Nearest city: Ahmedabad
- Lok Sabha constituency: Mehsana
- Website: gujaratindia.com

Saldi is a village in the Mehsana District, Gujarat, India, Pin Code 382730, situated on State Highway 217 between Gandhinagar and Mehsana. Saldi represents a typical countryside village of India. It borders the following villages: langhnaj, Veda, Parsa, Charadu, Vadasma, Shankarpura, Khata Amba, Khoraj and Himatpura. Saldi is famous for its temple of Pimpleshwar Mahadev, also known as Saldiya Mahadev.

The nearest railway stations are Kalol which is located 25 km and Mehsana 26 km from Saldi. Sardar Patel International Airport - Ahmedabad is about 50 km from Saldi.

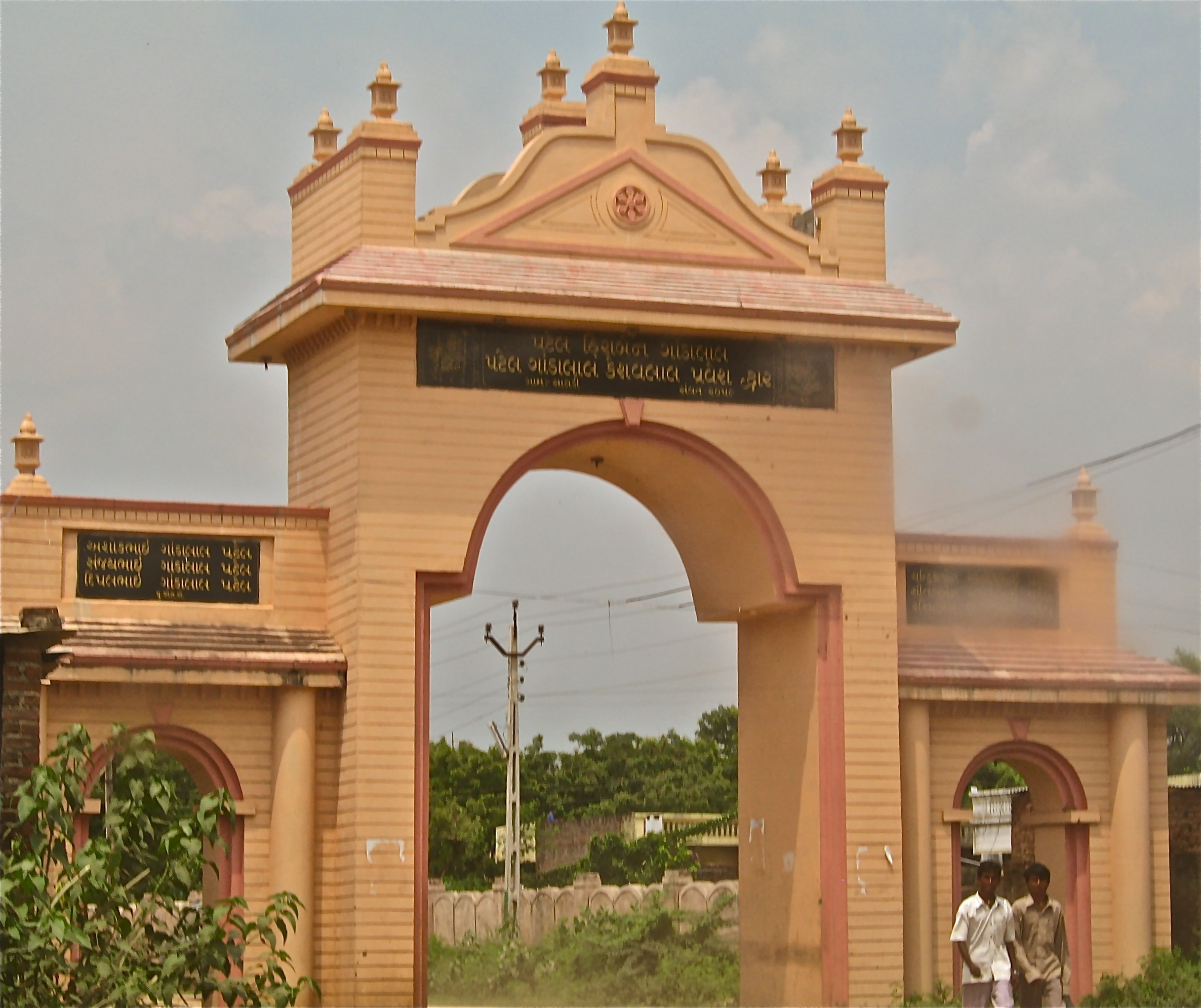

== Geography ==
Location of Saldi, Pin 382730 Dist Mehsana Gujarat India on MAP is Coordinates: 23°25'50"N 72°31'43"E

== Demography ==
Saldi is home of many Hindu, Jain and Islam followers. The total population of is approximately 4000 where Hindus constitute the main population. Patel and Thakore castes constitute major of the total population. Goswami, Brahmin, Jain, Shah, Desai, Panchal, Nayi, Suthar, Raval, Momin, Pathan, Solanki and Prajapati follow them. Ravals work on local transport, lemon tree and on sundries. Peoples from all cast and religion are united for village and live together, work together, celebrate together and help each other in everyday life.

== History ==
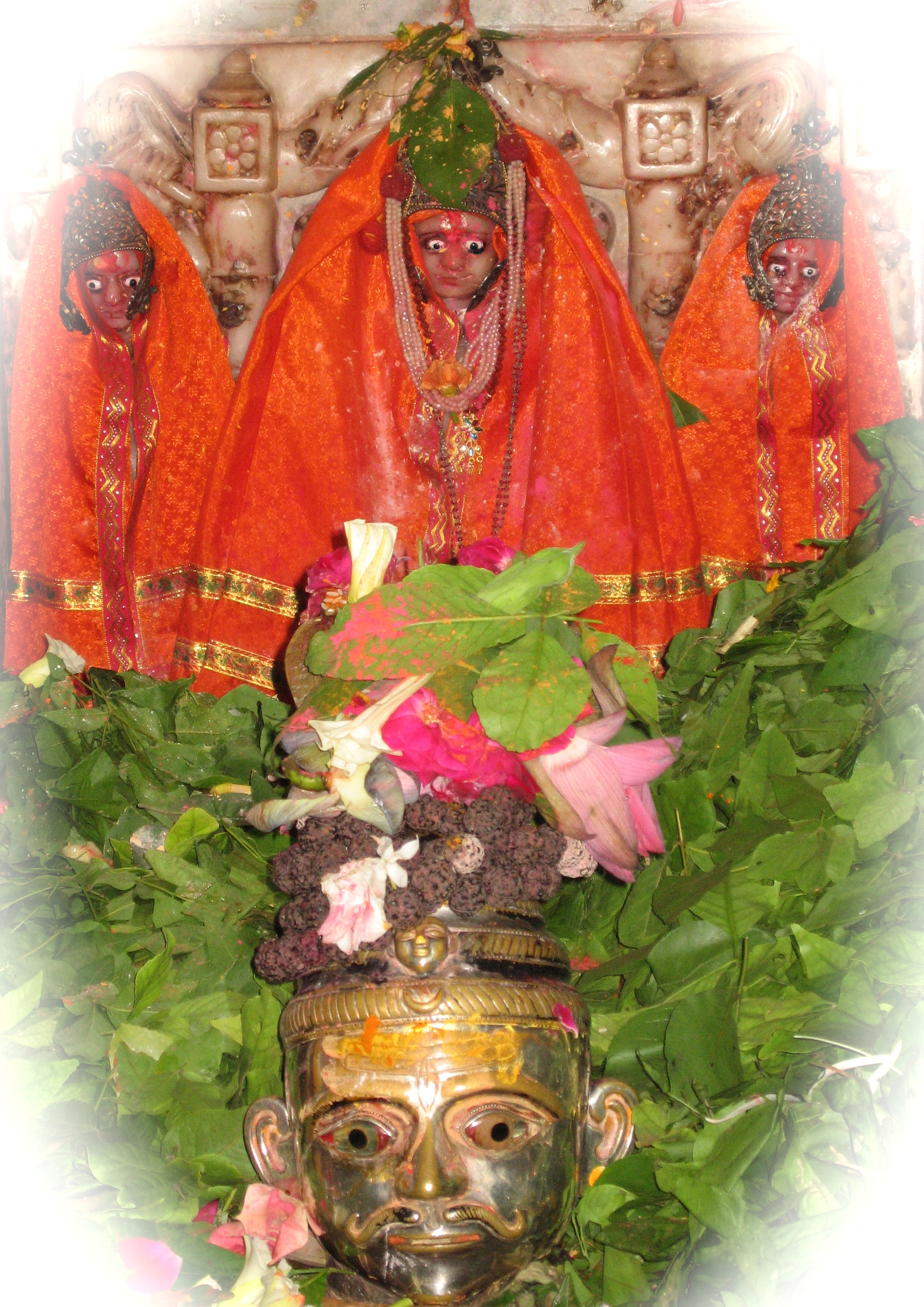
Inside Shree Pimpleshwar Mahadev, Saldi, Gujarat, India

Salvabhai Patel was the son of Teja Patel and he migrated from Champaner, before The young Sultan of Gujarat, Mahmud Begada, deciding to attack Champaner with his army in December 1482. He raised his family in this area which ultimately came to be known as Saldi.

Approximately 200 years or seven generations following the founding of Saldi village, one of the cows of a herder named Petha Patel was found to be regularly offering her milk over one location under a Pimpal tree where the JALADHARI was ultimately found.

In the Hindu tradition, worshipers of Shiva pay homage to the Shivling by pouring milk over a Shivling. Thus, the cow's offering of her milk at this site without any assistance, led to the people of Saldi to attribute this phenomenon to the presence of swayambhu Lord Shiva. Since then, the current site of Pimpleshwar Mahadev is considered to be very sacred by the pilgrims and villagers alike, and it has become famous throughout the state of Gujarat over the years.

The first temple or shrine was put in place by Petha Patel of Saldi at this site dating back Hindu Year Sanvat 1143 ( approximately 924 years ago).

In the following centuries, Pimpleshwar Mahadev gained more popularity as a place of pilgrimage and worship for Hindus across the state of Gujarat. The current building was constructed and renovated by Sayajirao Gaekwad, the ruler of the state Baroda in 1895( approximately 116 years ago ) during the British colonial era in India.

== Education ==
Shree V K Patel Sarvajanik High School (also known as Saldi High School) is a secondary school offer grade 8-10. Smt Chanchalben Vitthaldas M. Patel Primary School is for younger Kids. Students from all surrounding villages come to study at Saldi High School. Saldi offer also has kindergarten and Pre school program at Bal Mandir and AnganVadi.

Residents of Saldi have gone on to work as engineers, physician, and businessmen across India as well as among the Indian diaspora in the United States, Australia, England and Canada.

Notable individuals of high academic excellence include Dr. Raj Dineshbhai Patel, cardiologist working in USA. His sister, Dr. Puja Dineshbhai Patel, and first cousin Dr. Payal Manubhai Sharma also practices medicine in the USA.

== Facilities ==
The village has a well to provide agricultural irrigation and also an overhead water tank for human consumption. Among other facilities are a library, an animal clinic and a post office.

Shiv Dhara Dairy is located in central part of village near Town Hall. Saldi has many of mehsani buffalos. These buffalos are known for good quality and higher production of buffalo milk. Milk is collected on daily basis at Shiv Dhara Dairy ( local dairy ) and transported to Dudhsagar Dairy facility through special network of Gujarat Cooperative Milk Marketing Federation Ltd.

Shooting of "Maa Umiya Annapurna" (a Gujarati Devotional film directed by Mr. Vallabh Choksi) was held in Saldi in 1978.

== Migration ==
A large portion of the population of Saldi has migrated to larger cities in Gujarat, India, and abroad. At least half of all households in Saldi have family members living in the United States or Canada.

== Temples ==
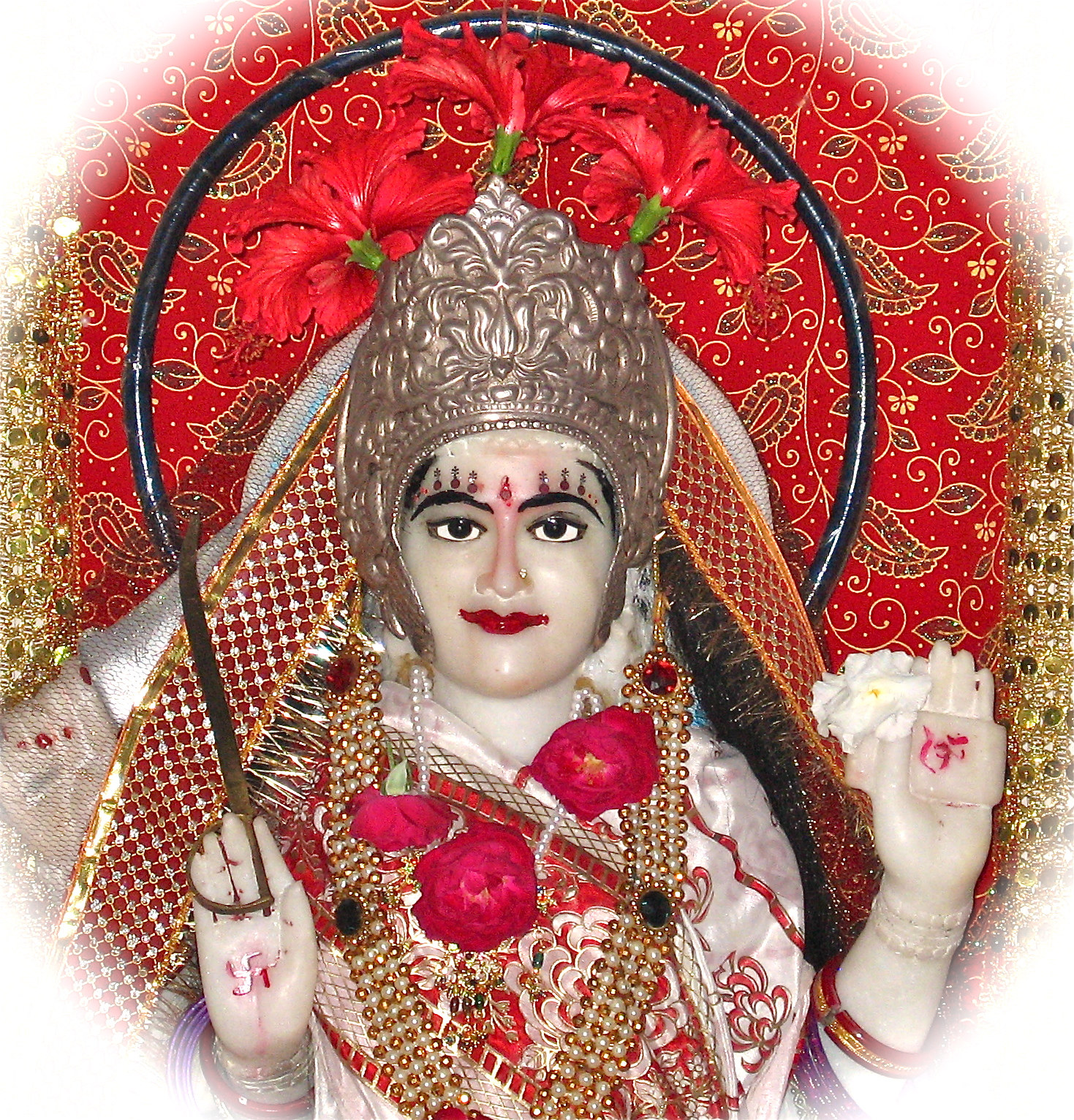

- Pimpleshwar Mahadev Pimpleshwar Mahadev is main attraction and holy site for its devotees.
- Jayashree Mata Temple
- Mahakali Temple
- Ramji Mandir
- Baliya Dev, New Temple open to Public in 2011
- Joganiya Mata Shrine
- Shri Sumtinath Jain Derasar
- Sat Kaival Temple
- Hanuman Temple
- Ramdevpir Temple, New Temple open to Public in 2011
- Brahmani Mata Temple
- Shree Sumatinath Jain Derasar
- Kuvavala Goga Maharaj
