= Angga Saputro =

Indonesian footballer

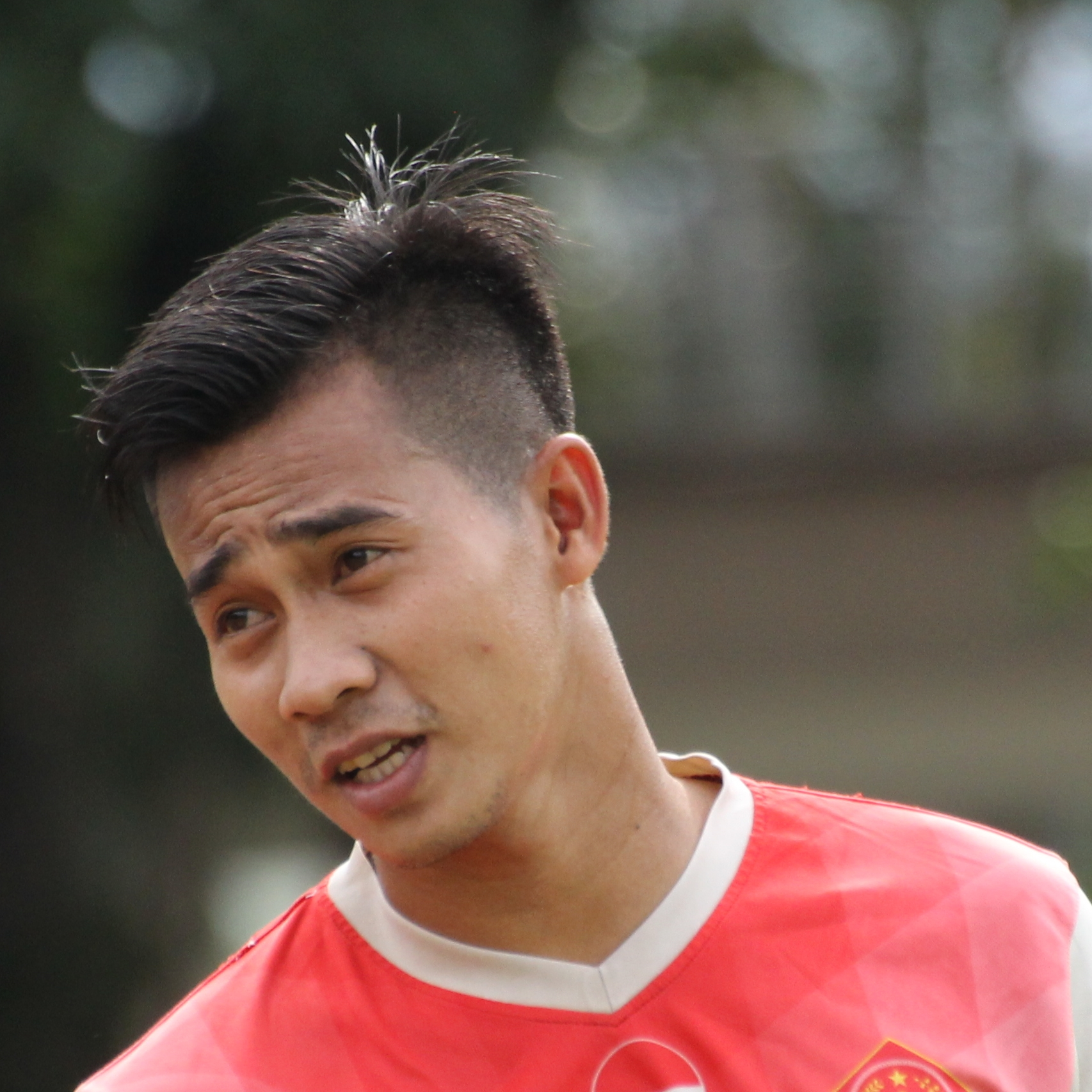
- Angga with TIRA-Persikabo in 2019

Personal information
- Full name: Angga Saputro
- Date of birth: 30 November 1993 (age 32)
- Place of birth: Sidoarjo, Indonesia
- Height: 1.80 m (5 ft 11 in)
- Position: Goalkeeper

Team information
- Current team: Madura United
- Number: 1

Youth career
- 2012: PON JATIM

Senior career*
| Years | Team | Apps | (Gls) |
| 2014–2015 | Persekap Pasuruan | 14 | (0) |
| 2015 | PS TNI | 0 | (0) |
| 2016–2018 | Madura United | 19 | (0) |
| 2018–2019 | TIRA-Persikabo | 38 | (0) |
| 2020–2021 | Persebaya Surabaya | 0 | (0) |
| 2021–2025 | Borneo Samarinda | 46 | (0) |
| 2025–2026 | Malut United | 18 | (0) |
| 2026– | Madura United | 1 | (0) |
- * Club domestic league appearances and goals as of 6 September 2026

Angga Saputro (born 30 November 1993) is an Indonesian professional footballer who plays as a goalkeeper for Super League club Madura United. He is also a Second Sergeant in the Indonesian Army

== Club career ==
=== Madura United ===
On 15 January 2017, Angga signed one-year contract with Liga 1 club Madura United. He made his professional debut in the Liga 1 on 16 April 2017.

=== TIRA-Persikabo ===
In 2018, Angga decided to return to Bogor and signed one-year contract with Liga 1 club TIRA-Persikabo. He made his professional debut in the Liga 1 on 3 August 2018.

=== Persebaya Surabaya ===
On 28 January 2020, Angga signed a one-year contract with Persebaya Surabaya on a free transfer. This season was suspended on 27 March 2020 due to the COVID-19 pandemic. The season was abandoned and was declared void on 20 January 2021.

=== Borneo ===
He was signed for Borneo to play in Liga 1 in the 2021 season. Angga made his debut on 4 September 2021 in a match against Persebaya Surabaya. On 13 June 2025, Angga officially left Borneo Samarinda.

== Honours ==
Persebaya Surabaya

- East Java Governor Cup: 2020

Borneo Samarinda

- Piala Presiden runner-up: 2022, 2024
