= Rendy Siregar =

Indonesian association footballer

Personal information
- Full name: Rendy Siregar
- Date of birth: 14 September 1986 (age 40)
- Place of birth: Jakarta, Indonesia
- Height: 1.75 m (5 ft 9 in)
- Position: Full-back

Youth career
- Persikota Tangerang

Senior career*
Years	Team	Apps	(Gls)
2004–2005	West Persija		
2005–2006	Persikota Tangerang		
2006–2008	Persid Jember		
2008–2009	Persikota Tangerang	24	(3)
2009–2010	PSM Makassar	19	(0)
2010–2012	Sriwijaya	17	(0)
2012–2013	Persela Lamongan	4	(0)
2013–2014	Persiba Balikpapan	46	(0)
2015	Gresik United	3	(0)
2016–2017	Madura United	51	(0)
2018–2021	Mitra Kukar	50	(0)
2022	Sriwijaya	4	(0)

International career
2009	Indonesia U23	3	(1)
- * Club domestic league appearances and goals

Rendy Siregar (born 14 September 1986 in Jakarta) is an Indonesian former footballer who plays as a full-back.

== Club career ==
Siregar previously played for Persiba Balikpapan. In December 2014, he signed with Gresik United.

== International career ==
In 2009, Siregar represented the Indonesia U-23 in the 2009 Southeast Asian Games.

== Honours ==
Sriwijaya

- Indonesian Community Shield: 2010
- Indonesian Inter Island Cup: 2010
