= Engelberd Sani =

Indonesian association footballer

Personal information
- Full name: Engelberd Sani
- Date of birth: 28 May 1990 (age 36)
- Place of birth: Sorong, Indonesia
- Height: 1.71 m (5 ft 7 in)
- Positions: Winger; right-back

Team information
- Current team: Persikos Sorong
- Number: 7

Senior career*
Years	Team	Apps	(Gls)
2007–2008	Persikos Sorong	14	(2)
2009–2010	Persiram Raja Ampat	17	(2)
2010–2012	Pelita Jaya	48	(1)
2012–2016	Arema Cronus	1	(0)
2013–2014	→ Putra Samarinda (loan)	0	(0)
2014–2015	→ Persiram Raja Ampat (loan)	16	(1)
2016–2020	Madura United	95	(9)
2020	Persis Solo	0	(0)
2021	Muba Babel United	10	(2)
2021	Sriwijaya	3	(0)
2022	PSPS Riau	6	(1)
2023–2024	Persipal Palu	9	(0)
2026–	Persikos Sorong	2	(2)

International career
2009–2013	Indonesia U23	7	(0)
- * Club domestic league appearances and goals as of 10 December 2023

Engelberd Sani (born 28 May 1990 in Sorong, West Papua) is an Indonesian professional footballer who plays as a winger or right-back for Liga 4 club Persikos Sorong. He was entered in the Indonesia national U-23 team in the 2009 Southeast Asian Games. He also entered Indonesia national U-21 team in the 2012 Pre-Olympic Tournament. He studied civil engineering at Yogyakarta National Institute of Technology.

== Club career ==
=== Persis Solo ===
He was signed for Persis Solo to play in Liga 2 in the 2020 season. This season was suspended on 27 March 2020 due to the COVID-19 pandemic. The season was abandoned and was declared void on 20 January 2021.

=== Muba Babel United ===
In 2021, Engelberd Sani signed with Indonesian Liga 2 club Muba Babel United. He made his league debut on 6 October against Sriwijaya at the Gelora Sriwijaya Stadium, Palembang.

=== Sriwijaya ===
He was signed for Sriwijaya to play in the second round of Liga 2 in the 2021 season. Sani made his league debut on 15 December 2021 in a match against Persiba Balikpapan at the Pakansari Stadium, Cibinong.

=== PSPS Riau ===
Sani was signed for PSPS Riau to play in Liga 2 in the 2022–23 season. He made his league debut on 29 August 2022 in a match against Semen Padang at the Riau Main Stadium, Riau.

== International career ==
In 2009, Sani represented the Indonesia U-23, in the 2009 Southeast Asian Games.

== Honours ==
=== Club ===
Arema Cronus

- Menpora Cup: 2013
