= Samsul Arifin =

Indonesian footballer (born 1992)

Personal information
- Full name: Samsul Arifin
- Date of birth: 3 January 1992 (age 34)
- Place of birth: Pasuruan, Indonesia
- Height: 1.75 m (5 ft 9 in)
- Position: Left-back

Team information
- Current team: Gresik United
- Number: 4

Senior career*
Years	Team	Apps	(Gls)
2009–2011	Persipro Probolinggo	36	(3)
2011–2013	PSIS Semarang	49	(7)
2014	Persekap Pasuruan	14	(0)
2015	Persegres Gresik United	2	(0)
2016–2019	Persela Lamongan	61	(2)
2020–2021	PSS Sleman	17	(0)
2022–2023	Persik Kediri	5	(0)
2023	Bhayangkara	5	(0)
2023–2024	RANS Nusantara	14	(0)
2024–	Gresik United	12	(0)

International career
2012	Indonesia U21	6	(0)
- * Club domestic league appearances and goals as of 21 February 2025

Samsul Arifin (born 3 January 1992) is an Indonesian professional footballer who plays as a left-back for Liga 2 club Gresik United.

== Club career ==
=== PSS Sleman ===
After four years playing for middling Liga 1 club Persela Lamongan, Arifin signed for PSS Sleman to play in the 2020 Liga 1 season. This season was suspended on 27 March 2020 due to the COVID-19 pandemic. The season was abandoned and was declared void on 20 January 2021.

=== Persik Kediri ===
In 2021, Samsul signed a contract with Indonesian Liga 1 club Persik Kediri. He made his league debut on 10 March 2022 in a match against Persebaya Surabaya at the Kapten I Wayan Dipta Stadium, Gianyar.

=== Bhayangkara ===
On 29 January 2023, Samsul signed a contract with Liga 1 club Bhayangkara from Persik Kediri. Samsul made his league debut for the club in a 1–1 draw against Dewa United.

=== RANS Nusantara ===
Samsul was signed for RANS Nusantara to play in Liga 1 in the 2023–24 season. He made his debut on 3 July 2023 in a match against Persikabo 1973 at the Maguwoharjo Stadium, Sleman.

== International career ==
Arifin called up to Indonesia under-21 team and played in 2012 Hassanal Bolkiah Trophy, but failed to win after losing 0-2 from Brunei under-21 team.

== Honours ==
=== Club ===
PSS Sleman

- Menpora Cup third place: 2021

=== International ===
Indonesia U-21

- Hassanal Bolkiah Trophy runner-up: 2012
