= Rifad Marasabessy =

Indonesian footballer

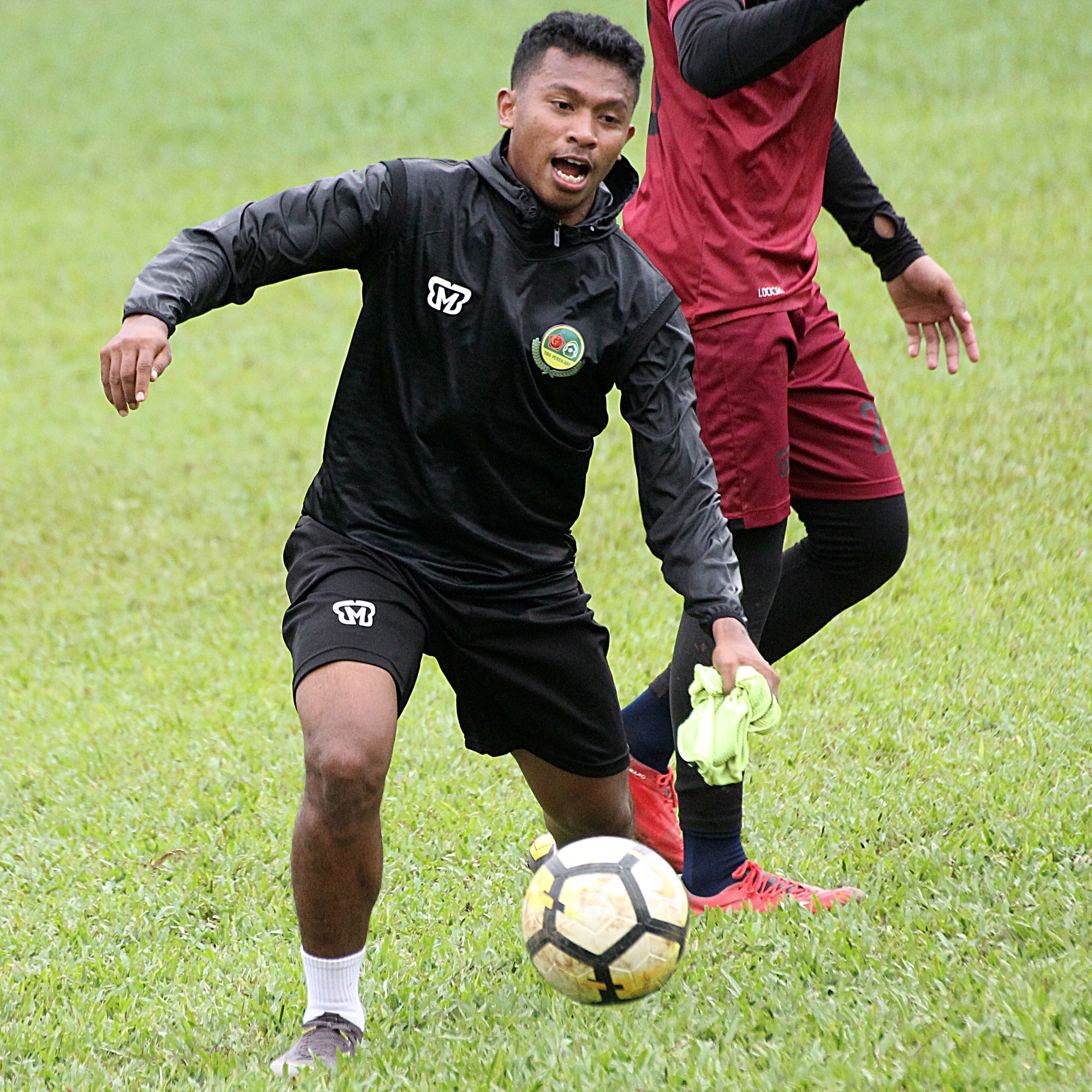
- Marasabessy with TIRA-Persikabo in 2019

Personal information
- Full name: Muhammad Rifad Marasabessy
- Date of birth: 7 July 1999 (age 27)
- Place of birth: Tulehu, Indonesia
- Height: 1.70 m (5 ft 7 in)
- Position: Right back

Team information
- Current team: Borneo Samarinda
- Number: 12

Youth career
- 2015–2016: Semen Padang

Senior career*
| Years | Team | Apps | (Gls) |
| 2017–2018 | Madura United | 14 | (0) |
| 2019–2021 | Persikabo 1973 | 30 | (1) |
| 2021–2023 | Borneo Samarinda | 35 | (0) |
| 2023–2026 | Arema | 35 | (0) |
| 2026– | Borneo Samarinda | 1 | (0) |

International career
| 2017–2018 | Indonesia U19 | 15 | (1) |
| 2019 | Indonesia U23 | 3 | (0) |
| 2021 | Indonesia | 1 | (0) |
Medal record
Men's football
Representing Indonesia
AFF U-19 Youth Championship
| Third place | 2017 Myanmar |
| Third place | 2018 Indonesia | Team |
- * Club domestic league appearances and goals as of 22:00, 20 September 2026 (UTC+7)

Muhammad Rifad Marasabessy (born 7 July 1999) is an Indonesian professional footballer who plays as a right back for Super League club Borneo Samarinda. He is also a Second Sergeant in the Indonesian army.

== Club career ==
=== Madura United ===
In January 2017, Marasabessy signed a two-year contract with Liga 1 club Madura United to commence ahead of the 2017 Liga 1. He made his debut in the Liga 1 on 16 April 2017 against Bali United at the Gelora Ratu Pamelingan Stadium, Pamekasan.

=== TIRA-Persikabo / Persikabo 1973 ===
In February 2019, Marasabessy signed a contract with Liga 1 club TIRA-Persikabo, which is supported by the Indonesian military. He made his debut in the Liga 1, coming as a substitute for Abduh Lestaluhu on 18 May 2018 against Badak Lampung. On 16 July 2019, Marasabessy scored his first league goal in the 2019 Liga 1 for TIRA-Persikabo in a 5–3 victory over Persija Jakarta at the Pakansari Stadium. He played for two years there, appearing in 30 matches, including in games after the club in 2020 changed its name to Persikabo 1973.

=== Borneo Samarinda ===
In 2021, Rifad Marasabessy signed a contract with Liga 1 club Borneo Samarinda. He made his league debut on 4 September 2021 in a match against Persebaya Surabaya at the Wibawa Mukti Stadium, Cikarang.

== International career ==
On 31 May 2017, Marasabessy made his debut for an Indonesian youth team against a Brazil U-20 squad in the 2017 Toulon Tournament in France. He was also one of the players who strengthened the Indonesia U-19 team in the 2018 AFC U-19 Championship.

Marasabessy received a call up to the senior Indonesia national football team in May 2021. He earned his first senior cap in a 25 May 2021 friendly match in Dubai against Afghanistan.

== Career statistics ==
=== Club ===
As of match played 20 September 2026

| Club | Season | League | | | Cup (Note: Includes Piala Indonesia) | | Continental | | Other (Note: Appearances in Indonesia President's Cup) | | Total | |
| Club | Season | Division | Apps | Goals | Apps | Goals | Apps | Goals | Apps | Goals | Apps | Goals |
|---|---|---|---|---|---|---|---|---|---|---|---|---|
| Madura United | 2017 | Liga 1 | 9 | 0 | 0 | 0 | – | | 4 | 0 | 13 | 0 |
| Madura United | 2018 | Liga 1 | 5 | 0 | 0 | 0 | – | | 1 | 0 | 6 | 0 |
| Madura United | Total | | 14 | 0 | 0 | 0 | – | | 5 | 0 | 19 | 0 |
| TIRA-Persikabo | 2019 | Liga 1 | 27 | 1 | 1 | 0 | – | | 4 | 0 | 32 | 1 |
| TIRA-Persikabo | 2020 | Liga 1 | 3 | 0 | 0 | 0 | – | | 0 | 0 | 3 | 0 |
| TIRA-Persikabo | 2021–22 | Liga 1 | 0 | 0 | 0 | 0 | – | | 3 (Note: Appearances in Menpora Cup) | 0 | 3 | 0 |
| TIRA-Persikabo | Total | | 30 | 1 | 1 | 0 | – | | 7 | 0 | 38 | 1 |
| Borneo Samarinda | 2021–22 | Liga 1 | 22 | 0 | 0 | 0 | – | | 0 | 0 | 22 | 0 |
| Borneo Samarinda | 2022–23 | Liga 1 | 13 | 0 | 0 | 0 | – | | 5 | 0 | 18 | 0 |
| Borneo Samarinda | Total | | 35 | 0 | 0 | 0 | – | | 5 | 0 | 40 | 0 |
| Arema | 2023–24 | Liga 1 | 15 | 0 | 0 | 0 | – | | 0 | 0 | 15 | 0 |
| Arema | 2024–25 | Liga 1 | 12 | 0 | 0 | 0 | – | | 0 | 0 | 12 | 0 |
| Arema | 2025–26 | Super League | 8 | 0 | 0 | 0 | – | | 0 | 0 | 8 | 0 |
| Arema | Total | | 35 | 0 | 0 | 0 | – | | 0 | 0 | 35 | 0 |
| Borneo Samarinda | 2026–27 | Super League | 1 | 0 | 0 | 0 | 0 | 0 | 0 | 0 | 1 | 0 |
| Career total | | | 115 | 1 | 1 | 0 | – | | 17 | 0 | 133 | 1 |

=== International ===
As of match played 11 June 2021

Appearances and goals by national team and year
| National team | Year | Apps | Goals |
|---|---|---|---|
| Indonesia | 2021 | 1 | 0 |
| Total | | 1 | 0 |

== Honours ==
Arema

- Piala Presiden: 2024

Indonesia U-19

- AFF U-19 Youth Championship third place: 2017, 2018
