= Andik Rendika Rama =

Indonesian footballer

Personal information
- Full name: Andik Rendika Rama
- Date of birth: 16 March 1993 (age 33)
- Place of birth: Gresik, Indonesia
- Height: 1.78 m (5 ft 10 in)
- Position: Left-back

Team information
- Current team: PSPS Pekanbaru
- Number: 3

Youth career
- 2009: Persebaya Surabaya

Senior career*
Years	Team	Apps	(Gls)
2012–2014	Deltras Sidoarjo	26	(0)
2015	Persela Lamongan	1	(0)
2016	Persija Jakarta	31	(0)
2017–2022	Madura United	108	(0)
2022–2023	Arema	9	(0)
2023–2024	Madura United	2	(0)
2023–2024	→ Bhayangkara (loan)	4	(0)
2024–2025	Persela Lamongan	2	(0)
2025–2026	Persekat Tegal	22	(0)
2026–	PSPS Pekanbaru	1	(0)
- * Club domestic league appearances and goals as of 11 September 2026

Andik Rendika Rama (born 16 March 1993) is an Indonesian professional footballer who plays as a left-back for Championship club PSPS Pekanbaru.

== Club career ==
=== Early career ===
When 16 years old, Andik already far apart the family, he joined to the Persebaya Surabaya U21 in 2009–10 Indonesia Super League U-21. Shown impressive in Persebaya U-21, Andik moved to Deltras Sidoarjo U21 in 2012 until 2014. and in 2015, Andik moved to Persela Lamongan and eventually joined to Persija Jakarta.

=== Persija Jakarta ===
He was signed for Persija Jakarta to play in Indonesia Soccer Championship A in 2016. Andik made his First debut with Persija Jakarta against Persipura Jayapura in the first week of the 2016 Indonesia Soccer Championship A.

=== Madura United ===
In 2017, Andik joined to Madura United family factors made it had to take this decision, because his grandma was sick. He made his league debut on 16 April 2017 in a match against Bali United at the Gelora Ratu Pamelingan Stadium, Pamekasan.

=== Arema ===
On 5 April 2022, Andik signed contract for Arema. He made his league debut on 11 September 2022 in a match against Persib Bandung at the Kanjuruhan Stadium, Malang.

=== Return to Madura United ===
Rendika was signed for Madura United to play in Liga 1 in the 2023–24 season. He made his debut on 2 July 2023 in a match against Persib Bandung at the Gelora Bandung Lautan Api Stadium, Bandung.

== Career statistics ==
=== Club ===
As of match played 11 September 2026

Club	Season	League			Cup (Note: Includes Piala Indonesia)		Continental		Other (Note: Appearances in Piala Presiden)		Total	
Club	Season	Division	Apps	Goals	Apps	Goals	Apps	Goals	Apps	Goals	Apps	Goals
Persela Lamongan	2015	Indonesia Super League	1	0	0	0	—		3	0	4	0
Persija Jakarta	2016	ISC A	31	0	0	0	—		0	0	31	0
Madura United	2017	Liga 1	27	0	0	0	—		4	0	31	0
Madura United	2018	Liga 1	28	0	0	0	—		3	0	31	0
Madura United	2019	Liga 1	31	0	5	0	—		5	0	41	0
Madura United	2020	Liga 1	3	0	0	0	—		0	0	3	0
Madura United	2021–22	Liga 1	18	0	0	0	—		4 (Note: Appearances in Menpora Cup)	0	22	0
Madura United	Total		108	0	0	0	—		16	0	124	0
Arema	2022–23	Liga 1	9	0	0	0	—		2	0	11	0
Madura United	2023–24	Liga 1	2	0	0	0	—		0	0	2	0
Bhayangkara (loan)	2023–24	Liga 1	4	0	0	0	—		0	0	4	0
Persela Lamongan	2024–25	Liga 2	2	0	0	0	—		0	0	2	0
Persekat Tegal	2025–26	Championship	22	0	0	0	—		0	0	22	0
PSPS Pekanbaru	2026–27	Championship	1	0	0	0	—		0	0	1	0
Career total			179	0	5	0	0	0	21	0	206	0

== Honours ==
Arema

- Piala Presiden: 2022
