= Asep Berlian =

Indonesian footballer (born 1990)

Personal information
- Full name: Asep Berlian
- Date of birth: 11 July 1990 (age 36)
- Place of birth: Bogor, Indonesia
- Height: 1.78 m (5 ft 10 in)
- Position: Defensive midfielder

Team information
- Current team: Persis Solo
- Number: 4

Youth career
- 2010: Pelita Jaya
- 2011–2013: Persika Karawang

Senior career*
Years	Team	Apps	(Gls)
2014	Persik Kediri	12	(0)
2014–2015	Persebaya DU	1	(0)
2016–2022	Madura United	140	(2)
2022–2025	Dewa United	44	(0)
2025–2026	Garudayaksa	20	(2)
2026–	Persis Solo	1	(0)
- * Club domestic league appearances and goals as of 22:20, 13 September 2026 (UTC)

Asep Berlian (born 11 July 1990) is an Indonesian professional footballer who plays as a defensive midfielder for Championship club Persis Solo.

== Personal life ==
Berlian was born in Bogor City, Indonesia. In 2021, he and Indonesian footballer Gunawan Dwi Cahyo founded SSB Wira Pratama, a football school. As a native of Bogor, he wants to advance Bogor City football, and put it in professional football players.

== Club career ==
=== Persebaya DU ===
On 4 December 2014, he moved to Persebaya DU.

=== Madura United ===
Berlian joined Madura United in 2016. He made his debut when against PS TNI in the first week 2016 Indonesia Soccer Championship B.

=== Dewa United ===
Berlian was signed for Dewa United to play in Liga 1 in the 2022–23 season. He made his league debut on 25 July 2022 in a match against Persis Solo at the Moch. Soebroto Stadium, Magelang. On 29 June 2025, Berlian officially left from Dewa United.

== Honours ==
Garudayaksa

- Championship: 2025–26
