= Munhar =

Indonesian footballer

Personal information
- Full name: Munhar
- Date of birth: 5 October 1986 (age 40)
- Place of birth: Sidoarjo, Indonesia
- Height: 1.80 m (5 ft 11 in)
- Positions: Centre-back; right-back

Youth career
- 2007: Persema Malang

Senior career*
Years	Team	Apps	(Gls)
2008–2011	Persema Malang	47	(0)
2011–2014	Arema Cronus	33	(0)
2014–2015	Bhayangkara	0	(0)
2016–2018	Madura United	64	(3)
2019	PSM Makassar	4	(0)
2020–2021	Persik Kediri	0	(0)
2021	Persekat Tegal	4	(0)
2022	PSPS Riau	2	(0)
2023–2024	Persibo Bojonegoro	9	(2)
2024–2025	RANS Nusantara	14	(0)
- * Club domestic league appearances and goals as of 17:08, 25 February 2025 (UTC +7)

Munhar (born 5 October 1986) is an Indonesian professional footballer who plays as a centre-back or right-back.

== Honours ==
Persema Malang

- Liga Indonesia Premier Division runner up: 2008–09

Arema Cronus

- Menpora Cup: 2013

PSM Makassar

- Piala Indonesia: 2018–19
