= Hery Prasetyo =

Indonesian footballer (born 1985)

Personal information
- Full name: Hery Prasetyo
- Date of birth: 28 April 1985 (age 41)
- Place of birth: Malang, Indonesia
- Height: 1.79 m (5 ft 10 in)
- Position: Goalkeeper

Senior career*
Years	Team	Apps	(Gls)
2008−2010	Persibo Bojonegoro	44	(0)
2010−2011	Persik Kediri	20	(0)
2011−2014	Gresik United	58	(0)
2015	Bhayangkara	0	(0)
2016–2018	Madura United	53	(0)
2019	PSM Makassar	2	(0)
2020	Putra Sinar Giri	0	(0)
2022	PSKC Cimahi	6	(0)
2023–2024	Persikab Bandung	11	(0)
2024–2025	RANS Nusantara	10	(0)
- * Club domestic league appearances and goals as of 19:40, 25 February 2025 (UTC)

Hery Prasetyo (born 28 April 1985) is an Indonesian professional footballer who plays as a goalkeeper.

== Career ==
On 4 December 2014, he signed with Persebaya ISL (Bhayangkara).

== Honours ==
Persibo Bojonegoro

- Liga Indonesia Premier Division: 2009–10

PSM Makassar

- Piala Indonesia: 2018–19

=== Olympic ===
- Pekan Olahraga Nasional (gold) Gold Medal: 2008
