= 2011–12 Liga Indonesia Premier Division knockout stage =

The knockout stage of 2011-12 Liga Indonesia Premier Division took place between July 5, 2012 and July 8, 2012 with the final at the Manahan Stadium in Surakarta, Central Java. To determine which teams who were to be promoted to the Indonesia Super League After the completion of the group stage on 1 July 2012, four teams qualified for the semi-finals (two from each group), which were played from 5 July 2012. The Champions, Runner-Up, and the 3rd Place finishers directly qualified to the 2012-13 Indonesia Super League with the 4th-place finisher qualified via Play-off with the 15th-place finisher of the 2011-12 Indonesia Super League.

== Qualified teams ==
Group	Winners	Runners-up
A	Persepam	Persita
B	PSIM	Barito Putera

== Bracket ==
Semi-finals
5 July – Solo, Central Java
Persepam	0
Barito Putera	2
5 July – Solo, Central Java
PSIM	0
Persita	1

Final
8 July - Solo, Central Java
Barito Putera	2
Persita	1
Third place
8 July – Solo, Central Java
Persepam	1
PSIM	0

== Semi-finals ==
=== Persepam vs Barito Putera ===
5 July 2012
15:30 WIB

Persepam	0 - 2	Barito Putera (P)
	Report	29' (o.g.) Yoga; 73' Nehemia

Manahan Stadium, Solo, Central Java
Attendance: 2,139
Referee: Adi Riyanto

Persepam	Barito Putera

PERSEPAM:
GK	1	Alfonsius Kelvan
RB	3	Khokok Roniarto
CB	4	Barkah Crustianhadi
CB	5	(Cameroon) Mohamadou Tassiou Bako (c)	(yellow card) 45'
LB	6	Yoga Spria Mirshadaq		(substituted off) 66'
RM	9	Indriyanto Setyo Nugroho	(yellow card) 45'	(substituted off) 55'
CM	8	(Brazil) Evandro		(substituted off) 50'
CM	21	M. Rudy Hermawan Suhartoyo
LM	7	Ishak Y.M. Djober	(yellow card) 60'
ST	10	(Cameroon) Martial Poungoue Nz
ST	11	Sudirman
Substitutions:
MF	18	Mohammad Anshorudin		(substituted on) 50'
FW	29	Muhammad Husen		(substituted on) 55'
FW	20	Surono		(substituted on) 66'
Coach:
(Indonesia) Winedi Purwito

BARITO PUTERA:
GK	27	Dedy Sutanto
RB	21	Agustiar Batubara	(yellow card) 78'
CB	5	(Cameroon) Henry Njombi Elad
CB	18	Guntur Ariyadi
LB	3	Ahmad Zahrul Huda
CM	7	Septariyanto
CM	8	Amirul Mukminin
CM	29	Ana Supriatna
AM	99	(Liberia) Sackie Teah Doe
ST	17	(Cameroon) Bienvenue Nnengue	(yellow card) 61'	(substituted off) 89'
ST	9	Sugeng Wahyudi		(substituted off) 29'
Substitutions:
FW	43	Syaifullah Nazar		(substituted on) 29'	(substituted off) 72'
FW	15	Nehemia Solossa		(substituted on) 72'
MF	10	Sartibi Darwis		(substituted on) 89'
Coach:
Solehudin

Man of the Match:

Assistant referees:
Fahrizal M. Kahar
M. Syamsuri
Fourth official:
Suharto

=== PSIM vs Persita ===
5 July 2012
19:00 WIB

PSIM	0 - 1	Persita (P)
	Report	30' Veron

Manahan Stadium, Solo, Central Java
Attendance: 2,219
Referee: Thoriq M. Alkatiri

PSIM	Persita

PSIM:
GK	22	Agung Prasetya
RB	2	Duslan Lestaluhu
CB	15	Abda Ali
CB	23	Eko Pujiyanto
LB	11	Topas Pamungkas
RM	35	(Netherlands) Lorenzo Rimkus		(substituted off) 76'
CM	16	Eko Budi Santoso
CM	32	(Netherlands) Kristian Adelmund		(substituted off) 52'
LM	17	Mochammad Irfan	(yellow card) 90+1'
ST	7	Nova Zaenal (c)		(substituted off) 46'
ST	99	(Netherlands) Emile Linkers	(yellow card) 11'
Substitutions:
MF	5	Seto Nurdiyantara		(substituted on) 46'
FW	12	Lukman Salan		(substituted on) 52'
MF	20	Moch Romli		(substituted on) 76'
Coach:
Hanafing

PERSITA:
GK	28	Tema Mursadat
RB	26	Rizky Rizal Ripora
CB	3	(Chile) Luis Edmundo (c)
CB	14	Rohmat		(substituted off) 69'
LB	16	Rio Ramandika
RM	7	Ade Jantra Lukmana		(substituted off) 80'
CM	23	Maman
CM	27	Andy Dwi Kurniawan	(yellow card) 87'
LM	13	Hendra Bastian	(yellow card) 46'	(substituted off) 46'
SS	10	(Argentina) Leo Veron	(yellow card) 31'
CF	99	(Chile) Cristian Carrasco	(yellow card) 90+3'
Substitutions:
MF	6	Junaidi		(substituted on) 46'
DF	45	Dominggus Fakdawer		(substituted on) 69'
MF	51	Lingga Ashadi		(substituted on) 80'
Coach:
Elly Idris

Man of the Match:

Assistant referees:
Jhonie
Suadi Yunus
Fourth official:
Setiyono, Spd

== Third-placed ==
8 July 2012
15:30 WIB

Persepam	1 – 0	PSIM
Anshorudin 48'	Report

Manahan Stadium, Solo, Central Java
Attendance: 2,137
Referee: Najamuddin Aspiran

Persepam	PSIM

PERSEPAM:
GK	1	Alfonsius Kelvan
RB	3	Khokok Roniarto
CB	4	Barkah Crustianhadi
CB	2	Fadli Haris		(substituted off) 68'
LB	6	Yoga Spria Mirshadaq
RM	9	Indriyanto Setyo Nugroho (c)		(substituted off) 57'
CM	8	(Brazil) Evandro
CM	21	M. Rudy Hermawan Suhartoyo		(substituted off) 47'
LM	7	Ishak Y.M. Djober
ST	10	(Cameroon) Martial Poungoue Nz
ST	11	Sudirman
Substitutions:
MF	18	Mohammad Anshorudin		(substituted on) 47'
FW	16	Nur Huda		(substituted on) 57'
FW	20	Surono	(yellow card) 79'	(substituted on) 68'
Coach:
(Indonesia) Winedi Purwito

PSIM:
GK	22	Agung Prasetya	(yellow card) 83'
RB	2	Duslan Lestaluhu	(yellow card) 85'
CB	15	Abda Ali
CB	23	Eko Pujiyanto
LB	11	Topas Pamungkas
RM	7	Nova Zaenal (c)
CM	16	Eko Budi Santoso	(yellow card) 10'
CM	35	(Netherlands) Lorenzo Rimkus		(substituted off) 45'
LM	17	Mochammad Irfan
ST	12	Lukman Salan		(substituted off) 46'
ST	97	Johan Arga Pramudya		(substituted off) 64'
Substitutions:
MF	20	Moch Romli		(substituted on) 45'
MF	5	Seto Nurdiyantara		(substituted on) 46'
FW	9	Muhammad Rifki		(substituted on) 64'
Coach:
Hanafing

Man of the Match:

Assistant referees:
Fahrizal M. Kahar
M. Syamsuri
Fourth official:
Thoriq M. Alkatiri

== Final ==
8 July 2012
19:00 WIB

Barito Putera	2 – 1	Persita Tangerang
Wahyudi 31'; Doe 55'	Report	71' Ade

Manahan Stadium, Solo, Central Java
Attendance: 2,752
Referee: Suharto

Barito Putera	Persita

BARITO PUTERA
GK	27	(Indonesia) Dedy Sutanto
RB	21	(Indonesia) Agustiar Batubara
CB	5	(Cameroon) Henry Njombi Elad	(yellow card) 19'
CB	18	(Indonesia) Guntur Ariyadi
LB	3	(Indonesia) Ahmad Zahrul Huda	(yellow card) 37'	(substituted off) 64'
DM	7	(Indonesia) Septariyanto	(yellow card) 32'
RM	29	(Indonesia) Ana Supriatna
LM	8	(Indonesia) Amirul Mukminin
AM	99	(Liberia) Sackie Teah Doe
ST	43	(Indonesia) Syaifullah Nazar		(substituted off) 70'
ST	9	(Indonesia) Sugeng Wahyudi		(substituted off) 46'
Substitutions:
GK	32	(Indonesia) David Ariyanto
DF	23	(Indonesia) Mujib Ridwan
DF	6	(Indonesia) Maidiansyah
MF	2	(Indonesia) Andriyansyah		(substituted on) 64'
MF	10	(Indonesia) Sartibi Darwis		(substituted on) 70'
FW	15	(Indonesia) Nehemia Solossa		(substituted on) 46'
FW	19	(Indonesia) Andri Joko
Coach:
(Indonesia) Salahudin

PERSITA
GK	28	(Indonesia) Tema Mursadat
RB	26	(Indonesia) Rizky Rizal Ripora
CB	3	(Chile) Luis Edmundo (c)
CB	14	(Indonesia) Rohmat	(yellow card) 43'
LB	16	(Indonesia) Rio Ramandika	(yellow card) 24'
RM	7	(Indonesia) Ade Jantra Lukmana		(substituted off) 86'
CM	23	(Indonesia) Maman
CM	27	(Indonesia) Andy Dwi Kurniawan
LM	13	(Indonesia) Hendra Bastian		(substituted off) 56'
SS	10	(Argentina) Leo Veron
CF	99	(Chile) Cristian Carrasco
Substitutions:
GK	1	(Indonesia) Mukti Ali Raja
DF	21	(Indonesia) Rama Pratama
DF	45	(Indonesia) Dominggus Fakdawer
MF	6	(Indonesia) Junaidi		(substituted on) 86'
MF	51	(Indonesia) Lingga Ashadi
FW	17	(Indonesia) Rishadi Fauzi		(substituted on) 56'	(substituted off) 83'
FW	32	(Indonesia) Muhammad Agus Salim		(substituted on) 83'
Coach:
(Indonesia) Elly Idris

Man of the Match:
Cristian Carrasco

Assistant referees:
Jhonie
Suadi Yunus
Fourth official:
Setiyono, Spd

== Promotion/relegation play-off ==
17 July 2012
15:30 UTC+7

Gresik United (O) Indonesia Super League	3 – 1	PSIM Yogyakarta Liga Indonesia Premier Division
Castano 27'; Chena 56', 74'	Report	80' Lukman

Gelora Sriwijaya Stadium
Attendance: 523
Referee: Dodi Setia Purnama (Indonesia)

NB: (O) = Play-off winner; (P) = Promoted to 2012–13 Indonesia Super League; (R) = Relegated to 2012–13 Liga Indonesia Premier Division.
