= 2012 Liga Indonesia Premier Division final =

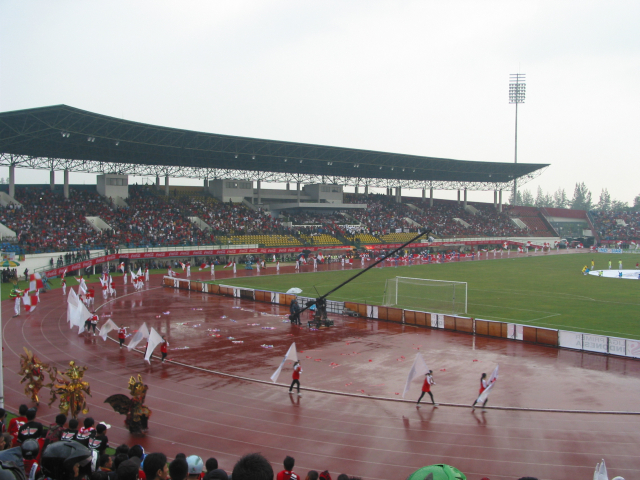
- Event: 2011–12 Liga Indonesia Premier Division
PS Barito Putera	Persita Tangerang
(Indonesia)	(Indonesia)
2	1
- Details
- Date: 8 July 2012
- Venue: Manahan Stadium, Surakarta
- Premier Division Man of the Match: Cristian Carrasco (Persita Tangerang)
- Referee: Suharto (Indonesia)
- Attendance: 2,752
- Weather: Fine

The 2011 Liga Indonesia Premier Division final is a scheduled football match played on 8 July 2012 at the Manahan Stadium in Surakarta, Indonesia, to determine the winner of 2011–12 Liga Indonesia Premier Division.

PS Barito Putera took the title after defeating Persita Tangerang in the final with a score of 2–1. This was their first premier division title.

== Route to the Final ==
PS Barito Putera			Stages	Persita Tangerang		
Main article: 2011–12 Liga Indonesia Premier Division (LI) § Group 2: Pos / Team / Pld / W / D / L / GF / GA / GD / Pts; 1 / PS Barito Putera / 20 / 13 / 4 / 3 / 41 / 15 / +26 / 43; 2 / Persepam Pamekasan / 20 / 11 / 5 / 4 / 26 / 16 / +10 / 38; 3 / KSB West Sumbawa / 20 / 9 / 6 / 5 / 21 / 18 / +3 / 33; 4 / PSBK Blitar / 20 / 9 / 4 / 7 / 24 / 17 / +7 / 31; 5 / PSBS Biak Numfor / 20 / 7 / 8 / 5 / 27 / 22 / +5 / 29; 6 / Perseru Serui / 20 / 8 / 3 / 9 / 24 / 18 / +6 / 27; 7 / Persigo Gorontalo / 20 / 8 / 3 / 9 / 22 / 37 / -15 / 27; 8 / Persid Jember / 20 / 7 / 2 / 11 / 20 / 23 / -3 / 23; 9 / Persekam Metro FC / 20 / 5 / 5 / 10 / 22 / 27 / -5 / 20; 10 / Perssin Sinjai / 20 / 6 / 4 / 10 / 22 / 35 / -13 / 16^{(-6)}; 11 / PS Mojokerto Putra / 20 / 3 / 4 / 13 / 11 / 32 / -19 / 13			1st Round	Main article: 2011–12 Liga Indonesia Premier Division (LI) § Group 1: Pos / Team / Pld / W / D / L / GF / GA / GD / Pts; 1 / Persita Tangerang / 20 / 13 / 5 / 2 / 37 / 13 / +24 / 44; 2 / Persebaya Surabaya / 20 / 12 / 2 / 6 / 34 / 19 / +15 / 38; 3 / Persiku Kudus / 20 / 9 / 8 / 3 / 29 / 16 / +13 / 35; 4 / PSIM Yogyakarta / 20 / 9 / 6 / 5 / 26 / 20 / +6 / 33; 5 / Persitara Jakarta Utara / 20 / 9 / 3 / 8 / 31 / 23 / +8 / 30; 6 / Persip Pekalongan / 20 / 8 / 3 / 9 / 25 / 24 / +1 / 27; 7 / Persis Solo / 20 / 6 / 5 / 9 / 19 / 26 / -7 / 23; 8 / Persih Tembilahan / 20 / 6 / 4 / 10 / 18 / 27 / -9 / 22; 9 / Persitema Temanggung / 20 / 6 / 2 / 12 / 15 / 32 / -17 / 20; 10 / PS Bengkulu / 20 / 5 / 4 / 11 / 15 / 30 / -15 / 19; 11 / PSGL Gayo Lues / 20 / 4 / 4 / 12 / 18 / 37 / -19 / 16		
Main article: 2011-12 Liga Indonesia Premier Division second round Group B: Team / Pld / W / D / L / GF / GA / GD / Pts; PSIM Yogyakarta / 3 / 3 / 0 / 0 / 5 / 2 / +3 / 9; PS Barito Putera / 3 / 1 / 1 / 1 / 6 / 3 / +3 / 4; Persebaya Surabaya / 3 / 1 / 0 / 2 / 4 / 7 / −3 / 3; PS Sumbawa Barat / 3 / 0 / 1 / 2 / 2 / 5 / −3 / 1			2nd Round	Main article: 2011-12 Liga Indonesia Premier Division second round Group A: Team / Pld / W / D / L / GF / GA / GD / Pts; Persepam Madura United / 3 / 2 / 0 / 1 / 3 / 3 / 0 / 6; Persita Tangerang / 3 / 1 / 2 / 0 / 5 / 3 / +2 / 5; PSBK Blitar / 3 / 1 / 1 / 1 / 4 / 3 / +1 / 4; Persiku Kudus / 3 / 0 / 1 / 2 / 2 / 5 / −3 / 1		
Opponent	Result	Legs	Knockout Stage	Opponent	Result	Legs
Persepam	2 - 0	One-leg match	Semi-finals	PSIM	1-0	One-leg match

== Match ==
8 July 2012
19:00 WIB

Barito Putera	2 – 1	Persita Tangerang
Wahyudi 31'; Doe 55'	Report	71' Ade

Manahan Stadium, Solo, Central Java
Attendance: 2,752
Referee: Suharto

Barito Putera	Persita

BARITO PUTERA:4-4-2
GK	27	(Indonesia) Dedy Sutanto
RB	21	(Indonesia) Agustiar Batubara
CB	5	(Cameroon) Henry Njombi Elad	(yellow card) 19'
CB	18	(Indonesia) Guntur Ariyadi
LB	3	(Indonesia) Ahmad Zahrul Huda	(yellow card) 37'	(substituted off) 64'
DM	7	(Indonesia) Septariyanto	(yellow card) 32'
RM	29	(Indonesia) Ana Supriatna
LM	8	(Indonesia) Amirul Mukminin
AM	99	(Liberia) Sackie Teah Doe
ST	43	(Indonesia) Syaifullah Nazar		(substituted off) 70'
ST	9	(Indonesia) Sugeng Wahyudi		(substituted off) 46'
Substitutions:
GK	32	(Indonesia) David Ariyanto
DF	23	(Indonesia) Mujib Ridwan
DF	6	(Indonesia) Maidiansyah
MF	2	(Indonesia) Andriyansyah		(substituted on) 64'
MF	10	(Indonesia) Sartibi Darwis		(substituted on) 70'
FW	15	(Indonesia) Nehemia Solossa		(substituted on) 46'
FW	19	(Indonesia) Andri Joko
Coach:
(Indonesia) Salahudin

PERSITA:4-4-1-1
GK	28	(Indonesia) Tema Mursadat
RB	26	(Indonesia) Rizky Rizal Ripora
CB	3	(Chile) Luis Edmundo (c)
CB	14	(Indonesia) Rohmat	(yellow card) 43'
LB	16	(Indonesia) Rio Ramandika	(yellow card) 24'
RM	7	(Indonesia) Ade Jantra Lukmana		(substituted off) 86'
CM	23	(Indonesia) Maman
CM	27	(Indonesia) Andy Dwi Kurniawan
LM	13	(Indonesia) Hendra Bastian		(substituted off) 56'
SS	10	(Argentina) Leo Veron
CF	99	(Chile) Cristian Carrasco
Substitutions:
GK	1	(Indonesia) Mukti Ali Raja
DF	21	(Indonesia) Rama Pratama
DF	45	(Indonesia) Dominggus Fakdawer
MF	6	(Indonesia) Junaidi		(substituted on) 86'
MF	51	(Indonesia) Lingga Ashadi
FW	17	(Indonesia) Rishadi Fauzi		(substituted on) 56'	(substituted off) 83'
FW	32	(Indonesia) Muhammad Agus Salim		(substituted on) 83'
Coach:
(Indonesia) Elly Idris

Man of the Match:
Cristian Carrasco

Assistant referees:
Jhonie
Suadi Yunus
Fourth official:
Setiyono, Spd

Match rules

- 90 minutes.
- 30 minutes of extra time if necessary.
- Penalty shoot-out if scores still level.
- Seven named substitutes, of which up to three may be used.
