= 2011–12 Liga Indonesia Premier Division second round Group B =

Group B of 2011-12 Liga Indonesia Premier Division second round was played from 26 to 1 July 2012. The pool was made up of host PSIM Yogyakarta, PS Sumbawa Barat, Persebaya DU (Bhayangkara) and PS Barito Putera.

== Standings ==
Key to colours in group tables
Team progressed to the Semi-Finals

| Team | Pld | W | D | L | GF | GA | GD | Pts |
|---|---|---|---|---|---|---|---|---|
| PSIM Yogyakarta | 3 | 3 | 0 | 0 | 5 | 2 | +3 | 9 |
| PS Barito Putera | 3 | 1 | 1 | 1 | 6 | 3 | +3 | 4 |
| Persebaya DU (Bhayangkara) | 3 | 1 | 0 | 2 | 4 | 7 | −3 | 3 |
| PS Sumbawa Barat | 3 | 0 | 1 | 2 | 2 | 5 | −3 | 1 |

All times local (WIB)

== Barito Putera vs Persebaya DU (Bhayangkara) ==
26 June 2012
15:15

| Barito Putera | 5 - 1 | Persebaya DU (Bhayangkara) |
|---|---|---|
| Nnengue 27' 72'; Nazar 45'; Nehemia 76'; Sackie 89' | Report | Obiora 49' |

Mandala Krida Stadium, Yogyakarta
Attendance: 2,367
Referee: Adi Riyanto

| Barito Putera | Persebaya DU (Bhayangkara) |

BARITO PUTERA:
| GK | 27 | Dedy Sutanto |
| RB | 21 | Agustiar Batubara |
| CB | 5 | (Cameroon) Henry Njombi Elad (c) |
| CB | 18 | Guntur Ariyadi |
| LB | 3 | Ahmad Zahrul Huda | (yellow card) 73' | (substituted off) 80' |
| CM | 8 | Amirul Mukminin |
| CM | 7 | Septariyanto |
| CM | 29 | Ana Supriatna |
| AM | 99 | (Liberia) Sackie Teah Doe |
| ST | 17 | (Cameroon) Bienvenue Nnengue |
| ST | 43 | Syaifullah Nazar | | (substituted off) 57' |
Substitutions:
| FW | 15 | Nehemia Solossa | (yellow card) 73' | (substituted on) 57' |
| MF | 2 | Andriyansyah | | (substituted on) 80' |
Coach:
Solehudin

Persebaya DU (Bhayangkara):
| GK | 23 | Tarcisius Ariesoma Krisandhi |
| RB | 2 | Imam Yulianto |
| CB | 6 | Muhammad Hamzah | (yellow card) 50' |
| CB | 25 | (Cameroon) M Al Hadji Adamdu |
| LB | 26 | Taufik Hasbuna |
| CM | 10 | Kabib Syukron |
| CM | 17 | Cucu Hidayat (c) | | (substituted off) 85' |
| CM | 28 | Wahyu Setiyanto |
| RF | 11 | Basuki |
| LF | 14 | Supaham | | (substituted off) 68' |
| CF | 32 | (Nigeria) Anoure Obiora Richard | (yellow card) 61' |
Substitutions:
| FW | 9 | (Nigeria) Charles Parker | | (substituted on) 68' |
| MF | 27 | Bayu Nugroho | | (substituted on) 85' |
Coach:
Freddy Mulli

Assistant referees:
Dadang Sutisna
Dadang Talani
Fourth official:
Sunardi

== West Sumbawa vs PSIM ==
26 June 2012
19:00

| West Sumbawa | 1 - 2 | PSIM |
|---|---|---|
| Teles 27' | Report | Zaenal 67'; Linkers 69' |

Mandala Krida Stadium, Yogyakarta
Attendance: 11,367
Referee: Suharto

| West Sumbawa | PSIM |

WEST SUMBAWA:
| GK | 1 | Khairul Iqbal Hasbala |
| RB | 23 | Miftakul Huda (c) |
| CB | 2 | (Cameroon) Kamdem Meys Martial | (yellow card) 76' |
| CB | 24 | Heru Setiawan |
| LB | 5 | Muhammad Erwin |
| RM | 19 | Andro Levandy | | (substituted off) 81' |
| CM | 16 | Asman Akman | | (substituted off) 70' |
| CM | 29 | Zamroni | (yellow card) 49' |
| LM | 99 | Rossy Noprihanis | (yellow card) 8' |
| ST | 17 | (Brazil) Antonio Teles |
| ST | 43 | Saddam Husain |
Substitutions:
| MF | 2 | Joni Suprianto | | (substituted on) 70' |
| FW | 15 | Feriansyah | | (substituted on) 81' |
Coach:
Mustaqim

PSIM:
| GK | 22 | Agung Prasetya |
| RB | 2 | Duslan Lestaluhu |
| CB | 15 | Abda Ali | | (substituted off) 62' |
| CB | 23 | Eko Pujiyanto | (yellow card) 85' |
| LB | 11 | Topas Pamungkas |
| DM | 16 | Eko Budi Santoso |
| DM | 32 | (Netherlands) Kristian Adelmund | | (substituted off) 17' |
| RW | 7 | Nova Zaenal (c) |
| AM | 35 | (Netherlands) Lorenzo Rimkus | | (substituted off) 57' |
| LW | 17 | Mochammad Irfan |
| CF | 99 | (Netherlands) Emile Linkers | (yellow card) 61' |
Substitutions:
| FW | 97 | Johan Arga Pramudya | | (substituted on) 17' |
| MF | 5 | Seto Nurdiyantara | | (substituted on) 57' |
| DF | 27 | Joni Sukirta | (yellow card) 81' | (substituted on) 62' |
Coach:
Hanafing

Assistant referees:
Sriguna Tarigan
Sutikno
Fourth official:
Najamuddin Aspiran

== Persebaya DU (Bhayangkara) vs PSIM ==
28 June 2012
15:15

| Persebaya DU (Bhayangkara) | 1 - 2 | PSIM |
|---|---|---|
| Obiora 37' (pen.) | Report | Lingkers 28' (pen.); Topas 32' |

Mandala Krida Stadium, Yogyakarta
Attendance: 8,973
Referee: Masril

| Persebaya DU (Bhayangkara) | PSIM |

Persebaya DU (Bhayangkara):
| GK | 1 | Thomas Rian | (yellow card) 31' |
| RB | 2 | Imam Yulianto |
| CB | 5 | Zainal Abidin | | (substituted off) 46' |
| CB | 6 | Muhammad Hamzah |
| LB | 26 | Taufik Hasbuna | | (substituted off) 43' |
| RM | 10 | Kabib Syukron |
| CM | 7 | Enjang Rohiman |
| CM | 17 | Cucu Hidayat (c) | (yellow card) 89' |
| LM | 28 | Wahyu Setiyanto | (yellow card) 61' |
| ST | 11 | Basuki | (yellow card) 67' | (substituted off) 71' |
| ST | 32 | (Nigeria) Anoure Obiora Richard |
Substitutions:
| FW | 9 | (Nigeria) Charles Parker | | (substituted on) 43' |
| DF | 25 | (Cameroon) M Al Hadji Adamdu | | (substituted on) 46' |
| FW | 29 | Jaenal Ichwan | | (substituted on) 71' |
Coach:
Yusuf Ekodono

PSIM:
| GK | 22 | Agung Prasetya | (yellow card) 70' |
| RB | 2 | Duslan Lestaluhu | (yellow card) 5' (yellow-red card) 35' |
| CB | 15 | Abda Ali |
| CB | 23 | Eko Pujiyanto |
| LB | 11 | Topas Pamungkas |
| RM | 35 | (Netherlands) Lorenzo Rimkus | | (substituted off) 46' |
| CM | 18 | M. Radikal Idealis | | (substituted off) 46' |
| CM | 7 | Nova Zaenal (c) |
| LM | 17 | Mochammad Irfan |
| ST | 97 | Johan Arga Pramudya | (yellow card) 84' |
| ST | 99 | (Netherlands) Emile Linkers | | (substituted off) 79' |
Substitutions:
| DF | 25 | Dean Fauzi Firdaus | | (substituted on) 46' |
| MF | 5 | Seto Nurdiyantara | | (substituted on) 46' |
| FW | 12 | Lukman Salan | | (substituted on) 79' |
Coach:
Hanafing

Assistant referees:
Sutikno
Sriguna Tarigan
Fourth official:
Najamuddin Aspiran

== Barito Putera vs West Sumbawa ==
28 June 2012
19:00

| Barito Putera | 1 - 1 | West Sumbawa |
|---|---|---|
| Solossa 57' | Report | Saddam 29' |

Mandala Krida Stadium, Yogyakarta
Attendance: 1,539
Referee: Sunardi

| Barito Putera | West Sumbawa |

BARITO PUTERA:
| GK | 27 | Dedy Sutanto |
| RB | 21 | Agustiar Batubara |
| CB | 5 | (Cameroon) Henry Njombi Elad (c) |
| CB | 18 | Guntur Ariyadi |
| LB | 2 | Andriyansyah | (yellow card) 89' |
| CM | 7 | Septariyanto | | (substituted off) 89' |
| CM | 8 | Amirul Mukminin |
| CM | 29 | Ana Supriatna | (yellow card) 42' | (substituted off) 73' |
| AM | 99 | (Liberia) Sackie Teah Doe | (yellow card) 67' |
| ST | 17 | (Cameroon) Bienvenue Nnengue |
| ST | 43 | Syaifullah Nazar | | (substituted off) 54' |
Substitutions:
| FW | 15 | Nehemia Solossa | | (substituted on) 54' |
| MF | 10 | Sartibi Darwis | | (substituted on) 73' |
| FW | 80 | Satyo Husodo | | (substituted on) 89' |
Coach:
Solehudin

WEST SUMBAWA:
| GK | 1 | Khairul Iqbal Hasbala |
| RB | 23 | Miftakul Huda (c) |
| CB | 15 | Ahmad Assa Nurcahya |
| CB | 24 | Heru Setiawan | (yellow card) 76' |
| LB | 5 | Muhammad Erwin |
| RM | 19 | Andro Levandy |
| CM | 14 | Robi Susanto | | (substituted off) 73' |
| CM | 26 | Marwansyah | | (substituted off) 68' |
| LM | 17 | Rossy Noprihanis |
| ST | 28 | (Brazil) Antonio Teles |
| ST | 9 | Saddam Husain |
Substitutions:
| MF | 25 | (Morocco) Ali Tallouk | | (substituted on) 68' |
| MF | 16 | Asman Akman | | (substituted on) 73' |
Coach:
Mustaqim

Assistant referees:
Dadang Sutisna
Dwi Wiratmono
Fourth official:
Suharto

== West Sumbawa vs Persebaya DU (Bhayangkara) ==
1 July 2012
15:15

| West Sumbawa | 0 - 2 | Persebaya DU (Bhayangkara) |
|---|---|---|
| | Report | Supaham 33'; Obiora 57' (pen.) |

U.N.Y Stadium, Yogyakarta
Attendance: 100

| West Sumbawa | Persebaya DU (Bhayangkara) |

== PSIM vs Barito Putera ==
1 July 2012
15:15

| PSIM | 1 - 0 | Barito Putera |
|---|---|---|
| Irfan 63' | Report |

Mandala Krida Stadium, Yogyakarta
Attendance: 10,765

| PSIM | Barito Putera |
