= 2011–12 Liga Indonesia Premier Division second round Group A =

Group A of 2011-12 Liga Indonesia Premier Division second round was played from 25 to 30 June 2012. The pool was made up of co-host Persepam Pamekasan, Persita Tangerang, Persiku Kudus and PSBK Blitar.

== Standings ==
Key to colours in group tables
Team progressed to the semi-finals

Team	Pld	W	D	L	GF	GA	GD	Pts
Persepam Madura United	3	2	0	1	3	3	0	6
Persita Tangerang	3	1	2	0	5	3	+2	5
PSBK Blitar	3	1	1	1	4	3	+1	4
Persiku Kudus	3	0	1	2	2	5	−3	1

All times local (WIB)

== Persita vs Persepam ==
25 June 2012
15:30

Persita	2 - 0	Persepam
Ade Jantra 49'; Carrasco 81'	Report

Gelora Delta Stadium, Sidoarjo
Attendance: 1,500

Persita	Persepam

PERSITA:
GK	28	Tema Mursadat
RB	26	Rizky Rizal Ripora
CB	3	(Chile) Luis Edmundo (c)
CB	45	Dominggus Fakdawer
LB	16	Rio Ramandika
RM	7	Ade Jantra Lukmana
CM	23	Maman	(yellow card) 64'
LM	27	Andy Dwi Kurniawan
RF	13	Hendra Bastian		(substituted off) 62'
CF	99	(Chile) Cristian Carrasco		(substituted off) 89'
LF	32	Muhammad Agus Salim	(yellow card) 69'	(substituted off) 75'
Substitutions:
MF	6	Junaidi		(substituted in) 62'
FW	17	Rishadi Fauzi		(substituted in) 75'
MF	51	Lingga Ashadi		(substituted in) 89'
Coach:
Elly Idris

PERSEPAM:
GK	1	Alfonsius Kelvan
RB	3	Khokok Roniarto		(substituted off) 86'
CB	4	Barkah Crustianhadi
CB	5	(Cameroon) Mohamadou Tassiou Bako (c)
LB	20	Surono	(yellow card) 22'	(substituted off) 53'
RM	9	Indriyanto Setyo Nugroho
CM	7	Ishak Y.M. Djober
CM	18	Mohammad Anshorudin		(substituted off) 72'
LM	21	M. Rudy Hermawan Suhartoyo
ST	10	(Cameroon) Martial Poungoue Nz
ST	11	Sudirman
Substitutions:
DF	6	Yoga Spria Mirshadaq		(substituted in) 53'
MF	29	Muhammad Kusen		(substituted in) 72'
MF	16	Nur Huda		(substituted in) 86'
Coach:
Winedi Purwito

Man of the Match:

Assistant referees:

Fourth official:

== Persiku vs PSBK ==
25 June 2012
19:00

Persiku	0 - 2	PSBK
	Report	Somah 47', 90+4' (pen.)

Gelora Delta Stadium, Sidoarjo
Attendance: 535
Referee: Thoriq Alkatiri

Persiku	PSBK

PERSIKU:
GK	89	Dedi Heryanto
RB	5	Danial	(yellow card) 73'
CB	20	Junedi	(yellow card) 28'	(substituted off) 82'
CB	27	Murwanto (c)		(substituted off) 57'
LB	30	Heru Kuswanto
RM	7	Dodon Kuncahyo	(yellow card) 90+3'
CM	23	M. Widya Wahyu Fitriyanto
CM	24	(Chile) Alejandro A. Tobar
LM	77	Merdiyanto Welong	(yellow card) 83'
ST	13	Agus Santiko
ST	22	(Liberia) Peter Moukouri Kuoh
Substitutions:
FW	19	Voller Ortega	(yellow card) 90+3'	(substituted in) 57'
DF	85	Ardhy		(substituted in) 82'
Coach:
Riono Asnan

PSBK:
GK	16	Muhammad Juni Irawan	(yellow card) 90'
RB	27	Zainuri
CB	5	Fendi Taris
CB	22	(Liberia) George Dakar Mitchell	(yellow card) 58'
LB	11	Suharno
RM	17	M. Rokip
CM	12	Hariyanto
CM	41	Fachmi Amiruddin	(yellow card) 63'	(substituted off) 90'
LM	2	La Umbu
ST	99	(Liberia) Ferry Somah (c)
ST	15	Fandy Achmad L		(substituted off) 87'
Substitutions:
MF	28	Sigit Oktarianto		(substituted in) 87'
MF	18	Rachmad Wahyudi		(substituted in) 90'
Coach:
Nus Yadera

Man of the Match:

Assistant referees:

Fourth official:

== Persita vs Persiku ==
27 June 2012
15:30

Persita	2 - 2	Persiku
Carrasco 46', 53'	Report	Santiko 6', 85'

Gelora Delta Stadium, Sidoarjo
Attendance: 265

Persita	Persiku

PERSITA:
GK	28	Tema Mursadat
RB	26	Rizky Rizal Ripora
CB	3	(Chile) Luis Edmundo (c)	(yellow card) 5'
CB	45	Dominggus Fakdawer
LB	16	Rio Ramandika	(yellow card) 21'
RM	13	Hendra Bastian		(substituted off) 79'
CM	27	Andy Dwi Kurniawan
CM	51	Lingga Ashadi
LM	7	Ade Jantra Lukmana
SS	10	(Argentina) Leonardo Adrian Veron
ST	99	(Chile) Cristian Carrasco
Substitutions:
MF	6	Junaidi		(substituted in) 79'
Coach:
Elly Idris

PERSIKU:
GK	91	Prahita Dian		(substituted off) 20'
RB	3	Munadi
CB	27	Murwanto (c)
CB	35	(Nigeria) Onyekachukwu Aloso		(substituted off) 57'
LB	85	Ardhy		(substituted off) 74'
RM	19	Voller Ortega	(yellow card) 71'
CM	23	M. Widya Wahyu Fitriyanto
CM	24	(Chile) Alejandro A. Tobar
LM	77	Merdiyanto Welong	(yellow card) 13'
ST	13	Agus Santiko
ST	22	(Liberia) Peter Moukouri Kuoh
Substitutions:
GK	26	Aditya Fajar Haribowo		(substituted in) 20'
MF	28	Muhammad Edris		(substituted in) 57'
MF	11	Sugeng Riyadi		(substituted in) 74'
Coach:
Riono Asnan

Man of the Match:

Assistant referees:

Fourth official:

== Persepam vs PSBK ==
27 June 2012
19:00

Persepam	2 - 1	PSBK
Poungoue 27', 35'	Report	Dakar 68'

Gelora Delta Stadium, Sidoarjo
Attendance: 4,385

Persepam	PSBK

PERSEPAM:
GK	1	Alfonsius Kelvan	(yellow card) 89'
RB	3	Khokok Roniarto
CB	4	Barkah Crustianhadi
CB	5	(Cameroon) Mohamadou Tassiou Bako (c)	(yellow card) 32'
LB	6	Yoga Spria Mirshadaq
RM	9	Indriyanto Setyo Nugroho		(substituted off) 83'
CM	8	(Brazil) Evandro
CM	21	M. Rudy Hermawan Suhartoyo
LM	7	Ishak Y.M. Djober	(yellow card) 49'
ST	10	(Cameroon) Martial Poungoue Nz	(yellow card) 57'
ST	11	Sudirman
Substitutions:
MF	29	Muhammad Kusen		(substituted in) 83'
Coach:
Winedi Purwito

PSBK:
GK	16	Muhammad Juni Irawan
RB	27	Zainuri	(yellow card) 49' (yellow-red card) 78'
CB	5	Fendi Taris
CB	22	(Liberia) George Dakar Mitchell
CB	11	Suharno
LB	17	M. Rokip
CM	2	La Umbu
CM	12	Hariyanto
CM	41	Fachmi Amiruddin (c)		(substituted off) 90+1'
ST	9	Yoni Wahyudi		(substituted off) 35'
ST	15	Fandy Achmad L		(substituted off) 85'
Substitutions:
FW	99	(Liberia) Ferry Somah		(substituted in) 35'
FW	10	(Liberia) Alfred Gobeh Ballah		(substituted in) 85'
MF	28	Sigit Oktarianto		(substituted in) 90+1'
Coach:
Nus Yadera

Man of the Match:

Assistant referees:

Fourth official:

== Persiku vs Persepam ==
30 June 2012
17:00

Persiku	0 - 1	Persepam
	Report	Husen 55'

Gelora Delta Stadium, Sidoarjo
Attendance: 7,345

PSBK	Persita

== PSBK vs Persita ==
30 June 2012
17:00

PSBK	1 - 1	Persita
Fandhy 81'	Report	Junaidi 86'

Surajaya Stadium, Lamongan
Attendance: 117

Persiku	Persepam
