= 2007 Copa Indonesia =

2007–08 Copa Indonesia
Copa Dji Sam Soe 2007

Tournament details
- Country: Indonesia
- Teams: 92 (4 Zone)

Final positions
- Champions: Sriwijaya FC
- Runners-up: Persipura Jayapura

Tournament statistics
- Top goal scorer: Beto Gonçalves (6 goals)

The 2007–08 Copa Indonesia was the third edition of Piala Indonesia, the nationwide football cup tournament in Indonesia. Arema Malang was the tournament's defending champions.

Sriwijaya became champions after a victory over Persipura Jayapura in the final match at Jakarta.

== Format Competition ==
Played in 4 zones, each with 23 clubs, of which 9 have a bye to the first round proper while the other 14 enter the qualifying round, which is played over 1 leg.

== Qualifying Round ==
=== Zone 1 ===
Persibut Bungo Tebo	3–0	PSBL Bandar Lampung
PS Asahan	2–3	PSKPS Padang Sidempuan
PSAP Sigli	1–0	PSP Padang
PSBL Langsa	2–0	PSLS Lhokseumawe
Persires Rengat	0–1	Persih Tembilahan
PS Penajam Medan Jaya	2–3	PS Palembang
PSBS Bangkinang	4–3 aet	PSPS Pekanbaru

=== Zone 2 ===
PSISra Sragen	1–3	PSIR Rembang
Pesik Kuningan	0–3	Persikab Bandung
Persipasi Bekasi	1–0	Pro Duta SA Bandung
Persikad Depok	1–0 aet	Persiku Kudus
PS Krakatau Steel Cilegon	0–1	Perserang Serang
PSB Bogor	2–0	Persipur Purwodadi
Persik Kendal	1-0	Persibat Batang

=== Zone 3 ===
Persedikab Kediri	0–0 (2-4 pen)	Persibo Bojonegoro
Persida Sidoarjo	1–2	Gresik United
PPSM Sakti Magelang	1–0	Persebi Boyolali
Persewangi Banyuwangi	1–0	Persid Jember
Persipon Pontianak	3–0	PS Mojokerto Putra
Perst Tabanan	2–0	Persipro Probolinggo
Persiba Bantul	w/o	Persepar Palangkaraya

=== Zone 4 ===
Perssin Sinjai	w/o	Persipal Palu
Mitra Kukar	1–0	Persekaba Yahukimo
Persemalra Tual	w/o	Persim Maros
Persipare Parepare	1–0	Persidago Gorontalo
Gaspa Palopo	w/o	Persisam Putra Samarinda
Persitoli Tolikara	1–4	Persidafon Dafonsoro
Persido Donggala	2-1	Persigo Gorontalo

== First Round ==
=== Zone 1 ===
Team 1	Agg.	Team 2	1st leg	2nd leg
Semen Padang FC	6 – 2	PSKPS Padang Sidempuan	5 – 0	1 – 2
PSAP Sigli	4 – 3	Persiraja Banda Aceh	3 – 0	1 – 3
Persikota Tangerang	1 – 3	PSBL Langsa	0 – 0	1 – 3
PSSB Bireuen	6 – 1	Persih Tembilahan	5 – 1	1 – 0
Sriwijaya FC	5 – 4	PS Palembang	3 – 3	2 – 1
Persita Tangerang	3 – 3(a)	Persitara Jakarta Utara	1 – 0	2 – 3
PSBS Bangkinang	0 – 7	PSDS Deli Serdang	0 – 1	0 – 6
PSMS Medan	2 – 0	Persibut Bungo Tebo	2 – 0	0 – 0

=== Zone 2 ===
Team 1	Agg.	Team 2	1st leg	2nd leg
PSIS Semarang	1 – 0	Persikab Bandung	1 – 0	0 – 0
PSB Bogor	1 – 3	Persijap Jepara	0 – 0	1 – 3
PSIM Yogyakarta	3 – 3 (4-5 pen)	Persipasi Bekasi	2 – 1	1 – 2
PSS Sleman	4 – 3	Persikad Depok	2 – 1	2 – 2
Pelita Jaya Purwakarta	2 – 1	Perserang Serang	1 – 0	1 – 1
Persija Jakarta	3 – 0	PSIR Rembang	2 – 0	1 – 0
Persikabo Bogor	1 - 1 (3-4 pen)	Persis Solo	0 – 0	1 – 1 (aet)
Persib Bandung	3 – 1	Persik Kendal	3 – 0	0 – 1

=== Zone 3 ===
Team 1	Agg.	Team 2	1st leg	2nd leg
Persik Kediri	3 – 3(a)	Persibo Bojonegoro	2 – 2	1 – 1
Arema Malang	3 – 3 (6-5 pen)	Persiba Bantul	2 – 1	1 – 2
Deltras Sidoarjo	3 – 2 aet	Persegi Bali F.C.	1 – 1	2 – 1
Persebaya Surabaya	1 – 0	Persema Malang	1 – 0	0 – 0
Gresik United	3 – 0	PPSM Sakti Magelang	1 – 0	2 – 0
Persela Lamongan	1 – 2	Persekabpas Pasuruan	1 – 0	0 – 2
PKT Bontang	8 - 3	Persewangi Banyuwangi	6 – 0	2 – 3
Persipon Pontianak	5 – 3	Perst Tabanan	3 – 0	2 – 3

=== Zone 4 ===
Team 1	Agg.	Team 2	1st leg	2nd leg
Persemalra Tual	withdrew	Persma Manado	–	–
Persipare Parepare	0 – 4	Persiba Balikpapan	0 – 1	0 – 3
Persibom Kotamobagu	2 – 4	Mitra Kukar	2 – 0	0 – 4
Persmin Minahasa	0 – 2	Persidafon Dafonsoro	0 – 0	0 – 2
Persiter Ternate	2 – 2(a)	Persiwa Wamena	2 – 1	0 – 1
PSM Makassar	4 – 2	Perssin Sinjai	3 – 0	1 – 2
Persipura Jayapura	11 – 1	Persido Donggala	7 – 0	4 – 1
Gaspa Palopo	1 – 5	Perseman Manokwari	1 – 2	0 – 3

== Second Round ==
=== Zone 1 ===
Team 1	Agg.	Team 2	1st leg	2nd leg
PSAP Sigli	3 – 2	PSBL Langsa	3 – 1	0 – 1
PSSB Bireuen	0 – 4	Sriwijaya FC	0 – 0	0 – 4
PSMS Medan	3 – 1	Semen Padang FC	1 – 1	2 – 0
Persita Tangerang	2 – 1	PSDS Deli Serdang	2 – 0	0 – 1

=== Zone 2 ===
Team 1	Agg.	Team 2	1st leg	2nd leg
Persis Solo	1 – 0	Persipasi Bekasi	0 – 0	1 – 0
Persija Jakarta	2 – 1	PSIS Semarang	1 – 0	1 – 1
PSS Sleman	0 – 4	Pelita Jaya Purwakarta	0 – 3	0 – 1
Persijap Jepara	0 – 0 (4-3 pen)	Persib Bandung	0 – 0	0 – 0

=== Zone 3 ===
Team 1	Agg.	Team 2	1st leg	2nd leg
Persebaya Surabaya	1 – 1(a)	Deltras Sidoarjo	1 – 1	0 – 0
Persibo Bojonegoro	2 – 3	Gresik United	1 – 0	1 – 3
Persekabpas Pasuruan	1 – 0	Arema Malang	1 – 0	0 – 0
PKT Bontang	2 – 1	Persipon Pontianak	0 – 0	2 – 1

=== Zone 4 ===
Team 1	Agg.	Team 2	1st leg	2nd leg
Mitra Kukar	3 – 3(a)	Persemalra Tual	3 – 1	0 – 2
PSM Makassar	4 – 3	Persiwa Wamena	3 – 1	1 – 2
Persiba Balikpapan	2 – 2(a)	Perseman Manokwari	2 – 1	0 – 1
Persidafon Dafonsoro	0 – 2	Persipura Jayapura	0 – 0	0 – 2

== Knockout Stage ==
=== 1/8 Finals ===
Team 1	Agg.	Team 2	1st leg	2nd leg
Persijap Jepara	2 – 3	Pelita Jaya Purwakarta	1 – 0	1 – 3
Persis Solo	1 – 2	Persita Tangerang	0 – 0	1 – 2
Perseman Manokwari	1 – 5	Sriwijaya FC	1 – 2	0 – 3 (wo)
PSMS Medan	5 – 0	Gresik United	4 – 0	1 – 0
Persipura Jayapura	5 – 1	Persemalra Tual	4 – 0	1 – 1
PKT Bontang	2 – 6	Deltras Sidoarjo	1 – 3	1 – 3
PSAP Sigli	4 – 5	Persekabpas Pasuruan	2 – 2	2 – 3
Persija Jakarta	2 – 1	PSM Makassar	2 – 0	0 – 1

=== Quarterfinals ===
Team 1	Agg.	Team 2	1st leg	2nd leg
Persekabpas Pasuruan	2 – 5	Persipura Jayapura	2 – 2	0 – 3
Deltras Sidoarjo	1 – 3	Persija Jakarta	1 – 1	0 – 2
Persita Tangerang	1 – 2	Pelita Jaya Purwakarta	1 – 0	0 – 2
PSMS Medan	2 – 4	Sriwijaya FC	2 – 0	0 – 4 (a.e.t)

== Finals Stage ==
=== Semifinals ===
10 January 2008
15.30 WIB

Persipura Jayapura	3 – 2	Persija Jakarta
30', 45', 54' Beto Goncalves		27' Bambang Pamungkas; 64' Hamka Hamzah

Gelora Bung Karno Stadium, Jakarta
10 January 2008
19:30 WIB

Pelita Jaya Purwakarta	0–0 (a.e.t.)	Sriwijaya FC
	Report
Penalties
C. Lopez (penalty scored); A. Aras (penalty missed); Dian Agus (penalty scored); A. Batubara (penalty scored); J. Mulyana (penalty scored); Tommy Rifka (penalty scored); V. Luís (penalty missed)	5–6	(penalty scored) Gumbs; (penalty scored) C. Yulianto; (penalty scored) Zah Rahan; (penalty scored) Carlos Renato; (penalty missed) Lenglolo; (penalty scored) Tony Sucipto; (penalty scored) Warobay

Gelora Bung Karno Stadium, Jakarta

=== Third Place Match ===
13 January 2008
15.30 WIB

Persija Jakarta	2 – 1	Pelita Jaya Purwakarta
32' Aliyudin; 78' Rubén Cecco	Report	56' Adolfo Souza

Gelora Bung Karno Stadium, Jakarta

=== Grand Final ===
13 January 2008
19:30 WIB

Persipura Jayapura	1–1 (a.e.t.)	Sriwijaya FC
Jeremiah 6'	Report	Gumbs 73'
Penalties
Ivakdalam (penalty missed); David da Rocha (penalty missed); Beto (penalty missed)	0–3	(penalty scored) Gumbs; (penalty scored) Zah Rahan; (penalty missed) Tony Sucipto; (penalty scored) Obiora

Gelora Bung Karno Stadium, Jakarta
Attendance: 25,000
Referee: Jimmy Napitupulu

== Awards ==
Fair Play Team:
Pelita Jaya Purwakarta

Topskor:
(Brazil) Beto Goncalves (Persipura Jayapura) 6 Gol

Best Player:
(Indonesia) Bambang Pamungkas (Persija Jakarta)
