= Ariyanto =

Ariyanto is an Indonesian name. Notable people with the name include:

- Arif Ariyanto (born 1985), Indonesian footballer
- David Ariyanto (born 1987), Indonesian footballer
- Didik Ariyanto (born 1991), Indonesian footballer
