= Mohamed Hamzah (disambiguation) =

Mohamed Hamzah may refer to:

- Mohamed Hamzah (1918–1993), Malaysian vexillographer
- Mohamed Hamza (born 2000), Egyptian fencer
- Muhammad Hamzah (born 1986), Indonesian footballer
- Muhammad Hamza (1929-2021), Pakistani politician
