= Fernando Cárdenas =

Fernando Cárdenas may refer to:

- Fernando Cárdenas (Colombian footballer) (born 1988)
- Fernando Cárdenas (Chilean footballer) (born 1975)
- Fernando Cárdenas (politician), Governor of Yucatán State, Mexico from 1935 to 1936
