= Adelmund =

Adelmund is a surname. Notable people with the surname include:

- Karin Adelmund (1949–2005), Dutch politician and trade union leader
- Kristian Adelmund (born 1987), Dutch footballer
