= Ferdiansyah =

Ferdiansyah may refer to:

- Ferdiansyah (footballer, born 1983), Indonesian association football player
- Ferdiansyah (footballer, born 2000), Indonesian association football player
