= Batubara =

Batubara is an Indonesian name. Notable people with the surname include:

- Agustiar Batubara (born 1978), Indonesian footballer
- Cosmas Batubara (1938–2019), Indonesian politician
- Juliari Batubara (born 1972), Indonesian politician
