= Amirul Mukminin =

Indonesian footballer

Personal information
- Full name: Amirul Mukminin
- Date of birth: 6 August 1984 (age 42)
- Place of birth: Palembang, Indonesia
- Height: 1.65 m (5 ft 5 in)
- Position: Attacking midfielder

Team information
- Current team: Adhyaksa Bekasi (Assistant coach)

Senior career*
Years	Team	Apps	(Gls)
2005–2006	PS Palembang	13	(0)
2007–2010	Sriwijaya	85	(6)
2010–2017	Barito Putera	129	(12)
2018–2019	Martapura	45	(3)
2020–2021	Muba Babel United	11	(1)
2022–2024	Sriwijaya	9	(1)
Total		292	(23)

International career
2014	Indonesia	1	(0)

Managerial career
- 2024: Sriwijaya (Assistant coach)
- 2025: Sriwijaya (caretaker)
- 2025: Sriwijaya (Assistant coach)
- 2025: KMP Bumara (Technical director)
- 2025–2026: Sumsel United (Assistant coach)
- 2026–: Adhyaksa Bekasi (Assistant coach)
- * Club domestic league appearances and goals

Amirul Mukminin (born 6 August 1984) is an Indonesian former footballer who plays as an attacking midfielder.

== Club career ==
=== Martapura FC ===
In 2018, Amirul signed a contract with Indonesian Liga 2 club Martapura. He made 45 league appearances and scored 3 goals for Martapura.

=== Muba Babel United ===
He was signed for Muba Babel United to play in Liga 2 in the 2020 season. This season was suspended on 27 March 2020 due to the COVID-19 pandemic. The season was abandoned and was declared void on 20 January 2021.

== International career ==
=== National team ===
Indonesia national team
Year	Apps	Goals
2014	1	0
Total	1	0

== Honours ==
Sriwijaya

- Liga Indonesia Premier Division: 2007–08
- Piala Indonesia: 2007, 2008–09, 2010

Barito Putera

- Liga Indonesia Premier Division: 2011–12
