= Arthur Frets Assa =

Indonesian footballer

Arthur Assa
Personal information
- Full name: Arthur Frets Assa
- Date of birth: 6 January 1984 (age 42)
- Place of birth: Manado, North Sulawesi, Indonesia
- Height: 1.68 m (5 ft 6 in)
- Position: Left back

Senior career*
Years	Team	Apps	(Gls)
2007	Mojokerto Putra	6	(1)
2008	Persih Tembilahan	8	(0)
2008–2009	Persekabpas Pasuruan	15	(2)
2009–2010	Deltras Sidoarjo	12	(0)
2010–2011	PPSM Magelang	12	(0)
2011–2012	Gresik United	5	(0)
2013–2014	Deltras Sidoarjo	16	(0)
2014–2016	PS Badung	11	(2)
- * Club domestic league appearances and goals

Arthur Frets Assa (born 6 January 1984 in Manado, North Sulawesi) is an Indonesian former footballer.
