= Yogi Triana =

Indonesian footballer

Personal information
- Full name: Yogi Triana
- Date of birth: 5 July 1994 (age 32)
- Place of birth: Bogor, Indonesia
- Height: 1.89 m (6 ft 2 in)
- Position: Goalkeeper

Youth career
- 2011–2012: Pelita Jaya

Senior career*
Years	Team	Apps	(Gls)
2013–2014	Persita Tangerang	20	(0)
2015–2016	Sriwijaya	9	(0)
2017–2021	Persita Tangerang	57	(0)
2021	Perserang Serang	2	(0)
2022	Bekasi City	7	(0)
2023–2024	Persela Lamongan	3	(0)
2024–2025	Persipa Pati	8	(0)
- * Club domestic league appearances and goals as of 01:02, 25 February 2025 (UTC)

Yogi Triana (born 5 July 1994) is an Indonesian professional footballer who plays as a goalkeeper.

== Club career ==
=== Persita Tangerang ===
In 2013, Yogi signed a year contract with Persita Tangerang to play in the Indonesia Super League. He made his league debut on 31 January 2013 by starting in a 4–0 loss against Persidafon Dafonsoro.

=== Sriwijaya FC ===
On November 12, 2014, he moved to Sriwijaya.

=== Return to Persita Tangerang ===
In 2017, Yogi decided to re-join former club Persita Tangerang, signing a one-year contract with Persita from Sriwijaya to play in Liga 2.

=== Perserang Serang ===
On 18 June 2021, Yogi joined Perserang Serang from Persita Tangerang to play in 2021-22 Liga 2, he was contracted for one year with his friend while still in Persita, Egi Melgiansyah, Rio Ramandika and Henry Rivaldi. He made his league debut on 27 September by starting in a 2–1 win against PSKC Cimahi.

== Honours ==
=== Club ===
Persita Tangerang

- Liga 2 runner-up: 2019
