= Ferdiansyah (footballer, born 2000) =

Indonesian association football player

Personal information
- Full name: Ferdiansyah
- Date of birth: 24 April 2000 (age 26)
- Place of birth: Jakarta, Indonesia
- Height: 1.67 m (5 ft 6 in)
- Positions: Midfielder; right-back

Team information
- Current team: Barito Putera
- Number: 17

Youth career
- 2014–2015: SSB Bina Taruna
- 2015–2016: Jakarta Timur FC
- 2017: Bhayangkara
- 2018: Barito Putera

Senior career*
Years	Team	Apps	(Gls)
2019–	Barito Putera	92	(5)

International career
2014–2015	Indonesia U16		
- * Club domestic league appearances and goals as of 3 May 2026

Ferdiansyah (born on 24 April 2000) is an Indonesian professional footballer who plays as a midfielder or right-back for Liga 2 club Barito Putera.

== Club career ==
=== Barito Putera ===
Ferdiansyah made his debut in the Liga 1 for Barito Putera on 22 June 2019, in a 2–1 defeat to Kalteng Putra. He ended the 2019 season with 19 appearances.

== Career statistics ==
=== Club ===
As of 3 May 2026

Club	Season	League		Cup		Continental		Other		Total	
Club	Season	Apps	Goals	Apps	Goals	Apps	Goals	Apps	Goals	Apps	Goals
Barito Putera	2019	19	0	0	0	0	0	0	0	19	0
Barito Putera	2020	3	0	0	0	0	0	0	0	3	0
Barito Putera	2021–22	12	0	0	0	0	0	2 (Note: Appearances in Menpora Cup)	0	16	0
Barito Putera	2022–23	30	0	0	0	0	0	5 (Note: Appearances in Indonesia President's Cup)	0	35	0
Barito Putera	2023–24	4	0	0	0	0	0	0	0	4	0
Barito Putera	2024–25	6	0	0	0	–		0	0	6	0
Barito Putera	2025–26	18	5	0	0	–		0	0	18	5
Career total		92	5	0	0	0	0	7	0	99	5
