= Fernando Cárdenas (Chilean footballer) =

Chilean footballer (born 1975)

Personal information
- Full name: Fernando René Cárdenas Villafaña
- Date of birth: 20 March 1975 (age 51)
- Place of birth: Coquimbo, Chile
- Position: Midfielder

Youth career
- Coquimbo Unido

Senior career*
Years	Team	Apps	(Gls)
1994–1998	Coquimbo Unido	63	(2)
1999	Palestino	34	(2)
2000	Unión Española	16	(0)
2001	Coquimbo Unido	3	(0)
2005	Perseden Denpasar		(2)
2006	Persim Maros		(8)
- * Club domestic league appearances and goals

Fernando René Cárdenas Villafaña (born 20 March 1975), also known as Fernando Rene in Indonesia, is a Chilean former professional footballer who played as a midfielder for clubs in Chile and Indonesia.

== Career ==
Cárdenas is better known by his career in Coquimbo Unido in the Chilean Primera División from 1994 to 1998 and 2001.

In Chile, he also played for Palestino (1999) and Unión Española (2000) in the top division.

Abroad, he played in Indonesia for clubs such as Perseden Denpasar (2005) and Persim Maros (2006), where also played his compatriot Cristian Carrasco and scored eight goals.

== Personal life ==
He lived in Bali, Indonesia, for nine years.

His mother, Lucía Villafaña, was honored as an important fan of Coquimbo Unido.
