= Muhammad Kusen =

Indonesian footballer

M. Kusen
Personal information
- Full name: Muhammad Kusen
- Date of birth: 6 April 1977 (age 49)
- Place of birth: Indonesia
- Height: 1.70 m (5 ft 7 in)
- Position: Defender

Senior career*
Years	Team	Apps	(Gls)
2007–2010	Deltras Sidoarjo	38	(3)
2008	→ Gresik United (loan)	7	(0)
2010–2011	Bhayangkara F.C.	18	(1)
2011–2014	Gresik United	32	(0)
Total		95	(1)
- * Club domestic league appearances and goals

Muhammad Kusen (born 6 April 1977) is an Indonesian former footballer.

== Honours ==
Deltras Sidoarjo

- Liga Indonesia Premier Division runner up: 2009–10
