= Indriyanto Nugroho =

Indonesian footballer

Personal information
- Full name: Indriyanto Setyo Adi Nugroho
- Date of birth: 14 September 1976 (age 50)
- Place of birth: Sukoharjo, Indonesia
- Height: 1.73 m (5 ft 8 in)
- Position: Striker

Senior career*
Years	Team	Apps	(Gls)
2001	Pelita Jaya		
2002	Persijatim		
2003–2007	PSIS Semarang		
2008	Persiba Bantul		
2009	Persik Kediri		
2009–2010	Persih Tembilahan		
2010	Persekaba Blora		
2010–2011	PSIS Semarang	??	(1)
2011–2013	Persepam Pamekasan	??	(4)

International career
1994–1995	Indonesia primavera		
1995–1996	Indonesia	5	(3)

Managerial career
- 2019–2023: Indonesia U-16 (Assistant coach)
- 2024: ASIOP F.C.
- * Club domestic league appearances and goals

Indriyanto Nugroho (born 14 September 1976) is a retired Indonesian footballer who plays as striker for Persepam Pamekasan and the Indonesia national team in the 1996 AFC Asian Cup. Besides Indonesia, he has played in Italy.

== Honours ==
PSIS Semarang

- Liga Indonesia Premier Division runner up: 2006
