= Dedi Haryanto =

Indonesian footballer

Personal information
- Full name: Dedi Haryanto
- Date of birth: 25 November 1988 (age 37)
- Place of birth: Batang, Indonesia
- Height: 1.84 m (6 ft 0 in)
- Position: Goalkeeper

Youth career
- 2003–2004: Persibat Batang
- 2007–2008: Persib U-21

Senior career*
Years	Team	Apps	(Gls)
2008–2009	Persib Bandung	12	(0)
2009–2010	PSBI Blitar	14	(0)
2010–2011	Persiku Kudus	28	(0)
2011–2012	PSIR Rembang	23	(0)
2013	Persijap Jepara	32	(0)
2014	Persikabo Bogor	7	(0)
2014–2015	Ponta Leste	11	(0)
2015	Aitana	8	(0)
2015–2016	Porto Taibesse	5	(0)
2016–2018	Persiba Balikpapan	24	(0)
2017	→ Persatu Tuban (loan)	3	(0)
2017–2018	→ Martapura (loan)	6	(0)
2018–2019	PSGC Ciamis	2	(0)
2019–2021	PSBS Biak	10	(0)
2022	Persipura Jayapura	3	(0)
- * Club domestic league appearances and goals as of 10 September 2022

Dedi Heryanto (born 25 November 1988) is an Indonesian professional footballer who plays as a goalkeeper.

== Career ==
=== Persijap Jepara ===
He moved from PSIR Rembang to Persijap Jepara in January 2013.
