= Alfonsius Kelvan =

Indonesian footballer

Personal information
- Full name: Alfonsius Kelvan
- Date of birth: 21 June 1989 (age 37)
- Place of birth: Jakarta, Indonesia
- Height: 1.76 m (5 ft 9 1/2 in)
- Position: Goalkeeper

Senior career*
Years	Team	Apps	(Gls)
2010–2013	Madura Utama	50	(0)
2014–2015	Pelita Bandung Raya	0	(0)
2016–2017	Persiba Balikpapan	19	(0)
2017	Bali United	1	(0)
2017–2018	Persebaya Surabaya	1	(0)
2019	Borneo	2	(0)
2019	PSMS Medan	14	(0)
2020	Persela Lamongan	1	(0)
- * Club domestic league appearances and goals as of 23:19, 14 November 2019 (UTC)

Alfonsius Kelvan (born June 21, 1989) is an Indonesian footballer as a goalkeeper.

== Career ==
=== 2013 ===
On 9 December 2013, he signed a one-year contract with Pelita Bandung Raya.

=== 2016 ===
In 2016, Alfonsius joined Persiba Balikpapan in the 2016 Indonesia Soccer Championship A.

=== 2017 ===
In 2017 he signed a one-year contract with Bali United F.C. for a match 2017 Liga 1.

== Personal life ==
Kelvan converted to Islam in December 2010.
