= Septariyanto =

Indonesian footballer

Personal information
- Full name: Septariyanto
- Date of birth: 1 September 1982 (age 44)
- Place of birth: Muara Enim, Indonesia
- Height: 1.68 m (5 ft 6 in)
- Position: Midfielder

Senior career*
Years	Team	Apps	(Gls)
2010–2013	Barito Putera	6	(0)
2013–2014	Sriwijaya	17	(0)
2015	Kalteng Putra	0	(0)
- * Club domestic league appearances and goals

Septariyanto (born 1 September 1982) was an Indonesian footballer who plays as a midfielder.

== Honours ==
Barito Putera

- Liga Indonesia Premier Division: 2011–12
