= Dedy Sutanto =

Indonesian footballer (born 1981)

Personal information
- Date of birth: 19 October 1981 (age 45)
- Place of birth: Surabaya, Indonesia
- Height: 1.79 m (5 ft 10 1/2 in)
- Position: Goalkeeper

Senior career*
Years	Team	Apps	(Gls)
2008−2009	Semen Padang		
2010−2011	Deltras FC	1	(0)
2011–2012	Barito Putera	18	(0)
2013–2016	Persebaya Surabaya	32	(0)

Managerial career
- 2017–2020: Persebaya Surabaya (Goalkeeper coach)
- 2021: Sulut United (Goalkeeper coach)
- 2022–2023: Gresik United (Goalkeeper coach)
- * Club domestic league appearances and goals

Dedy Sutanto (born 19 October 1981, in Surabaya) is an Indonesian professional football coach and former player who is currently goalkeeper coach of Gresik United.

== Honours ==
Barito Putera

- Liga Indonesia Premier Division: 2011–12
