= Supaham =

Indonesian footballer (born 1979)

Personal information
- Full name: Supaham
- Date of birth: 13 February 1979 (age 47)
- Place of birth: Surabaya, Indonesia
- Height: 1.70 m (5 ft 7 in)
- Position: Forward

Senior career*
Years	Team	Apps	(Gls)
1999–2000	Persebaya Surabaya	8	(1)
2000–2001	Persekaba Badung	12	(1)
2001–2002	Persedikab Kediri	11	(2)
2002–2003	Persela Lamongan	10	(1)
2003–2004	Deltras Sidoarjo	11	(1)
2004–2005	Persekaba Badung	15	(3)
2005–2006	Persekabpas Pasuruan	22	(8)
2006–2007	Persija Jakarta	9	(0)
2007–2008	Persita Tangerang	18	(3)
2008–2011	Persipro Probolinggo	42	(13)
2011–2012	Bhayangkara	21	(2)
2013–2014	Persida Sidoarjo	27	(7)
- * Club domestic league appearances and goals as of 30 March 2012

Supaham (born 13 February 1979 in Surabaya, East Java) is an Indonesian former footballer who plays as a forward. He usually plays as striker and is 170 cm tall. He kind of type player who like adventure or travelling from one football club to other many football club. During last 8 years he was playing for 9 clubs. Persebaya Surabaya, Persekabpas Pasuruan, Persija Jakarta, and Bhayangkara are elite football clubs which he providing ever. From all football clubs he provided, he never them to top or peak performance.
