= Nehemia Solossa =

Indonesian footballer

Personal information
- Full name: Nehemia Bill Solossa
- Date of birth: 5 July 1983 (age 43)
- Place of birth: Sorong, Indonesia
- Height: 1.75 m (5 ft 9 in)
- Position: Forward

Youth career
- 1995–2001: Persiss Sorong

Senior career*
Years	Team	Apps	(Gls)
2002–2004	Persiss Sorong		
2005	Persegi Gianyar	18	(2)
2006	Persikad Depok	12	(1)
2007–2008	Persekabpas Pasuruan	20	(7)
2009–2010	Persibo Bojonegoro		
2010–2012	Persiram Raja Ampat	22	(4)
2012–2013	Barito Putera	16	(5)
- * Club domestic league appearances and goals

Nehemia Bill Solossa or Nehemia Solossa (born 5 July 1983 in Sorong, Sorong Regency, West Papua) is an Indonesian former footballer. His brothers, Ortizan and Boaz, are also footballers.

== Family ==
Nehemia was born in the Solossa family, a well-known family in the province of West Papua. Nehemia is the fifth son of Christopher Solossa and Merry Solossa.

His uncle, Jaap Solossa, was the governor of Papua before he died in 2005. Nehemia was born into a footballing family. Almost all of them were professionals, including his brother Ortizan and Boaz Solossa.

== Honours ==
Barito Putera

- Liga Indonesia Premier Division: 2011–12
