= Khokok Roniarto =

Indonesian footballer

Personal information
- Full name: Khokok Roniarto
- Date of birth: 19 March 1990 (age 36)
- Place of birth: Tulungagung, Indonesia
- Height: 1.82 m (6 ft 0 in)
- Position: Defender

Team information
- Current team: Kalbar United
- Number: 87

Senior career*
Years	Team	Apps	(Gls)
2008–2009	Persik Kediri	0	(0)
2010–2011	Persekam Metro	12	(1)
2011–2014	Persepam Madura United	28	(0)
2014–2015	Persik Kediri	3	(0)
2016–2017	Madura	8	(0)
2018–2021	PSKC Cimahi	9	(0)
2022	PSCS Cilacap	0	(0)
2023	Perseta 1970	4	(0)
2025–	Kalbar United	3	(1)
- * Club domestic league appearances and goals as of 22 February 2025

Khokok Roniarto (born 19 March 1990) is an Indonesian professional footballer who plays as a defender for Liga 4 club Kalbar United.

== Club career ==
=== PSCS Cilacap ===
On 17 June 2022, it was announced that Khokok would be joining PSCS Cilacap for the 2022–23 Liga 2 campaign.
