= Guntur Ariyadi =

Indonesian footballer

Personal information
- Full name: Guntur Ariyadi
- Date of birth: 18 March 1987 (age 39)
- Place of birth: Banyuwangi, Indonesia
- Height: 1.74 m (5 ft 9 in)
- Position: Defender

Team information
- Current team: Gresik United
- Number: 2

Senior career*
Years	Team	Apps	(Gls)
2006	Persik Kediri		
2007–2009	Persema Malang	42	(1)
2009–2010	Persik Kediri	20	(0)
2010–2015	Barito Putera	59	(0)
2016–2024	Madura United	106	(0)
2024–2025	RANS Nusantara	16	(0)
2025–	Gresik United	9	(0)
- * Club domestic league appearances and goals as of 8 January 2026

Guntur Ariyadi (born 18 March 1987) is an Indonesian professional footballer who plays as a defender for Liga Nusantara club Gresik United.

== Honours ==
Persik Kediri

- Liga Indonesia Premier Division: 2006

Barito Putera

- Liga Indonesia Premier Division: 2011–12
