= Dominggus Fakdawer =

Indonesian association footballer

Personal information
- Full name: Dominggus Fakdawer
- Date of birth: 31 December 1990 (age 35)
- Place of birth: Sorong, Indonesia
- Height: 1.75 m (5 ft 9 in)
- Position: Defender

Senior career*
Years	Team	Apps	(Gls)
2009–2010	Persiram Raja Ampat	32	(0)
2011–2014	Persita Tangerang	38	(0)
2014–2017	Persipura Jayapura	39	(0)
2017–2018	Sriwijaya	8	(0)
2018–2020	Perseru Serui	10	(0)
2020–2022	Persiba Balikpapan	3	(0)
2022–2023	Persita Tangerang	0	(0)
- * Club domestic league appearances and goals as of 22:52, 12 October 2021 (UTC)

Dominggus Fakdawer (born 31 December 1990) is an Indonesian professional footballer who plays as a defender.

== Club career ==
He has played for Persiram Raja Ampat and Persita Tangerang before moving to Persipura Jayapura in 2014.

On October 23, 2014, he was given a two-match ban after being involved in a fight involving players and team officials in a match against Arema.

== Honours ==
Persita Tangerang

- Liga Indonesia Premier Division runner-up: 2011–12

Persipura Jayapura

- Indonesia Soccer Championship A: 2016
