= Emile Linkers =

Dutch professional football player (born 1990)

Personal information
- Full name: Emile Emanuel Anthony Linkers
- Date of birth: 25 September 1990 (age 36)
- Place of birth: Willemstad, Netherlands Antilles
- Height: 1.80 m (5 ft 11 in)
- Positions: Forward; winger

Team information
- Current team: Assumption United
- Number: 9

Youth career
- Baronie
- NAC Breda
- RBC Roosendaal

Senior career*
Years	Team	Apps	(Gls)
2008–2009	NAC Breda		
2009–2010	Baronie	12	(4)
2010–2011	ARC	13	(7)
2011–2012	PSIM Yogyakarta	16	(15)
2012–2013	PSIS Semarang	9	(5)
2013–2014	Persepam Madura United	11	(8)
2014–2015	PSGC Galuh Ciamis	15	(13)
2017–2018	KFC Sint-Lenaarts		
2018	Baronie	7	(5)
2018–2019	Lienden	2	(0)
2022–2024	RBC Roosendaal		
2024–	Assumption United	0	(0)

International career
2014	Aruba	1	(1)
- * Club domestic league appearances and goals as of 14 November 2024

Emile Emanuel Anthony Linkers (born 25 September 1990) is a professional footballer who plays as a striker for Assumption United in the Thai League 3. Born in Willemstad, Netherlands Antilles, he made one appearance for the Aruba national team in 2014.

== International career ==
Linkers made his debut on 30 May 2014 in a 1–0 victory against Turks and Caicos for the Caribbean Cup. He made his first international goal in the match.

== Career statistics ==
Scores and results list Aruba's goal tally first, score column indicates score after each Linkers goal.

List of international goals scored by Emile Linkers
No.	Date	Venue	Opponent	Score	Result	Competition
1	30 May 2014	Trinidad Stadium, Oranjestad, Aruba	Turks and Caicos Islands	1–0	1–0	2014 Caribbean Cup qualification
