= Antônio Teles =

Brazilian footballer (born 1982)

Personal information
- Full name: Antônio Adriano Teles Junior
- Date of birth: 2 September 1982 (age 44)
- Place of birth: Rio de Janeiro, Brazil
- Height: 1.82 m (5 ft 11 1/2 in)
- Position: Midfielder

Senior career*
Years	Team	Apps	(Gls)
2006–2007	Persiraja Banda Aceh	25	(14)
2007–2008	PSSB Bireuen	28	(7)
2008–2009	PSIS Semarang	16	(5)
2009–2010	Persita Tangerang	18	(3)
2010–2011	Pro Titan FC	15	(4)
2011–2012	KSB West Sumbawa	20	(5)
2013–2014	Kalteng Putra	31	(6)
2015–2016	Persiba Balikpapan	26	(3)
- * Club domestic league appearances and goals as of 18:43, 17 January 2015 (UTC)

Antônio Adriano Teles Junior (born on September 2, 1982) is a Brazilian former footballer who plays as a midfielder.

== Personal life ==
After retiring from football, he decided to become a player agent. He is also one of the agents who often brings quality foreign players in Indonesia, most of whom are from Brazil.
