= Syaifullah Nazar =

Indonesian footballer

Personal information
- Full name: Syaifullah Nazar
- Date of birth: 15 May 1983 (age 43)
- Place of birth: Martapura, South Kalimantan, Indonesia
- Height: 1.72 m (5 ft 7 1/2 in)
- Position: Forward

Senior career*
Years	Team	Apps	(Gls)
2007–2014	Barito Putera	42	(20)
2016	Martapura	20	(6)
2019	Martapura	3	(0)
Total		65	(26)
- * Club domestic league appearances and goals

Syaifullah Nazar (born 15 May 1983) is an Indonesian former footballer who played as a forward. He was one of the original players in South Kalimantan.

== Honours ==
Barito Putera

- Liga Indonesia Premier Division: 2011–12
- Liga Indonesia Second Division: 2008–09

Individual

- Liga Indonesia First Division Top Scorer: 2009–10
