= Rio Ramandika =

Indonesian footballer

Personal information
- Full name: Rio Ramandika
- Date of birth: 31 January 1989 (age 37)
- Place of birth: Jakarta, Indonesia
- Height: 1.76 m (5 ft 9 in)
- Position: Defender

Youth career
- 2008–2010: Persita Tangerang

Senior career*
Years	Team	Apps	(Gls)
2010–2013	Persita Tangerang	33	(0)
2013–2014	Persisam Samarinda	11	(0)
2015–2021	Persita Tangerang	76	(0)
2021	Perserang Serang	7	(0)
- * Club domestic league appearances and goals as of 30 November 2021

Rio Ramandika (born 31 January 1989) is an Indonesian professional footballer who plays as a defender.

== Club career ==
=== Persita Tangerang ===
Rio joined in the squad for Indonesia Soccer Championship, and he made his debut against Persikabo Bogor.

=== Perserang Serang ===
On 18 June 2021, Rio joined Perserang Serang from Persita Tangerang to play in 2021-22 Liga 2, he was contracted for one year with his friend while still in Persita, Egi Melgiansyah, Yogi Triana and Henry Rivaldi.

== Honours ==
Persita Tangerang

- Liga Indonesia Premier Division runner-up: 2011–12
- Liga 2 runner-up: 2019
