= Muhammad Hamzah =

Indonesian footballer

Personal information
- Full name: Muhammad Hamzah
- Date of birth: 1 January 1986 (age 40)
- Place of birth: Tidore, Indonesia
- Height: 1.73 m (5 ft 8 in)
- Position: Defender

Senior career*
Years	Team	Apps	(Gls)
2008–2011	Persibo Bojonegoro	42	(1)
2011–2012	Bhayangkara	21	(1)
2013	Persiwa Wamena	20	(1)
2014–2015	Sriwijaya	24	(0)
Total		107	(3)
- * Club domestic league appearances and goals

Muhammad Hamzah (born 1 January 1986) is a former Indonesian footballer.

== Honours ==
Persibo Bojonegoro

- Liga Indonesia Premier Division: 2009–10
