= David Ariyanto =

Indonesian footballer

Personal information
- Full name: David Rikza Ariyanto
- Date of birth: 8 January 1987 (age 39)
- Place of birth: Cilacap, Indonesia
- Height: 1.85 m (6 ft 1 in)
- Position: Goalkeeper

Senior career*
| Years | Team | Apps | (Gls) |
| 2006–2008 | Bontang | 3 | (0) |
| 2009 | Persikab Bandung | 7 | (0) |
| 2010 | Persiwa Wamena | 3 | (0) |
| 2011 | Barito Putera | 5 | (0) |
| 2012 | Persewangi Banyuwangi | 8 | (0) |
| 2013 | Barito Putera | 0 | (0) |
| 2014 | Persekap Pasuruan | 0 | (0) |
| 2015–2016 | PSM Makassar | 4 | (0) |
| 2017–2018 | Borneo | 1 | (0) |
| 2019 | Kalteng Putra | 5 | (0) |
| 2020 | PSMS Medan | 0 | (0) |
| 2021–2022 | Persebaya Surabaya | 0 | (0) |
| 2022 | Persikab Bandung | 0 | (0) |
- * Club domestic league appearances and goals as of 15 June 2020

David Rikza Ariyanto (born 8 January 1987) is an Indonesian professional footballer who plays as a goalkeeper.

== Club career ==
=== PSM Makassar ===
Ariyanto joined the Borneo team for 2016 Indonesia Soccer Championship A. He made his debut against Arema F.C. in the sixth week of the 2016 season.

=== Borneo ===
On 2017, He was signed a one-year contract with Liga 1 club Borneo. Ariyanto made his debut on 4 November 2017 in a match against Perseru Serui.

=== Kalteng Putra ===
On 2019, Ariyanto signed a contract with Liga 1 club Kalteng Putra on a free transfer. He made his debut on 26 July 2019 in a match against TIRA-Persikabo.

=== Persebaya Surabaya ===
In 2021, Ariyanto signed a contract with Indonesian Liga 1 club Persebaya Surabaya.
