= Tema Mursadat =

Indonesian footballer

Personal information
- Full name: Tubagus Tema Mursadat
- Date of birth: 7 March 1978 (age 48)
- Place of birth: Lebak, Indonesia
- Height: 1.80 m (5 ft 11 in)
- Position: Goalkeeper

Senior career*
| Years | Team | Apps | (Gls) |
| 2003–2007 | Persikota Tangerang | 78 | (0) |
| 2007–2010 | Persib Bandung | 27 | (0) |
| 2010–2011 | Persikabo Bogor | 19 | (0) |
| 2011–2012 | Persita Tangerang | 11 | (0) |
| 2012–2013 | Pelita Bandung Raya | 24 | (0) |
| 2014–2016 | Persikabo Bogor | 21 | (0) |
| 2017–2018 | Perserang Serang | 10 | (0) |
| Total | | 190 | (0) |

Managerial career
- 2018–2025: Perserang Serang (Goalkeeper coach)
- 2025–2026: Persikota Tangerang (Goalkeeper coach)
- 2026–: Sumsel United (Goalkeeper coach)
- * Club domestic league appearances and goals

Tema Mursadat (born 7 March 1978) is an Indonesian former footballer who plays as a goalkeeper.

== Honours ==
Persita Tangerang

- Liga Indonesia Premier Division runner-up: 2011–12
