= Anoure Obiora =

Nigerian footballer

Personal information
- Full name: Anoure Obiora Richard
- Date of birth: 4 April 1986 (age 40)
- Place of birth: Lagos, Nigeria
- Height: 1.88 m (6 ft 2 in)
- Position: Striker

Senior career*
Years	Team	Apps	(Gls)
2003	Jasper United		
2004	Power All Stars		
2005–2006	PSDS Deli Serdang	33	(15)
2007–2010	Sriwijaya	91	(21)
2010	PSM Makassar	10	(0)
2011	Crawley Town	2	(2)
2011	Bhayangkara F.C.	11	(4)
2012	Perseman Manokwari		
2012	Sporting Clube de Goa	8	(2)
2013	Persisam Putra Samarinda	12	(3)

International career
2006–2009	Nigeria U23	17	(0)
- * Club domestic league appearances and goals as of 23 April 2013

Anoure Obiora (born 4 April 1986) is a Nigerian footballer. He previously played as a forward for Persisam Putra Samarinda in Indonesia Super League.

== Honours ==
Sriwijaya

- Liga Indonesia Premier Division: 2007–08
- Copa Indonesia/Piala Indonesia: 2007–08, 2008–09, 2010

Individual

- Copa Indonesia Best Player: 2008–09
