= Perssin Sinjai =

Indonesian football club

- Full name: Perserikatan Sepakbola Sinjai
- Nickname: Kuda Jantan dari Selatan (Stallion of the South)
- Short name: Perssin
- Founded: 1970; 56 years ago
- Ground: Andi Bintang Stadium; Sinjai, South Sulawesi
- Capacity: 15,000
- Owner: Askab PSSI Sinjai
- Chairman: Hasir Achmad
- Manager: Sainal
- Coach: Darwis
- League: Liga 4
- 2023: Semifinals, (South Sulawesi zone)
Home colours	Away colours

Perssin (stands for Perserikatan Sepakbola Sinjai) is an Indonesian football club based in Sinjai, South Sulawesi. They currently compete in the Liga 4.

== Players ==
As of 24 November 2021

Note: Flags indicate national team as defined under FIFA eligibility rules; some limited exceptions apply. Players may hold more than one non-FIFA nationality.

No.	Pos.	Nation	Player
—	GK	IDN	Asri
—	GK	IDN	Suryadi R.
—	DF	IDN	A. Otmar Mangaparang
—	DF	IDN	Fahrul Akbar
—	DF	IDN	Ilfan Ilyas
—	DF	IDN	Imran
—	DF	IDN	Indrayanto
—	DF	IDN	Lukman
—	DF	IDN	Muh. Ardan M. Arief
—	DF	IDN	Muhammad Haeril
—	DF	IDN	Nurul Aksa
—	MF	IDN	Alfian
—	MF	IDN	Andi Wahyu

No.	Pos.	Nation	Player
—	MF	IDN	Febriansyah
—	MF	IDN	Muhammad Rizal
—	MF	IDN	Sulkifli
—	MF	IDN	Syahrul
—	MF	IDN	Syahrul Gunawan
—	FW	IDN	A. Ilham Asdar
—	FW	IDN	Aidil Fitrawan
—	FW	IDN	Ahmad Sainal Basri
—	FW	IDN	Khairul Akbar
—	FW	IDN	Muhammad Nurfarli
—	FW	IDN	Mutawwakil Barja
—	FW	IDN	Sandi Setiawan

== Coaching staff ==
Position	Name	Nationality
Chairman	Hasir Achmad	Indonesia
Manager	Sainal	Indonesia
Assistant manager	Muhammad Nur Adri Arief	Indonesia
Head coach	Darwis	Indonesia
Assistant coach	Gazali Adil	Indonesia
Secretary	Zainal Ridwan	Indonesia
