= Cristian Carrasco =

Chilean footballer (born 1978)

Personal information
- Full name: Cristian Eduardo Carrasco González
- Date of birth: 7 July 1978 (age 48)
- Place of birth: Santiago, Chile
- Height: 1.80 m (5 ft 11 in)
- Position: Striker

Team information
- Current team: Banten Jaya (manager)

Youth career
- 1985–1995: Audax Italiano
- 1995–1996: Unión Española

Senior career*
Years	Team	Apps	(Gls)
- Unión Española
2002–2003	Persim Maros		(40)
2003–2004	PSMS Medan		
2004–2005	Persebaya Surabaya		
2005–2006	Persipura Jayapura		
2006	Persma Manado		
2006–2007	Kuala Muda Naza		
2007–2008	San Marcos		
2008–2009	PSM Makassar		
2009–2013	Persita Tangerang		
2017	Assalam		

Managerial career
- 2018–: Banten Jaya
- * Club domestic league appearances and goals

Cristian Eduardo Carrasco González (born 7 July 1978) is a Chilean former professional footballer who played as a forward.

== Career ==
As a child, Carrasco joined Audax Italiano youth system at the age of 7, coinciding with well-known players such as Rafael Olarra and Alejandro Carrasco. Then he moved to Unión Española, aged 17. After playing for clubs in his country at the three mainly divisions, he went to Indonesia.

He played for Persim Maros, where also played his compatriot Fernando Cárdenas, Persita Tangerang in the Indonesian Super League, among other clubs. With Persim Maros, he scored forty goals between 2002 and 2003.

He has continued on playing football for exhibition games alongside players such as Claudio Martínez and Alejandro Tobar.

== Personal life ==
He is known as "Spider-Man" for his penchant of putting on a Spider-Man mask to celebrate after scoring a goal. Carrasco puts it down to his love for the comic character while growing up.

== Honours ==
Persebaya Surabaya

- 2004 Liga Indonesia Premier Division: 🥇 Champions

Persipura Jayapura

- Copa Indonesia runner-up: 2006

Persita Tangerang

- Liga Indonesia Premier Division runner-up: 2011–12
