= Sackie Doe =

Liberian footballer

Personal information
- Full name: Sackie Teah Doe
- Date of birth: 8 December 1988 (age 37)
- Place of birth: Monrovia, Liberia
- Height: 1.75 m (5 ft 9 in)
- Position: Midfielder

Senior career*
Years	Team	Apps	(Gls)
2002–2005	Invincible Eleven		
2006–2009	LPRC Oilers		
2009–2010	Deltras Sidoarjo	17	(3)
2010–2011	Bhayangkara	23	(9)
2011–2013	Barito Putera	36	(18)
2014–2015	PS Bangka	19	(3)
2016–2017	Chin United	22	(0)
2018	Zwekapin United	17	(1)
2018–2019	Chin United	0	(0)
2019	Madura United	0	(0)
2019	Barito Putera	8	(0)
2020–2021	Persik Kediri	10	(0)
2022–2023	Gresik United	1	(0)
2025–	Inter Kediri	11	(5)

International career^{‡}
2005	Liberia	4	(0)
- * Club domestic league appearances and goals as of 15 February 2025 ‡ National team caps and goals as of 14 August 2005

Sackie Teah Doe (born 8 December 1988) is a Liberian professional footballer who last played as a midfielder for Liga 4 club Inter Kediri. He formerly represented the Liberia national team.

== Club career ==
=== Barito Putera ===
In 2019, Sackie Doe signed a contract with Indonesian Liga 1 club Barito Putera. He made his league debut on 23 September 2019 in a match against Persija Jakarta at the Patriot Candrabaga Stadium, Bekasi

=== Persik Kediri ===
He was signed for Persik Kediri to play in Liga 1 in the 2020 season. Sackie Doe made his league debut on 29 February 2020 in a match against Persebaya Surabaya at the Gelora Bung Tomo Stadium, Surabaya. This season was suspended on 27 March 2020 due to the COVID-19 pandemic. The season was abandoned and was declared void on 20 January 2021.

=== Gresik United ===
Sackie Doe was signed for Gresik United to play in Liga 2 in the 2022 season.

== Personal life ==
In 2019, he became an Indonesian citizen through the naturalization process.

== Career statistics ==
=== International ===
As of match played 15 December 2005

Appearances and goals by national team and year
National team	Year	Apps	Goals
Liberia	2005	4	0
Total		4	0

== Honours ==
Deltras Sidoarjo

- Liga Indonesia Premier Division runner up: 2009–10

Barito Putera

- Liga Indonesia Premier Division: 2011–12

Individual

- Liga Indonesia Premier Division Top Goalscorer: 2011–12
