= Ade Jantra =

Indonesian footballer (born 1990)

Personal information
- Full name: Ade Jantra Lukmana
- Date of birth: 3 January 1990 (age 36)
- Place of birth: Tangerang, Indonesia
- Height: 1.72 m (5 ft 8 in)
- Position: Attacking midfielder

Team information
- Current team: PSMS Medan
- Number: 14

Youth career
- 2008–2009: Persita Tangerang

Senior career*
Years	Team	Apps	(Gls)
2009–2014	Persita Tangerang	84	(13)
2015	Borneo	1	(0)
2016–2017	Persija Jakarta	18	(2)
2017	Persikad Depok	9	(0)
2018–2022	Persita Tangerang	62	(7)
2022	Bekasi City	6	(0)
2023–2025	Persela Lamongan	20	(2)
2025–	PSMS Medan	0	(0)
- * Club domestic league appearances and goals as of 22:05, 15 December 2024 (UTC)

Ade Jantra Lukmana (born 3 January 1990) is an Indonesian professional footballer who plays as an attacking midfielder for Championship club PSMS Medan.

== Club career ==
In January 2015, he moved to Pusamania Borneo.

Ahead of the 2023–24 Liga 2 (Indonesia), Ade Jantra signed a year contract with Persela Lamongan.

== Honours ==
Persita Tangerang U-21

- Indonesia Super League U-21 runner-up: 2008-09

Persita Tangerang

- Liga Indonesia Premier Division runner-up: 2011–12
- Liga 2 runner-up: 2019
