= Lorenzo Rimkus =

Dutch association football player

Personal information
- Date of birth: 22 September 1984 (age 42)
- Place of birth: Rotterdam, Netherlands
- Position: Midfielder

Senior career*
Years	Team	Apps	(Gls)
2001–2005	Sparta Rotterdam	68	(1)
2005–2007	Den Bosch	50	(0)
2007–2009	Lierse	24	(4)
2009	→ Turnhout	16	(5)
2009–2010	Turnhout	20	(4)
2010–2011	SV ARC	25	(1)
2011–2012	SV ARC	17	(1)
2011–2012	PSIM Yogyakarta	17	(6)
- * Club domestic league appearances and goals

Lorenzo Rimkus (born 22 September 1984) is a Dutch former professional footballer who played as a midfielder.

== Career ==
Rimkus made his debut in professional football on 5 April 2002 for Sparta Rotterdam in a game against FC Twente replacing Dave van der Meer in the 69th minute.

He formerly played for SV ARC.

== Personal life ==
Rimkus is of Surinamese descent, from his mother side.
