= Kristian Adelmund =

Dutch footballer

Personal information
- Date of birth: 1 February 1987 (age 39)
- Place of birth: Rotterdam, Netherlands
- Height: 1.93 m (6 ft 4 in)
- Position: Centre-back

Youth career
- SVS
- Feyenoord
- Sparta Rotterdam

Senior career*
Years	Team	Apps	(Gls)
2007–2008	VV SHO		
2008–2011	VV Capelle	34	(1)
2011–2012	PSIM Yogyakarta		
2013	Persepam Madura Utama	5	(0)
2014	PSS Sleman		
2015–2016	Persela Lamongan	10	(1)
2016–2019	Feyenoord		
- * Club domestic league appearances and goals

Kristian Adelmund (born 1 February 1987) is a Dutch former professional footballer who played as a centre-back.

== Club career ==
Adelmund played in the youth teams of Feyenoord and Sparta Rotterdam but started his senior career at amateur side VV SHO after Sparta released him in summer 2008. He moved on to VV Capelle a year later before leaving to pursue a professional career in Indonesia.
