= Leonardo Verón =

Argentine footballer (born 1982)

Personal information
- Full name: Leonardo Adrián Verón
- Date of birth: 22 January 1982 (age 44)
- Place of birth: Isidro Casanova, Argentina
- Height: 1.83 m (6 ft 0 in)
- Position: Attacking midfielder

Senior career*
Years	Team	Apps	(Gls)
1998–2003	Boca Juniors		
2004	Kedah FA		
2004	Chacarita Juniors		
2005	Defensores de Cambaceres		
2005–2007	Sportivo Belgrano		
2008–2009	Minervén		
2009-2010	Persih Tembilahan		
2011–2012	Persita Tangerang		
- * Club domestic league appearances and goals

Leonardo Adrián Verón (born 22 January 1982) is an Argentine former professional footballer who played as an attacking midfielder.

== Honours ==
Persita Tangerang

- Liga Indonesia Premier Division runner-up: 2011–12
