= Luis Durán =

Chilean footballer (born 1979)

Personal information
- Full name: Luis Edmundo Durán Riquelme
- Date of birth: 2 June 1979 (age 47)
- Place of birth: Valdivia, Chile
- Height: 1.82 m (6 ft 0 in)
- Position: Defender

Youth career
- 1995–1996: Irineo Badilla
- 1995–1996: Deportes Linares

Senior career*
Years	Team	Apps	(Gls)
1997–2001	Deportes Linares		
2002	Unión La Calera		
2003	Deportes Ovalle		
2004–2005	Deportes Copiapó	6	(0)
2006	Santiago Wanderers	2	(0)
2007–2008	Mitra Kukar		
2008–2009	Persis Solo		
2009–2016	Persita Tangerang	46	(5)

International career
1994–1995	Chile U17		

Managerial career
- 2020–2021: Persita Tangerang (youth)
- 2023: Persita Tangerang
- * Club domestic league appearances and goals

Luis Edmundo Durán Riquelme (born 2 June 1979) is a Chilean former professional footballer who played as a defender.

== Club career ==
Born in Valdivia, Chile, he began his career playing for Deportes Linares in the Primera B de Chile in 1998. He stayed in the Chilean football until 2006, when he moved to Indonesia and joined Mitra Kukar in the Divisi Satu. In 2009 he joined Persita Tangerang in the Divisi Utama, staying at the club until 2016.

Following his retirement, he developed a coaching career in Persita Tangerang at youth level.

== Managerial statistics ==
As of match played 1 September 2023

Managerial record by team and tenure
Team	From	To	Record				
Team	From	To	P	W	D	L	Win %
Persita	27 February 2023	7 September 2023	20	7	3	10	35.0
Total			20	7	3	10	35.0

== Honours ==
Persita Tangerang

- Liga Indonesia Premier Division runner-up: 2011–12
