= Maman (footballer) =

Indonesian footballer

Personal information
- Full name: Maman
- Date of birth: 30 July 1980 (age 46)
- Place of birth: Bogor, Indonesia
- Height: 1.60 m (5 ft 3 in)
- Position: Midfielder

Senior career*
Years	Team	Apps	(Gls)
2001–2006	Persita Tangerang	214	(24)

International career
2001	Indonesia	1	(0)
- * Club domestic league appearances and goals

Maman (born 30 July 1980) is an Indonesian former professional footballer who played as a midfielder.

== International career ==
He gained his only international cap on 8 April 2001 in a 2002 FIFA World Cup qualification match against the Maldives.
