= Agustiar Batubara =

Indonesian footballer (born 1978)

Personal information
- Full name: Agustiar Batubara
- Date of birth: 20 August 1978 (age 48)
- Place of birth: Surabaya, Indonesia
- Height: 1.77 m (5 ft 10 in)
- Position: Defender

Team information
- Current team: Barito Putra

Youth career
- 1994–1996: Persebaya Junior

Senior career*
Years	Team	Apps	(Gls)
1998	Persebaya Surabaya		
1999–2005	Deltras Sidoarjo		
2006–2008	Pelita Jaya Purwakarta		
2008–2011	Persela Lamongan		
2011–2012	Barito Putra	16	
- * Club domestic league appearances and goals

Agustiar Batubara (born 20 August 1978 in Surabaya, East Java) is an Indonesian footballer. He normally plays as a defender and is 1.77 m (5 ft 10 in) tall. He played from 1999 to 2005 with Deltras Sidoarjo, from 2006 to 2008 with Pelita Jaya Purwakarta, and until 2008 with Persebaya Surabaya. Since 2011 he joined Barito Putra and captained the team. He has Batak descent from his parents, but he was born and grew up in Surabaya.

== Honours ==
Barito Putera

- Liga Indonesia Premier Division: 2011–12
