= 2011–12 Liga Indonesia Premier Division =

Liga Indonesia Premier Division
- Season: 2011–12
- Champions: Barito Putera
- Promoted: Barito Putera; Persita Tangerang; Persepam Madura United
- Relegated: Group 1 : Persitema; PS Bengkulu; PSGL Gayo Lues; Group 2 : Persekam; Perssin Sinjai; PS Mojokerto Putra
- Matches: 235
- Goals: 562 (2.39 per match)
- Top goalscorer: Sackie Teah Doe (18 goals)
- Biggest home win: Perseru 6 – 0 Persigo (3 June 2012)
- Biggest away win: Perssin 0 – 3 Persepam (WO) (1 March 2012); PSMP 0 – 3 West Sumbawa (10 March 2012); Perssin 0 – 3 Persid (WO) (31 March 2012); PSMP 0 – 3 Persid (WO) (15 April 2012)
- Highest scoring: Perssin 5 – 2 Persigo (22 February 2012); Persebaya DU (Bhayangkara) 6 – 1 PSGL (2 June 2012)
- Longest winning run: PSIM Yogyakarta (6 matches)
- Longest unbeaten run: PSBS Biak Numfor (15 matches)
- Longest winless run: PSGL Gayo Lues (12 matches)
- Longest losing run: PS Mojokerto Putra (7 matches)
- Highest attendance: 18,000; Barito 3–0 Persepam (1 April 2012)
- Lowest attendance: 0 PSMP 1 – 1 Persin (4 January 2012); PSMP 2 – 0 Persigo (7 January 2012); Persis 2 – 0 Persebaya DU (Bhayangkara) (30 March 2012); Persita 4 – 1 PSIM (11 June 2012)
- Total attendance: 1,168,389
- Average attendance: 4,972

The 2011–12 Liga Indonesia Premier Division season is the seventeenth edition of Liga Indonesia Premier Division since its establishment in 1994. The competition is managed by PT Liga Indonesia (LI).

This season is the first season of Liga Indonesia Premier Division organized by LI without authorization from PSSI as it has decided to appoint the new PT Liga Prima Indonesia Sportindo (LPIS) to organize the competition. It is then recognized by PSSI breakaway leadership under La Nyalla Matalatti.

The participant initially consists of 30 clubs, later reduced to 26 clubs, and finally reduced to only 22 club, divided into two groups. The fixtures were released on 13 December 2011. The season kicked off on 15 December 2011 and is scheduled to conclude in July 2012.

== Teams ==
Key to colours in tables
Teams in the 2010–11 Indonesian Premier Division
Teams in the 2010 Liga Indonesia First Division
<< :Premier Division Teams • First Division Teams: >>

=== Groups ===
The Competition originally consisted of 30 teams before reduced in to 26 teams because of 4 teams switching to other competitions, and divided into 2 Groups of 13 teams, before 4 teams (PSBI Blitar, Persewangi Banyuwangi, PSCS Cilacap, and Madiun Putra FC.) decided to withdraw to join LPIS, changing the number of teams from 26 to 22.

Group 1	Group 2	Unseeded Teams
Persih Tembilahan	PSBI Blitar‡	PSSB Bireuen‡
PS Bengkulu	PS Mojokerto Putra	PSLS Lhokseumawe‡
Persitara North Jakarta	Persekam Metro FC	Persires Rengat‡
PSGL Gayo Lues	PSBK Blitar	Persikab Bandung (2010–11 Premier Division)‡
Persip Pekalongan	Persid Jember	
Persitema Temanggung	Persewangi Banyuwangi‡	
PSCS Cilacap‡	PS Barito Putera	
PSIM Yogyakarta	Persigo Gorontalo	
Persebaya DU (Bhayangkara)	Perseru Serui	
Persita Tangerang	Persepam Pamekasan	
Persiku Kudus	KSB West Sumbawa	
Persis Solo	Perssin Sinjai	
Madiun Putra FC‡	PSBS Biak	

NOTE : ‡ denotes teams that withdrew to join the LPIS version of the Premier Division.

=== Stadium and locations ===
Locations of 2011–12 Liga Indonesia Premier Division (LI) teams

Team	Regency or City	Province	Stadium	Capacity	2010–11 season
Persebaya DU (Bhayangkara)	Surabaya	East Java	Gelora 10 November	30,000	5th in Group 3 2010–11 Premier Division
Persih Tembilahan	Indragiri Hilir Regency	Riau	Beringin	5,000	6th in Group 1 2010–11 Premier Division
Persiku Kudus	Kudus	Central Java	Wergu Wetan	10,000	7th in Group 3 2010–11 Premier Division
Persip Pekalongan	Pekalongan	Central Java	Gelora Bumi Batik	25,000	8th in 2010 First Division
Persis Solo	Surakarta	Central Java	Manahan	35,000	13th in Group 2 2010–11 Premier Division
Persita Tangerang	Tangerang Regency	Banten	Benteng	20,000	4th in Group 1 2010–11 Premier Division
Persitara North Jakarta	North Jakarta	Jakarta	Tugu	10,000	7th in Group 1 2010–11 Premier Division
Persitema Temanggung	Temanggung Regency	Central Java	Bhumi Phala		Top 12 in 2010 First Division
PS Bengkulu	Bengkulu	Bengkulu	Semarak	15,000	10th in Group 1 2010–11 Premier Division
PSGL Gayo Lues	Gayo Lues Regency	Aceh	Seribu Bukit	5,000	Top 12 in 2010 First Division
PSIM Yogyakarta	Yogyakarta	Yogyakarta	Mandala Krida	25,000	5th in Group 2 2010–11 Premier Division
KSB West Sumbawa	West Sumbawa	West Nusa Tenggara	Gelora Turide		Top 12 in 2010 First Division
Persekam Metro FC	Malang Regency	East Java	Kanjuruhan	30,000	8th in Group 3 2010–11 Premier Division
Persepam Pamekasan	Pamekasan Regency	East Java	Gelora Bangkalan	25,000	3rd/4th in 2010 First Division
Perseru Serui	Yapen Islands Regency	Papua	Marora	10,000	12th in Group 3 2010–11 Premier Division
Persid Jember	Jember	East Java	Notohadinegoro	10,000	Top 24 in 2010 First Division
Persigo Gorontalo	Gorontalo	Gorontalo	Merdeka	10,000	4th in Group 3 2010–11 Premier Division
Perssin Sinjai	Makassar; Sinjai Regency	South Sulawesi	Mattoangin^{1} Andi Bintang	20,000; 15,000	Top 12 in 2010 First Division
PS Barito Putera	Banjarmasin	South Kalimantan	17 May	15,000	6th in Group 2 2010–11 Premier Division
PS Mojokerto Putra	Mojokerto Regency	East Java	Gajahmada Mojosari	10,000	13th in Group 3 2010–11 Premier Division
PSBK Blitar	Blitar	East Java	Gelora Supriyadi	15,000	Top 12 in 2010 First Division
PSBS Biak Numfor	Biak Numfor	Papua	Cendrawasih	30,000	2010 First Division Champions

^{1} = Perssin Sinjai used Mattoangin Stadium while Andi Bintang Stadium was being renovated.

=== Personnel and kit ===
Note: Flags indicate national team as has been defined under FIFA eligibility rules. Players and Managers may hold more than one non-FIFA nationality.

Team	Coach	Captain	Kit manufacturer	Shirt sponsor
West Region
Persebaya DU (Bhayangkara)	Freddy Mulli	Cucu Hidayat	Vilour	Arek Televisi; Autamaras
Persih Tembilahan	Vacant	Agus Salim		
Persiku Kudus	Riono Asnan	Mardianto		
Persip Pekalongan	Nezal Mustofa	Agustus Nemely	Vilour	
Persis Solo	Vacant	Bahroni Fadli		
Persita Tangerang	Elly Idris	Luis Edmundo	Mitre	
Persitara North Jakarta	Syamsul Bachri	Patricio Jimenez	Uno	Prima Agung Indo Graha
Persitema Temanggung	Musorodin	Idrus Gunawan		
PS Bengkulu	M. Nasir	Rossi Gutawa		Mandiri
PSGL Gayo Lues	Kustiono	Adhi Sismanto		
PSIM Yogyakarta	Hanafing	Nova Zaenal		
East Region
KSB West Sumbawa	Mustaqim	Miftahul Huda	SPECS	BRM
Persekam Metro FC	Siswantoro	Jordie Kartiko		
Persepam Pamekasan	Winedi Purwito	Tassiou Bako	Vilour	Merpati
Perseru Serui	Rahman Usman	Ton Harry	adidas	Bank Papua
Persid Jember	Santoso Pribadi	Jaya Hartono		
Persigo Gorontalo	Arifin Adrian	Kardi Gani		
Perssin Sinjai	Ashari	Hamdi Haya		
PS Barito Putera	Solehudin	Henry Njombe	SPECS	Hasnur Group
PS Mojokerto Putra		Andri Budianto		
PSBK Blitar	Nus Yadera	Perry Somah	adidas	
PSBS Biak Numfor	Rully Nere	Ortiz Kurni		Bank Papua

=== Managerial changes ===
Team	Outgoing manager	Manner of departure	Date of vacancy	Position in table	Incoming manager	Date of appointment
Perssin Sinjai	Budiarjo Thalib	Sacked	29 January 2012	7th in Group 2	Ashari	7 February 2012
Persebaya DU (Bhayangkara)	Subangkit	Resigned	11 April 2012	2nd in Group 1	Yusuf Ekodono (caretaker)	12 April 2012
Persebaya DU (Bhayangkara)	Yusuf Ekodono^{1} (caretaker)	End of caretaker role	12 April 2012	2nd in Group 1	Freddy Mully	13 April 2012
Persis Solo	Didik Lestiyantoro	Sacked	24 April 2012	8th in Group 1	Agung Setyabudi (caretaker)	24 April 2012
Persih Tembilahan	Raja Faisal	Sacked	April 2012	7th in Group 1	Sadissou Bako (caretaker)	1 May 2012
Persebaya DU (Bhayangkara)	Freddy Mulli	Sacked	26 June 2012	4th in Group B 2nd round	Yusuf Ekodono (caretaker)	28 June 2012

Note:
^{1} = Just lead the team in one match on 12 April 2012 against Persitema Temanggung.

=== Foreign player ===
==== West Region ====
Club	Visa 1	Visa 2	Visa 3	Non-Visa Foreign
Persebaya DU (Bhayangkara)	(Cameroon) Mohammadou Al Hadji	(Nigeria) Richard Obiora	(Nigeria) Charles Parker	None
Persih Tembilahan	(Cameroon) Zoubairou Garba	(Cameroon) Daniel Ose	None	None
Persiku Kudus	(Liberia) Peter Kuoh	(Chile) Alejandro Tobar	(Nigeria) Onyekachukwu Aloso	None
Persip Pekalongan	(Liberia) Augustus Nimely	(Mali) Dede Tamboura	(Cameroon) Jacques Evrad	None
Persis	(Cameroon) Nicolas Djone	(Paraguay) Diego Mendieta	(Cameroon) Mbaiogauo Dillah^{2}	None
Persita	(Chile) Luis Durán	(Chile) Cristian Carrasco	(Argentina) Leonardo Verón^{2}	None
Persitara North Jak	(Chile) Pato Jimenez	(Brazil) Michel Adolfo	(Chile) Julio Eduardo^{2}	None
Persitema Temanggung	(Liberia) Anthony Ballah	(Liberia) Carter Konah	(Cameroon) Arsene Ntolo	None
PS Bengkulu	None	None	None	None
PSGL Gayo Lues	(Guinea) Morlaye Touré	(Nigeria) Felix Obinna	(Guinea) Lamarana Diallo	None
PSIM	(Netherlands) Emile Linkers	(Netherlands) Kristian Adelmund	(Netherlands) Lorenzo Rimkus	None

Note:
^{1}Those players who were born and started their professional career abroad but have since gained Indonesia Residency;
^{2}Replacement of foreign players in the second phase of the Transfer Windows;
^{3}New players in the second phase of the Transfer Windows

==== East Region ====
Club	Visa 1	Visa 2	Visa 3	Non-Visa Foreign
Barito Putera	(Cameroon) Henry Njobi	(Cameroon) Bienvenue Nnengue	(Liberia) Sackie Doe	None
Pakindo MP	(Nigeria) Austin Oboh	(Nigeria) Eqiwatu Godstim	None	None
Persekam Metro	None	None	None	None
Persepam Madura United	(Cameroon) Tassiou Bako	(Brazil) Evandro	(Cameroon) Martial Poungoue	None
Perseru	(Ghana) Aboubacar Camara	(Nigeria) Emeka Okoye	(Nigeria) Nwanko Daniel	None
Persid Jember	(Liberia) Junior	(Nigeria) Ngom Totto	(Nigeria) William Kavuma	None
Semeru	None	None	None	None
Perssin Sinjai	None	None	None	None
PSBK Blitar	(Liberia) Alfred Ballah	(Liberia) George Dakar	(Liberia) Perry Somah	None
PSBS	(Liberia) Varney Pas Boakay	(Liberia) Mark Davies	None	None
West Sumbawa	(Morocco) Ali Tallouk	(Cameroon) Kamdem Martial	(Brazil) Antonio Teles	None

Note:
^{1}Those players who were born and started their professional career abroad but have since gained Indonesia Residency;
^{2}Replacement of foreign players in the second phase of the Transfer Windows;
^{3}New players in the second phase of the Transfer Windows

== First round ==
=== Group 1 ===
Pos	Team	Pld	W	D	L	GF	GA	GD	Pts	Qualification or relegation
1	Persita	20	13	5	2	37	13	+24	44	2011–12 Liga Indonesia Premier Division Second round
2	Persebaya DU (Bhayangkara)	20	12	2	6	34	19	+15	38	2011–12 Liga Indonesia Premier Division Second round
3	Persiku Kudus	20	9	8	3	29	16	+13	35	2011–12 Liga Indonesia Premier Division Second round
4	PSIM	20	9	6	5	26	20	+6	33	2011–12 Liga Indonesia Premier Division Second round
5	Persitara North Jak	20	9	3	8	31	23	+8	30	
6	Persip Pekalongan	20	8	3	9	25	24	+1	27	
7	Persis	20	6	5	9	19	26	−7	23	
8	Persih Tembilahan	20	6	4	10	18	27	−9	22	
9	Persitema Temanggung (R)	20	6	2	12	15	32	−17	20	Relegation to 2012–13 Liga Indonesia First Division
10	PS Bengkulu (R)	20	5	4	11	15	30	−15	19	Relegation to 2012–13 Liga Indonesia First Division
11	PSGL Gayo Lues (R)	20	4	4	12	18	37	−19	16	Relegation to 2012–13 Liga Indonesia First Division

Updated to match(es) played on 17 June 2012. Source: 2011–12 Premier Division table
Rules for classification: 1) points; 2) goal difference; 3) number of goals scored.
(R) Relegated

==== Results ====
Home \ Away	BHA	PSIH	PSKU	PSIP	SOL	PTA	TARA	TEMA	PSBU	PSGL	YOG
Persebaya DU (Bhayangkara)		2–0	1–2	2–0	3–0	1–0	2–0	1–0	2–0	6–1	2–2
Persih Tembilahan	1–3		0–0	2–0	3–0	1–0	0–0	1–1	3–0	2–1	2–1
Persiku Kudus	1–0	3–0		1–1	1–1	1–2	2–1	3–0	4–0	3–2	2–0
Persip Pekalongan	2–0	3–1	0–0		2–1	0–1	1–0	3–1	4–0	3–0	1–2
Persis	2–0	2–0	0–1	2–2		1–1	2–1	2–0	1–0	4–2	0–0
Persita	3–1	1–0	1–1	3–1	2–0		1–0	5–0	1–1	3–0	4–1
Persitara North Jakarta	2–0	3–0	2–2	1–2	4–1	1–1		4–2	3–1	4–1	1–0
Persitema Temanggung	1–2	1–0	2–1	1–0	1–0	0–2	2–0		1–1	1–0	0–1
PS Bengkulu	0–2	2–0	0–0	1–0	0–0	1–3	0–1	2–1		1–0	3–0
PSGL Gayo Lues	1–3	2–2	0–0	2–0	1–0	1–2	0–2	2–0	2–1		0–0
PSIM	1–1	2–0	3–1	3–0	2–0	1–1	3–1	2–0	2–1	0–0	

Updated to match(es) played on 17 June 2012. Source: 2011–12 Premier Division results
Legend: Blue = home team win; Yellow = draw; Red = away team win.

=== Group 2 ===
Pos	Team	Pld	W	D	L	GF	GA	GD	Pts	Qualification or relegation
1	Barito Putera	20	13	4	3	41	15	+26	43	2011–12 Liga Indonesia Premier Division Second round
2	Persepam Madura United	20	11	5	4	26	16	+10	38	2011–12 Liga Indonesia Premier Division Second round
3	West Sumbawa	20	9	6	5	21	18	+3	33	2011–12 Liga Indonesia Premier Division Second round
4	PSBK Blitar	20	9	4	7	24	17	+7	31	2011–12 Liga Indonesia Premier Division Second round
5	PSBS	20	7	8	5	27	22	+5	29	
6	Perseru	20	8	3	9	24	18	+6	27	
7	Semeru	20	8	3	9	22	37	−15	27	
8	Persid Jember	20	7	2	11	20	23	−3	23	
9	Persekam Metro (R)	20	5	5	10	22	27	−5	20	Relegation to 2012–13 Liga Indonesia First Division
10	Perssin Sinjai (R)	20	6	4	10	22	35	−13	16 (Note: Perssin Sinjai were deducted 6 points due to unsportsmanlike on 2 matches against Persepam Madura United (1 March 2012) and Persid Jember (31 March 2012).)	Relegation to 2012–13 Liga Indonesia First Division
11	Pakindo MP (R)	20	3	4	13	11	32	−21	13	Relegation to 2012–13 Liga Indonesia First Division

Updated to match(es) played on 17 June 2012. Source: 2011–12 Premier Division table
Rules for classification: 1) points; 2) goal difference; 3) number of goals scored.
(R) Relegated

==== Results ====
Home \ Away	BPT	PMP	PMFC	PPMU	PSR	PSDJ	SEM	SINJ	PSBK	BIA	KSB
Barito Putera		1–0	4–0	3–0	3–0	2–0	4–0	1–0	2–0	4–1	3–0
Pakindo MP	2–3		2–1	0–0	1–0	0–3 (Note: Match awarded to Persid due to failure of Mojokerto Putra to arrange the match.)	2–0	1–1	0–0	0–0	0–3
Persekam Metro	1–1	2–1		0–0	3–2	2–0	4–0	5–1	1–2	1–1	1–1
Persepam Madura United	2–1	2–0	1–1		1–0	2–1	1–0	3–1	1–1	1–0	2–0
Perseru	0–1	3–0	1–0	1–0		2–0	6–0	2–0	2–0	1–1	1–0
Persid Jember	1–1	2–0	1–0	1–2	1–0		1–2	1–1	3–1	0–1	1–0
Semeru	2–2	3–1	2–0	2–1	2–1	1–0		2–1	1–0	1–1	1–1
Perssin Sinjai	2–2	2–0	2–0	0–3 (Note: Match awarded to Persepam due to unrest among supporters at minute 65.)	0–0	0–3 (Note: Match awarded to Persid due to interruption of referee's decision.)	5–2		1–0	2–1	2–0
PSBK Blitar	2–0	1–0	2–0	2–0	3–1	3–0	2–0	2–0		0–0	1–1
PSBS	1–3	4–1	2–0	1–3	1–1	1–0	2–0	5–1	2–1		1–1
West Sumbawa	1–0	1–0	1–0	1–1	1–0	2–1	2–1	2–0	2–1	1–1	

Updated to match(es) played on 17 June 2012. Source: 2011–12 Premier Division results
Legend: Blue = home team win; Yellow = draw; Red = away team win.

== Second round ==
Second stage started on 25 June 2012 in Gelora Delta Stadium, Sidoarjo. with matches played in Gelora Delta Stadium, Sidoarjo, Surajaya Stadium, Lamongan, Mandala Krida Stadium, Yogyakarta, and U.N.Y Stadium, Yogyakarta. and concluded on 1 July 2012.

=== Qualified Teams ===
Group 1	Group 2
Persita Tangerang	PS Barito Putera
Persebaya DU (Bhayangkara)	Persepam Pamekasan
Persiku Kudus	KSB West Sumbawa
PSIM Yogyakarta	PSBK Blitar

Key to colours in group tables
Team progressed to the Knockout Stage

=== Group A ===
- 5 matches were played in Gelora Delta Stadium, Sidoarjo.
- 1 match were played in Surajaya Stadium, Lamongan.
- All times are Western Indonesia Time (WIB) – UTC+07:00.

Team	Pld	W	D	L	GF	GA	GD	Pts
Persepam Madura United	3	2	0	1	3	3	0	6
Persita Tangerang	3	1	2	0	5	3	+2	5
PSBK Blitar	3	1	1	1	4	3	+1	4
Persiku Kudus	3	0	1	2	2	5	−3	1

25 June 2012
Persita	2 – 0	Persepam
Persiku	0 – 2	PSBK
27 June 2012
Persita	2 – 2	Persiku
Persepam	2 – 1	PSBK
30 June 2012
Persiku	0 – 1	Persepam
PSBK	1 – 1	Persita

=== Group B ===
- 5 matches were played in Mandala Krida Stadium, Yogyakarta.
- 1 match were played in U.N.Y Stadium, Yogyakarta.
- All times are Western Indonesia Time (WIB) – UTC+07:00.

Team	Pld	W	D	L	GF	GA	GD	Pts
PSIM Yogyakarta	3	3	0	0	5	2	+3	9
PS Barito Putera	3	1	1	1	6	3	+3	4
Persebaya DU (Bhayangkara)	3	1	0	2	4	7	−3	3
PS Sumbawa Barat	3	0	1	2	2	5	−3	1

26 June 2012
Barito Putera	5 – 1	Persebaya DU (Bhayangkara)
West Sumbawa	1 – 2	PSIM
28 June 2012
Persebaya DU (Bhayangkara)	1 – 2	PSIM
Barito Putera	1 – 1	West Sumbawa
1 July 2012
West Sumbawa	0 – 2	Persebaya DU (Bhayangkara)
PSIM	1 – 0	Barito Putera

== Knockout stage ==
The knockout stage is scheduled to begin on 5 July 2012 and to be completed on 7 July 2012 at the Manahan Stadium in Solo, Central Java.

Semi-finals
5 July – Solo, Central Java
Persepam	0
Barito Putera	2
5 July – Solo, Central Java
PSIM	0
Persita	1

Final
8 July - Solo, Central Java
Barito Putera	2
Persita	1
Third place
8 July – Solo, Central Java
Persepam	1
PSIM	0

=== Semi-finals ===
5 July 2012
15:30 WIB

Persepam	0–2	Barito Putera
	Report

Manahan Stadium, Surakarta, Central Java
5 July 2012
19:00 WIB

PSIM	0–1	Persita
	Report

Manahan Stadium, Surakarta, Central Java

=== Third-placed ===
8 July 2012
15:30 WIB

Persepam	1–0	PSIM
	Report

Manahan Stadium, Surakarta, Central Java

=== Final ===
8 July 2012
19:00 WIB

Barito Putera	2–1	Persita
	Report

Manahan Stadium, Surakarta, Central Java

== Champions ==
Champions

== Promotion/relegation play-off ==
17 July 2012
15:30 UTC+7

Gresik United (O) Indonesia Super League	3–1	PSIM Yogyakarta Liga Indonesia Premier Division
Castano 27'; Chena 56', 74'	Report	80' Lukman

Gelora Sriwijaya Stadium
Attendance: 523
Referee: Dodi Setia Purnama (Indonesia)

NB: (O) = Play-off winner; (P) = Promoted to 2012–13 Indonesia Super League; (R) = Relegated to 2012–13 Liga Indonesia Premier Division.

== Season statistics ==
=== Top scorers ===
Rank	Player	Club	Goals
1	Sackie Teah Doe	Barito Putera	18
2	Cristian Carrasco	Persita Tangerang	17
3	Saddam Husain	KSB West Sumbawa	14
4	Anoure Obiora Richard	Persebaya DU (Bhayangkara)	13
5	Martial Poungoue Nz	Persepam Pamekasan	12
6	Agus Santiko	Persiku Kudus	11
6	Peter Kuoh	Persiku Kudus	11
6	Michel Adolfo	Persitara North Jakarta	11
6	Ferry Somah	PSBK Blitar	11
10	Emile Linkers	PSIM Yogyakarta	10

=== Own goals ===
Player	For	Club
Onyekachukwu Aloso	Persitara North Jakarta	Persiku Kudus
Yoga Spria Mirshadaq	Barito Putera	Persepam Pamekasan
Yusdianto Raharjo	Persih Tembilahan	PSGL Gayo Lues

=== Hat-tricks ===
Player	For	Against	Result	Date
Sackie Doe^{4}	Barito Putera	Persekam Metro	4–0	22 February 2012
Diego Mendieta	Persis Solo	PSGL Gayo Lues	4–2	4 March 2012
Dede Tamboura	Persip Pekalongan	PS Bengkulu	4–0	23 April 2012

- ^{4} Player scored 4 goals

=== Scoring ===
- First goal of the season: Emile Linkers for PSIM Yogyakarta against Persita Tangerang (15 December 2011)
- Last goal of the season: Ade Jantra for Persita Tangerang against PS Barito Putera (8 July 2012)
- Fastest goal of the season: 43 seconds – Sugeng Wahyudi for Barito Putera against Persid Jember (16 January 2012)
- Widest winning margin: 6 goals
  - Perseru Serui 6–0 Persigo Gorontalo (3 June 2012)
- Highest scoring game: 7 goals
  - Perssin 5–2 Persigo Gorontalo (22 February 2012)
  - Persebaya DU (Bhayangkara) 6–1 PSGL Gayo Lues (2 June 2012)
- Most goals scored in a match by a single team: 6 goals
  - Persebaya DU (Bhayangkara) 6–1 PSGL Gayo Lues (2 June 2012)
  - Perseru Serui 6–0 Persigo Gorontalo (3 June 2012)
- Most goals scored in a match by a losing team: 2 goals
  - Mojokerto Putra 2–3 Barito Putera (29 January 2012)
  - Persitara North Jakarta 4–2 Persitema Temanggung (16 February 2012)
  - Perssin Sinjai 5–2 Persigo Gorontalo ((22 February 2012))
  - Persiku Kudus 3–2 PSGL Gayo Lues (1 March 2012)
  - Persis Solo 4–2 PSGL Gayo Lues (4 March 2012)
  - Persekam Metro 3–2 Perseru Serui (15 May 2012)
- Widest away winning margin: 3 goals
  - Perssin Sinjai 0–3(w.o) Persepam Madura United (1 March 2012)
  - Mojokerto Putra 0–3 West Sumbawa (10 March 2012)
  - Perssin Sinjai 0–3(w.o) Persid Jember (31 March 2012)
  - Mojokerto Putra 0–3(w.o) Persid Jember (15 April 2012)
- Most goals scored by an away team: 3 goals
  - PSBS Biak Numfor 1–3 Persepam Madura United (3 January 2012)
  - PSBS Biak Numfor 1–3 Barito Putera (7 January 2012)
  - PSGL Gayo Lues 1–3 Persebaya DU (Bhayangkara) (16 January 2012)
  - Mojokerto Putra 2–3 Barito Putera (29 January 2012)
  - Perssin Sinjai 0–3(w.o) Persepam Madura United (1 March 2012)
  - Mojokerto Putra 0–3 West Sumbawa (10 March 2012)
  - Perssin Sinjai 0–3(w.o) Persid Jember (31 March 2012)
  - Mojokerto Putra 0–3(w.o) Persid Jember (15 April 2012)
  - PS Bengkulu 1–3 Persita Tangerang (2 June 2012)
  - Persih Tembilahan 1–3 Persebaya DU (Bhayangkara) (13 June 2012)

=== Clean sheets ===
- Most Clean Sheets: 11
  - Barito Putera
- Fewest clean sheets: 3
  - Persekam Metro
  - Persigo Gorontalo
