= Elly Idris =

Indonesian football player and coach (1962–2026)

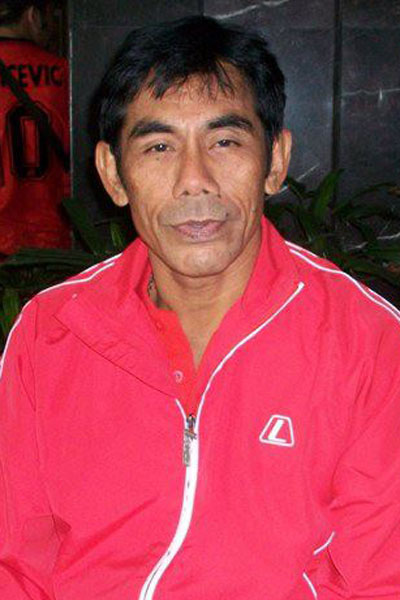
- Idris in 2011

Personal information
- Date of birth: 4 November 1962
- Place of birth: Sula Islands, Indonesia
- Date of death: 12 February 2026 (aged 63)
- Place of death: South Tangerang, Indonesia
- Position: Midfielder

Youth career
- 1979–1980: PS Jayakarta

Senior career*
Years	Team	Apps	(Gls)
1982–1984	Yanita Utama		
1985−1988	Krama Yudha Tiga Berlian		
1989	Pelita Jaya		
1989–1996	Persita Tangerang		

International career
1985–1993	Indonesia	15	(0)

Managerial career
- 2002–2006: Persibom Bolaang Mongondow
- 2007–2008: Persita Tangerang (assistant coach)
- 2008–2009: Persibom Bolaang Mongondow
- 2010–2013: Persita Tangerang
- 2016: PS Angkatan Laut
- 2017–2018: Persita Tangerang
- 2021–2022: Persitara Jakarta Utara
- * Club domestic league appearances and goals

Elly Idris (4 November 1962 – 12 February 2026) was an Indonesian football player and manager. A midfielder, he made 15 appearances for the Indonesia national team.

Idris died at Cinta Kasih Hospital, Ciputat, South Tangerang, on 12 February 2026, at the age of 63.

== Honours ==
Yanita Utama

- Galatama: 1983–84, 1984

Krama Yudha Tiga Berlian

- Galatama: 1985, 1986–87
- Piala Liga: 1987, 1988

Pelita Jaya

- Galatama: 1988–89
