= Persepam Madura Utama =

Indonesian football club

- Full name: Persatuan Sepak Bola Pamekasan Madura Utama
- Nicknames: Sapeh Ngamok (The Mad Bull); Laskar Ronggo Sukowati (Ronggo Sukowati Warrior)
- Founded: 1970; 56 years ago
- Ground: Gelora Ratu Pamelingan Stadium
- Capacity: 13,500
- Owner: Askab PSSI Pamekasan
- Chairman: Djohan Susanto
- Manager: Ali Wafa
- Coach: Mochammad Romly Effendy
- League: Liga 4
- 2024–25: 4th, in Group D (East Java zone)
Home colours	Away colours

Persatuan Sepak Bola Pamekasan Madura Utama, commonly known as Persepam Madura Utama or Persepam, is an Indonesian professional football club based in Pamekasan, East Java. The club plays in the Liga 4.

== History ==
In season 2012–13 the club was promoted to Indonesia Super League after finishing 3rd place in 2011–12 season. In January 2015, they changed their name from Persepam Madura United to Persepam Madura Utama and their nickname to Sapeh Ngamok (The Mad Bull).

== Season-by-season records ==
Season	League/Division	Tms.	Pos.	Piala Indonesia
2004	Third Division		Eliminated in provincial round	–
2005	Third Division		Eliminated in provincial round	–
2006	Third Division		Eliminated in provincial round	–
2007	Third Division			–
2008–09	Second Division	69	3rd, Second round	–
2009–10	First Division	60	3rd, Second round	–
2010	First Division	57	Semi-final	–
2011–12	Premier Division (LI)	22	3	–
2013	Indonesia Super League	18	10	–
2014	Indonesia Super League	22	10th, East division	–
2015	Premier Division	55	did not finish	–
2016	Indonesia Soccer Championship B	53	3rd, Second round	–
2017	Liga 2	61	3rd, Relegation play-offs	–
2018	Liga 3	32	Eliminated in National zone route	First round
2019				
2020	Liga 3	season abandoned		–
2021–22	Liga 3	64	Eliminated in provincial round	–
2022–23	Liga 3	season abandoned		–
2023–24	Liga 3	80	Eliminated in provincial round	–
2024–25	Liga 4	64	Eliminated in provincial round	–

== Honours ==
- Liga Indonesia Premier Division
  - Third place (1): 2011–12
- Liga 4 East Java
  - Champion (1): 2025–26

== See also ==
- List of football clubs in Indonesia
