= PS Barito Putera =

Association football team in Indonesia

Barito Putera
- Full name: Persatuan Sepakbola Barito Putera
- Nicknames: Laskar Antasari (Antasari Warriors); Bakantan Hamuk (The Furious Bekantan)
- Short name: BAR
- Founded: 21 April 1988; 38 years ago
- Stadium: 17th May Stadium; Demang Lehman Stadium
- Capacity: 12,000; 6,979
- Owner: PT Putera Barito Berbakti
- President: Hasnuryadi Sulaiman
- Head coach: Hendri Susilo
- League: Championship
- 2025–26: Championship Group 2, 3rd of 10
- Website: baritoputera.co.id
Home colours	Away colours	Third colours

Persatuan Sepakbola Barito Putera, also known as Barito Putera, is an Indonesian professional football club based in Banjarmasin, South Kalimantan. The club competes in Championship, the second tier of Indonesia football.

== History ==
=== Foundation and Galatama era (1988–1994) ===
Barito Putera was founded in 1988 by H. A. Sulaiman and participated in the 1988–89 Galatama season. Andi Lala was their first coach. For the 1990 season, they signed Frans Sinatra Huwae, who would later be their captain and club legend, and Sukma Sejati as coach. The next year, Sukma Sejati was replaced by Maryoto, who previously coached Frans Sinatra Huwae in Diklat Ragunan. Salahuddin joined Barito and was called to the Indonesia national team for the 1991 Southeast Asian Games, where he won the gold medal. In late 1992, Maryoto was replaced by Andi Teguh because he was appointed as the national team coach. Andi Teguh managed to guide Barito Putera to a third-place finish in the 1992–93 Galatama season with players such as Frans Sinatra Huwae, Salahuddin, Zainuri, Yusuf Luluporo, Abdillah, Albert Korano, Fahmi Amiruddin, Samsul Bahri, Joko Hariyono, Heriansyah and Saiman. In the last season of Galatama, Daniel Roekito replaced Andi Teguh and Buyung Ismu was one of the most feared strikers in Indonesia.

=== Modern era and recent history (1994–present) ===
Led by H. Rahmadi HAS, they started the first season in the merged Liga Indonesia Premier Division by finishing as a semifinalist after being defeated by then champion Persib Bandung 1–0. In 1995, Daniel Roekito was replaced by Bulgarian coach A. Soso, the first foreign coach of the club. In 1996 Maryoto again joined Barito. In 1997, Maryoto and A. Soso became coaching duo. Between 1999 and 2002, Rudy William Keltjes and Tumpak Sihite coached Barito.

Because of financial problems, Barito Putera was relegated to the Liga Indonesia First Division in 2003. The crisis continued and they were relegated to the Liga Indonesia Second Division in 2004, despite the new coach Gusti Gazali. Finally in 2008, they won the Liga Indonesia Second Division, and earned promotion to the Liga Indonesia First Division. In 2010, Barito finished in top eight and was promoted to the Liga Indonesia Premier Division.

Ten years after relegation, they became champion of the 2011–12 Liga Indonesia Premier Division by beating Persita Tangerang 2–1, and returned to the highest domestic league. On June 14, 2015, H. Abdussamad Sulaiman Haji Basirun, the founder and chairman of Barito Putera, died in Jakarta.

In the 2021–22 Liga 1 season Barito finished above Persipura Jayapura although having the same points due to head-to-head rule after drawing 1–1 against Persib Bandung in the final matchday, but three seasons later they were relegated to Liga 2 despite beating PSIS Semarang 2–1 in the final matchday.

== Crest and stadium ==
=== Stadium ===
The club's home games are usually hosted at the 17 May Stadium, located in Banjarmasin.

For the 2013 Indonesia Super League, Barito Putera played their home matches at Demang Lehman Stadium. They used the 17 May Stadium for their home matches again in the 2015 Indonesia Super League, after the stadium's renovation finished in December 2014.

In 2019 Liga 1 season, the club moved back to the Demang Lehman Stadium because the 17 May Stadium was in the process of being renovated again.

== Culture ==
=== Supporters ===
Barito Putera has several supporter groups spread in South Kalimantan province and other Indonesian regions.

=== Derbies ===
- Derby Papadaan

The match of Barito Putera against Borneo F.C. is called the "Derby Papadaan", meaning the Brother/Family Derby.

- Derby Banua

The match of Barito Putera against Martapura F.C. is called "Derby Banua" because both of the teams are originally from South Kalimantan (Banua).

=== Retired number ===
- 88 (number of the club)

== Honours ==
- Galatama
  - Third Place: 1992–93
- Liga Indonesia Premier Division
  - Winners: 2011–12 (second-tier era)
  - Semi-finals: 1994–95 (first-tier era)
- Liga Indonesia Second Division
  - Winners: 2008–09

== Season-by-season records ==
Season	League									Top scorers	
Season	Division	P	W	D	L	GF	GA	Pts	Pos	Name	Goals
1988–89	Galatama	34	3	8	23	14	47	14	18th	(Indonesia) Sir Yusuf Huwae	4
1990	Galatama	34	8	10	16	30	47	26	16th	(Indonesia) Paulce Kia	8
1990–92	Galatama	37	13	6	8	37	25	42	7th	(Indonesia) Buyung Ismu	15
1992–93	Galatama	32	17	6	9	36	21	40	3rd	(Indonesia) Jalil Jamaluddin	11
1993–94	Galatama (East)	28	8	11	9	26	35	27	11th	(Indonesia) Paulce Kia	10
1994–95	Premier (East)	32	17	5	10	51	31	56	4th	(Indonesia) Joko Haryanto	17
1994–95	(2S Group A)	3	1	2	0	3	2	5	2nd	(Indonesia) Joko Haryanto	17
1994–95	(KO)^{1}	1	0	0	1	0	1	0	3rd	(Indonesia) Joko Haryanto	17
1995–96	Premier (East)	30	9	5	16	22	42	29	15th	—N/a	—N/a
1996–97	Premier (Central)	20	8	5	7	23	24	29	4th	(Indonesia) Rony Arifin	9
1996–97	(2S Group B)	3	0	1	2	2	5	1	4th	(Indonesia) Rony Arifin	9
1997–98	Premier (Central)	17	6	6	5	17	16	24	4th	(Indonesia) Rony Arifin	5
1998–99	Premier (East Grup 5)	8	3	1	4	8	10	10	3rd	(Indonesia) Bambang Harsoyo	6
1999–2000	Premier (East)	26	9	5	12	22	35	32	9th	(Indonesia) Bambang Harsoyo	10
2001	Premier (East)	25	12	7	6	32	22	43	4th	(Cameroon) Bako Sadissou	22
2001	(2S Group B)	3	0	0	3	2	5	0	4th	(Cameroon) Bako Sadissou	22
2002	Premier (East)	22	11	6	5	30	25	39	2nd	(Cameroon) Bako Sadissou	16
2002	(2S Group B)	3	0	0	3	2	6	0	4th	(Cameroon) Bako Sadissou	16
2003	Premier	38	9	11	18	30	52	38	20th	(France) Yao Eloi	7
2004	DIV 1 (East)	22	6	4	12	21	33	22	11th	(Indonesia) Iswadi Syukur	6
2005	DIV 1 (Group II)	16	4	6	6	13	19	18	8th	—N/a	—N/a
2006	DIV 2 (Grup III A)	8	2	2	3	6	10	9	3rd	(Indonesia) Sutrisno	2
2007	DIV 2 (Grup I A)	10	4	2	4	14	9	16	4th	(Indonesia) Syaifullah Nazar	3
2008–09	DIV 2 (Grup VI B)	6	4	1	1	10	6	13	1st	(Indonesia) Syaifullah Nazar	13
2008–09	(Round of 16)	2	2	0	0	9	2	6	1st	(Indonesia) Syaifullah Nazar	13
2008–09	(KO)^{3}	2	2	0	0	4	1	6	1st	(Indonesia) Syaifullah Nazar	13
2009–10	DIV 1 (Grup VIII)	6	6	0	0	16	1	18	1st	(Indonesia) Sartibi Darwis	5
2009–10	(Round of 24 Grup F)	2	2	0	0	8	2	6	1st	(Indonesia) Sartibi Darwis	5
2009–10	(Round of 16 Grup K)	3	2	1	0	6	1	7	1st	(Indonesia) Sartibi Darwis	5
2009–10	(Round of 8 Grup N)	3	0	2	1	6	7	2	4th	(Indonesia) Sartibi Darwis	5
2010–11	Premier (Grup 3)	24	11	2	11	30	23	35	4th	(Indonesia) Syaifullah Nazar	5
2011–12	Premier (1R Grup 2)	20	13	4	3	41	15	43	1st	(Liberia) Sackie Teah Doe	18
2011–12	(2R Group B)	3	1	1	1	6	3	4	2nd	(Liberia) Sackie Teah Doe	18
2011–12	(KO)^{4}	2	2	0	0	4	1	6	1st	(Liberia) Sackie Teah Doe	18
2013	ISL	34	15	9	10	55	40	54	6th	(Mali) Djibril Coulibaly	21
2014	ISL (West)	20	6	4	10	23	31	22	7th	(Liberia) James Lomell	9
2015	ISL^{5}	3	1	0	2	2	2	3	8th	(Indonesia) Agi Pratama (Indonesia) Talaohu Musafri	1
2016	ISC A^{6}	34	8	9	17	40	50	33	16th	(Brazil) Luiz Júnior	17
2017	Liga 1	34	15	8	11	48	44	53	7th	(Indonesia) Rizky Pora	10
2018	Liga 1	34	12	11	11	52	55	47	9th	(Indonesia) Samsul Arif	14
2019	Liga 1	34	11	10	13	45	51	43	13th	(Brazil) Rafael Silva	14
2020	Liga 1^{7}	3	0	1	2	2	7	1	17th	(Indonesia) Ambrizal Umanailo (Indonesia) Kahar Kalu	1
2021–22	Liga 1	34	9	9	16	41	49	36	15th	(Brazil) Bruno Matos (Brazil) Rafael Silva (Serbia) Aleksandar Rakić	5
2022–23	Liga 1	34	10	8	16	44	55	38	15th	(Brazil) Rafael Silva	9
2023–24	Liga 1	34	11	13	10	51	48	46	10th	(Brazil) Gustavo Tocantins	13
2024–25	Liga 1	34	8	10	16	42	57	34	17th	(Brazil) Lucas Morelatto	9
2025–26	Championship (East)	27	15	8	4	41	18	53	3rd	(Brazil) Renan Alves (Brazil) Alexsandro	8
2026–27	Championship (East)	27	0	0	0	0	0	0	TBD	–	–

Champion Runners-up 3rd place Promoted Relegated QR Qualification Round NP Not Participated

Note:
^1 3rd position with Pupuk Kaltim. Knockout rounds are only statistics, not counting points.
^2 PS Barito Putera did not take part in the league
^3 Knockout rounds are only statistics, not counting points.
^4 Knockout rounds are only statistics, not counting points.
^5 League was suspended.
^6 Indonesia Soccer Championship A is an unofficial competition replacing Indonesia Super League which was suspended.
^7 The season was abandoned due to the COVID-19 pandemic and declared void on 20 January 2021

== Clubs ranking ==
World clubs ranking

As of 4 August 2024

Current rank	Country	Club	Points
1822	(Romania)	FC Politehnica Iași (1945)	1274
1823	(Romania)	Voinţa Sibiu	1274
1824	(Indonesia)	Barito Putera	1274
1825	(Serbia)	FK Mladost GAT	1274
1826	(Poland)	GKS Bełchatów	1274

AFC clubs ranking

As of 4 August 2024

Current rank	Country	Club	Points
209	(Iran)	Fajr Sepasi	1274
210	(Uzbekistan)	Sogdiana Jizzakh	1274
211	(Indonesia)	Barito Putera	1274
212	(Saudi Arabia)	Al-Okhdood Club	1273
213	(Saudi Arabia)	Al-Orobah FC	1273

== Players ==
=== Current squad ===
As of August 2026

Note: Flags indicate national team as defined under FIFA eligibility rules; some limited exceptions apply. Players may hold more than one non-FIFA nationality.

No.	Pos.	Nation	Player
1	GK	IDN	Nor Halid
3	DF	IDN	Yuswanto Aditya
4	DF	IDN	Reviani
6	MF	IDN	Nugroho Santoso
7	DF	IDN	Gustur Cahyo
8	FW	IDN	Korneles Howay
9	FW	IDN	Dwi Rafi Angga
11	DF	IDN	Amiruddin
13	MF	IDN	Bayu Pradana
17	MF	IDN	Ferdiansyah
18	DF	IDN	Rahmat Nicko
19	FW	IDN	Bagus Kahfi
20	FW	IDN	Wildan Ramdhani
21	FW	IDN	Annur Hasnuryadi
24	MF	IDN	Aditiya Daffa
25	GK	IDN	Riki Pambudi

No.	Pos.	Nation	Player
26	MF	IDN	Rizky Pora (captain)
27	FW	IDN	Arya Satria
29	DF	IDN	Iqbal Gwijangge
30	MF	IDN	Gerard Edginatagi
31	FW	BRA	Murilo
34	MF	IDN	Aditia Mahpud
35	DF	IDN	Haudi Abdillah
36	DF	BRA	Renan Alves
55	DF	IDN	Bima Reksa
66	MF	IDN	Syamsul Rifai
71	MF	IDN	Aimar Iskandar
78	GK	IDN	Danda Rama
79	MF	JPN	Kodai Nagashima
86	GK	IDN	Satria Tama
91	DF	IDN	Dendi Maulana
96	MF	IDN	Muhammad Hidayat

== Management ==
Position	Name
President	(Indonesia) Hasnuryadi Sulaiman
Team manager	(Indonesia) M. Ikhsan Kamil
Assistant team manager	(Indonesia) Firman Dida Hasnuryadi
Technical director	(Indonesia) Frans Sinatra Huwae
Head coach	(Indonesia) Stefano Cugurra
Assistant coach	(Brazil) Kleber Dos Santos
Assistant coach	(Brazil) Francisco Torres
Assistant coach	(Indonesia) Isnan Ali
Physical coach	(Indonesia) Nurcholis Majid
Goalkeeper coach	(Brazil) Fábio Guedes
Analyst	(Indonesia) Sofyan Morhan
Doctor	(Indonesia) Rey Adi Wirawan
Physio	(Indonesia) Dian Efrianto Pambudi
Media officer	(Indonesia) Reyhan Marshall
Masseur	(Indonesia) Angga Bramansta Putranta
Kitman	(Indonesia) Fauzi

== All time ==
=== Managers/head coaches ===
Years	Name
1988–1990	(Indonesia) M. Hatta
1990–1994	(Indonesia) Yos Simon
1994–2004	(Indonesia) Rahmadi HAS
2004–2005	(Indonesia) Hasnuryadi Sulaiman
2005–2006	(Indonesia) Irwan Cahyadi
2006–2011	(Indonesia) Zainal Hadi
2011–2019	(Indonesia) Hasnuryadi Sulaiman
2020–2021	(Indonesia) Mundari Karya
2022	(Indonesia) Ikhsan Kamil
1988–1989	(Indonesia) Andi Lala
1989–1990	(Indonesia) Sukma Sejati
1990–1992	(Indonesia) Maryoto
1992–1993	(Indonesia) Andi Teguh
1993–1994	(Indonesia) Gusnul Yakin
1994–1996	(Indonesia) Daniel Roekito
1996–1997	(Bulgaria) Aleksandar Sasho
1997–1999	(Indonesia) Maryoto
1999–2000	(Indonesia) Rudy William Keltjes
2000–2001	(Indonesia) Daniel Roekito
2001	(Indonesia) Mundari Karya
2002	(Indonesia) Tumpak Uli Sihite
2003–2004	(Indonesia) Frans Sinatra Huwae
2004–2005	(Indonesia) Gusti Gazali
2006	(Indonesia) Lulut Kistono
2007–2015	(Indonesia) Salahudin
2016	(Indonesia) Mundari Karya
2017–2019	(Brazil) Jacksen F. Tiago
2019	(Indonesia) Yunan Helmi
2019–2021	(Indonesia) Djadjang Nurdjaman
2022	(Indonesia) Rahmad Darmawan
2022	(Serbia) Dejan Antonić
2022–2023	(Brazil) Rodney Goncalves
2023–2025	(Indonesia) Rahmad Darmawan
2025	(Brazil) Vitor Tinoco
2025–	(Brazil) Teco

=== Captains ===
Years	Name
1988–1990	(Indonesia) Muhammad Yusuf
1990–1999	(Indonesia) Frans Sinatra Huwae
2000–2001	(Indonesia) Bambang Harsoyo
2002	(Indonesia) Isnan Ali
2003–2005	(Indonesia) Ilham Romadhona
2006	(Indonesia) Aji Permana
2007	(Indonesia) Amir Yusuf Pohan
2008	(Indonesia) Sugeng Budiarso
2009	(Indonesia) Husin Mugni
2010	(Indonesia) Jufri Samad
2011–2012	(Indonesia) Agustiar Batubara
2013	(Turkmenistan) Mekan Nasyrow
2014	(Indonesia) Fathlul Rahman
2014	(Turkmenistan) Mekan Nasyrow
2015	(Indonesia) Muhammad Roby
2016	(Indonesia) Aditya Harlan
2017–	(Indonesia) Rizky Pora

=== Top scorers ===
Players in bold are still active in Club. Statistics are counted in official league matches

As of May 3rd 2026

Year	Player	Caps	Goals	Ratio
2001–02	(Cameroon) Sadissou Bako	40	39	0.97
2013–	(Indonesia) **Rizky Pora**	276	32	0.11
1994–98, 2002–03	(Indonesia) Joko Harianto	137	31	0.22
2019, 2021–23	(Brazil) Rafael Silva	59	28	0.47
2021–	(Brazil) **Renan Alves**	118	27	0.22
1996–00	(Indonesia) Bambang Harsoyo	73	24	0.32
2013	(Mali) Djibril Coulibaly	29	21	0.72
2023-24	(Brazil) Gustavo Tocantins	49	21	
2007-14	(Indonesia) Syaifullah Nazar	42	20	0.47
2018–19	(Indonesia) Samsul Arif	67	19	0.28
2011–13, 2019	(Liberia) Sackie Teah Doe	44	18	0.40
2017–18	(Brazil) Douglas Packer	61	18	0.29
2016	(Brazil) Luiz Júnior	30	17	0.56

== Sponsorship and kits ==
Period	Kit manufacturer	Main sponsor
1988–92	(Thailand) FBT	(Indonesia) Barito Pacific
1992–94	(Germany) Adidas	(United States) Kodak
1994–96	(Germany) Adidas	(United Kingdom) Dunhill
1996–97	(Germany) Adidas	(Netherlands) Kansas
1999–00	(United States) Reebok	
2000–03	(United States) Nike	(Indonesia) Bank Mandiri
2004–12	(Indonesia) Made by Club	(Indonesia) Hasnur Group
2012–14	(Indonesia) Specs	(Indonesia) Hasnur Group
2015–17	(Indonesia) RIORS	(Indonesia) Hasnur Group
2018	(England) Umbro	(Indonesia) Hasnur Group
2019–	(Indonesia) Made by club	(Indonesia) Hasnur Group

== Youth academy ==
Hasnur Group and Barito Putera supports the development of long-term sports by establishing Barito Putera Sports School (SOBP) which has begun its activities for football sports since April 2016 in the city of Banjarmasin. SOBP has been initiated as a positive distribution container for students ' hobbies, interests and talents. SOBP also directed to be an integral part of formal education in a well-managed school will bring positive influence and benefits for students, among them can hone skills, power creativity, soul sportsmanship and achievement.

== See also ==
- PS Barito Putera U-20
- List of football clubs in Indonesia
- Banjarmasin
