= 2014 Indonesian Inter Island Cup qualification squads =

Each team in the 2014 Indonesian Inter Island Cup qualification named a minimum of 18 players in their squad (three of whom were goalkeepers) by the deadline that Liga Indonesia determined was on 7 January 2014. Injury replacements were allowed until 24 hours before the team's first match.

== Sumatra zone ==
Sriwijaya

Manager: (Indonesia) Subangkit

Note: Flags indicate national team as defined under FIFA eligibility rules; some limited exceptions apply. Players may hold more than one non-FIFA nationality.

No.	Pos.	Nation	Player
5	DF	MLI	Abdoulaye Maïga
6	MF	IDN	Asri Akbar
7	MF	IDN	Siswanto
8	FW	IDN	Syamsir Alam
9	FW	BIH	Igor Radovanović
10	MF	IDN	Vendry Mofu
11	FW	IDN	Alan Martha
13	DF	IDN	Ahmad Sumardi
19	FW	IDN	Rishadi Fauzi
21	DF	IDN	Firdaus Ramadhan

No.	Pos.	Nation	Player
22	GK	IDN	Fauzi Toldo
24	MF	IDN	Hapit Ibrahim
30	DF	IDN	Jeki Arisandi
31	DF	TLS	Diogo Santos
32	DF	IDN	Maman Abdurahman
33	MF	CIV	Lancine Koné (captain)
37	FW	IDN	Rizky Dwi Ramadhana
85	GK	IDN	Selsius Gebze
93	FW	IDN	Anis Nabar

Semen Padang

Manager: (Indonesia) Jafri Sastra

Note: Flags indicate national team as defined under FIFA eligibility rules; some limited exceptions apply. Players may hold more than one non-FIFA nationality.

No.	Pos.	Nation	Player
2	DF	IDN	Novan Sasongko
4	DF	IDN	Aldi Rinaldi
5	DF	CMR	David Pagbe
6	MF	KOR	Yoo Hyun-Goo
7	MF	IDN	Rudi
8	MF	IDN	Eka Ramdani
9	MF	IDN	Muhammad Rizal
11	DF	IDN	Hengky Ardiles (captain)
12	MF	IDN	Jajang Paliama
13	DF	IDN	Wahyu Wijiastanto
16	DF	IDN	Saepulloh Maulana

No.	Pos.	Nation	Player
17	FW	IDN	Muhammad Nur Iskandar
18	MF	IDN	Ricky Ohorella
21	FW	ARG	Ezequiel González
22	GK	IDN	Jandia Eka Putra
23	MF	ARG	Esteban Vizcarra
26	DF	IDN	Septia Hadi
27	FW	IDN	Fahriza Dillah
28	MF	IDN	Safrial Irfandi
31	GK	IDN	Fakhrurrazi
99	FW	IDN	Airlangga Sutjipto

== Java zone ==
=== Group 1 ===
Persib Bandung

Manager: (Indonesia) Djajang Nurdjaman

Note: Flags indicate national team as defined under FIFA eligibility rules; some limited exceptions apply. Players may hold more than one non-FIFA nationality.

No.	Pos.	Nation	Player
1	GK	IDN	M. Natsir Fadhil Mahbudy
3	DF	MNE	Vladimir Vujović
6	DF	IDN	Tony Sucipto
7	MF	IDN	Atep Rizal
8	MF	IDN	Muhammad Taufiq
10	MF	MLI	Makan Konaté
11	MF	IDN	Rudiyana
12	GK	IDN	Shahar Ginanjar
13	DF	IDN	Muhammad Agung Pribadi
15	MF	IDN	Firman Utina (captain)
16	DF	IDN	Achmad Jufriyanto

No.	Pos.	Nation	Player
17	FW	IDN	Ferdinand Sinaga
18	DF	IDN	Jajang Sukmara
19	FW	IDN	Sigit Hermawan
21	FW	MLI	Djibril Coulibaly
22	DF	IDN	Supardi Nasir
23	MF	IDN	Muhammad Ridwan
24	MF	IDN	Hariono
28	DF	IDN	Abdul Rahman Sulaiman
78	GK	IDN	I Made Wirawan
82	FW	IDN	Tantan

Pelita Bandung Raya

Manager: (Serbia) Dejan Antonić

Note: Flags indicate national team as defined under FIFA eligibility rules; some limited exceptions apply. Players may hold more than one non-FIFA nationality.

No.	Pos.	Nation	Player
1	GK	IDN	Alfonsius Kelvan
2	DF	IDN	Saddam Tenang
3	DF	IDN	Chairul Rifan
4	DF	IDN	Mokhamad Syaifuddin
6	DF	IDN	Dias Angga Putra
7	MF	IDN	Rafid Lestaluhu
11	MF	IDN	Agus Indra Kurniawan
12	GK	LAT	Deniss Romanovs
14	MF	IDN	Muhammad Arsyad
16	DF	IDN	Hermawan
19	MF	IDN	Wawan Febrianto
20	FW	IDN	Bambang Pamungkas
22	DF	IDN	Wildansyah
23	MF	IDN	Kim Kurniawan

No.	Pos.	Nation	Player
24	DF	SRB	Boban Nikolić
25	GK	IDN	Raden Galuh
29	FW	IDN	Talaohu Musafri
30	DF	IDN	Nova Arianto (player coach)
32	FW	ARG	Gaston Castaño (captain)
42	DF	IDN	Riyandi Ramadhana
47	MF	IDN	Anggo Julian
86	MF	IDN	Basri Lohy
88	MF	IDN	Rizky Pellu
87	DF	IDN	Fariz Dinata
91	MF	IDN	David Laly
93	MF	IDN	Dolly Gultom
94	MF	IDN	Imam Pathuroman
99	FW	IDN	Nunung Dwi Cahyo

Persijap Jepara

Manager: (Malaysia) Raja Isa

Note: Flags indicate national team as defined under FIFA eligibility rules; some limited exceptions apply. Players may hold more than one non-FIFA nationality.

No.	Pos.	Nation	Player
4	DF	BRA	Evaldo Silva (captain)
5	DF	IDN	Danial
7	FW	IDN	Kornelis Kaimu
9	FW	IDN	Noor Hadi
10	MF	IDN	Ahmad Rajendra
11	FW	CMR	Christian Lenglolo
12	MF	IDN	Muhammad Fauzan Jamal
14	MF	IDN	Khanif Muhajirin
15	DF	IDN	M. Fatkhul Manan
16	DF	IDN	Sugiono
18	MF	IDN	Ahmad Noviandani

No.	Pos.	Nation	Player
20	MF	IDN	Diva Tarkas
24	DF	IDN	Anam Syahrul Fitrianto
27	DF	IDN	Murwanto
29	DF	IDN	Catur Rintang
32	MF	IDN	Slamet Riyadi
35	MF	IDN	Ahmad Buchori
37	MF	IDN	Lucky Oktavianto
41	FW	IDN	Yanuarius Kahol
82	GK	IDN	Danang Wihatmoko
88	GK	IDN	Dimas Galih Pratama
89	GK	IDN	Dedi Heryanto

Persita Tangerang

Manager: (Moldova) Arcan Iurie

Note: Flags indicate national team as defined under FIFA eligibility rules; some limited exceptions apply. Players may hold more than one non-FIFA nationality.

No.	Pos.	Nation	Player
1	GK	IDN	Mukti Ali Raja
2	MF	CMR	Mbom Julian
3	DF	CHI	Luis Durán (captain)
5	MF	IDN	Hari Habrian
6	DF	IDN	Valentino Telaubun
8	MF	IDN	Jalwandi
9	FW	IDN	Sirvi Arvani
10	FW	JPN	Kenji Adachihara
11	FW	IDN	Dibyo Previan
12	DF	IDN	Gilang Angga
14	DF	IDN	Gusripen Efendi
15	DF	IDN	Windu Hanggono Putra
19	MF	IDN	Irvan Mofu

No.	Pos.	Nation	Player
21	MF	IDN	Mahadirga Lasut
22	MF	IDN	Ganjar Mukti
23	MF	IDN	Maman
25	GK	IDN	Denis Suprianto
27	MF	IDN	Zikri Akbar
28	GK	IDN	Yogi Triyana
29	MF	IDN	Wijay
32	MF	IDN	Ronald Meosiau
42	DF	IDN	F.X. Yanuar
99	FW	CHI	Cristian Carrasco
—	DF	IDN	Ledi Utomo
—	FW	IDN	Ismail Haris
—	FW	IDN	Sansan Fauzi

=== Group 2 ===
Arema Cronous

Manager: (Indonesia) Suharno

Note: Flags indicate national team as defined under FIFA eligibility rules; some limited exceptions apply. Players may hold more than one non-FIFA nationality.

No.	Pos.	Nation	Player
1	GK	IDN	Kurnia Meiga
21	GK	IDN	I Made Wardana
31	GK	IDN	Achmad Kurniawan
36	GK	IDN	Utam Rusdiana
2	DF	IDN	Purwaka Yudhi
6	DF	CMR	Thierry Gathuessi
7	DF	IDN	Benny Wahyudi
23	DF	IDN	Gilang Ginarsa
32	DF	IDN	Victor Igbonefo
39	DF	IDN	Ega Wastita
45	DF	IDN	Yericho Christiantoko
53	DF	IDN	Munhar
87	DF	IDN	Johan Alfarizi

No.	Pos.	Nation	Player
8	MF	ARG	Gustavo López
17	MF	IDN	Hendro Siswanto
14	MF	IDN	Arif Suyono
19	MF	IDN	Ahmad Bustomi (captain)
44	MF	IDN	I Gede Sukadana
77	MF	IDN	Juan Revi
88	MF	IDN	Irsyad Maulana
9	FW	BRA	Beto
10	FW	IDN	Cristian Gonzáles
11	FW	IDN	Samsul Arif
15	FW	IDN	Sunarto
16	FW	IDN	Qischil Gandrum
41	FW	IDN	Dendi Santoso

Persepam Madura United

Manager: (Indonesia) Daniel Roekito

Note: Flags indicate national team as defined under FIFA eligibility rules; some limited exceptions apply. Players may hold more than one non-FIFA nationality.

No.	Pos.	Nation	Player
1	GK	IDN	Syaifudin
7	MF	IDN	Ishak Djober
8	MF	COL	Raúl Asprilla
9	MF	CMR	Guy Junior Ondoua
10	MF	IDN	Slamet Nurcahyono
11	MF	IDN	Rossy Noprihanis
14	DF	IDN	Achmad Rifai
15	MF	IDN	Khoirul Mashuda
16	DF	IDN	Denny Rumba
17	MF	IDN	Busari
18	FW	PAR	Silvio Escobar

No.	Pos.	Nation	Player
21	MF	IDN	Ade Suhendra
22	FW	IDN	Febri Setiadi Hamzah
24	DF	IDN	Michael Orah
26	DF	IDN	Fachrudin Aryanto
27	DF	IDN	Firly Apriansyah
28	DF	IDN	Aditya Putra Dewa
29	MF	CMR	Alain N'Kong
32	DF	AUS	Aboubakar Sillah
35	GK	IDN	Firmansyah
50	GK	IDN	Geri Mandagi
96	FW	IDN	Zaenal Arif (captain)

Persela Lamongan

Manager: (Indonesia) Eduard Tjong

Note: Flags indicate national team as defined under FIFA eligibility rules; some limited exceptions apply. Players may hold more than one non-FIFA nationality.

No.	Pos.	Nation	Player
1	GK	IDN	Choirul Huda (captain)
2	MF	IDN	Zaenal Arifin
3	DF	IDN	Zainal Abidin
4	MF	IDN	Muhammad Radikal Idealis
5	DF	IDN	Taufiq Kasrun
6	DF	IDN	Suroso
7	MF	IDN	Arif Ariyanto
9	FW	BRA	Addison Alves
10	MF	MNE	Srđan Lopičić
11	MF	IDN	Catur Pamungkas
13	FW	IDN	Bijahil Chalwa

No.	Pos.	Nation	Player
14	DF	IDN	Dodok Anang Zuanto
15	DF	SVK	Roman Golian
16	GK	IDN	Roni Tri Prasnanto
17	MF	IDN	Dhanu Rosadhe
19	DF	IDN	Wismoyo Widhistio
22	FW	IDN	Mario Rokhmanto
30	DF	IDN	Eky Taufik Febriyanto
31	MF	IDN	Feri Ariawan
33	DF	IDN	Burhanudin Nihe
39	FW	IDN	Agung Suprayogi
99	FW	IDN	Rudy Santoso

Persija Jakarta

Manager: (Indonesia) Benny Dollo

Note: Flags indicate national team as defined under FIFA eligibility rules; some limited exceptions apply. Players may hold more than one non-FIFA nationality.

No.	Pos.	Nation	Player
3	DF	IDN	Dany Saputra
7	MF	IDN	Ramdhani Lestaluhu
8	MF	IDN	Egi Melgiansyah
9	MF	IDN	Rudi Setiawan
11	FW	IDN	Rachmat Afandi
13	DF	IDN	Firmansyah
14	DF	IDN	Ismed Sofyan
15	DF	BRA	Fabiano Beltrame (captain)
17	MF	IDN	Defri Rizky
19	FW	IDN	Agung Supriyanto
21	MF	IDN	Amarzukih
23	DF	IDN	Victor Pae

No.	Pos.	Nation	Player
25	FW	ARG	Mario Costas
26	GK	IDN	Andritany Ardhiyasa
27	MF	IDN	Feri Komul
28	DF	IDN	Ngurah Nanak
29	GK	IDN	Adixi Lenzivio
32	MF	NEP	Rohit Chand
33	DF	IDN	Syahrizal Syahbuddin
35	GK	IDN	Daryono
77	MF	IDN	Abduh Lestaluhu
88	MF	IDN	Elie Aiboy
—	DF	IDN	Mardiansyah

=== Group 3 ===
Persebaya ISL (Bhayangkara)

Manager: (Indonesia) Rahmad Darmawan

Note: Flags indicate national team as defined under FIFA eligibility rules; some limited exceptions apply. Players may hold more than one non-FIFA nationality.

No.	Pos.	Nation	Player
1	GK	IDN	Yandri Pitoy
3	DF	IDN	Vava Mario Yagalo
4	DF	IDN	Ricardo Salampessy
6	MF	IDN	Achmad Hisyam Tolle
10	FW	IDN	Greg Nwokolo (captain)
11	MF	IDN	Dedi Kusnandar
12	GK	IDN	Ferry Rotinsulu
18	MF	IDN	Firmansyah Aprillianto
20	DF	IDN	Novri Setiawan
21	MF	IDN	Ari Supriatna
22	MF	IDN	Fandi Eko Utomo

No.	Pos.	Nation	Player
23	DF	IDN	Leo Saputra
25	MF	IDN	Manahati Lestusen
26	MF	IDN	Alfin Tuasalamony
29	DF	IDN	Ambrizal
30	MF	CMR	Patrice Nzekou
32	FW	SGP	Agu Casmir
41	DF	CMR	Daniel Moncharé
55	FW	CMR	Pacho Kenmogne
59	DF	IDN	Hasyim Kipuw
81	MF	IDN	Muhammad Ilham

Gresik United

Manager: (Indonesia) Agus Yuwono

Note: Flags indicate national team as defined under FIFA eligibility rules; some limited exceptions apply. Players may hold more than one non-FIFA nationality.

No.	Pos.	Nation	Player
2	DF	IDN	Handi Ramdhan
3	DF	IDN	Lan Bastian
5	DF	BRA	Otávio Dutra
6	DF	IDN	Dedi Indra Sampurna
7	MF	IDN	David Faristian
9	MF	IDN	Jeky Pasarela
12	MF	IDN	Legimin Raharjo
13	DF	IDN	Aries Tuansyah
17	MF	IDN	Elthon Maran
18	MF	JPN	Shohei Matsunaga

No.	Pos.	Nation	Player
19	MF	IDN	Jimmy Suparno
20	GK	IDN	Sukasto Efendi
23	DF	IDN	Mahyadi Panggabean (captain)
24	MF	IDN	Fajar Handika
27	MF	IDN	Kacung Khoirul
29	FW	SEN	Pape N'Diaye
32	DF	IDN	Markus Bachtiar
50	MF	IDN	Reza Mustofa
77	GK	IDN	Hery Prasetyo
86	GK	IDN	Sandi Firmansyah

Persiba Bantul

Manager: (Indonesia) Sajuri Sahid (caretaker)

Note: Flags indicate national team as defined under FIFA eligibility rules; some limited exceptions apply. Players may hold more than one non-FIFA nationality.

No.	Pos.	Nation	Player
1	GK	IDN	Wahyu Tri Nugroho
3	DF	IDN	Anwarudin
4	DF	BRA	Eduardo Bizarro (captain)
5	DF	IDN	Ramadhan Saputra
6	DF	IDN	Yohan Ibo
7	MF	IRI	Javad Moradi
8	MF	IDN	Johan Manaji
9	FW	PAR	Alberto Paredes
10	FW	IDN	Muhammad Isnaini
11	MF	IDN	Mochammad Solechudin
12	MF	IDN	Jejen Zainal Abidin
13	MF	IDN	Bayu Pradana

No.	Pos.	Nation	Player
15	MF	IDN	Muhammad Aulia Ardli
17	DF	IDN	Saralim
18	DF	IDN	Hery Prasetyo
19	DF	IDN	Slamet Widodo
20	GK	IDN	Andi Setiawan
21	GK	IDN	Muhammad Yasir
22	MF	IDN	Rian Wahyu
24	DF	IDN	Didik Ariyanto
26	DF	IDN	Aidin Elmi
27	FW	IDN	Ugik Sugiyanto
28	MF	IDN	Majid Mony
31	MF	IDN	Yosep Marudof

Persik Kediri

Manager: (Indonesia) Aris Budi Sulistyo (caretaker)

Note: Flags indicate national team as defined under FIFA eligibility rules; some limited exceptions apply. Players may hold more than one non-FIFA nationality.

No.	Pos.	Nation	Player
3	DF	IDN	Ahmad Zahrul Huda
4	DF	IDN	Syaiful Indra Cahya
5	DF	IDN	Sofyan Effendi
6	MF	IDN	Asep Berlian
7	FW	IDN	Dimas Galih
8	MF	IDN	Jefri Dwi Hadi
10	FW	PAR	Claudio Luis
11	FW	LBR	Keido Toure
13	MF	IDN	Faris Aditama
15	DF	IDN	Slamet Sampurno
16	MF	IDN	Rendy Irawan

No.	Pos.	Nation	Player
17	MF	IDN	Yayan Andhy
24	MF	IDN	Fachtul Ichya
32	DF	NGR	Michael Onwatuegwu
39	DF	IDN	Asep Budi Santoso
44	MF	IDN	Tamsil
50	GK	IDN	Wahyudi
68	GK	IDN	Usman Pribadi
75	DF	IDN	Kusnul Yuli (captain)
90	FW	PAR	Beto
91	GK	IDN	Teddy Heri
99	FW	IDN	Dicky Firasat

== Kalimantan zone ==
Barito Putera

Manager: (Indonesia) Salahudin

Note: Flags indicate national team as defined under FIFA eligibility rules; some limited exceptions apply. Players may hold more than one non-FIFA nationality.

No.	Pos.	Nation	Player
1	GK	IDN	Dedi Iman
5	DF	CMR	Abanda Herman
6	DF	IDN	Agus Cima
7	FW	IDN	Yosua Pahabol
8	MF	IDN	Amirul Mukminin
9	FW	IDN	Yongki Aribowo
10	MF	LBR	James Koko Lomell
11	DF	IDN	M. Rizki Mirzamah
13	MF	IDN	Lucky Wahyu
14	DF	IDN	Fathlul Rahman (captain)
17	MF	IDN	Syahroni

No.	Pos.	Nation	Player
18	DF	IDN	Guntur Ariyadi
19	DF	IDN	Supriyadi
20	GK	IDN	Aditya Harlan
22	MF	IDN	Zamrony Dun
23	MF	IDN	Dedi Hartono
24	FW	SLE	Shaka Bangura
25	DF	KOR	Ha Dae-Won
26	MF	IDN	Rizky Ripora
29	MF	IDN	Ana Supriatna
43	FW	IDN	Syaifullah Nazar
33	GK	IDN	Joko Ribowo

Mitra Kukar

Manager: (Sweden) Stefan Hansson

Note: Flags indicate national team as defined under FIFA eligibility rules; some limited exceptions apply. Players may hold more than one non-FIFA nationality.

No.	Pos.	Nation	Player
3	DF	IDN	Zulkifli Syukur (captain)
4	DF	IDN	Abdul Gamal
5	MF	IDN	Hendra Ridwan
7	MF	IDN	Zulham Zamrun
8	MF	IDN	Raphael Maitimo
11	MF	IDN	Bima Sakti
12	DF	IDN	Ali Surahman
13	DF	IDN	Gunawan Dwi Cahyo
14	MF	IDN	Fadil Sausu
16	FW	IDN	Misriadi Didiet
18	FW	IDN	Anindito Wahyu

No.	Pos.	Nation	Player
19	MF	IDN	Zulvin Zamrun
20	DF	KOR	Park Chul-Hyung
21	GK	IDN	Joice Sorongan
24	DF	IDN	Diego Muhammad
25	FW	IDN	Yogi Rahadian
27	DF	IDN	Dedi Gusmawan
33	GK	IDN	Dian Agus Prasetyo
44	DF	BRA	Reinaldo Lobo
50	MF	LBR	Erick Weeks Lewis
77	DF	IDN	Danan Puspito

Persiba Balikpapan

Manager: (Indonesia) Jaya Hartono

Note: Flags indicate national team as defined under FIFA eligibility rules; some limited exceptions apply. Players may hold more than one non-FIFA nationality.

No.	Pos.	Nation	Player
1	GK	IDN	Fauzal Mubaraq
3	DF	IDN	Muhammad Kamri
5	DF	IDN	Fandy Mochtar
7	MF	IDN	Arifki Eka Putra
8	DF	IDN	Alfian Habibi
9	FW	PAR	Carlos Ozuna
10	FW	LBR	Ansu Toure
11	MF	IDN	Fengky Turnando
12	MF	IDN	Mustaid Billah
14	MF	COL	Yairo Balanta
15	DF	IDN	Joko Sidik
17	FW	IDN	Riski Novriansyah

No.	Pos.	Nation	Player
18	DF	IDN	Ahmad Maulana Putra
19	FW	IDN	Aris Alfiansyah
22	DF	IDN	Rendy Siregar
26	MF	IDN	Muhammad Bahtiar
27	MF	IDN	Baso Bintang
30	DF	MLI	Franck Bezi
32	DF	IDN	Absor Fauzi
44	MF	IDN	Abdul Rahman
59	GK	IDN	Wawan Hendrawan
83	MF	IDN	Ahmad Sembiring
87	DF	IDN	Yudi Khoerudin

Putra Samarinda

Manager: (Indonesia) Mundari Karya

Note: Flags indicate national team as defined under FIFA eligibility rules; some limited exceptions apply. Players may hold more than one non-FIFA nationality.

No.	Pos.	Nation	Player
1	GK	IDN	Dwi Kuswanto
2	DF	IDN	Wahyu Kristanto
3	DF	IDN	Mochamad Mari Siswanto
5	MF	IDN	Indra
7	MF	IDN	Radiansyah
9	MF	IRI	Ebrahim Loveinian
11	DF	IDN	Yus Arfandy Dja'far
12	FW	IDN	Lerby Eliandry
16	DF	IDN	Muhammad Roby (captain)
17	MF	IDN	Joko Sasongko
19	MF	IDN	Fajar Legian Siswanto

No.	Pos.	Nation	Player
21	DF	IDN	Sandi
22	MF	IDN	Sultan Samma
23	MF	IDN	Bayu Gatra
25	FW	IDN	Aldeir Makatindu
33	GK	IDN	Rivki Mokodompit
45	DF	IDN	Erik Setiawan
77	MF	IDN	Loudry Setiawan
86	MF	IDN	Engelbert Sani
87	FW	MNE	Ilija Spasojević
99	FW	CMR	Jean Paul Boumsong

== Papua-Sulawesi zone ==
Persipura Jayapura

Manager: (Brazil) Jacksen F. Tiago

Note: Flags indicate national team as defined under FIFA eligibility rules; some limited exceptions apply. Players may hold more than one non-FIFA nationality.

No.	Pos.	Nation	Player
1	GK	KOR	Yoo Jae-Hoon
3	DF	IDN	Fandry Imbiri
5	MF	IDN	Izaac Wanggai
8	MF	KOR	Lim Joon-Sik
11	MF	IDN	Imanuel Wanggai
12	MF	IDN	Nelson Alom
13	MF	IDN	Ian Kabes
14	DF	IDN	Ruben Sanadi
15	MF	IDN	Gerald Pangkali
16	DF	IDN	Daniel Tata
17	FW	IDN	Yohanes Pahabol

No.	Pos.	Nation	Player
18	FW	IDN	Ricky Kayame
20	GK	IDN	Ferdiansyah
21	FW	IDN	Yustinus Pae
24	FW	LBR	Boakay Eddie Foday (captain)
25	FW	IDN	Titus Bonai
27	GK	IDN	Dede Sulaiman
28	DF	IDN	Andri Ibo
33	FW	IDN	Lukas Mandowen
44	DF	IDN	Yohanis Tjoe
45	DF	IDN	Bio Paulin
49	MF	IDN	Jaelani Arey

Perseru Serui

Manager: (Indonesia) Robby Maruanaya

Note: Flags indicate national team as defined under FIFA eligibility rules; some limited exceptions apply. Players may hold more than one non-FIFA nationality.

No.	Pos.	Nation	Player
3	DF	CMR	Seme Pattrick
5	DF	IDN	Liston Fonataba (captain)
6	MF	TOG	Ali Khaddafi
7	MF	IDN	Stevie Bonsapia
10	MF	IDN	Jefry Haay
11	FW	IDN	Yoksan Ama
15	GK	IDN	Teguh Amiruddin
16	DF	IDN	Michael Ditubun
17	DF	IDN	Alexander Yarangga
18	DF	IDN	Bilibig Dian Mahrus

No.	Pos.	Nation	Player
19	FW	NGR	Sunday Austin Oboh
20	GK	IDN	Galih Firmansyah
21	DF	IDN	Agus Durmaturia
22	MF	IDN	Arthur Bonai
25	MF	IDN	Cornelius Geddy
26	FW	IDN	Alan Aronggear
33	MF	IDN	Onny Marthen Sibi
38	DF	IDN	Tonny Roy Ayomi
87	MF	IDN	Oktovianus Maniani
88	FW	IDN	Ferdinando Mote

Persiram Raja Ampat

Manager: (Brazil) Gomes de Olivera

Note: Flags indicate national team as defined under FIFA eligibility rules; some limited exceptions apply. Players may hold more than one non-FIFA nationality.

No.	Pos.	Nation	Player
1	GK	IDN	Deny Marcel
2	DF	IDN	Frans Freno Sauyai
7	MF	IDN	Gideon V. Way
8	DF	LBR	Kubay Quaiyan (captain)
9	FW	IDN	Permenas Iwanggin
10	FW	NGR	Osas Saha
11	FW	IDN	Moses Banggo
12	DF	IDN	Leonard Tupamahu
14	MF	CMR	Mbida Messi
16	GK	IDN	Wempy Obure
17	FW	IDN	Penias Fakdawer
19	MF	IDN	Ronald Setmob

No.	Pos.	Nation	Player
20	GK	IDN	Galih Sudaryono
21	DF	IDN	Edison Ames
22	DF	IDN	Sa Anun Al Qadry
26	DF	IDN	Ortizan Solossa
27	DF	IDN	Arifin Ginuni
28	MF	IDN	Steven Imbiri
30	MF	IDN	Elvis Herawan
57	MF	IDN	Imanuel Padwa
87	DF	IDN	Errol Simunapendi
88	MF	IDN	David Uron
90	FW	IDN	Mario Aibekob

PSM Makassar

Manager: (Germany) Jorg Steinburnner

Note: Flags indicate national team as defined under FIFA eligibility rules; some limited exceptions apply. Players may hold more than one non-FIFA nationality.

No.	Pos.	Nation	Player
2	DF	IDN	Hendra Wijaya
3	DF	IDN	Rasul Zainuddin
4	DF	IDN	I Ketut Mahendra
6	DF	CHI	Cristian Febre
7	MF	SVK	Roman Chmelo
8	MF	IDN	Syamsul Chaeruddin
10	FW	IDN	Andi Oddang
11	MF	IDN	Ponaryo Astaman (captain)
13	MF	IDN	Kurniawan Karman
14	DF	IDN	Kaharuddin
15	DF	IDN	Yusuf Hamzah
17	MF	IDN	Rasyid Bakri
18	DF	IDN	Supandi
20	GK	IDN	Ngurah Komang Arya

No.	Pos.	Nation	Player
21	DF	IDN	Muhammad Aswar Syamsuddin
22	MF	IDN	Ardan Aras
24	DF	IDN	Muhammad Jufri
26	DF	IDN	Djayusman Triasdi
27	FW	IDN	Qifly Tamarah
28	GK	IDN	Markus Haris Maulana
29	FW	IDN	Muhammad Rahmat
30	MF	ARG	Robertino Pugliara
31	MF	IDN	Agung Prasetyo
32	FW	IDN	Abdul Rahman
77	DF	IDN	Rachmat Latief
—	GK	IDN	A.M. Guntur
—	FW	IDN	Febrianto Hamsyah
