= 2014 Indonesian Inter Island Cup squads =

Each team in the 2014 Indonesian Inter Island Cup named a minimum of 18 players in their squads (three of whom were goalkeepers) by the deadline that Liga Indonesia determined was on 7 January 2014. Injury replacements were allowed until 24 hours before the team's first match.

== Group A ==
=== Sriwijaya ===
Manager: (Indonesia) Subangkit

Note: Flags indicate national team as defined under FIFA eligibility rules; some limited exceptions apply. Players may hold more than one non-FIFA nationality.

No.	Pos.	Nation	Player
5	DF	MLI	Abdoulaye Maïga
6	MF	IDN	Asri Akbar
7	MF	IDN	Siswanto
8	FW	IDN	Syamsir Alam
10	MF	IDN	Vendry Mofu
11	FW	IDN	Alan Martha
13	DF	IDN	Ahmad Sumardi
19	FW	IDN	Rishadi Fauzi
21	DF	IDN	Firdaus Ramadhan
22	GK	IDN	Fauzi Toldo

No.	Pos.	Nation	Player
23	GK	IDN	Teja Paku Alam
24	MF	IDN	Hapit Ibrahim
30	DF	IDN	Jeki Arisandi
31	DF	TLS	Diogo Santos
32	DF	IDN	Maman Abdurahman
33	MF	CIV	Lancine Koné (captain)
37	FW	IDN	Rizky Dwi Ramadhana
85	GK	IDN	Selsius Gebze
93	FW	IDN	Anis Nabar

=== Arema Cronous ===
Manager: (Indonesia) Suharno

Note: Flags indicate national team as defined under FIFA eligibility rules; some limited exceptions apply. Players may hold more than one non-FIFA nationality.

No.	Pos.	Nation	Player
1	GK	IDN	Kurnia Meiga
21	GK	IDN	I Made Wardana
31	GK	IDN	Achmad Kurniawan
36	GK	IDN	Utam Rusdiana
2	DF	IDN	Purwaka Yudhi
6	DF	CMR	Thierry Gathuessi
7	DF	IDN	Benny Wahyudi
23	DF	IDN	Gilang Ginarsa
32	DF	IDN	Victor Igbonefo
39	DF	IDN	Ega Wastita
45	DF	IDN	Yericho Christiantoko
53	DF	IDN	Munhar
87	DF	IDN	Johan Alfarizi

No.	Pos.	Nation	Player
8	MF	ARG	Gustavo López
17	MF	IDN	Hendro Siswanto
14	MF	IDN	Arif Suyono
19	MF	IDN	Ahmad Bustomi (captain)
44	MF	IDN	I Gede Sukadana
77	MF	IDN	Juan Revi
88	MF	IDN	Irsyad Maulana
9	FW	BRA	Beto
10	FW	IDN	Cristian Gonzáles
11	FW	IDN	Samsul Arif
15	FW	IDN	Sunarto
16	FW	IDN	Qischil Gandrum
41	FW	IDN	Dendi Santoso

=== Barito Putera ===
Manager: (Indonesia) Salahudin

Note: Flags indicate national team as defined under FIFA eligibility rules; some limited exceptions apply. Players may hold more than one non-FIFA nationality.

No.	Pos.	Nation	Player
5	DF	CMR	Abanda Herman
6	DF	IDN	Agus Cima
7	FW	IDN	Yosua Pahabol
8	MF	IDN	Amirul Mukminin
9	FW	IDN	Yongki Aribowo
10	MF	LBR	James Koko Lomell
11	DF	IDN	M. Rizki Mirzamah
13	MF	IDN	Lucky Wahyu
14	DF	IDN	Fathlul Rahman (captain)
15	DF	IDN	Ruben Wuarbanaran
17	MF	IDN	Syahroni
18	DF	IDN	Guntur Ariyadi

No.	Pos.	Nation	Player
19	DF	IDN	Supriyadi
20	GK	IDN	Aditya Harlan
21	GK	IDN	Dedi Iman
22	MF	IDN	Zamrony Dun
23	MF	IDN	Dedi Hartono
24	MF	SLE	Shaka Bangura
25	DF	KOR	Ha Dae-Won
26	MF	IDN	Rizky Ripora
33	GK	IDN	Joko Ribowo
43	FW	IDN	Syaifullah Nazar
69	MF	IDN	Ana Supriatna
99	MF	IDN	Tonnie Cusell

=== Perseru Serui ===
Manager: (Indonesia) Robby Maruanaya

Note: Flags indicate national team as defined under FIFA eligibility rules; some limited exceptions apply. Players may hold more than one non-FIFA nationality.

No.	Pos.	Nation	Player
3	DF	CMR	Seme Pattrick
5	DF	IDN	Liston Fonataba (captain)
6	MF	TOG	Ali Khaddafi
7	MF	IDN	Stevie Bonsapia
10	MF	IDN	Jefry Haay
11	FW	IDN	Yoksan Ama
13	MF	IDN	Franklin Rumbiak
15	GK	IDN	Teguh Amiruddin
16	DF	IDN	Michael Ditubun
17	DF	IDN	Alexander Yarangga
18	DF	IDN	Bilibig Dian Mahrus

No.	Pos.	Nation	Player
19	FW	NGR	Sunday Austin Oboh
20	GK	IDN	Galih Firmansyah
21	DF	IDN	Agus Durmaturia
22	MF	IDN	Arthur Bonai
25	MF	IDN	Cornelius Geddy
26	FW	IDN	Alan Aronggear
33	MF	IDN	Onny Marthen Sibi
38	DF	IDN	Tonny Roy Ayomi
87	MF	IDN	Oktovianus Maniani
88	FW	IDN	Ferdinando Mote

== Group B ==
=== Persib Bandung ===
Manager: (Indonesia) Djajang Nurdjaman

Note: Flags indicate national team as defined under FIFA eligibility rules; some limited exceptions apply. Players may hold more than one non-FIFA nationality.

No.	Pos.	Nation	Player
1	GK	IDN	M. Natsir Fadhil Mahbudy
3	DF	MNE	Vladimir Vujović
6	DF	IDN	Tony Sucipto
7	MF	IDN	Atep Rizal
9	FW	NGR	Udo Fortune
10	MF	MLI	Makan Konaté
11	MF	IDN	Rudiyana
12	GK	IDN	Shahar Ginanjar
13	DF	IDN	Muhammad Agung Pribadi
15	MF	IDN	Firman Utina (captain)

No.	Pos.	Nation	Player
16	DF	IDN	Achmad Jufriyanto
17	FW	IDN	Ferdinand Sinaga
18	DF	IDN	Jajang Sukmara
22	DF	IDN	Supardi Nasir
23	MF	IDN	Muhammad Ridwan
24	MF	IDN	Hariono
28	DF	IDN	Abdul Rahman Sulaiman
78	GK	IDN	I Made Wirawan
82	FW	IDN	Tantan

=== Persik Kediri ===
Manager: (Indonesia) Aris Budi Sulistyo (caretaker)

Note: Flags indicate national team as defined under FIFA eligibility rules; some limited exceptions apply. Players may hold more than one non-FIFA nationality.

No.	Pos.	Nation	Player
3	DF	IDN	Ahmad Zahrul Huda
4	DF	IDN	Syaiful Indra Cahya
5	DF	IDN	Sofyan Effendi
6	MF	IDN	Asep Berlian
7	FW	IDN	Dimas Galih
8	MF	IDN	Jefri Dwi Hadi
10	MF	PAR	Claudio Luis
13	MF	IDN	Faris Aditama
15	DF	IDN	Slamet Sampurno
16	MF	IDN	Rendy Irawan
17	MF	IDN	Yayan Andhy

No.	Pos.	Nation	Player
19	FW	IDN	Qischil Minny
24	MF	IDN	Fachtul Ichya
32	DF	NGR	Michael Onwatuegwu
39	DF	IDN	Asep Budi Santoso
44	MF	IDN	Tamsil
50	GK	IDN	Wahyudi
68	GK	IDN	Usman Pribadi
75	DF	IDN	Kusnul Yuli (captain)
90	FW	PAR	Beto
91	GK	IDN	Teddy Heri
99	FW	IDN	Dicky Firasat

=== Persiram Raja Ampat ===
Manager: (Brazil) Gomes de Olivera

Note: Flags indicate national team as defined under FIFA eligibility rules; some limited exceptions apply. Players may hold more than one non-FIFA nationality.

No.	Pos.	Nation	Player
1	GK	IDN	Deny Marcel
2	DF	IDN	Frans Freno Sauyai
7	MF	IDN	Gideon V. Way
8	DF	LBR	Kubay Quaiyan (captain)
9	FW	IDN	Permenas Iwanggin
10	FW	NGR	Osas Saha
11	FW	IDN	Moses Banggo
12	DF	IDN	Leonard Tupamahu
14	MF	CMR	Mbida Messi
16	GK	IDN	Wempy Obure
17	FW	IDN	Penias Fakdawer
19	MF	IDN	Ronald Setmob

No.	Pos.	Nation	Player
20	GK	IDN	Galih Sudaryono
21	DF	IDN	Edison Ames
22	DF	IDN	Sa Anun Al Qadry
26	DF	IDN	Ortizan Solossa
27	DF	IDN	Arifin Ginuni
28	MF	IDN	Steven Imbiri
30	MF	IDN	Elvis Herawan
57	MF	IDN	Imanuel Padwa
87	DF	IDN	Errol Simunapendi
88	MF	IDN	David Uron
90	FW	IDN	Mario Aibekob

=== Mitra Kukar ===
Manager: (Sweden) Stefan Hansson

Note: Flags indicate national team as defined under FIFA eligibility rules; some limited exceptions apply. Players may hold more than one non-FIFA nationality.

No.	Pos.	Nation	Player
3	DF	IDN	Zulkifli Syukur (captain)
4	DF	IDN	Abdul Gamal
5	MF	IDN	Hendra Ridwan
7	MF	IDN	Zulham Zamrun
8	MF	IDN	Raphael Maitimo
11	MF	IDN	Bima Sakti
12	DF	IDN	Ali Surahman
13	DF	IDN	Gunawan Dwi Cahyo
14	MF	IDN	Fadil Sausu
16	FW	IDN	Misriadi Didiet
18	FW	IDN	Anindito Wahyu

No.	Pos.	Nation	Player
19	MF	IDN	Zulvin Zamrun
20	DF	KOR	Park Chul-Hyung
21	GK	IDN	Joice Sorongan
22	FW	IDN	Tigam Alif Farisma
24	DF	IDN	Diego Muhammad
25	FW	IDN	Yogi Rahadian
27	DF	IDN	Dedi Gusmawan
33	GK	IDN	Dian Agus Prasetyo
44	DF	BRA	Reinaldo Lobo
50	MF	LBR	Erick Weeks Lewis
77	DF	IDN	Danan Puspito
