= 2011–12 Arema Indonesia season =

Arema Indonesia
2011–12 season
- Manager: Rendra Kresna
- Head coach: Wolfgang Pikal; Suharno
- Stadium: Kanjuruhan Stadium
- ISL: 12th
- Top goalscorer: League: Marcio Souza (8 goals); All: Marcio Souza (8 goals)

The 2011–12 Arema Indonesia season is Arema's 25th competitive season. The club will compete in Indonesia Super League. Arema Indonesia a professional football club based in Malang, East Java, Indonesia. The season covers the period from 1 December 2011 to 11 July 2012.

== Coaching staff ==
Position	Name
Head coach	(Indonesia) Suharno
Assistant coach	(Indonesia) Joko Susilo
Assistant coach	(Indonesia) Kuncoro
Goalkeeper coach	(Indonesia) Dwi Sasmianto

== Squad information ==
=== First Half ===
Note: Flags indicate national team as defined under FIFA eligibility rules; some limited exceptions apply. Players may hold more than one non-FIFA nationality.

No.	Pos.	Nation	Player
2	DF	IDN	Made Astawa
3	DF	CMR	Seme Pattrick (vice captain)
4	DF	IDN	Charis Yulianto (captain)
6	FW	IDN	Benny Kristian Saputra
7	MF	IDN	Firmansyah Aprilianto
8	FW	BRA	Marcio Souza
9	MF	IDN	Arif Ariyanto
11	MF	IDN	Catur Pamungkas
14	FW	IDN	Boy Jati Asmara
15	FW	ARG	Rodrigo Santoni
16	MF	KOR	Kim Yong Hee
18	FW	IDN	Dicky Firasat
19	MF	IDN	Ferry Aman Saragih

No.	Pos.	Nation	Player
20	DF	IDN	Kerry Yudhiono
22	DF	IDN	Waskito Sujarwoko
25	DF	IDN	Khusnul Yuli
28	GK	IDN	Rudi Ardiansyah
29	DF	IDN	Nurul Mauludi
30	GK	IDN	I Ngurah Komang Arya
32	DF	AUS	Steve Lewis Hesketh
33	GK	IDN	Dian Agus Prasetyo
43	GK	IDN	Benny Yoewanto Setya
45	FW	IDN	Agung Suprayogi
47	MF	IDN	Anggo Julian Hari Sapta
53	DF	IDN	Munhar
88	MF	IDN	Dudi Hidayat

=== Second Half ===
Note: Flags indicate national team as defined under FIFA eligibility rules; some limited exceptions apply. Players may hold more than one non-FIFA nationality.

No.	Pos.	Nation	Player
1	GK	IDN	Kurnia Meiga
3	DF	CMR	Seme Pattrick (vice captain)
4	DF	IDN	Charis Yulianto (captain)
6	DF	IDN	Johan Ibo
7	MF	IDN	Firmansyah Aprilianto
8	FW	SGP	Muhammad Ridhuan
9	MF	IDN	Arif Ariyanto
11	MF	IDN	Catur Pamungkas
12	MF	IDN	Hendro Siswanto
17	MF	CMR	Alain N'Kong
18	FW	IDN	Dicky Firasat
19	MF	IDN	Ferry Aman Saragih
22	DF	IDN	Waskito Sujarwoko

No.	Pos.	Nation	Player
25	DF	IDN	Khusnul Yuli
29	DF	IDN	Nurul Mauludi
31	GK	IDN	Achmad Kurniawan
32	DF	AUS	Steve Lewis Hesketh
37	DF	IDN	Sutikno
41	GK	IDN	Dendi Santoso
43	GK	IDN	Benny Yoewanto Setya
45	FW	IDN	Agung Suprayogi
53	DF	IDN	Munhar
78	FW	IDN	Sunarto
87	DF	IDN	Johan Alfarizi
99	FW	CMR	Herman Dzumafo Epandi

== Competitions ==
=== Overview ===
Competition	Record								Started round	Final position / round	First match	Last match
Competition	G	W	D	L	GF	GA	GD	Win %	Started round	Final position / round	First match	Last match
Indonesia Super League	34	10	8	16	45	51	−6	29.41	Matchday 1	12th	6 December 2011	11 July 2012
Total	34	10	8	16	45	51	−6	29.41				

Updated to match played 11 July 2012
Source: Competitions

=== Indonesia Super League ===
==== League table ====
Pos	Team	Pld	W	D	L	GF	GA	GD	Pts
10	Persidafon Dafonsoro	34	13	7	14	57	65	−8	46
11	Persisam Putra Samarinda	34	12	7	15	44	42	+2	43
12	Arema Indonesia	34	10	8	16	45	51	−6	38
13	PSPS Pekanbaru	34	11	5	18	40	54	−14	38
14	Persiram Raja Ampat (Note: Persijap Jepara, Persiraja Banda Aceh, Semen Padang, and Persiba Bantul withdrew from 2011–12 Indonesia Super League and moved to 2011–12 Indonesian Premier League, they were replaced by Persiram Raja Ampat, PSAP Sigli, PSMS Medan and Gresik United)	34	10	8	16	45	63	−18	38

Updated to match(es) played on 11 July 2012. Source: 2011–12 Super League table
Rules for classification: 1) points; 2) goal difference; 3) number of goals scored.

==== Results by round ====
Round	1	2	3	4	5	6	7	8	9	10	11	12	13	14	15	16	17	18	19	20	21	22	23	24	25	26	27	28	29	30	31	32	33	34
Ground	H	A	A	H	H	A	A	H	H	A	A	H	H	A	A	H	H	A	A	A	H	H	A	A	H	H	A	A	H	H	A	H	H	A
Result	L	L	L	D	L	L	D	W	D	L	D	W	D	L	L	L	W	L	L	L	W	W	L	L	W	W	D	D	W	W	L	W	D	L
Position	14	16	17	16	17	17	17	16	16	16	18	17	16	17	17	17	18	18	18	18							13	13	11	12	12	11	12	12
Points	0	0	0	1	1	1	2	5	6	6	7	10	11	11	11	11	14	14	14	14	17	20	20	20	23	26	27	28	31	34	34	37	38	38

Updated to match(es) played on 22 February 2026. Source:
A = Away; H = Home; W = Win; D = Draw; L = Loss; P = Postponed

==== Matches ====
Win Draw Loss

6 December 2011 1	Arema Indonesia	0–1	Persela Lamongan	Malang, East Java
			Costas 81'	Stadium: Kanjuruhan Stadium

10 December 2011 2	Persiba Balikpapan	2–1	Arema Indonesia	Balikpapan, East Borneo
	Adachihara 40'; Latief 73'		Souza 35'

17 December 2011 3	Gresik United	2–0	Arema Indonesia	Gresik, East Java
	Seyedeh 15'; Lommel 36'

4 January 2012 4	Arema Indonesia	2–2	Persiram Raja Ampat	Malang, East Java
	Saragih 29'; Patrick 89'		Boumsong 66'; Karubaba 88'	Stadium: Kanjuruhan Stadium

8 January 2012 5	Arema Indonesia	1–5	Sriwijaya FC	Malang, East Java
	Ariyanto 62'		Hilton Moreira 21', 37', 39'; Gumbs 85', 91'	Stadium: Kanjuruhan Stadium

13 January 2012 6	Persidafon Dafonsoro	2–1	Arema Indonesia	Jayapura, Papua
	Wanggai 25'; Cirelli 78'		Souza 48'

18 January 2012 7	Deltras Sidoarjo	3–3	Arema Indonesia	Sidoarjo, East Java
	Minny 12'; Dadic 16'; Joon 72'		Souza 10', 37', 91'	Stadium: Gelora Delta Stadium

22 January 2012 8	Arema Indonesia	2–1	PSMS Medan	Malang, East Java
	Souza 37' (pen.); Rahmad 57' (o.g.)		Saha 6'	Stadium: Kanjuruhan Stadium

28 January 2012 9	Arema Indonesia	0–0	PSAP Sigli	Malang, East Java
				Stadium: Kanjuruhan Stadium

1 February 2012 10	Persisam Samarinda	2–0	Arema Indonesia	Samarinda, East Borneo
	Aribowo 30'; Gonzales 35'			Stadium: Segiri Stadium

5 February 2012 11	Mitra Kukar	2–2	Arema Indonesia	Tenggarong, East Borneo
	Obric 17' (pen.); Anindito 50'		Patrick 7'; Souza 53'

16 February 2012 12	Arema Indonesia	2–0	PSPS Pekanbaru	Malang, East Java
	Firasat 21'; Ariyanto 51'			Stadium: Kanjuruhan Stadium

19 February 2012 13	Arema Indonesia	1–1	Persija Jakarta	Malang, East Java
	Precious 20' (o.g.)		Pamungkas 30'	Stadium: Kanjuruhan Stadium

11 March 2012 14	Pelita Jaya	2–1	Arema Indonesia	Karawang, West Java
	Sali 10'; Bajevski 75'		Suprayogi 88'

15 March 2012 15	Persib Bandung	2–0	Arema Indonesia	Bandung, West Java
	Radovic 19'; Sukmara 77'

25 March 2012 16	Arema Indonesia	1–2	Persipura Jayapura	Malang, East Java
	Aprillianto 48'		Krangar 6'; Goncalves 92'	Stadium: Kanjuruhan Stadium

29 March 2012 17	Arema Indonesia	2–1	Persiwa Wamena	Malang, East Java
	Saragih 5'; Souza 49'		Foday 62'	Stadium: Kanjuruhan Stadium

13 April 2012 18	Persiwa Wamena	1–0	Arema Indonesia	Wamena, Papua
	Lewis 31'

17 April 2012 19	Persipura Jayapura	2–1	Arema Indonesia	Jayapura, Papua
	Goncalves 55' (pen.), 56' (pen.)		N'Kong 8'

21 April 2012 20	Persiram Raja Ampat	1–0	Arema Indonesia	Raja Ampat, Papua
	Silva 31'

25 April 2012 21	Arema Indonesia	2–1	Persib Bandung	Malang, East Java
	Dzumafo 19'; Ariyanto 56'		Sucipto 93'	Stadium: Kanjuruhan Stadium

28 April 2012 22	Arema Indonesia	3–2	Pelita Jaya	Malang, East Java
	Ridhuan 13'; Dzumafo 56'; N'Kong 86'		Nwokolo 9', 33'	Stadium: Kanjuruhan Stadium

2 May 2012 23	PSPS Pekanbaru	1–0	Arema Indonesia	Pekanbaru, Riau
	Azhar 61'

6 May 2012 24	Persija Jakarta	1–0	Arema Indonesia	Jakarta, Jakarta
	Javier 59'

12 May 2012 25	Arema Indonesia	1–0	Persisam Samarinda	Malang, East Java
	Ariyanto 82'			Stadium: Kanjuruhan Stadium

17 May 2012 26	Arema Indonesia	5–3	Mitra Kukar	Malang, East Java
	[[]]; [[]]; [[]]; [[]]; [[]]		[[]]; [[]]; [[]]	Stadium: Kanjuruhan Stadium

21 May 2012 27	PSAP Sigli	1–1	Arema Indonesia	Sigli, Aceh
	[[]]		[[]]

26 May 2012 28	PSMS Medan	1–1	Arema Indonesia	Medan, North Sumatra
	[[]]		[[]]

31 May 2012 29	Arema Indonesia	4–0	Persidafon Dafonsoro	Malang, East Java
	[[]]		[[]]	Stadium: Kanjuruhan Stadium

12 June 2012 30	Arema Indonesia	3–1	Deltras Sidoarjo	Malang, East Java
	[[]]		[[]]	Stadium: Kanjuruhan Stadium

16 June 2012 31	Sriwijaya FC	2–1	Arema Indonesia	Palembang, South Sumatra
	[[]]		[[]]

24 June 2012 32	Arema Indonesia	3–1	Persiba Balikpapan	Malang, East Java
	[[]]		[[]]	Stadium: Kanjuruhan Stadium

30 June 2012 33	Arema Indonesia	0–0	Gresik United	Malang, East Java
	[[]]		[[]]	Stadium: Kanjuruhan Stadium

11 July 2012 34	Persela Lamongan	3–1	Arema Indonesia	Lamongan, East Java
	[[]]		[[]]
