= 2015 PS Barito Putera season =

Barito Putera
2015 season
- Chairman: H.A. Sulaiman.H.B
- Head Coach: Salahuddin
- Stadium: 17 May
- Indonesian Super League: TBD

== Matches ==
=== Legend ===
Win Draw Loss Postponed

=== Indonesia Super League ===
Date	KO	Stadium	City	Opponent	Result^{4}	Attendance	Goalscorers		Source
Date	KO	Stadium	City	Opponent	Result^{4}	Attendance	Barito Putera	Opponent	Source
4 April 2015	15:30	A	Lamongan	Persela Lamongan	2–0	9,235	Agi 87'; Musafri 89'		
7 April 2015	21:00	A	Malang	Arema Cronus	0–1	4,151		Beltrame 69' (pen.)	
11 April 2015	19:00	H	Banjarmasin	Persegres Gresik United	0–1	10,513		Dzumafo 14'	

== Statistics ==
=== Squad ===
As of 5 April 2015.

No.	Pos	Nat	Player	Total		Indonesia Super League		Piala Indonesia	
No.	Pos	Nat	Player	Apps	Goals	Apps	Goals	Apps	Goals
5	DF	(Montenegro) MNE	Igor Radusinović	1	0	1	0	0	0
6	DF	(Indonesia) IDN	Agus Cima	0	0	0	0	0	0
7	FW	(Indonesia) IDN	Antony Nugroho	1	0	1	0	0	0
8	MF	(Indonesia) IDN	Amirul Mukminin	1	0	1	0	0	0
13	MF	(Indonesia) IDN	Lucky Wahyu	1	0	1	0	0	0
15	GK	(Indonesia) IDN	Teguh Amiruddin	0	0	0	0	0	0
16	DF	(Indonesia) IDN	Muhammad Roby	0	0	0	0	0	0
17	MF	(Indonesia) IDN	Syahroni	1	0	1	0	0	0
18	DF	(Indonesia) IDN	Guntur Ariyadi	0	0	0	0	0	0
19	DF	(Indonesia) IDN	Eddy Gunawan	0	0	0	0	0	0
20	GK	(Indonesia) IDN	Aditya Harlan	1	0	1	0	0	0
21	FW	(Indonesia) IDN	Agi Pratama	1	1	1	1	0	0
22	MF	(Indonesia) IDN	Paulo Sitanggang	1	0	1	0	0	0
23	MF	(Indonesia) IDN	Dedi Hartono	1	0	1	0	0	0
25	MF	(Indonesia) IDN	Manahati Lestusen	1	0	1	0	0	0
26	MF	(Indonesia) IDN	Rizky Pora	1	0	1	0	0	0
29	FW	(Indonesia) IDN	Talaohu Musafri	1	1	1	1	0	0
32	DF	(Indonesia) IDN	Hansamu Yama	1	0	1	0	0	0
33	GK	(Indonesia) IDN	Joko Ribowo	0	0	0	0	0	0
77	MF	(Indonesia) IDN	Tedi	0	0	0	0	0	0
78	DF	(Indonesia) IDN	Leonard Tupamahu	1	0	1	0	0	0

=== Clean sheets ===
As of 5 April 2015.

Rnk	Pos	No.	Player	Indonesia Super League	Piala Indonesia	Total
1	GK	20	(Indonesia) Aditya Harlan	1	0	1
Total				1	0	1

=== Disciplinary record ===
As of 5 April 2015.

Rnk	Pos.	No.	Player	ISL			Piala Indonesia			Total		
Rnk	Pos.	No.	Player	Booked	(yellow card) (yellow-red card)	Sent off (straight red)	Booked	(yellow card) (yellow-red card)	Sent off (straight red)	Booked	(yellow card) (yellow-red card)	Sent off (straight red)
1	GK	20	(Indonesia) Aditya Harlan	1	0	0	0	0	0	1	0	0
Total				1	0	0	0	0	0	1	0	0

== Transfers ==
=== In ===
No.	Pos.	Name	Moving from	Type	Sources
	GK	(Indonesia) Teguh Amiruddin	(Indonesia) Perseru Serui	Released	
	MF	(Indonesia) Paulo Sitanggang	Jember United	Released	
	DF	(Indonesia) Hansamu Yama	Free Agent	Released	
	DF	(Montenegro) Igor Radusinovic	Free Agent	Released	
	DF	(Indonesia) Eddy Gunawan	(Indonesia) Persela Lamongan	Released	
	DF	(Indonesia) Leonard Tupamahu	(Indonesia) Persiram Raja Ampat	Released	
	DF	(Indonesia) Muhammad Roby	(Indonesia) Persisam Putra Samarinda	Released	
	MF	(Indonesia) Manahati Lestusen	(Indonesia) Bhayangkara F.C.	Released	
	FW	(Serbia) Marjan Jugović	(Bosnia and Herzegovina) NK Zvijezda Gradačac	Released	
	FW	(Indonesia) Talaohu Musafri	(Indonesia) Pelita Bandung Raya	Released	
	FW	(Indonesia) Agi Pratama	(Indonesia) Perseban Banjar	Released	

=== Out ===
No.	Pos.	Name	Moving to	Type	Sources
	DF	(Cameroon) Abanda Herman		Released	
	MF, FW	(Liberia) James Lomell	(Indonesia) Persiram Raja Ampat	Released	
	DF	(South Korea) Ha Dae-Won	(Indonesia) Bali United	Released	
