= 2015 Mitra Kukar F.C. season =

Mitra Kukar
2015 season
- Chairman: Endri Erawan
- Head Coach: vacant
- Stadium: Aji Imbut Stadium
- Indonesian Super League: TBD

== Review and events ==
=== Pre–2015 ===
On 11 December 2014, Mitra Kukar announced that Scott Cooper had been appointed as the new manager for the 2015 season. Cooper will start to actively handle Mitra Kukar on January 1, 2015. Cooper will be contracted for two seasons with Mitra Kukar

== Matches ==
=== Legend ===
Win Draw Loss Postponed

=== Indonesia Super League ===
MD	Date	KO	Stadium	City	Opponent	Result^{1}	Attendance	Goalscorers		Source
MD	Date	KO	Stadium	City	Opponent	Result^{1}	Attendance	Mitra Kukar	Opponent	Source
1	5 April 2015	19:00	A	Surabaya	Bhayangkara F.C.	–				
2	8 April 2015	15:30	A	Gresik	Persegres Gresik United FC	–				
3	12 April 2015	19:00	H	Tenggarong	Arema Cronus	–				
4	15 April 2015	15:30	H	Tenggarong	Persela Lamongan	–				
5	19 April 2015	21:00	A	Sleman	Persiram Raja Ampat	–				
6	23 April 2015	19:00	A	Gianyar	Bali United Pusam F.C.	–				
7	6 May 2015	15:30	H	Tenggarong	Persipura Jayapura	–				
8	10 May 2015	19:00	H	Tenggarong	Perseru Serui	–				
9	21 June 2015	21:00	A	Jakarta	Persija Jakarta	–				
10	25 June 2015	21:00	A	Banjarmasin	Barito Putera	–				
11	30 June 2015	21:00	H	Tenggarong	Pusamania Borneo FC	–				
12	7 July 2015	21:00	H	Tenggarong	Semen Padang FC	–				
13	10 July 2015	21:00	H	Tenggarong	Pelita Bandung Raya	–				
14	26 July 2015	15:30	A	Makassar	PSM Makassar	–				
15	31 July 2015	15:30	A	Balikpapan	Persiba Balikpapan	–				
16	3 August 2015	15:30	H	Tenggarong	Sriwijaya FC	–				
17	7 August 2015	15:30	H	Tenggarong	Persib Bandung	–				
18	18 August 2015	15:30	A	Soreang	Persib Bandung	–				
19	22 August 2015	15:30	A	Palembang	Sriwijaya FC	–				
20	26 August 2015	15:30	H	Tenggarong	Persiba Balikpapan	–				
21	29 August 2015	19:00	H	Tenggarong	PSM Makassar	–				
22	10 September 2015	15:30	A	Soreang	Pelita Bandung Raya	–				
23	14 September 2015	21:00	A	Padang	Semen Padang	–				
24	19 September 2015	19:00	A	Samarinda	Pusamania Borneo	–				
25	29 September 2015	15:30	H	Tenggarong	Barito Putera	–				
26	3 October 2015	15:30	H	Tenggarong	Persija Jakarta	–				
27	14 October 2015	13:30	A	Jayapura	Persipura Jayapura	–				
28	17 October 2015	13:30	A	Serui	Perseru Serui	–				
29	23 October 2015	15:30	H	Tenggarong	Bali United Pusam F.C.	–				
30	27 October 2015	15:30	H	Tenggarong	Persiram Raja Ampat	–				
31	2 November 2015	15:30	A	Lamongan	Persela Lamongan	–				
32	5 November 2015	15:30	A	Malang	Arema Cronus	–				
33	19 November 2015		H	Tenggarong	Persegres Gresik United FC	–				
34	23 November 2015		H	Tenggarong	Bhayangkara F.C.	–				

=== Piala Indonesia ===
RD	Date	Kickoff	Venue	City	Opponent	Result^{1}	Attendance	Goalscorers		Ref.
RD	Date	Kickoff	Venue	City	Opponent	Result^{1}	Attendance	Persib Bandung	Opponent	Ref.
R56										

== Statistics ==
=== Squad ===
As of December 2014.

No.	Pos	Nat	Player	Total		Indonesia Super League	
No.	Pos	Nat	Player	Apps	Goals	Apps	Goals
1	GK	(Indonesia) IDN	Ravi Murdianto	0	0	0	0
2	MF	(Indonesia) IDN	Irfan Raditya	0	0	0	0
3	DF	(Indonesia) IDN	Zulkifli Syukur	0	0	0	0
5	MF	(Indonesia) IDN	Hendra Ridwan	0	0	0	0
7	FW	(Indonesia) IDN	Rachmat Afandi	0	0	0	0
8	MF	(Indonesia) IDN	Gavin Kwan Adsit	0	0	0	0
10	FW	(Indonesia) IDN	Jajang Mulyana	0	0	0	0
11	MF	(Indonesia) IDN	Ade Suhendra	0	0	0	0
13	DF	(Indonesia) IDN	Rudolf Yanto Basna	0	0	0	0
15	FW	(Indonesia) IDN	Dibyo Previan Caesario	0	0	0	0
16	MF	(Indonesia) IDN	Misriadi Didiet	0	0	0	0
18	MF	(Indonesia) IDN	Anindito Wahyu	0	0	0	0
21	GK	(Indonesia) IDN	Joyce Sorongan	0	0	0	0
22	MF	(Indonesia) IDN	Tigam Alif Farisma	0	0	0	0
23	DF	(Indonesia) IDN	Ryuji Utomo Prabowo	0	0	0	0
24	DF	(Indonesia) IDN	Diego Michiels	0	0	0	0
25	DF	(Spain) ESP	Jorge Gotor Blas	0	0	0	0
26	MF	(Indonesia) IDN	M. Bachtiar	0	0	0	0
27	DF	(Indonesia) IDN	Dedi Gusmawan	0	0	0	0
29	FW	(Indonesia) IDN	Septian David Maulana	0	0	0	0
33	DF	(Indonesia) IDN	Syahrizal Syahbuddin	0	0	0	0
35	GK	(Indonesia) IDN	Riki Pambudi	0	0	0	0
59	GK	(Indonesia) IDN	Wawan Hendrawan	0	0	0	0
99	FW	(Indonesia) IDN	Yogi Rahadian	0	0	0	0
	DF	(Indonesia) IDN	Samsudin	0	0	0	0
	MF	(Indonesia) IDN	Mahdi Fahri Albaar	0	0	0	0
	MF	(Indonesia) IDN	Dinan Yahdian Javier	0	0	0	0
	MF	(Spain) ESP	Cristian Portilla	0	0	0	0
	MF	(Indonesia) IDN	Rizky Pellu	0	0	0	0
	FW	(Republic of Ireland) IRL	Roy O'Donovan	0	0	0	0

== Transfers ==
=== In ===
No.	Pos.	Name	Moving from	Type	Sources
	GK	(Indonesia) Ravi murdianto	Free agent	Released	
	FW	(Indonesia) Septian David Maulana	Free agent	Released	
	DF	(Indonesia) Mahdi Fahri Albaar	Free agent	Released	
	GK	(Indonesia) Wawan Hendrawan	(Indonesia) Persiba Balikpapan	Released	
	MF	(Indonesia) Gavin Kwan Adsit	Free agent	Released	
	DF	(Indonesia) Ryuji Utomo Prabowo	Free agent	Released	
	DF	(Indonesia) Syahrizal Syahbuddin	(Indonesia) Persija Jakarta	Released	
	FW	(Indonesia) Rachmat Afandi	(Indonesia) Persija Jakarta	Released	
	DF	(Indonesia) Rudolf Yanto Basna	(Indonesia) Sriwijaya FC U21	Released	
	DF	(Spain) Jorge Gotor	(Iraq) Erbil SC	Released	
	FW	(Indonesia) Dibyo Previan Caesario	(Indonesia)	Released	
	MF	(Indonesia) Dinan Yahdian Javier	Free agent	Released	
	MF	(Spain) Cristian Portilla	(Hungary) Budapest Honvéd FC	Released	
	MF	(Indonesia) Rizky Pellu	(Indonesia) Pelita Bandung Raya	Released	
	FW	(Republic of Ireland) Roy O'Donovan	Brunei DPMM FC	Released	

=== Out ===
No.	Pos.	Name	Moving to	Type	Sources
	DF	(Brazil) Reinaldo Lobo	(Malaysia) Penang FA	Released	
	GK	(Indonesia) Dian Agus Prasetyo	(Indonesia) Sriwijaya FC	Released	
	FW	(Cameroon) Herman Dzumafo Epandi	(Indonesia) Semen Padang F.C.	Released	
	MF	(Indonesia) Bima Sakti	(Indonesia) Gresik United	Released	
	DF	(South Korea) Park Chul-Hyung	(Malaysia) UiTM F.C.	Released	
	MF, FW	(Indonesia) Zulham Zamrun	(Indonesia) Persipura Jayapura	Released	
	MF	(Indonesia) Raphael Maitimo	(Indonesia) Sriwijaya FC	Released	
	MF	(Indonesia) Zulvin Zamrun	(Indonesia) Pusamania Borneo	Released	
	DF	(Indonesia) Gunawan Dwi Cahyo	(Indonesia) Persija Jakarta	Released	
	MF	(Liberia) Erick Weeks Lewis	(Indonesia) Pusamania Borneo	Released	
