= Dedi =

Dedi may refer to:

== People ==
=== Mononym ===
- Dedi I, Margrave of the Saxon Ostmark (d. 1075)
- Dedi II, Margrave of Lusatia (d. 1169)
- Dedi III, Margrave of Lusatia (d. 1190)

=== Given name ===
- Dedi Baron (born 1954), Israeli theatre and opera director
- Dedi Ben Dayan (b. 1978), Israeli footballer
- Dedi Graucher, Israeli musician
- Dedi Gusmawan (b. 1985), Indonesian footballer
- Dedi Hartono (b. 1987), Indonesian footballer
- Dedi Heryanto (b. 1988), Indonesian footballer
- Dedi Iman (b. 1985), Indonesian footballer
- Dedi Indra Sampurna (b. 1986), Indonesian footballer
- Dedi Kusnandar (b. 1991), Indonesian footballer
- Dedi Mulyadi (b. 1971), Indonesian politician
- Dedi Priadi (born 1959), Indonesian university administrator
- Dedi Yuliardi Ashadi (1963 – 2020), Indonesian singer and presenter
- Dedi Zucker (born 1948), Israeli activist and former politician

=== Surname ===
- Murr Dedi, mythical Albanian figure
- Veli Dedi (1912–1995), Albanian general

== Places ==
- Dedinje, Kosovo, village, called Dedi in Albanian

== Other uses ==
- Djedi, fictional ancient Egyptian magician appearing in the fourth chapter of a story told in the Westcar Papyrus
- Dedicated server

== See also ==
- DEDI, online encyclopedia of the natural and cultural heritage of Slovenia
- W. B. Yeats (1865–1939), Irish poet nicknamed Daemon est Deus inversus (abbreviated D.E.D.I.)
