= 2018 LFA Primeira =

Primeira Divisaun
- Season: 2018
- Dates: 3 March – 29 July 2018
- Champions: Boavista (1st title)
- Relegated: Cacusan; DIT
- AFC Cup: Boavista
- Matches: 56
- Goals: 214 (3.82 per match)
- Top goalscorer: Fábio Christian (17 goals)
- Biggest home win: Karketu 10–0 Cacusan (30 June 2018)
- Biggest away win: Cacusan 0–12 Atlético (8 June 2018)
- Highest scoring: Cacusan 0–12 Atlético (8 June 2018)
- Longest winning run: 6 games, Boavista
- Longest unbeaten run: 6 games, Boavista; Atlético
- Longest winless run: 14 games, Cacusan
- Longest losing run: 11 games, Cacusan
- All statistics correct as of 29 July 2018.

The 2018 LFA Primeira is the third season of the Liga Futebol Amadora Primeira Divisão. The season began on March 3 and originally finished on August 5, but rescheduled to be finished on July 29.

Karketu Dili is the current defending champions.

Boavista won their first LFA Primeira title, with one match to spare following a 10–1 away win over Cacusan on 22 July 2018, while its competitor Karketu only drew 1–1 against Ponta Leste on 20 July 2018.

Cacusan to be the first team who relegated to 2019 LFA Segunda, with four match to spare following a 0–10 loss against Karketu on 30 June 2018. DIT was the second team got relegated to 2019 LFA Segunda, with two match to spare following a 2–4 loss against Ponta Leste on 13 July 2018.

== Teams ==
There are 8 teams that will play this season.

=== from Primeira ===
FC Zebra and FC Porto Taibesse were relegated to 2018 Segunda Divisao after finished 7th and bottom place of 2017 Primeira Divisao.

=== to Primeira ===
Atlético Ultramar and DIT F.C. promoted to 2018 Primeira Divisao after securing place as champions and runners-up in 2017 Segunda Divisao. DIT F.C. returned to top flight after last season relegated to Segunda Divisao and Atlético Ultramar was newly promotion clubs.

=== Name changes ===
- Carsae FC was renamed to Boavista Futebol Clube Timor Leste in January 2018.

=== Locations ===
Locations of the 2018 LFA Primera teams

=== Personnel and kits ===
| Club | City / Area | Coach | Captain | Kit manufacturer | Shirt sponsor | Other sponsor | Owner |
|---|---|---|---|---|---|---|---|
| Académica | Dili | (Timor-Leste) Asala | | Umbro | | | (Timor-Leste) UNTL |
| Atlético Ultramar | Manatuto | (Malaysia) Andi Sutanto | (Brazil) Glauco Trajano | BLK | | | (Timor-Leste) Eugenio Gusmão |
| Boavista | Dili | (Chile) Eladio Rojas | (Timor-Leste) Henrique Cruz | BLK | npm | MoneyGram | (Timor-Leste) José Ramos-Horta |
| Cacusan | Becora, Dili | (Timor-Leste) Fernando Xavier | (Timor-Leste) Juvinal Boavida | | Cristo Rei | | |
| D.I.T. | Dili | (Timor-Leste) Manuel Pinto | (Timor-Leste) José Santos | BLK | | | (Timor-Leste) Dili Institute of Technology |
| Karketu Dili | Dili | (Moldova) Arcan Iurie | (Timor-Leste) Boavida Olegario | Umbro | | Obrai Unip Lda. Tanjung Motor; Emanuel Residence; East Gas Corp. Britas Lda. LCF Creative | |
| Ponta Leste | Dili | (Timor-Leste) Eduardo Pereira | | Umbro | | | |
| Benfica | Laulara, Aileu | (South Korea) Kim Shin-hwan | (Timor-Leste) Nidio Alves | BLK | TL-cement | | (Timor-Leste) Xanana Gusmão |

=== Managerial changes ===
| Club(s) | Outgoing manager | Manner of departure | Date of vacancy | Position in table | Incoming Manager | Date of appointment |
|---|---|---|---|---|---|---|
| Boavista | (Indonesia) Rochy Putiray | End of contract | 22 September 2017 | Pre-season | (Chile) Eladio Rojas | 29 December 2017 |
| Karketu Dili | (Chile) Simón Elissetche | Signed by (Indonesia) Aceh United | 28 December 2017 | Pre-season | (Moldova) Arcan Iurie | 29 January 2018 |

=== Stadiums ===
- Primary venues used in the 2018 LFA Primera:

| Dili | (Bobonaro District) Maliana |
| Kampo Demokrasia | Malibaca Yamato Stadium |
| Capacity: 1,000 | Capacity: 5,000 |

== Foreign players ==
Restricting the number of foreign players strictly to four per team. A team could use four foreign players on the field each game. Name on BOLD was foreign players who registered in mid-season transfer window.

As of 14 February 2018

| Club | Player 1 | Player 2 | Player 3 | Player 4 | Former player(s) |
|---|---|---|---|---|---|
| Académica | (Indonesia) Antunius Tan | (Indonesia) Mario Aibekob | | | |
| Atlético Ultramar | (Brazil) Bernardo Freire | (Brazil) Fábio Christian | (Brazil) Gabriel | (Brazil) Glauco | |
| Boavista | (Brazil) Gustavo | (Brazil) Rodolfo | (Chile) Antonio Vega | (Portugal) Joao Paulo Pereira | |
| Cacusan | **(Ghana) Kovakou Roni** | (Indonesia) Dani Ardianto | (Indonesia) Rivaldi | (Indonesia) Zulkarnain | |
| DIT F.C. | **(Ghana) Yeaode Donald** | (Indonesia) Charles Roby Yan | **(Indonesia) Gilbert Dwaramury** | (Indonesia) Nur Ichsan | (Indonesia) Iner Sontany Putra |
| Karketu Dili | (Ghana) **Daniel Adadi** | (Ghana) **David Annan** | (Indonesia) **Agus Halitopo** | (Indonesia) **Irvan Mofu** | |
| Ponta Leste | (Argentina) Mario Costas | (Brazil) Antonio Teles | (Ghana) Adu Akwasi | (Ghana) Daniel Kwane Donkor | |
| Sport Laulara e Benfica | (Ghana) **Bakayoko Ozo** | | | | |

Notes

1. FORMER PLAYER: Foreign players who were out of LFA Primera squad/left club within the season, after pre-season transfer window, or in the mid-season transfer window.
2. BOLD: Foreign players who registered in mid-season transfer window.

== League table ==
| Pos | Team | Pld | W | D | L | GF | GA | GD | Pts | Qualification or relegation |
|---|---|---|---|---|---|---|---|---|---|---|
| 1 | Boavista (C) | 14 | 10 | 2 | 2 | 33 | 8 | +25 | 32 | |
| 2 | Karketu Dili | 14 | 7 | 4 | 3 | 32 | 16 | +16 | 25 | |
| 3 | Atlético Ultramar | 14 | 6 | 4 | 4 | 40 | 16 | +24 | 22 | |
| 4 | Ponta Leste | 14 | 6 | 4 | 4 | 29 | 17 | +12 | 22 | |
| 5 | Benfica Laulara | 14 | 5 | 7 | 2 | 24 | 16 | +8 | 22 | |
| 6 | Académica | 14 | 6 | 1 | 7 | 26 | 34 | −8 | 19 | |
| 7 | DIT (R) | 14 | 3 | 3 | 8 | 21 | 29 | −8 | 12 | Relegation to the 2019 LFA Segunda |
| 8 | Cacusan (R) | 14 | 0 | 1 | 13 | 9 | 78 | −69 | 1 | Relegation to the 2019 LFA Segunda |

Updated to match(es) played on 29 July 2018. Source: Liga Futebol Amadora FIFA
Rules for classification: 1) points; 2) goal difference; 3) number of goals scored.
(C) Champions; (R) Relegated

== Result table ==
| Home \ Away | ACA | ATU | BTL | CCF | DIT | KAR | POL | SLB |
|---|---|---|---|---|---|---|---|---|
| AS Académica | | 2–1 | 0–4 | 3–2 | 1–5 | 1–2 | 1–5 | 1–1 |
| Atlético Ultramar | 2–3 | | 0–0 | 8–0 | 3–1 | 3–0 | 3–2 | 2–3 |
| Boavista Futebol Clube Timor Leste | 3–1 | 2–0 | | 6–1 | 1–0 | 0–3 | 1–0 | 3–0 |
| Cacusan CF | 1–5 | 0–12 | 1–10 | | 1–3 | 0–5 | 1–3 | 0–5 |
| DIT F.C. | 3–2 | 0–3 | 0–0 | 1–1 | | 3–4 | 2–4 | 1–1 |
| Karketu Dili | 1–2 | 1–1 | 1–0 | 10–0 | 1–0 | | 0–2 | 2–2 |
| AS Ponta Leste | 1–2 | 1–1 | 1–2 | 3–1 | 5–1 | 1–1 | | 0–0 |
| Sport Laulara e Benfica | 3–2 | 1–1 | 0–1 | 4–0 | 2–1 | 1–1 | 1–1 | |

Updated to match(es) played on 29 July 2018. Source: Liga Futebol Amadora
Legend: Blue = home team win; Yellow = draw; Red = away team win.

== Fixtures and results ==
Due to Timor-Leste national under-21 team schedule in April 2018 for their participation in the 2018 Hassanal Bolkiah Trophy, Round 4 and Round 7 was rescheduled from originally on April 21–22 and May 26–27 in Malibaca Yamato Stadium, Maliana and Baucau Municipal Stadium, Baucau move to April 5–8 and June 7–10 in Kampo Demokrasia, Dili, while Round 6 rescheduled from May 17–20 in Kampo Demokrasia, Dili move to May 26–27 in Malibaca Yamato Stadium, Maliana and Baucau Municipal Stadium, Baucau, also Round 5 rescheduled from April 26–29 move to May 17–20 in same place. Rescheduled for Round 8 to Round 14 not yet announced.

On 19 May 2018 Round 6 was rescheduled one more time from originally May 26–27 in Malibaca Yamato Stadium, Maliana and Baucau Municipal Stadium, Baucau move to May 25–28 in Kampo Demokrasia, Dili. Schedules for Round 8 to Round 14 was also announced at the same time.

=== Round 1 ===
| 3 March 2018 | Karketu Dili | 1–0 | DIT | Maliana, Bobonaro |
| 16:00 (UTC+9) | Frangcyatma Kefi 20' | Report | | Stadium: Malibaca Yamato Stadium; Referee: Pedro Carvalho |

| 9 March 2018 | Atlético Ultramar | 2–3 | Académica | Dili |
| 16:00 (UTC+9) | Fábio Christian 21'; Bernardo Freire 40' | Report | Mario Aibekob 30'; Anggisu 47'; Julião Ximenes 66' | Stadium: Kampo Demokrasia; Referee: Pedro Carvalho |

| 10 March 2018 | Cacusan | 1–3 | Ponta Leste | Dili |
| 16:00 (UTC+9) | Juvinal Cardoso 78' | Report | Jorge Alves 20', 68'; Daniel Donkor 36' | Stadium: Kampo Demokrasia; Referee: Joanico Nycolas Gama |

| 11 March 2018 | Boavista | 3–0 | Benfica | Dili |
| 16:00 (UTC+9) | Rudolfo Augusto 30'; Edit Savio 40', 77' | Report | | Stadium: Kampo Demokrasia |

=== Round 2 ===
| 22 March 2018 | Benfica | 2–1 | DIT | Dili |
| 16:00 (UTC+9) | Nidio Alves 49'; João Freitas 71' | Report | Ricardo Mendonca 6' | Stadium: Kampo Demokrasia |

| 23 March 2018 | Ponta Leste | 1–1 | Atlético Ultramar | Dili |
| 16:00 (UTC+9) | Daniel Donkor 15' | Report | Eusebio Pereira 6' | Stadium: Kampo Demokrasia |

| 24 March 2018 | Karketu Dili | 1–0 | Boavista | Dili |
| 16:00 (UTC+9) | Frangcyatma Kefi 88' | Report | | Stadium: Kampo Demokrasia |

| 25 March 2018 | Académica | 3–2 | Cacusan | Dili |
| 16:00 (UTC+9) | Mario Aibekob 42'; Armindo Barbosa 45'; Gaspar da Silva 81' | Report | Jose Carvalho 28'; Juvinal Boavida 49' | Stadium: Kampo Demokrasia |

=== Round 3 ===
| 12 April 2018 | Atlético Ultramar | 3–1 | DIT | Dili |
| 16:00 (UTC+9) | Fábio Christian 7', 13'; Celso Esqurial 69' | Report | José Santos 39' | Stadium: Kampo Demokrasia |

| 13 April 2018 | Cacusan | 0–5 | Karketu Dili | Dili |
| 16:00 (UTC+9) | | Report | Anito Cesario 32' (o.g.); Ruben Borges 45'; Frangcyatma Kefi 45'; Rufino Gama 65', 77' | Stadium: Kampo Demokrasia |

| 14 April 2018 | Académica | 0–4 | Boavista | Dili |
| 16:00 (UTC+9) | | Report | Rudolfo Augusto 39', 63'; Edit Savio 60', 85' | Stadium: Kampo Demokrasia |

| 15 April 2018 | Ponta Leste | 0–0 | Benfica | Dili |
| 16:00 (UTC+9) | | Report | | Stadium: Kampo Demokrasia |

=== Round 4 ===
| 5 April 2018 | Boavista | 1–0 | Ponta Leste | Dili |
| 16:00 (UTC+9) | Danilson Araujo 39' | Report | | Stadium: Kampo Demokrasia |

| 6 April 2018 | Académica | 1–1 | Benfica | Dili |
| 16:00 (UTC+9) | Armindo Barbosa 45+1' (pen.) | Report | Nidio Alves 59' | Stadium: Kampo Demokrasia |

| 7 April 2018 | Karketu Dili | 1–1 | Atlético Ultramar | Dili |
| 16:00 (UTC+9) | Rufino Gama 60' | Report | Bernardo Freire 90+3' | Stadium: Kampo Demokrasia; Referee: Nivio Da Costa Fernandes |

| 8 April 2018 | DIT | 1–1 | Cacusan | Dili |
| 16:00 (UTC+9) | Orcelio da Silva 46' | Report | Mariano Pinto 33' | Stadium: Kampo Demokrasia; Referee: Pedro Carvalho |

=== Round 5 ===
| 17 May 2018 | Boavista | 2–0 | Atlético Ultramar | Dili |
| 16:00 (UTC+9) | Edit Savio 3'; Joao Paulo 25' | Report | | Stadium: Kampo Demokrasia |

| 18 May 2018 | Ponta Leste | 5–1 | DIT | Dili |
| 16:00 (UTC+9) | Mario Costas 15'; Quito 36'; Daniel Donkor 66', 68'; Silveiro Garcia 90+1' | Report | Joanico Braganca 77' | Stadium: Kampo Demokrasia |

| 19 May 2018 | Académica | 1–2 | Karketu Dili | Dili |
| 16:00 (UTC+9) | Mario Aibekob 73' | Report | Jose Fonseca 55'; Frangcyatma Kefi 72' | Stadium: Kampo Demokrasia |

| 20 May 2018 | Benfica | 4–0 | Cacusan | Dili |
| 16:00 (UTC+9) | Mouzinho de Lima 1', 64'; Yohanes Gusmao 62'; Filomeno da Costa 71' | Report | | Stadium: Kampo Demokrasia; Referee: Joanico Nycolas Gama |

=== Round 6 ===
| 25 May 2018 | Karketu Dili | 0–2 | Ponta Leste | Dili |
| 16:00 (UTC+9) | | Report | Daniel Donkor 33'; Mario Costas 85' | Stadium: Kampo Demokrasia |

| 26 May 2018 | DIT | 3–2 | Académica | Dili |
| 16:00 (UTC+9) | Celso Garcia 46'; Yeaode Donald 61'; José Santos 71' | Report | Neveo Neto 85'; Antunius Tan 90+3' | Stadium: Kampo Demokrasia |

| 27 May 2018 | Boavista | 6–1 | Cacusan | Dili |
| 16:00 (UTC+9) | Antonio Vega 5' (pen.), 60'; Henrique Cruz 32', 40', 85'; José Oliveira 57' | Report | Juvinal Boavida 14' | Stadium: Kampo Demokrasia |

| 28 May 2018 | Atlético Ultramar | 2–3 | Benfica | Dili |
| 16:00 (UTC+9) | Bernardo Freire 41'; Gabriel Brito 45' | Report | Joao Almeida 10', 45+2'; Yohanes Gusmao 14' | Stadium: Kampo Demokrasia |

=== Round 7 ===
| 7 June 2018 | Ponta Leste | 1–2 | Académica | Dili |
| 16:00 (UTC+9) | Daniel Donkor 37' | Report | Salvador da Silva 8'; Mario Aibekob 18' | Stadium: Kampo Demokrasia |

| 8 June 2018 | Cacusan | 0–12 | Atlético Ultramar | Dili |
| 16:00 (UTC+9) | | Report | Fábio Christian 10', 21', 36', 78', 90+1', 90+2'; Bernardo Freire 22', 37', 40', 82'; Celso Esqurial 29'; Glauco Trajano 74' | Stadium: Kampo Demokrasia |

| 9 June 2018 | Boavista | 1–0 | DIT | Dili |
| 16:00 (UTC+9) | Frangcyatma Kefi 32' | Report | | Stadium: Kampo Demokrasia |

| 10 June 2018 | Karketu Dili | 2–2 | Benfica | Dili |
| 16:00 (UTC+9) | Rufino Gama 64'; Marcelino Fernandes 83' | Report | Mouzinho de Lima 4'; Filomeno da Costa 43' | Stadium: Kampo Demokrasia |

=== Round 8 ===
| 15 June 2018 | Benfica | 0–1 | Boavista | Dili |
| 16:00 (UTC+9) | | Report | Edit Savio 1' | Stadium: Kampo Demokrasia |

| 16 June 2018 | Ponta Leste | 3–1 | Cacusan | Dili |
| 16:00 (UTC+9) | Lourenco Ximenes 32'; Silveiro Garcia 37'; Daniel Donkor 79' | Report | Adino Tilman 32' | Stadium: Kampo Demokrasia |

| 17 June 2018 | Académica | 2–1 | Atlético Ultramar | Dili |
| 16:00 (UTC+9) | Antunius Tan 88'; Julião Ximenes 89' | Report | Fábio Christian 44' (pen.) | Stadium: Kampo Demokrasia |

| 18 June 2018 | DIT | 3–4 | Karketu Dili | Dili |
| 16:00 (UTC+9) | José Santos 14', 19', 43' | Report | Dino Amaral 5' (o.g.); Boavida Olegario 31'; Rufino Gama 57'; Gelvanio Alberto 72' | Stadium: Kampo Demokrasia |

=== Round 9 ===
| 21 June 2018 | DIT | 1–1 | Benfica | Dili |
| 16:00 (UTC+9) | José Santos 43' | Report | Rivaldo Correia 34' | Stadium: Kampo Demokrasia |

| 22 June 2018 | Atlético Ultramar | 3–2 | Ponta Leste | Dili |
| 16:00 (UTC+9) | Bernardo Freire 16'; Gabriel Brito 78'; Fábio Christian 81' | Report | Ricardo Maia 32'; Lourenco Ximenes 85' | Stadium: Kampo Demokrasia |

| 23 June 2018 | Boavista | 0–3 | Karketu Dili | Dili |
| 16:00 (UTC+9) | | Report | Daniel Adadi 7', 46'; Gelvanio Alberto 56' | Stadium: Kampo Demokrasia |

| 24 June 2018 | Cacusan | 1–5 | Académica | Dili |
| 16:00 (UTC+9) | Kovakou Roni 32' | Report | Antunius Tan 12', 34'; Salvador da Silva 25', 56'; Bendito Ramos 90' | Stadium: Kampo Demokrasia |

=== Round 10 ===
| 29 June 2018 | DIT | 0–3 | Atlético Ultramar | Dili |
| 16:00 (UTC+9) | | Report | Eusebio de Almeida 14'; Bernardo Freire 69'; Gabriel Brito 86' | Stadium: Kampo Demokrasia |

| 30 June 2018 | Karketu Dili | 10–0 | Cacusan | Dili |
| 16:00 (UTC+9) | Daniel Adadi 5', 27', 30', 32', 56', 67', 76'; Rufino Gama 38', 89'; Osvaldo Belo 87' | Report | | Stadium: Kampo Demokrasia |

| 1 July 2018 | Boavista | 3–1 | Académica | Dili |
| 16:00 (UTC+9) | Henrique Cruz 3', 14'; Danilson Araujo 79' | Report | Anggisu Barbosa 19' | Stadium: Kampo Demokrasia |

| 2 July 2018 | Benfica | 1–1 | Ponta Leste | Dili |
| 16:00 (UTC+9) | João Freitas 20' | Report | Mario Costas 81' | Stadium: Kampo Demokrasia |

=== Round 11 ===
| 5 July 2018 | Ponta Leste | 1–2 | Boavista | Dili |
| 16:00 (UTC+9) | Daniel Donkor 17' | Report | Henrique Cruz 2'; Danilson Araujo 26' | Stadium: Kampo Demokrasia |

| 6 July 2018 | Atlético Ultramar | 3–0 | Karketu Dili | Dili |
| 16:00 (UTC+9) | Fábio Christian 19' (pen.), 90'; João Bosco 67' | Report | | Stadium: Kampo Demokrasia |

| 7 July 2018 | Benfica | 3–2 | Académica | Dili |
| 16:00 (UTC+9) | Nidio Alves 25', 63'; João Freitas 86' | Report | Mario Aibekob 31'; Anggisu Barbosa 58' | Stadium: Kampo Demokrasia |

| 8 July 2018 | Cacusan | 1–3 | DIT | Dili |
| 16:00 (UTC+9) | Juvinal Cardoso 72' | Report | Yeaode Donald 50', 84'; José Santos 64' | Stadium: Kampo Demokrasia |

=== Round 12 ===
| 12 July 2018 | Atlético Ultramar | 0–0 | Boavista | Dili |
| 16:00 (UTC+9) | | Report | | Stadium: Kampo Demokrasia |

| 13 July 2018 | DIT | 2–4 | Ponta Leste | Dili |
| 16:00 (UTC+9) | Gilbert Dwaramury 49', 70' | Report | Silveiro Garcia 8'; Daniel Donkor 23'; Adelino Trindade 26'; Mario Costas 43' | Stadium: Kampo Demokrasia |

| 14 July 2018 | Karketu Dili | 1–2 | Académica | Dili |
| 16:00 (UTC+9) | Boavida Olegario 29' | Report | Mario Aibekob 11'; Armindo Barbosa 60' (pen.) | Stadium: Kampo Demokrasia |

| 15 July 2018 | Cacusan | 0–5 | Benfica | Dili |
| 16:00 (UTC+9) | | Report | Rivaldo Correia 39'; Yohanes Gusmao 52', 69'; João Freitas 54'; Efrem Mariano 66' | Stadium: Kampo Demokrasia |

=== Round 13 ===
| 20 July 2018 | Ponta Leste | 1–1 | Karketu Dili | Dili |
| 16:00 (UTC+9) | Daniel Donkor 45+1' | Report | Rufino Gama 13' | Stadium: Kampo Demokrasia |

| 21 July 2018 | Académica | 1–5 | DIT | Dili |
| 16:00 (UTC+9) | Anggisu Barbosa 25' | Report | José Santos 4'; Gilbert Dwaramury 7' (pen.); Dino Amaral 20'; Celso Garcia 41'; Yeaode Donald 90+3' | Stadium: Kampo Demokrasia |

| 22 July 2018 | Cacusan | 1–10 | Boavista | Dili |
| 16:00 (UTC+9) | Adino Tilman | Report | Henrique Cruz 2' (pen.), 19', 52', 80'; Frangcyatma Kefi 36', 40'; Danilson Araujo 46'; Joao Paulo 65'; Edit Savio 73', 76' | Stadium: Kampo Demokrasia |

| 23 July 2018 | Benfica | 1–1 | Atlético Ultramar | Dili |
| 16:00 (UTC+9) | João Freitas 65' | Report | Bernardo Freire 79' | Stadium: Kampo Demokrasia |

=== Round 14 ===
| 26 July 2018 | Académica | 1–5 | Ponta Leste | Dili |
| 16:00 (UTC+9) | Armindo Barbosa 72' (pen.) | Report | Jorge Alves 17', 47'; Expedito Conceicão 26'; Candido de Oliveira 41'; Mario Costas 90+1' | Stadium: Kampo Demokrasia |

| 27 July 2018 | Atlético Ultramar | 8–0 | Cacusan | Dili |
| 16:00 (UTC+9) | Fábio Christian 12', 28', 53', 64'; Bernardo Freire 17', 33'; Celso Esqurial 73', 88' | Report | | Stadium: Kampo Demokrasia |

| 28 July 2018 | DIT | 0–0 | Boavista | Dili |
| 16:00 (UTC+9) | | Report | | Stadium: Kampo Demokrasia |

| 29 July 2018 | Benfica | 1–1 | Karketu Dili | Dili |
| 16:00 (UTC+9) | Bakayoko Ozo 79' | Report | Filipe Oliveira 52' | Stadium: Kampo Demokrasia |

== Season statistics ==
=== Top scorers ===
As of Match played on 29 July 2018.

| Rank | Player | Club | Goals |
|---|---|---|---|
| 1 | (Brazil) Fábio Christian | Atlético Ultramar | 17 |
| 2 | (Brazil) Bernardo Freire | Atlético Ultramar | 12 |
| 3 | (Timor-Leste) Henrique Cruz | Boavista | 10 |
| 3 | (Ghana) Daniel Donkor | Ponta Leste | 10 |
| 5 | (Ghana) Daniel Adadi | Karketu Dili | 9 |
| 6 | (Timor-Leste) Edit Savio | Boavista | 8 |
| 6 | (Timor-Leste) José Santos | DIT | 8 |
| 6 | (Timor-Leste) Rufino Gama | Karketu Dili | 8 |
| 9 | (Timor-Leste) Frangcyatma Kefi | Boavista (Note: He was scoring 4 goals for Karketu Dili in the first half of season before joining Boavista.) | 7 |
| 10 | (Indonesia) Mario Aibekob | Académica | 6 |
| 11 | 2 players | | 5 |
| 13 | 6 players | | 4 |
| 19 | 7 players | | 3 |
| 26 | 14 players | | 2 |
| 40 | 24 players | | 1 |

=== Hat-tricks ===
As of matches played on 29 July 2018.

| Player | For | Against | Result | Date |
|---|---|---|---|---|
| (Timor-Leste) Henrique Cruz | Boavista | Cacusan | 6–1 (H) | 27 May 2018 |
| (Brazil) Fábio Christian^{6} | Atlético Ultramar | Cacusan | 12–0 (A) | 8 June 2018 |
| (Brazil) Bernardo Freire^{4} | Atlético Ultramar | Cacusan | 12–0 (A) | 8 June 2018 |
| (Timor-Leste) José Santos | DIT | Karketu Dili | 3–4 (H) | 18 June 2018 |
| (Ghana) Daniel Adadi^{7} | Karketu Dili | Cacusan | 10–0 (A) | 30 June 2018 |
| (Timor-Leste) Henrique Cruz^{4} | Boavista | Cacusan | 10–1 (A) | 22 July 2018 |
| (Brazil) Fábio Christian^{4} | Atlético Ultramar | Cacusan | 8–0 (H) | 27 July 2018 |

Notes:
(H) – Home; (A) – Away
^{4} – player scorer 4 goals
^{6} – player scorer 6 goals
^{7} – player scorer 7 goals

=== Clean sheets ===
As of matches played on 29 July 2018.

| Rank | Player | Club | Clean sheets |
|---|---|---|---|
| 1 | (Timor-Leste) Diamantino Leong | Boavista | 8 |
| 2 | (Timor-Leste) Fagio Augusto | Karketu Dili | 5 |
| 2 | (Timor-Leste) Vicente Marques | Atlético Ultramar | 5 |
| 4 | (Timor-Leste) Fernando da Costa | Benfica | 3 |
| 5 | (Timor-Leste) Ramos Maxanches | Ponta Leste | 2 |
| 6 | (Timor-Leste) | DIT | 1 |

=== Own goals ===
As of matches played on 29 July 2018.

| Rank | Player | For | Against | Date | Goals |
|---|---|---|---|---|---|
| 1 | (Timor-Leste) Anito Cesario | Karketu Dili | Cacusan | 13 April 2018 | 1 |
| 1 | (Timor-Leste) Dino Amaral | Karketu Dili | DIT | 18 June 2018 | 1 |

== See also ==
- 2018 LFA Segunda
- 2018 Taça 12 de Novembro
