= Djedi (disambiguation) =

Djedi is the name of a fictional ancient Egyptian magician appearing in the Westcar Papyrus.

Djedi may also refer to:

- Djedi Project, a robotic expedition for studying the Great Pyramid of Giza
- Prince Djedi, an Egyptian prince who lived during the Fourth Dynasty of Egypt, who may have inspired the story of the magician
- Djedi River, a wadi in Algeria

== See also ==
- Dedi (disambiguation)
