= Jandre =

Jandre is a traditionally masculine given name. Notable people with the name include:

- Jandré Blom, South African rugby union player
- Jandre Coetzee, South African cricketer
- Jandré Marais, South African rugby union footballer
- Jandre van Wyk, South African cricketer

== See also ==
- Claudio Luis Jandre Sobrinho, Brazilian footballer
