= Suprayogi =

Suprayogi is an Indonesian surname. Notable people with this surname include:

- Agung Suprayogi (born 1984), Indonesian former football player
- Dadang Suprayogi (1914–1998), Indonesian military officer and politician
