= Agi Pratama =

Indonesian footballer (born 1996)

Personal information
- Full name: Agi Pratama
- Date of birth: 17 March 1996 (age 30)
- Place of birth: Banjarmasin, Indonesia
- Height: 1.80 m (5 ft 11 in)
- Positions: Forward; attacking midfielder

Team information
- Current team: Persenus Nusantara
- Number: 96

Youth career
- 2013: Peseban Banjarmasin
- 2014–2015: Barito Putera

Senior career*
Years	Team	Apps	(Gls)
2015–2017	Barito Putera	24	(3)
2017	→ PSPS Riau (loan)	0	(0)
2017	→ PSS Sleman (loan)	5	(0)
2018	PSM Makassar	1	(0)
2019	Babel United	9	(1)
2019	Martapura	11	(1)
2020	Sriwijaya	1	(0)
2021–2022	Persis Solo	8	(0)
2022	Nusantara United	6	(0)
2023	Persiba Balikpapan	3	(0)
2023–2024	Kalteng Putra	7	(0)
2025–	Persenus Nusantara	9	(1)
- * Club domestic league appearances and goals as of 17 February 2026 (UTC)

Agi Pratama (born 17 March 1996, in Banjarmasin) is an Indonesian professional footballer who plays as a forward and attacking midfielder for Liga 4 club Persenus Nusantara.

== Club career ==
=== PS Barito Putera ===
Agi is the youngest player in the PS Barito Putera squad. He played his first match in the 2015 Indonesia Super League as a substitute and scored of goal for a Barito Putera 2–0 win over Persela Lamongan after Talaohu Musafri also scored at the end of the game.

In the 2016 season, in the second half, Agi replaced Paulo Sitanggang and scored against Persegres Gresik United.

=== PSPS Pekanbaru ===
In half season of Indonesian Liga 1 2017 edition, he has been loaned from Barito to PSPS Pekanbaru.

=== PSS Sleman ===
Agi move from PSPS to PSS in round of 16 of 2017 Liga 2 seasons, because coach Freddy Muli want to enhance strikers in his team squad.

In the match against Cilegon United, Agi give one assist, and match end in draw 2-2.

== Honours ==
=== Club ===
Persis Solo

- Liga 2: 2021
