= Daniel Tata =

Indonesian footballer

Personal information
- Full name: Daniel Siogama Tata
- Date of birth: 9 August 1990 (age 36)
- Place of birth: Jayapura, Indonesia
- Height: 1.72 m (5 ft 7 1/2 in)
- Positions: Defender; defensive midfielder

Youth career
- 2010–2011: Persipura U-21

Senior career*
Years	Team	Apps	(Gls)
2011–2015	Persipura Jayapura	59	(3)
2016	PSM Makassar	10	(0)
2017	Barito Putera	4	(0)
2017–2018	PSBS Biak	17	(0)

International career^{‡}
2013	Indonesia U-23	1	(0)
- * Club domestic league appearances and goals as of November 2014 ‡ National team caps and goals as of 8 June 2013

Daniel Siogama Tata (born on August 9, 1990) is an Indonesian footballer who plays as a defender or defensive midfielder.

== Club career statistics ==
As of 11 July 2012.

Club performance			League		Cup		League Cup		Continental		Total	
Season	Club	League	Apps	Goals	Apps	Goals	Apps	Goals	Apps	Goals	Apps	Goals
Indonesia			League		Piala Indonesia		League Cup		Asia		Total	
2011–12	Persipura Jayapura	Super League	7	0	-		-		0	0	7	0
2013	Persipura Jayapura	Super League	1	0	-		-		0	0	1	0
Total	Indonesia		8	0	-		-		0	0	8	0
Career total			8	0	-		-		0	0	8	0
