= Mustaid Billah =

Indonesian footballer

Personal information
- Full name: Mustaid Billah
- Date of birth: 30 March 1992 (age 34)
- Place of birth: Balikpapan, Indonesia
- Height: 1.84 m (6 ft 1/2 in)
- Position: Midfielder

Senior career*
Years	Team	Apps	(Gls)
2013–2015	Persiba Balikpapan	42	(6)

International career
2012	Indonesia U 22	1	(0)
- * Club domestic league appearances and goals

Mustaid Billah (born on 30 March 1992) is an Indonesian former footballer.
