= Aidin Elmi =

Indonesian footballer

Personal information
- Full name: Aidin Elmi
- Date of birth: 13 June 1986 (age 40)
- Place of birth: Balikpapan, East Kalimantan, Indonesia
- Height: 1.75 m (5 ft 9 in)
- Position: Defender

Senior career*
Years	Team	Apps	(Gls)
2008–2010	Persiba Balikpapan	1	(0)
2010–2011	Bontang	12	(0)
2011–2013	Persiram Raja Ampat	14	(0)
2014–2017	Persiba Bantul	37	(1)
- * Club domestic league appearances and goals

Aidin Elmi (born June 13, 1986) is an Indonesian former footballer.

== Club statistics ==
Club	Season	Super League		Premier Division		Piala Indonesia		Total	
Club	Season	Apps	Goals	Apps	Goals	Apps	Goals	Apps	Goals
Persiram Raja Ampat	2009-10	1	0	-		-		1	0
Persiram Raja Ampat	2010-11	12	0	-		-		12	0
Persiram Raja Ampat	2011-12	14	0	-		-		14	0
Total		27	0	-		-		27	0
