= Absor Fauzi =

Indonesian footballer

Personal information
- Full name: Absor Fauzi
- Date of birth: 11 August 1988 (age 38)
- Place of birth: Bandung, West Java, Indonesia
- Height: 1.82 m (5 ft 11 1/2 in)
- Position: Defender

Senior career*
| Years | Team | Apps | (Gls) |
| 2010–2017 | Persiba Balikpapan | 71 | (0) |
| 2018 | PSS Sleman | 7 | (0) |
| 2018–2019 | Persis Solo | 10 | (0) |
| 2019–2020 | Persik Kediri | 13 | (0) |
- * Club domestic league appearances and goals as of 5 January 2019

Absor Fauzi (born August 11, 1988, in Bandung) is an Indonesian former professional footballer.

== Club career statistics ==
As of 5 January 2013.

| Club performance | | | League | | Cup | | League Cup | | Total | |
| Season | Club | League | Apps | Goals | Apps | Goals | Apps | Goals | Apps | Goals |
| Indonesia | | | League | | Piala Indonesia | | League Cup | | Total | |
|---|---|---|---|---|---|---|---|---|---|---|
| 2010–11 | Persiba Balikpapan | Super League | 0 | 0 | - | | - | | 0 | 0 |
| 2011–12 | Persiba Balikpapan | Super League | 11 | 0 | - | | - | | 11 | 0 |
| 2013 | Persiba Balikpapan | Super League | 1 | 0 | 0 | 0 | - | | 1 | 0 |
| Total | Indonesia | | 12 | 0 | 0 | 0 | - | | 12 | 0 |
| Career total | | | 12 | 0 | 0 | 0 | - | | 12 | 0 |
