= Alfian Habibi =

Indonesian footballer

A. Habibi
Personal information
- Full name: Alfian Habibi
- Date of birth: 16 April 1985 (age 41)
- Place of birth: Masamba, Indonesia
- Height: 1.67 m (5 ft 5 1/2 in)
- Position: Defender

Senior career*
Years	Team	Apps	(Gls)
2004–2005	Persim Maros		
2005–2006	Mitra Kukar		
2006–2008	PSBL Langsa		
2009	Persekabpas Pasuruan	8	(0)
2009–2010	Persidi Idi		(0)
2010–2011	PSMS Medan	22	(1)
2011–2012	Gresik United	4	(0)
2012–2015	Persiba Balikpapan	34	(2)
- * Club domestic league appearances and goals

Alfian Habibi (born April 16, 1985) is an Indonesian former footballer.
