= Gilbert Dwaramury =

Indonesian footballer

Personal information
- Full name: Gilbert Richard Dwaramury
- Date of birth: 6 January 1993 (age 33)
- Place of birth: Jayapura, Indonesia
- Height: 1.70 m (5 ft 7 in)
- Position: Midfielder

Youth career
- 2011–2013: Persipura U-21
- 2014–2015: Persija U-21

Senior career*
Years	Team	Apps	(Gls)
2012	→PSBS Biak (loan)		
2014	Persija	2	(0)
2015	Persiram Raja Ampat	2	(0)
2016	Persija Jakarta	13	(0)
2017–2018	Pesemar Memberamo Raya	17	(2)
- * Club domestic league appearances and goals

Gilbert Richard Duaramuri (born January 6, 1993) is an Indonesian footballer who currently plays as a midfielder.
