= Ahmad Mahrus Bachtiar =

Indonesian footballer

Personal information
- Full name: Ahmad Mahrus Bachtiar
- Date of birth: 3 September 1987 (age 39)
- Place of birth: Jepara, Central Java, Indonesia
- Height: 1.77 m (5 ft 10 in)
- Position: Defender

Senior career*
Years	Team	Apps	(Gls)
2006–2007	Persijap Jepara	13	(0)
2008–2009	Persija Jakarta	0	(0)
2009–2010	Persijap Jepara	28	(1)
2010–2011	Persiba Balikpapan	7	(0)
2011	→ Persikabo Bogor (loan)	11	(0)
2011–2012	Sriwijaya	3	(0)
2012–2013	Persijap Jepara	19	(2)
2013–2014	Persegres Gresik	12	(0)
2015	Cilegon United	0	(0)
2016	PSIS Semarang	0	(0)
2016	Perssu Sumenep	9	(0)
2016	Persela Lamongan	5	(0)
2017	Madura	14	(0)
2018	Semen Padang	23	(0)
2019	Barito Putera	0	(0)
2019	PSIM Yogyakarta	3	(0)
2020–2021	Muba Babel United	10	(0)

International career
2007–2009	Indonesia U23		
- * Club domestic league appearances and goals as of 3 March 2020

Ahmad Mahrus Bachtiar (born September 3, 1987, in Jepara, Central Java) is an Indonesian professional footballer who plays as a defender. He previously played for Sriwijaya in the Indonesia Super League.

== Club career ==
=== Muba Babel United ===
He was signed for Muba Babel United to play in Liga 2 in the 2020 season. This season was suspended on 27 March 2020 due to the COVID-19 pandemic. The season was abandoned and was declared void on 20 January 2021.

== Honours ==
=== Club ===
Sriwijaya

- Indonesia Super League: 2011–12
