= Windu Hanggono Putra =

Indonesian footballer

Windu Hanggoro
Personal information
- Full name: Windu Hanggoro Putra
- Date of birth: 21 August 1988 (age 38)
- Place of birth: Jakarta, Indonesia
- Height: 1.78 m (5 ft 10 in)
- Position: Midfielder

Youth career
- 2006–2009: Putra Melayu

Senior career*
| Years | Team | Apps | (Gls) |
| 2009–2010 | Persija Jakarta | 0 | (0) |
| 2010–2013 | PSPS Pekanbaru | 5 | (0) |
| 2014–2016 | Persita Tangerang | 38 | (0) |
- * Club domestic league appearances and goals

Windu Hanggoro Putra (born August 21, 1988 in Jakarta) is an Indonesian former footballer.

== Club statistics ==
| Club | Season | Super League | | Premier Division | | Piala Indonesia | | Total | |
| Club | Season | Apps | Goals | Apps | Goals | Apps | Goals | Apps | Goals |
|---|---|---|---|---|---|---|---|---|---|
| Persija Jakarta | 2009-10 | 0 | 0 | - | | 0 | 0 | 0 | 0 |
| PSPS Pekanbaru | 2010-11 | 3 | 0 | - | | - | | 3 | 0 |
| PSPS Pekanbaru | 2011-12 | 2 | 0 | - | | - | | 2 | 0 |
| Total | | 5 | 0 | - | | 0 | 0 | 5 | 0 |
