= Ramadhan Saputra =

Indonesian footballer

Ramadhan
Personal information
- Full name: Ramadhan Saputra
- Date of birth: 5 May 1986 (age 40)
- Place of birth: Tangerang, Indonesia
- Height: 1.87 m (6 ft 2 in)
- Position: Defender

Senior career*
| Years | Team | Apps | (Gls) |
| 2008–2011 | Persita Tangerang | 6 | (0) |
| 2009–2010 | →Semen Padang (loan) | 12 | (0) |
| 2011–2012 | PSMS Medan | 14 | (0) |
| 2013 | Persiwa Wamena | 25 | (0) |
| 2014 | Persiba Bantul | 8 | (0) |
| 2014 | Persik Kediri | 3 | (0) |
| 2016 | Persela Lamongan | 9 | (0) |
| 2017 | Sragen United | 14 | (0) |
| 2018 | PSMS Medan | 0 | (0) |
| 2018 | Persik Kendal | 11 | (1) |
| 2019 | Cilegon United | 6 | (0) |
| 2020 | Perserang Serang | 0 | (0) |
- * Club domestic league appearances and goals as of 1 June 2013

Ramadhan Saputra (born on May 5, 1986) is an Indonesian former footballer who plays as a defender.

== Club statistics ==
| Club | Season | Super League | | Premier Division | | Piala Indonesia | | Total | |
| Club | Season | Apps | Goals | Apps | Goals | Apps | Goals | Apps | Goals |
|---|---|---|---|---|---|---|---|---|---|
| PSMS Medan | 2011-12 | 14 | 0 | - | | - | | 14 | 0 |
| Persiwa Wamena | 2013 | 14 | 0 | - | | - | | 14 | 0 |
| Total | | 28 | 0 | - | | - | | 28 | 0 |
