= Steve Hesketh =

Australian soccer player

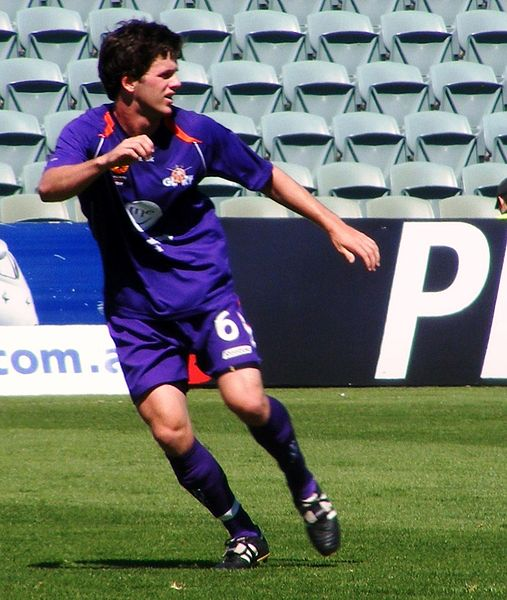
- Hesketh playing for Perth Glory's youth team

Personal information
- Full name: Steven Lewis Hesketh
- Date of birth: 15 December 1988 (age 37)
- Place of birth: Western Australia, Australia
- Height: 1.83 m (6 ft 0 in)
- Positions: Center back; left back

Youth career
- 2007–2010: Perth Glory

Senior career*
| Years | Team | Apps | (Gls) |
| 2006–2009 | Stirling Lions | 70 | (4) |
| 2010–2011 | Deltras Sidoarjo | 21 | (1) |
| 2011–2012 | Arema Indonesia | 22 | (0) |
| 2012 | Hume City | 4 | (0) |
| 2013 | Bonnyrigg White Eagles | 24 | (0) |
| 2014–2018 | Rockdale City | 140 | (2) |
| 2019–2023 | Bayswater City | 108 | (2) |
| 2024– | Mandurah City | 44 | (2) |
- * Club domestic league appearances and goals as of 23 November 2023

Steven Lewis Hesketh (born 15 December 1988), simply known as Steve, is an Australian soccer player who plays as a defender for Football West State League Division 1 club Mandurah City.
