= Dibyo Previan Caesario =

Indonesian footballer

Personal information
- Full name: Dibyo Previan Caesario
- Date of birth: 4 June 1992
- Place of birth: Indonesia
- Date of death: 30 May 2017 (aged 24)
- Place of death: Jakarta, Indonesia
- Height: 1.78 m (5 ft 10 in)
- Position: Striker

Senior career*
Years	Team	Apps	(Gls)
2013–2014	Persita Tangerang	20	(1)
2014–2015	Mitra Kukar F.C.	23	(4)
2015	Pusamania Borneo	0	(0)
2016	Aitana	7	(0)
2016–2017	Madura United	11	(2)
- * Club domestic league appearances and goals as of 15:00, 4 June 2017 (GMT)

Dibyo Previan Caesario (4 June 1992 – 30 May 2017) was an Indonesian footballer.

== Club career ==
He scored his first goal in a 2–1 loss against Persib Bandung on 31 August 2014.
