= Edy Gunawan =

Indonesian association footballer

Personal information
- Full name: Edy Gunawan
- Date of birth: 25 September 1985 (age 41)
- Place of birth: Balikpapan, Indonesia
- Height: 1.66 m (5 ft 5 in)
- Positions: Left-back; winger

Team information
- Current team: NZR Sumbersari
- Number: 4

Senior career*
Years	Team	Apps	(Gls)
2009–2011	Persiba Balikpapan	36	(0)
2011–2012	Persebaya 1927	24	(0)
2013	Persibo Bojonegoro	14	(0)
2014	Persela Lamongan	12	(0)
2015	Barito Putera	0	(0)
2016–2017	Persela Lamongan	54	(0)
2018–2019	Borneo	22	(0)
2019	→ Sriwijaya (loan)	9	(1)
2020	Persiba Balikpapan	1	(1)
2021	Hizbul Wathan	6	(0)
2022	Persiba Balikpapan	4	(0)
2023–	NZR Sumbersari	3	(0)
- * Club domestic league appearances and goals as of 15:00, 22 September 2022 (UTC)

Edy Gunawan (born 25 September 1985) is an Indonesian professional footballer who plays as a left-back or winger for Liga 3 Club NZR Sumbersari.

== Club career ==
On May 30, 2014, he joined Persela Lamongan. On November 12, 2014, he signed with Barito Putera.

== Honours ==
=== Club ===
Persebaya Surabaya

- Malaysia-Indonesia Unity Cup: 2011
- Indonesia Premier League runner-up: 2011–12
