= Muhammad Radikal Idealis =

Indonesian footballer

Radikal Idealis
Personal information
- Full name: Muhammad Radikal Idealis
- Date of birth: 1 July 1991 (age 35)
- Place of birth: Lamongan, Indonesia
- Height: 1.72 m (5 ft 7 1/2 in)
- Position: Defender

Youth career
- Persela Lamongan

Senior career*
Years	Team	Apps	(Gls)
2011–2012	PSIM Yogyakarta		
2013–2015	Persela Lamongan	18	(0)
2016–2018	PSIR Rembang	23	(1)
2019	Persatu Tuban	6	(0)
- * Club domestic league appearances and goals as of 27 April 2019

Muhammad Radikal Idealis (born July 1, 1991) is an Indonesian footballer who plays as a defender.
