= Dhanu Rosadhe =

Indonesian footballer

Personal information
- Full name: Dhanu Rosadhe
- Date of birth: 22 June 1989 (age 37)
- Place of birth: Tuban, Indonesia
- Height: 1.75 m (5 ft 9 in)
- Position: Midfielder

Youth career
- 2001–2007: PS Taruna Bahari
- 2008–2009: Persela Lamongan

Senior career*
Years	Team	Apps	(Gls)
2009–2015	Persela Lamongan	60	(0)
2016–2017	Persegres Gresik	0	(0)
2017–2019	Persatu Tuban	38	(2)
- * Club domestic league appearances and goals as of 11 July 2012

Dhanu Rosadhe (born 22 June 1989 in Tuban, Tuban Regency, East Java) is an Indonesian former footballer who plays as a midfielder.

== Club statistics ==
Club	Season	Super League		Premier Division		Piala Indonesia		Total	
Club	Season	Apps	Goals	Apps	Goals	Apps	Goals	Apps	Goals
Persela Lamongan	2009-10	3	0	-		-		3	0
Persela Lamongan	2010-11	1	0	-		-		1	0
Persela Lamongan	2011-12	18	0	-		-		18	0
Total		22	0	-		-		22	0
