= Lan Bastian =

Indonesian footballer

Personal information
- Full name: Lan Bastian Balatas Tahamada
- Date of birth: 1 April 1985 (age 41)
- Place of birth: Pasuruan, Indonesia
- Height: 1.70 m (5 ft 7 in)
- Position: Defender

Senior career*
Years	Team	Apps	(Gls)
2006–2008	Persekabpas Pasuruan	47	(4)
2009–2015	Gresik United	104	(6)
- * Club domestic league appearances and goals

Lan Bastian (born April 1, 1985) is an Indonesian former footballer who currently plays as a midfielder.
