= Achmad Rifai =

Indonesian footballer

Rifai
Personal information
- Full name: Achmad Rifai
- Date of birth: 17 November 1984 (age 41)
- Place of birth: Jepara, Indonesia
- Height: 1.80 m (5 ft 11 in)
- Position: Midfielder

Senior career*
| Years | Team | Apps | (Gls) |
| 2008–2011 | PSIM Yogyakarta | 52 | (3) |
| 2011–2013 | Persepam Madura United | 36 | (0) |
- * Club domestic league appearances and goals as of 15 September 2013

Achmad Rifai (born on November 17, 1984) is an Indonesian former footballer.
