= Deny Marcel =

Indonesian footballer (born 1983)

Personal information
- Date of birth: 24 February 1983 (age 43)
- Place of birth: Balikpapan, Indonesia
- Height: 1.80 m (5 ft 11 in)
- Position: Goalkeeper

Senior career*
Years	Team	Apps	(Gls)
2004–2005	Persiba Balikpapan	29	(0)
2005–2006	Arema Indonesia	12	(0)
2006–2007	Persim Maros	34	(0)
2007–2008	Persela Lamongan	11	(0)
2008–2009	Persiba Balikpapan	23	(0)
2009–2010	Persebaya Surabaya	12	(0)
2010–2014	PSM Makassar	31	(0)
2014–2016	Persiram Raja Ampat	27	(0)
2016–2017	PSM Makassar	7	(0)
Total		186	(0)

International career
2005	Indonesia U23		

Managerial career
- 2021–: 757 Kepri Jaya (goalkeeper coach)
- * Club domestic league appearances and goals

Deny Marcel (born 24 February 1983) is an Indonesian professional football coach and former player who is currently goalkeepers coach of 757 Kepri Jaya.
