= Fred Ferdinando Mote =

Indonesian footballer

Nando
Personal information
- Full name: Fred Ferdinando Mote
- Date of birth: 15 November 1989 (age 36)
- Place of birth: Wamena, Indonesia
- Height: 1.65 m (5 ft 5 in)
- Position: Midfielder

Youth career
- 2008–2010: Persiwa U-21

Senior career*
Years	Team	Apps	(Gls)
2010–2013	Persiwa Wamena	20	(1)
2014–2018	Perseru Serui	58	(1)
- * Club domestic league appearances and goals

Fred Ferdinando Mote or Fred Mote or just called Nando (born November 15, 1989, in Wamena) is an Indonesian former footballer.

== Club career statistics ==
As of 11 July 2012.

Club performance			League		Cup		League Cup		Total	
Season	Club	League	Apps	Goals	Apps	Goals	Apps	Goals	Apps	Goals
Indonesia			League		Piala Indonesia		League Cup		Total	
2009–10	Persiwa Wamena	Super League	0	0	3	0	-		3	0
2010–11	Persiwa Wamena	Super League	7	0	-		-		7	0
2011–12	Persiwa Wamena	Super League	13	1	-		-		13	1
Total	Indonesia		20	1	3	0	-		23	1
Career total			23	1			-		23	1
