= Sa Anun Al Qadry =

Indonesian footballer

Sa Anun
Personal information
- Full name: Sa Anun Al Qadry
- Date of birth: 18 November 1980 (age 45)
- Place of birth: Indonesia
- Height: 1.80 m (5 ft 11 in)
- Position: Defender

Senior career*
Years	Team	Apps	(Gls)
2008–2015	Persiram Raja Ampat	126	(6)
- * Club domestic league appearances and goals as of 11 July 2012

Sa Anun Al Qadry (born November 18, 1980) is an Indonesian former footballer.

== Club statistics ==
Club	Season	Super League		Premier Division		Piala Indonesia		Total	
Club	Season	Apps	Goals	Apps	Goals	Apps	Goals	Apps	Goals
Persiram Raja Ampat	2011-12	31	0	-		-		31	0
Total		31	0	-		-		31	0
