= Gideon V. Way =

Indonesian footballer

Gideon Way
Personal information
- Full name: Gideon Victor Way
- Date of birth: 7 May 1984 (age 42)
- Place of birth: Sorong, Indonesia
- Height: 1.66 m (5 ft 5 1/2 in)
- Position: Midfielder

Senior career*
Years	Team	Apps	(Gls)
2010–2016	Persiram Raja Ampat	87	(3)
2016–2018	Persiba Balikpapan	28	(0)
- * Club domestic league appearances and goals as of 11 July 2012

Gideon Victor Way (born May 7, 1984) is an Indonesian former footballer who plays as a midfielder. He previously play for Persiram Raja Ampat and Persiba Balikpapan.

== Club statistics ==
Club	Season	Super League		Premier Division		Piala Indonesia		Total	
Club	Season	Apps	Goals	Apps	Goals	Apps	Goals	Apps	Goals
Persiram Raja Ampat	2011-12	30	2	-		-		30	2
Total		30	2	-		-		30	2
