= Ronald Setmot =

Indonesian footballer

Personal information
- Full name: Ronald Setmot Reagent
- Date of birth: 26 April 1995 (age 31)
- Place of birth: Nabire, Indonesia
- Height: 1.72 m (5 ft 8 in)
- Position: Forward

Youth career
- 2011–2014: Persidafon Dafonsoro
- 2012: PON Papua
- 2014: Persiram Raja Ampat

Senior career*
Years	Team	Apps	(Gls)
2013–2014	Persidafon Dafonsoro	19	(1)
2014–2016	Persiram Raja Ampat	31	(1)
2016	Mitra Kukar	24	(0)
2022	Borac Kozarska Dubica	0	(0)
- * Club domestic league appearances and goals as of 8 February 2022

Ronald Setmot Reagent (born April 26, 1995) is an Indonesian footballer who plays as a forward.

== Career ==
=== PON Papua ===
13 September 2012, the winning goal scored by Ronald Setmot the 69th minute when the team beat West Java 1-0 (0-0) in the first match of round six branches football PON 2012 in Kaharudin Nasution Stadium, Rumbai, Riau.

=== Persiram Raja Ampat ===
The winning goal was contributed by Ronald Setmot in the final minute ahead of the game broke while defeating Mitra Kukar with the score 1–0 in their last match in the last eight Inter Island Cup 2014 at Manahan Stadium, Solo, on Wednesday, January 22, 2014.
