= Michael Onwatuegwu =

Nigerian footballer (born 1987)

Personal information
- Full name: Michael Ndubuisi Onwatuegwu
- Date of birth: June 10, 1987 (age 39)
- Place of birth: Onitsha, Nigeria
- Height: 6 ft 3 in (1.91 m)
- Position: Defender

Senior career*
Years	Team	Apps	(Gls)
2005–2009	Persiba Bantul	65	(0)
2009–2010	Vancouver Whitecaps	4	(0)
2010–2011	Bandung		
2011–2012	Persis Solo		
2012–2013	Persiba Bantul		
2013–2014	Perseman Manokwari		
2014	Gresik United		
- * Club domestic league appearances and goals as of 21 October 2009

Michael Ndubuisi Onwatuegwu (born June 10, 1987, in Onitsha, Anambra State) is a Nigerian former football player who plays as a defender.
