= Frans Freno Sauyai =

Indonesian footballer

Frans Sauyai
Personal information
- Full name: Frans Freno Sauyai
- Date of birth: 6 June 1987 (age 39)
- Place of birth: Raja Ampat, Indonesia
- Height: 1.63 m (5 ft 4 in)
- Position: Midfielder

Senior career*
Years	Team	Apps	(Gls)
2009–2015	Persiram Raja Ampat	132	(15)
- * Club domestic league appearances and goals as of 11 July 2012

Frans Freno Sauyai (born June 6, 1987), also known as Palao, is an Indonesian former footballer who plays as a midfielder.

== Club statistics ==
Club	Season	Super League		Premier Division		Piala Indonesia		Total	
Club	Season	Apps	Goals	Apps	Goals	Apps	Goals	Apps	Goals
Persiram Raja Ampat	2011-12	11	0	-		-		11	0
Total		11	0	-		-		11	0
