= Dedi Indra Sampurna =

Indonesian footballer

Dedi Indra
Personal information
- Full name: Dedi Indra Sampurna
- Date of birth: 2 April 1986 (age 40)
- Place of birth: Gresik, Indonesia
- Height: 1.75 m (5 ft 9 in)
- Position: Defender

Senior career*
Years	Team	Apps	(Gls)
2008–2009	Persikab Bandung	11	(0)
2009–2010	Gresik United	17	(0)
2010–2013	Persela Lamongan	49	(2)
2014	Persegres Gresik United	14	(0)
2015	Persepam Madura Utama	0	(0)
2016–2017	PSBI Blitar	4	(0)
2018–2019	Gresik United	13	(0)

International career
2007	Indonesia U23		
- * Club domestic league appearances and goals as of 4 July 2018

Dedi Indra Sampurna (born April 2, 1986), is an Indonesian former footballer.

== Club statistics ==
Club	Season	Super League		Premier Division		Piala Indonesia		Total	
Club	Season	Apps	Goals	Apps	Goals	Apps	Goals	Apps	Goals
Persela Lamongan	2010-11	20	0	-		-		20	0
Persela Lamongan	2011-12	10	1	-		-		10	1
Total		30	1	-		-		30	1
