= Firdaus Ramadhan =

Indonesian footballer (born 1988)

Personal information
- Full name: Firdaus Ramadhan
- Date of birth: 8 May 1988 (age 38)
- Place of birth: Tangerang, Indonesia
- Height: 1.82 m (6 ft 0 in)
- Position: Defender

Youth career
- 2008–2009: Deltras

Senior career*
Years	Team	Apps	(Gls)
2006–2007	Persikota Tangerang	11	(0)
2008–2009	Deltras	14	(0)
2009–2010	Persitara North Jakarta	17	(0)
2010–2011	Persita Tangerang	21	(0)
2011–2012	Madura United	10	(0)
2013	Persita Tangerang	20	(1)
2014	Sriwijaya	10	(0)
2016	Madura United	0	(0)
2017	Sriwijaya	12	(0)
2017–2019	Borneo	24	(0)
2020	Semen Padang	0	(0)
- * Club domestic league appearances and goals as of 23:29, 5 November 2019 (UTC)

Firdaus Ramadhan (born May 8, 1988) is an Indonesian former footballer who played as a defender.

== Career ==
=== Semen Padang ===
He was signed for Semen Padang to play in Liga 2 in the 2020 season.
