= Selsius Gebze =

Indonesian footballer

Personal information
- Full name: Selsius Gebze
- Date of birth: 8 August 1985 (age 41)
- Place of birth: Merauke, Indonesia
- Height: 1.85 m (6 ft 1 in)
- Position: Goalkeeper

Senior career*
Years	Team	Apps	(Gls)
2004–2005	Merauke Putra		
2005–2013	Persidafon Dafonsoro	104	(0)
2014	Sriwijaya	2	(0)
2015–2016	Persipura Jayapura	0	(0)
2017–2018	PSBS Biak	13	(0)
- * Club domestic league appearances and goals

Selsius Gebze (born 8 August 1985) is an Indonesian former footballer who plays as a goalkeeper.
