= M. Rizki Mirzamah =

Indonesian footballer

Rizki Mirzamah
Personal information
- Full name: Muhammad Rizki Mirzamah
- Date of birth: 31 July 1991 (age 35)
- Place of birth: Gresik, Indonesia
- Height: 1.74 m (5 ft 8 1/2 in)
- Position: Full back

Senior career*
Years	Team	Apps	(Gls)
2010–2012	Gresik United	26	(1)
2012–2014	Barito Putera	26	(0)
2015	Persela Lamongan	0	(0)
- * Club domestic league appearances and goals as of 5 May 2013

Muhammad Rizki Mirzamah (born July 31, 1991) is an Indonesian former footballer.
