= Cornelius Geddy =

Indonesian footballer

Personal information
- Full name: Cornelius Sergius Geddy
- Date of birth: 25 June 1986 (age 40)
- Place of birth: Jayapura, Indonesia
- Height: 1.70 m (5 ft 7 in)
- Position: Striker

Senior career*
Years	Team	Apps	(Gls)
2007–2008	Persisam Putra Samarinda	8	(1)
2008–2009	Persiram Raja Ampat	12	(2)
2009–2011	Bontang FC	38	(6)
2011–2012	Jakarta F.C.	34	(9)
2012–2013	Perseru Serui	3	(0)
Total		95	(18)

International career
2007	Indonesia U23		
2007	Indonesia	1	(0)
- * Club domestic league appearances and goals

Cornelius Sergius Geddy is an Indonesian former footballer who plays as a striker.

== International career ==
In 2007, he played to represent the Indonesia U-23, in 2007 SEA Games.
