= Agus Durmaturia =

Indonesian footballer

Personal information
- Full name: Agus Hendrawan Durmaturia
- Date of birth: 14 August 1992 (age 34)
- Place of birth: Wamena, Indonesia
- Height: 1.77 m (5 ft 10 in)
- Position: Defender

Youth career
- 2010–2012: Persiwa U-21

Senior career*
Years	Team	Apps	(Gls)
2011	Persiwa Wamena	12	(0)
2014–2015	Perseru Serui	0	(0)

International career^{‡}
2013–	Indonesia U-23	1	(0)
- * Club domestic league appearances and goals as of 1 June 2013 ‡ National team caps and goals as of 8 June 2013

Agus Durmaturia (born August 14, 1992) is an Indonesian former footballer.
