= Wahyudi =

Indonesian association football player

Personal information
- Date of birth: 4 April 1978 (age 48)
- Place of birth: Kediri, Indonesia
- Height: 1.75 m (5 ft 9 in)
- Position: Goalkeeper

Senior career*
| Years | Team | Apps | (Gls) |
| 2005–2007 | Persema Malang | 32 | (0) |
| 2007–2008 | PSAP Sigli | 21 | (0) |
| 2008–2010 | Persik Kediri | 37 | (0) |
| 2010–2012 | Deltras | 30 | (0) |
| 2012–2014 | Persik Kediri | 34 | (0) |
| Total | | 154 | (0) |

Managerial career
- 2014: Persik Kediri
- * Club domestic league appearances and goals

Wahyudi (born 4 April 1978) is an Indonesian former footballer.

== Club statistics ==
| Club | Season | Super League | | Premier Division | | Piala Indonesia | | Total | |
| Club | Season | Apps | Goals | Apps | Goals | Apps | Goals | Apps | Goals |
|---|---|---|---|---|---|---|---|---|---|
| Persik Kediri | 2008-09 | ?? | 0 | - | | ?? | 0 | ?? | 0 |
| Persik Kediri | 2009-10 | 3 | 0 | - | | ?? | 0 | ?? | 0 |
| Deltras F.C. | 2011-12 | 10 | 0 | - | | - | | 10 | 0 |
| Total | | ?? | 0 | - | | ?? | 0 | ?? | 0 |
