= Usman Pribadi =

Indonesian footballer

Personal information
- Full name: Usman Pribadi
- Date of birth: 19 September 1983 (age 43)
- Place of birth: Indonesia
- Height: 1.73 m (5 ft 8 in)
- Position: Goalkeeper

Senior career*
Years	Team	Apps	(Gls)
2007–2008	PSMS Medan		
2008–2009	PSDS Deli Serdang		
2009–2010	Gresik United		
2010–2011	Deltras	13	(0)
2011–2013	Persisam Putra	25	(0)
2014	Persik Kediri	4	(0)
2015	Persita Tangerang	0	(0)
2016	Persijap Jepara		
2017	PSS Sleman		
2017	Persiwa Wamena	14	(0)
2018	Persika Karawang	10	(0)
2018	Madura	41	(0)
- * Club domestic league appearances and goals as of 21 October 2019

Usman Pribadi (born September 19, 1983) is an Indonesian former footballer that last play for Madura in the 2018 Liga 2.

== Club statistics ==
Club	Season	Super League		Premier Division		Piala Indonesia		Total	
Club	Season	Apps	Goals	Apps	Goals	Apps	Goals	Apps	Goals
Deltras Sidoarjo	2010-11	13	0	-		-		13	0
Persisam Putra Samarinda	2011-12	12	0	-		-		12	0
Total		25	0	-		-		25	0
