= Arifin Ginuni =

Indonesian footballer

Arifin
Personal information
- Full name: Arifin Ginuni
- Date of birth: 26 May 1983 (age 43)
- Place of birth: Fak-Fak Regency, West Papua, Indonesia
- Height: 1.80 m (5 ft 11 in)
- Position: Defender

Youth career
- Persiram U-21

Senior career*
Years	Team	Apps	(Gls)
2006–2007	Gresik United		
2007–2008	PSKS Cilegon		
2008–2009	Persibo Bojonegoro		
2009–2012	PSAP Sigli	11	(0)
2012–2015	Persiram Raja Ampat	11	(0)
- * Club domestic league appearances and goals as of 11 July 2012

Arifin Ginuni (born May 26, 1983) is an Indonesian former footballer.

== Club statistics ==
Club	Season	Super League		Premier Division		Piala Indonesia		Total	
Club	Season	Apps	Goals	Apps	Goals	Apps	Goals	Apps	Goals
PSAP Sigli	2011-12	11	0	-		-		11	0
Persiram Raja Ampat	2011-12	11	0	-		-		11	0
Total		22	0	-		-		22	0
