= Arif Ariyanto =

Indonesian footballer

Personal information
- Full name: Arif Ariyanto
- Date of birth: 17 June 1985 (age 41)
- Place of birth: Sidoarjo, Indonesia
- Height: 1.70 m (5 ft 7 in)
- Position: Midfielder

Youth career
- Persebaya Surabaya

Senior career*
Years	Team	Apps	(Gls)
2005−2011	Persebaya Surabaya	77	(7)
2011−2012	Arema Indonesia (ISL)	24	(5)
2012–2013	Persibo Bojonegoro	19	(2)
2013–2014	Persela Lamongan	21	(1)
2014–2016	Deltras Sidoarjo	29	(0)
Total		170	(15)

International career
2005	Indonesia U20		
- * Club domestic league appearances and goals

Arif Ariyanto (born 17 June 1985) is an Indonesian former footballer who plays as a midfielder.

== Honours ==
Persebaya Surabaya

- Liga Indonesia First Division: 2006
