= Imanuel Padwa =

Indonesian footballer

Personal information
- Full name: Imanuel Permenas Padwa
- Date of birth: February 12, 1984 (age 42)
- Place of birth: Biak, Indonesia
- Height: 1.70 m (5 ft 7 in)
- Position: Midfielder

Senior career*
Years	Team	Apps	(Gls)
2006–2011	Persiwa Wamena	121	(6)
2011–2012	Persipura Jayapura	15	(0)
2012–2013	Persiwa Wamena	25	(0)
2013–2014	Sriwijaya	10	(0)
2014–2015	Persiram Raja Ampat	23	(0)

International career
2014	Indonesia	0	(0)
- * Club domestic league appearances and goals

Imanuel Permenas Padwa (born February 12, 1984, in Biak, Papua) is an Indonesian former footballer.

== Honours ==
=== Club honors ===
Persipura Jayapura

- Indonesian Inter Island Cup (1): 2011

Sriwijaya

- Indonesian Inter Island Cup (1): 2012
