= Catur Pamungkas =

Indonesian footballer (born 1989)

Catur
Personal information
- Full name: Catur Pamungkas
- Date of birth: 19 July 1989 (age 37)
- Place of birth: Malang, Indonesia
- Height: 1.76 m (5 ft 9 in)
- Position: Midfielder

Senior career*
Years	Team	Apps	(Gls)
2010–2011	Persekam Metro	19	(0)
2011–2012	Arema Indonesia	9	(0)
2013–2014	Persela Lamongan	35	(0)
2015	Persekam Metro	0	(0)
2016	Persis Solo	7	(0)
2017	Persekam Metro	10	(0)
2020	Martapura	0	(0)
Total		80	(0)
- * Club domestic league appearances and goals

Catur Pamungkas (born 19 July 1989) is an Indonesian former footballer who plays as a midfielder.

== Club career ==
=== Martapura ===
He was signed for Martapura to play in Liga 2 in the 2020 season.
