= Anindito Wahyu =

Indonesian association footballer

Personal information
- Full name: Anindito Wahyu Erminarno
- Date of birth: 13 April 1988 (age 38)
- Place of birth: Surakarta, Indonesia
- Height: 5 ft 7 in (1.70 m)
- Position: Attacking midfielder

Youth career
- SSB Putra Sukoharjo
- 2003–2004: Persiharjo Sukoharjo
- 2004–2005: Persika Karanganyar
- 2006–2007: Persis Solo

Senior career*
Years	Team	Apps	(Gls)
2007–2009	Persis Solo	17	(4)
2009–2012	Mitra Kukar	59	(16)
2012–2013	Persija Jakarta	27	(1)
2014–2021	Mitra Kukar	111	(21)
2022	Kalteng Putra	5	(0)

International career^{‡}
2014	Indonesia	2	(0)
- * Club domestic league appearances and goals as of 30 September 2022 ‡ National team caps and goals as of 25 September 2014

Anindito Wahyu Erminarno (born 13 April 1988) is an Indonesian professional footballer who plays as an attacking midfielder.

== Personal life ==
Anindito was born in Surakarta, and growing up his favorite sport was actually badminton. He joined a youth football academy with his brother at the age of eight.

== International career ==
He played a first game with the national team in a match against Nepal, but he did not earn his first cap; the match was considered unofficial in FIFA's website. His official debut came in the next game, a 2–0 win over Malaysia on 14 September 2014, replacing Dedi Hartono after 11 minutes.

== Career statistics ==
=== International ===
Indonesia national team
Year	Apps	Goals
2014	2	0
Total	2	0
