= Qischil Minny =

Indonesian footballer

Personal information
- Full name: Qischil Gandrum Minny
- Date of birth: 22 July 1988 (age 38)
- Place of birth: Kediri, Indonesia
- Height: 1.76 m (5 ft 9 in)
- Position: Forward

Team information
- Current team: Nusantara Lampung
- Number: 16

Youth career
- 2005–2007: Persik Kediri

Senior career*
Years	Team	Apps	(Gls)
2008–2009	Persiku Kudus	10	(0)
2009–2010	Persik Kediri	4	(0)
2010–2011	Barito Putera	7	(0)
2011–2012	Deltras	29	(6)
2013	Arema Cronus	1	(0)
2014	→ Persik Kediri (loan)	14	(2)
2015–2016	Persepam Madura Utama	16	(2)
2017–2018	Martapura	37	(18)
2018	PSS Sleman	4	(1)
2019	Persita Tangerang	7	(0)
2019	Madura	9	(0)
2020	Persekat Tegal	1	(0)
2021	Persik Kediri	0	(0)
2021	PSCS Cilacap	9	(1)
2022–2024	Persijap Jepara	23	(5)
2024–	Nusantara Lampung	20	(2)
- * Club domestic league appearances and goals as of 15 February 2025

Qischil Gandrum Minny (born 22 July 1988) is an Indonesian professional footballer who plays as a forward for Liga Nusantara club Nusantara Lampung.

== Honours ==
=== Club ===
PSS Sleman

- Liga 2: 2018
