= Dedi Iman =

Indonesian footballer (born 1985)

Personal information
- Full name: Dedi Iman Sukanto
- Date of birth: July 22, 1985 (age 41)
- Place of birth: Surabaya, Indonesia
- Height: 1.79 m (5 ft 10 1/2 in)
- Position: Goalkeeper

Senior career*
Years	Team	Apps	(Gls)
2007	PPSM Sakti Magelang	12	(0)
2008–2009	Gresik United	17	(0)
2009–2010	Persela Lamongan	11	(0)
2010–2011	Persema Malang	26	(0)
2011–2013	Persebaya 1927	22	(0)
2013–2014	Barito Putera	28	(0)
2015–2016	PSM Makassar	1	(0)
- * Club domestic league appearances and goals

Dedi Iman (born July 22, 1985) is an Indonesian former footballer.
