= Mario Aibekob =

Indonesian professional footballer

Personal information
- Full name: Mario Alberto Aibekob
- Date of birth: 15 July 1990 (age 36)
- Place of birth: Biak Numfor, Indonesia
- Height: 1.71 m (5 ft 7 in)
- Position: Forward

Team information
- Current team: Persenus Nusantara
- Number: 15

Youth career
- 2005–2010: PSBS Biak Numfor

Senior career*
Years	Team	Apps	(Gls)
2010–2012	PSBS Biak Numfor	18	(5)
2013–2016	Persiram Raja Ampat	8	(0)
2017	PSBS Biak	9	(0)
2018	Académica	11	(8)
2018	PSBS Biak	9	(1)
2019	Persibat Batang	9	(0)
2019	Martapura	11	(4)
2020	Sriwijaya	0	(0)
2021	Semen Padang	8	(1)
2022–2024	Kalteng Putra	11	(1)
2024–2025	Persiharjo Sukoharjo	6	(1)
2025–	Persenus Nusantara	8	(0)

International career
2013	Indonesia	2	(0)
- * Club domestic league appearances and goals as of 12 February 2026

Mario Alberto Aibekob (born 15 July 1990) is an Indonesian professional footballer who plays as a forward for Liga 4 club Persenus Nusantara.

== Club career ==
=== Sriwijaya ===
He was signed for Sriwijaya to play in Liga 2 in the 2020 season. This season was suspended on 27 March 2020 due to the COVID-19 pandemic. The season was abandoned and was declared void on 20 January 2021.

=== Semen Padang ===
In 2021, Mario Aibekob signed a contract with Indonesian Liga 2 club Semen Padang. He made his league debut on 6 October against PSPS Riau at the Gelora Sriwijaya Stadium, Palembang.

== International careers ==
He made his international debut for the Indonesia national team on 31 January 2013 in the friendly match against Jordan.
