= Claudinho (footballer, born 1981) =

Brazilian footballer

Personal information
- Full name: Claudio Luiz Jandre Sobrinho
- Date of birth: September 25, 1981 (age 45)
- Place of birth: Brazil
- Height: 1.75 m (5 ft 9 in)
- Positions: Midfielder; defender

Senior career*
Years	Team	Apps	(Gls)
- CS Alagoano
2014	Persijap Jepara	10	(2)
- * Club domestic league appearances and goals as of 5 May 2014

Claudio Luiz "Claudinho" Jandre Sobrinho (born September 25, 1981) is a Brazilian former footballer who plays as a midfielder.
