= Agus Cima =

Indonesian footballer

Personal information
- Full name: Agus Cima
- Date of birth: 8 November 1983 (age 43)
- Place of birth: Indonesia
- Height: 1.80 m (5 ft 11 in)
- Position: Full-back

Senior career*
Years	Team	Apps	(Gls)
2007–2008	PSMS Medan	12	(0)
2008–2012	PSPS Pekanbaru	107	(2)
2013–2015	Barito Putera	38	(0)
2016–2017	Martapura	21	(0)
Total		178	(2)
- * Club domestic league appearances and goals as of 5 January 2017

Agus Cima (born November 8, 1983) is an Indonesian former professional footballer who plays as a full-back.

== Club career statistics ==
As of 5 January 2013.

Club performance			League		Cup		League Cup		Total	
Season	Club	League	Apps	Goals	Apps	Goals	Apps	Goals	Apps	Goals
Indonesia			League		Piala Indonesia		League Cup		Total	
2007–08	PSMS Medan	Liga Indonesia	12	0	1	0	-		13	0
2008–09	PSPS Pekanbaru	Premier Division	24	0	1	0	-		25	0
2009–10	PSPS Pekanbaru	Super League	31	0	3	0	-		34	0
2010–11	PSPS Pekanbaru	Super League	23	0	-		-		23	0
2011–12	PSPS Pekanbaru	Super League	29	2	-		-		29	2
2013	Barito Putera	Super League	1	0	0	0	-		1	0
Total	Indonesia		120	2	5	0	-		125	2
Career total			120	2	5	0	-		125	2
