= Agung Suprayogi =

Indonesian footballer

Personal information
- Full name: Agung Suprayogi
- Date of birth: 4 December 1984 (age 41)
- Place of birth: Malang, Indonesia
- Height: 1.75 m (5 ft 9 in)
- Position: Forward

Senior career*
Years	Team	Apps	(Gls)
2008−2009	Persih Tembilahan	20	(12)
2009−2011	Persisam Putra Samarinda	26	(2)
2011−2012	Arema indonesia	10	(1)
2013−2014	Persela Lamongan	10	(0)
2014–2015	Persijap Jepara	18	(4)
2016–2017	Persik Kediri	27	(3)
2017–2018	Persatu Tuban	28	(5)
Total		139	(27)
- * Club domestic league appearances and goals

Agung Suprayogi (born 4 December 1984) is an Indonesian former footballer who plays as a forward.
