= Aditya Harlan =

Indonesian footballer

Personal information
- Full name: Aditya Harlan
- Date of birth: 17 June 1987 (age 39)
- Place of birth: Jakarta, Indonesia
- Height: 1.77 m (5 ft 10 in)
- Position: Goalkeeper

Team information
- Current team: Madura United
- Number: 26

Senior career*
Years	Team	Apps	(Gls)
2010–2011	Tangerang Wolves	18	(0)
2011–2012	Persibo Bojonegoro	24	(0)
2013–2023	Barito Putera	132	(0)
2023	→ Persita Tangerang (loan)	14	(0)
2023–2024	Persita Tangerang	11	(0)
2024–	Madura United	9	(0)
- * Club domestic league appearances and goals as of 22 November 2025

Aditya Harlan (born 17 June 1987) is an Indonesian professional footballer who plays as a goalkeeper for Super League club Madura United.

== Honours ==
=== Club ===
Persibo Bojonegoro

- Piala Indonesia: 2012
