= Dian Agus =

Indonesian footballer (born 1985)

Personal information
- Full name: Dian Agus Prasetyo
- Date of birth: 3 August 1985 (age 41)
- Place of birth: Ponorogo, Indonesia
- Height: 1.85 m (6 ft 1 in)
- Position: Goalkeeper

Senior career*
Years	Team	Apps	(Gls)
2005–2007	Petrokimia Putra Gresik	8	(0)
2007–2011	Pelita Jaya	74	(0)
2011–2012	Arema Indonesia	1	(0)
2012–2013	Barito Putera	14	(0)
2013–2014	Mitra Kukar	20	(0)
2014–2015	Sriwijaya	3	(0)
2016–2017	Borneo	25	(0)
2017	Persiba Balikpapan	7	(0)
2018	Barito Putera	7	(0)
2019	Persela Lamongan	11	(0)
2020–2022	Persik Kediri	4	(0)
2022	PSPS Riau	1	(0)
Total		175	(0)

International career
2006–2007	Indonesia U23	5	(0)
2007–2014	Indonesia	5	(0)
- * Club domestic league appearances and goals

Dian Agus Prasetyo (born 3 August 1985) is an Indonesian former footballer who plays as a goalkeeper.

== Club career ==
On 30 November 2014, he was signed by Sriwijaya.

== Career statistics ==
=== International appearances ===
Indonesia national team
Year	Apps	Goals
2007	1	0
2008	2	0
2014	2	0
Total	5	0
