= Dedi Hartono =

Indonesian footballer

Personal information
- Full name: Dedi Hartono
- Date of birth: 12 December 1987 (age 38)
- Place of birth: Bandar Lampung, Indonesia
- Height: 1.65 m (5 ft 5 in)
- Position: Winger

Team information
- Current team: Sumsel United
- Number: 9

Senior career*
Years	Team	Apps	(Gls)
2006–2012	Semen Padang	103	(12)
2013–2015	Barito Putera	55	(5)
2015	Martapura	0	(0)
2015	Persija	0	(0)
2016	PS Polri	0	(0)
2016–2017	Barito Putera	39	(5)
2018	Mitra Kukar	34	(3)
2019	Semen Padang	32	(0)
2020	Borneo FC	3	(0)
2021	Sriwijaya	13	(6)
2022	Persiraja	3	(0)
2022	Barito Putera	13	(0)
2023–2026	Adhyaksa	49	(7)
2026–	Sumsel United	1	(0)

International career
2014	Indonesia	3	(0)
- * Club domestic league appearances and goals as of 13 September 2026

Dedi Hartono (born in Bandar Lampung 12 December 1987) is an Indonesian professional footballer who plays as a winger for Championship club Sumsel United.

== International career ==
=== International appearances ===
As of 5 September 2014

Indonesia national team
Year	Apps	Goals
2014	3	0
Total	3	0

== Honours ==
=== Club honors ===
Semen Padang

- Indonesia Premier League: 2011-12

=== Individual ===
- Liga 2 Best XI: 2021
