= 2008–09 Indonesia Super League =

Indonesia Super League
- Season: 2008–09
- Dates: 12 July 2008 – 10 June 2009
- Champions: Persipura; 1st ISL title 2nd Indonesian title
- Relegated: Deltras; Persita; PSIS; PSMS
- AFC Champions League: Persipura; Sriwijaya
- AFC Cup: Persiwa
- Matches: 306
- Goals: 814 (2.66 per match)
- Top goalscorer: Boaz Solossa; Cristian Gonzáles (28 goals each)
- Biggest home win: Persiwa 6–0 PSIS (1 April 2009); Sriwijaya 6–0 Persita (18 October 2008); Persipura 6–0 Persija (9 October 2008)
- Biggest away win: Arema 0–5 Persipura (28 February 2009)
- Highest scoring: Deltras 5–3 PSM (10 June 2009)
- Longest winning run: Persipura (9 games) ended 20 May 2009
- Longest unbeaten run: Persib (17 games) ended 5 May 2009
- Longest losing run: PSIS (6 games) ended 21 May 2009; Persita (6 games) ended 24 May 2009

The 2008–09 Indonesia Super League was the first edition of the Indonesia Super League, which replaced the Premier Division as the top-tier football competition in the country. The league was sponsored by Djarum and was officially called Djarum Super Liga Indonesia (SLI) or Djarum Indonesia Super League (ISL).

Persipura clinched the title after winning a match 3–1 against Persija on 17 May 2009. This was their first Indonesia Super League title and second title, counting the Premier Division era.

== Teams ==
The teams in 2008–09 Indonesia Super League season:

Locations of the teams in Djarum ISL 2008–09

| Team | City/Regency | Province | Stadium | Capacity |
|---|---|---|---|---|
| Arema | Malang | East Java | Kanjuruhan | 35,000 |
| Deltras | Sidoarjo | East Java | Gelora Delta | 35,000 |
| Pelita Jaya | Bandung | West Java | Si Jalak Harupat | 27,000 |
| Persela | Lamongan | East Java | Surajaya | 15,000 |
| Persib | Bandung | West Java | Siliwangi | 15,000 |
| Persiba | Balikpapan | East Kalimantan | Persiba Stadium | 12,500 |
| Persija | Jakarta | DKI Jakarta | Lebak Bulus | 12,500 |
| Persijap | Jepara | Central Java | Gelora Bumi Kartini | 25,000 |
| Persik | Kediri | East Java | Brawijaya | 20,000 |
| Persipura | Jayapura | Papua | Mandala | 17,000 |
| Persita | Tangerang | Banten | Benteng | 25,000 |
| Persitara | North Jakarta | DKI Jakarta | Tugu | 10,000 |
| Persiwa | Wamena | Papua | Pendidikan | 15,000 |
| PKT Bontang | Bontang | East Kalimantan | Mulawarman | 10,000 |
| PSIS | Semarang | Central Java | Jatidiri | 25,000 |
| PSM | Makassar | South Sulawesi | Andi Mattalata | 15,000 |
| PSMS | Medan | North Sumatera | Teladan | 20,000 |
| Sriwijaya | Palembang | South Sumatera | Gelora Sriwijaya | 30,000 |

=== Personnel and sponsoring ===
| Team | Coach | Captain | Kit manufacturer | Shirt sponsor |
|---|---|---|---|---|
| Arema | (Indonesia) Gusnul Yakin | (Indonesia) Suroso | Puma | Bentoel |
| Deltras | (Indonesia) Zein Alhadad | (Paraguay) Christian René Martínez | Nike | Bakrie Group |
| Pelita Jaya | (Singapore) Fandi Ahmad | (Brazil) Cristiano Lopes | Lotto | Bakrie Group |
| Persela | (Indonesia) M. Basri | (Indonesia) Choirul Huda | Adidas | None |
| Persib | (Indonesia) Jaya Hartono | (Indonesia) Eka Ramdani | Villour | None |
| Persiba | (Indonesia) Daniel Roekito | (Indonesia) Ferly La’ala | Adidas | Bankaltim |
| Persija | (Indonesia) Danurwindo | (Indonesia) Bambang Pamungkas | Diadora | Bank DKI |
| Persijap | (Indonesia) Junaidi | (Brazil) Evaldo Silva | Villour | Bank Jateng |
| Persik | (Indonesia) Aji Santoso | (Indonesia) Legimin Raharjo | Lotto | None |
| Persipura | (Brazil) Jacksen F. Tiago | (Indonesia) Eduard Ivakdalam | Lotto | Bank Papua, Bosowa |
| Persita | (Indonesia) Zaenal Abidin | (Indonesia) Cucu Hidayat | Lotto | Dewa Beton |
| Persitara | (Indonesia) Doddy Sahetapy | (Indonesia) Rahmat Rivai | UNO | Bank DKI, Bogasari |
| Persiwa | (Indonesia) Suharno | (Indonesia) Pieter Rumaropen | Lotto | Bank Papua |
| PKT Bontang | (Indonesia) Fachri Husaini | (Indonesia) Miftahul Huda | Specs | Pupuk Kaltim |
| PSIS | (Indonesia) Bambang Nurdiansyah | (Indonesia) Idrus Gunawan | Lotto | Lintas |
| PSM | (Indonesia) Hanafing | (Indonesia) Syamsul Chaeruddin | Diadora | None |
| PSMS | (Indonesia) Liestadi | (Indonesia) Ellie Aiboy | Diadora | None |
| Sriwijaya | (Indonesia) Rahmad Darmawan | (Saint Kitts and Nevis) Keith Gumbs | Reebok | Bank Sumsel-Babel |

=== Coaching changes ===
| Team | Outgoing head coach | Date Outgoing | Reason of departure | Replaced by | Date of Replacement |
|---|---|---|---|---|---|
| PSIS | (Indonesia) Edy Paryono | 23 July 2008 | Sacked | (Indonesia) Bambang Nurdiansyah | 29 August 2008 |
| PSMS | (Indonesia) Iwan Setiawan | 1 August 2008 | Sacked | (Brazil) Luciano Leandro | 24 November 2008 |
| Arema | (Indonesia) Bambang Nurdiansyah | 5 August 2008 | Resigned | (Indonesia) Gusnul Yakin | 14 August 2008 |
| Persipura | (Malaysia) Raja Isa | 20 August 2008 | Mutual consent | (Brazil) Jacksen F. Tiago | 26 August 2008 |
| Persitara | (Brazil) Jacksen F. Tiago | 26 August 2008 | Signed by Persipura Jayapura | (Netherlands) Dick Buitelaar | 5 February 2009 |
| Deltras | (Malaysia) Abdul Rahman Ibrahim | 21 September 2008 | Sacked | (Indonesia) Zein Alhadad | 25 September 2008 |
| Persiba | (England) Peter Butler | 26 September 2008 | Sacked | (Indonesia) Daniel Roekito | 26 September 2008 |
| Persik | (Moldova) Arcan Iurie | 7 November 2008 | Resigned | (Indonesia) Aji Santoso | 19 December 2008 |
| PKT Bontang | (Indonesia) Mustaqim | 9 November 2008 | Resigned | (Indonesia) Fakhri Husaini | 12 November 2008 |
| PSMS | (Brazil) Luciano Leandro | 12 February 2009 | Sacked | (Indonesia) Liestiadi | 12 February 2009 |

== Foreign players ==
| Club | Visa 1 | Visa 2 | Visa 3 | Visa 4 | Visa 5 | Former Player |
|---|---|---|---|---|---|---|
| Arema | (Liberia) Buston Browne | (Nigeria) Udo Fortune | (Chile) Patricio Morales | (Slovakia) Roman Chmelo | (Guinea) Boubacar Keita | (Cameroon) Émile Mbamba (Guinea) Souleymane Traore (Cameroon) Serge Emaleu (Cameroon) Aaron Nguimbat (Liberia) Esaiah Pello Benson |
| Deltras | (Brazil) Edésio | (Brazil) Danilo Fernando | (Paraguay) René Martínez | (Argentina) Gustavo Chena | None | (Paraguay) Roberto Acosta (Paraguay) Carlos Bergotini |
| Pelita Jaya | (Brazil) Carlos Eduardo Bizarro | (Brazil) Cristiano Lopes | (Liberia) James Koko Lomell | None | None | (Brazil) Tiago Gaúcho (Brazil) Eliviu Costa (Brazil) Leandro Camilo |
| Persela | (Brazil) Fabiano Beltrame | (Brazil) Márcio Souza | (Liberia) Alexander Robinson | (Argentina) Carlos Sciucatti | None | (Paraguay) Edgar Aranda (Cameroon) Epalla Jordan |
| Persib | (Cameroon) Nyeck Nyobe | (Brazil) Hilton Moreira | (Paraguay) Lorenzo Cabanas | (Uruguay) Cristian Gonzáles | (Brazil) Rafael Bastos | (Brazil) Fábio Lopes |
| Persiba | (Croatia) Mijo Dadić | (Australia) Robert Gaspar | (Argentina) Adrian Trinidad | (Brazil) Elisangelo Jardim de Jesus | (Argentina) Gastón Castaño | (Sierra Leone) Brima Pepito (Brazil) Bruno Zandonaide (Bulgaria) Tsvetan Zarev |
| Persija | (Cameroon) Abanda Herman | (Cameroon) Pierre Njanka | (Brazil) Fábio Lopes | (Argentina) Robertino Pugliara | (Nigeria) Greg Nwokolo | None |
| Persijap | (Paraguay) Arnaldo Villalba | (Brazil) Evaldo Silva | (Argentina) Pablo Francés | (Brazil) Amarildo | (Thailand) Paitoon Tiepma | (Argentina) Carlos Sciucatti |
| Persik | (Uruguay) Ronald Fagundez | None | None | None | None | (Uruguay) Cristian Gonzáles (Brazil) Danilo Fernando |
| Persipura | (Cameroon) Bio Paulin | (Nigeria) Victor Igbonefo | (Brazil) Alberto Gonçalves | (Nigeria) Ernest Jeremiah | (Brazil) David da Rocha | None |
| Persita | (Cameroon) Bruno Casimir | (Brazil) Antonio Placide | (Brazil) Michel Adolfo de Souza | (Cameroon) George Nicolas Djone | (Cameroon) Christian Bekatal | None |
| Persitara | (Nigeria) Prince Kabir Bello | (Cameroon) Banaken Bosoken | (Cameroon) Ebenje Rudolf | (Liberia) John Tarkpor | (Liberia) Esaiah Pello Benson | None |
| Persiwa | (Liberia) Boakay Foday | (Liberia) Erick Weeks Lewis | (Morocco) Redouane Barkaoui | (Morocco) Tariq Chaoui | (Nigeria) O.K. John | (France) Benoît Lumineau |
| PKT Bontang | (Liberia) James Debbah | (Liberia) Josiah Seton | (Paraguay) Wilfredo Genes | (Morocco) Tarik El Janaby | (Cameroon) Yves Kalamen | None |
| PSIS | (Cameroon) Jules Basile Onambele | (Cameroon) Bienvenue Nnengue | (Brazil) Antônio Teles | (Morocco) Abdelaziz Dnibi | (Brazil) Anderson Leke | (Argentina) Gastón Castaño (Cameroon) Salomon Bengondo (Chile) Edson Hoces |
| PSM | (Togo) Ali Khaddafi | (Chile) Julio López | (Argentina) Claudio Pronetto | (Togo) Lantame Ouadja | (Chile) Alfredo Figueroa | (Paraguay) Aldo Barreto |
| PSMS | (Brazil) Zada | (Brazil) Mauro Jose de Oliveira Pinto | (Argentina) Mario Costas | (Uruguay) Esteban Guillen | (Uruguay) Juan Salaberry | (Chile) Patricio Jiménez (Brazil) Tegao (Brazil) Fabrício Bastos (Nigeria) Henry Makinwa |
| Sriwijaya | (Liberia) Zah Rahan Krangar | (Nigeria) Anoure Obiora | (Saint Kitts and Nevis) Keith Gumbs | (Cameroon) Joel Tsimi | (Cameroon) Ngon A Djam | None |

== League table ==
=== Standing ===
| Pos | Team | Pld | W | D | L | GF | GA | GD | Pts | Qualification or relegation |
|---|---|---|---|---|---|---|---|---|---|---|
| 1 | Persipura (C) | 34 | 25 | 5 | 4 | 81 | 25 | +56 | 80 | Qualification for the AFC Champions League group stage |
| 2 | Persiwa | 34 | 21 | 3 | 10 | 57 | 32 | +25 | 66 | Qualification for the AFC Cup group stage |
| 3 | Persib | 34 | 20 | 6 | 8 | 63 | 40 | +23 | 66 | |
| 4 | Persik | 34 | 16 | 7 | 11 | 53 | 46 | +7 | 55 | |
| 5 | Sriwijaya | 34 | 15 | 9 | 10 | 60 | 45 | +15 | 54 | Qualification for the AFC Champions League qualifying play-off (Note: Sriwijaya qualified for the AFC Champions League as Copa Indonesia winners.) |
| 6 | Persela | 34 | 16 | 6 | 12 | 41 | 35 | +6 | 54 | |
| 7 | Persija | 34 | 15 | 8 | 11 | 61 | 48 | +13 | 53 | |
| 8 | PSM | 34 | 13 | 12 | 9 | 42 | 44 | −2 | 51 | |
| 9 | Pelita Jaya | 34 | 14 | 7 | 13 | 36 | 35 | +1 | 49 | |
| 10 | Arema | 34 | 13 | 8 | 13 | 40 | 42 | −2 | 47 | |
| 11 | Persijap | 34 | 12 | 10 | 12 | 42 | 40 | +2 | 46 | |
| 12 | Persiba | 34 | 13 | 7 | 14 | 40 | 42 | −2 | 46 | |
| 13 | PKT Bontang | 34 | 9 | 10 | 15 | 43 | 54 | −11 | 37 | |
| 14 | Persitara | 34 | 9 | 9 | 16 | 41 | 50 | −9 | 36 | |
| 15 | PSMS (R) | 34 | 6 | 13 | 15 | 41 | 54 | −13 | 31 | Qualification for the relegation play-off |
| 16 | Deltras (R) | 34 | 7 | 8 | 19 | 30 | 55 | −25 | 29 | Relegation to Premier Division |
| 17 | Persita (R) | 34 | 6 | 7 | 21 | 26 | 65 | −39 | 25 | Relegation to Premier Division |
| 18 | PSIS (R) | 34 | 4 | 9 | 21 | 17 | 62 | −45 | 21 | Relegation to Premier Division |

Source: RSSSF
Rules for classification: 1) points; 2) goal difference; 3) number of goals scored.
(C) Champions; (R) Relegated

=== Positions by round ===
| Team ╲ Round | 1 | 2 | 3 | 4 | 5 | 6 | 7 | 8 | 9 | 10 | 11 | 12 | 13 | 14 | 15 | 16 | 17 | 18 | 19 | 20 | 21 | 22 | 23 | 24 | 25 | 26 | 27 | 28 | 29 | 30 | 31 | 32 | 33 | 34 |
|---|---|---|---|---|---|---|---|---|---|---|---|---|---|---|---|---|---|---|---|---|---|---|---|---|---|---|---|---|---|---|---|---|---|---|
| Persipura | 6 | 3 | 2 | 2 | 4 | 4 | 7 | 6 | 7 | 6 | 4 | 3 | 3 | 1 | 1 | 1 | 1 | 1 | 1 | 1 | 1 | 1 | 1 | 1 | 1 | 1 | 1 | 1 | 1 | 1 | 1 | 1 | 1 | 1 |
| Persiwa | 7 | 13 | 8 | 6 | 7 | 5 | 3 | 3 | 5 | 3 | 5 | 4 | 4 | 2 | 2 | 2 | 2 | 2 | 2 | 4 | 3 | 5 | 5 | 5 | 4 | 3 | 3 | 2 | 2 | 2 | 2 | 2 | 2 | 2 |
| Persib | 1 | 7 | 11 | 12 | 10 | 8 | 8 | 8 | 9 | 9 | 9 | 7 | 6 | 6 | 5 | 6 | 5 | 5 | 6 | 5 | 5 | 3 | 2 | 4 | 3 | 2 | 2 | 3 | 3 | 3 | 3 | 3 | 3 | 3 |
| Persik | 15 | 8 | 5 | 7 | 8 | 10 | 9 | 9 | 8 | 7 | 8 | 6 | 5 | 5 | 6 | 7 | 8 | 7 | 5 | 7 | 8 | 7 | 6 | 6 | 6 | 7 | 7 | 7 | 6 | 6 | 6 | 7 | 4 | 4 |
| Sriwijaya | 9 | 5 | 3 | 3 | 2 | 3 | 2 | 2 | 2 | 2 | 2 | 2 | 1 | 3 | 3 | 3 | 3 | 4 | 4 | 3 | 2 | 2 | 4 | 3 | 2 | 4 | 4 | 4 | 5 | 5 | 4 | 4 | 5 | 5 |
| Persela | 16 | 14 | 9 | 8 | 9 | 6 | 5 | 4 | 6 | 4 | 3 | 5 | 7 | 7 | 7 | 5 | 6 | 8 | 7 | 8 | 8 | 8 | 8 | 7 | 7 | 6 | 6 | 5 | 4 | 4 | 5 | 6 | 6 | 6 |
| Persija | 2 | 1 | 1 | 1 | 1 | 1 | 1 | 1 | 1 | 1 | 1 | 1 | 2 | 4 | 4 | 4 | 4 | 3 | 3 | 2 | 4 | 4 | 3 | 2 | 5 | 5 | 5 | 6 | 7 | 7 | 7 | 5 | 7 | 7 |
| PSM | 8 | 4 | 7 | 4 | 3 | 2 | 2 | 7 | 4 | 8 | 6 | 9 | 8 | 9 | 9 | 9 | 9 | 9 | 9 | 9 | 9 | 9 | 9 | 9 | 9 | 9 | 9 | 9 | 9 | 10 | 10 | 9 | 9 | 9 |
| Pelita Jaya | 10 | 6 | 4 | 5 | 6 | 11 | 11 | 11 | 11 | 11 | 11 | 11 | 11 | 11 | 10 | 10 | 11 | 11 | 11 | 11 | 11 | 10 | 10 | 8 | 8 | 10 | 11 | 10 | 10 | 8 | 8 | 8 | 8 | 9 |
| Arema | 3 | 2 | 6 | 9 | 5 | 7 | 6 | 5 | 3 | 5 | 7 | 8 | 9 | 10 | 11 | 11 | 10 | 10 | 10 | 10 | 10 | 11 | 11 | 10 | 10 | 11 | 10 | 11 | 11 | 11 | 11 | 10 | 10 | 10 |
| Persijap | 4 | 9 | 12 | 13 | 11 | 9 | 10 | 10 | 10 | 10 | 10 | 10 | 10 | 8 | 8 | 8 | 7 | 6 | 8 | 6 | 6 | 6 | 7 | 11 | 11 | 8 | 8 | 8 | 8 | 9 | 9 | 11 | 11 | 11 |
| Persiba | 11 | 11 | 13 | 10 | 12 | 12 | 12 | 12 | 12 | 13 | 13 | 14 | 12 | 13 | 13 | 14 | 13 | 12 | 12 | 12 | 12 | 12 | 12 | 12 | 12 | 12 | 12 | 12 | 12 | 12 | 12 | 12 | 12 | 12 |
| PKT Bontang | 12 | 16 | 10 | 11 | 14 | 14 | 13 | 13 | 13 | 12 | 12 | 12 | 13 | 12 | 12 | 12 | 12 | 13 | 14 | 13 | 13 | 13 | 14 | 14 | 14 | 16 | 14 | 13 | 13 | 14 | 14 | 13 | 13 | 13 |
| Persitara | 17 | 15 | 16 | 17 | 18 | 17 | 17 | 16 | 16 | 16 | 16 | 15 | 15 | 16 | 14 | 15 | 15 | 15 | 13 | 13 | 14 | 14 | 13 | 13 | 13 | 13 | 13 | 14 | 14 | 13 | 13 | 14 | 14 | 14 |
| PSMS | 13 | 17 | 17 | 16 | 17 | 18 | 18 | 18 | 17 | 17 | 17 | 17 | 16 | 15 | 15 | 16 | 16 | 18 | 18 | 16 | 16 | 15 | 15 | 15 | 15 | 14 | 15 | 15 | 16 | 16 | 16 | 16 | 15 | 15 |
| Deltras | 5 | 10 | 14 | 14 | 13 | 13 | 14 | 15 | 14 | 14 | 14 | 13 | 14 | 14 | 16 | 17 | 17 | 16 | 16 | 18 | 18 | 17 | 16 | 16 | 16 | 18 | 17 | 17 | 15 | 15 | 15 | 15 | 16 | 16 |
| Persita | 18 | 18 | 18 | 18 | 16 | 16 | 16 | 17 | 18 | 18 | 18 | 18 | 18 | 18 | 18 | 18 | 18 | 17 | 17 | 17 | 17 | 18 | 17 | 17 | 17 | 15 | 16 | 16 | 17 | 17 | 17 | 17 | 17 | 17 |
| PSIS | 14 | 12 | 15 | 15 | 15 | 15 | 15 | 14 | 15 | 15 | 15 | 16 | 17 | 17 | 17 | 13 | 14 | 14 | 15 | 15 | 15 | 16 | 18 | 18 | 18 | 17 | 18 | 18 | 18 | 18 | 18 | 18 | 18 | 18 |

| Leader and qualification to the 2010 AFC Champions League Group stage |
| Qualification to the 2010 AFC Cup Group Stage |
| Qualification for the relegation play-off |
| Relegation to the 2009–10 Liga Indonesia Premier Division |

== Results ==
| Home \ Away | ARE | DLTA | PLTA | PSL | PSB | PBA | PSJ | PSJP | PSIK | PPR | PSTA | PJU | PWA | BON | PSIS | PSM | PSMS | SRI |
|---|---|---|---|---|---|---|---|---|---|---|---|---|---|---|---|---|---|---|
| Arema | | 1–0 | 0–2 | 1–0 | 0–2 | 2–0 | 2–2 | 3–1 | 0–1 | 0–5 | 4–1 | 1–0 | 2–0 | 1–2 | 0–0 | 2–0 | 4–3 | 2–1 |
| Deltras | 1–1 | | 2–1 | 1–0 | 0–2 | 2–0 | 0–2 | 0–1 | 4–1 | 1–0 | 0–0 | 1–1 | 0–2 | 1–1 | 2–1 | 5–3 | 1–1 | 1–1 |
| Pelita Jaya | 0–0 | 2–1 | | 1–0 | 2–1 | 1–1 | 2–1 | 1–1 | 3–2 | 0–1 | 1–0 | 2–1 | 2–0 | 1–0 | 2–1 | 1–1 | 1–2 | 2–1 |
| Persela | 2–2 | 1–0 | 1–0 | | 2–0 | 1–0 | 0–0 | 1–0 | 2–0 | 1–3 | 1–0 | 2–1 | 2–0 | 5–0 | 2–0 | 1–1 | 4–2 | 0–0 |
| Persib | 2–1 | 6–1 | 1–0 | 5–2 | | 2–1 | 2–3 | 0–0 | 3–1 | 1–1 | 2–0 | 2–0 | 2–0 | 2–1 | 3–1 | 0–0 | 2–0 | 3–2 |
| Persiba | 2–1 | 2–1 | 2–0 | 1–0 | 0–0 | | 2–0 | 1–0 | 1–0 | 1–2 | 3–0 | 1–0 | 0–0 | 1–0 | 5–0 | 1–1 | 2–1 | 1–2 |
| Persija | 1–0 | 1–0 | 1–1 | 1–0 | 1–2 | 2–1 | | 3–1 | 1–3 | 1–3 | 4–0 | 2–4 | 6–1 | 5–0 | 5–0 | 2–2 | 1–1 | 3–4 |
| Persijap | 1–2 | 2–1 | 1–0 | 3–1 | 2–3 | 5–1 | 1–1 | | 2–0 | 2–4 | 2–0 | 3–1 | 0–0 | 1–0 | 1–0 | 3–1 | 2–2 | 2–2 |
| Persik | 2–1 | 3–0 | 1–1 | 4–1 | 2–1 | 3–1 | 2–0 | 1–1 | | 2–1 | 3–1 | 0–0 | 1–0 | 2–1 | 4–0 | 1–1 | 2–1 | 2–2 |
| Persipura | 2–1 | 2–0 | 1–0 | 2–0 | 1–0 | 3–1 | 6–0 | 1–1 | 5–0 | | 3–0 | 3–0 | 2–0 | 3–1 | 4–0 | 5–0 | 1–0 | 4–1 |
| Persita | 0–2 | 1–1 | 2–1 | 1–2 | 2–4 | 1–0 | 1–1 | 2–0 | 0–2 | 1–2 | | 1–1 | 0–3 | 2–2 | 1–0 | 1–2 | 1–0 | 2–1 |
| Persitara | 0–2 | 1–1 | 1–1 | 1–1 | 4–1 | 0–2 | 1–3 | 2–0 | 2–2 | 3–3 | 3–0 | | 1–0 | 2–1 | 2–0 | 3–0 | 0–3 | 1–0 |
| Persiwa | 1–0 | 5–0 | 1–0 | 2–0 | 3–1 | 4–2 | 2–1 | 1–0 | 1–0 | 1–0 | 4–2 | 2–0 | | 1–0 | 6–0 | 2–0 | 5–0 | 1–0 |
| PKT Bontang | 1–1 | 2–1 | 5–1 | 0–0 | 1–2 | 0–0 | 1–1 | 2–1 | 2–2 | 2–4 | 2–1 | 3–2 | 1–3 | | 3–0 | 1–2 | 0–0 | 2–1 |
| PSIS | 1–1 | 1–0 | 0–3 | 0–1 | 0–2 | 1–1 | 0–1 | 0–0 | 1–2 | 1–0 | 0–0 | 1–0 | 0–2 | 1–1 | | 1–0 | 1–1 | 1–2 |
| PSM | 2–0 | 3–0 | 1–0 | 1–3 | 1–1 | 3–1 | 2–1 | 0–0 | 2–0 | 1–1 | 1–0 | 2–1 | 2–1 | 2–1 | 1–0 | | 1–1 | 1–2 |
| PSMS | 0–0 | 3–1 | 0–1 | 0–1 | 1–1 | 3–1 | 0–2 | 1–2 | 2–1 | 0–1 | 2–2 | 1–1 | 2–2 | 1–3 | 2–2 | 2–2 | | 3–1 |
| Sriwijaya | 4–0 | 1–0 | 1–0 | 2–1 | 4–2 | 1–1 | 1–2 | 2–0 | 2–1 | 2–2 | 6–0 | 3–1 | 3–1 | 1–1 | 2–2 | 0–0 | 2–0 | |

Source: RSSSF
Legend: Blue = home team win; Yellow = draw; Red = away team win.

== Promotion/relegation play-off ==
The promotion/relegation play-off match was held in SIliwangi Stadium, Bandung, on 30 June 2009. Persebaya Surabaya, the 4th-place team in the Liga Indonesia Premier Division played PSMS Medan, the 15th-place team in the Indonesia Super League. The winner would play in the Indonesia Super League the following season, while the loser would play in the Liga Indonesia Premier Division.

30 June 2009
19:00 WIB

| Persebaya | 1–1 (a.e.t.) | PSMS |
|---|---|---|
| Jairon 88' | Report | Zada 32' |
Penalties
| Batoum (penalty missed); Andi (penalty scored); Anang (penalty scored); Purwanto (penalty scored); Jairon (penalty scored); Bobby (penalty scored); Anderson (penalty scored) | 6–5 | (penalty missed) Zada; (penalty scored) Costas; (penalty scored) Andika; (penalty scored) Lubis; (penalty scored) Guillen; (penalty scored) Carbiny; (penalty missed) Okto |

Siliwangi Stadium, Bandung
Attendance: 18,000
Referee: Yandri

Persebaya were promoted to the Indonesia Super League, while PSMS were relegated to the Liga Indonesia Premier Division.

== Season statistics ==
=== Top goalscorers ===
This is a list of top scorers of the 2008–09 season.

| Rank | Player | Club | Goals |
|---|---|---|---|
| 1 | (Indonesia) Boaz Solossa | Persipura Jayapura | 28 |
| 1 | (Uruguay) Cristian Gonzáles | Persik / Persib | 28 |
| 3 | (Brazil) Alberto Gonçalves | Persipura Jayapura | 23 |
| 4 | (Cameroon) Ngon A Djam | Sriwijaya | 22 |
| 5 | (Indonesia) Bambang Pamungkas | Persija Jakarta | 19 |
| 6 | (Indonesia) Talaohu Musafri | Persiba Balikpapan | 17 |
| 6 | (Brazil) Cristiano Lopes | Pelita Jaya | 17 |
| 8 | (Nigeria) Greg Nwokolo | Persija Jakarta | 16 |
| 8 | (Brazil) Márcio Souza | Persela Lamongan | 16 |
| 8 | (Nigeria) Ernest Jeremiah | Persipura Jayapura | 16 |
| 11 | (Brazil) Hilton Moreira | Persib Bandung | 15 |
| 11 | (Chile) Julio Lopez | PSM Makassar | 15 |

14 goals

- (Indonesia) Saktiawan Sinaga (Persik Kediri)

13 goals

- (Liberia) James Debbah (PKT Bontang)
- (Indonesia) Rahmat Rivai (Persitara Jakarta Utara)

12 goals

- (Brazil) Zada (PSMS Medan)

11 goals

- (Saint Kitts and Nevis) Keith Gumbs (Sriwijaya)
- (Indonesia) Pieter Rumaropen (Persiwa Wamena)

10 goals

- (Liberia) Boakay Eddie Foday (Persiwa Wamena)
- (Argentina) Gaston Castano (PSIS / Persiba)

9 goals

- (Liberia) Josiah Seton (PKT Bontang)
- (Liberia) Zah Rahan (Sriwijaya)
- (Morocco) Redouane Barkaoui (Persiwa Wamena)
- (Indonesia) Dicky Firasat (Persela Lamongan)

8 goals

- (Paraguay) Aldo Baretto (PSM Makassar)
- (Argentina) Claudio Pronetto (PSM Makassar)
- (Brazil) Evaldo (Persijap Jepara)
- (Paraguay) Lorenzo Cabanas (Persib Bandung)
- (Brazil) Edesio (Deltras)
- (Indonesia) Aliyudin (Persija Jakarta)

7 goals

- (Brazil) Michel Adolfo de Souza (Persita Tangerang)

6 goals

- (Nigeria) Anoure Obiora (Sriwijaya)
- (Indonesia) I Made Wirahadi (Persita Tangerang)
- (Indonesia) Rahmat Affandi (PSMS Medan)
- (Argentina) Carlos Sciucatti (Persijap / Persela)

5 goals

- (Indonesia) Imral Usman (PKT Bontang)
- (Argentina) Pablo Frances (Persijap Jepara)
- (Guinea) Souleymane Traore (Arema Malang)
- (Cameroon) Emalue Serge (Arema Malang)
- (Indonesia) Fandy Mochtar (Arema Malang)
- (Uruguay) Ronald Fagundez (Persik Kediri)
- (Indonesia) Firdaus Nyong Aman (Deltras)

4 goals

- (Brazil) Danilo Fernando (Persik / Deltras)
- (Indonesia) Eduard Ivakdalam (Persipura Jayapura)
- (France) Benoît Lumineau (Persiwa Wamena)
- (Morocco) Tariq Chaoui (Persiwa Wamena)
- (Cameroon) Émile Mbamba (Arema Malang)
- (Indonesia) Arif Suyono (Arema Malang)
- (Nigeria) Udo Fortune (Arema Malang)
- (Indonesia) Budi Sudarsono (Persik Kediri)
- (Indonesia) Syamsul Chaerudin (PSM Makassar)
- (Argentina) Mario Costas (PSMS Medan)

3 goals

- (Chile) Patricio Morales (Arema Malang)
- (Cameroon) Abanda Herman (Persija Jakarta)
- (Indonesia) Airlangga Sucipto (Persib Bandung)
- (Indonesia) Eka Ramdani (Persib Bandung)
- (Indonesia) Hamka Hamzah (Persik Kediri)
- (Australia) Robert Gaspar (Persiba Balikpapan)
- (Paraguay) Arnaldo Villalba (Persijap Jepara)
- (Cameroon) Ebendje Rudolf (Persitara Jakarta Utara)
- (Paraguay) Roberto Acosta (Deltras)
- (Indonesia) Dede Hugo (Deltras)
- (Paraguay) Tarik El Janaby (PKT Bontang)
- (Indonesia) Titus Bonai (PKT Bontang)
- (Morocco) Wilfredo Genes (PKT Bontang)
- (Cameroon) Bengondo Salomon (PSIS Semarang)
- (Cameroon) Jules Basile Onambele (PSIS Semarang)
- (Indonesia) Habel Satya (Persiwa Wamena)
- (Liberia) Lewis Weeks (Persiwa Wamena)
- (Nigeria) O.K. John (Persiwa Wamena)
- (Indonesia) Jimmy Suparno (Persela Lamongan)
- (Indonesia) Ahmad Amirudin (PSM Makassar)
- (Indonesia) Aun Carbiny (PSMS Medan)
- (Indonesia) Andika Yudhistira Lubis (PSMS Medan)
- (Paraguay) Esteban Guillen (PSMS Medan)

2 goals

- (Slovakia) Roman Chmelo (Arema Malang)
- (Liberia) Buston Browne (Arema Malang)
- (Indonesia) Ahmad Sembiring Usman (Arema Malang)
- (Indonesia) Ian Kabes (Persipura Jayapura)
- (Indonesia) Ortizan Solossa (Persipura Jayapura)
- (Indonesia) Ricardo Salampessy (Persipura Jayapura)
- (Indonesia) Nova Arianto (Persib Bandung)
- (Paraguay) Carlos Bergotini (Deltras)
- (Argentina) Gustavo Chena (Deltras)
- (Indonesia) Muhammad Kusen (Deltras)
- (Indonesia) Zaenal Arif (Persib Bandung)
- (Sierra Leone) Brima Pepito (Persiba Balikpapan)
- (Indonesia) Ismed Sofyan (Persija Jakarta)
- (Argentina) Robertino Pugliara (Persija Jakarta)
- (Indonesia) Cucu Hidayat (Persita Tangerang)
- (Indonesia) Lubis Sukur (Persita Tangerang)
- (Cameroon) George Nicolas Djone (Persita Tangerang)
- (Cameroon) Christian Bekatal (Persita Tangerang)
- (Indonesia) Immanuel Padwa (Persiwa Wamena)
- (Indonesia) Vendry Mofu (Persiwa Wamena)
- (Indonesia) Miftahul Huda (PKT Bontang)
- (Brazil) Tegao (PSMS Medan)
- (Brazil) Fabrício Bastos (PSMS Medan)
- (Indonesia) Fery Ariawan (PSIS Semarang)
- (Cameroon) Bienvenue Nnengue (PSIS Semarang)
- (Indonesia) Diva Tarkas (PSM Makassar)
- (Indonesia) Zainal Arifin (Persela Lamongan)
- (Liberia) Alexander Robinson (Persela Lamongan)
- (Indonesia) Mahyadi Panggabean (Persik Kediri)

1 goal

- (Indonesia) Suroso (Arema Malang)
- (Indonesia) Zulkifli Syukur (Arema Malang)
- (Indonesia) Hendra Ridwan (Arema Malang)
- (Indonesia) Rony Firmansyah (Arema Malang)
- (Indonesia) Boy Jati Asmara (Deltras)
- (Indonesia) Dwi Joko Prihatin (Deltras)
- (Indonesia) Cornelis Kaimu (Deltras)
- (Indonesia) Djalaludin Main (Pelita Jaya)
- (Indonesia) Gendut Dony (Pelita Jaya)
- (Brazil) Carlos Eduardo (Pelita Jaya)
- (Brazil) Fabiano Beltrame (Persela Lamongan)
- (Cameroon) Epalla Jordan (Persela Lamongan)
- (Indonesia) Tommy Rifka Putra (Persela Lamongan)
- (Indonesia) Agustiar Batubara (Persela Lamongan)
- (Brazil) Fabio Lopes (Persija Jakarta)
- (Indonesia) Salim Alaydrus (Persib Bandung)
- (Brazil) Bruno Zandonadi (Persiba Balikpapan)
- (Indonesia) Muhammadan (Persiba Balikpapan)
- (Indonesia) Ade Suhendra (Persija Jakarta)
- (Brazil) Amarildo Souza (Persijap Jepara)
- (Indonesia) Doni Fernando Siregar (Persijap Jepara)
- (Indonesia) Ilham Hasan (Persijap Jepara)
- (Nigeria) Victor Igbonefo (Persipura Jayapura)
- (Chile) Edson Hoces (PSIS Semarang)
- (Indonesia) Denny Rumba (PSIS Semarang)
- (Brazil) Antônio Teles (PSIS Semarang)
- (Morocco) Abdelaziz Dnibi (PSIS Semarang)
- (Indonesia) Muhammad Agus Salim (Persita Tangerang)
- (Indonesia) Ervin Rianto (Persita Tangerang)
- (Indonesia) Supriyadi (Persita Tangerang)
- (Indonesia) Yulian Hontong (Persita Tangerang)
- (Indonesia) Ade Mustari (Persita Tangerang)
- (Indonesia) Dedi Mulyadi (Persitara Jakarta Utara)
- (Liberia) John Tarkpor (Persitara Jakarta Utara)
- (Indonesia) Tutug Widodo (Persiwa Wamena)
- (Indonesia) Yesaya Desnam (Persiwa Wamena)
- (Indonesia) Albertho Mambrasar (Persiwa Wamena)
- (Indonesia) Domertho Thesia (PKT Bontang)
- (Indonesia) Irsyad Aras (PSM Makassar)
- (Indonesia) Rachmat Latief (PSM Makassar)
- (Indonesia) Asri Akbar (PSMS Medan)
- (Nigeria) Henry Makinwa (PSMS Medan)
- (Chile) Patricio Jiménez (PSMS Medan)
- (Indonesia) Affan Lubis (PSMS Medan)
- (Indonesia) Oktovianus Maniani (PSMS Medan)
- (Brazil) Mauro Jose de Oliveira Pinto (PSMS Medan)
- (Uruguay) Juan Salaberry (PSMS Medan)
- (Indonesia) Tony Sucipto (Sriwijaya)
- (Indonesia) Wijay (Sriwijaya)
- (Indonesia) Korinus Fringkeuw (Sriwijaya)

Own goals

- (Indonesia) Miftahul Huda (PKT Bontang)
- (Indonesia) Akhmad Taufik (Persiba Balikpapan)
- (Indonesia) Sofyan Morhan (Persijap Jepara)

=== Hat-tricks ===
| Player | For | Against | Result | Date |
|---|---|---|---|---|
| (Uruguay) Cristian Gonzáles | Persik Kediri | PSIS Semarang | 4–0 | 27 July 2008 |
| (Indonesia) Bambang Pamungkas | Persija Jakarta | PSIS Semarang | 5–0 | 7 September 2008 |
| (Indonesia) Boaz Solossa | Persipura Jayapura | Persija Jakarta | 6–0 | 9 October 2008 |
| (Brazil) Márcio Souza Da Silva | Persela Lamongan | PKT Bontang | 5–0 | 13 October 2008 |
| (Nigeria) Greg Nwokolo | Persija Jakarta | PKT Bontang | 5–0 | 19 October 2008 |
| (Brazil) Leonardo Martins Dinelli | PSMS Medan | Arema Malang | 3–4 | 23 October 2008 |
| (Cameroon) Ngon A Djam | Sriwijaya | Arema Malang | 4–0 | 8 February 2009 |
| (Liberia) Boakay Eddie Foday^{4} | Persiwa Wamena | PSIS Semarang | 6–0 | 1 April 2009 |
| (Brazil) Alberto Gonçalves | Persipura Jayapura | PSM Makassar | 5–0 | 7 May 2009 |
| (Indonesia) Boaz Solossa | Persipura Jayapura | Persitara Jakarta Utara | 3–3 | 20 May 2009 |
| (Uruguay) Cristian Gonzáles | Persib Bandung | Deltras | 6–1 | 30 May 2009 |
| (Indonesia) Syamsul Chaeruddin | PSM Makassar | Deltras | 3–5 | 10 June 2009 |
| (Indonesia) Talaohu Musafri | Persiba Balikpapan | PSIS Semarang | 5–0 | 10 June 2009 |

- ^{4} : Player scored 4 goals

=== Clean sheets ===
- Most clean sheets: 18 – Persiwa Wamena
- Fewest clean sheets: 3 – PSMS Medan

== See also ==
- 2008–09 Liga Indonesia Premier Division
