= 2009–10 Indonesia Super League =

Indonesia Super League
- Season: 2009–10
- Dates: 11 October 2009 – 8 Agustus 2010
- Champions: Arema Indonesia; 1st ISL title 2nd Indonesian title
- Relegated: Persik; Persebaya; Persitara
- AFC Champions League: Arema Indonesia; Sriwijaya
- AFC Cup: Persipura
- Matches: 306
- Goals: 813 (2.66 per match)
- Top goalscorer: Aldo Barreto (19 goals)
- Biggest home win: Bontang 6–1 Persiwa (9 January 2010); Persiwa 5–0 Persela (20 January 2010); Persib 6–1 Persik (26 January 2010); Persela 7–2 Persiwa (12 February 2010); PSPS 5–0 Persiwa (10 March 2010); Persiba 5–0 Persik (13 March 2010); Arema Indonesia 6–1 Pelita Jaya (3 April 2010); Persipura 5–0 Persema (9 April 2010); Persisam Putra 5–0 Persijap (24 April 2010)
- Biggest away win: Persija 1–5 Arema Indonesia (30 May 2010)
- Highest scoring: Persebaya 5–4 Persiwa (15 November 2009); Persela 7–2 Persiwa (12 February 2010); Pelita Jaya 6–3 Persela (30 May 2010)
- Longest winning run: Arema Indonesia (4 games) ended 16 December 2009; Persipura (4 games) ended 19 February 2010; Persiba (4 games) ended 27 January 2010
- Longest unbeaten run: Persipura (25 games) until end of season
- Longest losing run: Persik (6 games) ended 24 February 2010; Persitara (6 games) ended 28 November 2009
- Highest attendance: 85,000; Persija 1–5 Arema Indonesia (30 May 2010)
- Lowest attendance: 0 (16 matches)
- Total attendance: 3,463,670
- Average attendance: 11,319

The 2009–10 Indonesia Super League was the 2nd edition of this newly born competition, which replaced the Premier Division as the top rank of football system in the country.

Persipura were the defending champions, having won their first title in the previous season, or the second title if counting the Premier Division era, equalling the record for the most top league titles, along with Persik.

The campaign began on 11 October 2009. A total of 18 teams competed in the league, 14 of which contested the 2008–09 season and four of which were promoted from the Premier Division. The title was won by Arema Indonesia. This was their second title in their history.

== Teams ==
Promoted from 2008–09 Liga Indonesia Premier Division	Relegated to 2009–10 Liga Indonesia Premier Division
Persisam Putra; Persema; PSPS; Persebaya	PSMS; Deltras; Persita; PSIS

=== Stadia and locations ===
Team	Location	Province	Stadium	Capacity
Arema Indonesia	Malang	East Java	Kanjuruhan	35,000
Bontang	Bontang	East Kalimantan	Mulawarman	12,000
Pelita Jaya	Karawang	West Java	Singaperbangsa	12,000
Persebaya	Surabaya	East Java	Gelora 10 November	35,000
Persela	Lamongan	East Java	Surajaya	12,500
Persema	Malang	East Java	Gajayana	30,000
Persib	Bandung	West Java	Si Jalak Harupat	40,000
Persiba	Balikpapan	East Kalimantan	Persiba Stadium	12,500
Persija	Jakarta	DKI Jakarta	Gelora Bung Karno	88,083
Persijap	Jepara	Central Java	Gelora Bumi Kartini	20,000
Persik	Kediri	East Java	Brawijaya	20,000
Persipura	Jayapura	Papua	Mandala	30,000
Persisam Putra	Samarinda	East Kalimantan	Palaran	67,075
Persitara	North Jakarta	DKI Jakarta	Soemantri Brodjonegoro	10,000
Persiwa	Wamena	Papua	Pendidikan	20,000
PSM	Makassar	South Sulawesi	Mattoangin	30,000
PSPS	Pekanbaru	Riau	Kaharudin Nasution	30,000
Sriwijaya	Palembang	South Sumatera	Jakabaring	40,000

Locations of the teams in the 2009–10 Indonesia Super League

=== Personnel and sponsoring ===
Team	Coach	Captain	Kit manufacturer	Shirt sponsor
Arema Indonesia	(Netherlands) Robert Alberts	(Cameroon) Pierre Njanka	Diadora	MPM Honda Motors
Bontang	(Indonesia) Fakhri Husaini	(Paraguay) Aldo Barreto	Specs	Pemkot Bontang
Pelita Jaya	(Indonesia) Djajang Nurjaman	(Indonesia) Ardan Aras	Lotto	None
Persebaya	(Indonesia) Rudi William Keltjes	(Liberia) John Tarkpor	Diadora	AIM Biscuits
Persela	(Indonesia) Hartono Ruslan	(Indonesia) Choirul Huda	Reebok	None
Persema	(Indonesia) Subangkit	(Indonesia) Bima Sakti	Lotto	None
Persib	(Indonesia) Robby Darwis	(Indonesia) Maman Abdurrahman	Diadora	Honda, Sozzis
Persiba	(Indonesia) Hariyadi	(Croatia) Mijo Dadić	Reebok	Bankaltim
Persija	(Indonesia) Benny Dollo	(Indonesia) Bambang Pamungkas	League	Bank DKI
Persijap	(Indonesia) Junaidi	(Brazil) Evaldo Silva	Lotto	Bank Jateng
Persik	(Indonesia) Agus Yuwono	(Nigeria) O.K. John	Lotto	None
Persipura	(Brazil) Jacksen F. Tiago	(Indonesia) Eduard Ivakdalam	Lotto	Bank Papua, Bosowa
Persisam Putra	(Indonesia) Hendri Susilo	(Brazil) Danilo Fernando	Lotto	None
Persitara	(Indonesia) Suimin Diharja	(Nigeria) Prince Kabir Bello	UNO	Bank DKI
Persiwa	(Indonesia) Suharno	(Indonesia) Pieter Rumaropen	Lotto	Bank Papua
PSM	(Indonesia) Tumpak Uli Sihite	(Indonesia) Syamsul Chaeruddin	Specs	PDAM Kota Makassar
PSPS	(Indonesia) Abdurrahman Gurning	(Cameroon) Herman Dzumafo	Lotto	None
Sriwijaya	(Indonesia) Rahmad Darmawan	(Saint Kitts and Nevis) Keith Gumbs	Reebok	Bank Sumsel-Babel

== Foreign players ==
Club	Visa 1	Visa 2	Visa 3	Asian-Visa 1	Asian-Visa 2	Former Player
Arema Indonesia	(Slovakia) Roman Chmelo	(Cameroon) Pierre Njanka	(Uruguay) Esteban Guillen	(Singapore) Noh Alam Shah	(Singapore) Muhammad Ridhuan	(Gabon) Landry Poulangoye
Bontang	(Togo) Ali Khaddafi	(Paraguay) Aldo Barreto	(Chile) Patricio Jiménez	(Japan) Kenji Adachihara	(Japan) Kan Kikuchi	(Paraguay) Moises Maldonado
Pelita Jaya	(Brazil) Carlos Eduardo Bizarro	(Morocco) Redouane Barkaoui	(Argentina) Estebán Vizcarra	(Thailand) Yuttajak Kornchan	(Syria) Marwan Sayedeh	(Colombia) Edison Fonseca (Jordan) Siraj Ahmad
Persebaya	(Liberia) John Tarkpor	(Chile) Patricio Morales	(Argentina) Juan Marcelo Cirelli	(Japan) Takatoshi Uchida	(South Korea) Jeon Byuk Euk	(Cameroon) Ngon A Djam (Brazil) Anderson Da Silva (Australia) Josh Maguire
Persela	(Brazil) Fabiano Beltrame	(Brazil) Leonardo Martins Dinelli	(Argentina) Franco Hita	(South Korea) Ham Hyeong-kyu	(Japan) Tomoaki Komorida	(Liberia) Varney Pas Boakay
Persema	(Cameroon) Seme Pattrick	(Brazil) Jairon	(Sierra Leone) Brima Pepito	(Australia) Robert Gaspar	(South Korea) Park Chul-hyung	None
Persib	(Uruguay) Cristian Gonzáles	(Paraguay) Christian Rene Martinez	(Brazil) Hilton Moreira	(Thailand) Sinthaweechai Hathairattanakool	(Philippines) Satoshi Otomo	(Thailand) Suchao Nutnum
Persiba	(Croatia) Mijo Dadic	(Chile) Julio Lopez	(Argentina) Robertino Pugliara	(Syria) Muhammad Albicho	None	(Iran) Hamid Reza Zakaria (South Korea) Park Jung-hwan
Persija	(Cameroon) Abanda Herman	(Senegal) Pape Abdou Toure	(Cameroon) Serge Emaleu	(Singapore) Baihakki Khaizan	(Singapore) Fahrudin Mustafić	(Paraguay) Richard Caceres
Persijap	(Brazil) Sérgio Junior	(Brazil) Evaldo Silva	(Argentina) Pablo Frances	(Thailand) Phaitoon Thiabma	None	None
Persik	(Nigeria) O.K. John	(China) Zhang Shuo	(South Korea) Han Ji Ho	(Turkmenistan) Mekan Nasyrov	(South Korea) Na Byung-yul	(Brazil) Amarildo (Chile) Patricio Morales
Persipura	(Cameroon) Bio Paulin	(Nigeria) Victor Igbonefo	(Brazil) Alberto Gonçalves	(China) Qu Cheng	None	(Australia) Matthew Mayora
Persisam Putra	(Brazil) Danilo Fernando	(Chile) Ronald Fagundez	(Cameroon) Joel Tsimi	(Thailand) Pipat Thonkanya	(South Korea) Choi Dong-soo	None
Persitara	(Nigeria) Prince Kabir Bello	(Cameroon) César M'Boma	(Paraguay) Diego Mendieta	(South Korea) Kim Jong-kyung	(Japan) Hisanori Takada	(Iran) Vali Khorsandipish (Democratic Republic of the Congo) Ladislas Bushiri (Portugal) Ernesto Brunhoso (Iran) Afshin Parsaeian Rad
Persiwa	(Cameroon) Christian Desire Kono	(Liberia) Boakay Foday	(Liberia) Erick Lewis	None	None	None
PSM	(Paraguay) Osvaldo Moreno	(Chile) Luis Pena	(South Korea) Shin Hyun-joon	(South Korea) Joo Ki-hwan	(South Korea) Park Jung-hwan	(Cameroon) Henry Njobi Elad (Chile) Cristian Carrasco (Iran) Daryoush Ayyoubi (Brazil) Daniel Baroni
PSPS	(Cameroon) Banaken Bosoken	(Cameroon) Herman Dzumafo	(Cameroon) Cyril Tchana	(Australia) Josh Maguire	None	None
Sriwijaya	(Liberia) Zah Rahan Krangar	(Nigeria) Anoure Obiora	(Saint Kitts and Nevis) Keith Gumbs	(Singapore) Precious Emuejeraye	(Uzbekistan) Pavel Solomin	None

=== Managerial changes ===
Team	Outgoing coach	Manner of departure	Date of vacancy	Table	Incoming coach	Date of Replacement
Persik	(Indonesia) Edy Paryono	Resign	11 September 2009	Pre Season	(Indonesia) Gusnul Yakin	12 September 2009
Persitara	(Indonesia) Harry Ruswanto	Sacked	28 November 2009	18th	(Netherlands) Dick Buitelaar	29 November 2009
PSM	(Indonesia) Hanafing	Sacked	3 January 2010	13th	(Indonesia) Tumpak Uli Sihite	10 January 2010
Persik	(Indonesia) Gusnul Yakin	Sacked	16 February 2010	16th	(Indonesia) Agus Yuwono	18 February 2010
Pelita Jaya	(Singapore) Fandi Ahmad	Resign	18 February 2010	18th	(Indonesia) Djajang Nurjaman	20 February 2010
Persebaya	(Indonesia) Danurwindo	Sacked	24 February 2010	14th	(Indonesia) Ruddy William Keltjes	28 February 2010
Persela	(Indonesia) Widodo C. Putro	Sacked	12 March 2010	12th	(Indonesia) Hartono Ruslan	20 March 2010
Persitara	(Netherlands) Dick Buitelaar	Resign	20 March 2010	18th	(Indonesia) Suimin Diharja	24 March 2010
Persisam Putra	(Indonesia) Aji Santoso	Sacked	23 March 2010	14th	(Indonesia) Hendri Susilo	23 March 2010
Persib	(Indonesia) Jaya Hartono	Resign	9 April 2010	4th	(Indonesia) Robby Darwis	17 April 2010
Persiba	(Indonesia) Daniel Roekito	Resign	23 April 2010	3rd	(Indonesia) Hariyadi	24 April 2010

== League table ==
=== Standings ===
Pos	Team	Pld	W	D	L	GF	GA	GD	Pts	Qualification or relegation
1	Arema Indonesia (C)	34	23	4	7	57	22	+35	73	Qualification for the AFC Champions League group stage
2	Persipura	34	18	13	3	62	32	+30	67	Qualification for the AFC Cup group stage
3	Persiba	34	15	9	10	44	31	+13	54	
4	Persib	34	16	5	13	50	36	+14	53	
5	Persija	34	14	10	10	41	36	+5	52	
6	Persiwa	34	15	5	14	57	56	+1	50	
7	PSPS	34	14	7	13	43	37	+6	49	
8	Sriwijaya	34	14	6	14	48	49	−1	48	Qualification for the AFC Champions League qualifying play-off (Note: Sriwijaya qualified for the AFC Champions League as Piala Indonesia winners.)
9	Persijap	34	13	7	14	40	45	−5	46	
10	Persema	34	13	6	15	43	52	−9	45	
11	Bontang	34	12	8	14	53	52	+1	44	
12	Persisam Putra	34	12	8	14	38	41	−3	44	
13	PSM	34	12	7	15	31	46	−15	43	
14	Persela	34	12	6	16	45	55	−10	42	
15	Pelita Jaya	34	10	9	15	42	53	−11	39	Qualification for the relegation play-off
16	Persik (R)	34	10	9	15	41	55	−14	39	Relegation to Premier Division
17	Persebaya (R)	34	10	6	18	42	58	−16	36	Relegation to Premier Division
18	Persitara (R)	34	7	7	20	36	57	−21	28	Relegation to Premier Division

Updated to match(es) played on 5 June 2010. Source: Liga Indonesia
Rules for classification: 1) points; 2) goal difference; 3) number of goals scored.
(C) Champions; (R) Relegated

=== Positions by round ===
Team ╲ Round	1	2	3	4	5	6	7	8	9	10	11	12	13	14	15	16	17	18	19	20	21	22	23	24	25	26	27	28	29	30
Arema Indonesia	1	4	1	1	2	1	1	1	1	1	1	1	1	1	1	1	1	1	1	1	1	1	1	1	1	1	1	1	1	1
Persipura	7	11	14	11	8	7	10	14	14	11	11	12	12	10	8	8	6	4	3	2	4	4	3	2	3	2	2	2	2	2
Persiba	3	2	5	5	5	3	6	5	6	3	3	5	4	3	2	2	2	2	2	3	2	2	4	3	2	3	3	3	3	3
Persib	16	17	11	9	11	13	11	8	9	9	9	11	7	5	10	5	3	3	5	5	3	3	2	4	4	4				
Persija	17	9	12	14	12	11	9	13	12	12	12	13	10	9	5	6	4	5	6	6	5	5	6	6	7	9				
Persiwa	9	6	4	6	9	8	4	7	10	7	7	8	9	7	4	3	7	9	11	9	8	8	8	8	6	6	6	5	8	8
PSPS	12	14	16	15	15	14	12	9	11	14	14	9	13	15	13	11	8	10	12	13	11	9	12	10	8	7	9	7	4	4
Sriwijaya	13	15	9	7	10	9	5	4	3	5	5	4	6	8	11	12	9	6	4	4	7	7	5	5	5	5				
Persijap Jepara	4	3	3	3	3	4	7	10	7	10	10	6	8	12	14	13	12	8	10	10	10	12	10	9	10	11	11	11	12	13
Persema	15	8	10	8	6	6	3	3	4	6	6	3	3	4	6	7	5	7	7	7	6	6	7	7	9	8	8	6	9	10
Bontang	10	12	15	16	16	17	16	16	15	16	16	14	14	16	15	15	15	15	15	12	13	11	9	11	12	12	15	15	15	12
Persisam Putra	8	13	8	13	13	15	14	12	13	15	15	15	16	13	12	14	14	14	13	14	14	14	14	13	15	14	14	16	16	14
PSM	11	7	6	12	14	10	15	15	16	13	13	16	15	14	16	16	16	16	16	16	16	16	16	14	13	13	12	12	10	9
Persela	2	1	2	2	1	2	2	2	2	2	2	2	2	2	3	4	10	11	8	8	9	10	11	12	11	10	7	10	11	11
Pelita Jaya	14	16	17	17	17	16	17	18	18	17	17	17	18	18	18	17	18	17	17	17	18	18	18	17	17	17	17	17	17	17
Persik	6	10	13	10	7	12	13	11	8	4	4	7	5	6	7	10	13	13	14	15	15	15	15	16	16	16	13	13	14	16
Persebaya	5	5	7	4	4	5	8	6	5	8	8	10	11	11	9	9	11	12	9	11	12	13	13	15	14	15	16	14	13	15
Persitara	18	18	18	18	18	18	18	17	17	18	18	18	17	17	17	18	17	18	18	18	17	17	17	18	18	18	18	18	18	18

Leader and qualification to the 2011 AFC Champions League group stage
Qualification to the 2011 AFC Cup group stage
Qualification for the relegation play-off
Relegation to the 2010–11 Liga Indonesia Premier Division

== Results ==
Home \ Away	ARE	PEL	PBY	PSL	PSMA	PSB	PBA	PSJ	PSJP	PSIK	PPR	PPSA	PSTR	PWA	PKT	PSM	RIA	SRI
Arema Indonesia		6–1	1–0	2–1	3–1	0–0	1–2	1–0	3–1	3–0	2–1	2–1	2–0	1–0	3–0	3–0	0–0	3–0
Pelita Jaya	0–2		2–2	6–3	0–0	2–1	2–1	0–2	1–0	1–1	2–2	1–0	1–0	3–1	0–0	3–1	0–0	3–2
Persebaya	2–0	2–1		2–0	1–0	2–1	0–0	0–0	1–1	0–1	0–1	5–2	3–2	5–4	2–2	2–0	0–1	0–2
Persela	1–0	2–1	0–0		2–0	1–0	0–1	3–4	2–2	3–1	1–3	1–0	1–0	7–2	1–0	0–0	3–1	3–1
Persema	1–3	2–2	3–1	1–2		3–0	2–1	1–3	3–1	3–1	2–1	0–1	3–0	1–0	1–0	1–1	3–2	1–0
Persib	1–0	2–1	4–2	2–0	4–0		1–2	0–0	1–0	6–1	0–0	2–0	2–0	3–0	2–1	2–0	3–1	1–0
Persiba	1–0	3–0	2–0	2–1	1–1	2–0		2–0	1–0	5–0	0–0	0–0	1–2	1–0	0–0	1–0	3–0	4–0
Persija	1–5	1–1	4–3	1–0	1–0	2–2	3–0		0–0	0–0	0–2	1–0	3–0	0–3 (Note: Match awarded to Persiwa because local police gave no permission to hold the match.)	3–0	2–0	2–0	1–0
Persijap	0–1	1–0	1–0	3–1	3–1	2–1	3–1	2–1		1–1	1–2	1–1	3–0	4–1	1–0	0–1	1–0	1–1
Persik	0–1	2–1	3–0 (Note: Match awarded to Persik because Persebaya didn't come to the match.)	3–2	2–1	1–3	1–0	2–1	2–3		2–2	0–0	1–1	3–0	2–2	4–0	2–0	0–1
Persipura	4–1	3–1	2–1	2–0	5–0	1–0	1–1	0–0	1–0	1–0		2–2	2–2	1–1	5–1	2–1	2–1	1–2
Persisam Putra	0–1	0–2	3–1	2–0	1–0	2–1	2–1	0–0	5–0	1–1	2–2		3–2	2–2	3–1	1–0	2–0	1–0
Persitara	0–0	1–0	1–2	2–2	1–2	2–1	1–1	0–1	0–2	1–0	0–3	1–0		1–1	1–1	1–2	5–2	5–1
Persiwa	0–2	1–0	1–0	5–0	2–1	2–0	4–0	3–0	3–1	2–0	2–2	1–0	3–0		4–0	3–0	1–1	3–0
Bontang PKT	1–2	4–2	5–1	4–1	1–2	0–2	0–0	2–2	4–1	3–0	2–2	2–1	2–1	6–1		3–0	1–0	3–1
PSM	0–2	0–0	2–0	0–0	1–1	2–1	1–0	2–1	1–0	5–3	1–1	3–0	2–1	2–0	1–0		1–2	1–1
PSPS	1–1	2–1	4–1	0–0	2–2	3–0	2–1	1–0	0–0	1–0	0–1	2–0	1–0	5–0	3–0	3–0		2–0
Sriwijaya	1–0	3–1	2–1	2–1	3–0	1–1	3–3	1–1	4–0	1–1	1–2	3–0	3–2	4–1	1–2	2–0	1–0	

Updated to match(es) played on 30 May 2010. Source: Liga Indonesia
Legend: Blue = home team win; Yellow = draw; Red = away team win.

== Promotion/relegation playoff ==
The promotion/relegation play-off match was held in Jakabaring Stadium, Palembang, on 10 Agustus 2010. Persiram, the 4th-place team in the Liga Indonesia Premier Division played Pelita Jaya, the 15th-place team in the Indonesia Super League. The winner would play in the Indonesia Super League the following season, while the loser would play in the Liga Indonesia Premier Division.

10 Agustus 2010
15:30 WIB

Persiram	0–0 (a.e.t.)	Pelita Jaya
Penalties
Giddy Karow (penalty missed); Titus (penalty scored); Gideon (penalty scored); Amiruddin (penalty missed)	2–4	(penalty scored) Barkaoui; (penalty scored) Basri Badussalam; (penalty scored) Jajang; (penalty scored) Ardan

Jakabaring Stadium, Palembang
Attendance: 7,500

Both teams remained in their respective leagues.

== Season statistics ==
=== Top goalscorers ===
Source: Soccerway, LigaIndonesia.co.id

Aldo Barreto is the top goalscorer of 2009–10 ISL with 19 goals.

Rank	Player	Club	Goals
1	(Paraguay) Aldo Barreto	Bontang	19
2	(Uruguay) Cristian Gonzáles	Persib	18
2	(Brazil) Alberto Gonçalves	Persipura	18
4	(Indonesia) Boaz Solossa	Persipura	17
4	(Liberia) Lewis Weeks	Persiwa	17
6	(Cameroon) Herman Dzumafo	PSPS	16
7	(Indonesia) Muhammad Isnaini	PSPS	15
7	(Japan) Kenji Adachihara	Bontang	15
7	(Chile) Julio Lopez	Persiba	15
10	(Saint Kitts and Nevis) Keith Gumbs	Sriwijaya	14
10	(Indonesia) Bambang Pamungkas	Persija	14
10	(Singapore) Noh Alam Shah	Arema Indonesia	14
13	(Liberia) Boakay Eddie Foday	Persiwa	13
13	(Slovakia) Roman Chmelo	Arema Indonesia	13
15	(Argentina) Pablo Frances	Persijap	12

=== Hat-tricks ===
Player	For	Against	Result	Date
(Indonesia) Noor Hadi	Persijap	Persitara	3–0	17 October 2009
(Indonesia) Andi Oddang	Persebaya	Persisam Putra	5–2	18 October 2009
(Indonesia) Korinus Fingkreuw	Persebaya	Persiwa	5–4	15 November 2009
(Indonesia) Saktiawan Sinaga	Persik	Persiwa	3–0	22 November 2009
(Saint Kitts and Nevis) Keith Gumbs	Sriwijaya	Persijap	4–0	6 December 2009
(Japan) Kenji Adachihara	Bontang	Persiwa	6–1	10 January 2010
(Indonesia) Talaohu Musafri	Persija	Persitara	3–0	20 January 2010
(Indonesia) Boaz Solossa	Persipura	Persela	3–1	10 February 2010
(Indonesia) Samsul Arif	Persela	Persiwa	7–2	12 February 2010
(Indonesia) Saktiawan Sinaga	Persik	Persela	3–2	24 February 2010
(Uruguay) Cristian Gonzáles	Persib	Persema	4–0	17 March 2010
(Singapore) Noh Alam Shah	Arema Indonesia	Pelita Jaya	6–1	3 April 2010
(Paraguay) Aldo Barreto	Bontang	Persijap	4–1	28 April 2010
(Morocco) Redouane Barkaoui	Pelita Jaya	Persela	6–3	30 May 2010

=== Clean sheets ===
- Most clean sheets: 17 – Arema Indonesia, Persiba, and Persija
- Fewest clean sheets: 4 – Persitara

== Attendances ==
Pos	Team	Total	High	Low	Average	Change
1	Arema Indonesia	473,626	35,000	0	27,860	n/a
2	Persija	352,861	85,000	0	20,756	n/a
3	Persib	314,533	30,000	168	18,502	n/a
4	PSPS	284,122	20,000	10,175	16,713	n/a
5	Persebaya	245,510	29,485	0	14,442	n/a^{†}
6	Persipura	233,702	23,000	500	13,747	n/a
7	Sriwijaya	199,153	18,000	2,235	11,715	n/a
8	Persisam Putra	180,053	19,542	5,000	10,591	n/a^{†}
9	Persik	178,956	18,575	0	10,527	n/a
10	PSM	171,388	15,756	0	10,082	n/a
11	Persijap	160,323	17,000	2,500	9,431	n/a
12	Persela	128,552	12,000	1,021	7,562	n/a
13	Bontang	118,130	11,000	2,905	6,949	n/a
14	Persema	105,923	23,000	889	6,231	n/a^{†}
15	Persiwa	103,871	12,000	0	6,110	n/a
16	Persiba	84,500	7,000	0	4,971	n/a
17	Pelita Jaya	78,692	11,000	0	4,629	n/a
18	Persitara	49,775	7,500	0	2,928	n/a
	League total	3,463,670	85,000	0	11,319	n/a

Updated to games played on 8 August 2010
Source: Indonesia Super League
Notes:
^{†} Team played previous season in Premier Division.
