= 2009–10 Persebaya Surabaya season =

Persebaya Surabaya
2009-10 season
- Owner: PT. Persebaya Indonesia
- President: Saleh Ismail Mukadar
- Headcoach: Danurwindo; Rudy Keltjes
- Stadium: Gelora 10 November Stadium, Surabaya
- Indonesia Super League: 17th (Relegated)
- Top goalscorer: Andi Oddang (11)
- Biggest win: Persebaya 5-2 Persisam Putra Samarinda
- Biggest defeat: PKT Bontang 5-1 Persebaya

In the 2009-10 season, Persebaya Surabaya qualified for the Indonesia Super League as a promoted team after defeating PSMS Medan in the Play-off round. Persebaya Surabaya was officially relegated from Indonesia Super League on August 8, 2010, after deciding not to attend and losing a "walkover" (WO) with a score of 3–0 against Persik Kediri. Disappointed with PSSI and the Indonesia Super League operator, and wanting significant changes in the Indonesian football league, Persebaya Surabaya decided to leave the official competition and play in the breakaway league, the Liga Primer Indonesia, in the next season. On October 14, 2010, a historic moment occurred when the management of PT Persebaya Indonesia signed a Memorandum of Understanding (MoU) transferring the management of the club to the Indonesian Premier League (LPI) consortium, namely PT Pengelola Persebaya Indonesia (PT PPI), so that the club could operate independently without using local government funds.

== Season overview ==
Persebaya was officially relegated on August 8, 2010, after deciding not to attend and losing a "walkover" (WO) with a score of 3–0 against Persik Kediri in a postponed match at the Gelora Sriwijaya Stadium, Palembang. Persebaya's management decided not to attend because they had previously objected to the August 8 schedule. The reason is that the schedule has been postponed three times due to problems with the match organizer. In addition, Persebaya was declared to have won 3-0 because Persik was considered to have failed to hold the match.

== Squad information ==
=== First team squad ===
No.	Name	Nat.	Signed in	Date of birth (age)	Signed from
Goalkeepers
20	Syaifudin	(Indonesia)	2009	20 July 1978 (age 47)	(Indonesia) Deltras
30	Endra Prasetya	(Indonesia)	2008	1 May 1981 (age 45)	(Indonesia) Persema Malang
24	Deny Marcel	(Indonesia)	2009	24 February 1983 (age 43)	(Indonesia) Persiba Balikpapan
Defenders
30	Anderson da Silva	(Brazil)	2008	12 May 1975 (age 51)	(Indonesia) PSS Sleman
26	Djayusman Triasdi	(Indonesia)	2009	22 August 1988 (age 37)	(Indonesia) PSM Makassar
33	Marcelo Cirelli	(Argentina)	2010	2 April 1984 (age 42)	(Myanmar) Zeyar Shwe Myay F.C.
23	Taufik Angga	(Indonesia)	2009	23 January 1987 (age 39)	(Indonesia) The academy
2	Mat Halil	(Indonesia)	1999	3 July 1979 (age 46)	(Indonesia) The academy
4	Nugroho Mardiyanto	(Indonesia)	2005	15 March 1984 (age 42)	(Indonesia) The academy
15	Anang Ma'ruf	(Indonesia)	2004	28 May 1976 (age 49)	(Indonesia) Deltras
5	Takatoshi Uchida	(Japan)	2009	20 January 1982 (age 44)	Albirex Niigata Singapore F.C.
25	Sunaji	(Indonesia)	2009	25 April 1990 (age 36)	(Indonesia) The academy
16	Satrio Syam	(Indonesia)	2009	1 October 1986 (age 39)	(Indonesia) PSMS Medan
21	Supriyono Salimin	(Indonesia)	2009	10 August 1981 (age 44)	(Indonesia) Persija Jakarta
Midfielders
99	Josh Maguire	(Australia)	2009	22 September 1980 (age 45)	(Vietnam) Ho Chi Minh City FC
11	Muhammad Taufiq	(Indonesia)	2008	29 November 1986 (age 39)	(Indonesia) PSIM Yogyakarta
29	Wijay	(Indonesia)	2009	29 December 1982 (age 43)	(Indonesia) Sriwijaya F.C.
77	Wimba Sutan Fanosa	(Indonesia)	2008	27 January 1987 (age 39)	(Indonesia) The academy
17	Arif Ariyanto	(Indonesia)	2005	17 June 1985 (age 40)	(Indonesia) The academy
9	Lucky Wahyu	(Indonesia)	2007	1 April 1990 (age 36)	(Indonesia) The academy
7	John Tarkpor	(Liberia)	2009	16 October 1986 (age 39)	(Indonesia) Persitara Jakarta Utara
22	M. Erfan Hidayatullah	(Indonesia)	2008	30 April 1986 (age 40)	(Indonesia) The academy
8	Claude Ngon A Djam	(Cameroon)	2009	24 January 1980 (age 46)	(Indonesia) Sriwijaya F.C.
32	Jeon Byung-guk	(South Korea)	2010	19 August 1987 (age 38)	(Singapore) Super Reds FC
Forwards
78	Andi Oddang	(Indonesia)	2008	16 July 1977 (age 48)	(Indonesia) Persekabpas Pasuruan
3	Andik Vermansah	(Indonesia)	2008	23 November 1991 (age 34)	(Indonesia) The academy
31	Patricio Morales	(Chile)	2010	13 September 1977 (age 48)	(Indonesia) Persik Kediri
14	Korinus Fingkreuw	(Indonesia)	2009	14 February 1993 (age 33)	(Indonesia) Sriwijaya F.C.

== Competitions ==
=== League table ===
Pos	Team	Pld	W	D	L	GF	GA	GD	Pts	Qualification or relegation
14	Persela Lamongan	34	12	6	16	45	55	−10	42	
15	Pelita Jaya	34	10	9	15	42	53	−11	39	Qualification for the relegation play-off
16	Persik Kediri (R)	34	10	9	15	41	55	−14	39	Relegation to Premier Division
17	Persebaya Surabaya (R)	34	10	6	18	42	58	−16	36	Relegation to Premier Division
18	Persitara Jakarta Utara (R)	34	7	7	20	36	57	−21	28	Relegation to Premier Division

Updated to match(es) played on 5 June 2010. Source: Liga Indonesia
Rules for classification: 1) points; 2) goal difference; 3) number of goals scored.
(R) Relegated
