= Yohanes Kabagaimu =

Indonesian footballer

Personal information
- Full name: Yohanes L.G. Kabagaimu
- Date of birth: 16 December 1980 (age 45)
- Place of birth: Mappi, Indonesia
- Height: 1.73 m (5 ft 8 in)
- Positions: Defender; midfielder

Senior career*
Years	Team	Apps	(Gls)
2006–2010	Persiwa Wamena	64	(1)
2010–2011	Perseman Manokwari	15	(0)
2011–2015	Persiwa Wamena	62	(0)
- * Club domestic league appearances and goals as of 7 December 2013

Yohanes L.G. Kabagaimu (born 16 December 1980) is an Indonesian former footballer.

== Career statistics ==
As of 27 June 2012.

Club performance			League		Cup		League Cup		Continental		Total	
Season	Club	League	Apps	Goals	Apps	Goals	Apps	Goals	Apps	Goals	Apps	Goals
Indonesia			League		Piala Indonesia		League Cup		Asia		Total	
2006	Persiwa Wamena	Liga Indonesia	1	1	?	?	-		-		1	1
2007–08	Persiwa Wamena	Liga Indonesia	31	0	?	?	-		-		31	0
2008–09	Persiwa Wamena	Super League	17	0	1	0	-		-		18	0
2009–10	Persiwa Wamena	Super League	15	0	0	0	-		3	0	18	0
2010–11	Perseman Manokwari	Premier Division	15	0	-		-		-		15	0
2011–12	Persiwa Wamena	Super League	4	0	-		-		-		4	0
Total	Indonesia		83	1	1	0	-		3	0	87	1
Career total			83	1	1	0	-		3	0	87	1
