= 2010–11 Persela Lamongan season =

PS Lamongan
2010–11 season
- Manager: (Indonesia) Subangkit
- Indonesian Super League: 13th
- Top goalscorer: Hendro Siswanto & Redouane Barkaoui (1)

The 2010–11 season, Persela will compete in the Indonesian Super League and the Piala Indonesia.

== Review and events ==
PS Lamongan recorded a surprise 8-0 win over PS Petrogres in a friendly at the Surajaya Stadium on August 18, 2010 in Lamongan, East Java.

=== Pre-season ===
Friendly; 18 August 2010	Persela	8–0	Petrogres	Surajaya Stadium, Lamongan, East Java
15:00 WIB	Goal	Report^{[usurped]}

== Match results ==
=== Legend ===
Win	Draw	Loss

=== Indonesia Super League ===
Date and time	Opponent	Venue	Result	Scorers	Attendance	Report
September 28, 2010 – 15:30	Bandung	Home	Drew 1–1	Hendro Siswanto	6,507	1, 2
October 2, 2010 – 15:30	Sriwijaya	Home	Won 1-0	Redouane Barkaoui	6,002	1, 2
October 16, 2010 – 15:30	Jakarta	Away	Lost 0–2		?	1, 2
October 19, 2010 – 15:30	Pekanbaru	Away	Lost 1-2	Fabiano Da Rosa Beltrame	14,700	1, 2
October 24, 2010 – 19:00	Arema	Home	Drew 0–0		9,034	1, 2
October 31, 2010 – 17:00	Wamena	Away	Drew 0–0		14,325	1, 2
November 3, 2010 – 14:00	Jayapura	Away	Lost 0–3		18,549	1, 2
November 7, 2010 – 19:00	Balikpapan	Home	Won 1–0	Fahrudin Mustafić	2,804	1, 2
January 5, 2011 – 15:30	Pelita Jaya	Away	Drew 2–2	Redouane Barkaoui, Hendro Siswanto	5,925	1, 2
January 8, 2011 – 15:30	Semen Padang	Away	Lost 0–1		8,872	1, 2
January 15, 2011 – 19:00	Jepara	Home	Won 1–0	Zulham Zamrud	4,339	1, 2
January 29, 2011 – 19:00	Delta Putra Sidoarjo	Away	Lost 0–2		8,675	1, 2
February 3, 2011 – 19:00	Bontang	Away	Lost 0–2		?	1, 2
February 6, 2011 – 16:30	Persisam Putra Samarinda	Away	Lost 1–4	Zulham Zamrud	11,921	1, 2
March 6, 2011 – 19:00	Bontang	Home	Won 4–1	Fahrudin Mustafić, Zulham Zamrud, Redouane Barkaoui, Kim Yong-Han	~ 15,000	1, 2

Last updated: 17 April 2011
Source: Persatuan Sepakbola Lamongan^{[usurped]}

== See also ==
- 2010–11 Indonesian Super League
