= Muhammadan (footballer) =

Indonesian footballer

Personal information
- Date of birth: 21 August 1977 (age 49)
- Place of birth: Denpasar, Indonesia
- Height: 1.79 m (5 ft 10 1/2 in)
- Position: Defender

Senior career*
Years	Team	Apps	(Gls)
2008–2011	Persiba Balikpapan	91	(1)
2011–2014	Deltras	39	(0)
- * Club domestic league appearances and goals as of 11 July 2012

Muhammadan (born August 21, 1977, in Denpasar, Bali) is an Indonesian former footballer.

== Club statistics ==
Club	Season	Super League		Premier Division		Piala Indonesia		Total	
Club	Season	Apps	Goals	Apps	Goals	Apps	Goals	Apps	Goals
Persiba Balikpapan	2008-09	30	1	-		??	0	??	1
Persiba Balikpapan	2009-10	32	0	-		??	0	??	0
Persiba Balikpapan	2010-11	29	0	-		-		29	0
Deltras F.C.	2011-12	10	0	-		-		10	0
Total		101	1	-		??	0	??	1
