= Gerardo Ortiz (footballer) =

Paraguayan footballer (born 1989)

Personal information
- Full name: Gerardo Amílcar Ortiz Garza
- Date of birth: 25 March 1989 (age 37)
- Place of birth: Encarnación, Paraguay
- Height: 1.87 m (6 ft 2 in)
- Position: Goalkeeper

Team information
- Current team: Nacional
- Number: 1

Youth career
- 2004–2010: Quilmes

Senior career*
Years	Team	Apps	(Gls)
2010–2012	Quilmes	0	(0)
2010	→ Rubio Ñu (loan)	2	(0)
2012–2013	Olimpia Asunción	0	(0)
2013–2019	Sol de América	152	(0)
2019–2023	Once Caldas	100	(0)
2024	Sol de América	27	(0)
2025–	Nacional	3	(0)

International career
2009	Paraguay U20	1	(0)
- * Club domestic league appearances and goals as of 13 August 2025

Gerardo Amílcar Ortiz Garza (born 25 March 1989) is a Paraguayan footballer who plays, as of 2024, for Nacional as a goalkeeper.

== Club career ==
Ortiz was born in Encarnación, and joined Quilmes' youth setup in 2004, aged 15. In June 2010 he signed his first professional deal with the club, being subsequently loaned to Rubio Ñu for one year.

On 20 October 2010 Ortiz made his professional debut, starting in a 1–3 home loss against Libertad for the Paraguayan Primera División championship. He was also a starter four days later, in a 0–3 loss at 3 de Febrero; it were his two only appearances of the campaign.

In the 2011 summer Ortiz returned to Quilmes, being assigned to the reserve team. In February 2012 he signed for Olimpia Asunción, but never appeared in any first team match for the club.

On 7 January 2013 Ortiz moved to Sol de América also in the top division. Initially a backup to Roberto Acosta, he overtook him in the 2014 season, but was again demoted to second-choice in 2015.

At the beginning of 2019, Colombian club Once Caldas confirmed his signing.
