= Sembiring =

Batak surname originating in Indonesia

Sembiring is one of five main Karo Batak clans (Merga Silima) originating in North Sumatra, Indonesia.

== Tradition ==
The Sembiring clan consists of 19 subclans and divided into 2 groups, namely:

One group who is allowed to eat dog meat (man biang) but not allowed to marry people with the same clan, coming from Silalahi Nabolak who later migrated into Karo. This group consists of 4 subclans, namely:

- Kembaren
- Keloko
- Sinulaki
- Sinupayung

One group who is not allowed to eat dog meat (la man biang / mantangken biang), also known as Sembiring Singombak, are descended from Tamils in South India. This group is also allowed to marry people with the same clans (although this is limited to people belonging to different subgroups, and this habit has ceased in some regions). They were adherents of the animist Pemena teachings, thus their bodies were cremated after dying and swept away with a jar on a small boat, and Muslim. This group consists of three subgroups and 15 sub-clans, namely:

- First subgroup:
  - Berahmana
  - Pandia
  - Colia
  - Gurukinayan
  - Keling
- Second subgroup:
  - Depari
  - Pelawi
  - Bunuhaji
  - Busuk
- Third subgroup:
  - Meliala
  - Maha
  - Muham
  - Pandebayang
  - Sinukapur

== Notable people ==
Notable people of this clan include:

- Ahmad Sembiring (born 1985), Indonesian professional footballer
- Tifatul Sembiring (born 1961), Indonesian politician
