= Irsyad Aras =

Indonesian footballer

Irsyad
Personal information
- Full name: Irsyad Aras
- Date of birth: 4 March 1979 (age 47)
- Place of birth: Polewali Mandar, Indonesia
- Height: 1.75 m (5 ft 9 in)
- Positions: Right back; right winger

Youth career
- 2000–2001: PS Sandeq

Senior career*
| Years | Team | Apps | (Gls) |
| 2002–2003 | Persim Maros | 29 | (0) |
| 2004–2009 | PSM Makassar | 108 | (3) |
| 2009–2011 | Persisam Putra | 50 | (4) |
| 2011–2012 | Persela Lamongan | 21 | (2) |
| Total | | 208 | (9) |

International career
| 2008 | Indonesia | 2 | (0) |
- * Club domestic league appearances and goals

Irsyad Aras (born 4 March 1979 in Polewali Mandar Regency, West Sulawesi) is an Indonesian former footballer. His brother Ardan Aras is also an Indonesian former footballer, who last played for Persijap Jepara in 2021–22 Liga 2.

== Club statistics ==
| Club | Season | Super League | | Premier Division | | Piala Indonesia | | Total | |
| Club | Season | Apps | Goals | Apps | Goals | Apps | Goals | Apps | Goals |
|---|---|---|---|---|---|---|---|---|---|
| Persisam Putra | 2009-10 | 25 | 1 | - | | 4 | 1 | 29 | 2 |
| Persisam Putra | 2010-11 | 25 | 3 | - | | - | | 25 | 3 |
| Persela Lamongan | 2011-12 | 21 | 2 | - | | - | | 21 | 2 |
| Total | | 71 | 6 | - | | 4 | 1 | 75 | 7 |
