= Syaifudin =

Indonesian footballer

Personal information
- Full name: Syaifudin
- Date of birth: July 20, 1978 (age 48)
- Place of birth: Jombang, Indonesia
- Height: 1.80 m (5 ft 11 in)
- Position: Goalkeeper

Senior career*
Years	Team	Apps	(Gls)
2006−2008	Deltras Sidoarjo	50	(0)
2008−2010	Persebaya Surabaya	30	(0)
2010−2011	Persibo Bojonegoro	24	(0)
2011–2012	Arema Indonesia	11	(0)
2012−2013	Persiwa Wamena	19	(0)
2013−2014	Persela Lamongan	12	(0)
2014−2015	Persepam Madura United	11	(0)
- * Club domestic league appearances and goals as of 2 July 2014

Syaifudin (born July 20, 1978, in Jombang, East Java) is an Indonesian former footballer who plays as a goalkeeper.
