= Habel Satya =

Indonesian footballer

Personal information
- Full name: Habel Satya
- Date of birth: 12 September 1988 (age 38)
- Place of birth: Wamena, Indonesia
- Height: 1.76 m (5 ft 9 1/2 in)
- Positions: Midfielder; winger

Senior career*
Years	Team	Apps	(Gls)
2005–2014	Persiwa Wamena	265	(31)
2015–2016	Persigubin Pegunungan Bintang	19	(0)
2017–2018	Yahukimo	18	(6)

International career
2005	Indonesia U-20		
2008	Indonesia U-21		
2006–2009	Indonesia U-23		
- * Club domestic league appearances and goals as of 27 June 2012

Habel Satya (born 12 September 1987 in Wamena, Papua) is an Indonesian former footballer who plays as a midfielder. He is known for his acceleration, pace, and agility in the field.

== Career statistics ==
As of 27 June 2012.

Club	Season	League		Cup		Total	
Club	Season	Apps	Goals	Apps	Goals	Apps	Goals
Persiwa Wamena	2005	17	1	0	0	17	1
Persiwa Wamena	2006	16	0	5	0	21	0
Persiwa Wamena	2007-08	30	1	2	3	32	4
Persiwa Wamena	2008-09	27	3	3	0	30	3
Persiwa Wamena	2009-10	30	1	0	0	30	1
Persiwa Wamena	2010-11	20	1	-		20	1
Persiwa Wamena	2011-12	14	1	-		14	1
Total		154	8	10	3	164	11
Career totals		154	8	10	3	164	11
