= Benoît Lumineau =

French footballer

Personal information
- Full name: Benoît Jean Guy Lumineau
- Place of birth: France
- Position: Forward

Senior career*
| Years | Team | Apps | (Gls) |
| 2008 | Persiwa Wamena | | (4) |
| -2012 | Parthenay Viennay | | |
| 2012-2014 | Breissure | | |
- * Club domestic league appearances and goals

Benoît Jean Guy Lumineau is a French former footballer who is last known to have played as a forward player for Bressuire.

== Career ==
In 2008, Lumineau signed for Indonesian side Persiwa Wamena.

In 2012, he signed for Breissure in the French sixth division.
