= Epalla Jordan =

Cameroonian footballer

Personal information
- Full name: Claude Jordan Epalla
- Date of birth: 21 November 1981 (age 44)
- Place of birth: Douala, Cameroon
- Height: 1.80 m (5 ft 11 in)
- Position: Striker

Team information
- Current team: Real Mataram
- Number: 99

Senior career*
Years	Team	Apps	(Gls)
2005–2007	Persita Tangerang		
2007–2009	Persikota Tangerang		
2009–2011	Real Mataram	9	(3)
- * Club domestic league appearances and goals as of 13 October 2008

Claude Jordan Epalla (born November 21, 1981, in Douala) is a Cameroonian footballer who previously played for Persikota Tangerang in the Liga Indonesia Premier Division from 2006 to 2009 and Persela Lamongan in the Indonesia Super League.
