= Yesaya Desnam =

Indonesian footballer

Personal information
- Full name: Yesaya Nickhanor Desnam
- Date of birth: 25 June 1985 (age 41)
- Place of birth: Merauke, Papua, Indonesia
- Height: 1.84 m (6 ft 0 in)
- Positions: Centre-back; left-back

Senior career*
Years	Team	Apps	(Gls)
2005–2006	PS Merauke	20	(0)
2006–2015	Persiwa Wamena	180	(5)
2015–2016	Bhayangkara	19	(3)
2016	Perseru Serui	10	(0)
2017	Persiwa Wamena	12	(0)
Total		251	(8)

International career
2010	Indonesia	1	(0)
- * Club domestic league appearances and goals

Yesaya Nickhanor Desnam or Yesaya Desnam is an Indonesian former footballer. His natural position is defender. He is the first Asmat to play for Indonesia. He was in the squad for 2010 AFF Championship.

== Honours ==
Indonesia

- AFF Championship runner-up: 2010
