= Dwi Joko Prihatin =

Indonesian footballer (born 1982)

Dwi Joko
Personal information
- Full name: Dwi Joko Prihatin
- Date of birth: 25 February 1982 (age 44)
- Place of birth: Sukoharjo, Indonesia
- Height: 1.68 m (5 ft 6 in)
- Position: Right back

Senior career*
Years	Team	Apps	(Gls)
2001–2005	Petrokimia Putra	69	(4)
2006–2007	Persita Tangerang	25	(0)
2008–2009	Deltras	17	(0)
2009–2011	Persiba Balikpapan	71	(1)
2012–2013	Persis Solo	23	(0)
- * Club domestic league appearances and goals

Dwi Joko Prihatin (born 25 February 1982) is an Indonesian former footballer.

== Club statistics ==
Club	Season	Super League		Premier Division		Piala Indonesia		Total	
Club	Season	Apps	Goals	Apps	Goals	Apps	Goals	Apps	Goals
Persiba Balikpapan	2009-10	27	0	-		4	0	31	0
Persiba Balikpapan	2010-11	24	1	-		-		24	0
Persiba Balikpapan	2011-12	20	0	-		-		20	0
Total		71	1	-		4	0	75	1
