= Pieter Rumaropen =

Indonesian footballer

Personal information
- Full name: Edison Pieter Rumaropen
- Date of birth: 13 November 1983 (age 42)
- Place of birth: Biak Numfor, Indonesia
- Height: 1.64 m (5 ft 4 1/2 in)
- Position: Attacking midfielder

Youth career
- 1998–2001: PPLP Papua
- 2001–2002: PSBS Biak

Senior career*
Years	Team	Apps	(Gls)
2002–2015	Persiwa Wamena	273	(64)
- * Club domestic league appearances and goals

Edison Pieter Rumaropen (born 13 November 1983 in Biak Numfor Regency, Papua, Indonesia) is an Indonesian former football player who last played for Persiwa Wamena. His position was striker and midfielder.

During a league match against Pelita Bandung Raya on 21 April 2013, Rumaropen assaulted the referee, punching him in the face after he had awarded a penalty against Persiwa Wamena. The official left the field, bleeding from his torn lower lip, and Rumaropen was given a red card. As a result of the assault Rumaropen was banned for life by PSSI, the Football Association of Indonesia.

Despite the life ban, Rumaropen still played for Persiwa Wamena on Premier League after getting relegated from Super League that year. He had a son, Diego Rumaropen, member of Indonesian National Police which was killed by TPNPB.
