= Julio López (footballer) =

Chilean footballer (born 1978)

Personal information
- Full name: Julio Gabriel López Venegas
- Date of birth: 4 November 1978 (age 47)
- Place of birth: Quillota, Chile
- Height: 1.76 m (5 ft 9 in)
- Position: Striker

Youth career
- Barnechea

Senior career*
Years	Team	Apps	(Gls)
1998–2000	Barnechea	–	(–)
2000–2001	San Luis	27	(5)
2001	Magallanes	0	(0)
2002	Persela Lamongan	–	(–)
2002–2003	PSIS Semarang	25	(16)
2003	Persib Bandung	17	(7)
2004	Atlante	0	(0)
2004	→ Potros Neza (loan)	20	(6)
2005	St. Gallen	13	(5)
2005	Vaduz	9	(1)
2006	Universidad de Chile	5	(0)
2006–2008	PSIS Semarang	26	(20)
2008–2009	PSM Makassar	33	(20)
2009–2010	Persiba Balikpapan	33	(13)
2010–2011	Persisam Putra Samarinda	28	(14)
2011–2012	Persijap Jepara	22	(12)
2012–2013	Persikabo Bogor	21	(11)
Total		279	(130)
- * Club domestic league appearances and goals

Julio Gabriel López Venegas (born 4 November 1978), referred as Julio López, is a Chilean former professional footballer who played as a striker for clubs in Chile, Indonesia, Mexico and Switzerland.

== Career ==
Lopez started his career in his country of birth with the clubs Barnechea, San Luis de Quillota and Magallanes. In 2002, he joined PSIS Semarang, he scored 16 goals for PSIS Semarang in a season.

On 2003 season, Lopez moved to Persib Bandung following the invitation from fellow Chilean Persib coach, Juan Páez. Lopez shone in first round together with Adrián Colombo as duet. He scored seven goals for the Persib in the first round of 2004 Liga Indonesia Premier Division. In the second half of the season, Lopez's name disappeared from the player roster Persib Bandung because of his lack of discipline factor. So, he moved to Mexico and joined Atlante, being loaned to Potros Neza in the Primera División 'A', where he coincided with the Chileans Francisco Huaiquipán and Joel Soto. After a step in Switzerland with St. Gallen and FC Vaduz, in 2006 he returned to Chile and joined Universidad de Chile in the Chilean top flight, making five appearances.

Lopez then joined PSM Makassar. Despite being a new player, then coach Raja Isa did not hesitate to give him the captain's armband to replace Syamsul Bachri Chaeruddin. At club PSM Makassar, Lopez did not take long to adapt to the environment and new friends. The proof he was able to show increased performance in every appearance with PSM Makassar.

Entering the 2009–10 season of ISL, Lopez joined in Persiba Balikpapan. He retired in 2013 playing for Persikabo Bogor, where he coincided with the Chilean Alejandro Tobar.

== Personal life ==
Lopez played in Indonesia since 2002. He had played in Mexican, Europe and Chilean Leagues since 2004 before went back to Indonesia in 2008, he decided to quit the League of Indonesia for personal reasons. While living in Indonesia, he was called "J-Lo" by fans of Persib Bandung during his spell there and he also launched a sneaker brand with his name.
