= Tegao =

Brazilian footballer

Personal information
- Full name: Anderso Ribeiro Pereira
- Date of birth: 15 April 1980 (age 46)
- Place of birth: Rio de Janeiro, Brazil
- Height: 1.84 m (6 ft 1/2 in)
- Position: Striker

Youth career
- 1993–1994: Fluminense
- 1995–1999: SC Corinthians Paulista

Senior career*
Years	Team	Apps	(Gls)
2000	São Paulo		
2001–2003	Clube Náutico		
2004	America FC		
2004	Estudiantes Santander		
2004	Botafogo		
2005	Clube Náutico		
2006	CR Vasco da Gama		
2007	Duque de Caxias		
2008	KÍ Klaksvík		
2008–2009	PSMS Medan	15	(2)
- * Club domestic league appearances and goals as of 15 May 2012

Anderso Ribeiro Pereira (born April 15, 1980), known as Tegao, is a Brazilian footballer who previously played for PSMS Medan in the Indonesia Super League.
