= Leandro Camilo =

Brazilian footballer

Personal information
- Full name: Leandro Camilo de Almeida
- Date of birth: 9 February 1986 (age 40)
- Place of birth: Diamantino, Mato Grosso, Brazil
- Height: 1.88 m (6 ft 2 in)
- Position: Centre-back

Senior career*
Years	Team	Apps	(Gls)
2007	Marília	0	(0)
2008	Ceará	0	(0)
2008–2009	Pelita Jaya	22	(0)
2009	Campinense	15	(0)
2010–2011	Paysandu	17	(0)
2011	→ São Bernardo (loan)	19	(0)
2012	Comercial	11	(0)
2012	Brasiliense	18	(0)
2013	Boa Esporte	9	(1)
2013	Rio Branco-AC	11	(0)
2014	Audax Rio	13	(2)
2014	Princesa do Solimões	9	(1)
2014	Lajeadense	17	(0)
2015–2021	Brasil de Pelotas	249	(14)
2022	Botafogo-PB	16	(2)
2023	Concórdia	0	(0)
- * Club domestic league appearances and goals as of 23 March 2023

Leandro Camilo de Almeida (born 9 February 1986) is a Brazilian footballer who plays as a centre-back.

== Trophies ==
- Campeonato Paraense Champions :
  - Paysandu Sport Club : 1 (2009–10)
