= Esaiah Pello Benson =

Liberian footballer (born 1982)

Esaiah Benson
Personal information
- Full name: Esaiah Pello Benson
- Date of birth: 27 March 1982 (age 44)
- Place of birth: Monrovia, Liberia
- Height: 1.75 m (5 ft 9 in)
- Position: Defender

Senior career*
Years	Team	Apps	(Gls)
2003	Saint Anthony	18	(6)
2004–2005	PSIS Semarang	22	(6)
2006	PSIM Yogyakarta	33	(3)
2007–2008	Persita Tangerang	31	(20)
2008	Arema Malang	15	(0)
2008–2009	Persitara North Jakarta	15	(1)
2009–2010	Persiraja Banda Aceh	17	(14)
2011	Persitara North Jakarta	12	(2)
2011–2012	Persiram Raja Ampat	16	(0)
2012–2013	Perlis	8	(2)
2013–2014	PSIR Rembang	0	(0)
2014–2015	Persitara North Jakarta	3	(0)
Total		190	(41)

International career
2003	Liberia	9	(0)
- * Club domestic league appearances and goals

Esaiah Pello Benson (born 27 March 1982) is a Liberian former footballer who played as a defender. He was a member of the Liberia national team.
