= Jules Basile Onambele =

Cameroonian footballer

Personal information
- Full name: Jules Basile Onambele
- Date of birth: 11 April 1982 (age 44)
- Place of birth: Cameroon
- Height: 1.75 m (5 ft 9 in)
- Position: Midfielder

Team information
- Current team: Persin Sinjai

Senior career*
Years	Team	Apps	(Gls)
2008–2009	PSIS Semarang	??	(3)
2009–2010	Gresik United	??	(7)
2010–2011	PSM Makassar	3	(0)
2011–2012	Persin Sinjai		
- * Club domestic league appearances and goals

Jules Basile Onambele (born 11 April 1982) is a Cameroonian former footballer who plays as a midfielder.
