= Joo Ki-hwan =

South Korean footballer

Joo Ki-Hwan
Personal information
- Full name: Joo Ki-Hwan
- Date of birth: December 20, 1981 (age 44)
- Place of birth: South Korea
- Height: 1.91 m (6 ft 3 in)
- Position: Defender

Senior career*
Years	Team	Apps	(Gls)
2008−2009	Super Reds		(2)
2010	PSM Makassar	14	(1)
2011	Geylang United	16	(1)
2012	PSPS Pekanbaru	14	(0)
- * Club domestic league appearances and goals as of 11:00, 11 July 2012 (UTC)

- Joo Ki-hwan
- Hangul: 주기환
- RR: Ju Gihwan
- MR: Chu Kihwan

Joo Ki-Hwan (Korean: 주기환; born December 20, 1981) is a South Korean former foorballer who plays as a defender.
