= Georges Nicolas Djone =

Cameroonian footballer

Nicolas Djone
Personal information
- Full name: Georges Nicolas Djone
- Date of birth: 30 January 1982 (age 44)
- Place of birth: Cameroon
- Height: 1.78 m (5 ft 10 in)
- Position: Midfielder

Senior career*
Years	Team	Apps	(Gls)
2008–2009	Persita Tangerang		
2009–2011	PPSM Sakti Magelang		
2011–2012	Persis Solo		
- * Club domestic league appearances and goals

Georges Nicolas Djone (born 30 January 1982) is a Cameroonian former professional footballer who played as a midfielder. He previously played for Persis Solo in the Liga Indonesia Premier Division (LI).
