= Muhammad Isnaini =

Indonesian footballer

Personal information
- Date of birth: 10 September 1981 (age 45)
- Place of birth: Pekanbaru, Indonesia
- Height: 1.73 m (5 ft 8 in)
- Position: Forward

Senior career*
| Years | Team | Apps | (Gls) |
| 2000–2001 | PS Karimun | 8 | (2) |
| 2001–2003 | PS Pelalawan | 17 | (6) |
| 2003–2005 | Persires Rengat | 26 | (11) |
| 2005–2006 | Riau Pos FC | 14 | (8) |
| 2006–2015 | PSPS Pekanbaru | 120 | (40) |
| 2015 | PSS Sleman | 4 | (0) |
- * Club domestic league appearances and goals as of 18 April 2019

Muhammad Isnaini (born 10 September 1981 in Pekanbaru) is an Indonesian former footballer. He is also a Police Brigadier in the Indonesian National Police.
