= Denny Rumba =

Indonesian footballer

Personal information
- Full name: Denny Rumba
- Date of birth: 16 May 1985 (age 41)
- Place of birth: Semarang, Indonesia
- Height: 1.73 m (5 ft 8 in)
- Position: Full-back

Senior career*
Years	Team	Apps	(Gls)
2005−2006	Persiba Bantul	16	(0)
2006−2011	PSIS Semarang	75	(6)
2011−2012	PSMS Medan	19	(2)
2013−2015	Madura Utama	46	(2)
2016	PSS Sleman	19	(1)
2018	PSIR Rembang	2	(0)

International career
2003–2004	Indonesia U19		
2005	Indonesia U20		
2006–2007	Indonesia U23		
- * Club domestic league appearances and goals as of 11 July 2018

Denny Rumba (born 16 May 1985) is an Indonesian former professional footballer who plays as a full-back.

== Club statistics ==
Club	Season	Super League		Premier Division		Piala Indonesia		Total	
Club	Season	Apps	Goals	Apps	Goals	Apps	Goals	Apps	Goals
PSMS Medan	2011-12	19	2	-		-		19	2
Total		19	2	-		-		19	2
