= Zada (footballer) =

Brazilian footballer

Personal information
- Full name: Leonardo Martins Dinelli
- Date of birth: 21 August 1980 (age 46)
- Place of birth: Brazil
- Height: 1.74 m (5 ft 8 1/2 in)
- Position: Midfielder

Senior career*
Years	Team	Apps	(Gls)
2001–2004	Parana Clube		
2004–2007	Academica Coimbra		
2007–2008	E.C. Rio de Janeiro		
2008–2009	PSMS Medan	32	(14)
2009–2011	Persela Lamongan	22	(10)
- * Club domestic league appearances and goals as of 21 October 2009

Leonardo Martins Dinelli or Zada (born August 21, 1977) is a Brazilian footballer that previously plays for Persela Lamongan in the 2009-10 Indonesia Super League.
