= Arnaldo Villalba =

Paraguayan footballer (born 1978)

Personal information
- Full name: Arnaldo Villalba Benítez
- Date of birth: 21 October 1978 (age 48)
- Place of birth: Ciudad del Este, Paraguay
- Height: 1.82 m (6 ft 0 in)
- Position: Forward

Senior career*
Years	Team	Apps	(Gls)
1996	Olimpia		
2000	Sol de América		
2003	Tupi		
2003–2004	PSMS Medan		
2005	Rampla Juniors		
2006	Cerro Porteño		
2007	3 de Febrero		
2007	Alianza Atlético		
2008	Persibom Bolaang Mongondow		
2008–2010	Persijap Jepara		
2010	Cobresol		
2011–2012	Barito Putera		
2012	Persis Solo		
- * Club domestic league appearances and goals

Arnaldo Villalba Benítez (born 21 October 1978) is a Paraguayan former professional footballer who played as a forward.
