= Souleymane Traore =

Guinean footballer

Personal information
- Full name: Souleymane Traore
- Date of birth: July 10, 1987
- Place of birth: Guinea
- Date of death: October 21, 2009 (aged 22)
- Place of death: Jakarta, Indonesia
- Height: 1.80 m (5 ft 11 in)
- Position: Midfielder

Senior career*
Years	Team	Apps	(Gls)
2007	PSS Sleman	??	(??)
2008–2009	Arema Malang	20	(5)
Total		??	(??)
- * Club domestic league appearances and goals as of 21 June 2009

Souleymane Traore (July 10, 1987 – October 21, 2009) was a Guinean footballer.

== Career ==
=== Mali ===
He played several years in the football competition in Mali (Malien Premiere Division) before he moved to Indonesia to play football with PSS Sleman.

=== Indonesia ===
He began his career in Indonesia in 2007 with the club PSS Sleman. In the 2008–2009 season he joined the team of Arema Malang by contributing 5 goals from 20 games.

He ended his contract with Arema on the basis of his health before he died.

== Personal life ==
Traore was born in Guinea.

After two months of illness, he died on October 21, 2009, at the house in Bintaro, South Jakarta of his friend Alseny Diawara (ex-Persema Malang).
