= Abdelaziz Dnibi =

Moroccan footballer

Personal information
- Full name: Abdelaziz Dnibi
- Date of birth: 13 January 1975 (age 51)
- Place of birth: Beni Mellal, Morocco
- Height: 1.85 m (6 ft 1 in)
- Position: Midfielder

Senior career*
Years	Team	Apps	(Gls)
1991–1996	Olympique Khouribga		
1996	Al Ahly SC		
1996–1997	Palermo	2	
1997–2000	FC Baden	33	
2000–2002	FC Solothurn	16	
2002–2003	Raja Beni Mellal		
2003–2004	HFC Haarlem	5	(0)
2007–2008	Geylang United		
2008–2009	PSIS Semarang	15	(1)
2009–2010	Persikab Bandung	18	(1)

International career
–1996	Marocco U-21		

Managerial career
- 2012–2013: Union Azilal
- 2013–2015: JS Kasba Tadla (Assistant)
- 2015–2017: Raja Beni Mellal (Assistant)
- 2017–2018: Raja Beni Mellal
- 2018: Hilal Tarrast
- 2018–2019: Chabab Tata
- 2018–2019: Mouloudia Assa
- 2022–2023: CIS Marrakech
- 2023–2024: COD Meknes
- 2025–2026: COD Meknes
- * Club domestic league appearances and goals

Abdelaziz Dnibi (Arabic: عبد العزيز الذنيبي; born 13 January 1975) is a former Moroccan footballer who previously played for Persikab Bandung in the Liga Indonesia Premier Division.
