= O.K. John =

Nigerian footballer

Personal information
- Full name: Onorionde Kughegbe John
- Date of birth: July 22, 1983 (age 43)
- Place of birth: Lagos, Nigeria
- Height: 1.83 m (6 ft 0 in)
- Position: Centre back

Senior career*
Years	Team	Apps	(Gls)
2005–2006	Persidafon Dafonsoro	22	(3)
2006–2007	Gresik United	24	(4)
2007−2009	Persiwa Wamena	67	(5)
2009−2010	Persik Kediri	26	(1)
2010−2013	Persiwa Wamena	55	(1)
2013–2014	Persebaya (DU)	24	(2)
2015	PDRM	5	(0)
2015	Mitra Kukar	25	(0)
2015–2016	Persija Jakarta	7	(0)
2017	UiTM	16	(0)
2018–2019	Madura United	8	(0)
2018	→ Persebaya Surabaya (loan)	12	(1)
2019	Kalteng Putra	28	(0)
2020	Barito Putera	2	(0)
2020	PSMS Medan	0	(0)
2021	Persik Kediri	6	(0)
2022–2023	RANS Nusantara	11	(1)
Total		338	(18)
- * Club domestic league appearances and goals as of 20:57, 13 December 2022 (UTC)

Onorionde Kughegbe John (born July 22, 1983), commonly known as O.K. John, is a Nigerian former footballer who plays as a central defender.

== Club career ==
=== Madura United ===
In February 2018, he signed a one-year contract with Liga 1 club Madura United. John made his league debut on 26 March 2018 in a match against Barito Putera at the Gelora Ratu Pamelingan Stadium, Pamekasan.

==== Persebaya Surabaya (loan) ====
In July 2018, he joined Liga 1 side Persebaya Surabaya on loan from Madura United. John made his league debut on 18 July 2018 in a match against PSMS Medan. John scored his first goal for Persebaya against Sriwijaya in the 20th minute at the Gelora Sriwijaya Stadium, Palembang.

=== Kalteng Putra ===
He was signed for Kalteng Putra to play in Liga 1 in the 2019 season. John made his league debut on 16 May 2019 in a match against PSIS Semarang at the Moch. Soebroto Stadium, Magelang. John made 28 league appearances and did not score a goal for Kalteng Putra.

=== Barito Putera ===
In 2020, O.K. John signed a contract with Indonesian Liga 1 club Barito Putera. He made his league debut on 29 February 2020 in a match against Madura United at the Gelora Ratu Pamelingan Stadium, Pamekasan. John made 2 league appearances and did not score a goal for Barito Putera.

=== PSMS Medan ===
He was signed for PSMS Medan to play in the Liga 2 in the 2020 season. This season was suspended on 27 March 2020 due to the COVID-19 pandemic. The season was abandoned and was declared void on 20 January 2021.

=== Persik Kediri ===
In 2021, O.K. John signed a contract with Indonesian club Persik Kediri to play in Liga 1 in the 2021 season. He made his league debut on 27 August 2021, in a 1–0 loss against Bali United at the Gelora Bung Karno Stadium, Jakarta. John made 6 league appearances and did not score a goal for Persik Kediri.

=== RANS Nusantara ===
O.K. John signed for RANS Nusantara to play in the 2022–23 Liga 1 season. He made his league debut on 23 July 2022 in a match against PSIS Semarang at the Jatidiri Stadium, Semarang.

== Personal life ==
In 2018, John was naturalised as an Indonesian citizen, allowing him to register as an Indonesian national in Liga 1.
