= Tiago Gaúcho =

Brazilian footballer

Personal information
- Full name: Tiago Roberto Stragliotto
- Date of birth: 16 August 1984 (age 42)
- Place of birth: Ijuí, Brazil
- Height: 1.80 m (5 ft 11 in)
- Position: Midfielder

Team information
- Current team: Pelotas

Senior career*
Years	Team	Apps	(Gls)
2007	Bonsucesso		
2008	Ceará		
2008–2009	Pelita Jaya	??	(0)
2010	Vila Nova	2	(0)
2010	Gama	4	(0)
2011	América	3	(1)
2011	Ipatinga	8	(0)
2012	ASA	4	(0)
2012–	Pelotas		
- * Club domestic league appearances and goals as of 18 May 2013

Tiago Roberto Stragliotto (born August 16, 1984 in Ijuí), known as Tiago Gaúcho, is a Brazilian footballer who currently plays for Pelotas.
