= Boakay Foday =

Liberian footballer

Boakay Eddie Foday
Personal information
- Full name: Boakay Eddie Foday
- Date of birth: 25 May 1986 (age 40)
- Place of birth: Monrovia, Liberia
- Height: 1.85 m (6 ft 1 in)
- Position: Striker

Senior career*
Years	Team	Apps	(Gls)
2004–2005	Karn United	12	(13)
2005–2012	Persiwa Wamena	175	(178)
2012–2014	Sriwijaya	40	(38)
2014–2015	Persija Jakarta	20	(0)
2015–2016	Yadanarbon	18	(22)
2016–2017	Persipura Jayapura	68	(53)
2018–2019	PS Mojokerto Putra	0	(0)
Total		333	(304)

International career
2007–2014	Liberia	11	(0)
- * Club domestic league appearances and goals

Boakay Eddie Foday (born 25 May 1986) is a Liberian former professional footballer who played as a striker.

== Clubs career ==
Boakay was born in Monrovia, Liberia.

=== Persiwa Wamena ===
Boakay joined Persiwa Wamena in 2005. In the 2009–10 season he became the club's captain. Boakay played in 173 games and scored 77 goals with this club. He left the club in 2012 to join Sriwijaya.

=== Sriwijaya ===
On 28 November 2012, Boakay signed a contract with Sriwijaya.

=== Persipura ===
Later in January 2014, he signed a contract with Persipura Jayapura and said it was his dream come true to play with them.

=== Yadanarbon FC ===
On 19 November 2014, Boakay transferred to Yadanarbon FC, which will participate in the 2015 AFC Champions League play-offs for their first time. He signed for the Myanmar National League (MNL) Champion with a one-year contract.

== International career ==
He has also a member of the Liberia national football team.

== Honors ==
=== Club honors ===
Sriwijaya

- Indonesian Inter Island Cup: 2012
