= Diva Tarkas =

Indonesian footballer

Personal information
- Full name: Diva Tarkas
- Date of birth: 30 November 1987 (age 38)
- Place of birth: Maros, Indonesia
- Height: 1.68 m (5 ft 6 in)
- Position: Midfielder

Senior career*
Years	Team	Apps	(Gls)
2006–2011	PSM Makassar	37	(2)
2011–2012	Persijap Jepara	22	(1)
2012–2013	Persis Solo	30	(0)
2014–2015	Deltras	22	(0)
2017	PS Sumbawa Barat	19	(0)
- * Club domestic league appearances and goals

Diva Tarkas (born 30 November 1987) is an Indonesian former footballer who plays as a midfielder.
