= Salomon Bengondo =

Cameroonian footballer

Personal information
- Full name: Rigobert Salomon Guy Bengondo
- Date of birth: 8 August 1987
- Place of birth: Yaoundé, Cameroon
- Date of death: 29 November 2013 (aged 26)
- Place of death: Tangerang, Banten, Indonesia
- Height: 1.83 m (6 ft 0 in)
- Position: Striker

Senior career*
Years	Team	Apps	(Gls)
2008	PSIS Semarang	??	(3)
2009	Persih Tembilahan	??	(2)
2009–2010	Persikota Tangerang	??	(1)
2011–2013	Persipro Probolinggo		
- * Club domestic league appearances and goals

Rigobert Salomon Guy Bengondo (8 August 1987 – 29 November 2013) was a Cameroonian footballer that played for Persipro Probolinggo in the Liga Indonesia Premier Division (LPIS). He previously played for Persikota Tangerang in the 2009-10 Liga Indonesia Premier Division.

He died on 29 November 2013 in Tangerang, Banten, Indonesia.
