= Samsul Arif =

Indonesian professional footballer

Personal information
- Full name: Samsul Arif Munip
- Date of birth: 14 January 1985 (age 41)
- Place of birth: Bojonegoro, Indonesia
- Height: 1.66 m (5 ft 5 in)
- Position: Forward

Team information
- Current team: Persibo Bojonegoro
- Number: 9

Senior career*
Years	Team	Apps	(Gls)
2004–2005	Persikaba Blora	22	(8)
2005–2009	Persibo Bojonegoro	60	(22)
2009–2010	Persela Lamongan	32	(9)
2010–2012	Persibo Bojonegoro	37	(16)
2012–2013	Persela Lamongan	32	(13)
2013–2015	Arema Cronus	27	(17)
2015–2016	Persib Bandung	24	(2)
2016–2017	Persela Lamongan	34	(17)
2018–2019	Barito Putera	67	(19)
2020–2021	Persita Tangerang	3	(0)
2021–2022	Persebaya Surabaya	26	(11)
2022–2023	Persis Solo	29	(4)
2023–2024	Gresik United	18	(4)
2024–2025	Persela Lamongan	13	(2)
2025–	Persibo Bojonegoro	7	(0)

International career
2005–2006	Indonesia U21		
2006–2007	Indonesia U23		
2011–2014	Indonesia	23	(4)
- * Club domestic league appearances and goals as of 11 January 2026

Samsul Arif Munip (born 14 January 1985) is an Indonesian professional footballer who plays as a forward for Liga Nusantara club Persibo Bojonegoro.

== International career ==
He made his debut for Indonesia national football team in 2014 FIFA World Cup qualification against Iran on 15 November 2011 and gave one assist in the match.

== Career statistics ==
=== International ===
As of match played 25 November 2014

Appearances and goals by national team and year
National team	Year	Apps	Goals
Indonesia	2011	1	0
Indonesia	2012	9	0
Indonesia	2013	3	0
Indonesia	2014	9	4
Total		23	4

=== International goals ===
Samsul Arif: International goals
No.	Date	Venue	Opponent	Score	Result	Competition
1	25 June 2014	Gajayana Stadium, Malang, Indonesia	Nepal	1–0	2–0	Friendly
2	14 September 2014	Gelora Delta Stadium, Sidoarjo, Indonesia	Malaysia	2–0	2–0	Friendly
3	11 November 2014	Gelora Bung Karno Stadium, Jakarta, Indonesia	Timor-Leste	4–0	4–0	Friendly
4	22 November 2014	Mỹ Đình National Stadium, Hanoi, Vietnam	Vietnam	2–2	2–2	2014 AFF Suzuki Cup

== Honours ==
=== Club ===
Persibo Bojonegoro

- Liga Indonesia First Division: 2007
- Piala Indonesia: 2012

Arema Cronus

- East Java Governor Cup: 2013
- Indonesian Inter Island Cup: 2014/15

=== Individual ===
- Copa Indonesia Top Goalscorer: 2008–09 (shared with Pablo Francés)
- Liga 1 Player of the Month: February 2022
- Liga 1 Team of the Season: 2021–22
