= Claudio Pronetto =

Argentine footballer

Personal information
- Full name: Claudio Damian Pronetto
- Date of birth: 27 August 1980 (age 46)
- Place of birth: Río Primero, Córdoba, Argentina
- Height: 1.77 m (5 ft 10 in)
- Position: Midfielder

Youth career
- 1990−1999: Talleres de Córdoba

Senior career*
Years	Team	Apps	(Gls)
2000−2004	Talleres de Córdoba	15	(1)
2004−2005	Tigre	12	(1)
2005–2006	Sarmiento de Junín	8	(1)
2006–2007	Deportivo Italia	12	(2)
2007–2008	Racing de Córdoba	16	(5)
2008−2009	Deltras Sidoarjo	35	(14)
2009−2010	PSM Makassar	32	(10)
2011–2012	Gresik United	12	(2)
- * Club domestic league appearances and goals as of 12:10, 11 July 2012

Claudio Damian Pronetto (born August 27, 1980) is an Argentine football midfielder who last played in Gresik United. He previously played in the Argentine Primera División for Talleres de Córdoba.
