= Edson Hoces =

Chilean footballer (born 1976)

Personal information
- Full name: Edson Leonardo Hoces Pereira
- Date of birth: 3 July 1976 (age 50)
- Place of birth: Chile
- Height: 1.80 m (5 ft 11 in)
- Position: Defender

Senior career*
Years	Team	Apps	(Gls)
2005	Thép Pomina Tien Giang		
2006	Persikabo Bogor		
2007	Persiku Kudus		
2008–2009	PSIS Semarang	?	(1)
2012–2013	Deportes Melipilla	29	(1)
- * Club domestic league appearances and goals

Edson Leonardo Hoces Pereira (born 3 July 1976) is a Chilean former footballer who played as a defender.

== Biography ==
Hoces played for the Indonesian clubs TIRA-Persikabo, Persiku Kudus and PSIS Semarang before returning to his country of birth, Chile, to play for Deportes Melipilla.

In 2014, he helped the Indonesia Team in the Homeless World Cup in Santiago, Chile.

== Personal life ==
Since 2011, he manages a company focused in lodging and food services.
