= Henry Makinwa =

Nigerian footballer (born 1977)

Personal information
- Full name: Henry Olufosoye Makinwa
- Date of birth: 6 November 1977 (age 48)
- Place of birth: Lagos, Nigeria
- Height: 1.81 m (5 ft 11 1/2 in)
- Position: Forward

Senior career*
Years	Team	Apps	(Gls)
1995	Iwuanyanwu Nationale		
1996	Concord		
1997	Udoji United	20	(22)
1997	Rayo Vallecano	0	(0)
1998	Penafiel	6	(0)
1998–2001	Vitoria Setúbal	73	(11)
2001–2002	Gil Vicente	11	(0)
2002–2003	Farense	18	(4)
2003	Rapid București	11	(2)
2004	Feirense	8	(1)
2005	Al-Ahly	7	(1)
2005–2006	AEP	9	(4)
2007	Maccabi Petah Tikva	3	(0)
2007	Tianjin Teda	12	(1)
2007–2008	Gretna	13	(0)
2009–2010	PSMS Medan	8	(2)
- Vittoriosa Stars
Total		209	(52)

Managerial career
- 2018–2019: Abia Warriors
- 2019: Katsina United
- * Club domestic league appearances and goals

Henry Olufosoye Makinwa (born 6 November 1977) is a Nigerian former footballer who played as a forward.

A journeyman, he represented 17 clubs in 11 countries during his professional career.

== Club career ==
=== Early years / Portugal ===
After playing for three teams in his homeland, Makinwa moved abroad at the age of 19, his first stop being Rayo Vallecano in the Spanish second division. In the following transfer window, without having appeared officially for the club, he signed for F.C. Penafiel in Portugal, in the same level.

Makinwa (known in Portugal as Maki) spent the following four-and-a-half seasons in the country, mostly for Vitória de Setúbal. In the 2000–01 campaign he scored a career-best – in Europe – eight goals in 28 games, as the Sadinos returned to the Primeira Liga immediately after being relegated; in late February 2003, he left S.C. Farense and switched to Romania with FC Rapid București.

=== Gretna ===
Over the course of the following four seasons, Makinwa never settled with a team, playing in Egypt, Portugal, Cyprus, Israel and China. On 8 November 2007, he signed for newly promoted Scottish Premier League side Gretna on a free transfer, following his release from Chinese Super League's Tianjin Teda FC.

Makinwa made his competitive debut on 25 November 2007 against Hearts, playing the full 90 minutes in a 1–1 home draw, with Laryea Kingston scoring at both ends. He failed to score any goal in 14 official appearances and, after Gretna's relegation and dissolve, found himself again a free agent.

=== Late career ===
In October 2009, after spending one year in Indonesia, Makinwa joined Maltese First Division team Vittoriosa Stars F.C. on a free transfer.

== Honours ==
Rapid București

- Liga I: 2002–03
- Supercupa României: 2003

Al Ahly

- Egyptian Premier League: 2004–05
