= Ardan Aras =

Indonesian footballer

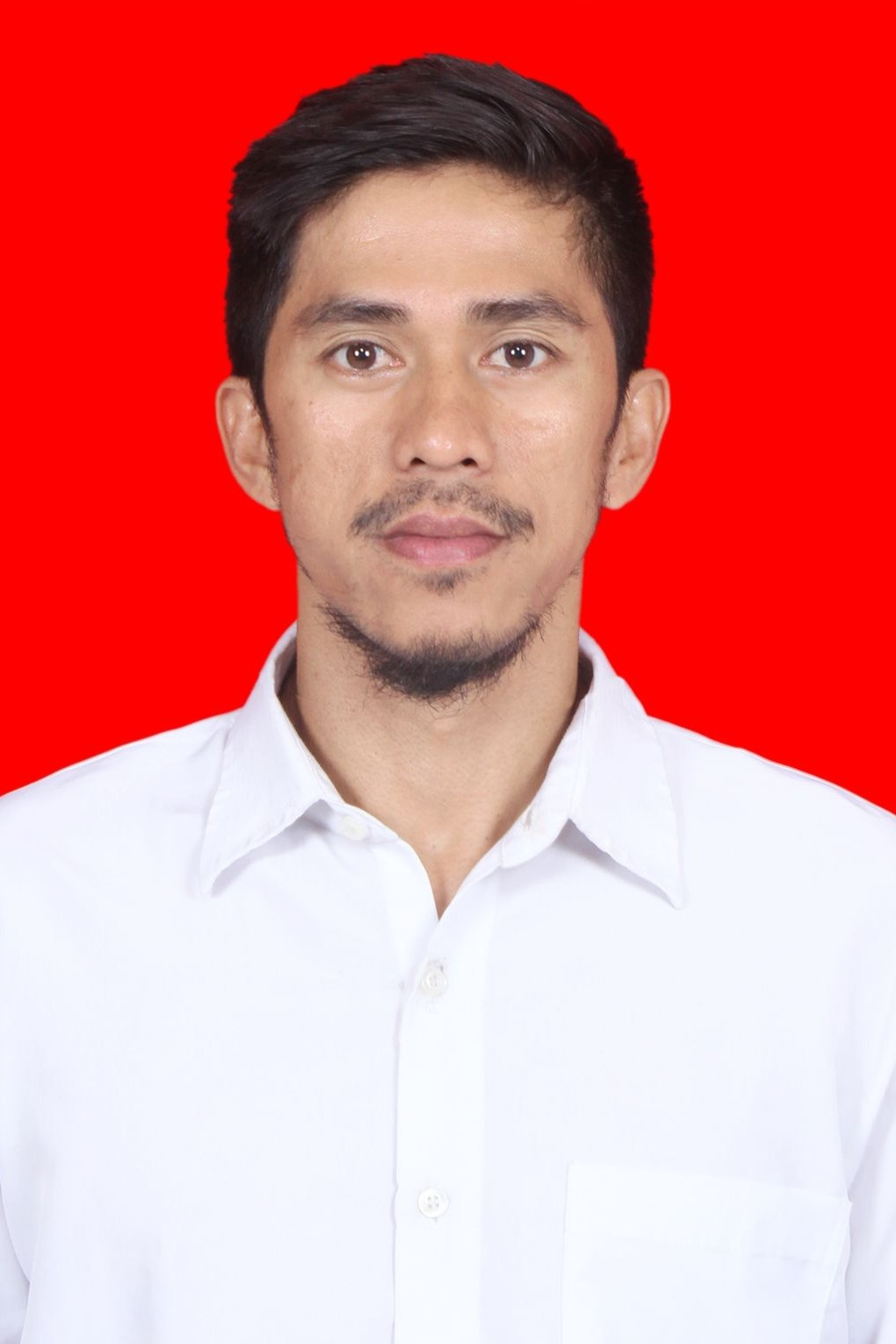

Personal information
- Full name: Ardan Aras
- Date of birth: 2 March 1984 (age 42)
- Place of birth: Polewali Mandar, Indonesia
- Height: 1.76 m (5 ft 9 in)
- Positions: Defender; defensive midfielder

Youth career
- 2002: Persim Maros
- 2003–2004: PS Sandeg Polman

Senior career*
Years	Team	Apps	(Gls)
2004–2006	PSM Makassar	18	(1)
2007–2011	Pelita Jaya	106	(3)
2011–2012	Mitra Kukar	27	(0)
2013–2014	Barito Putera	2	(0)
2014–2018	PSM Makassar	63	(4)
2019	Martapura	14	(2)
2019	PSS Sleman	2	(0)
2020	Badak Lampung	0	(0)
2021–2022	Persijap Jepara	9	(0)
Total		241	(10)

International career
2006–2007	Indonesia U23		(1)
2007	Indonesia	2	(0)
- * Club domestic league appearances and goals

Ardan Aras (born in Polewali Mandar Regency, West Sulawesi, 2 March 1984) is an Indonesian politician and former professional footballer who plays as a central defender or left back, but can be deployed as a defensive midfielder as well.

== International career ==
Ardan has been a regular for Indonesia U-23 Team since 2006, participating in a national training at The Hague, Netherlands. He has participated in Asian Games Qatar in 2006 and SEA Games Thailand in 2007, where he scored a free-kick in a 3–1 defeat of Cambodia.

=== International goals ===
International under-23 goals

Goal	Date	Venue	Opponent	Score	Result	Competition
1	2 December 2007	80th Birthday Stadium, Nakhon Ratchasima, Thailand	Cambodia	3–1	3–1	2007 SEA Games

== Later career ==
After retiring from football, Ardan was elected into the municipal legislature of Polewali Mandar from the National Mandate Party in the 2024 election.
