= Ahmad Sembiring =

Indonesian footballer

Personal information
- Full name: Ahmad Sembiring Usman
- Date of birth: March 12, 1985 (age 41)
- Place of birth: Ternate, Indonesia
- Height: 1.78 m (5 ft 10 in)
- Position: Midfielder

Senior career*
| Years | Team | Apps | (Gls) |
| 2004–2005 | Persiter Ternate | 11 | (1) |
| 2005–2006 | Persipur Purwodadi | 12 | (2) |
| 2006–2008 | Persiter Ternate | 27 | (1) |
| 2008–2009 | Arema Malang | 24 | (2) |
| 2009–2011 | Persisam Putra Samarinda | 58 | (10) |
| 2011–2012 | Persiba Balikpapan | 30 | (4) |
| 2012–2013 | Gresik United | 26 | (2) |
| 2013–2014 | Persiba Balikpapan | 18 | (1) |
| 2015–2016 | PSS Sleman | 13 | (0) |
| 2017–2018 | Gresik United | 10 | (1) |
- * Club domestic league appearances and goals as of 5 November 2017

Ahmad Sembiring Usman (born 12 March 1985) is an Indonesian former footballer who plays as a midfielder.
