= Robert Gaspar =

Australian soccer player

Robbie Gašpar
Personal information
- Full name: Robert Mark Gašpar
- Date of birth: 7 February 1981 (age 45)
- Place of birth: Perth, Australia
- Height: 1.84 m (6 ft 0 in)
- Position: Midfielder

Youth career
- 1996–1998: HNK Hajduk Split

Senior career*
Years	Team	Apps	(Gls)
1998	HNK Hajduk Split	0	(0)
1999	Cockburn City		
2000	Sydney Olympic	0	(0)
2001–2002	Perth SC		
2002	QAF FC		
2003–2004	Sabah		(12)
2004	QAF FC		
2005–2006	Persita Tangerang	15	(2)
2006–2009	Persiba Balikpapan	51	(5)
2009–2011	Persema Malang	40	(7)
2011–2012	Persib Bandung	20	(0)
2012–2013	Inglewood United		
2014–2016	Floreat Athena		
- * Club domestic league appearances and goals

Robert Mark Gašpar (born 7 February 1981), also known as Robbie Gaspar, is an Australian former soccer player.

An attacking midfielder, Gaspar is a former player of Malaysian side Sabah FA where he played for two seasons and appeared in the final of the 2003 Malaysia Cup. He spent two years with the youth team of HNK Hajduk Split but failed to make a first team appearance for the Croatian giants.

== Honours ==
=== Club honors ===
Perth SC

- Football West State League Premier Division (1): 2002
