= Evaldo Silva =

Brazilian footballer and manager (born 1974)

Personal information
- Full name: Evaldo Silva De Assis
- Date of birth: 17 August 1974 (age 52)
- Place of birth: Barra Mansa, Brazil
- Height: 1.85 m (6 ft 1 in)
- Position: Defender

Senior career*
Years	Team	Apps	(Gls)
1992–2004	Volta Redonda		
2004–2011	Persijap Jepara	120	(18)
2011–2012	Volta Redonda		
2012–2014	Persijap Jepara	42	(4)

Managerial career
- 2013–2014: Persijap Jepara (assistant)
- 2014–2015: Persijap Jepara (player - coach)
- * Club domestic league appearances and goals

Evaldo Silva De Assis (born 17 August 1974) is a Brazilian footballer. He is one of the main footballers who has played for five years in the league with only one club.

== Career ==
Only two clubs have ever he defended during his professional career that is Volta Redonda and Persijap Jepara.

He has played for 13 seasons (1992–2004 and 2011–2012) with Volta Redonda. And he has played for nine seasons (2004–2011 and 2012–present) with Persijap Jepara and became the longest foreign players at the club.

On 29 April 2014, he was appointed as caretaker coach Persijap replace Raja Isa.
