= Redouane Barkaoui =

Moroccan footballer

Personal information
- Full name: Redouane Barkaoui
- Date of birth: April 4, 1979 (age 47)
- Place of birth: Casablanca, Morocco
- Height: 1.80 m (5 ft 11 in)
- Position: Striker

Senior career*
| Years | Team | Apps | (Gls) |
| 2001 | Raja Casablanca | | |
| 2002 | Bahrain Riffa Club | | |
| 2003 | Al-Hilal Omdurman | | |
| 2004 | Olympique Béja | | |
| 2005 | Melaka TMFC | | |
| 2006–2008 | Persib Bandung | 55 | (15) |
| 2008 | Pahang FA | 12 | (22) |
| 2009 | Persiwa Wamena | 18 | (10) |
| 2009–2010 | Pelita Jaya FC | 16 | (13) |
| 2010–2011 | Persela Lamongan | 21 | (8) |
| 2011–2013 | Wydad de Fes | 38 | (32) |
- * Club domestic league appearances and goals

Redouane Barkaoui (born 4 April 1979) is a Moroccan former footballer who plays as a striker.

== Club career ==
=== Pelita Jaya ===
Pelita Jaya are delighted to welcome Redouane Barkaoui to the Club where he will help them to challenge for the remainder of the 2009/10 season. Redouane Barkaoui helped Pelita Jaya defend in the Indonesian Super League after win play-off position.

=== Persela Lamongan ===
On 5 September 2010, Redouane Barkaoui signed a year contract with Indonesian Super League club Persela.

=== Widad Fes ===
Redouane officially joined the Botola League, signing contract with the club Widad Fes.
