= Junior (footballer, born 1981) =

Brazilian footballer

Personal information
- Full name: Edésio Sérgio Ribeiro de Oliveira Junior
- Date of birth: 5 October 1981 (age 45)
- Place of birth: Brazil
- Height: 1.79 m (5 ft 10 1/2 in)
- Position: Midfielder

Senior career*
Years	Team	Apps	(Gls)
- Itabaiana
- Botafogo S.P.
- Volta Redonda
- C.A. Joseense
2005–2006	Persela Lamongan	22	(4)
2007–2008	PSIR Rembang	18	(6)
2008–2009	Deltras	23	(8)
2009–2010	Persijap Jepara	18	(3)
2010–2012	Hantharwady United	24	(0)
2013–2014	Kanbawza FC	16	(0)
2015	C.A. Joseense	9	(0)
- * Club domestic league appearances and goals

Edésio Sérgio Ribeiro de Oliveira Junior, or simply Junior, (born on 5 October 1981) is a Brazilian former footballer who plays as a midfielder.
