= Patricio Jiménez =

Chilean footballer (born 1976)

Patricio Jimenez Diaz
Personal information
- Full name: Patricio Antonio Jiménez Díaz
- Date of birth: 23 June 1976 (age 50)
- Place of birth: Villa Alegre, Chile
- Height: 1.80 m (5 ft 11 in)
- Position: Defender

Youth career
- Rangers

Senior career*
Years	Team	Apps	(Gls)
- Rangers
- Deportes Linares
- Malleco Unido
- Constitución Unido
- Provincial Osorno
2004–2005	Semen Padang		
2005–2006	Sriwijaya		
2006–2007	Persib Bandung		
2008	PSMS Medan	14	(2)
2009	Persisam Putra	17	(2)
2009–2010	Bontang FC	18	(0)
2010–2011	PSIS Semarang	20	(1)
2011–2012	Persitara North Jakarta	15	(4)
2012–2013	Persip Pekalongan	21	(1)
2014	Persikad Depok	11	(0)
- * Club domestic league appearances and goals

Patricio Antonio Jiménez Díaz (born 23 June 1976), referred as Patricio Jimenez Diaz, is a Chilean former professional footballer who played as a defender.

== Biography ==
Born in Villa Alegre, Chile, he played for ten different Indonesian clubs since 2004. At the end of 2012, it was said he had received an offer from Spanish club Zaragoza, but he continued playing in the archipelago.

He married the runner-up of Miss Indonesia 2003 with whom he has four children.

Following his playing career, he began a managerial career in Indonesia.

== Honours ==
Persisam Putra

- Liga Indonesia Premier Division: 2008–09
