= Paitoon Tiepma =

Thai footballer (born 1981)

Paitoon Tiebma
Personal information
- Full name: Paitoon Tiebma
- Date of birth: 13 September 1981 (age 45)
- Place of birth: Lopburi, Thailand
- Height: 1.74 m (5 ft 8 1/2 in)
- Positions: Right back; right winger

Youth career
- 1996–1998: Debsirin School

Senior career*
Years	Team	Apps	(Gls)
1999–2006	Osotsapa	61	(15)
2009–2010	Persijap Jepara	55	(3)
2010	→ Osotsapa (loan)	32	(3)
2011	Muangthong United	6	(0)
2012–2013	Osotsapa	40	(0)
2014	PTT Rayong	31	(0)
2015	Osotspa Samut Prakan	10	(0)
2016	Nakhon Pathom United	19	(0)
2016	Phrae United	12	(0)
2017	Kopoon Warrior	15	(0)
Total		281	(21)

International career
2002–2004	Thailand	8	(0)
- * Club domestic league appearances and goals

Paitoon Tiebma (Thai: ไพทูรย์ เทียบมา, born 13 September 1981) is a retired professional footballer from Thailand.

== International career ==
Paitoon was called up to the national team, in coach Peter Withe first squad selection for the 2002 Asian Games, 2002 Tiger Cup winners and squad selection for the 2004 Asian Cup.

== Honours ==
=== Club ===
Osotsapa F.C

- Kor Royal Cup Winners (1) : 2002

=== International ===
Thailand

- ASEAN Football Championship Winners (1) : 2002
