= Pablo Francés =

Argentine footballer

Personal information
- Full name: Pablo Alejandro Francés
- Date of birth: 29 September 1982 (age 44)
- Place of birth: Cordoba, Argentina
- Height: 1.73 m (5 ft 8 in)
- Position: Striker

Senior career*
Years	Team	Apps	(Gls)
2006	Atlético Chascomús		
2006	Club Destroyers		
2007	Oriente Petrolero	17	(3)
2008–2010	Persijap Jepara	50	(20)
2010–2011	Persib Bandung	13	(2)
2011	→ Persikab Bandung (loan)	9	(4)
2012	San Marcos de Arica	32	(12)
2013	Central Norte		
2013–2014	General Rojo	0	(0)
2014–2015	San Martín de Mendoza		
- * Club domestic league appearances and goals

Pablo Alejandro Francés (born 29 September 1982) is an Argentine former footballer.

== Honours ==
Individual

- Copa Indonesia Top Goalscorer: 2008–09 (shared with Samsul Arif)
