= Carlos Eduardo (footballer, born 1980) =

Brazilian footballer

Personal information
- Full name: Carlos Eduardo Bizarro Kokinho
- Date of birth: 9 January 1980 (age 46)
- Place of birth: Brazil
- Height: 1.86 m (6 ft 1 in)
- Position: Defender

Senior career*
Years	Team	Apps	(Gls)
2001	Brasiliense		
2002	America		
2003	Volta Redonda		
2004	Partizani Tirana		
2005	Remo		
2006	Wuhan Guanggu		
2007	Duque de Caxias		
2008	Ceará		
2008–2010	Pelita Jaya	32	(3)
2010–2011	Persibo Bojonegoro	18	(2)
2011–2015	Persiba Bantul	62	(5)
- * Club domestic league appearances and goals

Carlos Eduardo Bizzaro (born 9 January 1980), known as just Carlos Eduardo, is a Brazilian former footballer.
