= Danilo Fernando =

Brazilian footballer and manager (born 1979)

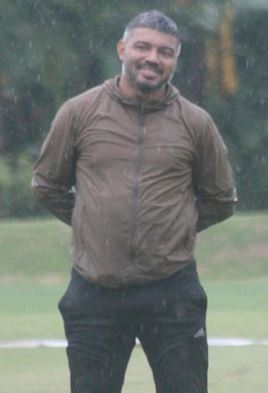

Personal information
- Full name: Danilo Fernando Bueno de Almeida
- Date of birth: 8 June 1979 (age 47)
- Place of birth: Rio de Janeiro, Brazil
- Height: 1.78 m (5 ft 10 in)
- Position: Attacking midfielder

Team information
- Current team: Kendal Tornado (technical director)

Senior career*
| Years | Team | Apps | (Gls) |
| 1997–1998 | Fortuna Sittard | 16 | (2) |
| 1998–1999 | Rio Claro | 20 | (0) |
| 2000 | Monte Azul | 25 | (8) |
| 2001 | Joseense | 25 | (15) |
| 2002 | São José | 24 | (6) |
| 2003 | Petrokimia Putra | 34 | (16) |
| 2003–2005 | Persebaya Surabaya | 50 | (22) |
| 2006–2008 | Persik Kediri | 74 | (38) |
| 2009 | Deltras Sidoarjo | 17 | (8) |
| 2009–2010 | Persisam Putra Samarinda | 30 | (8) |
| 2010–2013 | Deltras Sidoarjo | 60 | (28) |
| 2014 | Pusamania Borneo | 26 | (11) |
| Total | | 401 | (162) |

Managerial career
- 2014–2015: Pusamania Borneo (technical director)
- 2018–2020: PSS Sleman (assistant)
- 2020–2021: PSS Sleman (team manager)
- 2021–2023: Persik Kediri (technical director)
- 2024–: Kendal Tornado (technical director)
- * Club domestic league appearances and goals

Danilo Fernando Bueno de Almeida (born 8 June 1979), known simply as Danilo Fernando, is a Brazilian football coach and former player who is the technical director of Championship club Kendal Tornado.

A former attacking midfielder, he was a mainstay for Persik Kediri and also played for Indonesian clubs Petrokimia Putra, Persebaya Surabaya, Deltras Sidoarjo, Persisam Putra Samarinda and Pusamania Borneo.

== Honours ==
Persebaya Surabaya

- Liga Indonesia Premier Division: 2004
- Liga Indonesia First Division: 2003

Persik Kediri

- Liga Indonesia Premier Division: 2006
