= Armand Bassoken =

Cameroonian footballer (1983–2023)

Personal information
- Full name: Armand Joel Banaken Bassoken
- Date of birth: 26 November 1983
- Place of birth: Cameroon
- Date of death: 3 January 2023 (aged 39)
- Place of death: Indonesia
- Height: 1.90 m (6 ft 3 in)
- Position: Centre-back

Senior career*
Years	Team	Apps	(Gls)
2007	Union Douala		
2008	Les Astres		
2008–2009	Persewangi Banyuwangi	80	(2)
2009–2010	Persitara North Jakarta	26	(1)
2010–2011	PSPS Pekanbaru	30	(7)
2011–2012	Persijap Jepara	32	(5)
2013	Semen Padang	10	(0)
2014–2015	Perseta Tulungagung	13	(0)
- * Club domestic league appearances and goals

Armand Joel Banaken Bassoken (26 November 1983 – 3 January 2023) was a Cameroonian former footballer.

On 3 January 2023, he died in a motorcycle collision, at the age of 39.
