= Roberto Acosta =

Paraguayan footballer (born 1984)

Personal information
- Full name: Roberto Carlos Acosta Coronel
- Date of birth: 12 July 1984 (age 42)
- Height: 1.79 m (5 ft 10 in)
- Position: Goalkeeper

Team information
- Current team: Sol de América
- Number: 1

Youth career
- 2001–2004: Libertad

Senior career*
Years	Team	Apps	(Gls)
2004–	Libertad	5	(0)
2008–	Tacuary	22	(1)
2012–	Sol de América	80	(0)
- * Club domestic league appearances and goals as of 2 May 2014 ‡ National team caps and goals as of 2 May 2014

Roberto Carlos Acosta Coronel (born 12 July 1984) is a Paraguay international footballer who plays for Sol de América, as a goalkeeper.

== Career ==
Acosta has played club football for Libertad, Tacuary and Sol de América.

== International career ==
He was called to be international with Paraguay in 2013.
