= Anderson da Silva (footballer, born 1975) =

Brazilian footballer

Personal information
- Full name: Anderson da Silva
- Date of birth: May 12, 1975 (age 51)
- Place of birth: Volta Redonda, Rio de Janeiro, Brazil
- Height: 1.85 m (6 ft 1 in)
- Position: Defender

Youth career
- 1985–1992: Volta Redonda

Senior career*
Years	Team	Apps	(Gls)
1993–1998	Volta Redonda		
1999	EC Siderantin		
2001	CFZ do Rio		
2002–2007	PSS Sleman	37	(8)
2008–2010	Persebaya Surabaya	45	(6)
2010–2011	Mitra Kukar	27	(0)
2011–2012	Persik Kediri	31	(0)
2012–2013	Mitra Kukar	28	(1)
2014	Madiun Putra	20	(0)
- * Club domestic league appearances and goals as of 04:11, 7 April 2014 (UTC)

Anderson Da Silva (born May 12, 1975) is a Brazilian former footballer who plays as a defender.

== Career in Indonesia ==
Anderson began his career in Indonesia, where he joined PSS Sleman after being recruited from the CFZ do Rio in Rio de Janeiro. In 2008, he moved to the city of Surabaya exactly in the Persebaya Surabaya. In the 2010–11 season, he played for the club Mitra Kukar. In opening season 2011–12, he moved to Persik Kediri.
