= Claude Ngon A Djam =

Cameroonian footballer

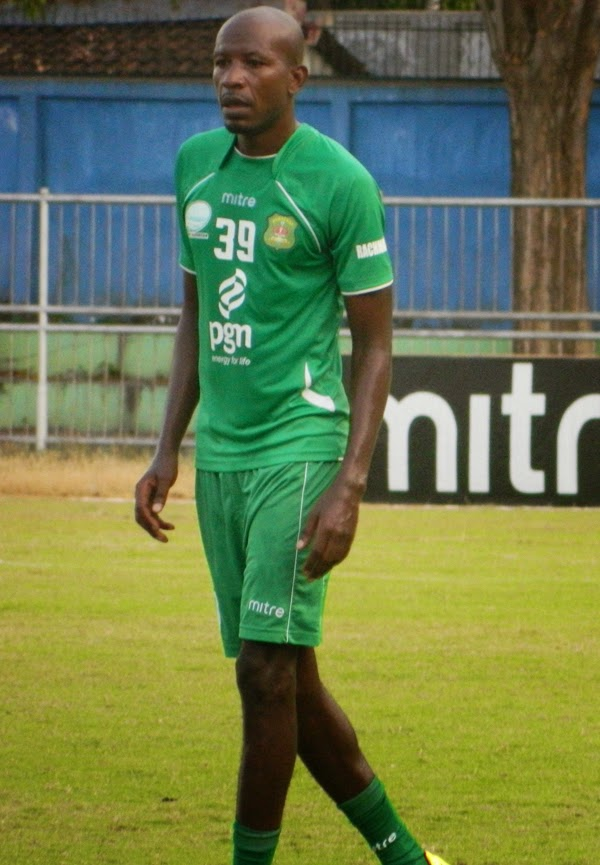
- Ngon A Djam with Persekap Pasuruan in 2014

Personal information
- Full name: Claude Parfait Ngon A Djam
- Date of birth: 24 January 1980 (age 46)
- Place of birth: Yaounde, Cameroon
- Height: 1.86 m (6 ft 1 in)
- Position: Forward

Senior career*
Years	Team	Apps	(Gls)
1999	Cheonnam Ilhwa Chunma	12	(5)
2001–2002	Coton Sport	15	(7)
2002–2003	Canon Yaoundé		
2004–2005	FK Riga		
2005–2006	Skonto Riga		
2006–2007	AC Horsens		(7)
2008–2009	Sriwijaya	34	(24)
2009–2010	Persebaya Surabaya	10	(3)
2011	Persema Malang		(18)
2011–2012	Persidafon Dafonsoro	14	(15)
2013	Persika Karawang		
2014	Persiba Bantul	12	(9)
2014–2016	Persekap Pasuruan		(8)
- * Club domestic league appearances and goals

Claude Parfait Ngon A Djam (born 24 January 1980) is a Cameroonian former professional footballer who played as a forward.

== International career ==
Ngon A Djam was selected for the 2003 FIFA Confederations Cup, but did not play.

== Honours ==
Sriwijaya

- Copa Indonesia: 2008–09
