= Patricio Morales =

Chilean footballer (born 1977)

Personal information
- Full name: Patricio Eliseo Morales Gaete
- Date of birth: 13 September 1977 (age 49)
- Place of birth: Concepción, Chile
- Height: 1.74 m (5 ft 9 in)
- Position: Striker

Senior career*
Years	Team	Apps	(Gls)
1998–1999	Deportes Talcahuano		
2000	Colo-Colo		
2001	Magallanes		
2002	Huachipato		
2003	Deportes Talcahuano		
2004–2005	Naval		
2006–2007	Lota Schwager		
2007–2009	Arema Indonesia	34	(17)
2009–2010	Lota Schwager	15	(8)
2010–2011	Persik Kediri	21	(5)
2011–2012	Persebaya Surabaya	14	(4)
2012	Lota Schwager	28	(10)
2012	Fernández Vial		
2013	Linares Unido		
- * Club domestic league appearances and goals

Patricio Eliseo Morales Gaete (born 13 September 1977) is a Chilean former footballer who played predominantly as a striker.
