= John Tarkpor =

Liberian footballer (1986–2025)

Personal information
- Full name: John Tarkpor Sonkaliey
- Date of birth: 16 October 1986
- Place of birth: Monrovia, Liberia
- Date of death: 23 June 2025 (aged 38)
- Place of death: Monrovia, Liberia
- Height: 1.65 m (5 ft 5 in)
- Position: Midfielder

Senior career*
| Years | Team | Apps | (Gls) |
| 2002 | Mighty Blue Angels | 32 | (5) |
| 2003 | Mighty Barrolle | 23 | (0) |
| 2004 | LPRC Oilers | 10 | (0) |
| 2005–2006 | Persiter Ternate | 29 | (3) |
| 2007–2009 | Persitara North Jakarta | 66 | (14) |
| 2009–2011 | Persebaya Surabaya | 34 | (5) |
| 2011–2012 | Pelita Jaya | 30 | (6) |
| 2013 | Persiter Ternate | 17 | (0) |
| 2014–2015 | Persijap Jepara | 13 | |
| Total | | 273 | (33) |

International career
| 2003 | Liberia | 5 | (0) |
- * Club domestic league appearances and goals

John Tarkpor Sonkaliey (16 October 1986 – 23 June 2025) was a Liberian professional footballer who played as a midfielder. He made five appearances for the Liberia national team in 2003.

Tarkpor died in Monrovia on 23 June 2025, at the age of 38.

== Honors ==
Mighty Blue Angels

- Liberian Cup: 2002
