= Danurwindo =

Indonesian footballer

Personal information
- Full name: Muhammad Danurwindo
- Date of birth: 15 May 1951 (age 75)
- Place of birth: Purworejo, Central Java, Indonesia

Senior career*
Years	Team	Apps	(Gls)
1969–1971	Indonesia Muda		
1971–1976	Jayakarta		
1978–1982	Arseto Solo		

International career
1979	Indonesia		

Managerial career
- 1983–1987: Arseto Solo
- 1987–2004: Pelita Jaya
- 1996: Indonesia
- 2004–2006: Persema Malang
- 2007: Bontang PKT
- 2008–2009: Persija Jakarta
- 2009–2010: Persebaya Surabaya
- 2017–2020: Indonesia (Technical director)
- 2020–2021: Indonesia (Technical advisor)
- * Club domestic league appearances and goals

Muhammad Danurwindo (born 15 May 1951 in Purworejo, Central Java) is a former Indonesian footballer, coach, and technical director of the Indonesia national football team.

== Early interest ==
Danurwindo had interest in sports, which led to a successful career in football. He played as a professional footballer before transitioning into coaching.

== Honours ==
=== Manager ===
Arseto Solo

- Piala Galatama: 1985
- Galatama-Perserikatan Invitational Championship: 1987
- Galatama: 1987

Pelita Jaya

- Galatama: 1988–89, 1990, 1993–94
- Piala Utama: 1992
