= Syamsul Chaeruddin =

Indonesian footballer

Personal information
- Full name: Syamsul Bachri Chaeruddin
- Date of birth: 9 February 1983 (age 43)
- Place of birth: Gowa, Indonesia
- Height: 1.65 m (5 ft 5 in)
- Position: Midfielder

Youth career
- 1997–1999: Persigowa Gowa
- 1999: Makasar Football Club
- 1999–2000: PSM Makassar

Senior career*
Years	Team	Apps	(Gls)
2001–2010	PSM Makassar	130	(18)
2010–2011	Persija Jakarta	20	(12)
2011–2012	Sriwijaya	24	(10)
2012–2017	PSM Makassar	62	(15)
2018	PSS Sleman	6	(0)
Total		242	(55)

International career
2002	Indonesia U21		
2003–2005	Indonesia U23		
2004–2009	Indonesia	35	(0)
- * Club domestic league appearances and goals

Syamsul Bachri Chaeruddin (born 9 February 1983) is an Indonesian former footballer who played as a midfielder for the Indonesia national football team.

Born in Gowa, South Sulawesi, Syamsul played for PSM Makassar in the 2005 AFC Champions League group stage, where he scored one goal.

Syamsul is one of the best defensive midfielders in his country with his aggression and a courageous playing style, despite his small stature. He made his international debut for the national team in the 0–0 drew in a friendly match against Malaysia on 12 March 2004. At the Asian Cup 2007 he played 3 times: in a 2–1 win against Bahrain (as substitute for Mahyadi Panggabean, who was injured); in a 1–2 loss against Saudi Arabia, and in a 0–1 loss to South Korea, the last game in Group D.

== National team career ==
- 2002: Junior National Team U-21, Tiger Cup (selection)
- 2003: Pre Olympic, Sea Games XXII Vietnam
- 2004: Pre World Cup, Tiger Cup
- 2005: Sea Games XXIII Philippines
- 2006: Brunei Merdeka Games, BV International Cup
- 2007: AFF Cup, Asian Cup

== Honours ==
Sriwijaya

- Indonesia Super League: 2011–12
- Inter Island Cup: 2012

Indonesia U-21

- Hassanal Bolkiah Trophy: 2002

Indonesia

- AFF Championship runner-up: 2004
- Indonesian Independence Cup: 2008
