= Persiwa Wamena =

Indonesian football club

- Full name: Persatuan Sepakbola Indonesia Wamena
- Nicknames: Badai Pegunungan (Highlands Storm)
- Founded: 1972; 54 years ago
- Dissolved: 2018; 8 years ago, merged with Bina Putra Cirebon
- Ground: Pendidikan Stadium
- Capacity: 15,000
- Owner: PT Persiwa Wamena
- Chairman: John Banua
- Head coach: Eduard Ivakdalam
- 2018: Liga 2, 12th East Group (relegated)

Persatuan Sepakbola Indonesia Wamena, commonly known as Persiwa Wamena, was an Indonesian football club based in Wamena, Jayawijaya Regency, Highland Papua.

== History ==
Although Persiwa became the runners-up in the 2014 Liga Indonesia Premier Division and got promoted, they were disqualified during the verification process for the 2015 Indonesia Super League. The club decided to play again in the Liga Indonesia Premier Division. Persiwa merged with Bina Putra FC during the 2018 Liga 2 season. Persiwa has been suspended since 2022 and therefore not able to participate in competitions held by the Football Association of Indonesia.

== Season by season records ==
Season	League/Division	Tms.	Pos.	Piala Indonesia
2003	Second Division	28	3rd, First round	–
2004	Second Division	41	3	–
2005	First Division	27	2	Second round
2006	Premier Division	28	5th, East division	Round of 16
2007–08	Premier Division	36	4th, Second round	Second round
2008–09	Indonesia Super League	18	2	Second round
2009–10	Indonesia Super League	18	6	First round
2010–11	Indonesia Super League	15	8	–
2011–12	Indonesia Super League	18	3	Did not participate
2013	Indonesia Super League	18	17	–
2014	Premier Division	63	2	–
2015				
2016
2017	Liga 2	61	4th, Second round	–
2018	Liga 2	24	12th, East division	Round of 32

== Performance in AFC competitions ==
Season	Competition	Round	Nat	Club	Home	Away
2010	AFC Cup	Group G	(Maldives)	VB Sports Club	2–3	0–4
2010	AFC Cup	Group G	(Hong Kong)	South China	0–2	3–6
2010	AFC Cup	Group G	(Thailand)	Muangthong United	2–2	1–4

== See also ==
- Wamena United (phoenix club)
