= 2011–12 Indonesia Super League =

Indonesia Super League
- Season: 2011–12
- Dates: 1 December 2011 – 11 July 2012
- Champions: Sriwijaya; 1st ISL title 2nd Indonesian title
- Relegated: PSMS; Deltras; PSAP
- Matches: 306
- Goals: 918 (3 per match)
- Top goalscorer: Alberto Gonçalves (25 goals)
- Biggest home win: Persidafon 6–0 Persiram (8 May 2012); Persipura 7–1 PSAP (7 June 2012)
- Biggest away win: Persiram 0–6 Persija (11 December 2011)
- Highest scoring: Persidafon 4–5 Persela (18 January 2012)
- Longest winning run: Sriwijaya (8 matches)
- Longest unbeaten run: Sriwijaya (20 matches)
- Longest winless run: Persiram; PSAP (9 matches)
- Longest losing run: Deltras (6 matches)
- Highest attendance: 50,000; Persija 2–2 Persib (27 May 2012)
- Lowest attendance: 0 Persiram 5–2 Persidafon (9 February 2012); Persib 0–1 Persipura (29 April 2012); Persidafon 0–3 Persiwa (WO) (12 June 2012); Persija 4–0 PSPS (19 June 2012); Persija 1–2 Persiram (30 June 2012)
- Total attendance: 3,129,700
- Average attendance: 10,228

The 2011–12 Indonesia Super League was the 4th season of the Indonesia Super League (ISL), a fully professional football competition as the top tier of the football league pyramid in Indonesia. The season began on 1 December 2011. Persipura were the defending champions, having won their 3rd league title the previous season.

This season was also the first season of ISL organized without authorization from PSSI due to internal conflict. PSSI under chairman Johar Arifin officially decided to replace ISL as a top level with the Indonesian Premier League. It was then recognized by other faction of PSSI under chairman La Nyalla Matalatti.

After the signing of the MoU between Djohar Arifin Husein (PSSI) and La Nyalla Matalitti (KPSI-PSSI) that was initiated by FIFA and the AFC through the AFC force task, Indonesia Super League was under the control of the joint committee to remain manageable by PT Liga Indonesia until the establishment of a new professional competition by the committee.

== Teams ==
Persibo, Persema, Bontang and PSM were joined to 2011–12 Indonesian Premier League. They were replaced by the best three teams from the 2010–11 Liga Indonesia Premier Division, Persiba Bantul, Mitra Kukar and Persiraja.

Fourth-placed Premier Division sides Persidafon were promoted to Indonesia Super League after winning the relegation/promotion play-off against 15th placed 2010–11 Indonesia Super League sides Bontang by score 3–2.

2010–11 Liga Indonesia Premier Division best-eight teams sides PSAP Sigli, Persiram, Gresik United and PSMS replaced Persijap, Semen Padang, Persiba Bantul and Persiraja after those four teams joined to 2011–12 Indonesian Premier League.

=== Stadium and locations ===
Locations of the teams in the 2011–12 Indonesia Super League

Club	Regency or City	Province	Stadium	Capacity	2010–11 season
Arema Indonesia	Malang Regency	East Java	Kanjuruhan	35,000	Super League Runners-up
Deltras	Sidoarjo Regency	East Java	Gelora Delta	35,000	13th in Super League
Gresik United	Gresik Regency	East Java	Petrokimia	25,000	5th in Premier Division
Mitra Kukar	Kutai Kartanegara	East Kalimantan	Aji Imbut	35,000	3rd in Premier Division
Pelita Jaya	Karawang Regency	West Java	Singaperbangsa	25,000	12th in Super League
Persela	Lamongan; Madiun Regency	East Java	Surajaya; Wilis	25,000; 20,000	9th in Super League
Persib	Bandung Regency; Bandung	West Java	Si Jalak Harupat; Siliwangi	40,000; 25,000	7th in Super League
Persiba	Balikpapan	East Kalimantan	Persiba Stadium	12,500	10th in Super League
Persidafon	Jayapura; Jayapura Regency	Papua	Mandala^{1} Barnabas Youwe	30,000; 15,000	4th in Premier Division
Persija	Jakarta	DKI Jakarta	Gelora Bung Karno	88,083	3rd in Super League
Persipura	Jayapura	Papua	Mandala	30,000	Super League Champions
Persiram^{2}	Jakarta; Lamongan; Sorong Regency	Jakarta; East Java; West Papua	Lebak Bulus; Surajaya; Wambik KM 16^{4}	12,000; 25,000; 7,000	6th in Premier Division
Persisam Putra	Samarinda	East Kalimantan	Segiri	20,000	6th in Super League
Persiwa	Jayawijaya Regency	Papua	Pendidikan	15,000	8th in Super League
PSAP Sigli^{3}	Banda Aceh; Sigli	Aceh	Harapan Bangsa; Kuta Asan	40,000; 15,000	7th in Premier Division
PSMS	Medan	North Sumatra	Teladan	20,000	8th in Premier Division
PSPS	Kuansing Regency	Riau	Sport Centre Kuansing	25,000	11th in Super League
Sriwijaya	Palembang	South Sumatera	Gelora Sriwijaya	40,000	5th in Super League

^{1} = Ground share with Persipura during Persidafon Stadium Barnabas Youwe renovation.
^{2} = Persiram was based in Jakarta because they had no stadium representative in Raja Ampat Islands.
^{3} = PSAP Sigli was based in Banda Aceh for a while since Kuta Asan stadium was being renovated.
^{4} = The stadium was almost complete renovation, Persiram could use it again on 10 March 2012 as host Persisam Putra Samarinda.

=== Personnel and kits ===
Note: Flags indicate national team as has been defined under FIFA eligibility rules. Players and Managers may hold more than one non-FIFA nationality.

Team	Coach	Captain	Kit manufacturer	Shirt sponsor
Arema Indonesia	(Indonesia) Suharno	(Cameroon) Herman Dzumafo (Note: Charis Yulianto was previously Arema's captain, he was replaced by Seme Pattrick as captain until April. Once recruited Herman Dzumafo from PSPS Pekanbaru. Dzumafo was handed the captaincy.)	Ultras	Ijen Nirwana
Deltras	(Indonesia) Blitz Tarigan	(Indonesia) Budi Sudarsono (Note: Budi Sudarsono was Deltras captain until January, when he was injured. Mijo Dadić was handed the captaincy in Budi's absence. Budi was handed the captaincy back in May after returning from injury.)	Adidas	Kahuripan Nirwana
Gresik United	(Indonesia) Djoko Susilo	(Argentina) Gustavo Chena (Note: Agus Indra Kurniawan was previously Gresik's captain until April.Now Gustavo Chena was handed the captaincy.)		PHONSKA, SADIKUN
Mitra Kukar	(Sweden) Stefan Hansson	(Indonesia) Hamka Hamzah (Note: Pierre Njanka was previously Mitra's captain. Following Njanka's transfer to Persisam Putra Samarinda, Hamka was handed the captaincy.)		Petrona
Pelita Jaya	(Indonesia) Rahmad Darmawan	(Malaysia) Safee Sali	Umbro	Anker Sport
Persela	(Czech Republic) Miroslav Janu	(Argentina) Gustavo Lopez	Diadora	Surabaya Post
Persib	(Indonesia) Robby Darwis	(Indonesia) Maman Abdurahman	Mitre	DAYA Adicipta Mustika
Persiba	(Austria) Hans-Peter Schaller	(Paraguay) Aldo Baretto	SPECS	Bankaltim, Artha Reka Satria
Persidafon	(Moldova) Sergei Dubrovin	(Indonesia) Eduard Ivakdalam		Bank Papua
Persija	(Indonesia) Iwan Setiawan	(Indonesia) Bambang Pamungkas	League	Forum Bersama Jakarta
Persipura	(Brazil) Jacksen F. Tiago	(Indonesia) Boaz Solossa (Note: Boaz Solossa was Persipura's captain until March, when he was diagnosed with knee injury. Gerald Pangkali was handed the captaincy in Boaz's absence.)	SPECS	Freeport Indonesia
Persiram	(Indonesia) Jaya Hartono	(Liberia) Kubay Quaiyan (Note: Oktovianus Maniani was previously Persiram's captain until May. Following Okto's fired by the management for leaving the team without permission, Kubay was handed the captaincy.)		Fourking Mandiri, Bank Papua
Persisam Putra	(Serbia) Misha Radovic	(Indonesia) Eka Ramdani (Note: Muhammad Roby was previously Persisam's captain until April, when he was sentenced for committing acts of discipline. Eka Ramdani was handed the captaincy.)	Lotto	Elty, Bankaltim
Persiwa	(Brazil) Gomes de Olivera	(Liberia) Boakay Eddie Foday	Umbro	Bank Papua
PSAP Sigli	(Indonesia) Jessie Mustamu	(Indonesia) Reza Fandi		
PSMS	Vacant	(Serbia) Saša Zečević (Note: Markus Haris Maulana was previously PSMS's captain. Following Markus's transfer to PSMS IPL, Novi Hendriawan and Zulkarnain was handed the captaincy until April. After that Saša Zečević was handed the captaincy.)	Eutag	Bakrie Sumatera Plantations
PSPS	(Indonesia) Mundari Karya	(Indonesia) Dedi Gusmawan (Note: Herman Dzumafo was previously PSPS's captain. Following Dzumafo's transfer to Arema Indonesia, Dedi Gusmawan was handed the captaincy.)		
Sriwijaya	(Indonesia) Kas Hartadi	(Indonesia) Ponaryo Astaman	SPECS	Bank Sumsel-Babel

Notes:

In addition, Nike will have a new design for their match ball (white from August to October and March to May; high-visibility yellow from November through February) called Seitiro, featuring a modified flame design.

=== Coach changes ===
==== Pre-season ====
Team	Outgoing coach	Manner of departure	Date of vacancy	Incoming coach	Date of appointment
Persija	(Indonesia) Rahmad Darmawan	Signed by Indonesia U-23	June 2011	(Montenegro) Dejan Gluscevic	August 2011
PSMS	(Indonesia) Freddy Mulli	Signed by Gresik United	July 2011	(Indonesia) Abdurrahman Gurning	July 2011
Persidafon	(Indonesia) Agus Yuwono	Contract terminated	July 2011	(Moldova) Sergei Dubrovin	August 2011
Mitra Kukar	(Indonesia) Benny Dollo	Contract terminated	July 2011	(Scotland) Simon McMenemy	September 2011
Persiwa	(Indonesia) Suharno	Contract terminated	July 2011	(Brazil) Gomes de Olivera	September 2011
PSPS	(Indonesia) Abdurrahman Gurning	Signed by PSMS Medan	July 2011	(Indonesia) Mundari Karya	September 2011
Sriwijaya	(Bulgaria) Ivan Kolev	Contract terminated	July 2011	(Indonesia) Kas Hartadi	September 2011
Persiram	(Malaysia) Raja Isa	Contract terminated	August 2011	(Indonesia) Bambang Nurdiansyah	August 2011
Deltras	(Indonesia) Nus Yadera	Contract terminated	August 2011	(Germany) Jörg Steinebrunner	September 2011
Persela	(Indonesia) Subangkit	Contract terminated	August 2011	(Czech Republic) Miroslav Janu	September 2011
Persija	(Montenegro) Dejan Gluscevic	Negotiation terminated	August 2011	(Indonesia) Iwan Setiawan	September 2011
Persib	(Indonesia) Daniel Roekito	Contract terminated	August 2011	(Serbia) Drago Mamić	September 2011
PSMS	(Indonesia) Abdurrahman Gurning	Resigned	August 2011	(Malaysia) Raja Isa	September 2011
Persisam Putra	(Indonesia) Hendri Susilo	Mutual consent	September 2011	(Indonesia) Daniel Roekito	September 2011
Arema Indonesia	(Czech Republic) Miroslav Janu	Signed by Persela Lamongan	September 2011	(Austria) Wolfgang Pikal	November 2011
Pelita Jaya	(Serbia) Misha Radovic	Sacked	22 October 2011	(Indonesia) Djajang Nurdjaman (caretaker)	22 October 2011

==== In season ====
Team	Outgoing coach	Manner of departure	Date of vacancy	Position in table	Incoming coach	Date of appointment
Arema Indonesia	(Austria) Wolfgang Pikal	Sacked	5 January 2012	16th	(Indonesia) Joko Susilo (caretaker)	5 January 2012
Pelita Jaya	(Indonesia) Djajang Nurdjaman	End of caretaker role	19 January 2012	9th	(Indonesia) Rahmad Darmawan	19 January 2012
PSMS	(Malaysia) Raja Isa	Sacked	3 February 2012	15th	(Indonesia) Suharto A.D (caretaker)	4 February 2012
Persisam Putra	(Indonesia) Daniel Roekito	Resigned	21 February 2012	10th	(Indonesia) Hendri Susilo (caretaker)	21 February 2012
Persiba	(Indonesia) Hariyadi	Mutual consent	6 March 2012	9th	(England) Peter Butler	7 March 2012
Mitra Kukar	(Scotland) Simon McMenemy	Sacked	23 March 2012	4th	(Indonesia) Sukardi Kardok (caretaker)	24 March 2012
Persib	(Serbia) Drago Mamić	Resigned	28 March 2012	7th	(Indonesia) Robby Darwis (caretaker)	28 March 2012
Gresik United	(Indonesia) Freddy Mulli	Resigned	28 March 2012	14th	(Indonesia) Abdurrahman Gurning	31 March 2012
Deltras	(Germany) Jörg Steinebrunner	Resigned	14 April 2012	17th	(Indonesia) Blitz Tarigan	15 April 2012
Mitra Kukar	(Indonesia) Sukardi Kardok	End of caretaker role	16 April 2012	5th	(Sweden) Stefan Hansson	17 April 2012
Persisam Putra	(Indonesia) Hendri Susilo	End of caretaker role	22 April 2012	11th	(Serbia) Misha Radovic	22 April 2012
PSAP	(Indonesia) Arman	Mutual consent	30 April 2012	17th	(Indonesia) Jessie Mustamu	30 April 2012
Persiba	(England) Peter Butler	Resigned	8 May 2012	6th	(Austria) Hans-Peter Schaller	10 May 2012
Arema Indonesia	(Indonesia) Joko Susilo	End of caretaker role	10 May 2012	18th	(Indonesia) Suharno	10 May 2012
Gresik United	(Indonesia) Abdurrahman Gurning	Sacked	10 May 2012	12th	(Indonesia) Djoko Susilo	11 May 2012
Persiram	(Indonesia) Bambang Nurdiansyah	Sacked	4 June 2012	18th	(Indonesia) Jaya Hartono	6 June 2012

== Foreign players ==
Club	Visa 1	Visa 2	Visa 3	Asian-Visa 1	Asian-Visa 2	Non-Visa Foreign	Former Player
Arema Indonesia	(Cameroon) Seme Patrick	(Cameroon) Alain N'Kong (Note: Replacement of foreign players in the second phase of the Transfer Windows)	(Cameroon) Herman Dzumafo	(Australia) Steve Hesketh	(Singapore) Muhammad Ridhuan	None	(Argentina) Rodrigo Santoni (Brazil) Márcio Souza (South Korea) Kim Yong-hee
Deltras	(Croatia) Mijo Dadic	(Ivory Coast) Lacine Kone	(Liberia) James Koko	(Australia) Sean Rooney	(Australia) Srećko Mitrović	None	(Liberia) Amos Marah (Argentina) Walter Brizuela (South Korea) Shin Hyun-joon
Gresik United	(Argentina) Gaston Castano	(Argentina) Gustavo Chena	(Argentina) Claudio Pronetto	(Syria) Marwan Sayedeh	(Australia) Daniel Zeleny (Note: New players in the second phase of the Transfer Windows)	None	(Liberia) James Koko
Mitra Kukar	(Argentina) Esteban Herrera	(Brazil) Anderson da Silva	(Netherlands) Kevin Olivieira (Note: Injury Replacement Players)	(South Korea) Lee Sang-min	(Japan) Seiji Kaneko	None	(Serbia) Nemanja Obrić (England) Marcus Bent (Cameroon) Pierre Njanka (Cameroon) Gustave Bahoken
Pelita Jaya	(North Macedonia) Aleksandar Bajevski	(Bulgaria) Stanislav Zhekov	(Liberia) John Tarkpor	(Malaysia) Safee Sali	None	(Netherlands) Jhon van Beukering (Note: Those players who were born and started their professional career abroad but have since gained Indonesia Residency) (Nigeria) Victor Igbonefo (Note: Foreign residents or foreign residents of Indonesian descent who have chosen to represent the Indonesia national team) (Nigeria) Greg Nwokolo	(Serbia) Saša Radivojević
Persela	(Argentina) Gustavo Lopez	(Slovakia) Roman Golian	(Argentina) Mario Costas	(South Korea) Oh In-kyun	(South Korea) Park Chul-hyung	None	(Philippines) Satoshi Ōtomo (Cameroon) Gustave Bahoken (Cameroon) Serge Emalue
Persib	(Cameroon) Abanda Herman	(Montenegro) Miljan Radović	(Brazil) Marcio Souza	(Australia) Robert Gaspar	(Singapore) Noh Alam Shah	None	(Montenegro) Zdravko Dragićević (Ghana) Moses Sakyi
Persiba	(Paraguay) Aldo Barreto	(Croatia) Tomislav Labudović	(Uruguay) Esteban Guillén	(Japan) Kenji Adachihara	(Japan) Shohei Matsunaga	None	(Paraguay) Richard Caceres
Persidafon	(Argentina) Marcelo Cirelli	(Cameroon) Eric Bayemi	(Cameroon) Ngon A Djam	(Singapore) Itimi Dickson	None	None	None
Persija	(Brazil) Fabiano Beltrame	(Argentina) Robertino Pugliara	(Paraguay) Pedro Velázquez	(Singapore) Precious Emuejeraye	(South Korea) Jeong Kwang-sik	None	None
Persipura	(Cameroon) Bio Paulin	(Liberia) Zah Rahan Krangar	(Brazil) Alberto Gonçalves	(South Korea) Yoo Jae-hoon	(South Korea) Choi Dong-soo	None	None
Persiram	(Liberia) Kubay Quaiyan	(Cameroon) J.P. Boumsong	(Brazil) Anderson	(Japan) Tomoyuki Sakai	(South Korea) Yoo Wook-jin	None	(Liberia) Pello Benson (South Korea) Jeon Sung-ha
Persisam Putra	(Cameroon) Luc Zoa	(Montenegro) Srđan Lopičić	(Cameroon) Pierre Njanka	(Liberia) Boima Karpeh	(South Korea) Kim Dong-chan	(Uruguay) Cristian Gonzáles	(Uruguay) Ronald Fagundez
Persiwa	(Liberia) Boakay Foday	(Liberia) Erick Weeks	(Nigeria) O.K. John	(Japan) Yuichi Shibakoya	(South Korea) Kim Kang-hyun	None	None
PSAP	(South Africa) Sthembiso Ntombela	(Mali) Camara Sekou	(Sierra Leone) Abu Bakar	(South Korea) Lee Soung-yong	(South Korea) Jeon Sung-ha	None	(South Africa) Mfundo Cecil (South Korea) Yoo Wook-jin
PSMS	(Serbia) Saša Zečević	(Nigeria) Osas Saha	(Slovenia) Nastja Čeh	(South Korea) Shin Hyun-joon	None	(Netherlands) Ruben Wuarbanaran	(Chile) Luis Peña (South Korea) Oh In-kyun (South Korea) Choi Dong-soo
PSPS	(Cameroon) Patrice Nzekou	(Togo) Ali Khadaffi	(Nigeria) Kabir Bello	(South Korea) Joo Ki-hwan	(South Korea) Ko Jae-hyo	None	(Cameroon) Herman Dzumafo (South Korea) Park Chul-hyung (Paraguay) Roberto Acosta Collante
Sriwijaya	(Saint Kitts and Nevis) Keith Gumbs	(Cameroon) Thierry Gathuessi	(Brazil) Hilton Moreira	(South Korea) Lim Joon-sik	(Australia) Jamie Coyne	None	None

== League table ==
Pos	Team	Pld	W	D	L	GF	GA	GD	Pts	Qualification or relegation
1	Sriwijaya (C)	34	25	4	5	71	31	+40	79	
2	Persipura	34	20	8	6	65	35	+30	68	
3	Persiwa	34	19	4	11	60	42	+18	61	
4	Persela	34	15	11	8	58	43	+15	56	
5	Persija	34	14	10	10	53	36	+17	52	
6	Pelita Jaya	34	15	6	13	68	51	+17	51	
7	Persiba	34	14	9	11	60	55	+5	51	
8	Persib	34	14	7	13	49	49	0	49	
9	Mitra Kukar	34	14	5	15	57	56	+1	47	
10	Persidafon	34	13	7	14	57	65	−8	46	
11	Persisam Putra	34	12	7	15	44	42	+2	43	
12	Arema Indonesia	34	10	8	16	45	51	−6	38	
13	PSPS	34	11	5	18	40	54	−14	38	
14	Persiram (Note: Persijap Jepara, Persiraja Banda Aceh, Semen Padang, and Persiba Bantul withdrew from 2011–12 Indonesia Super League and moved to 2011–12 Indonesian Premier League, they were replaced by Persiram Raja Ampat, PSAP Sigli, PSMS Medan and Gresik United)	34	10	8	16	45	63	−18	38	
15	Gresik United	34	11	5	18	36	69	−33	38	Qualification for the relegation play-off
16	PSMS (R)	34	9	9	16	43	62	−19	36	Relegation to Premier Division
17	Deltras (R)	34	9	8	17	34	48	−14	35	Relegation to Premier Division
18	PSAP (R)	34	6	9	19	33	66	−33	27	Relegation to Premier Division

Updated to match(es) played on 11 July 2012. Source: 2011–12 Super League table
Rules for classification: 1) points; 2) goal difference; 3) number of goals scored.
(C) Champions; (R) Relegated

== Results ==
The fixtures for the Super League were released on 25 November 2011. The season kicked off on 1 December 2011 and concluded on 11 July 2012.

Home \ Away	ARE	DEL	GRE	MKU	PEL	PSL	PSB	PBA	PSDF	PSJ	PPR	PSRM	PPSA	PWA	PSAP	MED	RIA	SRI
Arema Indonesia		3–1	0–0	5–3	3–2	0–1	2–1	3–1	4–0	1–1	1–2	2–2	1–0	2–1	0–0	2–1	2–0	1–5
Deltras	3–3		1–1	0–0	2–0	1–0	0–0	2–0	0–1	1–0	1–1	2–2	1–3	1–2	2–1	0–1	1–0	0–1
Gresik United	2–0	2–1		1–2	1–6	3–2	2–0	0–2	3–2	2–0	2–1	1–0	1–1	1–0	1–0	2–2	0–1	1–5
Mitra Kukar	2–2	1–0	4–1		1–0	2–0	3–0	0–0	0–1	3–0	1–2	2–1	0–1	6–1	3–1	3–1	3–1	0–1
Pelita Jaya	2–1	3–0	4–0	4–0		1–0	1–3	1–3	1–1	0–2	3–2	2–1	3–0	2–1	5–2	2–2	4–1	1–3
Persela	3–1	1–1	6–2	2–1	2–2		3–1	2–1	2–1	2–2	0–0	5–1	1–0	2–2	2–0	2–1	3–1	1–1
Persib	2–0	3–1	1–0	5–0	3–2	1–1		2–3	3–2	1–0	0–1	3–2	0–0	3–0	1–1	3–1	2–1	1–0
Persiba	2–1	4–1	4–2	3–1	1–1	0–0	2–1		1–2	2–2	1–2	5–1	3–2	3–1	1–1	3–1	4–1	2–3
Persidafon	2–1	2–1	3–0	2–1	1–1	4–5	2–2	2–2		3–1	1–1	6–0	2–1	0–3 (Note: Persidafon Dafonsoro loses 0–3 against Persiwa Wamena after failing to hold the match on 12 June 2012 at Barnabas Youwe Stadium)	4–2	4–1	2–1	2–2
Persija	1–0	1–0	2–0	1–1	2–1	1–1	2–2	4–0	0–0		1–0	1–2	0–0	1–2	5–1	1–0	4–0	3–0
Persipura	2–1	2–1	3–1	4–2	2–1	2–1	4–0	3–3	3–1	0–1		3–1	3–1	1–1	7–1	5–0	2–1	2–1
Persiram	1–0	3–1	1–1	2–1	2–1	2–2	1–2	1–0	5–2	0–6	0–0		0–0	2–1	4–1	3–0 (Note: PSMS Medan loses 0–3 against Persiram Raja Ampat after not attending the match on 30 May 2012 at Wombik Stadium)	1–2	1–2
Persisam Putra	2–0	1–1	4–0	1–2	1–4	0–1	2–1	0–1	3–0	1–1	3–1	2–2		2–0	3–1	4–2	2–1	0–1
Persiwa	1–0	2–1	4–2	3–1	4–2	1–0	3–0	2–0	3–0	4–1	0–1	3–0	1–0		4–1	3–1	3–0	1–0
PSAP	1–1	0–1	1–0	2–3	0–2	0–0	3–0	1–1	2–1	1–0	0–1	0–0	1–2	0–0		2–1	3–2	1–1
PSMS	1–1	1–3	0–1	1–1	1–2	4–3	3–2	4–1	1–0	3–3	0–0	1–0	1–0	1–1	2–1		3–1	0–0
PSPS	1–0	0–1	3–0	3–1	1–1	0–2	0–0	0–0	4–1	0–2	2–2	2–1	2–1	2–0	3–0	1–1		1–0
Sriwijaya	2–1	3–1	3–0	4–3	2–1	3–0	1–0	5–1	5–0	2–1	1–0	1–0	3–1	3–2	3–1	2–0	2–1	

Updated to match(es) played on 11 July 2012. Source: 2011–12 Super League Schedule · 2011–12 Super League result
Legend: Blue = home team win; Yellow = draw; Red = away team win.

== Promotion/relegation play-off ==
17 July 2012
15:30 UTC+7

Gresik United (O) Indonesia Super League	3–1	PSIM Liga Indonesia Premier Division
Castano 27'; Chena 56', 74'	Report	80' Lukman

Gelora Sriwijaya Stadium
Attendance: 523
Referee: Dodi Setia Purnama (Indonesia)

NB: (O) = Play-off winner; (P) = Promoted to 2012–13 Indonesia Super League; (R) = Relegated to 2012–13 Liga Indonesia Premier Division.

== Season statistics ==
=== Top scorers ===
Rank	Player	Club	Goals
1	(Brazil) Alberto Gonçalves	Persipura	25
2	(Argentina) Mario Costas	Persela	22
2	(Saint Kitts and Nevis) Keith Gumbs	Sriwijaya	22
3	(Nigeria) (Indonesia) Greg Nwokolo	Pelita Jaya	20
3	(Malaysia) Safee Sali	Pelita Jaya	20
4	(Liberia) Boakay Eddie Foday	Persiwa	19
4	(Nigeria) Osas Saha	PSMS	19
5	(Indonesia) Cristian Gonzáles	Persisam Putra	18
5	(Brazil) Hilton Moreira	Sriwijaya	18
6	(Paraguay) Aldo Barreto	Persiba	17

=== Own goals ===
Player	For	Club
(Indonesia) Dedi Gusmawan	Persela	PSPS
(Indonesia) Hamka Hamzah	Persisam Putra	Mitra Kukar
(Indonesia) Jajang Sukmara	Persipura	Persib
(Liberia) Kubay Quaiyan	Persib	Persiram
(Cameroon) Luc Zoa	Deltras	Persisam Putra
(Singapore) Precious Emuejeraye	Arema Indonesia	Persija
(Indonesia) Rahmad	Arema Indonesia	PSMS

=== Hat-tricks ===
Player	For	Against	Result	Date
(Brazil) Hilton Moreira	Sriwijaya	Arema Indonesia	5–1	8 January 2012
(Indonesia) Patrich Wanggai	Persidafon	Persela	4–5	18 January 2012
(Argentina) Mario Costas	Persela	Persidafon	5–4	18 January 2012
(Brazil) Marcio Souza	Arema Indonesia	Deltras	3–3	18 January 2012
(Argentina) Gaston Castano	Gresik United	Persidafon	3–2	18 February 2012
(Indonesia) Zaenal Arif	PSPS	Gresik United	3–0	6 March 2012
(Malaysia) Safee Sali^{4}	Pelita Jaya	Gresik United	6–1	24 March 2012
(Indonesia) Bambang Pamungkas	Persija	PSMS	3–3	30 March 2012
(Indonesia) Cristian Gonzáles^{4}	Persisam Putra	Gresik	4–0	29 May 2012
(Liberia) Eddie Foday	Persiwa	PSAP	4–1	3 June 2012
(Brazil) Alberto Gonçalves	Persipura	PSAP	7–1	7 June 2012
(Paraguay) Pedro Velázquez	Persija	PSPS	4–0	19 June 2012
(Argentina) Mario Costas	Persela	Gresik United	6–2	25 June 2012
(Brazil) Alberto Gonçalves	Persipura	Mitra Kukar	4–2	27 June 2012

- ^{4} Player scored 4 goals

=== Scoring ===
- First goal of the season: Ricardo Merani for Persiwa Wamena against Gresik United (1 December 2011)
- Fastest goal of the season: 13 seconds – Pedro Velázquez for Persija Jakarta against PSAP Sigli (18 April 2012)
- Largest winning margin: 6 goals
  - Persiram Raja Ampat 0–6 Persija Jakarta (11 December 2011)
  - Persidafon Dafonsoro 6–0 Persiram Raja Ampat (8 May 2012)
  - Persipura Jayapura 7–1 PSAP Sigli (7 June 2012)
- Highest scoring game: 9 goals
  - Persidafon Dafonsoro 4–5 Persela Lamongan (18 January 2012)
- Most goals scored in a match by a single team: 7 goals
  - Persipura Jayapura 7–1 PSAP Sigli (7 June 2012)
- Most goals scored in a match by a losing team: 4 goals
  - Persidafon Dafonsoro 4–5 Persela Lamongan (18 January 2012)
- Largest away winning margin: 6 goals
  - Persiram Raja Ampat 0–6 Persija Jakarta (11 December 2011)
- Most goals scored by an away team: 6 goals
  - Persiram Raja Ampat 0–6 Persija Jakarta (11 December 2011)
  - Gresik United 1–6 Pelita Jaya (24 March 2012)

=== Clean sheets ===
- Most Clean Sheets: 14
  - Persija Jakarta
- Fewest clean sheets: 5
  - Arema Indonesia
  - Persiba Balikpapan
  - Persidafon Dafonsoro

== Attendance ==
Pos	Team	Total	High	Low	Average	Change
1	Sriwijaya	362,079	43,103	11,356	21,299	+105.4%
2	Persib Bandung	293,571	30,000	0	17,269	+1.9%
3	Arema Indonesia	269,795	34,126	2,818	15,870	−21.5%
4	Persipura Jayapura	261,345	23,825	1,100	15,373	−22.5%
5	Gresik United	257,294	23,400	2,285	15,135	n/a^{†}
6	Persija Jakarta	244,435	50,000	0	14,379	−22.5%
7	Persisam Putra Samarinda	202,352	14,680	7,175	11,903	−0.3%
8	PSMS Medan	195,383	22,234	4,675	11,493	n/a^{†}
9	Persela Lamongan	179,380	12,159	6,500	10,552	+28.4%
10	Deltras	143,045	15,850	1,435	8,414	+24.4%
11	Persiwa Wamena	121,591	12,732	453	7,152	−38.6%
12	Pelita Jaya	101,670	15,887	2,549	5,981	−5.4%
13	Mitra Kukar	97,835	15,953	592	5,755	n/a^{†}
14	PSPS Pekanbaru	96,503	15,763	875	5,677	−50.1%
15	Persidafon Dafonsoro	83,899	13,650	0	4,935	n/a^{†}
16	PSAP Sigli	83,096	15,300	545	4,888	n/a^{†}
17	Persiba Balikpapan	75,037	6,471	2,314	4,414	−1.8%
18	Persiram Raja Ampat	61,390	15,230	0	3,611	n/a^{†}
	League total	3,129,700	50,000	0	10,228	−7.9%

Updated to games played on 11 July 2012
Source: Indonesia Super League
Notes:
^{†} Team played previous season in Premier Division.

Top 10
Attendance	Date	Home	Score	Away	Venue	Weekday	Time of Day
50,000	27 May 2012	Persija Jakarta	2–2	Persib Bandung	Gelora Bung Karno Stadium	Sunday	Afternoon
43,103	27 May 2012	Sriwijaya	1–0	Persipura Jayapura	Gelora Sriwijaya Stadium	Sunday	Evening
34,126	30 June 2012	Arema Indonesia	0–0	Gresik United	Kanjuruhan Stadium	Saturday	Evening
33,725	17 May 2012	Arema Indonesia	5–3	Mitra Kukar	Kanjuruhan Stadium	Thursday	Afternoon
31,830	12 June 2012	Arema Indonesia	3–1	Deltras	Kanjuruhan Stadium	Tuesday	Afternoon
30,000	29 January 2012	Persib Bandung	1–0	Persija Jakarta	Si Jalak Harupat Stadium	Sunday	Evening
29,753	3 March 2012	Sriwijaya	3–1	Persisam Putra Samarinda	Gelora Sriwijaya Stadium	Saturday	Afternoon
29,734	17 March 2012	Sriwijaya	1–0	Persiram Raja Ampat	Gelora Sriwijaya Stadium	Saturday	Evening
29,271	24 June 2012	Arema Indonesia	3–1	Persiba Balikpapan	Kanjuruhan Stadium	Sunday	Evening
25,553	20 June 2012	Sriwijaya	3–0	Persela Lamongan	Gelora Sriwijaya Stadium	Wednesday	Afternoon
