= 2014 Indonesia Super League =

Indonesia Super League
- Season: 2014
- Dates: 1 February – 7 November
- Champions: Persib; 1st ISL title 7th Indonesian title
- Relegated: Persepam Madura United; Persita; Persijap; Persiba Bantul
- Champions League: Persib
- AFC Cup: Persipura
- Matches: 247
- Goals: 670 (2.71 per match)
- Top goalscorer: Emmanuel Kenmogne (25 goals)
- Biggest home win: Arema Cronus 5–0 Persik (6 February 2014); Putra Samarinda 5–0 Perseru (9 February 2014); Arema Cronus 5–0 Gresik United (8 May 2014); Persib 5–0 Persijap (19 August 2014)
- Biggest away win: Persijap 0–8 Arema Cronus (5 September 2014)
- Highest scoring: Persijap 0–8 Arema Cronus (5 September 2014)
- Longest winning run: 5 matches Arema Cronus
- Longest unbeaten run: 18 matches Persipura
- Longest winless run: 10 matches Persiba Bantul
- Longest losing run: 9 matches Persijap
- Highest attendance: 66,143; Persija 0–0 Persib (10 August 2014)
- Lowest attendance: 79; Persiram 1–0 Putra Samarinda (17 March 2014)

The 2014 Indonesia Super League was the 6th season of the Indonesia Super League (ISL), a fully professional football competition as the top tier of the football league pyramid in Indonesia. The season was scheduled to begin in January 2014, but in the end PSSI decided that the competition would begin on 1 February 2014 and possibly end on 7 November 2014. Competition schedule was released on 17 January 2014 by PT Liga Indonesia in Jakarta.

Persipura were the defending champions, having won their fourth league title in 2013.

This season saw the merging of the ISL with the Indonesian Premier League (IPL) after three years of dualism. It was decided that only four teams from the Premier League would join the new Super League.

The 22 clubs were divided into two groups (regions) so that each group contained eleven participating teams; this was due to the many political agenda in Indonesia in 2014 such as the parliamentary election on 9 April 2014 and the presidential election on 9 July 2014.

== Teams ==
Indonesia Super League was followed by 22 clubs consisting of fourteen Super League teams, four teams of the Premier League, three Premier Division teams and one team winning the play-off between ranked 15th Super League and ranked 4th Premier Division.

PSPS Pekanbaru, Persidafon Dafonsoro and Persiwa Wamena were relegated during the end of the Previous season. They were replaced by the best three teams from the 2013 Liga Indonesia Premier Division (LI), Persebaya DU (Bhayangkara), Perseru Serui and Persik Kediri.

Fourth-placed Premier Division side Persikabo Bogor failed to be promoted to the Super League after losing to the 15th-placed finishers of 2013 Super League, Pelita Bandung Raya by the score of 2–1.

Four teams of the 2013 Indonesian Premier League would participate: Semen Padang, Persiba Bantul, Persijap Jepara and PSM Makassar.

The whole composition of the 22 teams above was decided by the PSSI executive committee members that were qualified as participants in the Indonesia Super League at a meeting held on 10 December 2013 at The Sultan Hotel, Jakarta. But the composition was still provisional because some clubs still had to resolve their financial problems. If not completed, they were then dropped from the competition. In addition, PSSI also gave an opportunity for the three clubs (Perseman Manokwari, Persepar Palangkaraya and Pro Duta) that were not included in the composition of the participants had been decided by PSSI to make an appeal.

PSSI and PT Liga Indonesia officially announced the 22 clubs were eligible to enter the Indonesia Super League (ISL) next season. See 2014 ISL schedule. The announcement of next season's participants was done by PSSI secretary general Joko Driyono in the office of PT Liga Indonesia in Kuningan Place, Kuningan, South Jakarta on Monday, 23 December 2013. With the 22 participants of the ISL, then certainly for the next season, the highest caste of Indonesian football league was divided into two areas/groups, with each area comprising 11 clubs.

=== Stadium and locations ===
Locations of the teams in the 2014 Indonesia Super League. Blue: Western Group. Red: Eastern Group

Club	Regency or City	Province	Stadium	Capacity	2013 season
Arema Cronus	Malang	East Java	Kanjuruhan	42,449	2nd in Super League
Barito Putera	Banjarmasin	South Kalimantan	Demang Lehman	15,000	6th in Super League
Gresik United	Gresik	East Java	Petrokimia	25,000	9th in Super League
Persepam Madura United	Pamekasan	East Java	Gelora Bangkalan	15,000	10th in Super League
Mitra Kukar	Kutai Kartanegara	East Kalimantan	Aji Imbut	35,000	3rd in 2013 Super League
Pelita Bandung Raya	Bandung	West Java	Si Jalak Harupat	40,000	15th in Super League
Persebaya ISL	Surabaya	East Java	Gelora Bung Tomo	55,000	Premier Division Champions
Persela	Lamongan	East Java	Surajaya	14,000	12th in Super League
Perseru Serui	Yapen Islands	Papua	Marora^{1} Mandala^{1}	5,000; 30,000	Premier Division Runner-up
Persib	Bandung	West Java	Si Jalak Harupat	40,000	4th in Super League
Persiba Balikpapan	Balikpapan	East Kalimantan	Persiba Stadium	12,500	13th in Super League
Persiba Bantul	Bantul	Yogyakarta	Sultan Agung	18,000	Premier League team
Persija	Jakarta	Jakarta	Gelora Bung Karno	88,083	11th in Super League
Persijap	Jepara	Central Java	Gelora Bumi Kartini	23,000	Premier League team
Persik	Kediri	East Java	Brawijaya Stadium	20,000	Premier Division Third Place
Persipura	Jayapura	Papua	Mandala	30,000	Super League Champions
Persiram	Sorong Regency	West Papua	Maguwoharjo^{2}	31,700	8th in Super League
Persita	Tangerang	Banten	Singaperbangsa	20,000	14th in 2013 Super League
PSM	Makassar	South Sulawesi	Andi Mattalatta^{3} Gelora Mandiri^{3} Gelora Bung Tomo^{3}	15,000; 20,000; 55,000	Premier League team
Putra Samarinda	Samarinda	East Kalimantan	Segiri^{4} Palaran^{4}	16,000; 60,000	7th in 2013 Super League
Semen Padang	Padang	West Sumatra	Haji Agus Salim	10,000	Premier League team
Sriwijaya	Palembang	South Sumatera	Gelora Sriwijaya	36,000	5th in Super League

Note:

^1Perseru Serui used Mandala Stadium in Jayapura due to Marora Stadium being renovated to meet the stadium standards set by the league.
^2Persiram Raja Ampat this season used Maguwoharjo Stadium in Sleman because their new stadium in Waisai was under construction and targeted to be completed in 2015.
^3PSM Makassar used Gelora Bung Tomo Stadium in Surabaya because their stadium was being renovated to meet standards.

^4Putra Samarinda moved the remaining home games of the Segiri Stadium towards Palaran Stadium.

=== Personnel and kits ===
Note: Flags indicate national team as has been defined under FIFA eligibility rules. Players and Managers may hold more than one non-FIFA nationality.

Team	Coach	Captain	Kit manufacturer	Shirt sponsor
Arema Cronus	(Indonesia) Suharno	(Indonesia) Ahmad Bustomi	Joma	Anker Sport
Barito Putera	(Indonesia) Salahudin	(Turkmenistan) Mekan Nasyrow^{1}	SPECS	Hasnur Group
Gresik United	(Argentina) Ángel Vera	(Brazil) Otávio Dutra^{2}	Joma	Phonska
Persepam MU	(Moldova) Arcan Iurie	(Indonesia) Zaenal Arief	Joma	Carrefour
Mitra Kukar	(Sweden) Stefan Hansson	(Indonesia) Zulkifli Syukur	Mitre	Petrona
Pelita Bandung Raya	(Serbia) Dejan Antonić	(Argentina) Gastón Castaño	Mitre	
Persebaya ISL	(Indonesia) Rahmad Darmawan	(Indonesia) Greg Nwokolo	SPECS	Avian Brands
Persela	(Indonesia) Eduard Tjong	(Indonesia) Choirul Huda	Diadora	So Nice
Perseru	Vacant	(Indonesia) Liston Fonataba	TBA	Bank Papua
Persib	(Indonesia) Djajang Nurdjaman	(Indonesia) Firman Utina	League	Achilles (home kit); Corsa (away kit); Bank BJB (homeaway kit)
Persiba Balikpapan	(Indonesia) Liestiadi	(Cameroon) Patrice Nzekou^{3}	Injers	Philips, Bankaltim
Persiba Bantul	(Indonesia) Sajuri Syahid	(Argentina) Ezequiel González^{4}	Reds!	Bantul
Persija	(Indonesia) Benny Dollo	(Brazil) Fabiano Beltrame	League	K-Vision
Persijap	(Indonesia) Yudi Suryata	(Brazil) Evaldo Silva	Eureka	Bank Jateng
Persik	(Indonesia) Hartono Ruslan	(Indonesia) Kusnul Yuli	Joma	
Persipura	(Brazil) Jacksen F. Tiago	(Indonesia) Boaz Solossa^{5}	SPECS	Freeport Indonesia
Persiram	(Brazil) Gomes de Olivera	(Liberia) Kubay Quaiyan		Fourking Mandiri
Persita	(Brazil) Fabio Oliveira	(Indonesia) Maman Abdurrahman	Mitre	Samudera Chandra Persada Indonesia
PSM	(Indonesia) Rudi Keltjes	(Indonesia) Ponaryo Astaman	Nike	Semen Bosowa
Putra Samarinda	(Indonesia) Nil Maizar	(Indonesia) Muhammad Roby	Joma	Bankaltim
Semen Padang	(Indonesia) Jafri Sastra	(Indonesia) Hengky Ardiles	Mizuno	Semen Indonesia
Sriwijaya	(Indonesia) Subangkit	(Indonesia) Erol Iba^{6}	Joma	Bukit Asam

^1Coach has appointed Mekan Nasyrow as captain Barito Putera replace Fathlul Rahman.
^2Coach has appointed Shohei Matsunaga as captain Gresik United replace Mahyadi Panggabean. Mahyadi take back the team captaincy before he suffered an injury, now captaincy handed by Otávio Dutra.
^3Wawan Hendrawan was captain of Persiba Balikpapan, replaced by Fernando Soler began on 15 March in a game against PSM Makassar. After Soler leave club captaincy handed by Patrice Nzekou.
^4Coach has appointed Ezequiel González as captain Persiba Bantul replace Eduardo Bizarro.
^5Boaz is Persipura captain but he suffered an injury. Ian Kabes was handed the captaincy in Boaz's absence on February.
^6Coach has appointed Erol Iba as captain Sriwijaya replace Lancine Koné.

=== Coach changes ===
==== Pre-season ====
Team	Outgoing coach	Manner of departure	Date of vacancy	Incoming coach	Date of appointment
Sriwijaya	(Indonesia) Kas Hartadi	Contract terminated	September 2013	(Indonesia) Subangkit	October 2013
Persebaya ISL	(Indonesia) Tony Ho	Mutual consent	September 2013	(Indonesia) Rahmad Darmawan	7 November 2013
Putra Samarinda	(Indonesia) Sartono Anwar	Resigned	September 2013	(Indonesia) Mundari Karya	12 November 2013
Persita	(Indonesia) Giman Nurjaman	End of caretaker role	September 2013	(Moldova) Arcan Iurie	2 December 2013
Gresik United	(Indonesia) Widodo C. Putro	End of contract	October 2013	(Indonesia) Agus Yuwono	17 November 2013
Persik	(Indonesia) Aris Budi	Mutual consent	7 October 2013	(Indonesia) Hartono Ruslan	5 December 2013
Pelita Bandung Raya	(France) Darko Janacković	Contract terminated	26 October 2013	(Serbia) Dejan Antonić	19 November 2013
Persela	(Indonesia) Didik Ludiyanto	End of caretaker role	October 2013	(Indonesia) Eduard Tjong	29 November 2013
Gresik United	(Indonesia) M. Basri	End of contract	October 2013	(Indonesia) Sajuri Syahid	30 January 2014
Persiram	(Brazil) Gomes de Oliveira	Contract ended	November 2013	(Indonesia) Widodo C. Putro	November 2013
PSM	(Indonesia) Imran Amirullah	End of caretaker role	November 2013	(Germany) Jörg Steinbrünner	24 November 2013
Arema Cronus	(Indonesia) Rahmad Darmawan	Signed by Persebaya ISL	7 November 2013	(Indonesia) Suharno	26 November 2013
Persiba Balikpapan	(Indonesia) Herry Kiswanto	Sacked	November 2013	(Indonesia) Jaya Hartono	4 December 2013
Persiram	(Indonesia) Widodo C. Putro	Signed by Indonesia	17 December 2013	(Brazil) Gomes de Oliveira	17 December 2013

==== In season ====
Team	Outgoing coach	Manner of departure	Date of vacancy	Position in table	Incoming coach	Date of appointment
PSM	(Germany) Jörg Steinbrünner	Resigned	12 February 2014	11th East	(Indonesia) Rudi Keltjes	12 February 2014
Persepam MU	(Indonesia) Daniel Roekito	Resigned	15 March 2014	9th East	(Moldova) Arcan Iurie	25 March 2014
Persita	(Moldova) Arcan Iurie	Resigned	21 March 2014	7th West	(Brazil) Fabio Oliveira	30 March 2014
Gresik United	(Indonesia) Agus Yuwono	Sacked	21 April 2014	9th West	(Argentina) Alfredo Vera	21 April 2014
Persijap	(Malaysia) Raja Isa	Sacked	29 April 2014	11th West	(Brazil) Evaldo Silva (interim player-coach)	29 April 2014
Perseru	(Indonesia) Robby Maruanaya	Contract terminated	2 May 2014	10th East	(Indonesia) Choirul Huda (interim)	2 May 2014
Putra Samarinda	(Indonesia) Mundari Karya	Resigned	9 May 2014	9th East	(Indonesia) Nil Maizar	11 May 2014
Persijap	(Brazil) Evaldo Silva (interim player-coach)	End of caretaker role	13 May 2014	11th West	(Indonesia) Yudi Suryata	13 May 2014
Persiba Balikpapan	(Indonesia) Jaya Hartono	Resigned	29 May 2014	9th East	(Indonesia) Liestiadi	29 May 2014

== Foreign players ==
Club	Visa 1	Visa 2	Visa 3	Asian Visa	Non-Visa Foreign^{1}	Former Player(s)
Arema Cronus	(Brazil) Alberto Gonçalves	(Cameroon) Thierry Gathuessi	(Argentina) Gustavo López	None	(Nigeria) Victor Igbonefo (Uruguay) Cristian Gonzáles	None
Barito Putera	(Cameroon) Herman Abanda	(Liberia) James Koko Lomell	(Turkmenistan) Mekan Nasyrow	(South Korea) Ha Dae-won	None	(Sierra Leone) Shaka Bangura (Paraguay) Juan Acuña
Gresik United	(Brazil) Otávio Dutra	(Argentina) Gustavo Chena	(Paraguay) Pedro Velázquez	(Japan) Shohei Matsunaga	None	(Senegal) Pape N'Diaye
Persepam MU	(Paraguay) Sílvio Escobar	(Paraguay) Diego Fretes	(Moldova) Eduard Văluţă	None	None	(Paraguay) José Jara (Cameroon) Alain N'Kong (Australia) Aboubakar Sillah
Mitra Kukar	(Liberia) Erick Weeks Lewis	(Brazil) Reinaldo Lobo	(Cameroon) Herman Dzumafo	(South Korea) Park Chul-hyung	(Netherlands) Raphael Maitimo (Netherlands) Diego Michiels	None
Pelita Bandung Raya	(Argentina) Gastón Castaño	(Latvia) Deniss Romanovs	(Serbia) Boban Nikolić	None	(Germany) Kim Kurniawan	None
Persebaya ISL	(Cameroon) Emmanuel Kenmogne	(Nigeria) O.K. John	(Liberia) Isaac Pupo	None	(Nigeria) Greg Nwokolo	(Paraguay) Julio Larrea (Singapore) Agu Casmir (Cameroon) Patrice Nzekou (Cameroon) Marcus Mokake
Persela	(Slovakia) Roman Golian	(Montenegro) Srđan Lopičić	(Spain) Addison Alves	None	None	None
Perseru	(Cameroon) Seme Pattrick	(Togo) Ali Khaddafi	(Cameroon) Jean-Paul Boumsong	None	None	(Nigeria) Sunday Oboh
Persib	(Mali) Makan Konaté	(Montenegro) Vladimir Vujović	(Mali) Djibril Coulibaly	None	None	None
Persiba Balikpapan	(Liberia) Ansu Toure	(Cameroon) Patrice Nzekou	(Senegal) Pape Latyr N'Diaye	None	None	(Argentina) Fernando Soler
Persiba Bantul	(Cameroon) Émile Mbamba	(Argentina) Ezequiel González	(Nigeria) George Oyedepo	(Japan) Atsushi Yonezawa	None	(Cameroon) Ngon A Djam (Brazil) Eduardo Bizzaro
Persija	(Brazil) Fabiano Beltrame	(Croatia) Ivan Bošnjak	(Liberia) Boakay Foday	(Nepal) Rohit Chand	None	(Bosnia and Herzegovina) Želimir Terkeš
Persijap	(Brazil) Evaldo Silva	(Liberia) John Tarkpor	(Argentina) Carlos Sciucatti	None	None	(Cameroon) Christian Lenglolo (South Korea) Han Dong-won (Brazil) Claudinho
Persik	(Cameroon) Guy Mamoun	(Nigeria) Udo Fortune	(Mali) Franck Bezi	TBD	None	(Cameroon) J.P. Boumsong (Nigeria) Michael Onwatuegwu
Persipura	(Cameroon) Bio Paulin	(South Korea) Yoo Jae-hoon	(Argentina) Robertino Pugliara	(South Korea) Lim Joon-sik	None	(Liberia) Boakay Foday
Persiram	(Liberia) Kubay Quaiyan	(Cameroon) Georges Mbida Messi	(Burkina Faso) Habib Bamogo	None	None	(Nigeria) Osas Saha
Persita	(Chile) Cristian Carrasco	(Chile) Luis Durán	None	(Japan) Kenji Adachihara	None	None
PSM	(Ivory Coast) Boman Aimé	(Guinea) Mamadou Diallo	(Guinea) Camara Fassawa	(Australia) Michael Baird	None	(Argentina) Mario Costas (Argentina) Robertino Pugliara (Slovakia) Roman Chmelo
Putra Samarinda	(Montenegro) Ilija Spasojević	(Uzbekistan) Pavel Solomin	(Syria) Naser Al Sebai	None	None	(Iran) Ebrahim Loveinian
Semen Padang	(Argentina) Esteban Vizcarra	(Cameroon) David Pagbe	(Nigeria) Osas Saha	(South Korea) Yoo Hyun-goo	None	(Argentina) Ezequiel González
Sriwijaya	(Ivory Coast) Lanciné Koné	(Mali) Abdoulaye Maïga	(Cameroon) Frank Ongfiang	None	None	(Iran) Vali Khorsandipish

Note:

^1Those players who were born and started their professional career abroad but have since gained Indonesian residency
^2Injury replacement players
^1Those players who were born and started their professional career abroad but have since gained Indonesian residency

^2Foreign residents or foreign residents of Indonesian descent who have chosen to represent Indonesia at international level

== First round ==
The first round matches took place between 1 February and 5 September 2014.

Tie-breaking criteria

Ranking in each group shall be determined as follows:

1. Greater number of points obtained in all the group matches;
2. Result of the direct match between the teams concerned;
3. Goal difference in all the group matches;
4. Greater number of goals scored in all the group matches.

If two or more teams are equal on the basis on the above four criteria, the place shall be determined as follows:

1. Drawing lots by the Organising Committee.

=== West ===
Pos	Team	Pld	W	D	L	GF	GA	GD	Pts	Qualification or relegation
1	Arema Cronus	20	14	4	2	49	13	+36	46	Advance to second round
2	Persib	20	12	5	3	42	20	+22	41	Advance to second round
3	Semen Padang	20	11	5	4	30	17	+13	38	Advance to second round
4	Pelita Bandung Raya	20	10	5	5	30	21	+9	35	Advance to second round
5	Persija	20	9	7	4	27	15	+12	34	
6	Sriwijaya	20	6	5	9	22	29	−7	23	
7	Barito Putera	20	6	4	10	23	31	−8	22	
8	Persik Kediri	20	6	3	11	29	36	−7	21 (Note: Persik Kediri 4 Pts; Persegres 1 Pt.)	
9	Gresik United	20	4	9	7	20	32	−12	21	
10	Persita (R)	20	4	3	13	21	35	−14	15	Relegation to Premier Division
11	Persijap (R)	20	2	2	16	11	55	−44	8	Relegation to Premier Division

Updated to match(es) played on 5 September 2014. Source: Soccerway and Liga Indonesia
Rules for classification: 1) points; 2) head-to-head points; 3) head-to-head goal difference; 4) head-to-head goals scored; 5) goal difference; 6) number of goals scored.
(R) Relegated

==== Results ====
Home \ Away	ARE	BPT	GRE	PBR	PSB	PSJ	PSJP	PSIK	PTA	SPD	SRI
Arema Cronus		2–0	5–0	3–0	2–2	1–0	4–1	5–0	1–1	1–2	3–1
Barito Putera	1–4		0–0	1–0	0–2	1–2	4–1	3–0	2–0	0–0	0–0
Gresik United	0–0	2–2		0–0	1–4	1–1	3–2	1–1	3–1	1–0	3–0
Pelita Bandung Raya	0–1	1–0	4–1		1–0	2–2	3–0	3–2	2–0	1–1	0–1
Persib	3–2	3–1	4–1	2–2		0–0	5–0	3–0	2–1	1–2	1–0
Persija	0–1	3–1	1–0	1–1	0–0		4–1	1–0	1–0	2–0	1–1
Persijap	0–8	0–2	0–0	1–2	1–1	0–2		1–0	0–2	1–2	1–0
Persik Kediri	2–2	4–1	3–0	1–2	0–3	2–1	4–0		3–1	1–2	5–1
Persita	0–1	1–2	3–2	1–3	1–2	0–4	4–0	1–1		2–4	1–1
Semen Padang	0–1	2–0	1–1	2–1	3–1	0–0	3–0	3–0	0–1		2–1
Sriwijaya	0–2	4–2	0–0	1–2	2–3	3–1	2–1	2–0	1–0	1–1	

Updated to match(es) played on 5 September 2014. Source: ISL schedule & result
Legend: Blue = home team win; Yellow = draw; Red = away team win.

=== East ===
Pos	Team	Pld	W	D	L	GF	GA	GD	Pts	Qualification or relegation
1	Persebaya ISL (Note: Persebaya ISL had three points deducted as a punishment from FIFA for failing to pay Serge Ngankou Elongo's salary, they were required to pay the player's salary along with an added 5% of it.)	20	14	4	2	47	13	+34	43	Advance to second round
2	Persipura	20	10	9	1	29	15	+14	39	Advance to second round
3	Mitra Kukar	20	11	4	5	34	18	+16	37	Advance to second round
4	Persela	20	8	4	8	28	33	−5	28	Advance to second round
5	Persiba	20	7	4	9	21	28	−7	25 (Note: Persiba 12 Pts; Putra Samarinda 4 Pts; PSM 1 Pt.)	
6	Putra Samarinda	20	6	7	7	29	22	+7	25	
7	PSM	20	7	4	9	22	26	−4	25	
8	Perseru	20	6	5	9	21	29	−8	23 (Note: Perseru 8 Pts, +4 GD; Persiram 4 Pts, 0 GD; Persepam MU 4 Pts, −4 GD.)	
9	Persiram	20	6	5	9	17	21	−4	23	
10	Persepam Madura United (R)	20	6	5	9	28	35	−7	23	Relegation to Premier Division
11	Persiba Bantul (R)	20	2	3	15	17	53	−36	9	Relegation to Premier Division

Updated to match(es) played on 5 September 2014. Source: Soccerway and Liga Indonesia
Rules for classification: 1) points; 2) head-to-head points; 3) head-to-head goal difference; 4) head-to-head goals scored; 5) goal difference; 6) number of goals scored.
(R) Relegated

==== Results ====
Home \ Away	PPMU	MKU	BHA	PSL	PSR	PBA	PSBN	PPR	PSRM	PSM	PUSA
Persepam Madura United		1–1	1–4	3–1	1–1	4–1	3–1	1–2	2–1	1–0	1–1
Mitra Kukar	3–1		2–4	5–1	1–0	4–0	4–0	0–0	1–0	2–1	2–0
Persebaya ISL	3–1	2–1		3–0	4–0	4–0	4–1	1–1	1–1	4–0	1–0
Persela	3–0	1–1	3–0		1–3	1–1	2–0	2–0	2–1	3–1	2–2
Perseru	4–1	1–0	0–1	0–0		3–2	1–1	0–0	1–1	0–1	2–1
Persiba	2–1	0–1	0–0	0–2	2–0		1–1	1–2	3–0	1–0	1–0
Persiba Bantul	0–2	1–2	0–5	2–3	3–2	3–2		2–5	0–1	1–3	1–1
Persipura	2–2	1–1	2–1	3–0	2–1	1–0	2–0		1–0	1–1	2–0
Persiram	2–0	2–0	0–3	2–0	0–1	0–0	3–0	0–0		1–2	1–0
PSM	1–0	0–2	0–2	3–1	2–1	0–2	4–0	0–0	1–1		1–1
Putra Samarinda	2–2	2–1	0–0	3–0	5–0	1–2	3–0	2–2	3–0	2–1	

Updated to match(es) played on 5 September 2014. Source: ISL schedule & result
Legend: Blue = home team win; Yellow = draw; Red = away team win.

== Second round ==
This round divided the top four teams of each region in the first round into two groups of four. The second round matches took place between 4 October and 30 October 2014.

=== Group A ===
Pos	Team	Pld	W	D	L	GF	GA	GD	Pts	Qualification
1	Persipura	6	4	0	2	9	6	+3	12	Advance to knockout stage
2	Arema Cronus	6	3	2	1	14	7	+7	11	Advance to knockout stage
3	Semen Padang	6	3	1	2	10	8	+2	10	
4	Persela	6	0	1	5	6	18	−12	1	

Source: Soccerway
4 October 2014
13:30

Persipura	2–0	Persela
Bonai 62'; Kayame 89'	Report

Mandala Stadium, Jayapura
Attendance: 3,315
Referee: Nusur Fadillah
4 October 2014
15:30

Arema Cronus	2–1	Semen Padang
Samsul 7', 79'	Report	Nur Iskandar 86'

Kanjuruhan Stadium, Malang
Attendance: 16,677
Referee: Suharto

8 October 2014
15:30

Persela	2–2	Arema Cronus
Addison 3'; Taufiq 81'	Report	Alberto 68' (pen.); Samsul 87' (pen.)

Surajaya Stadium, Lamongan
Attendance: 11,157
Referee: Prasetyo Hadi
8 October 2014
19:00

Semen Padang	1–0	Persipura
Nur Iskandar 15'	Report

Haji Agus Salim Stadium, Padang
Attendance: 15,000
Referee: Handri Kristanto

12 October 2014
15:30

Semen Padang	4–2	Persela
Rudi 35'; Nur Iskandar 50'; Saha 72', 83'	Report	Addison 24'; Lopičić 79'

Haji Agus Salim Stadium, Padang
Attendance: 6,232
Referee: Oki Dwi Putra
12 October 2014
19:00

Arema Cronus	3–0	Persipura
Samsul 15', 59'; Gonzáles 90+3'	Report

Kanjuruhan Stadium, Malang
Attendance: 27,077
Referee: Dodi Setya Purnama

21 October 2014
13:30

Persipura	2–1	Arema Cronus
Kabes 38'; Pugliara 90+4'	Report	Gonzáles 27'

Mandala Stadium, Jayapura
Attendance: 17,782
Referee: Najamuddin Aspiran
21 October 2014
19:00

Persela	1–2	Semen Padang
Arif 62'	Report	Saha 16'; Airlangga 85'

Surajaya Stadium, Lamongan
Attendance: 6,357
Referee: Thoriq Alkatiri

25 October 2014
13:30

Persipura	1–0	Semen Padang
Boaz 61'	Report

Mandala Stadium, Jayapura
Attendance: 11,261
Referee: Oki Dwi Putra
25 October 2014
19:00

Arema Cronus	4–0	Persela
Gonzáles 1', 66'; Samsul 45+1' (pen.); López 53'	Report

Kanjuruhan Stadium, Malang
Attendance: 20,363
Referee: Hadiyana

29 October 2014
15:30

Semen Padang	2–2	Arema Cronus
Nur Iskandar 50'; Airlangga 83'	Report	Alberto 8'; Gonzáles 62'

Haji Agus Salim Stadium, Padang
Attendance: 12,234
Referee: Novari Ikhsan
29 October 2014
15:30

Persela	1–4	Persipura
Addison 34'	Report	Boaz 6'; Kabes 40', 52'; Robertino 90'

Surajaya Stadium, Lamongan
Attendance: 1,201
Referee: Kusni

==== Results ====
Home \ Away	ARE	PPR	SPD	PSL
Arema		3–0	2–1	4–0
Persipura	2–1		1–0	2–0
Semen Padang	2–2	1–0		4–2
Persela	2–2	1–4	1–2	

Legend: Blue = home team win; Yellow = draw; Red = away team win.

=== Group B ===
Pos	Team	Pld	W	D	L	GF	GA	GD	Pts	Qualification
1	Persib	6	4	1	1	11	7	+4	13	Advance to knockout stage
2	Pelita Bandung Raya	6	2	2	2	4	4	0	8	Advance to knockout stage
3	Mitra Kukar	6	1	2	3	8	10	−2	5 (Note: Tied on head-to-head results and overall goal difference. Overall goals for was used as the tiebreaker.)	
4	Persebaya ISL	6	0	5	1	7	9	−2	5	

Source: Soccerway
Notes:
6 October 2014
15:30

Persib	1–0	Pelita Bandung Raya
Jufriyanto 54'	Report

Si Jalak Harupat Stadium, Bandung
Attendance: 13,500
Referee: Hadiyana
6 October 2014
19:00

Persebaya ISL	1–1	Mitra Kukar
John 29'	Report	Dzumafo 82'

Gelora Bung Tomo Stadium, Surabaya
Attendance: 2,675
Referee: Mardi

10 October 2014
15:30

Pelita Bandung Raya	0–0	Persebaya ISL
	Report

Si Jalak Harupat Stadium, Bandung
Attendance: 567
Referee: Hamsir
10 October 2014
19:00

Mitra Kukar	2–3	Persib
Dzumafo 34'; Weeks 78'	Report	Konaté 19'; Atep 28'; Sinaga 74'

Aji Imbut Stadium, Tenggarong
Attendance: 3,518
Referee: Novari Ikhsan

14 October 2014
15:30

Persebaya ISL	1–1	Persib
Supardi 75' (o.g.)	Report	Konaté 11'

Gelora Bung Tomo Stadium, Surabaya
Attendance: 8,768
Referee: Gerry Rama Prabowo
14 October 2014
19:00

Mitra Kukar	1–0	Pelita Bandung Raya
Weeks 46'	Report

Aji Imbut Stadium, Tenggarong
Attendance: 1,519
Referee: M. Adung

21 October 2014
15:30

Pelita Bandung Raya	1–0	Mitra Kukar
Bambang 73'	Report

Si Jalak Harupat Stadium, Bandung
Attendance: 500
Referee: Nusur Fadillah
22 October 2014
15:30

Persib	3–1	Persebaya ISL
Konaté 70', 83' (pen.); Sinaga 90'	Report	Kenmogne 90+2'

Si Jalak Harupat Stadium, Bandung
Attendance: 25,500
Referee: Novari Ikhsan

26 October 2014
15:30

Persib	2–1	Mitra Kukar
Firman 72'; Vujović 90+3'	Report	Dzumafo 64'

Si Jalak Harupat Stadium, Bandung
Attendance: 27,500
Referee: Prasetyo Hadi
26 October 2014
19:00

Persebaya ISL	1–1	Pelita Bandung Raya
Kenmogne 26'	Report	Agus Indra 57'

Gelora Bung Tomo Stadium, Surabaya
Attendance: 2,246
Referee: Suyanto

30 October 2014
15:30

Pelita Bandung Raya	2–1	Persib
K. Kurniawan 51'; Wawan 79'	Report	Bambang 82' (o.g.)

Si Jalak Harupat Stadium, Bandung
Attendance: 5,000
Referee: Dodi Setya Purnama
30 October 2014
15:30

Mitra Kukar	3–3	Persebaya ISL
Maitimo 6' (pen.); Dzumafo 18'; Zulham 51'	Report	Pupo 13', 31'; Kenmogne 36'

Aji Imbut Stadium, Tenggarong
Attendance: 1,594
Referee: Handri Kristanto

==== Results ====
Home \ Away	BHA	PSB	MKU	PBR
Persebaya ISL		1–1	1–1	1–1
Persib	3–1		2–1	1–0
Mitra Kukar	3–3	2–3		1–0
Pelita Bandung Raya	0–0	2–1	1–0	

Legend: Blue = home team win; Yellow = draw; Red = away team win.

== Knockout stage ==
The semi-final matches were played on 4 November 2014 and the final was played on 7 November 2014. The matches were played at Gelora Sriwijaya Stadium.

=== Bracket ===
Semi-finals
4 November – Palembang
Persipura	2
Pelita Bandung Raya	0
4 November – Palembang
Persib (a.e.t.)	3
Arema Cronus	1

Final
7 November – Palembang
Persipura	2 (3)
Persib (p)	2 (5)

=== Semi-finals ===
Team 1	Score	Team 2
Persib	3–1	Arema Cronus
Persipura	2–0	Pelita Bandung Raya

4 November 2014
16:00 UTC+7

Persipura	2–0	Pelita Bandung Raya
Boaz 69', 71'	Report

Gelora Sriwijaya Stadium, Palembang
Attendance: 2,365
Referee: Prasetyo Hadi

4 November 2014
20:00 UTC+7

Persib	3–1 (a.e.t.)	Arema Cronus
Vujović 84'; Atep 91'; Konaté 112'	Report	Alberto 46'

Gelora Sriwijaya Stadium, Palembang
Attendance: 10,325
Referee: Handri Kristanto

=== Final ===
Team 1	Score	Team 2
Persipura	2–2 (3–5 p)	Persib

7 November 2014
18:30 UTC+7

Persipura	2–2 (a.e.t.)	Persib
Kabes 6'; Boaz 79'	Report	Im. Wanggai 45+5' (o.g.); Ridwan 53'
Penalties
Boaz (penalty scored); Pahabol (penalty scored); Pugliara (penalty scored); Alom (penalty missed)	3–5	(penalty scored) Konaté; (penalty scored) Sinaga; (penalty scored) Tony; (penalty scored) Supardi; (penalty scored) Jufriyanto

Gelora Sriwijaya Stadium, Palembang
Attendance: 30,165
Referee: Prasetyo Hadi

== Season statistics ==
Last Update: 7 November 2014

=== Top scorers ===
Rank	Players (Scorer)	Club	Goals
1	(Cameroon) Emmanuel Kenmogne	Persebaya ISL	25
2	(Indonesia) Samsul Arif	Arema Cronus	16
3	(Indonesia) Cristian Gonzáles	Arema Cronus	15
4	(Indonesia) Greg Nwokolo	Persebaya ISL	14
5	(Cameroon) Herman Dzumafo	Mitra Kukar	13
5	(Mali) Makan Konaté	Persib	13
7	(Indonesia) Ferdinand Sinaga	Persib	11
7	(Brazil) Alberto Gonçalves	Arema Cronus	11
7	(Indonesia) Boaz Solossa	Persipura	11
10	(Indonesia) Bambang Pamungkas	Pelita Bandung Raya	10
10	(Argentina) Esteban Vizcarra	Semen Padang	10
10	(Indonesia) Nur Iskandar	Semen Padang	10
10	(Montenegro) Ilija Spasojević	Putra Samarinda	10
10	(Cameroon) Guy Mamoun	Persik	10

=== Hat-tricks ===
Player	For	Result	Against	Date	Ref
(Montenegro) Ilija Spasojević	Putra Samarinda	5–0	Perseru	9 February 2014	
(Indonesia) Bijahil Chalwa	Persela	3–0	Persebaya ISL	10 February 2014	
(Cameroon) Herman Dzumafo	Mitra Kukar	5–1	Persela	20 February 2014	
(Montenegro) Srđan Lopičić	Persela	3–0	Persepam Madura United	10 March 2014	
(Cameroon) Emmanuel Kenmogne	Persebaya ISL	4–1	Persepam Madura United	14 March 2014	
(Indonesia) Boaz Solossa	Persipura	5–2	Persiba Bantul	2 May 2014	
(Indonesia) Samsul Arif	Arema Cronus	5–0	Gresik United	8 May 2014	
(Indonesia) Greg Nwokolo	Persebaya ISL	4–0	Persiba Balikpapan	8 June 2014	

== Achievements ==
The selection is done by a team of Technical Study Group (TSG) which was formed by PT Liga Indonesia. Indonesia's Goal.com also make their own monthly awards.

=== Monthly awards ===
Month	Coach of the Month		Player of the Month		Reference
Month	Coach	Club	Player	Club	Reference
February	(Indonesia) Suharno	Arema Cronus	(Indonesia) Cristian Gonzáles	Arema Cronus	
March	(Brazil) Gomes de Olivera	Persiram	(Mali) Djibril Coulibaly	Persib	
April					
May					
June					
August					
September					
October			(Latvia) Deniss Romanovs	Pelita Bandung Raya	

Note:
^1 From ISG PT. Liga Indonesia ^2 From Goal.com Indonesia In July, the league will have a break due to the presidential election and World Cup, also coincidentally with the holy month of Ramadan.

=== Season awards ===
Award	Names	Clubs
Coach of the Year		
Most Valuable Player	(Indonesia) Ferdinand Sinaga	Persib
Rookie of the Year	(Indonesia) Hendra Bayauw	Semen Padang
Best Goalkeeper	(Latvia) Deniss Romanovs	Pelita Bandung Raya
Top Scorer	(Cameroon) Emmanuel Kenmogne	Persebaya ISL

== See also ==
- 2014 Indonesia Premier Division
- 2014 Liga Nusantara
