= 2014 Mitra Kukar F.C. season =

Mitra Kukar
2014 season
- Chairman: Endri Erawan
- Head coach: Stefan Hansson
- Stadium: Aji Imbut Stadium
- Indonesian Super League: Second round (3rd in Group B)

The 2014 season saw the club competing in the Indonesia Super League.

== Squad ==
As of December 2014

No.	Nat.	Player	Pos.	ISL					Total				
No.	Nat.	Player	Pos.	Apps	Goal	Booked	Second yellow card	Sent off (straight red)	Apps	Goal	Booked	Second yellow card	Sent off (straight red)
21	(Indonesia)	Joice Sorongan	GK	6		1							
33	(Indonesia)	Dian Agus Prasetyo	GK	20									
35	(Indonesia)	Riki Pambudi	GK										
2	(Indonesia)	Irfan Raditya	GK										
3	(Indonesia)	Zulkifli Syukur	DF	24		3							
4	(Indonesia)	Zuhrizal Abdul Gamal	DF	4		2	1						
12	(Indonesia)	Ali Surahman	DF										
13	(Indonesia)	Gunawan Dwi Cahyo	DF	3		2							
15	(Indonesia)	Samsudin	DF										
16	(Indonesia)	Misriadi Didiet	MF										
20	(South Korea)	Park Chul-Hyung	DF	1									
24	(Indonesia)	Diego Michiels	DF	23		7							
27	(Indonesia)	Dedi Gusmawan	DF	22	1	4							
44	(Brazil)	Reinaldo Lobo	DF	26	2	1							
5	(Indonesia)	Hendra Ridwan	MF	9		3							
7	(Indonesia)	Zulham Zamrun	MF	24	7	3							
8	(Indonesia)	Raphael Maitimo	MF	21	1	6							
11	(Indonesia)	Bima Sakti	MF	24		3							
14	(Indonesia)	Fadil Sausu	MF										
19	(Indonesia)	Zulvin Zamrun	MF										
22	(Indonesia)	Tigam Alif Farisma	MF										
25	(Indonesia)	Yogi Rahadian	FW	1									
50	(Liberia)	Erick Weeks Lewis	MF	25	8	3	1						
77	(Indonesia)	Danan Puspito	MF										
10	(Indonesia)	Jajang Mulyana	FW	4	1	6							
18	(Indonesia)	Anindito Wahyu	FW	25	8	4							
25	(Indonesia)	Yoghi Rahadian	FW										
29	(Cameroon)	Herman Dzumafo	FW	23	13	2							
Own goals													
Total													

== Transfers ==
=== In ===
No.	Pos.	Name	Moving from	Type	Sources
	DF	(South Korea) Park Chul-Hyung	(Indonesia) Gresik United	Free	
	DF	(Brazil) Reinaldo Lobo	(Brazil) Novorizontino	Free	
	FW	(Cameroon) Herman Dzumafo Epandi	(Indonesia) Sriwijaya FC	Free	
	GK	(Indonesia) Dian Agus Prasetyo	(Indonesia) Barito Putera	Free	
	MF	(Indonesia) Zulvin Zamrun	(Indonesia) Persiba Balikpapan	Free	
	MF	(Indonesia) Bima Sakti	(Indonesia) Persepar Palangkaraya	Free	
	MF	(Liberia) Erick Weeks Lewis	(Liberia) Barrack Young Controllers	Free	

=== Out ===
No.	Pos.	Name	Moving to	Type	Sources
	MF	(Indonesia) Ahmad Bustomi	(Indonesia) Arema Cronus	Free	
	MF	(Indonesia) Arif Suyono	(Indonesia) Arema Cronus	Free	
	FW	(Argentina) Esteban Herrera		Free	
	DF	(Indonesia) Hamka Hamzah	(Malaysia) PKNS	Free	
	MF	(Argentina) Paolo Frangipane		Free	
	DF	(Indonesia) Rachmat Latief	(Indonesia) PSM Makassar	Free	
	DF	(Indonesia) Seftia Hadi	(Indonesia) Semen Padang	Free	
	FW	(Indonesia) Ahmad Amiruddin		Free	
	GK	(Indonesia) Syamsidar	(Indonesia) PSM Makassar	Free	
	MF	(Montenegro) Ilija Spasojević	(Indonesia) Putra Samarinda	Free	
