= Zulqarnain =

Zulqarnain can refer to:

- Dhul-Qarnayn, a figure mentioned in the Quran
- Zulqarnain (cricketer), Pakistani cricketer
- Zulkarnain (footballer) (born 1982), Indonesian footballer
- Zulqarnain Haider (disambiguation)

== See also ==
- Dulquer Salmaan, Indian actor
