= Novi Handriawan =

Indonesian footballer

Novi Handriawan.
Personal information
- Full name: Thomas Novi Handriawan
- Date of birth: 4 January 1986 (age 40)
- Place of birth: Deli Serdang, Indonesia
- Height: 1.78 m (5 ft 10 in)
- Position: Defender

Senior career*
Years	Team	Apps	(Gls)
2006–2007	PSDS Deli Serdang		
2007–2009	Semen Padang		
2009–2010	PSDS Deli Serdang		
2010–2013	PSMS Medan	38	(1)
- * Club domestic league appearances and goals as of 11 July 2012

Thomas Novi Handriawan (born November 4, 1986) is an Indonesian former footballer.

== Club statistics ==
Club	Season	Super League		Premier Division		Piala Indonesia		Total	
Club	Season	Apps	Goals	Apps	Goals	Apps	Goals	Apps	Goals
PSMS Medan	2011-12	30	1	-		-		30	1
Total		30	1	-		-		30	1
