= Älvsborgs FF =

Swedish football club

- Full name: Älvsborgs Fotbollförening
- Ground: Apelsinplan; Västra Frölunda; Sweden
- Chairman: Kristian Abel
- Coach: Stefan Hansson
- League: Division 3 Nordvästra Götaland
Home colours

Älvsborgs FF is a Swedish football club located in Västra Frölunda.

== Background ==
Älvsborgs FF currently (2016) plays in Division 3 Sydvästra Götaland which is the fifth tier of Swedish football. They play their home matches at the Påvelundsplan in Västra Frölunda.

The club is affiliated to Göteborgs Fotbollförbund. Älvsborgs FF have competed in the Svenska Cupen on 5 occasions and have played 7 matches in the competition. They played in the 2011 Svenska Cupen but lost 1–3 at home to IFK Fjärås in the preliminary round.

== Season to season ==
Season	Level	Division	Section	Position	Movements
2005	Tier 5	Division 4	Göteborg B	9th	
2006*	Tier 6	Division 4	Göteborg B	9th	
2007	Tier 6	Division 4	Göteborg B	8th	
2008	Tier 6	Division 4	Göteborg B	5th	
2009	Tier 6	Division 4	Göteborg B	9th	
2010	Tier 6	Division 4	Göteborg B	3rd	
2011	Tier 6	Division 4	Göteborg B	7th	

* League restructuring in 2006 resulted in a new division being created at Tier 3 and subsequent divisions dropping a level.
