= Ricardo Merani =

Indonesian footballer

Personal information
- Full name: Ricardo Robertho Merani
- Date of birth: 27 October 1989 (age 37)
- Place of birth: Wamena, Papua, Indonesia
- Height: 1.70 m (5 ft 7 in)
- Positions: Midfielder; defender

Youth career
- 2007: Praja Wibawa
- 2008−2010: Persiwa U-21

Senior career*
Years	Team	Apps	(Gls)
2010−2014	Persiwa Wamena	51	(1)
2015–2018	Perseru Serui	39	(1)
- * Club domestic league appearances and goals as of 11 December 2013

Ricardo Robertho Merani (born October 27, 1989, in Wamena, Papua, Indonesia) is an Indonesian former footballer.
