= Herman Dzumafo =

Cameroonian footballer (born 1980)

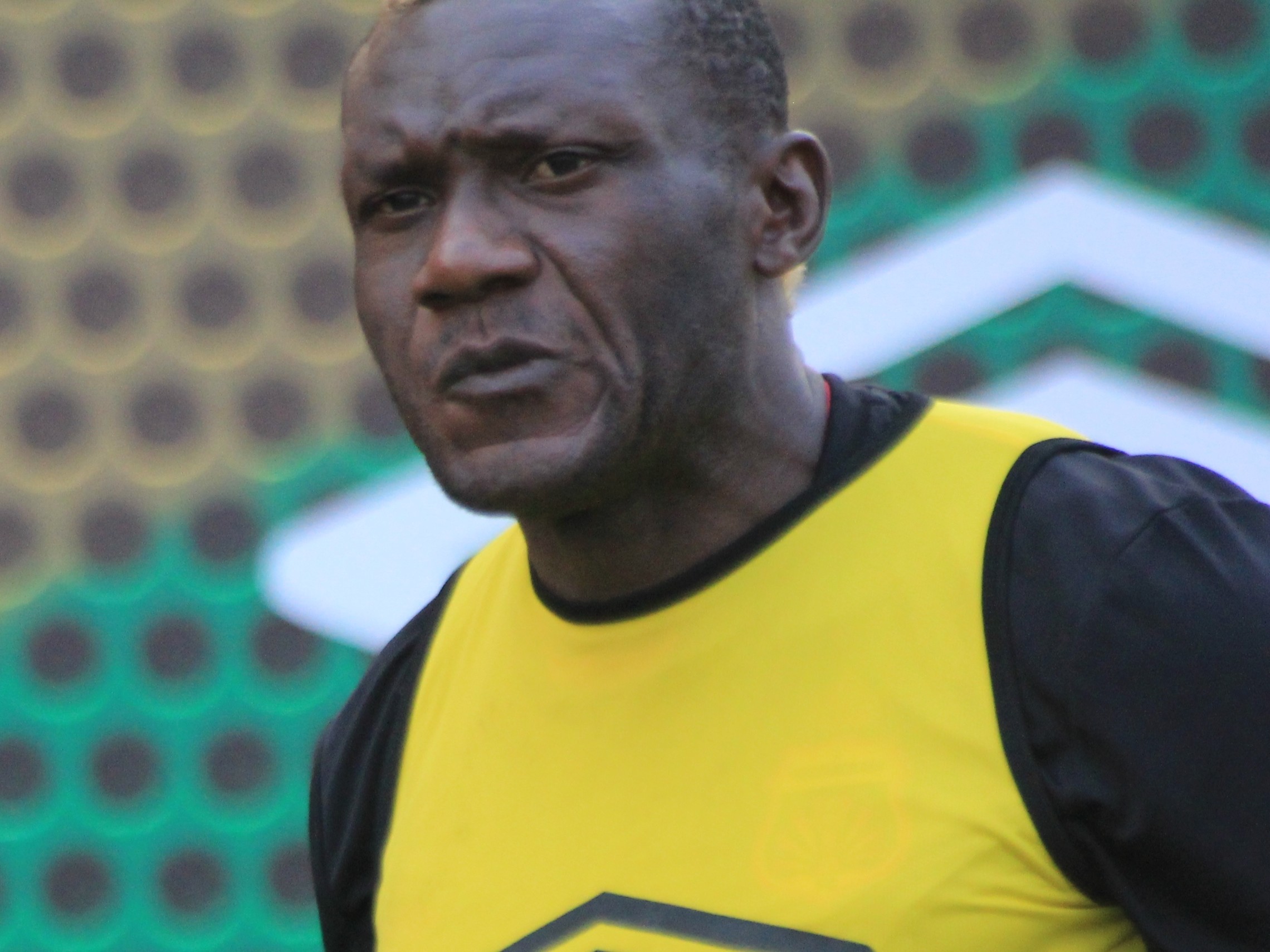
- Dzumafo with Bhayangkara in 2018

Personal information
- Full name: Herman Dzumafo Epandi
- Date of birth: 21 February 1980 (age 46)
- Place of birth: Douala, Cameroon
- Height: 1.86 m (6 ft 1 in)
- Position: Striker

Team information
- Current team: Persinab Nabire
- Number: 99

Senior career*
Years	Team	Apps	(Gls)
1999–2001	Caïman Douala	20	(8)
2001–2003	Cintra Yaoundé	22	(8)
2003–2005	Sable	27	(12)
2005–2007	Cotonsport Garoua	38	(11)
2007–2012	PSPS Pekanbaru	120	(60)
2012	Arema Indonesia	17	(6)
2012–2013	Persib Bandung	16	(5)
2013–2014	→ Sriwijaya (loan)	16	(7)
2014	Mitra Kukar	23	(13)
2015	Gresik United	3	(1)
2015	Borneo	5	(1)
2016	Persela Lamongan	16	(4)
2017	PSPS Pekanbaru	15	(11)
2018–2021	Bhayangkara	65	(21)
2021	Dewa United	14	(4)
2022	Bhayangkara	13	(6)
2022	Bekasi City	6	(2)
2023–2024	Persela Lamongan	16	(3)
2024–2025	Persiba Balikpapan	16	(9)
2025–	Persinab Nabire	9	(0)

International career
2001	Cameroon U20	1	(0)
- * Club domestic league appearances and goals as of 26 January 2026

Herman Dzumafo Epandi (born 21 February 1980) is a Cameroonian professional footballer who plays as a striker for Liga Nusantara club Persinab Nabire.

== Club career ==
=== PSPS Pekanbaru ===
He moved abroad and joined PSPS Pekanbaru in 2007 and quickly became the key player for PSPS Pekanbaru until 2012 when he decided to join Arema Indonesia (ISL). He spent most of his career in Cameroon before moved to Indonesia. In Indonesia Super League season 2009–2010, he is the most important player for PSPS Pekanbaru's coach, Abdul Rahman Gurning. Together with his duet Muhammad Isnaini, they scored many goals for PSPS Pekanbaru.

=== Arema Indonesia ===
On 5 April 2012, he joined Arema Indonesia (ISL). Dzumafo made his league debut on 17 April 2012 in a match against Persipura Jayapura. On 28 April 2012, Dzumafo scored his first goal for Arema Indonesia against Pelita Jaya in the 56th minute at the Kanjuruhan Stadium, Malang.

=== Persib Bandung ===
After a short spell at Arema, on 5 October 2012, he signed a contract with Persib Bandung. Dzumafo made his league debut on 13 January 2013 in a match against Persipura Jayapura. On 17 January 2013, Dzumafo scored his first goal for Persib against Persiwa Wamena in the 13th minute at the Siliwangi Stadium, Bandung. In May 2013, Sriwijaya and Persib Bandung agreed to exchange players. Dzumafo (to Sriwijaya) and Hilton Moreira (to Persib) eventually exchanged.

==== Sriwijaya (loan) ====
In 2013, Dzumafo joined Sriwijaya, on loan from Persib Bandung. He made his debut on 12 May 2013 in a match against Persiram Raja Ampat. On 16 May 2013, Dzumafo scored his first goal for Sriwijaya in the 22nd minute against Persidafon Dafonsoro at the Gelora Sriwijaya Stadium, Palembang.

=== Mitra Kukar ===
On 12 February 2014, he signed for Mitra Kukar. Dzumafo made his league debut on 15 February 2014 in a match against Perseru Serui. On 20 February 2014, Dzumafo scored his first goal for Mitra Kukar against Persela Lamongan in the 15th minute at the Aji Imbut Stadium, Tenggarong.

=== Persegres Gresik ===
In 2015, Dzumafo joined Persegres Gresik United. He made his debut on 5 April 2015 in a match against Borneo. On 11 April 2015, Dzumafo scored his first goal for Persegres Gresik in the 14th minute against Barito Putera.

=== PSPS Riau ===
In 2017, Dzumafo signed a with Liga 2 club PSPS Riau. He made 15 league appearances and scored 11 goals for PSPS.

=== Bhayangkara ===
On 4 January 2018, he joined Bhayangkara. Dzumafo made his league debut on 31 March 2018 in a match against PSMS Medan. On 31 March 2018, Dzumafo scored his first goal for Bhayangkara against PSMS in the 39th minute at the Teladan Stadium, Medan. He made 65 league appearances and scored 21 goals for Bhayangkara.

=== Dewa United ===
In 2021, Dzumafo signed a contract with Indonesian Liga 2 club Dewa United. He made his league debut on 28 September against RANS Cilegon. On 11 October 2021, Dzumafo scored his first goal for Dewa United against Badak Lampung in the 59th minute at the Gelora Bung Karno Madya Stadium, Jakarta.

=== Return to Bhayangkara ===
On 5 January 2022, it was confirmed that Dzumafo would re-join Bhayangkara, signing a year contract. He made his league debut in a 3–2 win against Madura United on 14 January 2022 as a substitute for Andik Vermansah in the 84th minute at the Kapten I Wayan Dipta Stadium, Gianyar.

=== Bekasi City ===
On 4 June 2022, it was announced that Dzumafo would be joining Bekasi City for the 2022–23 Liga 2 season.

== Personal life ==
In 2013, Dzumafo decided to convert to Islam. He said he found peace when he saw his teammates at Persib Bandung praying in congregation.

Born and raised in Cameroon, he acquired Indonesian citizenship in 2017.

== Honours ==
Dewa United

- Liga 2 third place (play-offs): 2021

Persiba Balikpapan

- Liga Nusantara Promotion play-offs: 2024–25

Individual

- Liga Indonesia Premier Division Top Goalscorer: 2008–09 (shared)
