= José Jara González =

Paraguayan footballer (born 1984)

José Jara
Personal information
- Full name: José Eduardo Jara González
- Date of birth: October 19, 1984 (age 42)
- Place of birth: Paraguay
- Height: 1.83 m (6 ft 0 in)
- Position: Striker

Senior career*
Years	Team	Apps	(Gls)
- Sport Colombia
- River Plate
- Libertad
- Cerro Porteño
- Universal
- Martín Ledesma
- Capitán Figari
- C.F. Pachuca
- Maccabi Nazareth
- Genoa
2014–2015	Persepam Madura Utama	6	(2)

International career
2000–2004	Paraguay U-20		
2001–2004	Paraguay U-23		
- * Club domestic league appearances and goals as of December 2014

José Eduardo Jara González (born October 19, 1984), known as José Jara, is a Paraguayan former footballer who currently plays as a striker and midfielder.
