= Misha Radovic =

Serbian football manager and former player

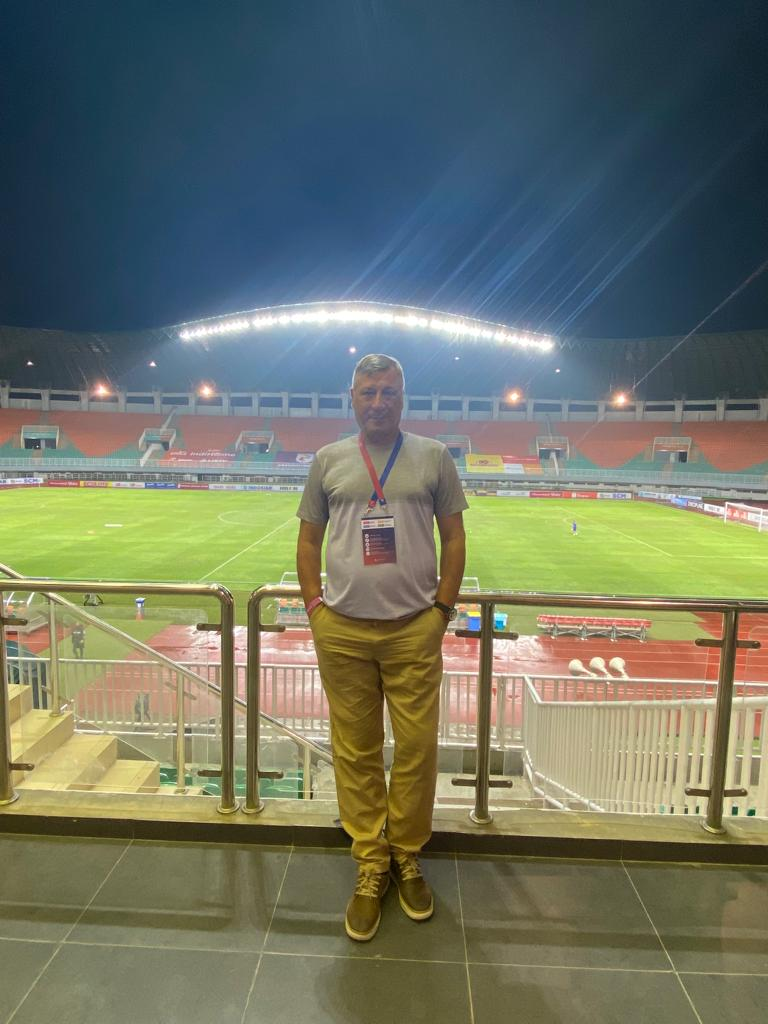

Personal information
- Full name: Miodrag Radović
- Date of birth: 12 September 1961 (age 65)
- Place of birth: Belgrade, SFR Yugoslavia
- Height: 1.80 m (5 ft 11 in)

Youth career
- 1968-1979: Red Star Belgrade

Senior career*
Years	Team	Apps	(Gls)
1976-1981	Red Star Belgrade		(0)
1981-1982	Vardar Skopje	11	(0)
1986-1989	Zemun	0	(0)
1989-1991	Bonnyrigg White Eagles		

International career
1979-1982	Yugoslavia U20		
1982-1983	Yugoslavia U21		

Managerial career
- 2002-2010: Soccer Sydney
- 2004: The Scots College
- 2007: Rockdale City Suns
- 2009: AC Milan (Academy)
- 2009–2010: Pelita Jaya
- 2012: Persisam Putra Samarinda
- 2021: Persis Solo
- 2022: Persis Solo
- * Club domestic league appearances and goals

Misha Radovic (Serbian Cyrillic: Миодраг Радовић – Миша; born in Belgrade, SR Serbia, Yugoslavia at September 12, 1961) is a Serbian former football player and manager.

He played with FK Vardar in the 1981–82 Yugoslav First League before coming to Australia in 1989. He is a founder of Soccer Sydney Academy in Australia. Misha has a UEFA Pro Licence and is therefore able to coach at the highest levels of World soccer. Together with ex AC Milan midfielder Andrea Icardi, Misha was head coach of AC Milan Academy in 2009. In October 2010, he was appointed manager of the Indonesia Super League team Pelita Jaya, owned by Indonesian billionaire Nirwan Bakrie. In April 2012, he was appointed as manager of another major team in Indonesia, Persisam Putra Samarinda. In this role, Misha saved the club from relegation. In October 2021, Misha came to Persis Solo, owned by Mr. Kaesang Pangarep, Mr. Erick Thohir, and Mr. Kevin Nugroho. As a Technical Director, he successfully helped Persis Solo to become Champions of League2 and to promote club to Liga1 2022, after 14 long years.

== Coaching Licence ==
=== Coaching Accreditations ===
- UEFA Pro Licence
- UEFA "A" Licence
- Football Association of Serbia "A" Licence
- Football Federation Australia "A" Licence
- Football Federation Australia Pro Licence

=== Licence Upgrade ===
- 2002 – Youth Coaching Licence N.S.W
- 2003 – Intermediate Licence N.S.W
- 2003 – Senior Coaching Licence N.S.W
- 2008 – UEFA "B" Accreditation Serbia
- 2009 – UEFA "A" Accreditation Serbia
- 2010 – Coach upgrade Nagoya Grampus, Japan under tuition of Pixie Stojkovic & Bosko Djurovski
- 2013 – UEFA Pro Licence

== Honours ==
=== Player Achievement ===
- Champion of Europe 1979 with Yugoslavia U19
- Youth Champion of Yugoslavia 1979/1980

=== Coaching Achievement ===
Queens Park Soccer Club, Australia

- Grand final Champions: 1

Persis Solo

- Champion of Liga 2 2021
- Surabaya Cup Winners 2022
