= Zulkarnain (footballer) =

Indonesian footballer

Personal information
- Date of birth: 14 September 1982 (age 44)
- Place of birth: Medan, Indonesia
- Height: 1.70 m (5 ft 7 in)
- Position: Midfielder

Senior career*
Years	Team	Apps	(Gls)
2006	PSDS Deli Serdang	23	(4)
2007	PSPS Pekanbaru	14	(0)
2008	PSSB Bireuen	20	(8)
2009–2010	Persiraja Banda Aceh	28	(7)
2010–2012	PSMS Medan	32	(5)
2013–2015	PS Kwarta	27	(0)
- * Club domestic league appearances and goals as of 25 April 2014

Zulkarnain (born on September 14, 1982, in Medan) is an Indonesian former footballer.

== Club statistics ==
Club	Season	Super League		Premier Division		Piala Indonesia		Total	
Club	Season	Apps	Goals	Apps	Goals	Apps	Goals	Apps	Goals
PSMS Medan	2011-12	27	4	-		-		27	4
Total		27	4	-		-		27	4
