= Saša Zečević =

Serbian footballer

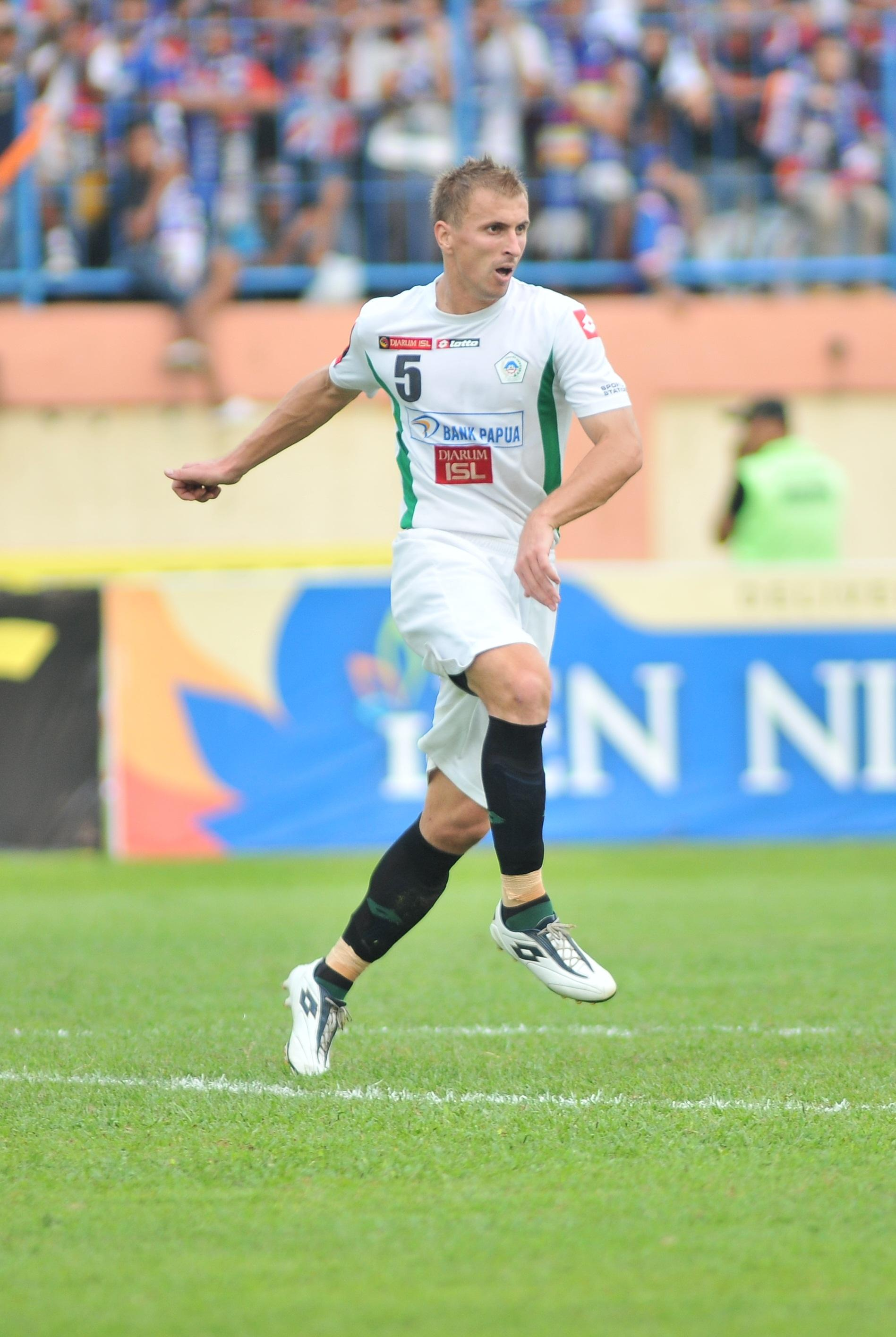
- Sasa Zecevic playing for Persiwa Wamena in 2011

Personal information
- Full name: Saša Zečević
- Date of birth: 20 November 1983 (age 42)
- Place of birth: Novi Sad, SFR Yugoslavia
- Height: 1.87 m (6 ft 1 1/2 in)
- Position: Centre-back

Youth career
- 1996-2004: Vojvodina

Senior career*
Years	Team	Apps	(Gls)
2004−2006	Vojvodina	0	(0)
2006−2008	Žepče	0	(0)
2008−2009	Rudar Prijedor		
2009−2010	Laktaši	14	(1)
2010−2011	Persiwa Wamena	19	(1)
2011−2012	PSMS Medan	28	(2)
2012−2013	Gresik United	29	(0)
2014	Southern Myanmar	12	(1)
2014–2017	Gresik United	34	(0)
2018–	Šajkaš 1908 Kovilj		
- * Club domestic league appearances and goals as of 08:39, 5 April 2015 (UTC)

Saša Zečević (born 20 November 1983) is a Serbian retired footballer, who played as a centre-back.

== Club career ==
In December 2014, he signed with Gresik United.
