= Miroslav Janů =

Czech footballer and manager

Personal information
- Date of birth: 8 November 1959
- Place of birth: Prague, Czechoslovakia
- Date of death: 24 January 2013 (aged 53)
- Place of death: Surabaya, Indonesia
- Position: Defender

Youth career
- TJ Dynamo České Budějovice

Senior career*
Years	Team	Apps	(Gls)
1977–1988	Slavia Prague	201	(5)
1988–1990	Bohemians Prague	35	(0)
1990–1992	Sabah		
1992–1993	Bohemians Prague	4	(0)

Managerial career
- 2002: Most
- 2003: Persigo
- 2003–2005: PSM
- 2005–2006: Slavia Prague (assistant coach)
- 2007: Arema
- 2008–2010: Slavia Prague (youth coach)
- 2010–2011: Arema
- 2011–2012: Persela
- 2012–2013: Bhayangkara F.C.
- * Club domestic league appearances and goals

Miroslav Janů (8 November 1959 – 24 January 2013) was a Czech football defender and later manager. As a player, he played a total of 240 matches in the Czechoslovak First League, scoring five times.

== Playing career ==
Janů started his football career as a youth player at TJ Dynamo České Budějovice, before moving to Slavia Prague at the age of 17. He played 201 matches for Slavia in an 11-year spell. He went on to play for Bohemians Prague for two years before heading to Malaysia. In the 1992–93 season he returned to Czechoslovakia, playing four more games for Bohemians. He finished his career with a total of 240 games in the Czechoslovak First League, having scored five goals.

He played for the Czechoslovakia Olympic football team in some qualification matches for the 1988 Summer Olympics but the team didn't qualify for the tournament.

== Management career ==
In May 2002, Janů was appointed as manager of Czech 2. Liga side Most, replacing Luboš Urban. He was given the position until the end of the season, with five games remaining.

Janů was appointed as assistant manager to Karel Jarolím at Slavia Prague in April 2005. He left Slavia and moved to Indonesia in October 2006 to become the manager of Arema FC.

His coaching adventure in Indonesia started in Persigo and then PSM. He led PSM to second place in the 2004 Liga Indonesia Premier Division. He joined Arema for a second time in the 2010–11 season, replacing Dutchman Robert Alberts. Arema finished the season in second place.

== Death ==
He died in Surabaya, Indonesia on 24 January 2013 from a suspected heart attack.
