= Zulqarnain Haider =

Zulqarnain Haider may refer to:

- Zulqarnain Haider (cricketer)
- Zulqarnain Haider (actor)
