= Putra Samarinda F.C. =

Football club in Samarinda, Indonesia

Putra Samarinda
- Full name: Putra Samarinda Football Club
- Nickname: Pesut Mahakam (Mahakam dolphin)
- Short name: Pusam
- Founded: 1989; 37 years ago
- Dissolved: 2014 (became Bali United)
- Ground: Palaran Stadium (2014); For others see below
- Final season; 2014: Indonesia Super League, 6th in East Region
Home colours	Away colours

Putra Samarinda Football Club was an Indonesian football club located in Samarinda, East Kalimantan. Nicknamed Pesut Mahakam, they won the Liga Indonesia Premier Division title in the 2008–09 season.

== History ==
=== Early years (1989–2003) ===
The club was formed in 1989 as Putra Samarinda Football Club, or often called Pusam, by a local businessman, Harbiansyah Hanafiah, to compete in semi-professional competition Galatama. But when the top two competitions in Indonesia, Perserikatan and Galatama, merged to form Liga Indonesia, Pusam suffered a financial crisis throughout the time. In 2000, they were forced to withdraw from the Premier Division and were sentenced to drop to First Division. The following season they were also absent so they were again sentenced to go down to Second Division.

=== Merge with Persisam (2003–2014) ===
Besides Pusam, there was one more club in Samarinda which was a former Perserikatan team, Persatuan Sepakbola Indonesia Samarinda, or commonly known as Persisam. Persisam, unlike Pusam, did not experience financial problems because at that time they received financial assistance from the city government of Samarinda. Unfortunately, their achievements were not so good. Even to the point of being relegated into the second division in 2002–03 season. The two teams then decided to merge in 2003 and formed Persisam Putra Samarinda. By obtained funding sources from the Samarinda City Regional Budget (APBD Samarinda) and Pusam's license to compete in Liga Indonesia, they started from the second division.

The club's achievements after the merger was slowly skyrocketed. Entering the second round of the Second Division in the 2005 season, they were automatically promoted to First Division. Two seasons in the third-tier of Indonesian football competition, Persisam Putra rose to the Premier Division in the 2008–09 season and immediately kicked off by becoming champions. They were promoted to the Indonesia Super League.

Entering the 2014 season, Harbiansyah Hanafiah renamed the club back to Putra Samarinda which aimed to revive the glory of Putra Samarinda which was replaced by Persisam. Unfortunately, the club was like being abandoned by fans because there was an issue stating that Pusam was then used as political land. The discourse was also opposed by internal club members so that there was a split in club management. In addition, the club was shocked because of the corruption cases carried out by a number of their officials.

=== Relocation and renaming ===
To improve their marketability and higher chance of success, Putra Samarinda was relocated from Samarinda, East Kalimantan to Gianyar, Bali. Harbiansyah Hanafiah, the main commissioner of Putra Samarinda explained that he was willing to change the name of the club and relocated to Bali because there were no representative of Bali in the highest football tier in Indonesia. Moreover, Pusam's previous financial condition was very apprehensive. So, after cooperating with one of the tire manufacturers, Corsa, he hoped that the club would not be dissolved.

The club were brought out of administration at the end of the 2014 season, and subsequently renamed "Bali United".

== Colours and badge ==
Putra Samarinda have played in orange shirts, even when the club was named Persisam Putra Samarinda.

Pusam's official emblem has undergone several changes, following the merger. When merging with Persisam, the emblem used has a round shape, adorned with Persisam Putra Samarinda text in two colors (red and black) and two stars that flank an eagle that flaps its wings which bring out the nickname Elang Borneo (Borneo Eagle). Then, irrawaddy dolphin logo appears for the first time when Persisam competed in the 2011–12 Indonesia Super League. Previously, the irrawaddy dolphin was more familiar as the Putra Samarinda logo when competed in Galatama. A dark-and-bright orange shield with two dolphins flanking a ball. At the bottom, there was the writing of Persisam Putra (Putra Samarinda in 2014) and Dayak typical carvings at the top of the logo, gave them the nickname Pesut Mahakam (Mahakam Dolphin).

== Stadium ==
From 1989 until the first half of 2014 season, Pusam contested their home matches at Segiri Stadium, although in very rare circumstances the club played some home games in Sempaja Stadium. They also used Sempaja as their primary training ground.

In March 2014, Pusam officially moved to Palaran, built for the 2008 Indonesia National Games, for the rest of 2014 season in the hope of increasing revenue from ticket sales that are not in line with expectations when competed in the Segiri.

== Supporters ==
Pusam's supporter was called Pusamania, stands for Putra Samarinda Mania, based in Samarinda. But because politics entered the club, fans were disappointed and switched their allegiance to support Pusamania Borneo.

== Kit manufacturers and sponsors ==
Period	Kit manufacturer	Shirt sponsor(s)
1989–2009	Unknown	Unknown
2009–2010	Lotto	None
2010–2011	Lotto	Bank Kaltim
2011–2012	Lotto	Bank Kaltim, Elty
2013	Bold	Bank Kaltim, Extra Joss
2014	Joma	Bank Kaltim, Extra Joss, Bosowa Asuransi

== First team squad ==
The squad given here was made up of the players registered to the club for 2014 Indonesia Super League. Updated January 2014.

Note: Flags indicate national team as defined under FIFA eligibility rules; some limited exceptions apply. Players may hold more than one non-FIFA nationality.

No.	Pos.	Nation	Player
1	GK	IDN	Dwi Kuswanto
2	DF	IDN	Wahyu Kristanto
3	DF	IDN	Mari Siswanto
4	DF	SYR	Naser Al Sebai
5	DF	IDN	Indra Permana
7	MF	IDN	Rahel Radiansyah
9	MF	IRI	Ebrahim Loveinian
11	DF	IDN	Yusar Fandy
12	FW	IDN	Lerby Eliandry
14	FW	IDN	Fadil Sausu
15	DF	IDN	Imam Baihaqi
16	DF	IDN	Muhammad Roby (captain)
17	MF	IDN	Joko Sasongko

No.	Pos.	Nation	Player
19	MF	IDN	Fajar Legian
20	FW	UZB	Pavel Solomin
21	MF	IDN	Sandi Sute
22	MF	IDN	Sultan Samma
23	MF	IDN	Bayu Gatra
25	FW	IDN	Aldaier Makatindu
33	GK	IDN	Rivky Mokodompit
45	DF	IDN	Erik Setiawan
47	GK	IDN	Muhammad Ramdani
77	MF	IDN	Loudry Setiawan
79	DF	IDN	Rio Ramandika
87	FW	MNE	Ilija Spasojević

== Head coaches ==
Years	Name	Notes
1989–2008	Unknown	
2008–2009	(Indonesia) Eddy Simon Badawi	
2009–2010	(Indonesia) Aji Santoso	
2010–2011	(Indonesia) Hendri Susilo	
2011–2012	(Indonesia) Daniel Roekito	
2012	(Indonesia) Hendri Susilo	Caretaker
2012	(Serbia) Misha Radovic	
2013–2014	(Indonesia) Mundari Karya	
2014	(Indonesia) Nil Maizar	

== Honours ==
=== Domestic ===
- **Liga Indonesia Premier Division**
  - Winners (1): 2008–09

=== Invitational ===
- **Inter Island Cup**
  - Runners-up (2): 2011, 2012

== Season by season record ==
1st or Winners 2nd or Runner-up 3rd place Promotion Relegation

Season	League									Piala Indonesia	Top goalscorer(s)	
Season	Division	Pld	W	D	L	F	A	Pts	Pos	Piala Indonesia	Name	Goals
1994–95	Premier Division	32	11	8	13	32	41	41	11th East Div			
1995–96	Premier Division	33	14	7	12	46	46	49	4th Group A			
1996–97	Premier Division	20	10	2	8	28	28	32	5th East Div			
1997–98	Premier Division	15	6	4	5	11	15	22	4th East Div (Note: The season was stopped on 25 May 1998 by the Commander Chief of the Armed Forces due to chaos in the country.)			
1998–99	Premier Division	10	4	0	6	14	15	12	4th East Div			
1999–2000	Premier Division	26	8	4	14	28	42	28	11th East Div			
2001	Premier Division	13	4	2	7	13	21	14	14th East Div (Note: Putra Samarinda withdrew after playing 22 matches; the results of their matches from the 2nd half of the season were annulled.)		(Indonesia) Yance Katehokang	7
2002	First Division	6	1	2	3	8	14	5	4th Group B (Note: All teams in the first stage Group 1 were play 12 games each, but remaining results were unknown.)			
2003	First Division	12	1	2	9	4	15	5	6th Group D			
2004	Second Division	4	2	1	1	3	2	7	3rd Group G		(Indonesia) Emil	2
2005	Second Division	9	4	2	3	16	11	14	N/K Group 1 (Note: Remaining results were unknown. Persisam Putra Samarinda didn't qualify to the final nor third place play-off. But they were promoted.)	Did not participate	(Indonesia) Yance Katehokang	5
2006	First Division	16	4	3	9	19	33	15	8th Region IV	First round	(Liberia) Henry Gobah	6
2007	First Division	16	9	0	7	33	20	27	3rd Region IV	Withdrew		
2008–09	Premier Division	33	21	8	4	66	27	71	**Winners**	Did not participate	(Paraguay) Aldo Barreto	14
2009–10	Super League	34	12	8	14	38	41	44	12th	Round of 16	(Thailand) Pipat Thonkanya	19
2010–11	Super League	28	13	3	12	39	45	42	6th	Not held	(Chile) Julio Lopez	13
2011–12	Super League	34	12	7	15	44	42	43	11th	Not held	(Indonesia) Cristian Gonzáles	18
2013	Super League	34	14	8	12	59	51	50	7th	Not held	(Ivory Coast) Lanciné Koné	19
2014	Super League	20	6	7	7	29	22	25	6th East Region	Not held	(Montenegro) Ilija Spasojević	10
