= Daniell Zeleny =

Australian soccer player (born 1988)

Daniell Zelený
Personal information
- Full name: Daniell Carl Zelený
- Date of birth: 19 October 1988 (age 38)
- Place of birth: Sydney, Australia
- Height: 1.85 m (6 ft 1 in)
- Positions: Center back; defensive midfielder

Team information
- Current team: St George

Youth career
- Sutherland Sharks
- PCYC Parramatta

Senior career*
Years	Team	Apps	(Gls)
2009–2010	Fraser Park	42	(5)
2010	Sydney Olympic	5	(0)
2011	Bankstown City Lions	11	(2)
2011–2012	Mohun Bagan	14	(0)
2012	Gresik United	21	(4)
2013	Kaya FC	11	(0)
2014	Churchill Brothers	22	(0)
2015–	St George	21	(0)
- * Club domestic league appearances and goals as of 25 September 2015

Daniell Zelený (born 19 October 1988) is an Australian soccer player who plays as a defender for Churchill Brothers SC in India.

== Career ==
Zelený started his youth career at Sutherland Sharks, before moving onto PCYC Parramatta, as well as NSW Super League club Fraser Park, before signing with National Premier Leagues NSW club Sydney Olympic.

In November 2011, it was announced Zelený had travelled to India, and signed with I-League club Mohun Bagan A.C. for the 2011–12 I-League season, replacing fellow Australian and former A-League player Simon Storey.

Zelený made his debut for Mohun Bagan A.C. in the East Bengal derby against Kingfisher East Bengal F.C. in front of 100 000 spectators. Zelený received widespread praise for his good performance in his first game for Mohun Bagan A.C., and would remain as a cult figure against Kingfisher East Bengal F.C. for the remainder of his tenure at Mohun Bagan A.C., earning the moniker of "Mr. Derby" amongst the supporters for his impressive performances against fiercest rivals Kingfisher East Bengal F.C.

In March 2012, Zelený signed for Gresik United in the Indonesia Super League.

Zelený moved to Kaya F.C. in the UFL Division 1 for the 2013 season, under the tutelage of fellow Australian, David Perkovic. On 11 April 2013, Zelený added to his reputation of being a "big-game player", as Kaya F.C. defeated rivals Global F.C. in a memorable game, that saw Kaya F.C. fight back from being 2–0 down, to win 3–2. This marked Kaya F.C.'s first win against Global F.C. in the club's history, and the first time Global F.C. had lost, since February 2012. On 13 June 2013, Zelený and Kaya repeated the same feat against Global F.C., coming from two goals behind to win the game 3–2. In doing so, Kaya ended Global's hopes of winning the UFL Championship, and became the only team in the competition to successfully defeat Global in both home and away games. Zelený ended the season having not lost a game whilst playing for Kaya F.C.

Churchill Brothers SC completed their foreign quota by signing Zelený from Kaya F.C. Churchill Brothers would go on to qualify for the knockout stages of the AFC Cup for the first time in their history, and also finished the season as Federation Cup champions.
