= Mundari Karya =

Indonesian football manager

Personal information
- Full name: Mundari Karya
- Date of birth: 1 October 1959 (age 67)
- Place of birth: Pekanbaru, Indonesia

Managerial career
- Years: Team
- 2001: Barito Putera
- 2006–2007: Persikota Tangerang
- 2009–2010: Persih Tembilahan
- 2011–2013: PSPS Pekanbaru
- 2013–2014: Persisam Samarinda
- 2016: Barito Putera
- 2026–: Isenmulang Kalteng F.C.

Mundari Karya (born 1 October 1959) is an Indonesian football manager who formerly managed his hometown's team PSPS Pekanbaru.

He is known for developing talent in young footballers, such as the Malian footballer Makan Konate who was brought by Mundari to Indonesia at a young age.

From 2020 to 2026, Mundari was the team manager of Liga 1 club PS Barito Putera,having been the head coach of the same club in 2016. He was appointed head coach of Isenmulang Kalteng F.C., a newly promoted club for 2026–27 Indonesian Super League.
