= Kubay Quaiyan =

Liberian footballer

Personal information
- Full name: Kubay Quaiyan
- Date of birth: July 10, 1982 (age 44)
- Place of birth: Monrovia, Liberia
- Height: 1.80 m (5 ft 11 in)
- Position: Defender

Senior career*
Years	Team	Apps	(Gls)
2007–2008	PSSB Bireuen	23	(1)
2008–2009	Semen Padang	22	(1)
2009–2015	Persiram Raja Ampat	96	(3)

International career
2008–2014	Liberia	8	(0)
- * Club domestic league appearances and goals as of 08:07, 8 January 2015 (UTC)

Kubay Quaiyan (born July 10, 1982) is a Liberian former footballer.
