= Gustavo Chena =

Argentine footballer

Personal information
- Full name: Gustavo Roberto Chena
- Date of birth: 16 August 1982 (age 44)
- Place of birth: Santa Fe, Argentina
- Height: 1.80 m (5 ft 11 in)
- Position: Midfielder

Youth career
- Boca Juniors

Senior career*
Years	Team	Apps	(Gls)
2002–2003	Boca Juniors	6	(0)
2003–2005	Persija Jakarta	50	(18)
2005–2006	Club Atletico Belgrano	14	(0)
2006–2007	Persebaya Surabaya	24	(2)
2008	PSMS Medan	20	(6)
2008–2009	Selangor FC	24	(18)
2009–2010	Deltras Sidoarjo	30	(4)
2010–2011	PSIS Semarang	36	(6)
2011–2014	Gresik United	70	(20)
2014–2018	Persija Jakarta	90	(28)
Total		364	(102)
- * Club domestic league appearances and goals

Gustavo Roberto Chena (born 16 August 1982) is a former Argentine footballer who played as a midfielder. A graduate of the Boca Juniors academy, he spent the majority of his career in Indonesia.

== Honours ==
PSMS Medan

- Liga Indonesia Premier Division runner up: 2007–08
