= Dedy Gusmawan =

Indonesian footballer

Personal information
- Full name: Dedy Gusmawan
- Date of birth: 27 December 1985 (age 40)
- Place of birth: Tanjung Morawa, Indonesia
- Height: 1.78 m (5 ft 10 in)
- Position: Defender

Senior career*
Years	Team	Apps	(Gls)
2005–2008	PSDS Deli Serdang	38	(0)
2008–2012	PSPS Pekanbaru	107	(0)
2013–2015	Mitra Kukar	51	(1)
2015–2016	Zeyar Shwe Myay	36	(2)
2016–2018	Mitra Kukar	40	(1)
2019	Semen Padang	29	(1)
2020–2021	PSM Makassar	0	(0)
2020	→ Sulut United (loan)	0	(0)
2021	Semen Padang	10	(1)
2022	Persita Tangerang	15	(0)
2022–2023	PSS Sleman	12	(0)
2023–2024	Malut United	3	(0)
Total		341	(7)

International career
2014–2016	Indonesia	2	(0)

Managerial career
- 2024–: Malut United (assistant)
- * Club domestic league appearances and goals

Dedy Gusmawan (born 27 December 1985) is an Indonesian former professional footballer who played as a defender.

== International career ==
Dedi won his first cap for Indonesia in a friendly match against Cambodia on 25 September 2014, where he played as a substitute.

== Career statistics ==
=== International appearances ===
Indonesia national team
Year	Apps	Goals
2014	1	0
2015	0	0
2016	1	0
Total	2	0

== Honours ==
Malut United

- Liga 2 third place (play-offs): 2023–24
