= Seme Pattrick =

Cameroonian footballer

Semé Pattrick
Personal information
- Full name: Semé Pierre Pattrick
- Date of birth: 2 February 1981 (age 45)
- Place of birth: Douala, Cameroon
- Height: 1.86 m (6 ft 1 in)
- Position: Defender

Senior career*
Years	Team	Apps	(Gls)
1997–1998	Dynamo Douala		
1999–2000	Cotonsport Garoua		
2001–2002	Caïman Douala		
2003–2004	Racing Bafoussam		
2005–2006	Cotonsport Garoua		
2007–2008	Persikabo Bogor	29	(6)
2008–2011	Persema Malang	58	(6)
2011–2012	Arema Indonesia (ISL)	32	(5)
2012–2013	Persiram Raja Ampat	14	(1)
2014–2015	Perseru Serui	18	(1)
- * Club domestic league appearances and goals

Semé Pierre Pattrick (born 2 February 1981) is a Cameroonian former footballer who plays as a defender.

== Honours ==
=== Club ===
Dynamo Douala

- Cameroonian Cup: 1998

Cotonsport Garoua

- Championnat du Cameroun de football: 2005, 2006

Persema Malang

- Liga Indonesia Premier Division runner up: 2008–09

=== International ===
Cameroon

- CEMAC Cup: 2005
