= Greg Nwokolo =

Indonesian footballer

Personal information
- Full name: Gregory Junior Nwokolo
- Date of birth: 3 January 1986 (age 40)
- Place of birth: Onitsha, Nigeria
- Height: 1.75 m (5 ft 9 in)
- Position: Forward

Senior career*
Years	Team	Apps	(Gls)
2003–2004	Tampines Rovers	19	(9)
2004–2005	Sriwijaya	20	(7)
2005	Young Lions	13	(4)
2005	Warriors	12	(3)
2006	PSIS Semarang	18	(11)
2006–2007	PSMS Medan	17	(2)
2007–2008	Persis Solo	28	(14)
2008–2009	Persija Jakarta	31	(16)
2009–2010	Olhanense	13	(0)
2010–2011	Persija Jakarta	26	(13)
2011–2012	Pelita Jaya	24	(20)
2012	→ Chiangrai United (loan)	9	(5)
2012–2013	Arema Cronus	24	(15)
2013–2014	Persebaya DU	24	(14)
2014–2015	Persija Jakarta	2	(1)
2015–2016	BEC Tero Sasana	19	(5)
2016	Persija Jakarta	14	(3)
2017–2020	Madura United	75	(22)
2021–2022	Madura United	7	(1)
2023–2024	Arema	10	(0)
Total		405	(165)

International career
2013–2019	Indonesia	8	(2)
- * Club domestic league appearances and goals

Gregory Junior Nwokolo (born 3 January 1986) is a former footballer who played as a forward. Born in the Nigeria, he represents the Indonesia national team.

== Club career ==
Greg began his career in Asia with Tampines Rovers. After that, in 2004 he signed for Young Lions. He left them in the same year to move to the Indonesian club, Persijatim Solo. After half a year in Indonesia for Persijatim, he joined Singapore Armed Forces in January 2005 and signed back to PSIS Semarang in early 2006.

After a year and a half, in mid-2006 he joined PSMS Medan. He played for PSMS Medan one year before being signed in January 2007 for Persis Solo, after 14 goals in 28 games in the 2007–08 season was sold to Persija Jakarta.

In 2009, he left the club, Persija Jakarta and he want to seek his fortune in Europe and signed for the Portuguese club, Olhanense until 30 June 2010, in August 2010 before he moved back to Persija Jakarta as a free agent.

In the 2011–12 season, he was recruited by Pelita Jaya together with Safee Sali and Aleksandar Bajevski. After that, Greg moved to Arema Indonesia for the 2012–13 season.

On 5 December 2014, he signed again with Persija Jakarta.

== International career ==
As a Nigerian, Nwokolo does not have any record that he has been capped in any match for both junior or senior for the Nigeria National Football Team. In early 2010, Nwokolo was rumoured that he will soon play for the Indonesia national football team, though this rumour wasn't confirmed by Nwokolo himself, what is interesting is that he didn't confirm nor deny the rumour. After many speculations, in August 2011 Football Association of Indonesia finally confirmed that Nwokolo has been naturalised, and got Indonesian citizenship officially on 10 October 2011.

Nwokolo made his debut for the Indonesia national football team in the 2015 AFC Asian Cup qualification campaign against Saudi Arabia on 23 March 2013. Nwokolo also played full 90 minutes in a friendly match against Netherlands on 7 June 2013. On 14 August 2013, Nwokolo scored his first international goal against Philippines in a friendly match.

== Personal life ==
On 20 May 2018, he married Indonesian model and actress Kimmy Jayanti, in Perth, Australia.

== Controversies ==
On 15 April 2014, after the Persipura Jayapura vs Persebaya Bhayangkara match conference, Greg got into a fight with Jacksen F. Tiago because of personal problems that started in the Indonesia national football team. The situation then eased after police restrained both of them.

== Career statistics ==
=== International ===
Indonesia national team
Year	Apps	Goals
2013	4	1
2014	2	0
2015	0	0
2016	0	0
2017	0	0
2018	0	0
2019	2	1
Total	8	2

=== International goals ===
Scores and results list Indonesia's goal tally first.

No.	Date	Venue	Opponent	Score	Result	Competition
1.	14 August 2013	Manahan Stadium, Surakarta, Indonesia	Philippines	1–0	2–0	Friendly
2.	25 March 2019	Mandalar Thiri Stadium, Mandalay, Myanmar	Myanmar	1–0	2–0	Friendly

== Honours ==
Tampines Rovers

- S.League: 2004
- Singapore Cup: 2004

== See also ==
- List of Indonesia international footballers born outside Indonesia
