= Gomes de Oliveira =

Brazilian footballer and manager (born 1962)

Personal information
- Full name: Wesley Gomes de Oliveira
- Date of birth: 1 December 1962 (age 63)
- Place of birth: Brazil
- Position: Striker

Senior career*
Years	Team	Apps	(Gls)
1994–1996	Mitra Surabaya		

Managerial career
- 2007–2009: Persebaya Youth
- 2010: Persebaya Surabaya (assistant coach)
- 2010–2011: Perseru Serui
- 2011–2012: Persiwa Wamena
- 2012–2013: Persela Lamongan
- 2013–2014: Persiram Raja Ampat
- 2016–2018: Madura United
- 2019: Kalteng Putra
- 2020: PSMS Medan
- 2022–2023: Gresik United
- 2024: Bhayangkara
- * Club domestic league appearances and goals

Wesley Gomes de Oliveira (born 1 December 1962) is a Brazilian former footballer and manager.

== Career ==
Gomes de Oliveira started his career with Persebaya U-21.
