= Bankaltimtara =

Indonesian regional development bank

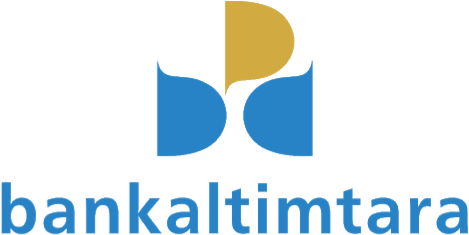
- Formerly: Perusahaan Daerah Bank Pembangunan Daerah Kalimantan Timur (Regional Company of East Kalimantan Region Development Bank)
- Type: Public Company, Municipally owned corporation
- Industry: Financial services, banking
- Founded: 14 October 1965
- Founder: East Kalimantan Provincial Government
- Headquarters: Samarinda, East Kalimantan, Indonesia
- Number of locations: ▲276 branches (2018)
- Area served: East Kalimantan, Indonesia; North Kalimantan, Indonesia; Jakarta, Indonesia
- Key people: Sulaiman Gafur; Muhammad Yamin
- Revenue: ▼ Rp2,526,627,000 (2018); ▲ Rp2,904,586,000 (2017)
- Net income: ▼ Rp443,690,000 (2018); ▼ Rp465,307,000 (2017)
- Total assets: ▼ Rp25,344,194,000 (2018); ▲ Rp22,696,975,000 (2017)
- Total equity: ▼ Rp3,874,773,000 (2018); ▲ Rp4,514,786,000 (2017)
- Owner: Government of East Kalimantan; Government of North Kalimantan; Government of cities and regencies of East Kalimantan and North Kalimantan
- Number of employees: ▲2,176 (2018)
- Subsidiaries: PT BPR Pembangunan Kutai Timur; PT BPR Kutai Sejahtera
- Website: www.bankaltimtara.co.id

PT Bank Pembangunan Daerah Kalimantan Timur dan Kalimantan Utara (lit. 'Regional Development Bank of East Kalimantan and North Kalimantan'), doing business as Bankaltimtara, is an Indonesian regional development bank serving East Kalimantan and North Kalimantan. It was previously known as Bank Kaltim or East Kalimantan Bank until 2017 when the company was renamed after North Kalimantan was created five years ago. It is also one of the biggest compared to other province's regional development banks in Indonesia.

== History ==
The company was established by Regional Law Number 3 of 1964. As of 2018, 37% of the bank shares are owned by East Kalimantan provincial government, while the rest is distributed to government of regencies and cities in East and North Kalimantan province. As with other regional development banks in Indonesia, its commissioner is appointed directly by provincial government serving 4 years-term and managed by regional provincial laws.
