= Daniel Roekito =

Indonesian football manager (born 1952)

Personal information
- Date of birth: 19 May 1952 (age 74)
- Place of birth: Rembang, Indonesia

Managerial career
- Years: Team
- 1994–1996: Barito Putera
- 1996–1997: PKT
- 2000–2001: Barito Putera
- 2001–2002: Arema Indonesia
- 2002–2003: PSIS
- 2003–2005: PSS
- 2005–2008: Persik Kediri
- 2008–2010: Persiba Balikpapan
- 2010–2011: Persib Bandung
- 2011–2012: Putra Samarinda
- 2012: Persepam Pamekasan
- 2017–2018: Persibat Batang

Daniel Roekito (born 19 May 1952 in Rembang Regency, Central Java, Indonesia) is an Indonesian football manager who has coached several teams. His career highlights have included leading Barito Putera become semifinalists in 1994/95 Liga Indonesia and bringing the Indonesian championship to Persik Kediri in 2006.

In November 2010, he took the reins at Persib Bandung in the Indonesia Super League. In 2014, he left Persepam Madura Utama United.

== Honours ==
Persik Kediri

- Liga Indonesia Premier Division: 2006
