= Subangkit =

Indonesian football coach

Personal information
- Full name: Subangkit
- Date of birth: 29 November 1959 (age 66)
- Place of birth: Pasuruan, Indonesia
- Height: 1.78 m (5 ft 10 in)
- Position: Defender

Senior career*
Years	Team	Apps	(Gls)
1978	Persekap Pasuruan		
1979–1983	Assyabaab Surabaya		
1984	NIAC Mitra		
1985	Suryanaga		
1986–1992	Persebaya Surabaya		

International career
- Indonesia

Managerial career
- Persekabpas
- Persiku Persema
- 2010–2012: Persela Lamongan Bhayangkara F.C.
- 2013: Persiwa Wamena Sriwijaya F.C. U-21
- 2014: Sriwijaya
- 2016: Mitra Kukar
- 2017–18: PSIS Semarang
- 2018–2020: Sriwijaya
- 2021: Bekasi City (Head coach of youth team)
- 2022: Gresik United
- * Club domestic league appearances and goals

Subangkit (born 29 November 1959) is an Indonesian professional football coach and former player.

== Head coaching career ==
He managed several clubs during his career as a head coach.
