= Abdul Rahman Gurning =

Indonesian footballer and manager

Abdul Rahman
Personal information
- Full name: Abdul Rahman Gurning
- Date of birth: 15 January 1958 (age 68)
- Place of birth: Asahan Regency, North Sumatra, Indonesia
- Positions: Midfielder; defender

Youth career
- PSSA Asahan

Senior career*
Years	Team	Apps	(Gls)
1976–1978	PSSA Asahan		
1974–1980	PSS Simalungun		
1980–1984	Mercu Buana		
1985–1988	PSMS Medan		
1989–1990	Pusri		
1990–1995	Medan Jaya		
1995–1996	Harimau Tapanuli		
1996–1997	Medan Jaya		

International career
1981–1985	PON North Sumatra		
1986	Indonesia		

Managerial career
- 1997–1999: Medan Jaya
- 2000–2001: PSSA Asahan
- 2001–2002: PSMS Medan
- 2002–2003: PON North Sumatra
- 2003–2004: PS Palembang
- 2006–2007: Persitara North Jakarta
- 2008–2009: Persitara North Jakarta (assistant coach)
- 2009–2011: PSPS Pekanbaru
- 2011–2012: PSMS Medan
- 2012–2013: Arema IPL (assistant coach)
- 2013–2014: Gresik United
- 2016–2017: PSMS Medan
- 2019: PSMS Medan
- * Club domestic league appearances and goals

Abdul Rahman Gurning (born 15 January 1958, in Kisaran, Asahan Regency) is an Indonesian football player and, a former head coach of PSMS Medan and PSPS Pekanbaru.

== Careers ==
=== Player ===
He began his career by playing at local clubs in the Asahan, then he was recruited Kamarudin Panggabean to play in the club Mercu Buana. After the club Mercu Buana broke up, he played for the club Medan Jaya and PSMS Medan.

=== Manager ===
After retiring as a player, he turned into a football coach with a license A to train a football team. The club has ever trained is Persitara North Jakarta and PSPS Pekanbaru. After success with PSPS he was contracted by PSMS Medan but he soon resigned after a dispute with management. Then he received the proposal Arema Indonesia playing at Indonesia Premier League to be the assistant coach of the Milomir Šešlija, but with the internal problems at the club he resigned. After that he was dealing with Gresik United replace Freddy Muli, before he was sacked by the club because the team did not meet the target.

== International careers ==
He had a career for the Indonesia national football team playing the Asian Games in Seoul, South Korea in 1986. He brought Indonesia became the fourth champion in the arena.

== Coaching license ==
- S3 (1991)
- S2 (1995)
- Lisensi C (1997)
- Lisensi B (1998)
- Lisensi A (2000)
