= Suharno (footballer) =

Indonesian footballer and coach

Personal information
- Date of birth: 1 October 1959
- Place of birth: Klaten, Indonesia
- Date of death: 19 August 2015 (aged 55)
- Place of death: Malang, Indonesia

Senior career*
Years	Team	Apps	(Gls)
1978	PS Banteng		
1979–1981	PS Ragunan		
1981–1987	Perkesa 78		
1987–1990	Niac Mitra		

Managerial career
- 1988–1990: Niac Mitra (assistant)
- 1990–1996: Gelora Dewata
- 1996–1997: Arema Malang
- 1997–1999: Persikab Bandung
- 1999–2000: Persema Malang
- 2001: PSS Sleman
- 2002–2003: Deltras Sidoarjo
- 2005–2006: PKT Bontang
- 2007–2008: Persis Solo
- 2009–2010: Persiwa Wamena
- 2011–2012: Indonesia (assistant)
- 2011–2012: Arema Indonesia
- 2012–2013: Gresik United
- 2013: Persibo Bojonegoro
- 2013–2015: Arema Cronus
- * Club domestic league appearances and goals

Suharno (1 October 1959 – 19 August 2015) was an Indonesian football coach who managed Arema Cronus from November 2013 until his death in August 2015.

== Playing career ==
Suharno played 12 years as a footballer. He began his career in PS Banteng and retired after three seasons with Niac Mitra.

== Coaching career ==
=== Niac Mitra ===
Suharno began his coaching career in 1988 as player-assistant coach at Niac Mitra.

=== Gresik United ===
In August 2012 Suharno signed a contract with Gresik United before he was sacked on 28 February 2013.

=== Persibo Bojonegoro ===
On 27 July 2013, Suharno agreed to join Persibo Bojonegoro as a coach.

== Death ==
Suharno died on 19 August 2015, in Puskesmas Pakisaji, Malang. The cause of the death was because of a heart attack, after a training session at the Kanjuruhan Stadium.

== Managerial statistics ==
Team	Nat	From	To	Record				
Team	Nat	From	To	G	W	D	L	Win %
Arema Cronus	(Indonesia)	26 November 2013	19 August 2015	36	21	8	7	58.33
Total				36	21	8	7	58.33

== Honours ==
=== Player ===
Niac Mitra

- Galatama: 1987–88

=== Manager ===
Gelora Dewata

- Piala Galatama: 1994

Arema Cronus

- East Java Governor Cup: 2013
- Indonesian Inter Island Cup: 2014/15
