= Jaya Hartono =

Indonesian football coach

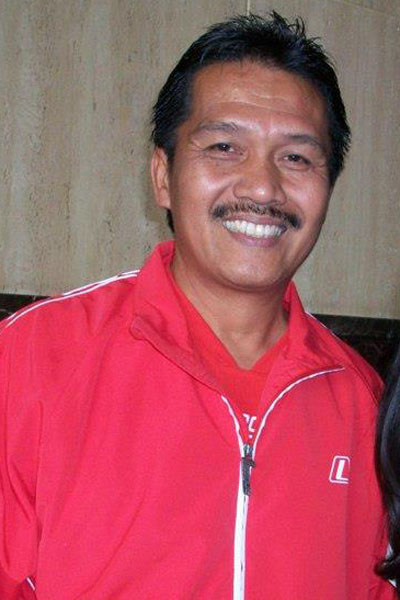
- Hartono in 2011

Personal information
- Full name: Jaya Hartono
- Date of birth: 20 October 1963 (age 63)
- Place of birth: Medan, Indonesia
- Height: 1.73 m (5 ft 8 in)

Team information
- Current team: Persiraja Banda Aceh (Head coach)

Youth career
- 1978: Bintang Selatan Medan
- 1979: Bintang Utara Medan

Senior career*
| Years | Team | Apps | (Gls) |
| 1982 | PSMS Medan | | |
| 1984−1990 | Mitra Surabaya | | |
| 1990−1991 | Gresik United | | |
| 1991−1993 | BPD Jateng | | |
| 1993−1996 | Assyabab | | |
| 1997 | PKT Bontang | | |
| 1998 | Persisam | | |
| 2000 | Persik Kediri | | |

International career
| 1986–1996 | Indonesia | 29 | (1) |

Managerial career
- 2000–2001: Arema Indonesia (Assistant coach)
- 2001–2004: Persik Kediri
- 2004–2005: Persiba Balikpapan
- 2005–2008: Deltras Sidoarjo
- 2008–2010: Persib Bandung
- 2010–2012: Persik Kediri
- 2012–2013: Persiram Raja Ampat
- 2013–2014: Persiba Balikpapan
- 2016–2017: Sragen FC
- 2019: Perserang Serang
- 2019–2021: PSCS Cilacap
- 2021: Persijap Jepara
- 2022: Persak Kebumen (Technical director)
- 2022–2024: Sulut United
- 2026–: Persiraja Banda Aceh
Medal record
Men's football
Representing Indonesia
Southeast Asian Games
| Gold medal – first place | 1987 Indonesia | Team |
- * Club domestic league appearances and goals

Jaya Hartono (born 20 October 1963 in Medan, North Sumatera) is a football coach from Indonesia. He coached Persib Bandung from 2008 to 2010. He previously served as coach at Deltras Sidoarjo. He played football on clubs and the national team.

== Playing career ==
He played at the Galatama competition in the 1980s. He played on championship team Niac Mitra in 1987 and runner-up in 1989. He finished his career at Persik Kediri in 2000. He played for the following teams:

- Bintang Selatan Medan, 1978
- Bintang Utara Medan, 1979
- PSMS Medan, 1982
- Niac Mitra, 1984–1989
- Petrokimia Putra, 1989–1991
- BPD Jateng, 1991–1993
- Assyabaab Salim Group, 1993–1996
- Bontang FC, 1997
- Persisam Putra Samarinda, 1998
- Persik Kediri, 2000

== Managerial career ==
Jaya debuted on the national team in 1986, competing in the 1986 Asian Games. The team reached the semifinals, but were defeated by South Korea. He again played on the national team when it won the gold medal at the 1987 SEA Games and also on the Indonesia Independence Cup in 1986 with Robby Darwis.

== Honours ==
=== Player ===
Indonesia

- SEA Games gold medal: 1987

=== Manager ===
Persik Kediri

- Liga Indonesia Premier Division: 2003
- Liga Indonesia First Division: 2002
- East Java Governor's Cup: 2002, 2004
