= Mario Costas =

Argentine footballer

Personal information
- Full name: Mario Alejandro Costas
- Date of birth: 24 April 1981 (age 45)
- Place of birth: Santiago del Estero, Argentina
- Height: 1.79 m (5 ft 10 1/2 in)
- Position: Forward

Senior career*
Years	Team	Apps	(Gls)
2000−2003	Ferro Carril Oeste		
2003−2004	Sportivo Italiano		
2004	Estudiantes de Caseros		
2005	Deportivo Morón		
2005	Independiente Rivadavia		
2006	Temperley		
2006	Deportivo Merlo		
2007	Luis Ángel Firpo		(7)
2008	América de Cali	2	(0)
2008	Alvarado		
2009–2010	PSMS Medan	16	(6)
2010	Gimnasia Esgrima		
2011	Pro Titan	9	(4)
2011−2013	Persela Lamongan	32	(22)
2014	Persija Jakarta	5	(0)
2014	→ PSM Makassar (loan)	10	(3)
- * Club domestic league appearances and goals as of 27 February 2014

Mario Alejandro Costas (born April 24, 1981, in Santiago del Estero) is an Argentinian former footballer who plays as a striker.

== Honours ==
=== Club honors ===
Ferro Carril Oeste

- Primera B Metropolitana (1): 2002–03

Luis Ángel Firpo

- Primera División (1): Apertura 2007

=== Individual honors ===
- Primera División Top Scorer (1): Clausura 2007
