= Park Chul-hyung =

South Korean footballer

Park Chul-Hyung
Personal information
- Full name: Park Chul-Hyung (박철형)
- Date of birth: March 17, 1982 (age 44)
- Place of birth: Seoul, South Korea
- Height: 1.85 m (6 ft 1 in)
- Position: Central defender

Youth career
- 2001−2004: University of Ulsan

Senior career*
Years	Team	Apps	(Gls)
2004−2008	Jeju United	13	(0)
2007−2008	→ Gwangju Sangmu (military service)	4	(0)
2008−2009	Super Reds	28	(1)
2009−2010	Persema Malang	15	(1)
2010−2011	Semen Padang	28	(2)
2011−2012	PSPS Pekanbaru	18	(1)
2012−2013	Persela Lamongan	16	(2)
2013−2014	Gresik United	17	(0)
2014−2015	Mitra Kukar	18	(0)
2015−2016	UiTM F.C.	20	(0)
- * Club domestic league appearances and goals as of 17:45, 1 January 2015 (UTC)

Park Chul-Hyung (born 17 March 1982) is a South Korean former footballer who plays as a centre-back.
