= Erick Weeks Lewis =

Liberian footballer (born 1986)

Erick Lewis
Personal information
- Full name: Erick Weeks Lewis
- Date of birth: 10 March 1986 (age 40)
- Place of birth: Paynesville, Liberia
- Height: 1.73 m (5 ft 8 in)
- Position: Attacking midfielder

Senior career*
Years	Team	Apps	(Gls)
2003−2005	UMC Roots	35	(8)
2005−2006	Mighty Barrolle	18	(7)
2006−2007	Cotonsport Garoua	18	(6)
2007−2008	Renacimiento	23	(7)
2008−2012	Persiwa Wamena	115	(40)
2012−2013	Sriwijaya	18	(6)
2013−2014	Barrack Controllers	14	(2)
2014−2015	Mitra Kukar	25	(8)
2015−2016	Pusamania Borneo	14	(3)
2016	Perak TBG	11	(0)
2016−2017	Madura United	19	(3)
2017	Persib Bandung	0	(0)
Total		310	(90)

International career
2005–2015	Liberia	27	(3)
- * Club domestic league appearances and goals

Erick Weeks Lewis (born 10 March 1986) is a Liberian former footballer who played as an attacking midfielder.

== Honors ==
=== Club ===
Mighty Barrolle

- Liberian Premier League (1): 2006

Cotonsport Garoua

- Elite One (1): 2007
- Cameroonian Cup (1): 2007
