= Stefan Hansson =

Swedish football manager (born 1957)

Personal information
- Date of birth: 6 December 1957 (age 68)
- Place of birth: Svalöv, Sweden

Senior career*
Years	Team	Apps	(Gls)
1970–1977	Svalövs BK		
1977–1979	Landskrona BoIS		
1980	South Melbourne FC		
1989–1993	IFK Trelleborg		
1994–1995	Ystads IF		
1995–1996	IFK Malmö		

Managerial career
- 1982–1985: San Francisco Scots
- 1986–1988: Greek-American A.C.
- 1990–1993: IFK Trelleborg
- 1994–1995: Ystads IF
- 1995–1996: IFK Malmö
- 1997–2000: Härslövs IK
- 2001–2003: Fram FC
- 2003–2005: Køge BK
- 2005–2007: Skovlunde IF
- 2008: Sarpsborg 08 FF (assistant)
- 2010: Đồng Tâm Long An F.C.
- 2010–2011: Seychelles
- 2011: Zeyashwemye F.C.
- 2012–2014: Myanmar U23
- 2014: Mitra Kukar
- 2015: Zeyashwemye F.C.
- 2016: Persela
- 2016: Sheikh Jamal DC
- 2017: Persema Malang
- 2018 –: Älvsborg FF
- * Club domestic league appearances and goals

Stefan Hansson (born 6 December 1957) is a Swedish football manager who holds a UEFA Pro Licence.

He has worked alongside several national managers and coaches, including Stuart Baxter and Greg Reoch from England. Through these collaborations, he has been exposed to a range of coaching techniques and has developed experience working within diverse cultural contexts in the sport.

He had a great deal of success through his career winning eight league titles and one cup with different clubs in different countries as Sweden, Norway, Denmark, Seychelles, Vietnam and Myanmar. As a player, he played for several clubs in Sweden, Australia and the United States. Late in his career he also acted as player manager before becoming a full-time manager. During 2018 he will manage the Swedish third-tier side Älvsborg FF.
