= Muhammad Roby =

Indonesian footballer

Personal information
- Full name: Muhammad Roby
- Date of birth: 12 September 1985 (age 41)
- Place of birth: Jakarta, Indonesia
- Height: 1.79 m (5 ft 10 in)
- Position: Centre back

Team information
- Current team: PSCS Cilacap
- Number: 28

Youth career
- 2003–2005: Persikad Depok

Senior career*
Years	Team	Apps	(Gls)
2006–2007	Persikad Depok	12	(0)
2007–2008	Persija Jakarta	13	(0)
2008–2009	Persik Kediri	29	(1)
2009–2014	Putra Samarinda	129	(2)
2015–2017	Barito Putera	26	(0)
2017–2018	Sriwijaya	9	(0)
2018–2019	PSMS Medan	21	(0)
2019	Persita Tangerang	20	(1)
2020–2021	Persekat Tegal	1	(0)
2021	Arema	0	(0)
2021	Persiraja Banda Aceh	8	(0)
2022–2024	Persiba Balikpapan	19	(0)
2024	Dejan	2	(0)
2024–	PSCS Cilacap	11	(0)

International career
2007	Indonesia U23		
2007–2014	Indonesia	41	(1)
Medal record
Men's football
Representing Indonesia
AFF Championship
Runner-up	2010 Indonesia & Vietnam	Team
- * Club domestic league appearances and goals as of 22:10, 17 February 2025 (UTC)

Muhammad Roby (born, 12 September 1985) is an Indonesian professional footballer who plays as a centre back for Liga Nusantara club PSCS Cilacap. He competed in the 2007 Sea Games in Nakhon Ratchasima, Thailand. In 2010, he played for the Indonesia national football team for AFC Asian Cup qualifying matches.

== Club career ==
On 1 December 2014, he moved to PS Barito Putera.

== Honours ==
=== Club ===
Persita Tangerang

- Liga 2 runner-up: 2019

=== International ===
Indonesia

- Indonesian Independence Cup: 2008
- AFF Championship runner-up: 2010

=== Individual ===
- Indonesian Inter Island Cup Best Player: 2012

== International goals ==
Muhammad Roby: International goals
No.	Date	Venue	Opponent	Score	Result	Competition
1	14 August 2013	Manahan Stadium, Surakarta, Indonesia	Philippines	2–0	2–0	Friendly
