= Aji Imbut Stadium =

Stadium in East Kalimantan, Indonesia

Stadion Aji Imbut Stadion Perjiwa Stadion Tenggarong Madya
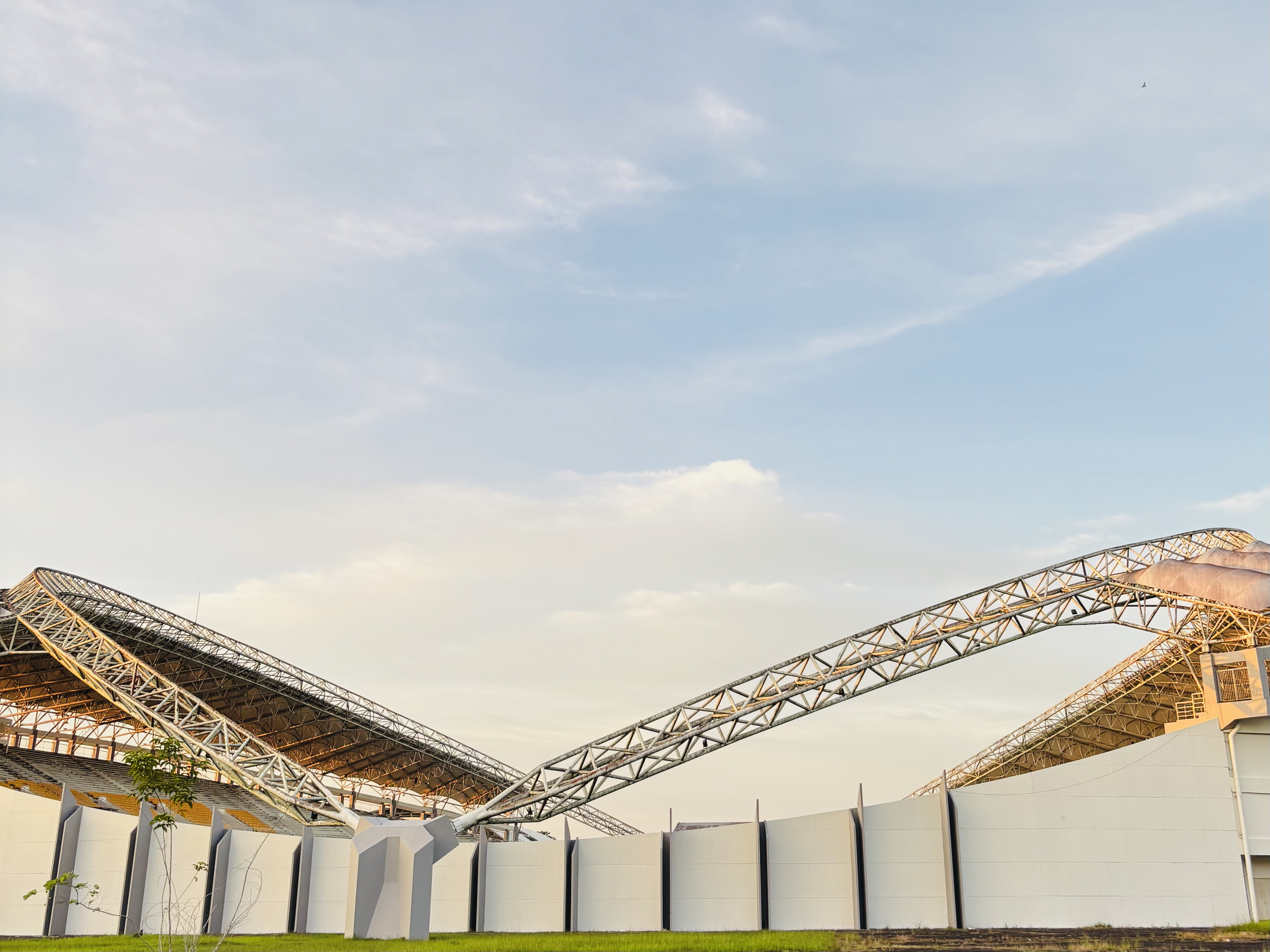
- Aji Imbut Stadium in 2026
- Interactive map of Stadion Aji Imbut; Stadion Perjiwa; Stadion Tenggarong Madya
- Location: Tenggarong, Kutai Kartanegara Regency, East Kalimantan, Indonesia
- Coordinates: 0°25′30″S 117°0′27″E
- Owner: Mitra Kukar
- Operator: Mitra Kukar
- Capacity: 35,000

Construction
- Opened: 18 June 2008

Tenant
- Mitra Kukar

Aji Imbut Stadium or Perjiwa Stadium, before the official name revealed also known as Tenggarong Madya Stadium, is a multi-purpose stadium in Tenggarong, Kutai Kartanegara Regency, East Kalimantan, Indonesia. Completed in 2008, it is mainly used mostly for football matches. The stadium has a capacity of 35,000 spectators.

== See also ==
- Lists of stadiums
- List of stadiums in Indonesia
