= List of foreign Super League (Indonesia) players =

Super League is the men's top professional football division of the Indonesian football league system from the 2008–09 season onwards. Super League was known as Liga 1 from 2017 until 2025. The following players:

1. Have played at least one Super League game for the respective club (seasons in which and teams that a player did not collect any caps in Super League for have NOT been listed).
2. Have not been capped for the Indonesia national team on any level, independently from the birthplace, except for players born in East Timor and active in the Indonesia national team before the first official match of the Timor-Leste national football team played on 21 March 2003 and players of Indonesian formation born abroad from Indonesian parents.
3. Have been born in Indonesia and were capped by a foreign national team. This includes players who have dual citizenship with Indonesia.

Players are sorted by the State, according to the FIFA eligibility rules:

1. They played for in a national team on any level. For footballers that played for two or more national teams it prevails:
  1. The one he played for on A level.
  2. The national team of birth.
2. If they never played for any national team on any level, it prevails the state of birth. For footballers born in **dissolved states** prevails the actual state of birth (e.g.: Yugoslavia —> Serbia, Montenegro, Croatia, etc.).
- National flag before the name: players who have represented their State at senior international level, winning at least one cap.
- In bold: players that played at least one Liga 1 game in the current season (2025–26), and the clubs they have played for.
- In this article, maybe there are players who are not listed, despite meeting the previously mentioned criteria.

== Naturalised players ==
- (Argentina) Esteban Vizcarra – Pelita Jaya, Semen Padang, Arema, Sriwijaya, Persib Bandung, Madura United, PSS Sleman – 2009–2024
- (Brazil) Alberto Gonçalves – Persijap Jepara, Persipura Jayapura, Arema, Sriwijaya, Madura United, PSBS Biak – 2008–2014, 2017–2025
- (Brazil) Fabiano Beltrame – Persela Lamongan, Persija Jakarta, Arema, Madura United, Persib Bandung, Persis Solo, PSBS Biak – 2008–2025
- (Brazil) Otávio Dutra – Persipura Jayapura, Gresik United, Bhayangkara, Persebaya Surabaya, Persija Jakarta, Madura United – 2013–2023
- (Cameroon) Bio Paulin – Persipura Jayapura, Sriwijaya – 2008–2018
- (Cameroon) Bruno Casimir – Persita Tangerang, Arema Indonesia – 2008–2009, 2013
- (Cameroon) Guy Junior – Persiwa Wamena, Madura United, Bhayangkara, PSM Makassar, Borneo, Barito Putera – 2013, 2016–2021
- (Cameroon) Herman Dzumafo – PSPS, Arema Indonesia, Persib, Sriwijaya, Mitra Kukar, Gresik United, Borneo, Persela, Bhayangkara – 2009–2016, 2018–2021, 2022
- (Cameroon) Mohammadou Al Hadji – Semen Padang, Barito Putera, Borneo, Sriwijaya – 2015–2019
- (Cameroon) Zoubairou Garba – Sriwijaya, TIRA-Persikabo, Persebaya Surabaya – 2008–2009, 2019–2020
- (Germany) Kim Kurniawan – Persema Malang, Pelita Bandung Raya, Persib Bandung, PSS Sleman – 2011–2025
- (Guinea) Fassawa Camara – PSM Makassar – 2014
- (Guinea) Mamadou Diallo – PSM Makassar, Persela Lamongan – 2014–15
- (Ivory Coast) Donald Bissa – PSM Makassar – 2022–2024
- (Liberia) Sackie Teah Doe – Barito Putera, Persik Kediri – 2019–2021
- (Morocco) Tarik El Janaby – PKT Bontang – 2008–2009
- (Montenegro) **Ilija Spasojević** – Mitra Kukar, Putra Samarinda, Persib Bandung, **Bhayangkara**, Bali United – 2013–15, 2017–2024, 2025–
- (Netherlands) **Diego Michiels** – Pelita Jaya, Arema Indonesia, Sriwijaya, Mitra Kukar, **Borneo Samarinda**, Arema – 2011–
- (Netherlands) **Dion Markx** - **Persib Bandung** – 2026–
- (Netherlands) **Eliano Reijnders** – **Persib Bandung** – 2025–
- (Netherlands) **Ezra Walian** – PSM Makassar, Persib Bandung, **Persik Kediri** – 2019–
- (Netherlands) **Ivar Jenner** – **Dewa United** – 2026–
- (Netherlands) **Jens Raven** – **Bali United** – 2025–
- (Netherlands) Jhon van Beukering – Pelita Jaya – 2011–2012
- (Netherlands) **Marc Klok** – PSM Makassar, Persija Jakarta, **Persib Bandung** – 2017–
- (Netherlands) **Mauro Zijlstra** - **Persija Jakarta** - 2026-
- (Netherlands) **Rafael Struick** - **Dewa United** - 2025-
- (Netherlands) Raphael Maitimo – Mitra Kukar, Sriwijaya, Persija, Persib, Arema Cronus, Madura United, Persebaya, PSM, Persita, Barito Putera – 2013–2018, 2018–2022
- (Netherlands) Ruben Wuarbanaran – Pelita Jaya, Barito Putera – 2011–2015
- (Netherlands) Sergio van Dijk – Persib Bandung – 2013–2014, 2016–2017
- (Netherlands) **Shayne Pattynama** - **Persija Jakarta** - 2026-
- (Netherlands) **Stefano Lilipaly** – Bali United, Borneo Samairinda, **Dewa United** – 2017–
- (Netherlands) **Thom Haye** - **Persib Bandung** - 2025-
- (Netherlands) Tonnie Cusell – Barito Putera – 2014
- (Nigeria) Godstime Ouseluka Egwuatu – Persipura Jayapura – 2019
- (Nigeria) Greg Nwokolo – Persija Jakarta, Pelita Jaya, Arema, Persebaya ISL, Madura United – 2008–2009, 2010–2015, 2016–2022, 2023–2024
- (Nigeria) O.K. John – Persiwa, Persik, Persebaya ISL, Mitra Kukar, Persija, Madura United, Persebaya, Kalteng Putra, Barito Putera, RANS Nusantara – 2008–2014, 2015–2016, 2018–2020, 2021–2023
- (Nigeria) Osas Saha – PSMS, Persepam MU, Persisam Putra, Persiram, Semen Padang, Perseru, Persija, TIRA-Persikabo, PSM, Bhayangkara, Persita – 2011–2021, 2022–2023
- (Nigeria) Victor Igbonefo – Persipura Jayapura, Pelita Jaya, Arema Cronus, Persib Bandung – 2008–2025
- (Paraguay) Sílvio Escobar – Persepam MU, PSM, Bali United, Perseru, Persija, PSIS, Persikabo 1973, Persiraja, Madura United – 2014–2022
- (South Korea) Lee Yu-jun – Bhayangkara, Madura United – 2016–2022
- (South Korea) Yoo Hyun-goo – Semen Padang, Sriwijaya, Kalteng Putra, Barito Putera – 2010–2020, 2022
- (Spain) **Jordi Amat** – **Persija Jakarta** – 2025–
- (Uruguay) Cristian Gonzáles – Persib Bandung, Putra Samarinda, Arema Cronus, Madura United – 2008–2018
- (Brazil) **David da Silva** – Persebaya Surabaya, Persib Bandung, **Java United** – 2018, 2019–2020, 2021–2025, 2025–
- (Brazil) **Ciro Alves** – Persib Bandung, **Java United** – 2022–2025, 2025–
- (Argentina) **Alexis Messidoro** – Persis Solo, **Dewa United Banten** – 2022–2024, 2024–
- (Japan) **Taisei Marukawa** – Persebaya Surabaya, PSIS Semarang, **Dewa United Banten** – 2021–2022, 2022–2024, 2024–
- (Japan) **Kei Hirose** – Persela Lamongan, Borneo Samarinda, **Java United** – 2019–2020, 2021–2026, 2026–
- (South Korea) **Bae Sin-yeong** – **Persita Tangerang** – 2021–2026

== Afghanistan ==
- (Afghanistan) Adam Najem – Bhayangkara – 2022–2023
- (Afghanistan) **Fareed Sadat** - **Bhayangkara** - 2025-
- (Afghanistan) Farshad Noor – Persib Bandung – 2020–2021
- (Afghanistan) Jabar Sharza – Persela Lamongan, Persiraja Banda Aceh – 2021–2022
- (Afghanistan) Taufee Skandari – PSIS Semarang – 2024

== Angola ==
- (Angola) Evandro Brandão – RANS Nusantara, PSIS Semarang – 2023–2025
- (Angola) **Kadu Monteiro** - **PSBS Biak** - 2025-

== Argentina ==
- Abel Argañaraz – PSBS Biak – 2024–2025
- Adrian Trinidad – Persiba Balikpapan – 2009–10
- Agustín Cattaneo – Persita Tangerang – 2022–23
- Alan Aciar – Persija Jakarta – 2015
- **Alexis Gómez** – **Persijap Jepara** – 2025–
- **Alexis Messidoro** – Persis Solo, **Dewa United** – 2022–
- Ariel Lucero – Arema – 2023–24
- Ariel Nahuelpán – PSBS Biak – 2025
- Carlos Sciucatti – Persijap Jepara, Persela Lamongan, Persidafon Dafonsoro, Persijap Jepara, Mitra Kukar – 2008–10, 2014–15
- Claudio Pronetto – Deltras, PSM Makassar, Gresik United – 2008–10, 2011–12
- Elías Alderete – Arema – 2020
- Esteban Herrera – Mitra Kukar – 2012–13
- Ezequiel González – Semen Padang, Persiba Bantul – 2013–14
- **Ezequiel Vidal** – Persita Tangerang, **PSIM Yogyakarta** – 2022–24, 2025–
- Facundo Aranda – Persis Solo – 2024
- Facundo Talín – PS TNI – 2017
- Felipe Cadenazzi – Borneo Samarinda – 2023–24
- Fernando Soler – Persiba Balikpapan, Borneo – 2013–15
- Franco Hita – Persela Lamongan – 2009–10
- **Franco Ramos Mingo** – **PSIM Yogyakarta** – 2025–
- Gabriel Esparza – PSBS Biak – 2024
- Gaspar Vega – Persik Kediri – 2020
- Gaston Castaño – Persiba Balikpapan, PSMS Medan, Gresik United, Pelita Bandung Raya, Persela Lamongan – 2008–15, 2018
- Gustavo Chena – Deltras, Gresik United – 2009–10, 2011–14
- Gustavo López – Persela Lamongan, Arema Cronus, PS TIRA – 2011–14, 2018
- Ian Puleio – Arema – 2025
- Jonatan Bauman – Persib Bandung, Arema – 2018–19, 2020
- Jonathan Bustos – Borneo Samarinda, PSS Sleman, Malut United – 2021–24, 2025
- Jorge Correa – Malut United – 2024
- José Sardón – Semen Padang – 2019
- Julián Velázquez – PSBS Biak – 2024–2025
- Lautaro Belleggia – Persis Solo, Bhayangkara FC – 2025
- Leonel Núñez – PS TNI – 2017
- **Luciano Guaycochea** - **Persib Bandung** - 2025-
- Marcelo Cirelli - Persebaya Surabaya, Persidafon Dafonsoro – 2009, 2011–12
- Marcelo Herrera – Bhayangkara – 2023–24
- **Marcos Astina** – **Borneo Samarinda** – 2026–
- Marcos Flores – Persib Bandung, Bali United – 2016–17
- Mariano Berriex – PS TIRA – 2018
- **Mariano Peralta** - **Borneo Samarinda** – 2024–
- Mario Barcia – Semen Padang – 2019
- Mario Costas – PSMS Medan, Persela Lamongan, Persija Jakarta, PSM Makassar – 2009–10, 2011–14
- Mateo Bustos – Persita Tangerang – 2020, 2023
- Matías Conti – Borneo – 2018–19
- Matías Córdoba – Barito Putera – 2017–18
- Pablo Francés – Persijap Jepara, Persib Bandung – 2008–11
- Paolo Frangipane – Mitra Kukar – 2012–13
- **Patricio Matricardi** - **Persib Bandung** - 2025-
- Ramiro Fergonzi – Bhayangkara, Persipura Jayapura, Persita Tangerang, Persik Kediri – 2019, 2022–2025
- Robertino Pugliara – Persija Jakarta, Persiba Balikpapan, PSM Makassar, Persipura Jayapura, Persib Bandung, Persebaya Surabaya – 2008–17, 2018
- Tiago Gaúcho - Pelita Jaya - 2008-2009

== Armenia ==
- (Armenia) **Wbeymar Angulo** – **Malut United** – 2024–

== Australia ==
- Aaron Evans – Barito Putera, PSM Makassar, PSS Sleman, Persis Solo – 2017–22
- Abu Bakar Sillah – Persepam MU – 2013–14
- Ante Bakmaz – Madura United, Persik Kediri – 2019–20
- Anthony Golec – Badak Lampung – 2019
- Aryn Williams – Persebaya Surabaya – 2019–21
- **Brandon Wilson** – **Bali United** – 2024–
- (Australia) **Bruce Djite** – PSM Makassar – 2018
- Cameron Watson – Madura United – 2017
- Charles Lokolingoy – Arema – 2023-2025
- Christopher Gómez – Persepam MU – 2013–14
- Dane Milovanović – Pelita Bandung Raya, Madura United – 2012–13, 2016–17, 2019
- Daniel Zeleny – Gresik United – 2012
- Diogo Ferreira – Persib Bandung – 2016–17
- Edemar Garcia – Arema Indonesia – 2013
- George Blackwood – Bhayangkara – 2023
- Golgol Mebrahtu – PSM Makassar – 2022
- Gustavo Girón – Arema Cronus, Persegres Gresik United – 2016–17
- Jacob Pepper – Madura United – 2020–21
- Jamie Coyne – Sriwijaya – 2012–13
- Josh Maguire – Persebaya Surabaya, PSPS Pekanbaru – 2009–11
- Kwabena Appiah – Madura United – 2023
- Michael Baird – PSM Makassar – 2014
- Matthew Mayora – Persipura Jayapura – 2009
- Nick Kalmar – Arema Cronus – 2016
- Reinaldo Elias da Costa – PSM Makassar, Persija Jakarta – 2017
- Robert Gaspar – Persiba Balikpapan, Persema Malang, Persib Bandung – 2008–2010, 2011–2012
- Sean Rooney – Deltras – 2011–12
- Srećko Mitrović – PSM Makassar, Deltras – 2010–13
- Steve Hesketh – Deltras, Arema Indonesia – 2010–12
- Troy Hearfield – Pelita Jaya – 2011

== Bahrain ==
- (Bahrain) Abdulla Yusuf Helal – Persija Jakarta – 2022–23

== Belarus ==
- Dzmitry Rekish – PS TIRA – 2018
- Sergey Pushnyakov – Persikabo 1973 – 2021–2022

== Belgium ==
- (Belgium) Radja Nainggolan – Bhayangkara – 2023–24
- Yanis Mbombo – RANS Nusantara – 2023

== Bolivia ==
- Damián Lizio – Persebaya Surabaya – 2019
- Gilbert Álvarez – Arema – 2023–24

== Bonaire ==
- **Jort van der Sande – Bali United – 2026–**

== Bosnia and Herzegovina ==
- Eldar Hasanović – Persita Tangerang – 2020
- **Kerim Palić** – **Madura United** – 2025–
- (Bosnia and Herzegovina) Muamer Svraka – Semen Padang 2016–2017
- Šerif Hasić – PSM Makassar – 2020–2021
- (Bosnia and Herzegovina) Želimir Terkeš – Persija Jakarta – 2014

== Brazil ==
- Addison Alves – Persela Lamongan, Persipura Jayapura, Persija Jakarta – 2014, 2017–2018
- Adilson Maringá – Arema, Bali United – 2021–2025
- **Alan Bernardon** - PSS Sleman, **Malut United** - 2024-
- **Alan Cardoso** - Persija Jakarta, **Bhayangkara FC** - 2025-
- Alan Henrique – Sriwijaya – 2018
- Alberto de Paula – Madura United, Perseru Serui – 2018
- Alef Santos – Bhayangkara – 2023
- Alex da Silva – PSM Makassar – 2016
- Alex Gonçalves – Persela Lamongan, TIRA-Persikabo, Persita Tangerang – 2019–2020, 2021
- **Alex Martins** – Bhayangkara, **Dewa United** – 2023–
- **Alex Tanque** - **PSM Makassar** - 2025-
- Alexsandro Santos – PSBS Biak – 2024–2025
- **Allano Lima** - **Persija Jakarta** - 2025-
- **Aloísio Neto** – **PSM Makassar** – 2024–
- Amarildo de Souza – Persijap Jepara, Persik Kediri – 2008–2010
- Anderson da Silva – Persebaya Surabaya, Mitra Kukar – 2008–2009, 2010–2012
- Anderson da Silva – Persiram Raja Ampat – 2011–2012
- Anderson Nascimento – Persik Kediri, Barito Putera – 2023–2024, 2025
- Anderson Salles – Bhayangkara – 2019, 2021–2024
- Anderson Tegao – PSMS Medan – 2008–2009
- André Ribeiro – Persipura Jayapura – 2019
- **Andrei Alba** - **Persis Solo** - 2026-
- Andrezinho – Barito Putera – 2015
- Antônio Teles – PSIS Semarang, Persiba Balikpapan – 2008–2009, 2015–2016
- **Arthur Augusto** – **Semen Padang** – 2025–
- Arthur Cunha – Mitra Kukar, Arema, Persipura Jayapura 2015–2020
- Arthur Félix – Persik Kediri – 2021–23
- Artur Vieira – Barito Putera – 2019
- **Berguinho** – Borneo Samarinda, **Persib Bandung** – 2024–
- **Betinho** – PSS Sleman, **Arema FC** 2024–
- Brendon Lucas – Persik Kediri – 2024–2025
- Bruno Cantanhede – Persib Bandung – 2022
- Bruno da Cruz - Persita Tangerang - 2024
- Bruno Dybal – Persiraja Banda Aceh, Persikabo 1973, Semen Padang – 2020, 2022-2023, 2024
- **Bruno Gomes** – Semen Padang, **Persis Solo** – 2025–
- Bruno Lopes – Persija Jakarta, Madura United – 2017, 2020, 2021
- Bruno Matos – Persija Jakarta, Bhayangkara, Madura United, Barito Putera – 2019–2021, 2022
- **Bruno Moreira** – **Persebaya Surabaya** – 2021–2022, 2023–
- **Bruno Paraiba** - **Persebaya Surabaya** - 2026-
- Bruno Silva – PSIS Semarang – 2018, 2019–2022
- Bruno Smith – Arema – 2020–2021
- **Bruno Tubarão** - **Persija Jakarta** - 2025-
- Bruno Zandonaide – Persiba Balikpapan, Persita Tangerang – 2008–2009
- Cacá Basilio – Persikabo 1973 – 2023–2024
- Caio Ruan – Arema – 2020
- Carlos Eduardo – Pelita Jaya – 2008–2010
- **Carlos Eduardo** – **Persija Jakarta** – 2024–
- **Carlos França** - **Persijap Jepara** - 2025-
- Cássio de Jesus – Semen Padang, Barito Putera – 2015–2016, 2019–2021
- Cássio Scheid - Malut United, Dewa United - 2024, 2025
- Charles Almeida – Arema – 2023–2024
- **Ciro Alves** – Persikabo 1973, Persib Bandung, **Malut United** – 2019–
- Claudir Marini – PSIS Semarang – 2019
- Clayton Silva - Persis Solo - 2026
- Cleberson Martins – Madura United, PSS Sleman – 2022–2025
- **Cleylton Santos** – Persis Solo, **Borneo FC** – 2025–
- Crislan Henrique – Bhayangkara – 2023
- Cristiano Lopes – Pelita Jaya, Deltras – 2008–2009, 2010–2011
- **Dalberto Belo** – Madura United, **Arema** – 2023–
- Daniel Baroni – PSM Makassar – 2009
- Danilo Alves – PSS Sleman – 2024
- Danilo Fernando – Persik Kediri, Deltras, Persisam Putra Samarinda – 2008–2012
- David Bala – Kalteng Putra – 2019
- David da Rocha – Persipura Jayapura – 2008–2009
- **David da Silva** – Persebaya Surabaya, Persib Bandung, **Malut United** 2018, 2019–2020, 2021–
- Demerson Bruno – Bali United, Persela Lamongan – 2017–2019, 2021–2022
- Devid da Silva – Barito Putera 2023–2024
- Diano – Sriwijaya – 2010–2011
- Dida – Madura United, Malut United – 2024–2025
- Diego Assis – Persela Lamongan, Madura United, Bali United – 2018–2019, 2021
- **Diego Mauricio** - Persebaya Surabaya, **Semen Padang** - 2025-
- Diego Santos – Sriwijaya, Persiba Balikpapan, Semen Padang – 2011–2013, 2016
- **Dimitri Lima** - **Persis Solo** - 2026-
- Diogo Campos – Kalteng Putra, Persebaya Surabaya, Borneo – 2019–2021
- Dionatan Machado – Persik Kediri – 2021-2022
- Douglas Coutinho - Borneo FC - 2025
- Douglas Cruz - Persijap Jepara - 2025
- Douglas Packer – Barito Putera – 2017–2018
- **Éber Bessa** – Bali United, **Persita Tangerang** – 2021–2024, 2025–
- Edésio Junior – Deltras, Persijap Jepara – 2008–2009
- Eduardo Kau – Persikabo 1973 – 2023–2024
- Eduardo Kunde - Persis Solo - 2024-2025
- Eduardo Maciel – Gresik United – 2016
- **Emerson Souza** - **Madura United** - 2026-
- Evaldo Silva – Persijap Jepara – 2008–2011, 2014
- Everton Nascimento – PSM Makassar, Bali United' – 2022–2023, 2024-2025
- Eydison Soares – Kalteng Putra – 2019
- **Fábio Calonego** - **Persija Jakarta** - 2025-
- Fábio Lopes – Persib Bandung, Persija Jakarta – 2008–2009
- Fabrício Bastos – PSMS Medan, Persita Tangerang – 2008–2009, 2013–2014
- Felipe Martins – PSMS Medan – 2018
- Fernandinho – Badak Lampung, PSIS Semarang – 2019, 2024
- Flávio Beck – Borneo, Bhayangkara, Semen Padang, PSIS Semarang – 2016–2017, 2019–2021, 2022
- Francisco Torres – Badak Lampung, Barito Putera, Borneo – 2019–2020, 2021–2022
- Gabriel do Carmo – Persela Lamongan, Persiraja Banda Aceh – 2020–2021
- Gabriel Furtado – Borneo Samarinda – 2024–2025
- **Gabriel Silva** - **Arema FC** - 2026-
- Giancarlo Rodrigues – PSM Makassar – 2020
- **Gledson Paixão** - **PSM Makassar** - 2025-
- Guilherme Batata – PSS Sleman, Persela Lamongan – 2019–2022
- **Gustavo Almeida** – Arema, **Persija Jakarta** – 2023–
- **Gustavo Fernandes** - **Persebaya Surabaya** - 2026-
- **Gustavo França** – Persib Bandung, **Malut United** – 2024–
- **Gustavo França** - Persija Jakarta, **Arema FC** - 2025-
- Gustavo Souza – PSIS Semarang – 2025
- Gustavo Tocantins – Persikabo 1973, Barito Putera, PSS Sleman – 2022–2025
- Harrison Cardoso – Persita Tangerang – 2021–2022
- Hedipo Gustavo – Kalteng Putra, Bhayangkara, Persipura Jayapura – 2019, 2021–2022
- Helder Lobato – Borneo – 2016–2017
- Henrique Motta – Persipura Jayapura – 2021
- Higor Vidal – Persebaya Surabaya – 2022
- Hilton Moreira – Persib Bandung, Sriwijaya, Persipura Jayapura – 2008–2013, 2016–2018
- **Hugo Gomes** – Madura United, **Dewa United** – 2021–
- **Igor Inocêncio** - **Malut United** - 2025-
- **Iran Júnior** – **Madura United** – 2024–
- Ivan Carlos – Persela Lamongan, Persija Jakarta – 2016–2018, 2021
- Jaimerson Xavier – Persija Jakarta, Madura United, Persis Solo, PSBS Biak, Bali United – 2017–2025
- Jairon – Persema Malang – 2009–2010
- **Jean Mota** - **Persija Jakarta** - 2026-
- Jefferson Assis – Bali United – 2023–2024
- **Jefferson Carrioca** - **Persis Solo** - 2026-
- Jefferson Oliveira – Persik Kediri – 2020
- **Jefferson Silva** - **Persebaya Surabaya** - 2026-
- Jefinho – Persik Kediri – 2023
- Jhon Cley – Persis Solo – 2025
- Joanderson – Persik Kediri – 2022
- **João Ferrari** – PSIS Semarang, **Bali United** – 2024–
- **Joel Vinícius** - Borneo FC, **Arema FC** - 2025-
- **Johnathan Pereira** - **Dewa United** - 2025-
- Jonata Machado – PSBS Biak – 2024–2025
- **Jorge Mendonça** - **Madura United** - 2025-
- Jose Barbosa – PSS Sleman – 2021–2022
- Jose Wilkson – Persebaya Surabaya, Persela Lamongan – 2021–2022
- **Júlio César** - **Persib Bandung** - 2025-
- Júlio César – Borneo Samarinda – 2023
- **Júnior Brandão** – **Madura United**, Bhayangkara, Malut United – 2023–2024, 2025, 2026-
- Júnior Lopes – Persiba Balikpapan – 2017
- **Kaio Nunes** - **Borneo FC** - 2026-
- Léo Gaúcho – Borneo Samarinda – 2024
- **Léo Lelis** – Persiraja Banda Aceh, **Persebaya Surabaya**, Borneo Samarinda – 2021–2024, 2025-
- **Léo Navacchio** - **Persik Kediri** - 2024-
- **Léo Silva** - **Bhayangkara FC** - 2025-
- Lexe – PSIS Semarang, Gresik United – 2008–2009, 2011
- Lucas Barreto – PSIS Semarang – 2024–2025
- **Lucas Cardoso** - **Malut United** - 2026-
- Lucas Dias - PSM Makassar - 2025
- **Lucas Frigeri** – Madura United, **Arema** – 2023–
- Lucas Gama – Persikabo 1973, PSIS Semarang, Barito Putera, Persik Kediri – 2022–2024, 2025
- **Lucas Morelatto** – Barito Putera, **Persijap Jepara** – 2024–2025, 2026-
- Lucas Patinho – Bali United – 2016
- Lucas Ramos – Dewa United – 2022–2023
- Lucas Salinas – Borneo Samarinda – 2024
- Lucas Silva – Barito Putera – 2019
- Luiz Carlos Jr – Barito Putera, Madura United, Persija Jakarta – 2016–2017
- Luiz Gustavo - Arema FC - 2025
- Luiz Ricardo – PSM Makassar – 2016
- **Lulinha** – **Madura United** – 2022–2023, 2024–
- **Luquinhas** - **PSBS Biak** - 2025-
- **Maicon de Souza** - Borneo FC, **Semen Padang** - 2025-
- Marcel Sacramento – Semen Padang, Persipura Jayapura, Barito Putera – 2016–2018
- Marcelo Barbosa - Persita Tangerang - 2024-
- Marcelo Cirino – PSS Sleman – 2025
- Márcio Rosário – Persela Lamongan, Persipura Jayapura – 2017, 2018
- Márcio Souza – Deltras, Arema Indonesia, Persib Bandung – 2009–2012
- Márcio Teruel – Arema Cronus – 2016
- Marclei Santos – Mitra Kukar – 2017
- Marlon da Silva – Mitra Kukar, Persiba Balikpapan, Borneo – 2016–2018
- Marquinhos Carioca – Badak Lampung, Persela Lamongan – 2019–2021
- **Matheus Alves** - **Persita Tangerang** - 2025-
- **Matheus Blade** - **Arema FC** - 2025-
- Matheus Lopes – Borneo – 2017
- Matheus Pato – Borneo Samarinda – 2022–2023, 2025
- Matheus Silva - PSM Makassar - 2025
- Mauricio Leal – Sriwijaya, Persipura Jayapura, Mitra Kukar – 2016, 2017–2018
- Maxuel de Cassio – Madura United – 2024
- Maxwell – Persiwa Wamena – 2013
- **Maxwell Souza** - **Persija Jakarta** - 2025-
- Maycon Calijuri – Persiba Balikpapan – 2016
- Mazinho – Perseru Serui – 2018
- **Moisés Gaúcho** - **Bhayangkara FC** - 2025-
- Murilo Mendes – Barito Putera – 2023–2025
- Mychell Chagas – PSS Sleman – 2022
- **Nilson Júnior** - **Malut United** - 2025-
- Odivan Koerich - Arema FC - 2025
- **Pablo Andrade** - Persija Jakarta, **PSBS Biak** - 2025-
- **Pablo Oliveira** – **Arema** – 2024–2025, 2026-
- Patrick da Silva – Persija Jakarta, Gresik United, Barito Putera – 2016–2018
- Patrick Mota – PSIS Semarang – 2019
- Paulinho Moccelin - Arema FC - 2025
- Paulo Eduardo – Persela Lamongan – 2016
- Paulo Henrique – Persiraja Banda Aceh, Persebaya Surabaya – 2021–2022, 2023–2024
- **Paulo Ricardo** - **Persija Jakarta** - 2026-
- Paulo Victor – Persebaya Surabaya – 2023
- Pedrinho – Persikabo 1973 – 2023–2024
- Pedro Cabral – Persikabo 1973 – 2023–2024
- Pedro Dias – Persija Jakarta – 2024
- Rafael Alves Bastos – Persib Bandung – 2008–2009
- Rafael Bonfim – Kalteng Putra – 2019
- Rafael Conrado – Persikabo 1973 – 2023
- Rafael Rodrigues - PSIM Yogyakarta - 2025
- Rafael Silva – Barito Putera, Madura United – 2019, 2021–2023
- Rafinha – Persela Lamongan, Barito Putera – 2019–2020, 2021, 2022
- Ramon Rodrigues – Persela Lamongan – 2017
- **Ramon Tanque** - **Persib Bandung** - 2025-
- Reinaldo Lobo – Mitra Kukar, PSMS Medan – 2014, 2018
- Renan Alves – Borneo, Barito Putera – 2018, 2022–2024, 2025
- Renan Silva – Persija Jakarta, Borneo, Bhayangkara, Madura United, Persik Kediri – 2018–2024
- Renan Sgaria Farias - Persikabo 1973 - 2022
- Ricardinho – Persipura Jayapura – 2016–2017
- Ricardo Lima – Persis Solo – 2024–2025
- **Riquelme Sousa** - **Madura United** - 2026-
- Róbson Duarte – Persebaya Surabaya – 2023–2024
- **Rodrigo Dias** - **Persik Kediri** - 2026-
- Rodrigo Moura - Persijap Jepara - 2025
- Rodrigo Ost – Mitra Kukar, Arema – 2015–2016, 2018
- Rodrigo Tosi – Persija Jakarta – 2016
- Ronaldo Rodrigues – Borneo Samarinda – 2024–2025
- Rosalvo Candido - Persijap Jepara - 2025
- **Savio Roberto** - **PSM Makassar** - 2025-
- Sílvio Rodrigues – Persebaya Surabaya, Persikabo 1973 – 2022–2023
- Tárik Boschetti – Pusamania Borneo – 2016
- Tallysson Duarte – PSS Sleman – 2022
- Taylon Correa – Persita Tangerang – 2022
- **Thales Lira** – PSS Sleman, Arema, **Persija Jakarta** – 2023–
- Thiago Amaral – Barito Putera, Persipura Jayapura – 2016, 2020–2021
- Thiago Cunha – Barito Putera – 2017
- Thiago Furtuoso – Bhayangkara, Madura United, Arema – 2015, 2016–2018
- **Uilliam Barros** - **Persib Bandung** - 2025-
- Vagner Luís – PSM Makassar, Persiwa Wamena, PSMS Medan – 2008–2010, 2011–2012
- **Valdeci Moreira** - **Arema FC** - 2025-
- **Van Basty Sousa** - **Persija Jakarta** - 2025-
- Vanderlei Francisco – Semen Padang, Persiraja Banda Aceh – 2019–2020
- **Vico Duarte** - PSS Sleman, Malut United, **Dewa United** - 2025-
- **Victor Luiz** - **PSM Makassar** - 2024-
- Victor Sallinas – RANS Nusantara – 2022
- Vinicius Reis – Persiba Balikpapan – 2016
- Vitinho – PSIS Semarang – 2023–2024
- **Walisson Maia** - **Arema FC** - 2026-
- Wallace Costa – Persela Lamongan, PSIS Semarang – 2018–2022
- Wander Luiz – Persib Bandung, PSS Sleman, RANS Nusantara – 2020–2023
- Wellington Carvalho – Bali United – 2023
- **Westherley Garcia** - **Borneo FC** - 2025-
- Wiliam Marcilio – Arema, Persib Bandung – 2024-2025
- Willian Correia – RANS Nusantara – 2023
- Willian Lira – Barito Putera – 2017
- Willian Pacheco – Persija Jakarta, Bali United – 2016–2017, 2019–2022
- Xandão – Persija Jakarta – 2019
- Yan Victor – Persebaya Surabaya – 2023–2024
- Yann Motta – Persija Jakarta, Arema FC – 2021, 2025
- Zada – PSMS Medan, Persela Lamongan – 2008–2011
- Zé Paulo – PSM Makassar – 2023–2024

== Bulgaria ==
- Martin Kovachev – Pusamania Borneo – 2015
- Stanislav Zhekov – Pelita Jaya – 2011–12

== Burkina Faso ==
- (Burkina Faso) Habib Bamogo – Persiram Raja Ampat – 2014–15

== Burundi ==
- (Burundi) **Abdallah Sudi** – PSIS Semarang, **Persijap Jepara** – 2024–
- (Burundi) **Christophe Nduwarugira** – **Borneo Samarinda** – 2024–
- (Burundi) Elvis Kamsoba – PSS Sleman – 2023–24

== Cambodia ==
- (Cambodia) Andrés Nieto - Bhayangkara FC - 2025

== Cameroon ==
- (Cameroon) Aaron Nguimbat – Sriwijaya – 2008–09
- Abanda Herman – Persija Jakarta, Persema Malang, Persib Bandung, Barito Putera – 2008–14
- (Cameroon) Alain N'Kong – Arema Indonesia, Persepam MU – 2011–12, 2013–14
- Banaken Bassoken – Persitara Jakarta Utara, PSPS Pekanbaru – 2009–11
- Bienvenue Nnengue – PSIS Semarang – 2008–09
- César M'Boma – Persitara Jakarta Utara – 2010
- Christian Desire Kono – Persiwa Wamena – 2009–11
- Cyril Tchana – PSPS Pekanbaru – 2009–10
- David Pagbe – Semen Padang, Persela Lamongan, Persib Bandung – 2010–11, 2014–16
- Émile Mbamba – Arema Malang, Persiba Bantul, Bhayangkara – 2008, 2014–15
- Emmanuel Kenmogne – Persija Jakarta, Persebaya ISL – 2013–15, 2016
- Epalla Jordan – Persela Lamongan – 2008
- Eric Bayemi – Persija Jakarta, Persidafon Dafonsoro – 2010–13
- Franck Ongfiang – Sriwijaya – 2014
- Georges Nicolas Djone – Persita Tangerang – 2008–09
- Gustave Bahoken – Mitra Kukar – 2011
- Guy Mamoun – Gresik United, Persijap Jepara – 2013–14
- Henry Njobi Elad – PSM Makassar, Barito Putera, Perseru Serui – 2009–10, 2013, 2016
- Jean-Paul Boumsong – Persiram Raja Ampat, Perseru Serui – 2012–2013, 2014–16
- Joel Tsimi – Sriwijaya, Persisam Putra Samarinda, PSPS Pekanbaru – 2008–13
- Jules Onambele – PSIS Semarang – 2008–09
- Louise Parfait – TIRA-Persikabo – 2019
- Luc Owona Zoa – Persisam Putra Samarinda – 2011–12
- Mbida Messi – Persib Bandung, Persiram Raja Ampat – 2012–14
- Ngon A Djam – Sriwijaya, Persebaya Surabaya, Persema Malang, Persidafon Dafonsoro – 2008–12
- Nyeck Nyobe – Persib Bandung, Persela Lamongan, Bontang – 2008–09, 2010–11
- Patrice Nzekou – PSPS Pekanbaru, Persiba Balikpapan – 2010–14
- (Cameroon) Pierre Njanka – Persija Jakarta, Arema Indonesia, Mitra Kukar, Persisam Putra Samarinda – 2008–10, 2011–13
- **Privat Mbarga** – Bali United, Dewa United, **Bhayangkara FC** – 2022–
- Rudolf Ebendje – Persitara Jakarta Utara – 2008–09
- Salomon Bengondo – PSIS Semarang – 2008
- (Cameroon) Seme Pierre Pattrick – Persema Malang, Arema Indonesia, Persiram Raja Ampat, Perseru Serui – 2008–14
- Serge Emaleu – Arema Malang, Persija Jakarta, Persela Lamongan – 2008–09, 2010–12
- (Cameroon) Thierry Gathuessi – Sriwijaya, Arema Indonesia, Persiram Raja Ampat, Barito Putera – 2010–16

== Canada ==
- (Canada) Keven Alemán – Persikabo 1973 – 2023–2024
- (Canada) **Kianz Froese** - **Semen Padang** - 2026-

== Cape Verde ==
- José Varela – Persikabo 1973 – 2023
- (Cape Verde) Mailson Lima – Persib Bandung – 2024
- (Cape Verde) **Yuran Fernandes** – **PSM Makassar** – 2022–

== Central African Republic ==
- (Central African Republic) Franklin Anzité – PS TIRA – 2017

== Chad ==
- (Chad) Ezechiel N'Douassel – Persib Bandung, Bhayangkara – 2017–22
- (Chad) Karl Max Barthélémy – Semen Padang – 2019–20

== Chile ==
- Alfredo Figueroa – PSM Makassar – 2008–09, 2010
- Cristian Carrasco – PSM Makassar, Persita Tangerang – 2009–13
- Cristian Febre – PSM Makassar, Bali United – 2013–15
- Edson Hoces – PSIS Semarang – 2008–09
- Julio Lopez – PSM Makassar, Persiba Balikpapan, Persisam Putra Samarinda, Persijap Jepara – 2008–12
- Luis Durán – Persita Tangerang – 2013–14
- Luis Peña – PSM Makassar, Gresik United, PSMS Medan – 2009–12
- Patricio Jiménez – PSMS Medan, Bontang – 2008, 2009–10
- Patricio Morales – Arema Indonesia, Persik Kediri – 2008–09, 2010–11

== China ==
- Mu Yongjie – Sriwijaya FC – 2010–11
- Qu Cheng – Persipura Jayapura – 2010
- (China) Zhang Shuo – Persik Kediri – 2010
- Zheng Cheng – Persebaya – 2005

== Colombia ==
- Aldair Simanca - Borneo FC - 2025
- Brayan Angulo - Madura United - 2025
- Edison Fonseca – Pelita Jaya – 2009–10
- **Jaime Giraldo** - **Semen Padang** - 2026-
- Jose Guerra – Persija Jakarta – 2016
- (Colombia) Juan Pablo Pino – Arema, Barito Putera – 2017–18
- **Juan Felipe Villa** - **Borneo FC** - 2025-
- **Julián Guevara** – **Arema** – 2023–
- **Kevin Lopez** - **PSBS Biak** - 2025-
- **Ruyery Blanco** - **PSBS Biak** - 2025-

== Congo (Republic of the Congo) ==
- **Jacques Thémopelé** - **PSM Makassar** - 2025-
- (Republic of the Congo) **Ravy Tsouka** - **Semen Padang** - 2026-

== Costa Rica ==
- (Costa Rica) Diego Campos - Bali United - 2026

== Croatia ==
- Christian Ilić - Bhayangkara FC - 2025
- Goran Ljubojević – Sriwijaya – 2015–16
- (Croatia) Ivan Bošnjak – Persija Jakarta – 2014
- **Luka Dumančić** - **Persis Solo** - 2026-
- Marko Šimić – Persija Jakarta – 2018–22, 2023–2025
- Mateo Kocijan – Persib Bandung – 2024–2025
- Mijo Dadić – Persiba Balikpapan, Deltras – 2008–12
- Stjepan Plazonja - Bhayangkara FC - 2025
- Tin Martić – Semen Padang – 2024–2025
- Tomislav Labudović – Persiba Balikpapan – 2012–13

== Curaçao ==
- (Curaçao) Gervane Kastaneer - Persib Bandung, Persis Solo - 2025

== Cyprus ==
- (Cyprus) Alekos Alekou – Barito Putera – 2015

== Czech Republic ==
- (Czech Republic) Michael Krmenčík – Persija Jakarta – 2022–23
- (Czech Republic) Ondřej Kúdela – Persija Jakarta – 2022–2025

== DR Congo (Democratic Republic of the Congo) ==
- Ladislas Bushiri – Persitara Jakarta Utara – 2009–10

== East Timor (Timor-Leste) ==
- Alan Leandro – Sriwijaya, Mitra Kukar – 2012, 2016
- (Timor-Leste) Diogo Santos Rangel – Sriwijaya, Gresik United – 2012–2013
- (Timor-Leste) Felipe Bertoldo – Mitra Kukar, Arema – 2016, 2017
- (Timor-Leste) **Gali Freitas** – PSIS Semarang, **Persebaya Surabaya** – 2023–
- (Timor-Leste) Jesse Pinto – Mitra Kukar – 2013–2014
- (Timor-Leste) João Pedro – PSM Makassar – 2023–24
- (Timor-Leste) Paulo Helber – Bhayangkara Surabaya United – 2016–2017
- (Timor-Leste) Paulo Martins – PSM Makassar – 2016
- (Timor-Leste) Pedro Henrique – Madura United, Persikabo 1973 – 2022–23
- Thiago Fernandes – Persipura Jayapura – 2016

== England ==
- Adam Mitter – Persiraja Banda Aceh, Persita Tangerang, PSM Makassar – 2020, 2021–22
- (England) Carlton Cole – Persib Bandung – 2017
- Charlie Scott – Semen Padang – 2024
- Daniel Heffernan – Bali United – 2016–2017
- Danny Guthrie – Mitra Kukar – 2018
- **Deri Corfe** - **PSIM Yogyakarta** - 2025-
- Marcus Bent – Mitra Kukar – 2011–2012

== Equatorial Guinea ==
- (Equatorial Guinea) **Pablo Ganet** – **Persita Tangerang** – 2025–

== Estonia ==
- (Estonia) Martin Vunk – Persija Jakarta – 2015

== Finland ==
- (Finland) Eero Markkanen – PSM Makassar – 2019
- (Finland) Petteri Pennanen – Persikabo 1973 – 2020

== France ==
- **Aly Ndom** - **Persijap Jepara** - 2026-
- **Andrew Jung** - **Persib Bandung** - 2025-
- Benoît Lumineau – Persiwa Wamena – 2008
- **Boubakary Diarra** – PSIS Semarang, **Semen Padang** – 2023–2025, 2026-
- Junior Bakayoko – Persikabo 1973 – 2023
- (France) **Layvin Kurzawa** - **Persib Bandung** - 2026-
- Loris Arnaud – Persela Lamongan, TIRA-Persikabo – 2018–19
- Ousmane Fané – Persik Kediri – 2024–2025
- Steven Paulle – PSM Makassar, Persija Jakarta – 2017–19
- Sylvain Atieda - Persik Kediri - 2025

== Gabon ==
- (Gabon) Landry Poulangoye – Arema Indonesia – 2009–10
- (Gabon) Lévy Madinda – Persib Bandung, Barito Putera – 2023, 2024–2025

== Germany ==
- Hanno Behrens – Persija Jakarta – 2022–23
- Romeo Filipović – Bontang, Persela Lamongan – 2010, 2016–17

== Ghana ==
- (Ghana) **Alhassan Wakaso** - **Semen Padang** - 2025-
- Elvis Sakyi - Persijap Jepara - 2025
- Emmanuel Oti Essigba – Madura United – 2020
- (Ghana) Michael Essien – Persib Bandung – 2016–2017
- (Ghana) Phil Ofosu-Ayeh – PSS Sleman – 2024–2025

== Greece ==
- Alexandros Tanidis – PSMS Medan – 2018–19
- (Greece) Dimitris Kolovos – Dewa United – 2023–24
- Marios Ogkmpoe – Persita Tangerang – 2024–2025

== Guam ==
- (Guam) Shane Malcolm – PSM Makassar, Bhayangkara Surabaya United, Persela Lamongan – 2016

== Guinea ==
- (Guinea) Aboubacar Camara – PS TNI – 2017
- (Guinea) Aboubacar Sylla – PS TNI – 2017
- (Guinea) Boubacar Keita – Arema Malang – 2008–09
- Souleymane Traore – Arema Malang – 2008–09

== Guinea-Bissau ==
- (Guinea-Bissau) Abel Camará – Arema – 2022–23
- (Guinea-Bissau) Amido Baldé – Persebaya Surabaya, PSM Makassar – 2019
- João Pereira - PSM Makassar, Madura United - 2025

== Haiti ==
- (Haiti) Sony Norde - Malut United - 2025
- (Haiti) Shanyder Borgelin - Bhayangkara FC - 2025

== Hong Kong ==
- (Hong Kong) Lam Hok Hei – Persija Jakarta – 2013
- (Hong Kong) Sandro – PSM Makassar – 2018

== Iran ==
- Afshin Parsaeian – Persitara Jakarta Utara – 2009–10
- Daryoush Ayyoubi – PSM Makassar, Arema Indonesia, Persiram Raja Ampat – 2009–15
- Ebrahim Loveinian – Persisam Putra Samarinda – 2013–14
- Hamid Reza Zakaria – Persiba Balikpapan – 2009–10
- Javad Moradi – Persidafon Dafonsoro, Persita Tangerang – 2012–14
- (Iran) Milad Zeneyedpour – Madura United – 2018
- Vali Khorsandipish – Persitara Jakarta Utara, Persiwa Wamena, Sriwijaya – 2009–10, 2013–14

== Iraq ==
- Anmar Almubaraki – Persiba Balikpapan – 2017
- Brian Ferreira – PSS Sleman, Persela Lamongan, PSIS Semarang, Persiraja Banda Aceh 2019–22
- Brwa Nouri – Bali United – 2018–23
- Frans Putros – Persib Bandung – 2025–26
- Selwan Al-Jaberi – Persela Lamongan – 2022

== Italy ==
- Federico Barba – Persib Bandung – 2025–2026
- Marco Motta – Persija Jakarta – 2020–2022
- Nicolao Cardoso – PSS Sleman – 2024–2025
- Stefano Beltrame – Persib Bandung – 2023–24

== Ivory Coast ==
- Boman Aimé – PSM Makassar, Perseru Serui – 2014–2018
- (Ivory Coast) Boubacar Sanogo – Madura United – 2017
- (Ivory Coast) Didier Zokora – Semen Padang – 2017
- Franck Bezi – Persiba Balikpapan, Persik Kediri – 2013–2014
- **Henry Doumbia** - **Bhayangkara FC** - 2026-
- Hervé Guy – Bhayangkara – 2020
- Lamine Diarrassouba – PSM Makassar – 2016
- (Ivory Coast) Lanciné Koné – Deltras, Persisam Putra Samarinda, Sriwijaya, Persipura Jayapura, Arema Cronus – 2011–2016
- Siaka Dembélé – Perseru Serui – 2016
- Wilfried Kisito Yessoh – PSMS Medan – 2018

== Jamaica ==
- Chevaughn Walsh – PSIS Semarang – 2022
- (Jamaica) **Damion Lowe** - **Dewa United** - 2026-

== Japan ==
- Atsushi Yonezawa – Persiba Bantul – 2014
- **Daisuke Sakai** - **PSM Makassar** - 2024-
- Hisanori Takada – Persitara Jakarta Utara – 2010
- Kaishu Yamazaki – Persikabo 1973 – 2023
- Kan Kikuchi – Bontang – 2010
- Katsuyoshi Kimishima – Bhayangkara – 2022
- **Kazaki Nakagawa** - **Semen Padang** - 2026-
- **Kei Hirose** – Persela Lamongan, **Borneo Samarinda** – 2019–20, 2021–
- Kei Sano – PSS Sleman – 2023
- Kenji Adachihara – Bontang, Persiba Balikpapan, Persib Bandung, Persita Tangerang – 2009–2014
- Kenzo Nambu – PSM Makassar, Bali United, Borneo FC – 2022–2025
- Kodai Iida – RANS Nusantara – 2022
- **Kodai Tanaka** - Persis Solo, **Dewa United** - 2025-
- Kosuke Uchida – Persela Lamongan, Barito Putera – 2017, 2019
- Masahito Noto – Persiba Balikpapan – 2017
- Mitsuru Maruoka – RANS Nusantara, Bali United – 2022–2025
- Noriki Akada – Madura United – 2024
- Renshi Yamaguchi – Arema – 2021–23
- Ryo Fujii – PSIS Semarang – 2023
- **Ryo Matsumura** – Persis Solo, Persija Jakarta, **Bhayangkara FC** – 2022–
- Ryohei Michibuchi - Semen Padang - 2024
- Ryota Noma – Barito Putera – 2022–23
- Ryutaro Karube – Perseru Serui – 2017–18
- Seiji Kaneko – Mitra Kukar – 2012
- **Sho Yamamoto** – Persebaya Surabaya, Persis Solo, **Bhayangkara FC** – 2022–
- Shohei Matsunaga – Persib Bandung, Persiba Balikpapan, Gresik United, Persela Lamongan, PSMS Medan, PSIS Semarang – 2011–19
- Shori Murata – Persiraja Banda Aceh – 2021
- Shunsuke Nakamura – Persela Lamongan – 2020
- **Taisei Marukawa** – Persebaya Surabaya, PSIS Semarang. **Dewa United** – 2021–
- Takafumi Akahoshi – Arema – 2019
- Takatoshi Uchida – Persebaya Surabaya – 2009–10
- Takuya Matsunaga – Kalteng Putra, Persipura Jayapura, PSBS Biak – 2019–22, 2024-2025
- Tatsuro Nagamatsu – Malut United – 2024
- **Teppei Yachida** - **Bali United** - 2026-
- Tomoaki Komorida – Persela Lamongan – 2010
- Tomoki Wada – Persikabo 1973 – 2022
- (Japan) Tomoyuki Sakai – Pelita Jaya, Persiwa Wamena, Persiram Raja Ampat – 2010–2012
- Yamashita Kunihiro – Borneo, Perseru Serui/Badak Lampung – 2017–19
- Yuichi Shibakoya - Pelita Jaya, Persiwa Wamena – 2010–12
- **Yusaku Yamadera** - **PSIM Yogyakarta** - 2025-
- Yusuke Kato – Gresik United – 2017

== Jordan ==
- Siraj Ahmad – Pelita Jaya – 2009

== Kyrgyzstan ==
- (Kyrgyzstan) Akhlidin Israilov – PSIS Semarang – 2018
- (Kyrgyzstan) Azamat Baimatov – Borneo, Barito Putera – 2018, 2021
- Bektur Talgat Uulu – PSM Makassar – 2021
- (Kyrgyzstan) **Tamirlan Kozubaev** – **Persita Tangerang** – 2020–2021. 2025-
- (Kyrgyzstan) Veniamin Shumeyko – Persikabo 1973 – 2021–2022

== Latvia ==
- (Latvia) Deniss Romanovs – Pelita Bandung Raya – 2014–15

== Lebanon ==
- (Lebanon) Abou Bakr Al-Mel – PSIS Semarang – 2018
- (Lebanon) Hussein El Dor – PSM Makassar – 2020
- Ibrahim Bahsoun – Persik Kediri – 2021
- (Lebanon) Jad Noureddine – Pusamania Borneo, Arema – 2016–17
- (Lebanon) Jihad Ayoub – PSS Sleman – 2022–24
- (Lebanon) Mahmoud El Ali – Persiba Balikpapan – 2013
- (Lebanon) Majed Osman – Dewa United, Persik Kediri – 2022–2025
- (Lebanon) **Mohamad El Housseini** - **Borneo FC** - 2025-
- Mostafa El Qasaa – Persiba Balikpapan – 2013
- Omar El Din – Perseru Serui – 2017
- (Lebanon) Samir Ayass – Persiraja Banda Aceh – 2020

== Liberia ==
- (Liberia) **Abu Razard Kamara** - PSM Makassar, **Persis Solo** - 2025-
- Alexander Robinson – Persela Lamongan, Persiba Balikpapan – 2008–09, 2013
- Amos Marah – Deltras Sidoarjo – 2011–12
- (Liberia) Ansu Toure – Persiba Balikpapan – 2014–15
- (Liberia) Boakay Eddie Foday – Persiwa Wamena, Sriwijaya, Persipura Jayapura – 2008–15, 2016–18
- Jerry Boima Karpeh – Persisam Putra Samarinda, Persiram Raja Ampat – 2011–13
- (Liberia) Buston Browne – Arema Malang – 2009
- (Liberia) Dirkir Kohn Glay – Persiba Balikpapan – 2016–17
- (Liberia) Edward Wilson Jr – Semen Padang, Persipura Jayapura – 2008–14, 2016
- (Liberia) Erick Weeks Lewis – Persiwa Wamena, Sriwijaya, Mitra Kukar, Pusamania Borneo, Madura United, Persib Bandung – 2008–13, 2014–16, 2016–17
- (Liberia) Esaiah Pello Benson – Arema Malang, Persitara Jakarta Utara, Persiram Raja Ampat – 2008–09, 2011–12
- (Liberia) Isaac Pupo – Persebaya ISL – 2014
- (Liberia) James Debbah - PKT Bontang, Persiram Raja Ampat - 2008-10
- (Liberia) James Koko Lomell – Pelita Jaya, Gresik united, Deltras, Persija Jakarta, Barito Putera, Persiram Raja Ampat, Persipura Jayapura – 2008–09, 2011–16
- (Liberia) John Tarkpor Sonkaliey – Persitara Jakarta Utara, Persebaya Surabaya, Pelita Jaya, Persijap Jepara – 2008–10, 2011–12, 2014
- (Liberia) Josiah Seton – PKT Bontang – 2008–09
- (Liberia) Kubay Quaiyan – Persiram Raja Ampat – 2011–14
- (Liberia) Sengbah Kennedy – Arema, Persipura Jayapura – 2015–16
- Varney Pas Boakay – Persela Lamongan – 2009–10
- Yao Rudy Abblode – Arema – 2015
- (Liberia) Zah Rahan Krangar – Sriwijaya, Persipura Jayapura, Madura United, PSS Sleman, Persela Lamongan 2008–14, 2018–21

== Luxembourg ==
- (Luxembourg) **Mirza Mustafić** - **Bali United** - 2025-

== Malaysia ==
- (Malaysia) Junior Eldstål – Dewa United – 2023
- (Malaysia) Kiko Insa – Arema, Bali United – 2015–16
- (Malaysia) Safee Sali – Pelita Jaya – 2010–13
- (Malaysia) **Dominic Tan** – **Dewa United** – 2026–

== Mali ==
- (Mali) Abdoulaye Maïga – Sriwijaya, Persipura Jayapura – 2013–15, 2018
- Amadou Gakou – Perseru Serui – 2016
- Djibril Coulibaly – Barito Putera, Persib Bandung, Persija Jakarta 2013–14, 2016
- (Mali) Dramane Coulibaly – Pelita Jaya – 2010–11
- (Mali) Ichaka Diarra – Arema – 2023
- (Mali) Mahamadou N'Diaye – Sriwijaya, Bali United – 2017–19
- Makan Konaté – PSPS, Barito Putera, Persib, Sriwijaya, Arema, Persebaya, Persija. RANS Nusantara – 2012–15, 2018–20, 2021–23
- (Mali) Mamadou Samassa – Madura United, Persipura Jayapura – 2018–19
- (Mali) Mohamed Sissoko – Mitra Kukar – 2017
- **Moussa Sidibé** – Persis Solo, **Bhayangkara FC** – 2023–2025, 2026-
- (Mali) Sékou Camara – PSAP Sigli, Persiwa Wamena, Pelita Bandung Raya – 2011–13

== Martinique ==
- (Martinique) Julien Faubert – Borneo – 2018

== Mexico ==
- **Francisco Rivera** – Madura United, **Persebaya Surabaya** – 2023–

== Moldova ==
- (Moldova) Eduard Văluță – Persepam MU – 2014

== Montenegro ==
- Balša Božović – Persela Lamongan, Arema – 2015, 2018
- **Boris Kopitović** - **Bali United** - 2025-
- Danin Talović – Persikabo 1973 – 2021–22
- **Dejan Račić** - Bhayangkara FC, **Persita Tangerang** - 2025-
- (Montenegro) **Dušan Lagator** - **PSM Makassar** - 2026-
- Igor Radusinović – Barito Putera – 2015
- **Mihailo Perović** - **Persebaya Surabaya** - 2025-
- Miljan Radović – Persib Bandung, Pelita Bandung Raya – 2011–13
- (Montenegro) Miloš Krkotić – Bali United – 2018
- (Montenegro) **Miloš Raičković** - **Persebaya Surabaya** - 2025-
- **Slavko Damjanović** – Persebaya Surabaya, **Bhayangkara FC** – 2024–
- Srđan Lopičić – Persisam Putra Samarinda, Persela Lamongan, Borneo, Arema, Persiba Balikpapan, Persib Bandung – 2011–12, 2014–16, 2017–19
- (Montenegro) Vladimir Vujović – Persib Bandung, Bhayangkara – 2014–18
- Zdravko Dragićević – Persib Bandung – 2011

== Morocco ==
- Abdelaziz Dnibi – PSIS Semarang – 2008–2009
- **Alaeddine Ajaraie** - **Persija Jakarta** - 2026-
- Khairallah Abdelkbir – Bhayangkara – 2016
- **Mohcine Hassan** – Persita Tangerang, **PSBS Biak** – 2023–2024, 2025-
- **Noah Sadaoui** - **Dewa United** - 2026-
- Redouane Barkaoui – Persiwa Wamena, Pelita Jaya, Persela Lamongan – 2009–2013
- Redouane Zerzouri – Madura United, PS TNI – 2017
- Tarik Chaoui – Persiwa Wamena – 2008–2009
- Youness Mokhtar – Bhayangkara – 2022

== Myanmar ==
- (Myanmar) Myat Kaung Khant – Persikabo 1973 – 2023–24
- (Myanmar) Win Naing Tun – Borneo Samarinda – 2023–24

== Namibia ==
- (Namibia) Sadney Urikhob – PSMS Medan – 2018

== Nepal ==
- (Nepal) Rohit Chand – PSPS Pekanbaru, Persija Jakarta, Persik Kediri – 2012–15, 2017–2025

== Netherlands ==
- Anco Jansen – PSM Makassar – 2021–2022
- **Anton Fase** - **PSIM Yogyakarta** - 2025-
- Arsenio Valpoort – Persebaya Surabaya – 2022
- Djamel Leeflang – Perseru Serui – 2018
- **Donny Warmerdam** - **PSIM Yogyakarta** - 2025-
- Emile Linkers – Persepam MU – 2013–14
- Geoffrey Castillion – Persib Bandung – 2020–2021
- Jan Lammers – Borneo – 2019
- **Jasey Wehrmann** - **Madura United** - 2025-
- Jelle Goselink – Borneo Samarinda – 2023–24
- **Jop van der Avert** - **PSIM Yogyakarta** - 2026-
- **Jordy Bruijn** - **Bali United** - 2025-
- Jordy Tutuarima - Persis Solo - 2025
- **Jordy Wehrmann** – **Madura United** – 2024–
- Kevin Brands – Bali United – 2018
- Kevin Olivieira – Mitra Kukar – 2011–12
- Kevin van Kippersluis – Persib Bandung – 2019
- Kristian Adelmund – Persepam Madura United, Persela Lamongan – 2012–2013, 2015–2016
- **Mike Hauptmeijer** - **Bali United** - 2025-
- Melvin Platje – Bali United, Bhayangkara – 2018–2022
- **Nick Kuipers** – Persib Bandung, **Dewa United** – 2019–
- Nick van der Velden – Bali United – 2017–2018
- Ronald Hikspoors – PSM Makassar – 2016
- **Sonny Stevens** – **Dewa United** – 2023–
- Sylvano Comvalius – Bali United, Arema, Persipura Jayapura – 2017, 2019–2020
- **Thijmen Goppel** - **Bali United** - 2025-
- **Tim Receveur** - **Bali United** - 2025-
- Wiljan Pluim – PSM Makassar, Borneo Samarinda – 2016–24
- Xandro Schenk - Persis Solo - 2025

== New Zealand ==
- (New Zealand) Shane Smeltz - Borneo – 2017

== Nicaragua ==
- (Nicaragua) Jaime Moreno - Barito Putera - 2025

== Niger ==
- (Niger) **Najeeb Yakubu** - **Persijap Jepara** - 2025-

== Nigeria ==
- (Nigeria) Alhaji Gero – Barito Putera – 2024
- Anoure Obiora – Sriwijaya, PSM Makassar, Persisam Putra Samarinda – 2008–10, 2013
- Ernest Jeremiah - Persipura Jayapura – 2008–09
- George Oyedepo – Persiba Bantul – 2014
- Henry Makinwa – PSMS Medan – 2009-2010
- Kabir Bello – Persitara Jakarta Utara, PSPS Pekanbaru – 2008–10, 2012
- Kenneth Ngwoke – Semen Padang – 2024
- Onyekachukwu Aloso – Persidafon Dafonsoro – 2013
- (Nigeria) Peter Odemwingie – Madura United – 2017–18
- Udo Fortune – Arema Malang, Persib Bandung, Persik Kediri – 2008–09, 2014–15

== North Macedonia ==
- (North Macedonia) Aleksandar Bajevski – Pelita Jaya – 2011–12
- Dime Dimov - Persebaya Surabaya - 2025
- Goran Gančev – PSMS Medan, Semen Padang, Pusamania Borneo, Arema, Persegres Gresik, Sriwijaya – 2012, 2015–17, 2018
- Jasmin Mecinovikj – Persela Lamongan – 2020
- **Nehar Sadiki** - **Bhayangkara FC** - 2025-
- **Risto Mitrevski** – Dewa United, **Persebaya Surabaya** – 2022–

== Palestine ==
- (Palestine) Jonathan Cantillana – PSIS Semarang, PSS Sleman – 2019–23
- (Palestine) Mahmoud Eid – Persebaya Surabaya – 2020
- (Palestine) Mohammed Rashid – Persib Bandung, Bali United, Persebaya Surabaya – 2021–22, 2023–2025
- (Palestine) Yashir Islame Pinto – Barito Putera – 2020

== Panama ==
- (Panama) Jan Carlos Vargas – Semen Padang – 2024

== Paraguay ==
- Aldo Barreto – PSM Makassar, Bontang, Persiba Balikpapan, Gresik United – 2008–14
- Arnaldo Villalba – Persijap Jepara – 2008–10
- Carlos González – Persiba Balikpapan – 2014
- Diego Fretes – Persepam MU – 2014
- Diego Martínez – Malut United – 2024–2025
- Diego Mendieta – Persitara Jakarta Utara – 2009–10
- Jorge Bareiro – Gresik United – 2010–11
- José Jara – Persepam MU – 2014
- Juan Acuña – Barito Putera – 2014–15
- Juan Ramirez – Pelita Jaya – 2010–11
- Julio Larrea – Persebaya ISL – 2014
- Lorenzo Cabanas – Persib Bandung – 2008–09
- Moisés Maldonado – PKT Bontang – 2009–10
- Osvaldo Moreno – PSM Makassar – 2010
- Pedro Velázquez – Persija Jakarta, Gresik United, Persela Lamongan, Borneo – 2011–2016
- René Martínez – Persib Bandung – 2008–10
- Richard Caceres – Persija Jakarta, Persiba Balikpapan – 2009–10, 2011–12
- Roberto Acosta – Deltras, PSM Makassar
- Samuel Lim Núñez – Persidafon Dafonsoro – 2013
- Wilfredo Genes – PKT Bontang – 2008–09

== Philippines ==
- (Philippines) Anthony Pinthus – PSS Sleman – 2023–2024
- (Philippines) Carli de Murga – Barito Putera – 2023–2024
- (Philippines) Christian Rontini – Persita Tangerang, Madura United – 2023–2024
- (Philippines) Daisuke Sato – Persib Bandung – 2022–2023
- (Philippines) Diego Bardanca – Persis Solo – 2023–2024
- (Philippines) Dylan de Bruycker – Bhayangkara – 2023
- (Philippines) Jason de Jong – Persiba Balikpapan – 2011
- (Philippines) Julian Schwarzer – Arema – 2023–2024
- Kainoa Bailey – Persikabo 1973 – 2023
- (Philippines) Kenshiro Daniels – RANS Nusantara – 2023–2024
- (Philippines) Kevin Ray Mendoza – Persib Bandung – 2023–2025
- (Philippines) Kike Linares – PSM Makassar – 2023
- (Philippines) Marwin Angeles – Persik Kediri – 2022
- (Philippines) Mike Ott – Barito Putera – 2022–2024
- (Philippines) OJ Porteria – Dewa United – 2023–2024
- (Philippines) Oliver Bias – Persija Jakarta – 2023–2024
- Omid Nazari – Persib Bandung – 2019–2021
- (Philippines) Satoshi Ōtomo – Persib Bandung, Bontang, Persela Lamongan – 2010–2012
- (Philippines) Simen Lyngbø – Persik Kediri – 2023–2024

== Poland ==
- Maciej Gajos – Persija Jakarta – 2023–2025

== Portugal ==
- Adilson Silva – PSM Makassar – 2023–2024
- Adriano Castanheira – Malut United, Persis Solo – 2024–2025
- **Ângelo Meneses** – RANS Nusantara, Dewa United, **Semen Padang** – 2023–
- Carlos Fortes – Arema, PSIS Semarang – 2021–2024
- **Diogo Brito** - **Persijap Jepara** - 2025-
- **Eduardo Barbosa** - **PSBS Biak** - 2025-
- Elio Bruno Martins – PS TIRA, Bhayangkara – 2017–2018
- Ernesto Brunhoso – Persitara Jakarta Utara – 2009–2010
- Filipe Chaby - Semen Padang - 2025
- Flávio Silva – Persik Kediri, Persebaya Surabaya – 2023–2025
- **Francisco Carneiro** – RANS Nusantara, **Persik Kediri** – 2023–
- Gilson Costa – Persebaya Surabaya – 2024–2025
- **Igor Rodrigues** – **Persita Tangerang** – 2024–
- José Coelho – Persela Lamongan – 2017–2018
- Marco Baixinho - Semen Padang - 2025
- Paulo Sérgio – Bhayangkara, Bali United – 2017–2020
- Pedro Matos - Persik Kediri - 2025
- **Pedro Matos** - Semen Padang, **Persebaya Surabaya** - 2025-
- **Pedro Monteiro** – **Madura United** – 2024–
- Rui Rampa - Semen Padang - 2025
- **Sandro Embalo** – Persita Tangerang, **PSBS Biak** – 2024–
- Sérgio Silva – Arema – 2021–2023
- Silvério Junio – Borneo Samarinda – 2023–2024
- Tavinho Barros – RANS Nusantara – 2023–2024
- **Telmo Castanheira** - **Persik Kediri** - 2025-
- **Zé Valente** – PSS Sleman, Persebaya Surabaya, Persik Kediri, **PSIM Yogyakarta** – 2022–

== Republic of Ireland ==
- Fuad Sule - Persis Solo - 2025
- Roy O'Donovan – Mitra Kukar – 2015

== Russia ==
- Evgeni Kabaev – Persija Jakarta – 2015

== Saint Kitts and Nevis ==
- (Saint Kitts and Nevis) Keith Kayamba Gumbs – Sriwijaya, Arema Cronus – 2008–2013

== Saint Vincent and the Grenadines ==
- (Saint Vincent and the Grenadines) Cornelius Stewart – Semen Padang – 2024-2025

== Saudi Arabia ==
- Fahad Al-Dossari – Persiram Raja Ampat – 2013–2014

== Scotland ==
- Chris Doig – Pelita Jaya – 2011

== Senegal ==
- Latyr Fall – PSM Makassar – 2024–2025
- Pape N'Daw – Persipura Jayapura – 2018
- Pape Abdou Toure – Persija Jakarta – 2009–10
- Pape N'Diaye – PSPS Pekanbaru, Persidafon Dafonsoro, Gresik United, Persiba Balikpapan – 2012–2014

== Serbia ==
- **Aleksa Andrejić** - **Persita Tangerang** - 2025-
- Aleksandar Rakić – PS TIRA/Persikabo 1973, Madura United, Barito Putera – 2018–2022
- Boban Nikolić – Pelita Bandung Raya – 2014–2015
- Bojan Mališić – Persib Bandung, Badak Lampung – 2018–2020
- Danilo Sekulić – Barito Putera – 2020
- **Dejan Tumbas** - Persebaya Surabaya, **Persis Solo** - 2025-
- **Dušan Mijić** - **Persis Solo** - 2026-
- Dušan Stevanović – Persebaya Surabaya – 2023–2024
- **Luka Cumić** - **PSM Makassar** - 2026-
- Mario Maslać – PSS Sleman – 2021–2022
- Miljan Škrbić - Madura United - 2025
- **Miroslav Maričić** - **Persis Solo** - 2026-
- Nemanja Kojić – PSS Sleman – 2021
- Nemanja Obrić - Mitra Kukar, Pelita Bandung Raya - 2011-2013
- Nemanja Vidaković – Bali United – 2016
- Nemanja Vučićević – PSM Makassar – 2015
- Nikola Ašćerić – Persik Kediri – 2020
- Nikola Komazec – Bhayangkara – 2018
- Nikola Kovačević – Persikabo 1973 – 2023
- Petar Planić – PSIS Semarang – 2018
- Saša Zečević – Persiwa Wamena, PSMS Medan, Gresik United – 2010–2013, 2014–2017
- Srđan Ostojić – Arema – 2018
- Vanja Marković – Persiraja Banda Aceh – 2021
- **Vukašin Vraneš** - **Persis Solo** - 2026-
- Zoran Knežević – Bali United – 2016

== Sierra Leone ==
- (Sierra Leone) Abu Bakar Bah – PSAP Sigli – 2011–12
- (Sierra Leone) Alie Sesay – Persebaya Surabaya, PSIS Semarang – 2021–22
- Brima Pepito – Persiba Balikpapan, Persema Malang, Persitara North Jakarta – 2008–12
- (Sierra Leone) Ibrahim Conteh – Pelita Bandung Raya, Barito Putera, PS TNI, PSIS Semarang, Persipura Jayapura – 2015–19

== Singapore ==
- (Singapore) Agu Casmir – Persija Jakarta – 2010–2011
- (Singapore) Baihakki Khaizan – Persija Jakarta, Persib Bandung – 2009–2011
- (Singapore) Fahrudin Mustafić – Persija Jakarta, Persela Lamongan 2009–2011
- (Singapore) Itimi Dickson – Persitara North Jakarta, Persidafon Dafonsoro 2007–2009, 2011–2012
- (Singapore) Jacob Mahler – Madura United – 2023–2024
- (Singapore) Khairul Amri – Persiba Balikpapan – 2010–2011
- (Singapore) Muhammad Ridhuan – Arema Indonesia, Putra Samarinda, Borneo – 2009–2014, 2018
- (Singapore) Noh Alam Shah – Arema Indonesia, Persib Bandung – 2009–2012
- (Singapore) Precious Emuejeraye – Sriwijaya, Persija Jakarta, Persiba Balikpapan, Persidafon Dafonsoro – 2009–2013
- (Singapore) Song Ui-young – Persebaya Surabaya – 2023–2024
- (Singapore) Zulfahmi Arifin – Bhayangkara, Persis Solo – 2023–2024, 2025

== Slovakia ==
- Roman Chmelo – Arema Indonesia, PSM Makassar – 2009–12, 2014
- Roman Golian – Arema Indonesia, Persela Lamongan, Persiba Balikpapan – 2011–16

== Slovenia ==
- (Slovenia) Nastja Ceh – PSMS Medan – 2012–2013
- **Nermin Haljeta** – PSM Makassar, **PSIM Yogyakarta** – 2024–
- (Slovenia) Rene Mihelič – Persib Bandung – 2019

== South Africa ==
- Mfundo Cecil – PSAP Sigli – 2011–12
- Sthembiso Ntombela – PSAP Sigli – 2011

== South Korea ==
- Ahn Byung-keon – Bali United – 2016–2018
- An Hyo-yeon – Persela Lamongan – 2010–2011
- **Bae Sin-yeong** – **Persita Tangerang** – 2021–
- Choi Bo-kyung – Arema – 2024–2025
- Choi Dong-soo – Persisam Putra Samarinda, PSMS Medan, Persipura Jayapura – 2010–2013
- Choi Hyun-yeon – Persegres Gresik United – 2017
- Ha Dae-won – Barito Putera, Bali United – 2013–2015
- Han Dong-won – Persijap Jepara – 2014
- Han Ji-ho – Persik Kediri – 2009–2010
- Han Sang-min – Persela Lamongan – 2013
- Ham Hyeong-kyu – Persela Lamongan – 2010
- Hong Jeong-nam – Madura United – 2022
- (South Korea) Hong Soon-hak – Persija Jakarta, PS TNI – 2016–2017
- **Hwang Myung-hyun** - **PSBS Biak** - 2025-
- Jeon Byuk-euk – Persebaya Surabaya – 2009–2010
- Jeon Sung-ha – Persiram Raja Ampat, PSAP Sigli – 2011–2012
- Jeon Woo-young – PS TIRA – 2018
- Jeong Kwang-sik – Persija Jakarta, Madura United – 2012, 2016
- Joo Ki-hwan – PSM Makassar, PSPS Pekanbaru – 2010, 2012
- Kim Dong-chan – Persisam Putra Samarinda, Persiwa Wamena – 2012–2013
- Kim Jin-sung – Madura United, Barito Putera – 2021–2022
- Kim Jong-kyung – Persipura Jayapura – 2009–2010
- Kim Kang-hyun — Persiwa Wamena 2012–2013
- Kim Min-gyu – Semen Padang – 2024–2025
- Kim Sang-min – PS TIRA – 2018
- Kim Yong-hee – Persiba Balikpapan, Sriwijaya, Arema Indonesia – 2010–2013
- Kim Young-kwang – Persiba Balikpapan – 2013–2014
- Ko Jae-hyo – PSPS Pekanbaru – 2012
- Ko Jae-sung – Semen Padang – 2017
- Kwon Jun – PSM Makassar, Persepam MU – 2010–2012, 2013, 2016–2017
- Lee Dong-won – Sriwijaya – 2013
- Lee Kil-hoon – Semen Padang – 2016
- Lee Sang-min – Mitra Kukar – 2011
- Lee Soung-yong – PSAP Sigli, Persiram Raja Ampat – 2011–2013
- Lee Won-jae – Bhayangkara – 2020–2021
- Lim Joon-sik – Sriwijaya, Persipura Jayapura, Barito Putera – 2010–2016
- Moon Chang-jin – PSS Sleman – 2024
- Moon Chi-sung – Barito Putera – 2024–2025
- Na Byung-yul – Persik Kediri, Persita Tangerang – 2009–2010, 2013
- Oh In-kyun – PSMS Medan, Persela Lamongan, Gresik United, Mitra Kukar, Persib Bandung, Persipura Jayapura, Arema – 2011–2020
- Park Chan-young – Deltras – 2010–2011
- Park Chul-hyung – Persema Malang, Semen Padang, PSPS Pekanbaru, Persela Lamongan, Gresik United, Mitra Kukar – 2009–2015
- Park Jung-hwan – Persiba Balikpapan, PSM Makassar, Sriwijaya – 2009–2012
- Park Kyung-min – Persija Jakarta, Pelita Bandung Raya – 2012–2013
- Shin Hyun-joon – PSM Makassar, PSPS Pekanbaru, Deltras, PSMS Medan – 2009–2013
- Yoo Jae-hoon – Persipura Jayapura, Bali United, Mitra Kukar, Barito Putera – 2010–2019
- Yoo Wook-jin – PSAP Sigli, Persiram Raja Ampat – 2011–2012
- Yoon Soung-min – Persijap Jepara – 2010–2011

== South Sudan ==
- (South Sudan) Ajak Riak – PSS Sleman – 2023–24
- Ayom Majok – Persita Tangerang – 2025
- (South Sudan) Tito Okello – PSM Makassar – 2024

== Spain ==
- Alberto Rodríguez – Persib Bandung – 2023–24
- Alfonso de la Cruz – PSS Sleman – 2019–20
- **Borja Herrera - Persijap Jepara** - 2026-
- **Borja Martínez** - **Persijap Jepara** - 2026-
- **Chechu Meneses** – Barito Putera, Malut United, **Persik Kediri** – 2024–
- David González Roni – Persis Solo – 2023–2024
- **Ernesto Gómez** - **Persik Kediri** - 2026-
- Fernando Rodríguez – Mitra Kukar, Persis Solo – 2018, 2022–23
- Gerard Artigas – Persis Solo – 2022
- **Guillermo Fernández** - **Semen Padang** - 2026-
- **Iker Guarrotxena** - **Persijap Jepara** - 2026-
- **Imanol García** - **Persik Kediri** - 2025-
- Joan Tomàs Campasol – Persija Jakarta – 2019
- **Jon Toral** - **Persik Kediri** - 2026-
- Jorge Gotor Blas – Mitra Kukar – 2017
- José Galán – Persela Lamongan – 2016
- **José Enrique** - **Persik Kediri** - 2025-
- **Jose Tiri** - **Persijap Jepara** - 2026-
- Juan Carlos Belencoso – Persib Bandung – 2015–16
- **Koldo Obieta** - **Borneo FC** - 2026-
- Pablo Rodríguez – Madura United – 2016
- **Ramón Bueno** – Persija Jakarta, **Persita Tangerang** – 2024–2025, 2026-
- **Rayco Rodríguez** - **Persita Tangerang** - 2025-
- **Roger Bonet** – PSIS Semarang, **Madura United** – 2024–
- **Sergio Castel** - **Persib Bandung** - 2026-
- **Tyronne del Pino** – Persib Bandung, **Malut United** – 2023–
- Victor Herrero – Mitra Kukar – 2016–17
- Youssef Ezzejjari – Persik Kediri, Bhayangkara, Barito Putera, Madura United – 2021–22, 2024–2025

== Switzerland ==
- Karim Rossi – Dewa United, Persis Solo – 2022–2023, 2024

== Syria ==
- Marwan Sayedeh – Pelita Jaya, PSM Makassar, Gresik United, Pelita Bandung Raya – 2009–14
- (Syria) **Mouhamad Anez** - **Borneo FC** - 2026-
- Muhammad Albicho – Persiba Balikpapan – 2010–11
- Naser Al Sebai – Persib Bandung, Persisam Putra Samarinda – 2013, 2014

== Tajikistan ==
- (Tajikistan) Khurshed Beknazarov – TIRA-Persikabo – 2019
- (Tajikistan) Manuchekhr Dzhalilov – Sriwijaya, Persebaya Surabaya – 2018–2019
- (Tajikistan) Nuriddin Davronov – Madura United, Borneo, Persita Tangerang – 2018, 2020–2022
- (Tajikistan) **Rakhmatsho Rakhmatzoda** - **PSIM Yogyakarta** - 2025-
- (Tajikistan) **Sheriddin Boboev** - **PSM Makassar** - 2026-

== Thailand ==
- (Thailand) Elias Dolah – Bali United – 2023–2025
- (Thailand) Paitoon Tiepma – Persijap Jepara – 2009–2010
- (Thailand) Pipat Thonkanya – Persisam Putra Samarinda – 2009–2010
- (Thailand) Sinthaweechai Hathairattanakool – Persib Bandung – 2009
- (Thailand) Suchao Nuchnum – Persib Bandung – 2009–2010
- (Thailand) Yuttajak Kornchan – Pelita Jaya – 2009–2010

== Togo ==
- (Togo) Ali Khaddafi – PSM Makassar, Bontang, PSPS Pekanbaru, Sriwijaya, Persepam MU, Perseru Serui – 2008–15
- Djaledjete Bedalbe – Perseru Serui – 2015
- (Togo) Lantame Ouadja – PSM Makassar – 2008–09
- (Togo) Mawouna Amevor – Persela Lamongan – 2019

== Trinidad and Tobago ==
- (Trinidad and Tobago) Radanfah Abu Bakr – PS TNI – 2018

== Tunisia ==
- (Tunisia) Tijani Belaïd – Sriwijaya, Borneo – 2017, 2018

== Turkmenistan ==
- (Turkmenistan) Ahmet Ataýew – Arema, Persela Lamongan – 2017–2018
- (Turkmenistan) Artur Geworkýan – Persib Bandung – 2019
- (Turkmenistan) Ata Geldiýew – Perseru Serui – 2018
- (Turkmenistan) Mekan Nasyrow – Persik Kediri, Barito Putera, Semen Padang – 2009–10, 2013, 2014, 2016–17

== Ukraine ==
- **Roman Paparyga** - **Persis Solo** - 2026-
- Valeriy Gryshyn - Madura United - 2025
- Yevhen Bokhashvili – PSS Sleman, Persipura Jayapura – 2019–21, 2021–22, 2023
- Yevhen Budnik – Persita Tangerang – 2020

== United States ==
- Victor Mansaray – PSM Makassar, Malut United – 2023–2024

== Uruguay ==
- **Adrian Luna** - **Persik Kediri** - 2026-
- Esteban Guillén – PSMS Medan, Arema Indonesia, Persiba Balikpapan – 2008–2013
- Gonzalo Andrada – Persis Solo – 2024
- Juan Alsina – Borneo – 2019
- Juan Salaberry – PSMS Medan – 2008–2009
- Matías Malvino – Arema – 2020
- Matías Mier – Bhayangkara, Barito Putera – 2023–2024, 2025
- Ronald Fagundez – Persik Kediri, Persisam Putra Samarinda – 2008–2012

== Uzbekistan ==
- (Uzbekistan) Artyom Filiposyan – TIRA-Persikabo – 2020
- Dilshod Sharofetdinov – PSMS Medan – 2018
- (Uzbekistan) Jahongir Abdumominov – Persija Jakarta – 2019
- **Javlon Guseynov** – Borneo, **Persita Tangerang** – 2019–
- Khurshidbek Mukhtorov - Persik Kediri - 2025
- Pavel Purishkin – PSM Makassar – 2017
- (Uzbekistan) Pavel Smolyachenko – Arema – 2019
- (Uzbekistan) Pavel Solomin – Sriwijaya, Putra Samarinda – 2010–2011, 2014
- Shukurali Pulatov – Semen Padang – 2019

== Venezuela ==
- Williams Lugo – PSBS Biak, Persik Kediri – 2024–2025

== Wales ==
- Adam Przybek – Persib Bandung – 2025

== Notes ==
1. Born in Angola
2. Born in Argentina
3. Born in Bosnia and Herzegovina (then part of Yugoslavia)
4. Born in Brazil
5. Born in Belgium
6. Born in Botswana
7. Born in Bulgaria
8. Born in Cameroon
9. Born in Chile
10. Born in Colombia
11. Born in Curaçao (constituent country of the Kingdom of the Netherlands [then part of the Netherlands Antilles])
12. Born in DR Congo
13. Born in Denmark
14. Born in England
15. Born in France
16. Born in Germany
17. Born in Guinea-Bissau
18. Born in Hong Kong
19. Born in Iran
20. Born in Italy
21. Born in the Ivory Coast
22. Born in Jamaica
23. Born in Japan
24. Born in Kenya
25. Born in the Netherlands
26. Born in Nigeria
27. Born in North Korea
28. Born in Norway
29. Born in New Zealand
30. Born in Portugal
31. Born in São Tomé and Príncipe
32. Born in Senegal
33. Born in Serbia (then part of Yugoslavia)
34. Born in Sierra Leone
35. Born in South Korea
36. Born in Spain
37. Born in Sudan
38. Born in Switzerland
39. Born in Uganda
40. Born in United States
41. Born in Uzbekistan (then part of the Soviet Union)
42. Born in Venezuela
43. Capped for the Argentina national under-17 football team
44. Capped for the Argentina national under-20 football team
45. Capped for the Aruba national football team
46. Capped for the Australia national under-17 football team
47. Capped for the Belgium national under-15 football team
48. Capped for the Belgium national under-16 football team
49. Capped for the Belgium national under-17 football team
50. Capped for the Belgium national under-21 football team
51. Capped for the Chile national under-18 football team
52. Capped for the Chile national under-19 football team
53. Capped for the Chile national under-20 football team
54. Capped for the France national under-21 football team
55. Capped for the France national football team
56. Capped for the Mali national under-20 football team
57. Capped for the Netherlands national under-17 football team
58. Capped for the Netherlands national under-19 football team
59. Capped for the Portugal national under-17 football team
60. Capped for the Portugal national under-18 football team
61. Capped for the Portugal national under-19 football team
62. Capped for the Portugal national under-21 football team
63. Capped for the Sweden men's national under-17 football team
64. Capped for the Sweden men's national under-19 football team
