= 2013 Indonesia Super League =

Indonesia Super League
- Season: 2013
- Dates: 5 January – 18 September 2013
- Champions: Persipura; 3rd ISL title 4th Indonesian title
- Relegated: PSPS; Persidafon; Persiwa
- AFC Cup: Persipura; Arema Indonesia
- Matches: 306
- Goals: 898 (2.93 per match)
- Top goalscorer: Boaz Solossa (25 goals)
- Biggest home win: Persela 9–1 PSPS (12 June 2013)
- Biggest away win: PSPS 0–6 Persija (24 August 2013)
- Highest scoring: Persela 9–1 PSPS (12 June 2013); Mitra Kukar 8–2 PSPS (15 September 2013)
- Longest winning run: 7 matches Arema Indonesia; Persib
- Longest unbeaten run: 26 matches Persipura
- Longest winless run: 11 matches Gresik United
- Longest losing run: 6 matches Persija
- Highest attendance: 40,002; Arema Indonesia 4–1 Sriwijaya (24 February 2013)
- Lowest attendance: 0 Persija 0–1 Persiram (6 April 2013); Persija 1–1 Persidafon (14 April 2013); Persiwa 0–1 Sriwijaya (24 May 2013); Persiwa 1–1 Pelita Bandung Raya (27 May 2013); Persija 3–0 Persiwa (1 June 2013)
- Total attendance: 2,866,621
- Average attendance: 9,368

The 2013 Indonesia Super League was the 5th season of the Indonesia Super League (ISL), a fully professional football competition as the top tier of the football league pyramid in Indonesia. The season began on 5 January 2013. Sriwijaya were the defending champions, having won their second league title.

This season was also the first season of ISL organized with authorization from the Joint Committee of PSSI until the establishment of a new league.

After the signing of the MoU between Djohar Arifin Husin (PSSI) and La Nyalla Matalitti (KPSI-PSSI) that was initiated by FIFA and the AFC through the Asian Football Confederation's Task Force, now Indonesia Super League was under the control of the Joint Committee to remain manageable by PT Liga Indonesia until the establishment of a new professional competition by the committee.

In the original plan the league season would have begun in November. But to honor the results of the joint committee meeting, the league schedule was postponed. At a meeting with club participants decided that the league would precisely start at 5 January 2013 and end on 18 September of the same year.

== Teams ==
PSMS, Deltras and PSAP Sigli were relegated during the end of the previous season. They were replaced by the best three teams from the 2011–12 Liga Indonesia Premier Division (LI), Barito Putera, Persita and Persepam Pamekasan.

Fourth-placed Premier Division sides PSIM failed to be promoted to the Indonesia Super League after being defeated by the 15th-placed finishers of 2011–12 Indonesia Super League, Gresik United by score 3–1.

Indonesian Premier League Champion (IPL) season 2011/2012, Semen Padang finally officially returned to the Indonesia Super League (ISL). The Return of Semen Padang to ISL was known as PT Liga Indonesia issued numbered 01010/Liga/X/2012, regarding the delivery status of Semen Padang.

Finalize participant Indonesia Super League (ISL) season 2013 was completed on 30 October 2012. After that PT Liga Indonesia built on the planning competition.

Persijap and Semen Padang returned to Indonesia Super League this season, but in last November Persijap and Semen Padang withdrew and joined Premier League

=== Stadiums and locations ===
Locations of the teams in the 2013 Indonesia Super League

Team	Location	Province	Stadium	Capacity	2011–12 season
Arema Indonesia	Malang	East Java	Kanjuruhan	35,000	12th in Super League
Barito Putera	Banjarmasin	South Kalimantan	Demang Lehman	6,500	Premier Division Champions
Gresik United	Gresik	East Java	Petrokimia	25,000	15th in Super League
Mitra Kukar	Kutai Kartanegara	East Kalimantan	Aji Imbut	35,000	9th in Super League
Pelita Bandung Raya	Bandung	West Java	Si Jalak Harupat; Siliwangi	40,000; 25,000	6th in Super League
Persela	Lamongan	East Java	Surajaya	25,000	4th in Super League
Persepam Madura United	Pamekasan	East Java	Gelora Bangkalan	25,000	3rd in Premier Division
Persib	Bandung; Bandung Regency	West Java	Siliwangi; Si Jalak Harupat	25,000; 40,000	8th in Super League
Persiba Balikpapan	Balikpapan	East Kalimantan	Persiba Stadium	12,500	7th in Super League
Persidafon	Jayapura Regency	Papua	Barnabas Youwe	15,000	10th in Super League
Persija	Jakarta	DKI Jakarta	Bung Karno Stadium	88,083	5th in Super League
Persipura	Jayapura	Papua	Mandala	30,000	Super League Runner-Up
Persiram	Sorong Regency	West Papua	Wambik KM 16	7,000	14th in Super League
Persisam Putra	Samarinda	East Kalimantan	Segiri	20,000	11th in Super League
Persita	Kuningan Regency	West Java	Mashud Wisnusaputra	10,000	Premier Division Runner-up
Persiwa	Jayawijaya Regency	Papua	Pendidikan	15,000	3rd in Super League
PSPS	Pekanbaru; Bangkinang	Riau	Kaharudin Nasution; Tuanku Tambusai	25,000; 7,000	13th in Super League
Sriwijaya	Palembang	South Sumatera	Gelora Sriwijaya	40,000	Super League Champions

=== Personnel and kits ===
Note: Flags indicate national team as has been defined under FIFA eligibility rules. Players and Managers may hold more than one non-FIFA nationality.

Team	Coach	Captain	Kit manufacturer	Shirt sponsor
Arema Indonesia	(Indonesia) Rahmad Darmawan	(Indonesia) Greg Nwokolo	Ultras	Anker Sport
Barito Putera	(Indonesia) Salahudin	(Turkmenistan) Mekan Nasyrow	SPECS	Hasnur Group
Gresik United	(Indonesia) Widodo C. Putro	(Paraguay) Aldo Barreto^{1} ^{2}	Joma	Gresik Migas, Phonska
Mitra Kukar	(Sweden) Stefan Hansson	(Indonesia) Hamka Hamzah		Petrona, Bankaltim
Pelita Bandung Raya	(France) Darko Janacković	(Croatia) Mijo Dadić^{3}	Joma	
Persela	(Argentina) Alfredo Vera	(Argentina) Gustavo Lopez	Diadora	So Nice
Persepam Madura United	(Indonesia) Daniel Roekito	(Indonesia) Zaenal Arief	Joma	Bank BRI
Persib	(Indonesia) Djajang Nurdjaman	(Indonesia) Atep	League	One Heart
Persiba	(Indonesia) Herry Kiswanto	(Cameroon) Patrice Nzekou	SPECS	Bankaltim, Artha Reka Satria
Persidafon	(Indonesia) Agus Yuwono	(Indonesia) Eduard Ivakdalam		Bank Papua
Persija	(Indonesia) Benny Dollo	(Brazil) Fabiano Beltrame	League	Kuku Bima
Persipura	(Brazil) Jacksen F. Tiago	(Indonesia) Boaz Solossa	SPECS	Freeport Indonesia
Persiram	(Brazil) Gomes de Olivera	(Liberia) Kubay Quaiyan		Go Raja Ampat, Bank Papua
Persisam Putra	(Indonesia) Sartono Anwar	(Indonesia) Muhammad Roby	Bold	Bankaltim
Persita	Vacant	(Chile) Luis Durán	Mitre	Samudera Chandra Persada Indonesia
Persiwa	Vacant	(Nigeria) O.K. John	Ultras	Bank Papua
PSPS	Vacant	(Indonesia) Muhammad Isnaini^{4}	Joma	
Sriwijaya	(Indonesia) Kas Hartadi	(Indonesia) Ponaryo Astaman	Joma	Bank Sumsel-Babel

^{1}Gustavo Chena is Gresik United captain, before he leaves the club after his contract terminated.
^{2}Aldo Barreto was Gresik captain until 14 June, when he suffered an injury due to a broken hand when playing against Arema and adjudged not to play again until the Super League finish. Ambrizal was handed the captaincy in Aldo's absence.
^{3}Eka Ramdani was Pelita captain until April, when he was injured. Mijo Dadić was handed the captaincy in Eka's absence.
^{4}Ambrizal is PSPS captain, before he resigned from the club and joined Gresik United.

=== Coach changes ===
==== Pre-season ====
Team	Outgoing coach	Manner of departure	Date of vacancy	Incoming coach	Date of appointment
Persidafon	(Moldova) Sergei Dubrovin	Contract terminated	July 2012	(Indonesia) Erent Pahelarang	July 2012
Persepam MU	(Indonesia) Winedi Purwito	Mutual consent	8 September 2012	(Indonesia) Mustaqim	4 September 2012
Gresik United	(Indonesia) Djoko Susilo	Contract terminated	July 2012	(Indonesia) Suharno	28 August 2012
Persisam Putra	(Serbia) Misha Radovic	Contract terminated	July 2012	(Indonesia) Sartono Anwar	September 2012
Persib	(Indonesia) Robby Darwis	Signed by Indonesia KPSI	August 2012	(Indonesia) Djajang Nurdjaman	15 August 2012
Arema Indonesia	(Indonesia) Suharno	Signed by Gresik United	28 August 2012	(Indonesia) Rahmad Darmawan	25 September 2012
Persela	(Czech Republic) Miroslav Janu	Signed by Persebaya DU	October 2012	(Brazil) Gomes de Olivera	23 October 2012
Persiwa	(Brazil) Gomes de Olivera	Signed by Persela Lamongan	23 October 2012	(Indonesia) Subangkit	25 November 2012
Persepam MU	(Indonesia) Mustaqim	Resigned	15 December 2012	(Indonesia) Daniel Roekito	25 December 2012
Persiba	(Austria) Hans-Peter Schaller	Sacked	18 December 2012	(Indonesia) Herry Kiswanto	18 December 2012

==== In season ====
Team	Outgoing coach	Manner of departure	Date of vacancy	Position in table	Incoming coach	Date of appointment
Gresik United	(Indonesia) Suharno	Sacked	27 February 2013	6th	(Indonesia) Khusaeri (interim)	27 February 2013
Persela	(Brazil) Gomes de Olivera	Sacked	3 March 2013	18th	(Indonesia) Didik Ludianto (interim)	4 March 2013
Pelita Bandung Raya	(Scotland) Simon McMenemy	Sacked	11 March 2013	16th	(France) Darko Janacković	11 March 2013
Persija	(Indonesia) Iwan Setiawan	Resigned	18 March 2013	18th	(Indonesia) Benny Dollo	19 March 2013
Gresik United	(Indonesia) Khusaeri	End of caretaker role	3 April 2013	13th	(Indonesia) Widodo C Putro	3 April 2013
Persita	(Indonesia) Elly Idris	Resigned	April 2013	14th	(Indonesia) Giman Nurjaman (interim)	April 2013
PSPS	(Indonesia) Mundari Karya	Resigned	28 April 2013	16th	(Indonesia) Afrizal Tanjung (interim)	1 May 2013
Persela	(Indonesia) Didik Ludianto	End of caretaker role	23 May 2013	10th	(Argentina) Alfredo Vera	23 May 2013
Persiram	(Indonesia) Jaya Hartono	Sacked	24 May 2013	9th	(Brazil) Gomes de Olivera	24 May 2013
Persidafon	(Indonesia) Erent Pahelarang	Mutual consent	5 June 2013	17th	(Indonesia) Agus Yuwono	5 June 2013
Persiwa	(Indonesia) Subangkit	Mutual consent	5 June 2013	14th	(Indonesia) Yanuar Hermansyah (interim)	7 June 2013
Persita	(Indonesia) Giman Nurjaman	End of caretaker role	8 June 2013	16th	(Chile) Simón Elissetche	9 June 2013
Persita	(Chile) Simón Elissetche	Resigned	15 July 2013	13th	(Indonesia) Giman Nurjaman (interim)	19 July 2013

== Foreign players ==
Club	Visa 1	Visa 2	Visa 3	Asian-Visa 1	Asian-Visa 2	Non-Visa Foreign	Former Player(s)
Arema Indonesia	(Brazil) Alberto Gonçalves	(Cameroon) Thierry Gathuessi	(Saint Kitts and Nevis) Keith Gumbs	(Australia) Edmar Garcia	None	(Nigeria) Greg Nwokolo^{1,2} (Nigeria) Victor Igbonefo^{1,2} (Uruguay) Cristian Gonzáles^{1,2}	(Singapore) Muhammad Ridhuan
Barito Putera	(Cameroon) Henry Njobi	(Mali) Djibril Coulibaly	(Mali) Makan Konaté	(South Korea) Ha Dae-won	(Turkmenistan) Mekan Nasyrow	None	(Liberia) Sackie Doe
Gresik United	(Serbia) Saša Zečević	(Cameroon) Ngon Mamoun	None	(Japan) Shohei Matsunaga	(Timor-Leste) Diogo Santos	None	(Paraguay) Aldo Barreto^{3} (Argentina) Gustavo Chena (South Korea) Park Chul-hyung
Mitra Kukar	(Argentina) Esteban Herrera	(Argentina) Paolo Frangipane	(Montenegro) Ilija Spasojević	(South Korea) Park Chul-hyung	(Timor-Leste) Jesse Pinto	(Netherlands) Raphael Maitimo^{1,2}	(Australia) Anthony Skorich (Australia) Jovo Pavlović
Pelita Bandung Raya	(Croatia) Mijo Dadić	(Argentina) Gaston Castano	(Montenegro) Miljan Radović	(Syria) Marwan Sayedeh	(South Korea) Park Kyung-min	None	(Mali) Sékou Camara^{4} (Australia) Dane Milovanović (Serbia) Nemanja Obrić
Persela	(Argentina) Gustavo López	(Slovakia) Roman Golian	(Argentina) Mario Costas	(South Korea) Oh In-kyun	(South Korea) Han Sang-min	None	None
Persepam MU	(Togo) Ali Khaddafi	(Netherlands) Emile Linkers	(Cameroon) Alain N'Kong	(Australia) Christopher Gómez	(Australia) Abu Bakar Sillah	None	(Liberia) Stephen Mennoh (Nigeria) Osas Saha (Netherlands) Kristian Adelmund (Mali) Amadou Konte (South Korea) Kim Sung-yeon (South Korea) Kwon Jun
Persib	(Cameroon) Abanda Herman	(Cameroon) Mbida Messi	(Brazil) Hilton Moreira	(Japan) Kenji Adachihara	(Syria) Naser Al Sebai	(Netherlands) Sergio van Dijk^{1,2}	(Cameroon) Herman Dzumafo
Persiba	(Cameroon) Patrice Nzekou	(Mali) Franck Bezi	(Liberia) Alexander Robinson	(Lebanon) Mostafa El Qasaa	(South Korea) Kim Young-kwang	None	(Brazil) Diego Santos (Serbia) Luka Savić (Lebanon) Mahmoud El Ali
Persidafon	(Paraguay) Samuel Lim Nuñez	(Nigeria) Onyekachukwu Aloso	(Senegal) Pape N'Diaye	(Iran) Javad Moradi	(Singapore) Precious Emuejeraye	None	(Argentina) Juan Cirelli (Cameroon) Eric Bayemi
Persija	(Brazil) Fabiano Beltrame	(Argentina) Robertino Pugliara	(Cameroon) Emmanuel Kenmogne	(Nepal) Rohit Chand	None	None	(Paraguay) Pedro Velázquez (Hong Kong) Lam Hok Hei (South Korea) Park Kyung-Min
Persipura	(Cameroon) Bio Paulin	(Liberia) Zah Rahan	(Brazil) Otávio Dutra	(South Korea) Yoo Jae-hoon	(South Korea) Lim Joon-sik	None	None
Persiram	(Liberia) Kubay Quaiyan	(Liberia) James Lomell	(Cameroon) Seme Pattrick	(South Korea) Lee Soung-yong	(Saudi Arabia) Fahad Al-Dossari	None	(Australia) Jerry Karpeh (Iran) Daryoush Ayyoubi
Persisam Putra	(Ivory Coast) Lancine Koné	(Nigeria) Osas Saha	(Cameroon) Joel Tsimi	(Iran) Ebrahim Loveinian	(Singapore) Muhammad Ridhuan	None	(Cameroon) Pierre Njanka (Nigeria) Anoure Obiora
Persita	(Chile) Luis Durán	(Chile) Cristian Carrasco	(Brazil) Fabricio Bastos	(South Korea) Kim Dong-chan	(South Korea) Na Byung-yul	None	(Iran) Jafad Moradi
Persiwa	(Nigeria) O.K. John	(Cameroon) Guy Junior	(Brazil) Maxwell	None	None	None	(Mali) Sékou Camara (Iran) Vali Khorsandipish (South Korea) Kim Yong-han
PSPS	None	None	None	None	None	None	(Cameroon) Joel Tsimi (Mali) Makan Konaté (Mali) Namory Camara (Nepal) Rohit Chand (Senegal) Latyr N'Diaye (South Korea) Lee Su-hyong
Sriwijaya	(Liberia) Erick Lewis	(Liberia) Boakay Foday	(Cameroon) Herman Dzumafo	(South Korea) Lee Dong-won	None	(Netherlands) Diego Michiels^{1,2}	(Timor-Leste) Diogo Santos (England) James Robinson (South Korea) Min Kyung-Bin (Togo) Ali Khaddafi

Note:
^{1}Those players who were born and started their professional career abroad but have since gained Indonesia Residency;
^{2}Foreign residents or foreign residents of Indonesian descent who have chosen to represent Indonesia national team;
^{3}Injury Replacement Players;
^{4}Pass away Players (R.I.P)

== League table ==
Pos	Team	Pld	W	D	L	GF	GA	GD	Pts	Qualification or relegation
1	Persipura (C)	34	25	7	2	82	18	+64	82	Qualification for AFC Cup group stage
2	Arema Indonesia	34	21	6	7	70	33	+37	66 (Note: Arema Indonesia three points deducted as a punishment from FIFA because they are late paying a fine of CHF5,000 for penalties in case of termination of the contract unilaterally against their foreign players from France, Jean Landry Poulangoye.)	Qualification for AFC Cup group stage
3	Mitra Kukar	34	19	8	7	60	42	+18	65	
4	Persib	34	18	9	7	72	43	+29	63	
5	Sriwijaya	34	17	6	11	56	61	−5	57	
6	Barito Putera	34	15	9	10	55	40	+15	54	
7	Persisam Putra	34	14	8	12	59	51	+8	50	
8	Persiram	34	11	12	11	41	37	+4	45	
9	Persegres Gresik United	34	12	9	13	41	45	−4	45	
10	Persepam Madura United	34	12	7	15	42	51	−9	43	
11	Persija	34	12	6	16	46	45	+1	42	
12	Persela	34	10	11	13	56	46	+10	41	
13	Persiba	34	10	10	14	42	48	−6	40	
14	Persita	34	9	11	14	34	52	−18	38	
15	Pelita Bandung Raya (O)	34	7	13	14	44	51	−7	34	Qualification for relegation play-off
16	Persidafon (R)	34	8	6	20	39	66	−27	30	Relegation to Premier Division
17	Persiwa (R)	34	9	3	22	33	62	−29	30	Relegation to Premier Division
18	PSPS (R)	34	4	5	25	26	107	−81	17	Relegation to Premier Division

Updated to match(es) played on 18 September 2013. Source: 2013 Super League table
Rules for classification: 1) points; 2) goal difference; 3) number of goals scored.
(C) Champions; (O) Play-off winners; (R) Relegated

== Results ==
The fixtures for the Super League were released on 14 December 2012. The season kicked off on 5 January 2013 and is scheduled to conclude on 7 September 2013.

Home \ Away	ARE	BPT	PGU	MKU	PBR	PSL	PPMU	PSB	PBA	PSDF	PSJ	PPR	PSRM	PPSA	PTA	PWA	RIA	SRI
Arema Indonesia		1–1	1–1	3–1	4–2	2–0	2–0	1–0	2–1	5–2	3–1	1–2	3–0	3–1	3–0	5–0	7–1	4–1
Barito Putera	1–0		1–0	5–1	1–1	3–2	2–1	2–2	1–0	3–0	2–1	1–0	2–2	2–0	0–0	3–0 (Note: Persiwa lost 0–3 against Barito Putera after they did not continue the match in the 43rd minute, after previously started the game with only seven players due to financial problems and the players strike)	5–2	6–1
Persegres	1–2	2–0		1–3	0–1	1–1	0–0	2–1	1–1	2–1	1–0	0–1	1–0	2–1	0–2	1–0	5–1	3–4
Mitra Kukar	2–1	1–0	2–0		3–2	3–1	2–1	4–2	2–0	1–0	2–0	0–3	0–0	2–1	1–1	4–2	8–2	4–2
Pelita Bandung Raya	1–1	1–1	1–2	1–1		2–2	0–1	1–3	0–0	3–1	3–2	0–2	2–1	3–1	0–1	2–1	1–1	2–2
Persela	0–0	0–0	1–1	2–0	1–1		4–0	1–1	5–2	2–0	1–1	1–0	1–3	1–1	3–1	4–0	9–1	1–2
Persepam MU	0–2	1–0	1–1	3–1	1–1	1–0		1–3	3–2	2–1	0–1	0–3	2–1	2–2	1–1	3–0	3–0	0–2
Persib	1–0	3–2	3–1	0–0	4–3	3–1	2–1		1–0	2–1	3–1	1–1	1–2	4–1	5–1	4–2	4–1	4–0
Persiba	1–0	1–0	1–2	0–0	1–0	1–0	3–3	1–1		3–1	0–1	3–3	2–2	1–1	1–0	3–0	4–1	4–2
Persidafon	1–2	1–2	2–1	0–2	1–1	2–1	3–2	0–0	2–0		0–1	0–2	1–2	0–3	4–0	3–1	3–1	1–3
Persija	1–2	3–1	2–2	1–2	2–1	1–2	0–3	1–1	2–0	1–1		2–3	0–1	1–1	5–0	3–0	1–0	1–0
Persipura	1–1	4–1	4–1	1–0	1–1	2–0	4–0	1–0	2–0	8–1	1–0		3–0	4–1	4–0	3–0 (Note: Persiwa loses 3–0 against Persipura after did not attend the match on 10 February 2013 at Mandala Stadium)	5–0	3–0
Persiram	1–2	3–1	0–0	2–2	2–1	1–1	2–0	2–2	1–0	0–0	0–0	1–1		2–0	1–0	1–1	5–0	0–1
Persisam Putra	2–3	0–0	1–2	2–1	2–1	2–0	4–1	2–1	2–2	5–1	3–2	0–0	2–1		1–0	0–2	6–1	4–2
Persita	0–1	1–1	2–2	0–0	2–0	0–3	0–0	2–2	3–1	2–2	0–1	1–1	1–0	1–0		2–1	0–0	2–4
Persiwa	2–2	1–0	0–1	1–2	1–1	2–1	2–0	2–3	2–0	1–0	2–0	0–2	1–0	1–3	2–3		3–0	0–1
PSPS	1–0	1–3	2–0	0–1	0–4	4–2	0–1	0–4	1–2	1–2	0–6	1–5	1–1	1–1	0–5	1–0		0–1
Sriwijaya	3–1	3–2	2–1	2–2	2–0	2–2	0–4	2–1	1–1	1–1	4–1	0–2	2–1	1–3	2–0	1–0	0–0	

Updated to match(es) played on 18 September 2013. Source: 2013 Super League Schedule and 2013 Super League result
Legend: Blue = home team win; Yellow = draw; Red = away team win.

== Promotion/relegation play-off ==
Played on 22 September 2013 in Manahan Stadium, Surakarta (Central Java)

Team 1	Score	Team 2
Pelita Bandung Raya	2–1	Persikabo

== Season statistics ==
=== Top scorers ===
Rank	Player	Club	Goals
1	(Indonesia) Boaz Solossa	Persipura	25
2	(Indonesia) Sergio van Dijk	Persib	21
2	(Mali) Djibril Coulibaly	Barito Putera	21
4	(Indonesia) Cristian Gonzáles	Arema Indonesia	19
4	(Ivory Coast) Lancine Koné	Persisam Putra	19
6	(Senegal) Pape N'Diaye	Persidafon (11); PSPS (7)	18
7	(Liberia) James Koko Lomell	Persiram	17
8	(Argentina) Gaston Castano	Pelita Bandung Raya	16
9	(Brazil) Alberto Gonçalves	Arema Indonesia	15
9	(Nigeria) Osas Saha	Persisam Putra (9); Persepam Madura United (6)	15

=== Own goals ===
Player	For	Club
(Indonesia) Gusripen Efendi	Persib	PSPS
(Brazil) Otávio Dutra	Barito Putera	Persipura
(Indonesia) Djayusman Triasdi	PSPS	Persela
(South Korea) Na Byung-yul	Arema Indonesia	Persita
(Indonesia) Firly Apriansyah	Barito Putera	Persepam Madura United
(Indonesia) Firly Apriansyah	Persita	Persepam Madura United
(Indonesia) Muhammad Ridwan	Mitra Kukar	Persib
(Paraguay) Pedro Velázquez	Persidafon	Persija
(Slovakia) Roman Golian	Persiwa	Persela
(Indonesia) Roy Budiansyah	Persija	Persiba

=== Hat-tricks ===
Player	For	Against	Result	Date
(Indonesia) Cristian Gonzáles	Arema Indonesia	Persidafon	5–2	9 January 2013
(Indonesia) Zulham Zamrun	Mitra Kukar	Sriwijaya	4–2	26 January 2013
(Liberia) Boakay Eddie Foday	Sriwijaya	Persija	4–1	2 February 2013
(Brazil) Alberto Gonçalves	Arema Indonesia	Pelita Bandung Raya	4–2	28 February 2013
(Indonesia) Tantan	Sriwijaya	Gresik United	4–3	1 March 2013
(Indonesia) Yohanes Pahabol	Persipura Jayapura	Mitra Kukar	3–0	13 March 2013
(Senegal) Pape N'Diaye	PSPS	Persela	4–2	16 March 2013
(Mali) Djibril Coulibaly^{4}	Barito Putera	PSPS	5–2	27 April 2013
(Saudi Arabia) Fahad Al-Dossari	Persiram	PSPS	5–0	26 May 2013
(Nigeria) Osas Saha	Persisam Putra	Persidafon	5–1	3 June 2013
(Argentina) Mario Costas	Persela	PSPS	9–1	12 June 2013
(Nigeria) Osas Saha	Persisam Putra	Persiwa	3–1	16 June 2013
(Indonesia) Greg Nwokolo^{4}	Arema Indonesia	PSPS	7–1	4 July 2013
(Indonesia) Patrich Wanggai	Persipura	Persiram Raja Ampat	3–0	4 July 2013
(Indonesia) Rossy Noprihanis	Persepam Madura United	Persiba	3–2	7 July 2013
(Cameroon) Emmanuel Kenmogne	Persija	PSPS	6–0	24 August 2013
(Montenegro) Ilija Spasojević^{5}	Mitra Kukar	PSPS	8–2	15 September 2013
(Chile) Cristian Carrasco	Persita	Persiwa	3–2	18 September 2013

- ^{4} Player scored 4 goals
- ^{5} Player scored 5 goals

=== Scoring ===
- First goal of the season: Dane Milovanović for Pelita Bandung Raya against Barito Putera (5 January 2013)
- Fastest goal of the season: 35 seconds – Rizky Ripora for Barito Putera against Mitra Kukar (21 May 2013)
- Widest winning margin: 8 goals
  - Persela Lamongan 9–1 PSPS Pekanbaru (12 June 2013)
- Highest scoring game: 10 goals
  - Persela Lamongan 9–1 PSPS Pekanbaru (12 June 2013)
  - Mitra Kukar 8–2 PSPS Pekanbaru (15 September 2013)
- Most goals scored in a match by a single team: 9 goals
  - Persela Lamongan 9–1 PSPS Pekanbaru (12 June 2013)
- Most goals scored in a match by a losing team: 3 goals
  - Gresik United 3–4 Sriwijaya (1 March 2013)
  - Persib Bandung 4–3 Pelita Bandung Raya (11 June 2013)
- Widest home winning margin: 8 goals
  - Persela Lamongan 9–1 PSPS Pekanbaru (12 June 2013)
- Widest away winning margin: 6 goals
  - PSPS Pekanbaru 0–6 Persija Jakarta (24 August 2013)
- Most goals scored by a home team: 9 goals
  - Persela Lamongan 9–1 PSPS Pekanbaru (12 June 2013)
- Most goals scored by an away team: 6 goals
  - PSPS Pekanbaru 0–6 Persija Jakarta (24 August 2013)

=== Clean sheets ===
- Most clean sheets: 19
  - Persipura Jayapura
- Fewest clean sheets: 3
  - Pelita Bandung Raya

== Achievement ==
=== Monthly awards ===
The selection is done by a team of Technical Study Group (TSG) which was formed by PT Liga Indonesia. TSG is a part of the High Performance Group (HPG), whose task is to analyze the technical, the whole game Indonesia Super League and also determine individual worthy of the award. The team consists of Joppie Lepel, Yeyen Tumena, Demis Djamaoeddin, and Tommy Welly.

Month	Coach of the Month		Player of the Month		Reference
Month	Coach	Club	Player	Club	Reference
January	(Indonesia) Sartono Anwar	Persisam Putra	(Ivory Coast) Lancine Koné	Persisam Putra	
February	(Indonesia) Rahmad Darmawan	Arema Indonesia	(Brazil) Alberto Gonçalves	Arema Indonesia	
March	(Brazil) Jacksen F. Tiago	Persipura Jayapura	(Indonesia) Boaz Solossa	Persipura Jayapura	
April	(Indonesia) Djajang Nurdjaman	Persib Bandung	(Indonesia) Patrich Wanggai	Persipura Jayapura	
May	(Indonesia) Benny Dollo	Persija Jakarta	(Liberia) Zah Rahan Krangar	Persipura Jayapura	
June	(Brazil) Jacksen F. Tiago	Persipura Jayapura	(Indonesia) Sergio van Dijk	Persib Bandung	
July	(Brazil) Jacksen F. Tiago	Persipura Jayapura	(Indonesia) Boaz Solossa	Persipura Jayapura	
August	(Sweden) Stefan Hansson	Mitra Kukar	(Ivory Coast) Lancine Koné	Persisam Putra	

=== Season award ===
The selection is done by a team of Technical Study Group (TSG).

Award	Names	Clubs	Reference
Coach of the Year	(Brazil) Jacksen F. Tiago	Persipura Jayapura	
Most Valuable Player	(Indonesia) Boaz Solossa	Persipura Jayapura	
Young Player of the Year	(Indonesia) Syakir Sulaiman	Persiba Balikpapan	
Best Goalkeeper	(South Korea) Yoo Jae-hoon	Persipura Jayapura	
Top Scorer Award	(Indonesia) Boaz Solossa	Persipura Jayapura	

== Attendances ==
Pos	Team	Total	High	Low	Average	Change
1	Arema Indonesia	429,830	40,002	9,142	25,284	+59.3%
2	Persib Bandung	363,893	26,857	10,567	21,405	+24.0%
3	Persipura Jayapura	319,400	24,858	8,678	18,788	+22.2%
4	Sriwijaya	282,439	32,200	2,234	16,614	−22.0%
5	Persepam Madura United	204,729	16,000	7,500	12,043	n/a^{†}
6	Persisam Putra Samarinda	180,063	14,835	5,267	10,592	−11.0%
7	Persela Lamongan	171,000	13,700	1,000	10,059	−4.7%
8	Gresik United	158,370	17,701	1,530	9,316	−38.4%
9	Persija Jakarta	146,911	21,463	0	8,642	−39.9%
10	Barito Putera	106,681	10,000	0	6,287	n/a^{†}
11	Persidafon Dafonsoro	95,680	15,000	230	5,628	+14.0%
12	Mitra Kukar	89,482	35,000	1,129	5,264	−8.5%
13	Persita Tangerang	76,966	24,587	1,028	4,527	n/a^{†}
14	Persiba Balikpapan	74,802	6,129	3,216	4,400	−0.3%
15	PSPS Pekanbaru	63,116	8,000	273	3,713	−34.6%
16	Persiwa Wamena	37,545	4,873	0	2,209	−69.1%
17	Persiram Raja Ampat	33,554	10,202	540	1,974	−45.3%
18	Pelita Bandung Raya	32,160	15,000	200	1,892	−68.4%
	League total	2,866,621	40,002	0	9,368	−8.4%

Updated to games played on 18 September 2013
Source: Indonesia Super League
Notes:
^{†} Team played previous season in Premier Division.

=== Top 10 Attendances ===
Attendance	Date	Home	Score	Away	Venue	Weekday	Time of Day
40,002	24 February 2013	Arema Indonesia	4–1	Sriwijaya	Kanjuruhan Stadium	Sunday	Evening
39,493	30 June 2013	Arema Indonesia	3–1	Persija Jakarta	Kanjuruhan Stadium	Sunday	Evening
35,000	7 April 2013	Mitra Kukar	1–0	Barito Putera	Aji Imbut Stadium	Sunday	Evening
34,347	31 May 2013	Arema Indonesia	1–0	Persib Bandung	Kanjuruhan Stadium	Friday	Afternoon
33,001	1 September 2013	Arema Indonesia	1–1	Barito Putera	Kanjuruhan Stadium	Sunday	Evening
32,816	12 May 2013	Arema Indonesia	1–2	Persipura Jayapura	Kanjuruhan Stadium	Sunday	Evening
32,811	14 April 2013	Arema Indonesia	2–0	Persela Lamongan	Kanjuruhan Stadium	Sunday	Evening
32,200	20 April 2013	Sriwijaya	0–2	Persipura Jayapura	Gelora Sriwijaya Stadium	Saturday	Evening
29,591	13 January 2013	Arema Indonesia	3–0	Persiram Raja Ampat	Kanjuruhan Stadium	Sunday	Afternoon
29,493	3 February 2013	Arema Indonesia	3–1	Mitra Kukar	Kanjuruhan Stadium	Sunday	Evening
