= Fahad Al-Dossari =

Fahad Al-Dossari may refer to:

- Fahad Al-Dossari (footballer, born 1987)
- Fahad Al-Dossari (footballer, born 1990)
- Fahad Al-Dossari (footballer, born 2002)
