= Kyung-min =

Name list

- Hangul: 경민
- RR: Gyeongmin
- MR: Kyŏngmin

Kyung-min, also spelled Kyoung-min, Gyeong-min, or Kyong-min, is a Korean given name.

People with this name include:

- Hong Kyung-min (born Hong Seong-min, 1976), South Korean singer and actor
- Ra Kyung-min (born 1976), South Korean badminton player
- Yoon Kyung-min (born 1979), South Korean handball player
- Ko Kyung-min (born 1987), South Korean football player
- Hur Kyoung-min (born 1990), South Korean baseball player
- Park Kyung-min (footballer, born 1990), South Korean football player
- Lee Kyungmin (born 2007), South Korean singer, member of TWS

== See also ==
- List of Korean given names
