= Kim Young-kwang =

Kim Young-kwang may refer to:

- Kim Young-kwang (footballer, born 1983), South Korean footballer
- Kim Young-kwang (actor) (born 1987)
- Kim Young-kwang (footballer, born 1987)
