= Fahad Al-Dossari (footballer, born 1990) =

Saudi Arabian footballer

Personal information
- Full name: Fahad Salem Al-Dossari
- Date of birth: May 1, 1990 (age 36)
- Place of birth: Saudi Arabia
- Height: 1.75 m (5 ft 9 in)
- Position: Winger

Youth career
- Al-Qadisiyah

Senior career*
Years	Team	Apps	(Gls)
2009–2012	Al-Qadisiyah	34	(3)
2012–2014	Al-Shabab	5	(0)
2014–2015	Al-Ettifaq	15	(3)
2015–2016	Al-Qadisiyah	4	(0)
- * Club domestic league appearances and goals

Fahad Al-Dossari (Arabic: فهد الدوسري, born 1 May 1990) is a Saudi Arabian footballer who played as a winger for Al-Qadisiyah FC.
