= Kim Sung-yeon =

South Korean footballer

Personal information
- Date of birth: January 30, 1989 (age 37)
- Place of birth: South Korea
- Height: 1.78 m (5 ft 10 in)
- Position: Attacking midfielder

Youth career
- 2003–2006: Oscar Soccer Academy
- 2007: Brasilis FC
- 2008: Figueirense FC

Senior career*
Years	Team	Apps	(Gls)
2009	Gremio Esportivo Juventus	17	(3)
2010	Caxias Futebol Clube	10	(2)
2012	Mokpo City	7	(1)
2013	Persepam Madura United	2	(0)
2013	BBCU F.C.		
- * Club domestic league appearances and goals

- Kim Sung-yeon
- Hangul: 김성연
- RR: Gim Seongyeon
- MR: Kim Sŏngyŏn

Kim Sung-yeon (Korean: 김성연; born 30 January 1989 in South Korea) is a Korean attacking midfielder. He currently plays for BBCU F.C. in the Thai Premier League.

== Football activities ==
Born in Republic of Korea to study in Brazil was Oscar Soccer Academy. Brazilian first division team in 2008 Figueirense FC and signed a full Youth contract. Brazil in 2009, and a formal agreement was Gremio Esportivo Juventus in professional contract 2010, was transferred to Caxias Futebol Clube. Mokpo City2012 South Korea joined the league for the first time entered the league in 2013 Persepam Madura United Indonesia has joined this BBCU F.C. 2013 Thailand joined the League succeeded in being active.
