= Lim Joon-sik =

South Korean footballer (born 1981)

Joon-sik
Personal information
- Full name: Lim Joon-sik
- Date of birth: 13 September 1981 (age 45)
- Place of birth: South Korea
- Height: 1.78 m (5 ft 10 in)
- Position: Defensive midfielder

Senior career*
Years	Team	Apps	(Gls)
2004	Jeonnam Dragons	0	(0)
2005–2010	Hyundai Mipo Dockyard	115	(6)
2010–2012	Sriwijaya	52	(0)
2012–2016	Persipura Jayapura	54	(1)
2016	Barito Putera	7	(0)
- * Club domestic league appearances and goals as of 10 November 2014

Lim Joon-sik or Lim Jun-sik(Korean: 임준식; born 13 September 1981) is a South Korean footballer who play as a defensive midfielder.

== Honours ==
=== Club honours ===
Sriwijaya

- Indonesia Super League (1): 2011–12

Persipura Jayapura

- Indonesia Super League (1): 2013
