= Diego Santos =

Brazilian footballer

Personal information
- Full name: Paulo Diego Messias dos Santos
- Date of birth: August 9, 1988 (age 38)
- Place of birth: Rio de Janeiro, Brazil
- Height: 1.78 m (5 ft 10 in)
- Position: Midfielder

Team information
- Current team: Olímpico

Senior career*
Years	Team	Apps	(Gls)
2011–2012	Sriwijaya	12	(3)
2012–2013	Persiba Balikpapan	18	(7)
2013–2014	PSMS Medan	16	(8)
2016	Semen Padang	12	(0)
2017–2018	Atlantico	1	(0)
2019–2020	Batatais	8	(3)
2020	América	5	(0)
2020–2021	Atlético Acreano	10	(0)
2021–2022	Icasa	20	(2)
2022	→ Jaciobá (loan)	10	(0)
2022–	Olímpico	27	(1)
- * Club domestic league appearances and goals

Paulo Diego Messias dos Santos or Didi (born August 9, 1987) is a Brazilian football player who plays as a midfielder for Olímpico. In 2013 season, he left Indonesian club Persiba Balikpapan after his debut against Sriwijaya F.C. in the opening match of 2013 Indonesia Super League season, he played for 25 minutes before suffering a severe ankle injury in a collision with the opposing team defender.
