= Kim Dong-chan (footballer, born 1981) =

South Korean footballer

Kim Dong-Chan
Personal information
- Full name: Kim Dong-Chan
- Date of birth: December 19, 1981 (age 44)
- Place of birth: South Korea
- Height: 1.80 m (5 ft 11 in)
- Position: Forward

Senior career*
| Years | Team | Apps | (Gls) |
| 2005 | South Korea | | |
| 2006–2007 | Mito HollyHock | 1 | (0) |
| 2011 | PTT Rayong | | |
| 2011–2012 | Thai Port | 8 | (0) |
| 2012 | Persisam Putra Samarinda | 10 | (1) |
| 2013 | Persita Tangerang | 22 | (3) |
| 2014 | PKNS F.C. | 18 | (2) |
- * Club domestic league appearances and goals as of February 14, 2014 ‡ National team caps and goals as of February 14, 2014

Kim Dong-Chan (born December 19, 1981) is a South Korean footballer who plays as a forward. In 2013, he played for Persita Tangerang.

== Club statistics ==
As of 23 June 2012.

| Club performance | | | League | | Cup | | League Cup | | Total | |
| Season | Club | League | Apps | Goals | Apps | Goals | Apps | Goals | Apps | Goals |
| Japan | | | League | | Emperor's Cup | | J.League Cup | | Total | |
|---|---|---|---|---|---|---|---|---|---|---|
| 2006 | Mito HollyHock | J2 League | 1 | 0 | 0 | 0 | 0 | 0 | 1 | 0 |
| 2007 | Mito HollyHock | J2 League | 0 | 0 | 0 | 0 | 0 | 0 | 0 | 0 |
| Thailand | | | League | | Queen's Cup | | League Cup | | Total | |
| 2011 | PTT Rayong | Division 1 | ? | ? | ? | ? | ? | ? | ? | ? |
| 2011 | Thai Port | Premier League | 8 | 0 | ? | ? | ? | ? | 8 | 0 |
| Indonesia | | | League | | Piala Indonesia | | League Cup | | Total | |
| 2011–12 | Persisam Putra Samarinda | Super League | 10 | 1 | - | | - | | 10 | 1 |
| 2013 | Persita Tangerang | Super League | 0 | 0 | - | | - | | 0 | 0 |
| Country | Japan | | 1 | 0 | 0 | 0 | 0 | 0 | 1 | 0 |
| Country | Thailand | | 8 | 0 | ? | ? | ? | ? | 8 | 0 |
| Country | Indonesia | | 10 | 1 | - | | - | | 10 | 1 |
| Total | | | 19 | 1 | 0 | 0 | 0 | 0 | 19 | 1 |
