= Na Byung-yul =

South Korean footballer (born 1985)

Personal information
- Date of birth: 5 January 1985 (age 41)
- Place of birth: Busan, South Korea
- Height: 1.81 m (5 ft 11 1/2 in)
- Position: Midfielder

Youth career
- Kwangmoon High School
- Hongik University

Senior career*
Years	Team	Apps	(Gls)
2005–2008	Busan I'Park FC	25	(2)
2008–2009	Police FC	12	(1)
2009–2010	Persik Kediri	15	(2)
2010–2011	Batavia Union	17	(3)
2011–2013	Persita Tangerang	23	(2)

International career
2004	South Korea U20	0	(0)
Korean name
Hangul	나병율
Hanja	羅炳律
RR	Na Byeongyul
MR	Na Pyŏngyul
- * Club domestic league appearances and goals as of 5 June 2013

Na Byung-yul (Korean: 나병율; born 5 January 1985) is a South Korean former footballer who plays as a midfielder.

== Club career ==
Following completion of his university studies, Na joined K-League club Busan I'Park FC. He was then loaned to the National Police Agency FC while he fulfilled his military obligations. Following the completion of his military service, he returned to Busan, but shortly thereafter was released by the club. Na moved to the Indonesian club Persik Kediri for the 2009–10 Indonesia Super League season. After Persik Kediri was relegated to the Liga Indonesia Premier Division at the conclusion of the season, Na shifted to Batavia United FC, specifically formed to participate in the newly established 2011 Liga Primer Indonesia. Currently, he is active in 2013 Indonesia Super League Persita Tangerang.

== National team ==
Na was called up to the South Korea U-19 squad in October 2004, which was due to play a friendly against Japan. However, he ultimately was not used in the match.
