= Gusripen Efendi =

Indonesian footballer

Gusripen
Personal information
- Full name: Gusripen Efendi
- Date of birth: 14 August 1986 (age 40)
- Place of birth: Muara Mahat, Kampar Regency, Riau, Indonesia
- Height: 1.75 m (5 ft 9 in)
- Position: Midfielder

Senior career*
| Years | Team | Apps | (Gls) |
| 2008–2011 | Semen Padang | | |
| 2011–2013 | PSPS Pekanbaru | 14 | (0) |
| 2014–2015 | Persita Tangerang | 10 | (0) |
| 2015 | Persis Solo | 0 | (0) |
| 2016 | PSP Padang | 14 | (1) |
| 2017–2018 | Cilegon United | 18 | (0) |
- * Club domestic league appearances and goals

Gusripen Efendi (born 14 August 1986 in Muara Mahat, Kampar Regency) is an Indonesian former footballer.

== Club statistics ==
| Club | Season | Super League | | Premier Division | | Piala Indonesia | | Total | |
| Club | Season | Apps | Goals | Apps | Goals | Apps | Goals | Apps | Goals |
|---|---|---|---|---|---|---|---|---|---|
| Semen Padang F.C. | 2010-11 | 1 | 0 | - | | - | | 1 | 0 |
| PSPS Pekanbaru | 2011-12 | 14 | 0 | - | | - | | 14 | 0 |
| Total | | 15 | 0 | - | | - | | 15 | 0 |
