= Lee Soung-yong =

South Korean footballer

Lee Soung-Yong
Personal information
- Full name: Lee Soung-Yong
- Date of birth: 16 January 1988 (age 38)
- Place of birth: Seoul, South Korea
- Height: 1.85 m (6 ft 1 in)
- Positions: Midfielder; centre-back

Senior career*
Years	Team	Apps	(Gls)
2010–2011	Incheon United	22	(1)
2011–2012	PSAP Sigli	26	(2)
2012–2013	Persiram Raja Ampat	18	(1)
2014	PTT Rayong	19	(0)
- * Club domestic league appearances and goals as of 11 June 2012 ‡ National team caps and goals as of 3 March 2012

Lee Soung-Yong (Korean: 이성용; born 16 January 1988) is a South Korean footballer.

Lee played in Indonesia Super League with PSAP Sigli, and later with Persiram Raja Ampat. He later played in the Thai Premier League with PTT Rayong.
