= Paolo Frangipane =

Argentine footballer

Personal information
- Full name: Paolo Daniel Frangipane
- Date of birth: July 11, 1979 (age 47)
- Place of birth: Buenos Aires, Argentina
- Height: 1.68 m (5 ft 6 in)
- Position: Midfielder

Senior career*
Years	Team	Apps	(Gls)
1996–2000	Deportivo Español	53	(15)
2000–2002	Tigre	56	(15)
2002–2003	Los Andes	37	(6)
2003–2004	Gimnasia de Jujuy	37	(15)
2004–2005	Huracán TA	21	(0)
2005–2006	Belgrano	61	(12)
2007–2008	Deportivo Cali	64	(10)
2008	Belgrano	17	(4)
2009	→ CFR Cluj (loan)	3	(0)
2009–2010	Aldosivi	38	(7)
2010	Olympiacos Volos	2	(0)
2011	Huachipato	30	(8)
2012	Deportes Tolima	6	(0)
2012–2013	Mitra Kukar	25	(7)
2014	Deportivo Español	21	(2)
2014–2015	Camioneros	11	(3)
2015–2020	SAT	9	(0)
Total		491	(104)
- * Club domestic league appearances and goals as of 27 March 2018

Paolo Daniel Frangipane (born 11 July 1979 in Buenos Aires) is an Argentine former football midfielder.

== Career ==
He made his professional debut in 1996, with Deportivo Español of Argentina in an away match against Argentinos Juniors, which they lost 1–0. He was brought to Deportivo Cali in 2007, by then-manager, Omar Labruna of Argentina.

He came to CFR Cluj from the Argentine sports club Belgrano on 9 January 2009.

After playing professionally in Argentina, Greece and Romania, Frangipane signed with Chilean club Huachipato in 2011. The next year, he signed with Colombia's Deportes Tolima in January 2012.

In October 2012 Frangipane joined the Indonesia Super League clubs, Mitra Kukar. In February 2014, he returned to Argentina and joined Deportivo Español in the Primera C.
