= Christopher Gomez =

Australian footballer

Christopher Gómez
Personal information
- Full name: Christopher Elliot Gómez
- Date of birth: 15 March 1989 (age 37)
- Place of birth: Perth, Australia
- Height: 1.80 m (5 ft 11 in)
- Position: Forward

Senior career*
Years	Team	Apps	(Gls)
2007–2008	Marconi Stallions	19	(12)
2008–2009	Penrith Nepean United	21	(15)
2009–2011	Macarthur Rams	18	(9)
2011–2013	Blacktown Spartans	20	(11)
2013–2014	Persepam Madura United	12	(1)
2014–2015	St George Saints	21	(1)
2015–2017	Bankstown City	69	(25)
2018–2020	Albion Park White Eagles	31	(9)
2021–2022	Bellambi Rosellas	22	(3)
Total		233	(86)
- * Club domestic league appearances and goals

Christopher Gómez (born 15 March 1989) is an Australian former football player who currently plays for Persepam Madura United in Indonesia Super League. He is a left foot player who can play both as striker, behind the striker or attacking midfield and can also play from the left wing.
