= Fabrício Bastos =

Brazilian footballer (born 1981)

Fabricio Bastos
Personal information
- Full name: Fabricio Bastos Pereira
- Date of birth: September 19, 1981 (age 45)
- Place of birth: Rio de Janeiro, Brazil
- Height: 1.76 m (5 ft 9 1/2 in)
- Position: Midfielder

Senior career*
Years	Team	Apps	(Gls)
2004−2006	Persema Malang		
2008–2009	PSMS Medan	12	(2)
2013−2014	Persita Tangerang	1	(1)
- * Club domestic league appearances and goals as of 26 May 2013

Fabricio Bastos Pereira (born in Rio de Janeiro on September 19, 1981) is a Brazilian football player currently play for Persita Tangerang in the Indonesia Super League.
