= Franck Bezi =

Ivorian footballer (born 1988)

Edu
Personal information
- Full name: Franck Edouard Bezi
- Date of birth: December 28, 1988 (age 37)
- Place of birth: Ivory Coast
- Height: 1.90 m (6 ft 3 in)
- Position: Defender

Senior career*
Years	Team	Apps	(Gls)
2005–2006	Satellite d'Abidjan	20	(5)
2006–2007	Club Sfaxien	16	(0)
2007–2009	Widad de Fez	19	(2)
2009–2012	Saint-Georges	44	(8)
2012–2014	Puskas Academy	36	(12)
2014–2017	Persiba	27	(3)
2018–2020	Yanga s/c	32	(15)
- * Club domestic league appearances and goals as of 01 dec 2014

Franck Edouard Bezi or Edu (born December 28, 1988) is an Ivorian footballer who plays as a defender. He has played in his native Ivory Coast, as well as Indonesia.
