= Abu Bakar Sillah =

Australian footballer

Aboubakar Sillah
Personal information
- Full name: Aboubakar Sillah
- Date of birth: 25 July 1989 (age 37)
- Place of birth: Australia
- Height: 1.89 m (6 ft 2 1/2 in)
- Position: Defender

Senior career*
Years	Team	Apps	(Gls)
2011	Stanmore Hawks		
2012	Belmore United		
2013−2014	Persepam Madura United	27	(0)
- * Club domestic league appearances and goals as of 20 April 2014

Aboubakar Sillah (born 25 July 1989) is an Australian football player who currently plays for Persepam Madura United in Indonesia Super League.
