= Daryoush Ayyoubi =

Iranian footballer (born 1980)

Personal information
- Full name: Daryoush Ayyoubi
- Date of birth: 30 August 1980 (age 46)
- Place of birth: Karaj, Iran
- Height: 1.93 m (6 ft 4 in)
- Position: Striker

Senior career*
Years	Team	Apps	(Gls)
1999–2001	Palayeshgahe Esfahan	24	(28)
2001–2002	Bimeh Iran	14	(14)
2002–2003	Esteghlal	8	(6)
2003–2005	Pasargad Tehran	20	(9)
2005–2006	Sorkhpooshan Delvar Afzar	12	(7)
2006–2008	Tarbiat Yazd	41	(27)
2008–2009	Naft Tehran	11	(18)
2009–2010	PSM Makassar	12	(8)
2011–2013	Arema Indonesia	25	(11)
2014–2015	Persiram Raja Ampat	23	(17)
Total		190	(145)
- * Club domestic league appearances and goals

Daryoush Ayyoubi (Persian: داریوش ایوبی; born 30 August 1980) is an Iranian former footballer who plays as a striker.
