= Edemar Garcia =

Australian-Angolan footballer

Personal information
- Full name: Eguerreiro Vata Garcia Edemar
- Date of birth: 13 June 1986 (age 40)
- Place of birth: Australia
- Height: 1.78 m (5 ft 10 in)
- Position: Midfielder

Senior career*
Years	Team	Apps	(Gls)
2013	Arema Cronous	4	(0)
- * Club domestic league appearances and goals as of 18 June 2013

Eguerreiro Vata Garcia Edemar (born 13 June 1986), simply known as Edemar Garcia, is an Australian footballer with Angolan descent.

He is the son of Angolan international player and former Gelora Dewata player Vata Matanu Garcia.
