= Jafad Moradi =

Iranian footballer

Personal information
- Date of birth: April 14, 1984 (age 42)
- Place of birth: Tehran, Iran
- Height: 1.80 m (5 ft 11 in)
- Position: Midfielder

Senior career*
Years	Team	Apps	(Gls)
2004−2007	Naft Tehran	28	(1)
2007–2011	Saipa	56	(3)
2011–2012	Bandung F.C.	18	(4)
2012−2013	Persidafon Dafonsoro	22	(3)
2013−2014	Persita Tangerang	20	(2)
2014−2015	Persis Solo	14	(1)
- * Club domestic league appearances and goals as of 20 March 2013

Jafad Moradi (born April 14, 1984) is an Iranian former footballer who plays as a midfielder.
