= Sékou Camara (footballer, born 1985) =

Malian footballer

Personal information
- Full name: Abdoulaye Sékou Camara
- Date of birth: 17 November 1985
- Place of birth: Bamako, Mali
- Date of death: 27 July 2013 (aged 27)
- Place of death: Bandung, West Java, Indonesia
- Height: 1.83 m (6 ft 0 in)
- Position: Forward

Senior career*
Years	Team	Apps	(Gls)
2008−2009	Centre Salif Keita		
2009−2010	Jomo Cosmos	17	(5)
2010−2011	Engen Santos	10	(2)
2011−2012	PSAP Sigli	30	(12)
2013	Persiwa Wamena	15	(10)
2013	Pelita Bandung Raya	9	(1)

International career^{‡}
2009	Mali	1	(1)
- * Club domestic league appearances and goals as of 21 July 2013 ‡ National team caps and goals as of 24 April 2012

Abdoulaye Sékou Camara (17 November 1985 – 27 July 2013), better known as Sékou Camara, was a Malian footballer. Nicknamed "McCarthy", Camara primarily played as a striker and as a centre forward. At the time of his death, he was a striker for Pelita Bandung Raya.

== Death ==
Sékou Camara died of a sudden heart attack while training with his teammates on 27 July 2013 at the Siliwangi Stadium in Bandung, West Java, Indonesia, at the age of 27.

== See also ==
- List of association football players who died during their careers
