= Ha Dae-won =

South Korean footballer (born 1985)

Personal information
- Full name: Ha Dae-won (하대원)
- Date of birth: April 28, 1985 (age 41)
- Place of birth: Seoul, South Korea
- Height: 1.88 m (6 ft 2 in)
- Position: Defender

Senior career*
Years	Team	Apps	(Gls)
2011−2012	Zeyashwemye		
2013−2014	Barito Putera	41	(0)
2015	Bali United	0	(0)
2016	Sime Darby FC	0	(0)
- * Club domestic league appearances and goals as of 13 January 2015

Ha Dae-won (Korean: 하대원; born April 28, 1985) is a South Korean football player who is former player of Barito Putera since 2013 to 2014 in the Indonesia Super League.

== Career ==
In January 2015, he joined Bali United. He is out from Sime Darby F.C. in November 2016.
