= Mostafa El Qasaa =

Lebanese footballer

Personal information
- Full name: Mostafa El Qasaa
- Date of birth: 25 April 1982 (age 44)
- Place of birth: Lebanon
- Height: 1.80 m (5 ft 11 in)
- Position: Striker

Senior career*
| Years | Team | Apps | (Gls) |
| 2013 | Persiba Balikpapan | 24 | (3) |
| 2014–2017 | Tripoli | 40 | (7) |
| Total | | 64 | (10) |
- * Club domestic league appearances and goals

Mostafa El Qasaa (Arabic: مصطفى القصعة; born 25 April 1982) is a Lebanese former footballer who played as a striker.
