= Roman Golian =

Slovak footballer

Personal information
- Full name: Roman Golian
- Date of birth: 30 July 1982 (age 44)
- Place of birth: Czechoslovakia
- Height: 1.87 m (6 ft 1 1/2 in)
- Position: Defender

Senior career*
Years	Team	Apps	(Gls)
1999−2003	Dukla Banská Bystrica		
2002−2003	→ Petrochemia Dubová (loan)		
2003−2004	Dunajská Lužná		
2005−2006	Dong Nai	16	(1)
2006−2011	LAFC Lučenec	67	(2)
2011−2012	Arema Indonesia	18	(1)
2012−2015	Persela Lamongan	88	(9)
2015−2016	Persiba Balikpapan	20	(0)
- * Club domestic league appearances and goals

Roman Golian (born 30 July 1982) is a Slovak football player who last played for Persiba Balikpapan in the Indonesia Super League.

== Career ==
In December 2014, he signed with Persiba. Before joining Persiba, he played for Persela Lamongan, Arema Indonesia and FK LAFC Lučenec.
