= Henry Njobi Elad =

Cameroonian footballer

Henry Njobi
Personal information
- Full name: Henry Njobi Elad
- Date of birth: June 10, 1985 (age 41)
- Place of birth: Yaoundé, Cameroon
- Height: 1.88 m (6 ft 2 in)
- Position: Defender

Senior career*
Years	Team	Apps	(Gls)
2008−2009	PSPS Pekanbaru		
2009−2010	PSM Makassar	16	(0)
2010−2011	Persekam Metro	21	(1)
2011−2013	Barito Putera	52	(6)
2014	Martapura FC	10	(0)
2016	Perseru Serui	11	(0)
- * Club domestic league appearances and goals as of 15 June 2014

Henry Njobi Elad (born June 10, 1985) is a Cameroonian former footballer who plays as a defender. He previously plays for Indonesian club, Perseru Serui in the 2016 season.

== Honours ==
=== Club honours ===
Barito Putera

- Liga Indonesia Premier Division (1): 2011-12

== Honours ==
•Champions:

Indonesian Premier Division 2011-2012

Clubs: PS Barito Putera.
