= Vali Khorsandipish =

Iranian footballer

Personal information
- Full name: Vali Khorsandipish Kenari
- Date of birth: 25 January 1980 (age 46)
- Place of birth: Tehran, Iran
- Height: 1.95 m (6 ft 5 in)
- Position: Defender

Senior career*
Years	Team	Apps	(Gls)
2004–2007	Rah Ahan	32	(5)
2007–2009	Tarbiat Yazd	37	(0)
2009–2010	Persitara North Jakarta	16	(1)
2010–2012	Naft Masjed Soleyman	29	(2)
2012–2013	Persiwa Wamena	18	(2)
2013–2014	Sriwijaya	12	(0)
2014–2015	Pro Duta	13	(0)
- * Club domestic league appearances and goals as of 1 June 2013

Vali Khorsandipish Kenari (born 25 January 1980) is an Iranian footballer who plays as a defender.
