= Maxwell (footballer, born 1986) =

Brazilian footballer

Personal information
- Full name: Max Suel da Cruz
- Date of birth: 29 October 1986 (age 40)
- Place of birth: Várzea Paulista, São Paulo, Brazil
- Height: 1.80 m (5 ft 11 in)
- Position: Striker

Senior career*
Years	Team	Apps	(Gls)
2005–2006	Grêmio Barueri		
2008	Paulista		
2009	Citizen	11	(1)
2009–2010	Cesarense		
2011	Hong Kong Rangers		
2012	Al-Nabi Shayth		
2013	Persiwa Wamena	10	(2)
- * Club domestic league appearances and goals as of 1 June 2013

Max Suel da Cruz or Maxwell (born October 29, 1986) is a Brazilian former footballer.
