= Pape Latyr N'Diaye (footballer, born 1985) =

Senegalese footballer

Personal information
- Full name: Pape Latyr N'Diaye
- Date of birth: April 4, 1985 (age 41)
- Place of birth: Dakar, Senegal
- Height: 1.88 m (6 ft 2 in)
- Position: Striker

Senior career*
| Years | Team | Apps | (Gls) |
| 2003−2004 | Dakar UC | | |
| 2004−2006 | ASO Chlef | 40 | (9) |
| 2006−2007 | KAC Marrakech | | |
| 2007−2009 | Difaa El Jadida | | |
| 2009−2010 | Al Dhafra FC | | |
| 2010−2011 | Haras El-Hodood | 19 | (3) |
| 2012−2013 | PSPS Pekanbaru | 13 | (7) |
| 2013−2014 | Persidafon Dafonsoro | 14 | (11) |
| 2014−2015 | Gresik United | 10 | (1) |

International career
| 2005 | Senegal U20 | | |
- * Club domestic league appearances and goals as of 12 May 2013

Pape Latyr N'Diaye (born April 4, 1985) is a Senegalese former footballer who plays as a striker.
