= Han Sang-min =

South Korean footballer (born 1985)

Han Sang-Min 한상민
Personal information
- Full name: Han Sang-Min
- Date of birth: 10 March 1985 (age 41)
- Place of birth: Nonsan, South Chungcheong Province, South Korea
- Height: 1.85 m (6 ft 1 in)
- Positions: Midfielder; defender

Team information
- Current team: Dangjin Citizen (Head Coach)

Senior career*
Years	Team	Apps	(Gls)
2004–2008	Suwon Bluewings	0	(0)
2009	Yesan FC	13	(3)
2009–2010	Ulsan Hyundai	8	(0)
2011	Persema Malang	10	(1)
2012	Daejeon KHNP	5	(0)
2013	Persela Lamongan	20	(2)

Managerial career
- 2013–2020: Shinpyeong High School
- 2021–: Dangjin Citizen
- * Club domestic league appearances and goals

Han Sang-Min (Korean: 한상민; Hanja: 韓相旻; born 10 March 1985) is a South Korean former footballer, currently manager of Dangjin Citizen.

On 22 July 2009, Han signed for K-League side Ulsan Hyundai. In 2011, he joined Persema in Liga Primer Indonesia.

On 2021, He appointed by Dangjin Citizen as head coach.
