= Jacques Joel Tsimi =

Cameroonian footballer

Joel Tsimi
Personal information
- Full name: Jacques Joel Tsimi
- Date of birth: 9 January 1984 (age 42)
- Place of birth: Cameroon
- Height: 1.86 m (6 ft 1 in)
- Position: Defender

Senior career*
Years	Team	Apps	(Gls)
2008–2009	Sriwijaya FC	28	(1)
2009–2011	Persisam Putra Samarinda	55	(1)
2011–2012	PSPS Pekanbaru	18	(1)
2012–2013	Persisam Putra Samarinda	15	(0)
2013–2015	Persikabo Bogor	32	(0)
- * Club domestic league appearances and goals

Jacques Joel Tsimi or Joel Tsimi (born 9 January 1984) is a Cameroonian footballer who currently plays as defender.

== Honours ==
Sriwijaya FC

- Copa Indonesia: 2008–09
