= Park Kyung-min (footballer, born 1990) =

South Korean footballer

Park Kyung-Min
Personal information
- Full name: Park Kyung-Min (박경민)
- Date of birth: August 22, 1990 (age 36)
- Place of birth: Cheonan, South Korea
- Height: 1.75 m (5 ft 9 in)
- Position: Winger

Senior career*
Years	Team	Apps	(Gls)
2010–2012	Cheonan City	28	(7)
2012–2013	Persija Jakarta	25	(5)
2013–2014	Pelita Bandung Raya	26	(7)
- * Club domestic league appearances and goals as of 28 April 2013

Park Kyung-Min (박경민 : born August 22, 1990) is a South Korean footballer who plays as a winger.
