= Fahad Al-Dossari (footballer, born 1987) =

Saudi Arabian footballer

Personal information
- Full name: Fahad Khaled Al-Dossari
- Date of birth: 17 February 1987 (age 39)
- Place of birth: Saudi Arabia
- Height: 1.76 m (5 ft 9 1/2 in)
- Positions: Forward; winger

Senior career*
Years	Team	Apps	(Gls)
2010−2011	Al-Faisaly		
2011−2012	Al-Qadisiyah		
2013−2014	Persiram Raja Ampat	15	(4)
2014–2015	Al-Hazem		
- * Club domestic league appearances and goals as of 26 May 2013

Fahad Khaled Al-Dossari (Arabic: فهد خالد الدوسري; born 17 February 1987) is a Thailand−Saudi Arabian former footballer who plays as a striker. He was born in Thailand to an Arabian father and a Thai mother.

== Club career ==
On 10 May 2013, Al-Dossari joined Indonesian football club side Persiram Raja Ampat. He made his debut for Persiram against PSPS Pekanbaru on 26 May 2013 where he scored his first goals completing a hat-trick in a 5–0 win.
