= Kim Young-kwang (footballer, born 1987) =

South Korean footballer

Kim Young-kwang 김영광
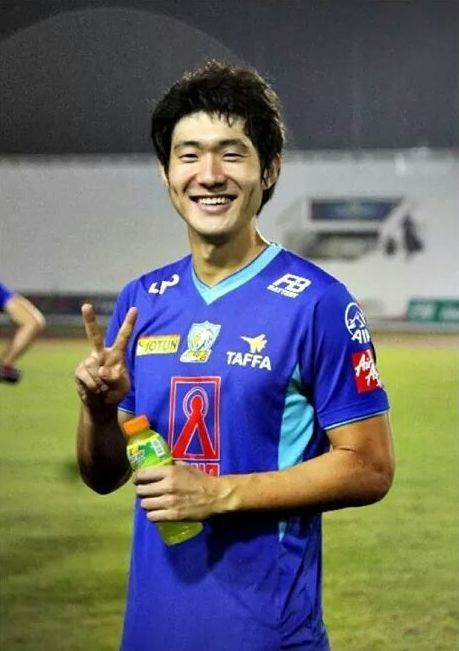

Personal information
- Full name: Kim Young-kwang
- Date of birth: 20 June 1987 (age 39)
- Place of birth: South Korea
- Height: 1.90 m (6 ft 3 in)
- Position: Striker

Youth career
- 2006–2009: Suwon University

Senior career*
Years	Team	Apps	(Gls)
2010	Suwon		
2011	Balestier Khalsa	33	(8)
2012	Air Force Central F.C.		
2012	BBCU		
2013–2014	Persiba Balikpapan	18	(3)
2015–2016	Korean Army		
2017	Lamphun Warrior F.C.		
- * Club domestic league appearances and goals as of 04 October 2017

- Kim Young-kwang
- Hangul: 김영광
- Hanja: 金榮光
- RR: Gim Yeonggwang
- MR: Kim Yŏnggwang

Kim Young-kwang (Korean: 김영광; born 20 June 1987) is a South Korean football player who plays as a striker.
