= Indonesia national football team results (unofficial matches) =

Football results

This article provides details of unofficial football games played by the Indonesia national football team. All the games listed were not accorded the status of FIFA's official International A Matches.

== Unofficial friendly matches against FIFA members ==
Key
Win
Draw
Defeat

=== 1953 ===
26 April Unofficial friendly	Hong Kong	2–3	Indonesia	Mong Kok, Hong Kong
--:-- UTC+8	McGregor 14'; Lau Yee 59' (pen.)	Report	Ramang 17', 37'; Darmadi 68'

=== 1956 ===
16 November Unofficial friendly	Indonesia	7–5	United States	Djakarta, Indonesia
--:-- UTC+8	Jusron 3', 54', 66'; Danoe 22', 39'; Sian Liong 37'; Ramang 75'	Report	Looby 6'; Zerhusen 35', 50', 62' (pen.), 70'	Stadium: Ikada Stadium; Referee: Christiaan H. Wensveen (Indonesia)

=== 1968 ===
29 August Unofficial friendly	Indonesia	3–1	India	Singapore
--:-- UTC+8	Kadir 30'; Sihasale 52'; Komar Chaeruddin 80'		Naemuddin 10'

=== 1972 ===
20 June 1972 Jakarta Anniversary Tournament Final	Indonesia	5–2	South Korea	Jakarta, Indonesia
--:-- UTC+7	Risdianto 14', 49'; Abdul Kadir 16', 51' (pen.); Idris 43'			Stadium: Gelora Senayan Main Stadium

20 November 1972 King's Cup	Indonesia	1–2	Singapore	Bangkok, Thailand
--:-- UTC+7

22 November 1972 King's Cup	Indonesia	1–1	South Korea	Bangkok, Thailand
--:-- UTC+7

24 November 1972 King's Cup	Thailand	3–0	Indonesia	Bangkok, Thailand
--:-- UTC+7

26 November 1972 King's Cup	Malaysia	2–0	Indonesia	Bangkok, Thailand
--:-- UTC+7

=== 1974 ===
19 April Unofficial friendly	Indonesia	2–1	Uruguay	Jakarta, Indonesia
--:-- UTC+7	Kadir 10'; Asmara 63'	id:Indonesia vs Uruguay (1974)	Silva 75'	Stadium: Gelora Senayan Stadium; Attendance: 60,000; Referee: Ruslan Hatta (Indonesia)

30 July 1974 Merdeka Tournament	South Korea	0–0	Indonesia	Kuala Lumpur, Malaysia
--:-- UTC+8				Stadium: Stadium Merdeka

=== 1975 ===
4 October Unofficial friendly	New Zealand	0–8	Indonesia	Christchurch, New Zealand
--:-- UTC+11

=== 1976 ===
9 June 1976 Jakarta Anniversary Tournament	Indonesia	2–2	South Korea	Jakarta, Indonesia
--:-- UTC+7	Waskito 48'; Timo Kapisa 52'		Kang Byung-chan 21'; Cho Dong-hyun 42'	Stadium: Gelora Senayan Main Stadium

=== 1978 ===
16 June 1978 Jakarta Anniversary Tournament	Indonesia	1–1	South Korea	Jakarta, Indonesia
--:-- UTC+7	Goal	Report	Park Chang-sun 28'	Stadium: Gelora Senayan Main Stadium

24 June 1978 Jakarta Anniversary Tournament Final	Indonesia	1–3	South Korea	Jakarta, Indonesia
--:-- UTC+7	Kadir		Park Young-jo; Park Chang-ho	Stadium: Gelora Senayan Main Stadium

=== 1981 ===
24 February Unofficial friendly	Indonesia	2–0	Japan	Jakarta, Indonesia
--:-- UTC+7				Stadium: Gelora Senayan Main Stadium

=== 1982 ===
8 August 1982 Merdeka Tournament	South Korea	4–0	Indonesia	Kuala Lumpur, Malaysia
--:-- UTC+8	Goal	Report		Stadium: Stadium Merdeka

13 October 1982 Merlion Cup	South Korea	1–0	Indonesia	Singapore
--:-- UTC+8	Goal	Report		Stadium: Singapore National Stadium

=== 1983 ===
10 June 1983 President's Cup	Indonesia	1–2	Nigeria	Busan, South Korea
16:30 UTC+9				Stadium: Busan Gudeok Stadium

=== 1986 ===
10 August 1986 Independence Cup	Indonesia	3–0	Singapore	Jakarta, Indonesia
	Kabo 10'; Lubis 48'; Yacobi 88'	Report		Stadium: Senayan Stadium

=== 1987 ===
4 August 1987 Independence Cup	Indonesia	2–1	Algeria	Jakarta, Indonesia
	Yacobi 6'; Waidi 52'	Report	Benabou 76'	Stadium: Senayan Stadium

6 August 1987 Independence Cup	South Korea	1–1	Indonesia	Jakarta, Indonesia
	Sim Kyu-sun 10'	Report	Yacobi 46'	Stadium: Senayan Stadium

9 August 1987 Independence Cup Final	Indonesia	2–1 (a.e.t.)	Algeria	Jakarta, Indonesia
	Yacobi 26'; Waidi 103'	Report	Kabrane 89'	Stadium: Senayan Stadium

=== 2002 ===
2 August 2002 LG Cup	Vietnam	3–1	Indonesia	Ho Chi Minh City, Vietnam
	Huỳnh Hồng Sơn 15', 75'; Lê Huỳnh Đức 58'	Report	Kurniawan 20'	Stadium: Thống Nhất Stadium

=== 2007 ===
30 June Unofficial friendly	Indonesia	2–1	Liberia	Palembang, Indonesia
--:-- UTC+7	Bambang 42'; Ponaryo 90' (pen.)	Report	Boakay 45'	Stadium: Gelora Sriwijaya Stadium

=== 2012 ===
17 May 2012 Al Nakba Cup	Mauritania	0–2	Indonesia	Nablus, Palestine
17:00 UTC+2			Bayauw 19'; Fall 24' (o.g.)	Stadium: Nablus Football Stadium; Attendance: 90

22 May 2012 Al Nakba Cup	Palestine	2–1	Indonesia	Hebron, Palestine
19:00 UTC+2	Hussam Abu Saleh 39' (pen.); Fahed Attal 65'	Report	Bachdim 14'	Stadium: Hussein Bin Ali Stadium

14 November Unofficial friendly	Indonesia	1–0	Timor-Leste	Jakarta, Indonesia
15:30 UTC+7	Bambang 67'	Report		Stadium: Gelora Bung Karno Stadium; Attendance: 3,127; Referee: Subkhir Singh (Singapore)

17 November Unofficial friendly	Indonesia	0–0	Cameroon	Jakarta, Indonesia
16.45 UTC+7		Report		Stadium: Gelora Bung Karno Stadium; Attendance: 12,897; Referee: Subkhir Singh (Singapore)

=== 2014 ===
15 May Unofficial friendly	Indonesia	1–1	Dominican Republic	Jakarta, Indonesia
20:45 UTC+7	Tuasalamony 85' (pen.)	Report	Kerbi 24'	Stadium: Gelora Bung Karno Stadium; Attendance: 2,000; Referee: Ho Wai Sing (Hong Kong)

25 June Unofficial friendly	Indonesia	2–0	Nepal	Malang, Indonesia
15:30 UTC+7	Samsul 6'; Hendro 83'	Report		Stadium: Gajayana Stadium; Referee: Oki Dwi Putra (Indonesia)

11 November Unofficial friendly	Indonesia	4–0	Timor-Leste	Jakarta, Indonesia
17:00 UTC+7	van Dijk 10'; Zulham 40'; Evan 42'; Samsul 67'			Stadium: Gelora Bung Karno Stadium; Referee: Oki Dwi Putra (Indonesia)

=== 2017 ===
2 September Unofficial friendly	Indonesia	0–0	Fiji	Bekasi, Indonesia
16:00 UTC+7		Report		Stadium: Patriot Candrabhaga Stadium; Attendance: 17,518; Referee: Spartak Danilenko (Kyrgyzstan)

4 October Unofficial friendly	Indonesia	3–1	Cambodia	Bekasi, Indonesia
21:00 UTC+7	Lerby 32'; Rezaldi 34'; Septian 49'	Report	Vathanaka 48'	Stadium: Patriot Candrabhaga Stadium; Referee: Sukbir Singh (Singapore)

=== 2018 ===
11 January Unofficial friendly	Indonesia	0–6	Iceland	Sleman, Indonesia
18:30 UTC+7		Report	Bjarnason 30'; Finnbogason 47'; Karlsson 66'; Haraldsson 68'; Hermansson 81'; Eyjólfsson 82'	Stadium: Maguwoharjo Stadium; Attendance: 7,000; Referee: Yudai Yamamoto (Japan)

=== 2024 ===
2 January Unofficial friendly	Indonesia	0–4	Libya	Aksu, Turkey
16:00 UTC+3		Report	Krawa'a 25'; Al Khouja 58'; Al-Qulaib 89'; Al Qajdar 90+2'	Stadium: Mardan Sports Complex; Referee: Bahattin Şimşek (Turkey)

9 January Unofficial friendly	Indonesia	0–5	Iran	Al Rayyan, Qatar
18:00 UTC+3		Report	Ghoddos 3'; Cheshmi 22'; Moghanlou 36'; Ghayedi 70', 87'	Stadium: Al-Rayyan Training Ground; Referee: Mohammed Braheh (Qatar)

2 June Unofficial friendly	Indonesia	0–0	Tanzania	Jakarta, Indonesia
16:00 UTC+7		Report		Stadium: Madya Stadium; Attendance: 5,831; Referee: Muhammad Taqi (Singapore)

== Matches against non FIFA members and clubs ==
Key
Win
Draw
Defeat

=== 1950s ===
==== 1952 ====
27 July Hybrid friendly	Indonesia	1–0	South China	Djakarta, Indonesia
--:-- UTC+8	Freddy Timisela 50'	Report		Attendance: 40.000

==== 1953 ====
18 April Hybrid friendly	Manila Football League XI	0–8	Indonesia	Manila, Philippines
--:-- UTC+8		Report	Ramang; Darmadi; Goan

19 April Hybrid friendly	Manila Students XI	0–7	Indonesia	Manila, Philippines
--:-- UTC+8		Report	Ramang; Darmadi; Djamiat

21 April Hybrid friendly	Manila Interport	0–5	Indonesia	Manila, Philippines
--:-- UTC+8		Report	Sugiono; Djamiat; Darmadi; Wim Pie; Ing Hien

25 April Hybrid friendly	Hong Kong Interport	1–4	Indonesia	Hong Kong
--:-- UTC+8	64'	Report	Ramang 17', 59'; Djamiat 40'; San Liong 82'

29 April Hybrid friendly	Chinese XI	1–5	Indonesia	Hong Kong
--:-- UTC+8	Chu Wing-keung 79' (pen.)	Report	Ramang 59', 62', 65'; San Liong 67'; Chaeruddin 90'

2 May Hybrid friendly	Chaisot	2–6	Indonesia	Bangkok, Thailand
--:-- UTC+7		Report

3 May Hybrid friendly	Royal Thai Air Force	0–7	Indonesia	Bangkok, Thailand
--:-- UTC+7		Report

26 August Hybrid friendly	Indonesia	0–2	Yugoslavia B	Djakarta, Indonesia
--:-- UTC+8		Report	Veselinović 66', 85'	Stadium: Ikada Stadium; Attendance: 50,000; Referee: J. Ferguson (Singapore)

==== 1954 ====
22 July Hybrid friendly	Indonesia	0-5	Grazer AK	Djakarta, Indonesia
--:-- UTC+7		Report		Stadium: Ikada Stadium

==== 1955 ====
9 February Hybrid friendly	Indonesia	1–3	Grasshopper	Djakarta, Indonesia
--:-- UTC+7	Ramli Jatim 44'	Report	Ballaman 42'; Vonlanthen 70'; Willy Neukom 83' (pen.)	Stadium: Ikada Stadium

3 July Hybrid friendly	Indonesia	2–2	Austria Salzburg	Yogyakarta, Indonesia
--:-- UTC+7		Report		Stadium: Kridosono Stadium

24 November Hybrid friendly	Indonesia	1–3	Lokomotiv Moskva	Djakarta, Indonesia
--:-- UTC+7	Rukma 77'	Report	Filyayev 30'; Bubukin 75'; Zub 80'	Stadium: Ikada Stadium; Referee: Timakov (Russia)

24 December Hybrid friendly	Indonesia	2–2	Ferroviário	Djakarta, Indonesia
--:-- UTC+7	Ramli 38'; Djamiat 53'	Report	Campelo 8'; Pires 30'	Stadium: Ikada Stadium; Referee: Moh. Sarim (Indonesia)

==== 1956 ====
15 January Hybrid friendly	Indonesia	2–7	Yugoslavia B	Djakarta, Indonesia
--:-- UTC+8	Ramang 40'; Djamiat 67'	Report	Toplak 18'; Liposinović 23'; Mujić 26', 30', 50', 64'; Veselinović 41'	Stadium: Ikada Stadium; Referee: Moh. Sarim (Indonesia)

23 June Hybrid friendly	Indonesia	1–5	Reims	Djakarta, Indonesia
--:-- UTC+8	Witarsa 42'	Report	Templin 18', 21'; Glovacki 35'; Kopa 62', 84'	Stadium: Ikada Stadium; Attendance: 40,000; Referee: Moh. Sarim (Indonesia)

7 July Hybrid friendly	Indonesia	2–3	Reims	Djakarta, Indonesia
--:-- UTC+8	Danoe 82'; Ling Houw 90+3' (pen.)	Report	Templin 50'; Glovacki 65', 73'	Stadium: Ikada Stadium; Referee: Van Yperen (Indonesia)

19 August Hybrid friendly	Neftyanik Baku	3–1	Indonesia	Baku, Soviet Union
--:--	Abilzade 33', 62', 90'	Report	Witarsa 8'

23 August Hybrid friendly	Dinamo Tbilisi	5–2	Indonesia	Tbilisi, Soviet Union
--:--	Kaloev 6', 50'; Khasaya 30'; Gagnidze 63' (?)	Report	Ashari (?); Ramli 86'

26 August Hybrid friendly	Shakhtyor Stalino	2–1	Indonesia	Stalino, Soviet Union
--:--	Sapronov 26'; Fedosov 42'	Report	Witarsa 88'

29 August Hybrid friendly	Avangard Kharkov	2–1	Indonesia	Kharkov, Soviet Union
--:--	Duykov 46'; Levonenko 65'	Report	Dana (?)

1 September Hybrid friendly	Trudovye Rezervy Leningrad	5–2	Indonesia	Leningrad, Soviet Union
--:--		Report

4 September Hybrid friendly	Krasnoye Znamya Ivanovo	0–2	Indonesia	Ivanovo, Soviet Union
--:--		Report	Sian Liong 7'; Ramli 77'

22 September Hybrid friendly	SC Einheit Dresden	4–1	Indonesia	Dresden, East Germany
--:--		Report

22 September Hybrid friendly	Czechoslovakia B	5–1	Indonesia	Plzeň, Czechoslovakia
--:--		Report		Stadium: Stadion města Plzně

==== 1957 ====
08 August Hybrid friendly	Indonesia	0–3	Ferencvárosi TC	Djakarta, Indonesia
--:-- UTC+8			Pál Orosz 19'; Tamás Kertész 32'; Imre Ombódi 70'	Stadium: Ikada Stadium

27 December Djakarta Triangular Tournament	Indonesia	0–2	SC Wacker Wien	Djakarta, Indonesia
--:-- UTC+8		Report		Stadium: Ikada Stadium

29 December Djakarta Triangular Tournament	Indonesia	0–2	Bulgaria B	Djakarta, Indonesia
--:-- UTC+8		Report		Stadium: Ikada Stadium

==== 1958 ====
January Hybrid friendly	Indonesia	0-1	(Czechoslovakia) Rudá Hvězda Bratislava	Djakarta, Indonesia
		Report		Stadium: Ikada Stadium

January Hybrid friendly	Indonesia	3-4	(Czechoslovakia) Rudá Hvězda Bratislava	Djakarta, Indonesia
		Report		Stadium: Ikada Stadium

09 March Hybrid friendly	Indonesia	0–3	Spartak Moscow	Djakarta, Indonesia
--:-- UTC+8				Stadium: Ikada Stadium; Attendance: 30.000

==== 1959 ====
12 May Hybrid friendly	Indonesia	0–3	Saprissa	Djakarta, Indonesia
--:-- UTC+8		Report

29 November Hybrid friendly	Indonesia	1–2	Djurgårdens	Djakarta, Indonesia
--:-- UTC+8		Report

=== 1960s ===
==== 1960 ====
12 November Hybrid friendly	Indonesia	3–5	Alajuelense	Djakarta, Indonesia
--:-- UTC+8		Report

19 November Hybrid friendly	Indonesia	0–5	CSKA Moscow	Djakarta, Indonesia
--:-- UTC+8		Report

==== 1961 ====
23 April Hybrid friendly	Indonesia	1-0	(Brazil) Madureira	Djakarta, Indonesia
--:-- UTC+8		Report

10 October 1961 Aga Khan Gold Cup	Indonesia	6–2	Karachi Municipal Corporation	Dhaka, Pakistan
--:--		Report

12 October 1961 Aga Khan Gold Cup	Victoria SC	0–2	Indonesia	Dhaka, Pakistan
--:--		Report	Dirhamsjah; Frans Jo

16 October 1961 Aga Khan Gold Cup	Indonesia	5–0	Pakistan Western Railway	Dhaka, Pakistan
--:--		Report

18 October 1961 Aga Khan Gold Cup Final	Dhaka Mohammedan	1–2	Indonesia	Dhaka, Pakistan
--:--		Report

28 October Hybrid friendly	South Vietnam U-20	3–1	Indonesia	Saigon, South Vietnam
--:--		Report

29 October Hybrid friendly	South Vietnam Military	1–1	Indonesia	Saigon, South Vietnam
--:--		Report

5 November Hybrid Friendly	Indonesia	0-0	(Soviet Union) Torpedo Moscow	Djakarta, Indonesia
--:-- UTC+8		Report

6 December Hybrid friendly	Indonesia	0–2	Malmö	Djakarta, Indonesia
--:-- UTC+8		Report

==== 1962 ====
July Gelora Senayan Stadium Inauguration	Indonesia	3–2	Indonesia B	Djakarta, Indonesia
--:-- UTC+8		Report		Stadium: Gelora Senayan Main Stadium

22 December Hybrid Friendly	Indonesia	0-2	(Uzbek Soviet Socialist Republic) Pakhtakor	Djakarta, Indonesia
--:-- UTC+8		Report		Stadium: Gelora Senayan Main Stadium; Attendance: 100,000

==== 1963 ====
December Hybrid friendly	Thể Công	1–1	Indonesia	Hanoi, North Vietnam
--:-- UTC+7	Văn Sỹ Chi	Report		Stadium: Hàng Đẫy Stadium

December Hybrid friendly	Indonesia	1–12	Dukla Prague	Djakarta, Indonesia
--:-- UTC+7		Report

==== 1967 ====
14 July Hybrid Friendly	Indonesia	3–0	(Cambodia) ASBA	Singapore
	Djunaedi Abdillah 8' 56'; Kadir 20'	Report		Stadium: Jalan Besar Stadium

==== 1968 ====
20 July Hybrid friendly	Indonesia	4–0	Bangkok Bank F.C.	Djakarta, Indonesia
--:-- UTC+7	M. Basri; Juswardi; Soentoro; Kadir

11 August 1968 Merdeka Cup	Indonesia	7–0	Japan B	Ipoh, Malaysia
--:-- UTC+7	Sihasale 41'; Lesmana 43'; Soentoro 48' 89'; Kadir 65'; Idris 70' 72'

12 August 1968 Merdeka Cup	Indonesia	4–5	Western Australia	Ipoh, Malaysia
--:-- UTC+7	Soentoro 3'; Lesmana 16'; Idris 31'; Sihasale 83'		Jim McIntosh 41'; Henry Lukosek 48' 49'; J. van Oosten 51' 69'

24 August 1968 Merdeka Cup	Indonesia	1–3	Western Australia	Kuala Lumpur, Malaysia
--:-- UTC+7	Idris 88'		J. van Oosten 8'; Kuzowski 15'; Mike Ireson 86'	Stadium: Merdeka Stadium

==== 1969 ====
5 November 1969 Merdeka Cup	Indonesia	3–0	South Korea B	Kuala Lumpur, Malaysia
--:-- UTC+7	Goal		Goal	Stadium: Merdeka Stadium

23 November 1969 King's Cup	Western Australia	1–3	Indonesia	Bangkok, Thailand
--:-- UTC+7	S. Alfred 36'		Soentoro 6' 64'; Timisela 57'

=== 1970s ===
==== 1970 ====
14 February Hybrid friendly	Indonesia	1–1	Csepel SC	Jakarta, Indonesia
--:-- UTC+7	Soentoro 9'		Molzar 30'	Stadium: Gelora Senayan Main Stadium; Attendance: 70.000; Referee: Muhiddin

14 March Hybrid friendly	Indonesia	0–1	Dynamo Moscow	Jakarta, Indonesia
--:-- UTC+7			Larin 65'	Stadium: Gelora Senayan Main Stadium; Attendance: 80.000

29 May Hybrid friendly	Indonesia	2–1	Olaria	Jakarta, Indonesia
--:-- UTC+7	Risdianto 42'; Timisela 74'		Torino 63'	Stadium: Gelora Senayan Main Stadium; Attendance: 60.000

==== 1971 ====
03 March Hybrid friendly	Indonesia	3–1	Boldklubben Frem	Jakarta, Indonesia
--:-- UTC+7	Idris 15'; Kadir 25' 68' (pen.)		Dennis Nielsen 50'	Stadium: Gelora Senayan Main Stadium; Attendance: 40.000; Referee: Lamarju (DKI Jakarta)

20 June Hybrid friendly	Indonesia	0–6	PSV	Jakarta, Indonesia
--:-- UTC+7		Report	Van der Kuijlen; Hiddink; Schmidt Hansen; Mulders; Heijink	Stadium: Gelora Senayan Main Stadium

22 December Hybrid friendly	Indonesia	2–0	Csepel SC	Jakarta, Indonesia
--:-- UTC+7	Idris 20'; Sihasale 62'			Stadium: Gelora Senayan Main Stadium

==== 1972 ====
04 January Hybrid friendly	Indonesia	0–2	Hamburger SV	Jakarta, Indonesia
--:-- UTC+7		Report	Klaus Winkler 16'; Bjørnmose 22'	Stadium: Gelora Senayan Main Stadium

18 February Hybrid friendly	Indonesia	0–0	Odense	Jakarta, Indonesia
--:-- UTC+7				Stadium: Gelora Senayan Main Stadium; Attendance: 25.000

23 February Hybrid friendly	Indonesia	3–6	Dinamo Tbilisi	Jakarta, Indonesia
--:-- UTC+7	Sihasale 48'; Abdul Kadir 58'; Sarman Panggabean 83'		G. Nodia 5' 12'; Asatiani 21' 63' 88'; Kipiani 24'	Stadium: Gelora Senayan Main Stadium; Attendance: 50.000

29 February Hybrid friendly	Indonesia	0–2	Cruzeiro	Jakarta, Indonesia
--:-- UTC+7		Report	Tostão 41' 82'	Stadium: Gelora Senayan Main Stadium; Attendance: 100.000

17 May Hybrid friendly	Indonesia	3–3	Bulgaria B	Jakarta, Indonesia
--:-- UTC+7	Kadir 7' 66' 89' (pen.)		Anton Jordanov 43' 53'; Stevanov 52'	Stadium: Gelora Senayan Main Stadium; Attendance: 30.000

21 May Hybrid friendly	Indonesia	2–2	Partick Thistle	Jakarta, Indonesia
--:-- UTC+7	Waskito 67'; Abdul Kadir 84'		Rae 38' 76'	Stadium: Gelora Senayan Main Stadium; Attendance: 60.000

21 June Hybrid friendly	Indonesia	2–3	Santos	Jakarta, Indonesia
--:-- UTC+7	Risdianto 41', 70'	Report	Jader 5'; Edu 14'; Pelé 30' (pen.)	Stadium: Gelora Senayan Main Stadium; Attendance: 110,000; Referee: Ruslan Hatta (Indonesia)

16 July 1972 Merdeka Tournament	Malaysia B	2–1	Indonesia	Ipoh, Malaysia
--:-- UTC+8	24'; 77'		40'	Stadium: Perak Stadium

1 September Hybrid friendly	Indonesia	2–4	Benfica	Jakarta, Indonesia
--:-- UTC+7	Risdianto 65'; Waskito 84'	Report	Nené 3', 6'; Eusébio 13'; Artur Jorge 27'	Stadium: Gelora Senayan Main Stadium; Attendance: 50,000

5 September Hybrid friendly	Indonesia	1–1	Hertha 03–Wacker 04 XI	Jakarta, Indonesia
--:-- UTC+7	Risdianto 42'		Stolzenburg 3'	Stadium: Gelora Senayan Main Stadium

24 December Hybrid friendly	Indonesia	4–2	FC St. Pauli	Jakarta, Indonesia
--:-- UTC+7	Tumsila 25' 72'; Idris 43'; Asmara 69'		Werner Nickel 84'; Alfred Hußner 86'	Stadium: Gelora Senayan Main Stadium; Attendance: 50.000

==== 1973 ====
28 January Hybrid friendly	Indonesia	1–2	Unión Española	Surabaya, Indonesia
--:-- UTC+7	Sihasale 32'		Vallejos 14' 57'	Stadium: Tambaksari Stadium

30 January Hybrid friendly	Indonesia	1–3	Unión Española	Jakarta, Indonesia
--:-- UTC+7	Kadir 76'		Yávar 16' 25' Toro 30'	Stadium: Gelora Senayan Main Stadium; Attendance: 70,000

15 February Hybrid friendly	Indonesia	1–4	Benfica	Jakarta, Indonesia
--:-- UTC+7	Waskito 83'	Report	Eusébio 5' 54' 71'; Artur Jorge 17'	Stadium: Gelora Senayan Main Stadium; Attendance: 80,000

28 February Hybrid friendly	Indonesia	4–2	Nippon Kokan	Surabaya, Indonesia
--:-- UTC+7	Kadir 40' Idris 65' 70' Sihasale 77'		Shinzo Hosoka 25' Junji Narasawa 33'	Stadium: Tambaksari Stadium; Attendance: 20,000

==== 1974 ====
7 January Hybrid friendly	Indonesia	1–2	Rapid Wien	Jakarta, Indonesia
--:-- UTC+7				Stadium: Gelora Senayan Main Stadium; Attendance: 25,000

18 July Hybrid friendly	Indonesia	2–0	Nykøbing	Jakarta, Indonesia
--:-- UTC+7	Waskito 25' 43'			Stadium: Gelora Senayan Main Stadium; Attendance: 10,000

==== 1975 ====
6 February Hybrid friendly	Indonesia	2–4	Independiente	Jakarta, Indonesia
--:-- UTC+7				Stadium: Gelora Senayan Main Stadium

1 June PSSI Triangular Tournament	Indonesia	0–0	Manchester United	Jakarta, Indonesia
--:-- UTC+7		Report		Stadium: Gelora Senayan Main Stadium; Attendance: 70,000

5 June PSSI Triangular Tournament	Indonesia	1–4	Ajax	Jakarta, Indonesia
--:-- UTC+7	Waskito 87'	Report	Rep 22'; Suurbier 73'; Brokamp 76', 78'	Stadium: Gelora Senayan Main Stadium

22 August Piala Tri Dasawarsa	Indonesia	2–2	Dnepr	Jakarta, Indonesia
--:-- UTC+7	Lala 31'; Asmara 59'	Report	Yevseyenko 5'; Solovyev 77'	Stadium: Gelora Senayan Main Stadium

24 August Piala Tri Dasawarsa	Indonesia	0–2	Rosario Central	Jakarta, Indonesia
--:-- UTC+7		Report	Caceres 35'; Aimar 54'	Stadium: Gelora Senayan Main Stadium

27 August Piala Tri Dasawarsa	Indonesia	0–0	Benfica	Jakarta, Indonesia
--:-- UTC+7		Report		Stadium: Gelora Senayan Main Stadium

==== 1976 ====
26 June Hybrid friendly	Indonesia	1–1	Stoke City	Jakarta, Indonesia
--:-- UTC+7	Tumsila			Stadium: Gelora Senayan Main Stadium

6 October Hybrid friendly	Indonesia	1–1	São Paulo	Jakarta, Indonesia
--:-- UTC+7	Hadi Ismanto		Carrasco	Stadium: Gelora Senayan Main Stadium

12 November Hybrid friendly	Indonesia	4–1	Kristiansund BK	Jakarta, Indonesia
--:-- UTC+7	Waskito 4'; Risdianto 76'; Asmara 78'; Pattinasarany 80'	Report	Svensen 40'	Stadium: Gelora Senayan Main Stadium; Attendance: 35,000

19 November Hybrid friendly	Indonesia	2–0	Esbjerg	Jakarta, Indonesia
--:-- UTC+7		Report		Stadium: Gelora Senayan Main Stadium; Attendance: 45,500

==== 1977 ====
17 January Hybrid Friendly	Indonesia	3-2	(Switzerland) Neuchâtel Xamax	Djakarta, Indonesia
--:-- UTC+7		Report		Stadium: Gelora Senayan Main Stadium

21 January Hybrid Friendly	Indonesia	1-2	(Bulgaria) Levski Spartak	Djakarta, Indonesia
--:-- UTC+7		Report		Stadium: Gelora Senayan Main Stadium

3 February Hybrid friendly	Indonesia	3–2	Atlético Mineiro	Jakarta, Indonesia
--:-- UTC+7	Pattinasarany 48'; Andi Lala 59'; Idris 74'	Report	Marcelo 69' 88'	Stadium: Gelora Senayan Main Stadium

7 February Hybrid friendly	Indonesia	0–1	Legia Warsaw	Jakarta, Indonesia
--:-- UTC+7		Report	Nowak 8'	Stadium: Gelora Senayan Main Stadium

9 February Hybrid friendly	Indonesia	1–0	Yugoslavia U-23	Jakarta, Indonesia
--:-- UTC+7	Risdianto 25'			Stadium: Gelora Senayan Main Stadium

12 November Hybrid friendly	Indonesia	1–0	Spartak Moscow	Jakarta, Indonesia
--:-- UTC+7	Idris	Report		Stadium: Gelora Senayan Main Stadium; Attendance: 60.000; Referee: Sutoyo

==== 1978 ====
19 June 1978 Jakarta Anniversary Tournament	Indonesia	7–0	Indonesia B	Jakarta, Indonesia
--:-- UTC+7		Report		Stadium: Gelora Senayan Main Stadium

==== 1979 ====
27 May 1979 Kirin Cup	Indonesia	0–6	Tottenham Hotspur	Tokyo, Japan
--:-- UTC+7		Report		Stadium: Nishigaoka Soccer Stadium

29 May 1979 Kirin Cup	Indonesia	0–4	Fiorentina	Tokyo, Japan
--:-- UTC+7		Report		Stadium: Nishigaoka Soccer Stadium

17 June Hybrid Friendly	Indonesia	1–0	(Spain) RCD Espanyol	Jakarta, Indonesia
--:-- UTC+7	Hadi Ismanto 66'			Stadium: Gelora Senayan Main Stadium

=== 1980s ===
==== 1980 ====
23 August 1980 President's Cup	Indonesia	2–1	Thailand B	Seoul, South Korea
17:15 UTC+9				Stadium: Dongdaemun Stadium

27 August 1980 President's Cup	Indonesia	3–2	Bahrain B	Daejon, South Korea
13:00 UTC+9				Stadium: Daejeon Hanbat Sports Complex

29 August 1980 President's Cup	South Korea B	1–1	Indonesia	Gwangju, South Korea
14:45 UTC+9	Byun Il-woo 18'	Report	Pattinasarany 7'	Stadium: Gwangju Mudeung Stadium

31 August 1980 President's Cup	Malaysia B	1–1	Indonesia	Busan, South Korea
16:45 UTC+9				Stadium: Busan Gudeok Stadium

==== 1981 ====
19 February Hybrid friendly	Indonesia	0–0	Ajax	Jakarta, Indonesia
--:-- UTC+7				Stadium: Gelora Senayan Main Stadium; Attendance: 70,000

12 November Hybrid friendly	Indonesia	5–0	Buana Putra	Indonesia
--:-- UTC+7

==== 1983 ====
19 January Hybrid friendly	Indonesia	1–1	Hallelujah FC	Jakarta, Indonesia
--:-- UTC+7	Hadi Ismanto		Park Sang-in	Stadium: Gelora Senayan Main Stadium

4 June 1983 President's Cup	United States Olympic	2–2	Indonesia	Seoul, South Korea
17:15 UTC+9	Fox 24'; Abdullah 47' (o.g.)	Report	Narno 40', 88'	Stadium: Dongdaemun Stadium

6 June 1983 President's Cup	Indonesia	0–3	Genoa	Suwon, South Korea
15:30 UTC+9		Report	Narno 40', 88'	Stadium: Suwon Sports Complex

7 December 1983 Merlion Cup	Indonesia	0–0	South Korea B	Singapore
--:-- UTC+8

==== 1984 ====
29 August 1984 Merdeka Tournament	Indonesia	0–2	Minas Gerais XI	Kuala Lumpur, Malaysia
--:-- UTC+8		Report		Stadium: Stadium Merdeka

==== 1986 ====
12 August 1986 Independence Cup	Indonesia	2–1	Malaysian Tigers	Jakarta, Indonesia
	Lubis 60'; Sunardi 69'	Report	Johar 56' (pen.)	Stadium: Senayan Stadium

14 August 1986 Independence Cup	Rio de Janeiro XI	4–1	Indonesia	Jakarta, Indonesia
	Luisinho Lemos 24' (pen.), 53', 75'; Pedro Paulo 59'	Report	Sutrisno 5'	Stadium: Senayan Stadium

17 August 1986 Independence Cup	Indonesia	3–0 (awarded) (a.e.t.)	Romania U-18	Jakarta, Indonesia
		Report		Stadium: Senayan Stadium
Note: Romania U-18 were leading 2-1 in extra time, but then abandoned the game to protest referee's decisions. The match was awarded as a 3–0 win to Indonesia.

==== 1987 ====
14 June Hybrid friendly	Indonesia	3–3	PSV	Jakarta, Indonesia
--:-- UTC+7	Yacobi (?), 82'; Hartono	Report		Stadium: Gelora Senayan Main Stadium

2 August 1987 Independence Cup	Indonesia	2–0	(Thailand) Port Authority	Jakarta, Indonesia
	Nere 52', 86'	Report		Stadium: Senayan Stadium

7 August 1987 Independence Cup	Indonesia	2–1	Indonesia B	Jakarta, Indonesia
	Yacobi 67' (pen.); Nere 86'	Report	Hattu 52' (pen.)	Stadium: Senayan Stadium

==== 1988 ====
7 August 1988 Independence Cup	China B	1–1	Indonesia	Jakarta, Indonesia
	Xu Hui 45'	Report	Rangkuti 20' (pen.)	Stadium: Senayan Stadium

11 August 1988 Independence Cup	Indonesia	5–3	Indonesia U-23	Jakarta, Indonesia
	Hartono; Yacobi; Alhadad; Darmadi	Report	Saununu; Darmawan	Stadium: Senayan Stadium

13 August 1988 Independence Cup	Indonesia	0–1	Australia U-20	Jakarta, Indonesia
		Report	Arambasic 86'	Stadium: Senayan Stadium

10 December 1988 Merdeka Tournament	Indonesia	1–1	Soviet Union U-19	Kuala Lumpur, Malaysia
--:-- UTC+8	Yacobi 44'	Report	Tishkov 13'	Stadium: Stadium Merdeka; Referee: N.Subramaniam (Malaysia)

15 December 1988 Merdeka Tournament	Hamburger SV	6–0	Indonesia	Kuala Lumpur, Malaysia
--:-- UTC+8	von Heesen 4'; Jusufi 28'; Bein 57', 59', 88'; Kaltz 60' (pen.)	Report		Stadium: Stadium Merdeka; Attendance: 7,000

=== 1990s ===
==== 1990 ====
21 August 1990 Independence Cup	Indonesia	0–0	Thailand U-23	Jakarta, Indonesia
		Report		Stadium: Senayan Stadium

23 August 1990 Independence Cup	Indonesia	2–0	Malaysia U-23	Jakarta, Indonesia
	Mustaqim 33'; Sandria 80'	Report		Stadium: Senayan Stadium

==== 1991 ====
4 February 1991 Merdeka Tournament	Indonesia	0–2	Admira Wacker	Kuala Lumpur, Malaysia
--:-- UTC+8		Report	Gretschnig 71'; Dötzl 90'	Stadium: Stadium Merdeka

8 February 1991 Merdeka Tournament	Indonesia	1–3	China Olympic	Kuala Lumpur, Malaysia
--:-- UTC+8	Yacobi 12'	Report	Zhai Biao 41'; Zhang Jun 48'; Hu Zhijun 63'	Stadium: Stadium Merdeka

==== 1992 ====
10 August 1992 Independence Cup	Indonesia	0–1	South Korea U-19	Jakarta, Indonesia
		Report		Stadium: Senayan Stadium

11 August 1992 Independence Cup	Thailand Olympic	1–4	Indonesia	Jakarta, Indonesia
	Boosol 63'	Report	Putiray 20'; Husaini 78'; Ekodono 83'; Ismu 84'	Stadium: Senayan Stadium

==== 1995 ====
8 November Hybrid friendly	China Olympic	3–2	Indonesia	Beijing, China
		Report

==== 1996 ====
4 June Hybrid friendly	Indonesia	2–1	Sampdoria	Jakarta, Indonesia
--:-- UTC+7				Stadium: Senayan Stadium

11 June Hybrid friendly	Western Australia	2–2	Indonesia	Perth, Australia
--:-- UTC+10

==== 1999 ====
10 July Hybrid friendly	Levadia Tallinn	2–0	Indonesia	Tallinn, Estonia
--:--

12 July Hybrid friendly	Viljandi Tulevik	3–0	Indonesia	Viljandi, Estonia
--:--

=== 2000s ===
==== 2000 ====
3 August Hybrid friendly	Indonesia	1–1	Instant-Dict	Jakarta, Indonesia
--:-- UTC+7

28 September Hybrid friendly	Vitesse Arnhem	4–2	Indonesia	Arnhem, Netherlands
--:--

5 October Hybrid friendly	Dordrecht'90	4–1	Indonesia	Dordrecht, Netherlands
--:--

7 October Hybrid friendly	NAC Breda	7–1	Indonesia	Breda, Netherlands
--:--

==== 2007 ====
19 December Hybrid friendly	Indonesia	0–1	Borussia Dortmund	Jakarta, Indonesia
--:-- UTC+7		Report	Petrić 43' (pen.)	Stadium: Gelora Bung Karno Stadium

==== 2008 ====
22 May Hybrid friendly	Indonesia	1–5	Bayern Munich	Jakarta, Indonesia
--:-- UTC+7	Bambang 66'	Report	Breno 21'; Schlaudraff 24', 35', 82'; Kroos 86'	Stadium: Gelora Bung Karno Stadium; Attendance: 70,000

24 July Hybrid friendly	Indonesia	2–1	New Zealand U-23	Bandung, Indonesia
--:-- UTC+7	Budi 28'; Bambang 73'			Stadium: Siliwangi Stadium

27 August 2008 Indonesia Independence Cup	Indonesia	1–0	Indonesia U-21	Jakarta, Indonesia
--:-- UTC+7	Ponaryo 20'			Stadium: Gelora Bung Karno Stadium

29 August 2008 Indonesia Independence Cup Final	Libya U-23	1–3 (awarded)	Indonesia	Jakarta, Indonesia
--:-- UTC+7	Mohamed 13'			Stadium: Gelora Bung Karno Stadium; Attendance: 50,000
Note: The match was cancelled at half time as Libya withdrew due to an altercation between two coaches of each team. As the result, Indonesia was instantly awarded 3 goals.

8 November Hybrid friendly	Indonesia	4–1	Pelita Jaya	Jakarta, Indonesia
--:-- UTC+7	Budi; Musafri; Aliyudin; Suyono			Stadium: Gelora Bung Karno Stadium

19 November 2008 Myanmar Grand Royal Challenge Cup	Ulsan Hyundai Reserves	0–0 (a.e.t.) (3–4 p)	Indonesia	Yangon, Myanmar
--:--				Stadium: Thuwunna YTC Stadium; Attendance: 30,000
	Penalties
	Park Dong-Hyuk (penalty scored); Lee Jin-Ho (penalty missed); Kim Dong-Kyu (penalty scored); Seo Byung-Hwan (penalty scored); Park Byung-Gyu (penalty missed); Kwon Hyuk-Jin (penalty missed)		(penalty missed) Bambang; (penalty scored) Isnan; (penalty missed) Elie; (penalty scored) Erol; (penalty scored) Charis; (penalty scored) Firman

==== 2009 ====
15 January Hybrid friendly	Al-Shabab	2–3	Indonesia	Muscat, Oman
--:--			Budi 14'; Bambang 35', 55'	Stadium: Sultan Qaboos Sports Complex

30 October Hybrid friendly	Indonesia	4–1	Indonesian Armed Forces	Jakarta, Indonesia
--:-- UTC+7				Stadium: Gelora Bung Karno Stadium

10 November Hybrid friendly	Al-Salmiya	0–0	Indonesia	Salmiya, Kuwait
--:--				Stadium: Thamir Stadium

=== 2010s ===
==== 2010 ====
2 September Hybrid friendly	Indonesia	4–1	(Indonesia) Persita	Jakarta, Indonesia
--:-- UTC+7	Ridwan 65' 68'; Arif S. 83' 89'	Report	Batalla 73' (pen.)	Stadium: Gelora Bung Karno Stadium; Referee: Jimmy Napitupulu (Indonesia)

5 September Hybrid friendly	Indonesia	3–0	(Indonesia) Pro Titan	Jakarta, Indonesia
--:-- UTC+7	Arif S. 25'; Bambang 32'; Isnaini 75'			Stadium: Gelora Bung Karno Stadium

==== 2011 ====
18 August Hybrid friendly	Indonesia	1–1	Indonesia U-23	Surakarta, Indonesia
20:30 UTC+7	Bambang 60' (pen.)	Report	Septia 26'	Stadium: Manahan Stadium; Attendance: 23,000; Referee: Oki Dwi Putra (Indonesia)

19 December Hybrid friendly	Indonesia	0–1	Los Angeles Galaxy	Jakarta, Indonesia
19:00 UTC+7		Report	Keane 14'	Stadium: Gelora Bung Karno Stadium; Attendance: 20,000; Referee: Faulur Rosy (Indonesia)

==== 2012 ====
24 February Hybrid friendly	Persebaya (Indonesia)	1–0	Indonesia	Surabaya, Indonesia
19:30 UTC+7	Dutra 63' (pen.)			Stadium: Gelora Bung Tomo Stadium; Referee: Retu Slamet (Indonesia)

18 March Hybrid friendly	Persepar (Indonesia)	2–2	Indonesia	Palangkaraya, Indonesia
--:-- UTC+7	Kwateh 25'; Faisal 63'		Arif 42'; Bachdim 45'	Stadium: Tuah Pahoe Stadium

30 March Hybrid friendly	Persijap (Indonesia)	3–0	Indonesia	Jepara, Indonesia
19:30 UTC+7	Bassoken 33'; Hadi 36'; Andra 85'	Report	Gelora Bumi Kartini Stadium

3 May Hybrid friendly	PPSM (Indonesia)	0–8	Indonesia	Magelang, Indonesia
--:-- UTC+7		Report	Ramdhan 12'; Hidayat 17', 37'; Bachdim 48', 71'; Pahabol 57', 74'; Nurcahyo 87'	Stadium: Madya Stadium

11 May Hybrid friendly	Persiba Bantul (Indonesia)	1–1	Indonesia	Bantul, Indonesia
--:-- UTC+7	Busari 67'		Iskandar 34'	Stadium: Sultan Agung Stadium

19 May 2012 Al Nakba Cup	Kurdistan Region	1–1	Indonesia	Hebron, Palestine
18:00 UTC+2	Abdullah 16'		Bonai 17'	Stadium: Dora International Stadium

26 May Hybrid friendly	Indonesia	2–4	Inter Milan	Jakarta, Indonesia
19:30 UTC+7	Wanggai 12'; Pahabol 90+3'	Report	Coutinho 6', 43'; Pazzini 61', 74'	Stadium: Gelora Bung Karno Stadium; Attendance: 50,000; Referee: Nagor Amir Noor Mohamed (Malaysia)

4 August Hybrid friendly	Indonesia	0–5	(Spain) Valencia	Jakarta, Indonesia
21:30 UTC+7		Report	Piatti 4'; Alcácer 12', 56'; R. Costa 25'; Hernández 52'	Stadium: Gelora Bung Karno Main Stadium; Referee: Faulur Rosy (Indonesia)

9 December Hybrid friendly	Sanggata (Indonesia)	2–3	Indonesia	Sangatta, Indonesia
--:-- UTC+7		Report		Stadium: Sanggata Stadium

==== 2013 ====
19 January Hybrid friendly	Pro Duta (Indonesia)	0–0	Indonesia	Medan, Indonesia
08:00		Report		Stadium: USU Mini Stadium

24 January Hybrid friendly	Semen Padang (Indonesia)	3–2	Indonesia	Lubuk Pakam, Indonesia
16:00	Bonai 7'; Wilson 41' 78'		Mofu 47'; Aibekob 90'	Stadium: Baharuddin Siregar Stadium

14 July Hybrid friendly	Indonesia	0–7	Arsenal	Jakarta, Indonesia
20:45 UTC+7		Report	Walcott 19'; Akpom 54'; Giroud 70', 73'; Podolski 83'; Olsson 85'; Eisfeld 86'	Stadium: Gelora Bung Karno Stadium; Attendance: 40,489; Referee: Shuhaizi Bin Shukri (Malaysia)

20 July Hybrid friendly	Indonesia	0–2	(England) Liverpool	Jakarta, Indonesia
18:30 UTC+7		Report	Coutinho 19'; Sterling 87'	Stadium: Gelora Bung Karno Stadium; Attendance: 85,000; Referee: Mohd Nafeez Abdul Wahab (Malaysia)

25 July Hybrid friendly	Indonesia	1–8	(England) Chelsea	Jakarta, Indonesia
18:30 UTC+7	Kalas 69' (o.g.)	Report	Hazard 22' (pen.); Ramires 30', 57'; Ba 32'; Terry 45'; Traoré 52'; Lukaku 53', 66'	Stadium: Gelora Bung Karno Stadium; Attendance: 88,000

10 November Hybrid friendly	April 25 (North Korea)	2–0	Indonesia	Pyongyang, North Korea

==== 2014 ====
2 April Hybrid friendly	Villarreal B (Spain)	0–1	Indonesia	Alzira, Spain
15:00			Zulham 3'	Stadium: Estadio Luis Suñer Picó; Attendance: 0

11 May Hybrid friendly	Indonesia	1–0	ASEAN All-Stars	Jakarta, Indonesia
21:00	Musafri 14'	Report		Stadium: Gelora Bung Karno Stadium; Referee: Ahmed Afsah (Maldives)

21 June Hybrid friendly	Indonesia	4–0	Pakistan U-23	Sidoarjo, Indonesia
16:40 UTC+7	Gonzáles 4'; Jufriyanto 45+5'; Zamrun 61'; Hartono 87'	Report		Stadium: Gelora Delta Stadium; Attendance: 1,500; Referee: Prasetyo Hadi (Indonesia)

==== 2017 ====
18 November Hybrid friendly	Indonesia	0–1	Syria U-23	Cikarang, Indonesia
18:00 UTC+7		Report	Anez 83'	Stadium: Wibawa Mukti Stadium; Referee: Ngô Duy Lân (Vietnam)

==== 2019 ====
12 March Hybrid friendly	Perth Glory (Australia)	1–3	Indonesia	Perth, Australia
17:45 UTC+9	Henry 41'	Report	Rahmat 67', 81', 88'	Stadium: Perth Stadium

16 March Hybrid friendly	State League 2 All-Stars (Australia)	1–5	Indonesia	Perth, Australia
17:45 UTC+9	?? 67' (pen.)	Report	Dutra 12'; Rahmat 15'; Febri 52'; Evan Dimas 78'; Sanadi 80'	Stadium: Perth Stadium

20 March Hybrid friendly	Bali United (Indonesia)	1–1	Indonesia	Bali, Indonesia
15:30	Gunawan 16'	Report	Lestusen 78' (pen.)	Stadium: Kapten I Wayan Dipta Stadium; Attendance: 0

25 August Hybrid friendly	Indonesia	4–0	(Indonesia) Persika	Cibinong, Indonesia
18:00	Beto 16'; Irfan 45'; Pellu 56'; Otavio 81'			Stadium: Pakansari Stadium; Attendance: 0

28 August Hybrid friendly	Indonesia	2–0	(Indonesia) Bhayangkara	Cibinong, Indonesia
	Beto 37' (pen.); Hanif 63'			Stadium: Pakansari Stadium; Attendance: 0

=== 2020s ===
==== 2020 ====
21 February Hybrid friendly	Indonesia	1–4	(Indonesia) Persita	Jakarta, Indonesia
	Pora	Report	Irianto (o.g.); Arif; Hasanović; Al Achya	Stadium: Gelora Bung Karno Stadium; Attendance: 0

==== 2021 ====
28 November Hybrid friendly	Antalyaspor (Turkey)	0–4	Indonesia	Antalya, Turkey
16:00 UTC+3		Report	Kambuaya 54'; Witan 58'; Ezra 81'; Evan 90'	Stadium: Limak Football Complex; Attendance: 0
