= 2011–12 Persija Jakarta season =

Persija Jakarta
2011-12 season
- Chairman: Ferry Paulus
- Manager: Iwan Setiawan
- Ground: Gelora Bung Karno
- Indonesian Super League: 5th
- Top goalscorer: League: Bambang Pamungkas Pedro Velázquez (16); All: Bambang Pamungkas Pedro Velázquez (16)
- Highest home attendance: 50,000 (27 May 2012 vs Persib Bandung, Super League)
- Lowest home attendance: 0 (19 June 2012 vs PSPS Pekanbaru, Super League)

The 2011–12 season is Persija's 81st competitive season, Persija was played in the Indonesian Super League and finished fifth at the end of the season. Bambang Pamungkas and Pedro Velázquez are the top scorer for Persija with 16 goals.

== First-team squad ==
As of 27 April 2012.

Note: Flags indicate national team as defined under FIFA eligibility rules; some limited exceptions apply. Players may hold more than one non-FIFA nationality.

No.	Pos.	Nation	Player
1	GK	IDN	Galih Sudaryono
2	DF	SGP	Precious Emuejeraye
4	MF	IDN	Fahreza Agamal
6	MF	IDN	Abdul Tommy
7	MF	IDN	Rizki Ramdani Lestaluhu
8	MF	KOR	Jeong Kwang-Sik
9	MF	IDN	Rudi Setiawan
10	MF	ARG	Robertino Pugliara
11	FW	IDN	Alan Martha
13	DF	IDN	Hasyim Kipuw
14	DF	IDN	Ismed Sofyan (vice-captain)
15	DF	BRA	Fabiano Beltrame
17	MF	IDN	Delton Stefano
18	MF	IDN	Oktavianus

No.	Pos.	Nation	Player
19	MF	IDN	Johan Juansyah
20	FW	IDN	Bambang Pamungkas (Captain)
21	MF	IDN	Amarzukih
22	GK	IDN	Bagus Jiwo
23	DF	IDN	Leo Saputra
25	FW	PAR	Pedro Velázquez
26	GK	IDN	Andritany Ardhiyasa
27	FW	IDN	Rahmat Affandi
28	DF	IDN	AA Ngurah Wahyu
29	GK	IDN	Adixi Lenzivio
35	DF	IDN	Saronih
42	FW	IDN	Achmad Ikhwan
90	MF	IDN	Arief Dwi

=== On loan ===
Note: Flags indicate national team as defined under FIFA eligibility rules; some limited exceptions apply. Players may hold more than one non-FIFA nationality.

No.	Pos.	Nation	Player
3	DF	IDN	Soleman Lubis (at Persiba Balikpapan)

== Transfers ==
=== In ===
Player	Moving from
(Argentina) Robertino Pugliara	(Indonesia) Persiba Balikpapan
(Brazil) Fabiano Da Rosa Beltrame	(Indonesia) Persela Lamongan
(Indonesia) Rahmat Affandi	(Indonesia) Persib Bandung
(Indonesia) I Wayan Gangga Mudana	(Indonesia) Persisam Putra Samarinda
(Indonesia) Bagus Jiwo	(Indonesia) Persis Solo
(Indonesia) Johan Juansyah	(Indonesia) Persijap Jepara
(Indonesia) Galih Sudaryono	(Indonesia) Persiba Balikpapan
(Paraguay) Pedro Velázquez	(Bolivia) The Strongest
(South Korea) Jeong Kwang-Sik	(Australia) Brisbane City

=== Out ===
Player	Moving to
(Cameroon) Eric Bayemi	(Indonesia) Persidafon Dafonsoro
(Indonesia) Aliyudin Ali	(Indonesia) Persib Bandung
(Indonesia) Ambrizal	(Indonesia) PSPS Pekanbaru
(Indonesia) Syamsul Chaeruddin	(Indonesia) Sriwijaya FC
(Indonesia) Muhammad Ilham	(Indonesia) Persib Bandung
(Indonesia) Hendro Kartiko	(Indonesia) Mitra Kukar
(Indonesia) Mohammad Nasuha	(Indonesia) Persib Bandung
(Indonesia) Greg Nwokolo	(Indonesia) Pelita Jaya
(Indonesia) Roni Tri Prasnanto	(Indonesia) Persela Lamongan
(Indonesia) Tony Sucipto	(Indonesia) Persib Bandung
(Liberia) Oliver Makor	(Indonesia) Persik Kediri
(Singapore) Agu Casmir	(Malaysia) Singapore LIONSXII
(Indonesia) I Wayan Gangga Mudana	(Indonesia) Gresik United

== Club ==
=== Coaching staff ===
Position	Name	Nationality
Manager	Ferry Paulus	Indonesia
Assistant manager	Ir. Ferry Indrasjarief	Indonesia
Head coach	Iwan Setiawan	Indonesia
Assistant coach	Sudirman	Indonesia
Assistant coach 1	Miftahudin	Indonesia
Goalkeeping coach	Galih Haryono	Indonesia
Fitness coach	Agus Sugeng	Indonesia
Medical Doctor Team	Dr. Nanang Tri	Indonesia
Physiotherapist 1	Amudi Saripudin	Indonesia
Physiotherapist 2	M. Mansyur	Indonesia
Physiotherapist 3	Umar Bowi	Indonesia

== Competitions ==
=== Classification ===
Pos	Team	Pld	W	D	L	GF	GA	GD	Pts
3	Persiwa Wamena	34	19	4	11	60	42	+18	61
4	Persela Lamongan	34	15	11	8	58	43	+15	56
5	Persija Jakarta	34	14	10	10	53	36	+17	52
6	Pelita Jaya	34	15	6	13	68	51	+17	51
7	Persiba Balikpapan	34	14	9	11	60	55	+5	51

Updated to match(es) played on 11 July 2012. Source: 2011–12 Super League table
Rules for classification: 1) points; 2) goal difference; 3) number of goals scored.

=== Indonesia Super League ===
Date	Opponents	H / A	Result F – A	Scorers	Attendance	League position
1 December 2011	Deltras Sidoarjo	H	1 - 0	Affandi 61'	15,000	
5 December 2011	Persidafon Dafonsoro	H	0 - 0		16,000	
11 December 2011	Persiram Raja Ampat	A	0 - 6	Robertino 19', Bambang 24', Juansyah 26', Ramdani 57', Ismed 62', Affandi 82'	600	
18 December 2011	Sriwijaya FC	A	2 - 1	Pedro 79'	20,000	
15 January 2012	PSPS Pekanbaru	A	2 - 0	Fabiano 32', Bambang 63'	15,763	
23 January 2012	Pelita Jaya FC	A	0 - 2	Fabiano 4', Pedro 56'	7,326	
29 January 2012	Persib Bandung	A	1 - 0		30,000	
3 February 2012	Persiwa Wamena	H	1 - 2	Bambang 74'	12,503	
7 February 2012	Persipura Jayapura	H	1 - 0	Bambang 44'	14,503	
15 February 2012	Persela Lamongan	A	2 - 2	Robertino 8', Pedro 39'	7,600	
19 February 2012	Arema Indonesia	A	1 - 1	Bambang 30'	16,648	
26 February 2012	Persisam Samarinda	H	0 - 0		23,450	
1 March 2012	Mitra Kukar	H	1 - 1	Bambang 34'	14,520	
4 March 2012	Persiba Balikpapan	H	4 - 0	Pedro 28' 38', Bambang 57', Ramdani 82'	20,599	
13 March 2012	Gresik United	H	2 - 0	Pedro 89', Bambang 90'	17,650	
25 March 2012	PSAP Sigli	A	1 - 0		5,475	
30 March 2012	PSMS Medan	A	3 - 3	Bambang 44' 50' 71'	12,456	
14 April 2012	PSMS Medan	H	1 - 0	Bambang 47'	24,645	
18 April 2012	PSAP Sigli	H	5 - 1	Pedro 1' 39', Bambang 46' 64', Oktavianus 79'	6,420	
22 April 2012	Gresik United	A	2 - 0		20,245	
27 April 2012	Persiba Balikpapan	A	2 - 2	Pedro 16', Robertino 52'	6,419	
2 May 2012	Persela Lamongan	H	1 - 1	Fabiano 76'	5,000	
6 May 2012	Arema Indonesia	H	1 - 0	Pedro 59'	12,155	
13 May 2012	Persipura Jayapura	A	0 - 1	Affandi 35'	15,260	
16 May 2012	Persiwa Wamena	A	4 - 1	Pedro 7'	9,533	
22 May 2012	Pelita Jaya FC	H	2 - 1	Fabiano 3', Pedro 56'	615	
27 May 2012	Persib Bandung	H	2 - 2	Ramdani 64', Precious 72'	50,000	
10 June 2012	Persisam Samarinda	A	1 - 1	Ramdani 55'	13,643	
16 June 2012	Mitra Kukar	A	3 - 0		3,178	
19 June 2012	PSPS Pekanbaru	H	4 - 0	Pedro 23' 35' 84', Bambang 70'	0	
24 June 2012	Sriwijaya FC	H	3 - 0	Pedro 14', Affandi 17' 63'	14,375	
30 June 2012	Persiram Raja Ampat	H	1 - 2	Bambang 68'	0	
6 July 2012	Deltras Sidoarjo	A	1 - 0		7,230	
11 July 2012	Persidafon Dafonsoro	A	3 - 1	Affandi 86'	5,830	

== See also ==
- 2011–12 Indonesia Super League
