= 2010–11 Persija Jakarta season =

Persija Jakarta
2010–11 season
- Chairman: Tony Tobias
- Manager: Rahmad Darmawan
- Indonesian Super League: 3rd
- Top goalscorer: League: Greg Nwokolo (13); All: Greg Nwokolo (13)
- Highest home attendance: 38,512 (30 October vs Persib Bandung, Super League)
- Lowest home attendance: 5,000 (16 October vs Persela Lamongan at Jatidiri Stadium, Super League)
Home colours	Away colours	Third colours

In the 2010–11 season, Persija Jakarta played in the Indonesian Super League and Piala Indonesia.

== Season overview ==
In this season, Persija successfully end the competition in third place Indonesian Super League. Teams are coached by Rahmad Darmawan is only on goal difference from the second place, Arema Indonesia. Persija also beat back-to-back Persib Bandung.

== Club ==
=== Coaching staff ===
Position	Name	Nationality
Manager	Harianto Badjoeri	Indonesia
Assistant manager	Ir. Ferry Indrasjarief	Indonesia
Head coach	Rahmad Darmawan	Indonesia
Assistant coach	Francis Wewengkang	Indonesia
Goalkeeping coach	Galih Haryono	Indonesia
Fitness coach	Agus Sugeng	Indonesia
Medical Doctor Team	Dr. Monas	Indonesia
Physiotherapist 1	Amudi Saripudin	Indonesia
Physiotherapist 2	M. Mansyur	Indonesia

== Squad ==
Note: Flags indicate national team as defined under FIFA eligibility rules; some limited exceptions apply. Players may hold more than one non-FIFA nationality.

No.	Pos.	Nation	Player
1	GK	IDN	Roni Tri Prasnanto
2	DF	SGP	Precious Emuejeraye
4	DF	CMR	Eric Bayemi
6	MF	IDN	Tony Sucipto
7	MF	IDN	Rizky Ramdani Lestaluhu
8	MF	IDN	Syamsul Chaeruddin
10	MF	NGA	Greg Nwokolo
11	MF	IDN	Agus Indra Kurniawan
13	DF	IDN	Hasyim Kipuw
14	DF	IDN	Ismed Sofyan (vice-captain)
15	FW	IDN	Aliyudin
17	DF	IDN	Mohammad Nasuha
18	MF	IDN	Oktavianus

No.	Pos.	Nation	Player
19	MF	IDN	Ambrizal
20	FW	IDN	Bambang Pamungkas (captain)
21	MF	IDN	Ahmad Marzukih
22	MF	LBR	Oliver Makor
23	DF	IDN	Leo Saputra
26	GK	IDN	Andritany Ardhiyasa
28	DF	IDN	AA Ngurah Wahyu
29	FW	SGP	Agu Cashmir
34	GK	IDN	Hendro Kartiko
44	DF	IDN	Wirya Kumandra
81	MF	IDN	Muhammad Ilham
89	FW	IDN	Sansan Fauzi Husaeni
91	MF	IDN	Lifky Suteja

- Persija Jakarta's Starting 11 in their 4-4-2 Formation

=== Out on loan ===
Note: Flags indicate national team as defined under FIFA eligibility rules; some limited exceptions apply. Players may hold more than one non-FIFA nationality.

No.	Pos.	Nation	Player
9	FW	HKG	Julius Akosah (at Bontang FC)

== Transfers ==
=== In ===
Player	Moving from
(Indonesia) Mohammad Nasuha	(Indonesia) Sriwijaya FC
(Indonesia) Tony Sucipto	(Indonesia) Sriwijaya FC
(Indonesia) Ambrizal	(Indonesia) Sriwijaya FC
(Hong Kong) Julius Pongla Akosah	(Hong Kong) Sun Hei
(Indonesia) Greg Nwokolo	(Portugal) S.C. Olhanense
(Indonesia) Andritany Ardhiyasa	(Indonesia) Sriwijaya FC
(Singapore) Precious Emuejeraye	(Indonesia) Sriwijaya FC
(Indonesia) Hendro Kartiko	(Indonesia) Sriwijaya FC
(Cameroon) Eric Bayemi	(Belarus) FC Dnepr Mogilev
(Indonesia) Oktavianus	(Indonesia) Sriwijaya FC
(Liberia) Oliver Makor	(Greece) Ionikos FC

=== Out ===
Player	Moving to
(Indonesia) Firman Utina	(Indonesia) Sriwijaya FC
(Indonesia) I Wayan Gangga Mudana	(Indonesia) Persisam Putra Samarinda
(Singapore) Baihakki Khaizan	(Indonesia) Persib Bandung
(Singapore) Mustafic Fahrudin	(Indonesia) Persela Lamongan
(Cameroon) Emalue Serge	(Indonesia) Persela Lamongan
(Cameroon) Abanda Herman	(Indonesia) Persema Malang
(Senegal) Papa Toure	Free Agents
(Hong Kong) Julius Akosah	Free Agents

== Competitions ==
=== Classification ===
Pos	Team	Pld	W	D	L	GF	GA	GD	Pts	Qualification
1	Persipura Jayapura (C)	28	17	9	2	63	23	+40	60	Qualification for AFC Champions League qualifying play-off
2	Arema Indonesia	28	15	7	6	52	25	+27	52	Qualification for AFC Cup group stage (Note: Arema qualified for the AFC Cup as league runners-up since Piala Indonesia was not held in 2011.)
3	Persija Jakarta	28	15	7	6	52	28	+24	52	
4	Semen Padang	28	12	12	4	41	27	+14	48	
5	Sriwijaya	28	13	7	8	43	32	+11	46	

Source: Indonesia Super League Table
Rules for classification: 1) points; 2) goal difference; 3) number of goals scored.
(C) Champions

== Matches ==
=== Indonesia Super League ===
Date	Opponents	H / A	Result F – A	Scorers	Attendance	League position
26 September 2010	PSPS Pekanbaru	A	2 - 2	Sofyan 10', Pamungkas 20'	3,320	2nd
16 October 2010	Persela Lamongan	H	2 - 0	Pamungkas 10', 80'	5,000	4th
19 October 2010	Deltras Sidoarjo	H	2 - 0	Aliyudin 38', Lestaluhu 82'	5,000	3rd
23 October 2010	Pelita Jaya	A	1 - 0	Pamungkas 55'	10,456	2nd
26 October 2010	Semen Padang	A	0 - 1		8,000	4th
30 October 2010	Persib Bandung	H	3 - 0	Nwokolo 51', Aliyudin 65', Pamungkas 77'	38,512	2nd
3 November 2010	Sriwijaya FC	H	0 - 0		25,850	4th
9 January 2011	Arema Indonesia	H	2 - 1	Nwokolo 45', Casmir 68'	32,120	2nd
17 January 2011	Persiwa Wamena	A	0 - 2		14,415	3rd
20 January 2011	Persipura Jayapura	A	1 - 2	Nwokolo 62'	19,863	4th
29 January 2011	Persijap Jepara	H	3 - 0	Makor 24', Nasuha 62', Casmir 85'	14,415	4th
2 February 2011	Persiba Balikpapan	A	1 - 0	Bayemi 68'	4,350	3rd
10 February 2011	Bontang FC	A	3 - 1	Makor 12', 74', Ilham 48'	8,200	4th
13 February 2011	Persisam Putra Samarinda	A	0 - 1		14,537	4th
13 Maret 2011	Persiba Balikpapan	H	5 - 1	Pamungkas 9', Ilham 55', 72', Casmir 61', Sucipto 90'	23,067	3rd
13 February 2011	Persib Bandung	A	3 - 2	Pamungkas 15', 68', Makor 40'	25,153	3rd
22 March 2011	Persijap Jepara	A	1 - 4	Casmir 24'	7,416	3rd
31 March 2011	Persipura Jayapura	H	1 - 1	Casmir 86'	13,355	3rd
6 April 2011	Persiwa Wamena	H	0 - 0		15,150	3rd
10 April 2011	Arema Indonesia	A	1 - 2	Pamungkas 86'	32,597	4th
23 April 2011	Persisam Putra Samarinda	H	7 - 2	Makor 3', Pamungkas 6', Nwokolo 32', 49', 64', Ilham 71', Sucipto 80'	9,504	3rd
27 April 2011	Bontang FC	H	4 - 1	Casmir 22', Pamungkas 71', Ilham 74', Nwokolo 79'	9,532	3rd
29 May 2011	Sriwijaya FC	A	3 - 3	Pamungkas 11', Casmir 38', Nwokolo 84'	15,101	4th
2 June 2011	Semen Padang	H	1 - 1	Nwokolo 32'	9.823	4th
5 June 2011	Pelita Jaya	H	1 - 0	Nwokolo 70'	9,734	2nd
9 June 2011	Persela Lamongan	A	0 - 0		11,545	2nd
12 June 2011	Deltras Sidoarjo	A	2 - 1	Nwokolo 3', Casmir 73'		2nd
19 June 2011	PSPS Pekanbaru	H	3 - 0	Nwokolo 8', 89', Casmir 92'	32,100	3rd

== See also ==
- 2010–11 Indonesia Super League
