= Ash'ari (disambiguation) =

Ash'ari is the foremost theological school of Sunni Islam.

Ash'ari or Ashari or Ashaari may also refer to:

- Abu Musa al-Ash'ari was a companion of Muhammad.
- Al-Ash'ari was an Arab Sunni Muslim scholastic theologian.
- Ashari Danoe is an Indonesian footballer.
- Ashari Danudirdjo is an Indonesian sailor.
- Ashari Samsudin is a Malaysian footballer.
- Awal Ashaari is a Malaysian actor.
- Firhan Ashari is a Malaysian field hockey player.
