= Isnan Ali =

Indonesian footballer

Personal information
- Full name: Isnan Ali
- Date of birth: 15 September 1979 (age 47)
- Place of birth: Makassar, Indonesia
- Height: 1.69 m (5 ft 7 in)
- Position: Defender

Youth career
- SSB Bangau Putra
- 1997: PSM Makassar
- 1998–1999: PS Telkom Banjarmasin

Senior career*
| Years | Team | Apps | (Gls) |
| 1999–2002 | Barito Putra | 23 | (2) |
| 2003–2004 | Persikota Tangerang | | |
| 2005–2006 | Persita Tangerang | 24 | (2) |
| 2007–2010 | Sriwijaya | 77 | (0) |
| 2010–2011 | Persib Bandung | 21 | (1) |
| 2011–2012 | Mitra Kukar | 28 | (1) |
| 2012–2013 | Persidafon Dafonsoro | 23 | (2) |
| 2014–2017 | Martapura FC | 9 | (1) |

International career
| 2001 | Indonesia U23 | | (1) |
| 2001–2010 | Indonesia | 32 | (0) |

Managerial career
- 2016–2021: Martapura FC (Assistant)
- 2021–: Barito Putera (Assistant)
- * Club domestic league appearances and goals

Isnan Ali (born 15 September 1979 in Makassar, Sulawesi Selatan, Indonesia) is an Indonesian former professional footballer. He plays as defender.

Isnan Ali is one of the most well-known seniors in the Indonesian National Team due to his appearances from 2002 to present. He is best known for his time with famous clubs such as PSM Makassar (Junior), Barito Putra, and Sriwijaya F.C. Palembang.

When he was younger, he was a talented footballer, as shown through his attendance at local adult competitions in his hometown. He fell in love with football after watching Diego Maradona in the 1986 World Cup, and decided to be a full-time footballer.His family was a source of great support for him, as he said that "Mom and Dad always brought me a soccer ball when they went working." His talent was then tested by enrolling in Sekolah Sepak Bola Bangau Putra on his Upper School years.

Isnan Ali then joined PSM Makassar Junior in 1997, one of the most high-profile football clubs in Indonesia. He represented Makassar 15 years and up at the Hari Pekan Olahraga Nasional (Haornas) Competition.

His football career advances further when he joined Makassar in Pekan Olahraga Daerah (Porda) Makassar in 1997. He scored a decisive goal that brought his team to victory and champion of the tournament. "That is the most memorable grand final event for me. I went from behind and did some sprint and I scored with my head."

Isnan then joined PT Telecom for two years. However, he was faced with a dilemma when Telecom was going to attend a National competition in Surabaya. One of his senior, Fahri Amiruddin, Mitra Kukar asked him to represent Banjarmasin in PRA PON Banjarmasin to boost his football career. Finally he decided to join Banjarmasin at Pekan Olahraga Nasional.

This event opens an opportunity for him to join Barito Putera Banjarmasin in 1999. Young and talented yet he made it to the line up only after joining recently. Particularly on the second round of the National-A League, Liga Indonesia 1999, Daniel Roekito, the coach of Barito at that time appointed Isnan to join the line up. "That was when we play against Solo at Manahan Stadium." After that, he joined the line up every time, although he was still very young. Indeed, the second year with Barito, Isnan was called to join the Senior National team in the World Cup qualifier and Sea Games Malaysia in 2002.

With National team status, Isnan joined Persatuan Sepakbola Seluruh Indonesia (PSSI), to attend training center in Singapore, Malaysia and Maldives. "Maldives is the most sophisticated country due to its popularity with international soccer stars training and holidaying in that country."

With Barito Putra, Isnan qualified in the big 8, 2 years respectively. That was the golden years of Barito, while at the same time, they have Bako Sadissou as the top scorer for the League. Isnan also joined the National Senior team in the Tiger Cup (2002) and achieved the Runner-Up position in that competition.

After 2 sessions with Barito Putra, Isnan joined Persikota Tangerang in 2003/2004. He also joined PSSI National training Camp in Sydney, Australia, Bulgaria and Jordan for Asian Cup 2005.

In 2005/2006 Isnan Ali signed with neighbor club, Persita Tangerang. One interesting event was his action with Renato Ellyas, a teammate in his subsequent club, Sriwijaya FC. "I was in a great stress facing the referee decision that seemed to fix the match and bluntly showed injustices towards my team. However, I have learnt so much from that situation." He did unsportive behavior by giving his middle finger to Renato after given a red card by the referee. In 2006, he was expelled from the National team due to behavior of a controversial nature with some fellow senior national team members like Kurniawan Dwi Yulianto. This did not prevent him to raise up to the occasion.

In 2007, Isnan Ali joined Sriwijaya F.C. with Rahmad Darmawan as the head of coach. In that year, Isnan made history by winning two competitions, an achievement that has yet been reached by any other football clubs in Indonesia.

Isnan Ali also took part in advertisements such as PANONIM and SPECS with Cristian Gonzáles and other famous footballers from Malaysia. SPECS is an international sport company.

This year, Isnan Ali joined Sriwijaya FC. His positive characteristics, for example his professionalism, controversy, personality, achievements and talent have led to his high level of success in Indonesian football. "Much have been seen, but much is still to come". He hopes to act as a source of inspiration for others who wish to represent Indonesia on an international level.

== National Team career ==
- 2001: SEA Games Malaysia (U-23 team)
- 2002: World Cup Qualification(Senior team)
- 2002: Tiger Cup (Senior team)
- 2002: National Training Centre/Camp in Malaysia, Singapore and Maldives (Senior team)
- 2005: National Training Centre/Camp in Australia, Bulgaria and Jordan (Senior team)
- 2005: Asian Cup Qualification (Senior team)

== Honours ==
Sriwijaya

- Liga Indonesia Premier Division: 2007–08
- Copa Indonesia/Piala Indonesia: 2007–08, 2008–09, 2010

Indonesia

- Indonesian Independence Cup: 2008
- AFF Championship runner-up: 2002
