= Ponaryo Astaman =

Indonesian footballer

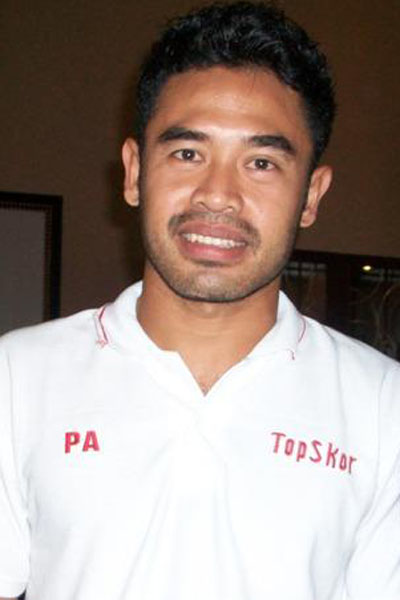
- Astaman in 2011

Personal information
- Full name: Ponaryo Astaman
- Date of birth: 25 September 1979 (age 47)
- Place of birth: Balikpapan, Indonesia
- Height: 1.74 m (5 ft 9 in)
- Position: Midfielder

Youth career
- 1997–1999: Persiba Balikpapan

Senior career*
Years	Team	Apps	(Gls)
2000−2003	PKT Bontang	60	(12)
2003−2006	PSM Makassar	58	(4)
2006−2007	Melaka TMFC	20	(12)
2007−2008	Arema Malang	34	(2)
2008−2009	Persija Jakarta	32	(1)
2009−2013	Sriwijaya	85	(4)
2013−2016	PSM Makassar	36	(12)
2014–2015	→ Persija Jakarta (loan)	5	(1)
2016–2017	Borneo	24	(0)
Total		354	(48)

International career
2001	Indonesia U23		
2003−2013	Indonesia	61	(2)

Managerial career
- 2017–2018: Borneo
Medal record
Men's football
Representing Indonesia
Indonesia Independence Cup
Winner	2008 Indonesia
- * Club domestic league appearances and goals

Ponaryo Astaman (born 25 September 1979) is an Indonesian former professional football player. He was part of Indonesia national football team from 2003 until 2013. He was a captain for Indonesian football team. As a player, he already played for several clubs in Indonesia, such as PSM Makassar, Arema FC, Persija Jakarta, and Sriwijaya. He also played in Malaysia with Melaka TMFC in 2006.

He played for PSM Makassar in the 2004 AFC Champions League group stage, where he scored one goal. He played for Arema Malang in the 2007 AFC Champions League group stage.

== Career statistics ==
=== International Goals ===
Ponaryo Astaman: International goals
No.	Date	Venue	Opponent	Score	Result	Competition
1	3 June 2004	Gelora Bung Karno Stadium, Jakarta, Indonesia	India	1–0	1–1	Friendly
2	18 July 2004	Workers Stadium, Beijing, China	Qatar	2–0	2–1	2004 AFC Asian Cup

=== Other international goals ===
Goal	Date	Venue	Opponent	Score	Result	Competition
1.	30 June 2007	Jakabaring Stadium, Palembang, Indonesia	Liberia XI	2-1	Won	Friendly
2.	27 August 2008	Gelora Bung Karno, Jakarta, Indonesia	Indonesia U-21	1-0	Won	2008 Indonesia Independence Cup

== Honours ==
PKT Bontang

- Liga Indonesia Premier Division runner up: 1999–2000

Melaka TM FC

- Malaysia Super League : 2005-06 runner-up

Sriwijaya

- Indonesia Super League: 2011–12
- Piala Indonesia: 2010
- Indonesian Community Shield: 2010
- Indonesian Inter Island Cup: 2010, 2012

Indonesia

- Indonesian Independence Cup: 2008
- AFF Championship runner-up: 2004
- Pestabola Merdeka runner-up: 2006

Individual

- Liga Indonesia Premier Division Best Player: 2004

Preceded by Agung Setyabudi	Indonesian Captain; 2004–2008	Succeeded by Charis Yulianto
