= Arif Suyono =

Indonesian association footballer

Personal information
- Full name: Arif Suyono
- Date of birth: 3 January 1984 (age 42)
- Place of birth: Batu, Indonesia
- Height: 5 ft 7 in (1.70 m)
- Position: Winger

Youth career
- 2000: SSB Wastra Indah
- 2001: PS Putra Jaya Batu
- 2001–2002: Arema Malang
- 2002–2003: Persema Malang

Senior career*
Years	Team	Apps	(Gls)
2003–2004	Persema Malang	25	(4)
2004–2009	Arema Malang	102	(28)
2009–2011	Sriwijaya	39	(9)
2011–2013	Mitra Kukar	52	(3)
2014–2017	Arema FC	39	(3)
2018–2019	Mitra Kukar	37	(1)
2020	Putra Sinar Giri	0	(0)
2021	Persekat Tegal	4	(0)
2022	PSMS Medan	2	(0)
Total		300	(49)

International career
2003	Indonesia U19	4	(0)
2007	Indonesia U23	8	(2)
2008–2010	Indonesia	21	(4)

Managerial career
- 2025–: Persikoba Batu
Medal record
Men's football
Representing Indonesia
AFF Championship
Runner-up	2010 Indonesia & Vietnam	Team
- * Club domestic league appearances and goals

Arif Suyono (born 3 January 1984 in Batu, East Java) is an Indonesian former footballer who plays as a winger, whose nickname is Keceng, refers to his skinny appearance.

== Club career ==
Before plays in Mitra Kukar, he played in the team Sriwijaya, Arema Indonesia and Persema Malang. He is one of the Indonesian football players in the sector of wing midfielder or attacker. Prior to his career in the senior national team, he also had involved in the U-19 national team and played in the U-23 team for the Southeast Asian Games in 2007.

He is among the squad for Arema Malang to win the Piala Indonesia in two consecutive years, 2005 and 2006.

== International goals ==
Arif Suyono: International goals
No.	Date	Venue	Opponent	Score	Result	Competition
1	25 August 2008	Gelora Bung Karno Stadium, Jakarta, Indonesia	Myanmar	1–0	4–0	2008 Indonesia Independence Cup
2	25 August 2008	Gelora Bung Karno Stadium, Jakarta, Indonesia	Myanmar	2–0	4–0	2008 Indonesia Independence Cup
3	1 December 2010	Gelora Bung Karno Stadium, Jakarta, Indonesia	Malaysia	4–1	5–1	2010 AFF Suzuki Cup
4	4 December 2010	Gelora Bung Karno Stadium, Jakarta, Indonesia	Laos	5–0	6–0	2010 AFF Suzuki Cup

== Honours ==
Arema

- Copa Indonesia: 2005, 2006
- Indonesian Inter Island Cup: 2014/15
- Indonesia President's Cup: 2017

Sriwijaya

- Piala Indonesia: 2010

Indonesia

- Indonesian Independence Cup: 2008
- AFF Championship runner-up: 2010
