= Budi Sudarsono =

Indonesian association football player

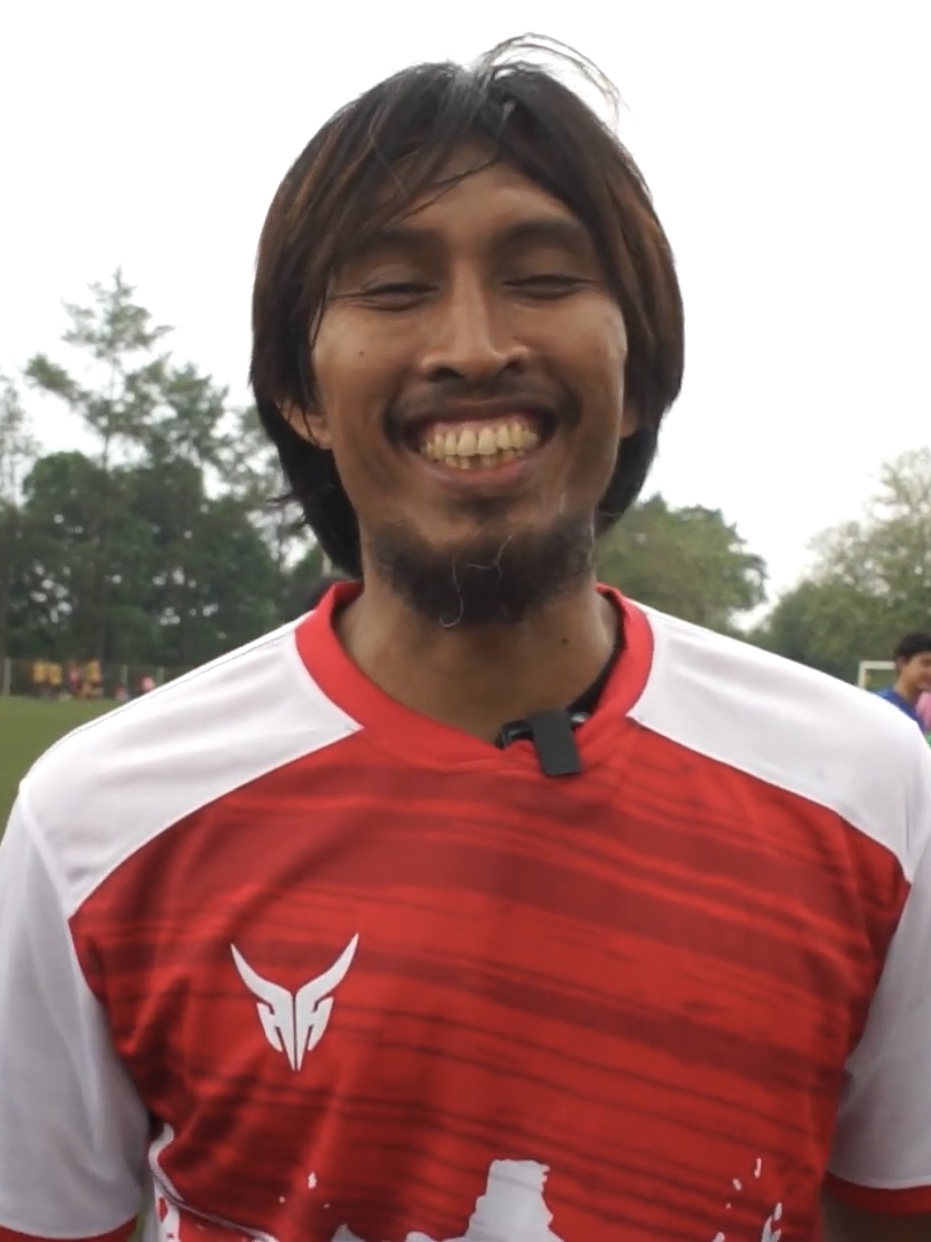
- Sudarsono in July 2020

Personal information
- Full name: Budi Sudarsono
- Date of birth: 19 September 1979 (age 47)
- Place of birth: Kediri, Indonesia
- Height: 1.74 m (5 ft 9 in)
- Position: Forward

Senior career*
Years	Team	Apps	(Gls)
1999–2001	Persebaya Surabaya	28	(15)
2002	Persija Jakarta	19	(3)
2003	Deltras	32	(19)
2004	Persija Jakarta	12	(6)
2005–2007	Persik Kediri	69	(21)
2007–2008	PDRM FA		
2008–2009	Sriwijaya	27	(5)
2009–2010	Persib Bandung	23	(2)
2010–2011	Sriwijaya	21	(11)
2011–2014	Deltras	15	(2)
2014–2015	Persikabo Bogor	17	(3)

International career
2001	Indonesia U23		(2)
2001–2010	Indonesia	48	(15)

Managerial career
- 2017–2018: Kalteng Putra (Assistant)
- 2018–2020: Persik Kediri (Assistant)
- 2019–2020: PS Batam
- 2020–2021: Persik Kediri
- 2021–2022: Belitong (Academy Director)
- 2022–2023: Putra Menoreh (Technical Director)
- 2024–2025: Dejan
- 2025–2026: Sriwijaya
Medal record
Men's football
Representing Indonesia
Indonesia Independence Cup
Winner	2008 Indonesia
- * Club domestic league appearances and goals

Budi Sudarsono (born 19 September 1979 in Kediri, East Java) is an Indonesian former footballer and a football coach. He is most recently the head coach of Championship club Sriwijaya. He played either as an attacking midfielder or a forward.

He played for Persik Kediri in the 2007 AFC Champions League group stage, where he scored two goals.

== International career ==
He has made several appearances for the Indonesia national football team, and is best remembered for scoring goals in two consecutive Asian Cup tournaments. He opened his account by scoring a goal in the 2004 Asian Cup for Indonesia against Qatar in a group A game which Indonesia ended up winning 2–1. It was Indonesia's first ever victory in Asian Cup history since their first participation in Asian Cup 1996. His fans have nicknamed him Budi Gol, Budi Jancok, Kileng, Budi Drogba (for his resemblance to the Ivorian striker Didier Drogba), and Ular Piton (Python). He scored the only goal for Indonesia against Syria during the 2010 FIFA World Cup qualification in Jakarta in which Indonesia went on to lose 1–4 and lose the 2nd leg 0–7 and eliminated from the competition. Recently in December 2008, he scored hattrick and led Indonesia win 4–0 against Cambodia in AFF Suzuki Cup. He also scored a goal in the 2011 AFC Asian Cup qualification against Kuwait in Jakarta which ended with the score 1–1.

== Career statistics ==
=== International ===
Appearances and goals by national team and year
National team	Year	Apps	Goals
Indonesia	2001	2	0
Indonesia	2002	6	2
Indonesia	2003	5	0
Indonesia	2004	11	2
Indonesia	2006	1	0
Indonesia	2007	9	2
Indonesia	2008	9	8
Indonesia	2009	3	1
Indonesia	2010	2	0
Total		48	15

Scores and results list Indonesia's goal tally first, score column indicates score after each Budi goal.

List of international goals scored by Budi Sudarsono
No.	Date	Venue	Opponent	Score	Result	Competition
1	21 December 2002	Gelora Bung Karno Stadium, Jakarta, Indonesia	Vietnam	1–0	2–2	2002 Tiger Cup
2	23 December 2002	Gelora Bung Karno Stadium, Jakarta, Indonesia	Philippines	3–0	13–1	2002 Tiger Cup
3	31 March 2004	Ashgabat Olympic Stadium, Ashgabat, Turkmenistan	Turkmenistan	1–1	1–3	2006 FIFA World Cup qualification
4	18 July 2004	Workers Stadium, Beijing, China	Qatar	1–0	2–1	2004 AFC Asian Cup
5	10 July 2007	Gelora Bung Karno Stadium, Jakarta, Indonesia	Bahrain	1–0	2–1	2007 AFC Asian Cup
6	9 November 2007	Gelora Bung Karno Stadium, Jakarta, Indonesia	Syria	1–2	1–4	2010 FIFA World Cup qualification
7	21 August 2008	Gelora Bung Karno Stadium, Jakarta, Indonesia	Cambodia	2–0	7–0	2008 Indonesia Independence Cup
8	21 August 2008	Gelora Bung Karno Stadium, Jakarta, Indonesia	Cambodia	3–0	7–0	2008 Indonesia Independence Cup
9	21 August 2008	Gelora Bung Karno Stadium, Jakarta, Indonesia	Cambodia	4–0	7–0	2008 Indonesia Independence Cup
10	21 August 2008	Gelora Bung Karno Stadium, Jakarta, Indonesia	Cambodia	5–0	7–0	2008 Indonesia Independence Cup
11	5 December 2008	Gelora Bung Karno Stadium, Jakarta, Indonesia	Myanmar	1–0	3–0	2008 AFF Suzuki Cup
12	7 December 2008	Gelora Bung Karno Stadium, Jakarta, Indonesia	Cambodia	1–0	4–0	2008 AFF Suzuki Cup
13	7 December 2008	Gelora Bung Karno Stadium, Jakarta, Indonesia	Cambodia	2–0	4–0	2008 AFF Suzuki Cup
14	7 December 2008	Gelora Bung Karno Stadium, Jakarta, Indonesia	Cambodia	3–0	4–0	2008 AFF Suzuki Cup
15	18 December 2009	Gelora Bung Karno Stadium, Jakarta, Indonesia	Kuwait	1–0	1–1	2011 AFC Asian Cup qualification

== Family ==
Budi Sudarsono is the eldest child of six in his family. His father is Saifulloh and his mother is Murwani.

== Participation in national team ==
- Pre-World Cup Qualifying 2001
- SEA Games 2001
- Tiger Cup 2002
- Asian Cup 2004
- AFF Cup 2006
- Asian Cup 2007
- Independence Cup
- Grand Royal Challenge Cup 2008 Myanmar
- AFF Suzuki Cup 2008

== Honours ==
Persija Jakarta

- Liga Indonesia Premier Division: 2001

Persik Kediri

- Liga Indonesia Premier Division: 2006

Sriwijaya

- Copa Indonesia: 2008–09
- Indonesian Community Shield: 2010

Indonesia

- Indonesian Independence Cup: 2008
- AFF Championship runner-up: 2002
