= Charis Yulianto =

Indonesian footballer

Personal information
- Date of birth: 11 July 1978 (age 48)
- Place of birth: Blitar, East Java, Indonesia
- Height: 1.83 m (6 ft 0 in)
- Position: Centre-back

Youth career
- 1994: PSBI Blitar
- 1995: Persebaya Surabaya
- 1995–1996: PSSI Baretti

Senior career*
Years	Team	Apps	(Gls)
1997–2002	Arema Malang	88	(0)
2003–2004	PSM Makassar	52	(1)
2005	Persija Jakarta	35	(1)
2006	Persib Bandung	28	(2)
2007–2010	Sriwijaya	62	(3)
2010–2011	Persela Lamongan	28	(0)
2011–2012	Arema Malang	17	(0)
Total		230	(7)

International career
2004–2010	Indonesia	36	(2)

Managerial career
- 2018–2019: Borneo (Assistant coach)
- 2020–2021: Arema (Assistant coach)
- 2021: NZR Sumbersari (Head coach)
- 2022: Persela (Assistant coach)
- 2023: Indonesia (Assistant coach)
- 2023: PSCS (Head coach)
- 2025–: Batavia (Head coach)
- * Club domestic league appearances and goals

Charis Yulianto (born 11 July 1978) is an Indonesian former footballer who played as a centre-back. He made his debut in the Indonesia national team in October 2004 during Peter White's coaching period. Throughout his career he has collected 36 caps with the Red and Whites.

== International career ==
Yulianto's debut in the senior national team squad was in a World Cup qualifying match against Saudi Arabia on 12 October 2004. Indonesia lost the match 3–1. Charis Yulianto was captain of the Indonesia national football team in 2008–2010. He assumed the captain's armband for the Indonesia national football team replacing Ponaryo Astaman.

Charis retired from the Indonesia national football team in 2010. During his six years playing for the Indonesia national football team, the player from Blitar made 36 appearances and scored two goals. After retiring, he founded the Charis Yulianto Football Academy to produce new professional football players in Indonesia.

== Personal life ==
Charis was born to Supaman and Sutini. He is the youngest of their 9 children.

== Career statistics ==
International goals scored by Charis Yulianto
No.	Date	Venue	Opponent	Score	Result	Competition
1	3 January 2005	Bukit Jalil National Stadium, Kuala Lumpur, Malaysia	Malaysia	2–1	4–1	2004 Tiger Cup
2	21 August 2008	Gelora Bung Karno Stadium, Jakarta, Indonesia	Cambodia	1–0	7–0	2008 Indonesia Independence Cup

== Major international tournaments ==
- 2004 Tiger Cup
- 2007 AFC Asian Cup
- 2008 AFF Suzuki Cup

== Honours ==
Persija Jakarta

- Liga Indonesia Premier Division runner up: 2005
- Copa Indonesia runner-up: 2005

Sriwijaya

- Liga Indonesia Premier Division: 2007–08
- Copa Indonesia/Piala Indonesia: 2007–08, 2008–09, 2010

Indonesia

- AFF Championship runner-up: 2004

Preceded by Ponaryo Astaman	Indonesian Captain; 2008–2010	Succeeded by Bambang Pamungkas
