= Jeong Kwang-sik =

South Korean footballer (born 1985)

Kwang-Sik
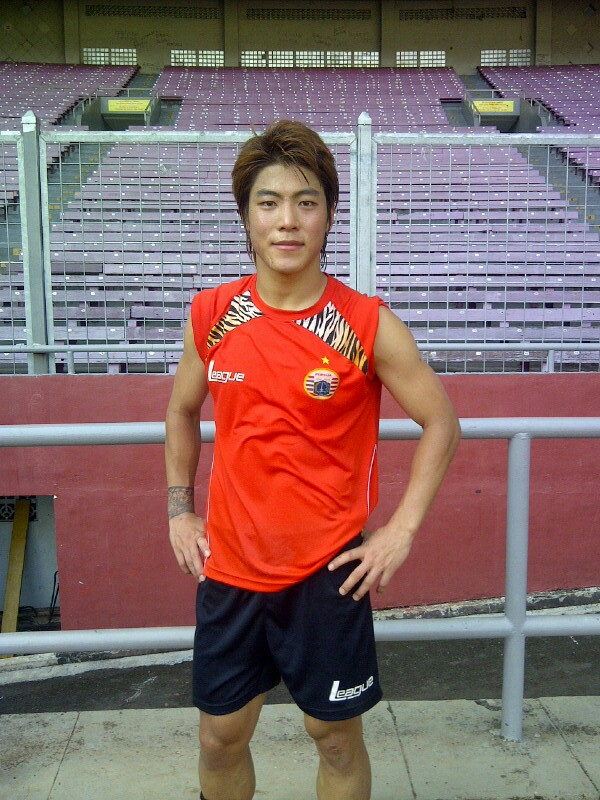

Personal information
- Full name: Jeong Kwang-Sik
- Date of birth: July 12, 1985 (age 41)
- Place of birth: South Korea
- Height: 1.79 m (5 ft 10 in)
- Position: Midfielder

Youth career
- 2003−2005: Vasco da Gama

Senior career*
Years	Team	Apps	(Gls)
2005	Changwon City		
2006	Yesan FC	12	(1)
2007	Gainare Tottori	3	(0)
2008	Fujieda MYFC	7	(1)
2009–2010	Suzuka Unlimited FC	22	(7)
2011	Brisbane City		
2012	Persija Jakarta	17	(2)
2015	Chamchuri United	11	(2)
2016	Madura United		
- * Club domestic league appearances and goals as of 19:20, 11 July 2012 (UTC)

- Jeong Kwang-sik
- Hangul: 정광식
- RR: Jeong Gwangsik
- MR: Chŏng Kwangsik

Jeong Kwang-Sik (born July 12, 1985) is a South Korean former footballer who plays as a midfielder.

In 2016 he played for Madura United.
