= Abdalla Mohamed =

Egyptian handball player

Personal information
- Full name: Abdalla Ali Mohamed
- Nationality: Egypt
- Born: 26 August 1978 (age 48)
- Height: 1.92 m (6 ft 4 in)

Sport
- Sport: Handball

Senior clubs
- Years: Team
- 2004-2006: Zamalek SC
National team
- Years: Team
- 2004: Egypt

Abdalla Ali Mohamed (عبد الله علي محمد, born 26 August 1978) is an Egyptian male handball player. He was a member of the Egypt men's national handball team. He was a part of the team at the 2004 Summer Olympics. On club level he played for Zamalek SC in Egypt.
