= Johan Juansyah =

Indonesian footballer

Personal information
- Full name: Johan Juansyah
- Date of birth: 25 October 1988 (age 38)
- Place of birth: Garut, West Java, Indonesia
- Height: 1.72 m (5 ft 7 1/2 in)
- Position: Midfielder

Youth career
- 2003–2005: Persigar Garut
- 2005–2006: Persib Bandung
- 2006–2008: Persijap Jepara

Senior career*
Years	Team	Apps	(Gls)
2008–2011	Persijap Jepara	55	(6)
2011–2014	Persija Jakarta	22	(3)
2014–2017	Persikabo Bogor		
2016–2017	→ PSCS Cilacap (loan)		

International career
2009–2011	Indonesia U23	4	(0)
2010	Indonesia	1	(0)
- * Club domestic league appearances and goals

Johan Juansyah (born 25 October 1988 in Garut) is an Indonesian former footballer.

== Club career ==
He is playing in the Indonesian Super League club Persatuan Sepakbola Indonesia Jepara.

== International career ==
In 2009, Johan played to represent the Indonesia national under-23 football team in Sea Games 2009 and his debut international in senior team when Indonesia win 2-0 with Chinese Taipei at Gelora Sriwijaya Stadium.

== Honours ==
Indonesia

- AFF Championship runner-up: 2010

== External sources ==
- Profile at liga-indonesia.co.id
- Profile at goal.com
