= 2008 Indonesia Independence Cup =

Tournament details
- Host country: Indonesia
- Dates: 21–29 August
- Venue: 1 (in 1 host city)

Final positions
- Champions: Indonesia (3rd title)
- Runners-up: Libya
- Third place: Indonesia U-21

Tournament statistics
- Matches played: 10
- Goals scored: 44 (4.4 per match)
- Attendance: 131,700 (13,170 per match)
- Top scorer: (Libya) Zaghb Anis
- Best player: (Libya) Zaghb Anis

The 2008 Indonesian Independence Cup (also known as Pertamina Independence Cup 2008) was held at the Gelora Bung Karno Stadium in Jakarta, Indonesia. It was the 8th time the championship had been played since its inception in 1985. It marked the first time since 2000 that the championship was being held.

The tournament was played between 21 and 29 August and included national teams from Cambodia, Libya U-23, Myanmar and Brunei DPMM FC, as well as, two teams from the host nation, the Indonesia national team and the Indonesia U-21 national team. Teams from Europe, United States and Japan had been invited but declined to participate due to the timing of the event.

The final game ended in controversy as the Libyan team refused to return to the field for the second half although leading 1 - 0. The Libyan team walked out following an incident between two coaches from each team. As a result, Indonesia was awarded 3 goals and declared the winner of the tournament. The Libyan team accused a member of the Indonesia team of hitting Libya coach Gamal Adeen Nowara in the tunnel at halftime.

== Teams ==
- Brunei
- Cambodia
- Indonesia U-21
- Indonesia (Host)
- Libya U-23
- Myanmar

== Stadiums ==
City	Stadium	Capacity
Jakarta	Gelora Bung Karno	100,000

== Group stages ==
All times local (UTC+7)

=== Group A ===
Team	Pld	W	D	L	GF	GA	GD	Pts
Libya U-23	2	2	0	0	9	2	+7	6
Indonesia U-21	2	1	0	1	3	4	-1	3
Brunei	2	0	0	2	1	7	-6	0

21 August 2008
18:30

Brunei	0 – 2	Indonesia U-21
	Report	Novriansyah 57'; Mulyana 88'

Gelora Bung Karno
Attendance: 1,000

23 August 2008
18:30

Indonesia U-21	1 – 4	Libya U-23
Mulyana 75'	Report	Mohamed 25'; Allafi 37'; Salem 44'; Anis 62'

Gelora Bung Karno

25 August 2008
18:30

Brunei	1 – 5	Libya U-23
Shahrazen 82'	Report	Masoud 10'; Anis 21'; Eisa 35'; Ali 52'; Abdalla 71'

Gelora Bung Karno
Attendance: 1,500

=== Group B ===
Team	Pld	W	D	L	GF	GA	GD	Pts
Indonesia	2	2	0	0	11	0	+11	6
Myanmar	2	1	0	1	7	5	+2	3
Cambodia	2	0	0	2	1	-14	-13	0

21 August 2008
21:15

Cambodia	0 – 7	Indonesia
	Report	Yulianto 8'; Budi S. 11', 28', 30', 36'; M. Ilham 51'; Bambang P. 88'

Gelora Bung Karno Stadium
Attendance: 1,200

22 August 2008
21:45

Myanmar	7 – 1	Cambodia
Khin 7'; Thien 21', 45', 76'; Min 50'; Yan 62', 87'	Report	Borey 17'

Gelora Bung Karno Stadium
Attendance: 3,000

25 August 2008
22:30

Indonesia	4 – 0	Myanmar
Suyono 6', 19'; M. Ilham 48'; Bambang P. 77'	Report

Gelora Bung Karno Stadium

== Knockout stages ==
All times local (UTC+7)

=== Knockout map ===
Semi-finals
27 August - Jakarta
Libya U-23	5
Myanmar	3
27 August - Jakarta
Indonesia U-21	0
Indonesia	1

Final
29 August - Jakarta
Indonesia	3
Libya U-23	1
Third place
29 August - Jakarta
Myanmar	0
Indonesia U-21	1

=== Semi finals ===
27 August 2008
21:15

Libya U-23	5 – 3	Myanmar
Anis 26', 35', 54'; Abdalla 40'; Ali 84'	Report	Min 1', 42'; Paing 75'(pen)

Gelora Bung Karno
Attendance: 5,000

27 August 2008
18:30

Indonesia U-21	0 – 1	Indonesia
	Report	Astaman 20'

Gelora Bung Karno
Attendance: 20,000

=== Finals ===
29 August 2008
21:15

Libya U-23	1 – 3*	Indonesia
Abdalla 13'	Report

Gelora Bung Karno
Attendance: 50,000

Note: The match was cancelled at half time as Libya withdrew due to an altercation between two coaches of each team. Indonesia instantly awarded 3 goals.

=== Third Place ===
29 August 2008
18:30

Indonesia U-21	1 – 0	Myanmar
Mulyana 10'	Report

Gelora Bung Karno
Attendance: 50,000

== Winners ==
2008 Indonesia Independence Cup winner

Indonesia
3rd title
