= Pedro Velázquez =

Paraguayan footballer (born 1983)

Personal information
- Full name: Pedro Javier Velázquez Insfran
- Date of birth: 13 May 1983 (age 43)
- Place of birth: Paraguarí, Paraguay
- Height: 1.84 m (6 ft 0 in)
- Position: Forward

Team information
- Current team: Borneo Samarinda (assistant coach)

Senior career*
Years	Team	Apps	(Gls)
2000–2003	Libertad		
2003	Sport Colombia		
2004	Guaraní		
2005	Sol de América		
2005–2006	Semen Padang	33	(17)
2006–2007	PSDS Deli Serdang	16	(8)
2007–2008	Persibom Bolaang Mongondow	31	(15)
2008	Deportes Puerto Montt		
2008–2009	Deportes Iquique		
2009–2010	Sportivo Luqueño		
2010	Guabirá	19	(4)
2011	Universitario	11	(4)
2011	The Strongest		
2011–2013	Persija Jakarta	42	(22)
2013	Fortaleza	8	(0)
2014	Gresik United	10	(4)
2015	Persela Lamongan	2	(0)
2015	OFK Petrovac	0	(0)
2016	Pusamania Borneo	32	(14)

International career
2003	Paraguay U20	1	(0)

Managerial career
- 2025–: Borneo Samarinda (assistant)
- * Club domestic league appearances and goals

Pedro Velázquez (born 13 May 1983) is a Paraguayan professional football coach and former player who played as a forward. He is assistant coach of Liga 1 club Borneo Samarinda.

Velázquez participated in 2003 South American Youth Championship with the Paraguay national under-20 team.

== Career ==
In January 2015, he signed with Persela Lamongan.

== Honours ==
Libertad

- Segunda División: 2000
- Primera División: 2002
