= 2006 Merdeka Tournament =

2006 Pestabola Merdeka
Tournament details
- Host country: Malaysia
- Dates: 23–29 August
- Teams: 4
- Venue(s): 1 (in 1 host city)

Final positions
- Champions: Myanmar (4th title)
- Runners-up: Indonesia

Tournament statistics
- Matches played: 7
- Goals scored: 16 (2.29 per match)

The 2006 Merdeka Tournament is the 38th editions of the Merdeka Tournament and was held on 23 to 29 August 2006. This is the first edition not played at Merdeka Stadium in Kuala Lumpur which is being refurbished. All matches played at Shah Alam Stadium in Shah Alam, Selangor.

== Groups ==
=== Group stage ===
Teams qualified for next phase

Single Group Stage

Team	Pts	Pld	W	D	L	GF	GA	GD
Myanmar	5	3	1	2	0	4	3	+1
Indonesia	5	3	1	2	0	2	1	+1
Malaysia	4	3	1	1	1	4	4	0
Thailand U-23	1	3	0	1	2	3	5	−2

23 August
18:30

Myanmar	2–2	Thailand U-23
Si Thu Win 35', 70'	Report	Winothai 19', 45+1'

Shah Alam Stadium, Shah Alam, Selangor

23 August
20:30

Malaysia	1–1	Indonesia
Ridwan 77' (o.g.)	Report	Pamungkas 15'

Shah Alam Stadium, Shah Alam, Selangor

25 August
18:30

Indonesia	0–0	Myanmar
	Report

Shah Alam Stadium, Shah Alam, Selangor

25 August
20:30

Thailand U-23	1–2	Malaysia
Chanabut 62'	Report	Mahayuddin 40', 78'

Shah Alam Stadium, Shah Alam, Selangor

27 August
18:30

Thailand U-23	0–1	Indonesia
	Report	Sutha 27'

Shah Alam Stadium, Shah Alam, Selangor

27 August
20:30

Malaysia	1–2	Myanmar
Mahayuddin 13' (pen.)	Report	Kyaw Thu Ra 52'; Soe Myat Min 59'

Shah Alam Stadium, Shah Alam, Selangor

== Knockout stage ==
=== Finals ===
29 August
20:30

Myanmar	2–1	Indonesia
Kyaw Thu Ra 61'; Soe Myat Min 85'	Report	Zaenal Arif 87'

Shah Alam Stadium, Shah Alam, Selangor

== Award ==
2006 Merdeka Tournament winner

Myanmar
4th title
