= Muhammad Ilham =

Indonesian footballer

Personal information
- Full name: Muhammad Ilham
- Date of birth: 22 January 1981 (age 45)
- Place of birth: Majene, Indonesia
- Height: 1.67 m (5 ft 5 1/2 in)
- Position: Winger

Senior career*
Years	Team	Apps	(Gls)
2000−2002	PSPS Pekanbaru	12	(0)
2002−2004	Petrokimia Putra	18	(2)
2004−2005	Pelita Krakatau Steel	19	(2)
2005–2006	Persikota Tangerang	18	(2)
2006−2010	Persija Jakarta	102	(14)
2010−2011	Persib Bandung	31	(3)
2011−2012	PSPS Pekanbaru	13	(0)
2012−2013	Persija Jakarta	17	(4)
2013−2014	Persebaya ISL (Bhayangkara)	26	(1)
2014−2016	Persija Jakarta	13	(5)
Total		269	(33)

International career
2008−2011	Indonesia	20	(3)
- * Club domestic league appearances and goals

Muhammad Ilham (born 22 January 1981 in Majene), usually called M. Ilham is an Indonesian former professional football player. He is famous for his stepovers and dribbling skills. He can play with both feet, and he currently plays the position of a winger.

== Club career ==
On 1 December 2014, he signed with Persija Jakarta.

== International career ==
Muhammad Ilham: International goals
No.	Date	Venue	Opponent	Score	Result	Competition
1	21 August 2008	Gelora Bung Karno Stadium, Jakarta, Indonesia	Cambodia	6–0	7–0	2008 Indonesia Independence Cup
2	25 August 2008	Gelora Bung Karno Stadium, Jakarta, Indonesia	Myanmar	3–0	4–0	2008 Indonesia Independence Cup
3	23 July 2011	Ashgabat Olympic Stadium, Ashgabat, Turkmenistan	Turkmenistan	1–1	1–1	2014 FIFA World Cup qualification

== Honours ==
Indonesia

Winner

- Indonesian Independence Cup: 2008
