= Eric Bayemi =

Cameroonian footballer

Personal information
- Full name: Eric Arsène Bayemi Maemble
- Date of birth: October 11, 1983 (age 43)
- Place of birth: Yaoundé, Cameroon
- Height: 1.86 m (6 ft 1 in)
- Position: Defender

Senior career*
Years	Team	Apps	(Gls)
2006	Fovu Baham		
2008	Felda United		
2009	Dnepr Mogilev	18	(0)
2010–2011	Persija Jakarta	21	(1)
2011–2014	Persidafon Dafonsoro	71	(12)
- * Club domestic league appearances and goals as of 11 July 2012

Eric Arsène Bayemi Maemble (born October 11, 1983) is a Cameroonian former professional footballer. He most recently played for Persidafon Dafonsoro.
