= I Wayan Gangga Mudana =

Indonesian footballer

Gangga Mudana
Personal information
- Full name: I Wayan Gangga Mudana
- Date of birth: 24 April 1981 (age 45)
- Place of birth: Jimbaran, Indonesia
- Height: 1.75 m (5 ft 9 in)
- Position: Midfielder

Senior career*
Years	Team	Apps	(Gls)
1999–2004	Persekaba Badung		(1)
2005	Persegi Gianyar		(0)
2006	Persmin Minahasa		(1)
2007–2009	Persija Jakarta	38	(0)
2009–2010	Persela Lamongan	28	(0)
2010–2011	Persisam Putra Samarinda	14	(0)
2011–2012	Persija Jakarta	1	(0)
2012	Gresik United	14	(0)
2013	Persiba Balikpapan	5	(0)
2014	Pusamania Borneo F.C.	0	(0)
- * Club domestic league appearances and goals as of 22:47, 28 October 2014 (UTC)

I Wayan Gangga Mudana (born April 24, 1981) is an Indonesian footballer who played for Pusamania Borneo F.C. before retiring as a professional football player.
