= Bambang Pamungkas =

Indonesian football manager and former player (born 1980)

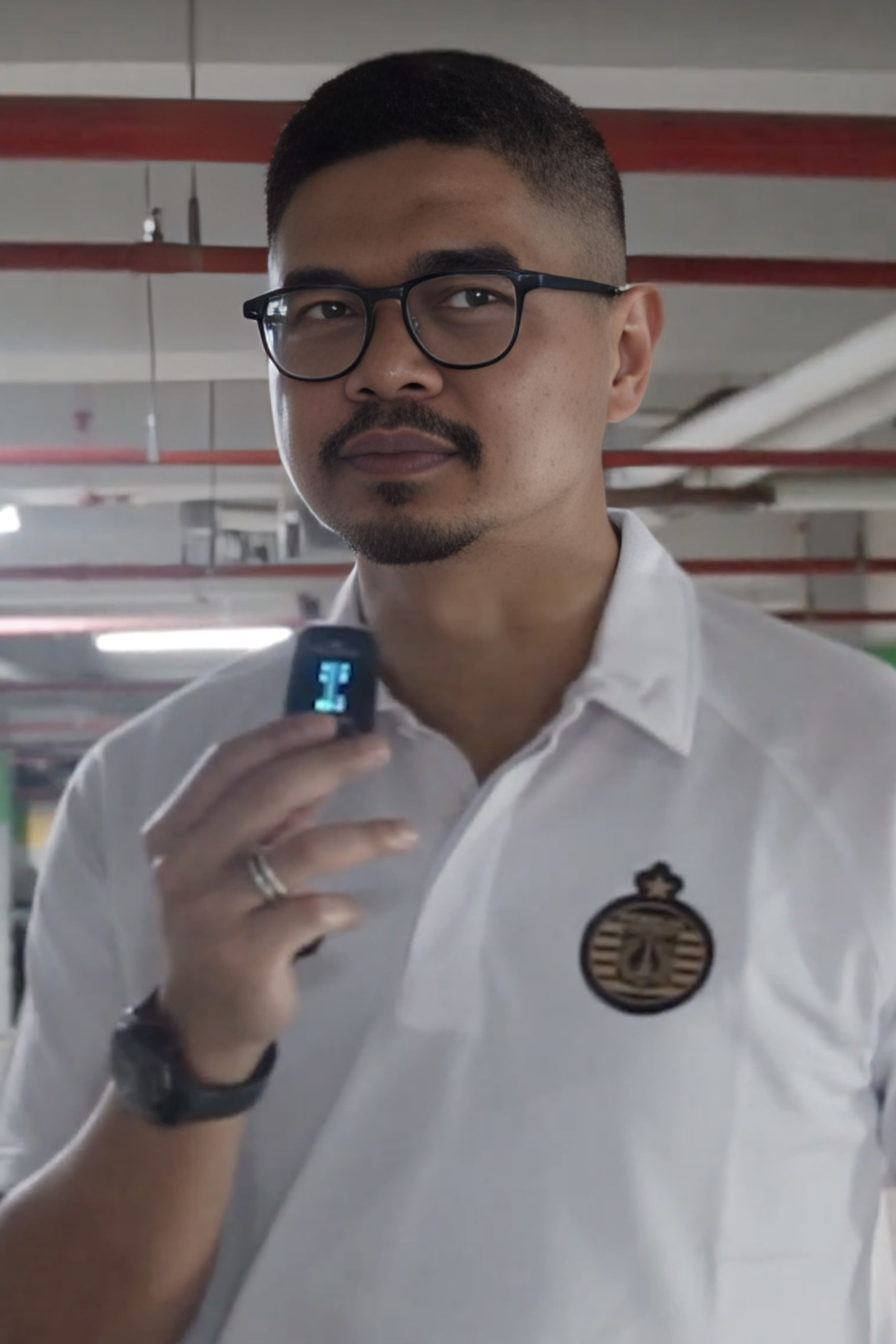
- Bambang in August 2024

Personal information
- Full name: Bambang Pamungkas
- Date of birth: 10 June 1980 (age 46)
- Place of birth: Semarang Regency, Indonesia
- Height: 1.70 m (5 ft 7 in)
- Position: Forward

Youth career
- 1988–1989: SSB Hobby Sepakbola Getas
- 1989–1993: SSB Ungaran Serasi
- 1993–1994: Persada Utama Ungaran
- 1994–1996: Persikas Semarang Regency
- 1996–1999: Diklat Salatiga

Senior career*
Years	Team	Apps	(Gls)
1999–2005	Persija Jakarta	166	(92)
2000	→ EHC Norad (loan)	14	(8)
2005–2007	Selangor	64	(42)
2007–2013	Persija Jakarta	192	(140)
2013–2014	Pelita Bandung Raya	24	(10)
2015–2019	Persija Jakarta	78	(24)
Total		538	(316)

International career
1999–2012	Indonesia	86	(38)

Managerial career
- 2020–2022: Persija Jakarta
Medal record
Men's football
Representing Indonesia
AFF Championship
Runner-up	2000 Thailand
Runner-up	2002 Indonesia & Singapore
Runner-up	2010 Indonesia & Vietnam
Sea Games
Bronze medal – third place	1999 Brunei	Team
Indonesia Independence Cup
Winner	2000 Indonesia
Winner	2008 Indonesia
- * Club domestic league appearances and goals

Bambang Pamungkas (born 10 June 1980) is an Indonesian football manager and former player. As a footballer, he predominantly played for Persija Jakarta and the Indonesia national football team. His natural position is striker. Pamungkas made his name in South East Asian football when he scored the only goal for Indonesia at the 2002 Tiger Cup semifinal against Malaysia, and was the tournament's top scorer with eight goals. He is regarded as one of the best striker in Southeast Asia and Asia.

Pamungkas is considered to be an Indonesian living legend and most successful player in Indonesia. He is known with an outstanding header of the ball, and has a reputation for sharpness in the penalty box. He earned 85 caps and 37 goals with the Indonesia national team, and is perhaps the team's most popular player among its supporters. He was considered one of top ten Asian players of 2012 by ESPN Soccernet.

== Club career ==
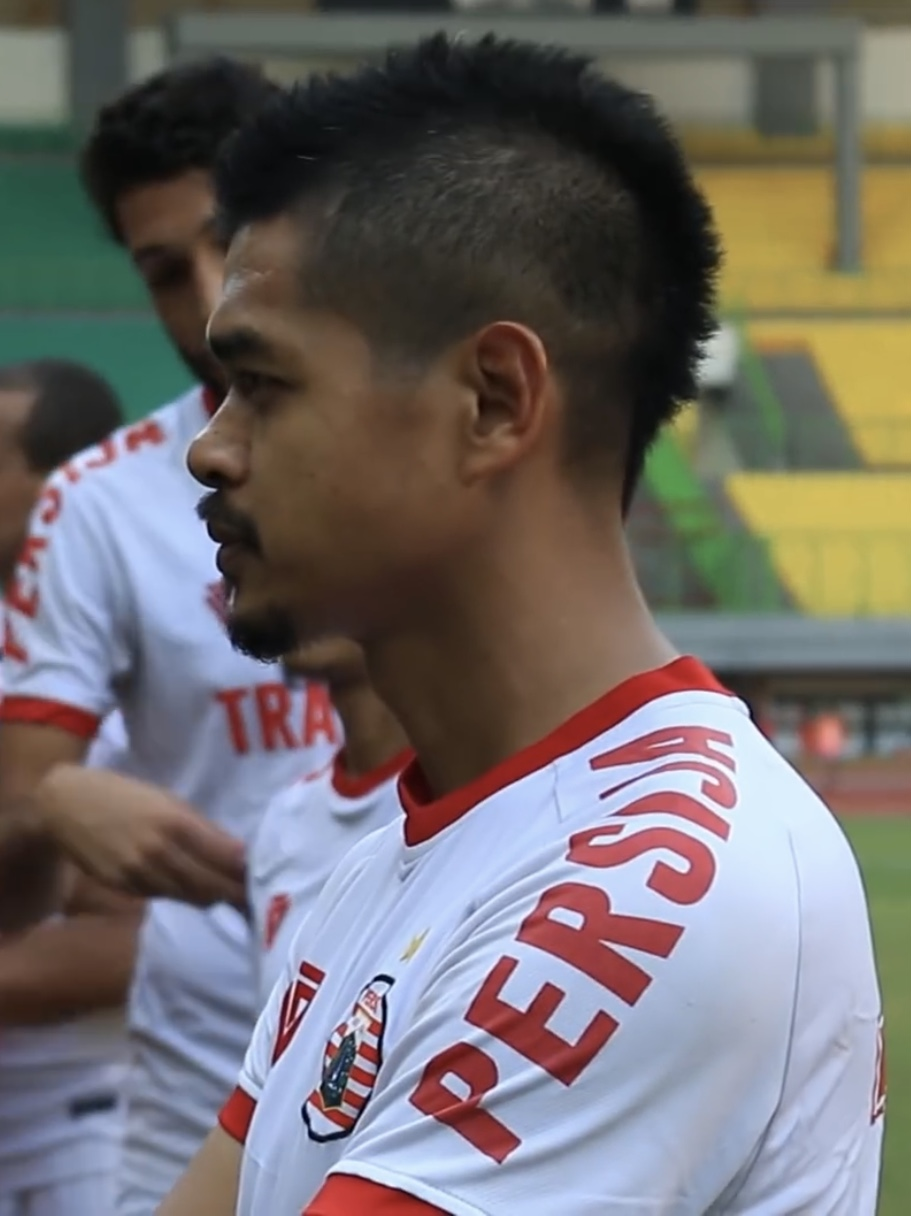
Bambang with Persija Jakarta in 2017

Bambang played for several clubs around his hometown as a youth, before beginning his senior career with Persija Jakarta. He was the club's top goalscorer in 1999–2000 Liga Indonesia with 24 goals. In 2000, he joined EHC Norad in the Dutch Third Division. But after only 4 months he returned to Persija, the only Indonesian club he ever played for.

Bambang helped his club to win the Liga Indonesia in 2001, and he was awarded the accolade of that season's best player. Persija Jakarta narrowly missed out on winning the championship again in 2004, by one point. The following season Persija reached the 2005 final, but lost 2–3 to Persipura Jayapura.

Shortly afterwards, Bambang accepted an offer to play in the Malaysian Football League with Selangor FA, along with national teammate Elie Aiboy. In his first season in Malaysia he won the Premier League Malaysia, FA Cup Malaysia, and Malaysia Cup, and became the league's top-scorer with 23 goals in 24 matches. During two seasons in Malaysia he scored 63 goals in four competitions: Malaysia Premier League, Malaysia Super League, FA Cup Malaysia, Malaysia Cup, AFC Cup. Despite having scored a total of 178 goals in Liga Indonesia, like Singaporean forward Indra Sahdan Daud, Bambang lost his place in the nation team to foreign-born talents.

In 2008, despite interests from English club Derby County, he opted to stay in Indonesia.

In 2010, he had a trial at FC Ingolstadt 04 but failed to secure a contract.

On 9 December 2013, he signed a one-year contract with Pelita Bandung Raya.

On 3 December 2014, Bambang moved back to Persija. On 17 December 2019, he announced his retirement from professional football after 19 years. His last match was a 1–3 away win for Persija against Kalteng Putra F.C. at the Tuah Pahoe Stadium.

On 17 January 2020, a month after his retirement, Bambang was chosen to become Persija's manager.

== International career ==
In 1998 Bambang's international career began when he was selected to play for the Indonesian U-19 team. His tally of seven goals at the Asian Cup made him the competition's top scorer. He made his senior international debut the following year in a friendly match against Lithuania, in which he scored one goal.

Bambang has taken part in four FIFA World Cup qualification campaigns (2002, 2006, 2010 and 2014), playing in 14 matches and scoring 3 times. Bambang has also been involved in three AFC Asian Cups: 2000, 2004 and 2007. He scored a goal against Bahrain in the 2007 AFC Asian Cup, in a match Indonesia won 2–1.

In the 2002 Tiger Cup, Bambang was the top scorer with 8 goals, but an injury ruled him out of the Indonesian squad for the 2004 event. He scored twice in the 2008 AFF Suzuki Cup, once against Myanmar and once against Cambodia. In 2010 AFF Suzuki Cup Bambang scored two goals in a match against Thailand, both from penalty kicks. He has scored a total of 12 goals in the ASEAN Football Championship, making him the 5th-highest goalscorer in ASEAN Football Championship history.

== Outside football ==
=== Personal life ===
Pamungkas is married to Tribuana Tungga Dewi, with whom he has three daughters: Salsa Alicia, Jane Abel, Syaura Abana. The second youngest of 7 children. He initially had no thoughts of becoming a footballer. He likes reading and cooking, and has ambitions to become a teacher or a chef once his footballing career is over.

=== Philanthropy ===
Pamungkas devotes some of his free time to charity work, promoting the Bambang Pamungkas Foundation that he set up to provide financial assistance and resources to schools in Indonesia. He is also involved in raising funds for children's cancer charities.

=== Controversy ===
On 18 December 2011, following the match between Sriwijaya and Persija Jakarta, Pamungkas, Ismed Sofyan and Leo Saputra were involved in an assault on Hilton Moreira at his hotel, allegedly provoked by Moreira's behaviour during the match.

=== Public figure ===
As a well-known public figure, Pamungkas has appeared in many product endorsements, including for Biskuat, Ti Phone, Nike, Bodrex, and Kuku Bima.

The book Ketika Jemariku Menari details Pamungkas's life, career and teammates at club and national level, especially during the 2010 AFF Championship. Former Indonesian national team manager Ivan Venkov Kolev comments in the book that Pamungkas is "a rare striker in Indonesia. Commitment and professionalism are the hallmarks of these players".

Pamungkas has been chosen as a torch bearer for 2012 Summer Olympics flame passage through Calderdale on 24 June 2012.

== Career statistics ==
=== International ===
Indonesia national team
Year	Apps	Goals
1999	10	7
2000	1	0
2001	5	2
2002	7	8
2004	10	1
2006	3	1
2007	10	4
2008	12	7
2009	5	1
2010	13	3
2011	7	3
2012	2	0
Total	85	37

=== International goals ===
Scores and results list Indonesia's goal tally first.

No.	Date	Venue	Cap	Opponent	Score	Result	Competition
1	2 June 1999	Valga Keskstaadion, Valga, Estonia	1	Lithuania	2–2	2–2	Friendly
2	2 August 1999	Berakas Sports Complex, Bandar Seri Begawan, Brunei	3	Malaysia	3–0	6–0	1999 SEA Games
3	2 August 1999	Berakas Sports Complex, Bandar Seri Begawan, Brunei	3	Malaysia	4–0	6–0	1999 SEA Games
4	30 October 1999	Phnom Penh Olympic Stadium, Phnom Penh, Cambodia	8	Cambodia	2–0	5–1	2000 AFC Asian Cup qualification
5	14 November 1999	Senayan Stadium, Jakarta, Indonesia	9	Hong Kong	3–1	3–1	2000 AFC Asian Cup qualification
6	20 November 1999	Senayan Stadium, Jakarta, Indonesia	10	Cambodia	6–1	9–2	2000 AFC Asian Cup qualification
7	20 November 1999	Senayan Stadium, Jakarta, Indonesia	10	Cambodia	7–2	9–2	2000 AFC Asian Cup qualification
8	8 April 2001	Gelora Bung Karno Stadium, Jakarta, Indonesia	12	Maldives	5–0	5–0	2002 FIFA World Cup qualification
9	29 April 2001	Gelora Bung Karno Stadium, Jakarta, Indonesia	14	Cambodia	2–0	2–0	2002 FIFA World Cup qualification
10	17 December 2002	Gelora Bung Karno Stadium, Jakarta, Indonesia	19	Cambodia	2–2	4–2	2002 Tiger Cup
11	17 December 2002	Gelora Bung Karno Stadium, Jakarta, Indonesia	19	Cambodia	3–2	4–2	2002 Tiger Cup
12	17 December 2002	Gelora Bung Karno Stadium, Jakarta, Indonesia	19	Cambodia	4–2	4–2	2002 Tiger Cup
13	23 December 2002	Gelora Bung Karno Stadium, Jakarta, Indonesia	21	Philippines	1–0	13–1	2002 Tiger Cup
14	23 December 2002	Gelora Bung Karno Stadium, Jakarta, Indonesia	21	Philippines	4–0	13–1	2002 Tiger Cup
15	23 December 2002	Gelora Bung Karno Stadium, Jakarta, Indonesia	21	Philippines	5–0	13–1	2002 Tiger Cup
16	23 December 2002	Gelora Bung Karno Stadium, Jakarta, Indonesia	21	Philippines	12–1	13–1	2002 Tiger Cup
17	27 December 2002	Gelora Bung Karno Stadium, Jakarta, Indonesia	22	Malaysia	1–0	1–0	2002 Tiger Cup
18	12 February 2004	Amman International Stadium, Amman, Jordan	24	Jordan	1–0	1–2	Friendly
19	23 August 2006	Shah Alam Stadium, Shah Alam, Malaysia	34	Malaysia	1–0	1–1	2006 Pestabola Merdeka
20	1 June 2007	Gelora Bung Karno Stadium, Jakarta, Indonesia	40	Hong Kong	2–0	3–0	Friendly
21	21 June 2007	Gelora Bung Karno Stadium, Jakarta, Indonesia	41	Jamaica	1–0	2–1	Friendly
22	21 June 2007	Gelora Bung Karno Stadium, Jakarta, Indonesia	41	Jamaica	2–1	2–1	Friendly
23	10 July 2007	Gelora Bung Karno Stadium, Jakarta, Indonesia	43	Bahrain	2–1	2–1	2007 AFC Asian Cup
24	25 April 2008	Siliwangi Stadium, Bandung, Indonesia	47	Yemen	1–0	1–0	Friendly
25	6 June 2008	Gelora 10 November Stadium, Surabaya, Indonesia	48	Malaysia	1–0	1–1	Friendly
26	11 June 2008	Gelora 10 November Stadium, Surabaya, Indonesia	49	Vietnam	1–0	1–0	Friendly
27	21 August 2008	Gelora Bung Karno Stadium, Jakarta, Indonesia	50	Cambodia	7–0	7–0	2008 Indonesia Independence Cup
28	25 August 2008	Gelora Bung Karno Stadium, Jakarta, Indonesia	51	Myanmar	4–0	4–0	2008 Indonesia Independence Cup
29	5 December 2008	Gelora Bung Karno Stadium, Jakarta, Indonesia	54	Myanmar	3–0	3–0	2008 AFF Suzuki Cup
30	7 December 2008	Gelora Bung Karno Stadium, Jakarta, Indonesia	55	Cambodia	4–0	4–0	2008 AFF Suzuki Cup
31	14 November 2009	Al Kuwait Sports Club Stadium, Kuwait City, Kuwait	62	Kuwait	1–0	1–2	2011 AFC Asian Cup qualification
32	21 November 2010	Gelora Sriwijaya Stadium, Palembang, Indonesia	68	Timor-Leste	5–0	6–0	Friendly
33	7 December 2010	Gelora Bung Karno Stadium, Jakarta, Indonesia	72	Thailand	1–1	2–1	2010 AFF Suzuki Cup
34	7 December 2010	Gelora Bung Karno Stadium, Jakarta, Indonesia	72	Thailand	2–1	2–1	2010 AFF Suzuki Cup
35	22 August 2011	Manahan Stadium, Surakarta, Indonesia	77	Palestine	3–1	4–1	Friendly
36	22 August 2011	Manahan Stadium, Surakarta, Indonesia	77	Palestine	4–1	4–1	Friendly
37	15 November 2011	Gelora Bung Karno Stadium, Jakarta, Indonesia	83	Iran	1–3	1–4	2014 FIFA World Cup qualification
38	14 November 2012	Gelora Bung Karno Stadium, Jakarta, Indonesia	84	Timor-Leste	1–0	1–0	friendly

== Honours ==
Persija

- Super League (Indonesia): 2001, 2018
- Piala Presiden (Indonesia): 2018

Selangor

- Malaysia Premier League : 2005
- Malaysia Cup : 2005
- Malaysia FA Cup : 2005

Indonesia

- Indonesian Independence Cup: 2000, 2008
- AFF Championship runner-up: 2000, 2002, 2010
- Pestabola Merdeka runner-up: 2006
- SEA Games : (bronze) bronze 1999

Individual

- AFF Championship Top Scorer: 2002
- AFF Championship All-time XI: 2021
- Liga Indonesia Premier Division Top Goalscorer: 1999–2000
- Liga Indonesia Premier Division Best Player: 2001
- Malaysia Premier League Golden Boot: 2005 (23 goals)
- Malaysia Cup Best Foreign Player: 2005
- Malaysia Cup Top Scorer: 2005
- Malaysia FA Cup Top Scorer: 2005
- Copa Indonesia Best Player: 2007–08
- Indonesia Kids' Choice Awards favorite athlete: 2009
- IFFHS Men's All Time Indonesia Dream Team: 2022

Preceded by Charis Yulianto	Indonesian Captain; 2010–2012	Succeeded by Elie Aiboy
