= Ashari Danoe =

Indonesian footballer

Personal information
- Date of birth: 21 October 1932 (age 94)
- Position: Forward

Senior career*
Years	Team	Apps	(Gls)
- PSIS Semarang

International career
- Indonesia
- * Club domestic league appearances and goals

Ashari Danoe (born 21 October 1932) is an Indonesian former footballer. He competed in the men's tournament at the 1956 Summer Olympics.
