= Indonesian Independence Cup =

International football tournament

- Organiser(s): PSSI
- Founded: 1985; 41 years ago
- Region: Indonesia
- Current champions: Mali (1st title)
- Most championships: Indonesia (3 titles)
- 2025 Indonesian Independence Cup

The Indonesian Independence Cup (Indonesian: Piala Kemerdekaan) is an international football tournament organised by the Football Association of Indonesia to commemorate the independence day of the Republic of Indonesia. The tournament was held nine times from 1985 until its last edition in 2008. In 2025, this tournament was revived as a preparation event for the U-17 national team.

== Summary ==
Year	Final			Third place match		
Year	Winner	Score	Runner-up	Third place	Score	Fourth place
1985	Chile	1–0	South Korea B	Thailand	2–1	Tianjin
1986	Algeria	1–0 (a.e.t.)	Indonesia	(Brazil) America FC (RJ)	2–1	Romania U-18
1987	Indonesia	2–1 (a.e.t.)	Algeria	South Korea	(Note: Places decided by group position.)	Indonesia B
1988	China B	1–0	Australia U-20	Indonesia		Indonesia U-23
1990	Australia	3–0	Indonesia	Thailand U-23	1–0	Malaysia U-23
1992	Malaysia	2–0	South Korea	Australia		Indonesia
1994	Thailand	(Note: Unknown result, victory was to Thailand.)	Indonesia XI League	Indonesia U-23	(Note: Unknown result.)	South Korea
2000	Indonesia	3–0	Iraq B	Myanmar		Chinese Taipei
2008	Indonesia	3–1 (Note: Indonesia became the champion in the 2008 edition as Libya U-23 decided to 'pull out' in the second half despite leading the game with 1–0 score, therefore 3 goals were given to the hosts to become the champion.)	Libya U-23	Indonesia B	1–0	Myanmar
2025	Mali	2–1	Indonesia	Tajikistan		Uzbekistan

== Medals ==
Rank	Nation	Gold	Silver	Bronze	Total
1	Indonesia	3	4	3	10
2	Australia	1	1	1	3
3	Algeria	1	1	0	2
4	Thailand	1	0	2	3
5	Chile	1	0	0	1
5	China	1	0	0	1
5	Malaysia	1	0	0	1
5	Mali	1	0	0	1
9	South Korea	0	2	1	3
10	Iraq	0	1	0	1
10	Libya	0	1	0	1
12	Brazil	0	0	1	1
12	Myanmar	0	0	1	1
12	Tajikistan	0	0	1	1
Totals (14 entries)		10	10	10	30

== Results ==
- List of winners – RSSSF
