= 2018 Persib Bandung season =

Indonesian football club season

Persib Bandung
2018 season
- Owner: PT Persib Bandung Bermartabat
- CEO: Glenn Sugita
- Head coach: Mario Gómez
- Stadium: Gelora Bandung Lautan Api; Batakan Stadium; Kapten I Wayan Dipta Stadium
- Liga 1: 4th
- Piala Indonesia: Ongoing
- Top goalscorer: League: Ezechiel N'Douassel (17); All: Ezechiel N'Douassel (17)
- Highest home attendance: 36,500 vs. Persija Jakarta (23 September 2018)
- Lowest home attendance: 0 vs. Madura United (9 October 2018)
Home colours	Away colours	Third colours

The 2018 season was the 59th season in the history of Persib Bandung, and the club's 22nd consecutive season in the top-flight of Indonesian football since it became fully professional. Along with the domestic league, the club also competed in Piala Indonesia.

== Month by month review ==
=== December 2017 ===
The team has announced Mario Gómez as a new coach. The Argentine coach was appointed to handle Persib in 2018 League 1 season Roberto Carlos Mario Gomez was signed by Persib for two years. Earlier in 2017 Roberto Carlos Mario Gomez was appointed as Malaysian national football team's head coach by FAM president Tunku Ismail Sultan Ibrahim, but he then asked for a higher salary and was therefore rejected as it was expensive.

=== January 2018 ===
Some players were recruited by the coach, including Eka Ramdani, Oh In-kyun, Bojan Malisic, Airlangga Sutjipto, Victor Igbonefo and the coach recruited players from Persib U-19 which is the second winner of League 1 U-19 namely Muhammad Aqil Savik and Indra Mustafa. In spite of all that, Persib must also be left behind the flagship player who is the top scorer of Persib last season, Raphael Maitimo who decided to strengthen the other contestants of League 1, Madura United. Not only that, Persib also left behind importers from Japan Shohei Matsunaga, Jajang Sukmara which strengthens PSMS Medan, duo young players Angga Febryanto and Ahmad Baasith who strengthen different clubs, namely PS Tira Bantul and Persela Lamongan. Meanwhile, the fate of their strikers Sergio van Dijk and Tantan is still waiting for management's decision regarding their contract.

In their preseason event, Persib decided to follow the annual event of the Presidential Cup which they won in 2015 ago. They are in the "hell" group with other big teams, namely PSM Makassar, Sriwijaya F.C and second winner of League 2 PSMS Medan handled by their former coach, Djajang Nurdjaman. Persib Bandung undergo the first fight against Sriwijaya F.C. as well as the opening match of the 2018 Presidential Cup. Despite their dominant defeat of the visitors, they were able to clinch a 1–0 victory over the visitors.

== Coaching staff ==
Position	Name
Manager	(Indonesia) Umuh Muchtar
Head coach	(Argentina) Mario Gómez
Assistant coach	(Argentina) Fernando Soler
Goalkeeping coach	(Indonesia) Anwar Sanusi
Fitness coach	(Indonesia) Yaya Sunarya
Doctor	(Indonesia) Mohammad Rafi Ghani
Physioterapist	(Indonesia) Benidektus Adi Prianto
General Secretary	(Indonesia) Yudiana

== Squad information ==
=== First-team squad ===
No.	Name	Nat.	Date of birth (age)	Signed in	Contract until	Signed from	Transfer Fee	Notes
Goalkeepers
1	Muhammad Natshir	(Indonesia)	13 February 1993 (age 33)	2014	2018	(Indonesia) Arema Cronus	?	
30	Aqil Savik	(Indonesia)	17 January 1999 (age 27)	2018		(Indonesia) Persib Bandung U-19	?	Under-23 Player
78	I Made Wirawan	(Indonesia)	12 January 1981 (age 45)	2013	2018	(Indonesia) Persiba Balikpapan	?	
Defenders
3	Ardi Idrus	(Indonesia)	22 January 1993 (age 33)	2018	2020	(Indonesia) Semen Padang F.C.	?	
4	Bojan Mališić	(Serbia)	14 January 1985 (age 41)	2018	2019	(Philippines) Davao Aguilas F.C.	?	Vice Captain | Foreign player
6	Tony Sucipto	(Indonesia)	12 February 1986 (age 40)	2012	2018	(Indonesia) Persija Jakarta	?	
12	Henhen Herdiana	(Indonesia)	10 September 1995 (age 31)	2017		(Indonesia) Persib Bandung U-21	?	Under-23 Player
16	Indra Mustafa	(Indonesia)	28 June 1999 (age 27)	2018	2019	(Indonesia) Persib Bandung U-19	?	Under-23 Player
21	Mario Jardel	(Indonesia)	7 November 2000 (age 26)	2018		(Indonesia) Persib Bandung U-19	?	Persib Bandung U-19
22	Supardi Nasir	(Indonesia)	9 April 1983 (age 43)	2017		(Indonesia) Sriwijaya F.C.	?	Captain
32	Victor Igbonefo	(Indonesia)	18 November 1988 (age 37)	2018	2020	(Thailand) Nakhon Ratchasima	?	
94	Mochamad Sabillah	(Indonesia)	10 May 1994 (age 32)	2018		(Indonesia) Persibat Batang	?	
Midfielders
7	Atep	(Indonesia)	5 June 1985 (age 41)	2008	2018	(Indonesia) Persija Jakarta	?	
11	Dedi Kusnandar	(Indonesia)	23 July 1991 (age 35)	2017		(Malaysia) Sabah FA	?	
13	Febri Haryadi	(Indonesia)	19 February 1996 (age 30)	2015	2020	(Indonesia) Persib Bandung U-21	?	Under-23 Player
14	Agung Mulyadi	(Indonesia)	23 March 1997 (age 29)	2017		(Indonesia) Diklat Persib	?	Under-23 Player
23	Kim Kurniawan	(Indonesia)	23 March 1990 (age 36)	2016	2021	(Indonesia) Pelita Bandung Raya	?	
24	Hariono	(Indonesia)	2 October 1985 (age 41)	2008	2018	(Indonesia) Deltras Sidoarjo	?	2nd Vice Captain
27	Puja Abdillah	(Indonesia)	27 November 1996 (age 29)	2017		(Indonesia) Persib Bandung U-21	?	Under-23 Player
33	Oh In-kyun	(South Korea)	29 January 1985 (age 41)	2018		(Indonesia) Mitra Kukar F.C.	?	Foreign Player
77	Ghozali Siregar	(Indonesia)	7 July 1992 (age 34)	2018		(Indonesia) PSM Makassar	?	
80	Eka Ramdani	(Indonesia)	18 June 1984 (age 42)	2018	2019	(Indonesia) Persela Lamongan	?	
93	Beckham Putra	(Indonesia)	29 October 2001 (age 25)	2018		(Indonesia) Persib Bandung U-19	?	Persib Bandung U-19
Forwards
9	Airlangga Sutjipto	(Indonesia)	22 November 1985 (age 40)	2018		(Indonesia) Sriwijaya F.C.	?	
10	Ezechiel N'Douassel	(Chad)	22 April 1988 (age 38)	2017	2020	(Israel) Hapoel Tel Aviv	?	Foreign Player
19	Ilham Qolba	(Indonesia)	27 May 1999 (age 27)	2018		(Indonesia) Persib Bandung U-19	?	Persib Bandung U-19
37	Muchlis Hadi	(Indonesia)	26 October 1996 (age 30)	2018		Free Transfer	?	Under-23 Player
88	Patrich Wanggai	(Indonesia)	27 June 1988 (age 38)	July 2018	Januari 2019	(Indonesia) Sriwijaya F.C.	?	
98	Wildan Ramdani	(Indonesia)	24 December 1998 (age 27)	2018	2021	(Indonesia) Persib Bandung U-19	?	Under-23 Player
99	Jonatan Bauman	(Argentina)	30 March 1991 (age 35)	2018		(Greece) PAE Kerkyra	?	Foreign Player

== Pre-season ==
Win Draw Loss

January 2018 1	Persib	4–0	Sleman United	Yogyakarta, Special Region of Yogyakarta
15:00 (UTC+7)	N'Douassel; Jufriyanto			Stadium: UNY Field; Attendance: TBA; Referee: TBA

January 2018 2	PS Batam	1–2	Persib	Batam, Riau Islands
15:00 (UTC+7)	TBD 80'		Oh In-kyun 45+2'; Dedi Kusnandar 70'	Stadium: Temenggung Abdul Razak Stadium

16 January 2018 President's Cup	Persib	1–0	Sriwijaya	Bandung, West Java
15:30 (UTC+7)	Oh In-kyun 55'; Bojan (yellow card); N'Douassel (yellow card); Jufriyanto (yellow card); Essien (yellow card)	Report	Novan (yellow card); Marco Sandy (yellow card); Bio (yellow card); Alfin (yellow card); Hyun-goo (yellow card)	Stadium: Gelora Bandung Lautan Api Stadium; Attendance: 25,747; Referee: Djumadi Effendi

21 January 2018 President's Cup	Persib	0–2	PSMS	Bandung, West Java
19:30 (UTC+7)		Report	Frets 26'; Antony 30'	Stadium: Gelora Bandung Lautan Api Stadium; Attendance: 29,676; Referee: Mustofa Umarella

26 January 2018 President's Cup	Persib	0–1	PSM	Bandung, West Java
19:30 (UTC+7)		Report	Zulkifli (red card) 54'; Djite 58'	Stadium: Gelora Bandung Lautan Api Stadium; Attendance: 23,837; Referee: Handri Kristanto

9 February 2018 3	Persijap	0–2	Persib	Jepara, Central Java
15:00 (UTC+7)			N'Douassel 9' 52'	Stadium: Gelora Bumi Kartini Stadium; Attendance: TBA; Referee: TBA

== Competitions ==
=== Overview ===

Persib XI Go-Jek Liga 1 2018

Competition	Record								Started round	Final position / round	First match	Last match
Competition	G	W	D	L	GF	GA	GD	Win %	Started round	Final position / round	First match	Last match
Liga 1	34	14	10	10	48	41	+7	41.18	Matchday 1	4th	26 March 2018	8 December 2018
Piala Indonesia	2	2	0	0	3	1	+2	100.00	First Round	In Progress	15 August 2018	
Total	36	16	10	10	51	42	+9	44.44				

Updated to match played 4 May 2019
Source: Competitions

=== Liga 1 ===
==== League table ====
Locations of the 2018 Liga 1 teams

Pos	Team	Pld	W	D	L	GF	GA	GD	Pts	Qualification or relegation
2	PSM	34	17	10	7	57	42	+15	61	Qualification for the AFC Cup group stage
3	Bhayangkara (Note: Bhayangkara would have qualified for the AFC Cup group stage had Persija qualified for the AFC Champions League group stage. As Persija failed to qualify for the AFC Champions League group stage, Bhayangkara's qualification in the AFC Cup was annulled.)	34	15	8	11	41	39	+2	53	
4	Persib	34	14	10	10	49	41	+8	52	
5	Persebaya	34	14	8	12	60	48	+12	50 (Note: Head-to-head results: Persebaya 1–0 Arema; Arema 1–0 Persebaya)	
6	Arema	34	14	8	12	53	42	+11	50	

Source: Go-Jek Liga 1, Soccerway
Rules for classification: 1) Points; 2) Head-to-head; 3) Goal difference; 4) Goals scored; 5) Drawing.

==== Results summary ====
Overall								Home						Away					
Pld	W	D	L	GF	GA	GD	Pts	W	D	L	GF	GA	GD	W	D	L	GF	GA	GD
34	14	10	10	48	40	+8	52	9	4	4	28	18	+10	5	6	6	20	22	−2

Last updated: 19 November 2018.
Source: Soccerway

==== Results by matchday ====
Matchday	1	2	3	4	5	6	7	8	9	10	11	12	13	14	15	16	17	18	19	20	21	22	23	24	25	26	27	28	29	30	31	32	33	34
Ground	H	A	H	A	H	A	H	H	A	H	A	A	H	A	H	A	A	A	H	A	H	A	H	H	A	H	A	H	A	H	A	H	A	H
Result	D	L	W	D	W	L	W	W	D	L	W	L	W	D	W	D	W	W	W	L	W	W	W	L	D	L	L	D	W	L	L	D	D	D
Position	8	15	8	11	7	12	7	6	7	11	8	9	7	9	4	5	1	1	1	1	1	1	1	1	1	2	3	3	2	3	3	3	3	4

Updated to match(es) played on 19 November 2018. Source: Matches
A = Away; H = Home; W = Win; D = Draw; L = Loss

==== Matches ====
Win Draw Loss

First round

26 March 2018 1	Persib	1-1	PS TIRA	Bandung, West Java
16:00 (UTC+7)	N'Douassel 31'	Report	Rakić 90+5'	Stadium: Gelora Bandung Lautan Api Stadium; Attendance: 9,787; Referee: Mustofa Umarella

1 April 2018 2	Sriwijaya	3-1	Persib	Palembang, South Sumatera
18:30 (UTC+7)	Vizcarra 47'; Marckho 49'; Dzhalilov 66'	Report	N'Douassel 28'	Stadium: Gelora Sriwijaya Stadium; Attendance: 20,712; Referee: Abdul Rahman Salasa

8 April 2018 3	Persib	2-0	Mitra Kukar	Bandung, West Java
18:30 (UTC+7)	Bauman 53'; Oh In-kyun 61'	Report		Stadium: Gelora Bandung Lautan Api Stadium; Attendance: 32,715; Referee: Dwi Purba

15 April 2018 4	Arema	2-2	Persib	Malang, East Java
18:30 (UTC+7)	Furtuoso 19'; Balša 87'	Report	N'Douassel 20', 77'	Stadium: Kanjuruhan Stadium; Attendance: 31,000; Referee: Handri Kristanto

21 April 2018 5	Persib	3-1	Borneo	Bandung, West Java
18:30 (UTC+7)	N'Douassel 9', 68'; Bauman 79'	Report	Bonai 77'	Stadium: Gelora Bandung Lautan Api Stadium; Attendance: 30,279; Referee: Prasetyo Hadi

28 April 2018 6	Persija	P–P	Persib	Central Jakarta, DKI Jakarta (Note: Persija Jakarta hosted Persib Bandung at PTIK Stadium on 30 June. Because it did not get the police permit.)
18:30 UTC+7				Stadium: Gelora Bung Karno Stadium

4 May 2018 7	Madura United	2-1	Persib	Pamekasan, East Java
15:30 (UTC+7)	Beltrame 38' (pen.), 81'	Report	Bauman 90'	Stadium: Gelora Ratu Pamelingan Stadium; Attendance: 9,268; Referee: Agus Fauzan

12 May 2018 8	Persib	2-0	Persipura	Bandung, West Java
18:30 (UTC+7)	N'Douassel 28' (pen.); Bauman 65'	Report		Stadium: Gelora Bandung Lautan Api Stadium; Attendance: 32,175; Referee: Nusur Fadilah

26 July 2018 9	Persebaya	P–P	Persib	Surabaya, East Java (Note: Persebaya Surabaya hosted Persib Bandung at Gelora Bung Tomo Stadium on 26 July. Because it did not get the police permit.Due to the incompetence of Surabaya situation after the terror bomb.)
18:30 (UTC+7)				Stadium: Gelora Bung Tomo Stadium

23 May 2018 10	Persib	3-0	PSM	Bandung, West Java
20:30 (UTC+7)	N'Douassel 39' (pen.), 54'; Bauman 82'	Report		Stadium: Gelora Bandung Lautan Api Stadium; Attendance: 9,729; Referee: Agus Fauzan

27 May 2018 11	Bali United	0-0	Persib	Gianyar, Bali
20:30 (UTC+7)		Report		Stadium: Kapten I Wayan Dipta Stadium; Attendance: 18,744; Referee: Dwi Purba

31 May 2018 12	Persib	0-1	Bhayangkara	Bandung, West Java
20:30 (UTC+7)		Report	Bauman 55' (og.)	Stadium: Gelora Bandung Lautan Api Stadium; Attendance: 11,271; Referee: Adi Riyanto

5 June 2018 13	PSMS	0-3	Persib	Medan, North Sumatera
20:30 (UTC+7)		Report	N'Douassel 22', 81'; Oh In-kyun 38'	Stadium: Teladan Stadium; Attendance: 20,000; Referee: Fariq Hitaba

30 June 2018 6 (postponed match)	Persija	1-0	Persib	South Jakarta, DKI Jakarta
18:30 UTC+7	Jaimerson 15'	Report		Stadium: PTIK Stadium; Attendance: 670; Referee: Faulur Rosy

8 July 2018 14	Persib	1-0	PSIS	Bandung, West Java
18:30 (UTC+7)	N'Douassel 40'	Report		Stadium: Gelora Bandung Lautan Api Stadium; Attendance: 34,989; Referee: Djumadi Effendi

12 July 2018 15	Perseru	0-0	Persib	Yapen Islands Regency, Papua
13:30 (UTC+7)		Report		Stadium: Marora Stadium; Attendance: 836; Referee: Yeni Krisdianto

16 July 2018 16	Persib	1-0	Persela	Bandung, West Java
18:30 (UTC+7)	Bauman 28'	Report		Stadium: Gelora Bandung Lautan Api Stadium; Attendance: 9,972; Referee: Suhardiyanto

22 July 2018 17	Barito Putera	2-2	Persib	Banjarmasin, South Kalimantan
18:30 (UTC+7)	Evans 45+2'; Ady 89'	Report	Oh In-kyun 42'; N'Douassel 80'	Stadium: 17 May Stadium; Attendance: 9,017; Referee: Handri Kristanto

26 July 2018 9 (postponed match)	Persebaya	3-4	Persib	Surabaya, East Java
18:30 (UTC+7)	Kayame 57'; Fandi 64'; da Silva 88'	Report	Supardi 5', 22'; Ghozali 53', 81'	Stadium: Gelora Bung Tomo Stadium; Attendance: 50,000; Referee: Aprisman Aranda

Second round

30 July 2018 18	PS TIRA	2-3	Persib	Bantul, Special Region of Yogyakarta
18:30 (UTC+7)	Natshir 43' (og.); Manahati 90' (pen.)	Report	Wanggai 45+2', 83'; Bauman 90+5' (pen.)	Stadium: Sultan Agung Stadium; Attendance: 6,924; Referee: Djumadi Effendi

4 August 2018 19	Persib	2-0	Sriwijaya	Bandung, West Java
16:00 (UTC+7)	Bauman 16'; Wanggai 29'	Report		Stadium: Gelora Bandung Lautan Api Stadium; Attendance: 31,155; Referee: Totok Fitrianto

10 August 2018 20	Mitra Kukar	1-0	Persib	Tenggarong, East Kalimantan
15:30 (UTC+7)	Pradana 87'	Report		Stadium: Aji Imbut Stadium; Attendance: 2,846; Referee: Iwan Sukoco

13 September 2018 21	Persib	2-0	Arema	Bandung, West Java
16:00 (UTC+7)	Atep 42'; Mališić 64'	Report		Stadium: Gelora Bandung Lautan Api Stadium; Attendance: 33,719; Referee: Aprisman Aranda

17 September 2018 22	Borneo	0-1	Persib	Balikpapan, East Kalimantan
18.30 (UTC+7)		Report	Ghozali 82'	Stadium: Batakan Stadium; Attendance: 2,135; Referee: Adi Riyanto

23 September 2018 23	Persib	3-2	Persija	Bandung, West Java
16.00 (UTC+7)	N'Douassel 28'; Bauman 60' (pen.); Mališić 90+4'	Report	Jaimerson 45+4'; Rohit 65'	Stadium: Gelora Bandung Lautan Api Stadium; Attendance: 36,500; Referee: Yeni Krisdianto

9 October 2018 24	Persib	1-2	Madura United	Balikpapan, East Kalimantan (Note: The PSSI Disciplinary Committee decided to give a punishment to Persib Bandung in the form of sanctions for home matches outside Java without spectators until the end of the 2018 season and half of the 2019 season.)
18.30 (UTC+7)	Muchlis 48'	Report	Beltrame 27' (pen.); Zah Rahan 58'	Stadium: Batakan Stadium; Attendance: 0 Referee: Suhardiyanto

15 October 2018 25	Persipura	1-1	Persib	Jayapura, Papua
13.30 (UTC+7)	Hilton 52'	Report	Ghozali 68'	Stadium: Mandala Stadium; Attendance: 11,131; Referee: Tabrani

20 October 2018 26	Persib	1-4	Persebaya	Gianyar, Bali
18.30 (UTC+7)	Febri 19'	Report	Irfan 17' (pen.); Fandi 42', 77'; Osvaldo 80'	Stadium: Kapten I Wayan Dipta Stadium; Attendance: 0 Referee: Adi Riyanto

24 October 2018 27	PSM	1-0	Persib	Makassar, South Sulawesi
15.30 (UTC+7)	Guy 81'	Report		Stadium: Andi Mattalatta Stadium; Attendance: 14,858; Referee: Tabrani

30 October 2018 28	Persib	1-1	Bali United	Balikpapan, East Kalimantan
18.30 (UTC+7)	Supardi 33'	Report	Lilipaly 22'	Stadium: Batakan Stadium; Attendance: 0 Referee: Dwi Purba

3 November 2018 29	Bhayangkara	1-2	Persib	South Jakarta, DKI Jakarta
16.00 (UTC+7)	Dzumafo 88'	Report	N'Douassel 5'; Bauman 17'	Stadium: PTIK Stadium; Attendance: 1,488; Referee: Aprisman Aranda

11 November 2018 30	Persib	0-1	PSMS	Gianyar, Bali
15.30 (UTC+7)		Report	Martins 52'	Stadium: Kapten I Wayan Dipta Stadium; Attendance: 0 Referee: Suhardiyanto

18 November 2018 31	PSIS	3-0	Persib	Magelang, Central Java
15.30 (UTC+7)	Bruno 17'; Hari Nur 68'; Conteh 75'	Report		Stadium: Moch. Soebroto Stadium; Attendance: 19,695; Referee: Rully Ruslin Tambuntina

23 November 2018 32	Persib	2-2	Perseru	Gianyar, Bali
15.30 (UTC+7)	Wanggai 6'; Bauman 51'	Report	Alberto 83' (pen.); Saimima 90+3'	Stadium: Kapten I Wayan Dipta Stadium; Attendance: 0 Referee: Hamim Tohari

1 December 2018 33	Persela	1-1	Persib	Lamongan, East Java
15.30 (UTC+7)	Wallace 35' (pen.)	Report	N'Douassel 56' (pen.)	Stadium: Surajaya Stadium; Attendance: 14,200; Referee: Ikhsan Prasetya Jati

8 December 2018 34	Persib	3-3	Barito Putera	Gianyar, Bali
18.30 (UTC+7)	Ghozali 20'; Bauman 23'; N'Douassel 43'	Report	Pora 18'; Samsul 25', 87'	Stadium: Kapten I Wayan Dipta Stadium; Attendance: 0 Referee: Dwi Purba

=== Piala Indonesia ===
==== Matches ====
Win Draw Loss

First round

15 August 2018 Zone 6	PSKC (3)	1-2	Persib (1)	Tasikmalaya, West Java (Note: This match was originally scheduled on 4 July 2018 but the police did not give permission for the match to be held on that day because it coincides with KPU agenda of plenary meeting on vote election result of West Java Election.)
14:45 (UTC+7)	Rodliyan 10'	Report	Airlangga 35'; Atep 66'	Stadium: Wiradadaha Stadium

Second round

5 December 2018 Zone 3	PSCS (3)	0-1	Persib (1)	Cilacap, Central Java
15:00		Report	Febri 49'	Stadium: Wijayakusuma Stadium; Referee: Fariq Hitaba

== Statistics ==
=== Squad appearances and goals ===
Last updated on 14 November 2018.

No.	Pos	Nat	Player	Total		Liga 1		Piala Indonesia	
No.	Pos	Nat	Player	Apps	Goals	Apps	Goals	Apps	Goals
Goalkeepers
1	GK	(Indonesia) IDN	Muhammad Natshir	25	0	25	0	0	0
30	GK	(Indonesia) IDN	Aqil Savik	0	0	0	0	0	0
78	GK	(Indonesia) IDN	I Made Wirawan	6	0	5	0	1	0
Defenders
3	DF	(Indonesia) IDN	Ardi Idrus	26	0	26	0	0	0
4	DF	(Serbia) SRB	Bojan Mališić	23	2	23	2	0	0
6	DF	(Indonesia) IDN	Tony Sucipto	17	0	11+5	0	1	0
12	DF	(Indonesia) IDN	Henhen Herdiana	11	0	8+2	0	1	0
16	DF	(Indonesia) IDN	Indra Mustafa	8	0	5+3	0	0	0
21	DF	(Indonesia) IDN	Mario Jardel	0	0	0	0	0	0
22	DF	(Indonesia) IDN	Supardi Nasir	25	3	25	3	0	0
32	DF	(Indonesia) IDN	Victor Igbonefo	23	0	23	0	0	0
94	DF	(Indonesia) IDN	Mochamad Sabillah	10	0	6+3	0	1	0
Midfielders
7	MF	(Indonesia) IDN	Atep	15	2	6+8	1	1	1
11	MF	(Indonesia) IDN	Dedi Kusnandar	23	0	23	0	0	0
13	MF	(Indonesia) IDN	Febri Haryadi	16	1	16	1	0	0
14	MF	(Indonesia) IDN	Agung Mulyadi	12	0	7+4	0	1	0
23	MF	(Indonesia) IDN	Kim Kurniawan	5	0	3+1	0	0+1	0
24	MF	(Indonesia) IDN	Hariono	19	0	10+9	0	0	0
27	MF	(Indonesia) IDN	Puja Abdillah	3	0	1+1	0	1	0
33	MF	(South Korea) KOR	Oh In-kyun	24	3	24	3	0	0
77	MF	(Indonesia) IDN	Ghozali Siregar	28	4	26+2	4	0	0
80	MF	(Indonesia) IDN	Eka Ramdani	14	0	3+10	0	1	0
93	MF	(Indonesia) IDN	Beckham Putra	1	0	0	0	0+1	0
Forwards
9	FW	(Indonesia) IDN	Airlangga Sutjipto	7	1	2+4	0	1	1
10	FW	(Chad) CHA	Ezechiel N'Douassel	19	15	19	15	0	0
19	FW	(Indonesia) IDN	Ilham Qolba	1	0	0	0	0+1	0
37	FW	(Indonesia) IDN	Muchlis Hadi	7	1	2+4	1	1	0
88	FW	(Indonesia) IDN	Patrich Wanggai	10	3	7+3	3	0	0
98	FW	(Indonesia) IDN	Wildan Ramdani	4	0	0+3	0	1	0
99	FW	(Argentina) ARG	Jonatan Bauman	22	10	21+1	10	0	0
Players who have made an appearance or had a squad number this season but have left the club
20	MF	(Indonesia) IDN	Billy Keraf	2	0	1+1	0	0	0
2	DF	(Indonesia) IDN	Wildansyah	3	0	3	0	0	0
8	MF	(Indonesia) IDN	Gian Zola	2	0	0+2	0	0	0
89	GK	(Indonesia) IDN	Imam Arief Fadillah	0	0	0	0	0	0

Last updated: 14 November 2018.
Source: Soccerway

=== Top scorers ===
The list is sorted by shirt number when total goals are equal.

Rnk	Pos	No.	Player	Liga 1	Piala Indonesia	Total
1	CF	10	(Chad) Ezechiel N'Douassel	15	0	15
2	CF	99	(Argentina) Jonatan Bauman	10	0	10
3	MF	77	(Indonesia) Ghozali Siregar	4	0	4
4	AM	33	(South Korea) Oh In-kyun	3	0	3
4	FW	88	(Indonesia) Patrich Wanggai	3	0	3
4	DF	22	(Indonesia) Supardi Nasir	3	0	3
7	DF	4	(Serbia) Bojan Mališić	2	0	2
7	MF	7	(Indonesia) Atep	1	1	2
9	FW	37	(Indonesia) Muchlis Hadi	1	0	1
9	MF	13	(Indonesia) Febri Haryadi	1	0	1
9	FW	9	(Indonesia) Airlangga Sutjipto	0	1	1
Own goals				2	0	2
Total				43	2	45

Last updated: 4 November 2018.
Source: Soccerway

=== Clean Sheets ===
The list is sorted by shirt number when total clean sheets are equal.

Rnk	Pos	No.	Player	Liga 1	Piala Indonesia	Total
1	GK	1	(Indonesia) Muhammad Natshir	10	0	10
2	GK	78	(Indonesia) I Made Wirawan	1	0	1
Total				11	0	11

Last updated: 17 September 2018.
Source: Soccerway

=== Disciplinary record ===
Includes all competitive matches. Players listed below made at least one appearance for Persib Bandung first squad during the season.

Rnk	No.	Pos.	Nat.	Name	Liga 1			Piala Indonesia			Total			Notes
Rnk	No.	Pos.	Nat.	Name	Yellow card	Second yellow card	Red card	Yellow card	Second yellow card	Red card	Yellow card	Second yellow card	Red card	Notes
1	99	FW	(Argentina)	Jonatan Bauman	8	1	0	0	0	0	8	1	0	
2	33	MF	(South Korea)	Oh In-kyun	7	1	0	0	0	0	7	1	0	
3	10	FW	(Chad)	Ezechiel N'Douassel	6	0	0	0	0	0	6	0	0	
4	22	DF	(Indonesia)	Supardi Nasir	4	0	0	0	0	0	4	0	0	
4	4	DF	(Serbia)	Bojan Mališić	4	0	0	0	0	0	4	0	0	
4	1	GK	(Indonesia)	Muhammad Natshir	4	0	0	0	0	0	4	0	0	
4	3	DF	(Indonesia)	Ardi Idrus	4	0	0	0	0	0	4	0	0	
4	77	MF	(Indonesia)	Ghozali Siregar	4	0	0	0	0	0	4	0	0	
9	11	MF	(Indonesia)	Dedi Kusnandar	3	0	0	0	0	0	3	0	0	
9	14	MF	(Indonesia)	Agung Mulyadi	3	0	0	0	0	0	3	0	0	
9	94	DF	(Indonesia)	Mochamad Sabillah	2	0	0	1	0	0	3	0	0	
9	80	MF	(Indonesia)	Eka Ramdani	2	0	0	1	0	0	3	0	0	
13	24	MF	(Indonesia)	Hariono	2	0	0	0	0	0	2	0	0	
13	13	MF	(Indonesia)	Febri Haryadi	2	0	0	0	0	0	2	0	0	
13	88	FW	(Indonesia)	Patrich Wanggai	2	0	0	0	0	0	2	0	0	
13	78	GK	(Indonesia)	I Made Wirawan	2	0	0	0	0	0	2	0	0	
13	6	DF	(Indonesia)	Tony Sucipto	2	0	0	0	0	0	2	0	0	
18	16	DF	(Indonesia)	Indra Mustafa	1	0	0	0	0	0	1	0	0	
18	9	FW	(Indonesia)	Airlangga Sutjipto	1	0	0	0	0	0	1	0	0	

Last updated: 14 November 2018
Source: Soccerway Only competitive matches
(yellow card) = Number of bookings; (second yellow card) = Number of sending offs after a second yellow card; (red card) = Number of sending offs by a direct red card.

== New contracts ==
=== Promotion from Persib Bandung U-19 ===
No.	Pos	Player	Transferred From	Fee	Date	Source
30	GK	(Indonesia) Aqil Savik	(Indonesia) Persib Bandung U-19		3 January 2018	
16	DF	(Indonesia) Indra Mustafa	(Indonesia) Persib Bandung U-19		3 January 2018	
98	FW	(Indonesia) Wildan Ramdani	(Indonesia) Persib Bandung U-19		13 July 2018	
21	DF	(Indonesia) Mario Jardel	(Indonesia) Persib Bandung U-19		14 August 2018	
93	MF	(Indonesia) Beckham Putra	(Indonesia) Persib Bandung U-19		14 August 2018	
19	FW	(Indonesia) Ilham Qolba	(Indonesia) Persib Bandung U-19		14 August 2018	

=== In ===
No.	Pos	Player	Transferred From	Fee	Date	Source
33	MF	(South Korea) Oh In-kyun	(Indonesia) Mitra Kukar		3 January 2018	
32	DF	(Indonesia) Victor Igbonefo	(Thailand) Nakhon Ratchasima F.C.		3 January 2018	
4	DF	(Serbia) Bojan Mališić	(Philippines) Davao Aguilas F.C.		3 January 2018	
80	MF	(Indonesia) Eka Ramdani	(Indonesia) Persela Lamongan		3 January 2018	
9	FW	(Indonesia) Airlangga Sutjipto	(Indonesia) Sriwijaya F.C.		3 January 2018	
37	FW	(Indonesia) Muchlis Hadi	Free Transfer		2 February 2018	
77	MF	(Indonesia) Ghozali Siregar	(Indonesia) PSM Makassar		2 February 2018	
99	FW	(Argentina) Jonatan Bauman	(Greece) PAE Kerkyra		17 March 2018	
94	DF	(Indonesia) Mochamad Sabillah	(Indonesia) Persibat Batang		22 March 2018	
3	DF	(Indonesia) Ardi Idrus	(Indonesia) Semen Padang F.C.		29 March 2018	
88	FW	(Indonesia) Patrich Wanggai	(Indonesia) Sriwijaya F.C.		14 July 2018	

=== Out ===
No.	Pos	Player	Transferred To	Fee	Date	Source
3	DF	(Montenegro) Vladimir Vujović	(Indonesia) Bhayangkara F.C.		January 2018	
10	MF	(Indonesia) Raphael Maitimo	(Indonesia) Madura United F.C.		January 2018	
17	FW	(Japan) Shohei Matsunaga	Free Transfer		January 2018	
15	FW	(Indonesia) Angga Febryanto	(Indonesia) PS TNI		January 2018	
19	MF	(Indonesia) Ahmad Baasith	(Indonesia) Persela Lamongan		January 2018	
18	MF	(Indonesia) Jajang Sukmara	(Indonesia) PSMS Medan		January 2018	
16	DF	(Indonesia) Achmad Jufriyanto	(Malaysia) Kuala Lumpur F.A.		January 2018	
9	FW	(Indonesia) Sergio van Dijk	(Netherlands) VV Pelikaan-S		February 2018	
82	FW	(Indonesia) Tantan	Retired		February 2018	

=== Loan Out ===
No.	Pos	Player	Loaned to	Start	End	Source
31	MF	(Indonesia) Agung Pribadi	(Indonesia) Persela	2017		
2	DF	(Indonesia) Wildansyah	(Indonesia) Borneo	July 2018		
20	MF	(Indonesia) Billy Keraf	(Indonesia) Borneo	July 2018		
8	MF	(Indonesia) Gian Zola	(Indonesia) Persela	July 2018		
89	GK	(Indonesia) Imam Arief Fadillah	(Indonesia) PSM Makasar	July 2018		
