= 2019 Persib Bandung season =

Indonesian football club season

Persib Bandung
2019 season
- Owner: PT. Persib Bandung Bermartabat
- CEO: Glenn Sugita
- Head coach: Miljan Radović (until 3 May 2019); Robert Alberts (from 3 May 2019)
- Stadium: Si Jalak Harupat Stadium
- Liga 1: 6th
- Piala Indonesia (Note: Piala Indonesia results in this season page is only for competition progress from the round of 32 onwards. Statistics for the first two rounds which were played last year, were put into the 2018 season.): Quarter-finals
- Top goalscorer: League: Ezechiel N'Douassel (15); All: Ezechiel N'Douassel (21)
Home colours	Away colours	Third colours

The 2019 season was the 60th season in the history of Persib Bandung, and the club's 23rd consecutive season in the top-flight of Indonesian football since it became fully professional. In addition to the domestic league, Persib resumed their participation in Piala Indonesia after winning through the first two rounds in 2018.

A season of mixed form saw Persib finish sixth in Liga 1 while the club's cup run ended in the quarter-finals on away goals to Borneo.

== Coaching staff ==
Position	Name
Manager	(Indonesia) Umuh Muchtar
Head coach	(Netherlands) Robert Alberts
Assistant coach	(Indonesia) Budiman Yunus
Goalkeeping coach	(Indonesia) Gatot Prasetyo
Fitness coach	(Indonesia) Yaya Sunarya
Doctor	(Indonesia) Mohammad Raffi Ghani
Physioterapist	(Indonesia) Benidektus Adi Prianto
General secretary	(Indonesia) Yudiana

== Players ==
=== Squad information ===
No.	Name	Nat.	Date of birth (age)	Signed in	Contract until	Signed from	Notes
Goalkeepers
1	Muhammad Natshir	(Indonesia)	13 February 1993 (age 26)	2014		(Indonesia) Arema Cronus	
30	Aqil Savik	(Indonesia)	17 January 1999 (age 20)	2018		(Indonesia) Persib Bandung U-19	Under-23 player
78	I Made Wirawan	(Indonesia)	12 January 1981 (age 38)	2013		(Indonesia) Persiba Balikpapan	
81	Dhika Bayangkara	(Indonesia)	29 April 1992 (age 27)	2019		(Indonesia) PSS Sleman	
Defenders
2	Nick Kuipers	(Netherlands)	8 October 1992 (age 27)	2019	2020	(Netherlands) ADO Den Haag	Foreign player
3	Ardi Idrus	(Indonesia)	22 January 1993 (age 26)	2018	2020	(Indonesia) Semen Padang	
12	Henhen Herdiana	(Indonesia)	10 September 1995 (age 23)	2017		(Indonesia) Persib Bandung U-21	Under-23 player
15	Fabiano Beltrame	(Indonesia) (Brazil)	29 August 1982 (age 37)	2019	2020	(Indonesia) Madura United	
16	Achmad Jufriyanto	(Indonesia)	7 February 1987 (age 32)	2019	2021	(Malaysia) Kuala Lumpur	
17	Zalnando	(Indonesia)	25 December 1996 (age 23)	2019		(Indonesia) Sriwijaya	Under-23 player
19	Indra Mustafa	(Indonesia)	28 June 1999 (age 20)	2018	2019	(Indonesia) Persib Bandung	Under-23 player
22	Supardi Nasir	(Indonesia)	9 April 1983 (age 36)	2017		(Indonesia) Sriwijaya	Captain
Midfielders
7	Beckham Putra	(Indonesia)	29 October 2001 (age 18)	2018		(Indonesia) Persib Bandung U-19	Under-23 player
8	Abdul Aziz	(Indonesia)	14 February 1994 (age 25)	2019		(Indonesia) PSMS Medan	
11	Dedi Kusnandar	(Indonesia)	23 July 1991 (age 28)	2017		(Malaysia) Sabah	
13	Febri Haryadi	(Indonesia)	19 February 1996 (age 23)	2015	2020	(Indonesia) Persib Bandung U-21	Under-23 player
18	Gian Zola	(Indonesia)	5 August 1998 (age 21)	2015	2020	(Indonesia) Persib Bandung U-21	Under-23 player
23	Kim Kurniawan	(Indonesia) (Germany)	23 March 1990 (age 29)	2016	2021	(Indonesia) Pelita Bandung Raya	
24	Hariono	(Indonesia)	2 October 1985 (age 34)	2008	2018	(Indonesia) Deltras Sidoarjo	Vice-captain
77	Ghozali Siregar	(Indonesia)	7 July 1992 (age 27)	2018		(Indonesia) PSM Makassar	
91	Omid Nazari	(Philippines)	29 April 1991 (age 28)	2019		(Philippines) Ceres-Negros	Foreign player
93	Erwin Ramdani	(Indonesia)	11 March 1993 (age 26)	2019		(Indonesia) PSMS Medan	
Forwards
9	Esteban Vizcarra	(Indonesia) (Argentina)	11 April 1986 (age 33)	2019		(Indonesia) Sriwijaya	
10	Ezechiel N'Douassel	(Chad)	22 April 1988 (age 31)	2017	2020	(Israel) Hapoel Tel Aviv	Foreign player
20	Kevin van Kippersluis	(Netherlands)	30 June 1993 (age 26)	2019		(Netherlands) SC Cambuur	Foreign player
21	Frets Butuan	(Indonesia)	4 June 1996 (age 23)	2019		(Indonesia) PSMS Medan	Under-23 player

=== Transfers ===
==== In ====
No.	Pos	Player	Transferred from	Fee	Date	Source
21	RW	(Indonesia) Frets Butuan	(Indonesia) PSMS Medan	Free	14 January 2019	
93	AM	(Indonesia) Erwin Ramdani	(Indonesia) PSMS Medan	Free		
8	CM	(Indonesia) Abdul Aziz	(Indonesia) PSMS Medan	Free		
17	LB	(Indonesia) Zalnando	(Indonesia) Sriwijaya	Free		
9	LW	(Indonesia) Esteban Vizcarra	(Indonesia) Sriwijaya	Free		
15	CB	(Indonesia) Fabiano Beltrame	(Indonesia) Madura United	Free		
6	CB	(Indonesia) Saepulloh Maulana	(Indonesia) Mitra Kukar	Free		
16	CB	(Indonesia) Achmad Jufriyanto	(Malaysia) Kuala Lumpur	Free	18 April 2019	
71	FW	(Turkmenistan) Artur Gevorkyan	(Uzbekistan) Qizilqum Zarafshon	Free	18 April 2019	
82	MF	(Slovenia) Rene Mihelič	(India) Delhi Dynamos	Free	7 May 2019	
91	CM	(Philippines) Omid Nazari	(Philippines) Ceres–Negros	Free	15 August 2019	
20	AM	(Netherlands) Kevin van Kippersluis	(Netherlands) SC Cambuur	Free	15 August 2019	
2	CB	(Netherlands) Nick Kuipers	(Netherlands) ADO Den Haag	Free	15 August 2019	
81	GK	(Indonesia) Dhika Bayangkara	(Indonesia) PSS Sleman	Free	27 August 2019	

==== Out ====
No.	Pos	Player	Transferred to	Fee	Date	Source
33	WF	(South Korea) Oh In-kyun	(Indonesia) Persipura Jayapura	End of contract	1 January 2019	
55	AM	(Montenegro) Srđan Lopičić	Free transfer	Released	23 April 2019	
82	MF	(Slovenia) Rene Mihelič	Free transfer	Released	15 August 2019	
71	FW	(Turkmenistan) Artur Gevorkyan	Free transfer	Released	15 August 2019	
6	CB	(Indonesia) Saepulloh Maulana	Free transfer	Released	27 August 2019	
4	CB	(Serbia) Bojan Mališić	Free transfer	Released	30 August 2019	
7	LM	(Indonesia) Atep Rizal	Free transfer	End of contract		
6	LB	(Indonesia) Tony Sucipto	(Indonesia) Persija Jakarta	Free		
99	FW	(Argentina) Jonatan Bauman	(Malaysia) Kedah	Free		
80	MF	(Indonesia) Eka Ramdani	Retired			
32	CB	(Indonesia) Victor Igbonefo	(Thailand) PTT Rayong	Free		
9	FW	(Indonesia) Airlangga Sucipto	(Indonesia) Sriwijaya	Free		
88	FW	(Indonesia) Patrich Wanggai	(Indonesia) Kalteng Putra	Free		

==== Loan out ====
No.	Pos	Player	Loaned to	Start	End	Source
29	FW	(Indonesia) Billy Keraf	(Indonesia) Badak Lampung	11 May 2019	31 December 2019	
94	CB	(Indonesia) Mochamad Sabillah	(Indonesia) Badak Lampung	11 May 2019	31 December 2019	
27	LW	(Indonesia) Puja Abdillah	(Indonesia) Bandung United	22 August 2019	31 December 2019	
37	FW	(Indonesia) Muchlis Hadi	(Indonesia) Bandung United	22 August 2019	31 December 2019	
14	RM	(Indonesia) Agung Mulyadi	(Indonesia) Bandung United	27 August 2019	31 December 2019	
98	FW	(Indonesia) Wildan Ramdani	(Indonesia) Bandung United	27 August 2019	31 December 2019	

== Pre-season and friendlies ==
=== Indonesia President's Cup ===
==== Group A ====
Pos	Team	Pld	W	D	L	GF	GA	GD	Pts	Qualification
1	Persebaya	3	2	1	0	6	4	+2	7 (Note: Head-to-head points: Persebaya 1, TIRA-Persikabo 1)	Knockout stage
2	TIRA-Persikabo	3	2	1	0	5	3	+2	7	Knockout stage
3	Persib (H)	3	1	0	2	7	5	+2	3	
4	Perseru	3	0	0	3	4	10	−6	0	

Source: Piala Presiden
Rules for classification: 1) Points; 2) Head-to-head; 3) Goal difference; 4) Goal scored.
(H) Hosts
Notes:

2 March 2019 1	Persib	1–2	TIRA-Persikabo	Soreang, Bandung, West Java
16:00 (UTC+7)	Kim 49'	Report	Osas 29', 70'	Stadium: Si Jalak Harupat Stadium; Attendance: 26,541; Referee: Dwi Purba

7 March 2019 2	Persebaya	3–2	Persib	Soreang, Bandung, West Java
15:30 (UTC+7)	Dzhalilov 37', 50'; Irfan 77'	Report	Erwin 32'; Frets 86'	Stadium: Si Jalak Harupat Stadium; Attendance: 26,978; Referee: Nusur Fadillah

12 March 2019 3	Persib	4–0	Perseru	Soreang, Bandung, West Java
18:30 (UTC+7)	Erwin 54'; N'Douassel 69' (pen.); Henhen 85'; Frets 90+3'	Report		Stadium: Si Jalak Harupat Stadium; Attendance: 2,516; Referee: Rully Ruslin Tambuntina

== Competitions ==
=== Overview ===
Competition	Record								Started round	Final position / round	First match	Last match
Competition	G	W	D	L	GF	GA	GD	Win %	Started round	Final position / round	First match	Last match
Liga 1	34	13	12	9	49	39	+10	38.24	Matchday 1	6th	18 May 2019	22 December 2019
Piala Indonesia	6	2	3	1	14	7	+7	33.33	Round of 32	Quarter-finals	27 January 2019	4 May 2019
Total	40	15	15	10	63	46	+17	37.50				

Updated to match played 22 December 2019
Source: Competitions

=== Liga 1 ===
==== League table ====
Locations of the 2019 Liga 1 teams

Pos	Team	Pld	W	D	L	GF	GA	GD	Pts
4	Bhayangkara	34	14	11	9	51	43	+8	53 (Note: Head-to-head points: Persipura (+2) 9 pts; Bhayangkara (+2) 7 pts; Madura United (–4) 1 pts.)
5	Madura United	34	15	8	11	55	44	+11	53
6	Persib	34	13	12	9	49	39	+10	51 (Note: Head-to-head results: Persib 2–2 Borneo; Borneo 0–1 Persib.)
7	Borneo	34	12	15	7	55	42	+13	51
8	PSS	34	12	12	10	45	42	+3	48

Source: Shopee Liga 1 2019, Soccerway
Rules for classification: 1) Points; 2) Head-to-head; 3) Goal difference; 4) Goals scored; 5) Drawing.

==== Results summary ====
Overall								Home						Away					
Pld	W	D	L	GF	GA	GD	Pts	W	D	L	GF	GA	GD	W	D	L	GF	GA	GD
34	13	12	9	49	39	+10	51	9	5	3	32	15	+17	4	7	6	17	24	−7

Last updated: 22 December 2019.
Source: Soccerway

==== Results by matchday ====
Matchday	1	2	3	4	5	6	7	8	9	10	11	12	13	14	15	16	17	18	19	20	21	22	23	24	25	26	27	28	29	30	31	32	33	34
Ground	H	A	H	H	H	A	A	H	A	H	A	A	A	H	A	A	H	A	H	A	A	H	A	H	A	H	H	H	A	H	A	A	H	H
Result	W	D	D	D	L	L	D	W	W	L	L	L	D	D	L	D	W	D	D	W	L	W	D	W	W	W	W	D	L	L	D	W	W	W
Position	2	5	4	6	10	13	13	13	11	9	11	11	9	11	11	12	10	10	11	10	11	11	11	11	8	8	6	7	8	10	10	7	7	6

Source: Matches
A = Away; H = Home; W = Win; D = Draw; L = Loss

==== Matches ====
Win Draw Loss

18 May 2019 1	Persib	3–0	Persipura	Soreang, Bandung, West Java
20:30 (UTC+7)	Mališić (yellow card) 37'; Geworkýan 45+1', 63', (yellow card) 59'; N'Douassel (yellow card) 54'; Febri 67'	Report	Telaubun (yellow card) 12'; Wanewar (yellow card) 69'	Stadium: Si Jalak Harupat Stadium; Attendance: 14,180; Referee: Dwi Susilo

29 May 2019 2	Semen Padang	0–0	Persib	Padang, West Sumatra
21:00 (UTC+7)	Agung (yellow card) 52'; Dedi (yellow card) 65'; Irsyad (yellow card) 69'	Report	Jufriyanto (yellow card) 59'; N'Douassel (yellow card) 65'; Hariono (yellow card) 85'; Mališić (yellow card) 88'	Stadium: Haji Agus Salim Stadium; Referee: Agus Fauzan Arifin

18 June 2019 3	Persib	1–1	TIRA-Persikabo	Soreang, Bandung, West Java
18:30 (UTC+7)	Mališić (yellow card) 34', (goal) 45+2'; N'Douassel (yellow card) 74'; Mihelič (yellow card) 69'	Report	Arnaud 5'; Andy Setyo (yellow card) 9'; Lestaluhu (yellow card) 13'	Stadium: Si Jalak Harupat Stadium; Referee: Hamim Tohari

23 June 2019 4	Persib	1–1	Madura United	Soreang, Bandung, West Java
15:30 (UTC+7)	N'Douassel (yellow card) 71', (goal) 79' (pen.)	Report	Jaime (yellow card) 36'; Imbiri (yellow card) 38'; Asep (yellow card) 64'; Zulfiandi 89'	Stadium: Si Jalak Harupat Stadium; Referee: Aprisman Aranda

30 June 2019 5	Persib	1–2	Bhayangkara	Soreang, Bandung, West Java
15:30 (UTC+7)	N'Douassel 58'; Mihelič (yellow card) 68'	Report	Iskandar (yellow card) 26'; Mulyana 37'; Fatchurohman (yellow card) 86'; Dzumafo 89'	Stadium: Si Jalak Harupat Stadium; Referee: Rully Ruslin Tambuntina

5 July 2019 6	Persebaya	4–0	Persib	Surabaya, East Java
18:30 (UTC+7)	Baldé 34', 44', 58', (yellow card) 90+2'; Hidayat (yellow card) 34'; Dutra (yellow card) 63'; Irfan 81'	Report	Idrus (yellow card) 22'	Stadium: Gelora Bung Tomo Stadium; Referee: Aprisman Aranda

10 July 2019 7	Persija	1–1	Persib	Central Jakarta, DKI Jakarta
15:30 (UTC+7)	Simanjuntak (yellow card) 34'; Abdurrahman (yellow card) 70'; Simić 75'; Setiawan (red card) 78'	Report	Hariono (yellow card) 16'; Indra (yellow card) 37'; Jufriyanto (yellow card) 49'; Mihelič (yellow card) 68'; N'Douassel (yellow card) 79'; Geworkýan 90+1'	Stadium: Gelora Bung Karno Stadium; Referee: Fariq Hitaba

16 July 2019 8	Persib	2–0	Kalteng Putra	Soreang, Bandung, West Java
18:30 (UTC+7)	Mališić (yellow card) 31' (yellow-red card) 90+3'; Febri 68', 79'; Jufriyanto (yellow card) 75'	Report	Maulana (yellow card) 4'; Wanggai (yellow card) 30'; John (yellow card) 46'	Stadium: Si Jalak Harupat Stadium; Referee: Yeni Krisdianto

21 July 2019 9	PSIS	0–1	Persib	Magelang, Special Region of Yogyakarta
15:30 (UTC+7)	Tahar (yellow card) 34'; Patrick Mota (yellow card) 45' (yellow-red card) 45'; Hari Nur (yellow card) 66'	Report	Saepulloh (yellow card) 12'; Mihelič (yellow card) 44'; Henhen (yellow card) 51'; N'Douassel 78'; Idrus (yellow card) 87'	Stadium: Madya Magelang Stadium; Referee: Hamim Tohari

26 July 2019 10	Persib	0–2	Bali United	Soreang, Bandung, West Java
18:30 (UTC+7)	Jufriyanto (yellow card) 21'; N'Douassel (yellow card) 69'	Report	Lilipaly 3'; Dias (yellow card) 32'; Fahmi (yellow card) 50'; Paulo Sérgio (yellow card) 70'; Hendrawan (yellow card) 82'; Spasojević 90+4'	Stadium: Si Jalak Harupat Stadium; Referee: Dwi Purba

30 July 2019 11	Arema	5–1	Persib	Malang, East Java
18:30 (UTC+7)	Dendi 4'; Konaté 5', (yellow card) 42'; Rocha 40'; Rivaldi 68', 90', (yellow card) 70'; Hardianto (yellow card) 86'; Hendro (yellow card) 89'	Report	Febri (yellow card) 11', (goal) 90+2'; Mihelič (yellow card) 16'; Eka (yellow card) 66'	Stadium: Kanjuruhan Stadium; Referee: Aprisman Aranda

4 August 2019 12	Barito Putera	1–0	Persib	Martapura, Banjar, South Kalimantan
19:30 (UTC+8)	Gavin (yellow card) 53'; Rafael Silva (yellow card) 68'; Ady (yellow card) 71', (goal) 90+4'	Report		Stadium: Demang Lehman Stadium; Referee: Nusur Fadillah

8 August 2019 13	Persela	2–2	Persib	Lamongan, East Java
18:30 (UTC+7)	Alex 13', 61'; Amevor (yellow card) 33'; Eky Taufik (yellow card) 74'	Report	Vizcarra 14'; Jufriyanto 21', (yellow card) 51'; Wirawan (yellow card) 24'; Febri (yellow card) 89'	Stadium: Surajaya Stadium; Referee: Ikhsan Prasetya Jati

14 August 2019 14	Persib	2–2	Borneo	Soreang, Bandung, West Java
18:30 (UTC+7)	Ghozali 9'; Vizcarra 24'; Abdul Aziz (yellow card) 31'; Indra (yellow card) 39'; Hariono (yellow card) 72'; Eka (yellow card) 90+4'	Report	Firdaus (yellow card) 32'; Sultan (yellow card) 49' (yellow-red card) 90+4'; Lerby 63'; Renan 73' (pen.)	Stadium: Si Jalak Harupat Stadium; Referee: Musthofa Umarella

18 August 2019 15	PSM	3–1	Persib	Makassar, South Sulawesi
19:30 (UTC+8)	Pluim 41', 47'; Zulham 44'	Report	Vizcarra (yellow card) 18'; N'Douassel (yellow card) 26', (goal) 49'	Stadium: Andi Mattalata Stadium; Referee: Faulur Rosyid

25 August 2019 16	Badak Lampung	1–1	Persib	Bandar Lampung, Lampung
20:30 (UTC+7)	Hariyanto 11'; Akbar (yellow card) 20'; Zainal (yellow card) 38'; Beny (yellow card) 44'; Jujun (yellow card) 82'	Report	Dedi (yellow card) 45'; Ghozali 64'; Idrus (yellow card) 70'; Abdul Aziz (yellow card) 79'	Stadium: Sumpah Pemuda Stadium; Referee: Fariq Hitaba

30 August 2019 17	Persib	1–0	PSS	Soreang, Bandung, West Java
18:30 (UTC+7)	Kuipers (yellow card) 10'; Jufriyanto (yellow card) 66'; Supardi (yellow card) 81'; Eka 90'	Report	Guilherme (yellow card) 40'; Yudo (yellow card) 75'; Ferreira (yellow card) 90+2'	Stadium: Si Jalak Harupat Stadium; Referee: Yeni Krisdianto

14 September 2019 18	TIRA-Persikabo	1–1	Persib	Bogor, West Java
18:15 (UTC+7)	Osas 16' (pen.), (yellow card) 32'; Guntur (yellow card) 22'; Munadi (yellow card) 36'	Report	Wirawan (yellow card) 34'; Kuipers 45+2'; Vizcarra (yellow card) 57'; Febri (yellow card) 90+2'	Stadium: Pakansari Stadium; Referee: Musthofa Umarella

18 September 2019 19	Persib	1–1	Semen Padang	Soreang, Bandung, West Java
18:30 (UTC+7)	Ghozali 20'; Jufriyanto (yellow card) 66'	Report	Yoo Hyun-goo (yellow card) 28'; Barthélémy (yellow card) 9'; Dedi (yellow card) 64'; Rifki (yellow card) 64'	Stadium: Si Jalak Harupat Stadium; Referee: Faulur Rosyid

23 September 2019 20	Persipura	1–3	Persib	Sidoarjo, East Java
15:30 (UTC+7)	Tjoe (yellow card) 18'; Wanggai (yellow card) 30'; Bonai 45' (pen.); Ferre (yellow card) 90+1'	Report	N'Douassel 39', 47'; Vizcarra (yellow card) 44'; Febri 75'	Stadium: Gelora Delta Stadium; Referee: Tabrani

5 October 2019 21	Madura United	2–1	Persib	Bangkalan, East Java
18:30 (UTC+7)	Kuipers 26' (o.g.); Jaime (yellow card) 33'; Beto 64' (pen.); Guntur (yellow card) 73'; Syahrian (yellow card) 78'; Slamet (yellow card) 90'	Report	Febri 3'; N'Douassel (yellow card) 33'	Stadium: Gelora Bangkalan Stadium; Referee: Faulur Rosyid

18 October 2019 22	Persib	4–1	Persebaya	Gianyar, Bali
19:30 (UTC+8)	Febri 31', 84'; Vizcarra (yellow card) 38'; Jufriyanto 40'; van Kippersluis 60'	Report	Diogo Campos (yellow card) 35' (yellow-red card) 79', (goal) 71' (pen.); Andri (yellow card) 58'	Stadium: Kapten I Wayan Dipta Stadium; Referee: Abdul Rahman

23 October 2019 23	Bhayangkara	0–0	Persib	South Jakarta, DKI Jakarta
18:30 (UTC+7)	Putu Gede (yellow card) 70'	Report	Vizcarra (yellow card) 88'	Stadium: PTIK Stadium; Referee: Tabrani

28 October 2019 24	Persib	2–0	Persija	Gianyar, Bali
16:30 (UTC+8)	Frets 52'; N'Douassel 59'	Report	Chand (yellow card) 63'; Xandão (yellow card) 81'	Stadium: Kapten I Wayan Dipta Stadium; Referee: Dwi Purba

1 November 2019 25	Kalteng Putra	0–2	Persib	Palangka Raya, Central Kalimantan
18:30 (UTC+7)	Gomes (yellow card) 8'; Wanggai (red card) 29'; Riza (yellow card) 70'; Matsunaga (yellow card) 78'	Report	Jufriyanto (yellow card) 30'; Febri (yellow card) 41'; Kuipers (yellow card) 45+3'; van Kippersluis 45+4'; Idrus (yellow card) 47'; N'Douassel 61'	Stadium: Tuah Pahoe Stadium; Referee: Abdul Rahman

6 November 2019 26	Persib	2–1	PSIS	Soreang, Bandung, West Java
18:30 (UTC+7)	N'Douassel 9', (yellow card) 63'; Febri 73' (pen.)	Report	Tahar (yellow card) 46'; Bruno Silva 53', (yellow card) 77'; Finky (yellow card) 64'	Stadium: Si Jalak Harupat Stadium; Referee: Nusur Fadillah

12 November 2019 27	Persib	3–0	Arema	Soreang, Bandung, West Java
15:30 (UTC+7)	Kim 6', (yellow card) 31'; Nazari 36'; Frets 39'; Dedi (yellow card) 67'	Report	Alfarizi (yellow card) 9'; Latief (yellow card) 27'; Tuasalamony (yellow card) 58'	Stadium: Si Jalak Harupat Stadium; Referee: Dwi Susilo

24 November 2019 28	Persib	0–0	Barito Putera	Soreang, Bandung, West Java
15:30 (UTC+7)		Report	Ronny (yellow card) 9'; Sayuri (yellow card) 56'; Ibo (yellow card) 76' (yellow-red card) 80'	Stadium: Si Jalak Harupat Stadium; Referee: Hamim Tohari

28 November 2019 29	Bali United	3–2	Persib	Gianyar, Bali
21:45 (UTC+8)	Tupamahu (yellow card) 18' (yellow-red card) 89'; Supardi 56' (o.g.); Spasojević 73', (yellow card) 85'; Lilipaly 79'; Andhika (yellow card) 81'	Report	N'Douassel (yellow card) 13' (yellow-red card) 89'; Nazari (yellow card) 26'; Kim 45+3'; Frets 60'; Dedi (yellow card) 71'	Stadium: Kapten I Wayan Dipta Stadium; Referee: Aprisman Aranda

3 December 2019 30	Persib	0–2	Persela	Soreang, Bandung, West Java
18:30 (UTC+7)		Report	Rafinha 12'; Hatuwe (yellow card) 32'; Jufriyanto 56' (o.g.); Arif (red card) 65'	Stadium: Si Jalak Harupat Stadium; Referee: Abdul Rahman

7 December 2019 31	PSS	0–0	Persib	Yogyakarta, Special Region of Yogyakarta
18:30 (UTC+7)	Ikhwan (yellow card) 53'; Kambuaya (yellow card) 64'; Derry (yellow card) 85'	Report	Jufriyanto (yellow card) 40'; Febri (yellow card) 47'	Stadium: Maguwoharjo Stadium; Referee: Musthofa Umarella

11 December 2019 32	Borneo	0–1	Persib	Samarinda, East Kalimantan
18:45 (UTC+8)	Nur Diansyah (yellow card) 31'	Report	Ghozali 41'	Stadium: Segiri Samarinda Stadium; Referee: Dwi Purba

16 December 2019 33	Persib	4–0	Badak Lampung	Soreang, Bandung, West Java
18:30 (UTC+7)	Idrus (yellow card) 14'; N'Douassel 48', 84'; Kuipers 54', (yellow card) 70'; Zalnando (yellow card) 67'; Vizcarra 90'	Report	Mališić (yellow card) 29'; Fahri (yellow card) 69'; Rahmat (yellow card) 81'	Stadium: Si Jalak Harupat Stadium; Referee: Fariq Hitaba

22 December 2019 34	Persib	5–2	PSM	Soreang, Bandung, West Java
15:30 (UTC+7)	N'Douassel 7', 32', 70', 83'; Dedi (yellow card) 30'; Vizcarra (yellow card) 39'; Hariono 67' (pen.); Nazari (yellow card) 69'; Herdiana (yellow card) 80'	Report	Sinaga 6'; Asnawi (yellow card) 28'; Beny (yellow card) 65'; Maitimo 73'; Rasyid (yellow card) 75'; Walian (yellow card) 78'	Stadium: Si Jalak Harupat Stadium; Referee: Musthofa Umarella

=== Piala Indonesia ===
==== Round of 32 ====
27 January 2019 First leg	Persiwa	0–0	Persib	Cilacap, Central Java
15:00 (UTC+7)		Report		Stadium: Wijayakusuma Stadium; Referee: Ikhsan Prasetya Jati

11 February 2019 Second leg	Persib	7–0 (7–0 agg.)	Persiwa	Soreang, Bandung, West Java
15:00 (UTC+7)	N'Douassel 16', 38', 55'; Lopičić 51' (pen.); Vizcarra 65'; Beckham 79'; Ghozali 90'	Report		Stadium: Si Jalak Harupat Stadium; Referee: Handri Kristanto
Note: This match was originally scheduled on 4 February 2019 at Gelora Bandung Lautan Api Stadium but it was postponed because they didn't have police permit for infrastructure security factors there.

==== Round of 16 ====
18 February 2019 First leg	Persib	1–1	Arema	Soreang, Bandung, West Java
15:00 (UTC+7)	Erwin 69'	Report	Rafli 75'	Stadium: Si Jalak Harupat Stadium; Referee: Dwi Purba

22 February 2019 Second leg	Arema	2–2 (3–3 (a) agg.)	Persib	Malang, East Java
15:00 (UTC+7)	Konaté 3'; Gladiador 73'	Report	N'Douassel 45+2' (pen.); Ghozali 85'	Stadium: Kanjuruhan Stadium; Referee: Ikhsan Prasetya Jati

==== Quarter-finals ====
24 April 2019 First leg	Borneo	2–1	Persib	Samarinda, East Kalimantan
16:30 (UTC+8)	Conti 40'; Asri 90+2'	Report	N'Douassel 16'	Stadium: Segiri Stadium; Referee: Agus Fauzan Arifin

4 May 2019 Second leg	Persib	3–2 (4–4 (a) agg.)	Borneo	Soreang, Bandung, West Java
15:30 (UTC+7)	Ghozali 5'; N'Douassel 86' (pen.); Supardi 90+4'	Report	Guseynov 69'; Lerby 90+1'	Stadium: Si Jalak Harupat Stadium; Referee: Fariq Hitaba
Note: This match was originally scheduled on 29 April 2019 but it was postponed to 4 May 2019 as they didn't get police permit to hold the match because the police focus on securing 2019 Indonesian general election and May Day.
