= 2017 Persib Bandung season =

Indonesian football club season

Persib Bandung
2017 season
- Owner: PT Persib Bandung Bermartabat
- CEO: Glenn Sugita
- Head coach: Djadjang Nurdjaman (until 16 July 2017); Herrie Setyawan (caretaker, until 2 September 2017); Emral Abus (from 2 September 2017)
- Stadium: Gelora Bandung Lautan Api (first round); Si Jalak Harupat (second round)
- Liga 1: 13th
- Top goalscorer: League: Raphael Maitimo (9); All: Raphael Maitimo (9)
Home colours	Away colours	Third colours

The 2017 season was the 58th season in the history of Persib Bandung, and the club's 21st consecutive season in the top-flight of Indonesian football since it became fully professional. The season covers the period from 1 January 2017 to 31 December 2017.

== Month by month review ==
Before the season begins, persib bandung had followed the preseason tournament, the President Cup. Different from the previous year, now the club dubbed "maung bandung" it failed to achieve the preseason title for the second time. Now, they are only able to sit in third place.

In 2017, during the club's 84th anniversary, Persib Bandung signed several new players. These included Michael Essien, a former Chelsea player, and Carlton Cole, a former West Ham United player. All parties were aiming Persib reaching high rank in league 1.

At the beginning of the season, performan performance is quite good. Persib was always on the path of competition to the championship ladder. Soon, Persib performance slowly decreased so that defeat after defeat always experienced Persib. Djajang Nurdjaman, as a coach persib always urged to resign from his position due to poor performance experienced Persib Bandung. Djanur had time to apply for his retirement to the management Persib, but rejected. After appealing for a second resignation, Djanur officially resigned on July 16, 2017, after a match between Mitra Kukar against Persib with a score of 1-2 ended in defeat for Persib. Now his position is temporarily replaced by Herrie Setiawan who is an assistant from Djanur.

== Coaching staff ==
Position	Staff
First-team Manager	(Indonesia) Emral Abus
Assistant Manager	(Indonesia) Herrie Setyawan
Goalkeeper Coach	(Indonesia) Anwar Sanusi
Fitness Coach	(Indonesia) Yaya Sunarya
Under-21 Team Manager	(Indonesia) Budiman Yunus

Source: Persib Bandung

== Squad information ==
=== First team squad ===
No.	Name	Nat.	Date of birth (age)	Signed in	Contract until	Signed from	Transfer Fee	Notes
Goalkeepers
1	M. Natshir Fadhil Mahbuby	(Indonesia)	13 February 1993 (age 33)	2014	2018	(Indonesia) Arema Cronus	?	
25	Imam Arief Fadillah	(Indonesia)	14 December 1989 (age 36)	2017		(Indonesia) Barito Putera	?	
78	I Made Wirawan	(Indonesia)	12 January 1981 (age 45)	2013	2018	(Indonesia) Persiba Balikpapan	?	
Defenders
2	Wildansyah	(Indonesia)	3 January 1987 (age 39)	2017		(Indonesia) Sriwijaya F.C.	?	
3	Vladimir Vujovic	(Montenegro)	23 July 1982 (age 44)	2014	2018	(Montenegro) OFK Petrovac	?	Foreign player
4	Purwaka Yudhi	(Indonesia)	11 April 1984 (age 42)	2016	2017	(Indonesia) Arema FC	?	
6	Tony Sucipto	(Indonesia)	12 February 1986 (age 40)	2012	2018	(Indonesia) Persija Jakarta	?	2nd Vice Captain
16	Achmad Jufriyanto	(Indonesia)	2 July 1987 (age 39)	2017		(Indonesia) Sriwijaya F.C.	?	
18	Jajang Sukmara	(Indonesia)	18 November 1988 (age 37)	2011	2018	(Indonesia) Persib Bandung U-21	?	
21	Henhen Herdiana	(Indonesia)	10 September 1995 (age 31)	2017		(Indonesia) Persib Bandung U-21	?	Under-23 Player
22	Supardi Nasir	(Indonesia)	9 April 1983 (age 43)	2017		(Indonesia) Sriwijaya F.C.	?	
Midfielders
5	Michael Essien	(Ghana)	3 December 1982 (age 43)	2017		(Greece) Panathinaikos	?	Marquee player
7	Atep	(Indonesia)	5 June 1985 (age 41)	2008	2018	(Indonesia) Persija Jakarta	?	Captain
8	Gian Zola	(Indonesia)	5 August 1998 (age 28)	2015	2020	(Indonesia) Persib Bandung U-21	?	Under-23 Player
10	Raphael Maitimo	(Indonesia)	17 March 1984 (age 42)	2017		(Indonesia) Arema FC	?	
11	Dedi Kusnandar	(Indonesia)	23 July 1991 (age 35)	2017		(Malaysia) Sabah FA	?	
13	Febri Haryadi	(Indonesia)	19 February 1996 (age 30)	2015	2020	(Indonesia) Persib Bandung U-21	?	Under-23 Player
19	Ahmad Basith	(Indonesia)	15 June 1996 (age 30)	2017		(Indonesia) Persib Bandung U-21	?	Under-23 Player
23	Kim Jeffrey Kurniawan	(Indonesia)	23 March 1990 (age 36)	2016	2018	(Indonesia) Pelita Bandung Raya	?	
24	Hariono	(Indonesia)	2 October 1985 (age 41)	2008	2018	(Indonesia) Deltras Sidoarjo	?	Vice Captain
20	Fulgensius Billy Paji Keraf	(Indonesia)	8 May 1997 (age 29)	2017	TBA	(Indonesia) SSB Asiop	?	Under-23 Player
Forwards
9	Sergio van Dijk	(Indonesia)	6 August 1982 (age 44)	2016	2018	(Australia) Adelaide United	?	
70	Ezechiel N'Douassel	(Chad)	22 April 1988 (age 38)	2017		(Israel) Hapoel Tel Aviv	?	Foreign Player
15	Angga Febryanto Putra	(Indonesia)	4 February 1995 (age 31)	2017		(Indonesia) Persib Bandung U-21	?	Under-23 Player
17	Shohei Matsunaga	(Japan)	7 January 1989 (age 37)	2017		(Indonesia) Persiba Balikpapan	?	Foreign player
82	Tantan	(Indonesia)	6 August 1982 (age 44)	2014	2018	(Indonesia) Sriwijaya FC	?	

== New contracts ==
No.	Pos	Player	Contract length	Contract end	Date	Source

== Transfers ==
=== In ===
No.	Pos	Player	Transferred From	Fee	Date	Source
11	CM	(Indonesia) Dedi Kusnandar	(Malaysia) Sabah FA	Free	25 December 2016	
17	AM	(Japan) Shohei Matsunaga	(Indonesia) Persiba Balikpapan	Free	25 December 2016	
2	CB	(Indonesia) Wildansyah	(Indonesia) Sriwijaya F.C.	Free	25 December 2016	
16	CB	(Indonesia) Achmad Jufriyanto	(Indonesia) Sriwijaya F.C.	Free	26 January 2017	
22	RB	(Indonesia) Supardi	(Indonesia) Sriwijaya F.C.	Free	26 January 2017	
5	DF	(Ghana) Michael Essien	Free agent	Free	14 March 2017	
12	ST	(England) Carlton Cole	Free agent	Free	30 March 2017	
20	LW-RW	(Indonesia) Fulgensius Billy Paji Keraf	(Indonesia) SSB Asiop	Free	13 April 2017	
2	DF	(Indonesia) Purwaka Yudhi	Unattached	Free	1 August 2017	
70	FW	(Chad) Ezechiel N'Douassel	(Israel) Hapoel Tel Aviv	Free	8 August 2017	

=== Out ===
No.	Pos	Player	Transferred To	Fee	Date	Source
13	DF	(Indonesia) M. Agung Pribadi	(Indonesia) Persela Lamongan	Loan	28 December 2016	
4	DF	(Indonesia) Dias Angga Putra	(Indonesia) Bali United	Free	28 December 2016	
5	DF	(Australia) Diogo Ferreira	(Malaysia) Penang FA	Free	28 December 2016	
8	MF	(Indonesia) Muhammad Taufiq	(Indonesia) Bali United	Free	28 December 2016	
17	MF	(Indonesia) Rachmad Hidayat	(Indonesia) Sriwijaya FC	Free	28 December 2016	
10	MF	(Argentina) Robertino Pugliara	(Indonesia) Persipura Jayapura	Free	28 December 2016	
15	FW	(Indonesia) Yandi Sofyan	(Indonesia) Bali United	Free	28 December 2016	
9	FW	(Indonesia) Samsul Arif	(Indonesia) Persela Lamongan	Free	28 December 2016	
11	FW	(Indonesia) Rudiyana	(Indonesia) PSS Sleman	Free	28 December 2016	
91	FW	(Indonesia) David Laly	(Indonesia) Barito Putera	Free	28 December 2016	
12	ST	(England) Carlton Cole	Free agent	Free	4 August 2017	

== Pre-season ==
Win Draw Loss

5 April 2017 1	Persib Bandung	7-0	Persika Karawang	Bandung, West Java
15:00 (UTC+7)	Dedi K; Atep; Matsunaga; Essien; Maitimo; C.Cole			Stadium: Gelora Bandung Lautan Api Stadium; Attendance: TBA; Referee: TBA

8 April 2017 2	Persib Bandung	1-2	Bali United	Bandung, West Java
15:00 (UTC+7)	Essien (yellow card) 72'; Maitimo 86'		Bachdim 15'; Yabes 68'; Yabes (red card) 72'	Stadium: Gelora Bandung Lautan Api Stadium; Attendance: 20000; Referee: Hariyadi

== Competitions ==
=== Overview ===
Competition	Record								Started round	Final position / round	First match	Last match
Competition	G	W	D	L	GF	GA	GD	Win %	Started round	Final position / round	First match	Last match
Liga 1	20	7	7	6	25	19	+6	35.00	—	In Progress	15 April 2017	In Progress
Total	20	7	7	6	25	19	+6	35.00				

Updated to match played 29 July 2017
Source: Competitions

=== Liga 1 ===

Persib XI Go-Jek Traveloka Liga 1 2017

==== League table ====
Locations of the 2017 Liga 1 teams

Pos	Team	Pld	W	D	L	GF	GA	GD	Pts
11	Sriwijaya	34	11	9	14	50	50	0	42 (Note: Head-to-head results: Sriwijaya 2–1 PS TNI; PS TNI 2–1 Sriwijaya.)
12	PS TNI	34	12	6	16	46	58	−12	42
13	Persib	34	9	14	11	39	36	+3	41
14	Persela	34	12	4	18	49	55	−6	40
15	Perseru	34	10	7	17	35	45	−10	37

Source: Go-Jek Traveloka Liga 1, Soccerway
Rules for classification: 1) Points; 2) Head-to-head; 3) Goal Difference; 4) Goals Scored; 5) Drawing.

==== Results summary ====
Overall								Home						Away					
Pld	W	D	L	GF	GA	GD	Pts	W	D	L	GF	GA	GD	W	D	L	GF	GA	GD
20	7	7	6	25	19	+6	28	6	4	0	19	6	+13	1	3	6	6	13	−7

Last updated: 20 May 2017.
Source: Soccerway

==== Results by matchday ====
Matchday	1	2	3	4	5	6	7	8	9	10	11	12	13	14	15	16	17	18	19	20	21	22	23	24	25	26	27	28	29	30	31	32	33	34
Ground	H	A	H	A	H	A	H	A	A	H	A	H	A	H	A	H	A	H	A	H														
Result	D	D	W	W	W	D	D	L	L	W	L	W	L	D	L	D	L	W	D	W														
Position	13	13	5	3	2	2	2																											

Updated to match(es) played on 20 May 2017. Source: Matches
A = Away; H = Home; W = Win; D = Draw; L = Loss

==== Matches ====
Win Draw Loss

First round

15 April 2017 1	Persib	0–0	Arema	Bandung, West Java
18:30 UTC+7		Report		Stadium: Gelora Bandung Lautan Api Stadium; Attendance: 34,150; Referee: Mustofa Umarella

22 April 2017 2	PS TNI	2–2	Persib	Cibinong, Bogor, West Java
18:30 UTC+7	Erwin R 88'; G. Cahyo 90'	Report	Essien 50'; Atep 52'	Stadium: Pakansari Stadium; Attendance: 6,100; Referee: Djumadi Effendi

29 April 2017 3	Persib	2–0	Sriwijaya FC	Bandung, West Java
18:30 UTC+7	Atep 11'; Febri 76'	Report		Stadium: Gelora Bandung Lautan Api Stadium; Attendance: 21,584; Referee: Yeni Kristianto

3 May 2017 4	Gresik United	0–1	Persib	Gresik, East Java
18:30 UTC+7	Billy 90+1'	Report		Stadium: Tri Dharma Stadium; Attendance: 12.405; Referee: Kusni

8 May 2017 5	Persib	1–0	Persipura	Bandung, West Java
18:30 UTC+7	Essien 56' (pen.)			Stadium: Gelora Bandung Lautan Api Stadium; Attendance: 25.000; Referee: Handri Kristanto

13 May 2017 6	Semen Padang	0–0	Persib	Padang, West Sumatera
18:30 UTC+7				Stadium: Haji Agus Salim Stadium

20 May 2017 7	Persib	2–2	Pusamania	Bandung, West Java
18:30 UTC+7	Gian Zola 21'; Vlado 28'		Riswan 17'; Matheus 88'	Stadium: Gelora Bandung Lautan Api Stadium

31 May 2017 8	Bali United	1–0	Persib	Gianyar, Bali
20:30 UTC+7	Marcos 32'			Stadium: Kapten I Wayan Dipta Stadium

4 June 2017 9	Bhayangkara	2–0	Persib	Bekasi, West Java
20:30 UTC+7	Paulo Sérgio 28'; Ilham 82'			Stadium: Patriot Chandrabhaga Stadium

11 June 2017 10	Persib	1–0	Persiba	Bandung, West Java
20:30 UTC+7	Maitimo 87'			Stadium: Gelora Bandung Lautan Api Stadium

18 June 2017 11	Barito	1–0	Persib	Banjarmasin, South Kalimantan
20:30 UTC+7	Córdoba 33'			Stadium: May 17th Stadium

5 July 2017 12	Persib	2–1	PSM	Bandung, West Java
18:30 UTC+7	Matsunaga 38'; Atep 54'		Pluim 71'	Stadium: Gelora Bandung Lautan Api Stadium

9 July 2017 13	Madura United	3–1	Persib	Madura, East Java
18:30 UTC+7	Odemwingie 20' 65'; Greg 86'		Maitimo 81'	Stadium: Gelora Ratu Pamelingan Stadium; Referee: Kusni

12 July 2017 14	Persib	1–1	Persela	Bandung, West Java
18:30 UTC+7	Matsunaga 32'		Samsul 75' (pen.)	Stadium: Gelora Bandung Lautan Api Stadium

15 July 2017 15	Kukar	2–1	Persib	Tenggarong, East Kalimantan
18:30 UTC+7	Marclei 41' (pen.); Kyun 82'		Billy 20'	Stadium: Aji Imbut Stadium

21 July 2017 16	Persib	1–1	Persija	Bandung, West Java
18:30 UTC+7	Jufriyanto 14'		Lestaluhu 18'; Sute (red card) 70'	Stadium: Gelora Bandung Lautan Api Stadium; Attendance: 36.500; Referee: Aprisman Aranda

29 July 2017 17	Perseru	2–1	Persib	Yapen, Papua
15:00 UTC+9	Arthur 63' 84'		Matsunaga 88' (pen.)	Stadium: Marora Stadium

Second Round

5 August 2017 18	Persib	3–1	PS TNI	Soreang, Bandung, West Java
18:30 UTC+7	Maitimo 15' 64'; Essien 20'	Report	Sansan 89'	Stadium: Si Jalak Harupat Stadium; Attendance: 10,000; Referee: Shaun Evans

12 August 2017 19	Arema	0–0	Persib Bandung	Malang, East Java
18:30 UTC+7				Stadium: Kanjuruhan Stadium; Attendance: 20.000; Referee: Mooud Bonyadifar

5 August 2017 20	Persib	6–0	Gresik	Soreang, Bandung, West Java
18:30 UTC+7	Maitimo 39' 40' 74'; Andre Agustiar 45' O.G; Billy 78'; N'Douassel 90+2'			Stadium: Si Jalak Harupat Stadium; Attendance: 10,000; Referee: Moch.Agung

28 August 2017 21	Persipura	0–0	Persib	Jayapura, Papua
13:30 UTC+9			N'Douassel (yellow card) 35'	Stadium: Mandala Stadium; Referee: Spartak Danilenko

4 September 2017 22	Sriwijaya FC	1–4	Persib	Palembang, South Sumatera
18:30 UTC+7	Meraudje (yellow card) 37'; Basna (yellow card) 66'; Belaïd 94'		N'Douassel 17'; Essien 32' (yellow card) 69'; Febri 60'; Billy 90+3'	Stadium: Gelora Sriwijaya Stadium; Referee: Abdul Rahman Salasa
