= Mario Jardel (footballer, born 2000) =

Indonesian footballer

Personal information
- Full name: Mario Jardel
- Date of birth: 7 November 2000 (age 26)
- Place of birth: Bogor, Indonesia
- Height: 1.65 m (5 ft 5 in)
- Position: Full-back

Team information
- Current team: Persita Tangerang
- Number: 66

Youth career
- 2017–2019: Persib Bandung

Senior career*
| Years | Team | Apps | (Gls) |
| 2018–2022 | Persib Bandung | 6 | (0) |
| 2022– | Persita Tangerang | 118 | (0) |
- * Club domestic league appearances and goals as of 31 October 2026

Mario Jardel (born 7 November 2000) is an Indonesian professional footballer who plays as a full-back for Super League club Persita Tangerang.

== Club career ==
=== Persib Bandung ===
He was signed for Persib Bandung to play in Liga 1 in the 2018 season. Mario made his first-team debut on 16 October 2021 in a match against Bhayangkara as a substitute for Henhen Herdiana in the 90+3rd minute at the Moch. Soebroto Stadium, Magelang.

=== Persita Tengerang ===
Jardel was signed for Persita Tangerang to play in Liga 1 in the 2022–23 season. He made his league debut on 28 August 2022 in a match against Bhayangkara at the Wibawa Mukti Stadium, Cikarang.

== Career statistics ==
=== Club ===
As of 31 October 2026.

| Club | Season | League | | | Cup | | Continental | | Other | | Total | |
| Club | Season | Division | Apps | Goals | Apps | Goals | Apps | Goals | Apps | Goals | Apps | Goals |
|---|---|---|---|---|---|---|---|---|---|---|---|---|
| Persib Bandung | 2018 | Liga 1 | 0 | 0 | 0 | 0 | – | | 0 | 0 | 0 | 0 |
| Persib Bandung | 2020 | Liga 1 | 0 | 0 | 0 | 0 | – | | 0 | 0 | 0 | 0 |
| Persib Bandung | 2021–22 | Liga 1 | 6 | 0 | 0 | 0 | – | | 0 | 0 | 6 | 0 |
| Persib Bandung | Total | | 6 | 0 | 0 | 0 | – | | 0 | 0 | 6 | 0 |
| Persita Tangerang | 2022–23 | Liga 1 | 14 | 0 | 0 | 0 | – | | 2 (Note: Appearances in Indonesia President's Cup) | 0 | 16 | 0 |
| Persita Tangerang | 2023–24 | Liga 1 | 33 | 0 | 0 | 0 | – | | 0 | 0 | 33 | 0 |
| Persita Tangerang | 2024–25 | Liga 1 | 31 | 0 | 0 | 0 | – | | 0 | 0 | 31 | 0 |
| Persita Tangerang | 2025–26 | Super League | 33 | 0 | 0 | 0 | – | | 0 | 0 | 33 | 0 |
| Persita Tangerang | 2026–27 | Super League | 7 | 0 | 0 | 0 | – | | 0 | 0 | 7 | 0 |
| Career total | | | 124 | 0 | 0 | 0 | 0 | 0 | 2 | 0 | 126 | 0 |
