= Dendi Maulana =

Indonesian footballer

Personal information
- Full name: Dendi Agustan Maulana
- Date of birth: 19 August 1995 (age 31)
- Place of birth: Serang, Indonesia
- Height: 1.83 m (6 ft 0 in)
- Position: Defender

Team information
- Current team: Barito Putera
- Number: 91

Senior career*
Years	Team	Apps	(Gls)
2015–2016	Persip Pekalongan	12	(0)
2017	PSGC Ciamis	15	(0)
2018–2019	Kalteng Putra	44	(1)
2020–2022	PSS Sleman	9	(0)
2022–2023	Barito Putera	13	(0)
2023–2024	Kalteng Putra	15	(0)
2024–2025	Sriwijaya	3	(0)
2026	PSPS Pekanbaru	7	(0)
2026–	Barito Putera	2	(0)
- * Club domestic league appearances and goals as of 26 September 2026

Dendi Agustan Maulana (born 19 August 1995) is an Indonesian professional footballer who plays as a defender for Championship club Barito Putera.

== Club career ==
=== PSGC Ciamis ===
He was signed for PSGC Ciamis to play in Liga 2 in the 2017 season and made 15 league appearances for PSGC Ciamis.

=== Kalteng Putra ===
In 2018, Dendi Maulana signed a contract with Indonesian Liga 2 club Kalteng Putra.

=== PSS Sleman ===
He was signed for PSS Sleman to play in Liga 1 in the 2020 season. Dendi Maulana made his league debut on 1 November 2021 in a match against Borneo at the Manahan Stadium, Surakarta.

=== Barito Putera ===
Dendi was signed for Barito Putera to play in Liga 1 in the 2022–23 season. He made his league debut on 23 July 2022 in a match against Madura United at the Gelora Ratu Pamelingan Stadium, Pamekasan.

== Career statistics ==
=== Club ===
As of match played 26 September 2026

Club	Season	League			Cup (Note: Includes Piala Indonesia)		Continental		Other		Total	
Club	Season	Division	Apps	Goals	Apps	Goals	Apps	Goals	Apps	Goals	Apps	Goals
Persip Pekalongan	2015	Premier Division	0	0	0	0	–		0	0	0	0
Persip Pekalongan	2016	ISC B	12	0	0	0	–		0	0	12	0
Persip Pekalongan	Total		12	0	0	0	–		0	0	12	0
PSGC Ciamis	2017	Liga 2	15	0	0	0	–		0	0	15	0
Kalteng Putra	2018	Liga 2	28	1	0	0	–		0	0	28	1
Kalteng Putra	2019	Liga 2	16	0	0	0	–		1 (Note: Appearances in Indonesia President's Cup)	0	17	0
Kalteng Putra	Total		44	1	0	0	–		1	0	45	1
PSS Sleman	2020	Liga 1	0	0	0	0	–		0	0	0	0
PSS Sleman	2021–22	Liga 1	9	0	0	0	–		1 (Note: Appearances in Menpora Cup)	0	10	0
PSS Sleman	Total		9	0	0	0	–		1	0	10	0
Barito Putera	2022–23	Liga 1	13	0	0	0	–		3	0	16	0
Kalteng Putra	2023–24	Liga 2	15	0	0	0	–		0	0	15	0
Sriwijaya	2024–25	Liga 2	3	0	0	0	–		0	0	3	0
PSPS Pekanbaru	2025–26	Championship	7	0	0	0	–		0	0	7	0
Barito Putera	2026–27	Championship	2	0	0	0	–		0	0	2	0
Career total			120	1	0	0	0	0	5	0	125	1

== Honours ==
=== Club ===
Kalteng Putra

- Liga 2 third place (play-offs): 2018

PSS Sleman

- Menpora Cup third place: 2021
