= Aqil Savik =

Indonesian association footballer

- Aqil with Persija in 2026

Personal information
- Full name: Muchamad Aqil Savik
- Date of birth: 17 January 1999 (age 27)
- Place of birth: Bandung, Indonesia
- Height: 1.85 m (6 ft 1 in)
- Position: Goalkeeper

Team information
- Current team: Persija Jakarta
- Number: 1

Youth career
- 2014–2017: Persib Bandung

Senior career*
Years	Team	Apps	(Gls)
2018–2022	Persib Bandung	2	(0)
2020	→ Bandung United (loan)	0	(0)
2022–2026	Bhayangkara	55	(0)
2026–	Persija Jakarta	0	(0)

International career
2017–2018	Indonesia U19	8	(0)
Medal record
Men's football
Representing Indonesia
AFF U-19 Youth Championship
Third place	2017 Myanmar
Third place	2018 Indonesia	Team
- * Club domestic league appearances and goals as of 22 October 2026

Muchamad Aqil Savik (born 17 January 1999 in Bandung) is an Indonesian professional footballer who plays as a goalkeeper for Super League club Persija Jakarta.

== Club career ==
=== Persib Bandung ===
Savik went through the youth system of his hometown club Persib Bandung before joining the senior squad in 2018. He professionally debuted in the 2019 Liga 1 season. Due to a surplus of experienced goalkeepers, Persib in 2020 loaned him to feeder club Bandung United in Liga 3.

=== Bhayangkara ===
Savik was signed for Bhayangkara to play in Liga 1 in the 2022–23 season. He made his league debut on 8 December 2022 in a match against Bali United at the Manahan Stadium, Surakarta.

=== Persija Jakarta ===
On June 30, 2026, Persija Jakarta announced the signing of Aqil Savik as Persija's new addition for the 2026–2027 season.

== International career ==
Savik represented the Indonesia U-18 team in the 2017 AFF U-18 Youth Championship and Indonesia U-19 in the 2018 AFC U-19 Championship. He received his first call to join the senior Indonesia national football team in May 2021.

== Career statistics ==
=== Club ===
As of 3 November 2026

Club	Season	League			Cup		Continental		Other		Total	
Club	Season	Division	Apps	Goals	Apps	Goals	Apps	Goals	Apps	Goals	Apps	Goals
Persib Bandung	2018	Liga 1	0	0	0	0	–		0	0	0	0
Persib Bandung	2019	Liga 1	2	0	0	0	–		0	0	2	0
Persib Bandung	2021–22	Liga 1	0	0	0	0	–		0	0	0	0
Persib Bandung	Total		2	0	0	0	–		0	0	2	0
Bandung United (loan)	2020	Liga 3	0	0	0	0	–		0	0	0	0
Bhayangkara	2022–23	Liga 1	6	0	0	0	–		0	0	6	0
Bhayangkara	2023–24	Liga 1	16	0	0	0	–		0	0	16	0
Bhayangkara	2024–25	Liga 2	3	0	0	0	–		0	0	3	0
Bhayangkara	2025–26	Super League	30	0	0	0	–		0	0	30	0
Bhayangkara	Total		55	0	0	0	–		0	0	55	0
Persija Jakarta	2026–27	Super League	0	0	1 (Note: Appearances in I-League Cup)	0	–		2 (Note: Appearances in Indonesia President's Cup)	0	1	0
Career total			55	0	1	0	0	0	2	0	58	0

== Honours ==
=== Club ===
Bhayangkara

- Liga 2 runner-up: 2024–25

Persija Jakarta

- Piala Presiden third place: 2026

=== International ===
Indonesia U-19

- AFF U-19 Youth Championship third place: 2017, 2018
