= Riswan Yusman =

Indonesian footballer

Personal information
- Full name: Riswan Yusman
- Date of birth: May 30, 1997 (age 29)
- Place of birth: Ternate, Indonesia
- Height: 1.70 m (5 ft 7 in)
- Positions: Midfielder; winger

Youth career
- 2014–2016: Frenz United

Senior career*
Years	Team	Apps	(Gls)
2017–2018	Borneo	23	(2)
2018	Persibat Batang	9	(0)
2019	Madura	8	(1)
2021	Persela Lamongan	5	(0)
- * Club domestic league appearances and goals

Riswan Yusman (born May 30, 1997) is an Indonesian professional footballer who plays as a midfielder.

== Club career ==
=== Borneo FC ===
He was signed for Borneo to play in Liga 1 in the 2017 season. Riswan made his debut on 22 April 2017 in a match against Sriwijaya. On 20 May 2017, Riswan scored his first goal for Borneo against Persib Bandung in the 17th minute at the Gelora Bandung Lautan Api Stadium, Bandung.

=== Persela Lamongan ===
He was signed for Persela Lamongan to play in Liga 1 in the 2021 season. Riswan made his league debut on 10 September 2021 in a match against Persipura Jayapura at the Wibawa Mukti Stadium, Cikarang.

== Career statistics ==
=== Club ===
As of match played 23 November 2021

Club	Season	League			Cup		Continental		Other		Total	
Club	Season	Division	Apps	Goals	Apps	Goals	Apps	Goals	Apps	Goals	Apps	Goals
Borneo	2017	Liga 1	21	2	0	0	0	0	0	0	21	2
Borneo	2018	Liga 1	2	0	0	0	0	0	0	0	2	0
Persibat Batang	2018	Liga 2	9	0	0	0	0	0	0	0	9	0
Madura	2019	Liga 2	8	1	0	0	0	0	0	0	8	1
Persela Lamongan	2021	Liga 1	5	0	0	0	0	0	0	0	5	0
Career total			45	3	0	0	0	0	0	0	45	3
