= Ghozali Siregar =

Indonesian footballer

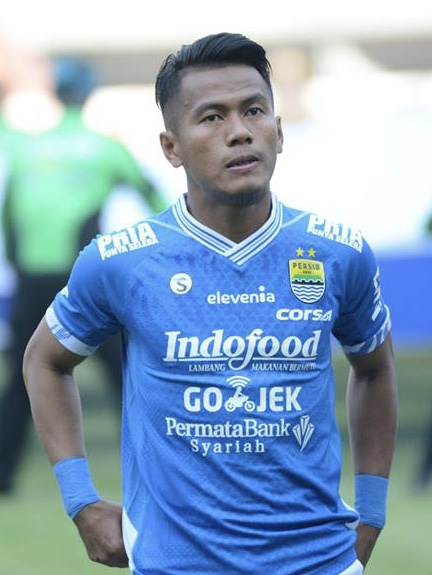
- Ghozali playing for Persib Bandung in 2018

Personal information
- Full name: Ghozali Muharam Siregar
- Date of birth: 7 July 1992 (age 34)
- Place of birth: Dolok Sanggul, Indonesia
- Height: 1.60 m (5 ft 3 in)
- Position: Winger

Team information
- Current team: PSMS Medan
- Number: 77

Senior career*
Years	Team	Apps	(Gls)
2010–2015	Pro Duta	69	(18)
2015–2016	Pelita Bandung Raya	2	(0)
2016–2017	Gresik United	29	(4)
2017	PSM Makassar	14	(0)
2018–2021	Persib Bandung	58	(9)
2021–2022	PSMS Medan	13	(0)
2022–2023	Persita Tangerang	12	(0)
2023–2025	Bekasi City	26	(1)
2025–	PSMS Medan	5	(0)

International career
2007	Indonesia U16	4	(0)
- * Club domestic league appearances and goals as of 27 December 2025

Ghozali Muharam Siregar (born 7 July 1992) is an Indonesian professional footballer who plays as a winger for Championship club PSMS Medan.

== Club career ==
=== PSM Makassar ===
He was signed for PSM Makassar to play in Liga 1. Ghozali made his league debut on 16 April 2017 in a match against Persela Lamongan at the Andi Mattalatta Stadium, Makassar.

=== Persib Bandung ===
In 2018, Ghozali signed a contract with Indonesian Liga 1 club Persib Bandung. He made his league debut on 1 April 2018 in a match against Sriwijaya. On 26 July 2018, Ghozali scored his first goal for Persib against Persebaya Surabaya in the 53rd minute at the Gelora Bung Tomo Stadium, Surabaya.

=== PSMS Medan ===
In 2021, Ghozali signed a contract with Indonesian Liga 2 club PSMS Medan. He made his league debut on 7 October against KS Tiga Naga at the Gelora Sriwijaya Stadium, Palembang.

=== Persita Tengerang ===
Ghozali was signed for Persita Tangerang to play in Liga 1 in the 2022–23 season. He made his league debut on 25 July 2022 in a match against Persik Kediri at the Indomilk Arena, Tangerang.

=== Bekasi City ===
Ghozali was signed for F.C. Bekasi City to play in Liga 2 in the 2023–24 season. He made his league debut on 11 September 2023 as a substituted in a 2–3 away win against PSIM Yogyakarta at the Mandala Krida Stadium.

== Honours ==
=== Club ===
Pro Duta

- Indonesian Premier League: 2013
