= Puja Abdillah =

Indonesian footballer (born 1996)

Personal information
- Full name: Puja Abdillah
- Date of birth: 27 November 1996 (age 29)
- Place of birth: Bandung, Indonesia
- Height: 1.70 m (5 ft 7 in)
- Position: Winger

Youth career
- Persib Bandung

Senior career*
Years	Team	Apps	(Gls)
2017–2022	Persib Bandung	4	(0)
2019–2020	→ Bandung United (loan)	11	(1)
2022	Persikab Bandung	3	(0)
2023	PSCS Cilacap	2	(0)
- * Club domestic league appearances and goals as of 14 October 2023

Puja Abdillah (born 27 November 1996) is an Indonesian professional footballer who plays as a winger.

== Club career ==
=== Persib Bandung ===
He made his professional debut in the Liga 1 on 15 July 2017, against Mitra Kukar where he played as a substitute.

==== Bandung United (loan) ====
He was signed for Bandung United to play in the Liga 2 in the 2019 season, on loan from Persib Bandung. He made 11 league appearances and scored 1 goal for Bandung United.

=== Persikab Bandung ===
On 18 June 2022, it was announced that Puja would be joining Persikab Bandung for the 2022-23 Liga 2 campaign. He made his league debut on 18 August 2022 in a match against PSIM Yogyakarta at the Si Jalak Harupat Stadium, Soreang.
