= Imam Arief Fadillah =

Indonesian professional footballer

Personal information
- Full name: Imam Arief Fadillah
- Date of birth: 14 December 1989 (age 36)
- Place of birth: Tasikmalaya, Indonesia
- Height: 1.80 m (5 ft 11 in)
- Position: Goalkeeper

Youth career
- 2009: Persib Bandung

Senior career*
| Years | Team | Apps | (Gls) |
| 2010 | Persib Bandung | 2 | (0) |
| 2011–2012 | Persitara Jakarta Utara | 9 | (0) |
| 2013 | PS Bangka | 15 | (0) |
| 2014 | Persika Karawang | 11 | (0) |
| 2015 | Cilegon United | 0 | (0) |
| 2016 | PS Barito Putera | 10 | (0) |
| 2017–2018 | Persib Bandung | 0 | (0) |
| 2018 | → PSM Makassar (loan) | 2 | (0) |
| 2019 | Persebaya Surabaya | 1 | (0) |
| 2020 | Sriwijaya | 1 | (0) |
| 2021 | PSIM Yogyakarta | 13 | (0) |
| 2022 | Persela Lamongan | 6 | (0) |
| 2023 | Perserang Serang | 6 | (0) |
| 2023–2024 | Persikabo 1973 | 2 | (0) |
| 2024 | Persikota Tangerang | 6 | (0) |
| 2025 | Persijap Jepara | 0 | (0) |
- * Club domestic league appearances and goals as of 19 October 2024

Imam Arief Fadillah (born 14 December 1989) is an Indonesian former footballer who plays as a goalkeeper.

== Club career ==
=== Persitara Jakarta Utara ===
Fadillah joined Persitara Jakarta Utara, part of the 2011–12 Indonesian Premier Division in the 2011/2012 season.

=== PS Bangka ===
In 2013, he moved to Bangka Belitung, playing for PS Bangka. In a match against PSMS Medan, Fadillah snatched the ball from an opponent attacker. PS Bangka remained firm until the game ended.

=== Persika Karawang ===
He played for West Java club Persika Karawang. He was in the starting line-up in nine of ten games.

=== PS Barito Putera ===
In 2016, Fadillah joined the Banjarmasin club, PS Barito Putera, in the 2016 Indonesia Soccer Championship A.

=== Persib Bandung ===
In 2017, he returned to Persib Bandung for the Liga 1. He said, "Bandung is heaven for me. Back to Persib is certainly a dream come true. Initially, I didn't believe it. Because Arema F.C. Always call me. But eventually there was a call from Persib, yes this is my dream,"

==== PSM Makassar (loan) ====
In 2018, Imam Arief joined Liga 1 club PSM Makassar, on loan from Persib Bandung. He made his debut on 5 August 2018 in a match against Perseru Serui at the Andi Mattalatta Stadium, Makassar.

=== Persebaya Surabaya ===
He was signed for Persebaya Surabaya to play in Liga 1 in the 2019 season. Imam Arief made his league debut on 9 November 2019 in a match against TIRA-Persikabo at the Pakansari Stadium, Cibinong.

=== Sriwijaya FC ===
He was signed for Sriwijaya to play in Liga 2 in the 2020 season. This season was suspended on 27 March 2020 due to the COVID-19 pandemic. The season was abandoned and was declared void on 20 January 2021.

=== PSIM Yogyakarta ===
In 2021, Imam Arief signed a contract with Indonesian Liga 2 club PSIM Yogyakarta. He made his league debut on 12 October in a 0–0 draw against Persis Solo at the Manahan Stadium, Surakarta.

=== Persela Lamongan ===
Imam was signed for Persela Lamongan to play in Liga 2 in the 2022–23 season.

== Honours ==
=== Club ===
PSM Makassar

- Liga 1 runner-up: 2018

Persebaya Surabaya

- Liga 1 runner-up: 2019
- Indonesia President's Cup runner-up: 2019

Persijap Jepara

- Liga 2 Promotion play-offs: 2024–25

=== Individual ===
- Liga 2 Best XI: 2021
