= Febri Hariyadi =

Indonesian footballer (born 1996)

Personal information
- Full name: Febri Hariyadi
- Date of birth: 19 February 1996 (age 30)
- Place of birth: Bandung, Indonesia
- Height: 1.68 m (5 ft 6 in)
- Position: Winger

Team information
- Current team: Persib Bandung
- Number: 13

Youth career
- 2010–2015: Persib Bandung

Senior career*
Years	Team	Apps	(Gls)
2016–	Persib Bandung	158	(23)
2026	→ Persis Solo (loan)	1	(0)

International career
2014	Indonesia U19	1	(0)
2017–2018	Indonesia U23	21	(2)
2017–2019	Indonesia	15	(0)
Medal record
Men's football
Representing Indonesia
Southeast Asian Games
Bronze medal – third place	2017 Kuala Lumpur	Team
- * Club domestic league appearances and goals as of 21 February 2026

Febri Hariyadi (born 19 February 1996) is an Indonesian professional footballer who plays as a winger for Super League club Persis Solo, on loan from Persib Bandung.

== Club career ==
=== Persib Bandung ===
Febri started his professional career at Persib Bandung in 2016. He made his debut with Persib Bandung on 30 April 2016, against Sriwijaya in 2016 Indonesia Soccer Championship A. He signed in during the 78th minute to substitute Samsul Arif.

== International career ==
He made his international debut on 21 March 2017, against Myanmar.

== Career statistics ==
=== Club ===
As of 21 February 2026

Club	Season	League		Cup (Note: Includes Piala Indonesia)		Continental		Other (Note: Appearances Indonesia President's Cup)		Total	
Club	Season	Apps	Goals	Apps	Goals	Apps	Goals	Apps	Goals	Apps	Goals
Persib Bandung	2016	13	3	2	0	–		0	0	13	3
Persib Bandung	2017	21	4	–				7	1	28	5
Persib Bandung	2018	17	1	7	1	–		1	0	25	2
Persib Bandung	2019	28	9	0	0	–		–		28	9
Persib Bandung	2020	3	0	0	0	–		–		3	0
Persib Bandung	2021–22	30	2	0	0	–		7 (Note: Appearances in Menpora Cup)	0	37	2
Persib Bandung	2022–23	19	1	0	0	–		4	0	23	1
Persib Bandung	2023–24	14	2	0	0	–		0	0	14	2
Persib Bandung	2024–25	4	0	0	0	–		0	0	4	0
Persib Bandung	2025–26	8	1	0	0	–		0	0	8	1
Persis Solo (loan)	2025–26	1	0	0	0	–		0	0	1	0
Career Total		159	23	9	1	–		19	1	185	25

=== International ===
As of match played 15 June 2019

Appearances and goals by national team and year
National team	Year	Apps	Goals
Indonesia	2017	5	0
Indonesia	2018	7	0
Indonesia	2019	3	0
Total		15	0

=== International under-23 goals ===
#	Date	Venue	Opponent	Score	Result	Competition
1.	24 August 2017	Shah Alam Stadium, Shah Alam, Malaysia	Cambodia	2–0	2–0	2017 SEA Games
2.	21 March 2018	Jalan Besar Stadium, Kallang, Singapore	Singapore	1–0	3–0	Friendly Match

== Style of play ==
Febri is known by his speed, pace and great dribbling ability. Many people in Indonesia dubbed him as "the next Eka Ramdani".

== Honours ==
=== Club ===
Persib Bandung

- Liga 1: 2023–24, 2024–25

=== International ===
Indonesia U-23

- SEA Games bronze medal: 2017

Indonesia

- Aceh World Solidarity Cup runner-up: 2017

=== Individual ===
- Indonesia President's Cup Best Young Player: 2017
- Liga 1 Team of the Season: 2019 (Substitutes)
- Persib Bandung Goal of the Year 2021–22
