= Ardi Idrus =

Indonesian footballer

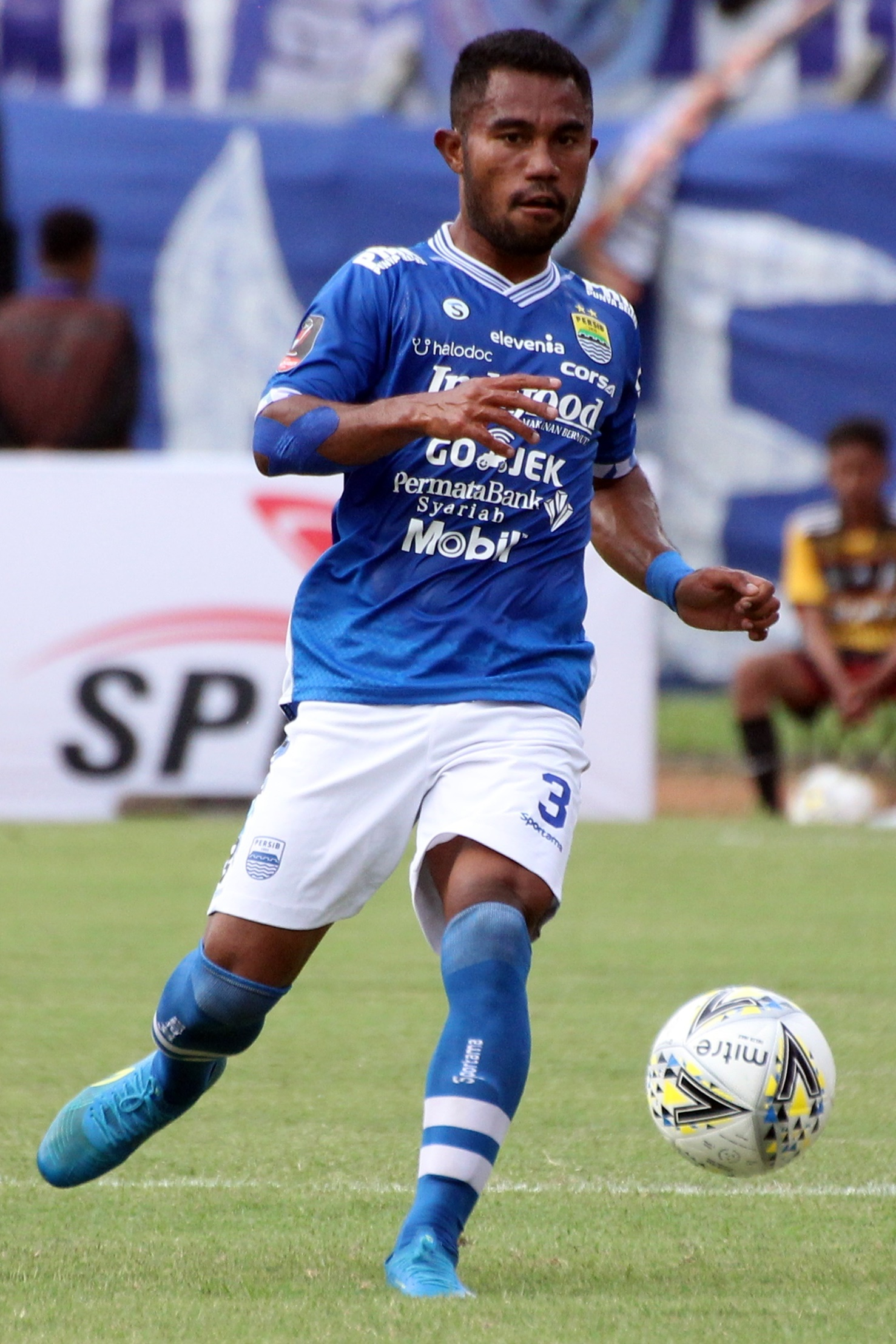
- Idrus with Persib Bandung in 2018

Personal information
- Full name: Ardi Idrus
- Date of birth: 22 January 1993 (age 33)
- Place of birth: Ternate, Indonesia
- Height: 1.65 m (5 ft 5 in)
- Position: Full-back

Team information
- Current team: Madura United
- Number: 33

Youth career
- PSM Makassar

Senior career*
Years	Team	Apps	(Gls)
2011	Perssin Sinjai	10	(0)
2012–2013	PSPS Pekanbaru	0	(0)
2014	Persitara North Jakarta	9	(0)
2015	Persiram Raja Ampat	0	(0)
2016	Persepam Madura Utama	14	(2)
2017	Kalteng Putra	4	(0)
2017	PSS Sleman	11	(2)
2018–2022	Persib Bandung	88	(0)
2022–2025	Bali United	50	(0)
2024–2025	→ Persebaya Surabaya (loan)	28	(0)
2025–2026	Bhayangkara Presisi	7	(0)
2026	→ Borneo Samarinda (loan)	6	(0)
2026–	Madura United	1	(0)
- * Club domestic league appearances and goals as of 6 September 2026

Ardi Idrus (born 22 January 1993) is an Indonesian professional footballer who plays as a full-back for Super League club Madura United.

== Club career ==
=== Persib Bandung ===
He was signed for Persib Bandung to play in Liga 1 in the 2018 season. Idrus made his league debut on 8 April 2018 in a match against Mitra Kukar at the Gelora Bandung Lautan Api Stadium, Bandung.

=== Bali United ===
Idrus was signed for Bali United to play in Liga 1 in the 2022–23 season. He made his league debut on 23 August 2022 in a match against Persib Bandung at the Gelora Bandung Lautan Api Stadium, Bandung.

=== Persebaya Surabaya ===
Idrus was signed for Persebaya Surabaya on loan from Bali United for the 2024/2025 Liga 1 season.

=== Bhayangkara Presisi ===
On 27 June 2025, Idrus officially signed Bhayangkara Presisi.

== Career statistics ==
=== Club ===
As of match played 6 September 2026

Club	Season	League			Cup (Note: Includes Piala Indonesia.)		Continental (Note: Includes AFC Cup and AFC Champions League.)		Other (Note: Appearances in Indonesia President's Cup)		Total	
Club	Season	Division	Apps	Goals	Apps	Goals	Apps	Goals	Apps	Goals	Apps	Goals
Persib Bandung	2018	Liga 1	29	0	0	0	0	0	0	0	29	0
Persib Bandung	2019	Liga 1	31	0	4	0	0	0	3	0	38	0
Persib Bandung	2020	Liga 1	3	0	0	0	0	0	0	0	3	0
Persib Bandung	2021–22	Liga 1	25	0	0	0	0	0	7 (Note: Appearances in Menpora Cup)	0	32	0
Persib Bandung	Total		88	0	4	0	0	0	10	0	102	0
Bali United	2022–23	Liga 1	21	0	0	0	0	0	1	0	22	0
Bali United	2023–24	Liga 1	29	0	0	0	5	0	0	0	34	0
Bali United	Total		50	0	0	0	5	0	1	0	56	0
Persebaya Surabaya (loan)	2024–25	Liga 1	28	0	0	0	0	0	0	0	28	0
Bhayangkara Presisi	2025–26	Super League	7	0	0	0	–		0	0	7	0
Borneo Samarinda (loan)	2025–26	Super League	6	0	0	0	–		0	0	6	0
Madura United	2026–27	Super League	1	0	0	0	–		0	0	1	0
Career total			180	0	4	0	4	0	11	0	199	0

== Honours ==
Individual

- Liga 1 Best XI: 2018
