= Atep Rizal =

Indonesian footballer

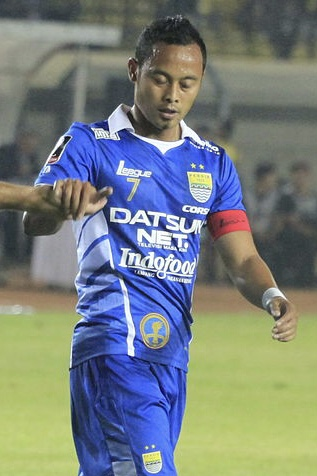
- Atep playing for Persib in 2015

Personal information
- Full name: Atep Ahmad Rizal
- Date of birth: 5 June 1985 (age 41)
- Place of birth: Cianjur, Indonesia
- Height: 1.69 m (5 ft 7 in)
- Position: Winger

Youth career
- UNI Bandung
- 2002–2004: Persib Bandung

Senior career*
Years	Team	Apps	(Gls)
2004–2008	Persija Jakarta	53	(14)
2008–2018	Persib Bandung	227	(30)
2019	Mitra Kukar	19	(1)
2020	PSKC Cimahi	1	(0)
2021	Muba Babel United	3	(0)
2022	Persika 1951	0	(0)
Total		303	(45)

International career
2004	Indonesia U19	7	(2)
2005–2007	Indonesia U23	6	(0)
2006–2007	Indonesia	10	(2)
- * Club domestic league appearances and goals

Atep Ahmad Rizal (born 5 June 1985 in Cianjur, West Java), simply known as Atep, is an Indonesian former footballer who last played as a winger for Liga 3 club Persika 1951.

== Club career ==
=== Persija Jakarta ===
In 2004, Atep was signed by Persija Jakarta after a fairly good season with Persiba Bantul. It did not take long for him to get a place in the first team. His remarkable achievements with Persija opened wide opportunities for his international career. In 2005, he was called up to the Indonesian national team in the AFF Cup and scored once. His excellent performance at Persija attracted many clubs to sign him, including Persib Bandung who were in talks of bringing him in for the 2008 season. He stayed at Persija until the end of the 2007 season.

=== Persib Bandung ===
In 2008, Persib Bandung finally managed to sign Atep, after failing to get it in the previous season. Although his arrival was greeted so positively by Bobotoh, he did not get so many chances to play early in the season so many predicted that he would leave in the transfer season at the break of the competition. But he survived and his end began to get a chance to play even though only as a backup player. On 6 May 2009, he scored his first league goal in a 2–1 defeat to Pelita Jaya. the In 2014 season Atep became a hero for Persib after scoring a spectacular goal against Arema Cronus that sent Persib to the final against Persipura. The following season's league start was postponed, which cleared the way for Persib to compete in the AFC Cup before the league began. There, Atep scored in every match they played.

Atep left Persib at the end of the 2018 Liga 1, after playing for the club for 10 years.

=== Mitra Kukar ===
Upon his release from Persib at the end of the 2018 season, Atep joined recently relegated side Mitra Kukar.

=== PSKC and Muba Babel ===
In 2020, Atep signed for PSKC Cimahi. After the 2020 season was declared void, he transferred to Muba Babel United the following year and made his league debut on 6 October in an away match against Sriwijaya.

== Style of play ==
Atep was known for his dribbling abilities and his influences on the pitch that made him Persib captain in many occasions before passing the captaincy to Supardi Nasir in 2018. He is regarded as an icon for Bobotoh or the supporters of Persib, with the nickname "Lord Atep". When he scored, Bobotoh performed push-ups as an appreciation mark.

== International career ==
=== International goals ===
No.	Date	Venue	Opponent	Score	Result	Competition
1.	13 January 2007	National Stadium, Kallang, Singapore	Laos	1–1	3–1	2007 AFF Championship
2.	13 January 2007	National Stadium, Kallang, Singapore	Laos	3–1	3–1	2007 AFF Championship

== Honours ==
Persib U-21

- Soeratin Cup:?
- PSSI U-20 Championship runner-up: 2003

Persib Bandung

- Indonesia Super League: 2014
- Piala Presiden: 2015

== Filmography ==
- Hari Ini Pasti Menang (2013)
