= Persib Bandung U-19 =

Indonesian football club

- Full name: Persatuan Sepak Bola Indonesia Bandung; U-19
- Nickname: Maung Ngora (The Young Tigers)
- Ground: Si Jalak Harupat Stadium
- Coach: Gilang Fauzi Ramdani
Home colours	Away colours	Third colours

Persib Bandung U-18 is an Indonesian football team in Bandung, West Java, Indonesia. They are the reserve team from Persib Bandung. Their most common nickname is Maung Ngora (The Young Tigers).

They were runners-up in the 2017 Liga 1 U-19 after losing to Persipura Jayapura U-19 1–0 in the final. They won the title on 26 November 2018 after defeating Persija Jakarta U-19 1–0 in the final.

== Honours ==
- Liga 1 U-19
  - Winners (1): 2018
  - Runners-up (1): 2017
- Soeratin Cup
  - Winners (2): 2003, 2006
