= Indra Mustafa =

Indonesian footballer (born 1999)

Personal information
- Full name: Indra Mustafa
- Date of birth: 28 June 1999 (age 27)
- Place of birth: Bogor, Indonesia
- Height: 1.73 m (5 ft 8 in)
- Position: Defender

Youth career
- 2015–2017: Persib Bandung

Senior career*
Years	Team	Apps	(Gls)
2018–2021	Persib Bandung	17	(0)
2020	→ Bandung United (loan)	0	(0)
2022–2023	Borneo	0	(0)
2023	Nusantara United	0	(0)
2024–2025	Persikab Bandung	0	(0)
2025	PSB Bogor	5	(1)
2026	Sriwijaya	2	(0)

International career^{‡}
2018	Indonesia U19	2	(0)
- * Club domestic league appearances and goals as of 29 January 2026 ‡ National team caps and goals as of 8 December 2018

Indra Mustafa (born 28 June 1999) is an Indonesian professional footballer who plays as a defender.

== Club career ==
=== Persib Bandung ===
He was signed for Persib Bandung to play in Liga 1 in the 2018 season. Mustafa made his professional debut on 8 April 2018 in a match against Mitra Kukar at the Gelora Bandung Lautan Api Stadium, Bandung.

=== Borneo Samarinda ===
Mustafa was signed for Borneo Samarinda to play in Liga 1 in the 2022–23 season.

== International career ==
In 2018, Mustafa represented the Indonesia U-19, in the 2018 AFC U-19 Championship.

== Career statistics ==
=== Club ===
As of 29 January 2026.

Club	Season	League			Cup (Note: Includes Piala Indonesia.)		Continental		Other		Total	
Club	Season	Division	Apps	Goals	Apps	Goals	Apps	Goals	Apps	Goals	Apps	Goals
Persib Bandung	2018	Liga 1	10	0	0	0	–		0	0	10	0
Persib Bandung	2019	Liga 1	6	0	4	0	–		0	0	10	0
Persib Bandung	2021–22	Liga 1	1	0	0	0	–		0	0	1	0
Persib Bandung	Total		17	0	4	0	–		0	0	21	0
Bandung United (loan)	2020	Liga 3	0	0	0	0	–		0	0	0	0
Borneo	2022–23	Liga 1	0	0	0	0	–		0	0	0	0
Nusantara United	2023–24	Liga 2	0	0	0	0	—		0	0	0	0
Persikab Bandung	2024–25	Liga Nusantara	0	0	0	0	—		0	0	0	0
PSB Bogor	2025–26	Liga 4	5	0	0	0	—		0	0	5	0
Sriwijaya	2025–26	Championship	2	0	0	0	—		0	0	2	0
Career total			24	0	4	0	0	0	0	0	28	0
