= Shohei Matsunaga =

Japanese footballer

Personal information
- Full name: Shohei Matsunaga
- Date of birth: 7 January 1989 (age 37)
- Place of birth: Mishima, Shizuoka, Japan
- Height: 1.71 m (5 ft 7 1/2 in)
- Position: Midfielder

Youth career
- 2007: Schalke 04

Senior career*
Years	Team	Apps	(Gls)
2008–2009	FC Schalke 04 II	17	(1)
2010	Ehime	2	(0)
2011	Persib Bandung	13	(3)
2011–2012	Persiba Balikpapan	33	(7)
2012–2016	Gresik United	46	(12)
2016	Persiba Balikpapan	33	(13)
2017	Persib Bandung	32	(3)
2018	Persela Lamongan	16	(4)
2018–2019	PSMS Medan	15	(10)
2019	PSIS Semarang	12	(1)
Total		220	(54)
- * Club domestic league appearances and goals

Shohei Matsunaga (松永 祥兵, Matsunaga Shohei; born 7 January 1989) is a Japanese former football player who played as a midfielder. He was called Samurai Matsunaga by his fans because of his samurai-like playing spirit.
