= Bojan Mališić =

Serbian footballer

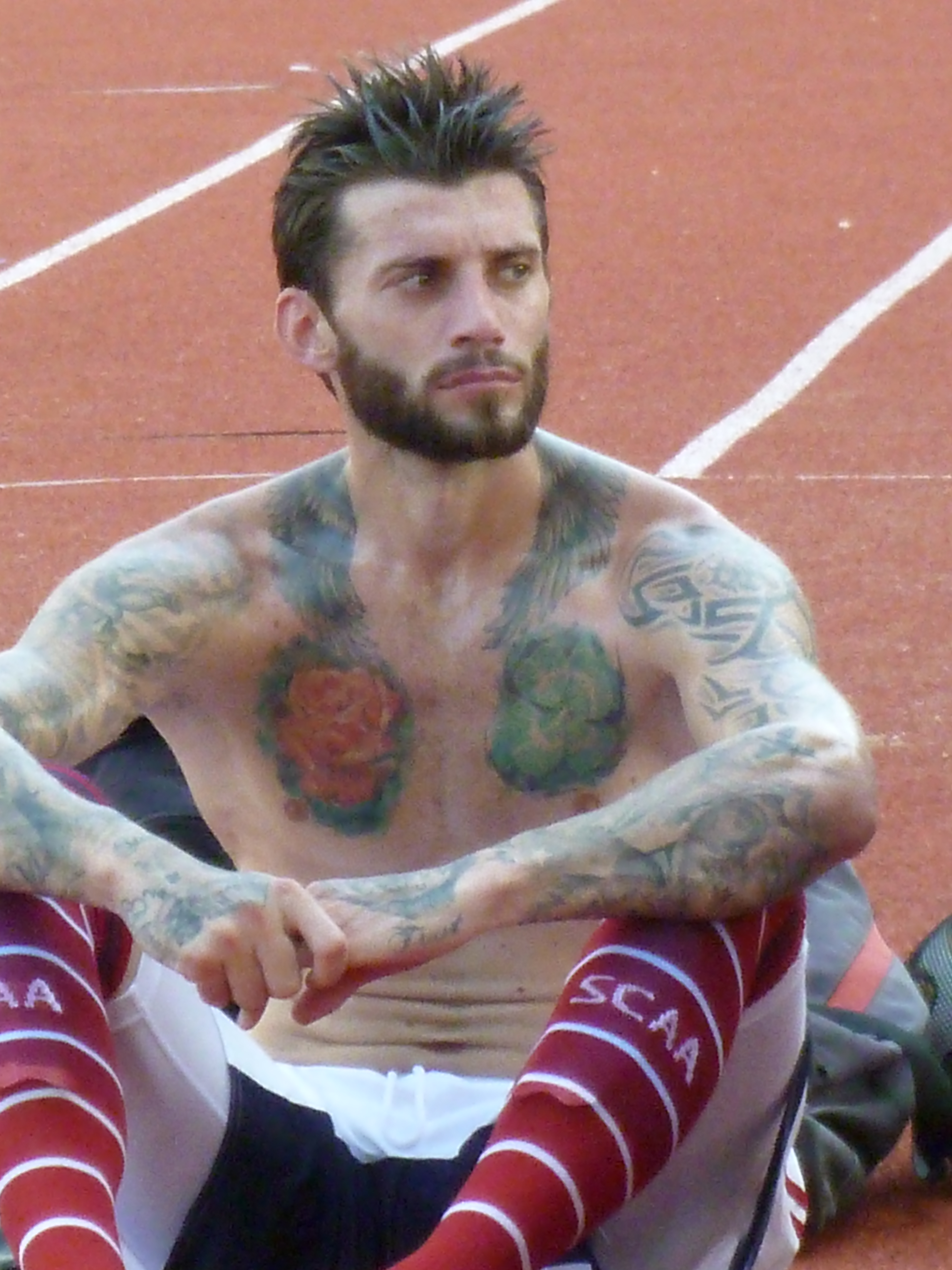
- Mališić with South China in 2014

Personal information
- Full name: Bojan Mališić
- Date of birth: 14 January 1984 (age 42)
- Place of birth: Kragujevac, SFR Yugoslavia
- Height: 1.85 m (6 ft 1 in)
- Position: Centre back

Senior career*
Years	Team	Apps	(Gls)
2002–2004	Radnički Kragujevac	112	(3)
2007–2010	Rad	33	(0)
2010–2011	Javor Ivanjica	15	(0)
2011–2012	Nasaf Qarshi	33	(0)
2012–2013	Hoverla Uzhhorod	23	(1)
2014–2017	South China	44	(1)
2017–2018	Davao Aguilas	12	(4)
2018–2019	Persib Bandung	40	(3)
2019	Badak Lampung	16	(0)
2021	Sinđelić Beograd		
- * Club domestic league appearances and goals

Bojan Mališić (Serbian Cyrillic: Бојан Малишић; born 14 January 1984) is a Serbian former footballer who played as a centre back.

== Career ==
Mališić started out at his hometown side Radnički Kragujevac, before moving to Rad in the summer of 2007. He spent three seasons with the Građevinari, before switching to Javor Ivanjica.

In early 2011, Mališić moved abroad to Uzbekistan and joined Nasaf Qarshi. He helped the club win the AFC Cup later that year.

In July 2012, Mališić signed with Ukrainian Premier League side Hoverla Uzhhorod. He made 23 league appearances and scored one goal in the 2012–13 season.

In 2014, Mališić returned to Asia and joined Hong Kong Premier League club South China. He moved to Philippines Football League side Davao Aguilas in 2017.

Ahead of the 2018 season, Mališić signed to play for Indonesian club Persib Bandung.

== Honours ==
=== Club ===
Nasaf Qarshi

- AFC Cup: 2011

=== Individual ===
- Hong Kong Top Footballer Awards: Most Favourite Player (2014–15)
- Hong Kong Top Footballer Awards: Hong Kong Top Footballers (2014–15, 2015–16)
