= Mochammad Sabillah =

Indonesian association footballer

Personal information
- Full name: Mochammad Al Amin Syukur Fisabillah
- Date of birth: 10 May 1994 (age 32)
- Place of birth: Bontang, Indonesia
- Height: 1.82 m (6 ft 0 in)
- Position: Centre-back

Youth career
- Diklat Mandau
- 2013: Bontang
- 2014: PS PU Putra

Senior career*
Years	Team	Apps	(Gls)
2016	Persekap Pasuruan	10	(0)
2016–2017	Persijap Jepara	5	(0)
2017	Persibat Batang	6	(0)
2018–2019	Persib Bandung	9	(0)
2019	Badak Lampung	0	(0)
2019	→ PSIM Yogyakarta (loan)	4	(0)
2020	Kalteng Putra	1	(1)
2021–2023	Persik Kediri	28	(0)
2021	→ PSMS Medan (loan)	9	(0)
2023	PSIS Semarang	1	(0)
2023–2024	Bhayangkara	1	(0)
2025	Persipa Pati	9	(0)
- * Club domestic league appearances and goals as of 25 February 2025

Mochammad Al Amin Syukur Fisabillah (born 10 May 1994 in Bontang) is an Indonesian professional footballer who plays as a centre-back.

== Club career ==
=== Kalteng Putra ===
He was signed for Kalteng Putra to play in Liga 2 in the 2020 season. Despite the 2020 season being canceled after one match due to the COVID-19 pandemic.

=== Persik Kediri ===
In 2021, Sabil signed a contract with Liga 1 club Persik Kediri. He made his league debut on 14 January 2022 against Persikabo 1973 at the Ngurah Rai Stadium, Denpasar.

==== PSMS Medan (loan) ====
In 2021, Sabil signed a contract with Liga 2 club PSMS Medan, on loan from Persik Kediri. He made his league debut on 7 October 2021 against KS Tiga Naga at the Gelora Sriwijaya Stadium, Palembang.

==== PSIS Semarang ====
In 2023, Sabil signed a contract with Liga 1 club PSIS Semarang. He made his league debut on 14 August 2023 against Dewa United at the Indomilk Arena, Tangerang Regency.
