= Agung Mulyadi =

Indonesian footballer

Personal information
- Full name: Agung Mulyadi
- Date of birth: 23 March 1997 (age 29)
- Place of birth: Bandung, Indonesia
- Height: 1.74 m (5 ft 9 in)
- Position: Midfielder

Youth career
- Diklat Persib
- Persib Bandung

Senior career*
Years	Team	Apps	(Gls)
2017–2022	Persib Bandung	15	(0)
2019–2020	→ Bandung United (loan)	9	(1)
2021	→ Bandung United (loan)	14	(3)
2022–2023	Persikabo 1973	8	(1)
2023–2024	Sada Sumut	13	(1)
- * Club domestic league appearances and goals as of 23:11, 6 February 2024

Agung Mulyadi (born 23 March 1997) is an Indonesian professional footballer who last played as a midfielder for Sada Sumut.

== Club career ==
=== Persib Bandung ===
He made his professional debut in the Liga 1 on May 7, 2017, against Persipura Jayapura.

==== Bandung United (loan) ====
He was signed for Bandung United to play in the Liga 2 in the 2019 season, on loan from Persib Bandung. He made 9 league appearances and scored 1 goal for Bandung United.

=== Persikabo 1973 ===
Mulyadi was signed for Persikabo 1973 to play in Liga 1 in the 2022–23 season. He made his league debut on 3 September 2022 in a match against Borneo Samarinda at the Pakansari Stadium, Cibinong.
