= Oh In-kyun =

South Korean footballer

Oh In-Kyun
Personal information
- Full name: Oh In-Kyun
- Date of birth: 29 January 1985 (age 41)
- Place of birth: Seoul, South Korea
- Height: 1.76 m (5 ft 9 in)
- Position: Midfielder

Senior career*
Years	Team	Apps	(Gls)
2007–2008	Chungju Hummel	21	(6)
2008–2009	Yesan FC	14	(4)
2009–2010	Balestier Khalsa	15	(7)
2010−2011	PS Bengkulu	20	(4)
2011–2012	PSMS Medan	14	(0)
2013	Persela Lamongan	35	(4)
2016	Gresik United	25	(4)
2017	Mitra Kukar	30	(3)
2018–2019	Persib Bandung	27	(3)
2019–2020	Persipura Jayapura	30	(0)
2020	Arema	3	(0)
Total		234	(35)
- * Club domestic league appearances and goals

Oh In-Kyun (born 29 January 1985) is a South Korean former professional footballer as a midfielder.
