= Hariono =

Indonesian footballer

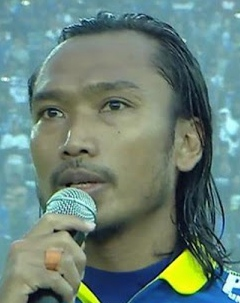
- Hariono addressing his farewell to Persib supporters at the Si Jalak Harupat Stadium in 2019

Personal information
- Full name: Hariono
- Date of birth: 2 October 1985 (age 41)
- Place of birth: Sidoarjo, Indonesia
- Height: 1.70 m (5 ft 7 in)
- Position: Defensive midfielder

Team information
- Current team: Deltras
- Number: 14

Youth career
- Deltras Sidoarjo

Senior career*
Years	Team	Apps	(Gls)
2003–2004	Persida Sidoarjo	30	(0)
2004–2008	Deltras Sidoarjo	119	(2)
2008–2019	Persib Bandung	239	(1)
2020–2023	Bali United	26	(0)
2023–2024	PSIM Yogyakarta	17	(0)
2024–	Deltras	17	(0)

International career
2008–2015	Indonesia	22	(1)
Medal record
Men's football
Representing Indonesia
Indonesia Independence Cup
Winner	2008 Indonesia
- * Club domestic league appearances and goals as of 23:41, 29 September 2025 (UTC)

Hariono (born 2 October 1985) is an Indonesian professional footballer who plays as a defensive midfielder for Championship club Deltras. He has made more than 200 official appearances in the highest level of Indonesian football.

== Club career ==
Hariono started his professional career at his hometown club Persida Sidoarjo in 2003. He left for another Sidoarjo club, Deltras in 2004, which at that time were playing in the Indonesian Premier Division.

=== Persib Bandung ===
In the 2008-09 season, he was brought to Persib Bandung by his former coach at Deltras, Jaya Hartono, who also moved from Deltras. He made his official Persib debut on 30 July 2008 in a match against Persela Lamongan, coming on for Suwita Patha in the second half. He was part of the squad that won the 2014 Indonesia Super League. He scored his first goal for Persib in a match against Perseru Serui in the 2016 Indonesia Soccer Championship A, although the competition was not officially recognised by FIFA as PSSI was being suspended at the time of the event. He eventually scored another goal in his farewell match for Persib on 22 December 2019 against PSM Makassar at 67th minute from a penalty kick, which would be his "official" competitive league goal for the club.

He has never received a straight red card at Persib, although he was sent off after being shown yellow cards twice; first on 11 October 2009 during a match against Persiba Balikpapan and on 5 February 2014 against Persita Tangerang. At the 2015 Indonesia President's Cup in the 2nd leg semi-final against Mitra Kukar, he kicked Carlos Sciucatti and was sent off. However, the decision was overturned and he was able to play in the final match against Sriwijaya F.C., which Persib won.

It was announced that Hariono would leave Persib in the end of 2019 season, having served for the club for 11 years. The club decided not to renew his contract and furthermore, coach Robert Alberts spoke to media that the squad needed regeneration, which would take Hariono's place in the squad. In his farewell speech, Hariono admitted that he was out of the coach's plan but he gave in to the decision and expressed his hopes to rejoin and eventually retire at the club.

Hariono will also have his squad number 24 retired temporarily (it would be brought out of retirement should he rejoin the club in the future) as confirmed by Persib Director Teddy Tjahyono.

=== Bali United ===
On 28 December 2019, Hariono signed for Bali United. Hariono made his debut for Bali United as a substitute for Brwa Nouri in a 5–3 win against Tampines Rovers in the 2020 AFC Champions League qualifying play-offs. This season was suspended on 27 March 2020 due to the COVID-19 pandemic and was abandoned and declared void on 20 January 2021.

=== Return to Deltras ===
He rejoined Deltras after 16 years away in 2024. In 2026, he was appointed player-assistant coach, and he has acquired AFC B Licence.

== Personal life ==
Hariono is mononymous and has no surname. Prior to his football career, he once worked as a porter at a local convenience store in Surabaya.

On 12 October 2014, Hariono married a policewoman, Fianita Kusuma Wati.

== Career statistics ==
Seasons	Club	League	League		Cup (Note: Includes Piala Indonesia.)		Continental		Total	
Seasons	Club	League	Apps	Goals	Apps	Goals	Apps	Goals	Apps	Goals
2009–2010	Persib Bandung	Indonesian Super League	30	0	-	-	-	-	30	0
2010–2011	Persib Bandung	Indonesian Super League	27	0	-	-	-	-	27	0
2011–2012	Persib Bandung	Indonesian Super League	25	0	-	-	-	-	25	0
2013	Persib Bandung	Indonesian Super League	31	0	-	-	-	-	31	0
2014	Persib Bandung	Indonesian Super League	22	0	5	0	-	-	27	0
2015	Persib Bandung	Indonesian Super League	2	0	6	0	5 (Note: Appearances in AFC Cup.)	0	13	0
2016	Persib Bandung	Indonesia Soccer Championship A	32	1	-	-	-	-	32	1
2017	Persib Bandung	Liga 1	26	0	-	-	-	-	26	0
2018	Persib Bandung	Liga 1	22	0	4	0	-	-	26	0
2019	Persib Bandung	Liga 1	21	1	-	-	-	-	21	1
2020	Bali United	Liga 1	1	0	-	-	1 (Note: Appearances in AFC Champions League.)	0	2	0
2021	Bali United	Liga 1	16	0	-	-	0	0	16	0
2022	Bali United	Liga 1	9	0	-	-	0	0	9	0
2023-24	PSIM Yogyakarta	Liga 2	17	0	-	-	0	0	17	0
2024-25	Deltras	Liga 2	14	0	-	-	0	0	14	0
2025-26	Deltras	Liga 2	3	0	-	-	0	0	3	0
Career Total			298	2	15	0	6	0	319	2

=== International goals ===
Hariono: International goals
No.	Date	Venue	Opponent	Score	Result	Competition
1	22 August 2011	Manahan Stadium, Surakarta, Indonesia	Palestine	1–1	4–1	Friendly

== Honours ==
=== Club ===
Persib Bandung

- Indonesia Super League: 2014
- Indonesia President's Cup: 2015

Bali United

- Liga 1: 2021–22

=== International ===
Indonesia

- Indonesian Independence Cup: 2008
