= Deden Natshir =

Indonesian footballer

Personal information
- Full name: Muhammad Natshir Fadhil Mahbuby
- Date of birth: 13 February 1993 (age 33)
- Place of birth: Bandung, Indonesia
- Height: 1.82 m (6 ft 0 in)
- Position: Goalkeeper

Team information
- Current team: PSMS Medan
- Number: 1

Youth career
- 2006–2008: Persib Bandung
- 2008–2011: Pelita Jaya

Senior career*
Years	Team	Apps	(Gls)
2011–2012	Pelita Jaya	0	(0)
2013	Arema Cronus	0	(0)
2014–2022	Persib Bandung	75	(0)
2022–2026	Dewa United	31	(0)
2026–	PSMS Medan	1	(0)

International career
2015	Indonesia U23	8	(0)
- * Club domestic league appearances and goals as of 23:19, 13 September 2026 (UTC)

Muhammad Natshir Fadhil Mahbuby (born 13 February 1993), simply known as Deden is an Indonesian professional footballer who plays as a goalkeeper for Championship club PSMS Medan.

== International career ==
In 2015, he made his debut for the Indonesia U-23, starting in a 1–0 win against Malaysia U-23. He then was part of the team prepared for 2016 AFC U-23 Championship qualification and 2015 Southeast Asian Games, playing in two friendly matches. He played three times in the 2016 AFC U-23 Championship qualification. He played one time in the 2015 Southeast Asian Games.

== Career statistics ==
=== Club ===
As of match played 13 September 2026

Club	Season	League		Cup (Note: Includes Piala Indonesia)		Continental (Note: Appearances in AFC Cup)		Other (Note: Appearances in Indonesia President's Cup)		Total	
Club	Season	Apps	Goals	Apps	Goals	Apps	Goals	Apps	Goals	Apps	Goals
Pelita Jaya	2011–12	0	0	0	0	0	0	0	0	0	0
Arema	2013	0	0	0	0	0	0	0	0	0	0
Persib Bandung	2014	0	0	0	0	0	0	0	0	0	0
Persib Bandung	2015	0	0	0	0	1	0	1	0	2	0
Persib Bandung	2016	15	0	0	0	0	0	0	0	15	0
Persib Bandung	2017	23	0	0	0	0	0	2	0	25	0
Persib Bandung	2018	26	0	0	0	0	0	3	0	29	0
Persib Bandung	2019	3	0	4	0	0	0	3	0	10	0
Persib Bandung	2020	0	0	0	0	0	0	0	0	0	0
Persib Bandung	2021–22	8	0	0	0	0	0	0	0	8	0
Persib Bandung	Total	75	0	4	0	1	0	9	0	89	0
Dewa United	2022–23	30	0	0	0	0	0	2	0	32	0
Dewa United	2023–24	1	0	0	0	–		0	0	1	0
Dewa United	2024–25	0	0	0	0	–		0	0	0	0
Dewa United	2025–26	0	0	0	0	–		0	0	0	0
Dewa United	Total	31	0	0	0	1	0	0	0	33	0
PSMS Medan	2026–27	1	0	0	0	0	0	0	0	1	0
Career total		107	0	4	0	1	0	11	0	123	0

== Honours ==
=== Club ===
Pelita Jaya U–21

- Indonesia Super League U-21: 2008–09

Persib Bandung

- Indonesia Super League: 2014
- Indonesia President's Cup: 2015
