= Eka Ramdani =

Indonesian footballer (born 1984)

Personal information
- Full name: Eka Ramdani
- Date of birth: 18 June 1984 (age 42)
- Place of birth: Purwakarta, Indonesia
- Height: 1.67 m (5 ft 6 in)
- Position: Midfielder

Youth career
- PS UNI

Senior career*
Years	Team	Apps	(Gls)
2002–2003	Persib Bandung	20	(0)
2003–2004	Persijatim	20	(4)
2005–2011	Persib Bandung	135	(25)
2011–2012	Persisam Putra Samarinda	30	(4)
2012–2013	Pelita Bandung Raya	32	(1)
2013–2016	Semen Padang	54	(2)
2016–2017	Sriwijaya	17	(1)
2017	Persela Lamongan	26	(1)
2017–2018	Persib Bandung	14	(0)
Total		297	(38)

International career
2000	Indonesia U16		
2001–2003	Indonesia U19		
2002	Indonesia U21		
2003–2007	Indonesia U23		
2006–2011	Indonesia	24	(1)
- * Club domestic league appearances and goals

Eka Ramdani (born 18 June 1984), also known as Ebol, is an Indonesian former professional footballer who last played for Persib Bandung.

== International career ==
His unofficial international debut in Golkar birthday when the Indonesia national football team drew 2–2 with South Africa at Gelora Bung Karno Stadium. His official international debut with the national team was in the 2006 Merdeka Tournament when they drew 1–1 against Malaysia on 23 August 2006.

== International goals ==
Eka Ramdani: International goals
No.	Date	Venue	Opponent	Score	Result	Competition
1	3 November 2009	Singapore National Stadium, Kallang, Singapore	Singapore	1–1	1–3	Friendly

== Honours ==
Indonesia U-21

- Hassanal Bolkiah Trophy: 2002

Indonesia

- Indonesian Independence Cup: 2008
- AFF Championship runner-up: 2010
