= Achmad Jufriyanto =

Indonesian footballer (born 1987)

Personal information
- Full name: Achmad Jufriyanto Tohir
- Date of birth: 7 February 1987 (age 39)
- Place of birth: Tangerang, Indonesia
- Height: 5 ft 11 in (1.80 m)
- Position: Centre-back

Senior career*
Years	Team	Apps	(Gls)
2005–2008	Persita Tangerang	52	(2)
2008–2009	Arema Malang	18	(0)
2009–2010	Pelita Jaya	26	(0)
2010–2013	Sriwijaya	67	(6)
2013–2015	Persib Bandung	29	(2)
2016	Sriwijaya	25	(1)
2017–2018	Persib Bandung	31	(2)
2018–2019	Kuala Lumpur	17	(0)
2019–2026	Persib Bandung	72	(3)
2020–2021	→ Bhayangkara (loan)	3	(0)
Total		340	(14)

International career
2005	Indonesia U19	5	(0)
2008	Indonesia U21	4	(0)
2007–2014	Indonesia U23	9	(1)
2013–2019	Indonesia	19	(2)

Managerial career
- 2026–: Persib Bandung (Assistant coach)
- * Club domestic league appearances and goals as of 24 May 2025

Achmad Jufriyanto Tohir (born 7 February 1987 in Tangerang, Banten), commonly known as Jupe, is an Indonesian professional footballer who plays as a centre-back and assistant coach for Super League club Persib Bandung. he played for the Indonesia national team.

== Career statistics ==
=== Club ===
As of match played 24 May 2025

Club	Season	League		Cup (Note: Includes Malaysia FA Cup)		Asia (Note: Appearances in AFC Champions League) (Note: Appearances in AFC Cup)		Other (Note: Appearances in Indonesia President's Cup)		Total	
Club	Season	Apps	Goals	Apps	Goals	Apps	Goals	Apps	Goals	Apps	Goals
Arema Malang	2008–09	18	0	0	0	0	0	0	0	18	0
Pelita Jaya	2009–10	26	0	0	0	0	0	0	0	26	0
Sriwijaya	2010–11	13	1	0	0	6	0	0	0	19	1
Sriwijaya	2011–12	27	2	0	0	0	0	0	0	27	2
Sriwijaya	2013	27	3	0	0	0	0	0	0	27	3
Sriwijaya	Total	67	6	0	0	6	0	0	0	73	6
Persib Bandung	2014	27	2	0	0	0	0	0	0	27	2
Persib Bandung	2015	2	0	0	0	6	1	6	1	14	2
Persib Bandung	Total	29	2	0	0	6	1	6	1	41	4
Sriwijaya	2016	25	1	0	0	0	0	0	0	25	1
Persib Bandung	2017	31	2	0	0	0	0	6	0	37	2
Kuala Lumpur	2018	17	0	4	0	0	0	0	0	21	0
Persib Bandung	2019	26	2	0	0	0	0	0	0	26	2
Persib Bandung	2021–22	17	0	0	0	0	0	4 (Note: Appearances in Menpora Cup)	0	21	0
Persib Bandung	2022–23	24	1	0	0	–		4	0	28	1
Persib Bandung	2023–24	3	0	0	0	–		0	0	3	0
Persib Bandung	2024–25	2	0	0	0	–		0	0	2	0
Bhayangkara (loan)	2020	3	0	0	0	0	0	0	0	3	0
Career total		288	14	4	0	12	1	20	1	324	16

=== International goals ===
Scores and results list Indonesia's goal tally first.

#	Date	Venue	Opponent	Score	Result	Competition
1.	1 November 2013	Jakarta, Gelora Bung Karno Stadium, Indonesia	Kyrgyzstan	4–0	4–0	Friendly
2.	21 June 2014	Sidoarjo, Gelora Delta Stadium, Indonesia	Pakistan	2–0	4–0	Friendly

== Honours ==
=== Club ===
Sriwijaya

- Indonesia Super League: 2011–12
- Indonesian Community Shield: 2010
- Indonesian Inter Island Cup (2): 2010, 2012

Persib Bandung

- Indonesia Super League/Liga 1 (4): 2014, 2023–24, 2024–25, 2025–26
- Indonesia President's Cup: 2015
