= Supardi Nasir =

Indonesian footballer

Personal information
- Full name: Supardi Nasir Bujang
- Date of birth: 9 April 1983 (age 43)
- Place of birth: Bangka, Indonesia
- Height: 1.73 m (5 ft 8 in)
- Position: Full-back

Team information
- Current team: Pekanbaru (head coach)

Senior career*
Years	Team	Apps	(Gls)
2002–2004	PS Palembang	18	(0)
2004–2006	PSPS Pekanbaru	20	(0)
2006–2008	PSMS Medan	52	(3)
2008–2010	Pelita Jaya	33	(1)
2010–2012	Sriwijaya	59	(4)
2013–2016	Persib Bandung	61	(2)
2016	Sriwijaya	33	(1)
2017–2022	Persib Bandung	100	(3)
2022	PSMS Medan	1	(0)
2023–2024	PSPS Riau	14	(0)
2024–2025	Nusantara United	20	(2)
2025	Pekanbaru	0	(0)
Total		411	(16)

International career
2007–2014	Indonesia	21	(0)

Managerial career
- 2025–2026: Pekanbaru (assistant coach)
- 2026–: Pekanbaru
- * Club domestic league appearances and goals as of 15 February 2025

Supardi Nasir Bujang (born 9 April 1983) is an Indonesian professional football coach and former player who is currently the head coach at Pekanbaru. He debuted on the Indonesia national team as a substitute at the 2007 AFF Championship.

== Personal life ==
Nasir is a Muslim who observes the Islamic month of Ramadan.

== Career statistics ==
=== Club ===
As of match played 15 February 2025

Seasons	Club	League		Cup		Continental		Other		Total	
Seasons	Club	Apps	Goals	Apps	Goals	Apps	Goals	Apps	Goals	Apps	Goals
2009–2010	Pelita Jaya	33	1	-	-	-	-	-	-	33	1
2010–2011	Sriwijaya	27	3	-	-	1	0	-	-	28	3
2011–2012	Sriwijaya	32	1	-	-	-	-	-	-	32	1
2013	Persib Bandung	33	2	-	-	-	-	-	-	33	2
2014	Persib Bandung	28	0			-	-	7	0	35	0
2015	Persib Bandung	0	0	0	0	1	0	6	0	7	0
2016	Sriwijaya	33	1	-	-	-	-	-	-	33	1
2017	Persib Bandung	25	0	-	-	-	-	7	0	32	0
2018	Persib Bandung	27	3	-	-	-	-	3	0	30	3
2019	Persib Bandung	31	0	2	1	-	-	-	-	33	1
2020	Persib Bandung	3	0	0	0	-	-	-	-	3	0
2021	Persib Bandung	14	0	0	0	-	-	4	0	18	0
2022–23	PSMS Medan	1	0	-	-	-	-	0	0	1	0
2023–24	PSPS Riau	14	0	-	-	-	-	0	0	14	0
2024–25	Nusantara United	20	2	-	-	-	-	0	0	20	2
2025–26	Pekanbaru	0	0	-	-	-	-	0	0	0	0
Career Total		321	13	2	1	2	0	27	0	352	14

== Honours ==
PSMS Medan

- Liga Indonesia Premier Division runner up: 2007–08

Sriwijaya

- Indonesia Super League: 2011–12
- Indonesian Community Shield: 2010
- Indonesian Inter Island Cup: 2010

Persib Bandung

- Indonesia Super League: 2014
- President's Cup: 2015
