= Henhen Herdiana =

Indonesian footballer

Personal information
- Full name: Henhen Herdiana
- Date of birth: 10 September 1995 (age 31)
- Place of birth: Bandung, Indonesia
- Height: 1.69 m (5 ft 7 in)
- Position: Right-back

Team information
- Current team: PSM Makassar (on loan from Persib Bandung)
- Number: 27

Youth career
- 2011–2014: SSB Bareti Ciater
- 2014–2017: Persib Bandung

Senior career*
Years	Team	Apps	(Gls)
2017–	Persib Bandung	128	(1)
2023	→ Dewa United (loan)	14	(0)
2025–2026	→ Persik Kediri (loan)	10	(0)
2026–	→ PSM Makassar (loan)	5	(0)
- * Club domestic league appearances and goals as of 16 October 2026

Henhen Herdiana (born 10 September 1995) is an Indonesian professional footballer who plays as a right-back for Super League club PSM Makassar, on loan from Persib Bandung.

== Club career ==
=== Early career ===
Henhen is a footballer from Subang, West Java. He started his junior football career with joined Bareti Ciater soccer school. On 2014, Henhen joined Diklat Persib.

On 2016, Henhen joined PON Football Team of West Java, and managed to get a gold medal at the football branch 2016 Pekan Olahraga Nasional in West Java.

=== Persib Bandung ===
He made his professional debut in the Liga 1 on 15 April 2017 against Persib.

=== Dewa United ===
Henhen on loan Dewa United Liga 1.

== Career statistics ==
=== Club ===
As of match played 7 February 2026

Club	Season	League			Cup (Note: Includes Piala Indonesia.)		Continental (Note: Appearances in AFC Champions League Two)		Total	
Club	Season	Division	Apps	Goals	Apps	Goals	Apps	Goals	Apps	Goals
Persib Bandung	2017	Liga 1	22	0	0	0	0	0	22	0
Persib Bandung	2018	Liga 1	11	0	0	0	0	0	11	0
Persib Bandung	2019	Liga 1	11	0	2	0	0	0	13	0
Persib Bandung	2020	Liga 1	0	0	0	0	0	0	0	0
Persib Bandung	2021–22	Liga 1	25	0	0	0	0	0	25	0
Persib Bandung	2022–23	Liga 1	20	1	0	0	0	0	20	1
Persib Bandung	2023–24	Liga 1	17	0	0	0	0	0	17	0
Persib Bandung	2024–25	Liga 1	21	0	0	0	4	0	25	0
Persib Bandung	2025–26	Super League	1	0	0	0	0	0	1	0
Persib Bandung	Total		128	1	2	0	4	0	134	1
Dewa United (loan)	2023–24	Liga 1	14	0	0	0	0	0	14	0
Persik Kediri (loan)	2025–26	Super League	10	0	0	0	0	0	10	0
Career total			149	1	2	0	4	0	155	1

== Honours ==
Persib Bandung

- Liga 1: 2023–24, 2024–25
