= 2014 Persib Bandung season =

Indonesian football club season

Persib Bandung
2014 season
- Owner: PT. Persib Bandung Bermartabat
- CEO: Glenn Sugita
- Head coach: Djadjang Nurdjaman
- Stadium: Si Jalak Harupat Stadium
- Indonesia Super League: Champions
- Top goalscorer: League: Makan Konaté (13); All: Makan Konaté (13)
- Highest home attendance: 27,500 vs. Mitra Kukar (26 October 2014)
- Lowest home attendance: 10,542 vs. Persita (5 February 2014)
Home colours	Away colours	Third colours

The 2014 season was the 55th season in the history of Persib Bandung, the club's 19th consecutive season in the top-flight of Indonesian football since it became fully professional, and the sixth season competing in the Indonesia Super League.

Persib became the champion of the 2014 Indonesia Super League and Ferdinand Sinaga was rewarded the best player award.

== Review and events ==
=== Pre-2014 ===
==== September ====
2013 Persib Bandung season ends after Persib's failure to qualify in the final round of 2013 Menpora Cup.

After a coaching evaluation meeting on 27 September 2013, PT PBB declared that head coach Djadjang Nurdjaman will still lead the team for at least a season at the 2014 Indonesia Super League.

==== October ====
Persib evaluated their coaching staff. The results are the declaration on 17 October 2013 which appointed Jaino Matos as match analyst, extending Anwar Sanusi's contract as goalkeeper coach, extending Asep Sumantri's contracts and replacing Sutiono Lamso with Herrie Setyawan as assistant coaches, as well as appointing a psychologist for the team.

Persib then released seven players from previous season's squad, four of them are the foreign players. Those are two Bandung players Cecep Supriatna and Aang Suparman, long-time player Airlangga Sutjipto, centre-back Abanda Herman, and midfielder Mbida Messi, Kenji Adachihara and Hilton Moreira. Following their departure are goalkeeper Rizky Bagja and midfielder Asri Akbar, who left to get more playing time.

On 6 October 2013, Persib recruited two Sriwijaya FC players, Tantan and Achmad Jufriyanto. Persib also recruited two ex-Persib Junior players. Those are Persisam Samarinda player, Ferdinand Sinaga on 16 October 2013, and Arema Indonesia player, Muhammad Natshir on 29 October 2013.

==== November ====
On 1 November 2013, long-time player Maman Abdurrahman stated that he will leave Persib due to private issues. Persib then proceeded to release another defender, Naser Al Sebai on 8 November 2013 due to the competition's new regulation of foreign players.

Also on 1 November 2013, Persib recruited two Malian players from PS Barito Putera, midfielder Makan Konaté and striker Djibril Coulibaly. Another Sriwijaya FC player, Abdul Rahman Sulaiman, was recruited by Persib on 23 November 2013 to cover Maman Abdurrahman's leave. Persib also recruited two out of the proposed three intern players, which are Rudiyana and Syaeful Anwar. On 3 November 2013, Persib officially recruited Persebaya Surabaya midfielder, Muhammad Taufiq.

Brazilian defender Gesio Carvalho is recruited by Persib to follow a trial from 2 November 2013 until 9 November 2013. He ended up not recruited by Persib.

Persib started to perfect the team by running some friendly matches. Two friendly matches were done in November. The first one was a 1–1 draw with Persib Bandung U-21 in Jalak Harupat Soreang Stadium on 9 November 2013. Persib's goal was scored by top-scorer Sergio van Dijk. The second friendly match was a 6–0 win against Persikab Kabupaten Bandung in Galuh Stadium. This friendly was a part of their training center in Ciamis. Four of Persib's goals were scored by van Dijk, while the other two were scored by two new recruits, Konaté and Jufriyanto.

Persib Bandung finished all 20 players' contracts on 29 November 2013. Four players still have contracts from the previous season, which are Sergio van Dijk, Jajang Sukmara, Tony Sucipto, and Atep. Four players were given two years contracts, which are Ferdinand Sinaga, Muhammad Taufiq, Shahar Ginanjar, and Muhammad Natshir. The other twelve players were given one year contracts.

==== December ====
On 8 December 2013, Persib's manager Umuh Muchtar stated that Persib's top-scorer Sergio van Dijk will leave the club due to unsatisfying contract fee.

On 11 December 2013, Persib contracted Montenegrin defender Vladimir Vujović for a year long contract.

Persib Bandung continued to perfect the team by running more friendly matches. Four friendly matches were done in December 2013. The first one was a 2–2 draw against Premier Division team PSGC Galuh Ciamis still in a part of the training center in Ciamis. The two goals were scored by Konaté and Abdul Rahman. However, the match was stopped at the 70th minute due to overcrowd. Persib run their second friendly against the US Major League Soccer team D.C. United as a part of their Indonesian Tour. The result were a 2–1 win for Persib with Konaté and Firman Utina scored each a goal. The third friendly match was a 3–1 win against Porda Purwakarta in PPI Field. Two goals were scored by Coulibaly, while the other one by Atep. The last friendly match on December was a big 9–1 win against Benfica Karawang. Muhammad Ridwan and Coulibaly scored each two goals. The other five goals were scored by Konaté, Atep, Vujović, Sinaga, and Utina.

Persib was invited by East Java Football Association to join 2013 East Java Tournament as an invitee team along with Sriwijaya FC and PSM Makassar. Persib joined the tournament and grouped with Persepam Madura United and Persebaya Surabaya, playing in Bangkalan. In the first game against Persepam, Persib won 2–1. The goals were scored by Coulibaly and Supardi. In the second game, Persib lost 0–1 against Persebaya. Persib failed to continue to the semi-finals as the best runner-up was achieved by Persela Lamongan. On 25 December 2013, Persib was offered to join 2013 Piala Sultan in Banjarmasin, but on 27 December 2013, Persib declined the offer.

On 23 December 2013, PSSI announced that the 2014 Indonesia Super League will be divided into two groups. Persib was drawn into the Western Group, consisting of Arema Cronous, Barito Putera, Gresik United, Pelita Bandung Raya, Persija Jakarta, Persijap Jepara, Persik Kediri, Persita Tangerang, Semen Padang, Sriwijaya FC, and Persib Bandung.

=== January ===
Persib continued to perfect the team by running more friendly matches. The first match was a big 9–0 win against Persib Bandung U-21. Sinaga and Konaté scored each two goals, while the other five was scored by Jufriyanto, Tantan, Sigit Hermawan, Rudiyana, and Taufiq. The second friendly match of the month was a 7–1 win against Porda Kabupaten Bandung. Sinaga scored a hattrick, Konaté scored two goals, and the other two goals were scored by Utina and Rudiyana. The last friendly before the ISL was a 4–0 win against Thai Raj Pracha. Two goals were scored by Tantan, and the other two were scored by Rudiyana and Konaté.

On 5 January 2014, manager Umuh Muchtar had agreed for Persib to contract the three intern players to be played in the 2014 Indonesia Super League. The three players are Rudiyana, Syaeful Anwar and Rudi Gunawan. Manager Umuh Muchtar also stated that Persib might extend Makan Konaté's contract to three years due to his good performances in the pre-season matches.

On 16 January 2014, Persib released the Malian striker Djibril Coulibaly due to his injury causing bad performances in pre-season matches. Djibril Coulibaly is replaced by a Nigerian striker Udo Fortune on the same day. However, Fortune was released by Persib on 23 January 2014 due to disappointing performances in the Inter Island Cup. After running trials for Liberian striker, Roberto Kwateh and Émile Mbamba, Persib decided to recall Djibril Coulibaly on 31 January 2014.

After continuing the partnership with League for the apparel, Persib gained new partnership on 12 January 2014 with PT MASA, a local tire company, and their products, Corsa Motorcycle Tire and Achilles Radial.

On 1 January 2014, Persib was appointed by PT Liga Indonesia to be the host for the Group Java 1 in the 2014 Indonesian Inter Island Cup qualification, whereas only the group winner will be advanced to the final round. Persib Bandung was grouped with Persita Tangerang, Persijap Jepara, and Pelita Bandung Raya. Group 1 will play in Jalak Harupat Soreang Stadium from 13 to 16 January 2014. On the first matchday against Persita, Persib won 7–1. Atep, who had only played from 71st minute, scored a hattrick. The other four goals were scored by Jufriyanto, Coulibaly, Utina and Konaté. On the second matchday, Persib continues to get a win from Persijap. Persib won 2–0 with goals scored by Ridwan and Sinaga. On the last matchday, Persib won 1–0 in the Derby van Java against Pelita Bandung Raya. The only goal was scored by Jufriyanto. The match was rained with yellow cards as each sides received four yellow cards. Persib then advanced to the final round, grouped with Persik Kediri, Mitra Kukar, and Persiram Raja Ampat. The group played the game in Manahan Stadium, Surakarta from 19 to 22 January 2014. On the first matchday of Group B, Persib had a goalless draw with Persiram. On the second matchday against Mitra Kukar, Persib gets a 1–1 draw. Striker Udo Fortune scored his only goal for Persib in the season. On the last matchday, Persib defeated Persik 3–2. Left behind 2 goals, Persib strikes with three goals each by Konaté, Sinaga and Ridwan. With this win, Persib advances to the final against Group A winner, Arema Cronous. However, the finals that was supposed to be held on 25 January 2014 in Sidoarjo, was postponed because the police didn't give permission, concerning the vicious rivalries between the club's supporters.

=== February ===
On 2 February 2014, Persib won their first ISL match after defeating Sriwijaya 1–0 in Jalak Harupat Stadium. Konaté scored the winning goal by a penalty. Persib won again after defeating Persita Tangerang 2–1 on 5 February 2014. Left 0–1, Sinaga scored equalizer goal, while Konaté scored the winning goal by a penalty again. Their first away game on 9 February 2014 ended up as a 1–1 draw against Persijap Jepara. Persib's goal was an own goal by Persijap's defender Catur Rintang. The fourth matchday on 12 February 2014 resulted in Persib defeating Persik Kediri in their home with a 3–0 win. Persib's goal was scored by Jufriyanto, Coulibaly, and Atep. Persib received their first loss at their home on 16 February 2014 by Semen Padang with score 1–2. Persib's only goal was scored by Coulibaly.

On 13 February 2014, Persib officially contract the intern player, Rudiyana for a year-long contract. Persib continues to fill their foreign player quota by running a trial for Australian striker Jacob Colosimo on 14 February 2014. He ended up not recruited by Persib. Persib then runs a trial for Saudi Arabian striker Fahad Al-Dossari from 19 to 22 February 2014, but ended up not recruiting him. On 26 February 2014, Persib runs a trial for South Korean striker Han Dong-Won. Persib then decided not to have any additional foreign player after releasing Han.

Persib runs a friendly match against local football team, IM UD Rahayu due to the cancellation of Persib-Persija match that was scheduled to take place on 22 February 2014. Persib won 8–0 with Hermawan and Rudiyana scored two goals, while Abdul Rahman, Tantan, Atep and Coulibaly each scored a goal.

=== March ===
Seven Persib players were called to represent the Indonesia national football team for a match against Saudi Arabia on the 2015 AFC Asian Cup qualification and the first phase of the 2014 AFF Suzuki Cup training camp on Alzira, Valencia, Spain. Those players are Made, Supardi, Jufriyanto, Utina, Ridwan, Sinaga and Tantan.

Persib was planning to run a friendly match against Malaysia Super League team T–Team F.C. on 1 March 2014 to fill the empty dates due to 2015 AFC Asian Cup qualification. But after rescheduled to 3 March 2014 due to T–Team's unpreparedness, the game is cancelled due to Persib's unpreparedness. Replacing this game is a match against local team, UNI. Persib won 10–0, with three goals by Rudiyana, two goals each by Konaté and Coulibaly. The other three goals were scored by Tantan, Jajang, and Vujović. Their second friendly of the month on 26 March 2014 resulted in a 5–0 win against Pelita Bandung Raya U-21. Two goals were scored by Rudiyana, and three others by Atep, Agung and Konaté. The team won another friendly match on 29 March 2014 against local team PS Setia with 4–1 score. Two goals were scored by Atep, and the other two by Sigit And Rudiyana.

On their only ISL match in March, Persib won 2–0 against PS Barito Putera on their ground. The two goals were scored by the ex-Barito, Djibril Coulibaly.

=== April ===
On 2 April 2014, Persib run a friendly that ended up as a 3–3 draw against First Division team, Persibat Batang. Two goals and one goal were scored by Rudiyana and Agung, respectively. Then, from 3 to 5 April 2014, Persib held a training center at Pangandaran. There, they played a friendly against local players under the name Pangandaran Selection. Seven goals were scored by Konaté while the other two scored by Taufiq and Agung.

On 8 April 2014, Persib was visited by Gamba Osaka representatives to check the Jalak Harupat Stadium's worthiness as they would visit Indonesia for a friendly match in June 2014.

On 10 April 2014, Polda Jabar initiated a reconciliation to avoid unnecessary future clashes of Persib and Persija's rivalry. This meeting concluded with six agreements that will be the ground rule if one or both sides broke the agreements on future dates.

On the first April matchday on 13 April 2014, Persib dramatically won 3–2 against Arema Cronus. The goals were scored by Coulibaly, Utina, and Konaté. On 20 April 2014, Persib won 4–1 in Gresik. Two goals were scored by Sinaga, while the other two by Ridwan and Atep. The match was postponed for 15 minutes due to flares lit by the supporters. On the next match, Persib lost 1–0 at the Bandung Derby to Pelita Bandung Raya on 27 April 2014.

=== May ===
On 4 May 2014, Persib run a friendly match against local team Bone FC, which ended up as a 9–0 win for them. Four goals were made by Coulibaly, two goals each by Atep and Rudiyana, and a goal by Tantan. Then on 14 May 2014, Persib played a friendly against 2013–14 Eredivisie champions, AFC Ajax as a part of their 2014 Indonesian Tour. The game resulted in a 1–1 draw with Konaté scored Persib's lone goal.

Persib had a goalless draw against Persija Jakarta on their last game of the ISL first round on 8 May 2014. This game marks the 9th draw on the Old Indonesia derby since the Liga Indonesia era. On the first match of the ISL second round, Persib had a 2–2 draw in the Bandung Derby against Pelita Bandung Raya on 20 May 2014. Tantan and Sinaga scored a goal each. They had another 2–2 draw against Arema Cronus on 25 May 2014 in Kanjuruhan. Striker Ferdinand Sinaga scored the goals. They received their first win in the second round against Gresik United with 4–1 score. Firman Utina, Makan Konaté, Ferdinand Sinaga, and Djibril Coulibaly scored each a goal.

Persib runs a trial for Japanese striker Atsushi Yonezawa on 27 May 2014.

=== June ===
On 2 June 2014, Persib decided not to add any players on the ISL second round after releasing Atsushi Yonezawa.

Persib runs a friendly against Persima Majalengka on 5 June 2014 which ended up as a 13–1 win. Two goals scored each by Coulibaly, Rudiyana and Sigit Hermawan, and the rest by Sinaga, Utina, Tantan, Vujović, Abdul Rahman, Jufriyanto, and Atep. However, their long-planned friendly against Gamba Osaka was canceled in honor of the presidential election.

Their last ISL game before the long break was a 3–1 win against Barito Putera on 10 June 2014 in Bandung. Makan Konaté scored two goals to his former club, with one additional goal by Ferdinand Sinaga.

Five Persib players were called up to the national team to international friendlies against Pakistan U-23 and Nepal, which are I Made Wirawan, Achmad Jufriyanto, Firman Utina, Hariono and Tantan.

=== July ===
On the first friendly on the long break, Persib won 3–0 to Bara Siliwangi FC in Pusdikpom Field. The game was played 40x2 minutes, with an own goal by Bara's defender and two goals each by Ridwan and Vujović. On the second friendly match, Persib won 9–0 in Pusdikpom Field against Benpica Karawang. Vujović scored a quattrick, three of them were penalty kicks, Coulibaly scored a hattrick and a goal each by Sigit and Atep.

Five Persib players were called back by the national team to a friendly against Qatar on 14 July 2014 in Doha. All of the previous players were called except for Tantan, who is replaced with Ferdinand Sinaga after his detention is lifted.

== Matches ==
=== Legend ===
Win Draw Loss Postponed

=== Friendlies ===
9 November 2013	Persib Bandung	1 – 1	Persib Bandung U-21	Bandung
	van Dijk 49'	Report	Sjahbani 88'	Stadium: Siliwangi Stadium

27 November 2013	Persikab Bandung	0 – 6	Persib Bandung	Ciamis
		Report	van Dijk 6', 28', 44', 54'; Konaté 20'; Jufriyanto 78'	Stadium: Galuh Stadium

1 December 2013	PSGC Galuh Ciamis	2 – 2	Persib Bandung	Ciamis
	Budiawan 2'; A. Budiawan 13'	Report	Konaté 15'; Abdul Rahman 81'	Stadium: Galuh Stadium

6 December 2013	Persib Bandung	2 – 1	(United States) D.C. United	Bandung
18:30	Konaté 38'; Firman 70'	Report	Seaton 20'	Stadium: Jalak Harupat Soreang Stadium

12 December 2013	Persib Bandung	3 – 1	Porda Purwakarta	Bandung
	Atep 25'; Coulibaly 46', 83'	Report	Sopian 20'	Stadium: PPI Stadium

15 December 2013 2013 East Java Tournament	Persepam Madura United	1 – 2	Persib Bandung	Bangkalan
15:00	N'Kong 87'	Report	Coulibaly 65'; Supardi 90+1'	Stadium: Gelora Bangkalan Stadium

19 December 2013 2013 East Java Tournament	Persebaya Surabaya	1 – 0	Persib Bandung	Bangkalan
15:00	Supriyatna 40'	Report		Stadium: Gelora Bangkalan Stadium; Referee: Jumdi Abdi

28 December 2013	Persib Bandung	9 – 1	Benfica Karawang	Bandung
8:30	Ridwan 6', 31'; Konaté 8'; Atep 23'; Vujović 26'; Sinaga 30'; Utina 44'; Coulibaly 71', 88'	Report	80'	Stadium: Siliwangi Stadium

4 January 2014	Persib Bandung	9 – 0	Persib Bandung U-21	Bandung
	Sinaga 24', 44'; Konaté 49', 69'; Jufriyanto 54'; Tantan 62'; Hermawan 77'; Rudiyana 79'; Taufiq 87'	Report		Stadium: Gelora Bandung Lautan Api Stadium

8 January 2014	Persib Bandung	7 – 1	Porda Kabupaten Bandung	Bandung
	Sinaga 3', 24', 86'; Utina 5'; Konaté 36', 40' (pen.); Rudiyana 76'	Report	Susanto 33'	Stadium: Pusdikpom Cimahi Stadium

13 January 2014 2014 IIC qual.	Persib Bandung	7 – 1	Persita Tangerang	Bandung
15:30	Jufriyanto 19'; Coulibaly 41'; Utina 57'; Konaté 73'; Atep 76', 87', 99'	Report	Adachihara 53'	Stadium: Jalak Harupat Soreang Stadium; Attendance: 15,643

14 January 2014 2014 IIC qual.	Persijap Jepara	0 – 2	Persib Bandung	Bandung
19:00		Report	Ridwan 50'; Sinaga 78'	Stadium: Jalak Harupat Soreang Stadium; Attendance: 22,876

16 January 2014 2014 IIC qual.	Persib Bandung	1 – 0	Pelita Bandung Raya	Bandung
19:00	Jufriyanto 68'	Report		Stadium: Jalak Harupat Soreang Stadium

19 January 2014 2014 Inter Island Cup	Persib Bandung	0 – 0	Persiram Raja Ampat	Surakarta
15:30		Report		Stadium: Manahan Stadium; Referee: Handri Kristanto

20 January 2014 2014 Inter Island Cup	Mitra Kukar	1 – 1	Persib Bandung	Surakarta
19:00	Weeks 85'	Report	Fortune 76'	Stadium: Manahan Stadium; Referee: Iwan Sukoco

22 January 2014 2014 Inter Island Cup	Persib Bandung	3 – 2	Persik Kediri	Surakarta
19:00	Konaté 42' (pen.); Sinaga 53'; Ridwan 86'	Report	Gumilang 25'; Aditama 29'	Stadium: Manahan Stadium; Referee: Suyanto

28 January 2014	Persib Bandung	4 – 0	(Thailand) Raj Pracha	Bandung
18:30	Rudiyana 61'; Konaté 65'; Tantan 75', 90'	Report		Stadium: Jalak Harupat Soreang Stadium

22 February 2014	Persib Bandung	8 – 0	IM UD Rahayu	Bandung
	Hermawan 6', 68'; Abdul Rahman 7'; Tantan 13'; Atep 34'; Rudiyana 47', 80'; Coulibaly 70'	Report		Stadium: Persib Stadium

4 March 2014	Persib Bandung	10 – 0	UNI	Bandung
	Tantan 13'; Coulibaly 19', 69'; Konaté 27', 30'; Jajang 63'; Rudiyana 70', 80', 88'; Vujović 84'	Report		Stadium: Persib Stadium

26 March 2014	Persib Bandung	5 – 0	Pelita Bandung Raya U-21	Bandung
	Atep 5'; Pribadi 33'; Konaté 35'; Rudiyana 46', 54'	Report		Stadium: Persib Stadium

29 March 2014	Persib Bandung	4 – 1	PS Setia	Bandung
	Sigit 33'; Rudiyana 53'; Atep 80', 82'	Report	Goal	Stadium: Siliwangi Stadium

2 April 2014	Persib Bandung	3 – 3	Persibat Batang	Bandung
	Rudiyana 35', 59'; Pribadi 68'	Report	Ardiansyah 44'; Hafidin 65'; Usman 78'	Stadium: Persib Stadium

5 April 2014	Pangandaran Selection	0 – 9	Persib Bandung	Pangandaran
		Report	Konaté 8', 17', 24', 31', 35', 38', 77'; Taufiq 34'; Pribadi 57'	Stadium: Cibenda Field

4 May 2014	Persib Bandung	9 – 0	Bone FC	Bandung
	Coulibaly 2', 33', 36', 47'; Tantan 4'; Atep 59', 75'; Rudiyana 63', 67'	Report		Stadium: Pusdikpom Field

14 May 2014	Persib Bandung	1 – 1	(Netherlands) AFC Ajax	Bandung
15:00	Konaté 45'	Report	Denswil 17'	Stadium: Jalak Harupat Soreang Stadium

5 June 2014	Persib Bandung	13 – 1	Persima Majalengka	Bandung
	Coulibaly 20', 49'; Sinaga 29'; Utina 30'; Tantan 52'; Vujović 56' (pen.); Rahman 63'; Rudiyana 67', 72'; Jufriyanto 76'; Hermawan 81', 88'; Atep 86'	Report	Didin 50'	Stadium: Progressive Football Stadium

12 July 2014	Persib Bandung	3 – 0	Bara Siliwangi	Bandung
	Azhari 8' (o.g.); Ridwan 59'; Vujović 64' (pen.)	Report		Stadium: Pusdikpom Field

16 July 2014	Persib Bandung	9 – 0	Benpica Karawang	Bandung
	Vujović 5' (pen.), 20' (pen.), 70' (pen.), 76'; Coulibaly 24', 48', 50'; Sigit 71'; Atep 79'	Report		Stadium: Pusdikpom Field

19 July 2014	PSGC Galuh Ciamis	1 – 2	Persib Bandung	Ciamis
	Somah 23'	Report	Sinaga 59'; Coulibaly 73'	Stadium: Galuh Stadium

23 July 2014	Persib Bandung	6 – 1	Bandung Barat FC	Cimahi
	Coulibaly 11', 21'; Tantan 25'; Vujović 35' (pen.); Atep 60'; Rudiyana 64'	Report	49'	Stadium: Pusdikpom Field

5 August 2014	Persib Bandung	6 – 0	Bina Putra Cirebon	Cimahi
	8' (o.g.); Tantan 39'; Coulibaly 49', 58'; Sinaga 73'; Sigit 75'	Report		Stadium: Pusdikpom Field

17 September 2014	Persib Bandung	3 – 1	Porda Kota Bandung	Bandung
	Atep 12', 30'; Coulibaly 64'	Report	Rizki Alam	Stadium: Progressive Football Stadium

20 September 2014	PSKC Cimahi	1 – 11	Persib Bandung	Cimahi
	Hamdani 83'	Report	Atep 12'; Konaté; Tantan; Coulibaly 70' 89'; Sukmara 90'	Stadium: Pusdikpom Field

24 September 2014	Persib Bandung	2 – 1	Porda Kabupaten Kuningan	Cimahi
	Coulibaly 61', 81'	Report	Krisna 71'	Stadium: Pusdikpom Field

2 October 2014	Persib Bandung	3 – 0	Malaysia Super League Selection	Bandung
	Konaté 34'; Sinaga 64'; Coulibaly 66'	Report		Stadium: Gelora Bandung Lautan Api Stadium

=== Indonesia Super League ===
==== First round ====
2 February 2014 1	Persib Bandung	1 – 0	Sriwijaya FC	Bandung
15:30	Konaté 82' (pen.)	Report		Stadium: Jalak Harupat Soreang Stadium; Attendance: 26,154; Referee: Iwan Sukoco

5 February 2014 2	Persib Bandung	2 – 1	Persita Tangerang	Bandung
15:30	Sinaga 76'; Konaté 90+4' (pen.)	Report	Arvani 72'	Stadium: Jalak Harupat Soreang Stadium; Attendance: 10,542; Referee: Novari Ikhsan Arilaha

9 February 2014 3	Persijap Jepara	1 – 1	Persib Bandung	Jepara
15:30	Claudinho 56'	Report	Catur 61' (o.g.)	Stadium: Gelora Bumi Kartini Stadium; Attendance: 6,200; Referee: Gerry Rama Prabowo

12 February 2014 4	Persik Kediri	0 – 3	Persib Bandung	Kediri
19:00		Report	Jufriyanto 54'; Coulibaly 80'; Atep 90+1'	Stadium: Brawijaya Stadium; Attendance: 14,678; Referee: Maulana Nugraha

16 February 2014 5	Persib Bandung	1 – 2	Semen Padang	Bandung
15:30	Coulibaly 90+3'	Report	Esteban 15'; Supardi 53' (o.g.)	Stadium: Jalak Harupat Soreang Stadium; Attendance: 19,869; Referee: Djumadi Effendi

9 March 2014 6	Barito Putera	0 – 2	Persib Bandung	Banjar
15:30		Report	Coulibaly 22', 62'	Stadium: Demang Lehman Stadium; Referee: Novari Ikhsan Arilaha

13 April 2014 7	Persib Bandung	3 – 2	Arema Cronus	Bandung
15:30	Coulibaly 52'; Utina 78'; Konaté 83'	Report	Arif 19'; López 41'	Stadium: Jalak Harupat Soreang Stadium; Attendance: 27,200; Referee: Maulana Nugraha

20 April 2014 8	Gresik United	1 – 4	Persib Bandung	Gresik
19:00	Matsunaga 71'	Report	Sinaga 5', 43'; Ridwan 58'; Atep 81'	Stadium: Petrokimia Stadium; Attendance: 12,300; Referee: Nusur Fadillah

27 April 2014 9	Pelita Bandung Raya	1 – 0	Persib Bandung	Bandung
15:30	Musafri 48'	Report		Stadium: Jalak Harupat Soreang Stadium; Attendance: 9,000; Referee: Prasetyo Hadi

8 May 2014 10	Persib Bandung	0 – 0	Persija Jakarta	Bandung
15:30		Report		Stadium: Jalak Harupat Soreang Stadium; Attendance: 26,978; Referee: Prasetyo Hadi

20 May 2014 11	Persib Bandung	2 – 2	Pelita Bandung Raya	Bandung
15:30	Tantan 33'; Sinaga 83'	Report	Wildansyah 45'; Kurniawan 70'	Stadium: Jalak Harupat Soreang Stadium; Attendance: 12,365; Referee: Handri Kristianto

25 May 2014 12	Arema Cronus	2 – 2	Persib Bandung	Malang
19:00	López 56', 68' (pen.)	Report	Sinaga 45', 46'	Stadium: Kanjuruhan; Attendance: 42,449; Referee: Suyanto

29 May 2014 13	Persib Bandung	4 – 1	Gresik United	Bandung
15:30	Utina 7'; Konaté 33' (pen.); Sinaga 68'; Coulibaly 87'	Report	Velázquez 35'	Stadium: Jalak Harupat Soreang Stadium; Attendance: 17,744; Referee: Novari Ikhsan Arilaha

10 June 2014 14	Persib Bandung	3 – 1	Barito Putera	Bandung
15:30	Konaté 40' (pen.), 47'; Sinaga 63'	Report	Mukminin 58'	Stadium: Jalak Harupat Soreang Stadium; Attendance: 10,653; Referee: Hamsir

10 August 2014 15	Persija Jakarta	0 – 0	Persib Bandung	Jakarta
15:30		Report		Stadium: Gelora Bung Karno Stadium; Attendance: 66,143; Referee: Handri Kristanto

15 August 2014 16	Semen Padang FC	3 – 1	Persib Bandung	Padang
19:00	Vizcarra 33', 68'; Iskandar 66'	Report	Rahman 45'	Stadium: Haji Agus Salim Stadium; Attendance: 8,723; Referee: Nusur Fadillah

19 August 2014 17	Persib Bandung	5 – 0	Persijap Jepara	Bandung
19:00	Evaldo 18' (o.g.); Coulibaly 46'; Vujović 55', 78'; Atep 87'	Report		Stadium: Jalak Harupat Soreang Stadium; Attendance: 9,350; Referee: Novari Ikhsan Arilaha

24 August 2014 18	Persib Bandung	3 – 0	Persik Kediri	Bandung
15:30	Vujović 67'; Sinaga 80'; Coulibaly 84'	Report		Stadium: Jalak Harupat Soreang Stadium; Attendance: 23,950; Referee: Hamsir

31 August 2014 19	Persita Tangerang	1 – 2	Persib Bandung	Bandung
15:30	Caesario 82'	Report	Vujović 18'; Konaté 23'	Stadium: Jalak Harupat Soreang Stadium; Attendance: 10,230; Referee: Najamuddin Aspiran

5 September 2014 20	Sriwijaya FC	2 – 3	Persib Bandung	Palembang
15:30	Sulaiman 34'; Ramadhana 87'	Report	Tantan 13'; Konaté 28'; Atep 84'	Stadium: Gelora Sriwijaya Stadium; Attendance: 2,148; Referee: Handri Kristianto

==== Second round ====
6 October 2014 1	Persib Bandung	1 – 0	Pelita Bandung Raya	Bandung
15:30	Jufriyanto 54'	Report		Stadium: Jalak Harupat Soreang Stadium; Attendance: 13,500; Referee: Hadiyana

10 October 2014 2	Mitra Kukar F.C.	2 – 3	Persib Bandung	Tenggarong
19:00	Epandi 33'; Weeks 77'	Report	Konaté 19'; Atep 28'; Sinaga 73'	Stadium: Aji Imbut Stadium; Attendance: 3,518; Referee: Novari Ikhsan Arilaha

14 October 2014 3	Persebaya Surabaya	1 – 1	Persib Bandung	Surabaya
15:30	Nasir 75' (o.g.)	Report	Konaté 11'	Stadium: Gelora Bung Tomo Stadium; Attendance: 8,768; Referee: Gerry Rama Prabowo

22 October 2014 4	Persib Bandung	3 – 1	Persebaya Surabaya	Bandung
15:30	Konaté 71', 83'; Sinaga 90'	Report	Kenmogne 90+2'	Stadium: Jalak Harupat Soreang Stadium; Referee: Novari Ikhsan Arilaha

26 October 2014 5	Persib Bandung	2 – 1	Mitra Kukar	Bandung
15:30	Utina 72'; Vujović 90+3'	Report	Epandi 66'	Stadium: Jalak Harupat Soreang Stadium; Attendance: 27,500; Referee: Samsir Ali

30 October 2014 6	Pelita Bandung Raya	2 – 1	Persib Bandung	Bandung
15:30	Kim Kurniawan 52'; Febrianto 79'	Report	Pamungkas 82' (o.g.)	Stadium: Jalak Harupat Soreang Stadium; Attendance: 13,500; Referee: Dodi Setia Purnama

==== Knockout stage ====
4 November 2014 Semifinal	Persib Bandung	3 – 1 (a.e.t.)	Arema Cronus	Palembang
19:00	Vujovic 84'; Atep 91'; Konate 112'	Report	Beto 46'	Stadium: Gelora Sriwijaya Stadium; Attendance: 10,325; Referee: Handri Kristanto

7 November 2014 Final	Persipura Jayapura	2 – 2 (a.e.t.) (3–5 p)	Persib Bandung	Palembang
18:30	Ian Kabes 5'; Solossa 79'	Report	Wanggai 45+1' (o.g.); Ridwan 52'	Stadium: Gelora Sriwijaya Stadium; Referee: Prasetyo Hadi
	Penalties
	Solossa (penalty scored); Pahabol (penalty scored); Robertino (penalty scored); Alom (penalty missed)		(penalty scored) Konate; (penalty scored) Sinaga; (penalty scored) Tony; (penalty scored) Supardi; (penalty scored) Jufriyanto

== Squad ==
As of 7 November 2014

No.	Nat.	Player	Pos.	ISL					Total				
No.	Nat.	Player	Pos.	Apps	Goal	Yellow card	Second yellow card	Red card	Apps	Goal	Yellow card	Second yellow card	Red card
1	(Indonesia)	Muhammad Natshir	GK										
3	(Montenegro)	Vladimir Vujović	DF	27	7	5	1		27	7	5	1	
6	(Indonesia)	Tony Sucipto	DF	25		3			25		3		
7	(Indonesia)	Atep	MF	28	6				28	6			
8	(Indonesia)	Muhammad Taufiq	MF	25		2			25		2		
10	(Mali)	Makan Konaté	MF	28	13	3			28	13	3		
11	(Indonesia)	Rudiyana	FW	3					3				
12	(Indonesia)	Shahar Ginanjar	GK	1		1			1		1		
13	(Indonesia)	Muhammad Agung Pribadi	DF	8					8				
15	(Indonesia)	Firman Utina	MF	27	3	1			27	3	1		
16	(Indonesia)	Achmad Jufriyanto	DF	27	2	4			27	2	4		
17	(Indonesia)	Ferdinand Sinaga	FW	23	11	6		1	23	11	6		1
18	(Indonesia)	Jajang Sukmara	DF	8		1			8		1		
19	(Indonesia)	Sigit Hermawan	FW										
21	(Mali)	Djibril Coulibaly	FW	21	8	2			21	8	2		
22	(Indonesia)	Supardi Nasir	DF	28		2			28		2		
23	(Indonesia)	Muhammad Ridwan	MF	18	2				18	2			
24	(Indonesia)	Hariono	MF	22		5	1		22		5	1	
28	(Indonesia)	Abdul Rahman Sulaiman	DF	12	1				12	1			
78	(Indonesia)	I Made Wirawan	GK	27					27				
82	(Indonesia)	Tantan	FW	26	2	4			26	2	4		
Own goals					3					3			
Totals					56	40	2	1		56	40	2	1

== Transfers ==
=== In ===
No.	Pos.	Name	Moving from	Type	Sources
82	FW	(Indonesia) Tantan	Sriwijaya FC	End of contract	
16	DF	(Indonesia) Achmad Jufriyanto	Sriwijaya FC	End of contract	
17	FW	(Indonesia) Ferdinand Sinaga	Persisam	End of contract	
1	GK	(Indonesia) Muhammad Natshir	Arema Cronous	End of contract	
8	MF	(Indonesia) Muhammad Taufiq	Persebaya 1927	End of contract	
10	MF	(Mali) Makan Konaté	PS Barito Putera	End of contract	
21	FW	(Mali) Djibril Coulibaly	PS Barito Putera	End of contract	
28	DF	(Indonesia) Abdul Rahman Sulaiman	Sriwijaya FC	End of contract	
3	DF	(Montenegro) Vladimir Vujović	(Montenegro) OFK Petrovac	Free transfer	
9	FW	(Nigeria) Udo Fortune	(Israel) Ramat HaSharon	Free transfer	
21	FW	(Mali) Djibril Coulibaly	Free agent	Free transfer	
11	FW	(Indonesia) Rudiyana	Persib Bandung U-21	Promotion to main team	

=== Out ===
No.	Pos.	Name	Moving to	Type	Sources
	GK	(Indonesia) Rizky Bagja		End of contract	
	DF	(Cameroon) Abanda Herman	Barito Putra	End of contract	
	DF	(Indonesia) Aang Suparman	PSS Sleman	End of contract	
	FW	(Indonesia) Airlangga Sutjipto	Semen Padang	End of contract	
	GK	(Indonesia) Cecep Supriatna	PSGC Galuh Ciamis	End of contract	
	MF	(Cameroon) Georges Parfait Mbida Messi	Persiram Raja Ampat	End of contract	
	FW	(Brazil) Hilton Moreira	(Malaysia) Pulau Pinang FA	End of loan	
	MF	(Indonesia) Asri Akbar	Sriwijaya FC	End of contract	
	FW	(Japan) Kenji Adachihara	Persita Tangerang	End of contract	
	DF	(Indonesia) Maman Abdurrahman	Sriwijaya FC	End of contract	
	DF	(Syria) Naser Al Sebai	(India) Churchill Brothers	End of contract	
	FW	(Indonesia) Sergio van Dijk	(Iran) Sepahan F.C.	Contract terminated	
	FW	(Mali) Djibril Coulibaly	Free agent	Released	
	FW	(Nigeria) Udo Fortune	Persik Kediri	Released	

== Statistics ==
=== Clean sheets ===
As of end of season.

Rnk	Pos	No.	Player	Indonesia Super League	Total
1	GK	78	(Indonesia) I Made Wirawan	7	7
2	GK	12	(Indonesia) Shahar Ginanjar	1	1
Total				8	8

=== Overall ===
As of end of season.

Games played	28 (28 Indonesia Super League)
Games won	18 (18 Indonesia Super League)
Games drawn	6 (6 Indonesia Super League)
Games lost	4 (4 Indonesia Super League)
Goals scored	58 (58 Indonesia Super League)
Goals conceded	30 (30 Indonesia Super League)
Goal difference	+28 (+28 Indonesia Super League)
Clean sheets	8 (8 Indonesia Super League)
Yellow cards	39 (39 Indonesia Super League)
Red cards	3 (3 Indonesia Super League)
Worst discipline	(Indonesia) Ferdinand Sinaga (6 (yellow card) , 1 (red card) ) & (Montenegro) Vladimir Vujović (6 (yellow card) , 1 (yellow card) (yellow-red card) )
Best result(s)	W 5 – 0 (H) v Persijap Jepara – Indonesia Super League – 19 August 2014
Worst result(s)	L 1 – 3 (A) v Semen Padang – Indonesia Super League – 15 August 2014
Most Appearances	(Indonesia) Atep, (Mali) Makan Konaté & (Indonesia) Supardi Nasir (28 appearances)
Top scorer(s)	(Mali) Makan Konaté (13 goals)
Top clean sheet(s)	(Indonesia) I Made Wirawan (7 clean sheets)
