= 2013 Persib Bandung season =

Indonesian football club season

Persib Bandung
2013 season
- Owner: PT Persib Bandung Bermartabat
- CEO: Glenn Sugita
- Head coach: Djadjang Nurdjaman
- Stadium: Siliwangi; Si Jalak Harupat
- Indonesia Super League: 4th
- Top goalscorer: League: Sergio van Dijk (21); All: Sergio van Dijk (21)
- Highest home attendance: 26,857 vs. Arema (20 April 2013)
- Lowest home attendance: 10,567 vs. Pelita Bandung Raya (11 June 2013)
- Average home league attendance: 21,405

The 2013 season was the 54th season in the history of Persib Bandung, the club's 18th consecutive season in the top-flight of Indonesian football since it became fully professional, and the fifth season competing in the Indonesia Super League.

They finished the season in fourth place with 63 points and Sergio van Dijk became the team top scorer with 21 goals, with it he equaled the total goals scored by Persib legend Sutiono Lamso in the 1994–95 season.

== Review and events ==
Persib signed naturalized player Sergio van Dijk after the season had started. He made his debut against Persisam Putra Samarinda and scored a goal despite losing the match 2–1. In May 2013, Sriwijaya F.C. and Persib Bandung agreed to exchange players. Dzumafo moved to Sriwijaya and Hilton Moreira moved to Persib.

The match against Persija Jakarta that was due to be played in Gelora Bung Karno on 22 June 2013 was canceled after the bus that was used by the team and officials to reach the stadium was attacked by an unknown group. The rivalry between both clubs is well known; supporters of Persija Jakarta was suspected as the perpetrator of the attack. Police are still doing investigating the incident. PT. Liga Indonesia, which manages the Indonesia Super League, rescheduled the match to be played on 28 August 2013.

The postponed game result was a 1–1 draw. During the match, both sets of supporters clashed inside the stadium in the 16th minute, postponing the match for 20 minutes. Roy Suryo the Minister of Youth and Sports Affairs of Indonesia resigned to calm both parties. As a result of the incident, the disciplinary commission of the Football Association of Indonesia banned the Persib Bandung supporters from attending their next season's away games. The management appealed the verdict.

On 7 September 2013, the management confirmed that Persib Bandung would take part in the post-season friendly tournament Menpora Cup. They were drawn in the same group with Central Coast Mariners FC, Sriwijaya F.C. and Malaysia U-23. From originally five players, only Sergio van Dijk, Tony Sucipto and I Made Wirawan went to play in the 2013 Perang Bintang. The other two players, M. Ridwan and Supardi, were called back to join the team for the 2013 Menpora Cup.

== Matches ==
=== Legend ===
Win Draw Loss Postponed

=== Friendlies ===
5 September 2013	Persib Bandung	5 – 0	Bareti Sariater	Bandung
	M. Ridwan 15', 44', 60' van Dijk 80', 82'	Report		Stadium: Siliwangi

20 September 2013 Menpora Cup	Persib Bandung	2 – 2	Malaysia U-23	Soreang
15:30	Shahrul 27' (o.g.); M. Ridwan 55' (pen.)	Report	Saarvindran 10'; Ridzuwan 61'	Stadium: Si Jalak Harupat

22 September 2013 Menpora Cup	Persib Bandung	2 – 1	Sriwijaya F.C.	Soreang
18:30	M. Ridwan 40'; Airlangga 90'	Report	Dzumafo 90+1'	Stadium: Si Jalak Harupat

24 September 2013 Menpora Cup	Persib Bandung	3 – 3	Central Coast Mariners FC	Soreang
15:30	Adachihara 8'; Messi 15'; Hilton 90+2'	Report	Fitzgerald 3'; Flores 19', 39'	Stadium: Si Jalak Harupat; Referee: M. Adung

=== Indonesia Super League ===
13 January 2013 1	Persib Bandung	1 – 1	Persipura Jayapura	Bandung
19:00	Messi 90'	Report	Bio Paulin 22'	Stadium: Siliwangi; Attendance: 25,200; Referee: Novari Iksan

17 January 2013 2	Persib Bandung	4 – 2	Persiwa Wamena	Bandung
15:30	M. Ridwan 1'; Dzumafo 12'; Adachihara 27', 83'	Report	Camara 52', 60'	Stadium: Siliwangi; Attendance: 20,300; Referee: Iwan Sukoco

31 January 2013 3	Persiram Raja Ampat	2 – 2	Persib Bandung	Sorong
15:15	Quaiyan 68'; Lomell 78'	Report	Adachihara 11'; Dzumafo 61'	Stadium: Stadion Wombik; Attendance: 2,150; Referee: Kusni

4 February 2013 4	Persidafon Dafonsoro	0 – 0	Persib Bandung	Jayapura
15:15		Report		Stadium: Barnabas Youwe; Attendance: 12,259; Referee: Yandri

16 February 2013 5	Persisam Putra Samarinda	2 – 1	Persib Bandung	Samarinda
19:00	Sinaga 26'; Koné 71'	Report	van Dijk 78'	Stadium: Segiri; Attendance: 14,573; Referee: Muslimin

21 February 2013 6	Mitra Kukar F.C.	4 – 2	Persib Bandung	Tenggarong
16:30	M. Ridwan 21' (o.g.); Frangipane 40', 84'; Jajang Mulyana 70'	Report	Abanda 44'; M. Ridwan 73'	Stadium: Aji Imbut; Attendance: 3,596; Referee: Juwari

27 February 2013 7	Persib Bandung	4 – 1	PSPS Pekanbaru	Bandung
15:30	Supardi 25' van Dijk 55'; M. Ridwan 75'; Dzumafo 80'	Report	Makan Konaté 2'	Stadium: Siliwangi; Attendance: 15,530; Referee: Maslah Iksan

3 March 2013 8	Persib Bandung	3 – 1	Persija Jakarta	Soreang
15:30	Adachihara 19' van Dijk 55', 81'	Report	Pedro Velázquez 47'	Stadium: Si Jalak Harupat; Attendance: 26,587; Referee: Prasetyo Hadi

9 March 2013 9	Sriwijaya F.C.	2 – 1	Persib Bandung	Palembang
19:00	Tantan 11'; Boakay Eddie Foday 25'	Report	van Dijk 7'	Stadium: Gelora Sriwijaya Stadium; Attendance: 23,549; Referee: Najamuddin Aspiran

13 March 2013 10	Pelita Bandung Raya	1 – 3	Persib Bandung	Soreang
15:30	Mijo Dadic 61'	Report	Dzumafo 5' van Dijk 26'; Abanda 70'	Stadium: Si Jalak Harupat; Attendance: 15,000; Referee: Maslah Iksan

30 March 2013 11	Persib Bandung	3 – 1	Gresik United	Bandung
15:30	Adachihara 33'; M. Ridwan 75' van Dijk 84'	Report	Usman 53'	Stadium: Siliwangi; Attendance: 22,800; Referee: Suharto

3 April 2013 12	Persib Bandung	3 – 2	PS Barito Putera	Bandung
15:30	Abdurahman 3' van Dijk 55'; Abanda 67'	Report	Hartono 5'; Wayudi 50'	Stadium: Siliwangi; Attendance: 14,575; Referee: Handri Kristanto

7 April 2013 13	Persib Bandung	1 – 0	Persiba Balikpapan	Bandung
15:30	van Dijk 40'	Report		Stadium: Siliwangi; Attendance: 21,500; Referee: Tabrani

15 April 2013 14	Persib Bandung	5 – 1	Persita Tangerang	Bandung
15:30	M. Ridwan 19'; Tony Sucipto 42', 73'; Airlangga 86' van Dijk 89'	Report	Carrasco 84'	Stadium: Siliwangi; Attendance: 15,587; Referee: Yandri

20 April 2013 15	Persib Bandung	1 – 0	Arema	Bandung
16:00	van Dijk 35'	Report		Stadium: Siliwangi; Attendance: 26,857; Referee: Handri Kristanto

28 April 2013 16	Persepam Madura United	1 – 3	Persib Bandung	Bangkalan
19:00	Adelmund 23'	Report	Al Sebai 35'; Dzumafo 38'; Atep 45'	Stadium: Gelora Bangkalan Stadium; Attendance: 16,000; Referee: Handri Kristanto

2 May 2013 17	Persela Lamongan	1 – 1	Persib Bandung	Lamongan
15:30	Arif 75'	Report	M. Ridwan 49'	Stadium: Surajaya Stadium; Attendance: 11,160; Referee: Juwari

12 May 2013 18	Persib Bandung	3 – 1	Persela Lamongan	Bandung
15:30	Utina 4'; M. Ridwan 28'; Adachihara 62'	Report	Arif 21'	Stadium: Siliwangi; Attendance: 22,103; Referee: Maulana Nugraha

19 May 2013 19	Persib Bandung	2 – 1	Persepam Madura United	Soreang
15:30	M. Ridwan 6' van Dijk 19'	Report	Gómez 58'	Stadium: Si Jalak Harupat; Attendance: 24,876; Referee: Kusni

25 May 2013 20	Persita Tangerang	2 – 2	Persib Bandung	Bandung
15:30	Lukmana 71'; Carrasco 81'	Report	van Dijk 80'; Hilton 88'	Stadium: Siliwangi; Attendance: 24,587; Referee: Iwan Sukoco

31 May 2013 21	Arema	1 – 0	Persib Bandung	Malang
15:30	Gonzáles 87'	Report		Stadium: Kanjuruhan Stadium; Attendance: 34,347; Referee: Handri Kristanto

3 June 2013 22	Gresik United	2 – 1	Persib Bandung	Gresik
15:30	Samma 23'; Siswanto 50'	Report	Airlangga 86'	Stadium: Petrokimia Stadium; Attendance: 5,500; Referee: Suprihatin

11 June 2013 23	Persib Bandung	4 – 3	Pelita Bandung Raya	Soreang
15:30	van Dijk 43', 69'; Supardi 45'; Adachihara 61'	Report	Camara 30'; Sayedeh 81', 82'	Stadium: Si Jalak Harupat; Attendance: 10,567; Referee: M. Syarif

15 June 2013 24	Persib Bandung	4 – 0	Sriwijaya FC	Bandung
15:30	van Dijk 58', 89'; Hilton 64'; M. Ridwan 73'	Report		Stadium: Siliwangi; Attendance: 25,000; Referee: Najamuddin Aspiran

25 June 2013 25	PSPS Pekanbaru	0 – 4	Persib Bandung	Bangkinang
10:30		Report	Adachihara 74'; Efendi 82' (o.g.); M. Ridwan 82' van Dijk 90'	Stadium: Tuanku Tambusai Stadium; Attendance: 2,250; Referee: Kusni

30 June 2013 26	Persib Bandung	4 – 1	Persisam Putra	Bandung
15:30	Hilton 2', 71' van Dijk 17'; Adachihara 90'	Report	Osas 59'	Stadium: Si Jalak Harupat; Attendance: 25,133; Referee: Nusur Fadillah

6 July 2013 27	Persib Bandung	0 – 0	Mitra Kukar	Soreang
15:30		Report		Stadium: Si Jalak Harupat; Attendance: 26,660; Referee: Prasetyo Hadi

26 July 2013 28	PS Barito Putera	2 – 2	Persib Bandung	Martapura
21:00	Makan Konaté 17'; Coulibaly 36'	Report	Abanda 26'; Messi 87'	Stadium: Demang Lehman Stadium; Attendance: 7,494; Referee: Solikin

30 July 2013 29	Persiba Balikpapan	1 – 1	Persib Bandung	Balikpapan
21:00	Nguenheu 20'	Report	M. Ridwan 10'	Stadium: Persiba Stadium; Attendance: 5,618; Referee: Yandri

20 August 2013 30	Persib Bandung	2 – 1	Persidafon Dafonsoro	Bandung
15:30	Akbar 60'; Adachihara 90'	Report	Precious 20'	Stadium: Siliwangi; Attendance: 15,068; Referee: Handri Kristanto

24 August 2013 31	Persib Bandung	1 – 2	Persiram	Bandung
15:30	van Dijk 69'	Report	Lee 20'	Stadium: Siliwangi; Attendance: 25,550; Referee: Novari Ikhsan Arilaha

28 August 2013 32	Persija Jakarta	1 – 1	Persib Bandung	Yogyakarta
15:30	Ilham 23'	Report	van Dijk 69'	Stadium: Maguwoharjo Stadium; Attendance: 20,800; Referee: Prasetyo Hadi

11 September 2013 33	Persipura Jayapura	1 – 0	Persib Bandung	Jayapura
17:00	Pae 53'	Report		Stadium: Mandala Stadium; Attendance: 20,536; Referee: Iwan Sukoco

15 September 2013 34	Persiwa Wamena	2 – 3	Persib Bandung	Wamena
16:00	Arey 18'; Mote 29'	Report	M. Ridwan 50'; Airlangga 83'; Messi 83'	Stadium: Pendidikan Stadium; Attendance: 923

== Squad ==
=== Squad, appearances and goals scored ===
As of 20 September 2013

No.	Pos	Nat	Player	Total		Indonesia Super League	
No.	Pos	Nat	Player	Apps	Goals	Apps	Goals
3	DF	(Indonesia) IDN	Aang Suparman	5	0	5	0
4	DF	(Syria) SYR	Naser Al Sebai	21	1	21	1
5	DF	(Indonesia) IDN	Maman Abdurahman	15	1	15	1
6	DF	(Cameroon) CMR	Abanda Herman	29	4	29	4
7	MF	(Indonesia) IDN	Atep	33	1	33	1
8	FW	(Brazil) BRA	Hilton Moreira (on loan from Sriwijaya FC)	14	4	14	4
9	FW	(Indonesia) IDN	Airlangga Sucipto	22	3	22	3
10	FW	(Indonesia) IDN	Sergio van Dijk	29	21	29	21
11	FW	(Japan) JPN	Kenji Adachihara	32	10	32	10
12	GK	(Indonesia) IDN	Shahar Ginanjar	11	0	11	0
13	DF	(Indonesia) IDN	Muhammad Agung Pribadi	3	0	3	0
15	MF	(Indonesia) IDN	Firman Utina	26	1	26	1
16	MF	(Indonesia) IDN	Tony Sucipto	34	2	34	2
18	DF	(Indonesia) IDN	Jajang Sukmara	8	0	8	0
22	DF	(Indonesia) IDN	Supardi Nasir	33	2	33	2
23	MF	(Indonesia) IDN	Muhammad Ridwan	34	12	34	12
24	MF	(Indonesia) IDN	Hariono	31	0	31	0
30	GK	(Indonesia) IDN	Rizky Subagja	0	0	0	0
55	GK	(Indonesia) IDN	Cecep Supriatna	0	0	0	0
66	MF	(Indonesia) IDN	Asri Akbar	28	1	28	1
69	FW	(Indonesia) IDN	Sigit Hermawan	1	0	1	0
78	GK	(Indonesia) IDN	I Made Wirawan	25	0	25	0
80	MF	(Cameroon) CMR	Georges Parfait Mbida Messi	21	3	21	3
99	FW	(Cameroon) CMR	Herman Dzumafo Epandi (on loan to Sriwijaya FC)	16	5	16	5
