= 2016 Persib Bandung season =

Indonesian football club season

Persib Bandung
2016 season
- Owner: PT Persib Bandung Bermartabat
- CEO: Glenn Sugita
- Head coach: Dejan Antonic (until 11 June 2016); Herrie Setyawan (caretaker, until 28 June 2016); Djadjang Nurdjaman (from 29 June 2016)
- Stadium: Si Jalak Harupat; Gelora Bandung Lautan Api; Pakansari; Wibawa Mukti
- Indonesia Soccer Championship: 5th
- Bali Island Cup: Runner-up
- Bhayangkara Cup: Runner-up
- Top goalscorer: League: Sergio van Dijk (10); All: Sergio van Dijk (10)
- Highest home attendance: 35,125 vs Persija Jakarta (16 July 2016)
- Lowest home attendance: 9,789 vs Persela Lamongan (2 July 2016)
| Home colours | Away colours | Third colours |

The 2016 season was the 57th season in the history of Persib Bandung. With the domestic league still suspended due to PSSI's ban by the government of running any competitions, Persib participated in the Indonesia Soccer Championship A. With Si Jalak Harupat Stadium being used for the upcoming Pekan Olahraga Nasional, Persib used Gelora Bandung Lautan Api Stadium from week 7 to 27 as their regular ground for the duration of the event.

== Players ==
=== Squad information ===
| No. | Name | Nat. | Date of birth (age) | Signed in | Contract until | Signed from | Transfer Fee | Notes |
Goalkeepers
| 1 | M. Natshir Fadhil Mahbuby | (Indonesia) | 13 February 1993 (age 33) | 2014 | 2018 | (Indonesia) Arema Cronus | ? | |
| 21 | M. Ridwan | (Indonesia) | 26 March 1991 (age 35) | 2016 | 2018 | (Indonesia) Gresik United | ? | |
| 78 | I Made Wirawan | (Indonesia) | 12 January 1981 (age 45) | 2013 | 2018 | (Indonesia) Persiba Balikpapan | ? | |
Defenders
| 2 | Purwaka Yudhi | (Indonesia) | 11 April 1984 (age 42) | 2016 | 2018 | (Indonesia) Arema Cronus | ? | |
| 3 | Vladimir Vujovic | (Montenegro) | 23 July 1982 (age 44) | 2014 | 2018 | (Montenegro) OFK Petrovac | ? | |
| 4 | Dias Angga Putra | (Indonesia) | 6 May 1989 (age 37) | 2015 | 2018 | (Indonesia) Pelita Bandung Raya | ? | |
| 5 | Diogo Ferreira | (Australia) | 5 October 1989 (age 37) | 2016 | 2016 | (Australia) Perth Glory | ? | |
| 6 | Tony Sucipto | (Indonesia) | 12 February 1986 (age 40) | 2012 | 2018 | (Indonesia) Persija Jakarta | ? | 2nd Vice Captain |
| 18 | Jajang Sukmara | (Indonesia) | 18 November 1988 (age 37) | 2011 | 2018 | (Indonesia) Persib Bandung U-21 | ? | |
| 31 | Rudolof Basna | (Indonesia) | 12 June 1995 (age 31) | 2016 | 2018 | (Indonesia) Mitra Kukar | ? | |
| 55 | Jujun Saepuloh | (Indonesia) | 1 April 1998 (age 28) | 2016 | 2020 | (Indonesia) Persib Bandung U-21 | ? | |
Midfielders
| 7 | Atep | (Indonesia) | 5 June 1985 (age 41) | 2008 | 2018 | (Indonesia) Persija Jakarta | ? | Captain |
| 8 | Taufiq | (Indonesia) | 29 November 1986 (age 39) | 2014 | 2018 | (Indonesia) Persebaya 1927 | ? | |
| 10 | Robertino Pugliara | (Argentina) | 21 February 1984 (age 42) | 2016 | 2018 | (Indonesia) Persipura Jayapura | ? | |
| 13 | M. Agung Pribadi | (Indonesia) | 23 July 1989 (age 37) | 2011 | 2018 | (Indonesia) Persib Bandung U`1 | ? | |
| 17 | Rachmad Hidayat | (Indonesia) | 10 March 1991 (age 35) | 2016 | 2018 | (Indonesia) Pelita Bandung Raya | ? | |
| 19 | Febri Haryadi | (Indonesia) | 19 February 1996 (age 30) | 2015 | 2020 | (Indonesia) Persib Bandung U-21 | ? | |
| 23 | Kim Jeffrey Kurniawan | (Indonesia) | 23 March 1990 (age 36) | 2016 | 2018 | (Indonesia) Pelita Bandung Raya | ? | |
| 24 | Hariono | (Indonesia) | 2 October 1985 (age 41) | 2008 | 2018 | (Indonesia) Deltras Sidoarjo | ? | Vice Captain |
| 48 | Marcos Flores | (Argentina) | 23 October 1985 (age 40) | 2016 | 2016 | (Chile) Curicó Unido | ? | |
| 91 | David Laly | (Indonesia) | 7 November 1991 (age 34) | 2016 | 2018 | (Indonesia) Pelita Bandung Raya | ? | |
| 93 | Gian Zola Nasrulloh Nugraha | (Indonesia) | 5 August 1998 (age 28) | 2015 | 2020 | (Indonesia) Persib Bandung U-21 | ? | |
Forwards
| 9 | Samsul Arif Munip | (Indonesia) | 14 January 1985 (age 41) | 2016 | 2018 | (Indonesia) Arema Cronus | ? | |
| 11 | Rudiyana | (Indonesia) | 4 May 1992 (age 34) | 2014 | 2018 | (Indonesia) Persib Bandung U-21 | ? | |
| 15 | Yandi Sofyan Munawar | (Indonesia) | 25 May 1992 (age 34) | 2015 | 2018 | (Indonesia) Arema Cronus | ? | |
| 33 | Sergio van Dijk | (Indonesia) | 6 August 1982 (age 44) | 2016 | 2018 | (Australia) Adelaide United | ? | |
| 54 | Zulham Zamrun | (Indonesia) | 12 February 1988 (age 38) | 2015 | 2018 | (Indonesia) Persipura Jayapura | ? | |
| 82 | Tantan | (Indonesia) | 6 August 1982 (age 44) | 2014 | 2018 | (Indonesia) Sriwijaya FC | ? | |

Player Loaned
^5^6Febri Hariyadi and Gian Zola loaned to West Java PON for Indonesia National Sport Weeks until the end of the event.

== Pre-season and friendlies ==
| 8 January 2016 Friendly | Persib Bandung | 6–1 | PS Setia | Bandung, Indonesia |
| 15:30 WIT (UTC+07:00) | Zola 7'; Atep 36'; Tantan 37'; Sugianto 55'; Febri 65'; Agung Pribadi 74' (pen.); Rudiyana 85' | | ??? 66' | Stadium: Sesko AD; Attendance: ??? Referee: ??? |

| 3 February 2016 Friendly | Football Plus | 0–9 | Persib Bandung | West Bandung Regency, Indonesia |
| 15:30 WIT (UTC+07:00) | | | Zola 30'; Atep 36'; Laly 48' ??? 55' (o.g.); Rudiyana 63' 64' 90'; Rachmad 83' ??? 87' (o.g.) | Stadium: Football Plus; Attendance: ??? |

| 13 February 2016 Friendly | Persib Bandung | 3–0 | Bali United | Bandung, Indonesia |
| 19:00 WIT (UTC+07:00) | Vujovic 18' (pen.); Rachmad 47'; Aron 48' | | | Stadium: Siliwangi; Attendance: ??? |

| 2 March 2016 Friendly | Persib Bandung | 6–0 | Sari Ater FC | Bandung, Indonesia |
| 15:30 WIT (UTC+07:00) | Zola 19'; Febri 27'; Samsul 29'; Krasic 41'; Yandi Sofyan 65'; Laly 69' | | | Stadium: Progresif; Attendance: ??? |

| 3 March 2016 Friendly | Persib Bandung | 4-1 | Song FC | Bandung, Indonesia |
| 15:30 WIT (UTC+07:00) | Rachmad 27'; Vujovic 34'; Kim 36'; Samsul 52' | | Cahya 79' (pen.) | Stadium: Siliwangi; Attendance: ??? |

| 9 March 2016 Friendly | Persib Bandung | 3–0 | RSUD Cibabat | Cimahi, Indonesia |
| 15:30 WIT (UTC+07:00) | Tantan 15'; Atep 30'; Vujovic 45' (pen.) | | | Stadium: Pusdkipom; Attendance: ??? |

| 12 March 2016 Friendly | Persib Bandung | 3-1 | PS Polri | Bekasi Regency, Indonesia |
| 19:00 WIT (UTC+07:00) | Tantan 31'; Vujovic 62' (pen.); Yandi Sofyan 84' | | James Koko 18' (pen.) | Stadium: Wibawa Mukti; Attendance: ??? |

| 8 April 2016 Friendly | Surabaya United | 1–3 | Persib Bandung | Ciamis, Indonesia |
| 15:30 WIT (UTC+07:00) | Rudi 42' | | Vujovic 57'; Belencoso 71'; Febri 78' | Stadium: Galuh; Attendance: ??? |

| 10 April 2016 Friendly | PSGC Ciamis | 1–5 | Persib Bandung | Ciamis, Indonesia |
| 15:30 WIT (UTC+07:00) | Joko 40' | | Vinsens 6' (o.g.); A.Taufiq 15' (o.g.); Belencoso 20'; Yandi Sofyan 85'; Tantan 90+2' | Stadium: Galuh; Attendance: ??? |

| 20 April 2016 Friendly | Persib Bandung | 3–0 | Cilegon United | West Bandung Regency, Indonesia |
| 15:30 WIT (UTC+07:00) | Vujovic 40' (pen.); Belencoso 62'; Samsul 68' | | | Stadium: Football Plus; Attendance: ??? |

| 25 May 2016 Friendly | Football Plus | 2–4 | Persib Bandung | West Bandung Regency, Indonesia |
| 16:00 WIT (UTC+07:00) | Rizki Alam 6'; Basna 70' (o.g.) | | van Dijk 15'; Rudiyana 26'; Rachmad 58'; Basna 68' | Stadium: Football Plus; Attendance: ??? |

| 1 June 2016 Friendly | Persib Bandung | 12–0 | Alexis FC | West Bandung Regency, Indonesia |
| 16:00 WIT (UTC+07:00) | Rachmad 6' 43'; Tantan 17' van Dijk 37' 45'; Belencoso 52' 56' 71' 74' 76'; Kim 67'; Laly 88' | Report | | Stadium: Football Plus; Attendance: ??? |

| 4 June 2016 Friendly | Persikotas Tasikmalaya | 0–5 | Persib Bandung | Tasikmalaya, Indonesia |
| 16:00 WIT (UTC+07:00) | | Report | Tantan 14' 22' van Dijk 30'; Purwaka 41'; Taufiq 54'; Zulham 74' | Stadium: Wiradadaha; Attendance: ??? |

== Competitions ==
=== Overall ===
| Competition | Started round | Current position | Final position | First match | Last match |
|---|---|---|---|---|---|
| Bali Island Cup | First Match | — | runner-up | 18 February 2016 | 23 February 2016 |
| Bhayangkara Cup | Group stage | — | runner-up | 17 March 2016 | 3 April 2016 |
| Indonesia Soccer Championship | Matchday 1 | 9th | — | 30 April 2016 | 17 December 2016 |

Last updated: 5 August 2016

=== League table ===
| Pos | Team | Pld | W | D | L | GF | GA | GD | Pts |
|---|---|---|---|---|---|---|---|---|---|
| 3 | Madura United | 34 | 18 | 7 | 9 | 56 | 40 | +16 | 61 |
| 4 | Sriwijaya | 34 | 15 | 11 | 8 | 62 | 39 | +23 | 56 |
| 5 | Persib | 34 | 15 | 10 | 9 | 45 | 33 | +12 | 55 |
| 6 | PSM | 34 | 16 | 6 | 12 | 52 | 46 | +6 | 54 |
| 7 | Bhayangkara | 34 | 15 | 9 | 10 | 50 | 34 | +16 | 54 |

Source: Liga Indonesia, Indonesia Soccer Championship
Rules for classification: 1) Points; 2) Head-to-head goal difference; 3) Goal difference; 4) Goals scored; 5) Draw.

==== Results summary ====
| Overall | | | | | | | | Home | | | | | | Away | | | | | |
| Pld | W | D | L | GF | GA | GD | Pts | W | D | L | GF | GA | GD | W | D | L | GF | GA | GD |
|---|---|---|---|---|---|---|---|---|---|---|---|---|---|---|---|---|---|---|---|
| 34 | 15 | 10 | 9 | 43 | 33 | +10 | 55 | 13 | 4 | 0 | 29 | 8 | +21 | 2 | 6 | 9 | 14 | 25 | −11 |

Last updated: 23 December 2016.
Source: Competitive matches

==== Results by round ====
| Round | 1 | 2 | 3 | 4 | 5 | 6 | 7 | 8 | 9 | 10 | 11 | 12 | 13 | 14 | 15 | 16 | 17 | 18 | 19 |
|---|---|---|---|---|---|---|---|---|---|---|---|---|---|---|---|---|---|---|---|
| Ground | H | A | H | A | H | A | H | A | H | H | A | A | H | A | H | A | H | A | A |
| Result | D | D | W | D | D | L | W | L | W | D | W | L | W | L | W | W | D | L | L |
| Position | 8 | 11 | 6 | 6 | 8 | 13 | 9 | 12 | 9 | 9 | 7 | 8 | | | | | | | |

Updated to match(es) played on 23 December 2016. Source: Competitive matches
A = Away; H = Home; W = Win; D = Draw; L = Loss

==== Matches ====
| 30 April 2016 1 | Persib Bandung | 1–1 | Sriwijaya FC | Soreang |
| 18:30 WIT (UTC+07:00) | Vujovic (yellow card) 41'; Basna (yellow card) 66'; Hariono (yellow card) 71'; Tantan 90+2' | | Jufriyanto (yellow card) 17'; Beto (yellow card) 23' (goal) 45+1'; Supardi (yellow card) 74'; Teja (yellow card) 77' | Stadium: Si Jalak Harupat; Attendance: 25,125; Referee: Muslimin |

| 7 May 2016 2 | PBFC | 0–0 | Persib Bandung | Samarinda |
| 19:30 CIT (UTC+08:00) | Diego (yellow card) 49'; Aang (yellow card) 63' | | | Stadium: Segiri; Attendance: 2,760; Referee: Djumadi Effendi |

| 14 May 2016 3 | Persib Bandung | 2–0 | Bali United | Soreang |
| 18:30 WIT (UTC+07:00) | Vujovic 30' (pen.); Laly 40'; Kim (yellow card) 58' | | Syakir (yellow card) 58'; Fadhil (yellow card) 80' | Stadium: Si Jalak Harupat; Attendance: 18,572; Referee: Iwan Sukoco |

| 21 May 2016 4 | Persiba Balikpapan | 1–1 | Persib Bandung | Balikpapan |
| 20:00 CIT (UTC+08:00) | Matsunaga 57' (pen.); Absor (yellow card) 87' | | Hariono (yellow card) 70'; Vujovic 76' (yellow card) 87'; Belencoso (yellow card) 90' | Stadium: Persiba; Attendance: 4,000; Referee: Maulana Nugraha |

| 28 May 2016 5 | Persib Bandung | 0–0 | Madura United | Soreang |
| 18:30 WIT (UTC+07:00) | Dias (yellow card) 24'; Vujovic (yellow card) 83' | | Pablo (yellow card) 31' | Stadium: Si Jalak Harupat; Attendance: 20,092; Referee: Kusni |

| 11 June 2016 6 | Bhayangkara Surabaya United | 4–1 | Persib Bandung | Sidoarjo |
| 19:30 WIT (UTC+07:00) | Thiago 41' 52' (yellow card) 90'; Rudi 44'; Fatchu (yellow card) 61'; Dutra 64'; Helber (yellow card) 84'; Putu Gede (yellow card) 88' | Report | Tantan (yellow card) 33'; Samsul (yellow card) 76' (goal) 86' | Stadium: Gelora Delta; Attendance: 6,100; Referee: Abdul Rahman Salasa |

| 18 June 2016 7 | Persib Bandung | 2–1 | Mitra Kukar | Bandung |
| 19:30 WIT (UTC+07:00) | Atep 6' (yellow card) 14'; Samsul (yellow card) 32'; Robertino 40' (yellow card) 45'; Hariono (yellow card) 55'; Basna (yellow card) 75' | Report | Orah (yellow card) 8'; Saepuloh (yellow card) 26'; Marlon 56' (yellow card) 87' | Stadium: Gelora Bandung Lautan Api; Attendance: 19,975; Referee: Prasetyo Hadi |

| 27 June 2016 8 | Gresik United | 2–1 | Persib Bandung | Gresik Regency |
| 19:30 WIT (UTC+07:00) | Patrick 29'; In-Kyun (yellow card) 69'; Yusuf 90' | Report | Basna (yellow card) 11'; Tony (yellow card) 52'; Vujovic (yellow card) 76'; Tantan 82' | Stadium: Petrokimia; Attendance: 9,375; Referee: Wendy Umar Senoaji |

| 2 July 2016 9 | Persib Bandung | 3–2 | PSM Makassar | Bandung |
| 19:30 WIT (UTC+07:00) | van Dijk 33' (pen.); Robertino 45'; Purwaka 87' | Report | Ardan 43'; Muchlis (yellow card) 68' (goal) 81'; Ferdinand (yellow card) 89' | Stadium: Gelora Bandung Lautan Api; Attendance: 14,920; Referee: Dwi Purba Adi Wicaksana |

| 16 July 2016 10 | Persib Bandung | 0–0 | Persija Jakarta | Bandung |
| 19:00 WIT (UTC+07:00) | | | Soon Hak (yellow card) 12'; Andik (yellow card) 71'; Andritany (yellow card) 80'; Sutanto (yellow card) 89' | Stadium: Gelora Bandung Lautan Api; Attendance: 35,125; Referee: Bahrul Ulum |

| 21 July 2016 11 | Persipura Jayapura | 0–2 | Persib Bandung | Jayapura |
| 15:30 EIT (UTC+09:00) | Salampessy (red card) | | Vujovic 45+2' (pen.); Basna (yellow card) 65'; Tony (yellow card) 80'; Samsul 90+2' | Stadium: Mandala; Attendance: 13,324; Referee: Muslimin |

| 25 July 2016 12 | Semen Padang | 4–0 | Persib Bandung | Padang |
| 19:00 WIT (UTC+07:00) | Marcel 4' 50'; Vendry Mofu 29'; Riko 64' | | Jajang (yellow card) 34' | Stadium: H. Agus Salim; Attendance: 9,867; Referee: Iwan Sukoco |

| 29 July 2016 13 | Persib Bandung | 1–0 | Persela Lamongan | Bandung |
| 21:00 WIT (UTC+07:00) | Robertino 48'; Samsul (yellow card) 71' | | Radikal Idealis (yellow card) 87' | Stadium: Gelora Bandung Lautan Api; Attendance: 9,789; Referee: Nusur Fadillah |

| 6 August 2016 14 | Perseru Serui | 1–0 | Persib Bandung | Serui |
| 14:00 EIT (UTC+09:00) | Alex Wayoi (yellow card) 13'; Gakou 40'; Yesaya (yellow card) 87' | | van Dijk (yellow card) 35' | Stadium: Marora; Attendance: 2,891; Referee: Abdul Rahman Salasa |

| 13 August 2016 15 | Persib Bandung | 2–0 | Barito Putera | Cibinong |
| 19:00 WIT (UTC+07:00) | Zulham 22'; Atep 57' | | Mohammadou (yellow card) 9'; Hansamu (yellow card) 80' | Stadium: Pakansari; Attendance: 22,783; Referee: Djumadi Effendi |

| 21 August 2016 16 | PS TNI | 0–3 | Persib Bandung | Cibinong |
| 19:00 WIT (UTC+07:00) | Suhandi (yellow card) 34'; Hendri Aprilianto (yellow card) 64' | | Kim Kurniawan 19' van Dijk 23' 34' (yellow card) 53' | Stadium: Pakansari; Attendance: 17,656; Referee: Fariq Hitaba |

| 27 August 2016 17 | Persib Bandung | 0–0 | Arema Cronus | Soreang |
| 15:30 WIT (UTC+07:00) | Hariono (yellow card) 68' | | Alfarizi (yellow card) 64' | Stadium: Si Jalak Harupat; Attendance: 20,581; Referee: Adi Riyanto |

| 10 September 2016 18 | Sriwijaya F.C. | 3–0 | Persib Bandung | Palembang |
| 19:00 WIT (UTC+07:00) | T.A. Musafri 4' 77'; Firman Utina (yellow card) 31'; Rizky Dwi Ramadhana (yellow card) 34'; Bento Gonçalves 58'; Zalnando (yellow card) 79' | | Jajang Sukmara (yellow card) 36'; Sergio van Dijk (yellow card) 37'; Atep (yellow card) 65' | Stadium: Jakabaring; Attendance: - Referee: Fariq Hitaba |

| 18 September 2016 19 | Bali United F.C. | 1–0 | Persib Bandung | Gianyar Regency |
| 19:00 WIT (UTC+07:00) | I Made Wirahadi (yellow card) 29'; I Gede Sukadana (yellow card) 35'; Miftahul Hamdi 55'; Yabes Roni (yellow card) 60' | | Jajang Sukmara (yellow card) 36'; Sergio van Dijk (yellow card) 37'; Atep (yellow card) 65' | Stadium: I Wayan Dipta; Attendance: - Referee: - |

==== Score overview ====
Win Draw Loss

| Opponents | Home score | Away score | Double? |
|---|---|---|---|
| Arema Cronus | 0–0 | 17 Dec 2016 | |
| Bali United | 2–0 | 0-1 | |
| Bhayangkara Surabaya United | 12 Oct 2016 | 1–4 | |
| Barito Putera | 2–0 | 4 Dec 2016 | |
| Gresik United | 22 Oct 2016 | 1–2 | |
| Madura United | 0–0 | 8 Oct 2016 | |
| Mitra Kukar | 2–1 | 16 Oct 2016 | |
| Persela Lamongan | 1–0 | | |
| Perseru Serui | | 1–0 | |
| Persiba Balikpapan | | 1–1 | |
| Persija Jakarta | 0–0 | | |
| Persipura Jayapura | | 2–0 | |
| PS TNI | | 3–0 | |
| PSM Makassar | 3–2 | | |
| PBFC | | 0–0 | |
| Semen Padang | | 0–4 | |
| Sriwijaya FC | 1–1 | 0–3 | |

Note: Persib Bandung goals are listed first.

=== 2016 Bali Island Cup ===
==== Final standings ====
| Pos | Team | Pld | W | D | L | GF | GA | GD | Pts |
|---|---|---|---|---|---|---|---|---|---|
| 1 | Arema Cronus | 3 | 3 | 0 | 0 | 9 | 3 | +6 | 9 |
| 2 | Persib Bandung | 3 | 1 | 1 | 1 | 5 | 4 | +1 | 4 |
| 3 | Bali United | 3 | 0 | 2 | 1 | 3 | 5 | −2 | 2 |
| 4 | PSS Sleman | 3 | 0 | 1 | 2 | 5 | 10 | −5 | 1 |

| 18 February 2016 1 | Persib Bandung | 4–2 | PSS Sleman | Gianyar, Indonesia |
| 17:30 CIT (UTC+08:00) | Dias (yellow card) 14'; Hermawan (yellow card) 23'; Krasic (yellow card) 39'; Rachmad 42'; Atep 51'; Laly 83'; Samsul 90' (pen.); Vujovic (yellow card) 90+2' | | Wahyu 44' (pen.); Rumba (yellow card) 89'; Mbamba 90+2' (pen.) | Stadium: Kapten I Wayan Dipta; Attendance: 11.000; Referee: M. Syafei - Batam |

| 21 February 2016 2 | Bali United | 1-1 | Persib Bandung | Gianyar, Indonesia |
| 17:30 CIT (UTC+08:00) | Sukadana (yellow card) 13'; Hendra Sandi (yellow card) 24'; Sukarja (yellow card) 27'; Putu Gede 59' (yellow card) 69' | | Rachmad (yellow card) 20'; Atep 41'; Hariono (yellow card) 62' | Stadium: Kapten I Wayan Dipta; Attendance: 15000; Referee: Solikin - Surabaya |

| 23 February 2016 3 | Persib Bandung | 0-1 | Arema Cronus | Gianyar, Indonesia |
| 17:30 CIT (UTC+08:00) | Rachmad (yellow card) 32' | | Lopicic 12'; Kipuw (yellow card) 43'; Hamka (yellow card) 63'; Lopicic (yellow card) 77' | Stadium: Kapten I Wayan Dipta; Attendance: 20000; Referee: Agus Joko - Magelang |

=== 2016 Bhayangkara Cup ===
==== Group stage-Group A ====
| Pos | Team | Pld | W | D | L | GF | GA | GD | Pts |
|---|---|---|---|---|---|---|---|---|---|
| 1 | Persib Bandung | 4 | 3 | 1 | 0 | 6 | 1 | +5 | 10 |
| 2 | Sriwijaya FC | 4 | 2 | 1 | 1 | 7 | 6 | +1 | 7 |
| 3 | PS TNI | 4 | 1 | 1 | 2 | 5 | 6 | −1 | 4 |
| 4 | PBFC | 4 | 1 | 0 | 3 | 4 | 8 | −4 | 3 |
| 5 | Mitra Kukar | 4 | 0 | 3 | 1 | 5 | 6 | −1 | 3 |

| 17 March 2016 1 | Mitra Kukar | 1–1 | Persib Bandung | Bandung Regency, Indonesia |
| 20:45 WIT (UTC+07:00) | Arthur (yellow card) 26'; Marlon 28' (yellow card) 65'; Rodrigo (yellow card) 69'; Septian David (yellow card) 90' | | Tantan (yellow card) 54'; Hariono (yellow card) 58'; Vujovic (yellow card) 69' (goal) 88' (pen.) | Stadium: Si Jalak Harupat; Attendance: ??? Referee: Handri Kristanto |

| 20 March 2016 2 | Persib Bandung | 1–0 | PBFC | Bandung Regency, Indonesia |
| 20:35 WIT (UTC+07:00) | Vujovic (yellow card) 46' (yellow-red card) 50'; Samsul 73' | | Sandi Sute (yellow card) 17'; Boschetti (yellow card) 23'; Leonard (yellow card) 25' (yellow-red card) 50'; Galih (yellow card) 40' | Stadium: Si Jalak Harupat; Attendance: ??? Referee: Muslimin |

| 24 March 2016 3 | PS TNI | 0–2 | Persib Bandung | Bandung Regency, Indonesia |
| 17:40 WIT (UTC+07:00) | | | Basna (yellow card) 40'; Taufiq (yellow card) 44'; Samsul 45+1'; Atep 46'; Yandi Sofyan (yellow card) 82'; Agung Pribadi (yellow card) 84'; Tantan (yellow card) 89' | Stadium: Si Jalak Harupat; Attendance: ??? Referee: Nusur Fadillah |

| 26 March 2016 4 | Persib Bandung | 2–0 | Sriwijaya FC | Bandung Regency, Indonesia |
| 20:30 WIT (UTC+07:00) | Samsul 10'; Basna (yellow card) 15'; Hariono (yellow card) 69'; Belencoso 76'; Tony (yellow card) 79' | | Fachrudin (yellow card) 13'; Jufriyanto (yellow card) 29'; Hyun-Koo (yellow card) 67' | Stadium: Si Jalak Harupat; Attendance: ??? Referee: Muslimin |

===== Semi-final =====
| 30 March 2016 Semi Final | Persib Bandung | 1–0 | Bali United | Bandung Regency, Indonesia |
| 18:30 WIT (UTC+07:00) | Tantan (yellow card) 59' (goal) 78'; Vujovic (yellow card) 68' | | Ganjar (yellow card) 43'; Bobby (yellow card) 45'; Escobar (yellow card) 71'; Loudry (yellow card) 80' | Stadium: Si Jalak Harupat; Attendance: ??? Referee: Nusur Fadillah |

===== Final =====
| 3 April 2016 Final | Arema Cronus | 2–0 | Persib Bandung | Jakarta, Indonesia |
| 20:30 WIT (UTC+07:00) | Vizcarra (yellow card) 14'; Alfarizi (yellow card) 22'; Maitimo 59'; Lopicic (yellow card) 78'; Sunarto 85' | | Tony (yellow card) 37'; Belencoso (yellow card) 41'; Basna (yellow card) 53' (yellow-red card) 71' | Stadium: Gelora Bung Karno; Attendance: ??? Referee: Nusur Fadillah |

== Statistics ==
=== Appearances and goals ===
| No. | Pos | Nat | Player | Total | | ISC | | Bali Island Cup | | Bhayangkara Cup | |
| No. | Pos | Nat | Player | Apps | Goals | Apps | Goals | Apps | Goals | Apps | Goals |
Goalkeepers
| 1 | GK | (Indonesia) IDN | M. Natshir | 2 | 0 | 2 | 0 | 0 | 0 | 0 | 0 |
| 21 | GK | (Indonesia) IDN | M. Ridwan | 0 | 0 | 0 | 0 | 0 | 0 | 0 | 0 |
| 78 | GK | (Indonesia) IDN | I Made Wirawan | 21 | 0 | 12 | 0 | 3 | 0 | 6 | 0 |
Defenders
| 2 | DF | (Indonesia) IDN | Purwaka Yudhi | 16 | 1 | 9 | 1 | 1+1 | 0 | 5 | 0 |
| 3 | DF | (Montenegro) MNE | Vladimir Vujovic | 20 | 5 | 12 | 3 | 3 | 1 | 5 | 1 |
| 4 | DF | (Indonesia) IDN | Dias Angga Putra | 11 | 0 | 6 | 0 | 3 | 0 | 1+1 | 0 |
| 6 | DF | (Indonesia) IDN | Tony Sucipto | 22 | 0 | 13 | 0 | 3 | 0 | 6 | 0 |
| 16 | DF | (Indonesia) IDN | Hermawan | 4 | 0 | 1 | 0 | 2 | 0 | 1 | 0 |
| 18 | DF | (Indonesia) IDN | Jajang Sukmara | 9 | 0 | 9 | 0 | 0 | 0 | 0 | 0 |
| 31 | DF | (Indonesia) IDN | Rudolof Basna | 15 | 0 | 11 | 0 | 0 | 0 | 4 | 0 |
| 55 | DF | (Indonesia) IDN | Jujun Saepulloh | 0 | 0 | 0 | 0 | 0 | 0 | 0 | 0 |
Midfielders
| 7 | MF | (Indonesia) IDN | Atep | 21 | 4 | 6+6 | 1 | 3 | 2 | 6 | 1 |
| 8 | MF | (Indonesia) IDN | Taufiq | 15 | 0 | 2+4 | 0 | 0+3 | 0 | 5+1 | 0 |
| 10 | MF | (Argentina) ARG | Robertino Pugliara | 15 | 3 | 15 | 3 | 0 | 0 | 0 | 0 |
| 13 | MF | (Indonesia) IDN | M. Agung Pribadi | 6 | 0 | 1 | 0 | 0+2 | 0 | 2+1 | 0 |
| 17 | MF | (Indonesia) IDN | Rachmad Hidayat | 4 | 1 | 1 | 0 | 3 | 1 | 0 | 0 |
| 19 | MF | (Indonesia) IDN | Febri Hariyadi | 6 | 0 | 0+1 | 0 | 0 | 0 | 1+4 | 0 |
| 23 | MF | (Indonesia) IDN | Kim Kurniawan | 20 | 0 | 10+1 | 0 | 2+1 | 0 | 6 | 0 |
| 24 | MF | (Indonesia) IDN | Hariono | 19 | 0 | 11 | 0 | 3 | 0 | 5 | 0 |
| 5 | DF | (Australia) AUS | Diogo Ferreira | 1 | 0 | 0+1 | 0 | 0 | 0 | 0 | 0 |
| 48 | MF | (Argentina) ARG | Marcos Flores | 1 | 0 | 1 | 0 | 0 | 0 | 0 | 0 |
| 91 | MF | (Indonesia) IDN | David Laly | 17 | 2 | 5+5 | 1 | 1+2 | 1 | 0+4 | 0 |
| 93 | MF | (Indonesia) IDN | Gian Zola | 2 | 0 | 0 | 0 | 0 | 0 | 1+1 | 0 |
Forwards
| 9 | FW | (Indonesia) IDN | Samsul Arif | 20 | 6 | 7+4 | 2 | 1+2 | 1 | 5+1 | 3 |
| 11 | FW | (Indonesia) IDN | Rudiyana | 3 | 0 | 0 | 0 | 0+3 | 0 | 0 | 0 |
| 15 | FW | (Indonesia) IDN | Yandi Sofyan | 5 | 0 | 0 | 0 | 1+1 | 0 | 0+3 | 0 |
| 33 | FW | (Indonesia) IDN | Sergio van Dijk | 5 | 1 | 3+2 | 1 | 0 | 0 | 0 | 0 |
| 54 | FW | (Indonesia) IDN | Zulham Zamrun | 6 | 0 | 5+1 | 0 | 0 | 0 | 0 | 0 |
| 82 | FW | (Indonesia) IDN | Tantan | 20 | 3 | 3+9 | 2 | 3 | 0 | 1+4 | 1 |
| 99 | FW | (Spain) ESP | Juan Belencoso | 14 | 1 | 7+1 | 0 | 0 | 0 | 6 | 1 |

Last updated: 28 July 2016
Source: Competitions

=== Goalscorers ===
| Rank | No. | Pos | Nat | Player | ISC | Bali Island Cup | Bhayangkara Cup | Total |
|---|---|---|---|---|---|---|---|---|
| 1 | 9 | FW | (Indonesia) | Samsul Arif | 2 | 1 | 3 | 6 |
| 2 | 3 | DF | (Montenegro) | Vladimir Vujovic | 3 | 1 | 1 | 5 |
| 3 | 7 | MF | (Indonesia) | Atep | 1 | 2 | 1 | 4 |
| 4 | 82 | FW | (Indonesia) | Tantan | 2 | 0 | 1 | 3 |
| 5 | 91 | MF | (Indonesia) | David Laly | 1 | 1 | 0 | 2 |
| 5 | 10 | MF | (Argentina) | Robertino Pugliara | 2 | 0 | 0 | 2 |
| 6 | 99 | FW | (Spain) | Juan Belencoso | 0 | 0 | 1 | 1 |
| 6 | 17 | MF | (Indonesia) | Rachmad Hidayat | 0 | 1 | 0 | 1 |
| 6 | 33 | FW | (Indonesia) | Sergio van Dijk | 1 | 0 | 0 | 1 |
| 6 | 2 | DF | (Indonesia) | Purwaka Yudhi | 1 | 0 | 0 | 1 |
| Own goal | | | | | 0 | 0 | 0 | 0 |
| Totals | | | | | 13 | 5 | 7 | 25 |

=== Assists ===
| Rank | No. | Pos | Nat | Player | ISC | Bali Island Cup | Bhayangkara Cup | Total |
|---|---|---|---|---|---|---|---|---|
| 1 | 8 | MF | (Indonesia) | Taufiq | 0 | 0 | 2 | 2 |
| 1 | 99 | FW | (Spain) | Juan Belencoso | 1 | 0 | 1 | 2 |
| 1 | 91 | MF | (Indonesia) | David Laly | 2 | 0 | 0 | 2 |
| 2 | 17 | MF | (Indonesia) | Rachmad Hidayat | 0 | 1 | 0 | 1 |
| 2 | 24 | MF | (Indonesia) | Hariono | 0 | 1 | 0 | 1 |
| 2 | 23 | MF | (Indonesia) | Kim Kurniawan | 0 | 1 | 0 | 1 |
| 2 | 2 | DF | (Indonesia) | Purwaka Yudhi | 0 | 0 | 1 | 1 |
| 2 | 54 | FW | (Indonesia) | Zulham Zamrun | 1 | 0 | 0 | 1 |
| 2 | 7 | MF | (Indonesia) | Atep | 1 | 0 | 0 | 1 |
| Totals | | | | | 4 | 3 | 4 | 11 |

=== Clean sheets ===
| Rank | No. | Pos | Nat | Player | ISC | Bali Island Cup | Bhayangkara Cup | Total |
|---|---|---|---|---|---|---|---|---|
| 1 | 78 | GK | (Indonesia) | I Made Wirawan | 5 | 0 | 4 | 9 |
| Totals | | | | | 5 | 0 | 4 | 9 |

=== Disciplinary record ===
| No. | Pos | Nat | Player | ISC | | | Bali Island Cup | | | Bhayangkara Cup | | | Total | | |
| No. | Pos | Nat | Player | Yellow card | (yellow card) (yellow-red card) | Red card | Yellow card | (yellow card) (yellow-red card) | Red card | Yellow card | (yellow card) (yellow-red card) | Red card | Yellow card | (yellow card) (yellow-red card) | Red card |
| 1 | GK | (Indonesia) | M. Natshir | | | | | | | | | | 0 | 0 | 0 |
| 21 | GK | (Indonesia) | M. Ridwan | | | | | | | | | | 0 | 0 | 0 |
| 78 | GK | (Indonesia) | I Made Wirawan | | | | | | | | | | 0 | 0 | 0 |
| 2 | DF | (Indonesia) | Purwaka Yudhi | | | | | | | | | | 0 | 0 | 0 |
| 3 | DF | (Montenegro) | Vladimir Vujovic | 4 | | | | | | 2 | 1 | | 6 | 1 | 0 |
| 4 | DF | (Indonesia) | Dias Angga Putra | 1 | | | 1 | | | | | | 2 | 0 | 0 |
| 6 | DF | (Indonesia) | Tony Sucipto | 2 | | | | | | 2 | | | 3 | 0 | 0 |
| 16 | DF | (Indonesia) | Hermawan | | | | 1 | | | | | | 1 | 0 | 0 |
| 18 | DF | (Indonesia) | Jajang Sukmara | 1 | | | | | | | | | 1 | 0 | 0 |
| 31 | DF | (Indonesia) | Rudolof Basna | 4 | | | | | | 2 | 1 | | 5 | 1 | 0 |
| 55 | DF | (Indonesia) | Jujun Saepuloh | | | | | | | | | | 0 | 0 | 0 |
| 7 | MF | (Indonesia) | Atep | 1 | | | | | | | | | 1 | 0 | 0 |
| 8 | MF | (Indonesia) | Taufiq | | | | | | | 1 | | | 1 | 0 | 0 |
| 10 | MF | (Argentina) | Robertino Pugliara | 1 | | | | | | | | | 1 | 0 | 0 |
| 13 | MF | (Indonesia) | M. Agung Pribadi | | | | | | | 1 | | 1 | 1 | 0 | 1 |
| 17 | MF | (Indonesia) | Rachmad Hidayat | | | | 1 | | | | | | 1 | 0 | 0 |
| 19 | MF | (Indonesia) | Febri Hariyadi | | | | | | | 1 | | | 1 | 0 | 0 |
| 23 | MF | (Indonesia) | Kim Kurniawan | 1 | | | | | | | | | 1 | 0 | 0 |
| 24 | MF | (Indonesia) | Hariono | 3 | | | 1 | | | 2 | | | 6 | 0 | 0 |
| 91 | MF | (Indonesia) | David Laly | | | | | | | | | | 0 | 0 | 0 |
| 93 | MF | (Indonesia) | Gian Zola | | | | | | | | | | 0 | 0 | 0 |
| 9 | FW | (Indonesia) | Samsul Arif | 2 | | | | | | | | | 2 | 0 | 0 |
| 11 | FW | (Indonesia) | Rudiyana | | | | | | | | | | 0 | 0 | 0 |
| 15 | FW | (Indonesia) | Yandi Sofyan | | | | | | | 1 | | | 1 | 0 | 0 |
| 33 | FW | (Indonesia) | Sergio van Dijk | | | | | | | | | | 0 | 0 | 0 |
| 54 | FW | (Indonesia) | Zulham Zamrun | | | | | | | | | | 0 | 0 | 0 |
| 82 | FW | (Indonesia) | Tantan | 1 | | | | | | 3 | | | 4 | 0 | 0 |
| 99 | FW | (Spain) | Juan Belencoso | 1 | | | | | | 1 | | | 2 | 0 | 0 |

=== Suspensions ===
| No. | Pos | Nat | Player | Opponents | Date | Competitions | Reason |
| 3 | DF | (Montenegro) | Vladimir Vujovic | PS TNI | 24 March 2016 | Bhayangkara Cup | (yellow card) (yellow-red card) (vs. PBFC) |
| 3 | DF | (Montenegro) | Vladimir Vujovic | Bhayangkara Surabaya United | 11 June 2016 | Indonesia Soccer Championship | Yellow card |
| 13 | MF | (Indonesia) | M. Agung Pribadi | Pusamania Borneo | 20 March 2016 | Bhayangkara Cup | (red card) (vs. Mitra Kukar) |
| 24 | MF | (Indonesia) | Hariono | Gresik United | 27 June 2016 | Indonesia Soccer Championship | Yellow card |
| 31 | DF | (Indonesia) | Rudolof Basna | PSM Makassar | 2 July 2016 | Indonesia Soccer Championship | Yellow card |
