= Supriatna (surname) =

Supriatna is a surname found in Indonesia. Notable people with this surname include:

- Cecep Supriatna (born 1975), Indonesian former football player
- Dadang Supriatna (born 1971), Indonesian politician
