= Sigit =

Sigit can refer to:

- Sygyt, a style of Tuvan throat singing
- The S.I.G.I.T., Indonesian rock band
- Sigit Budiarto (born 1975), Indonesian badminton player
- Sigit Hermawan (born 1990), Indonesian footballer
- Sigit Purnomo Said (born 1979), Indonesian singer and politician
