= Purwaka Yudhi =

Indonesian footballer

Personal information
- Full name: Purwaka Yudhi Pratomo
- Date of birth: 11 April 1984 (age 42)
- Place of birth: Bandar Lampung, Indonesia
- Height: 1.69 m (5 ft 7 in)
- Positions: Centre-back; defensive midfielder

Senior career*
Years	Team	Apps	(Gls)
2004–2006	Petrokimia Putra	14	(0)
2006–2008	Deltras Sidoarjo	26	(0)
2008	Persekabpas	11	(0)
2009	Deltras Sidoarjo	16	(0)
2009–2011	Arema Indonesia	37	(0)
2011–2012	Deltras Sidoarjo	20	(0)
2012–2016	Arema Cronus	40	(0)
2016	Persib Bandung	11	(1)
2018–2019	Arema	15	(0)
2019–2020	PSS Sleman	16	(0)
2020–2021	PSIM Yogyakarta	9	(0)
2022–2023	PSS Sleman	5	(0)
2023–2024	PSIM Yogyakarta	6	(0)

International career
2006−2007	Indonesia U23		
2007−2011	Indonesia	4	(0)
- * Club domestic league appearances and goals as of 6 February 2024

Purwaka Yudhi Pratomo (born 11 April 1984) is an Indonesian professional footballer. He plays mainly at centre-back but can also operate as a defensive midfielder.

== International career ==
In 2007, he played to represent the Indonesia U-23, in 2007 SEA Games.

== Honours ==
Persib Bandung

- Bhayangkara Cup runner-up: 2016

Arema

- Indonesia Super League: 2009–10
- Indonesia Super League runner-up: 2010–11
- Piala Indonesia runner-up: 2010
- East Java Governor Cup: 2013
- Menpora Cup: 2013
- Indonesian Inter Island Cup: 2014/15
