= DJ Marfox =

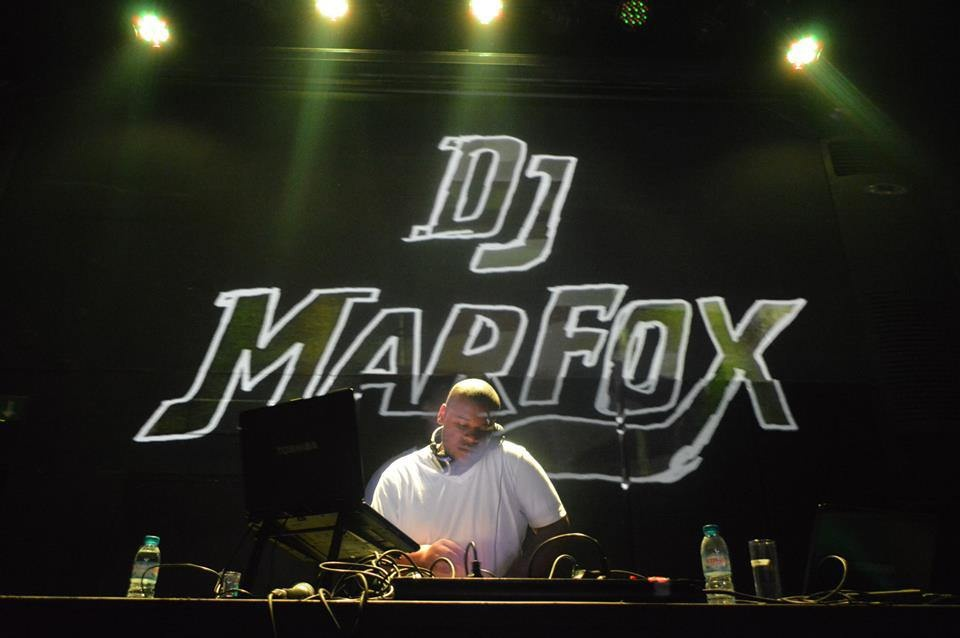
- 2013 performance in Lisbon's MusicBox

Background information
- Born: Marlon Silva; June 1988 (age 38); Lisbon, Portugal
- Genres: Afro-Portuguese; batida/batucada; instrumental; kuduro
- Occupation: DJ
- Years active: 2002–present
- Labels: Príncipe Discos (Portugal); Pollinate (UK); Enchufada (Portugal); Lit City Trax (USA); WARP (UK)
- Website: www.djmarfox.pt.vu

DJ Marfox (born Marlon Silva in June 1988) is a Portuguese DJ best known for pioneering batida or batucada, a music genre that emerged from Lisbon's housing estates. Batida and Batucada are referred to as the "ghetto sound of Lisbon", and they incorporate African-influenced dance music such as kuduro, kizomba, funaná and tarraxinha with house and techno.

Taking inspiration from a Nintendo character, 'Marfox' merged part of his first name "Marl" from "Marlon" with Star Fox, a character he played as a teenager.

== Career ==
Silva was born in Lisbon, Portugal to parents from São Tomé e Príncipe. He started deejaying as DJ Marfox in 2002.

In 2005, together with DJ Pausas and DJ Fofuxo, he founded DJs do Guetto and a year later they released DJs do Ghetto Vol. I, a digital compilation made up of 37 tracks, onto eMule. This compilation, which has since been re-issued as a free download by Príncipe Discos, has been viewed as the foundational release of the ghetto sound of Lisbon.

His first solo album, Eu sei quem Eu Sou (I Know Who I Am), released by Príncipe Discos in early 2011, was described by Philip Sherburne as “an atomic field of taut drums, hiccupping yelps, zapping synths and pinprick details."

In 2014, DJ Marfox released an EP called Lucky Punch on Lit City Trax and performed on the Red Bull Music Academy in New York, as well as in the Warm Up—the live music concerts curated by MoMA PS1. According to Cedar Pasori, DJ Marfox's participation in MoMA PS1's highly acclaimed experimental electronic music series, which took place on 30 August 2014, "reinforced the accelerating spread of Afro-Portuguese dance music around the world." The album Lucky Punch was listed as one of DAZED's top ten albums for August 2014. In between the aforementioned performances, the Rolling Stone magazine included him in their list of "10 New Artists You Need to Know".

One of the first international collaborations of the Portuguese DJ and producer was a rework of tUnE-yArDs' song "Water Fountain" featuring Brazilian band Pearls Negras.

On 13 March 2015 the British independent record label WARP announced the release on 7 April of a new EP called Cargaa 1 featuring DJ Marfox as the central figure of what MR P describes as the "cream-of-the-crop purveyors of Lisbon's thrilling electronic dance scene".

A compilation of songs crafted in the artist's bedroom from 2005 to 2008 was launched as a CD as well as free download under the name Revolução 2005–2008 on March 16, 2015.

DJ Marfox released an EP in April 2016 titled Chapa Quente, featuring such songs as Tarraxo Everyday.

== Discography ==
=== Albums & EPs ===
- Eu sei quem Eu sou (Príncipe, 2011) – reviewed by Philip Sherburne/Resident Advisor
- Artist Unknown (Pollinaire, 2012) – reviewed by Philip Sherburne/SPIN
- Subliminar (Enchufada, 2013)
- Lucky Punch (Lit City Trax, 2014) – reviewed by Philip Sherburne/SPIN as well as Joe Muggs & Seb Wheeler/MixMag
- Revolução 2005–2008 (NOS, 2015)
- Chapa Cuente (Principe, 2015)

Songs featured in compilations:

- "Funk em Kuduro" – DJs do Guetto Vol. 1 first released in 2006; re-release in 2013 by Príncipe Discos.

=== Mixtapes ===
- Distortion Ass Mix – featured in SPIN 05.07.2012
- Dazed Digital (DJ Marfox Mix) – featured in DAZED DIGITAL 03.2014
- The Ghetto Sound of Lisbon – featured in Resident Advisor 10.03.2014
- MOMA PS1 Warm Up Mix – featured in Pitchfork 29.08.2014
