= Cahya =

Cahya is an Indonesian name. Notable people with the name include:

- Cahya Supriadi (born 2003), Indonesian footballer
- Syaiful Cahya (born 1992), Indonesian footballer
- Indah Cahya Sari Jamil (born 2002), Indonesian badminton player
- Komang Ayu Cahya Dewi (born 2002), Indonesian badminton player
- Hari Nur Cahya Murni (born 1961), Indonesian bureaucrat
