= Kenji Adachihara =

Japanese footballer

Personal information
- Full name: Kenji Adachihara
- Date of birth: 8 November 1984 (age 42)
- Place of birth: Sagamihara, Kanagawa, Japan
- Height: 1.76 m (5 ft 9 1/2 in)
- Position: Striker

Youth career
- 2000: Narashino High School
- 2001–2002: Ryustu Keizai University Kashiwa High School

Senior career*
Years	Team	Apps	(Gls)
2003–2006	Ryutsu Keizai University	32	(17)
2006–2007	Viancone Fukushima	20	(25)
2007–2008	Japan Soccer College	15	(6)
2008–2009	Albirex Niigata Singapore	28	(16)
2009–2011	Bontang	56	(32)
2011–2012	Persiba Balikpapan	32	(15)
2012–2013	Persib Bandung	32	(12)
2014	Persita Tangerang	22	(8)
- * Club domestic league appearances and goals as of 5 September 2014

Kenji Adachihara (足立原 健二, Adachihara Kenji; 8 November 1984) is a former Japanese footballer. He played for various clubs in Indonesia and Singapore throughout his career.

== Early life ==
Kenji was born in Sagamihara. He went to Narashino High School and Ryustu Keizai University Kashiwa High School.

== Career ==
Kenji made his debut for Persib against Persipura Jayapura on 13 January 2013.
