= Muhammad Ridwan =

Indonesian footballer

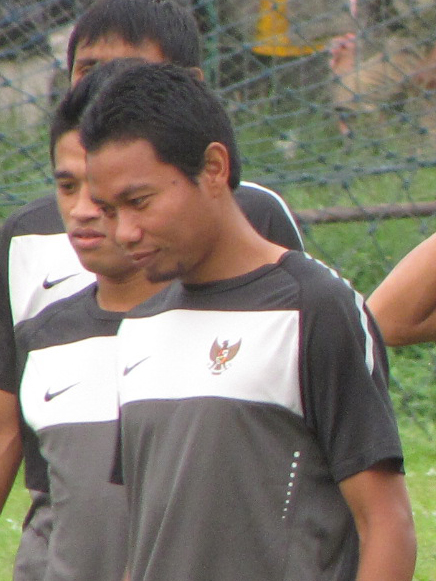
- Ridwan training with Indonesia in 2010

Personal information
- Full name: Muhammad Ridwan
- Date of birth: 8 July 1980 (age 46)
- Place of birth: Semarang, Indonesia
- Height: 1.72 m (5 ft 8 in)
- Position: Winger

Youth career
- PSIS Semarang

Senior career*
Years	Team	Apps	(Gls)
1999–2002	PSIS Semarang	50	(8)
2003–2004	Pelita Krakatau Steel	20	(4)
2004–2005	Persegi Gianyar	22	(7)
2005–2008	PSIS Semarang	72	(20)
2008–2010	Pelita Jaya	59	(12)
2010–2012	Sriwijaya	52	(8)
2012–2015	Persib Bandung	56	(15)
2015–2016	Sriwijaya	22	(1)
2016–2017	PSIS Semarang	15	(4)
Total		364	(79)

International career
2003	Indonesia U23	18	(5)
2006–2014	Indonesia	43	(5)
- * Club domestic league appearances and goals

Muhammad Ridwan (born 8 July 1980) is an Indonesian former professional footballer as a winger. Currently, he works as team manager PSIS Semarang.

== Personal life ==
Ridwan is Muslim and missed part of the 2014 Indonesia Super League because he was making his Hajj pilgrimage in September.

== International goals ==
Muhammad Ridwan: International goals
No.	Date	Venue	Opponent	Score	Result	Competition
1	21 November 2010	Gelora Sriwijaya Stadium, Palembang, Indonesia	Timor-Leste	1–0	6–0	Friendly
2	1 December 2010	Gelora Bung Karno Stadium, Jakarta, Indonesia	Malaysia	3–1	5–1	2010 AFF Suzuki Cup
3	4 December 2010	Gelora Bung Karno Stadium, Jakarta, Indonesia	Laos	2–0	6–0	2010 AFF Suzuki Cup
4	29 December 2010	Gelora Bung Karno Stadium, Jakarta, Indonesia	Malaysia	2–1	2–1	2010 AFF Suzuki Cup
5	28 July 2011	Gelora Bung Karno Stadium, Jakarta, Indonesia	Turkmenistan	4–1	4–3	2014 FIFA World Cup qualification

== Honours ==
PSIS Semarang

- Liga Indonesia First Division: 2001
- Liga Indonesia Premier Division runner up: 2006

Sriwijaya

- Indonesia Super League: 2011–12
- Indonesian Community Shield: 2010

Persib Bandung

- Indonesia Super League: 2014

Indonesia

- Indonesian Independence Cup: 2008
- AFF Championship runner-up: 2010
- Pestabola Merdeka runner-up: 2006
