= Herman Abanda =

Cameroonian footballer

Personal information
- Full name: Ahmad Herman Abanda
- Date of birth: 20 February 1984 (age 42)
- Place of birth: Yaoundé, Cameroon
- Height: 1.92 m (6 ft 4 in)
- Position: Defender

Senior career*
| Years | Team | Apps | (Gls) |
| 2001–2002 | Achille FC | 9 | (0) |
| 2002−2003 | Canon Yaoundé | 15 | (0) |
| 2004−2005 | PSM Makassar | 30 | (5) |
| 2006−2010 | Persija Jakarta | 112 | (20) |
| 2010–2011 | Persema Malang | 17 | (0) |
| 2011−2013 | Persib Bandung | 74 | (9) |
| 2014 | Barito Putera | 20 | (2) |
- * Club domestic league appearances and goals

Ahmad Herman Abanda (born 20 February 1984) is a Cameroonian former footballer who played as a defender. He spent the majority of his career playing in Indonesia for PSM Makassar, Persija Jakarta, Persema Malang, Persib Bandung and Barito Putera.

In 2013, Abanda converted to Islam while playing for Persib.

== Honours ==
Canon Yaoundé

- Elite One: 2002
