= Rudiyana =

Indonesian footballer

Personal information
- Full name: Rudiyana
- Date of birth: 4 May 1992 (age 34)
- Place of birth: Bandung, Indonesia
- Height: 5 ft 9 in (1.75 m)
- Position: Forward

Team information
- Current team: Adhyaksa Bekasi
- Number: 29

Youth career
- 2014–2015: Persib Bandung

Senior career*
Years	Team	Apps	(Gls)
2012	Persibat Batang	0	(0)
2013	PS Belitung Timur	5	(0)
2014–2016	Persib Bandung	3	(0)
2017	Persis Solo	19	(7)
2018	Persika Karawang	10	(3)
2018	Persis Solo	9	(2)
2019	PSIM Yogyakarta	8	(1)
2019	Sulut United	9	(2)
2020–2022	Sriwijaya	7	(1)
2022–2023	Persikab Bandung	5	(0)
2023–2024	Perserang Serang	18	(4)
2024–2025	PSKC Cimahi	16	(1)
2025–2026	PSMS Medan	21	(4)
2026–	Adhyaksa Bekasi	1	(0)
- * Club domestic league appearances and goals as of 12 September 2026

Rudiyana (born 4 May 1992) is an Indonesian professional footballer who plays as a forward for Championship club Adhyaksa Bekasi.

== Club career ==
He was promoted from Persib Bandung U-21 to Persib Bandung on 14 February 2014.

== Honours ==
=== Club ===
Persib Bandung

- Indonesia Super League: 2014
- Indonesia President's Cup: 2015
