= Muhammad Taufiq =

Indonesian footballer

Personal information
- Full name: Muhammad Taufiq
- Date of birth: 29 November 1986 (age 39)
- Place of birth: Tarakan, North Kalimantan, Indonesia
- Height: 1.67 m (5 ft 6 in)
- Position: Defensive midfielder

Team information
- Current team: Persekat Tegal
- Number: 8

Youth career
- 2003–2004: Assyabaab Surabaya

Senior career*
Years	Team	Apps	(Gls)
2005–2006	Persebaya Surabaya	15	(0)
2007	PSIM Yogyakarta	22	(1)
2008–2013	Persebaya Surabaya	130	(7)
2014–2016	Persib Bandung	46	(2)
2017–2022	Bali United	76	(3)
2022	→ Persik Kediri (loan)	15	(0)
2022–2024	Persik Kediri	12	(0)
2024–	Persekat Tegal	23	(0)

International career
2012–2017	Indonesia	16	(0)
- * Club domestic league appearances and goals as of 22:30, 8 May 2026 (UTC)

Muhammad Taufiq (born 29 November 1986) is an Indonesian professional footballer who plays as a defensive midfielder for Championship club Persekat Tegal.

== Personal life ==
Taufiq hails from Tarakan and is a devout Muslim.

== International career ==
He made his debut for Indonesia in 2014 FIFA World Cup qualification against Bahrain on 29 February 2012.

== Career statistics ==
=== International ===
As of match played 11 December 2017

Indonesia national team
Year	Apps	Goals
2012	8	0
2013	7	0
2017	1	0
Total	16	0

== Honours ==
Persebaya Surabaya

- Liga Indonesia First Division: 2006
- Liga Primer Indonesia: 2011
- Malaysia-Indonesia Unity Cup: 2011
- Indonesia Premier League runner-up: 2011–12

Persib Bandung

- Indonesia Super League: 2014
- Indonesia President's Cup: 2015

Bali United

- Liga 1: 2019
- Indonesia President's Cup runner-up: 2018
