= Hilton Moreira =

Brazilian footballer (born 1981)

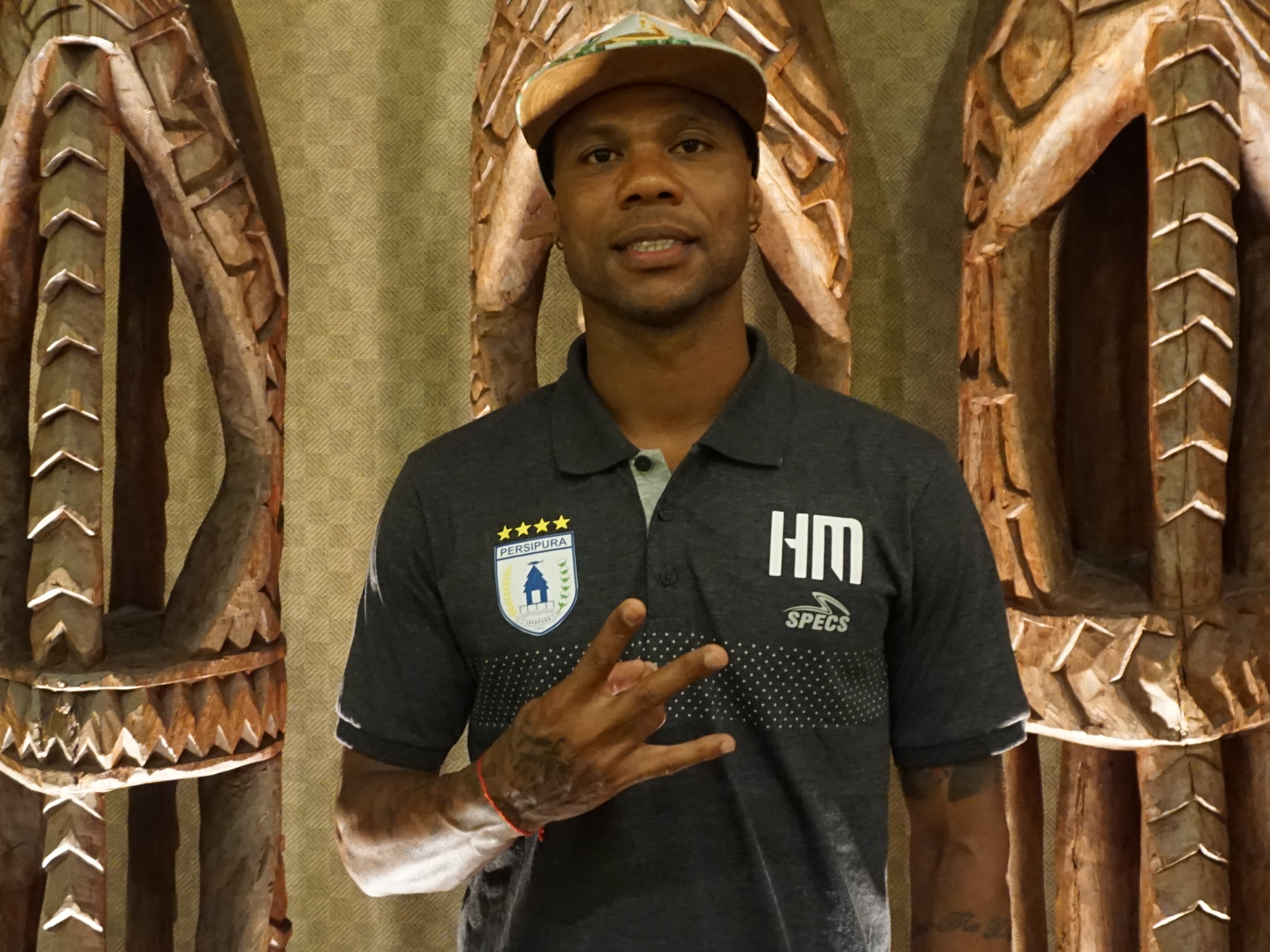
- Hilton with Persipura Jayapura in 2018

Personal information
- Full name: Hilton Thon Mauro Moreira
- Date of birth: 27 February 1981 (age 45)
- Place of birth: Pindamonhangaba, Brazil
- Height: 1.80 m (5 ft 11 in)
- Position: Forward

Team information
- Current team: Madura United (analyst coach)

Youth career
- 2000: São Paulo

Senior career*
Years	Team	Apps	(Gls)
2002–2005	Palmeiras B	16	(0)
2002–2003	→ XV de Piracicaba (loan)	27	(5)
2003	→ Atlético Goianiense (loan)	13	(6)
2004	→ São Bento (loan)	12	(0)
2004–2005	→ Anapolina (loan)	32	(16)
2005	Deltras Sidoarjo	47	(22)
2006	Mixto	5	(0)
2007–2008	Deltras Sidoarjo	18	(8)
2008–2011	Persib Bandung	68	(28)
2011–2013	Sriwijaya	41	(26)
2013	Persib Bandung	14	(4)
2013–2016	Penang	16	(8)
2016–2017	Sriwijaya	50	(17)
2018–2019	Persipura Jayapura	29	(11)
2019	Sriwijaya	0	(0)
Total		388	(151)
- * Club domestic league appearances and goals

Hilton Thon Mauro Moreira (born 27 February 1981), also known as Thon Moreira or Thon Thomas, is a Brazilian professional football coach and former player who played as a forward. He is currently the analyst coach of Super League club Madura United.

== Honours ==
Sriwijaya

- Indonesia Super League: 2011–12
