= Tantan (footballer) =

Indonesian footballer (born 1982)

Personal information
- Full name: Tantan Dzalikha
- Date of birth: 6 August 1982 (age 44)
- Place of birth: Lembang, Indonesia
- Height: 1.68 m (5 ft 6 in)
- Position: Forward

Youth career
- 1999: SSB Elput
- 2000: SSB Putra Lembang

Senior career*
Years	Team	Apps	(Gls)
2000–2002	Persilat Central Lampung	16	(8)
2002–2009	Persikab Bandung	95	(43)
2004–2005	→ Persibo Bojonegoro (loan)	22	(4)
2009–2011	Persitara North Jakarta	52	(21)
2011–2012	Persitara Batavia Union	31	(11)
2012–2013	Sriwijaya	32	(9)
2014–2016	Persib Bandung	63	(3)
2019	Bandung United	17	(1)
2020	PSKC Cimahi	10	(0)
Total		338	(100)

International career
2013–2015	Indonesia	5	(0)
- * Club domestic league appearances and goals

Tantan Dzalikha (born 6 August 1982) is an Indonesian former footballer who played as a forward.

== Career ==
Tantan joined Sriwijaya from Persitara Batavia Union at the start of the 2013 season. On 1 March 2013 he scored a hat-trick in a 4–3 win against Gresik United.

== International career ==
Tantan won his first cap for Indonesia in a friendly match against Kyrgyzstan on 1 November 2013, where he played as a substitute in a 4–0 win.

=== National team ===
Indonesia national team
Year	Apps	Goals
2013	1	0
2014	2	0
2015	2	0
Total	5	0

== Honours ==
=== Club ===
Persibo Bojonegoro

- Second Division: 2004

Sriwijaya FC

- Indonesian Inter Island Cup: 2012

Persib Bandung

- Indonesia Super League: 2014
- Indonesia President's Cup: 2015
