= Djibril Coulibaly (footballer, born 1987) =

Malian professional footballer

Personal information
- Full name: Djibril Coulibaly
- Date of birth: 11 August 1987 (age 39)
- Place of birth: Bamako, Mali
- Height: 1.75 m (5 ft 9 in)
- Position: Striker

Team information
- Current team: CO de Bamako
- Number: 12

Senior career*
| Years | Team | Apps | (Gls) |
| 2006–2007 | Real Bamako | 19 | (10) |
| 2007–2008 | Stade Malien | 23 | (18) |
| 2008–2012 | Fakel Chervonograd | 46 | (29) |
| 2011–2012 | Jeanne D'Arc | 23 | (19) |
| 2013 | Barito Putera | 29 | (21) |
| 2014 | Persib Bandung | 19 | (12) |
| 2015–2016 | Onez Createur | 31 | (26) |
| 2016 | Persija Jakarta | 1 | (0) |
| 2017– | CO de Bamako | 1 | (0) |

International career
| 2005 | Mali U-17 | 2 | (0) |
- * Club domestic league appearances and goals

Djibril Coulibaly (born 11 August 1987) is a Malian professional footballer who plays as a forward for CO de Bamako.

== Career ==
In his early career, he played for Real Bamako, Al-Ahli, Fakel Chervonograd and Jeanne D'Arc.

=== Barito Putra ===
In November 2012, he was signed with Brito Putra where he dominated the Indonesia league with his great goals scoring ability winning the league top scorer.

=== Persib Bandung ===
In November 2013, he was signed with Persib. He was part of the team that won the 2014 Indonesia Super League. He was released on November 10, 2014.

=== Persija Jakarta ===
In September 2016, he was signed with Persija Jakarta. He is expected to join Persija Jakarta until this season finish.

=== CO de Bamako ===
In 2017. Coulibaly, joined to malian football club CO de Bamako.

== Honors ==
Persib Bandung

- Indonesia Super League: 2014

=== Individual ===
- Best Foreign Striker Indonesia Super League

== Personal life ==
Coulibaly is Muslim who observes the Islamic month of Ramadan.
