= Robertino Pugliara =

Argentine footballer

Personal information
- Full name: Robertino Gabriel Pugliara
- Date of birth: 21 February 1984 (age 42)
- Place of birth: Buenos Aires, Argentina
- Height: 1.70 m (5 ft 7 in)
- Position: Attacking midfielder

Senior career*
Years	Team	Apps	(Gls)
2004–2005	San Lorenzo	20	(0)
2005–2007	Talleres de Córdoba	32	(4)
2007–2009	Persija Jakarta	50	(8)
2009–2011	Persiba Balikpapan	57	(9)
2011–2013	Persija Jakarta	60	(10)
2014	PSM Makassar	25	(2)
2014–2016	Persipura Jayapura	24	(4)
2016	Persib Bandung	8	(2)
2017	Persipura Jayapura	0	(0)
2017–2018	Pune City	2	(0)
2018	Persebaya Surabaya	22	(1)
Total		300	(40)
- * Club domestic league appearances and goals

Robertino Gabriel Pugliara (born 21 February 1984 in Buenos Aires) is an Argentine former professional footballer who played as a midfielder.
