= Agung Pribadi =

Indonesian footballer

Personal information
- Full name: Muhammad Agung Pribadi
- Date of birth: 23 July 1989 (age 37)
- Place of birth: Bandung, Indonesia
- Height: 1.71 m (5 ft 7 in)
- Positions: Defensive midfielder; right-back

Youth career
- 2004–2010: Persib Bandung

Senior career*
Years	Team	Apps	(Gls)
2010–2018	Persib Bandung	39	(0)
2017–2018	→ Persela Lamongan (loan)	36	(2)
2019	PSIM Yogyakarta	11	(0)
2020–2021	PSKC Cimahi	10	(0)
2021	RANS Cilegon	5	(0)
2022	Bekasi City	6	(0)
2023–2024	Persela Lamongan	7	(0)
2024–2025	PSKC Cimahi	12	(0)
2025–2026	Persitara North Jakarta	14	(0)
- * Club domestic league appearances and goals as of 25 January 2026

Muhammad Agung Pribadi (born 23 July 1989) is an Indonesian professional footballer who plays as a defensive midfielder or right-back. He had previously played for Persib Bandung U-21, and won the Indonesia Super League U-21 with the club in 2009.

== Club career ==
=== Early career ===
He joined and rose through the junior team of hometown club Persib Bandung from 2004 until 2010. He was part of the team that won the 2009-10 Indonesia Super League U-21 and as third place in the 2008–09 Indonesia Super League U-21.

=== Persib Bandung ===
He was promoted to the senior squad in 2010. He made his first-team debut for Persib Bandung when he was part of the starting lineup of a 2010–11 Indonesia Super League match against Sriwijaya on 2 January 2011, in which Persib lose.

On 28 November 2014, he signed a new one-year contract until the end of 2015. In the 2014 Indonesia Super League, he helped Persib to the championship, although he not play in the final against Persipura Jayapura.

==== Persela Lamongan (loan) ====
In the 2016 Indonesia Soccer Championship A, in the competition second round, He was loaned to Persela Lamongan from Persib Bandung. In the 2017 Liga 1 season, he returned to Persela on loan for the second time.

He made his official league debut for Persela Lamongan when he was part of the starting lineup of a 2017 Liga 1 match against Badak Lampung on 13 May 2017, in which Persela draw.

=== PSIM Yogyakarta ===
In 2019, Agung Pribadi signed a contract with Indonesian Liga 2 club PSIM Yogyakarta.

=== PSKC Cimahi ===
He was signed for PSKC Cimahi to play in Liga 2 in the 2020 season. This season was suspended on 27 March 2020 due to the COVID-19 pandemic. The season was abandoned and was declared void on 20 January 2021.

=== RANS Cilegon ===
He was signed for RANS Cilegon to play in the second round of Liga 2 in the 2021 season. Agung Pribadi made his debut on 15 December 2021 in a match against Persis Solo at the Pakansari Stadium, Cibinong.

=== Bekasi City ===
On 6 June 2022, it was announced that Agung Pribadi would be joining Bekasi City for the 2022-23 Liga 2 campaign.

== Honours ==
=== Club ===
Persib Bandung U-21

- Indonesia Super League U-21: 2009–10

Persib Bandung

- Indonesia Super League: 2014
- Indonesia President's Cup: 2015

RANS Cilegon

- Liga 2 runner-up: 2021
