= I Made Wirawan =

Indonesian footballer

Personal information
- Date of birth: 1 December 1981 (age 44)
- Place of birth: Gianyar, Indonesia
- Height: 1.80 m (5 ft 11 in)
- Position: Goalkeeper

Youth career
- Persegi Gianyar

Senior career*
Years	Team	Apps	(Gls)
2002–2004	Perseden Denpasar	38	(0)
2004–2006	Persekaba Badung	45	(0)
2006–2012	Persiba Balikpapan	150	(0)
2012–2023	Persib Bandung	132	(0)
2026	Persib Bandung	0	(0)
Total		365	(0)

International career
2011–2015	Indonesia	11	(0)

Managerial career
- 2023–: Persib Bandung (goalkeeper coach)
- * Club domestic league appearances and goals

I Made Wirawan (born 1 December 1981) is an Indonesian professional football coach and former player who played as a goalkeeper. He is currently goalkeeping coach of Super League club Persib Bandung. Wirawan made 11 appearances for the Indonesia national team.

== International career ==
His first cap for Indonesia was in a friendly match at Shah Alam Stadium, Shah Alam against Saudi Arabia on 7 October 2011.

== Personal life ==
Wirawan was born in Gianyar.

He is married to Rucika Kalra, and the couple have one son named Putu Ranwir Abhinava who was born on 16 July 2013 in Bandung.

He is a practicing Hindu.

== Career statistics ==
Appearances and goals by national team and year
National team	Year	Apps	Goals
Indonesia	2011	1	0
Indonesia	2012	0	0
Indonesia	2013	5	0
Indonesia	2014	3	0
Indonesia	2015	2	0
Total		11	0

== Honours ==
Persib Bandung

- Super League: 2014, 2025–26
- Piala Presiden: 2015

Individual

- FWP Award 2019: Player Of The Year
