= Cecep Supriatna =

Indonesian footballer

Personal information
- Full name: Cecep Supriatna
- Date of birth: November 6, 1975 (age 51)
- Place of birth: Bandung, Indonesia
- Height: 1.72 m (5 ft 7 1/2 in)
- Position: Goalkeeper

Senior career*
Years	Team	Apps	(Gls)
1994–2002	Persib Bandung	18	(0)
2002–2003	Persijatim	20	(0)
2004–2014	Persib Bandung	19	(0)
2014–2018	PSGC Ciamis	45	(0)
- * Club domestic league appearances and goals as of 23 April 2015

Cecep Supriatna (born 6 November 1975) is an Indonesian former footballer who plays as a goalkeeper.

== Career ==
Supriatna was one of the senior players in Persib whom he joined in 1994. He was one of the most loyal player for Persib and played most of his career in Persib only moving for one season to Persijatim Solo FC in 2002 before returning in 2004 and going to PSGC Ciamis in 2014. He was the oldest player for Persib during the 2013 Indonesia Super League. He announced that the 2013 Indonesia Super League will be his last season as a professional footballer. As per 2014, he moved to PSGC Ciamis, a club from lower division.
