= Glenn Sugita =

Indonesian businessman (born 1968)

- Born: Glenn Timothy Sugita; 28 March 1968 (age 58); Bandung, Indonesia
- Education: Tennessee Technological University (BS, MS)
- Occupations: Co-founder and managing partner of Northstar Group; CEO of PT Persib Bandung Bermartabat
- Awards: 4x Super League champion

Glenn Timothy Sugita (born 28 March 1968) is an Indonesian businessman who is the co-founder and managing partner of Northstar Group. He is also involved with football club Persib Bandung as CEO of PT Persib Bandung Bermartabat, the limited company which owns the club. As of 2022, IDX Channel estimated his net worth to be US$2 billion.

== Early life ==
Sugita had lived his life in Bandung from his youth up until his time in high school, during which he had represented West Java in National Sports Week playing tennis. After graduating high school, he attended the Tennessee Technological University where he earned a BS in 1991 and a MS in 1993 from its electrical engineering program.

== Business career ==
After receiving his master's degree, Sugita began working for AT&T Network Systems in 1994. After a year, he would move to Bahana Securities in 1995, taking a vice president role for five years. He followed that with a similar role at PwC Securities in 2000, holding the position for three years.

In 2003, Sugita co-founded Northstar Pacific along with former investment banker Patrick Walujo. Along with its foundation, he would take on the role of managing partner and being a member of its investment committee. Originally a merchant bank dealing with principal investments and corporate finance advisory services based in Jakarta, it became a private equity firm after receiving backing from American firm TPG Capital in 2006 and now being based in Singapore.

Sugita also had a tenure as vice president commissioner of PT Sumber Alfaria Trijaya Tbk from 2006 to 2010. He also formerly had stints as a board member at Trikomsel Oke (from 2009 to 2016), Centrin Online (from 2017 to 2021) and Multistrada Arah Sarana.

== Involvement with Persib Bandung ==
Sugita became involved with Persib Bandung as the club was in the midst of a financial crisis in 2009. The 2009–10 Indonesia Super League season required clubs to source its funds outside of regional government funds and their newly formed limited company, PT Persib Bandung Bermartabat (PT PBB), could not meet the deposit of Rp10 billion required to compete by July 2009. He formed a consortium at the club which included Pieter Tanuri, Kiki Barki, Erick Thohir and Patrick Waluyo. As its representative, he gathered major sponsors from various businesses for Persib.

Sugita became CEO of PT PBB in 2011. His tenure has seen him recruit Teddy Tjahjono as sporting director replacing Adi Widjaya and oversaw the club's long-term management of Gelora Bandung Lautan Api Stadium as its home stadium. He was also main commissioner of Liga Indonesia Baru, the company which organized football competitions in Indonesia for two years before resigning on 18 February 2019 having sent a resignation letter earlier on 2 October 2018 to focus more on his club management. He returned to the company, renamed I-League, as commissioner in 8 July 2025.

As CEO, Sugita has overseen Persib winning four league titles, including three titles in a row from 2023–24 to 2025–26.
