= Sergio van Dijk =

Indonesian footballer

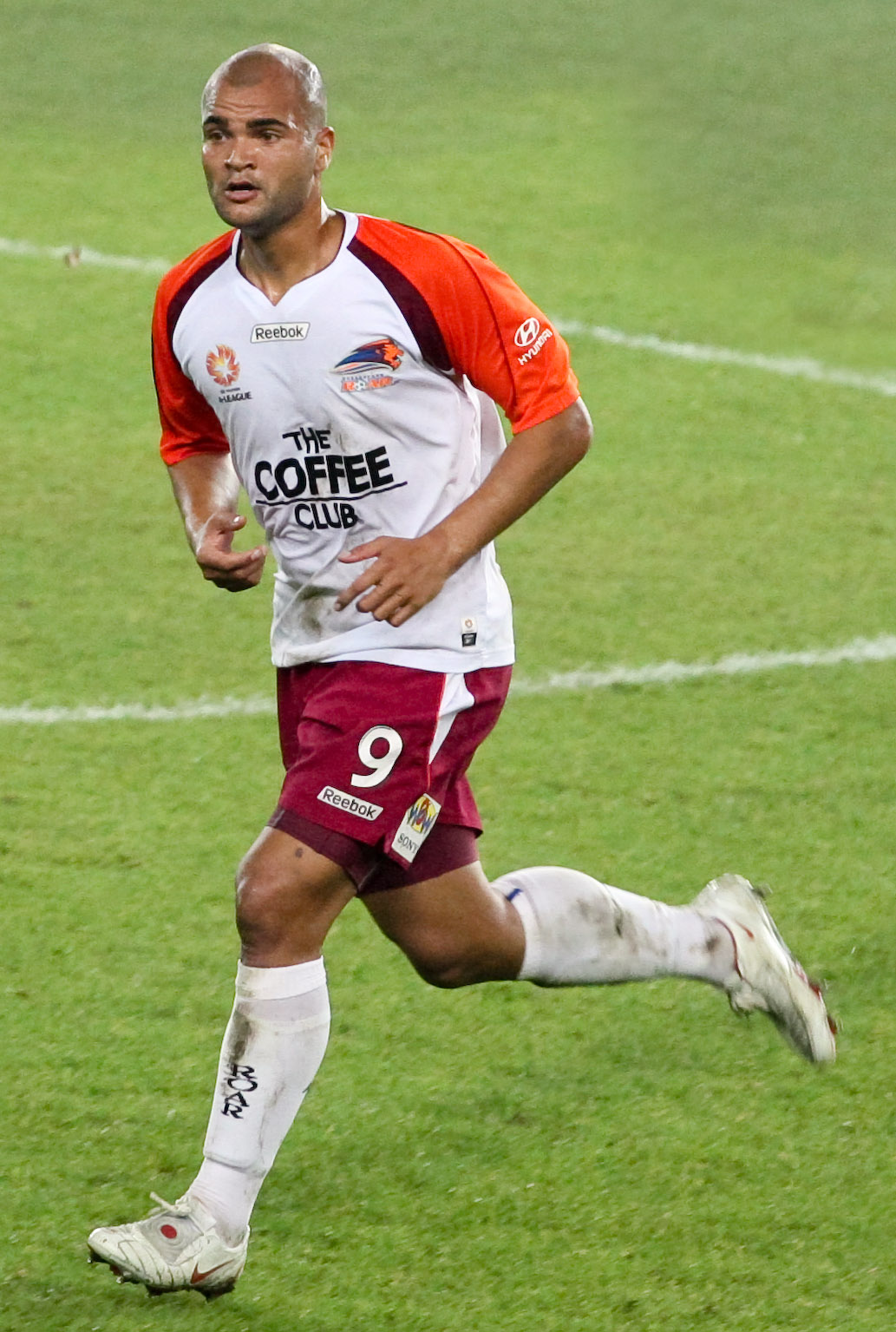
- Van Dijk playing for Brisbane Roar in 2008

Personal information
- Full name: Serginho van Dijk
- Date of birth: 6 August 1982 (age 44)
- Place of birth: Assen, Netherlands
- Height: 1.85 m (6 ft 1 in)
- Position: Striker

Youth career
- –1996: LTC Assen
- 1996–1999: Groningen

Senior career*
Years	Team	Apps	(Gls)
2000–2002	Groningen	2	(1)
2002–2005	Helmond Sport	82	(12)
2005–2008	Emmen	110	(40)
2008–2010	Brisbane Roar	47	(24)
2010–2012	Adelaide United	53	(24)
2013–2014	Persib Bandung	29	(21)
2014	Sepahan	7	(1)
2014–2015	Suphanburi	40	(17)
2016	Adelaide United	0	(0)
2016–2017	Persib Bandung	26	(12)
2018–2020	VV Pelikaan-S		
Total		396	(152)

International career
2013–2014	Indonesia	6	(1)
- * Club domestic league appearances and goals

Serginho "Sergio" van Dijk (born 6 August 1982) is a former professional footballer who played as a striker. He was the top goal scorer in the 2010–11 A-League regular season and made a name for himself in Australian football for his prolific scoring tally. Born in the Netherlands, he played for the Indonesia national team.

== Early life ==
Van Dijk was named after the Brazilian star, Serginho Chulapa, who played for Brazil during the 1982 World Cup. His mother was a big fan of Brazil at the time. Van Dijk is of Dutch-Indonesian parentage.

== Club career ==
=== Netherlands ===
Van Dijk started his career at local club LTC in Assen before he was drafted into the FC Groningen youth academy. In the 2000–01 season he played two matches (one goal) for Groningen in the Eerste Divisie, helping them to gain promotion. In the Eredivisie he did not play for Groningen and he moved back to the Eerste Divisie with Helmond Sport in 2002. In 2005, he moved to FC Emmen, where he scored 18 and 12 goals in his first two seasons. In the 2007–08 season he played at Emmen alongside his brother Danny.

=== Brisbane Roar ===
On 16 June 2008, Van Dijk signed a two-year contract with Queensland Roar (now operating as Brisbane Roar) after impressing the Roar scouts with his technique at the end of May against Redlands United and a Gold Coast Select XI.

Van Dijk started off the season slowly, only scoring one goal in his first ten matches although managing six assists at the time. However he then silenced the critics by scoring nine goals in as many matches (including a brace against the Central Coast Mariners). On 17 January 2009, van Dijk was the Roar's first ever player to score a hat-trick in their 3–1 win over Sydney FC.

=== Adelaide United ===
On 11 February 2010, Van Dijk signed for Adelaide United on a six-month contract for the club's AFC Champions League campaign, and made his debut against defending Asian champions, Pohang Steelers on 24 February 2010, in a 1–0 win at Hindmarsh Stadium. Van Dijk made his scoring debut for the Reds in their 2–0 away win against Shandong Luneng on matchday 2 of the Champions League campaign.

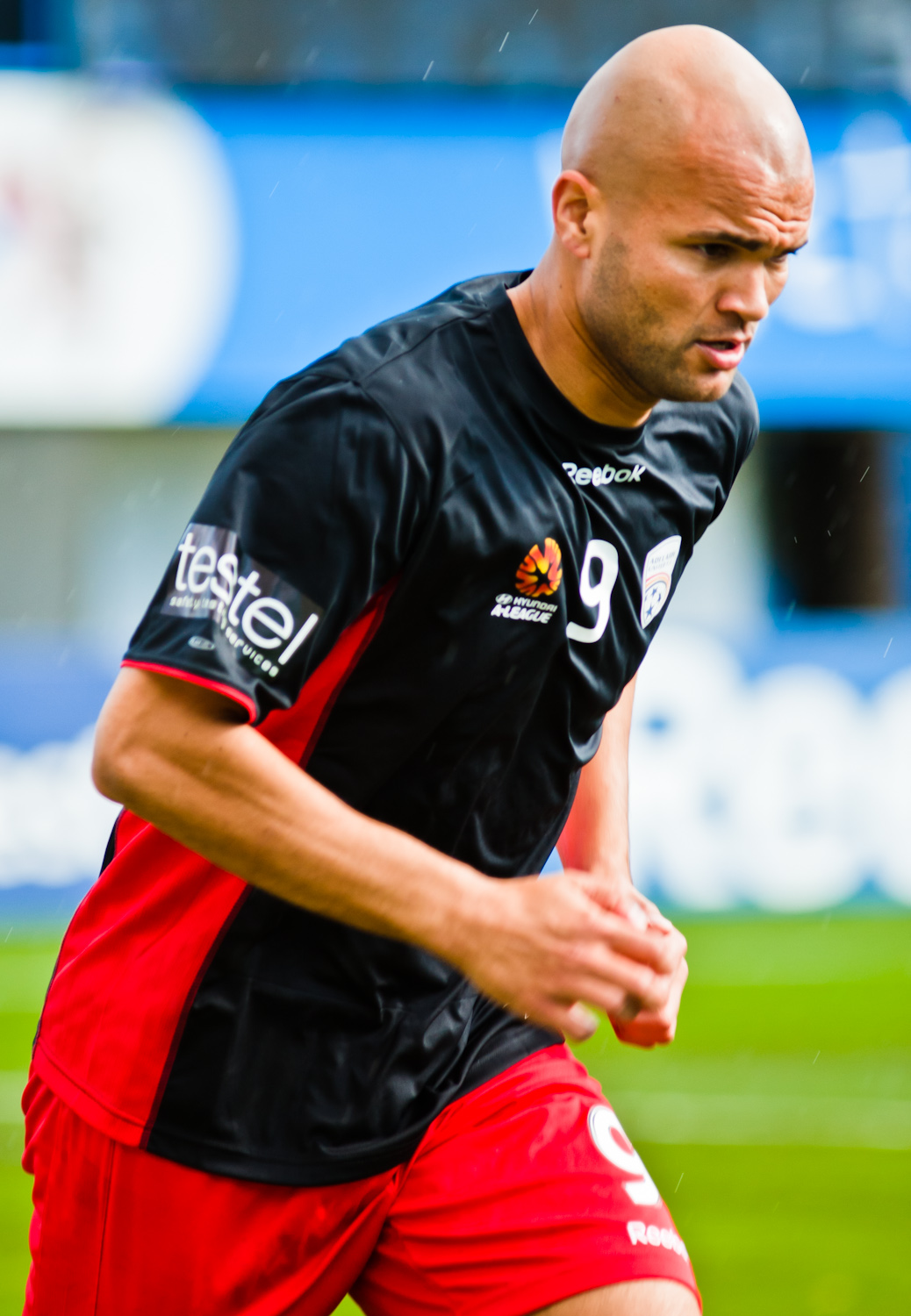
Sergio van Dijk warming up with Adelaide United before an A-League Round 2 game against the Central Coast Mariners

On 14 March 2010, van Dijk agreed to a three-year contract with Adelaide United. On 21 January 2011, he scored a hat-trick in the team's 8–1 win over North Queensland Fury. He won the Golden Boot award for the 2010–11 season with 16 goals.

Van Dijk was released from Adelaide United in January 2013.

=== Persib Bandung ===
In February 2013 van Dijk signed for Indonesian Super League club Persib Bandung. He scored on his debut in a 2–1 loss to Persisam Samarinda. On 3 March, he scored again twice, in a 3–1 win over Persija Jakarta.

=== Sepahan ===
Van Dijk signed a contract with Sepahan in December 2013, effective from 1 January 2014 to play for the team in the Iran Pro League and AFC Champions League.

=== Suphanburi ===
On 30 June 2014, van Dijk signed for Thai Premier League club Suphanburi, for a two-year contract.

=== Adelaide United ===
After two productive seasons with Suphanburi, van Dijk returned to former club Adelaide United as their Asian player for the 2016 AFC Champions League campaign. On 9 February 2016, he made his sole appearance for Adelaide in their short-lived campaign, coming off the bench as a substitute against Shandong Luneng, in the third qualifying round play-off at Hindmarsh Stadium. Despite receiving a raucous reception from the home crowd, and producing a strong performance reminiscent of his previous spell with Adelaide, van Dijk and the Reds were barrelled out of the competition, 2–1, bringing van Dijk's contract to an end.

=== Persib Bandung ===
After being clubless and trained with his former club FC Emmen, he finally decided to come back to Persib Bandung and was re-united with former Adelaide United colleague Marcos Flores. Due to an injury he made only four league appearances.

=== VV-Pelikaan-S ===
Van Dijk joined the Dutch league amateur club VV-Pelikaan-S.

== International career ==
On 19 July 2010, it was reported that van Dijk was to declare for Indonesia, the country from originating one of his grandparents. However, upon meeting with the Indonesian football authorities, he learned that in order to be able to represent Indonesia, he must earn Indonesian citizenship and give up his Dutch citizenship, as Indonesia does not allow dual citizenship. He refused to decide his international future, citing that it is difficult for him to give up his Dutch citizenship because his wife and their families are Dutch. He eventually decided to revoke his Dutch citizenship in order to play for Indonesia. The Football Association of Indonesia announced that van Dijk was being naturalized, so that he could play in the 2014 FIFA World Cup qualification campaign. On 4 March 2013, he was called up for the first time, in a 2015 Asia Cup qualifier. He made his debut against Saudi Arabia on 23 March 2013.

== Personal life ==
Van Dijk has a young son, who lives with family in the Netherlands. Regarding his future in football, van Dijk has said, "...after all these years of being overseas, it's my eighth year now, I think it's also time to let the family choose what the future plans are."

Van Dijk also operates a clothing label with his brother Danny, called Sixlovesnine.

== Career statistics ==
=== Club ===
Appearances and goals by club, season and competition
Club's	Season	League			Cup		International		Other		Total	
Club's	Season	Division	Apps	Goals	Apps	Goals	Apps	Goals	Apps	Goals	Apps	Goals
Groningen	1999–2000	Eerste Divisie	2	1			–				2	1
Groningen	2000–01	Eredivisie	0	0			–				0	0
Groningen	2001–02	Eredivisie	0	0			–				0	0
Groningen	Total		2	1	0	0	0	0	0	0	2	1
Helmond Sport	2002–03	Eerste Divisie	23	0			–				23	0
Helmond Sport	2003–04	Eerste Divisie	32	8			–		6 (Note: Appearances in Eerste Divisie relegation play-offs)	1	38	9
Helmond Sport	2004–05	Eerste Divisie	27	4			–		5	0	32	4
Helmond Sport	Total		82	12	0	0	0	0	11	1	93	13
Emmen	2005–06	Eerste Divisie	38	18			–				38	18
Emmen	2006–07	Eerste Divisie	37	12			–				37	12
Emmen	2007–08	Eerste Divisie	35	10	1	0	–				36	10
Emmen	Total		110	40	1	0	0	0	0	0	111	40
Brisbane Roar (Note: "Queensland Roar" until the 2009–10 season)	2008–09	A-League	20	11	1	2			3 (Note: Appearances in A-League final series)	1	24	13
Brisbane Roar	2009–10	A-League	27	13					–		27	13
Brisbane Roar	Total		47	24	1	2	0	0	3	1	51	27
Adelaide United	2010–11	A-League	28	16			7	2	2	1	37	19
Adelaide United	2011–12	A-League	22	8			6	2	–		28	10
Adelaide United	2012–13	A-League	3	0			2	0	–		5	0
Adelaide United	Total		53	24	0	0	15	4	2	1	70	29
Persib Bandung	2013	Indonesian Super League	29	21					–		29	21
Sepahan	2013–14	Iran Pro League	7	1	0	0	4	1	–		11	2
Suphanburi	2014	Thai Premier League	14	3	0	0	0	0			14	3
Suphanburi	2015	Thai Premier League	26	14	0	0	0	0			26	14
Suphanburi	Total		40	17	0	0	0	0	0	0	40	17
Adelaide United	2016	A-League	0	0			1	0			1	0
Persib Bandung	2016	ISC A	23	12							23	12
Persib Bandung	2017	Liga 1	3	0							3	0
Persib Bandung	Total		26	12	0	0	0	0	0	0	26	12
Career total			396	152	2	2	20	5	16	3	434	162

=== International ===
Appearances and goals by national team and year
National team	Year	Apps	Goals
Indonesia	2013	3	0
Indonesia	2014	3	1
Total		6	1

Scores and results list Indonesia' goal tally first, score column indicates score after each van Dijk goal.

List of international goals scored by Sergio van Dijk
No.	Date	Venue	Opponent	Score	Result	Competition
1	11 November 2014	Gelora Bung Karno Stadium, Jakarta, Indonesia	Timor-Leste	1–0	4–0	Friendly

== Honours ==
Individual

- A-League Golden Boot: 2010–11
- A-League PFA Team of the Season: 2010–11

== See also ==
- List of Indonesia international footballers born outside Indonesia
