= Jajang Sukmara =

Indonesian footballer (born 1988)

Personal information
- Full name: Jajang Sukmara
- Date of birth: 18 November 1988 (age 37)
- Place of birth: Bandung, Indonesia
- Height: 1.70 m (5 ft 7 in)
- Position: Left-back

Team information
- Current team: Persibat Batang
- Number: 18

Youth career
- 2005–2006: Persib Bandung
- 2007: Saint Prima
- 2008–2009: Persib Bandung

Senior career*
Years	Team	Apps	(Gls)
2009–2011	PSGC Ciamis	29	(2)
2011–2017	Persib Bandung	58	(3)
2017–2018	PSMS Medan	16	(0)
2018	Barito Putera	11	(0)
2019	PSS Sleman	18	(0)
2020	PSCS Cilacap	0	(0)
2021–2023	Dewa United	26	(1)
2023–2024	PSIM Yogyakarta	2	(0)
2024–2025	Persibo Bojonegoro	12	(0)
2025–	Persibat Batang	7	(0)

International career^{‡}
2011	Indonesia U23	1	(0)
- * Club domestic league appearances and goals as of 28 February 2025 ‡ National team caps and goals as of 15 September 2011

Jajang "Jasuk" Sukmara (born 18 November 1988) is an Indonesian professional footballer who plays for Liga 4 club Persibat Batang.

== Honours ==
=== Club ===
Persib Bandung U-17

- Soeratin Cup: 2006

Persib Bandung

- Indonesia Super League: 2014
- Indonesia President's Cup: 2015

Dewa United

- Liga 2 third place (play-offs): 2021
