= Aang Suparman =

Indonesian footballer

Personal information
- Full name: Aang Suparman
- Date of birth: 21 September 1984 (age 42)
- Place of birth: Garut, Indonesia
- Height: 1.79 m (5 ft 10 in)
- Position: Centre-back

Team information
- Current team: Adhyaksa (assistant coach)

Senior career*
Years	Team	Apps	(Gls)
2008–2009	Persikab Bandung	0	(0)
2009–2010	Persiba Balikpapan	21	(0)
2010–2011	Persibo Bojonegoro	18	(0)
2012–2014	Persib Bandung	16	(0)
2014–2015	Gresik United	6	(0)
2016	Pusamania Borneo	21	(0)
2016–2017	Persela Lamongan	41	(1)
2018	Persika Karawang	9	(0)
2018	Persiba Balikpapan	10	(0)
2019	Bandung United	10	(0)
Total		152	(1)
- * Club domestic league appearances and goals

Aang Suparman (born 21 September 1984) is an Indonesian former professional footballer who played as a centre-back. He is the assistant coach for Liga 2 club Adhyaksa.

== Career ==
He joined Persib in 2012. On 4 June 2014, he joined Gresik United F.C. until the end of 2014.

== Honours ==
=== Club ===
Persibo Bojonegoro

- Piala Indonesia (1): 2012
