= Sigit Hermawan =

Indonesian footballer

Personal information
- Full name: Sigit Hermawan
- Date of birth: 25 October 1990 (age 36)
- Place of birth: Sumedang, Indonesia
- Height: 1.70 m (5 ft 7 in)
- Position: Forward

Youth career
- 2008−2010: Persib U-21
- 2010−2011: Persija U-21

Senior career*
Years	Team	Apps	(Gls)
2010–2011	Persija Jakarta	25	(0)
2011–2015	Persib Bandung	20	(0)
2015	→ PSGC Ciamis (loan)	6	(0)
2016	Persika Karawang	7	(0)
2016–2017	Perserang Serang	12	(0)
2018	Gresik United	27	(4)
2019	Persis Solo	4	(0)
2019–2020	PSGC Ciamis	8	(2)
- * Club domestic league appearances and goals

Sigit Hermawan (born October 25, 1990) is an Indonesian former professional footballer.

== Career ==
=== Persib Bandung ===
He made his debut for Persib Bandung against Persiba Balikpapan, playing seven minutes.

=== PSGC Ciamis ===
In January 2015, he was loaned to PSGC Ciamis from Persib Bandung.

== Club statistics ==
Club	Season	Super League		Premier Division		Piala Indonesia		Total	
Club	Season	Apps	Goals	Apps	Goals	Apps	Goals	Apps	Goals
Persija Jakarta	2010-11	0	0	-		-		0	0
Persib Bandung	2011-12	3	0	-		-		3	0
Persib Bandung	2013	1	0	-		-		1	0
Persib Bandung	2014	0	0	-		-		0	0
Total		4	0	-		-		4	0

== Honours ==
Persib Bandung U-21

Winner

- Indonesia Super League U-21: 2009−10

Persib Bandung

Winner

- Indonesia Super League: 2014
