= 2015 Persipasi Bandung Raya season =

Indonesian association football club season

Persipasi Bandung Raya
2015 season
- Chairman: Marco Gracia Paulo
- Head Coach: Dejan Antonić
- Stadium: Patriot Stadium
- Top goalscorer: League: David Laly (1 goal); All: David Laly (1 goal)

The 2015 Persipasi Bandung Raya season was the 26th season in the club's football history and the 3rd season competing in the Indonesia Super League as Pelita Bandung Raya.

== Review and events ==
They will play their home matches at Patriot Stadium. The 2015 Indonesia Super League was officially discontinued by PSSI on May 2, 2015 due to a ban by Imam Nahrawi, Minister of Youth and Sports Affairs, against PSSI to run any football competition.

== Matches ==
=== Legend ===
Win Draw Loss Postponed

=== Friendlies ===
Competition	Date	KO	Stadium	City	Opponent	Result^{1}	Attendance	Goalscorers		Source
Competition	Date	KO	Stadium	City	Opponent	Result^{1}	Attendance	PBR	Opponent	Source
	12 January 2015		H	Soreang	(Malaysia) Kuala Lumpur FA	1–1		Spasojević 38'	Choi H.Y. 50'	
	14 January 2015		A	Bandung	Tiki Taka FC	4–1		Hidayat; Alam; Spasojević	Goal	
	20 January 2015		A	Cimahi	Bareti Sari Ater	8–0		Aribowo; Hidayat; Rifan; Laly; Febrianto		
	21 February 2015		A	Parongpong	Persib Bandung U-21	2–0		Goal		
Bali Island Cup 2015	12 March 2015	20:00	A	Gianyar	Arema Cronus	0–2			Saragih 57'; Gonzáles 59'	
Bali Island Cup 2015	14 March 2015	15:00	A	Gianyar	Persiram Raja Ampat	2–0		Raharjo 29'; Hidayat 47'		
Bali Island Cup 2015	16 March 2015	20:00	A	Gianyar	Bali United Pusam F.C.	0–0				

=== Indonesia Super League ===
MD	Date	Kickoff	Venue	City	Opponent	Result^{1}	Attendance	Goalscorers		Ref.
MD	Date	Kickoff	Venue	City	Opponent	Result^{1}	Attendance	PBR	Opponent	Ref.
1	4 April 2015	21:00	A	Palembang	Sriwijaya FC	1–1	9,457	Laly 76'	Ljubojević 45'	
2	7 April 2015	15:15	A	Soreang	Persib Bandung	0–3	8,742		Atep 47'; Konaté 72'; Taufiq 84'	

== Squad ==
As of 9 April 2015

No.	Pos	Nat	Player	Total		Indonesia Super League	
No.	Pos	Nat	Player	Apps	Goals	Apps	Goals
1	GK	(Indonesia) IDN	Alfonsius Kelvan	0	0	0	0
3	DF	(Indonesia) IDN	Chairul Rifan	2	0	2	0
4	DF	(Indonesia) IDN	Mokhamad Syaifuddin	0	0	0	0
7	FW	(Indonesia) IDN	Yongki Aribowo	2	0	2	0
11	MF	(Indonesia) IDN	Agus Indra Kurniawan	0	0	0	0
12	GK	(Latvia) LAT	Deniss Romanovs	2	0	2	0
14	MF	(Indonesia) IDN	Muhammad Arsyad	0	0	0	0
16	DF	(Indonesia) IDN	Hermawan	2	0	2	0
18	MF	(Indonesia) IDN	Legimin Raharjo	2	0	2	0
19	MF	(Indonesia) IDN	Wawan Febrianto	2	0	2	0
21	GK	(Indonesia) IDN	Raden Galuh	0	0	0	0
23	MF	(Indonesia) IDN	Kim Kurniawan	2	0	2	0
24	DF	(Serbia) SRB	Boban Nikolić	2	0	2	0
30	DF	(Indonesia) IDN	Nova Arianto	2	0	2	0
42	DF	(Indonesia) IDN	Riyandi Ramadhana	1	0	1	0
86	DF	(Indonesia) IDN	Satrio Syam	2	0	2	0
77	FW	(Indonesia) IDN	Ghozali Muharam Siregar	1	0	1	0
91	MF	(Indonesia) IDN	David Laly	2	1	2	1
93	MF	(Indonesia) IDN	Dolly Gultom	0	0	0	0
94	MF	(Indonesia) IDN	Imam Pathuroman	2	0	2	0
99	FW	(Indonesia) IDN	Rachmad Hidayat	2	0	2	0
	FW	(Indonesia) IDN	Heri Susanto	0	0	0	0
	FW	(Indonesia) IDN	Syamsir Alam	0	0	0	0
	FW	(Indonesia) IDN	Andrea Bitar	0	0	0	0
	FW	(Argentina) ARG	Gastón Castaño	0	0	0	0

== Transfers ==
=== In ===
No.	Pos.	Name	Moving from	Type	Sources
7	FW	(Indonesia) Yongki Aribowo	Barito Putera	Free	
18	MF	(Indonesia) Legimin Raharjo	Gresik United	Free	
77	FW	(Indonesia) Ghozali Muharam Siregar	Pro Duta	Free	
86	DF	(Indonesia) Satrio Syam	Persita Tangerang	Free	
87	FW	(Montenegro) Ilija Spasojević	Putra Samarinda F.C.	Free	
99	FW	(Indonesia) Rachmad Hidayat	Pro Duta	Free	
	FW	(Indonesia) Syamsir Alam	Sriwijaya F.C.	Free	
	FW	(Indonesia) Andrea Bitar		Free	
	FW	(Argentina) Gaston Castaño		Free	

=== Out ===
No.	Pos.	Name	Moving to	Type	Sources
17	MF	(Indonesia) Rafid Lestaluhu	Persita Tangerang		
	DF	(Indonesia) Dias Angga Putra	Persib Bandung		
	DF	(Indonesia) Wildansyah	Sriwijaya F.C.		
	FW	(Indonesia) Bambang Pamungkas	Persija Jakarta		
	MF	(Indonesia) Anggo Yulian			
	MF	(Indonesia) Basri Lohy	Pusamania Borneo		
	FW	(Argentina) Gaston Castaño			
	FW	(Indonesia) Talaohu Musafri	Barito Putera		
	MF	(Indonesia) Rizky Pellu	Mitra Kukar		
	FW	(Montenegro) Ilija Spasojević	Persib Bandung		

== Notes ==
- 1.Kickoff time in UTC+07:00.
- 2.Kickoff time in UTC+08:00.
- 3.Kickoff time in UTC+09:00.
- 4.Persipasi Bandung Raya's goals first.
