= 2014 Pelita Bandung Raya season =

Pelita Bandung Raya
2014 season
- Chairman: Marco Paulo García
- Head coach: Dejan Antonić
- Stadium: Si Jalak Harupat, Soreang
- Indonesian Super League: Semi-finals
- Top goalscorer: League: Bambang Pamungkas (10); All: Bambang Pamungkas (10)
- Highest home attendance: 13,500 (v Persib Bandung, 30 October 2014)
- Lowest home attendance: 100 (v Gresik United, 26 May 2014)
- Average home league attendance: 2,533
Home colours	Away colours	Third colours

The 2014 season was the 25th season in Pelita Bandung Raya's history and the 2nd in the Indonesia Super League.

== Review and events ==
PBR hired Dejan Antonić to replace Darko Janacković. They promoted three players from their youth academy to the senior squad this season and also promoted Heri Susanto on 15 July 2014.

After beating Persita Tangerang 3–1 on 5 September 2014, PBR advanced to the second round of the ISL. Four days later, Antonić's contract was extended for a further two years.

On 30 October 2014, the final matchday of the second round, PBR defeated local rivals Persib Bandung 2–1 to reach the semi-finals, where they lost 2–0 to Persipura Jayapura on 4 November.

== Matches ==
=== Legend ===
Win Draw Loss Postponed

=== Friendlies ===
Date	KO	Stadium	City	Opponent	Result^{4}	Attendance	Goalscorers		Source
Date	KO	Stadium	City	Opponent	Result^{4}	Attendance	PBR	Opponent	Source
13 December 2013		H	Bandung	Bareti Sariater	4 – 0		Basri; K. Kurniawan; Chairul; Khoirul		
19 December 2013		H	Bandung	Porda Purwakarta	1 – 0		Nova 20'		
21 December 2013	8:30	H	Bandung	STKIP Pasundan	3 – 0		Talaohu; Wildansyah; Bambang		
7 January 2014		A	(Malaysia) Johor Bahru	(Malaysia) Johor Darul Ta'zim	1 – 1		Talaohu 43'	Safee 75'	
13 January 2014	19:00	H	Bandung	Persijap Jepara	1 – 1	756	Rizky 80'	Evaldo 28'	
14 January 2014	15:30	H	Bandung	Persita Tangerang	1 – 0	5,756	Castaño 65'		
16 January 2014	19:00	H	Bandung	Persib Bandung	0 – 1	22,457		Jufriyanto 68'	
24 January 2014		A	Ciamis	PSGC Galuh Ciamis	2 – 2		David 15'; Bambang 42'	Arif 20'; Rosian 90'	
5 March 2014	15:00	H	Bandung	PS Setia	3 – 0		Castaño; Bambang		
2 April 2014	15:00	H	Bandung	Persikab Bandung	5 – 0		Agus Indra 32'; Nikolić 33'; Dolly 55', 65'; Wawan 90'		
9 May 2014		H	Bandung	Saint Prima	12 – 0		K. Kurniawan; Basri; Riyandi; Agus Indra; Bambang; Dolly; Rafid; M. Arsyad; Wawan		
22 May 2014	21:00	H	Bandung	(Spain) Sevilla	0 – 4			Trochowski 7'; Iborra 13', 90'; Coke 60'	
10 July 2014		H	Bandung	Sunda Rasa Cianjur	3 – 0		David; Bambang		
17 July 2014		H	Bandung	Persigar Garut	5 – 0		Talaohu 20'; K. Kurniawan 30'; Agus Indra 51', 55'; Nunung 65'		
23 July 2014		H	Bandung	Bara Siliwangi	6 – 0		Bambang; Wildansyah; David; Anggo; Wawan		
4 August 2014		A	Yogyakarta	Sleman United	2 – 0		K. Kurniawan 4'; Bambang 9'		
6 August 2014		A	Yogyakarta	Persak Kentungan	3 – 0		Agus Indra 28'; Wawan 34'; Heri 65'		
19 September 2014		H	Bandung	Tiki Taka	8 – 0		Agus Indra 35', 37'; Wildansyah 40'; Talaohu 43', 60'; David 50'; K. Kurniawan 50'; Nunung 65'		
23 September 2014		H	Bandung	(Malaysia) Kedah	2 – 0		Bambang 52', 63'		
29 September 2014		H	Bandung	Bandung Sejati	11 – 1		Bambang 2', 39'; Talaohu 6', 20', 63'; K. Kurniawan 9'; Imam 35', 37'; David 43'; Wawan 61'; Fariz 78'	Indra 50'	

=== Indonesia Super League ===
==== First round ====
MD	Date	KO^{1}	Stadium	City	Opponent	Result^{4}	Attendance	Goalscorers		Source
MD	Date	KO^{1}	Stadium	City	Opponent	Result^{4}	Attendance	PBR	Opponent	Source
1	1 February	15:30	H	Bandung	Persita Tangerang	2 – 0	500	Nikolić 36'; Talaohu 51'		
2	6 February	15:30	H	Bandung	Sriwijaya	0 – 1	2,213		Vendry 47'	
3	9 February	15:30	A	Kediri	Persik Kediri	2 – 1	13,678	Agus Indra 12'; Rizky 47'	Boumsong 69'	
4	12 February	15:30	A	Jepara	Persijap Jepara	2 – 1	4,300	Castaño 4', 38'	Danial 60'	
5	17 February	15:30	H	Bandung	Persija Jakarta	2 – 2	1,000	Bambang 39', 55'	Bošnjak 71' (pen.); Hadi 81'	
6	21 February	19:00	H	Bandung	Semen Padang	1 – 1	500	Castaño 90+2'	Hendra 44'	
7	15 March	19:00^{2}	A	Martapura	Barito Putera	0 – 1	6,736		Lomell 69'	
8	19 April	19:00	A	Malang	Arema Malang	0 – 3	11,814		Beto 16', 80'; López 73'	
9	23 April	15:30	A	Gresik	Gresik United	0 – 0	1,255			
10	27 April	15:30	H	Bandung	Persib Bandung	1 – 0	9,000	Talaohu 48'		
11	20 May	15:30	A	Bandung	Persib Bandung	2 – 2	12,365	Wildansyah 45'; K. Kurniawan 70'	Tantan 33'; Sinaga 83'	
12	26 May	15:30	H	Bandung	Gresik United	4 – 1	100	David 16', 42'; Nova 75'; Wawan 90'	Dutra 61'	
13	31 May	15:30	H	Bandung	Arema Malang	0 – 1	1,500		Gonzáles 58'	
14	6 June	15:30	H	Bandung	Barito Putera	1 – 0	2,462	Nikolić 76'		
15	10 August	19:00	A	Padang	Semen Padang	1 – 2	5,524	Bambang 77'	Vizcarra 7'; Nur Iskandar 25'	
16	14 August	19:00	A	Jakarta	Persija Jakarta	1 – 1	19,837	Bambang 66'	Ponaryo 90'	
17	20 August	15:30	H	Bandung	Persik Kediri	3 – 2	534	Talaohu 10'; Chairul 40'; Dias Angga 50'	Faris 7'; Mamoun 88' (pen.)	
18	23 August	15:30	H	Bandung	Persijap Jepara	3 – 0	563	Bambang 42', 90+1'; Agus Indra 74'		
19	31 August	15:30	A	Palembang	Sriwijaya	2 – 1	3,529	Bambang 21', 84'	Koné 27'	
20	5 September	15:30	A	Karawang	Persita Tangerang	3 – 1	1,567	Bambang 55'; Talaohu 76', 86'	Adachihara 67'	

==== Second round ====
MD	Date	KO^{1}	Stadium	City	Opponent	Result^{4}	Attendance	Goalscorers		Source
MD	Date	KO^{1}	Stadium	City	Opponent	Result^{4}	Attendance	PBR	Opponent	Source
1	6 October	15:30	A	Bandung	Persib Bandung	0 – 1	13,500		Jufriyanto 54'	
2	10 October	15:30	H	Bandung	Bhayangkara F.C.	0 – 0	567			
3	14 October	19:00	A	Tenggarong	Mitra Kukar	0 – 1	1,519		Weeks 46'	
4	21 October	15:30	H	Bandung	Mitra Kukar	1 – 0	500	Bambang 73'		
5	26 October	19:00	A	Surabaya	Bhayangkara F.C.	1 – 1	2,246	Agus Indra 58'	Kenmogne 27'	
6	30 October	15:30	H	Bandung	Persib Bandung	2 – 1	13,500	K. Kurniawan 52'; Wawan 79'	Bambang 82' (o.g.)	

==== Knockout stage ====
RD	Date	KO^{1}	Stadium	City	Opponent	Result^{4}	Attendance	Goalscorers		Source
RD	Date	KO^{1}	Stadium	City	Opponent	Result^{4}	Attendance	PBR	Opponent	Source
Semi-final	4 November	15:30	A	Jakarta	Persipura Jayapura	0 – 2			Boaz 69', 71'	

== Squad ==
As of 4 November 2014

No.	Pos	Nat	Player	Total		Indonesia Super League	
No.	Pos	Nat	Player	Apps	Goals	Apps	Goals
1	GK	(Indonesia) IDN	Alfonsius Kelvan	0	0	0	0
2	DF	(Indonesia) IDN	Saddam Hi Tenang	0	0	0	0
3	DF	(Indonesia) IDN	Chairul Rifan	16	1	16	1
4	DF	(Indonesia) IDN	Mokhamad Syaifuddin	0	0	0	0
6	DF	(Indonesia) IDN	Dias Angga Putra	26	1	26	1
7	FW	(Indonesia) IDN	Rafid Lestaluhu	0	0	0	0
11	MF	(Indonesia) IDN	Agus Indra	17	3	17	3
12	GK	(Latvia) LAT	Deniss Romanovs	27	0	27	0
14	MF	(Indonesia) IDN	Muhammad Arsyad	0	0	0	0
16	DF	(Indonesia) IDN	Hermawan	23	0	23	0
19	FW	(Indonesia) IDN	Wawan Febrianto	20	2	20	2
20	FW	(Indonesia) IDN	Bambang Pamungkas	24	10	24	10
21	GK	(Indonesia) IDN	Raden Galuh	0	0	0	0
22	DF	(Indonesia) IDN	Wildansyah	23	1	23	1
23	MF	(Indonesia) IDN	Kim Kurniawan	26	2	26	2
24	DF	(Serbia) SRB	Boban Nikolić	22	2	22	2
29	FW	(Indonesia) IDN	Talaohu Musafri	27	5	27	5
30	DF	(Indonesia) IDN	Nova Arianto	17	1	17	1
32	FW	(Argentina) ARG	Gastón Castaño	11	3	11	3
42	DF	(Indonesia) IDN	Riyandi Ramadhana	5	0	5	0
47	MF	(Indonesia) IDN	Anggo Yulian	14	0	14	0
86	FW	(Indonesia) IDN	Basri Lohy	2	0	2	0
87	DF	(Indonesia) IDN	Fariz Bagus Dinata	0	0	0	0
88	MF	(Indonesia) IDN	Rizky Pellu	24	1	24	1
91	FW	(Indonesia) IDN	David Laly	27	2	27	2
93	DF	(Indonesia) IDN	Dolly Gultom	3	0	3	0
94	MF	(Indonesia) IDN	Imam Pathuroman	17	0	17	0
99	FW	(Indonesia) IDN	Nunung Dwi Cahyo	0	0	0	0
	FW	(Indonesia) IDN	Heri Susanto	0	0	0	0

== Transfers ==
=== In ===
No.	Pos.	Name	Moving from	Type	Sources
91	FW	(Indonesia) David Laly	Persidafon Dafonsoro	End of contract	
6	DF	(Indonesia) Dias Angga Putra	Persisam Putra Samarinda	End of contract	
1	GK	(Latvia) Deniss Romanovs	Pro Duta	End of contract	
23	MF	(Indonesia) Kim Kurniawan	Persema Malang	End of contract	
24	DF	(Serbia) Boban Nikolić	(Serbia) Pobeda Beloševac		
20	FW	(Indonesia) Bambang Pamungkas	Free Agent	Free	
21	GK	(Indonesia) Alfonsius Kelvan	Persepam Madura United	End of contract	
47	MF	(Indonesia) Anggo Yulian	Arema IPL	End of contract	
	MF	(Indonesia) Johan Juansyah	Persija Jakarta	End of contract	
	MF	(Indonesia) Khoirul Huda	Sriwijaya	End of contract	
3	DF	(Indonesia) Chairul Rifan	Arema IPL	End of contract	
86	FW	(Indonesia) Basri Lohy	Persepar Palangkaraya	End of contract	
87	DF	(Indonesia) Fariz Bagus Dinata	Arema IPL	End of contract	
16	DF	(Indonesia) Hermawan	Arema IPL	End of contract	
29	FW	(Indonesia) Talaohu Musafri	Perseman Manokwari	End of contract	
22	DF	(Indonesia) Wildansyah	Persisam Putra Samarinda	End of contract	
11	MF	(Indonesia) Agus Indra	Gresik United	End of contract	
	FW	(Indonesia) Heri Susanto	Pelita Bandung Raya U-21	Promotion to main team	
2	DF	(Indonesia) Saddam Hi Tenang	Arema IPL	End of contract	

=== Out ===
No.	Pos.	Name	Moving to	Type	Sources
	MF	(Indonesia) Eka Ramdani	Semen Padang	End of contract	
	GK	(Indonesia) Tema Mursadat		End of contract	
	DF	(Indonesia) Edi Hafid		End of contract	
	DF	(Indonesia) Nova Arianto		End of contract	
	DF	(Indonesia) Leonard Tupamahu		End of contract	
	MF	(Indonesia) Rendi Saputra		End of contract	
	GK	(Indonesia) Endang Subrata		End of contract	
	MF	(Indonesia) Asep Mulyana		End of contract	
	DF	(Indonesia) Jajang Mulyana		End of contract	
	FW	(Syria) Marwan Sayedeh		End of contract	
	MF	(South Korea) Park Kyung-min		End of contract	
	DF	(Croatia) Mijo Dadić		End of contract	
	MF	(Montenegro) Miljan Radović		End of contract	

== Statistics ==
=== Clean sheets ===
As of end of season.

Rnk	Pos	No.	Player	Indonesia Super League	Total
1	GK	12	(Latvia) Deniss Romanovs	7	7
Total				7	7

=== Disciplinary record ===
As of end of season.

Rnk	Pos.	No.	Player	ISL			Total		
Rnk	Pos.	No.	Player	Yellow card	(yellow card) (yellow-red card)	Red card	Yellow card	(yellow card) (yellow-red card)	Red card
1	DF	24	(Serbia) Boban Nikolić	8	1	0	8	1	0
2	DF	94	(Indonesia) Imam Pathuroman	8	0	0	8	0	0
3	DF	16	(Indonesia) Hermawan	5	2	0	5	2	0
4	DF	6	(Indonesia) Dias Angga Putra	6	0	0	6	0	0
5	DF	22	(Indonesia) Wildansyah	5	0	1	5	0	1
6	MF	23	(Indonesia) Kim Kurniawan	5	0	0	5	0	0
6	MF	88	(Indonesia) Rizky Pellu	5	0	0	5	0	0
8	MF	11	(Indonesia) Agus Indra	4	0	0	4	0	0
8	FW	91	(Indonesia) David Laly	4	0	0	4	0	0
10	GK	12	(Latvia) Deniss Romanovs	3	0	0	3	0	0
10	MF	47	(Indonesia) Anggo Yulian	3	0	0	3	0	0
12	FW	19	(Indonesia) Wawan Febrianto	2	0	0	2	0	0
12	DF	30	(Indonesia) Nova Arianto	2	0	0	2	0	0
12	FW	32	(Argentina) Gastón Castaño	2	0	0	2	0	0
15	FW	29	(Indonesia) Talaohu Musafri	1	0	0	1	0	0
15	DF	42	(Indonesia) Riyandi Ramadhana	1	0	0	1	0	0
15	DF	93	(Indonesia) Dolly Gultom	1	0	0	1	0	0
Total				65	3	1	65	3	1

=== Overview ===
As of end of season.

Games played	27 (27 Indonesia Super League)
Games won	22 (22 Indonesia Super League)
Games drawn	7 (7 Indonesia Super League)
Games lost	8 (8 Indonesia Super League)
Goals scored	34 (34 Indonesia Super League)
Goals conceded	27 (27 Indonesia Super League)
Goal difference	+7 (+7 Indonesia Super League)
Clean sheets	7 (7 Indonesia Super League)
Yellow cards	65 (65 Indonesia Super League)
Red cards	4 (4 Indonesia Super League)
Worst discipline	(Serbia) Boban Nikolić (8 (yellow card) , 1 (yellow card) (yellow-red card) )
Best result(s)	W 3 – 0 (H) v Persijap Jepara – Indonesia Super League – 23 August 2014
Worst result(s)	L 0 – 3 (A) v Arema Cronus – Indonesia Super League – 19 April 2014
Most appearances	(Indonesia) David Laly, (Latvia) Deniss Romanovs & (Indonesia) Talaohu Musafri (27 appearances)
Top scorer(s)	(Indonesia) Bambang Pamungkas (10 goals)
Top clean sheet(s)	(Latvia) Deniss Romanovs (7 clean sheets)

== Notes ==
- 1.Kickoff time in UTC+07:00.
- 2.Kickoff time in UTC+08:00.
- 3.Kickoff time in UTC+09:00.
- 4.PBR's goals first.
