= 2015 Indonesia President's Cup =

Tournament details
- Country: Indonesia
- Dates: 30 August – 18 October 2015
- Teams: 16

Final positions
- Champions: Persib
- Runners-up: Sriwijaya
- Third place: Arema Cronus
- Fourth place: Mitra Kukar

Tournament statistics
- Matches played: 38
- Goals scored: 94 (2.47 per match)
- Top goal scorer(s): Zulham Zamrun (6 goals)

Awards
- Best player: Zulham Zamrun

The 2015 Indonesia President's Cup (Indonesian: Piala Presiden 2015) was the first edition of the Indonesia President's Cup. The tournament was held to restore the atmosphere of Indonesian football which had been frozen by FIFA. The tournament was held from 30 August to 18 October 2015. The tournament was inaugurated by President Joko Widodo in Gianyar, Bali.

== Teams ==
The tournament was joined by 16 clubs: 13 from the Indonesia Super League and three from the Premier Division.

Club	2014 season	City/Regency	Province
Arema Cronus	Indonesia Super League semi-finals	Malang	East Java
Bali United	Indonesia Super League 6th in East Division (first round) (Note: As Putra Samarinda)	Gianyar	Bali
Gresik United	Indonesia Super League 9th in West Division (first round)	Gresik	East Java
Martapura	Liga Indonesia Premier Division semi-finals	Martapura	South Kalimantan
Mitra Kukar	Indonesia Super League 3rd in Group B (second round)	Tenggarong	East Kalimantan
Persebaya United	Indonesia Super League 4th in Group B (second round) (Note: As Persebaya ISL)	Surabaya	East Java
Persela	Indonesia Super League 4th in Group A (second round)	Lamongan	East Java
Persib	Indonesia Super League champions	Bandung	West Java
Persiba	Indonesia Super League 5th in East Division (first round)	Balikpapan	East Kalimantan
Persija	Indonesia Super League 5th in West Division (first round)	Jakarta	DKI Jakarta
Persipasi Bandung Raya	Indonesia Super League semi-finals (Note: As Pelita Bandung Raya)	Bekasi	West Java
Persita	Indonesia Super League 10th in West Division (first round)	Tangerang	Banten
PSGC	Liga Indonesia Premier Division semi-finals	Ciamis	West Java
PSM	Indonesia Super League 7th in East Division (first round)	Makassar	South Sulawesi
Pusamania Borneo	Liga Indonesia Premier Division champions	Samarinda	East Kalimantan
Sriwijaya	Indonesia Super League 6th in West Division (first round)	Palembang	South Sumatra

== Draw ==
The 16 teams were divided into four groups based on the draw results.

Group A
Pos	Team
A1	Persib (Host)
A2	Persebaya United
A3	Martapura
A4	Persiba

Group B
Pos	Team
B1	Arema Cronus (Host)
B2	Persela
B3	Sriwijaya
B4	PSGC

Group C
Pos	Team
C1	Bali United (Host)
C2	Mitra Kukar
C3	Persija
C4	Persita

Group D
Pos	Team
D1	PSM (Host)
D2	Persipasi Bandung Raya
D3	Gresik United
D4	Pusamania Borneo

== Venues ==
The group stage matches were played at four locations: Bandung, Malang, Gianyar and Makassar. The quarter-finals and semi-finals were played on a home-and-away system.

Bandung	Malang	Gianyar	Makassar
Si Jalak Harupat	Kanjuruhan	Kapten I Wayan Dipta	Andi Mattalatta
Capacity: 45,000	Capacity: 45,000	Capacity: 25,000	Capacity: 18,000
Si Jalak Harupat	Kanjuruhan	Kapten I Wayan Dipta	Andi Mattalatta
2015 Indonesia President's Cup is located in Indonesia

== Group stage ==
=== Group A ===
All games played in Si Jalak Harupat Stadium, Bandung Regency, West Java.

Pos	Team	Pld	W	D	L	GF	GA	GD	Pts	Qualification
1	Persib (H)	3	3	0	0	10	0	+10	9	Knockout stage
2	Persebaya United	3	1	1	1	4	3	+1	4	Knockout stage
3	Persiba	3	1	0	2	4	10	−6	3	
4	Martapura	3	0	1	2	2	7	−5	1	

Source: RSSSF
(H) Hosts
2 September 2015
15:00 UTC+7

Persebaya United	0–0	Martapura

Jalak Harupat Stadium, Bandung
2 September 2015
18:00 UTC+7

Persib	4–0	Persiba
Spasojević 9', 23'; Zamrun 74'; Tantan 90+1'

Jalak Harupat Stadium, Bandung

6 September 2015
15:00 UTC+7

Martapura	2–3	Persiba
Syaifullah 20'; Isnan Ali 90+'		Pradana 62', 70'; Solehudin 71'

Jalak Harupat Stadium, Bandung
6 September 2015
18:00 UTC+7

Persib	2–0	Persebaya United
Zulham 10'; Tantan 52'

Jalak Harupat Stadium, Bandung

10 September 2015
15:00 UTC+7

Persebaya United	4–1	Persiba
Velázquez 3', 26', 44', 80'		Pradana 15' (pen.)

Jalak Harupat Stadium, Bandung
10 September 2015
18:00 UTC+7

Persib	4–0	Martapura
Zulham 12', 42', 81'; Konaté 70'

Jalak Harupat Stadium, Bandung

=== Group B ===
All games played in Kanjuruhan Stadium, Malang Regency, East Java.

Pos	Team	Pld	W	D	L	GF	GA	GD	Pts	Qualification
1	Sriwijaya	3	2	0	1	4	3	+1	6	Knockout stage
2	Arema Cronus (H)	3	1	2	0	5	3	+2	5	Knockout stage
3	PSGC	3	0	2	1	2	3	−1	2	
4	Persela	3	0	2	1	2	4	−2	2	

Source: RSSSF
(H) Hosts
1 September 2015
15:00 UTC+7

Sriwijaya	1–0	PSGC
Syakir 24'

Kanjuruhan Stadium, Malang
1 September 2015
18:00 UTC+7

Arema Cronus	1–1	Persela Lamongan
Koné 90+3'		Diallo 6'

Kanjuruhan Stadium, Malang

5 September 2015
15:00 UTC+7

PSGC	1–1	Persela
Saha 19'		Salim 24'

Kanjuruhan Stadium, Malang
5 September 2015
18:00 UTC+7

Arema Cronus	3–1	Sriwijaya
Koné 10', 43'; Farizi 73'		Wanggai 47'

Kanjuruhan Stadium, Malang

9 September 2015
15:00 UTC+7

Sriwijaya	2–0	Persela
Wanggai 67' (pen.); Wildansyah 71'

Kanjuruhan Stadium, Malang
9 September 2015
18:00 UTC+7

Arema Cronus	1–1	PSGC
Arif 43' (pen.)		Saha 87' (pen.)

Kanjuruhan Stadium, Malang

=== Group C ===
All games played in Kapten I Wayan Dipta Stadium, Gianyar, Bali.

Pos	Team	Pld	W	D	L	GF	GA	GD	Pts	Qualification
1	Bali United (H)	3	2	1	0	7	3	+4	7	Knockout stage
2	Mitra Kukar	3	0	3	0	2	2	0	3	Knockout stage
3	Persita	3	0	2	1	2	3	−1	2	
4	Persija	3	0	2	1	1	4	−3	2	

Source: RSSSF
(H) Hosts
30 August 2015
16:00 UTC+8

Bali United	3–0	Persija
Sandi 8'; Samma 33'; Eliandry 45+1'

Kapten I Wayan Dipta Stadium, Gianyar
30 August 2015
19:00 UTC+8

Mitra Kukar	0–0	Persita

Kapten I Wayan Dipta Stadium, Gianyar

3 September 2015
16:00 UTC+8

Persija	1–1	Persita
Cahyo 7'		Lestaluhu 5'

Kapten I Wayan Dipta Stadium, Gianyar
3 September 2015
19:00 UTC+8

Mitra Kukar	2–2	Bali United
Zulkifli 73' (pen.); Airlangga 83'		Sausu 57'; Gatra 79'

Kapten I Wayan Dipta Stadium, Gianyar

7 September 2015
16:00 UTC+8

Mitra Kukar	0–0	Persija

Kapten I Wayan Dipta Stadium, Gianyar
7 September 2015
19:00 UTC+8

Bali United	2–1	Persita
Sukarja 26'; Eliandry 80' (pen.)		Rivaldi 59'

Kapten I Wayan Dipta Stadium, Gianyar

=== Group D ===
All games played in Andi Mattalata Stadium, Makassar, South Sulawesi.

Pos	Team	Pld	W	D	L	GF	GA	GD	Pts	Qualification
1	PSM (H)	3	2	1	0	5	0	+5	7	Knockout stage
2	Pusamania Borneo	3	2	1	0	5	1	+4	7	Knockout stage
3	Persipasi Bandung Raya	3	1	0	2	2	4	−2	3	
4	Gresik United	3	0	0	3	1	8	−7	0	

Source: RSSSF
(H) Hosts
31 August 2015
15:00 UTC+8

Persipasi Bandung Raya	0–2	Pusamania Borneo
		Puhiri 7'; Mulyana 52'

Andi Mattalatta Stadium, Makassar
31 August 2015
18:00 UTC+8

PSM	3–0	Gresik United
Chaeruddin 26' (pen.); Aditya 52'; Sinaga 68' (pen.)

Andi Mattalatta Stadium, Makassar

4 September 2015
15:00 UTC+8

Pusamania Borneo	3–1	Gresik United
Lopičić 9', 49'; Puhiri 28'		Ridwan 17'

Andi Mattalatta Stadium, Makassar
4 September 2015
18:00 UTC+8

PSM	2–0	Persipasi Bandung Raya
Ardan Aras 53'; Rasyid Bakri 83'

Andi Mattalatta Stadium, Makassar

8 September 2015
15:00 UTC+8

Persipasi Bandung Raya	2–0	Gresik United
Arianto 18'; Laly 84'

Andi Mattalatta Stadium, Makassar
8 September 2015
18:00 UTC+8

PSM	0–0	Pusamania Borneo

Andi Mattalatta Stadium, Makassar

== Knockout stage ==
=== Bracket ===
Quarter-finals
19/27 September
Arema Cronus	2	3	5
Bali United	1	2	3
20/27 September
Persebaya United	1	0	1
Sriwijaya	0	3	3
19/26 September
Mitra Kukar (a)	1	1	2
PSM	0	2	2
20/26 September
Pusamania Borneo	3	1	4
Persib (a)	2	2	4

Semi-finals
3/11 October
Arema Cronus	1	1	2
Sriwijaya	1	2	3
4/10 October
Mitra Kukar	1	1	2
Persib	0	3	3

Final
18 October – Jakarta
Sriwijaya	0
Persib	2
Third place
17 October – Gianyar
Arema Cronus	2
Mitra Kukar	0

=== Quarter-finals ===
Team 1	Agg.	Team 2	1st leg	2nd leg
Mitra Kukar	2–2 (a)	PSM	1–0	1–2
Arema Cronus	5–3	Bali United	2–1	3–2
Persebaya United	(w/o)	Sriwijaya	1–0	0–3 (awd.)
Pusamania Borneo	4–4 (a)	Persib	3–2	1–2

19 September 2015
16:00 UTC+8

Mitra Kukar	1–0	PSM
Carlos Sciucatti 9'

Aji Imbut Stadium, Tenggarong
26 September 2015
16:00 UTC+8

PSM	2–1	Mitra Kukar
Chaeruddin 80'; Prasetyo 90+2'		Rizky Pellu 3'

Andi Mattalatta Stadium, Makassar

2–2 on aggregate. Mitra Kukar won on away goals rule.

19 September 2015
18:00 UTC+7

Arema Cronus	2–1	Bali United
Siswanto 76'; Arif 87'		Eliandry 65' (pen.)

Kanjuruhan Stadium, Malang
27 September 2015
19:00 UTC+8

Bali United	2–3	Arema Cronus
Gatra 32'; Eliandry 42'		Cristian Gonzáles 36', 67', 73'

Kapten I Wayan Dipta Stadium, Gianyar

Arema Cronus won 5–3 on aggregate.

20 September 2015
15:00 UTC+7

Persebaya United	1–0	Sriwijaya
Nurcahyo 84'

Gelora Bung Tomo Stadium, Surabaya
27 September 2015
15:00 UTC+7

Sriwijaya	3–0 (w/o)	Persebaya United
		Armayn 5'

Gelora Sriwijaya Stadium, Palembang
Referee: Jerry Elly

Sriwijaya won 3–1 on aggregate. The second leg was abandoned and Sriwijaya won on walkover.

20 September 2015
19:00 UTC+8

Pusamania Borneo	3–2	Persib
Arpani 11'; Boaz 69', 73'		Spasojević 6'; Vujović 82'

Segiri Stadium, Samarinda
26 September 2015
18:00 UTC+7

Persib	2–1	Pusamania Borneo
Konaté 67'; Zulham 70'		Jajang 38'

Jalak Harupat Stadium, Bandung

4–4 on aggregate. Persib won on away goals rule.

=== Semi-finals ===
Team 1	Agg.	Team 2	1st leg	2nd leg
Arema Cronus	2–3	Sriwijaya	1–1	1–2
Mitra Kukar	2–3	Persib	1–0	1–3

3 October 2015
18:00 UTC+7

Arema Cronus	1–1	Sriwijaya
Gonzáles 58'		Wildansyah 71'

Kanjuruhan Stadium, Malang
11 October 2015
18:00 UTC+7

Sriwijaya	2–1	Arema Cronus
Akbar 44'; Musafri 79'		Lanciné Koné 73'

Manahan Stadium, Surakarta (Note: The match was moved from the original venue at Gelora Sriwijaya Stadium, Palembang due to the threat of smog.)

Sriwijaya FC won 3–2 on aggregate.

4 October 2015
19:00 UTC+8

Mitra Kukar	1–0	Persib
Sciucatti 83'

Aji Imbut Stadium, Tenggarong
10 October 2015
18:00 UTC+7

Persib	3–1	Mitra Kukar
Kughegbe 7' (o.g.); Atep 20'; Spasojević 26'		Sciucatti 8'

Jalak Harupat Stadium, Bandung

Persib won 3–2 on aggregate.

=== Third place final ===
Match played in Kapten I Wayan Dipta Stadium, Gianyar, Bali.

17 October 2015
18:00 UTC+7

Arema Cronus	2–0	Mitra Kukar
Gonzales 49'; Siswanto 85'

Kapten I Wayan Dipta Stadium, Gianyar
Attendance: 15,000
Referee: Oki Dwi Putra

=== Final ===
Match played in Gelora Bung Karno Stadium, Jakarta.

18 October 2015
18:00 UTC+7

Sriwijaya	0–2	Persib
		Jufriyanto 7'; Konate 45+1'

Gelora Bung Karno Main Stadium, Jakarta
Attendance: 75,000
Referee: Prasetyo Hadi

== Statistics ==
=== Goalscorers ===
There were 94 goals scored in 38 matches, for an average of 2.47 goals per match.

6 goals

- (Indonesia) Zulham Zamrun

5 goals

- (Indonesia) Cristian Gonzáles

4 goals

- (Indonesia) Lerby Eliandry
- (Ivory Coast) Lanciné Koné
- (Montenegro) Ilija Spasojević
- (Paraguay) Pedro Velázquez

3 goals

- (Argentina) Carlos Sciucatti
- (Indonesia) Bayu Pradana Andriatmo
- (Mali) Makan Konaté

2 goals

- (Indonesia) Bayu Gatra
- (Indonesia) Boaz Solossa
- (Indonesia) Hendro Siswanto
- (Indonesia) Jajang Mulyana
- (Indonesia) Patrich Wanggai
- (Indonesia) Samsul Arif
- (Indonesia) Syamsul Bachri Chaeruddin
- (Indonesia) Tantan
- (Indonesia) Terens Owang Puhiri
- (Indonesia) Wildansyah
- (Montenegro) Srđan Lopičić
- (Nigeria) Osas Saha

1 goal

- (Guinea) Mamadou Lamarana Diallo
- (Indonesia) Achmad Jufriyanto
- (Indonesia) Aditya Putra Dewa
- (Indonesia) Agung Prasetyo
- (Indonesia) Airlangga Sutjipto
- (Indonesia) Ardan Aras
- (Indonesia) Arpani
- (Indonesia) Asri Akbar
- (Indonesia) Atep
- (Indonesia) David Laly
- (Indonesia) Fadhil Sausu
- (Indonesia) Ferdinand Sinaga
- (Indonesia) Fitra Ridwan
- (Indonesia) Gunawan Dwi Cahyo
- (Indonesia) Henry Rivaldi
- (Indonesia) I Nyoman Sukarja
- (Indonesia) Ilham Udin Armaiyn
- (Indonesia) Isnan Ali
- (Indonesia) Johan Ahmad Farizi
- (Indonesia) Mochammad Solehudin
- (Indonesia) Muhammad Agus Salim
- (Indonesia) Nova Arianto
- (Indonesia) Rafid Lestaluhu
- (Indonesia) Rasyid Bakri
- (Indonesia) Rizky Pellu
- (Indonesia) Sandi Darma Sutha
- (Indonesia) Slamet Nurcahyo
- (Indonesia) Sultan Samma
- (Indonesia) Syaifullah Nazar
- (Indonesia) Syakir Sulaiman
- (Indonesia) Talaohu Abdul Musafri
- (Indonesia) Zulkifli Syukur
- (Montenegro) Vladimir Vujović

1 own goal

- (Nigeria) Onorionde Kughegbe (against Persib)

=== Awards ===
- Best Player: Zulham Zamrun (Persib Bandung)
- Top Scorer: Zulham Zamrun (Persib Bandung)
- Fair Play Team: Sriwijaya

=== Tournament team rankings ===
As per statistical convention in football, matches decided in extra time were counted as wins and losses, while matches decided by penalty shoot-outs were counted as draws.

Pos	Grp	Team	Pld	W	D	L	GF	GA	GD	Pts	Final result
1	A	Persib	8	6	0	2	19	6	+13	18	Champions
2	B	Sriwijaya	8	4	1	3	10	8	+2	13	Runners-up
3	B	Arema Cronus	8	4	3	1	14	9	+5	15	Third place
4	C	Mitra Kukar	8	2	3	3	6	9	−3	9	Fourth place
5	D	PSM	5	3	1	1	7	2	+5	10	Eliminated in quarter-finals
6	D	Pusamania Borneo	5	3	1	1	9	5	+4	10	Eliminated in quarter-finals
7	C	Bali United	5	2	1	2	10	8	+2	7	Eliminated in quarter-finals
8	A	Persebaya United	5	2	1	2	5	6	−1	7	Eliminated in quarter-finals
9	D	Persipasi Bandung Raya	3	1	0	2	2	4	−2	3	Eliminated in group stage
10	A	Persiba	3	1	0	2	4	10	−6	3	Eliminated in group stage
11	C	Persita	3	0	2	1	2	3	−1	2	Eliminated in group stage
12	B	PSGC	3	0	2	1	2	3	−1	2	Eliminated in group stage
13	B	Persela	3	0	2	1	2	4	−2	2	Eliminated in group stage
14	C	Persija	3	0	2	1	1	4	−3	2	Eliminated in group stage
15	A	Martapura	3	0	1	2	2	7	−5	1	Eliminated in group stage
16	D	Gresik United	3	0	0	3	1	8	−7	0	Eliminated in group stage

Source: Group stage, Knockout stage
