= 2010 Indonesian Inter Island Cup =

Indonesian football tournament

2010 Inter Island Cup
Tournament details
- Host country: Indonesia
- Dates: 27 August – 5 September 2010
- Teams: 6
- Venues: 2 (in 2 host cities)

Final positions
- Champions: Sriwijaya FC (1st title)
- Runners-up: Persiwa Wamena

Tournament statistics
- Matches played: 7
- Goals scored: 25 (3.57 per match)
- Attendance: 55,450 (7,921 per match)

Football clubs representing the five main islands of the Indonesian archipelago contested the 2010–2011 season of the Indonesian Super League at the Djarum Inter Islands Cup football tournament.

The six clubs participating in the tournament held between 27 August – 5 September by PT Liga Indonesia were divided into two groups.

Teams in Group A – consisting of Sumatra's Sriwijaya FC, Kalimantan's Balikpapan FC, Persib Bandung (Java) – competed at Jakabaring Stadium in Palembang, South Sumatra, while, Group B's PSM (Sulawesi), Arema FC Indonesia (Java), and Persiwa Wamena (Papua) competed in Malang, East Java.

The final of the tournament took place in Palembang on 5 September, when Sriwijaya FC won by 2–0 over Persiwa Wamena.

== Group stage ==
Winners of each group will qualify for the final.

=== Group A ===
- All matches were played in Malang Regency on 27 – 31 August 2010.
- Times listed are UTC+7.

Team	Pld	W	D	L	GF	GA	GD	Pts
Persiwa	2	1	1	0	5	3	+2	4
PS Arema	2	1	1	0	2	1	+1	4
PSM	2	0	0	2	2	5	−3	0

27 August 2010
21.15 WIB

PSM	0–1	PS Arema
	Report	Musyafri 78'

Kanjuruhan Stadium, Malang, Indonesia
Referee: Oki Dwi Putra
29 August 2010
21.15 WIB

Persiwa	4–2	PSM
Edison Pieter Romaropen 6'; Ferdinand Sinaga 54'; Imanuel Permenas Padwa 58'; Li Haoyuan 85'	Report	Andi Oddang Mustamu 17'; Satrio Syam 71'

Kanjuruhan Stadium, Malang, Indonesia
Referee: Jerry Elly
31 August 2010
21.15 WIB

Arema	1–1	Persiwa
Mochammad Fahkrudin 50' (pen.)	Report	Alan Aronggear 63'

Kanjuruhan Stadium, Malang, Indonesia
Referee: Aeng Suarlan

=== Group B ===
- All matches were played in Palembang City on 27 August – 1 September 2010.
- Times listed are UTC+7.

Team	Pld	W	D	L	GF	GA	GD	Pts
Sriwijaya	2	1	0	1	6	3	+3	3
Persiba	2	1	0	1	5	3	+2	3
Persib	2	1	0	1	3	8	−5	3

28 August 2010
21.15 WIB

Sriwijaya FC	0–3	Persiba
	Report	Sultan Samma 5', 38'; Eka Santika 76'

Jakabaring Stadium, Palembang, Indonesia
Referee: Mardi
30 August 2010
21.15 WIB

Persiba	2–3	Persib
Asri Akbar 50'; Yudi Khoerudin 69' (o.g.)	Report	Mijo Dadić 52' (o.g.); Christian Gérard Alvaro González 58'; Rachmat Affandi 79'

Jakabaring Stadium, Palembang, Indonesia
Referee: Jimmy Napitupulu
1 September 2010
21.15 WIB

Persib	0–6	Sriwijaya FC
	Report	Budi Sudarsono 12', 13', 23'; Park Jung-hwan 25'; Oktovianus Maniani 58', 71'

Jakabaring Stadium, Palembang, Indonesia
Referee: M Olehadi

== Final ==
5 September 2010
21.15 WIB

Persiwa	0–2	Sriwijaya FC
	Report	Park Jung-hwan 20'; Budi Sudarsono 63'

Jakabaring Stadium, Palembang, Indonesia
Referee: Oki Dwi Putra

== Goalscorers ==
4 goals

- Budi Sudarsono (Indonesia) Sriwijaya FC

2 goals

- Oktovianus Maniani (Indonesia) Sriwijaya FC
- Sultan Samma (Indonesia) Balikpapan FC
- Park Jung-hwan (KOR) Sriwijaya FC

1 goal

- Edison Pieter Romaropen (Indonesia) Wamena FC
- Imanuel Permenas Padwa (Indonesia) Wamena FC
- Alan Aronggear (Indonesia) Wamena FC
- Talaohu Abdul Musyafri (Indonesia) Arema FC
- Eka Santika (Indonesia) Balikpapan FC
- Satrio Syam (Indonesia) Makassar FC
- Rachmat Affandi (Indonesia) Bandung FC
- Ferdinand Alfred Sinaga (Indonesia) Wamena FC
- Li Haoyuan (China) Wamena FC
- Mochammad Fahkrudin (Indonesia) Arema FC
- Asri Akbar (Indonesia) Balikpapan FC
- Andi Oddang Mustamu (Indonesia) Makassar FC
- Christian Gérard Alvaro González (Uruguay) Bandung FC

Own goals

- Mijo Dadic (Croatia) Balikpapan FC (playing against Bandung FC)
- Yudi Khoerudin (Indonesia) Bandung FC (playing against Balikpapan FC)
