= List of Indonesian football transfers 2010–11 =

This is a list of Indonesian football transfers for the sale in 2010–11 season. Only moves from Indonesia Super League and Liga Indonesia Premier Division are listed.

== The 2010-11 transfer window ==
Date	Name	Moving from	Moving to	Fee
5-09-2010	(Morocco) Redouane Barkaoui	(Indonesia) Pelita Jaya	(Indonesia) Persela Lamongan	
30-08-2010	(Indonesia) Leonard Tupamahu	(Indonesia) Persija Jakarta	Arema Indonesia	
25-08-2010	(Indonesia) Ahmad Amiruddin	(Indonesia) Persiram Raja Ampat	Arema Indonesia	
23-08-2010	(Indonesia) Achmad Kurniawan	(Indonesia) Semen Padang	Arema Indonesia	
15-08-2010	(Indonesia) Muhammad Jaenal Ichwan	(Indonesia) Persema Malang	(Indonesia) Persela Lamongan	
09-08-2010	(Indonesia) Irfan Bachdim	Free agent	(Indonesia) Persema Malang	Free
07-08-2010	(Indonesia) Eka Santika	(Indonesia) Pro Titan FC	(Indonesia) Persiba Balikpapan	
