= Arsyad =

Arsyad is an Indonesian name. Notable people with the name include:

- Arsyad Thawil al-Bantani (1851–1934), Indonesian hero
- Arsyad Yusgiantoro (born 1996), Indonesian footballer
- Muhammad Arsyad (born 1993), Indonesian footballer
