= Mamadou Lamarana Diallo =

Mamadou Lamarana Diallo may refer to:

- Mamadou Lamarana Diallo (born 1985), Guinean footballer for Persatu Tuban
- Mamadou Lamarana Diallo (born 1994), Senegalese footballer for Grenoble
