= Gultom =

Batak surname originating in Indonesia

Gultom is one of Toba Batak clans originating in North Sumatra, Indonesia. People of this clan bear the clan's name as their surname.

- Dolly Gultom (born 1993), Indonesian professional footballer
- Ivan Doly Gultom, (born 1967), Indonesian politician
- Martha Gultom (born 1939), Indonesian female swimmer
- Sahari Gultom (born 1977), Indonesian professional footballer
- Vandiko Gultom (born 1992), Indonesian politician
