= Wawan Febrianto =

Indonesian footballer

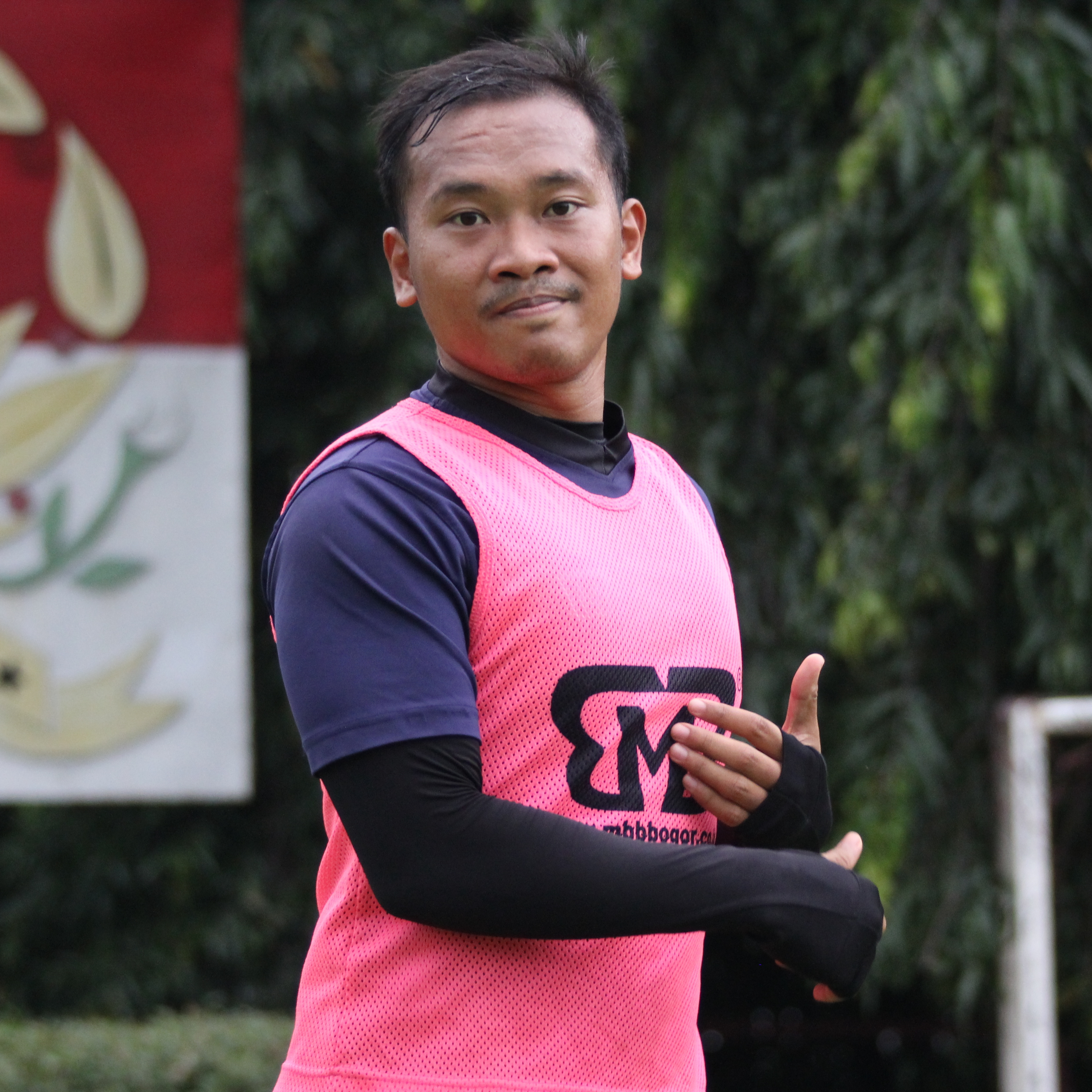
- Wawan with TIRA–Persikabo in 2019

Personal information
- Full name: Wawan Febrianto
- Date of birth: 23 February 1994 (age 32)
- Place of birth: Pati, Indonesia
- Height: 1.67 m (5 ft 6 in)
- Position: Winger

Team information
- Current team: Persika Karanganyar

Youth career
- 2011–2012: Deportivo Indonesia
- 2013: Pelita Bandung Raya

Senior career*
Years	Team	Apps	(Gls)
2014–2015	Pelita Bandung Raya	22	(2)
2015–2021	TIRA–Persikabo	90	(16)
2021–2022	Borneo Samarinda	27	(7)
2022–2023	PSIS Semarang	34	(3)
2023–2024	Malut United	15	(3)
2024–2025	Persela Lamongan	26	(0)
2026	PSIS Semarang	13	(0)
2026–	Persika Karanganyar	0	(0)

International career
2011	Indonesia U19	4	(0)
2014–2015	Indonesia U23	11	(2)
2019	Indonesia	1	(0)
- * Club domestic league appearances and goals as of 3 May 2026

Wawan Febrianto (born 23 February 1994) is an Indonesian professional footballer who plays as a winger for Liga Nusantara club Persika Karanganyar. He is also a Second Sergeant in the Indonesian Army.

== Club career ==
=== Youth ===
He was part of Deportivo Indonesia and Pelita Bandung Raya U21.

=== Pelita Bandung Raya ===
He was promoted from the youth team to the senior squad for the 2014 Indonesia Super League season. He scored his first professional goal in a 4–1 win against Gresik United on 26 May 2014, scoring the fourth goal in injury time.

=== PSIS Semarang ===
PSIS Semarang management officially recruited Wawan Febrianto from Borneo Samarinda with a transfer system. This is because the player in question still has a one-season contract with the club nicknamed Pesut Etam.

== International career ==
He made his debut for the Indonesia in the 2022 FIFA World Cup qualification against Vietnam on 15 October 2019.

== Career statistics ==
=== Club ===
As of 3 May 2026

Appearances and goals by club, season and competition
Club	Season	League			National Cup (Note: Includes Piala Indonesia)		Continental		Other (Note: Appearances in Indonesia President's Cup)		Total	
Club	Season	Division	Apps	Goals	Apps	Goals	Apps	Goals	Apps	Goals	Apps	Goals
Pelita Bandung Raya	2014	Indonesia Super League	20	2	0	0	–		0	0	20	2
Pelita Bandung Raya	2015	Indonesia Super League	2	0	0	0	–		0	0	2	0
Pelita Bandung Raya	Total		22	2	0	0	0	0	0	0	22	2
PS TNI	2016	ISC A	11	2	0	0	–		0	0	11	2
PS TNI	2017	Liga 1	26	2	0	0	–		0	0	26	2
PS TIRA	2018	Liga 1	26	4	0	0	–		0	0	26	4
TIRA–Persikabo	2019	Liga 1	27	8	1	0	–		3	0	31	8
TIRA–Persikabo	2020	Liga 1	0	0	0	0	–		3 (Note: Appearances in Menpora Cup)	0	3	0
TIRA–Persikabo	Total		90	16	1	0	0	0	6	0	97	16
Borneo Samarinda	2021–22	Liga 1	27	7	0	0	–		0	0	27	7
PSIS Semarang	2022–23	Liga 1	28	3	0	0	–		7	1	35	4
PSIS Semarang	2023–24	Liga 1	6	0	0	0	–		0	0	6	0
Malut United	2023–24	Liga 2	15	3	0	0	–		0	0	15	3
Persela Lamongan	2024–25	Liga 2	16	0	0	0	–		0	0	16	0
Persela Lamongan	2025–26	Championship	10	0	0	0	–		0	0	10	0
PSIS Semarang	2025–26	Championship	13	0	0	0	–		0	0	13	0
Career total			227	31	1	0	0	0	13	1	241	32

=== International ===
As of 15 October 2019

Appearances and goals by national team and year
National team	Year	Apps	Goals
Indonesia	2019	1	0
Total		1	0

==== International goals ====
Scores and results list the Indonesia's goal tally first.

Indonesia U-23

#	Date	Venue	Opponent	Score	Result	Competition
1.	21 May 2015	Si Jalak Harupat Stadium, Bandung, Indonesia	Malaysia U-23	1–0	1–0	Friendly
2.	6 June 2015	Jalan Besar Stadium, Kallang, Singapore	Cambodia U-23	5–1	6–1	2015 SEA Games

== Honours ==
Malut United

- Liga 2 third place (play-offs): 2023–24
