= Santika =

Santika may refer to:

- Santika Club fire, a 2009 nightclub fire in Bangkok, Thailand
- Santika Indonesia Hotels & Resorts, an Indonesian hotel chain
- Eka Santika (born 1982), Indonesian footballer
