= Zulham Zamrun =

Indonesian footballer

Personal information
- Full name: Zulham Malik Zamrun
- Date of birth: 19 February 1988 (age 38)
- Place of birth: Ternate, Indonesia
- Height: 1.72 m (5 ft 8 in)
- Position: Winger

Youth career
- 2005: Persiter Ternate

Senior career*
| Years | Team | Apps | (Gls) |
| 2006−2007 | Persiter Ternate | 18 | (8) |
| 2008−2009 | Persigo Gorontalo | 29 | (6) |
| 2009−2010 | Pro Duta | 18 | (3) |
| 2010−2011 | Persela Lamongan | 23 | (6) |
| 2011−2014 | Mitra Kukar | 79 | (24) |
| 2015 | Persipura Jayapura | 2 | (2) |
| 2015−2016 | Persib Bandung | 29 | (10) |
| 2017 | Mitra Kukar | 5 | (0) |
| 2017–2020 | PSM Makassar | 54 | (13) |
| 2020–2021 | Persib Bandung | 1 | (0) |
| 2021 | PSM Makassar | 0 | (0) |
| 2021 | PSG Pati | 8 | (1) |
| 2022–2024 | Persela Lamongan | 23 | (9) |
| 2025 | Persijap Jepara | 5 | (0) |

International career
| 2011 | Indonesia U23 | 2 | (0) |
| 2011−2016 | Indonesia | 31 | (7) |
Medal record
Men's football
Representing Indonesia
AFF Championship
| Runner-up | 2016 Myanmar & Philippines | Team |
- * Club domestic league appearances and goals as of 18 February 2025

Zulham Malik Zamrun (born 19 February 1988) is an Indonesian footballer who plays as a winger.

== Personal life ==
Zulham Zamrun was born in Ternate, North Maluku, the son to Malik Zamrun a scout of Persiter Ternate. He has a twin brother Zulvin Zamrun who is also a professional footballer.

== International career ==
He made his debut in the Indonesia national team in a friendly match against Saudi Arabia on 7 October 2011, where he appeared as a substitute.

== Career statistics ==
=== International ===
As of match played 17 December 2016

Appearances and goals by national team and year
| National team | Year | Apps | Goals |
|---|---|---|---|
| Indonesia | 2011 | 1 | 0 |
| Indonesia | 2012 | 0 | 0 |
| Indonesia | 2013 | 3 | 2 |
| Indonesia | 2014 | 14 | 4 |
| Indonesia | 2015 | 2 | 0 |
| Indonesia | 2016 | 11 | 1 |
| Total | | 31 | 7 |

=== International goals ===
Zulham Zamrun: International goals
| No. | Date | Venue | Opponent | Score | Result | Competition |
|---|---|---|---|---|---|---|
| 1 | 1 November 2013 | Gelora Bung Karno Stadium, Jakarta, Indonesia | Kyrgyzstan | 1–0 | 4–0 | Friendly |
| 2 | 1 November 2013 | Gelora Bung Karno Stadium, Jakarta, Indonesia | Kyrgyzstan | 2–0 | 4–0 | Friendly |
| 3 | 21 June 2014 | Gelora Delta Stadium, Sidoarjo, Indonesia | Pakistan | 3–0 | 4–0 | Friendly |
| 4 | 11 November 2014 | Gelora Bung Karno Stadium, Jakarta, Indonesia | Timor-Leste | 2–0 | 4–0 | Friendly |
| 5 | 22 November 2014 | Mỹ Đình National Stadium, Hanoi, Vietnam | Vietnam | 1–1 | 2–2 | 2014 AFF Suzuki Cup |
| 6 | 28 November 2014 | Hàng Đẫy Stadium, Hanoi, Vietnam | Laos | 4–1 | 5–1 | 2014 AFF Suzuki Cup |
| 7 | 9 October 2016 | Maguwoharjo Stadium, Sleman, Indonesia | Vietnam | 1–2 | 2–2 | Friendly |

== Honours ==
=== Club ===
Persib Bandung

- Indonesia President's Cup: 2015

PSM Makassar

- Piala Indonesia: 2018–19

Persijap Jepara

- Liga 2 Promotion play-offs: 2024–25

=== International ===
Indonesia

- AFF Championship runner-up: 2016

=== Individual ===
- Indonesia President's Cup Best Player: 2015
- Indonesia President's Cup Top Goalscorer: 2015
- Piala Indonesia Best Player: 2018–19
- Piala Indonesia Top Goalscorer: 2018–19 (shared)
