= Park Jung-hwan (footballer) =

South Korean footballer (born 1977)

Personal information
- Full name: Park Jung-hwan
- Date of birth: 14 January 1977 (age 49)
- Place of birth: Seoul, South Korea
- Height: 1.80 m (5 ft 11 in)
- Position: Striker

Senior career*
Years	Team	Apps	(Gls)
1999–2005	Anyang LG Cheetahs / FC Seoul	40	(15)
2004–2005	→ Gwangu Sangmu (military service)	25	(6)
2006–2007	Jeonbuk Hyundai Motors	10	(2)
2007–2008	Yiteng	18	(7)
2008–2009	Suwon City FC	28	(8)
2009–2010	Persiba Balikpapan	14	(3)
2010–2011	PSM Makassar	15	(6)
2011–2012	Sriwijaya	14	(2)
2012–2013	Ansan H FC	16	(3)
Total		180	(52)
- * Club domestic league appearances and goals

Park Jung-hwan (born 14 January 1977) is a former South Korean footballer.

== Club career ==
=== Korean club career ===
Park Jung-hwan debuted in FC Seoul then known as Anyang LG Cheetahs and spent his mandatory two years military service spell with Gwangju Sangmu, from 2004 to 2005. After a spell abroad in China with Yiteng Football Club, he returned to the National League in the summer of 2007 to sign for Suwon City.

=== Persiba ===
He made his first appearance for the club on 5 November, coming on as substitute for Fery Ariawan against Bontang FC.

Park's first goal for Persiba came in a Round 8 of Indonesian Super League game against Persija on the 21 November 2009.

=== PSM ===
When the February transfer window opened, Park joined PSM on a six-month loan.

=== Sriwijaya FC ===
Sriwijaya was the third club he played for, one year after he arrived in Indonesia. On 11 August, the Sumatera Ekspres reported that Jung-Hwan had agreed to join Sriwijaya.

Park was given the number 88 shirt.

== Honours ==
Sriwijaya

- Indonesian Community Shield: 2010
- Indonesian Inter Island Cup: 2010
