= Irfan Bachdim =

Indonesian footballer

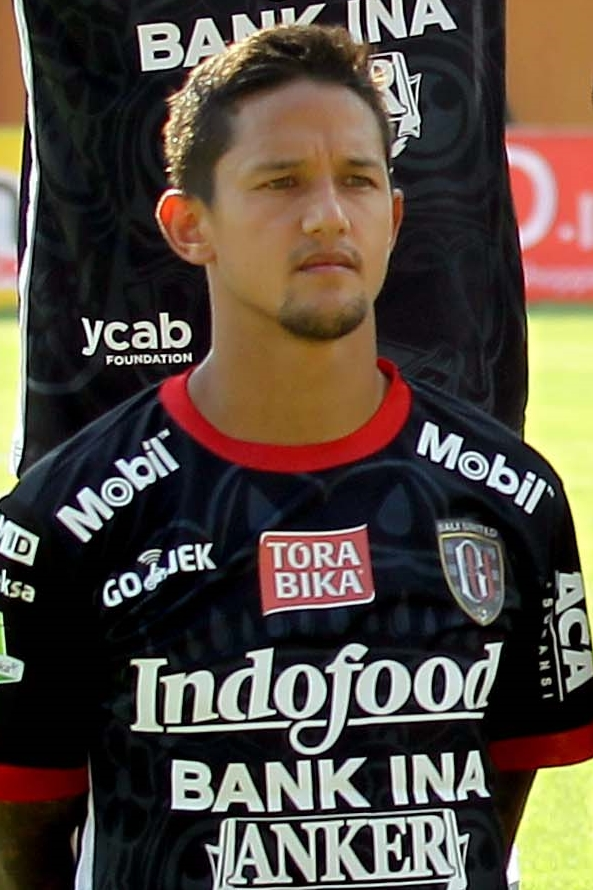
- Bachdim playing for Bali United in 2017

Personal information
- Full name: Irfan Haarys Bachdim
- Date of birth: 11 August 1988 (age 38)
- Place of birth: Amsterdam, Netherlands
- Height: 5 ft 8 in (1.72 m)
- Positions: Winger; attacking midfielder

Youth career
- 1997–1998: Argon
- 1998–2000: Ajax
- 2000–2003: Argon
- 2003–2007: Utrecht

Senior career*
Years	Team	Apps	(Gls)
2007–2009	Utrecht	1	(0)
2009–2010	Haarlem	19	(2)
2010	Argon	4	(0)
2010–2012	Persema Malang	25	(16)
2013	Chonburi	8	(1)
2013	→ Sriracha (loan)	11	(3)
2014	Ventforet Kofu	0	(0)
2015–2016	Consadole Sapporo	7	(0)
2017–2019	Bali United	66	(13)
2020–2021	PSS Sleman	7	(1)
2021–2023	Persis Solo	26	(4)
2023–2024	Persik Kediri	11	(0)
Total		178	(39)

International career
2010–2019	Indonesia	42	(13)
Medal record
Men's football
Representing Indonesia
AFF Championship
Runner-up	2010 Indonesia & Vietnam	Team
- * Club domestic league appearances and goals as of 28 April 2024

Irfan Haarys Bachdim (born 11 August 1988) is a former footballer who plays as a winger or attacking midfielder. Born in the Netherlands, he represented the Indonesia national team.

== Early life ==
Irfan's father, Noval, is an Indonesian national of Arab descent born in Malang, East Java. He lived in the resort area of Lawang outside Malang before moving to the Netherlands in the 1980s, where he resettled and married Hester van Dijk, a Dutch national. Irfan was born a Muslim in Amsterdam as the couple's second son and lived there until adulthood. As he has maintained his Indonesian nationality throughout his life, he is not considered naturalised.

Irfan was born to a family of footballers. Noval formerly played for PS Fajar Lawang (an association member of Persekam Malang) in the 1980s. Additionally, Irfan's grandfather, Ali, played for Persema Malang in his hometown and PSAD Jakarta, a military team, as he also served in the Indonesian Navy.

== Club career ==
=== Early career ===
Irfan Bachdim started his football career at SV Argon in 1997 and moved in 1998 to the famed Ajax Youth Academy in Amsterdam, where he trained along with Mitchell Donald, Jeffrey Sarpong, Christian Supusepa and Ryan Babel. After three years there, he returned to SV Argon, where he became the youth league's top scorer despite his midfield position.

=== FC Utrecht ===
Scouts of FC Utrecht, a club that has never been absent from the top flight of Dutch football, recruited him in 2003. He started for FC Utrecht's junior team, all the while appearing on occasions for the senior reserve team. He made his debut for FC Utrecht in the Dutch top-tier league, the Eredivisie, on 17 February 2008, playing 90 minutes against VVV-Venlo.

Bachdim joined the Indonesia national under-23 football team during a training camp that took place in the Netherlands. However, his debut in Indonesia's red and white colours had to be delayed because he was injured one week prior to the 2006 Asian Games.

=== HFC Haarlem ===
After FC Utrecht chose not to extend his contract, Bachdim signed for HFC Haarlem in July 2009 in a free transfer deal. In March 2010, he underwent trials in Indonesia for Persib Bandung and Persija Jakarta. However, neither club signed him.

=== Persema Malang ===
Bachdim's desire to play in Indonesia was finally realised on 9 August 2010, upon his recruitment by the then-coach of Persema Malang, Timo Scheunemann, after the latter observed the former and other young footballers in a charity match for football figure Lucky Acub Zaenal at the Gajayana Stadium in Malang, the birthplace of Bachdim's father. Bachdim was recruited along with Kim Jeffrey Kurniawan, a footballer of Indonesian-German descent who previously played for FC Heidelsheim in Germany. Bachdim, who had been a holder of Indonesian passport since his childhood, was recognized and recruited as an Indonesian-born, not a naturalized player. At Persema, Bachdim played more at the front as second striker or winger.

After Persema's decision to move from the Indonesian Super League (ISL) to the Indonesian Premier League (IPL) during the 2011 schism in Indonesian football management, Bachdim considered leaving Persema due to the threat of not being able to play for the national team. The football federation, PSSI, considered the new competition as a renegade league. However, he ended up committing himself to Persema by signing a three-year contract, despite continuous intimidation from PSSI to leave the club and valuable contracts offered by several ISL clubs. Eventually, Youth and Sports Minister Andi Mallarangeng guaranteed Bachdim's right to perform for the national team. He was called by the U-23 team to play at the 2011 Southeast Asian Games and the qualifications for the 2012 Olympics.

=== Chonburi FC ===
As the league dualism in Indonesia continued to undermine the smooth running of competitions, Bachdim participated in trials outside Indonesia. He tried his luck at leading Thailand club BEC Tero Sasana, where he was able to give an average performance but failed to be selected. His efforts succeeded in 2013 when he was signed by another Thailand club Chonburi on a two-year contract.

In early December 2013 after failing to get a regular spot, Bachdim went for trials at J-League clubs Vegalta Sendai and Ventforet Kofu. He said that if he did not get a contract with any of these clubs, he would go back to Chonburi to prove himself to the new manager. Ventforet Kofu recruited him after a few weeks.

=== Ventforet Kofu ===
Bachdim announced on Monday, 27 January 2014 that he had officially joined J. League first-division side Ventforet Kofu. According to Ventforet, the club thought highly of the forward's potential during a tryout held by the J. League Players Association. His fast playing style as a winger caught the club's eye even though he was not in top physical condition at the time.

Ventforet general manager Satoru Sakuma said Bachdim will be the J. League's first Indonesian player and his contract will run through the end of the 2014 season. However, he failed to win playing time.

=== Hokkaido Consadole Sapporo ===
Japanese media on Monday, 22 December 2014 published that J2 league team Hokkaido Consadole Sapporo had signed Bachdim from Ventforet Kofu despite the Indonesian international's lack of playtime. Bachdim was one of six new players whom the club presented on 20 January 2015. On 3 May 2015, Bachdim made his first J2 appearance in Consadole Sapporo's 3–0 win over Jubilo Iwata. After replacing Brazilian teammate Nildo on the right flank, Bachdim drew cheers from the crowd when he streaked up the sideline and sent a well-placed cross in his first play.

=== Bali United ===
After injuries upset his football experience in Japan, Bachdim in 2017 returned to Indonesia to play for the up-and-coming Bali United F.C., which has developed a strong fanbase since the club began to play in Bali island's Gianyar Regency in 2015. It was in Bali where Bachdim found his professional and personal comfort zone. He was the favorite of the fans who often see him ride a scooter to the training pitch from his private residence. He played 66 times for the club and impressed with his goals and trademark sideline dribbles under loud chants from the fans who had their own song for the player who they called the prince. Bachdim helped give the tourist island of Bali its first national football title when Bali United won the 2019 Liga 1 competition.

Unfortunately, his injuries often recurred in Bali, forcing him to slide down the pecking order and give way for fitter players throughout the years. In early 2020, Bali United made it clear that his service would not be retained. His fans gave a heartfelt send-off after his last session as a Bali United player. On 14 February 2020, Bachdim was officially introduced at less glamorous Liga 1 club PSS Sleman, which is also known for its ultras who have propelled a revolution in the club. Sleman fans, however, were unimpressed when Bachdim expressed his love for Bali and Bali United during the transition.

=== PSS Sleman ===
Before Bachdim could endear himself to the supporters of his new club, the 2020 Liga 1 competition stopped only after three games due to the COVID-19 pandemic that led to restrictions against professional football matches for one full year. He renewed his contract in 2021 after PSS signed his brother-in-law and former Persema teammate Kim Kurniawan, pledging he would fulfil his mission to boost PSS move forward.

=== Persis Solo ===
In 2021, Bachdim joined Liga 2 club Persis Solo After resigning from Liga 1 club PSS Sleman. He made his league debut on 15 November 2021 in a match against PSIM Yogyakarta at the Manahan Stadium, Surakarta. On 30 December 2021, Bachdim scored his first goal for Persis against RANS Cilegon in the 40th minute at the Pakansari Stadium, Cibinong.

== International career ==
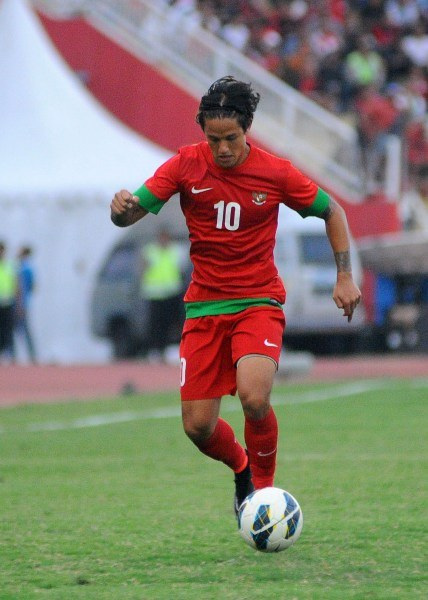
Bachdim playing for Indonesia in 2014

Irfan Bachdim on 1 December 2010 debuted for the Indonesian national team at the 2010 AFF Championship and helped the squad reach the final match. His two goals in the competition propelled him into football stardom in Indonesia. From this point, he became a regular choice for the national team until late 2019 under different coaches. He was called up for the February 2020 national team training under new coach Shin Tae-yong.

== Personal life ==
Bachdim is a celebrity in Indonesia. He is well known for starring in many product advertisements including Pocari Sweat, Suzuki, Nike, and many more. He is one of the very select few Indonesian footballers who have appeared in other scopes outside of football. He is massively popular domestically among female fans due to his looks and personality.

Bachdim is married to Jennifer Kurniawan, a model born to a Chinese Indonesian father and a German mother. She is also the older sister of footballer Kim Kurniawan, who joined Bachdim at PSS on 28 February 2021. The couple met when the two Europe-trained footballers explored opportunities to play in Indonesia in 2010. On 8 July 2011, Bachdim and Kurniawan tied the knot in Germany. On 5 February 2012, Bachdim's first child and daughter, Kiyomi Sue Bachdim, was born. Two years later, on 21 March 2014, Bachdim's second child and first son, Kenji Zizou Bachdim, was born. Their third, Kiyoji Bachdim, was born on 1 March 2021, a few days before Bachdim renewed his contract with PSS. The Bachdims reside in Bali, where they also run a clothing line.

== Career statistics ==
=== International ===
As of match played 19 November 2019

Appearances and goals by national team and year
National team	Year	Apps	Goals
Indonesia	2010	8	2
Indonesia	2011	4	0
Indonesia	2012	13	5
Indonesia	2013	2	0
Indonesia	2014	3	1
Indonesia	2016	3	3
Indonesia	2017	4	1
Indonesia	2019	5	1
Total		42	13

As of match played 19 November 2019
Scores and results list Indonesia's goal tally first, score column indicates score after each Bachdim goal.

List of international goals scored by Irfan Bachdim
No.	Date	Venue	Cap	Opponent	Score	Result	Competition
1	1 December 2010	Gelora Bung Karno Stadium, Jakarta, Indonesia	3	Malaysia	5–1	5–1	2010 AFF Championship
2	4 December 2010	Gelora Bung Karno Stadium, Jakarta, Indonesia	4	Laos	4–0	6–0	2010 AFF Championship
3	22 May 2012	Hussein Bin Ali Stadium, Hebron, Palestine	15	Palestine	1–0	1–2	Friendly
4	5 June 2012	Rizal Memorial Stadium, Manila, Philippines	16	Philippines	2–1	2–2	Friendly
5	26 September 2012	Sultan Hassanal Bolkiah Stadium, Bandar Seri Begawan, Brunei	19	Brunei	1–0	5–0	Friendly
6	26 September 2012	Sultan Hassanal Bolkiah Stadium, Bandar Seri Begawan, Brunei	19	Brunei	3–0	5–0	Friendly
7	26 September 2012	Sultan Hassanal Bolkiah Stadium, Bandar Seri Begawan, Brunei	19	Brunei	5–0	5–0	Friendly
8	14 July 2014	Saoud bin Abdulrahman Stadium, Al Wakrah, Qatar	28	Qatar	2–2	2–2	Friendly
9	6 September 2016	Manahan Stadium, Surakarta, Indonesia	31	Malaysia	2–0	3–0	Friendly
10	9 October 2016	Maguwoharjo Stadium, Sleman, Indonesia	32	Vietnam	2–2	2–2	Friendly
11	8 November 2016	Mỹ Đình National Stadium, Hanoi, Vietnam	33	Vietnam	2–1	2–3	Friendly
12	8 June 2017	Phnom Penh Olympic Stadium, Phnom Penh, Cambodia	34	Cambodia	1–0	2–0	Friendly
13	15 October 2019	Kapten I Wayan Dipta Stadium, Gianyar, Indonesia	42	Vietnam	1–3	1–3	2022 FIFA World Cup qualification

== Honours ==
Consadole Sapporo

- J2 League: 2016

Bali United

- Liga 1: 2019
- Indonesia President's Cup runner-up: 2018

PSS Sleman

- Menpora Cup third place: 2021

Persis Solo

- Liga 2: 2021

Indonesia

- AFF Championship runner-up: 2010

Individual

- Thai League Dream ASEAN XI
- Liga 1 Best XI: 2017

== See also ==
- List of Indonesia international footballers born outside Indonesia
