= Saddam Hi Tenang =

Indonesian footballer (born 1994)

Personal information
- Full name: Saddam Hi Tenang
- Date of birth: 2 February 1994 (age 32)
- Place of birth: Ternate, Indonesia
- Height: 1.69 m (5 ft 7 in)
- Position: Left-back

Youth career
- 2010: Aceh United
- 2011: Persebaya

Senior career*
Years	Team	Apps	(Gls)
2011–2013	Persebaya	0	(0)
2012–2013	→ Arema Indonesia (loan)	20	(0)
2014–2017	Pelita Bandung Raya	12	(0)
2017	Persijap Jepara	4	(0)
2018	Persiraja Banda Aceh	24	(0)
2019–2020	Babel United	17	(0)
2021–2023	RANS Nusantara	35	(0)
2022	→ Barito Putera (loan)	10	(0)
2023–2025	Malut United	14	(0)
2025–2026	PSMS Medan	13	(0)
- * Club domestic league appearances and goals as of 28 February 2026

Saddam Hi Tenang, sometimes written as Saddam Tenang (born 2 February 1994) is an Indonesian professional footballer who plays as a left-back. Previously, he played for several Indonesian first-tier league clubs.

== Club career ==
=== Youth ===
He began his youth football career at Aceh United, before joining Persebaya in 2011, also for the youth team.

=== Arema Indonesia ===
In February 2012, he was loaned out to Arema Indonesia (later Arema F.C.) and established himself as regular during 2011-12 Indonesian Premier League, and played in several big matches, such as when Arema Indonesia played Bontang F.C. and Malang Derby versus Persema Malang. During a Piala Indonesia game, when Arema played PSM Makasar, he received a red card.

=== Pelita Bandung Raya ===
In 2014, he signed for Pelita Bandung Raya (later the club changed its name to Madura United) to play in Indonesian Super League. He helped Pelita Bandung Raya reach the semifinal of 2014 Indonesia Super League. However, in the next season, he had a hard time, due to his injury and high competition.

=== Persijap Jepara ===
He moved to Persijap Jepara in 2017 and played his first game in the second half of the season after his injury recovery.

=== Persiraja Banda Aceh ===
In 2018, he signed for Persiraja Banda Aceh to play in Liga 2.

=== Muba Babel United ===
In 2019, Saddam signed a one-year contract with Indonesian Liga 2 club Muba Babel United.

== Honours ==
=== Club ===
RANS Cilegon

- Liga 2 runner-up: 2021

Malut United

- Liga 2 third place (play-offs): 2023–24
