= Khoirul Huda =

Indonesian footballer

Huda
Personal information
- Full name: Khoirul Huda
- Date of birth: 25 June 1989 (age 37)
- Place of birth: Bangka, Indonesia
- Height: 1.70 m (5 ft 7 in)
- Position: Midfielder

Senior career*
Years	Team	Apps	(Gls)
2011	PS Bangka	6	(0)
2011–2018	Sriwijaya	82	(6)
2012	→ PS Bangka (loan)	17	(0)
- * Club domestic league appearances and goals as of 5 January 2013

Khoirul Huda (born June 25, 1989) is an Indonesian former footballer.

== Honours ==
=== Club honors ===
Sriwijaya

- Indonesia Super League (1): 2011–12
- Indonesian Inter Island Cup (1): 2012
