= Mokhamad Syaifuddin =

Indonesian footballer (born 1992)

Personal information
- Full name: Mokhamad Syaifuddin
- Date of birth: 9 August 1992 (age 34)
- Place of birth: Surabaya, Indonesia
- Height: 1.78 m (5 ft 10 in)
- Position: Defender

Youth career
- 2009–2012: Deportivo Indonesia
- 2010–2011: → Universidad de Concepción (loan)

Senior career*
Years	Team	Apps	(Gls)
2013–2015	Pelita Bandung Raya	13	(0)
2015–2016	PSS Sleman	12	(0)
2017–2022	Persebaya Surabaya	61	(2)
2022–2023	Dewa United	1	(0)
2023	Gresik United	0	(0)
Total		87	(2)

International career
2007	Indonesia U16	2	(0)
2009	Indonesia U19	2	(0)
2013	Indonesia U23	9	(0)

Managerial career
- 2024: Persis Solo (translator)
- 2024–: Persebaya Surabaya youth
Medal record
Men's football
Representing Indonesia
Southeast Asian Games
Silver medal – second place	2013 Naypyidaw	Team
- * Club domestic league appearances and goals

Mokhamad Syaifuddin (born in Surabaya, Indonesia, 9 August 1992) is an Indonesian former professional footballer who plays as a defender.

== Career statistics ==
=== Club ===
Appearances and goals by club, season and competition
Club	Season	League		Cup (Note: Includes Piala Indonesia)		Other (Note: Appearances in Indonesia President's Cup)		Total	
Club	Season	Apps	Goals	Apps	Goals	Apps	Goals	Apps	Goals
Pelita Bandung Raya	2013	13	0	0	0	0	0	13	0
Pelita Bandung Raya	2014	0	0	0	0	0	0	0	0
Pelita Bandung Raya	2015	0	0	0	0	0	0	0	0
Pelita Bandung Raya	Total	13	0	0	0	0	0	13	0
PSS Sleman	2016	12	0	0	0	0	0	12	0
Persebaya Surabaya	2017	12	1	0	0	0	0	12	1
Persebaya Surabaya	2018	16	0	0	0	0	0	16	0
Persebaya Surabaya	2019	24	1	3	0	6	0	24	1
Persebaya Surabaya	2020	0	0	0	0	0	0	0	0
Persebaya Surabaya	2021–22	9	0	0	0	2 (Note: Appearances in Menpora Cup)	1	11	1
Persebaya Surabaya	Total	61	2	3	0	8	1	72	3
Dewa United	2022–23	1	0	0	0	3	0	4	0
Gresik United	2023–24	0	0	0	0	0	0	0	0
Career total		87	2	3	0	11	1	101	3

== Honours ==
=== Club ===
Persebaya Surabaya

- Liga 2: 2017
- East Java Governor Cup: 2020
- Indonesia President's Cup runner-up: 2019

=== International ===
Indonesia U-23

- SEA Games silver medal: 2013
