= Rizky Pellu =

Indonesian footballer

Personal information
- Full name: Rizky Ahmad Sanjaya Pellu
- Date of birth: 26 June 1992 (age 34)
- Place of birth: Tulehu, Indonesia
- Height: 1.77 m (5 ft 10 in)
- Position: Midfielder

Team information
- Current team: Deltras
- Number: 19

Youth career
- 2009–2010: Deportivo Indonesia

Senior career*
| Years | Team | Apps | (Gls) |
| 2010–2012 | Persis Solo | 25 | (0) |
| 2013–2014 | Pelita Bandung Raya | 55 | (1) |
| 2015–2016 | Mitra Kukar | 2 | (0) |
| 2016–2021 | PSM Makassar | 116 | (17) |
| 2021–2023 | Bali United | 41 | (1) |
| 2023–2025 | PSM Makassar | 3 | (0) |
| 2023–2024 | → RANS Nusantara (loan) | 12 | (0) |
| 2024–2025 | → Persita Tangerang (loan) | 0 | (0) |
| 2026 | Malut United | 1 | (0) |
| 2026– | Deltras | 0 | (0) |

International career
| 2008 | Indonesia U16 | 3 | (0) |
| 2009 | Indonesia U19 | 5 | (0) |
| 2013–2014 | Indonesia U23 | 11 | (0) |
| 2014–2019 | Indonesia | 6 | (0) |
Medal record
Men's football
Representing Indonesia
Southeast Asian Games
| Silver medal – second place | 2013 Naypyidaw | Team |
- * Club domestic league appearances and goals as of 23 May 2026

Rizky Ahmad Sanjaya Pellu (born 26 June 1992) is an Indonesian professional footballer who plays as a midfielder for Championship club Deltras.

== International career ==
In 2008, Rizky represented the Indonesia U-16, in the 2008 AFC U-16 Championship. Rizky won his first cap for Indonesia in a friendly match against Andorra on March 26, 2014.

== Career statistics ==
=== Club ===
As of match played 23 May 2026

Club statistics
| Club | Season | League | | Cup (Note: Includes Piala Indonesia) | | Continental (Note: Appearances in AFC Cup) | | Other (Note: Appearances in Indonesia President's Cup) | | Total | |
| Club | Season | Apps | Goals | Apps | Goals | Apps | Goals | Apps | Goals | Apps | Goals |
|---|---|---|---|---|---|---|---|---|---|---|---|
| Pelita Bandung Raya | 2013 | 31 | 0 | 0 | 0 | 0 | 0 | 0 | 0 | 31 | 0 |
| Pelita Bandung Raya | 2014 | 24 | 1 | 0 | 0 | 0 | 0 | 0 | 0 | 24 | 1 |
| Pelita Bandung Raya | Total | 55 | 1 | 0 | 0 | 0 | 0 | 0 | 0 | 55 | 1 |
| Mitra Kukar | 2015 | 2 | 0 | 0 | 0 | 0 | 0 | 0 | 0 | 2 | 0 |
| PSM | 2016 | 31 | 3 | 0 | 0 | 0 | 0 | 0 | 0 | 31 | 3 |
| PSM | 2017 | 23 | 2 | 0 | 0 | 0 | 0 | 2 | 0 | 25 | 2 |
| PSM | 2018 | 29 | 6 | 0 | 0 | 0 | 0 | 0 | 0 | 29 | 6 |
| PSM | 2019 | 30 | 6 | 7 | 1 | 6 | 1 | 2 | 0 | 45 | 8 |
| PSM | 2020 | 3 | 0 | 0 | 0 | 4 | 0 | 0 | 0 | 7 | 0 |
| PSM | Total | 116 | 17 | 7 | 1 | 10 | 1 | 4 | 0 | 135 | 19 |
| Bali United | 2021–22 | 27 | 1 | 0 | 0 | 0 | 0 | 4 (Note: Appearances in Menpora Cup) | 1 | 31 | 2 |
| Bali United | 2022–23 | 14 | 0 | 0 | 0 | 3 | 0 | 3 | 0 | 20 | 0 |
| Bali United | Total | 41 | 1 | 0 | 0 | 3 | 0 | 7 | 1 | 51 | 2 |
| PSM | 2023–24 | 3 | 0 | 0 | 0 | 0 | 0 | 0 | 0 | 3 | 0 |
| RANS (loan) | 2023–24 | 12 | 0 | 0 | 0 | 0 | 0 | 0 | 0 | 12 | 0 |
| Persita (loan) | 2024–25 | 0 | 0 | 0 | 0 | 0 | 0 | 0 | 0 | 0 | 0 |
| Malut United | 2025–26 | 1 | 0 | 0 | 0 | 0 | 0 | 0 | 0 | 1 | 0 |
| Career total | | 230 | 19 | 7 | 1 | 13 | 1 | 11 | 1 | 259 | 22 |

=== International ===
As of match played 5 September 2019

Appearances and goals by national team and year
| National team | Year | Apps | Goals |
|---|---|---|---|
| Indonesia | 2014 | 2 | 0 |
| Indonesia | 2015 | 1 | 0 |
| Indonesia | 2019 | 3 | 0 |
| Total | | 6 | 0 |

== Honours ==
=== Club ===
Mitra Kukar

- General Sudirman Cup: 2015

PSM Makassar

- Piala Indonesia: 2018–19

Bali United

- Liga 1: 2021–22

=== International ===
Indonesia U-23

- SEA Games silver medal: 2013
