= Riyandi Ramadhana =

Indonesian footballer

Personal information
- Full name: Riyandi Ramadhana Putra
- Date of birth: 2 April 1991 (age 35)
- Place of birth: Jakarta, Indonesia
- Height: 1.80 m (5 ft 11 in)
- Positions: Midfielder; left back

Youth career
- 2007: SSBF Primavera
- 2008–2011: Pelita Jaya
- 2009: → Boavista (loan)

Senior career*
Years	Team	Apps	(Gls)
2010–2012	Pelita Jaya	3	(0)
2012–2015	Pelita Bandung Raya	25	(1)
2016–2017	Gresik United	18	(0)

International career
2003	Indonesia U14		
2005	Indonesia U17		
2008	Indonesia U21		
2013	Indonesia U23	1	(0)
- * Club domestic league appearances and goals as of 23:49, 5 November 2014 (UTC)

Riyandi Ramadhana (born April 2, 1991, in Jakarta) is an Indonesian former footballer who plays as a midfielder or defender.
