= Satrio Syam =

Indonesian footballer

Personal information
- Full name: Satrio Syam
- Date of birth: October 1, 1986 (age 40)
- Place of birth: Makassar, Indonesia
- Height: 1.68 m (5 ft 6 in)
- Position: Defender

Senior career*
Years	Team	Apps	(Gls)
2008–2009	PSMS Medan	22	(0)
2009–2010	Persebaya Surabaya	16	(0)
2010–2013	PSM Makassar	4	(0)
2014–2015	Persita Tangerang	4	(0)
2015	Pelita Bandung Raya	0	(0)
2015–2017	Semen Padang F.C.	28	(3)
2017–2018	Persiba Balikpapan	15	(0)

International career
2012	Indonesia	1	(0)
- * Club domestic league appearances and goals as of 23:19, 16 January 2015 (UTC)

Satrio Syam (born 1 October 1986) is an Indonesian former footballer who plays as a defender.

== Career ==
In November 2015, he signed with SPFC.
