= Gastón Castaño =

Argentine footballer

Personal information
- Full name: Cristián Gastón Castaño
- Date of birth: 8 June 1985 (age 41)
- Place of birth: Santiago del Estero, Argentina
- Height: 1.82 m (5 ft 11 1/2 in)
- Position: Forward

Youth career
- 1997–2003: Boca Juniors

Senior career*
Years	Team	Apps	(Gls)
2004–2005	Armenio	21	(11)
2005–2006	San Lorenzo	9	(0)
2006–2007	PSS Sleman	30	(10)
2007–2008	PSIS Semarang	28	(6)
2008–2009	Persiba Balikpapan	22	(7)
2010–2011	PSMS Medan	30	(15)
2011–2012	Gresik United	32	(15)
2012–2015	Pelita Bandung Raya	50	(20)
2017	Nakhon Pathom	12	(1)
2017	Hong Kong Rangers	6	(0)
2018	Persela Lamongan	1	(0)
Total		241	(85)
- * Club domestic league appearances and goals

Cristián Gastón Castaño (born 8 June 1985) is a former Argentine professional footballer.

== Club career ==
A graduate from the academy of the Boca Juniors, he played for San Lorenzo before spending the majority of his career in Indonesia, with exceptions in 2017 when he played for Thai side Nakhon Pathom and the Hong Kong Rangers. A year later, he retired.

== Personal life ==
He married Indonesian actress and singer Julia Perez in 2013. They divorced in 2016, but remained close until her death from cervical cancer in June 2017.
