= Kim Kurniawan =

Indonesian footballer

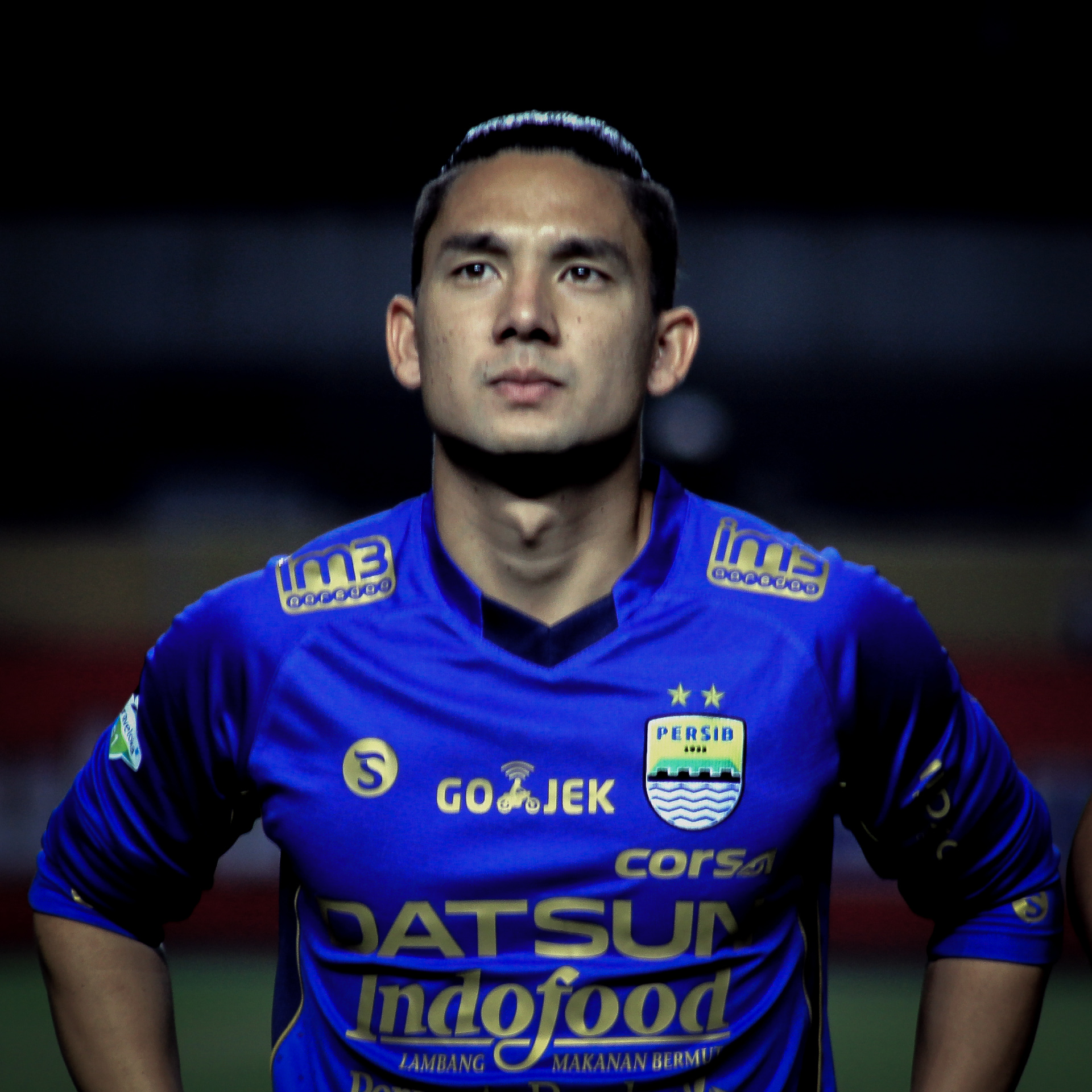
- Kim playing for Persib Bandung in 2017

Personal information
- Full name: Kim Jeffrey Kurniawan
- Date of birth: 23 March 1990 (age 36)
- Place of birth: Mühlacker, Germany
- Height: 1.68 m (5 ft 6 in)
- Position: Midfielder

Team information
- Current team: PSS Sleman
- Number: 23

Youth career
- –1996: FV Knittlingen
- 1996–2009: Karlsruher SC

Senior career*
Years	Team	Apps	(Gls)
2008–2009	Karlsruher SC	0	(0)
2009–2010	FC 07 Heidelsheim	12	(2)
2011–2013	Persema Malang	65	(5)
2014–2015	Pelita Bandung Raya	28	(2)
2016–2021	Persib Bandung	81	(7)
2021–	PSS Sleman	114	(10)

International career
2012	Indonesia U23	1	(0)
2015	Indonesia	1	(0)
- * Club domestic league appearances and goals as of 3 May 2026

Kim Jeffrey Kurniawan (born 23 March 1990) is a professional footballer who plays as a midfielder for Super League club PSS Sleman. Born in Germany, he represents the Indonesia national team.

== Early life ==
Kurniawan was born in the town of Mühlacker to a German mother and an Indonesian father of Chinese heritage. His paternal grandfather, Kwee Hong Sing, was also a footballer who played for Persija Jakarta and the Indonesia national team in the 1950s.

Born with German nationality, Kurniawan decided to take up Indonesian citizenship after the PSSI, the football association of Indonesia, offered him a naturalization path that could pave way for him to win a position on the national team. In December 2010, he officially received an Indonesian passport and, after Cristian Gonzáles, became the second naturalised football player in that country; Gonzáles had done so in November 2010. Kurniawan's sister, Jennifer Kurniawan, is married to Irfan Bachdim, another naturalised Indonesian though born in the Netherlands. Bachdim and Kurniawan, who are both playing for PSS Sleman, came to Indonesia at the same time in 2010 and became teammates at Persema Malang in 2011.

== Club career ==
=== Early career ===
After training at a football academy in Karlsruhe, Kurniawan, then aged 6, was recruited by German club Karlsruher SC, then playing in the Bundesliga. He stayed there for 12 years, participating in youth games against international clubs such as Inter Milan, Valencia and top German clubs like Bayern Munich, Borussia Dortmund, Schalke 04 and Bayer 04 Leverkusen. However, Kurniawan suffered a knee injury at 18 in his last junior season, ruining his dream to play in the highest levels of German football.

=== Heidelsheim ===
Kurniawan's knee injury kept him away from the ball for the better part of a year. Eventually, he joined FC 07 Heidelsheim in the Verbandsliga, tier-six of German football, at the time. He enjoyed a successful first season, playing in every game and scoring two goals. He had agreed to extend his contract, but this changed after he received an invitation to play in Indonesia with a possibility to play for the national team of his father's country.

=== Persema Malang ===
Kurniawan went to Indonesia in 2010 with two other Europe-based footballers of Indonesian descent, Irfan Bachdim and Alessandro Trabucco. His career there started with an invitation to charity games in East Java cities of Surabaya and Malang in 2010. After the matches, Timo Scheunemann, a German who was coaching top-flight team Persema Malang contacted Kurniawan and offered him a trial, in which the latter impressed. Scheunemann recruited Kurniawan and Bachdim to play in the 2011 season of the breakaway Indonesian Premier League, irking the PSSI that later delayed Kurniawan's naturalization process. Without an Indonesian passport at the time, Kurniawan could not play as local player until he officially became Indonesian. An injury also kept him from playing on the national team for the Suzuki AFF Cup 2010. Despite the challenges, Kurniawan signed a contract with Persema Malang in 2011 and stayed for almost three years.

Amid Persema's financial problems in late 2013, Kurniawan tried to play in Thailand but did not secure a contract despite trials at several clubs.

=== Pelita Bandung Raya ===
The failure in Thailand led Kurniawan to look for opportunities in Indonesia again. Kurniawan in December 2013 signed up for Pelita Bandung Raya that played in Bandung, West Java in the Indonesia Super League. He played for two seasons there under Serbian coach Dejan Antonic until the club was sold in late 2015 after going through financial difficulties.

=== Persib Bandung ===
Kurniawan in early 2016 joined Persib Bandung after the top club in Bandung hired coach Antonic. During the FIFA one-year suspension on Indonesian football, Kurniawan was part of the Persib team that participated in unauthorized tournaments in his first season, including the 2016 Indonesia Soccer Championship A where the club finished fifth and the 2016 Bhayangkara Cup that saw the team went all the way to the final.

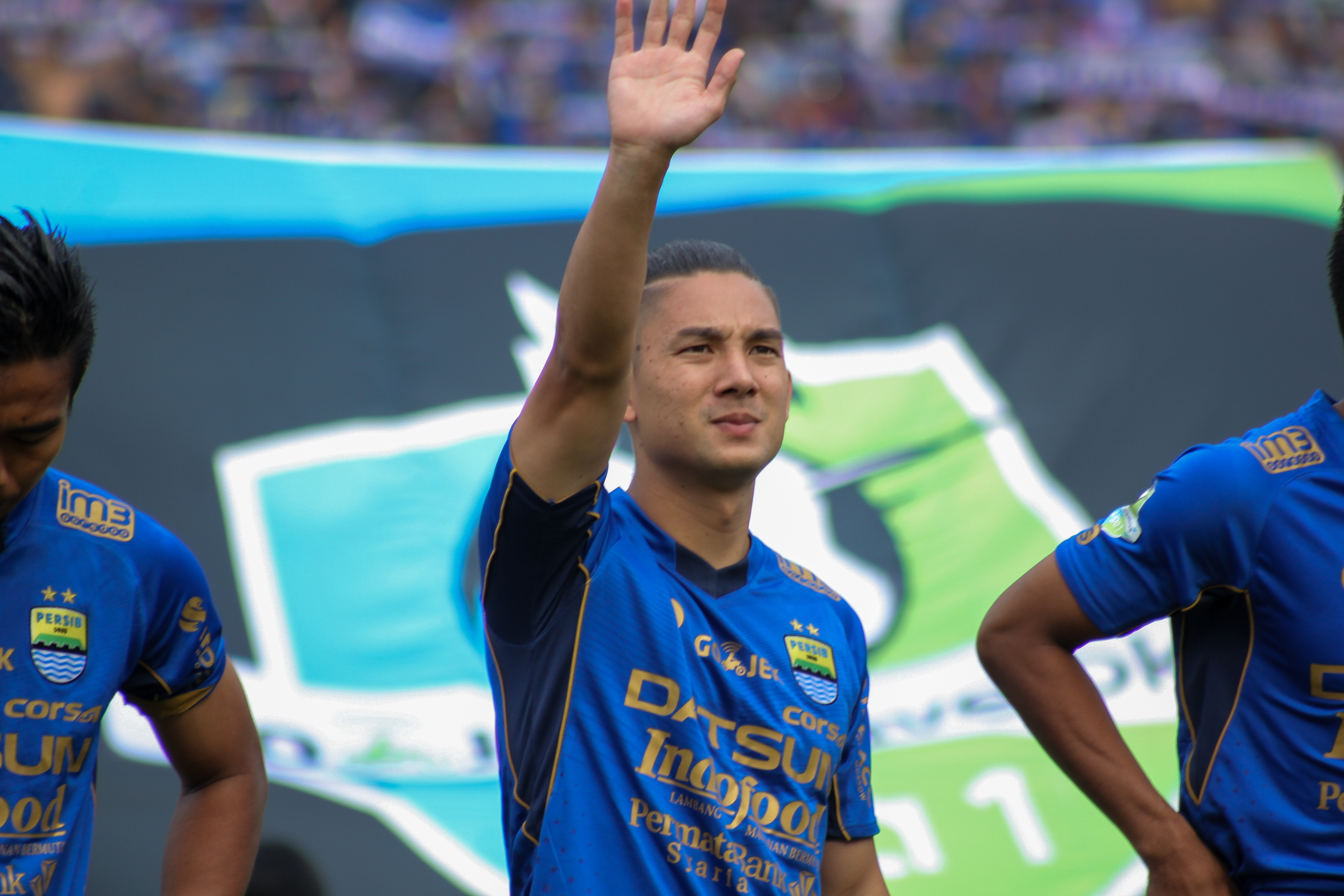
Kim Kurniawan at Persib

Kurniawan's second season saw his team finish 13th in the 2017 Liga 1, the first full-season of top-flight Indonesian football after FIFA lifted the suspension. Unfortunately, injuries affected his career again. He broke his fibula at the end of the season after being tackled by a Persija Jakarta player in the traditionally hostile Persija-Persib match. Kurniawan had to sit out most of the 2018 Liga 1. During recovery, Kurniawan developed an array of businesses in Bandung, ranging from a clothing line to a barbershop that has gained popularity among fans.

Kurniawan's undeterred will to come back from injury in late 2018 that led to a revived performance in the 2019 Liga 1 season, along with a number of goals, and his popular businesses won support from Persib fans who affectionately call him "Little Kimmy". Fans first thought he would retire in Bandung. However, Kurniawan shocked Persib loyalists when he decided to move in February 2021.

=== PSS Sleman ===
Kurniawan in early 2021, before the pre-season Piala Menpora tournament, decided to join PSS Sleman. His main reason was to reunite with coach Dejan Antonic and brother-in-law Irfan Bachdim, who both joined the up-and-coming Liga 1 club for the 2020 season that abruptly ended due to the COVID-19 pandemic. Kurniawan made his PSS Sleman debut in a pre-season tournament 2021 Menpora Cup against Madura United on 23 March 2021. On 5 September 2021, Kurniawan made his league debut for PSS Sleman, playing as a starter in a 1–1 draw over Persija Jakarta. He captained his team for the first time, in a match against Bali United on 27 October.

On 2 February 2022, he scored his first league goal in 2–3 lose over Persik Kediri. On 24 March, he scored equalizer for the club, scoring a penalty shoot-out in the 31st minute and provided an assist to Mario Maslać in PSS's 3–2 win over Persela Lamongan. On 31 March, he played his closed match of the season with scored in a 2–0 win over Persija Jakarta. The victory made PSS Sleman finish in 13th place in the final standings. PSS closed the league this season by collecting 39 points. Therefore, PSS Sleman is still in the highest caste of the Liga 1 next season and avoid relegation.

Ahead of the new season, he suffered a dislocated shoulder. The injury had to make him go to the operating table, causing him to miss the training sessions and even a few weeks of pre-season matches.

It's a long break until the next season starts. So, I can use that time to heal

— Kurniawan speaking about his injury recovery with PSS Sleman after surgery.

Kurniawan is also confirmed to be absent throughout the preparation period for PSS Sleman to face 2022–23 Liga 1, he said it would take at least three months for him to fully recover and join the team. On 23 August 2022, he made his comeback after dislocated shoulder as an 79th-minute substitute against Persik Kediri, also scored his first goal of the season in the 86th-minute in a 0–2 away win at Brawijaya Stadium. On 29 September, Kurniawan scored the opening goal in a 1–2 home lose over Persita Tangerang, scored a header off a pass from Bagus Nirwanto in the 31st minute. Kurniawan then scored against Bhayangkara in a 3–1 away lose on 5 December. He then played the full 90 minutes and provided the one-two pass for Zé Valente's goal in a 1–2 win against Bali United on 19 December.

On 9 February 2023, Kurniawan scored in a 2–1 win over Persik Kediri, the second of which was a volley into the bottom left hand corner of the goal. On 17 February, Kurniawan scored equalizer in a 1–3 home lose over Dewa United. He added his sixth goals for the club on 7 April with one goal against Bali United in a 2–0 home win at Maguwoharjo Stadium.

== International career ==
Kurniawan came to play in Indonesia in 2010 after injuries dashed any hope of getting called by his birth country Germany. Tempted by the possibility of representing his father's country, he took up the PSSI naturalization offer. In 2011, Kurniawan received the call from the Indonesia national under-23 team to play in the Southeast Asian Games 2011. He trained in several cities, including Hong Kong but did not break into the final squad.

In 2015, he was invited to the official FIFA friendly games against Cameroon and Myanmar. During the match in Sidoarjo on 30 March 2015 against Myanmar, Kurniawan was brought on and made his debut for the senior team in a 2–1 win.

== Honours ==
PSS Sleman

- Championship runner up: 2025–26
- Menpora Cup third place: 2021

Individual

- Menpora Cup Best Eleven: 2021

== Filmography ==
- Tendangan dari Langit (2011)
- Aku Cinta Kamu (2014)

== See also ==
- List of Indonesia international footballers born outside Indonesia
