= Anggo Yulian =

Indonesian footballer

Personal information
- Full name: Anggo Yulian Hari Sapta
- Date of birth: 7 July 1987 (age 39)
- Place of birth: Denpasar, Bali, Indonesia
- Height: 1.78 m (5 ft 10 in)
- Position: Midfielder

Senior career*
Years	Team	Apps	(Gls)
2009–2010	Persiba Balikpapan	6	(0)
2010–2011	Persijap Jepara	22	(0)
2011–2012	Arema FC	3	(1)
2014	Pelita Bandung Raya	14	(0)
2016–2019	PSGC Ciamis	7	(0)
- * Club domestic league appearances and goals as of 21:24, 10 December 2018 (UTC)

Anggo Yulian (born 7 July 1987) is an Indonesian footballer who currently plays for PSGC Ciamis as a midfielder in the Liga 2.
