= Chairul Rifan =

Indonesian association footballer

Personal information
- Full name: Mohammad Chairul Rifan
- Date of birth: 3 December 1989 (age 36)
- Place of birth: Bondowoso, Indonesia
- Height: 1.76 m (5 ft 9 in)
- Position: Defender

Team information
- Current team: Perseba Bangkalan

Senior career*
Years	Team	Apps	(Gls)
2006–2008	PSIL Lumajang		
2009–2010	Persedikab Kediri	3	(0)
2011	Persik Kediri	14	(0)
2012	Jakarta FC 1928	11	(0)
2013	Arema Indonesia	8	(0)
2013	Persenga Nganjuk	4	(0)
2014–2015	Pelita Bandung Raya	18	(1)
2016	Persepam Madura Utama	16	(0)
2017	Persegres Gresik	13	(0)
2017	Persepam Madura Utama	9	(0)
2018	Madura	26	(0)
2019–2021	PSCS Cilacap	27	(0)
2022	Persiraja Banda Aceh	16	(0)
2022–2024	Sulut United	28	(0)
2024–2025	Persikab Bandung	8	(0)
2025–2026	Persinga Ngawi	26	(0)
2026–	Perseba Bangkalan	0	(0)
- * Club domestic league appearances and goals as of 23:40, 11 January 2025 (UTC)

Mohammad Chairul Rifan (born 3 December 1989) is an Indonesian professional footballer who plays as a defender for Liga 4 club Perseba Bangkalan.

== Club career ==
=== Madura FC ===
In 2018, Chairul Rifan signed a contract with Indonesian Liga 2 club Madura. He made 26 league appearances for Madura FC.

=== PSCS Cilacap ===
He was signed for PSCS Cilacap to play in the Liga 2 in the 2019 season. Rifan made 27 league appearances for PSCS Cilacap.

=== Persiraja Banda Aceh ===
In January 2022, Rifan signed a contract with Liga 1 club Persiraja Banda Aceh. He made his league debut in a 1–0 loss against PSIS Semarang on 12 January 2022 as a substitute for Assanur Rijal in the 54th minute at the Kompyang Sujana Stadium, Denpasar.
