= Muhammad Arsyad =

Indonesian footballer

M. Arsyad
Personal information
- Full name: Muhammad Arsyad
- Date of birth: 22 June 1993 (age 33)
- Place of birth: Indonesia
- Height: 1.65 m (5 ft 5 in)
- Position: Midfielder

Youth career
- 2009–2011: Deportivo Indonesia

Senior career*
Years	Team	Apps	(Gls)
2013–2014	Pelita Bandung Raya	21	(2)
2015	PS TNI	0	(0)
2016	Persik Kediri	16	(0)
2017	Persepam Madura Utama	11	(0)
- * Club domestic league appearances and goals

Muhammad Arsyad (born June 22, 1993) is an Indonesian former footballer who played as a midfielder.
