= Iman Fathurahman =

Indonesian footballer

Personal information
- Full name: Iman Fathurahman
- Date of birth: 31 May 1994 (age 32)
- Place of birth: Bandung, Indonesia
- Height: 1.75 m (5 ft 9 in)
- Positions: Defensive midfielder; centre-back

Team information
- Current team: PSGC Ciamis
- Number: 5

Senior career*
Years	Team	Apps	(Gls)
2013–2015	Pelita Bandung Raya	42	(2)
2016	PS TIRA	9	(0)
2017	Persika Karawang	3	(1)
2017	757 Kepri Jaya	3	(0)
2018	PS TIRA	2	(0)
2019	Sulut United	16	(0)
2021	Persija Jakarta	1	(0)
2022	Persikab Bandung	4	(0)
2023–2024	Persikabo 1973	9	(0)
2024–2025	PSPS Pekanbaru	11	(0)
2025–2026	PSS Sleman	7	(1)
2026–	PSGC Ciamis	0	(0)
- * Club domestic league appearances and goals as of 9 May 2026

Iman Fathurahman (born on 31 May 1994) is an Indonesian professional footballer who plays as a defensive midfielder or centre-back for Championship club PSGC Ciamis.

== Club career ==
=== Sulut United ===
On 20 June 2019, Fathurohman signed a one-year contract with Liga 2 club Sulut United. He made 16 league appearances for Sulut United in the 2019 Liga 2 (Indonesia)

== Honours ==
PSS Sleman

- Championship runner up: 2025–26
