= Hasan Basri Lohy =

Indonesian footballer (born 1986)

Basri Lohy
Personal information
- Full name: Hasan Basri Lohy
- Date of birth: 8 September 1986 (age 40)
- Place of birth: Halmahera, Indonesia
- Height: 1.63 m (5 ft 4 in)
- Position: Forward

Senior career*
| Years | Team | Apps | (Gls) |
| 2007–2008 | Persipon Pontianak | 31 | (11) |
| 2008–2009 | PSS Sleman | 29 | (6) |
| 2009–2010 | PSIM Yogyakarta | 27 | (0) |
| 2010–2011 | PSIS Semarang | 28 | (2) |
| 2013 | Persepar Palangkaraya | 12 | (4) |
| 2014 | Pelita Bandung Raya | 2 | (0) |
| 2015 | Pusamania Borneo | 0 | (0) |
| 2016 | PSM Makassar | 11 | (0) |
| 2017 | PPSM Magelang | 24 | (5) |
| 2017–2018 | Aceh United | 4 | (0) |
| 2018 | Perserang Serang | 8 | (0) |
| 2019–2020 | Persikat Ketapang | 8 | (0) |
- * Club domestic league appearances and goals as of 19:24, 22 January 2015 (UTC)

Basri Lohy (born 8 September 1986) is an Indonesian professional footballer who plays as a forward. He last played with Persikat Ketapang in the 2019 Liga 3.

== Career ==
He previously played for Persipon Pontianak, PSIM Yogyakarta, PSIS Semarang and Kalteng Putra FC.

=== Pelita Bandung Raya ===
On 29 December 2013, he signed with Pelita Bandung Raya for the 2014 Indonesia Super League season.

=== Pusamania Borneo ===
On January 20, 2015, he signed with Pusamania.

== Honours ==
=== Club ===
Persikat Ketapang

- Liga 3 West Kalimantan zone: 2019
