= Boban Nikolić =

Serbian footballer

Personal information
- Full name: Boban Nikolić
- Date of birth: 8 October 1980 (age 46)
- Place of birth: Kragujevac, SFR Yugoslavia
- Height: 1.88 m (6 ft 2 in)
- Position: Left-back

Youth career
- Radnički Kragujevac

Senior career*
Years	Team	Apps	(Gls)
2001–2005	Radnički Kragujevac	65	(3)
2001	→ Sloga Lipnički Šor (loan)	24	(0)
2005–2006	Šumadija 1903	26	(3)
2006–2007	Banat Zrenjanin	20	(0)
2007–2008	Radnički Kragujevac	20	(0)
2008	Shahin Bushehr	30	(0)
2008–2009	Radnički Kragujevac	30	(2)
2009	→ Dinamo Vranje (loan)	22	(0)
2009–2010	Jagodina	23	(0)
2010–2012	Zemun		
2012–2013	Pobeda Beloševac		
2014–2015	Pelita Bandung Raya	28	(2)
- * Club domestic league appearances and goals

Boban Nikolić (Serbian Cyrillic: Бобан Николић; born 8 October 1980) is a Serbian retired footballer who played as a left-back.
