= Dolly Gultom =

Indonesian footballer

Personal information
- Full name: Dolly Ramadhan Gultom
- Date of birth: 5 March 1993 (age 33)
- Place of birth: Jakarta, Indonesia
- Height: 1.68 m (5 ft 6 in)
- Positions: Right-back; midfielder

Team information
- Current team: Persikad Depok
- Number: 53

Youth career
- 2010–2011: Deportivo Indonesia

Senior career*
Years	Team	Apps	(Gls)
2011–2012	Persis Solo	11	(0)
2013–2015	Pelita Bandung Raya	27	(1)
2016	PSPS Riau	15	(0)
2017	757 Kepri Jaya	6	(0)
2018	Mitra Kukar	0	(0)
2019	Sulut United	8	(0)
2020	Muba Babel United	1	(1)
2021	PSM Makassar	2	(0)
2022–2024	PSCS Cilacap	24	(0)
2024–2025	Persipal Palu	4	(0)
2025	Sriwijaya	6	(0)
2026–	Persikad Depok	7	(0)

International career
2011	Indonesia U19	3	(0)
- * Club domestic league appearances and goals as of 23:51, 12 April 2026 (UTC)

Dolly Ramadhan Gultom (born 5 March 1993) is an Indonesian professional footballer who plays as a right-back and midfielder for Championship club Persikad Depok.

== Club career ==
=== Sulut United ===
In 2019, Dolly Gultom signed a one-year contract with Indonesian Liga 2 club Sulut United.

=== Muba Babel United ===
He was signed for Muba Babel United to play in Liga 2 in the 2020 season. This season was suspended on 27 March 2020 due to the COVID-19 pandemic. The season was abandoned and was declared void on 20 January 2021.

=== PSM Makassar ===
On 24 August 2021, Gultom confirmed his transfer to PSM Makassar. Gultom made his debut on 12 September 2021 in a match against Madura United at the Gelora Bung Karno Madya Stadium, Jakarta.

=== PSCS Cilacap ===
On 17 June 2022, it was announced that Gultom would be joining PSCS Cilacap for the 2022-23 Liga 2 campaign.
