= Lamarana Diallo =

Guinean footballer (born 1991)

Personal information
- Full name: Mamadou Lamarana Diallo
- Date of birth: 28 August 1991 (age 35)
- Place of birth: Labé, Guinea
- Height: 1.70 m (5 ft 7 in)
- Position: Forward

Senior career*
Years	Team	Apps	(Gls)
2008	Persibat Batang	9	(2)
2009	PSS Sleman	8	(3)
2010	Perseru Serui	22	(8)
2011	PSGL Gayo Lues	10	(2)
2012	PPSM Magelang	9	(2)
2013	Persenga Nganjuk	16	(12)
2014	Persih Tembilahan	7	(2)
2014–2015	PSM Makassar	8	(1)
2015	Persela Lamongan	3	(1)
2019	PSMS Medan	1	(0)
2019	Persatu Tuban	10	(5)
2021	Persiku Kudus	1	(0)
Total		104	(38)
- * Club domestic league appearances and goals as of 23:57, 21 October 2021 (UTC)

Mamadou Lamarana Diallo (born 28 August 1991) is a Guinean former footballer who last played as a forward for Liga 3 club Persiku Kudus in Indonesia.

== Career ==
=== PSMS Medan ===
He was signed for PSMS Medan to play in Liga 2 in the 2019 season. Diallo played 1 time without scoring a goal.

=== Persatu Tuban ===
In middle season 2019, Lamarana Diallo signed a year contract with Persatu Tuban from PSMS Medan. He made 10 league appearances and scored 5 goals for Persatu Tuban.

=== Persiku Kudus ===
He was signed for Persiku Kudus to play in Liga 3 in the 2021 season. Diallo made 1 league appearance and without scoring a goal for Persiku.

== Personal life ==
Diallo is married to Indonesian women from Semarang. Foreigners who are legally married to Indonesian citizens is one of criteria that fulfill by Diallo to become Indonesian citizen.
