= Wildansyah =

Indonesian footballer

Personal information
- Full name: Wildansyah Edy
- Date of birth: 3 January 1987 (age 39)
- Place of birth: Bandung, West Java, Indonesia
- Height: 1.73 m (5 ft 8 in)
- Position: Defender

Team information
- Current team: Pesik Kuningan
- Number: 4

Youth career
- 2000–2007: Persib Bandung

Senior career*
Years	Team	Apps	(Gls)
2008–2012	Persib Bandung	47	(1)
2012–2013	Persisam Samarinda	9	(0)
2013–2014	Pelita Bandung Raya	23	(1)
2015–2016	Sriwijaya	22	(0)
2017–2019	Persib Bandung	15	(0)
2018	→ Borneo (loan)	17	(2)
2019–2023	Borneo	66	(3)
2023–2024	Persela Lamongan	5	(0)
2025	Persikota Tangerang	4	(0)
2025–	Pesik Kuningan	12	(0)
- * Club domestic league appearances and goals as of 22:23, 11 July 2026 (UTC)

Wildansyah Edy (born 3 January 1987) is an Indonesian professional footballer who plays as a defender for Liga Nusantara club Pesik Kuningan.

== Club career ==
=== Persib Bandung ===
At the beginning of the 2008/2009 season, Wildansyah joined Persib Bandung in the Indonesia Super League who coached by Jaya Hartono. He made his debut in the Piala Indonesia against Persires Rengat but he has not made his debut in the Liga Indonesia. He made his debut in Indonesia Super League on 21 April 2009 against Persita Tangerang in Bandung. He was again trusted by Jaya Hartono to play in a match against Deltras F.C. as a substitute.

=== Pelita Bandung Raya ===
On 31 December 2013, he was signed by Pelita Bandung Raya.

=== Sriwijaya FC ===
On 30 November 2014, he was signed by Sriwijaya.

=== Persib Bandung ===
In 2017, Wildansyah signed a contract with Indonesian Liga 1 club Persib Bandung.

==== Borneo (loan) ====
He was signed for Borneo to play in the Liga 1 in the 2018 season, on loan from Persib Bandung.

== Honours ==
Borneo

- Piala Presiden runner-up: 2022

Pesik Kuningan

- Liga 4 runner up: 2025–26
