= Rafid Lestaluhu =

Indonesian footballer

Personal information
- Full name: Rafid Chadafi Lestaluhu
- Date of birth: 16 October 1993 (age 33)
- Place of birth: Tulehu, Indonesia
- Height: 1.70 m (5 ft 7 in)
- Position: Winger

Youth career
- 2010–2013: Pelita Jaya

Senior career*
Years	Team	Apps	(Gls)
2013–2015	Pelita Bandung Raya	4	(0)
2016	Bhayangkara	0	(0)
2017	Persita Tangerang	6	(0)
2019	Bandung United	0	(0)
2021	Persibat Batang	0	(0)
- * Club domestic league appearances and goals as of 08:41, 22 March 2019 (UTC)

Rafid Chadafi Lestaluhu (born 16 October 1993) is an Indonesian former footballer who plays as a winger.

== Career ==
In 2015, he signed with Persita Tangerang.

== Personal life ==
Lestaluhu is the twin brother of Abduh Lestaluhu, they have an older brother Ramdani Lestaluhu and a younger brother Pandi Lestaluhu who are also professional footballers.
