= Eka Santika =

Indonesian footballer (born 1982)

Personal information
- Full name: Eka Santika
- Date of birth: April 28, 1982 (age 44)
- Place of birth: Sumedang, Indonesia
- Height: 1.80 m (5 ft 11 in)
- Position: Striker

Senior career*
| Years | Team | Apps | (Gls) |
| 2003–2004 | Persib Bandung | 23 | (1) |
| 2005 | Sriwijaya FC | 12 | (0) |
| 2006–2007 | Mitra Kukar | 24 | (4) |
| 2008 | Pro Duta FC | 13 | (0) |
| 2008–2009 | → Persikab Bandung (loan) | 10 | (0) |
| 2009 | → PSS Sleman (loan) | 8 | (0) |
| 2010–2011 | Persiba Balikpapan | 10 | (0) |
| 2011–2013 | Persijap Jepara | 18 | (0) |
- * Club domestic league appearances and goals

Eka Santika (born 28 April 1982) is an Indonesian former footballer who plays as a striker.

== Club career ==
=== Persib ===
In 2003, he was a part of the Persib squad that won 2-1 against Semarang.

=== Sriwijaya ===
When playing for Sriwijaya, he scored in the Copa Indonesia (currently Piala Indonesia).

=== Persikab ===
On 6 August 2008, Eka Santika agreed to personal terms with Persikab and the club confirmed that it had signed Eka Santika on a loan.

=== Balikpapan ===
Eka Santika completed his move to Persiba on 7 August 2010, on a year contract. He was handed the number 37 shirt.

He made his debut at August 28, 2010 in the Indonesian Inter Island Cup match against Sriwijaya. He came in as a substitute at 58th minute, replacing Eki Nurhakim, and scored his first pre-season goal for the club.

== Career statistics ==
=== All competitions ===
| Season | Club | Country | Domestic League | Matches | Goals |
|---|---|---|---|---|---|
| 2003 | Persib Bandung | Indonesia | Premier Division | | |
| 2004 | Persib Bandung | Indonesia | Premier Division | | |
| 2005 | Sriwijaya FC | Indonesia | Premier Division | | |
| 2006 | Mitra Kukar | Indonesia | First Division | | |
| 2007 | Mitra Kukar | Indonesia | First Division | | |
| 2008–09 | Pro Duta FC | Indonesia | First Division | | |
| 2008–09 | Persikab | Indonesia | Premier Division | | |
| 2008–09 | PSS Sleman | Indonesia | Premier Division | | |
| 2009–10 | Pro Duta FC | Indonesia | Premier Division | | |
| 2010–11 | Persiba Balikpapan | Indonesia | Indonesia Super League | 22 | 0 |
| Total | | | | | |

Note: Prior to 2008, Premier Division was the top flight football league in Indonesia before being relegated to second level
after the establishment of Indonesia Super League in 2008
