= Talaohu Musafri =

Indonesian footballer

Personal information
- Full name: Talaohu Abdul Musafri
- Date of birth: 19 February 1982 (age 44)
- Place of birth: Bacan, Indonesia
- Height: 1.66 m (5 ft 5 in)
- Position: Forward

Senior career*
Years	Team	Apps	(Gls)
2004–2006	PSS Sleman	26	(2)
2006–2009	Persiba Balikpapan	65	(28)
2009–2010	Persija Jakarta	28	(4)
2010–2012	Arema Indonesia	35	(10)
2012–2013	Perseman Manokwari	12	(6)
2013	Persebaya 1927	1	(0)
2014	Pelita Bandung Raya	27	(5)
2014–2015	Barito Putera	3	(1)
2016–2017	Sriwijaya	25	(4)
2017–2018	Barito Putera	20	(1)
2019	Badak Lampung	18	(1)
2020	PSIM Yogyakarta	1	(1)
2021	Badak Lampung	3	(0)
2022	Bantul United	0	(0)
2023–2024	757 Kepri Jaya	5	(4)
Total		269	(67)

International career
2008–2014	Indonesia	11	(1)
- * Club domestic league appearances and goals

Talaohu Abdul Musafri (commonly known as T.A. Musafri) (born 19 February 1982) is an Indonesian former footballer who plays as a forward.

== Club career ==
He made his name famous when he played for Persiba where he scored 28 goals in 65 appearances. In December 2014, he signed with Barito Putera.

== International career ==
He was included in the Indonesian squad for the 2011 Asian Cup qualification.

=== International goals ===
Goal	Date	Venue	Opponent	Score	Result	Competition
1	13 November 2008	Thuwunna Stadium, Yangon, Myanmar	Bangladesh	2–0	2–0	2008 Myanmar Grand Royal Challenge Cup

== Honours ==
- Indonesia Super League Fair Play Award : 2008–09
