= Deportivo Indonesia =

- Full name: Deportivo Indonesia
- Founded: 2007; 18 years ago, as Sociedad Anónima Deportiva Indonesia; 2011; 14 years ago, as Deportivo Indonesia
- Dissolved: December 2013; 11 years ago
- Owner: Bakrie Group
- Website: www.sad-indonesia.com/en

Deportivo Indonesia was an association football club consisting of Indonesian under-19 and under-17 level players who were involved in a training program in Uruguay and playing in lower divisions of the Uruguayan football league system (Quarta and Quinta Division) for at least 6 years. The team was lauded as the future Indonesia national football team.

The club were established in 2007 as Sociedad Anónima Deportiva Indonesia or SAD Indonesia. Starting from the 2011 season, the club changed their name to Deportivo Indonesia. In December 2013, Deportivo Indonesia were dissolved as the contract between Bakrie Group with the Uruguayan Football Association expired.
