= 2010–11 USM Blida season =

USM Blida
2010–11 season
- Chairman: Mohamed Zaïm
- Head coach: Kamel Mouassa
- Stadium: Stade Mustapha Tchaker; Stade Frères Brakni
- Ligue 1: 16th
- Algerian Cup: Round of 32
- Top goalscorer: League: Abdelkader Harizi (5 goals); All: Abdelkader Harizi (5 goals)

In the 2010–11 season, the Algerian football team USM Blida competed in Ligue 1, the highest level division in the Algerian football league system, for the 26th time. They finished the season in last place, and were relegated to Ligue 2 for the next season. As of 2024, they have not yet returned to Ligue 1.

They were also one of the 64 teams that competed in the Algerian Cup. After a first round victory against RUDS Batna, they were eliminated in the second round with a loss to JSM Béjaïa.

== Squad list ==
Players and squad numbers last updated on 18 November 2015.
Note: Flags indicate national team as has been defined under FIFA eligibility rules. Players may hold more than one non-FIFA nationality.

No.	Nat.	Position	Name	Date of birth (age)	Signed from
Goalkeepers
Defenders
Midfielders
Forwards

== Competitions ==
=== Overview ===
Competition	Record								Started round	Final position / round	First match	Last match
Competition	G	W	D	L	GF	GA	GD	Win %	Started round	Final position / round	First match	Last match
Ligue 1	30	7	8	15	16	30	−14	23.33	—N/a	16th	25 September 2010	8 July 2011
Algerian Cup	2	1	0	1	5	2	+3	50.00	Round of 64	Round of 32	31 December 2010	5 March 2011
Total	32	8	8	16	21	32	−11	25.00				

Updated to match played 9 May 2017
Source: Competitions

== League table ==
Pos	Team	Pld	W	D	L	GF	GA	GD	Pts	Qualification or relegation
12	WA Tlemcen	30	10	7	13	35	36	−1	37	
13	MC El Eulma	30	9	9	12	32	40	−8	36	
14	USM Annaba (R)	30	10	6	14	23	34	−11	36	Relegation to Ligue Professionnelle 2
15	CA Bordj Bou Arreridj (R)	30	8	5	17	21	46	−25	29	Relegation to Ligue Professionnelle 2
16	USM Blida (R)	30	7	8	15	16	30	−14	29	Relegation to Ligue Professionnelle 2

Updated to match(es) played on 19 April 2018. Source: DZFoot
Rules for classification: 1) points; 2) head-to-head points; 3) head-to-head goal difference; 4) goal difference; 5) total goals; 6) fairplay ranking; 7) playoff.
(R) Relegated

=== Results summary ===
Overall								Home						Away					
Pld	W	D	L	GF	GA	GD	Pts	W	D	L	GF	GA	GD	W	D	L	GF	GA	GD
30	7	8	15	16	30	−14	29	6	3	6	8	11	−3	1	5	9	8	19	−11

Last updated: 29 December 2014.
Source: Competitive matches

=== Results by round ===
Round	1	2	3	4	5	6	7	8	9	10	11	12	13	14	15	16	17	18	19	20	21	22	23	24	25	26	27	28	29	30
Ground	H	A	H	A	H	A	H	A	H	A	H	H	A	H	A	A	H	A	H	A	H	A	H	A	H	A	A	H	A	H
Result	D	D	L	D	L	L	L	D	W	L	W	W	L	W	L	D	L	L	W	D	L	L	W	L	D	L	W	D	L	L
Position	8	12	14	14	14	15	15	16	15	15	13	13	13	11	12	14	15	15	13	13	14	15	14	15	15	15	15	15	15	15

Source: Competitive matches
A = Away; H = Home; W = Win; D = Draw; L = Loss

=== Matches ===
Win Draw Loss

25 September 2010 Round 1	USM Blida	0–0	MC Oran	Blida
17:00		Soccerway report		Stadium: Stade Mustapha Tchaker; Referee: Farouk Houasnia

2 October 2010 Round 2	CA Bordj Bou Arreridj	0–0	USM Blida	Bordj Bou Arréridj
15:00		Soccerway report		Stadium: Stade 20 Août 1955; Referee: Redouane Necib

16 October 2010 Round 3	USM Blida	0–2	ASO Chlef	Blida
17:00		Soccerway report	Soudani 6'; Djediat 45' (pen.)	Stadium: Stade Mustapha Tchaker; Referee: Farouk Mial

22 October 2010 Round 4	USM Annaba	1–1	USM Blida	Annaba
19:00	Ounnas 22'	Soccerway report	Djemaouni 90'	Stadium: May 19, 1956 Stadium; Referee: Rafik Achouri

26 October 2010 Round 5	USM Blida	0–3	ES Sétif	Blida
17:00		Soccerway report	Djallit 18'; Metref 87'; Djabou 89'	Stadium: Stade Mustapha Tchaker; Referee: Mohamed Benouza

30 October 2010 Round 6	USM Alger	3–1	USM Blida	Bologhine
16:00	Tatem 37'; Daham 45'; Ouznadji 80'	Soccerway report	Djemaouni 83'	Stadium: Omar Hamadi Stadium; Referee: Kadda Babrahim

6 November 2010 Round 7	USM Blida	0–1	CR Belouizdad	Blida
14:30		Soccerway report	Rebih 42'	Stadium: Stade Mustapha Tchaker; Referee: Farid Bahloul

12 November 2010 Round 8	WA Tlemcen	0–0	USM Blida	Tlemcen
17:00		Soccerway report		Stadium: Stade Akid Lotfi; Referee: Mehdi Abid Charef

27 November 2010 Round 9	USM Blida	1–0	JSM Béjaïa	Blida
14:30	Harizi 27' (pen.)	Soccerway report		Stadium: Stade Mustapha Tchaker; Referee: Mohamed Bichari

3 December 2010 Round 10	USM El Harrach	2–0	USM Blida	Algiers
14:00	Boualem 5'; Benabderahmane 75'	Soccerway report		Stadium: Stade 1er Novembre 1954; Referee: Farouk Mial

11 December 2010 Round 11	USM Blida	1–0	MC Saïda	Blida
14:30	Mokhtar 39'	Soccerway report		Stadium: Stade Mustapha Tchaker; Referee: Mokhtar Amalou

18 December 2010 Round 12	USM Blida	1–0	JS Kabylie	Blida
14:30	Mokhtar 6'	Soccerway report		Stadium: Mustapha Tchaker Stadium; Referee: Mohamed Bouhenni

24 December 2010 Round 13	MC El Eulma	1–0	USM Blida	El Eulma
15:00	Mehia 20'	Soccerway report		Stadium: Stade Messaoud Zougar; Referee: Djamel Haimoudi

8 March 2010 Round 14	USM Blida	1–0	MC Alger	Blida
14:30	Djemaouni 61'	Soccerway report		Stadium: Stade Mustapha Tchaker; Referee: Rafik Achouri

26 February 2011 Round 15	AS Khroub	1–0	USM Blida	El Khroub
13:30	Bellagra 25' (pen.)	Soccerway report		Stadium: Stade Abed Hamdani; Referee: Redouane Necib

19 March 2011 Round 16	MC Oran	1–1	USM Blida	Oran
14:30	Aouedj 33' (pen.)	Soccerway report	Rouag 54'	Stadium: Ahmed Zabana Stadium; Referee: Ali Bouali

29 March 2011 Round 17	USM Blida	1–2	CA Bordj Bou Arreridj	Blida
14:30	Harizi 66'	Soccerway report	Zemmouchi 5' (o.g.); Benchaïra 70'	Stadium: Stade Mustapha Tchaker; Referee: Djamel Haimoudi

1 April 2011 Round 18	ASO Chlef	2–0	USM Blida	Chlef
19:00	Seguer 48'; Soudani 67'	Soccerway report		Stadium: Stade Mohamed Boumezrag; Referee: Mokhtar Amalou

15 April 2011 Round 19	USM Blida	1–0	USM Annaba	Blida
16:00	Djemaouni 45'	Soccerway report		Stadium: Stade Mustapha Tchaker; Referee: Mohamed Bouhenni

25 April 2011 Round 20	ES Sétif	2–2	USM Blida	Sétif
19:00	Koffi 11'; Metref 89'	Soccerway report	Harizi 36', 40' (pen.)	Stadium: Stade 8 Mai 1945; Referee: Mohamed Sahraoui

7 May 2011 Round 21	USM Blida	0–1	USM Alger	Chlef
16:00		Soccerway report	Daham 49'	Stadium: Stade Mohamed Boumezrag; Referee: Mehdi Abid Charef

13 May 2011 Round 22	CR Belouizdad	1–0	USM Blida	Belouizdad
17:00	Rebih 66'	Soccerway report		Stadium: Stade 20 Août 1955; Referee: Rafik Achouri

21 May 2011 Round 23	USM Blida	1–0	WA Tlemcen	Blida
16:00	Belkheir 50'	Soccerway report		Stadium: Stade Mustapha Tchaker; Referee: Mohamed Haddada

27 May 2011 Round 24	JSM Béjaïa	1–0	USM Blida	Béjaïa
20:00	N'Djeng 69'	Soccerway report		Stadium: Stade de l'Unité Maghrébine; Referee: Farouk Houasnia

31 May 2011 Round 25	USM Blida	0–0	USM El Harrach	Blida
16:00		Soccerway report		Stadium: Stade Mustapha Tchaker; Referee: Mohamed Benouza

11 June 2011 Round 26	MC Saïda	3–2	USM Blida	Saida
18:00	Akkouche 43'; Zaoui 48'; Nehari 85'	Soccerway report	Touahri 67'; Harizi 88'	Stadium: April 13, 1958 Stadium; Referee: Rafik Achouri

25 June 2011 Round 27	JS Kabylie	0–1	USM Blida	Tizi Ouzou
18:00		Soccerway report	Belkheir 69'	Stadium: Stade 1er Novembre 1954; Referee: Mehdi Abid Charef

28 June 2011 Round 28	USM Blida	1–1	MC El Eulma	Blida
18:00	Defnoun 14'	Soccerway report	Karaoui 69' (pen.)	Stadium: Stade Mustapha Tchaker; Referee: Mohamed Amine Ghorbal

1 July 2011 Round 29	MC Alger	1–0	USM Blida	Bologhine
18:00	Boudebouda 22' (pen.)	Soccerway report		Stadium: Omar Hammadi Stadium; Referee: Mohamed Benouza

8 July 2011 Round 30	USM Blida	0–1	AS Khroub	Blida
17:00		Soccerway report	Belaïli 87'	Stadium: Stade Mustapha Tchaker; Referee: Bouaza Chenane

== Algerian Cup ==
31 December 2010 Round of 64	USM Blida	5–0	RUDS Batna	Blida
14:15	Bentayeb 31', 66', 74'; Bitam 45'; Bendjillali 80'	Report		Stadium: Stade Mustapha Tchaker
Note: Lineup for USM Blida - Khelladi - Belkhethir, Zemmouchi, Defnoun, Kherbache - Meguenni, Belloucif (Naamani 60), Aliouane, Bitam (Hamia 72’) - Belkheir (Bendjillali 57’), Bentayeb

5 March 2011 Round of 32	JSM Béjaïa	2–0	USM Blida	Béjaïa
15:00	Zerdab 15'; Keddour 82'	Report		Stadium: Stade de l'Unité Maghrébine
Note: Lineup for USM Blida - Gaouaoui - Belkhethir, Zemmouchi, Defnoun, Kherbache (Belkheir 71’) - Harizi, Bennemra (Djemaoune 60’), Aliouane (Tilbi 23’), Belloucif, Illoul - Rouag.

== Squad information ==
=== Playing statistics ===
No.	Pos	Nat	Player	Total		Ligue 1		Algerian Cup	
No.	Pos	Nat	Player	Apps	Goals	Apps	Goals	Apps	Goals
Goalkeepers
1	GK	(Algeria) ALG	Lounès Gaouaoui	26	0	26	0	0	0
26	GK	(Algeria) ALG	Khaled Boukacem	4	0	4	0	0	0
Defenders
18	DF	(Algeria) ALG	Mohamed Mehdi Defnoun	24	1	24	1	0	0
4	DF	(Algeria) ALG	Abderaouf Zemmouchi	25	0	25	0	0	0
15	DF	(Algeria) ALG	Abdellah Chebira	19	0	19	0	0	0
20	DF	(Algeria) ALG	Nasreddine Oussaad	5	0	5	0	0	0
	DF	(Algeria) ALG	Lounis Lanseur	5	0	5	0	0	0
	DF	(Algeria) ALG	Touhami Sebie	7	0	7	0	0	0
2	DF	(Algeria) ALG	Mohamed Yaghni	18	0	18	0	0	0
	DF	(Algeria) ALG	Mokhtar Belkhiter	24	0	24	0	0	0
21	DF	(Algeria) ALG	Mohamed Namani	6	0	6	0	0	0
	DF	(Algeria) ALG	Mohamed Dardhib	2	0	2	0	0	0
Midfielders
10	MF	(Algeria) ALG	Abdelmalek Bitam	11	0	11	0	0	0
5	MF	(Algeria) ALG	Abdelkader Harizi	28	5	28	5	0	0
8	MF	(Algeria) ALG	Hamza Aliouane	7	0	7	0	0	0
	MF	(Algeria) ALG	Slimane Illoul	12	0	12	0	0	0
	MF	(Algeria) ALG	Nacer Bennemra	6	0	6	0	0	0
13	MF	(Algeria) ALG	Nadir Benloucif	23	0	23	0	0	0
27	MF	(Algeria) ALG	Yanis Youssef	8	0	8	0	0	0
32	MF	(Algeria) ALG	Abdelkrim Meguenni	7	0	7	0	0	0
6	MF	(Algeria) ALG	Kadour Beldjilali	6	0	6	0	0	0
	MF	(Algeria) ALG	Mohamed El Amine Hammia	7	0	7	0	0	0
	MF	(Algeria) ALG	Mohamed Amine Khiter	8	0	8	0	0	0
	MF	(Algeria) ALG	Hichem Khalfallah	1	0	1	0	0	0
Forwards
37	FW	(Algeria) ALG	Malik Rouag	11	1	11	1	0	0
23	FW	(Algeria) ALG	Hacene Tilbi	8	0	8	0	0	0
9	FW	(Algeria) ALG	Samir Bentayeb	11	0	11	0	0	0
3	FW	(Algeria) ALG	Abdenour Belkheir	24	2	24	2	0	0
7	FW	(Algeria) ALG	Antar Djemaouni	26	4	26	4	0	0
14	FW	(Algeria) ALG	Abdelouahab Djahel	4	0	4	0	0	0
39	FW	(Algeria) ALG	Hichem Mokhtar	24	2	24	2	0	0
11	FW	(Algeria) ALG	Abdelmoumen Kherbache	9	0	9	0	0	0
	FW	(Algeria) ALG	Hamza Islam Touahri	5	1	5	1	0	0
Players transferred out during the season

Last updated: 13 June 2018
Source: fr.soccerway.com

== Transfers ==
=== In ===
Date	Pos	Player	From club	Transfer fee	Source
1 July 2010	DF	(Algeria) Mohamed Namani	OMR El Annasser	Undisclosed	
1 July 2010	FW	(Algeria) Abdelmoumen Kherbache	NARB Réghaïa	Undisclosed	
1 July 2010	DF	(Algeria) Mokhtar Belkhiter	MC Oran	Undisclosed	
1 July 2010	DF	(Algeria) Mohamed Yaghni	OM Arzew	Undisclosed	
1 July 2010	MF	(Algeria) Abdelkrim Meguenni	MO Constantine	Undisclosed	
1 July 2010	MF	(Algeria) Nacer Bennemra	(France) FC Gueugnon	Undisclosed	
1 July 2010	MF	(Algeria) Abdelmalek Bitam	USM El Harrach	Undisclosed	
1 July 2010	MF	(Algeria) Kaddour Beldjilali	MC Oran	Undisclosed	
1 July 2010	FW	(Algeria) Abdenour Belkheir	MC Alger	Undisclosed	
1 July 2010	FW	(Algeria) Hichem Mokhtar	RC Relizane	Undisclosed	
21 July 2010	GK	(Algeria) Lounès Gaouaoui	ASO Chlef	Undisclosed	
26 August 2010	MF	(Algeria) Yanis Youssef	(Spain) Gimnàstic de Tarragona B	Undisclosed	
1 January 2011	FW	(Algeria) Samir Bentayeb	USM El Harrach	Undisclosed	
1 January 2011	FW	(Algeria) Malik Rouag	(France) US Albi	Undisclosed	
1 January 2011	FW	(Algeria) Slimane Illoul	CA Batna	Undisclosed	
1 January 2011	DF	(Algeria) Lounis Lanseur	(France) FC Libourne	Undisclosed	
