= 2020 Persib Bandung season =

Indonesian football club season

Persib Bandung
2020 season
- Owner: PT. Persib Bandung Bermartabat
- CEO: Glenn Sugita
- Head coach: Robert Alberts
- Stadium: Si Jalak Harupat Stadium
- Liga 1: Did not finish
- Piala Indonesia: Cancelled
- Top goalscorer: Wander Luiz (4)
- Highest home attendance: 26,677 vs. PSS; 15 March 2020
- Lowest home attendance: 25,250 vs. Persela; 1 March 2020
- Average home league attendance: 25,964
- Biggest win: 3–0 vs. Persela (H); 1 March 2020
Home colours	Away colours	Third colours

The 2020 season was the 61st season in the history of Persib Bandung, and the club's 24th consecutive season in the top-flight of Indonesian football since it became fully professional.

== Review ==
=== Background ===
The 2019 season started with Miljan Radović at the helm, taking over from Mario Gomez who was sacked on 12 December 2018. Radović would lead the club throughout the resumed rounds of Piala Indonesia reaching the quarter-finals before his spell ended on 3 May due to an inability to get a sabbatical leave in pursuing a UEFA Pro License, Robert Alberts was appointed in his place. Under the leadership of Alberts, the club finished the 2019 Liga 1 in sixth place on 51 points.

The season was the last to feature midfielder Hariono who leaves the club after 11 seasons in Bandung. He would join Bali United for the 2020 season. Also departing at the end of their contracts were Kevin van Kippersluis, Billy Keraf, and Muchlis Hadi. Van Kippersluis would return to Europe with Spanish club Badajoz, Billy Keraf would join Kalteng Putra in March, while Muchlis Hadi entered into a career break that would last for almost five years before joining Nganjuk Ladang.

=== January ===
Persib began its transfer activities with the return of veteran defender Victor Igbonefo after spending one season with PTT Rayong in Thailand. Dealings continued on 10 January, Persib signed young striker Beni Oktovianto from Persiba Balikpapan. Six days later, the club acquired the services of goalkeeper Teja Paku Alam from Semen Padang. His arrival was followed by fellow goalkeepers Muhammad Natshir and Aqil Savik being sent out on loan to satellite team Bandung United due to exceeding their goalkeeper registration quota.

The club's pre-season programme began on 18 January with the Asia Challenge Cup tournament, starting with 0–3 defeat to hosts Selangor. The next day, they were leading 2–0 over Hanoi at half time before the match was abandoned due to heavy rain. On 21 January, last season's top scorer, Ezechiel N'Douassel left the club to join Bhayangkara for an undisclosed fee with a clause in his contract prohibiting him from playing against Persib.

=== February ===
The month began with Persib winning 3–1 against Melaka United in a friendly on 1 February. Three days later on 4 February, Persib announced the return of winger Zulham Zamrun having spent three seasons away from the club. The same day also saw Achmad Jufriyanto secure a season long loan move to Bhayangkara.

On 10 February, Persib completed the signings of two foreign strikers, Wander Luiz and Geoffrey Castillion. The next day, the club won their next friendly against Barito Putera 2–1. The friendly after that was a 2–0 away win against Persis on 15 February. Two days later, they took another 2–0 friendly away win against PSS. Between their matches against Persis and PSS, the club sent four more players on loan to Bandung United on 16 February with Puja Abdillah, Agung Mulyadi, and Wildan Ramdhani returning after playing there for the second half of last season. They were joined this time with defender Indra Mustafa. Persib's pre-season schedule ended with a goalless draw against TIRA-Persikabo at home.

=== March ===
Persib started the season with a 3–0 win over Persela, courtesy of two goals from Wander Luiz and one from Geoffrey Castillion, in the opening day of Liga 1. Wander Luiz would score again in the next match against Arema, scoring from the spot as Persib won 2–1. Maung Bandung kept the momentum going with a 2–1 win over PSS. Wander Luiz and Castillion were once again on the scoresheet as Persib were on top of the league before it was suspended due to the COVID-19 pandemic.

=== Later developments ===
In preparation for a possible resumption of the season, Persib restarted their squad training program in August. Four youth players were promoted to the first team during these sessions, they were Kakang Rudianto, Saiful, Ardi Maulana, and Ravil Shandyka. A friendly match against TIRA-Persikabo was arranged on 5 September. In the match, Gian Zola was sent off following a second yellow card as both sides played out another goalless friendly draw. On 28 October, Persib signed free agent defender Bayu Fiqri who last played for Semeru in 2019. A rearranged schedule was published for the return of Liga 1 but eventually on 15 January 2021, the season was officially declared void with focus shifting towards starting the next season.

== Squad information ==
Note: Age and contract details are as of 31 December 2020

No.	Name	Nat.	Date of birth (age)	Height	Signed from	Year signed	Contract ends	Ref.
Goalkeepers
14	Teja Paku Alam	(Indonesia)	14 September 1994 (age 26)	1.77 m	(Indonesia) Semen Padang	2020	2021+1	
29	Dhika Bayangkara	(Indonesia)	29 April 1992 (age 28)	1.80 m	(Indonesia) PSS	2019	2020	
78	I Made Wirawan (vice-captain)	(Indonesia)	1 December 1981 (age 39)	1.80 m	(Indonesia) Persiba	2012	2020	
Defenders
2	Nick Kuipers	(Netherlands)	8 October 1992 (age 28)	1.93 m	(Netherlands) ADO Den Haag	2019	2020	
3	Ardi Idrus	(Indonesia)	22 January 1993 (age 27)	1.65 m	(Indonesia) PSS	2018	2020	
4	Bayu Fiqri	(Indonesia)	10 August 2001 (age 19)	1.76 m	Free agent	2020	2023	
5	Kakang Rudianto	(Indonesia)	2 February 2003 (age 17)	1.85 m	Youth academy	2020	2021	
12	Henhen Herdiana	(Indonesia)	10 September 1995 (age 25)	1.69 m	Youth academy	2017	2021	
15	Fabiano Beltrame	(Indonesia)	29 August 1982 (age 38)	1.84 m	(Indonesia) Madura United	2019	2021	
22	Supardi Nasir (captain)	(Indonesia)	9 April 1983 (age 37)	1.73 m	(Indonesia) Sriwijaya	2017	2021	
32	Victor Igbonefo	(Indonesia)	10 October 1985 (age 35)	1.83 m	(Thailand) PTT Rayong	2020	2021+1	
27	Zalnando	(Indonesia)	25 December 1996 (age 24)	1.76 m	(Indonesia) Sriwijaya	2019	2021	
66	Mario Jardel	(Indonesia)	7 November 2000 (age 20)	1.65 m	Youth academy	2018	2021	
Midfielders
6	Saiful	(Indonesia)	9 September 2002 (age 18)	1.65 m	Youth academy	2020	2021	
7	Beckham Putra	(Indonesia)	29 October 2001 (age 19)	1.64 m	Youth academy	2018	2021	
8	Abdul Aziz	(Indonesia)	14 February 1994 (age 26)	1.72 m	(Indonesia) PSMS	2019	2020	
10	Esteban Vizcarra	(Indonesia)	11 April 1986 (age 34)	1.75 m	(Indonesia) Sriwijaya	2019	2021	
11	Dedi Kusnandar	(Indonesia)	23 July 1991 (age 29)	1.75 m	(Malaysia) Sabah	2017	2021	
13	Febri Hariyadi	(Indonesia)	19 February 1996 (age 24)	1.68 m	Youth academy	2015	2021	
16	Ardi Maulana	(Indonesia)	25 February 2001 (age 19)	1.70 m	Youth academy	2020	2021	
18	Gian Zola	(Indonesia)	5 August 1998 (age 22)	1.65 m	Youth academy	2015	2022	
23	Kim Kurniawan	(Indonesia)	23 March 1990 (age 30)	1.68 m	(Indonesia) Pelita Bandung Raya	2016	2021	
77	Ghozali Siregar	(Indonesia)	7 July 1992 (age 28)	1.60 m	(Indonesia) PSM	2018	2020	
91	Omid Nazari	(Philippines)	29 April 1991 (age 29)	1.84 m	(Philippines) Ceres-Negros	2019	2020	
93	Erwin Ramdani	(Indonesia)	3 November 1993 (age 27)	1.69 m	(Indonesia) PSMS	2019	2020	
Forwards
9	Wander Luiz	(Brazil)	17 February 1992 (age 28)	1.88 m	(Vietnam) Becamex Binh Duong	2020	2020+1	
17	Zulham Zamrun	(Indonesia)	19 February 1988 (age 32)	1.72 m	(Indonesia) PSM	2020	2021	
19	Ravil Shandyka	(Indonesia)	14 January 2002 (age 18)	1.65 m	Youth academy	2020	2021	
21	Frets Butuan	(Indonesia)	4 June 1996 (age 24)	1.67 m	(Indonesia) PSMS	2019	2021+1	
20	Geoffrey Castillion	(Netherlands)	25 May 1991 (age 29)	1.91 m	(Iceland) FH	2020	2020+1	
82	Beni Oktovianto	(Indonesia)	23 October 1998 (age 22)	1.73 m	(Indonesia) Persiba	2020	2020+1	
Out on loan
1	Muhammad Natshir	(Indonesia)	13 February 1993 (age 27)	1.82 m	(Indonesia) Arema Cronus	2014	2020	
30	Aqil Savik	(Indonesia)	17 January 1999 (age 21)	1.85 m	Youth academy	2018	2020	
98	Wildan Ramdhani	(Indonesia)	24 December 1998 (age 22)	1.70 m	Youth academy	2018	2021	
–	Achmad Jufriyanto	(Indonesia)	7 February 1987 (age 33)	1.80 m	(Malaysia) Kuala Lumpur	2019	2020	
–	Agung Mulyadi	(Indonesia)	23 March 1997 (age 23)	1.74 m	Youth academy	2017	2020	
–	Indra Mustafa	(Indonesia)	28 June 1999 (age 21)	1.73 m	Youth academy	2018	2021	
–	Puja Abdillah	(Indonesia)	27 November 1996 (age 24)	1.70 m	Youth academy	2017	2020	

== Coaching staff ==
Position	Staff
Head coach	(Netherlands) Robert Alberts
Assistant coach	(Indonesia) Budiman Yunus
Goalkeeping coach	(Brazil) Luizinho Passos
Fitness coach	(Indonesia) Yaya Sunarya
Club doctors	(Indonesia) Mohammad Raffi Ghani (Indonesia) Alvin Wiharja
Physiotherapist	(Indonesia) Benidektus Adi Prianto
Masseurs	(Indonesia) Iyang Mulyana (Indonesia) Tatang Sutisna
Kitmen	(Indonesia) Fikri Apriansyah (Indonesia) Zulkarnaen
Video analyst	(Indonesia) Pandu Satiagraha Effendi

Last updated: 31 December 2020
Source: Liga Indonesia Baru Persib Tempo detik.com Tribunnews.com

== Management and officials ==
Position	Staff
Club manager	(Indonesia) Umuh Muchtar
Club secretary	(Indonesia) Irfan Suryadireja
Media officer	(Indonesia) Muhammad Jatnika Sadili

Last updated: 31 December 2020
Source: Liga Indonesia Baru

== Transfers ==
=== Transfers in ===
Date	Pos.	Name	From	Fee	Ref.
1 January 2020	DF	(Indonesia) Victor Igbonefo	(Thailand) PTT Rayong	Free transfer	
10 January 2020	FW	(Indonesia) Beni Oktovianto	(Indonesia) Persiba	Free transfer	
16 January 2020	GK	(Indonesia) Teja Paku Alam	(Indonesia) Semen Padang	Free transfer	
4 February 2020	FW	(Indonesia) Zulham Zamrun	(Indonesia) PSM	Free transfer	
10 February 2020	FW	(Brazil) Wander Luiz	(Vietnam) Becamex Bình Dương	Free transfer	
10 February 2020	FW	(Netherlands) Geoffrey Castillion	(Iceland) FH	Free transfer	
28 October 2020	DF	(Indonesia) Bayu Fiqri	Free agent (Note: Previous club: Semeru)	Free transfer	

=== Transfers out ===
Date	Pos.	Name	To	Fee	Ref.
1 January 2020	FW	(Indonesia) Muchlis Hadi	Released		
1 January 2020	MF	(Indonesia) Hariono	(Indonesia) Bali United (Note: Agreed on 28 December 2019.)	Free transfer	
1 January 2020	FW	(Netherlands) Kevin van Kippersluis	(Spain) Badajoz (Note: Joined on 20 January 2020.)	Free transfer	
21 January 2020	MF	(Chad) Ezechiel N'Douassel	(Indonesia) Bhayangkara	Undisclosed	
12 March 2020	DF	(Indonesia) Billy Keraf	(Indonesia) Kalteng Putra	Free transfer	

=== Loans out ===
Start date	Pos.	Name	From	End date	Ref.
1 January 2020	GK	(Indonesia) Muhammad Natshir	(Indonesia) Bandung United	End of season	
1 January 2020	GK	(Indonesia) Aqil Savik	(Indonesia) Bandung United	End of season	
4 February 2020	DF	(Indonesia) Achmad Jufriyanto	(Indonesia) Bhayangkara	End of season	
16 February 2020	DF	(Indonesia) Indra Mustafa	(Indonesia) Bandung United	End of season	
16 February 2020	FW	(Indonesia) Wildan Ramdhani	(Indonesia) Bandung United	End of season	
16 February 2020	DF	(Indonesia) Puja Abdillah	(Indonesia) Bandung United	End of season	
16 February 2020	MF	(Indonesia) Agung Mulyadi	(Indonesia) Bandung United	End of season	

== Pre-season and friendlies ==
Win Draw Lose

=== Asia Challenge Cup ===
18 January 2020	Selangor	3–0	Persib	Selangor, Malaysia
18:20 UTC+8	Regan 10'; Syazwan (yellow card) 33'; Sandro 41'; Syahmi 45'	Report	Zalnando (yellow card) 19'	Stadium: Shah Alam Stadium

19 January 2020	Persib	2–0	Hanoi	Selangor, Malaysia
15:50 UTC+8	Puja 19'; Beni 39'	Report		Stadium: Shah Alam Stadium; Attendance: 8,792
Note: Match abandoned after 45 minutes due to heavy rain

=== Friendlies ===
1 February 2020	Persib	3–1	Melaka United	Soreang, Bandung, West Java
16:00 UTC+7	Dedi (yellow card) 20'; Castillion 31', 53'; Idrus (yellow card) 55'; Igbonefo (yellow card) 90'; Ghozali 90+2'	Report	Jang Suk-won 63'; Nurridzuan (yellow card) 40'; Saiful (yellow card) 53'	Stadium: Si Jalak Harupat Stadium; Referee: Thoriq Alkatiri

11 February 2020	Persib	2–1	Barito Putera	Soreang, Bandung, West Java
18:30 UTC+7	Vizcarra 64', 66', (yellow card) 78'	Report	Rakić 77'	Stadium: Si Jalak Harupat Stadium; Attendance: 4,275; Referee: Anas Priliandi

15 February 2020	Persis	0–2	Persib	Surakarta, Central Java
20:30 UTC+7	Casimir (yellow card) 49'; Sobrina (yellow card) 75'	Report	Beckham 11'; Zulham 17' (pen.); Castillion (yellow card) 86'	Stadium: Manahan Stadium

17 February 2020	PSS	0–2	Persib	Bantul, Special Region of Yogyakarta
15:30 UTC+7	Wahyu (yellow card) 43'; Alfonso (yellow card) 44'	Report	Igbonefo 21', (yellow card) 45+1'; Dedi (yellow card) 38'; Wander Luiz 45' (pen.); Frets (yellow card) 56'	Stadium: Sultan Agung Stadium

21 February 2020	Persib	0–0	TIRA-Persikabo	Bandung, West Java
15:30 UTC+7	Nazari (yellow card); Castillion (yellow card)	Report		Stadium: Gelora Bandung Lautan Api Stadium; Attendance: 0 Referee: Pahala Ridwan

5 September 2020	Persib	0–0	TIRA-Persikabo	Bandung, West Java
15:30 UTC+7	Zola (yellow card) 42' (yellow-red card) 50'; Idrus (yellow card) 66'	Report	Bonai (yellow card) 24'; Alex (yellow card) 88'	Stadium: Gelora Bandung Lautan Api Stadium; Attendance: 0 Referee: Yudi Nurcahya

== Competitions ==
=== Overview ===
Competition	Record							
Competition	P	W	D	L	GF	GA	GD	Win%
Liga 1	3	3	0	0	7	2	+5	100.00
Total	3	3	0	0	7	2	+5	100.00

Last updated: 6 August 2020.
Source: persib.co.id

=== Liga 1 ===
==== Standings ====
Pos	Team	Pld	W	D	L	GF	GA	GD	Pts	Qualification or relegation
1	Persib	3	3	0	0	7	2	+5	9	
2	Bali United	3	2	1	0	5	2	+3	7	Qualification for the 2021 AFC Cup group stage (Note: Bali United qualified for the 2021 AFC Cup group stage as the 2019 Liga 1 champions.)
3	Borneo	3	2	0	1	6	4	+2	6	
4	Persipura	3	2	0	1	6	5	+1	6	Qualification for the 2021 AFC Cup play-off round (Note: Persipura qualified for the 2021 AFC Cup play-off round as the 2019 Liga 1 third place.)
5	PSIS	3	2	0	1	5	4	+1	6	

Source: Shopee Liga 1 2020, Soccerway
Rules for classification: 1) Points; 2) Head-to-head; 3) Goal difference; 4) Goals scored; 5) Drawing.

==== Results summary ====
Overall								Home						Away					
Pld	W	D	L	GF	GA	GD	Pts	W	D	L	GF	GA	GD	W	D	L	GF	GA	GD
3	3	0	0	7	2	+5	9	2	0	0	5	1	+4	1	0	0	2	1	+1

Last updated: 15 March 2020.
Source: Soccerway

==== Results by matchday ====
Matchday	1	2	3	4	5	6	7	8	9	10	11	12	13	14	15	16	17	18	19	20	21	22	23	24	25	26	27	28	29	30	31	32	33	34
Ground	H	A	H	A	A	H	H	A	H	A	A	H	H	H	A	H	A	A	H	A	A	H	H	A	H	A	H	H	A	A	A	H	A	H
Result	W	W	W																															
Position	2	1	1																															

Updated to match(es) played on 15 March 2020. Source: Matches
A = Away; H = Home; W = Win; D = Draw; L = Loss

==== Matches ====
1 March 2020 1	Persib	3–0	Persela	Soreang, Bandung, West Java
18:25 UTC+7	Kuipers (yellow card) 20'; Idrus (yellow card) 32'; Castillion 38'; Wander Luiz 54', 69'	Report	Heru (yellow card) 51'	Stadium: Si Jalak Harupat Stadium; Attendance: 25,250; Referee: Agus Fauzan Arifin

8 March 2020 2	Arema	1–2	Persib	Malang, East Java
15:30 UTC+7	Oh In-kyun (yellow card) 21'; Alderete 45' (pen.); Hendro (yellow card) 51'; Feby (yellow card) 52'; Syaiful (yellow card) 75'; Bauman (yellow card) 82'	Report	Kurniawan (yellow card) 22'; Igbonefo (yellow card) 26'; Syaiful 41' (o.g.); Supardi (yellow card) 48'; Wander Luiz 77' (pen.)	Stadium: Kanjuruhan Stadium; Attendance: 23,781; Referee: Aprisman Aranda

15 March 2020 3	Persib	2–1	PSS	Soreang, Bandung, West Java
18:30 UTC+7	Castillion 20', (yellow card) 78'; Wander Luiz (yellow card) 27', (goal) 36'; Supardi (yellow card) 87'	Report	Evans 2'; Bagus (yellow card) 7'	Stadium: Si Jalak Harupat Stadium; Attendance: 26,677; Referee: Yeni Krisdianto

4 October 2020 4	Madura United	Cancelled	Persib	Sidoarjo, East Java
20:30 UTC+7				Stadium: Gelora Delta Stadium; Attendance: 0

10 October 2020 5	Barito Putera	Cancelled	Persib	Sleman, Special Region of Yogyakarta
20:30 UTC+7				Stadium: Maguwoharjo Stadium; Attendance: 0

14 October 2020 6	Persib	Cancelled	Persita	Bandung, West Java
18:15 UTC+7				Stadium: Gelora Bandung Lautan Api Stadium; Attendance: 0

20 October 2020 7	Persib	Cancelled	Bali United	Bandung, West Java
18:30 UTC+7				Stadium: Gelora Bandung Lautan Api Stadium; Attendance: 0

25 October 2020 8	PSM	Cancelled	Persib	Bantul, Special Region of Yogyakarta
18:30 UTC+7				Stadium: Sultan Agung Stadium; Attendance: 0

29 October 2020 9	Persib	Cancelled	TIRA-Persikabo	Bandung, West Java
18:15 UTC+7				Stadium: Gelora Bandung Lautan Api Stadium; Attendance: 0

2 November 2020 10	Persiraja	Cancelled	Persib	Sleman, Special Region of Yogyakarta
18:30 UTC+7				Stadium: Maguwoharjo Stadium; Attendance: 0

7 November 2020 11	PSIS	Cancelled	Persib	Semarang, Central Java
20:30 UTC+7				Stadium: Citarum Stadium; Attendance: 0

11 November 2020 12	Persib	Cancelled	Borneo	Soreang, Bandung, West Java
15:30 UTC+7				Stadium: Si Jalak Harupat Stadium; Attendance: 0

15 November 2020 13	Persib	Cancelled	Persebaya	Soreang, Bandung, West Java
20:30 UTC+7				Stadium: Si Jalak Harupat Stadium; Attendance: 0

19 November 2020 14	Persib	Cancelled	Bhayangkara	Soreang, Bandung, West Java
18:30 UTC+7				Stadium: Si Jalak Harupat Stadium; Attendance: 0

23 November 2020 15	Persik	Cancelled	Persib	Kediri, East Java
18:30 UTC+7				Stadium: Brawijaya Stadium; Attendance: 0

28 November 2020 16	Persib	Cancelled	Persija	Soreang, Bandung, West Java
20:30 UTC+7				Stadium: Si Jalak Harupat Stadium; Attendance: 0

5 December 2020 17	Persipura	Cancelled	Persib	Malang, East Java
20:30 UTC+7				Stadium: Gajayana Stadium; Attendance: 0

10 December 2020 18	Persela	Cancelled	Persib	Lamongan, East Java
18:30 UTC+7				Stadium: Surajaya Stadium; Attendance: 0

15 December 2020 19	Persib	Cancelled	Arema	Soreang, Bandung, West Java
18:15 UTC+7				Stadium: Si Jalak Harupat Stadium; Attendance: 0

20 December 2020 20	PSS	Cancelled	Persib	Sleman, Special Region of Yogyakarta
18:15 UTC+7				Stadium: Maguwoharjo Stadium; Attendance: 0

27 December 2020 21	Persita	Cancelled	Persib	Tangerang, Banten
20:30 UTC+7				Stadium: Benteng Taruna Stadium; Attendance: 0

3 January 2021 22	Persib	Cancelled	Barito Putera	Soreang, Bandung, West Java
20:30 UTC+7				Stadium: Si Jalak Harupat Stadium; Attendance: 0

7 January 2021 23	Persib	Cancelled	Madura United	Soreang, Bandung, West Java
20:30 UTC+7				Stadium: Si Jalak Harupat Stadium; Attendance: 0

11 January 2021 24	Bali United	Cancelled	Persib	Bantul, Special Region of Yogyakarta
16:15 UTC+7				Stadium: Sultan Agung Stadium; Attendance: 0

17 January 2021 25	Persib	Cancelled	PSM	Soreang, Bandung, West Java
18:15 UTC+7				Stadium: Si Jalak Harupat Stadium; Attendance: 0

21 January 2021 26	TIRA-Persikabo	Cancelled	Persib	Cibinong, Bogor, West Java
20:30 UTC+7				Stadium: Pakansari Stadium; Attendance: 0

25 January 2021 27	Persib	Cancelled	Persiraja	Soreang, Bandung, West Java
20:30 UTC+7				Stadium: Si Jalak Harupat Stadium; Attendance: 0

29 January 2021 28	Persib	Cancelled	PSIS	Soreang, Bandung, West Java
20:30 UTC+7				Stadium: Si Jalak Harupat Stadium; Attendance: 0

2 February 2021 29	Borneo	Cancelled	Persib	Sleman, Special Region of Yogyakarta
20:30 UTC+7				Stadium: Maguwoharjo Stadium; Attendance: 0

6 February 2021 30	Persebaya	Cancelled	Persib	Sidoarjo, East Java
20:30 UTC+7				Stadium: Gelora Delta Stadium; Attendance: 0

10 February 2021 31	Bhayangkara	Cancelled	Persib	South Jakarta, DKI Jakarta
18:30 UTC+7				Stadium: PTIK Stadium; Attendance: 0

14 February 2021 32	Persib	Cancelled	Persik	Soreang, Bandung, West Java
18:30 UTC+7				Stadium: Si Jalak Harupat Stadium; Attendance: 0

20 February 2021 33	Persija	Cancelled	Persib	Bantul, Special Region of Yogyakarta
20:30 UTC+7				Stadium: Sultan Agung Stadium; Attendance: 0

28 February 2021 34	Persib	Cancelled	Persipura	Soreang, Bandung, West Java
--:-- UTC+7				Stadium: Si Jalak Harupat Stadium; Attendance: 0

=== Piala Indonesia ===
The tournament was cancelled for 2020 due to the COVID-19 pandemic.

== Squad statistics ==
=== Appearances and goals ===
No.	Pos.	Name	Liga 1		Total	
No.	Pos.	Name	Apps	Goals	Apps	Goals
2	DF	(Netherlands) Nick Kuipers	3	0	3	0
3	DF	(Indonesia) Ardi Idrus	3	0	3	0
7	MF	(Indonesia) Beckham Putra	0 (1)	0	0 (1)	0
8	MF	(Indonesia) Abdul Aziz	0	0	0	0
9	FW	(Brazil) Wander Luiz	3	4	3	4
10	MF	(Indonesia) Esteban Vizcarra	3	0	3	0
11	MF	(Indonesia) Dedi Kusnandar	0 (3)	0	0 (3)	0
12	DF	(Indonesia) Henhen Herdiana	0	0	0	0
13	MF	(Indonesia) Febri Haryadi	2 (1)	0	2 (1)	0
14	GK	(Indonesia) Teja Paku Alam	2	0	2	0
15	DF	(Indonesia) Fabiano Beltrame	0 (1)	0	0 (1)	0
17	FW	(Indonesia) Zulham Zamrun	0 (1)	0	0 (1)	0
18	MF	(Indonesia) Gian Zola	0	0	0	0
20	FW	(Netherlands) Geoffrey Castillion	3	2	3	2
21	MF	(Indonesia) Frets Butuan	1 (2)	0	1 (2)	0
22	DF	(Indonesia) Supardi Nasir	3	0	3	0
23	MF	(Indonesia) Kim Kurniawan	3	0	3	0
27	DF	(Indonesia) Zalnando	0	0	0	0
29	GK	(Indonesia) Dhika Bhayangkara	0	0	0	0
32	DF	(Indonesia) Victor Igbonefo	3	0	3	0
66	DF	(Indonesia) Mario Jardel	0	0	0	0
77	MF	(Indonesia) Ghozali Siregar	0	0	0	0
78	GK	(Indonesia) I Made Wirawan	1	0	1	0
82	FW	(Indonesia) Beni Oktovianto	0	0	0	0
91	MF	(Philippines) Omid Nazari	3	0	3	0
93	MF	(Indonesia) Erwin Ramdani	0	0	0	0

Last updated: 6 August 2020.
Source: persib.co.id

=== Assists ===
Rank	No.	Pos.	Name	Liga 1	Total
1	20	FW	(Netherlands) Geoffrey Castillion	1	1
1	21	MF	(Indonesia) Frets Butuan	1	1
1	9	FW	(Brazil) Wander Luiz	1	1
1	22	DF	(Indonesia) Supardi Nasir	1	1
Total				1	1

Last updated: 6 August 2020.
Source: persib.co.id

=== Goalkeeping statistics ===
No.	Name	Liga 1		Total	
No.	Name	CS	GA	CS	GA
14	(Indonesia) Teja Paku Alam	1	1	1	1
29	(Indonesia) Dhika Bhayangkara	0	0	0	0
78	(Indonesia) I Made Wirawan	0	1	0	1
Total		1	2	1	2

Last updated: 6 August 2020.
Source: persib.co.id

- Notes:

CS – Clean Sheet
GA – Goals Against

=== Disciplinary record ===
No.	Pos.	Name	Liga 1		Total	
No.	Pos.	Name	Yellow card	Red card	Yellow card	Red card
2	DF	(Netherlands) Nick Kuipers	1	0	1	0
3	DF	(Indonesia) Ardi Idrus	1	0	1	0
7	MF	(Indonesia) Beckham Putra	0	0	0	0
8	MF	(Indonesia) Abdul Aziz	0	0	0	0
9	FW	(Brazil) Wander Luiz	1	0	1	0
10	MF	(Indonesia) Esteban Vizcarra	0	0	0	0
11	MF	(Indonesia) Dedi Kusnandar	0	0	0	0
12	DF	(Indonesia) Henhen Herdiana	0	0	0	0
13	MF	(Indonesia) Febri Haryadi	0	0	0	0
14	GK	(Indonesia) Teja Paku Alam	0	0	0	0
15	DF	(Indonesia) Fabiano Beltrame	0	0	0	0
17	FW	(Indonesia) Zulham Zamrun	0	0	0	0
18	MF	(Indonesia) Gian Zola	0	0	0	0
20	FW	(Netherlands) Geoffrey Castillion	1	0	1	0
21	MF	(Indonesia) Frets Butuan	0	0	0	0
22	DF	(Indonesia) Supardi Nasir	2	0	2	0
23	MF	(Indonesia) Kim Kurniawan	1	0	1	0
27	DF	(Indonesia) Zalnando	0	0	0	0
29	GK	(Indonesia) Dhika Bhayangkara	0	0	0	0
32	DF	(Indonesia) Victor Igbonefo	1	0	1	0
66	DF	(Indonesia) Mario Jardel	0	0	0	0
77	MF	(Indonesia) Ghozali Siregar	0	0	0	0
78	GK	(Indonesia) I Made Wirawan	0	0	0	0
82	FW	(Indonesia) Beni Oktovianto	0	0	0	0
91	MF	(Philippines) Omid Nazari	0	0	0	0
93	MF	(Indonesia) Erwin Ramdani	0	0	0	0
Total			8	0	8	0

Last updated: 6 August 2020.
Source: persib.co.id
