= 2009–10 USM Blida season =

USM Blida
2009–10 season
- Chairman: Mohamed Zaïm
- Head coach: Manuel Fernandez (from 6 June 2009) (until 15 August 2009); Kamel Mouassa (from 18 August 2009) (until 14 March 2010); Mokhtar Assas (from 19 March 2010)
- Stadium: Stade Mustapha Tchaker
- National: 14th
- Algerian Cup: Round of 32
- Top goalscorer: League: Ezechiel N'Douassel (7 goals); All: Ezechiel N'Douassel (8 goals)
Home colours	Away colours

In the 2009–10 season, USM Blida is competing in the National for the 25th season, as well as the Algerian Cup. They will be competing in Ligue 1, and the Algerian Cup.

== Squad list ==
Players and squad numbers last updated on 18 November 2009.
Note: Flags indicate national team as has been defined under FIFA eligibility rules. Players may hold more than one non-FIFA nationality.

No.	Nat.	Position	Name	Date of birth (age)	Signed from
Goalkeepers
16	(Algeria)	GK	Mohamed Ghalem	17 October 1977 (aged 32)	(Algeria) RC Kouba
26	(Algeria)	GK	Khaled Boukacem	24 April 1985 (aged 24)	(Algeria) Youth system
Defenders
15	(Algeria)	LB	Abdellah Chebira	12 July 1986 (aged 23)	(Algeria) Youth system
19	(Algeria)	CB	Mohamed Mehdi Defnoun	6 February 1979 (aged 30)	(Algeria) JSM Skikda
4	(Algeria)	CB	Abderaouf Zemmouchi	9 February 1987 (aged 22)	(Algeria) Youth system
5	(Algeria)	CB	Mohamed Belahoual	14 June 1987 (aged 22)	(Algeria) Youth system
3	(Algeria)	CB	Touhami Sebie	3 May 1988 (aged 21)	(Algeria) Youth system
20	(Algeria)	RB	Nasreddine Oussaâd	12 March 1986 (aged 23)	(Algeria) Youth system
17	(Algeria)	RB	Abdelghani Chaouaou	29 December 1983 (aged 26)	(Algeria) CS Constantine
8	(Cameroon)	CB	Hervé Guillaume Boumsong	13 December 1988 (aged 21)	(Cameroon) Canon Yaoundé
Midfielders
10	(Algeria)	AM	Bilel Herbache	4 January 1986 (aged 23)	(Algeria) Youth system
6	(Algeria)	DM	Nadir Benloucif	23 September 1982 (aged 27)	(Algeria) JSM Skikda
	(Algeria)	DM	Amine Kraïmia	6 May 1988 (aged 21)	(Algeria) Youth system
	(Algeria)	DM	Abdelkader Harizi	14 July 1987 (aged 22)	(Algeria) CR Belouizdad
7	(Algeria)	RM	Hamza Guessoum	10 November 1981 (aged 28)	(Algeria) USM El Harrach
	(Algeria)	DM	Mohamed Abdou Solimane	24 January 1990 (aged 19)	(Algeria) Youth system
Forwards
23	(Algeria)		Hacene Tilbi	17 August 1986 (aged 23)	(Algeria) AS Khroub
	(Algeria)		Abdelouahab Djahel	24 April 1985 (aged 24)	Unattached
11	(Algeria)		Mohamed Abed Bahtsou	25 December 1985 (aged 24)	Unattached
2	(Algeria)		Antar Djemaouni	29 August 1987 (aged 22)	(Algeria) Youth system
9	(Algeria)		Hadj Saâd Djilani	24 September 1984 (aged 25)	Unattached
30	(Chad)		Ezechiel N'Douassel	22 April 1988 (aged 21)	(Chad) Tourbillon FC
18	(Algeria)		Sabri Khellaf	18 June 1985 (aged 24)	(Algeria) USM Aïn Beïda
	(Algeria)		Sofiane Louz	22 January 1991 (aged 18)	(Algeria) Youth system
13	(Algeria)		Mansour Boutabout	20 September 1978 (aged 31)	Unattached

== Competitions ==
=== Overview ===
Competition	Record								Started round	Final position / round	First match	Last match
Competition	G	W	D	L	GF	GA	GD	Win %	Started round	Final position / round	First match	Last match
National	34	11	10	13	30	33	−3	32.35	—N/a	14th	6 August 2009	31 May 2010
Algerian Cup	3	1	2	0	6	3	+3	33.33	Round of 64	Round of 16	25 September 2009	16 March 2010
Total	37	12	12	13	36	36	+0	32.43				

Updated to match played 26 March 2020
Source: Competitions

=== National ===
==== League table ====
Pos	Team	Pld	W	D	L	GF	GA	GD	Pts	Qualification or relegation
12	ASO Chlef	34	12	7	15	38	41	−3	43	
13	MC El Eulma	34	11	10	13	33	36	−3	43	
14	USM Blida	34	11	10	13	30	33	−3	43	
15	MC Oran	34	10	11	13	33	42	−9	41	
16	CA Batna (Note: CA Batna also qualified to the 2011 CAF Confederation Cup as cup runner-up.) (R, Q)	34	10	7	17	27	40	−13	37	Relegation to Championnat National 2

Source: Soccerways FIFA.com
Rules for classification: 1) points; 2) goal difference; 3) number of goals scored.
(Q) Qualified for the phase indicated; (R) Relegated

=== Results summary ===
Overall								Home						Away					
Pld	W	D	L	GF	GA	GD	Pts	W	D	L	GF	GA	GD	W	D	L	GF	GA	GD
34	11	10	13	30	33	−3	43	8	7	2	17	10	+7	3	3	11	13	23	−10

Last updated: 29 December 2014.
Source: Competitive matches

=== Results by round ===
Round	1	2	3	4	5	6	7	8	9	10	11	12	13	14	15	16	17	18	19	20	21	22	23	24	25	26	27	28	29	30	31	32	33	34
Ground	A	H	A	H	A	H	A	A	A	H	A	H	A	A	H	A	H	H	A	H	A	H	A	H	H	H	A	H	A	H	H	A	H	A
Result	L	W	L	W	W	L	D	L	L	W	L	D	D	L	D	L	D	D	L	D	D	L	L	D	W	D	W	W	W	W	W	L	W	L
Position	14	10	14	8	5	7	9	11	13	10	14	14	15	15	16	16	15	15	16	16	16	16	16	16	16	16	16	15	14	12	12	12	11	12

Source: Competitive matches
A = Away; H = Home; W = Win; D = Draw; L = Loss

=== Matches ===
Win Draw Loss

6 August 2009 Round 1	NA Hussein Dey	2–0	USM Blida	Algiers
17:00	Chehloul 7'; Boussefiane 45'	Soccerway report		Stadium: Stade Frères Zioui; Referee: Said Douala

14 August 2009 Round 2	USM Blida	1–0	AS Khroub	Blida
19:00	Guessoum 34'	Soccerway report		Stadium: Stade Mustapha Tchaker; Referee: Mohamed Bouhenni

22 August 2009 Round 3	MC Alger	1–0	USM Blida	Rouiba
22:00	Babouche 26' (pen.)	Soccerway report		Stadium: Stade Mabrouki Salem; Attendance: 0 (close doors); Referee: Mohamed Bouali

29 August 2009 Round 4	USM Blida	1–0	CA Batna	Blida
23:00	Chebira 72'	Soccerway report		Stadium: Stade Mustapha Tchaker; Referee: Mohamed Benouza

11 September 2009 Round 5	JSM Béjaïa	2–3	USM Blida	Bouïra
23:00	Belkheïr 25'; El Hadi 86'	Soccerway report	Djemaouni 29', 35', 63'	Stadium: Stade Rabah Bitat; Referee: Redouane Necib

13 October 2009 Round 6	USM Blida	1–2	ES Sétif	Blida
23:00	Djilani 69'	Soccerway report	Hemani 35', 77'	Stadium: Stade Mustapha Tchaker; Attendance: 0 (close doors); Referee: Mohamed Bouhenni

29 September 2009 Round 7	WA Tlemcen	1–1	USM Blida	Tlemcen
17:00	Bachiri 12'	Soccerway report	Defnoun 89'	Stadium: Stade Akid Lotfi; Referee: Farouk Houasnia

3 October 2009 Round 8	MC Oran	1–0	USM Blida	Oran
17:00	Sebbah 65'	Soccerway report		Stadium: Stade Ahmed Zabana; Referee: Mehdi Abid Charef

16 October 2009 Round 9	CR Belouizdad	1–0	USM Blida	Belouizdad
20:00	Younès 39' (pen.)	Soccerway report		Stadium: Stade 20 Août 1955; Referee: Mohamed Bouali

23 October 2009 Round 10	USM Blida	1–0	MSP Batna	Blida
20:00	Djemaouni 68'	Soccerway report		Stadium: Stade Mustapha Tchaker; Referee: Mohamed Bichari

31 October 2009 Round 11	USM Alger	1–0	USM Blida	Bologhine
14:30	Dziri 33'	Soccerway report		Stadium: Omar Hamadi Stadium; Referee: Mohamed Haddada

7 November 2009 Round 12	USM Blida	0–0	USM Annaba	Blida
14:30		Soccerway report		Stadium: Stade Mustapha Tchaker; Attendance: 0 (close doors); Referee: Boubekeur Zouaoui

21 November 2009 Round 13	MC El Eulma	0–0	USM Blida	El Eulma
14:30		Soccerway report		Stadium: Stade Messaoud Zougar; Referee: Mehdi Abid Charef

1 December 2009 Round 14	ASO Chlef	2–0	USM Blida	Chlef
18:00	Messaoud 73'; Mohamed Rabah 90+2' (pen.)	Soccerway report		Stadium: Stade Mohamed Boumezrag; Referee: Mustapha Ferradi

5 December 2009 Round 15	USM Blida	1–1	JS Kabylie	Blida
14:30	Djemaouni 21'	Soccerway report	Yahia-Chérif 23'	Stadium: Stade Mustapha Tchaker; Attendance: 0 (close doors); Referee: Mohamed Haddada

11 December 2009 Round 16	CA Bordj Bou Arreridj	1–0	USM Blida	Bordj Bou Arréridj
18:00	Touati 58'	Soccerway report		Stadium: August 20, 1955 Stadium; Referee: Mohamed Benouza

15 December 2009 Round 17	USM Blida	1–1	USM El Harrach	Blida
14:00	Zemmouchi 74'	Soccerway report	Bourakba 54'	Stadium: Stade Mustapha Tchaker; Referee: Mohamed Bouali

16 January 2010 Round 18	USM Blida	0–0	NA Hussein Dey	Blida
14:30		Soccerway report		Stadium: Stade Mustapha Tchaker; Referee: Mohamed Bichari

23 January 2010 Round 19	AS Khroub	3–2	USM Blida	El Khroub
14:30	Mehdaoui 23'; Nait Yahia 87', 90'	Soccerway report	Defnoun 18'; Abed 70'	Stadium: Abed Hamdani Stadium; Referee: Said Benamara

30 January 2010 Round 20	USM Blida	1–1	MC Alger	Blida
14:30	Abed 10'	Soccerway report	Boumechra 90+4' (pen.)	Stadium: Stade Mustapha Tchaker; Referee: Farouk Houasnia

6 February 2010 Round 21	CA Batna	0–0	USM Blida	Batna
14:30		Soccerway report		Stadium: Stade 1er Novembre 1954; Referee: Belkacem Boumaza

13 February 2010 Round 22	USM Blida	0–2	JSM Béjaïa	Blida
14:30		Soccerway report	Zafour 75'; N'Djeng 82'	Stadium: Stade Mustapha Tchaker; Referee: Mohamed Haddada

16 April 2010 Round 23	ES Sétif	2–1	USM Blida	Sétif
18:00	Metref 25' (pen.); Guedider 90+3'	Soccerway report	Harizi 39'	Stadium: Stade 8 Mai 1945; Referee: Redouane Necib

6 March 2010 Round 24	USM Blida	1–1	WA Tlemcen	Blida
14:30	Tilbi 80'	Soccerway report	Djallit 48'	Stadium: Stade Mustapha Tchaker; Referee: Rafik Achouri

20 March 2010 Round 25	USM Blida	2–1	MC Oran	Blida
14:30	N'Douassel 6'; Djahel 27'	Soccerway report	Chaïb 37' (pen.)	Stadium: Stade Mustapha Tchaker; Referee: Said Douala

23 March 2010 Round 26	USM Blida	0–0	CR Belouizdad	Blida
14:30		Soccerway report		Stadium: Stade Mustapha Tchaker; Referee: Boubekeur Zouaoui

6 April 2010 Round 27	MSP Batna	0–2	USM Blida	Batna
15:00		Soccerway report	Belloucif 50'; N'Douassel 90'	Stadium: Stade 1er Novembre 1954; Referee: Mehdi Abid Charef

24 April 2010 Round 28	USM Blida	2–1	USM Alger	Blida
17:00	Ndouassel 10', 40'	Soccerway report	Meklouche 90'	Stadium: Stade Mustapha Tchaker; Referee: Mokhtar Amalou

4 May 2010 Round 29	USM Annaba	1–2	USM Blida	Annaba
18:00	Guemari 72'	Soccerway report	Ndouassel 55'; Harizi 60'	Stadium: Stade 19 Mai 1956; Referee: Rafik Achouri

13 May 2010 Round 30	USM Blida	2–0	MC El Eulma	Blida
18:00	Tilbi 8'; Ndouassel 55'	Soccerway report		Stadium: Stade Mustapha Tchaker; Referee: Farouk Mial

22 May 2010 Round 31	USM Blida	2–0	ASO Chlef	Blida
18:00	Ndouassel 55'; Slimi 87' (o.g.)	Soccerway report		Stadium: Stade Mustapha Tchaker; Referee: Boubekeur Zouaoui

25 May 2010 Round 32	JS Kabylie	3–1	USM Blida	Tizi Ouzou
18:00	Ech-Chergui 21'; Yahia Chérif 52'; Azuka 73'	Soccerway report	Tilbi 12'	Stadium: Stade 1er Novembre 1954; Attendance: 0 (close doors); Referee: Said Douala

28 May 2010 Round 33	USM Blida	1–0	CA Bordj Bou Arreridj	Blida
18:00	Harizi 17'	Soccerway report		Stadium: Stade Mustapha Tchaker; Referee: Abderrazek Hallalchi

31 May 2010 Round 34	USM El Harrach	2–1	USM Blida	El Harrach
18:00	Hanitser 3', 83'	Soccerway report	Herbache 46'	Stadium: November 1, 1954 Stadium; Referee: Abdelkader Karabi

== Algerian Cup ==
25 September 2009 Round of 64	USM Blida	4–1	MB Constantine	Blida
14:30	Oussaâd 12'; Herbache 20' (pen.); Belahouel 47'; Chebira 80'			Stadium: Stade Mustapha Tchaker; Referee: Osmane, Kerraï, Haïmeldi
Note: Lineup for USM Blida - Boukacem, Belahouel, Sebie, Zemouchi, Defnoun, Oussaad, Chebira, Benloucif, Herbache, Tilbi, Djahel.

19 February 2010 Round of 32	USM Blida	2–2 (a.e.t.) (3–2 p)	JSM Béjaïa	Blida
14:30	Zemmouchi (red card) 54'; Abed 61'; Ezechiel 67'; Chebira (yellow card) 90'	Report	Boulemdaïs (yellow card) 13' (goal) 63', 71'	Stadium: Stade Mustapha Tchaker; Referee: Bichari, Benarous, Boudiba
Note: Lineup for USM Blida - Ghalem - Oussad, Zemmouchi, Sbaïhi, Chebira - Abdelouhab (Chaouaou 119’), Harizi, Herbache, Kraïmia - Ndouassel, Djemaouni (Abed 59’) (Beloucif 97’).

16 March 2010 Round of 16	CA Batna	0–0 (a.e.t.) (4–3 p)	USM Blida	Batna
15:00	Ziouar (yellow card) 34'; Ali Daira (yellow card) 36'; Saber Chebana (yellow card) 90+2'		Djahel (yellow card) 40'	Stadium: Stade 1er Novembre 1954; Referee: Benouza, Chabane, Hedia
Note: Lineup for USM Blida - Ghalem - Sebihi, Belahouel, Defnoun, Chebira - Herbache, Belloucif, Djahel (Harizi 106’) - Ndouassel, Abed (Boutabout 81’), Tilbi (Djemouni 66’).

== Squad information ==
=== Playing statistics ===
No.	Pos	Nat	Player	Total		Ligue 1		Algerian Cup	
No.	Pos	Nat	Player	Apps	Goals	Apps	Goals	Apps	Goals
Goalkeepers
	GK	(Algeria) ALG	Mohamed Ghalem	30	0	28	0	2	0
	GK	(Algeria) ALG	Khaled Boukacem	7	0	6	0	1	0
Defenders
	DF	(Algeria) ALG	Abdellah Chebira	32	2	29	1	3	1
	DF	(Algeria) ALG	Mohamed Mehdi Defnoun	28	1	26	1	2	0
	DF	(Algeria) ALG	Abderaouf Zemmouchi	26	1	24	1	2	0
	DF	(Algeria) ALG	Mohamed Belahoual	26	1	24	0	2	1
	DF	(Algeria) ALG	Touhami Sebie	23	0	20	0	3	0
	DF	(Algeria) ALG	Nasreddine Oussaâd	20	1	18	0	2	1
	DF	(Algeria) ALG	Abdelghani Chaouaou	16	0	15	0	1	0
	DF	(Cameroon) CMR	Hervé Guillaume Boumsong	14	0	14	0	0	0
	DF	(Algeria) ALG	Slimane Tayeb	5	0	5	0	0	0
	DF	(Algeria) ALG	Djilali Terbah	1	0	1	0	0	0
	DF	(Algeria) ALG	Abdel Raouf Saoudi	1	0	1	0	0	0
Midfielders
	MF	(Algeria) ALG	Bilel Herbache	33	2	30	1	3	1
	MF	(Algeria) ALG	Nadir Benloucif	22	1	19	1	3	0
	MF	(Algeria) ALG	Amine Kraïmia	20	0	19	0	1	0
	MF	(Algeria) ALG	Abdelkader Harizi	18	3	16	3	2	0
	MF	(Algeria) ALG	Hamza Guessoum	12	1	12	1	0	0
	MF	(Algeria) ALG	Mohamed Abdou Taieb Solimane	9	0	9	0	0	0
	MF	(Algeria) ALG	Nasser Hakkar	1	0	1	0	0	0
	MF	(Algeria) ALG	Walid Saïbi	1	0	1	0	0	0
Forwards
	FW	(Algeria) ALG	Hacene Tilbi	32	3	30	3	2	0
	FW	(Algeria) ALG	Abdelouahab Djahel	30	1	27	1	3	0
	FW	(Algeria) ALG	Mohamed Abed Bahtsou	28	3	26	2	2	1
	FW	(Algeria) ALG	Antar Djemaouni	27	5	25	5	2	0
	FW	(Algeria) ALG	Hadj Saâd Djilani	15	1	15	1	0	0
	FW	(Chad) CHA	Ezechiel N'Douassel	15	8	13	7	2	1
	FW	(Algeria) ALG	Sabri Khellaf	5	1	5	1	0	0
	FW	(Algeria) ALG	Sofiane Louz	4	0	4	0	0	0
	FW	(Algeria) ALG	Mansour Boutabout	4	0	3	0	1	0
	FW	(Algeria) ALG	Hassen Abdelouahab	2	0	2	0	0	0
	FW	(Algeria) ALG	Taimmy Négrèche	1	0	1	0	0	0
Players transferred out during the season

Last updated: 13 June 2018
Source: fr.soccerway.com

== Transfers ==
=== In ===
Date	Pos	Player	To club	Transfer fee	Source
1 July 2009	FW	(Algeria) Mohamed Abed Bahtsou	USM Bel-Abbès	Undisclosed	
1 July 2009	DM	(Algeria) Nadir Benloucif	JSM Skikda	Undisclosed	
1 July 2009	GK	(Algeria) Khaled Boukacem		Undisclosed	
1 July 2009	DF	(Algeria) Abdelghani Chaouaou	CS Constantine	Undisclosed	
1 July 2009	DF	(Algeria) Mohamed Mehdi Defnoun	JSM Skikda	Undisclosed	
1 July 2009	FW	(Algeria) Abdelouahab Djahel		Undisclosed	
1 July 2009	FW	(Algeria) Antar Djemaouni		Undisclosed	
1 July 2009	MF	(Algeria) Hamza Guessoum	USM El Harrach	Undisclosed	
1 July 2009		(Algeria) Sabri Khellaf	USM Aïn Beïda	Undisclosed	
1 July 2009		(Algeria) Amine Kraimia	HB Chelghoum Laïd	Undisclosed	
1 July 2009		(Algeria) Sofiane Louz	CA Batna	Undisclosed	
1 July 2009		(Algeria) Touhami Sebie	CA Bordj Bou Arréridj	Undisclosed	
1 July 2009		(Algeria) Hacene Tilbi	AS Khroub	Undisclosed	
1 January 2010		(Algeria) Abdelkader Harizi	CR Belouizdad	Undisclosed	
1 January 2010		(Algeria) Taïmmy Negrèche	(France) L'Entente SSG	Undisclosed	
23 February 2010		(Algeria) Mansour Boutabout	(Belgium) Courtrai	Undisclosed	

=== Out ===
Date	Pos	Player	To club	Transfer fee	Source
1 June 2009	DF	(Algeria) Benziane Senouci	MC Alger	Undisclosed	
1 June 2009		(Algeria) Nacim Abdelali	(Hungary) Nyiregyhaza Spartacus	Undisclosed	
1 June 2009		(Cameroon) Jean-Philippe Belinga		Undisclosed	
1 June 2009		(Algeria) Hichem Benmeghit	OM Arzew	Undisclosed	
1 June 2009		(Algeria) Farès Hamiti	JS Kabylie	Undisclosed	
1 June 2009		(Algeria) Mohamed Kennouche	ES Guelma	Undisclosed	
1 June 2009		(Algeria) Mohamed Mehdaoui	AS Khroub	Undisclosed	
1 June 2009		(Algeria) Abdelkader Meziane	SA Mohammadia	Undisclosed	
1 June 2009		(Algeria) Houssam Ould Zmirli	RC Kouba	Undisclosed	
1 June 2009		(Algeria) Hamza Ounnas	MO Constantine	Undisclosed	
1 June 2009		(Algeria) Mohamed Saadi	CR Témouchent	Undisclosed	
1 June 2009		(Algeria) Zoubir Zmit	MC Oran	Undisclosed	
1 June 2009		(Algeria) Nasser Hakkar	(France) FC Mulhouse	Undisclosed	
1 June 2009		(Algeria) Hassane Toual	MSP Batna	Undisclosed	
