= 2011–12 MC Oran season =

MC Oran
2011–12 season
- Chairman: Youcef Djebbari
- Head coach: Alain Michel (until 4 August 2011); Said Hadj Mansour (from September 2011) (until 2 October 2011); Mohamed Henkouche (from 18 October 2011) (until 10 November 2011); Tahar Chérif El-Ouazzani (from 12 November 2011) (until 19 November 2011); Mohamed Henkouche (from 20 November 2011) (until 10 March 2012); Raoul Savoy (from 8 March 2012)
- Stadium: Stade Ahmed Zabana
- Ligue 1: 13th
- Algerian Cup: Round of 64
- Top goalscorer: League: Youcef Belaïli (8); Nasereddine El Bahari (8); All: Youcef Belaïli (8); Nasereddine El Bahari (8)
Home colours	Away colours

During the 2011–12 season, MC Oran competed in the 46th season of the Algerian Ligue 1, as well as the Algerian Cup.

== Squad list ==
Players and squad numbers last updated on 18 November 2011.
Note: Flags indicate national team as has been defined under FIFA eligibility rules. Players may hold more than one non-FIFA nationality.

No.	Nat.	Position	Name	Date of birth (age)	Signed from
Goalkeepers
Defenders
Midfielders
Forwards

== Competitions ==
=== Overview ===
Competition	Record								Started round	Final position / round	First match	Last match
Competition	G	W	D	L	GF	GA	GD	Win %	Started round	Final position / round	First match	Last match
Ligue 1	30	9	8	13	38	51	−13	30.00	—N/a	13th	10 September 2011	19 May 2012
Algerian Cup	1	0	0	1	1	2	−1	0.00	Round of 64		30 December 2011	
Total	31	9	8	14	39	53	−14	29.03				

Updated to match played 9 May 2017
Source: Competitions

== League table ==
This table shows finishing positions 11–15 of the 16 teams in the league.

Pos	Team	Pld	W	D	L	GF	GA	GD	Pts	Qualification or relegation
11	MC El Eulma	30	10	8	12	38	39	−1	38	
12	CS Constantine	30	8	12	10	35	42	−7	36	
13	MC Oran	30	9	8	13	38	51	−13	35	
14	AS Khroub (R)	30	7	10	13	23	46	−23	31	Relegation to Ligue Professionnelle 2
15	NA Hussein Dey (R)	30	5	11	14	29	39	−10	26	Relegation to Ligue Professionnelle 2

Updated to match(es) played on 19 April 2018. Source: DZFoot
Rules for classification: 1) points; 2) head-to-head points; 3) head-to-head goal difference; 4) goal difference; 5) total goals; 6) fairplay ranking; 7) playoff.
(R) Relegated

=== Results summary ===
Overall								Home						Away					
Pld	W	D	L	GF	GA	GD	Pts	W	D	L	GF	GA	GD	W	D	L	GF	GA	GD
30	9	8	13	38	51	−13	35	7	3	5	23	20	+3	2	5	8	15	31	−16

Last updated: 29 December 2014.
Source: Competitive matches

=== Results by round ===
Round	1	2	3	4	5	6	7	8	9	10	11	12	13	14	15	16	17	18	19	20	21	22	23	24	25	26	27	28	29	30
Ground	H	A	H	A	H	H	A	H	A	H	A	H	A	H	A	A	H	A	H	A	A	H	A	H	A	H	A	H	A	H
Result	L	D	D	L	L	W	L	L	L	L	D	W	L	D	L	W	W	L	W	L	L	D	D	W	D	W	W	W	D	L
Position	12	13	14	16	16	15	15	15	15	15	15	15	15	15	15	15	14	14	14	14	15	15	15	14	14	14	13	13	13	13

Source: Competitive matches
A = Away; H = Home; W = Win; D = Draw; L = Loss

=== Matches ===
10 September 2011 Round 1	MC Oran	1–2	USM El Harrach	Oran
16:00	Feddal 88'	Report	Touahri 60'; Bounedjah 78'	Stadium: Ahmed Zabana Stadium; Referee: Rafik Achouri

17 September 2011 Round 2	AS Khroub	1–1	MC Oran	El Khroub
19:00	Mesfar 35'	Report	Leghzal 86'	Stadium: Abed Hamdani Stadium; Referee: Mokhtar Amalou

24 September 2011 Round 3	MC Oran	1–1	MC El Eulma	Oran
16:00	Feddal 88'	Report	Bouaïcha 10'	Stadium: Ahmed Zabana Stadium; Referee: Farouk Mial

1 October 2011 Round 4	CR Belouizdad	4–1	MC Oran	Belouizdad
19:00	Abdat 20'; Aksas 33'; Slimani 81'; Bourakba 90+2'	Report	Belaïli 51'	Stadium: Stade 20 Août 1955; Referee: Ramzi Habibatni

15 October 2011 Round 5	MC Oran	1–3	WA Tlemcen	Oran
15:30	Bentiba 88'	Report	Belgherri 12' (pen.); Sameur 67' (pen.); Benmeghit 78'	Stadium: Ahmed Zabana Stadium; Referee: Sofiane Bousseter

22 October 2011 Round 6	MC Oran	2–1	CS Constantine	Oran
16:00	El Bahari 21'; Aouedj 75'	Report	Hadjadj 88'	Stadium: Ahmed Zabana Stadium; Referee: Mohamed Bichari

29 October 2011 Round 7	USM Alger	2–0	MC Oran	Algiers
18:00	Meftah 9'; Daham 41'	Report		Stadium: Stade Omar Hammadi; Referee: Saïd Aouina

4 November 2011 Round 8	MC Oran	1–2	JS Kabylie	Oran
15:00	Korbiaa 66'	Report	Boulemdaïs 16'; Hemani 27'	Stadium: Ahmed Zabana Stadium; Referee: Boubekeur Zouaoui

19 November 2011 Round 9	MC Saïda	2–0	MC Oran	Saida
18:00	Nehari 67'; Saâdi 90'	Report		Stadium: April 13, 1958 Stadium; Referee: Mohamed Sahraoui

22 November 2011 Round 10	MC Oran	2–4	ES Sétif	Oran
15:00	El Bahari 77', 83'	Report	Gourmi 19' (pen.); Benmoussa 45+3' (pen.); Djabou 60'; Nadji 75'	Stadium: Ahmed Zabana Stadium; Referee: Farouk Mial

26 November 2011 Round 11	NA Hussein Dey	0–0	MC Oran	Hussein Dey
15:00		Report		Stadium: Zioui Brothers Stadium; Referee: Redouane Necib

3 December 2011 Round 12	MC Oran	1–0	JSM Béjaïa	Oran
15:00	El Bahari 44'	Report		Stadium: Ahmed Zabana Stadium; Referee: Rafik Achouri

10 December 2011 Round 13	ASO Chlef	2–1	MC Oran	Chlef
18:00	Messaoud 40'; Seguer 87'	Report	El Bahari 59'	Stadium: Stade Mohamed Boumezrag; Referee: Merzak Halalchi

17 December 2011 Round 14	MC Oran	0–0	MC Alger	Oran
15:00		Report		Stadium: Ahmed Zabana Stadium; Referee: Mehdi Abid Charef

24 December 2011 Round 15	CA Batna	5–1	MC Oran	Batna
15:00	Bouchouk 12'; Amrane 53', 90+2'; Messadia 57', 68'	Report	Dagoulou 25'	Stadium: Mustapha Seffouhi Stadium; Referee: Mokhtar Amalou

21 January 2012 Round 16	USM El Harrach	0–1	MC Oran	Algiers
15:00		Report	El Bahari 30'	Stadium: Stade 1er Novembre 1954; Referee: Farouk Mial

28 January 2012 Round 17	MC Oran	3–0	AS Khroub	Oran
15:00	Belaïli 50', 75'; Sandaogo 73'	Report		Stadium: Stade Ahmed Zabana; Referee: Sofiane Bousseter

28 February 2012 Round 18	MC El Eulma	3–0	MC Oran	El Eulma
15:00	Diarra 42'; Bouaïcha 59'; Tiaïba 90+3'	Report		Stadium: Stade Messaoud Zougar; Referee: Mohamed Bichari

4 February 2012 Round 19	MC Oran	1–0	CR Belouizdad	Oran
15:00	El Bahari 6'	Report		Stadium: Ahmed Zabana Stadium; Referee: Mehdi Abid Charef

18 February 2012 Round 20	WA Tlemcen	4–2	MC Oran	Tlemcen
15:00	Andriamatsinoro 10', 78', 90'; Ambané 27'	Report	Dagoulou 35'; Belaïli 58'	Stadium: Stade Akid Lotfi; Referee: Boubekeur Zouaoui

3 March 2012 Round 21	CS Constantine	3–1	MC Oran	Constantine
15:00	Bezzaz 8'; Naït Yahia 22', 48'	Report	Belaïli 63'	Stadium: Stade Mohamed Hamlaoui; Referee: Farouk Mial

17 March 2012 Round 22	MC Oran	1–1	USM Alger	Oran
15:00	Bourzama 15'	Report	32' Daham	Stadium: Stade Ahmed Zabana; Attendance: 0 (close doors); Referee: Rafik Achouri

24 March 2012 Round 23	JS Kabylie	2–2	MC Oran	Tizi Ouzou
15:00	Boulemdaïs 20'; Belkalem 54'	Report	Bousehaba 82'; Aouedj 90+1'	Stadium: Stade du 1er Novembre 1954; Referee: Sofiane Bousseter

7 April 2012 Round 24	MC Oran	4–0	MC Saïda	Oran
15:30	El Bahari 18'; Aouedj 25'; Boussehaba 50' (pen.); Belaïli 82'	Report		Stadium: Stade Ahmed Zabana; Referee: Farouk Houasnia

14 April 2012 Round 25	ES Sétif	1–1	MC Oran	Sétif
18:45	Benchadi 10'	Report	Dagoulou 62'	Stadium: Stade 8 Mai 1945; Referee: Mokhtar Amalou

28 April 2012 Round 26	MC Oran	1–0	NA Hussein Dey	Oran
15:00	Sandaogo 85'	Report		Stadium: Stade Ahmed Zabana; Referee: Rafik Achouri

5 May 2012 Round 27	JSM Béjaïa	1–3	MC Oran	Béjaïa
15:00	Ouali 86'	Report	Belaïli 45+2'; Dagoulou 69'; Feddal 82'	Stadium: Stade de l'Unité Maghrébine; Referee: Mehdi Abid Charef

8 May 2012 Round 28	MC Oran	3–1	ASO Chlef	Oran
15:00	Cherif 3'; Belaïli 6' (pen.); Feddal 55'	Report	Haddouche 47'	Stadium: Stade Ahmed Zabana; Referee: Farouk Mial

15 May 2012 Round 29	MC Alger	1–1	MC Oran	Algiers
18:00	Amroune 48'	Report	Bousehaba 38' (pen.)	Stadium: Stade 5 Juillet 1962; Referee: Redouane Necib

19 May 2012 Round 30	MC Oran	1–5	CA Batna	Oran
15:00	Sandaogo 22'	Report	Merazka 12'; Messadia 12', 76', 78'; Saidi 85'	Stadium: Stade Ahmed Zabana; Referee: Sofiane Bousseter

== Algerian Cup ==
30 December 2011 Round of 64	MC Oran	1–2	ES Sétif	Oran
14:30	Dagoulou 33'	Report	Delhoum 41'; Djabou 65'	Stadium: Ahmed Zabana Stadium; Referee: Bichari, Salaouadji, Bourouba

== Squad information ==
=== Playing statistics ===
No.	Pos	Nat	Player	Total		Ligue 1		Algerian Cup	
No.	Pos	Nat	Player	Apps	Goals	Apps	Goals	Apps	Goals
Goalkeepers
16	GK	(Algeria) ALG	Ahmed Fellah	22	0	21	0	1	0
26	GK	(Algeria) ALG	Mohamed Reda Ouamane	6	0	6	0	0	0
1	GK	(Algeria) ALG	Lahouari El Ghoul	5	0	5	0	0	0
	GK	(Algeria) ALG	Mohamed Guitarni	2	0	2	0	0	0
Defenders
2	DF	(Algeria) ALG	Omar Slimi	5	0	4	0	1	0
31	DF	(Algeria) ALG	Mohamed Amine Zidane	28	0	27	0	1	0
4	DF	(Algeria) ALG	Abderaouf Zemmouchi	6	0	6	0	0	0
17	DF	(Algeria) ALG	Farid Bellabès	12	0	12	0	0	0
	DF	(Algeria) ALG	Nassim Boukemacha	12	0	12	0	0	0
11	DF	(Algeria) ALG	Sid Ahmed Fayçal Briki	8	0	8	0	0	0
29	DF	(Algeria) ALG	Kada Kechamli	5	0	5	0	0	0
3	DF	(Algeria) ALG	Sofiane Bengoureïne	7	0	7	0	0	0
20	DF	(Algeria) ALG	Hachemi Boussaada	12	0	12	0	0	0
15	DF	(Algeria) ALG	Mohamed Zine El Abidine Sebbah	18	0	17	0	1	0
22	DF	(Algeria) ALG	Chafik Bourzama	12	1	12	1	0	0
	DF	(Algeria) ALG	Mohamed Amine Abed Abassi	2	0	2	0	0	0
	DF	(Algeria) ALG	Yacine Kechout	10	0	10	0	0	0
Midfielders
8	MF	(Algeria) ALG	Abdelkader Harizi	24	0	23	0	1	0
24	MF	(Algeria) ALG	Mohamed Tahar	15	0	15	0	0	0
	MF	(Algeria) ALG	Abdennour Cherif El Ouazzani	1	0	1	0	0	0
6	MF	(Algeria) ALG	Abdelmadjid Benatia	21	0	20	0	1	0
25	MF	(Algeria) ALG	Mohamed Bentiba	11	1	10	1	1	0
12	MF	(Algeria) ALG	Sofiane Bouterbiat	19	0	19	0	0	0
14	MF	(Algeria) ALG	Touhami Tiah	3	0	2	0	1	0
19	MF	(Central African Republic) CAF	Eudes Dagoulou	20	5	19	4	1	1
36	MF	(Algeria) ALG	Ilyes Kadri	6	0	6	0	0	0
Forwards
7	FW	(Algeria) ALG	Ibrahim Boussehaba	13	3	13	3	0	0
23	FW	(Algeria) ALG	Nasereddine El Bahari	21	8	20	8	1	0
41	FW	(Algeria) ALG	Ilyes Kouriba	7	1	7	1	0	0
34	FW	(Algeria) ALG	Hicham Chérif	24	1	23	1	1	0
9	FW	(Algeria) ALG	Sid Ahmed Aouedj	18	3	17	3	1	0
17	FW	(Algeria) ALG	Khalid Leghzal	6	1	6	1	0	0
10	FW	(Algeria) ALG	Youcef Belaïli	25	8	24	8	1	0
35	FW	(Algeria) ALG	Mohamed Feddal	15	4	14	4	1	0
29	FW	(Burkina Faso) BFA	Saidou Sandaogo	8	3	8	3	0	0
Players transferred out during the season

Last updated: 25 November 2017
Source: fr.soccerway.com

== Transfers ==
=== In ===
Date	Pos	Player	From club	Transfer fee	Source
1 August 2011	DF	(Algeria) Omar Slimi	CR Belouizdad	Free transfer	
1 July 2011	DF	(Algeria) Abderaouf Zemmouchi	USM Blida	Free transfer	
1 July 2011	DF	(Algeria) Chafik Bourzama	CRB Aïn Turck	Free transfer	
1 July 2011	MF	(Algeria) Abdennour Cherif El Ouazzani	JS Kabylie	Free transfer	
1 July 2011	FW	(Algeria) Khalid Leghzal	AS Khroub	Free transfer	
1 July 2011	MF	(Algeria) Sofiane Bouterbiat	USM Annaba	Free transfer	
1 July 2011	FW	(Central African Republic) Eudes Dagoulou	(Gabon) AS Pélican	Free transfer	
16 July 2011	MF	(Algeria) Abdelkader Harizi	USM Blida	Free transfer	
1 January 2012	DF	(Algeria) Farid Bellabès	USM Alger	Free transfer	

=== Out ===
Date	Pos	Player	To club	Transfer fee	Source
1 July 2011	MF	(Algeria) Seddik Berradja	MC Alger	Free transfer	
15 July 2011	DF	(Algeria) Farid Bellabès	MC Oran	Free transfer	
1 January 2012	DF	(Algeria) Sofiane Bengoureïne	ES Sétif	Undisclosed	
