= Mehdi Messaoudi =

French-Moroccan footballer (born 1989)

Personal information
- Date of birth: 8 March 1989 (age 37)
- Place of birth: Nice, France
- Height: 1.85 m (6 ft 1 in)
- Position: Defender

Youth career
- 2004–2007: Saint-Étienne

Senior career*
Years	Team	Apps	(Gls)
2007–2009	Saint-Étienne B	17	(0)
2008–2009	Saint-Étienne	1	(0)
2009–2011	Gap	57	(0)
2011–2013	Grenoble	50	(1)
2013–2014	Aurillac Arpajon	17	(1)
2014–2015	Martigues	21	(0)
2015–2016	Le Pontet	20	(0)
2016–2017	Nice B	10	(0)
2017–2018	Saint-Jean Beaulieu	15	(0)
2018	Athlético Marseille	3	(0)
2019–2020	Moulins		
2020–2021	Courthézon		
2021	Marseille Endoume		
- * Club domestic league appearances and goals

Mehdi Messaoudi (Arabic: مَدهي مَساودي; born 8 March 1989) is a French-Moroccan former professional footballer who played as a defender. His first name is often misspelled as Medhi.

== Career ==
Messaoudi was born in Nice, France. He joined AS Saint-Étienne in 2004. After spending nearly four years in their youth system, he began training with the senior squad for the 2008–09 season. However, he was officially promoted to the senior squad, along with Yoann Andreu and Lounis Lanseur, following the firing of Laurent Roussey and the hiring of new manager Alain Perrin who was looking to reshuffle Saint-Étienne's defense and fill the squad, which was decimated with injuries. He was assigned the number 31 shirt.

Messaoudi made his professional debut on 20 December 2008 coming on as a substitute playing 35 minutes in a 2–0 victory over Auxerre.

He moved to Championnat National 2 club Athlético Marseille in 2018. After 1,5 years at AS Moulins, Messaoudi joined Régional 1 club SC Courthézon. In the summer 2021, he moved to US Marseille Endoume.
