= Wander Luiz =

Wander Luiz may refer to:

- Wander Luiz (footballer, born 1987), full name Wander Luiz Bitencourt Junior, Brazilian football attacking midfielder
- Wander Luiz (footballer, born 1992), full name Wander Luiz Queiroz Dias, Brazilian football forward
