= Ezechiel N'Douassel =

Chadian footballer (born 1988)

Ezechiel N'Douassel إيزيكييل ندواسيل
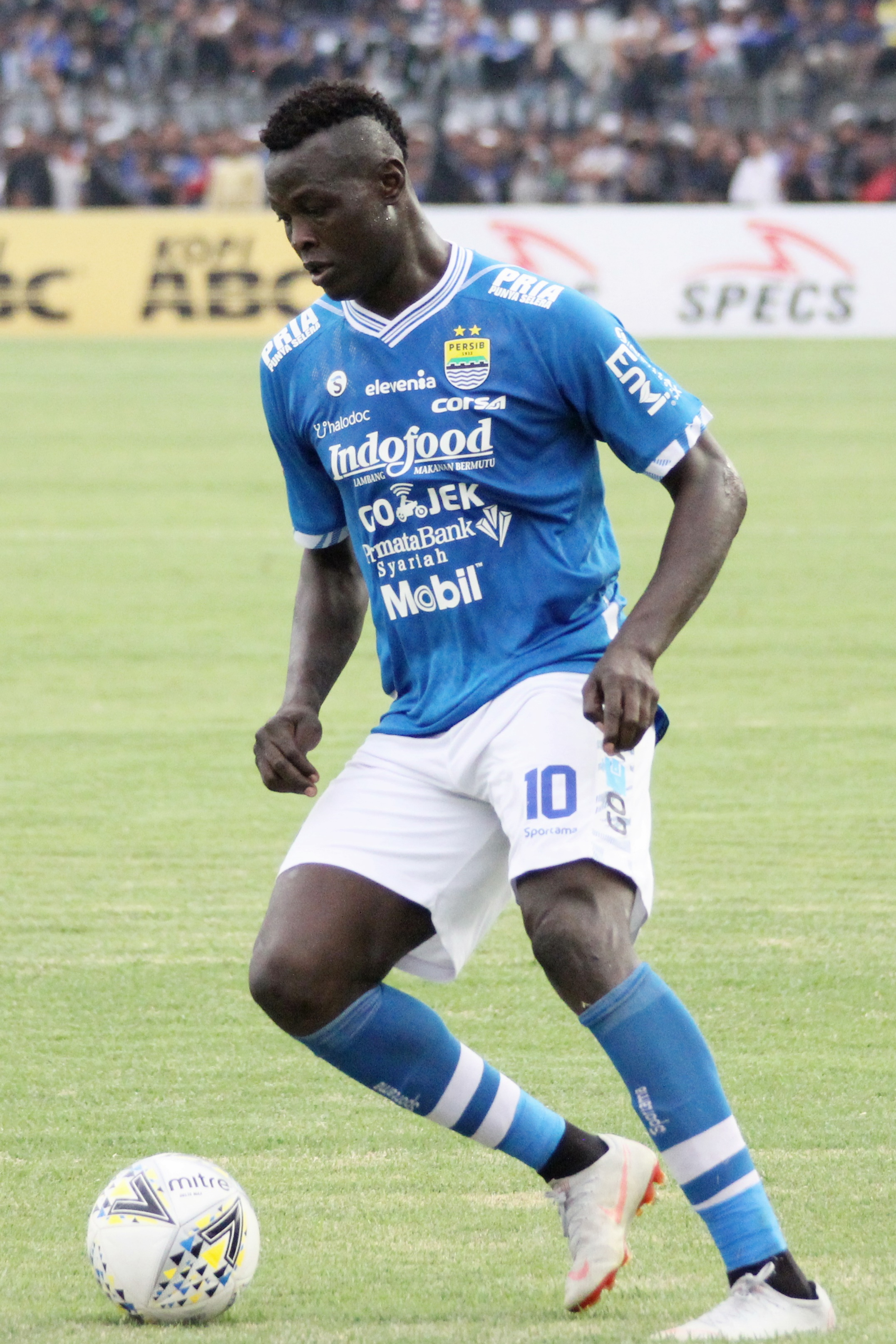
- Ezechiel playing for Persib Bandung in 2018

Personal information
- Full name: Ezechiel Aliadjim N'Douassel
- Date of birth: 22 April 1988 (age 38)
- Place of birth: N'Djamena, Chad
- Height: 1.90 m (6 ft 3 in)
- Position: Striker

Team information
- Current team: PSGC Ciamis
- Number: 10

Youth career
- Tourbillon

Senior career*
Years	Team	Apps	(Gls)
2005–2007	Tourbillon	54	(32)
2007–2008	Mouloudia d'Oran	4	(2)
2008–2010	USM Blida	29	(18)
2011–2012	Club Africain	28	(11)
2012–2014	Akhmat Grozny	15	(4)
2013–2014	→ Konyaspor (loan)	6	(1)
2014	→ Club Africain (loan)	11	(3)
2014–2015	NA Hussein Dey	7	(1)
2015–2016	CS Sfaxien	26	(9)
2016–2017	Ironi Kiryat Shmona	11	(3)
2017	Hapoel Tel Aviv	5	(1)
2017–2019	Persib Bandung	62	(36)
2020–2022	Bhayangkara	25	(12)
2023–2024	Bekasi City	17	(10)
2024	Persela Lamongan	18	(14)
2025–2026	Bekasi City	23	(14)
2026–	PSGC Ciamis	2	(3)

International career^{‡}
2005–	Chad	51	(14)
- * Club domestic league appearances and goals as of 19 September 2026 ‡ National team caps and goals as of 10 June 2025

Ezechiel Aliadjim N'Douassel (Arabic: إيزيكييل عليادجيم ندواسيل; born 22 April 1988), nicknamed King Eze, is a Chadian professional footballer who plays a striker for Championship club PSGC Ciamis and the Chad national team.

== Club career ==
=== Early career ===
N'Douassel began his career in 2006 at local side Tourbillon before moving to Algeria in 2007 to play for MC Oran and he joined USM Blida.

=== USM Blida ===
In his debut for USM Blida, Ndouassel scored a brace against MC El Eulma, with goals in the 86th and 90th minute to give his team a 2–1 win. He would end the season with five goals in fifteen appearances. During his time at USM Blida, N'Douassel was linked with a number of European clubs including Olympique de Marseille, Arsenal, Monaco and Mallorca. On July 20, 2009, it was announced that Ndouassel joined Belgian club FCV Dender on a free transfer and signed a 3-year contract worth €200,000 after impressing on trial in friendlies against Roeselare and Hamme. However, the move was not finalized and Ndouassel was forced to return to USM Blida shortly after because he was still under contract with the club.

=== Club Africain ===
On January 9, 2011, Ndouassel signed a 4-year contract with Tunisian side Club Africain. For the 2011 CAF Confederation Cup his team made it second place losing to Maghreb de Fès by penalties. During the 2012 CAF Confederation Cup he scored a Hattrick for Africain making them reach the fourth round before they got eliminated in the playoffs. In July 2014, Ndouassel was reported to have moved to Paris FC on loan, with an option to buy. However this move fell through due to financial constraints on the French club, and with Club African unwilling to include him in their squad, left Ndouassel looking for a new club.

=== Israel ===
On 4 September 2016 he signed a 3-year contract with Ironi Kiryat Shmona. In January 2017 he left the club and joined Hapoel Tel Aviv until the end of the 2016–17 Israeli Premier League season. After playing five matches, he was released in March 2017, following behaviour issues.

=== Persib Bandung ===
On 7 August 2017, he signed a half year contract with Persib Bandung and retained for the following season. He made his league debut in a 0–0 against Arema on 12 August 2017 as a substitute for Tantan in the 45th minute. On 20 August 2017, N'Douassel scored his first league goal for Persib against Gresik United as his team won 6–0.

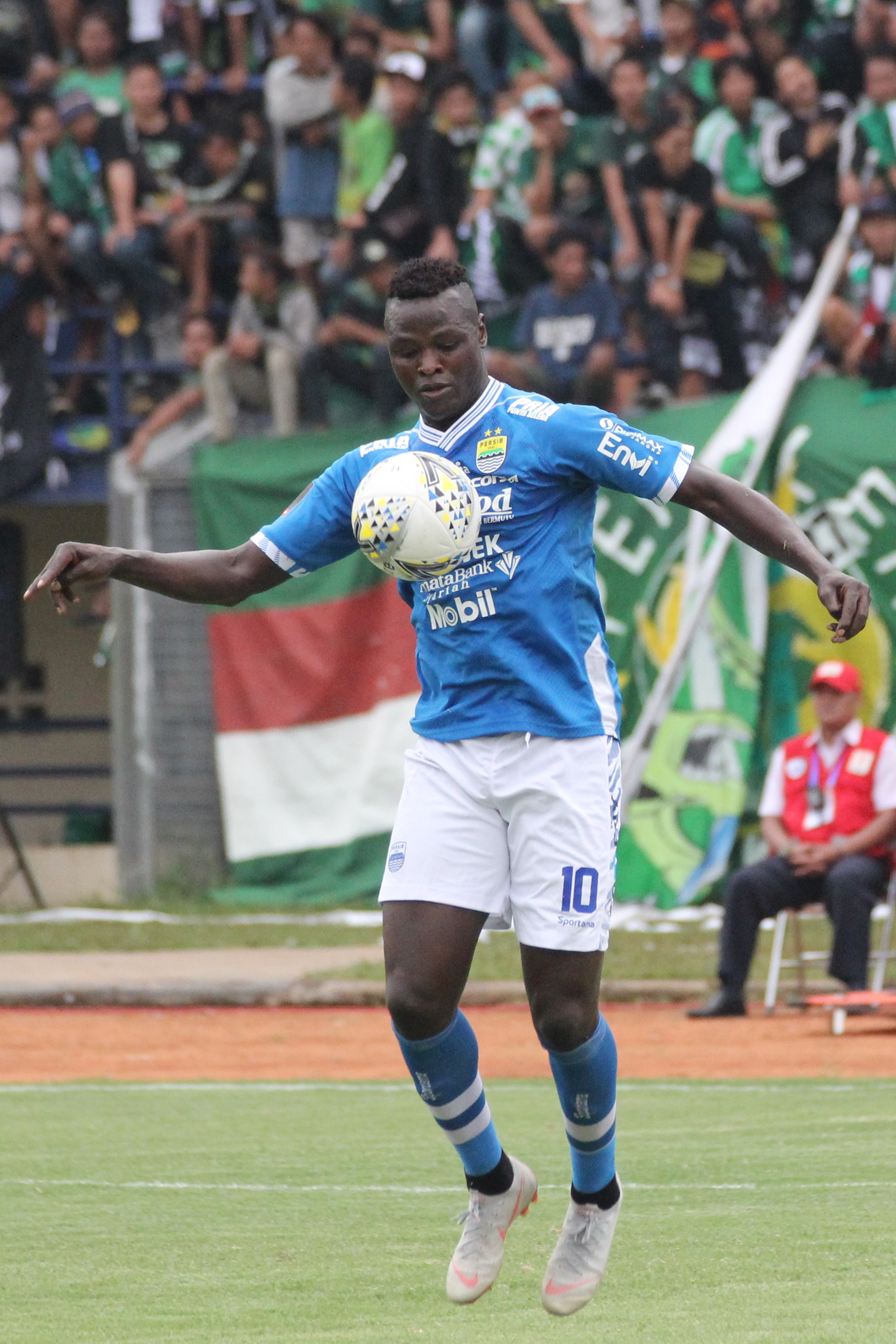
N'Douassel in 2018

He was also the top scorer for Persib in 2018 season with 17 goals, and retained by the club until 2020. He scored quattrick in a match against PSM Makassar on 22 December 2019.

=== Bhayangkara ===
In January 2020, N'Douassel completed a move to Bhayangkara on a 2-year deal.

==== 2020 season ====
N'Douassel made his debut for Bhayangkara, coming on as a substitute for Herman Dzumafo, in a pre-season cup game against Cambodian Premier League club Visakha as his team won 1–0. N'Douassel scored his first goal for Bhayangkara in the same pre-season cup against Malaysia Super League club Petaling Jaya City, scoring a goal in the 55th-minute, which saw Bhayangkara crowned as the champion. On 29 February 2020, N'Douassel made his first league debut for Bhayangkara against Persiraja Banda Aceh as his team drew 0–0. On 31 March 2020 N'Douassel scored his first league goal for Bhayangkara against Persija Jakarta as his team drew 2–2.

==== 2021 season ====
On 29 August 2021, N'Douassel scored a brace in Bhayangkara's first league match in 2021–22 Liga 1, earning them a 2–1 win over Persiraja Banda Aceh. N'Douassel scored two goals in a 3–2 win against Barito Putera, extending Bhayangkara unbeaten streak to six matches. On the following matchday, he started against his former club Persib Bandung, which ended his team's unbeaten run with a score of 2–0.

== International career ==
N'Douassel debuted for the Chad national team in 2005. He is the former captain and the national team's most capped player and top scorer in history.

== Career statistics ==
=== Club ===
As of match played 19 September 2026

Club	Season	League			National cup		Continental		Other		Total	
Club	Season	Division	Apps	Goals	Apps	Goals	Apps	Goals	Apps	Goals	Apps	Goals
Blida	2008–09	Ligue 1	16	5	0	0	—		—		16	5
Blida	2009–10	Ligue 1	13	7	1	0	—		—		14	7
Blida	Total		29	12	1	0	—		—		30	12
Club Africain	2010–11	Ligue I Pro	7	2	0	0	4 (Note: Appearances in CAF Champions League)	1	0	0	11	3
Club Africain	2011–12	Ligue 1 Pro	21	9	0	0	—		—		21	9
Club Africain	2013–14	Ligue 1 Pro	11	3	2	0	—		—		13	3
Club Africain	Total		39	14	2	0	4	1	0	0	45	15
Akhmat Grozny (loan)	2012–13	Russian Premier League	15	4	2	1	—		—		17	5
Konyaspor (loan)	2013–14	Süper Lig	6	0	1	2	—		—		7	2
NA Hussein Dey	2014–15	Ligue 1	7	1	2	2	—		—		9	3
CS Sfaxien	2015–16	Ligue 1 Pro	26	9	0	0	—		—		26	9
Ironi Kiryat	2016–17	Israeli Premier League	11	3	0	0	—		—		11	3
Hapoel Tel Aviv	2016–17	Israeli Premier League	5	1	0	0	—		—		5	1
Persib Bandung	2017	Liga 1	14	4	0	0	—		—		14	4
Persib Bandung	2018	Liga 1	22	17	0	0	—		0	0	22	17
Persib Bandung	2019	Liga 1	26	15	0	0	—		1 (Note: Appearance(s) in Piala Presiden)	0	27	15
Persib Bandung	2020	Liga 1	0	0	3	3	—		3	1	6	4
Persib Bandung	Total		62	36	3	3	—		4	0	69	40
Bhayangkara	2020	Liga 1	3	1	0	0	—		1 (Note: Appearances in 2021 Menpora Cup)	0	3	1
Bhayangkara	2021–22	Liga 1	22	11	0	0	—		—		22	11
Bhayangkara	Total		25	12	0	0	—		1	0	26	12
Bekasi City	2023–24	Liga 2	17	10	0	0	—		4 (Note: Appearances in Promotion play-offs)	0	21	10
Persela Lamongan	2024–25	Liga 2	18	14	0	0	—		0	0	18	14
Bekasi City	2025–26	Championship	23	14	0	0	—		0	0	23	14
PSGC Ciamis	2026–27	Championship	2	3	0	0	—		0	0	2	3
Career statistics			285	136	11	8	4	1	9	1	309	146

=== International ===
Scores and results list Chad's goal tally first.

FIFA official matches
No.	Date	Venue	Opponent	Score	Result	Competition
1.	6 March 2007	Stade Omnisports Idriss Mahamat Ouya, N'Djamena, Chad	Central African Republic	1–2	3–2	2007 CEMAC Cup
2.	11 August 2010	Stade Omnisports Idriss Mahamat Ouya, N'Djamena, Chad	Tunisia	1–2	1–3	2012 Africa Cup of Nations qualification
3.	9 October 2010	Kamuzu Stadium, Blantyre, Malawi	Malawi	1–2	2–6	2012 Africa Cup of Nations qualification
4.	31 May 2014	Stade Omnisports Idriss Mahamat Ouya, N'Djamena, Chad	Malawi	3–0	1–0	2015 Africa Cup of Nations qualification
5.	31 May 2014	Stade Omnisports Idriss Mahamat Ouya, N'Djamena, Chad	Malawi	3–0	3–0	2015 Africa Cup of Nations qualification
6.	14 November 2015	Stade Omnisports Idriss Mahamat Ouya, N'Djamena, Chad	Egypt	1–0	1–0	2018 FIFA World Cup qualification
7.	19 September 2019	Stade Omnisports Idriss Mahamat Ouya, N'Djamena, Chad	Sudan	1–3	1–3	2022 FIFA World Cup qualification
8.	13 October 2019	Stade Omnisports Idriss Mahamat Ouya, N'Djamena, Chad	Liberia	1–0	1–0 (5–4 p)	2021 Africa Cup of Nations qualification
9.	13 November 2019	Sam Nujoma Stadium, Windhoek, Namibia	Namibia	1–1	1–2	2021 Africa Cup of Nations qualification

== Honours ==
=== Individual ===
- Liga 2 Player of half season : 2024-25
- Liga 2 Player of the month : November 2024-25
