= Saiful (footballer) =

Indonesian footballer

Personal information
- Date of birth: 9 September 2002 (age 24)
- Place of birth: Karawang, Indonesia
- Height: 1.65 m (5 ft 5 in)
- Position: Attacking midfielder

Youth career
- 2017–2018: Persib Bandung

Senior career*
Years	Team	Apps	(Gls)
2020–2021	Persib Bandung	0	(0)
2021	→ Bandung United (loan)	14	(3)
2022–2023	Persebaya Surabaya	4	(0)
2023	→ Perserang Serang (loan)	3	(0)
- * Club domestic league appearances and goals as of 23 October 2023

Saiful (born 9 September 2002) is an Indonesian professional footballer who plays as an attacking midfielder.

== Club career ==
=== Bandung United (loan) ===
He was signed for Bandung United to play in the Liga 2 in the 2021 season, on loan from Persib Bandung. He made 14 league appearances and scored 3 goals for Bandung United.

=== Persebaya Surabaya ===
He was signed for Persebaya Surabaya and played in Liga 1 in 2022–2023 season. Saiful made his league debut on 7 August 2022 in a match against Bhayangkara at the Wibawa Mukti Stadium, Cikarang.

== Career statistics ==
=== Club ===
As of 23 October 2023

Club	Season	League			Cup		Continental		Other		Total	
Club	Season	Division	Apps	Goals	Apps	Goals	Apps	Goals	Apps	Goals	Apps	Goals
Persib Bandung	2020	Liga 1	0	0	0	0	–		0	0	0	0
Bandung United (loan)	2021–22	Liga 3	14	3	0	0	–		0	0	14	3
Persebaya Surabaya	2022–23	Liga 1	4	0	0	0	–		0	0	4	0
Persebaya Surabaya	2023–24	Liga 1	0	0	0	0	–		0	0	0	0
Perserang Serang (loan)	2023–24	Liga 2	3	0	0	0	–		0	0	3	0
Career total			21	3	0	0	0	0	0	0	21	3
