= Wildan Ramdhani =

Indonesian footballer (born 1998)

Personal information
- Full name: Mochammad Wildan Ramdhani Nugraha
- Date of birth: 24 December 1998 (age 27)
- Place of birth: Bandung, Indonesia
- Height: 1.70 m (5 ft 7 in)
- Position: Forward

Team information
- Current team: Barito Putera
- Number: 20

Youth career
- 2015–2018: Persib Bandung

Senior career*
Years	Team	Apps	(Gls)
2018–2022	Persib Bandung	4	(0)
2019–2021	→ Bandung United (loan)	23	(6)
2022–2023	Persita Tangerang	28	(7)
2023–2024	Persebaya Surabaya	20	(2)
2024–2025	PSIS Semarang	18	(1)
2025–	Barito Putera	13	(1)
- * Club domestic league appearances and goals as of 4 October 2026

Mochammad Wildan Ramdhani Nugraha (born 24 December 1998) is an Indonesian professional footballer who plays as a forward for Liga 2 club Barito Putera.

== Club career ==
=== Persib Bandung ===
Wildan started his career as a footballer by joined Persib Academy. In 2018, Wildan was promoted to join the senior team with his academy teammate, Beckham Putra. However, his fate was different from his colleagues, when Beckham started to get the main place in Persib, Wildan had difficulty getting minutes to play in the team. And Finally, he made his professional debut in the Liga 1 on 10 August 2018, against Mitra Kukar where he played as a substitute. After being loaned to Bandung United in 2019, that also failed to improve his performance. As a result, Wildan chose to leave in 2022.

==== Bandung United (loan) ====
He was signed for Bandung United to play in the Liga 2 in the 2019 season, on loan from Persib Bandung. He made 23 league appearances and scored 6 goals for Bandung United.

=== Persita Tangerang ===
Wildan was signed for Persita Tangerang to play in Liga 1 in the 2022–23 season. He made his league debut on 25 July 2022 in a match against Persik Kediri and also scored his first league goal for the team, he scored in the 56th minute at the Indomilk Arena, Tangerang. He scored his second league goal for the club on 19 August, opening the scoring in a 5–3 win against Persikabo 1973. On 28 August, he scored a brace for Persita in a 2–3 win against Bhayangkara at Wibawa Mukti Stadium. On 29 September, Wildan scored equalizer in a 1–2 away win over PSS Sleman, he was also selected as man of the match in that match. On 13 December, Wildan was involved in Persita's big 4–1 win over RANS Nusantara, scoring in the 32nd minute.

On 15 February 2023, Wildan scored in 74th minute and saved Persita Tangerang from losing to Madura United , score draw 1–1.

=== Persebaya Surabaya ===
Wildan was signed for Persebaya Surabaya to play in Liga 1 in the 2023–24 season. He made his debut on 1 July 2023 in a match against Persis Solo at the Manahan Stadium, Surakarta.

=== PSIS Semarang ===
On 2 July 2024, PSIS Semarang added strength on the front lines by recruiting local striker, Wildan Ramdhani. Previous player aged 25 that year strengthened Persebaya Surabaya in the 2023–24 Liga 1. Wildan was brought in so that the depth of the squad on the PSIS front lines was getting better. Wildan made his debut on 11 August 2024 in a match against Persita Tangerang at the Moch. Soebroto Stadium, Magelang. On 9 June 2025, Wildan officially left PSIS Semarang.
