= Malik Rouag =

French footballer (born 1983)

Personal information
- Date of birth: 12 January 1983 (age 42)
- Place of birth: France
- Position(s): Midfielder, Forward

Senior career*
Years	Team	Apps	(Gls)
-2004	Paris Saint-Germain F.C.	0	(0)
2004-2005	FC Gueugnon	0	(0)
2005-2006	US Quevilly		
2006-2007	US Albi		
2007-2008	Pau FC	32	(9)
2008=2009	AS Beauvais Oise	32	(8)
2009/2010	ES Sétif		
2009/10-2010/11	US Albi	29	(13)
2010/2011	USM Blida	11	(1)
2011/2012	FC Mantois 78	19	(14)
2012-2013	Paris Saint-Germain F.C. II	31	(12)
2013-2014	Grenoble Foot 38	18	(3)
2014-2017	AS Poissy	69	(33)
2017-2018	FC Mantois 78	22	(9)
2018-	AS Poissy	33	(12)
- * Club domestic league appearances and goals

Malik Rouag (born 12 January 1983 in France) is a French footballer.
