= Dhika Bayangkara =

Indonesian professional footballer

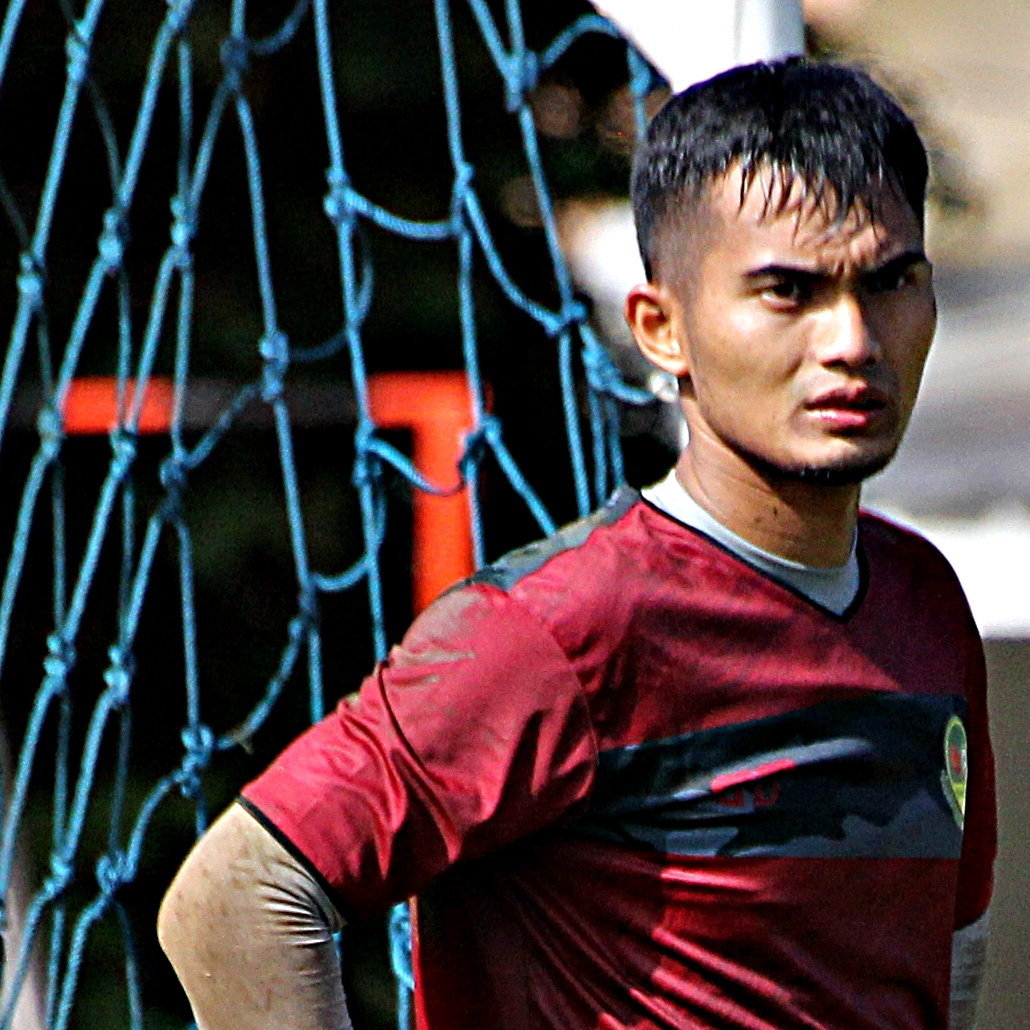
- Bayangkara with TIRA-Persikabo in 2019

Personal information
- Full name: Dhika Bayangkara
- Date of birth: 29 April 1992 (age 34)
- Place of birth: Kuningan, Indonesia
- Height: 1.80 m (5 ft 11 in)
- Position: Goalkeeper

Team information
- Current team: Persekabpas Pasuruan

Youth career
- 2009–2010: Persija Jakarta

Senior career*
Years	Team	Apps	(Gls)
2012–2013	Persiba Balikpapan	3	(0)
2013–2014	Persekap Pasuruan	16	(0)
2014–2015	Persikad Depok	14	(0)
2015–2017	PS TNI	29	(0)
2017–2018	PSMS Medan	13	(0)
2019	TIRA-Persikabo	0	(0)
2019	PSS Sleman	0	(0)
2019–2022	Persib Bandung	1	(0)
2021–2022	→ Persita Tangerang (loan)	18	(0)
2022–2023	Persita Tangerang	17	(0)
2023–2024	Barito Putera	1	(0)
2024–2025	FC Bekasi City	6	(0)
2026–	Persekabpas Pasuruan	0	(0)
- * Club domestic league appearances and goals as of 4 January 2025

Dhika Bayangkara (born 29 April 1992) is an Indonesian professional footballer who plays as a goalkeeper for Liga Nusantara club Persekabpas Pasuruan.

== Club career ==
=== PS TNI ===
Dhika made his debut when PS TNI against Gresik United in the fourth week 2016 Indonesia Soccer Championship. A full-time Dhika also play PS TNI draw against PSM Makassar in the fifth week.

=== Barito Putera ===
Ahead of the 2023–24 season, Dhika signed a year contract with Barito Putera.
