= Beni Oktovianto =

Indonesian footballer

Personal information
- Full name: Beni Oktovianto
- Date of birth: 23 October 1998 (age 28)
- Place of birth: Pontianak, Indonesia
- Height: 1.73 m (5 ft 8 in)
- Positions: Forward; winger

Team information
- Current team: Persikota Tangerang
- Number: 62

Youth career
- 2009–2014: SSB Pelangi Mandau
- 2014–2016: Bontang

Senior career*
Years	Team	Apps	(Gls)
2017	Persik Kediri	12	(0)
2018	Persiba Balikpapan	22	(9)
2018	Kalteng Putra	6	(0)
2019	Persiba Balikpapan	18	(2)
2020	Persib Bandung	0	(0)
2021–2022	Barito Putera	31	(3)
2022	PSMS Medan	3	(0)
2023	Persik Kediri	3	(0)
2023–2024	Kalteng Putra	15	(1)
2024	Sriwijaya	9	(1)
2025–2026	Persiba Balikpapan	20	(1)
2026–	Persikota Tangerang	1	(1)
- * Club domestic league appearances and goals as of 22:00, 13 November 2026 (UTC)

Beni Oktovianto (born 23 October 1998) is an Indonesian professional footballer who plays as a forward and winger for Liga Nusantara club Persikota Tangerang.

== Club career ==
=== Persik Kediri ===
He was signed for Persik Kediri to play in Liga 2 in the 2017 season.

=== Persiba Balikpapan ===
On 12 March 2018, Beni signed a one-year contract with Liga 2 club Persiba Balikpapan. He made 22 league appearances and scored 9 goals for Persiba in the 2018 Liga 2 (Indonesia)

=== Kalteng Putra ===
In 2018, Beni signed a contract with Liga 2 club Kalteng Putra on a free transfer.

=== Return to Persiba Balikpapan ===
On 11 March 2019, it was confirmed that Beni would re-join Persiba Balikpapan, signing a year contract. He made 18 league appearances and scored 2 goals for Persiba Balikpapan in the 2019 Liga 1 (Indonesia).

=== Persib Bandung ===
He was signed for Persib Bandung to play in Liga 1 in the 2020 season. This season was suspended on 27 March 2020 due to the COVID-19 pandemic. The season was abandoned and was declared void on 20 January 2021.

=== Barito Putera ===
He was signed for Barito Putera to play in Liga 1 in the 2021 season. Beni made his debut on 4 September 2021 in a match against Persib Bandung. On 15 October 2021, Beni scored his first goal for Barito Putera against PSS Sleman in the 18th minute at the Manahan Stadium, Surakarta.

=== PSMS Medan ===
Beni was signed for PSMS Medan to play in Liga 2 in the 2022–23 season. He made his league debut on 30 August 2022 in a match against PSKC Cimahi at the Si Jalak Harupat Stadium, Soreang.

== Career statistics ==
=== Club ===
As of match played 13 November 2026

Club	Season	League			Cup		Continental		Other		Total	
Club	Season	Division	Apps	Goals	Apps	Goals	Apps	Goals	Apps	Goals	Apps	Goals
Persik Kediri	2017	Liga 2	12	0	0	0	–		0	0	12	0
Persiba Balikpapan	2018	Liga 2	22	9	0	0	–		0	0	22	9
Kalteng Putra	2018	Liga 2	6	0	0	0	–		0	0	6	0
Persiba Balikpapan	2019	Liga 2	18	2	0	0	–		0	0	18	2
Persib Bandung	2020	Liga 1	0	0	0	0	–		0	0	0	0
Barito Putera	2021	Liga 1	31	3	0	0	–		4 (Note: Appearances in Menpora Cup)	1	35	4
Barito Putera	2022–23	Liga 1	0	0	0	0	–		0	0	0	0
PSMS Medan	2022–23	Liga 2	3	0	0	0	–		0	0	3	0
Persik Kediri	2022–23	Liga 1	3	0	0	0	–		0	0	3	0
Kalteng Putra	2023–24	Liga 2	15	1	0	0	–		0	0	15	1
Sriwijaya	2024–25	Liga 2	9	1	0	0	–		0	0	9	1
Persiba Balikpapan	2025–26	Championship	20	1	0	0	–		0	0	20	1
Persikota Tangerang	2026–27	Liga Nusantara	1	1	0	0	–		0	0	1	1
Career total			140	18	0	0	0	0	4	1	144	19
