= Nacer Bennemra =

Algerian footballer (born 1989)

Personal information
- Full name: Nacer Bennemra
- Date of birth: 12 June 1989 (age 37)
- Place of birth: Zéralda, Algeria
- Height: 1.74 m (5 ft 9 in)
- Position: Midfielder

Youth career
- 2002–2008: Clermont Foot

Senior career*
Years	Team	Apps	(Gls)
2008–2010	FC Gueugnon	25	(1)
2011	USM Blida	6	(0)

International career
2010–	Algeria U23		
- * Club domestic league appearances and goals as of 00:00, 17 August 2011 (UTC)

Nacer Bennemra (born 12 June 1989) is an Algerian footballer. He is currently unattached.

== Personal ==
Bennemra was born on 12 June 1989 in Zéralda. In 1996 he moved with his family to France.

== Club career ==
Bennemra began playing at a young in age in Cournon. At age 13, he joined Clermont Foot and remained at the club for six years. However, in 2009, he left Clermont and signed with Championnat National side FC Gueugnon.

On 28 January 2011 Bennemra signed a two-year contract with Algerian club USM Blida.

== International career ==
On 14 May 2010, Bennemra was called up to the Algerian Under-23 National Team by coach Abdelhak Benchikha for a 10-day training camp in Italy. The camp included a match against a local club, which was won 4–0 by the Algerian Under-23 side with a goal from Bennemra in the second half.
