= Lounis Lanseur =

Footballer (born 1989)

Personal information
- Date of birth: 16 January 1989 (age 37)
- Place of birth: Saint-Étienne, France
- Height: 1.81 m (5 ft 11 in)
- Position: Defender

Youth career
- 1998–2010: Saint-Étienne

Senior career*
Years	Team	Apps	(Gls)
2006–2010	Saint-Étienne B		
2010–2011	Libourne		
2011	USM Blida	5	(0)
2011–2012	Thiers		
2012–2013	Andrézieux	16	(0)
2014–2015	Saint-Chamond		
2015–2016	Thiers		
2016	FC Perly-Certoux		
2016–2018	ES Vallières		(0)

International career
2009	Algeria U23		
- * Club domestic league appearances and goals

Lounis Lanseur (born 16 January 1989) is a former professional footballer who played as a defender. Born in France, he represented Algeria at international level.

== Club career ==
Born in Saint-Étienne, France, Lanseur began his career at age 9 with his hometown club of AS Saint-Étienne. He worked his way up the ranks of the club and became the captain of the reserve team in the 2009–10 season. In the summer of 2010, when he was not offered a professional contract by the club, he left to join FC Libourne-Saint-Seurin.

In January 2011, Lanseur was linked with a move to ES Sétif. However, a month later, he ended up signing with another Algerian club, USM Blida.

== International career ==
On 9 August 2009, Lanseur was called up by head coach Abdelhak Benchikha to the Algeria Under-23 national team for a week long training camp in Blida. He was called up again later that month for another training camp.
