= Omar Slimi =

Algerian footballer (born 1987)

Personal information
- Full name: Omar Slimi
- Date of birth: October 21, 1987 (age 39)
- Place of birth: Béchar, Algeria
- Position: Defender

Team information
- Current team: WA Tlemcen

Senior career*
Years	Team	Apps	(Gls)
2006–2007	USM Bel Abbès	-	(-)
2007–2011	ASO Chlef	-	(-)
2011	→ CR Belouizdad (loan)	1	(0)
2011–2012	MC Oran	4	(0)
2012–2014	NA Hussein Dey	-	(-)
2014–	WA Tlemcen	-	(-)
- * Club domestic league appearances and goals as of 22:30, May 1, 2018 (UTC)

Omar Slimi (born October 21, 1987, in Béchar) is an Algerian football player.

== Club career ==
Slimi began his career with USM Bel Abbès. In 2007, he joined ASO Chlef, where he would spend the next three and a half seasons.

=== CR Belouizdad ===
On January 27, 2011, Slimi signed an 18-month contract with CR Belouizdad. On April 25, 2011, he made his debut for the club as a starter in a league match against AS Khroub.

=== MC Oran ===
On August 14, 2011, Slimi signed a two-year contract with MC Oran, joining them on free transfer from CR Belouizdad.
