= Abdelkader Harizi =

Algerian footballer (born 1987)

Personal information
- Full name: Abdelkader Harizi
- Date of birth: July 14, 1987 (age 39)
- Place of birth: Djendel, Algeria
- Position: Midfielder

Team information
- Current team: USMM Hadjout

Youth career
- 2004–2005: CRB Djendel

Senior career*
Years	Team	Apps	(Gls)
2005–2010	CR Belouizdad	-	(-)
2010–2011	USM Blida	44	(8)
2011–2012	MC Oran	23	(0)
2012–2013	MC El Eulma	0	(0)
2013–2014	Espérance sportive de Mostaganem	-	(-)
2014–	USMM Hadjout	-	(-)
- * Club domestic league appearances and goals as of 00:00, 06 aout 2014 (UTC)

Abdelkader Harizi (born July 14, 1987) is an Algerian football player. He currently plays for MC El Eulma in the Algerian Ligue Professionnelle 1.

== Club career ==
On January 7, 2010, it was announced that Harizi had signed a six-month contract with USM Blida, after spending five seasons with CR Belouizdad. On April 14, 2010, he scored his first league goal for USM Blida in a 2–1 loss to ES Sétif.
