= Abderaouf Zemmouchi =

Algerian footballer (born 1987)

Personal information
- Full name: Abderaouf Zemmouchi
- Date of birth: February 9, 1987 (age 39)
- Place of birth: Boufarik, Algeria
- Position: Defender

Team information
- Current team: MC Oran

Senior career*
Years	Team	Apps	(Gls)
2005–2011	USM Blida	113	(3)
2011–2012	MC Oran	6	(0)
2012–2014	USM Annaba	21	(1)
2014–2015	USM Blida	20	(1)
2015–2016	CA Batna	14	(0)
2016–2017	WA Boufarik	24	(0)
2018–	CA Batna	10	(0)

International career
2005–2006	Algeria U20	-	(-)
- * Club domestic league appearances and goals

Abderaouf Zemmouchi (born February 9, 1987) is an Algerian footballer. He currently plays for MC Oran in the Algerian Ligue Professionnelle 1.

== International career ==
In March 2005, Zemmouchi was called up to the Algerian Under-20 National Team for an international tournament in Mulhouse, France. In March 2006, Zemmouchi was called up again for a training camp in Algiers. He was also a member of the Algerian Under-20 team that played against Libya in the first round of qualifiers for the 2007 African Youth Championship.
